= Football Association of Poltava Oblast =

Governing body of association football in Poltava Oblast

UAF
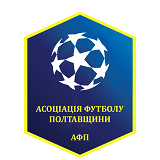
- Short name: AFP
- Founded: 14 March 1948; 78 years ago
- Headquarters: Nezalezhnosti Square, 16
- Location: Poltava
- UAF affiliation: 1991
- Chairman: Ihor Kislov
- Website: https://ffp.org.ua

Football Association of Poltava Oblast is a football governing body in the region of Poltava Oblast, Ukraine. The federation is a member of the Football Federation of Ukraine.

== History ==
First official football body in Poltava region, then part of Kharkiv Oblast was Football League organized in 1920. Four teams were part of the league: Sokil, Alphard, Maccabi and Podil. First statutes were created and accepted. In the fall of 1920 first official football tournament in Poltava region was held. In June 1924 in order to unite different football organizations of Poltava a football section was created at Provincial council of physical culture in Poltava. Its responsibilities included conducting the city championship, training of officials, supplying coaches for the teams and controlling the calendar. First Championship and Cup of Poltava Region were organized in 1938 and 1939. First Oblast of conference was organized in 1947 and idea of transforming the football section. Official date of creation of the football section was 13 and 14 March 1948. Danylo Matiushenko was elected as first chairman. In 1960 the football section was renamed football federation and it remained as part of the Poltava Oblast sports committee. On 2 February 1990 Football Federation of Poltava Oblast (FFPO) was created. It was the first Ukrainian and second Soviet self-sufficient football federation.

At the end of 2017, the Federation reorganized as Football Federation of Poltavshchyna (Ukrainian: Федерація футболу Полтавщини, ФФП, FFP) by excluding its collective members that participate in professional football, i.e. FC Vorskla Poltava, FC Hirnyk-Sport Horishni Plavni, FC Poltava, FC Kremin Kremenchuk. The new organization has replaced the former Football Federation of Poltava Oblast.

== Previous Champions ==
- 1938 PVATU (Note: Poltava Military Automobile and Tank School were awarded with a 3 year trophy) (1)
- 1939 no competition (PVATU)
- 1940 no competition (PVATU)
- 1941-44 World War II
- 1945 no competition
- 1946 FC Spartak Poltava (1)
- 1947 FC Dynamo Poltava (1)
- 1948 FC Dzerzhynets Kremenchuk (1)
- 1949 FC Lokomotyv Poltava (1)
- 1950 FC Lokomotyv Poltava (2)
- 1951 FC Spartak Poltava (2)
- 1952 FC Dzerzhynets Kremenchuk (2)
- 1953 FC Lokomotyv Poltava (3)
- 1954 FC Lokomotyv Poltava (4)
- 1955 FC Avanhard Kremenchuk (3)
- 1956(s) FC Enerhiia Poltava (1) (Note: In 1956 two competitions were held, spring (s) and fall (f).)
- 1956(f) FC Kolhospnyk Poltava (1)
- 1957 FC Lokomotyv Poltava (5)
- 1958 FC Lokomotyv Poltava (6)
- 1959 FC Kolhospnyk Khorol (1)
- 1960 FC Lokomotyv Poltava (7)
- 1961 FC Lokomotyv Poltava (8)
- 1962 FC Dnipro Kremenchuk (1)
- 1963 FC Strila Poltava (1)
- 1964 FC Zirka Poltava (1)
- 1965 FC Avanhard Kremenchuk (4)
- 1966 Suputnyk Poltava (1)
- 1967 Suputnyk Poltava (2)
- 1968 Suputnyk Poltava (3)
- 1969 Suputnyk Poltava (4)
- 1970 FC Vahonobudivnyk Kremenchuk (5)
- 1971 FC Promin Poltava (1)
- 1972 Suputnyk Poltava (5)
- 1973 FC Metalurh Kremenchuk (1)
- 1974 Suputnyk Poltava (6)
- 1975 FC Burevisnyk Poltava (1)
- 1976 FC Burevisnyk Poltava (2)
- 1977 Suputnyk Poltava (7)
- 1978 FC Metalurh Kremenchuk (2)
- 1979 FC Metalurh Kremenchuk (3)
- 1980 FC Lokomotyv Poltava (9)
- 1981 Suputnyk Poltava (8)
- 1982 FC Kooperator Poltava (3)
- 1983 FC Zirka Lubny (1)
- 1984 FC Avtomobilist Poltava (1)
- 1985 FC Motor Poltava (1)
- 1986 FC Motor Poltava (2)
- 1987 FC Avtomobilist Poltava (2)
- 1988 FC Avtomobilist Poltava (3)
- 1989 FC Avtomobilist Poltava (4)
- 1990 FC Avtomobilist Poltava (5)
- 1991 Psel Hadiach (1)
- =independence of Ukraine=
- 1992 FC Naftokhimik Kremenchuk (1)
- 1993 FC Lokomotyv Hrebinka (1)
- 1994 FC Lokomotyv Hrebinka (2)
- 1995 FC Velta Poltava (1)
- 1996 FC Lokomotyv Hrebinka (3)
- 1997 Psel Hadiach (2)
- 1998 Psel Hadiach (3)
- 1999 Psel Hadiach (4)
- 2000 Psel Hadiach (5)
- 2001 FC Pyriatyn (1)
- 2002 FC ZemliaK Myrhorod (1)
- 2003 FC ZemliaK Myrhorod (2)
- 2004 FC Kremin Kremenchuk (2)
- 2005 FC Kremin Kremenchuk (3)
- 2006 FC Velyka Bahachka (1)
- 2007 FC Velyka Bahachka (2)
- 2008 FC Velyka Bahachka (3)
- 2009 FC Velyka Bahachka (4)
- 2010 FC Velyka Bahachka (5)
- 2011 FC Temp Hradyzk (1)
- 2012 FC Nove Zhyttia Andriivka (1)
- 2013 FC Nove Zhyttia Andriivka (2)
- =Russo-Ukrainian War=
- 2014 SC Poltava (1)
- 2015 FC Rokyta (1)
- 2016 FC Olimpiya Savyntsi (1)
- 2017 FC Olimpiya Savyntsi (2)
- 2018 FC Olimpiya Savyntsi (3)
- 2019 FC Olympiya Savyntsi (4)
- 2020 FC Olimpiya Savyntsi (5)
- 2021 FC KLF Poltava (1)
- =full-scale Russian invasion=
- 2022 FC Standart Novi Sanzhary (1)
- 2023 FC Olimpiya Savyntsi (6)
- 2024 FC Rokyta (2)
- 2025 FC Olimpiya Savyntsi (7)
- 2026 FC Olimpiya Savyntsi (8)

=== Top winners ===
- 9 – Lokomotyv Poltava
- 8 – 2 clubs (Suputnyk Poltava, FC Olimpiya Savyntsi)
- 5 – 4 clubs (Avtomobilist Poltava, Velyka Bahachka, Vahonobudivnyk (Avanhard, Dzerzhynets), Psel Hadiach
- 3 – 4 clubs (Burevisnyk (Kooperator), Metalurh Kremenchuk, Lokomotyv Hrebinka, Kremin (Dnipro))
- 2 – 5 clubs (Spartak, Motor, ZemliaK, Nove Zhyttia, Rokyta)
- 1 – 17 clubs

== Professional clubs ==
During the Soviet period Poltava Oblast was represented only with 2 teams of masters from Poltava and Kremenchuk. Following the dissolution of the Soviet Union, the region's geography of football club widened to Lubny, Horishni Planvi, Myrhorod, Karlivka.

- FC Vorskla Poltava (Kolgospnik, Kolos, Selstroi, Stroitel), 1957–1982, 1987– (65 seasons)
  - FC Vorskla-2 Poltava, 1997–2005, 2024– (9 seasons)
- FC Kremin Kremenchuk (Dnepr), 1963–1969, 1989–2001, 2003– (42 seasons)
  - FC Kremin-2 Kremenchuk, 2022–2024 (2 seasons)

- FC Naftokhimik Kremenchuk, 1992-1996 (5 seasons)
- FC Vahonobudivnyk Kremenchuk, 1992-1996 (5 seasons)
- FC Sula Lubny, 1994–1995 (single season)
- FC Hirnyk-Sport Horishni Plavni, 1995– (30 seasons)
- FC Myrhorod (Petrivtsi), 1996–2000 (4 seasons)
- FC Adoms Kremenchuk, 1999-2001 (2 seasons)
- FC Poltava, 2007–2018 (11 seasons)
- FC Karlivka (Poltava-Karlivka-2), 2012–2014 (2 seasons)
- SC Poltava, 2021– (4 seasons)

== Other clubs at national/republican level ==
Note: the list includes clubs that played at republican competitions before 1959 and the amateur or KFK competitions after 1964. Until September of 1937 the Poltava's teams represented Kharkiv Oblast.

- Poltava combined team, 1936–1938,
- Kremenchuk combined team, 1936–1938
- Spartak Poltava, 1939, 1940, 1946, 1948, 1949, 1951
- Dynamo Poltava, 1947
- Dzerzhynets/Avanhard/Vahonobudivnyk Kremenchuk,
  1948–1950, 1952, 1956–1959, 1965, 1966, 1968, 1970, 1971, 1992/93, 1993/94
- VVS Poltava, 1948
- Lokomotyv Poltava, 1949–1955, 1957–1959, 1981, 1982, 1993/94
- Kolhospnyk Karlivka, 1951
- Kolhospnyk /Kolhospnyk-2/Vorskla Poltava, 1955, 1956, 1959, 1984–1986
- Suputnyk Poltava, 1964, 1967, 1969, 1970, 1978–1980
- Promin Poltava, 1972–1977
- Dnipro Kremenchuk, 1976
- Burevisnyk/Kooperator Poltava, 1977, 1978, 1983
- Naftovyk Kremenchuk, 1980–1982, 1989–1991
- Avtomobilist Poltava, 1983
- Naftovyk Karlivka, 1984
- Sula Lubny, 1985, 1987–1993/94, 1998/99
- Kremin/Kremin-Yunior Kremenchuk, 1986–1988, 1999, 2004, 2019/20
- Naftovyk Pyriatyn, 1987–1990
- Trud Karlivka, 1989
- Zoria Karlivka, 1990, 1991
- Hirnyk Komsomolsk, 1991–1994/95
- Lokomotyv Hrebinka, 1994/95, 1995/96
- Kremez Kremenchuk, 2000, 2002
- Myrhorod, 2000, 2001
- Naftovyk Hadiach, 2002
- Velyka Bahachka, 2006, 2007
- Nove Zhyttia Andriivka, 2011–2013
- Olimpia Savyntsi, 2020/21 – 2024/25
- SC Poltava, 2020/21
- Standart Novi Sanzhary, 2024/25

== Leadership ==
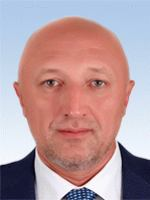
Valeriy Holovko third longest serving head of Football Association of Poltava Oblast

From 1948 to end of 2017 the Leadership position was known as the Head of Football Federation of Poltava Oblast. From 25 December 2017, position was known as Head of the public union "Football Federation of Poltava Region" which is now known as Head of the "Poltavshchyna Football Association" public union.

Office-holders
Name	Tenure
Danylo Matiushenko	14 March 1948 – 1950
Yurii Vintsentyk	1951–1952
Oleksandr Kobushko	1953–1957
Adam Nadin	1958–1960
Pavlo Savytskyi	1961–1963
Dmytro Yevsieiev	1964–1967
Danylo Matiushenko	1968–1971
Pavlo Liubchenko	1972–1990
Anatolii Shtryhol	1990
Anatolii Diachenko	1991–25 December 2012
Oleksandr Kudatskyi	2013–2017
Valeriy Holovko	25 December 2017 – 9 July 2024
Igor Kislov	9 July 2024–present

== See also ==
- FFU Council of Regions
- Poltava Oblast Super Cup
- Poltava Oblast Cup

== Sources ==
- Lomov, Anatolii; Stadnychenko, Oleksandr (2009), 100 Років Полтавському Футболу [100 Years of Poltava Football] (in Ukrainian), Poltava: Poltava, ISBN 978-966-97035-0-7
- Lomov, Anatolii (2019), Полтавщина спортивна в обличчях і фактах. [Sport in Poltava region in faces and facts.] (in Ukrainian), Poltava: PP Dyvosvit, ISBN 978-617-633-252-7
- Lomov, Anatolii; Kryvorotko, Serhii (2010), Энциклопедия Полтавского Футбола (1909-2010) [Encyclopedia of Poltava Football (1909-2010)] (in Russian), Poltava: OOO "ASMI", ISBN 978-966-182-118-6
