= Poltava Oblast Cup =

Annual Ukrainian football competition

- Organiser(s): Football Association of Poltava Oblast
- Founded: 1939; 87 years ago
- Region: Poltava
- Teams: 16 (2024–25)
- Current champions: Rokyta (1st title)
- Most championships: Lokomotyv Poltava (11 titles)
- Broadcaster: Football Association of Poltava Oblast

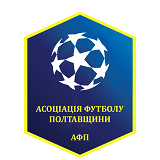
Poltava Oblast football association logo

The Poltava Oblast Football Cup, is an annual knockout football competition in Poltava Oblast Ukraine. It was first played during the 1939. It is organized by Football Association of Poltava Oblast. Rokyta is the current holder. They have won their first cup.

== History ==
On 12 June 1939 first season of the cup competition began. Final was played fifteen days later in Kremenchuk. Dynamo Kremenchuk became the first winner. Dynamo player Sikharulidze became the first player to score a hat-trick in the final. Next year the more teams took part in the competition. In 1941 a week before the invasion of the Soviet Union by Nazi Germany three matches of the cup took place. Season was abandoned with no winner. Cup resumed in 1946 with summer and fall competitions. Cup winner took part in the Soviet Cup. Three clubs have won the cup fifve time consecutively. Lokomotyv Poltava in 1950–54, Avanhard Kremenchuk in 1961–65 and Olympia Savyntsi 2014–18.

== Results ==
Key to list of winners
(R)	Replay
*	Match went to extra time
†	Match decided via a penalty shoot-out after extra time
‡	Winning team won the Double (Poltava Oblast Championship and Cup)
(I or II)	In 1990 and 91 two legs of the final were played.
(#)	Number of trophy won by club

Poltava Oblast Cup finals
Season	Winners	Score	Runners–up	Venue
1939	Dynamo Kremenchuk (1)	3–2	Spartak Kremenchuk	City Stadium, Kremenchuk
1940	Spartak Poltava (1)	0–0	Dynamo Kremenchuk	Dynamo Stadium, Poltava
1940	Spartak Poltava (1)	6–0 (R)	Dynamo Kremenchuk	Dynamo Stadium, Poltava
1941	Competition cancelled a week after start because of the World War II			
1942–45	No competition was played because of the World War II			
1946 (Summer) (Note: Cup tournament was played twice in June and in August.)	Burevisnyk Myrhorod (1)	4–2 * (Note: Score was 2–2 after 90 minutes.)	Spartak Kremenchuk	Dynamo Stadium, Poltava
1946 (Fall)	Spartak Poltava ‡ (2)	4–0	Burevisnyk Myrhorod	Dynamo Stadium, Poltava
1947	Dynamo Poltava ‡ (1)	3–2 * (Note: Score was 1–1 after 90 minutes.)	Air Force unit Poltava (Note: Club was also known as Poltava II.)	Dynamo Stadium, Poltava
1948	Air Force unit Poltava (1)	7–2	Mashynobudivnyk Karlivka	Dynamo Stadium, Poltava
1949	Spartak Poltava (3)	3–1	Pyriatyn city team #2	Dynamo Stadium, Poltava
1950	Lokomotyv Poltava ‡ (1)	2–0	Spartak Poltava	Lokomotyv Stadium, Poltava
1951	Lokomotyv Poltava (2)	7–3	Dzerzhynets Kremenchuk	Lokomotyv Stadium, Poltava
1952	Lokomotyv Poltava (3)	6–1	Batkivhschyna Lubny	Lokomotyv Stadium, (Note: Klykovskyi lists Urozhai Stadium) Poltava
1953	Lokomotyv Poltava ‡ (4)	2–0	Lokomotyv Hrebinka	Lokomotyv Stadium, Hrebinka
1954	Lokomotyv Poltava ‡ (5)	4–1	Kolhospnyk Karlivka	Lokomotyv Stadium, Poltava
1955	Enerhiia Poltava (1)	2–1	Avanhard Kremenchuk	Urozhai Stadium, Poltava
1956	Poltava combined team (1)	1–0	Pyriatyn raion combined team	Urozhai Stadium, Poltava
1957	Lokomotyv Poltava ‡ (6)	3–0	Avanhard-2 Kremenchuk	Kolhospnyk Stadium, Poltava
1958	Lokomotyv Poltava ‡ (7)	3–0	Avanhard Lubny	Lokomotyv Stadium, (Note: Klykovskyi lists Kolhospnyk Stadium) Poltava
1959	Lokomotyv Poltava (8)	5–1	Zenit Pyriatyn	Kolhospnyk Stadium, Poltava
1960	Dnipro Kremenchuk (1)	3–1	Lokomotyv Poltava	Kolhospnyk Stadium, Poltava
1961	Avanhard Kremenchuk (1)	1–0 * (Note: Score was 0–0 after 90 minutes)	Lokomotyv Poltava	Avanhard Stadium, (Note: Klykovskyi lists Urozhai Stadium, Poltava), Kremenchuk
1962	Avanhard Kremenchuk (2)	8–0	Spartak Novi Sanzhary	Avanhard Stadium, Kremenchuk
1963	Avanhard Kremenchuk (3)	3–0	Torpedo Lubny	Avanhard Stadium, Kremenchuk
1964	Avanhard Kremenchuk (4)	1–0	Metalist Lubny	Torpedo Stadium, Lubny
1965	Avanhard Kremenchuk ‡ (5)	3–0	Torpedo Lubny	Avanhard Stadium, Kremenchuk
1966	Suputnyk Poltava ‡ (1)	2–1 * (Note: Score was 1–1 after 90 minutes)	Avanhard Kremenchuk	Kolos Stadium, Poltava
1967	Avanhard Kremenchuk (6)	1–0	Suputnyk Poltava	Kolos Stadium, Poltava
1968	Promin Poltava (1)	1–1	Suputnyk Poltava	Kolos Stadium, Poltava
1968	Promin Poltava (1)	1–0 (R)	Suputnyk Poltava	Kolos Stadium, Poltava
1969	Zirka Poltava (1)	2–0	Lokomotyv Poltava	Lokomotyv Stadium, Poltava
1970	Promin Poltava (2)	2–0	Lokomotyv Poltava	Lokomotyv Stadium, Poltava
1971	Lokomotyv Poltava (9)	3–2	Promin Poltava	Kolos Stadium, Poltava
1972	Suputnyk Poltava ‡ (2)	1–0	Avanhard Kremenchuk	Kolos Stadium, Poltava
1973	Promin Poltava (3)	3–2	Lokomotyv Poltava	Kolos Stadium, Poltava
1974	Promin Poltava (4)	4–0	Suputnyk Poltava	Kolos Stadium, Poltava
1975	Suputnyk Poltava (3)	3–1	Promin Poltava	Kolos Stadium, Poltava
1976	Suputnyk Poltava (4)	2–1 *	Lokomotyv Poltava	Kolos Stadium, Poltava
1977	Promin Poltava (5)	3–2	Burevisnyk Poltava	Kolos Stadium, Poltava
1978	Burevisnyk Poltava (1)	4–0	Kharchovyk Velyka Bahachka	Lokomotyv Stadium, (Note: Klykovskyi lists Kolos Stadium, Poltava) Poltava
1979	DYuSSh Kolos Poltava (1)	2–1	Lokomotyv Poltava	Kolos Stadium, Poltava
1980	Lokomotyv Poltava ‡ (10)	1–0	Naftovyk Kremenchuk	Kolos Stadium, Poltava
1981	Suputnyk Poltava ‡ (5)	2–1	Naftovyk Kremenchuk	Kolos Stadium, Poltava
1982	Lokomotyv Poltava (11)	1–0 * (Note: Score was 1–1 after 90 minutes)	DYuSSh Kolos Poltava	Kolos Stadium, Poltava
1983	Avtomobilist Poltava (1)	4–1	Motor Poltava	Kolos Stadium, Poltava
1984	Avtomobilist Poltava ‡ (2)	4–2	Motor Poltava	Kolos Stadium, Poltava
1985	Avtomobilist Poltava (3)	1–0	Lokomotyv Poltava	Kolos Stadium, Poltava
1986	Motor Poltava ‡ (1)	5–2	Kharchovyk Artemivka	Unknown Stadium, Poltava
1987	Sula Lubny (1)	2–0	Kremin Kremenchuk	Kolos Stadium, Poltava
1988	Naftovyk Pyriatyn (1)	1–1 † (Note: Score was 1–1 after 90 minutes and extra time. Naftovyk won the penalty shoot-out 9–8.)	Sula Lubny	Kolos Stadium, Poltava
1989	Sula Lubny (2)	3–2 * (Note: Score was 2–2 after 90 minutes)	Trud Karlivka	Kolos Stadium, Poltava
1990	Sula Lubny (3)	5–0 (I)	Avtomobilist Poltava	Tsentralnyi Stadion, Lubny
1990	Sula Lubny (3)	0–1 (II)	Avtomobilist Poltava	Lokomotyv Stadium, Poltava
1991	Sula Lubny (4)	0–2 (I)	Naftokhimik Kremenchuk	Naftokhimik Stadium, Kremenchuk
1991	Sula Lubny (4)	4–1 (II)	Naftokhimik Kremenchuk	Tsentralnyi Stadion, Lubny
1992	Naftokhimik Kremenchuk ‡ (1)	2–0	Vahonobudivnyk Kremenchuk	Unknown Stadium, Poltava
1992–93	Naftokhimik Kremenchuk (2)	1–0	Sula Lubny	Lokomotyv Stadium, Poltava
1993–94	Vahonobudivnyk Kremenchuk (1)	4–2 * (Note: Score was 1–1 after 90 minutes)	Sula Lubny	Vorskla Stadium, (Note: Other sourse lists Lokomotyv Stadium) Poltava
1994–95	Velta Poltava ‡ (1)	2–0	Lokomotyv Hrebinka	Unknown Stadium, Poltava
1995–96	Final match between Lokomotyv Hrebinka and Vahonobudivnyk Kremenchuk did not happen. (Note: Vahonobudivnyk was disbanded three month before final.)			
1996–97	Nyva Reshetylivka (1)	0–0 † (Note: Score was 0–0 after 90 minutes and extra time. Nyva won the penalty shoot-out 5–4.)	Psel Hadiach	Dynamo Stadium, Poltava
1997–98	Sula Lubny (5)	2–2 † (Note: Score was 1–1 after 90 minutes and 2–2 after extra time. Sula won the penalty shoot-out 4–2.)	Maiak Rokyta	Aviator Stadium, Poltava
1998–99	Psel Hadiach ‡ (1)	1–0	Adoms Kremenchuk	Aviator Stadium, Poltava
1999–2000	Psel Hadiach ‡ (2)	1–0	Pyriatyn	Aviator Stadium, Poltava
2000–01	Sula Lubny (5)	w/o (Note: Maiak arrived for the game, was disqualified for having ineligible players.)	Maiak Rokyta	Aviator Stadium, Poltava
2001–02	Zemliak Myrhorod ‡ (1)	3–0	Psel Hadiach	Lokomotyv Stadium, Hrebinka
2002–03	Naftovyk-Psel Hadiach (1)	3–1	Kremez	Tsentralnyi Stadion, Lubny
2003–04	Kremin Kremenchuk ‡ (2)	2–0	Zemliak Myrhorod	Vorskla Stadium, Poltava
2004–05	PZMS Poltava (1)	2–0	Lubny	Lokomotyv Stadium, Poltava
2005–06	Lubny (7)	1–0	PZMS Poltava	Yunist Stadium, Horishni Plavni
2007	Lubny (8)	2–1	Hirnyk Kremenchuk	Lokomotyv Stadium, Hrebinka
2008	Velyka Bahachka ‡ (1)	2–1	Lokomotyv Hrebinka	Kolos Stadium, Velyka Bahachka
2009	Velyka Bahachka ‡ (2)	2–0	Zhorzhivka	Vorskla Stadium, Poltava
2010	Nove Zhyttia Andriivka (1)	3–1	Velyka Bahachka	Polytechnic Stadium, Kremenchuk
2011	Nove Zhyttia Andriivka (2)	4–1	Rokyta	Yunist Stadium, Horishni Plavni
2012	Flaminho Komsomolsk (1)	2–0	Dynamo Reshetylivka	Yunist Stadium, Horishni Plavni
2013	Nove Zhyttia Andriivka ‡ (3)	4–0 * (Note: Score was 0–0 after 90 minutes)	Temp Hradyzk	Mashynobudivnyk Stadium, Karlivka
2014	Olympia Savyntsi (1)	2–1	Nove Zhyttia Andriivka	Ltava Stadium, Poltava
2015	Olympia Savyntsi (2)	1–1 † (Note: Score was 1–1 after 90 minutes and extra time. Olympia won the penalty shoot-out 4–2.)	Hlobyne	Ltava Stadium, Poltava
2016	Olympia Savyntsi ‡ (3)	4–1	Velyka Bahachka	Dynamo Stadium, Poltava
2017	Olympia Savyntsi ‡ (4)	2–0	Rokyta	Dynamo Stadium, Poltava
2018	Olympia Savyntsi ‡ (5)	2–0	Kolos Lazirky	Lokomotyv Stadium, Poltava
2019	Lehion Poltava (1)	1–0	Olympia Savyntsi	Yuvileiny Stadium, Pyriatyn
2020	Olympia Savyntsi ‡ (6)	1–0	SC Poltava	Kremin-Arena, Kremenchuk
2021	KLF Poltava ‡ (1)	1–0	Standart Novi Sanzhary	Vorskla Stadium, Poltava
2022	Olympia Savyntsi (7)	3–1	Standart Novi Sanzhary	Yunist Stadium, Horishni Plavni
2023	Olympia Savyntsi ‡ (8)	2–0	Rokyta	Standart Stadium, Novi Sanzhary
2024	Olympia Savyntsi (9)	3–0	Rokyta	Yunist Stadium, Horishni Plavni
2025	Rokyta (1)	1–0	Lubny	Vorskla Stadium, Poltava

== Sources ==
- Lomov, Anatolii; Stadnychenko, Oleksandr (2009), 100 Років Полтавському Футболу [100 Years of Poltava Football] (in Ukrainian), Poltava: Poltava, ISBN 978-966-97035-0-7
- Lomov, Anatolii; Kryvorotko, Serhii (2010), Энциклопедия Полтавского Футбола (1909-2010) [Encyclopedia of Poltava Football (1909-2010)] (in Russian), Poltava: OOO "ASMI", ISBN 978-966-182-118-6
- Klykovskyi, Serhii (2010), Лубенському футболу 90 років [90 Years of Football in Lubny] (in Ukrainian), Lubny
