= 1940 in Soviet football =

Football in the Soviet Union
- Season: 1940

Men's football
- Group A: Dinamo Moscow
- Group B: Krasnaya Zaria Leningrad
- Soviet Cup: cancelled
- All-Union Committee Cup: cancelled

The 1940 Soviet football championship was the 10th seasons of competitive football in the Soviet Union. Dinamo Moscow won the championship becoming the winner of Group A for the third time.

== Honours ==
Competition	Winner	Runner-up
Group A	Dinamo Moscow (3)	Dinamo Tbilisi
Group B	Krasnaya Zaria Leningrad	Spartak Leningrad

Notes = Number in parentheses is the times that club has won that honour. * indicates new record for competition

== Soviet Union football championship ==
=== Group A ===
Pos	Republic	Team	Pld	W	D	L	GF	GA	GR	Pts
1	Russian SFSR	Dynamo Moscow	24	16	4	4	74	30	2.467	36
2	Georgian SSR	Dynamo Tbilisi	24	15	4	5	56	30	1.867	34
3	Russian SFSR	Spartak Moscow	24	13	5	6	54	35	1.543	31
4	Russian SFSR	CDKA Moscow	24	10	9	5	46	35	1.314	29
5	Russian SFSR	Dynamo Leningrad	24	11	5	8	47	44	1.068	27
6	Russian SFSR	Lokomotiv Moscow	24	10	5	9	36	52	0.692	25
7	Russian SFSR	Traktor Stalingrad	24	8	7	9	38	37	1.027	23
8	Ukrainian SSR	Dynamo Kiev	24	6	9	9	32	49	0.653	21
9	Russian SFSR	Krylia Sovetov Moscow	24	6	7	11	26	34	0.765	19
10	Russian SFSR	Zenit Leningrad	24	6	6	12	37	42	0.881	18
11	Russian SFSR	Torpedo Moscow	24	6	6	12	36	50	0.720	18
12	Ukrainian SSR	Stakhanovets Stalino	24	6	4	14	32	43	0.744	16
13	Russian SFSR	Metallurg Moscow	24	5	5	14	37	70	0.529	15
14	Georgian SSR	Lokomotiv Tbilisi	0	0	0	0	0	0	—	0

Source: rsssf.com

=== Group B ===
Pos	Republic	Team	Pld	W	D	L	GF	GA	GR	Pts
1	Russian SFSR	Krasnaya Zaria Leningrad (Note: Krasnaya Zaria Leningrad and Avangard Leningrad were merged with Zenit Leningrad (Gruppa A) for the next season.) (C, P)	26	15	5	6	54	36	1.500	35
2	Russian SFSR	Spartak Leningrad (P)	26	13	8	5	46	29	1.586	34
3	Azerbaijan SSR	Stroitel Baku	26	12	7	7	39	29	1.345	31
4	Ukrainian SSR	Dinamo Kharkov	26	12	5	9	44	37	1.189	29
5	Ukrainian SSR	Pischevik Odessa (P)	26	12	4	10	49	40	1.225	28
6	Byelorussian SSR	Dinamo Minsk (P)	26	10	6	10	42	41	1.024	26
7	Ukrainian SSR	Lokomotiv Kiev	26	11	4	11	33	34	0.971	26
8	Ukrainian SSR	Sudostroitel Nikolayev	26	9	8	9	25	31	0.806	26
9	Russian SFSR	Torpedo Gorkiy	26	8	9	9	44	47	0.936	25
10	Russian SFSR	Burevestnik Moscow	26	10	5	11	28	31	0.903	25
11	Russian SFSR	Avangard Leningrad	26	12	1	13	40	51	0.784	25
12	Russian SFSR	Pischevik Moscow	26	7	6	13	31	40	0.775	20
13	Ukrainian SSR	Selmash Kharkov	26	6	5	15	41	53	0.774	17
14	Armenian SSR	Spartak Yerevan	26	4	9	13	25	42	0.595	17

(C) Champions; (P) Promoted

=== Top goalscorers ===
Group A

- Grigoriy Fedotov (CDKA Moscow), Sergey Solovyov (Dinamo Moscow) – 21 goals

== Republican level ==
Football competitions of union republics

=== Football championships ===
- Azerbaijan SSR – Lokomotiv Baku
- Armenian SSR – Spartak Yerevan
- Belarusian SSR – DKA Minsk (see Football Championship of the Belarusian SSR)
- Estonian SSR – unknown
- Georgian SSR – Dinamo Batumi
- Kazakh SSR – none
- Karelo-Finish SSR – unknown
- Kirgiz SSR – Spartak Frunze
- Latvian SSR – unfinished
- Lithuanian SSR – unknown
- Moldavian SSR – city of Kishinev
- Russian SFSR – none
- Tajik SSR – none
- Turkmen SSR – none
- Uzbek SSR – none
- Ukrainian SSR – Lokomotyv Zaporizhia (see 1940 Football Championship of the Ukrainian SSR)

=== Football cups ===
- Azerbaijan SSR – Dinamo Baku
- Armenian SSR – Dinamo Leninakan
- Belarusian SSR – Dinamo Minsk
- Estonian SSR – unknown
- Georgian SSR – unknown
- Kazakh SSR – Dinamo Alma-Ata
- Karelo-Finish SSR – Kem
- Kirgiz SSR – Spartak Frunze
- Latvian SSR – unknown
- Lithuanian SSR – unknown
- Moldavian SSR – unknown
- Russian SFSR – Osnova Ivanovo
- Tajik SSR – Dinamo Stalinabad
- Turkmen SSR – Dinamo Ashkhabad
- Uzbek SSR – Dinamo Tashkent
- Ukrainian SSR – FC Dynamo Dnipropetrovsk (see 1940 Cup of the Ukrainian SSR)
