= Zirka (disambiguation) =

Zirka is a village in Russia.

Zirka may also refer to:

== People ==
- Zirka Frometa, Cuban chess player
- Zirka Menzatyuk, Ukrainian children's book author and journalist

== Other ==
- FC Zirka Kropyvnytskyi, Ukraine
- FC Zirka Lubny, former football club, Ukrainian SSR
- Zirka Stadium, Ukraine
