= 2025 Football Championship of Poltava Oblast =

Football Championship of Poltava Oblast
- Season: 2025
- Dates: 10 May 2025 – 18 October 2025

The 2025 Football Championship of Poltava Oblast began on 10 May 2025. Rokyta are the defending champions.

== Teams ==
16 teams are taking part in this years competition. 8 are participating in Vyshcha Liha, the other 8 teams are playing in First League. Both leagues will conduct a double round-robin tournament. 2025 is the first year that will not feature multiple rounds. Vyshcha Liha clubs are Kremin Academy, Olimpiia, Budivelnyk, Avrora, Invasport, Lubny, Reshetylivka and Rokyta.

== Vyshcha Liha ==
=== Stadiums and locations ===
Home venues of teams in the 2025 Vyshcha Liha

Note: Table lists in alphabetical order.

Team	Location	Stadium	Capacity
Kremin Academy	Kremenchuk	Kremin-Arena	1,566
Olympia Savyntsi	Myrhorod	Start	1,500
Budivelnyk Kremechuk	Kremenchuk	Kremin-Arena	1,566
Avrora Poltava	Poltava	Lokomotyv Stadium	3,700
Invasport	Kopyly	FC Poltava	500
Lubny	Lubny	Torpedo	350
Reshetylivka	Novi Sanzhary	Standart	500
Rokyta	Rokyta	Maiak	600

=== Table ===
Pos	Team	Pld	W	D	L	GF	GA	GD	Pts
1	Olympia Savyntsi	11	8	2	1	32	5	+27	26
2	Lubny	11	8	0	3	22	14	+8	24
3	Rokyta	11	7	1	3	45	9	+36	22
4	Reshetylivka	11	5	1	5	26	12	+14	16
5	Invasport Poltava	11	5	1	5	21	18	+3	16
6	Avrora Poltava	11	5	1	5	10	16	−6	16
7	Budivelnyk Kremenchuk	11	2	2	7	21	25	−4	8
8	Kremin Academy	11	0	0	11	4	82	−78	0

Updated to match(es) played on 9 September 2025. Source: start.uaf.ua
Rules for classification: 1) Points; 2) Head-to-head points.

=== Results ===
Teams play each other twice on a home and away basis. Round 6 matches scheduled for 21 and 22 June were rescheduled to 19 an 20 July.

Home \ Away	KRE	OLM	BUD	AVR	INV	LBN	RES	ROK
Kremin Academy	—	0–6	0–3	1–3	–	–	–	0–17 (Note: Rescheduled match, was played on 26 July.)
Olympia Savyntsi	11–0 (Note: Rescheduled match, was played on 12 July due to former manager of Olympia death.)	—	–	2–0	4–1 (Note: Rescheduled match, was played on 2 September, due to Olympia participation in 2025–26 Ukrainian Cup Round of 64.)	–	1–0 (Note: Rescheduled match, was played on 31 May.)	1–1
Budivelnyk Kremenchuk	11–1	1–2	—	0–0	2–2	1–2	0–1	–
Avrora Poltava	2–1	–	2–1	—	0–2	0–1	1–0	1–4
Invasport Poltava	7–0 (Note: Rescheduled match, was played on 19 July.)	1–0	–	0–1	—	4–1	2–1	1–2
Lubny	5–0	0–2	4–1	–	3–1	—	2–0	2–0
Reshetylivka	13–1	1–1	3–1	4–0	–	1–2	—	2–1
Rokyta	4–0	0–2	8–0	–	4–0	4–0	–	—

Updated to match(es) played on 9 September 2025. Source: start.uaf.ua
Legend: Blue = home team win; Yellow = draw; Red = away team win.

=== Goalscorers ===
Rank	Scorer	Team	Goals (Pen.)
1	(Ukraine) Andrii Misiailo	Rokyta	8 (2)
2	(Ukraine) Valentyn Shevchenko	Rokyta	7 (0)
2	(Ukraine) Roman Kirpichenko	Lubny	7 (5)
3	(Ukraine) Ivan Kuts	Rokyta	6 (1)
3	(Ukraine) Leonid Morozov	Invasport	6 (0)
3	(Ukraine) Andrii Rudenko	Olympia Savyntsi	6 (0)
3	(Ukraine) Vadym Loboda	Olympia Savyntsi	6 (0)
4	(Ukraine) Maksym Semyvolos	Reshetylivka	5 (0)
4	(Ukraine) Ruslan Kholiavko	Budivelnyk	5 (0)
4	(Ukraine) Serhii Karetnyk	Reshetylivka	5 (0)
5	(Ukraine) Ruslan Balakshii	Avrora	4 (0)
5	(Ukraine) Ivan Rudzevych	Invasport	4 (0)
5	(Ukraine) Yevhen Spivak	Olympia Savyntsi	4 (0)
5	(Ukraine) Ihor Reutov	Invasport	4 (0)

1 own goal

- (Ukraine) Pavlo Khomenko (Avrora, against Budivelnyk)
- (Ukraine) Dmytro Smal (Kremin Academy, against Olympia Savyntsi)

== First League ==
Note: Table lists in alphabetical order.

Team	Location	Stadium	Capacity
Kolos Kobeliaky	Kobeliaky	Kolos	
Lokomotyv Hrebinka	Hrebinka	Lokomotyv Stadium	
Molod Poltava	Poltava	Dynamo Stadium	300
Myrhorod	Myrhorod	Start Stadium	1,500
Opishnia	Opishnia	Hubar Stadium	
Peremoha Klepachi	Shyshaky	Druzhba Stadium	
Pyriatyn	Pyriatyn	Yuvileinyi	
Sencha	Sencha	Kolos	

=== Table ===
Pos	Team	Pld	W	D	L	GF	GA	GD	Pts	Qualification or relegation
1	Pyriatyn	9	9	0	0	37	9	+28	27	
2	Opishnia	10	7	0	3	23	16	+7	21	
3	Molod Poltava	10	6	0	4	35	21	+14	18	
4	Peremoha Klepachi	10	5	0	5	24	17	+7	15	
5	Kolos Kobeliaky	9	3	0	6	18	25	−7	9	
6	Lokomotyv Hrebinka	9	2	0	7	9	29	−20	6	
7	Sencha	9	1	0	8	18	47	−29	3	
8	Myrhorod (W)	0	0	0	0	0	0	0	0	Withdrawn

Updated to match(es) played on 6 September 2025. Source: start.uaf.ua
Rules for classification: 1) Points; 2) Head-to-head points.
(W) Withdrawn

=== Results ===
Teams play each other twice on a home and away basis.

Home \ Away	OPI	PER	SEN	LOK	PYR	KOL	MOL
Opishnia	—	1–2	–	1–0	3–7	–	2–1
Peremoha Klepachi	0–1	—	7–2	–	1–3	4–0	–
Sencha	1–7	1–4	—	6–2 (Note: Rescheduled match, was played on 13 July.)	1–3	–	1–2
Lokomotyv Hrebinka	0–2	1–0	3–2	—	–	–	1–3
Pyriatyn	3–0	3–2	–	7–0	—	6–1	–
Kolos Kobeliaky	0–1	3–1	8–1	4–0	0–3	—	1–3
Molod Poltava	2–5	2–3	11–3	4–2	1–2	6–1	—

Updated to match(es) played on 8 September 2025. Source: start.uaf.ua
Legend: Blue = home team win; Yellow = draw; Red = away team win.

=== Goalscorers ===
Rank	Scorer	Team	Goals (Pen.)
1	(Ukraine) Anton Snisar	Pyriatyn	9 (0)
1	(Ukraine) Danylo Harmash	Peremoha Klepachi	9 (0)
2	(Ukraine) Oleh Nikiforov	Molod Poltava	6 (0)
2	(Ukraine) Maksym Suravikin	Pyriatyn	6 (0)
2	(Ukraine) Andrii Kostenko	Opishnia	6 (1)
3	(Ukraine) Bohdan Trus	Pyriatyn	5 (0)
3	(Ukraine) Vladyslav Lukash	Molod Poltava	5 (0)
3	(Ukraine) Denys Opara	Kolos Kobeliaky	5 (0)
3	(Ukraine) Illia Nadiuk	Molod Poltava	5 (0)
3	(Ukraine) Dmytrii Marchenko	Pyriatyn	5 (0)
4	(Ukraine) Volodymyr Dehterenko	Kolos Kobeliaky	4 (0)
4	(Ukraine) Roman Burman	Sencha	4 (0)

1 own goal

- (Ukraine) Dmytro Khmara (Opishnia, against Peremoha Klepachi)
- (Ukraine) Vladyslav Hyria (Opishnia, against Sencha)
- (Ukraine) Oleksii Munko (Kolos Kobeliaky, against Pyriatyn)
- (Ukraine) Ivan Kravchenko (Molod Poltava, against Pyriatyn)
