= MFC Mykolaiv-2 =

- Full name: MFC Mykolaiv-2
- Founded: 1937
- Ground: Park Peremohy Stadium, Mykolaiv
- Capacity: 1,000
- Chairman: Mykola Marchenko
- Head coach: Anatoliy Didenko
- League: Ukrainian Second League
- 2020–21: Ukrainian Second League, Group B, 12th of 12
- Website: https://mfc.mk.ua/
Home colours	Away colours

MFC Mykolaiv-2 is the 2nd squad of the Ukrainian football club MFC Mykolaiv.

== History ==
History of the MFC Mykolaiv second team could be easily traced to the 1937 Football Championship of the Ukrainian SSR where Sudnobudivnyk-2 Mykolaiv placed 6th out 7 participants.

Until 2017, the team played in various amateur level competitions. In 2017, it was admitted to the Ukrainian Second League. Its first game at professional level the team played on 16 July 2017 hosting SC Tavriya Simferopol at Tsentralny Misky Stadion in Mykolaiv. Its home stadium was announced Stadion Parka Peremohy.

Before the 2018–19 season, the team squad was refreshed with younger players from local Torpedo sports school of Olympic reserve.

== Current squad ==
As of 26 July 2021

Note: Flags indicate national team as defined under FIFA eligibility rules; some limited exceptions apply. Players may hold more than one non-FIFA nationality.

No.	Pos.	Nation	Player
24	MF	(Ukraine) UKR	Kyrylo Boychuk
28	GK	(Ukraine) UKR	Vitaliy Humennyi
38	FW	(Ukraine) UKR	Maksym Sula
57	DF	(Ukraine) UKR	Dmytro Serheyev
66	DF	(Ukraine) UKR	Bohdan Tsarynnyi

No.	Pos.	Nation	Player
76	DF	(Ukraine) UKR	Vladyslav Oleynikov
78	MF	(Ukraine) UKR	Oleksandr Kavedyayev
80	FW	(Ukraine) UKR	Dmytro Chilinhir
84	DF	(Ukraine) UKR	Danylo Lyubarskyi
86	DF	(Ukraine) UKR	Kyrylo Boyko
—	MF	(Ukraine) UKR	Serhiy Binevskyi

== Coaches ==
- 2017 – 2019 Vyacheslav Mazarati
- 2019 – present Volodymyr Ponomarenko

== League and cup history ==
=== Soviet Union ===
Season	Div.	Pos.	Pl.	W	D	L	GS	GA	P	Domestic Cup	Europe	Notes
1937	4th	6	6	1	2	3	6	14	10			
1939	4th	10	9	1	3	5	8	23	14			
1946	4th South	5	14	6	1	7	22	29	13			
1947	4th "Group 3"	2										
1948	4th "Group 7"	2										
1949	4th "Group 7"	6										

=== Ukraine ===
Season	Div.	Pos.	Pl.	W	D	L	GS	GA	P	Domestic Cup	Europe	Notes
2017–18	3rd	9	33	10	7	16	41	58	37			
2018–19	3rd	9	27	5	5	17	22	52	20			
2019–20	3rd	7	20	5	8	7	18	32	23			
2020–21	3rd	12	22	1	5	16	13	51	8			Withdrawn

== Honours ==
- Ukrainian Amateur Cup
  - Semi-finalists (1): 1959 (as Avanhard Mykolaiv)
