= 1939 Cup of the Ukrainian SSR =

The 1939 Ukrainian Cup was a football knockout competition conducting by the Football Federation of the Ukrainian SSR and was known as the Ukrainian Cup.

== Competition schedule ==
=== First elimination round ===
Stal Voroshylovsk	0:3	Zenit Stalino

=== Second elimination round ===
Lokomotyv Lozova	1:5	Stal Dniprodzerzhynsk
Stal Mariupol	2:1	Zenit Stalino
Avanhard Kramatorsk	3:0	Lokomotyv (imeni Kahanovycha) Popasna
Dynamo Vinnytsia	-/+	Dynamo Kamianets-Podilskyi	(previous score 2:1 was annulled due to an ineligible player)
Traktor Kharkiv	2:0	Stal Kostiantynivka
Lokomotyv zavodiv Zaporizhia	1:2	Blyskavka Kharkiv
Lokomotyv Pivdnia Voznesensk	+/-	Spartak Tiraspol	(no show)
Spartak Chernihiv	2:3	Lokomotyv Kyiv
Khachovyk Odesa	4:3	Rot-Front Kyiv
Silmash Kirovohrad	1:2	Rot-Front Smila
Stakhanovets Ordzhonikidze	2:1	Lokomotyv Pivdnia Dnipropetrovsk
Avanhard Druzhkivka	2:4	Lokomotyv Pivdnia Kharkiv
Avanhard Berdychiv	2:6	Snaiper Odesa
Stal Dnipropetrovsk	2:1	Zenit Kharkiv
Dynamo Kremenchuk	0:4	Sudnobudivnyk Mykolaiv
Tsukrovyk Sumy	1:0	Dynamo-2 Kyiv

=== Third elimination round ===
Stal Dniprodzerzhynsk	4:2	Stal Mariupol
Avanhard Kramatorsk	9:0	Dynamo Kamianets-Podilskyi
Traktor Kharkiv	3:1	Blyskavka Kharkiv
Lokomotyv Pivdnia Voznesensk	4:3	Lokomotyv Kyiv
Rot-Front Smila	2:0	Kharchovyk Odesa
Stakhanovets Ordzhonikidze	4:2	Lokomotyv Pivdnia Kharkiv
Snaiper Odesa	3:2	Stal Dnipropetrovsk
Sudnobudivnyk Mykolaiv	4:0	Tsukrovyk Sumy

=== Quarterfinals ===
Stal Dniprodzerzhynsk	1:2	Avanhard Kramatorsk	3:2 (first game interrupted due to poor visibility, late hour), 2:2 second game tied and replayed)
Traktor Kharkiv	3:0	Lokomotyv Pivdnia Voznesensk
Kharchovyk Odesa	4:0	Stakhanovets Ordzhonikidze	0:0 (first game tied and replayed)
Snaiper Odesa	2:0	Sudnobudivnyk Mykolaiv

=== Semifinals ===
Avanhard Kramatorsk	2:1	Traktor Kharkiv
Kharchovyk Odesa	3:1	Snaiper Odesa	1:1 (first game tied and replayed)

=== Final ===
30 July 1939

Avanhard Kramatorsk	2–0	Kharchovyk Odesa

== Top goalscorers ==
Scorer	Goals	Team
(Ukrainian Soviet Socialist Republic)	?	

Ukrainian Cup 1939 Winners

FC Mashynobudivnyk Kyiv
Second title

== See also ==
- 1939 Football Championship of the Ukrainian SSR
- Soviet Cup
- Ukrainian Cup
