= 1946 Cup of the Ukrainian SSR =

The 1946 Ukrainian Cup was a football knockout competition conducting by the Football Federation of the Ukrainian SSR and was known as the Ukrainian Cup.

== Competition schedule ==
=== First elimination round ===
Most games of the round took place on 29 September 1946.

Fastiv	3:2	Lokomotyv Kyiv
Dynamo Lviv	5:2	Bilshovyk Zaporizhia
DO Zhitomir	1:3	Spartak Chernivtsi
Portovyk Odesa	6:0	Spartak Izmail
Sudnobudivnyk Mykolaiv	3:0	Dynamo Kherson
Stal Dniprodzerzhynsk	6:0	VVS Odessa
Stakhanovets Kadiivka	1:2	Stal Makiivka
Dynamo Sumy	3:2	Dzerzhynets Kharkiv
Dynamo Voroshylovhrad	2:1	Stal Mariupol
Silmash Kharkiv	2:0	Spartak Poltava
Dynamo Rivne	+/-	Spartak Dnipropetrovsk	5:5 (first replay on 29 September), 1:1 (second replay on 30 September, abandoned before the end)
Spartak Drohobych	+/-	Dynamo Mukachevo	1:1 (no show on 3 October)

=== Second elimination round ===
The main date for games was on 6 October 1946.

Dynamo Kirovohrad	2:4	Spartak Kyiv
Stal Voroshylovsk	1:4	Stal Makiivka
Stal Dniprodzerzhynsk	+/-	Dynamo Sumy	(no show)
Portovyk Odesa	0:1	Sudnobudivnyk Mykolaiv
Spartak Lviv	0:1	Spartak Drohobych	(played on 7 October)
Silmash Kharkiv	1:0	Fastiv	(played on 8 October)
Dynamo Kharkiv	1:4	Dynamo Kyiv	2:2 (first game on 8 October), (second game on 9 October)
Lokomotyv Zaporizhia	1:2	Spartak Kyiv	(played on 9 October)
Vinnytsia	-/+	Spartak Chernivtsi	(no show or forfeit, date is unknown)

=== Third elimination round ===
The main date for games was on 13 October 1946.

Dynamo Lviv	7:1	Dynamo Rivne
Spartak Drohobych	5:0	Dynamo Lutsk
Dynamo Voroshylovhrad	4:1	Avanhard Kramatorsk	(played on 17 October)
Sudnobudivnyk Mykolaiv	5:3	Spartak Chernivtsi	(played on 20 October)

=== Fourth elimination round ===
The main date for games was on 20 October 1946.

Lokomotyv Kharkiv	4:0	Dynamo Kyiv
Sudnobudivnyk Mykolaiv	2:1	Traktor Kharkiv
Stal Dniprodzerzhynsk	1:2	Spartak Uzhhorod
Spartak Kherson	2:1	Spartak Drohobych
Kharchovyk Odesa	7:1	Dynamo Voroshylovhrad	(played on 24 October)
Shakhtar Stalino	4:0	Sudnobudivnyk Mykolaiv	(played on 25 October)
Dynamo Kyiv	2:0	Dynamo Lviv	(played on 27 October)
Spartak Kyiv	+/-	Stal Dnipropetrovsk	(no show or forfeit, date is unknown)

=== Quarterfinals ===
Sudnobudivnyk Mykolaiv	1:4	Lokomotyv Kharkiv	(played on 27 October)
Dynamo Kyiv	5:1	Spartak Kyiv	(played on 30 October)
Spartak Uzhhorod	2:1	Kharchovyk Odesa	(played on 2 November)
Spartak Kherson	1:2	Shakhtar Stalino	(played on 3 November)

=== Semifinals ===
All games were played in Kyiv.

Lokomotyv Kharkiv	+/-	Spartak Uzhhorod	(no show, date 8 November)
Dynamo Kyiv	2:1	Shakhtar Stalino	2:2 (first game played on 8 November), (second game played on 9 November)

=== Final ===
12 November 1946
14:30

Dynamo Kyiv	2–0	Lokomotyv Kharkiv
Vinkovatov 42', 45'

Dynamo Stadium, Kyiv
Attendance: 20,000
Referee: Kotov (Odesa)

== Top goalscorers ==
Scorer	Goals	Team
(Ukrainian Soviet Socialist Republic)	?	

Ukrainian Cup 1946 Winners

FC Mashynobudivnyk Kyiv
Second title

== See also ==
- Soviet Cup
- Ukrainian Cup
