= 1947 Football Championship of the Ukrainian SSR =

Football Championship of UkrSSR
- Season: 1947
- Champions: FC Bilshovyk Mukachevo

The 1947 Football Championship of UkrSSR were part of the 1947 Soviet republican football competitions in the Soviet Ukraine.

== Qualification group stage ==
=== Group 1 ===
Pos	Team	Pld	W	D	L	GF	GA	GD	Pts
1	Lokomotyv Kyiv	0	–	–	–	–	–	—	0
2	Vympel Chernihiv	0	–	–	–	–	–	—	0
3	Dynamo Dnipropetrovsk	0	–	–	–	–	–	—	0
4	1.Cherkaskyi FC	0	–	–	–	–	–	—	0
5	Dynamo Poltava	0	–	–	–	–	–	—	0

=== Group 2 ===
Pos	Team	Pld	W	D	L	GF	GA	GD	Pts
1	Dynamo Vinnytsia	3	2	1	0	8	4	+4	5
2	Dynamo Zhytomyr	3	1	2	0	8	6	+2	4
3	Traktor Kharkiv	3	1	1	1	9	4	+5	3
4	Dynamo Proskuriv	3	0	0	3	3	14	−11	0

=== Group 3 ===
Pos	Team	Pld	W	D	L	GF	GA	GD	Pts
1	Dynamo Kherson	0	–	–	–	–	–	—	0
2	Sudnobudivnyk-2 Mykolaiv	0	–	–	–	–	–	—	0
3	Dynamo Kirovohrad	0	–	–	–	–	–	—	0
4	Vodnyk Odesa	0	–	–	–	–	–	—	0
5	Spartak Izmail	0	–	–	–	–	–	—	0

=== Group 4 ===
Pos	Team	Pld	W	D	L	GF	GA	GD	Pts
1	Bilshovyk Mukacheve	0	–	–	–	–	–	—	0
2	Lokomotyv Ternopil	0	–	–	–	–	–	—	0
3	Dynamo Lutsk	0	–	–	–	–	–	—	0
4	Dynamo Stanislav	0	–	–	–	–	–	—	0

=== Group 5 ===
Pos	Team	Pld	W	D	L	GF	GA	GD	Pts
1	Dynamo Lviv	0	–	–	–	–	–	—	0
2	Bilshovyk Sambir	0	–	–	–	–	–	—	0
3	Rivne	0	–	–	–	–	–	—	0
4	Spartak Chernivtsi	0	–	–	–	–	–	—	0

=== Group 6 ===
Pos	Team	Pld	W	D	L	GF	GA	GD	Pts
1	Avanhard Kramatorsk	0	–	–	–	–	–	—	0
2	Lokomotyv Zaporizhia	0	–	–	–	–	–	—	0
3	Shakhtar Kadiivka	0	–	–	–	–	–	—	0
4	Dynamo Sumy	0	–	–	–	–	–	—	0

== Final ==
Pos	Team	Pld	W	D	L	GF	GA	GD	Pts
1	FC Bilshovyk Mukachevo	5	4	1	0	22	1	+21	9
2	FC Avanhard Kramatorsk	5	3	1	1	14	7	+7	7
3	FC Lokomotyv Kyiv	5	2	1	2	11	7	+4	5
4	FC Dynamo Kherson	5	2	0	3	5	14	−9	4
5	FC Dynamo Vinnytsia	5	1	1	3	5	17	−12	3
6	FC Dynamo Lviv	5	1	0	4	4	15	−11	2

== Champions' team roster ==
Players: Szidor, Zoltan Papp, Vasyl Hodynchak, Jozsef Egerváry, Yuliy Ponevach (Ponevacs), Katzer, Ludwig Nagy (Nadj), Rewti, Deziderij Kulj, Deziderij (Geza) Fialko, Vasyl (Laszlo) Bryzhak, Alexander Cicej, Wilhelm Gajlik, Vasyl Zubak, Mishko (Misko); Head coach: Karel Szabo

== Ukrainian clubs at the All-Union level ==
- First Group (1): Dynamo Kyiv
- Second Group (12): Lokomotyv Kharkiv, Kharchovyk Odesa, Shakhtar Stalino, Stal Dnipropetrovsk, Sudnobudivnyk Mykolaiv, ODO Kyiv, Spartak Lviv, Spartak Kherson, Spartak Uzhhorod, Dzerzhynets Kharkiv, Dynamo Voroshylovhrad, Bilshovyk Zaporizhia

== Number of teams by region ==
Number	Region	Team(s)	
Number	Region	Ukrainian SSR	All-Union
2 (2)	Kyiv Oblast	Lokomotyv Kyiv, Pershyi Cherkaskyi	Dynamo Kyiv, ODO Kyiv
1 (2)	Kharkiv Oblast	Traktor Kharkiv	Dzerzhynets Kharkiv, Lokomotyv Kharkiv
1 (1)	Donetsk Oblast	Avanhard Kramatorsk	Stakhanovets Stalino
1 (1)	Dnipropetrovsk Oblast	Dynamo Dnipropetrovsk	Stal Dnipropetrovsk
1 (1)	Mykolaiv Oblast	Sudnobudivnyk-2 Mykolaiv	Sudnobudivnyk Mykolaiv
1 (1)	Odesa Oblast	Vodnyk Odesa	Kharchovyk Odesa
1 (1)	Luhansk Oblast	Shakhtar Kadiivka	Dynamo Voroshylovhrad
1 (1)	Zaporizhia Oblast	Lokomotyv Zaporizhia	Bilshovyk Zaporizhia
1 (1)	Lviv Oblast	Dynamo Lviv	Spartak Lviv
1 (1)	Zakarpattia Oblast	Bilshovyk Mukachevo	Spartak Uzhhorod
1 (1)	Kherson Oblast	Dynamo Kherson	Spartak Kherson
1 (0)	Ternopil Oblast	Lokomotyv Ternopil	–
1 (0)	Poltava Oblast	Dynamo Poltava	–
1 (0)	Sumy Oblast	Dynamo Sumy	–
1 (0)	Chernihiv Oblast	Vympel Chernihiv	–
1 (0)	Zhytomyr Oblast	Dynamo Zhytomyr	–
1 (0)	Khmelnytskyi Oblast	Dynamo Proskuriv	–
1 (0)	Kirovohrad Oblast	Dynamo Kirovohrad	–
1 (0)	Vinnytsia Oblast	Dynamo Vinnytsia	–
1 (0)	Ivano-Frankivsk Oblast	Dynamo Stanislav	–
1 (0)	Volyn Oblast	Dynamo Lutsk	–
1 (0)	Rivne Oblast	Rivne	–
1 (0)	Chernivtsi Oblast	Spartak Chernivtsi	–
1 (0)	(Soviet Union) Drohobych Oblast	Bilshovyk Sambir	–
1 (0)	(Soviet Union) Izmail Oblast	Spartak Izmail	–
