= Igor Kislov =

Ukraine-born Turkmenistani footballer

Personal information
- Full name: Igor Nikolaevich Kislov
- Date of birth: 19 July 1966 (age 60)
- Place of birth: Donetsk, Ukrainian SSR, Soviet Union
- Height: 1.90 m (6 ft 3 in)
- Position: Forward

Youth career
- 1984: Shakhtar Donetsk
- 1985–1986: Tsvetmet Artyomovsk

Senior career*
| Years | Team | Apps | (Gls) |
| 1987 | Metalurh Kupiansk | 9 | (2) |
| 1987 | Metalist Kharkiv | 0 | (0) |
| 1988–1990 | Vorskla Poltava | 107 | (28) |
| 1990–1992 | Etar Veliko Tarnovo | 58 | (11) |
| 1993 | Sfaxien | 11 | (6) |
| 1993–1994 | Etar Veliko Tarnovo | 25 | (12) |
| 1994–1995 | Dunav Ruse | 14 | (12) |
| 1995–1996 | Etar Veliko Tarnovo | 24 | (3) |
| 1996–1998 | Vorskla Poltava | 52 | (9) |
| 1997–1998 | → Vorskla-2 Poltava | 4 | (2) |
| 1998–2000 | Zirka Kirovohrad | 48 | (13) |
| 1998–2000 | → Zirka-2 Kirovohrad | 5 | (2) |
| 2000–2001 | Tavriya Simferopol | 24 | (4) |
| 2001–2002 | Prykarpattya Ivano-Frankivsk | 10 | (1) |

International career
| 1998 | Turkmenistan | 2 | (3) |
- * Club domestic league appearances and goals

Igor Kislov (Ukrainian: Ігор Миколайович Кислов, romanized: Ihor Mykolaiovych Kyslov; born 19 July 1966) is a Ukraine-born former Turkmenistani international footballer, who played as a forward.

Kislov was born in Donetsk. He came to Poltava to play football. With Vorskla Poltava he finished second in the 1988 Soviet Second League, Zone 6. He played in Poltava for three seasons.

He is the first foreign player to become champion of Bulgaria – in 1991 he won the A PFG as part of the Etar Veliko Tarnovo team. He also won the 1990–91 Bulgarian Football Union's Cup. He later joined Dunav Ruse. After moving back to Vorskla, Kislov captained his team to third place in the 1996–97 Vyshcha Liha.

After Kislov finished playing, he worked as a principal at sports school Horpynka. He also was the head of the head of the physical education and sports department of the family, youth and sports department of the executive committee of the city council. Later he was the head of Poltava "All-Ukrainian physical culture and sports society "Ukraine".

On 9 July 2024 he was elected as Head of the "Poltavshchyna Football Association" public union.

== Honours ==
Vorskla

- Football Championship of the Ukrainian SSR runner-up: 1988
- Ukrainian Premier League third place: 1996–97

Etar

- Bulgarian League: 1990–91
- Bulgarian Football Union's Cup: 1990–91
