= 1940 Football Championship of the Ukrainian SSR =

Football Championship of UkrSSR
- Season: 1940
- Champions: FC Lokomotyv Zaporizhia

The 1940 Football Championship of Ukrainian SSR were part of the 1940 Soviet republican football competitions in the Soviet Ukraine. Competitions in all three tiers were conducted in the fall.

== Persha Hrupa ==
Promoted:

- (Druha Hrupa) Avanhard Horlivka
- (debut) Zenit Kharkiv
- (reinstated) Spartak Dnipropetrovsk

Relegated: Dzerzhynets Voroshylovhrad

Pos	Team	Pld	W	D	L	GF	GA	GD	Pts	LZA	AKR	SOR	STD	DVO	AHO	SPD	ZKH
1	FC Lokomotyv Zaporizhia	7	6	0	1	25	9	+16	19	—	4–1	2–1	2–4	2–0	4–0	6–2	5–1
2	FC Avanhard Kramatorsk	6	4	0	2	13	9	+4	14		—	3–1	5–0	1–2	+/-	?–?	3–2
3	FC Stakhanovets Ordzhonikidze	6	3	1	2	17	11	+6	13			—	5–0	2–2	4–3	4–1	?–?
4	FC Stal Dniprodzerzhynsk	6	3	1	2	13	17	−4	13				—	1–1	4–1	4–3	?–?
5	FC Dzerzhynets Voroshylovhrad	5	2	2	1	7	6	+1	11					—	2–0	?–?	?–?
6	FC Avanhard Horlivka	6	1	0	5	7	14	−7	8						—	?–?	3–0
7	FC Spartak Dnipropetrovsk	3	0	0	3	6	14	−8	3							—	?–?
8	FC Zenit Kharkiv	3	0	0	3	3	11	−8	3								—

- FC Stal Kostiantynivka withdrew from competitions

== Druha Hrupa ==
Promoted:

- (Tretia Hrupa) Tsukrovyk Sumy, Spartak Poltava
- (reinstated) Stal Voroshylovsk

Relegated: Sudnobudivnyk-2 Mykolaiv

Pos	Team	Pld	W	D	L	GF	GA	GD	Pts	TSS	S2M	STV	SPP	AVD	STS
1	FC Tsukrovyk Sumy	3	3	0	0	5	2	+3	9	—	3–1	+/-	2–1		
2	FC Sudnobudivnyk-2 Mykolaiv	3	2	0	1	10	3	+7	7		—	3–0	6–0		
3	FC Stal Voroshylovsk	3	1	0	2	5	4	+1	5			—	5–1		
4	FC Spartak Poltava	3	0	0	3	2	13	−11	3				—		
5	FC Avanhard Druzhkivka	0	0	0	0	0	0	0	0					—	
6	FC Stakhanovets Serho	0	0	0	0	0	0	0	0						—

== Tretia Hrupa ==
Promoted: Spartak Vinnytsia
Replaced: Voskhod Zhytomyr → Dynamo Zhytomyr, Dynamo Kamianets-Podilskyi → Dynamo Proskurov

Pos	Team	Pld	W	D	L	GF	GA	GD	Pts	SCH	DZH	SPV	SKI	DPR
1	FC Spartak Chernihiv	3	3	0	0	8	5	+3	9	—	3–2	3–2	2–1	
2	FC Dynamo Zhytomyr	3	2	0	1	12	4	+8	7		—	5–1	5–0	
3	FC Spartak Vinnytsia	3	1	0	2	5	8	−3	5			—	2–0	2–1
4	FC Silmash Kirovohrad	3	0	0	3	1	9	−8	3				—	
5	FC Dynamo Proskurov	0	0	0	0	0	0	0	0					—

== Ukrainian clubs at the All-Union level ==
- Group A (2): Dynamo Kyiv, Stakhanovets Stalino
- Group B (5): Dynamo Kharkiv, Sudnobudivnyk Mykolaiv, Silmash Kharkiv, Lokomotyv Kyiv, Kharchovyk Odesa

== Withdrawn ==
- (all-Union level) Stal (z-d im. Lenina) Dnipropetrovsk (1936), Stal (z-d im. Petrovskoho) Dnipropetrovsk (1939), Dynamo Dnipropetrovsk (1937), Traktor Kharkiv (1937), Spartak Kharkiv (1939), Spartak Kyiv (1937), Dynamo Odesa (1939, Dzerzhynets Voroshylovhrad (1939)
- (Republican) Spartak Kryvyi Rih, Kryla Rad Zaporizhia, Kharchovyk Tiraspol, Temp Vinnytsia, Stal Makiivka, Stakhanovets Krasnoarmiysk, Lokomotyv Synelnykove, Znannia Kherson, z-d im. Lenina Verkhiy, Stakhanovets Lysychansk, Lokomotyv Lozova, Lokomotyv Kharkiv, Lokomotyv Dnipropetrovsk, Dynamo-2 Kyiv, Zenit Stalino, Zenit Voroshylovhrad, z-d im. Stalina Stalino, z-d KinAp Odesa, UDKA Kyiv, Stalinets Kharkiv, Voskhod Zhytomyr, Dynamo Kamianets-Podilskyi, Krasnyi Luch, Chystiakove, Melitopol, Berdiansk, Berdychiv, Novohrad-Volynskyi, Korosten, Mohyliv-Podilskyi, Uman, Koziatyn, Voznesensk, Kremenchuk, Konotop, Smila, Kupiansk, Starobilsk, Artemivsk, Sloviansk

== Number of teams by region ==
Number	Region	Team(s)	
Number	Region	Ukrainian SSR	All-Union
3-1-0 (1)	Donetsk Oblast	Avanhard Kramatorsk, Avanhard Horlvika, Stal Kostiantynivka, Avanhard Druzhkivka	Stakhanovets Stalino
3-0-0 (1)	Dnipropetrovsk Oblast	Stakhanovets Ordzhonikidze, Stal Dniprodzerzhynsk, Spartak Dnipropetrovsk	Stal Dnipropetrovsk
1-2-0 (0)	Luhansk Oblast	Dzerzhynets Voroshylovhrad, Stal Voroshylovsk, Stakhanovets Serho	
1-0-0 (2)	Kharkiv Oblast	Zenit Kharkiv	Silmash Kharkiv, Dynamo Kharkiv
1-0-0 (0)	Zaporizhia Oblast	Lokomotyv zavodiv Zaporizhia	–
0-1-0 (1)	Mykolaiv Oblast	Sudnobudivnyk-2 Mykolaiv	Sudnobudivnyk Mykolaiv
0-1-0 (0)	Poltava Oblast	Spartak Poltava	–
0-1-0 (0)	Sumy Oblast	Tsukrovyk Sumy	–
0-0-1 (0)	Chernihiv Oblast	Spartak Chernihiv	–
0-0-1 (0)	Zhytomyr Oblast	Dynamo Zhytomyr	–
0-0-1 (0)	Khmelnytskyi Oblast	Dynamo Proskuriv	–
0-0-1 (0)	Kirovohrad Oblast	Silmash Kirovohrad	–
0-0-1 (0)	Vinnytsia Oblast	Spartak Vinnytsia	–
0-0-0 (2)	Kyiv Oblast	–	Dynamo Kyiv, Lokomotyv Kyiv
0-0-0 (1)	Odesa Oblast	–	Kharchovyk Odesa
0-0-0 (0)	(Moldavian Soviet Socialist Republic) Moldavian ASSR	–	–
0-0-0 (0)	Ivano-Frankivsk Oblast	–	–
0-0-0 (0)	Lviv Oblast	–	–
0-0-0 (0)	Volyn Oblast	–	–
0-0-0 (0)	Rivne Oblast	–	–
0-0-0 (0)	Ternopil Oblast	–	–
0-0-0 (0)	(Soviet Union) Drohobych Oblast	–	–

== See also ==
- 1940 Cup of the Ukrainian SSR
