= 1940 Cup of the Ukrainian SSR =

The 1940 Ukrainian Cup was a football knockout competition conducting by the Football Federation of the Ukrainian SSR and was known as the Ukrainian Cup.

== Competition schedule ==
=== First elimination round ===
Znannia Vinnytsia	0:2	Lokomotyv Pivdnia Kyiv
Spartak Rovno	4:1	Zolochiv team
Lokomotyv Zaporizhia	3:1	Nauka Kyiv
Spartak Lviv	8:1	Spartak Lutsk
Tsukrovyk Sumy	2:1	Spartak Chernihiv
Zenit Kharkiv	2:0	Zenit Voroshylovhrad	0:0 (replay)
Dynamo Stanislav	1:2	Lokomotyv Tarnopol
Spartak Drohobych	5:3	Spartak Stanislav

=== Second elimination round ===
Spartak Poltava	6:1	Silmash Kirovohrad
Zavod imeni Baranova Zaporizhia	1:0	Traktor Kharkiv
Lokomotyv Kharkiv	3:0	Avanhard Horlivka
Stal Dniprodzerzhynsk	3:1	Avanhard Fastiv
Dynamo Kharkiv	1:0	Znannia Kherson
Stal Dnipropetrovsk	3:1	Lokomotyv Kotovsk
Spartak Rovno	4:2	Spartak Drohobych
Sudnobudivnyk Mykolaiv	0:3	Dynamo Dnipropetrovsk	0:0 (first game replayed), 0:0 (second game replayed)
Zenit Kharkiv	1:0	Lokomotyv Pivdnia Kyiv
Stakhanovets Ordzhonikidze	1:2	Lokomotyv Odesa
Zenit Stalino	3:2	Lokomotyv Lozova
Tsukrovyk Sumy	1:4	Lokomotyv Zaporizhia
Spartak Lviv	8:1	Lokomotyv Tarnopol
Avanhard Berdychiv	3:0	Lokomotyv Voznesensk
Avanhard Kramatorsk	7:0	Azot Rovenky
Dynamo Kamianets-Podilskyi	+/-	Spartak Odesa

=== Third elimination round ===
Avanhard Berdychiv	4:2	Spartak Poltava
Stal Dniprodzerzhynsk	0:2	Lokomotyv Kharkiv
Zavod imeni Baranova Zaporizhia	1:2	Stal Dnipropetrovsk
Lokomotyv Odesa	2:1	Dynamo Kharkiv
Dynamo Dnipropetrovsk	3:0	Avanhard Kramatorsk
Lokomotyv Zaporizhia	2:1	Spartak Lviv
Zenit Kharkiv	5:1	Spartak Rovno
Zenit Stalino	7:0	Dynamo Kamianets-Podilskyi

=== Quarterfinals ===
Zenit Stalino	4:0	Stal Dnipropetrovsk
Dynamo Dnipropetrovsk	2:1	Zenit Kharkiv
Lokomotyv Kharkiv	3:0	Lokomotyv Zaporizhia
Lokomotyv Odesa	3:0	Avanhard Berdychiv

=== Semifinals ===
Zenit Stalino	1:3	Dynamo Dnipropetrovsk	0:0 (first game tied and replayed)
Lokomotyv Odesa	1:0	Lokomotyv Kharkiv

=== Final ===
1 September 1940

Dynamo Dnipropetrovsk	2–2	Lokomotyv Odesa

Dynamo Stadium, Dnipropetrovsk

2 September 1940

Dynamo Dnipropetrovsk	6–2	Lokomotyv Odesa

Dynamo Stadium, Dnipropetrovsk

== Top goalscorers ==
Scorer	Goals	Team
(Ukrainian Soviet Socialist Republic)	?	

Ukrainian Cup 1940 Winners

FC Mashynobudivnyk Kyiv
Second title

== See also ==
- 1940 Football Championship of the Ukrainian SSR
- Soviet Cup
- Ukrainian Cup
