= FC Motor Poltava =

Defunct professional football club based in Poltava, Ukraine

Motor Poltava
- Founded: 1983
- Dissolved: 1987
- Ground: Poltava
- Manager: Hryhorii Cherniavskyi

Football Club Motor Poltava (Ukrainian: ФК Мотор Полтава); was a Ukrainian Soviet football team based in Poltava, Ukraine.

== History ==
Motor Poltava was created by Yakiv Tsekmiisterenko at the Automobile transport company 2214 in Poltava. Former Vorskla Poltava defender Hryhorii Cherniavskyi became the team's only playing coach. Serhii Babko became the first captain. In its first season the team was the finalist in the Poltava Oblast Cup. In the next season they lost in the final again and came second in the championship. In 1985 the club won the championship. In 1986 they won the championship again. Yakiv Tsekmiisterenko, head of the Automobile transport company began planning for a training base and the club's own stadium. The club did not finish the 1987 season due to intense rivalry with Avtomobilist Poltava. Due to bad behavior on the pitch the club was dissolved and Avtomobilist was disqualified until the end of season.

== Honours ==
Poltava Oblast Championship

Winners (2): 1985, 1986
Runners-up (1): 1984

Poltava Oblast Cup

Winners (1): 1986
Runners-up (2): 1983, 1984,

Poltava Championship

Winners (1): 1983,
Runners-up (2): 1985, 1986

Poltava Cup

Winners (1): 1983,
Runners-up (1): 1986

== Managers ==
- Hryhorii Cherniavskyi (1983–1987)

== Sources ==
- Lomov, Anatolii; Stadnychenko, Oleksandr (2009), 100 Років Полтавському Футболу [100 Years of Poltava Football] (in Ukrainian), Poltava: Poltava, ISBN 978-966-97035-0-7
- Lomov, Anatolii; Kryvorotko, Serhii (2010), Энциклопедия Полтавского Футбола (1909-2010) [Encyclopedia of Poltava Football (1909-2010)] (in Russian), Poltava: OOO "ASMI", ISBN 978-966-182-118-6
- Lomov, Anatolii; Kryvyi, Anatolii (2013), Полтава футбольная от А до Я ( 1909 - 2013) [Poltava football club from A to Z (1909 - 2013)] (in Russian), Poltava: PP Dyvosvit, ISBN 978-617-633-067-7
