= FC Dynamo Poltava =

Football club based in Poltava, Ukraine

Dynamo Poltava
- Founded: 1928
- Ground: Dynamo Stadium, Poltava
- Capacity: 300

Football Club Dynamo Poltava (Ukrainian: ФК Динамо Полтава); is a Ukrainian football team based in Poltava, Ukraine. Club was one of the best in Poltava in 1930s.

== History ==
Physical culture and sports association "Dynamo" - Ukraine in Poltava region was established in early 1920s. In 1928 a football club was established. Best players in Poltava joined the team. In their second city championship the club finished first. They continued to win the city championships in 1930, 1931, 1932. In 1933 the championships finished tied Military Political School 1. A championship game was played and it finished in a nil-nil draw, a replay was also a goalless draw. During the second replay Dynamo won 2–1. They continued to win for two more years. In 1936 they unexpectedly played badly and lost the championship to Lokomotyv Poltava. For the next six years they did not perform well. In 1941 they managed to win the city cup. After Poltava was liberated and city championship was resumed, the club finished second. In 1946 they won the city cup again. Many leading city players joined the club including that years champions Spartak Poltava. In 1947 they won the championship, cup, city championship and city cup. They won the city championship and cup in 1950. After that the club chose not to play at the higher level, only playing in Poltava city competitions. Their only success came in 1979 city cup win. In 2002–03 championship, Dynamo took part in first league where they finished last.

== Honours ==
Poltava Oblast Championship

Winners (1): 1947
Runners-up (1): 1946

Poltava Oblast Cup

Winners (1): 1947

Poltava Championship

Winners (9): 1929, 1930, 1931, 1932, 1933, 1934, 1935, 1947, 1950
Runners-up (2): 1936, 1944

Poltava Cup

Winners (5): 1941, 1946, 1947, 1950, 1979

== Sources ==
- Lomov, Anatolii; Stadnychenko, Oleksandr (2009), 100 Років Полтавському Футболу [100 Years of Poltava Football] (in Ukrainian), Poltava: Poltava, ISBN 978-966-97035-0-7
- Lomov, Anatolii; Kryvorotko, Serhii (2010), Энциклопедия Полтавского Футбола (1909-2010) [Encyclopedia of Poltava Football (1909-2010)] (in Russian), Poltava: OOO "ASMI", ISBN 978-966-182-118-6
- Lomov, Anatolii (2019), Полтавщина спортивна в обличчях і фактах. [Sport in Poltava region in faces and facts.] (in Ukrainian), Poltava: PP Dyvosvit, ISBN 978-617-633-252-7
