= 1939 Football Championship of the Ukrainian SSR =

Football Championship of UkrSSR
- Season: 1939
- Champions: FC Lokomotyv zavodiv Zaporizhia

The 1939 Football Championship of UkrSSR were part of the 1939 Soviet republican football competitions in the Soviet Ukraine.

== Persha Hrupa ==
Promoted

- (Tretia Hrupa) Stakhanovets Ordzhonikidze
- (debut) Lokomotyv zavodiv Zaporizhia
- (reinstated) Lokomotyv Dnipropetrovsk

Replaced: Dynamo Mykolaiv → Sudnobudivnyk Mykolaiv

Pos	Team	Pld	W	D	L	GF	GA	GD	Pts	Qualification or relegation	LZZ	FKO	LYK	FSD	FAK	FSK	LYD	FSO	D2K	S2M	FZS
1	FC Lokomotyv zavodiv Zaporizhia	9	7	2	0	22	4	+18	25		—	2–0	4–2	0–0	1–0	1–1	6–0	1–0	1–0	6–1	—
2	FC Kharchovyk Odesa	9	6	1	2	19	6	+13	22	Promoted to All-Union competitions		—	1–1	3–1	0–1	+/-	9–0	1–0	2–1	3–0	—
3	FC Lokomotyv Yuga Kharkiv	9	5	2	2	11	9	+2	21	Withdrew after the season			—	+/-	2–0	+/-	2–0	0–3	1–1	3–0	—
4	FC Stal Dniprodzerzhynsk	9	3	3	3	17	12	+5	18					—	3–4	2–2	3–0	5–1	1–0	2–2	—
5	FC Avanhard Kramatorsk	9	4	1	4	16	15	+1	18						—	1–1	1–2	5–0	0–5	4–1	—
6	FC Stal Kostiantynivka	9	2	4	3	11	10	+1	17							—	2–3	+/-	3–1	2–2	—
7	FC Lokomotyv Yuga Dnipropetrovsk	9	3	1	5	11	28	−17	16	Withdrew after the season							—	2–4	3–0	1–1	4–3
8	FC Stakhanovets Ordzhonikidze	9	3	0	6	10	15	−5	15									—	2–0	0–1	1–2
9	FC Dynamo-2 Kyiv	9	2	1	6	10	13	−3	14	Withdrew after the season									—	2–0	—
10	FC Sudnobudivnyk-2 Mykolaiv	9	1	3	5	8	23	−15	14	Relegated to Druha Hrupa										—	—
11	FC Zenit Stalino (W)	0	0	0	0	0	0	0	0	Withdrew during the season	—	—	—	—	—	—	—	—	—	—	—

(W) Withdrew

== Druha Hrupa ==
Promoted: Zenit Voroshylovhrad (debut)
Relegated: Spartak Kryvyi Rih, Kryla Rad Zaporizhia, Spartak Dnipropetrovsk
Returning: Stakhanovets Sergo

Pos	Team	Pld	W	D	L	GF	GA	GD	Pts	Qualification or relegation	AVN	ZNT	STX	ADR
1	FC Avanhard Horlivka	3	2	0	1	12	4	+8	7	Promoted to Persha Hrupa	—	1–2	7–1	4–1
2	FC Zenit Voroshylovhrad	3	1	2	0	7	6	+1	7	Withdrew after the season		—	2–2	3–3
3	FC Stakhanovets Sergo	3	1	1	1	6	10	−4	6				—	3–1
4	FC Avanhard Druzhkivka	3	0	1	2	5	10	−5	4					—

- Before the season there withdrew Spartak Kryvyi Rih, Kryla Rad Zaporizhia, Spartak Dnipropetrovsk, Stal Voroshylovsk.

== Tretia Hrupa ==
Relegated: Spartak Chernihiv

Pos	Team	Pld	W	D	L	GF	GA	GD	Pts	Qualification or relegation	VSX	SPO	TSU	SCH	SIL	DYN
1	FC Voskhod Zhytomyr	4	2	1	1	3	2	+1	9	Withdrew after the season	—	1–1	-/+	2–1	+/-	—
2	FC Spartak Poltava	4	2	1	1	8	7	+1	9	Promoted to Druha Hrupa		—	6–2	1–4	+/-	—
3	FC Tsukrovyk Sumy	4	2	0	2	11	8	+3	8	Promoted to Druha Hrupa			—	1–2	8–0	1–0
4	FC Spartak Chernihiv	4	2	0	2	9	8	+1	8					—	2–4	—
5	FC Silmash Kirovohrad	4	1	0	3	4	10	−6	6						—	—
6	FC Dynamo Kamianets-Podilskyi	0	0	0	0	0	0	0	0	Withdrew after the season	—	—	—	—	—	—

== Ukrainian clubs at the All-Union level ==
- Group A (3): Dynamo Kyiv, Stakhanovets Stalino, Dynamo Odesa
- Group B (7): Silmash Kharkiv, Lokomotyv Kyiv, Spartak Kharkiv, Dynamo Kharkiv (reinstated), Sudnobudivnyk Mykolaiv (reinstated), Stal Dnipropetrovsk (reinstated), Dzerzhynets Voroshylovhrad (debut)

== Withdrawn ==
- (all-Union level) Stal (z-d im. Lenina) Dnipropetrovsk (1936), Dynamo Dnipropetrovsk (1937), Traktor Kharkiv (1937), Spartak Kyiv (1937)
- (Republican) UDKA Kiev (1936), z-d im. Stalina Stalino (1936), z-d KinAp Odesa (1936), Stalinets Kharkiv (1937), Vympel Kyiv (1937), Mariupol (1937), Rubizhne (1937), Stalinets Kharkiv (1937), Shostka (1937), Spartak Kryvyi Rih (1938), Kryla Rad Zaporizhia (1938), Spartak Dnipropetrovsk (1938), Stal Voroshylovsk (1938), Kharchovyk Tyraspol (1938), Temp Vinnytsia (1938), Krasnyi Luch (1938), Makiivka (1938), Chystiakove (1938), Melitopol (1938), Berdiansk (1938), Stakhanovets Krasnoarmiysk (1938), Lokomotyv Synelnykove (1938), Berdychiv (1938), Novohrad-Volynskyi (1938), Korosten (1938), Mohyliv-Podilskyi (1938), Uman (1938), Koziatyn (1938), Znannia Kherson (1938), Voznesensk (1938), Kremenchuk (1938), Konotop (1938), Smila (1938), z-d im. Lenina Verkhiy (1938), Stakhanovets Lysychansk (1938), Kupiansk (1938), Starobilsk (1938), Lokomotyv Lozova (1938), Artemivsk (1938), Sloviansk (1938), Stal Kryvyi Rih (1938)

== Number of teams by region ==
Number	Region	Team(s)	
Number	Region	Ukrainian SSR	All-Union
4-3-0 (1)	Dnipropetrovsk Oblast	Lokomotyv zavodiv Zaporizhia, Stal Dniprodzerzhynsk, Lokomotyv Dnipropetrovsk, Stakhanovets Ordzhonikidze, Spartak Kryvyi Rih, Kryla Rad Zaporizhia, Spartak Dnipropetrovsk	Stal Dnipropetrovsk
3-2-0 (1)	Donetsk Oblast	Avanhard Kramatorsk, Stal Kostiantynivka, Zenit Stalino, Avanhard Horlvika, Avanhard Druzhkivka	Stakhanovets Stalino
1-0-1 (3)	Kharkiv Oblast	Lokomotyv Kharkiv, Tsukrovyk Sumy	Silmash Kharkiv, Spartak Kharkiv, Dynamo Kharkiv
1-0-1 (1)	Mykolaiv Oblast	Sudnobudivnyk-2 Mykolaiv, Silmash Kirovohrad	Sudnobudivnyk Mykolaiv
1-0-0 (2)	Kyiv Oblast	Dynamo-2 Kyiv	Dynamo Kyiv, Lokomotyv Kyiv
1-0-0 (1)	Odesa Oblast	Kharchovyk Odesa	Dynamo Odesa
0-3-0 (1)	Luhansk Oblast	Stal Voroshylovsk, Zenit Voroshylovhrad, Stakhanovets Serho	Dzerzhynets Voroshylovhrad
0-0-1 (0)	Chernihiv Oblast	Spartak Chernihiv	–
0-0-1 (0)	Zhytomyr Oblast	Voskhod Zhytomyr	–
0-0-1 (0)	Poltava Oblast	Spartak Poltava	–
0-0-1 (0)	Khmelnytskyi Oblast	Dynamo Kamianets-Podilskyi	–
0-0-0 (0)	Vinnytsia Oblast	–	–
0-0-0 (0)	(Moldavian Soviet Socialist Republic) Moldavian ASSR	–	–

== See also ==
- 1939 Cup of the Ukrainian SSR
