= 2019 Football Championship of Poltava Oblast =

Football Championship of Poltava Oblast
- Season: 2019
- Champions: Olimpiya Savyntsi

The 2019 Football Championship of Poltava Oblast was won by Olimpiya Savyntsi.

== League table ==
Pos	Team	Pld	W	D	L	GF	GA	GD	Pts
1	Olimpiya Savyntsi (C)	18	16	2	0	53	4	+49	50
2	Lehion Poltava	18	14	2	2	50	12	+38	44
3	Kolos Velyki Sorochyntsi	18	12	1	5	33	16	+17	37
4	Poltava	18	10	4	4	45	15	+30	34
5	FC Velyki Krynky	18	8	3	7	27	27	0	27
6	Druzhba Ocheretuvate	18	6	1	11	18	27	−9	19
7	DYuFSh Vorskla Poltava	18	5	2	11	18	39	−21	17
8	FC Kobeliaky	18	5	1	12	22	37	−15	16
9	Invasport Poltava	18	4	2	12	18	43	−25	14
10	FC Lubny	18	1	0	17	6	70	−64	3

Source: "Чемпіонат Полтавської області 2019". Footboom. Archived from the original on 2020-06-27.
(C) Champions
