= FC Vahonobudivnyk Kremenchuk =

FC Vahonobudivnyk Kremenchuk is a Ukrainian amateur football club from Kremenchuk. It is a factory team of the Kryukiv Railway Car Building Works based at the right-bank neighborhood of Kremenchuk.

Previously the team (club) was known as Dzerzhynets from its founding until spring of 1953 and Avanhard from 1953 to 1969.

At republican competitions (Ukrainian SSR), the team made debut in 1948 competing in group 2. It became the first appearance of a team from Kremenchuk that represented a production enterprise. Previously the city of Kremenchuk was fielding a joint city team at republican competitions.

== League and cup history ==
| Season | Div. | Pos. | Pl. | W | D | L | GS | GA | P | Domestic Cup | Notes |
|---|---|---|---|---|---|---|---|---|---|---|---|
| 1994-95 | 4th | 4 | 42 | 14 | 9 | 19 | 38 | 54 | 51 | First Qualifying round | Promoted to Second League |

== Honours ==
- Poltava Oblast
  - Winners (5): 1948, 1952, 1955, 1965, 1970

Runners-up (7): 1951, 1957, 1958, 1966, 1967, 1968, 1991

Poltava Oblast Cup

Winners (7): 1961, 1962, 1963, 1964, 1965, 1967, 1994,
Runners-up (7): 1951, 1955, 1957, 1966, 1972, 1992, 1996,

== Sources ==
- Pyrukhin, Yurii, Энциклопедия кременчугского футбола [Encyclopedia of Kremenchuk football] (in Russian), Kremenchuk
- Lomov, Anatolii; Stadnychenko, Oleksandr (2009), 100 Років Полтавському Футболу [100 Years of Poltava Football] (in Ukrainian), Poltava: Poltava, ISBN 978-966-97035-0-7
