= FC Avtomobilist Poltava =

Defunct professional football club based in Poltava, Ukraine

Avtomobilist Poltava
- Founded: 1982
- Dissolved: 1997
- Ground: Poltava
- Manager: Yurii Marmach

Football Club Avtomobilist Poltava (Ukrainian: ФК Автомобіліст Полтава); was a Ukrainian Soviet football team based in Poltava, Ukraine.

== History ==
Avtomobilist Poltava was created by former Vorskla Poltava defender Yurii Marmach at the Automobile transport company 16012 in Poltava. He became the team's playing coach. Team participated in 1982 Poltava Cup where they were defeated by Lokomotyv Poltava and won the city championship. In 1983 team participated in 1983 KFK competition where they finished in last place in group 4. They also took part in Ukrainian SSR Cup for amateur clubs where they were defeated by Radyst Kirovohrad in 1/16. On 10 July 1983 team won its first Poltava Oblast Cup. 1984 was the most successful year in the club's history. They won all competitions they took part in, Oblast championship and cup and City championship and cup. Next year the team finished second in the championship and won the cup and city championship. Team did not participate in Oblast Championship in 1985. They won the cup and city championship. In 1987 team won the Oblast championship. In the cup they lost early on to winners Kremin. They also won the city cup after failing to do so the previous year. In 1988 team easily won the Oblast championship. They also won both city championship and cup. Next season team won the championship again. Team lost on penalties in the semifinal of the cup to winners Sula Lubny. On 29 November 1989 team played its first international match with Strela from Bulgaria. They also won both city championship and cup. In 1990 team lost in the cup final after being defeated 5–0 in first leg and winning 1–0 in the second. They won the championship again and became the second team in history of Poltava Oblast Championship to win four straight titles. Team failed to win the city championship and cup. Team stopped participating in the Oblast championship and cup, anly participating in city championship and winning city cup in 1991 and 1992. During 1993 team won the city championship. In 1994 team lost to Aviator in city cup. Team won the city championship cup in 1995. Championship only in 1996 and 1997. On 14 November 1996 they lost in the city cup final.

== Name change ==
- Avtomobilist Poltava (1982–1992)
- Avtomobilist-93 Poltava (1993–1995)
- Avtomobilist-Nord Poltava (1995–1997)

== Honours ==
Poltava Oblast Championship

Winners (5): 1984, 1987, 1988, 1989, 1990
Runners-up (1): 1985,

Poltava Oblast Cup

Winners (3): 1983, 1984, 1985
Runners-up (1): 1990

Poltava Championship

Winners (7): 1982, 1984, 1985, 1986, 1988, 1989, 1993,

Poltava Cup

Winners (7): 1984, 1985, 1987, 1988, 1989, 1991, 1992,
Runners-up (1): 1997,

== Managers ==
- Yurii Marmach (1982–1997)

== Sources ==
- Lomov, Anatolii; Stadnychenko, Oleksandr (2009), 100 Років Полтавському Футболу [100 Years of Poltava Football] (in Ukrainian), Poltava: Poltava, ISBN 978-966-97035-0-7
- Lomov, Anatolii; Kryvorotko, Serhii (2010), Энциклопедия Полтавского Футбола (1909-2010) [Encyclopedia of Poltava Football (1909-2010)] (in Russian), Poltava: OOO "ASMI", ISBN 978-966-182-118-6
