= FC Velta Poltava =

Defunct professional football club based in Poltava, Ukraine

Velta Poltava
- Founded: 1994
- Dissolved: 1995
- Ground: Lokomotyv Stadium, Poltava

Football Club Velta Poltava (Ukrainian: ФК Велта Полтава); was a Ukrainian Soviet football team based in Poltava, Ukraine.

== History ==
In 1994 Oleksandr Lemeshko and Anatolii Kryvyi both deputy general directors of Velta a joint Ukrainian-British company. Club won the 1994 Poltava city championship and cup. Volodymyr Voitenko and Ivan Sharii became playing coaches. Club won the championship and cup in their first year. At the end of the year Velta company was undergoing reorganization. That changed forced to club to end its short lived existence. Volodymyr Voitenko was one of the best coaches of the season. Four players were in the team of the season: Volodymyr Kramarenko, Oleksandr Voloshko, Anatolii Malata and Ivan Sharii.

== Honours ==
Poltava Oblast Championship

Winners (1): 1995

Poltava Oblast Cup

Winners (1): 1995

Poltava Championship

Winners (1): 1994

Poltava Cup

Winners (1): 1994

== Sources ==
- Lomov, Anatolii; Stadnychenko, Oleksandr (2009), 100 Років Полтавському Футболу [100 Years of Poltava Football] (in Ukrainian), Poltava: Poltava, ISBN 978-966-97035-0-7
- Lomov, Anatolii; Kryvorotko, Serhii (2010), Энциклопедия Полтавского Футбола (1909-2010) [Encyclopedia of Poltava Football (1909-2010)] (in Russian), Poltava: OOO "ASMI", ISBN 978-966-182-118-6
