= 1949 Football Championship of the Ukrainian SSR =

Football Championship of UkrSSR
- Season: 1949
- Champions: DO Kyiv
- Runner up: Metalurh Dniprodzerzhynsk

The 1949 Football Championship of UkrSSR was part of the 1949 Soviet republican football competitions in the Soviet Ukraine.

The competition in all groups was conducted as a single round robin tournament.

== Qualification group stage ==
=== Group 1 ===
Pos	Team	Pld	W	D	L	GF	GA	GD	Pts
1	DO Kyiv	0	–	–	–	–	–	—	0
2	DO Cherkasy	0	–	–	–	–	–	—	0
3	Mashynobudivnyk Kyiv	0	–	–	–	–	–	—	0
4	Mashynobudivnyk Smila	0	–	–	–	–	–	—	0
5	Chervonyi Prapor Kyiv	0	–	–	–	–	–	—	0
6	Mashynobudivnyk Berdychiv	0	–	–	–	–	–	—	0
7	Mashynobudivnyk Fastiv	0	–	–	–	–	–	—	0
8	Urozhai Boryspil	0	–	–	–	–	–	—	0

=== Group 2 ===
Pos	Team	Pld	W	D	L	GF	GA	GD	Pts
1	Spartak Poltava	0	–	–	–	–	–	—	0
2	Lokomotyv Poltava	0	–	–	–	–	–	—	0
3	Dzerzhynets Kremenchuk	0	–	–	–	–	–	—	0
4	Mashynobudivnyk Pryluky	0	–	–	–	–	–	—	0
5	Spartak Chernihiv	0	–	–	–	–	–	—	0
6	Mashynobudivnyk Sumy	0	–	–	–	–	–	—	0
7	Lokomotyv Konotop	0	–	–	–	–	–	—	0
8	Khimik Shostka	0	–	–	–	–	–	—	0
9	Spartak Sumy	0	–	–	–	–	–	—	0

=== Group 3 ===
Pos	Team	Pld	W	D	L	GF	GA	GD	Pts
1	Metalurh Dniprodzerzhynsk	9	7	1	1	34	8	+26	15
2	Metalurh Kryvyi Rih	0	–	–	–	–	–	—	0
3	Dynamo Dnipropetrovsk	0	–	–	–	–	–	—	0
4	Trudovi Rezervy Melitopol	0	–	–	–	–	–	—	0
5	Traktor Osypenko	0	–	–	–	–	–	—	0
6	Khimik Pavlohrad	0	–	–	–	–	–	—	0
7	Sudnobudivnyk Velykyi Tokmak	0	–	–	–	–	–	—	0
8	Enerhiya Zaporizhia	0	–	–	–	–	–	—	0
9	Metalurh Nikopol	0	–	–	–	–	–	—	0
10	Metalurh Novomoskovsk	0	–	–	–	–	–	—	0

=== Group 4 ===
Pos	Team	Pld	W	D	L	GF	GA	GD	Pts
1	Metalurh Voroshylovsk	5	5	0	0	30	2	+28	10
2	Chervonyi Prapor Kharkiv	0	–	–	–	–	–	—	0
3	Khimik Verkhniy	0	–	–	–	–	–	—	0
4	Khimik Rubizhne	0	–	–	–	–	–	—	0
5	Lokomotyv Kupiansk	0	–	–	–	–	–	—	0
6	Lokomotyv Izyum	0	–	–	–	–	–	—	0
7	Spartak Kupiansk (W)	0	–	–	–	–	–	—	0
8	Lokomotyv Dnipropetrovsk (W)	0	–	–	–	–	–	—	0

(W) Withdrew

=== Group 5 ===
Pos	Team	Pld	W	D	L	GF	GA	GD	Pts
1	Metalurh Kostyantynivka	0	–	–	–	–	–	—	0
2	Metalurh Zhdanov	0	–	–	–	–	–	—	0
3	Metalurh Yenakieve	0	–	–	–	–	–	—	0
4	Lokomotyv Yasynuvata	0	–	–	–	–	–	—	0
5	Lokomotyv Artemivsk	0	–	–	–	–	–	—	0
6	Avanhard Kramatorsk [klubnaya]	0	–	–	–	–	–	—	0
7	Shakhtar Horlivka	0	–	–	–	–	–	—	0
8	Metalurh Makiivka	0	–	–	–	–	–	—	0
9	Shakhtar Smolyanka	0	–	–	–	–	–	—	0
10	Shakhtar Druzhkivka	0	–	–	–	–	–	—	0

=== Group 6 ===
Pos	Team	Pld	W	D	L	GF	GA	GD	Pts
1	Vodnyk Odesa	0	–	–	–	–	–	—	0
2	Torpedo Odesa	0	–	–	–	–	–	—	0
3	Dynamo Odesa	0	–	–	–	–	–	—	0
4	Lokomotyv Kotovsk	0	–	–	–	–	–	—	0
5	Lokomotyv Haivoron	0	–	–	–	–	–	—	0
6	Spartak Izmayil	0	–	–	–	–	–	—	0
7	DO Izmayil	0	–	–	–	–	–	—	0
8	Lokomotyv Rozdilna	0	–	–	–	–	–	—	0

=== Group 7 ===
Pos	Team	Pld	W	D	L	GF	GA	GD	Pts
1	Traktor Kirovohrad	9	7	1	1	27	8	+19	15
2	Budivelnyk Mykolaiv	9	6	2	1	–	–	—	14
3	DO Mykolaiv	0	–	–	–	–	–	—	0
4	Dynamo Voznesensk	0	–	–	–	–	–	—	0
5	Urozhai Kirovohrad	0	–	–	–	–	–	—	0
6	Sudnobudivnyk-2 Mykolaiv	0	–	–	–	–	–	—	0
7	Lokomotyv Znamianka	0	–	–	–	–	–	—	0
8	Shakhtar Oleksandriya	0	–	–	–	–	–	—	0
9	Torpedo Henichesk	9	1	0	8	–	–	—	2
10	Avanhard Kherson	9	0	1	8	–	–	—	1

=== Group 8 ===
Pos	Team	Pld	W	D	L	GF	GA	GD	Pts
1	Dynamo Vinnytsia	0	–	–	–	–	–	—	0
2	DO Zhytomyr	0	–	–	–	–	–	—	0
3	Dynamo Zhytomyr	0	–	–	–	–	–	—	0
4	Dynamo Kamianets-Podilskyi	0	–	–	–	–	–	—	0
5	DO Vinnytsia	0	–	–	–	–	–	—	0
6	Lokomotyv Zhmerynka	0	–	–	–	–	–	—	0
7	Chervonyi Prapor Malyn	0	–	–	–	–	–	—	0
8	Dynamo Proskuriv	0	–	–	–	–	–	—	0
9	Spartak Zhytomyr	0	–	–	–	–	–	—	0
10	Lokomotyv Shepetivka (W)	0	–	–	–	–	–	—	0

(W) Withdrew

=== Group 9 ===
Pos	Team	Pld	W	D	L	GF	GA	GD	Pts
1	Lokomotyv Ternopil	6	6	0	0	19	4	+15	12
2	Dynamo Lutsk	6	2	2	2	–	–	—	6
3	Lokomotyv Rivne	6	2	2	2	–	–	—	6
4	Bilshovyk Vynnyky	6	2	2	2	–	–	—	6
5	Dynamo Stanislav	6	2	1	3	–	–	—	5
6	Bilshovyk Zdolbuniv	6	1	1	4	–	–	—	3
7	Bilshovyk Zolochiv	6	0	2	4	–	–	—	2
8	Dynamo Lviv (W)	0	–	–	–	–	–	—	0

(W) Withdrew

=== Group 10 ===
Pos	Team	Pld	W	D	L	GF	GA	GD	Pts
1	Spartak Stanislav	8	6	1	1	23	4	+19	13
2	Naftovyk Stryi	8	5	1	2	–	–	—	11
3	Naftovyk Boryslav	8	5	1	2	–	–	—	11
4	Dynamo Mukacheve	8	3	4	1	19	11	+8	10
5	Bilshovyk Berehove	0	–	–	–	–	–	—	0
6	Dynamo Uzhhorod	8	3	2	3	–	–	—	8
7	Bilshovyk Sambir	8	2	2	4	–	–	—	6
8	Dynamo Drohobych	8	1	0	7	–	–	—	2
9	Lokomotyv Chernivtsi	8	1	0	7	–	–	—	2
10	Spartak Chernivtsi (W)	0	–	–	–	–	–	—	0

(W) Withdrew

== Final stage ==
=== Group 1 ===
Pos	Team	Pld	W	D	L	GF	GA	GD	Pts	Qualification
1	FC Metalurh Dniprodzerzhynsk	4	3	0	1	7	2	+5	6	Championship final
2	FC Metalurh Kostiantynivka	4	3	0	1	0	0	0	6	
3	FC Traktor Kirovohrad	4	2	1	1	0	0	0	5	
4	FC Metalurh Voroshylovsk	4	1	1	2	0	0	0	3	
5	FC Spartak Poltava	4	0	0	4	0	0	0	0	

=== Group 2 ===
Pos	Team	Pld	W	D	L	GF	GA	GD	Pts	Qualification
1	DO Kyiv	3	2	1	0	4	1	+3	5	Championship final
2	FC Spartak Stanislav	3	1	2	0	2	1	+1	4	
3	FC Lokomotyv Ternopil	3	1	1	1	8	5	+3	3	
4	FC Dynamo Vinnytsia	3	0	0	3	4	11	−7	0	
5	FC Vodnyk Odesa (W)	1	0	0	1	1	4	−3	0	Withdrew

(W) Withdrew

== Championship final ==
- FC Metalurh Dniprodzerzhynsk – DO Kyiv 0:5

== Ukrainian clubs at the All-Union level ==
- First Group (3): Dynamo Kyiv, Lokomotyv Kharkiv, Shakhtar Stalino
- Second Group (18): Kharchovyk Odesa, Metalurh (Stal) Dnipropetrovsk, Sudnobudivnyk Mykolaiv, DO Kyiv, Spartak Lviv, Spartak Kherson, Spartak Uzhhorod, Dzerzhynets Kharkiv, Dynamo Voroshylovhrad, Lokomotyv Zaporizhia, Avanhard Kramatorsk, Shakhtar Kadiivka, Bilshovyk Mukachevo, Spartak Kyiv, Torpedo Kharkiv, Dynamo Chernivtsi, Trudovi Rezervy Voroshylovhrad, DO Lviv

== Number of teams by region ==
Number	Region	Team(s)	
Number	Region	Ukrainian SSR	All-Union
10 (2)	Donetsk Oblast	Metalurh Kostiantynivka, Metalurh Zhdanov, Metalurh Yenakieve, Lokomotyv Yasynuvata, Lokomotyv Artemivsk, Avanhard Kramatorsk (klubnaya), Shakhtar Horlivka, Metalurh Makiivka, Shakhtar Smolianka, Shakhtar Druzhkivka	Stakhanovets Stalino, Avanhard Kramatorsk
7 (3)	Kyiv Oblast	DO Kyiv (klubnaya), DO Cherkasy, Mashynobudivnyk Kyiv, Mashynobudivnyk Smila, Chervonyi Prapor Kyiv, Mashynobudivnyk Fastiv, Urozhai Boryspil	Dynamo Kyiv, ODO Kyiv, Spartak Kyiv
7 (1)	Dnipropetrovsk Oblast	Metalurh Dniprodzerzhynsk, Metalurh Kryvyi Rih, Dynamo Dnipropetrovsk, Khimik Pavlohrad, Metalurh Nikopol, Metalurh Novomoskovsk, Lokomotyv Dnipropetrovsk	Metalurh Dnipropetrovsk
5 (1)	Odesa Oblast	Vodnyk Odesa, Torpedo Odesa, Dynamo Odesa, Lokomotyv Kotovsk, Lokomotyv Rozdilna	Kharchovyk Odesa
5 (0)	Kirovohrad Oblast	Lokomotyv Haivoron, Traktor Kirovohrad, Urozhai Kirovohrad, Lokomotyv Znamianka, Shakhtar Oleksandriya	–
4 (3)	Kharkiv Oblast	Chervonyi Prapor Kharkiv, Lokomotyv Kupiansk, Lokomotyv Izyum, Spartak Kupiansk	Dzerzhynets Kharkiv, Lokomotyv Kharkiv, Torpedo Kharkiv
4 (1)	Zaporizhia Oblast	Trudovi Rezervy Melitopol, Traktor Osypenko, Sudnobudivnyk Velykyi Tokmak, Enerhiya Zaporizhia	Lokomotyv Zaporizhia
4 (1)	Mykolaiv Oblast	Budivelnyk Mykolaiv, DO Mykolaiv, Dynamo Voznesensk, Sudnobudivnyk-2 Mykolaiv	Sudnobudivnyk Mykolaiv
4 (0)	Zhytomyr Oblast	DO Zhytomyr, Dynamo Zhytomyr, Chervonyi Prapor Malyn, Spartak Zhytomyr	–
4 (0)	Sumy Oblast	Mashynobudivnyk Sumy, Lokomotyv Konotop, Khimik Shostka, Spartak Sumy	–
4 (0)	(Soviet Union) Drohobych Oblast	Naftovyk Stryi, Naftovyk Boryslav, Bilshovyk Sambir, Dynamo Drohobych	–
3 (3)	Luhansk Oblast	Metalurh Voroshylovsk, Khimik Verkhniy, Khimik Rubizhne	Dynamo Voroshylovhrad, Shakhtar Kadiivka, Trudovi Rezervy Voroshylovhrad
3 (2)	Zakarpattia Oblast	Dynamo Mukachevo, Bilshovyk Berehove, Dynamo Uzhhorod	Spartak Uzhhorod, Bilshovyk Mukachevo
3 (2)	Lviv Oblast	Bilshovyk Vynnyky, Bilshovyk Zolochiv, Dynamo Lviv	Spartak Lviv, DO Lviv
3 (0)	Poltava Oblast	Spartak Poltava, Lokomotyv Poltava, Dzerzhynets Kremenchuk	–
3 (0)	Khmelnytskyi Oblast	Dynamo Kamianets-Podilskyi, Dynamo Proskuriv, Lokomotyv Shepetivka	–
3 (0)	Vinnytsia Oblast	Dynamo Vinnytsia, DO Vinnytsia, Lokomotyv Zhmerynka	–
2 (1)	Kherson Oblast	Torpedo Henichesk, Avanhard Kherson	Spartak Kherson
2 (1)	Chernivtsi Oblast	Lokomotyv Chernivtsi, Spartak Chernivtsi	Dynamo Chernivtsi
2 (0)	Ivano-Frankivsk Oblast	Dynamo Stanislav, Spartak Stanislav	–
2 (0)	Chernihiv Oblast	Mashynobudivnyk Pryluky, Spartak Chernihiv	–
2 (0)	Rivne Oblast	Lokomotyv Rine, Bilshovyk Zdolbuniv	–
2 (0)	(Soviet Union) Izmail Oblast	Spartak Izmail, DO Izmail	–
1 (0)	Ternopil Oblast	Lokomotyv Ternopil	–
1 (0)	Volyn Oblast	Dynamo Lutsk	–
