= Zirka =

Zirka Зирка
- Village
- Location within Bashkortostan Location within Russia
- Coordinates: 56°12′N 55°17′E
- Country: Russia
- Region: Bashkortostan
- District: Yanaulsky District
- Time zone: UTC+5:00

Zirka (Russian: Зирка; Bashkir: Зеркә, Zerkä) is a rural locality (a village) in Maximovsky Selsoviet, Yanaulsky District, Bashkortostan, Russia. The population was 18 as of 2010. There is 1 street.

== Geography ==
Zirka is located 41 km southeast of Yanaul (the district's administrative centre) by road. Sibady is the nearest rural locality.
