= FC Spartak Poltava =

Defunct professional football club based in Poltava, Ukraine

Spartak Poltava
- Founded: 1923
- Dissolved: 1980s
- Ground: Poltava

Football Club Spartak Poltava (Ukrainian: ФК Спартак Полтава); was a Ukrainian Soviet football team based in Poltava, Ukraine. It was one of the best teams in Poltava during the 1940-1950.

== History ==
In 1922 a sport organization Spartak was created. Next year a football team was organized. They began a rivalry with another city sport organization Sokil. Within a year Sokil was dissolved and its football club a four time city champion was dissolved also. Spartak reinforced with best city players easily won the 1924 and 1925 city championships. In early 1926 football club was transferred to District Council of Trade Unions and was renamed united team of Trade Unions. In 1936 club received its former name Spartak. A year later they finished third in city summer championship and won the fall championship of second teams in Class A. They took part in 1939 Football Championship of the Ukrainian SSR where they were promoted from third group. In 1940 Football Championship of the Ukrainian SSR they finished last in second group. In Oblast cup final, Spartak faced Dynamo Kremenchuk. Match ended in a nil-nil draw, and in a replay three days later Spartak scored six goals to win its first major trophy. They won the city championship and city cup. After Poltava was liberated on 23 September 1943, Spartak resumed football activities. In fall of 1944 Spartak won the city championship. During 1945 Spartak won the city cup and championship. In 1946 they won the fall Cup and won the championship. They also took part in 1946 Football Championship of the Ukrainian SSR and 1946 Cup of the Ukrainian SSR. They also won the city championship. At the end of the year many top players left the club to join Dynamo Poltava. During 1948 championship Spartak finished third, won the city cup and took part in 1948 Football Championship of the Ukrainian SSR. Next year Spartak finished second in championship, won the cup and city cup. They also participated in 1949 Football Championship of the Ukrainian SSR. In 1950 they finished second in the championship. In the cup they lost to Lokomotyv Poltava and in city cup they lost to Dynamo. During 1951 Spartak won the championship and came second in city championship. After 1951 win, Spartak chose to stop taking part in the championship and cup, only participating in city championship and cup and in Spartak sports society competitions. The club also became a hockey team during winter time. In the mid 1980s club seized to exist. In 1987 Spartak sports society seized to exist also.

== Name change ==
- Spartak Poltava (1923–1926)
- united team of Trade Union (1926–1936)
- Spartak Poltava (1936–1980s)

== Honours ==
Ukrainian Spartak sports society Cup

Runners-up (1): 1949

Football Championship of the Ukrainian SSR Group 3

Winners (1): 1939

Football Championship of the Ukrainian SSR Group 2

Winners (1): 1949

Poltava Oblast Championship

Winners (2): 1946, 1951,
Runners-up (2): 1949, 1950
Third place (1): 1948

Poltava Oblast Cup

Winners (3): 1940, 1946 (Fall), 1949
Runners-up (1): 1950

Poltava Championship

Winners (4): 1940, 1944, 1945, 1946,
Runners-up (1): 1951,
Third place (2): 1937 (Summer), 1953

Poltava Cup

Winners (5): 1940, 1945, 1948, 1949, 1951,
Runners-up (4): 1950, 1958, 1959, 1961,

== Sources ==
- Lomov, Anatolii; Stadnychenko, Oleksandr (2009), 100 Років Полтавському Футболу [100 Years of Poltava Football] (in Ukrainian), Poltava: Poltava, ISBN 978-966-97035-0-7
- Lomov, Anatolii; Kryvorotko, Serhii (2010), Энциклопедия Полтавского Футбола (1909-2010) [Encyclopedia of Poltava Football (1909-2010)] (in Russian), Poltava: OOO "ASMI", ISBN 978-966-182-118-6
- Lomov, Anatolii (2019), Полтавщина спортивна в обличчях і фактах. [Sport in Poltava region in faces and facts.] (in Ukrainian), Poltava: PP Dyvosvit, ISBN 978-617-633-252-7
