= FC Suputnyk Poltava =

Defunct football club based in Poltava, Ukraine

Suputnyk Poltava
- Founded: 1961
- Dissolved: 1992
- Ground: Poltava

Football Club Suputnyk Poltava (Ukrainian: ФК Супутник Полтава); was a Ukrainian Soviet football team based in Poltava, Ukraine.

== History ==
Football club was formed in Poltava in beginning of 1961 at the Electrotechnical Plant No 20. Marlen Liaskovets, one of the shop managers was the driving force behind the clubs creation. Club was named Avanhard and Ler Hedevanishvili was asked to be manager. Club played its first official match away against Avanhard Karlivka on 25 June 1961. Match ended in a 4–2 loss. Club finished the season forth. They won the oblast Avanhard sports society competition. At the end of the season club changed name to Suputnyk. In February 1962 club took part in cup of Poltava Oblast committee of Komsomol held in Kremenchuk. They finished third. They won city championship. Taking part in Avanhard sport society competition, Suputnyk was one of three clubs to advance to oblast championship. In their group of three teams all clubs had same points and goal difference. Moving on to second stage, the club finished second. Club had V. Kurchenko and Valentyn Shliakhovyi selected as best goalkeeper and best defender of the championship. During 1963 season they finished second in their zone and fifth in the final part. The club won Avanhard sport society competition and city cup. During next season Suputnyk finished second. In 1965, the club finished second. In 1966, the club won city cup and oblast cup against Avanhard Kremenchuk. This allowed Suputnyk to take part in 1966 Football Cup of Ukrainian SSR among KFK where they lost in 2–0 in the final. This achievement allowed them to take part in Soviet Amateur Cup. In the final part of competition, Suputnyk finished last in group of four teams. They won their first oblast championship. Next year they won the championship again. They reached the cup final where they lost to Avanhard Kremenchuk. They also won the city double. During 1968 season, Suputnyk only lost one match and drew once in the championship, winning it for the third time. They reached the cup final again where first match ended in a draw. During a rematch held next day, the club lost by one goal. In the city championship both Suputnyk and Zirka Poltava both finished level on points. A golden match to determine the winner was held. It ended 1–1 and match went to penalty kicks. Zirka converted six while Suputnyk only managed four. In city cup final the club faced Zirka again. Match went into extra time and Suputnyk won the cup. In 1969 Suputnyk became the first team to win four consecutive titles. They also won the city cup. Next season they finished forth after losing the deciding match against Zirka. During 1971 the club finished second. The also won city championship. Next season Suputnyk had an unbeaten second part of season. Deciding match Avanhard Kremenchuk finished in a 3–0 win for Suputnyk, giving them their fifth title. They were victorious against Avanhard again in the cup final. They also won the city championship. During 1973 the club finished second. In the 1974 championship the club finished first, one point ahead of both teams below them. Suputnyk lost 4–0 in the cup final to Lokomotyv. They won the city championship. In 1975 for the first time, Suputnyk finished third. In oblast and city cup finals the club faced Promin Poltava. They won oblast cup and lost in city cup final. During next season the club finished fifth and won both cups. They also won the Poltava oblast sport societies competition. In the 1977 season, Suputnyk won the championship. Next year they won city cup. For next two years club did not take part in top group of the championship and had no city success. During 1981 the club returned to championship and won. They also won the cup and lost in final of city cup. For the next four years club only took part in city competitions. In 1986 the club returned to championship and finished seventh. For the next six years they again only took part in city competitions. After the end of 1992 season the club was disbanded.

== Name change ==
- Avanhard Poltava (1961)
- Suputnyk Poltava (1961–1992)

== Managers ==
- Ler Hedevanishvili (1961–1968)
- Anatlii Kachuiev
- Kostiantyn Maltsev
- Anatolii Bohdanovych
- Valerii Smolin (1979–1980)

== Honours ==
Football Cup of the Ukrainian SSR

Runners-up (1): 1966

Poltava Oblast Championship

Winners (8): 1966, 1967, 1968, 1969, 1972, 1974, 1977, 1981
Runners-up (5): 1962, 1964, 1965, 1971, 1973,
Third place (1): 1975,

Poltava Oblast Cup

Winners (5): 1966, 1972, 1975, 1976, 1981
Runners-up (3): 1967, 1968, 1974

Poltava Championship

Winners (5): 1962, 1967, 1971, 1972, 1974
Runners-up (1): 1968

Poltava Cup

Winners (7): 1963, 1966, 1967, 1968, 1969, 1976, 1978
Runners-up (2): 1975, 1981

== Sources ==
- Pyrukhin, Yurii, Энциклопедия кременчугского футбола [Encyclopedia of Kremenchuk football] (in Russian), Kremenchuk
- Lomov, Anatolii; Stadnychenko, Oleksandr (2009), 100 Років Полтавському Футболу [100 Years of Poltava Football] (in Ukrainian), Poltava: Poltava, ISBN 978-966-97035-0-7
- Lomov, Anatolii; Kryvorotko, Serhii (2010), Энциклопеди Полтавского Футбола (1909-2010) [Encyclopedia of Poltava Football (1909-2010)] (in Russian), Poltava: OOO "ASMI", ISBN 978-966-182-118-6
- Lomov, Anatolii; Kryvyi, Anatolii (2013), Полтава футбольная от А до Я ( 1909 - 2013) [Poltava football club from A to Z (1909 - 2013)] (in Russian), Poltava: PP Dyvosvit, ISBN 978-617-633-067-7
- Klykovskyi, Serhii (2010), Лубенському футболу 90 років [90 Years of Football in Lubny] (in Ukrainian), Lubny
