= FC Zirka Lubny =

Defunct football club based in Lubny, Ukraine

Zirka Lubny
- Founded: 1924
- Dissolved: 1986
- Ground: Kosteniuk Stadium
- Capacity: 50
Home colours	Away colours

Football Club Zirka Lubny (Ukrainian: ФК Зірка Лубни); was a Ukrainian Soviet football team based in Lubny, Ukraine.

== History ==
In 1924 soldiers from the Lubny army camp established a club named Chervonoarmiiets. Club participated at city level until German invasion in 1941. Club represented Lubny army garrison in 1924–1926, from 1937 to 1969 various formations stationed in Lubny. After the war club was part of House of Military Officers and in addition to city competitions they took part in cup of Kyiv Military District where they lost in the 1958 final. Club also finished second in that years city championship. They finished second in the city championship. In 1959 club won the city double, won three other competitions organized by political entities. This achievement allowed them to play in qualifiers for 1959 Football Championship of the Ukrainian SSR from Poltava oblast. Club was not successful losing all six matches. During the next decade the club won city championship twice in 1963 and 1964. They also won the city cup in 1960 and 1965. After Shafir and Hruzman stopped playing for the club at the end of 1960s, club did not have any notable success over the next decade. Club continued to play in city and Military District competitions. In 1981 Major M. Chernenko became chief of physical training. He enlisted help of officers Pavlo Tretiak and Yurii Sher to reorganize and revive the club. Name Zirka was chosen to signify its allegiance to the Army. With help from Kolos regional sport society the club was allowed to take part in 1982 oblast championship.From 1982 to 1986 club was part of the sports company of 25th Guards Rifle Division. Club easily won their zone and moved on to the final part of competition. Zirka competed to the end losing to eventual winners Kooperator by three points. During March 1983 club received players who began military service from relegated Kolos Poltava. During the season the club won their zone again and won the gold medals after winning the final part. They also won the city cup in 1983 and 1984. During 1984 many of the club leaders left after fulfilling their military obligations. Club did not advance out of their zone. In spring of 1985 a new club was formed from many of the clubs better players, Sula Lubny. Zirka continued playing until end of 1986 when the club was dissolved.

Club played it's matches at Torpedo Stadium and from 1982 to 1986 at Kosteniuk Stadium.

== Name change ==
- Chervonoarmiiets Lubny (1924–1941)
- Lubny House of Officers (1950–1960)
- Chapaievets Lubny (1961–1969)
- Zirka Lubny (1982–1986)

== Honours ==
Poltava Oblast Championship

Winners (1): 1983
Runners-up (1): 1982

Lubny Championship

Winners (3): 1959, 1963, 1964
Runners-up (1): 1958

Lubny Cup

Winners (5): 1959, 1960, 1965, 1983, 1984

== Managers ==
- Maks Shafir (1960–1966)
- Mykhailo Hruzman
- Yurii Sher (1982–1986)

== Sources ==
- Lomov, Anatolii; Stadnychenko, Oleksandr (2009), 100 Років Полтавському Футболу [100 Years of Poltava Football] (in Ukrainian), Poltava: Poltava, ISBN 978-966-97035-0-7
- Lomov, Anatolii; Kryvorotko, Serhii (2010), Энциклопеди Полтавского Футбола (1909-2010) [Encyclopedia of Poltava Football (1909-2010)] (in Russian), Poltava: OOO "ASMI", ISBN 978-966-182-118-6
- Klykovskyi, Serhii (2010), Лубенському футболу 90 років [90 Years of Football in Lubny] (in Ukrainian), Lubny
- Pyrukhin, Yurii, Энциклопедия кременчугского футбола [Encyclopedia of Kremenchuk football] (in Russian), Kremenchuk
