= FC Kramatorsk =

Association football club in Kramatorsk, Ukraine

Kramatorsk
- Full name: Football Club Kramatorsk
- Founded: 1955; 71 years ago
- Dissolved: 2022
- Ground: Prapor Stadium, Kramatorsk
- Capacity: 6,000
- 2020–21: First League, 12th
Home colours	Away colours

Former crest

Football Club Kramatorsk (Ukrainian: Футбольний клуб Краматорськ; Russian: Футбольный клуб Краматорск) is a professional Ukrainian football club from the city of Kramatorsk in Donetsk Oblast.

The club takes its history from a factory team of the Old Kramatorsk Machine-building Plant (SKMZ).

== History ==
The club Avangard was reformed in 1955. Prior to World War II there existed a club that was associated with the machine industry in the city. In 1937, the club participated in the national championship as the champion of Ukraine. In 1939, the team won the Cup of Soviet Ukraine.

The team in 1936 won 1st place in Ukraine among working teams and in 1937, 1938 and 1961 reached the 1/16 finals of the Soviet Cup, and 1/8 finals of the Soviet Cup in 1939.

The club regularly participated in the Soviet championship (1946, 1948, 1949, 1960–1970) and the USSR Cup (1937–1939, 1949, 1961-1966/1967).

In the 1998–1999 season, the city of Kramatorsk was presented by a team of the Armed Forces of Ukraine, VPS Kramatorsk (Air Force), in the Ukrainian Second League. That team was penalized 6 points for failure to pay the licence fees to the PFL and was removed from the competition after the first round. During that period the actual factory team was called Bliuminh Kramatorsk and played in championship of Donetsk Oblast.

The team's revival brought back success as they became Donetsk oblast champions in 2010. In 2011, the club appointed head coach Serhiy Shevchenko in preparation for returning to the Second League.

The club submitted a license to the Professional Football League of Ukraine and was accepted into the Ukrainian Second League for the 2011–12 season.

During the 2014–15 season, the club was suspended from the Professional Football League of Ukraine as it ended up in the "ATO zone". Earlier that year in spring due Russian aggression against Ukraine, the Russian Federation occupied the Ukrainian Autonomous Republic of Crimea.

On 7 October 2014, a former press-attache claimed that supporters of the Donetsk People's Republic killed 16-year-old goalkeeper Stepan Chubenko. Chubenko was killed on 25 July 2014 in Horbachevo-Mykhailivka, two days after he was kidnapped at the Donetsk Railway Station.

Near the end of the 2020–21 season the team name was changed from Avanhard Kramatorsk to FC Kramatorsk.

== Honors ==
- Championship of the Ukrainian SSR

1936 (as Ordzhonikidze Factory)

- Cup of the Ukrainian SSR

1939

- Donetsk Oblast Champions

1947, 1996, 2010

- Fair Play award

Winners (1) Fair Play award of Ukrainian First League: 2019–20

== Sponsorships ==
Lotto Sport Italia

== Leadership ==
=== Presidents ===
- 2005 – 2008 Serhiy Karakuts
- 2010 – 2017 Oleksandr Bolshakov
- 2010 - Maksim Yefimov (honorary president)
- 2021 – Karen Zargarian (head)

=== Directors ===
- 2011 Vladyslav Dolhopolov (sports)
- ???? – 2017 Roman Bolshakov (general)
- 2017 – 2021 Andriy Bezsonnyi
- 2021 – Yevhen Shvets

== League and cup history ==
=== Soviet period ===
Season	Div.	Pos.	Pl.	W	D	L	GS	GA	P	Domestic Cup	Other		Notes
1936	4th (Republican championship)	1	4	4	0	0	10	2	12				
1937	4th (Republican championship)	4	6	2	2	2	9	6	12	1/4 finals	SC	1/16 finals	
1938	4th (Republican championship)	6	11	5	1	5	18	20	22	1/8 finals	SC	1/16 finals	
1939	4th (Republican championship)	5	9	4	1	4	16	15	18	Winner	SC	1/8 finals	
1940	4th (Republican championship)	2	?	?	?	?	?	?	?	Round 3			
1941–1945	World War II, club was dissolved												
1945	unknown									1/16 finals			
1946	4th (Republican championship)	5	Group stage (Group East)							Round 3			
1947	4th (Republican championship)	1	Group stage (Group 6)							1/2 finals			
1947	4th (Republican championship)	2	5	3	1	1	14	7	7	1/2 finals			
1948	4th (Republican championship)	9	Group stage (Group 5)							Round 2			
1949	4th (Republican championship)	6	Group stage (Group 5)										
1950	4th (Republican championship)	5	Group stage (Group 3)										
1951	4th (Republican championship)	5	Group stage (Group 3)										
1952	4th (Republican championship)	7	22	7	8	7	36	29	22				Group 2
1948	2nd (Second Group)	6	14	3	4	7	23	40	10				Group Ukraine, A
1949	2nd (Second Group)	11	34	12	6	16	51	70	30				Group Ukraine
1953–1955	Unknown status												
1956	4th (Republican championship)	7	14	4	1	9	26	28	9	1/16 finals			Group 4
1957	4th (Republican championship)	5	10	3	1	6	9	24	7	1/4 finals			Group 5
1958	4th (Republican championship)	2	14	8	2	4	24	15	18				Group 8
1958	4th (Republican championship)	4	5	1	3	1	3	5	5				Group 2
1959	4th (Republican championship)	8	14	2	3	9	16	31	7				Group 3 Admitted to masters
1960	2nd (Class B, Ukraine)	7	36	13	12	11	41	35	38				Group 2
1961	2nd (Class B, Ukraine)	17	36	10	8	18	30	47	28		R.P/O	winner	Group 2
1962	2nd (Class B, Ukraine)	13	24	5	5	14	28	47	15				Group 3
1962	2nd (Class B, Ukraine)	30	10	6	2	2	20	12	14				Places 29–39 Relegated
1963	3rd (Class B, Ukraine)	16	38	11	11	16	34	44	33		R.P/O	loser	Group 2
1964	3rd (Class B, Ukraine)	10	30	8	11	11	27	32	27				Group 3
1964	3rd (Class B, Ukraine)	26	10	5	2	3	17	12	12				Places 25–30
1965	3rd (Class B, Ukraine)	17	32	7	6	19	23	52	20				Group 3
1965	3rd (Class B, Ukraine)	44	4	2	1	1	3	2	5				Places 43–45
1966	3rd (Class B, Ukraine)	9	38	16	8	14	49	49	40		P/O	winner	Group 1
1967	3rd (Class B, Ukraine)	16	40	10	14	16	46	52	34				Group 2
1968	3rd (Class B, Ukraine)	10	40	13	13	14	43	43	39				Group 2
1969	3rd (Class B, Ukraine)	11	40	12	16	12	31	30	40				Group 2 Relegated
1970	4th (Class B, Ukraine)	5	26	10	7	9	32	34	27				Group 2
1970	4th (Class B, Ukraine)	12	40	13	11	16	43	54	37				Places 1–14 Tier liquidated
1971–1973	Unknown status												
1974	4th (KFK championship)	1	14	8	5	1	28	12	21				Group 5
1974	4th (KFK championship)	6	5	0	1	4	3	12	1				Final Group
1975	4th (KFK championship)	3	14	7	4	3	24	19	18				Group 6
1976	4th (KFK championship)	10	18	2	3	13	9	34	7	1/8 finals			Group 5

=== Ukraine ===
Season	Div.	Pos.	Pl.	W	D	L	GS	GA	P	Domestic Cup	Europe	Notes
1992–93	4th (KFK championship)	12	26	7	3	16	23	57	17			
1993–94	4th (KFK championship)	8	26	10	4	12	45	42	24			
1994–95	4th (KFK championship)	14	30	7	3	20	16	30	24			
1995–96	4th (KFK championship)	1	4	2	2	0	8	2	8			
1996–2010	Club idle											
2011	4th (Championship among amateurs)	1	8	6	1	1	15	4	19			Promoted
2011–12	3rd "B" (Second League)	2	26	19	1	6	41	15	58	1/64 finals		Promoted
2012–13	2nd (First League)	7	34	15	8	11	37	26	53	1/8 finals		
2013–14	2nd (First League)	15	30	7	10	13	23	27	31	1/8 finals		
2014–15	Club suspended operation due to the Russian military intervention in Ukraine											
2015–16	2nd (First League)	13	30	8	8	14	28	42	32	1/16 finals		
2016–17	2nd (First League)	7	34	14	10	10	32	28	52	1/32 finals		
2017–18	2nd (First League)	6	34	15	7	12	44	42	52	1/16 finals		
2018–19	2nd (First League)	5	28	14	6	8	44	26	48	1/32 finals		
2019–20	2nd (First League)	8	30	13	6	11	37	40	45	1/32 finals		
2020–21	2nd (First League)	12	30	9	5	16	32	51	32	1/64 finals		

== Managers ==
- 2011–2013: (Kyrgyzstan) Sergei Shevchenko
- 2013–2016: (Ukraine) Yakiv Kripak
- 2016–2020: (Ukraine) Oleksandr Kosevych
- 2020–2022: (Ukraine) Oleksiy Horodov
