= FC Lokomotyv Poltava =

Defunct football club based in Poltava, Ukraine

Lokomotyv Poltava
- Founded: 30 July 1912
- Dissolved: 1996
- Ground: Lokomotyv Stadium

Football Club Lokomotyv Poltava (Ukrainian: ФК Локомотив Полтава); was a Ukrainian Soviet football team based in Poltava, Ukraine. It is the Poltava Oblast club with the most titles with nine championships and eleven cup wins.

== History ==
The football club was formed in Poltava in 1912 under the name Podilska Poltava. "Podilska" is an adjective form of Podil, which means a lower neighborhood (community). In 1920, it was renamed, and the club was one of four teams that organized Poltava football league. The new name was Podil Poltava. Two years later, it was renamed to Yuzhraion Poltava (Southern district). Four years later, it was again renamed to Zalizhnychnyk (Zheldor) Poltava (Railroad worker). In 1931 club was renamed Lokomotyv and began representing the steam locomotive repair plant. 1953 was the best year for the club. In 1994, the club was dissolved. A newspaper published by the factory gives the date as 1996.

== Name change ==
- Podilska Poltava (1912–1920)
- Podil Poltava (1920–1922)
- Yuzhraion Poltava (1922–1926)
- Zalizhnychnyk (Zheldor) Poltava (1926–1930)
- Lokomotyv Poltava (1931–1994)

== Honours ==
Cup of the Ukrainian SSR

Runners-up (1): 1953

Poltava Oblast Championship

Winners (9): 1949, 1950, 1953, 1954, 1957, 1958, 1960, 1961, 1980
Runners-up (7): 1956, 1972, 1976, 1977, 1972, 1983, 1986
Third place (5): 1938, 1939, 1940, 1979, 1993

Poltava Oblast Cup

Winners (11): 1950, 1951, 1952, 1953, 1954, 1957, 1958, 1959, 1971, 1973, 1980, 1982
Runners-up (8): 1960, 1961, 1969, 1970, 1976, 1979, 1985

Poltava Championship

Winners (9): 1936, 1937 Fall, 1949, 1953, 1954, 1956 (reserves), 1957, 1960, 1961
Runners-up (1): 1956

Poltava Cup

Winners (11): 1939, 1952, 1957, 1958, 1959, 1971, 1974, 1980, 1981, 1982
Runners-up (3): 1953, 1955, 1961

== Sources ==
- Lomov, Anatolii; Stadnychenko, Oleksandr (2009), 100 Років Полтавському Футболу [100 Years of Poltava Football] (in Ukrainian), Poltava: Poltava, ISBN 978-966-97035-0-7
- Lomov, Anatolii; Kryvorotko, Serhii (2010), Энциклопеди Полтавского Футбола (1909-2010) [Encyclopedia of Poltava Football (1909-2010)] (in Russian), Poltava: OOO "ASMI", ISBN 978-966-182-118-6
