= Dynamo Stadium (Poltava) =

Stadium in Poltava, Ukraine

- Стадіон Динамо
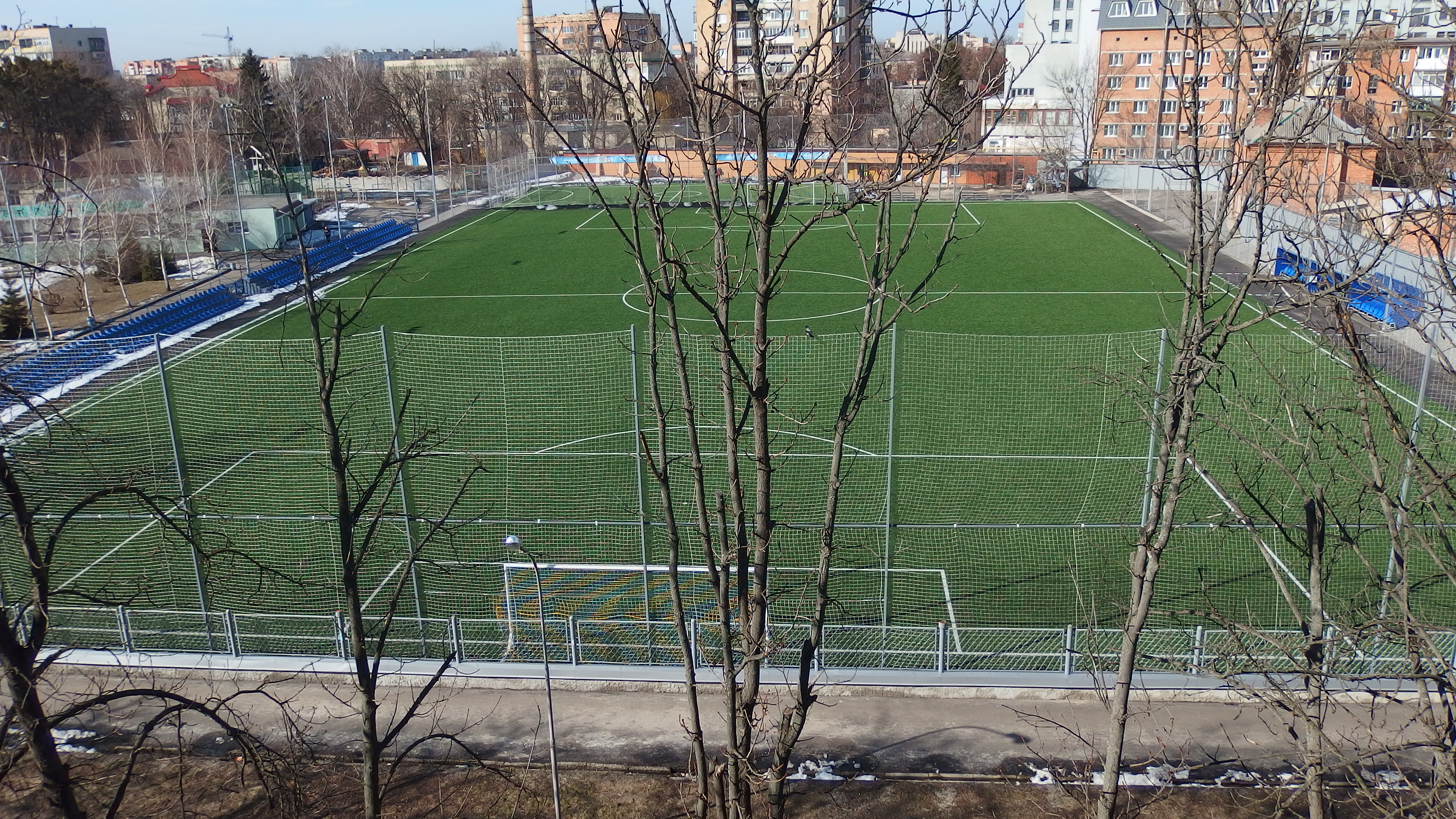
- Interactive map of Dynamo Stadium
- Location: Lidova Street, 4 Poltava, Ukraine
- Coordinates: 49°35′26.5″N 34°32′46.8″E
- Owner: Poltava Dynamo society
- Operator: Poltava Dynamo society
- Capacity: 300
- Surface: Artificial
- Field size: 107 m × 69 m (351 ft × 226 ft)

Construction
- Built: 1938
- Opened: 30 July 1938; 88 years ago
- Renovated: 1944, 2016

Dynamo Stadium (Ukrainian: Стадіон Динамо) is a football stadium in Poltava, Ukraine.

The stadium was built in 1938 and opened on 30 July 1938. The stadium was built on the site of the police sports ground. It was a multi-sport facility located on 1.5 hectares. In 1938, an outdoor shooting range was opened, which remains in use in 2019 after renovations to make an indoor range. During the German occupation, the stadium was used for gardens. After Poltava was liberated, work began to rebuild the stadium and its facilities on 5 May 1944. On 23 July 1944 stadium was reopened after reconstruction. It was officially opened on 2 May 1945.

In 2016 Stadium was renovated. The field, which was 90x50 m, was increased to 107x69 m, and artificial turf was laid. The field was in use 13 to 14 hours each day. Two futsal and two volleyball fields and a track were added. Cost for renovations was ₴ 6,400,000.

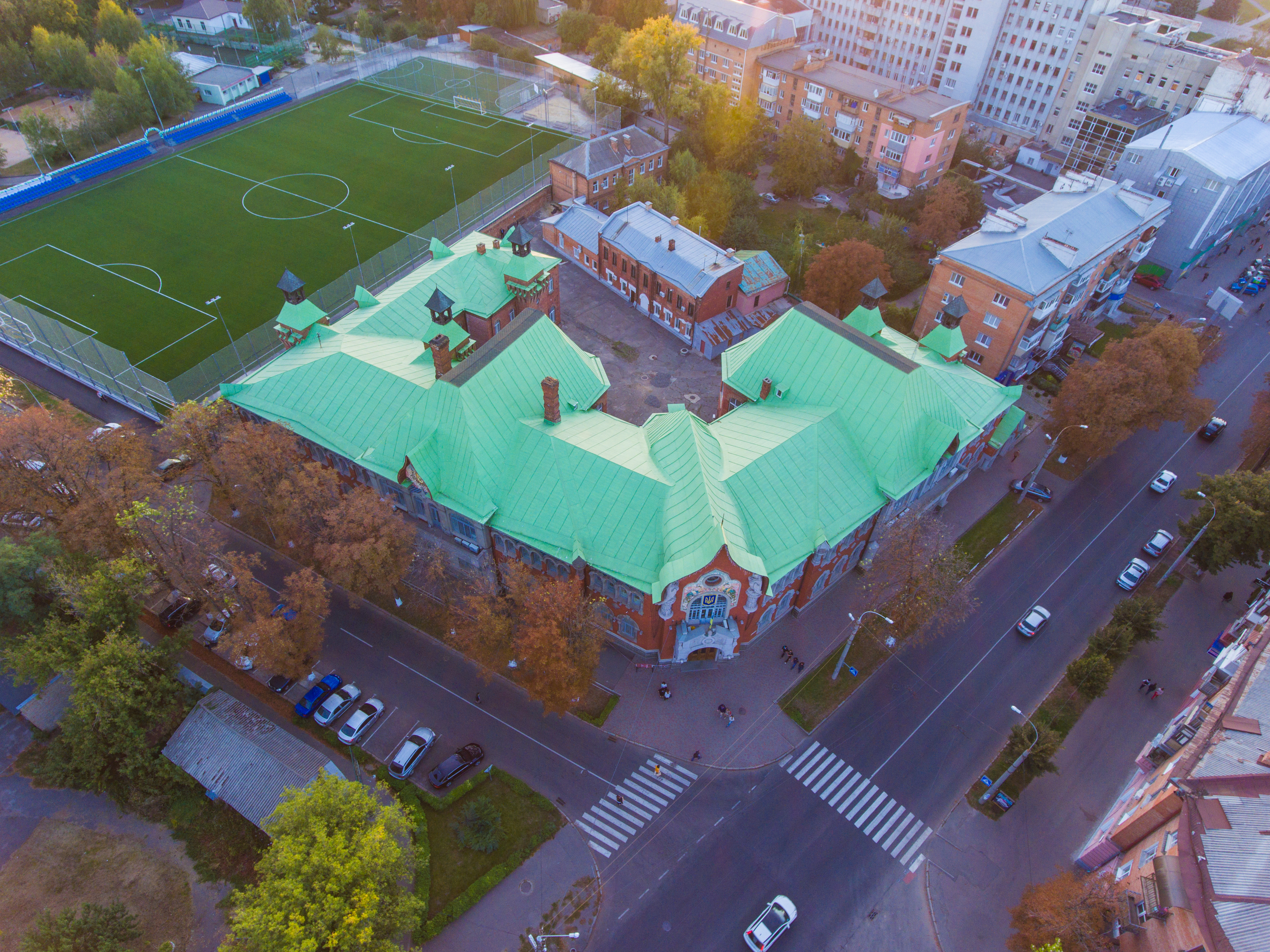
Aerial view of stadium and State Special Communications Service of Ukraine headquarters in Poltava on 19 September 2016.

== Sources ==
- Lomov, Anatolii (2019), Полтавщина спортивна в обличчях і фактах. [Sport in Poltava region in faces and facts.] (in Ukrainian), Poltava: PP Dyvosvit, ISBN 978-617-633-252-7
- Lomov, Anatolii; Stadnychenko, Oleksandr (2009), 100 Років Полтавському Футболу [100 Years of Poltava Football] (in Ukrainian), Poltava: Poltava, ISBN 978-966-97035-0-7
- Lomov, Anatolii; Kryvorotko, Serhii (2010), Энциклопедия Полтавского Футбола (1909-2010) [Encyclopedia of Poltava Football (1909-2010)] (in Russian), Poltava: OOO "ASMI", ISBN 978-966-182-118-6
