= FC Sula Lubny =

FC Sula Lubny is a Ukrainian amateur football club from Lubny, Poltava Oblast.

The club was formed on initiative of the regional branch of the Kolos republican sport society in 1985. The club was formed on basis of existing army football team "Zirka" that was formed earlier in 1982. The club was formed soon after complete reconstruction of the city's central stadium "Kolos" (formerly Metalist). The first head coach was appointed Oleksandr Serdiuk. With exception of 1986, since 1985 the club consistently played in All-Ukrainian football competitions during its Soviet period. Among notable players of the club during that period was Ihor Zhabchenko.

Following independence of Ukraine, the club competed of similar competitions among amateurs. In 1994–95 it was admitted to the newly reformed Third League (formerly Transitional League), but after playing a season it was eliminated to amateurs. In 1995 the club played in regional competitions only until 2001 and then was dissolved. Later in 2003 on basis of Sula in Lubny was created the city's team FC Lubny.

== League and cup history ==
Season	Div.	Pos.	Pl.	W	D	L	GS	GA	P	Domestic Cup	Europe	Notes

== See also ==
- Sula River
