= Lokomotyv Stadium (Poltava) =

Football-only stadium in Poltava, Ukraine

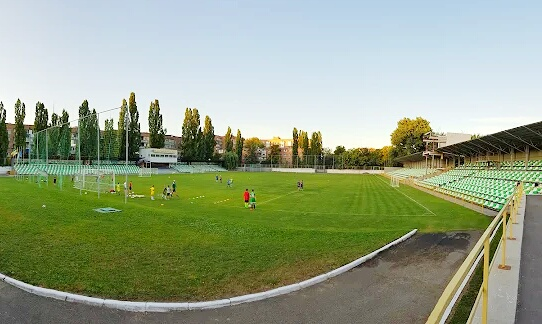
- Interactive map of Lokomotyv Stadium
- Location: Poltava, Ukraine
- Coordinates: 49.582430°N 34.577101°E
- Owner: FC Poltava
- Capacity: 3,700 (football)
- Surface: Grass
- Field size: 105 m × 68 m (115 yd × 74 yd)

Construction
- Built: 1937
- Opened: 30 July 1937
- Renovated: 1945, 1949, 2004, 2008
- Expanded: 2015

Tenant
- FC Poltava

Lokomotyv Stadium is a football-only stadium in Poltava, Ukraine, in Podil (lower city) neighborhood of the city. It is used for football matches, and is the home of FC Poltava. The stadium's official maximum capacity is 3,700.

== History ==
Lokomotyv Stadium was built in Poltava in 1937 by the Soviet Lokomotiv sports society. The opening ceremony was held on 30 June 1937. The first stadium included a football field, running track, and chess and checkers tables. During World War II, the stadium was almost destroyed. It was rebuilt by the summer of 1945, but was rarely used, and the last match was played in August 1947. It was completely renovated by the start of the 1949 season. It belonged to the Poltava Locomotive Repair Factory.

== Reconstruction ==
In 2004, the stadium was renovated. In 2008, the stadium was completely renovated once again with the addition of new plastic seating for 2500 spectators and a commissioned VIP platform for guests of honor. Reconstruction was financed by the club president Leonid Sobolev. The stadium was expanded in 2015. It is a Ukrainian Association of Football Category 2 stadium. This category allow stadium to hold matches in First, Second leagues, and matches of Ukrainian Cup for Round of 32 and Round of 16.

== Gallery ==
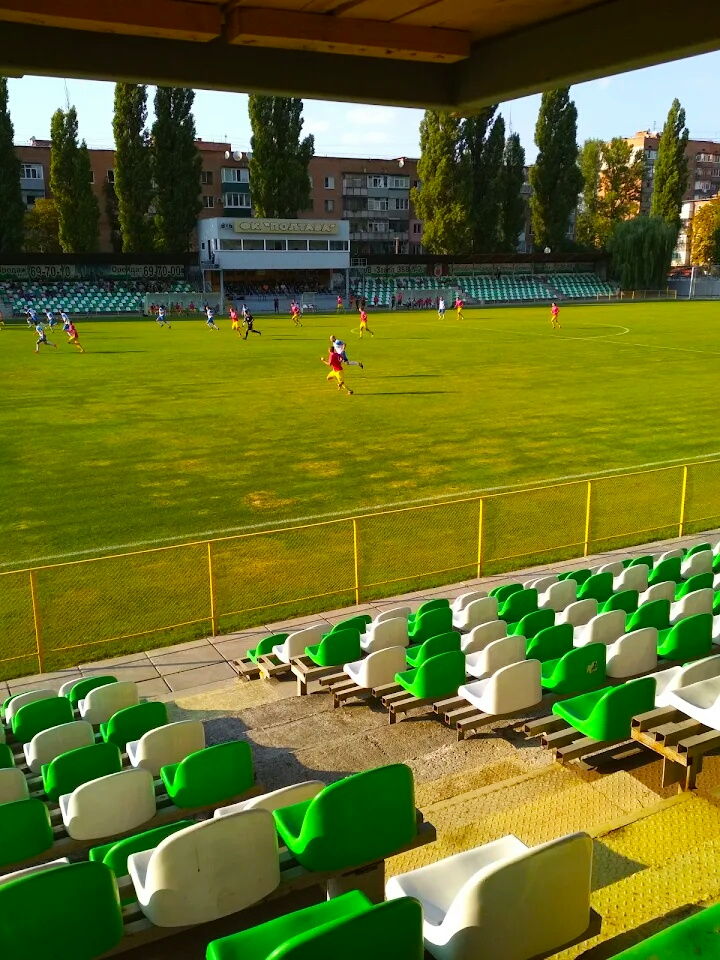

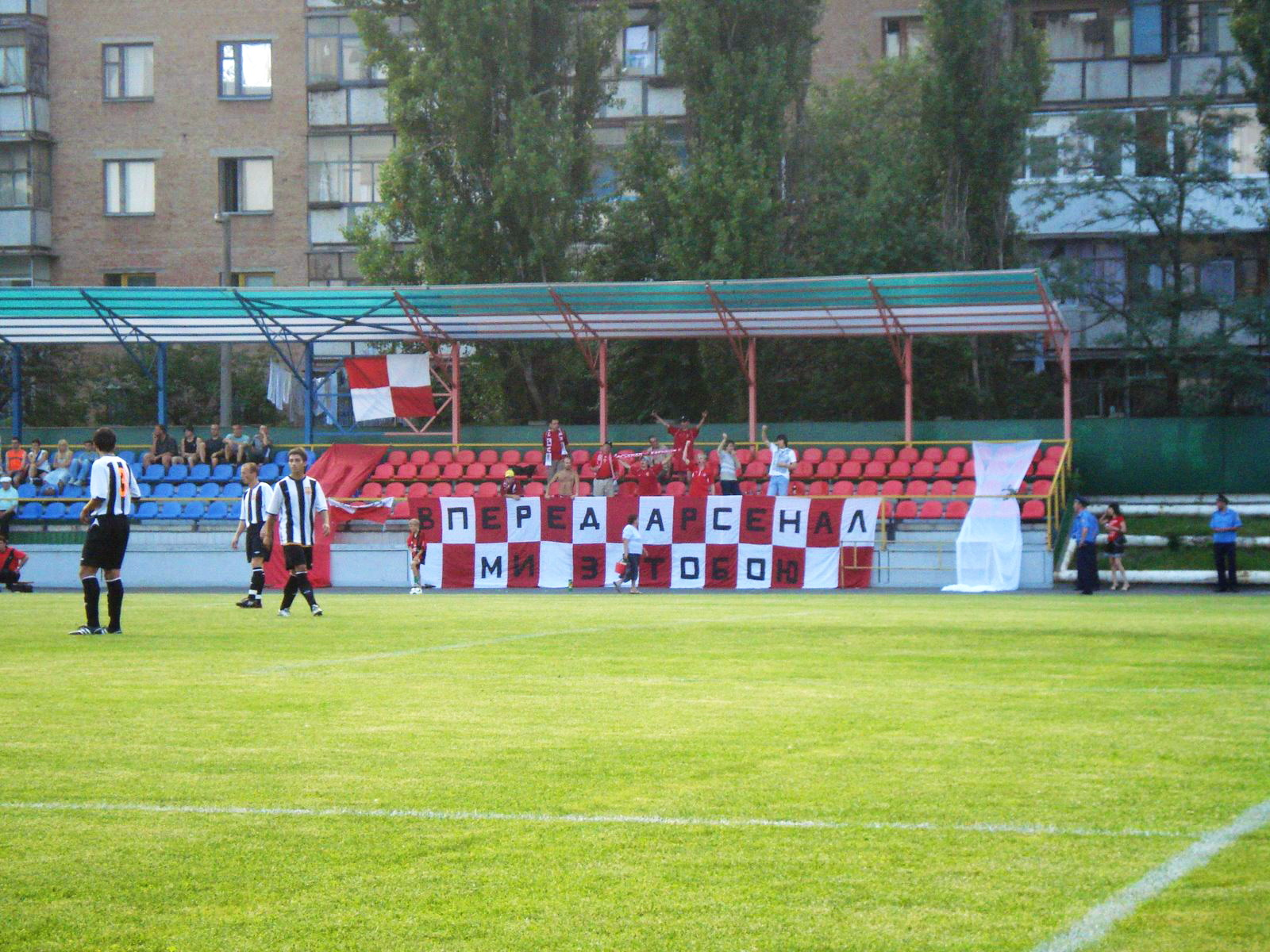

== Sources ==
- Lomov, Anatolii; Kryvorotko, Serhii (2010), Энциклопедия Полтавского Футбола (1909-2010) [Encyclopedia of Poltava Football (1909-2010)] (in Russian), Poltava: OOO "ASMI", ISBN 978-966-182-118-6
