= 1964 FC Dnipro Kremenchuk season =

2nd season in existence of Dnipro Kremenchuk FC

Dnipro
1964 season
- Head coach: Mykola Melnychenko
- Stadium: Dnipro Stadium
- Soviet Second League: 16th Zone 2 (41st combined table)
- Soviet Cup: Ukrainian 2nd Zone 1/8 Final
- Top goalscorer: League: Mykola Prymostka; Viktor Stupak (6 each); All: Viktor Stupak (7)
- Biggest win: 4–2 vs Shakhtar Oleksandria (H), 1 May 1964, Class B 3–1 vs FC Nistrul Bender (H), 4 July 1964, Class B
- Biggest defeat: 0–5 vs SKA Kyiv (H), 1 August 1964, Class B

The 1964 season was Dnipro Kremenchuk's 2nd year in the Ukrainian Class B, a Soviet football competition in the Soviet third tier. In addition to the domestic league, Dnipro also participated in this season's editions of the Soviet Cup and Cup of Central Committee of Leninist Communist League of Youth of Ukraine. Managed by Mykola Melnychenko, they finished forty-first in the combined championship table. They were eliminated from both cups in their first matches. The season covers the period from 1 January 1964 to 31 December 1964.

== Season summary ==
=== Pre-season ===
On 18 January 1964, the Avtobudivnyk newspaper described Sadovskyi and his coaches as holding experiments that negatively impacted most games in 1963 and led to the team finishing in last place. New coaches were hired, and emphasis was made on young prospects. Veterans of the team such as Mykola Prymostka, Hennadii Poryshkin, Viktor Yefimenko and others were retained. With the addition of five Belarusian and three Moldavian clubs to the Ukrainian zone, the league was split into three zones this year. Dnipro was placed in Zone 2 with three teams from the Moldavian SSR. Valerii Lulko was one of the players to join the club, previously having played at Zirka Kirovohrad. Dnipro planned their preseason camp to begin 4 March in Bushtyno, Zakarpattia Oblast. Mykola Melnychenko was revealed as the head coach and the team moved to Berehove to continue their preseason. Hryhorii Miroshnyk, a former manager, joined as an assistant to Melnychenko. Goalkeepers Yurii Semchenko and Serhii Morozov, defenders and forwards: Ihor Burenkov, Vladyslav Soroka, Volodymyr Robarovskyi, Stanislav Yaroshenko and I. Petrov also joined Dnipro. The club set a goal to finish the season mid-table.

=== April ===
Season began with three away games. On 12 April Dnipro played Stroitel Bălți. The match ended in a 2–0 loss. Next week Dnipro lost 3–0 to Nistrul Bender. On the twenty-second Dnipro traveled to Avanhard Chernivtsi. That match was part of the 1964 Soviet Cup. Dnipro started the game strongly, forcing the opposition goalkeeper to make early saves. However, Avanhard players slowly took the initiative and were first to score. By the hour mark they scored two more. Viktor Stupak scored the only goal for the visitors and Dnipro lost 3–1. On the twenty-sixths Dnipro played their first home game against Luchaferul Tiraspol. It was an even game with both teams equally attacking. Visitors were first to score. Prymostka scored with three minutes remaining to draw the game.

=== May ===
On 2 May Dnipro hosted Budivelnyk Kherson. Visiting team was more persistent and scored the only goal of the game. Four days later Dnipro hosted Shakhtar Oleksandriia. The game started with Dnipro pleasing their players with quick tempo and good tactics. Playing with two strikers paid off, as visiting defenders were always under pressure. Three minutes after the start forced visitors to concede a corner, through which Viktor Stupak scored. In the fourteenth minute he had an assist as Prymostka scored. Eight minutes later Prymostka added another goal. Right before the end of the first half, the visitors managed to pull back one goal. In the second half Prymoska scored again. As the visitor already lost the game, they began attacking more and scored another goal. Shakhtar was not happy with the refereeing and filed a protest. Four days later Dnipro traveled to play Dunayets Izmail. They could not score and lost 1–0. On 16 May Dnipro was in Kyiv to play SKA Kyiv. Both teams started the game with attacks. In the second half SKA replaced their forwards and this brought the desired results. Bazhenov scored in the seventieth minute. Dnipro players kept attacking and succeeded through Prymostka ten minutes later. With one minute remaining Dnipro goalkeeper Semchenko dropped the ball and Sukovitsyn scored to give SKA victory. Another loss happened away to Chayka Balaklava on 20 May. Dnipro chose 4–3–3 formation and played very defensively. However, a rare counterattack gave Dnipro the lead. Chayka players kept attacking and were awarded twenty-two corners. Towards the end a Dnipro defender handled the ball and Smirnov scored his penalty kick, Three minutes later Chayka defender scored a second goal and won the game. Two days later more than fifteen thousand spectators gathered to watch Dnipro and Dynamo Kyiv play. Dynamo players were pressing and attacking all game and scored three times. A few minutes before the end of the game Prymoska managed to score for Dnipro. On the twenty-fourth Dnipro hosted Kolhospnyk Cherkasy. Since it rained the whole day, the pitch turned to bog. Visitors played short passing game and Dnipro played long balls to forwards Stupak and Prymostka. Heavy rain returned in the second half and both teams were attacking. Robarovskyi was successful and his goal gave Dnipro its second victory. Both teams had a player sent-off. On 30 May Dnipro traveled to Avanhard Chernivtsi. Dnipro chose a very defensive 6-2-2 formation. This proved unsuccessful as hosts scored three minutes into the second half and won the game.

=== June ===
The first match in June brought Dnipro one more point. On 3 June neighboring team Kolhospnyk Poltava came to Kremenchuk to play in a first official match between the teams. Kolhospnyk chose to sit back for the first twenty minutes and then began attacking. The match became more aggressive, and the official did not manage to control the game. Yaroshenko was sent-off in the first half for Dnipro. Visitor also lost a player for arguing with the referee. Visitor defender Klusovych replaced an injured player and was also sent-off a minute later for a bad tackle on Prymostka who left the field injured. Both teams finished the game with nine man. Next day Dnipro hosted Metalurh Zaporizhzhia in a friendly match. Visitors scored four goals and won the game. Three days later Dnipro played away at Lokomotyv Vinnytsia. Lokomotyv was third in the league and Dnipro fourteenth. Lokomotyv easily controlled the game, however they were unable to break down Dnipro defense. Yefimenko was sent-off for Dnipro after thirty-five minutes after a bad tackle. After the sending-off, Dnipro players broke down and were unable to do anything constructive. Locomotyv players scored three times in the second half and easily won the match. On the thirteenth Dnipro hosted Sudnobudivnyk Mykolaiv one of league leaders. Dnipro began the game with attacks. However, their usual inability to keep the ball in the final third prevented them from scoring. They lost the match 1:0. Four days later Dnipro went to Zirka Kirovohrad. The match was a 6:3 loss. On 21 June Prymostka failed to score a penalty kick and Dnipro had to settle for a 0:0 draw with Avanhard Zhovti Vody. After playing each opponent once, Dnipro was in fifteenth place in the league. On the twenty-eight Dnipro faced Stroitel Bălți. The visitors scored and early goal and Stupak equalized near the hour mark. Akopov doubled the lead and brought Dnipro its third win.

=== July ===
On 4 July Dnipro hosted Nistrul Bender. Both teams won their previous match. In the pregame interview manager Melnychenko stated that his team will only attack. Boichenko was the first to score in the thirty-third minute. He doubled the lead in the second half with Yefimenko adding another goal ten minutes later. Six minutes before the final whistle visitors pulled one goal back. Four days later Dnipro traveled to Luchaferul Tiraspol. Both teams defended equally great which made any attacking attempts fruitless. Match finished with a 0:0 draw. In another four days Dnipro traveled to Budivelnyk Kherson. Budivelnyk attackers were not very successful in prior games. In this game they had more luck. First half was goalless, however early after the restart Dnipro defender brought down an opposition attacker. Another striker stepped up to take the penalty and give the lead to Budivelnyk. Later another Budivelnyk striker scored. Dnipro had their first loss in five matches. On the eighteenth Dnipro had its third away match at Shakhtar Oleksandriia. Dnipro lost the match 4:0. On the twenty-second Dnipro hosted Dunayets Izmail. The visitors began the match aggressively and conceded a second-minute penalty. Burenkov scored and forced the visitors to reply with a series of attacks which were not successful due to nervousness of the attackers. With one minute left in the first half Akopov scored by sending the ball into the top corner. In the seventieth minute Huzikov made the score 3:0. This gave Dnipro confidence in victory, and they became careless. Visitors took advantage of this and scored five minutes later. A few minutes later they scored another goal when Klimanov substitute goalkeeper let the ball slip between his hands. With time running out visitors were unable to level the game, giving Dnipro its fifth win of the season. Captain Prymostka had a very weak game which led supporters heckle him and other players. Four days later Dnipro hosted Avanhard Chernivtsi. Dnipro went into the game needing a win. They had a chance to take the lead in the forty-fourth minute. Akopov failed to score and eventually visitors took the lead in the sixty-ninth minute and won the game.

=== August ===
On 1 August Dnipro hosted SKA Kyiv. SKA who were zone leaders easily defeated Dnipro, scoring five goals. Four days later Dnipro traveled to Kolhospnyk Cherkasy. The team again was unsuccessful and lost 2:0. On 9 August Dnipro defeated visitors Chayka Balaklava 1:0 with Boichenko providing the winning goal. On the fifteenth Dnipro traveled to their neighbors Kolhospnyk Poltava. This time refereeing was much better. Kolhospnyk began much quicker than Dnipro and was rewarded with a goal in the third minute. In the thirty-sixth minute Kolhospnyk doubled the lead. Third goal was scored by former Dnipro player Yurii Yachniev. Dnipro conceded one more goal without troubling the opposition. Four days later Dnipro drew 1:1 with Lokomotyv Vinnytsia at home. Both teams needed a win as Dnipro was in the last place and Lokomotyv was battling for second place. Dnipro players were playing long balls again and opposition defenders had no problems clearing those. In the last minute of the first half Kuzmmychov scored to give Dnipro the lead. After the break Dnipro player tried to extend their lead, however they were not successful and Lokomotyv managed to equalize with eleven minutes remaining. Dnipro played its last home game of the regular season on 23 August against Zirka Kirovohrad. Visitors were the first to score after a defensive mistake by Lulko in the first half. Stupak scored from a free-kick in the second half. He scored again in the seventy-eighth minute to give Dnipro its seventh win. During the week between the league games, Dnipro played a friendly game with Combined Moscow Veterans team. The difference in technical ability of both teams was clearly visible as visiting defenders easily dealt with any attacking attempts by Dnipro. Halfway through the first half, the visitors scored their first goal. Dnipro players struggled to keep up with the pace of veterans who scored another goal. On 29 August Dnipro played away at Sudnobudivnyk Mykolaiv. The hosts scored three times and Dnipro only one through Platitsyn.

=== September ===
On 5 September Dnipro lost 2:0 in an away match to Avanhard Zhovti Vody. The hosts played much better than the Dnipro players. Kushnyrskyi was sent off for hitting an opposition player. Dnipro was in the sixteenth place after the final match. On 13 September Dnipro traveled to Shakhtar Horlivka to play in the 1964 Cup of Central Committee of Leninist Communist League of Youth of Ukraine. Dnipro was unsuccessful and lost 4:0. Dnipro began their play-off games for the 37—41 spot on nineteenth, traveling to Burevisnyk Melitopol. Dnipro began the match with high energy and were rewarded with an early goal in the fifteenth minute. The hosts then scored from a corner kick. In the second half Tambovtsev scored two goals in one minute to make the final score 3–1. Four days later Dnipro drew 0–0 at home with Torpedo Kharkiv.

=== October ===
On 3 October Dnipro at home drew 1–1 with Azovstal Zhdanov. Four days later Dnipro lost 2–1 to Dniprovets Dniprodzerzhynsk. Local newspaper noted that Dnipro was playing much better in the second stage than in the first. On the eleventh Dnipro hosted Burevisnyk Melitopol. Visitors were able to score twice, with Dnipro unable to respond. Three days later Torpedo Kharkiv defeated Dnipro 3–0. On the eighteenth Dnipro finally won against Dniprovets Dniprodzerzhynsk. It was a narrow 1–0 win, where Dniprovets had a player sent-off. Dnipro played a friendly match with Dnipro Kremenchuk HES in Svitlovodsk. The outcome of the math was not recorded. The last match of the stage was played on 31 October. Dnipro played away with Azovstal Zhdanov. Dnipro was unable to score once more, not registering a single shot on goal during the game. It finished with a 2–0 loss. Dnipro occupied the bottom spot finishing forty-first in the combined league table.

=== End of season ===
Dnipro had a very unsuccessful season, at times playing very well and failing at others. Dnipro remained in the league. Toward the end of season, Dnipro played a few friendly matches to help see potential first team players. A new coach Hennadii Rudynskyi joined the team from Zirka Kirovohrad. Dnipro played one more friendly in December with a local team Avanhard Kremenchuk. It finished 1–1.

== Team kit ==
The team did not have a special kit, using various kits. The most common kit was a yellow shirt and light blue shorts. Other shirt colors used were red, white, light blue and orange. The shorts were blue, white and light blue.

== Management team ==
Position	Name	Year appointed	Last club/team	References
Manager	Mykola Melnychenko	1964		
Assistant Coach	Hryhorii Miroshnyk	1964		
Assistant Coach	Hennadii Rudynskyi	November 1964	Zirka Kirovohrad	

== Pre-season and friendlies ==
In preseason Dnipro won against a team from Izhevsk, drew multiple matches and lost to SKA Lviv.

Win Draw Loss Fixtures

Results list Dnipro's goal tally first.

Date	Opponent	Venue	Result	Dnipro scorers	Referee
22 May 1964 – 18:00	Dynamo Kyiv	Home	1–3	Prymostka ?'	Pavlo Dudnichenko
4 June 1964	Metalurh Zaporizhzhia	Home	0–4		
August 1964	Combined Moscow Veterans team	Home	0–2		
October 1964	Dnipro KremHES (Note: KremHES was name of Svitlovodsk in 1960s)	Away	?–?		
December 1964	Avanhard Kremenchuk	Away	1–1	Unknown goalscorer ?'	

== Competitions ==
=== Overall record ===
Competition	First match	Last match	Starting round	Final position	Record							
Competition	First match	Last match	Starting round	Final position	Pld	W	D	L	GF	GA	GD	Win %
1964 Ukrainian Class B	12 April 1964	5 September 1964	Matchday 1	20th	30	7	5	18	24	54	−30	23.33
Play-off Places 37–41	19 September 1964	31 October 1964	Play-off Matchday 1	41st	8	1	2	5	4	13	−9	12.50
1964 Soviet Cup	22 April 1964	22 April 1964	Ukrainian 2nd Zone 1/8 Final	Ukrainian 2nd Zone 1/8 Final	1	0	0	1	1	3	−2	0.00
1964 Cup of Central Committee of Leninist Communist League of Youth of Ukraine	13 September 1964	13 September 1964	1/32 Final	1/32 Final	1	0	0	1	0	4	−4	0.00
Total					40	8	7	25	29	74	−45	20.00

Source: Competitions

=== Ukrainian Class B ===
==== Results summary ====
Point total was 19, as 2 point for win were awarded.

Overall								Home						Away					
Pld	W	D	L	GF	GA	GD	Pts	W	D	L	GF	GA	GD	W	D	L	GF	GA	GD
30	7	5	18	24	54	−30	19	7	4	4	18	17	+1	0	1	14	6	37	−31

Source: wildstat.com

==== League table ====
Pos	Team	Pld	W	D	L	GF	GA	GD	Pts
12	FC Dunayets Izmail	30	10	5	15	22	39	−17	25
13	FC Luchaferul Tiraspol	30	8	7	15	27	35	−8	23
14	FC Avanhard Zhovti Vody	30	8	6	16	23	33	−10	22
15	FC Shakhtar Oleksandria	30	8	5	17	32	42	−10	21
16	FC Dnipro Kremenchuk	30	7	5	18	24	54	−30	19

==== Zone 2 ====
The league fixtures were announced on 25 March 1964. Second round fixtures were released on 27 June 1964.

Win Draw Loss Fixtures

Results list Dnipro's goal tally first.

Date	Opponent	Venue	Result	Dnipro scorers	Referee	Attendance	Position
12 April 1964 – 16:00	Stroitel Bălți	Away	0–2		Otari Dzhebashvili	6,000	
18 April 1964 – 17:30	Nistrul Bender	Away	0–3		Kostiantyn Diatlov	7,000	
26 April 1964 – 16:00	Luchaferul Tiraspol	Home	1–1	Prymostka 87’ (Note: Other source listed Stupak as goal scorer)	Mykola Yevreinov	11,000	
2 May 1964 – 16:00	Budivelnyk Kherson	Home	0–1		Anatolii Hladkyi	5,000	16th
6 May 1964 – 19:00	Shakhtar Oleksandriia	Home	4–2	Stupak 3', Prymostka 14', 22' 53'	Gavriil Korobov	10,000	15th
10 May 1964 – 16:00	Dunayets Izmail	Away	0–1		Mykola Dementiiev	4,000	
16 May 1964 – 17:00	SKA Kyiv	Away	1–2	Prymostka 80'	Oleksandr Svanadze	3,500	
20 May 1964 – 17:30	Chayka Balaklava	Away	1–2	Prymostka ?'	Yulii Rusynovych	3,500	
24 May 1964 – 17:00	Kolhospnyk Cherkasy	Home	1–0	Robarovskyi 69'	Mykola Maznichenko	5,000	
30 May 1964 – 18:00	Avanhard Chernivtsi	Away	0–1		Iosif Piridi	3,000	
3 June 1964 – 19:00	Kolhospnyk Poltava	Home	0–0		Yosyp Oberberg	12,000	
7 June 1964 – 16:00	Lokomotyv Vinnytsia	Away	0–3		Fedir Kuruts	8,000	15th
13 June 1964 – 19:00	Sudnobudivnyk Mykolaiv	Home	0–1		Anatolii Shvetsov	5,500	
17 June 1964 – 18:30	Zirka Kirovohrad	Away	3–6	Yefimenko 34', Stupak 48', 72' (pen.) (Note: Other source listed Prymostka as penalty kick scorer)	Mykola Balakin	8,000	
21 June 1964 – 18:00	Avanhard Zhovti Vody	Home	0–0		Vitalii Ostroukhov	5,000	
28 June 1964 – 18:00	Stroitel Bălți	Home	2–1	Stupak 59', Akopov ?'		5,000	14th
4 July 1964 – 19:00	Nistrul Bender	Home	3–1	Boichenko31', ?', Yefimenko ?'	Rafat Burnashev	7,500	
8 July 1964 – 19:00	Luchaferul Tiraspol	Away	0–0		Vitalii Luhovskyi	5,000	
12 July 1964 – 18:00	Budivelnyk Kherson	Away	0–2		Serhii Rozdorozhniuk	10,000	
18 July 1964 – 19:00	Shakhtar Oleksandriia	Away	0–4		Yevhenii Lepetukha	8,000	
22 July 1964 – 19:00	Dunayets Izmail	Home	3–2	Burenkov2' (pen.), Akopov 44', Huzikov 70'	Stanislav Neverkevych	7,000	
26 July 1964 – 19:00	Avanhard Chernivtsi	Home	0–1		Vadym Kalashnikov		
1 August 1964 – 18:00	SKA Kyiv	Home	0–5		Serhii Rozdorozhniuk	10,000	
5 August 1964 – 18:30	Kolhospnyk Cherkasy	Away	0–2		Vasyl Rybalov	1,200	
9 August 1964 – 18:30	Chayka Balaklava	Home	1–0	Boichenko ?'	Serhii Syzonenko	10,000	
15 August 1964 – 18:00	Kolhospnyk Poltava	Away	0–4		Oleksandr Tsapovetskyi	15,000	
19 August 1964 – 18:30	Lokomotyv Vinnytsia	Home	1–1	Kuzmichev ?'	Heorhii Aleksieiev	5,500	
23 August 1964 – 18:00	Zirka Kirovohrad	Home	2–1	Stupak ?', 78'	Pylyp Tiurikov	5,500	15th
29 August 1964 – 18:00	Sudnobudivnyk Mykolaiv	Away	3–1	Platytsin ?'	Vitalii Ostroukhov	7,000	
5 September 1964 – 18:00	Avanhard Zhovti Vody	Away	0–2		Heorhii Petrovych	3,000	16th

=== Second stage ===
The second stage took part from 19 September to 31 October. Dnipro faced Dniprovets Dniprodzerzhynsk, Torpedo Kharkiv, Burevisnyk Melitopol and Azovstal Zhdanov to determine final standing in the league for places 37 to 41.

==== Results summary ====
Point total was 4, as 2 points for win were awarded.

Overall								Home						Away					
Pld	W	D	L	GF	GA	GD	Pts	W	D	L	GF	GA	GD	W	D	L	GF	GA	GD
8	1	2	5	4	13	−9	4	1	2	1	2	3	−1	0	0	4	2	10	−8

Source: wildstat.com

==== League table ====
Pos	Team	Pld	W	D	L	GF	GA	GD	Pts
37	FC Dniprovets Dniprodzerzhynsk	8	5	2	1	10	4	+6	12
38	FC Torpedo Kharkiv	8	4	3	1	11	6	+5	11
39	FC Burevisnyk Melitopol	8	4	1	3	13	7	+6	9
40	FC Azovstal Zhdanov	8	1	2	5	7	15	−8	4
41	FC Dnipro Kremenchuk	8	1	2	5	4	13	−9	4

==== Places 37–41 ====
Win Draw Loss Fixtures

Results list Dnipro's goal tally first.

Date	Opponent	Venue	Result	Dnipro scorers	Referee	Attendance	Position
19 September 1964 – 16:00	Burevisnyk Melitopol	Away	1–3	Unknown goalscorer ?'			
27 September 1964	Torpedo Kharkiv	Home	0–0				
3 October 1964	Azovstal Zhdanov	Home	1–1	Unknown goalscorer ?'			
7 October 1964	Dniprovets Dniprodzerzhynsk	Away	1–2	Unknown goalscorer ?'			
11 October 1964	Burevisnyk Melitopol	Home	0–2				
14 October 1964	Torpedo Kharkiv	Away	0–3				
18 October 1964	Dniprovets Dniprodzerzhynsk	Home	1–0	Unknown goalscorer ?'			
31 October 1964	Azovstal Zhdanov	Away	0–2				41st

=== Soviet Cup ===
Out of 48 class B clubs from Ukraine, Belarus and Moldavia only 3 were permitted into the final stage of the cup. 48 teams were split into three groups. Dnipro was assigned to second group. Cup calendar was released on 25 March. Dnipro was scheduled to play Avanhard Chernivtsi on 23 April. If case of a win their next match was scheduled for 29 April and 13 May.

Win Draw Loss Fixtures

Date	Opponent	Venue	Result	Dnipro scorers	Referee	Attendance
22 April 1964 – 18:00	Avanhard Chernivtsi	Away	1–3	Stupak ?'	Heorhii Mulyk	7,500

=== CC LCLYU Cup ===
Win Draw Loss Fixtures

Date	Opponent	Venue	Result	Dnipro scorers	Referee
19 September 1964	Shakhtar Horlivka	Away	0–4		

== Statistics ==
=== Appearances and goals ===
First squad list was published on 1 April 1963. Known appearances include all competitions (League, Cup, Cup of Central Committee and play-off matches. Known Squad Numbers are listed, numbers in ( ) are also known numbers for players during the season. Some games only have partial records provided by Pyrukhin. Mykola Prymostka was the team captain. In his absence Valerii Lulko was the captain in four league matches.

24 goals were scored in the league. Both Stupak and Prymostka have 6 goals given to them. Pyrukhin states that in two matches in rounds 3 and 14 both had one goal. However another source states that each of them could be the correct scorer in a different match or both matches. Stupak was the only scorer in the Cup match. All four play-off goalscorers are unknown. Mykola Prymostka scored a hat-trick against Shakhtar Oleksandriia on 6 May 1964.

The plus (+) symbol denotes an appearance as a substitute, hence 2+1 indicates two appearances in the starting XI and one appearance as a substitute.

No.	Pos	Nat	Player	Total		League		Play-off		Cup		Cup of Central Committee	
No.	Pos	Nat	Player	Apps	Goals	Apps	Goals	Apps	Goals	Apps	Goals	Apps	Goals
	GK	(Soviet Union) URS	Serhii Morozov	5	0	3+1	0	0	0	1	0	-	-
	GK	(Soviet Union) URS	Viktor Slabko	12	0	10+2	0	-	-	-	-	-	-
	GK	(Soviet Union) URS	V. Klimanov	11	0	5+3	0	2	0	0	0-	1	0
	GK	(Soviet Union) URS	Yurii Semchenko	14	0	12+1	0	-	-	0+1	0	-	-
	DF	(Soviet Union) URS	Valerii Kushnyrskyi	28	0	23+2	0	2	0	1	0	-	-
	DF	(Soviet Union) URS	Yurii Puzikov	30	0	25+1	0	2	0	1	0	1	0
	DF	(Soviet Union) URS	Valerii Lulko	32	0	29	0	2	0	0	0	1	0
	DF	(Soviet Union) URS	Volodymyr Skotnykov	19	0	15+2	0	0	0	1	0	1	0
	DF	(Soviet Union) URS	Ihor Burenkov	29	1	22+3	1	2	0	1	0	1	0
	DF	(Soviet Union) URS	Anatolii Zhyvotenko	9	0	8+1	0	0	0	-	-	-	-
	DF	(Soviet Union) URS	Volodymyr Solodovnykov	6	0	4+2	0	0	0	-	-	-	-
	MF	(Soviet Union) URS	Viktor Yefimenko	27	2	22+1	2	2	0	1	0	1	0
	MF	(Soviet Union) URS	Volodymyr Robarovskyi	16	1	15	1	0	0	1	0	-	-
	MF	(Soviet Union) URS	Valentyn Biesiedin	2	0	2	0	0	0	-	-	-	-
	FW	(Soviet Union) URS	Anatolii Lytvynov	11	0	9+2	0	0	0	-	-	-	-
	FW	(Soviet Union) URS	Viktor Stupak	31	7	26+1	6	2	0	0+1	1	1	0
	FW	(Soviet Union) URS	Mykola Prymostka	33	6	26+3	6	2	0	0+1	0	1	0
	FW	(Soviet Union) URS	Stanislav Yaroshenko	14	0	13	0	0	0	1	0	-	-
	FW	(Soviet Union) URS	Anatolii Kozaiev	5	0	5	0	0	0	-	-	-	-
	FW	(Soviet Union) URS	Volodymyr Boichenko	14	3	12+2	3	0	0	-	-	-	-
	FW	(Soviet Union) URS	Robert Akopov	10	2	8+2	2	0	0	-	-	-	-
	FW	(Soviet Union) URS	Yurii Kuzmichev	15	1	12	1	2	0	0	0	1	0
	FW	(Soviet Union) URS	Leonid Platytsin	12	1	6+4	1	1	0	0	0	1	0
	DF	(Soviet Union) URS	Vladyslav Soroka	2	0	1	0	0	0	1	0	-	-
		(Soviet Union) URS	I. Petrov	2	0	0+1	0	0	0	1	0	-	-
	MF	(Soviet Union) URS	V. Beschastnyi	1	0	0	0	0	0	1	0	-	-
		(Soviet Union) URS	V. Pavlishyn	6	0	3+3	0	0	0	-	-	-	-
		(Soviet Union) URS	Oleksandr Huzikov	13	1	11	1	1	0	0	0	1	0
		(Soviet Union) URS	V. Petriaiev	6	0	4	0	2	0	-	-	-	-

Source: Pyrukhin

== Sources ==
- Pyrukhin, Yurii (n.d.a), Днепр Кременчуг футбол 1963-1969 [Dnipro Kremenchuk football 1963-1969] (in Ukrainian), Kremenchuk
- Pyrukhin, Yurii (n.d.b), Энциклопедия кременчугского футбола [Encyclopedia of Kremenchuk football] (in Russian), Kremenchuk
