= 1965 Ukrainian Class B =

Football Championship of Ukrainian SSR
- Season: 1965
- Champions: SKA Lviv
- Promoted: SKA Lviv; SKA Kyiv; SC Tavriya Simferopol; FC Zirka Kirovohrad; FC Sudnobudivnyk Mykolaiv
- Relegated: FC Stroitel Beltsy; FC Nistru Bendery; FC Lucaferul Tiraspol; FC Dynamo-2 Kyiv (dissolved); FC Neman Grodno; FC Spartak Brest; FC Dvina Vitebsk; FC Spartak Mogilev (all four transferred to the Russian Class B)

The 1965 Football Championship of Ukrainian SSR (Class B) was the 35th season of association football competition of the Ukrainian SSR, which was part of the Ukrainian Class B. It was the fifteenth in the Soviet Class B and the third season of the Ukrainian Class B.

The 1965 Football Championship of Ukrainian SSR (Class B) was won by SKA Lviv.

== Location map ==
Locations of teams in Class B
Locations of Belarusian teams in Ukrainian Class B

== Zone 1 (Center) ==
=== Relegated teams ===
- none

=== Promoted teams ===
- none

=== Relocated and renamed teams ===
- FC Avanhard Kerch was last year known as FC Metalurh Kerch

=== Final standings ===
Pos	Team	Pld	W	D	L	GF	GA	GD	Pts	Qualification
1	SKA Kyiv	30	22	4	4	65	22	+43	48	
2	FC Avanhard Zhovti Vody	30	17	8	5	41	18	+23	42	
3	FC Kolos Poltava	30	11	14	5	32	19	+13	36	
4	FC Shakhtar Oleksandriya	30	10	14	6	34	20	+14	34	
5	FC Dnipro Kremenchuk	30	9	13	8	21	21	0	31	
6	FC Dvina Vitebsk	30	8	14	8	29	28	+1	30	Withdrew
7	FC Spartak Sumy	30	9	12	9	28	28	0	30	
8	FC Kolhospnyk Cherkasy	30	10	10	10	30	30	0	30	
9	FC Desna Chernihiv	30	8	14	8	32	33	−1	30	
10	FC Spartak Mogilev	30	6	17	7	14	18	−4	29	Withdrew
11	FC Dniprovets Dniprodzerzhynsk	30	6	15	9	16	20	−4	27	
12	FC Hirnyk Kryvyi Rih	30	10	7	13	24	32	−8	27	
13	FC Chaika Balaklava	30	10	7	13	25	35	−10	27	
14	FC Avanhard Kerch	30	8	6	16	30	47	−17	22	
15	FC Stroitel Beltsy	30	6	8	16	22	40	−18	20	
16	FC Lucaferul Tiraspol	30	4	9	17	18	50	−32	17	

== Zone 2 (West) ==
=== Relegated teams ===
- none

=== Promoted teams ===
- FC Avtomobilist Odesa

=== Relocated and renamed teams ===
- FC Dynamo-2 Kyiv replaced the team of Kyiv aviation plant, Temp Kyiv
- FC Bukovyna Chernivtsi was last year known as FC Avanhard Chernivtsi

=== Final standings ===
Pos	Team	Pld	W	D	L	GF	GA	GD	Pts	Qualification
1	SKA Lviv	30	20	6	4	74	20	+54	46	
2	FC Avanhard Ternopil	30	16	8	6	38	21	+17	40	
3	FC Zirka Kirovohrad	30	12	15	3	31	22	+9	39	
4	FC Dynamo Khmelnytskyi	30	14	9	7	40	26	+14	37	
5	FC Naftovyk Drohobych	30	13	10	7	38	28	+10	36	
6	FC Spartak Ivano-Frankivsk	30	13	9	8	38	26	+12	35	
7	FC Bukovyna Chernivtsi	30	11	8	11	33	42	−9	30	
8	FC Polissya Zhytomyr	30	12	5	13	34	33	+1	29	
9	FC Avtomobilist Odesa	30	10	7	13	24	41	−17	27	
10	FC Spartak Brest	30	9	8	13	28	30	−2	26	Withdrew
11	FC Neman Grodno	30	9	7	14	27	34	−7	25	Withdrew
12	FC Volyn Lutsk	30	6	12	12	26	35	−9	24	
13	FC Dynamo-2 Kyiv	30	9	5	16	31	52	−21	23	
14	FC Verkhovyna Uzhhorod	30	7	8	15	19	35	−16	22	
15	FC Dunayets Izmail	30	6	9	15	27	50	−23	21	
16	FC Kolhospnyk Rovno	30	7	6	17	26	39	−13	20	

== Zone 3 (Southeast) ==
=== Relegated teams ===
- none

=== Promoted teams ===
- FC Shakhtar Krasnyi Luch – (debut)
- FC Shakhtar Torez
- FC Shakhtar Yenakieve

=== Relocated and renamed teams ===
- FC Lokomotyv Kherson was last year known as FC Budivelnyk Kherson, being transferred to the local administration of Odesa Railways
- FC Spartak Melitopol was last year known as FC Burevisnyk Melitopol

=== Final standings ===
Pos	Team	Pld	W	D	L	GF	GA	GD	Pts	Qualification
1	SC Tavriya Simferopol	32	16	8	8	42	24	+18	40	
2	FC Shakhtar Kadiivka	32	14	11	7	43	30	+13	39	
3	FC Komunarets Komunarsk	32	12	15	5	33	24	+9	39	
4	SKF Sevastopol	32	15	8	9	54	34	+20	38	
5	FC Sudnobudivnyk Mykolaiv	32	13	11	8	42	35	+7	37	
6	FC Spartak Melitopol	32	15	6	11	55	51	+4	36	
7	FC Lokomotyv Kherson	32	11	12	9	32	28	+4	34	
8	FC Khimik Severodonetsk	32	9	16	7	30	29	+1	34	
9	FC Shakhtar Horlivka	32	13	7	12	40	33	+7	33	
10	FC Torpedo Kharkiv	32	10	13	9	24	23	+1	33	
11	FC Shakhtar Torez	32	12	9	11	32	41	−9	33	
12	FC Trubnyk Nikopol	32	9	14	9	35	32	+3	32	
13	FC Nistrul Bendery	32	11	7	14	35	40	−5	29	Withdrew
14	FC Lokomotyv Donetsk	32	7	11	14	21	36	−15	25	
15	FC Shakhtar Krasnyi Luch	32	6	10	16	28	35	−7	22	
16	FC Shakhtar Yenakieve	32	7	6	19	28	50	−22	20	
17	FC Avanhard Kramatorsk	32	7	6	19	23	52	−29	20	

== Second stage ==
Belarusian teams did not participate in the second stage.

=== Places 1–6 ===
Pos	Team	Pld	W	D	L	GF	GA	GD	Pts
1	SKA Lviv (C, P)	10	7	2	1	24	9	+15	16
2	SKA Kyiv (P)	10	7	1	2	23	16	+7	15
3	FC Avanhard Zhovti Vody	10	4	3	3	14	9	+5	11
4	SC Tavriya Simferopol (P)	10	3	4	3	10	11	−1	10
5	FC Avanhard Ternopil	10	1	4	5	6	14	−8	6
6	FC Shakhtar Kadiivka	10	0	2	8	4	22	−18	2

(C) Champions; (P) Promoted

=== Places 7–12 ===
Pos	Team	Pld	W	D	L	GF	GA	GD	Pts
7	FC Zirka Kirovohrad (P)	10	6	3	1	14	9	+5	15
8	FC Komunarets Komunarsk	10	6	1	3	12	10	+2	13
9	FC Shakhtar Oleksandriya	10	4	2	4	12	9	+3	10
10	FC Dynamo Khmelnytskyi	10	3	2	5	13	15	−2	8
11	SKF Sevastopol	10	2	4	4	8	10	−2	8
12	FC Kolos Poltava	10	2	2	6	7	13	−6	6

(P) Promoted

=== Places 13–18 ===
Pos	Team	Pld	W	D	L	GF	GA	GD	Pts
13	FC Sudnobudivnyk Mykolaiv (P)	10	6	3	1	15	9	+6	15
14	FC Spartak Melitopol	10	5	1	4	24	25	−1	11
15	FC Spartak Sumy	10	3	3	4	12	12	0	9
16	FC Dnipro Kremenchuk	10	3	3	4	9	9	0	9
17	FC Naftovyk Drohobych	10	3	2	5	13	15	−2	8
18	FC Spartak Ivano-Frankivsk	10	3	2	5	11	14	−3	8

(P) Promoted

=== Places 19–24 ===
Pos	Team	Pld	W	D	L	GF	GA	GD	Pts
19	FC Kolhospnyk Cherkasy	10	7	2	1	14	8	+6	16
20	FC Bukovyna Chernivtsi	10	5	1	4	15	8	+7	11
21	FC Desna Chernihiv	10	4	2	4	13	14	−1	10
22	FC Polissya Zhytomyr	10	3	4	3	6	8	−2	10
23	FC Lokomotyv Kherson	10	2	5	3	9	9	0	9
24	FC Khimik Severodonetsk	10	0	4	6	2	12	−10	4

=== Places 25–30 ===
Pos	Team	Pld	W	D	L	GF	GA	GD	Pts
25	FC Dniprovets Dniprodzerzhynsk	10	7	1	2	11	6	+5	15
26	FC Torpedo Kharkiv	10	5	1	4	10	12	−2	11
27	FC Hirnyk Kryvyi Rih	10	4	1	5	11	10	+1	9
28	FC Avtomobilist Odesa	10	4	1	5	14	14	0	9
29	FC Shakhtar Horlivka	10	3	3	4	6	7	−1	9
30	FC Volyn Lutsk	10	3	1	6	14	17	−3	7

=== Places 31–36 ===
Pos	Team	Pld	W	D	L	GF	GA	GD	Pts
31	FC Shakhtar Torez	10	5	3	2	16	10	+6	13
32	FC Chaika Balaklava	10	4	3	3	9	14	−5	11
33	FC Trubnyk Nikopol	10	3	4	3	19	10	+9	10
34	FC Dynamo-2 Kyiv	10	3	4	3	14	16	−2	10
35	FC Verkhovyna Uzhhorod	10	4	1	5	10	9	+1	9
36	FC Avanhard Kerch	10	1	5	4	12	19	−7	7

=== Places 37–42 ===
Pos	Team	Pld	W	D	L	GF	GA	GD	Pts
37	FC Stroitel Beltsy (R)	10	6	3	1	16	9	+7	15
38	FC Lokomotyv Donetsk	10	6	1	3	15	7	+8	13
39	FC Nistrul Bendery (R)	10	6	1	3	7	6	+1	13
40	FC Kolhospnyk Rovno	10	3	3	4	10	8	+2	9
41	FC Dunayets Izmail	10	2	2	6	8	14	−6	6
42	FC Lucaferul Tiraspol (R)	10	0	4	6	7	19	−12	4

(R) Relegated

=== Places 43–45 ===
Pos	Team	Pld	W	D	L	GF	GA	GD	Pts
43	FC Shakhtar Yenakieve	4	2	1	1	4	2	+2	5
44	FC Avanhard Kramatorsk	4	2	1	1	3	2	+1	5
45	FC Shakhtar Krasnyi Luch	4	1	0	3	3	6	−3	2

== Promotion / relegation play-off ==
Both games were played in Simferopol. Both teams were promoted.

Team 1	Agg.	Team 2	1st leg	2nd leg
FC Karpaty Lviv	0–5	SKA Lviv	0–3	0–2

== See also ==
- Soviet Second League
