= 1964 Ukrainian Class B =

Football Championship of Ukrainian SSR
- Season: 1964
- Champions: FC Lokomotyv Vinnytsia
- Relegated: FC Azovstal Mariupol

The 1964 Football Championship of Ukrainian SSR (Class B) was the 34th season of association football competition of the Ukrainian SSR, which was part of the Ukrainian Class B. It was the fourteenth in the Soviet Class B and the second season of the Ukrainian Class B.

The 1964 Football Championship of Ukrainian SSR (Class B) was won by FC Lokomotyv Vinnytsia.

== Location map ==
Locations of teams in Class B. Zone 1 - green dots, Zone 2 - red dots and Zone 3 - blue dots.
Locations of Belarusian teams in Ukrainian Class B

== Zone 1 (West) ==
=== Relegated teams ===
- none

=== Promoted teams ===
- FC Neman Grodno – (debut)
- FC Temp Kyiv – (debut), winner of the promotion/relegation play-off

=== Relocated and renamed teams ===
- FC Spartak Mogilev last season competed for the Union republics Class B
- FC Spartak Brest last season competed for the Union republics Class B
- FC Dvina Vitebsk last season competed for the Union republics Class B

=== Final standings ===
Pos	Team	Pld	W	D	L	GF	GA	GD	Pts
1	FC Polissya Zhytomyr	30	18	8	4	32	11	+21	44
2	SKA Lviv	30	14	9	7	47	21	+26	37
3	FC Verkhovyna Uzhhorod	30	16	5	9	38	28	+10	37
4	FC Spartak Brest	30	12	12	6	25	12	+13	36
5	FC Temp Kiev	30	14	8	8	38	26	+12	36
6	FC Avanhard Ternopil	30	12	9	9	32	24	+8	33
7	FC Dynamo Khmelnytskyi	30	12	8	10	35	22	+13	32
8	FC Spartak Mogilev	30	12	8	10	31	25	+6	32
9	Kolhospnyk Rovne	30	11	7	12	30	27	+3	29
10	FC Naftovyk Drohobych	30	8	10	12	22	25	−3	26
11	FC Desna Chernihiv	30	8	10	12	23	31	−8	26
12	FC Spartak Ivano-Frankivsk	30	7	12	11	19	33	−14	26
13	FC Volyn Lutsk	30	7	10	13	23	34	−11	24
14	FC Dvina Vitebsk	30	8	8	14	16	29	−13	24
15	FC Spartak Sumy	30	5	10	15	20	39	−19	20
16	FC Neman Hrodno	30	6	6	18	16	60	−44	18

== Zone 2 (Center) ==
=== Relegated teams ===
- none

=== Promoted teams ===
- FC Chaika Balaklava – (debut)
- FC Dunayets Izmayil – (debut)

=== Relocated and renamed teams ===
- FC Nistrul Bender last season competed for the Union republics Class B
- FC Lucaferul Tiraspol last season competed for the Union republics Class B
- FC Stroitel Beltsy last season competed for the Union republics Class B

=== Final standings ===
Pos	Team	Pld	W	D	L	GF	GA	GD	Pts
1	SKA Kyiv	30	21	4	5	55	19	+36	46
2	FC Lokomotyv Vinnytsia	30	16	9	5	40	17	+23	41
3	FC Zirka Kirovohrad	30	16	6	8	47	31	+16	38
4	FC Kolhospnyk Poltava	30	13	11	6	35	21	+14	37
5	FC Kolhospnyk Cherkasy	30	11	12	7	32	24	+8	34
6	FC Sudnobudivnyk Mykolaiv	30	13	8	9	32	26	+6	34
7	FC Chayka Balaklava	30	12	6	12	30	38	−8	30
8	FC Budivelnyk Kherson	30	11	7	12	29	30	−1	29
9	FC Stroitel Bălţi	30	10	8	12	35	37	−2	28
10	FC Nistrul Bender	30	10	7	13	29	32	−3	27
11	FC Avanhard Chernivtsi	30	9	8	13	32	46	−14	26
12	FC Dunayets Izmail	30	10	5	15	22	39	−17	25
13	FC Luchaferul Tiraspol	30	8	7	15	27	35	−8	23
14	FC Avanhard Zhovti Vody	30	8	6	16	23	33	−10	22
15	FC Shakhtar Oleksandria	30	8	5	17	32	42	−10	21
16	FC Dnipro Kremenchuk	30	7	5	18	24	54	−30	19

== Zone 3 (Southeast) ==
=== Relegated teams ===
- none

=== Promoted teams ===
- none

=== Relocated and renamed teams ===
- FC Komunarets Komunarsk last season competed as FC Metalurh Komunarsk

=== Final standings ===
Pos	Team	Pld	W	D	L	GF	GA	GD	Pts	Qualification
1	SC Tavriya Simferopol	30	16	10	4	43	20	+23	42	
2	FC Shakhtar Kadiyevka	30	17	7	6	38	22	+16	41	
3	FC Hirnyk Kryvyi Rih	30	16	7	7	44	22	+22	39	
4	SCF Sevastopol	30	14	6	10	45	28	+17	34	
5	FC Shakhtar Horlivka	30	12	10	8	31	28	+3	34	
6	FC Khimik Sieverodonetsk	30	11	9	10	34	30	+4	31	
7	FC Trubnik Nikopol	30	7	14	9	23	23	0	28	
8	FC Lokomotyv Donetsk	30	11	6	13	32	39	−7	28	
9	FC Industria Yenakiyeve	30	10	8	12	20	35	−15	28	Withdrew
10	FC Avanhard Kramatorsk	30	8	11	11	27	32	−5	27	
11	FC Komunarets Komunarsk	30	12	3	15	31	36	−5	27	
12	FC Metalurh Kerch	30	7	13	10	14	19	−5	27	
13	FC Torpedo Kharkiv	30	8	10	12	19	26	−7	26	
14	FC Burevisnyk Melitopol	30	7	11	12	28	34	−6	25	
15	FC Azovstal Zhdanov	30	5	12	13	19	33	−14	22	Withdrew
16	FC Dniprovets Dniprodzerzhynsk	30	4	13	13	19	40	−21	21	

== Second stage ==
This season play-off featured a mini League format. The two successive ranking teams from one group were put together in group with the other two teams from other two groups of equal rank. For example, the first two placed teams of each group played off between themselves for the final ranking. Teams from Belarus and Moldova did not participate at this stage.

=== Places 1–6 ===
Pos	Team	Pld	W	D	L	GF	GA	GD	Pts
1	FC Lokomotyv Vinnytsia	10	7	3	0	14	3	+11	17
2	SKA Kyiv	10	8	0	2	15	8	+7	16
3	FC Polissya Zhytomyr	10	4	3	3	9	7	+2	11
4	SC Tavriya Simferopol	10	2	2	6	11	18	−7	6
5	FC Shakhtar Kadiyevka	10	2	2	6	8	17	−9	6
6	SKA Lviv	10	2	0	8	12	16	−4	4

=== Places 7–12 ===
Pos	Team	Pld	W	D	L	GF	GA	GD	Pts
7	FC Kolhospnyk Poltava	10	7	1	2	13	10	+3	15
8	FC Hirnyk Kryvyi Rih	10	6	2	2	15	7	+8	14
9	FC Verkhovyna Uzhhorod	10	4	2	4	17	19	−2	10
10	FC Temp Kyiv	10	3	2	5	13	13	0	8
11	SCF Sevastopol	10	3	1	6	11	16	−5	7
12	FC Zirka Kirovohrad	10	2	2	6	9	16	−7	6

=== Places 13–18 ===
Pos	Team	Pld	W	D	L	GF	GA	GD	Pts
13	FC Dynamo Khmelnytskyi	10	5	2	3	14	10	+4	12
14	FC Shakhtar Horlivka	10	5	2	3	11	12	−1	12
15	FC Kolhospnyk Cherkasy	10	4	3	3	8	6	+2	11
16	FC Sudnobudivnyk Mykolaiv	10	4	3	3	12	9	+3	11
17	FC Khimik Severodonetsk	10	3	2	5	10	13	−3	8
18	FC Avanhard Ternopil	10	1	4	5	8	13	−5	6

=== Places 19–24 ===
Results are not certain

Pos	Team	Pld	W	D	L	GF	GA	GD	Pts
19	FC Naftovyk Drohobych	0	–	–	–	–	–	—	0
20	FC Chaika Balaklava	0	–	–	–	–	–	—	0
21	FC Avanhard Rivno	0	–	–	–	–	–	—	0
22	FC Budivelnyk Kherson	0	–	–	–	–	–	—	0
23	FC Lokomotyv Donetsk	0	–	–	–	–	–	—	0
24	FC Trubnyk Nikopol	0	–	–	–	–	–	—	0

=== Places 25–30 ===
Pos	Team	Pld	W	D	L	GF	GA	GD	Pts
25	FC Desna Chernihiv	10	4	5	1	15	8	+7	13
26	FC Avanhard Kramatorsk	10	5	2	3	17	12	+5	12
27	FC Spartak Ivano-Frankivsk	10	5	2	3	12	9	+3	12
28	FC Avanhard Chernivtsi	10	4	2	4	14	15	−1	10
29	FC Dunayets Izmayil	10	3	2	5	11	16	−5	8
30	FC Industriya Yenakievo	10	2	1	7	7	16	−9	5

=== Places 31–36 ===
Pos	Team	Pld	W	D	L	GF	GA	GD	Pts
31	FC Shakhtar Oleksandriya	10	5	3	2	12	5	+7	13
32	FC Avanhard Zhovti Vody	10	4	3	3	7	5	+2	11
33	FC Metalurh Kerch	10	3	4	3	6	8	−2	10
34	FC Spartak Sumy	10	3	3	4	11	12	−1	9
35	FC Komunarets Komunarsk	10	3	3	4	8	10	−2	9
36	FC Volyn Lutsk	10	1	6	3	6	10	−4	8

=== Places 37–41 ===
Pos	Team	Pld	W	D	L	GF	GA	GD	Pts
37	FC Dniprovets Dniprodzerzhynsk	8	5	2	1	10	4	+6	12
38	FC Torpedo Kharkiv	8	4	3	1	11	6	+5	11
39	FC Burevisnyk Melitopol	8	4	1	3	13	7	+6	9
40	FC Azovstal Zhdanov	8	1	2	5	7	15	−8	4
41	FC Dnipro Kremenchuk	8	1	2	5	4	13	−9	4

== Relegation playoffs ==
Team 1	Agg.	Team 2	1st leg	2nd leg	Replay
Lokmotyv Smila	4 – 7	Kolhospnyk Cherkasy	2–4	2–3	–
Temp Kyiv	2 – 0	Bilshovyk Kyiv	2–0	0–0	–
Taksomotor Odesa	6 – 3	Dunayets Izmail	4–2	2–1	–
Budivelnyk Kherson	2 – 0	Enerhiya Nova Kakhovka	0–0	0–0	2–0
Burevisnyk Melitopol	3 – 1	Strila Zaporizhia	2–1	1–0	–
Spartak Ivano-Frankivsk	4 – 2	Naftovyk Dolyna	0–1	4–1	–
Shakhtar Oleksandriya	8 – 0	SGUR Dymytrov	2–0	6–0	–
Spartak Sumy	12 – 0	Elektron Romny	11–0	1–0	–
Volyn Lutsk	7 – 2	Shakhtar Novovolynsk	7–1	0–1	–
Sudnobudivnyk Mykolaiv	3 – 2	Vympel Mykolaiv	1–1	2–1	–
Torpedo Kharkiv	4 – 0	Kolhospnyk Derhachi	3–0	1–0	–
Dynamo Khmelnytskyi	5 – 2	Podillia Kamianets-Podilskyi	2–0	3–2	–

Notes:

- In the tie Lokomotyv Smila vs Kolhospnyk Cherkasy, both legs took place in Smila.
- In the tie Shakhtar Oleksandriya vs SGUR Dymytrov, both legs took place in Oleksandriya.

== See also ==
- Soviet Second League
