= 1944 in Soviet football =

Football in the Soviet Union
- Season: 1944

Men's football
- Soviet Cup: Zenit Leningrad

The 1944 Soviet football championship was the 12th season of competitive football in the Soviet Union. The season consisted of a short Olympic-style (elimination) tournament played in August.

== Honours ==
Competition	Winner	Runner-up
Soviet Cup	Zenit Leningrad (1)	CDKA Moscow

Notes = Number in parentheses is the times that club has won that honour. * indicates new record for competition

== Soviet Cup ==
Zenit Leningrad beat CDKA Moscow 2–1 in the Soviet Cup final. The decisive goal was scored by Sergei Salnikov.

== Republican level ==
Football competitions of union republics

=== Football championships ===
- Azerbaijan SSR – Lokomotiv Baku
- Armenian SSR –
- Belarusian SSR – (see Football Championship of the Belarusian SSR)
- Estonian SSR –
- Georgian SSR –
- Kazakh SSR –
- Karelo-Finish SSR –
- Kirgiz SSR –
- Latvian SSR –
- Lithuanian SSR –
- Moldavian SSR –
- Russian SFSR – none
- Tajik SSR –
- Turkmen SSR – none
- Uzbek SSR – none
- Ukrainian SSR – (see Football Championship of the Ukrainian SSR)

=== Football cups ===
- Azerbaijan SSR – none
- Armenian SSR –
- Belarusian SSR –
- Estonian SSR –
- Georgian SSR – Dinamo Sukhumi
- Kazakh SSR –
- Karelo-Finish SSR –
- Kirgiz SSR –
- Latvian SSR –
- Lithuanian SSR –
- Moldavian SSR –
- Russian SFSR – none
- Tajik SSR –
- Turkmen SSR – Lokomotiv Ashkhabad
- Uzbek SSR – KhTU Chirchik
- Ukrainian SSR – FC Dynamo Kyiv (see 1944 Cup of the Ukrainian SSR)
