= 1964 in Soviet football =

Football in the Soviet Union
- Season: 1964

Men's football
- Class A 1. Group: Dinamo Tbilisi
- Class A 2. Group: Lokomotiv Moscow
- Class B: Rostselmash Rostov-na-Donu (Russia); Lokomotiv Vinnitsa (Ukraine); Granitas Klapeida (Union republics)
- Soviet Cup: Dinamo Kiev

The 1964 Soviet football championship was the 32nd seasons of competitive football in the Soviet Union and the 26th among teams of sports societies and factories. Dinamo Tbilisi won the championship becoming the Soviet domestic champions for the first time.

== Honours ==
Competition	Winner	Runner-up
Class A 1. Group	Dinamo Tbilisi (1)	Torpedo Moscow
Class A 2. Group	Lokomotiv Moscow (2*)	SKA Odessa
Class B	Rostselmash Rostov-na-Donu (Russia)	Terek Groznyi (Russia)
Class B	Lokomotiv Vinnitsa (Ukraine)	SKA Kiev (Ukraine)
Class B	Granitas Klapeida (Union republics)	Vostok Ust-Kamenogorsk (Union republics)
Soviet Cup	Dinamo Kiev (2)	Krylia Sovetov Kuibyshev

Notes = Number in parentheses is the times that club has won that honour. * indicates new record for competition

== Soviet Union football championship ==
=== Class A First Group ===
Pos	Team	Pld	W	D	L	GF	GA	GD	Pts	Qualification
1	(Georgian Soviet Socialist Republic) Dinamo Tbilisi (C)	32	18	10	4	48	30	+18	46	League champions
2	(Russian Soviet Federative Socialist Republic) Torpedo Moscow	32	19	8	5	52	19	+33	46	
3	(Russian Soviet Federative Socialist Republic) CSKA Moscow	32	16	11	5	49	23	+26	43	
4	(Russian Soviet Federative Socialist Republic) SKA Rostov-on-Don	32	16	6	10	40	28	+12	38	
5	(Ukrainian Soviet Socialist Republic) Shakhtyor Donetsk	32	13	11	8	35	26	+9	37	
6	(Ukrainian Soviet Socialist Republic) Dinamo Kiev	32	10	16	6	42	29	+13	36	Qualification for Cup Winners' Cup first round
7	(Russian Soviet Federative Socialist Republic) Dinamo Moscow	32	12	10	10	33	31	+2	34	
8	(Russian Soviet Federative Socialist Republic) Spartak Moscow	32	12	8	12	34	32	+2	32	
9	(Byelorussian Soviet Socialist Republic) Dinamo Minsk	32	7	17	8	24	21	+3	31	
10	(Russian Soviet Federative Socialist Republic) Krylya Sovetov Kuybyshev	32	7	14	11	24	35	−11	28	
11	(Russian Soviet Federative Socialist Republic) Zenit Leningrad	32	9	9	14	30	35	−5	27	
12	(Azerbaijan Soviet Socialist Republic) Neftyanik Baku	32	8	11	13	25	30	−5	27	
13	(Georgian Soviet Socialist Republic) Torpedo Kutaisi	32	10	7	15	20	37	−17	27	
14	(Russian Soviet Federative Socialist Republic) Volga Gorky (R)	32	7	13	12	19	38	−19	27	Relegation to Class A Second Group
15	(Kazakh Soviet Socialist Republic) Kairat Alma-Ata (R)	32	8	10	14	23	27	−4	26	Relegation to Class A Second Group
16	(Russian Soviet Federative Socialist Republic) Shinnik Yaroslavl (R)	32	6	9	17	20	48	−28	21	Relegation to Class A Second Group
17	(Moldavian Soviet Socialist Republic) Moldova Chisinau (R)	32	6	6	20	15	44	−29	18	Relegation to Class A Second Group

Source: rsssf.com
(C) Champions; (R) Relegated

=== Class A Second Group ===
==== For places 1-14 ====
Pos	Rep	Team	Pld	W	D	L	GF	GA	GD	Pts	Promotion
1	RUS	Lokomotiv Moskva	26	13	9	4	32	23	+9	35	Promoted
2	UKR	SKA Odessa	26	10	13	3	27	19	+8	33	Promoted
3	UZB	Pahtakor Tashkent	26	10	11	5	31	20	+11	31	Promoted
4	UKR	Chernomorets Odessa	26	12	7	7	36	28	+8	31	Promoted
5	LTU	Žalgiris Vilnius	26	9	11	6	33	28	+5	29	
6	UKR	Avangard Kharkov	26	9	8	9	32	27	+5	26	
7	ARM	Ararat Yerevan	26	9	8	9	26	23	+3	26	
8	RUS	Lokomotiv Chelyabinsk	26	8	9	9	22	22	0	25	
9	GEO	Lokomotiv Tbilisi	26	7	10	9	30	30	0	24	
10	UKR	Karpaty Lvov	26	8	8	10	29	36	−7	24	
11	UKR	Zarya Lugansk	26	6	11	9	16	18	−2	23	
12	RUS	Trud Voronezh	26	5	11	10	15	29	−14	21	
13	LVA	Daugava Riga	26	5	10	11	22	30	−8	20	
14	KAZ	Shakhtyor Karaganda	26	3	10	13	15	33	−18	16	

==== For places 15-27 ====
Pos	Rep	Team	Pld	W	D	L	GF	GA	GD	Pts
15	RUS	Kuban Krasnodar	38	14	14	10	33	24	+9	42
16	RUS	Traktor Volgograd	38	14	13	11	35	35	0	41
17	UKR	Metallurg Zaporozhye	38	11	17	10	35	25	+10	39
18	RUS	Dinamo Leningrad	38	14	10	14	46	41	+5	38
19	RUS	SKA Novosibirsk	38	13	12	13	33	34	−1	38
20	RUS	UralMash Sverdlovsk	38	15	8	15	38	43	−5	38
21	TKM	Stroitel Ashkhabad	38	12	12	14	44	51	−7	36
22	UKR	Dnepr Dnepropetrovsk	38	12	11	15	35	41	−6	35
23	EST	Dinamo Tallinn	38	11	9	18	33	39	−6	31
24	RUS	Volga Kalinin	38	9	12	17	30	45	−15	30
25	BLR	Lokomotiv Gomel	38	6	15	17	19	37	−18	27
26	TJK	Energetik Dushanbe	38	8	8	22	25	59	−34	24
27	KGZ	Alga Frunze	38	6	12	20	32	66	−34	24

Source: rsssf.com

=== Class B ===
==== Russian Federation finals ====
[Nov 9–17, Orjonikidze]

Pos	Team	Pld	W	D	L	GF	GA	GD	Pts
1	RostSelMash Rostov-na-Donu	3	2	0	1	4	6	−2	4
1	Terek Grozny	3	1	2	0	6	2	+4	4
3	Textilshchik Ivanovo	3	1	1	1	2	1	+1	3
4	Spartak Orjonikidze	3	0	1	2	2	5	−3	1

Additional final

RostSelMash Rostov-na-Donu  2-0  Terek Grozny

==== Ukraine (playoffs) ====
This season to the Ukrainian zone were added four teams from Belarus and three teams from Moldova. SKA Odessa did not participate as it gained its promotion last season. Two other newcomers were added: FC Chayka Balaklava and FC Dunayets Izmail.

This season play-off featured a mini League format. The two successive ranking teams from one group were put together in group with the other two teams from other two groups of equal rank. For example, the first two placed teams of each group played off between themselves for the final ranking. Teams from Belarus and Moldova did not participate at this stage.

===== Second stage for places 1-6 =====
Pos	Team	Pld	W	D	L	GF	GA	GD	Pts
1	Lokomotiv Vinnitsa	10	7	3	0	14	3	+11	17
2	SKA Kiev	10	8	0	2	15	8	+7	16
3	Polesye Zhitomir	10	4	3	3	9	7	+2	11
4	Tavria Simferopol	10	2	2	6	11	18	−7	6
5	Shakhtyor Kadiyevka	10	2	2	6	8	17	−9	6
6	SKA Lvov	10	2	0	8	12	16	−4	4

===== Second stage for places 7-12 =====
Pos	Team	Pld	W	D	L	GF	GA	GD	Pts
7	Kolhospnik Poltava	10	7	2	1	16	8	+8	14 (Note: 2 points deducted?)
8	Gornyak Krivoi Rog	10	5	3	2	10	5	+5	13
9	Verkhovina Uzhgorod	10	4	2	4	17	19	−2	10
10	Temp Kiev	10	3	2	5	13	13	0	8
11	SKF Sevastopol	10	3	1	6	11	16	−5	7
12	Zvezda Kirovograd	10	2	2	6	9	16	−7	6

Source: rsssf.com

==== Union republics finals ====
[Oct 18–28, Klaipeda]

Pos	Rep	Team	Pld	W	D	L	GF	GA	GD	Pts
1	LTU	Granitas Klaipeda	4	3	0	1	7	2	+5	6
1	KAZ	Vostok Ust-Kamenogorsk	4	3	0	1	5	3	+2	6
3	UZB	Politotdel Tashkent Region	4	2	1	1	5	7	−2	5
4	GEO	Dinamo Batumi	4	1	1	2	1	2	−1	3
5	BLR	Spartak Brest	4	0	0	4	2	6	−4	0

Source: rsssf.com

Additional final

[Nov 1, Kaliningrad]
Granitas Klaipeda  2-0 Vostok Ust-Kamenogorsk

=== Top goalscorers ===
Class A First Group

- Vladimir Fedotov (CSKA Moscow) – 16 goals
