= Zaporizhzhia Oblast Football Association =

The Oblast's coat of arms

Zaporizhzhia Oblast Football Association is a football governing body in the region of Zaporizhzhia Oblast, Ukraine. The association is a member of the Ukrainian Association of Football.

== Presidents ==
- 2009–present Viktor Mezheiko

== Previous Champions ==
- 1939 FC Lokomotyv Zaporizhzhia (1)
- 1940 FC Lokomotyv Zaporizhzhia (2)
- 1941–44 World War II
- 1945 FC Lokomotyv Zaporizhzhia (3)
- 1946 FC Bilshovyk Zaporizhzhia (1)
- 1947 FC Torpedo Osypenko (1)
- 1948 FC Torpedo Osypenko (2)
- 1949 FC Stal Zaporizhzhia (1)
- 1950 FC Metalurh Zaporizhya (2)
- 1951 FC Strila Zaporizhzhia (1)
- 1952 FC Mashynobudivnyk Zaporizhzhia (1)
- 1953 FC Mashynobudivnyk Zaporizhzhia (2)
- 1954 FC Mashynobudivnyk Zaporizhzhia (3)
- 1955 FC Mashynobudivnyk Zaporizhzhia (4)
- 1956 FC Burevisnyk Melitopol (1)
- 1957 FC Burevisnyk Melitopol (2)
- 1958 FC Avanhard Velykyi Tokmak (1)
- 1959 FC Mashynobudivnyk Zaporizhzhia (5)
- 1960 FC Burevisnyk Melitopol (3)
- 1961 FC Burevisnyk Melitopol (4)
- 1962 FC Azovets Berdyansk (1)
- 1963 FC Strila Zaporizhzhia (2)
- 1964 FC Strila Zaporizhzhia (3)
- 1965 FC Strila Zaporizhzhia (4)
- 1966 FC Strila Zaporizhzhia (5)
- 1967 FC Tytan Zaporizhzhia (1)
- 1968 FC Meteor Zaporizhzhia (1)
- 1969 FC Torpedo Melitopol (1)
- 1970 FC Tytan Zaporizhzhia (2)
- 1971 FC Tytan Zaporizhzhia (3)
- 1972 FC Hirnyk Dniprorudne (1)
- 1973 FC Hirnyk Dniprorudne (2)
- 1974 FC Komunar Zaporizhzhia (1)
- 1975 FC Transformator Zaporizhzhia (1)
- 1976 FC Transformator Zaporizhzhia (2)
- 1977 FC Tytan Zaporizhzhia (4)
- 1978 FC Start Zaporizhzhia (1)
- 1979 FC Start Zaporizhzhia (2)
- 1980 FC Tytan Zaporizhzhia (5)
- 1981 FC Start Zaporizhzhia (3)
- 1982 FC Hirnyk Dniprorudne (3)
- 1983 FC Khimik Zaporizhzhia (1)
- 1984 FC Torpedo Melitopol (2)
- 1985 FC Krystal Zaporizhzhia (1)
- 1986 FC Transformator Zaporizhzhia (3)
- 1987 FC Torpedo Berdyansk (3)
- 1988 FC Enerhiya Berdyansk (1)
- 1989 FC Transformator Zaporizhzhia (4)
- 1990 FC Metalurh Zaporizhzhia (3)
- 1991 FC Orbita Zaporizhzhia (1)
- =independence of Ukraine=
- 1992 FC Torpedo Melitopol (3)
- 1992–93 FC Viktor Zaporizhia (1)
- 1993–94
- 1994–95 FC ZAlK Zaporizhzhia (1)
- 1995–96
- 1996–97 FC ZAlK Zaporizhzhia (2)
- 1997–98 FC ZAlK Zaporizhzhia (3)
- 1998–99 FC ZAlK Zaporizhzhia (4)
- 1999 FC ZAlK Zaporizhzhia (5)
- 2000 FC ZAlK Zaporizhzhia (6)
- 2001 FC Roza Vitriv Hulyaipole (1)
- 2002 FC ZAlK Zaporizhzhia (7)
- 2003 FC ZAlK Zaporizhzhia (8)
- 2004 FC ZIGMU-Spartak Zaporizhzhia (2)
- 2005 FC Petrivka Petrivske (1)
- 2006 FC Dynamo Zaporizhzhia (1)
- 2007 FC Illich-Osypenko (1)
- 2008 FC Illich-Osypenko (2)
- 2009 FC Illich-Osypenko (3)
- 2010 FC Motor Zaporizhzhia (6)
- 2011 FC Melitopolska chereshnya (1)
- 2012 FC Motor-Sich Zaporizhzhia (7)
- 2013 FC Melitopolska chereshnya (2)
- =Russo-Ukrainian War=
- 2014 FC Tavria-Skif Rozdol (1)
- 2015 FC Tavria-Skif Rozdol (2)
- 2016 FC Tavria-Skif Rozdol (3)
- 2017 FC Tavria-Skif Rozdol (4)
- 2018 FC Motor Zaporizhzhia (8)
- 2019 FC Motor Zaporizhzhia (9)
- 2020 FC Motor Zaporizhzhia (10)
- 2021 FC Motor Zaporizhzhia (11)
- 2022 full-scale Russian invasion, partial occupation

=== Top winners ===
- 11 – FC Motor Sich (Strila) Zaporizhzhia
- 8 – FC ZAlK Zaporizhzhia
- 5 – FC Mashynobudivnyk Zaporizhzhia
- 5 – FC Tytan Zaporizhzhia
- 4 – 3 clubs (Transformator, Burevisnyk M., Tavria-Skif)
- 3 – 7 clubs (Illich-Osypenko, Torpedo M., Hirnyk D., Start, Lokomotyv, Torpedo B., Metalurh/Metalurh-2)
- 2 – 3 clubs
- 1 – 13 clubs

== Professional clubs ==
- FC Bolshevik Zaporizhia, 1947 (a season)
- FC Lokomotiv Zaporizhia, 1948, 1949 (2 seasons)
- FC Metalurh Zaporizhia, 1953–2018 (56 seasons)
  - FC Metalurh-2 Zaporizhzhia, 1998–2012 (14 seasons)
  - SSSOR-Metalurh Zaporizhzhia, 2000–2001 (a season)
- FC Spartak Melitopol (Burevestnik, Lyman), 1963–1966 (4 seasons)
- FC Torpedo Berdiansk, 1966–1970 (5 seasons)
- FC Kolos Yakymivka, 1968, 1969 (2 seasons)
- FC Torpedo Zaporizhia, 1985–2003 (19 seasons)

- FC Druzhba Berdiansk, 1992–1996 (5 seasons)
- SC Olkom Melitopol (Torpedo), 1992–2011 (20 seasons)
- FC Viktor Zaporizhia, 1993–2000 (7 seasons)
- FC Metalurh Zaporizhia, 2018– (7 seasons)
  - FC Metalurh-2 Zaporizhzhia, 2022–2024 (2 seasons)

== Other clubs at national/republican level ==
Note: the list includes clubs that played at republican competitions before 1959 and the amateur or KFK competitions after 1964.

- Zaporizhia, 1936, 1955
- Melitopol, 1936–1938
- Berdiansk, 1937, 1938
- Kryla Rad Zaporizhia, 1937–1939
- Lokomotyv Zaporizhia, 1939, 1940, 1947, 1948, 1950–1952
- Bilshovyk Zaporizhia, 1946
- Torpedo Osypenko, 1948, 1957
- Stal/Metalurh Zaporizhia, 1948, 1950–1952
- Sudnobudivnyk Velykyi Tokmak, 1948, 1949
- Mashynobudivnyk Melitopol, 1948
- Burevisnyk Zaporizhia, 1948
- Trudovi Rezervy Melitopol, 1949
- Traktor Osypenko, 1949
- Enerhia Zaporizhia, 1949
- Mashynobudivnyk Zaporizhia, 1953, 1954, 1956–1959
- Enerhia Osypenko, 1955, 1956
- Khimik Zaporizhia, 1955
- Kolhospnyk Melitopol, 1957
- Avanhard Velykyi Tokmak, 1958, 1959
- Budivelnyk Zaporizhzhia, 1958, 1959
- Burevisnyk Melitopol, 1958, 1959
- Avanhard Berdiansk, 1958, 1959
- Strila Zaporizhzhia, 1964 – 1966, 1972, 1974, 1975
- Tytan Zaporizhzhia, 1967, 1968, 1970, 1971
- Meteor Zaporizhzhia, 1969
- Torpedo Melitopol, 1970, 1985 – 1991
- Torpedo Berdiansk, 1971, 1988, 1990
- Hirnyk Dniprorudne, 1972, 1973
- Iskra Zaporizhzhia, 1973
- Komunar Zaporizhzhia, 1975
- Azovets Berdiansk, 1975, 1977, 1978
- Transformator Zaporizhzhia, 1976 – 1983, 1985, 1987, 1990
- Enerhia Berdiansk, 1979, 1980, 1989, 1991 – 1993/94, 1995/96
- Spartak Melitopol, 1979
- Avtomobilist Zaporizhzhia, 1980, 1981, 1983
- Azovkabel Berdiansk, 1981
- Avanhard Zaporizhzhia, 1982
- Torpedo Zaporizhzhia, 1983, 1984
- Khimik Zaporizhzhia, 1984
- Krystal Zaporizhzhia, 1986
- Olimpiets Prymorsk, 1988 – 1991
- Druzhba Osypenko, 1991
- Dyzelist Tokmak, 1991, 1992/93
- Nyva-Viktor Novomykolaivka, 1993/94
- Zirka Zaporizhzhia, 1994/95
- Blyskavka Berdiansk, 1996/97
- Tavria-Metalurh Prymorsk, 1996/97
- Dalis Kamyshuvakha, 1997/98
- ZAlK Zaporizhzhia, 2000 – 2003, 2005
- ZIDMU Zaporizhzhia, 2004, 2005
- Illich Osypenko, 2008
- Tavria-Skif Rozdol, 2015 – 2017/18
- Metalurh Zaporizhzhia, 2016
- Metalurh Zaporizhzhia/Metalurh-2, 2017/18, 2020/21, 2021/22
- Motor Zaporizhzhia, 2018/19 – 2022/23
- OSDYuShOR Zaporizhzhia, 2021/22

== See also ==
- FFU Council of Regions
