= 1966 Ukrainian Class B =

Football Championship of Ukrainian SSR
- Season: 1966
- Champions: FC Avanhard Zhovti Vody
- Promoted: FC Avanhard Zhovti Vody
- Relegated: FC Spartak Melitopol; FC Avtomobilist Odesa (both withdrew)

The 1966 Football Championship of Ukrainian SSR (Class B) was the 36th season of association football competition of the Ukrainian SSR, which was part of the Ukrainian Class B. It was the sixteenth in the Soviet Class B and the fourth season of the Ukrainian Class B.

The 1966 Football Championship of Ukrainian SSR (Class B) was won by FC Avanhard Zhovti Vody.

== Zone 1 ==
=== Location map ===
Locations of teams in Class B

=== Relegated teams ===
- none

=== Promoted teams ===
- FC Avanhard Makiivka
- FC Start Dzerzhynsk – (champion of Donetsk Oblast)

=== Relocated and renamed teams ===
- SKCF Sevastopol was renamed from SKF Sevastopol
- FC Kryvbas Kryvyi Rih was renamed from FC Hirnyk Kryvyi Rih (not to be confused with another FC Hirnyk Kryvyi Rih)

=== Final standings ===
Pos	Team	Pld	W	D	L	GF	GA	GD	Pts	Qualification
1	FC Dynamo Khmelnytskyi	38	24	6	8	62	26	+36	54	
2	FC Desna Chernihiv	38	19	11	8	56	36	+20	49	
3	SKCF Sevastopol	38	18	12	8	57	34	+23	48	
4	FC Lokomotyv Donetsk	38	19	9	10	52	33	+19	47	
5	FC Kolos Poltava	38	14	14	10	50	32	+18	42	
6	FC Shakhtar Kadiivka	38	16	10	12	43	41	+2	42	
7	FC Kryvbas Kryvyi Rih	38	16	9	13	39	28	+11	41	
8	FC Shakhtar Oleksandriya	38	12	17	9	30	25	+5	41	
9	FC Avanhard Kramatorsk	38	16	8	14	49	49	0	40	
10	FC Polissya Zhytomyr	38	14	11	13	33	27	+6	39	
11	FC Kolhospnyk Rivne	38	11	17	10	27	30	−3	39	
12	FC Volyn Lutsk	38	14	10	14	39	38	+1	38	
13	FC Trubnyk Nikopol	38	11	15	12	39	44	−5	37	
14	FC Dunayets Izmail	38	13	10	15	42	48	−6	36	
15	FC Avanhard Makiivka	38	17	1	20	48	44	+4	35	
16	FC Naftovyk Drohobych	38	12	10	16	42	49	−7	34	
17	FC Spartak Melitopol	38	9	10	19	39	54	−15	28	Withdrew
18	FC Komunarets Komunarsk	38	8	12	18	42	62	−20	28	
19	FC Avtomobilist Odesa	38	4	13	21	23	65	−42	21	Withdrew
20	FC Start Dzerzhynsk	38	6	9	23	25	72	−47	21	

== Zone 2 ==
=== Location map ===
Locations of teams in Class B

=== Relegated teams ===
- none

=== Promoted teams ===
- FC Torpedo Berdyansk
- FC Azovets Zhdanov

=== Relocated and renamed teams ===
- FC Chayka Sevastopol relocated from Balaklava (at that time a separate city)

=== Final standings ===
Pos	Team	Pld	W	D	L	GF	GA	GD	Pts
1	FC Avanhard Zhovti Vody	38	23	9	6	61	24	+37	55
2	FC Lokomotyv Kherson	38	20	10	8	55	30	+25	50
3	FC Dnipro Kremenchuk	38	19	12	7	44	26	+18	50
4	FC Spartak Ivano-Frankivsk	38	14	16	8	40	29	+11	44
5	FC Chayka Sevastopol	38	15	14	9	40	29	+11	44
6	FC Khimik Sievierodonetsk	38	16	11	11	55	34	+21	43
7	FC Shakhtar Horlivka	38	15	13	10	44	27	+17	43
8	FC Torpedo Kharkiv	38	14	13	11	39	32	+7	41
9	FC Spartak Sumy	38	11	17	10	31	28	+3	39
10	FC Bukovyna Chernivtsi	38	12	14	12	45	48	−3	38
11	FC Avanhard Kerch	38	13	11	14	41	42	−1	37
12	FC Kolhospnyk Cherkasy	38	11	14	13	24	31	−7	36
13	FC Dniprovets Dniprodzerzhynsk	38	12	9	17	38	41	−3	33
14	FC Avanhard Ternopil	38	10	12	16	40	44	−4	32
15	FC Torpedo Berdyansk	38	11	10	17	25	39	−14	32
16	FC Azovets Zhdanov	38	11	9	18	43	63	−20	31
17	FC Verkhovyna Uzhhorod	38	12	7	19	38	58	−20	31
18	FC Shakhtar Torez	38	7	15	16	34	52	−18	29
19	FC Shakhtar Yenakieve	38	10	8	20	29	58	−29	28
20	FC Shakhtar Krasnyi Luch	38	7	10	21	18	49	−31	24

== Post season playoffs (the season's final ranking) ==
#	Club			G	W	D	L	Gls	Pts
1	FC Avanhard Zhovti Vody		0:0	2	0	2	0	1–1	2
2	FC Dynamo Khmelnytskyi	1:1		2	0	2	0	1-1	2
3	FC Lokomotyv Kherson		2:0	2	1	1	0	2–0	3
4	FC Desna Chernihiv	0:0		2	0	1	1	0–2	1
5	SKCF Sevastopol		3:0	2	1	1	0	4–1	3
6	FC Dnipro Kremenchuk	1:1		2	0	1	1	1–4	1
7	FC Chayka Sevastopol		1:0	2	1	1	0	3–2	3
8	FC Lokomotyv Donetsk	2:2		2	0	1	1	2–3	1
9	FC Spartak Ivano-Frankivsk		3:0	2	2	0	0	5–1	4
10	FC Kolos Poltava	1:2		2	0	0	2	1–5	0
11	FC Khimik Severodonetsk		4:2	2	1	0	1	6–5	2
12	FC Shakhtar Kadiivka	3:2		2	1	0	1	5–6	2
13	FC Shakhtar Horlivka		3:2	2	1	1	0	3–2	3
14	FC Kryvbas Kryvyi Rih	0:0		2	0	1	1	2–3	1
15	FC Torpedo Kharkiv		2:0	2	2	0	0	3–0	4
16	FC Shakhtar Oleksandriya	0:1		2	0	0	2	0–3	0
17	FC Avanhard Kramatorsk		4:0	2	2	0	0	5–0	4
18	FC Spartak Sumy	0:1		2	0	0	2	0–5	0
19	FC Bukovyna Chernivtsi		3:2	2	1	1	0	4–3	3
20	FC Polissya Zhytomyr	1:1		2	0	1	1	3–4	1
21	FC Kolhospnyk Rivne		+:-	1	0	0	0	0-0	2
22	FC Avanhard Kerch			1	0	0	1	0-0	0
23	FC Volyn Lutsk		+:-	1	0	0	0	0-0	2
24	FC Kolhospnyk Cherkasy			1	0	0	1	0-0	0
25	FC Trubnyk Nikopol		3:0	2	1	1	0	3–0	3
26	FC Dniprovets Dniprodzerzhynsk	0:0		2	0	1	1	0–3	1
27	FC Avanhard Ternopil		2:0	2	1	0	1	2–1	2
28	FC Dunayets Izmail	1:0		2	1	0	1	1–2	2
29	FC Avanhard Makiivka		3:0	2	1	0	1	3–1	2
30	FC Torpedo Berdyansk	1:0		2	1	0	1	1–3	2
31	FC Naftovyk Drohobych		3:0	2	1	1	0	4–1	3
32	FC Azovets Zhdanov	1:1		2	0	1	1	1–4	1
33	FC Spartak Melitopol		+:-	1	1	0	0	0-0	2
34	FC Verkhovyna Uzhhorod			1	0	0	1	0-0	0
35	FC Shakhtar Torez		2:1	2	1	1	0	3–2	3
36	FC Komunarets Komunarsk	1:1		2	0	1	1	2–3	1
37	FC Shakhtar Yenakieve		+:-	1	1	0	0	0-0	2
38	FC Avtomobilist Odesa			1	0	0	1	0-0	0
39	FC Shakhtar Krasnyi Luch		1:1	2	1	1	0	2–1	3
40	FC Start Dzerzhynsk	0:1		2	0	1	1	1–2	1

== See also ==
- Soviet Second League
