= Republican football championships in the Soviet Union =

Soviet football competition system

The Republican football championships in the Soviet Union were part of the Soviet football league pyramid located at about 4th-5th tiers. Those championships were part of the competitions among "collectives of physical culture" (KFK) which was a conditional status of amateur footballers in the Soviet Union. In contrast to the "KFK competitions" there were competitions among "teams of masters" which were competitions in higher 1-3 tiers.

The competitions were established in each of the union republics and had intermediate level among regional competitions (lower) and all-union competitions (higher). Throughout its history in the Soviet Union were 16 union republics.

Some bigger republics were honoring its "teams of masters" competing at the third tier, Soviet Second League, among which it were Russian SFSR, Ukrainian SSR, Kazakh SSR as well as some inter-republican competitions such as "Central Asia" (dominated by Uzbek teams) and "Union republics" (teams other than from Central Asia, Russia and Ukraine). Aside of them, each union republic conducted at least one single or double tier republican competitions among "collectives of physical culture" (KFK).

The relegation and promotion among republican competitions and the Soviet Second League or the Soviet third tier competitions were conditional.

== List of competitions ==
- Football Championship of the Armenian SSR
- Football Championship of the Azerbaijan SSR
- Football Championship of the Belarusian SSR
- Football Championship of the Estonian SSR
- Football Championship of the Georgian SSR
- Football Championship of the Karelo-Finish SSR
- Football Championship of the Kazakh SSR
- Football Championship of the Kyrgyz SSR
- Football Championship of the Latvian SSR
- Football Championship of the Lithuanian SSR
- Football Championship of the Moldavian SSR
- Football Championship of the Russian SFSR
- Football Championship of the Tajik SSR
- Football Championship of the Turkmen SSR
- Football Championship of the Ukrainian SSR
- Football Championship of the Uzbek SSR
