= Hennadii Rudynskyi =

Soviet football coach (born 1921)

- Rudynskyi in 1972

Personal information
- Full name: Hennadii Vasyliovych Rudynskyi
- Date of birth: 1921
- Date of death: death date unknown

Senior career*
Years	Team	Apps	(Gls)
1949–1953	Traktor Kirovohrad		

Managerial career
- 1958: Avanhard Kriukiv
- 1959: Zirka Kirovohrad
- 1966: Zirka Kirovohrad
- * Club domestic league appearances and goals

Hennadii Rudynskyi (Ukrainian: Геннадій Васильович Рудинський, Russian: Геннадий Васильевич Рудинский; born 1921 – death date unknown) was a Soviet professional footballer and coach.

== Playing career ==
Rudynskyi played for Zirka Kirovohrad where he was a captain. In 1953 he won the Football Cup of the Ukrainian SSR. In 1958 while managing Avanhard he played in a Kremenchuk combined team that faced Poltava combined team.

== Coaching career ==
=== Avanhard ===
Rudynskyi was managing Avanhard Kriukiv who played in 1958 Football Championship of the Ukrainian SSR.

=== Zirka ===
By 1961 he was a coach with Zirka Kirovohrad. He remained there until 1964.

=== Dnipro ===
In 1964 he joined Dnipro Kremenchuk as an assistant to Mykola Melnychenko. He was in Kremenchuk for two years.

=== Return to Zirka ===
Next season Rudynskyi returned to manage Zirka Kirovohrad. Yanchukov and Berezan list him as a manager for two seasons. Zirka club history page only lists him as a manager for 1966. He was a manager when he returned to face Dnipro in a friendly match on 16 November 1967. He then became a coach for Zirka. In 1968 he poached two best players from Dnipro: Viktor Stupak and Yurii Holdin. He also became a Nachalnik Komandy in 1970 and remained in position until 1972. From 1974 to 1976 he was an assistant director at the club, responsible for organizing all club activities. When he was not coaching anymore he quickly died at an unknown date.

== Honours ==
=== Players ===
Traktor Kirovohrad

- Football Cup of the Ukrainian SSR: 1953

== Sources ==
- Pyrukhin, Yurii (n.d.a), Днепр Кременчуг футбол 1963–1969 [Dnipro Kremenchuk football 1963–1969] (in Ukrainian), Kremenchuk
- Pyrukhin, Yurii (n.d.b), Энциклопедия кременчугского футбола [Encyclopedia of Kremenchuk football] (in Russian), Kremenchuk
- Yanchukov, Stanislav; Berezan, Oleksandr (2015), До спортивних вершин. [To the sports peaks.] (in Ukrainian), Kirovohrad: LLC Central-Ukrainian publishing house, ISBN 978-966-130-082-7
