= 2019 Football Championship of Zaporizhzhia Oblast =

Football Championship of Zaporizhzhia Oblast
- Season: 2019
- Champions: Motor Zaporizhzhia

The 2019 Football Championship of Zaporizhzhia Oblast was won by Motor Zaporizhzhia.

== League table ==
Pos	Team	Pld	W	D	L	GF	GA	GD	Pts
1	Motor Zaporizhzhia (C)	20	18	1	1	108	8	+100	55
2	Tavria-Skif Rozdol	20	16	2	2	78	21	+57	50
3	Portovyk Mariupol	20	11	1	8	32	36	−4	34
4	Melitopolska chereshnia Melitopol	20	6	1	13	27	53	−26	19
5	Ahro Kom 1990 Polohy	20	3	1	16	17	76	−59	10
6	FC Berdiansk	20	3	0	17	15	83	−68	9

Source: "Чемпионат Запорожской области 2019 Высшая лига". Footballfacts.ru.
(C) Champions
