= FC Tavria-Skif Rozdol =

Tavria-Skif
- Full name: FC Tavria-Skif Rozdol
- Founded: 1995
- Ground: Tavria-Skif Stadium, Rozdol
- Chairman: (Ukraine) Oleh Kaliman
- Head coach: (Ukraine) Maksym Skorokhodov
- Website: http://fc-tavriy-skif.at.ua/

FC Tavria-Skif Rozdol (Ukrainian: Футбольний Клуб Таврія-Скіф) is an amateur Ukrainian football from Rozdol, Mykhailivka Raion. The club is owned by an agriculture company Tavria-Skif.

== History ==
The club was created in 1995. In 2015 more than half of the senior team was composed of former the Metalurh Zaporizhia football academy players.

== Honours ==
- Ukrainian Football Amateur League
  - Runners-up (1): 2017–18
- Zaporizhia Oblast Championship
  - Winners (4): 2014, 2015, 2016, 2017
  - Runners-up (1): 2012
- Zaporizhia Oblast Cup
  - Winners (2): 2015, 2016

== Head coaches ==
- 2013-???? Oleksiy Oliynyk
- ????- Maksym Skorokhodov
