= Ukrainian Danube Shipping Company =

Ukrainian shipper

- Company type: PJSC
- Industry: Maritime transport
- Founded: 1944
- Headquarters: Izmail, Odesa Oblast, Ukraine
- Area served: Ukraine
- Website: udp.one

Ukrainian Danube Shipping Company (Ukrainian: Українське Дунайське пароплавство) is a Ukrainian shipping company that specializes in water transportation along the Danube and Black Sea.

The company is based out of the city of Izmail, Odesa Oblast.

== History ==
The history of the Ukrainian Danube Shipping Company (UDP or PJSC "UDP") dates back to the end of World War II. In August 1944, the city of Izmail was liberated from the German occupation and the Soviet government tasked the leadership of the Black Sea Shipping Company to ensure the transport of military units and supplies along the Danube River. In October of the same year, the Soviet government signed a decree establishing the Soviet Danube Shipping Company (SDSC) with its headquarters in Izmail. The new company was faced with many challenges, including the reconstruction of the fleet, modernization, and personnel issues.

In the post-war years, the SDSC underwent a series of transformations, including the renovation and modernization of the fleet. The 1950s and 1960s saw the construction of 75 new tugboats and pushers, and in the 1970s and 1980s, the company added powerful pushers such as the "Sergey Avdeenkov", "Zaporozhye", and "Leningrad". Additionally, the non-self-propelled fleet was rapidly replenished with the construction of bulk and dry cargo barges in the Kiliya ship repair plant, as well as on the shipyards of Austria, Romania, and Bulgaria. By the 1990s, the SDSC had more than 1300 ships, including self-propelled and non-self-propelled vessels.

In the 1990s, the SDSC, like many other Soviet-era state-owned enterprises, underwent significant changes. The economic crisis of the 1990s affected the shipping industry as well, resulting in a decline in demand for shipping services. The company was renamed to Ukrainian Danube Shipping Company (UDP) in 1996. The UDP faced numerous challenges in the post-Soviet period, including difficulties with the implementation of new economic mechanisms, the deterioration of the fleet, and the shortage of qualified personnel.

In 2013, the Ukrainian government initiated a large-scale reform of the UDP, aimed at improving the company's efficiency and competitiveness. The reform plan included measures to modernize the fleet, improve the working conditions of employees, and optimize the management structure. However, the company faced further challenges due to the conflict in eastern Ukraine and the annexation of Crimea by the Russian Federation in 2014. Despite these difficulties, the UDP continues to operate, serving as a key transportation link between Ukraine, Moldova, Romania, and other countries in the region.

UDP has also faced significant challenges since the start of the Russian invasion of Ukraine. Despite the difficult circumstances, UDP managed to survive and continue operating its fleet of ships, with a focus on transporting grain along the Danube River. The company has also been working on various projects to increase efficiency and reduce costs, such as a fuel monitoring system and a potential new grain loading facility on their unused property. Looking forward, UDP's key goals include improving their corporate structure, digitizing their management processes, and launching new projects to strengthen the company's position. Overall, while facing significant obstacles, UDP remains a viable and strategic transportation option for Ukraine.

== Management ==
The Ukrainian Danube Shipping Company (UDP) has been managed by several leaders throughout its history.

1. Oleksiy Fyodorovych Techiv (1986-1997) was the first chief of the Soviet and later the Ukrainian Danube Shipping Company, serving in various leadership roles for over a decade. He was responsible for the company during the challenging transition from the Soviet era to Ukrainian independence.
2. Petro Semenovych Suvorov (1997-2007) was the head of the company for ten years. During his tenure, he oversaw transformation of the company into a joint-stock company.
3. Oleg Mykolayovych Titamir (2007-2010, 2014) served as the acting head of the company for brief periods before and after his stint as the director general.
4. Yevhen Serhiyovych Samoshyn (2008) took over as the acting head of the company after Oleg Titamir's first tenure, eventually being appointed as the chairman of the board of directors.
5. Vadym Volodymyrovych Sukhonenko (2008-2010) served as the acting head of the company during a transitional period, after which he was succeeded by Yuriy Fedorovych Rozvozchyk.
6. Yuriy Fedorovych Rozvozchyk (2010-2011) was appointed as the acting head of the company before being named the chairman of the board of directors in 2010, a role he held until 2011.
7. Alexander Petrovych Dolgov (2011-2014) served as the acting head of the company for two and a half years, followed by his appointment as the chairman of the board of directors.
8. Dmitriy Anatolyevich Barinov (2014-2017) succeeded Dolgov and served as the chairman of the board of directors for three years.
9. Dmitriy Serhiyovych Chalyi (2017-2019) served as the acting head of the company before being appointed as the chairman of the board of directors.
10. Oleksiy Valeriyovych Khomyakov (2019-2021) served as the acting head of the company before being replaced by Pavlo Dmytrovych Yatsenko.
11. Pavlo Dmytrovych Yatsenko (2021-2022) served as the temporary acting head of the company before being replaced by Dmytro Olehovych Moskalenko.
12. Dmytro Olehovych Moskalenko is the current head of UDP, having taken on the role in March 2022.

== Passenger fleet ==
The passenger fleet of PJSC "UDP" includes 4 comfortable passenger vessels - the "Volga" and "Dnipro" riverboats, built in 1970, as well as the "Moldova" and "Ukraine" built in 1979 at the Austrian shipyard of Korneuburg for the international cruise line "From the Alps to the Black Sea". In the early 90s, a separate structural unit "Transcruise" was created in the Ukrainian Danube Shipping Company to prepare and implement a set of measures to attract foreign tourists to the Danube. Since 1991, the updated "From the Alps to the Black Sea" cruise line has been functioning and is still in operation.

All PJSC "UDP" passenger vessels are fully equipped with air conditioning, have four decks, a restaurant, a music salon with panoramic views, a cozy open-air bar, a large sun deck, a heated pool, sunshades, loungers for all tourists, a library, a sauna, a massage room, a hairdresser, and a satellite TV viewing room.

The PJSC "UDP" cruise ships are positioned in the European market of river cruises in the "Upper Middle Class" category. The riverboats have gained popularity among European tourists, chartered by reputable German tour operators, such as "Seetours", "Transocean", "Phoenix Reisen", "Nicko cruises", and others.

The passenger riverboats of PJSC "UDP" are in demand among European tourists, primarily due to the coordinated work of friendly and attentive Ukrainian crews, who hospitably take care of the comfortable stay of tourists on board the vessel and ensure safe travel.

During the cruise, tourists are offered a variety of entertainment and excursion programs, performances by folk groups, a crew concert, and the skill of high-class chefs who amaze with the variety of dishes from the Danube region. All this leaves unforgettable impressions in the memory of each tourist and the desire to return again.

The cruise program includes visits to European capitals such as Vienna, Bratislava, Budapest, Belgrade, Bucharest, as well as a journey to the Ukrainian Danube delta to the "zero kilometer".

== River fleet ==
The river fleet of PJSC "Ukrainian Danube Shipping Company" consists of:

- river barges of various types with a cargo capacity of 1000 to 2300 tons;
- river tugboats-pushboats with a total main engine power of 1050 to 3000 hp;
- self-propelled dry cargo ships with a cargo capacity of 1814 tons (total main engine power is 2100 hp, also used for pushing barge formations).

In total, the river fleet of the company includes 75 self-propelled ships and 245 units of non-self-propelled fleet.

PJSC "UDP" also operates a fleet of foreign joint ventures, which includes 125 units of non-self-propelled fleet.

The river fleet of PJSC "Ukrainian Danube Shipping Company" provides transportation of:

- iron ore raw materials;
- coal and coke;
- grain cargoes;
- metals and various general cargoes;
- bulk and packaged fertilizers;
- third-grade petroleum products;
- machinery and equipment;
- wheeled vehicles;
- containerized cargoes;
- oversized and heavy cargoes.

River transportation is provided by PJSC "UDP" fleet on the entire navigable section of the Danube River from the ports of Ust-Dunaysk (Ukraine) and Constanta (Romania) to the port of Kelheim (Germany) and in the opposite direction.

The weight of the cargo in the formations being pushed during their movement upstream against the current reaches 13,000 tons, and downstream with the current - 7,000-8,500 tons.

In addition to the Danube transportation, the river fleet of PJSC "UDP" provides transportation of oversized and heavy cargoes by sea, in mixed "river-sea" connection, and from the Mediterranean basin to the Caspian.

These transportation are provided by specialized pontoons "TMI-4" and four pontoons of the "PDM-10" type.

These pontoons are designed to transport oversized and heavy cargoes, wheeled vehicles, trailers, and containers from the port of departure to the port of destination.

The pontoons are equipped with a power plant, anchor equipment, running lights, a sea towing bridle, automation that provides ballasting and navigation safety. Loading operations are carried out by vertical and horizontal loading and unloading, as well as by rolling and strapping.

== Maritime Fleet ==
Currently, the maritime fleet of PJSC "UDP" consists of 7 dry cargo vessels with a deadweight of 3300 to 4050 tons. These are six "Izmail" type dry cargo vessels and one "Desna" vessel for liquid cargoes.

The vessels can transport various cargoes in the areas of the Black, Azov, and Mediterranean seas, and can enter ports of the Danube and Dnieper rivers.

The company offers a series of specialized vessels of the "Izmail" type, built at shipyards in Viana do Castelo (Portugal), which ensures fast, integrated, and uninterrupted delivery of cargoes, including in containers.

The two large cargo holds, tweendecks, and various fittings on these vessels allow for the transportation of general, packaged cargoes, containers, metal, cars, oversized equipment, and bulk grain.

The maritime vessels of the fleet are under the supervision of the Ukrainian Shipping Register.

== Training Center ==
The Training Center of PJSC "UDP" was founded in 1989 based on the Izmail Maritime School and the Danube Shipping Company Training Center. It is a separate structural unit of the company.

The main task of the Training Center is to provide high-quality training for maritime and river specialists for PJSC "UDP" and other shipping companies, in accordance with the requirements of the STCW-78/95, SOLAS-74/88, MARPOL-73/78 International Conventions, as well as the requirements of the Danube Commission.

The Training Center is part of the UDP's management system for the safe operation of vessels (complying with MKUB) and the shipping quality system (complying with the national standard DSTU ISO 9001:2015).

The Training Center is staffed by highly qualified personnel with extensive experience working in the industry. It has a modern training and methodological base for the high-quality training of specialists in various fields.

== Budapest Building ==
UDP owns a building located on the embankment in Budapest, Hungary, which has been the center of a legal battle for over a decade. The building was originally acquired by UDP during the Soviet era, and after the collapse of the Soviet Union, the company's title to the property was questioned. In 2006, UDP agreed to sell the building to Intelcom Kft, a Hungarian private company, for $8 million, but the sale was never completed as the money never arrived in UDP's account. Therefore, the title to the building remained with UDP, however, legal disputes continued, putting UDP's title to the building at risk.

In March 2022, shortly after the start of the Russian invasion of Ukraine, an attempt was made to take control of the building with the assistance of Bokotey Janos, the director of General Agency of UDP in Hungary. Bokotey amended the purchase agreement to allow for the registration of ownership rights to the building to the buyer. However, the UDP's Hungarian lawyer revealed the deal to the Ukrainian management, and the UDP deployed armed guards to regain control of the premises.

It was revealed that Pavlo Yatsenko's predecessor had transferred the property to Transhold Kft, making it impossible to complete the sale to Intelcom. The final beneficiary owner of Transhold Kft is UDP, and the transfer to Transhold Kft could have saved the building from Intelcom with a possibility to eventually regain the building by UDP. However, the position of UDP changed after the appointment of Pavlo Yatsenko as the head of UDP and Konstantin Kostyuchenko as the director of Transhold Kft, a legal owner of the building at that moment. Kostyuchenko consulted a legal opinion from Intelcom's lawyers that suggested the transfer to Transhold Kft was not legally appropriate, and the property should be returned to the General Agency of UDP. Following the legal opinion, Yatsenko and Kostyuchenko decided to return the building to the Hungarian agency of UDP, which made the building vulnerable again, leading to the attempted takeover.

Bokotey Janos signed an additional agreement in March 2022, changing the procedural order for transferring the property, and a transfer of ownership act was signed. Kostyuchenko, as the director of Transhold Kft, entered into a new contract with Intelcom Kft as the "new owner" and began collecting rent for the "new owner". Fortunately, the lawyer who prepared the documents for the transfer of the building made a mistake, which gave the UDP time to stop the registration process.

Both Kostyuchenko and Bokotey were dismissed from their positions. Despite the attempt to take control of the building, the UDP is determined to defend the property and retain ownership.
