= Mykola Melnychenko (football manager) =

Soviet coach (born 1919)

Personal information
- Full name: Mykola Pavlovych Melnychenko
- Date of birth: 1919
- Date of death: death date unknown

Managerial career
- Years: Team
- 1964–1965: Dnipro Kremenchuk

Mykola Melnychenko (Ukrainian: Микола Павлович Мельниченко, Russian: Николай Павлович Мельниченко; born 1919 – death date unknown) was a Soviet professional football coach.

== Coaching career ==
=== Dynamo ===
In 1949 Dynamo Kyiv football school was founded. Melnychenko became one of its coaches along with Mykola Fominykh. He was a coach there during 1950s. In 1957 the school was merged into newly formed Dynamo Kyiv junior squads and Academy. In the 1960 youth championships, Dynamo team coached by Melnychenko became champions.

=== Dnipro ===
Melnychenko joined Dnipro Kremenchuk in 1964, his assistant was Hryhorii Miroshnyk. Before the start of the 1965 season he wrote in Avtobydivnyk newspaper that in 1964 season team under performed and new season began earlier to rectify those problems. Team finished the season in last place in their group, next year they finished fifth in group and sixteenth overall.

== Legacy ==
During his career Melnychenko trained the following players: Anatoliy Byshovets.

== Sources ==
- Pyrukhin, Yurii (n.d.a), Днепр Кременчуг футбол 1963–1969 [Dnipro Kremenchuk football 1963–1969] (in Ukrainian), Kremenchuk
- Pyrukhin, Yurii (n.d.b), Энциклопедия кременчугского футбола [Encyclopedia of Kremenchuk football] (in Russian), Kremenchuk
