= 1944 Cup of the Ukrainian SSR =

The 1944 Ukrainian Cup was a football knockout competition conducting by the Football Federation of the Ukrainian SSR and was known as the Ukrainian Cup.

== Competition schedule ==
=== First elimination round ===
The main date for games was on 10 September 1944.

Spartak Lviv	1:2	Dynamo Lviv	(played on 5 September)
Dynamo Voroshylovhrad	6:4	Traktor Kharkiv
Stal Mariupol	+/-	VCh Voroshylovhrad	(no show or forfeit)
Sudnobudivnyk Mykolaiv	5:2	Vodnyk Kherson
Silmash Kirovohrad	1:11	Dynamo Odesa
Stal Dnipropetrovsk	+/-	Avanhard Druzhkivka	(no show or forfeit)
Stal Kryvyi Rih	1:4	Zavod imeni Libknekhta Dnipropetrovsk
Spartak Poltava	1:5	Dynamo Kyiv
Spartak Zhytomyr	3:0	Spartak Kyiv
Dynamo Sumy	2:3	Dynamo Kharkiv
Lokomotyv Zaporizhia	+/-	Spartak Dnipropetrovsk	(no show or forfeit, sometime in September)
Stal Dniprodzerzhynsk	+/-	Dynamo Dnipropetrovsk	(no show or forfeit, sometime in September)
Stal Kostiantynivka	+/-	Zenit Stalino	(no show or forfeit, sometime in September)
Stal Voroshylovsk	?:?	Lokomotyv Yasynuvata	(no data, sometime in September)
Lokomotyv Artemivsk	?:?	Stal Makiivka	(no data, sometime in September)

=== Second elimination round ===
The main date for games was on 17 September 1944.

Lokomotyv Zaporizhia	5:2	Stal Dniprodzerzhynsk
Stal Mariupol	1:7	Lokomotyv Kharkiv
Spartak Zhytomyr	0:8	Dynamo Kyiv
Dynamo Voroshylovhrad	+/-	Stal Kostiantynivka	(no show or forfeit)

=== Third elimination round ===
Dynamo Kyiv	3:1	Stal Dnipropetrovsk	(played on 24 September)
Dynamo Odesa	+/-	Sudnobudivnyk Mykolaiv	(no show or forfeit, on 24 September)
Dynamo Lviv	0:1	Dynamo Kyiv	(played on 25 September)
Lokomotyv Kharkiv	11:0	Dynamo Voroshylovhrad	(played on 25 September)
Dynamo Kharkiv	0:1	Lokomotyv Zaporizhia	(played on 26 September)

=== Fourth elimination round ===
The main date for games was on 1 October 1944.

Dynamo Odesa	4:2	Dynamo Kyiv
Dynamo Chernivtsi	2:5	Stakhanovets Stalino
Lokomotyv Kharkiv	+/-	Lokomotyv Zaporizhia	(no show or forfeit)

=== Final group ===
All games were played in Kyiv in October 8 through 15, 1944.

Dynamo Kyiv	2:0	Dynamo Odesa	(played on 8 October)
Stakhanovets Stalino	2:2	Lokomotyv Kharkiv	(played in October)
Dynamo Kyiv	1:0	Lokomotyv Kharkiv	(played on 11 October)
Dynamo Odesa	1:0	Stakhanovets Stalino	(played in October)
Dynamo Kyiv	1:0	Stakhanovets Stalino	(played on 14 October)
Lokomotyv Kharkiv	2:0	Dynamo Odesa	(played on 15 October)

Pos	Team	Pld	W	D	L	GF	GA	GD	Pts	Qualification	DKY	LOK	DOD	SHA
1	Dynamo Kyiv (C)	3	3	0	0	4	0	+4	6	Tournament winner	—	1–0	2–0	1–0
2	Lokomotyv Kharkiv	3	1	1	1	4	3	+1	3			—	2–0	2–2
3	Dynamo Odesa	3	1	0	2	1	4	−3	2				—	1–0
4	Stakhanovets Stalino	3	0	1	2	2	4	−2	1					—

(C) Champions

== Top goalscorers ==
Scorer	Goals	Team
(Ukrainian Soviet Socialist Republic)	?	

Ukrainian Cup 1944 Winners

FC Mashynobudivnyk Kyiv
Second title

== See also ==
- Soviet Cup
- Ukrainian Cup
