= Viktor Stupak =

Ukrainian footballer (born 1943)

Personal information
- Full name: Viktor Hryhorovych Stupak
- Date of birth: 17 January 1943 (age 83)
- Place of birth: Kremenchuk, Ukraine
- Position: Forward

Senior career*
Years	Team	Apps	(Gls)
1962–1963	Avanhard Kriukiv	?	(?)
1963–1966	Dnipro Kremenchuk	95	(30)
1967–1973	Zirka Kirovohrad	269	(62)
- * Club domestic league appearances and goals

Viktor Stupak (Ukrainian: Віктор Григорович Ступак; born 17 January 1943) is a retired Ukrainian professional footballer who played as a forward. He played for Avanhard Kriukiv, Dnipro Kremenchuk and Zirka Kirovohrad.

== Club career ==
=== Avanhard Kriukiv ===
Stupak played for Avanhard Kriukiv in Kremenchuk during the 1962 seasons. He wore the number 9 shirt. On 16 July 1963 he played in a friendly against Dnipro Kremenchuk.

=== Dnipro Kremenchuk ===
He moved to the same city club Dnipro Kremenchuk. First known game for him was on 11 August 1963. In his first season he played in at least seven games scoring three goals. Next season he was highest goalscorer for the team and he featured in thirty-one game including cup games. In 1965 he played in thirty-five games and scored eight goals. During his last season he played in thirty-four matches and scored fifteen goals. He left in spring 1967.

=== Zirka Kirovohrad ===
In 1968 it was revealed that former Dnipro and current Zirka coach Hennadii Rudynskyi poached two best players from Dnipro: Viktor Stupak and Yurii Holdin.

He was the top scorer for Zirka in 1969 with twelve goals, 1970 with nine goals and twelve in 1972. Stupak was the first Zirka player to lift Football Cup of the Ukrainian SSR trophy.

== Honours ==
Zirka Kirovohrad

- Football Cup of the Ukrainian SSR: 1973

== Sources ==
- Pyrukhin, Yurii (n.d.a), Днепр Кременчуг футбол 1963-1969 [Dnipro Kremenchuk football 1963-1969] (in Ukrainian), Kremenchuk
- Pyrukhin, Yurii (n.d.b), Энциклопедия кременчугского футбола [Encyclopedia of Kremenchuk football] (in Russian), Kremenchuk
