= FC Stroyindustria Bălți =

Former professional football club based in Bălți, Moldova

FC Stroyindustria Bălți was a Moldovan amateur football club from Bălți.

It was established in 1957. In 1962 they finished second in Football Championship of the Moldavian SSR. Next year they took part in Soviet Cup. Made their professional debut in 1963 Soviet Class B Union republics Zone 1. The team competed as a professional club in Football Championship of the Ukrainian SSR between 1964 and 1965. After 1965 season, club finished participation in Professional league and remained in Moldavian SSR Championship and Cup until 1973.

== Name change ==
- 1957 – 1965 Stroitel Bălţi
- 1966 Stroyindustria Bălți
- 1967 – 1973 Stroitel Bălţi

== Sources ==
- Kazakov, Yevgeniy (2019), История чемпионатов СССР по футболу [The history of the USSR football championships] (in Russian), vol. 1 (1936-1969), Izdatelskiye Resheniya, ISBN 978-5-0050-7970-1
