= 1964 Soviet Cup =

1964 Cup of USSR in Football
Кубок СССР

Tournament details
- Country: Soviet Union
- Dates: April 16 – September 27
- Teams: 52 (final stage)

Final positions
- Champions: Dinamo Kiev
- Runners-up: Krylya Sovetov Kuybyshev

The 1964 Soviet Cup was an association football cup competition of the Soviet Union. The winner of the competition, Dinamo Kiev qualified for the continental tournament for the first time among all Soviet clubs.

== Participating teams ==
Enter in Final round		Enter in Qualification round		
Class A		Class B 151/151 teams		
Group 1 17/17 teams ✓ Dinamo Tbilisi; ✓ Torpedo Moscow; ✓ CSKA Moscow; ✓ SKA Rostov-na-Donu; ✓ Shakhter Donetsk; ✓ Dinamo Kiev; ✓ Dinamo Moscow; ✓ Spartak Moscow; ✓ Dinamo Minsk; ✓ Krylya Sovetov Kuibyshev; ✓ Zenit Leningrad; ✓ Neftianik Baku; ✓ Torpedo Kutaisi; ✓ Volga Gorkiy; ✓ Kairat Alma-Ata; ✓ Shinnik Yaroslavl; ✓ Moldova Kishenev	Group 2 26/27 teams ✓ SKA Odessa; ✓ Zhalgiris Vilnius; ✓ Lokomotiv Moscow; ✓ Lokomotiv Chelyabinsk; ✓ Pakhtakor Tashkent; ✓ Avangard Kharkov; ✓ Chernomorets Odessa; ✓ Ararat Yerevan; ✓ Karpaty Lvov; ✓ Zorya Lugansk; ✓ Shakhter Karaganda; ✓ Trud Voronezh; ✓ Lokomotiv Tbilisi; ✓ Daugava Riga; ✓ Kuban Krasnodar; ✓ Traktor Volgograd; ✓ Metallurg Zaporozhye; ✓ Dinamo Leningrad; ✓ SKA Novosibirsk; ✓ Uralmash Sverdlovsk; ✓ Stroitel Ashkhabad; ✓ Dnepr Dnepropetrovsk; ✓ Dinamo Tallinn; ✓ Volga Kalinin; ✓ Energetik Dushanbe; ✓ Alga Frunze; ✗ Lokomotiv Gomel	RSFSR I ✓ Zvezda Serpukhov; ✓ Tekstilschik Ivanovo; ✓ Granitas Klaipeda; ✓ Avangard Kolomna; ✓ Khimik Novomoskovsk; ✓ Tekmash Kostroma; ✓ Metallurg Cherepovets; ✓ Dinamo Bryansk; ✓ Baltika Kaliningrad; ✓ Khimik Klin; ✓ Spartak Leningrad; ✓ Sputnik Kaluga; ✓ Zveinieks Liyepaya; ✓ Spartak Petrozavodsk; ✓ Tralflotovets Murmansk; ✓ Saturn Rybinsk; ✓ Spartak Smolensk	RSFSR II ✓ Znamia Truda Orekhovo-Zuyevo; ✓ Iskra Kazan; ✓ Spartak Ryazan; ✓ Khimik Dzerzhinsk; ✓ Traktor Vladimir; ✓ Zvezda Perm; ✓ Zenit Izhevsk; ✓ Trud Noginsk; ✓ Spartak Saransk; ✓ Dinamo Kirov; ✓ Serp i Molot Moscow; ✓ Metallurg Tula; ✓ Spartak Yoshkar-Ola; ✓ Volga Ulyanovsk; ✓ Torpedo Pavlovo; ✓ Khimik Berezniki; ✓ Progress Zelenodolsk	RSFSR III ✓ Rostselmash Rostov-na-Donu; ✓ Trudovye Rezervy Kursk; ✓ Progress Kamensk-Shaktinskiy; ✓ Spartak Belgorod; ✓ Sokol Saratov; ✓ Torpedo Taganrog; ✓ Torpedo Armavir; ✓ Volgar Astrakhan; ✓ Energiya Volzhskiy; ✓ Spartak Tambov; ✓ Shakhter Shakhty; ✓ Spartak Oryol; ✓ Trud Penza; ✓ Torpedo Lipetsk; ✓ Metallurg Kuibyshev; ✓ Neftianik Syzran
Group 1 17/17 teams ✓ Dinamo Tbilisi; ✓ Torpedo Moscow; ✓ CSKA Moscow; ✓ SKA Rostov-na-Donu; ✓ Shakhter Donetsk; ✓ Dinamo Kiev; ✓ Dinamo Moscow; ✓ Spartak Moscow; ✓ Dinamo Minsk; ✓ Krylya Sovetov Kuibyshev; ✓ Zenit Leningrad; ✓ Neftianik Baku; ✓ Torpedo Kutaisi; ✓ Volga Gorkiy; ✓ Kairat Alma-Ata; ✓ Shinnik Yaroslavl; ✓ Moldova Kishenev		RSFSR IV ✓ Dinamo Batumi; ✓ Terek Grozny; ✓ Dinamo Kirovabad; ✓ Spartak Ordzhonikidze; ✓ Metallurg Rustavi; ✓ Spartak Nalchik; ✓ Dinamo Stavropol; ✓ Lori Kirovakan; ✓ Dinamo Sukhumi; ✓ Tsement Novorossiysk; ✓ Dinamo Makhachkala; ✓ Kolkhida Poti; ✓ Dinamo Baku; ✓ Trudovye Rezervy Kislovodsk; ✓ Alazani Gurdzhaani; ✓ Shirak Leninakan; ✓ Urozhai Maikop; ✓ Lernagorts Kafan	RSFSR V ✓ Uralets Nizhniy Tagil; ✓ Stroitel Ufa; ✓ Politodel Tashkent Oblast; ✓ Neftianik Fergana; ✓ Pamir Leninabad; ✓ Spartak Samarkand; ✓ Metallist Jambul; ✓ Metallurg Magnitogorsk; ✓ Khimik Chirchik; ✓ Dinamo Tselinograd; ✓ Torpedo Miass; ✓ Lokomotiv Orenburg; ✓ Metallurg Chimkent; ✓ Spartak Andizhan; ✓ Stroitel Kurgan; ✓ Priboy Tyumen; ✓ Salyut Kamensk-Uralskiy	RSFSR VI ✓ Temp Barnaul; ✓ Irtysh Omsk; ✓ Torpedo Tomsk; ✓ SKA Khabarovsk; ✓ Vostok Ust-Kamenogors; ✓ Luch Vladivostok; ✓ Avangard Komsomolsk-na-Amure; ✓ Start Angarsk; ✓ Lokomotiv Krasnoyarsk; ✓ Armeyets Ulan-Ude; ✓ Zabaikalets Chita; ✓ Torpedo Rubtsovsk; ✓ Amur Blagoveschensk; ✓ Khimik Kemerovo; ✓ Sibselmash Novosibirsk; ✓ Tsementnik Semipalatinsk; ✓ Shakhter Prokopyevsk; ✓ Angara Irkutsk
Group 1 17/17 teams ✓ Dinamo Tbilisi; ✓ Torpedo Moscow; ✓ CSKA Moscow; ✓ SKA Rostov-na-Donu; ✓ Shakhter Donetsk; ✓ Dinamo Kiev; ✓ Dinamo Moscow; ✓ Spartak Moscow; ✓ Dinamo Minsk; ✓ Krylya Sovetov Kuibyshev; ✓ Zenit Leningrad; ✓ Neftianik Baku; ✓ Torpedo Kutaisi; ✓ Volga Gorkiy; ✓ Kairat Alma-Ata; ✓ Shinnik Yaroslavl; ✓ Moldova Kishenev		UkrSSR I ✓ Polesie Zhitomir; ✓ SKA Lvov; ✓ Verkhovina Uzhgorod; ✓ Spartak Brest; ✓ Temp Kiev; ✓ Avangard Ternopol; ✓ Dinamo Khmelnitskiy; ✓ Spartak Mogilev; ✓ Kolgospnik Rovno; ✓ Neftianik Drogobich; ✓ Desna Chernigov; ✓ Spartak Ivano-Frankivsk; ✓ Volyn Lutsk; ✓ Dvina Vitebsk; ✓ Spartak Sumy; ✓ Neman Grodno	UkrSSR II ✓ SKA Kiev; ✓ Lokomotiv Vinnitsa; ✓ Zvezda Kirovograd; ✓ Kolgospnik Poltava; ✓ Kolgospnik Cherkassy; ✓ Sudostoitel Nikolayev; ✓ Chaika Balaklava; ✓ Stroitel Kherson; ✓ Nistrul Bendery; ✓ Stroitel Beltsy; ✓ Avangard Chernovtsy; ✓ Dunayets Izmail; ✓ Lucaferule Tiraspol; ✓ Avangard Zholtye Vody; ✓ Shakhter Aleksandria; ✓ Dnepr Kremenchuk	UkrSSR III ✓ Tavriya Simferopol; ✓ Shakhter Kadiyevka; ✓ Gornyak Krivoi Rog; ✓ SKF Sevastopol; ✓ Shakhter Gorlovka; ✓ Khimik Severodonetsk; ✓ Trubnik Nikopol; ✓ Lokomotiv Donetsk; ✓ Industriya Yenakievo; ✓ Avangard Kramatorsk; ✓ Kommunarets Kommunarsk; ✓ Metallurg Kerch; ✓ Torpedo Kharkov; ✓ Burevestnik Melitopol; ✓ Azovstal Zhdanov; ✓ Dneprovets Dneprodzerzhinsk

Source: []

== Competition schedule ==
=== Preliminary stage ===
==== Group 1 (Russian Federation) ====
===== Preliminary round =====
Khimik Novomoskovsk           1-2  SATURN Rybinsk

===== First round =====
Avangard Kolomna              0-1  DINAMO Bryansk  
Baltika Kaliningrad           1-2  TRALFLOTOVETS Murmansk 
GRANITAS Klaipeda             3-1  Metallurg Cherepovets 
KHIMIK Klin                   1-0  Textilshchik Ivanovo 
Saturn Rybinsk                1-4  TEKMASH Kostroma 
Spartak Smolensk              1-2  SPARTAK Petrozavodsk  
ZVEJNIEKS Liepaja             w/o  Spartak Leningrad 
ZVEZDA Serpukhov              2-1  Sputnik Kaluga

===== Quarterfinals =====
Dinamo Bryansk                1-1  Zvezda Serpukhov 
Khimik Klin                   1-2  TEKMASH Kostroma  
SPARTAK Petrozavodsk          1-0  Tralflotovets Murmansk 
Zvejnieks Liepaja             0-0  Granitas Klaipeda

====== Quarterfinals replays ======
Dinamo Bryansk                0-3  ZVEZDA Serpukhov 
Zvejnieks Liepaja             0-1  GRANITAS Klaipeda

===== Semifinals =====
GRANITAS Klaipeda             2-1  Spartak Petrozavodsk 
Zvezda Serpukhov              1-2  TEKMASH Kostroma

===== Final =====
Granitas Klaipeda             1-2  TEKMASH Kostroma

==== Group 2 (Russian Federation) ====
===== Preliminary round =====
SERP I MOLOT Moskva           3-0  Spartak Saransk

===== First round =====
METALLURG Tula                3-1  Zvezda Perm 
PROGRESS Zelyonodolsk         7-1  Volga Ulyanovsk 
Spartak Ryazan                0-1  DINAMO Kirov 
Spartak Yoshkar-Ola           0-3  SERP I MOLOT Moskva 
TORPEDO Pavlovo               1-0  Khimik Berezniki 
TRAKTOR Vladimir              4-1  Khimik Dzerzhinsk 
TRUD Noginsk                  3-2  Zenit Izhevsk 
ZNAMYA TRUDA Orekhovo-Zuyevo  4-1  Iskra Kazan

===== Quarterfinals =====
DINAMO Kirov                  3-1  Traktor Vladimir 
METALLURG Tula                1-0  Trud Noginsk 
Progress Zelyonodolsk         0-1  ZNAMYA TRUDA Orekhovo-Zuyevo 
SERP I MOLOT Moskva           4-1  Torpedo Pavlovo

===== Semifinals =====
METALLURG Tula                1-0  Serp i Molot Moskva 
ZNAMYA TRUDA Orekhovo-Zuyevo  4-0  Dinamo Kirov

===== Final =====
ZNAMYA TRUDA Orekhovo-Zuyevo  2-0  Metallurg Tula              [aet]

==== Group 3 (Russian Federation) ====
===== First round =====
ENERGIYA Volzhskiy            2-1  Metallurg Kuibyshev 
PROGRESS Kamensk              5-1  Neftyanik Syzran 
ROSTSELMASH Rostov-na-Donu    4-0  Torpedo Lipetsk 
Shakhtyor Shakhty             0-1  TRUD Penza 
Torpedo Armavir               0-0  Spartak Tambov 
TORPEDO Taganrog              2-0  Spartak Belgorod 
TRUDOVIYE REZERVY Kursk       3-0  Spartak Oryol 
VOLGAR Astrakhan              2-1  Sokol Saratov

====== First round replays ======
TORPEDO Armavir               2-0  Spartak Tambov

===== Quarterfinals =====
ENERGIYA Volzhskiy            2-1  Volgar Astrakhan 
ROSTSELMASH Rostov-na-Donu    3-1  Torpedo Armavir 
TRUD Penza                    0-1  Progress Kamensk  
Trudoviye Rezervy Kursk       0-0  Torpedo Taganrog

====== Quarterfinals replays ======
TRUDOVIYE REZERVY Kursk       5-1  Torpedo Taganrog

===== Semifinals =====
Trud Penza                    1-1  RostSelMash Rostov-na-Donu 
TRUDOVIYE REZERVY Kursk       1-0  Energiya Volzhskiy

====== Semifinals replays ======
Trud Penza                    1-1  RostSelMash Rostov-na-Donu 
Trud Penza                    2-2  ROSTSELMASH Rostov-na-Donu  [by draw]

===== Final =====
ROSTSELMASH Rostov-na-Donu    3-0  Trudoviye Rezervy Kursk

==== Group 4 (Russian Federation) ====
===== Preliminary round =====
ALAZANI Gurjaani              3-1  Dinamo Baku 
LORI Kirovakan                1-0  Lernagorts Kafan

===== First round =====
CEMENT Novorossiysk           2-1  Trudoviye Rezervy Kislovodsk 
DINAMO Batumi                 2-1  Metallurg Rustavi 
DINAMO Kirovabad              2-0  Alazani Gurjaani 
DINAMO Makhachkala            2-0  Spartak Nalchik 
DINAMO Sukhumi                3-1  Kolkhida Poti 
SHIRAK Leninakan              1-0  Lori Kirovakan 
Spartak Orjonikidze           1-2  DINAMO Stavropol 
TEREK Grozny                  4-0  Urozhai Maykop

===== Quarterfinals =====
DINAMO Batumi                 2-0  Shirak Leninakan 
DINAMO Stavropol              2-1  Dinamo Kirovabad 
DINAMO Sukhumi                2-1  Cement Novorossiysk 
TEREK Grozny                  3-0  Dinamo Makhachkala

===== Semifinals =====
DINAMO Sukhumi                1-0  Dinamo Batumi 
TEREK Grozny                  3-1  Dinamo Stavropol

===== Final =====
TEREK Grozny                  1-0  Dinamo Sukhumi

==== Group 5 (Russian Federation) ====
===== Preliminary round =====
Metallist Jambul              0-0  Dinamo Tselinograd

====== Preliminary round replays ======
Metallist Jambul              1-2  DINAMO Tselinograd

===== First round =====
Dinamo Tselinograd            0-0  Lokomotiv Orenburg  
Metallurg Chimkent            2-2  Stroitel Ufa 
NEFTYANIK Fergana             1-0  Metallurg Magnitogorsk 
Pamir Leninabad               0-0  Priboi Tyumen 
POLITOTDEL Tashkent Region    2-0  Torpedo Miass 
SALYUT Kamensk-Uralskiy       4-2  Khimik Chirchik 
SPARTAK Andizhan              3-2  Uralets Nizhniy Tagil 
SPARTAK Samarkand             1-0  Stroitel Kurgan

====== First round replays ======
Dinamo Tselinograd            0-2  LOKOMOTIV Orenburg 
METALLURG Chimkent            1-0  Stroitel Ufa 
PAMIR Leninabad               2-0  Priboi Tyumen

===== Quarterfinals =====
LOKOMOTIV Orenburg            2-1  Metallurg Chimkent 
NEFTYANIK Fergana             3-1  Spartak Andizhan 
PAMIR Leninabad               1-0  Spartak Samarkand 
POLITOTDEL Tashkent Region    3-1  Salyut Kamensk-Uralskiy

===== Semifinals =====
NEFTYANIK Fergana             2-1  Pamir Leninabad 
POLITOTDEL Tashkent Region    1-0  Lokomotiv Orenburg

===== Final =====
NEFTYANIK Fergana             1-0  Politotdel Tashkent Region

==== Group 6 (Russian Federation) ====
===== Preliminary round =====
Lokomotiv Krasnoyarsk         2-2  Armeyets Ulan-Ude 
Start Angarsk                 0-1  TEMP Barnaul

====== Preliminary round replays ======
LOKOMOTIV Krasnoyarsk         3-1  Armeyets Ulan-Ude

===== First round =====
AMUR Blagoveshchensk          2-0  Avangard Komsomolsk-na-Amure 
ANGARA Irkutsk                1-0  Zabaikalets Chita 
CEMENTNIK Semipalatinsk       1-0  SibSelMash Novosibirsk 
Irtysh Omsk                   2-2  Shakhtyor Prokopyevsk 
LOKOMOTIV Krasnoyarsk         2-0  Temp Barnaul 
LUCH Vladivostok              1-0  SKA Khabarovsk              [aet] 
Torpedo Rubtsovsk             2-2  Vostok Ust-Kamenogorsk 
TORPEDO Tomsk                 2-1  Khimik Kemerovo

====== First round replays ======
IRTYSH Omsk                   1-0  Shakhtyor Prokopyevsk 
TORPEDO Rubtsovsk             2-0  Vostok Ust-Kamenogorsk

===== Quarterfinals =====
CEMENTNIK Semipalatinsk       2-0  Torpedo Rubtsovsk 
IRTYSH Omsk                   2-0  Torpedo Tomsk 
LOKOMOTIV Krasnoyarsk         2-1  Angara Irkutsk 
LUCH Vladivostok              4-1  Amur Blagoveshchensk

===== Semifinals =====
CEMENTNIK Semipalatinsk       1-0  Irtysh Omsk 
LOKOMOTIV Krasnoyarsk         2-1  Luch Vladivostok

===== Final =====
LOKOMOTIV Krasnoyarsk         3-1  Cementnik Semipalatinsk

==== Group 1 (Ukraine) ====
===== First round =====
AVANGARD Ternopol             2-0  Volyn Lutsk 
DESNA Chernigov               1-0  Dvina Vitebsk 
KOLHOSPNIK Rovno              1-0  Spartak Brest 
POLESYE Zhitomir              1-0  Dinamo Khmelnitskiy 
SKA Lvov                      2-1  Spartak Mogilyov 
SPARTAK Ivano-Frankovsk       1-0  Neftyanik Drogobych 
SPARTAK Sumy                  2-1  Temp Kiev 
VERKHOVINA Uzhgorod           1-0  Neman Grodno

===== Quarterfinals =====
AVANGARD Ternopol             2-1  Kolhospnik Rovno 
DESNA Chernigov               w/o  Polesye Zhitomir 
SKA Lvov                      4-2  Verkhovina Uzhgorod 
SPARTAK Sumy                  3-0  Spartak Ivano-Frankovsk

===== Semifinals =====
DESNA Chernigov               4-1  Spartak Sumy 
SKA Lvov                      4-1  Avangard Ternopol

===== Final =====
SKA Lvov                      3-0  Desna Chernigov

==== Group 2 (Ukraine) ====
===== First round =====
AVANGARD Chernovtsy           3-1  Dnepr Kremenchug 
Avangard Zholtyye Vody        1-2  SKA Kiev  
DUNAYETS Izmail               w/o  Nistrul Bendery 
LOKOMOTIV Vinnitsa            3-2  Stroitel Beltsy 
Luchaferul Tiraspol           1-2  ZVEZDA Kirovograd  
Shakhtyor Alexandria          0-1  KOLHOSPNIK Cherkassy 
STROITEL Kherson              1-0  Kolhospnik Poltava 
Sudostroitel Nikolayev        0-1  CHAIKA Balaklava

===== Quarterfinals =====
CHAIKA Balaklava              1-0  Stroitel Kherson 
LOKOMOTIV Vinnitsa            3-1  Dunayets Izmail 
SKA Kiev                      3-0  Kolhospnik Cherkassy 
ZVEZDA Kirovograd             4-1  Avangard Chernovtsy

===== Semifinals =====
SKA Kiev                      4-0  Chaika Balaklava 
ZVEZDA Kirovograd             2-1  Lokomotiv Vinnitsa

===== Final =====
SKA Kiev                      2-0  Zvezda Kirovograd

==== Group 3 (Ukraine) ====
===== First round =====
AZOVSTAL Zhdanov              1-0  Avangard Kramatorsk 
GORNYAK Krivoi Rog            3-0  Metallurg Kerch 
KHIMIK Severodonetsk          1-0  Dneprovets Dneprodzerzhinsk 
Kommunarets Kommunarsk        0-1  SHAKHTYOR Kadiyevka  
LOKOMOTIV Donetsk             2-1  Shakhtyor Gorlovka 
SKF Sevastopol                4-1  Burevestnik Melitopol 
TAVRIA Simferopol             3-0  Industry Yenakiyevo 
Torpedo Kharkov               1-1  Trubnik Nikopol

====== First round replays ======
TORPEDO Kharkov               1-0  Trubnik Nikopol

===== Quarterfinals =====
GORNYAK Krivoi Rog            3-0  Lokomotiv Donetsk 
KHIMIK Severodonetsk          2-0  Torpedo Kharkov 
Shakhtyor Kadiyevka           3-4  SKF Sevastopol  
Tavria Simferopol             0-0  AzovStal Zhdanov

====== Quarterfinals replays ======
Tavria Simferopol             1-1  AzovStal Zhdanov 
TAVRIA Simferopol             2-1  AzovStal Zhdanov

===== Semifinals =====
GORNYAK Krivoi Rog            2-0  Khimik Severodonetsk 
SKF Sevastopol                5-2  Tavria Simferopol           [aet]

===== Final =====
SKF Sevastopol                2-0  Gornyak Krivoi Rog

=== Final stage ===
==== Preliminary round ====
[May 26] 
ALGA Frunze                   2-1  UralMash Sverdlovsk 
CHERNOMORETS Odessa           1-0  Dinamo Leningrad 
SKA Kiev                      0-1  KARPATY Lvov 
SKA Lvov                      2-0  Traktor Volgograd 
STROITEL Ashkhabad            2-1  Dinamo Tallinn

==== First round ====
[May 26] 
ENERGETIK Dushanbe            3-1  Daugava Riga 
  [K.Kuzyayev, R.Hamidov, S.Sultanov - ?] 
[May 27] 
SKA Odessa                    0-1  TRUD Voronezh 
  [V.Proskurin 45] 
[May 28] 
LOKOMOTIV Krasnoyarsk         1-0  Avangard Kharkov 
  [Anatoliy Sharygin 10] 
ZARYA Lugansk                 4-0  SKA Novosibirsk 
  [V.Petrov 45, Y.Priymak 50 pen, I.Balaba 65, M.Ivanov 90] 
[May 31] 
LOKOMOTIV Chelyabinsk         2-0  Shakhtyor Karaganda 
  [G.Yepishin, V.Korotayev] 
LOKOMOTIV Moskva              4-0  Lokomotiv Tbilisi           [aet] 
  [Valeriy Latyshev-2, Lev Gorshkov, Boris Oreshnikov] 
Neftyanik Fergana             1-1  Metallurg Zaporozhye 
SKA Lvov                      6-2  Dnepr Dnepropetrovsk 
  [Pfeiffer-2, Sekech, Puzach, Shandor, Batalin – Pivikov-2] 
SKF Sevastopol                2-1  Volga Kalinin 
TekMash Kostroma              0-1  ŽALGIRIS Vilnius 
TEREK Grozny                  5-2  Ararat Yerevan 
Znamya Truda Orekhovo-Zuyevo  0-2  KUBAN Krasnodar 
[Jun 1] 
KARPATY Lvov                  1-0  Stroitel Ashkhabad 
ROSTSELMASH Rostov-na-Donu    1-0  Pahtakor Tashkent 
  [Mosalyov] 
[Jun 2] 
CHERNOMORETS Odessa           2-0  Alga Frunze 
  [A.Koldakov, V.Deryabin]

===== First round replays =====
[Jun 1] 
NEFTYANIK Fergana             2-1  Metallurg Zaporozhye

==== Second round ====
[May 31] 
Trud Voronezh                 0-3  KAYRAT Alma-Ata 
  [Leonid Ostroushko, Vladimir Skulkin, Sergei Kvochkin] 
[Jun 3] 
Lokomotiv Krasnoyarsk         0-1  DINAMO Tbilisi 
  [Vladimir Barkaia 87] 
[Jun 4] 
Terek Grozny                  1-2  SHAKHTYOR Donetsk 
  [Dyachenko ? – Anatoliy Korshunov 35, Anatoliy Rodin 39] 
Zarya Lugansk                 1-2  KRYLYA SOVETOV Kuibyshev 
  [Ivanov 52 – Abdulmanov 4, Nikolai Osyanin 82] 
ŽALGIRIS Vilnius              1-0  Torpedo Moskva 
  [Leonardas Žukauskas 87] 
[Jun 5] 
Karpaty Lvov                  0-1  SHINNIK Yaroslavl 
  [V.Artemyev] 
LOKOMOTIV Chelyabinsk         3-2  Moldova Kishinev            [aet] 
  [V.Korotayev-2 (1 pen), G.Yepishin – Valeriy Kolbasyuk, Vladimir Tsinkler] 
RostSelMash Rostov-na-Donu    0-0  SKA Rostov-na-Donu  
[Jun 8] 
Chernomorets Odessa           0-1  ZENIT Leningrad 
  [Anatoliy Markov 64] 
Neftyanik Fergana             0-1  DINAMO Kiev 
  [Valeriy Verigin 70] 
SKF Sevastopol                1-0  Torpedo Kutaisi 
  [Smirnov 82] 
[Jun 10] 
Dinamo Minsk                  1-2  CSKA Moskva 
  [Yuriy Pogalnikov 80 pen – Boris Kazakov 20, 67] 
Dinamo Moskva                 1-1  Lokomotiv Moskva 
  [Valeriy Fadeyev 32 – Yuriy Ivanov 67] 
Energetik Dushanbe            1-3  NEFTYANIK Baku 
  [Y.Pekshev – Adamas Golodets-3] 
Kuban Krasnodar               1-4  SPARTAK Moskva 
  [Gorin 5 – Vyacheslav Ambartsumyan 31, 47, 83, Yuriy Falin 74] 
SKA Lvov                      3-1  Volga Gorkiy 
  [Sekech, Puzach, Pfeiffer – Dmitrasevich (S) og]

===== Second round replays =====
[Jun 6] 
RostSelMash Rostov-na-Donu    1-2  SKA Rostov-na-Donu 
  [Yuriy Mosalyov 78 – Vladimir Kazachek 72, 80] 
[Jun 11] 
DINAMO Moskva                 2-1  Lokomotiv Moskva 
  [Yuriy Avrutskiy 55, 72 – Kleshchov 23]

==== Third round ====
[Jun 11] 
Shakhtyor Donetsk             1-2  KRYLYA SOVETOV Kuibyshev 
  [Anatoliy Rodin ? – V.Grishin 12, Biryuchevskiy 32] 
SHINNIK Yaroslavl             1-0  Zenit Leningrad             [aet] 
  [Alexandr Lenyov 95] 
[Jun 14] 
SKA Rostov-na-Donu            0-1  SKA Lvov 
  [S.Sekech 59] 
[Jun 17] 
CSKA Moskva                   2-1  SKF Sevastopol              [aet] 
  [Yuriy Basalik 75, Vladimir Fedotov 113 – Nekhanov 32] 
ŽALGIRIS Vilnius              4-0  Lokomotiv Chelyabinsk 
  [Leonardas Žukauskas, Petras Glodenis, Romualdas Juska, Kaledinskas] 
[Aug 6] 
SPARTAK Moskva                1-0  Kayrat Alma-Ata 
  [Gennadiy Logofet 74] 
[Aug 10] 
DINAMO Kiev                   4-1  Neftyanik Baku  
  [Viktor Kanevskiy 4, 28, 53, Andrei Biba 46 – Anatoliy Banishevskiy 82] 
[Aug 15] 
DINAMO Moskva                 2-1  Dinamo Tbilisi              [aet] 
  [Valeriy Fadeyev 19, Viktor Anichkin 112 – Ilya Datunashvili 82]

==== Quarterfinals ====
[Jun 21] 
KRYLYA SOVETOV Kuibyshev      1-0  SKA Lvov 
  [Nikolai Osyanin 15] 
[Aug 29] 
DINAMO Moskva                 2-0  CSKA Moskva 
  [Igor Chislenko 60, Yuriy Vshivtsev 80] 
Shinnik Yaroslavl             1-3  DINAMO Kiev 
  [Vladimir Atamanychev 85 – Andrei Biba 17, Valentin Levchenko 72, Viktor Kanevskiy 76] 
[Aug 30] 
SPARTAK Moskva                1-0  Žalgiris Vilnius 
  [Galimzyan Husainov 15]

==== Semifinals ====
[Sep 7] 
Dinamo Moskva                 2-3  KRYLYA SOVETOV Kuibyshev  
  [Valeriy Maslov 23, Eduard Mudrik 79 pen – Anatoliy Kikin 42, 46, Nikolai Osyanin 49] 
[Sep 8] 
Spartak Moskva                0-0  Dinamo Kiev

===== Semifinals replays =====
[Sep 9] 
Spartak Moskva                2-3  DINAMO Kiev 
  [Galimzyan Husainov 14, Igor Netto 64 – Oleg Bazilevich 43, 56, Viktor Serebryanikov 58]

==== Final ====
27 September 1964

Dinamo Kiev	1 – 0	Krylia Sovetov Kuibyshev
Kanevskiy 17'	[ Report]

Moscow
