= Football Championship of the Moldavian SSR =

- Founded: 1940
- Folded: 1991
- Country: Moldavian SSR (Soviet Union)
- Last champions: Speranța Nisporeni (1st title) (1991–92)
- Most championships: 6 – Dinamo Chișinău (Security Police Sports Club)

The Football Championship of the Moldavian SSR in football was a top competition of association football in the Moldavian SSR in 1940-91 soon after the Soviet occupation of Bessarabia and Northern Bukovina during the World War II in 1940.

The competition was organized based on Romanian clubs from Bessarabia (Kingdom of Romania) and Ukrainian clubs from the Moldavian ASSR that existed in 1924–1940.

== List of champions ==
- 1940: Komanda Chișinău
- 1942–1944: Tournament Interrupted
- 1945: Dinamo Chișinău
- 1946: Dinamo Chișinău
- 1947: Spartak Tiraspol
- 1948: Dinamo Chișinău
- 1949: Burevestnik Bender
- 1950: Krasnoe Znamea Chișinău
- 1951: Krasnaia Zvezda Tiraspol
- 1952: Burevestnik Bender
- 1953: Dinamo Chișinău
- 1954: Institutul Agricol Chișinău
- 1955: Burevestnik Bender
- 1956: Spartak Tiraspol
- 1957: Institutul Agricol Chișinău
- 1958: Moldavkabel Bender
- 1959: ICȘ PVV Chișinău
- 1960: Echipa orașului Tiraspol
- 1961: Institutul Agricol Chișinău
- 1962: Universitatea Chișinău
- 1963: Temp Tiraspol
- 1964: Temp Tiraspol
- 1965: Energia Tiraspol
- 1966: Stroiindustria Bălți
- 1967: Nistrul Bender
- 1968: Temp Tiraspol
- 1969: Politehnica Chișinău
- 1970: Politehnica Chișinău
- 1971: Pișcevik Bender
- 1972: Kolhozul Lenin Edineț
- 1973: Pișcevik Bender
- 1974: Dinamo Chișinău
- 1975: Dinamo Chișinău
- 1976: Stroitel Tiraspol
- 1977: Stroitel Tiraspol
- 1978: Nistru Tiraspol
- 1979: Nistru Cioburciu
- 1980: Nistru Cioburciu
- 1981: Grănicerul Glodeni
- 1982: Grănicerul Glodeni
- 1983: Grănicerul Glodeni
- 1984: Grănicerul Glodeni
- 1985: Iskra Râbnița
- 1986: Avangard Lazovsc
- 1987: Tekstilșcik-2 Tiraspol
- 1988: Tighina Bender
- 1989: Tekstilșcik-2 Tiraspol
- 1990: Moldovahidromaș Chișinău
- 1991: Cristalul Fălești
- 1991–92: Speranța Nisporeni

== See also ==
- Moldovan Super Liga
