= FC Burevisnyk Melitopol =

Former professional football club based in Melitopol, Ukraine

Burevisnyk Melitopol
- Founded: 1954
- Dissolved: 1966
- Ground: Spartak Stadium, Mariupol
- Final season; 1966: 33rd (Withdrew from Ukrainian Class B)

FC Burevisnyk Melitopol was a Ukrainian amateur football club from Melitopol, Zaporizhzhia Oblast.

Burevisnyk was formed in 1954. It won the city championship in 1955. Club represented Melitopol Institute of Mechanical Engineers of Agriculture. In 1956, 1957, 1960 and 1961 team won Zaporizhzhia Oblast Championship. In 1960, 1961 and 1962 they won Zaporizhzhia Oblast Cup and took part in Ukrainian qualification for the Soviet Cup in 1963. The team competed as a professional club in Football Championship of the Ukrainian SSR between 1963 and 1966.

== Name change ==
- 1956 – 1st half 1965 Burevisnyk Melitopol
- 2nd half 1965 – 1966 Spartak Melitopol
- January 1966 – May 1966 Lyman Melitopol

== Sources ==
- Kazakov, Yevgeniy (2019), История чемпионатов СССР по футболу [The history of the USSR football championships] (in Russian), vol. 1 (1936-1969), Izdatelskiye Resheniya, ISBN 978-5-0050-7970-1
