= FC Dunayets Izmail =

Former professional football club based in Izmail, Ukraine

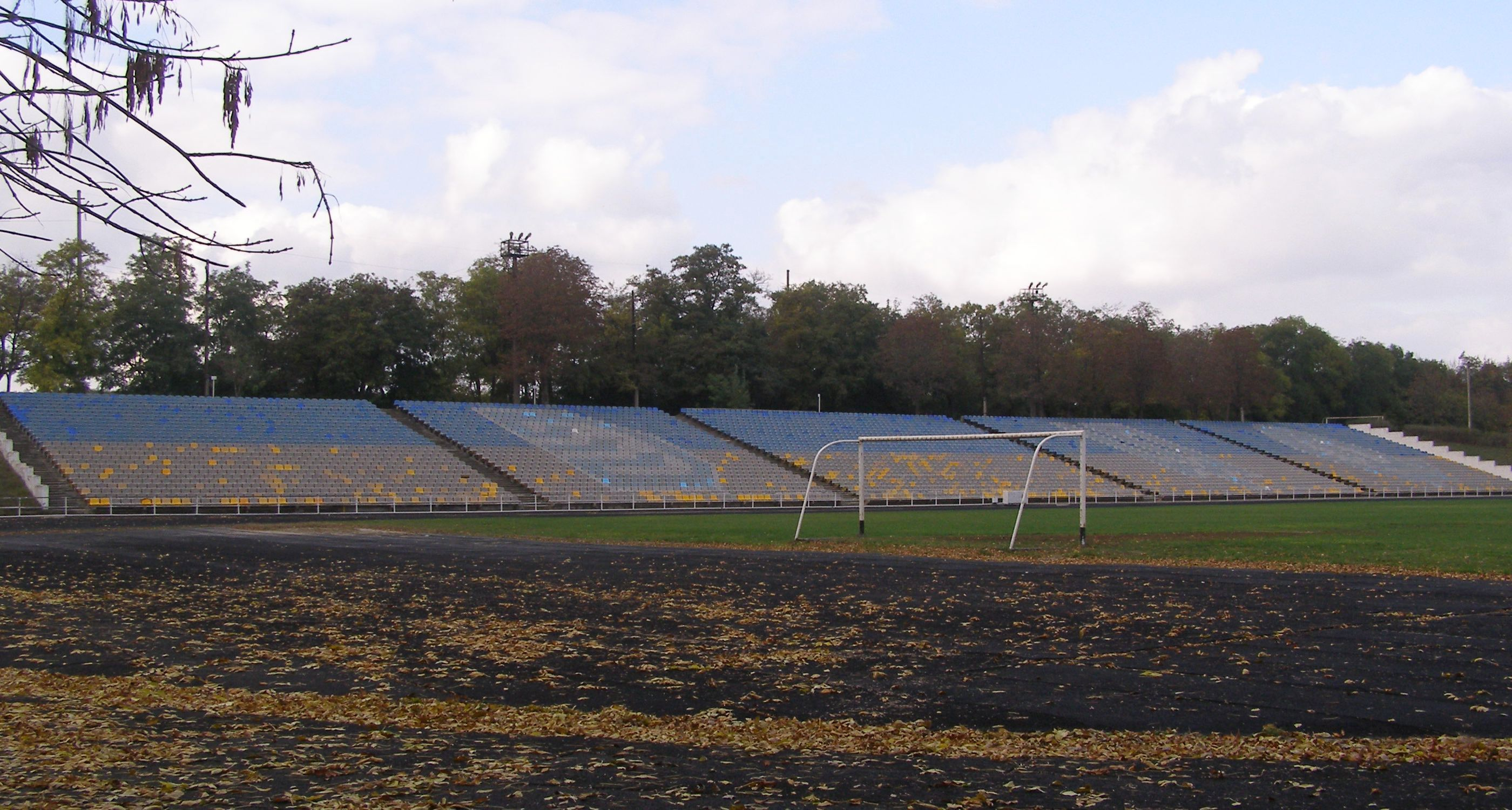
Central Stadium of the Ukrainian Danube Shipping Company in Ismail

FC Dunayets Izmail was a Ukrainian amateur football club from Izmail, Odesa Oblast.

Soviet Danube Shipping Company started the club in 1950s. The team competed as a professional club in Football Championship of the Ukrainian SSR between 1964 and 1969. In 1960 team won Odesa Oblast Championship. In 1962 they won Odesa Oblast Cup and took part in Ukrainian qualification for the Soviet Cup. Club played its home matches at the Soviet Danube Shipping Company stadium.
