= 1963 FC Dnipro Kremenchuk season =

1st season in existence of Dnipro Kremenchuk FC

Dnipro
1963 season
- Head coach: Anatolii Sadovskyi
- Stadium: Torpedo Stadium
- Soviet Second League: 20th Zone 1 (40th combined table)
- Soviet Cup: Ukrainian 3rd Zone 1/8 Final
- Top goalscorer: League: Mykola Prymostka (8); All: Mykola Prymostka (8)
- Biggest win: 4–0 vs Avanhard Chernivtsi (H), 2 July 1963, Class B 4–0 vs Strila Poltava (H), 3 November 1963, Class B play-off
- Biggest defeat: 0–7 vs Sudnobudivnyk Mykolaiv (A), 22 September 1963, Class B

The 1963 season was Dnipro Kremenchuk's 1st year in the Ukrainian Class B a Soviet football competition at the Soviet third tier. In addition to the domestic league, Dnipro also participated in this season's editions of the Soviet Cup and Cup of Central Committee of Leninist Communist League of Youth of Ukraine. Managed by Anatolii Sadovskyi they finished fortieth in the combined championship table and had to rely on two play-offs to remain in the league. They were eliminated form both cups in their first matches. The season covers the period from 1 January 1963 to 31 December 1963.

== Season summary ==
=== Pre-season ===
On 7 February it was announced that Presidium of the Council of the Union of Sports Societies and Organizations of the Ukrainian SSR and Football Federation of the Ukrainian SSR agreed to allow a professional club to be formed in Kremenchuk. Club was allocated a spot in 1963 Ukrainian Class B season. The team was formed at the KrAZ factory. Club academy began accepting boys born in 1945 through 1950. Anatolii Sadovskyi was appointed manager and Yevhen Leontovych was his assistant. Club scheduled a pre-season training camp in Izmail. Anatolii Lytvynov, Borys Konfederat, Stanislav Troitak, Yevhenii Basov and others joined the club from Torpedo Kremenchuk, a team who represented the factory in previous year. Mykola Arsiienko and Hennadii Poryshkin joined after representing Dnipro in previous year. Former Dnipro players Oleksandr Shakytskyi returned from Geolog Tyumen and Yevsevii Vaks from Kolhospnyk Poltava. Leonid Sendetskyi came from Dynamo Kyiv, Mykola Piven from Dunaiets Izmail and Oleksandr Smahin joined from Khabarovsk. In early April club was renamed from temporary name "Avanhard" to Dnipro.

=== April ===
Due to bad weather first matched to be played on 7 April was postponed. On 13 April Dnipro faced Zirka Kirovohrad in clubs debut at professional level. Players were not organized, with a lot of bad passes. Individualism lead Dnipro to concede three goals and lose their first match. Dnipro faced Shakhtar Oleksandria in a qualifying stage of the cup. Shakhtar scored one goal in each half with Dnipro scoring one. Pyrukhin states that two players are listed by different sources, Vzhychynskyi and Heorhii Pylypenko. On 21 April Dnipro traveled to play Arsenal Kyiv. Arsenal controlled the game early on. Dnipro slowly managed to come back into the game and begin attacking. During second half the tempo increased and Arsenal scored the only goal. Next week match-day was filled with lots of lightning, heavy rains and hail. Dnipro defenders had a good game against Naftovyk Drohobych. Strikers were struggling, with only Mykola Prymostka having a good game. Match ended with a 0–0 draw, bringing Dnipro its first point.

=== May ===
On 2 May Dnipro traveled to Ternopil to face Avanhard Ternopil. The team scored their first professional league goal through an Unknown goalscorer on twenty-second minute. Avanhard equalized on seventieth minute. The unimpressive game finished with a 1–1 draw. Dnipro played its first friendly game against Kolhospnyk Berezhany. Kolhospnyk won the game as Dnipro players managed to score two goals and home team scored three. A few days later team played in Lviv against SKA Lviv on 9 May. Mykola Prymostka scored his first goal, however that was not enough to win as the home team scored twice. Next week Dnipro played at home, hosting Spartak Ivano-Frankivsk on 14 May. Anatolii Lytvynov scored the only goal of the game on fiftieth minute, giving Dnipro its first professional win. Other source states that Prymostka was the goalscorer. After the win came a big 5–0 loss to SKA Kyiv on 19 May. Prymostka scored a second half goal in a 3–1 loss to Shakhtar Oleksandriia on 25th. Dnipro finished the moth with a 1–1 draw with Desna Chernihiv. Yevsevii Vaks scored his first goal.

=== June ===
June began with a loss to Dynamo Khmelnytskyi. Losses continued to Verkhovyna Uzhhorod on the sixth, Polissya Zhytomyr on the eleventh and Budivelnyk Kherson on the fifteenth. Dnipro earned a point in a goalless draw with Sudnobudivnyk Mykolaiv four days later. This was followed by another loss to league leaders Lokomotyv Vinnytsia on the twenty-third. Yevsevii Vaks scored the clubs first goal of the month. Dnipro was bottom of the table. Dnipro traveled to Bar to face a Combined Bar team in a friendly mid-week game. It finished in a one-all draw. Last match of the month was another loss to Kolhospnyk Rivne.

=== July ===
July began with a 4–0 win against Avanhard Chernivtsi. Both Prymostka and Vaks scored twice. István Shtefutsa returned to defense after a long absence due to injury. Four days later it was followed by another win against Volyn Lutsk. Volyn was controlling the early game with Dnipro attacking through the center. As that proved unsuccessful, they switched play play to the wings. This allowed Viktor Yefimenko to score the first goal. It was followed by goals from Dmytro Everhetov and Prymostka. On 10 July Dnipro met with Dynamo Khmelnytskyi in a Cup of the Central Committee of Leninist Communist League of Youth of Ukraine. Goals from Hennadii Poryshkin and Everhetov were not enough as the opposition scored four. Shtefutsa was sent-off for a bad foul. Another friendly was played on the sixteenth against a local team Avanhard Kremenchuk. Game was fast-paced and very aggressive with the referee allowing many fouls. The match against Kolhospnyk Cherkasy on the twentieth ended in defeat. Dnipro played below their abilities after winning two previous matches. Four days later Dnipro traveled to play Zirka Kirovohrad. They lost 5–0. Another Dnipro win came on the twenty-eight. Dnipro hosted Arsenal Kyiv. Mykola Piven scored the first goal from 30 meters after a free kick on sixteenth minute. Five minutes later the visitor equalized after Dnipro goalkeeper dropped the ball. A minute later Dnipro had a goal disallowed. Prymostka scored the second goal from difficult angle, and Arsenal equalized again on seventy-second minute. With three minutes to go, Vaks scored the winning goal. On last day of the month Dnipro played Kolhospnyk Cherkasy. This match was originally scheduled to be played on 7 April and was postponed due to bad weather.

=== August ===
August began with a 4–0 loss to Naftovyk Drohobych on the third. Four days later Dnipro hosted Avanhard Ternopil. Borys Skyba and Viktor Yefimenko returned after a period of illness. The game which ended in a 0–0 draw was shadowed by large presence of hooligans. Dnipro hosted Dnipro Dnipropetrovsk in a friendly match on the ninth. In the middle of the first half, unnamed midfielder scored for the visitors. Borys Skyba equalized for the hosts. Match ended in a 1–1 draw. On the eleventh Dnipro played SKA Lviv at home. It was a memorable match. Visitors attacked from the early minutes. SKA opened the score four minutes before the break. They continued pressing Dnipro after restart. They were very successful at using an offside trap to stop Dnipro players making a shot on goal. At the end of regular time Prymostka scored after the goalkeeper parried his initial shot. Next week Dnipro traveled to Spartak Ivano-Frankivsk where they were unable to score and lost 3–0. Dnipro began their match against SKA Kyiv very aggressively. They were rewarded for their effort with a goal by Prymostka. Right before the break, visitors scored from eighteen meters. With ten minutes left in the game, visitors scored again. Dnipro players did not try to get back into the game and it finished 1–2. On the twenty-seventh Dnipro hosted neighboring Shakhtar Oleksandriia. Even though Dnipro player had the ball and created more chances than the opposition, they were unsuccessful at scoring. Match ended in a 0–0 draw. Dnipro finished the month with a 3–1 loss to Desna Chernihiv.

=== September ===
On September first Avanhard Kharkiv visited Kremenchuk for a friendly match against Dnipro. First half ended with 0-0 as both sides were unable to score, despite numerous attempts. During second half a former Avanhard player Arkadii Mangasarov came on for Dnipro. This change made the game more lively and Dnipro continuously attacked. However they conceded first. Mangasarov was able to score against his former club and Piven won the game by hitting the ball into top corner. Three days later Dnipro traveled to play Dynamo Khmelnytskyi. Hosts were a more attacking team and were rewarded for their efforts after seventeen minutes of play. Yurii Puzikov scored an own goal after which Dnipro players gave up and conceded two more goals. One of which was again an own goal by a defender. Dnipro managed to score a late goal. Dnipro won their fifth game of the season against Verkhovyna Uzhhorod on the eighth. Stanislav Troitak opened the score in the first minute. Borys Skyba doubled the lead close to end of second half. Visitors managed to come back into the game and score one goal. However Anatolii Lytvynov scored a penalty kick for Dnipro to make the game 3–1. On the fourteenth Dnipro lost 2–0 to Polissya Zhytomyr. Four days later Dnipro played away at Budivelnyk Kherson. Dnipro conceded a quick goal and 2 more in the first half. In the second half Budivelnyk scored once more and game became uneventful as host sat back and waited for game to finish. Viktor Stupak managed to score one goal for Dnipro. Dnipro who was last in their group had their worst game on twenty-second. They conceded seven goals from Sudnobudivnyk Mykolaiv. Four days later Dnipro hosted SKA Novosibirskwho played in the Soviet Class A Second Group. Mykola Prymostka scored one goal and Viktor Stupak scored three. Visitor only managed two goals. Dnipro's success was in part due to two academy players who joined the first team, Kuzmin and Serhii Siladin. Vaks scored Dnipro's lone goal in a 3–1 home loss to Lokomotyv Vinnytsia on the twenty-eighth.

=== October ===
On 2 October Dnipro lost 3–1 at home Kolhospnyk Rivne. Four days later they played away with Avanhard Chernivtsi. Having conceded three minutes into the game, Dnipro players managed to equalize through Stupak on the twenty-seventh minute. Two minutes before the break, hosts took the lead. Avanhard scored another goal from a free-kick. Unknown Dnipro player scored the last goal in the game. Last league match was played on 10 October. It was an away game with Volyn Lutsk. Match ended 2–2 with Dnipro picking up their eighteenth point. Three days later Dnipro played a friendly match against Zirka Kirovohrad. Dnipro scored two fast goals, and another well into the first half. Viktor Stupak scored all three. Prymostka also scored in the second half. Visitors scored a late consolation goal. Dnipro faced Spartak Sumy in play-off matches for thirty-ninth and fortieth spot. Dnipro lost 2–0 in the first match on nineteenth. On the twenty-second Dnipro hosted Strela Moscow for a friendly match. Visitors scored first. In the second half Dnipro began playing better and Mykola Piven had his long shot saved. However the goalkeeper dropped the ball which allowed Anatolii Lytvynov to equalize. Academy forward Oleksandr Ivaniushko had an inspiring game. Return leg of the play-offs was three days later. Even-though Dnipro players pressed and attacked all game, they could not score. Match ended in a 0-0 and Dnipro now occupied fortieth place in the combined league table.

=== November ===
With losing the play-off matches Dnipro was forced to play two more games with the winners of the Poltava Oblast Championship Strila Poltava. The first match on the third began with both team being cautions. Dnipro players were first to take control of the match and score though Anatolii Lytvynov on fourteenth minute. Nine minutes later Viktor Stupak doubled the score. After the hour mark Mykola Prymostka scored another goal. Lytvynov scored his second on seventy-sixth minute. Five days later in the second leg Dnipro only scored once through Viktor Yefimenko. With winning the play-offs they guaranteed a spot in the 1964 Ukrainian Class B Championship. At the end of the season Dnipro played three friendly matches in four days. All matches were played in Kremenchuk. First match was a 5–1 win against Shakhtar from unknown city on the fourteenth. Next day Dnipro won again 4–0 against Kolhospnyk Poltava. Prymostka scored on twenty-fifth minute. Last game was against a city club Avanhard Kremenchuk. Dnipro lost 3–1. Avanhard began attacking and was the first team to score. Dnipro leveled through Stupak, however visitors scored two more in the second half. In the final minute of the match, Prymoska had a chance to score a penalty after a defender handled the ball. He hit the post and the referee blew his whistle ending the season for Dnipro.

== Team kit ==
The team home kit was all blue while away kit was white.

== Management team ==
Anatolii Sadovskyi was the manager for the whole season, however Pyrukhin also listed Otari Dzidziguri as the manager, however no dates were listed for him.

Position	Name	Year appointed	Last club/team	References
Manager	Anatolii Sadovskyi	1963	Dnipro	
Assistant Coach	Yevhen Leontovych	1963	Torpedo Kremenchuk	

== Players ==
=== Squad information ===
First squad list was published on 1 April 1963.

Known appearances include all competitions (League, Cup, Cup of Central Committee and play-off matches. Known Squad Numbers are listed, numbers in ( ) are also known numbers for players during the season. Many games only have partial records provided by Pyrukhin.

No.	Player	Nat.	Position(s)	Date of birth (age)	Signed in	Signed from	Apps.	Goals
Goalkeepers
	Boris Konfederat	(Soviet Union)	GK	4 July 1943 (aged 20)	1963	(Soviet Union) Torpedo Kremenchuk	10	0
	Viktor Slabko	(Soviet Union)	GK	4 November 1940 (aged 23)	1963	(Soviet Union) Kolhospnyk Poltava	9	0
	Berestov	(Soviet Union)	GK		1963	(Soviet Union)	0	0
Defenders
2	Mykola Piven	(Soviet Union)	DF	8 August 1938 (aged 25)	1963	(Soviet Union) Dunaiets Izmail	14	1
3	Serhii Siladin	(Soviet Union)	DF	Missing required parameter 1=month! (aged −62)	1963	(Soviet Union) Dnipro Academy	5	0
	Arkadii Mykulynskyi	(Soviet Union)	DF	30 January 1938 (aged 25)	1963	(Soviet Union) Torpedo Kremenchuk	5	0
	Leonid Sendetskyi	(Soviet Union)	DF	7 March 1944 (aged 19)	1963	(Soviet Union) Dynamo Kyiv	1	0
3	István Shtefutsa	(Soviet Union)	DF	Missing required parameter 1=month! 1940 (aged 22–23)	1963	(Soviet Union) Dnipro Dnipropetrovsk	18	0
5	Valerii Kushnyrskyi	(Soviet Union)	DF	Missing required parameter 1=month! 1941 (aged 21–22)	1963	(Soviet Union) Dnipro	4	0
9	Razmik Sahakyan	(Soviet Union)	DF	23 June 1938 (aged 25)	1963	(Soviet Union) SKA Minsk	4	0
Midfielders
5 (12)	Stanislav Troitak	(Soviet Union)	MF	Missing required parameter 1=month! 1937 (aged 25–26)	1963	(Soviet Union) Torpedo Kremenchuk	15	1
5	Hennadii Poryshkin (captain) (Note: Captain in the cup game)	(Soviet Union)	MF	Missing required parameter 1=month! 1939 (aged 23–24)	1963	(Soviet Union) Dnipro	8	1
	Oleksandr Smahin	(Soviet Union)	MF	Missing required parameter 1=month! 1940 (aged 22–23)	1963	(Soviet Union)	3	0
	Oleksandr Shakytskyi	(Soviet Union)	MF	1 July 1939 (aged 24)	1963	(Soviet Union) Geolog Tyumen	4	0
6	Viktor Yefimenko	(Soviet Union)	MF	7 November 1936 (aged 27)	1963	(Soviet Union) Avanhard Kriukiv	11	2
Forwards
	Heorhii Pylypenko	(Soviet Union)	ST	Missing required parameter 1=month! 1939 (aged 23–24)	1963	(Soviet Union) Torpedo Kremenchuk	4	0
8 (7)	Anatolii Lytvynov	(Soviet Union)	ST	2 October 1937 (aged 26)	1963	(Soviet Union) Torpedo Kremenchuk	15	5
13	Mykola Arsiienko	(Soviet Union)	ST	14 January 1943 (aged 20)	1963	(Soviet Union) Dnipro	2	0
11	Yevsevii Vaks	(Soviet Union)	ST	Missing required parameter 1=month! 1943 (aged 19–20)	1963	(Soviet Union) Kolhospnyk Poltava	12	6
	Viktor Teliuk	(Soviet Union)	ST	Missing required parameter 1=month! 1943 (aged 19–20)	1963	(Soviet Union)	2	0
	Yevhenii Basov	(Soviet Union)	ST	Missing required parameter 1=month! 1937 (aged 25–26)	1963	(Soviet Union) Torpedo Kremenchuk	7	0
4	Yurii Puzikov	(Soviet Union)	ST	19 August 1937 (aged 26)	1963	(Soviet Union) Torpedo Kremenchuk	7	0
9 (10)	Mykola Prymostka (captain)	(Soviet Union)	ST	21 February 1938 (aged 25)	1963	(Soviet Union) Torpedo Kremenchuk	20	9
7	Viktor Mazanov	(Soviet Union)	ST	3 January 1942 (aged 21)	1963	(Soviet Union) Avanhard Kriukiv	1	0
7 (8, 9)	Viktor Stupak	(Soviet Union)	ST	17 January 1942 (aged 21)	1963	(Soviet Union) Avanhard Kriukiv	7	3
	Arkadii Mangasarov	(Soviet Union)	ST	Missing required parameter 1=month! 1933 (aged 29–30)	1963	(Soviet Union) Spartak Yerevan	0	0
11 (13)	Borys Skyba	(Soviet Union)	ST	Missing required parameter 1=month! 1942 (aged 20–21)	1963	(Soviet Union) Kolhospnyk Poltava	5	1
	Oleksandr Ivaniushko	(Soviet Union)	ST	6 May 1946 (aged 17)	1963	(Soviet Union) Dnipro Academy	0	0
7	Dmytro Everhetov	(Soviet Union)	ST	Missing required parameter 1=month! 1938 (aged 24–25)	1963	(Soviet Union) Shakhtar Oleksandriiske	3	2
Unknown Position
	Viktor Vzhychynskyi	(Soviet Union)		25 October 1937 (aged 26)	1963	(Soviet Union)	4	0
	V. Sykholutskyi	(Soviet Union)			1963	(Soviet Union)	0	0
	Kazarian	(Soviet Union)			1963	(Soviet Union)	2	0
	Pershyn	(Soviet Union)			1963	(Soviet Union)	1	0
8	Zaikin	(Soviet Union)			1963	(Soviet Union)	1	0
1	Kuzmin	(Soviet Union)			1963	(Soviet Union) Dnipro Academy	0	0
11	Galustian	(Soviet Union)			1963	(Soviet Union)	0	0

== Pre-season and friendlies ==
Win Draw Loss Fixtures

Results list Dnipro's goal tally first.

Date	Opponent	Venue	Result	Dnipro scorers	Referee
May 1963	Kolhospnyk Berezhany	Away	2–3	Unknown Goalscorers ?'	
July 1963	Combined Bar team	Away	1–1	Unknown Goalscorer 85'	
16 July 1963	Avanhard Kremenchuk	Away	1–1	Unknown Goalscorer 67'	Markov
9 August 1963	Dnipro Dnipropetrovsk	Home	1–1	Skyba ?'	
1 September 1963	Avanhard Kharkiv	Home	2–1	Mangasarov 68', Piven 90'	
26 September 1963	SKA Novosibirsk	Home	4–2	Prymostka ?', Stupak (3) ?', ?' ?'	
13 October 1963	Zirka Kirovohrad	Home	4–1	Stupak (3) 2', 14' ?', Prymostka ?'	
22 October 1963	Strela Moscow	Home	1–1	Lytvynov ?'	
6 November 1963 – 15:00	Kolhospnyk Poltava	Away	0–0		
14 November 1963	Shakhtar	Home	5–1	Unknown Goalscorers ?'	
15 (Note: Pyrukhin questions the datein his book.) November 1963	Kolhospnyk Poltava	Home	4–0	Prymostka 25', Unknown Goalscorers ?'	
17 November 1963	Avanhard Kremenchuk	Home	1–3	Stupak ?'	

== Competitions ==
=== Overall record ===
Competition	First match	Last match	Starting round	Final position	Record							
Competition	First match	Last match	Starting round	Final position	Pld	W	D	L	GF	GA	GD	Win %
1963 Ukrainian Class B	13 April 1963	10 October 1963	Matchday 1	20th	38	5	8	25	32	82	−50	13.16
Play-off Places 39–40	19 October 1963	27 October 1963	Play-off Matchday 1	40th	2	0	1	1	0	2	−2	0.00
1963 Ukrainian Class B Play-Off to remain in league	3 November 1963	8 November 1963	Play-off Matchday 1	Won play-off	2	2	0	0	5	0	+5	100.00
1963 Soviet Cup	17 April 1963	17 April 1963	Ukrainian 3rd Zone 1/8 Final	Ukrainian 3rd Zone 1/8 Final	1	0	0	1	1	2	−1	0.00
1963 Cup of Central Committee of Leninist Communist League of Youth of Ukraine	10 July 1963	10 July 1963	1/32 Final	1/32 Final	1	0	0	1	2	4	−2	0.00
Total					44	7	9	28	40	90	−50	15.91

Source: Competitions

=== Ukrainian Class B ===
==== Results summary ====
Point total was 18, as 2 point for win were awarded.

Overall								Home						Away					
Pld	W	D	L	GF	GA	GD	Pts	W	D	L	GF	GA	GD	W	D	L	GF	GA	GD
38	5	8	25	32	82	−50	18	5	5	9	19	23	−4	0	3	16	13	59	−46

Source: wildstat.com

==== League table ====
Pos	Team	Pld	W	D	L	GF	GA	GD	Pts
16	FC Shakhtar Oleksandria	38	7	12	19	28	56	−28	26
17	FC Volyn Lutsk	38	8	10	20	24	61	−37	26
18	FC Kolhospnyk Rivne	38	9	7	22	37	57	−20	25
19	FC Naftovyk Drohobych	38	5	14	19	36	54	−18	24
20	FC Dnipro Kremenchuk	38	5	8	25	32	82	−50	18

==== Zone 1 ====
The league fixtures were announced on 23 March 1963.

Win Draw Loss Fixtures

Results list Dnipro's goal tally first.

Date	Opponent	Venue	Result	Dnipro scorers	Referee	Attendance	Position
13 April 1963 – 16:00	Zirka Kirovohrad	Home	0–3				
21 April 1963	Arsenal Kyiv	Away	0–1				
28 April 1963	Naftovyk Drohobych	Home	0–0				
2 May 1963	Avanhard Ternopil	Away	1–1	Unknown Goalscorer ?'			
9 May 1963 – 18:30	SKA Lviv	Away	1–2	Prymostka ?'			
14 May 1963	Spartak Ivano-Frankivsk	Home	1–0	Lytvynov 50'			
19 May 1963	SKA Kyiv	Away	0–5				
25 May 1963	Shakhtar Oleksandriia	Away	1–3	Prymostka ?'			
29 May 1963	Desna Chernihiv	Away	1–1	Vaks ?'			
2 June 1963	Dynamo Khmelnytskyi	Home	0–1				
6 June 1963	Verkhovyna Uzhhorod	Away	0–5				
11 June 1963	Polissia Zhytomyr	Home	0–1				
15 June 1963	Budivelnyk Kherson	Home	0–1				
19 June 1963	Sudnobudivnyk Mykolaiv	Home	0–0				
23 June 1963	Lokomotyv Vinnytsia	Away	1–2				
28 June 1963	Kolhospnyk Rivne	Away	1–3	Unknown Goalscorer ?'			
2 July 1963	Avanhard Chernivtsi	Home	4–0	Prymostka (2) 25', 64', Vaks (2) ?', ?'			
6 July 1963	Volyn Lutsk	Home	3–0	Yefimenko 43', Everhetov 70', Prymostka 86'			
20 July 1963	Kolhospnyk Cherkasy	Home	0–2				
24 July 1963	Zirka Kirovohrad	Away	0–5				
28 July 1963	Arsenal Kyiv	Home	3–2	Piven 16', Prymostka ?', Vaks 87'			
31 July 1963	Kolhospnyk Cherkasy	Away	1–2	Unknown Goalscorer ?'			
3 August 1963	Naftovyk Drohobych	Away	0–4				
7 August 1963	Avanhard Ternopil	Home	0–0				
11 August 1963	SKA Lviv	Home	1–1	Prymostka 90'			
17 August 1963	Spartak Ivano-Frankivsk	Away	0–3				
21 August 1963	SKA Kyiv	Home	1–2	Prymostka 12'			
27 August 1963	Shakhtar Oleksandriia	Home	0–0				
31 August 1963	Desna Chernihiv	Home	1–3	Unknown Goalscorer ?'			
4 September 1963	Dynamo Khmelnytskyi	Away	1–4	Lytvynov ?'			
8 September 1963	Verkhovyna Uzhhorod	Home	3–1	Troitak 1', Skyba ?', Lytvynov 80' (pen.)			
14 September 1963	Polissia Zhytomyr	Away	0–2				
18 September 1963	Budivelnyk Kherson	Away	1–4	Stupak ?'			
22 September 1963	Sudnobudivnyk Mykolaiv	Away	0–7				
28 September 1963	Lokomotyv Vinnytsia	Home	1–3	Vaks ?'			
2 October 1963	Kolhospnyk Rivne	Home	1–3	Unknown Goalscorer ?'			
6 October 1963	Avanhard Chernivtsi	Away	2–3	Stupak 27', Unknown Goalscorer ?'			
10 October 1963	Volyn Lutsk	Away	2–2	Unknown Goalscorers ?'			

=== Play-Off ===
==== 39th-40th Place ====
Dnipro faced Spartak Sumy, who finished twentieth in Zone 2 for the thirty-ninth and fortieth place in the overall league table. After two matches Dnipro lost and finished last in the league.

Win Draw Loss Fixtures

Results list Dnipro's goal tally first.

Date	Opponent	Venue	Result	Dnipro scorers	Referee	Attendance
19 October 1963	Spartak Sumy	Away	0–2			
27 October 1963	Spartak Sumy	Home	0–0			

==== Play-Off to remain ====
Having finished 40th in Ukrainian Class B, Dnipro faced Poltava Oblast Champion Strila Poltava in order to remain in Class B for the 1964 season.

Results list Dnipro's goal tally first.

Date	Opponent	Venue	Result	Dnipro scorers	Referee	Attendance
3 November 1963	Strila Poltava	Home	4–0	Lytvynov (2) 14',76', Stupak 29', Prymostka 62'		
8 November 1963 – 14:00	Strila Poltava	Away	0–1	Yefimenko (?)		

=== Soviet Cup ===
Out of 40 class B clubs only 3 were permitted into the final stage of the cup. 40 teams were split into three groups. Dnipro was assigned to third group.

Win Draw Loss Fixtures

Date	Opponent	Venue	Result	Dnipro scorers	Referee	Attendance
17 April 1963 – 18:00	Shakhtar Oleksandriia	Away	1–2	Vzhychynskyi 85'	Henrukh Eidelman	8,000

=== CC LCLYU Cup ===
Win Draw Loss Fixtures

Date	Opponent	Venue	Result	Dnipro scorers	Referee	Attendance
10 July 1963	Dynamo Khmelnytskyi	Away	2–4	Poryshkin ?', Everhetov ?'	5,000	Mykhailo Mylitian

== Statistics ==
=== Appearances and goals ===
The plus (+) symbol denotes an appearance as a substitute, hence 2+1 indicates two appearances in the starting XI and one appearance as a substitute.

No.	Pos	Nat	Player	Total		League		Play-off		Cup		Cup of Central Committee	
No.	Pos	Nat	Player	Apps	Goals	Apps	Goals	Apps	Goals	Apps	Goals	Apps	Goals
	GK	(Soviet Union) URS	Boris Konfederat	10	0	7	0	2	0	1	0	-	-
	GK	(Soviet Union) URS	Viktor Slabko	9	0	9	0	-	-	-	-	-	-
2	DF	(Soviet Union) URS	Mykola Piven	14	1	10	1	2	0	1	0	1	0
	DF	(Soviet Union) URS	Arkadii Mykulynskyi	5	0	4	0	0	0	1	0	-	-
	DF	(Soviet Union) URS	Leonid Sendetskyi	1	0	1	0	-	-	-	-	-	-
3	DF	(Soviet Union) URS	István Shtefutsa	18	0	13	0	3	0	1	0	1	0
5	DF	(Soviet Union) URS	Valerii Kushnyrskyi	4	0	1	0	2	0	0	0	1	0
9	DF	(Soviet Union) URS	Razmik Sahakyan	4	0	2	0	2	0	-	-	-	-
5	MF	(Soviet Union) URS	Stanislav Troitak	15	1	9+2	1	2	0	1	0	1	0
5	MF	(Soviet Union) URS	Hennadii Poryshkin	9	1	7	1	0	0	1	0	1	0
	MF	(Soviet Union) URS	Oleksandr Smahin	2	0	1	0	0	0	1	0	-	-
	MF	(Soviet Union) URS	Oleksandr Shakytskyi	4	0	4	0	-	-	-	-	-	-
6	MF	(Soviet Union) URS	Viktor Yefimenko	11	2	7+1	1	1+1	1	0	0	1	0
	FW	(Soviet Union) URS	Heorhii Pylypenko	4	0	3	0	0+1	0	-	-	-	-
8	FW	(Soviet Union) URS	Anatolii Lytvynov	15	5	12	3	2	2	1	0	-	-
13	FW	(Soviet Union) URS	Mykola Arsiienko	2	0	1	0	0	0	0+1	0	-	-
11	FW	(Soviet Union) URS	Yevsevii Vaks	12	6	12	6	-	-	-	-	-	-
	FW	(Soviet Union) URS	Viktor Teliuk	2	0	0+1	0	0	0	1	0	-	-
	FW	(Soviet Union) URS	Yevhenii Basov	7	0	6	0	0	0	1	0	-	-
4	FW	(Soviet Union) URS	Yurii Puzikov	7	0	5	0	1	0	0	0	1	0
9	FW	(Soviet Union) URS	Mykola Prymostka	20	9	16	8	2	1	1	0	1	0
7	FW	(Soviet Union) URS	Viktor Mazanov	1	0	1	0	-	-	-	-	-	-
7	FW	(Soviet Union) URS	Viktor Stupak	7	3	5	2	2	1	-	-	-	-
11	FW	(Soviet Union) URS	Borys Skyba	5	1	4+1	1	-	-	-	-	-	-
7	FW	(Soviet Union) URS	Dmytro Everhetov	3	2	2	1	0	0	0	0	1	1
		(Soviet Union) URS	Viktor Vzhychynskyi	4	0	0+2	0	0	0	0+1	0	1	0
		(Soviet Union) URS	Kazarian	2	0	0	0	0+2	0	-	-	-	-
		(Soviet Union) URS	Pershyn	1	0	0	0	1	0	-	-	-	-
8		(Soviet Union) URS	Zaikin	1	0	1	0	-	-	-	-	-	-
		(Soviet Union) URS	Byvshev	1	0	0	0	-	-	-	-	1	0

Source: Pyrukhin

=== Goalscorers ===
Rank	Pos.	Player	League	Play-off	Cup	Cup of CC	Total
1	FW	Mykola Prymostka	8	1	0	0	9
2	FW	Yevsevii Vaks	6	0	0	0	6
3	FW	Anatolii Lytvynov	3	2	0	0	5
4	FW	Viktor Stupak	2	1	0	0	3
5	FW	Dmytro Everhetov	1	0	0	1	2
5	MF	Viktor Yefimenko	1	1	0	0	2
6	DF	Mykola Piven	1	0	0	0	1
6	MF	Stanislav Troitak	1	0	0	0	1
6	FW	Borys Skyba	1	0	0	0	1
6	MF	Hennadii Poryshkin	0	0	0	1	1
Unknown goalscorers			8	0	0	0	8
Totals			32	5	0	2	39

== Sources ==
- Pyrukhin, Yurii (n.d.a), Днепр Кременчуг футбол 1963-1969 [Dnipro Kremenchuk football 1963-1969] (in Ukrainian), Kremenchuk
- Pyrukhin, Yurii (n.d.b), Энциклопедия кременчугского футбола [Encyclopedia of Kremenchuk football] (in Russian), Kremenchuk
- Lomov, Anatolii; Stadnychenko, Oleksandr (2009), 100 Років Полтавському Футболу [100 Years of Poltava Football] (in Ukrainian), Poltava: Poltava, ISBN 978-966-97035-0-7
- Lomov, Anatolii (2019), Полтавщина спортивна в обличчях і фактах. [Sport in Poltava region in faces and facts.] (in Ukrainian), Poltava: PP Dyvosvit, ISBN 978-617-633-252-7
