= List of FC Kremin Kremenchuk managers =

FC Kremin Kremenchuk managers

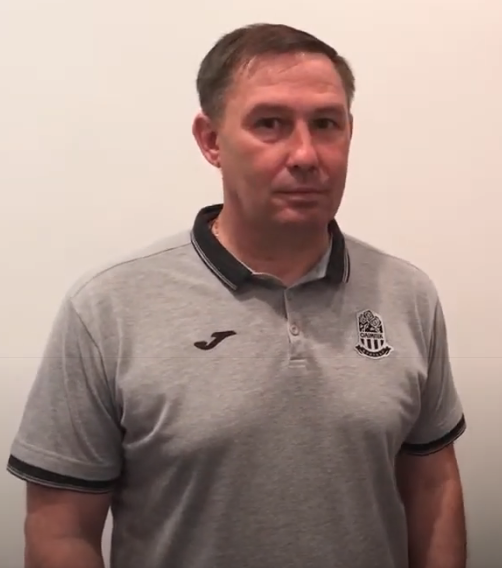
Ihor Klymovskyi Current manager.

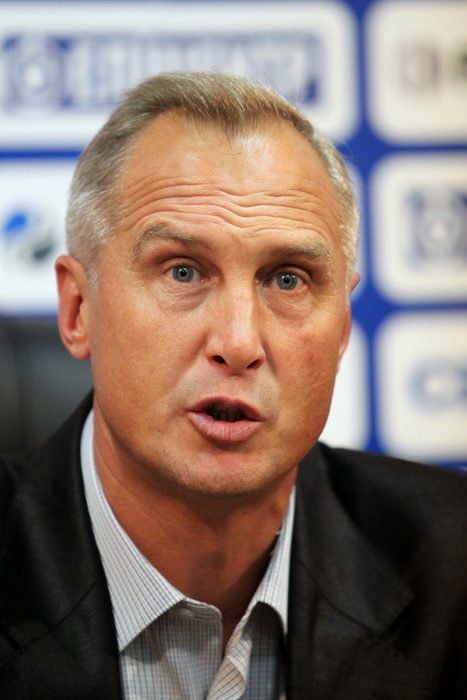
Serhiy Svystun First manager of the revived club in 2003.

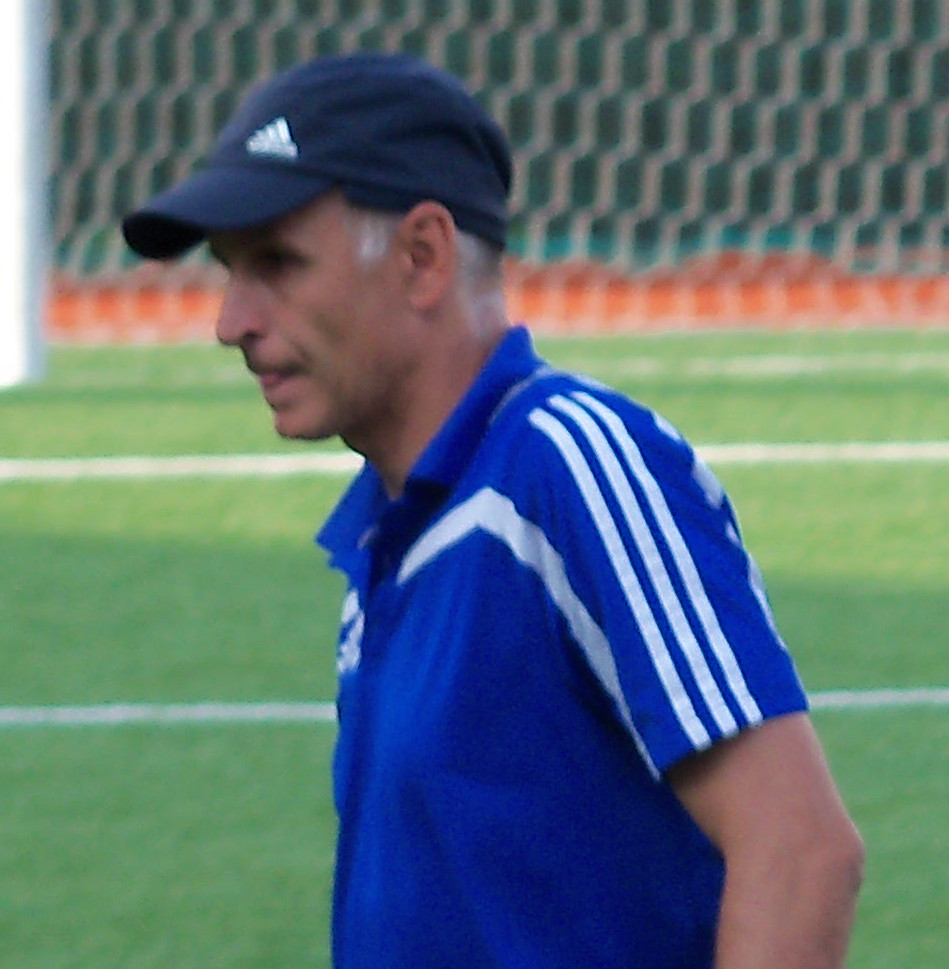
Yuriy Chumak in 2011.

This is an incomplete list of all managers of FC Kremin Kremenchuk.

== List of managers ==
This list of all managers includes performance records and honours.
M = Matches played; W = Matches won; D = Matches drawn; L = Matches lost; GF = Goals for; GA = Goals against

Manager	Nationality	From	To	M	W	D	L	GF	GA	Win%	Honours	Notes
Hryhorii Miroshnyk	Soviet Union	1960	1960	(n/a)	(n/a)	(n/a)	(n/a)	(n/a)	(n/a)	(n/a)		
Anatolii Sadovskyi	Soviet Union	October 1962	1963	44	7	9	28	38	87	15.91	1 Poltava Oblast Championship	
Otari Dzidziguri (Note: Pyrukhin listed Otari Dzidziguri as the manager, however no dates were listed for him.)	Soviet Union	1963	1963	(n/a)	(n/a)	(n/a)	(n/a)	(n/a)	(n/a)	(n/a)		
Mykola Melnychenko	Soviet Union	1964	1965	83	22	23	38	66	106	26.51		
Mykola Chyrko	Soviet Union	1966	1966	45	24	18	8	55	34	53.33		
Yevhen Leontovych	Soviet Union	1967	19 July 1967	22	9	3	10	20	26	40.91		
Borys Usenko	Soviet Union	23 July 1967	1967	26	17	4	5	37	12	65.38	Soviet Class B promotion: 1967	
Yosyp Lifshyts	Soviet Union	1968	23 September 1968	33	4	12	14	22	35	21.21		
Borys Usenko	Soviet Union	23 September 1968	1969	54	20	19	15	53	45	37.04		
1970-85 No competitive football was played since the club ceased to exist
Viktor Berest	Soviet Union	1986	10 May 1987	14	7	4	3	23	11	50		
Viktor Fomin	Soviet Union	1987	1988	(n/a)	(n/a)	(n/a)	(n/a)	(n/a)	(n/a)	(n/a)		
Yevhen Kaminskyi	Soviet Union	1989	20 September 1989	(n/a)	(n/a)	(n/a)	(n/a)	(n/a)	(n/a)	(n/a)		
Valeriy Lulko	Soviet Union	20 September 1989	1989	(n/a)	(n/a)	(n/a)	(n/a)	(n/a)	(n/a)	(n/a)		
Yuriy Zakharov	Soviet Union	20 January 1990	28 July 1990	22	8	8	6	20	18	36.36		
Valeriy Lulko	Soviet Union	29 July 1990	May 1991	(n/a)	(n/a)	(n/a)	(n/a)	(n/a)	(n/a)	(n/a)		
Volodymyr Lozynskyi	Ukraine	May 1991	June 1992	18	4	8	6	17	23	22.22		
Boris Streltsov	Russia	July 1992	21 October 1993	41	10	13	18	27	54	24.39		
Tyberiy Korponay	Ukraine	22 October 1993	31 December 1993	6	1	1	4	7	10	16.67		
Evhen Rudakov	Ukraine	March 1994	1 August 1994	21	7	6	20	21	22	33.33		
Tyberiy Korponay	Ukraine	1 August 1994	31 December 1994	11	5	14	36	47	38	36.67		
Anatolii Skurskyi	Ukraine	July 1995	7 August 1995	4	0	1	3	1	6	0		
Tyberiy Korponay	Ukraine	8 August 1995	6 November 1995	13	4	1	8	11	23	30.77		
Valeriy Yaremchenko	Ukraine	11 January 1996	June 1996	17	10	2	5	34	27	58.82		
Mykhailo Byelykh	Ukraine	July 1996	29 July 1997	30	7	3	20	28	57	23.33		
Anatoliy Skurskyi (Note: Interim manager)	Ukraine	July 1997	September 1997	(n/a)	(n/a)	(n/a)	(n/a)	(n/a)	(n/a)	(n/a)		
Yuriy Koval	Ukraine	1998	9 September 1998	(n/a)	(n/a)	(n/a)	(n/a)	(n/a)	(n/a)	(n/a)		
Anatoliy Skurskyi	Ukraine	September 1998	1998	(n/a)	(n/a)	(n/a)	(n/a)	(n/a)	(n/a)	(n/a)		
Semen Osynovskyi	Ukraine	29 January 1999	June 2000	(n/a)	(n/a)	(n/a)	(n/a)	(n/a)	(n/a)	(n/a)		
2001-2003 No competitive football was played since the club ceased to exist
Serhiy Svystun	Ukraine	17 August 2003	31 October 2008	150	(n/a)	(n/a)	(n/a)	(n/a)	(n/a)	(n/a)	2 Poltava Oblast Championship	
Yuriy Chumak	Ukraine	31 October 2008	23 June 2013	129	63	35	31	186	123	48.84		
Serhiy Svystun	Ukraine	24 June 2013	24 June 2015	(n/a)	(n/a)	(n/a)	(n/a)	(n/a)	(n/a)	(n/a)		
Serhiy Yashchenko	Ukraine	25 June 2015	17 June 2018	58	32	12	14	110	60	55.17		
Ihor Stolovytskyi	Ukraine	18 June 2018	18 September 2019	(n/a)	(n/a)	(n/a)	(n/a)	(n/a)	(n/a)	(n/a)		
Volodymyr Prokopynenko	Ukraine	19 September 2019	10 February 2020	(n/a)	(n/a)	(n/a)	(n/a)	(n/a)	(n/a)	(n/a)		
Serhiy Svystun	Ukraine	10 February 2020	12 August 2020	9	3	2	4	7	11	33.33		
Oleksandr Holovko	Ukraine	14 August 2020	11 December 2020	16	5	3	8	15	23	31.25		
Oleksiy Hodin	Ukraine	6 January 2021	30 April 2021	8	0	2	6	4	15	0		
Serhiy Svystun	Ukraine	30 April 2021	22 June 2021	6	1	1	4	4	12	16.67		
Ihor Stolovytskyi	Ukraine	22 June 2021	26 October 2021	15	4	1	10	14	29	26.67		
Roman Loktionov	Ukraine	28 October 2021	24 September 2023	37	9	6	22	42	80	24.32		
Ihor Klymovskyi	Ukraine	27 September 2023	present	0	0	0	0	0	0	0		

== Sources ==
- Pyrukhin, Yurii (n.d.a), Днепр Кременчуг футбол 1963-1969 [Dnipro Kremenchuk football 1963-1969] (in Ukrainian), Kremenchuk
