= 1963 in Soviet football =

Football in the Soviet Union
- Season: 1963

Men's football
- Class A 1. Group: Dinamo Moscow
- Class A 2. Group: Shinnik Yaroslavl
- Class B: Volga Kalinin (Russia); SKA Odessa (Ukraine); Lokomotiv Tbilisi (Union republics)
- Soviet Cup: Spartak Moscow

The 1963 Soviet football championship was the 31st seasons of competitive football in the Soviet Union and the 25th among teams of sports societies and factories. Dinamo won the championship becoming the Soviet domestic champions for the tenth time.

== Honours ==
Competition	Winner	Runner-up
Class A 1. Group	Dinamo Moscow (10*)	Spartak Moscow
Class A 2. Group	Shinnik Yaroslavl (1)	Volga Gorkiy
Class B	Volga Kalinin (Russia)	Dinamo Kirov (Russia)
Class B	SKA Odessa (Ukraine)	Lokomotiv Vinnitsa (Ukraine)
Class B	Lokomotiv Tbilisi (Union republics)	Dinamo Batumi (Union republics)
Soviet Cup	Spartak Moscow (7*)	Shakhter Donetsk

Notes = Number in parentheses is the times that club has won that honour. * indicates new record for competition

== Soviet Union football championship ==
=== Class A First Group ===
Pos	Team	Pld	W	D	L	GF	GA	GD	Pts	Qualification
1	(Russian Soviet Federative Socialist Republic) Dynamo Moscow (C)	38	21	13	4	47	14	+33	55	League champions
2	(Russian Soviet Federative Socialist Republic) Spartak Moscow	38	22	8	8	65	33	+32	52	
3	(Byelorussian Soviet Socialist Republic) Dinamo Minsk	38	18	12	8	47	27	+20	48	
4	(Russian Soviet Federative Socialist Republic) SKA Rostov-on-Don	38	20	7	11	73	40	+33	47	
5	(Georgian Soviet Socialist Republic) Dinamo Tbilisi	38	17	13	8	56	42	+14	47	
6	(Russian Soviet Federative Socialist Republic) Zenit Leningrad	38	14	17	7	45	32	+13	45	
7	(Russian Soviet Federative Socialist Republic) CSKA Moscow	38	14	17	7	39	27	+12	45	
8	(Azerbaijan Soviet Socialist Republic) Neftyanik Baku	38	18	9	11	48	44	+4	45	
9	(Ukrainian Soviet Socialist Republic) Dynamo Kyiv	38	16	12	10	68	48	+20	44	
10	(Russian Soviet Federative Socialist Republic) Torpedo Moscow	38	12	16	10	46	41	+5	40	
11	(Ukrainian Soviet Socialist Republic) Shakhtar Donetsk	38	11	14	13	29	33	−4	36	
12	(Georgian Soviet Socialist Republic) Torpedo Kutaisi	38	6	21	11	22	37	−15	33	
13	(Moldavian Soviet Socialist Republic) Moldova Chisinau	38	8	16	14	27	43	−16	32	
14	(Kazakh Soviet Socialist Republic) Kairat Alma-Ata	38	10	12	16	28	47	−19	32	
15	(Russian Soviet Federative Socialist Republic) Krylya Sovetov Kuybyshev	38	11	7	20	45	53	−8	29	
16	(Russian Soviet Federative Socialist Republic) Dynamo Leningrad (R)	38	7	15	16	37	51	−14	29	Relegation to Class A Second Group
17	(Russian Soviet Federative Socialist Republic) Lokomotiv Moscow (R)	38	5	19	14	37	54	−17	29	Relegation to Class A Second Group
18	(Armenian Soviet Socialist Republic) Ararat Yerevan (R)	38	9	8	21	34	57	−23	26	Relegation to Class A Second Group
19	(Ukrainian Soviet Socialist Republic) Avangard Kharkov (R)	38	6	13	19	25	56	−31	25	Relegation to Class A Second Group
20	(Uzbek Soviet Socialist Republic) Pakhtakor Tashkent (R)	38	4	13	21	44	83	−39	21	Relegation to Class A Second Group

Source: rsssf.com
(C) Champions; (R) Relegated

=== Class A Second Group ===
Pos	Republic	Team	Pld	W	D	L	GF	GA	GD	Pts
1	Russian SFSR	Shinnik Yaroslavl	34	16	13	5	42	19	+23	45
2	Russian SFSR	Volga Gorkiy	0	–	–	–	–	–	—	0
3	Russian SFSR	Trud Voronezh	34	15	12	7	43	26	+17	42
4	Ukrainian SSR	Metallurg Zaporozhie	34	12	17	5	36	17	+19	41
5	Ukrainian SSR	Trudovye rezervy Lugansk	34	15	11	8	41	26	+15	41
6	Ukrainian SSR	Chernomorets Odessa	34	13	13	8	39	31	+8	39
7	Ukrainian SSR	Karpaty Lvov	34	14	11	9	28	22	+6	39
8	Ukrainian SSR	Dnepr Dnepropetrovsk	34	13	10	11	36	34	+2	36
9	Latvian SSR	Daugava Riga	34	13	9	12	38	40	−2	35
10	Russian SFSR	Kuban Krasnodar	34	8	18	8	26	21	+5	34
11	Russian SFSR	Uralmash Sverdlovsk	34	12	8	14	31	40	−9	32
12	Kazakh SSR	Shakhter Karaganda	34	9	12	13	37	46	−9	30
13	Russian SFSR	Lokomotiv Cheliabinsk	34	7	15	12	23	36	−13	29
14	Lithuanian SSR	Zalgiris Vilnius	34	9	10	15	36	42	−6	28
15	Kyrgyz SSR	Alga Frunze	34	8	12	14	28	40	−12	28
16	Russian SFSR	Traktor Volgograd	34	9	9	16	25	40	−15	27
17	Russian SFSR	SKA Novosibirsk	34	2	16	16	15	37	−22	20
18	Byelorussian SSR	Lokomotiv Gomel	34	4	12	18	13	46	−33	14 (Note: 6 points deducted?)

=== Class B ===
==== Russian Federation finals ====
Pos	Team	Pld	W	D	L	GF	GA	GD	Pts
1	Volga Kalinin	3	2	1	0	7	3	+4	5
2	Dynamo Kirov	3	0	3	0	4	4	0	3
3	Zvezda Serpukhov	3	1	1	1	3	5	−2	3
4	Zenit Izhevsk	3	0	1	2	5	7	−2	1

==== Ukraine (playoffs) ====
Each team played against the same ranking team from the other zone. Only the two top pairs that really mattered concerning promotion are listed next. No teams were relegated. SKA Odessa obtained the promotion from the Ukraine zone. They were classified as the Republican champions and were promoted to the Inter-Republican level, the Class A.

- FC Lokomotiv Vinnitsa - SKA Odessa 0:2 0:1
- FC Azovstal Zhdanov - SKA Lvov 0:0 1:0
- FC Zirka Kirovograd - FC Torpedo Kharkov 1:1 0:2
- FC Burevestnik Melitopol - FC Polesie Zhitomir 1:0 1:3
- FC Avangard Ternopol - FC Shakhter Gorlovka 1:1 0:0
- FC Kolgospnik Cherkassy - FC Khimik Severodonetsk 2:1 0:2
- FC Lokomotiv Donetsk - SKA Kiev 0:2 1:2
- FC Stroitel Kherson - FC Shakhter Kadeevka 3:2 0:2
- FC Dynamo Khmelnitskiy - FC Kolgospnik Poltava 5:1 0:1
- FC Arsenal Kiev - FC Dneprovets Dneprodzerzhinsk 3:2 1:2
- FC Desna Chernigov - FC Metallurg Kommunarsk 3:1 1:2
- SCF Sevastopol - FC Spartak Ivano-Frankovsk 2:1 1:4
- FC Verkhovina Uzhgorod - FC Trubnik Nikopol 0:0 1:2
- FC Avangard Zheltye Vody - FC Sudostroitel Nikolaev 1:1 1:0
- FC Avangard Chernovtsy - SC Tavriya Simferopol 6:0 0:1
- FC Avangard Kramatorsk - FC Shakhter Aleksandriya 1:1 0:2
- FC Volyn Lutsk - FC Gornyak Krivoy Rog 0:0 0:3
- FC Kolgospnik Rovno - FC Metallurg Yenakievo 3:1 2:2
- FC Metallurg Kerch - FC Neftyanik Drogobich 0:1 0:0
- FC Dnepr Kremenchug - FC Spartak Sumy 0:0 0:2

==== Union republics finals ====
Dinamo Batumi  0-1 1-5  Lokomotiv Tbilisi 

=== Top goalscorers ===
Class A First Group

- Oleg Kopayev (SKA Rostov-na-Donu) – 27 goals

Class A Second Group

- Anatoliy Isayev (Shinnik Yaroslavl), Viktor Korolkov (Shakhter Karaganda) – 13 goals
