= Otari Dzidziguri =

Soviet football coach (born 1923)

Personal information
- Full name: Otari Shalvovich Dzidziguri
- Date of birth: 6 August 1923
- Place of birth: Tbilisi, Georgian SSR, TSFSR, Soviet Union
- Date of death: death date unknown

Managerial career
- Years: Team
- 1963: Dnipro Kremenchuk
- 1966: Metallurg Almalyk
- 1968: Arai Stepnogorsk
- 1973-1974: Khimik Grodno

Otari Dzidziguri (Georgian: ოთარ ძიძიგური, Russian: Отари Шалвович Дзидзигури; born 6 August 1923 – death date unknown) was a former Soviet army officer, police officer and football coach.

== Early life ==
Dzidziguri was born on 6 August 1923 in Tbilisi, Georgian SSR, TSFSR, Soviet Union.

When Nazi Germany invaded Soviet Union, Dzidziguri was called up for military service by Ordzhonikidze Military commissariat of Tbilisi on 2 September 1942. He began service on 15 September with the rank of Senior lieutenant. From June to December 1943 he was divizion chief of the reconnaissance of the 187th Artillery Regiment of the 60th Guards Rifle Division. He became artillery battery commander of the 666th Artillery Regiment of the 222nd Rifle Division from December 1943 to February 1944 with the rank of captain. His service was finished on 29 November 1951. During the war he was awarded Order of the Red Star, Order of the Patriotic War Second Class, twice Medal "For Courage" and Medal "For the Victory over Germany in the Great Patriotic War 1941–1945". He served in Militsiya in Keda Municipality and Signagi Municipality Georgia.

== Coaching career ==
In 1962 Dzidziguri became an assistant in newly formed Neftyanik Fergana. In the next two years he spent multiple short stints in various clubs. He was coaching in Tashkent Region, Samarkand, Novosibirsk and Kremenchuk. To each of those clubs, he brought his trusted players with him. M. Rozin, head coach of the Football Federation of the Soviet Union described Dzidziguri as "a coach after which grass does not grow". He also stated that "Coaches like that are weeds of football fields, and they certainly have no place in Soviet football". He became a manager at Dnipro in Kremenchuk for the 1963 season replacing Anatolii Sadovskyi. It is unknown when he became manager or when he left, Anatolii Sadovskyi managed every league game. In 1966 he joined Metallurg Almalyk as a manager. His next club was newly created Arai Stepnogorsk in 1968 where he became its first manager. His next team was Dinamo Sukhumi where he was Nachalnik Komandy in 1972. Dzidziguri then joined Khimik Grodno in 1972 as Nachalnik Komandy or a director of team. He was a manager from May 1973 to 11 June 1974. He was replaced by Vladimir Zabolotskikh. He had a very unsuccessful year with the team finishing in last place.

== Awards ==
Order of the Red Star, (Unknown date)
Order of the Patriotic War Second Class, (6 April 1985)
Medal "For Courage", (23 August 1943, Unknown date)
Medal "For the Victory over Germany in the Great Patriotic War 1941–1945", (Unknown date)

== Sources ==
- Pyrukhin, Yurii (n.d.a), Днепр Кременчуг футбол 1963-1969 [Dnipro Kremenchuk football 1963-1969] (in Ukrainian), Kremenchuk
- Pyrukhin, Yurii (n.d.b), Энциклопедия кременчугского футбола [Encyclopedia of Kremenchuk football] (in Russian), Kremenchuk
