= 1964 Soviet Class A Second Group =

Soviet Class A Second Group
- Season: 1964

The 1964 Soviet Class A Second Group was the second season of the Soviet Class A Second Group football competitions that was established in 1963. It was also the 24th season of the Soviet second tier league competition.

== First stage ==
=== First subgroup ===
Pos	Rep	Team	Pld	W	D	L	GF	GA	GD	Pts
1	UKR	Avangard Kharkov	24	12	6	6	30	17	+13	30
2	UKR	Chernomorets Odessa	24	11	7	6	27	21	+6	29
3	LTU	Žalgiris Vilnius	24	10	9	5	30	26	+4	29
4	UKR	Zarya Lugansk (Note: The factory club of Zarya Lugansk was merged with the student club Trudoviye Rezervy Lugansk as Zarya Lugansk.)	24	9	10	5	25	14	+11	28
5	UZB	Pahtakor Tashkent	24	11	5	8	37	25	+12	27
6	RUS	Lokomotiv Chelyabinsk	24	8	10	6	26	21	+5	26
7	LVA	Daugava Riga	24	7	10	7	23	22	+1	24
8	RUS	SKA Novosibirsk	24	8	8	8	22	25	−3	24
9	RUS	Kuban Krasnodar	24	7	9	8	21	21	0	23
10	RUS	Volga Kalinin	24	5	10	9	21	26	−5	20
11	RUS	Dinamo Leningrad	24	6	7	11	20	27	−7	19
12	TKM	Stroitel Ashkhabad	24	6	7	11	21	38	−17	19
13	TJK	Energetik Dushanbe	24	4	6	14	14	34	−20	14

=== Second subgroup ===
Pos	Rep	Team	Pld	W	D	L	GF	GA	GD	Pts
1	UKR	SKA Odessa	26	13	10	3	32	17	+15	36
2	KAZ	Shakhtyor Karaganda	26	11	10	5	33	20	+13	32
3	RUS	Lokomotiv Moskva	26	11	10	5	28	21	+7	32
4	UKR	Karpaty Lvov	26	10	8	8	32	27	+5	28
5	ARM	Ararat Yerevan	26	7	13	6	21	15	+6	27
6	RUS	Trud Voronezh	26	10	7	9	26	27	−1	27
7	GEO	Lokomotiv Tbilisi	26	9	8	9	32	27	+5	26
8	UKR	Metallurg Zaporozhye	26	7	12	7	19	16	+3	26
9	RUS	Traktor Volgograd	26	8	9	9	21	27	−6	25
10	UKR	Dnepr Dnepropetrovsk	26	8	8	10	25	28	−3	24
11	RUS	UralMash Sverdlovsk	26	9	5	12	21	27	−6	23
12	EST	Dinamo Tallinn	26	6	9	11	24	29	−5	21
13	KGZ	Alga Frunze	26	5	9	12	26	46	−20	19
14	BLR	Lokomotiv Gomel	26	3	12	11	8	21	−13	18

== Final stage ==
=== For places 1-14 ===
Pos	Rep	Team	Pld	W	D	L	GF	GA	GD	Pts	Promotion
1	RUS	Lokomotiv Moskva	26	13	9	4	32	23	+9	35	Promoted
2	UKR	SKA Odessa	26	10	13	3	27	19	+8	33	Promoted
3	UZB	Pahtakor Tashkent	26	10	11	5	31	20	+11	31	Promoted
4	UKR	Chernomorets Odessa	26	12	7	7	36	28	+8	31	Promoted
5	LTU	Žalgiris Vilnius	26	9	11	6	33	28	+5	29	
6	UKR	Avangard Kharkov	26	9	8	9	32	27	+5	26	
7	ARM	Ararat Yerevan	26	9	8	9	26	23	+3	26	
8	RUS	Lokomotiv Chelyabinsk	26	8	9	9	22	22	0	25	
9	GEO	Lokomotiv Tbilisi	26	7	10	9	30	30	0	24	
10	UKR	Karpaty Lvov	26	8	8	10	29	36	−7	24	
11	UKR	Zarya Lugansk	26	6	11	9	16	18	−2	23	
12	RUS	Trud Voronezh	26	5	11	10	15	29	−14	21	
13	LVA	Daugava Riga	26	5	10	11	22	30	−8	20	
14	KAZ	Shakhtyor Karaganda	26	3	10	13	15	33	−18	16	

=== For places 15-27 ===
Pos	Rep	Team	Pld	W	D	L	GF	GA	GD	Pts
15	RUS	Kuban Krasnodar	38	14	14	10	33	24	+9	42
16	RUS	Traktor Volgograd	38	14	13	11	35	35	0	41
17	UKR	Metallurg Zaporozhye	38	11	17	10	35	25	+10	39
18	RUS	Dinamo Leningrad	38	14	10	14	46	41	+5	38
19	RUS	SKA Novosibirsk	38	13	12	13	33	34	−1	38
20	RUS	UralMash Sverdlovsk	38	15	8	15	38	43	−5	38
21	TKM	Stroitel Ashkhabad	38	12	12	14	44	51	−7	36
22	UKR	Dnepr Dnepropetrovsk	38	12	11	15	35	41	−6	35
23	EST	Dinamo Tallinn	38	11	9	18	33	39	−6	31
24	RUS	Volga Kalinin	38	9	12	17	30	45	−15	30
25	BLR	Lokomotiv Gomel	38	6	15	17	19	37	−18	27
26	TJK	Energetik Dushanbe	38	8	8	22	25	59	−34	24
27	KGZ	Alga Frunze	38	6	12	20	32	66	−34	24

Source: rsssf.com

== Top scorers ==
20 goals

- Vasyl Moskalenko (Chernomorets Odessa)
- Romualdas Juška (Žalgiris Vilnius)

17 goals

- Mykola Korolyov (Metallist Kharkov)

16 goals

- Gennadi Krasnitsky (Pakhtakor Tashkent)
- Anatoli Koldakov (Chernomorets Odessa)

== Number of teams by republics ==
Number	Union republics	Team(s)
9	Russian SFSR	FC Lokomotiv Moscow, FC Lokomotiv Chelyabinsk, FC Trud Voronezh, FC Kuban Krasnodar, FC Traktor Volgograd, FC Dinamo Leningrad, SKA Novosibirsk, FC UralMash Sverdlovsk, FC Volga Kalinin
8	Ukrainian SSR	SKA Odessa, FC Chernomorets Odessa, FC Avangard Kharkov, FC Karpaty Lvov, FC Zaria Lugansk, FC Metallurg Zaporozhye, FC Dnepr Dnepropetrovsk
1	Uzbek SSR	FC Pakhtakor Tashkent
1	Lithuanian SSR	FK Žalgiris Vilnius
1	Armenian SSR	FC Ararat Yerevan
1	Georgian SSR	FC Lokomotivi Tbilisi
1	Latvian SSR	FC Daugava Riga
1	Kazakh SSR	FC Shakhter Karaganda
1	Turkmen SSR	FC Stroitel Ashkhabat
1	Estonian SSR	FC Dinamo Tallinn
1	Belarusian SSR	FC Lokomotiv Gomel
1	Tajik SSR	FC Energetik Dushanbe
1	Kyrgyz SSR	FC Alga Frunze

== See also ==
- Soviet First League
