= 1937 Football Championship of the Ukrainian SSR =

Football Championship of UkrSSR
- Season: 1937
- Champions: FC Spartak Dnipropetrovsk
- Runner up: FC Zenit Stalino

The 1937 Football Championship of UkrSSR were part of the 1937 Soviet republican football competitions in the Soviet Ukraine.

== Persha Hrupa ==
- Promoted: Kryla Rad Zaporizhia (Druha Hrupa), Sudnobudivnyk-2 Mykolaiv (Druha Hrupa),
- Debut: Spartak Dnipropetrovsk, Vympel Kyiv, Zenit Stalino

Pos	Team	Pld	W	D	L	GF	GA	GR	Pts	Qualification or relegation	FZS	DNI	FSK	FAK	KRZ	S2M	FVK
1	FC Zenit Stalino	6	4	1	1	12	5	2.400	15		—	2–2	2–1	2–0	3–2	0–1	3–2
2	FC Spartak Dnipropetrovsk	6	3	3	0	8	5	1.600	15			—	1–0	1–1	3–1	1–1	+/-
3	FC Stalinets Kharkiv (Note: Last season played as KhEMZ Kharkiv)	6	3	1	2	9	4	2.250	13	Withdrew			—	2–0	1–1	4–0	1–0
4	FC Avanhard Kramatorsk (Note: Last season played as z-d im. Ordzhonikidze Kramatorsk)	6	2	2	2	9	6	1.500	12					—	0–0	3–0	5–1
5	FC Kryla Rad Zaporizhia (Note: Last season played as Zaporizhia)	6	1	3	2	9	10	0.900	11						—	2–2	3–1
6	FC Sudnobudivnyk-2 Mykolaiv	6	1	2	3	6	14	0.429	10	Withdrew						—	2–4
7	FC Vympel Kyiv	6	1	0	5	8	14	0.571	7 (Note: 1 point deducted from Vympel Kyiv points tally for no show to the match with Spartak Dnipropetrovsk)	Withdrew							—

=== Championship play-off ===
- FC Spartak Dnipropetrovsk – FC Zenit Stalino 2:0

== Druha Hrupa ==
Promoted: Stal Dniprodzerzhynsk (Tretia Hrupa), Rot-Front Kryvyi Rih (Tretia Hrupa)

Pos	Team	Pld	W	D	L	GF	GA	GR	Pts	Qualification or relegation	DZV	STL	RFK	AVH	SHS	SPV	SCH
1	Dzerzhynets Voroshylovhrad (Note: Last season played as Voroshylovhrad)	5	4	1	0	21	6	3.500	14	Promoted	—	2–1	7–0	4–4	5–1	3–0	
2	Stal Dniprodzerzhynsk (Note: Last season played as Dniprodzerzhynsk)	5	3	1	1	17	7	2.429	12	Promoted		—	2–2	3–1	7–1	4–1	
3	Rot-Front Kryvyi Rih (Note: Last season played as Kryvyi Rih)	5	3	1	1	6	10	0.600	12	Promoted			—	2–1	1–0	1–0	
4	Avanhard Horlivka (Note: Last season played as Horlivka)	5	2	1	2	13	12	1.083	10					—	2–0	5–3	
5	Stakhanovets Serho (Note: Last season played as Kadiivka)	5	1	0	4	2	15	0.133	7	Withdrew					—	+/-	
6	Spartak Vinnytsia (Note: Last season played as Vinnytsia)	5	0	0	5	4	13	0.308	4 (Note: 1 point deducted for no show)							—	3–2
7	Spartak Chernihiv (Note: Last season played as Chernihiv)	0	–	–	–	–	–	—	0								—

== Tretia Hrupa ==
- Promoted: Voroshylovsk (Chetverta Hrupa), Mohyliv-Podilskyi (Chetverta Hrupa),
- Debut: Tiraspol (debut)

1/4 final

- Voroshylovsk — Kupiansk 7 : 1 (or 7 : 0)
- Poltava — Kherson 4 : 0
- Tiraspol — Zhytomyr 4 : 1
- Kamianets-Podilsk — Mohyliv-Podilskyi + : - (no show)

Consolation matches

1/2 finals

- Kherson — Kupiansk + : — (no show)

Match for 5th place

- Zhytomyr — Kherson 4 : 1 (or 5 : 1)

1/2 finals

- Voroshylovsk — Poltava + : - (no show)
- Tiraspol — Kamianets-Podilskyi 4 : 1

Final

- Voroshylovsk — Tiraspol 4 : 2

== Chetverta Hrupa ==
Debut: Shostka, Konotop

1/4 finals

- Berdychiv — Shostka + : - (no show)
- Sumy — Konotop 1 : 2
- Stal Makiivka — Chystiakove 2 : 1
- Ordzhonikidze — Kremenchuk 5 : 1

Consolation matches

1/2 finals

- Chystiakove — Kremenchuk 1 : 4

Match for the 5th place

- Sumy — Kremenchuk + : - (no show)

1/2 finals

- Berdychiv — Konotop 2 : 1
- Stal Makiivka — Ordzhonikidze 2 : 1

Match for the 3rd place

- Ordzhonikidze — Konotop 7 : 0

Final

- Berdychiv — Stal Makiivka 1 : 5

== Hrupa Pyat A ==
- Relegated: Starobilsk (Chetverta Hrupa), Kirovo (Chetverta Hrupa), Krasnyi Luch (Chetverta Hrupa)
- Debut: Druzhkivka, Sloviansk, Mariupol

1/4 finals

- Sloviansk — Starobilsk 1:2
- Voznesensk — Kirovo 1:0
- Berdyansk — Mariupol +:- (no show)
- Druzhkivka — Krasnyi Luch 3:1

Consolation matches

1/2 finals

- Kirovo — Sloviansk + : - (no show)

Match for the 5th place

- Krasnyi Luch — Kirovo + : - (no show)

1/2 finals

- Starobilsk — Voznesensk 1:2
- Berdyansk — Druzhkivka 2:1

Match for the 3rd place

- Starobilsk — Druzhkivka 0:3

Final

- Voznesensk — Berdyansk 1:0

== Hrupa Pyat B ==
- Relegated: Postysheve (Chetverta Hrupa), Melitopol (Chetverta Hrupa), Korosten (Chetverta Hrupa)
- Debut: Synelnykove, Rubizhne, Koziatyn, Uman

1/4 finals

- Postysheve — Rubizhne 2:1
- Synelnykove — Melitopol +:- (no show)
- Koziatyn — Korosten 1:3
- Novohrad-Volynskyi — Uman 4:2

Consolation matches

1/2 finals

- Uman — Koziatyn + : - (no show)

Match for the 5th place

- Uman — Rubizhne + : - (no show)

1/2 finals

- Postysheve — Synelnykove 7:1
- Korosten — Novohrad-Volynskyi 0:1

Match for the 3rd place

- Korosten — Synelnykove + : - (no show)

Final

- Postysheve — Novohrad-Volynskyi 2:1

== Ukrainian clubs at the All-Union level ==
- Group A (1): Dynamo Kyiv
- Group V (8): Dynamo Odesa, Lokomotyv Kyiv, Stakhanovets Stalino, Dynamo Dnipropetrovsk, Traktor Kharkiv (↑), Spartak Kharkiv, Silmash Kharkiv, Dynamo Kharkiv
- Group G (2): z-d im. Frunze Kostiantynivka, Stal Dnipropetrovsk (debut)
- Group D (3): Lokomotyv Dnipropetrovsk (debut), Sudnobudivnyk Mykolaiv (debut), Spartak Kyiv (debut)

== Withdrawn ==
- (all-Union level) Stal (z-d im. Lenina) Dnipropetrovsk (1936)
- (Republican) UDKA Kiev (1936), z-d im. Stalina Stalino (1936), z-d KinAp Odesa (1936), Artemivsk (1936)

== Number of teams by region ==
Number	Region	Team(s)	
Number	Region	Ukrainian SSR	All-Union
2-3-1-2-7 (2)	Donetsk Oblast	Zenit Stalino, Avanhard Kramatorsk, Dzerzhynets Voroshilovhrad, Avanhard Horlvika, Stakhanovets Serho, Voroshylovsk, Stal Makiivka, Chystiakove, Postysheve, Druzhkivka, Starobilsk, Krasnyi Luch, Mariupol, Sloviansk, Rubizhne	Ugolschiki Stalino, Stal Kostiantynivka
2-2-0-1-3 (3)	Dnipropetrovsk Oblast	Spartak Dnipropetrovsk, Kryla Rad Zaporizhia, Stal Dniprodzerzhynsk, Rot Front Kryvyi Rih, Ordzhonikidze, Berdiansk, Melitopol	Dynamo Dnipropetrovsk, Stal Dnipropetrovsk, Lokomotyv Dnipropetrovsk
1-0-2-2-0 (4)	Kharkiv Oblast	Stalinets Kharkiv, Poltava, Kupiansk, Kremenchuk, Sumy	Silmash Kharkiv, Dynamo Kharkiv, Spartak Kharkiv, Traktornyi z-d Kharkiv
1-0-1-1-3 (3)	Kyiv Oblast	Vympel Kyiv, Zhytomyr, Berdychiv, Novohrad-Volynskyi, Korosten, Uman	Dynamo Kyiv, Lokomotyv Kyiv, Spartak Kyiv
1-0-1-0-2 (2)	Odesa Oblast	Sudnobudivnyk-2 Mykolaiv, Kherson, Voznesensk, Kirovo	Dynamo Odesa, Sudnobudivnyk Mykolaiv
0-1-2-0-1 (0)	Vinnytsia Oblast	Spartak Vinnytsia, Kamianets-Podilsk, Mohyliv-Podilskyi, Koziatyn	–
0-1-0-2-0 (0)	Chernihiv Oblast	Spartak Chernihiv, Konotop, Shostka	–
0-0-1-0-0 (0)	(Moldavian Soviet Socialist Republic) Moldavian ASSR	Tiraspol	–

== See also ==
- 1937 Cup of the Ukrainian SSR
