= FC Spartak Dnipropetrovsk =

FC Spartak Dnipropetrovsk (Ukrainian: Спартак Дніпропетровськ) was an association football team from Dnipropetrovsk (today Dnipro), Ukrainian SSR.

== History ==
The team at Spartak sports society was formed in 1936 (in some sources in 1934) on initiative of Ivan Minakov and was initially called as Promkooperatsia. Among its first trophies was the trophy of "Bolshevistskaya smena" newspaper (Dnipropetrovsk) which the team earned by beating in final game Dynamo Dnipropetrovsk 1:0.

It became the second winner of the Ukrainian republican football championship in 1937 by beating Zenit Stalino in the gold match. According to Vladyslav Rybakov, Spartak Dnipropetrovsk met with Dynamo Kyiv at the final game for Ukrainian champion's title. The winning and the only goal was scored by Leonid Rodos and the Dynamo's goalkeeper Anton Idzkovsky was not able to save the Kievans. The Spartak's 1930s team included such players like goalies Oleksiy Leontyev and Myron Rohachevsky, defenders Mykola Katkov, Tsalik Tsadikov, Anatoliy Dubinin, midfielders Anatoliy Sadovsky, Leonid Rodos, Mykhailo Kolomoyets, Oleksiy Vahonov, forwards Nil Kuntsevych, Samuil Maizel, Mykhailo Cherevatenko, Ivan Teslenko, Petro Luhovy, Mykhailo Diner, Ivan Bashkirov, Mykola Lomakin. Before the war, Spartak competed in Ukrainian competitions in 1938 and 1940, but it placed at the bottom table in both seasons. Beside Ukrainian football competitions, the team also competed in the Soviet Football Cup in 1937 and 1938.

The team was revived after World War II for short period of time, but in 1947 it was merged with Stal Dnipropetrovsk (FC Dnipro).

== Coaches ==
- 1934-1937 Ivan Minakov
- 1937-1937 Viktor Kaminsky
- 1946-1946 Ivan Bashkirov
