= Mykola Prymostka =

Soviet footballer (born 1938)

Personal information
- Full name: Mykola Ilaryonovych Prymostka
- Date of birth: 21 February 1938 (age 88)
- Position: Forward

Senior career*
Years	Team	Apps	(Gls)
1961–1962	Torpedo Kremenchuk	2+	
1962–1965	Dnipro Kremenchuk	35+	(15+)
1965	Hirnyk Kryvyi Rih	18	(1)
1966–1967	Avanhard Kremenchuk	17+	(13+)
- * Club domestic league appearances and goals

Mykola Prymostka (Ukrainian: Микола Іларіонович Примостка, Russian: Николай Илларионович Примостка; born 21 February 1938) is a retired Soviet professional footballer who played as a forward.

== Playing career ==
=== Torpedo Kremenchuk ===
Prymostka became a player for Torpedo Kremenchuk in 1961. He made two appearances in 1962 winter championship.

=== Dnipro Kremenchuk ===
He moved to Dnipro Kremenchuk in summer of 1962. He played in Poltava Oblast Championship and in Poltava Oblast Council Voluntary Sports Society "Avanhard" Championship. He was chosen as best forward in final part of Poltava Oblast Championship. He scored six goals in the final part of regular competition and two goals in three games in final stage. he scored the only goal for Dnipro in play-off game for a spot in Soviet Second League season 1963. During the 1963 season he featured in at least seventeen matches and scored eight goals. He played wearing number nine and ten jerseys. Prymostka Remained with the club for the 1964 season. In that season he played in twenty-seven matches and scored seven. He played in a friendly match against FC Torpedo Moscow on 24 September 1965.

=== Hirnyk Kryvyi Rih ===
In 1965 Prymostka joined Hirnyk Kryvyi Rih. He played in eighteen matches and scored one goal against Kolos Poltava. His name while at Hirnyk was given as Prymostko. In the Kolos match report was it was given as Prymostka by Pyrukhin, while a newspaper report gave his name as Prymostko.

=== Avanhard Kremenchuk ===
Prymostka returned to Kremenchuk to play for Avanhard Kremenchuk in 1966. In Poltava Oblast Championship he played in seventeen matches and scored ten goals. Next season he at least scored twice in the Championship and won the Poltava Oblast Cup. In 1968 he scored at least one goal.

== Sources ==
- Pyrukhin, Yurii (n.d.a), Днепр Кременчуг футбол 1963-1969 [Dnipro Kremenchuk football 1963-1969] (in Ukrainian), Kremenchuk
- Pyrukhin, Yurii (n.d.b), Энциклопедия кременчугского футбола [Encyclopedia of Kremenchuk football] (in Russian), Kremenchuk
