= Borys Konfederat =

Soviet footballer and referee (born 1943)

Personal information
- Full name: Borys Vasylevich Konfederat
- Date of birth: 4 July 1943 (age 83)
- Place of birth: Kirovohrad, Ukrainian SSR
- Height: 1.81 m (5 ft 11 in)
- Position: Goalkeeper

Youth career
- 2016-2018: KhFC Penuel Kryvyi Rih
- 2019-2021: DYuSSh FA Kryvbas Kryvyi Rih

Senior career*
Years	Team	Apps	(Gls)
1960	Zirka Kropyvnytskyi		(0)
1961-1962	Torpedo Kremenchuk		(0)
1963	Dnipro Kremenchuk		(0)
1964	Anhara Irkutsk	18	(0)
1964-1966	Selenga Ulan-Ude	51	(0)
1967	Zenit St Petersburg		(0)
1967-1973	Spartak Vladikavkaz	105	(0)
1971	→ Mashuk Pyatigorsk		(0)
- * Club domestic league appearances and goals as of 25 September 2023

Borys Konfederat (Ukrainian: Борис Васильович Конфедерат, Russian: Борис Васильевич Конфедерат; born 4 July 1943) is a retired Soviet professional footballer who played as a goalkeeper. After retiring he became a referee.

== Playing career ==
Konfederat began playing in lower level of football. His first team was Zirka in his hometown of Kirovohrad. He then moved to neighboring Kremenchuk where he played for Torpedo and Dnipro. He then moved to Anhara. He later played for Selenga which he left in 1966. In 1967 he joined Zenit, he did not make any appearances for the team. From 1967 to 1973 Konfederat played for Spartak.

== Personal life ==
He is father to Andrii Konfederat who was also a goalkeeper and played for Vahonobudivnyk in Kremenchuk.

== Referee ==
After retirement he became a referee in 1977 and took part in at least 122 matches from 1977 to 1991. 75 as an assistant referee and 47 as a referee.

== Honours ==
Spartak

- Soviet First League: 1969

== Sources ==
- Pyrukhin, Yurii (n.d.a), Днепр Кременчуг футбол 1963-1969 [Dnipro Kremenchuk football 1963-1969] (in Ukrainian), Kremenchuk
- Pyrukhin, Yurii (n.d.b), Энциклопедия кременчугского футбола [Encyclopedia of Kremenchuk football] (in Russian), Kremenchuk
