= Yurii Puzikov =

Soviet footballer (born 1937)

Personal information
- Full name: Yurii Mykytovych Puzikov
- Date of birth: 19 August 1937
- Positions: Forward; defender

Senior career*
Years	Team	Apps	(Gls)
1961–1962	Torpedo Kremenchuk	9+	(6+)
1963–1964	Dnipro Kremenchuk	33+	(0)
1965	Lokomotyv Zolotonosha		

Managerial career
- 1990: Spartak Zolotonosha
- * Club domestic league appearances and goals

Yurii Puzikov (Ukrainian: Юрій Микитович Пузіков, Russian: Юрий Никитович Пузиков; born 19 August 1937) is a retired Soviet professional footballer who played as a forward and later as a defender. After retiring he became a coach.

== Playing career ==
Puzikov played for Torpedo Kremenchuk during the 1961 and 1962 seasons. Next season he moved to newly reformed professional club Dnipro Kremenchuk as a forward. He wore number 4 shirt. He played mostly in defense while at the club. He featured a minimum of seven matches in his first season and twenty-six in his second. In 1965 Puzikov joined Lokomotyv from Zolotonosha.

== Coaching career ==
In 1990 Puzikov managed Spartak Zolotonosha. His team became the Cherkasy Oblast Champions.

== Honours ==
=== Manager ===
Spartak Zolotonosha

- Cherkasy Oblast Championship: 1990

== Sources ==
- Pyrukhin, Yurii (n.d.a), Днепр Кременчуг футбол 1963-1969 [Dnipro Kremenchuk football 1963-1969] (in Ukrainian), Kremenchuk
- Pyrukhin, Yurii (n.d.b), Энциклопедия кременчугского футбола [Encyclopedia of Kremenchuk football] (in Russian), Kremenchuk
