= Yevhen Leontovych =

Soviet football coach (born 1932)

Personal information
- Full name: Yevhen Petrovych Leontovych
- Date of birth: 30 July 1932
- Position: Forward

Senior career*
Years	Team	Apps	(Gls)
1955-1958	Zirka Kropyvnytskyi	8+	(1+)

Managerial career
- 1961: Torpedo Kremenchuk
- 1967: Dnipro Kremenchuk
- 1983: SC KrAZ
- * Club domestic league appearances and goals

Yevhen Leontovych (Ukrainian: Євген Петрович Леонтович, Russian: Евгений Петрович Леонтович; born 30 July 1932) is a retired Soviet professional footballer who played as a forward. After retiring he became a coach, referee and wrote for the newspaper.

== Playing career ==
Leontovych played for Zirka Kropyvnytskyi from 1955 to 1958. During 1960 he was playing for Shakhtar Oleksandriya. While managing Torpedo Kremenchuk in 1961 and 1962, he played in at least four matches for Torpedo in 1961 season in Poltava Oblast Championship. He scored at least two goals. On 15 July 1962 Leontovych scored for Dnipro Kremenchuk in a match against Torpedo in Central Council Voluntary Sports Society "Avanhard" Poltava Oblast Championship.

== Coaching career ==
During 1960 Leontovych was an assistant to Dnipro Kremenchuk manager Hryhorii Miroshnyk. Next season he was a manager of Torpedo Kremenchuk. He played in at least four matches for Torpedo in 1961 season in Poltava Oblast Championship. He scored at least two goals. On 15 July 1962 Leontovych scored for Dnipro in a match against Torpedo in Central Council Voluntary Sports Society "Avanhard" Poltava Oblast Championship. On 3 March 1963 he was appointed as an assistant to Dnipro Kremenchuk manager Anatolii Sadovskyi. On 13 September 1964 he played for Veterans of Kremenchuk combined team. In 1966 he was a senior coach of the training group for Dnipro. On 11 March 1967 he was announced as a manager for Dnipro. His last game was on 19 July 1967. In 1970 Leontovych was coaching SC KrAZ youth team who won the Central Council Voluntary Sports Society "Avanhard" Poltava Oblast Championship. He won the Championship again next year. He coached futsal youth school Dnipro DYuSSh-2 in 1981. In 1983 he was managing main team of SC KrAZ.

== Referee career ==
During 1964-65 he became a referee. Leontovych featured as an assistant referee in ten matches featuring Dnipro Kremenchuk. He also took part in one friendly match. His only involvement as a referee in matches with Dnipro was in two friendly matches. On 5 October 1968 he was a referee at another Dnipro friendly.

== Off the field ==
During 1965 Leontovych wrote match reports for the Avtobudivnyk (Car Builder) newspaper in Kremenchuk. In 1967 he wrote for the Football newspaper.

== Sources ==
- Pyrukhin, Yurii (n.d.a), Днепр Кременчуг футбол 1963-1969 [Dnipro Kremenchuk football 1963-1969] (in Ukrainian), Kremenchuk
- Pyrukhin, Yurii (n.d.b), Энциклопедия кременчугского футбола [Encyclopedia of Kremenchuk football] (in Russian), Kremenchuk
