= Yevsevii Vaks =

Soviet footballer (born 1943)

Personal information
- Full name: Yevsevii Samuilovych Vaks
- Date of birth: 1943 (age 82–83)
- Position: Forward

Senior career*
Years	Team	Apps	(Gls)
1961	Dnipro Kremenchuk	3+	(0)
1962	Kolhospnyk Poltava	12	(1)
1963	Dnipro Kremenchuk	12+	(6)
1964	Avanhard Kremenchuk		
- * Club domestic league appearances and goals

Yevsevii Vaks (Ukrainian: Євсевій Самуїлович Вакс; born 1943) is a retired Soviet professional footballer who played as a forward.

== Playing career ==
Vaks joined Dnipro Kremenchuk in 1961. He played in three matches of the final part of Poltava Oblast Championship. In January 1962 he moved to Kolhospnyk Poltava. He played in ten regular season games and two play-off games and scored one goal. He was criticized for not having enough technical skills with the ball. In March 1963 Vaks made his return to Dnipro Kremenchuk who now became a professional team. He wore jersey number eleven during the season. He played in at least twelve matches and scored six goals. Vaks joined Kremenchuk team Avanhard in early 1964.

== Sources ==
- Pyrukhin, Yurii (n.d.a), Днепр Кременчуг футбол 1963-1969 [Dnipro Kremenchuk football 1963-1969] (in Ukrainian), Kremenchuk
- Pyrukhin, Yurii (n.d.b), Энциклопедия кременчугского футбола [Encyclopedia of Kremenchuk football] (in Russian), Kremenchuk
