= 1963 Soviet Cup =

1963 Cup of USSR in Football
Кубок СССР

Tournament details
- Country: Soviet Union
- Dates: April 7 – August 10
- Teams: 48 (final stage)

Final positions
- Champions: Spartak Moscow
- Runners-up: Shakhter Donetsk

The 1963 Soviet Cup was an association football cup competition of the Soviet Union.

== Participating teams ==
Enter in Final round		Enter in Qualification round		
Class A		Class B 148/151 teams		
Group 1 20/20 teams ✓ Dinamo Moscow; ✓ Spartak Moscow; ✓ Dinamo Minsk; ✓ SKA Rostov-na-Donu; ✓ Dinamo Tbilisi; ✓ Zenit Leningrad; ✓ CSKA Moscow; ✓ Neftianik Baku; ✓ Dinamo Kiev; ✓ Torpedo Moscow; ✓ Shakhter Donetsk; ✓ Torpedo Kutaisi; ✓ Moldova Kishenev; ✓ Kairat Alma-Ata; ✓ Krylya Sovetov Kuibyshev; ✓ Dinamo Leningrad; ✓ Lokomotiv Moscow; ✓ Ararat Yerevan; ✓ Avangard Kharkov; ✓ Pakhtakor Tashkent	Group 2 18/18 teams ✓ Shinnik Yaroslavl; ✓ Volga Gorkiy; ✓ Trud Voronezh; ✓ Metallurg Zaporozhye; ✓ Trudovye Rezervy Lugansk; ✓ Chernomorets Odessa; ✓ Karpaty Lvov; ✓ Dnepr Dnepropetrovsk; ✓ Daugava Riga; ✓ Kuban Krasnodar; ✓ Uralmash Sverdlovsk; ✓ Shakhter Karaganda; ✓ Lokomotiv Chelyabinsk; ✓ Zhalgiris Vilnius; ✓ Alga Frunze; ✓ Traktor Volgograd; ✓ SKA Novosibirsk; ✓ Lokomotiv Gomel	RSFSR I ✓ Zvezda Serpukhov; ✓ Volga Kalinin; ✓ Spartak Leningrad; ✓ Trud Noginsk; ✓ Traktor Vladimir; ✓ Spartak Oryol; ✓ Spartak Ryazan; ✓ Dinamo Bryansk; ✓ Trudovye Rezervy Kursk; ✓ Vympel Kaliningrad; ✓ Shakhter Tula; ✓ Serp i Molot Moscow; ✓ Metallurg Cherepovets; ✓ Onezhets Petrozavodsk; ✓ Tralflotovets Murmansk; ✓ Sputnik Kaluga	RSFSR II ✓ Tekstilschik Ivanovo; ✓ Tekstilschik Kostroma; ✓ Khimik Novomoskovsk; ✓ Baltika Kaliningrad; ✓ Znamia Truda Orekhovo-Zuyevo; ✓ Volna Dzerzhinsk; ✓ Avangard Kolomna; ✓ Neftianik Syzran; ✓ SKA Leningrad; ✓ Torpedo Lipetsk; ✓ Torpedo Pavlovo; ✓ Spartak Smolensk; ✓ Volga Ulyanovsk; ✓ Energiya Voronezh; ✓ Zaria Penza; ✓ Spartak Tambov; ✓ Spartak Saransk	RSFSR III ✓ Sokol Saratov; ✓ Terek Grozny; ✓ Torpedo Armavir; ✓ Shakhter Shakhty; ✓ Torpedo Taganrog; ✓ Energiya Volzhskiy; ✓ Spartak Ordzhonikidze; ✓ Rostselmash Rostov-na-Donu; ✓ Progress Kamensk-Shaktinskiy; ✓ Dinamo Stavropol; ✓ Dinamo Makhachkala; ✓ Urozhai Maikop; ✓ Tsement Novorossiysk; ✓ Trudovye Rezervy Kislovodsk; ✓ Spartak Nalchik; ✓ Volgar Astrakhan
Group 1 20/20 teams ✓ Dinamo Moscow; ✓ Spartak Moscow; ✓ Dinamo Minsk; ✓ SKA Rostov-na-Donu; ✓ Dinamo Tbilisi; ✓ Zenit Leningrad; ✓ CSKA Moscow; ✓ Neftianik Baku; ✓ Dinamo Kiev; ✓ Torpedo Moscow; ✓ Shakhter Donetsk; ✓ Torpedo Kutaisi; ✓ Moldova Kishenev; ✓ Kairat Alma-Ata; ✓ Krylya Sovetov Kuibyshev; ✓ Dinamo Leningrad; ✓ Lokomotiv Moscow; ✓ Ararat Yerevan; ✓ Avangard Kharkov; ✓ Pakhtakor Tashkent	Group 2 18/18 teams ✓ Shinnik Yaroslavl; ✓ Volga Gorkiy; ✓ Trud Voronezh; ✓ Metallurg Zaporozhye; ✓ Trudovye Rezervy Lugansk; ✓ Chernomorets Odessa; ✓ Karpaty Lvov; ✓ Dnepr Dnepropetrovsk; ✓ Daugava Riga; ✓ Kuban Krasnodar; ✓ Uralmash Sverdlovsk; ✓ Shakhter Karaganda; ✓ Lokomotiv Chelyabinsk; ✓ Zhalgiris Vilnius; ✓ Alga Frunze; ✓ Traktor Volgograd; ✓ SKA Novosibirsk; ✓ Lokomotiv Gomel	RSFSR IV ✓ Dinamo Kirov; ✓ Zenit Izhevsk; ✓ Iskra Kazan; ✓ Stroitel Ufa; ✓ Metallurg Kuibyshev; ✓ Zvezda Perm; ✓ Metallurg Magnitogorsk; ✓ Uralets Nizhniy Tagil; ✓ Salyut Kamensk-Uralskiy; ✓ Progress Zelenodolsk; ✓ Khimik Berezniki; ✓ Stroitel Kurgan; ✓ Spartak Yoshkar-Ola; ✓ Lokomotiv Orenburg; ✓ Geolog Tyumen; ✓ Khimik Salavat	RSFSR V ✓ Temp Barnaul; ✓ Irtysh Omsk; ✓ Avangard Komsomolsk-na-Amure; ✓ Luch Vladivostok; ✓ Khimik Kemerovo; ✓ Angara Irkutsk; ✓ Tomich Tomsk; ✓ Amur Blagoveschensk; ✓ Lokomotiv Krasnoyarsk; ✓ SKA Khabarovsk; ✓ Start Angarsk; ✓ Zabaikalets Chita; ✓ Shakhter Prokopyevsk; ✓ Sibselmash Novosibirsk; ✓ Baikal Ulan-Ude	UkrSSR I ✓ Lokomotiv Vinnitsa; ✓ SKA Lvov; ✓ Zvezda Kirovograd; ✓ Polesie Zhitomir; ✓ Avangard Ternopol; ✓ Kolgospnik Cherkassy; ✓ SKA Kiev; ✓ Stroitel Kherson; ✓ Dinamo Khmelnitskiy; ✓ Arsenal Kiev; ✓ Desna Chernigov; ✓ Spartak Ivano-Frankivsk; ✓ Verkhovina Uzhgorod; ✓ Sudostoitel Nikolayev; ✓ Avangard Chernovtsy; ✓ Shakhter Aleksandria; ✓ Volyn Lutsk; ✓ Kolgospnik Rovno; ✓ Neftianik Drogobich; ✓ Dnepr Kremenchuk
Group 1 20/20 teams ✓ Dinamo Moscow; ✓ Spartak Moscow; ✓ Dinamo Minsk; ✓ SKA Rostov-na-Donu; ✓ Dinamo Tbilisi; ✓ Zenit Leningrad; ✓ CSKA Moscow; ✓ Neftianik Baku; ✓ Dinamo Kiev; ✓ Torpedo Moscow; ✓ Shakhter Donetsk; ✓ Torpedo Kutaisi; ✓ Moldova Kishenev; ✓ Kairat Alma-Ata; ✓ Krylya Sovetov Kuibyshev; ✓ Dinamo Leningrad; ✓ Lokomotiv Moscow; ✓ Ararat Yerevan; ✓ Avangard Kharkov; ✓ Pakhtakor Tashkent	Group 2 18/18 teams ✓ Shinnik Yaroslavl; ✓ Volga Gorkiy; ✓ Trud Voronezh; ✓ Metallurg Zaporozhye; ✓ Trudovye Rezervy Lugansk; ✓ Chernomorets Odessa; ✓ Karpaty Lvov; ✓ Dnepr Dnepropetrovsk; ✓ Daugava Riga; ✓ Kuban Krasnodar; ✓ Uralmash Sverdlovsk; ✓ Shakhter Karaganda; ✓ Lokomotiv Chelyabinsk; ✓ Zhalgiris Vilnius; ✓ Alga Frunze; ✓ Traktor Volgograd; ✓ SKA Novosibirsk; ✓ Lokomotiv Gomel	UkrSSR II ✓ SKA Odessa; ✓ Azovstal Zhdanov; ✓ Torpedo Kharkov; ✓ Burevestnik Melitopol; ✓ Shakhter Gorlovka; ✓ Khimik Severodonetsk; ✓ Lokomotiv Donetsk; ✓ Shakhter Kadiyevka; ✓ Kolgospnik Poltava; ✓ Dneprovets Dneprodzerzhinsk; ✓ Metallurg Kommunarsk; ✓ SKF Sevastopol; ✓ Trubnik Nikopol; ✓ Avangard Zholtye Vody; ✓ Tavriya Simferopol; ✓ Avangard Kramatorsk; ✓ Gornyak Krivoi Rog; ✓ Metallurg Yenakievo; ✓ Metallurg Kerch; ✓ Spartak Sumy	Union republics I ✓ Dinamo Batumi; ✓ Lori Kirovakan; ✓ Dinamo Kirovabad; ✓ Metallurg Rustavi; ✓ Dinamo Tallinn; ✓ Dinamo Sukhumi; ✓ Zveinieks Liyepaya; ✓ Lucaferule Tiraspol; ✓ Nairi Yerevan; ✓ Dvina Vitebsk; ✓ Spartak Mogilev; ✓ SKA Minsk; ✓ Nistrul Bendery; ✓ Granitas Klaipeda; ✓ Spartak Brest; ✓ Stroitel Beltsy	Union republics II ✓ Lokomotiv Tbilisi; ✓ Shirak Leninakan; ✓ Kolkhida Poti; ✓ Metallurg Chimkent; ✓ Khimik Chirchik; ✓ Energetik Dushanbe; ✓ Pamir Leninabad; ✓ Metallist Jambul; ✓ Spartak Samarkand; ✓ Vostok Ust-Kamenogors; ✓ ADK Alma-Ara; ✓ Neftianik Fergana; ✗ Stroitel Ashkhabad; ✗ Politodel Tashkent Oblast; ✗ Khimik Sumgait

Source: []

== Competition schedule ==
=== Preliminary stage ===
==== Group 1 (Russian Federation) ====
===== First round =====
DINAMO Bryansk                1-0  Trud Noginsk 
Metallurg Cherepovets         1-2  SPARTAK Leningrad 
Shakhtyor Tula                0-1  VOLGA Kalinin 
SPARTAK Oryol                 1-0  Onezhets Petrozavodsk 
Spartak Ryazan                0-0  Zvezda Serpukhov 
Sputnik Kaluga                1-2  VYMPEL Kaliningrad (M.R.) 
TRAKTOR Vladimir              2-0  Tralflotovets Murmansk 
TRUDOVIYE REZERVY Kursk       1-0  Serp i Molot Moskva

====== First round replays ======
Spartak Ryazan                0-0  Zvezda Serpukhov 
Spartak Ryazan                0-1  ZVEZDA Serpukhov

===== Quarterfinals =====
Dinamo Bryansk                0-0  Volga Kalinin 
SPARTAK Leningrad             2-1  Spartak Oryol 
TRUDOVIYE REZERVY Kursk       1-0  Traktor Vladimir 
Vympel Kaliningrad (M.R.)     1-2  ZVEZDA Serpukhov

====== Quarterfinals replays ======
Dinamo Bryansk                1-2  VOLGA Kalinin

===== Semifinals =====
VOLGA Kalinin                 2-0  Spartak Leningrad 
ZVEZDA Serpukhov              8-1  Trudoviye Rezervy Kursk

===== Final =====
VOLGA Kalinin                 2-1  Zvezda Serpukhov           [aet]

==== Group 2 (Russian Federation) ====
===== Preliminary round =====
Torpedo Lipetsk               1-2  SKA Leningrad              [aet]

===== First round =====
AVANGARD Kolomna              1-0  Volna Dzerzhinsk 
Khimik Novomoskovsk           1-2  SPARTAK Smolensk 
Neftyanik Syzran              1-1  Baltika Kaliningrad 
SPARTAK Saransk               2-1  Energiya Voronezh 
Spartak Tambov                1-3  SKA Leningrad 
ZARYA Penza                   1-0  Volga Ulyanovsk 
TEXTILSHCHIK Ivanovo          3-2  Torpedo Pavlovo 
Znamya Truda Orekhovo-Zuyevo  2-2  Textilshchik Kostroma

====== First round replays ======
NEFTYANIK Syzran              1-0  Baltika Kaliningrad 
Znamya Truda Orekhovo-Zuyevo  1-2  TEXTILSHCHIK Kostroma

===== Quarterfinals =====
Spartak Saransk               0-2  NEFTYANIK Syzran 
Textilshchik Ivanovo          1-1  Spartak Smolensk  
Textilshchik Kostroma         0-0  Avangard Kolomna 
Zarya Penza                   1-3  SKA Leningrad

====== Quarterfinals replays ======
TEXTILSHCHIK Ivanovo          1-0  Spartak Smolensk  
TEXTILSHCHIK Kostroma         2-1  Avangard Kolomna           [aet]

===== Semifinals =====
SKA Leningrad                 2-0  Neftyanik Syzran 
TEXTILSHCHIK Ivanovo          3-1  Textilshchik Kostroma

===== Final =====
Textilshchik Ivanovo          1-2  SKA Leningrad     [in Kalinin]

==== Group 3 (Russian Federation) ====
===== First round =====
DINAMO Makhachkala            2-1  Spartak Nalchik 
PROGRESS Kamensk              2-1  Cement Novorossiysk 
SHAKHTYOR Shakhty             2-1  Dinamo Stavropol 
SPARTAK Orjonikidze           3-1  Energiya Volzhskiy 
TEREK Grozny                  2-1  Sokol Saratov               [aet] 
Torpedo Armavir               1-2  TORPEDO Taganrog 
Urozhai Maykop                1-3  ROSTSELMASH Rostov-na-Donu 
Volgar Astrakhan              0-4  TRUDOVIYE REZERVY Kislovodsk

===== Quarterfinals =====
DINAMO Makhachkala            2-0  Trudoviye Rezervy Kislovodsk 
Progress Kamensk              0-1  SHAKHTYOR Shakhty 
TEREK Grozny                  3-1  Spartak Orjonikidze 
Torpedo Taganrog              1-1  RostSelMash Rostov-na-Donu

====== Quarterfinals replays ======
Torpedo Taganrog              1-1  RostSelMash Rostov-na-Donu 
TORPEDO Taganrog              2-0  RostSelMash Rostov-na-Donu

===== Semifinals =====
SHAKHTYOR Shakhty             3-2  Torpedo Taganrog 
Terek Grozny                  1-2  DINAMO Makhachkala          [aet]

===== Final =====
SHAKHTYOR Shakhty             2-1  Dinamo Makhachkala

==== Group 4 (Russian Federation) ====
===== First round =====
GEOLOG Tyumen                 1-0  Zvezda Perm 
ISKRA Kazan                   1-0  Uralets Nizhniy Tagil 
KHIMIK Salavat                2-1  Zenit Izhevsk 
LOKOMOTIV Orenburg            2-1  Metallurg Kuibyshev 
METALLURG Magnitogorsk        3-0  Salyut Kamensk-Uralskiy 
Spartak Yoshkar-Ola           1-1  Progress Zelyonodolsk 
STROITEL Kurgan               2-1  Khimik Berezniki 
Stroitel Ufa                  0-1  DINAMO Kirov

====== First round replays ======
Spartak Yoshkar-Ola           0-1  PROGRESS Zelyonodolsk       [aet]

===== Quarterfinals =====
DINAMO Kirov                  3-1  Lokomotiv Orenburg 
GEOLOG Tyumen                 1-0  Stroitel Kurgan 
ISKRA Kazan                   3-1  Progress Zelyonodolsk 
METALLURG Magnitogorsk        3-1  Khimik Salavat

===== Semifinals =====
DINAMO Kirov                  2-1  Metallurg Magnitogorsk 
ISKRA Kazan                   5-0  Geolog Tyumen

===== Final =====
ISKRA Kazan                   4-2  Dinamo Kirov                [aet]

==== Group 5 (Russian Federation) ====
===== First round =====
Avangard Komsomolsk-na-Amure  0-1  SKA Khabarovsk              [aet] 
IRTYSH Omsk                   5-0  Tomich Tomsk                [aet] 
KHIMIK Kemerovo               2-1  Shakhtyor Prokopyevsk 
Luch Vladivostok              1-1  Amur Blagoveshchensk 
SibSelMash Novosibirsk        2-6  TEMP Barnaul 
Start Angarsk                 1-1  Angara Irkutsk 
ZABAIKALETS Chita             2-1  Baykal Ulan-Ude

====== First round replays ======
Luch Vladivostok              0-1  AMUR Blagoveshchensk 
START Angarsk                 3-1  Angara Irkutsk

===== Quarterfinals =====
LOKOMOTIV Krasnoyarsk         1-0  Khimik Kemerovo             [aet] 
SKA Khabarovsk                1-0  Amur Blagoveshchensk 
TEMP Barnaul                  1-0  Irtysh Omsk 
Zabaikalets Chita             0-2  START Angarsk

===== Semifinals =====
Start Angarsk                 1-2  SKA Khabarovsk              [aet] 
TEMP Barnaul                  1-0  Lokomotiv Krasnoyarsk       [aet]

===== Final =====
SKA Khabarovsk                2-0  Temp Barnaul

==== Group 1 (Ukraine) ====
===== First round =====
DESNA Chernigov               1-0  Volyn Lutsk 
DINAMO Khmelnitskiy           3-2  SKA Lvov 
POLESYE Zhitomir              3-0  Kolhospnik Rovno 
SKA Kiev                      2-1  Avangard Ternopol 
SPARTAK Ivano-Frankovsk       1-0  Lokomotiv Vinnitsa

===== Quarterfinals =====
Avangard Chernovtsy           0-2  SKA Kiev 
POLESYE Zhitomir              1-0  Desna Chernigov 
SPARTAK Ivano-Frankovsk       2-0  Dinamo Khmelnitskiy 
VERKHOVINA Uzhgorod           2-1  Neftyanik Drogobych

===== Semifinals =====
Polesye Zhitomir              2-3  SKA Kiev                    [aet] 
Verkhovina Uzhgorod           1-2  SPARTAK Ivano-Frankovsk

===== Final =====
SPARTAK Ivano-Frankovsk       2-1  SKA Kiev

==== Group 2 (Ukraine) ====
===== First round =====
AzovStal Zhdanov              1-2  SHAKHTYOR Kadiyevka 
BUREVESTNIK Melitopol         1-0  Spartak Sumy 
LOKOMOTIV Donetsk             2-0  Metallurg Kerch 
Shakhtyor Gorlovka            0-2  TORPEDO Kharkov 
SKF Sevastopol                2-1  Metallurg Kommunarsk 
TAVRIA Simferopol             3-0  Avangard Kramatorsk

===== Quarterfinals =====
KHIMIK Severodonetsk          2-0  Burevestnik Melitopol 
Metallurg Yenakiyevo          1-2  SKF Sevastopol 
SHAKHTYOR Kadiyevka           1-0  Torpedo Kharkov             [aet] 
TAVRIA Simferopol             1-0  Lokomotiv Donetsk

===== Semifinals =====
Shakhtyor Kadiyevka           0-1  KHIMIK Severodonetsk        [aet] 
SKF Sevastopol                2-0  Tavria Simferopol

===== Final =====
SKF Sevastopol                1-2  KHIMIK Severodonetsk

==== Group 3 (Ukraine) ====
===== First round =====
AVANGARD Zholtyye Vody        2-0  Dneprovets Dneprodzerzhinsk 
KOLHOSPNIK Cherkassy          1-0  Zvezda Kirovograd           [aet] 
SHAKHTYOR Alexandria          2-1  Dnepr Kremenchug 
STROITEL Kherson              2-0  Kolhospnik Poltava 
SUDOSTROITEL Nikolayev        2-1  Arsenal Kiev

===== Quarterfinals =====
KOLHOSPNIK Cherkassy          2-1  Shakhtyor Alexandria        [aet] 
SKA Odessa                    4-0  Gornyak Krivoi Rog 
Stroitel Kherson              0-0  Avangard Zholtyye Vody 
Trubnik Nikopol               0-2  SUDOSTROITEL Nikolayev

====== Quarterfinals replays ======
Stroitel Kherson              1-2  AVANGARD Zholtyye Vody

===== Semifinals =====
Avangard Zholtyye Vody        0-1  SKA Odessa 
SUDOSTROITEL Nikolayev        2-0  Kolhospnik Cherkassy

===== Final =====
Sudostroitel Nikolayev        0-1  SKA Odessa

==== Group 1 (Union republics) ====
===== First round =====
DINAMO Batumi                 1-0  Stroitel Beltsy 
DINAMO Kirovabad              1-0  Zvejnieks Liepaja           [aet] 
KHIMIK Mogilyov               1-0  Dvina Vitebsk 
Metallurg Rustavi             2-3  LUCHAFERUL Tiraspol         [aet] 
NAIRI Yerevan                 2-0  Dinamo Sukhumi 
NISTRUL Bendery               1-0  Lori Kirovakan              [aet] 
SKA Minsk                     0-1  DINAMO Tallinn 
Spartak Brest                 0-2  GRANITAS Klaipeda

===== Quarterfinals =====
DINAMO Tallinn                2-0  Nistrul Bendery 
GRANITAS Klaipeda             3-2  Khimik Mogilyov 
LUCHAFERUL Tiraspol           2-0  Dinamo Kirovabad 
NAIRI Yerevan                 1-0  Dinamo Batumi

===== Semifinals =====
DINAMO Tallinn                5-0  Granitas Klaipeda 
NAIRI Yerevan                 5-1  Luchaferul Tiraspol

===== Final =====
DINAMO Tallinn                3-2  Nairi Yerevan

==== Group 2 (Union republics) ====
===== First round =====
Neftyanik Fergana             0-1  KHIMIK Chirchik 
PAMIR Leninabad               1-0  Metallist Jambul 
Shirak Leninakan              2-2  Lokomotiv Tbilisi 
Vostok Ust-Kamenogorsk        0-1  KOLKHIDA Poti

====== First round replays ======
SHIRAK Leninakan              2-0  Lokomotiv Tbilisi

===== Quarterfinals =====
ADK Alma-Ata                  0-2  SPARTAK Samarkand 
ENERGETIK Dushanbe            3-2  Metallurg Chimkent 
KHIMIK Chirchik               1-0  Pamir Leninabad             [aet]
KOLKHIDA Poti                 1-0  Shirak Leninakan

===== Semifinals =====
Kolkhida Poti                 1-2  ENERGETIK Dushanbe 
SPARTAK Samarkand             1-0  Khimik Chirchik

===== Final =====
SPARTAK Samarkand             3-2  Energetik Dushanbe

=== Final stage ===
==== Preliminary round ====
[May 25] 
KHIMIK Severodonetsk          2-0  Kuban Krasnodar 
SHAKHTYOR Shakhty             4-1  Alga Frunze 
SKA Leningrad                 2-1  Chernomorets Odessa 
  [R.Lapshin, V.Kondrashkin – A.Dvoyenkov pen] 
Spartak Samarkand             2-3  SHAKHTYOR Karaganda 
  [? – Ignatyev 21, 36, Yulgushov 32]

==== First round ====
[May 29] 
SKA Odessa                    1-0  Karpaty Lvov 
  [O.Shchupakov 54] 
[Jun 8] 
DINAMO Tallinn                w/o  UralMash Sverdlovsk 
Iskra Kazan                   1-2  METALLURG Zaporozhye        [aet] 
  [? – Kovalenko, Shchegolikhin] 
SKA Leningrad                 0-0  Khimik Severodonetsk 
Spartak Ivano-Frankovsk       0-2  DAUGAVA Riga 
[Jun 11] 
SHAKHTYOR Karaganda           2-0  Shakhtyor Shakhty           [aet] 
  [Korolkov-2 (1 pen)] 
[Jun 12] 
Dnepr Dnepropetrovsk          2-2  Žalgiris Vilnius 
  [Gurkin 20, Sukovitsyn 110 pen – R.Konofatskiy (D) 88 og, ?] 
Lokomotiv Gomel               3-3  Lokomotiv Chelyabinsk 
  [V.Pivovarov (LC) 15 og, G.Tsiburevkin 17, L.Yerokhovets 90 – G.Yepishin 21, G.Korotayev 66, Smirnov 84] 
Shinnik Yaroslavl             0-0  Volga Gorkiy 
SKA Khabarovsk                2-0  Traktor Volgograd 
SKA Novosibirsk               1-0  Trudoviye Rezervy Lugansk 
  [L.Karpov 8] 
Volga Kalinin                 1-1  Trud Voronezh

===== First round replays =====
[Jun 9] 
SKA Leningrad                 2-1  Khimik Severodonetsk        [aet] 
[Jun 13] 
Dnepr Dnepropetrovsk          1-2  ŽALGIRIS Vilnius            [aet] 
  [Nesterov - ?] 
Lokomotiv Gomel               0-0  Lokomotiv Chelyabinsk 
SHINNIK Yaroslavl             3-1  Volga Gorkiy 
  [Anatoliy Isayev-2, Genrikh Fedosov - ?] 
VOLGA Kalinin                 2-1  Trud Voronezh 
[Jun 15] 
LOKOMOTIV Gomel               3-1  Lokomotiv Chelyabinsk 
  [M.Khovrin-2, V.Korotkevich – G.Yepishin]

==== Second round ====
[May 23] 
TORPEDO Moskva                2-0  Ararat Yerevan 
  [Nemecio Pozuelo 25, Alexandr Medakin 85] 
[Jun 15] 
CSKA Moskva                   0-1  SHAKHTYOR Donetsk 
  [Valentin Sapronov 57] 
[Jun 16] 
DAUGAVA Riga                  3-0  Avangard Kharkov 
DINAMO Leningrad              5-1  Pahtakor Tashkent 
Dinamo Tallinn                0-0  Krylya Sovetov Kuibyshev 
METALLURG Zaporozhye          1-0  SKA Rostov-na-Donu 
  [Kovalenko 82] 
SHAKHTYOR Karaganda           3-0  Zenit Leningrad 
  [E.Avakov 8, V.Chuvakov 15, V.Korolkov 60] 
Shinnik Yaroslavl             0-3  SPARTAK Moskva 
  [Yuriy Falin 31, Galimzyan Husainov 33, Yuriy Sevidov 41] 
SKA Khabarovsk                1-1  Torpedo Kutaisi 
  [V.Sadovnikov - ?] 
SKA Leningrad                 0-1  KAYRAT Alma-Ata 
SKA Novosibirsk               3-1  Neftyanik Baku              [aet] 
SKA Odessa                    0-1  DINAMO Moskva 
  [Yuriy Vshivtsev 69 pen] 
VOLGA Kalinin                 4-2  Dinamo Tbilisi              [aet] 
  [V.Orekhov-2, I.Abramov-2 – Zaur Kaloyev-2] 
Žalgiris Vilnius              2-4  MOLDOVA Kishinev 
[Jun 17] 
DINAMO Kiev                   2-0  Lokomotiv Moskva 
  [Viktor Serebryanikov 48, Oleg Bazilevich 87] 
DINAMO Minsk                  3-0  Lokomotiv Gomel 
  [Mikhail Mustygin-2, Eduard Malofeyev]

===== Second round replays =====
[Jun 17] 
DINAMO Tallinn                3-1  Krylya Sovetov Kuibyshev 
SKA Khabarovsk                1-0  Torpedo Kutaisi             [aet] 
  [B.Semyonov pen]

==== Third round ====
[Jun 28] 
Daugava Riga                  0-1  DINAMO Minsk 
  [Leonard Adamov 6] 
DINAMO Leningrad              2-1  Volga Kalinin 
  [Anatoliy Boitsov, Viktor Nikolayev – V.Orekhov] 
KAYRAT Alma-Ata               3-1  Metallurg Zaporozhye 
  [Oleg Maltsev 31, 33, Vadim Stepanov 66 – B.Sokolov 44] 
MOLDOVA Kishinev              2-0  Dinamo Tallinn 
SHAKHTYOR Donetsk             4-1  Torpedo Moskva 
  [Anatoliy Rodin 27, 57, 62, Yuriy Ananchenko ? – Alexandr Abayev 80] 
SKA Khabarovsk                1-0  SKA Novosibirsk 
  [B.Semyonov 20 pen] 
SPARTAK Moskva                1-0  Dinamo Kiev 
  [Galimzyan Husainov 8] 
[Jun 29] 
DINAMO Moskva                 2-1  Shakhtyor Karaganda 
  [Yuriy Vshivtsev 33, Nikolai Bobkov 38 – V.Korolkov 49]

==== Quarterfinals ====
[Jul 17] 
SHAKHTYOR Donetsk             2-1  SKA Khabarovsk 
  [Mikhail Ivanov 73, Mikhail Zakharov 87 – V.Sadovnikov 13] 
[Jul 26] 
Moldova Kishinev              1-1  Kayrat Alma-Ata 
  [Valeriy Kolbasyuk ? – Sergei Kvochkin 22] 
[Aug 3] 
Dinamo Minsk                  0-2  DINAMO Moskva               [aet] 
  [Arkadiy Nikolayev 101, Yuriy Vshivtsev 119] 
SPARTAK Moskva                4-1  Dinamo Leningrad 
  [Yuriy Falin 32, Gennadiy Logofet ?, Yuriy Sevidov ? pen, Vyacheslav Ambartsumyan 80 – Yuriy Varlamov 6]

===== Quarterfinals replays =====
[Jul 27] 
Moldova Kishinev              0-1  KAYRAT Alma-Ata 
  [Vadim Stepanov 17]

==== Semifinals ====
[Aug 6] 
SHAKHTYOR Donetsk             2-1  Kayrat Alma-Ata             [aet]  [in Yaroslavl] 
  [Yuriy Ananchenko 16, Anatoliy Rodin 96 – Yevgeniy Kuznetsov 55] 
SPARTAK Moskva                2-0  Dinamo Moskva 
  [Vyacheslav Ambartsumyan 19, Gennadiy Logofet 57 pen]

==== Final ====
10 August 1963

Spartak Moscow	2 – 1	Shakhter Donetsk
Husainov 10'; Falin 62'	[ Report]	Kolosov 8'

Moscow

== Sources ==
- Boiarenko, Oleksandr; Kononchuk, Vitalii; Shkrobyshev, Volodymyr (2012), Кубок СССР 1963 года [1963 Soviet Cup], History of Soviet Sport (in Russian)
