= Anatolii Sadovskyi =

Soviet football coach (born 1916)

Personal information
- Full name: Anatolii Volodymyrovych Sadovskyi
- Date of birth: 4 June 1916 [O.S. 17 June 1916]
- Place of birth: Yekaterinoslav, Yekaterinoslav Governorate, Russian Empire
- Date of death: 5 April 1981 (aged 64)
- Height: 1.67 m (5 ft 6 in)
- Position: Midfielder

Senior career*
Years	Team	Apps	(Gls)
1934	Stal Dnipropetrovsk		
1935–1937	Spartak Dnipropetrovsk		
1937–1938	Stal Dnipropetrovsk		
1938	Spartak Dnipropetrovsk		
1939	Stal Dnipropetrovsk	20	(1)
1940	Lokomotiv Yuga	24	(0)
1940–1941	Dynamo Kyiv	12	(0)
1944–1948	Dynamo Kyiv	52	(1)
1949	Shakhtyor Stalino	26	(0)
1951	Dynamo 6th district council		

Managerial career
- 1962: Avanhard Kramatorsk
- 1962–1963: Dnipro Kremenchuk
- * Club domestic league appearances and goals

Anatolii Sadovskyi (Ukrainian: Анатолій Володимирович Садовський, Russian: Анатолий Владимирович Садовский; born 17 June 1916 O.S. [4 June 1916 N.S.] – 5 April 1981) was a Soviet professional footballer who played as a midfielder. After retiring he became a coach.

== Playing career ==
Sadovskyi began his playing career in Dnipropetrovsk where he played for Stal, Dynamo and Spartak. He could play in midfielder and in defense. His first season was in 1934 for Stal Dnipropetrovsk. Next three years he spent in Spartak Dnipropetrovsk where in 1937 he became champion of the Soviet republican football competition in the Soviet Ukraine. In 1940 he played for Lokomotiv Yuga. Sadovskyi joined Dynamo Kyiv in the end of 1940. With the break in football due to the war, he played with Dynamo in fifty-two league matches, scoring one goal. He also played in three reserves matches and five cup matches. His last season was in 1948. In 1949 he moved to Shakhtyor Stalino where he played for twenty-six matches. They were his last matches in top level of football. In 1951 he was playing for Dynamo 6th district council team in the amateur level.

== Coaching career ==
=== Avanhard ===
Sadovskyi was a manager of Avanhard Kramatorsk during 1962. His team finished last in their group in 1962 Ukrainian Class B. They advanced to second stage. Where they finished thirtieth out of thirty nine teams. Sadovskyi did not finish the season with Kramatorsk. He was in charge on 30 September against Kolhospnyk Poltava. In a match against Hirnyk Kryvyi Rih on 14 October he was not listed as a manager.

=== Dnipro ===
Dnipro Kremenchuk participated in 1962 Poltava Oblast Championship. Final Stage was played on Dnipro Stadium in Kremenchuk from 11 to 14 October. Dnipro won the title and players received diplomas and medals. Sadovskyi was the manager. By winning the Poltava Oblast title, Dnipro was allowed to play in a 1962 Ukrainian Class B Relegation play-offs with Kolhospnyk to earn a spot in next years championship. Dnipro lost 3:1 on aggregate. Next year a newly created professional team Dnipro was selected to participate in 1963 Ukrainian Class B. Sadovskyi was announced as a manager on 3 March 1963. He was in charge of all thirty-eight games, two play-off games and two other play-off games with winner of Poltava Oblast Champions Strila Poltava. On 18 January 1964 in Avtobudivnyk newspaper Sadovskyi and his coaches were described as holding experiments that negatively impacted most games in 1963 and led to the team finishing in last place.

== Honours ==
=== Players ===
Spartak Dnipropetrovsk

- Football Championship of the Ukrainian SSR: 1937

=== Manager ===
Dnipro Kremenchuk

- Poltava Oblast Championship: 1962

== Sources ==
- Pyrukhin, Yurii (n.d.a), Днепр Кременчуг футбол 1963-1969 [Dnipro Kremenchuk football 1963–1969] (in Ukrainian), Kremenchuk
- Pyrukhin, Yurii (n.d.b), Энциклопедия кременчугского футбола [Encyclopedia of Kremenchuk football] (in Russian), Kremenchuk
- Pyrukhin, Yurii (n.d.c), Полтава 1955-1967 (КФК-Класс Б) [Poltava 1955–1967 (KFK-Klas B)] (in Russian), Kremenchuk
- Strikha, Viktor (2017), Летопись футбола и других командных видов спорта в Украине 1887-1944 [Chronicle of football and other team sports in Ukraine 1887-1944] (in Russian), Cherkassy
