= 1959–62 FC Dnipro Kremenchuk seasons =

Early years of Dnipro Kremenchuk FC

The 1959–62 seasons were Dnipro Kremenchuk's early years in existence. Club was formed in 1959 and in 1960 won Poltava Oblast Cup. Club was twice runner up in Poltava Oblast Championship, winning it in 1963. This allowed the club to participate in relegation play-off game for the 1963 Ukrainian Class B. Season 1963 Dnipro began as a new professional team formed from multiple city clubs.

== 1959 ==
Club was founded in 1959 by the Kremenchuk plant of road machinery named after I.V. Stalin "Kredmash" leadership. It took part in the Poltava Oblast Council Voluntary Sports Society "Avanhard" Championship. Six teams took part in the competition, which ran from 18 to 20 June. All matches were played at the Avanhard Stadium. In the first round, on 18 June the team faced Hradyzk team in a 7:0 win. Next day the team faced Avanhard in a 4:1 loss. Team also took part in the Kremenchuk City Championship. On 15 May the team faced Lokomotyv in a 4:0 loss.

Some sources give the club mane as "Torpedo" in 1959. Kremenchuk football historian Yurii Pyrukhin noted that Torpedo was founded by Kremenchuk Combine Plant and it debuted in Poltava Oblast Championship in 1956. For next two years Torpedo was only involved in City Championship. In 1961 Torpedo participated in Poltava Oblast Championship along with Dnipro.

== 1960 ==
During the preseason the club was known as Avanhard and was renamed to Dnipro before season started. In Kremenchuk City Cup, team was named Dnipro-1. In the final match on 8 May, Dnipro faced Avanhard in a 3:1 win at the Dnipro Stadium. This season Dnipro debuted in Central Council Voluntary Sports Society "Avanhard" Championship. In a qualifying match they faced Avanhard at the Avanhard Stadium on 4 August. Match ended in a draw, with Dnipro winning in extra-time. Final score was 2:1. Final games were played in Sloviansk. Dnipro finished all three matches with a draw. With eventual winners Sloviansk, they had a 0:0 draw. Their next matches against Luhansk and Chernihiv footballers, Dnipro had 1:1 draw in both games. Dnipro finished third.

=== Friendlies ===
Win Draw Loss Fixtures

Results list Dnipro's goal tally first.

Date	Opponent	Venue	Result	Dnipro scorers	Referee	Attendance
February 1960	Avanhard-2 (Note: Dnipro was known as Avanhard for the preseason. In this match team was split into Avanhard-1 and Avanhard-2.)	Home	10–0	Unknown goalscorers ?'	N/A	N/A
24 April 1960	Avanhard (Note: Dnipro team was known as Dnipro-2 for this match.)	N/A	0–4		N/A	N/A
May 1960	Shakhtar Oleksandriia	Home	1–3	Unknown goalscorer ?'	N/A	N/A
10 May 1960	Shakhtar Oleksandriia	Away	0–2		N/A	N/A
May 1960	Kremenchuk combined veterans team	Home	2–2	Unknown goalscorers ?'	N/A	N/A
1 June 1960	Kolhospnyk Poltava	Home	0–4		N/A	N/A
7 August 1960	Khimik Dniprodzerzhynsk	Home	2–2	Unknown goalscorers ?'	N/A	N/A
September 1960	Avanhard	N/A	0–2		N/A	N/A
13 September 1960	Avanhard	Away	2–2	Unknown goalscorers ?'	N/A	N/A
25 October 1960	SKA Odesa	Home	2–1	Unknown goalscorers ?'	N/A	N/A
10 November 1960	Daugava Riga	Home	2–3	Unknown goalscorers ?'	N/A	N/A
November 1960	Avanhard	Away	2–1	Unknown goalscorers ?'	N/A	N/A
20 November 1960	Naftovyk Drohobych	Home	2–2	Unknown goalscorers ?'	N/A	N/A

=== Poltava Oblast Cup ===
Dnipro was one of thirty-three teams to take part in a month long cup competition of the Poltava Oblast. First match was played on 15 May. It was a 8:1 win against Kolhospnyk Zinkiv. A week later Dnipro had to go into extra-time to get a 3:2 win against Mashynobydivnyk Karlivka. On 29 May team faced Avanhard Hlobyne, who they beat 9:0. In the quarterfinal on 5 June Dnipro faced House of Military Officers from Myrhorod. Dnipro conceded two goal, however they scored six to win the game. On 8 June the semifinal against Kharchovyk Pyriatyn took place at the Dnipro Stadium. Dnipro won the match 13:0. Final match was held at the Kolhospnyk Stadium in Poltava on 13 June. Lokomotyv Poltava player Volodymyr Kapustian scored an early goal on fifth minute. Dnipro equalized through Yurii Yachniev half-hour later. In the second half Volodymyr Andrieiev scored twice to win the first trophy for Dnipro. Winning this trophy gave Dnipro an opportunity to face winner of the Luhansk Oblast Cup in Cup for amateur clubs in Ukrainian SSR. Dnipro faced Metalurh Alchevsk in a 3:0 loss during the second round of second zone match.

Win Draw Loss Fixtures

Results list Dnipro's goal tally first.

Date	Opponent	Venue	Result	Dnipro scorers	Referee	Attendance
15 May 1960	Kolhospnyk Zinkiv	Away	8–1	Unknown goalscorers ?'	N/A	N/A
22 May 1960	Avanhard (Note: Pyrukhin lists Mashynobudivnyk) Karlivka	Away	3–2 (a.e.t.) (Note: Score was 1–1 after 90 minutes)	Andrieiev ?', ?', Bubriak ?'	N/A	N/A
29 May 1960	Avanhard Hlobyne	Home	9–0	Unknown goalscorers ?'	N/A	N/A
5 June 1960	House of Military Officers Myrhorod	Away	6–2	Unknown goalscorers ?'	N/A	N/A
8 June 1960	Kharchovyk Pyriatyn	Home	13–0	Unknown goalscorers ?'	N/A	N/A
13 June 1960	Lokomotyv Poltava	Away	3–1	Yachniev 30', Andrieiev 60',85'	Yurii Vintsentyk	6,000

=== Poltava Oblast Championship ===
Dnipro began its journey into Poltava Oblast Championship on 19 June. They took part in zone 2 and after first half of the season the club was in second place with fifteen points. Dnipro finished second with thirty-one point. Dnipro and group leaders Lokomotyv advanced to the Final round that took place in Poltava between 1 and 4 October.

Points were awarded as follows: 3 for a win, 2 for a draw and 1 for a loss.

==== Zone 2 ====
Pos	Team	Pld	W	D	L	GF	GA	GD	Pts	
1	Lokomotyv (Q)	12	10	2	0	73	18	+55	34	Final tournament
2	Dnipro (Q)	12	9	1	2	50	16	+34	31	Final tournament
3	Avanhard Karlivka	12	6	1	5	33	29	+4	23	
4	Spartak Pyriatyn	12	5	1	6	18	34	−16	23	

Rules for classification: 1) points; 2) goal difference; 3) number of goals scored.
(Q) Qualified for the phase indicated

Win Draw Loss Fixtures

Results list Dnipro's goal tally first.

Date	Opponent	Venue	Result	Dnipro scorers	Referee	Attendance
June 1960	Avanhard Karlivka	Home	1–2	Unknown goalscorer ?'	N/A	N/A
June 1960	Avanhard Lokhvytsia	Home	6–1	Unknown goalscorers ?'	N/A	N/A
3 July 1960	Lokomotyv	Away	4–4	Unknown goalscorers ?'	N/A	N/A
August 1960	Lokomotyv	Home	1–6	Unknown goalscorer ?'	N/A	N/A
Unknown 1960	Spartak Pyriatyn	Home	2–1	Unknown goalscorers ?'	N/A	N/A
Unknown 1960	Kolhospnyk Lubny	Home	7–0	Unknown goalscorers ?'	N/A	N/A
Unknown 1960	Kolhospnyk Hradyzk	Home	9–0	Unknown goalscorers ?'	N/A	N/A
Unknown 1960	Avanhard Karlivka	Away	w/o			
Unknown 1960	Spartak Pyriatyn	Away	8–0	Unknown goalscorers ?'	N/A	N/A
Unknown 1960	Kolhospnyk Lubny	Away	3–1	Unknown goalscorers ?'	N/A	N/A
Unknown 1960	Avanhard Lokhvytsia	Away	4–1	Unknown goalscorers ?'	N/A	N/A
Unknown 1960	Kolhospnyk Hradyzk	Away	5–0	Unknown goalscorers ?'	N/A	N/A

==== Final Tournament ====
Pos	Team	Pld	W	D	L	GF	GA	GD	Pts
1	Lokomotyv (C)	3	2	1	0	5	2	+3	8
2	Dnipro	3	2	1	0	4	2	+2	8
3	Kolhospnyk-2	3	0	1	2	4	6	−2	4
4	Avanhard	3	0	1	2	2	5	−3	4

Source: [Pyrukhin]
Rules for classification: 1) points; 2) goal difference; 3) number of goals scored.
(C) Champions

Results list Dnipro's goal tally first.

Date	Opponent	Venue	Result	Dnipro scorers	Referee	Attendance
1 October 1960	Kolhospnyk-2	Kolhospnyk Stadium	3–2	Unknown goalscorers ?'	N/A	N/A
2 October 1960	Lokomotyv	Kolhospnyk Stadium	0–0		N/A	N/A
4 October 1960	Avanhard	Kolhospnyk Stadium	1–0	Unknown goalscorer ?'	N/A	N/A

=== Team ===
Known players:

- Goalkeepers: Anatolii Kuznietsov, Eduard Sych, Yurii Shpyhotskyi.
- Defenders: Oleksandr Ivanov, V. Portiankin, István Shtefutsa, Hennadii Tsyplenkov.
- Midfielders: Huram Sologashvili (captain), Hennadii Poryshkin, Rodionov, Volodymyr Andrieiev, Vasyl Bubriakov (Bubriak).
- Forwards: O. Buzhlakov, Viktor Zaviriukha, Heorhii Pylypenko, Petro Kut, Yurii Yachniev, Ihor Klavkin.
- Club Representative: V. Hnoiovyi. Manager: Hryhorii Miroshnyk, Coach: Yevhen Leontovych.

== 1961 ==
Yurii Yachniev and Oleksandr Ivanov left Dnipro and joined Kolhospnyk. Dnipro began playing in Kremenchuk City Championship in late May. They did not finish high enough to be awarded medals. In Kremenchuk City Cup on 23 May their match with Avanhard ended in a 2:2 draw, requiring a replay match, which Dnipro lost 2:1. Cup of the City Committee of Leninist Communist League of Youth of Ukraine was played on 18 June where Dnipro lost 2:1 to Torpedo.

=== Friendlies ===
Win Draw Loss Fixtures

Results list Dnipro's goal tally first.

Date	Opponent	Venue	Result	Dnipro scorers	Referee	Attendance
2 April 1961	Avanhard	Home	0–4		N/A	N/A
2 May 1961	Torpedo Kremechuk	Home	?–?		N/A	N/A
1 June 1961	Kolhospnyk Poltava (Note: Dnipro team was known as Dnipro-1 for this match.)	Home	2–2	Unknown goalscorers ?'	N/A	N/A
8 October 1961	Kolhospnyk Poltava	Home	4–2	Unknown goalscorers ?'	N/A	N/A

=== Poltava Oblast Championship ===
Dnipro was assigned to Zone 2 in the Championship. Matches began on 2 July. Team won their zone with thirty-nine points. This again gave them a chance to advance to Final round held in Poltava between 15 and 18 October. In the first match Dnipro faced Avanhard. They won 4:0. On 17 October Dnipro played last year winners Lokomotyv. The match ended in a 1:1 draw. Next day Dnipro faced Torpedo and won 3:1. In Avanhard and Lokomotyv match, Avanhard fielded ten players. During first half three Avanhard players left the field, one injured and two walked out. Match was abandoned and Lokomotyv was awarded a win. Poltava Oblast football officials decided to annul Avanhard results, disqualify players who walked out and fire manager Hryhorii Miroshnyk. They also awarded first place to Lokomotyv, second to Dnipro, third to Torpedo.

Points were awarded as follows: 3 for a win, 2 for a draw and 1 for a loss.

==== Zone 2 ====
Pos	Team	Pld	W	D	L	GF	GA	GD	Pts	
1	Dnipro (Q)	14	12	1	1	64	15	+49	39	Final tournament
2	Avanhard (Q)	14	9	1	4	36	18	+18	33	Final tournament
3	Avanhard Karlivka	14	8	1	5	41	31	+10	31	
4	Suputnyk Poltava	14	6	3	5	32	23	+9	29	

Rules for classification: 1) points; 2) goal difference; 3) number of goals scored.
(Q) Qualified for the phase indicated

Win Draw Loss Fixtures

Results list Dnipro's goal tally first.

Date	Opponent	Venue	Result	Dnipro scorers	Referee	Attendance
2 July 1961	Kolhospnyk-2 Poltava	Home	1–1	Unknown goalscorer ?'	N/A	N/A
9 July 1961	Suputnyk Poltava	Away	3–4	Unknown goalscorers ?'	N/A	N/A
16 July 1961	Naftovyk Pyriatyn	Home	10–2	Unknown goalscorers ?'	N/A	N/A
23 July 1961	Spartak Lokhvytsia	Away	15–0	Unknown goalscorers ?'	N/A	N/A
30 July 1961	Torpedo Lubny	Home	2–0	Unknown goalscorers ?'	N/A	N/A
6 August 1961	Avanhard Karlivka	Away	3–2	Unknown goalscorers ?'	N/A	N/A
13 August 1961	Avanhard Kremenchuk	Home	3–2 (Note: Avanhard owners filed a protest over the match result.)	Unknown goalscorers ?'	N/A	N/A
20 August 1961	Kolhospnyk-2 Poltava	Away	4–1	Unknown goalscorers ?'	N/A	N/A
27 August 1961	Suputnyk Poltava	Home	4–2	Unknown goalscorers ?'	N/A	N/A
3 September 1961	Naftovyk Pyriatyn	Away	5–0	Unknown goalscorers ?'	N/A	N/A
10 September 1961	Spartak Lokhvytsia	Home	w/o (Note: Spartak failed to show up for seven matches.)			
17 September 1961	Torpedo Lubny	Away	2–0	Unknown goalscorers ?'	N/A	N/A
24 September 1961	Avanhard Karlivka	Home	9–0	Unknown goalscorers ?'	N/A	N/A
1 October 1961	Avanhard Kremenchuk	Away	3–1	Unknown goalscorers ?'	N/A	N/A

==== Final Tournament ====
Pos	Team	Pld	W	D	L	GF	GA	GD	Pts
1	Lokomotyv (C)	3	2	1	0	5	2	+3	8
2	Dnipro	3	2	1	0	8	2	+6	8
3	Torpedo	3	0	1	2	2	7	−5	4
4	Avanhard (D)	3	0	1	2	0	4	−4	4

Source: [Pyrukhin]
Rules for classification: 1) points; 2) goal difference; 3) number of goals scored.
(C) Champions; (D) Disqualified

Win Draw Loss Fixtures

Results list Dnipro's goal tally first. 15 October match against Avanhard was later annulled.

Date	Opponent	Venue	Result	Dnipro scorers	Referee	Attendance
15 October 1961	Avanhard	Away	4–0	Unknown goalscorers ?'	Ye. Zhyhalov	N/A
17 October 1961	Lokomotyv	Away	1–1	Unknown goalscorer ?'	Yurii Pustylnikov	N/A
18 October 1961	Torpedo	Away	3–1	Unknown goalscorers ?'	Yurii Pustylnikov	N/A

=== Team ===
Known players:

- Goalkeepers: Anatolii Kuznietsov.
- Midfielders: Oleksandr Shakytskyi, Hennadii Poryshkin, Ivan Riabenko, Anatolii Holovachiv, Yurii Bunakov.
- Forwards: Anatolii Denysenko, Yevsevii Vaks, Petro Kut.
- Unknown Position: Arif Shirvan-Zade, Horokhov, Oleksandr Liashenko, Motorov.

== 1962 ==
A winter Oblast championship was held 22 to 25 February dedicated to elections to Supreme Soviet of the Soviet Union. Dnipro was assigned to Group 1, however they declined to participate. Forward Yevsevii Vask took part in spring training with Kolhospnyk. Eleven football clubs from Kremenchuk took part in a Spring City Cup that began on 15 April on Dnipro Stadium. In the final Dnipro beat Avantard 3:1. Dnipro lost 2:1 to Avanhard in the City cup final on 27 May.

=== Friendlies ===
Win Draw Loss Fixtures

Results list Dnipro's goal tally first.

Date	Opponent	Venue	Result	Dnipro scorers	Referee	Attendance
3 July 1962	Azovstal Zhdanov	N/A	1–4	Unknown goalscorers ?'	N/A	N/A
5 July 1962	Dniprodzerzhynsk team	N/A	2–0	Prymostka ?', Kushnirskyi ?'	N/A	N/A
17 July 1962	Avanhard Zhovti Vody	Home	3–3	Arseieko ?', ?', Unknown goalscorer ?'	N/A	N/A
26 July 1962	Desna Chernihiv	N/A	3–4	Babaian?', Unknown goalscorers ?'	N/A	N/A
July 1962	Trubnyk Nikopol	Home	0–0		N/A	N/A
August 1962	Shirak Leninakan (Youth)	N/A	1–1	Unknown goalscorer ?'	N/A	N/A
13 August 1962	Combined team (Note: Combined team of coaches and referees of youth groups of teams of masters (clubs playing in top, first, second leagues).)	Home	6–1	Unknown goalscorers ?'	N/A	N/A
29 August 1962	Torpedo Kyiv	Home	7–2	Unknown goalscorers ?'	N/A	N/A
September 1962	KremHESbud	N/A	1–1	Unknown goalscorer ?'	N/A	N/A
9 September 1962	Avanhard	Home	2–3	Unknown goalscorers ?'	N/A	N/A
12 September 1962	Avanhard	Home	0–2 (Note: Pyrukhin states that score could be a 2–0 win for Dnipro.)	N/A	N/A	N/A
19 September 1962	Spartak Kyiv	Home	6–0	Unknown goalscorers ?'	N/A	N/A
27 (Note: Pyrukhin states match could also be played on 28.) October 1962	Avanhard	Home	2–1	Prymostka ?', Novoselytskyi ?'	N/A	N/A
October 1962	Volyn Lutsk	N/A	1–3	Unknown goalscorer ?'	N/A	N/A

=== Poltava Oblast Championship ===
Changes were made the competition to allow for more teams to participate. Competitions of sport societies were held with best teams from them moving on to final stage. From Avanhard society competition Dnipro, Torpedo Kremenchuk and Suputnyk Poltava advanced. They were joined by Spartak competition winner Spartak Novi Sanzhary and Kolhospnyk society winner Kolhospnyk Lubny and Kolhospnyk Kobeliaky. Defending champion Lokomotyv and army team Strila were also allowed to participate. Top two teams would move on to compete for the title. Dnipro finished first in their group winning all three matches played from 7 to 10 October. Final Stage was played on Dnipro stadium in Kremenchuk from 11 to 14 October. Mykola Prymostka was the Final Stage highest Scorer with six goals. Dnipro won the title and players received diplomas and medals.

Points were awarded as follows: 2 for a win, 1 for a draw and 0 for a loss.

==== Avanhard Sport Society competition ====
Win Draw Loss Fixtures

Results list Dnipro's goal tally first.

Date	Opponent	Venue	Result	Dnipro scorers	Referee	Attendance
8 July 1962	Elektromotor Poltava	Away	5–2	Kushnirskyi ?', ?', Kut ?', Prymostka ?', Novoselytskyi ?'	N/A	N/A
12 July 1962	Avanhard Kremenchuk	Home	1–0	Mykola Prymostka ?'	N/A	N/A
15 July 1962	Torpedo Kremenchuk	Home	3–1	Babaian ?', ?', Leontovych ?' (o.g.)	N/A	N/A
22 July 1962	Avanhard Lokhvytsia	Away	?–?		N/A	N/A
29 July 1962	Torpedo Lubny	Home	?–?		N/A	N/A
5 August 1962	Suputnyk Poltava	Away	1–0	Tymoshko ?'	N/A	N/A
12 August 1962	Avanhard Kremenchuk	Away	2–1	Unknown goalscorers ?'	N/A	N/A
? August 1962	Avanhard Karlivka	Home	2–2	Unknown goalscorers ?'	N/A	N/A
2 September 1962	Torpedo Kremenchuk	Away	0–0		N/A	N/A
23 September 1962	Suputnyk Poltava	Home	5–4	Unknown goalscorers ?'	N/A	N/A
Unknown 1962	Avanhard Karlivka	Away	4–0	Unknown goalscorers ?'	N/A	N/A
Unknown 1962	Elektromotor Poltava	Home	?–?		N/A	N/A
Unknown 1962	Avanhard Lokhvytsia	Away	?–?		N/A	N/A
Unknown 1962	Torpedo Lubny	Away	?–?		N/A	N/A

==== First Stage ====
Pos	Team	Pld	W	D	L	GF	GA	GD	Pts	
1	Dnipro (Q)	3	3	0	0	12	0	+12	6	Final tournament
2	Strila (Q)	3	2	0	1	7	6	+1	4	Final tournament
3	Kolhospnyk	3	0	1	2	3	8	−5	1	
4	Spartak Novi Sanzhary	3	0	1	2	5	13	−8	1	

Rules for classification: 1) points; 2) goal difference; 3) penalties.
(Q) Qualified for the phase indicated

Results list Dnipro's goal tally first.

Date	Opponent	Venue	Result	Dnipro scorers	Referee	Attendance
7 October 1962 – 16:00	Spartak Novi Sanzhary	Home	5–0	Sierov ?', Unknown goalscorer ?', Kut?', Prymostka ?' (pen.), Babaian?'	N/A	N/A
8 October 1962 – 16:00	Kolhospnyk Lubny	Home	3–0	Unknown goalscorers ?'	N/A	N/A
10 October 1962 – 16:00	Stila Poltava	Home	4–0	Unknown goalscorers ?'	N/A	N/A

==== Second Stage ====
Pos	Team	Pld	W	D	L	GF	GA	GD	Pts
1	Dnipro (C)	3	2	1	0	9	1	+8	5
2	Suputnyk Poltava	3	1	1	1	5	5	0	3
3	Torpedo	3	0	3	0	4	4	0	3
4	Strila	3	0	1	2	2	10	−8	1

Source: [Pyrukhin]
Rules for classification: 1) points; 2) goal difference; 3) penalties.
(C) Champions

Results list Dnipro's goal tally first.

Date	Opponent	Venue	Result	Dnipro scorers	Referee	Attendance
11 October 1962 – 16:00	Suputnyk Poltava	Home	4–0	Novoselytskyi ?', Prymostka ?', Sierov ?', Kut?'	V. Semenets	N/A
13 October 1962 – 16:00	Stila Poltava	Home	4–0	Sierov ?', Novoselytskyi ?', Prymostka ?', Voloshyn ?' (o.g.)	V. Semenets	N/A
14 October 1962 – 16:00	Torpedo Kremenchuk	Home	1–1	Sierov ?'	V. Semenets	N/A

=== Team ===
Known players:

- Goalkeepers: Anatolii Kuznietsov, Yurii Shpyhotskyi.
- Defenders: Valerii Kushnirskyi, István Shtefutsa,
- Midfielders: Hennadii Poryshkin (captain), Huram Sologashvili,
- Forwards: Mykola Prymostka, Petro Kut,
- Unknown Position: Arif Shirvan-Zade, Mykola Arseieko, Sierov, Leonid Novoselytskyi, Babaian, Myshko, Tymoshko.

Manager: Anatolii Sadovskyi

=== Play-off ===
By winning the Poltava Oblast title, Dnipro was allowed to play in a 1962 Ukrainian Class B Relegation play-offs with Kolhospnyk to earn a spot in next years championship. On 2 November Dnipro traveled to Poltava to play at the Lokomotyv Stadium. Kolhospnyk scored twice to win the game, while Mykola Prymostka scored the penalty for Dnipro on eighty-fifth minute. On 5 November second game was played on Dnipro Stadium in Kremenchuk. Kolhospnyk won 1:0 and remained in the league.

Win Draw Loss Fixtures

Results list Dnipro's goal tally first.

Date	Opponent	Venue	Result	Dnipro scorers	Referee	Attendance
2 November 1962	Kolhospnyk	Away	1–2	Prymostka 85' (pen.)	Volodymyr Popynevskyi	N/A
5 November 1962	Kolhospnyk	Home	0–1		Yurii Pustylnikov	N/A

== Sources ==
- Pyrukhin, Yurii, Энциклопедия кременчугского футбола [Encyclopedia of Kremenchuk football] (in Russian), Kremenchuk
- Lomov, Anatolii (2019), Полтавщина спортивна в обличчях і фактах. [Sport in Poltava region in faces and facts.] (in Ukrainian), Poltava: PP Dyvosvit, ISBN 978-617-633-252-7
- Lomov, Anatolii; Stadnychenko, Oleksandr (2009), 100 Років Полтавському Футболу [100 Years of Poltava Football] (in Ukrainian), Poltava: Poltava, ISBN 978-966-97035-0-7
- Lomov, Anatolii; Kryvorotko, Serhii (2010), Энциклопедия Полтавского Футбола (1909-2010) [Encyclopedia of Poltava Football (1909-2010)] (in Russian), Poltava: OOO "ASMI", ISBN 978-966-182-118-6
- Klykovskyi, Serhii (2010), Лубенському футболу 90 років [90 Years of Football in Lubny] (in Ukrainian), Lubny
