= Kucherenko =

Kucherenko (Ukrainian: Кучеренко), a surname of Ukrainian origin. It is derived from the Ukrainian word kucher (Ukrainian: кучер, lit. 'coachman'), and the suffix -enko, denoting descent.

The surname may refer to:

- Ivan Kucherenko (footballer) (born 1987), Ukrainian football player
- Ivan Kuchuhura-Kucherenko (1878–1937), Ukrainian minstrel (kobzar)
- Maksym Kucherenko (born 2002), Ukrainian football player
- Oleg Kutscherenko (born 1968), Ukrainian-born German wrestler
- Oleksandr Kucherenko (born 1991), Ukrainian and Moldovan football player
- Oleksiy Kucherenko (born 1961), Ukrainian politician
- Olga Kucherenko (born 1985), Russian long jumper
- Serhiy Kucherenko, multiple persons
- Yevhen Kucherenko (born 1999), Ukrainian football player
- Yevheniia Kucherenko (1922–2020), Ukrainian pedagogue
