= FC Kremenchuk =

Football club based in Kremenchuk, Ukraine

Kremenchuk
- Founded: 2018
- Ground: Kredmash Stadium, Kremenchuk
- Capacity: 6,000
- Chairman: Pavlo Zolotarenko
- Manager: Pavlo Zolotarenko

Football Club Kremenchuk (Ukrainian: ФК Кременчук; is a Ukrainian football team based in Kremenchuk, Ukraine.

== History ==
Club was formed in 2018 by Pavlo Zolotarenko who became club president and manager. During summer first sessions for youth school of FC Kremenchuk took place. Club was created as a sports and education organization. Players sixteen year old and older were part of the football club, while children aged two to ten were part of the school. Zolotarenko stated that SC Poltava was his guide and inspiration for creating a football club.

In 2020 Kremenchuk was admitted to play in the First league of Poltava Oblast Championship. Team was made up of players aged sixteen to twenty-two. Average age of players was nineteen years old. Kremenchuk City Football Federation gave city owned Kredmash Stadium to be used in clubs home matches. Pavlo Zolotarenko, Ruslan Prykhodko, Oleh Lashko, Artem Alipatov and Oleksandr Yevtushenko from Kremin-Yunior joined the new team. Kremenchuk made its debut on 21 June. Team finished fifth in the Championship, won the City championship. Team also took part in Mayors cup where they lost in the final.

Next year Zolotarenko took an administrator position in a newly created Kremin-2 while remaining with his duties with Kremenchuk. With Kremin-2 taking part in Poltava Oblast Championship in 2021, Kremenchuk only planned to participate in City Championship and Poltava Oblast Cup. Club received 25,000 Ukrainian hryvnia from the city budget. In Mayors cup Kremenchuk met with another team that Zolotarenko was administering. Kremin-2 won on penalties.

== League and cup history ==
Season	Div.	Pos.	Pl.	W	D	L	GS	GA	P	Domestic Cup	Notes
2020	5th	5	14	6	0	8	23	34	18		Group B
