= FC Kolos Lubny =

Defunct football club based in Lubny, Ukraine

Kolos Lubny
- Founded: 1948
- Dissolved: 1989
- Ground: Tsentralnyi Stadion
- Capacity: 8,049
| Home colours | Away colours |

Football Club Kolos Lubny (Ukrainian: ФК Колос Лубни); was a Ukrainian Soviet football team based in Lubny, Ukraine.

== History ==
Club was formed by Ivan Nelin and A. Rieznikov in 1948 at Lubny Machine-Building Plant of Agricultural Equipment "Komsomolets". Club took part in city competition during early ears. By mid 1950s many leading footballers from city rival Torpedo joined the club. In 1957 the team won both city championship and cup and was allowed to take part in Poltava oblast championship. In 1958 club was renamed Kolhospnyk after in joined the Kolos sports society. It finished eights in its debut season, and won the city double again. Next season they finished second in their zone and moved on to the final part of competition. Klykovskyi in his book writes that club finished third, while Lomov writes they finished forth. In 1960 they finished fifth and won city championship. Next season club only played in city competitions. During 1962, they won the Kolos sports society completion to advance to final part in oblast championship. Club finished third in their group and did not advance. During 1963 club took part in city competitions. Next year they left Kolos sports society and joined Avanhard sports society changing their name to Metalist. They won city cup. In the league they finished fifth and under leadership of coach Kostiantyn Pereverziev lost in the cup final. During 1965 they again finished fifth. Next year club ended the season in sixth place while also winning city double. Former player Anatolii Tiuro was appointed manager in 1967 and won city championship. That year Metalist manage to finish above city rivals Torpedo for the first time in three years in oblast competition. Manager Kostiantyn Pereverziev became a youth team coach. In 1968 club again finished behind Torpedo in sixth place. In 1969 city sport leadership transferred the club from Avanhard to Kolos sports society. This move forced another name change to Kolos. They won the Poltava oblast Kolos competition and took part in the republican competition. In oblast championship club finished sixth and won city double. Next year Kolos finished seventh and won city cup. In 1971 club won city cup and finished sixth in oblast championship. During the next years they finished seventh, eights, eleventh, seventh. They also won city cup in 1972 and city championship in 1975. In 1976 club won city cup and finished seventh in oblast championship. Next year they finished eights. Manager Anatolii Tiuro became an instructor with the club and Valerii Yakuba became manager after completing his military service. In 1978 the main tam finished tenth and youth team eleventh. This forced the factory leadership to make a decision to not take part in oblast championship. Over next years club took part in oblast cup, city competitions where they won city championship in 1982, 1984 and 1986. In 1982 club played in second league of Poltava oblast championship. They won city cup in 1986 and finished seventh in second league zone two. During 1988 they finished seventh in their zone of second league. 1989 was the last year club took part in city competitions.

Club played it's matches at Torpedo Stadium and after reconstruction at Tsentralnyi Stadion.

== Name change ==
- Komsomolets Lubny (1948–1957)
- Kolhospnyk Lubny (1958–1963)
- Metalist Lubny (1964–1968)
- Kolos Lubny (1969–1989)

== Honours ==
Poltava Oblast Championship

Third place (1): 1959

Poltava Oblast Cup

Runners-up (1): 1964

Lubny Championship

Winners (10): 1957, 1958, 1960, 1966, 1967, 1969, 1975, 1982, 1984, 1986
Runners-up (8): 1948, 1951, 1953, 1954, 1955, 1956, 1964, 1970
Third place (2): 1949, 1971

Lubny Cup

Winners (10): 1957, 1958, 1964, 1966, 1969, 1970, 1971, 1972, 1976, 1986

== Managers ==
- Ivan Nelin (1948–1964)
- Kostiantyn Pereverziev (1964–1966)
- Anatolii Tiuro (1967–1978)
- Valerii Yakuba (1978–1986)

== Sources ==
- Lomov, Anatolii; Stadnychenko, Oleksandr (2009), 100 Років Полтавському Футболу [100 Years of Poltava Football] (in Ukrainian), Poltava: Poltava, ISBN 978-966-97035-0-7
- Lomov, Anatolii; Kryvorotko, Serhii (2010), Энциклопеди Полтавского Футбола (1909-2010) [Encyclopedia of Poltava Football (1909-2010)] (in Russian), Poltava: OOO "ASMI", ISBN 978-966-182-118-6
- Klykovskyi, Serhii (2010), Лубенському футболу 90 років [90 Years of Football in Lubny] (in Ukrainian), Lubny
- Pyrukhin, Yurii, Энциклопедия кременчугского футбола [Encyclopedia of Kremenchuk football] (in Russian), Kremenchuk
