= Zolotarenko =

Zolotarenko (Ukrainian: Золотаренко) is a Ukrainian surname. Notable people with this surname include:

- Aleksei Zolotarenko (born 1993), Russian footballer
- Georgy Zolotarenko (1922-2002), Russian entomologist
- Hanna Zolotarenko (?-died after 1671), Hetmana of the Cossack Hetmanate
- Ivan Zolotarenko (?-1655), Zaporozhian Cossack Hetman and polkovnyk
- Pavlo Zolotarenko (born 1997), Ukrainian footballer
- Vasyl Zolotarenko (?-1663), Ukrainian Cossack colonel
