= Maksym Kucherenko =

Ukrainian footballer (born 2002)

Personal information
- Full name: Maksym Mykolayovych Kucherenko
- Date of birth: 17 January 2002 (age 24)
- Place of birth: Kremenchuk, Ukraine
- Height: 1.94 m (6 ft 4 in)
- Positions: Defender; centre-forward

Team information
- Current team: Ślęza Wrocław
- Number: 19

Youth career
- 2014–2019: Kremin Kremenchuk
- 2014–2015: → Kremin-2 Kremenchuk

Senior career*
Years	Team	Apps	(Gls)
2019–2020	Kremin-Yunior Kremenchuk	10	(4)
2020	Kremenchuk	1	(0)
2020–2021	Kremin Kremenchuk	3	(0)
2020	Kolos Polonne	1	(0)
2022	Kremin-2 Kremenchuk	9	(2)
2023–2024	Vilkhivtsi	24	(5)
2024–2025	Słowianin Wolibórz	11	(0)
2025	Czarni Połaniec	12	(0)
2025–	Ślęza Wrocław	9	(0)
- * Club domestic league appearances and goals as of 22:18, 3 June 2026 (UTC)

Maksym Mykolayovych Kucherenko (Ukrainian: Максим Миколайович Кучеренко; born 17 January 2002) is a Ukrainian professional footballer who plays as a defender for Polish III liga club Ślęza Wrocław.

Kucherenko was a forward for Kremin Kremenchuk. He later transferred to Vilkhivtsi where he began playing as a central defender.

== Honours ==
Ślęza Wrocław

- Polish Cup (Wrocław regionals): 2025–26

Individual

- Ukrainian Amateur Football Championship Squad of the Season: 2023–24
