= Tsentralnyi Stadion (Lubny) =

Stadium in Lubny, Ukraine

- Центральний стадіон
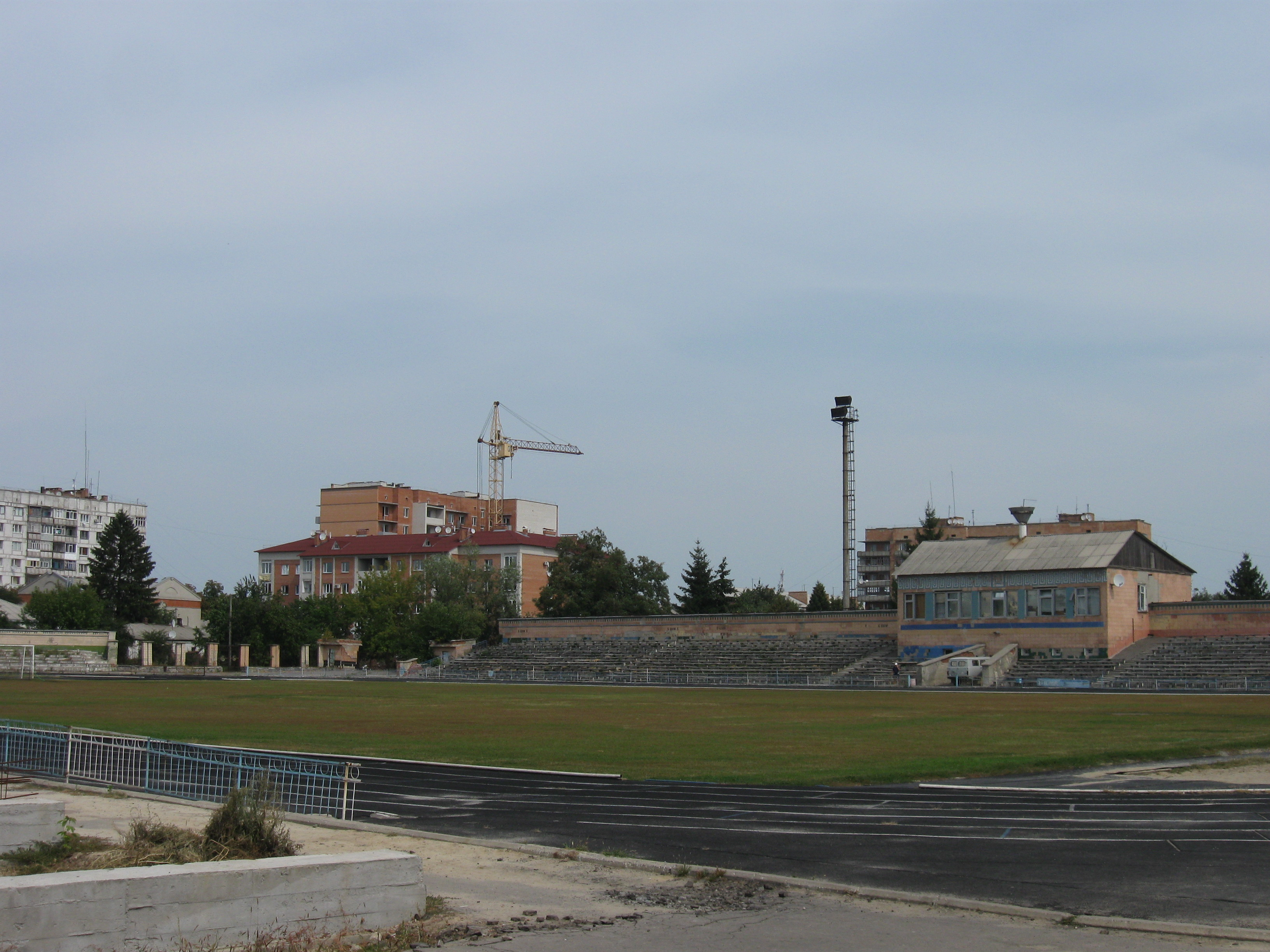
- Interactive map of Tsentralnyi Stadion
- Full name: KP Volodymyr Malykh Tsentralnyi Stadion
- Former names: Dynamo Stadium (1931–1944); Unnamed sport field (1945–1975); Metalist Stadium (1975–1983); Kolos Stadium (1984–1988); Tsentralnyi Stadion (1989–2008); LKS Tsentralnyi (2008–2024); KP Volodymyr Malykh Tsentralnyi Stadion (2024–present)
- Location: Yaroslav Mydryi Street, 26 Lubny, Ukraine
- Coordinates: 50°0′30.4″N 33°0′08.9″E
- Owner: Lubny city
- Operator: Lubny city
- Capacity: 8,049 (before reconstruction)
- Surface: Grass
- Record attendance: 15,000
- Field size: 104 m × 69 m (341 ft × 226 ft)

Construction
- Groundbreaking: 1931
- Built: 1984
- Opened: 18 September 1984; 42 years ago
- Renovated: 1970s, 1988, 1998,
- Expanded: 1984
- Demolished: 1942

Tenants
- Kolos Lubny (1984–1989); Impuls Lubny (1984–1999); Sula Lubny (1985–2001); Lubny (2003–present)

Tsentralnyi Stadion (Ukrainian: Центральний стадіон) is a football stadium in Lubny, Ukraine.

== History ==
The area of the stadium was used as a sports field during 1920s. It was mainly used by local police for physical education events and celebrations. construction of the stadium began under leadership of local security service head Dmytro Medvediev. He was also head of Dynamo club, a three time consecutive Lubny champion by 1931. Stadium was named Dynamo. It was constructed mainly by Dynamo players and their families. In addition to football field, there were: volleyball field, gymnastic equipment, field for general physical preparedness, croquet and nine-pin bowling areas, tennis court, outdoor shooting range and weightlifters corner. Benches for 500 spectators were installed orchestra area and roller coaster were added. A gym was organized in a seized church building across the street. Medvediev personally laid out all fields and areas. Stadium and its many fields were used by all sport societies in Lubny: Dynamo, Spartak, Lokomotyv and Urozhai (Harvest).

After World War II the stadium was rarely used as before. For some time it was used as training area and stadium for secondary competitions. Slowly it degraded to grassy field with one football pitch and small area for kettlebell lifting.

In the end of 1970s Komunar factory team Torpedo and Lubny factory of calculating machines (Lichmash) team Impuls began work on revitalization of the stadium area. In preparation for 1980 Olympic games, all city factories began work on rebuilding the stadium. Stadium received temporary name Metalist. K. Pshenychnyi, the head of local sport society Kolos was tasked with coordinating construction efforts. Lichmash factory workers made a significant impact on construction. Construction was finished before 18 September 1983 to coincide with fortieth anniversary of liberation of Lubny. Work was done to create good draining system and have a modern grass turf. Stadium had the capacity for 8,049 seats, however it could fit u to 15,000. Restoration was completed in 1984 and stadium was transferred to Kolos society. Stadium name was also changed to Kolos. Former player, coach and organizer Maks Shafir was chosen to be stadium director.

Another reconstruction was started four years later in honor of one thousand year anniversary of city founding. A new electronic score board was installed, the first in Poltava Oblast. Athletic track and tennis courts were laid with Regupol. New aerobics studio, chess club, shooting range, billiards room, meeting room and hotel for visitor team. In 1989 Stadium was renamed Tsentralnyi Stadion. Another reconstruction began in 1997 with benches being replaced. In 2004 hotel and number of other building were renovated. Next year after the turf was replaced, many clubs used the stadium as their summer preseason training area. In 2008 stadium was transferred to city ownership and new name became LKS Tsentralnyi (Lubny Communal Stadium Tsentralnyi). New renovation phase began. Main stand was destroyed to make room for improve stand with individual seats. New roof and renovation of other stands were planned.

During 2019 local Forestry school students were involved in fabrication of new wooden benches to replace rotten ones. At the end of 2021 Poltava Oblast department of architecture paid ₴1,000,000 for reconstruction. According to proposed project seating for 3,500 spectators, VIP stand for thirty-two people and twenty person conference area was planned. In December 2023 Lubny mayor announced intentions to rename the stadium in honor of fallen soldier who was a former Sula and Lubny player. Stadium was renamed on 23 February 2024 to Communal Enterprise "Volodymyr Malykh Tsentralnyi Stadion".

== Name change ==
- Dynamo Stadium (1931–1944)
- Unnamed sport field (1945–1975)
- Metalist Stadium (1975–1983)
- Kolos Stadium (1984–1988)
- Tsentralnyi Stadion (1989–2008)
- LKS Tsentralnyi (2008–23 February 2024)
- KP Volodymyr Malykh Tsentralnyi Stadion (23 February 2024–present)

== Gallery ==
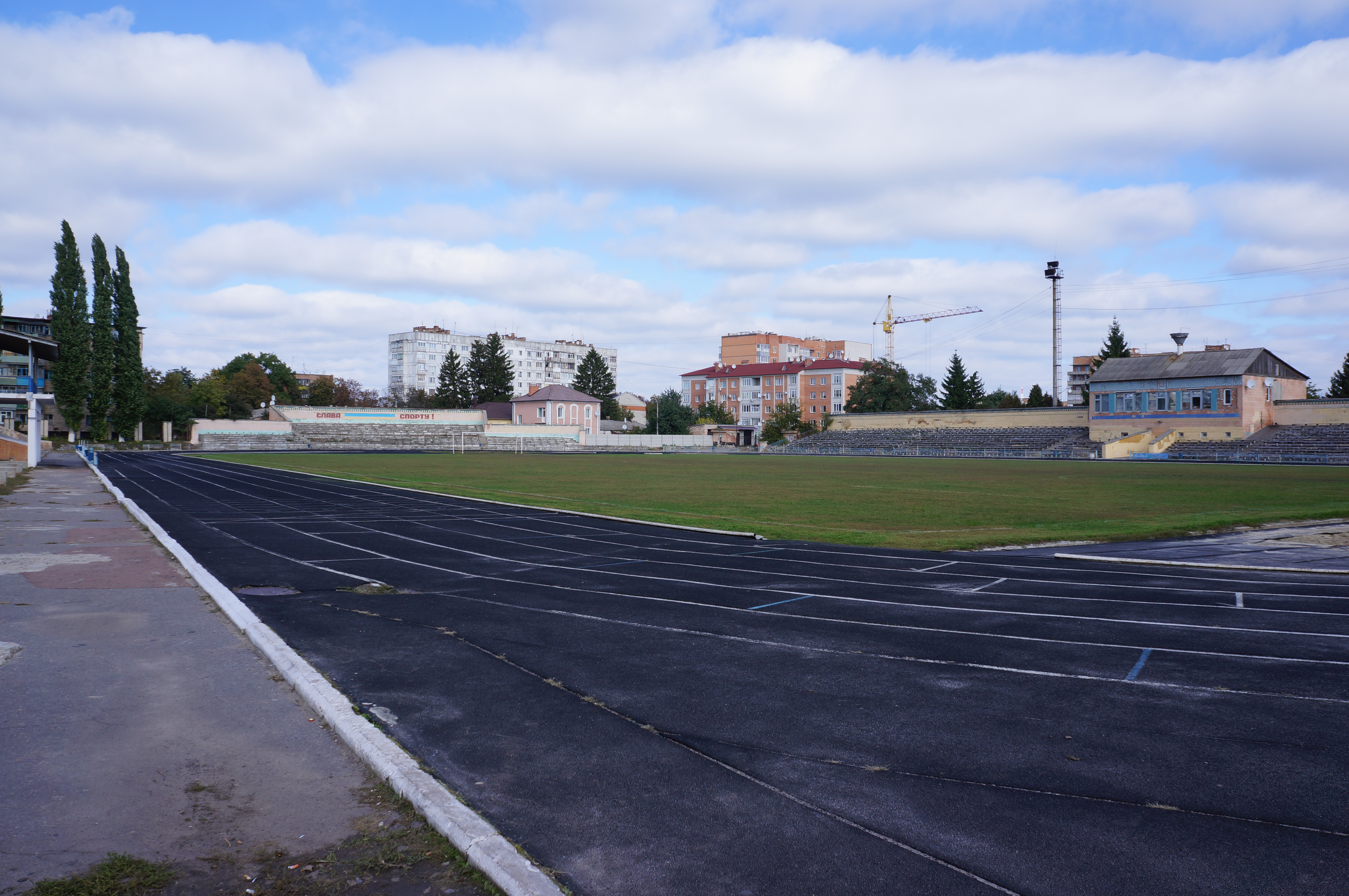
Panorama of Stadium

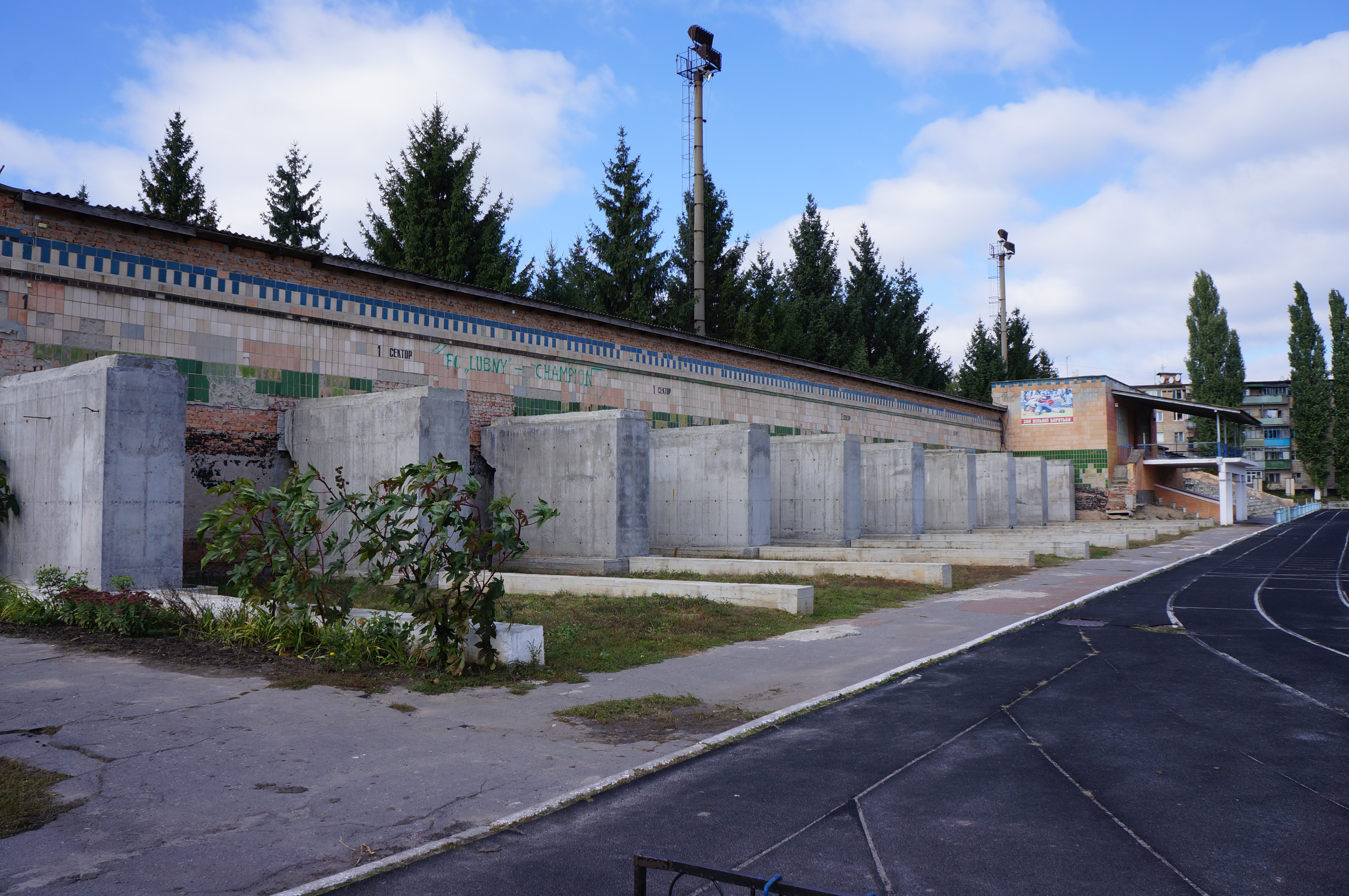
Demolished stands

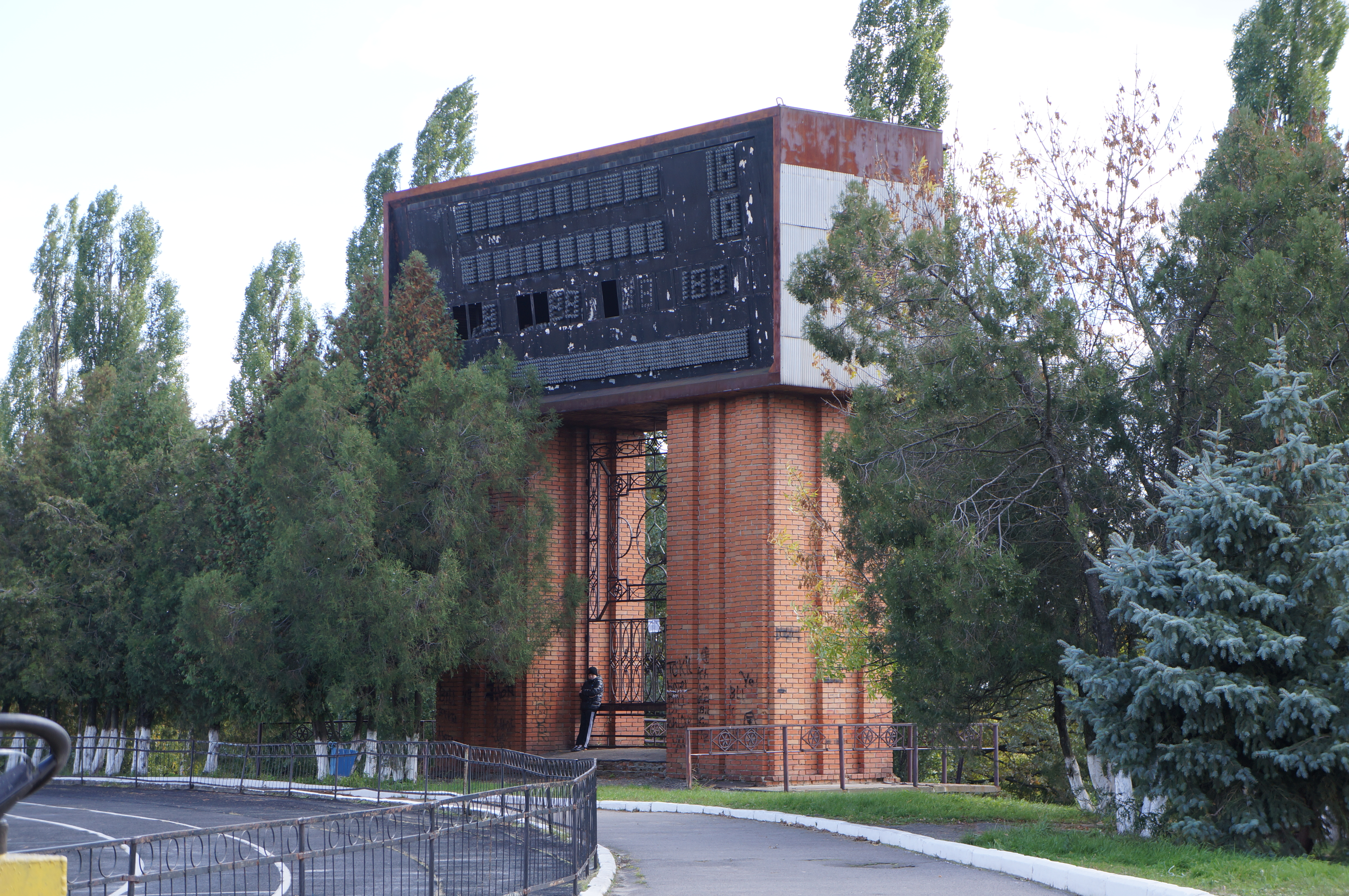
Scoreboard

== Sources ==
- Klykovskyi, Serhii (2010), Лубенському футболу 90 років [90 Years of Football in Lubny] (in Ukrainian), Lubny
- Lomov, Anatolii; Kryvorotko, Serhii (2010), Энциклопедия Полтавского Футбола (1909-2010) [Encyclopedia of Poltava Football (1909-2010)] (in Russian), Poltava: OOO "ASMI", ISBN 978-966-182-118-6
