= FC Impuls Lubny =

Defunct football club based in Lubny, Ukraine

Impuls Lubny
- Founded: 1968
- Dissolved: 1999
- Ground: Tsentralnyi Stadion
- Capacity: 15,000
Home colours	Away colours

Football Club Impuls Lubny (Ukrainian: ФК Імпульс Лубни); was a Ukrainian Soviet football team based in Lubny, Ukraine.

== History ==
Lubny factory of calculating machines was created in 1961. Seven years later, physical education instructor Borys Hryn was one of the key figures in the club's formation. Football Club Impuls Lubny was named Avanhard, and participated in city-level competitions for two years. Football Club Impuls Lubny made its debut in Second League Zone 1 of Poltava Oblast Championship in 1970. They finished third. Next year, they finished fourth. In 1973, the club was renamed Impuls. Former player Anatolii Khvostyk became the new manager. They finished fifth in the Second League. Football Club Impuls Lubny won the city cup in 1975 and finished second in Second League. In 1977, Pavlo Akulov became a playing manager. In his first year, the club won city championship. That year, Football Club Impuls Lubny took part in First League and finished last. In 1978, they finished 11th and won both city cup and championship. Next year, First League was split into two groups. Having finished sixth, Impuls played in group for 9th–16th place and finished 12th. They also won the city double and reached quarterfinals of the Oblast cup. 1980 was the year Impuls won its bronze medals. They also won both the city championship and cup for the third year in a row. During 1981, Impuls finished third in their zone and eights in the league. Next year, they only managed fifth place in their zone and failed to advance to the final stage. Football Club Impuls Lubny leaders left the club, and factory leaders did not have any good academy replacements. FC Impuls Lubny finished fourth in their zone and failed to advance again. From 1984 to 1989, FC Impuls Lubny unsuccessfully participated in Second League. From 1990 to 1999, they played in city championship and cup. Their only success in those last years were 1995 with city cup and 1997 when they won city double.

The club played its matches at Torpedo Stadium and after reconstruction at Tsentralnyi Stadion.

== Name change ==
- Avanhard Lubny (1968–1972)
- Impuls Lubny (1973–1999)

== Honours ==
Poltava Oblast Championship

Third place (1): 1980,

Lubny Championship

Winners (5): 1977, 1978, 1979, 1980, 1997
Runners-up (4): 1987, 1995, 1996, 1998

Lubny Cup

Winners (6): 1975, 1978, 1979, 1980, 1995, 1997
Runners-up (2): 1996, 1999

== Managers ==
- Borys Hryn (1968–1970)
- Kostiantyn Pereverziev (1970–1972)
- Anatolii Khvostyk (1973–1975)
- Pavlo Akulov (1977–1984)
- Anatolii Harmash
- Hryhorii Lebedenko

== Sources ==
- Lomov, Anatolii; Stadnychenko, Oleksandr (2009), 100 Років Полтавському Футболу [100 Years of Poltava Football] (in Ukrainian), Poltava: Poltava, ISBN 978-966-97035-0-7
- Lomov, Anatolii; Kryvorotko, Serhii (2010), Энциклопеди Полтавского Футбола (1909-2010) [Encyclopedia of Poltava Football (1909-2010)] (in Russian), Poltava: OOO "ASMI", ISBN 978-966-182-118-6
- Klykovskyi, Serhii (2010), Лубенському футболу 90 років [90 Years of Football in Lubny] (in Ukrainian), Lubny
- Pyrukhin, Yurii, Энциклопедия кременчугского футбола [Encyclopedia of Kremenchuk football] (in Russian), Kremenchuk
