= Pavlo Zolotarenko =

Ukrainian footballer (born 1997)

Personal information
- Full name: Pavlo Olehovych Zolotarenko
- Date of birth: 20 November 1997 (age 28)
- Place of birth: Kremenchuk, Ukraine
- Positions: Defender; forward

Youth career
- 2010-2011: Kremin Kremenchuk
- 2011-2012: Molod Poltava
- 2013-2014: Azovstal-2 Mariupol

Senior career*
| Years | Team | Apps | (Gls) |
| 2015 | Maiak-Yunior Kotelva | 1 | (1) |
| 2016 | Kolos Dmytrivka | 1 | (0) |
| 2019–2020 | Kremin-Yunior Kremenchuk | 10 | (0) |
| 2020 | Kremenchuk | 3 | (0) |
| 2022–2022 | InterAvto Kremenchuk (futsal) | 18 | (6) |

Managerial career
- 2020: Kremenchuk
- * Club domestic league appearances and goals as of 30 October 2023

Pavlo Olehovych Zolotarenko (Ukrainian: Павло Олегович Золотаренко; born 20 November 1997) is a Ukrainian footballer who played as a defender and later as a forward for Ukrainian club Kremenchuk he is also owner and manager of the team.

== Early life ==
Pavlo Zolotarenko was born on 20 November 1997, in Kremenchuk, Ukraine. He began his football education with Kremin Kremenchuk Academy. Latar joining Molod Poltava and Azovstal-2 Mariupol. In 2014 he trained with SC Poltava. During 2016 and 2017 Zolotarenko played for Metalist-Yunior Kharkiv. He was also a coach there. He was also a coach in FC “Footbik” Kharkiv in 2018. In March 2018 he returned to Kremenchuk where he opened a football school "Ajaxik". Later during the summer a youth school of the FC Kremenchuk was opened.

== Career ==
=== Kremin-Yunior ===
He played as a defender for Kremin-Yunior Kremenchuk during their 2019–20 Ukrainian Football Amateur League season. He made ten appearances in that season before Kremin withdrew from competition.

=== Kremenchuk ===
Next season FC Kremenchuk owned by Zolotarenko was admitted into 2020 Football Championship of Poltava Oblast. Zolotarenko was the playing manager for the season. Team finished fifth in the Championship and won the Kremenchuk City championship. Team also took part in Mayors cup where they lost in the final.

=== Kremin ===
During 2021 and 2022 he was Nachalnik Komandy for Ukrainian First League club Kremin Kremenchuk.

Zolotarenko was appointed as club administrator for Kremin-2 Kremenchuk in April 2021.
