= Hryhorii Miroshnyk =

Soviet footballer and coach (born 1914)

Personal information
- Full name: Hryhorii Mykhailovych Miroshnyk
- Date of birth: 1914
- Place of birth: Russian Empire
- Date of death: death date unknown
- Positions: Defender; midfielder

Senior career*
Years	Team	Apps	(Gls)
1936–1937	FC Spartak Kyiv	9+	(1+)
1939	Spartak Minsk	10	(0)

Managerial career
- 1960: Dnipro Kremenchuk
- 1961: Avanhard Kremenchuk
- 1964–1965: Dnipro Kremenchuk (assistant)
- * Club domestic league appearances and goals

Hryhorii Miroshnyk (Ukrainian: Григорій Михайлович Мірошник, Russian: Григорий Михайлович Мирошник; born 1914 – death date unknown) was a Ukrainian footballer in the Soviet Union who played as a defender and a midfielder. After retiring he became a coach.

== Playing career ==
Miroshnyk began his playing career in 1936 with Spartak Kyiv. During the 1937 season, he featured in nine matches in the 1937 Soviet football championship. He also played twice in the 1937 Soviet Cup. In 1939 he was playing for Spartak Minsk.

During the war, he played for Military unit of Major Ivanov for which most players of Spartak Minsk played. He took part in 1942 Spring and Fall Moscow championship and in Summer Moscow Cup. During 1942, he began playing for Dinamo II.

== Coaching career ==
After retiring he became a manager at Dnipro in Kremenchuk for the 1960 season. He led the team to second place in Poltava Oblast Championship. He won the Poltava Oblast Cup. Next year he managed another city club Avanhard. In 1961, Poltava Oblast Championship last game of final group Avanhard faced Lokomotyv. Avanhard fielded ten players. During first half three Avanhard players left the field, one injured and two walked out. Match was abandoned and Lokomotyv was awarded a win. Poltava Oblast football officials decided to annul Avanhard results, disqualify players who walked out and fire manager Hryhorii Miroshnyk. He rejoined Dnipro in 1964 as a coach and remained there for two years.

== Sources ==
- Pyrukhin, Yurii (n.d.a), Днепр Кременчуг футбол 1963-1969 [Dnipro Kremenchuk football 1963-1969] (in Ukrainian), Kremenchuk
- Pyrukhin, Yurii (n.d.b), Энциклопедия кременчугского футбола [Encyclopedia of Kremenchuk football] (in Russian), Kremenchuk
- Pyrukhin, Yurii (n.d.c), Полтава 1955-1967 (КФК - Класс Б) [Poltava 1955-1967 (KFK - Class B)] (in Ukrainian), Kremenchuk
- Kolomiiets, Anatolii (2007), Киевский футбол на рубежах времен. Люди, cобытия, факты. I том (1911-1961 гг.) [Kyiv football at the turn of the times. People, events, facts. Volume I (1911-1961)] (in Russian), Kyiv: A-Dept, ISBN 978-966-96529-9-7
- Strikha, Viktor (2017), Летопись футбола и других командных видов спорта в Украине 1887-1944 [Chronicle of football and other team sports in Ukraine 1887-1944] (in Russian), Cherkassy
