= Torpedo Stadium (Lubny) =

Stadium in Lubny, Ukraine

- Стадіон Торпедо
- Interactive map of Torpedo Stadium
- Former names: Komunar (1947–1959)
- Location: Verstatobudnykiv Street, 8a Lubny, Ukraine
- Coordinates: 50°01′22.1″N 32°58′56.1″E
- Owner: Lubny Children's and Youth Sports School
- Operator: Lubny Children's and Youth Sports School
- Capacity: 350
- Surface: Grass
- Record attendance: 5,000
- Field size: 102 m × 64.5 m (335 ft × 212 ft)

Construction
- Groundbreaking: 1946
- Built: 1947
- Opened: 1947; 79 years ago
- Renovated: 1960, 1979

Tenant
- Impuls (1968–1984)

Torpedo Stadium (Ukrainian: Стадіон Торпедо) is a football stadium in Lubny, Ukraine.

== History ==
Construction of the stadium began in 1946 and was completed in 1947. It was constructed and owned by Komunar factory(current Lubny machine tool factory). Factory had a team named after it and the stadium also received same name. During the first stage of construction, work was done by factory workers. Work was done to improve the stadium during the 1950s. At that time stadium was more than a football stadium. Various sporting events, city spartakiad, volleyball matches, athletic events and during winter time an ice rink. Big stand was made out of wood, as was the new scoreboard added in 1960s. When club changed its name to Torpedo, stadium was renamed also. During 1970s new fence was added and new dressing rooms were constructed. Stadium had its limitations due to small capacity even with new temporary metal stands being added. It remained the main city stadium until construction of Tsentralnyi Stadion. Lubny machine tool factory lost ownership of the stadium by 2008. Lubny Children's and Youth Sports School became the new owner. Field size was increased from 96x64 m to 102x64.5 m. Stadium remains a reserve city stadium and hold youth matches. New additions to the stadium include: minifootball fields, volleyball and basketball courts.

== Sources ==
- Klykovskyi, Serhii (2010), Лубенському футболу 90 років [90 Years of Football in Lubny] (in Ukrainian), Lubny
