= 1963 Ukrainian Class B =

Football Championship of Ukrainian SSR
- Season: 1963
- Champions: SKA Odessa
- Promoted: SKA Odessa
- Relegated: none

The 1963 Football Championship of Ukrainian SSR (Class B) was the 33rd season of association football competition of the Ukrainian SSR, which was part of the Ukrainian Class B. It was the thirteenth in the Ukrainian Class B.

The 1963 Football Championship of Ukrainian SSR (Class B) was won by SKA Odessa.

There was reorganization of professional football competitions with Class A being expanded by adding extra tier and all Class B competitions including in Ukraine were moved to the third tier. Due to reorganization 35 out of 39 teams were relegated to lower tier by continuing to compete in the Ukrainian Class B competitions.

== Format ==
The Ukrainian Republican competition consisted of two zones of 20 clubs. Upon conclusion of the league format each club qualified for a playoff with another club that placed the same place in the other group. The pair of the first placed clubs was sort of a republican championship playoff. The playoffs consisted of two legs – home and away. Note teams were relegated or withdrawn and only one was promoted to the Subgroup A (the First League).

== Location map ==
Locations of teams in Class B

== Zone 1 ==
=== Relegated teams ===
- none

=== Promoted teams ===
- FC Dnipro Kremenchuk – (debut, champion of Poltava Oblast in 1962)

=== Relocated and renamed teams ===
- FC Zirka Kirovohrad was last year known as FC Dynamo Kirovohrad
- FC Budivelnyk Kherson was last year known as FC Mayak Kherson
- FC Spartak Ivano-Frankivsk was last year known as FC Spartak Stanislav

=== League's standing ===
Pos	Team	Pld	W	D	L	GF	GA	GD	Pts
1	FC Lokomotyv Vinnytsia	38	25	10	3	58	22	+36	60
2	SKA Lviv	38	26	7	5	82	35	+47	59
3	FC Zirka Kirovohrad	38	23	6	9	72	26	+46	52
4	FC Polissya Zhytomyr	38	21	7	10	58	36	+22	49
5	FC Avanhard Ternopil	38	14	19	5	44	26	+18	47
6	FC Kolhospnyk Cherkasy	38	19	8	11	50	35	+15	46
7	SKA Kyiv	38	16	12	10	54	26	+28	44
8	FC Budivelnyk Kherson	38	14	13	11	48	47	+1	41
9	FC Dynamo Khmelnytskyi	38	14	9	15	41	47	−6	37
10	FC Arsenal Kyiv	38	13	10	15	38	39	−1	36
11	FC Desna Chernihiv	38	12	12	14	35	42	−7	36
12	FC Spartak Ivano-Frankivsk	38	15	5	18	44	48	−4	35
13	FC Verkhovyna Uzhhorod	38	13	9	16	36	42	−6	35
14	FC Sudnobudivnyk Mykolaiv	38	11	12	15	33	43	−10	34
15	FC Avanhard Chernivtsi	38	11	8	19	40	66	−26	30
16	FC Shakhtar Oleksandria	38	7	12	19	28	56	−28	26
17	FC Volyn Lutsk	38	8	10	20	24	61	−37	26
18	FC Kolhospnyk Rivne	38	9	7	22	37	57	−20	25
19	FC Naftovyk Drohobych	38	5	14	19	36	54	−18	24
20	FC Dnipro Kremenchuk	38	5	8	25	32	82	−50	18

== Zone 2 ==
=== Relegated teams ===
- none

=== Promoted teams ===
- FC Burevisnyk Melitopol – (debut)
- FC Metalurh Komunarsk – (debut, champion of Luhansk Oblast in 1962)
- FC Metalurh Yenakiyeve – (debut, champion of Donetsk Oblast in 1962)
- FC Metalurh Kerch – (debut, champion of Crimean Oblast in 1962)

=== Relocated and renamed teams ===
- SC Tavriya Simferopol was last year known as FC Avanhard Simferopol
- FC Spartak Sumy was last year known as FC Avanhard Sumy

=== League's standing ===
Pos	Team	Pld	W	D	L	GF	GA	GD	Pts
1	SKA Odessa	38	23	12	3	59	11	+48	58
2	FC Azovstal Zhdanov	38	19	11	8	54	37	+17	49
3	FC Torpedo Kharkiv	38	19	9	10	50	33	+17	47
4	FC Burevisnyk Melitopol	38	14	16	8	38	28	+10	44
5	FC Shakhtar Horlivka	38	14	15	9	49	44	+5	43
6	FC Khimik Severodonetsk	38	14	15	9	44	40	+4	43
7	FC Lokomotyv Donetsk	38	14	13	11	35	37	−2	41
8	FC Shakhtar Kadiyevka	38	12	16	10	51	37	+14	40
9	FC Kolhospnyk Poltava	38	15	10	13	40	32	+8	40
10	FC Dniprovets Dniprodzerhynsk	38	17	5	16	53	51	+2	39
11	FC Metalurh Kommunarsk	38	15	9	14	41	46	−5	39
12	SC Navy Sevastopol	38	15	8	15	48	32	+16	38
13	FC Trubnik Nikopol	38	12	14	12	42	35	+7	38
14	FC Avanhard Zhovti Vody	38	15	7	16	42	44	−2	37
15	SC Tavriya Simferopol	38	13	11	14	39	41	−2	37
16	FC Avanhard Kramatorsk	38	11	11	16	34	44	−10	33
17	FC Hirnyk Kryvyi Rih	38	8	10	20	37	64	−27	26
18	FC Metalurh Yenakiyeve	38	9	8	21	38	74	−36	26
19	FC Metalurh Kerch	38	6	9	23	28	57	−29	21
20	FC Spartak Sumy	38	6	9	23	28	63	−35	21

== Play-offs ==
Each team played against the same ranking team from the other zone. Only the two top pairs that really mattered concerning promotion are listed next. No teams were relegated. SKA Odessa obtained the promotion from the Ukraine zone. They were classified as the Republican champions and were promoted to the Inter-Republican level, the Class A.

- FC Lokomotyv Vinnytsia – SKA Odessa 0:2 0:1
- FC Azovstal Zhdanov – SKA Lviv 0:0 1:0
- FC Zirka Kirovohrad – FC Torpedo Kharkiv 1:1 0:2
- FC Burevisnyk Melitopol – FC Polissya Zhytomyr 1:0 1:3
- FC Avanhard Ternopil – FC Shakhtar Horlivka 1:1 0:0
- FC Kolhospnyk Cherkasy – FC Khimik Severodonetsk 2:1 0:2
- FC Lokomotyv Donetsk – SKA Kyiv 0:2 1:2
- FC Budivelnyk Kherson – FC Shakhtar Kadiivka 3:2 0:2
- FC Dynamo Khmelnytsky – FC Kolhospnyk Poltava 5:1 0:1
- FC Arsenal Kyiv – FC Dniprovets Dniprodzerzhynsk 3:2 1:2
- FC Desna Chernihiv – FC Metalurh Kommunarsk 3:1 1:2
- SC Navy Sevastopol – FC Spartak Ivano-Frankivsk 2:1 1:4
- FC Verkhovyna Uzhhorod – FC Trubnyk Nikopol 0:0 1:2
- FC Avanhard Zhovti Vody – FC Sudnobudivnyk Mykolaiv 1:1 1:0
- FC Avanhard Chernivtsi – SC Tavriya Simferopol 6:0 0:1
- FC Avanhard Kramatorsk – FC Shakhtar Oleksandriya 1:1 0:2
- FC Volyn Lutsk – FC Hirnyk Kryvyi Rih 0:0 0:3
- FC Kolhospnyk Rivne – FC Metalurh Yenakieve 3:1 2:2
- FC Metalurh Kerch – FC Naftovyk Drohobych 0:1 0:0
- FC Dnipro Kremenchuk – FC Spartak Sumy 0:0 0:2

== Relegation play-offs ==
- FC Volyn Lutsk – Zenit Volodymyr-Volynskyi 0:1 3:3
- FC Metalurh Yenakieve – FC Shakhtar Chystyakove 1:0 2:0
- FC Dnipro Kremenchuk – FC Strila Poltava 4:0 1:0

== See also ==
- Soviet Second League
