= Yurii Yachniev =

Soviet footballer (born 1940)

Personal information
- Full name: Yurii Petrovych Yachniev
- Date of birth: 1940 (age 85–86)
- Place of birth: Moscow
- Position: Midfielder

Senior career*
Years	Team	Apps	(Gls)
1960	Dnipro Kremenchuk		
1961–1964	Kolhospnyk Poltava	80+	(13+)
1965–1966	CSKA Kyiv	39+	(3)
1967	Kolhospnyk Poltava	6+	(1)
1968	Torpedo Podolsk	4+	
- * Club domestic league appearances and goals

Yurii Yachniev (Ukrainian: Юрій Петрович Ячнєв, Russian: Юрий Петрович Ячнев; born 1940) is a retired Soviet professional footballer who played as a midfielder.

== Playing career ==
Yurii Yachniev during 1940 in Moscow. There he began playing football. Yachniev joined Dnipro Kremenchuk in 1960. In the final of Poltava Oblast Cup he scored the first goal to help his side win its first trophy. In January 1961 he moved to Kolhospnyk Poltava. He easily transitioned to professional football and became one of clubs leaders. He left Kolhospnyk after 1964 season ended. While performing his conscription service, he played for CSKA Kyiv. In August 1966 sports and technical commission of the Football Federation of the Soviet Union banned him from playing in any official matches. After his service was completed he rejoined Kolhospnyk. In 1986 he joined Torpedo from Podolsk.

== Sources ==
- Pyrukhin, Yurii (n.d.b), Энциклопедия кременчугского футбола [Encyclopedia of Kremenchuk football] (in Russian), Kremenchuk
- Pyrukhin, Yurii (n.d.c), Полтава 1955-1967 (КФК-Класс Б) [Poltava 1955–1967 (KFK-Klas B)] (in Russian), Kremenchuk
- Lomov, Anatolii (2015), "Ворскла" (Полтава) в лицах, событиях, фактах. 1955-2015 ["Vorskla" (Poltava) in faces, events, facts. 1955-2015] (in Russian), Poltava: Dyvosvit, ISBN 978-617-633-116-2
- Kolomiiets, Anatolii (2010), Киевский футбол на рубежах времен. Люди, cобытия, факты. II том (1961-1991 гг.) [Kyiv football at the turn of the times. People, events, facts. Volume II (1961-1991)] (in Russian), Kyiv: A-Dept, ISBN 978-966-2966-07-7
