= Serhiy Kucherenko =

Serhiy Kucherenko may refer to:

- Serhiy Kucherenko (footballer, born 1961), former Soviet Union
- Serhiy Kucherenko (footballer, born 1984), Ukraine
