= FC Strila Poltava =

Defunct football club based in Poltava, Ukraine

Strila Poltava
- Founded: 1962
- Dissolved: 1964
- Ground: Poltava

Football Club Strila Poltava (Ukrainian: ФК Стріла Полтава); was a Ukrainian Soviet Army football team based in Poltava, Ukraine.

== History ==
Club was created by Soviet Army in Poltava. It took part in first stage of Poltava Oblast Championship where they advanced to the final part. From 7 to 10 October 1962 they played in Kremenchuk where they finished in second place to move on to second stage. They drew one game and lost twice to finish in fourth place. V. Kustovskyi was selected as the best midfielder of the tournament. Next year they were drawn into Hrebinka zone where they finished second. In the final stage held in Poltava from 22 to 27 October Strila won its first and only trophy. As the champions they faced 1963 Ukrainian Class B playoff losing team Dnipro Kremenchuk. The first match on the third began with both team being cautions. Dnipro players were first to take control of the match and score though Anatolii Lytvynov on fourteenth minute. Nine minutes later Viktor Stupak doubled the score. After the hour mark Mykola Prymostka scored another goal. Lytvynov scored his second on seventy-sixth minute. Five days later in the second leg Dnipro only scored once through Viktor Yefimenko. With winning the play-offs they guaranteed a spot in the 1964 Ukrainian Class B Championship.

== Honours ==
Poltava Oblast Championship

Winners (1): 1963

== Sources ==
- Lomov, Anatolii; Stadnychenko, Oleksandr (2009), 100 Років Полтавському Футболу [100 Years of Poltava Football] (in Ukrainian), Poltava: Poltava, ISBN 978-966-97035-0-7
- Lomov, Anatolii; Kryvorotko, Serhii (2010), Энциклопеди Полтавского Футбола (1909-2010) [Encyclopedia of Poltava Football (1909-2010)] (in Russian), Poltava: OOO "ASMI", ISBN 978-966-182-118-6
