= Kredmash Stadium =

Stadium in Kremenchuk, Ukraine

- Стадіон Кредмаш
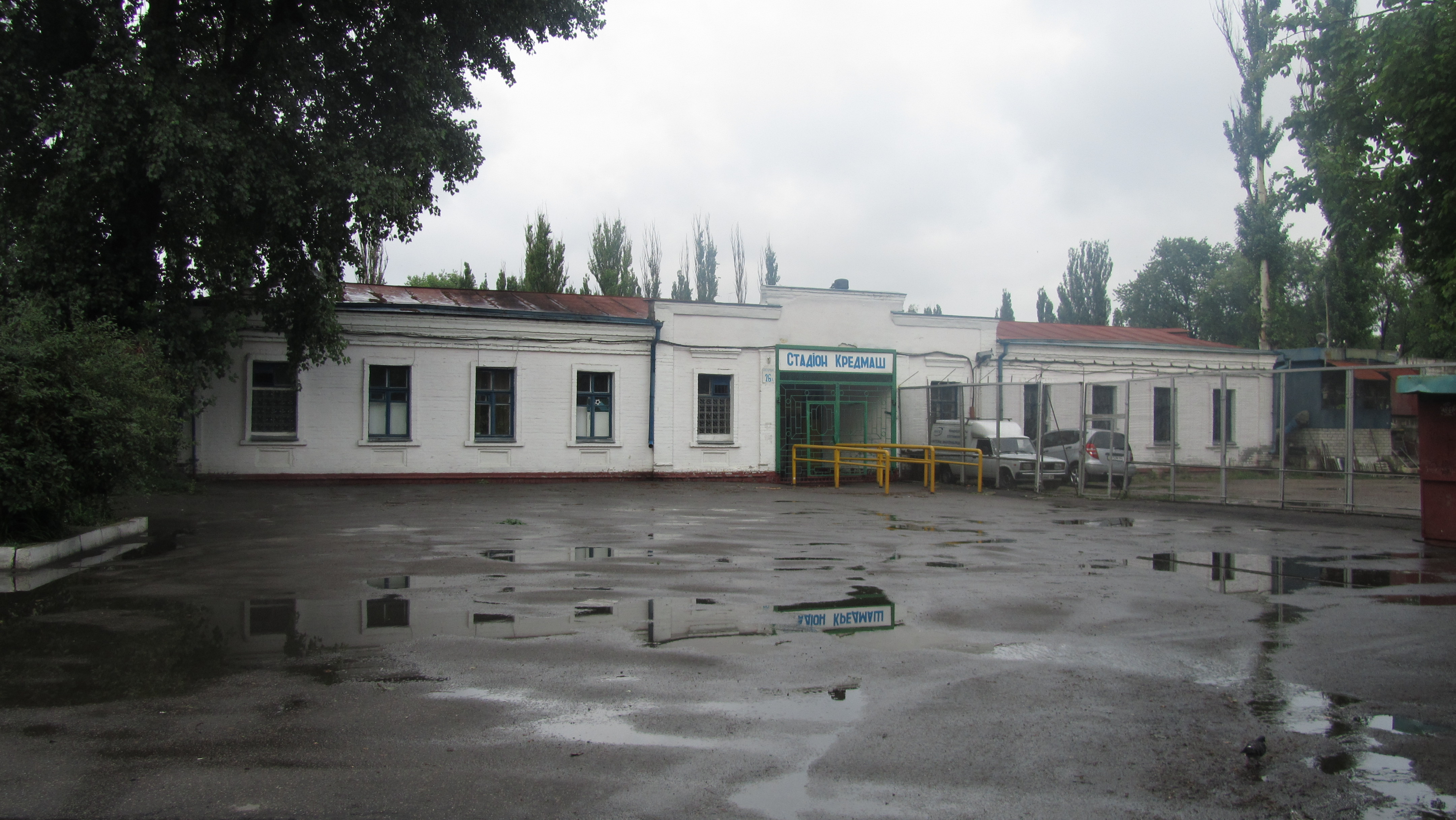
- Interactive map of Kredmash Stadium
- Full name: Kredmash Stadium
- Former names: May 1st Stadium, Dynamo, Spartak, Dnipro
- Location: Haharina Street, 26-A Kremenchuk, Ukraine
- Coordinates: 49°4′3.22″N 33°25′10.89″E
- Owner: Kremenchuk
- Operator: City Sport School Avanhard
- Capacity: 6,000
- Surface: Grass

Construction
- Built: 1928
- Opened: 2 May 1928; 98 years ago

Tenants
- Kremin; FC Kremin-2 Kremenchuk

Kredmash Stadium (Ukrainian: Стадіон Кредмаш) is a football stadium in Kremenchuk, Ukraine.

== History ==
The stadium was built during 1928 and opened on 2 May. It was also named May 1 Stadium. Shortly before World War II stadium was renamed into Dynamo. It was destroyed during the war. After reconstruction it was run by sports association "Spartak" which also gave same name to the stadium. In 1960 Stadium was transferred to the Kremenchuk plant of road machinery (Kredmash). It was renamed into Dnipro in honor of the newly created football club Dnipro who that year won the Poltava Oblast Cup. In 2013 the city of Kremenchuk became owner of the stadium. On 4 April 2017 the city-owned football club Kremin became operator of the stadium. On 5 November 2021 the city changed the operator for the stadium to a city-owned Sport School Avanhard.

== Other uses ==
In May 1963 during reconstruction of Kolhospnyk Stadium home venue for Vorskla Poltava, the team played two matches at the Kredmash Stadium.

== Gallery ==
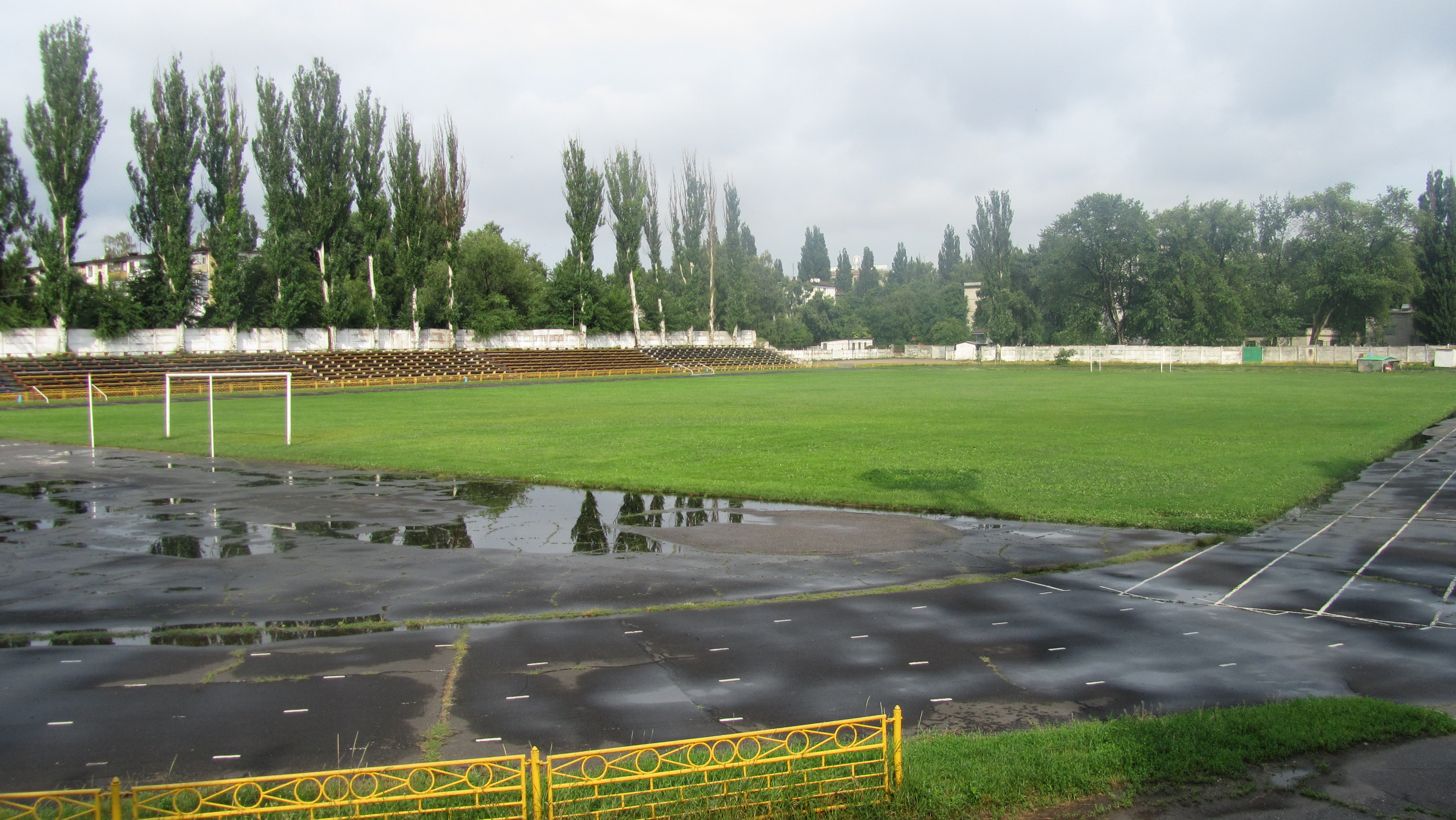
Panorama of Administrative building

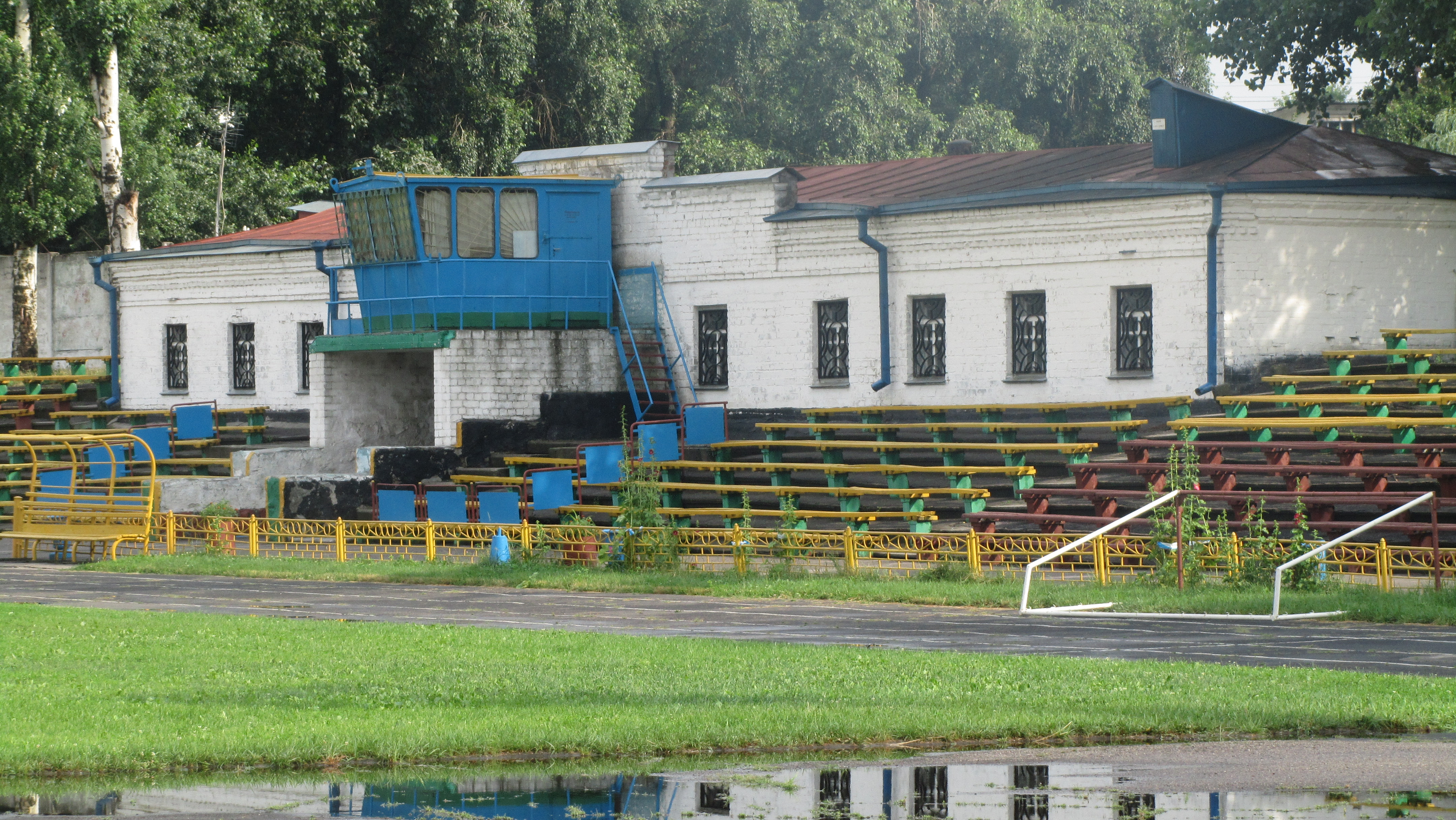
Panorama of stands
