= 2020 Football Championship of Poltava Oblast =

Football Championship of Poltava Oblast
- Season: 2020
- Champions: Olimpiya Savyntsi

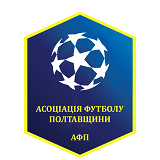

The 2020 Football Championship of Poltava Oblast was won by Olimpiya Savyntsi.

== League table ==
Pos	Team	Pld	W	D	L	GF	GA	GD	Pts
1	Olimpiya Savyntsi (C)	14	12	1	1	44	8	+36	37
2	SC Poltava	14	10	1	3	26	8	+18	31
3	Velyki Krynky	14	7	3	4	26	21	+5	24
4	Kolos Velyki Sorochyntsi	14	6	4	4	17	14	+3	22
5	Standart-Naftogaz Novi Sanzhary	14	6	1	7	18	22	−4	19
6	Invasport Poltava	14	5	2	7	23	21	+2	17
7	Lubny	14	2	2	10	4	35	−31	8
8	Lokomotyv Hrebinka	14	0	2	12	4	33	−29	2

Source: "Чемпионат Полтавской области 2020". footballfacts.ru.
(C) Champions
