= FC Torpedo Lubny =

Defunct football club based in Lubny, Ukraine

Torpedo Lubny
- Founded: 1921
- Ground: Torpedo Stadium
- Capacity: 450
Home colours	Away colours

Football Club Torpedo Lubny (Ukrainian: ФК Торпедо Лубни); was a Ukrainian Soviet football team based in Lubny, Ukraine.

== History ==
=== Early years ===
Club was formed from workers at Lubny mechanical workshops of the iron foundry Feniks. In 1928 Club was renamed Komunar due to factory being renamed in honor of tenth anniversary of October Revolution. Club won its first city championship in 1928. With formation of Spartak and Dynamo in Lubny, club did not win any more trophies before the German invasion in 1941. After the war, when Komunar factory was rebuilt, leadership decided to revive the club. In 1947 it was recreated under new name - Batkivshchyna. In its first year club won city championship and made its debut in oblast championship in group four. In 1948 Leonid Volkov was appointed as manager and won city double. Under the name Batkivshchyna club played until 1952. During that span they won c-city double in 1949, 1950, 1951 and 1952. In oblast cup they reached the final in 1952, where they lost to Lokomotyv Poltava.

=== Saliut ===
There are no clear reasons or dates for the name change to Saliut. Saliut was a sport society for machine tool workers. Name was changed in Moscow. New season started by the time that decision reached the club. In May club name was Batkivshchyna, by mid June new name was used. Lomov in his books uses Saliut during 1951 and 1952 seasons, however he lists Batkivshchyna as team that lost in 5 August 1952 cup final. By the end of 1952 only Saliut was used. Club won the city double in 1953.

=== Torpedo ===
After Saliut sport society was dissolved on 11 June 1953, Club joined Torpedo sport society. During 1954 season, Torpedo won the city cup and took part in Second League of the oblast championship. Before next season, the Club made big improvements to its squad. They won city double. In oblast championship the club finished second in zone two and advanced to final part. They lost all three matches to finish in fourth place. In oblast cup team reached the quarterfinals. In 1956 Torpedo played in zone two and finished third. They also won city double. During 1957 Torpedo took part in second league of oblast championship. They won their group and advanced to final part. They won their group again and played against Kharchovyk Karlivka for the only promotion spot. Torpedo lost the playoff match.

=== Avanhard ===
Sport societies were reorganized in 1958 and the club received their new name - Avanhard. Club played that year in second league. In oblast cup they reached the final where they again lost to Lokomotyv Poltava. In the winter championship of 1959, Avanhard finished sixth. In June they took part in Avanhard sport society qualifier where they lost in final match failing to advance to Ukrainian final.

=== Torpedo ===
In 1960 club was renamed Torpedo. They played in city competitions and oblast cup. They also returned to play in first league in 1961. From 1961 to 1985 club played in first league, never finishing above fourth place. They reached the final of oblast cup twice in 1963 and 1965 where they lost. In city championship they won twenty-three times from 1961 to 2004. They also won city cup seventeen times in that span. Beginning 1991 club only took part in city competitions. From 2005 they only have a minifootball team.

Club played it's matches at Torpedo Stadium

== Name change ==
- Feniks Lubny (1921–1927)
- Komunar Lubny (1928–1941)
- Batkivshchyna Lubny (1947–1952)
- Saliut Lubny (1952–1953)
- Torpedo Lubny (1954–1957)
- Avanhard Lubny (1958–1959)
- Torpedo Lubny (from 1960)

== Honours ==
Poltava Oblast Championship

Second League

Winners (2): 1957, 1989

Poltava Oblast Cup

Runners-up (4): 1952, 1958, 1963, 1965

Lubny Championship

Winners (34): 1928, 1947, 1948, 1949, 1950, 1951, 1952, 1953, 1954, 1955, 1956, 1961, 1962, 1965, 1968, 1970, 1971, 1972, 1973, 1974, 1976, 1981, 1983, 1985, 1987, 1988, 1989, 1990, 1991, 1995, 1996, 1998, 1999, 2004
Runners-up (8): 1978, 1979, 1994, 1997, 2000, 2001, 2002, 2003
Third place (1): 1964

Lubny Cup

Winners (25): 1948, 1949, 1950, 1951, 1952, 1953, 1955, 1956, 1961, 1962, 1963, 1967, 1968, 1974, 1977, 1981, 1982, 1987, 1988, 1989, 1990, 1991, 1996, 1998, 1999
Runners-up (4): 1954 ,1973, 1995, 1997

== Managers ==
- Mykola Sverhunenko (1947–1948)
- Leonid Volkov (1948–1961)
- Mykhailo Nezhynskyi (1961–1991)
- Serhii Yatlenk
- Oleksandr Serdiuk (1988–1989)
- Volodymyr Karetnyk (1992–2008)

== Sources ==
- Lomov, Anatolii; Stadnychenko, Oleksandr (2009), 100 Років Полтавському Футболу [100 Years of Poltava Football] (in Ukrainian), Poltava: Poltava, ISBN 978-966-97035-0-7
- Lomov, Anatolii; Kryvorotko, Serhii (2010), Энциклопеди Полтавского Футбола (1909-2010) [Encyclopedia of Poltava Football (1909-2010)] (in Russian), Poltava: OOO "ASMI", ISBN 978-966-182-118-6
- Klykovskyi, Serhii (2010), Лубенському футболу 90 років [90 Years of Football in Lubny] (in Ukrainian), Lubny
- Pyrukhin, Yurii, Энциклопедия кременчугского футбола [Encyclopedia of Kremenchuk football] (in Russian), Kremenchuk
