= Yury Khadaronak =

Belarusian footballer

Personal information
- Full name: Yury Mikhaylavich Khadaronak
- Date of birth: 24 April 1965 (age 61)
- Height: 1.76 m (5 ft 9 1/2 in)
- Positions: Forward; midfielder

Youth career
- 1983–1986: Dinamo Minsk

Senior career*
Years	Team	Apps	(Gls)
1986	Shakhtyor Soligorsk		
1986–1987	Dinamo Minsk	0	(0)
1987	Khimik Grodno	1	(0)
1987	Torpedo Minsk		
1989–1990	Metallurg Aldan		
1990	KIM Vitebsk	31	(4)
1991	Metallurg Molodechno	23	(4)
1991–1993	Chemik Police		
1993	Luch Vladivostok	9	(0)
1994–1998	Samotlor-XXI Nizhnevartovsk	27	(9)
2000	Veras Nesvizh	7	(1)
- * Club domestic league appearances and goals

Yury Mikhaylavich Khadaronak (Belarusian: Юры Міхайлавіч Хадаронак; Russian: Юрий Михайлович Ходоронок, Yuri Mikhaylovich Khodoronok; born 24 April 1965) is a former Belarusian football player.

== Honours ==
Metallurg Molodechno

- Belarusian SSR League champion: 1991
- Soviet Amateur Cup winner: 1991
