= Sergei Borovsky =

Belarusian football coach and player

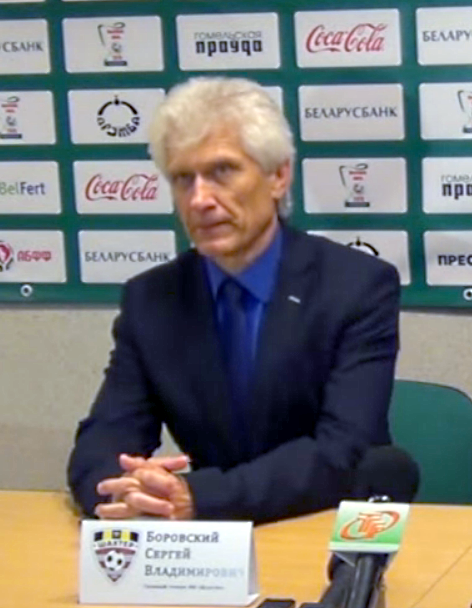
- Borovsky in 2015

Personal information
- Full name: Sergei Vladimirovich Borovsky
- Date of birth: 29 January 1956 (age 70)
- Place of birth: Minsk, USSR
- Height: 1.75 m (5 ft 9 in)
- Position: Defender

Team information
- Current team: Isloch Minsk Raion (assistant coach)

Senior career*
Years	Team	Apps	(Gls)
1973–1987	Dinamo Minsk	400	(8)

International career
1981–1985	USSR	21	(0)

Managerial career
- 1989–1994: Molodechno
- 1994–1996: Belarus
- 1997–1998: Ventspils
- 1998–1999: Sheriff Tiraspol
- 1999–2000: Belarus
- 2002: Torpedo-MAZ Minsk
- 2003–2004: FBK Kaunas
- 2004: Metalurh Zaporizhzhia
- 2004: Belshina Bobruisk
- 2005: Vėtra
- 2006: Dinamo Brest
- 2009–2010: SKVICH Minsk
- 2010–2011: Vitebsk
- 2011–2012: SKVICH Minsk
- 2012–2013: Kazakhstan U21
- 2014–2015: Shakhtyor Soligorsk
- 2016–2017: Dinamo Minsk
- 2019–: Isloch Minsk Raion (assistant)
- * Club domestic league appearances and goals

Sergei Vladimirovich Borovsky (Russian: Серге́й Владимирович Боровский; Belarusian: Сяргей Уладзіміравіч Бароўскі; born 29 January 1956) is a football coach and former player.

== Career ==
During his club career he played for FC Dinamo Minsk. He earned 21 caps for the USSR national football team, and participated in the 1982 FIFA World Cup. He won the Soviet Union premier league in 1982.

== Managerial career ==
He managed the Belarus national football team from 1994 to 1996 and from 1999 to 2000.

From 2016 till May 2017 he managed Dinamo Minsk.

== Honours ==
=== As player ===
Dinamo Minsk

- Soviet Top League champion: 1982

=== As coach ===
Metallurg Molodechno

- Belarusian SSR League champion: 1991
- Soviet Amateur Cup winner: 1991

Sheriff Tiraspol

- Moldovan Cup winner: 1998–99

FBK Kaunas

- A Lyga champion: 2003

Shakhtyor Soligorsk

- Belarusian Cup winner: 2013–14
