= 1958 Soviet Amateur Cup =

Tournament details
- Country: Soviet Union
- Teams: 17

Final positions
- Champions: Dynamo Moscow
- Runners-up: Trud Ramenskoye

The 1958 Soviet Amateur Cup was the 2nd season of the Soviet Union's football knockout competition for amateur football teams.

== Participated clubs ==
- Azerbaijan SSR (1): OSC Baku
- Armenian SSR (1): Trikotazhnik Kirovokan
- Belarusian SSR (1): Traktor Minsk
- Estonian SSR (1): Kalev Ülemiste
- Georgian SSR (1): Dinamo Batumi
- Kazakh SSR (1): Stroitel Pavlodar
- Kyrgyz SSR (1): Khimik Kalininskoye
- Latvian SSR (1): Daugava Riga
- Lithuanian SSR (1): Spartak Vilnius
- Moldavian SSR (1): Lokomotiv Kishinev
- Russian SFSR (3): Dinamo Moscow (Moscow), GOMZ Leningrad (Leningrad), Trud Ramenskoye
- Tajik SSR (1): Pedinstitut Leninabad
- Turkmen SSR (1): Krasnyi metallist Ashkhabad
- Uzbek SSR (1): Start Tashkent
- Ukrainian SSR (1): Torpedo Kharkov

== Competition schedule ==
=== Qualification round ===
Team 1	Score	Team 2
Torpedo Kharkov	3–3	Start Tashkent

Replay

Team 1	Score	Team 2
Torpedo Kharkov	8–1	Start Tashkent

=== Round of 16 ===
Team 1	Score	Team 2
OSC Baku	1–6	Dinamo Batumi
Trikotazhnik Kirovokan	3–1	Pedinstitut Leninabad
Krasnyi metallist Ashkhabad	2–1	Traktor Minsk
Kalev Ülemiste	4–3	Stroitel Pavlodar
GOMZ Leningrad	4–0	Khimik Kalininskoye
Spartak Vilnius	2–1	Daugava Riga
Dynamo Moscow	5–1	Lokomotiv Kishinev
Trud Ramenskoye	3–1	Torpedo Kharkov

=== Quarterfinals (1/4) ===
Team 1	Score	Team 2
Trud Ramenskoye	1–1	Trikotazhnik Kirovokan
Dinamo Batumi	1–1	GOMZ Leningrad
Krasnyi metallist Ashkhabad	1–1	Spartak Vilnius
Kalev Ülemiste	0–3	Dynamo Moscow

Replays

Team 1	Score	Team 2
Trud Ramenskoye	2–0	Trikotazhnik Kirovokan
Dinamo Batumi	1–1	GOMZ Leningrad
Dinamo Batumi	1–0	GOMZ Leningrad
Krasnyi metallist Ashkhabad	1–3	Spartak Vilnius

=== Semifinals (1/2) ===
Team 1	Score	Team 2
Trud Ramenskoye	4–0	Dinamo Batumi
Dynamo Moscow	1–0	Spartak Vilnius

=== Final ===
Team 1	Score	Team 2
Dynamo Moscow	2–2	Trud Ramenskoye

Replay

Team 1	Score	Team 2
Dynamo Moscow	5–1	Trud Ramenskoye

Winner of the 1958 Soviet Football Cup among amateur teams
Dynamo Moscow (Moscow); 1st time

== See also ==
- 1958 Soviet Cup
