= 1958 Cup of the Ukrainian SSR =

1958 Ukrainian Cup
Tournament details
- Country: Soviet Union (Ukrainian SSR)

Final positions
- Champions: FC Torpedo Kharkiv
- Runners-up: FC Avanhard Ternopil
- Soviet Amateur Cup: FC Torpedo Kharkiv

The 1958 Ukrainian Cup was a football knockout competition conducting by the Football Federation of the Ukrainian SSR and was known as the Ukrainian Cup.

The winner of the 1958 Ukrainian Cup, Torpedo Kharkiv, qualified for the 1958 Soviet Amateur Cup.

== Teams ==
=== Tournament distribution ===
The competition was conducted among 21 clubs out of 80 participants of the 1958 Football Championship and 7 other non-"teams of masters" FC Uzyn, Shakhta Holubivka Kadiivka, Spartak Shopla, FC KremHESbud, Budivelnyk Mykolaiv, Avanhard Pryluky, Metalist Sevastopol.

First round (24 teams)	18 entrants from the Football Championship; 6 other entrants	
Second round (16 teams)	3 entrants from the Football Championship; FC Metalist Sevastopol	12 winners from the First round

=== Non-participating "teams of masters" ===
The Ukrainian teams of masters did not take part in the competition.

- 1958 Soviet Class A: FC Dynamo Kyiv, FC Shakhtar Stalino
- 1958 Soviet Class B: SKVO Odessa, FC Avanhard Mykolaiv, FC Spartak Kherson, FC Zirka Kirovohrad, SKCF Sevastopol, FC Metalurh Zaporizhia, FC Trudovi Rezervy Luhansk, FC Kolhospnyk Poltava, FC Metalurh Dnipropetrovsk, FC Avanhard Kharkiv, FC Kolhospnyk Cherkasy, FC Khimik Dniprodzerzhynsk, FC Avanhard Simferopol, SKVO Lvov, FC Lokomotyv Vinnytsia, FC Spartak Uzhhorod, FC Spartak Stanislav, SKVO Kiev, FC Pischevik Odesa, FC Avanhard Rivno, FC Lokomotyv Stalino, FC Shakhtar Kadiivka

== Competition schedule ==
=== First elimination round ===
FC Avanhard Chernivtsi (Rep)	4:2	(Rep) FC Khimik Kalush
FC Naftovyk Drohobych (Rep)	3:2	(Rep) FC Avanhard Vynohradovo
FC Uzyn	0:5	(Rep) FC Avanhard Zhytomyr (Note: see FC Polissya Zhytomyr)
FC Torpedo Sumy (Rep)	0:3	(Rep) FC Torpedo Kharkiv
FC Azovstal Zhdanov (Note: see FC Mariupol) (Rep)	2:0	FC Shakhta Holubivka Kadiivka
FC Lokomotyv Poltava (Rep)	6:0	FC Spartak Shpola
FC Metalurh Kerch (Rep)	2:3	(Rep) FC Metalurh Nikopol (Note: see FC Elektrometalurh Nikopol)
FC KremHESbud	2:0	FC Budivelnyk Mykolaiv
FC Avanhard Kherson (Rep)	1:2	(Rep) SKVO Odessa
FC Avanhard Pryluky	2:1	(Rep) FC Torpedo Kyiv
GDO? Lutsk (Rep)	+:–	(Rep) FC Vinnytsia
FC Dynamo Khmelnytskyi (Rep)	+:–	(Rep) FC Spartak Dubno

=== Second elimination round ===
Byes: Avanhard Ternopil, Avanhard Lviv, Mashynobudivnyk Zaporizhia, Metalist Sevastopol

FC Avanhard Ternopil (Rep)	4:0	(Rep) FC Avanhard Lviv
FC Avanhard Chernivtsi (Rep)	3:0	(Rep) FC Naftovyk Drohobych
GDO? Lutsk (Rep)	3:1	(Rep) FC Dynamo Khmelnytskyi
FC Avanhard Zhytomyr (Rep)	4:0	FC Avanhard Pryluky
FC Torpedo Kharkiv (Rep)	4:1	(Rep) FC Azovstal Zhdanov
SKVO Odessa (Rep)	1:0	(Rep) FC Lokomotyv Poltava
FC Metalurh Nikopol (Rep)	3:1	FC KremHESbud
FC Mashynobudivnyk Zaporizhia (Rep)	3:2	FC Metalist Sevastopol

=== Quarterfinals ===
FC Avanhard Ternopil (Rep)	2:1	(Rep) FC Avanhard Chernivtsi
GDO? Lutsk (Rep)	3:1	(Rep) FC Avanhard Zhytomyr
FC Mashynobudivnyk Zaporizhia (Rep)	0:2	(Rep) FC Torpedo Kharkiv
SKVO Odessa (Rep)	2:0	(Rep) FC Metalurh Nikopol

=== Semifinals ===
FC Avanhard Ternopil (Rep)	1:0	(Rep) GDO? Lutsk
FC Torpedo Kharkiv (Rep)	0:0	(Rep) SKVO Odessa	(replay)

Replay

FC Torpedo Kharkiv (Rep)	3:2	(Rep) SKVO Odessa

=== Final ===
2 September 1958

FC Avanhard Ternopil (Rep)	1–2 (a.e.t.)	(Rep) FC Torpedo Kharkiv
Toropov; Shchurykov (red card) 120'	Report	61' ? 120' ? (red card) 120' Solodovnykov

Spartak Stadium, Ternopil
- Torpedo: Yevhen Vlasenko, Zhemerykin, Anatoliy Neskorodev, Hurovyi, Solodovnykov, Vyacheslav Halkin, Volodymyr Fursov, Mykhailo Sadyk, Leonid Aksenov, Petro Laptev, Yevhen Dohadyn, Voronyn. Head Coach: Dmytro Vasylyev

== Top goalscorers ==
Scorer	Goals	Team
(Ukrainian Soviet Socialist Republic)	?	

Ukrainian Cup 1958 Winners

FC Torpedo Kharkiv
First title

== See also ==
- Soviet Cup
- Ukrainian Cup
