= 1959 Soviet Amateur Cup =

Tournament details
- Country: Soviet Union
- Teams: 17

Final positions
- Champions: Spartak Moscow
- Runners-up: ZIP Krasnodar

The 1959 Soviet Amateur Cup was the 3rd season of the Soviet Union's football knockout competition for amateur football teams.

== Participated clubs ==
- Azerbaijan SSR (1): Neftianik Kuba
- Armenian SSR (1): Trikotazhnik Kirovokan
- Belarusian SSR (1): Zavod imeni Voroshilova Minsk
- Estonian SSR (1): Kalev Ülemiste
- Georgian SSR (1): Kolmeurne Makharadze
- Kazakh SSR (1): Spartak Alma-Ata
- Kyrgyz SSR (1): Selmash Frunze
- Latvian SSR (1): SKVO Riga
- Lithuanian SSR (1): Elnias Siauliai
- Moldavian SSR (1): KSKhI Kishinev
- Russian SFSR (3): Spartak Moscow (Moscow), Komsomolets Leningrad (Leningrad), ZIP Krasnodar
- Tajik SSR (1): Dinamo Stalinabad
- Turkmen SSR (1): DOSA Ashkhabad
- Uzbek SSR (1): Khimik Chirchik
- Ukrainian SSR (1): Shakhtar Korostyshiv

== Competition schedule ==
=== Qualification round ===
Team 1	Score	Team 2
Khimik Chirchik	1–2	Kolmeurne Makharadze

=== Round of 16 ===
Team 1	Score	Team 2
Neftianik Kuba	1–3	KSKhI Kishinev
ZIP Krasnodar	1–0	Trikotazhnik Kirovokan
Zavod imeni Voroshilova Minsk	1–2	SKVO Riga
Kalev Ülemiste	0–1	Kolmeurne Makharadze
Shakhtar Korostyshiv	3–2	Spartak Alma-Ata
Selmash Frunze	2–1	DOSA Ashkhabad
Elnias Siauliai	0–2	Spartak Moscow
Komsomolets Leningrad	4–1	Dinamo Stalinabad

=== Quarterfinals (1/4) ===
Team 1	Score	Team 2
Kolmeurne Makharadze	4–1	SKVO Riga
Spartak Moscow	4–1	Selmash Frunze
KSKhI Kishinev	0–3	Shakhtar Korostyshiv
ZIP Krasnodar	3–1	Komsomolets Leningrad

=== Semifinals (1/2) ===
Team 1	Score	Team 2
Kolmeurne Makharadze	1–2	Spartak Moscow
ZIP Krasnodar	5–1	Shakhtar Korostyshiv

=== Final ===
Team 1	Score	Team 2
Spartak Moscow	1–0	ZIP Krasnodar

Winner of the 1959 Soviet Football Cup among amateur teams
Spartak Moscow (Moscow); 1st time

== See also ==
- 1959–60 Soviet Cup
