= 1960 Soviet Amateur Cup =

Tournament details
- Country: Soviet Union
- Teams: 32

Final positions
- Champions: Zhdanovets Leningrad
- Runners-up: Start Chuguyev

The 1960 Soviet Amateur Cup was the 4th season of the Soviet Union's football knockout competition for amateur football teams.

== Participated clubs ==
- Azerbaijan SSR (1): Truboprokatnyi zavod Sumgait
- Armenian SSR (1): Kozhobrabotka Yerevan
- Belarusian SSR (2): Sputnik Minsk (cup holder), Traktor Minsk (finalist)
- Estonian SSR (1): Vympel Tallinn
- Georgian SSR (1): Kolmeurne Makharadze
- Kazakh SSR (2): Avangard Petropavlovsk (cup holder), Torpedo Ust-Kamenogorsk (finalist)
- Kyrgyz SSR (1): Rekord Kalininskoye
- Latvian SSR (1): VEF Riga
- Lithuanian SSR (1): Panyamune Kaunas
- Moldavian SSR (1): KSKhI Kishinev
- Russian SFSR (3): Dynamo-3 Moscow (Moscow cup holder), Dynamo-7 Moscow (Moscow finalist), Zhdanovets Leningrad (Leningrad), Mashzavod Chita (Far East), Trud Barnaul (Siberia), Bumazhnik Volzhsk (Ural), Shakhta No. 1 Vorkuta (North), Avtopribor Vladimir (Upper Volga), Trud Saratov (Volga), Trud Ramenskoye (Center), Aviauchilische Yeisk (South), Pischevik Beslan (North Caucasus)
- Tajik SSR (1): Pogranichnik Stalinabad
- Turkmen SSR (1): Sudoremontnyk zavod Chardzhou
- Uzbek SSR (1): Zvezda Tashkent
- Ukrainian SSR (5): Start Chuguyev (cup holder), Avangard Shostka (finalist), Bolshevik Kiev, Metallurg Nikopol, Khimik Kalush

== Competition schedule ==
=== Round of 32 ===
Team 1	Score	Team 2
Zvezda Tashkent	0–3	Torpedo Ust-Kamenogorsk
Pogranichnik Stalinabad	3–0	Mashinostroitelnyi zavod Chita (Note: In another source, Mashzavod Chita)
Avangard Petropavlovsk	3–5	Trud Barnaul
Bumkombinat Volzhsk (Note: In another source, Bumazhnik Volzhsk)	1–0	Khimik (Note: In another source, Rekord Kalininskoye)
Aviauchilische Yeisk	2–0	artel "Kozhobrabotka" Yerevan (Note: In another source, Kozhobrabotka Yerevan)
Avangard Shostka	2–1	Sudoremzavod Chardzhou (Note: In another source, Sudoremontnyi zavod Chardzhou)
Start Chuguyev	2–1	zavod imeni Lenina Sumgait (Note: In another source, Truboprokatnyi zavod Sumgait)
sovkhoz Makharadze (Note: In another source, Kolmeurne Makharadze)	5–0	Maisovyi kombinat Beslan (Note: In another source, Pischevik Beslan)
zavod Bolshevik Kiev (Note: In another source, Bolshevik Kiev)	3–4	shakhta No.1 Kapitalnaya Vorkuta
Dinamo-3 Moscow (19th raisovet)	3–0	Trud Vladimir (Note: In another source, Avtopribor Vladimir)
Traktornyi zavod Minsk	3–3	Khimik Kalush
Vympel Tallin	0–5	Zhdanovets Leningrad (Dynamo-5)
Metallurg Nikopol	1–0	Trud Ramenskoye
Selkhozinstitut Kishenev (Note: In another source, KSKhI Kishenev)	1–4	Krasnoye Znamia Minsk (Note: In another source, Sputnik Minsk)
zavod VEF Riga (Note: In another source, VEF Riga)	0–1	Dinamo-7 Moscow
Panemune Kaunas (Note: In another source, Paniamune Kaunas)	0–2	Trud Saratov

Replay

Team 1	Score	Team 2
Traktornyi zavod Minsk (Note: In another source, Traktor Minsk)	1–0	Khimik Kalush

=== Round of 16 ===
Team 1	Score	Team 2
Torpedo Ust-Kamenogorsk	3–2	Pogranichnik Stalinabad
Trud Barnaul	4–1	Bumkombinat Volzhsk
Aviauchilische Yeisk	2–0	Avangard Shostka
Start Chuguyev	3–2	sovkhoz Makharadze
shakhta No.1 Vorkuta	2–2	Dinamo-3 Moscow
Zhdanovets Leningrad	4–1	Traktornyi zavod Minsk
Krasnoye Znamia Minsk	3–0	Metallurg Nikopol
Dinamo-7 Moscow	5–3	Trud Saratov

Replay

Team 1	Score	Team 2
shakhta No.1 Vorkuta	2–1	Dinamo-3 Moscow

=== Quarterfinals (1/4) ===
Team 1	Score	Team 2
Torpedo Ust-Kamenogorsk	6–4	Trud Barnaul
Start Chuguyev	3–2	Aviauchilische Yeisk
Zhdanovets Leningrad	3–0	shakhta No.1 Vorkuta
Dinamo-7 Moscow	3–0	Krasnoye Znamia Minsk

=== Semifinals (1/2) ===
Team 1	Score	Team 2
Start Chuguyev	2–0	Torpedo Ust-Kamenogorsk
Zhdanovets Leningrad	3–1	Dinamo-7 Moscow

=== Final ===
The final took place in Luhansk

Team 1	Score	Team 2
Zdanovets Leningrad	1–1	Start Chuguyev

Replay

Team 1	Score	Team 2
Zdanovets Leningrad	2–1 (a.e.t.)	Start Chuguyev

Winner of the 1960 Soviet Football Cup among amateur teams
Zdanovets Leningrad (Leningrad)
1st time

== See also ==
- 1959–60 Soviet Cup
