= 1958 Football Championship of the Ukrainian SSR =

Football Championship of UkrSSR
- Season: 1958
- Champions: Mashynobudivnyk Kyiv

The 1958 Football Championship of UkrSSR were part of the 1958 Soviet republican football competitions in the Soviet Ukraine.

== First group stage ==
=== Group 1 ===
Pos	Team	Pld	W	D	L	GF	GA	GD	Pts	Qualification
1	Mashynobudivnyk Kyiv	13	10	3	0	61	12	+49	23	Advanced to next stage
2	Burevisnyk Kamianets-Podilskyi	13	6	5	2	27	11	+16	17	
3	Avanhard Ternopil	13	6	4	3	28	17	+11	16	
4	Shakhtar Korostyshiv	13	4	4	5	24	37	−13	12	
5	Dynamo Khmelnytskyi	13	3	6	4	16	31	−15	12	
6	Avanhard Zhytormyr	13	3	5	5	18	22	−4	11	Cup of the UkrSSR
7	Lokomotyv Zhmerynka	13	2	3	8	15	37	−22	7	
8	Avanhard Mohyliv-Podilskyi	7	0	0	7	6	28	−22	0	

=== Group 2 ===
Pos	Team	Pld	W	D	L	GF	GA	GD	Pts	Qualification
1	Zhovtnevyi Raion Kyiv	14	11	1	2	34	12	+22	23	Advanced to next stage
2	Shakhtar Konotop	14	8	2	4	33	19	+14	18	
3	DRVZ Kyiv	14	7	3	4	30	20	+10	17	
4	Avanhard Shostka	14	6	3	5	21	17	+4	15	
5	Torpedo Sumy	14	5	4	5	29	21	+8	14	Cup of the UkrSSR
6	Vinnytsia	14	4	2	8	22	26	−4	10	
7	Nizhyn	14	3	2	9	21	53	−32	8	
8	Avanhard Chernihiv	14	1	5	8	8	30	−22	7	

=== Group 3 ===
Pos	Team	Pld	W	D	L	GF	GA	GD	Pts	Qualification
1	Avanhard Odesa	14	11	1	2	31	9	+22	23	Advanced to next stage
2	Avanhard Kriukiv	14	8	2	4	26	18	+8	18	
3	Shakhtar Vatutine	14	7	2	5	23	13	+10	16	
4	Torpedo Kyiv	14	5	4	5	19	15	+4	14	
5	Shakhtar Oleksandriya	14	4	6	4	20	21	−1	14	
6	Avanhard Mykolaiv	14	5	4	5	12	13	−1	14	
7	Spartak Bila Tserkva	14	3	3	8	11	20	−9	9	
8	Spartak Cherkasy	14	0	4	10	14	47	−33	4	

=== Group 4 ===
Pos	Team	Pld	W	D	L	GF	GA	GD	Pts	Qualification
1	Metalurh Nikopol	14	12	2	0	47	14	+33	26	Advanced to next stage
2	SKA Odessa (am)	14	7	5	2	29	13	+16	19	
3	Torpedo Mykolaiv	14	7	4	3	31	26	+5	18	
4	Avanhard Kherson	14	6	0	8	22	27	−5	12	
5	Avanhard Sevastopol	14	4	4	6	24	32	−8	12	
6	Avanhard Kirovohrad	14	4	3	7	24	40	−16	11	
7	Lokomotyv Poltava	14	3	3	8	20	32	−12	9	
8	Pervomaisk	14	1	3	10	15	28	−13	5	

=== Group 5 ===
Pos	Team	Pld	W	D	L	GF	GA	GD	Pts	Qualification
1	Naftovyk Drohobych	14	11	3	0	41	11	+30	25	Advanced to next stage Cup of the UkrSSR
2	Avanhard Chernivtsi	14	9	4	1	37	9	+28	22	Cup of the UkrSSR
3	Avanhard Uzhhorod	14	8	3	3	24	16	+8	19	
4	Avanhard Kolomyia	14	5	2	7	27	37	−10	12	
5	GDO Lutsk	14	5	1	8	23	23	0	11	
6	Avanhard Zdolbuniv	14	4	3	7	16	29	−13	11	
7	Avanhard Vynohradiv	14	3	2	9	13	31	−18	8	Cup of the UkrSSR
8	Avanhard Stanislav	14	1	2	11	20	44	−24	4	

=== Group 6 ===
Pos	Team	Pld	W	D	L	GF	GA	GD	Pts	Qualification
1	Avanhard Mukacheve	14	10	1	3	33	19	+14	21	Advanced to next stage
2	Kolhospnyk Hoshcha	14	8	3	3	42	19	+23	19	
3	Khimik Kalush	14	8	0	6	33	20	+13	16	Cup of the UkrSSR
4	Dynamo Chernivtsi	14	7	2	5	19	18	+1	16	
5	Kolhospnyk Berehove	14	5	2	7	21	27	−6	12	
6	Avanhard Lviv	14	4	2	8	22	35	−13	10	
7	Spartak Dubno	14	5	0	9	16	30	−14	10	
8	Shakhtar Novovolynsk	14	3	2	9	9	27	−18	8	

=== Group 7 ===
Pos	Team	Pld	W	D	L	GF	GA	GD	Pts	Qualification
1	Avanhard Kharkiv	14	10	2	2	31	11	+20	22	Advanced to next stage
2	Metalurh Kerch	14	8	3	3	26	17	+9	19	
3	Shakhtar Smolianka	14	7	4	3	30	17	+13	18	
4	Avanhard Velykyi Tokmak	14	6	2	6	30	33	−3	14	
5	Mashynobudivnyk Dnipropetrovsk	14	5	3	6	27	17	+10	13	
6	Avanhard Zhdanov	14	5	2	7	19	25	−6	12	
7	Shakhtar Krasnodon	14	4	4	6	14	28	−14	12	
8	Metalurh Staline	14	0	2	12	3	32	−29	2	

=== Group 8 ===
Pos	Team	Pld	W	D	L	GF	GA	GD	Pts	Qualification
1	Avanhard Zhovti Vody	14	6	6	2	17	11	+6	18	Advanced to next stage
2	Avanhard Kramatorsk	14	8	2	4	24	15	+9	18	Advanced to next stage
3	Chuhuyiv	14	6	4	4	22	15	+7	16	
4	Budivelnyk Zaporizhia	14	8	0	6	38	30	+8	16	
5	Shakhtar Bryanka	14	5	6	3	16	13	+3	16	
6	Shakhtar Budyonivka	14	5	4	5	28	24	+4	14	
7	Metalurh Dniprodzerzhynsk	14	3	1	10	11	29	−18	7	
8	Khimik Rubizhne	14	1	5	8	13	32	−19	7	

=== Group 9 ===
Pos	Team	Pld	W	D	L	GF	GA	GD	Pts	Qualification
1	Burevisnyk Melitopol	14	11	3	0	45	5	+40	25	Advanced to next stage
2	Avanhard Ordzhonikidze	14	8	2	4	24	19	+5	18	
3	Khimik Severodonetsk	14	7	3	4	28	16	+12	17	
4	Shakhtar Terny	14	7	3	4	25	21	+4	17	
5	Metalurh Voroshylovsk	14	6	2	6	20	24	−4	14	
6	Shakhtar Chystyakove	14	3	5	6	11	26	−15	11	
7	Avanhard Berdyansk	14	1	5	8	10	29	−19	7	
8	Ordzhonikidze Factory Chasiv Yar	14	0	3	11	8	31	−23	3	

=== Group 10 ===
Pos	Team	Pld	W	D	L	GF	GA	GD	Pts	Qualification
1	Torpedo Kharkiv	14	8	4	2	35	10	+25	20	Advanced to next stage Cup of the UkrSSR
2	Metalurh Kryvyi Rih	14	8	4	2	35	11	+24	20	Advanced to next stage
3	Avanhard Yenakieve	14	6	4	4	20	18	+2	16	
4	Shakhtar Sverdlovsk	14	6	4	4	16	17	−1	16	
5	Mashynobudivnyk Zaporizhia	14	6	3	5	20	21	−1	15	
6	Shakhtar Horlivka	14	5	2	7	19	17	+2	12	
7	Lokomotyv Lozova	14	1	6	7	19	36	−17	8	
8	Avanhard Luhansk	14	1	3	10	19	51	−32	5	

== Second group stage ==
=== Group 1 ===
Pos	Team	Pld	W	D	L	GF	GA	GD	Pts	Qualification
1	Naftovyk Drohobych	5	5	0	0	12	3	+9	10	Advanced to next stage
2	Mashynobudivnyk Kyiv	5	3	1	1	8	5	+3	7	Advanced to next stage
3	Avanhard Kharkiv	5	3	0	2	10	7	+3	6	
4	Avanhard Zhovti Vody	5	1	1	3	10	10	0	3	
5	Avanhard Mukacheve	5	1	1	3	3	11	−8	3	
6	Metalurh Kryvyi Rih	5	0	1	4	5	12	−7	1	

=== Group 2 ===
Pos	Team	Pld	W	D	L	GF	GA	GD	Pts	Qualification
1	Metalurh Nikopol	5	3	1	1	4	4	0	7	Advanced to next stage
2	Torpedo Kharkiv	5	2	2	1	10	4	+6	6	Advanced to next stage
3	Burevisnyk Melitopol	5	2	2	1	6	4	+2	6	
4	Avanhard Kramatorsk	5	1	3	1	3	5	−2	5	
5	Zhovtnevyi Raion Kyiv	5	1	2	2	3	5	−2	4	
6	Avanhard Odesa	5	1	0	4	3	7	−4	2	

== Final ==
Pos	Team	Pld	W	D	L	GF	GA	GD	Pts	Qualification
1	Mashynobudivnyk Kyiv	3	2	1	0	5	2	+3	5	Qualified for promotion play-off
2	Metalurh Nikopol	3	1	2	0	4	2	+2	4	
3	Naftovyk Drohobych	3	1	0	2	5	6	−1	2	
4	Torpedo Kharkiv	3	0	1	2	3	7	−4	1	

== Promotion play-off ==
- FC Chornomorets Odesa – FC Mashynobudivnyk Kyiv 3:0 2:2

=== Promoted ===
Arsenal Kyiv, Avanhard Zhytomyr (6th in group 1), Avanhard Kryvyi Rih, Avanhard Ternopil (3rd in group 1), Shakhtar Horlivka (6th in group 10)

== Ukrainian clubs at the All-Union level ==
The Ukrainian SSR was presented with 24 teams of masters (exhibition teams) at the All-Union level:

- Group A (2): Dynamo Kyiv, Shakhtar Stalino
- Group B (22): SKVO Odesa, Avanhard Mykolaiv, Spartak Kherson, Zirka Kirovohrad // SCCF Sevastopol, Metalurh Zaporizhia, Trudovi Rezervy Luhansk, Kolhospnyk Poltava, Metalurh Dnipropetrovsk, Avanhard Kharkiv, Kolhospnyk Cherkasy, Khimik Dniprodzerzhynsk, Avanhard Simferopol // SKVO Lviv, Lokomotyv Vinnytsia, Spartak Uzhhorod, Spartak Stanislav, SKVO Kyiv, Chornomorets Odesa, Kolhospnyk Rivno // Lokomotyv Stalino, Shakhtar Kadiivka

== Number of teams by region ==
Number	Region	Team(s)	
Number	Region	Ukrainian SSR	All-Union
9 (2)	Donetsk Oblast	Shakhtar Smolianka, Avanhard Zhdanov, Metalurh Stalino, Avanhard Kramatorsk, Shakhtar Budyonivka, Shakhtar Chystiakove, z-d imeni Ordzhonikidze Chasiv Yar, Avanhard Yenakieve, Shakhtar Horilvka	Shakhtar Stalino, Lokomotyv Stalino
7 (2)	Luhansk Oblast	Shakhtar Krasnodon, Shakhtar Bryanka, Khimik Rubizhne, Khimik Severodonetsk, Metalurh Voroshylovsk, Shakhtar Sverdlovsk, Avanhard Luhansk	Trudovi Rezervy Luhansk, Shakhtar Kadiivka
7 (2)	Dnipropetrovsk Oblast	Metalurh Nikopol, Mashynobudivnyk Dnipropetrovsk, Avanhard Zhovti Vody, Metalurh Dniprodzerzhynsk, Avanhard Ordzhonikidze, Shakhtar Terny, Metalurh Kryvyi Rih	Metalurh Dnipropetrovsk, Khimik Dniprodzerzhynsk
5 (2)	Kyiv Oblast	Mashynobudivnyk Kyiv, Zhovtnevyi Raion (Temp) Kyiv, DRVZ Kyiv, Torpedo Kyiv, Spartak Bila Tserkva	Dynamo Kyiv, SKA Kyiv
5 (1)	Zaporizhia Oblast	Avanhard Velykyi Tokmak, Budivelnyk Zaporizhia, Burevisnyk Melitopol, Avanhard Berdiansk, Mashynobudivnyk Zaporizhia	Metalurh Zaporizhia
4 (1)	Kharkiv Oblast	Avanhard Kharkiv (klubnaya), Chuhuiv, Torpedo Kharkiv, Lokomotyv Lozova	Avanhard Kharkiv
4 (1)	Zakarpattia Oblast	Avanhard Uzhhorod, Avanhard Vynohradove, Avanhard Mukachevo, Kolhospnyk Berehove	Spartak Uzhhorod
3 (1)	Mykolaiv Oblast	Avanhard Mykolaiv (klubnaya), Torpedo Mykolaiv, Pervomaisk	Avanhard Mykolaiv
3 (1)	Vinnytsia Oblast	Lokomotyv Zhmerynka, Avanhard Mohiliv-Podilskyi, Vinnytsia	Lokomotyv Vinnytsia
3 (1)	Ivano-Frankivsk Oblast	Avanhard Kolomyia, Avanhard Stanislav, Khimik Kalush	Spartak Stanislav
3 (1)	Rivne Oblast	Avanhard Zdolbuniv, Kolhospnyk Hoshcha, Spartak Dubno	Kolhospnyk Rivne
3 (0)	Sumy Oblast	Shakhtar Konotop, Avanhard Shostka, Torpedo Sumy	–
2 (2)	Odesa Oblast	Avanhard Odesa, SKA Odesa (klubnaya)	Chornomorets Odesa, SKA Odesa
2 (2)	Crimea	Avanhard Sevastopol, Metalurh Kerch	SKCF Sevastopol, Avanhard Simferopol
2 (1)	Kirovohrad Oblast	Shakhtar Oleksandriya, Avanhard Kirovohrad	Zirka Kirovohrad
2 (1)	Poltava Oblast	Avanhard Kryukiv, Lokomotyv Poltava	Kolhospnyk Poltava
2 (1)	Cherkasy Oblast	Shakhtar Vatutine, Spartak Cherkasy	Kolhospnyk Cherkasy
2 (0)	Zhytomyr Oblast	Shakhtar Korostyshiv, Avanhard Zhytomyr	–
2 (0)	Volyn Oblast	GDO Lutsk, Shakhtar Novovolynsk	–
2 (0)	Chernihiv Oblast	Nizhyn, Avanhard Chernihiv	–
2 (0)	Khmelnytskyi Oblast	Burevisnyk Kamianets-Podilskyi, Dynamo Khmelnytskyi	–
2 (0)	Chernivtsi Oblast	Avanhard Chernivtsi, Dynamo Chernivtsi	–
1 (1)	Kherson Oblast	Avanhard Kherson	Spartak Kherson
1 (1)	Lviv Oblast	Avanhard Lviv	SKA Lviv
1 (0)	Ternopil Oblast	Avanhard Ternopil	–
1 (0)	(Soviet Union) Drohobych Oblast	Naftovyk Drohobych	–
