= 1957 Soviet Amateur Cup =

Tournament details
- Country: Soviet Union
- Teams: 17

Final positions
- Champions: TTU Tbilisi
- Runners-up: GOMZ Leningrad

The 1957 Soviet Amateur Cup was the inaugural annual season of the Soviet Union's football knockout competition for amateur football teams.

== Participated clubs ==
- Azerbaijan SSR (1): Mekhsul Tauz
- Armenian SSR (1): SKIF Yerevan
- Belarusian SSR (1): Energiya Minsk
- Estonian SSR (1): Spartak Viljandi
- Georgian SSR (1): TTU Tbilisi
- Kazakh SSR (1): Spartak Alma-Ata
- Kyrgyz SSR (1): Profsoyuzy Frunze
- Latvian SSR (1): Dinamo Riga
- Lithuanian SSR (1): Elnias Siauliai
- Moldavian SSR (1): KSKhI Kishinev
- Russian SFSR (3): Spartak Moscow (Moscow), GOMZ Leningrad (Leningrad), Metallurg Stalingrad
- Tajik SSR (1): Metallurg Leninabad
- Turkmen SSR (1): Krasnyi metallist Ashkhabad
- Uzbek SSR (1): Khimik Chirchik
- Ukrainian SSR (1): SKVO Odessa

== Competition schedule ==
=== Qualification round ===
Team 1	Score	Team 2
Spartak Moscow	0–1	Energiya Minsk

=== Round of 16 ===
Team 1	Score	Team 2
Mekhsul Tauz	+/-	Dinamo Riga
Krasnyi metallist Ashkhabad	1–7	SKIF Yerevan
TTU Tbilisi	8–0	Energiya Minsk
Spartak Alma-Ata	2–0	SKVO Odessa
Profsoyuzy Frunze	+/-	Spartak Viljandi
GOMZ Leningrad	3–2	Elnias Siauliai
Metallurg Stalingrad	6–0	KSKhI Kishinev
Metallurg Leninabad	6–3	Khimik Chirchik

=== Quarterfinals (1/4) ===
Team 1	Score	Team 2
GOMZ Leningrad	5–0	Mekhsul Tauz
SKIF Yerevan	3–0	Profsoyuzy Frunze
TTU Tbilisi	4–2	Metallurg Leninabad
Spartak Alma-Ata	3–2	Metallurg Stalingrad

=== Semifinals (1/2) ===
Team 1	Score	Team 2
TTU Tbilisi	3–1	SKIF Yerevan
GOMZ Leningrad	7–0	Spartak Alma-Ata

=== Final ===
Team 1	Score	Team 2
TTU Tbilisi	1–0	GOMZ Leningrad

Winner of the 1957 Soviet Football Cup among amateur teams
TTU Tbilisi (Georgian SSR); 1st time

== See also ==
- 1957 Soviet Cup
