= 1958 Soviet Cup =

1958 Cup of USSR in Football
Кубок СССР

Tournament details
- Country: Soviet Union
- Dates: June 9 – November 2
- Teams: 16 (final stage); 106 (total)

Final positions
- Champions: Spartak Moscow
- Runners-up: Torpedo Moscow

The 1958 Soviet Cup was an association football cup competition of the Soviet Union.

== Participating teams ==
Enter in First round	Enter in Qualification round		
Class A 12/12 teams	Class B 94/94 teams		
✓ Spartak Moscow; ✓ Dinamo Moscow; ✓ CSK MO Moscow; ✓ Zenit Leningrad; ✓ Lokomotiv Moscow; ✓ Dinamo Kiev; ✓ Torpedo Moscow; ✓ Shakhter Stalino; ✓ Dinamo Tbilisi; ✓ Krylia Sovetov Kuibyshev; ✓ Moldova Kishenev; ✓ Admiralteyets Leningrad	Group I ✓ SKVO Odessa; ✓ Trudovye Rezervy Leningrad; ✓ Avangard Nikolayev; ✓ Traktor Stalingrad; ✓ Torpedo Taganrog; ✓ Torpedo Gorkiy; ✓ Lokomotiv Saratov; ✓ Voronezh; ✓ Dinamo Kirov; ✓ Zenit Izhevsk; ✓ Spartak Kherson; ✓ Trudovye Rezervy Lipetsk; ✓ Zvezda Kirovograd; ✓ Iskra Kazan; ✓ Dinamo Ulyanovsk; ✓ Energiya Volzhskiy	Group II ✓ SKChF Sevastopol; ✓ Metallurg Zaporozhye; ✓ Rostselmash Rostov-na-Donu; ✓ Trud Stalinogorsk; ✓ Tekstilschik Ivanovo; ✓ Trudovye Rezervy Lugansk; ✓ Kolgospnik Poltava; ✓ Khimik Yaroslavl; ✓ Metallurg Dnepropetrovsk; ✓ Znamia Truda Orekhovo-Zuyevo; ✓ Avangard Kharkov; ✓ Raketa Gorkiy; ✓ Kolgospnik Cherkassy; ✓ Khimik Dneprodzerzhinsk; ✓ Avangard Simferopol; ✓ Trudovye Rezervy Kursk	Group III ✓ SKVO Lvov; ✓ Spartak Minsk; ✓ Lokomotiv Vinnitsa; ✓ Spartak Uzhgorod; ✓ Spartak Stanislav; ✓ Trud Glukhovo; ✓ Dinamo Tallinn; ✓ SKVO Kiev; ✓ Urozhai Minsk; ✓ Spartak Vilnius; ✓ Volga Kalinin; ✓ Chernomorets Odessa; ✓ Daugava Riga; ✓ Kolgospnik Rovno; ✓ Baltika Kaliningrad; ✓ LTI Leningrad
✓ Spartak Moscow; ✓ Dinamo Moscow; ✓ CSK MO Moscow; ✓ Zenit Leningrad; ✓ Lokomotiv Moscow; ✓ Dinamo Kiev; ✓ Torpedo Moscow; ✓ Shakhter Stalino; ✓ Dinamo Tbilisi; ✓ Krylia Sovetov Kuibyshev; ✓ Moldova Kishenev; ✓ Admiralteyets Leningrad	Group IV ✓ SKVO Rostov-na-Donu; ✓ Spartak Yerevan; ✓ Kuban Krasnodar; ✓ Lokomotiv Kutaisi; ✓ Burevestnik Tbilisi; ✓ SKVO Tbilisi; ✓ Neftianik Baku; ✓ Terek Grozny; ✓ Lokomotiv Artemovsk; ✓ Shakhter Kadiyevka; ✓ Shakhter Shakhty; ✓ Metallurg Stalingrad; ✓ Spartak Stavropol; ✓ Shirak Leninakan; ✓ Temp Makhachkala; ✓ Trud Astrakhan	Group V ✓ SKVO Sverdlovsk; ✓ Kairat Alma-Ata; ✓ Zvezda Perm; ✓ Pakhtakor Tashkent; ✓ Lokomotiv Chelyabinsk; ✓ Mashinostroitel Sverdlovsk; ✓ Devon Ufa; ✓ Trudovye Rezervy Tashkent; ✓ Kolkhozchi Ashkhabad; ✓ Metallurg Magnitogorsk; ✓ Spartak Frunze; ✓ Pamir Leninabad; ✓ Shakhter Karaganda; ✓ Khimik Berezniki; ✓ Metallurg Nizhniy Tagil; ✓ Khosilot Stalinabad	Group 6 ✓ SKVO Khabarovsk; ✓ Tomich Tomsk; ✓ Urozhai Barnaul; ✓ Sibselmash Novosibirsk; ✓ Luch Vladivostok; ✓ Energiya Irkutsk; ✓ Khimik Kemerovo; ✓ Lokomotiv Komsomolsk-na-Amure; ✓ Lokomotiv Krasnoyarsk; ✓ Irtysh Omsk; ✓ Metallurg Stalinsk; ✓ SKVO Chita; ✓ Lokomotiv Svobodny; ✓ Lokomotiv Ulan-Ude

Source: []

== Competition schedule ==
=== Preliminary stage ===
==== Group 1 ====
===== First round =====
[Jul 2] 
Avangard Nikolayev            0-2  SPARTAK Kherson 
  [Kushnaryov 50, Shiman ?] 
Energiya Volzhskiy            0-2  DINAMO Kirov 
  [Katkov, Nazarov] 
ISKRA Kazan                   3-1  Krylya Sovetov Voronezh 
  [Surkov, Ignatov, Berezin – Chernyshov] 
TORPEDO Taganrog              3-1  SKVO Odessa 
  [Vladimir Kutushov 16, V.Nechayev 43, Y.Shikunov ? – V.Moskalenko ?] 
ZENIT Izhevsk                 4-1  Lokomotiv Saratov 
  [Aleksyutin-2, Yanbukhshin-2 - ?] 
[Jul 3] 
ZVEZDA Kirovograd             4-0  Torpedo Gorkiy 
  [B.Petrov-2, Viktor Tretyakov, V.Filin] 
[Jul 4] 
Traktor Stalingrad            2-3  DINAMO Ulyanovsk 
  [A.Ionov-2 – Abramov-2, M.Medvedev] 
Trudoviye Rezervy Lipetsk     1-1  Trudoviye Rezervy Leningrad  
  [Bulkin – Aksyonov]

====== First round replays ======
[Jul 5] 
Trudoviye Rezervy Lipetsk     1-3  TRUDOVIYE REZERVY Leningrad   
  [Fateyev – Kolobov-2, Tagi-zade]

===== Quarterfinals =====
[Jul 6] 
DINAMO Kirov                  3-1  Iskra Kazan 
  [Kuzmin, Biryukov, Ilyin – Markov] 
Spartak Kherson               0-2  ZVEZDA Kirovograd 
  [Filin, Petrov] 
[Jul 8] 
TORPEDO Taganrog              4-1  Trudoviye Rezervy Leningrad   [in Lipetsk] 
  [Levchenko-2, Shikunov, Varnakov (TR) og – Aksyonov] 
ZENIT Izhevsk                 6-3  Dinamo Ulyanovsk 
  [Yanbukhshin-3, Aleksyutin, Mokiyenko, Gubernskiy – Mishin, Abramov, M.Medvedev]

===== Semifinals =====
[Jul 13] 
TORPEDO Taganrog              2-0  Zvezda Kirovograd 
  [Nechayev-2] 
ZENIT Izhevsk                 1-0  Dinamo Kirov 
  [Arutyunyan]

===== Final =====
[Jul 22] 
TORPEDO Taganrog              2-1  Zenit Izhevsk 
  [Levchenko, Saikadze – Gordeyev]

==== Group 2 ====
===== First round =====
[Jul 1] 
METALLURG Zaporozhye          2-0  Avangard Simferopol 
  [Terentyev, Lengevich]  
ZNAMYA TRUDA Orekhovo-Zuyevo  1-0  Khimik Yaroslavl 
  [Petrov] 
[Jul 2] 
Avangard Kharkov              2-3  SKCF Sevastopol 
  [Nesterov, Ilyin – Vasilyev-2, Smirnov] 
KOLHOSPNIK Poltava            8-1  RostSelMash Rostov-na-Donu 
  [Kazankin-2, O.Shchupakov-2, Pelcharskiy-2, Pazho, Brenyo – Matveyev] 
RAKETA Gorkiy                 3-1  Textilshchik Ivanovo 
  [Knyazev, Lesnukhin, Perekatov (T) og – Rubilov] 
TRUDOVIYE REZERVY Lugansk     6-2  Trudoviye Rezervy Kursk 
  [Gureyev-2, Pelishko-2, Glukharyov, Belkov – Kiriyenko, Kovtunenko] 
[Jul 4] 
Khimik Dneprodzerzhinsk       1-2  KOLHOSPNIK Cherkassy 
  [Shiklo – Mitin-2 pen] 
METALLURG Dnepropetrovsk      2-1  Trud Stalinogorsk 
  [Y.Balykin, Y.Prokhorov – Y.Orlov]

===== Quarterfinals =====
[Jul 6] 
ZNAMYA TRUDA Orekhovo-Zuyevo  3-0  SKCF Sevastopol 
  [Loginov-2, Kotychenko] 
[Jul 8] 
KOLHOSPNIK Cherkassy          2-1  Raketa Gorkiy 
  [B.Sokolov, M.Vulfovich – Sysalov] 
[Jul 9] 
Kolhospnik Poltava            1-1  Metallurg Dnepropetrovsk 
  [O.Shchupakov – V.Lapshin] 
METALLURG Zaporozhye          3-2  Trudoviye Rezervy Lugansk 
  [Kovalenko-2, Sverdlov – Belkov, Timoshchenko]

====== Quarterfinals replays ======
[Jul 10] 
Kolhospnik Poltava            1-3  METALLURG Dnepropetrovsk    [aet] 
  [O.Shchupakov ? – M.Didevich 86, V.Lapshin 107, 119]

===== Semifinals =====
[Jul 14] 
METALLURG Dnepropetrovsk      1-0  Kolhospnik Cherkassy        [aet] 
  [V.Lapshin] 
ZNAMYA TRUDA Orekhovo-Zuyevo  4-1  Metallurg Zaporozhye 
  [Lampasov-2, Chavkin, Kotychenko – Serebryanikov]

===== Final =====
[Jul 20] 
ZNAMYA TRUDA Orekhovo-Zuyevo  2-0  Metallurg Dnepropetrovsk 
  [S.Loginov, A.Lampasov]

==== Group 3 ====
===== First round =====
[Jun 9] 
DAUGAVA Riga                  3-1  Spartak Uzhgorod 
  [Ulmanis-2, Nikiforov – S.Sabo] 
[Jun 30] 
SPARTAK Vilnius               1-0  Spartak Minsk 
  [J.Maculis] 
[Jul 2] 
CHERNOMORETS Odessa           2-1  Urozhai Minsk 
  [M.Tserekov, V.Shchegolkov pen – V.Korotkevich] 
KOLHOSPNIK Rovno              2-1  LTI Leningrad 
  [Y.Ivanov, Shmorgun – Alyukhin]  
SKVO Lvov                     5-2  Volga Kalinin 
  [Kopayev-2, Breyev pen, Churikov, Filyayev – Velkin-2] 
SPARTAK Stanislav             w/o  Dinamo Tallinn 
TRUD Glukhovo                 2-1  Baltika Kaliningrad 
[Jul 5] 
LOKOMOTIV Vinnitsa            3-1  SKVO Kiev 
  [Anatoliy Aleksandrov, Mikhail Petrov, Anatoliy Konovalov – Putevskoi]

===== Quarterfinals =====
[Jul 6] 
KOLHOSPNIK Rovno              2-1  Chernomorets Odessa 
  [M.Tyagai 37, K.Marichev 39 – V.Solovyov ?] 
[Jul 9] 
LOKOMOTIV Vinnitsa            2-1  Trud Glukhovo 
  [?, Troyanovskiy – Shishkov] 
SKVO Lvov                     5-3  Spartak Stanislav           [aet] 
  [Kessler-2, Galbmillion, Kopayev, Filyayev – Y.Dumanskiy, Y.Golovei, Chepiga] 
[Jul 11] 
DAUGAVA Riga                  w/o  Spartak Vilnius

===== Semifinals =====
[Jul 15] 
LOKOMOTIV Vinnitsa            4-2  Daugava Riga 
  [Konovalov-2, Soiko, Troyanovskiy – Ulmanis, Smirnov] 
SKVO Lvov                     4-0  Kolhospnik Rovno 
  [Breyev pen, O.Morozov, Kessler, Filyayev]

===== Final =====
[Jul 20] 
Lokomotiv Vinnitsa            0-1  SKVO Lvov 
  [Shishayev]

==== Group 4 ====
===== First round =====
[Jun 29] 
LOKOMOTIV Artyomovsk          2-1  Shakhtyor Shakhty 
  [Zinchenko, Kalinin – Bykov (L) og] 
[Jul 2] 
LOKOMOTIV Kutaisi             1-0  Metallurg Stalingrad 
  [Sordia] 
[Jul 6] 
Shakhtyor Kadiyevka           1-2  SKVO Rostov-na-Donu 
  [Samsonov – Volchenkov, Mosalyov] 
Shirak Leninakan              0-1  BUREVESTNIK Tbilisi 
  [Mumladze] 
TEMP Makhachkala              1-0  Spartak Yerevan 
  [Abdullayev] 
[Jul 8] 
SKVO Tbilisi                  5-3  Spartak Stavropol 
  [Goreshnev-3, Mikadze, Norakidze – Rybakov, Knyazev, Belyayev] 
[Jul 10] 
Neftyanik Baku                1-2  KUBAN Krasnodar             [aet] 
  [Javakhyan – Mangasarov, Zibrov] 
Trud Astrakhan                0-2  TEREK Grozny  
  [Kachanov, Pismenny]

===== Quarterfinals =====
[Jul 7] 
LOKOMOTIV Kutaisi             2-1  Lokomotiv Artyomovsk  
  [Kokhiani, Sordia – Ziroyan] 
[Jul 13] 
SKVO Rostov-na-Donu           2-1  Temp Makhachkala 
  [Streshniy, Gushchin – Dubovitskiy] 
[Jul 14] 
BUREVESTNIK Tbilisi           2-1  Kuban Krasnodar 
  [Sichinava, Urtkmelidze – Samsonov] 
TEREK Grozny                  4-3  SKVO Tbilisi 
  [Danilov-2, Pismenny, Abramov – Miroshnikov, Norakidze, Kvlividze]

===== Semifinals =====
[Jul 18] 
SKVO Rostov-na-Donu           2-0  Burevestnik Tbilisi 
  [Yegorov, Volchenkov] 
TEREK Grozny                  2-0  Lokomotiv Kutaisi 
  [Kh.Danilov, Serednyakov]

===== Final =====
[Jul 22] 
SKVO Rostov-na-Donu           3-0  Terek Grozny 
  [Telenkov, Yegorov, Shvets]

==== Group 5 ====
===== First round =====
[Jul 7] 
METALLURG Magnitogorsk        3-1  Metallurg Nizhniy Tagil 
  [Slyunchenko, Melkonyan, Shchetinin – Balakirev] 
[Jul 22] 
Khimik Berezniki              2-6  SKVO Sverdlovsk 
  [Klimov, Gordeyev – Vozzhayev-4, Snegiryov, Potaskuyev] 
LOKOMOTIV Chelyabinsk         3-1  Devon Ufa 
  [Nechayev, Mikhin, Frolov – Zapakhalov] 
PAHTAKOR Tashkent             3-0  Hosilot Stalinabad 
  [Krasnitskiy-2, Sheffer] 
Pamir Leninabad               0-1  KOLHOZCHI Ashkhabad 
  [Polyakov] 
SHAKHTYOR Karaganda           2-0  Trudoviye Rezervy Tashkent 
  [V.Kamyshev, V.Ledovskikh] 
SPARTAK Frunze                2-1  Kayrat Alma-Ata 
  [Churikov-2 – Ostroushko] 
[Jul 23] 
Zvezda Perm                   1-2  MASHINOSTROITEL Sverdlovsk 
  [B.Petrov 39 – A.Zaitsevskiy 60, S.Gavrilov 77]

===== Quarterfinals =====
[Jul 26] 
Lokomotiv Chelyabinsk         2-2  SKVO Sverdlovsk 
  [Mikhin, Kozhukhov – Skulkin, Brovkin]  
[Jul 27] 
Metallurg Magnitogorsk        0-2  MASHINOSTROITEL Sverdlovsk 
  [A.Zaitsevskiy, Y.Lundin]  
PAHTAKOR Tashkent             3-0  Kolhozchi Ashkhabad 
  [Borkin, Tazetdinov, Motorin] 
SPARTAK Frunze                2-1  Shakhtyor Karaganda 
  [Musayev, Poyarkov – Chuvakov]

====== Quarterfinals replays ======
[Jul 27] 
Lokomotiv Chelyabinsk         3-5  SKVO Sverdlovsk             [aet] 
  [Tufatullin, Mikhin, Smirnov – Neverov-2, Potaskuyev, Gladkikh, Snegiryov]

===== Semifinals =====
[Aug 2] 
MASHINOSTROITEL Sverdlovsk    2-0  SKVO Sverdlovsk 
  [S.Gavrilov-2] 
[Aug 6] 
Spartak Frunze                0-1  PAHTAKOR Tashkent 
  [Varennik]

===== Final =====
[Aug 20] 
PAHTAKOR Tashkent             2-2  Mashinostroitel Sverdlovsk 
  [Maksudov, Motorin – Y.Brovkin, Y.Lundin] 
NB: Abandoned at 86’, when Mashinostroitel had 7 players left. 
    Awarded to Pahtakor.

==== Group 6 ====
===== First round =====
[Jul 2] 
Luch Vladivostok              w/o  LOKOMOTIV Komsomolsk-na-Amure  
NB: Originally 2-0 [Benedikt-2], but the result was annulled and 
    the match awarded to Lokomotiv. 
[Jul 6] 
ENERGIYA Irkutsk              2-1  SKVO Chita 
  [Kulakov, Zubkov – Titov] 
Khimik Kemerovo               1-2  TOMICH Tomsk                [aet] 
  [Mokhov (T) og – Tarakanov, A.Chentsov] 
SibSelMash Novosibirsk        2-4  LOKOMOTIV Krasnoyarsk 
  [Kovshov-2 – Parchenko-2, Gorshkov-2] 
SKVO Khabarovsk               2-0  Lokomotiv Svobodny 
  [I.Grek, V.Borodin] 
UROZHAI Barnaul               w/o  Lokomotiv Ulan-Ude

===== Quarterfinals =====
[Jul 10] 
Irtysh Omsk                   1-1  Lokomotiv Krasnoyarsk 
  [Kostyakov – Parchenko] 
Lokomotiv Komsomolsk-na-Amure 0-1  SKVO Khabarovsk  
  [I.Grek 87]  
Tomich Tomsk                  0-1  ENERGIYA Irkutsk  
  [Kirov]  
UROZHAI Barnaul               6-1  Metallurg Stalinsk 
  [Fedulov-3, Krushnyakov-2, Reshitko - ?]

====== Quarterfinals replays ======
[Jul 11] 
Irtysh Omsk                   1-2  LOKOMOTIV Krasnoyarsk 
  [M.Kostyakov – Gorshkov-2]

===== Semifinals =====
[Jul 15] 
ENERGIYA Irkutsk              2-1  Urozhai Barnaul             [aet] 
  [Galeto, Zubkov – Krushnyakov] 
LOKOMOTIV Krasnoyarsk         3-1  SKVO Khabarovsk 
  [Gorshkov-2, Parchenko – A.Frolov]

===== Final =====
[Jul 20] 
LOKOMOTIV Krasnoyarsk         4-2  Energiya Irkutsk 
  [Khromenkov-2, Gorshkov, Nikishin – Sadovy, Zubkov]

==== Group Winners’ Play-off ====
[Jul 30] 
ZNAMYA TRUDA Orekhovo-Zuyevo  1-0  Torpedo Taganrog            [aet] 
  [Sharashkin] 
[Aug 16] 
SKVO Lvov                     4-3  SKVO Rostov-na-Donu         [aet] 
  [Kopayev-2, Kurchavenkov, O.Morozov – Volchenkov, Streshniy, Mosalyov]

=== Final stage ===
==== First round ====
[Aug 25] 
LOKOMOTIV Krasnoyarsk         3-0  Zenit Leningrad 
  [V.Lesnyak 7, V.Nikishin 63, A.Parchenko 73] 
[Oct 2] 
PAHTAKOR Tashkent             2-1  SKVO Lvov 
  [Vlasov, Motorin – O.Morozov] 
[Oct 5] 
ZNAMYA TRUDA Orekhovo-Zuyevo  2-1  Moldova Kishinev 
  [Lampasov, Korolkov – Mikhail Mukhortov] 
[Oct 6] 
Dinamo Kiev                   0-4  SPARTAK Moskva 
  [Anatoliy M.Ilyin 17, Anatoliy Isayev 32, Nikita Simonyan 34, Igor Netto 85] 
[Oct 7] 
ADMIRALTEYETS Leningrad       3-1  Dinamo Tbilisi 
  [Yuriy Varlamov-2, Yuriy Morozov – Vladimir Barkaia] 
DINAMO Moskva                 2-1  CSK MO Moskva 
  [Genrikh Fedosov 54, 57 – Ivan Duda 56] 
Shakhtyor Stalino             1-2  TORPEDO Moskva 
  [Ivan Fedosov 27 – Slava Metreveli 53, Gennadiy Gusarov 66] 
[Oct 8] 
Krylya Sovetov Kuibyshev      0-2  LOKOMOTIV Moskva 
  [Viktor Voroshilov 81, Viktor Sokolov 85]

==== Quarterfinals ====
[Oct 10] 
SPARTAK Moskva                4-1  Lokomotiv Krasnoyarsk 
  [Y.Svishchov (L) 10 og, Sergei Salnikov 22 pen, 58, A.Steblitskiy (L) 42 og – A.Parchenko 50] 
[Oct 11] 
Admiralteyets Leningrad       1-6  TORPEDO Moskva 
  [Yuriy Varlamov 4 – Yuriy Falin 5, ?, Gennadiy Gusarov 59, ?, ?, Valentin Ivanov ?] 
LOKOMOTIV Moskva              2-1  Znamya Truda Orekhovo-Zuyevo 
  [Viktor Orekhov 14, Igor Zaitsev 29 – Korolkov 77] 
Pahtakor Tashkent             0-2  DINAMO Moskva 
  [Viktor Tsaryov 16, Alexandr Sokolov 55]

==== Semifinals ====
[Oct 10] 
SPARTAK Moskva                2-1  Dinamo Moskva                 
  [Anatoliy M.Ilyin 16, Anatoliy Isayev 64 – Valeriy Urin 83] 
[Oct 27] 
TORPEDO Moskva                2-1  Lokomotiv Moskva            [aet] 
  [Yuriy Falin ?, Slava Metreveli 118 – Zaur Kaloyev 16]

==== Final ====
2 November 1958

Spartak Moscow	1 – 0 (a.e.t.)	Torpedo Moscow
Simonyan 98'	[ Report]

Moscow
