= 1991 Soviet Amateur Cup =

Tournament details
- Country: Soviet Union

Final positions
- Champions: Metallurg Molodechno
- Runners-up: Pambygchi Barda

The 1991 Soviet Amateur Cup was the last annual season of football knockout competition in the Soviet Union for amateur football teams (collective of physical culture).

== Competition schedule ==
=== First qualification round ===
Team 1	Agg.	Team 2	1st leg	2nd leg
Smena Leningrad	1–12	Metallurg Molodechno	1–7	0–5
Kristalul Faleshty	5–2	Gaya Valmiyera	5–0	0–2
Spartak Arkhangelsk	2–2 (a)	Petrovtsy	2–1	0–1
Trans Narva	w/o	Mashinostroitel Bolokhovo	1–3	-/+
Orbita Zaporozhye	2–3	Avangard Lozovaya	0–2	2–1
Mosenergo Moscow	4–2	Kopetdag Ashkhabat	4–0	0–2
Start Tashkent	w/o	Azeri Baku	1–2	-/+
Metallurg Aldan	8–1	Santekhnik Irkutsk	5–0	3–1
Avtomobilist Kurgan-Tyube	2–4	Pambygchi Barda	1–0	1–4
Selmashevets Frunze	7–3	Alyuminschik Pavlodar	4–1	3–2
Fosforit Zhanatas	3–3 (a)	Tsementchi Bekabad	3–1	0–2
Spartak Kostroma (klubnaya)	w/o	Moldavgidromash Kishinev	0–1	-/+
Torpedo Arzamas	w/o	Gornyak Khartsyzk	–	–
Karbyshevets Kurgan	w/o	Sudostroitel Astrakhan	–	–
Inshaatchi Baku	w/o	Meliorator Dzhambul	–	–
SKB Vitebsk	DNP	Lori Kirovakan	–	–

=== Second qualification round ===
Team 1	Agg.	Team 2	1st leg	2nd leg
Metallurg Molodechno	4–2	Kristalul Faleshty	3–0	1–2
Petrovtsy	1–5	Torpedo Arzamas	1–1	0–4
Mashinostroitel Bolokhovo	4–5	Avangard Lozovaya	4–0	1–4
Mosenergo Moscow	8–0	Karbyshevets Kurgan	5–0	3–0
Inshaatchi Baku	1–2	Azeri Baku	1–0	0–2
Metallurg Aldan	2–3	Pambygchi Barda	2–0	0–3
Selmashevets Frunze	2–0	Tsementchi Bekabad	2–0	0–0
Moldavgidromash Kishinev	bye	–	–	–

=== Quarterfinals (1/4) ===
Team 1	Agg.	Team 2	1st leg	2nd leg
Metallurg Molodechno	4–4 (a)	Torpedo Arzamas	2–0	2–4
Moldavgidromash Kishinev	2–5	Avangard Lozovaya	2–3	0–2
Mosenergo Moscow	4–6	Azeri Baku	3–0	1–6
Pambygchi Barda	6–4	Tsementchi Bekabad	5–0	1–4

=== Semifinals (1/2) ===
Team 1	Agg.	Team 2	1st leg	2nd leg
Metallurg Molodechno	4–1	Avangard Lozovaya	3–0	1–1
Azeri Baku	w/o	Pambygchi Barda	1–1	-/+

=== Final ===
Team 1	Score	Team 2
Pambygchi Barda	1–2	Metallurg Molodechno

== See also ==
- 1991–92 Soviet Cup
- 1990–91 Soviet Cup
