= 1959–60 Soviet Cup =

1959–60 Cup of USSR in Football
Кубок СССР

Tournament details
- Country: Soviet Union
- Dates: 11 June 1959 – 31 October 1960
- Teams: 32 (final stage); 113 (total)

Final positions
- Champions: Torpedo Moscow
- Runners-up: Dinamo Tbilisi

The 1959–60 Soviet Cup was an association football cup competition of the Soviet Union.

The competition has stretched for two whole seasons. Started in June of 1959, it was interrupted in early November of 1959 at Round of 16 with most matches completed. It then resumed in 1960 only in late August.

== Participating teams ==
Enter in First round	Enter in Qualification round		
Class A 12/12 teams	Class B 101/101 teams		
✓ Dinamo Moscow; ✓ Lokomotiv Moscow; ✓ Dinamo Tbilisi; ✓ SKVO Rostov-na-Donu; ✓ Torpedo Moscow; ✓ Spartak Moscow; ✓ Dinamo Kiev; ✓ Zenit Leningrad; ✓ CSK MO Moscow; ✓ Moldova Kishenev; ✓ Krylia Sovetov Kuibyshev; ✓ Shakhter Stalino	Group I ✓ Trud Voronezh; ✓ Dinamo Kirov; ✓ Avangard Nikolayev; ✓ Metallurg Dnepropetrovsk; ✓ Iskra Kazan; ✓ Metallurg Zaporozhye; ✓ Khimik Yaroslavl; ✓ Lokomotiv Saratov; ✓ Spartak Leningrad; ✓ Spartak Kherson; ✓ Khimik Dneprodzerzhinsk; ✓ Trudovye Rezervy Lipetsk; ✓ Trud Vladimir; ✓ Trud Ryazan; ✓ Lokomotiv Bendery	Group II ✓ Trudovye Rezervy Leningrad; ✓ Trud Glukhovo; ✓ Avangard Kharkov; ✓ Kolgospnik Cherkassy; ✓ Arsenal Kiev; ✓ Zvezda Kirovograd; ✓ Spartak Minsk; ✓ Shakhter Stalinogorsk; ✓ Avangard Zhitomir; ✓ Znamia Truda Orekhovo-Zuyevo; ✓ Trudovye Rezervy Kursk; ✓ Krivoi Rog; ✓ Trud Tula; ✓ Kolgospnik Poltava; ✓ Lokomotiv Gomel	Group III ✓ Spartak Yerevan; ✓ Terek Grozny; ✓ Torpedo Taganrog; ✓ Shirak Leninakan; ✓ Kuban Krasnodar; ✓ Torpedo Kutaisi; ✓ SKVO Tbilisi; ✓ Rostselmash Rostov-na-Donu; ✓ Spartak Stavropol; ✓ Spartak Nalchik; ✓ Lokomotiv Tbilisi; ✓ Neftianik Baku; ✓ Temp Makhachkala; ✓ Tekstilschik Kirovabad
✓ Dinamo Moscow; ✓ Lokomotiv Moscow; ✓ Dinamo Tbilisi; ✓ SKVO Rostov-na-Donu; ✓ Torpedo Moscow; ✓ Spartak Moscow; ✓ Dinamo Kiev; ✓ Zenit Leningrad; ✓ CSK MO Moscow; ✓ Moldova Kishenev; ✓ Krylia Sovetov Kuibyshev; ✓ Shakhter Stalino	Group IV ✓ Lokomotiv Vinnitsa; ✓ Baltika Kaliningrad; ✓ SKVO Odessa; ✓ Chernomorets Odessa; ✓ Spartak Vilnius; ✓ SKVO Lvov; ✓ Spartak Uzhgorod; ✓ Dinamo Tallinn; ✓ Kolgospnik Rovno; ✓ SKChF Sevastopol; ✓ Daugava Riga; ✓ Avangard Simferopol; ✓ Urozhai Minsk; ✓ Spartak Stanislav; ✓ Avangard Ternopol	Group V ✓ Admiraleyets Leningrad; ✓ Volga Kalinin; ✓ Zenit Izhevsk; ✓ Trudovye Rezervy Lugansk; ✓ Lokomotiv Stalino; ✓ Shakhter Kadiyevka; ✓ Traktor Stalingrad; ✓ Torpedo Gorkiy; ✓ Gorkiy; ✓ Spartak Ulyanovsk; ✓ Tekstilschik Ivanovo; ✓ Shakhter Gorlovka; ✓ Energiya Volzhskiy; ✓ Shakhter Shakhty	Group VI ✓ Pamir Leninabad; ✓ Mashinostroitel Sverdlovsk; ✓ Metallurg Magnitogorsk; ✓ Pakhtakor Tashkent; ✓ Zvezda Perm; ✓ Kairat Alma-Ata; ✓ Trudovye Rezervy Tashkent; ✓ Spartak Frunze; ✓ Metallurg Nizhniy Tagil; ✓ Lokomotiv Chelyabinsk; ✓ Shakhter Karaganda; ✓ Kolkhozchi Ashkhabad; ✓ Stroitel Ufa; ✓ Khosilot Stalinabad
✓ Dinamo Moscow; ✓ Lokomotiv Moscow; ✓ Dinamo Tbilisi; ✓ SKVO Rostov-na-Donu; ✓ Torpedo Moscow; ✓ Spartak Moscow; ✓ Dinamo Kiev; ✓ Zenit Leningrad; ✓ CSK MO Moscow; ✓ Moldova Kishenev; ✓ Krylia Sovetov Kuibyshev; ✓ Shakhter Stalino	Group VII ✓ SKVO Sverdlovsk; ✓ Lokomotiv Krasnoyarsk; ✓ SKVO Khabarovsk; ✓ Khimik Kemerovo; ✓ Sibselmash Novosibirsk; ✓ Irtysh Omsk; ✓ Metallurg Stalinsk; ✓ Urozhai Barnaul; ✓ Sibelektromotor Tomsk; ✓ Lokomotiv Komsomolsk-na-Amure; ✓ Energiya Irkutsk; ✓ SKVO Chita; ✓ Lokomotiv Ulan-Ude; ✓ Luch Vladivostok		

Source: []

== Competition schedule ==
=== Preliminary stage ===
==== Group 1 ====
===== Quarterfinals =====
[Jul 8] 
KHIMIK Yaroslavl              4-1  Iskra Kazan 
Metallurg Dnepropetrovsk      1-2  LOKOMOTIV Saratov 
TRUD Ryazan                   4-1  Metallurg Zaporozhye        [aet]

===== Semifinals =====
[Jul 3] 
Trud Voronezh                 1-2  SPARTAK Leningrad   
TRUDOVIYE REZERVY Lipetsk     3-0  Avangard Nikolayev 
[Jul 7] 
DINAMO Kirov                 10-3  Lokomotiv Bendery 
[Jul 11] 
Trud Ryazan                   1-1  Khimik Dneprodzerzhinsk  
[Jul 14] 
SPARTAK Kherson               2-1  Khimik Yaroslavl            [aet] 
TORPEDO Vladimir              4-3  Lokomotiv Saratov           [aet]

====== Semifinals replays ======
[Jul 12] 
TRUD Ryazan                   1-0  Khimik Dneprodzerzhinsk

===== Final =====
[Jul 19] 
SPARTAK Kherson               1-0  Spartak Leningrad 
TORPEDO Vladimir              2-1  Trudoviye Rezervy Lipetsk 
Trud Ryazan                   0-1  DINAMO Kirov

==== Group 2 ====
===== Quarterfinals =====
[Jul 4] 
ARSENAL Kiev                  w/o  Spartak Minsk 
Trudoviye Rezervy Kursk       0-6  KOLHOSPNIK Poltava 
[Jul 5] 
Shakhtyor Stalinogorsk        1-2  TRUD Glukhovo

===== Semifinals =====
[Jul 7] 
AVANGARD Kharkov              5-4  Kolhospnik Poltava          [aet] 
AVANGARD Zhitomir             3-1  Avangard Krivoi Rog 
ZNAMYA TRUDA Orekhovo-Zuyevo  3-0  Lokomotiv Gomel 
[Jul 10] 
Kolhospnik Cherkassy          0-2  TRUD Glukhovo  
TRUDOVIYE REZERVY Leningrad   w/o  Zvezda Kirovograd 
[Aug 6] 
ARSENAL Kiev                  2-0  Trud Tula

===== Final =====
[Aug 12] 
ARSENAL Kiev                  2-0  Avangard Zhitomir 
TRUD Glukhovo                 5-3  Znamya Truda Orekhovo-Zuyevo  [aet] 
[Aug 19] 
AVANGARD Kharkov              3-1  Trudoviye Rezervy Leningrad

==== Group 3 ====
===== Quarterfinals =====
[Jun 23] 
KUBAN Krasnodar               4-1  Torpedo Taganrog 
Spartak Nalchik               1-1  Torpedo Kutaisi

====== Quarterfinals replays ======
[Jun 24] 
SPARTAK Nalchik               5-2  Torpedo Kutaisi

===== Semifinals =====
[Jun 23] 
SPARTAK Stavropol             3-1  Lokomotiv Tbilisi 
[Jun 26] 
ROSTSELMASH Rostov-na-Donu    4-0  Temp Makhachkala 
NEFTYANIK Baku                3-1  Terek Grozny 
SHIRAK Leninakan              6-0  Textilshchik Kirovabad 
SKVO Tbilisi                  3-1  Kuban Krasnodar 
Spartak Nalchik               1-2  SPARTAK Yerevan

===== Final =====
[Jul 4] 
Spartak Stavropol             1-2  NEFTYANIK Baku                [aet] 
[Jul 10] 
SHIRAK Leninakan              2-0  Spartak Yerevan 
SKVO Tbilisi                  7-2  RostSelMash Rostov-na-Donu

==== Group 4 ====
===== Quarterfinals =====
[Jul 3] 
DINAMO Tallinn                4-0  Urozhai Minsk 
Kolhospnik Rovno              2-3  SKVO Odessa  
SKCF Sevastopol               3-1  Avangard Ternopol

===== Semifinals =====
[Jul 13] 
Daugava Riga                  1-2  SKVO Odessa                 [aet] 
[Jul 14] 
Avangard Simferopol           0-3  SPARTAK Stanislav 
LOKOMOTIV Vinnitsa            3-0  SKCF Sevastopol 
SKVO Lvov                     2-1  Dinamo Tallinn 
SPARTAK Vilnius               2-1  Chernomorets Odessa 
[Aug 3] 
Baltika Kaliningrad           0-1  SPARTAK Uzhgorod

===== Final =====
[Jul 24] 
SKVO Lvov                     0-1  SPARTAK Vilnius 
SKVO Odessa                   6-0  Spartak Stanislav 
[Aug 24] 
LOKOMOTIV Vinnitsa            7-1  Spartak Uzhgorod

==== Group 5 ====
===== Quarterfinals =====
ADMIRALTEYETS Leningrad       3-2  Volga Kalinin 
SPARTAK Ulyanovsk             3-2  Shakhtyor Gorlovka

===== Semifinals =====
ADMIRALTEYETS Leningrad       4-2  Shakhtyor Kadiyevka 
ENERGIYA Volzhskiy            4-1  Zenit Izhevsk 
Lokomotiv Stalino             3-4  TRAKTOR Stalingrad 
SHAKHTYOR Shakhty             3-0  Raketa Gorkiy 
SPARTAK Ulyanovsk             3-1  Trudoviye Rezervy Lugansk 
TEXTILSHCHIK Ivanovo          3-2  Torpedo Gorkiy

===== Final =====
ADMIRALTEYETS Leningrad 4-0 Textilshchik Ivanovo SHAKHTYOR Shakhty 3-0 Energiya Volzhskiy TRAKTOR Stalingrad 4-1 Spartak Ulyanovsk

==== Group 6 ====
===== Quarterfinals =====
HOSILOT Stalinabad            2-1  Spartak Frunze 
KAYRAT Alma-Ata               1-0  Metallurg Magnitogorsk 
LOKOMOTIV Chelyabinsk         w/o  Trudoviye Rezervy Tashkent 
Metallurg Nizhniy Tagil       0-1  MASHINOSTROITEL Sverdlovsk 
STROITEL Ufa                  w/o  Pahtakor Tashkent 
ZVEZDA Perm                   5-1  Shakhtyor Karaganda

===== Semifinals =====
[Jul 9] 
KAYRAT Alma-Ata               w/o  Hosilot Stalinabad 
PAMIR Leninabad               w/o  Mashinostroitel Sverdlovsk 
STROITEL Ufa                  4-1  Kolhozchi Ashkhabad 
ZVEZDA Perm                   2-0  Lokomotiv Chelyabinsk

===== Final =====
[Jul 19] 
Kayrat Alma-Ata               1-2  STROITEL Ufa 
ZVEZDA Perm                   2-1  Pamir Leninabad

==== Group 7 ====
===== Quarterfinals =====
[May 20] 
Metallurg Stalinsk            1-3  SKVO Chita 
[Jul 9] 
SIBSELMASH Novosibirsk        w/o  SKVO Sverdlovsk

===== Semifinals =====
[Jun 13] 
UROZHAI Barnaul               w/o  Lokomotiv Ulan-Ude 
SKVO Chita                    2-2  Luch Vladivostok  
[Jun 25] 
SKVO Khabarovsk               0-1  ENERGIYA Irkutsk 
[Jul 7] 
Khimik Kemerovo               1-4  LOKOMOTIV Krasnoyarsk  
SIBELECTROMOTOR Tomsk         4-1  Irtysh Omsk 
[Jul 15] 
LOKOMOTIV Komsomolsk-na-Amure 1-0  SibSelMash Novosibirsk

====== Semifinals replays ======
[Jun 14] 
SKVO Chita                    1-3  LUCH Vladivostok

===== Final =====
[Jul 5] 
ENERGIYA Irkutsk              2-0  Luch Vladivostok 
[Jul 21] 
Lokomotiv Komsomolsk-na-Amure 0-1  SIBELECTROMOTOR Tomsk  
Urozhai Barnaul               0-1  LOKOMOTIV Krasnoyarsk         [aet]

=== Final stage ===
==== First round ====
[Jul 11] 
Energiya Irkutsk              0-3  SPARTAK Moskva 
  [Yevgeniy Kholmogorov 3, Ivan Mozer 65, Sergei Salnikov 83] 
[Jul 15] 
SHIRAK Leninakan              5-0  Krylya Sovetov Kuibyshev 
[Jul 30] 
Shakhtyor Shakhty             1-4  MOLDOVA Kishinev 
[Aug 2] 
Spartak Kherson               0-2  SHAKHTYOR Stalino 
  [Ivan Boboshko, Ivan Fedosov] 
[Aug 9] 
Trud Glukhovo                 1-1  CSK MO Moskva 
  [Andreyev – Viktor Brovkin] 
[Aug 18] 
SKVO Tbilisi                  2-0  Zenit Leningrad 
  [Mikadze 55, 86] 
[Aug 19] 
Dinamo Kirov                  3-4  DINAMO Tbilisi 
  [V.Yershov-2, V.Ilyin pen – Zaur Kaloyev-2, Toradze, Shota Yamanidze] 
Lokomotiv Vinnitsa            0-3  SKVO Rostov-na-Donu 
  [Vladimir Smirnov 13, 78, Alexei Levchenko 70] 
SIBELECTROMOTOR Tomsk         1-0  Dinamo Kiev 
  [N.Kozlov 38 pen] 
[Aug 25] 
Torpedo Vladimir              1-2  ADMIRALTEYETS Leningrad 
[Aug 26] 
Arsenal Kiev                  0-2  DINAMO Moskva 
  [Genrikh Fedosov 25, 48] 
Lokomotiv Krasnoyarsk         2-4  TORPEDO Moskva 
  [Yuriy Agiyenko 37, 38 – Yuriy Falin 2, ?, Valentin Ivanov 44, ?] 
SPARTAK Vilnius               4-3  Zvezda Perm 
  [Kazlauskas-2, Petkevicius, ? – Beloborodov-2, ?] 
[Sep 22] 
STROITEL Ufa                  4-2  Avangard Kharkov              [aet] 
  [V.Perevoznikov, Y.Yefimov, Y.Artamonov, V.Kuzmin – Y.Panfilov, A.Mashin] 
[Oct 21] 
SKVO Odessa                   3-1  Lokomotiv Moskva 
  [V.Grishin 17, D.Mizerny 88, V.Nazarov 89 – Viktor Sokolov 45] 
[Oct 25] 
TRAKTOR Stalingrad            1-0  Neftyanik Baku

===== First round replays =====
[Aug 10] 
Trud Glukhovo                 1-7  CSK MO Moskva

==== Second round ====
[Aug 17] 
SHIRAK Leninakan              2-1  Moldova Kishinev 
[Sep 30] 
SPARTAK Vilnius               3-1  Admiralteyets Leningrad 
  [Stasis Krocas-2, Stasis Madeikis – Igor Sveshnikov] 
[Oct 4] 
SibElectroMotor Tomsk         1-2  TORPEDO Moskva 
  [A.Chentsov 43 – Slava Metreveli 56, 74] 
[Oct 22] 
TRAKTOR Stalingrad            4-0  Stroitel Ufa 
  [Telenkov-2, V.Kamenev, Butskiy] 
[Nov 5] 
DINAMO Tbilisi                2-1  Spartak Moskva                [aet] 
  [Khochalava 6, Mikhail Meskhi 104 – Sergei Salnikov 9] 
[Sep 14, 1960] 
DINAMO Moskva                 1-0  CSKA Moskva 
  [Arkadiy Nikolayev 58] 
SKA Rostov-na-Donu            0-4  SHAKHTYOR Stalino 
  [Yuriy Ananchenko 21, 36, 38, 63] 
SKA Tbilisi                   -:+  SKA Odessa 
  [SKA Tbilisi had ceased to be]

==== Quarterfinals ====
[Aug 25] 
SKA Odessa                    1-0  Traktor Stalingrad 
  [Yuriy Markin 60 og] 
[Sep 28] 
DINAMO Tbilisi                5-1  Shirak Leninakan 
  [Zaur Kaloyev-4, Shota Yamanidze – Avetisyan] 
Spartak Vilnius               1-2  SHAKHTYOR Stalino 
  [Algirdas Kulikauskas 76 – Valentin Sapronov 11, Anatoliy Mironov 30] 
TORPEDO Moskva                2-0  Dinamo Moskva 
  [Oleg Sergeyev 24, Boris Batanov 64]

==== Semifinals ====
[Oct 26, Moskva] 
Shakhtyor Stalino             1-2  DINAMO Tbilisi                [aet] 
  [Yuriy Ananchenko 108 – Zaur Kaloyev 100, Mikhail Meskhi 120] 
[Oct 27]  
TORPEDO Moskva                4-0  SKA Odessa 
  [Valentin Ivanov-2, Gennadiy Gusarov pen, Slava Metreveli]

==== Final ====
31 October 1960

Torpedo Moscow	4 – 3 (a.e.t.)	Dinamo Tbilisi
Gusarov 10' (pen.), 54'; Ivanov 67', 119'	[ Report]	Barkaia 26'; Kaloyev 58'; Melashvili 87'

Moscow
