= Soviet Amateur Cup =

Football Cup of the Soviet Union for teams of physical culture collectives (Russian: Кубок СССР по футболу среди команд коллективов физической культуры, romanized: Kubok SSR po futbolu spedi komand kollektivov fizichkoy kyl'tur') was an association football competition for amateur teams and physical culture collectives that was held in the Soviet Union from 1957 to 1991 under the auspices of the Football Federation of the Soviet Union. Throughout its history, the tournament was also known as the VTsSPS (Note: All-Union Central Council of Trade Unions) Cup, Soviet Cup among production collectives, and Cup of the millions.

In 1957 in the Soviet football took place another reform, after which physical culture collectives (amateur teams) were restricted from competing in the Soviet Cup and for them was organized a separate tournament. The competition was conducted among the best "collectives of physical culture" that won their respective regional Cup competitions. In 1962–1967 the winner was identified in the final group stage. In 1981–1988 the competition was not conducted.

== List of finals ==
Key
†	Match was won during extra time
*	Match was won on a penalty shoot-out
&	Match was won after a replay

- The "Season" column refers to the season the competition was held, and wikilinks to the article about that season.
- The wikilinks in the "Score" column point to the article about that season's final game.

List of Cup finals
#	Season	Nation	Winners	Score	Runners-up	Nation	Venue	Att.
–	1940	Kazakh SSR	Dinamo Alma-Ata	3–1^{&}	Zenit Taganrog	Russian SFSR	(Russian Soviet Federative Socialist Republic) Dynamo Stadium, Rostov-na-Donu	
1	1957	Georgian SSR	TTU Tbilisi	1–0	GOMZ Leningrad	Russian SFSR	(Russian Soviet Federative Socialist Republic) Central Dynamo Stadium, Moscow	
2	1958	Russian SFSR	Dinamo Moscow 19th raisoviet	5–1^{&}	Trud Ramenskoe	Russian SFSR	(Russian Soviet Federative Socialist Republic) Central Dynamo Stadium, Moscow	
3	1959	Russian SFSR	Spartak Moscow (reserves)	1–0	ZIP-Energiya Krasnodar	Russian SFSR	(Georgian Soviet Socialist Republic) Tbilisi	
4	1960	Russian SFSR	Zhdanovets Leningrad	2–1^{&}	Start Chuguyev	Ukrainian SSR	(Ukrainian Soviet Socialist Republic) Lugansk	
5	1961	Ukrainian SSR	Start Chuguyev	1–0	GOMZ Leningrad	Russian SFSR	(Ukrainian Soviet Socialist Republic) Central ChGMP Stadium, Odessa	
6	1962	Uzbek SSR	Sokol Tashkent	group	Saturn Ramenskoe	Russian SFSR	(Russian Soviet Federative Socialist Republic) Volgograd and Volzhskiy	
7	1963	Russian SFSR	Strela Moscow	group	Imereti Kutaisi	Georgian SSR	(Ukrainian Soviet Socialist Republic) Nikolayev	
8	1964	Russian SFSR	Trud Belaya Kalitva	group	Dinamo-3 Moscow	Russian SFSR	(Russian Soviet Federative Socialist Republic) Baltika Stadium, Kaliningrad	
9	1965	Russian SFSR	Salyut Tambov	group	VVPU Lvov	Ukrainian SSR	(Ukrainian Soviet Socialist Republic) Avangard Stadium, Simferopol	
10	1966	Ukrainian SSR	VVPU Lvov	group	Zvezda Tashkent	Uzbek SSR	(Ukrainian Soviet Socialist Republic) Metallurg Stadium, Dnepropetrovsk	
11	1967	Ukrainian SSR	Sokol Lvov	group	Trud Tula	Russian SFSR	(Azerbaijan Soviet Socialist Republic) Sumgait	
12	1968	Georgian SSR	Sinatle Tbilisi	1–0	Torpedo Minsk	Byelorussian SSR	(Russian Soviet Federative Socialist Republic) City Stadium, Maikop	
13	1969	Georgian SSR	Sinatle Tbilisi	1–1*	Dinamo Moscow OFK-3	Russian SFSR	(Russian Soviet Federative Socialist Republic) Trudovye Rezervy Stadium, Kislovodsk	
14	1970	Russian SFSR	Strela Moscow	3–0	Tsementnik Nikolayev	Ukrainian SSR	(Ukrainian Soviet Socialist Republic) Bukovina Stadium, Chernovtsy	
15	1971	Russian SFSR	Trud Belaya Kalitva	1–0	Tsvetmet Artemovsk	Ukrainian SSR	(Russian Soviet Federative Socialist Republic) Kamensk-Shakhtinsky	
16	1972	Russian SFSR	Dinamo Moscow OFK-3 Almaz	3–1	Zaria Kaluga	Russian SFSR	(Russian Soviet Federative Socialist Republic) Kamensk-Shakhtinsky	
17	1973	Russian SFSR	Zvezda Novosibirsk	1–0	Zaria Kaluga	Russian SFSR	(Russian Soviet Federative Socialist Republic) Kamensk-Shakhtinsky	
18	1974	Georgian SSR	Metallurg Rustavi	2–0	Zaria Kaluga	Russian SFSR	(Russian Soviet Federative Socialist Republic) Mineralnye Vody	
19	1975	Kazakh SSR	Bulat Temirtau	1–0	Saturn Ramenskoe	Russian SFSR	(Russian Soviet Federative Socialist Republic) Kamensk-Shakhtinsky	
20	1976	Russian SFSR	Saturn Ramenskoe	3–0	Vodnik Vanino	Russian SFSR	(Russian Soviet Federative Socialist Republic) Gastello Lokomotiv Stadium, Murom	
21	1977	Russian SFSR	Zaria Kaluga	5–0	Shatlyk Mary	Turkmen SSR	(Ukrainian Soviet Socialist Republic) Armyansk	
22	1978	Russian SFSR	Zaria Kaluga	0–0* (4–2 p)	Bolshevik Kiev	Ukrainian SSR	(Georgian Soviet Socialist Republic) Rustavi	
23	1979	Russian SFSR	Dinamo Leningrad	1–1* (5–3 p)	Zaria Kamensk-Shakhtinsky	Russian SFSR	(Russian Soviet Federative Socialist Republic) Makhachkala	
24	1980	Russian SFSR	Zorkiy Krasnogorsk	2–1	Temp Leningrad	Russian SFSR	(Russian Soviet Federative Socialist Republic) Khimki	
no competitions between 1980 through 1989
25	1989	Georgian SSR	Dinamo Zugdidi	0–1, +:– (Note: Dinamo Odessa refused to travel to Zugdidi, due to recent the 1989 Sukhumi riots.)	Dinamo Odessa	Ukrainian SSR	(Ukrainian Soviet Socialist Republic) Odessa / Zugdidi (Georgian Soviet Socialist Republic)	
26	1990	Ukrainian SSR	Mayak Ochakov	0–0* (3–2 p)	Metallurg Aldan	Russian SFSR	(Kazakh Soviet Socialist Republic) Central Shakhter Stadium, Karaganda	
27	1991	Byelorussian SSR	Metallurg Molodechno	2–1	Pambygchy Barda	Azerbaijan SSR	(Azerbaijan Soviet Socialist Republic) Sumgait	
