= Artem Matus =

Ukrainian footballer (born 2003)

Personal information
- Full name: Artem Valeriovych Matus
- Date of birth: 12 June 2003 (age 23)
- Place of birth: Kryvyi Rih, Ukraine
- Height: 1.87 m (6 ft 2 in)
- Position: Goalkeeper

Team information
- Current team: Lokomotyv Kyiv
- Number: 1

Youth career
- 2016-2018: KhFC Penuel Kryvyi Rih
- 2019-2021: DYuSSh FA Kryvbas Kryvyi Rih

Senior career*
Years	Team	Apps	(Gls)
2020–2021	Kryvbas-2 (Hirnyk)	0	(0)
2021-2022	Krystal	0	(0)
2022	Ahrobiznes	0	(0)
2022-2023	Epitsentr	0	(0)
2023–2025	Kremin Kremenchuk	25	(0)
2024	→ Kremin-2 Kremenchuk	4	(0)
2025–	Lokomotyv Kyiv	3	(0)
- * Club domestic league appearances and goals as of 6 June 2026

Artem Valeriovych Matus (Ukrainian: Артем Валерійович Матус; born 12 June 2003) is a Ukrainian professional footballer who plays as a goalkeeper for Ukrainian club Lokomotyv Kyiv.

== Early life ==
Artem Holiak was born on 12 June 2003, in Kryvyi Rih, Ukraine. As a child, Holiak played for Christian Football Club Penuel in his hometown Kryvyi Rih. He then joined DYuSSh FA Kryvbas. He played a total of 74 matches including First League U-19 Championship with Kryvbas-2 (Hirnyk) and Krystal. Some time from late 2021 and before he signed for Ahrobiznes, Holiak changed his last name to Matus.

== Career ==
=== Kryvbas-2 ===
On 20 September 2020 new team was presented in Kryvyi Rih. Kryvbas-2 was admitted into the Amateur Championship. Hirnyk team was split with first team players becoming Kryvbas and U-19 becoming Kryvbas-2. For the season 2020–21, Matus was in the squad. He was an unused substitute in one match. He had the number 79 shirt. He also took part in First League U-19 Championship that year. Kryvbas-2 played under old name Hirnyk. He featured in 8 matches. He also took part in Kryvyu Rih winter city championship in 2021.

=== Krystal ===
Next season Matus began joined Krystal Chortkiv. He played in First League U-19 Championship for 7 matches.

=== Ahrobiznes ===
On 14 February 2022, Matus moved to Ukrainian First League club Ahrobiznes. He took the number 1 shirt. Next day his club left for a training camp in Turkey. On 24 February 2022, Russia invaded Ukraine. Next day club held a meeting and decided to return to Ukraine. On 28 February Matus was one of four players who returned and was allowed to remain in club, while rest of players who failed to return were told to look for new clubs.

=== Epitsentr ===
During 2022 Summer transfer window he joined newly promoted First League club Epitsentr and took the number 71 shirt. Matus was an unused bench player at Epitsentr. He was on the bench 14 times, but failed to make his debut. During a friendly match with Shturm Ivankiv on 12 February Matus replaced an injured goalkeeper and conceded a goal five minutes later. He also played during second half in a friendly with Nyva on 3 March. Two days later he again featured in second half in a match against . On 20 June 2023 he was released by Epitsentr.

=== Kremin ===
During Summer 2023 Matus was on trial at another First League club Kremin Kremenchuk. He was listed as an unnamed trial player in first preseason matches. On 16 July against Oleksandriia his name appeared in the starting lineup. Few days later it was reported that he was selected by Kremin for the new season. He signed a two-year contract and took the number 71 shirt. He was given a chance to start in his first game and made few good saves. His debut for Kremin was on 28 July in a 0:0 draw against Metalurh. He was selected a man of the match by Sportarena. During his time with the club, Matus played in twenty-six matches. he had five clean sheets and conceded fifty-one goal. He also played four times for Kremin-2 Kremenchuk, where he conceded eleven goals.

=== Lokomotyv Kyiv ===
In September 2025, Matus moved to Second League Lokomotyv Kyiv.

== Career statistics ==
As of 20 January 2026

Appearances and goals by club, season and competition
Club	Season	League			Cup		Other		Total	
Club	Season	Division	Apps	Goals	Apps	Goals	Apps	Goals	Apps	Goals
Kryvbas-2 (Hirnyk)	2020–21	First League U-19 Championship	—		—		—		—	
Kryvbas-2 (Hirnyk)	2020–21	Amateur Championship	—		—		—		—	
Kryvbas-2 (Hirnyk)	Total		—		—		—		—	
Krystal	2021–22	First League U-19 Championship	—		—		—		—	
Ahrobiznes	2021–22	First League	0	0	—		—		0	0
Epitsentr	2022–23	First League	0	0	—		—		0	0
Kremin	2023–24	First League	12	0	—		—		12	0
Kremin	2024–25	First League	13	0	1	0	—		14	0
Kremin	Total		25	0	1	0	—		26	0
Kremin-2	2023–24	Second League	4	0	—		—		4	0
Lokomotyv Kyiv	2025–26	Second League	0	0	—		—		0	0
Career total			29	0	1	0	0	0	30	0
