= 2019–20 Ukrainian First League U-19 Championship =

Ukrainian First League U-19 Championship
- Season: 2019–20

The 2019–20 Ukrainian First League U–19 Championship was the fourth season of the Ukrainian Junior Under 19 Championship in First League. The competition involved participation of several junior teams of the Professional Football League of Ukraine as well as some other football academies. Due to COVID-19 pandemic post season playoffs were canceled and no champion was determined.

Direct administration of the competition belonged to the Youth Football League of Ukraine. The tournament was conducted in cooperation between both Youth Football League and Professional Football League.

The season started on 11 September 2019 with 36 participants. The 2019–20 season features the first winner of the competition from Cherkasy which used to be called Cherkaskyi Dnipro and now Dnipro Cherkasy as well as other long time participants Bukovyna, Barsa, ARZ, and others.

Among newcomers there were Nyva Vinnytsia, Complex Sports School (KDYuSSh) Chempion, Sports School (DYuSSh) 26, Lider, SSSOR (SDYuSShOR) Metalurh, UFK Dnipro, Avanhard Kharkiv, and others. Among the past season participants of the "Four teams tournament" only Avanhard Kramatorsk continues to participate, while SC Dnipro-1 and Kolos Kovalivka joined the Ukrainian Premier League U–19 championship (their main squads were promoted to the Ukrainian Premier League) and Obolon-Brovar Kyiv transitioned its U–19 squad into Obolon-Brovar-2 Bucha that joined professional league competitions in the Second League.

== Teams ==
- Debut: Nyva Vinnytsia, Chempion Kyiv, DYuSSh 26 Kyiv, Bila Tserkva, SDYuShOR Metalurh Zaporizhia, Hirnyk Kryvyi Rih, Lider Dnipro, Nikopol, Zorya-Myronivshchyny, Avanhard Kharkiv
- Returning: Olimpik Kharkiv
- Withdrawn: MFA Mukachevo, Temp Vinnytsia, SC Dnipro, VO DYuSSu Vinnytsia, ARZ Bila Tserkva, Nikopol-Obriy, Kolos Kovalivka, Kremin Kremenchuk, Holkiper Zaporizhia, Metalurh Kamianske, Kvadro Pervomaiskyi

== Group stage ==
=== Group 1 ===
Pos	Team	Pld	W	D	L	GF	GA	GD	Pts	Comments
1	Nyva Vinnytsia	7	6	0	1	17	10	+7	18	Qualification for play-offs
2	Prykarpattia Ivano-Frankivsk	7	6	0	1	18	6	+12	18	Qualification for play-offs
3	Nika Ivano-Frankivsk	7	4	1	2	16	8	+8	13	
4	Bukovyna Chernivtsi	7	3	0	4	13	16	−3	9	
5	Podillya Khmelnytskyi	7	2	2	3	13	16	−3	8	
6	Hirnyk Novoyavorivsk	7	2	1	4	6	11	−5	7	
7	Adrenalin Lutsk	7	1	1	5	8	15	−7	4	
8	Dynamo Lviv	7	1	1	5	9	18	−9	4	

Rules for classification: 1) points 2) wins 4) head-to-head points 5) head-to-head wins 6) head-to-head goal difference 7) head-to-head goals scored 8) goals difference 9) goals scored 10) lesser number of points for cautions and ejections (1– caution; 3– ejection) 11) draw of lots

=== Top goalscorers ===
As of

Rank	Scorer	Team	Goals (Pen.)
1	Andriy Bondaruk	Nika Ivano-Frankivsk	7
2	Andriy Khoma	Prykarpattia Ivano-Frankivsk	6
3	Danylo Drobatyi	Nyva Vinnytsia	5 (1)

=== Group 2 ===
Pos	Team	Pld	W	D	L	GF	GA	GD	Pts	Comments
1	Zmina-Obolon Kyiv	9	7	2	0	20	7	+13	23	Qualification for play-off
2	Complex Sports School Chempion	9	6	0	3	19	12	+7	18	Qualification for play-off
3	Polissya Zhytomyr	9	5	1	3	18	12	+6	16	
4	Chempion Kyiv	9	5	1	3	17	16	+1	16	
5	Lyubomyr Stavyshche	9	4	3	2	18	11	+7	15	
6	imeni Lva Yashina	9	3	2	4	13	14	−1	11	
7	Lokomotyv Kyiv	9	3	1	5	13	15	−2	10	
8	Sports School 26 Kyiv	9	3	0	6	18	23	−5	9	
9	Sports School 15 Kyiv	9	2	2	5	10	18	−8	8	
10	Bila Tserkva	9	0	2	7	5	23	−18	2	

Rules for classification: 1) points 2) wins 4) head-to-head points 5) head-to-head wins 6) head-to-head goal difference 7) head-to-head goals scored 8) goals difference 9) goals scored 10) lesser number of points for cautions and ejections (1– caution; 3– ejection) 11) draw of lots

=== Top goalscorers ===
As of

Rank	Scorer	Team	Goals (Pen.)
1	Roman Tkachenko	Complex Sports School Chempion	11
2	Volodymyr Ryabov	Lyubomyr Stavyshche	8 (3)
3	Vladyslav Vasylenko	Sports School 26 Kyiv	5
3	Arkadiy Studenyak	Lokomotyv Kyiv	5 (3)

=== Group 3 ===
Pos	Team	Pld	W	D	L	GF	GA	GD	Pts	Comments
1	SSSOR Metalurh	9	6	0	3	28	13	+15	18	Qualification for play-offs
2	Hirnyk Kryvyi Rih	9	5	3	1	17	6	+11	18	Qualification for play-offs
3	Olimpik Kropyvnytskyi	9	5	2	2	24	12	+12	17	
4	Atletyk Odesa	9	5	1	3	23	15	+8	16	
5	Dnipro-1 Borysfen	9	4	4	1	13	8	+5	16	
6	Dnipro Cherkasy	9	3	3	3	16	17	−1	12	
7	Lider Dnipro	9	3	2	4	9	11	−2	11	
8	FC Nikopol	9	3	0	6	16	29	−13	9	
9	Maoldis Dnipro	9	2	1	6	14	34	−20	7	
10	Zorya-Myronivshchyny	9	1	0	8	8	23	−15	3	

Rules for classification: 1) points 2) wins 4) head-to-head points 5) head-to-head wins 6) head-to-head goal difference 7) head-to-head goals scored 8) goals difference 9) goals scored 10) lesser number of points for cautions and ejections (1– caution; 3– ejection) 11) draw of lots

=== Top goalscorers ===
As of

Rank	Scorer	Team	Goals (Pen.)
1	Yevheniy Merkulov	Dnipro Cherkasy	7 (1)
2	Ara Khachatryan	SSSOR Metalurh	6 (1)
3	Andriy Nikolenko	Olimpik Kropyvnytskyi	5
3	Oleksandr Bozhinskyi	Atletyk Odesa	5 (1)
3	Ivan Metsenko	SSSOR Metalurh	5 (2)

=== Group 4 ===
Pos	Team	Pld	W	D	L	GF	GA	GD	Pts	Comments
1	Avanhard Kramatorsk	7	5	1	1	22	8	+14	16	Qualification for play-offs
2	Avanhard Kharkiv	7	4	1	2	15	5	+10	13	Qualification for play-offs
3	School of Olympic Reserve im.S.Bubky	7	4	0	3	13	9	+4	12	
4	FC Petrykivka	7	3	3	1	7	5	+2	12	
5	Barsa Sumy	7	3	1	3	19	16	+3	10	
6	Arena Kharkiv	7	3	1	3	8	10	−2	10	
7	Olimpik Kharkiv	7	1	3	3	12	16	−4	6	
8	Kobra Kharkiv	7	0	0	7	3	30	−27	0	

Rules for classification: 1) points 2) wins
4) head-to-head points 5) head-to-head wins 6) head-to-head goal difference 7) head-to-head goals scored
8) goals difference 9) goals scored 10) lesser number of points for cautions and ejections (1– caution; 3– ejection) 11) draw of lots

=== Top goalscorers ===
As of

Rank	Scorer	Team	Goals (Pen.)
1	Valeriy Blazhko	Avanhard Kharkiv	5 (1)
1	Artem Buts	Avanhard Kramatorsk	5 (1)

== See also ==
- 2019–20 Ukrainian First League
- 2019–20 Ukrainian Second League
