= 2016–17 Ukrainian First League Reserves =

Ukrainian Junior Under-19 Championship (First League)
- Season: 2016–17
- Champions: FC Cherkaskyi Dnipro

The 2016–17 Ukrainian Junior Under 19 Championship was an inaugural season of the Ukrainian Junior Under 19 Championship in First League. The competition involved participation of several junior teams of the Professional Football League of Ukraine as well as some other football academies.

Direct administration of the competition belonged to the Youth Football League of Ukraine. The tournament was conducted in cooperation between both Youth Football League and Professional Football League.

== Group stage ==
=== Group 1 ===
| Pos | Team | Pld | W | D | L | GF | GA | GD | Pts | Comments |
|---|---|---|---|---|---|---|---|---|---|---|
| 1 | Cherkaskyi Dnipro (Q) | 18 | 14 | 3 | 1 | 51 | 11 | +40 | 45 | Qualification to Final stage |
| 2 | Barsa Sumy (Q) | 18 | 12 | 3 | 3 | 40 | 12 | +28 | 39 | Qualification for Wild card playoff |
| 3 | UFC Olimpik Kharkiv (Q) | 18 | 11 | 3 | 4 | 46 | 20 | +26 | 36 | Qualification for Wild card playoff |
| 4 | Zhemchuzhyna Odesa | 18 | 10 | 1 | 7 | 48 | 26 | +22 | 31 | Withdrew from competition |
| 5 | Zirka Kyiv (R) | 18 | 9 | 3 | 6 | 42 | 36 | +6 | 30 | Relegation |
| 6 | DYuSSh-15 Kyiv | 18 | 8 | 2 | 8 | 32 | 16 | +16 | 26 | |
| 7 | ARZ Bila Tserkva (Note: ARZ in Bila Tserkva is an accident-rescue detachment of the Ukrainian State Emergency Services, the youth football club was created in 2016) | 18 | 6 | 3 | 9 | 19 | 35 | −16 | 21 | |
| 8 | MFC Zhytomyr | 18 | 4 | 3 | 11 | 12 | 36 | −24 | 15 | |
| 9 | Olimpik-SDYuShOR-2 | 18 | 4 | 0 | 14 | 15 | 71 | −56 | 12 | |
| 10 | Dinaz Vyshhorod (R) | 18 | 2 | 1 | 15 | 15 | 55 | −40 | 7 | Relegation |

Rules for classification: 1) points 2) wins 4) head-to-head points 5) head-to-head wins 6) head-to-head goal difference 7) goal difference 8) goals scored 9) lesser number of points for cautions and ejections (1– caution; 3– ejection) 10) draw of lots
(Q) Qualified for the phase indicated; (R) Relegated

=== Top goalscorers ===
As of 9 June 2017

| Rank | Scorer | Goals (Pen.) | Team |
|---|---|---|---|
| 1 | (Ukraine) Yaroslav Sydorenko | 12 | FC Barsa Sumy |
| 1 | (Ukraine) Serhiy Kyslenko | 12 (1) | UFC Olimpik Kharkiv |
| 3 | (Ukraine) Illya Davydenko | 10 | FC Cherkaskyi Dnipro |

=== Group 2 ===
| Pos | Team | Pld | W | D | L | GF | GA | GD | Pts | Comments |
|---|---|---|---|---|---|---|---|---|---|---|
| 1 | FC Lviv (Q) | 14 | 11 | 1 | 2 | 46 | 9 | +37 | 34 | Qualification to Final stage |
| 2 | Bukovyna Chernivtsi (Q) | 14 | 9 | 2 | 3 | 29 | 20 | +9 | 29 | Qualification for Wild card playoff |
| 3 | Munkacs Sports School (Q) | 14 | 8 | 2 | 4 | 40 | 19 | +21 | 26 | Qualification for Wild card playoff |
| 4 | Teplovyk Sports School-3 | 14 | 8 | 2 | 4 | 30 | 18 | +12 | 26 | |
| 5 | Podillya Khmelnytskyi | 14 | 5 | 3 | 6 | 24 | 25 | −1 | 18 | |
| 6 | Veres Rivne (Note: FC Veres Rivne was admitted to the Ukrainian Premier League and its junior under-19 team will compete in the Ukrainian Premier League tournament for under-19 teams.) (P) | 14 | 3 | 1 | 10 | 11 | 32 | −21 | 10 | Promoted to the Ukrainian Junior Championship (Premier League) |
| 7 | Hirnyk Novoyavorivsk | 14 | 1 | 5 | 8 | 12 | 37 | −25 | 8 | |
| 8 | Opir Lviv | 14 | 1 | 4 | 9 | 11 | 43 | −32 | 7 | |

Rules for classification: 1) points 2) wins 4) head-to-head points 5) head-to-head wins 6) head-to-head goal difference 7) goal difference 8) goals scored 9) lesser number of points for cautions and ejections (1– caution; 3– ejection) 10) draw of lots
(P) Promoted; (Q) Qualified for the phase indicated

=== Top goalscorers ===
As of 9 June 2017

| Rank | Scorer | Goals (Pen.) | Team |
|---|---|---|---|
| 1 | (Ukraine) Yevhen Pidlepenets | 12 | Munkacs Sports School |
| 2 | (Ukraine) Yuriy Shpyrka | 9 | ? |
| 3 | (Ukraine) Andriy Slobodyan | 6 | Teplovyk Sports School-3 |
| 3 | (Ukraine) Mykhailo Zaichuk | 6 | FC Lviv |

== Wild card stage ==
| Team 1 | Agg. | Team 2 | 1st leg | 2nd leg |
|---|---|---|---|---|
| UFC Olimpik Kharkiv | 5–1 | FC Bukovyna Chernivtsi | 1–1 | 4–0 |
| FC Munkacs Mukacheve | 2–2 (3–4 p) | FC Barsa Sumy | 2–0 | 0–2 |

UFC Olimpik Kharkiv and FC Barsa Sumy qualified for the Final stage.

== Final group ==
The final stage was taking place in village Polyana, Svalyava Raion in Zakarpattia.

| Pos | Team | Pld | W | D | L | GF | GA | GD | Pts |
|---|---|---|---|---|---|---|---|---|---|
| 1 | Cherkaskyi Dnipro (C) | 3 | 2 | 1 | 0 | 12 | 3 | +9 | 7 |
| 2 | FC Lviv | 3 | 2 | 1 | 0 | 12 | 4 | +8 | 7 |
| 3 | UFC Olimpik Kharkiv | 3 | 0 | 1 | 2 | 6 | 13 | −7 | 1 |
| 4 | Barsa Sumy | 3 | 0 | 1 | 2 | 3 | 13 | −10 | 1 |

Rules for classification: 1) points 2) wins 4) head-to-head points 5) head-to-head wins 6) head-to-head goal difference 7) goal difference 8) goals scored 9) lesser number of points for cautions and ejections (1– caution; 3– ejection) 10) draw of lots
(C) Champions

== See also ==
- 2016–17 Ukrainian First League
- 2016–17 Ukrainian Second League
