= 2018–19 Ukrainian First League Reserves =

Ukrainian First League U-19 Championship
- Season: 2018–19
- Champions: SC Dnipro-1

The 2018–19 Ukrainian First League U–19 Championship was the third season of the Ukrainian Junior Under 19 Championship in First League. The competition involved participation of several junior teams of the Professional Football League of Ukraine as well as some other football academies.

Direct administration of the competition belonged to the Youth Football League of Ukraine. The tournament was conducted in cooperation between both Youth Football League and Professional Football League.

== Teams ==
- Debut: Adrenalin Lutsk, Dynamo Lviv, Temp Vinnytsia, Zmina-Obolon Kyiv, KDYuSSh Chempion, imeni Lva Yashina, VO DYuSSh Vinnytsia, Petrykivka, Dnipro Cherkasy, Kremin Kremenchuk, Kobra Kharkiv, Holkiper Zaporizhia, Metalurh Kamianske, Avanhard Kramatorsk, Kvadro Pervomaiskyi, UOR imeni Serhia Bubky, Arena Kharkiv, Dnipro-1-Borysfen (additional under-19 team of SC Dnipro-1)
- Withdrawn: Volyn Lutsk, Opir Lviv, DYuSSh Ternopil, DYuSSh Berezhany, Chaika Vyshhorod, Cherkaskyi Dnipro, Heolis Kharkiv, Olimpik Kharkiv

== Group stage ==
=== Group 1 ===
Pos	Team	Pld	W	D	L	GF	GA	GD	Pts	Comments
1	Bukovyna Chernivtsi	16	12	2	2	43	16	+27	38	Qualification for play-offs
2	Nika Ivano-Frankivsk	16	12	1	3	33	12	+21	37	Qualification for play-offs
3	MFA Mukacheve	16	10	3	3	35	18	+17	33	
4	Prykarpattia Ivano-Frankivsk	16	8	2	6	37	25	+12	26	
5	Adrenalin Lutsk	16	7	2	7	20	20	0	23	
6	Dynamo Lviv	16	5	6	5	19	23	−4	21	
7	Podillya Khmelnytskyi	16	3	3	10	16	33	−17	12	
8	Hirnyk Novoyavorivsk	16	1	5	10	8	31	−23	8	
9	Temp Vinnytsia	16	1	2	13	9	42	−33	5	

Rules for classification: 1) points 2) wins 4) head-to-head points 5) head-to-head wins 6) head-to-head goal difference 7) head-to-head goals scored 8) goals difference 9) goals scored 10) lesser number of points for cautions and ejections (1– caution; 3– ejection) 11) draw of lots

=== Top goalscorers ===
As of

Rank	Scorer	Goals (Pen.)	Team

=== Group 2 ===
Pos	Team	Pld	W	D	L	GF	GA	GD	Pts	Comments
1	Obolon-Brovar	22	19	1	2	48	13	+35	58	Qualification for play-off
2	Kolos Kovalivka	22	18	2	2	63	14	+49	56	Qualification for play-off
3	Lyubomyr Stavyshche	22	13	4	5	59	24	+35	43	
4	Zmina-Obolon Kyiv	22	11	3	8	39	34	+5	36	
5	Complex Sports School Champion	21	10	3	8	53	39	+14	33	
6	imeni Lva Yashina	22	9	3	10	37	34	+3	30	
7	Vinnytsia Oblast Sports School	22	9	1	12	29	46	−17	28	
8	ARZ Bila Tserkva	22	6	3	13	22	53	−31	21	
9	Sports School 15 Kyiv	22	5	3	14	26	49	−23	18	
10	Atletyk Odesa	21	5	3	13	26	46	−20	18	
11	Polissya Zhytomyr	22	5	3	14	10	30	−20	18	
12	Lokomotyv Kyiv	22	4	5	13	17	47	−30	17	Relegation

Rules for classification: 1) points 2) wins 4) head-to-head points 5) head-to-head wins 6) head-to-head goal difference 7) head-to-head goals scored 8) goals difference 9) goals scored 10) lesser number of points for cautions and ejections (1– caution; 3– ejection) 11) draw of lots

=== Top goalscorers ===
As of

Rank	Scorer	Goals (Pen.)	Team

=== Group 3 ===
Pos	Team	Pld	W	D	L	GF	GA	GD	Pts	Comments
1	FC Petrykivka	13	10	1	2	41	9	+32	31	Qualification for play-offs
2	Dnipro Cherkasy	12	7	2	3	19	13	+6	23	
3	Kremin Kremenchuk	12	5	4	3	24	16	+8	19	
4	Maoldis Dnipro	12	5	2	5	22	19	+3	17	
5	Olimpik Kropyvnytskyi	12	4	2	6	25	29	−4	14	
6	Holkiper Zaporizhia	13	4	1	8	14	26	−12	13	
7	Nikopol–Obriy	12	2	0	10	11	44	−33	6	
8	Metalurh Kamianske	0	0	0	0	0	0	0	0	

Rules for classification: 1) points 2) wins 4) head-to-head points 5) head-to-head wins 6) head-to-head goal difference 7) head-to-head goals scored 8) goals difference 9) goals scored 10) lesser number of points for cautions and ejections (1– caution; 3– ejection) 11) draw of lots

=== Top goalscorers ===
As of

Rank	Scorer	Goals (Pen.)	Team

=== Group 4 ===
Pos	Team	Pld	W	D	L	GF	GA	GD	Pts	Comments
1	SC Dnipro-1	14	12	0	2	42	8	+34	36	Qualification for play-offs
2	Avanhard Kramatorsk	14	10	1	3	28	8	+20	31	Qualification for play-offs
3	Kvadro Pervomaiskyi	14	8	1	5	39	15	+24	25	
4	School of Olympic Reserve imeni S.Bubky	14	8	3	3	25	19	+6	27	
5	Arena Kharkiv	14	4	4	6	21	22	−1	16	
6	Kobra Kharkiv	14	2	2	10	16	41	−25	8	
7	Dnipro-1-Borysfen	14	3	4	7	15	23	−8	13	
8	Barsa Sumy	14	1	1	12	9	59	−50	4	

Rules for classification: 1) points 2) wins 4) head-to-head points 5) head-to-head wins 6) head-to-head goal difference 7) head-to-head goals scored 8) goals difference 9) goals scored 10) lesser number of points for cautions and ejections (1– caution; 3– ejection) 11) draw of lots

=== Top goalscorers ===
As of

Rank	Scorer	Goals (Pen.)	Team

== Finals ==
=== Quarterfinals ===
Team 1	Agg.	Team 2	1st leg	2nd leg
Nika Ivano-Frankivsk	1–3	Obolon-Brovar Kyiv	1–1	0–2
Kolos Kovalivka	2–1	Bukovyna Chernivtsi	2–0	0–1
Dnipro Cherkasy	2–7	SC Dnipro-1	1–2	1–5
Avanhard Kramatorsk	4–1	FC Petrykivka	2–1	2–0

=== Four teams tournament ===
==== Semifinals ====
in Uman, Cherkasy Oblast

Team 1	Score	Team 2
SC Dnipro-1	1–1 (5–3 p)	Obolon-Brovar Kyiv
Avanhard Kramatorsk	0–0 (5–4 p)	Kolos Kovalivka

==== Game for 3rd place ====
Team 1	Score	Team 2
Kolos Kovalivka	2–1	Obolon-Brovar Kyiv

==== Finals ====
Team 1	Score	Team 2
SC Dnipro-1	1–0	Avanhard Kramatorsk

== See also ==
- 2018–19 Ukrainian First League
- 2018–19 Ukrainian Second League
