= 2017–18 Ukrainian First League Reserves =

Ukrainian Junior Under-19 Championship (First League)
- Season: 2017–18
- Champions: FC Obolon-Brovar Kyiv

The 2017–18 Ukrainian Junior Under 19 Championship was the second season of the Ukrainian Junior Under 19 Championship in First League. The competition involved participation of several junior teams of the Professional Football League of Ukraine as well as some other football academies.

Direct administration of the competition belonged to the Youth Football League of Ukraine. The tournament was conducted in cooperation between both Youth Football League and Professional Football League.

== Teams ==
- Debut: Volyn Lutsk, Nika Ivano-Frankivsk, Rukh Vynnyky, DYuSSh Ternopil, DYuSSh Berezhany, Obolon Kyiv, Kolos Kovalivka, Chaika Vyshhorod, Liubomyr Stavyshche, Lokomotyv Kyiv, Atletyk Odesa, Maoldis Dnipro, Heolis Kharkiv, Nikopol-Obriy, SC Dnipro-1
- Withdrawn: Zhemchuzhyna Odesa, Zirka Kyiv, Dinaz Vyshhorod, FC Lviv, Veres Rivne

== Group stage ==
=== Group 1 ===
Pos	Team	Pld	W	D	L	GF	GA	GD	Pts	Comments
1	Bukovyna Chernivtsi (Q, C)	18	14	1	3	70	22	+48	43	Qualification to Final stage
2	Volyn Lutsk (Q)	18	14	0	4	69	22	+47	42	Qualification for Wild card playoff
3	MFA Mukacheve	18	11	2	5	45	25	+20	35	
4	Opir Lviv	18	9	1	8	33	42	−9	28	
5	Teplovyk Sports School-3	18	9	0	9	33	34	−1	27	
6	Ternopil Sports School	18	7	2	9	35	28	+7	23	
7	Nika Ivano-Frankivsk	18	7	1	10	30	31	−1	22	
8	Rukh Vynnyky	18	6	2	10	26	50	−24	20	
9	Hirnyk Novoyavorivsk	18	5	2	11	24	59	−35	17	
10	Berezhany Sports School	18	2	1	15	24	76	−52	7	Relegation

Rules for classification: 1) points 2) wins 4) head-to-head points 5) head-to-head wins 6) head-to-head goal difference 7) head-to-head goals scored 8) goals difference 9) goals scored 10) lesser number of points for cautions and ejections (1– caution; 3– ejection) 11) draw of lots
(C) Champions; (Q) Qualified for the phase indicated

=== Top goalscorers ===
As of

Rank	Scorer	Goals (Pen.)	Team

=== Group 2 ===
Pos	Team	Pld	W	D	L	GF	GA	GD	Pts	Comments
1	Obolon-Brovar (Q, C)	18	14	3	1	44	18	+26	45	Qualification to Final stage
2	Kolos Kovalivka (Q)	18	13	0	5	42	15	+27	39	Qualification for Wild card playoff
3	Sports School 15 Kyiv	18	11	3	4	54	24	+30	36	
4	Chaika Vyshhorod	18	9	4	5	32	24	+8	31	
5	Lyubomyr Stavyshche	18	8	4	6	31	19	+12	28	
6	ARZ Bila Tserkva	18	7	1	10	36	51	−15	22	
7	Podillya Khmelnytskyi	18	5	2	11	31	57	−26	17	
8	Lokomotyv Kyiv	18	4	4	10	21	37	−16	16	
9	Atletyk Odesa	18	4	1	13	21	41	−20	13	
10	Polissya Zhytomyr	18	1	6	11	12	38	−26	9	Relegation

Rules for classification: 1) points 2) wins 4) head-to-head points 5) head-to-head wins 6) head-to-head goal difference 7) head-to-head goals scored 8) goals difference 9) goals scored 10) lesser number of points for cautions and ejections (1– caution; 3– ejection) 11) draw of lots
(C) Champions; (Q) Qualified for the phase indicated

=== Top goalscorers ===
As of

Rank	Scorer	Goals (Pen.)	Team

=== Group 3 ===
Pos	Team	Pld	W	D	L	GF	GA	GD	Pts	Comments
1	Cherkaskyi Dnipro (Q, C)	14	10	1	3	32	13	+19	31	Qualification to Final stage
2	Olimpik Kharkiv (Q)	14	9	1	4	36	21	+15	28	Qualification for Wild card playoff
3	Maoldis Dnipro	14	8	3	3	30	16	+14	27	
4	Helios Kharkiv	14	8	2	4	32	16	+16	26	
5	Nikopol–Obriy	14	6	1	7	18	26	−8	19	
6	Barsa Sumy	14	5	4	5	20	18	+2	19	
7	SC Dnipro-1	14	1	2	11	11	40	−29	5	
8	Olimpik SS-2	14	1	2	11	22	51	−29	5	

Rules for classification: 1) points 2) wins 4) head-to-head points 5) head-to-head wins 6) head-to-head goal difference 7) head-to-head goals scored 8) goals difference 9) goals scored 10) lesser number of points for cautions and ejections (1– caution; 3– ejection) 11) draw of lots
(C) Champions; (Q) Qualified for the phase indicated

=== Top goalscorers ===
As of

Rank	Scorer	Goals (Pen.)	Team

== Wild card playoffs ==
single round robin tournament

Pos	Team	Pld	W	D	L	GF	GA	GD	Pts	Comments
1	Volyn Lutsk (Q, C)	2	1	1	0	5	4	+1	4	Qualification to Final stage
2	Kolos Kovalivka	2	1	1	0	3	2	+1	4	
3	Olimpik Kharkiv	2	0	0	2	2	4	−2	0	

Rules for classification: 1) points 2) wins 4) head-to-head points 5) head-to-head wins 6) head-to-head goal difference 7) head-to-head goals scored 8) goals difference 9) goals scored 10) lesser number of points for cautions and ejections (1– caution; 3– ejection) 11) draw of lots
(C) Champions; (Q) Qualified for the phase indicated

== Finals ==
single round robin tournament in Chernivtsi

=== Semifinals ===
Team 1	Score	Team 2
Bukovyna Chernivtsi	1–1 (5–6 p)	Cherkaskyi Dnipro
Obolon-Brovar Kyiv	4–2	Volyn Lutsk

=== Game for 3rd place ===
Team 1	Score	Team 2
Bukovyna Chernivtsi	1–0	Volyn Lutsk

=== Finals ===
Team 1	Score	Team 2
Obolon-Brovar Kyiv	4–0	Cherkaskyi Dnipro

== See also ==
- 2017–18 Ukrainian First League
- 2017–18 Ukrainian Second League
