= Ukrainian First League U-19 Championship =

- Founded: 2016
- Country: Ukraine
- Current champions: Dynamo Kyiv
- Most championships: Dynamo Kyiv (2)

The Professional Football League of Ukraine Under-19 (Ukrainian: Всеукраїнські змагання з футболу серед команд юніорів (U–19), romanized: Vseukrainski zmahannia z futbolu sered komand yunioriv) is an alternative under-19 competitions for Ukrainian football junior teams. Created in 2016, it was intended to be a second-tier competition with possible promotion and relegation with the similar Ukrainian Premier League competition.

At the start, the competition was administered jointly by the Professional Football League of Ukraine and the Ukrainian Youth Football League. Following the 2022 full-scale invasion of Russia, the competitions were phased away and administered by the Ukrainian Youth Football League only. Since 2022, the Ukrainian Premier League clubs have started to field their second under-19 teams in this competition.

== History ==
The League was established in 2016 for the 2016–17 season. The relegation and promotion procedure of the league is not regulated. Some teams, clubs of which would gain promotion through competition of senior squads, continue to play in the Ukrainian Premier League competitions among under-19 teams. The competition is voluntary, and no teams are required to be relegated. The competition is open to any teams of the Professional Football League of Ukraine (including First and Second leagues), for which it initially was intended, as well as other youth football clubs and sports schools. No clubs from any of the leagues of the PFL (First or Second) are required to field their under-19 team in the competition. The competition is intended to help prepare a youth squad if a club were to gain promotion to the Ukrainian Premier League.

A playing season of the league consists of two parts, the first group stage, which consists of several groups composed based on geographic principle, where teams play a double round robin. The best top teams qualify for the finals, which are usually played in a group format on "neutral turf" to identify a champion.

== Seasons ==
=== Persha Liha (PFL and DYuFLU) ===
| Season | Champion | Runner-up | Third place | Location of final of fours |
|---|---|---|---|---|
| 2016–17 | Cherkaskyi Dnipro | FC Lviv | UFC Olimpik Kharkiv | Polyana, Zakarpattia Oblast |
| 2017–18 | Obolon-Brovar Kyiv | Cherkaskyi Dnipro | Bukovyna Chernivtsi | Chernivtsi |
| 2018–19 | SC Dnipro-1 | Avanhard Kramatorsk | Kolos Kovalivka | Uman, Cherkasy Oblast |
| 2019–20 | abandoned due to the COVID-19 pandemic | | | |
| 2020–21 | Avanhard Kharkiv | Liubomyr Stavyshche | Prykarpattia Ivano-Frankivsk | Uman, Cherkasy Oblast |
| 2021–22 | unfinished due to the 2022 Russian invasion of Ukraine | | | |

=== Persha Liha (DYuFLU) ===
| Season | Champion | Runner-up | Third place | Location of final of fours |
|---|---|---|---|---|
| 2022–23 | cancelled due to the 2022 Russian invasion of Ukraine (selected teams competed in the Ukrainian Youth Football League) | | | |
| 2023–24 | Dynamo Kyiv | Nyva Vinnytsia | Inhulets Petrove | Shchaslyve, Kyiv Oblast |
| 2024–25 | Dynamo Kyiv | Bukovyna Chernivtsi | Polissya Zhytomyr | Chernivtsi |

=== Regional League (National League of the Future) ===
| Season | Champion | Runner-up | Third place | Location of final of fours |
|---|---|---|---|---|
| 2025–26 | | | | |

== Teams ==
As of 2021 there were at least 10 teams competing in every season since 2016 and 5 more since 2017.

- since 2016 – FC Barsa Sumy (Amateurs), FC Cherkaskyi Dnipro (PFL 1→Amateurs, renamed), DYuSSh-15 Kyiv (Amateurs), MFC Zhytomyr (Amateur→PFL 2, renamed), Olimpik-SDYuShOR-2 Kropyvnytskyi (Amateurs, renamed), FC Bukovyna Chernivtsi (PFL 1→2), Teplovyk-DYuSSh-3 Ivano-Frankivsk (PFL 2→1, renamed), FC Podillya Khmelnytskyi (PFL 2), Hirnyk Novoyavorivsk (Amateurs), ARZ Bila Tservka (Amateurs, renamed)
- since 2017 – Nika Ivano-Frankivsk (Amateurs), Lyubomyr Stavyshche (Amateurs), FC Lokomotyv Kyiv (Amateurs), Atletyk Odesa (Amateurs), FC Helios Kharkiv (PFL 1→Amateurs, renamed)

Please note, in 2018 based on the Cherkaskyi Dnipro under-19 team there was revived FC Dnipro Cherkasy, while Cherkaskyi Dnipro was reorganized as FC Cherkashchyna due to financial hardship, see the club's article for more information. Also, in 2018 Kobra Kharkiv tried to replace FC Helios Kharkiv in the Ukrainian First League, but was not successful, its junior team however was admitted in under-19 competitions replacing the Helios Kharkiv under-19 team.

=== Participated teams by regions ===
As of 15 September 2025

| Region | Teams |
|---|---|
| Crimea/Sevastopol | none |
| Cherkasy Oblast | Cherkaskyi Dnipro (2: 2016/17, 2017/18), Dnipro Cherkasy (4: 2018/19–2021/22) |
| Chernihiv Oblast | Chernihiv (2: 2024/25, 2025/26), SDYuShOR Desna Chernihiv (1: 2025/26) |
| Chernivtsi Oblast | K3 Bukovyna Chernivtsi (8: 2016/17–2024/25), FSC Chernivtsi (1: 2021/22) |
| Dnipropetrovsk Oblast | Maoldis Dnipro (3: 2017/18–2019/20), Nikopol[-Obriy] (3: 2017/18–2019/20), SC Dnipro-1 (2: 2017/18, 2018/19), FC Petrykivka (2: 2018/19, 2019/20), Metalurh Kamianske (1: 2018/19), Borysfen Dnipro (2: 2018/19, 2019/20), Kryvbas [Hirnyk] Kryvyi Rih (3: 2019/20–2021/22), Lider Dnipro (2: 2019/20, 2020/21), Kryvbas-84 Kryvyi Rih (4: 2020/21–2024/25), Enerhiya Dnipro (1: 2020/21), Penuel Kryvyi Rih (2: 2021/22, 2024/25), MDYuSSh Dnipro (3: 2023/24, 2024/25, 2025/26), Kamianske-2023 (1: 2023/24), DYuSSh-2 Dnipro (1: 2023/24), Akademiya Rotania ta Zozuli Dnipro (2: 2024/25, 2025/26) |
| Donetsk Oblast | [Avanhard] Kramatorsk (4: 2018/19–2021/22), UOR imeni Bubky Bakhmut (4: 2018/19–2021/22) |
| Ivano-Frankivsk Oblast | DYuSSh-3 Prykarpattia [Teplovyk] Ivano-Frankivsk (6: 2016/17–2021/22), Nika Ivano-Frankivsk (4: 2017/18–2020/21), FC Uhornyky (1: 2021/22), Varatyk Kolomyia (2: 2023/24, 2025/26) |
| Kharkiv Oblast | UFC Olimpik Kharkiv (3: 2016/17, 2017/18, 2019/20), Kobra [Helios] Kharkiv (4: 2017/18–2020/21), Kvadro Pervomaiskyi (1: 2018/19), Arena Kharkiv (2: 2018/19, 2019/20), Avanhard Kharkiv (2: 2019/20, 2020/21), Kh[DVU]FKS Kharkiv (2: 2020/21, 2021/22), Maister miacha Kharkiv (2: 2020/21, 2021/22), OKKO-2020 Kharkiv (2: 2020/21, 2023/24), Avanhard Lozova (1: 2021/22), Vostok Kharkiv (1: 2023/24), Fakel Solonytsivka (2: 2024/25, 2025/26), Metalist 1925-2 Kharkiv (1: 2025/26), Metalist 1925 Kharkiv (1: 2025/26) |
| Kherson Oblast | DYuSSh Kherson (2: 2020/21, 2021/22) |
| Khmelnytskyi Oblast | Podillia Khmelnytskyi (9: 2016/17–2025/26) |
| Kirovohrad Oblast | Olimpik-[SDYuShOR-2] (6: 2016/17–2021/22), Zirka Kropyvnytskyi (1: 2021/22), Inhulets Petrove (3: 2023/24, 2024/25, 2025/26) |
| Kyiv City | Zirka (1: 2016/17), DYuSSh-15[-Kudrivka] (8: 2016/17–2024/25), Obolon-Brovar (2: 2017/18, 2018/19), Lokomotyv (6: 2017/18–2020/21, 2024/25, 2025/26), Zmina-Obolon (4: 2018/19–2021/22), KDYuSSh Chempion (4: 2018/19–2021/22), imeni Yashina (2: 2018/19, 2019/20), Chempion (1: 2019/20), KDYuSSh-26 (5: 2019/20–2024/25), FA Arsenal (2: 2020/21, 2021/22), Skailark (1: 2020/21), Yednist (1: 2020/21), K3 KDYuSSh Nika[-Rebel] (4: 2021/22, 2023/24, 2024/25, 2025/26), DYuSSh-1 (1: 2021/22), Dynamo (2: 2023/24, 2024/25), DYuSSh Atlet (2: 2024/25, 2025/26), DYuSSh-10 (2: 2024/25, 2025/26), Arsenal-KNUBA (1: 2025/26) |
| Kyiv Oblast | ARZ Bila Tserkva (3: 2016/17–2018/19), Dinaz Vyshhorod (2: 2016/17, 2023/24), Kolos Kovalivka (3: 2017/18, 2018/19, 2025/26), Chaika Vyshhorod (1: 2017/18), Lyubomyr Stavyshche (5: 2017/18–2021/22), DYuSSh Bila Tserkva (2: 2019/20, 2020/21), Zoria-Myronivshchyny Myronivka (2: 2019/20, 2020/21), Favoryt Boryspil (1: 2021/22), KDYuSSh Shchaslyve (1: 2023/24), Yuryiv Bila Tserkva (1: 2025/26) |
| Luhansk Oblast | none |
| Lviv Oblast | FC Lviv (1: 2016/17), Hirnyk Novoyavorivsk (5: 2016/17–2020/21), Opir Lviv (2: 2017/18), Rukh Vynnyky (1: 2017/18), DYuFA Dynamo Lviv (4: 2018/19, 2019/20, 2024/25, 2025/26), FC Kulykiv (1: 2021/22), Halychyna Lviv (1: 2021/22), Pokrova Lviv (3: 2023/24, 2024/25, 2025/26), Univer-Lviv (1: 2024/25), AF Skala 1911 Stryi (1: 2025/26) |
| Mykolaiv Oblast | none |
| Odesa Oblast | Zhemchuzhyna Odesa (1: 2016/17), Atletyk Odesa (7: 2017/18–2024/25), Chornomorets Odesa (2: 2020/21, 2021/22), Khadzhybei Usatove (2: 2021/22, 2025/26) |
| Poltava Oblast | Kremin Kremenchuk (1: 2018/19), Vorskla Poltava (1: 2021/22), imeni Horpynka Poltava (2: 2021/22, 2023/24), Molod Poltava (2: 2024/25, 2025/26), Dynamo Ukrayiny Poltava (1: 2025/26) |
| Rivne Oblast | Veres Rivne (1: 2016/17) |
| Sumy Oblast | Barsa Sumy (6: 2016/17–2021/22) |
| Ternopil Oblast | DYuSSh Ternopil (2: 2017/18, 2025/26), DYuSSh Berezhany (1: 2017/18), Krystal Chortkiv (2: 2020/21, 2021/22) |
| Vinnytsia Oblast | Temp Vinnytsia (1: 2018/19), VODYuSSh (1: 2018/19), Nyva Vinnytsia (4: 2019/20, 2020/21, 2023/24, 2025/26), DYuSSh Lehion Yakushyntsi (2: 2024/25, 2025/26) |
| Volyn Oblast | Volyn Lutsk (1: 2017/18), Adrenalin Lutsk (2: 2018/19, 2019/20) |
| Zakarpattia Oblast | MFA Munkacs (3: 2016/17–2018/19), SKhI Uzhhorod (1: 2023/24), AF Mynai (1: 2025/26) |
| Zaporizhzhia Oblast | Holkiper Zaporizhia (1: 2018/19), SDYuShOR Metalurh Zaporizhia (2: 2019/20, 2020/21), FSh Metalurh Zaporizhia (2: 2024/25, 2025/26), OSDYuShOR Metalurh Zaporizhia (1: 2025/26) |
| Zhytomyr Oblast | Polissia [MFC] Zhytomyr (8: 2016/17–2021/22, 2024/25, 2025/26) |

== See also ==
- Ukrainian First League
- Ukrainian Premier League Reserves and Under 19
- Ukrainian Youth Football League, main national youth competitions among teenagers in four age categories up to under 17 and divided into two leagues for each age category
