= 2001–02 Ukrainian First League =

Ukrainian First League
- Season: 2001–02
- Champions: Volyn-1 Lutsk
- Promoted: Volyn-1 Lutsk, Chornomorets Odesa, Obolon Kyiv
- Relegated: Elektrometalurh-NZF Nikopol, Dnipro-2 Dnipropetrovsk, Nyva Ternopil
- Top goalscorer: (17) Vasyl Sachko (Volyn Lutsk) and Viktor Arefyev (Stal Alchevsk)

The 2001–02 Ukrainian First League was the eleventh season of the Ukrainian First League which was won by SC Volyn-1 Lutsk. The season started on July 17, 2001, and finished on June 16, 2002.

== Promotion and relegation ==
=== Promoted teams ===
Three clubs promoted from the 2000–01 Ukrainian Second League.

Group A

- FC Polissya Zhytomyr – champion (returning after a season)

Group B

- FC Obolon Kyiv – champion (returning after a season)

Group C

- FC Naftovyk Okhtyrka – champion (returning after a season)

=== Relegated teams ===
Two clubs were relegated from the 2000-01 Ukrainian Top League:

- FC Stal Alchevsk – 14th place (returning after a season)
- FC Nyva Ternopil – 15th place (debut)

=== Renamed teams ===
- FC Lviv merged with Karpaty becoming their farm team and changed its name to FC Karpaty-2 Lviv before the season.
- FC Metalurh Nikopol changed its name to FC Elektrometalurh-NZF Nikopol before the season.
- Due to reorganization of FC Arsenal Kyiv, FC CSKA-2 Kyiv changed its name back to FC CSKA Kyiv during winter break.

=== Teams ===
In 2001-02 season, the Ukrainian First League consists of the following teams:

Locations of teams in First League

== Final table ==
| Pos | Team | Pld | W | D | L | GF | GA | GD | Pts | Promotion or relegation |
|---|---|---|---|---|---|---|---|---|---|---|
| 1 | Volyn-1 Lutsk (C, P) | 34 | 25 | 3 | 6 | 56 | 24 | +32 | 78 | Promoted to Vyshcha Liha |
| 2 | Chornomorets Odesa (P) | 34 | 21 | 4 | 9 | 48 | 21 | +27 | 67 | Promoted to Vyshcha Liha |
| 3 | Obolon Kyiv (P) | 34 | 18 | 8 | 8 | 49 | 26 | +23 | 62 | Promoted to Vyshcha Liha |
| 4 | Polissia Zhytomyr | 34 | 16 | 10 | 8 | 41 | 32 | +9 | 58 (Note: The result of the 25th round match Borysfen Boryspil - FC Polissya Zhytomyr (1:2) was annulled and replaced with such -:-, with no points added to either team.) | Qualification for promotion play-off |
| 5 | Prykarpattia Ivano-Frankivsk | 34 | 15 | 8 | 11 | 41 | 27 | +14 | 53 | |
| 6 | Stal Alchevsk | 34 | 14 | 8 | 12 | 42 | 34 | +8 | 50 | |
| 7 | Naftovyk Okhtyrka | 34 | 13 | 10 | 11 | 35 | 32 | +3 | 49 | |
| 8 | Dynamo-2 Kyiv | 34 | 11 | 14 | 9 | 42 | 32 | +10 | 47 | |
| 9 | Zirka Kirovohrad | 34 | 11 | 13 | 10 | 29 | 28 | +1 | 46 | |
| 10 | SC Mykolaiv | 34 | 12 | 10 | 12 | 37 | 44 | −7 | 46 | |
| 11 | Shakhtar-2 Donetsk | 34 | 13 | 7 | 14 | 50 | 46 | +4 | 46 | |
| 12 | Karpaty-2 Lviv | 34 | 12 | 6 | 16 | 41 | 52 | −11 | 42 | |
| 13 | Borysfen Boryspil | 34 | 10 | 10 | 14 | 43 | 45 | −2 | 40 | |
| 14 | CSKA Kyiv | 34 | 10 | 9 | 15 | 32 | 39 | −7 | 39 | |
| 15 | Nyva Vinnytsia | 34 | 10 | 8 | 16 | 35 | 52 | −17 | 38 | |
| 16 | Elektrometalurh-NZF Nikopil (R) | 34 | 10 | 7 | 17 | 30 | 41 | −11 | 37 | Relegated to Second League |
| 17 | Dnipro-2 Dniproperivsk (R) | 34 | 8 | 7 | 19 | 29 | 48 | −19 | 31 | Relegated to Second League |
| 18 | Nyva Ternopil (R) | 34 | 3 | 4 | 27 | 20 | 77 | −57 | 13 | Relegated to Second League |

(C) Champions; (P) Promoted; (R) Relegated
Notes:

Persha Liha 2001-02 Winners
FC Volyn Lutsk
First title

== Promotion play-off ==
2002-06-16
17:00 LST

| Polihraftekhnika Oleksandriya | 1 – 0 | Polissya Zhytomyr |
|---|---|---|
| Babych 45+2'; Martynenko (yellow card) 30' (yellow-red card) 78' | Report |

CSK ZSU Stadium, Kyiv
Attendance: 5,000
Referee: Serhiy Shebek (Kyiv)

FC Polissya Zhytomyr failed to obtain a berth in the 2002–03 Vyshcha Liha.

== Top scorers ==
Statistics are taken from here.

| | Scorer | Goals (Pen.) | Team |
|---|---|---|---|
| 1 | (Ukraine) Vasyl Sachko | 17 (1) | Volyn-1 Lutsk |
| 1 | (Ukraine) Viktor Arefyev | 17 (5) | Stal Alchevsk |
| 3 | (Ukraine) Vyacheslav Tereschenko | 16 (1) | Obolon Kyiv |
| 4 | (Ukraine) Pavlo Parshyn | 14 (4) | Polissya Zhytomyr |
| 5 | (Ukraine) Volodymyr Skrypka | 13 | SC Mykolaiv |
| 6 | (Ukraine) Pavlo Onysko | 12 | Karpaty-2 Lviv |
| 7 | (Ukraine) Volodymyr Hashchyn | 11 (3) | Volyn-1 Lutsk |
| 8 | (Ukraine) Kostiantyn Balabanov | 10 | Chornomorets Odesa |
| 8 | (Ukraine) Pavlo Zakharov | 10 (7) | Naftovyk Okhtyrka |
| 10 | (Ukraine) Oleksandr Sobkovych | 7 (4) | Obolon Kyiv |

== See also ==
- 2001–02 Ukrainian Premier League
- 2001–02 Ukrainian Second League
- 2001–02 Ukrainian Cup
