= National Youth Competition =

National Youth Competition may refer to:

- National Youth Competition (rugby league), Australia and New Zealand
- Ukrainian National Youth Competition - (Association football)
