= 2020–21 Ukrainian First League U-19 Championship =

Ukrainian First League U-19 Championship
- Season: 2020–21

The 2020–21 Ukrainian First League U–19 Championship was the fifth season of the Ukrainian Junior Under 19 Championship in First League. The competition involved participation of several junior teams of the Professional Football League of Ukraine as well as some other football academies.

Direct administration of the competition belonged to the Youth Football League of Ukraine. The tournament was conducted in cooperation between both Youth Football League and Professional Football League. Competitions started on 9 September 2020.

== Teams ==
- Debut: Krystal Chortkiv, Skailark Kyiv, Arsenal Kyiv, Yednist Kyiv, DYuSSh-1-Kryvbas-84, Chornomorets Odesa, DYuSSh Kherson, KhDVUFK-1 Kharkiv, Maister miacha Kharkiv, Enerhiya Dnipro, OKKO Kharkiv
- Withdrawn: Adrenalin Lutsk, Dynamo Lviv, imeni Yashina Kyiv, Chempion Kyiv, Dnipro-1-Borysfen, Maoldis Dnipro, Nikopol, Petrykivka, Arena Kharkiv, Olimpik Kharkiv

== Group stage ==
=== Group 1 ===
Pos	Team	Pld	W	D	L	GF	GA	GD	Pts	Comments
1	Bukovyna Chernivtsi	12	9	2	1	26	11	+15	29	Qualification for play-offs
2	Prykarpattia Ivano-Frankivsk	12	8	1	3	35	14	+21	25	Qualification for play-offs
3	Podillya Khmelnytskyi	12	6	2	4	21	19	+2	20	
4	Nyva Vinnytsia	12	6	1	5	22	27	−5	19	
5	Krystal Chortkiv	12	4	1	7	19	21	−2	13	
6	Nika Ivano-Frankivsk	12	3	0	9	15	27	−12	9	
7	Hirnyk Novoyavorivsk	12	2	1	9	17	36	−19	7	

Source: https://duflu.org.ua/pervaya-lyga/
Rules for classification: 1) points 2) wins 4) head-to-head points 5) head-to-head wins 6) head-to-head goal difference 7) head-to-head goals scored 8) goals difference 9) goals scored 10) lesser number of points for cautions and ejections (1– caution; 3– ejection) 11) draw of lots

=== Top goalscorers ===
As of

Rank	Scorer	Goals (Pen.)	Team

=== Group 2 ===
Pos	Team	Pld	W	D	L	GF	GA	GD	Pts	Comments
1	Sports School 15 Kyiv	20	15	2	3	82	22	+60	47	Qualification for play-off
2	Lyubomyr Stavyshche	20	15	1	4	44	18	+26	46	Qualification for play-off
3	Complex Sports School Champion	20	14	2	4	95	31	+64	44	
4	Arsenal Kyiv	20	9	2	9	46	33	+13	29	
5	Lokomotyv Kyiv	20	7	4	9	32	49	−17	25	
6	Skailark Kyiv	20	7	3	10	27	45	−18	24	
7	Sports School 26 Kyiv	20	6	6	8	31	40	−9	24	
8	Bila Tserkva	20	4	2	14	17	61	−44	14	
9	Zmina-Obolon Kyiv	20	4	2	14	22	63	−41	14	
10	Yednist Kyiv	20	1	3	16	15	75	−60	6	
11	Polissya Zhytomyr	17	12	1	4	40	19	+21	37	
12	Zoria Myronivshchyny	0	0	0	0	0	0	0	0	Withdrew

Source: https://duflu.org.ua/pervaya-lyga/
Rules for classification: 1) points 2) wins 4) head-to-head points 5) head-to-head wins 6) head-to-head goal difference 7) head-to-head goals scored 8) goals difference 9) goals scored 10) lesser number of points for cautions and ejections (1– caution; 3– ejection) 11) draw of lots

=== Top goalscorers ===
As of

Rank	Scorer	Goals (Pen.)	Team

=== Group 3 ===
Pos	Team	Pld	W	D	L	GF	GA	GD	Pts	Comments
1	Kryvbas-84	14	9	3	2	33	13	+20	30	Qualification for play-offs
2	Hirnyk Kryvyi Rih	14	8	3	3	37	17	+20	27	Qualification for play-offs
3	Chornomorets Odesa	14	7	4	3	30	14	+16	25	
4	Atletyk Odesa	14	6	3	5	25	19	+6	21	
5	DYuSSh Kherson	14	6	2	6	26	36	−10	20	
6	Dnipro Cherkasy	14	5	2	7	25	23	+2	17	
7	Olimpik Kropyvnytskyi	14	3	1	10	10	42	−32	10	
8	Metalurh Zaporizhzhia	0	0	0	0	0	0	0	0	Withdrew

Source: https://duflu.org.ua/pervaya-lyga/
Rules for classification: 1) points 2) wins 4) head-to-head points 5) head-to-head wins 6) head-to-head goal difference 7) head-to-head goals scored 8) goals difference 9) goals scored 10) lesser number of points for cautions and ejections (1– caution; 3– ejection) 11) draw of lots

=== Top goalscorers ===
As of

Rank	Scorer	Goals (Pen.)	Team

=== Group 4 ===
Pos	Team	Pld	W	D	L	GF	GA	GD	Pts	Comments
1	Avanhard Kharkiv	12	8	3	1	30	9	+21	27	Qualification for play-offs
2	KhDVUFK-1 Kharkiv	12	8	1	3	31	17	+14	25	Qualification for play-offs
3	Avanhard Kramatorsk	12	8	1	3	29	18	+11	25	
4	Barsa Sumy	12	6	1	5	25	16	+9	19	
5	College imeni Bubky	12	2	4	6	13	22	−9	10	
6	Maister miacha Kharkiv	12	3	1	8	14	35	−21	10	
7	Enerhiya Dnipro	0	0	0	0	0	0	0	0	Withdrew
8	Kobra Kharkiv	0	0	0	0	0	0	0	0	Withdrew
9	Lider Dnipro	0	0	0	0	0	0	0	0	Withdrew
10	OKKO Kharkiv	0	0	0	0	0	0	0	0	Withdrew

Source: https://duflu.org.ua/pervaya-lyga/
Rules for classification: 1) points 2) wins 4) head-to-head points 5) head-to-head wins 6) head-to-head goal difference 7) head-to-head goals scored 8) goals difference 9) goals scored 10) lesser number of points for cautions and ejections (1– caution; 3– ejection) 11) draw of lots

=== Top goalscorers ===
As of

Rank	Scorer	Goals (Pen.)	Team

== Finals ==
=== Quarterfinals ===
Team 1	Agg.	Team 2	1st leg	2nd leg
Prykarpattia Ivano-Frankivsk	5–1	DYuSSh-15 Kyiv	3–0	2–1
Liubomyr Stavyshche	0–0 (4–1 p)	Bukovyna Chernivtsi	0–0	0–0
Hirnyk Kryvyi Rih	0–4	Avanhard Kharkiv	0–0	0–4
KhDVUFK-1 Kharkiv	3–3 (a)	Kryvbas-84 Kryvyi Rih	2–0	1–3

=== Four teams tournament ===
The final tournament took place in Uman on June 4-5, 2021.

==== Semifinals ====
Team 1	Score	Team 2
Prykarpattia Ivano-Frankivsk	1–1 (8–9 p)	Liubomyr Stavyshche
Avanhard Kharkiv	6–1	KhDVUFK-1 Kharkiv

==== Game for 3rd place ====
Team 1	Score	Team 2
Prykarpattia Ivano-Frankivsk	0–0 (6–5 p)	KhDVUFK-1 Kharkiv

==== Finals ====
Team 1	Score	Team 2
Avanhard Kharkiv	3–0	Liubomyr Stavyshche

== See also ==
- 2020–21 Ukrainian First League
- 2020–21 Ukrainian Second League
