= 2024–25 Ukrainian Premier League Under-19 =

Ukrainian Premier League Under-19
- Season: 2024–25
- Champions: Dynamo Kyiv
- Relegated: Vorskla Poltava; Chornomorets Odesa; Livyi Bereh Kyiv; Inhulets Petrove
- Top goalscorer: Dmytriy Kremchanin (23)

The 2024–25 Ukrainian Premier League Under-19 season were competitions between the youth teams of the Ukrainian Premier League.

== Teams ==
Entering	Replaced
Karpaty Lviv; Inhulets Petrove; Livyi Bereh Kyiv	SC Dnipro-1; Metalist 1925 Kharkiv; FC Mynai

=== Stadiums ===
Rank	Stadium	Place	Club	Capacity	Notes
1	SKIF	Lviv	Karpaty Lviv	4,033	
2	Livyi Bereh	Hnidyn, Kyiv Oblast	Livyi Bereh Kyiv	1,372	
3	Spartak Arena	Zhytomyr	Polissya Zhytomyr	1,242	
4	Arsenal Arena	Shchaslyve, Kyiv Oblast	Shakhtar Donetsk	1,000	
5	Sokil	Lviv	Inhulets Petrove	1,000	
6	imeni Bohdana Markevycha	Vynnyky, Lviv	Rukh Lviv	900	
7	Dynamo training base	Kyiv	Dynamo Kyiv Zorya Luhansk	750	
8	Molodizhnyi	Poltava	Vorskla Poltava	680	
9	Ltava	Poltava	Vorskla Poltava	650	extra
10	Lyustdorf sports and recreational complex	Odesa	Chornomorets Odesa	500	
11	Nika-plyus	Oleksandriya, Kirovohrad Oblast	FC Oleksandriya	500	
12	Sparta	Kryvyi Rih, Dnipropetrovsk Oblast	Kryvbas Kryvyi Rih	484	
13	LNZ Arena	Lebedyn, Cherkasy Oblast	LNZ Cherkasy	376	extra
14	FC LNZ training base	Heronymivka, Cherkasy Oblast	LNZ Cherkasy	300	
15	Arsenal Arena (indoor)	Shchaslyve, Kyiv Oblast	Zorya Luhansk	250	extra
16	Kolos training base	Sofiivska Borshchahivka, Kyiv Oblast	Kolos Kovalivka	250	
17	Rukh training base	Vynnyky, Lviv	Rukh Lviv	250	extra
18	Veres training base	Rivne	Veres Rivne	200	
19	Obolon training base	Bucha, Kyiv Oblast	Obolon Kyiv	150	

== League table ==
Pos	Team	Pld	W	D	L	GF	GA	GD	Pts	Qualification or relegation
1	Dynamo Kyiv (C)	30	26	2	2	104	12	+92	80	Qualification to Domestic Champions path
2	Shakhtar Donetsk	30	24	4	2	86	23	+63	76	
3	Karpaty Lviv	30	18	8	4	72	28	+44	62	
4	Kolos Kovalivka	30	18	7	5	64	30	+34	61	
5	Veres Rivne	30	14	6	10	39	33	+6	48	
6	Rukh Lviv	30	13	8	9	52	43	+9	47	
7	Polissia Zhytomyr	30	11	11	8	54	35	+19	44	
8	Obolon Kyiv	30	11	6	13	41	47	−6	39	
9	Zorya Luhansk	30	10	5	15	53	63	−10	35	
10	Vorskla Poltava	30	8	10	12	33	47	−14	34	Relegated
11	Kryvbas Kryvyi Rih	30	7	10	13	41	56	−15	31 (Note: Head-to-head points: Kryvbas Kryvyi Rih 4, Oleksandriya 1.)	
12	Oleksandriya	30	8	7	15	42	61	−19	31	
13	Livyi Bereh Kyiv	30	7	6	17	32	67	−35	27	Relegated
14	Chornomorets Odesa	30	5	4	21	28	67	−39	19	Relegated
15	Inhulets Petrove	30	4	6	20	26	74	−48	18	Relegated
16	LNZ Cherkasy	30	4	4	22	21	102	−81	16	

Source: Ukrainian Premier League website
Rules for classification: 1) Points; 2) Head-to-head points; 3) Head-to-head goal difference; 4) Head-to-head higher number of goals scored; 5) Goal difference; 6) Higher number of goals scored; 7) Draw or "Golden match" if two teams tied for title (Article 22, paragraph 3).
(C) Champions

=== Top scorers ===
Scorer	Team	Goals (Pen.)
(Ukraine) Dmytriy Kremchanin	Dynamo Kyiv	23 (0)
(Ukraine) Fedir Zadorozhnyi	Zorya → Dynamo	21 (5)
(Ukraine) Oleksiy Bezruchuk	Kolos Kovalivka	17 (1)
(Ukraine) Viktor Tsukanov	Shakhtar Donetsk	16 (6)
(Ukraine) Vladyslav Herych	Dynamo Kyiv	13 (1)

Source: Ukrainian Premier League website

== See also ==
- 2024–25 Ukrainian Premier League
