= Faryd Suleyman =

Ukrainian footballer

Personal information
- Full name: Faryd Khemayatulatovych Suleyman
- Date of birth: 3 January 1994 (age 32)
- Place of birth: Ukraine
- Height: 1.85 m (6 ft 1 in)
- Position: Striker

Team information
- Current team: FC Sumy
- Number: 9

Youth career
- 2007–2009: FC Metalurh Donetsk
- 2009: FC Monolit Illichivsk
- 2009–2011: FC Metalist Kharkiv

Senior career*
Years	Team	Apps	(Gls)
2012–2014	FC Barsa Sumy (amateur)	?	(?)
2014–	FC Sumy	20	(1)

International career^{‡}
2009–2010	Ukraine-17	4	(0)
- * Club domestic league appearances and goals as of 30 September 2015 ‡ National team caps and goals as of 30 September 2015

Faryd Suleyman (Ukrainian: Фарид Хемаятулатович Сулейман; born 3 January 1994) is a Ukrainian footballer currently playing as a striker in the FC Sumy.

Suleyman is a product of the FC Metalurh Donetsk, FC Monolit and FC Metalist youth sportive school systems.

After playing at amateur level, in July 2014 he signed a contract with FC Sumy in the Ukrainian First League.
