= 2002–03 Vyshcha Liha =

12th season of top-tier football league in Vyshcha Liha

Vyshcha Liha
- Season: 2002–03
- Champions: Dynamo Kyiv; 10th title
- Relegated: Metalist Kharkiv; Oleksandriia
- Champions League: Dynamo Kyiv; Shakhtar Donetsk
- UEFA Cup: Metalurh Donetsk; Dnipro Dnipropetrovsk
- Matches played: 240
- Top goalscorer: (22) Maksim Shatskikh (Dynamo Kyiv)
- Biggest home win: Dynamo - Vorskla 8:0
- Biggest away win: Metalurh Zp - Arsenal 0:5
- Highest scoring: Arsenal - Volyn 8:1; Volyn - Dnipro 4:5

The 2002–03 Vyshcha Liha season was the 12th since its establishment. FC Shakhtar Donetsk were the defending champions.

== Teams ==
=== Promotions ===
- Volyn-1 Lutsk, the winners of the 2001–02 Ukrainian First League – (returning after absence of 6 seasons)
- Chornomorets Odesa, the runners-up of the 2001–02 Ukrainian First League – (returning after absence of 2 seasons)
- Obolon Kyiv, the third placed of the 2001–02 Ukrainian First League – (debut)

=== Renamed ===
- On 22 July 2002 SC Volyn-1 Lutsk changed its name to FC Volyn Lutsk.
- 17 December 2002 FC Metalurh Mariupol changed its name to FC Illichivets Mariupol.
- 25 February 2003 FC Polihraftekhnika Oleksandriya changed its name to FC Oleksandriya.

=== Location ===
Locations of teams home grounds in Ukrainian Premier League 2002-03

== League table ==
Pos	Team	Pld	W	D	L	GF	GA	GD	Pts	Qualification or relegation
1	Dynamo Kyiv (C)	30	23	4	3	66	20	+46	73	Qualification to Champions League third qualifying round
2	Shakhtar Donetsk	30	22	4	4	61	24	+37	70	Qualification to Champions League second qualifying round
3	Metalurh Donetsk	30	18	6	6	44	26	+18	60	Qualification to UEFA Cup first round
4	Dnipro Dnipropetrovsk	30	18	5	7	48	27	+21	59	Qualification to UEFA Cup qualifying round
5	Arsenal Kyiv	30	16	8	6	49	24	+25	56	
6	Volyn Lutsk	30	12	5	13	37	44	−7	41	
7	Karpaty Lviv	30	9	9	12	29	37	−8	36	
8	Chornomorets Odesa	30	10	4	16	31	45	−14	34	
9	Tavriya Simferopol	30	9	7	14	36	50	−14	34	
10	Illichivets Mariupol	30	8	10	12	34	38	−4	34	
11	Vorskla Poltava	30	8	8	14	26	41	−15	32	
12	Kryvbas Kryvyi Rih	30	8	7	15	25	37	−12	31	
13	PFC Oleksandriya (D)	30	7	9	14	26	43	−17	30	Withdrew
14	Obolon Kyiv	30	7	7	16	32	45	−13	28	
15	Metalurh Zaporizhzhia	30	6	8	16	22	41	−19	26	Avoided relegation
16	Metalist Kharkiv (R)	30	6	5	19	19	43	−24	23	Relegated to Ukrainian First League

Source: uafootball.net.ua
Rules for classification: 1) Points; 2) Most total wins; 3) Goal difference; 4) Goal ratio; 5) Most total goals scored; 6) Fair play; 7) Head-to-head points; 8) Head-to-head wins; 9) Head-to-head goal difference; 10) Head-to-head goals scored; 11) Head-to-head goal ratio; 12) Head-to-head fair play; 13) Draw.
(C) Champions; (D) Disqualified; (R) Relegated

== Results ==
Home \ Away	ARK	CHO	DNI	DYN	ILL	KAR	KRY	MET	MDO	MZA	OBO	OLK	SHA	TAV	VOL	VOR
Arsenal Kyiv	—	1–0	0–3	0–1	2–0	1–1	2–1	1–0	1–3	0–0	2–0	5–1	0–0	5–0	8–1	2–1
Chornomorets Odesa	1–3	—	0–1	1–4	3–2	1–1	0–2	1–0	0–1	1–0	0–2	2–1	2–0	2–0	2–0	2–2
Dnipro	0–0	0–0	—	2–2	1–0	2–0	3–0	2–0	4–1	1–0	4–2	1–1	0–3	2–0	2–0	1–0
Dynamo Kyiv	3–1	2–0	1–0	—	2–0	2–0	1–0	4–2	2–0	5–2	5–3	2–0	2–1	4–1	3–1	8–0
Illichivets Mariupol	0–0	2–0	2–0	0–1	—	2–3	2–0	1–1	1–1	1–1	2–1	1–1	2–4	2–0	3–2	4–1
Karpaty Lviv	1–2	2–1	1–0	0–0	1–1	—	0–0	2–0	0–0	1–0	0–1	3–2	2–4	3–1	0–2	3–0
Kryvbas Kryvyi Rih	0–1	2–4	1–1	0–0	2–0	2–1	—	1–0	0–2	0–0	1–0	1–1	0–1	2–1	0–1	2–1
Metalist Kharkiv	1–1	1–0	0–2	0–2	0–1	1–0	2–1	—	0–3	2–1	1–1	0–1	0–1	1–0	3–1	0–0
Metalurh Donetsk	1–2	2–0	1–3	1–0	2–0	1–1	2–1	3–2	—	1–1	2–1	1–0	0–2	2–0	2–1	2–0
Metalurh Zaporizhzhia	0–5	1–2	0–2	0–3	1–1	1–1	2–1	2–0	0–1	—	2–0	2–1	0–1	1–1	1–0	0–1
Obolon Kyiv	0–2	4–1	1–3	1–1	0–0	2–1	0–1	3–1	0–3	2–0	—	2–2	0–1	1–1	1–1	1–0
PFC Oleksandriya	0–0	2–1	0–1	0–2	1–0	0–0	0–0	1–1	0–2	2–1	1–0	—	0–1	1–1	3–2	2–0
Shakhtar Donetsk	3–0	2–0	2–0	1–0	4–2	4–0	1–1	2–0	3–1	2–0	2–1	5–0	—	5–2	1–3	0–0
Tavriya Simferopol	1–0	2–0	3–2	1–2	0–0	1–0	4–2	2–0	0–2	1–1	3–1	3–1	3–3	—	1–1	3–2
Volyn Lutsk	0–1	2–2	4–5	1–0	2–1	0–1	2–0	2–0	1–1	0–2	2–1	1–0	2–0	1–0	—	0–0
Vorskla Poltava	1–1	1–2	2–0	1–2	1–1	3–0	2–1	1–0	0–0	2–0	0–0	2–1	1–2	1–0	0–1	—

Source: uafootball.net.ua
Legend: Blue = home team win; Yellow = draw; Red = away team win.

== Top goal scorers ==
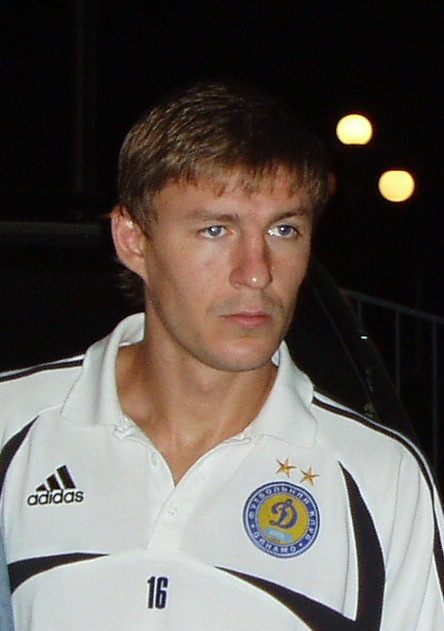
Shatskikh

(Uzbekistan) Maksim Shatskikh	Dynamo Kyiv	22(1)
(Ukraine) Oleksiy Byelik	Shakhtar Donetsk	21
(Ukraine) Oleh Venhlynskyi	Dnipro Dnipropetrovsk	19
(Georgia (country)) Shalva Apkhazava	Arsenal Kyiv	14
(Ukraine) Oleksandr Haidash	Tavriya Simferopol	12
(Ukraine) Vyacheslav Tereschenko	Obolon Kyiv	12(1)
(Brazil) Diogo Rincon	Dynamo Kyiv	10
(Georgia (country)) Vasil Gigiadze	Tavriya Simferopol	10(4)
(Azerbaijan) Samir Aliyev	Volyn Lutsk	9(1)
(Ukraine) Serhiy Zakarlyuka	Metalurh Donetsk	9(1)
(Ukraine) Oleksandr Kosyrin	Chornomorets Odesa	9(2)
