= Andrusw Araujo =

Venezuelan footballer (born 2005)

Personal information
- Full name: Andrusw Alberto Araujo Araque
- Date of birth: 5 June 2003 (age 23)
- Place of birth: Motatán Municipality, Venezuela
- Height: 1.83 m (6 ft 0 in)
- Position: Midfielder

Team information
- Current team: Polissya Zhytomyr
- Number: 22

Youth career
- –2021: Rayo Zuliano

Senior career*
Years	Team	Apps	(Gls)
2021–2025	Rayo Zuliano	85	(1)
2025–2026	Kryvbas Kryvyi Rih	26	(0)
2026–	Polissya Zhytomyr	2	(0)

International career^{‡}
2026–	Venezuela	2	(0)
- * Club domestic league appearances and goals as of 29 August 2026 ‡ National team caps and goals as of 6 October 2026

Andrusw Alberto Araujo Araque (born 5 June 2003) is a Venezuelan professional footballer who plays as a midfielder for Polissya Zhytomyr and the Venezuela national team.

== Early life ==
Araujo was born on 5 June 2003. Born in Motatán Municipality, Venezuela, he is a native of the city.

== Club career ==
As a youth player, Araujo joined the youth academy of Venezuelan side Zulia FC and was promoted to the club's senior team in 2021. With Deportivo Rayo Zuliano made eighty-five league appearances. Following his stint there, he signed for Ukrainian side Kryvbas Kryvyi Rih ahead of the 2025–26 season.

== International career ==
Araujo is a Venezuela international. On 27 March 2026, he debuted for the Venezuela national football team during a 4–1 away friendly win over the Trinidad and Tobago national football team.

== Style of play ==
Araujo plays as a midfielder. Ukrainian news website Sport.ua wrote in 2026 that he "is extremely useful in the defensive midfield when it comes to winning the ball".

== Career statistics ==
=== International ===
As of match played 6 October 2026

Appearances and goals by national team and year
National team	Year	Apps	Goals
Venezuela	2026	2	0
Total		2	0
