= Yaroslav Sydorenko =

Ukrainian footballer (born 1998)

Personal information
- Full name: Yaroslav Olehovych Sydorenko
- Date of birth: 27 August 1998 (age 28)
- Place of birth: Sumy, Ukraine
- Position: Right midfielder

Team information
- Current team: Alians Lypova Dolyna
- Number: 96

Youth career
- 2011–2015: Barsa Sumy

Senior career*
Years	Team	Apps	(Gls)
2015	Barsa Sumy	14	(3)
2016	Spartak-Sumbud Sumy	13	(1)
2017–2018	Ahrobiznes TSK Romny	10	(3)
2018–	Alians Lypova Dolyna	74	(17)
- * Club domestic league appearances and goals as of 26 September 2021

Yaroslav Olehovych Sydorenko (Ukrainian: Ярослав Олегович Сидоренко; born 27 August 1998) is a Ukrainian professional footballer who plays as a right midfielder for Ukrainian club Alians Lypova Dolyna.
