= Viktor Arefyev =

Ukrainian footballer

Personal information
- Full name: Viktor Leonidovych Arefyev
- Date of birth: 23 January 1975 (age 51)
- Place of birth: Horlivka, Ukrainian SSR, Soviet Union
- Position: Forward

Youth career
- 1991: UOR Donetsk

Senior career*
| Years | Team | Apps | (Gls) |
| 1992–1993 | Silur Khartsyzk | 26 | (7) |
| 1994–1999 | Stal Alchevsk | 150 | (33) |
| 1999 | CSKA Kyiv | 10 | (0) |
| 1999 | → CSKA-2 Kyiv | 9 | (3) |
| 2000–2004 | Stal Alchevsk | 119 | (38) |
| 2000–2001 | → Stal-2 Alchevsk | 2 | (0) |
| 2004 | Naftovyk Okhtyrka | 12 | (0) |
| 2005 | Podillya Khmelnytskyi | 3 | (0) |
| 2006 | Olimpik Donetsk | 12 | (4) |
| 2006 | Banants | 13 | (2) |
| 2007–2011 | Olimpik Donetsk | 114 | (38) |
| 2011 | Makiivvuhillya Makiivka | 2 | (0) |
- * Club domestic league appearances and goals

Viktor Leonidovych Arefyev (Ukrainian: Віктор Леонідович Ареф'єв; born 23 January 1975) is a Ukrainian retired professional football forward.

Together with Vasyl Sachko (Volyn Lutsk), Arefyev became the highest scorer when he scored 17 goals for Stal Alchevsk during the 2001–02 Ukrainian First League season.
