= FC Polissya Zhytomyr =

Polissya Zhytomyr
- Full name: Football Club Polissya Zhytomyr
- Founded: 1959 (as Avanhard Zhytomyr); 2016; 10 years ago (as MFC Zhytomyr)
- Dissolved: 2005
- Ground: Tsentralnyi Stadion, Zhytomyr
- Capacity: 5,928
- Owner: Hennadiy Butkevych
- General Director: Volodymyr Zahurskyi
- Manager: Ruslan Rotan
- League: Ukrainian Premier League
- 2025–26: Ukrainian Premier League, 3rd of 16
- Website: polissyafc.com
Home colours	Away colours	Third colours

Football Club Polissya Zhytomyr (Ukrainian: Футбольний клуб «Полісся» Житомир) is a Ukrainian professional football club based in Zhytomyr, Polissya. They play in the Ukrainian Premier League, the top tier of Ukrainian football. The club is a phoenix club that existed from 1959 to 2005.

The original Soviet team of masters became defunct after the 2004–05 season, and for almost a decade, the city was without its professional club, although the Polissya football academy, as a specialized sports school, continued to play at local competitions. The current club was reestablished in 2016.

== History ==
=== Timeline of name changes and creations ===
- 1959–1992: first club (46 seasons)
  - 1959–1960: Avanhard Zhytomyr
  - 1960–1966: Polissya Zhytomyr (Spartak sports society)
  - 1967–1976: Avtomobilist Zhytomyr
  - 1977–1988: Spartak Zhytomyr
  - 1988–1992: Polissya Zhytomyr
  - 1992–1997: Khimik Zhytomyr (factory team)
  - 1997–2005: FC Polissya Zhytomyr (adopted former factory team)
- 2016–present: second club (ongoing)
  - 2016–2017: MFC Zhytomyr
  - 2017–present: FC Polissya Zhytomyr

=== Historical background ===
The club traces its history back to 1959, when the first Zhytomyr "team of masters" (Soviet term for a professional team) was formed and was admitted to the All-Union competitions. However, the team operated before 1959 at the republican level, which was considered amateur. For example, in 1958 Avanhard Zhytomyr became the champion of Zhytomyr Oblast.

The newly formed team of masters, Avanhard Zhytomyr, made their debut in the 1959 Soviet Football Championship, Class B when, on 18 April 1959, they hosted Spartak Minsk (today FC Dinamo Minsk). The Zhytomyr team won the match 1:0. Yuriy Nikitin scored the only goal for the Zhytomyr team midway through the second half at Stadion Dynamo in Zhytomyr. It so happened that the future president of the Ukrainian Association of Football, Viktor Bannikov, also made his professional debut in the game as a goalkeeper for Avanhard. The 1959 Soviet Class B (second tier) consisted of 7 groups; Avanhard played in Group 2. They finished 9th among 15 participants. During their maiden season, on 3 July 1959, Avanhard made their debut at the 1959–60 Soviet Cup, where they were eliminated at the qualification stage by Arsenal Kyiv.

In 1960, the Zhytomyr team of masters was transferred from the Avanhard sports society to the Spartak sports society, yet adopted a region-specific name, Polissya (Polesie, at the All-Union level). Polesie, which means a woodland, is a geographic area located between Ukraine and Belarus. Coincidentally, there was a notable change in the format of the Soviet Union football competitions for Class B (second tier), which was split, creating the RSFSR Class B, the UkrSSR Class B, and the Union Republics Class B. The organization of the football competition in the UkrSSR Class B was entrusted to the Ukrainian Republican Football Federation. The football competitions in the 1960 UkrSSR Class B were composed of 2 parallel groups split geographically, and both winners of the groups contested the republican title, after which the republican champion challenged another Ukrainian team from Class A for promotion. Polissya started their season on 10 April 1960 by visiting Chornomorets Odesa, where they lost 0:2. They finished their second season 7th among 17 group participants.

After the 1962 season, the Soviet football pyramid was reorganized again, and the Class B competition was moved to the third tier. Polissya Zhytomyr, while being among the contenders, was not selected for the second tier. Polissya remained in the Class B (now the third tier) until 1967. Coincidentally, just before the 1967 Class B, Polissya changed their name to Avtomobilist (car owner or car operator), and the same year the team won the republican competitions. It was their first major trophy. Sixteen players were honored with the sports title of Master of Sports. In addition, Polissya qualified for the 1966–67 Soviet Cup for the first time by winning their qualification group. During the tournament proper, the team competed as Avtomobilist and were eliminated in the Round of 64 by Tavriya Simferopol.

The 1967 champions of Ukraine squad:
(first number indicates games played, second - goals scored (or allowed))

- Goalkeepers: Tomash Sytsynskyi (34, -?), Mykhailo Forkash (23, -?).
- Defenders: Valentyn Andryushchenko (23), Petro Bilyi (23), Rostyslav Hordeyev (27, 1), Volodymyr Humenyuk (38, 1), Viktor Kotlyarenko (24, 1), Ishtvan Shtefutsa (36).
- Midfielders: Anatoliy Bohovyk (23, 3), Boris Galoyan (22, 1), Ferents Kokolnyk (41, 2), Ishtvan Shandor (32).
- Forwards: Oleksandr Horelov (42, 18), Valentin Kosov (39, 8), Volodymyr Popov (32, 9).
- Senior coach: Viktor Zhylin

Avtomobilist remained in the second tier not too long. After the 1969 season, there was another reform of the Soviet football pyramid, and the Class A Second Group, where Avtomobilist played, was also moved down the pyramid, becoming the third tier for the 1970 season. Avtomobilist placed 4th during the season and qualified to stay in the second tier; however, Karpaty Lviv, which placed 6th, were spared instead for winning the 1969 Soviet Cup. Avtomobilist also played quite successfully in the 1969 Soviet Cup, reaching the Round of 16, where they were eliminated by CSKA Moscow after a replay when the original match ended in a scoreless draw. During the replay, CSKA beat Avtomobilist 1:0.

From 1970, Avtomobilist remained in the Soviet Second League until 1989, after which another reform of the Soviet football pyramid took place, sending the Zhytomyr team down to the fourth tier. For the first five seasons after playing in the Second League, Avtomobilist came very close to gaining promotion, particularly in 1973 and 1975. During the 1975 Soviet Second League, Avtomobilist placed second behind Kryvbas Kryvyi Rih, trailing only by a point. During that time (1972 to 1976), the Ukrainian Republican Football Federation was conducting a parallel Ukrainian Cup tournament created specifically for Second League Ukrainian clubs in addition to the original, which since 1957 has been organized for amateur-level teams. Avtomobilist became the winner of the inaugural 1972 Ukrainian Cup for the Second League clubs by defeating Shakhtar Donetsk 1:0 in Kyiv, and, two years later they returned to the 1974 final of the competition where they were defeated by Tavriya Simferopol.

Following the dissolution of the Soviet Union, Polissya joined the football competitions in Ukraine and was admitted to the 1992 Persha Liha. They finished the season in the relegation zone. However, the club went bankrupt. Their place in the 1992–93 Ukrainian Second League was granted to the factory team from Zhytomyr, Khimik, which represented the local factory "Khimvolokno". Previously, Khimik Zhytomyr had competed in the KFK competitions and placed 6th in their group during the 1991 season. During the 1992–93 season, Khimik finished second behind Dnipro Cherkasy, tying with them on points, but they received the promotion along with the Cherkasy team. Thus, Zhytomyr regained a professional team, under a different brand, in the second tier just one season later. The factory lasted until 1997, when Khimvolokno disbanded their team, and it was re-registered as a region-sponsored team under the new-old name of Polissya.

After the disastrous season of 2005, it became defunct. However, soon after the reorganization, two clubs were created and were admitted to the Second League for the 2005/06 season – MFK Zhytomyr and FC Zhytychi Zhytomyr. In March 2006, the municipal administration stopped funding for MFK Zhytomyr, and the team was dissolved on 30 April 2006. FC Zhytychi Zhytomyr finished 8th in the Second League'06, but next year they failed to submit their license and stopped their participation on the professional level.

The highest position the club achieved was fourth place in the Persha Liha, twice. Because of this, in 2002, it was awarded to play a play-off match with PFC Olexandria in Kyiv to receive the promotion to the Vyscha Liha. Polissya lost 0:1. Subsequent seasons have brought progressively worse results every year.

In 2005, an attempt to create the municipal club took place on the initiative of Hennadiy Zabrodsky, soon after the dissolution of FC Polissya Zhytomyr. At that time, facing a danger of losing its professional football team, Zhytomyr paradoxically witnessed the creation of two teams in the place of one. The new club was created in place of the existing amateur FC Arsenal Zhytomyr. The creation of the city club was supported by the city's government as part of local elections, which, however, after the city mayor lost, the club, after playing the first half of the season, was dissolved. Some players moved to the regional club OFC Zhytychi Zhytomyr.

=== Current rendition (since 2016) ===
In November 2015, FC Polissia Zhytomyr applied for the 2016–17 Ukrainian Second League. On 23 March 2016, the deputy mayor of Zhytomyr, Matviy Khrenovu, announced on his Facebook that the new director of MFC Zhytomyr became the head of Zhytomyr Rayon Football Federation, Ruslan Pavlyuk.

In March 2017, the club was renamed to FC Polissya Zhytomyr. The club also adopted a new logo with 1959 year of establishment, thus claiming heritage of the original FC Polissya Zhytomyr.

Since 2021, the club has been financed by the BGV Group, which controls a network of ATB-Market retail stores.

In May 2023, FC Polissya Zhytomyr won Ukrainian First League with three rounds left till the end of the tournament, reaching the Ukrainian Premier League for the first time in the club's history. Next year, the club finished 5th in Premier League, which led to the club's first ever participation in European competitions.

== Stadium ==
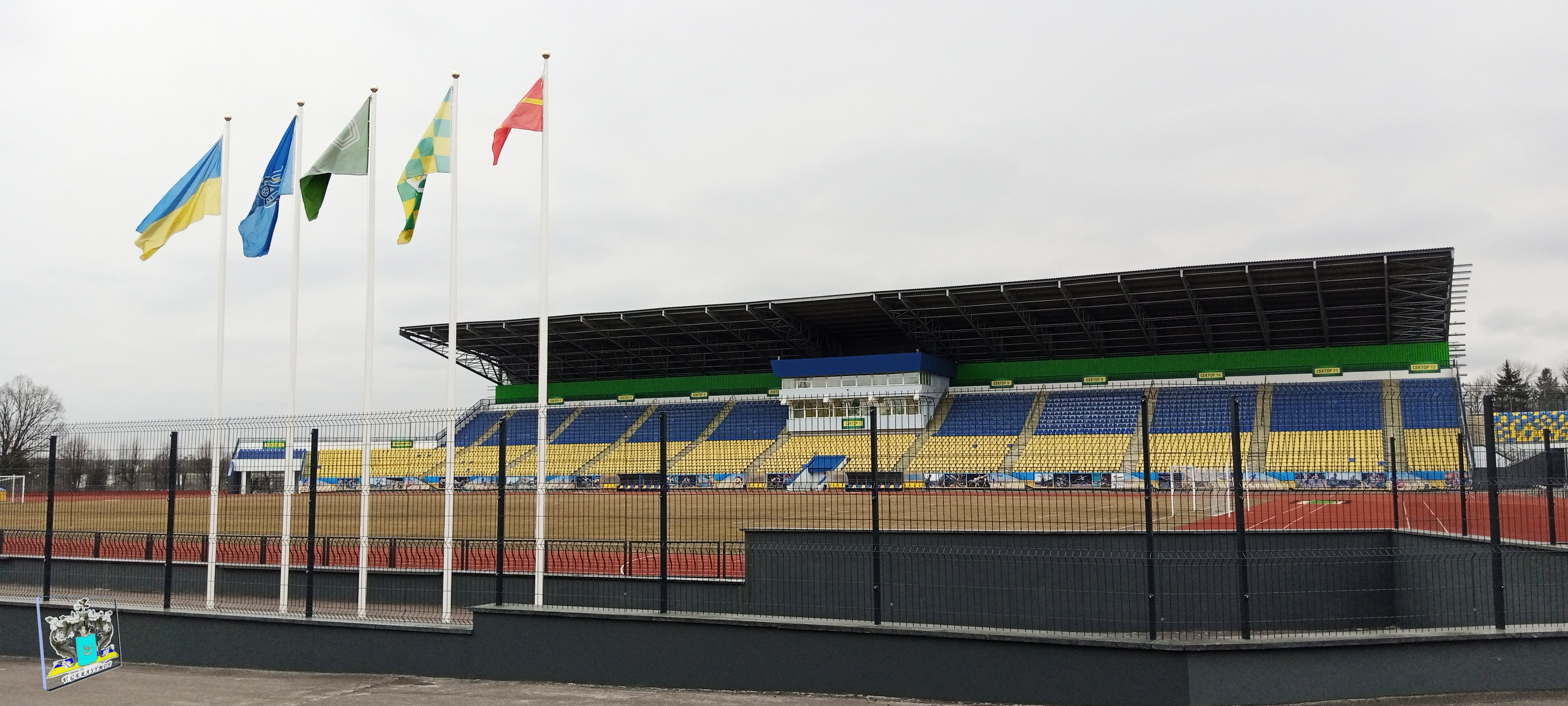
The Tsentralnyi Stadion is the main football arena of Zhytomyr Oblast.

MFC Zhytomyr started to play at Tsentralnyi Stadion (Central Stadium); however, soon, at the stadium, renovations started, and the club moved to smaller Kolos Stadion.

In 2017, the club temporarily moved to Korosten to play at the local Spartak Stadion, which was approved by the Football Federation of Ukraine and Professional Football League.

In March 2021, Polissya returned to Tsentralnyi Stadion, after 16 years of reconstruction.

== Players ==
=== First team squad ===
As of 7 September 2026

Note: Flags indicate national team as defined under FIFA eligibility rules; some limited exceptions apply. Players may hold more than one non-FIFA nationality.

No.	Pos.	Nation	Player
1	GK	UKR	Oleh Kudryk
4	DF	UKR	Mykyta Kravchenko
5	DF	UKR	Eduard Sarapiy
6	MF	CGO	Borel Tomandzoto
7	FW	UKR	Oleksandr Nazarenko
8	MF	UKR	Ruslan Babenko
9	FW	UKR	Oleksandr Filippov
10	MF	UKR	Vladyslav Veleten
11	MF	CPV	Leandro Andrade
14	MF	KOS	Lindon Emërllahu
15	DF	UKR	Bohdan Mykhaylichenko
16	MF	KOS	Ilir Krasniqi
18	MF	UKR	Oleksandr Andriyevskyi
19	MF	UKR	Volodymyr Shepelyev

No.	Pos.	Nation	Player
22	MF	VEN	Andrusw Araujo
23	GK	UKR	Yevhen Volynets
27	MF	UKR	Oleh Fedor
28	FW	CGO	Béni Makouana
30	MF	UKR	Bohdan Lyednyev
31	DF	GEO	Giorgi Maisuradze
34	DF	BRA	João Vialle
38	MF	UKR	Yaroslav Karaman
44	DF	UKR	Serhiy Chobotenko (captain)
45	FW	UKR	Maksym Braharu
55	DF	UKR	Borys Krushynskyi
60	MF	UKR	Maksym Melnychenko
77	GK	UKR	Nazar Makarenko
89	FW	UKR	Mykola Hayduchyk
95	FW	UKR	Ihor Krasnopir

=== Other players under contract ===
Note: Flags indicate national team as defined under FIFA eligibility rules; some limited exceptions apply. Players may hold more than one non-FIFA nationality.

No.	Pos.	Nation	Player
—	MF	UKR	Yevheniy Mykytyuk

=== Out on loan ===
Note: Flags indicate national team as defined under FIFA eligibility rules; some limited exceptions apply. Players may hold more than one non-FIFA nationality.

No.	Pos.	Nation	Player
—	GK	UKR	Heorhiy Bushchan (at Dynamo Kyiv until 30 June 2027)
—	MF	AZE	Emil Mustafayev (at (Azerbaijan) Sumgayit FK until 30 June 2026)

No.	Pos.	Nation	Player
—	FW	POR	André Gonçalves (at Veres Rivne until 30 June 2026)

== International players ==
Had international caps for their respective countries. Players whose name is listed in bold represented their countries while playing for Polissya Zhytomyr.

Ukraine

- (Ukraine) Oleksandr Andriyevskyi
- (Ukraine) Pylyp Budkivskyi
- (Ukraine) Heorhiy Bushchan
- (Ukraine) **Oleksiy Hutsulyak**
- (Ukraine) Yuriy Kolomoyets
- (Ukraine) Oleksandr Kovpak
- (Ukraine) **Bohdan Mykhaylichenko**
- (Ukraine) Serhiy Nahornyak
- (Ukraine) **Oleksandr Nazarenko**
- (Ukraine) Ivan Petryak
- (Ukraine) Adrian Pukanych
- (Ukraine) **Eduard Sarapiy**
- (Ukraine) Artem Shabanov
- (Ukraine) Volodymyr Shepelyev
- (Ukraine) **Vladyslav Veleten**
- (Ukraine) Dmytro Yakovenko

Soviet Union

- (Soviet Union) Mykhaylo Forkash
- (Soviet Union) Valeri Kopiy
- (Soviet Union) Anatoliy Puzach
- (Soviet Union) Anatoliy Shepel

Europe

- (Albania) **Andi Hadroj**
- (Azerbaijan) **Emil Mustafayev**
- (Kazakhstan) Sergey Kostyuk
- (Kosovo) **Lindon Emërllahu**
- (Kosovo) **Ilir Krasniqi**

Africa

- (Cape Verde) Leandro Andrade
- (Republic of the Congo) **Béni Makouana**

North America

- (Haiti) Yassin Fortuné

South America

- (Venezuela) Andrusw Araujo

== Coaches and administration ==
Administration	Coaching (senior team)	Coaching (U-19 team)
President – (Ukraine) Hennadiy Butkevych; General director – (Ukraine) Volodymyr Zahurskyi; Financial director – (Ukraine) Anna Petrushenko; Vice-president – (Belarus) Alyaksandr Khatskevich; Sporting director – (Ukraine) Vyacheslav Shevchuk; Marketing director – (Ukraine) Oleksandr Denysov	Head coach – (Ukraine) Ruslan Rotan; Assistant manager – (Ukraine) Serhiy Kravchenko; Assistant manager – (Ukraine) Serhiy Symonenko; Assistant manager – (Ukraine) Oleksiy Antonov; Goalkeeping coach – (Ukraine) Volodymyr Tymenko; Fitness coach – (Ukraine) Volodymyr Deul; Fitness coach – (Ukraine) Yevhen Baryshnikov	Senior coach – (Ukraine) Andriy Hitchenko; Assistant coach – (Ukraine) Serhiy Pinchuk; Assistant coach – vacant; Goalkeeping coach – (Ukraine) Kyrylo Zlotar; Fitness coach – (Ukraine) Oleksiy Hulin

== Managers ==
- (Soviet Union) Andriy Biba (1980)
- (Ukraine) Andriy Biba (1995 – 1996)
- (Ukraine) Anatoliy Zayayev (2000)
- (Ukraine) Ihor Levytskyi (16 March 2016 – 24 August 2017)
- (Ukraine) Eduard Khavrov (25 August 2017 – 20 November 2017)
- (Ukraine) Volodymyr Mazyar (22 November 2017 – 21 December 2017)
- (Ukraine) Oleksandr Pryzetko (27 December 2017 – 21 August 2018)
- (Ukraine) Anatoliy Bezsmertnyi (21 August 2018 – 4 July 2020)
- (Ukraine) Serhiy Shyshchenko (7 July 2020 – 13 June 2021)
- (Ukraine) Yuriy Kalitvintsev (13 June 2021 – 11 March 2024)
- (Ukraine) Serhiy Shyshchenko (caretaker) (11 March 2024 – 26 May 2024)
- (Ukraine) Imad Ashur (26 May 2024 – 12 May 2025)
- (Ukraine) Oleksandr Maksymov (caretaker) (12 May 2025 – 31 May 2025)
- (Ukraine) Ruslan Rotan (1 June 2025 – present)

== Chairmen ==
- Ruslan Pavlyuk, 2016–2017
- Vitaliy Lyaskovskyi, 2017–present

== Logos and emblems ==
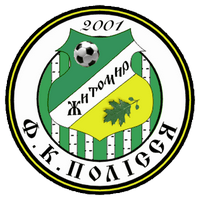
Logo in 2001

== League and cup history ==
=== Soviet Union (Ukrainian SSR) ===
Season	Div.	Pos.	Pl.	W	D	L	GS	GA	P	Domestic Cup	Europe		Notes
Avanhard Zhytomyr
1958	Rep "2"	**6**/_{8}	13	3	5	5	18	22	11	1/16 finals			**Admitted to Class B**
1959	2nd "2"	**9**/_{15}	28	9	9	10	41	34	27		SU	Conference Final	
Polissia Zhytomyr
1960	2nd "1"	**7**/_{17}	32	16	6	10	58	38	38				
1960	2nd "1"	won relegation playoff over Shakhtar Korostyshiv											
1961	2nd "1"	**6**/_{18}	34	13	8	13	47	41	34		SU	Conference 1/2 finals	to 11th place playoff
1961	2nd "1"	lost two-leg playoff to Shakhtar Horlivka											placed 12th
1961	2nd "1"	won relegation playoff over Chervona Zirka Malyn											placed 12th
1962	2nd "1"	**2**/_{13}	24	14	3	7	33	24	31		SU	Conference 1/8 finals	to 1st place group
1962	2nd "1"	**5**/_{6}	10	3	2	5	10	15	8		SU	Conference 1/8 finals	placed 5th / **Relegated**
1963	3rd "1"	**4**/_{20}	38	21	7	10	58	36	49		SU	Conference 1/2 finals	to 7th place playoff
1963	3rd "1"	won two-leg playoff over Burevisnyk Melitopol											placed 7th
1964	3rd "1"	**1**/_{16}	30	18	8	4	32	11	44		SU	Conference 1/4 finals	to 1st place group
1964	3rd "1"	**3**/_{6}	10	4	3	3	9	7	11		SU	Conference 1/4 finals	placed 3rd
1965	3rd "2"	**8**/_{16}	30	12	5	13	34	33	29		SU	Conference 1/8 finals	to 19th place group
1965	3rd "2"	**4**/_{6}	10	3	4	3	6	8	10		SU	Conference 1/8 finals	placed 22nd
1966	3rd "1"	**10**/_{20}	38	14	11	13	33	27	39				to 19th place playoff
1966	3rd "1"	lost two-leg playoff to Bukovyna Chernivtsi											placed 20th
Avtomobilist Zhytomyr
1967	3rd "1"	**1**/_{21}	40	23	13	4	45	12	59		SU	1/32 finals	to Final group
1967	3rd "1"	**1**/_{6}	5	4	1	0	7	2	9		SU	1/32 finals	Champions / **Promoted**
1968	2nd "1"	**4**/_{21}	40	17	16	7	38	19	50		SU	1/32 finals	
1969	2nd "3"	**4**/_{22}	42	21	9	12	57	31	51		SU	1/8 finals	**Relegated**
1970	3rd	**3**/_{22}	42	20	15	7	61	27	55		SU	1/16 finals	
1971	3rd	**3**/_{26}	50	25	15	10	58	30	65				
1972	3rd	**8**/_{24}	46	19	15	12	44	31	53	Winner			
1973	3rd	**2**/_{23}	44	25	3/(2)	14	62	36	53	1/4 finals			
1974	3rd	**8**/_{20}	38	15	11	12	50	39	41	Finalist			
1975	3rd	**2**/_{17}	32	13	14	5	41	21	40	1/16 finals			
1976	3rd	**6**/_{20}	38	14	14	10	44	31	42	1/2 finals			
Spartak Zhytomyr
1977	3rd	**8**/_{23}	44	18	14	12	51	34	50				
1978	3rd	**10**/_{23}	44	19	7	18	50	40	45				
1979	3rd	**6**/_{24}	46	22	12	12	57	41	56				
1980	3rd	**7**/_{23}	44	17	17	10	55	43	51				
1981	3rd	**11**/_{23}	44	15	13	16	38	47	43				
1982	3rd	**7**/_{24}	46	23	8	15	68	46	54				
1983	3rd	**7**/_{26}	50	21	14	15	66	50	56				
1984	3rd	**9**/_{13}	24	10	6	8	32	29	26				First stage Group 1
1984	3rd	**4**/_{14}	38	14	11	13	50	48	39				Consolation tournament
1985	3rd	**14**/_{14}	26	4	5	17	17	40	13				First stage Group 1
1985	3rd	**12**/_{14}	40	9	13	18	31	50	31				Consolation tournament
1986	3rd	**9**/_{14}	26	8	8	10	27	29	24				First stage Group 2
1986	3rd	**6**/_{14}	40	14	10	16	46	48	38				Consolation tournament
1987	3rd	**12**/_{27}	52	22	12	18	72	59	56				
1988	3rd	**13**/_{26}	50	18	15	17	55	58	51				
Polissya Zhytomyr
1989	3rd	**15**/_{27}	52	16	16	20	59	62	48				Relegated
1990	4th Zone 1	**4**/_{19}	50	28	13	9	67	38	69	Winner			
1991	4th Zone 1	**10**/_{26}	50	22	7	21	64	66	51	1/8 finals			fall of the Soviet Union

=== Ukraine ===
Season	Div.	Pos.	Pl.	W	D	L	GS	GA	P	Domestic Cup	Europe	Notes
Polissia Zhytomyr
1992	2nd Gr. "A"	**10**/_{14}	26	10	5	11	30	31	25			Relegated
Khimik Zhytomyr
1992–93	3rd	**2**/_{18}	34	20	9	5	53	29	49			Promoted
1993–94	2nd	**10**/_{20}	38	14	8	16	39	47	36			
1994–95	2nd	**4**/_{22}	42	20	15	7	61	37	75			
1995–96	2nd	**14**/_{22}	42	16	10	16	55	57	58			
1996–97	2nd	**18**/_{24}	46	15	10	21	44	61	55			
Polissya Zhytomyr
1997–98	2nd	**6**/_{22}	42	21	5	16	58	64	68			
1998–99	2nd	**12**/_{20}	38	15	7	16	40	55	52			
1999–00	2nd	**15**/_{18}	34	11	7	16	36	51	40			Relegated
2000–01	3rd	**1**/_{16}	30	22	4	4	61	17	70			Promoted
2001–02	2nd	**4**/_{18}	34	17	10	7	43	33	58			Lost promotion play-offs
2002–03	2nd	**11**/_{18}	34	12	7	15	30	38	43			
2003–04	2nd	**18**/_{18}	34	3	7	24	22	67	16			Avoided relegation
2004–05	2nd	**18**/_{18}	34	0	2	32	5	39	2			withdrew Relegated

==== Zhytychi Zhytomyr (2005–2006) ====
Season	Div.	Pos.	Pl.	W	D	L	GS	GA	P	Domestic Cup	Europe	Notes
2005–06	3rd	**8**/_{16}	28	10	11	7	38	34	**41**			withdrew

==== Polissya Zhytomyr (revived) ====
Season	Div.	Pos.	Pl.	W	D	L	GS	GA	P	Domestic Cup	Other		Notes
MFC Zhytomyr
2016	**4th** (Amatorska Liha)	**3**/4	6	3	1	2	6	5	**10**				Group 1
2016–17	**4th** (Amatorska Liha)	**6**/12	20	7	5	8	13	18	**26**		UAC	1/16 finals	Group 2
2016–17	**4th** (Amatorska Liha)	**6**/12	20	7	5	8	13	18	**26**		UAC	1/16 finals	**Admitted to SL**
Polissia Zhytomyr
2017–18	**3rd** "A" (Druha Liha)	**8**/10	27	9	3	15	31	44	**30**	1/32 finals			
2018–19	**3rd** "A" (Druha Liha)	**3**/10	27	13	6	8	23	21	**45**	1/64 finals			
2019–20	**3rd** "A" (Druha Liha)	**2**/11	20	11	6	3	28	11	**39**	1/64 finals			**Promoted**
2020–21	**2nd** (Persha Liha)	**11**/16	30	9	8	13	32	37	**35**	1/16 finals			
2021–22 was terminated	**2nd** (Persha Liha)	**9**/16	18	7	4	7	21	17	**25**	1/32 finals			began on 24.02.2022 Russian invasion of Ukraine
2022–23	**2nd**"A"(Persha Liha)	**1**/8	14	13	1	0	34	6	**40**	Not played			to Promotion group
2022–23	**2nd**"A"(Persha Liha)	**1**/8	14	10	2	2	25	9	**32**	Not played			**Promoted**
2023–24	**1st**(Premier Liha)	**5**	30	14	8	8	39	30	**50**	1/2 finals			
2024-25	**1st**(Premier Liha)	**4**	30	12	12	6	38	28	**48**	1/2 finals	2024–25 UEFA Conference League	Second qualifying round	
2025-26	**1st**(Premier Liha)	**3**	30	18	5	7	51	21	**59**	1/16 finals	2025–26 UEFA Conference League	Play-off round	
2026-27	**1st**(Premier Liha)	1	10	8	1	1	23	8	25	1/4 finals	2026–27 UEFA Conference League	Second qualifying round	

== European record ==
Polissya Zhytomyr has participated in European competition since 2024, playing its first game against Olimpija Ljubljana in the 2024–25 UEFA Conference League. Their first win Polissya obtained in an away game against FC Santa Coloma, which was their fourth game at European level.

=== Overall record ===
Competition	Played	Won	Draw	Lost	GF	GA	GD	Win%
UEFA Conference League	10	2	1	7	16	20	−4	20.00
Total	**10**	**2**	**1**	**7**	**16**	**20**	**−4**	**20.00**

Season	Competition	Round	Opposition	Neitral (~~Home~~)	Away	Aggregate
2024–25	Conference League	Second qualifying round	(Slovenia) Olimpija Ljubljana	1–2 Gl	0–2	**1–4**
2025−26	Conference League	Second qualifying round	(Andorra) FC Santa Coloma	1–2 Pr	4–1	**5–3**
2025−26	Conference League	Third qualifying round	(Hungary) Paks	3–0 Pr	1–2	**4–2**
2025−26	Conference League	Play-off round	(Italy) Fiorentina	0–3 Pr	2–3	**2–6**
2026−27	Conference League	Second qualifying round	(Denmark) Copenhagen	3–3 Ks	1–2	**4–5**

Note: Gl - Gliwice, Poland; Pr - Prešov, Slovakia, Ks - Košice, Slovakia.

== Awards ==
- **Ukrainian First League**
  - Winners (1): 2022–23
- **Football Championship of the Ukrainian SSR**
  - Winners (1): 1967
  - Runners up (2): 1973, 1975
- **Football Cup of the Ukrainian SSR** [among the Second League teams] (2)
  - Winners (2): 1972, 1990
  - Runners up (1): 1974
- **Zhytomyr Oblast**
  - Winners (1): 1958

== Players records ==
Most appearances for the club (top 10)
Place	Footballer	Games	Years in club
1.	Andriy Zheltonosov	514	1981–1983, 1985–1997
2.	Volodymyr Shyshkov	471	1974, 1978, 1981–1993
3.	Stefan Baran	457	1981–1992
4.	Yuriy Strykharchuk	391	1982–1985, 1987–1992
5.	Serhiy Yermakov	361	1977–1987
6.	Mykola Batyuta	348	1969, 1971, 1973–1981
7.	Ihor Talko	340	1977, 1980–1983, 1989–1992, 1993
8.	Vitaliy Horbach	305	1969–1976
9.	Ihor Rutkovskyi	298	1981–1983, 1986–1995
10.	Yuriy Leonov	292	1982–1983, 1986–1991, 1992–1994, 1997–1998

Most goals for the club
Place	Footballer	Goals	Years in club
1.	Volodymyr Shyshkov	192	1974, 1978, 1981–1993
2.	Pavlo Parshyn	82	1998–2004
3.	Yuriy Leonov	68	1982–1983, 1986–1991, 1992–1994, 1997–1998
4.	Yevhen Naumov	66	1974–1981
5.	Stefan Baran	59	1981–1992
6.	Valeriy Sofilkanych	58	1993–2002
7.	Ihor Talko	54	1977, 1980–1983, 1989–1992, 1993
8.	Yuriy Nesmiyan	49	1970–1972
9.	Anatoliy Lukashenko	49	1985, 1988–1995, 1999
10.	Mykola Vasyutin	48	1969–1976

== Reserves and the Academy ==
=== SDYuShOR Polissya ===
Three years after FC Polissya was dissolved, in 2008, the club fielded its academy team at the national level, playing among amateurs.

Season	Div.	Pos.	Pl.	W	D	L	GS	GA	P	Domestic Cup	Europe	Notes
2008	4th	**2**	8	5	0	3	11	9	**15**			
regional competitions

=== Polissya-2 ===
In 2016, FC Polissya was revived, and several years later, in 2024, the club entered their second team, Polissya-2, in the Ukrainian Second League (third tier).

Season	Div.	Pos.	Pl.	W	D	L	GS	GA	P	Ukrainian Cup	Europe		Notes
2024–25	**3rd** (Second League "A")	**5**_{/10}	18	9	2	7	33	21	**29**	-	-	-	-
2025–26	**3rd** (Second League "A")	**2**_{/11}	30	18	9	3	69	22	**63**	-	-	-	**Promoted to Ukrainian First League**
2026–27	**2nd** (First League)	15_{/16}	4	0	2	2	5	7	2	-	-	-	TBD

==== Coaches ====
- 2024–2025 Kishan Hautam
- 2025–present Oleksandr Maksymov

=== Polissya U-19 ===
The club has their under-19 team, which plays in national competitions for under-19 teams. The team has participated in competitions since 2016.

Season	Div.	Pos.	Pl.	W	D	L	GS	GA	P	Other	Coach	Notes
MFC Zhytomyr
2016–17	**2nd** (PFL under-19)	**8**/_{10}	18	4	3	11	12	36	15			
Polissya Zhytomyr
2017–18	**2nd** (PFL under-19)	**10**/_{10}	18	1	6	11	12	38	9			
2018–19	**2nd** (PFL under-19)	**11**/_{12}	22	5	3	14	10	30	18			
2019–20	**2nd** (PFL under-19)	**3**/_{10}	9	5	1	3	18	12	16			
2020–21	**2nd** (PFL under-19)	**11**/_{12}	17	12	1	4	40	19	37			
2021–22	**2nd** (PFL under-19)	**6**/_{10}	8	2	3	3	14	10	9			
2022–23	no league competition due to war											**Promotion to UPL**
2023–24	**1st** (UPL under-19)	**5**/_{16}	30	13	10	7	49	36	49			
2024–25	**1st** (UPL under-19)	**7**/_{16}	30	11	11	8	54	35	44			
2025–26	**1st** (UPL National League)	**5**/_{16}	30	15	9	6	39	24	54			
2026–27	**1st** (UAF National League)											
