= Mykhaylo Forkash =

Ukrainian and Soviet footballer

Personal information
- Full name: Mykhaylo Mykhaylovych Forkash
- Date of birth: 6 July 1948
- Place of birth: Uzhhorod, USSR
- Date of death: 30 September 2011 (aged 63)
- Height: 1.70 m (5 ft 7 in)
- Position: Goalkeeper

Senior career*
Years	Team	Apps	(Gls)
1968–1969	Avtomobilist Zhytomyr	47	(0)
1970–1974	Zorya Voroshylovhrad	62	(0)
1975	SC Lutsk		
1975	FC SKA Rostov-on-Don	12	(0)
1976	Zorya Voroshylovhrad	3	(0)

International career
1972	Soviet Union	1	(0)
- * Club domestic league appearances and goals

Mykhaylo Mykhaylovych Forkash (Ukrainian: Михайло Михайлович Форкаш, Russian: Михаил Михайлович Форкаш; 6 July 1948 – 30 September 2011) was a Ukrainian and Soviet football player.

== Honours ==
- Ukrainian championship winner: 1967.
- Soviet Top League winner: 1972.

== International career ==
Forkash played his only game for USSR on 6 July 1972 in a friendly against Portugal.
