= Pavlo Parshyn =

Ukrainian footballer

Personal information
- Full name: Pavlo Anatoliyovych Parshyn
- Date of birth: 5 August 1975 (age 51)
- Place of birth: Zhytomyr, Soviet Union
- Position: Forward

Senior career*
Years	Team	Apps	(Gls)
1992–94	Dynamo Kyiv	0	(0)
1992–94	Dynamo-2 Kyiv	60	(9)
1995–97	Nyva Vinnytsia	58	(2)
1997	Metalurh Nikopol	19	(5)
1998–00	Polissya Zhytomyr	87	(38)
2000	Prykarpattia Ivano-Frankivsk	10	(0)
2000	→Chornohora Ivano-Frankivsk	2	(0)
2001–04	Polissya Zhytomyr	131	(44)
2005	MFC Mykolaiv	21	(2)
2006	Hirnyk Kryvyi Rih	3	(0)
2006	Metalurh Malyn	3	(0)
2008	SSSOR Polissia Zhytomyr	3	(0)

International career
1990s	Ukraine U-18		
- * Club domestic league appearances and goals

Pavlo Parshyn (Ukrainian: Павло Анатолійович Паршин; born 5 August 1975, Soviet Union) is a retired professional Ukrainian football forward.

Parshyn became the highest scorer when he scored 17 goals for Polissya Zhytomyr during the 1999–2000 Ukrainian First League season.

In 1990s he was a member of the Ukraine national under-18 football team and came out on substitution for Andriy Shevchenko in home game against the Netherlands on 26 April 1994.
