= 2023–24 Ukrainian First League U–19 Championship =

Ukrainian First League U-19 Championship
- Season: 2023-24
- Champions: Dynamo Kyiv

The 2023-24 Ukrainian First League U–19 Championship was the seventh season of the Ukrainian Junior Under 19 Championship in First League. The competition involved participation of several junior teams of the Professional Football League of Ukraine as well as some other football academies.

== Teams ==
- Debut: Dynamo Kyiv, KDYuSSh Shchaslyve, Inhulets Petrove, MDYuSSh Dnipro, Vostok Kharkiv, DYuSSh-2 Dnipro, Kamianske-2023, SKhI Uzhhorod, Pokrova Lviv, Varatyk Kolomyia
- Withdrawn: Liubomyr Stavyshche, FA Arsenal Kyiv, KDYuSSh Chempion Kyiv, Zmina-Obolon Kyiv, CS Favoryt Boryspil, DYuSSh 1 Kyiv, Maister Miacha Kharkiv, Vorskla Poltava, KhFKS Kharkiv, SC Kramatorsk, Barsa Sumy, Koledzh im. Bubky Bakhmut, Avanhard Lozova, Kryvbas Kryvyi Rih, Penuel Kryvyi Rih, Chornomorets Odesa, Polissia Zhytomyr, Dnipro Cherkasy, Khadzhybei Usatove, Zirka Kropyvnytskyi, DYuSSh Kherson, Olimpik Kropyvnytskyi, FC Kulykiv, DYuSSh-3 Prykarpattia Ivano-Frankivsk, Krystal Chortkiv, Halychyna Lviv, FC Uhornyky, FSC Chernivtsi
- Note: Dynamo Kyiv already have under-19 team in UPL.

== Group stage ==
=== Group 1 ===
Pos	Team	Pld	W	D	L	GF	GA	GD	Pts
1	Dynamo Kyiv	13	13	0	0	61	5	+56	39
2	Nika Kyiv	13	7	3	3	31	17	+14	24
3	Dinaz Vyshhorod	13	7	2	4	26	20	+6	23
4	Atletyk Odesa	13	7	1	5	21	19	+2	22
5	DYuSSh 26 Kyiv	13	5	1	7	19	32	−13	16
6	KDYuSSh Shchaslyve	13	4	1	8	24	40	−16	13
7	KDYuSSh 15 Kyiv	13	3	1	9	23	40	−17	10
8	imeni Horpynka Poltava	13	0	3	10	12	44	−32	3

Updated to match(es) played on 13 May 2024. Source: https://duflu.org.ua/pervaya-lyga/
Rules for classification: 1) points 2) wins 4) head-to-head points 5) head-to-head wins 6) head-to-head goal difference 7) head-to-head goals scored 8) goals difference 9) goals scored 10) lesser number of points for cautions and ejections (1– caution; 3– ejection) 11) draw of lots

=== Top goalscorers ===
As of

Rank	Scorer	Goals (Pen.)	Team

=== Group 2 ===
Pos	Team	Pld	W	D	L	GF	GA	GD	Pts
1	Inhulets Petrove	12	10	1	1	49	6	+43	31
2	DYuSSh-1 Kryvbas-84 Kryvyi Rih	12	8	1	3	34	14	+20	25
3	MDYuSSh Dnipro	12	6	0	6	19	24	−5	18
4	Vostok Kharkiv	6	2	0	4	16	26	−10	6
5	Kamianske-2023	6	2	0	4	7	23	−16	6
6	OKKO-2020 Kharkiv	6	1	2	3	7	13	−6	5
7	DYuSSh-2 Dnipro	12	1	2	9	15	41	−26	5

Source: https://duflu.org.ua/pervaya-lyga/
Rules for classification: 1) points 2) wins 4) head-to-head points 5) head-to-head wins 6) head-to-head goal difference 7) head-to-head goals scored 8) goals difference 9) goals scored 10) lesser number of points for cautions and ejections (1– caution; 3– ejection) 11) draw of lots

=== Top goalscorers ===
As of

Rank	Scorer	Goals (Pen.)	Team

=== Group 3 ===
Pos	Team	Pld	W	D	L	GF	GA	GD	Pts
1	Nyva Vinnytsia	14	9	3	2	50	11	+39	30
2	Podillia Khmelnytskyi	14	9	2	3	36	11	+25	29
3	SKhI Uzhhorod	14	8	2	4	39	20	+19	26
4	Pokrova Lviv	14	5	3	6	37	25	+12	18
5	K3 Bukovyna Chernivtsi	14	6	0	8	34	21	+13	18
6	Varatyk Kolomyia	14	0	0	14	2	110	−108	0

Updated to match(es) played on 13 May 2024. Source: https://duflu.org.ua/pervaya-lyga/
Rules for classification: 1) points 2) wins 4) head-to-head points 5) head-to-head wins 6) head-to-head goal difference 7) head-to-head goals scored 8) goals difference 9) goals scored 10) lesser number of points for cautions and ejections (1– caution; 3– ejection) 11) draw of lots

=== Top goalscorers ===
As of

Rank	Scorer	Goals (Pen.)	Team

== Finals ==
=== Quarterfinals ===
Team 1	Agg.	Team 2	1st leg	2nd leg
SKhI Uzhhorod	1–6	Dynamo Kyiv	0–0	1–6
Dinaz Vyshhorod	0–3	Nyva Vinnytsia	0–0	0–3
Podillia Khmelnytskyi	3–5	Inhulets Petrove	2–1	1–4
Nika Kyiv	2–3	Kryvbas-84 Kryvyi Rih	0–1	2–2

=== Four teams tournament ===
The final tournament took place in Shchaslyve (Kyiv Oblast) on June 7-9, 2024.

==== Semifinals ====
Team 1	Score	Team 2
Inhulets Petrove	0–5	Dynamo Kyiv
Nyva Vinnytsia	7–0	Kryvbas-84 Kryvyi Rih

==== Game for 3rd place ====
Team 1	Score	Team 2
Kryvbas-84 Kryvyi Rih	1–6	Inhulets Petrove

==== Finals ====
Team 1	Score	Team 2
Dynamo Kyiv	2–0	Nyva Vinnytsia

== See also ==
- 2023-24 Ukrainian First League
- 2023-24 Ukrainian Second League
