= 2021–22 Ukrainian First League U-19 Championship =

Ukrainian First League U-19 Championship
- Season: 2021-22

The 2021–22 Ukrainian First League U–19 Championship was the sixth season of the Ukrainian Junior Under 19 Championship in First League. The competition involved participation of several junior teams of the Professional Football League of Ukraine as well as some other football academies.

== Teams ==
- Debut: Nika Kyiv, CS Favoryt Boryspil, FC Vorskla Poltava (2), im. Horpynka Poltava, Avanhard Lozova, Khadzhybei Usatove, Penuel Kryvyi Rih, Chornomorets Odesa (2), Zirka Kropyvnytskyi, FC Kulykiv, Halychyna Lviv, FC Uhornyky, FSC Chernivtsi
- Withdrawn: Nyva Vinnytsia, Nika Ivano-Frankivsk, Hirnyk Novoyavorivsk, Lokomotyv Kyiv, Skailark Kyiv, Bila Tserkva, Yednist Kyiv, Zoria Myronivshchyny, Metalurh Zaporizhzhia, Enerhiya Dnipro, Kobra Kharkiv, Lider Dnipro, OKKO Kharkiv
- Note: Vorskla Poltava, Chornomorets Odesa already have under-19 teams in UPL.

== Group stage ==
=== Group 1 ===
| Pos | Team | Pld | W | D | L | GF | GA | GD | Pts |
|---|---|---|---|---|---|---|---|---|---|
| 1 | Liubomyr Stavyshche | 8 | 7 | 1 | 0 | 31 | 8 | +23 | 22 |
| 2 | FA Arsenal Kyiv | 8 | 6 | 1 | 1 | 25 | 8 | +17 | 19 |
| 3 | KDYuSSh 15 Kyiv | 8 | 4 | 2 | 2 | 23 | 12 | +11 | 14 |
| 4 | Chempion Kyiv | 8 | 3 | 2 | 3 | 10 | 15 | −5 | 11 |
| 5 | DYuSSh 26 Kyiv | 8 | 3 | 2 | 3 | 15 | 25 | −10 | 11 |
| 6 | Polissia Zhytomyr | 8 | 2 | 3 | 3 | 14 | 10 | +4 | 9 |
| 7 | Nika Kyiv | 8 | 2 | 2 | 4 | 11 | 24 | −13 | 8 |
| 8 | Zmina-Obolon Kyiv | 8 | 1 | 4 | 3 | 17 | 21 | −4 | 7 |
| 9 | CS Favoryt Boryspil | 8 | 1 | 2 | 5 | 7 | 20 | −13 | 5 |
| 10 | DYuSSh 1 Kyiv | 8 | 0 | 3 | 5 | 11 | 21 | −10 | 3 |

Source: https://duflu.org.ua/pervaya-lyga/
Rules for classification: 1) points 2) wins 4) head-to-head points 5) head-to-head wins 6) head-to-head goal difference 7) head-to-head goals scored 8) goals difference 9) goals scored 10) lesser number of points for cautions and ejections (1– caution; 3– ejection) 11) draw of lots

=== Top goalscorers ===
As of

| Rank | Scorer | Goals (Pen.) | Team |

=== Group 2 ===
| Pos | Team | Pld | W | D | L | GF | GA | GD | Pts |
|---|---|---|---|---|---|---|---|---|---|
| 1 | DYuSSh-1 Kryvbas-84 Kryvyi Rih | 8 | 6 | 1 | 1 | 20 | 7 | +13 | 19 (Note: Head-to-head points: Kryvbas-84 3; Vorskla 0) |
| 2 | FC Vorskla Poltava | 8 | 6 | 1 | 1 | 16 | 4 | +12 | 19 |
| 3 | Maister Miacha Kharkiv | 8 | 5 | 1 | 2 | 19 | 6 | +13 | 16 |
| 4 | FA Kryvbas Kryvyi Rih | 8 | 5 | 0 | 3 | 16 | 8 | +8 | 15 |
| 5 | KhFKS Kharkiv | 8 | 4 | 2 | 2 | 10 | 8 | +2 | 14 |
| 6 | SC Kramatorsk | 8 | 4 | 0 | 4 | 18 | 16 | +2 | 12 |
| 7 | FC Barsa Sumy | 8 | 2 | 2 | 4 | 11 | 19 | −8 | 8 |
| 8 | DYuSSh im. Horpynka Poltava | 8 | 2 | 0 | 6 | 17 | 20 | −3 | 6 (Note: Head-to-head points: Horpynka 3; Bubky 0) |
| 9 | Koledzh im. Bubky Bakhmut | 8 | 2 | 0 | 6 | 5 | 22 | −17 | 6 |
| 10 | Avanhard Lozova | 8 | 0 | 1 | 7 | 5 | 27 | −22 | 1 |

Source: https://duflu.org.ua/pervaya-lyga/
Rules for classification: 1) points 2) wins 4) head-to-head points 5) head-to-head wins 6) head-to-head goal difference 7) head-to-head goals scored 8) goals difference 9) goals scored 10) lesser number of points for cautions and ejections (1– caution; 3– ejection) 11) draw of lots

=== Top goalscorers ===
As of

| Rank | Scorer | Goals (Pen.) | Team |

=== Group 3 ===
| Pos | Team | Pld | W | D | L | GF | GA | GD | Pts |
|---|---|---|---|---|---|---|---|---|---|
| 1 | Penuel Kryvyi Rih | 7 | 4 | 2 | 1 | 7 | 3 | +4 | 14 (Note: Head-to-head points: Penuel 3; Chornomorets 0) |
| 2 | Chornomorets Odesa | 7 | 4 | 2 | 1 | 20 | 4 | +16 | 14 |
| 3 | Dnipro Cherkasy | 7 | 4 | 1 | 2 | 14 | 9 | +5 | 13 |
| 4 | Atletyk Odesa | 7 | 4 | 0 | 3 | 16 | 10 | +6 | 12 |
| 5 | Khadzhybei Usatove | 7 | 3 | 2 | 2 | 6 | 8 | −2 | 11 |
| 6 | Zirka Kropyvnytskyi | 7 | 3 | 1 | 3 | 13 | 10 | +3 | 10 |
| 7 | DYuSSh Kherson | 7 | 2 | 0 | 5 | 12 | 14 | −2 | 6 |
| 8 | Olimpik Kropyvnytskyi | 7 | 0 | 0 | 7 | 6 | 36 | −30 | 0 |

Source: https://duflu.org.ua/pervaya-lyga/
Rules for classification: 1) points 2) wins 4) head-to-head points 5) head-to-head wins 6) head-to-head goal difference 7) head-to-head goals scored 8) goals difference 9) goals scored 10) lesser number of points for cautions and ejections (1– caution; 3– ejection) 11) draw of lots

=== Top goalscorers ===
As of

| Rank | Scorer | Goals (Pen.) | Team |

=== Group 4 ===
| Pos | Team | Pld | W | D | L | GF | GA | GD | Pts |
|---|---|---|---|---|---|---|---|---|---|
| 1 | FC Kulykiv | 7 | 5 | 2 | 0 | 30 | 7 | +23 | 17 |
| 2 | Podillia Khmelnytskyi | 7 | 4 | 3 | 0 | 15 | 5 | +10 | 15 |
| 3 | Prykarpattia Ivano-Frankivsk | 7 | 4 | 1 | 2 | 18 | 12 | +6 | 13 |
| 4 | K3 Bukovyna Chernivtsi | 7 | 3 | 4 | 0 | 10 | 7 | +3 | 13 |
| 5 | Krystal Chortkiv | 7 | 3 | 1 | 3 | 13 | 13 | 0 | 10 |
| 6 | Halychyna Lviv | 7 | 1 | 1 | 5 | 10 | 18 | −8 | 4 |
| 7 | FC Uhornyky | 7 | 1 | 0 | 6 | 8 | 29 | −21 | 3 (Note: Head-to-head points: Uhornyky 3; Chernivtsi 0) |
| 8 | FSC Chernivtsi | 7 | 1 | 0 | 6 | 5 | 18 | −13 | 3 |

Source: https://duflu.org.ua/pervaya-lyga/
Rules for classification: 1) points 2) wins 4) head-to-head points 5) head-to-head wins 6) head-to-head goal difference 7) head-to-head goals scored 8) goals difference 9) goals scored 10) lesser number of points for cautions and ejections (1– caution; 3– ejection) 11) draw of lots

=== Top goalscorers ===
As of

| Rank | Scorer | Goals (Pen.) | Team |

== See also ==
- 2021–22 Ukrainian First League
- 2021–22 Ukrainian Second League
