= Shchaslyve =

Shchaslyve is a name of several populated places in Ukraine

- Shchaslyve, Boryspil Raion, Kyiv Oblast
- Shchaslyve, Brovary Raion, Kyiv Oblast
- Shchaslyve, Zakarpattia Oblast
- Shchaslyve, Zaporizhia Oblast
- Shchaslyve, Lviv Oblast
- Shchaslyve, Kirovohrad Oblast
- Shchaslyve, Crimea
- Shchaslyve, Kherson Oblast
