= Vyacheslav Tereshchenko =

Ukrainian footballer

Personal information
- Full name: Vyacheslav Volodymyrovych Tereshchenko
- Date of birth: 16 January 1977 (age 49)
- Place of birth: Odesa, Ukrainian SSR, Soviet Union
- Height: 1.86 m (6 ft 1 in)
- Position: Forward

Youth career
- ????–1994: Chornomorets Odesa

Senior career*
Years	Team	Apps	(Gls)
????–1995	Chornomorets Odesa	0	(0)
1994–1995	→ Chornomorets-2 Odesa	26	(4)
1995	Dynamo–Flesh Odesa	8	(0)
1996	Dnister Ovidiopol		
1997	SC Odesa	20	(4)
1997–1998	SKA-Lotto Odesa	53	(35)
1997	→ SKA-Lotto-2 Odesa	2	(1)
1998	Belasitsa Petrich	7	(1)
1998–2001	Chornomorets Odesa	34	(7)
1998–2001	→ Chornomorets–2 Odesa	31	(11)
1999	→ Portovyk Illichivsk	1	(0)
2001–2005	Obolon Kyiv	104	(37)
2005	Chornomorets Odesa	15	(1)
2006	Zakarpattia Uzhhorod	3	(0)
2006–2007	Didzhytal Odesa		
2007	→ Dnister Ovidiopol	8	(2)
2007	→ Ivan Odesa	2	(3)
2009	Biliaivka		

Managerial career
- 2009: Biliaivka
- 2008–: Chornomorets Odesa (academy)
- * Club domestic league appearances and goals

Vyacheslav Volodymyrovych Tereshchenko (Ukrainian: В'ячеслав Володимирович Терещенко; born 16 January 1977) is a Ukrainian former professional football forward.
