= FC Hirnyk Kryvyi Rih =

Hirnyk Kryvyi Rih
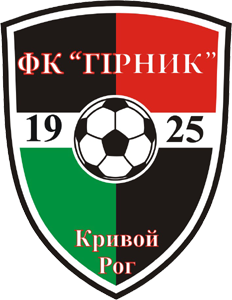
- Full name: FC Hirnyk Kryvyi Rih
- Founded: 1925
- Ground: Metalurh Stadium; October Mine Stadium
- League: Ukrainian Second League
- 2019–20: Group B, 4th
Home colours	Away colours

FC Hirnyk Kryvyi Rih (Ukrainian: Гірник Кривий Ріг) was a Ukrainian football club based in Kryvyi Rih. The club adapted its name in 2003 and originally as "Gornyak" (in Russian). Later the club's name was changed to Hirnyk (in Ukrainian). In 2020 it was completely rebranded as Kryvbas.

In August 2020, the main team was restructured as FC Kryvbas Kryvyi Rih, and its U-19 team became entered junior competitions as Hirnyk. The teams played in the 2020–21 Ukrainian First League U–19 Championship. Also, there was information about Hirnyk entering amateur competitions. Later that team was renamed as Kryvbas-2.

== History ==
It is part of the Sports Club Hirnyk which combines several other sections. The club's owner is the Kryvyi Rih Iron Ore Works (KZRK), the biggest subterranean iron mining company in Ukraine. KZRK traces its origin from the Soviet industrial giant "Kryvbas Ruda" (1973–1998). The club was created in 1998 as FC Rodina Kryvyi Rih, but it traces its history to 1925 as a team of Karl Liebknecht Quarry (Ukrainian: команда рудника імені Лібкнехта).

The modern football club currently competes in the Ukrainian First League and was formed in 2001. After finishing 3rd in the Ukrainian Amateur Championships in 2003 the club's administration decided to enter the professional leagues.

The club plays their games at either "Shakhta Zhovtneva" or "Budivelnyk" stadiums.

The club was promoted to the Ukrainian First League after finishing 4th in 2014.

Unfortunately the club withdrew from the PFL at the end of the 2015–16 season. After a year's absence the club competed in the Ukrainian Amateur competition and in regained professional status for the 2018–19 season.

In August 2020, the main team was transformed into FC Kryvbas Kryvyi Rih which was brought back to professional football. The Hirnyk U-19 team became the main team of Hirnyk. The teams played in the 2020–21 Ukrainian First League U–19 Championship.

Also, Hirnyk entered the 2020–21 Ukrainian Football Amateur League and later changed its name to Kryvbas-2.

== League and cup history ==
Season	Div.	Pos.	Pl.	W	D	L	GS	GA	P	Domestic Cup	Europe	Notes
competitive record of the club during the Soviet period is unknown
Kryvbas-Ruda Kryvyi Rih
1994-95	4th	11	32	14	5	13	40	29	47			
1996-97	4th	x							0			withdrew before the start of season
information about the club is scarce for 1997–2000
renamed as Rodina Kryvyi Rih (Batkivshchyna)
2000	4th	3	6	2	1	3	11	11	7			
2001	4th	3	6	3	0	3	5	7	9			withdrew
2002	4th	3	7	3	0	4	7	12	9			
renamed back to as Hirnyk Kryvyi Rih
2003	4th	1	8	5	2	1	19	8	17			
2003	4th	3	8	3	4	1	14	11	13			
2003	4th	3	5	2	2	1	8	5	8			
2004	4th	1	6	3	1	2	11	11	10			Withdrew (Note: applied to the Second League)
2004–05	3rd "B"	13	26	7	6	13	21	25	27	Did not enter		
2005–06	3rd "B"	11	28	7	11	10	23	34	32	1/32 finals		
2006–07	3rd "B"	6	28	13	5	10	46	41	44	1/32 finals		
2007–08	3rd "B"	14	34	9	10	15	43	51	37	Did not enter		
2008–09	3rd "B"	10	34	12	11	11	37	33	47	1/64 finals		–6 (Note: Deducted three points for non-paying the participation fees and additional three points for non-paying the participation fees for the second half of the season. The decision was officially declared by the Disciplinary Committee of PFL on May 28, 2009.)
2009–10	3rd "B"	9	26	8	4	14	29	43	28	1/64 finals		
2010–11	3rd "B"	5	22	10	5	7	32	26	35	1/64 finals		
2011–12	3rd "B"	4	26	16	3	7	44	22	51	1/32 finals		
2012–13	3rd	7	24	10	7	7	35	26	37	1/32 finals		Group B
2012–13	3rd	1	8	4	1	3	14	11	13	1/32 finals		Group 4 (Note: one of two relegation groups)
2013–14	3rd	4	36	20	10	6	49	36	70	1/16 finals		Promoted
2014–15	2nd	9	30	10	12	8	32	26	42	1/32 finals		
2015–16	2nd	6	30	13	10	7	39	27	49	1/8 finals		Withdrew
2016–17	Club is idle											
2017–18	4th "3"	5	16	6	2	8	44	35	20			Applied (Note: applied to the Second League)
2018–19	3rd	3	27	15	6	6	53	33	51	1/8 finals		
2019–20	3rd "B"	4	20	10	3	7	33	22	33	1/64 finals		
The main team restructured as FC Kryvbas Kryvyi Rih, and the U-19 team became the main team of Hirnyk

== Coaches ==
- 1998–1999 Serhiy Mykula
- 2001–2002 Serhiy Mykula
- 2003–2004 Serhiy Mykula
- 2006 Ihor Siroshtan
- 2004–2005 Serhiy Kozlov
- 2005 Viktor Bohatyr
- 2006 Serhiy Mykula
- 2007 Serhiy Mykula
- 2008–2010 Serhiy Mykula
- 2010–2020 Hennadiy Prykhodko

== Presidents ==
- 2000–2008 Oleksandr Kovalchuk
- 2008–2020 Kostiantyn Karamanits
