= Ukrainian Youth Football League =

Ukrainian Youth Football League (DUFLU)
- Founded: 2 March 2001
- Country: Ukraine
- Confederation: UEFA
- Level on pyramid: 1 (3 tiers)
- Relegation to: Regional championships
- International cup: UEFA Youth League (thru UPL youth U-19 competitions)
- Website: duflu.org.ua
- Current: 2021

The Ukrainian National Youth Competition (Ukrainian: Дитячо-юнацька футбольна ліга України, (ДЮФЛУ), romanized: Dytiacho-yunatska futbolna liha Ukrainy, (DIuFLU)) is a Ukrainian organization of the Ukrainian Association of Football that conducts association football competitions among youth teams in four age categories (under-14, U-15, U-16, and U-17) and originally consisted of two tiers the Supreme and the First Leagues. The Supreme Leagues consists out of four regional groups and the First have eight. In 2020 there was introduced the Elite League (top tier). The competition's oldest age group has the teenagers who are no older than 17 years old and the youngest - the teenagers no older than 14.

Along with the Professional Football League of Ukraine starting in 2016 the Youth League is also co-organizer of separate Under-19 competitions.

== Composition ==
The league is composed of teams with players between ages under 14 through under 17. The league features teams of various association football and sports school and in addition to them each club of the Ukrainian Premier League is obligated to field four of its junior teams in the league.

- Football academies of Premier league clubs
- sports schools (Soviet children-youth sports school network, DUSSh)
- sports schools of Olympic reserve (Soviet children-youth sports schools of Olympic reserve network, SDUShOR)
- youth football clubs (Children-youth football clubs, DUFC)
- colleges of physical culture (UFK)
- colleges of Olympic reserve (UOR)

== Competitions ==
The youth competitions started in 1998, yet the youth league was established not until 2001. In 2000 there was established a separate football competition among students of universities.

In 2002 the Professional Football League of Ukraine (PFL Ukraine) established experimental under-19 competitions among junior teams of the PFL clubs which however was discontinued four seasons later. With the PFL u-19 competitions ongoing in 2004, PFL Ukraine established separate competition among reserves (doubles) for club of the Top League (Vyshcha Liha), the precursor of the Ukrainian Premier League. The Top league teams that competed in the PFL u-19 competitions were moved to the new competitions. Introduction of the new Top League reserve competitions led to withdrawal of some reserve teams or the second teams (so called dvushki) that competed at Ukrainian Second League and in the way clearing the football "pyramid" of farm teams.

=== Earlier youth competition ===
List of best finishers for youth competitions before establishment of the actual Ukrainian Youth Football League.

Season	Age restr	Winner	2nd best	3rd best
1998-99	Senior	Dynamo Kyiv	Kremin Kremenchuk	UOR Donetsk
1998-99	Junior	UOR Donetsk	Shakhtar Donetsk	Dynamo Kyiv
1999-00	Senior	Dynamo Kyiv	Shakhtar Donetsk	Kryvbas Kryvyi Rih
1999-00	Junior	Shakhtar Donetsk	Dnipro-75 Dnipropetrovsk	UFK Dnipropetrovsk
2000-01	Senior	Dynamo Kyiv	Zmina-Obolon Kyiv	UFK Dnipropetrovsk
2000-01	Junior	Femida-Inter Lutsk	Dynamo Kyiv	Chornomorets Odesa

=== Ukrainian Youth Football League (Top League) ===
Season	Age restr	Winner	2nd best	3rd best
2001-02	U-17	RVUFK Kyiv	Dnipromain Dnipropetrovsk	Shakhtar Donetsk
2001-02	U-16	Shakhtar Donetsk	Dnipromain Dnipropetrovsk	Dynamo Kyiv
2001-02	U-15	Zmina-Obolon Kyiv	RVUFK Kyiv	Lokomotyv Kyiv
2001-02	U-14	Shakhtar Donetsk	Dynamo Kyiv	Atlant-Kremez Kremenchuk
2002-03	U-17	Shakhtar Donetsk	Femida-Inter Lutsk	Karpaty Lviv
2002-03	U-16	Lokomotyv Kyiv	Shakhtar Donetsk	Metalurh Zaporizhia
2002-03	U-15	Lokomotyv Kyiv	Femida-Inter Lutsk	Atlant Kremenchuk
2002-03	U-14	Shakhtar Donetsk	Lokomotyv Kyiv	Dynamo Kyiv
2003-04	U-17	Shakhtar Donetsk	Dynamo Kyiv	Metalurh Zaporizhia
2003-04	U-16	Shakhtar Donetsk	Dynamo Kyiv	Vidradnyi Kyiv
2003-04	U-15	Dynamo Kyiv	Vidradnyi Kyiv	Shakhtar Donetsk
2003-04	U-14	Shakhtar Donetsk	Vidradnyi Kyiv	Volyn Lutsk
2004-05	U-14	Dynamo Kyiv	Shakhtar Donetsk	Arsenal Kyiv
2004-05	U-15	Dynamo Kyiv	Karpaty Lviv	RVUFK Kyiv
2004-05	U-16	Dynamo Kyiv	Metalurh Donetsk	Vidradnyi Kyiv
2004-05	U-17	Dynamo Kyiv	Shakhtar Donetsk	Vidradnyi Kyiv
2005-06	U-14	Vidradnyi Kyiv	RVUFK Kyiv	Shakhtar Donetsk
2005-06	U-15	Shakhtar Donetsk	Dynamo Kyiv	Metalurh Zaporizhia
2005-06	U-16	RVUFK Kyiv	Dynamo Kyiv	Shakhtar Donetsk
2005-06	U-17	Dynamo Kyiv	RVUFK Kyiv	Shakhtar Donetsk
2006-07	U-14	Shakhtar Donetsk	Olimpik Donetsk	Vidradnyi Kyiv
2006-07	U-15	Dynamo Kyiv	Shakhtar Donetsk	RVUFK Kyiv
2006-07	U-16	Shakhtar Donetsk	Arsenal Kyiv	Dynamo Kyiv
2006-07	U-17	RVUFK Kyiv	Inter-Liliya Dnipropetrovsk	Molod-DYuSSh Poltava
2007-08	U-14 (1994)	Shakhtar Donetsk	Metalurh Zaporizhia	Dynamo Kyiv
2007-08	U-15 (1993)	Dynamo Kyiv	Shakhtar Donetsk	BRW-VIK Volodymyr-Volynskyi
2007-08	U-16 (1992)	BRW-VIK Volodymyr-Volynskyi	Olimpik Donetsk	Shakhtar Donetsk
2007-08	U-17 (1991)	Shakhtar Donetsk	Dynamo Kyiv	Arsenal Kyiv
2008-09	U-14 (1995)	Dynamo Kyiv	BRW-VIK Volodymyr-Volynskyi	Metalist Kharkiv
2008-09	U-15 (1994)	Dynamo Kyiv	Shakhtar Donetsk	UFK Lviv
2008-09	U-16 (1993)	Shakhtar Donetsk	DYuSSh-11 Chornomorets Odesa	RVUFK Kyiv
2008-09	U-17 (1992)	Dynamo Kyiv	Metalurh Donetsk	Shakhtar Donetsk
2009-10	U-14 (1996)	Shakhtar Donetsk	RVUFK Kyiv	Metalurh Zaporizhia
2009-10	U-15 (1995)	Dynamo Kyiv	Chornomorets Odesa	Shakhtar Donetsk
2009-10	U-16 (1994)	Shakhtar Donetsk	Metalist Kharkiv	BRW-VIK Volodymyr-Volynskyi
2009-10	U-17 (1993)	Dynamo Kyiv	Shakhtar Donetsk	RVUFK Kyiv
2010-11	U-14 (1997)	Karpaty Lviv	Shakhtar Donetsk	Dynamo Kyiv
2010-11	U-15 (1996)	Shakhtar Donetsk	RVUFK Kyiv	Dynamo Kyiv
2010-11	U-16 (1995)	Dynamo Kyiv	UFK Lviv	Karpaty Lviv
2010-11	U-17 (1994)	Shakhtar Donetsk	Illichivets Mariupol	BRW-VIK Volodymyr-Volynskyi
2011-12	U-14 (1998)	Metalist Kharkiv	Dynamo Kyiv	BRW-VIK Volodymyr-Volynskyi
2011-12	U-15 (1997)	Shakhtar Donetsk	Karpaty Lviv	Dynamo Kyiv
2011-12	U-16 (1996)	Shakhtar Donetsk	Dynamo Kyiv	UFK Lviv
2011-12	U-17 (1995)	Shakhtar Donetsk	Dynamo Kyiv	Chornomorets Odesa
2012-13	U-14 (1999)	Shakhtar Donetsk	UFK Lviv	Dynamo Kyiv
2012-13	U-15 (1998)	UFK Dnipropetrovsk	Shakhtar Donetsk	Metalist Kharkiv
2012-13	U-16 (1997)	Dynamo Kyiv	Shakhtar Donetsk	Illichivets Mariupol
2012-13	U-17 (1996)	Shakhtar Donetsk	UFK Lviv	Dynamo Kyiv
2013-14	U-14 (2000)	Shakhtar Donetsk	UFK Lviv	Dynamo Kyiv
2013-14	U-15 (1999)	Shakhtar Donetsk	RVUFK Kyiv	Metalurh Zaporizhia
2013-14	U-16 (1998)	Dynamo Kyiv	Karpaty Lviv	Metalist Kharkiv
2013-14	U-17 (1997)	Dynamo Kyiv	Karpaty Lviv	Shakhtar Donetsk
2014-15	U-14 (2001)	Shakhtar Donetsk	Dynamo Kyiv	Karpaty Lviv
2014-15	U-15 (2000)	Dynamo Kyiv	Chornomorets Odesa	Dnipro Dnipropetrovsk
2014-15	U-16 (1999)	Dynamo Kyiv	UFK-Karpaty Lviv	Dnipro Dnipropetrovsk
2014-15	U-17 (1998)	Metalurh Zaporizhia	Dynamo Kyiv	Dnipro Dnipropetrovsk
2015-16	U-14 (2002)	Shakhtar Donetsk	Dynamo Kyiv	Zmina-Obolon Kyiv
2015-16	U-15 (2001)	Dynamo Kyiv	UFK-Karpaty Lviv	Zmina-Obolon Kyiv
2015-16	U-16 (2000)	Dynamo Kyiv	Shakhtar Donetsk	Metalist Kharkiv
2015-16	U-17 (1999)	Dynamo Kyiv	Karpaty Lviv	Shakhtar Donetsk
2016-17	U-14 (2003)	Dynamo Kyiv	UFK-Karpaty Lviv	Shakhtar Donetsk
2016-17	U-15 (2002)	Dynamo Kyiv	Shakhtar Donetsk	UFK-Karpaty Lviv
2016-17	U-16 (2001)	Dynamo Kyiv	Metalurh Zaporizhia	Dnipro Dnipropetrovsk
2016-17	U-17 (2000)	Dynamo Kyiv	UFK-Karpaty Lviv	Shakhtar Donetsk
2017-18	U-14 (2004)	Shakhtar Donetsk	Dynamo Kyiv	Chornomorets Odesa
2017-18	U-15 (2003)	Shakhtar Donetsk	Dynamo Kyiv	Bukovyna Chernivtsi
2017-18	U-16 (2002)	Dynamo Kyiv	Shakhtar Donetsk	FC Dnipro
2017-18	U-17 (2001)	Shakhtar Donetsk	UFK-Karpaty Lviv	Dynamo Kyiv

== Top League winners ==
=== Teams under-17 ===
Club	Winner	Runners-up	Third place	Seasons won
Dynamo Kyiv	7	4	2	
Shakhtar Donetsk	7	2	6	
RVUFK Kyiv	1	1	1	
Metalurh Zaporizhia	1	0	0	

=== Teams under-16 ===
Club	Winner	Runners-up	Third place	Seasons won
Dynamo Kyiv	8	3	2	
Shakhtar Donetsk	6	4	3	
RVUFK Kyiv	1	0	1	
BRW-VIK Volodymyr-Volynskyi	1	0	1	
Lokomotyv Kyiv	1	0	0	

=== Teams under-15 ===
Club	Winner	Runners-up	Third place	Seasons won
Dynamo Kyiv	9	2	2	
Shakhtar Donetsk	5	5	2	
Lokomotyv Kyiv	1	0	1	
Zmina-Obolon Kyiv	1	0	1	
UFK Dnipropetrovsk	1	0	0	

=== Teams under-14 ===
Club	Winner	Runners-up	Third place	Seasons won
Shakhtar Donetsk	11	2	2	
Dynamo Kyiv	3	5	5	
Vidradnyi Kyiv	1	1	1	
Karpaty Lviv	1	0	1	
Metalist Kharkiv	1	0	1	
