= FC Barsa Sumy =

Barsa Sumy
- Full name: Child-Junior Football Center Barsa Sumy
- Founded: 2012
- Ground: Barsa Football Center
- Capacity: 900
- Chairman: Vadym Hordiyenko
- 2015–16: 12th
- Website: https://fcbarsa.com.ua/

FC Barsa Sumy is a youth football center and a former professional football club from Sumy, Ukraine.

== History ==
It was created in 2012 based on the Specialized Sports School of Olympic Reserve.

After participating in the 2013 Ukrainian Football Amateur League competition the administration decided to enter the professional leagues for the 2015–16 season. Finishing in 12th position in the 2015–16 the club's administration decided to withdraw from the PFL.

== League and cup history ==
Season	Div.	Pos.	Pl.	W	D	L	GS	GA	P	Domestic Cup	Europe	Notes
2013	4th	5	8	2	2	4	6	11	8			
2015–16	3rd	12	26	5	3	18	14	51	18	1/32 finals		Withdrew
2016-17	Res (2nd)	2	18	12	3	3	40	12	39			Group 1
2016-17	Res (2nd)	4	5	1	1	3	5	15	4			Final group
