= 1976 Cup of the Ukrainian SSR =

Tournament details
- Country: Ukrainian SSR
- Teams: 21

Final positions
- Champions: SKA Kiev
- Runners-up: Shakhtar Horlivka

The 1976 Ukrainian Cup was the 24th edition of the Ukrainian SSR football knockout competition, known as the Ukrainian Cup. The competition started on May 28, 1976.

The last year cup holder Zirka Kirovohrad was knocked out of the competition by Metalist Kharkiv in the quarterfinals.

== Teams ==
=== Tournament distribution ===
The competition was conducted among all 20 clubs of the 1976 Soviet Second League, Zone 6 and Bliuminh Kramatorsk.

First round (10 teams)	10 entrants from the Second League (Zone 6)	
Second round (16 teams)	11 entrants from the Second League (Zone 6)	5 winners from the First round

=== Other professional teams ===
Many Ukrainian professional teams (9) in higher tiers of the Soviet football league pyramid did not take part in the competition.

- 1976 Soviet Top League (6): FC Chornomorets Odesa, FC Dnipro Dnipropetrovsk, FC Dynamo Kyiv, FC Karpaty Lviv, FC Shakhtar Donetsk, FC Zorya Voroshylovhrad
- 1976 Soviet First League (3): FC Metalurh Zaporizhia, FC Spartak Ivano-Frankivsk, SC Tavriya Simferopol

== Competition schedule ==
=== First round (1/16) ===
Games were played on 28 May 1976.

Team 1	Score	Team 2
Khvylia Khmelnytskyi	~~0–2~~ w/o	Krystal Kherson
Bukovyna Chernivtsi	4–0	Avanhard Rivne
Kolos Nikopol	1–1 (5–3 p)	Sudnobudivnyk Mykolaiv
Frunzenets Sumy	2–1	Lokomotyv Vinnytsia
Kryvbas Kryvyi Rih	0–2	Hoverla Uzhhorod

Notes

- The following clubs received bye for the next round: FC Metalist Kharkiv, FC Kolos Poltava, FC Zirka Kirovohrad, Blyuminh Kramatorsk, FC Shakhtar Horlivka, FC Avtomobilist Zhytomyr, SKA Odessa, FC Atlantyka Sevastopol, FC Novator Zhdanov, SC Lutsk, SKA Kiev (earlier this year SC Chernigov).
- Originally the game Khvylia – Krystal ended in 0:2 win of Kherson team, but the result was annulled and the win awarded to the Khmelnytskyi team because Krystal fielded ineligible player.

=== Second round ===
Most games were played on 19 July 1976.

Team 1	Score	Team 2
Metalist Kharkiv	4–1 (a.e.t.)	Kolos Poltava
Zirka Kirovohrad	w/o	Blyuminh Kramatorsk
Kolos Nikopol	1–2	Shakhtar Horlivka
Hoverla Uzhhorod	1–0	Frunzenets Sumy
Bukovyna Chernivtsi	2–0	Khvylia Khmelnytskyi
Avtomobilist Zhytomyr	1–0	SKA Odessa
Atlantyka Sevastopol	2–1	Novator Zhdanov
SKA Kiev	3–1	SC Lutsk

=== Quarterfinals ===
Games were played on 29 September 1976.

Team 1	Score	Team 2
Metalist Kharkiv	3–2	Zirka Kirovohrad
Avtomobilist Zhytomyr	2–0	Bukovyna Chernivtsi
SKA Kiev	2–0	Atlantyka Sevastopol
Shakhtar Horlivka	2–0	Hoverla Uzhhorod

=== Semifinals ===
Games were played on 31 October 1976.

Team 1	Score	Team 2
Shakhtar Horlivka	2–2 (5–4 p)	Metalist Kharkiv
SKA Kiev	1–0	Avtomobilist Zhytomyr

=== Final ===
6 November 1976	FC Shakhtar Horlivka	0–2	SKA Kiev	Horlivka
			38' Kudia; 88' Pinchuk	Stadium: Shakhtar Stadium; Attendance: 6,000; Referee: Mykhailo Kusen (Lviv)
