= 1978 Soviet Second League, Zone 2 =

Football Championship of Ukrainian SSR
- Season: 1978
- Champions: Metalist Kharkiv
- Promoted: Metalist Kharkiv
- Relegated: none
- Top goalscorer: 19 - Volodymyr Sakalov (Bukovyna)

The 1978 Football Championship of Ukrainian SSR was the 48th season of association football competition of the Ukrainian SSR, which was part of the Soviet Second League in Zone 2. The season started on 2 April 1978.

The 1978 Football Championship of Ukrainian SSR was won by Metalist Kharkiv.

The "Ruby Cup" of Molod Ukrayiny newspaper (for the most scored goals) was received by SKA Kiev.

== Teams ==
=== Location map ===
Locations of teams in Second League, Zone 2

=== Relegated teams ===
- Kryvbas Kryvyi Rih – (returning after two seasons)

=== Relocated teams ===
- Start Tiraspol replaced Speranța Drochia (Note: Start Tiraspol was established as a phoenix club of previously disbanded in 1971 Dnestr Tiraspol. It was established as a factory team of the Tiraspol's 1 May Factory. Several players of Speranta moved to the new Tiraspol team, while Speranta itself was transferred to the football championship of the Moldavian SSR.) (returning after eight seasons absence, previously as Dnestr Tiraspol in 1969)

=== Renamed teams ===
- FC Khvylya Khmelnytskyi changed its name to FC Podillya Khmelnytskyi.

== Final standings ==
Pos	Team	Pld	W	D	L	GF	GA	GD	Pts	Promotion or relegation
1	Metalist Kharkiv (C, P)	44	29	12	3	66	20	+46	70	Promoted
2	Kolos Nikopol	44	26	10	8	59	32	+27	62	
3	SKA Kiev	44	23	14	7	71	29	+42	60	
4	Kryvbas Kryvyi Rih	44	24	11	9	63	29	+34	59	
5	Bukovyna Chernivtsi	44	23	11	10	55	25	+30	57	
6	Krystal Kherson	44	20	14	10	46	28	+18	54	
7	Zirka Kirovohrad	44	17	15	12	42	33	+9	49	
8	Avanhard Rovno	44	19	9	16	55	39	+16	47	
9	SKA Lviv	44	16	14	14	52	43	+9	46	
10	Spartak Zhytomyr	44	19	7	18	50	40	+10	45	
11	Desna Chernihiv	44	16	13	15	37	33	+4	45	
12	Lokomotyv Vinnytsia	44	14	16	14	30	31	−1	44	
13	Hoverla Uzhhorod	44	15	10	19	44	53	−9	40	
14	Atlantyka Sevastopol	44	13	13	18	49	54	−5	39	
15	Sudnobudivnyk Mykolaiv	44	11	16	17	38	46	−8	38	
16	Kolos Poltava	44	14	9	21	40	53	−13	37	
17	Novator Zhdanov	44	12	12	20	53	70	−17	36	
18	Dnipro Cherkasy	44	11	12	21	29	53	−24	34	
19	Podillya Khmelnytskyi	44	12	9	23	28	56	−28	33	
20	Frunzenets Sumy	44	10	13	21	39	59	−20	33	
21	Torpedo Lutsk	44	13	6	25	32	72	−40	32	
22	Shakhtar Horlivka	44	13	5	26	36	72	−36	31	Avoided relegation
23	Start Tiraspol	44	6	9	29	22	66	−44	21	Moldavian SSR; Avoided relegation

(C) Champions; (P) Promoted

== Top goalscorers ==
The following were the top ten goalscorers.

#	Scorer	Goals (Pen.)	Team
1	Yuriy Bondarenko	20	Krystal Kherson
1	Yevhen Dereviaha	20	Sudnobudivnyk Mykolaiv
3	Valeriy Petrov	19	Atlantyka Sevastopol
3	Yaroslav Yatsyshyn	19	Spartak Zhytomyr
5	Vitaliy Dmytrenko	18	Kryvbas Kryvyi Rih
6	Volodymyr Chyrkov	16	Avanhard Rivno
6	Mykola Pinchuk	16	SKA Kiev
6	Mykola Tabachuk	16	Podillya Khmelnytskyi

== See also ==
- Soviet Second League
