= 1979 Soviet Second League, Zone 2 =

Football Championship of Ukrainian SSR
- Season: 1979
- Champions: Kolos Nikopol
- Promoted: Kolos Nikopol
- Relegated: none
- Top goalscorer: 20 - Yuriy Bondarenko (Krystal) and Yevhen Dereviaha (Sudnobudivnyk)

1979 Football Championship of Ukrainian SSR was the 49th season of association football competition of the Ukrainian SSR, which was part of the Soviet Second League in Zone 2. The season started on 31 March 1981.

The 1979 Football Championship of Ukrainian SSR was won by Kolos Nikopol.

The "Ruby Cup" of Molod Ukrayiny newspaper (for the most scored goals) was received by Avanhard Rivno.

== Teams ==
=== Location map ===
Locations of teams in Second League, Zone 5

=== Promoted teams ===
- Metalurh Dniprodzerzhynsk – Champion of the Fitness clubs competitions (KFK) (debut)
- Okean Kerch – Third place runner-up of the Fitness clubs competitions (KFK) (returning after 10 seasons)

=== Renamed teams ===
- Nyva Vinnytsia was called Lokomotyv Vinnytsia
- Avtomobilist Tiraspol was called Start Tiraspol

== Final standings ==
| Pos | Team | Pld | W | D | L | GF | GA | GD | Pts | Promotion or relegation |
|---|---|---|---|---|---|---|---|---|---|---|
| 1 | Kolos Nikopol (C, P) | 46 | 28 | 12 | 6 | 68 | 32 | +36 | 68 | Promoted |
| 2 | SKA Kiev | 46 | 26 | 12 | 8 | 65 | 32 | +33 | 64 | |
| 3 | SKA Lviv | 46 | 25 | 11 | 10 | 67 | 33 | +34 | 61 | |
| 4 | Avanhard Rivne | 46 | 23 | 14 | 9 | 76 | 41 | +35 | 60 | |
| 5 | Bukovyna Chernivtsi | 46 | 24 | 10 | 12 | 55 | 32 | +23 | 58 | |
| 6 | Spartak Zhytomyr | 46 | 22 | 12 | 12 | 57 | 41 | +16 | 56 | |
| 7 | Krystal Kherson | 46 | 21 | 10 | 15 | 63 | 45 | +18 | 52 | |
| 8 | Kryvbas Kryvyi Rih | 46 | 18 | 16 | 12 | 62 | 47 | +15 | 52 | |
| 9 | Zirka Kirovohrad | 46 | 20 | 10 | 16 | 44 | 40 | +4 | 50 | |
| 10 | Sudnobudivnyk Mykolaiv | 46 | 18 | 13 | 15 | 48 | 47 | +1 | 49 | |
| 11 | Kolos Poltava | 46 | 18 | 9 | 19 | 48 | 52 | −4 | 45 | |
| 12 | Atlantyka Sevastopol | 46 | 17 | 9 | 20 | 54 | 62 | −8 | 43 | |
| 13 | Podillia Khmelnytskyi | 46 | 17 | 8 | 21 | 44 | 57 | −13 | 42 | |
| 14 | Dnipro Cherkasy | 46 | 14 | 13 | 19 | 38 | 49 | −11 | 41 | |
| 15 | Novator Zhdanov | 46 | 17 | 6 | 23 | 47 | 54 | −7 | 40 | |
| 16 | Hoverla Uzhhorod | 46 | 10 | 19 | 17 | 36 | 46 | −10 | 39 | |
| 17 | Desna Chernihiv | 46 | 13 | 12 | 21 | 37 | 57 | −20 | 38 | |
| 18 | Okean Kerch | 46 | 12 | 14 | 20 | 36 | 52 | −16 | 38 | |
| 19 | Frunzenets Sumy | 46 | 13 | 10 | 23 | 47 | 62 | −15 | 36 | |
| 20 | Torpedo Lutsk | 46 | 10 | 16 | 20 | 42 | 69 | −27 | 36 | |
| 21 | Nyva Vinnytsia | 46 | 11 | 13 | 22 | 36 | 44 | −8 | 35 | |
| 22 | Avtomobilist Tiraspol | 46 | 11 | 13 | 22 | 28 | 47 | −19 | 35 | Moldavian SSR |
| 23 | Metalurh Dniprodzerzhynsk | 46 | 13 | 8 | 25 | 37 | 71 | −34 | 34 | |
| 24 | Shakhtar Horlivka | 46 | 11 | 10 | 25 | 53 | 76 | −23 | 32 | Avoided relegation |

(C) Champions; (P) Promoted

== Top goalscorers ==
The following were the top ten goalscorers.

| # | Scorer | Goals (Pen.) | Team |
|---|---|---|---|
| 1 | Yuriy Bondarenko | 20 | Krystal Kherson |
| 1 | Yevhen Dereviaha | 20 | Sudnobudivnyk Mykolaiv |
| 3 | Valeriy Petrov | 19 | Atlantyka Sevastopol |
| 3 | Yaroslav Yatsyshyn | 19 | Spartak Zhytomyr |
| 5 | Vitaliy Dmytrenko | 18 | Kryvbas Kryvyi Rih |
| 6 | Volodymyr Chyrkov | 16 | Avanhard Rivno |
| 6 | Mykola Pinchuk | 16 | SKA Kiev |
| 6 | Mykola Tabachuk | 16 | Podillya Khmelnytskyi |

== See also ==
- Soviet Second League
