= Valery Petrov =

Valery Petrov may refer to

- Valeriy Petrov, Ukrainian footballer and coach from Crimea
- Valeri Petrov, pseudonym of Bulgarian poet and screenplay writer Valeri Nisim Mevorah
