= 1975 Soviet Second League, Zone 6 =

Football Championship of Ukrainian SSR
- Season: 1975
- Champions: FC Kryvbas Kryvyi Rih
- Promoted: none
- Relegated: none
- Top goalscorer: 15 – Serhiy Zvenyhorodskyi (FC Tiraspol)

The 1975 Football Championship of Ukrainian SSR was the 45th season of association football competition of the Ukrainian SSR, which was part of the Soviet Second League in Zone 6. The season started on 13 April 1975.

The 1975 Football Championship of Ukrainian SSR was won by FC Kryvbas Kryvyi Rih.

The "Ruby Cup" of Molod Ukrayiny newspaper (for the most scored goals) was received by SC Lutsk.

== Teams ==
=== Location map ===
Locations of teams in Second League, Zone 6

=== Relegated teams ===
- none

=== Promoted teams ===
- FC Lokomotyv Zhdanov – (returning after two seasons)

=== Relocated and renamed teams ===
- FC Avanhard Sevastopol changed its name to FC Khvylya Sevastopol.

== Final standings ==
Pos	Team	Pld	W	D	L	GF	GA	GD	Pts	Promotion
1	Kryvbas Kryvyi Rih (C)	32	14	13	5	39	20	+19	41	Promoted
2	Avtomobilist Zhytomyr	32	13	14	5	41	21	+20	40	
3	SC Lutsk	32	13	12	7	46	26	+20	38	
4	SC Chernihiv	32	12	13	7	41	33	+8	37	
5	Zirka Kirovohrad	32	13	10	9	37	22	+15	36	
6	Sudnobudivnyk Mykolaiv	32	13	9	10	39	31	+8	35	
7	Dynamo Khmelnytskyi	32	11	12	9	32	25	+7	34	
8	Lokomotyv Vinnytsia	32	11	11	10	41	36	+5	33	
9	Kolos Poltava	32	11	10	11	44	41	+3	32	
10	Bukovyna Chernivtsi	32	10	12	10	34	38	−4	32	
11	Hoverla Uzhhorod	32	11	10	11	23	27	−4	32	
12	Frunzenets Sumy	32	11	9	12	29	29	0	31	
13	FC Tiraspol	32	8	14	10	36	46	−10	30	
14	Atlantyka Sevastopol	32	12	5	15	38	54	−16	29	
15	Avanhard Rovno	32	9	9	14	22	30	−8	27	
16	Lokomotyv Zhdanov	32	5	10	17	26	48	−22	20	
17	Lokomotyv Kherson	32	3	11	18	24	65	−41	17	Avoided relegation

(C) Champions

== Top goalscorers ==
The following were the top goalscorers.

#	Scorer	Goals (Pen.)	Team
1	Serhiy Zvenyhorodskyi	15	FC Tiraspol
2	Volodymyr Dudarenko	14	SC Lutsk
2	Anatoliy Shydlovskyi	14	Lokomotyv Vinnytsia
2	Volodymyr Voitenko	14	Kolos Poltava
2	Yevhen Dereviaha	14	Sudnobudivnyk Mykolaiv
2	Romeo Tsernikidze	14	Khvylya Sevastopol
7	Mykhailo Zavalnyuk	13	Dynamo Khmelnytskyi
8	Viktor Klochko	12	SC Chernihiv
9	Anatoliy Melnykov	11	SC Chernihiv
9	Mykola Vasyutyn	11	Avtomobilist Zhytomyr
9	Ivan Shariy	11	Kolos Poltava

== See also ==
- Soviet Second League
