= 1974 Soviet Second League, Zone 6 =

Football Championship of Ukrainian SSR
- Season: 1974
- Champions: Sudnobudivnyk Mykolaiv
- Promoted: Metalist Kharkiv
- Relegated: Budivelnyk Ternopil, Pischevik Bendery, Hranit Cherkasy (expelled)
- Top goalscorer: 18 – Valentyn Dzioba (SC Chernihiv)

The 1974 Football Championship of Ukrainian SSR was the 44th season of association football competition of the Ukrainian SSR, which was part of the Soviet Second League in Zone 6. The season started on 6 April 1974.

The 1974 Football Championship of Ukrainian SSR was won by FC Sudnobudivnyk Mykolaiv.

== Teams ==
=== Location map ===
Locations of teams in Second League, Zone 6

=== Relegated teams ===
- FC Metalist Kharkiv – (returning for the first time since 1946 (28 seasons))

=== Promoted teams ===
- FC Hranit Cherkasy – (returning after three seasons; the 1973 champion of KFK competitions of the Ukrainian SSR)
- FC Pischevik Bendery – (the 1973 champion of the Moldavian SSR (KFK))

=== Relocated and renamed teams ===
- FC Zvezda Tiraspol was moved to the zone of the Ukrainian championship (previously in Zone 4) and changed its name to FC Tiraspol.

== Final standings ==
Pos	Team	Pld	W	D	L	GF	GA	GD	Pts	Promotion or relegation
1	Sudnobudivnyk Mykolaiv (C)	38	19	17	2	47	18	+29	55	
2	Metalist Kharkiv (P)	38	15	15	8	63	42	+21	45	Promoted
3	Kryvbas Kryvyi Rih	38	15	14	9	47	33	+14	44	
4	Frunzenets Sumy	38	18	8	12	54	41	+13	44	
5	Hoverla Uzhhorod	38	16	12	10	45	38	+7	44	
6	SC Chernihiv	38	17	9	12	63	46	+17	43	
7	Lokomotyv Vinnytsia	38	14	14	10	48	33	+15	42	
8	Avtomobilist Zhytomyr	38	15	11	12	50	39	+11	41	
9	SC Lutsk	38	14	12	12	33	31	+2	40	
10	Lokomotyv Kherson	38	13	13	12	49	48	+1	39	
11	FC Tiraspol	38	9	21	8	40	40	0	39	
12	Bukovyna Chernivtsi	38	14	10	14	51	45	+6	38	
13	Avanhard Sevastopol	38	14	9	15	46	47	−1	37	
14	Dynamo Khmelnytskyi	38	11	14	13	32	38	−6	36	
15	Kolos Poltava	38	9	17	12	25	29	−4	35	
16	Hranit Cherkasy	38	9	16	13	32	49	−17	34	Excluded
17	Zirka Kirovohrad	38	11	9	18	34	46	−12	31	
18	Avanhard Rovno	38	12	6	20	33	52	−19	30	
19	Budivelnyk Ternopil	38	8	10	20	31	49	−18	26	Relegated
20	Pischevik Bendery	38	5	6	27	14	73	−59	16	Relegated

(C) Champions; (P) Promoted

== Top goalscorers ==
The following were the top goalscorers.

#	Scorer	Goals (Pen.)	Team
1	Valentyn Dzioba	18	SC Chernihiv
2	Valeriy Zhylin	16	Frunzenets Sumy
2	Anatoliy Shydlovskyi	16	Lokomotyv Vinnytsia
2	Mykola Rusyn	16	Hoverla Uzhhorod
2	Valeriy Kyldyakov	16	Hranit Cherkasy
6	Oleksandr Mukha	14	Avanhard Sevastopol
6	Yanosh Habovda	14	Bukovyna Chernivtsi
8	Yosyp Bordash	13	Metalist Kharkiv
8	Oleksandr Martynenko	13	SC Lutsk
10	Yuriy Tsymbalyuk	12	Metalist Kharkiv

== See also ==
- Soviet Second League
