= 1988 Soviet Second League, Zone 6 =

Football Championship of Ukrainian SSR
- Season: 1988
- Champions: Bukovyna Chernivtsi
- Promoted: none (lost playoffs)
- Relegated: Shakhtar Horlivka
- Top goalscorer: 36 - Stepan Pavlov (Chaika Sevastopol)

1988 Football Championship of Ukrainian SSR was the 58th season of association football competition of the Ukrainian SSR, which was part of the Soviet Second League.

The 1988 Football Championship of Ukrainian SSR was won for the second time by FC Bukovyna Chernivtsi. Unlike the last season Tavriya, Bukovyna failed to earn promotion to the First League as it lost the inter-zonal playoffs.

== Teams ==
=== Map ===
Locations of teams in Lower Second League, Zone 1

=== Promoted teams ===
- Dnipro Cherkasy – Champion of the Fitness clubs competitions (KFK) (returning to professional level after an absence of 4 seasons)

=== Relegated teams ===
- None

=== Relocated teams ===
- Prior to the start of the season Dynamo Bila Tserkva moved from Irpin to Bila Tserkva.

== League standings ==
Pos	Team	Pld	W	D	L	GF	GA	GD	Pts	Qualification or relegation
1	Bukovyna Chernivtsi (C)	50	27	16	7	85	31	+54	70	Qualified for zone finals
2	Vorskla Poltava	50	30	8	12	70	42	+28	68	
3	SKA Odesa	50	25	14	11	65	46	+19	64	
4	Okean Kerch	50	24	11	15	71	60	+11	59	
5	Podillya Khmelnytskyi	50	23	13	14	71	51	+20	59	
6	Kryvbas Kryvyi Rih	50	21	14	15	52	45	+7	56	
7	Chayka Sevastopol	50	20	16	14	68	56	+12	56	
8	Torpedo Lutsk	50	21	13	16	60	64	−4	55	
9	Naftovyk Okhtyrka	50	20	15	15	63	54	+9	55	
10	Sudnobudivnyk Mykolaiv	50	22	10	18	66	51	+15	54	
11	Shakhtar Pavlohrad	50	21	9	20	71	75	−4	51	
12	Nyva Ternopil	50	19	13	18	66	59	+7	51	
13	Spartak Zhytomyr	50	18	15	17	57	56	+1	51	
14	Avanhard Rivne	50	21	8	21	52	56	−4	50	
15	Zakarpattia Uzhhorod	50	17	15	18	74	59	+15	49	
16	Novator Zhdanov	50	16	17	17	57	55	+2	49	
17	Prykarpattia Ivano-Frankivsk	50	15	19	16	51	47	+4	49	
18	Krystal Kherson	50	16	15	19	48	52	−4	47	
19	Nyva Vinnytsia	50	15	14	21	47	59	−12	44	
20	Dynamo Bila Tserkva	50	14	15	21	52	63	−11	43	
21	Desna Chernihiv	50	14	14	22	42	59	−17	42	Moved out to different group (zone)
22	Dnipro Cherkasy	50	16	9	25	57	77	−20	41	
23	Zirka Kirovohrad	50	13	15	22	39	60	−21	41	
24	Torpedo Zaporizhzhia	50	13	12	25	55	71	−16	38	
25	Mayak Kharkiv	50	7	20	23	35	68	−33	34	
26	Shakhtar Horlivka	50	8	8	34	35	93	−58	24	Relegation to the Fitness clubs competitions (KFK)

(C) Champions

=== Top goalscorers ===
The following were the top ten goalscorers.

#	Scorer	Goals (Pen.)	Team
1	Stepan Pavlov	36	Chaika Sevastopol
2	Viktor Sakhno	28	SKA Odesa
3	Viktor Oliynyk	24	Bukovyna Chernivtsi
4	Mykola Samoilenko	23	Shakhtar Pavlohrad
5	Vitaliy Buhai	22	Podillya Khmelnytskyi
5	Oleksiy Varnavsky	22	Novator Zhdanov
5	Serhiy Shevchenko	22	Dnipro Cherkasy

== See also ==
- Soviet Second League
