= 1976 Soviet Second League, Zone 6 =

Football Championship of Ukrainian SSR
- Season: 1976
- Champions: FC Kryvbas Kryvyi Rih
- Promoted: FC Kryvbas Kryvyi Rih
- Relegated: none
- Top goalscorer: 22 – Yuriy Tsymbalyuk (Metalist)

The 1976 Football Championship of Ukrainian SSR was the 46th season of association football competition of the Ukrainian SSR, which was part of the Soviet Second League in Zone 6. The season started on 3 April 1976.

The 1976 Football Championship of Ukrainian SSR was won by FC Kryvbas Kryvyi Rih.

The "Ruby Cup" of Molod Ukrayiny newspaper (for the most scored goals) was received by FC Kryvbas Kryvyi Rih.

== Teams ==
=== Location map ===
Locations of teams in Second League, Zone 6

=== Relegated teams ===
- FC Metalist Kharkiv – (returning after a season)

=== Promoted teams ===
- FC Kolos Nikopol – (debut)
- FC Shakhtar Horlivka – (returning after three seasons)

=== Relocated and renamed teams ===
- FC Tiraspol was moved back to Odessa and changed its name to SKA Odessa.
- FC Dynamo Khmelnytskyi changed its name to FC Khvylya Khmelnytskyi.
- FC Lokomotyv Kherson changed its name to FC Krystal Kherson.
- FC Khvylya Sevastopol changed its name to FC Atlantyka Sevastopol.
- FC Lokomotyv Zhdanov changed its name to FC Novator Zhdanov.

=== Final standings ===
Pos	Team	Pld	W	D	L	GF	GA	GD	Pts	Promotion
1	Kryvbas Kryvyi Rih (C, P)	38	22	9	7	60	22	+38	53	Promoted
2	Metalist Kharkiv	38	19	8	11	51	29	+22	46	
3	SKA Odessa	38	16	13	9	46	33	+13	45	
4	Sudnobudivnyk Mykolaiv	38	16	12	10	43	32	+11	44	
5	Krystal Kherson	38	14	15	9	36	24	+12	43	
6	Avtomobilist Zhytomyr	38	14	14	10	44	31	+13	42	
7	Zirka Kirovohrad	38	18	6	14	42	34	+8	42	
8	Kolos Nikopol	38	15	9	14	36	42	−6	39	
9	SC Lutsk	38	11	16	11	34	34	0	38	
10	Khvylya Khmelnytskyi	38	14	8	16	34	34	0	36	
11	SC Chernihiv	38	12	11	15	36	44	−8	35	
12	Lokomotyv Vinnytsia	38	12	11	15	38	47	−9	35	
13	Hoverla Uzhhorod	38	14	7	17	26	38	−12	35	
14	Bukovyna Chernivtsi	38	11	12	15	29	34	−5	34	
15	Avanhard Rovno	38	13	8	17	31	41	−10	34	
16	Kolos Poltava	38	12	9	17	38	44	−6	33	
17	Novator Zhdanov	38	10	13	15	36	52	−16	33	
18	Frunzenets Sumy	38	11	11	16	40	57	−17	33	
19	Shakhtar Horlivka	38	11	10	17	36	45	−9	32	
20	Atlantyka Sevastopol	38	11	6	21	42	61	−19	28	Avoided relegation

(C) Champions; (P) Promoted

== Top goalscorers ==
The following were the top goalscorers.

#	Scorer	Goals (Pen.)	Team
1	Yuriy Tsymbalyuk	22	Metalist Kharkiv
2	Andriy Karpyuk	18	Zirka Kirovohrad
3	Yaroslav Kuhaikevych	17	Avtomobilist Zhytomyr
4	Yuriy Mishyn	16	Kryvbas Kryvyi Rih
5	Yevhen Dereviaha	13	Sudnobudivnyk Mykolaiv
6	Mykhailo Zavalnyuk	12	Khvylya Khmelnytskyi
6	Viktor Sapelnykov	12	Atlantyka Sevastopol
6	Oleh Chumak	12	Kryvbas Kryvyi Rih

== See also ==
- Soviet Second League
