= Serhiy Rudyka =

Ukrainian footballer

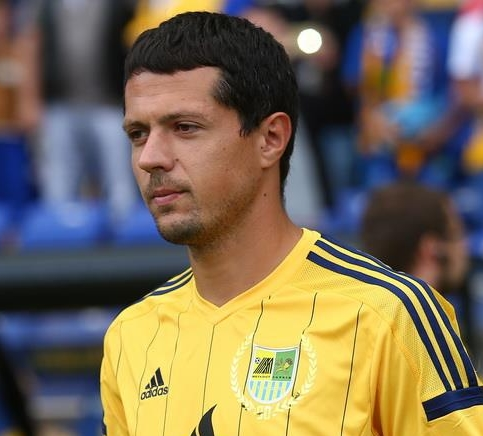

Personal information
- Full name: Serhiy Oleksandrovych Rudyka
- Date of birth: 14 June 1988 (age 38)
- Place of birth: Zaporizhzhia, Ukrainian SSR
- Height: 1.87 m (6 ft 1 1/2 in)
- Position: Midfielder

Youth career
- 2000–2005: Metalurh Zaporizhzhia

Senior career*
Years	Team	Apps	(Gls)
2005–2015	Metalurh Zaporizhzhia	113	(9)
2005–2007	→ Metalurh-2 Zaporizhzhia	15	(3)
2010	→ Zorya Luhansk (loan)	10	(1)
2015	Metalist Kharkiv	12	(1)
2016	Shakhtyor Soligorsk	13	(1)
2016	Karpaty Lviv	5	(0)
2017	Mariupol	16	(0)
2018	Dnepr Mogilev	12	(1)
2019	Vereya	4	(0)
2019	Metalurh Zaporizhzhia	9	(0)
2020	Tavria-Skif Rozdol (amateurs)	2	(0)

International career
2008	Ukraine U21	1	(0)

Managerial career
- 2025: Metalurh Zaporizhzhia (caretaker)
- * Club domestic league appearances and goals as of 23:56, 21 January 2020 (UTC)

Serhiy Rudyka (Ukrainian: Сергій Рудика; born 14 June 1988) is a Ukrainian former footballer who played as a midfielder.

His father Oleksandr Rudyka and uncle Oleksiy Rudyka are also former footballers.

== Career ==
Rudyka is product of youth team system FC Metalurh Zaporizhzhia. His first coach was Y. Bulhakov. Made his debut for FC Metalurh entering as a second time playing against FC Zorya Luhansk on 3 August 2008 in Ukrainian Premier League.
