= Oleksiy Rudyka =

Soviet footballer and coach

Personal information
- Full name: Oleksiy Pavlovych Rudyka
- Date of birth: 7 June 1959 (age 67)
- Place of birth: Zaporizhzhia, Ukrainian SSR, Soviet Union
- Height: 1.75 m (5 ft 9 in)
- Position: Goalkeeper

Youth career
- ????–1976: Sports school Strela Zaporizhzhia

Senior career*
Years	Team	Apps	(Gls)
1977–1978	FC Metalurh Zaporizhzhia	16	(0)
1979–1980	SKA Odesa	10	(0)
1981	FC Khisar Shakhrisabz	17	(0)
1983–1986	FC Torpedo Zaporizhzhia	79	(0)
1987–1989	FC Chayka Sevastopol	100	(0)
2005	FC KAMO Sevastopol		

Managerial career
- 1990–1991: FC Chayka Sevastopol (ass't)
- 1991–1992: FC Chayka Sevastopol
- 1992–1993: FC Chayka Sevastopol (ass't)
- 1995–1996: FC Chayka Sevastopol (goalie coach)
- 2005–2006: FC Sevastopol (goalie coach)
- * Club domestic league appearances and goals

Oleksiy Rudyka (Ukrainian: Олексій Павлович Рудика; 7 June 1959) is a former professional Soviet football goalkeeper and coach.

He has a nephew Serhiy Rudyka who was Ukraine youth international and a twin brother Oleksandr Rudyka.
