= FC Podillya Khmelnytskyi =

- Full name: FC Podillya Khmelnytskyi
- Founded: 1960 (unofficially 1926)
- Ground: SC Podillya, Khmelnytskyi
- Capacity: 6,811
- Chairman: Yevhen Beiderman
- Manager: Oleksandr Volovyk (caretaker)
- League: Ukrainian Second League
- 2025-26: Ukrainian First League, 15th of 16(Relegated)
- Website: www.fcpodillya.com.ua
Home colours	Away colours

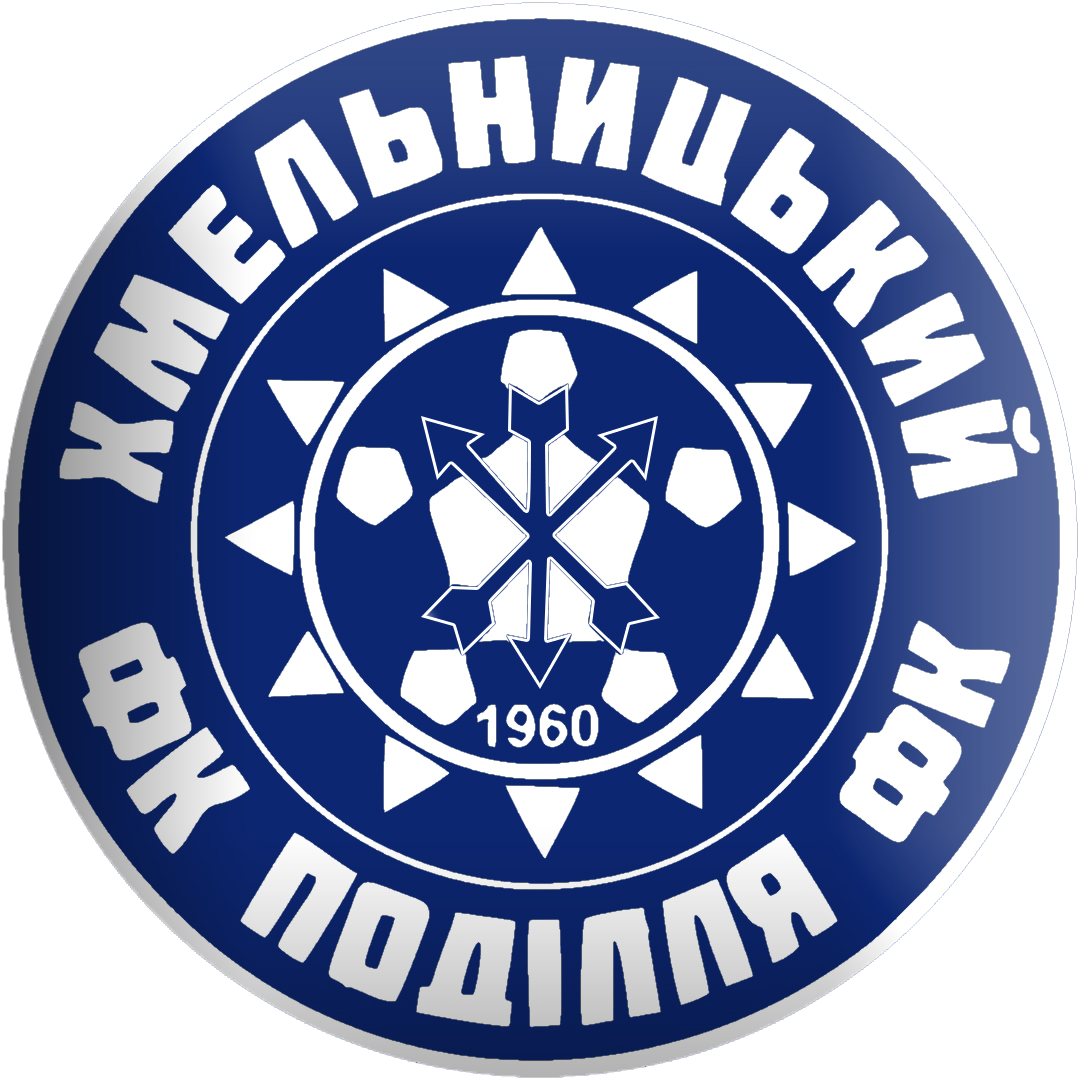
Contrast (blue) variation of the club logo

FC Podillya Khmelnytskyi (Ukrainian: «Поділля» (Хмельницький)) is a Ukrainian professional football team that is based in Khmelnytskyi, Khmelnytskyi Oblast, Ukraine. The club competes in the Ukrainian First League.

== History ==
=== Soviet era ===
Established in the Soviet Union as part of the Dynamo sports society in 1926 as Dynamo Proskurov (Proskuriv), the club participated mostly in championships of the city and its region. In 1940 and 1941, it represented the region in the republican competitions among the sports societies of Ukraine. During World War II, the Soviet sports competitions were suspended and the club was disbanded.

After the World War II, Podillya once again started out as a subsection of the Soviet Dynamo athletic franchise in 1948, under the name of Dynamo, of course. In 1951, it entered all Ukrainian republican football competitions. In 1960, the club obtained the status of "team of master" and entered the Soviet Class B competitions. That year is considered to be the year of establishment. In 1978, the team was renamed after the historical Ukrainian region of Podillya (Podoliya in Russian) where it played its home games.

=== Ukraine ===
After Ukraine gained independence in 1991, Podillya was placed in the Ukrainian First League in the very first season. Podillya finished the year in fourth place out of fourteen teams under the management of Hrynevych.

It was renamed as Nord-Am Ltd.- Podillya in the 1993 season after its sponsor, Nord-Am Ltd (stands for Northern America). During that season, Podillya hired Yuriy Avanesov as its manager. Until club's relegation in 1998 to the Druha Liha, the team was placing inconsistently in the middle of the tournament table. As a result of the relegation, Avanesov was fired and replaced by Kvartsyaniy. He managed the team until September 1997. The team finished the first half of the next season in second place after the return of Avanesov. The year that he returned the team finished first in the Druha Liha and was promoted to the Persha Liha again. They started the 1998–99 season in the Persha Liha however they finished in 16th out of 20 and were relegated again.

They started the 1999–2000 season in Druha Liha A and finished in 2nd place, one stop away from promotion. The 2000–01 season was another year in the Ukrainian Second League where they finished in 6th place in Druha Liha B. The 2001–02 season was another shortcoming season for Podillya when they finished in 3rd with 27 wins, but still one spot away from promotion. Podillya finished the 2002–03 season in 3rd place in Druha Liha A. The 2003–04 season was another 2nd-place finish in Druha Liha A, but still one spot away from promotion.

=== Merger with Krasyliv ===
Podillya started the 2004–05 season in the Ukrainian First League after finishing second the year before. Despite not being in position for promotion, Podillya merged with the FC Obolon Kyiv farm team FC Krasyliv-Obolon under a new name of FC Podillya Khmelnytskyi. The Krasyliv's team existed since 2000 and soon after being promoted in 2002 to the Ukrainian First League merged with FC Obolon Kyiv.

In 2004, after the merger FC Krasyliv with FC Podillya Khmelnytskyi, the club was renamed as AFC Podillya Khmelnytskyi. The newly formed club kept Podillya's name and became independent from Obolon. They play at Podillya Stadium which has 10,000 seats. Players lived in Krasyliv.

=== 2007 crisis, revival of Podillia and transformation of it into Dynamo ===
In 2006–2007, a scandal arose between the club's owner, Petro Arsenyuk, and the mayor of Khmelnytskyi, Serhiy Melnyk, following mayoral elections. In 2007, the professional club playing in the Ukrainian First League moved their home games to Krasyliv.

At the same time, due to the efforts of Stanislav Ostrovskyi and the Khmelnytskyi city authorities in face of Serhiy Melnyk (mayor of Khmelnytskyi), another club, FC Podillya Khmelnytskyi, entered national amateur competition, the 2007 Ukrainian Football Amateur League, as well as Khmelnytskyi Oblast football competitions. Following the first stage of national amateur competitions, the newly formed communal club applied for a place in the Second League. Meanwhile, the Podillya club playing in Krasyliv was relegated and was therefore expected to play in the 2007–08 Ukrainian Second League.

In the end, the Khmelnytskyi Podillya prevailed, while the Krasyliv Podillya withdrew. The new club, under manager Bohdan Blavatskyi, finished third in the 2007–08 Ukrainian Second League season. The following season the club with new manager did not perform well.

During the winter break of the 2008–09 Ukrainian Second League season, the Khmelnytskyi Oblast government withdrew from sponsoring of the team by dissolving the club and the club's senior team was further sponsored by the Khmelnytskyi regional Dynamo sports society which organized FC Dynamo Khmelnytskyi that took over the football team. The club's succession was approved early in March 2009 by the Professional Football League of Ukraine. Parallelly to Dynamo at regional competitions continued to participate Podillia. In 2007, 2008, 2010 and 2011, "Podillya" took part in the Khmelnytskyi Oblast football championships. In 2013 in the Khmelnytskyi Oblast championship it played under name "Podillya-Olimp". At the end of 2013 during the ongoing 2013–14 Ukrainian Second League season, the Dynamo administration announced in official letter to the Professional Football League of Ukraine that FC Dynamo Khmelnytskyi which was established in 2007 has ceased to exist.

=== Latest reorganization and restart ===
In 2014, Podillya entered national competitions among amateurs.

=== Hetman Khmelnytskyi ===
In 2015, a phantom club FC Hetman Khemlnytskyi took part in 2015 Ukrainian Amateur Cup.

=== Since 2016 ===
The club will be competing in the 2016–17 Ukrainian Second League.

In 2020, the president of Podillya, Yevhen Beiderman, ran for the post of the PFL president.

In July 2022, Club announced that it will not be able to participate in the new season of the Ukrainian First League.

== Team names ==
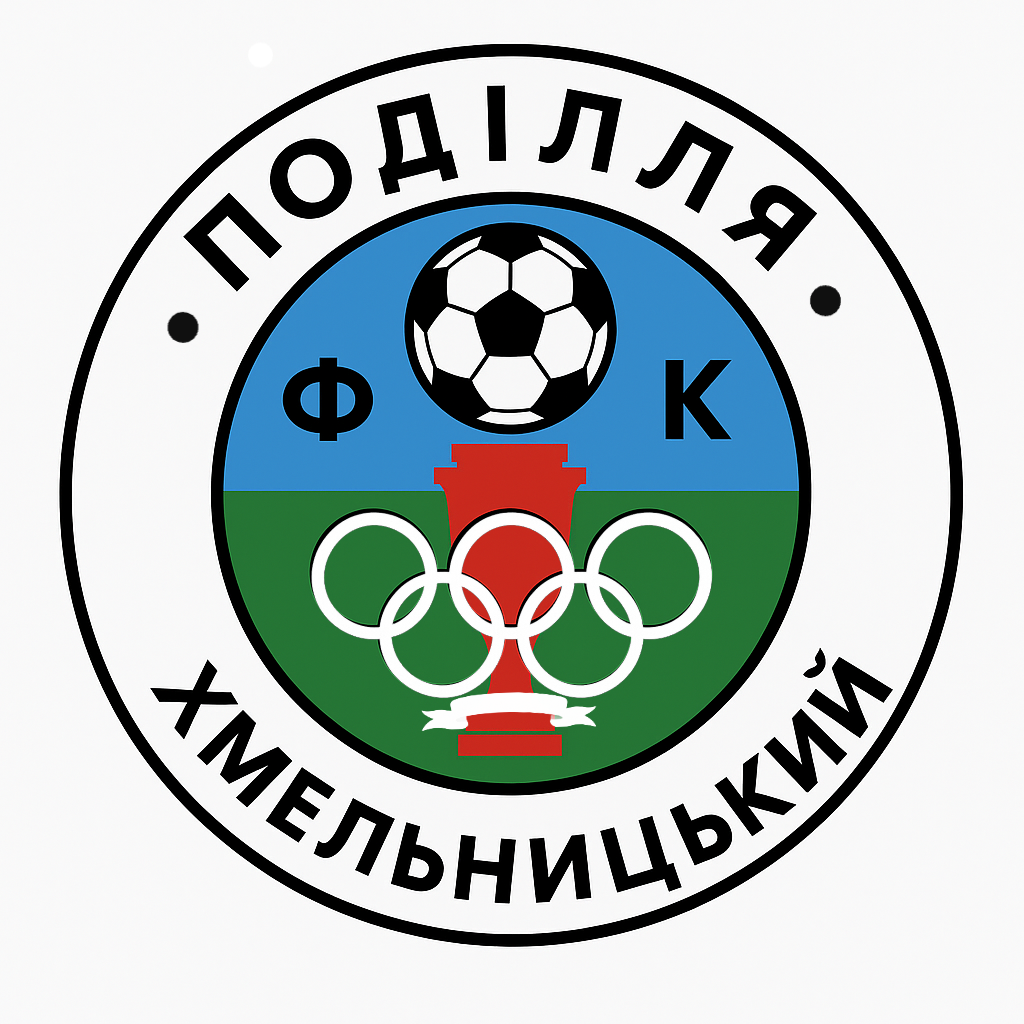
Club Emblem 1992-1999

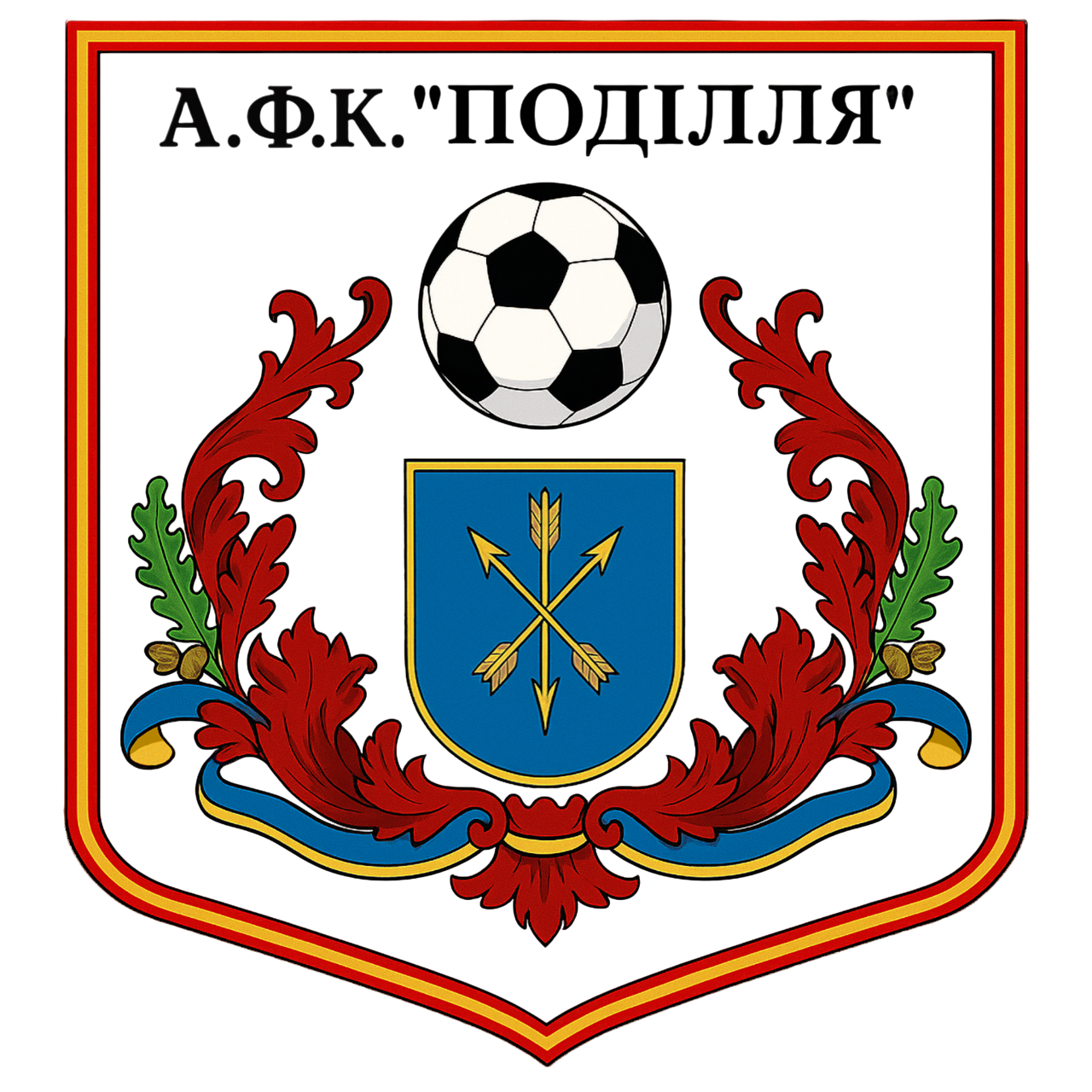
Club Emblem 2000-2007

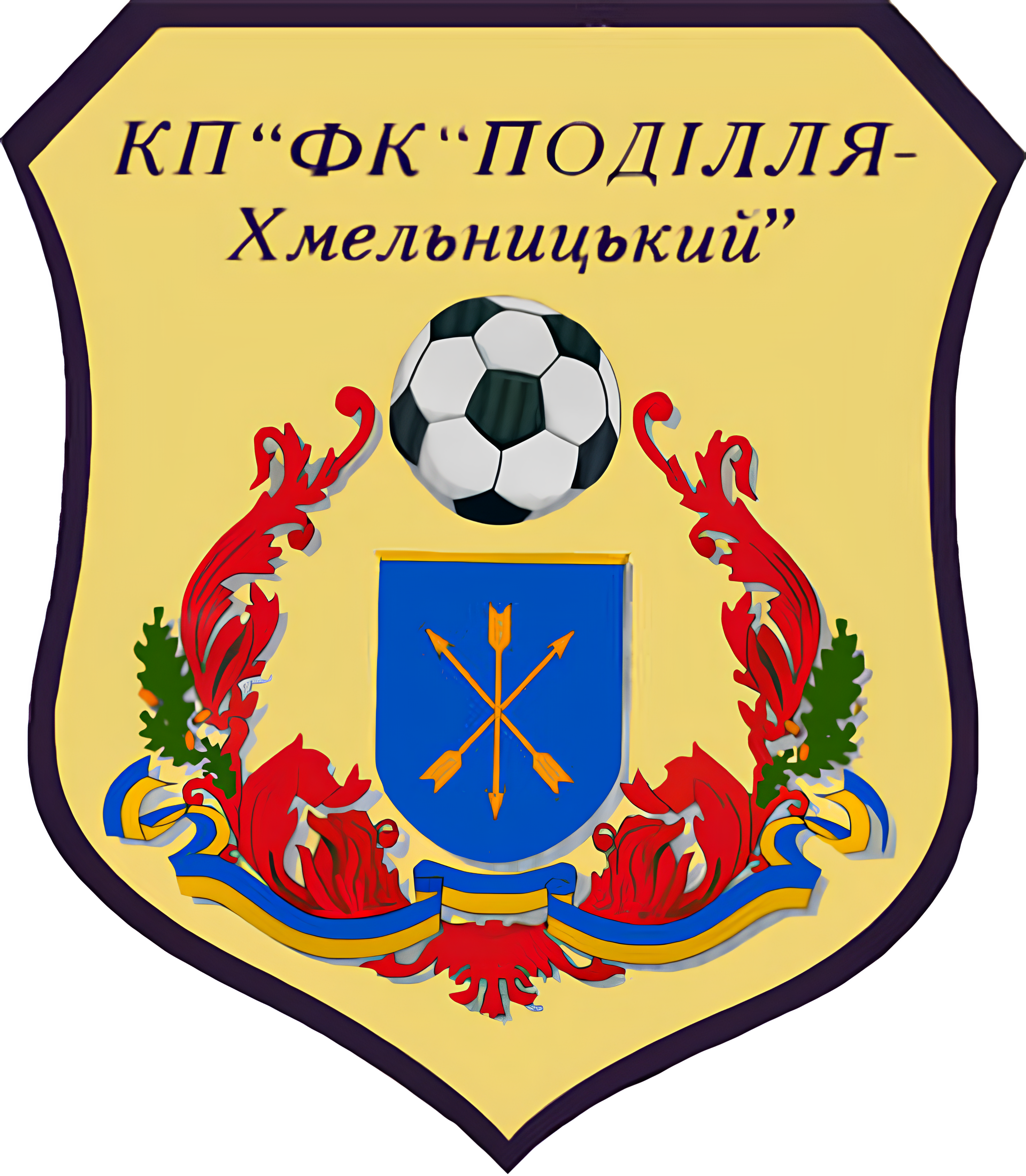
Club Emblem 2007-2008

- 1926–1975: Dynamo (under auspices of the Dynamo regional society, see Dynamo (Ukraine))
- 1975–1978: Khvylya (under auspices of the Trade Union regional society)
- 1978–1993: Podoliya (under auspices of the Avanhard regional society, see Avanhard (sports society))
- 1993–1994: Nord-Am – Podillya
- 1994–2004: Podillya (city team)
- 2004–2007: AFC Podillya (merger with FC Krasyliv, owned by Arsenyuk-Shtefanik)
- 2007–2009: Podillya-Khmelnytskyi (communal enterprise)
- 2009–2013: Dynamo Khmelnytskyi (under auspices of the Dynamo regional society, see Dynamo (Ukraine))
- 2013: Podillya-Olimp
- 2014 onwards: Podillya (city team)

== Stadium ==
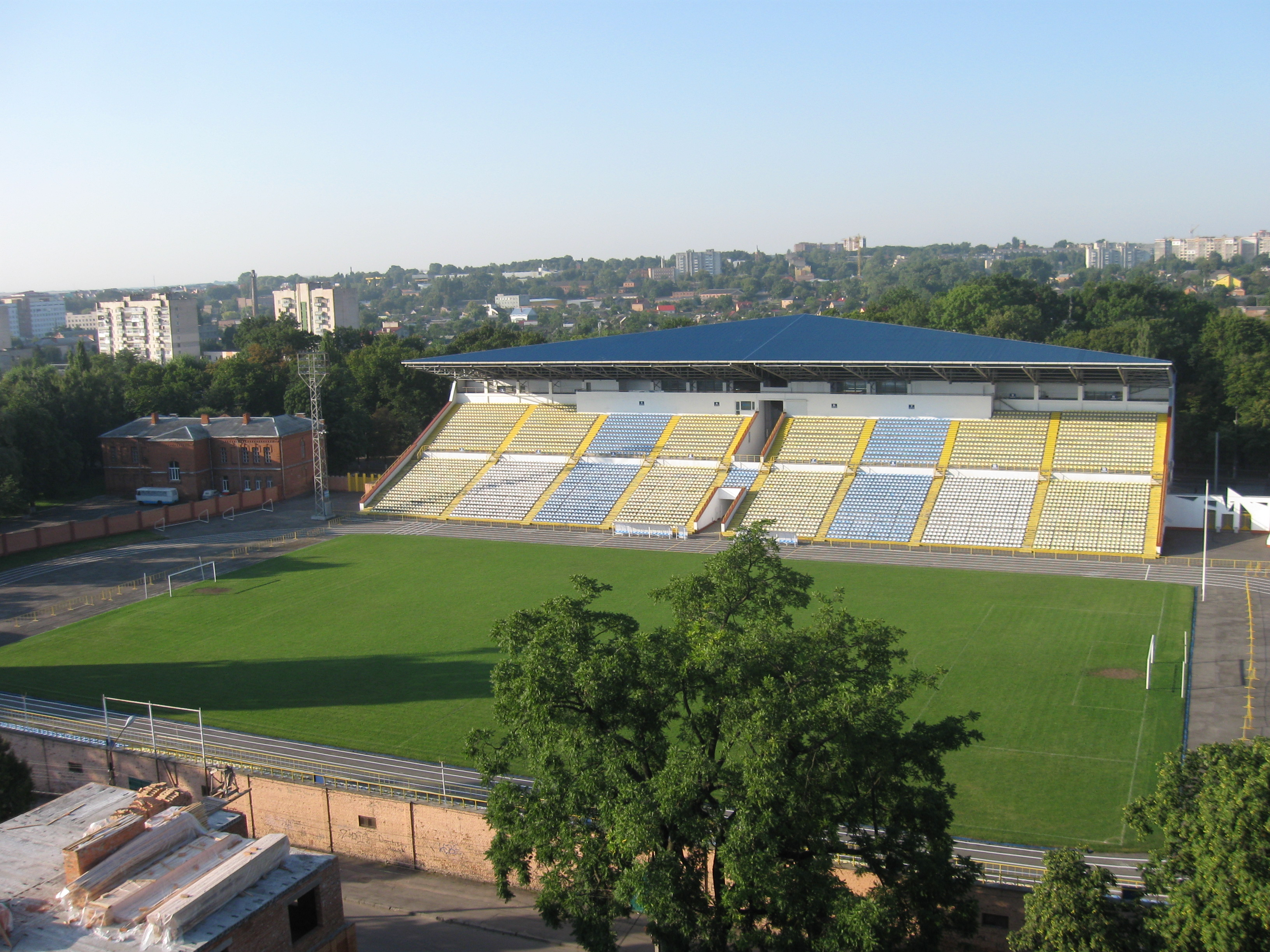
View of the stadium

Podillya Khmelnytskyi play at the Sport Complex Podillya (the venue at the complex is named Podillya Stadium; Ukrainian: Спортивний комплекс «Поділля»; Sportyvnyĭ kompleks "Podillya"), a sports facility in Khmelnytskyi. The stadium has a capacity of 10,500 people, however the club's website lists the capacity at only 6,800.

Podillya Stadium opened in 1960. FC Temp Shepetivka won the 1991 Football Cup of the Ukrainian SSR at the stadium.

The stadium also hosts rugby matches, including a 2015 European Nations Cup international match.

=== Renovation ===
Reconstruction of the stadium started in 2012 and stopped and started until a grant worth ₴4 million was given in 2015 to complete the works.

The football team had to move out of the stadium during reconstruction works but eventually returned before the stadium had been finished. The renovations to the stadium added a six-lane running track so the stadium can host athletic events.

The sports complex also contains an electrical substation.

== Honors ==
- Soviet Second League
  - Runners-up (1): 1966
- Ukrainian Second League
  - Winners (2): 1997–98 (Group A), 2020–21 (Group A)
  - Runners-up (3): 1999–00 (Group A), 2003–04 (Group A)
- Khmelnytskyi Oblast Football Championship
  - Winners (2): 1953, 2010

== Players ==
As of 16 August 2026 Note: Flags indicate national team as defined under FIFA eligibility rules; some limited exceptions apply. Players may hold more than one non-FIFA nationality.

No.	Pos.	Nation	Player
2	DF	UKR	Pavlo Savchuk
4	DF	UKR	Dmytro Herasymchuk
5	MF	UKR	Nazar Lys
7	FW	UKR	Yaroslav Kvasov
8	MF	UKR	Roman Bodnya
9	MF	UKR	Maksym Perekhodko
10	FW	UKR	Maksym Kulish
11	MF	UKR	Vladyslav Chaban
18	MF	UKR	Ruslan Chernenko
19	DF	UKR	Vladyslav Shkinder
20	DF	UKR	Oleksandr Nikolyshyn

No.	Pos.	Nation	Player
21	MF	UKR	Volodymyr Rudyuk
22	DF	UKR	Serhiy Zayets
23	FW	UKR	Vadym Shavrin
27	DF	UKR	Danylo Serbinov
33	GK	UKR	Valeriy Yurchuk
35	FW	UKR	Anton Savin
44	DF	UKR	Bohdan Kovalchuk
77	MF	UKR	Oleksandr Snizhko
98	GK	UKR	Ivan Ponomarenko
99	GK	UKR	Yevhen Kondratyuk
—	DF	UKR	Yevhen Korokhov

=== Out on loan ===
Note: Flags indicate national team as defined under FIFA eligibility rules; some limited exceptions apply. Players may hold more than one non-FIFA nationality.

No. / Pos. / Nation / Player	No. / Pos. / Nation / Player

== League and cup history ==
=== Soviet Union (Ukrainian SSR) ===
Season	Div.	Pos.	Pl.	W	D	L	GS	GA	P	Rep. Cup	Soviet Cup	Notes
Dinamo / Dynamo
1960	2nd (zone 1)	17	32	3	8	21	18	64	14			Relegation play-off
1960	2nd (p/off)		2	1	0	1	5	4	2			Won over FC Avanhard Kamianets-Podilskyi
1961	2nd (zone 1)	8	34	13	7	14	47	45	33			15th place play-off
1961	2nd (p/off)	16	2	0	1	1	3	5	1			Lost to SKF Sevastopol
1961	2nd (p/off)		2	1	0	1	3	1	2			Won over FC Avanhard Kamianets-Podilskyi
1962	2nd (zone 3)	9	24	6	10	8	31	36	22			18-28th places play-off
1962	2nd (p/off)	19	10	6	2	2	16	11	14			Relegated
1962	2nd (p/off)		2	2	0	0	7	1	4			Won over FC Avanhard Kamianets-Podilskyi
1963	3rd (zone 1)	9	38	14	9	15	41	47	37			17th place play-off
1963	3rd (p/off)	17	2	1	0	1	5	2	2			Won over FC Kolhospnyk Poltava
1964	3rd (zone 1)	7	30	12	8	10	35	22	32			13–18th places play-off
1964	3rd (p/off)	13	10	5	2	3	14	10	12			
1965	3rd (zone 2)	4	30	14	9	7	40	26	37			7–12th places play-off
1965	3rd (p/off)	10	10	3	2	5	13	15	8			
1966	3rd (zone 1)	1	38	24	6	8	62	26	54			1st place play-off
1966	3rd (final)	2	2	0	2	0	1	1	2			Lost to FC Avanhard Zhovti Vody
1967	3rd (zone 1)	9	40	13	17	10	40	31	43			
1968	3rd (zone 1)	3	42	21	12	9	59	19	54			Qualified for finals
1968	3rd (finals)	5	7	3	1	3	8	7	7			Promoted
1969	2nd (s/gr 3)	21	42	9	16	17	32	47	34			Relegated
1970	3rd (lower)	4	40	19	13	8	49	24	51			Promoted
1971	3rd	18	50	15	16	19	35	45	46			
1972	3rd	6	46	18	18	10	56	39	54			
1973	3rd	9	44	18	5-10	11	57	45	41			Draws were earned by penalty shootout
1974	3rd	14	38	11	14	13	32	38	36			
Khvylya
1975	3rd	7	32	11	12	9	32	25	34			
1976	3rd	10	38	14	8	16	34	34	36			
1977	3rd	16	44	10	15	19	33	50	35			
Podolia (Note: in Russian language press media sometimes as Podolie) / Podillia
1978	3rd	19	44	12	9	23	28	56	33			
1979	3rd	13	46	17	8	21	44	57	42			
1980	3rd	16	44	13	9	22	32	64	35			
1981	3rd	14	44	15	9	20	45	64	39			
1982	3rd	20	46	12	12	22	37	62	36			
1983	3rd	15	50	18	10	22	56	67	46			
1984	3rd	19	38	13	6	19	52	57	32			two stages
1985	3rd	22	40	14	9	17	35	42	37			two stages
1986	3rd	8	40	16	11	13	64	50	43			two stages
1987	3rd	7	52	23	17	12	67	49	63			
1988	3rd	5	50	23	13	14	71	51	59			
1989	3rd	11	52	24	7	21	64	57	55			Relegated to the lower 2nd League
1990	3rd (lower)	14	36	10	10	16	37	46	30			
1991	3rd (lower)	14	50	18	13	19	54	55	49			transitioned to the Ukrainian First League

=== Ukraine ===
Season	Div.	Pos.	Pl.	W	D	L	GS	GA	P	Domestic Cup	Europe		Notes
Podillia
1992	2nd "A"	4	26	10	10	6	29	21	30	1/32 finals			
1992–93	2nd	8	42	15	16	11	45	39	46	1/64 finals			as Nord-AM-Podillya
1993–94	2nd	11	38	13	9	16	45	47	35	1/32 finals			as Nord-AM-Podillya
1994–95	2nd	6	42	20	11	11	48	30	71	1/32 finals			
1995–96	2nd	12	42	18	8	16	55	42	62	1/16 finals			
1996–97	2nd	22	46	11	13	22	40	66	46	1/32 finals Second stage			Relegated
1997–98	3rd "A"	1	34	25	3	6	69	20	78	1/64 finals			Promoted
1998–99	2nd	16	38	13	12	13	39	42	51	1/64 finals			Relegated
1999-00	3rd "A"	2	30	21	5	4	67	27	68	1/2 final Second League Cup			
2000–01	3rd "B"	6	28	15	2	11	37	28	47	Did not enter			
2001–02	3rd "A"	9	36	14	11	11	38	31	53	1/32 finals			
2002–03	3rd "A"	3	36	27	2	7	79	31	83	1st Round			
2003–04	3rd "A"	2	30	17	8	5	47	20	59	1/32 finals			merged with FC Krasyliv (Note: Podillya merges with FC Krasyliv-Obolon (13th Ukrainian First League 2003-04) and moves the team operations to Krasyliv from Khmelnytskyi prior to the start of season)
2004–06	Club competes in the Oblast League. (Note: Podillya competes in the Oblast League 2005)												
2007	4th	2	8	5	1	2	21	6	16				obtained professional status
2007–08	3rd	3	30	17	7	6	47	28	58	1/64 finals			
2008–09	3rd	8	32	14	5	13	32	38	47	1/32 finals			in winter break replaced with FC Dynamo Khmelnytskyi (Note: During a winter recess Podillya was replaced with FC Dynamo Khmelnytskyi (administered by a regional Dynamo sports society) and lost some players and staff to the new club.)
2010–16	Club competes in the Oblast League.												
2014	4th	5	8	0	2	6	4	18	2				
2016	4th	4	6	1	1	4	4	15	4				obtained professional status
2016–17	3rd(Druga Liha)	14_{/17}	32	7	4	21	29	68	25	1/64 finals			
2017–18	3rd "A"(Druga Liha)	9_{/10}	27	6	4	17	20	44	22	1/64 finals			
2018–19	3rd "A"(Druga Liha)	9_{/10}	27	6	7	14	20	34	25	1/64 finals			
2019–20	3rd "A"(Druga Liha)	6_{/11}	20	8	5	7	23	25	29	1/32 finals			
2020–21	3rd "A"(Druga Liha)	1_{/13}	24	17	6	1	46	13	57	1/64 finals			Promoted
2021–22	2nd(Persha Liha)	8_{/16}	20	7	5	8	19	18	26	1/64 finals	-	-	Competition did not finish
2022–23	Club was allowed to be excused from competitions.												
2023–24	2nd(Persha Liha "A")	7_{/10}	18	4	8	6	18	17	20	Fourth round	-	-	Admitted to Relegation Group
2023–24	2nd(Persha Liha "REL")	12_{/10}	28	9	12	7	36	26	39	Fourth round	-	-	-
2024–25	2nd(Persha Liha "A")	8/8	14	1	5	8	9	19	8	1/32 finals	-	-	Admitted to Relegation Group
2024–25	2nd(Persha Liha "PEL")	15/17	24	5	9	10	22	28	24	1/32 finals	-	-	Relegation play-off: Kolos-2 Kovalivka 2:0 1:0 (3-0)
2025–26	2nd(Persha Liha)	15/16	30	4	9	17	20	45	21	1/16 finals	-	-	Relegation to Ukrainian Second League
2026–27	3rd "A"(Druga Liha)	4/9	11	5	1	5	20	21	16	1/32 finals	-	-	TBD

=== Dynamo 2009 ===
Season	Div.	Pos.	Pl.	W	D	L	GS	GA	P	Domestic Cup	Europe	Notes
Before 2008	refer to Podillya Khmelnytskyi											
2008–09	3rd "A"	8	32	14	5	13	32	38	47	1/32 finals		
2009–10	3rd "A"	5	20	10	3	7	28	16	33	1/64 finals		
2010–11	3rd "A"	9	22	7	4	11	19	29	22	1/32 finals		−3
2011–12	3rd "A"	10	26	6	4	16	23	50	22	1/64 finals		
2012–13	3rd "A"	10	20	4	5	11	12	22	17	1/32 finals		
2012–13	3rd "3"	4	6	0	1	5	1	13	1	1/32 finals		Relegation groups
2013–14	3rd	19	36	3	2	31	18	52	11	1/32 finals		Withdrew

== Managers ==
- (Soviet Union) Andriy Biba (1983)
- (Soviet Union) Leonid Ishchuk (1990)
- (Ukraine) Viktor Matviyenko (1993)
- (Ukraine) Myron Markevych (1995)
- (Ukraine) Vitaliy Kvartsyanyi (1997–99)
- (Ukraine) Bohdan Blavatskiy (2007–08)
- (Ukraine) Yaroslav Bobylyak (2008)

== See also ==
- FC Dynamo Khmelnytskyi (2009)
