= 1973 Soviet Second League, Zone 1 =

Football Championship of Ukrainian SSR
- Season: 1973
- Champions: Tavriya Simferopol
- Promoted: Tavriya Simferopol
- Relegated: Shakhtar Horlivka, Shakhtar Makiivka, Shakhtar Kadiivka, Khimik Severodonetsk, Metalurh Zhdanov, Lokomotyv Donetsk
- Top goalscorer: 28 – Mykola Rusyn (Hoverla Uzhhorod)

The 1973 Football Championship of Ukrainian SSR was the 43rd season of association football competition of the Ukrainian SSR, which was part of the Soviet Second League in Zone 1. The season started on 31 March 1973.

The 1974 Football Championship of Ukrainian SSR was won by SC Tavriya Simferopol.

At the end of the season all six teams from Eastern Ukraine withdrew from competitions.

== Teams ==
=== Location map ===
Locations of teams in Second League, Zone 6

=== Relegated teams ===
- FC Kryvbas Kryvyi Rih – (returning after two seasons)

=== Promoted teams ===
- none

=== Final standings ===
Pos	Team	Pld	W	PKW	PKL	L	GF	GA	GD	Pts	Qualification or relegation
1	Tavriya Simferopol (C, P)	44	26	6	4	8	75	36	+39	58	Promoted
2	Avtomobilist Zhytomyr	44	25	3	2	14	62	36	+26	53	
3	Sudnobudivnyk Mykolaiv	44	23	6	7	8	69	35	+34	52	
4	Hoverla Uzhhorod	44	24	3	5	12	65	52	+13	51	
5	Lokomotyv Vinnytsia	44	18	11	5	10	64	33	+31	47	
6	Shakhtar Horlivka	44	18	9	3	14	58	47	+11	45	Withdrew
7	Avanhard Sevastopol	44	16	13	3	12	44	40	+4	45	
8	Kryvbas Kryvyi Rih	44	18	6	10	10	53	45	+8	42	
9	Dynamo Khmelnytskyi	44	18	5	10	11	57	45	+12	41	
10	Lokomotyv Kherson	44	17	5	10	12	49	33	+16	39	
11	SC Chernihiv	44	18	2	6	18	63	56	+7	38	
12	Zirka Kirovohrad	44	16	4	6	18	63	57	+6	36	
13	Shakhtar Makiivka	44	15	5	9	15	50	48	+2	35	Withdrew
14	Bukovyna Chernivtsi	44	14	7	5	18	44	52	−8	35	
15	Khimik Severodonetsk	44	12	9	5	18	51	64	−13	33	Withdrew
16	Frunzenets Sumy	44	14	4	7	19	49	47	+2	32	
17	Shakhtar Kadiivka	44	15	2	3	24	42	70	−28	32	Withdrew
18	Kolos Poltava	44	12	7	1	24	44	68	−24	31	
19	SC Lutsk	44	11	8	3	22	25	50	−25	30	
20	Budivelnyk Ternopil	44	13	3	13	15	45	55	−10	29	
21	Avanhard Rovno	44	11	5	7	21	34	57	−23	27	
22	Lokomotyv Donetsk	44	9	6	5	24	35	72	−37	24	Withdrew
23	Metalurh Zhdanov	44	10	4	4	26	41	84	−43	24	Withdrew

Rules for classification: Penalty shoot-out was introduced this season. The shoot-out would take place in case when the regular game time ended in draw. Depending on outcome, its winner was awarded a point (same as for a draw) and the loser received no points.
(C) Champion; (P) Promoted

== Top goalscorers ==
The following were the top goalscorers.

#	Scorer	Goals (Pen.)	Team
1	Mykola Rusyn	28	Hoverla Uzhhorod
2	Yuri Adzhem	17	Tavriya Simferopol
3	Viktor Kashchei	16	Zirka Kirovohrad
3	Valentyn Dzioba	16	SC Chernihiv
5	Volodymyr Chyrva	15	Avtomobilist Zhytomyr
5	Volodymyr Dzyuba	15	Lokomotyv Vinnytsia
7	Aleksandr Kotov	14	Zirka Kirovohrad
7	Volodymyr Voronyuk	14	Bukovyna Chernivtsi
9	Ruslan Suanov	13	Dynamo Khmelnytskyi
9	Viktor Klochko	13	Dynamo Khmelnytskyi

== See also ==
- Soviet Second League
