= FSC Bukovyna Chernivtsi =

Professional association football club based in Chernivtsi, Ukraine

Bukovyna Chernivtsi
- Full name: Football Sports Club Bukovyna Chernivtsi
- Nickname: "Zhovto-Chorni" (Yellow-Blacks)
- Founded: 1958; 68 years ago
- Ground: Bukovyna
- Capacity: 12,076
- Owner(s): FSC Bukovyna public organization Andriy Safronyak (president)
- Director: Ihor Nabolotnyi
- Head coach: Serhiy Shyshchenko
- League: Ukrainian Premier League
- 2025–26: Ukrainian First League, 1st of 16 (promoted)
- Website: bukfc.com
| Home colours | Away colours | Third colours |

Football Sports Club Bukovyna Chernivtsi is a Ukrainian professional football club based in Chernivtsi. They currently play in the Ukrainian Premier League, the top tier of Ukrainian football following promotion from Ukrainian First League in the 2025–26 season.

== History ==
The club was established in 1958 as Avanhard Chernivtsi (Avangard Chernovtsy) for republican competitions and became the first club from Chernivtsi Oblast to be added to the Soviet Class B competition in 1960. Before 1958, Chernivtsi were represented by various teams in republican competitions like Burevisnyk (1956), Dynamo (1948, 1950–1955), Spartak (1946, 1947, 1949) and Lokomotyv (1949).

From 1992 to 1994, Bukovyna played in the Ukrainian Premier League, after being initially chosen to participate for being one of the Ukrainian teams taking part in the Soviet First League in 1991.

Bukovyna Chernivtsi's best achievement in the Ukrainian Premier League was 10th place in its first season.

In 2025–26, Bukovyna Chernivtsi became the champions of the Ukrainian First League and secured promotion to the Premier League for the first time since 1994, after 32 years of absence.

== Team names ==
Pre 2009 emblem (Coat of arms of Chernivtsi)

2009 emblem (Coat of arms of Chernivtsi Oblast)

| Year | Name |
| 1952–1958 | Burevisnyk |
| 1958–1964 | Avanhard |
| 1965–current | Bukovyna |

== Current squad ==
As of 10 September 2026

Note: Flags indicate national team as defined under FIFA eligibility rules; some limited exceptions apply. Players may hold more than one non-FIFA nationality.

| No. | Pos. | Nation | Player |
|---|---|---|---|
| 2 | DF | UKR | Danylo Karas |
| 3 | DF | UKR | Mykyta Bezuhlyi |
| 4 | DF | UKR | Taras Sakiv |
| 5 | DF | UKR | Vladyslav Pryimak |
| 6 | MF | UKR | Vyacheslav Tankovskyi (on loan from LNZ Cherkasy) |
| 7 | MF | UKR | Oleh Kozhushko |
| 9 | FW | AZE | Renat Dadaşov |
| 10 | FW | UKR | Bohdan Boychuk (captain) |
| 11 | MF | UKR | Vitaliy Dakhnovskyi |
| 12 | FW | UKR | Yevhen Pidlepenets |
| 14 | DF | UKR | Dmytro Shynkarenko |
| 17 | MF | UKR | Fedir Babak |
| 18 | DF | NGR | Edwin Odinaka |

| No. | Pos. | Nation | Player |
|---|---|---|---|
| 19 | MF | UKR | Arseniy Kilyevyi |
| 20 | MF | UKR | Maksym Zaderaka |
| 21 | FW | UKR | Danylo Kravchuk (on loan from LNZ Cherkasy) |
| 22 | DF | UKR | Illya Putrya (on loan from LNZ Cherkasy) |
| 24 | DF | UKR | Andriy Busko |
| 25 | MF | UKR | Vitaliy Hrusha |
| 30 | GK | UKR | Danylo Kanevtsev |
| 44 | MF | UKR | Vadym Vitenchuk |
| 70 | FW | SEN | Mor Talla |
| 77 | FW | CRO | Mihael Klepač |
| 94 | GK | UKR | Herman Penkov |
| 95 | DF | UKR | Petro Stasyuk |
| 97 | MF | UKR | Oleh Ilyin |

=== Out on loan ===
Note: Flags indicate national team as defined under FIFA eligibility rules; some limited exceptions apply. Players may hold more than one non-FIFA nationality.

| No. / Pos. / Nation / Player; 27 / MF / UKR / Ivan Tyshchenko (ay FK Grobiņa until 31 December 2026) | No. / Pos. / Nation / Player |

== International players ==
Had international caps for their respective countries. Players whose name is listed in bold represented their countries while playing for Bukovyna Chernivtsi.

Soviet Union

- (Soviet Union) Viktor Pasulko

Ukraine

- (Ukraine) Borys Finkel
- (Ukraine) Yuriy Shelepnytskyi

Europe

- (Azerbaijan) Renat Dadaşov
- (Moldova) **Vladimir Gaidamașciuc**

== Honours ==
- **Soviet Second League** (Group West)
  - Champions (1): 1990
- **Ukrainian First League**
  - Champions (1): 2025–26
  - Runner-up (1): 1995–96
- **Ukrainian Second League** (Group A)
  - Champions (2): 1999–2000, 2009–10
- **Chernivtsi Oblast championship**
  - Champions (6): 1959, 1960, 1961, 1965, 1966, 1976

Bukovyna also holds an all-time record of the most points earned in the Soviet Second League.

== League and cup history ==
=== Soviet Union ===
| Season | Div. | Pos. | Pl. | W | D | L | GS | GA | P | Domestic Cup | Others | | Notes |
|---|---|---|---|---|---|---|---|---|---|---|---|---|---|
Burevisnyk Chernivtsi
| 1956 | 3rd "Group 7" | **6** | 14 | 5 | 2 | 7 | 18 | 22 | 12 | | | | |
| 1957 | | | | | | | | | | | | | |
Avangard Chernovtsy / Avanhard Chernivtsi
| 1958 | 3rd "Group 5" | **2** | 14 | 9 | 4 | 1 | 37 | 9 | 22 | | UC | 1/4 finals | |
| 1959 | 3rd "Group 9" | **3** | 14 | 9 | 1 | 4 | 27 | 20 | 19 | | | | Promoted |
| 1960 | 2nd "Group 1" | **8** | 32 | 14 | 9 | 9 | 47 | 41 | 37 | | | | |
| 1961 | 2nd "Group 1" | **9** | 34 | 11 | 10 | 13 | 50 | 53 | 32 | | | | lost the 17th place game |
| 1962 | 2nd "Group 2" | **10** | 24 | 6 | 6 | 12 | 27 | 45 | 18 | | | | |
| 1962 | Finals | **29** (1) | 10 | 6 | 2 | 2 | 15 | 6 | 14 | | | | the 29th place tournament |
| 1963 | 3rd "Group 1" | **15** | 38 | 11 | 8 | 19 | 40 | 66 | 30 | | | | won the 29th place game |
| 1964 | 3rd "Group 2" | **11** | 30 | 9 | 8 | 13 | 32 | 46 | 26 | | | | |
| 1964 | Finals | **28** (4) | 10 | 4 | 2 | 4 | 14 | 15 | 10 | | | | the 25th place tournament |
Bukovina Chernovtsy / Bukovyna Chernivtsi
| 1965 | 3rd "Group 2" | **7** | 30 | 11 | 8 | 11 | 33 | 42 | 30 | | | | |
| 1965 | Finals | **20** (2) | 10 | 5 | 1 | 4 | 15 | 8 | 11 | | | | the 19th place tournament |
| 1966 | 3rd "Group 2" | **10** | 38 | 12 | 14 | 12 | 45 | 48 | 38 | | | | won the 19th place game |
| 1967 | 3rd "Group 1" | **14** | 40 | 11 | 12 | 17 | 44 | 53 | 34 | | | | |
| 1968 | 3rd "Group 1" | **2** | 42 | 25 | 10 | 7 | 66 | 26 | 60 | | | | qualified for finals |
| 1968 | Finals | **2** | 7 | 4 | 3 | 0 | 11 | 4 | 11 | | | | Promoted |
| 1969 | 2nd "Group 3" | **9** | 42 | 16 | 12 | 14 | 32 | 33 | 44 | | | | Relegated |
| 1970 | 3rd "Zone 1" | **8** | 42 | 17 | 12 | 13 | 45 | 39 | 46 | | | | |
| 1971 | 3rd "Zone 1" | **16** | 50 | 17 | 14 | 19 | 35 | 38 | 48 | | | | |
| 1972 | 3rd "Zone 1" | **21** | 46 | 10 | 16 | 20 | 32 | 62 | 36 | | UC | 1/8 finals | |
| 1973 | 3rd "Zone 1" | **14** | 44 | 14 | 7/5 | 18 | 44 | 52 | 35 | | UC | 1/16 finals | |
| 1974 | 3rd "Zone 6" | **12** | 38 | 14 | 10 | 14 | 51 | 45 | 38 | | UC | 1/16 finals | |
| 1975 | 3rd "Zone 6" | **10** | 32 | 10 | 12 | 10 | 34 | 38 | 32 | | UC | 1/4 finals | |
| 1976 | 3rd "Zone 6" | **14** | 38 | 11 | 12 | 15 | 29 | 34 | 34 | | UC | 1/4 finals | |
| 1977 | 3rd "Zone 2" | **9** | 44 | 19 | 11 | 14 | 46 | 29 | 49 | | | | |
| 1978 | 3rd "Zone 2" | **5** | 44 | 23 | 11 | 10 | 55 | 25 | 57 | | | | |
| 1979 | 3rd "Zone 2" | **5** | 46 | 24 | 10 | 12 | 55 | 32 | 58 | | | | |
| 1980 | 3rd "Zone 5" | **2** | 44 | 26 | 9 | 9 | 70 | 35 | 61 | | | | |
| 1981 | 3rd "Zone 5" | **4** | 44 | 23 | 9 | 12 | 58 | 28 | 55 | | | | |
| 1982 | 3rd "Zone 6" | **1** | 46 | 29 | 8 | 9 | 71 | 34 | 66 | | | | Champion of Ukraine |
| 1982 | Final "Group B" | **3** | 4 | 1 | 0 | 3 | 5 | 10 | 2 | | | | promotion tournament |
| 1983 | 3rd "Zone 6" | **6** | 50 | 23 | 14 | 13 | 79 | 52 | 60 | | | | |
| 1984 | 3rd "Zone 6" | **14** | 38 | 15 | 10 | 13 | 45 | 36 | 40 | | | | two stages |
| 1985 | 3rd "Zone 6" | **9** | 40 | 17 | 7 | 16 | 49 | 47 | 41 | | | | two stages |
| 1986 | 3rd "Zone 6" | **15** | 40 | 14 | 13 | 13 | 40 | 38 | 41 | | | | two stages |
| 1987 | 3rd "Zone 6" | **4** | 52 | 27 | 13 | 12 | 81 | 46 | 67 | | | | |
| 1988 | 3rd "Zone 6" | **1** | 50 | 27 | 16 | 7 | 85 | 31 | 70 | | | | Champion of Ukraine |
| 1988 | Final "Group 3" | **2** | 4 | 3 | 0 | 1 | 6 | 4 | 6 | | | | promotion tournament |
| 1989 | 3rd "Zone 6" | **2** | 52 | 29 | 18 | 5 | 71 | 26 | 76 | 1/32 finals | | | |
| 1990 | 3rd "West" | **1** | 50 | 29 | 17 | 4 | 87 | 34 | 75 | 1/64 finals | | | Promoted |
| 1991 | 2nd | **5** | 42 | 20 | 8 | 14 | 56 | 49 | 48 | 1/32 finals | | | |
| 1992 | No competition | | | | | | | | | 1/64 finals | | | |

=== Ukraine ===
| Season | Div. | Pos. | Pl. | W | D | L | GS | GA | P | Domestic Cup | Europe | | Notes |
|---|---|---|---|---|---|---|---|---|---|---|---|---|---|
| 1992 | **1st** (Vyshcha Liha "B") | **6** | 18 | 7 | 4 | 7 | 17 | 16 | **18** | 1/8 finals | | | |
| 1992–93 | **1st** (Vyshcha Liha) | **12** | 39 | 9 | 8 | 13 | 27 | 32 | **26** | 1/16 finals | | | |
| 1993–94 | **1st** (Vyshcha Liha) | **17** | 34 | 7 | 6 | 21 | 25 | 51 | **20** | 1/8 finals | | | Relegated |
| 1994–95 | **2nd** (Persha Liha) | **15** | 42 | 16 | 5 | 21 | 43 | 45 | **53** | 1/64 finals | | | |
| 1995–96 | **2nd** (Persha Liha) | **2** | 42 | 30 | 5 | 7 | 83 | 34 | **95** | 1/32 finals | | | |
| 1996–97 | **2nd** (Persha Liha) | **9** | 46 | 19 | 10 | 17 | 64 | 51 | **67** | 1/16 finals | | | |
| 1997–98 | **2nd** (Persha Liha) | **18** | 42 | 14 | 11 | 17 | 36 | 50 | **53** | 1/16 finals | | | |
| 1998–99 | **2nd** (Persha Liha) | **18** | 38 | 6 | 9 | 23 | 26 | 68 | **27** | 1/128 finals | | | Relegated |
| 1999–00 | **3rd** (Druga Liha "A" | **1** | 30 | 22 | 7 | 1 | 65 | 13 | **73** | 1/4 finals Second League Cup | | | Promoted |
| 2000–01 | **2nd** (Persha Liha) | **18** | 34 | 6 | 8 | 20 | 18 | 41 | **26** | 1/16 finals | | | Relegated |
| 2001–02 | **3rd** (Druga Liha "A" | **7** | 36 | 17 | 8 | 11 | 40 | 41 | **59** | 2nd round | | | |
| 2002–03 | **3rd** (Druga Liha "A" | **13** | 28 | 6 | 6 | 16 | 20 | 39 | **35** | 1/32 finals | | | |
| 2003–04 | **3rd** (Druga Liha "A" | **12** | 30 | 8 | 9 | 13 | 23 | 36 | **33** | 1/32 finals | | | |
| 2004–05 | **3rd** (Druga Liha "A" | **6** | 28 | 14 | 6 | 8 | 33 | 22 | **48** | 1/32 finals | | | |
| 2005–06 | **3rd** (Druga Liha "A" | **6** | 28 | 13 | 5 | 10 | 38 | 33 | **44** | 1/16 finals | | | |
| 2006–07 | **3rd** (Druga Liha "A" | **10** | 28 | 5 | 12 | 11 | 22 | 40 | **27** | 1/32 finals | | | |
| 2007–08 | **3rd** (Druga Liha "A" | **4** | 30 | 17 | 6 | 7 | 43 | 23 | **57** | did not enter | | | |
| 2008–09 | **3rd** (Druga Liha "A" | **9** | 32 | 14 | 2 | 16 | 29 | 39 | **44** | 1/64 finals | | | |
| 2009–10 | **3rd** (Druga Liha "A" | **1** | 20 | 15 | 3 | 2 | 35 | 12 | **48** | 1/64 finals | | | Promoted |
| 2010–11 | **2nd** (Persha Liha) | **7** | 34 | 17 | 5 | 12 | 48 | 45 | **56** | 1/32 finals | | | |
| 2011–12 | **2nd** (Persha Liha) | **6** | 34 | 15 | 12 | 7 | 38 | 29 | **57** | 1/8 finals | | | |
| 2012–13 | **2nd** (Persha Liha) | **4** | 34 | 16 | 10 | 8 | 49 | 33 | **58** | 1/32 finals | | | |
| 2013–14 | **2nd** (Persha Liha) | **12** | 30 | 10 | 6 | 14 | 26 | 36 | **36** | 1/16 finals | | | |
| 2014–15 | **2nd** (Persha Liha) | **16**_{/16} | 30 | 4 | 3 | 23 | 24 | 61 | **15** | 1/16 finals | | | Relegated |
| 2015–16 | **3rd** (Druga Liha) | **4**_{/14} | 26 | 13 | 8 | 5 | 39 | 22 | **47** | 1/32 finals | | | Promoted |
| 2016–17 | **2nd** (Persha Liha) | **16**_{/18} | 34 | 8 | 9 | 17 | 27 | 40 | **33** | 1/32 finals | | | Relegated |
| 2017–18 | **3rd** (Druga Liha "A" | **6**_{/10} | 27 | 9 | 7 | 11 | 32 | 40 | **34** | 1/64 finals | | | |
| 2018–19 | **3rd** (Druga Liha "A" | **10**_{/10} | 27 | 5 | 6 | 16 | 19 | 43 | **21** | 1/64 finals | | | Avoided relegation |
| 2019–20 | **3rd** (Druga Liha "A" | **8**_{/11} | 20 | 6 | 2 | 12 | 25 | 36 | **20** | 1/16 finals | | | |
| 2020–21 | **3rd** (Druga Liha "A" | **7**_{/13} | 24 | 9 | 5 | 10 | 27 | 31 | **32** | | | | |
the 2021–22 season did not end due to the full-scale invasion of the Russian Federation
| 2021–22 | **3rd** (Druga Liha "A" | **9**_{/15} | 17 | 6 | 5 | 6 | 20 | 17 | **23** | | | | Promoted |
| 2022–23 | **2nd**(Persha Liha "A") | **7**_{/8} | 14 | 2 | 3 | 9 | 9 | 21 | **9** | | | | Admitted to Relegation Group |
| 2022–23 | **2nd**(Persha Liha "REL") | **3**_{/8} | 14 | 5 | 6 | 3 | 18 | 14 | **21** | | | | |
| 2023–24 | **2nd**(Persha Liha "A") | **6**_{/10} | 18 | 6 | 3 | 9 | 16 | 23 | **21** | | | | Admitted to Relegation Group |
| 2023–24 | **2nd**(Persha Liha "REL") | **11**_{/10} | 28 | 12 | 5 | 11 | 38 | 29 | **41** | | | | - |
| 2024–25 | **2nd**(Persha Liha "A") | **4**/8 | 14 | 5 | 5 | 4 | 11 | 11 | **20** | 1/2 finals | - | - | Admitted to Promotion Group |
| 2024–25 | **2nd**(Persha Liha "PRO") | **7**/8 | 22 | 8 | 6 | 8 | 20 | 20 | **30** | 1/2 finals | - | - | - |
| 2025–26 | **2nd**(Persha Liha) | **1**/16 | 30 | 26 | 3 | 1 | 74 | 21 | **81** | 1/2 finals | - | - | Promoted to Ukrainian Premier League |
| 2026–27 | **1st**(Premier Liha) | 13/16 | 3 | 0 | 2 | 1 | 0 | 3 | 2 | 1/16 finals | - | - | TBD |

== Presidents ==
- 1993 – 1998 Vasyl Fedoriuk
- 2007 – 2010 Vasyl Fedoriuk
- 2019 – 2022 Vadym Zayats
- 2022 – present Andriy Safronyak

== Coaches ==
- Head coach – Serhiy Shyshchenko
- Assistant coach – Mykola Hibalyuk
- Assistant coach – Vitaliy Komarnytskyi
- Goalkeeping coach – Artem Kychak
- Fitness coach – Inna Desiuk

== Bukovyna-2 Chernivtsi ==
The Bukovyna-2 Chernivtsi is a reserve team that the club has occasionally fielded in various competitions.

| Season | Div. | Pos. | Pl. | W | D | L | GS | GA | P | Domestic Cup | Europe | Notes |
|---|---|---|---|---|---|---|---|---|---|---|---|---|
| 2013 | 4th (Amatory) | **6** | 10 | 2 | 1 | 7 | 7 | 15 | **7** | | | |
