= Hennadiy Makarov =

Soviet footballer and coach

Gennadiy Makarov
Personal information
- Full name: Gennadiy Efimovich Makarov
- Date of birth: 10 July 1939 (age 87)
- Place of birth: Kacha, Crimean ASSR, Soviet Union
- Position: Midfielder

Senior career*
Years	Team	Apps	(Gls)
1964	FC Spartak Smolensk		

Managerial career
- 1967–1969: FC Iskra Smolensk (ass't)
- 1970: FC Iskra Smolensk
- 1971–1972: FC Iskra Smolensk (ass't)
- 1973–1975: FC Iskra Smolensk
- 1975–1979: FC Atlantyka Sevastopol
- 1986: FC Atlantyka Sevastopol (ass't)
- 1987–1990: FC Chayka Sevastopol
- 1991: SC Tavriya Simferopol
- 1992: FC Naftovyk Okhtyrka (ass't)
- 1992–1993: FC Naftovyk Okhtyrka
- 1993–1994: FC Chayka Sevastopol
- * Club domestic league appearances and goals

Hennadiy Makarov (Ukrainian: Геннадій Юхимович Макаров; 10 July 1939) is a former professional Soviet football midfielder and coach.
