= FC Chayka-VMS Sevastopol =

Chayka-VMS Sevastopol
- Full name: Football Club Chayka-VMS Sevastopol
- Founded: 1964
- Dissolved: 2002
- Ground: Sports Complex Sevastopol
- Capacity: 3,500
- 2001–02: 18th
Home colours	Away colours

FC Chayka-VMS Sevastopol was a Ukrainian football club based in Sevastopol. In 2001–02, the club took part in the Ukrainian Second League for the last time. FC Chaika also represented the Ukrainian Navy.

The club's colours were white and blue.

== History ==
Previous names:

- 1964–1965: Chaika Balaklava (Ukrainian: «Чайка» Балаклава)
- 1966–1970: Chaika Sevastopol (Ukrainian: «Чайка» Севастополь)
- 1971–1974: Avanhard Sevastopol (Ukrainian: «Авангард» Севастополь)
- 1975: Khvylya Sevastopol (Ukrainian: «Хвиля» Севастополь)
- 1976–1986: Atlantyka Sevastopol (Ukrainian: «Атлантика» Севастополь)
- 1987–1996: Chaika Sevastopol (Ukrainian: «Чайка» Севастополь)
  - 1997–2000: Chernomorets Sevastopol
- 2001–2002: Chaika-VMS Sevastopol (Ukrainian: «Чайка-ВМС» Севастополь)

In 1964 the club presented the city and as Chayka Balaklava again competed in Soviet Second League. In 1966, after the merger Balaklava to Sevastopol has changed its name to Chayka Sevastopol. In 1967 the club finished in fourth place high in their area, but the following season did not join the professional tournament.

It was only in 1971 under the name Avanhard Sevastopol that the club competed in the Second League, Zone 1 The club also called Khvylya Sevastopol and Atlantyka Sevastopol in 1987 to return to the old name Chayka Sevastopol.

In 1990–1991, after yet another reorganization of the Soviet Union league, the club played in the Soviet Second Lower League, Zone 1.

In Ukraine's first championship competition in 1992, the club began in the Ukrainian First League, the first subgroup. Club took the penultimate 13th place and were relegated to the Ukrainian Second League. In the 1995–96 season, the club ranked 12th in their group, but the financial problems meant that ig did not join the tournament the following season.

In 1997, the club has been replaced with Chernomorets Sevastopol (representing the Russian Black Sea Fleet) as a participant in Ukraine's final tournament of amateur teams qualified for the Second League Group B. In the 1999–2000 season, took 11th place in their group, but again by the financial problems did not join the tournament in the next season.

In 2001, already as Chayka-VMS Sevastopol (VMS – abbreviation for Navy (Military Marine Forces)) has been reported for the third time the tournament in the Second League. He finished last in 18th place in its group and was deprived of a professional status.

The club disbanded in 2002, founded a new club PFC Sevastopol who continued the tradition of football.

== Coaches ==
- (Soviet Union) Yuriy Lis (1971)
- (Soviet Union) Viktor Fomin (1973–1974)
- (Soviet Union) Anatoliy Zayayev (1981–1982)
- (Soviet Union) Valentin Tugarin (1983–1986)
- (Soviet Union) Hennadiy Makarov (1987–1990)
- (Soviet Union) A. Pavlyukov (1991)
- (Soviet Union) / (Ukraine) Oleksiy Rudyka (1991–1992)
- (Ukraine) Vasyl Borys (1992–1993)
- (Ukraine) Hennadiy Makarov (1993–1994)
- (Ukraine) Oleh Zhylin (1994–1995)
- (Ukraine) Valeriy Petrov (1995–1996)
- (Ukraine) Vasyl Borys (1997–1999)
- (Ukraine) Valeriy Petrov (1999)
- (Ukraine) Serhiy Diyev (2000) (caretaker)
- (Ukraine) Yevhen Repenkov (2001–2002)

== League and cup history ==
=== Soviet Union ===
Season	Div.	Pos.	Pl.	W	D	L	GS	GA	P	Domestic Cup	Europe	Notes
Chaika Balaklava
1964	3rd Class B, Ukrainian SSR Gr. 2	7_{/16}	30	12	6	12	30	38	30	Zone 2, Ukrainian SSR 1/2 finals		Final stage, Places 19–24 (20th)
1965	3rd Class B, Ukrainian SSR Gr. 1	13_{/16}	30	10	7	13	25	35	27	Zone 1, Ukrainian SSR 1/4 finals		Final stage, Places 31–36 (32nd)
Chaika Sevastopol
1966	3rd Class B, Ukrainian SSR Gr. 2	5_{/20}	38	15	14	9	40	29	44			Final stage, Places 7–8 (7th)
1967	3rd Class B, Ukrainian SSR Gr. 2	4_{/21}	40	20	14	6	48	21	54	Zone 2, Ukrainian SSR 1/2 finals		Withdrew
...
Avanhard Sevastopol
1971	3rd Second League Gr. 1	21_{/26}	50	14	17	19	37	54	45			
1972	3rd Second League Gr. 1	13_{/24}	46	15	17	14	33	31	47			
1973	3rd Second League Gr. 1	7_{/23}	44	16	16	12	44	40	45			
1974	3rd Second League Gr. 6	13_{/20}	38	14	9	15	46	47	37			
Khvylia Sevastopol
1975	3rd Second League Gr. 6	14_{/17}	32	12	5	15	38	54	29			
Antlantyka Sevastopol
1976	3rd Second League Gr. 6	20_{/20}	38	11	6	21	42	61	28			
1977	3rd Second League Gr. 2	13_{/23}	44	15	11	18	49	46	41			
1978	3rd Second League Gr. 2	14_{/23}	44	13	13	18	49	54	39			
1979	3rd Second League Gr. 2	12_{/24}	46	17	9	20	54	62	43			
1980	3rd Second League Gr. 5	9_{/23}	44	18	11	15	53	49	47			
1981	3rd Second League Gr. 5	6_{/23}	44	18	15	11	64	40	51			
1982	3rd Second League Gr. 6	6_{/24}	46	22	12	12	68	39	56			
1983	3rd Second League Gr. 6	14_{/26}	50	17	13	20	53	50	47			
1984	3rd Second League Gr. 6	22_{/26}	38	9	13	16	39	49	31			
1985	3rd Second League Gr. 6	11_{/28}	40	16	9	15	46	44	41			
1986	3rd Second League Gr. 6	27_{/28}	40	10	7	23	37	60	27			
Chaika Sevastopol
1987	3rd Second League Gr. 6	15_{/27}	52	20	9	23	57	63	49			
1988	3rd Second League Gr. 6	7_{/26}	50	20	16	14	68	56	56			
1989	3rd Second League Gr. 6	22_{/27}	52	15	14	23	57	79	44			Reorganization of competitions
1990	4th Second League B Gr. 1	13_{/19}	36	11	8	17	35	46	30	1/64 finals		
1991	4th Second League B Gr. 1	22_{/26}	50	13	15	22	58	77	41			Reorganization of competitions

=== Ukraine ===
Season	Div.	Pos.	Pl.	W	D	L	GS	GA	P	Domestic Cup	Europe	Notes
Chaika Sevastopol
1992	2nd First League Gr. A	13_{/14}	26	7	4	15	19	39	18	1/32 finals		Relegated
1992–93	3rd Second League	6_{/18}	34	13	10	11	57	45	36	1/32 finals		
1993–94	3rd Second League	15_{/22}	42	14	9	19	49	60	37	1/64 finals		
1994–95	3rd Second League	12_{/22}	42	16	8	18	42	45	56	1/64 finals		
1995–96	3rd Second League Gr. B	12_{/21}	38	17	7	14	55	39	58	1/16 finals		Withdrew
Chernomorets Sevastopol
1996–97	4th Amateur League Gr. 6	1_{/6}	8	7	1	0	5	2	22			Final Gr. B (2_{/3}); promoted
1997–98	3rd Second League Gr. B	9_{/17}	32	10	11	11	32	33	41	1/256 finals		
1998–99	3rd Second League Gr. B	8_{/16}	34	13	10	11	36	30	49	1/128 finals		
1999–00	3rd Second League Gr. B	11_{/14}	34	11	8	15	30	28	41	Second League Cup, 1/32 finals		Withdrew
...
Chaika-VMS Sevastopol
2001–02	3rd Second League Gr. B	18_{/18}	34	11	7	16	38	48	40			Withdrew
