= Ukraina Moloda =

Ukrainian newspaper

- Publisher: Presa Ukrayiny
- Launched: 1991; 35 years ago
- Language: Ukrainian
- City: Kyiv
- Country: Ukraine
- Circulation: 99,000
- Website: umoloda.kyiv.ua

Ukraina Moloda (Ukrainian: Україна молода, lit. 'Young Ukraine') is a daily Ukrainian-language newspaper based in Kyiv with a circulation of 99,000. It is published by State Company "Presa Ukrayiny". It is the only countrywide printed publication in Ukraine dedicated to information on political topics.

== Overview ==
Ukraina Moloda is a local daily newspaper for Kyiv covering local news, sports, business, politics and community events.

Created in 1991 initially it was created as a newspaper of the Central Committee of the Communist Party of Ukraine steered towards younger generation, but already in August of the same year it became independent [from the party].

Ukraina Moloda supports pro-Western policies. It also supported former president Viktor Yushchenko, and was highly critical of Yushchenko's predecessor, Leonid Kuchma. It offers both domestic and international news reporting, analysis, and interviews.

During the 1990s and early 2000s, the newspaper was critical of the communist party, and former members of the communist party which continued their political careers under new parties. The newspaper was also noted as using Soviet neologism and clichés to satirize these former communist politicians.

Ukraina Moloda is a member of the Ukrainian Association of Press Publishers (UAPP).

In 2006, chairman of the Verkhovna Rada Oleksandr Moroz won a court case against "Ukraina Moloda".

In the beginning of 2018 the editorial staff of the newspaper was asked to vacate its leased office at "Presa Ukrayiny".

Following the Russian invasion of Ukraine, the newspaper continued to emerge in print, unlike most similar publications in Ukraine, which have since only been published online.

== Articles ==
- "Ukraina Moloda": "Bihus-gate" is the FSB special operation or the Kolomoisky diversion («Україна молода»: «Бігус-гейт» - спецоперація ФСБ або диверсія Коломойського). Glavcom. 16 March 2019
- Start to say "No" (Почніть говорити «НІ»). Ludmila Kalabukha website.

== See also ==
- List of newspapers in Ukraine
