= Serhiy Melnyk (politician) =

Ukrainian politician (b. 1965)

Serhii Melnyk
- Сергій Мельник
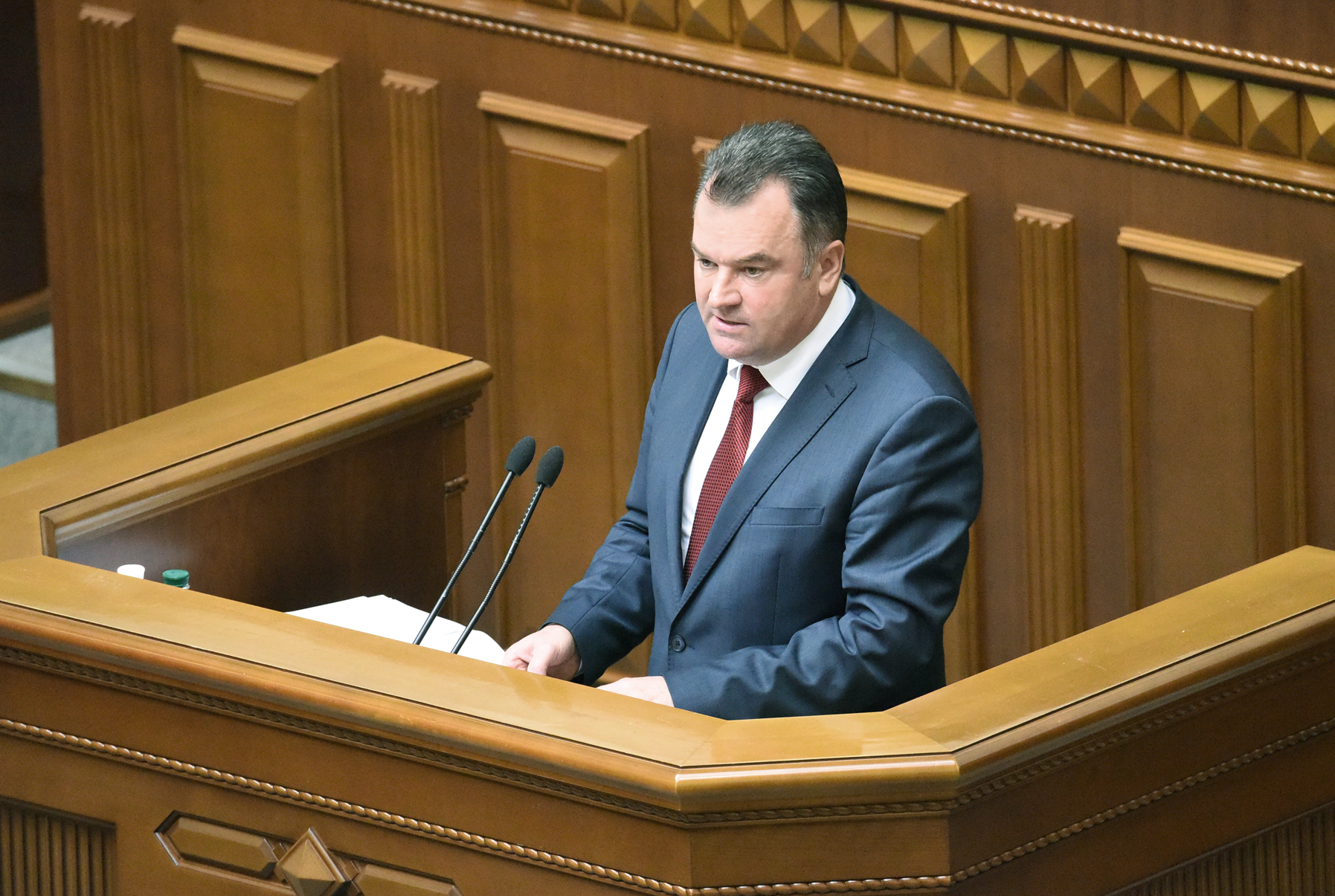

People's Deputy of Ukraine
- In office 27 November 2014 – 29 August 2019
- Preceded by: Oleh Lukashuk
- Succeeded by: Mykola Stefanchuk
- Constituency: Khmelnytskyi Oblast, No. 187

Personal details
- Born: 22 February 1965 (age 61) Molomolyntsi, Ukrainian SSR, Soviet Union (now Ukraine)
- Party: Petro Poroshenko Bloc
- Spouse: Tetiana Vasylivna
- Children: Yuriy Melnyk
- Parent(s): Ivan Melnyk; Olha Melnyk
- Education: Khmelnytskyi National University

Serhiy Ivanovych Melnyk (Ukrainian: Сергій Іванович Мельник; born 22 February 1965) is a Ukrainian politician who served as a People's Deputy of Ukraine in the 8th Ukrainian Verkhovna Rada.

== Biography ==
Serhiy Melnyk was born in the village of Molomolyntsi in rural Khmelnytskyi Raion, Khmelnytskyi Oblast, Ukraine. From 1981 to 1984, he pursued his studies at Khmelnytskyi cooperative technical school, and starting from 1984, he attended Khmelnytskyi technological Institute, where he completed his degree in "Bookkeeping and Analysis of Economic Activity" in 1990. He also served in the army from 1984 to 1986 before resuming his studies at Khmelnytskyi Technological Institute.

Between 1990 and 1992, Melnyk worked as an economist in the plan-finances department at Khmelnytskyi Regional Housing Communal Administration. From 1992 to 1993, he held the position of a leading bookkeeper at the Administration of Housing-Communal Household of Khmelnytsky Oblast State Administration.

In 1994, Melnyk assumed the role of Vice-head of the Financial Department and the Head of Economic Analysis and Planning Department at Khmelnytskyi City Executive Committee. In 1998, he was appointed Vice-head of Khmelnytsky's Mayor Office, overseeing executive power body activities as the Head of the Financial Department. Since 2000, he has been serving as the Head of Home Finances Department. From July 2002, he has held the position of the Head of the Department on Budget at the Ministry of Finance.

Melnyk was also appointed as the Head of The Main Financial Administration of Khmelnytskyi Oblast Administration in the same year and became the Vice-head of Khmelnytskyi Oblast State Administration in 2003. In July 2006 he was elected Mayor of Khmelnytskyi and was reelected in October 2010.

In the 2014 Ukrainian parliamentary election, Serhiy Melnyk was successfully elected as a People's Deputy of Ukraine of the VIII convocation. He ran as an independent candidate in single-mandate constituency 187, located in Khmelnytskyi. Melnyk emerged as the winner of the election in that constituency, securing 33.76% of the vote. The runner-up, Vitalii Movchan of the Petro Poroshenko Bloc, gained 18.19% of the vote. Once in parliament, Melnyk assumed the position of Vice-head of the Committee of the Verkhovna Rada on budget issues and became a member of the Petro Poroshenko Bloc "Solidarity" faction.

During the 2019 Ukrainian parliamentary election, Melnyk once again competed as an independent candidate for reelection in single-mandate constituency 187. However, he was unsuccessful in this attempt. Mykola Stefanchuk, representing the Servant of the People party, emerged as the winner of the constituency, receiving 35.83% of the votes. The runner-up, Vitalii Didenko from the Svoboda party, gained 29.44% of the votes. Melnyk finished in third place with 7.33% of the votes.

== Awards and honours ==
- In 2006 was awarded the Order of Equal-to-the-Apostles Knight Volodymyr, III class.
- In accordance with Ukraine's President's decree in 2007 he was awarded the honour of «Merited Economist of Ukraine».
- On 21 November 2014, in accordance with a decision of Khmelnytskyi City Council he was awarded the certificate of Merit of Khmelnytskyi City Council, І class
- 22 January 2019 Ukraine's Order of Merit, II class,№14/2019.

== Notes ==
Political offices
| Preceded by Mykola Prystupa | Mayor of Khmelnytskyi; 2006–2014 | Succeeded by Oleksandr Symchyshyn (since 2015) |
