= FC CSKA Kyiv =

CSKA Kyiv
- Full name: Central Sports Club of the Army Kyiv
- Nicknames: The Armymen; The Cadets
- Founded: 1934, as (SKA Kyiv)
- Ground: CSK ZSU Stadium, Kyiv
- Capacity: 12,000
- Owner(s): SK Army (1934–1992); Central Sports Club of Armed Forces of Ukraine (CSK ZSU) (1992–2001)
- Chairman: Yuriy Puzhaylo
- Manager: Ruslan Perizhok
- League: Kyiv Amateur Championship
- Website: cska.in.ua
Home colours	Away colours

FC CSKA Kyiv (Ukrainian: "ЦСКА Київ") is a Ukrainian football club, until 2001 of the Central Sports Club of the Armed Forces of Ukraine, which is government sponsored by the Ministry of Defense. Between 1994–2001 it had a farm team CSKA-2 Kyiv, which later was renamed into Arsenal Kyiv.

After reorganization in 2001, the football section "FC CSKA Kyiv" was privately sponsored until 2009 when it withdrew from the professional league due to lack of financial support.

== History ==
=== DO/SKA Kyiv (1934–1992) ===
The football team has founded in 1934 in Kharkiv as part of the Soviet Officers' Club (later CSKA), receiving the name UVO Kharkiv (Ukrainian: Український Військовий Округ, Ukrainian Military District – Kharkiv). During the Soviet regime the team was part of the Soviet Armed Forces sports society. At the end of 1934 the team was transferred to Kyiv. Its name has changed to DO Kyiv (Ukrainian: Дім офіцерів, Officers' Club – Kyiv). In 1947–1956 the team was called ODO Kyiv (District Officers' Club – Kyiv) and in 1952, under this name, the team reached the semifinal stage of the Soviet National Cup. In 1957, the team played under the name OSK Kyiv (District Sports Club – Kyiv). The year of 1957 is considered the official year of establishment of CSK ZSU. In 1957–1959 the Kyivan army men football team was called SKVO Kyiv (Sports Club Military District – Kyiv) and in 1960–1971 – SKA Kyiv (Sports Club of Army – Kyiv). In 1972, the team moved to Chernihiv and changed its name to SK Chernihiv and had moved back to Kyiv in 1976 as SKA. In 1981–1982, the team had its last Soviet First League stint at the second level of Soviet football.

=== CSKA Kyiv (1992–1994) ===
FC CSKA Kyiv was created in place of the Soviet football team SKA Kyiv on 15 December 1992 during the reorganization of the Ukrainian military. Its first season in 1992 the club finished under its old name SKA Kyiv which was changed during the summer of 1992 to ZS – Oriana (abbr. Armed Forces – Oriana). In 1993 team changed its name to ZS – Oriana (Armed Forces – Oriana) and then to CSK ZSU (Central Sport Club of Armed Forces of Ukraine). The highest place it reached in the Ukrainian championships was the fifth in the First League.

=== Second team of CSKA-Borysfen & Arsenal (1994–2001) ===
In 1994, FC CSKA Kyiv while being in the Third League was promoted to the Second League. Borysfen Boryspil that was playing in the 1994–95 Ukrainian First League in the mid-season merged with the Central Sports Club of the Armed Forces of Ukraine under the name FC CSKA-Borysfen Kyiv. At that time the Central Sports Club of the Armed Forces of Ukraine obtained two professional teams, one in the Ukrainian First League, while the other in the Ukrainian Second League. FC CSKA Kyiv was kept as the Borysfen's second team in the Second League. In 1995 FC CSKA-Borysfen Kyiv was promoted to the Ukrainian Higher League.

Upon conclusion of the 1995–96 Ukrainian Premier League season Borysfen was omitted from the name and the reserve team, which coincidentally gained promotion to the First League now, automatically became CSKA-2 Kyiv. In 1997 Boryspil team was restored first on the Amateur Level and then gaining professional status once again.

In 2001, the Central Sports Club of the Armed Forces of Ukraine sold the club. The first team was bought by the Kyivan municipal administration and reformed into the new Kyivan club "FC Arsenal Kyiv". In turn, the second team was sold to another owner and reverted to the name of CSKA Kyiv, continuing to play in the Ukrainian First League.

=== CSKA Kyiv ===
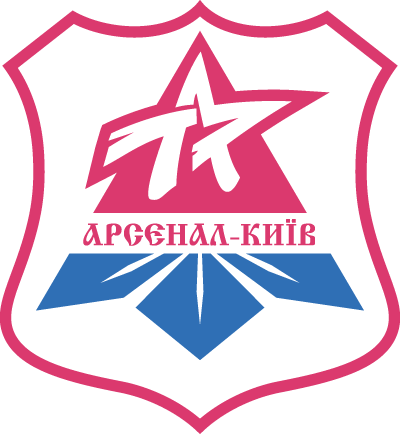
Original FC Arsenal Kyiv logo containing some CSKA Kyiv elements

Since 2001, FC CSKA Kyiv played in the Ukrainian First League until 2008, when it was relegated to the Ukrainian Second League. In 2009, FC CSKA Kyiv went bankrupt and dissolved.

Emblem of CSKA Kyiv

=== Reformation as an amateur club (since 2013) ===
CSKA was absent from football for 4 years. In 2013, the amateur football team Atlant Kyiv The public organization "CSKA of Ukraine" established an amateur club called CSKA Kyiv. Since 2013, CSKA plays in the Premier Division of the Kyiv Region Championship Football League. In 2015, CSKA Kyiv led by Viktor Ishchenko applied for the Makarov Memorial tournament. The new CSKA team is represented by the Republican College of Physical Education.

=== 2021 ===
The team participated in the championship and cup of the KSRFF (Kyiv-Svyatoshinsky Regional Football Federation).

== Naming history ==
- 1934 – UVO Kharkov
- 1934 – DO Kyiv
- 1947 – ODO Kyiv
- 1957 – OSK Kyiv
- 1957 – SKVO Kyiv
- 1960 – SKA Kyiv
- 1971 – SK Chernihiv
- 1976 – SKA Kyiv
- 1992 – FC ZS-Oriyana Kyiv
- 1993 – FC CSK ZSU Kyiv
- 1994 – FC CSKA Kyiv
- 1995 – FC CSKA-2 Kyiv
- 2001 – FC CSKA Kyiv

== Honours ==
=== SKA Kyiv ===
- Ukrainian SSR Championship
  - Winners (4): 1949, 1951, 1980, 1983
  - Runners up (5): 1946, 1964, 1965, 1977, 1979
- Cup of the Ukrainian SSR
  - Winners (1): 1976
  - Runner up (1): 1954

== Domestic competitions ==
=== Soviet Union ===
==== SKA Kyiv ====
Season	Div.	Pos.	Pl.	W	D	L	GS	GA	P	Domestic Cup	Europe	Notes
UDKA Kyiv
1936	Rep 1	3	4	2	0	2	5	5	8			UkrSSR
ODO Kyiv
1947	2	5	24	13	1	10	56	34	27			Zone UkrSSR
1948	2	2	14	9	4	1	27	14	22			Subgroup B
1948	2	3	3	1	0	2	3	6	2			Final of UkrSSR
1949	2	3	34	20	8	6	93	34	48			Zone UkrSSR
1950-51	Club is idle											
1952	2	5	4	0	3	1	2	4	3			Group Baku
1952	2	14	8	4	0	4	13	9	8			Final for 10-18 places
1953	2	Club withdrew										Zone 3
1954	2	11	22	6	4	12	34	45	16			Zone 3
1955	2	3	30	14	8	8	44	27	36			Zone 1
1956	2	6	34	15	9	10	43	27	39			Zone 1
OSK Kyiv / SKVO Kyiv
1957	2	8	34	14	9	11	42	36	37			Zone 2
1958	2	8	30	11	9	10	44	38	31			Zone 3
1959-60	Club is idle											
SKA Kyiv
1961	2	12	36	11	11	14	45	41	33			Ukrainian Zone 2
1961	2	24	2	0	1	1	3	6	1			Ukrainian Final for 23 place
1962	2	3	24	10	10	4	39	21	30			Ukrainian Zone 2
1962	2	10	10	5	1	4	18	17	11			Ukrainian Final for 7–17 places, League Reorganization
1963	3	17	38	16	12	10	54	26	44			Ukrainian Zone 1
1964	3	1	30	21	4	5	55	19	46			Ukrainian Zone 2
1964	3	2	10	8	0	2	15	8	16			Ukrainian Final for 1–6 places
1965	3	1	30	22	4	4	65	22	48			Ukrainian Zone 1
1965	3	2	10	7	1	2	23	16	15			Ukrainian Final for 1–6 places
1966	2	2	34	17	7	10	42	36	41			Zone 2
1967	2	1	38	20	11	7	47	27	51			Zone 2
1967	2	3	4	0	2	2	3	6	2			Final for 1–3 places
1968	2	2	40	23	11	6	58	23	57			Zone 1
1969	2	2	42	18	16	8	51	30	52			Zone 3
1970	2	19	42	11	10	21	39	50	32			Relegated
1971	3	17	50	15	17	18	43	44	47			Zone 1

==== SK Chernihiv ====
Season	Div.	Pos.	Pl.	W	D	L	GS	GA	P	Domestic Cup	Europe	Notes
Moved to Chernihiv instead of dissolved FC Desna Chernihiv
1972	3	10	46	19	14	13	59	44	52			Zone 1
1973	3	11	44	18	8	18	63	56	38			Zone 1
1974	3	6	38	17	9	12	63	46	43			Zone 6
1975	3	4	32	12	13	7	41	33	37			Zone 6
Moved back to Kyiv

==== SKA Kyiv ====
Season	Div.	Pos.	Pl.	W	D	L	GS	GA	P	Domestic Cup		Notes
1976	3	11	38	12	11	15	36	44	35			Zone 6
1977	3	2	44	26	11	7	63	32	63			Zone 2
1978	3	3	44	23	14	7	71	29	60			Zone 2
1979	3	2	46	26	12	8	65	32	64			Zone 2
1980	3	1	44	28	9	7	83	33	65			Q Finals (Zone 5)
1980	3	1	4	2	2	0	8	5	6			Promoted (Final 3)
1981	2	17	46	16	10	20	59	71	42			
1982	2	21	42	5	10	27	31	81	20			Relegated
1983	3	1	50	28	16	6	91	49	72			Zone 6
1983	3	3	4	1	0	3	6	7	2			Zone 6, Final 1
1984	3	3	24	10	8	6	38	22	28			Zone 6, 1st Group
1984	3	4	36	19	7	10	65	37	45			Zone 6, finals
1985	3	3	26	11	10	5	38	28	32			Zone 6, 1st Group
1985	3	4	40	19	11	10	62	46	49			Zone 6, finals
1986	3	1	26	14	6	6	39	21	34			Zone 6, 2nd Group
1986	3	3	40	20	9	11	65	42	49			Zone 6, finals
1987	3	27	52	11	15	26	41	67	37			Relegated
1988	4th	1	22	15	4	3	55	16	34			to Final group
1988	4th	4	5	1	2	2	10	8	4			
1989	4th	1	24	18	4	2	56	15	40			to Final group
1989	4th	1	5	3	1	1	13	6	7			Promoted (Finals)
1990	3rd (lower)	11	36	14	4	18	40	41	32			
1991	3rd (lower)	21	50	11	20	19	48	60	42	Ukr	1/16 finals	fall of USSR

=== Ukraine ===
==== CSKA Kyiv ====
Season	Div.	Pos.	Pl.	W	D	L	GS	GA	P	Domestic Cup	Europe	Notes
SKA Kyiv
1992	2nd "A"	14	26	3	3	20	14	45	9	1/32 finals		Relegated
ZS Oriyana / CSK ZSU
1992–93	3rd	18	34	9	7	18	27	50	25	1/64 finals		Relegated
1993–94	3rd (lower)	11	34	14	4	16	45	42	32	Did not qualify		CSK ZSU Kyiv
CSCA Kyiv
1994–95	3rd (lower)	1	42	32	5	5	81	28	101	1/32 finals		Promoted
1995–96	3rd "A"	1	40	27	7	9	61	27	89	1/16 finals		Promoted
CSKA-2 Kyiv
1996–97	2nd	19	46	15	9	22	37	56	54			
1997–98	2nd	12	42	18	5	19	56	44	59			
1998–99	2nd	11	38	14	10	14	45	48	52			
1999–00	2nd	5	34	16	6	12	38	26	54			
2000–01	2nd	8	34	15	1	18	36	43	46			
CSKA-2 / CSKA Kyiv
2001–02	2nd	14	34	10	9	15	33	38	41	1/32 finals		Changed back to CSKA
2002–03	2nd	14	34	10	11	13	33	38	41	1/32 finals		
2003–04	2nd	11	34	12	6	16	29	39	42	1/16 finals		
2004–05	2nd	7	34	15	6	13	28	38	51	1/8 finals		
2005–06	2nd	15	34	8	8	18	25	52	32	1/16 finals		
2006–07	2nd	16	36	10	8	18	24	44	38	1/32 finals		
2007–08	2nd	19	38	7	6	25	36	74	27	1/32 finals		Relegated
2008–09	3rd "A"	4	32	18	3	11	38	23	57	1/16 finals		
2009–10	3rd "A"	-	3	1	0	2	6	6	0	1/16 finals		(−3) Withdrew, results removed

==== CSKA-2 Kyiv / CSKA-3 Kyiv / KLO Bucha ====
Season	Div.	Pos.	Pl.	W	D	L	GS	GA	P	Domestic Cup	Europe	Notes
1995–96	4th	4	6	0	1	5	1	11	1			as CSKA-2 Kyiv
1996-1999	Club idle											
1999	4th	3	10	4	1	5	10	18	13			as CSKA-3 Kyiv
1999-2003	Club idle											
2003	4th	2	10	5	2	3	16	12	17			as KLO-CSKA Bucha
2003	4th	5	8	2	2	4	5	10	8			as KLO Bucha
2003	4th	4	3	0	0	3	1	12	0			as KLO Bucha

- In 1999–2000 CSKA-3 Kyiv was coached by Oleksandr Shcherbakov

==== CSKA Kyiv (predecessor of Arsenal Kyiv) ====
After being split from CSKA-Borysfen, the new CSKA was owned by company Kyiv–Donbas until in 2001 it was sold to the mayor of Kyiv, Oleksandr Omelchenko.

Season	Div.	Pos.	Pl.	W	D	L	GS	GA	P	Domestic Cup	Europe		Notes
Previous	Refer to FC Boryspil												
1995–96	1st	4	34	15	11	8	47	27	56	1/16 finals			as CSKA-Borysfen Kyiv
1996–97	1st	11	30	9	8	13	33	35	35	1/2 finals			
1997–98	1st	13	30	9	6	15	30	35	33	Runner-up			
1998–99	1st	7	30	11	10	9	37	35	43	1/8 finals	CWC	1st round	
1999–00	1st	10	30	9	8	13	31	36	35	1/4 finals			
2000–01	1st	6	26	10	10	6	30	23	40	Runner-up			
After	Refer to FC Arsenal Kyiv												

== European competitions ==
UEFA Cup Winners Cup

Season	Round	Club	Home	Away	Aggr.
1998–99	Qualifying round	(Republic of Ireland) Cork City	2–1	0–2	2–3

UEFA Europa League

Season	Round	Club	Home	Away	Aggr.
2001–02	Qualifying round	(Finland) FC Jokerit	2–0	2–0	4–0
	First round	(Serbia and Montenegro) Red Star Belgrade	3–2	0–0	3–2
	Second round	(Belgium) Club Brugge K.V.	0–2	0–5	0–7

== Football kits and sponsors ==
Years	Football kit	Shirt sponsor	Notes
1998–99	Reebok	Ukrspetsexport	
1999–00	Reebok	–	–
2000–01	Puma	Shchedryi Dar	

== Owners ==
- prior to 2001 – Central Sports Club of Armed Forces of Ukraine (state financed)
- 2001–2009 – private
- since 2013 – CSKA of Ukraine (public organization)

== See also ==
- FC Arsenal Kyiv
- FC Borysfen Boryspil
