= FC Zirka Kropyvnytskyi =

Zirka Kropyvnytskyi
- Full name: FC Zirka Kropyvnytskyi
- Nickname: "Zirka" – Star
- Founded: 1911
- Ground: "Zirka" Stadium, Kropyvnytskyi
- Capacity: 14,628
- Chairman: Maksym Berezkin
- Manager: Samir Hasanov
- League: Ukrainian Amateur League
- 2023–24: Ukrainian Amateur League, Group 2, 6th of 12
- Website: fczirka.com.ua
| Home colours | Away colours |

FC Zirka Kropyvnytskyi (Ukrainian: ФК "Зірка Кропивницький") is a Ukrainian amateur football club from Kropyvnytskyi, Kirovohrad Oblast, with its team currently playing in the Ukrainian Amateur League.

The club traces its history of a football team that existed at the British factory of Elvorti (Elworthy) since 1911. After the Bolshevik Revolution, the factory was nationalized and converted into Soviet factory "Chervona Zirka", and likewise, the former team was dissolved, and the Soviet football team Chervona Zirka was formed in 1922. The club's professional football history started in 1958 when it was admitted to the Class B competitions.

== History ==
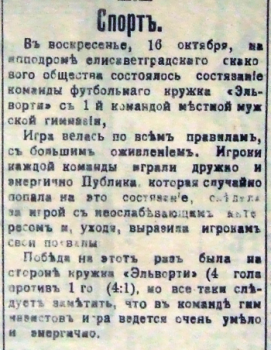
Newspaper article of 1911 about a game between the Sports Society Elvorti and the 1st Team of Male Gymnasium

The club traces its history back to the former sports club Elvorti Yelizavetgrad that was founded in 1911 at the Elvorti Factory owned by Robert Pearce Elworthy. Since 1907 the factory had its own football field.

After start of World War I and the Ukrainian-Soviet War, most sports events in the region were suspended and in 1917 the club dissolved. Sports competitions were resumed in Lyzavetghrad in 1921 that saw participation of a team.

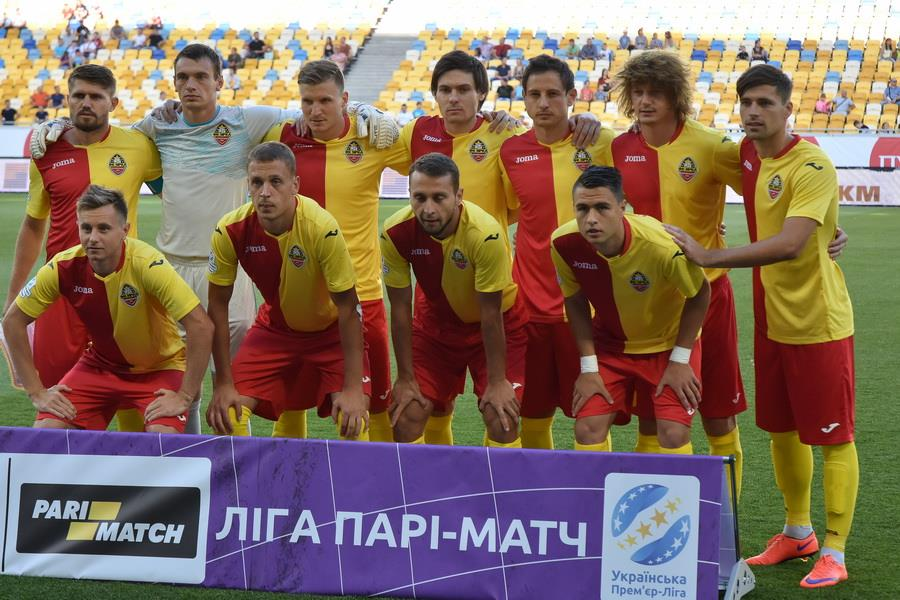
Zirka Kropyvnytsky in 2016-17

In 1922, based on the former sports club Elvorti Yelizavetgrad were created two Soviet sports clubs Chervona Zirka (Red Star) and Chervony Profintern (Red Profintern) that participated in Soviet competition. The sports club Zirka was a multi-athletic club which beside football included volleyball, gymnastics, track and field, wrestling, fitness and others. After the dissolution of the Soviet Union, some of Zirka's club shields contained 1922 as the club's year of establishment as well as a sketch of the fortress of St. Elizabeth which was built as a star fort. In 1924 there were established local competitions of Zinovyivsk Okruha and they were accounted for some 16 teams.

In 1928 Chervona Zirka changed its name to Metallist Zinovyevsk (Metalist Zinovyivsk) and in 1934 – Selmash Kirovo (Silmash Kirove). To expand its operations and development, the sports club obtained the building of the factory theater which was transformed into a physical culture center with halls for sports competitions, wrestling, boxing, gymnastics. In 1928 the Zinovyivsk city team took part at the republican competitions among city teams for the first time. In 1931 in the Soviet Union was introduced the GTO athletic standards.

In 1934 the local athletic cell of the Dynamo sports society and NKVD organized construction of the city stadium by a method of subbotnik. It was headed by the NKVD officer Dmitry Medvedev who during the World War II became a notable Soviet partisan. The stadium was built in the city park that was recently opened in summer of 1933. The stadium began its operations in 1935 and was awarded to the sports club Silmash, former Metalist.

During the World War II the team was dissolved once again. The stadium was ruined almost entirely, at 84%.

The sports club was reestablished in 1945, but its football team was not revived until 1948 when by being a member of the former Volunteer Sports Society Selmash, it was reorganised as Traktor Kirovograd (Traktor Kirovohrad) and after 1953 – Torpedo. In 1953 Torpedo Kirovohrad won its first republican trophy, the Ukrainian SSR football cup. In the final Torpedo defeated Lokomotyv Poltava.

In first post-War years 1946–47 Kirovograd (Kirovohrad) was represented in football competitions by a law enforcement team "Dynamo".

In 1958, the club was renamed into Zvezda Kirovograd (Zirka Kirovohrad) when it advanced to the professional level of Soviet competitions, the B Class. On 22 November 1961 the sports club, which Zirka represented, followed the suit and adopted the name of its football team. In 1961 Zirka established its own sports school, DYuSSh. Also, that year the Zirka football team obtained another republican trophy, the Ruby Cup that was awarded to the team with the most goals scored. The next year, 1962, Kirovohrad was once again represented by the NKVD/KGB team of Dynamo in place of the factory team. In 1963 Zirka was reinstated.

In 1973 and 1975 Zirka obtained the Ukrainian SSR football cup among the "teams of masters". In the 1973 final Zirka defeated Spartak Ivano-Frankivsk, while in the 1975 final it was Tavriya Simferopol. Note that since 1957 the original Ukrainian Cup competitions were degraded and became a regional competition of the Soviet Amateur Cup, so for short period in 1970 there existed two parallel competitions. However, the competition among the teams of masters was discontinued.

On the initiative of the athletes who were war veterans on 8 May 1985 in Kirovohrad (today Kropyvnytskyi) at the Stadion Zirka was installed a memorial benchmark to the warrior-athletes who perished during the World War II.

In 1992, the Zirka football team reorganized into a separate organization as FC Zirka Kirovohrad. Also, the factory owned sports club Zirka liquidated its sports school.

From 1993 to 1997 the club carried a name of its title sponsor NIBAS as Zirka-NIBAS. Already in 1994 Zirka debuted at a top level for the 1994–95 season, where they finished 6th. In the 1999–2000 season they finished in last place and were relegated to the Ukrainian First League. They were promoted immediately as champions once again for the 2003–04 season but finished in last place and were demoted again. The football club Zirka existed until 2006 when it went bankrupt.

In 2007 the club was revived in amateur regional competitions. On 15 July 2008, the Professional Football League of Ukraine approved exchange names between Zirka and another club from Kirovohrad, FC Olimpik Kirovohrad, that competed at professional level to yield its place in the Ukrainian Second League.

In July 2016, the name of Zirka's hometown was renamed to Kropyvnytskyi. The next day the club announced it had changed its name to FC Zirka Kropyvnytskyi and its logo accordingly.

== Team names and crest ==
Emblem 2008–11

Emblem Zirka NIBAS

Emblem before 2008

| Year | Name | Meaning |
| 1922–27 | Chervona Zirka | Red Star |
| 1928–35 | Metalist | Steeler |
| 1935–40 | Silmash | portmanteau for Mechanised agriculture |
| 1941–45 | club was dissolved due to the World War II | |
| 1946–52 | Traktor | Tractor |
| 1953–57 | Torpedo | |
| 1958–present | Zirka | Star (in 1993-97 as Zirka NIBAS) |

=== Crest ===
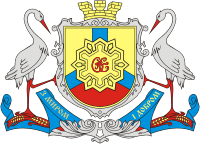
Great coat of arms of Kropyvnytskyi

Current club's crest (logo) was adopted in 2012. In 2016 as part of decommunisation process, the club changed its city's name and year of establishment claiming its heritage of the previously existing team of British factory "Elvorti".

In 2008-2011 the club's crest contained the Red Star (the club's former name and the name of factory which owned the club) and most of elements of coat of arms of the city of Kropyvnytskyi.

== Owners (sponsors) ==
- 1911–1993: Elvorti factory (Chervona Zirka), Kirovohrad
- 1993–1998: Agrarian company Nibas, Petropavlivka (Dnipropetrovsk Oblast)
- 1998–2011: City authorities, Kirovohrad
- 2011–present: Creative Industrial Group, Kropyvnytskyi

== Coaches and administration ==
| Administration | Coaching (senior team) | Coaching (youth teams) |
|---|---|---|
| President: Maksym Berezkin; Executive director: Andriy Perevoznyk | Head coach: Samir Hasanov | Coach (U-17): Dmytro Donchenko; Coach (U-16): Mykola Lapa; Coach (U-15): Vadym Darenko |

== Honors ==
- Football Cup of the Ukrainian SSR
  - Winner (1): 1953
- Football Cup of the Ukrainian SSR (teams of masters)
  - Winner (2): 1973, 1975
- Ukrainian First League
  - Winner (3): 1995, 2003, 2016
- Ukrainian Second League
  - Winner (1): 2009

=== Football kits and sponsors ===
| Years | Football kit | Shirt sponsor |
|---|---|---|
| 2003–2009 | lotto/nike | – |
| 2009–2013 | nike/joma | – |
| 2013–present | joma | – |

== League and cup history ==
Soviet competitions
The republican football competitions in Ukraine during the Soviet period is poorly documented, so there is little information available about the Zirka's competition record before 1958.

Ukrainian competitions

Tier 1
Tier 2
Tier 3
Tier 4
Amateurs

=== Soviet Union ===
| Season | Div. | Pos. | Pl. | W | D | L | GS | GA | P | Domestic Cup | Europe | Notes |
|---|---|---|---|---|---|---|---|---|---|---|---|---|
| 1971 | | 6 (26) | 50 | 21 | 17 | 12 | 52 | 33 | 59 | | | |
| 1972 | | 14 (24) | 46 | 13 | 18 | 15 | 40 | 51 | 44 | 1/16 final Cup of Ukrainian SSR | | |
| 1973 | | 12 (23) | 44 | 16 | 10 | 18 | 63 | 57 | 36 | Winner Cup of Ukrainian SSR | | |
| 1974 | | 17 (20) | 38 | 11 | 9 | 18 | 34 | 46 | 31 | 1/16 final Cup of Ukrainian SSR | | |
| 1975 | | 5 (17) | 32 | 13 | 10 | 9 | 37 | 22 | 36 | Winner Cup of Ukrainian SSR | | |
| 1976 | | 7 (20) | 38 | 18 | 6 | 14 | 42 | 34 | 42 | 1/4 final Cup of Ukrainian SSR | | |
| 1977 | | 5 (23) | 44 | 21 | 15 | 8 | 52 | 27 | 57 | | | |
| 1978 | | 7 (23) | 44 | 17 | 15 | 12 | 42 | 33 | 49 | | | |
| 1979 | | 9 (24) | 46 | 20 | 10 | 16 | 44 | 40 | 50 | | | |
| 1980 | | 6 (23) | 44 | 20 | 13 | 11 | 52 | 44 | 53 | | | |
| 1981 | | 17 (23) | 44 | 10 | 19 | 15 | 36 | 36 | 39 | | | |
| 1982 | | 15 (24) | 46 | 17 | 5 | 24 | 43 | 63 | 39 | | | |
| 1983 | 3rd (Vtoraya Liga) | 17 (26) | 50 | 15 | 14 | 21 | 48 | 56 | 44 | | | |
| 1984 | 3rd (Vtoraya Liga) | 8 (13) | 24 | 8 | 7 | 9 | 31 | 29 | 23 | | | |
| 1984 | 3rd (Vtoraya Liga) | 18 (26) | 14 | 5 | 4 | 5 | 23 | 20 | 14 | | | |
| 1985 | 3rd (Vtoraya Liga) | 2 (14) | 26 | 12 | 7 | 7 | 35 | 27 | 31 | | | |
| 1985 | 3rd (Vtoraya Liga) | 10 (28) | 14 | 5 | 1 | 8 | 21 | 33 | 11 | | | |
| 1986 | 3rd (Vtoraya Liga) | 10 (14) | 26 | 9 | 4 | 13 | 28 | 51 | 22 | | | |
| 1986 | 3rd (Vtoraya Liga) | 21 (28) | 14 | 7 | 1 | 6 | 20 | 28 | 15 | | | |
| 1987 | 3rd (Vtoraya Liga) | 23 (27) | 52 | 13 | 13 | 26 | 44 | 77 | 39 | | | |
| 1988 | 3rd (Vtoraya Liga) | 23 (26) | 50 | 13 | 15 | 22 | 39 | 60 | 41 | | | |
| 1989 | 3rd (Vtoraya Liga) | 14 (27) | 52 | 16 | 17 | 19 | 44 | 52 | 49 | | | |
| 1990 | 4th (Vtoraya Nizshaya Liga) | 19 (19) | 36 | 7 | 7 | 22 | 32 | 61 | 21 | 1/8 final Cup of Ukrainian SSR | | Relegated |
| 1991 | 4th (Vtoraya Nizshaya Liga) | 25 (26) | 50 | 12 | 13 | 25 | 55 | 90 | 37 | 1/4 final Cup of Ukrainian SSR | | admitted to Ukrainian Second League |

=== Ukraine (1992–2007) ===
| Season | Div. | Pos. | Pl. | W | D | L | GS | GA | P | Domestic Cup | Europe | Notes |
|---|---|---|---|---|---|---|---|---|---|---|---|---|
| 1992 | 3rd (Druha Liha) | 4 | 16 | 8 | 3 | 5 | 35 | 24 | 19 | Did not qualify | | |
| 1992–93 | 3rd (Druha Liha) | 4 | 34 | 16 | 9 | 9 | 50 | 33 | 41 | 1/32 finals | | |
| 1993–94 | 3rd (Druha Liha) | 3 | 42 | 25 | 7 | 10 | 60 | 41 | 57 | 1/32 finals | | Promoted |
| 1994–95 | 2nd (Persha Liha) | 1 | 42 | 27 | 10 | 5 | 68 | 26 | 91 | 1/32 finals | | Promoted |
| 1995–96 | 1st (Vyshcha Liha) | 6 | 34 | 14 | 8 | 12 | 37 | 33 | 50 | 1/16 finals | | |
| 1996–97 | 1st (Vyshcha Liha) | 10 | 30 | 11 | 3 | 16 | 31 | 55 | 36 | 1/8 finals | | |
| 1997–98 | 1st (Vyshcha Liha) | 11 | 30 | 9 | 6 | 15 | 27 | 48 | 33 | 1/16 finals | | |
| 1998–99 | 1st (Vyshcha Liha) | 11 | 30 | 9 | 7 | 14 | 31 | 40 | 34 | Semi finals | | |
| 1999-00 | 1st (Vyshcha Liha) | 16 | 30 | 0 | 9 | 21 | 16 | 66 | 9 | Semi finals | | Relegated |
| 2000–01 | 2nd (Persha Liha) | 15 | 34 | 10 | 10 | 14 | 27 | 34 | 40 | 1/16 finals | | |
| 2001–02 | 2nd (Persha Liha) | 9 | 34 | 11 | 13 | 10 | 29 | 28 | 46 | 4th round | | |
| 2002–03 | 2nd (Persha Liha) | 1 | 34 | 22 | 5 | 7 | 45 | 22 | 71 | 1/16 finals | | Promoted |
| 2003–04 | 1st (Vyshcha Liha) | 16 | 30 | 3 | 8 | 19 | 16 | 43 | 14 | 1/32 finals | | Bankrupt |
| 2004–05 | 3rd "B" (Druha Liha) | 12 | 26 | 7 | 6 | 13 | 29 | 38 | 27 | 1/32 finals | | |
| 2005–06 | 3rd "B" (Druha Liha) | 9 | 28 | 11 | 4 | 13 | 23 | 37 | 37 | 1/32 finals | | Bankrupt |
| 2007 | 4th (Amatory) | 2 | 8 | 4 | 1 | 3 | 12 | 12 | 13 | | | |

=== After 2008 ===
| Season | Div. | Pos. | Pl. | W | D | L | GS | GA | P | Domestic Cup | Europe | Notes |
|---|---|---|---|---|---|---|---|---|---|---|---|---|
| 2007–08 | 3rd "B" (Druha Liha) | as FC Olimpik Kirovohrad | | | | | | | | | | |
| 2008–09 | 3rd "B" (Druha Liha) | 1 | 34 | 23 | 3 | 8 | 56 | 26 | 72 | 1/16 finals | | Promoted |
| 2009–10 | 2nd (Persha Liha) | 12 | 34 | 11 | 13 | 10 | 38 | 40 | 43 | 1/32 finals | | –3 |
| 2010–11 | 2nd (Persha Liha) | 12 | 34 | 12 | 7 | 15 | 43 | 44 | 43 | 1/32 finals | | |
| 2011–12 | 2nd (Persha Liha) | 11 | 34 | 13 | 5 | 16 | 53 | 49 | 44 | 1/16 finals | | |
| 2012–13 | 2nd (Persha Liha) | 8 | 34 | 14 | 10 | 10 | 46 | 37 | 52 | 1/32 finals | | |
| 2013–14 | 2nd (Persha Liha) | 6 | 30 | 12 | 8 | 10 | 36 | 34 | 44 | 1/16 finals | | |
| 2014–15 | 2nd (Persha Liha) | 4 | 30 | 14 | 7 | 9 | 42 | 27 | 49 | 1/16 finals | | |
| 2015–16 | 2nd (Persha Liha) | 1 | 30 | 20 | 5 | 5 | 49 | 22 | 65 | 1/8 finals | | Promoted |
| 2016–17 | 1st (Premier League) | 9 | 32 | 9 | 7 | 16 | 29 | 43 | 34 | 1/16 finals | | |
| 2017–18 | 1st (Premier League) | 10 | 32 | 7 | 10 | 15 | 22 | 40 | 31 | 1/16 finals | | Relegated |
| 2018–19 | 2nd | 15 | 17 | 1 | 1 | 15 | 10 | 49 | 4 | 1/16 finals | | Withdrawn |
| 2019–20 | 4th (Amateur) | 6 | 18 | 9 | 3 | 6 | 30 | 19 | 30 | Did not enter | | |
| 2020–21 | 4th (Amateur) | 12 | 22 | 0 | 0 | 22 | 9 | 86 | 0 | Did not enter | | |
| 2021–22 | 4th (Amateur) | 5 | 8 | 2 | 4 | 2 | 11 | 13 | 10 | Did not qualify | | interrupted due to war |
| 2022–23 | 4th (Amateur) | 8 | 14 | 2 | 2 | 10 | 15 | 36 | 8 | Did not qualify | | |
| 2023–24 | 4th (Amateur) | 6 | 16 | 7 | 1 | 8 | 25 | 34 | 22 | Did not qualify | | |
