= Molod Ukrayiny =

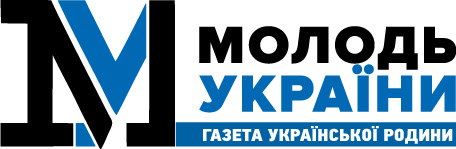
- Type: Monthly
- Format: Broadsheet
- Owner(s): Komsomol of Ukraine (1925–1991); State Management of Affairs (1991-2011); Molod Ukrayiny Publishing House (2011-present)
- Publisher: Pressa Ukrayiny (1925–2011) "Molod Ukrayiny" Publishing House (2011–present)
- Editor-in-chief: Serhiy Bondarenko
- Founded: 1925
- Language: Ukrainian
- Headquarters: Kharkiv (1925–1934); Kyiv (1934–present)
- Sister newspapers: Komsomolskaya Pravda (until 1991); Ukrayina Moloda (until 1991); Ukrainskiy Football (1991–present)

Molod Ukrayiny (Ukrainian: Молодь України) is a Ukrainian newspaper published daily in Kyiv. It is a Ukrainian language newspaper and the Ukrainian analogue of Komsomolskaya Pravda. Until 1934 it was located in Kharkiv. Since the fall of the Soviet Union the newspapers are privately owned.

== History ==
In 1921, the newspaper "News of the Central Committee of the Communist Youth Union of Ukraine" was published in Kharkiv. In 1922, it was renamed the Molodoi Rabotnik, which was published twice a week in Russian.

In January 1924 (January 6–27), the newspaper was renamed Molodoi Leninets. The newspaper was published 3 times a week, the publisher was the Central and Kharkiv Committee of the LKSMU. In 1925, a literary edition appeared.

In 1925–1943, it was known as Komsomolets Ukrayiny. 155 issues were published in Kharkiv till 1934. Since 1925 it was published by the state publisher Radyanska Ukrayina (Pressa Ukrayiny since 1991).

In 1934, Kyiv became the capital of Ukraine and Komsomolets Ukrainy moved to Kyiv.

In 2011, Molod Ukrayiny refused services of its original publisher and began to be published independently.

In 1969–1990, it was awarded annually the Ukrainian Footballer of the Year to players who played for the Ukrainian clubs in the Soviet football competitions. Also it was awarded annually the Ruby Cup for the best scoring team in the Football Championship of the Ukrainian SSR.

The newspaper was awarded three orders: the Order of the Patriotic War, the Order of Friendship of Peoples and the Order of the Red Banner of Labour.

== Authors ==
Over the years of its existence, many publicists, writers and poets were involved into the work of Molod Ukrayiny: Vasyl Symonenko, Maksym Rylsky, Andriy Malyshko, Mykola Vinhranovsky, Borys Oliynyk, Vitaliy Korotych, Ivan Drach, Ivan Dziuba, Yevhen Sverstiuk, Vasyl Stus, Stanislav Telnyuk, Ivan Svitlychny, Serhiy Grabovsky, Anatoliy Matviychuk, Viktor Maza.

== See also ==
- Ukrayina Moloda
