= Valeriy Petrov =

Ukrainian footballer (1955–2022)

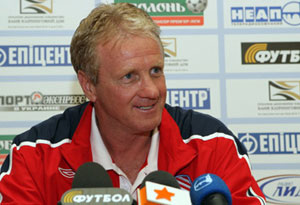

Personal information
- Full name: Valeriy Pavlovych Petrov
- Date of birth: 2 March 1955
- Place of birth: Sevastopol, Ukrainian SSR, Soviet Union
- Date of death: 8 March 2022 (aged 67)
- Place of death: Simferopol, Crimea
- Position: Striker

Senior career*
Years	Team	Apps	(Gls)
1973–1980	FC Atlantyka Sevastopol	105	(44)
1980–1984	Tavriya Simferopol	135	(35)

Managerial career
- 1986–1988: FC Ocean Kerch (assistant)
- 1992: Nyva Vinnytsia
- 1995–1996: Chaika Sevastopol
- 1997–1999: Tavriya Simferopol (assistant)
- 1999: Tavriya Simferopol (caretaker)
- 1999: Chornomorets Sevastopol
- 2000: Tavriya Simferopol (assistant)
- 2001: Krystal Kherson
- 2001–2002: Tavriya Simferopol (caretaker)
- 2002–2005: Sevastopol
- 2005–2006: FC Tytan Armyansk
- 2006–2008: Tavriya Simferopol (youth team)
- 2008–2014: Tavriya Simferopol (sportive director)
- 2010–2011: Tavriya Simferopol (caretaker)
- 2011–2012: Tavriya Simferopol (youth team)
- * Club domestic league appearances and goals

Valeriy Pavlovych Petrov (Ukrainian: Валерій Павлович Петров; 2 March 1955 – 8 March 2022) was a Soviet football player and Ukrainian coach.

== Biography ==
He played as a striker for SC Tavriya Simferopol.

Petrov died from complications of COVID-19 on 8 March 2022, at the age of 67.
