= Mykola Pinchuk =

Ukrainian and Soviet footballer (1946–2026)

Personal information
- Full name: Mykola Ivanovych Pinchuk
- Date of birth: 25 July 1946
- Place of birth: Tikhoretsk, Krasnodar Krai, Russian SFSR, USSR
- Date of death: 30 March 2026 (aged 79)
- Position: Defender

Senior career*
Years	Team	Apps	(Gls)
1965–1966	Torpedo Armavir	40	(4)
1967	Kuzbass Kemerovo	33	(1)
1968–1978	Zarya Voroshilovgrad	247	(4)

International career
1972	USSR	1	(0)
- * Club domestic league appearances and goals

Mykola Ivanovych Pinchuk (Ukrainian: Микола Іванович Пінчук, Russian: Николай Иванович Пинчук, romanized: Nikolai Ivanovich Pinchuk; 25 July 1946 – 30 March 2026) was a Ukrainian and Soviet footballer who played as a defender. He played his only game for USSR on 29 June 1972 in a friendly against Uruguay. He died in 30 March 2026, at the age of 79.

== Honours ==
Zorya Luhansk

- Soviet Top League: 1972

== Sources ==
- (in Russian) Profile
- Mykola Pinchuk at FootballFacts.ru (in Russian)
