= List of FC Vorskla Poltava seasons =

== Soviet Union ==
Note: In Soviet competitions league calendar mostly stretched from spring through fall, while main rounds of the cup tournament sometimes would follow the fall-spring format.

Season	Div.	Pos.	Pl.	W	D	L	GS	GA	P	Soviet Cup	Other	Notes
Kolgospnik / Kolhospnyk
1955	4th (Chempionat URSR z futbolu)	3	14	8	2	4	25	13	18	Ukrainian Cup		qualified for final group
1955	4th (Chempionat URSR z futbolu)	8	7	0	2	5	15	24	2	Ukrainian Cup		
1956	4th (Chempionat URSR z futbolu)	2	14	8	4	2	23	11	20	Ukrainian Cup		Admitted
1957	2nd (Klass B, Zona 2)	12	34	12	4	18	43	57	28	Zone qualifications		
1958	2nd (Klass B, Zona 2)	7	30	12	10	8	32	27	34	Zone qualifications		
1959	2nd (Klass B, Zona 2)	14	28	6	6	16	23	46	18	Zone qualifications		
1960	2nd (Klass B (Ukraine), Zona 2)	13	36	10	9	17	45	51	29	Zone qualifications		(Note: Relegation play-off won over Lokomotyv Poltava 5:3, 1:3, 2:1)
1961	2nd (Klass B (Ukraine), Zona 2)	9	36	12	12	12	40	39	36	Zone qualifications		(qualified for the 17th place play-off)
1961	2nd (Klass B (Ukraine), Zona 2)	1	2	1	0	1	3	3	2	Zone qualifications		17th (play-off won over Avanhard Chernivtsi) (Note: Relegation play-off won over Lokomotyv Poltava 2:0, 5:2)
1962	2nd (Klass B (Ukraine), Zona 1)	12	24	4	10	10	27	37	18	Zone qualifications		(qualified for the 29-39 places group)
1962	2nd (Klass B (Ukraine), Zona 1)	6	10	3	4	3	14	11	10	Zone qualifications		34th, Relegated
1963	3rd (Klass B (Ukraine), Zona 2)	9	38	15	10	13	40	32	40	Zone qualifications		(qualified for the 17th place play-off)
1963	3rd (Klass B (Ukraine), Zona 2)	2	2	1	0	1	2	5	2	Zone qualifications		18th (play-off lost to Dynamo Khmelnytskyi)
1964	3rd (Klass B (Ukraine), Zona 2)	4	30	13	11	6	35	21	37	Zone qualifications		(qualified for the 7-12 places group)
1964	3rd (Klass B (Ukraine), Zona 2)	1	10	7	1	2	13	10	15	Zone qualifications		7th in 7-12 group
Kolos
1965	3rd (Klass B (Ukraine), Zona 1)	3	30	11	14	5	32	19	36	Zone qualifications		(qualified for the 7-12 places group)
1965	3rd (Klass B (Ukraine), Zona 1)	6	10	2	2	6	7	13	6	Zone qualifications		12th in 7-12 group
1966	3rd (Klass B (Ukraine), Zona 1)	5	38	14	14	10	50	32	42	–		(qualified for the 9th place play-off)
1966	3rd (Klass B (Ukraine), Zona 1)	2	2	0	0	2	1	5	0	–		10th (play-off lost to Spartak Ivano-Frankivsk)
1967	3rd (Klass B (Ukraine), Zona 2)	10	40	13	14	13	37	38	40	Zone qualifications		Promoted
Selstroy / Silbud
1968	2nd (Klass A (Vtoraya Gruppa), Pervaya podgruppa)	5	40	18	13	9	50	34	49	Round of 128		
Stroitel / Budivelnyk
1969	2nd (Klass A (Vtoraya Gruppa), Tretiya podgruppa)	10	42	14	15	13	34	33	43	Round of 256		Relegated
1970	3rd (Klass A (Vtoraya Gruppa), Zona 1)	13	42	13	13	16	33	34	39	Round of 256		
1971	3rd (Vtoraya Liga, Zona 1)	8	50	21	13	16	54	43	55	–		
1972	3rd (Vtoraya Liga, Zona 1)	11	46	17	17	12	44	45	51	Ukrainian Cup		
Kolos
1973	3rd (Vtoraya Liga, Zona 1)	18	44	12	7/1	24	44	68	31	Ukrainian Cup		
1974	3rd (Vtoraya Liga, Zona 6)	15	38	9	17	12	25	29	35	Ukrainian Cup		
1975	3rd (Vtoraya Liga, Zona 6)	9	32	11	10	11	44	41	32	Ukrainian Cup		
1976	3rd (Vtoraya Liga, Zona 6)	16	38	12	9	17	38	44	33	Ukrainian Cup		
1977	3rd (Vtoraya Liga, Zona 2)	21	44	10	8	26	36	64	28	–		
1978	3rd (Vtoraya Liga, Zona 2)	16	44	14	9	21	40	53	37	–		
1979	3rd (Vtoraya Liga, Zona 2)	11	46	18	9	19	48	52	45	–		
1980	3rd (Vtoraya Liga, Zona 5)	21	44	9	13	22	37	61	31	–		
1981	3rd (Vtoraya Liga, Zona 5)	19	44	11	16	17	33	61	38	–		
1982	3rd (Vtoraya Liga, Zona 6)	24	46	10	14	22	21	44	34	–		Relegated; dissolved
club idle in 1983
club reorganized based on the Kolos academy
Vorskla
1984	4th (KFK (Ukraine))	1	16	11	3	2	33	13	25			qualified for final group
1984	4th (KFK (Ukraine))	4	5	1	1	3	4	8	3			
1985	4th (KFK (Ukraine))	1	14	11	2	1	37	10	24			qualified for final group
1985	4th (KFK (Ukraine))	3	5	3	1	1	8	3	7			
1986	4th (KFK (Ukraine))	1	16	13	1	2	45	13	27			qualified for final group
1986	4th (KFK (Ukraine))	1	5	4	1	0	11	1	9			Promoted
1987	3rd (Vtoraya Liga)	9	52	22	14	16	74	59	58			Ukrainian Championship
1988	3rd (Vtoraya Liga)	2	50	30	8	12	70	42	68			Ukrainian Championship
1989	3rd (Vtoraya Liga)	8	52	24	10	18	62	55	58			Ukrainian Championship
1990	3rd (Vtoraya Liga)	12	42	15	11	16	47	51	41	1/16 finals		Zone West
1991	3rd (Vtoraya Liga)	19	42	10	11	21	39	60	31	1/32 finals		Zone West
1992	no competition									1/64 finals		

== Ukraine ==
Season	Div.	Pos.	Pl.	W	D	L	GS	GA	P	Domestic Cup	Europe		Notes
1992	2nd (Persha Liha)	8	26	12	5	9	33	25	29	1/16 finals			Group B
1992–93	2nd (Persha Liha)	4	42	21	9	12	57	46	51	1/32 finals			
1993–94	2nd (Persha Liha)	8	38	15	7	16	30	52	37	1/16 finals			
1994–95	2nd (Persha Liha)	11	42	17	8	17	49	48	59	1/8 finals			
1995–96	2nd (Persha Liha)	1	42	32	7	3	92	37	103	1/32 finals			Promoted
1996–97	1st (Vyshcha Liha)	3	30	17	7	6	50	26	58	1/4 finals			
1997–98	1st (Vyshcha Liha)	5	30	15	4	11	41	46	49	1/4 finals	UC	2nd qual round	
1998–99	1st (Vyshcha Liha)	10	30	10	5	15	36	43	35	1/4 finals			
1999–00	1st (Vyshcha Liha)	4	30	14	7	9	50	34	49	1/8 finals			
2000–01	1st (Vyshcha Liha)	12	26	6	5	15	16	29	23	1/16 finals	UC	1st round	
2001–02	1st (Vyshcha Liha)	11	26	6	7	13	19	33	25	1/16 finals			
2002–03	1st (Vyshcha Liha)	11	30	8	8	14	26	41	32	1/4 finals			
2003–04	1st (Vyshcha Liha)	14	30	6	9	15	26	49	27	1/8 finals			
2004–05	1st (Vyshcha Liha)	14	30	8	6	16	18	35	30	1/16 finals			
2005–06	1st (Vyshcha Liha)	10	30	9	10	11	28	34	37	1/4 finals	-	-	-
2006–07	1st (Vyshcha Liha)	13	30	7	10	13	23	28	31	1/16 finals	-	-	-
2007–08	1st (Vyshcha Liha)	8	30	9	9	12	28	30	36	1/4 finals	-	-	-
2008–09	1st (Premier Liha)	5	30	14	7	9	32	26	49	Winners	-	-	-
2009–10	1st (Premier Liha)	10	30	6	13	11	29	32	31	1/16 finals	EL	Play-off Round	-
2010–11	1st (Premier Liha)	6	30	10	9	11	37	32	39	1/8 finals	-	-	-
2011–12	1st (Premier Liha)	8	30	9	10	11	38	43	37	1/8 finals	EL	Group stage	-
2012–13	1st (Premier Liha)	12	30	8	7	15	31	36	31	1/8 finals	-	-	-
2013–14	1st (Premier Liha)	8	28	10	10	8	36	38	40	1/8 finals	-	-	-
2014–15	1st (Premier Liha)	5	26	11	9	6	35	22	42	1/8 finals	-	-	-
2015–16	1st (Premier Liha)	5	26	11	9	6	32	26	42	1/4 finals	EL	3rd qual. round	-
2016–17	1st (Premier Liha)	7	32	11	9	12	32	32	42	1/4 finals	EL	3rd qual. round	-
2017–18	1st (Premier Liha)	3	32	14	7	11	37	35	49	1/4 finals	-	-	-
2018–19	1st (Premier Liha)	7	32	12	6	14	31	43	42	1/4 finals	EL	Group stage	-
2019–20	1st (Premier Liha)	10	32	9	7	16	23	48	34	Runners-up	-	-	-
2020–21	1st (Premier Liha)	5	30	11	8	7	37	30	41	1/8 finals	-	-	-
2021–22	1st (Premier Liha)	5	18	9	6	3	30	18	33	1/4 finals*	ECL	2nd qual. round	-
2022–23	1st (Premier Liha)	5	30	13	6	11	38	37	45	—	ECL	2nd qual. round	-
2023–24	1st (Premier Liha)	9	30	9	6	15	30	46	33	Runners-up	ECL	2nd qual. round	-
2024–25	1st (Premier Liha)	13	30	6	9	15	24	38	27	Round of 16	-	-	Relegated to FL via play-off Kudrivka 2:1 0:1 (3-4p)
2025–26	2nd (Persha Liha)	14	30	7	9	14	23	36	30	Round of 64 (1/32)	-	-	Relegation play-off: Polissya-2 Zhytomyr
