= List of FC Chornomorets Odesa seasons =

== Soviet Union ==
Note: In Soviet competitions league calendar mostly stretched from spring through fall, while main rounds of the cup tournament sometimes would follow the fall-spring format.

Season	Div.	Pos.	Pl.	W	D	L	GS	GA	P	Soviet Cup	Other		Notes
Pishchevik / Kharchovyk
1938	4th (Chempionat URSR z futbolu)	5	11	4	4	3	16	16	23	–	CU	1/8 finals	
1939	4th (Chempionat URSR z futbolu)	2	9	6	1	2			22	–	CU	1/8 finals	Promoted (Note: Pishchevik merged with FC Dynamo Odesa and replaced it in "Gruppa B" next season.)
1940	2nd (Gruppa B)	5	26	12	4	10	49	40	28	–			Promoted
Spartak
1941	1st (Gruppa A)	10	10	3	2	5	16	22	8	–			
1942	During World War II the club was dissolved												
1943	During World War II the club was dissolved												
Pishchevik / Kharchovyk
1944	no league competition												
1945	2nd (Vtoraya Gruppa)	7	17	9	1	7	26	22	19	1/16 finals	CU	1/2 finals	
1946	2nd (Vtoraya Gruppa. Yuzhnaya podruppa)	4	24	12	6	6	43	27	30	–	CU	1/4 finals	
1947	2nd (Vtoraya Gruppa. Zona USSR)	3	24	14	5	5	45	21	33	1/128 finals	CU	Final	
1948	2nd (Vtoraya Gruppa. Zona USSR)	5	14	5	5	4	19	18	15	–	CU	1/4 finals	
1949	2nd (Vtoraya Gruppa. Zona USSR)	1	34	23	4	7	81	36	50	1/64 finals			
1949	2nd (Vtoraya Gruppa. Zona USSR)	3	8	2	3	3	8	7	7	1/64 finals			
1950	2nd (Class B)	8	26	8	10	8	33	32	26	1/32 finals			Relegation play-off (Note: lost play-off against FC Spartak Uzhhorod 1:1, 0:1)
Metallurg / Metalurh
1951	4th (Chempionat URSR z futbolu)	5	18	8	5	5	33	17	21	–	CU	1/2 finals	
1952	4th (Chempionat URSR z futbolu)	8	22	5	6	11	32	37	16	–	–	–	Promoted
1953	2nd (Class B)	3	17	6	8	3	20	12	20	1/16 finals			
1953	2nd (Class B)	7	2	2	0	0	5	1	4	1/16 finals			won its group (7–9)
1954	2nd (Class B)	6	22	8	4	10	37	42	20	1/32 finals			
Pishchevik / Kharchovyk
1955	2nd (Class B)	12	30	11	5	14	39	47	27	1/32 finals			
1956	2nd (Class B)	15	34	8	10	16	40	57	26	–			Relegation play-off (Note: won play-off against FC Shakhtar Kadiyivka 2:1, 1:1)
1957	2nd (Class B)	5	34	16	7	11	65	48	39	1/32 finals			
Chernomorets / Chornomorets
1958	2nd (Class B)	12	30	9	8	13	33	42	26	1/128 finals			
1959	2nd (Class B)	4	28	15	4	9	40	25	34	–			
1960	2nd (Class B)	4	32	19	4	9	63	31	42	1/64 finals			
1961	2nd (Class B)	1	34	26	5	3	66	23	57	1/32 finals			won play-off vs SKA Odesa
1962	2nd (Class B)	1	24	13	8	3	48	20	34	1/16 finals			advanced to final
1962	2nd (Class B)	2	10	4	3	3	13	9	11	1/16 finals			
1963	2nd (Class A. Vtoraya gruppa)	6	34	13	13	8	39	31	39	1/32 finals			
1964	2nd (Class A. Vtoraya gruppa)	2	24	11	7	6	27	21	29	1/16 finals			advanced to final
1964	2nd (Class A. Vtoraya gruppa)	4	14	8	3	3	25	14	19	1/16 finals			Promoted
1965	1st (Class A. Pervaya Gruppa)	14	32	9	8	15	35	43	26	1/16 finals			
1966	1st (Class A. Pervaya Gruppa)	14	36	10	13	13	29	36	33	1/2 finals			
1967	1st (Class A. Pervaya Gruppa)	18	36	8	11	17	25	46	27	1/4 finals			
1968	1st (Class A. Pervaya Gruppa)	8	38	11	16	11	47	49	38	1/16 finals			
1969	1st (Class A. Pervaya Gruppa)	7	18	5	7	6	14	17	17	1/8 finals			
1969	1st (Class A. Pervaya Gruppa)	8	14	5	3	6	11	13	13	1/8 finals			Places 1-14 group
1970	1st (Class A. Vysshaya Gruppa)	15	32	8	10	14	25	38	26	1/4 finals			Relegated
1971	2nd (Pervaya Liga)	3	42	21	11	10	56	33	53	1/16 finals			
1972	2nd (Pervaya Liga)	3	38	20	8	10	67	36	48	1/8 finals	CU	1/2 finals	
1973	2nd (Pervaya Liga)	1	38	24	6	8	83	38	52	1/4 finals	CU	1/4 finals	Promoted
1974	1st (Vysshaya Liga)	3	30	12	11	7	35	31	35	1/8 finals			
1975	1st (Vysshaya Liga)	12	30	8	10	12	27	35	26	1/16 finals	UC	1st round	
1976	1st (Vysshaya Liga)	10	15	4	7	4	14	18	15	1/8 finals			spring half
1976	1st (Vysshaya Liga)	9	15	7	1	7	14	20	15	1/8 finals			fall half
1977	1st (Vysshaya Liga)	7	30	11	8	11	33	41	30	1/16 finals			
1978	1st (Vysshaya Liga)	7	30	12	10	8	41	26	32 (−2)	1/8 finals			Drawn games over limit
1979	1st (Vysshaya Liga)	11	34	10	11	13	32	37	28 (−3)	Group stage			Drawn games over limit
1980	1st (Vysshaya Liga)	7	34	13	9	12	37	37	35	Group stage			
1981	1st (Vysshaya Liga)	11	34	11	9	14	36	44	31	1/4 finals			
1982	1st (Vysshaya Liga)	10	34	11	11	12	30	36	32 (−1)	Group stage			Drawn games over limit
1983	1st (Vysshaya Liga)	8	34	16	5	13	44	46	37	1/8 finals			
1984	1st (Vysshaya Liga)	4	34	16	9	9	49	38	41	1/4 finals			Cup tournament switched format
1985	1st (Vysshaya Liga)	15	34	11	7	16	44	65	29	1/8 finals	UC	2nd round	Relegation tournament
1986	1st (Vysshaya Liga)	15	30	8	7	15	29	37	23	1/4 finals			Relegated
1987	2nd (Pervaya Liga)	1	42	25	12	5	68	31	62	1/16 finals			Promoted
1988	1st (Vysshaya Liga)	13	30	9	6	15	24	37	24	1/64 finals			
1989	1st (Vysshaya Liga)	6	30	11	9	10	40	41	31	1/16 finals			
1990	1st (Vysshaya Liga)	9	24	8	3	13	23	29	19	1/8 finals	UC	2nd round	
1991	1st (Vysshaya Liga)	4	30	10	16	4	39	24	36	1/4 finals			
1992	No competition									1/4 finals^{Cup}			

Notes:Scheduled to play against PFC CSKA Moscow, Chornomorets withdrew from the Soviet Cup in 1992.

== Ukraine ==
Season	Div.	Pos.	Pl.	W	D	L	GS	GA	P	Domestic Cup	Europe		Notes
1992	1st (Top League)	5	18	9	7	2	30	12	35	Winner	-	-	-
1992–93	1st (Top League)	3	30	17	4	9	31	12	38	1/16 finals	CWC	1st round	-
1993–94	1st (Top League)	3	34	20	8	6	52	23	48	Winner	-	-	-
1994–95	1st (Top League)	2	34	22	7	5	62	29	73	1/2 finals	CWC	1st round	-
1995–96	1st (Top League)	2	34	22	7	5	56	25	73	1/16 finals	UC	2nd round	-
1996–97	1st (Top League)	7	30	12	6	12	36	31	42	1/4 finals	UC	1st round	-
1997–98	1st (Top League)	15	30	8	8	14	31	39	32	1/4 finals	-	-	Relegated
1998–99	2nd (First League)	2	38	25	4	9	77	38	79	1/64 finals	-	-	Promoted
1999–00	1st (Top League)	15	30	6	8	16	20	50	26	1/16 finals	-	-	Relegated
2000–01	2nd (First League)	6	34	17	6	11	44	28	57	1/8 finals	-	-	-
2001–02	2nd (First League)	2	34	21	4	9	48	21	67	1/16 finals	-	-	Promoted
2002–03	1st (Top League)	8	30	10	4	16	31	45	34	1/16 finals	-	-	-
2003–04	1st (Top League)	5	30	11	12	7	38	33	45	1/2 finals	-	-	-
2004–05	1st (Top League)	6	30	12	6	12	29	29	42	1/16 finals	-	-	-
2005–06	1st (Top League)	3	30	13	6	11	36	31	45	1/16 finals	-	-	-
2006–07	1st (Top League)	6	30	11	8	11	36	33	41	1/16 finals	UC	1st round	-
2007–08	1st (Top League)	7	30	11	5	14	27	33	38	1/2 finals	IC	3rd round	-
2008–09	1st (Premier League)	10	30	12	2	16	34	42	32	1/16 finals	-	-	(−6) disciplinary^{CAS}
2009–10	1st (Premier League)	15	30	5	9	16	21	44	24	1/16 finals	-	-	Relegated
2010–11	2nd (First League)	2	34	18	11	5	53	26	65	1/16 finals	-	-	Promoted
2011–12	1st (Premier League)	9	30	10	7	13	32	42	37	1/4 finals	-	-	-
2012–13	1st (Premier League)	6	30	12	7	11	32	36	43	Runners up	-	-	-
2013–14	1st (Premier League)	5	28	12	10	6	30	22	46	1/2 finals	EL	1/32 finals	-
2014–15	1st (Premier League)	11	25	3	11	11	15	31	20	1/8 finals	EL	3rd qual round	
2015–16	1st (Premier League)	11	26	4	10	12	20	39	22	1/8 finals	-	-	-
2016–17	1st (Premier League)	6	32	10	8	14	25	37	38	1/16 finals	-	-	-
2017–18	1st (Premier League)	11	32	6	11	15	26	49	29	1/8 finals	-	-	Relegation play-off
2018–19	1st (Premier League)	11	32	8	7	17	31	49	31	1/8 finals	-	-	Relegation play-off
2019–20	2nd (First League)	10	30	10	9	11	40	37	39	1/16 finals	-	-	-
2020–21	2nd (First League)	2	30	18	7	5	45	23	61	1/32 finals	-	-	Promoted
2021–22	1st (Premier League)	13	18	3	5	10	20	40	14	1/8 finals	-	-	began on 24.02.2022 Russian invasion of Ukraine
2022–23	1st (Premier League)	10	30	9	8	13	35	40	35	cancelled	-	-	-
2023–24	1st (Premier League)	12	30	10	2	18	38	47	32	1/2 finals	-	-	-
2024–25	1st (Premier League)	16	30	6	5	19	20	45	23	1/16 finals	-	-	Relegated to Ukrainian First League
2025–26	2nd (First League)	2	30	19	8	3	44	20	65	1/16 finals	-	-	Promoted to Ukrainian Premier League
2026–27	1st (Premier League)	TBD	TBD	TBD	TBD	TBD	TBD	TBD	0	1/32 finals	-	-	TBD

Notes: on decision of Court of Arbitration for Sport about Đorđe Inđić
