= 1962 Ukrainian Class B =

Football Championship of Ukrainian SSR
- Season: 1962
- Champions: FC Trudovi Rezervy Luhansk
- Promoted: FC Trudovi Rezervy Luhansk; FC Chornomorets Odesa; FC Metalurh Zaporizhia; FC Dnipro Dnipropetrovsk
- Relegated: none

The 1962 Football Championship of Ukrainian SSR (Class B) was the 32nd season of association football competition of the Ukrainian SSR, which was part of the Ukrainian Class B. It was the thirteenth in the Soviet Class B.

The 1962 Football Championship of Ukrainian SSR (Class B) was won by FC Trudovi Rezervy Luhansk.

There was reorganization of professional football competitions with Class A being expanded by adding extra tier and all Class B competitions including in Ukraine were moved to the third tier. This season due to reorganization 35 out of 39 teams were relegated to lower tier by continuing next season to compete in the Ukrainian Class B competitions.

== Format ==
Some 150 teams took part in competitions of the Soviet football championship in Class B. Collectives of the second echelon were distributed among 10 zones (groups) and represented all Union republics in the championship. The most teams in competitions represent the Russian Federation. They were competing not in six zones as in 1961, but in five.

The total number of teams was not diminished, and number of games in each zone increased. Also, same as in Russia, independent championship (with three zones) was conducted in Ukraine. In the rest two zones were competing teams of other Union republics. Competitions in Class B identified champion of Russian SFSR, Ukrainian SSR, and the best team of Union republics zone. All of them received a right to compete next season in the 1963 Class A.

The winning teams of championship of bigger cities, oblasts, krais, and republics were granted permission to play-off with teams of Class B of own republic and in case of win were to be promoted to Class B and the Class B teams that lost play-off were relegated out of teams of masters competitions.

The Class B teams that placed 1 through 3 in zones were freed from relegation play-offs.

== Location map ==
Locations of teams in Class B

== Zone 1 ==
=== Relegated teams ===
- none

=== Promoted teams ===
- FC Trubnyk Nikopol – (debut, champion of Dnipropetrovsk Oblast in 1961)

=== Relocated and renamed teams ===
- FC Lokomotyv Donetsk was last year known as FC Lokomotyv Stalino

=== League's standing ===
Pos	Team	Pld	W	D	L	GF	GA	GD	Pts
1	FC Chornomorets Odesa	24	13	8	3	48	20	+28	34
2	FC Polissya Zhytomyr	24	14	3	7	33	24	+9	31
3	FC Lokomotyv Donetsk	24	9	10	5	43	37	+6	28
4	SKA Lviv	24	10	6	8	37	25	+12	26
5	FC Avanhard Zhovti Vody	24	7	12	5	25	21	+4	26
6	FC Shakhtar Kadiivka	24	9	8	7	28	28	0	26
7	FC Arsenal Kyiv	24	5	13	6	18	19	−1	23
8	FC Torpedo Kharkiv	24	7	9	8	30	32	−2	23
9	FC Trubnyk Nikopol	24	8	5	11	33	34	−1	21
10	FC Sudnobudivnyk Mykolaiv	24	7	6	11	26	40	−14	20
11	FC Verkhovyna Uzhhorod	24	4	10	10	20	27	−7	18
12	FC Kolhospnyk Poltava	24	4	10	10	27	37	−10	18
13	FC Spartak Stanislav	24	5	8	11	21	45	−24	18

== Zone 2 ==
=== Relegated teams ===
- none

=== Promoted teams ===
- none

=== Relocated and renamed teams ===
- FC Dniprovets Dniprodzerzhynsk was last year known as FC Khimik Dniprodzerzhynsk
- FC Dynamo Kirovohrad was last year known as FC Zirka Kirovohrad
- FC Hirnyk Kryvyi Rih was last year known as FC Avanhard Kryvyi Rih

=== League's standing ===
Pos	Team	Pld	W	D	L	GF	GA	GD	Pts
1	SKA Odessa	24	12	10	2	46	21	+25	34
2	FC Metalurh Zaporizhia	24	13	5	6	42	21	+21	31
3	SKA Kiev	24	10	10	4	39	21	+18	30
4	FC Kolhospnyk Rivno	24	10	9	5	44	34	+10	29
5	FC Dniprovets Dniprodzerzhynsk	24	9	10	5	36	30	+6	28
6	FC Kolhospnyk Cherkasy	24	8	12	4	27	21	+6	28
7	FC Dynamo Kirovohrad	24	11	5	8	32	27	+5	27
8	FC Mayak Kherson	24	7	6	11	32	41	−9	20
9	FC Khimik Severodonetsk	24	7	6	11	25	36	−11	20
10	FC Avanhard Chernivtsi	24	6	6	12	27	45	−18	18
11	FC Hirnyk Kryvyi Rih	24	6	5	13	23	44	−21	17
12	FC Shakhtar Horlivka	24	3	9	12	22	36	−14	15
13	FC Volyn Lutsk	24	5	5	14	22	40	−18	15

== Zone 3 ==
=== Relegated teams ===
- none

=== Promoted teams ===
- FC Shakhtar Oleksandriya – (debut)

=== Relocated and renamed teams ===
- FC Dnipro Dnipropetrovsk was last year known as FC Metalurh Dnipropetrovsk

=== League's standing ===
Pos	Team	Pld	W	D	L	GF	GA	GD	Pts
1	FC Trudovi rezervy Luhansk	24	14	5	5	52	22	+30	33
2	FC Avanhard Simferopol	24	12	7	5	34	17	+17	31
3	FC Lokomotyv Vinnytsia	24	13	4	7	40	25	+15	30
4	FC Desna Chernihiv	24	10	8	6	40	33	+7	28
5	FC Azovstal Zhdanov	24	11	5	8	39	40	−1	27
6	FC Dnipro Dnipropetrovsk	24	7	12	5	35	29	+6	26
7	FC Avanhard Ternopil	24	7	11	6	30	31	−1	25
8	SKF Sevastopol	24	7	9	8	29	27	+2	23
9	FC Dynamo Khmelnytskyi	24	6	10	8	31	36	−5	22
10	FC Naftovyk Drohobych	24	8	3	13	27	48	−21	19
11	FC Shakhtar Oleksandriya	24	6	5	13	22	39	−17	17
12	FC Avanhard Sumy	24	4	8	12	32	45	−13	16
13	FC Avanhard Kramatorsk	24	5	5	14	28	47	−19	15

== Second stage ==
=== Places 1–6 ===
Pos	Team	Pld	W	D	L	GF	GA	GD	Pts	Promotion
1	FC Trudovi Rezervy Luhansk (C, P)	10	6	4	0	22	11	+11	16	Promoted
2	FC Chornomorets Odesa (P)	10	4	3	3	13	9	+4	11	Promoted
3	FC Avanhard Simferopol	10	3	4	3	12	14	−2	10	
4	SKA Odessa	10	3	2	5	11	10	+1	8	
5	FC Polissya Zhytomyr	10	3	2	5	10	15	−5	8	
6	FC Metalurh Zaporizhia (P)	10	1	5	4	13	22	−9	7	Promoted

(C) Champions; (P) Promoted

=== Places 7–17 ===
Pos	Team	Pld	W	D	L	GF	GA	GD	Pts	Promotion
7	SKA Lviv	10	5	5	0	18	6	+12	15	
8	FC Kolhospnyk Cherkasy	10	5	3	2	19	13	+6	13	
9	FC Lokomotyv Donetsk	10	3	5	2	12	10	+2	11	
10	SKA Kiev	10	5	1	4	18	17	+1	11	
11	FC Dnipro Dnipropetrovsk (P)	10	4	3	3	11	10	+1	11	Promoted
12	FC Azovstal Zhdanov	10	3	5	2	14	13	+1	11	
13	FC Desna Chernihiv	10	1	7	2	7	9	−2	9	
14	FC Kolhospnyk Rivno	10	4	1	5	10	13	−3	9	
15	FC Dniprovets Dniprodzerzhynsk	10	2	4	4	7	12	−5	8	
16	FC Lokomotyv Vinnytsia	10	2	2	6	10	13	−3	6	
17	FC Avanhard Zhovti Vody	10	2	2	6	12	22	−10	6	

(P) Promoted

=== Places 18–28 ===
Pos	Team	Pld	W	D	L	GF	GA	GD	Pts
18	FC Torpedo Kharkiv	10	6	2	2	15	9	+6	14
19	FC Dynamo Khmelnytskyi	10	6	2	2	16	11	+5	14
20	FC Sudnobudivnyk Mykolaiv	10	5	2	3	16	10	+6	12
21	FC Avanhard Ternopil	10	5	2	3	13	15	−2	12
22	FC Arsenal Kyiv	10	4	2	4	16	11	+5	10
23	FC Dynamo Kirovohrad	10	3	4	3	11	7	+4	10
24	SC Navy Sevastopol	10	4	2	4	13	11	+2	10
25	FC Trubnyk Nikopol	10	4	1	5	18	19	−1	9
26	FC Khimik Severodonetsk	10	3	3	4	8	14	−6	9
27	FC Mayak Kherson	10	1	3	6	12	21	−9	5
28	FC Shakhtar Kadiivka	10	0	5	5	9	19	−10	5

=== Places 29–39 ===
Pos	Team	Pld	W	D	L	GF	GA	GD	Pts
29	FC Avanhard Chernivtsi	10	6	2	2	15	6	+9	14
30	FC Avanhard Kramatorsk	10	6	2	2	20	12	+8	14
31	FC Shakhtar Oleksandriya	10	4	5	1	12	6	+6	13
32	FC Shakhtar Horlivka	10	4	5	1	12	8	+4	13
33	FC Spartak Stanislav	10	4	3	3	9	10	−1	11
34	FC Kolhospnyk Poltava	10	3	4	3	14	11	+3	10
35	FC Naftovyk Drohobych	10	2	4	4	12	13	−1	8
36	FC Verkhovyna Uzhhorod	10	1	5	4	5	11	−6	7
37	FC Hirnyk Kryvyi Rih	10	2	3	5	12	19	−7	7
38	FC Volyn Lutsk	10	2	3	5	9	18	−9	7
39	FC Avanhard Sumy	10	1	4	5	6	12	−6	6

== Relegation play-offs ==
- FC Volyn Lutsk – Volodymyr-Volynskyi 2:1 2:0
- FC Lokomotyv Vinnytsia – Burevisnyk Vinnytsia 4:0 0:0
- FC Verkhovyna Uzhhorod – Tochprylad Mukacheve 6:0 1:0
- FC Shakhtar Oleksandriya – Avanhard KremHESstroi 2:1 3:0
- FC Metalurh Kerch – SC Navy Sevastopol 2:1 1:0
- FC Kolhospnyk Poltava – Dnipro Kremenchuk 2:1 1:0
- FC Metalurh Zaporizhia – Azovets Berdyansk 1:0 1:0
- FC Kolhospnyk Rivno – Spartak Rivno 6:0 3:0
- FC Shakhtar Kadiivka – Metalurh Komunarsk 0:0 2:0
- FC Avanhard Sumy – SVADKU Sumy 2:0 3:1
- Naftovyk Drohobych – FC Silmash Lviv 2:1 0:3
- FC Sudnobudivnyk Mykolaiv – Vympel Mykolaiv 6:1 2:0
- FC Avanhard Ternopil – Burevisnyk Kremenets 2:1 2:0
- FC Torpedo Kharkiv – Start Chuhuiv 0:2 4:1
- FC Mayak Kherson – Enerhiya Nova Kakhovka 3:0 0:0
- FC Dynamo Khmelnytskyi – Avanhard Kamianets-Podilskyi 3:0 4:1
- FC Kolhospnyk Cherkasy – Lokomotyv Zolotonosha 3:0 4:1
- FC Avanhard Chernivtsi – Kolhospnyk Kitsman 6:1 7:0
- FC Desna Chernihiv – Pryluky 9:0 3:1
- FC Arsenal Kyiv – Temp Kyiv 2:0 2:3
- FC Spartak Ivano-Frankivsk – Avanhard Perehinske 1:1 2:0
- FC Metalurh Yenakieve – Shakhtar Horlivka 0:0 1:0
- FC Hirnyk Kryvyi Rih – ?

Please, note that FC Silmash Lviv next season was reformed into better known FC Karpaty Lviv and right away admitted to the Soviet Class A.

== See also ==
- Soviet Second League
