= 1967 Ukrainian Class B =

Football Championship of Ukrainian SSR
- Season: 1967
- Champions: FC Avtomobilist Zhytomyr
- Promoted: FC Avtomobilist Zhytomyr; FC Khimik Severodonetsk; FC Dnipro Kremenchuk; SKCF Sevastopol; FC Kryvbas Kryvyi Rih; FC Lokomotyv Kherson; FC Kolos Poltava; FC Azovets Zhdanov
- Relegated: FC Chayka-VMS Sevastopol (withdrew)

The 1967 Football Championship of Ukrainian SSR (Class B) was the 37th season of association football competition of the Ukrainian SSR, which was part of the Ukrainian Class B. It was the seventeenth in the Soviet Class B and the fifth season of the Ukrainian Class B.

The 1967 Football Championship of Ukrainian SSR (Class B) was won by FC Avtomobilist Zhytomyr.

== Zone 1 (West) ==
=== Location map ===
Locations of teams in Class B

=== Relegated teams ===
- none

=== Promoted teams ===
- FC Enerhiya Nova Kakhovka
- FC Energiya Tiraspol (1965 champions of the Football Championship of the Moldavian SSR)
- FC Stroitel Beltsy (1966 champions of the Football Championship of the Moldavian SSR)

=== Relocated and renamed teams ===
- FC Avtomobilist Zhytomyr was called as FC Polissya Zhytomyr
- FC Horyn Rivne was called as FC Kolhospnyk Rivne
- FC Dnipro Cherkasy was called as FC Kolhospnyk Cherkasy
- SC Prometei Dniprodzerzhynsk was called as FC Dniprovets Dniprodzerzhynsk

=== Final standings ===
| Pos | Team | Pld | W | D | L | GF | GA | GD | Pts | Promotion or qualification |
|---|---|---|---|---|---|---|---|---|---|---|
| 1 | FC Avtomobilist Zhytomyr | 40 | 23 | 13 | 4 | 45 | 12 | +33 | 59 | Qualified for Final stage |
| 2 | FC Dnipro Cherkasy | 40 | 19 | 12 | 9 | 46 | 22 | +24 | 50 | Qualified for Final stage |
| 3 | FC Dnipro Kremenchuk | 40 | 22 | 6 | 12 | 51 | 33 | +18 | 50 | Qualified for Final stage |
| 4 | SKCF Sevastopol | 40 | 19 | 10 | 11 | 41 | 33 | +8 | 48 | Promoted |
| 5 | FC Kryvbas Kryvyi Rih | 40 | 15 | 17 | 8 | 46 | 36 | +10 | 47 | Promoted |
| 6 | FC Avanhard Ternopil | 40 | 15 | 17 | 8 | 36 | 28 | +8 | 47 | |
| 7 | FC Trubnyk Nikopol | 40 | 16 | 13 | 11 | 41 | 28 | +13 | 45 | |
| 8 | FC Desna Chernihiv | 40 | 17 | 11 | 12 | 44 | 33 | +11 | 45 | |
| 9 | FC Dynamo Khmelnytskyi | 40 | 13 | 17 | 10 | 40 | 31 | +9 | 43 | |
| 10 | FC Horyn Rivne | 40 | 13 | 15 | 12 | 37 | 35 | +2 | 41 | |
| 11 | FC Verkhovyna Uzhhorod | 40 | 14 | 12 | 14 | 35 | 35 | 0 | 40 | |
| 12 | FC Spartak Ivano-Frankivsk | 40 | 11 | 13 | 16 | 37 | 36 | +1 | 35 | |
| 13 | FC Shakhtar Oleksandriya | 40 | 12 | 11 | 17 | 34 | 45 | −11 | 35 | |
| 14 | FC Bukovyna Chernivtsi | 40 | 11 | 12 | 17 | 44 | 53 | −9 | 34 | |
| 15 | FC Energiya Tiraspol | 40 | 9 | 16 | 15 | 24 | 42 | −18 | 34 | |
| 16 | SC Prometei Dniprodzerzhynsk | 40 | 9 | 14 | 17 | 33 | 44 | −11 | 32 | |
| 17 | FC Stroitel Beltsy | 40 | 10 | 12 | 18 | 26 | 39 | −13 | 32 | |
| 18 | FC Enerhiya Nova Kakhovka | 40 | 9 | 14 | 17 | 24 | 41 | −17 | 32 | |
| 19 | FC Volyn Lutsk | 40 | 8 | 15 | 17 | 32 | 41 | −9 | 31 | |
| 20 | FC Naftovyk Drohobych | 40 | 7 | 16 | 17 | 40 | 57 | −17 | 30 | |
| 21 | FC Dunayets Izmayil | 40 | 11 | 8 | 21 | 30 | 62 | −32 | 30 | |

== Zone 2 ==
=== Location map ===
Locations of teams in Class B
Locations of teams in Class B (Donetsk Oblast only)
Locations of teams in Class B (Luhansk Oblast only)

=== Relegated teams ===
- none

=== Promoted teams ===
- FC Stal Dnipropetrovsk
- FC Sitall Kostiantynivka

=== Relocated and renamed teams ===
- none

=== Final standings ===
| Pos | Team | Pld | W | D | L | GF | GA | GD | Pts | Promotion or qualification |
|---|---|---|---|---|---|---|---|---|---|---|
| 1 | FC Khimik Severodonetsk | 40 | 24 | 10 | 6 | 81 | 34 | +47 | 58 | Qualified for Final stage |
| 2 | FC Torpedo Kharkiv | 40 | 21 | 14 | 5 | 62 | 20 | +42 | 56 | Qualified for Final stage |
| 3 | FC Shakhtar Kadiivka | 40 | 21 | 14 | 5 | 59 | 28 | +31 | 56 | Qualified for Final stage |
| 4 | FC Chayka Sevastopol | 40 | 20 | 14 | 6 | 48 | 21 | +27 | 54 | Withdrew |
| 5 | FC Lokomotyv Kherson | 40 | 22 | 9 | 9 | 74 | 32 | +42 | 53 | Promoted |
| 6 | FC Shakhtar Horlivka | 40 | 14 | 17 | 9 | 39 | 29 | +10 | 45 | |
| 7 | FC Komunarets Komunarsk | 40 | 18 | 9 | 13 | 42 | 43 | −1 | 45 | |
| 8 | FC Spartak Sumy | 40 | 13 | 17 | 10 | 45 | 36 | +9 | 43 | |
| 9 | FC Lokomotyv Donetsk | 40 | 14 | 15 | 11 | 40 | 41 | −1 | 43 | |
| 10 | FC Kolos Poltava | 40 | 13 | 14 | 13 | 37 | 38 | −1 | 40 | Promoted |
| 11 | FC Shakhtar Krasnyi Luch | 40 | 11 | 18 | 11 | 43 | 48 | −5 | 40 | |
| 12 | FC Azovets Zhdanov | 40 | 16 | 7 | 17 | 50 | 42 | +8 | 39 | Promoted |
| 13 | FC Avanhard Makiivka | 40 | 12 | 15 | 13 | 30 | 35 | −5 | 39 | |
| 14 | FC Stal Dnipropetrovsk | 40 | 13 | 12 | 15 | 39 | 37 | +2 | 38 | |
| 15 | FC Start Dzerzhynsk | 40 | 11 | 16 | 13 | 34 | 37 | −3 | 38 | |
| 16 | FC Avanhard Kramatorsk | 40 | 10 | 14 | 16 | 46 | 52 | −6 | 34 | |
| 17 | FC Shakhtar Yenakieve | 40 | 6 | 16 | 18 | 24 | 71 | −47 | 28 | |
| 18 | FC Sitall Kostiantynivka | 40 | 8 | 11 | 21 | 23 | 53 | −30 | 27 | |
| 19 | FC Torpedo Berdyansk | 40 | 6 | 14 | 20 | 27 | 57 | −30 | 26 | |
| 20 | FC Avanhard Kerch | 40 | 5 | 12 | 23 | 22 | 52 | −30 | 22 | |
| 21 | FC Shakhtar Torez | 40 | 4 | 8 | 28 | 22 | 81 | −59 | 16 | |

== Final stage ==
| Pos | Team | Pld | W | D | L | GF | GA | GD | Pts | Promotion |
|---|---|---|---|---|---|---|---|---|---|---|
| 1 | FC Avtomobilist Zhytomyr (C, P) | 5 | 4 | 1 | 0 | 7 | 2 | +5 | 9 | Promoted |
| 2 | FC Khimik Severodonetsk (P) | 5 | 3 | 2 | 0 | 11 | 3 | +8 | 8 | Promoted |
| 3 | FC Dnipro Kremenchuk (P) | 5 | 2 | 1 | 2 | 2 | 2 | 0 | 5 | Promoted |
| 4 | FC Torpedo Kharkiv | 5 | 2 | 0 | 3 | 3 | 6 | −3 | 4 | |
| 5 | FC Shakhtar Kadiivka | 5 | 1 | 0 | 4 | 3 | 7 | −4 | 2 | |
| 6 | FC Dnipro Cherkasy | 5 | 1 | 0 | 4 | 4 | 10 | −6 | 2 | |

(C) Champions; (P) Promoted

== See also ==
- Soviet Second League
