= 1969 Ukrainian Class B =

Football Championship of Ukrainian SSR
- Season: 1969
- Champions: FC Spartak Ivano-Frankivsk
- Promoted: FC Spartak Ivano-Frankivsk; FC Shakhtar Horlivka; FC Spartak Sumy
- Relegated: 15 clubs

The 1969 Football Championship of Ukrainian SSR (Class B) was the 39th season of association football competition of the Ukrainian SSR, which was part of the Ukrainian Class B. It was the nineteenth in the Soviet Class B and the seventh season of the Ukrainian Class B.

The 1969 Football Championship of Ukrainian SSR (Class B) was won by FC Spartak Ivano-Frankivsk.

== Zone 1 (West) ==
=== Location map ===
Locations of teams in Class B

=== Relegated teams ===
Two clubs were relegated from the 1968 Second Group (Class A), subgroup 2.

- FC Dnipro Kremenchuk
- FC Avanhard Zhovti Vody

=== Promoted teams ===
- FC Budivelnyk Pervomaisk

=== Relocated and renamed teams ===
- none

=== Final standings ===
Pos	Team	Pld	W	D	L	GF	GA	GD	Pts	Qualification
1	FC Spartak Ivano-Frankivsk	40	20	17	3	52	21	+31	57	Qualified for Final stage
2	SC Prometei Dniprodzerzhynsk	40	21	11	8	60	32	+28	53	Qualified for Final stage
3	FC Karpaty Mukacheve	40	18	15	7	50	23	+27	51	Qualified for Final stage
4	FC Trubnyk Nikopol	40	17	17	6	51	26	+25	51	
5	FC Dnipro Kremenchuk	40	17	15	8	45	27	+18	49	Withdrew
6	FC Dnestr Tiraspol	40	15	16	9	31	23	+8	46	Withdrew
7	FC Horyn Rivne	40	18	10	12	39	34	+5	46	
8	FC Avanhard Zhovti Vody	40	14	16	10	29	26	+3	44	
9	FC Shakhtar Chervonohrad	40	12	20	8	19	16	+3	44	
10	FC Naftovyk Drohobych	40	17	9	14	35	35	0	43	
11	FC Verkhovyna Uzhhorod	40	13	16	11	34	34	0	42	
12	FC Podillya Kamianets-Podilskyi	40	11	17	12	37	35	+2	39	
13	FC Shakhtar Oleksandriya	40	13	13	14	34	45	−11	39	
14	FC Prohres Berdychiv	40	11	16	13	30	39	−9	38	Withdrew
15	FC Budivelnyk Pervomaisk	40	10	16	14	22	37	−15	36	Withdrew
16	FC Enerhiya Nova Kakhovka	40	9	16	15	27	33	−6	34	
17	FC Pishchevik Beltsy	40	9	15	16	26	37	−11	33	Withdrew
18	FC Torpedo Lutsk	40	7	17	16	21	41	−20	31	
19	FC Dnipro Cherkasy	40	8	13	19	21	36	−15	29	
20	FC Nistrul Bendery	40	9	9	22	25	49	−24	27	Withdrew
21	FC Dunayets Izmayil	40	2	4	34	6	45	−39	0 (Note: 8 points deducted.)	Withdrew

== Zone 2 ==
=== Location map ===
Locations of teams in Class B
Locations of teams in Class B (Donetsk Oblast only)
Locations of teams in Class B (Luhansk Oblast only)

=== Relegated teams ===
One club was relegated from the 1968 Second Group (Class A), subgroup 2.

- SKCF Sevastopol

=== Promoted teams ===
- FC Avanhard Antratsyt

=== Relocated and renamed teams ===
- none

=== Final standings ===
Pos	Team	Pld	W	D	L	GF	GA	GD	Pts	Qualification
1	FC Spartak Sumy	40	21	15	4	53	17	+36	57	Qualified for Final stage
2	FC Shakhtar Horlivka	40	20	13	7	64	31	+33	53	Qualified for Final stage
3	FC Shakhtar Sverdlovsk	40	19	15	6	50	28	+22	53	Qualified for Final stage
4	FC Komunarets Komunarsk	40	16	16	8	42	29	+13	48	
5	FC Avanhard Rovenky	40	16	14	10	44	32	+12	46	
6	FC Kolos Yakymivka	40	14	16	10	31	28	+3	44	Withdrew
7	FC Avanhard Antratsyt	40	15	13	12	36	28	+8	43	
8	SKCF Sevastopol	40	12	17	11	33	28	+5	41	
9	FC Avanhard Makiivka	40	13	15	12	35	37	−2	41	
10	FC Lokomotyv Dnipropetrovsk	40	9	22	9	31	23	+8	40	Withdrew
11	FC Avanhard Kramatorsk	40	12	16	12	31	30	+1	40	
12	FC Lokomotyv Donetsk	40	15	9	16	31	23	+8	39	
13	FC Torpedo Kharkiv	40	12	15	13	29	38	−9	39	Withdrew
14	FC Uholyok Krasnoarmiysk	40	15	8	17	34	36	−2	38	Withdrew
15	FC Torpedo Berdyansk	40	10	15	15	35	49	−14	35	
16	FC Industriya Yenakieve	40	11	12	17	23	39	−16	34	Withdrew
17	FC Start Dzerzhynsk	40	12	8	20	31	50	−19	32	Withdrew
18	FC Shakhtar Krasnyi Luch	40	9	12	19	37	56	−19	30	
19	FC Shakhtar Torez	40	8	14	18	20	39	−19	30	
20	FC Sitall Kostiantynivka	40	10	9	21	23	49	−26	29	Withdrew
21	FC Avanhard Kerch	40	9	10	21	22	45	−23	28	Withdrew

== Final stage ==
Pos	Team	Pld	W	D	L	GF	GA	GD	Pts	Promotion
1	FC Spartak Ivano-Frankivsk (C, P)	5	4	1	0	9	3	+6	9	Promoted
2	FC Shakhtar Horlivka (P)	5	3	1	1	5	2	+3	7	Promoted
3	FC Spartak Sumy (P)	5	3	0	2	5	5	0	6	Promoted
4	FC Karpaty Mukacheve	5	2	1	2	6	5	+1	5	
5	SC Prometei Dniprodzerzhynsk	5	1	0	4	3	7	−4	2	
6	FC Shakhtar Sverdlovsk	5	0	1	4	2	8	−6	1	

(C) Champions; (P) Promoted

== See also ==
- Soviet Second League
