= 1960 Ukrainian Class B =

Football Championship of Ukrainian SSR
- Season: 1960
- Champions: FC Metalurh Zaporizhia
- Relegated: none

The 1960 Football Championship of Ukrainian SSR (Class B) was the 30th season of association football competition of the Ukrainian SSR, which was part of the Ukrainian Class B. It was the eleventh in the Soviet Class B.

The 1960 Football Championship of Ukrainian SSR (Class B) was won by FC Metalurh Zaporizhia.

== Format ==
In 1960 Class B football competitions were reorganized. Ukrainian teams of the 1959 Soviet Class B were filtered into a separate republican Class B football competitions that were administered by the Ukrainian sports organization (federation). The new competition obtained already existing member-clubs of the Class B that are based in Ukraine and almost the same number of clubs were added from regular republican competitions as part of expansion.

List of grandfathered clubs included 25 teams of masters, FC Sudnobudivnyk Mykolaiv (formerly Avanhard), FC Metalurh Dnipropetrovsk, FC Metalurh Zaporizhia, FC Spartak Kherson, FC Khimik Dniprodzerzhynsk, FC Kolhospnyk Cherkasy, FC Arsenal Kyiv, FC Zirka Kirovohrad, FC Polissya Zhytomyr (formerly Avanhard), FC Avanhard Kryvyi Rih (formerly Kryvyi Rih), FC Kolhospnyk Poltava, FC Lokomotyv Vinnytsia, SKA Odessa (formerly SKVO), FC Chornomorets Odesa, SKA Lviv (formerly SKVO), FC Spartak Uzhhorod, FC Kolhospnyk Rivno, SKCF Sevastopol, FC Avanhard Simferopol, FC Spartak Stanislav, FC Avanhard Ternopil, FC Trudovi Rezervy Luhansk, FC Lokomotyv Stalino, FC Shakhtar Kadiivka, and FC Shakhtar Horlivka. Some teams of masters had own amateur squad with the same names competing at republican competitions among which were SKA Odessa, Avanhard Mykolaiv and others.

They were joined by 11 more teams that obtained the teams of masters status, among which were newly created clubs FC Desna Chernihiv, FC Dynamo Khmelnytskyi, and FC Volyn Lutsk as well as already existing clubs FC Avanhard Chernivtsi, FC Avanhard Zhdanov, FC Naftovyk Drohobych, FC Avanhard Zhovti Vody, FC Khimik Severodonetsk, FC Avanhard Sumy, FC Avanhard Kramatorsk, and FC Torpedo Kharkiv.

== Location map ==
Locations of teams in Class B

== Zone 1 ==
=== Relegated teams ===
- none

=== Promoted teams ===
- FC Avanhard Chernihiv – (debut)
- FC Dynamo Khmelnytskyi – (debut)
- FC Volyn Lutsk – (debut)
- FC Avanhard Chernivtsi – (debut)
- FC Naftovyk Drohobych – (debut)

=== Relocated and renamed teams ===
- FC Sudnobudivnyk Mykolaiv was last year known as FC Avanhard Mykolaiv
- FC Polissya Zhytomyr was last year known as FC Avanhard Zhytomyr
- SKA Lviv was last year known as SKVO Lviv

=== League's standing ===
Pos	Team	Pld	W	D	L	GF	GA	GD	Pts
1	FC Sudnobudivnyk Mykolaiv	32	19	8	5	50	21	+29	46
2	FC Lokomotyv Vinnytsia	32	18	8	6	51	25	+26	44
3	FC Arsenal Kyiv	32	17	9	6	59	29	+30	43
4	FC Chornomorets Odesa	32	19	4	9	63	31	+32	42
5	FC Zirka Kirovohrad	32	16	9	7	64	37	+27	41
6	SKA Lviv	32	17	6	9	46	29	+17	40
7	FC Polissya Zhytomyr	32	16	6	10	58	38	+20	38
8	FC Avanhard Chernivtsi	32	14	9	9	47	41	+6	37
9	FC Kolhospnyk Rivno	32	14	8	10	42	40	+2	36
10	FC Avanhard Ternopil	32	10	7	15	33	44	−11	27
11	FC Verkhovyna Uzhhorod	32	6	14	12	29	39	−10	26
12	FC Kolhospnyk Cherkasy	32	8	10	14	31	46	−15	26
13	FC Volyn Lutsk	32	8	9	15	33	48	−15	25
14	FC Naftovyk Drohobych	32	6	10	16	32	58	−26	22
15	FC Spartak Stanislav	32	6	9	17	21	54	−33	21
16	FC Desna Chernihiv	32	5	6	21	29	62	−33	16
17	FC Dynamo Khmelnytskyi	32	3	8	21	18	64	−46	14

== Zone 2 ==
=== Relegated teams ===
- none

=== Promoted teams ===
- FC Avanhard Zhovti Vody – (debut)
- FC Khimik Severodonetsk – (debut)
- FC Avanhard Sumy – (debut)
- FC Avanhard Kramatorsk – (debut)
- FC Torpedo Kharkiv – (debut)
- FC Avanhard Zhdanov – (debut)

=== Relocated and renamed teams ===
- FC Avanhard Kryvyi Rih was last year known as Kryvyi Rih team
- SKA Odessa was last year known as SKVO Odessa

=== League's standing ===
Pos	Team	Pld	W	D	L	GF	GA	GD	Pts
1	FC Metalurh Zaporizhia	36	25	9	2	78	29	+49	59
2	SKA Odessa	36	25	8	3	69	24	+45	58
3	FC Trudovi Rezervy Luhansk	36	19	9	8	69	40	+29	47
4	FC Lokomotyv Stalino	36	19	8	9	45	31	+14	46
5	FC Avanhard Zhovti Vody	36	15	10	11	46	39	+7	40
6	SKF Sevastopol	36	15	9	12	49	34	+15	39
7	FC Avanhard Kramatorsk	36	13	12	11	41	35	+6	38
8	FC Metalurh Dnipropetrovsk	36	14	9	13	53	44	+9	37
9	FC Azovstal Zhdanov	36	11	12	13	30	42	−12	34
10	FC Shakhtar Horlivka	36	13	7	16	50	65	−15	33
11	FC Avanhard Simferopol	36	12	8	16	42	55	−13	32
12	FC Khimik Severodonetsk	36	11	8	17	38	44	−6	30
13	FC Kolhospnyk Poltava	36	10	9	17	45	51	−6	29
14	FC Avanhard Sumy	36	8	13	15	38	53	−15	29
15	FC Khimik Dniprodzerzhynsk	36	10	8	18	27	42	−15	28
16	FC Spartak Kherson	36	9	10	17	39	67	−28	28
17	FC Avanhard Kryvyi Rih	36	8	10	18	37	61	−24	26
18	FC Shakhtar Kadiivka	36	8	10	18	29	50	−21	26
19	FC Torpedo Kharkiv	36	6	13	17	36	55	−19	25

== Play-offs ==
=== Championship ===
- FC Sudnobudivnyk Mykolaiv – FC Metalurh Zaporizhia 2–6 0–0

=== Promotion ===
- FC Shakhtar Donetsk – FC Metalurh Zaporizhia 2–0 0–1

=== Relegation ===
- FC Volyn Lutsk – FC Shakhtar Novovolynsk 3–0 0–1
- FC Avanhard Kryvyi Rih – FC Metalurh Nikopol 3–0 5–3
- FC Polissya Zhytomyr – FC Shakhtar Korostyshev 1–3 5–0
- FC Spartak Uzhhorod – FC Avanhard Khust 4–1 1–1
- FC Zirka Kirovohrad – FC Shakhtar Oleksandriya 2–1 1–1
- FC Avanhard Simferopol – FC Metalurh Kerch 2–0 3–0
- FC Chornomorets Odesa – FC Dunayets Izmail 1–0 5–1
- FC Kolhospnyk Poltava – FC Lokomotyv Poltava 5–3 1–3 2–1 (Note: last game in Kryukiv, Kremenchuk)
- FC Kolhospnyk Rivno – FC Spartak Rivno 1–0 3–1
- FC Shakhtar Horlivka – FC Shvernik Mine Stalino 4–1 1–0
- FC Avanhard Sumy – FC Avanhard Konotop 7–0 3–0
- FC Avanhard Ternopil – FC Motor Ternopil 1–1 5–1
- FC Torpedo Kharkiv – FC Start Chuhuyiv 2–0 2–2
- FC Spartak Kherson – FC Enerhiya Nova Kakhovka 1–0 1–0
- FC Dynamo Khmelnytskyi – FC Avanhard Kamianets–Podilskyi 3–0 2–4
- FC Kolhospnyk Cherkasy – FC Spartak Uman 3–0 1–0
- FC Avanhard Chernivtsi – FC Spartak Chernivtsi 3–0 5–0
- FC Avanhard Chernihiv – FC Avanhard Pryluky 2–1 1–1
- FC Arsenal Kyiv – FC Oktyabrskyi Raion Kyiv 0–0 2–0
- FC Spartak Stanislav – FC Khimik Kalush 1–0 2–1
- FC Shakhtar Kadiivka – FC October Revolution Factory Luhansk 6–1 3–1
- FC Naftovyk Drohobych – FC Avanhard Vynnyky 2–0 3–0

Notes

- Games between FC Metalurh Zaporizhia, FC Sudnobudivnyk Mykolaiv and FC Lokomotyv Vinnytsia with champions of their respective oblasts were not conducted as the aforementioned teams finished in top three teams in each of the Class B zones.
- The champion of Kiev Oblast did not participate in relegation play-offs as the oblast did not have its own representative in the Class B competitions.

== See also ==
- Soviet First League
