= 1961 Ukrainian Class B =

Football Championship of Ukrainian SSR
- Season: 1961
- Champions: FC Chornomorets Odesa
- Relegated: none

The 1961 Football Championship of Ukrainian SSR (Class B) was the 31st season of association football competition of the Ukrainian SSR, which was part of the Ukrainian Class B. It was the twelfth in the Soviet Class B.

The 1961 Football Championship of Ukrainian SSR (Class B) was won by FC Chornomorets Odesa.

== Location map ==
Locations of teams in Class B

== Zone 1 ==
=== Relegated teams ===
- none

=== Promoted teams ===
- none

=== Relocated and renamed teams ===
- FC Mayak Kherson was last year known as FC Spartak Kherson
- FC Desna Chernihiv was last year known as FC Avanhard Chernihiv
- FC Verkhovyna Uzhhorod was last year known as FC Spartak Uzhhorod

=== League's standing ===
Pos	Team	Pld	W	D	L	GF	GA	GD	Pts
1	FC Chornomorets Odesa	34	26	5	3	66	23	+43	57
2	FC Lokomotyv Vinnytsia	34	21	8	5	56	27	+29	50
3	FC Zirka Kirovohrad	34	18	7	9	71	39	+32	43
4	SKA Lviv	34	17	8	9	42	30	+12	42
5	FC Desna Chernihiv	34	13	13	8	50	49	+1	39
6	FC Polissya Zhytomyr	34	13	8	13	47	41	+6	34
7	FC Sudnobudivnyk Mykolaiv	34	13	8	13	49	48	+1	34
8	FC Dynamo Khmelnytskyi	34	13	7	14	47	45	+2	33
9	FC Avanhard Chernivtsi	34	11	10	13	50	53	−3	32
10	FC Kolhospnyk Rivno	34	13	6	15	57	61	−4	32
11	FC Verkhovyna Uzhhorod	34	11	9	14	28	41	−13	31
12	FC Spartak Stanislav	34	13	5	16	48	64	−16	31
13	FC Mayak Kherson	34	10	10	14	33	39	−6	30
14	FC Avanhard Ternopil	34	12	6	16	46	52	−6	30
15	FC Arsenal Kyiv	34	10	9	15	49	45	+4	29
16	FC Kolhospnyk Cherkasy	34	9	10	15	25	47	−22	28
17	FC Naftovyk Drohobych	34	6	7	21	27	63	−36	19
18	FC Volyn Lutsk	34	5	8	21	33	57	−24	18

== Zone 2 ==
=== Relegated teams ===
- none

=== Promoted teams ===
- SKA Kiev – (debut)

=== Relocated and renamed teams ===
- SKF Sevastopol was last year known as SKCF Sevastopol
- FC Azovstal Zhdanov was last year known as FC Avanhard Zhdanov

=== League's standing ===
Pos	Team	Pld	W	D	L	GF	GA	GD	Pts
1	SKA Odessa	36	23	8	5	68	26	+42	54
2	FC Trudovi Rezervy Luhansk	36	22	7	7	56	23	+33	51
3	FC Avanhard Zhovti Vody	36	16	12	8	41	30	+11	44
4	FC Metalurh Zaporizhia	36	15	12	9	50	37	+13	42
5	FC Avanhard Simferopol	36	14	11	11	43	38	+5	39
6	FC Shakhtar Horlivka	36	13	12	11	47	46	+1	38
7	FC Khimik Severodonetsk	36	14	10	12	31	39	−8	38
8	SKF Sevastopol	36	12	13	11	56	46	+10	37
9	FC Kolhospnyk Poltava	36	12	12	12	40	39	+1	36
10	FC Avanhard Sumy	36	10	16	10	37	44	−7	36
11	FC Azovstal Zhdanov	36	11	12	13	36	37	−1	34
12	SKA Kiev	36	11	11	14	45	41	+4	33
13	FC Lokomotyv Stalino	36	11	11	14	43	52	−9	33
14	FC Metalurh Dnipropetrovsk	36	11	10	15	35	40	−5	32
15	FC Avanhard Kryvyi Rih	36	10	10	16	48	52	−4	30
16	FC Shakhtar Kadiivka	36	12	5	19	33	50	−17	29
17	FC Avanhard Kramatorsk	36	10	8	18	30	47	−17	28
18	FC Torpedo Kharkiv	36	7	11	18	34	56	−22	25
19	FC Khimik Dniprodzerzhynsk	36	6	13	17	25	55	−30	25

== Play-offs ==
- FC Chornomorets Odesa – SKA Odesa 2:1 0:0
- FC Lokomotyv Vinnytsia – FC Trudovi Rezervy Luhansk 0:0 2:0
- FC Zirka Kirovohrad – FC Avanhard Zhovti Vody 2:1 0:0
- SKA Lviv – FC Metalurh Zaporizhia 0:0 2:1
- FC Avanhard Simferopol – FC Desna Chernihiv 2:0 2:2
- FC Shakhtar Horlivka – FC Polissya Zhytomyr 3:1 2:1
- FC Sudnobudivnyk Mykolaiv – FC Khimik Severodonetsk 2:2 2:2
- SKF Sevastopol – FC Dynamo Khmelnytskyi 4:2 1:1
- FC Kolhospnyk Poltava – FC Avanhard Chernivtsi 1:0 2:3
- FC Avanhard Sumy – FC Kolhospnyk Rivno 2:1 1:1
- FC Azovstal Zhdanov – FC Verkhovyna Uzhhorod 0:0 0:0
- FC Spartak Stanislav – SKA Kiev 3:0 3:3
- FC Lokomotyv Stalino – FC Mayak Kherson 3:1 1:1
- FC Metalurh Dnipropetrovsk – FC Avanhard Ternopil 2:1 1:0
- FC Avanhard Kryvyi Rih – FC Arsenal Kyiv 1:0 1:0
- FC Shakhtar Kadiivka – FC Kolhospnyk Cherkasy 3:1 1:0
- FC Avanhard Kramatorsk – FC Naftovyk Drohobych 3:1 3:2
- FC Volyn Lutsk – FC Torpedo Kharkiv 2:0 1:3
- FC Khimik Dniprodzerzhynsk – bye

== Relegation play-offs ==
- FC Volyn Lutsk – GDO Vladimir-Volynskiy 4:2 1:1
- FC Khimik Dniprodzerzhynsk – FC Trubnyk Nikopol 0:0 0:2
- FC Polissya Zhytomyr – FC Chervona Zirka Malyn +:- (Note: withdrew)
- FC Verkhovyna Uzhhorod – FC Kolhospnyk Berehovo 1:1 0:0 2:0
- FC Zirka Kirovohrad – FC Shakhtar Oleksandriya 3:0 3:1
- SKF Sevastopol – FC Metalurh Kerch 2:0 2:0
- FC Metalurh Zaporizhia – FC Burevisnyk Melitopol 2:2 2:1
- FC Kolhospnyk Poltava – FC Lokomotyv Poltava 2:0 5:2
- FC Kolhospnyk Rivno – FC Spartak Rivno 2:1 1:1
- FC Shakhtar Kadiivka – FC Avanhard Sverdlovsk 2:1 2:0 0:0 (Note: replay of the first game due to technical issues)
- FC Avanhard Sumy – FC Ekran Shostka 4:2 1:1
- FC Avanhard Ternopil – FC Burevisnyk Kremenets 2:2 2:0
- FC Torpedo Kharkiv – FC Start Chuhuyiv 3:0 1:0
- FC Mayak Kherson – FC Enerhiya Nova Kakhovka 2:1 1:0
- FC Avanhard Kamianets-Podilskyi – FC Dynamo Khmelnytskyi 1:0 0:3
- FC Kolhospnyk Cherkasy – FC Shakhtar Vatutine 3:1 1:1
- FC Avanhard Chernivtsi – FC Mashynobudivnyk Chernivtsi 1:0 4:0
- FC Desna Chernihiv – FC Zirka Chernihiv 6:0 5:0
- FC Arsenal Kyiv – FC Temp Kyiv 2:1 3:1
- FC Spartak Stanislav – FC Khimik Kalush 1:0 2:1
- FC Avanhard Kramatorsk – FC Metalurh Yenakievo 4:0 1:2
- FC Naftovyk Drohobych – FC Silmash Lviv 1:1 3:1
- FC Sudnobudivnyk Mykolaiv – FC Torpedo Mykolaiv 1:1 2:0

Notes:

- Games between SKA Odessa and FC Lokomotyv Vinnytsia with champions of their respective oblasts were not conducted as the aforementioned teams finished in top three teams in each of the Class B zones.
- The champion of Kiev Oblast did not participate in relegation play-offs as the oblast did not have its own representative in the Class B competitions.
- FC Khimik Dniprodzerzhynsk has kept its place in the Class B competitions.
- FC Shakhtar Oleksandriya was promoted to the Class B even though it lost the relegation play-offs.

== See also ==
- Soviet Second League
