= 1958 Soviet Class B =

Class B
- Season: 1958
- Champions: SKVO Rostov-na-Donu
- Promoted: SKVO Rostov-na-Donu

The 1958 Soviet Football Championship, Class B (Russian: Чемпионат СССР по футболу 1958 (класс «Б»)) was the ninth season of the Soviet Class B football competitions since their establishment in 1950. It was also the eighteenth season of the Soviet second tier professional football competitions.

== Overview ==
It involved participation of 94 "teams of masters" split in six groups which were composed by regional principle to some extent. Compared with the previous season, the number of participants was increased by 30(!) teams and there were added two additional groups. The teams were distributed somewhat equally among the six groups with five groups containing 16 teams and one "Far East" group - 14.

Out of all 94 teams only one was set to receive promotion.

Six group winners qualified for the single round-robin final tournament which was won by SKVO Rostov-na-Donu. Note that SKVO Rostov-na-Donu won the league as a debutant. The winner of the final tournament gained promotion to the next season Class A competitions.

== Teams ==
=== Promoted ===
There were 32 teams that promoted from republican competitions.

- Russian Federation (19): Metallurg Stalingrad (champions), (Note: the 1957 RSFSR Football Championship) Trudoviye Rezervy Lipetsk (Group 10), Iskra Kazan (Mid-Ural Group), Dinamo Ulyanovsk, Energiya Volzhskiy (Lower Volga Group 12), Znamya Truda Orekhovo-Zuyevo, Trudoviye Rezervy Kursk, Trud Glukhovo, Volga Kalinin (Group 16), SKVO Rostov-na-Donu (semifinals), Shakhtyor Shakhty (semifinals), Temp Makhachkala (North Caucasus Group), Trud Astrakhan (Lower Volga Group 12), Zvezda Perm (Mid-Ural Group), Metallurg Magnitogorsk (semifinals), Khimik Berezniki (Mid-Ural Group), Metallurg Nizhniy Tagil, Lokomotiv Svobodny, Lokomotiv Ulan-Ude (Far Eastern Group)
- Ukraine (8): SKVO Odessa (champions), Spartak Kherson, Zvezda Kirovograd, Kolhospnik Cherkassy, Avangard Simferopol, Lokomotiv Vinnitsa, Kolhospnyk Rovno, Lokomotiv Artemovsk
- Other Union Republics (5): Burevestnik Tbilisi, Shirak Leninakan (Champion of Armenia), Trudoviye Rezervy Tashkent, Pamir Leninabad, Shakhtyor Karaganda (3rd place, Kazakhstan)

=== Relegated ===
One team was relegated from Class A.

- Spartak Minsk

=== Renamed/relocated ===
There were 21 teams that changed their name before the season. Two more clubs changed their home cities. In 1957 several sports societies Burevestnik, Krasnoye Znamia and Pischevik were reorganized or disbanded and in their place was formed Trud sports society. Not all former "Pischevik" teams adopted the name of Trud because they were transferred to other sports societies. Also, some sports society of agricultural trade unions were named in languages of their home republics.

Complete list of renamed and relocated teams
- LTI Leningrad last season played as Burevestnik Leningrad (representing Leningrad Technological Institute with Burevestnik as student sports society)
- Traktor Stalingrad last season played as Torpedo Stalingrad
- RostSelMash Rostov-na-Donu last season played as Torpedo Rostov-na-Donu
- Trud Stalinogorsk last season played as Shakhtër Stalinogorsk.
- Textilshchik Ivanovo last season played as Krasnoye Znamya Ivanovo
- Raketa Gorkiy last season played in Sormovo as Avangard Sormovo
- Chernomorets Odessa last season played as Pishchevik Odessa
- Baltika Kaliningrad last season played as Pishchevik Kaliningrad
- Mashinostroitel Sverdlovsk last season played as Avangard Sverdlovsk
- Devon Ufa last season played as Neftyanik Ufa
- Hosilot Stalinabad last season played as Urozhai Stalinabad
- Tomich Tomsk last season played as Burevestnik Tomsk
- Luch Vladivostok last season played as Dinamo Vladivostok
- Khimik Kemerovo last season played as Shakhtër Kemerovo
- Irtysh Omsk last season played as Krasnaya Zvezda Omsk
- Volga Kalinin last season played as Khimik Kalinin
- Zvezda Kirovograd last season played as Torpedo Kirovograd
- Avangard Simferopol last season played as Burevestnik Simferopol
- Temp Makhachkala last season played as Dinamo Makhachkala
- Trud Astrakhan last season played as Pischevik Astrakhan
- Zvezda Perm last season played as SC imeni Kalinina Molotov
- Lokomotiv Stalino during the season moved from Artëmovsk (Bakhmut) to Stalino (Donetsk)

== First stage ==
=== Zone I ===
Pos	Rep	Team	Pld	W	D	L	GF	GA	GD	Pts
1	UKR	SKVO Odessa	30	19	7	4	51	15	+36	45
2	RUS	Trudoviye Rezervy Leningrad	30	16	10	4	52	23	+29	42
3	UKR	Avangard Nikolayev	30	15	10	5	40	26	+14	40
4	RUS	Traktor Stalingrad (Note: Traktor Stalingrad was called Torpedo.)	30	16	7	7	46	22	+24	39
5	RUS	Torpedo Taganrog	30	17	4	9	40	24	+16	38
6	RUS	Torpedo Gorkiy	30	12	10	8	48	40	+8	34
7	RUS	Lokomotiv Saratov	30	13	7	10	48	39	+9	33
8	RUS	Krylya Sovetov Voronezh	30	13	5	12	45	35	+10	31
9	RUS	Dinamo Kirov	30	13	4	13	52	41	+11	30
10	RUS	Zenit Izhevsk	30	12	5	13	36	32	+4	29
11	UKR	Spartak Kherson	30	9	10	11	39	47	−8	28
12	RUS	Trudoviye Rezervy Lipetsk	30	7	7	16	27	57	−30	21
13	UKR	Zvezda Kirovograd	30	7	5	18	35	53	−18	19
14	RUS	Iskra Kazan	30	7	4	19	24	56	−32	18
15	RUS	Dinamo Ulyanovsk	30	8	1	21	36	79	−43	17
16	RUS	Energiya Volzhskiy	30	5	6	19	27	57	−30	16

=== Number of teams by republics ===
Number	Union republics	Team(s)
12	Russian SFSR	FC Trudovye Rezervy Leningrad, FC Traktor Stalingrad, FC Torpedo Taganrog, FC Torpedo Gorkiy, FC Lokomotiv Saratov, FC Krylya Sovetov Voronezh, FC Dinamo Kirov, FC Zenit Izhevsk, FC Trudoviye Rezervy Lipetsk, FC Iskra Kazan, FC Dinamo Ulyanovsk, FC Energia Volzhskiy
4	Ukrainian SSR	SKVO Odessa, FC Avangard Nikolayev, FC Spartak Kherson, FC Zirka Kirovograd

=== Zone II ===
Pos	Rep	Team	Pld	W	D	L	GF	GA	GD	Pts
1	UKR	SKCF Sevastopol	30	16	9	5	52	23	+29	41
2	UKR	Metallurg Zaporozhye	30	17	5	8	55	29	+26	39
3	RUS	RostSelMash Rostov-na-Donu (Note: RostSelMash Rostov-na-Donu was called Torpedo.)	30	18	3	9	62	35	+27	39
4	RUS	Trud Stalinogorsk (Note: Trud Stalinogorsk was called Shakhtyor.)	30	16	4	10	37	36	+1	36
5	RUS	Textilshchik Ivanovo (Note: Textilshchik Ivanovo was called Krasnoye Znamya.)	30	15	5	10	36	29	+7	35
6	UKR	Trudoviye Rezervy Lugansk	30	12	10	8	35	26	+9	34
7	UKR	Kolhospnik Poltava	30	12	10	8	32	27	+5	34
8	RUS	Khimik Yaroslavl	30	14	6	10	41	37	+4	34
9	UKR	Metallurg Dnepropetrovsk	30	14	5	11	52	45	+7	33
10	RUS	Znamya Truda Orekhovo-Zuyevo	30	11	9	10	34	51	−17	31
11	UKR	Avangard Kharkov	30	10	8	12	39	35	+4	28
12	RUS	Raketa Gorkiy (Note: Raketa Gorkiy was called Avangard Sormovo (before relocation).)	30	7	11	12	33	43	−10	25
13	UKR	Kolhospnik Cherkassy	30	5	11	14	22	35	−13	21
14	UKR	Khimik Dneprodzerzhinsk	30	6	6	18	24	45	−21	18
15	UKR	Avangard Simferopol	30	5	7	18	21	43	−22	17
16	RUS	Trudoviye Rezervy Kursk	30	5	5	20	27	63	−36	15

=== Number of teams by republics ===
Number	Union republics	Team(s)
9	Ukrainian SSR	SKCF Sevastopol, FC Metallurg Zaporozhye, FC Trudoviye Rezervy Lugansk, FC Kolgospnik Poltava, FC Metallurg Dnepropetrovsk, FC Avangard Kharkov, FC Kolgospnik Cherkassy, FC Khimik Dneprodzerzhinsk, FC Avangard Simferopol
7	Russian SFSR	FC Rostselmash Rostov-na-Donu, FC Trud Stalinogorsk, FC Tekstilschik Ivanovo, FC Khimik Yaroslavl, FC Znamya Truda Orekhovo-Zuyevo, FC Raketa Gorkiy, FC Trudoviye Rezervy Kursk

=== Zone III ===
Pos	Rep	Team	Pld	W	D	L	GF	GA	GD	Pts	Qualification
1	UKR	SKVO Lvov	30	18	7	5	45	26	+19	43	Advanced to next stage
2	BLR	Spartak Minsk	30	18	5	7	56	25	+31	41	
3	UKR	Lokomotiv Vinnitsa	30	14	7	9	42	37	+5	35	
4	UKR	Spartak Uzhgorod	30	11	13	6	36	33	+3	35	
5	UKR	Spartak Stanislav	30	13	7	10	43	34	+9	33	
6	RUS	Trud Glukhovo	30	11	11	8	32	29	+3	33	
7	EST	Dinamo Tallinn	30	10	12	8	44	37	+7	32	
8	UKR	SKVO Kiev	30	11	9	10	44	38	+6	31	
9	BLR	Urozhai Minsk	30	9	13	8	33	31	+2	31	
10	LTU	Spartak Vilnius	30	9	11	10	31	31	0	29	
11	RUS	Volga Kalinin	30	9	10	11	36	34	+2	28	
12	UKR	Chernomorets Odessa (Note: Chernomorets Odessa was called Pishchevik.)	30	9	8	13	33	42	−9	26	Relegation play-off
13	LVA	Daugava Riga	30	8	6	16	38	51	−13	22	
14	UKR	Kolhospnyk Rovno	30	7	8	15	44	65	−21	22	
15	RUS	Baltika Kaliningrad (Note: Baltika Kaliningrad was called Pishchevik.)	30	5	10	15	29	46	−17	20	
16	RUS	LTI Leningrad	30	5	9	16	32	59	−27	19	Relegation

=== Number of teams by republics ===
Number	Union republics	Team(s)
7	Ukrainian SSR	SKVO Lvov, FC Lokomotiv Vinnitsa, FC Spartak Uzhgorod, FC Spartak Stanislav, SKVO Kiev, FC Chernomorets Odessa, FC Kolgospnik Rovno
4	Russian SFSR	FC Trud Glukhovo, FC Volga Kalinin, FC Baltika Kaliningrad, FC LTI Leningrad
2	Belarusian SSR	FC Spartak Minsk, FC Urozhai Minsk
1	Estonian SSR	FC Dinamo Tallinn
1	Lithuanian SSR	FC Spartak Vilnius
1	Latvian SSR	FC Daugava Riga

=== Zone IV ===
Pos	Rep	Team	Pld	W	D	L	GF	GA	GD	Pts	Qualification
1	RUS	SKVO Rostov-na-Donu	30	18	7	5	72	24	+48	43	Advanced to next stage
2	ARM	Spartak Yerevan	30	17	9	4	47	15	+32	43	
3	RUS	Kuban Krasnodar	30	18	5	7	60	34	+26	41	
4	GEO	Lokomotiv Kutaisi	30	17	6	7	66	35	+31	40	
5	GEO	Burevestnik Tbilisi	30	14	10	6	57	36	+21	38	
6	GEO	SKVO Tbilisi	30	15	5	10	50	40	+10	35	
7	AZE	Neftyanik Baku	30	12	10	8	46	39	+7	34	
8	RUS	Terek Grozny	30	14	5	11	46	49	−3	33	
9	UKR	Lokomotiv Stalino (Note: In the first half of the season Lokomotiv Stalino was based in Artëmovsk.)	30	12	6	12	53	55	−2	30	
10	UKR	Shakhtyor Kadiyevka	30	10	9	11	40	38	+2	29	
11	RUS	Shakhtyor Shakhty	30	8	7	15	29	44	−15	23	
12	RUS	Metallurg Stalingrad	30	9	5	16	28	52	−24	23	
13	RUS	Spartak Stavropol	30	6	11	13	29	56	−27	23	
14	ARM	Shirak Leninakan	30	8	3	19	22	44	−22	19	
15	RUS	Temp Makhachkala	30	5	5	20	25	56	−31	15	
16	RUS	Trud Astrakhan	30	4	3	23	24	77	−53	11	Relegation

==== Play-off for 1st place ====
[in Tbilisi]

- SKVO Rostov-na-Donu 2-1 Spartak Yerevan

=== Number of teams by republics ===
Number	Union republics	Team(s)
8	Russian SFSR	SKVO Rostov-na-Donu, FC Kuban Krasnodar, FC Terek Grozny, FC Shakhter Shakhty, FC Metallurg Stalingrad, FC Spartak Stavropol, FC Temp Makhachkala, FC Trud Astrakhan
3	Georgian SSR	FC Lokomotiv Kutaisi, FC Burevestnik Tbilisi, FC SKVO Tbilisi
2	Armenian SSR	FC Spartak Yerevan, FC Shirak Leninakan
2	Ukrainian SSR	FC Lokomotiv Stalino, FC Shakhter Kadievka
1	Azerbaijan SSR	FC Neftyanik Baku

=== Zone V ===
Pos	Rep	Team	Pld	W	D	L	GF	GA	GD	Pts
1	RUS	SKVO Sverdlovsk	30	23	5	2	79	19	+60	51
2	KAZ	Kayrat Alma-Ata	30	20	5	5	62	20	+42	45
3	RUS	Zvezda Perm	30	18	7	5	52	22	+30	43
4	UZB	Pahtakor Tashkent	30	14	10	6	55	33	+22	38
5	RUS	Lokomotiv Chelyabinsk	30	14	9	7	55	36	+19	37
6	RUS	Mashinostroitel Sverdlovsk (Note: Mashinostroitel Sverdlovsk was called Avangard.)	30	15	5	10	52	38	+14	35
7	RUS	Devon Ufa (Note: Devon Ufa was called Neftyanik.)	30	9	12	9	43	45	−2	30
8	UZB	Trudoviye Rezervy Tashkent	30	10	9	11	41	42	−1	29
9	TKM	Kolhozchi Ashkhabad	30	12	4	14	44	44	0	28
10	RUS	Metallurg Magnitogorsk	30	9	10	11	49	50	−1	28
11	KGZ	Spartak Frunze	30	10	6	14	39	52	−13	26
12	TJK	Pamir Leninabad	30	9	6	15	35	52	−17	24
13	KAZ	Shakhtyor Karaganda	30	6	10	14	36	56	−20	22
14	RUS	Khimik Berezniki	30	7	6	17	39	86	−47	20
15	RUS	Metallurg Nizhniy Tagil	30	4	10	16	34	63	−29	18
16	TJK	Hosilot Stalinabad (Note: Hosilot Stalinabad was called Urozhai.)	30	1	4	25	27	84	−57	6

=== Number of teams by republics ===
Number	Union republics	Team(s)
8	Russian SFSR	SKVO Sverdlovsk, FC Zvezda Perm, FC Lokomotiv Chelyabinsk, FC Mashinostroitel Sverdlovsk, FC Devon Ufa, FC Metallurg Magnitogorsk, FC Khimik Berezniki, FC Metallurg Nizhniy Tagil
2	Kazakh SSR	FC Kairat Alma-Ata, FCShakhter Karaganda
2	Uzbek SSR	FC Pakhtakor Tashkent, FC Trudoviye Rezervy Tashkent
2	Tajik SSR	FC Pamir Leninabad, FC Khosilot Stalinabad
1	Turkmen SSR	FC Kolkhozchi Ashkhabad
1	Kyrgyz SSR	FC Spartak Frunze

=== Zone VI ===
[All teams are from Russian Federation]

Pos	Rep	Team	Pld	W	D	L	GF	GA	GD	Pts
1		SKVO Khabarovsk	26	14	7	5	47	29	+18	35
2		Tomich Tomsk (Note: Tomich Tomsk was called Burevestnik.)	26	13	7	6	47	29	+18	33
3		Urozhai Barnaul	26	14	5	7	47	32	+15	33
4		SibSelMash Novosibirsk	26	11	8	7	43	28	+15	30
5		Luch Vladivostok (Note: Luch Vladivostok was called Dinamo.)	26	12	5	9	39	28	+11	29
6		Energiya Irkutsk	26	11	7	8	39	34	+5	29
7		Khimik Kemerovo (Note: Khimik Kemerovo was called Shakhtyor.)	26	13	3	10	43	42	+1	29
8		Lokomotiv Komsomolsk-na-Amure	26	10	7	9	40	33	+7	27
9		Lokomotiv Krasnoyarsk	26	8	8	10	37	40	−3	24
10		Irtysh Omsk (Note: Irtysh Omsk was called Krasnaya Zvezda.)	26	8	7	11	41	41	0	23
11		Metallurg Stalinsk	26	8	7	11	28	31	−3	23
12		SKVO Chita	26	8	6	12	42	52	−10	22
13		Lokomotiv Svobodny	26	6	2	18	24	66	−42	14
14		Lokomotiv Ulan-Ude	26	3	7	16	18	50	−32	13

== Final stage ==
[Nov 5-22, Tbilisi] 

Pos	Rep	Team	Pld	W	D	L	GF	GA	GD	Pts	Promotion
1	RUS	SKVO Rostov-na-Donu	5	4	1	0	10	4	+6	9	Promoted
2	RUS	SKVO Sverdlovsk	5	3	2	0	14	6	+8	8	
3	UKR	SKCF Sevastopol	5	2	1	2	9	8	+1	5	
4	UKR	SKVO Odessa	5	1	1	3	9	11	−2	3	
5	UKR	SKVO Lvov	5	1	1	3	8	13	−5	3	
6	RUS	SKVO Khabarovsk	5	1	0	4	6	14	−8	2	

Source: rsssf.com

== See also ==
- 1958 Soviet Class A
- 1958 Soviet Cup
