= 1957 Soviet Class B =

Soviet Class B
- Season: 1957
- Champions: Avangard Leningrad (final group winner)
- Promoted: Avangard Leningrad
- Relegated: Krylia Sovetov Stupino (dissolved); Dinamo Vladivostok (dissolved)

The 1957 Soviet Football Championship in Class B (Russian: Первенство СССР 1957 года в классе «Б») was the 17th season of the Soviet second tier football league competition and the 8th since the formation of Class B. The competition consisted of two stages and involved participation of some 64 teams that were split in four groups. The three group winners advanced to the second stage as the final group of three, winner of which received promotion to the 1958 Class A. The fourth group winner (Russian Far East) were given a separate award by the Soviet Government.

The league's newcomer Avangard Leningrad won the championship.

Compared to the 1956 season, the competition expanded from 36 participants to 64 having two more groups added. Number of teams from the Russian SFSR increased substantially by adding the whole Russian Far East region to the tier.

== Teams ==
=== Relegated ===
- Trudovye Rezervy Leningrad
- SKVO Sverdlovsk

=== Promoted ===
- Russian SFSR (23): Avangard Leningrad (returned), Lokomotiv Saratov (returned), Khimik Yaroslavl (debut), Neftyanik Grozny (debut), Burevestnik Leningrad (debut), Trudoviye Rezervy Stavropol (debut), Pischevik Kaliningrad (debut), Avangard Sormovo (debut), Dinamo Kirov (debut), Lokomotiv Chelyabinsk (debut), Neftianik Ufa (debut), SKVO Khabarovsk (debut), Dinamo Vladivostok (debut), Burevestnik Tomsk (debut), Krasnaya Zvezda Omsk (returned), Energiya Irkutsk (debut), Lokomotiv Krasnoyarsk (returned), SKVO Chita (debut), Sibselmash Novosibirsk (debut), Lokomotiv Komsomolsk-na-Amure (debut), Metallurg Stalinsk (debut), Shakhter Kemerovo (returned), Urozhai Barnaul (debut)
- Ukrainian SSR (6): SKCF Sevastopol (returned), Trudovye Rezervy Voroshilovgrad (returned), Shakhtar Kadiyevka (returned), Kolhospnyk Poltava (debut), Avangard Mykolaiv (returned), Khimik Dniprodzerzhinsk (debut)
- Belarusian SSR: Urozhai Minsk (debut)
- Georgian SSR: Lokomotiv Kutaisi (debut)

=== Withdrew ===
- Krylya Sovetov Stupino
- Dinamo Vladivostok

== First stage ==
=== Zone I ===
Pos	Rep	Team	Pld	W	D	L	GF	GA	GD	Pts
1	RUS	Avangard Leningrad	34	21	10	3	63	25	+38	52
2	RUS	Torpedo Taganrog	34	18	10	6	61	28	+33	46
3	UKR	Avangard Kharkov	34	18	5	11	65	41	+24	41
4	RUS	Neftyanik Krasnodar	34	17	7	10	56	45	+11	41
5	RUS	Torpedo Rostov-na-Donu	34	16	8	10	69	47	+22	40
6	RUS	Krylya Sovetov Voronezh	34	15	9	10	54	40	+14	39
7	RUS	Krasnoye Znamya Ivanovo	34	13	13	8	45	34	+11	39
8	UKR	Metallurg Zaporozhye	34	14	11	9	41	34	+7	39
9	UKR	SKCF Sevastopol	34	15	5	14	72	49	+23	35
10	RUS	Torpedo Gorkiy	34	12	10	12	43	45	−2	34
11	RUS	Lokomotiv Saratov	34	13	8	13	40	43	−3	34
12	RUS	Torpedo Stalingrad	34	12	10	12	40	46	−6	34
13	RUS	Khimik Yaroslavl	34	8	10	16	46	50	−4	26
14	RUS	Neftyanik Grozny	34	11	4	19	47	70	−23	26
15	RUS	Burevestnik Leningrad	34	10	2	22	38	72	−34	22
16	UKR	Trudoviye Rezervy Voroshilovgrad	34	6	10	18	18	55	−37	22
17	UKR	Shakhtyor Kadiyevka	34	7	7	20	33	61	−28	21
18	RUS	Trudoviye Rezervy Stavropol	34	8	5	21	30	76	−46	21

=== Number of teams by republics ===
Number	Union republics	Team(s)
13	Russian SFSR	FC Avangard Leningrad, FC Torpedo Taganrog, FC Neftyanik Krasnodar, FC Torpedo Rostov-na-Donu, FC Krylya Sovetov Voronezh, FC Krasnoye Znamya Ivanovo, FC Torpedo Gorkiy, FC Lokomotiv Saratov, FC Torpedo Stalingrad, FC Khimik Yaroslavl, FC Neftyanik Grozny, FC Burevestnik Leningrad, FC Trudoviye Rezervy Stavropol
5	Ukrainian SSR	FC Avangard Kharkov, FC Metallurg Zaporozhye, SKCF Sevastopol, FC Trudoviye Rezervy Voroshilovgrad, FC Shakhter Kadievka

=== Zone II ===
Pos	Rep	Team	Pld	W	D	L	GF	GA	GD	Pts
1	UKR	Spartak Stanislav	34	23	6	5	66	27	+39	52
2	UKR	SKVO Lvov	34	21	6	7	51	32	+19	48
3	RUS	Trudoviye Rezervy Leningrad	34	21	5	8	68	32	+36	47
4	UKR	Metallurg Dnepropetrovsk	34	17	8	9	65	43	+22	42
5	UKR	Pishchevik Odessa	34	16	7	11	65	48	+17	39
6	EST	Dinamo Tallinn	34	14	11	9	52	44	+8	39
7	RUS	Krylya Sovetov Stupino	34	15	8	11	44	39	+5	38
8	UKR	SKVO Kiev	34	14	9	11	42	36	+6	37
9	RUS	Shakhtyor Stalinogorsk	34	15	7	12	53	47	+6	37
10	UKR	Spartak Uzhgorod	34	12	9	13	41	40	+1	33
11	LTU	Spartak Vilnius	34	13	6	15	37	42	−5	32
12	UKR	Kolhospnik Poltava	34	12	4	18	43	57	−14	28
13	UKR	Avangard Nikolayev	34	10	7	17	50	63	−13	27
14	RUS	Pishchevik Kaliningrad	34	9	9	16	35	57	−22	27
15	BLR	Urozhai Minsk	34	11	4	19	42	57	−15	26
16	UKR	Khimik Dneprodzerzhinsk	34	7	9	18	38	65	−27	23
17	RUS	Avangard Sormovo	34	6	10	18	29	51	−22	22
18	LVA	Daugava Riga	34	4	7	23	22	63	−41	15

=== Number of teams by republics ===
Number	Union republics	Team(s)
9	Ukrainian SSR	FC Spartak Stanislav, SKVO Lvov, FC Metallurg Dnepropetrovsk, FC Pischevik Odessa, SKVO Kiev, FC Spartak Uzhgorod, FC Kolgospnik Poltava, FC Avangard Nikolayev, FC Khimik Dneprodzerzhinsk
5	Russian SFSR	FC Trudoviye Rezervy Leningrad, FC Krylya Sovetov Stupino, FC Shakhter Stalinogorsk, FC Pischevik Kaliningrad, FC Avangard Sormovo
1	Estonian SSR	FC Dinamo Tallinn
1	Lithuanian SSR	FC Spartak Vilnius
1	Belarusian SSR	FC Urozhai Minsk
1	Latvian SSR	FC Daugava Riga

=== Zone III ===
Pos	Rep	Team	Pld	W	D	L	GF	GA	GD	Pts
1	GEO	SKVO Tbilisi	30	22	5	3	93	26	+67	49
2	ARM	Spartak Yerevan	30	21	6	3	73	22	+51	48
3	AZE	Neftyanik Baku	30	18	8	4	70	37	+33	44
4	RUS	SKVO Sverdlovsk	30	15	9	6	58	18	+40	39
5	RUS	Krylya Sovetov Molotov	30	15	9	6	46	18	+28	39
6	GEO	Lokomotiv Kutaisi	30	16	6	8	54	28	+26	38
7	KAZ	Kayrat Alma-Ata	30	16	5	9	49	37	+12	37
8	RUS	Avangard Sverdlovsk	30	13	5	12	44	39	+5	31
9	RUS	Dinamo Kirov	30	12	4	14	44	64	−20	28
10	UZB	Pahtakor Tashkent	30	9	6	15	36	39	−3	24
11	RUS	Lokomotiv Chelyabinsk	30	6	10	14	22	37	−15	22
12	RUS	Zenit Izhevsk	30	8	5	17	26	47	−21	21
13	TKM	Kolhozchi Ashkhabad	30	8	4	18	25	59	−34	20
14	KGZ	Spartak Frunze	30	7	3	20	34	76	−42	17
15	RUS	Neftyanik Ufa	30	6	5	19	17	64	−47	17
16	TJK	Urozhai Stalinabad (Note: Urozhai Stalinabad was called Kolhozchi.)	30	2	2	26	19	99	−80	6

=== Number of teams by republics ===
Number	Union republics	Team(s)
7	Russian SFSR	SKVO Sverdlovsk, FC Krylya Sovetov Molotov, FC Avangard Sverdlovsk, FC Dinamo Kirov, FC Lokomotiv Chelyabinsk, FC Zenit Izhevsk, FC Neftyanik Ufa
2	Georgian SSR	SKVO Tbilisi, FC Lokomotiv Kutaisi
1	Armenian SSR	FC Spartak Yerevan
1	Azerbaijan SSR	FC Neftyanik Baku
1	Kazakh SSR	FC Kairat Alma-Ata
1	Uzbek SSR	FC Pakhtakor Tashkent
1	Turkmen SSR	FC Kolkhozchi Ashkhabad
1	Kyrgyz SSR	FC Spartak Frunze
1	Tajik SSR	FC Urozhai Stalinabad

=== Zone [Russia] Far East ===
Pos	Rep	Team	Pld	W	D	L	GF	GA	GD	Pts
1		SKVO Khabarovsk	22	12	8	2	34	14	+20	32
2		Dinamo Vladivostok	22	12	6	4	39	25	+14	30
3		Burevestnik Tomsk	22	11	6	5	49	29	+20	28
4		Krasnaya Zvezda Omsk	22	10	6	6	45	26	+19	26
5		Energiya Irkutsk	22	7	10	5	36	34	+2	24
6		Lokomotiv Krasnoyarsk	22	10	4	8	38	41	−3	24
7		SKVO Chita	22	9	5	8	30	28	+2	23
8		SibSelMash Novosibirsk	22	7	3	12	26	46	−20	17
9		Lokomotiv Komsomolsk-na-Amure	22	5	6	11	32	41	−9	16
10		Metallurg Stalinsk	22	4	7	11	28	40	−12	15
11		Shakhtyor Kemerovo	22	6	3	13	37	60	−23	15
12		Urozhai Barnaul	22	5	4	13	30	40	−10	14

== Final stage ==
[Nov 17 – Dec 3, Tashkent] 

Pos	Rep	Team	Pld	W	D	L	GF	GA	GD	BP	Pts	Promotion
1	RUS	Avangard Leningrad	4	3	0	1	9	5	+4	0	6	Promoted
2	UKR	Spartak Stanislav	4	1	1	2	6	8	−2	1	4	
3	GEO	SKVO Tbilisi	4	1	1	2	4	6	−2	1	4	

Source: rsssf.com

== See also ==
- 1957 Soviet Class A
- 1957 Soviet Cup
