= 1959 Soviet Football Championship, Class B =

Class B
- Season: 1959
- Champions: Trud Voronezh (Group 1); Trudovye Rezervy Leningrad (Group 2); Spartak Yerevan (Group 3); Lokomotiv Vinnitsa (Group 4); Admiralteyets Leningrad (Group 5); Pamir Leninabad (Group 6); SKVO Sverdlovsk (Group 7)
- Promoted: Admiralteyets Leningrad (RSFSR); Avangard Kharkov (Ukraine); Belarus Minsk (Belarus); Daugava Riga (Latvia); Kalev Tallinn (Estonia); Spartak Vilnius (Lithuania); Spartak Yerevan (Armenia); Neftyanik Baku (Azerbaijan); Pakhtakor Tashkent (Uzbekistan); Kairat Alma-Ata (Kazakhstan)

The 1959 Soviet Football Championship, Class B (Russian: Чемпионат СССР по футболу 1959 (класс «Б»)) was the tenth season of the Soviet Class B football competitions since their establishment in 1950. It was also the nineteenth season of the Soviet second tier professional football competitions.

It involved participation of 101 "teams of masters" split in seven groups which were composed by regional principle to some extent. Compared with the previous season, the number of participants was increased by seven teams. The teams were distributed somewhat equally among the seven groups with three groups containing 15 teams and four groups - 14. The competition also included representation of all 15 union republics by at least one participant. In majority the season kicked off on April 18, 1959, with the Round 1 matches in five groups. Groups 5 and 7 started later.

Four out of seven groups were won by clubs from the Russian SFSR (Russian Federation), three others represented three other union republics. Initially all the winners were to qualify for the final tournament as in previous season, but it was scratched as it was decided to reorganize competitions. The 1960 Class A competitions (higher tier) were planned to be expanded from 12 to 22 teams (by 10 teams). Among the four Russian winners there was organized additional short single round-robin tournament to identify the ultimate Class B winner for the Russian SFSR.

Following this season, the Soviet Class B competitions were split based on regional principle in three main groups Russian SFSR, Ukrainian SSR and Union republics.

== Teams ==
Promoted to (14): Spartak Leningrad, Torpedo Vladimir, Trud Ryazan, Trud Tula, Spartak Nalchik, Arsenal Kiev, Avangard Zhitomir, Avangard Krivoi Rog, Avangard Ternopol, Shakhter Gorlovka, Lokomotiv Bendery, Lokomotiv Gomel, Lokomotiv Tbilisi, Tekstilschik Kirovobad

Relegated to (1): Admiralteyets Leningrad

Location of teams in the 1959 Soviet Football Championship, Class B (European part).
Location of teams in the 1959 Soviet Football Championship, Class B (Siberia and Far East).

== First stage ==
=== I Zone ===
| Pos | Rep | Team | Pld | W | D | L | GF | GA | GD | Pts |
|---|---|---|---|---|---|---|---|---|---|---|
| 1 | RUS | FC Trud Voronezh (Note: Trud Voronezh was called Krylya Sovetov.) | 28 | 20 | 6 | 2 | 57 | 16 | +41 | 46 |
| 2 | RUS | FC Dinamo Kirov | 28 | 14 | 11 | 3 | 47 | 17 | +30 | 39 |
| 3 | UKR | FC Avangard Nikolayev | 28 | 14 | 9 | 5 | 52 | 28 | +24 | 37 |
| 4 | UKR | FC Metallurg Dnepropetrovsk | 28 | 14 | 6 | 8 | 47 | 37 | +10 | 34 |
| 5 | RUS | FC Iskra Kazan | 28 | 12 | 9 | 7 | 36 | 27 | +9 | 33 |
| 6 | UKR | FC Metallurg Zaporozhye | 28 | 14 | 4 | 10 | 40 | 30 | +10 | 32 |
| 7 | RUS | FC Khimik Yaroslavl | 28 | 10 | 8 | 10 | 31 | 28 | +3 | 28 |
| 8 | RUS | FC Lokomotiv Saratov | 28 | 8 | 11 | 9 | 39 | 32 | +7 | 27 |
| 9 | RUS | FC Spartak Leningrad | 28 | 11 | 5 | 12 | 43 | 48 | −5 | 27 |
| 10 | UKR | FC Spartak Kherson | 28 | 5 | 14 | 9 | 31 | 35 | −4 | 24 |
| 11 | UKR | FC Khimik Dneprodzerzhinsk | 28 | 9 | 6 | 13 | 35 | 46 | −11 | 24 |
| 12 | RUS | FC Trudoviye Rezervy Lipetsk | 28 | 8 | 8 | 12 | 26 | 41 | −15 | 24 |
| 13 | RUS | FC Torpedo Vladimir | 28 | 6 | 9 | 13 | 26 | 36 | −10 | 21 |
| 14 | RUS | FC Trud Ryazan | 28 | 4 | 5 | 19 | 20 | 53 | −33 | 13 |
| 15 | MDA | FC Lokomotiv Bendery | 28 | 3 | 5 | 20 | 19 | 75 | −56 | 11 |

=== Number of teams by republics ===
| Number | Union republics | Team(s) |
|---|---|---|
| 9 | Russian SFSR | FC Trud Voronezh, FC Dinamo Kirov, FC Iskra Kazan, FC Khimik Yaroslavl, FC Lokomotiv Saratov, FC Spartak Leningrad, FC Trudovye Rezervy Lipetsk, FC Torpedo Vladimir, FC Trud Ryazan |
| 5 | Ukrainian SSR | FC Avangard Nikolaev, FC Metallurg Dnepropetrovsk, FC Metallurg Zaporozhye, FC Spartak Kherson, FC Khimik Dneprodzerzhinsk |
| 1 | Moldavian SSR | FC Lokomotiv Bendery |

=== II Zone ===
| Pos | Rep | Team | Pld | W | D | L | GF | GA | GD | Pts |
|---|---|---|---|---|---|---|---|---|---|---|
| 1 | RUS | FC Trudovye Rezervy Leningrad | 28 | 19 | 6 | 3 | 55 | 19 | +36 | 44 |
| 2 | RUS | FC Trud Glukhovo | 28 | 13 | 11 | 4 | 41 | 23 | +18 | 37 |
| 3 | UKR | Avanhard Kharkiv | 28 | 13 | 11 | 4 | 40 | 26 | +14 | 37 |
| 4 | UKR | Kolhospnyk Cherkasy | 28 | 14 | 8 | 6 | 36 | 24 | +12 | 36 |
| 5 | UKR | Arsenal Kyiv | 28 | 13 | 8 | 7 | 49 | 37 | +12 | 34 |
| 6 | UKR | Zirka Kirovohrad | 28 | 11 | 10 | 7 | 42 | 21 | +21 | 32 |
| 7 | BLR | FC Spartak Minsk | 28 | 13 | 5 | 10 | 33 | 28 | +5 | 31 |
| 8 | RUS | FC Shakhtyor Stalinogorsk (Note: Shakhtyor Stalinogorsk was called Trud.) | 28 | 9 | 11 | 8 | 24 | 23 | +1 | 29 |
| 9 | UKR | Avanhard Zhytomyr | 28 | 9 | 9 | 10 | 41 | 34 | +7 | 27 |
| 10 | RUS | FC Znamya Truda Orekhovo-Zuyevo | 28 | 9 | 8 | 11 | 33 | 39 | −6 | 26 |
| 11 | RUS | FC Trudovye Rezervy Kursk | 28 | 6 | 13 | 9 | 42 | 50 | −8 | 25 |
| 12 | UKR | Avanhard Kryvyi Rih | 28 | 7 | 5 | 16 | 24 | 51 | −27 | 19 |
| 13 | RUS | FC Trud Tula | 28 | 5 | 8 | 15 | 26 | 44 | −18 | 18 |
| 14 | UKR | Kolhospnyk Poltava | 28 | 6 | 6 | 16 | 23 | 46 | −23 | 18 |
| 15 | BLR | FC Lokomotiv Gomel | 28 | 0 | 7 | 21 | 17 | 61 | −44 | 7 |

=== Number of teams by republics ===
| Number | Union republics | Team(s) |
|---|---|---|
| 7 | Ukrainian SSR | FC Avangard Kharkov, FC Kolgospnik Cherkassy, FC Arsenal Kiev, FC Zirka Kirovograd, FC Avangard Zhitomir, FC Avangard Krivoi Rog, FC Kolgospnik Poltava |
| 6 | Russian SFSR | FC Trudovye Rezervy Leningrad, FC Trud Glukhovo, FC Shakhtyor Stalinogorsk, FC Znamya Truda Orekhovo-Zuyevo, FC Trudovye Rezervy Kursk, FC Trud Tula |
| 2 | Belarusian SSR | FC Spartak Minsk, FC Lokomotiv Gomel |

=== III Zone ===
| Pos | Rep | Team | Pld | W | D | L | GF | GA | GD | Pts |
|---|---|---|---|---|---|---|---|---|---|---|
| 1 | ARM | FC Spartak Yerevan | 26 | 16 | 9 | 1 | 41 | 18 | +23 | 41 |
| 2 | RUS | FC Terek Grozny | 26 | 14 | 7 | 5 | 35 | 23 | +12 | 35 |
| 3 | RUS | FC Torpedo Taganrog | 26 | 14 | 5 | 7 | 35 | 25 | +10 | 33 |
| 4 | ARM | FC Shirak Leninakan | 26 | 10 | 8 | 8 | 32 | 27 | +5 | 28 |
| 5 | RUS | FC Kuban Krasnodar | 26 | 10 | 8 | 8 | 35 | 32 | +3 | 28 |
| 6 | GEO | FC Torpedo Kutaisi (Note: Torpedo Kutaisi was called Lokomotiv.) | 26 | 11 | 6 | 9 | 36 | 34 | +2 | 28 |
| 7 | GEO | FC SKVO Tbilisi | 26 | 12 | 3 | 11 | 51 | 41 | +10 | 27 |
| 8 | RUS | FC RostSelMash Rostov-na-Donu | 26 | 10 | 5 | 11 | 46 | 38 | +8 | 25 |
| 9 | RUS | FC Spartak Stavropol | 26 | 9 | 5 | 12 | 30 | 35 | −5 | 23 |
| 10 | RUS | FC Spartak Nalchik | 26 | 8 | 6 | 12 | 30 | 40 | −10 | 22 |
| 11 | GEO | FC Lokomotiv Tbilisi | 26 | 8 | 5 | 13 | 39 | 45 | −6 | 21 |
| 12 | AZE | FC Neftyanik Baku | 26 | 7 | 6 | 13 | 25 | 38 | −13 | 20 |
| 13 | RUS | FC Temp Makhachkala | 26 | 5 | 7 | 14 | 20 | 38 | −18 | 17 |
| 14 | AZE | FC Textilshchik Kirovabad | 26 | 7 | 2 | 17 | 31 | 52 | −21 | 16 |

=== Number of teams by republics ===
| Number | Union republics | Team(s) |
|---|---|---|
| 7 | Russian SFSR | FC Terek Grozny, FC Torpedo Taganrog, FC Kuban Krasnodar, FC Rostselmash Rostov-na-Donu, FC Spartak Stavropol, FC Spartak Nalchik, FC Temp Makhachkala |
| 3 | Georgian SSR | FC Torpedo Kutaisi, SKVO Tbilisi, FC Lokomotiv Tbilisi |
| 2 | Armenian SSR | FC Spartak Yerevan, FC Shirak Leninakan |
| 2 | Azerbaijan SSR | FC Neftianik Baku, FC Tekstilschik Kirovobad |

=== IV Zone ===
| Pos | Rep | Team | Pld | W | D | L | GF | GA | GD | Pts |
|---|---|---|---|---|---|---|---|---|---|---|
| 1 | UKR | FC Lokomotiv Vinnitsa | 28 | 17 | 7 | 4 | 59 | 30 | +29 | 41 |
| 2 | RUS | FC Baltika Kaliningrad | 28 | 17 | 6 | 5 | 58 | 27 | +31 | 40 |
| 3 | UKR | SKVO Odessa | 28 | 16 | 4 | 8 | 41 | 26 | +15 | 36 |
| 4 | UKR | FC Chernomorets Odessa | 28 | 15 | 4 | 9 | 40 | 25 | +15 | 34 |
| 5 | LTU | Spartak Vilnius | 28 | 14 | 6 | 8 | 38 | 31 | +7 | 34 |
| 6 | UKR | SKVO Lvov | 28 | 14 | 5 | 9 | 48 | 27 | +21 | 33 |
| 7 | UKR | FC Spartak Uzhgorod | 28 | 12 | 5 | 11 | 34 | 34 | 0 | 29 |
| 8 | EST | Dinamo Tallinn | 28 | 11 | 6 | 11 | 37 | 35 | +2 | 28 |
| 9 | UKR | FC Kolhospnyk Rovno | 28 | 8 | 8 | 12 | 49 | 49 | 0 | 24 |
| 10 | UKR | SKCF Sevastopol | 28 | 9 | 5 | 14 | 31 | 46 | −15 | 23 |
| 11 | LVA | FC Daugava Riga | 28 | 7 | 7 | 14 | 32 | 44 | −12 | 21 |
| 12 | UKR | FC Avangard Simferopol | 28 | 6 | 9 | 13 | 20 | 38 | −18 | 21 |
| 13 | BLR | FC Urozhai Minsk | 28 | 7 | 6 | 15 | 25 | 46 | −21 | 20 |
| 14 | UKR | FC Spartak Stanislav | 28 | 7 | 4 | 17 | 26 | 53 | −27 | 18 |
| 15 | UKR | FC Avangard Ternopol | 28 | 6 | 6 | 16 | 23 | 50 | −27 | 18 |

=== Number of teams by republics ===
| Number | Union republics | Team(s) |
|---|---|---|
| 10 | Ukrainian SSR | FC Lokomotiv Vinnitsa, SKVO Odessa, FC Chernomorets Odessa, SKVO Lvov, FC Spartak Uzhgorod, FC Kolgospnik Rovno, SKCF Sevastopol, FC Avangard Simferopol, FC Spartak Stanislav, FC Avangard Ternopol |
| 1 | Russian SFSR | FC Baltika Kaliningrad |
| 1 | Lithuanian SSR | FC Spartak Vilnius |
| 1 | Estonian SSR | FC Dinamo Tallinn |
| 1 | Latvian SSR | FC Daugava Riga |
| 1 | Belarusian SSR | FC Urozhai Minsk |

=== V Zone ===
| Pos | Rep | Team | Pld | W | D | L | GF | GA | GD | Pts |
|---|---|---|---|---|---|---|---|---|---|---|
| 1 | RUS | FC Admiralteyets Leningrad | 26 | 13 | 10 | 3 | 53 | 27 | +26 | 36 |
| 2 | RUS | FC Volga Kalinin | 26 | 15 | 6 | 5 | 58 | 31 | +27 | 36 |
| 3 | RUS | FC Zenit Izhevsk | 26 | 14 | 6 | 6 | 48 | 33 | +15 | 34 |
| 4 | UKR | FC Trudoviye Rezervy Lugansk | 26 | 15 | 3 | 8 | 55 | 31 | +24 | 33 |
| 5 | UKR | FC Lokomotiv Stalino | 26 | 15 | 3 | 8 | 58 | 42 | +16 | 33 |
| 6 | UKR | FC Shakhtyor Kadiyevka | 26 | 10 | 8 | 8 | 29 | 28 | +1 | 28 |
| 7 | RUS | FC Traktor Stalingrad | 26 | 10 | 6 | 10 | 46 | 39 | +7 | 26 |
| 8 | RUS | FC Torpedo Gorkiy | 26 | 9 | 7 | 10 | 39 | 37 | +2 | 25 |
| 9 | RUS | FC Raketa Gorkiy | 26 | 7 | 8 | 11 | 33 | 39 | −6 | 22 |
| 10 | RUS | FC Spartak Ulyanovsk (Note: Spartak Ulyanovsk was called Dinamo.) | 26 | 9 | 3 | 14 | 36 | 53 | −17 | 21 |
| 11 | RUS | FC Textilshchik Ivanovo | 26 | 5 | 9 | 12 | 29 | 45 | −16 | 19 |
| 12 | UKR | FC Shakhtyor Gorlovka | 26 | 7 | 5 | 14 | 25 | 47 | −22 | 19 |
| 13 | RUS | FC Energiya Volzhskiy | 26 | 6 | 7 | 13 | 24 | 50 | −26 | 19 |
| 14 | RUS | FC Shakhtyor Shakhty | 26 | 5 | 3 | 18 | 29 | 60 | −31 | 13 |

==== Play-Off for 1st place ====
[in Rostov-na-Donu]

- Admiralteyets Leningrad 4-1 Volga Kalinin

=== Number of teams by republics ===
| Number | Union republics | Team(s) |
|---|---|---|
| 10 | Russian SFSR | FC Admiralteyets Leningrad, FC Volga Kalinin, FC Zenit Izhevsk, FC Traktor Stalingrad, FC Torpedo Gorkiy, FC Raketa Gorkiy, FC Spartak Ulyanovsk, FC Tekstilschik Ivanovo, FC Energia Volzhskiy, FC Shakhter Shakhty |
| 4 | Ukrainian SSR | FC Trudoviye Rezervy Lugansk, FC Lokomotiv Stalino, FC Shakhter Kadievka, FC Shakhter Gorlovka |

=== VI Zone ===
| Pos | Rep | Team | Pld | W | D | L | GF | GA | GD | Pts |
|---|---|---|---|---|---|---|---|---|---|---|
| 1 | TJK | FC Pamir Leninabad | 26 | 16 | 4 | 6 | 41 | 34 | +7 | 36 |
| 2 | RUS | FC Mashinostroitel Sverdlovsk | 26 | 13 | 6 | 7 | 51 | 29 | +22 | 32 |
| 3 | RUS | FC Metallurg Magnitogorsk | 26 | 15 | 2 | 9 | 46 | 31 | +15 | 32 |
| 4 | UZB | FC Pahtakor Tashkent | 26 | 13 | 6 | 7 | 40 | 33 | +7 | 32 |
| 5 | RUS | FC Zvezda Perm | 26 | 13 | 5 | 8 | 41 | 31 | +10 | 31 |
| 6 | KAZ | FC Kayrat Alma-Ata | 26 | 11 | 8 | 7 | 46 | 37 | +9 | 30 |
| 7 | UZB | FC Trudoviye Rezervy Tashkent | 26 | 11 | 7 | 8 | 33 | 28 | +5 | 29 |
| 8 | KGZ | FC Spartak Frunze | 26 | 8 | 10 | 8 | 36 | 36 | 0 | 26 |
| 9 | RUS | FC Metallurg Nizhniy Tagil | 26 | 9 | 6 | 11 | 44 | 36 | +8 | 24 |
| 10 | RUS | FC Lokomotiv Chelyabinsk | 26 | 7 | 6 | 13 | 34 | 40 | −6 | 20 |
| 11 | KAZ | FC Shakhtyor Karaganda | 26 | 8 | 4 | 14 | 36 | 49 | −13 | 20 |
| 12 | TKM | FC Kolhozchi Ashkhabad | 26 | 9 | 2 | 15 | 36 | 51 | −15 | 20 |
| 13 | RUS | FC Stroitel Ufa (Note: Stroitel Ufa was called Devon.) | 26 | 7 | 5 | 14 | 25 | 39 | −14 | 19 |
| 14 | TJK | FC Hosilot Stalinabad | 26 | 6 | 1 | 19 | 26 | 61 | −35 | 13 |

=== Number of teams by republics ===
| Number | Union republics | Team(s) |
|---|---|---|
| 6 | Russian SFSR | FC Mashinostroitel Sverdlovsk, FC Metallurg Magnitogorsk, FC Zvezda Perm, FC Metallurg Nizhniy Tagil, FC Lokomotiv Chelyabinsk, FC Stroitel Ufa |
| 2 | Tajik SSR | FC Pamir Leninabad, FC Khosilot Stalinabad |
| 2 | Uzbek SSR | FC Pakhtakor Tashkent, FC Trudoviye Rezervy Tashkent |
| 2 | Kazakh SSR | FC Kairat Alma-Ata, FC Shakhter Karaganda |
| 1 | Kyrgyz SSR | FC Spartak Frunze |
| 1 | Turkmen SSR | FC Kolkhozchi Ashkhabad |

=== VII Zone ===
[All teams are from Russian Federation] 

| Pos | Team | Pld | W | D | L | GF | GA | GD | Pts |
|---|---|---|---|---|---|---|---|---|---|
| 1 | FC SKVO Sverdlovsk | 26 | 17 | 5 | 4 | 64 | 24 | +40 | 39 |
| 2 | FC Lokomotiv Krasnoyarsk | 26 | 17 | 5 | 4 | 50 | 20 | +30 | 39 |
| 3 | FC SKVO Khabarovsk | 26 | 14 | 8 | 4 | 39 | 23 | +16 | 36 |
| 4 | FC Khimik Kemerovo | 26 | 14 | 5 | 7 | 56 | 38 | +18 | 33 |
| 5 | FC SibSelMash Novosibirsk | 26 | 12 | 6 | 8 | 47 | 37 | +10 | 30 |
| 6 | FC Irtysh Omsk | 26 | 11 | 5 | 10 | 35 | 44 | −9 | 27 |
| 7 | FC Metallurg Stalinsk | 26 | 10 | 6 | 10 | 33 | 35 | −2 | 26 |
| 8 | FC Urozhai Barnaul | 26 | 11 | 3 | 12 | 43 | 39 | +4 | 25 |
| 9 | FC SibElectroMotor Tomsk (Note: SibElectroMotor Tomsk was called Tomich.) | 26 | 9 | 6 | 11 | 41 | 50 | −9 | 24 |
| 10 | FC Lokomotiv Komsomolsk-na-Amure | 26 | 7 | 9 | 10 | 21 | 31 | −10 | 23 |
| 11 | FC Energiya Irkutsk | 26 | 8 | 6 | 12 | 30 | 34 | −4 | 22 |
| 12 | FC SKVO Chita | 26 | 6 | 3 | 17 | 22 | 52 | −30 | 15 |
| 13 | FC Lokomotiv Ulan-Ude | 26 | 5 | 4 | 17 | 23 | 52 | −29 | 14 |
| 14 | FC Luch Vladivostok | 26 | 5 | 1 | 20 | 25 | 50 | −25 | 11 |

==== Play-Off for 1st place ====
[in Rostov-na-Donu]

- SKVO Sverdlovsk 4-1 Lokomotiv Krasnoyarsk

== Promotion ==
=== RSFSR ===
One team was to be promoted so all four group winners contested it in short tournament.

[for Russian Federation]
[Nov 6–10, Grozny] 

| Pos | Team | Pld | W | D | L | GF | GA | GD | Pts |
|---|---|---|---|---|---|---|---|---|---|
| 1 | FC Admiralteyets Leningrad | 3 | 2 | 1 | 0 | 7 | 0 | +7 | 5 |
| 2 | FC Trudoviye Rezervy Leningrad | 3 | 2 | 0 | 1 | 5 | 5 | 0 | 4 |
| 3 | FC Trud Voronezh | 3 | 1 | 1 | 1 | 6 | 2 | +4 | 3 |
| 4 | FC SKVO Sverdlovsk | 3 | 0 | 0 | 3 | 1 | 12 | −11 | 0 |

Source: rsssf.com

=== Other union republics ===
Ukraine

- FC Avangard Kharkov was promoted ahead of a group winner Lokomotiv Vinnitsa.

Belarus

- There was formed new team Belarus based on better players from all Class B teams.

Estonia

- The new team Kalev Tallinn promoted ahead of Dinamo Tallinn.

Latvia

- Daugava Riga gained direct promotion.

Lithuania

- Spartak Vilnius gained direct promotion.

Armenia

- Spartak Yerevan gained direct promotion.

Azerbaijan

- Neftyanik Baku gained promotion as a better team of the 1959 Class B.

Uzbekistan

- Pakhtakor Tashkent gained promotion as a better team of the 1959 Class B.

Kazakhstan

- Kairat Alma-Ata gained promotion as a better team of the 1959 Class B.

== See also ==
- Soviet First League
