= FC Torpedo Kharkiv =

Torpedo
- Full name: FC Torpedo Kharkiv
- Founded: 1933; 93 years ago
- Dissolved: 1960s
- Ground: KhTZ Stadium

FC Torpedo Kharkiv (Ukrainian: «Торпедо» (Харків)) was a professional Ukrainian and Soviet football club. The club was based in Kharkiv, Ukraine.

== Brief history ==
The club was founded in 1933 as KhTZ (Kharkiv Tractor Factory, tractor as an agricultural equipment) and kept the name until 1936 when it changed to Traktor.

=== Stadium ===
The KhTZ Stadium was officially opened in 1933.

== Honours ==
Soviet Championship Group G

- Winners: 1936 (spring), 1936 (autumn)

Football Championship of the Ukrainian SSR

- Runner-up: 1959

Ukrainian Cup

- Winners: 1958

== League and cup history ==
Season	Div.	Pos.	Pl.	W	D	L	GS	GA	P	Domestic Cup	Europe	Notes
Traktorny zavod Kharkiv
1936	4th	1	4	3	1	0	9	3	11			spring half
1936	4th	1	5	3	1	1	9	6	12			fall half
Traktor Kharkiv
1937	3rd	5	9	4	1	4	17	12	18			
1950	Rep	8	18	4	6	8	23	31	14			Zone 3
1951	Rep	8										Zone 2
1952	Rep	5	22	10	6	6	46	29	26			Zone 2
Torpedo Kharkiv
1959	Rep	1	14	9	4	1	30	7	22			Zone 4, to semifinal group
1959	Rep	2	4	2	1	1	5	3	5			Semifinal Group 1, to finals
1959	Rep	2	3	2	0	1	6	4	4			Promoted
1960	2nd	19	36	6	13	17	36	55	25			Ukraine, Zone 2
1961	2nd	18	36	7	11	18	34	56	25			Ukraine, Zone 2
