= SKCF Sevastopol =

Soviet football team

SKCF Sevastopol (Russian: Спортивный Клуб Черноморского Флота, Ukrainian: Спортивний Клуб Чорноморського Флоту) was a Soviet football team from Sevastopol, Russian SFSR, later Ukrainian SSR. The club represented sports club of the Black Sea Fleet and originally was called as the Fleet Officers Club, DOF (Russian: Дом Офицеров Флота, ДОФ).

== History ==
The football team first appeared before the World War II in the 1939 Russian Cup (Russian SFSR) where they lost to Sudostroitel Sevastopol.

After the war the team was revived in 1949 and was active until 1971. In 1949–1952 it played in the Russian football championship among KFK. In 1953 due to the death of Joseph Stalin, almost all military-based sports organization were withdrawn from competitions including SKCF. In 1954 the Crimean Oblast was transferred from the Russian SFSR to the Ukrainian SSR and teams of SKCF started to play more often with Ukrainian teams.

In 1963 the club was relegated and played in an amateur competition. In 1964 to the Master competition was promoted another club from Sevastopol Chaika Sevastopol that played in the Class B for the next three seasons until also was relegated. In 1968 SKCF managed to return, but had a terrible season and was relegated again. After another poor performance at amateur level the club folded. Since 1971 the Fleet team active competition record is discontinued.

== Managers ==
- 1954 Aleksandr Kvasnikov
- 1955 Viktor Chistokhvalov
- 1957 Valentin Artemyev
- 1961 Georgiy Sudakov
- 1962 Aleksei Sokolov
- 1963–1964 Valentin Tugarin
- 1965 Vladimir Nikanorov
- 1967 Georgiy Sudakov
- 1968 Mikhail Yermolayev

== League and cup history (Soviet Union) ==
Season	Div.	Pos.	Pl.	W	D	L	GS	GA	P	Domestic Cup	Europe	Notes
1954	2nd Class B Gr. 3	9_{/12}	22	5	8	9	19	31	18	1/32 finals		
1955	2nd Class B Gr. 1	15_{/16}	30	7	6	17	25	61	20	Zone 3, 1/64 finals		Relegated
1956	3rd Championship of the Ukrainian SSR Gr. 6	1_{/8}	14	12	1	1	43	8	25			Final (4th), promoted
1957	2nd Class B Gr. 1	9_{/18}	34	15	5	14	72	49	35	Zone 1, final		
1958	2nd Class B Gr. 2	1_{/16}	30	16	9	5	52	23	41	Zone 2, 1/4 finals		Final (3rd)
1959	2nd Class B Gr. 4	10_{/15}	28	9	5	14	31	46	23			
1960	2nd Class B, Ukrainian SSR Gr. 2	6_{/19}	36	15	9	12	49	34	39	Zone 4, 1/2 finals		
1961	2nd Class B, Ukrainian SSR Gr. 2	8_{/19}	36	12	13	11	56	46	37	1/16 finals		
1962	2nd Class B, Ukrainian SSR Gr. 3	8_{/13}	24	7	9	8	29	27	23	Zone Ukrainian SSR, 1/8 finals		Final stage, Places 18–28 (24th); reorganization of competitions
1963	3rd Class B, Ukrainian SSR Gr. 2	12_{/20}	38	15	8	15	48	32	38	Zone 2 Ukrainian SSR, final		
1964	3rd Class B, Ukrainian SSR Gr. 3	4_{/16}	30	14	6	10	45	28	34	1/8 finals		Final stage, Places 7–12 (11th)
1965	3rd Class B, Ukrainian SSR Gr. 3	4_{/17}	32	15	8	9	54	34	38	Zone 3 Ukrainian SSR, 1/4 finals		Final stage, Places 7–12 (11th)
1966	3rd Class B, Ukrainian SSR Gr. 1	3_{/20}	38	18	12	8	57	34	48			Final stage, Places 5–6 (5th)
1967	3rd Class B, Ukrainian SSR Gr. 1	4_{/21}	40	19	10	11	41	33	48	Zone 1 Ukrainian SSR, 1/16 finals		Promoted
1968	2nd Class A Second Group SubGr. 2	21_{/21}	40	5	11	24	16	57	21	1/64 finals		Ukrainian Relegation Tournament (6th, relegated)
1969	3rd Class B, Ukrainian SSR Gr. 2	8_{/21}	40	12	17	11	33	28	41			Reorganization of competitions
1970	4th Class B, Ukrainian SSR Gr. 2	14_{/14}	26	6	7	13	21	34	19			Final stage, Places 15–27 (23rd); reorganization of competitions
