= Soviet Class B =

Association football league in the Soviet Union

- Founded: 1950
- Folded: 1970
- Country: Soviet Union
- Level on pyramid: Level 2 & 3 & 4
- Promotion to: Soviet Class A Second Group
- Relegation to: KFK competitions
- Last champions: Motor Vladimir; Terek Grozny; FC Kord Balakovo; Sakhalin Yuzhno-Sakhalinsk; Khimik Severodonetsk; Tsementnik Semipalatinsk; Zarafshon Nawoyi

The Soviet Football Championship, Class B (Russian: Чемпионат СССР по футболу (Класс Б), Soviet football championship (Class B)) was the second, third and for a season fourth highest division of Soviet football, below the Soviet Class A and then the Soviet Class A Second Group.

== Historical background ==
=== Creation ===
The league was formed in 1950 as the second tier of football competitions in the Soviet Union in place of the Second Group of the Soviet football championship (1949 Soviet First League). Before the start of the 1950 season, there was an idea to include representatives of all 15 union republics. On behalf of the Soviet Council of Ministers, the chairman of the Committee of Physical Culture and Sports Arkadiy Apollonov presented to Mikhail Suslov the season's draft which included 27 teams representing 15 union republics. "The team from the Karelo-Finnish SSR due to lack of trained personnel was not included in participation of the Soviet Union championship", explained Arkadiy Apollonov.

Suslov sent the presentation to Kalashnikov and Sushkov to learn more about the issue. Those two came up with an alternative draft which they presented Georgy Malenkov rather than Suslov.

=== Further development ===
In 1960 Class B was split by republican (regional) principle and there existed Class B of the Russian SFSR, Class B of Ukraine, Class B of Union republics, Class B of Kazakhstan, Class B of Central Asia. With the expansion of Soviet Class A in 1963, the Soviet Class B was downgraded to the third tier and in 1970 even further to the fourth tier. Before 1971 it was abolished.

== Winners ==
=== Second tier ===
Season	Winner		Runners-up	Third
1950	VMS Moscow		Torpedo Gorkiy	Spartakas Vilnius
1951	Kalinin		Dinamo Minsk	Lokomotiv Moscow
1952	Kharkiv	Spartakas Vilnius	FC Lokomotyv Kharkiv	FC VMS Moscow
1952	Ivanovo	DO Tbilisi	FC Krasnoe Znamya Ivanovo	FC Dinamo Alma-Ata
1952	Baku	Neftçi PFK	FC Burevestnik Chișinău	FC Torpedo Gorky
1952	Final	Lokomotyv Kharkiv	Spartakas Vilnius	DO Tbilisi
1953	Zone 1	FC Spartaki Tbilisi	FC Dynamo Yerevan	FC Torpedo Rostov-on-Don
1953	Zone 2	FC Znamya Ivanovo	FC Dinamo Minsk	FC Metalurh Odessa
1953	Zone 3	FC Shakhtar Stalino	FC Torpedo Gorky	FC Metalurh Zaporizhia
1953	Final	Dinamo Minsk	Torpedo Gorkiy	Shakhtar Stalino
1954	Zone 1	FC Spartak Yerevan	Neftçi PFK	ODO Tbilisi
1954	Zone 2	FC Zenit Moscow	Spartakas Vilnius	FC Khimik Moscow
1954	Zone 3	FC Shakhtar Stalino	FC Torpedo Rostov-on-Don	FC Metalurh Zaporizhia
1954	Final	Shakhtar Stalino	Spartakas Vilnius	Neftchi Baku
1955	Zone 1	Burevestnik Chisinau	Spartak Kalinin	ODO Kiev
1955	Zone 2	ODO Sverdlovsk	Spartak Yerevan	ODO Tbilisi
1956	Zone 1	Spartak Minsk	Torpedo Taganrog	Metalurh Zaporizhia
1956	Zone 2	Krylya Sovetov Kuybyshev	ODO Tbilisi	Spartak Yerevan
1957	Zone 1	FC Avangard Leningrad	FC Torpedo Taganrog	FC Avanhard Kharkiv
1957	Zone 2	FC Spartak Stanislav	SKVO Lviv	FC Trudovyie Rezervy Leningrad
1957	Zone 3	SKVO Tbilisi	FC Spartak Yerevan	Neftçi PFK
1957	Far East	SKVO Khabarovsk	FC Dynamo Vladivostok	FC Burevestnik Tomsk
1957	Final	Avangard Leningrad	Spartak Stanislav	SKVO Tbilisi
1958	Zone 1	SKVO Odessa	FC Trudovyie Rezervy Leningrad	FC Avanhard Mykolaiv
1958	Zone 2	SKCF Sevastopol	FC Metalurh Zaporizhia	FC Rostselmash Rostov-on-Don
1958	Zone 3	SKVO Lviv	Spartak Minsk	FC Lokomotyv Vinnytsia
1958	Zone 4	SKVO Rostov-on-Don	FC Spartak Yerevan	FC Kuban Krasnodar
1958	Zone 5	SKVO Sverdlovsk	FC Kairat Alma-Ata	FC Zvezda Perm
1958	Zone 6	SKVO Khabarovsk	FC Tomich Tomsk	FC Urozhai Barnaul
1958	Final	SKVO Rostov-na-Donu	SKVO Sverdlovsk	SKCF Sevastopol
1959	Zone 1	FC Trud Voronezh	FC Dynamo Kirov	FC Avanhard Mykolaiv
1959	Zone 2	FC Trudovyie Rezervy Leningrad	FC Trud Glukhovo	FC Avanhard Kharkiv
1959	Zone 3	FC Spartak Yerevan	FC Terek Grozny	FC Torpedo Taganrog
1959	Zone 4	FC Lokomotyv Vinnytsia	FC Baltika Kaliningrad	SKVO Odessa
1959	Zone 5	FC Admiralteyets Leningrad	FC Volga Kalinin	FC Zenit Izhevsk
1959	Zone 6	FC Pamir Leninabad	FC Mashinostroitel Sverdlovsk	FC Metallurg Magnitogorsk
1959	Zone 7	SKVO Sverdlovsk	FC Lokomotiv Krasnoyarsk	SKVO Khabarovsk
1959	Russia Final	Admiralteyets Leningrad	Trudovyie Reservy Leningrad (Note: Trudovye Reservy replaced Dynamo Leningrad for several seasons. Later, Dynamo was reinstated in their place.)	Trud Voronezh
1960	Russia I	FC Trud Voronezh	FC Spartak Leningrad	FC Shakhter Stalinogorsk
1960	Russia II	FC Volga Kalinin	FC Shinnik Yaroslavl	FC Dynamo Kirov
1960	Russia III	FC Terek Grozny	FC Torpedo Taganrog	FC Spartak Krasnodar
1960	Russia IV	FC Metallurg Nizhny Tagil	FC Zvezda Perm	FC Lokomotiv Chelyabinsk
1960	Russia V	FC Irtysh Omsk	SKA Khabarovsk	FC Sibelektromotor Tomsk
1960	Russia Final	Trud Voronezh	FC Irtysh Omsk	Volga Kalinin
1960	Ukraine I	Sudnobudivnyk Mykolaiv	FC Lokomotyv Vinnytsia	FC Arsenal Kyiv
1960	Ukraine II	FC Metalurh Zaporizhia	SKA Odessa	FC Trudovi Rezervy Luhansk
1960	Ukraine Final	Metalurh Zaporizhzhya	Sudobudivnyk Mykolaiv	
1960	Republics I	FC Lokomotivi Tbilisi	FC Urozhai Minsk	FC Shirak Leninakan
1960	Republics II	FC Torpedo Kutaisi	FC Pamir Leninabad	FC Progress Baku
1960	Republics Final	Torpedo Kutaisi	Lokomotivi Tbilisi	
1961	Russia I	FC Volga Kalinin	FC Metallurg Cherepovets	FC Dynamo Leningrad
1961	Russia II	FC Dynamo Kirov	FC Baltika Kaliningrad	FC Iskra Kazan
1961	Russia III	FC Krylia Sovietov Kuibyshev	FC Sokol Saratov	FC Traktor Stalingrad
1961	Russia IV	FC Terek Grozny	FC Rostselmash Rostov-on-Don	FC Torpedo Taganrog
1961	Russia V	FC Lokomotiv Chelyabinsk	FC Uralmash Sverdlovsk	FC Stroitel Ufa
1961	Russia VI	SKA Khabarovsk	SKA Novosibirsk	FC Luch Vladivostok
1961	Russia Final	Krylya Sovetov Kuybyshev	Terek Grozny	Dynamo Kirov
1961	Ukraine I	FC Chornomorets Odessa	FC Lokomotyv Vinnytsia	FC Zirka Kirovohrad
1961	Ukraine II	SKA Odessa	FC Trudovi Rezervy Luhansk	FC Avanhard Zhovti Vody
1961	Ukraine Final	Chornomorets Odessa	SCA Odessa	Lokomotyv Vinnytsia
1961	Republics I	FC Lokomotivi Tbilisi	FC Shirak Leninakan	Lokomotiv Gomel
1961	Republics II	FC Torpedo Kutaisi	FC Shakhter Karaganda	FC Metallurg Rustavi
1962	Russia I	FC Shinnik Yaroslavl	FC Spartak Leningrad	FC Tekstilshchik Ivanovo
1962	Russia II	FC Trud Voronezh	FC Trudovyie Rezervy Kursk	FC Serpukhov
1962	Russia III	FC Spartak Krasnodar	FC Traktor Volgograd	FC Rostselmash Rostov-on-Don
1962	Russia IV	FC Uralmash Sverdlovsk	FC Lokomotiv Chelyabinsk	FC Iskra Kazan
1962	Russia V	SKA Novosibirsk	SKA Khabarovsk	FC Luch Vladivostok
1962	Russia Final	Spartak Krasnodar	Trud Voronezh	Uralmash Sverdlovsk
1962	Ukraine I	FC Chornomorets Odessa	FC Polissya Zhytomyr	FC Lokomotyv Donetsk
1962	Ukraine II	SKA Odessa	FC Metalurh Zaporizhia	SKA Kyiv
1962	Ukraine III	FC Trudovi Rezervy Luhansk	Avanhard Simferopol	FC Lokomotyv Vinnytsia
1962	Ukraine Final	Trudovye Rezervy Lugansk	Chornomorets Odessa	Avanhard Simferopol
1962	Republics I	Lokomotiv Gomel	FC Shirak Leninakan	FC Nairi Yerevan
1962	Republics II	FC Shakhter Karaganda	FC Alga Frunze	FC Metallurg Chimkent
1962	Republics Final	Shakhtyor Karaganda	Lokomotiv Gomel	

=== Third tier ===
Season	Zone	Winner	Runners-up	Third	Notes
1963	Russia	Volga Kalinin	Dinamo Kirov	Zvezda Serpukhov	three zones
1963	Ukraine	SKA Odessa	Lokomotyv Vinnytsia	Azovstal Zhdanov	three zones
1963	Republics	Lokomotivi Tbilisi	Dinamo Batumi		three zones
1964	Russia	Rostselmash Rostov/Don	Terek Grozny	Tekstilshchik Ivanovo	three zones
1964	Ukraine	Lokomotyv Vinnytsia	SKA Kiev	Polissya Zhytomyr	three zones
1964	Republics	Granitas Klaipėda	Vostok Ust-Kamenogorsk	Politodel Tashkent Oblast	three zones
1965	Russia	Spartak Nalchik	Rubin Kazan	Sokol Saratov	three zones
1965	Ukraine	SKA Lviv	SKA Kiev	Avanhard Zhovti Vody	three zones
1965	Republics	Dynamo Kirovobad	Dynamo Baku	Pamir Leninabad	three zones
1966	Russia	Lokomotiv Kaluga	Spartak Ordzhonikidze	Metallurg Tula	four zones
1966	Ukraine	Avanhard Zhovti Vody	Dynamo Khmelnytskyi	Lokomotyv Kherson	four zones
1966	Central Asia	Pamir Leninabad	Metallurg Chimkent	Dynamo Tselinograd	four zones
1966	Republics	Meshakhte Tkibuli	Polad Sumgayit	Neman Grodno	four zones
1967	Russia	Dinamo Makhachkala	Volga Ulyanovsk	Volgar Astrakhan	four zones
1967	Ukraine	Avtomobilist Zhytomyr	Khimik Severodonetsk	Dnipro Kremenchuk	four zones
1967	Central Asia	Zarafshon Nawoyi	Sverdlovets Tashkent Oblast	Metallurg Temirtau	four zones
1967	Republics	Neman Grodno	Polad Sumgait		four zones
1968	Russia	Mashuk Pyatigorsk	Kalinenets Sverdlovsk	Spartak Belgorod	four zones
1968	Ukraine	Avanhard Ternopil	Bukovyna Chernivtsi	Shakhtar Kadiivka	four zones
1968	Central Asia	Sverdlovets Tashkent Oblast	Ak Altyn Andizhan Oblast	Samarqand	four zones
1968	Kazakhstan	Embek Djezkazghan	ADK Alma‑Ata	Metallurg Temirtau	four zones
1969	Russia	Druzhba Maykop	Saturn Rybinsk	Iskra Smolensk	five zones
1969	Ukraine	Spartak Ivano-Frankivsk	Shakhtar Horlivka	Spartak Sumy	five zones
1969	Central Asia	Tashavtomash Tashkent	Samarkand	Yangiyer	five zones
1969	Kazakhstan	Traktor Pavlodar	Tsementnik Semipalatinsk	Embek Djezkazghan	five zones
1969	Caucasus	Dila Gori	Guria Lanchkhuti	Avtomobilist Yerevan	five zones

=== Fourth tier ===
Season	Winner	Runners-up	Notes
1970	Motor Vladimir (Russia); Terek Grozny (Russia); FC Kord Balakovo (Russia); Sakhalin Yuzhno-Sakhalinsk (Russia); Khimik Severodonetsk (Ukraine); Tsementnik Semipalatinsk (Kazakhstan); Zarafshon Nawoyi (Central Asia)	Spartak Kostroma (Russia); FC Spartak Ryazan (Russia); Neftianik Tumen (Russia); Vulkan Petropavlovsk‑Kamtchatski (Russia); Lokomotyv Vinnytsia (Ukraine); Traktor Pavlodar (Kazakhstan); Janguier (Central Asia)	seven zones, four in RSFSR
