= FC Khimik Sievierodonetsk =

Khimik Sievierodonetsk
- Full name: FC Khimik Sievierodonetsk
- Founded: 1952; 73 years ago
- Dissolved: 1998; 27 years ago
- Ground: Khimik Stadium
- League: defunct

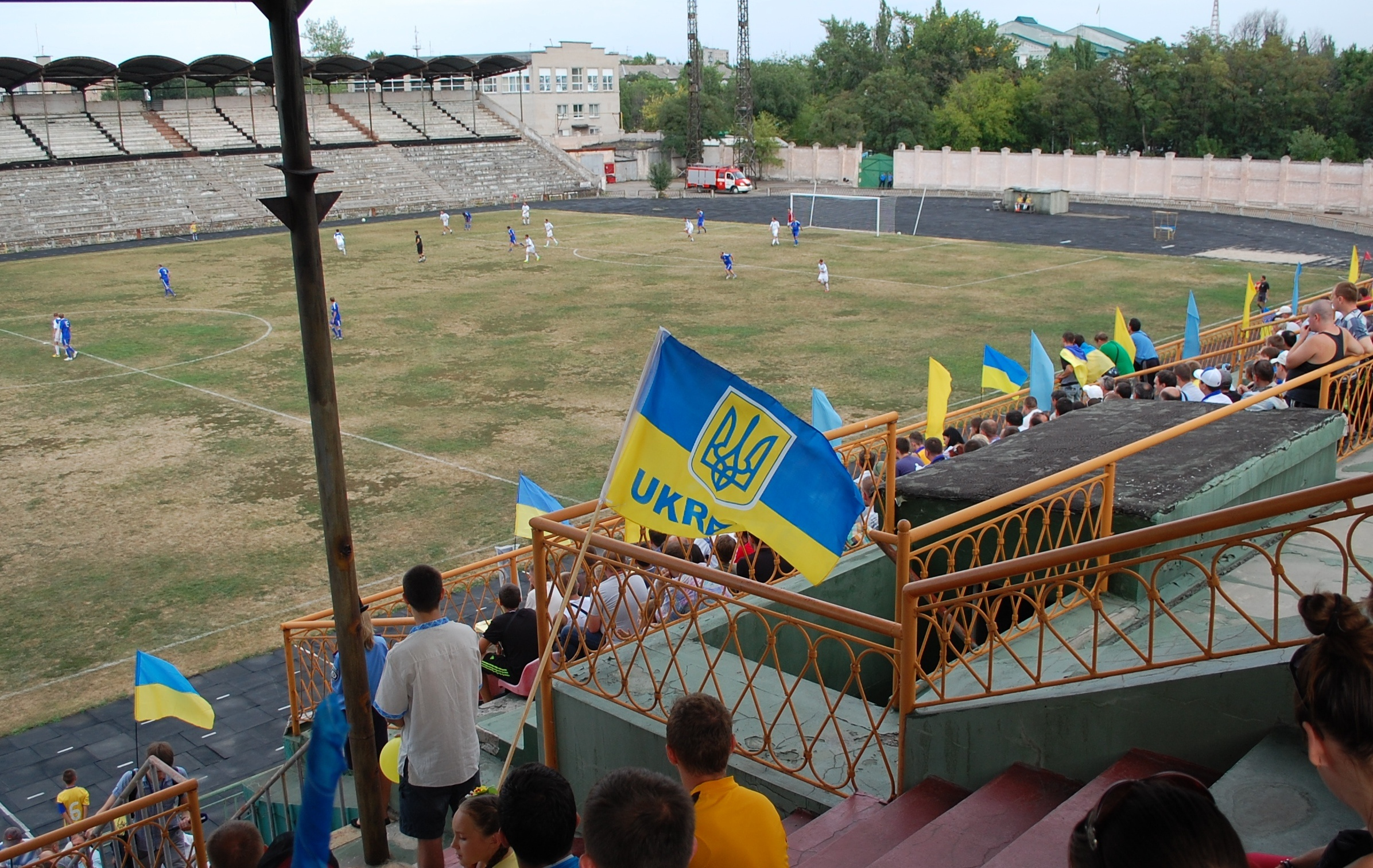
Khimik Stadium (August 2014)

FC Khimik Sievierodonetsk (Ukrainian: Хімік (Сєвєродонецьк)) was a professional Ukrainian football club. The club was based in Sievierodonetsk, Ukraine.

== Brief history ==
In Soviet times the club participated on the professional level from 1963 when the Ukrainian zone of the Soviet Second League was organized and until 1970 during another reorganization of the Soviet football structure. The "team of masters" was representing local Azot chemical plant. Later, in 1991 it reentered the professional competition once again right before the dissolution of Soviet Union. In the Ukrainian soccer competitions as well as in the Soviet, the club was called Khimik (chemical scientist). The club for several season was showing good results and was one of the contenders to be promoted to the Ukrainian Premier League, but in 1998 it became defunct. Among notable achievements was elimination of FC Shakhtar Donetsk during the 1992–93 Ukrainian Cup.

In 2005–08, there was another club from Sievierodonetsk called Blyskavka (Thunder-bolt) that competed on the amateur level.

=== Stadium ===
The Khimik Stadium was officially opened on International Labor Day, 1 May 1951. To celebrate the event, there took place a friendly game between Khimik Severodonetsk and Metalurh Debaltseve which was won by Metalurh 7:0. Later in autumn that year, Khimik revenged its loss beating Metalurh 1:0. Constriction of the stadium started in autumn 1950 on efforts of Petro Novikov.
