= FC Frunzenets-Liha-99 Sumy =

- Full name: FC Frunzenets-Liha-99 Sumy
- Founded: 1960
- Dissolved: 2002
- Ground: Yuvileiny Stadium, Sumy
- Capacity: 25,830
- League: Druha Liha
- 2001–02: 5th

FC Frunzenets-Liha-99 Sumy was a football club based in a city of Sumy in Ukraine. The club represented a mechanical engineering factory of the Frunze Science and Production Association in Sumy.

== History ==
The club was founded in 1960 as FC Avanhard Sumy. That used to be a common name of all newly founded football clubs in Ukraine at that time. From 1963 to 1971 the club carried the name of Spartak. In the beginning of the 21st century in Sumy there was a different team under the same name. In 70's the team had a name of Frunzenets. Since 1984 and until 2000 the team plays on the amateur level in the Oblast championship. The club reenter the Druha Liha in 2000 as FC Frunzrenets-Liha-99 Sumy, but in 2002 it merged FC Sumy which earned the promotion to the First League. In 1996 entered the competition of the national cup tournament.

== Previous names of the club ==
- 1960–1962 – Football Club Avanhard Sumy (Ukrainian: Футбольний Клуб "Авангард" Суми)
- 1963–1971 – Football Club Spartak Sumy (Ukrainian: Футбольний Клуб "Спартак" Суми)
- 1972–1989 – Football Club Frunzenets Sumy (Ukrainian: Футбольний Клуб "Фрунзенець" Суми)
- 1999–2002 – Football Club Frunzenets-Liha-99 Sumy (Ukrainian: Футбольний Клуб "Фрунзенець-Ліга-99" Суми)

== See also ==
- FC Spartak Sumy
- FC Yavir Krasnopilya
- FC Avtomobilist Sumy
