= SC Prometei Dniprodzerzhynsk =

Soviet football club

SC Prometei Dniprodzerzhynsk was a Soviet football club from Dniprodzerzhynsk, Dnipropetrovsk Oblast. The club was founded in 1947 and participated in the Soviet competition until 1970.

== History ==
The club was founded in 1947 as Traktor Dniprodzerzhynsk under the patronage of a secretive Soviet Factory of Slag Fertilizers, a part of the Soviet Defense Industry Complex. The club entered regional competitions of Dnipropetrovsk Oblast in 1951. In 1952 Traktor entered the republican stage and after being promoted to upper league changed its name to Khimik. From 1957 to 1970 the club competed in the Soviet Class B championship (analogous with a third level of league system). In 1962 Khimik changed its name to Dnieprovets and in 1967 - to Prometei. In 1970 the extra funding for the club from the city authorities ended and the club withdrew from the professional ranks. Being sponsored by the factory only (by then renamed as Trans-Dnieper Chemical Plant), the club continued to play in the city championship and only rarely participated in the regional competitions.

In 2007, the Trans-Dnieper Chemical Plant was officially announced bankrupt.

== League and Cup history ==
Season	Div.	Pos.	Pl.	W	D	L	GS	GA	P	Domestic Cup	Europe	Notes

== See also ==
- FC Prometei Dniprodzerzhynsk
- FC Stal Kamianske
