= FC Lokomotyv Donetsk =

Soviet football club

FC Lokomotyv Donetsk (Ukrainian: Локомотив Донецьк) was a football club from Donetsk.

== History ==
The club was created sometime around 1957 and initially represented city of Artemivsk (today Bakhmut). After being promoted to the Soviet Class B in 1958, the club moved to Stalino (Donetsk) in mid-season where it played at a newly built Lokomotyv Stadium (today known as RSC Olimpiyskiy). The club existed until 1973 when it relegated from the Soviet Second League and was dissolved.
