= List of Ukrainian football champions =

Ukrainian football championship
- Founded: 1921 (as the Football champion of the UkrSSR)
- Country: Ukraine
- Confederation: UEFA
- Level on pyramid: Ukrainian football league system
- Current champions: Shakhtar Donetsk (2025–26)

The Ukrainian football champions (Ukrainian: Чемпіон України з футболу) are currently identified as the annual football competition of the Ukrainian Premier League which has been a top league football competition in the country since 2008.

The history of the title could be traced to 1921 in varying forms of competition as full-fledged nationwide competitions within the Ukrainian SSR (before it officially joined the Soviet Union).

Dynamo Kyiv has won a record 29 championship titles including 13 Soviet Union titles.

== Historical outlook ==
The first national (or rather republican) Ukrainian football championship took place in 1921, just before the official establishment of the Soviet Union. The competition was known as the football championship of cities. It has developed out of a similar tournament that previously took place in the Russian Empire (1912). The detailed information about football competitions in 1920s and early 1930s is scarce. Remarkable is the fact that the dominant team (or teams) of that period was from Kharkiv which until 1934 was the capital of the Soviet pseudo state, (Note: Ukrainian SSR was not recognized until 1945.) Ukrainian SSR. During that time the main cities of Ukraine were conducting own annual competitions among which were Kyiv, Kharkiv, Odesa, at the same time in the east Ukraine existed a separate regional competition of Donets basin (Donbas). Winners of those regional competitions qualified for the football championship of cities, hence the name of the tournament.

Football in the West Ukraine has developed as part of the Central European football competitions that later sprang out of the dissolution of Austria-Hungary. Interrupted by the World War I, later it was completely abolished after the Polish occupation of Ukraine at the end of Polish-Ukrainian War. After Polish occupation Ukrainian clubs of West Ukraine that at first were conducting own competitions eventually joined the Polish Football Association among which are Ukraina Lwow, USC Skala Stryi and several others.

In 1936 there was established the Soviet professional football competitions, while the Ukrainian football competitions were integrated within the Soviet competition as republican and declassed to lower tiers. At the same time about three to six of the best clubs from the Soviet Ukraine competed in the Soviet Top League with Dynamo Kyiv competing in it consistently since its establishment. At same time until 1950s the Ukrainian Cup (Cup of the Ukrainian SSR) involved participation of all Ukrainian clubs regardless in which league they competed.

In 1959 a big reform occurred in the Soviet football and champion of Ukrainian football competitions was identified at the Class B football competitions for Ukraine which at first was the second and later the third tier. The Ukrainian football champions of the Soviet Union were not only unknown outside of the Soviet Union, but were also barely recognized within the Union. Nonetheless, over the span of years the Ukrainian club football was very competitive. FC Dynamo Kyiv won the record number of the Soviet top league titles and was the best Soviet club at the European club competitions. In 1991 Soviet Top League there was equal number of Ukrainian and Russian clubs in the league.

Finally after securing its independence in 1992, Ukraine conducts own national league competitions which are recognized worldwide.

== List of winners before club competitions ==
Season	Group	Champion	Runner-up	Third place
1921		Kharkiv	Odesa	?
1922		Kharkiv	Odesa	?
1923		Kharkiv	Yuzivka	?
1924		Kharkiv	Odesa	Donbas
1927		Kharkiv	Mykolaiv	Odesa
1928		Kharkiv	Horlivka	Mykolaiv
1931		Kyiv	Kharkiv	?
1932		Kharkiv	Donbas	Dnipropetrovsk
1934		Kharkiv	Kyiv	
1935		Dnipropetrovsk	Kyiv	Kharkiv

== Football competitions among Soviet clubs and Soviet sports societies ==
=== Best Ukrainian clubs in all-Union competitions ===
List of the best Ukrainian clubs in the top Soviet competitions

- † — Soviet tier 1
- ‡ — Soviet tier 2
- (no sign) — Soviet tier 3

Season	Best	2nd Best	3rd Best
1936 (spring)	Dynamo Kyiv	FC Dynamo Dnipropetrovsk	FC Dynamo Kharkiv
1936 (fall)	Dynamo Kyiv	FC Silmash Kharkiv	Spartak Kharkiv
1937	Dynamo Kyiv	FC Chornomorets Odesa	FC Lokomotyv Kyiv / Stakhanovets
1938	Dynamo Kyiv	Dynamo Odesa	Stakhanovets Stalino
1939	Dynamo Kyiv	Stakhanovets Stalino	Dynamo Odesa
1940	Dynamo Kyiv	Stakhanovets Stalino	FC Dynamo Kharkiv
1941-45	no competitions World War II		
1945	Dynamo Kyiv	Stakhanovets Stalino	Pishchevik Odesa
1946	Dynamo Kyiv	FC Lokomotyv Kharkiv	Pishchevik Odesa
1947	Dynamo Kyiv	FC Lokomotyv Kharkiv	Shakhtar Stalino
1948	Dynamo Kyiv	FC Lokomotyv Kharkiv	Stal Dnipropetrovsk
1949	Dynamo Kyiv	FC Lokomotyv Kharkiv	Shakhtar Stalino
1950	Shakhtar Stalino	Dynamo Kyiv	FC Lokomotyv Kharkiv
1951	Shakhtar Stalino	Dynamo Kyiv	FC Lokomotyv Kharkiv
1952	Dynamo Kyiv	Shakhtar Stalino	FC Lokomotyv Kharkiv
1953	Dynamo Kyiv	FC Lokomotyv Kharkiv	Shakhtar Stalino
1954	Dynamo Kyiv	FC Lokomotyv Kharkiv	Shakhtar Stalino
1955	Dynamo Kyiv	Shakhtar Stalino	ODO Kyiv
1956	Dynamo Kyiv	Shakhtar Stalino	FC Metalurh Zaporizhia
1957	Dynamo Kyiv	Shakhtar Stalino	Spartak Stanislav
1958	Dynamo Kyiv	Shakhtar Stalino	SKVO Odesa SKCF Sevastopol SKA Lviv
1959	Dynamo Kyiv	Shakhtar Stalino	FC Nyva Vinnytsia
1960	Dynamo Kyiv	Avangard Kharkiv	Shakhtar Stalino
1961	Dynamo Kyiv	Avangard Kharkiv	Shakhtar Stalino
1962	Dynamo Kyiv	FC Shakhtar Donetsk	Avangard Kharkiv
1963	Dynamo Kyiv	FC Shakhtar Donetsk	Avangard Kharkiv
1964	FC Shakhtar Donetsk	Dynamo Kyiv	SKA Odesa
1965	Dynamo Kyiv	FC Shakhtar Donetsk	FC Chornomorets Odesa
1966	Dynamo Kyiv	FC Shakhtar Donetsk	FC Chornomorets Odesa
1967	Dynamo Kyiv	FC Shakhtar Donetsk	FC Zorya Luhansk
1968	Dynamo Kyiv	FC Chornomorets Odesa	FC Zorya Luhansk
1969	Dynamo Kyiv	FC Chornomorets Odesa	FC Shakhtar Donetsk
1970	FC Zorya Luhansk	Dynamo Kyiv	FC Shakhtar Donetsk
1971	Dynamo Kyiv	FC Zorya Luhansk	FC Karpaty Lviv
1972	FC Zorya Luhansk	Dynamo Kyiv	FC Dnipro
1973	Dynamo Kyiv	FC Shakhtar Donetsk	FC Zorya Luhansk
1974	Dynamo Kyiv	FC Chornomorets Odesa	FC Dnipro
1975	Dynamo Kyiv	FC Shakhtar Donetsk	FC Karpaty Lviv
1976 (spring)	FC Karpaty Lviv	FC Shakhtar Donetsk	Dynamo Kyiv
1976 (fall)	Dynamo Kyiv	FC Karpaty Lviv	FC Chornomorets Odesa
1977	Dynamo Kyiv	FC Shakhtar Donetsk	FC Chornomorets Odesa
1978	Dynamo Kyiv	FC Shakhtar Donetsk	FC Chornomorets Odesa
1979	FC Shakhtar Donetsk	Dynamo Kyiv	FC Chornomorets Odesa
1980	Dynamo Kyiv	FC Shakhtar Donetsk	FC Chornomorets Odesa
1981	Dynamo Kyiv	FC Shakhtar Donetsk	FC Dnipro
1982	Dynamo Kyiv	FC Dnipro	FC Chornomorets Odesa
1983	FC Dnipro	Dynamo Kyiv	FC Chornomorets Odesa
1984	FC Dnipro	FC Chornomorets Odesa	Dynamo Kyiv
1985	Dynamo Kyiv	FC Dnipro	FC Metalist Kharkiv
1986	Dynamo Kyiv	FC Shakhtar Donetsk	FC Dnipro
1987	FC Dnipro	Dynamo Kyiv	FC Shakhtar Donetsk
1988	FC Dnipro	Dynamo Kyiv	FC Shakhtar Donetsk
1989	FC Dnipro	Dynamo Kyiv	FC Chornomorets Odesa
1990	Dynamo Kyiv	FC Dnipro	FC Shakhtar Donetsk
1991	FC Chornomorets Odesa	Dynamo Kyiv	FC Dnipro

=== List of winners of Ukrainian republican football competitions ===
Season	Group	Champion	Runner-up	Third place
1936		Ordzhonikidze Factory Kramatorsk	Stal Dnipropetrovsk	UDKA Kyiv
1937		Spartak Dnipropetrovsk	Zenit Staline	Stalinets Kharkiv
1938		Dzerzhynets Voroshylovhrad	Stal Dniprodzerzhynsk	Dynamo Mykolaiv
1939		Lokomotyv Zaporizhia	Kharchovyk Odesa	Lokomotyv Kharkiv
1940		Lokomotyv Zaporizhia	Stakhanovets Ordzhonikidze	Avanhard Kramatorsk
1941-45	no competitions World War II			
1946		Spartak Uzhhorod	DO Kyiv	Dzerzhynets Kharkiv
1947		Bilshovyk Mukacheve	Avanhard Kramatorsk	Lokomotyv Kyiv
1948	1	Torpedo Odesa	Dynamo Uzhhorod	Dynamo Vinnytsia
1948	2	Stal Kostiantynivka	Military Unit 25750 (Kyiv)	Stal Dniprodzerzhynsk
1948	Play-off	Torpedo Odesa	Stal Kostiantynivka	Dynamo Uzhhorod
1949	1	Metalurh Dniprodzerzhynsk	Metalurh Kostiantynivka	Traktor Kirovohrad
1949	2	DO Kyiv	Spartak Stanislav	Lokomotyv Ternopil
1949	Play-off	DO Kyiv	Metalurh Dniprodzerzhynsk	
1950		Spartak Uzhhorod	Trudovi Rezervy Voroshylovhrad	DO Kyiv
1951		DO Kyiv	SKA Lviv	Mashynobudivnyk Kyiv
1952		Metalurh Zaporizhia	Chervonyi Prapor Mykolaiv	Iskra Mukacheve
1953		Spartak Uzhhorod	Spartak Kherson	Torpedo Taganrog
1954		Mashynobudivnyk Kyiv	Spartak Stanislav	Budivelnyk Mykolaiv
1955		Spartak Stanislav	Spartak Kherson	Torpedo Kirovohrad
1956		Shakhtar Stakhanov	Mashynobudivnyk Kyiv	ODO Odesa
1957		SKVO Odesa	Lokomotyv Artemivsk	Mashynobudivnyk Kyiv
1958		Arsenal Kyiv	Metalurh Nikopol	Naftovyk Drohobych
1959		Avanhard Zhovti Vody	Torpedo Kharkiv	SKVO Odesa
1960	1	Sudnobudivnyk Mykolaiv	Lokomotyv Vinnytsia	Arsenal Kyiv
1960	2	Metalurh Zaporizhia	SKA Odesa	Trudovi Rezervy Luhansk
1961	1	Chornomorets Odesa	Lokomotyv Vinnytsia	Zirka Kirovohrad
1961	2	SKA Odesa	Trudovi Rezervy Luhansk	Avanhard Zhovti Vody
1962	1	Chornomorets Odesa	Polissya Zhytomyr	Lokomotyv Donetsk
1962	2	SKA Odesa	Metalurh Zaporizhia	SKA Kyiv
1962	3	Trudovi Rezervy Luhansk	Avanhard Simferopol	Lokomotyv Vinnytsia
1963	1	Lokomotyv Vinnytsia	SKA Lviv	Zirka Kirovohrad
1963	2	SKA Odesa	Azovstal Zhdanov	Torpedo Kharkiv
1964	1	Polissya Zhytomyr	SKA Lviv	Verkhovyna Uzhhorod
1964	2	SKA Kyiv	Lokomotyv Vinnytsia	Zirka Kirovohrad
1964	3	Tavriya Simferopol	Shakhtar Kadievka	Hirnyk Kryvyi Rih
1965	1	SKA Kyiv	Avanhard Zhovti Vody	Kolos Poltava
1965	2	SKA Lviv	Avanhard Ternopil	Zirka Kirovohrad
1965	3	Tavriya Simferopol	Shakhtar Kadievka	Kommunarets Kommunarsk
1966	1	Dynamo Khmelnytskyi	Desna Chernihiv	SKCF Sevastopol
1966	2	Avanhard Zhovti Vody	Lokomotyv Kherson	Dnipro Kremenchuk
1967	1	Avtomobilist Zhytomyr	Dnipro Cherkasy	Dnipro Kremenchuk
1967	2	Khimik Severodonetsk	Torpedo Kharkiv	Shakhtar Kadievka
1968	1	Avanhard Ternopil	Bukovyna Chernivtsi	Dynamo Khmelnytskyi
1968	2	Lokomotyv Donetsk	Spartak Sumy	Desna Chernihiv
1969	1	Spartak Ivano-Frankivsk	Prometey Dniprodzerzhynsk	Karpaty Mukacheve
1969	2	Spartak Sumy	Shakhtar Horlivka	Shakhtar Sverdlovsk
1970	2nd A	Metalurh Zaporizhia	Tavriya Simferopol	Avtomobilist Zhytomyr
1970	B	Khimik Severodonetsk	Lokomotyv Vinnytsia	Lokomotyv Donetsk
1971		Kryvbas Kryvyi Rih	Sudnobudivnyk Mykolaiv	Avtomobilist Zhytomyr
1972		Spartak Ivano-Frankivsk	Hoverla Uzhhorod	Tavriya Simferopol
1973		Tavriya Simferopol	Avtomobilist Zhytomyr	Sudnobudivnyk Mykolaiv
1974		Sudnobudivnyk Mykolaiv	Metalist Kharkiv	Kryvbas Kryvyi Rih
1975		Kryvbas Kryvyi Rih	Avtomobilist Zhytomyr	SC Lutsk
1976		Kryvbas Kryvyi Rih	Metalist Kharkiv	SKA Odesa
1977		SKA Odesa	SKA Kyiv	Kolos Nikopol
1978		Metalist Kharkiv	Kolos Nikopol	SKA Kyiv
1979		Kolos Nikopol	SKA Kyiv	SKA Lviv
1980		SKA Kyiv	Bukovyna Chernivtsi	SKA Lviv
1981		Kryvbas Kryvyi Rih	Nyva Vinnytsia	Avanhard Rivne
1982		Bukovyna Chernivtsi	Desna Chernihiv	Kolos Pavlohrad
1983		SKA Kyiv	Kolos Pavlohrad	Nyva Vinnytsia
1984		Nyva Vinnytsia	Kolos Pavlohrad	Sudnobudivnyk Mykolaiv
1985		Tavriya Simferopol	Nyva Vinnytsia	Sudnobudivnyk Mykolaiv
1986		Zoria Voroshylovhrad	Tavriya Simferopol	SKA Kyiv
1987		Tavriya Simferopol	Nyva Ternopil	Prykarpattia Ivano-Frankivsk
1988		Bukovyna Chernivtsi	Vorskla Poltava	SKA Kyiv
1989		Volyn Lutsk	Bukovyna Chernivtsi	Nyva Ternopil
1990		Torpedo Zaporizhia	Sudnobudivnyk Mykolaiv	Avanhard Rivne
1991		Naftovyk Okhtyrka	Prykarpattia Ivano-Frankivsk	Kolos Nikopol

== List of winners since the post-Soviet independence ==
=== Vyshcha Liha ===
Season	Champion	Runner-up	Third place	Top goalscorer	Rank
1992	Tavriya Simferopol	Dynamo Kyiv	Dnipro Dnipropetrovsk	(Ukraine) Yuri Hudymenko (Tavriya Simferopol, 12 goals)	N/A
1992–93	Dynamo Kyiv	Dnipro Dnipropetrovsk	Chornomorets Odesa	(Ukraine) Serhiy Husyev (Chornomorets Odesa, 17 goals)	28/39
1993–94	Dynamo Kyiv	Shakhtar Donetsk	Chornomorets Odesa	(Ukraine) Timerlan Huseinov (Chornomorets Odesa, 18 goals)	24/44
1994–95	Dynamo Kyiv	Chornomorets Odesa	Dnipro Dnipropetrovsk	(Tajikistan) Arsen Avakov (Torpedo Zaporizhzhia, 21 goals)	24/47
1995–96	Dynamo Kyiv	Chornomorets Odesa	Dnipro Dnipropetrovsk	(Ukraine) Timerlan Huseinov (Chornomorets Odesa, 20 goals)	19/48
1996–97	Dynamo Kyiv	Shakhtar Donetsk	Vorskla Poltava	(Ukraine) Oleh Matveyev (Shakhtar Donetsk, 21 goals)	22/48
1997–98	Dynamo Kyiv	Shakhtar Donetsk	Karpaty Lviv	(Ukraine) Serhii Rebrov (Dynamo Kyiv, 22 goals)	17/49
1998–99	Dynamo Kyiv	Shakhtar Donetsk	Kryvbas Kryvyi Rih	(Ukraine) Andriy Shevchenko (Dynamo Kyiv, 18 goals)	15/50
1999–00	Dynamo Kyiv	Shakhtar Donetsk	Kryvbas Kryvyi Rih	(Uzbekistan) Maksim Shatskikh (Dynamo Kyiv, 20 goals)	12/50
2000–01	Dynamo Kyiv	Shakhtar Donetsk	Dnipro Dnipropetrovsk	(Ukraine) Andriy Vorobei (Shakhtar Donetsk, 21 goals)	13/51
2001–02	Shakhtar Donetsk	Dynamo Kyiv	Metalurh Donetsk	(Ukraine) Serhiy Shyschenko (Metalurh Donetsk, 12 goals)	13/51
2002–03	Dynamo Kyiv	Shakhtar Donetsk	Metalurh Donetsk	(Uzbekistan) Maksim Shatskikh (Dynamo Kyiv, 22 goals)	14/52
2003–04	Dynamo Kyiv	Shakhtar Donetsk	Dnipro Dnipropetrovsk	(Georgia (country)) Georgi Demetradze (Metalurh Donetsk, 18 goals)	14/52
2004–05	Shakhtar Donetsk	Dynamo Kyiv	Metalurh Donetsk	(Ukraine) Oleksandr Kosyrin (Chornomorets Odesa, 14 goals)	15/52
2005–06	Shakhtar Donetsk	Dynamo Kyiv	Chornomorets Odesa	(Brazil) Brandão (Shakhtar Donetsk, 15 goals) (Nigeria) Emmanuel Okoduwa (Arsenal Kyiv, 15 goals)	13/52
2006–07	Dynamo Kyiv	Shakhtar Donetsk	Metalist Kharkiv	(Ukraine) Oleksandr Hladky (FC Kharkiv, 13 goals)	11/52
2007–08	Shakhtar Donetsk	Dynamo Kyiv	~~Metalist Kharkiv~~ (bronze stripped)	(Serbia) Marko Dević (Metalist Kharkiv, 19 goals)	12/53

=== Premier League ===
Season	Champion	Runner-up	Third place	Top goalscorer	Rank
2008–09	Dynamo Kyiv	Shakhtar Donetsk	Metalist Kharkiv	(Ukraine) Oleksandr Kovpak (Tavriya Simferopol, 17 goals)	7/53
2009–10	Shakhtar Donetsk	Dynamo Kyiv	Metalist Kharkiv	(Ukraine) Artem Milevskyi (Dynamo Kyiv, 17 goals)	7/53
2010–11	Shakhtar Donetsk	Dynamo Kyiv	Metalist Kharkiv	(Ukraine) Yevhen Seleznyov (Dnipro Dnipropetrovsk, 17 goals)	8/53
2011–12	Shakhtar Donetsk	Dynamo Kyiv	Metalist Kharkiv	(Ukraine) Yevhen Seleznyov (Shakhtar Donetsk, 14 goals) (Brazil) Maicon (Volyn Lutsk, 14 goals)	9/53
2012–13	Shakhtar Donetsk	Metalist Kharkiv	Dynamo Kyiv	(Armenia) Henrikh Mkhitaryan (Shakhtar Donetsk, 25 goals)	7/53
2013–14	Shakhtar Donetsk	Dnipro Dnipropetrovsk	Metalist Kharkiv	(Brazil) Luiz Adriano (Shakhtar Donetsk, 20 goals)	9/53
2014–15	Dynamo Kyiv	Shakhtar Donetsk	Dnipro Dnipropetrovsk	(Brazil) Alex Teixeira (Shakhtar Donetsk, 17 goals) (Romania) Eric Bicfalvi (Volyn Lutsk, 17 goals)	8/54
2015–16	Dynamo Kyiv	Shakhtar Donetsk	Dnipro Dnipropetrovsk	(Brazil) Alex Teixeira (Shakhtar Donetsk, 22 goals)	8/54
2016–17	Shakhtar Donetsk	Dynamo Kyiv	Zorya Luhansk	(Ukraine) Andriy Yarmolenko (Dynamo Kyiv, 15 goals)	8/55
2017–18	Shakhtar Donetsk	Dynamo Kyiv	Vorskla Poltava	(Argentina) Facundo Ferreyra (Shakhtar Donetsk, 21 goal)	8/55
2018–19	Shakhtar Donetsk	Dynamo Kyiv	Oleksandriya	(Ukraine) (Brazil) Júnior Moraes (Shakhtar Donetsk, 19 goals)	9/55
2019–20	Shakhtar Donetsk	Dynamo Kyiv	Zorya Luhansk	(Ukraine) Júnior Moraes (Shakhtar Donetsk, 20 goals)	10/55
2020–21	Dynamo Kyiv	Shakhtar Donetsk	Zorya Luhansk	(Ukraine) Vladyslav Kulach (Vorskla Poltava, 15 goals)	12/55
2021–22	Competition abandoned due to Russian invasion of Ukraine			(Ukraine) Artem Dovbyk (Dnipro-1, 14 goals)	13/55
2022–23	Shakhtar Donetsk	Dnipro-1	Zorya Luhansk	(Ukraine) Artem Dovbyk (Dnipro-1, 24 goals)	14/55
2023–24	Shakhtar Donetsk	Dynamo Kyiv	Kryvbas Kryvyi Rih	(Ukraine) Vladyslav Vanat (Dynamo Kyiv, 14 goals)	18/55
2024–25	Dynamo Kyiv	Oleksandriya	Shakhtar Donetsk	(Ukraine) Vladyslav Vanat (Dynamo Kyiv, 17 goals)	23/55
2025–26	Shakhtar Donetsk	LNZ Cherkasy	Polissya Zhytomyr	(Ukraine) Matviy Ponomarenko (Dynamo Kyiv, 13 goals)	23/55

Note: the Rank column shows the ranking of the league amongst members of UEFA.

== Performance by club ==
Performance by club since 1992.

Club	Winners	Runners-up	Third place	Winning years
Dynamo Kyiv	17	13	1	1992–93, 1993–94, 1994–95, 1995–96, 1996–97, 1997–98, 1998–99, 1999–2000, 2000–01, 2002–03, 2003–04, 2006–07, 2008–09, 2014–15, 2015–16, 2020–21, 2024–25
Shakhtar Donetsk	16	13	1	2001–02, 2004–05, 2005–06, 2007–08, 2009–10, 2010–11, 2011–12, 2012–13, 2013–14, 2016–17, 2017–18, 2018–19, 2019–20, 2022–23, 2023–24, 2025–26
Tavriya Simferopol	1	–	–	1992
Dnipro Dnipropetrovsk	–	2	7	
Chornomorets Odesa	–	2	3	
Metalist Kharkiv	–	1	6	
Oleksandriya	–	1	1	
Dnipro-1	–	1	–	
LNZ Cherkasy	–	1	–	
Zorya Luhansk	–	–	4	
Metalurh Donetsk	–	–	3	
Kryvbas Kryvyi Rih	–	–	3	
Vorskla Poltava	–	–	2	
Karpaty Lviv	–	–	1	
Polissya Zhytomyr	–	–	1	
Total	34	34	33	

- Note: Defunct teams marked in Italics.
Percentage of titles won by club since 1992
1. Dynamo Kyiv - 17 (50.0%)
2. FC Shakhtar Donetsk - 16 (47.1%)
3. SC Tavriya Simferopol -1 (2.90%)

== Separate notes about Soviet clubs ==
- FC Chornomorets Odesa, historically traces its lineage based on performance of Chornomorets only as a team of Black Sea Shipping Company with 1959 being the date of the club's establishment.
  - Since the club was acquired by Leonid Klimov, the club has also assumed history of other sports societies such as the city's trade union Kharchovyk (Pischevik), and later both FC Dynamo Odesa and Metalurh Odesa.
- FC Zorya Luhansk, always keeps the history of football club of Luhanskteplovoz, while existence of sports association of students Trudovi Rezervy also was mentioned
- FC Metalist Kharkiv, always keeps the history of football club of Malyshev Factory, while existence of the Southern Railways Lokomotyv also was mentioned, yet FC Dynamo Kharkiv not at all
- FC Dnipro, keeps history of the Yuzhmash's football club Dnepr, part of the Soviet Zenit sports society and successor of Metalurh sports society of the local Petrovsky factory that existed since 1925 as Stal. Since dissolution of the Soviet Union, historical claims were laid for club that existed since 1918.

== See also ==
- Football in Ukraine
- Ukrainian football league system
- Soviet Top League
