= Football Championship of the Ukrainian SSR =

Football Championship of the Ukrainian SSR (Ukraine)
- Founded: 1921 (original); 1960 (part of Class B / Second League)
- Folded: 1991 (reformed)
- Country: Ukrainian SSR; Moldavian SSR (before 1980); Belarusian SSR (before 1980)
- Level on pyramid: 1
- Promotion to: Vtoraya Gruppa / Class B (before 1960); Class A / First League (since 1960)
- Relegation to: Regional competitions (before 1960); Amateurs (since 1964)
- Domestic cup: Football Cup of the Ukrainian SSR
- Last champions: Naftovyk Okhtyrka (1st title) (1991)
- Most championships: 4 - SKA Kyiv and Kryvbas; 8 - Kharkiv city football team (Note: Most often and its majority represented by players of FC Dynamo Kharkiv that competed at the Kharkiv city championship) (as Intercities champion)

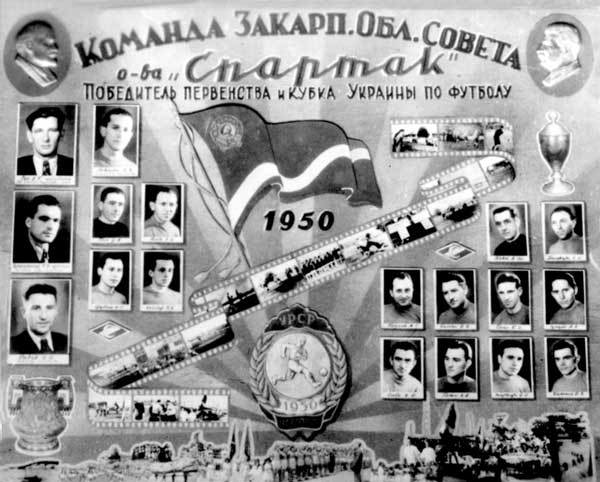
Spartak Zakarpattia Oblast, the 1950 winner of the Ukrainian Championship and Cup

The Football Championship of the Ukrainian SSR (Ukraine) (Ukrainian: Першість України з футболу, Russian: Первенство Украины по футболу) was a top competition of association football in the Ukrainian SSR in 1921-91. Few Ukrainian clubs competed in the championship, such as Dynamo Kyiv.

The competitions were organized by the Football Federation of the Ukrainian SSR that was created in 1959 in place of the Football Section.

Before 1980, selected teams of Moldavian SSR participated in the championship.

== Historical outlook ==
Established as the All-Ukrainian inter-city competition in 1921, it was later included in a number of All-Ukrainian Olympiads and Spartakiads. During several seasons, the competitions were suspended due to football being identified as a "non-proletariat sport". Also, because of a difficult social cataclysm in 1933 (Holodomor), there were no competitions as well.

With the establishment of the All-Union competitions in 1936 (united competitions), the republican football competitions in Ukraine were degraded to the regional level. Since then and before the Great Patriotic War, the champion of Ukraine title was awarded to a team that would place first in the First Group (Persha Hrupa) of the championship among sports societies and agencies. In 1960, those competitions were suspended, and the republican title was awarded to the top team of the Ukrainian Zone in the Class B (Soviet Second League). The consistent and uniform All-Ukrainian Soviet competition took its beginning from 1960, when the first All-Ukrainian league was formed as part of the Soviet Second League, better known back then as the Klass B, with the UkrSSR zone. In 1964, there were also established lower-level republican competitions among collectives of physical culture (KFK). In 1970 the Soviet Second League was named as the second group of Klass A for the season, before changing to simply the Soviet Second League. For the 1990 and 1991 seasons, this competition was moved further down the Soviet league levels into the newly formed Soviet Second League B, also earlier known as the G group or simply the Third League.

Until World War II up to 11 clubs competed in the Soviet championship. Nine clubs from Ukraine participated in the first season of the Soviet competition: Dynamo Kyiv (I Division); Dynamo Dnipropetrovsk and Dynamo Kharkiv (II Division); Dynamo Odesa, Spartak Kharkiv, Ugolschiki Staline, Lokomotyv Kyiv (III Division); Traktor Plant Kharkiv, Stal Dnipropetrovsk (IV Division). Later other clubs has entered the competition: Silmash Kharkiv, Frunze Plant Kostiantynivka, Sudostroitel Mykolaiv, and Dzerzhynets Voroshylovhrad.

The Ukrainian club competition in the Second League had existed prior to 1963, but was not such an exclusive and consistent part of the Soviet League system. In 1970 and 1990 there were few reforms. In 1970, the First League was reduced to a single group and, because of that, the Second League extended into upper and lower (B) divisions. The lower division was named the Second League B and, for the next season, was liquidated. In 1990, a similar reform was taken upon the Second League. Its 10 regional groups were reduced to just three, still by the regional principle, while the league was renamed the Buffer League (West, Center, and East). This reform also introduced what was planned to be a fourth level of professional competition, allowing each republic to have its own professional league. That fourth level competition was named the Second League, the former name of the Buffer League.

== Republican competitions before 1936 ==
=== Championship of cities ===
The first nationwide football competitions in Ukraine were established in 1921 as an inter-city competition of the Ukrainian SSR. The city teams consisted of different players from various teams of a particular city. Until 1930 the competition took place in Kharkiv, in 1931 it was conducted in Kyiv, and in 1932 – in Dnipropetrovsk and Zaporizhzhia.

In 1936, the competition was consolidated into the Soviet competitions, with some of its teams qualifying for the Soviet Top League. The championship itself became a republican level competition, with its best team qualifying for the Soviet competitions.

Season	Champion	Runner-up	3rd Position
1921	Kharkiv	Odesa	Mykolaiv; Taganrog
1922	Kharkiv	Odesa	Kyiv; Mykolaiv
1923	Kharkiv	Yuzivka	Odesa
1924	Kharkiv	Odesa	Stalino
1925	no competitions		
1926	no competitions		
1927	Kharkiv	Mykolaiv	Odesa
1928	Kharkiv	Horlivka	Mykolaiv
1929	no competitions		
1930	no competitions		
1931	Kyiv	Kharkiv	Kadiyivka; Mykolaiv
1932	Kharkiv	Donbas	Dnipropetrovsk
1933	no competitions		
1934	Kharkiv	Kyiv	Vinnytsia; Odesa
1935	Dnipropetrovsk	Kyiv	Kharkiv

=== Championship of the Proletarian Sports Society Dynamo ===
Parallel to the championship of cities there also existed separate tournament that was played among teams of Dynamo society (Proletarian Sports Society (PST) Dynamo) located throughout the Ukrainian SSR. The first tournament was conducted as part of the All-Ukrainian Dynamo Festival which was organized on the orders of the top OGPU official in Ukraine Vsevolod Balitsky. The tournament was also known as the Dynamiada of Ukraine. There existed some degree of confusion due to great number of tournament at that time.

Season	Champion	Runner-up	3rd Position
1929 (Note: officially named as the All-Ukrainian Dynamo Festival)	Dynamo Kharkiv	Dynamo Kyiv	Dynamo Dnipropetrovsk; Dynamo Stalino
1931 (Note: officially named as the Cup of the All-Ukrainian PST Dynamo)	Dynamo Kyiv	Dynamo Kharkiv	Dynamo Odesa; Dynamo Stalino
1932 (Note: officially named as the Challenge of the All-Ukrainian PST Dynamo)	Dynamo Kharkiv	Dynamo Kyiv	Dynamo Odesa; Dynamo Stalino
1933 (Note: officially named as the All-Ukrainian Spartakiade of Dynamo)	Dynamo Kyiv	Dynamo Kharkiv	Dynamo Odesa; Dynamo Stalino
1934 (Note: officially named as the Challenge of the All-Ukrainian PST Dynamo)	Dynamo Kharkiv	Dynamo Kyiv	Dynamo Stalino; Dynamo Dnipropetrovsk
1935 (Note: officially named as the Challenge of the All-Ukrainian PST Dynamo)	Dynamo Kyiv	Dynamo Dnipropetrovsk	Dynamo Kharkiv

== Republican competitions after 1936 ==
=== Football Championship among teams of sports societies (non-professional level) ===
The competitions were considered to be amateur. In Soviet Union officially all sports players were amateur athletes, however to differentiate level of teams, there were teams of sports societies and agencies (amateurs) and teams of masters (professionals).

Nonetheless in 1936 and in 1938 there were played games of one more tournament called the Season's Cup of the Ukrainian SSR to which qualified the cup holder and the champion. Those tournament were discontinued and there only were two games.

Season	Group	Champion	Runner-up	3rd Position
1936		Ordzhonikidze Factory Kramatorsk	Petrovsky Factory Dnipropetrovsk	UDKA Kyiv
1937		Spartak Dnipropetrovsk	Zenit Staline	Stalinets Kharkiv
1938		Dzerzhynets Voroshylovhrad	Stal Dniprodzerzhynsk	Dynamo Mykolaiv
1939		Lokomotyv Zaporizhzhia	Kharchovyk Odesa	Lokomotyv Kharkiv
1940		Lokomotyv Zaporizhzhia	Stakhanovets Ordzhonikidze	Avanhard Kramatorsk
1941–1945	no competitions World War II			
1946		Spartak Uzhhorod	BO Kyiv	Dzerzhynets Kharkiv
1947		Bilshovyk Mukacheve	Avanhard Kramatorsk	Lokomotyv Kyiv
1948	1	Torpedo Odesa	Dynamo Uzhhorod	Dynamo Vinnytsia
1948	2	Stal Kostiantynivka	Military Unit 25750 (Kyiv)	Stal Dniprodzerzhynsk
1948	Play-off	Torpedo Odesa	Stal Kostiantynivka	Dynamo Uzhhorod
1949	1	Metalurh Dniprodzerzhynsk	Metalurh Kostiantynivka	Traktor Kirovohrad
1949	2	BO Kyiv	Spartak Stanislav	Lokomotyv Ternopil
1949	Play-off	BO Kyiv	Metalurh Dniprodzerzhynsk	
1950		Spartak Uzhhorod ‡	Labor Reserves Voroshylovhrad	BO Kyiv
1951		BO Kyiv	ODO Lviv	Mashynobudivnyk Kyiv
1952		Metalurh Zaporizhzhia ‡	Chervonyi Styah Mykolaiv	Iskra Mukacheve
1953		Spartak Uzhhorod	Spartak Kherson	Torpedo Kharkiv
1954		Zenit Kyiv	Spartak Stanislav	Budivelnyk Mykolaiv
1955		Spartak Stanislav	Spartak Kherson	Torpedo Kirovohrad
1956		Shakhtar Kadiivka	Mashynobudivnyk Kyiv	ODO Odesa
1957		SKVO Odesa ‡	Lokomotyv Artemivsk	Mashynobudivnyk Kyiv
1958		Mashynobudivnyk Kyiv	Metalurh Nikopol	Naftovyk Drohobych
1959		Avanhard Zhovti Vody	Torpedo Kharkiv	SKVO Odesa

‡ – winners of the Football Cup of the Ukrainian SSR

=== Football Championship among teams of masters (professional level) ===
While many Ukrainian teams competed in the Class B before 1960, it was not until then when they were organized into own republican competition which was officially considered as the one among teams of masters (professional teams).

For 1990 and 1991 the Soviet Second League was again restructured and degraded farther into the fourth division of the competition yielding to the newly formed Buffer League. Buffer League (a.k.a. Second League) covered much bigger area for the competition, while the Second League (a.k.a. Lower Second League) was assigned specifically for most of the Soviet republics including Ukraine.

==== Soviet Class B (Ukraine) ====
Official name of the established competition was the Class B, UkrSSR (Russian: класс «Б», УССР). Originally reestablished soon after the World War II as the Second Group (1945-1949), the Class B football competitions succeeded it in 1950 as part of the Soviet second tier. As part of the Ukrainian championship, Class B existed in 1960-1970.

Note: until 1963 Class B was the second division of the Soviet football competition, analog of the First League with several zones formed by territorial principle. Since then it was degraded into the third and later renamed as the Soviet Second League.

Ukrainian competitions consisted of two zones until 1970, when it was restructured into two hierarchical leagues. After 1971 teams of the lower league lost their professional status (teams of masters).

===== Soviet second-tiered competitions =====
Season	Group	Champion	Runner-up	3rd Position
1960	1	Sudnobudivnyk Mykolaiv	Lokomotyv Vinnytsia	Arsenal Kyiv
1960	2	Metalurh Zaporizhzhia	SKA Odesa	Trudovi Rezervy Luhansk
1960	Play-off	Metalurh Zaporizhzhia	Sudnobudivnyk Mykolaiv	
1961	1	Chornomorets Odesa	Lokomotyv Vinnytsia	Zirka Kirovohrad
1961	2	SKA Odesa	Trudovi Rezervy Luhansk	Avanhard Zhovti Vody
1961	Play-off	Chornomorets Odesa	SKA Odesa	Lokomotyv Vinnytsia
1962		Trudovi Rezervy Luhansk	Chornomorets Odesa	Avanhard Simferopol

===== Soviet third-tiered competitions =====
Season	Group	Champion	Runner-up	3rd Position
1963	1	Lokomotyv Vinnytsia	SKA Lviv	Zirka Kirovohrad
1963	2	SKA Odesa	Azovstal Zhdanov	Torpedo Kharkiv
1963	Play-off	SKA Odesa	Lokomotyv Vinnytsia	Azovstal Zhdanov
1964		Lokomotyv Vinnytsia	SKA Kyiv	Polissya Zhytomyr
1965		SKA Lviv	SKA Kyiv	Avanhard Zhovti Vody
1966	1	Dynamo Khmelnytskyi	Desna Chernihiv	SKCF Sevastopol
1966	2	Avanhard Zhovti Vody	Lokomotyv Kherson	Dnipro Kremenchuk
1966	Play-off	Avanhard Zhovti Vody	Dynamo Khmelnytskyi	Lokomotyv Kherson
1967	1	Avtomobilist Zhytomyr	Dnipro Cherkasy	Dnipro Kremenchuk
1967	2	Khimik Severodonetsk	Torpedo Kharkiv	Shakhtar Kadievka
1967	Play-off	Avtomobilist Zhytomyr	Khimik Severodonetsk	Dnipro Kremenchuk
1968	1	Avanhard Ternopil	Bukovyna Chernivtsi	Dynamo Khmelnytskyi
1968	2	Lokomotyv Donetsk	Spartak Sumy	Desna Chernihiv
1968	Play-off	Avanhard Ternopil	Bukovyna Chernivtsi	Shakhtar Kadiyevka
1969	1	Spartak Ivano-Frankivsk	Prometey Dniprodzerzhynsk	Karpaty Mukacheve
1969	2	Spartak Sumy	Shakhtar Horlivka	Shakhtar Sverdlovsk
1969	Play-off	Spartak Ivano-Frankivsk	Shakhtar Horlivka	Spartak Sumy

===== Soviet fourth-tiered competitions =====
Season	Champion	Runner-up	3rd Position
1970	Khimik Severodonetsk	Lokomotyv Vinnytsia	Lokomotyv Donetsk

==== Soviet Class A, Second Group (Ukraine, Soviet third tier) ====
Season	Champion	Runner-up	3rd Position
1970	Metalurh Zaporizhzhia	Tavriya Simferopol	Avtomobilist Zhytomyr

==== Second League (Soviet third tier) ====
Season	Champion	Runner-up	3rd Position
1971	Kryvbas Kryvyi Rih	Sudnobudivelnyk Mykolaiv	Avtomobilist Zhytomyr
1972	Spartak Ivano-Frankivsk	Hoverla Uzhhorod	Tavriya Simferopol
1973	Tavriya Simferopol	Avtomobilist Zhytomyr	Sudnobudivelnyk Mykolaiv
1974	Sudnobudivelnyk Mykolaiv	Metalist Kharkiv	Kryvbas Kryvyi Rih
1975	Kryvbas Kryvyi Rih	Avtomobilist Zhytomyr	SC Lutsk
1976	Kryvbas Kryvyi Rih	Metalist Kharkiv	SCA Odesa
1977	SCA Odesa	SKA Kyiv	Kolos Nikopol
1978	Metalist Kharkiv	Kolos Nikopol	SKA Kyiv
1979	Kolos Nikopol	SKA Kyiv	SKA Lviv
1980	SKA Kyiv	Bukovyna Chernivtsi	SKA Lviv
1981	Kryvbas Kryvyi Rih	Nyva Vinnytsia	Avanhard Rivne
1982	Bukovyna Chernivtsi	Desna Chernihiv	Kolos Pavlohrad
1983	SKA Kyiv	Kolos Pavlohrad	Nyva Vinnytsia
1984	Nyva Vinnytsia	Kolos Pavlohrad	Sudnobudivelnyk Mykolaiv
1985	Tavriya Simferopol	Nyva Vinnytsia	Sudnobudivelnyk Mykolaiv
1986	Zoria Voroshylovhrad	Tavriya Simferopol	SKA Kyiv
1987	Tavriya Simferopol	Nyva Ternopil	Prykarpattia Ivano-Frankivsk
1988	Bukovyna Chernivtsi	Vorskla Poltava	SKA Odesa
1989	Volyn Lutsk	Bukovyna Chernivtsi	Nyva Ternopil

==== Second League Lower (Soviet fourth tier) ====
Season	Champion	Runner-up	3rd Position
1990	Torpedo Zaporizhzhia	Sudnobudivelnyk Mykolaiv	Avanhard Rivne
1991	Naftovyk Okhtyrka	Prykarpattia Ivano-Frankivsk	Kolos Nikopol

== List of all champions ==
=== Performance by club ===
The table does not include city teams that competed in the cities' championship.

Club	Winners	Runners-up	Third place	Winning years
Tavriya Simferopol	5	1	2	1973, 1985, 1987
SKA Kyiv	4	5	4	1949, 1951, 1980, 1983
Kryvbas Kryvyi Rih	4	–	1	1971, 1975, 1976, 1981
Spartak Ivano-Frankivsk	3	2	2	1955, 1969, 1972
SKA Odesa	3	1	4	1957, 1963, 1977
Spartak Uzhhorod	3	1	–	1946, 1950, 1953
Metalurh Zaporizhzhia	3	–	–	1952, 1960, 1970
Zorya Luhansk	3	–	–	1938, 1962, 1986
Nyva Vinnytsia	2	3	3	1964, 1984
Bukovyna Chernivtsi	2	3	–	1982, 1988
Arsenal Kyiv	2	1	–	1954, 1958
Avanhard Zhovti Vody	2	–	1	1959, 1966
Lokomotyv Zaporizhzhia	2	–	–	1939, 1940
Sudnobudivelnyk Mykolaiv	1	3	3	1974
Avtomobilist Zhytomyr	1	2	3	1967
Kolos Nikopol	1	2	2	1979
Metalist Kharkiv	1	2	1	1978
Chornomorets Odesa	1	2	–	1961
SKA Lviv	1	1	3	1965
Avanhard Kramatorsk	1	1	1	1936
Shakhtar Stakhanov	1	–	1	1956
Spartak Dnipropetrovsk	1	–	–	1937
Bilshovyk Mukacheve	1	–	–	1947
Torpedo Odesa	1	–	–	1948
Avanhard Ternopil	1	–	–	1968
Volyn Lutsk	1	–	–	1989
Torpedo Zaporizhzhia	1	–	–	1990
Naftovyk Okhtyrka	1	–	–	1991

=== Performance by city (Cities' championship) ===
The 1936 championship is not included.

Club	Winners	Runners-up	Third place	Winning years
Kharkiv	8	1	1	1921, 1922, 1923, 1924, 1927, 1928, 1932, 1934
Kyiv	1	2	1	1931
Dnipropetrovsk	1	–	1	1935

== Pre-World War II teams of masters (professional clubs) in Ukraine ==
- 1936–1941 FC Dinamo Kyiv
- 1936–1937 FC Dinamo Dnepropetrovsk
- 1936–1940 FC Dynamo Kharkiv
- 1936–1939 FC Dinamo Odesa
- 1936–1941 FC Spartak Kharkiv
- 1936–1941 FC Ugolshchiki Gorlovka → FC Stakhanovets Stalino (FC Shakhtar Donetsk)
- 1936–1940 FC Lokomotyv Kyiv
- 1936–1937 FC KhTZ Kharkiv → FC Traktor Kharkiv (FC Torpedo Kharkiv)
- 1936 FC Stal Dnepropetrovsk
- 1936–1940 FC Serp i Molot Kharkiv (FC Silmash Kharkiv)
- 1936–1937 FC Stal Konstantinovka
- 1937 FC Lokomotiv Dnepropetrovsk
- 1937–1940 FC Sudostroitel Nikolayev
- 1937 FC Spartak Kyiv
- 1937–1939 FC Stal Dnepropetrovsk (FC Dnipro)
- 1939–1940 FC Dzerzhynets Voroshylovgrad (FC Zorya Luhansk)
- 1940–1941 FC Pishchevik Odesa (FC Spartak Odesa)

== Post war teams of masters (professional clubs) in Ukraine before Ukrainian Class B ==
- 1945– FC Dynamo Kyiv
- 1945– FC Shakhter Stalino
- 1945–1955 FC Lokomotyv Kharkiv
- 1945–1950 FC Pishchevik Odesa
- 1946–1949, 1953– FC Stal Dnepropetrovsk → FC Metallurg Dnepropetrovsk
- 1946–1949, 1957– FC Sudostroitel Nikolayev → FC Avangard Nikolayev
- 1947–1949, 1952– ODO Kyiv
- 1947–1949 FC Spartak Lvov
- 1947–1949 FC Spartak Kherson
- 1947–1949, 1951, 1954– FC Spartak Uzhgorod
- 1947–1949 FC Metalist Kharkiv
- 1947–1949 FC Dinamo Voroshylovgrad
- 1947–1949 FC Bolshevik Zaporizhzhia → FC Lokomotiv Zaporizhzhia
- 1948–1949 FC Avangard Kramatorsk
- 1948–1949, 1957– FC Shakhter Kadeevka
- 1948–1949 FC Bolshevik Mukachevo
- 1949 FC Spartak Kyiv
- 1949 FC Torpedo Kharkiv
- 1949 FC Dinamo Chernovtsy
- 1949, 1957– FC Trudovye Rezervy Voroshylovgrad
- 1949, 1954– DO Lvov
- 1953–1954 FC Metallurg Odesa
- 1953– FC Metallurg Zaporizhzhia
- 1955– FC Pishchevik Odesa → FC Chernomorets Odesa
- 1956– FC Avangard Kharkiv
- 1956– FC Spartak Stanislav
- 1957– SC ChF Sevastopol
- 1957– FC Kolgospnik Poltava
- 1957– FC Khimik Dneprodzerzhynsk
- 1958– SKVO Odesa
- 1958– FC Avangard Simferopol → SC Tavriya Simferopol
- 1958– FC Lokomotiv Vinnitsa
- 1958– FC Kolgospnik Rovno
- 1958– FC Lokomotiv Stalino
- 1959– FC Kolgospnik Cherkassy
- 1959– FC Arsenal Kyiv
- 1959– FC Zirka Kirovograd
- 1959– FC Avangard Zhytomir
- 1959– Krivoi Rog team
- 1959– FC Avangard Ternopol
- 1959– FC Shakhter Gorlovka

== Participated teams by regions ==
In bold are teams that played at least 10 seasons. The underlined are teams that at some point played in different region. In brackets is a number of seasons.

Region	Teams
Crimea (1954)	Avanhard Sevastopol (1954–1959 {6}), Metalurh Kerch (1954–1959 {6}), Trud Simferopol (1954 {1}), Burevisnyk Simferopol (1955–1957 {3}), DOF Sevastopol (1956 {1}), Avanhard Simferopol (1959 {1})
Cherkasy Oblast (1954)	Torpedo Cherkasy (1954 {1}), Burevisnyk Cherkasy (1955, 1956 {2}), Kolhospnyk Cherkasy (1957 {1}), Shakhtar Vatutine (1958, 1959 {2}), Spartak Cherkasy (1958 {1}), Avanhard Uman (1959 {1})
Chernihiv Oblast (1932)	Chernihiv (1936, 1954–1956 {4}), Spartak Chernihiv (1937–1940, 1949, 1951 {6}), Dynamo Chernihiv (1946, 1948 {2}), Vympel Chernihiv (1947 {1}), Mashynobudivnyk Prylulki (1949, 1952 {2}), Chervona Zirka Chernihiv (1952 {1}), Torpedo Prylulki (1953 {1}), Avanhard Prylulki (1957, 1959 {2}), Avanhard Chernihiv (1958, 1959 {2}), Nizhyn (1958 {1})
Chernivtsi Oblast (1940)	Spartak Chernivtsi (1946, 1947, 1949 {3}), Dynamo Chernivtsi (1948, 1950–1955, 1958 {8}), Lokomotyv Chernivtsi (1949 {1}), Burevisnyk Chernivtsi (1956 {1}), Avanhard Chernivtsi (1958, 1959 {2}), Mashynobudivnyk Chernivtsi (1959 {1})
Dnipropetrovsk Oblast (1932)	Metalurh Dnipropetrovsk (1936, 1950, 1957 {3}), Dniprodzerzhynsk (1936 {1}), Kryvyi Rih (1936 {1}), Rot Front Kryvyi Rih (1937 {1}), Ordzhonikidze (1936–1938 {3}), Stakhanovets Ordzhonikidze (1939, 1940 {2}), **Stal/Metalurh Dniprodzerzhynsk** (1937–1940, 1948–1952, 1958 {10}), Spartak Dnipropetrovsk (1937–1940, 1946 {5}), Synelnykove (1937 {1}), Lokomotyv Synelnykove (1938 {1}), Stal/Metalurh Kryvyi Rih (1938, 1948, 1949, 1951, 1952, 1955, 1958 {7}), Lokomotyv Dnipropetrovsk (1939, 1948–1950 {4}), Spartak Kryvyi Rih (1939, 1948, 1950 {3}), Dynamo Dnipropetrovsk (1946–1949, 1951, 1952 {6}), Khimik Pavlohrad (1949 {1}), Metalurh Novomoskovsk (1949 {1}), Metalurh Nikopol (1949, 1954–1959 {7}), Torpedo Dnipropetrovsk (1950, 1951 {2}), Mashynobudivnyk Dnipropetrovsk (1952–1954, 1956, 1958, 1959 {6}), Khimik Dniprodzerzhynsk (1953–1956 {4}), Dnipropetrovsk (1955 {1}), r/u imeni Libknekhta Kryvyi Rih (1956 {1}), r/u imeni Dzerzhynskoho Kryvyi Rih (1956, 1957 {2}), Avanhard Ordzhonikidze (1957–1959 {3}), Avanhard Zhovti Vody (1958, 1959 {2}), Shakhtar Terny (1958 {1}), Avanhard Dniprodzerzhynsk (1959 {1}), r/u imeni Kominterna Kryvyi Rih (1959 {1})
Donetsk Oblast (1932)	Starobilsk (1936–1938 {3}), Krasnyi Luch (1936–1938 {3}), Kadiivka (1936, 1948 {2}), Voroshylovsk (1936, 1937 {2}), Voroshilovgrad (1936 {1}), **Avanhard Kramatorsk** (1936–1940, 1946–1952, 1956–1959 {16}), Chystiakove (1936–1938 {3}), Artemivsk (1936, 1938 {2}), Makiivka (1936, 1938 {2}), Postysheve/Krasnoarmiisk (1936, 1937 {2}), Horlivka (1936 {1}), Kostiantynivka (1936 {1}), z-d imeni Stalina Stalino (1936 {1}), Rubizhne (1937 {1}), Zenit Stalino (1937–1939 {3}), Avanhard Horlivka (1937–1940, 1946 {5}), Stal/Metalurh Makiivka (1937, 1948–1951 {5}), Sloviansk (1937, 1938, 1948 {3}), Zhdanov/Mariupol (1937, 1950 {2}), Druzhkivka (1937 {1}), Stakhanovets Krasnoarmiisk (1938 {1}), Stal/Metalurh Kostiantynivka (1938, 1939, 1940, 1946, 1948–1952 {9}), Avanhard Druzhkivka (1938–1940, 1959 {4}), **Stal/Metalurh Zhdanov/Mariupol** (1946, 1948, 1949, 1951–1957 {10}), Stakhanovets/Shakhtar Rutchenkove (1946, 1948, 1950, 1951, 1959 {5}), Lokomotyv Yasynuvata (1946, 1948, 1949 {3}), Shakhtar Chystiakove (1948, 1956–1959 {5}), Shakhtar Smolianka (1948, 1949, 1958 {3}), Shakhtar Horlivka (1948, 1949, 1958 {3}), Shakhtar Yenakieve (1948, 1951, 1955 {3}), Stal/Metalurh Yenakieve (1948, 1949, 1957 {3}), Stal/Metalurh Horlivka (1948, 1954, 1955 {3}), Shakhtar Druzhkivka (1948, 1949 {2}), Lokomotyv Debaltseve (1948 {1}), Azovstal Mariupol (1948 {1}), Lokomotyv Artemivsk (1949–1957 {9}), Metalurh Stalino (1950–1952, 1958 {4}), Khimik Horlivka (1950–1952 {3}), Budivelnyk Zhdanov (1951 {1}), Metalurh Chasiv Yar (1952 {1}), Shakhtar Stalino (1954–1956 {3}), Shakhtar Budyonivka (1957, 1958 {2}), Shakhtar Makiivka (1957 {1}), Dzerzhynets Dzerzhynsk (1957 {1}), Avanhard Zhdanov (1958, 1959 {2}), Avanhard Yenakieve (1958, 1959 {2}), z-d imeni Ordzhonikidze Chasiv Yar (1958 {1}), Avanhard Chasiv Yar (1959 {1}), Khimik Makiivka (1959 {1})
Drohobych Oblast (1939-59)	Spartak Drohobych (1946, 1948 {2}), Bilshovyk Sambir (1947–1949 {3}), DO Stryi (1948 {1}), Naftovyk Boryslav (1948–1950, 1952 {4}), Naftovyk Stryi (1949 {1}), Dynamo Drohobych (1949 {1}), Naftovyk Drohobych (1951, 1953–1956, 1958, 1959 {7}), Kolhospnyk Stryi (1951 {1})
Ivano-Frankivsk Oblast (1939)	Spartak Stanislav (1946, 1949–1955 {8}), Dynamo Stanislav (1947–1949 {3}), Medyk Stanislav (1948 {1}), Stanislav (1951 {1}), Khimik Kalush (1956, 1958, 1959 {3}), Avanhard Kolomyia (1958, 1959 {2}), Avanhard Stanislav (1958 {1}), Kharchovyk Stanislav (1959 {1})
Izmail Oblast (1940-54)	Spartak Izmail (1946–1949 {4}), DO Izmail (1949 {1}), Vodnyk Izmail (1951, 1952 {2}), Dynamo Izmail (1953 {1})
Kharkiv Oblast (1932)	Kupiansk (1936–1938 {3}), Stalinets/KhEMZ Kharkiv (1936, 1937 {2}), Lokomotyv Kharkiv (1938, 1939 {2}), Lokomotyv Lozova (1938, 1956, 1958, 1959 {4}), Zenit Kharkiv (1940 {1}), Silmash Kharkiv (1946 {1}), Zdorovia Kharkiv (1946 {1}), Dzerzhynets Kharkiv (1946, 1951, 1952 {3}), Traktor Kharkiv (1947, 1951 {2}), **Torpedo Kharkiv** (1948, 1950, 1952–1959 {10}), Spartak Kharkiv (1948, 1957, 1959 {3}), Lokomotyv Izyum (1948, 1949 {2}), Kharchovyk Kupyansk (1948 {1}), Dynamo Kharkiv (1948, 1957 {2}), Chervonyi Prapor Kharkiv (1949 {1}), Lokomotyv Kupyansk (1949 {1}), Spartak Kupyansk (1949 {1}), Dzerzhynskyi Raion Kharkiv (1950 {1}), Kahanovych Raion Kharkiv (1950 {1}), Iskra Kharkiv (1951 {1}), Enerhia Kharkiv (1954–1956 {3}), Chuhuiv (1957–1959 {3}), Donetsk Izyum (1957 {1}), Avanhard Kharkiv (1958 {1})
Kherson Oblast (1944)	Kherson (1936, 1937 {2}), Znannia Kherson (1938 {1}), Spartak Kherson (1946, 1950–1957 {9}), Dynamo Kherson (1947 {1}), Avanhard Kherson (1948, 1949, 1958, 1959 {4}), Torpedo Henichesk (1949 {1}), Enerhia Nova Kakhovka (1954, 1956, 1957, 1959 {4}), Enerhia Kakhovka (1955 {1})
Khmelnytskyi Oblast (1937)	Kamianets-Podilsk (1936–1938 {3}), Dynamo Kamianets-Podilskyi (1939, 1948, 1949 {3}), **Dynamo Khmelnytskyi/Proskuriv** (1940, 1946–1949, 1951–1956, 1958, 1959 {13}), Lokomotyv Shepetivka (1948, 1949 {2}), Burevisnyk Kamianets-Podilskyi (1957–1959 {3})
Kyiv City (1932)	DO/UDKA (1936, 1946, 1949–1951 {5}), Vympel (1937 {1}), Dynamo (klubnaya)/Dynamo-2 (1938, 1939, 1948, 1950, 1951, 1956 {6}), Lokomotyv (1946, 1947, 1953–1957 {7}), Spartak (1946, 1954, 1956 {3}), v/c 25750 (1948 {1}), Trudovi Rezervy (1948 {1}), Mashynobudivnyk (1949, 1952, 1953, 1955–1958 {7}), Zenit (1954 {1}), Chervonyi Prapor (1949 {1}), Bilshovyk (1952 {1}), Torpedo (1955–1959 {5}), Zhovtnevyi Raion (1957–1959 {3}), DRVZ (1957–1959 {3})
Kyiv Oblast (1932)	Zhytomyr (1936–1938, 1954, 1956 {5}), Berdychiv (1936–1938 {3}), Korosten (1936–1938 {3}), Novohrad-Volynskyi (1937, 1938 {2}), Uman (1937, 1938 {2}), Smila (1938 {1}), Pershyi Cherkaskyi (1947 {1}), Mashynobudivnyk Smila (1948, 1949 {2}), DO Cherkasy (1948, 1949 {2}), Mashynobudivnyk Fastiv (1948, 1949 {2}), Trud Vasylkiv (1948 {1}), v/c Bila Tserkva (1948 {1}), Urozhai Boryspil (1949 {1}), Spartak Bila Tserkva (1952, 1954–1956, 1958, 1959 {6}), Torpedo Fastiv (1953, 1957 {2})
Kirovohrad Oblast (1939)	Silmash Kirovohrad (1939, 1940 {2}), Dynamo Kirovohrad (1946, 1947 {2}), Lokomotyv Znamianka (1948, 1949 {2}), Shakhtar Oleksandria (1948, 1949, 1956–1959 {6}), Traktor Kirovohrad (1948–1952 {5}), Lokomotyv Haivoron (1949 {1}), Urozhai Kirovohrad (1949 {1}), Torpedo Kirovohrad (1953–1957 {5}), Avanhard Kirovohrad (1958 {1}), KremHESbud (1959 {1}), Chervona Zirka Kirovohrad (1959 {1})
Lviv Oblast (1939)	Spartak Lviv (1946 {1}), Dynamo Lviv (1947, 1949, 1953, 1956 {4}), Bilshovyk Zolochiv (1948, 1949 {2}), Bilshovyk Vynnyky (1949 {1}), DO Lviv (1950–1952 {3}), Kharchovyk Vynnyky (1951, 1952 {2}), Trud Lviv (1954 {1}), Torpedo Lviv (1955 {1}), Avanhard Lviv (1958, 1959 {2})
Luhansk Oblast (1938)	**Stakhanovets/Shakhtar Kadiivka/Serho** (1937, 1939, 1940, 1947, 1950–1956 {11}), Dzerzhynets Voroshilovgrad (1937, 1938, 1940, 1948, 1952 {5}), z-d imeni Lenina Lysychansk/Verkhniy (1938 {1}), Stakhanovets Lysychasnk (1938 {1}), **Stal/Metalurh Voroshylovsk** (1938–1940, 1948–1952, 1955, 1958, 1959 {11}), Zenit Voroshilovgrad (1939 {1}), Dynamo Voroshilovgrad (1946 {1}), Khimik Rubizhne (1948, 1949, 1958, 1959 {4}), Shakhtar Krasnyi Luch (1948 {1}), Khimik Lysychansk/Verkhniy (1949 {1}), Trudovi Rezervy Voroshilovgrad (1950, 1951 {2}), Avanhard Luhansk/Voroshilovgrad (1954–1959 {6}), Shakhtar Brianka (1956–1959 {4}), Khimik Severodonetsk (1956–1959 {4}), Shakhtar Sverdlovsk (1957–1959 {3}), Shakhtar Krasnodon (1958 {1})
Mykolaiv Oblast (1937)	Mykolaiv (1936, 1952 {2}), Voznesensk (1937, 1938 {2}), Sudnobudivnyk-2 Mykolaiv (1937, 1939, 1940, 1946–1949 {7}), Dynamo Mykolaiv (1938, 1950 {2}), Budivelnyk Mykolaiv (1948, 1949, 1954–1957 {6}), Dynamo Voznesensk (1948, 1949 {2}), Mashynobudivnyk Mykolaiv (1948 {1}), DO Mykolaiv (1949 {1}), Chervonyi Prapor Mykolaiv (1951, 1952 {2}), Vodnyk Mykolaiv (1953 {1}), Avanhard Mykolaiv (1954–1956, 1958, 1959 {5}), Pervomaisk (1958, 1959 {2}), Torpedo Mykolaiv (1958 {1}), Avanhard Voznesensk (1959 {1})
Odesa Oblast (1932)	Kirovohrad/Kirovo (1936–1938 {2}), z-d KinAp Odesa (1936 {1}), Kharchovyk Odesa (1938, 1939 {2}), Dynamo Odesa (1946, 1949, 1950 {3}), Vodnyk Odesa (1947, 1949 {2}), Bilshovyk Odesa (1948 {1}), Torpedo Odesa (1948, 1949 {2}), Lokomotyv Kotovsk (1948, 1949 {2}), Lokomotyv Rozdilna (1949 {1}), Lokomotyv Odesa (1950 {1}), Kolhospnyk Ulyanovka (1951 {1}), Spartak Odesa (1951, 1952 {2}), Metalurh Odesa (1951, 1952, 1956 {3}), SKVO (SKA, ODO, DO) Odessa (1952, 1954–1959 {7}), Shakhtar Odesa (1953–1955 {3}), Avanhard Odesa (1958 {1}), Chervonohvardiets Odesa (1959 {1}), Vodnyk Izmail (1959 {1})
Poltava Oblast (1937)	Poltava (1936–1938 {3}), Kremenchuk (1936–1938 {3}), Spartak Poltava (1939, 1940, 1946, 1948, 1949 {5}), Dynamo Poltava (1947 {1}), Dzerzhynets Kremenchuk (1948, 1949 {2}), VVS Poltava (1948 {1}), **Lokomotyv Poltava** (1949–1955, 1957–1959 {10}), Kolhospnyk Karlivka (1951 {1}), Kolhospnyk Poltava (1955, 1956 {2}), Avanhard Kryukiv (1956–1959 {4}), Vahonobudivnyk Kremenchuk (1957 {1}), Sputnyk Poltava (1957 {1}), Kolhospnyk-2 Poltava (1959 {1})
Rivne Oblast (1939)	Dynamo Rovne (1946, 1953, 1954 {3}), Rovne (1947 {1}), Lokomotyv Rovne (1948–1952 {5}), Bilshovyk Zdolbuniv (1949 {1}), Urozhai Rovne (1955 {1}), Kolhospnyk Rovne (1956, 1957 {2}), Avanhard Zdolbuniv (1958 {1}), Kolhospnyk Hoshcha (1958 {1}), Spartak Dubno (1958 {1}), Avanhard Rovne (1959 {1})
Sumy Oblast (1939)	Sumy (1936–1938 {3}), Shostka (1937 {1}), Konotop (1937, 1938, 1952 {3}), Tsukrovyk Sumy (1939, 1940 {2}), Dynamo Sumy (1946–1948 {3}), Mashynobudivnyk Sumy (1948, 1949, 1951, 1952 {4}), Khimik Shostka (1948, 1949, 1957 {3}), Lokomotyv Konotop (1948, 1949 {2}), Spartak Sumy (1949 {1}), Torpedo Sumy (1953–1959 {7}), Shakhtar Konotop (1958, 1959 {2}), Avanhard Shostka (1958, 1959 {2}), Avanhard Sumy (1959 {1})
Ternopil Oblast (1939)	Lokomotyv Ternopil (1946–1950 {5}), Bilshovyk Kremenets (1948 {1}), Dynamo Ternopil (1952–1957 {6}), Avanhard Ternopil (1958 {1}), Chortkiv (1959 {1})
Vinnytsia Oblast (1932)	Vinnytsia (1936, 1956–1958 {4}), Mohyliv-Podilskyi (1936–1938 {3}), Spartak Vinnytsia (1937, 1940, 1946 {3}), Koziatyn (1937, 1938 {2}), Temp Vinnytsia (1938 {1}), Dynamo Vinnytsia (1947–1952 {6}), DO Vinnytsia (1948, 1949 {2}), Lokomotyv Zhmerynka (1949, 1958 {2}), Kolhospnyk Mohyliv-Podilskyi (1951 {1}), Trud Vinnytsia (1953, 1954 {2}), Burevisnyk Vinnytsia (1955 {1}), Avanhard Mohyliv-Podilskyi (1958, 1959 {2}), Avanhard Vinnytsia (1959 {1})
Volyn Oblast (1939)	**Dynamo Lutsk** (1946–1956 {11}), DO Volodymyr-Volynskyi (1948 {1}), GDO Lutsk (1957–1959 {3}), Shakhtar Novovolynsk (1957–1959 {3}), Volodymyr-Volynskyi (1959 {1})
Zakarpattia Oblast (1945)	Spartak Uzhhorod (1946, 1950, 1952, 1953 {4}), Bilshovyk Mukachevo (1947, 1950 {2}), Dynamo Uzhhorod (1948, 1949 {2}), Bilshovyk Solotvyno (1948 {1}), Dynamo Mukachevo (1949 {1}), Bilshovyk Berehovo (1949 {1}), Kolhospnyk Berehovo (1951, 1952, 1954–1959 {8}), Iskra Mukachevo (1951–1954 {4}), Burevisnyk Mukachevo (1955, 1956 {2}), Burevisnyk Vynohradiv (1956 {1}), Avanhard Uzhhorod (1958, 1959 {2}), Avanhard Vynohradiv (1958, 1959 {2}), Avanhard Mukachevo (1958, 1959 {2})
Zaporizhzhia Oblast (1939)	Zaporizhia (1936, 1955 {2}), Melitopol (1936–1938 {3}), Berdiansk (1937, 1938 {2}), Kryla Rad Zaporizhia (1937–1939 {3}), Lokomotyv Zaporizhia (1939, 1940, 1947, 1948, 1950–1952 {7}), Bilshovyk Zaporizhia (1946 {1}), Torpedo Osypenko (1948, 1957 {2}), Stal/Metalurh Zaporizhia (1948, 1950–1952 {4}), Sudnobudivnyk Velykyi Tokmak (1948, 1949 {2}), Mashynobudivnyk Melitopol (1948 {1}), Burevisnyk Zaporizhia (1948 {1}), Trudovi Rezervy Melitopol (1949 {1}), Traktor Osypenko (1949 {1}), Enerhia Zaporizhia (1949 {1}), Mashynobudivnyk Zaporizhia (1953, 1954, 1956–1959 {6}), Enerhia Osypenko (1955, 1956 {2}), Khimik Zaporizhia (1955 {1}), Kolhospnyk Melitopol (1957 {1}), Avanhard Velykyi Tokmak (1958, 1959 {2}), Budivelnyk Zaporizhzhia (1958, 1959 {2}), Burevisnyk Melitopol (1958, 1959 {2}), Avanhard Berdiansk (1958, 1959 {2})
Zhytomyr Oblast (1938)	Voskhod Zhytomyr (1939 {1}), Dynamo Zhytomyr (1940, 1946–1950, 1952, 1953, 1955 {9}), Spartak Zhytomyr (1948, 1949, 1951 {3}), DO Zhytomyr (1948, 1949 {2}), Mashynobudivnyk Berdychiv (1948, 1949 {2}), v/c Berdychiv (1948 {1}), Chervona Prapor Malyn (1949 {1}), Chervona Zirka Malyn (1957 {1}), Kolhospnyk Zhytomyr (1957 {1}), Shakhtar Korostyshiv (1958, 1959 {2}), Avanhard Zhytomyr (1958 {1}), Avanhard Malyn (1959 {1})

Region	Teams
Crimea	**Chaika (Atlantyka, Volna, Avanhard) Sevastopol** (1964–1967, 1970–1991 {26}), **Okean (Avanhard, Metalurh) Kerch** (1963–1968, 1979–1991 {19}), **Tavria (Avanhard) Simferopol** (1960–1965, 1970–1973, 1985–1987 {13}), **SKCF (SCF) Sevastopol*** (1960–1967, 1969, 1970 {10})
Cherkasy Oblast	**Dnipro* (Hranit, Kolhospnyk) Cherkasy** (1960–1971, 1974, 1977–1984, 1988–1991 {25})
Chernihiv Oblast	**Desna Chernihiv** (1960–1968, 1970, 1977–1988, 1990, 1991 {24}), Chernihiv (1972–1976 {5})
Chernivtsi Oblast	**Bukovyna (Avanhard) Chernivtsi** (1960–1968, 1970–1989 {29})
Dnipropetrovsk Oblast	**Kryvbas (Hirnyk, Avanhard) Kryvyi Rih** (1960–1967, 1970, 1971, 1973–1976, 1978–1991 {28}), **Prometei (Dniprovets, Khimik) Dniprodzerzhynsk*** (1960–1970 {11}), **Shakhtar Pavlohrad (Kolos Mezhyrich)** (1981–1991 {11}), Avanhard Zhovti Vody* (1960–1966, 1969, 1970 {9}), Trubnyk Nikopol* (1962–1970 {9}), Kolos Nikopol (1976–1979, 1989–1991 {7}), Metalurh Dniprodzerzhynsk (1979–1985 {7}), Stal (Dnipro, Metalurh) Dnipropetrovsk (1960–1962, 1967 {4}), Lokomotyv Dnipropetrovsk (1968, 1969 {2})
Donetsk Oblast	**Shakhtar (Vuhlyk) Horlivka** (1960–1973, 1976–1988 {27}), **Novator (Lokomotyv, Metalurh, Azovets, Azovstal, Avanhard) Mariupol** (1960–1964, 1966, 1967, 1970–1973, 1975–1989 {26}), **Lokomotyv Donetsk*** (1960–1973 {14}), **Avanhard Kramatorsk*** (1960–1970 {11}), Shakhtar (Avanhard*) Makiivka (1966–1970, 1972, 1973 {7}), Shakhtar Torez* (1965–1970 {6}), Industria Yenakieve (1963, 1964, 1968, 1969 {4}), Sitall Kostiantynivka (1966–1969 {4}), Shakhtar Yenakieve (1965–1967 {3}), Start Dzerzhynsk (1967–1969 {3}), Uholyok Krasnoarmiisk (1968, 1969 {2})
Ivano-Frankivsk Oblast	**Prykarpattia (Spartak) Ivano-Frankivsk** (1960–1972, 1982–1991 {23})
Kharkiv Oblast	**Mayak Kharkiv** (1972, 1982–1991 {11}), **Torpedo Kharkiv** (1960–1969 {10}), Metalist Kharkiv (1974, 1976–1978 {4})
Kherson Oblast	**Krystal (Lokomotyv, Budivelnyk, Mayak) Kherson** (1961–1967, 1970–1991 {29}), Enerhia Nova Kakhovka* (1967–1970 {4}), Spartak Kherson (1960 {1})
Khmelnytskyi Oblast	**Podillia (Khvylia, Dynamo*) Khmelnytskyi** (1960–1968, 1970–1991 {31}), Podillia Kamianets-Podilskyi* (1968–1970 {3}), Temp Shepetivka (1991 {1})
Kyiv City	**SKA Kiev** (1961–1965, 1971, 1977–1980, 1983–1987, 1990, 1991 {16}), Arsenal Kyiv (1960–1963 {4}), Temp Kyiv (1964 {1}), Dynamo-2 Kyiv (1965 {1})
Kyiv Oblast	Dynamo Bila Tserkva (Irpin) (1984–1991 {8})
Kirovohrad Oblast	**Zirka (Dynamo) Kirovohrad** (1960–1965, 1970–1991 {28}), Shakhtar Oleksandria* (1962–1970 {9})
Lviv Oblast	**SKA Lvov** (1960–1965, 1970, 1971, 1977–1981 {13}), **Naftovyk Drohobych*** (1960–1970 {11}), Shakhtar Chervonohrad* (1968–1970 {3}), Karpaty Kamianka-Buzka (1991 {1})
Luhansk Oblast	**Vahonobudivnyk (Stakhanovets) Stakhanov (Shakhtar Kadiivka)** (1960–1968, 1970–1973, 1980–1986, 1991 {21}), **Khimik Severodonetsk*** (1960–1967, 1970–1973, 1991 {13}), Komunarets (Metalurh) Komunarsk* (1963–1970 {8}), Shakhtar Krasnyi Luch* (1965–1970 {6}), Trudovi Rezervy Voroshilovgrad (1960–1962 {3}), Avanhard Rovenky* (1968–1970 {3}), Shakhtar Sverdlovsk* (1968–1970 {3}), Zorya Luhansk (1985, 1986, 1989 {3}), Avanhard Antratsyt* (1969, 1970 {2}), Shakhtar Kirovsk* (1970 {1}), Stal Alchevsk (1991 {1})
Mykolaiv Oblast	**Sudnobudivnyk Mykolaiv** (1960–1965, 1970–1990 {27}), Budivelnyk Pervomaisk (1969 {1}), Mayak Ochakiv (1991 {1})
Odesa Oblast	**SKA Odessa** (1960–1963, 1970, 1971, 1976, 1977, 1983–1989 {15}), Dunaets Izmail (1964–1969 {6}), Chornomorets Odesa (1960–1962 {3}), Avtomobilist Odesa (1965, 1966 {2})
Poltava Oblast	**Vorskla (Kolos, Budivelnyk, Kolhospnyk) Poltava** (1960–1967, 1970–1982, 1987–1989 {24}), Dnipro Kremenchuk (1963–1967, 1969 {6}), Kremin Kremenchuk (1989 {1})
Rivne Oblast	**Veres (Avanhard, Horyn*, Kolhospnyk) Rivno** (1960–1991 {32})
Sumy Oblast	**Frunzenets (Spartak, Avanhard) Sumy** (1960–1983 {24}), Naftovyk Okhtyrka (1986–1991 {6}), Avtomobilist Sumy (1991 {1})
Ternopil Oblast	**Budivelnyk (Avanhard) Ternopil** (1960–1968, 1970–1974 {14}), Nyva Ternopil (Berezhany) (1983–1989 {7})
Vinnytsia Oblast	**Nyva (Lokomotyv*) Vinnytsia** (1960–1964, 1970–1989 {25})
Volyn Oblast	**Volyn (Torpedo*) Lutsk** (1960–1971, 1977–1989 {25}), Lutsk (1972–1976 {5}), Shakhtar Novovolynsk (1968 {1})
Zakarpattia Oblast	**Zakarpattia (Hoverla, Verkhovyna*, Spartak) Uzhhorod** (1960–1989, 1991 {31}), Pryladyst (Karpaty*) Mukachevo (1968–1970, 1991 {4})
Zaporizhzhia Oblast	Torpedo Zaporizhzhia (1985–1990 {6}), Torpedo Berdiansk* (1966–1970 {5}), Metalurh Zaporizhzhia (1960–1962, 1970 {4}), Spartak (Burevisnyk) Melitopol (1963–1966 {4}), Kolos Yakymivka (1968, 1969 {2})
Zhytomyr Oblast	**Polissia (Spartak, Avtomobilist) Zhytomyr** (1960–1967, 1970–1991 {30}), Prohres Berdychiv (1968, 1969 {2})

=== Teams from other republics ===
==== Moldavian teams ====
- Avtomobilist Tiraspol (previously as Start, Luceafărul) (1964, 1965, 1967–1969, 1974, 1975, 1978, 1979)
- Nistrul (Pischevik) Bendery (1964, 1965, 1968, 1969, 1974)
- FC Stroitel Beltsy (1964, 1965, 1967–1969)
- Tiraspol (1937)
- Pischevik Tiraspol (1938)
- Spartak Kishenev (1946)
- Speranța Drochia (1977)

==== Belarusian teams ====
- FC Neman Grodno (1964, 1965, 1970)
- Spartak Brest (1964, 1965, 1970)
- FC Dvina Vitebsk (1964, 1965)
- Spartak Mogilev (1964, 1965)
- Gomselmash Gomel (1970)

==== Russian teams ====
- FC Baltika Kaliningrad (1970)

=== Ukrainian teams of masters ===
Region	Teams
Crimea	SKCF/DOF Sevastopol (1954, 1955, 1957–1970 {16}), **Tavria/Avanhard Simferopol** (1958–1991 {34}), **Okean/Avanhard/Metalurh Kerch** (1963–1969, 1979–1991 {20}), **Atlantyka/Avanhard/Chaika Sevastopol/Balaklava** (1964–1967, 1971–1991 {25})
Cherkasy Oblast	**Hranit/Dnipro/Kolhospnyk Cherkasy** (1958–1971, 1974, 1977–1984, 1988–1991 {27})
Chernihiv Oblast	**Desna Chernihiv** (1960–1970, 1977–1991 {26})
Chernivtsi Oblast	Dynamo Chernivtsi (1949 {1}), **Bukovyna/Avanhard Chernivtsi** (1960–1991 {32})
Dnipropetrovsk Oblast	Dynamo Dnipropetrovsk (1936–1937 {3}), Stal Dnipropetrovsk (1936s, 1936f, 1967 {3}), **Dnipro/Metalurh/Stal Dnipropetrovsk** (1937, 1939, 1946–1949, 1953–1991 {45}), Lokomotyv Dnipropetrovsk (1937, 1968, 1969 {3}), Prometei/Dniprovets/Khimik Dniprodzerzhynsk (1957–1970 {14}), **Kryvbas/Hirnyk/Avanhard Kryvyi Rih** (1959–1991 {33}), Avanhard Zhovti Vody (1960–1970 {11}), Trubnyk Nikopol (1962–1970 {9}), Kolos Nikopol (1976–1991 {16}), Metalurh Dniprodzerzhynsk (1979–1985 {7}), Shakhtar/Kolos Pavlohrad/Mezhyrich (1981–1991 {11})
Donetsk Oblast	**Shakhtar/Stakhanovets Donetsk/Stalino** (1936–1940, ~~1941,~~ 1945–1991 {53}), z-d imeni Frunze Konstiantynivka (1936f, 1937 {2}), Avanhard Kramatorsk (1948, 1949, 1960–1970 {13}), Lokomotyv Donetsk/Stalino (1958–1973 {16}), **Vuhlyk/Shakhtar Horlivka** (1959–1973, 1976–1988 {28}), **Novator/Lokomotyv/Metalurh/Azovets/Azovstal Mariupol/Zhdanov** (1960–1964, 1966–1973, 1975–1989 {28}), Industria/Metalurh Yenakieve (1963, 1964, 1968, 1969 {4}), Shakhtar Torez (1965–1970 {6}), Shakhtar Yenakieve (1965–1967 {3}), Avanhard Makiivka (1966–1970 {5}), Start Dzerzhynsk (1966–1969 {4}), Sitall Kostiantynivka (1967–1969 {3}), Uholyok/Komunarets Krasnoarmiysk (1968, 1969 {2}), Shakhtar Makiivka (1972, 1973 {2})
Ivano-Frankivsk Oblast	**Prykarpattia/Spartak Ivano-Frankivsk/Stanislav** (1956–1991 {36})
Kharkiv Oblast	Dynamo Kharkiv (1936–1937, 1939, 1940 {5}), Silmash Kharkiv (1936f–1940 {5}), Spartak Kharkiv (1936–1939, ~~1941~~ {5}), Torpedo/Traktor Kharkiv (1936–1937, 1949, 1960–1969 {14}), Lokomotyv Kharkiv (1945–1955 {11}), **Metalist/Avanhard/Dzerzhynets Kharkiv** (1947–1949, 1956–1991 {39}), Mayak Kharkiv (1972, 1982–1991 {11})
Kherson Oblast	Spartak Kherson (1947–1949, 1958–1960 {6}), **Krystal/Lokomotyv/Budivelnyk/Mayak Kherson** (1961–1991 {31}), Enerhia Nova Kakhovka (1967–1970 {4})
Khmelnytskyi Oblast	**Podillia/Khvylia/Dynamo Khmelnytskyi** (1960–1991 {32}), Podillia Kamianets-Podilskyi (1968–1970 {3}), Temp Shepetivka (1991 {1})
Kyiv City	**Dynamo** (1936–1940, ~~1941,~~ 1945–1991 {53}), Lokomotyv (1936–1940 {6}), Spartak (1937, 1949 {2}), **SKA/ODO (SC Chernigov)** (1947–1949, 1952, 1954–1958, 1961–1987, 1990, 1991 {38}), Arsenal (1959–1963 {5}), Temp (1964 {1}), Dynamo-2 (1965 {1})
Kyiv Oblast	Dynamo Bila Tserkva/Irpin (1984–1991 {8})
Kirovohrad Oblast	**Zirka Kirovohrad** (1958–1961, 1963–1991 {33}), Dynamo Kirovohrad (1962 {1}), Shakhtar Oleksandria (1962–1970 {9})
Lviv Oblast	Spartak Lviv (1947–1949 {3}), **SKA(-Karpaty)/DO Lviv (SC Lutsk)** (1949, 1954–1989 {37}), Naftovyk Drohobych (1960–1970 {11}), **Karpaty Lviv** (1963–1981, 1989–1991 {22}), Shakhtar Chervonohrad (1968–1970 {3}), Halychyna Drohobych (1990, 1991 {2}), Karpaty Kamianka-Buzka (1991 {1})
Luhansk Oblast	**Zorya/Dzerzhynets Luhansk/Voroshylovhrad** (1939, 1964–1991 {29}), Dinamo Voroshylovhrad (1947–1949 {3}), **Vahonobudivnyk/Stakhanovets/Shakhtar Stakhanov/Kadiivka** (1948, 1949, 1957–1973, 1980–1986, 1991 {27}), Trudovi Rezervy Luhansk/Voroshylovhrad (1949, 1957–1963 {8}), Khimik Severodonetsk (1960–1973, 1991 {15}), Komunarets/Metalurh Komunarsk (1963–1970 {8}), Shakhtar Krasnyi Luch (1965–1970 {6}), Avanhard Rovenky (1968–1970 {3}), Shakhtar Sverdlovsk (1968–1970 {3}), Avanhard Antratsyt (1969, 1970 {2}), Shakhtar Kirovsk (1970 {1}), Stal Alchevsk/Komunarsk (1991 {1})
Mykolaiv Oblast	**Sudnobudivnyk/Avanhard Mykolaiv** (1937, 1939, 1940, 1946–1949, 1957–1991 {42}), Budivelnyk Pervomaisk (1969 {1}), Mayak Ochakiv (1991 {1})
Odesa Oblast	Dynamo Odesa (1936–1939 {5}), **Chornomorets/Pischevik Odesa** (1940, 1945–1950, 1955–1991 {44}), Spartak Odesa (~~1941~~), Metalurh Odesa (1953, 1954 {2}), **SKA Odesa (Zvezda Tiraspol) (1958–1991 {34})**, Dunayets Izmail (1964–1969 {6}), Avtomobilist Odesa (1965, 1966 {2})
Poltava Oblast	**Vorskla/Budivelnyk/Silbud/Kolos/Kolhospnyk Poltava** (1957–1982, 1987–1991 {31}), Kremin/Dnipro Kremenchuk (1963–1969, 1989–1991 {10})
Rivne Oblast	**Veres/Avanhard/Horyn/Kolhospnyk Rivne** (1958–1991 {34})
Sumy Oblast	**Frunzenets/Spartak/Avanhard Sumy** (1960–1983 {24}), Naftovyk Okhtyrka (1986–1991 {6}), Avtomobilist Sumy (1991 {1})
Ternopil Oblast	Budivelnyk/Avanhard Ternopil (1959–1974 {16}), Nyva Ternopil/Berezhany (1983–1991 {9})
Vinnytsia Oblast	**Nyva/Lokomotyv Vinnytsia** (1958–1991 {34})
Volyn Oblast	**Torpedo/Volyn Lutsk** (1960–1971, 1977–1991 {27}), Shakhtar Novovolynsk (1968 {1})
Zakarpattia Oblast	**Zakarpattia/Hoverla/Verkhovyna/Spartak Uzhhorod** (1947–1949, 1951, 1954–1991 {42}), Pryladyst/Karpaty/Bolshevik Mukachevo (1948, 1949, 1968–1970, 1991 {6})
Zaporizhzhia Oblast	Bolshevik Zaporizhia (1947 {1}), Lokomotyv Zaporizhia (1948, 1949 {2}), **Metalurh Zaporizhia** (1953–1991 {39}), Spartak/Burevisnyk Melitopol (1963–1966 {4}), Torpedo Berdiansk (1966–1970 {5}), Kolos Yakymivka (1968, 1969 {2}), Torpedo Zaporizhia (1985–1991 {7})
Zhytomyr Oblast	**Spartak/Avtomobilist/Polissia/Avanhard Zhytomyr** (1959–1991 {33}), Prohres Berdychiv (1968, 1969 {2})

== See also ==
- Ukrainian Premier League
- Ukrainian First League
- Ukrainian Amateur Football Championship
- Football Cup of the Ukrainian SSR
- List of Ukrainian football champions
