= 1980 Soviet Second League, Zone 5 =

Football Championship of Ukrainian SSR
- Season: 1980
- Champions: SKA Kiev
- Promoted: SKA Kiev
- Relegated: none
- Top goalscorer: 25 - Volodymyr Chyrkov (Avanhard)

1980 Football Championship of Ukrainian SSR was the 50th season of association football competition of the Ukrainian SSR, which was part of the Soviet Second League in Zone 5. The season started on 5 April 1981. This season the Soviet Second League went through minor reorganization and Ukrainian Championship was moved from the Zone 2 to Zone 5. The Moldavian Avtomobilist Tiraspol was removed from the competition and placed in different zone.

The 1980 Football Championship of Ukrainian SSR was won by SKA Kiev. Qualified for the interzonal playoffs, the team from Kiev managed to gain promotion by placing first in its group.

The "Ruby Cup" of Molod Ukrayiny newspaper (for the most scored goals) was received by SKA Kiev.

== Teams ==
=== Location map ===
Locations of teams in Second League, Zone 5

=== Promoted teams ===
- Stakhanovets Stakhanov – Champion of the Fitness clubs competitions (KFK) (debut)

=== Renamed teams ===
- Stakhanovets Stakhanov was called Shakhtar Stakhanov

=== Realigned teams ===
- Avtomobilist Tiraspol was moved to Zone VIII

== Final standings ==
| Pos | Team | Pld | W | D | L | GF | GA | GD | Pts | Qualification or relegation |
|---|---|---|---|---|---|---|---|---|---|---|
| 1 | SKA Kiev (C, Q) | 44 | 28 | 9 | 7 | 83 | 33 | +50 | 65 | Qualified for interzonal competitions among other Zone winners |
| 2 | Bukovyna Chernivtsi | 44 | 26 | 9 | 9 | 70 | 35 | +35 | 61 | |
| 3 | SKA Lviv | 44 | 24 | 12 | 8 | 64 | 32 | +32 | 60 | |
| 4 | Avanhard Rivne | 44 | 22 | 15 | 7 | 54 | 30 | +24 | 59 | |
| 5 | Sudnobudivnyk Mykolaiv | 44 | 22 | 11 | 11 | 54 | 27 | +27 | 55 | |
| 6 | Zirka Kirovohrad | 44 | 20 | 13 | 11 | 52 | 44 | +8 | 53 | |
| 7 | Spartak Zhytomyr | 44 | 17 | 17 | 10 | 55 | 43 | +12 | 51 | |
| 8 | Desna Chernihiv | 44 | 18 | 13 | 13 | 50 | 29 | +21 | 49 | |
| 9 | Atlantyka Sevastopol | 44 | 18 | 11 | 15 | 53 | 49 | +4 | 47 | |
| 10 | Kryvbas Kryvyi Rih | 44 | 16 | 15 | 13 | 55 | 47 | +8 | 47 | |
| 11 | Krystal Kherson | 44 | 15 | 16 | 13 | 37 | 37 | 0 | 46 | |
| 12 | Frunzenets Sumy | 44 | 13 | 18 | 13 | 46 | 39 | +7 | 44 | |
| 13 | Nyva Vinnytsia | 44 | 17 | 8 | 19 | 50 | 46 | +4 | 42 | |
| 14 | Okean Kerch | 44 | 13 | 12 | 19 | 40 | 49 | −9 | 38 | |
| 15 | Hoverla Uzhhorod | 44 | 12 | 14 | 18 | 38 | 44 | −6 | 38 | |
| 16 | Podillia Khmelnytskyi | 44 | 13 | 9 | 22 | 32 | 64 | −32 | 35 | |
| 17 | Dnipro Cherkasy | 44 | 13 | 9 | 22 | 43 | 50 | −7 | 35 | |
| 18 | Metalurh Dniprodzerzhynsk | 44 | 11 | 11 | 22 | 47 | 58 | −11 | 33 | |
| 19 | Novator Zhdanov | 44 | 11 | 11 | 22 | 38 | 62 | −24 | 33 | |
| 20 | Torpedo Lutsk | 44 | 9 | 14 | 21 | 43 | 76 | −33 | 32 | |
| 21 | Kolos Poltava | 44 | 9 | 13 | 22 | 37 | 61 | −24 | 31 | |
| 22 | Stakhanovets Stakhanov | 44 | 11 | 8 | 25 | 22 | 56 | −34 | 30 | |
| 23 | Shakhtar Horlivka | 44 | 11 | 6 | 27 | 40 | 92 | −52 | 28 | Avoided relegation |

(C) Champions; (Q) Qualified for the phase indicated

== Top goalscorers ==
The following were the top ten goalscorers.

| # | Scorer | Goals (Pen.) | Team |
|---|---|---|---|
| 1 | Volodymyr Chyrkov | 25 | Avanhard Rivno |
| 2 | Ivan Hamaliy | 20 | SKA Lviv |
| 3 | Mykola Pinchuk | 19 | SKA Kiev |
| 4 | Viktor Nastashevsky | 18 | SKA Kiev |
| 4 | Oleksandr Martyshov | 18 | Metalurh Dniprodzerzhynsk |
| 4 | Yuriy Kerman | 18 | Novator Zhdanov |
| 7 | Oleksandr Mykha | 17 | Atlantyka Sevastopol |
| 8 | Volodymyr Sakalov | 16 | Bukovyna Chernivtsi |

== See also ==
- Soviet Second League
