= 1971 Soviet Second League, Zone 1 =

Ukrainian football championship

Football Championship of Ukrainian SSR
- Season: 1971
- Champions: Kryvbas Kryvyi Rih
- Promoted: Kryvbas Kryvyi Rih
- Relegated: Dnipro Cherkasy, Torpedo Lutsk, SKA Odessa (transferred out)
- Top goalscorer: 21 – Stanislav Vovk (Kryvbas Kryvyi Rih)

The 1971 Football Championship of Ukrainian SSR was the 41st season of association football competition of the Ukrainian SSR, which was part of the Soviet Second League in Zone 1. It was the first season in the newly established Soviet Second League, after both Class A and Class B competitions were discontinued.

The season started on 3 April 1971.

The 1971 Football Championship of Ukrainian SSR was won by FC Kryvbas Kryvyi Rih.

== Reorganization ==
The division became a part of big football reform that took place in the Soviet Union and stretched over two years 1970–1971. Most of the club previously competed in the 1970 Class A Second Group (Zone 1) and were grandfathered into the newly established Second League (Zone 1). Clubs from other union republics (Belorussian SSR) were weeded out into other Zone. The lower tier Class B competition were completely disbanded with only eight teams allowed to advance to the Second League, thus replacing those club of other union republics.

== Teams ==
=== Location map ===
Locations of teams in Second League, Zone 6

=== Relegated teams ===
- SKA Kiev – (returning after five seasons)

=== Promoted teams ===
Eight clubs were promoted from the 1970 Class B (Ukrainian SSR).

- FC Khimik Severodonetsk
- FC Lokomotyv Vinnytsia
- FC Lokomotyv Donetsk
- FC Dynamo Khmelnytskyi
- FC Verkhovyna Uzhhorod
- FC Torpedo Lutsk
- FC Horyn Rovno
- FC Dnipro Cherkasy

=== Relocated and renamed teams ===
- FC Azovets Zhdanov changed its name to FC Metalurh Zhdanov.
- FC Spartak Sumy changed its name to FC Frunzenets Sumy.
- FC Verkhovyna Uzhhorod changed its name to FC Hoverla Uzhhorod.

== Final standings ==
Pos	Team	Pld	W	D	L	GF	GA	GD	Pts	Qualification or relegation
1	Kryvbas Kryvyi Rih (C, Q)	50	31	10	9	78	32	+46	72	Promotion qualification (Note: Kryvbas qualified for the play off with the third team that placed third in final tournament. After winning the play off, Kryvbas was promoted.)
2	Sudnobudivnyk Mykolaiv	50	30	11	9	69	31	+38	71	
3	Avtomobilist Zhytomyr	50	25	15	10	58	30	+28	65	
4	Shakhtar Kadiivka	50	24	15	11	67	34	+33	63	
5	Tavriya Simferopol	50	24	11	15	79	50	+29	59	
6	Zirka Kirovohrad	50	21	17	12	52	33	+19	59	
7	Lokomotyv Vinnytsia	50	17	22	11	47	35	+12	56	
8	Budivelnyk Poltava	50	21	13	16	54	43	+11	55	
9	Shakhtar Horlivka	50	17	20	13	50	50	0	54	
10	Khimik Severodonetsk	50	19	15	16	66	61	+5	53	
11	Metalurh Zhdanov	50	18	15	17	62	55	+7	51	
12	SKA Odessa	50	18	15	17	50	48	+2	51	
13	Lokomotyv Kherson	50	18	14	18	46	53	−7	50	
14	Avanhard Ternopil	50	18	13	19	43	46	−3	49	
15	Frunzenets Sumy	50	15	18	17	42	43	−1	48	
16	Bukovyna Chernivtsi	50	17	14	19	35	38	−3	48	
17	SKA Kiev	50	15	17	18	43	44	−1	47	
18	Dynamo Khmelnytskyi	50	15	16	19	35	45	−10	46	
19	Spartak Ivano-Frankivsk	50	18	9	23	46	46	0	45	
20	Hoverla Uzhhorod	50	15	15	20	42	55	−13	45	
21	Avanhard Sevastopol	50	14	17	19	37	54	−17	45	
22	Lokomotyv Donetsk	50	12	16	22	40	62	−22	40	
23	SKA Lviv	50	10	17	23	33	55	−22	37	Reformed (Note: According to the season's regulations two bottom teams had to be relegated including Torpedo Lutsk and Horyn Rovno, but the Football Federation of Ukrainian SSR, considering the loss of professional team in two adjacent oblasts in western Ukraine, adopted a decision to leave teams of both cities in the Second League. However, in 1972 on a basis of the Lutsk city team, there was formed professional team of the Carpathian Military District and created SC Lutsk. At the same time, the original professional team of the Carpathian Military District SKA Lviv was merged with the newly formed SC Lutsk. Moreover, other two army sports clubs of Ukrainian competitions, SKA Kiev and SKA Odessa, moved next year to other cities.)
24	Dnipro Cherkasy	50	9	15	26	28	69	−41	33	Relegated
25	Torpedo Lutsk	50	7	16	27	21	66	−45	30	Reformed
26	Horyn Rovno	50	9	10	31	27	72	−45	28	

(C) Champions; (Q) Qualified for the phase indicated

== Top goalscorers ==
The following were the top goalscorers.

#	Scorer	Goals (Pen.)	Team
1	Stanislav Vovk	21	Kryvbas Kryvyi Rih
2	Valentyn Prylepskyi	20	Tavriya Simferopol
2	Yevhen Dereviaha	20	Sudnobudivnyk Mykolaiv
4	Yevhen Satayev	19	Sudnobudivnyk Mykolaiv
4	Vladyslav Nechai	19	Khimik Severodonetsk
6	Volodymyr Tovchykh	17	Kryvbas Kryvyi Rih
7	Yuriy Nesmiyan	16	Avtomobilist Zhytomyr
7	Andriy Cheremysin	16	Tavriya Simferopol
7	Oleksiy Katsman	16	Zirka Kirovohrad
10	Vitaliy Starukhin	15	Budivelnyk Poltava

== See also ==
- Soviet Second League
