= 1977 Soviet Second League, Zone 2 =

Football Championship of Ukrainian SSR
- Season: 1977
- Champions: SKA Odessa
- Promoted: SKA Odessa
- Relegated: none
- Top goalscorer: 20 – Mykola Pinchuk (SKA Kiev); Serhiy Shmundyak (SKA Lviv)

The 1977 Football Championship of Ukrainian SSR was the 47th season of association football competition of the Ukrainian SSR, which was part of the Soviet Second League in Zone 2. The season started on 3 April 1977.

The 1977 Football Championship of Ukrainian SSR was won by SKA Odessa.

The "Ruby Cup" of Molod Ukrayiny newspaper (for the most scored goals) was received by SKA Odessa.

== Teams ==
=== Location map ===
Locations of teams in Second League, Zone 2

=== Relegated teams ===
- none

=== Promoted and admitted teams ===
- FC Desna Chernihiv – (returning after six seasons; replaced the promoted FC Khimik Chernihiv)
- FC Torpedo Lutsk – (returning after four seasons; reinstated and admitted)
- FC Dnipro Cherkasy – (returning after three seasons; reinstated and admitted)

=== Relocated and renamed teams ===
- SC Chernihiv was moved back to Kiev and changed its name to SKA Kiev.
- SC Lutsk was moved back to Lviv and changed its name to SKA Lviv.
- FC Speranța Drochia was moved from the Zone 1 (Soviet republics) to the Zone 2 (Ukraine).
- FC Avtomobilist Zhytomyr changed its name to FC Spartak Zhytomyr.

== Final standings ==
Pos	Team	Pld	W	D	L	GF	GA	GD	Pts	Promotion or relegation
1	SKA Odessa (C, P)	44	31	6	7	85	31	+54	68	Promoted
2	SKA Kiev	44	26	11	7	63	32	+31	63	
3	Kolos Nikopol	44	25	12	7	72	35	+37	62	
4	Metalist Kharkiv	44	22	16	6	59	24	+35	60	
5	Zirka Kirovohrad	44	21	15	8	52	27	+25	57	
6	Hoverla Uzhhorod	44	20	15	9	51	32	+19	55	
7	Krystal Kherson	44	20	12	12	54	40	+14	52	
8	Spartak Zhytomyr	44	18	14	12	51	34	+17	50	
9	Bukovyna Chernivtsi	44	19	11	14	46	29	+17	49	
10	SKA Lviv	44	16	16	12	61	43	+18	48	
11	Sudnobudivnyk Mykolaiv	44	16	13	15	55	52	+3	45	
12	Novator Zhdanov	44	17	10	17	53	57	−4	44	
13	Atlantyka Sevastopol	44	15	11	18	49	46	+3	41	
14	Desna Chernihiv	44	11	16	17	34	42	−8	38	
15	Lokomotyv Vinnytsia	44	14	8	22	47	70	−23	36	
16	Khvylya Khmelnytskyi	44	10	15	19	33	50	−17	35	
17	Frunzenets Sumy	44	13	7	24	35	56	−21	33	
18	Speranța Drochia	44	12	9	23	43	73	−30	33	Moldavian SSR
19	Torpedo Lutsk	44	12	8	24	35	70	−35	32	
20	Avanhard Rovno	44	8	14	22	31	64	−33	30	
21	Kolos Poltava	44	10	8	26	36	64	−28	28	
22	Shakhtar Horlivka	44	9	9	26	32	63	−31	27	
23	Dnipro Cherkasy	44	8	10	26	26	69	−43	26	Avoided relegation

(C) Champions; (P) Promoted

== Top goalscorers ==
The following were the top ten goalscorers.

#	Scorer	Goals (Pen.)	Team
1	Mykola Pinchuk	20	SKA Kiev
1	Serhiy Shmundyak	20	SKA Lviv
3	Oleksandr Dovbiy	18	SKA Kiev
4	Volodymyr Naumenko	16	Atlantyka Sevastopol
5	Anatoliy Doroshenko	14	SKA Odessa
5	Ihor Ivanenko	14	SKA Odessa
5	Stanislav Bernykov	14	Metalist Kharkiv
5	Nodar Bachiashvili	14	Torpedo Lutsk

== See also ==
- Soviet Second League
