= Andriy Karimov =

Soviet footballer and coach

Andrei Karimov
Personal information
- Full name: Andrei Usmanovich Karimov
- Date of birth: 30 July 1943
- Place of birth: Chelyabinsk, Russian SFSR, Soviet Union
- Date of death: 18 June 2017 (aged 73)
- Place of death: Lviv, Ukraine
- Position: Defender

Youth career
- Leningrad

Senior career*
Years	Team	Apps	(Gls)
1962–1964	FC Zenit Leningrad		
1965–1971	SKA Lvov	109	(0)
1972–1973	FC Bukovyna Chernivtsi		
1974	FC Sokil Lviv		
1974–1979	Chojnowianka Chojnów	0	(0)

Managerial career
- 1980–1980s: Sports school Karpaty Lviv
- 1986: SKA Lvov (ass't)
- 1987: SKA Lvov
- 1989: SKA Lvov
- 1992–1993: FC Skala Stryi
- 1994–1995: FC Halychyna Drohobych
- 1999–2001: FC Karpaty Lviv (ass't)
- * Club domestic league appearances and goals

Andrei Karimov (Ukrainian: Андрій Усманович Карімов; 30 July 1943 – 18 June 2017) is a former professional Soviet football defender and coach. He is better known for his playing and coaching career for the Soviet army team SKA Lvov.

== Career ==
Being born in Chelyabinsk, Karimov started his youth football career in Leningrad. In 1955 he joined Kirovets Leningrad which represented the Kirov Factory in Saint Petersburg (at that time Leningrad). Later until 1964 he played for various other Leningrad teams among which were FShM and Zenit. Eventually Karimov moved to Ukraine where he played for SKA Lvov. It was with this army team that he became the champion of Ukraine in 1965. The same year Karimov was honoured as master of sports in football. Among other clubs in his further playing career were FC Bukovyna Chernivtsi, FC Sokil Lviv, Chojnowianka Chojnów (Poland).

In 1980 Karimov retired as player and became a coach for the Karpaty sports school (SDYuShOR) in Lviv. Later he joined the coaching staff of Volodymyr Bulhakov at SKA Karpaty Lvov. During his coaching career, Karimov also worked in FC Skala Stryi, FC Halychyna Drohobych, and FC Lviv. In particular Andriy Karimov recollects his work in FC Karpaty Lviv during 1999 – 2001 when he assisted to Stepan Yurchyshyn and Lev Brovarsky. During that period Karpaty played in final of the Ukrainian Cup and played against Swedish Helsingborgs IF in the UEFA Cup.

Eventually Karimov returned to coach for the Karpaty sports school where he worked as a theoretic.

The Ukrainian football defender and native of Lviv Ihor Karimov is a son of Andriy Karimov.
