= 1963 Soviet Class B =

Soviet football league season

The 1963 Soviet Football Championship (Class B) was the thirteenth season since the creation of Class B in 1950 in place of the Vtoraya Gruppa. At the same time, in 1963 the Class B tournament was shifted one tier down in the Soviet league system. In this way, the third level competitions were revived for the first time since 1937.

The structure of the tournament was preserved, having separate competitions for Russia, Ukraine, and other Soviet republics.

== Russian SFSR ==
The Russian Republican competition consisted of five zones of twenty clubs. The top two teams from each zone advanced to the semi-final stage composed of two groups with five teams in each. The top two teams from those two groups advanced to the final stage with a single group of four.

The winner, Volga Kalinin, was promoted.

=== Semifinals ===
==== Grozny group ====
Pos	Team	Pld	W	D	L	GF	GA	GD	Pts
1	Volga Kalinin	4	4	0	0	10	1	+9	8
2	Dynamo Kirov	4	2	1	1	5	3	+2	5
3	Tekstilshchik Ivanovo	4	1	2	1	5	5	0	4
4	Irtysh Omsk	4	0	2	2	1	5	−4	2
5	Terek Grozny	4	0	1	3	2	9	−7	1

Source: RSSSF

==== Saratov group ====
Pos	Team	Pld	W	D	L	GF	GA	GD	Pts
1	Zvezda Serpukhov	4	1	3	0	3	1	+2	5
2	Zenit Izhevsk	4	2	1	1	3	3	0	5
3	Temp Barnaul	4	1	2	1	4	1	+3	4
4	Sokol Saratov	4	1	2	1	3	3	0	4
5	Tekstilshchik Kostroma	4	0	2	2	1	6	−5	2

Source: RSSSF

=== Finals ===
Pos	Team	Pld	W	D	L	GF	GA	GD	Pts
1	Volga Kalinin	3	2	1	0	7	3	+4	5
2	Dynamo Kirov	3	0	3	0	4	4	0	3
3	Zvezda Serpukhov	3	1	1	1	3	5	−2	3
4	Zenit Izhevsk	3	0	1	2	5	7	−2	1

Source: RSSSF

== Ukrainian SSR ==
The Ukrainian Republican competition consisted of two zones of twenty clubs. Upon conclusion of the league format, each club qualified for a playoff with another club that placed the same in the other group. The pair of the first placed clubs was sort of a republican championship playoff. The playoffs consisted of two legs– home and away. Teams were relegated or withdrawn and only one was promoted to the Subgroup A (the First League).

=== Play-offs ===
Each team played against the same ranking team from the other zone. Only the two top pairs concerning promotion are listed. No teams were relegated. SKA Odessa obtained the promotion from the Ukraine zone. They were classified as the Republican champions and were promoted to the Inter-Republican level, the Class A.

- FC Lokomotiv Vinnitsa - SKA Odessa 0:2 0:1
- FC Azovstal Zhdanov - SKA Lvov 0:0 1:0
- FC Zirka Kirovograd - FC Torpedo Kharkov 1:1 0:2
- FC Burevestnik Melitopol - FC Polesie Zhitomir 1:0 1:3
- FC Avangard Ternopol - FC Shakhter Gorlovka 1:1 0:0
- FC Kolgospnik Cherkassy - FC Khimik Severodonetsk 2:1 0:2
- FC Lokomotiv Donetsk - SKA Kiev 0:2 1:2
- FC Stroitel Kherson - FC Shakhter Kadeevka 3:2 0:2
- FC Dynamo Khmelnitskiy - FC Kolgospnik Poltava 5:1 0:1
- FC Arsenal Kiev - FC Dneprovets Dneprodzerzhinsk 3:2 1:2
- FC Desna Chernigov - FC Metallurg Kommunarsk 3:1 1:2
- SCF Sevastopol - FC Spartak Ivano-Frankovsk 2:1 1:4
- FC Verkhovina Uzhgorod - FC Trubnik Nikopol 0:0 1:2
- FC Avangard Zheltye Vody - FC Sudostroitel Nikolaev 1:1 1:0
- FC Avangard Chernovtsy - SC Tavriya Simferopol 6:0 0:1
- FC Avangard Kramatorsk - FC Shakhter Aleksandriya 1:1 0:2
- FC Volyn Lutsk - FC Gornyak Krivoy Rog 0:0 0:3
- FC Kolgospnik Rovno - FC Metallurg Yenakievo 3:1 2:2
- FC Metallurg Kerch - FC Neftyanik Drogobich 0:1 0:0
- FC Dnepr Kremenchug - FC Spartak Sumy 0:0 0:2

== Soviet Republics ==
Lokomotiv Tbilisi and Dynamo Tallinn were promoted.

== See also ==
- Soviet Second League
