= 1968 Ukrainian Class B =

Football Championship of Ukrainian SSR
- Season: 1968
- Champions: FC Avanhard Ternopil
- Promoted: FC Avanhard Ternopil; FC Bukovyna Chernivtsi; FC Shakhtar Kadiivka; FC Desna Chernihiv; FC Dynamo Khmelnytskyi
- Relegated: FC Shakhtar Novovolynsk

The 1968 Football Championship of Ukrainian SSR (Class B) was the 38th season of association football competition of the Ukrainian SSR, which was part of the Ukrainian Class B. It was the eighteenth in the Soviet Class B and the sixth season of the Ukrainian Class B.

The 1968 Football Championship of Ukrainian SSR (Class B) was won by FC Avanhard Ternopil.

== Zone 1 (West) ==
=== Location map ===
Locations of teams in Class B

=== Relegated teams ===
- none

=== Promoted teams ===
- FC Prohres Berdychiv
- FC Karpaty Mukacheve – (the Ukrainian KFK competitions)
- FC Nistrul Bendery – (Champion of the Moldavian KFK competitions)
- FC Shakhtar Chervonohrad
- FC Shakhtar Novovolynsk
- FC Podillia Kamianets-Podilskyi – (the Ukrainian KFK competitions)

=== Relocated and renamed teams ===
- FC Torpedo Lutsk previously known as FC Volyn Lutsk
- FC Stroiindustriya Beltsy previously known as FC Stroitel Beltsy
- FC Dnestr Tiraspol previously known as FC Energiya Tiraspol

=== Final standings ===
Pos	Team	Pld	W	D	L	GF	GA	GD	Pts	Qualification or relegation
1	FC Avanhard Ternopil	42	28	10	4	85	24	+61	66	Qualified for Final stage
2	FC Bukovyna Chernivtsi	42	25	10	7	66	26	+40	60	Qualified for Final stage
3	FC Dynamo Khmelnytskyi	42	21	12	9	59	19	+40	54	Qualified for Final stage
4	FC Shakhtar Oleksandriya	42	21	10	11	56	39	+17	52	Qualified for Final stage
5	FC Spartak Ivano-Frankivsk	42	19	13	10	59	29	+30	51	
6	FC Verkhovyna Uzhhorod	42	18	10	14	40	43	−3	46	
7	FC Horyn Rivne	42	14	17	11	35	25	+10	45	
8	FC Stroiindustriya Beltsy	42	14	17	11	37	37	0	45	
9	SC Prometei Dniprodzerzhynsk	42	15	14	13	48	39	+9	44	
10	FC Shakhtar Chervonohrad	42	14	16	12	33	30	+3	44	
11	FC Kolos Yakymivka	42	13	16	13	37	32	+5	42	
12	FC Torpedo Lutsk	42	15	11	16	31	40	−9	41	
13	FC Dnestr Tiraspol	42	13	14	15	44	38	+6	40	
14	FC Karpaty Mukacheve	42	14	11	17	36	47	−11	39	
15	FC Enerhiya Nova Kakhovka	42	12	14	16	32	39	−7	38	
16	FC Naftovyk Drohobych	42	15	8	19	36	53	−17	38	
17	FC Nistrul Bendery	42	13	11	18	32	53	−21	37	
18	FC Trubnyk Nikopol	42	12	12	18	42	42	0	36	
19	FC Prohres Berdychiv	42	12	11	19	40	64	−24	35	
20	FC Podillya Kamianets-Podilskyi	42	10	12	20	23	46	−23	32	
21	FC Dunayets Izmayil	42	7	8	27	18	63	−45	22	
22	FC Shakhtar Novovolynsk	42	5	7	30	19	80	−61	17	Relegated

== Zone 2 ==
=== Location map ===
Locations of teams in Class B
Locations of teams in Class B (Donetsk Oblast only)
Locations of teams in Class B (Luhansk Oblast only)

=== Relegated teams ===
- none

=== Promoted teams ===
- FC Avanhard Rovenky – (Champion of the Ukrainian KFK competitions)
- FC Ugolyok Krasnoarmiysk
- FC Shakhtar Sverdlovsk

=== Relocated and renamed teams ===
- FC Lokomotyv Dnipropetrovsk previously known as FC Stal Dnipropetrovsk
- FC Industriya Yenakieve previously known as FC Shakhtar Yenakieve

=== Final standings ===
Pos	Team	Pld	W	D	L	GF	GA	GD	Pts	Qualification
1	FC Lokomotyv Donetsk	40	24	11	5	73	29	+44	59	Qualified for Final stage
2	FC Spartak Sumy	40	21	14	5	48	22	+26	56	Qualified for Final stage
3	FC Desna Chernihiv	40	24	6	10	50	27	+23	54	Qualified for Final stage
4	FC Shakhtar Kadiivka	40	19	13	8	45	26	+19	51	Qualified for Final stage
5	FC Komunarets Komunarsk	40	19	12	9	49	29	+20	50	
6	FC Shakhtar Horlivka	40	19	11	10	47	30	+17	49	
7	FC Ugolyok Krasnoarmiysk	40	12	18	10	32	30	+2	42	
8	FC Avanhard Rovenky	40	14	14	12	36	35	+1	42	
9	FC Sitall Kostyantynivka	40	12	15	13	34	32	+2	39	
10	FC Avanhard Kramatorsk	40	13	13	14	43	43	0	39	
11	FC Torpedo Kharkiv	40	13	13	14	28	35	−7	39	
12	FC Avanhard Makiivka	40	15	8	17	34	37	−3	38	
13	FC Shakhtar Sverdlovsk	40	13	11	16	42	44	−2	37	
14	FC Torpedo Berdyansk	40	13	11	16	34	39	−5	37	
15	FC Lokomotyv Dnipropetrovsk	40	10	15	15	26	33	−7	35	
16	FC Dnipro Cherkasy	40	10	15	15	33	41	−8	35	
17	FC Avanhard Kerch	40	9	14	17	32	46	−14	32	
18	FC Shakhtar Krasnyi Luch	40	9	14	17	28	45	−17	32	
19	FC Start Dzerzhynsk	40	9	10	21	28	53	−25	28	
20	FC Industriya Yenakieve	40	9	8	23	27	56	−29	26	
21	FC Shakhtar Torez	40	4	12	24	25	62	−37	20	

== Final stage ==
Pos	Team	Pld	W	D	L	GF	GA	GD	Pts	Promotion
1	FC Avanhard Ternopil (C, P)	7	4	3	0	10	2	+8	11	Promoted
2	FC Bukovyna Chernivtsi (P)	7	4	3	0	11	4	+7	11	Promoted
3	FC Shakhtar Kadiivka (P)	7	2	4	1	5	4	+1	8	Promoted
4	FC Desna Chernihiv (P)	7	3	2	2	6	6	0	8	Promoted
5	FC Dynamo Khmelnytskyi (P)	7	3	1	3	8	7	+1	7	Promoted
6	FC Spartak Sumy	7	2	2	3	3	4	−1	6	
7	FC Lokomotyv Donetsk	7	1	2	4	5	8	−3	4	
8	FC Shakhtar Oleksandriya	7	0	1	6	3	16	−13	1	

(C) Champions; (P) Promoted

== See also ==
- Soviet Second League
