= Volodymyr Bulhakov =

Soviet footballer and coach (1947–2003)

Personal information
- Full name: Volodymyr Petrovych Bulhakov
- Date of birth: 8 February 1947
- Place of birth: Makiv, Dunaivtsi Raion, Ukrainian SSR, Soviet Union
- Date of death: 18 May 2003 (aged 56)
- Place of death: Lviv, Ukraine
- Height: 1.74 m (5 ft 8 1/2 in)
- Position: Midfielder

Youth career
- FC Dynamo Kyiv

Senior career*
Years	Team	Apps	(Gls)
1964	FC Dynamo Khmelnytskyi	20	(4)
1965–1966	FC Dynamo Kyiv		
1966	FC Dynamo Khmelnytskyi	17	(5)
1966–1971	FC Karpaty Lviv	126	(26)
1972	SC Lutsk		(5)
1973–1975	FC Sudnobudivnyk Mykolaiv	36	(12)
1975	FC Metalist Kharkiv	17	(1)
1976	FC Krystal Kherson	33	(4)

Managerial career
- 1977–1983: FC Metalist Kharkiv (ass't)
- 1984–1986: SKA Karpaty Lviv
- 1989: FC Krystal Kherson
- 1990: FC Karpaty Lviv
- 1992: Korona Kielce
- 1995: FC Podillya Khmelnytskyi (ass't)
- 1996: FC Podillya Khmelnytskyi
- 1997: FC Yavir Yavoriv
- 2002: FC Rava Rava-Ruska
- * Club domestic league appearances and goals

Volodymyr Bulhakov (Ukrainian: Володимир Петрович Булгаков; 1 January 1947 – 18 May 2003) was a former professional Soviet football midfielder and coach.
