= Maryan Plakhetko =

Ukrainian and Soviet footballer (1945–2020)

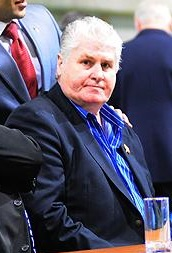
- Maryan Plakhetko in 2010

Personal information
- Full name: Maryan Ivanovych Plakhetko
- Date of birth: 1 March 1945
- Place of birth: Nyzhankovychi, Ukrainian SSR
- Date of death: 22 February 2020 (aged 74)
- Place of death: Moscow, Russia
- Position: Defender

Senior career*
Years	Team	Apps	(Gls)
1965	SKA Lviv	69	(3)
1968–1974	CSKA Moscow	125	(4)

International career
1968–1971	USSR	2	(0)

Managerial career
- 1983: CSKA Moscow (sports director)
- 1986—1987: CSKA Moscow (sports director)
- 1997—1998: FC Torpedo Moscow (sports director)
- 2001: CSKA Moscow (sports director)
- * Club domestic league appearances and goals

Maryan Ivanovych Plakhetko (Ukrainian: Мар'ян Іванович Плахетко, Russian: Марьян Иванович Плахетко; 1 March 1945 – 22 February 2020) was a Ukrainian and Soviet footballer.

== Honours ==
- Soviet Top League winner: 1970.

== International career ==
Plakhetko made his debut for USSR on 16 June 1968 in a friendly match against Austria.

== Family ==
His son Andrei played in CSKA 2, and other Moscow teams. Since 2000, he has been coach of the Sports School of CSKA Moscow.
