= Ernest Kesler =

Soviet footballer and coach

Personal information
- Full name: Alador-Ernest Ivanovych Kesler
- Date of birth: 31 July 1931
- Place of birth: Ruská, Czechoslovakia
- Date of death: 15 February 2004 (aged 72)
- Place of death: Uzhhorod, Ukraine
- Position: Forward

Senior career*
Years	Team	Apps	(Gls)
1946–1949	FC Lokomotyv Uzhhorod		
1949–1952	FC Spartak Uzhhorod	21	(21)
1953–1955	ODO Lviv	47	(15)
1956	FC Spartak Uzhhorod	21	(1)
1957–1958	SKVO Lviv	49	(12)

Managerial career
- 1966–1968: SKA Lviv
- 1970: SKA Lviv
- 1971: LVVPU (Note: Lviv Higher Military-Political School (LVVPU)) Lviv
- 1973–1976: SC Lutsk
- 1977: SKA Lviv
- 1979–1980: FC Hoverla Uzhhorod
- 1994: FC Zakarpattia Uzhhorod
- * Club domestic league appearances and goals

Ernest Kesler (Ukrainian: Ернест Іванович Кеслер, Hungarian: Keszler Ernő; 31 July 1931) is a former professional Soviet football forward and coach.
