= 1964 Soviet Class B =

Second League
- Season: 1964

1964 Soviet Class B was a Soviet football competition at the Soviet third tier.

== Russian Federation ==
=== Semifinal Group 1 ===
[Grozny]

| Pos | Team | Pld | W | D | L | GF | GA | GD | Pts |
|---|---|---|---|---|---|---|---|---|---|
| 1 | Textilshchik Ivanovo | 5 | 4 | 0 | 1 | 8 | 2 | +6 | 8 |
| 2 | Terek Grozny | 5 | 4 | 0 | 1 | 12 | 8 | +4 | 8 |
| 3 | Temp Barnaul | 5 | 2 | 1 | 2 | 9 | 9 | 0 | 5 |
| 4 | Stroitel Ufa | 5 | 1 | 2 | 2 | 3 | 7 | −4 | 4 |
| 5 | Znamya Truda Orekhovo-Zuyevo | 5 | 1 | 1 | 3 | 4 | 8 | −4 | 3 |
| 6 | Trudoviye Rezervy Kursk | 5 | 1 | 0 | 4 | 8 | 10 | −2 | 2 |

=== Semifinal Group 2 ===
[Orjonikidze]

| Pos | Team | Pld | W | D | L | GF | GA | GD | Pts |
|---|---|---|---|---|---|---|---|---|---|
| 1 | Spartak Orjonikidze | 5 | 3 | 1 | 1 | 7 | 5 | +2 | 7 |
| 2 | RostSelMash Rostov-na-Donu | 5 | 3 | 0 | 2 | 9 | 3 | +6 | 6 |
| 3 | Irtysh Omsk | 5 | 2 | 2 | 1 | 7 | 6 | +1 | 6 |
| 4 | Iskra Kazan | 5 | 2 | 1 | 2 | 6 | 5 | +1 | 5 |
| 5 | Zvezda Serpukhov | 5 | 2 | 0 | 3 | 4 | 6 | −2 | 4 |
| 6 | Uralets Nizhniy Tagil | 5 | 1 | 0 | 4 | 3 | 11 | −8 | 2 |

=== Final Group ===
[Nov 9-17, Orjonikidze]

| Pos | Team | Pld | W | D | L | GF | GA | GD | Pts |
|---|---|---|---|---|---|---|---|---|---|
| 1 | RostSelMash Rostov-na-Donu | 3 | 2 | 0 | 1 | 4 | 6 | −2 | 4 |
| 1 | Terek Grozny | 3 | 1 | 2 | 0 | 6 | 2 | +4 | 4 |
| 3 | Textilshchik Ivanovo | 3 | 1 | 1 | 1 | 2 | 1 | +1 | 3 |
| 4 | Spartak Orjonikidze | 3 | 0 | 1 | 2 | 2 | 5 | −3 | 1 |

=== Additional final ===
RostSelMash Rostov-na-Donu  2-0  Terek Grozny

== Ukraine ==
This season to the Ukrainian zone were added four teams from Belarus and three teams from Moldova. SKA Odessa did not participate as it gained its promotion last season. Two other newcomers were added: FC Chayka Balaklava and FC Dunayets Izmail.

This season play-off featured a mini League format. The two successive ranking teams from one group were put together in group with the other two teams from other two groups of equal rank. For example, the first two placed teams of each group played off between themselves for the final ranking. Teams from Belarus and Moldova did not participate at this stage.

=== Second stage for places 1-6 ===
| Pos | Team | Pld | W | D | L | GF | GA | GD | Pts |
|---|---|---|---|---|---|---|---|---|---|
| 1 | FC Lokomotyv Vinnytsia | 10 | 7 | 3 | 0 | 14 | 3 | +11 | 17 |
| 2 | SKA Kyiv | 10 | 8 | 0 | 2 | 15 | 8 | +7 | 16 |
| 3 | FC Polissya Zhytomyr | 10 | 4 | 3 | 3 | 9 | 7 | +2 | 11 |
| 4 | SC Tavriya Simferopol | 10 | 2 | 2 | 6 | 11 | 18 | −7 | 6 |
| 5 | FC Shakhtar Kadiivka | 10 | 2 | 2 | 6 | 8 | 17 | −9 | 6 |
| 6 | SKA Lviv | 10 | 2 | 0 | 8 | 12 | 16 | −4 | 4 |

=== Second stage for places 7-12 ===
| Pos | Team | Pld | W | D | L | GF | GA | GD | Pts |
|---|---|---|---|---|---|---|---|---|---|
| 7 | FC Kolhospnyk Poltava | 10 | 7 | 2 | 1 | 16 | 8 | +8 | 14 (Note: 2 points deducted?) |
| 8 | FC Hirnyk Kryvyi Rih | 10 | 5 | 3 | 2 | 10 | 5 | +5 | 13 |
| 9 | FC Verkhovyna Uzhhorod | 10 | 4 | 2 | 4 | 17 | 19 | −2 | 10 |
| 10 | FC Temp Kyiv | 10 | 3 | 2 | 5 | 13 | 13 | 0 | 8 |
| 11 | Chayka Balaklava | 10 | 3 | 1 | 6 | 11 | 16 | −5 | 7 |
| 12 | FC Zirka Kirovohrad | 10 | 2 | 2 | 6 | 9 | 16 | −7 | 6 |

Source: rsssf.com

== Union republics ==
[Oct 18-28, Klaipeda]

| Pos | Rep | Team | Pld | W | D | L | GF | GA | GD | Pts |
|---|---|---|---|---|---|---|---|---|---|---|
| 1 | LTU | Granitas Klaipeda | 4 | 3 | 0 | 1 | 7 | 2 | +5 | 6 |
| 1 | KAZ | Vostok Ust-Kamenogorsk | 4 | 3 | 0 | 1 | 5 | 3 | +2 | 6 |
| 3 | UZB | Politotdel Tashkent Region | 4 | 2 | 1 | 1 | 5 | 7 | −2 | 5 |
| 4 | GEO | Dinamo Batumi | 4 | 1 | 1 | 2 | 1 | 2 | −1 | 3 |
| 5 | BLR | Spartak Brest | 4 | 0 | 0 | 4 | 2 | 6 | −4 | 0 |

Source: rsssf.com

=== Additional final ===
[Nov 1, Kaliningrad]
Granitas Klaipeda  2-0 Vostok Ust-Kamenogorsk
