= FC Avanhard Ternopil =

Football club in Ukraine

FC Avanhard Ternopil was a football club based in Ternopil, Ukrainian SSR. The club played in the Soviet Second League 1960–1971. During that time the club also used to be called Budivelnyk. Its games it played at Ternopilsky Misky Stadion that was called Avanhard Stadium.

Currently in Ternopil there is another football club, FC Nyva Ternopil that one might mistakenly confuse with the former Avanhard. That club moved to the town from Berezhany, Ternopil Oblast when Ternopil was left without the big football.

== Honors ==
- Championship of the Ukrainian SSR
  - Winners (1): 1968
- Cup of the Ukrainian SSR
  - Runners-up (1): 1958

== See also ==
- FC Nyva Ternopil
