= MFC Mykolaiv =

Association football club in Ukraine

MFK Mykolaiv
- Full name: MFC Mykolaiv
- Nickname: Shipbuilders
- Founded: 1920
- Ground: Tsentralnyi Stadion
- Capacity: 15,600
- 2020–21: Ukrainian First League, 4th of 16 (relegated)
Home colours	Away colours	Third colours

Former club crest

MFС Mykolaiv (Municipal Football Club "Mykolaiv", Ukrainian: Муніципальний футбольний клуб "Миколаїв") is a Ukrainian football club based in Mykolaiv.

It is one of the oldest football clubs that exists in Ukraine. Originally was established as a football team of the Black Sea Shipyard, since dissolution of the Soviet Union and cutting of the shipyard's budget which was based mostly on military contacts, it is sponsored mostly by the city of Mykolaiv.

During the 2022 Russian invasion of Ukraine, Mykolaiv came under heavy fire from the Russian army, and the club’s stadium was damaged. Many players, fans and sponsors had fled the city to escape the violence of the war. MFK Mykolaiv decided to suspend all its matches for the time being, but to remain in existence pending an improvement in circumstances. During the 2025/2026 season, the Professional Football League of Ukraine was still considering what the club’s future status might be.

== Description ==
=== Names ===
- 1920–1922: Naval Factory
- 1922–1926: Marti-Badin Factory
- 1926–1926: Metalisty Mykolaiv
- 1927–1928: Raikom Metalistiv
- 1929–1935: Marti Factory
- 1936–1940: Sudnobudivnyk Mykolaiv
- 1941–1944: Nazi Germany occupation of Ukraine
- 1944–1949: Sudnobudivnyk Mykolaiv
- 1951–1952: Mykolaiv City
- 1953–1959: Avanhard Mykolaiv
- 1960–1965: Sudnobudivnyk Mykolaiv
- 1966–1966: Budivelnyk Mykolaiv
- 1967–1991: Sudnobudivnyk Mykolaiv
- 1992–1994: Evis Mykolaiv
- 1994–2002: SC Mykolaiv
- 2002–present: MFC Mykolaiv

=== History ===
The club was founded in 1920 under the name Sudostroitel (Sudnobudivnyk) Mykolaiv. It is the oldest continuously playing club in the country that competes on the professional level.

Throughout the Soviet times and until the 1990s, it mostly played under the name of Sudnobudivnyk meaning Shipbuilder associated with the Black Sea Shipyard.

MFC Mykolaiv took part in the first Ukrainian Premier League season in 1992 under the name FC Evis Mykolaiv, after being initially chosen to participate for being one of the top 9 (of 11) Ukrainian teams from the West Division of the Soviet Second League 1991. The club is one of the holders of the unfortunate distinction as being the team to be demoted three times from the Ukrainian Premier League.

MFС Mykolaiv's best achievement in the Ukrainian Premier League was 13th place (in 1994–95). From 1994, the club was known as SC Mykolaiv, FC Mykolaiv since 2000, and MFC Mykolaiv since 2006.

MFC Mykolaiv became insolvent and ceased to exist after the City Administration of Mykolaiv informed the PFL that the team would not be competing in the 2008/09 Persha Liha season. The team then requested re-admittance to the PFL, but it was too late as the calendar was already set up. The PFL allowed the club to compete in the Druha Liha, but only in the next season. The administration of the Dynamo Kyiv extended its helping hand by withdrawing its junior team Dynamo-3 Kyiv from the Second League and, thus, for Mykolaiv to be placed instead of it.

MFC Mykolaiv reached 1st place in Druha Liha group A in 2010–11 season and was promoted to Persha Liha.

Colours are blue and white hooped shirts, white shorts.

Ever since the club's stadium was damaged during the 2022 Battle of Mykolaiv, the club has suspended its matches pending better circumstances for resuming its activities.

== Honors ==
- Class B (2nd tier) (Football Championship of the Ukrainian SSR)
  - Runners-up (1): 1960
- Soviet Second League (Football Championship of the Ukrainian SSR)
  - Winners (1): 1974
  - Runners-up (2): 1971, 1990 (lower)
- Football Championship of the Ukrainian SSR (2nd tier)
  - Winners (1): 1936
- Ukrainian Persha Liha
  - Winners (1): 1997-98
  - Runners-up (1): 1993-94
- Ukrainian Druha Liha
  - Winners (2): 2005/06 (Group B), 2010-11 (Group A)

== League and cup history ==
Soviet competitions

Ukrainian competitions

Tier 1.
Tier 2.
Tier 3.
Tier 4, extra tier that existed rarely throughout the history
Tier 5, extra tier that existed in 1937
Amateurs

Information since Ukrainian Independence

Season	Div.	Pos.	Pl.	W	D	L	GS	GA	P	Domestic Cup	Europe	Notes
1992	1st "A"	9	18	3	4	11	12	29	10	1/32 finals		Relegated
1992–93	2nd	7	42	18	11	13	60	39	47	1/16 finals		
1993–94	2nd	2	38	25	6	7	76	32	56	1/16 finals		Promoted
1994–95	1st	13	34	11	5	18	33	59	38	1/32 finals		
1995–96	1st	16	34	10	8	16	37	53	38	1/32 finals		Relegated
1996–97	2nd	7	46	21	12	13	66	37	75	1/32 finals		
1997–98	2nd	1	42	31	5	6	94	31	98	1/16 finals		Promoted
1998–99	1st	16	30	2	6	22	18	67	12	1/8 finals		Relegated
1999–00	2nd	6	34	15	7	12	40	38	52	1/16 finals		
2000–01	2nd	4	34	17	8	9	41	30	59	1/16 finals		
2001–02	2nd	10	34	12	10	12	37	44	46	4th round		
2002–03	2nd	5	34	15	7	12	30	37	52	1/16 finals		
2003–04	2nd	12	34	11	9	14	31	31	42	1/16 finals		
2004–05	2nd	17	34	8	7	19	15	40	31	1/16 finals		Relegated
2005–06	3rd "A"	1	28	22	3	3	56	11	69	1/32 finals		Promoted
2006–07	2nd	13	36	12	10	14	33	40	46	1/32 finals		
2007–08	2nd	10	38	13	13	12	33	27	52	1/16 finals		Relegated
2008–09	3rd "A"	11	32	11	10	11	28	27	43	Did not enter		
2009–10	3rd "A"	4	20	11	6	3	30	13	39	1/16 finals		
2010–11	3rd "A"	1	22	15	3	4	29	12	48	1/32 finals		Promoted
2011–12	2nd	16	34	9	4	21	33	51	28	1/16 finals		-3
2012–13	2nd	6	34	16	9	9	45	41	54	1/32 finals		-3
2013–14	2nd	16	30	9	4	17	34	49	31	1/8 finals		
2014–15	2nd	14	30	6	6	18	34	67	24	1/16 finals		
2015–16	2nd	7	30	13	8	9	34	27	44	1/8 finals		-3
2016–17	2nd	14	34	11	4	19	35	44	37	1/2 finals		
2017–18	2nd	10	34	12	8	14	39	50	44	1/32 finals		
2018–19	2nd	9	28	10	7	11	34	32	37	1/16 finals		
2019–20	2nd	11	30	8	10	12	45	45	34	1/8 finals		
2020–21	2nd	4	30	15	8	7	49	23	53	1/16 finals		

== MFC Mykolaiv-2 ==
The club entered their reserve team into the Ukrainian Second League for the 2017–18 season.

Season	Div.	Pos.	Pl.	W	D	L	GS	GA	P	Domestic Cup	Europe	Notes
1996–97	4th	3	8	0	0	8	0	5	0			
did not participate
2017–18	3rd	9	33	10	7	16	41	58	37			
2018–19	3rd	9	27	5	5	17	22	52	20			
