= SKA Lviv =

- Full name: SKA Lviv
- Founded: 1949
- Dissolved: 1989
- Ground: Army Sports Club Stadium (Lviv)
- Capacity: 23,000
Home colours

SKA Lviv was a Soviet multi-sports club that existed in Lviv, Ukrainian SSR. The club was created as part of the sport section of the Carpathian Military District in 1949 and existed until 1989. It was primarily known for its football "team of masters" (Soviet term for a professional team).

Until the appearance of Karpaty Lviv, the trade union team of masters, and Karpaty's promotion to the Soviet championship Class A in 1971, SKA Lviv was the Lviv city's main football team in 1950s and 1960s. In the 1980s, both Karpaty and SKA were merged into SKA Karpaty as part of the army sports club. In 1989, SKA Karpaty was dissolved, and the main army team moved to Drohobych, Lviv Oblast (see FC Halychyna Drohobych), reorganizing into SFC Drohobych. Simultaneously, FC Karpaty Lviv was reinstated as well.

== Name change ==
- 1949 – 1956 ODO Lviv
- 1957 – 1957 OSK Lviv
- 1957 – 1959 SKVO Lviv
- 1960 – 1971 SKA Lviv
- 1972 – 1976 SK Lutsk (reorganization; merged with FC Torpedo Lutsk)
  - 1973 – 1976 SKA Lviv (at amateur competitions)
- 1977 – 1981 SKA Lviv (reinstated as professional team)
- 1982 – 1989 SKA Karpaty Lviv (merged with FC Karpaty Lviv)

== History ==
=== ODO Lviv ===
During its history, the club went through several transformations and mergers. It was founded in 1949 as ODO Lviv (in Russian, ODO means the Oblast Dome [Club] of Officers) and began its legacy in the Second Group of the Soviet football competitions (Soviet First League). ODO Lviv was part of the Fitness-Sports Union of Armed Forces under the jurisdiction of the Sports Committee of the Armed Forces of USSR. In western Ukraine, all organizations of the central government were centers of Russian culture, especially the Soviet Army. The army-men team played along with their city rivals Spartak Lviv, which placed second. The performance of the ODO Lviv was under par, and the club was relegated next year to the amateur level as the Second Group was liquidated in 1950. Spartak Lviv was transferred under the jurisdiction of FSC Dynamo, which was not able to prepare the team for the next season. Spartak Lviv was successfully dissolved.

This way, ODO Lviv became the best club in the city. For the next several years, the club participated in the republican championship among the Fitness and Sports clubs (KFK competitions). In 1950, ODO Lviv placed second after Spartak Uzhhorod, which became the champion of Ukrainian SSR. Next season, the club won its zonal tournament against several other Lviv teams such as Kharchovyk (Tobacco factory), Iskra, Dynamo, and eventually became vice-champion by beating ODO Kiev. In 1952, SKA Lviv placed only 4th in its zone, higher than its city rival Kharchovyk Vynnyky.

=== First League successes ===
With another reorganization of the championship, ODO Lviv returned to the Soviet First League under the leadership of Aleksey Grinin. Among notable players that time were Yozhef Betsa, Myroslav Dumansky, Ernest Kesler, and others. In 1956, ODO Lviv played the future Dynamo Kyiv captain, Vasyl Turyanchyk. Renamed in 1957, SKVO Lviv won the Class B tournament and advanced to the 1/8 finals of the Soviet Cup, where they faced Spartak Moscow. On June 6, 1957, both teams met at the SKA Stadium. Most of the Spartak players a year ago won the Olympic gold in Melbourne and managed to pull a win in the second half 1:2.

In 1960, the name changed to SKA (Sport Club of the Army) for all Army clubs except Moscow's one, which became CSKA (the Central Sport Club of the Army).

In 1965, SKA became the champions of Ukraine. Here is the winning squad:
(first number indicates games played, second - goals scored (or allowed))

- Goalkeepers: Boris Malyamin (34, -?), Vasyl Kachorets (22, -?).
- Defenders: Taras Shulyatytskyi (36, 13), Petro Danylchuk (36, 3), Volodymyr Kaplychnyi (36, 2), Viktor Suchkov (25, 2), Andriy Karimov (26).
- Midfielders: Yaroslav Dmytrasevych (31), Arpad Shandor (29, 3), Imre Lendyel (28, 3), Maryan Plakhetko (19).
- Forwards: Stepan Varga (34, 16), Bohdan Hreshchak (33, 6), Leonardas Zhukauskas (33, 15), Volodymyr Kolodiy (32, 13), Tomash Pfaifer (28, 10), Mykhailo Melnyk (5), Yuriy Basalyk (?).
- Senior coach: Sergei Shaposhnikov. Coach: Ernest Kesler.

In 1972, SKA Lviv was renamed once again. It was also relocated to Lutsk in neighboring Volyn Oblast, playing as SC Lutsk in place of the dissolved Torpedo Lutsk representing the Carpathian Military District. The reformed team was mostly composed of players who, in the previous season, played for SKA Lviv and was led by the SKA Lviv head coach Mykhailo Rybak. They were joined by a few players from Torpedo Lutsk, Horyn Rivne, and other players.

During the period when the first team of the Carpathian Military District played in Lutsk, they were also fielding another squad in the KFK competition (amateur level) as SKA Lviv, based in Lviv.

In 1977, Torpedo Lutsk was revived, and SC Lutsk returned to Lviv under its regular name of SKA Lviv.

In 1982, the SKA Lviv from the Soviet Second League was united with the other club from Lviv, Karpaty Lviv, which participated in the Soviet First League. The new team has taken the place of FC Karpaty Lviv and was renamed into SKA Karpaty Lviv. In 1989, Karpaty were revived and entered competitions of the Soviet Second League. In 1990, the SKA Karpaty was relegated and moved to Drohobych playing as SFC Drohobych in the Soviet Second League. Soon, after a few months, the club was renamed again in Halychyna Drohobych. The last renaming led to a scandal after which the Carpathian Military District refused to be associated with the team.

== League and Cup history ==
=== SKA Lviv ===
Season	Div.	Pos.	Pl.	W	D	L	GS	GA	P	Domestic Cup	Europe	Notes
1949	2nd	17	34	7	6	21	37	90	20	1/256 finals		Ukrainian SSR Relegated
1950	3rd	2								no participation		Ukrainian SSR Finals
1951	3rd	2								no participation		Ukrainian SSR Finals
1952	3rd	4								no participation		Ukrainian SSR Zone 4
1953	Death of Joseph Stalin											
1954	2nd	7	22	7	6	9	24	32	20	1/8 finals		Zone 3
1955	2nd	7	30	13	6	11	47	40	32	1/64 finals		Zone 1
1956	2nd	5	34	16	9	9	49	25	41			Zone 1
1957	2nd	2	34	21	6	7	51	32	48			Zone 2
1958	2nd	1	30	18	7	5	45	26	43	1/8 finals		Zone 3
1958	2nd	5	5	1	1	3	8	13	3	1/8 finals		Finals
1959	2nd	6	28	14	5	9	48	27	33			Zone 4
1960	2nd	6	32	17	6	9	46	29	40	1/32 finals		Ukrainian SSR Zone 1
1961	2nd	4	34	17	8	9	42	30	42	1/64 finals		Ukrainian SSR Zone 1
1961	2nd	Playoff	2	1	1	0	2	1	3	1/64 finals		vs Metalurh Zaporizhia
1962	2nd	4	24	10	6	8	37	25	26	1/256 finals		Ukrainian SSR Zone 1
1962	2nd	1	10	5	5	0	18	6	15	1/256 finals		7–17 places tournament
1963	3rd	2	38	26	7	5	82	35	59	1/512 finals		Ukrainian SSR Zone 1
1963	3rd	Playoff	2	0	1	1	0	1	1	1/512 finals		vs Azovstal Zhdanov
1964	3rd	2	30	14	9	7	47	21	37	1/4 finals		Ukrainian SSR Zone 1
1964	3rd	6	10	2	0	8	12	16	4	1/4 finals		1–6 places tournament
1965	3rd	1	30	20	6	4	74	20	46	1/256 finals		Ukrainian SSR Zone 2
1965	3rd	1	10	7	2	1	24	9	16	1/256 finals		1–6 places tournament
1966	2nd	3	34	15	10	9	44	29	40	1/64 finals		2nd subgroup
1967	2nd	3	38	17	14	7	42	27	48	1/128 finals		2nd subgroup
1968	2nd	7	40	16	14	10	40	42	46	1/64 finals		1st subgroup
1969	2nd	13	42	14	11	17	40	47	39	1/128 finals		3rd subgroup
1970	3rd	14	42	12	15	15	30	41	39	1/128 finals		1st Zone
1971	3rd	23	50	10	17	23	33	55	37			1st Zone
see SC Lutsk (1972–1976)
1977	3rd Vtoraya Liga	10	44	16	16	12	61	43	48			2nd Zone
1978	3rd Vtoraya Liga	9	44	16	14	14	52	43	46			2nd Zone
1979	3rd Vtoraya Liga	3	46	25	11	10	67	33	61			2nd Zone
1980	3rd Vtoraya Liga	3	44	24	12	8	64	32	60			5th Zone merged w/Karpaty
1981	3rd Vtoraya Liga	9	44	16	15	13	49	47	47			5th Zone merged w/Karpaty
see SKA Karpaty Lviv (1982–1989)

=== SC Lutsk ===
Season	Div.	Pos.	Pl.	W	D	L	GS	GA	P	Domestic Cup	Europe	Notes
1972	3rd Vtoraya Liga	22	46	8	17	21	30	52	33			1st Zone
1973	3rd Vtoraya Liga	19	44	11	11	22	25	50	30			1st Zone (−3)
1974	3rd Vtoraya Liga	9	38	14	12	12	33	31	40			6th Zone
1975	3rd Vtoraya Liga	3	32	13	12	7	46	26	38			6th Zone
1975	3rd Vtoraya Liga	6	5	0	0	5	2	12	0			League Semifinals
1976	3rd Vtoraya Liga	9	38	11	16	11	34	34	38			6th Zone

=== SKA Karpaty Lviv ===
Season	Div.	Pos.	Pl.	W	D	L	GS	GA	P	Domestic Cup	Europe	Notes
1982	2nd Pervaya Liga	10	42	16	10	16	44	37	42	Group stage		
1983	2nd Pervaya Liga	11	42	15	12	15	43	46	42	1/32 finals		
1984	2nd Pervaya Liga	3	42	20	9	13	63	44	49	1/16 finals		
1985	2nd Pervaya Liga	2	20	8	7	5	25	18	23	1/64 finals		West
1985	2nd Pervaya Liga	3	42	21	13	8	66	44	54	1/64 finals		Group A
1986	2nd Pervaya Liga	4	46	22	10	14	69	52	54	1/64 finals		
1987	2nd Pervaya Liga	5	42	17	12	13	62	46	46	1/4 finals		
1988	2nd Pervaya Liga	7	42	18	8	16	51	39	44	1/32 finals		
1989	2nd Pervaya Liga	22	42	5	7	30	37	37	17	1/8 finals		Relegated
1990	converted to SFC Drohobych									1/64 finals		Dissolved

== See also ==
- FC Karpaty Lviv
- SKA-Orbita Lviv
- FC Lviv (1992)
- FC Halychyna Drohobych
