= FC Stakhanov =

- Founded: 1936
- Ground: Peremoha Stadium, Kadiivka, Luhansk Oblast

FC Stakhanov is a Ukrainian football club. The club was based in Kadiivka (formerly Stakhanov), Ukraine.

== Brief history ==
Soviet championship

- Stakhanovets Stakhanov 1936 – 1941
  - During World War II did not exist, Ukraine was occupied by Nazi Germany
- Shakhtar Kadiyivka 1946 – 1979
- Stakhanovets Stakhanov 1980 – 1991 (amateur status in 1987–1990)

Ukrainian championship

- Vahonobudivnyk Stakhanov 1991 – 1994
- Shakhtar Stakhanov 1994 – 1999
- Dynamo Stakhanov 1999 – 2004 (as amateur club)
- Stakhanovets Stakhanov 2005 (as amateur club)
- FC Stakhanov 2007 – present (as amateur club)

== Managers ==
List of managers

- 1950 – 1952 Anton Yakovlev
- 1956 Viktor Ponomaryov
- 1957 Anton Yakovlev
- 1957 – 1958 Valeriy Bekhtenev
- 1958 – 1959 Aleksandr Petrov
- 1960 Ivan Larin
- 1961 Yakiv Borysov
- 1963 Pyotr Shcherbatenko
- 1964 – 1965 Volodymyr Soldatchenko
- 1966 Viktor Sokolov
- 1969 Volodymyr Soldatchenko
- 1970 – 1971 Viktor Fomin
- 1971 Oleh Bazylevych
- 1972 – 1973 Vasiliy Vasilyev
- 1981 Viacheslav Aliabiev
- 1981 – 1983 Andrei Kuchinskiy
- 1984 Petro Nykytenko
- 1985 Anatoliy Cheremin
- 1985 – 1986 Oleksiy Rastorhuyev
- 1990 Serhiy Horkovenko
- 1991 Oleksandr Hulevskyi
- 1991 – 1993 Oleksandr Tkachenko
- 1995 Yuriy Boldarev
- 1996 Rostyslav Lysenko
- 1998 Rostyslav Lysenko
- 2005 Anatoliy Cheremin
- 2007 Anatoliy Hladkykh
- 2009 Dmytro Kharlamov
- 2010 – 2011 Volodymyr Kuzovlyev
- 2017 – Hela Dzhakonia
