= 2004–05 Ukrainian Second League =

Ukrainian Second League
- Season: 2004–05
- Champions: FC Rava Rava-Ruska; FC Krymteplitsia Molodizhne; FC Helios Kharkiv
- Top goalscorer: 20 – Oleksandr Kozhemyachenko (Desna Chernihiv)

The 2004–05 Ukrainian Second League was the 14th season of 3rd level professional football in Ukraine.

The competitions were divided into three groups according to geographical location in the country – A is western Ukraine, B is southern Ukraine and Crimea, and C is eastern Ukraine.

== Team changes ==
=== Promoted ===
The following team was promoted from the 2004 Ukrainian Football Amateur League:

- FC Bershad – (returning after an absence of 6 seasons, previously as Nyva Bershad)
- Hirnyk Kryvyi Rih – (debut)
- Real Odesa – (debut)
- Olimpik Donetsk – (debut)

The 2003 Ukrainian Football Amateur League participant:

- Molniya Severodonetsk – (debut, replaced Avanhard-Inter Rovenky)

Also, three more clubs were admitted:

- PFC Oleksandriya – (returning after an absence of 1 season)
- Fakel Ivano-Frankivsk – (debut)
- MFC Oleksandria – (debut)

=== Relegated ===
From the First League

- Karpaty-2 Lviv – (returning for the first time after the club's reorganization in 2001, previously as FC Lviv (1992) in 1994–95)
- Osvita Borodyanka – (returning after an absence of 2 seasons, previously as Systema-Boreks Borodianka)

From the Top League

- Zirka Kirovohrad – (returning after an absence of 10 seasons)

=== Withdrawn ===
- FC Podillya Khmelnytskyi, merged with FC Krasyliv as Podillya Khmelnytskyi
- FC Avanhard Rovenky
- FC Vodnyk Mykolaiv
- FC Elektron Romny

Some second teams were withdrawn to reform into reserve teams to compete in separate competitions:

- FC Borysfen-2 Boryspil
- FC Kryvbas-2 Kryvyi Rih
- FC Chornomorets-2 Odesa
- FC Dnipro-2 Dnipropetrovsk
- FC Metalurh-2 Donetsk
- FC Arsenal-2 Kyiv
- FC Karpaty-Halychyna Lviv

=== Name change ===
- Osvita Borodyanka was previously known as Boreks-Borysfen
- FC Dnipro Cherkasy was known as FC Cherkasy

=== Changed groups ===
- Hirnyk-Sport Komsomolsk from Group B to C
- FC Cherkasy from Group B to C

=== Location map ===
Locations of team home grounds in Ukrainian Second League 2004–05

== Group A ==
Pos	Team	Pld	W	D	L	GF	GA	GD	Pts	Promotion or relegation
1	Rava Rava-Ruska (C)	28	21	4	3	49	16	+33	67	Champions (Note: Rava Rava-Ruska were denied promotion to the First League by the PFL due to inadequate finances. Instead the PFL promoted Enerhetyk Burshtyn.)
2	Enerhetyk Burshtyn (P)	28	15	6	7	43	29	+14	51	Promoted to First League
3	Karpaty-2 Lviv	28	15	5	8	47	30	+17	50	
4	Fakel Ivano-Frankivsk	28	15	4	9	38	35	+3	49	
5	FC Bershad (P)	28	14	7	7	33	21	+12	49	Promoted to First League (Note: FC Bershad merged their operations with FC Nyva Vinnytsia and were promoted to the First League.)
6	Bukovyna Chernivtsi	28	14	6	8	33	22	+11	48	
7	Osvita Borodianka	28	12	10	6	34	22	+12	46	
8	Tekhno-Center Rohatyn (D)	28	12	6	10	33	29	+4	42	Withdrew (Note: Tekhno-Center Rohatyn completed the season but withdrew from the PFL prior to the start of the next season.)
9	Chornohora Ivano-Frankivsk	28	10	4	14	20	43	−23	34	
10	Dynamo-3 Kyiv	28	9	7	12	31	35	−4	34	
11	Veres Rivne	28	9	6	13	35	38	−3	33	
12	Naftovyk Dolyna	28	9	3	16	25	49	−24	30	
13	Spartak-2 Kalush (D)	28	6	2	20	17	12	+5	20	Expelled (Note: Spartak-2 Kalush were expelled from the competition on March 29, 2005 after failing to pay license fees for the second half of the season. The rest of its matches were considered for technical losses.)
14	Obolon-2 Kyiv	28	4	7	17	21	49	−28	19	
15	Nyva Ternopil	28	4	5	19	18	47	−29	17	

(C) Champions; (D) Disqualified; (P) Promoted

=== Expelled teams ===
On March 29, 2005 Spartak-2 Kalush after failing to pay license fees for the second half of the season the PFL expelled them from the competition. Their record at that time was 6 wins, 2 draws, 6 losses, and 17-12 goal difference.

=== Top goalscorers ===
	Scorer	Goals (Pen.)	Team
1	(Ukraine) Andriy Malyk	13	Karpaty-2 Lviv
2	(Ukraine) Serhiy Ditkovsky	11	Osvita Borodianka
2	(Ukraine) Andriy Pokladok	11 (1)	Rava Rava-Ruska
4	(Ukraine) Ihor Khudobyak	10	Fakel Ivano-Frankivsk
5	(Ukraine) Vasyl Shved	9	Tekhno-Center Rohatyn
5	(Ukraine) Andriy Kuzio	9	Naftovyk Dolyna

== Group B ==
Pos	Team	Pld	W	D	L	GF	GA	GD	Pts	Promotion or relegation
1	Krymteplytsia Molodizhne (C, P)	26	20	5	1	51	17	+34	65	Promoted to First League
2	Krystal Kherson	26	13	7	6	34	17	+17	46	
3	PFC Oleksandria	26	13	6	7	30	19	+11	45	
4	Tytan Armyansk	26	13	5	8	44	32	+12	44	
5	Palmira Odesa (D)	26	12	7	7	31	25	+6	43	Withdrew (Note: Both Palmira Odesa and Real Odesa completed the season but failed to submit a license for the next season and subsequently withdrew from the PFL.)
6	Ros Bila Tserkva	26	12	3	11	28	33	−5	39	
7	Real Odesa (D)	26	9	10	7	25	27	−2	37	Withdrew
8	OLKOM Melitopol	26	9	7	10	27	33	−6	34	
9	Elektrometalurh-NZF Nikopol (D)	26	10	2	14	26	36	−10	32	Withdrew (Note: Elektrometalurh-NZF Nikopol completed the season but failed to find a sponsor for the next season and became insolvent, withdrawing from the PFL before the start of the next season.)
10	Dnister Ovidiopol	26	9	4	13	33	37	−4	31	
11	Hirnyk Kryvyi Rih	26	7	6	13	21	25	−4	27	
12	Zirka Kirovohrad	26	7	6	13	29	38	−9	27	
13	PFC Sevastopol	26	7	4	15	19	34	−15	25	
14	Olimpia AES Pivdenoukrainsk	26	1	8	17	7	32	−25	11	

(C) Champions; (D) Disqualified; (P) Promoted

=== Top goalscorers ===
	Scorer	Goals (Pen.)	Team
1	(Ukraine) Yevhen Arbuzov	18 (7)	Tytan Armyansk
2	(Ukraine) Yuri Yaskov	13 (2)	Palmira Odesa
3	(Ukraine) Roman Dovzhyk	11	Tytan Armyansk
4	(Ukraine) Oleksandr Kapusta	10 (2)	Olkom Melitopol
5	(Ukraine) Oleksandr Buriy	9	PFC Oleksandria
5	(Ukraine) Maksym Kryvovyaziy	9	Krymteplytsia Molodizhne

== Group C ==
Pos	Team	Pld	W	D	L	GF	GA	GD	Pts	Promotion or relegation
1	Helios Kharkiv (C, P)	28	25	2	1	64	18	+46	77	Promoted to First League
2	Desna Chernihiv	28	21	4	3	59	26	+33	67	
3	Dnipro Cherkasy	28	20	5	3	48	15	+33	65	Renamed (Note: FK Cherkasy, competed in the 2003–04 Ukrainian Second League were moved to Group C due to geographic alignment. The club renamed themselves to Dnipro Cherkassy during the mid-season winter break.)
4	Molniya Sieverodonetsk (D)	28	18	4	6	47	29	+18	58	Withdrew (Note: Molniya Sieverodonetsk completed the season, but withdrew from the league before the start of the next season citing financial difficulties. (4 August 2005))
5	Illichivets-2 Mariupol	28	13	4	11	49	27	+22	43	
6	Hazovyk Kharkiv	28	12	7	9	36	35	+1	43	
7	MFC Oleksandria	28	8	8	12	32	40	−8	32	
8	Uholyok Dymytrov (D)	28	8	7	13	36	47	−11	31	Renamed – Withdrew (Note: Vuhlyk Dymytrov renamed themselves prior to the start of the season to Uholyok Dymytrov. The club completed the season but prior to the start of the next season failed to get sponsorship and became insolvent.)
9	Hirnyk-Sport Komsomolsk	28	10	0	18	35	49	−14	30	
10	Yavir Krasnopillia	28	8	5	15	24	40	−16	29	
11	Olimpik Donetsk	28	8	3	17	33	54	−21	27	
12	Shakhtar-3 Donetsk	28	7	5	16	35	55	−20	26	
13	Metalurh-2 Zaporizhzhia	28	6	7	15	27	48	−21	25	
14	Metalist-2 Kharkiv (D)	28	6	6	16	28	49	−21	24	Withdrew (Note: The main clubs of both Metalist-2 Kharkiv and Vorskla-2 Poltava consolidated their reserve club operations not entering their clubs in the next season, since they both had reserve clubs in the Ukrainian Premier Reserve League which began its inaugural season in the 2004.)
15	Vorskla-2 Poltava (D)	28	4	5	19	21	42	−21	17	Withdrew

(C) Champions; (D) Disqualified; (P) Promoted

=== Top goalscorers ===
	Scorer	Goals (Pen.)	Team
1	(Ukraine) Oleksandr Kozhemyachenko	20 (10)	Desna Chernihiv
2	(Ukraine) Serhiy Kandaurov	18 (5)	Helios Kharkiv
3	(Ukraine) Oleksandr Tarasenko	15 (1)	Helios Kharkiv
4	(Ukraine) Ihor Bobovych	13	Desna Chernihiv
5	(Ukraine) Oleksandr Chekh	12	Uholyok Dymytrov
5	(Ukraine) Dmytro Viter	12	MFC Oleksandriya
5	(Ukraine) Kostyantyn Pinchuk	12 (8)	Molniya Sieverodonetsk

== See also ==
- 2004–05 Ukrainian Premier League
- 2004–05 Ukrainian First League
- 2004–05 Ukrainian Cup
