= 2003–04 Ukrainian Second League =

Ukrainian Second League
- Season: 2003–04
- Champions: FC Hazovyk-Skala Stryi; FC Dynamo Simferopol; FC Stal Dniprodzerzhynsk
- Relegated: (8 withdrew)
- Top goalscorer: (21) - Roman Karakevych (Rava Rava-Ruska)

The 2003–04 Ukrainian Second League was the 13th season of 3rd level professional football in Ukraine.

The competitions were divided into three groups according to geographical location in the country – A is western Ukraine, B is southern Ukraine and Crimea, and C is eastern Ukraine.

== Team changes ==
=== Promoted ===
The following team was promoted from the 2003 Ukrainian Football Amateur League:

- FC Cherkasy – (returning after an absence of a seasons)
- FC Hazovyk-KhGV Kharkiv – (debut)
- FC Helios Kharkiv – (debut)
- FC Ikva Mlyniv – (debut, admitted in place of FC Kovel-Volyn-2)
- FC Krymteplytsia Molodizhne – (debut)
- FC Rava Rava-Ruska – (debut)
- FC Vodnyk Mykolaiv – (debut)

Also, three more clubs were admitted additionally:

- FC Arsenal-2 Kyiv – (debut)
- FC Kryvbas-2 Kryvyi Rih – (returning after an absence of a seasons)
- FC Palmira Odesa – (debut)

=== Relegated ===
Only one team was relegated from the 2002–03 Ukrainian First League.

- FC Sokil Zolochiv – 18th place (returning after a season)

=== Renamed / reorganized ===
- FC Karpaty-3 Lviv changed its name to FC Halychyna-Karpaty Lviv.
- FC LUKOR Kalush (last year winner) changed its name to FC Prykarpattia Kalush after merging with FC Prykarpattia Ivano-Frankivsk.
  - The second half of the season it changed to FC Spartak-2 Ivano-Frankivsk.
- FC Dynamo Simferopol changed its name to FC Dynamo-Ihroservice Simferopol.
- FC Avanhard Rovenky changed its name to FC Avanhard-Inter Rovenky.
  - FC Avanhard Rovenky at first merged with FC Inter Luhansk, later with FC Molniya Severodonetsk continuing to play as Avanhard-Inter.

=== Withdrawn ===
==== Before ====
- FC Sokil Zolochiv, recently relegated from the 2002–03 Ukrainian First League it withdrew before the season
- FC Shakhtar Luhansk, a last season group runner-up, it folded before the season
- FC Systema-KKhP Chernyakhiv, a single season team, it withdrew before the season
- FC Kovel-Volyn-2 failed to obtain license for the season

==== During ====
- FC Vodnyk Mykolaiv, withdrew at mid-season
- FC Elektron Romny, withdrew just before the end of the season
- FC Arsenal-2 Kyiv, withdrew just before the end of the season

==== After ====
- FC Avanhard Rovenky, replaced with FC Molniya Severodonetsk at the end of the season
- FC Podillya Khmelnytskyi, merged with FC Krasyliv-Obolon as FC Podillya Khmelnytskyi
- FC Borysfen-2 Boryspil
- FC Karpaty-Halychyna Lviv
- FC Chornomorets-2 Odesa, transitioned into reserve championship
- FC Kryvbas-2 Kryvyi Rih, transitioned into reserve championship
- FC Dnipro-2 Dnipropetrovsk, transitioned into reserve championship
- FC Metalurh-2 Donetsk, transitioned into reserve championship

=== Changed groups ===
- Borysfen-2 Boryspil from Group B to A
- Obolon-2 Kyiv from Group B to A
- Metalurh-2 Zaporizhzhia from Group B to C

== Group A ==
=== Location map ===
Locations of team home grounds in Ukrainian Second League 2003–04 (Group A)

=== Final standings ===
Pos	Team	Pld	W	D	L	GF	GA	GD	Pts	Promotion or relegation
1	Hazovyk-Skala Stryj (C, P)	30	18	11	1	46	15	+31	65	
2	Podillya Khmelnytskyi (W)	30	17	8	5	47	20	+27	59	Merged with Krasyliv (Note: FC Podillya Khmelnytskyi merged with FC Krasyliv as Podillya Khmelnytskyi in the First League, while at same time another Podillya Khmelnytskyi continued to participate in the Khmelnytskyi Oblast Football Championship.)
3	Rava Rava-Ruska	30	17	5	8	47	25	+22	56	
4	Tekhno-Centre Rohatyn	30	16	6	8	39	29	+10	54	
5	Enerhetyk Burshtyn	30	14	7	9	41	28	+13	49	
6	Nyva Ternopil	30	13	8	9	30	36	−6	47	
7	Obolon-2 Kyiv	30	9	12	9	25	30	−5	39	
8	Spartak-2 Kalush (Note: During winter break FC Prykarpattia Kalush changed its name to FC Spartak-2 Kalush.)	30	11	4	15	29	31	−2	37	
9	Naftovyk Dolyna	30	10	7	13	32	37	−5	37	
10	Veres Rivne	30	9	8	13	32	43	−11	35	
11	Dynamo-3 Kyiv	30	9	7	14	26	27	−1	34	
12	Bukovyna Chernivtsi	30	8	9	13	21	35	−14	33	
13	Chornohora Ivano-Frankivsk	30	7	9	14	23	36	−13	30	
14	Karpaty-Halychyna Lviv (R, W)	30	7	7	16	22	36	−14	28	Withdrew
15	Ikva Mlyniv (W)	30	6	10	14	24	38	−14	28	Withdrew
16	Borysfen-2 Boryspil (R, W)	30	7	6	17	28	46	−18	27	Withdrew

(C) Champions; (P) Promoted; (R) Relegated; (W) Withdrew

=== Top goalscorers ===
	Scorer	Goals (Pen.)	Team
1	Roman Karakevych	21	Rava Rava-Ruska
2	Ihor Stasyuk	10	Podillya Khmelnytskyi
2	Ivan Fedyk	10	Tekhno-Center Rohatyn
2	Serhiy Voznyuk	10	Veres Rivne
5	Serhiy Sernetskyi	9	Nyva Ternopil
5	Roman Halun	9	Rava Rava-Ruska
5	Roman Pytsur	9	Hazovyk-Skala Stryi

== Group B ==
=== Location map ===
Locations of team home grounds in Ukrainian Second League 1992-93

=== Final standings ===
Pos	Team	Pld	W	D	L	GF	GA	GD	Pts	Promotion or relegation
1	Dynamo Simferopol (C, P)	30	24	3	3	60	24	+36	75	
2	Elektrometalurh-NZF Nikopol	30	16	9	5	43	28	+15	57	
3	Krymteplytsia Molodizhne	30	16	8	6	46	31	+15	56	
4	Dnister Ovidiopol	30	16	7	7	38	23	+15	55	
5	OLKOM Melitopol	30	13	6	11	39	44	−5	45	
6	Palmira Odesa	30	13	2	15	34	37	−3	41	
7	Olimpia AES Yuzhnoukrainsk	30	12	5	13	34	41	−7	41	
8	Cherkasy	30	11	7	12	40	40	0	40	
9	Tytan Armyansk	30	10	10	10	31	31	0	40	
10	Sevastopol	30	10	8	12	26	33	−7	38	
11	Chornomorets-2 Odesa (W)	30	10	7	13	35	43	−8	37	Withdrew
12	Kryvbas-2 Kryvyi Rih (W)	30	10	6	14	33	44	−11	36	Withdrew
13	Ros Bila Tserkva	30	9	9	12	26	38	−12	36	
14	Hirnyk-Sport Komsomolsk	30	10	5	15	40	40	0	35	
15	Krystal Kherson	30	7	7	16	26	37	−11	28	
16	Vodnyk Mykolaiv (R, W)	30	2	3	25	7	24	−17	9	Withdrew

(C) Champions; (P) Promoted; (R) Relegated; (W) Withdrew

=== Top goalscorers ===
	Scorer	Goals (Pen.)	Team
1	Oleksiy Hryshchenko	15	Dynamo-Ihorservis
2	Volodymyr Braila	12	Dynamo-Ihorservis
3	Oleksandr Kapusta	11	Olkom Melitopol
3	Denys Vakar	11	Palmira Odesa
3	Oleksandr Kovpak	11	Cherkasy
3	Dmytro Manuilenko	11	Hirnyk-Sport Komsomolsk

== Group C ==
=== Location map ===
Locations of team home grounds in Ukrainian Second League 1992-93

=== Final standings ===
Pos	Team	Pld	W	D	L	GF	GA	GD	Pts	Promotion or relegation
1	Stal Dniprodzerzhynsk (C, P)	30	23	6	1	53	16	+37	75	
2	Desna Chernihiv	30	23	5	2	67	25	+42	74	
3	Metalurh-2 Zaporizhzhia	30	17	5	8	54	31	+23	56	
4	Shakhtar-3 Donetsk	30	18	1	11	55	36	+19	55	
5	Metalist-2 Kharkiv	30	17	4	9	55	27	+28	55	
6	Helios Kharkiv	30	15	7	8	41	32	+9	52	
7	Hazovyk Kharkiv	30	15	3	12	37	34	+3	48	
8	Avanhard-Inter Rovenky (W)	30	13	8	9	35	32	+3	47	Replaced with FC Molniya Severodonetsk
9	Illychivets-2 Mariupol	30	11	9	10	38	40	−2	42	
10	Yavir Krasnopillia	30	10	7	13	20	28	−8	37	
11	Vorskla-2 Poltava	30	9	8	13	34	42	−8	35	
12	Dnipro-2 Dnipropetrovsk (W)	30	9	2	19	36	56	−20	29	Withdrew
13	Metalurh-2 Donetsk (W)	30	5	8	17	23	56	−33	23	Withdrew
14	Vuhlyk Dymytrov	30	5	4	21	18	61	−43	19	
15	Elektron Romny (W)	30	5	1	24	13	41	−28	16	Withdrew
16	Arsenal-2 Kyiv (R, W)	30	4	4	22	24	46	−22	16	Withdrew

(C) Champions; (P) Promoted; (R) Relegated; (W) Withdrew

=== Top goalscorers ===
	Scorer	Goals (Pen.)	Team
1	Oleksandr Kozhemyachenko	15	Desna Chernihiv
2	Oleksandr Tarasenko	12	Helios Kharkiv
2	Andriy Ilyashov	12	Metalurh-2 Zaporizhzhia
2	Oleksandr Pomazanov	12	Avanhard-Inter Rovenky
5	Valentyn Krukovets	11	Desna Chernihiv
5	Volodymyr Bohdanov	11	Stal Dniproderzhynsk
5	Serhiy Kolesnyk	11	Illichivets-2 Mariupol

== See also ==
- 2003–04 Ukrainian Premier League
- 2003–04 Ukrainian First League
- 2003–04 Ukrainian Cup
