= Andriy Lopushynskyi =

Ukrainian footballer

Personal information
- Full name: Andriy Ivanovych Lopushynskyi
- Date of birth: 8 October 1974 (age 52)
- Height: 1.80 m (5 ft 11 in)
- Position: Midfielder

Senior career*
Years	Team	Apps	(Gls)
1992–1995	FC Hazovyk Komarno	54	(1)
1995–1996	FC CSKA Kyiv	24	(1)
1996–1997	FC CSKA-2 Kyiv	22	(1)
1997	FC Fakel Voronezh	2	(0)
1997	→ FC Fakel-d Voronezh (loan)	8	(1)
1998	FC Kryvbas Kryvyi Rih	5	(0)
1998	→ FC Kryvbas-2 Kryvyi Rih (loan)	9	(1)
1999–2002	FC Dynamo Lviv	90	(4)
2002	FC Enerhetyk Burshtyn	0	(0)
2003–2004	FC Tekhno-Center Rohatyn	36	(2)
- * Club domestic league appearances and goals

Andriy Ivanovych Lopushynskyi (Ukrainian: Андрій Іванович Лопушинський; born 8 October 1974) is a former Ukrainian football player.
