= Yuriy Yaskov =

Ukrainian footballer (born 1980)

Personal information
- Full name: Yuriy Volodymyrovych Yaskov
- Date of birth: 19 September 1980 (age 46)
- Place of birth: Odessa, Ukrainian SSR
- Height: 1.78 m (5 ft 10 in)
- Position: Forward

Youth career
- FC Chornomorets Odesa

Senior career*
Years	Team	Apps	(Gls)
1997–1998	MFC Lokomotiv Odesa (futsal)		
1998–1999	FC Chornomorets Odesa	10	(0)
1999	FC Kryvbas Kryvyi Rih	8	(0)
1999	→ FC Kryvbas-2 Kryvyi Rih (loan)	17	(9)
2000–2001	FC Zenit Saint Petersburg	8	(1)
2000	→ FC Zenit-d Saint Petersburg	12	(1)
2001	Dinaburg FC	0	(0)
2001–2002	FC Lasunia Odesa		
2002	FC IRIK Odesa		
2003	FC Bilyayivka		
2003	FC Lasunia Odesa		
2003–2005	FC Palmira Odesa	37	(18)
2005–2006	FC Dnister Ovidiopol	1	(0)
- * Club domestic league appearances and goals

Yuriy Volodymyrovych Yaskov (Ukrainian: Юрій Володимирович Яськов; born 19 September 1980) is a former Ukrainian football player.
