= Roman Karakevych =

Ukrainian footballer

Personal information
- Full name: Roman Vasyliovych Karakevych
- Date of birth: 13 November 1981 (age 44)
- Place of birth: Shklo, Ukrainian SSR
- Height: 1.84 m (6 ft 1/2 in)
- Position: Forward

Senior career*
Years	Team	Apps	(Gls)
2002	Bilshovyk Kyiv	3	(0)
2003–2004	Rava Rava-Ruska	33	(23)
2004–2005	Metalurh Zaporizhzhia	21	(1)
2004–2005	Metalurh-2 Zaporizhzhia	22	(9)
2006	Zorya Luhansk	17	(8)
2006	Obolon Kyiv	14	(4)
2007	Volyn Lutsk	13	(5)
2007–2008	Naftovyk-Ukrnafta Okhtyrka	32	(14)
2007–2008	Naftovyk-Ukrnafta-2 Okhtyrka	7	(4)
2009–2010	Kryvbas Kryvyi Rih	9	(3)
2010	→ Naftovyk-Ukrnafta Okhtyrka (loan)	24	(5)
2011	Sambir	1	(1)
2011	Motor Lublin	4	(2)
2012	FC Synkovychi	19	(8)
2013–2016	Girnyk Novoiavorivsk	65	(38)
2016	Dumna Remeniv		
2016	Pogoń-Sokół Lubaczów		
- * Club domestic league appearances and goals

Roman Vasyliovych Karakevych (Ukrainian: Роман Васильович Каракевич; born 13 November 1981) is a Ukrainian former professional footballer who played as a striker.
