= Yuriy Bukel =

Ukrainian footballer and coach

Personal information
- Full name: Yuriy Oleksandrovych Bukel
- Date of birth: 30 November 1971 (age 54)
- Place of birth: Odesa, Ukrainian SSR
- Height: 1.79 m (5 ft 10 in)
- Position: Defender

Youth career
- 1980s: SSSOR Chornomorets Odesa

Senior career*
Years	Team	Apps	(Gls)
1989–1996	FC Chornomorets Odesa	153	(0)
1992	FC Chornomorets-2 Odesa	11	(0)
1998	FC Metalurh Mariupol	12	(0)
1998	FC Shakhtar Makiivka	5	(0)
1999–2000	FC Chornomorets Odesa	24	(0)
1999–2000	FC Chornomorets-2 Odesa	5	(0)
2000–2001	FC Sheriff Tiraspol	25	(0)
2002	FC Signal Odesa		
2002	FC Tiraspol		
2003	FC Ivan Odesa	4	(1)
2003–2005	FC Palmira Odesa	40	(0)
2005	FC Hirnyk Kryvyi Rih	2	(0)

International career
1993–1995	Ukraine	7	(0)

Managerial career
- 2004–2005: Palmira Odesa (assistant)
- 2005: Hirnyk Kryvyi Rih (assistant)
- 2006–2008: Oleksandriya (assistant)
- 2008: Oleksandriya
- * Club domestic league appearances and goals

Yuriy Bukel (Ukrainian: Юрій Олександрович Букель, born 30 November 1971) is a former Ukrainian footballer and coach.
