= Maksym Shtayer =

Ukrainian footballer and beach football player

Personal information
- Full name: Maksym Andriyovych Shtayer
- Date of birth: 28 November 1978 (age 47)
- Place of birth: Soviet Union
- Position: Forward

Senior career*
Years	Team	Apps	(Gls)
1996	Nyva Myronivka	7	(0)
1997–00	Obolon Kyiv	69	(4)
1999–00	→Obolon-2 Kyiv	11	(0)
2001	Hirnyk-Sport Komsomolsk	5	(1)
2002–03	FC Krasyliv	48	(18)
2003–04	Spartak Ivano-Frankivsk	25	(1)
2004	→Spartak-2 Kalush	5	(2)
2004	Inter Boyarka	10	(0)
2005	MFC Mykolaiv	14	(0)
2005	Knyazha Shchaslyve	12	(1)
2006	Nyva Bershad	7	(0)
2006	Olkom Melitopol	5	(0)
2007	Ros Bila Tserkva	11	(0)
- * Club domestic league appearances and goals

Maksym Andriyovych Shtayer (Ukrainian: Максим Андрійович Штаєр; born 28 November 1978) is a retired professional Ukrainian football and beach football forward.

Shtayer became the highest scorer when he scored 15 goals for FC Krasyliv during the 2002–03 Ukrainian First League season.
