= FC Real Odesa =

SCS Real Odesa
- Full name: Sport Club School Real Odesa
- Founded: 2002
- Dissolved: 2005
- Ground: SKA Stadion, Odesa
- Capacity: ~10,000
- League: Ukrainian Second League
- 2004–05: 7th

SCS Real Odesa was a professional football club based in Odesa, Ukraine.

== History ==
The club was established in December 2002 in Odesa under the premise of a sports school who were fans of Real Madrid was created on the initiative of members of the Odesa City Council Serhiy and Anatoly Dire. They participated in the 2003 Odesa city championship and also in the Ukrainian Football Amateur League. The team also won the Winter Championship in Odesa (2003–2004) and the Odesa City Cup (2003). They applied for a professional license and were granted one. Real Odesa entered the Ukrainian Second League for the 2004–05 season. Before the 2005–06 season the club withdrew their professional license. The club colors were white and black.

== League and cup history ==
Season	Div.	Pos.	Pl.	W	D	L	GS	GA	P	Domestic Cup	Europe	Notes
2004–05	3rd "B"	7	26	9	10	7	25	27	37	1/32 finals		
