= FC Molniya Sieverodonetsk =

- Full name: Football Club Molniya Sieverodonetsk
- Founded: 2000
- Dissolved: 2005
- League: Ukrainian Second League
- 2004–05: 4th

FC Molniya Sieverodonetsk (Ukrainian: Молнія Сєвєродонецьк) was a professional football club based in Sievierodonetsk, Luhansk Oblast, Ukraine.

== History ==
The club was founded in 2000 and began playing under the Ukrainian name of Blyskavka (Ukrainian: Блискавка) in the Luhansk Oblast competition.

The team also participated in 2003 in the Ukrainian Football Amateur League and became champions.

In 2004 the team merged with Avanhard-Inter from Rovenky and after the winter break of the 2003–04 Ukrainian Second League season and competed under this name.

Molniya was granted a license and appeared under the new name in the 2004–05 Ukrainian Second League competition. At the beginning of next season team did not participate in the Championship and Cup due to insufficient funding and withdrew from the PFL. (4 August 2005)

Currently in Sieverodonetsk there exists a team called Khimik, but it is believed that a separate club with its history and traditions.

== Honors ==
Ukrainian Amateur competition (4th Level)

- 2003 Champions (as Blyskavka)

== League and cup history ==
Season	Div.	Pos.	Pl.	W	D	L	GS	GA	P	Domestic Cup	Europe	Notes
2004–05	3rd "C"	7	28	18	4	6	47	29	58			

== See also ==
- FC Khimik Sieverodonetsk
