= FC Dnipro-3 Dnipropetrovsk =

FC Dnipro-3 Dnipropetrovsk is a Ukrainian football team based in Dnipropetrovsk, Ukraine. The team is the third squad team or junior team of the FC Dnipro Dnipropetrovsk franchise.

The team had a brief stint in the Ukrainian Second Division. After the reserve club, Dnipro-2, was promoted to the Persha Liha after the 1999–2000 season, the club's administration decided to enter the third squad or junior team into the Ukrainian Second Division. However, after two seasons, the club was relegated from the professional ranks.

== League and cup history ==
Season	Div.	Pos.	Pl.	W	D	L	GS	GA	P	Domestic Cup	Europe	Notes
2000–01	3rd "B"	3	28	16	5	7	35	21	53	1/32 finals Second League Cup		
2001–02	3rd "C"	17	34	6	8	20	31	53	26			Relegated|
