= 2002–03 Ukrainian First League =

Ukrainian First League
- Season: 2002–03
- Champions: Zirka Kirovohrad
- Promoted: Zirka Kirovohrad, Borysfen Boryspil
- Relegated: Sokil Zolochiv (withdrew)
- Top goalscorer: (15) Maksym Shtayer (FC Krasyliv)

The 2002–03 Ukrainian First League was the twelfth season of the Ukrainian First League which was won by Zirka Kirovohrad. The season started on July 6, 2002, and finished on June 21, 2003.

== Promotion and relegation ==
=== Promoted teams ===
Five clubs promoted from the 2001–02 Ukrainian Second League.

Group A

- FC Krasyliv – champion (debut)
- Sokil Zolochiv – runner-up (debut)

Group B

- Systema-Boreks Borodyanka – champion (debut)

Group C

- FC Sumy – champion (returning after a season)
- Arsenal Kharkiv – runner-up (debut)

=== Relegated teams ===
One club was relegated from the 2001-02 Ukrainian Top League:

- FC Zakarpattia Uzhhorod – 14th place (returning after a season)

=== Renamed teams ===
- Before the season FC Sumy changed back to FC Spartak Sumy .
- During winter break SC Mykolaiv changed its name to MFC Mykolaiv.

=== Teams ===
In 2002-03 season, the Ukrainian First League consists of the following teams:

Locations of teams in First League

== Final table ==
Pos	Team	Pld	W	D	L	GF	GA	GD	Pts	Promotion or relegation
1	Zirka Kirovohrad (C, P)	34	22	5	7	45	22	+23	71	Promoted to Vyshcha Liha
2	Borysfen Boryspil (P)	34	19	9	6	44	16	+28	66	Promoted to Vyshcha Liha
3	Dynamo-2 Kyiv	34	18	10	6	56	28	+28	64	
4	Naftovyk Okhtyrka	34	15	9	10	37	26	+11	54	
5	MFC Mykolaiv	34	15	7	12	30	37	−7	52	
6	Stal Alchevsk	34	14	10	10	36	33	+3	52	
7	Zakarpattia Uzhhorod	34	14	9	11	27	26	+1	51	
8	FC Krasyliv	34	14	7	13	42	37	+5	49	
9	Arsenal Kharkiv	34	13	7	14	38	42	−4	46	
10	Spartak Sumy	34	13	6	15	34	40	−6	45	
11	Polissya Zhytomir	34	12	7	15	30	38	−8	43	
12	Shakhtar-2 Donetsk	34	11	9	14	33	40	−7	42	
13	Karpaty-2 Lviv	34	10	11	13	34	38	−4	41	
14	CSKA Kyiv	34	10	11	13	33	38	−5	41	
15	Systema-Boreks Borodyanka	34	9	13	12	28	28	0	40	
16	FC Vinnytsia (Note: Nyva Vinnytsia was not relegated as Olexandria has folded in the Premier League. Prykarpattya Ivano-Frankivsk was bought out by LUKOIL, the main sponsor of LUKOR Kalush, and the new management recognized it as the first team of one club with LUKOR being its second. One a paper LUKOR got promoted and Prykarpattya Ivano-Frankivsk got relegated, but the truth is that the teams stayed in their divisions. Sokil Zolochiv has folded.)	34	9	9	16	18	31	−13	36	
17	Prykarpattya Ivano-Frankivsk	34	7	8	19	25	54	−29	29	Avoided relegation
18	Sokil Zolochiv (D)	34	4	7	23	23	39	−16	19	Withdrew

(C) Champions; (D) Disqualified; (P) Promoted
Notes:

Persha Liha 2002-03 Winners
FC Zirka Kirovohrad
Second title

== Top scorers ==
Statistics are taken from here.

Scorer	Goals (pen.)	Team
(Ukraine) Maksym Shtayer	15 (4)	FC Krasyliv
(Ukraine) Artem Milevskyi	11	Dynamo-2 Kyiv
(Ukraine) Myroslav Bundash	11 (6)	Zakarpattia Uzhhorod
(Ukraine) Bohdan Yesyp	10	Naftovyk Okhtyrka
(Ukraine) Pavlo Parshyn	9 (3)	Polissya Zhytomyr
(Ukraine) Oleksandr Melaschenko	8	Dynamo-2 Kyiv
(Ukraine) Dmytro Vorobey	8 (1)	Dynamo-2 Kyiv
(Ukraine) Oleksandr Aliyev	8 (1)	Dynamo-2 Kyiv
(Ukraine) Ruslan Platon	8 (3)	Karpaty-2 Lviv
(Ukraine) Ruslan Bidnenko	7	Borysfen Boryspil
