= Oleh Teplyi =

Ukrainian footballer (born 1981)

Personal information
- Full name: Oleh Teplyi
- Date of birth: 4 August 1981 (age 45)
- Place of birth: Ralivka, Lviv Oblast, Ukrainian SSR
- Height: 1.83 m (6 ft 0 in)
- Position: Forward

Senior career*
| Years | Team | Apps | (Gls) |
| 2000 | FC Naftovyk Boryslav | 5 | (1) |
| 2000–2001 | Halychyna Drohobych | 43 | (13) |
| 2001–2002 | Sokil Zolochiv | 28 | (11) |
| 2003 | Mykolaiv | 12 | (0) |
| 2003–2005 | Hazovyk-Skala Stryi | 62 | (8) |
| 2005–2006 | Obolon Kyiv | 25 | (3) |
| 2006–2008 | Lviv | 63 | (9) |
| 2008–2009 | Nyva Ternopil | 27 | (4) |
| 2010–2012 | Beregvidek Berehove | | |
| 2013–2014 | Sambir | | |
| 2014–2015 | FC Demnia | | |
| 2016–2019 | Sambir | | |
- * Club domestic league appearances and goals

Oleh Teplyi (born 4 August 1981) is a Ukrainian former professional football striker.
