= 2001–02 Ukrainian Second League =

Ukrainian Second League
- Season: 2001–02
- Champions: (A) - Krasyliv (B) - Systema-Boreks Borodianka (C) - Sumy
- Promoted: FC Krasyliv; Systema-Boreks Borodianka; FC Sumy; Sokil Zolochiv; Arsenal Kharkiv

The 2001–02 Ukrainian Second League was the 11th season of 3rd level professional football in Ukraine.

The competitions were divided into three groups according to geographical location in the country – A is western Ukraine, B is southern Ukraine and Crimea, and C is eastern Ukraine.

The groups were won respectively by FC Krasyliv, FC Systema-Boreks Borodianka and FC Sumy.

== Team changes ==
=== Promoted ===
The following team was promoted from the 2001 Ukrainian Football Amateur League:

- FC Kovel-Volyn-2 – (debut)
- FC SKA-Orbita Lviv – (debut)
- FC Dnister Ovidiopol – (debut)
- FC Stal Dniprodzerzhynsk – (debut, previously (16 seasons ago) played in the 1985 Soviet Second League as Metalurh Dniprodzerzhynsk)

The 2000 Ukrainian Football Amateur League participant:

- FC Akademiya Irpin – (debut)

Also, eight more club was admitted additionally:

- FC Zakarpattia-2 Uzhhorod – (debut)
- FC Borysfen-2 Boryspil – (debut)
- FC Metalurh-2 Donetsk – (debut)
- FC Obolon-2 Kyiv – (returning after absence of a season)
- FC Chornohora Ivano-Frankivsk– (debut, replacing relegated FC Prykarpattia-2 Ivano-Frankivsk)
- FC Chaika-VMS Sevastopol – (returning after an absence of 6 seasons)
- FC Torpedo Zaporizhzhia – (debut, previously (10 seasons ago) played in the 1991 Soviet Second League as Torpedo Zaporizhzhia)
- FC Dynamo Simferopol – (debut)

=== Relegated ===
- FC Bukovyna Chernivtsi – (returning after an absence of a season)
- FC Cherkasy – (returning after an absence of 8 seasons, previously as Dnipro Cherkasy)
- FC Spartak Sumy – (returning after an absence of 7 seasons, previously as Yavir Krasnopillia)

=== Withdrawn ===
- FC Adoms Kremenchuk, withdrew before the season
- FC Ternopil, being a farm team of FC Nyva Ternopil, it is forced relegation as Nyva was relegated to the league for the next season
- FC Dnipro-3 Dnipropetrovsk was forced into relegation due to relegation of FC Dnipro-2 Dnipropetrovsk
- FC Chaika-VMS Sevastopol, was replaced for the next season with FC Sevastopol
- FC Frunzenets-Liha-99 Sumy was merged with FC Sumy
- FC Tsementnyk-Khorda Mykolaiv withdrew during winter break
- FC Dynamo Lviv, withdrew after the season
- FC SKA-Orbita Lviv, withdrew after the season
- FC Zakarpattia-2 Uzhhorod, withdrew after the season
- FC Portovyk Illichivsk, withdrew after the season
- FC Cherkasy, withdrew after the season
- FC Mashynobudivnyk Druzhkivka, withdrew after the season
- FC Oskil Kupyansk, withdrew after the relegation

=== Renamed / Relocated ===
- FC Kalush changed its name to FC Lukor Kalush
- FC Kovel-Volyn changed its name to FC Kovel-Volyn-2
- FC Akademiya Irpin changed its name to FC Nafkom-Akademiya Irpin
- FC Ternopil-Nyva-2 changed its name to FC Ternopil
- FC Rihonda Bila Tserkva changed its name to FC Ros Bila Tserkva
- FC Spartak Sumy changed its name to FC Sumy
- FC Karpaty-2 changed its name to FC Karpaty-3 Lviv
  - FC Lviv (1992) in the First League after merger changed to Karpaty-2
- FC Hazovyk Komarno moved to Stryi and changed its name to FC Hazovyk-Skala Stryi

== Group A ==
=== Location map ===
Locations of team home grounds in Ukrainian Second League 2001-02

=== Final standings ===
Pos	Team	Pld	W	D	L	GF	GA	GD	Pts	Promotion or relegation
1	Krasyliv (C, P)	36	28	4	4	70	21	+49	88	Promoted
2	Sokil Zolochiv (P)	36	26	5	5	80	26	+54	83	Promoted
3	Podillya Khmelnytskyi	36	27	2	7	79	31	+48	83	
4	Dynamo Lviv (W)	36	20	6	10	52	31	+21	66	Withdrew
5	LUKOR Kalush	36	19	8	9	63	35	+28	65	
6	Veres Rivne	36	18	10	8	41	23	+18	64	
7	Bukovyna Chernivtsi	36	17	8	11	40	41	−1	59	
8	Tekhno-Tsentr Rohatyn	36	16	6	14	53	58	−5	54	
9	Karpaty-3 Lviv	36	14	11	11	38	31	+7	53	
10	Hazovyk-Skala Stryi	36	12	11	13	31	38	−7	47	
11	Halychyna Drohobych	36	13	7	16	49	60	−11	46	
12	Enerhetyk Burshtyn	36	11	8	17	49	54	−5	41	
13	SKA-Orbita Lviv (W)	36	8	15	13	30	40	−10	39	Withdrew
14	Kovel-Volyn-2 Kovel	36	10	6	20	31	51	−20	36	
15	Ternopil (W)	36	9	8	19	26	49	−23	35	Withdrew
16	Naftovyk Dolyna	36	9	6	21	20	56	−36	33	
17	Zakarpattia-2 Uzhhorod (W)	36	7	6	23	32	59	−27	27	Withdrew
18	Chornohora Ivano-Frankivsk	36	6	2	28	26	83	−57	20	
19	Tsementnyk-Khorda Mykolaiv (W)	36	5	3	28	18	41	−23	18	Withdrew

(C) Champions; (P) Promoted; (W) Withdrew

=== Top goalscorers ===
	Scorer	Goals (Pen.)	Team
1	Volodymyr Kryzhanivsky	27	LUKOR Kalush
2	Oleksiy Sendel	23	Krasyliv
3	Yuriy Sulymenko	19	Bukovyna Chernivtsi
3	Serhiy Babiychuk	19	Podillya Khmelnytskyi
5	Oleh Teplyi	15	Sokil Zolochiv

== Group B ==
=== Location map ===
Locations of team home grounds in Ukrainian Second League 1992-93

=== Final standings ===
Pos	Team	Pld	W	D	L	GF	GA	GD	Pts	Promotion or relegation
1	Systema-Boreks Borodianka (C, P)	34	25	3	6	69	20	+49	78	Promoted
2	Naftovyk-Academia Irpin	34	21	7	6	59	24	+35	70	
3	Dynamo Simferopol	34	16	5	13	54	50	+4	53	
4	Olkom Melitopol	34	14	10	10	42	33	+9	52	
5	Dnister Ovidiopol	34	13	12	9	48	38	+10	51	
6	Dynamo-3 Kyiv	34	15	6	13	34	34	0	51	
7	Portovyk Illichivsk (W)	34	14	8	12	37	31	+6	50	Withdrew
8	Ros Bila Tserkva	34	13	10	11	36	30	+6	49	
9	Kherson	34	12	13	9	34	23	+11	49	
10	Metalurh-2 Zaporizhzhia	34	14	6	14	35	35	0	48	
11	Cherkasy (W)	34	11	8	15	30	28	+2	41	Withdrew
12	Chornomorets-2 Odesa	34	10	11	13	29	34	−5	41	
13	Tytan Armyansk	34	12	4	18	26	53	−27	40	
14	Olimpia AES Yuzhnoukrainsk	34	11	7	16	38	48	−10	40	
15	Borysfen-2 Boryspil	34	11	7	16	38	48	−10	40	
16	Obolon-2 Kyiv	34	11	7	16	38	48	−10	40	
17	Hirnyk-Sport Komsomolsk	34	11	7	16	38	48	−10	40	
18	Chaika-Navy Sevastopol (R, W)	34	11	7	16	38	48	−10	40	Withdrew

(C) Champions; (P) Promoted; (R) Relegated; (W) Withdrew

=== Top goalscorers ===
	Scorer	Goals (Pen.)	Team
1	Oleksandr Antonenko	17	Systema-Boreks Borodianka
2	Oleksandr Kapusta	16	Olkom Melitopol
2	Serhiy Mamonov	16	Dynamo Simferopol
4	Stanislav Popov	15	Dynamo-3 Kyiv
4	Oleksandr Sydorenko	15	Systema-Boreks Borodianka

== Group C ==
=== Location map ===
Locations of team home grounds in Ukrainian Second League 1992-93

=== Final standings ===
Pos	Team	Pld	W	D	L	GF	GA	GD	Pts	Promotion or relegation
1	Sumy	34	25	3	6	69	20	+49	78	
2	Arsenal Kharkiv	34	21	7	6	59	24	+35	70	
3	Metalurh-2 Donetsk	34	16	5	13	54	50	+4	53	
4	Desna Chernihiv	34	14	10	10	42	33	+9	52	
5	Frunzenets-Liha-99 Sumy	34	13	12	9	48	38	+10	51	Withdrew
6	Mashbud Druzhkivka	34	15	6	13	34	34	0	51	Withdrew
7	Shakhtar-3 Donetsk	34	14	8	12	37	31	+6	50	
8	Elektron Romny	34	13	10	11	36	30	+6	49	
9	Zorya Luhansk	34	12	13	9	34	23	+11	49	
10	Metalist-2 Kharkiv	34	14	6	14	35	35	0	48	
11	Vorskla-2 Poltava	34	11	8	15	30	28	+2	41	
12	Stal Dniprodzerzhynsk	34	10	11	13	29	34	−5	41	
13	Stal-2 Alchevsk	34	12	4	18	26	53	−27	40	
14	Metalurh-2 Mariupol	34	11	7	16	38	48	−10	40	
15	Torpedo Zaporizhzhia	34	11	7	16	38	48	−10	40	
16	Avanhard Rovenky	34	11	7	16	38	48	−10	40	
17	Dnipro-3 Dnipropetrovsk	34	11	7	16	38	48	−10	40	Withdrew
18	Oskil Kupyansk (R)	34	11	7	16	38	48	−10	40	

(R) Relegated

=== Top goalscorers ===
	Scorer	Goals (Pen.)	Team
1	Oleksiy Yakymenko	17	Frunzenets Sumy
2	Oleksandr Kozhemyachenko	15	Desna Chernihiv
3	Gela Gabisonia	14	Sumy
3	Rais Terkulov	14	Mashynobudivnyk Druzhkivka
5	Agboh Patrick Umomo	12	Metalurh-2 Donetsk
