= FC Rohatyn =

Tekhno-Center Rohatyn
- Full name: Tekhno-Center Rohatyn
- Founded: 1998
- Dissolved: 2005
- League: Ukrainian Second League
- 2004–05: 8th

FC Rohatyn was a professional Ukrainian football club from Rohatyn, Rohatyn Raion, Ivano-Frankivsk Oblast. The club played in the Ukrainian Second League from the 2000–01 season until they withdrew after the 2004–05 season.

== Honors ==
Ukrainian Amateur Championships

- Runners-up 1999

Ivano-Frankivsk Oblast Championship

- Champions 1999 (autumn)

== League and cup history ==
Season	Div.	Pos.	Pl.	W	D	L	GS	GA	P	Domestic Cup	Europe	Notes
2000–01	3rd "A"	6	30	16	2	12	44	32	50			
2001–02	3rd "A"	8	36	16	6	14	53	58	54			
2002–03	3rd "A"	11	28	7	7	14	23	35	28			
2003–04	3rd "A"	4	30	16	6	8	39	29	54			
2004–05	3rd "A"	8	28	12	6	10	33	29	42			
