= 2000–01 Ukrainian Second League =

Ukrainian Second League
- Season: 2000–01
- Champions: (A) - Polissya Zhytomyr (B) - Obolon Kyiv (C) - Naftovyk Okhtyrka

The 2000–01 Ukrainian Second League was the tenth season of 3rd level professional football in Ukraine.

The competitions were divided into three groups according to geographical location in the country – A is western Ukraine, B is southern Ukraine and Crimea, and C is eastern Ukraine.

The groups were won respectively by FC Polissya Zhytomyr, FC Obolon Kyiv and FC Naftovyk Okhtyrka.

== Team changes ==
=== Promoted ===
The following team were promoted from the 2000 Ukrainian Football Amateur League:

- FC Tekhno-Tsentr Rohatyn – (debut)
- FC Frunzenets-Liha-99 Sumy – (debut, previously (17 seasons ago) played in the 1983 Soviet Second League as Frunzenets Sumy)

Also, eight more clubs were admitted additionally:

- FC Krasyliv – (debut)
- FC Sokil Zolochiv – (debut)
- FC Ternopil-Nyva-2 – (debut)
- FC Dnipro-3 Dnipropetrovsk – (debut)
- FC Cherkasy-2– (debut)
- FC Shakhtar-3 Donetsk – (debut)
- FC Metalurh-2 Mariupol – (debut)
- SSSOR-Metalurh Zaporizhzhia – (debut)
- FC Stal-2 Alchevsk– (debut)

=== Relegated ===
The following team were relegated from the 1999–2000 Ukrainian First League:

- FC Polissya Zhytomyr – (returning after an absence of 7 seasons)
- FC Naftovyk Okhtyrka – (returning after an absence of 11 seasons, previously in the 1989 Soviet tier–3 competitions)
- FC Obolon Kyiv – (returning after an absence of a season)
- FC Chornomorets-2 Odesa – (returning after an absence of 5 seasons)

== Group A ==
=== Location map ===
Locations of team home grounds in Ukrainian Second League 2000–01
Home venues of teams in the 2000–01 Ukrainian Second League in Galicia

=== Final standings ===
Pos	Team	Pld	W	D	L	GF	GA	GD	Pts	Promotion or relegation
1	Polissya Zhytomyr (P)	30	22	4	4	61	18	+43	70	Promoted to First League
2	Sokil Zolochiv	30	20	8	2	48	6	+42	68	
3	Krasyliv (Note: Krasyliv RSSSF show number of draws as 6, correct number is 5.)	30	19	5	6	53	25	+28	62	
4	Dynamo Lviv	30	15	6	9	34	25	+9	51	
5	Tsementnyk-Khorda Mykolaiv	30	16	3	11	41	29	+12	51	
6	Tekhno-Centre Rohatyn	30	16	2	12	44	32	+12	50	
7	Dynamo-3 Kyiv	30	12	10	8	26	16	+10	46	
8	Karpaty-2 Lviv (P)	30	13	3	14	45	35	+10	42	Promoted to First League
9	Enerhetyk Burshtyn	30	11	8	11	34	34	0	41	
10	Hazovyk Komarno	30	9	10	11	26	38	−12	37	
11	Ternopil-Nyva-2	30	8	7	15	26	52	−26	31	
12	Veres Rivne (Note: Veres Rivne RSSSF shows Veres with 8 wins. Correct number is 7. A matchday 29 game on 16 June 2001 between Veres Rivne and Kalush was changed from 3-1 to -/+.)	30	7	6	17	26	52	−26	27	
13	Naftovyk Dolyna	30	6	8	16	34	43	−9	26	
14	Halychyna Drohobych	30	6	6	18	29	48	−19	24	
15	Kalush (Note: Kalush RSSSF shows Kalush as a relegated team. A matchday 29 game on 16 June 2001 between Veres Rivne and Kalush was changed from 3-1 to -/+.)	30	7	2	21	26	74	−48	23	
16	Prykarpattia-2 Ivano-Frankivsk (Note: Prykarpattia-2 Ivano-Frankivsk RSSSF shows Kalush as a relegated team. Correct team is Prykarpattia-2) (R)	30	5	8	17	16	42	−26	23	Relegated to Amateurs

Source: RSSSF
(P) Promoted; (R) Relegated

== Results ==
Home \ Away	ZHY	SZO	KRA	DLV	MYK	TCR	D3K	K3L	EBU	HZV	TNP	VER	NDO	HDR	KAL	P2IF
Polissya Zhytomyr	—	1–0	2–0	2–1	3–2	2–1	1–1	1–0	2–0	6–1	3–0	3–1	1–0	2–0	5–0	5–0
Sokil Zolochiv	2–0	—	1–0	0–0	2–1	1–0	0–0	1–0	5–0	4–1	2–0	2–1	2–0	4–0	3–0	0–0
Krasyliv	3–4	0–0	—	3–1	1–1	1–0	2–0	1–0	2–0	2–0	7–1	2–0	2–1	1–0	3–0	2–1
Dynamo Lviv	0–1	0–1	4–3	—	1–0	1–0	1–0	3–0	2–1	1–0	1–0	3–0	1–1	+/-	4–1	1–0
Tsementnyk-Khorda Mykolaiv	1–2	0–3	1–0	0–0	—	2–1	1–0	1–0	2–1	2–0	2–0	1–0	3–1	3–1	4–0	2–0
Tekhno-Centre Rohatyn	1–3	0–2	2–1	2–1	2–1	—	1–2	0–1	0–0	3–2	5–0	2–1	1–0	2–1	4–0	3–1
Dynamo-3 Kyiv	2–0	0–0	0–0	1–0	0–2	4–0	—	3–2	0–0	0–1	0–1	0–1	4–0	1–0	2–0	1–0
Karpaty-2 Lviv	1–0	0–2	0–2	0–1	3–1	0–3	0–2	—	2–1	0–0	7–0	6–1	1–0	3–2	4–1	2–0
Enerhetyk Burshtyn	0–0	1–0	1–1	0–1	0–2	0–1	0–0	1–0	—	0–0	2–1	2–2	3–2	4–1	5–1	1–1
Hazovyk Komarno	0–0	0–0	0–1	0–0	1–0	2–1	0–0	0–2	1–0	—	2–0	3–2	0–1	2–1	4–2	0–0
Ternopil-Nyva-2	0–0	0–1	0–2	1–1	1–2	1–1	0–1	2–1	0–1	3–3	—	1–1	1–0	3–0	2–1	1–0
Veres Rivne	1–0	0–0	1–2	2–1	2–1	0–3	0–0	0–4	1–3	1–2	1–2	—	1–0	2–0	-/+	1–0
Naftovyk Dolyna	0–1	1–1	2–2	4–1	0–1	1–2	0–0	1–1	2–1	4–0	1–2	2–2	—	1–1	2–4	0–0
Halychyna Drohobych	0–3	0–1	1–2	0–0	2–2	1–0	3–1	3–3	1–2	0–0	2–1	3–0	0–1	—	3–1	1–1
Kalush	0–3	0–6	0–3	0–2	1–0	0–1	0–0	2–1	1–3	2–1	1–1	3–0	2–5	0–1	—	2–0
Prykarpattia-2 Ivano-Frankivsk	0–5	0–2	1–2	2–1	1–0	0–2	0–1	0–1	0–1	0–0	1–1	1–1	2–1	2–1	2–1	—

Source: uafootball.net.ua
Legend: Blue = home team win; Yellow = draw; Red = away team win.

== Group B ==
=== Location map ===
Locations of team home grounds in Ukrainian Second League 1992-93

=== Final standings ===
Pos	Team	Pld	W	D	L	GF	GA	GD	Pts	Promotion or relegation
1	Obolon Kyiv (P)	28	21	4	3	51	14	+37	67	Promoted to First League
2	Systema-Boreks Borodyanka	28	18	8	2	46	15	+31	62	
3	Dnipro-3 Dnipropetrovsk	28	16	5	7	35	21	+14	53	
4	Tytan Armiansk	28	14	8	6	38	21	+17	50	
5	Ryhonda Bila Tserkva	28	16	2	10	34	27	+7	50	
6	Podillya Khmelnytskyi	28	15	2	11	37	28	+9	47	
7	Kherson	28	12	6	10	26	33	−7	42	
8	Metalurh-2 Zaporizhzhia	28	12	5	11	51	38	+13	41	
9	Olimpiya AES Pivdenoukrainsk	28	10	4	14	21	33	−12	34	
10	Hirnyk-Sport Komsomolsk	28	9	4	15	26	45	−19	31	
11	Portovyk Illichivsk	28	7	5	16	26	40	−14	26	
12	Olkom Melitopol	28	6	7	15	18	48	−30	25	
13	Chornomorets-2 Odesa	28	7	4	17	18	47	−29	25	
14	Cherkasy-2	28	6	3	19	14	39	−25	21	
15	Kryvbas-2 Kryvyi Rih (R)	28	6	3	19	28	20	+8	21	Relegated to Amateurs

Source: RSSSF
(P) Promoted; (R) Relegated

== Results ==
Home \ Away	OBK	IBO	D3D	TAR	ROS	POD	KRK	M2Z	YZH	HIS	PIL	OLM	ODE	CH2	K2K
Obolon Kyiv	—	0–0	3–1	0–0	1–0	1–0	3–0	3–1	2–0	6–0	2–0	4–0	3–0	3–2	+/-
Systema-Boreks Borodyanka	1–1	—	2–1	1–1	1–0	2–1	4–1	0–0	1–0	2–0	2–1	0–0	3–0	1–0	5–1
Dnipro-3 Dnipropetrovsk	1–2	2–1	—	0–0	3–0	1–1	3–0	0–0	1–0	4–2	2–1	2–0	2–1	1–0	+/-
Tytan Armiansk	0–1	0–0	1–0	—	1–0	2–0	0–0	3–2	1–0	2–0	3–0	3–0	6–0	3–0	+/-
Ryhonda Bila Tserkva	1–0	0–3	0–1	1–1	—	1–0	3–1	2–1	2–0	3–0	3–1	2–0	1–0	1–0	3–0
Podillya Khmelnytskyi	2–1	2–0	0–0	4–1	0–1	—	3–0	2–0	1–2	2–0	1–0	2–0	1–0	3–1	+/-
Kherson	1–2	0–3	1–0	1–0	2–0	2–1	—	1–3	3–0	2–0	2–2	1–1	3–1	1–0	1–0
Metalurh-2 Zaporizhzhia	1–0	2–2	0–1	4–0	3–1	4–2	2–0	—	3–2	2–4	4–1	6–1	6–1	3–0	+/-
Olimpiya AES Pivdenoukrainsk	0–2	0–2	0–1	0–4	1–0	0–1	0–0	2–0	—	1–0	3–0	2–0	3–1	1–1	1–1
Hirnyk-Sport Komsomolsk	1–2	1–3	7–2	0–2	1–1	1–2	2–1	0–0	1–0	—	3–0	0–1	4–0	2–1	1–0
Portovyk Illichivsk	0–2	0–1	0–1	1–0	1–2	1–2	1–1	1–1	0–1	3–0	—	3–1	1–0	4–0	+/-
Olkom Melitopol	1–4	0–2	1–1	1–2	2–1	1–2	0–1	1–1	3–1	0–0	1–1	—	2–0	1–0	+/-
Chornomorets-2 Odesa	0–1	1–1	2–1	0–0	2–2	1–0	0–1	2–1	0–1	1–1	3–0	0–1	—	1–0	0–2
Cherkasy-2	0–1	1–3	0–2	0–1	1–2	0–3	1–0	1–0	0–0	4–1	+/-	0–0	0–1	—	1–0
Kryvbas-2 Kryvyi Rih	1–1	-/+	3–2	4–2	-/+	4–0	-/+	4–1	-/+	-/+	2–2	6–0	-/+	-/+	—

Source: uafootball.net.ua
Legend: Blue = home team win; Yellow = draw; Red = away team win.

== Group C ==
=== Location map ===
Locations of team home grounds in Ukrainian Second League 1992-93

=== Final standings ===
Pos	Team	Pld	W	D	L	GF	GA	GD	Pts	Promotion or relegation
1	Naftovyk Okhtyrka (P)	30	24	3	3	65	20	+45	75	Promoted to First League
2	Desna Chernihiv	30	18	5	7	66	29	+37	59	
3	Oskil Kupyansk (Note: Oskil Kupyansk RSSSF show number of goals scored as 50, Naftovyk Okhtyrka historical season page shows 40.)	30	16	8	6	40	24	+16	56	
4	Arsenal Kharkiv	30	15	7	8	55	27	+28	52	
5	Zorya Luhansk	30	15	5	10	49	35	+14	50	
6	Elektron Romny	30	13	8	9	33	31	+2	47	
7	Frunzenets-Liha-99 Sumy	30	11	10	9	36	32	+4	43	
8	Shakhtar-3 Donetsk	30	11	7	12	32	38	−6	40	
9	Metalist-2 Kharkiv	30	11	7	12	39	43	−4	40	
10	Vorskla-2 Poltava	30	10	6	14	52	56	−4	36	
11	Avanhard Rovenky	30	9	8	13	31	43	−12	35	
12	Mashbud Druzhkivka	30	8	10	12	29	32	−3	34	
13	Metalurh-2 Mariupol	30	9	7	14	32	47	−15	34	
14	Adoms Kremenchuk (R)	30	7	7	16	24	38	−14	28	Withdrew
15	Stal-2 Alchevsk	30	8	1	21	24	49	−25	25	
16	SSSOR-Metalurh Zaporizhzhia (R)	30	3	5	22	17	80	−63	14	Relegated to Amateurs

Source: RSSSF
(P) Promoted; (R) Relegated

== Results ==
Home \ Away	NOK	DES	OKU	KHA	ZOR	ERO	FSU	SH3	M2K	V2P	AVR	MDR	IL2	AKR	S2A	SMZ
Naftovyk Okhtyrka	—	0–1	1–0	2–1	2–0	2–1	2–0	1–1	1–0	2–1	2–0	2–0	3–0	5–1	3–0	6–0
Desna Chernihiv	1–1	—	0–1	2–0	2–0	4–0	3–0	5–0	4–2	6–1	4–1	3–1	4–0	1–0	4–3	4–1
Oskil Kupyansk	1–2	2–1	—	1–1	4–0	2–2	1–0	2–0	2–1	1–0	3–0	1–1	3–0	1–0	1–0	2–0
Arsenal Kharkiv	1–0	1–0	0–2	—	3–1	3–0	0–0	3–0	4–1	5–0	1–0	3–0	2–1	1–1	3–1	7–0
Zorya Luhansk	2–0	1–0	2–0	2–1	—	3–0	1–1	3–0	2–0	2–1	1–1	3–2	4–0	6–0	2–1	5–0
Elektron Romny	1–2	0–0	1–0	1–0	0–0	—	4–1	1–0	3–2	3–1	1–1	1–1	2–1	+/-	3–0	3–0
Frunzenets-Liha-99 Sumy	2–3	1–0	0–1	0–0	2–0	1–1	—	4–1	2–0	3–2	1–0	2–2	4–2	0–0	2–0	1–0
Shakhtar-3 Donetsk	0–3	1–1	0–1	1–1	3–1	0–1	0–0	—	3–0	0–0	1–0	2–1	1–2	2–0	1–0	3–0
Metalist-2 Kharkiv	0–3	6–3	0–0	0–2	2–1	0–0	2–0	0–1	—	1–1	1–1	1–0	2–2	3–0	3–1	5–0
Vorskla-2 Poltava	1–4	1–3	7–2	2–0	1–3	3–0	2–1	1–4	1–1	—	1–1	1–1	4–1	2–1	1–0	3–0
Avanhard Rovenky	0–1	2–3	1–1	3–2	1–1	+/-	2–1	2–2	0–1	0–6	—	0–2	4–1	2–1	1–2	2–2
Mashbud Druzhkivka	1–2	0–0	0–0	1–0	2–0	1–1	1–1	1–2	1–2	4–2	0–1	—	1–0	1–0	1–0	0–0
Metalurh-2 Mariupol	0–3	0–1	1–1	2–2	0–0	1–0	1–1	0–0	4–0	3–1	0–1	0–0	—	+/-	1–0	5–2
Adoms Kremenchuk	2–3	1–1	0–3	1–1	3–0	1–0	0–0	0–2	0–1	1–1	1–0	1–0	1–0	—	1–1	3–0
Stal-2 Alchevsk	1–3	0–5	1–0	0–1	1–2	1–2	1–3	1–0	1–2	2–0	0–2	1–0	0–2	1–0	—	2–0
SSSOR-Metalurh Zaporizhzhia	1–1	2–0	1–1	2–6	2–1	0–1	0–2	3–1	0–0	1–4	0–2	0–3	0–2	0–3	0–2	—

Source: uafootball.net.ua
Legend: Blue = home team win; Yellow = draw; Red = away team win.
