= FC Palmira Odesa =

Palmira Odesa
- Full name: Football Club Palmira Odesa
- Founded: 1999
- Ground: Spartak Stadium, Odesa
- Capacity: 4,800
- League: Ukrainian Second League

FC Palmira Odesa is a football club based in Odesa, Ukraine.

== History ==
The club was founded in 1999 under the name Chornomorets-Lasunia, then was simply called Lasunia. In 2003, for a short period the club was called Lasunia-Transservice before renaming themselves to Palmira. Since 2003, the club had professional license and has participated in regional competitions. The team competed in the Ukrainian Second League in the 2003–04 and 2004–05. Before the 2005–06 season, the club withdrew its professional license. Their home matches were held at Spartak Stadium. For the 2025–26 Ukrainian Cup, there appeared as Palmira Odesa.

== League and cup history ==
Season	Div.	Pos.	Pl.	W	D	L	GS	GA	P	Domestic Cup	Europe	Notes
2003–04	3rd "B"	6	30	13	2	15	34	37	41	1/16 finals		
2004–05	3rd "B"	5	26	12	7	7	31	25	43	1/32 finals		
2025–26										1/64 finals		
2026–27										1/32 finals		

== Crest ==
Crests of FC Palmira Odesa
Crest used 2003–2005

Crest in use since 2019
