= 2003 Ukrainian Football Amateur League =

Ukrainian Football Amateur League
- Season: 2003
- Champions: Molniya Sieverodonetsk (1st title) KZEZO Kakhovka (runner-up)
- Runner up: FC KZEZO Kakhovka, FC Hirnyk Kryvyi Rih
- Promoted: 9 – Krymteplytsia, Rava, Ikva, Nyva-2, Hazovyk-KhHV, Helios, Cherkasy, Vodnyk, Molniya

Following are the results of the Ukrainian Football Amateur League 2003 season. Participation is restricted to the regional (Oblast) champions and/or the most regarded team by the respective regional association.

This season competition consisted of four stages as the previous. Few little changes were added this season's format. First two stages were organized in regional principal and were played in two rounds where each team could play another at its home ground. On the first stage each group winners and their immediate runners-up were to advance to the next part of the competition. The second stage was split in four groups where first two places were advancing to the semifinals. On the second stage teams that played each other in the previous one kept their result from the first stage. The semifinals and finals, on the other hand, were played in one round and this year were organized in the cities of Severodonetsk and Rubizhne. The semifinals, in their turn, were split in two groups where first two teams were advancing to the winners final of four. And as the qualifying stages (the first two) the teams that played in semifinals did not play in the final as their results were kept from that stage.

Note: ZALK stands for the Zaporizhzhian Aliuminum Plant (Kombinat in Ukrainian).
KZEZO stands for the Kakhovkan Factory (Zavod) of Electro-Welding Equipment (Elektro-Zvariuvalnoho Obladnannia).

== Teams ==
=== Debut ===
List of teams that are debuting this season in the league.

=== Withdrawn ===
List of clubs that took part in last year competition, but chose not to participate in 2003 season:

=== Location map ===
Location of participating teams in the 2009 Ukrainian amateur championship

== First stage ==
Note: Some records are not full.

=== Group A ===
| Pos | Team | Pld | W | D | L | GF | GA | GD | Pts | Qualification |
|---|---|---|---|---|---|---|---|---|---|---|
| 1 | Rava Rava-Ruska | 8 | 5 | 0 | 3 | 8 | 8 | 0 | 15 | joined Druha Liha |
| 2 | Merkuriy CHTEI Chernivtsi | 8 | 3 | 3 | 2 | 7 | 4 | +3 | 12 | Second Stage |
| 3 | Ikva Mlyniv | 8 | 3 | 1 | 4 | 11 | 9 | +2 | 10 | joined Druha Liha |
| 4 | Luzhany | 8 | 3 | 1 | 4 | 7 | 13 | −6 | 10 | Second Stage |
| 5 | Teplovyk Ivano-Frankivsk | 8 | 2 | 3 | 3 | 7 | 6 | +1 | 9 | |

Source: RSSSF

Note: Four games were forfeited.

=== Group B ===
| Pos | Team | Pld | W | D | L | GF | GA | GD | Pts | Qualification |
|---|---|---|---|---|---|---|---|---|---|---|
| 1 | Fakel Varva | 10 | 8 | 1 | 1 | 28 | 8 | +20 | 25 | Second Stage |
| 2 | KLO-CSKA Bucha | 10 | 5 | 2 | 3 | 16 | 12 | +4 | 17 | Second Stage |
| 3 | Dnipro Kyiv | 10 | 5 | 2 | 3 | 11 | 7 | +4 | 17 | Second Stage |
| 4 | Lokomotyv Zdolbuniv | 10 | 4 | 1 | 5 | 16 | 15 | +1 | 13 | |
| 5 | Prylad-LDTU Lutsk | 10 | 4 | 1 | 5 | 11 | 18 | −7 | 13 | |
| 6 | Dovira-Nyva Vinnytsia | 10 | 0 | 1 | 9 | 0 | 22 | −22 | 1 | withdrew |

Source: RSSSF

Note: Dovira-Nyva Vinnytsia forfeited 6 games.

=== Group C ===
| Pos | Team | Pld | W | D | L | GF | GA | GD | Pts | Qualification |
|---|---|---|---|---|---|---|---|---|---|---|
| 1 | Helios Kharkiv | 8 | 6 | 1 | 1 | 15 | 3 | +12 | 19 | joined Druha Liha |
| 2 | Cherkasy | 8 | 6 | 1 | 1 | 17 | 6 | +11 | 19 | joined Druha Liha |
| 3 | Nizhyn | 8 | 3 | 1 | 4 | 8 | 12 | −4 | 10 | withdrew |
| 4 | Evropa Pryliuky | 8 | 1 | 4 | 3 | 6 | 9 | −3 | 7 | Second Stage |
| 5 | Ikar MAKBO 94 Kirovohrad | 8 | 0 | 1 | 7 | 3 | 19 | −16 | 1 | withdrew |

Source: RSSSF

Note: Last two games Ikar MAKBO 94 Kirovohrad forfeited.
Nizhyn withdrew after this qualification.

=== Group D ===
| Pos | Team | Pld | W | D | L | GF | GA | GD | Pts | Qualification |
|---|---|---|---|---|---|---|---|---|---|---|
| 1 | Molniya Sieverodonetsk | 8 | 7 | 1 | 0 | 14 | 1 | +13 | 22 | Second Stage |
| 2 | Hazovyk Kharkiv | 8 | 5 | 1 | 2 | 17 | 9 | +8 | 16 | joined Druha Liha |
| 3 | Shakhtar Sverdlovsk | 8 | 2 | 1 | 5 | 6 | 12 | −6 | 7 | Second Stage |
| 4 | Naftovyk-2 Okhtyrka | 8 | 2 | 1 | 5 | 4 | 10 | −6 | 7 | Second Stage |
| 5 | Torez | 8 | 1 | 2 | 5 | 6 | 15 | −9 | 5 | |

Source: RSSSF

=== Group E ===
| Pos | Team | Pld | W | D | L | GF | GA | GD | Pts | Qualification |
|---|---|---|---|---|---|---|---|---|---|---|
| 1 | KZEZO Kakhovka | 8 | 6 | 1 | 1 | 18 | 11 | +7 | 19 | Second Stage |
| 2 | Krymteplitsa Molodizhne | 8 | 4 | 2 | 2 | 9 | 5 | +4 | 14 | joined Druha Liha |
| 3 | Ivan Odesa | 8 | 3 | 2 | 3 | 10 | 11 | −1 | 11 | Second Stage |
| 4 | ZALK Zaporizhzhia | 8 | 2 | 1 | 5 | 11 | 13 | −2 | 7 | |
| 5 | Kolos Stepove | 8 | 1 | 2 | 5 | 5 | 13 | −8 | 5 | |

Source: RSSSF

=== Group F ===
| Pos | Team | Pld | W | D | L | GF | GA | GD | Pts | Qualification |
|---|---|---|---|---|---|---|---|---|---|---|
| 1 | Hirnyk Kryvyi Rih | 8 | 5 | 2 | 1 | 19 | 8 | +11 | 17 | Second Stage |
| 2 | UkrRichFlot Kherson | 8 | 4 | 1 | 3 | 11 | 10 | +1 | 13 | Second Stage |
| 3 | Vodnyk Mykolaiv | 8 | 4 | 0 | 4 | 11 | 10 | +1 | 12 | joined Druha Liha |
| 4 | Real Odesa | 8 | 3 | 1 | 4 | 9 | 11 | −2 | 10 | Second Stage |
| 5 | DPA-TETs Cherkasy | 8 | 2 | 0 | 6 | 4 | 15 | −11 | 6 | |

Source: RSSSF

== Second stage ==
=== Group 1 ===
| Pos | Team | Pld | W | D | L | GF | GA | GD | Pts | Qualification |
|---|---|---|---|---|---|---|---|---|---|---|
| 1 | Fakel Varva | 8 | 4 | 2 | 2 | 15 | 9 | +6 | 14 | withdrew |
| 2 | Merkuriy CHTEI Chernivtsi | 8 | 4 | 2 | 2 | 8 | 5 | +3 | 14 | Semifinals |
| 3 | Luzhany | 8 | 4 | 0 | 4 | 12 | 12 | 0 | 12 | Semifinals |
| 3 | Dnipro Kyiv | 8 | 2 | 2 | 4 | 7 | 11 | −4 | 8 | |
| 3 | KLO Bucha | 8 | 2 | 2 | 4 | 5 | 10 | −5 | 8 | Semifinals |

Source: RSSSF

Note: KLO-CSKA Bucha changed to FC KLO Bucha.
KLO Bucha replaced Fakel Varva in Semifinals.

=== Group 2 ===
| Pos | Team | Pld | W | D | L | GF | GA | GD | Pts | Qualification |
|---|---|---|---|---|---|---|---|---|---|---|
| 1 | Molniya Severodonetsk | 6 | 4 | 2 | 0 | 9 | 1 | +8 | 14 | Semifinals |
| 2 | Naftovyk-2 Okhtyrka | 6 | 2 | 1 | 3 | 4 | 5 | −1 | 7 | Semifinals |
| 3 | Shakhtar Sverdlovsk | 6 | 2 | 1 | 3 | 5 | 7 | −2 | 7 | |
| 4 | Evropa Pryliuky | 6 | 1 | 2 | 3 | 4 | 9 | −5 | 5 | |

Source: RSSSF

=== Group 3 ===
| Pos | Team | Pld | W | D | L | GF | GA | GD | Pts | Qualification |
|---|---|---|---|---|---|---|---|---|---|---|
| 1 | KZEZO Kakhovka | 8 | 4 | 2 | 2 | 12 | 4 | +8 | 14 | Semifinals |
| 2 | Ivan Odesa | 8 | 4 | 1 | 3 | 14 | 11 | +3 | 13 | Semifinals |
| 3 | Hirnyk Kryvyi Rih | 8 | 3 | 4 | 1 | 14 | 11 | +3 | 13 | Semifinals |
| 4 | Real Odesa | 8 | 2 | 2 | 4 | 7 | 10 | −3 | 8 | |
| 5 | UkrRichFlot Kherson | 8 | 1 | 1 | 6 | 9 | 20 | −11 | 4 | |

Source: RSSSF

== Semifinals ==
=== Group 1 ===
| Pos | Team | Pld | W | D | L | GF | GA | GD | Pts | Qualification |
|---|---|---|---|---|---|---|---|---|---|---|
| 1 | Molniya Sieverodonetsk | 3 | 3 | 0 | 0 | 12 | 5 | +7 | 9 | Final |
| 2 | KZEZO Kakhovka | 3 | 2 | 0 | 1 | 11 | 3 | +8 | 6 | Final |
| 3 | Merkuriy CHTEI Chernivtsi | 3 | 1 | 0 | 2 | 5 | 9 | −4 | 3 | |
| 4 | KLO Bucha | 3 | 0 | 0 | 3 | 1 | 12 | −11 | 0 | |

Source: RSSSF

=== Group 2 ===
| Pos | Team | Pld | W | D | L | GF | GA | GD | Pts | Qualification |
|---|---|---|---|---|---|---|---|---|---|---|
| 1 | Hirnyk Kryvyi Rih | 3 | 2 | 1 | 0 | 6 | 1 | +5 | 7 | Final |
| 2 | Luzhany | 3 | 2 | 0 | 1 | 9 | 9 | 0 | 6 | Final |
| 3 | Ivan Odesa | 3 | 1 | 1 | 1 | 6 | 4 | +2 | 4 | |
| 4 | Naftovyk-2 Okhtyrka | 3 | 0 | 0 | 3 | 3 | 10 | −7 | 0 | |

Source: RSSSF

== Final Group ==
| Pos | Team | Pld | W | D | L | GF | GA | GD | Pts | Qualification |
|---|---|---|---|---|---|---|---|---|---|---|
| 1 | Molniya Sieverodonetsk | 3 | 2 | 1 | 0 | 7 | 3 | +4 | 7 | Champion |
| 2 | KZEZO Kakhovka | 3 | 2 | 0 | 1 | 8 | 5 | +3 | 6 | |
| 3 | Hirnyk Kryvyi Rih | 3 | 1 | 1 | 1 | 6 | 4 | +2 | 4 | |
| 4 | Luzhany | 3 | 0 | 0 | 3 | 1 | 10 | −9 | 0 | |

Source: RSSSF

== Number of teams by region ==
| Number | Region | Team(s) |
|---|---|---|
| 3 | Chernihiv Oblast | Fakel Varva, FC Nizhyn, Yevropa Pryluky |
| 2 | Cherkasy Oblast | FC Cherkasy, DPA-TETs Cherkasy |
| 2 | Chernivtsi Oblast | FC Luzhany, Merkuriy-ChTEI Chernivtsi |
| 2 | Kharkiv Oblast | Helios Kharkiv, Hazovyk-KhHV Kharkiv |
| 2 | Kherson Oblast | KZEZO Kakhovka, Ukrrichflot Kherson |
| 2 | Kyiv | Dnipro, KLO-CSKA Bucha |
| 2 | Luhansk Oblast | Molnia Severodonetsk, Shakhtar Sverdlovsk |
| 2 | Mykolaiv Oblast | Kolos Stepove, Vodnyk Mykolaiv |
| 2 | Odesa Oblast | Ivan Odesa, Real Odesa |
| 2 | Rivne Oblast | Ikva Mlyniv, Lokomotyv Zdolbuniv |
| 1 | Autonomous Republic of Crimea | Krymteplytsia Molodizhne |
| 1 | Dnipropetrovsk Oblast | Hirnyk Kryvyi Rih |
| 1 | Donetsk Oblast | FC Torez |
| 1 | Ivano-Frankivsk Oblast | Teplovyk Ivano-Frankivsk |
| 1 | Kirovohrad Oblast | Ikar Kirovohrad |
| 1 | Lviv Oblast | Rava Rava-Ruska |
| 1 | Sumy Oblast | Naftovyk-2 Okhtyrka |
| 1 | Vinnytsia Oblast | Dovira-Nyva Vinnytsia |
| 1 | Volyn Oblast | Prylad-LDTU Lutsk |
| 1 | Zaporizhia Oblast | ZAlK Zaporizhia |
