= Oleksandr Tarasenko (footballer, born 1985) =

Ukrainian footballer

Personal information
- Full name: Oleksandr Serhiyovych Tarasenko
- Date of birth: 12 February 1985 (age 41)
- Place of birth: Yaresky, Poltava Oblast, Ukrainian SSR
- Height: 1.80 m (5 ft 11 in)
- Position: Attacking midfielder

Team information
- Current team: Myrhorod

Youth career
- 1999–2000: UFK Kharkiv
- 2000–2001: Sportive School #9 Kharkiv
- 2001–2002: UFK Kharkiv

Senior career*
Years	Team	Apps	(Gls)
2004–2012	Helios Kharkiv	244	(51)
2012–2013	Naftovyk-Ukrnafta Okhtyrka	23	(1)
2013–2014	Sumy	27	(4)
2015	Limanovia Limanowa	9	(0)
2015	Sandecja Nowy Sącz	10	(2)
2016–2017	Izolator Boguchwała		
2017	JKS 1909 Jarosław	7	(1)
2019–2021	Vovchansk	24	(3)
2021	Krystal Kherson		
2023–	Myrhorod		
- * Club domestic league appearances and goals as of 12 February 2024

Oleksandr Tarasenko (Ukrainian: Олександр Сергійович Тарасенко (born 12 February 1985 in Yaresky, Poltava Oblast) is a Ukrainian footballer who plays as an attacking midfielder for Myrhorod.

== Career ==
He started his professional career in 2003 for FC Helios Kharkiv in the Druha Liha. In his debut season he was the team leader in goals scored with 12. The following season he won promotion to the Ukrainian First League with Helios. In 2012, he signed with FC Naftovyk-Ukrnafta Okhtyrka, after one season with Okhtyrka he was transferred to PFC Sumy.

In 2015, he went across the border in order to sign with Limanovia Limanowa in the II Liga. Within the same season he played in the I liga with Sandecja Nowy Sącz. In 2016, he signed with Izolator Boguchwała in the IV liga. In August 2017, Tarasenko signed with Polish III liga club JKS 1909 Jarosław.
