= FC Rava Rava-Ruska =

- Full name: FC Rava Rava-Ruska
- Founded: 2001
- Dissolved: 2009
- Ground: Lokomotyv Stadium
- League: Amateurs (Lvivska Oblast)
- 2008: 1st, dissolved

Rava Rava-Ruska was an amateur football team based in Rava Ruska, Lviv Oblast in Ukraine near the border with Poland.

== History ==
Rava-Ruska performed well in the amateurs in 2002, winning the Memorial Ernest Yusta Cup in 2003 and entered the professional league in 2003/04 in the Druha Liha. They immediately proved their intent finishing 3rd. The next season they captured the Druha Liha A championships but were not promoted due to their facilities and financial standings being not at the level of acceptance by the PFL. The club played one more season in the professional leagues and then after the 2005/2006 season, the club's administration elected to leave the PFL.

In 2007 a new club Lokomotyv Rava-Ruska was created that competed in the regional competitions of Lviv Oblast and also performed in some national amateur competitions and reached the semi-finals of the Amateur Cup in 2007. After 2009 the club ceased to exist again. In 2011 Karpaty Lviv opened its sports academy partially reviving a football life in the border town. It was named the Children-Youth Sports School of Olympic Reserve of FC Karpaty Lviv.

== Honors ==
- Ukrainian Druha Liha: 1

2004/05 Champions Group A

== League and cup history ==
Season	Div.	Pos.	Pl.	W	D	L	GS	GA	P	Domestic Cup	Europe	Notes
2003–04	3rd "A"	3	30	17	5	8	47	25	56	1/32 finals		
2004–05	3rd "A"	1	28	21	4	3	49	16	67	1/32 finals		
2005–06	3rd "A"	3	28	18	4	6	37	13	58	1/16 finals		
2006–09	Amateur competitions											
