= FC Krasyliv =

- The club's logo reads two last name "Arsenyuk" and "Shtefanik"
- Founded: 2000
- Dissolved: 2007
- League: defunct
Home colours

FC Krasyliv was a Ukrainian football team that played in Krasyliv, Khmelnytskyi Oblast.

== History ==
In 2000 a local company of Petro Arsenyuk bought out a local team and a stadium. The same year the team won the Khmelnytskyi Oblast football competitions in the regional second tier.

The club entered the professional leagues in 2001 with help of former players Serhiy Kovalets and Ihor Khiblin (also a referee). The club was initially successful finishing in 3rd place in the Druha Liha Group "A". The same season they were crowned champions and were promoted to the Persha Liha for the 2002–03 season. On Saturday 9 August 2002 Krasyliv visited Khmelnytskyi as part of Round of 64 of the 2002–03 Ukrainian Cup. They beat the home team Podillia on penalties 5–4 after regulation time ended in a 1–1 tie. This regional derby match was principal in the way that the previous season Krasyliv left Podillia behind winning the Second League and gaining promotion to the First League.

The club, coming from a small provincial town was under financial duress and in 2003–04 they forged a union with Obolon and became their farm club under the name Krasyliv-Obolon.

Before the next season started FC Podillya Khmelnytskyi who finish 2nd in the Ukrainian Second League 2003-04 season merges with Krasyliv-Obolon and moves the team operations from Khmelnytskyi to Krasyliv prior to the start of season.

In 2006 on petition of the Mayor of Khmelnytskyi City, Mykola Prystupa, it was agreed that FC Podillia would play in Krasyliv, while FC Krasyliv will be based in Khmelnytskyi.

Following the 2006 mayoral elections of the Khmelnytskyi City and election of new mayor, a conflict arose between the head of club's council Oleksandr Arsenyuk and the newly elected mayor Serhiy Melnyk.

== Honors ==
- Ukrainian Druha Liha: 1

2001/02 Champions Group A

- Khmelnytskyi Oblast Persha Liha (2nd tier): 1

2000 Champions

== League and cup history ==
Season	Div.	Pos.	Pl.	W	D	L	GS	GA	P	Domestic Cup	Europe	Notes
FC Krasyliv
2000–01	3rd "A"	3	30	19	5	6	53	25	62	1/16 finals Second League Cup		
2001–02	3rd "A"	1	36	28	4	4	70	21	88	1st Round		Promoted
2002–03	2nd	8	34	14	7	13	42	37	49	1/8 finals		
Krasyliv-Obolon Krasyliv
2003–04	2nd	13	34	10	10	14	35	54	40	1/16 finals		
Podillia Khmelnytskyi
2004–05	2nd	13	34	12	7	15	45	54	43	1/16 finals		merger^{(a)}
2005–06	2nd	7	34	14	7	13	39	37	49	1/32 finals		
2006–07	2nd	18	36	5	6	25	20	63	9	1/32 finals		dissolved

== Notes ==
- ^[Note a]: FC Podillya Khmelnytskyi merged with FC Krasyliv-Obolon (13th Ukrainian First League 2003-04) and excluded from the professional competition being replaced by Krasyliv that was renamed into Podillia
