= FC Kryvbas-2 Kryvyi Rih =

Kryvbas-2 Kryvyi Rih
- Full name: Football Club Kryvbas-2 Kryvyi Rih
- Founded: 1993; 32 years ago
- Website: https://web.archive.org/web/20121226053502/http://www.fckryvbas.com.ua/

Football Club Kryvbas-2 Kryvyi Rih (Ukrainian: Футбольний Клуб Кривбас-2 Кривий Ріг) is a reserve team of recently reformed Kryvbas Kryvyi Rih. Before 2013 it competed as a reserve team of the original Kryvbas Kryvyi Rih.

In June 2013 Kryvbas Kryvyi Rih went bankrupt. In 2020 FC Hirnyk Kryvyi Rih switched its brand to Kryvbas and field its second team Kryvbas-2 in amateur competitions.

== History ==
In 1993 Kryvbas entered its second team in the Ukrainian amateur competitions, but after two seasons withdrew it.

In 1998 the club entered into the professional leagues to compete in the Second League without entering the team in amateur competitions.

After 3 seasons the club moved to regional level before competing one more season in Second League. After 2004 the team was reformed into Kryvbas doubles team competing at competitions for reserves until 2013.

In 2020 the team once again returned to amateur level after reform of FC Hirnyk Kryvyi Rih that changed its name to Kryvbas.

== League and cup history ==
=== Kryvbas-2 Kryvyi Rih (original) ===
Season	Div.	Pos.	Pl.	W	D	L	GS	GA	P	Domestic Cup	Europe	Notes
1993–94	4th	12	32	10	6	16	29	46	26			
1994–95	4th	16	32	3	2	27	12	29	11			withdrew
1998-99	3rd "B"	3	26	17	4	5	46	16	55	Did not enter		
1999-00	3rd "B"	3	26	16	3	7	55	28	51	1/16 finals Second League Cup		
2000-01	3rd "B"	15	28	6	3	19	28	20	21			Club withdrawn
2002-03	Club competes at regional level											
2003-04	3rd "B"	12	30	10	6	14	33	44	36			Club moves to Reserve competition

== See also ==
- FC Kryvbas Kryvyi Rih
- FC Hirnyk Kryvyi Rih
