= FC Sokil Zolochiv =

- Full name: FC Sokil Zolochiv
- Founded: 1976
- League: Amateurs (Lviv Oblast)

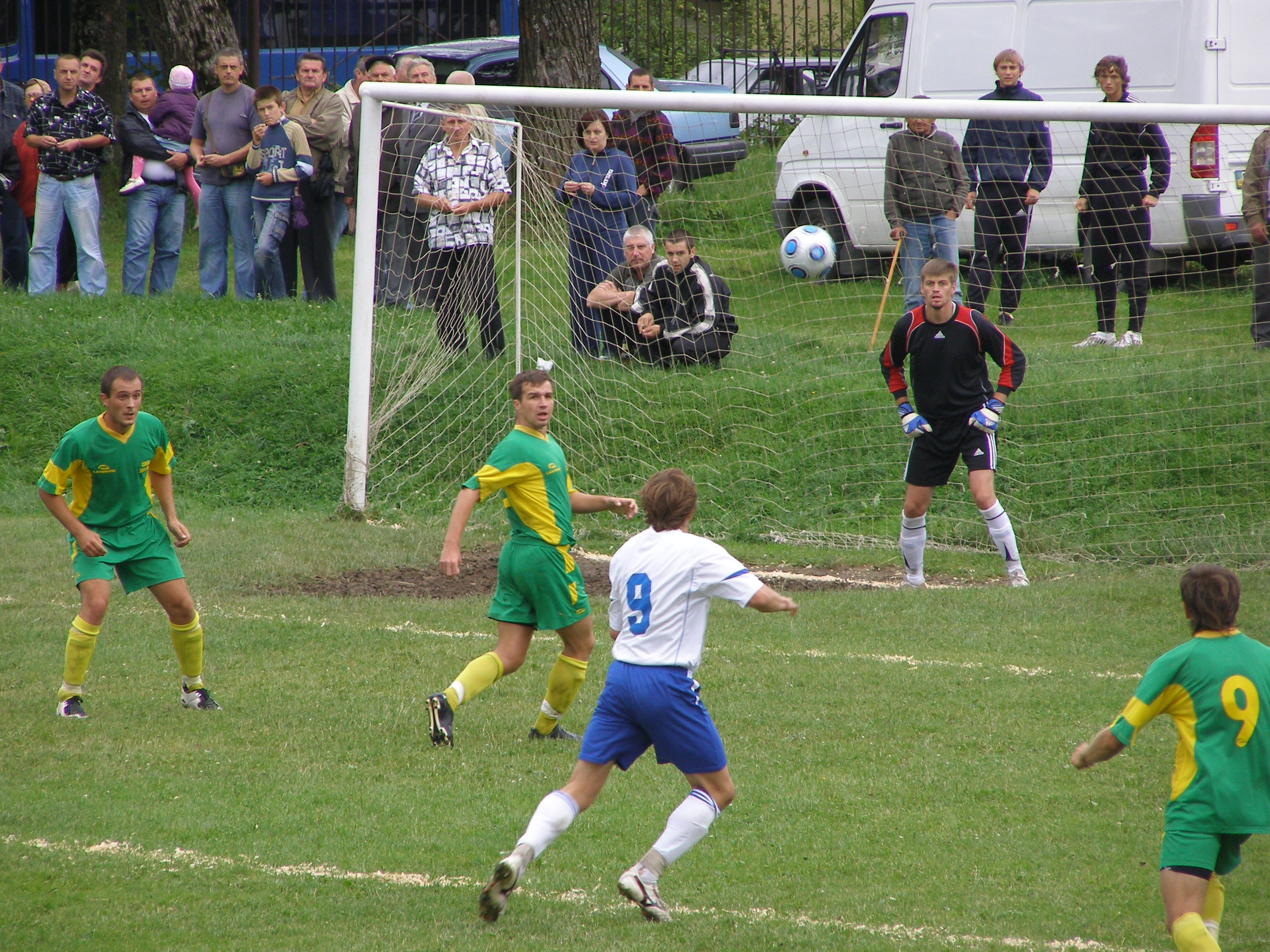
2009 Lviv Oblast Championship game Naftusia Skhidnytsia – Sokil Zolochiv (Zolochiv is in green)

FC Sokil Zolochiv is a Ukrainian football club from Zolochiv, Lviv Oblast that currently competes at the Amateur level. The club entered the Ukrainian Amateur Championships in 2008. Also they compete in the Lvivska Oblast competition.

== History ==
In their history the club also played in the professional leagues. After performing well in the amateur competitions Sokil Zolochiv entered the Ukrainian Second League in 2000. They finish 2nd in their initial season as well as in the 2001–2002 season and were promoted into the Ukrainian First League.

During the 2002–03 season they performed one of the biggest upsets in modern Ukrainian Football when they eliminated Ukrainian Premier League side FC Metalurh Zaporizhzhia in the 2002–03 Ukrainian Cup 1/16 finals. Later in the season the club removed themselves from the Persha Liha competition and returned to the regional Lviv Oblast competition.

== Honors ==
- Ukrainian Druha Liha
  - Runners-up (2): 2000–01 (Group A), 2001–02 (Group A)

== League and cup history ==
Season	Div.	Pos.	Pl.	W	D	L	GS	GA	P	Domestic Cup	Europe	Notes
2000–01	3rd "A"	2	30	20	8	2	48	6	68	1/8 finals		
2001–02	3rd "A"	2	36	26	5	5	80	26	83	3rd Round		promoted
2002–03	2nd	18	34	4	7	23	23	39	19	1/8 finals		Withdrawn
2003–2008	Club competes at the Amateur level (Lvivska Oblast)											
2008	4th	2	8	5	0	3	14	13	15			

== Head coaches ==
- 2000–01 Ihor Levytskyi
- 2001 Vyacheslav Mavrov
- 2001–02 Bohdan Suryak
- 2002 Andriy Chikh
- 2002 Bohdan Suryak
- 2003 Valentyn Khodukin
- 2008 Mykhailo Zavalnyuk
