= Ukrainian Second League =

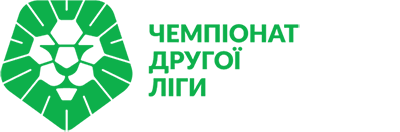
- Founded: 1992; 34 years ago (as Transitional League)
- Country: Ukraine
- Number of clubs: 22 (2 groups)
- Level on pyramid: 3
- Promotion to: Ukrainian First League
- Relegation to: None (2007–2016) (Note: Currently the Professional Football League of Ukraine does not relegate teams, as a lot of them withdraw from the league on their own due to financial difficulties. Normally the clubs placing last are subject to loss of professional status and relegation to their regional competitions.); Amateurs (1995–present); Ukrainian Third League (1992–1994)
- Domestic cup(s): Ukrainian Cup; Second League Cup (defunct)
- Current champions: Kulykiv-Bilka (2025–26)
- Most championships: 3 titles Desna Chernihiv
- Top scorer: Oleksandr Kozhemyachenko (105)
- Website: pfl.ua
- Current: 2026–27 Ukrainian Second League

The Ukrainian Second League (Ukrainian: Друга ліга, Druha Liha) is a professional football league in Ukraine which is part of the Professional Football League of Ukraine, a collective member of the Ukrainian Association of Football. As the third tier it was established in 1992 as the Transitional League and changed its name the next season.

The league is lower than the Ukrainian First League (Persha Liha) and the lowest level of professional football competitions in the country. Since 1996 the league, after being merged with its lower tier (in 1992–1995 there was the Third League), consists of two main regions roughly north-west and south-east. The league's relegated teams lose their professional status and return to their regional associations.

== Quick overview ==
=== First seasons ===
The third division of the Ukrainian championship originally was organized as the Transitional League due to numerous amateur clubs competing in it 15 out of 18. Out of the 1992 Transitional League the top clubs qualified for the 1992-93 Second League, while the bottom - the 1992-93 Transitional League, thus, creating an extra tier. Basically in the first seasons there was no promotion.

For the second season (1992-93) the league was officially organized as the Second League, while the name of transitional league was passed to the newly formed fourth division. Between seasons 1993 and 1995, there existed an auxiliary level (the Third League in 1994-95) of the football championship in Ukraine, lower than the Second League. From 1993 season to 1995 the Second League had a single group competition of over 20 clubs. During the 1996 reorganization, the auxiliary league was merged back to the Second League.

=== Creation of PFL ===
In 1996 Ukrainian football witnessed major changes in its organization as the Professional Football League of Ukraine was established. The new organization took control of the competition of former non-amateur clubs that were given attestation of professional clubs and included all the leagues of the Ukrainian championship. Concurrently with this the Third League was disbanded and all clubs that were not in the "relegation zone" were invited to join the Second League. The Second League in its turn was split into two groups. Only in the very first season the teams in this league were divided somewhat randomly, while later becoming more of regional sub-leagues. From 1997 the league was divided into three groups (Druha Liha A (west), B (south), and C (east)).

=== Further developments ===
In 1998 unlike other seasons the winners of the groups were not promoted automatically; instead a promotion-relegation tournament was organized involving four teams, three group winners and one of the weaker clubs of the First League. In 2006, the Ukrainian Professional Football League consolidated the Druha Liha due to a shortage of teams, and now the third level of professional football is divided into two groups once again (A - West and B - East).

Throughout its history the Second League has had some supplementary tournaments which include the Second League Cup as well as the Ukrainian Cup qualification tournament called the 2009–10 Ukrainian League Cup.

In summer of 2017 it was announced that the Second League is planned to be discontinued after the 2017-18 season.

=== Team withdrawals / critical situation ===
The league has suffered from chronic club withdrawals since its reorganization when the Ukrainian Third League was liquidated in 1995. The first club that withdrew in the middle of a season from Ukrainian championship was FC Elektron Romny which on 5 May 1994 withdrew from the Transitional League (Third League).

The reorganization of the competition in 1995 (merging Third and Second leagues) saw a number of clubs that discontinued their participation. At the start of season withdrew Temp Shepetivka which prior to that merged with Advis as well as Kosmos Pavlohrad, and five more clubs withdrew at winter break. Withdrawal of Temp led to a major disruption in competitions when Football Federation of Ukraine allowed to enter a quickly assembled team of amateur players for the First League to replace withdrawn Shepetivka club.

For a couple of years after that, there was relative stabilization, but not perfect with at least one club being withdrawn in a middle of ongoing season. In the 1998-99 season 10 teams quit the league before the season started. During the 2002-03 season Ukrainian football saw the withdrawal of a Top League club for the first time (Polihraftekhnika Oleksandriya). Due to those withdrawals the Second League suspended relegation of clubs since 2006-07, while there were some talks for the league to be discontinued. An idea surfaced during the 2009-10 season to merge the league with the First League breaking the last into several groups, but it was abandoned. During the same season a new tournament was organized to add some games to the calendar of the Second League clubs which had thinned away substantially, this was called the 2009–10 Ukrainian League Cup.

== Current composition ==
The following teams are competing in the 2026–27 season. Two teams were spared from relegation from the previous season due to other teams' withdrawal. Note: in parentheses are shown the actual home cities and stadiums.

former Premier (Vyshcha) Liha clubs
recently relegated from First (Persha) Liha
recently promoted from AAFU

Team	Home city	Stadium	Capacity	Position in 2025–26	First season in 2L	Seasons in 2L
Atlet	Kyiv	Stadion DYuSSh Atlet	300	5th (Gr.A)	2025–26	1
Avanhard	Lozova, Kharkiv Oblast	Stadion DYuSSh, Yuriivka		AAFU	2026–27	debut
Bratslav	Vinnytsia	Sports Complex Nyva	3,282	AAFU	2026–27	debut
Carbon	Cherkasy	LNZ training field, Heronymivka		AAFU	2026–27	debut
Dinaz	Vyshhorod, Kyiv Oblast	Stadion Dinaz	550	9th (Gr.B)	2019–20	4
Dnister	Zalishchyky, Ternopil Oblast	Stadion Dnister	1,500	AAFU	2026–27	debut
Metalurh	Zaporizhia	Slavutych Arena	12,000	1L	2016–17	5
Nyva	Vinnytsia	Sports Complex Nyva	3,282	3rd (Gr.A)	2007–08	13
Oleksandriya-2	Oleksandriya, Kirovohrad Oblast	Stadion Olimp	2,640	7th (Gr.B)	2024–25	2
Penuel	Kryvyi Rih, Dnipropetrovsk Oblast	Stadion imeni Povoroznyuka, Volodymyrivka		10th (Gr.B)	2025–26	1
Podillya	Khmelnytskyi	SC Podillya	6,811	1L	1997–98	18
Poltava-2	Poltava			youth	2026–27	debut
Rebel	Kyiv	Training complex imeni Bannikova	1,678	4th (Gr.B)	2025–26	1
Rukh	Lviv	Arena Lviv	34,915	PL	2016–17	1
Sambir-Nyva-2	Ternopil	Stadion imeni Brovarskoho, Sambir	1,918	4th (Gr.A)	2024–25	2
Skala 1911	Stryi, Lviv Oblast	Stadion Sokil	1,789	7th (Gr.A)	2001–02	6
Trostianets	Trostianets, Sumy Oblast	Stadion imeni Kutsa	1,129	6th (Gr.B)	2021–22	4
Vilkhivtsi	Vilkhivtsi, Zakarpattia Oblast	Vilkhivtsi Arena	1,500	8th (Gr.A)	2024–25	2

=== Location map and stadiums ===
Home venues of teams in the 2026–27 Ukrainian Second League
— Group A — Group B
Home venues of teams in the 2025–26 Ukrainian Second League in Kyiv and Kyiv Oblast

== Organization ==
The calendar of competitions is adopted by the Central Council of PFL and the Executive Committee of FFU. The Bureau (Administration) of PFL regulates the league's operations and forms the Second League. All clubs of the PFL are obligated to own or sponsor a Children-Youth Sports School. All clubs of PFL are obligated to participate in the National Cup competition. A club of the Second League is also obligated to finance at least two junior teams from under the age of 10 to under the age of 19. The junior teams must participate either in regional competitions of the Children-Youth Football League of Ukraine.

All stadiums must have a certificate of the State Commission in control of sports structures conditions. A club cannot play matches at its training sites nor stadiums not registered with PFL. Promotions of tobacco products at stadiums are prohibited. All stadiums must fly the flags of Ukraine, FFU, and PFL. Only accredited photo-correspondents and junior footballers who collect balls are allowed behind goalposts.

The games are allowed to start not earlier than 12:00 and not later than 20:30. There must be at least a 48-hour break between two official games. Games can only be rescheduled if the following three criteria exist: a) unforeseen circumstances occur, b) delegation of four or more footballers to any national teams, or c) organization of direct tele-broadcasting.

Throughout history certain regions were represented only in certain groups, some competed in all groups. Among regions that were represented only in Group A are Lviv Oblast, Ternopil Oblast, Ivano-Frankivsk Oblast, Rivne Oblast, Zhytomyr Oblast, Chernivtsi Oblast, Zakarpattia Oblast, Volyn Oblast, only in Group B is just Autonomous Republic of Crimea, Group C existed for short time and had no exclusive region representation.

Such regions like Kyiv Oblast and City, Cherkasy Oblast, Kirovohrad Oblast, Chernihiv Oblast, Sumy Oblast, and Kharkiv Oblast at some point were represented in all three groups.

Such regions like Donetsk Oblast, Luhansk Oblast, Dnipropetrovsk Oblast, Zaporizhzhia Oblast, and Poltava Oblast were represented only in groups B and C.

== Top three by season ==
Promoted teams are indicated in bold.

Season	Group	Teams	Winner	Runner-up	Third place
1992	**A**	9	Dnister Zalishchyky	Hazovyk Komarno	Yavir Krasnopillia
1992	**B**	9	Bazhanovets Makiyivka	Tytan Armyansk	Meliorator Kakhovka
1992–93	–	18	**Dnipro Cherkasy**	**Khimik Zhytomyr**	Yavir Krasnopillia
1993–94 (Note: In 1993–94 four teams were promoted to the Ukrainian First League. The fourth place team in the competition was Naftokhimik Kremenchuk.)	–	22	**FC Boryspil**	**Bazhanovets Makiyivka**	**Zirka-NIBAS Kirovohrad**
1994–95	–	22	**Yavir Krasnopillia**	**FC Lviv**	Dynamo Luhansk
1995–96	**A**	22	**CSKA Kyiv**	Krystal Kherson	Khutrovyk Tysmenytsia
1995–96	**B**	21	**Metalurh Mariupol**	**Metalurh Donetsk**	Metalurh Novomoskovsk
1996–97	**A**	16	**Desna Chernihiv**	Fakel Varva	FK Tysmenytsia
1996–97	**B**	17	**Avanhard-Industriya Rovenky**	Tytan Armyansk	Oskil Kupiansk
1997–98	**A**	18	**Podillia Khmelnytskyj**	Dynamo-3 Kyiv	Karpaty-2 Lviv
1997–98	**B**	17	Krystal Kherson (Note: Krystal Kherson failed to win the play-offs for promotion to the Ukrainian First League.)	SCA-Lotto Odesa	SC Odesa
1997–98	**C**	17	**Shakhtar-2 Donetsk**	Fakel Varva	Elektron Romny
1998–99	**A**	15	**Zakarpattia Uzhhorod**	Borysfen Boryspil	Tsymentnyk-Khorda Mykolaiv
1998–99	**B**	16	**SC Odesa** (Note: In 1999 SC Odesa was merged with FC Chornomorets Odesa and its place in Ukrainian First League was fielded revived FC Chornomorets-2 Odesa.)	Krystal Kherson	Kryvbas-2 Kryvyi Rih
1998–99	**C**	14	**Obolon-PPO Kyiv**	Zorya Luhansk	Oskil Kupiansk
1999–00	**A**	16	**Bukovyna Chernivtsi**	Podillia Khmelnytskyj	Enerhetyk Burshtyn
1999–00	**B**	14	**Borysfen Boryspil**	Obolon-PPO-2 Kyiv	Kryvbas-2 Kryvyj Rih
1999–00	**C**	14	**Dnipro-2 Dnipropetrovsk**	ADOMS Kremenchuk	Zorya Luhansk
2000–01	**A**	16	**Polissia Zhytomyr**	Sokil Zolochiv	FC Krasyliv
2000–01	**B**	15	**Obolon Kyiv**	Systema-Boreks Borodianka	Dnipro-3 Dnipropetrovsk
2000–01	**C**	16	**FC Naftovyk Okhtyrka**	Desna Chernihiv	Oskil Kupiansk
2001–02	**A**	19	**FC Krasyliv**	**Sokil Zolochiv**	Podillia Khmelnytskyj
2001–02	**B**	18	**Systema-Boreks Borodianka**	Nafkom-Akademiya Irpin	Dynamo Simferopol
2001–02	**C**	18	**FC Sumy**	**Arsenal Kharkiv**	Metalurh-2 Donetsk
2002–03	**A**	15	LUKOR Kalush (Note: LUKOR Kalush officially was not farm team of Prykarpattia Ivano-Frankivsk. After the season it was announced that both clubs "merged" with LUKOR Kalush being officially promoted as Spartak Ivano-Frankivsk and Prykarpattia Ivano-Frankivsk being officially relegated as Prykarpattia Kalush. In reality no real changes took place except for change of names. Rosters, coaching staff, clubs' structure were preserved with the Kalush team continued to be played in the Second League.)	Enerhetyk Burshtyn	Podillia Khmelnytskyj
2002–03	**B**	16	**Nafkom Irpin**	Dynamo Simferopol	Elektrometalurh-NZF Nikopol
2002–03	**C**	15	**Zorya Luhansk**	Shakhtar Luhansk	Desna Chernihiv
2003–04	**A**	16	**Hazovyk-Skala Stryj**	Podillia Khmelnytskyj	Rava Rava-Ruska
2003–04	**B**	16	**Dynamo-IhroServis Simferopol**	Elektrometalurh-NZF Nikopol	Krymteplytsia Molodizhne
2003–04	**C**	16	**Stal Dniprodzerzhynsk**	Desna Chernihiv	Metalurh-2 Zaporizhzhia
2004–05	**A**	15	Rava Rava-Ruska (Note: After reviewing Rava Ruska's solvency and facilities the PFL decided not to promote them. 2nd placed Enerhetyk Burshtyn were promoted instead.)	**Enerhetyk Burshtyn**	Karpaty-2 Lviv
2004–05	**B**	14	**Krymteplytsia Molodizhne**	Krystal Kherson	FC Oleksandriya
2004–05	**C**	15	**Helios Kharkiv**	Desna Chernihiv	Dnipro Cherkasy
2005–06	**A**	16	**Desna Chernihiv**	Fakel Ivano-Frankivsk	Rava Rava-Ruska
2005–06	**B**	15	**MFK Mykolaiv**	**PFC Oleksandria** (Note: PFC Oleksandria were promoted to the Ukrainian First League since they were best 2nd placed team in all Druha Liha competitions)	PFC Sevastopol
2005–06	**C**	13	**Dnipro Cherkasy**	Illichivets-2 Mariupol	Metalurh-2 Zaporizhzhia
2006–07	**A**	15	**Dnister Ovidiopol**	**Fakel Ivano-Frankivsk**	Yednist Plysky
2006–07	**B**	16	**PFC Sevastopol**	**Feniks-Illichivets Kalinine**	Tytan Armyansk
2007–08	**A**	16	**Knyazha Schaslyve**	Nyva Ternopil	Podillia-Khmelnytskyj
2007–08	**B**	18	**Komunalnyk Luhansk**	Tytan Armyansk	Arsenal Kharkiv
2008–09	**A**	17	**Nyva Ternopil**	**Arsenal Bila Tserkva** (Note: FC Arsenal Bila Tserkva were promoted to the Ukrainian First League since FC Ihroservice Simferopol as the member of the First League withdrew from competitions. Arsenal and Poltava were allowed to compete for the extra promotion due to that in the play-off game in Cherkasy. Arsenal won the game 1–0, gaining promotion.)	Nyva Vinnytsia
2008–09	**B**	18	**Zirka Kirovohrad**	FC Poltava	Stal Dniprodzerzhynsk
2009–10	**A**	11	**Bukovyna Chernivtsi**	**Nyva Vinnytsia**	Bastion Illichivsk
2009–10	**B**	14	**Tytan Armyansk**	Kremin Kremenchuk	FC Poltava
2010–11	**A**	12	**MFC Mykolaiv**	FC Sumy	Enerhiya Nova Kakhovka
2010–11	**B**	12	**Olimpik Donetsk**	FC Poltava	Kremin Kremenchuk
2011–12	**A**	14	**FC Sumy**	Desna Chernihiv	Slavutych Cherkasy
2011–12	**B**	14	**FC Poltava**	**Avanhard Kramatorsk**	Shakhtar Sverdlovsk
2012–13 (2 stages)	**A**	11	**Desna Chernihiv**	**Nyva Ternopil**	Slavutych Cherkasy
2012–13 (2 stages)	**B**	13	**UkrAhroKom Holovkivka**	Shakhtar Sverdlovsk	Shakhtar-3 Donetsk
2013–14 (Note: In the 2013–14 season, four teams were promoted to the Ukrainian First League. The fourth place team in the competition was Hirnyk Kryvyi Rih.)	–	19	**Hirnyk-Sport Komsomolsk**	**Stal Dniprodzerzhynsk**	**FC Ternopil**
2014–15	–	10	**Cherkaskyj Dnipro**	**Obolon-Brovar Kyiv**	Kremin Kremenchuk
2015–16 (Note: In the 2015–16 season, a record of six teams were promoted to the Ukrainian First League including Bukovyna Chernivtsi, Skala Stryi, and Arsenal-Kyiv.)	–	14	**Kolos Kovalivka**	**Veres Rivne**	**Inhulets Petrove**
2016–17 (Note: In the 2016–17 season, four teams were promoted to the Ukrainian First League, the fourth team being Balkany Zorya.)	–	17	**Zhemchuzhyna Odesa**	**Rukh Vynnyky**	**Kremin Kremenchuk**
2017–18 (Note: In the 2017–18 season, four teams were promoted to the Ukrainian First League and one team to the Ukrainian Premier League. This other team was FC Lviv (placed 5th, Group A).)	**A**	11	**Ahrobiznes Volochysk**	**Prykarpattia Ivano-Frankivsk**	Nyva-V Vinnytsia
2017–18	**B**	12	**SC Dnipro-1**	**Metalist 1925 Kharkiv**	Enerhiya Nova Kakhovka
2018–19	**A**	10	**FC Mynai**	**Cherkashchyna-Akademiya**	Polissia Zhytomyr
2018–19	**B**	10	**Kremin Kremenchuk**	**Metalurh Zaporizhzhia**	Hirnyk Kryvyj Rih
2019–20	**A**	11	**Nyva Ternopil**	**Polissya Zhytomyr**	**Veres Rivne**
2019–20	**B**	11	**VPK-Ahro Shevchenkivka**	**Krystal Kherson**	**Alians Lypova Dolyna**
2020–21	**A**	14	**Podillia Khmelnytskyi**	**FC Uzhhorod**	Dinaz Vyshhorod
2020–21	**B**	13	**Metal Kharkiv**	**Kryvbas Kryvyi Rih**	Metalurh Zaporizhzhia
**2021–22** (Note: In the 2021–22 season, ten teams were promoted to the Ukrainian First League, while Livyi Bereh was awarded promotion after skipping a season by honoring its second place.)	**A**	15	**Karpaty Lviv**	Livyi Bereh Kyiv	**LNZ Cherkasy**
**2021–22**	**B**	16	**Metalurh Zaporizhzhia**	**Skoruk Tomakivka**	Peremoha Dnipro
2022–23	–	10	**Nyva Buzova**	**FC Khust**	Chaika Petropavlivska Borshchahivka
2023–24 (Note: In the 2023–24 season, two teams were promoted to the Ukrainian First League, the second team being FC Kudrivka (placed 7th).)	–	15	Druzhba Myrivka	**UCSA Tarasivka**	PFC Zviahel
2024–25	**A**	10	**Probiy Horodenka**	Rukh-2 Lviv	Skala 1911 Stryi
2024–25	**B**	10	Kolos-2 Kovalivka	**FC Chernihiv**	Lokomotyv Kyiv
2025–26	**A**	11	**Kulykiv-Bilka**	**Polissya-2 Zhytomyr**	Nyva Vinnytsia
2025–26	**B**	11	**Lokomotyv Kyiv**	**Kolos-2 Kovalivka**	Chaika Petropavlivska Borshchahivka

Notes:

- indicates a championship title won in play-off game(s) between winners of groups.

== Post-season play-offs ==
Until 2009, post-season play-offs were not a common feature of the Second League competition. Over the years, there have been several instances when clubs contested promotion or relegation berths. The first post-season feature consisted of a promotion mini-tournament that took place in July 1998 in Kyiv and Boryspil. It involved three group winners of the Second League and Bukovyna, which placed 18th in the First League. The tournament identified clubs that would qualify for the 1998–99 Ukrainian First League.

=== Championship game ===
Season	Group A team	Score	Group B team	Place
2011–12	FC Sumy	2–0	FC Poltava	in Poltava
2012–13	FC Desna Chernihiv	2–0, 1–3 (a)	FC UkrAhroKom Holovkivka	home / away
2013–17	Single group competitions			–
2017–18	FC Ahrobiznes Volochysk	1–0	SC Dnipro-1	in Kyiv
2018–19	FC Mynai	0–1	FC Kremin Kremenchuk	in Kropyvnytskyi
2019–20	PFC Nyva Ternopil	Cancelled	FC VPK-Ahro Shevchenkivka	–
2020–21	FC Podillya Khmelnytskyi	0–1	FC Metal Kharkiv	in Cherkasy
2021–22	FC Karpaty Lviv	Cancelled	FC Metalurh Zaporizhzhia	–
2022–24	Single group competitions			–
2024–25	Probiy Horodenka	2–3, 1–0 (p)	Kolos-2 Kovalivka	home / away
2025–26	Kulykiv-Bilka	2–1	Lokomotyv Kyiv	in Khmelnytskyi

=== Third-place play-offs ===
Season	Group A team	Score	Group B team	Place
1995–96	Krystal Kherson	1–3	Metalurh Donetsk	in Kyiv
2008–09	Arsenal Bila Tserkva	1–0	FC Poltava	in Cherkasy
2009–10	Nyva Vinnytsia	2–0	Kremin Kremenchuk	in Makariv
2010–11	FC Sumy	2–0	FC Poltava	in Uman
2011–12	Desna Chernihiv	0–1	Avanhard Kramatorsk	in Khmelnytskyi
2024–25	three team mini-tournament (Chernihiv [B2], Skala 1911 [A3], Lokomotyv [B3])			
2025–26	Polissya-2 Zhytomyr	0–1	Kolos-2 Kovalivka	in Cherkasy

=== Relegation play-offs ===
Season	Second League team	Score	Amateur League team	Place
1997–98	FC Tysmenytsia	3–1, 1–1	Promin Sambir	home/away
1997–98	Hirnyk Pavlohrad	1–2, –/+	Shakhtar Horlivka	home/away
1997–98	Zirka-2 Kirovohrad	w/o	Kharchovyk Popivka	home/away

== Extra competitions ==
Since 2009, the PFL has organized several tournaments for the league's members.

== Statistics ==
=== Participated teams by regions ===
In bold are teams that played at least 10 seasons. In brackets is the number of seasons.

Region	Teams
Crimea	More Feodosiya (1992 {1}), Portovyk [Okean, Metalurh] Kerch (1992, 1993/94, 1994/95, 1996/97 {4}), **Tytan Armyansk** (1992–2009/10 {19}), Chaika Sevastopol (1992/93–1995/96, 2001/02 {5}), Dynamo Saky (1994/95–1996/97 {3}), Chernomorets Sevastopol (1997/98–1999/00 {3}), Dynamo Simferopol (2001/02–2003/04 {3}), FC Sevastopol (2002/03–2006/07 {5}), Krymteplytsia Molodizhne (2003/04, 2004/05 {2}), Khimik Krasnoperekopsk (2005/06–2007/08 {3}), Yalos Yalta (2005/06 {1}), Feniks-Illichovets Kalinine (2006/07 {1}), Sevastopol-2 (2008/09, 2011/12, 2012/13 {3}), Zhemchuzhyna Yalta (2012/13 {1}), Tavriya Simferopol (2017/18–2021/22 {5})
Cherkasy Oblast	[Dnipro] Cherkasy (1992/93, 2001/02–2005/06, 2008/09, 2021/22 {7}), Lokomotyv Smila (1995/96–1998/99 {3}), Cherkasy-2 (2000/01 {1}), Cherkashchyna [Cherkaskyi Dnipro, Slavutych Cherkasy] (2011/12–2014/15, 2018/19, 2020/21 {6}), LNZ Cherkasy (2021/22 {1}), Carbon Cherkasy (2026/27 {1})
Chernihiv Oblast	**Desna Chernihiv** (1994/95–1996/97, 1999/00–2004/05, 2010/11–2012/13 {12}), Fakel Varva (1995/96, 1997/98 {2}), Avers Bakhmach (1997/98 {1}), Yednist Plysky (2005/06–2012/13 {8}), Desna-2 Chernihiv (2008/09 {1}), FC Chernihiv (2020/21, 2021/22, 2024/25 {3}), FC Kudrivka (2023/24 {1})
Chernivtsi Oblast	**Bukovyna Chernivtsi** (1999/00, 2001/02–2009/10, 2015/16, 2017/18–2021/22 {16}), Bukovyna-2 Chernivtsi (2025/26 {1})
Dnipropetrovsk Oblast	Kosmos [Shakhtar] Pavlohrad (1993/94–1995/96 {3}), Sirius Kryvyi Rih (1994/95 {1}), Metalurh Novomoskovsk (1995/96–1999/99 {4}), Prometei Dniprodzerzhynsk (1995/96 {1}), Sportinvest Kryvyi Rih (1995/96 {1}), Dnipro-2 Dnipropetrovsk (1997/98–1999/00, 2002/03, 2003/04, 2010/11, 2011/12 {7}), Hirnyk Pavlohrad (1997/98 {1}), Kryvbas-2 Kryvyi Rih (1998/99–2000/01, 2003/04, 2005/06 {5}), Dnipro-3 Dnipropetrovsk (2000/01, 2001/02 {2}), Stal Dniprodzerzhynsk (2001/02–2003/04, 2008/09–2013/14 {9}), Elektrometalurh Nikopol (2002/03–2004/05 {3}), **Hirnyk Kryvyi Rih** (2004/05–2013/14, 2018/19, 2019/20 {12}), Dnipro-75 Dnipropetrovsk (2008/09, 2009/10 {2}), FC Nikopol[-NPHU] (2015/16–2021/22 {7}), FC Dnipro (2017/18 {1}), SC Dnipro-1 (2017/18 {1}), VPK-Ahro Shevchenkivka (2019/20 {1}), Kryvbas Kryvyi Rih (2020/21 {1}), Peremoha Dnipro (2020/21, 2021/22 {2}), Skoruk Tomakivka (2021/22 {1}), Penuel Kryvyi Rih (2025/26, 2026/27 {2})
Donetsk Oblast	Antratsyt Kirovske (1992 {1}), Bazhanovets Makiivka (1992–1993/94 {3}), Hirnyk Khartsyzk (1992 {1}), Medita [Prometei] Shakhtarsk (1992, 1993/94, 1994/95 {3}), Metalurh [Azovets] Mariupol (1992/93–1995/96 {4}), Shakhtar-2 [Metalurh Kostiantynivka] (1992/93–1997/98 {6}), Dynamo Slovyansk (1995/96 {1}), Metalurh Donetsk (1995/96 {1}), Metalurh Komsomolske (1997/98 {1}), Metalurh-2 Donetsk (1997/98, 2001/02–2003/04 {4}), Pivdenstal Yenakieve (1997/98 {1}), Shakhtar Horlivka (1998/99, 1999/00 {2}), VPS Kramatorsk (1998/99 {1}), Mashynobudivnyk Druzhkivka (1999/00–2001/02 {3}), **Illichivets-2 [Metalurh-2] Mariupol** (2000/01–2011/12, 2016/17 {13}), **Shakhtar-3 Donetsk** (2000/01–2014/15 {15}), Vuhlyk Dymytrov (2002/03–2004/05 {3}), Olimpik Donetsk (2004/05–2010/11 {7}), Tytan Donetsk (2007/08, 2008/09 {2}), Avanhard Kramatorsk (2011/12 {1}), Makiivvuhillia [Makiivka] Nikopol (2011/12–2014/15 {4}), Avanhard-2 Kramatorsk (2019/20 {1}), Yarud Mariupol (2020/21, 2021/22 {2})
Ivano-Frankivsk Oblast	**[Spartak-2, LUKOR] Kalush** (1995/96–2004/05, 2018/19, 2019/20 {12}), [Khutrovyk] Tysmenytsia (1995/96–1997/98 {3}), Pokuttia Kolomyia (1996/97, 1997/98 {2}), **Naftovyk Dolyna** (1997/98–2007/08 {11}), Enerhetyk Burshtyn (1998/99–2004/05 {7}), Prykarpattia-2 Ivano-Frankivsk (1999/00, 2000/01 {2}), Tekhno-Tsentr Rohatyn (2000/01–2004/05 {5}), Chornohora Ivano-Frankivsk (2001/02–2005/06 {5}), Prykarpattia [Fakel] Ivano-Frankivsk (2004/05–2006/07, 2011/12 {4}), [Teplovyk-]Prykarpattia Ivano-Frankivsk (2016/17, 2017/18 {2}), Karpaty Halych (2020/21, 2021/22 {2}), Revera 1908 Ivano-Frankivsk (2024/25 {1}), Probiy Horodenka (2024/25 {1})
Kharkiv Oblast	Olimpik Kharkiv (1992 {1}), Oskil Kupyansk (1995/96–2001/02 {7}), Metalist-2 [Avanhard-Metalist] Kharkiv (1996/97–2004/05 {9}), Arsenal Kharkiv (1999/00–2001/02, 2005/06–2008/09 {7}), Helios Kharkiv (2003/04, 2004/05 {2}), Hazovyk Kharkiv (2003/04–2007/08 {5}), FC Kharkiv (2005/06 {1}), Lokomotyv Dvorichna (2006/07 {1}), Metalist 1925 Kharkiv (2017/18 {1}), Metal Kharkiv (2020/21 {1}), FC Vovchansk (2021/22 {1}), Metalist 1925-2 Kharkiv (2024/25 {1}), Avanhard Lozova (2026/27 {1})
Kherson Oblast	[Meliorator] Kakhovka (1992–1995/96 {5}), **Krystal Kherson** (1992/93–2005/06, 2011/12–2016/17, 2018/19, 2019/20, 2021/22 {23}), **Enerhiya Nova Kakhovka** (2010/11–2021/22 {12}), Myr Hornostaivka (2011/12–2013/14, 2015/16–2018/19 {7})
Khmelnytskyi Oblast	Temp-Advis-2 Shepetivka (1995/96 {1}), **Podillya [Dynamo] Khmelnytskyi** (1997/98, 1999/00–2003/04, 2007/08–2013/14, 2016/17–2020/21, 2026/27 {19}), FC Krasyliv (2000/01, 2001/02 {2}), Ahrobiznes Volochysk (2017/18 {1}), Epitsentr Dunaivtsi (2020/21, 2021/22 {2})
Kyiv City	CSKA [CSK ZSU] (1992/93, 1995/96, 2008/09, 2009/10 {4}), Obolon (1995/96–1998/99, 2000/01 {5}), **Dynamo-3** (1997/98–2007/08 {11}), **Obolon-2** (1999/00, 2001/02–2008/09, 2012/13 {10}), Arsenal-2 (2003/04 {1}), Obolon-Brovar (2013/14, 2014/15 {2}), Arsenal Kyiv (2015/16 {1}), Obolon-Brovar-2 (2019/20, 2020/21 {2}), Rubikon Kyiv (2020/21–2022/23 {3}), AFSC Kyiv (2021/22 {1}), Livyi Bereh Kyiv (2021/22 {1}), Lokomotyv Kyiv (2023/24–2025/26 {3}), Atlet Kyiv (2025/26, 2026/27 {2}), Rebel Kyiv (2025/26, 2026/27 {2}), Livyi Bereh-2 Kyiv (2025/26 {1})
Kyiv Oblast	Borysfen Boryspil (1993/94, 1997/98–1999/00 {4}), **Ros [Ryhonda] Bila Tservka** (1993/94–2010/11 {18}), Nyva Myronivka (1995/96 {1}), [Skhid, Nerafa] Slavutych (1995/96–1997/98 {3}), Osvita [Systema-Boreks] Borodyanka (1995/96–2001/02, 2004/05 {8}), Borysfen-2 Boryspil (2001/02–2003/04 {3}), Nafkom [Naftovyk Irpin] Brovary (2001/02, 2002/03, 2005/06–2008/09 {6}), Knyazha Shchaslyve (2005/06–2007/08 {3}), Inter Boyarka (2005/06, 2006/07 {2}), Arsenal Bila Tserkva (2007/08, 2008/09, 2013/14–2017/18 {7}), Knyazha-2 Shchaslyve (2008/09 {1}), Kolos Kovalivka (2015/16 {1}), Chaika Petropavlivska Borshchahivka (2018/19–2025/26 {8}), Dinaz Vyshhorod (2019/20–2021/22, 2025/26, 2026/27 {5}), Lyubomyr Stavyshche (2021/22 {1}), Nyva Buzova (2022/23 {1}), UCSA Tarasivka (2023/24 {1}), Druzhba Myrivka (2023/24 {1}), Kolos-2 Kovalivka (2024/25, 2025/26 {2}), Lisne (2025/26 {1})
Kirovohrad Oblast	Zirka Kirovohrad (1992–1993/94, 2004/05, 2005/06, 2008/09 {6}), Zirka-2 Kirovohrad (1997/98–1999/00 {3}), PFC Oleksandriya (2004/05, 2005/06 {2}), MFC Oleksandriya (2004/05, 2005/06 {2}), Olimpik Kirovohrad (2007/08 {1}), UkrAhroKom Pryiutivka (2011/12, 2012/13 {2}), Inhulets Petrove (2015/16 {1}), Inhulets-2 Petrove (2016/17, 2017/18 {2}), FC Oleksandriya-2 (2024/25–2026/27 {3})
Lviv Oblast	**Hazovyk Komarne** (1992–2000/01 {10}), Promin Volia Baranetska (1992 {1}), **Halychyna Drohobych** (1992/93–2002/03 {11}), FC Lviv (1994/95 {1}), Avanhard Zhydachiv (1995/96 {1}), Haray Zhovkva (1995/96–1998/99 {4}), Skify Lviv (1995/96 {1}), **Karpaty-2 Lviv** (1997/98–2000/01, 2004/05–2009/10, 2023/24 {11}), Tsementnyk[-Khorda] Mykolaiv (1997/98–2001/02 {5}), Dynamo Lviv (1999/00, 2000/01 {2}), Sokil Zolochiv (2000/01, 2001/02 {2}), [Hazovyk-]Skala 1911 Stryi (2001/02–2003/04, 2023/24–2026/27 {7}), Karpaty-Halychyna [Karpaty-3] Lviv (2001/02–2003/04 {3}), SKA-Orbita Lviv (2001/02 {1}), Rava Rava-Ruska (2003/04–2005/06 {3}), FC Lviv-2 (2009/10 {1}), Skala Morshyn/Stryi (2009/10–2015/16, 2017/18 {8}), Rukh Lviv (2016/17, 2026/27 {2}), FC Lviv (2017/18 {1}), Karpaty Lviv (2020/21 {1}), Karpaty Lviv (2021/22 {1}), Rukh-2 Lviv (2023/24, 2024/25 {2}), Sambir-Nyva-2 Ternopil (2024/25–2026/27 {3}), FC Kulykiv-Bilka (2024/25, 2025/26 {2})
Luhansk Oblast	Shakhtar [Vahonobudivnyk] Stakhanov (1992/93, 1993/94, 1995/96–1998/99 {6}), Dynamo Luhansk (1993/94, 1994/95 {2}), Avanhard Rovenky (1995/96, 1996/97, 1998/99–2003/04 {8}), Shakhtar Sverdlovsk (1995/96, 2007/08–2013/14 {8}), Zorya Luhansk (1998/99–2002/03 {5}), Stal-2 Alchevsk (2000/01–2002/03 {3}), Shakhtar Luhansk (2002/03 {1}), Molniya Severodonetsk (2004/05 {1}), Komunalnyk Luhansk (2007/08 {1})
Mykolaiv Oblast	Artania Ochakiv (1994/95 {1}), **Enerhiya [Olimpiya] Yuzhnoukrainsk** (1995/96–2007/08 {13}), Vodnyk Mykolaiv (2003/04 {1}), MFC Mykolaiv (2005/06, 2008/09–2010/11, 2021/22 {5}), Enerhiya Mykolaiv (2013/14 {1}), Sudnobudivnyk Mykolaiv (2016/17, 2017/18 {2}), MFC Mykolaiv-2 (2017/18–2020/21 {4}), Vast Mykolaiv (2022/23, 2023/24 {2})
Odesa Oblast	**Chornomorets-2 Odesa** (1992/93–1994/95, 2000/01–2003/04, 2010/11, 2011/12, 2019/20, 2025/26 {11}), Dnistrovets Bilhorod-Dnistrovskyi (1995/96 {1}), Dynamo Odesa (1995/96, 1997/98, 1998/99 {3}), Portovyk Illichivsk (1995/96–2001/02 {7}), SC Odesa (1997/98, 1998/99 {2}) SKA-Lotto Odesa (1997/98 {1}), Dnister Ovidiopol (2001/02–2006/07 {6}), Palmira Odesa (2003/04, 2004/05 {2}), Real Odesa (2004/05 {1}), Bastion Illichivsk (2008/09–2010/11 {3}), SKAD-Yalpuh Bilhorod (2011/12 {1}), **Real Pharma Odesa [Yuzhne, Ovidiopol]** (2011/12–2025/26 {15}), SKA Odesa (2012/13 {1}), Zhemchuzhyna Odesa (2016/17 {1}), Balkany Zorya (2016/17, 2020/21, 2021/22 {3})
Poltava Oblast	Naftokhimik Kremenchuk (1993/94 {1}), **Hirnyk-Sport Komsomolsk** (1995/96–2013/14, 2024/25, 2025/26 {21}), FC Myrhorod [FC Petrivtsi] (1996/97–1999/00 {4}), Vorskla-2 Poltava (1997/98–2004/05, 2024/25 {9}), Adoms Kremenchuk (1999/00, 2000/01 {2}), **Kremin Kremenchuk** (1999/00, 2005/06–2016/17, 2018/19 {14}), FC Poltava (2007/08–2011/12 {5}), FC Karlivka [Poltava-2] (2012/13, 2013/14 {2}), SC Poltava (2021/22 {1}), Kremin-2 Kremenchuk (2022/23, 2023/24 {2}), SC Poltava-2 (2026/27 {1})
Rivne Oblast	**Veres Rivne** (1997/98–2010/11, 2015/16, 2018/19, 2019/20 {17}), Ikva Mlyniv (2003/04 {1})
Sumy Oblast	Elektron Romny (1992, 1997/98–2003/04 {8}), **Yavir Krasnopillia** (1992–1994/95, 2002/03–2007/08 {10}), Ahrotekhservis Sumy (1995/96 {1}), Slovianets Konotop (1997/98 {1}), Frunzenets-Liha-99 Sumy (2000/01, 2001/02 {2}), Naftovyk Okhtyrka (2000/01 {1}), FC Sumy (2001/02 {1}), PFC Sumy (2008/09–2011/12 {4}), Barsa Sumy (2015/16 {1}), Alians Lypova Dolyna (2019/20 {1}), FC Sumy (2021/22 {1}), FC Trostianets (2021/22, 2023/24–2026/27 {5})
Ternopil Oblast	Dnister Zalishchyky (1992–1993/94, 2026/27 {4}), Lysonia Berezhany (1992 {1}), Krystal Chortkiv (1997/98, 1998/99 {2}), Ternopil[-Nyva-2] (2000/01, 2001/02, 2012/13, 2013/14, 2017/18 {5}), **Nyva Ternopil** (2002/03–2008/09, 2010/11–2012/13, 2017/18–2019/20 {13})
Vinnytsia Oblast	[Nyva] Bershad (1996/97–1998/99, 2004/05 {4}), Fortuna Sharhorod (1997/98, 1998/99 {2}), Nyva Vinnytsia (res) (1999/00 {1}), **Nyva[-Svitanok] Vinnytsia** (2007/08–2009/10, 2016/17–2026/27 {14}), Bratslav Vinnytsia (2026/27 {1})
Volyn Oblast	Kovel-Volyn-2 (2001/02, 2002/03 {2}), Volyn-2 Lutsk (2020/21 {1})
Zakarpattia Oblast	Andezyt Khust (1992 {1}), Karpaty Mukachevo (1995/96–1997/98 {3}), Berkut Bedevlia (1997/98 {1}), Zakarpattia Uzhhorod (1998/99 {1}), Zakarpattia-2 Uzhhorod (2001/02 {1}), FC Mynai (2018/19 {1}), FC Uzhhorod (2019/20, 2020/21, 2024/25, 2025/26 {4}), Munkacs Mukachevo (2021/22 {1}), FC Khust (2022/23 {1}), SC Vilkhivtsi (2024/25–2026/27 {3})
Zaporizhzhia Oblast	Druzhba Berdiansk (1992–1995/96 {5}), Viktor Zaporizhia (1994/95–1999/00 {6}), **Olkom [Torpedo] Melitopol** (1995/96–2010/11 {15}), **Metalurh-2 Zaporizhia** (1998/99–2011/12 {14}), SDYuShOR Metalurh Zaporizhia (2000/01 {1}), Torpedo Zaporizhia (2001/02, 2002/03 {2}), Metalurh Zaporizhia (2016/17, 2017/18 {2}), Metalurh Zaporizhia (2018/19, 2020/21, 2021/22, 2026/27 {4}), Metalurh-2 Zaporizhia (2022/23, 2023/24 {2})
Zhytomyr Oblast	Polissya [Khimik] Zhytomyr (1992/93, 2000/01, 2017/18–2019/20 {5}), Keramik Baranivka (1995/96, 1996/97 {2}), Papirnyk Malyn (1996/97–1999/00 {4}), Systema-KKhP Chernyakhiv (2002/03 {1}), Zhytychi Zhytomyr (2005/06 {1}), MFC Zhytomyr (2005/06 {1}), FC Korosten (2007/08, 2008/09 {2}), FC Zviahel (2022/23, 2023/24 {2}), Polissya-2 Zhytomyr (2024/25, 2025/26 {2})

=== All group winners in the League by region ===
In bold are shown still active professional clubs

Region	CoA	Wins	Winners
Kyiv Oblast		9	Borysfen Boryspil (twice), Systema-Boreks Borodyanka, Nafkom Irpin, Knyazha Schaslyve, **Kolos Kovalivka**, Nyva Buzova, Druzhba Myrivka, **Kolos-2 Kovalivka**
Donetsk Oblast		4	Bazhanovets Makiivka, Metalurh Mariupol, Shakhtar-2 Donetsk, Olimpik Donetsk
Sumy Oblast		4	FC Sumy (Spartak) (twice), Naftovyk Okhtyrka, FC Sumy
Dnipropetrovsk Oblast		4	Dnipro-2 Dnipropetrovsk, Stal Dniprodzerzhynsk, SC Dnipro-1, VPK-Ahro Shevchenkivka
Khmelnytskyi Oblast		4	**Podillya Khmelnytskyi** (twice), FC Krasyliv, **Ahrobiznes Volochysk**
Kyiv		4	Obolon (twice), CSKA, **Lokomotyv**
Chernihiv Oblast		3	Desna Chernihiv (thrice)
Cherkasy Oblast		3	Dnipro Cherkasy (twice), Cherkaskyi Dnipro
Luhansk Oblast		3	**Zorya Luhansk**, Avanhard-Industria Rovenky, Komunalnyk Luhansk
Crimea		3	Tytan Armyansk, Dynamo-Ihroservice Simferopol, Krymteplytsia Molodizhne
Odesa Oblast		3	SC Odesa, Zhemchuzhyna Odesa, Dnister Ovidiopol
Poltava Oblast		3	FC Poltava, **Hirnyk-Sport Komsomolsk**, Kremin Kremenchuk
Ternopil Oblast		3	**Nyva Ternopil** (twice), Dnister Zalishchyky
Lviv Oblast		3	Hazovyk-Skala Stryi, Rava Rava-Ruska, **Kulykiv-Bilka** (**Karpaty Lviv**)
Chernivtsi Oblast		2	**Bukovyna Chernivtsi** (twice)
Mykolaiv Oblast		2	MFC Mykolaiv (twice)
Kirovohrad Oblast		2	Zirka Kirovohrad, UkrAhroKom Holovkivka
Zakarpattia Oblast		2	Zakarpattia Uzhhorod, FC Mynai
Kharkiv Oblast		2	Helios Kharkiv, **Metal Kharkiv**
Ivano-Frankivsk Oblast		2	LUKOR Kalush, **Probiy Horodenka**
Kherson Oblast		1	Krystal Kherson
Zhytomyr Oblast		1	**Polissya Zhytomyr**
Sevastopol		1	PFC Sevastopol
Zaporizhzhia Oblast		0	(**Metalurh Zaporizhzhia**)

=== All-time table ===
Top-20. All figures are correct through the 2022–23 season. Club status is current of the 2024–25 season:

2024–25 Ukrainian Premier League
2024–25 Ukrainian First League
**2024–25 Ukrainian Second League**
2024–25 Ukrainian Football Amateur League
2024–25 Regional competitions
Club is defunct

PL	Team	Seasons	GP	W	D	L	GS	GA	Pts	Achievement	Prom	First	Last
1	Krystal Kherson	22	691	288	125	278	909	800	989	Winner	1	1992–93	2021–22
2	Tytan Armyansk	19	586	262	138	186	818	637	924	Winner	1	1992	2009–10
3	Desna Chernihiv	13	397	243	68	86	670	347	797	Winner	3	1994–95	2012–13
4	Kremin Kremenchuk	14	404	193	91	120	592	438	670	Winner	2	1999–00	2018–19
5	Shakhtar-3 Donetsk	15	440	194	71	175	683	622	653	Winner	–	2000–01	2014–15
6	**Hirnyk-Sport Komsomolsk**	19	566	182	105	279	613	826	651	Winner	1	1995–96	2013–14
7	Bukovyna Chernivtsi	14	431	179	97	155	508	488	634	Winner	4	1999–00	2021–22
8	Ros Bila Tserkva	18	546	174	102	270	504	784	624	5th	–	1993–94	2010–11
9	Olkom Melitopol	16	474	169	116	189	536	571	623	4th	–	1995–96	2010–11
10	Veres Rivne	16	477	159	96	222	474	653	573	Runner-up	1	1997–98	2019–20
11	Nyva Ternopil	12	355	156	86	113	420	377	554	Winner	3	2002–03	2019–20
12	Podillya Khmelnytskyi	10	317	167	50	100	482	327	551	Winner	2	1997–98	2020–21
13	Stal Dniprodzerzhynsk	9	268	149	52	67	427	246	499	Winner	2	2001–02	2013–14
14	Halychyna Drohobych	11	374	137	80	157	403	435	491	5th	–	1992–93	2002–03
15	FC Kalush	12	361	136	64	161	414	428	472	Winner	–	1995–96	2019–20
16	Metalurh-2 Zaporizhzhia	15	440	130	80	230	489	706	470	3rd	–	1998–99	2023–24
17	Illichivets-2 Mariupol	13	375	135	59	181	451	561	464	Runner-up	–	2000–01	2016–17
18	Hazovyk Komarno	10	326	130	74	122	380	354	464	Runner-up	–	1992	2000–01
19	Dynamo-3 Kyiv	11	328	125	89	114	364	311	464	Runner-up	–	1997–98	2007–08
20	Enerhiya Yuzhnoukrainsk	13	390	117	90	183	351	516	441	5th	–	1995–96	2007–08

== Players ==
Among notable players of the league are its top scorers.

All-time Second League appearance leaders
**Player**	**Games**	**Years**
(Ukraine) Oleksandr Kapusta	336	1996–2009
(Ukraine) Andriy Nikiforov	309	1992–2003
(Ukraine) Oleksandr Petrov	306	1992–2002
(Ukraine) Roman Sanzhar	299	1995–2011
(Ukraine) Yuriy Ponomarenko	296	1997–2009
(Ukraine) Oleksiy Bondar	296	1997–2009
(Ukraine) Yuriy Komyahin	296	2002–2016
(Ukraine) Oleksandr Krasnyanskyi	296	1994–2010
(Ukraine) Oleksandr Osmachko	295	1995–2016
(Ukraine) Mykola Dudych	294	1993–2003
Players **in bold** are still playing in Second League; Data as of 9 February 2021

All-time Second League scorers
**Player**	**Goals**	**Games**	**Years**
(Ukraine) Oleksandr Kozhemyachenko	105	219	1999–2011
(Ukraine) Oleksandr Kapusta	104	336	1996–2009
(Ukraine) Ihor Bezdolnyi	102	272	1994–2011
(Ukraine) Yevhen Arbuzov	98	255	1999–2009
(Ukraine) Vasyl Karpyn	88	244	1992–2003
(Ukraine) Stanislav Kulish	80	132	2008–2014
(Ukraine) Vasyl Shved	78	205	1993–2005
(Ukraine) Vladyslav Korobkin	73	215	2000–2013
(Ukraine) Ihor Kiriyenko	71	189	2002–2014
(Ukraine) Kostiantyn Pinchuk	68	142	1993–2007
(Ukraine) Volodymyr Kryzhanivskyi	66	192	1995–2006
Players **in bold** are still playing in Second League; Data accurate as of 19 January 2021

== Managers ==
Winning managers
Season	Nationality	Winning manager	Club	Ref
1992	UKR	Petro Chervin	Dnister Zalishchyky	
1992	UKR	Viktor Pyshchev	Bazhanovets Makiivka	
1992–93	UKR	Semen Osynovskyi	Dnipro Cherkasy	
1993–94	UKR	Volodymyr Bezsonov	FC Boryspil	
1994–95	UKR	Volodymyr Bohach	Yavir Krasnopillia	
1995–96	UKR	Volodymyr Lozynskyi	CSKA Kyiv	
1995–96	UKR	Yuriy Pohrebnyak	Metalurh Mariupol	
1996–97	UKR	Yukhym Shkolnykov	Desna Chernihiv	
1996–97	UKR	Oleh Smolyaninov	Avanhard Rovenky	
1997–98	UKR	Yuriy Avanesov	Podillia Khmelnytskyi	
1997–98	UKR	Serhiy Shevchenko	Krystal Kherson	
1997–98	UKR	Yevhen Korol	Shakhtar-2 Donetsk	
1998–99	UKR	Viktor Ryashko	Zakarpattia Uzhhorod	
1998–99	UKR	Ihor Nakonechnyi	SC Odesa	
1998–99	UKR	Vadym Lazorenko	Obolon-PVO Kyiv	
1999–2000	UKR	Yuriy Hiy	Bukovyna Chernivtsi	
1999–2000	UKR	Petro Kutuzov	Dnipro-2 Dnipropetrovsk	
2000–01	UKR	Yukhym Shkolnykov	Polissia Zhytomyr	
2000–01	UKR	Vasyl Yermak	Naftovyk Okhtyrka	
2001–02	UKR	Bohdan Blavatskyi	FC Krasyliv	
2001–02	UKR	Volodymyr Parkhomenko	FC Sumy	
2002–03	UKR	Mykola Prystay	Lukor Kalush	
2002–03	UKR	Volodymyr Kobzarev	Zorya Luhansk	
2003–04	UKR	Bohdan Bandura	Hazovyk-Skala Stryi	
2003–04	UKR	Oleksandr Sevidov	Stal Dniprodzerzhynsk	
2004–05	UKR	Ivan Kovanda	Rava Rava-Ruska	
2004–05	UKR	Ihor Nadein	Helios Kharkiv	
2005–06	UKR	Oleksandr Tomakh	Desna Chernihiv	
2005–06	UKR	Serhiy Morozov	Dnipro Cherkasy	
2006–07	UKR	Vasyl Ushchapovskyi	Dnister Ovidiopol	
2006–07	UKR	Serhiy Puchkov	PFC Sevastopol	

Winning managers (cont.)
Season	Nationality	Winning manager	Club	Ref
2007–08	TJK	Vitaly Levchenko	Knyazha Shchaslyve	
2007–08	UKR	Yuriy Malyhin	Komunalnyk Luhansk	
2008–09	UKR	Viktor Ryashko	Nyva Ternopil	
2008–09	UKR	Ihor Zhabchenko	Zirka Kirovohrad	
2009–10	UKR	Vadym Zayats	Bukovyna Chernivtsi	
2009–10	UKR	Mykola Fedorenko	Tytan Armyansk	
2010–11	UKR	Ruslan Zabranskyi	MFC Mykolaiv	
2010–11	UKR	Ihor Petrov	Olimpik Donetsk	
2011–12	UKR	Ihor Zakharyak	PFC Sumy	
2011–12	UKR	Anatoliy Bezsmertnyi	FC Poltava	
2012–13	UKR	Oleksandr Ryabokon	Desna Chernihiv	
2012–13	UKR	Yuriy Hura	UkrAhroKom Holovkivka	
2013–14	UKR	Ihor Zhabchenko	Hirnyk-Sport Komsomolsk	
2014–15	UKR	Ihor Stolovytskyi	Cherkaskyi Dnipro	
2015–16	UKR	Ruslan Kostyshyn	Kolos Kovalivka	
2016–17	UKR	Denys Kolchin	Zhemchuzhyna Odesa	
2017–18	UKR	Andriy Donets	Ahrobiznes Volochysk	
2017–18	UKR	Dmytro Mykhailenko	SC Dnipro-1	
2018–19	UKR	Vasyl Kobin	FC Mynai	
2018–19	UKR	Ihor Stolovytskyi	Kremin Kremenchuk	
2019–20	UKR	Vasyl Malyk	Nyva Ternopil	
2019–20	UKR	Serhiy Solovyov	VPK-Ahro Shevchenkivka	
2020–21	UKR	Vitaliy Kostyshyn	Podillia Khmelnytskyi	
2020–21	UKR	Oleksandr Kucher	Metal Kharkiv	
2021–22	UKR	Andriy Tlumak	Karpaty Lviv	
2021–22	UKR	Volodymyr Mykytyn	Metalurh Zaporizhzhia	
2022–23	UKR	Serhiy Karpenko	Nyva Buzova	
2023–24	UKR	Dmytro Chyrykal	Druzhba Myrivka	
2024–25	UKR	Volodymyr Kovalyuk	Probiy Horodenka	
2024–25	UKR	Volodymyr Bondarenko	Kolos-2 Kovalivka	
2025–26	UKR	Serhiy Atlasyuk	Kulykiv-Bilka	
2025–26	UKR	Serhiy Karpenko	Lokomotyv Kyiv	

== Stadiums ==
=== Most attended games ===
Most of the most attended games in the league since 1992 recorded at Zirka Stadium (Kropyvnytskyi), and since 1993–94 season FC Zirka Kropyvnytskyi all time attendance record on a single game until 2017–18 season, when Metalist Kharkiv phoenix club Metalist 1925 participated in the Druha Liha together with their original club rivals FC Dnipro and SC Dnipro-1. The record was set on in a Metalist 1925–Dnipro-1 match, which was attended by 14,521 people.

#	Season	Attendance	Home team	Score	Visiting team	Stadium	Ref
1	2017–18	14,521	Metalist 1925 Kharkiv	1:1	Dnipro-1	OSC Metalist	
2	1993–94	14,000	Zirka-NIBAS Kirovohrad	2:0	FC Boryspil	Zirka Stadium	
3	2008–09	12,100	Zirka Kirovohrad	2:1	Stal Dniprodzerzhynsk	Zirka Stadium	
4	1993–94	12,000	Zirka-NIBAS Kirovohrad	5:0	Shakhtar Pavlohrad	Zirka Stadium	
4	1993–94	12,000	Zirka-NIBAS Kirovohrad	1:0	Dnister Zalishchyky	Zirka Stadium	

The most attended seasons were in the beginning of 1990s and the beginning of 2000s.
