= Chernihiv Stadium =

Ukrainian multi-purpose stadium

Olympic sports training center Chernihiv
- Gagarin Stadium
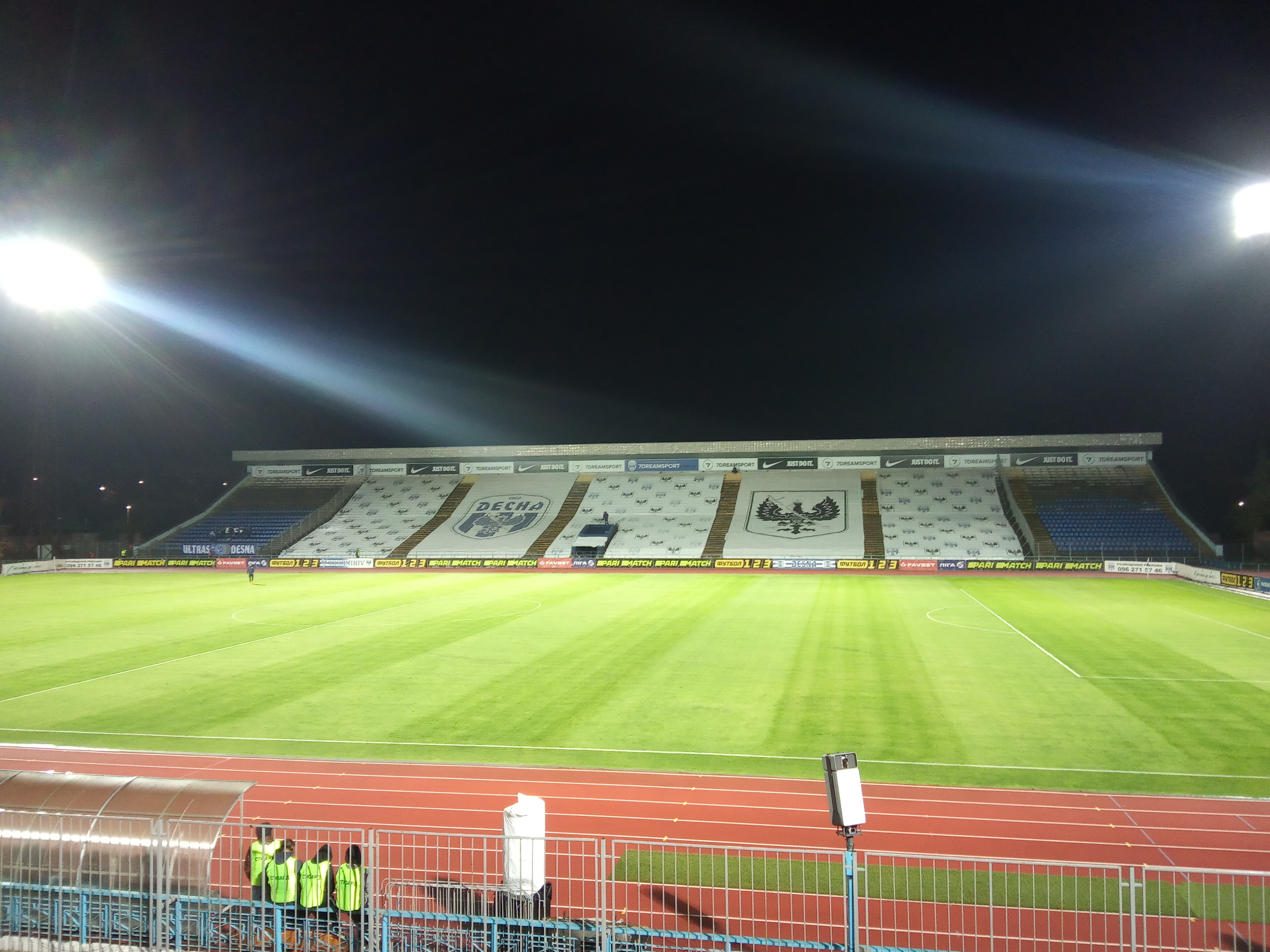
- UEFA Category 3 Stadium
- Interactive map of Olympic sports training center Chernihiv
- Location: st. Shevchenko, 61, Chernihiv, 14027 Ukraine
- Coordinates: 51°30′6″N 31°19′38″E
- Owner: Ministry of Youth and Sports of Ukraine
- Capacity: 12,060
- Surface: Grass
- Field size: 105x68

Construction
- Opened: 1936
- Renovated: 1960
- Expanded: 1980s

Tenants
- FC Desna Chernihiv; Ukrainian Women's National Team; WFC Lehenda-ShVSM Chernihiv; Desna-2 Chernihiv; Desna-3 Chernihiv; SDYuShOR Desna; Olimpik Donetsk

Olympic Sports Training Center Chernihiv (formerly Yuri Gagarin Stadium) (Ukrainian: Олімпійський навчально-спортивний центр «Чернігів») is a multi-purpose stadium in Chernihiv, Ukraine. The stadium was given status of Olympic preparation and brought under the administration of the Ministry of Youth and Sports. It is located in Tarnovsky house, in Shevchenko street 61.

It is currently used mostly for football matches, and is the home of Ukraine women's national football team and Desna Chernihiv. It has a capacity of 12,060 spectators and 5,500 individual plastic seats.

== Description ==
Beside its main arena, the football field, the center houses four sports schools and several sports sections. There are a boxing hall, a running track, a fitness room (weightlifting/gymnastics), a massage room, an electronic scoreboard, a controlled-access entrance. The field has a water sprinkle system and floodlights. The center conducts competitions in athletics (track and field), football, boxing, and weightlifting.

There is a prospective project on reconstructing the center into a sports city "Luchisty" (Radiant) which beside the football stadium (3,000 seats) would include an ice arena (4,000 seats), a fitness-recreational complex (swimming pool, indoor field, and numbers of other sports halls), and a beach club (including a beach stadium, open air fitness rooms and swimming pools, and sauna). The sports complex also would include a hotel complex with 175 rooms.

The stadium houses the Chernihiv boxing club "Ring", sports school "Atlet" specializing in athletics and weightlifting, as well as specialized sports school "Desna" specializing in association football. The Yuri Gagarin Stadium offers a mix of concessions for supporters. Be prepared to queue as they are very popular with visitors, but there lack some in terms of facilities in particular, in the van of the gadgets they don't accept credit card but only cash for the moment. There are hot food is available from the bbq, and the fryers. There are also cold snacks available.

== History ==
=== Early years ===
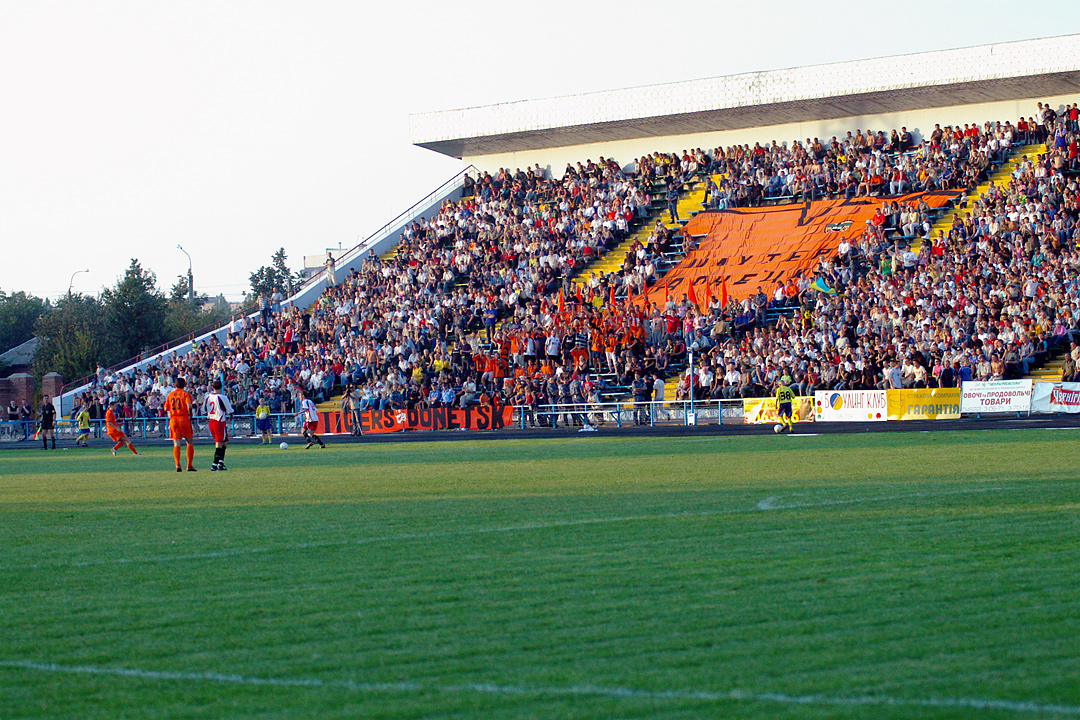
Desna at the Chernihiv Stadium during the match with Shakhtar Donetsk

The history of Chernihiv Stadium dates back to 1936 for 3,000 spectators in eastern portion of a city park (garden) that exists since 1804. The territory of the city garden was chosen for the construction of the stadium. At the end of the 18th century, there was a dacha of the Archbishop of Chernihiv on this territory. At the beginning of the 19th century, namely in 1804, a city garden was formed on the site of the modern stadium.

During World War II, the Chernihiv Stadium was heavily damaged and in the 1950s was completely reconstructed, included stadium walls and two stands for 11,000 spectators. In 1961, it was named after the Russian Soviet cosmonaut Yuri Gagarin.

On 25 May 1964, Yuri Gagarin visited the stadium and met with Andriyan Nikolayev. In the mid-1980s, the stadium capacity was increased to 14,000. In the season 1996–97, was held the first leg of the Ukrainian Amateur Cup, between FC Domobudivnyk Chernihiv and FC Krystal Parkhomivka, ended with the victory of FC Domobudivnyk Chernihiv for 2–0.

In 2005, the reconstruction of the stadium began, which was completed in 2008 with the assistance of the then sponsor of FC "Desna" Oleksiy Savchenko, in particular, plastic seats were installed on the west stand. In October 2011, the stadium received almost ₴5 million for renovations.

In 2008, the stadium was used by Ukraine for the UEFA Women's Euro 2009 qualifying and for UEFA Women's Euro 2013 qualifying against Denmark, Portugal, Slovakia and Finland.

In 2010 Oleksandr Povorozniuk, after become president of Desna Chernihiv was ready to invest his own funds in the football club: However, the local authorities, despite promises to support the club and complete the Stadium, but at the ended he did nothing.

=== Reconstruction ===
In the summer of 2016, a large-scale reconstruction of the stadium began. The vice-president of the club Igor Bazalinsky said that the work on the stadium will be carried out in two stages: “Our plan for the reconstruction of the stadium includes two stages. The first is a training and main field, a hotel and a medical and rehabilitation center, a basement, locker rooms, new high-quality football gates, both for the main field and for the training field. This is what we have planned for this year - to create optimal living conditions and training for our team.

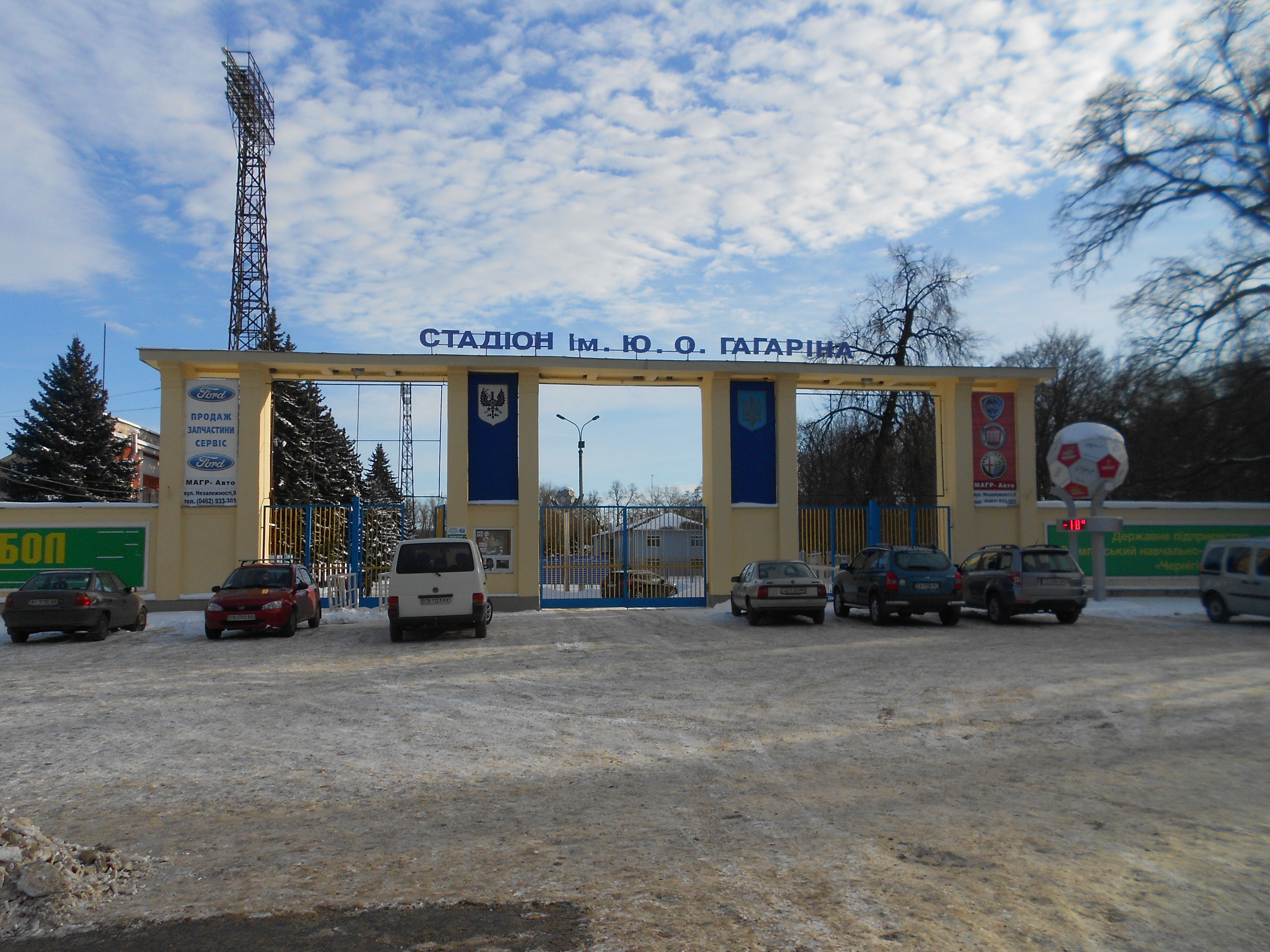
Front of the main Gate of the stadium in Chernihiv

The second stage is the tidying up of the stands, installation of plastic chairs, and the issue of possible covering of the stands. We will put in order the territory of the stadium, a children's town will be installed, under which the playground is ready. We will also decide on the North Stand, we have invited experts who will assess its condition, whether it can be reconstructed or will have to be rebuilt, after which we will make the final decision.

In the first stage, the spare and main fields will be completely replaced. Modern drainage systems, automatic lawn watering systems will be installed on both fields and a new lawn will be laid that will meet all the necessary standards. At the same time, the hotel for athletes is being renovated. ”

The training ground is ready, after the match with Skala, which took place on September 26, Chernihiv footballers returned home, where they held their first full training session on the new field and in mid-May 2017, the stadium completed the laying of the lawn.

Chernihiv City Council officially committed itself after the transfer of the stadium to the municipal property of the city. Gagarin (its official name is SE "Olympic Training and Sports Center" Chernihiv ") to use it for its intended purpose and not to alienate it to private property. Also, to preserve this sports facility as a base for Olympic training and to ensure certification in accordance with the requirements of the International Association of Athletics Federations IAAF. The transfer of such an object is carried out by the decision of the Cabinet of Ministers of Ukraine on the basis of the consent of the body authorized to manage state property, the decision of the session of the local council and in coordination with the Ministry of Finance, State Property Fund.

"Chernihiv Regional Football Federation" proposed to hold the "Winter Championship 2020" tournament and the Women's Football Committee of the Ukrainian Football Association (UAF) accepted the proposal. They will be held in Gagarin Stadium on November 17–21, 2020.

On 21 March 2021, Vitali Klitschko, the mayor of Kyiv, visited the training center, after his meeting with Vladyslav Atroshenko, the mayor of Chernihiv.

=== New tenant ===
In April 2021, due to the COVID-19 pandemic in Ukraine, Olimpik Donetsk decided to play away the home matches and they opted to play in the Stadion Yuriya Gagarina. From August 2021, attendance rose to 3087 and 3587 people attending home matches of Desna Chernihiv, considered excellent after the pandemic in the first six games of the season.

In February 2022, Volodymyr Levin the president of Desna Chernihiv, after he made public is candidacy for the Servant of the People in the 206th constituency election, he said that his task is to build and enlarge the Yuri Gagarin Stadium in Chernihiv.

On 12 April 2022 Ukraine women's national football team will play again in the stadium against Hungary for the 2023 FIFA Women's World Cup qualification in the UEFA Group B.

=== Damage and destruction ===
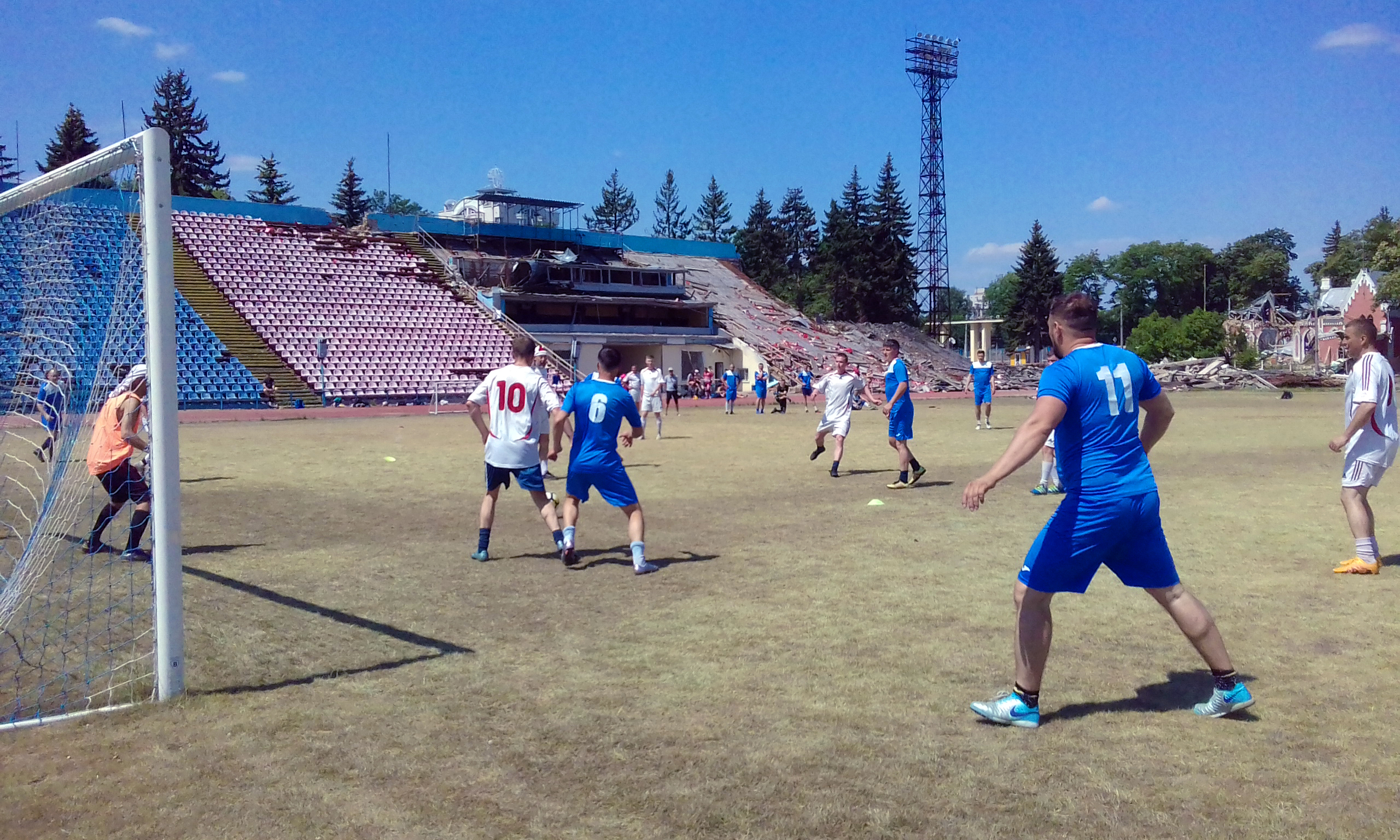
Match Desna-Albion during a charity tournament Matsuta Open at the Gagarin stadium destroyed by Russian forces. Chernihiv, June 11, 2022

On 6 March 2022, during the Siege of Chernihiv during the 2022 Russian invasion of Ukraine the stadium started to be damaged in the part of the stands near the Ultras Desna supporters' curve on the top. On or about 10–11 March 2022 the stadium was heavily damaged, possibly due to the point of destruction, by Russian forces. After the shelling, the arena turned into ruins, but a lot of equipment remained inside, but looters robbed the Desna home arena, which had been bombed by Russian occupiers the day before. The looters took advantage of the situation by snatching TVs, rehabilitation devices and other things, the Bombardier YouTube channel reported. The video also shows the office of Desna head coach Oleksandr Ryabokon - a funnel 3–4 meters deep can be seen from the window. On 13 April The Chernihiv City Council reported that hundreds of city residents, along with SES employees and SES employees began to tidy up the stadium, the process was managed by rescuers from the Main Directorate of the State Emergency Service of Ukraine in Chernihiv Oblast. Employees of the sports complex and FC Desna, fans and concerned residents of the city help them in this. On 14 April 2022, The Minister of Culture and Information Policy of Ukraine Oleksandr Tkachenko held talks with the Minister of State for Culture and Mass Media of the Office of the Federal Chancellor Claudia Roth. As a result of the conversation, it became known that Germany and Borussia Dortmund are ready to help rebuild the stadium in Chernihiv destroyed by the Russian occupation forces. On 16 April 2022, a football match took place at the Gagarin Stadium in Chernihiv, the first match, under the personal supervision of the stadium director, took place on the cleaned field of the Gagarin Stadium. The Sonechko team won 2–0. Later the head of the Chernihiv regional military administration Vyacheslav Chaus announced, that a 500-kilogram air bomb was found at the Gagarin Stadium, where the Chernihiv Olympic Training and Sports Center was destroyed by the occupiers in Chernihiv. As specified in the Main Directorate of the State Emergency Service in the region, previously, the ammunition was found under the rubble, although several times before the stadium was held and even children played football. Pyrotechnicians will take the ammunition out of the city in a special car and neutralize it there. The main stadium of Chernihiv, which was bombed by the Russian military, will be renamed. One suggestion is to name it after a deceased defender of the city and a fan of "Desna". Discussions are under way to rename the Gagarin Stadium and Smirnov Lane (in the Kota district of Chernihiv) in honor of Andriy "Sheriff" Kozachenko, a Desna fan who died in February this year defending the city from the Russian forces. The club supports such a renaming.

=== New project ===
The Minister of Youth and Sports of Ukraine Vadym Gutzait announced this preliminary amount to the public. According to him, the ministry plans to demolish what is left of the sports arena in Chernihiv and build a new one. 10 million dollars are needed for the reconstruction of the Gagarin Stadium in Chernihiv. At the end of July 2022, the stadium director Andriy Volkov told Vyacheslav Chaus, the governor of Chernihiv Oblast, that they sent letters to Europe's leading football clubs and sports associations asking for help in rebuilding the stadium in Chernihiv, which was destroyed by rioters in an airstrike in March. In particular they asked to Barcelona for some founds in order to help the reconstruction after the end of the war. The director said that they funds for dismantling and a new project. Borussia Dortmund promised to help, but not in reconstruction. Their help was not significant. The reconstruction of the central stadium in Chernihiv requires a total of about 10 million euros. Currently, money is being collected for the examination of the surviving tribune, the dismantling of the destroyed one and the future project of the new arena.

== Main uses ==
- The stadium also was mainly used by Desna Chernihiv the main team of Chernihiv
- The stadium also was used by Olimpik Donetsk in 2021, due to COVID-19 pandemic
- The matches of the Ukrainian Women's League and First Leagues of the Championship of Ukraine among women's teams, trainings and friendly matches of the Ukrainian Women's National Team of Ukraine.
- The stadium was also used by WFC Lehenda-ShVSM Chernihiv
- The Stadium hosted also match of Ukrainian Premier League, Ukrainian First League, Ukrainian Second League and Ukrainian Cup.
- The stadium is used in the past by Desna-2 Chernihiv, Desna-3 Chernihiv and SDYuShOR Desna.
- The stadium was used by FC Chernihiv, the second main team of the city before build the Chernihiv Arena.

== Transport connections ==
The stadium is served by public transport from Krasna Square that stop just beside the stadium and from the main Chernihiv–Ovruch railway train station or taxi just outside the station.

Service	Location	Route
Chernihiv Bus	Krasna Square	Direct to stadium
Chernihiv Bus	Chernihiv–Ovruch railway	Direct to stadium

== Important matches ==
=== Ukraine women's national team ===
Since 2008 the Ukraine women's national football team, started to use the stadium also for UEFA Women's Euro qualify stages.

Date	Time	Team #1	Result	Team #2	Round	Attendance	Source
22 June 2008	18:00 CEST	Ukraine	1-0	Denmark	UEFA Women's Euro 2009 qualifying		
27 September 2008	18:00 CEST	Ukraine	1–1	Portugal	UEFA Women's Euro 2009 qualifying		
11 September 2010	18:00 CEST	Ukraine	0–1	Norway	FIFA Women's World Cup qualification	5,000	
2 October 2010	18:00 CEST	Ukraine	0–3	Italy	FIFA Women's World Cup qualification		
22 October 2011	15:00 CEST	Ukraine	0-0	Slovakia	UEFA Women's Euro 2013 qualifying	3,200	
16 June 2012	17:00 CEST	Ukraine	1-2	Finland	UEFA Women's Euro 2013 qualifying	1,100	

=== Ukrainian Amateur Cup ===
In 1997 the first leg of the Final of Ukrainian Amateur Cup was held between FC Domobudivnyk Chernihiv and FC Krystal Parkhomivka, ended with the victory of FC Domobudivnyk Chernihiv for 2–0 in the season 1996–97.

Date	Time	Team #1	Result	Team #2	Competition	Season
17 September 1992	18:00	(Ukraine) FC Domobudivnyk Chernihiv	1–1	(Ukraine) FC Krystal Parkhomivka	Ukrainian Amateur Cup	1996–97

== Gallery ==
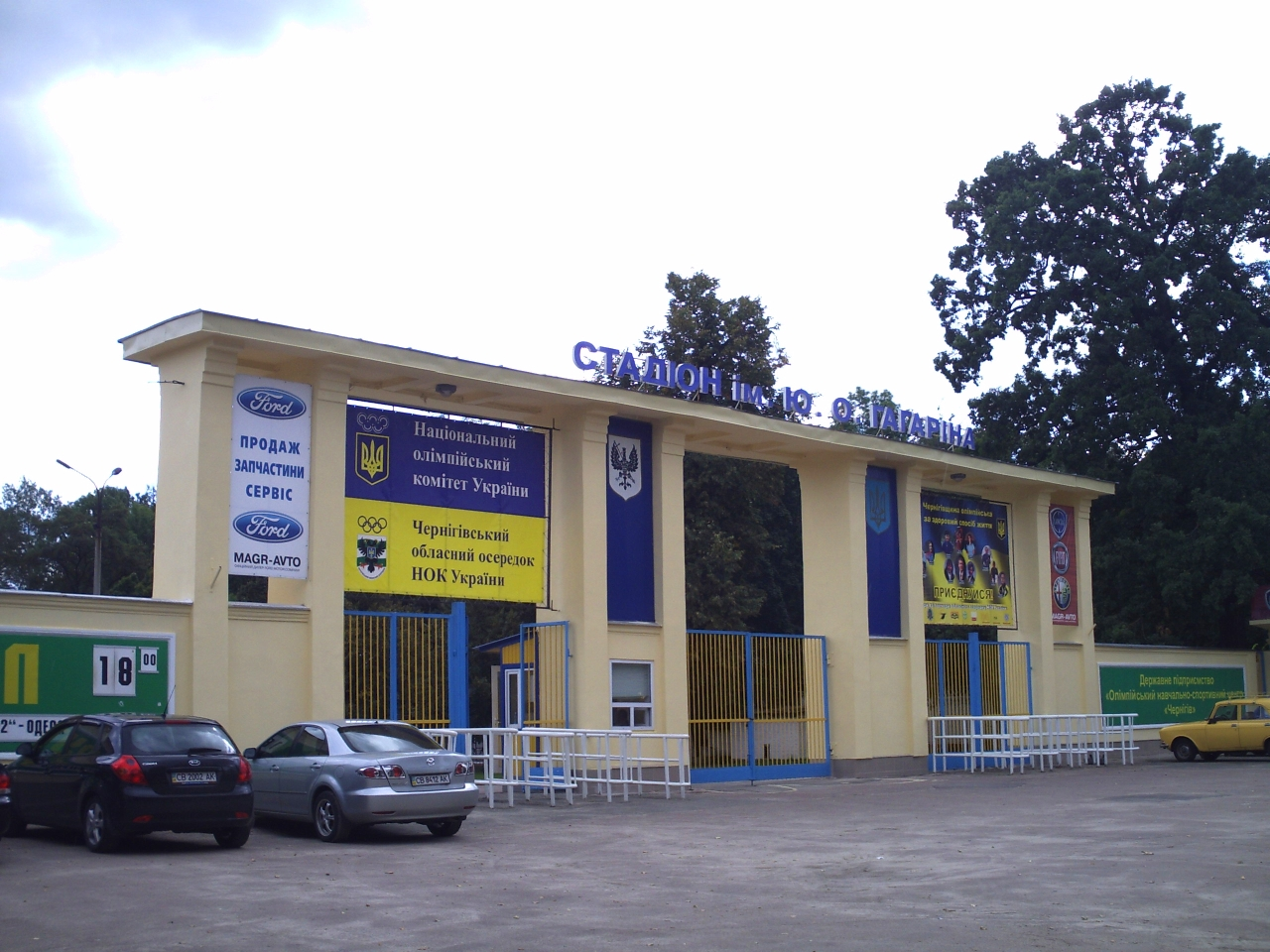
Main Gate of the stadium in Chernihiv

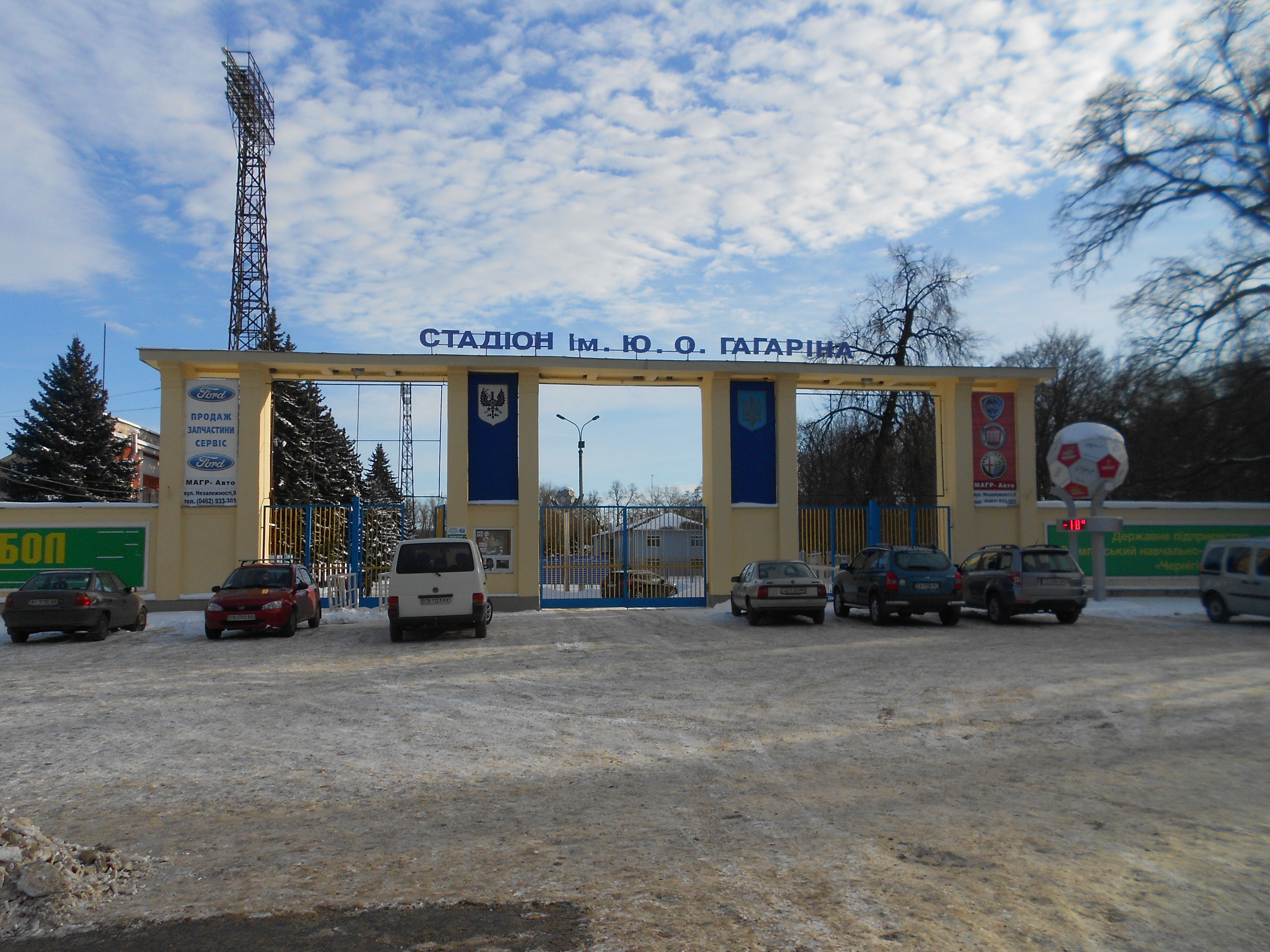
Front of the main Gate of the stadium in Chernihiv

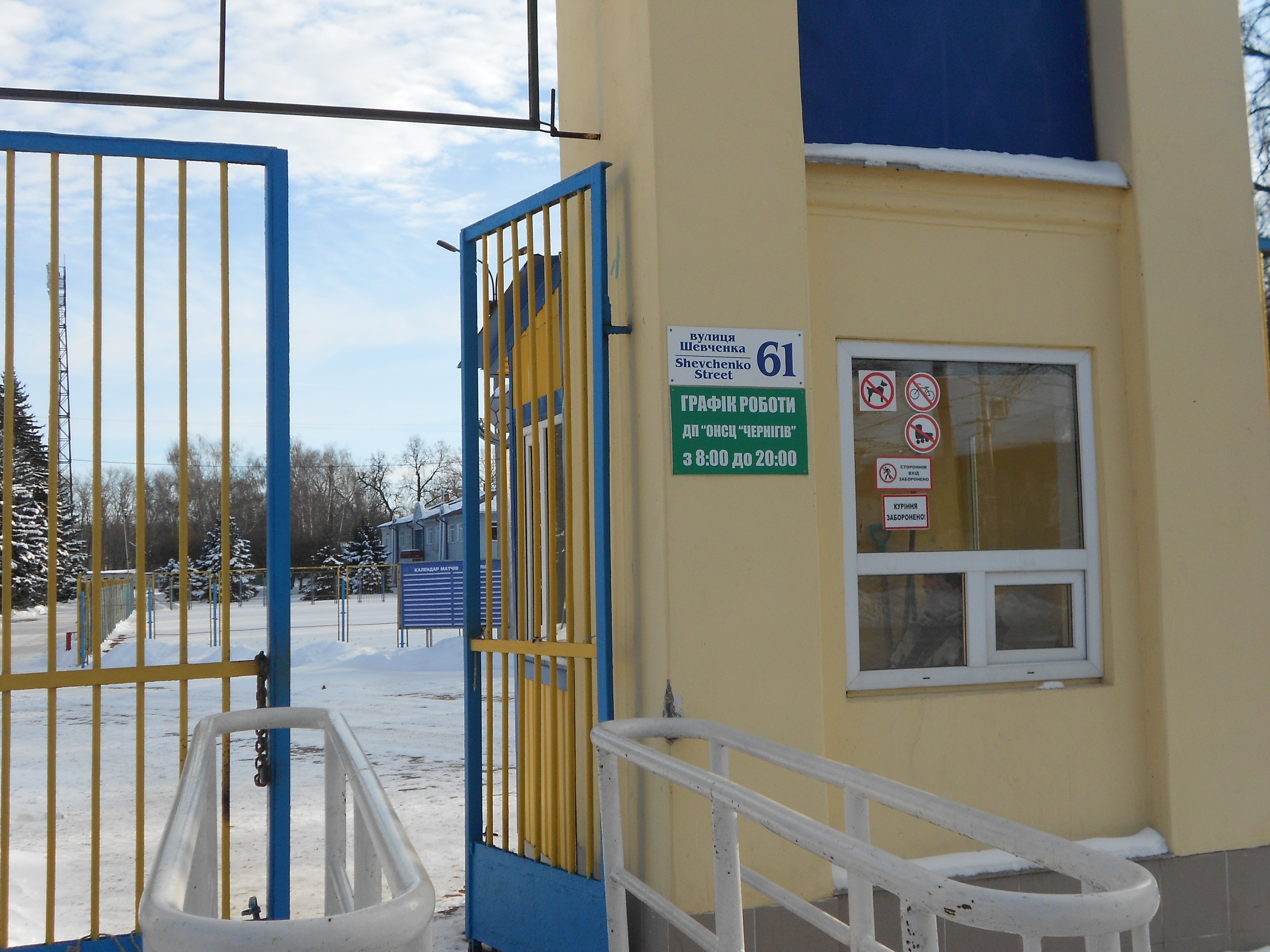
Tickets Office at the main entrance

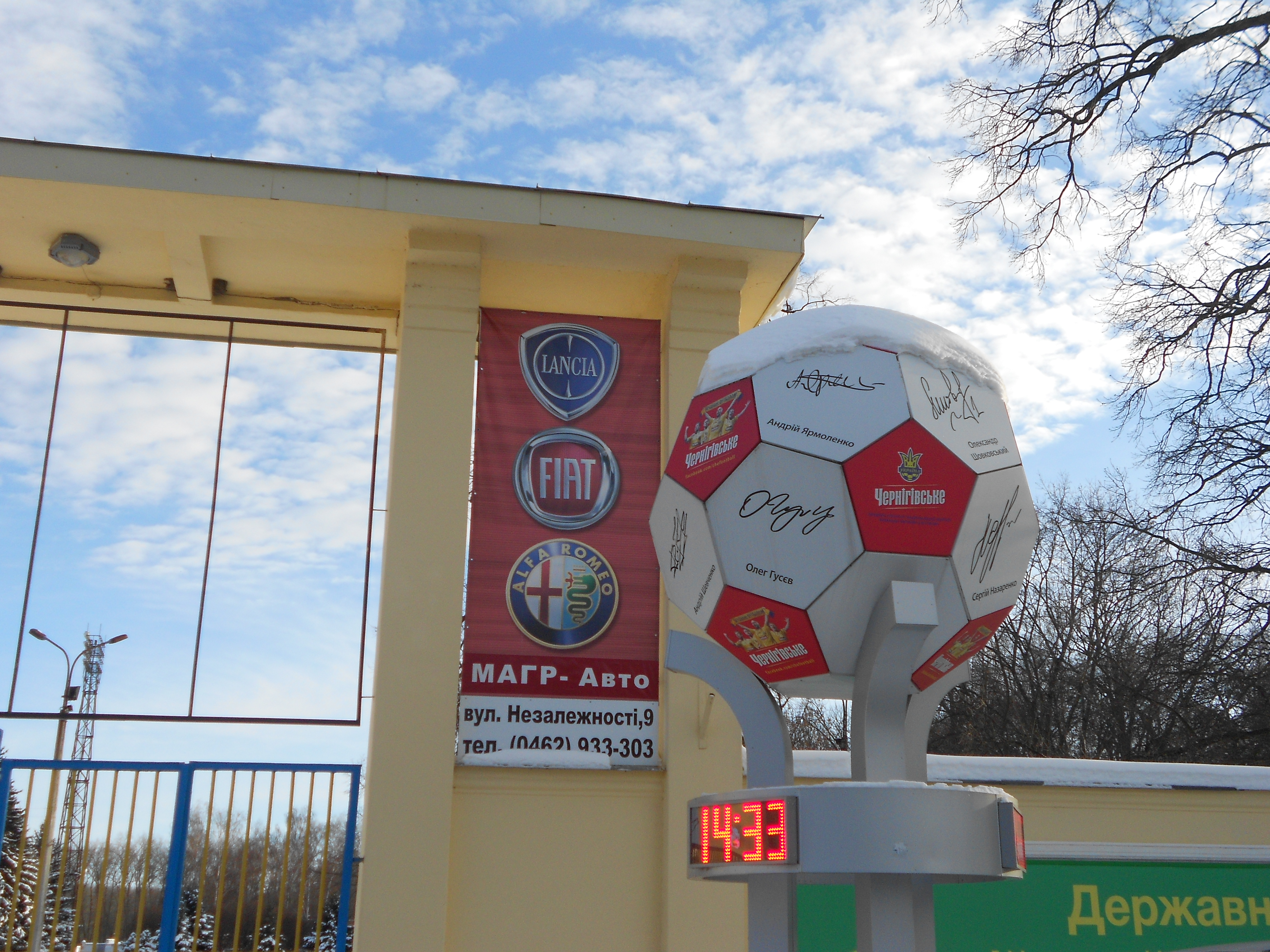
Main Door of the stadium in Chernihiv

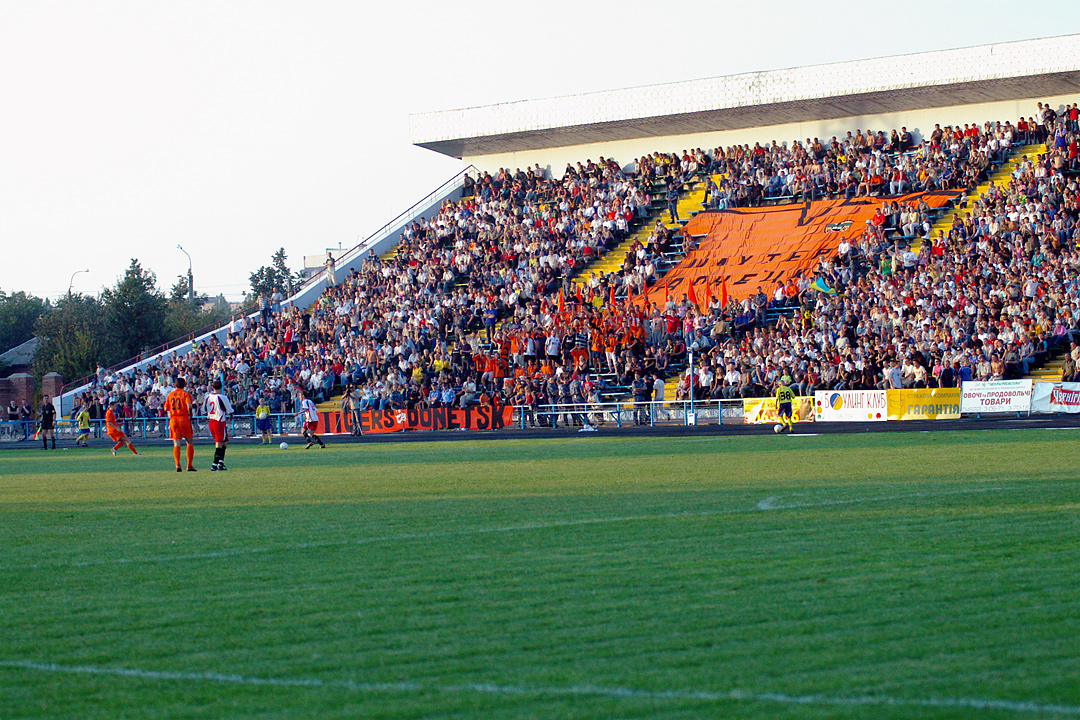
Shakhtar Donetsk and their supporter at the stadium in Chernihiv

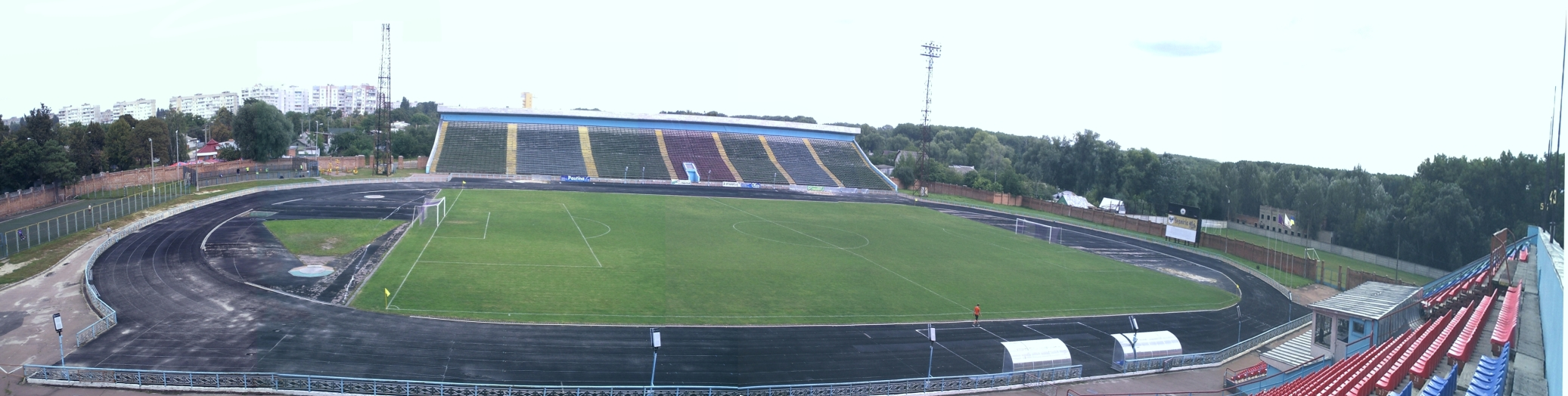
Full view of the Yuriya Gagarina stadium in Chernihiv

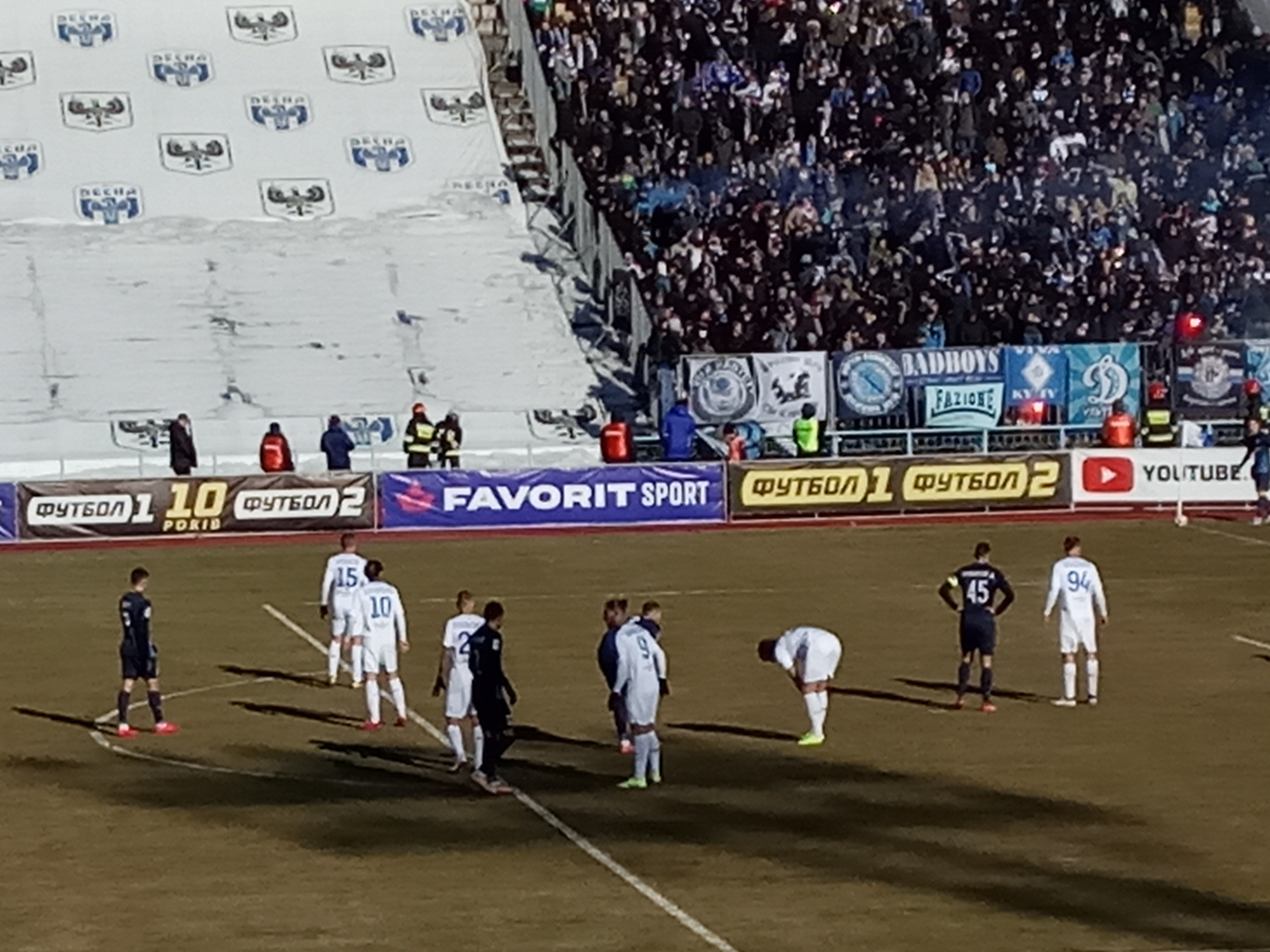
Desna Chernihiv against Dynamo Kyiv

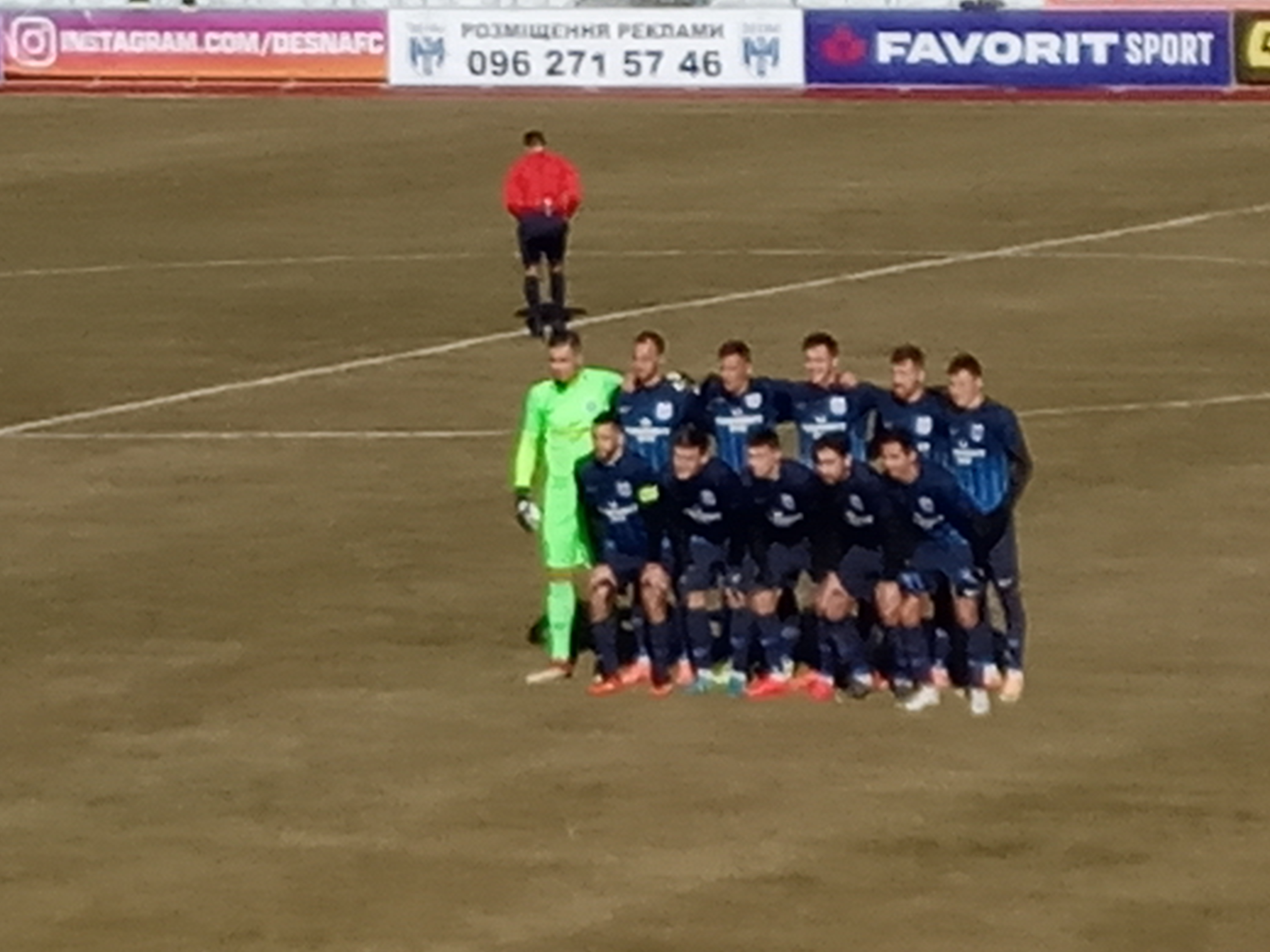
FC Desna Chernihiv before the match against Dynamo Kyiv

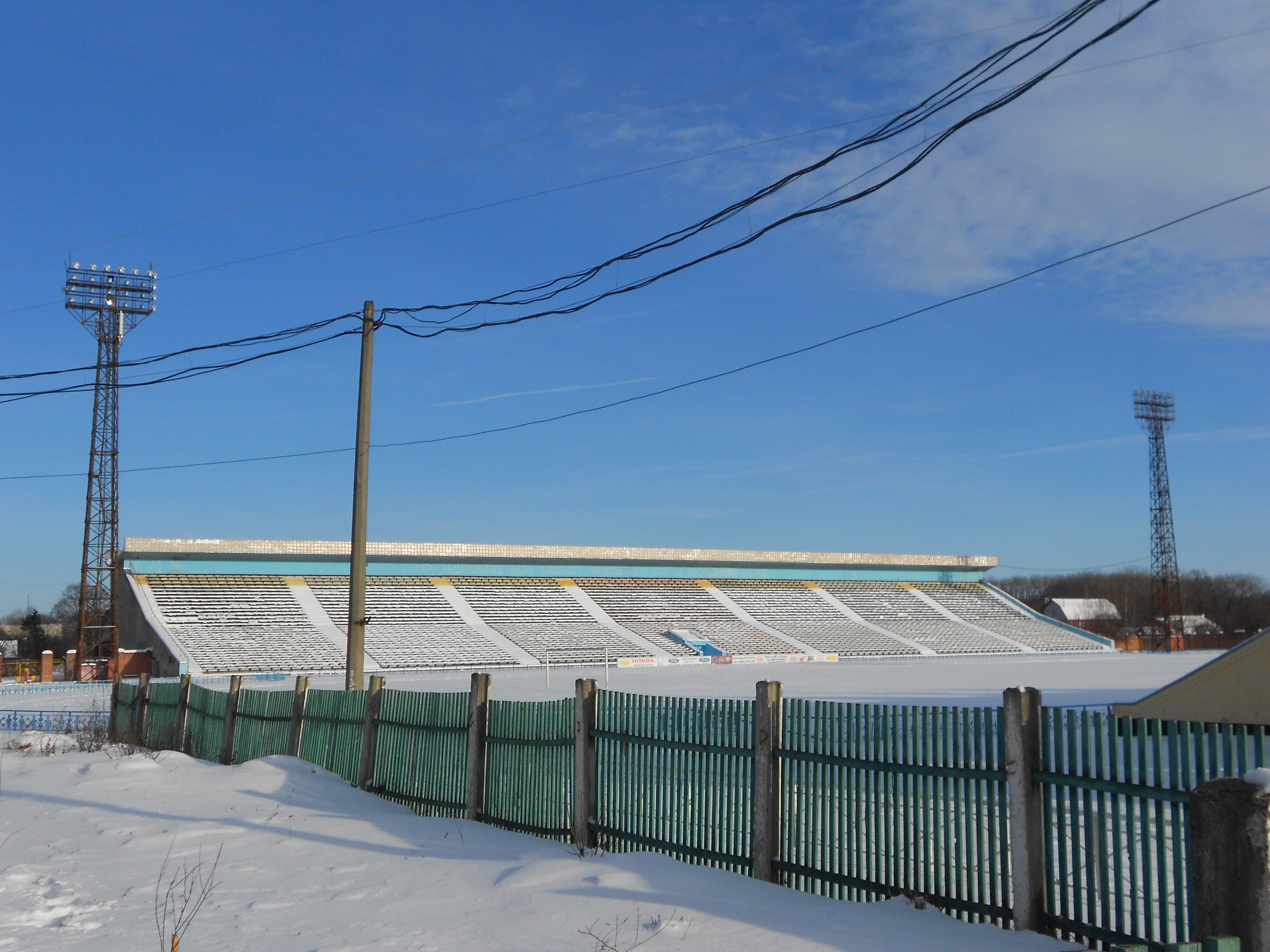
Yuriya Gagarina stadium snowed in within Chernihiv

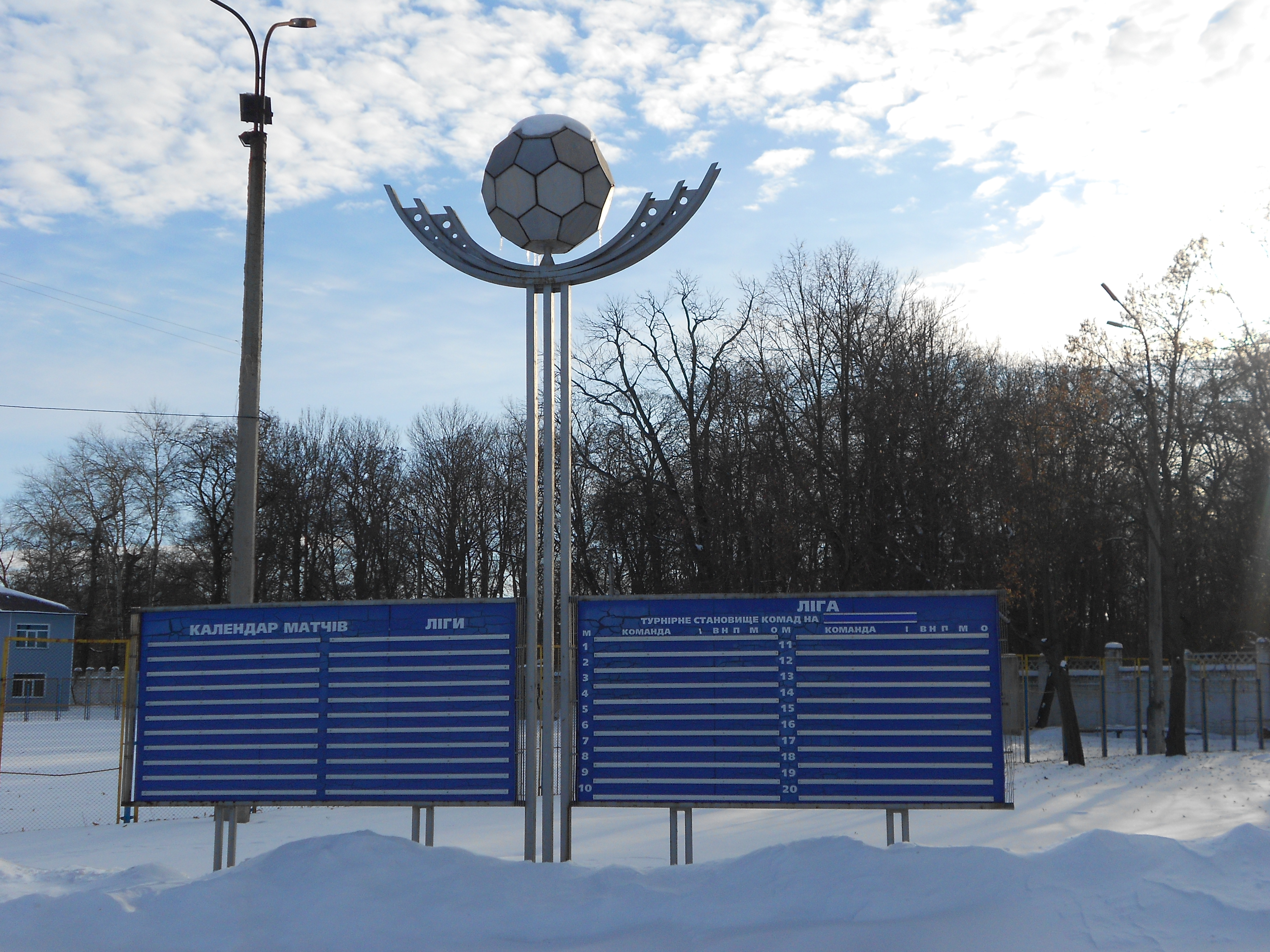
Yuriya Gagarina stadium snowed in within Chernihiv

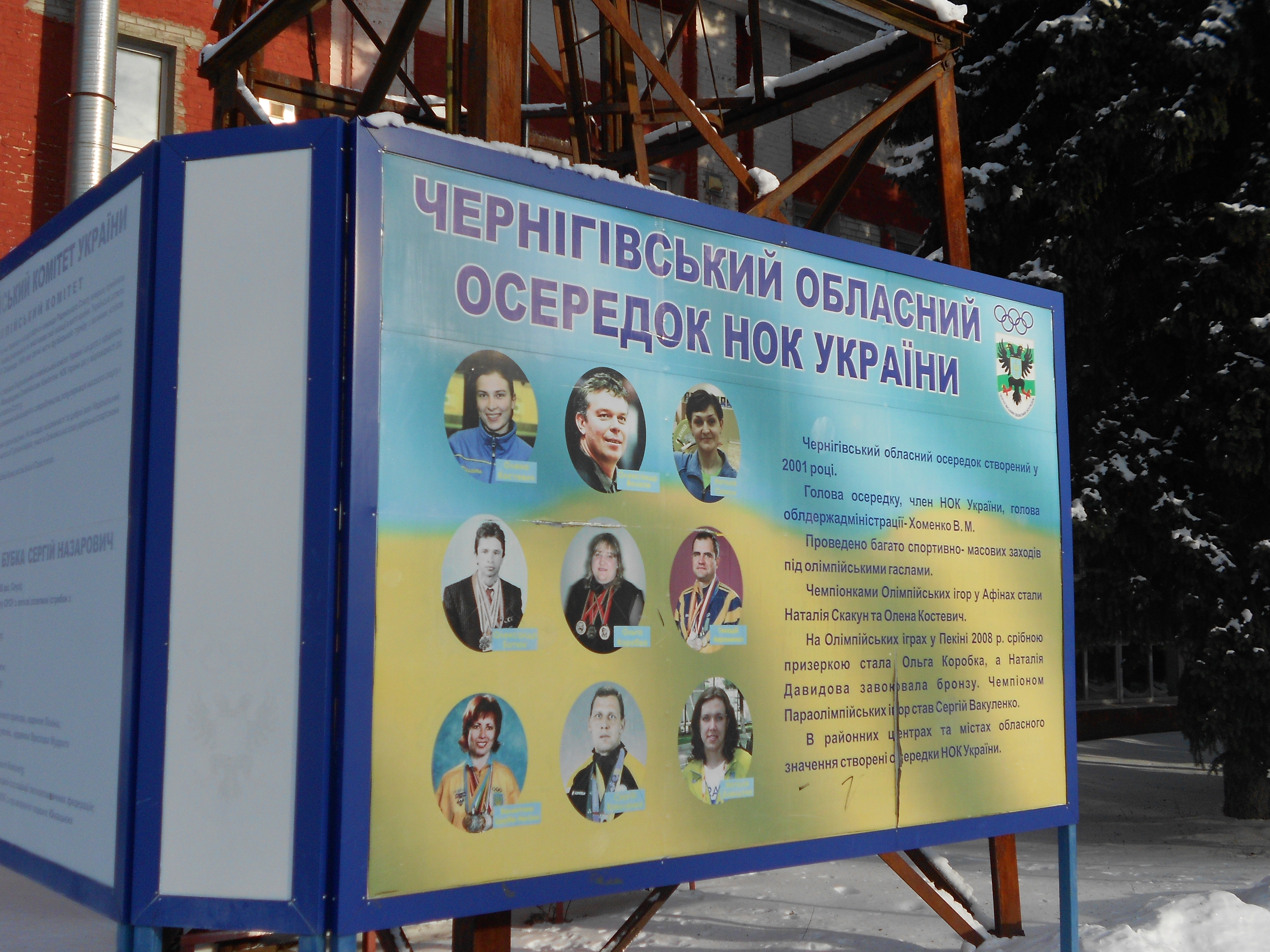
Advertising sign of the stadium

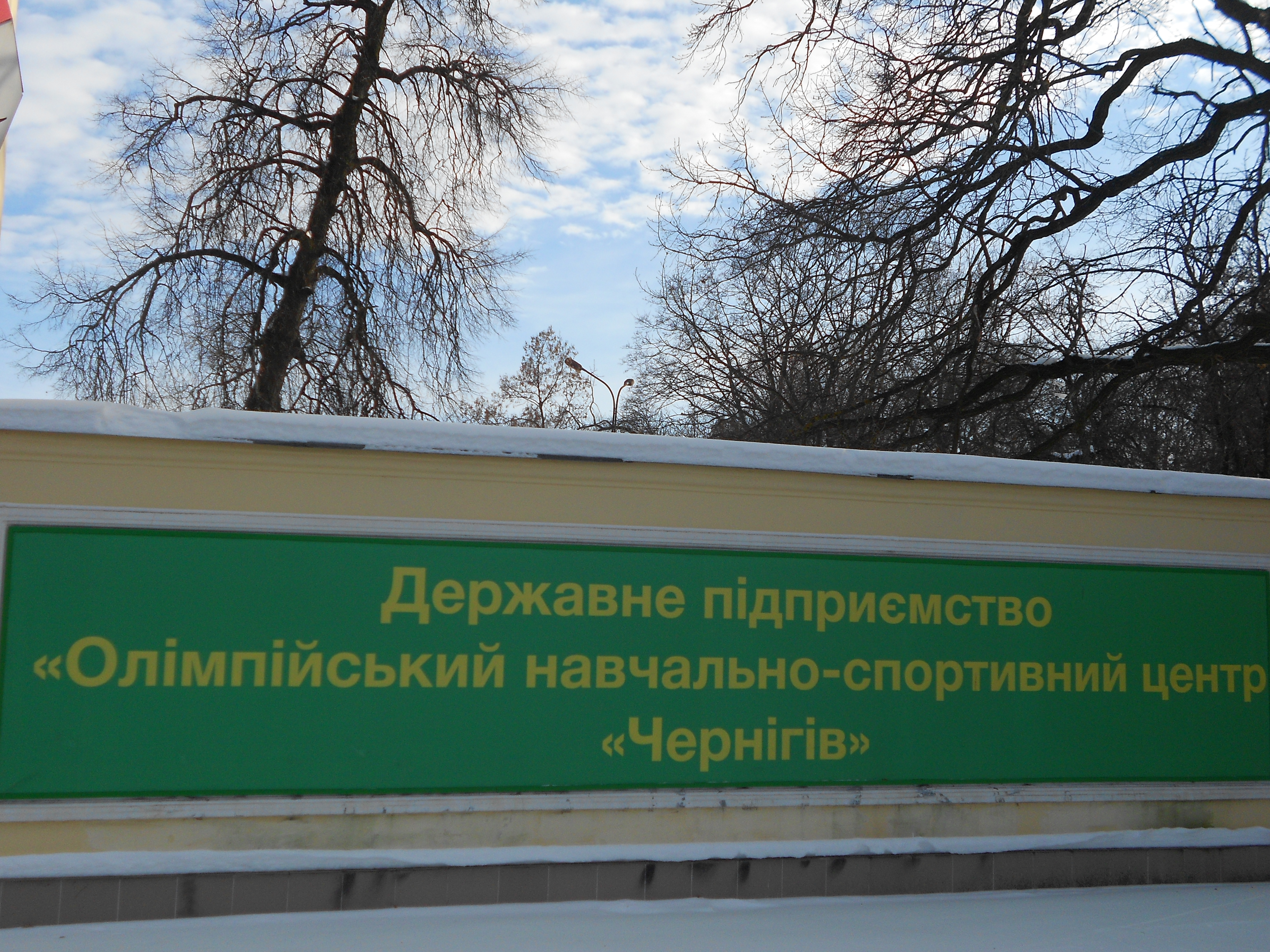
Advertising sign of the stadium

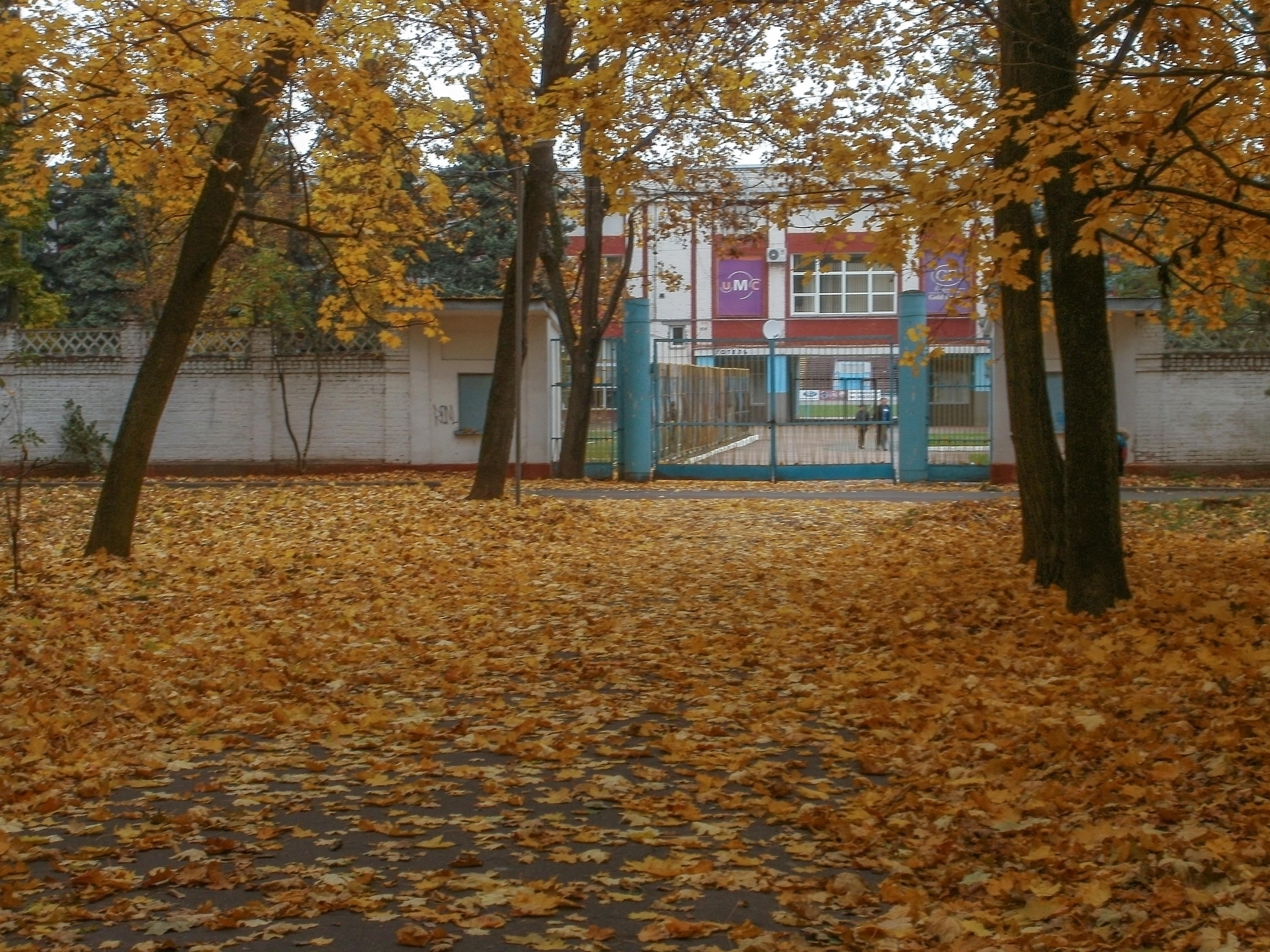
beside the stadium in Chernihiv

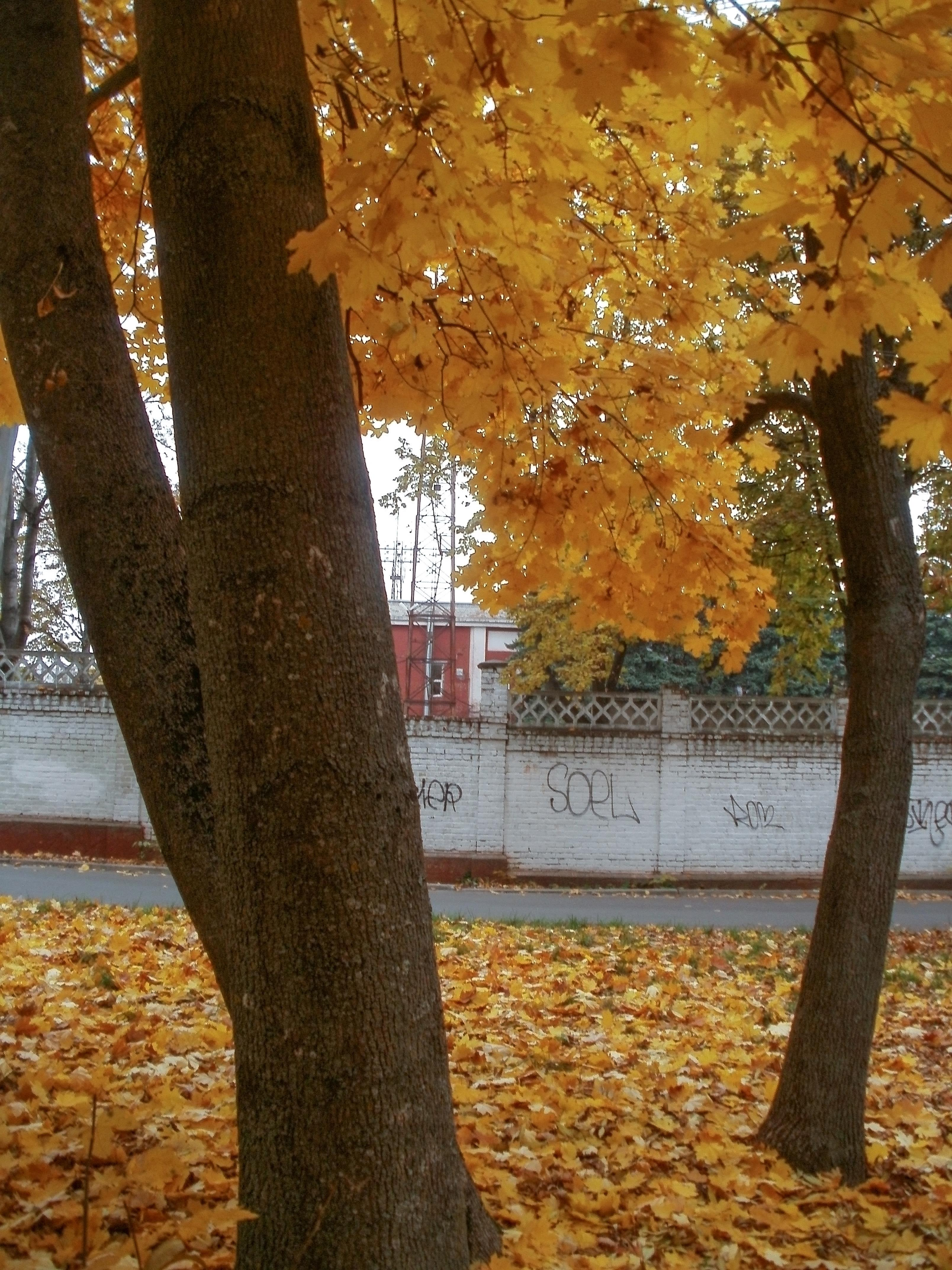
beside the stadium in Chernihiv

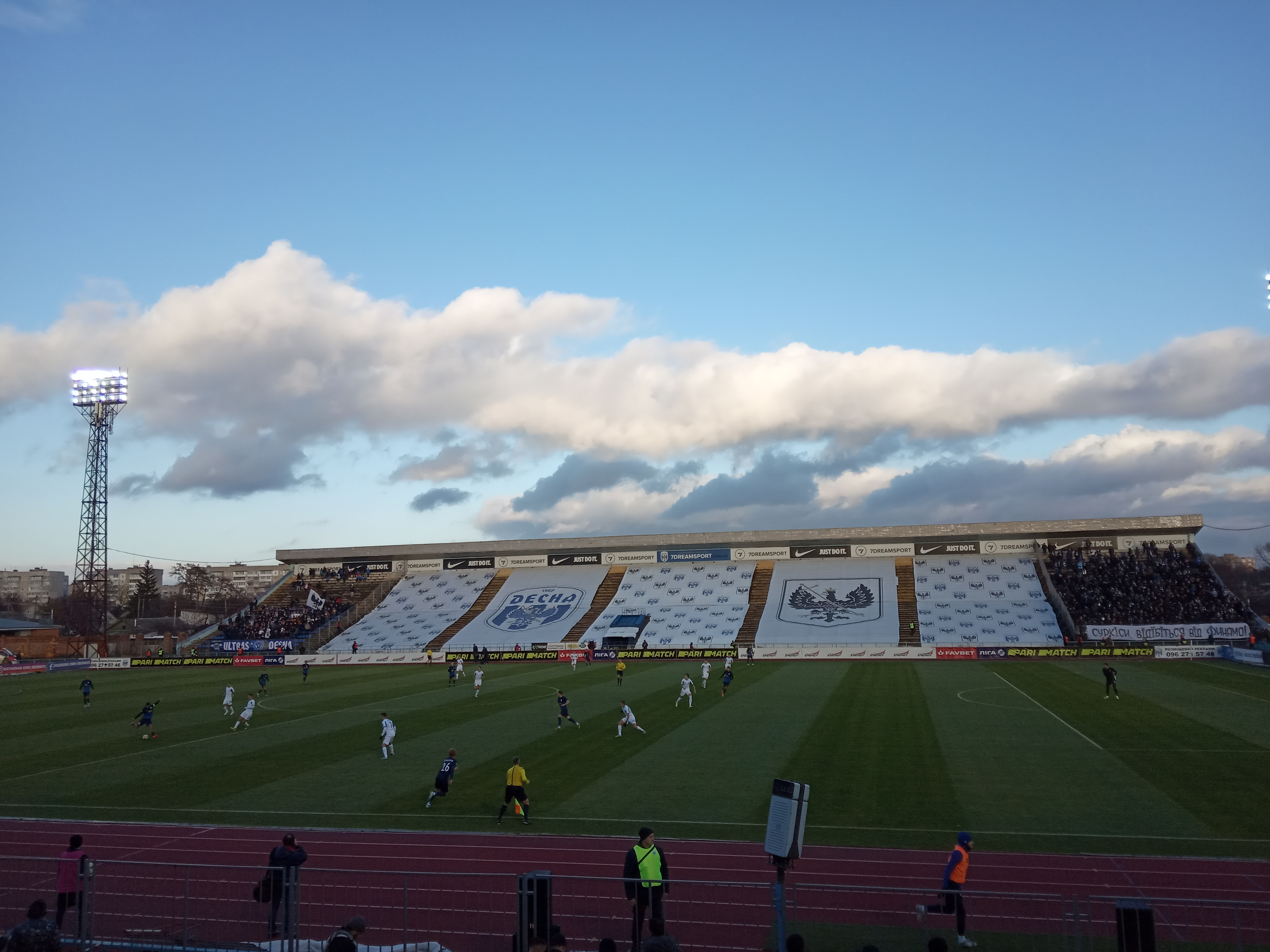
Desna Chernihiv against Dynamo Kyiv (December 2019)

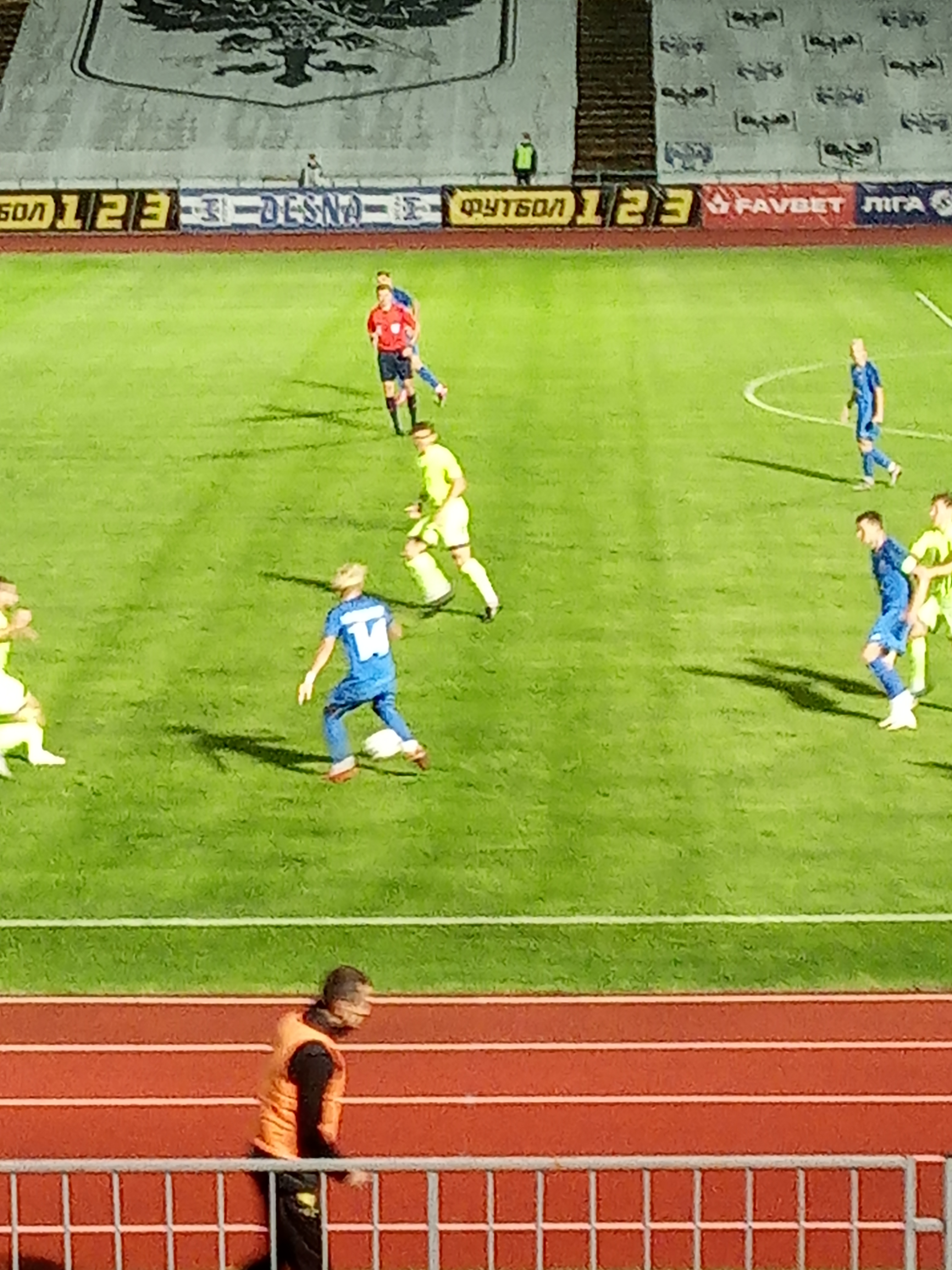

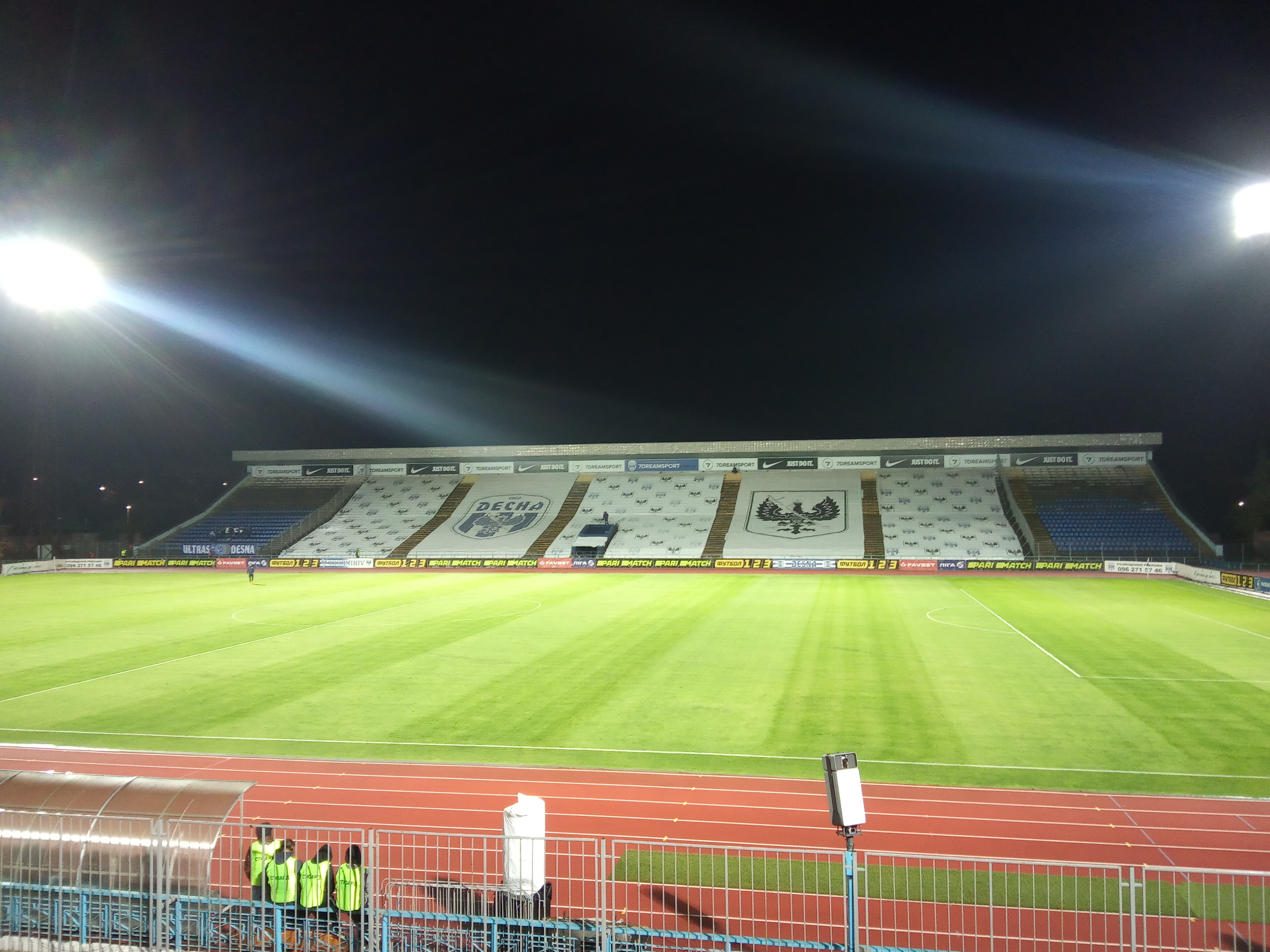

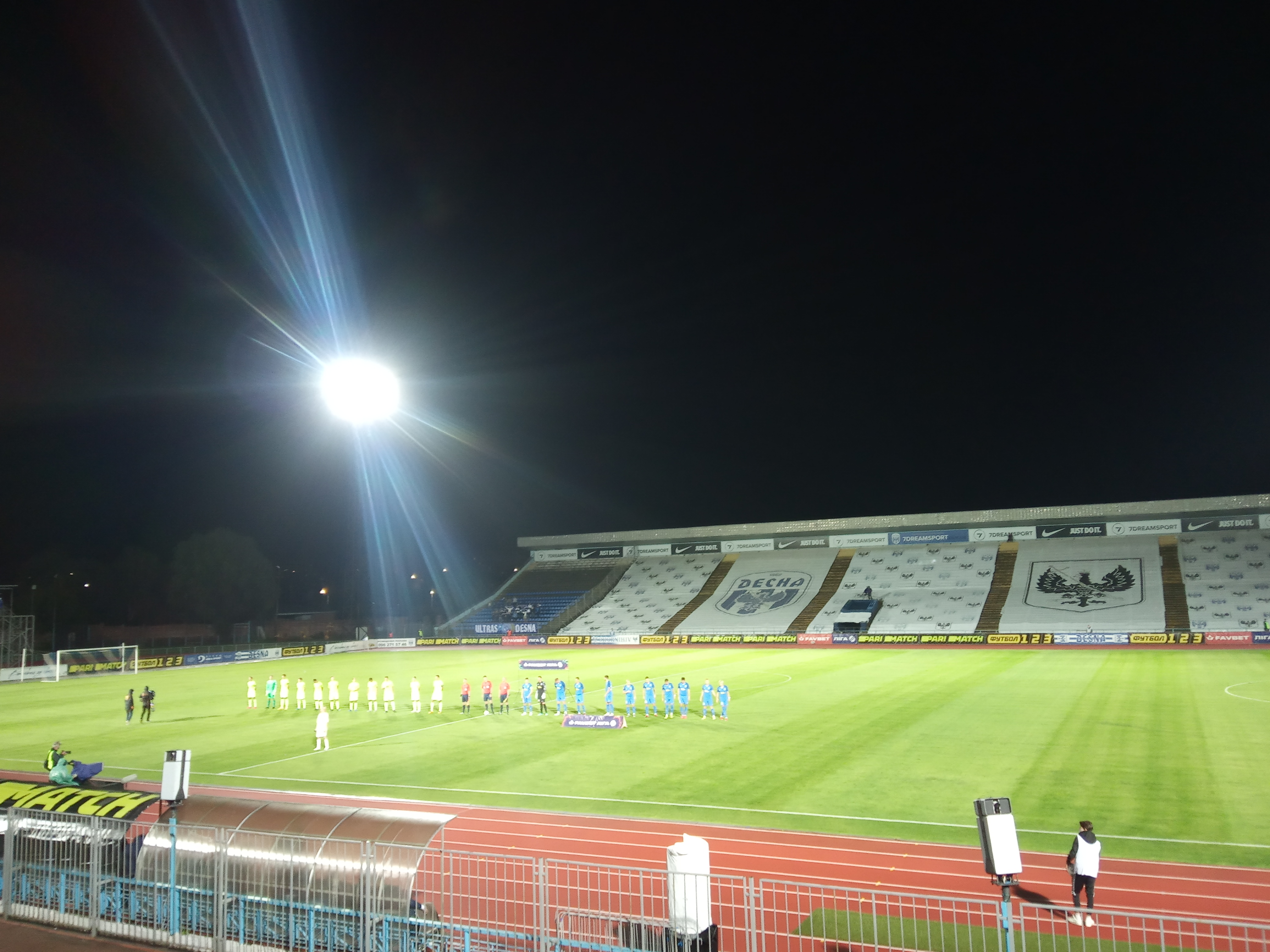

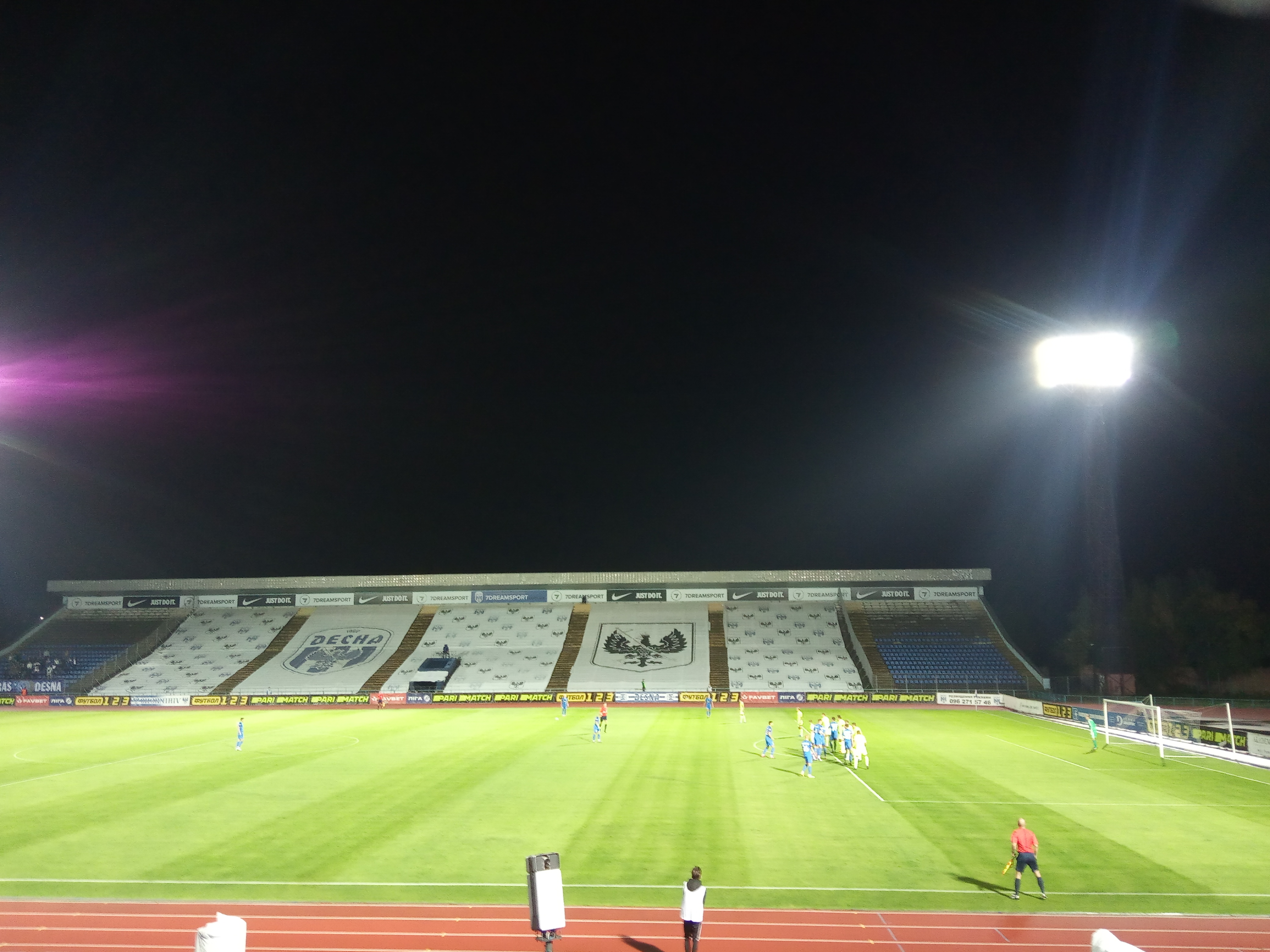

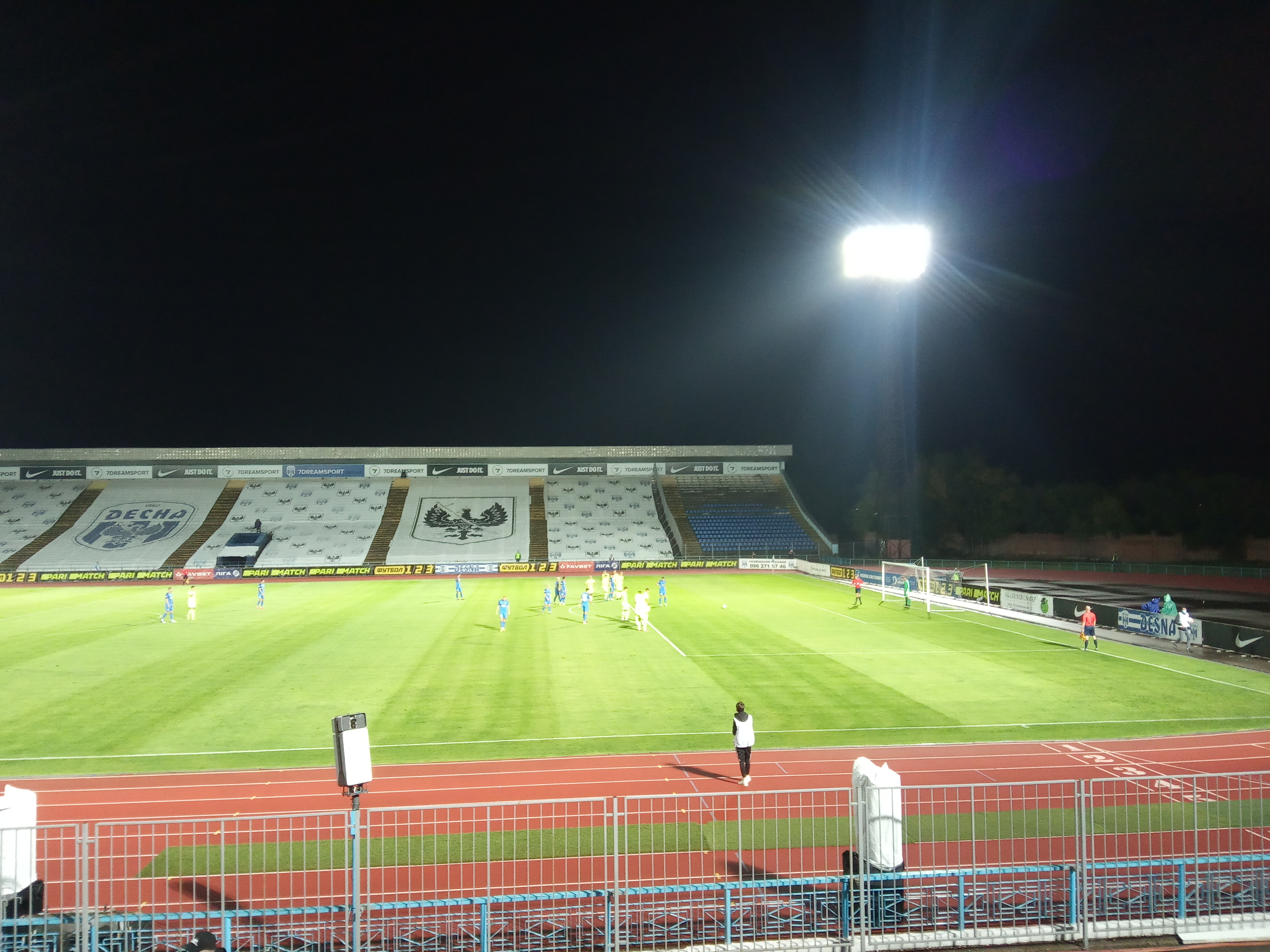

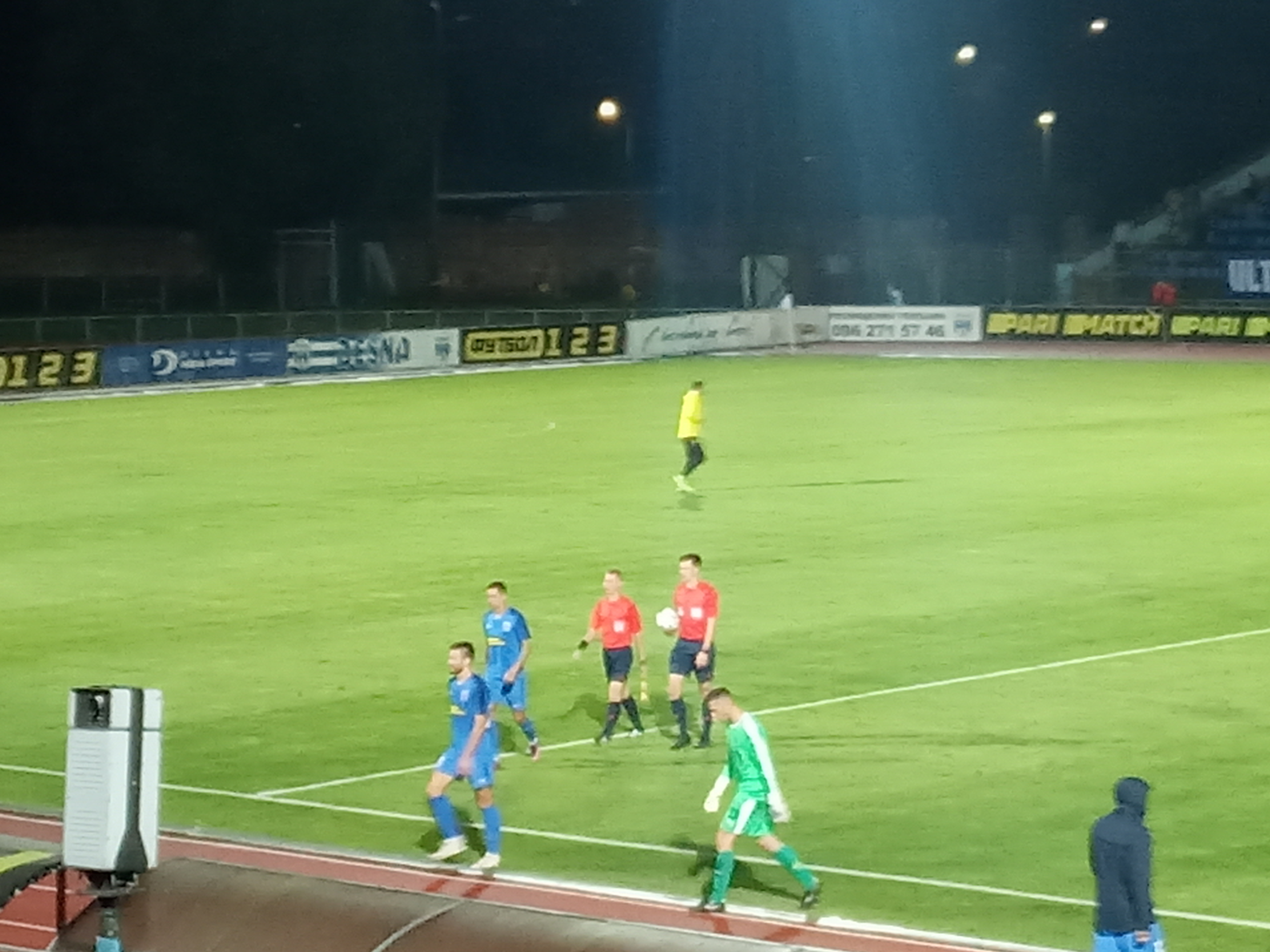

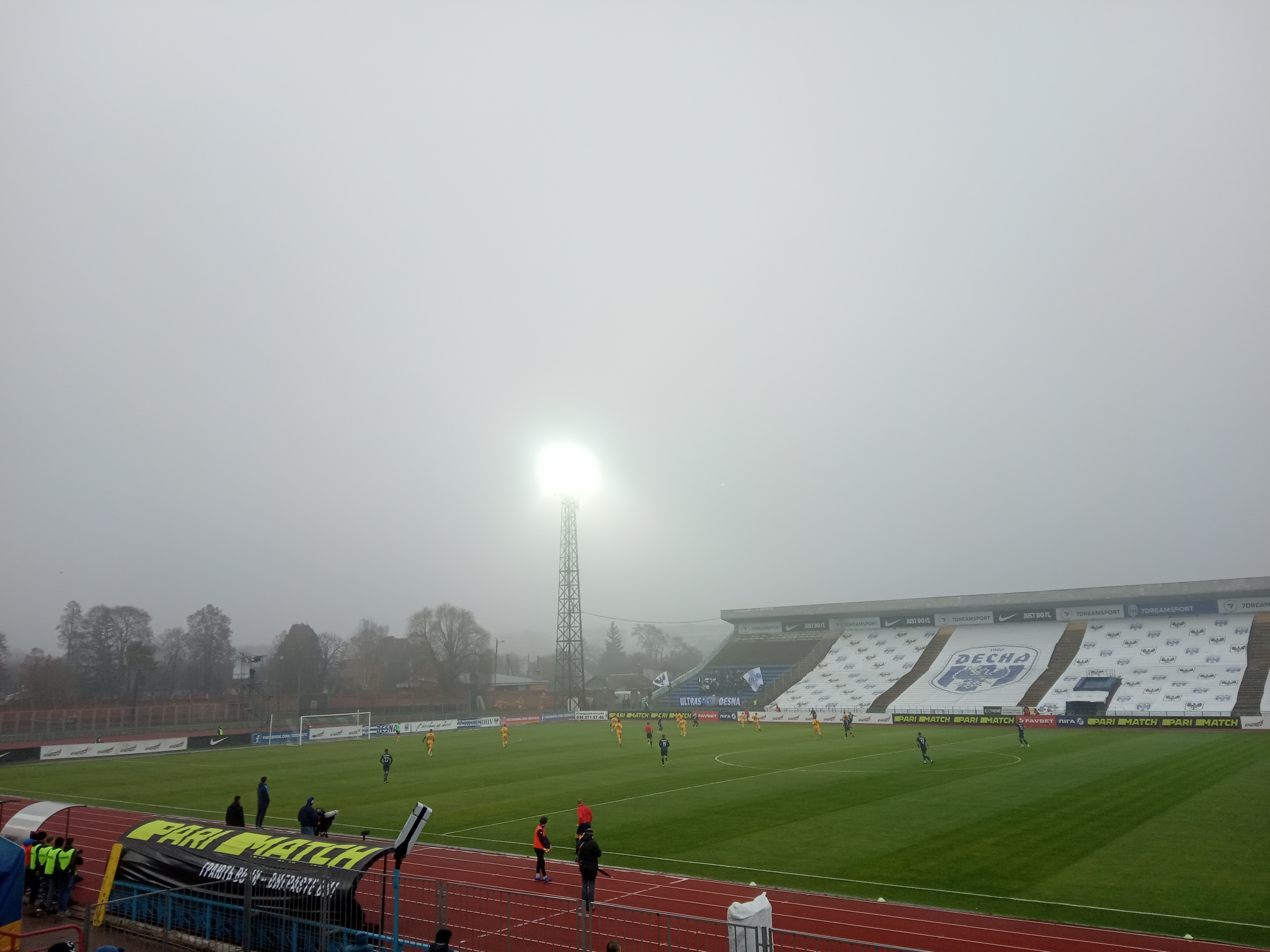

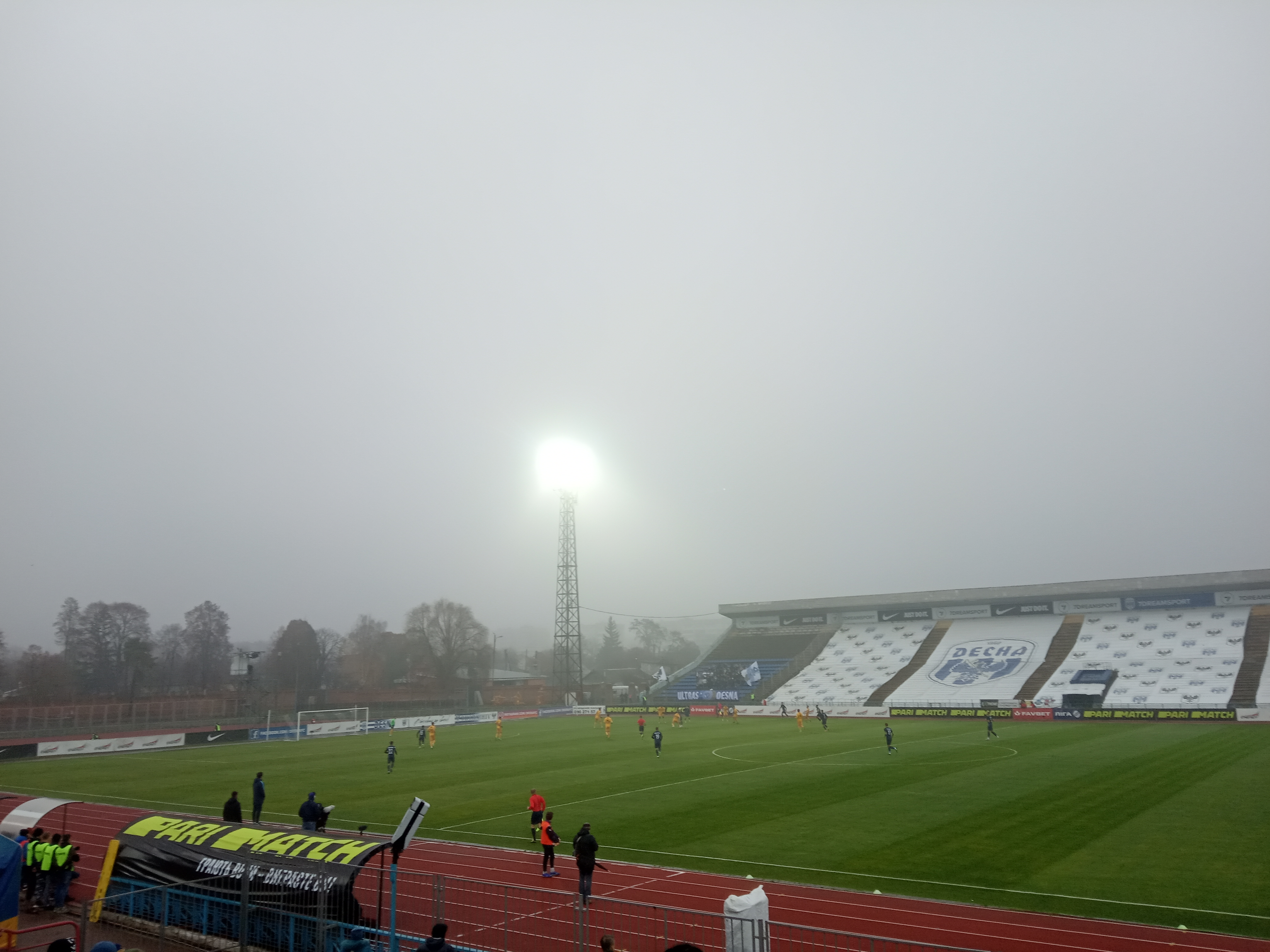

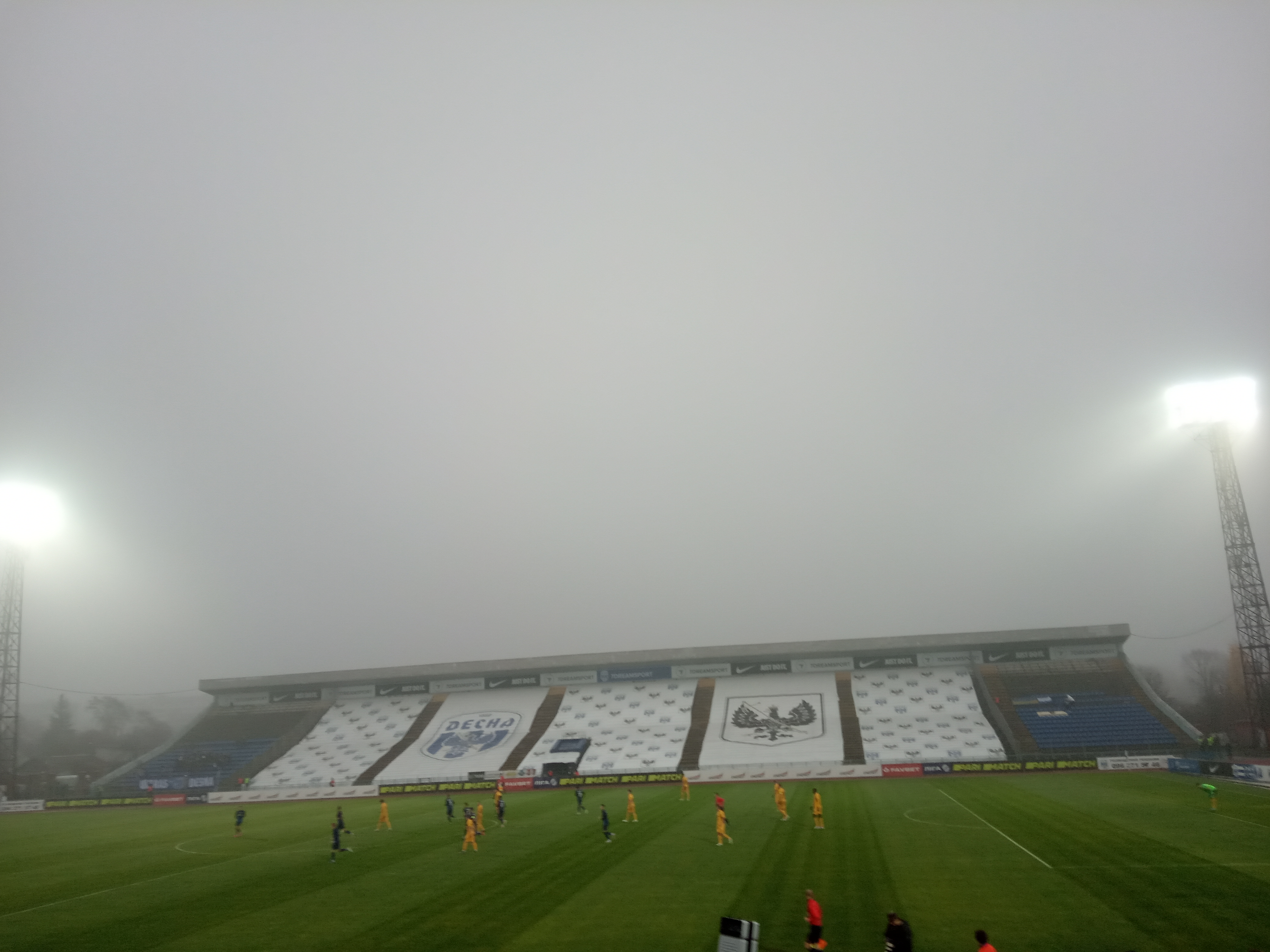

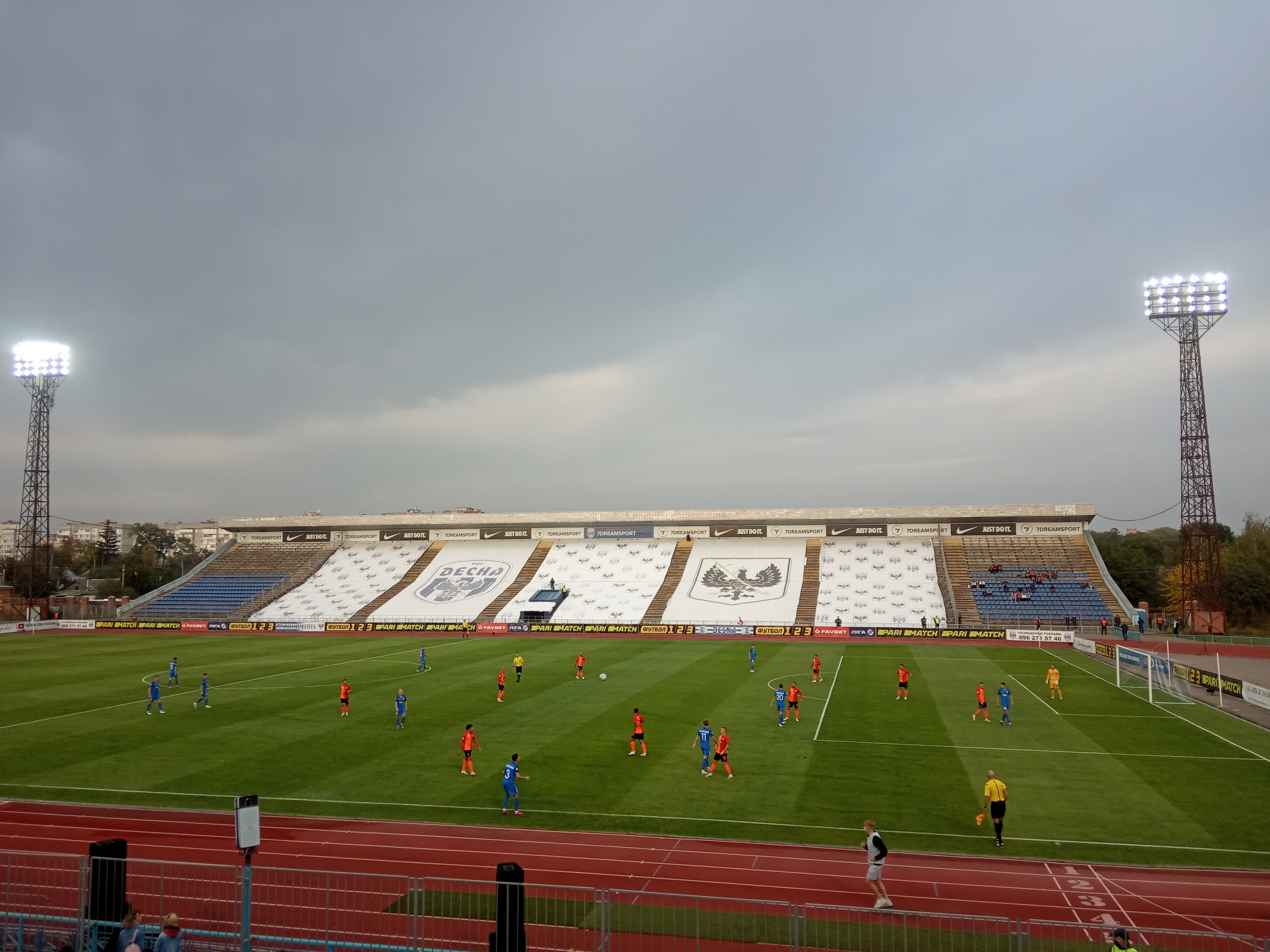

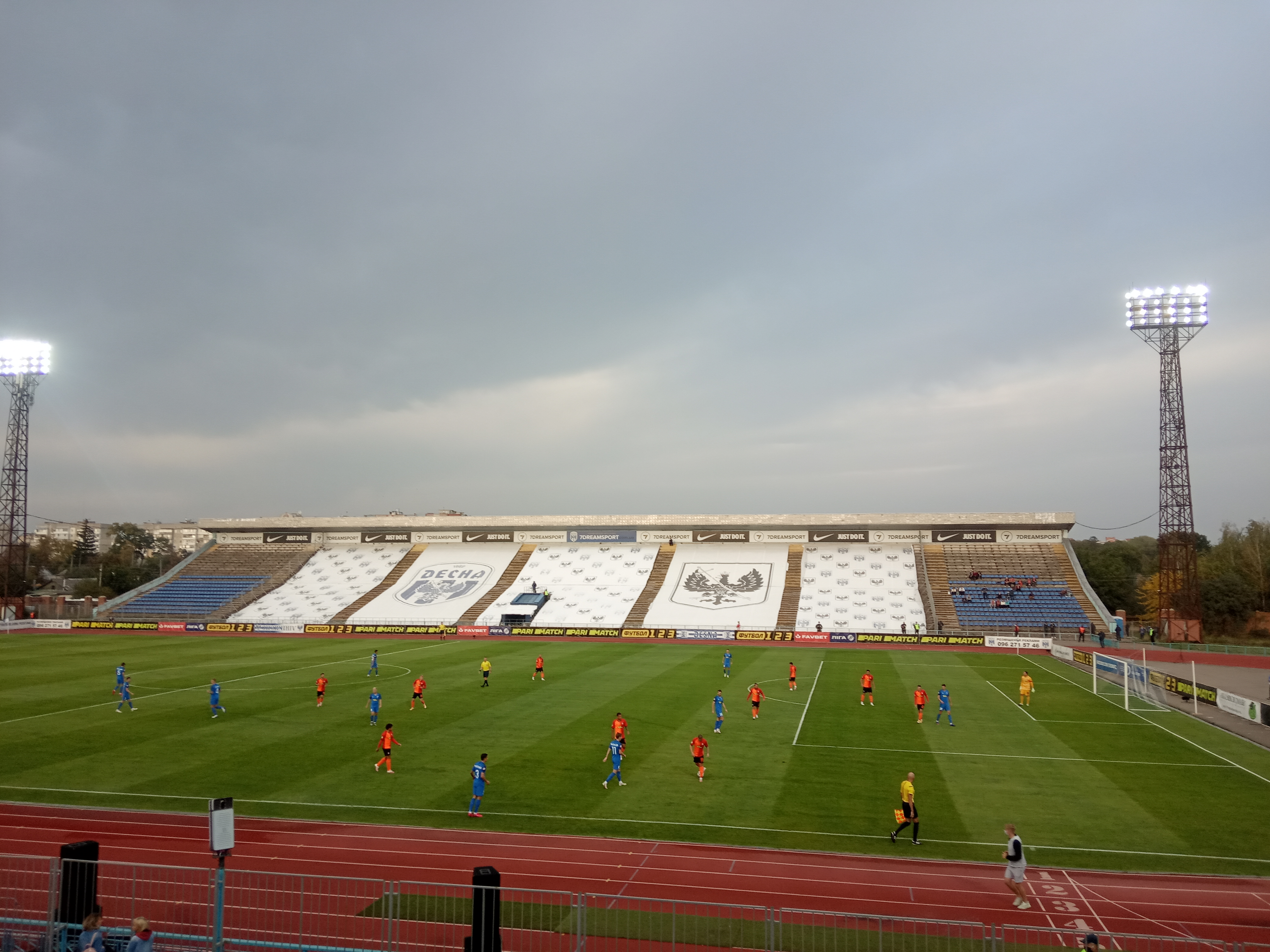

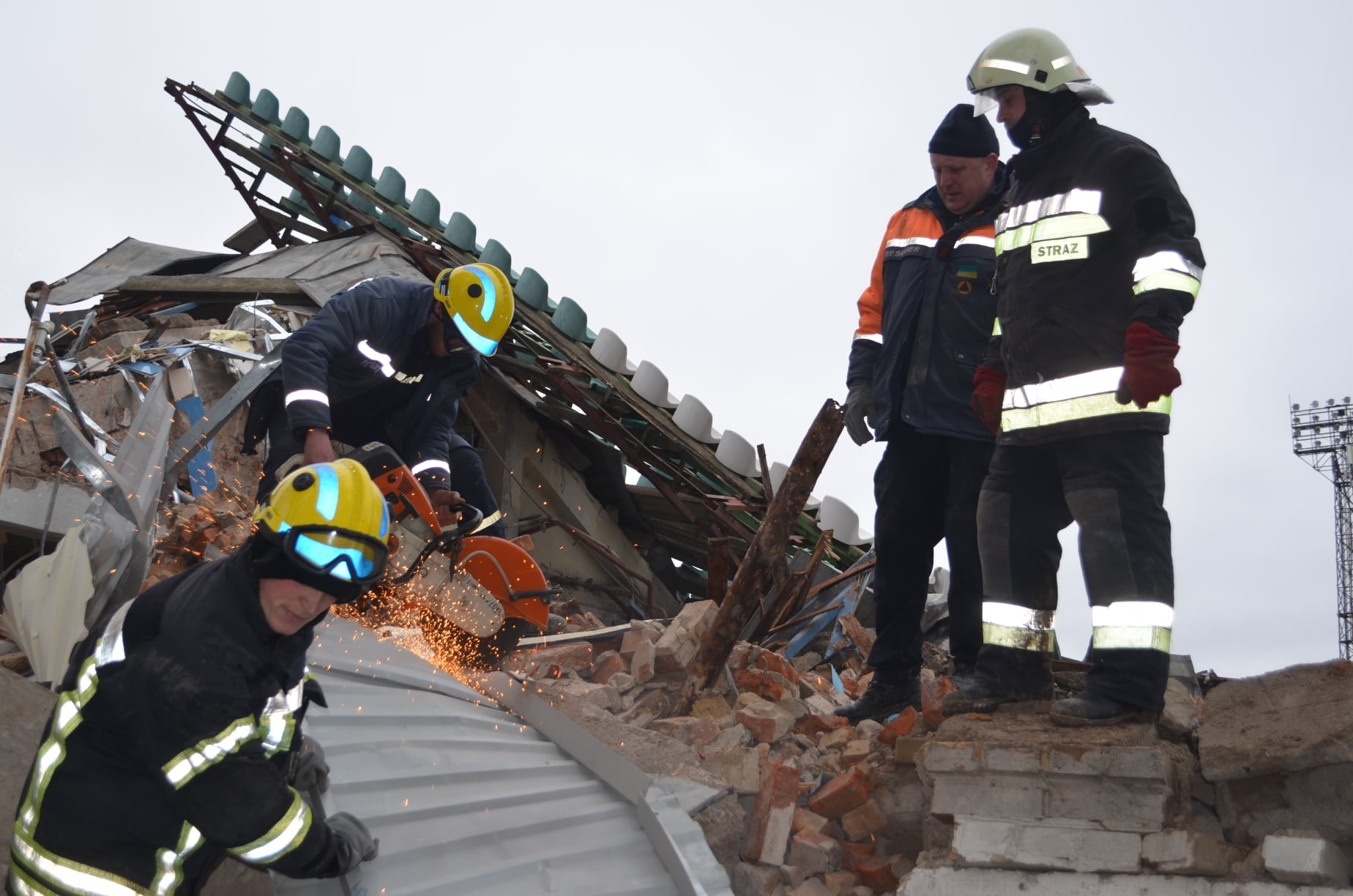

== See also ==
- List of sports venues in Chernihiv
