= FC Krystal Parkhomivka =

Football Club

FC Krystal Parkhomivka was a Ukrainian football club from Parkhomivka, Krasnokutsk Raion (today Bohodukhiv Raion), Kharkiv Oblast. The local sugar factory established the club in 1995.

Representing the village of Parkhomivka, near Krasnokutsk, the team debuted in the national football competition in 1995, during the 1995–96 Ukrainian Cup competition. Their first game at this level was played on 1 August 1995, hosting on their home turf in Parkhomivka professional football club Sportinvest Kryvyi Rih. A crowd of 3,000 spectators witnessed Krystal winning the match 1:0, with Popovych scoring the winning goal from a penalty spot in the 75th minute. In the next round, they faced another professional outfit, Yavir Krasnopillia on 15 October 1995. Playing at home once again, Krystal tied the match at 0, but lost it during the after-match penalty kicks 2:4. The game drew a crowd of 4,000 people. The Parkhomivka population did not exceed 3,000 residents.

Next season, Krystal entered the 1996–97 amateur league competitions. Playing in Group 4 against four other teams from the Ukrainian East, Krystal placed the last 5th place, winning 5 out of 16 league matches. Despite placing last, the team managed to upset every of their opponents at least once. One of Krystal's players, Zinchenko, was among the best scorers in the group with 5 goals. The same season, Krystal Parkhomivka entered the 1996–97 Ukrainian Amateur Cup and reached the finals, where it was defeated in two legs by Domobudivnyk Chernihiv (1:1 away and 0:2 at home).

They continued to participate in amateurs during the 1997–98 Ukrainian Football Amateur League, where they placed second in Group 3, playing against 7 other opponents. Krystal finished a point behind the leaders, Kharchovyk Popivka, from Sumy Oblast and four points ahead of Domobudivnyk Chernihiv. They qualified for the final tournament. Playing in Halych, Krystal placed third, defeating Promin Sambir and Shakhtar Horlivka, while tying with their group leader, Dalis Komyshuvakha. Such performance earned them a place in the promotional play-off to the 1998–99 Ukrainian Second League, but they forfeited that opportunity.

In the 1998–99 Ukrainian Football Amateur League, Krystal, playing in Group 3, tied for first place with Arsenal Kharkiv and yielded on head-to-head criteria. Out of 10 participants in the group, only 4 finished the stage. Nonetheless, both Arsenal and Krystal qualified for the final tournament in Lutsk. During the final tournament, the Parkhomivka team won one of two groups, but lost the final game against the winner of the other group, Dynamo Lviv, placing 2nd overall. Krystal was less fortunate in the 1998–99 Ukrainian Amateur Cup, being eliminated in the first round by Druzhba Mahdalynivka in a two-legged playoff, 1:0 and 0:2.

In 1999, the team placed first in their group of six, six points ahead of the second-placed Frunzenets-Liha-99 and qualified for another final tournament, which was held in Illichivsk, Odesa Oblast. In the group stage of the finals, Krystal placed second behind Tekhno-Tsentr and played for third place against Frunzenets-Liha-99, which finished second in the other group. They routed the Sumy team 3:0. Earning the promotion opportunity, Krystal Parkhomivka decided to remain at amateur level. In the 1999 Ukrainian Amateur Cup, Krystal were eliminated in the first round by HPZ Varva in a two-legged playoff, 0:0 and 0:2.

The 2000 season became the last one for Krystal. The club did not enter the league competitions, but competed in the 2000 Ukrainian Amateur Cup. Unlike previous tries, where Krystal was eliminated in early stages, entering the competition at the Round of 32, they defeated Dynamo Stakhanov, Kolos Bobrovytsia, and Monolit Kostiantynivka before facing their last-year opponents, HPZ Varva, in the semifinals. This time, the Parkhomivka team outperformed opponents in a two-legged playoff by winning 3:1 in an away game and tying at 0 on home turf. In the finals, Krystal faced off with FC Luzhany. On 8 October 2000, Luzhany, at their home stadium, routed Krystal 5:1 with Volodymyr Borysevych scoring a hat-trick. The game in Parkhomivka on 15 October 2000 was even richer in goals. Krystal, after trailing for most of the match, managed to equalize by scoring 2 goals in the last 10 minutes of the game. The game ended in a 4:4 tie, and Krystal yielded an aggregate score of 5 to 9.

== Honors ==
- National Amateur Football Championship:
  - Runners-up (1): 1998-99
- Ukrainian Amateur Cup
  - Runners-up (2): 1996–97, 2000
- Football Championship of Kharkiv Oblast
  - Winners (3): 1998, 1999, 2000
- Football Cup of Kharkiv Oblast
  - Winners (5): 1995, 1996, 1998, 1999, 2000
