= 1996–97 Ukrainian Amateur Cup =

Tournament details
- Country: Ukraine
- Teams: 18

Final positions
- Champions: Domobudivnyk Chernihiv (1st title)
- Runners-up: Krystal Parkhomivka
- Ukrainian Cup qualifier(s): Domobudivnyk Chernihiv

Tournament statistics
- Matches played: 32
- Goals scored: 72 (2.25 per match)

The 1996–97 Ukrainian Amateur Cup was the inaugural annual season of Ukraine's football knockout competition for amateur football teams. The competition started on 29 September 1996 and concluded on 8 June 1997.

The creation of the tournament was part of the 1996 Ukrainian Cup reform which restricted participation of clubs that are not part of the Professional Football League of Ukraine (created earlier in May of 1996) such as those representing regions. After this reform only winners of the Ukrainian Amateur Cup were allowed to compete in the Ukrainian Cup in the following season considering that they remain at non-professional status.

The tournament winner FC Domobudivnyk Chernihiv qualified for the 1997–98 Ukrainian Cup.

== Participated clubs ==
In bold are clubs that are active at the same season AAFU championship (parallel round-robin competition).

- Chernihiv Oblast (1): Domobudivnyk Chernihiv
- Chernivtsi Oblast (1): Kolos Luzhany
- Donetsk Oblast (1): **Silur-Trubnyk Khartsyzk**
- Dnipropetrovsk Oblast (1): Druzhba-Elevator Mahdalynivka
- Ivano-Frankivsk Oblast (1): Probiy Horodenka
- Kharkiv Oblast (1): **Krystal Parkhomivka**
- Khmelnytskyi Oblast (1): Advis Khmelnytskyi
- Kyiv Oblast (1): Refryzherator Fastiv
- Kyiv (1): Interkas
- Kirovohrad Oblast (1): Burevisnyk Kirovohrad
- Lviv Oblast (1): Budivelnyk Pustomyty
- Mykolaiv Oblast (1): Hidroliznyk Olshanske
- Odesa Oblast (1): Monolit Illichivsk
- Sumy Oblast (1): **Slovyanets Konotop**
- Ternopil Oblast (1): Nyva Terebovlya
- Volyn Oblast (1): **Dynamo Manevychi**
- Zakarpattia Oblast (1): Vyzhybu Berehove
- Zhytomyr Oblast (1): Zvyahel-93 Novohrad-Volynskyi

Notes

- Teams that previously competed at the 1995–96 Ukrainian Cup: Druzhba-Elevator Mahdalynivka, Burevisnyk Kirovohrad, Krystal Parkhomivka, Nyva Terebovlya.
- Eight regions did not provide any teams for the tournament, among which were Crimea and the oblasts of Cherkasy, Kherson, Luhansk, Poltava, Rivne, Vinnytsia, and Zaporizhia.

== Bracket ==
The following is the bracket which demonstrates the last four rounds of the Ukrainian Cup including the final match. Numbers in parentheses next to the match score represent the results of a penalty shoot-out.

Round of 16
Vyzhybu Berehove	1	0	1
Probiy Horodenka	0	2	2
Interkas Kyiv	3	2	5
Dynamo Manevychi	1	1	2
Nyva Terebovlia	4	2	6
Budivelnyk Pustomyty	3	1	4
Hidroliznyk Olshanske	1	3	4
Monolit Illichivsk	1	0	1
Silur-Trubnyk Khartsyzk	1	3	4
Burevisnyk-Elbrus Kirovohrad	0	2	2

Quarter-finals
Interkas Kyiv	2	1	3
Probiy Horodenka	1	1	2
Domobudivnyk Chernihiv	1	1	2
Nyva Terebovlia	0	1	1
Druzhba-Elevator Mahdalynivka	2	0	2
Hidroliznyk Olshanske	0	1	1
Krystal Parkhomivka (a)	0	2	2
Silur-Dynamo Khartsyzk	1	1	2

Semi-finals
Interkas Kyiv	0	1	1
Domobudivnyk Chernihiv	0	3	3
Krystal Parkhomivka (a)	1	1	2
Druzhba-Elevator Mahdalynivka	0	2	2

Final
Domobudivnyk Chernihiv	1	2	3
Krystal Parkhomivka	1	0	1

== Competition schedule ==
=== First round ===
Team 1	Agg.	Team 2	1st leg	2nd leg
Kolos Luzhany	–/+	Vyzhybu Berehove	1:1	–/+
Zvyahel-93 Novohrad-Volynskyi	1–4	Interkas Kyiv	0–0	1–4
Advis-Khutrovyk Khmelnytskyi	–/+	Nyva Terebovlia	0–0	–/+
Slovyanets Konotop	2–2 (a)	Krystal Parkhomivka	2–2	0–0
Refryzherator Fastiv	1–2	Domobudivnyk Chernihiv	0–1	1–1

Notes:

- Byes: Budivelnyk Pustomyty, Burevisnyk-Elbrus Kirovohrad, Druzhba-Elevator Mahdalynivka, Dynamo Manevychi, Hidroliznyk Olshanske, Monolit Illichivsk, Probiy Horodenka, Silur-Trubnyk Khartsyzk

=== Round of 16 ===
Team 1	Agg.	Team 2	1st leg	2nd leg
FC Vyzhybu Berehove	1–2	FC Probiy Horodenka	1–0	0–2
FC Interkas Kyiv	5–2	FC Dynamo Manevychi	3–1	2–1
FC Hidroliznyk Olshanske	4–1	FC Monolit Illichivsk	1–1	3–0
FC Nyva Terebovlia	6–4	FC Budivelnyk Pustomyty	4–3	2–1
FC Silur-Trubnyk Khartsyzk	4–2	FC Burevisnyk-Elbrus Kirovohrad	1–0	3–2
Druzhba-Elevator Mahdalynivka	bye			
Domobudivnyk Chernihiv	bye			
Krystal Parkhomivka	bye			

=== Quarterfinals (1/4) ===
Team 1	Agg.	Team 2	1st leg	2nd leg
FC Interkas Kyiv	3–2	FC Probiy Horodenka	2–1	1–1
FC Domobudivnyk Chernihiv	2–1	FC Nyva Terebovlya	1–0	1–1
FC Druzhba-Elevator Mahdalynivka	2–1	FC Hidrolyznyk Olshanske	2–0	0–1
FC Krystal Parkhomivka	(a) 2–2	FC Silur-Dynamo Khartsyzk	0–1	2–1

=== Semifinals (1/2) ===
Team 1	Agg.	Team 2	1st leg	2nd leg
FC Krystal Parkhomivka	(a) 2–2	FC Druzhba-Elevator Mahdalynivka	1–0	1–2
FC Interkas Kyiv	1–3	FC Domobudivnyk Chernihiv	0–0	1–3

=== Final ===
Team 1	Agg.	Team 2	1st leg	2nd leg
FC Domobudivnyk Chernihiv	3–1	FC Krystal Parkhomivka	1–1	2–0

Winner of the 1996–97 Ukrainian Football Cup among amateur teams
Domobudivnyk Chernihiv (Chernihiv Oblast); 1st time

== Final standings ==
R	Team	O	P	W	D	L	GF	GA	GD	Pts.
1	Domobudivnyk	Chernihiv	8	4	4	0	10	4	+6	16
2	Krystal	Kharkiv	8	2	3	3	7	9	-2	9
Eliminated in the semi-finals
3	Interkas	Kyiv	8	4	3	1	13	8	+5	15
4	Druzhba-Elevator	Dnipropetrovsk	4	2	0	2	4	3	+1	6
Eliminated in the quarter-finals
5	Nyva	Ternopil	6	3	2	1	7	6	+1	11
6	Silur-Dynamo	Donetsk	4	3	0	1	6	4	+2	9
7	Hidroliznyk	Mykolaiv	4	2	1	1	5	3	+2	7
8	Probiy	Ivano-Frankivsk	4	1	1	2	4	4	+0	4
Eliminated in the second preliminary round
9	Vyzhybu	Zakarpattia	4	2	1	1	2	3	+1	7
10	Monolit	Odesa	2	0	1	1	1	4	-3	1
11	Budivelnyk	Lviv	2	0	0	2	4	6	-2	0
12	Burevisnyk-Elbrus	Kirovohrad	2	0	0	2	2	4	−2	0
13	Dynamo	Volyn	2	0	0	2	2	5	-3	0
Eliminated in the first preliminary round
14	Slovianets	Sumy	2	0	2	0	2	2	+0	2
15	Refryzherator	Kyiv	2	0	1	1	1	2	-1	1
16	Zviahel-93	Zhytomyr	2	0	1	1	1	4	−3	1
withdrew
17	Advis-Khutrovyk	Khmelnytskyi	2	0	1	1	0	0	+0	1
18	Kolos	Chernivtsi	2	0	1	1	1	1	+0	1

== See also ==
- 1996–97 Ukrainian Football Amateur League
- 1996–97 Ukrainian Cup
