= 2000 Ukrainian Amateur Cup =

2000 Ukrainian Cup among amateurs
Tournament details
- Country: Ukraine

Final positions
- Champions: FC Luzhany
- Runners-up: Krystal Parkhomivka

The 2000 Ukrainian Amateur Cup was the fifth annual season of Ukraine's football knockout competition for amateur football teams. The competition started on 2 July 2000 and concluded on 15 October 2000.

The cup holders FC Shakhta Ukraina Ukrainsk did not enter.

== Participated clubs ==
In bold are clubs that are active at the same season AAFU championship (parallel round-robin competition).

- Cherkasy Oblast (1): **Kolos Chornobai**
- Chernihiv Oblast (2): **HPZ Varva**, Kolos Bobrovytsia
- Chernivtsi Oblast (1): FC Luzhany
- Donetsk Oblast (1): **Monolit Kostiantynivka**
- Kharkiv Oblast (1): Krystal Parkhomivka
- Khmelnytskyi Oblast (1): Tovtry Chemerivtsi
- Kirovohrad Oblast (1): Ikar-MAKBO-94 Kirovohrad
- Kyiv (1): **Dnipro Kyiv**
- Kyiv Oblast (1): Borysfen-2 Shchaslyve
- Luhansk Oblast (1): Dyanmo Stakhanov
- Lviv Oblast (1): Sokil Zolochiv
- Volyn Oblast (1): Yavir Tsuman
- Zakarpattia Oblast (1): SC Perechyn
- Zhytomyr Oblast (1): FC Berdychiv

Notes

- Twelve regions did not provide any teams for the tournament, among which were Crimea, the oblasts of Dnipropetrovsk, Ivano-Frankivsk, Kherson, Mykolaiv, Odesa, Poltava, Rivne, Sumy, Ternopil, Vinnytsia, and Zaporizhia.

== Bracket ==
The following is the bracket that demonstrates the last four rounds of the Ukrainian Cup, including the final match. Numbers in parentheses next to the match score represent the results of a penalty shoot-out.

Round of 16
Kolos Bobrovytsia	1	-	-
**Krystal Parkhomivka**	**3**	+	+
Borysfen-2 Shchaslyve	0	-	-
**Dnipro Kyiv**	**1**	+	+
**FC Berdychiv** (a)	**2**	1	3
Tovtry Chemerivtsi	0	**3**	3
Sokil Zolochiv	**3**	0	3
**SC Perechyn** (a)	1	**2**	3

Quarter-finals
Ikar-MAKBO-94 Kirovohrad	0	-	-
**HPZ Varva**	**2**	+	+
Monolit Kostiantynivka	0	-	-
**Krystal Parkhomivka**	**3**	+	+
FC Berdychiv	**2**	1	3
**Dnipro Kyiv**	1	**3**	**4**
SC Perechyn	**1**	0	1 (5)
**FC Luzhany**	0	**1**	**1 (6)**

Semi-finals
HPZ Varva	1	0	1
**Krystal Parkhomivka**	**3**	0	**3**
**FC Luzhany**	0	**1**	**1**
Dnipro Kyiv	0	0	0

Final
**FC Luzhany**	**5**	4	**9**
Krystal Parkhomivka	1	4	5

== Competition schedule ==
=== First round ===
Team 1	Agg.	Team 2	1st leg	2nd leg
**FC Berdychiv**	w/o	Yavir Tsuman	—	—
**Kolos Bobrovytsia**	w/o	Kolos Chornobai	—	—
Dynamo Stakhanov	0–3	**Krystal Parkhomivka**	0–3	0–0

=== Second round ===
Team 1	Agg.	Team 2	1st leg	2nd leg
Sokil Zolochiv	3–3 (a)	**SC Perechyn**	3–1	0–2
Kolos Bobrovytsia	w/o	**Krystal Parkhomivka**	1–3	w/o
Borysfen-2 Shchaslyve	w/o	**Dnipro Kyiv**	0–1	w/o
**FC Berdychiv**	3–3 (a)	Tovtry Chemerivtsi	2–0	1–3

=== Quarterfinals (1/4) ===
Team 1	Agg.	Team 2	1st leg	2nd leg
Ikar-MAKBO-94 Kirovohrad	w/o	**HPZ Varva**	0–2	w/o
SC Perechyn	1–1 (5–6 p)	**FC Luzhany**	1–0	0–1 (a.e.t.)
FC Berdychiv	3–4	**Dnipro Kyiv**	2–1	1–3
Monolit Kostiantynivka	w/o	**Krystal Parkhomivka**	0–3	w/o

=== Semifinals (1/2) ===
Team 1	Agg.	Team 2	1st leg	2nd leg
**FC Luzhany**	1–0	Dnipro Kyiv	0–0	1–0
HPZ Varva	1–3	**Krystal Parkhomivka**	1–3	0–0

=== Final ===
Team 1	Agg.	Team 2	1st leg	2nd leg
**FC Luzhany**	9–5	Krystal Parkhomivka	5–1	4–4

Winner of the 2000 Ukrainian Football Cup among amateur teams
**FC Luzhany (Chernivtsi Oblast)**; **1st time**

== See also ==
- 2000 Ukrainian Football Amateur League
- 2000–01 Ukrainian Cup
- 2000–01 Ukrainian Second League Cup
