= FC Luzhany =

Ukrainian football club

FC Luzhany (Ukrainian: ФК «Лужани») is a Ukrainian amateur football club from Luzhany, Chernivtsi Oblast.

== Brief overview ==
FC Luzhany is a successor of some other Luzhany football teams that existed at least since after World War II in 1947 as Kolhospnyk Luzhany.

It was not until 1975 when Kolos Luzhany became a champion of Chernivtsi Oblast.

Since 2000s the Luzhany football team for quite some time competed at Ukrainian national championship and Ukrainian Cup competition among amateur teams.

Luzhany became better known in 2008 when a coach of Bukovyna Chernivtsi football academy Yuriy Kraft had led the team to championship title among amateur teams. Following this success, FC Luzhany obtained an opportunity to compete at the Ukrainian Second League and UEFA Regions' Cup.

Due to renovations of a stadium in Luzhany, in 2008 FC Luzhany played its games at Malva Stadium in Chernivtsi.

Among the most notable players of the club are Ruslan Hunchak who became a top scorer of the 2010-11 Ukrainian First League and Vadym Zayats who soon after he retired in 2010-2013 was a head coach of FC Bukovyna Chernivtsi.

== Honours ==
- Ukrainian Championship (1): 2008
- Ukrainian Cup (1): 2000
- Chernivtsi Oblast (6): 1975, 2000, 2002, 2004, 2005, 2008

== People ==
=== Coaches ===
- Yuriy Kraft

=== Presidents ===
- Vasyl Orletskyi
- Yaroslav Mazur
