= 2003–04 FC Kremin Kremenchuk season =

1st season in existence of Kremin FC

Kremin
2003–04 season
- Owner: Kremenchuk City
- Director: Dmytro Oleksiienko
- Head coach: Serhii Svystun
- Stadium: Polytechnic
- Football Championship of Poltava Oblast: 1st
- Ukrainian Amateur League: 4th Group 6
- Poltava Oblast Cup: Winners
- Top goalscorer: League: Oleksandr Solnyshkin (11); All: Oleksandr Solnyshkin (20)
- Highest home attendance: 750 (v. Lubny, 17 August 2003)
- Lowest home attendance: 150 (v. Pyriatyn, 10 April 2004) (v. DYuFSh Vorskla Poltava, 21 April 2004)
- Average home league attendance: 400
- Biggest win: 13–0 vs Pyriatyn (H), 10 April 2004, First League
- Biggest defeat: 0–2 vs FC ZemliaK Myrhorod (H), 18 October 2003, First League

The 2003–04 season was Kremin's 1st year in existence since clubs revival in 2003 and their first season in the Football Championship of Poltava Oblast, since the win in 1962 as Dnipro. Managed by Serhii Svystun, Kremin won the championship and the Poltava Oblast Cup. They also participated in the Ukrainian Amateur League where they finished bottom of their group. The season covers the period from 17 April 2003 to 1 July 2004.

== Season summary ==
=== Pre-season ===
On 17 April 2003 Oleksandr Mazur chairman of the sports committee and Peter Skrylnyk Chairman of the Football Federation announced that a meeting with Mykola Hlukhov Kremenchuk mayor took place. The mayor ordered his team to form a municipal team that in 2004 would begin playing in Ukrainian Second League. Kremenchuk City Council planned to cover half of the expanses with the other half being provided by various city enterprises. Team was formed and began playing in second half of July. Serhii Svystun was appointed manager with Leonid Dyndikov as his assistant. Former player Andrii Nediak was appointed as an administrator. Former Kremin and Adoms players made up majority of the team. They were reinforced by Kremenchuk City Championship players from local team Atlant. Kredmash Stadium was selected as a training ground and Polytechnic Stadium was chosen for home matches. On 5 August 2003 Kremin lost 2–1 to Vorskla-2 Poltava during a friendly match organized as a trial for potential players.

=== August ===
On 17 August first match of the 2003–04 Football Championship of Poltava Oblast began, with Kremin hosting Lubny. Match between newly recreated teams ended in a goalless draw. A week later Kremin traveled to Velyka Krucha to face Pyriatyn. Hosts scored first seventeen minutes into the first half. It took Kremin sixteen minutes to come back through Oleh Horyslavets. With one minute remaining in the first half Pyriatyn captain Yurii Irodovskyi scored an own goal after a shot from Oleh Halata. Visitors took control of the match and scored twice after the break to give Kremin its first win. On 30 August Kremin traveled to Reshetylivka to face Vorskla youth football school team. Kremin scored first through Ruslan Roztorhuiev in the seventeenth minute. Thirteen minutes later visitors doubled their lead through Vasyl Kryvoruchko. With one minute remaining before the break Vitalii Havrenkov scored third goal for Kremin. Yevhenii Rozka scored another goal ten minutes after the restart. Oleksandr Myslavskyi scored the teams first hat-trick in under twelve minutes. His first goal came in the seventy-fourth minute. Second was scored less than a minute later, and third ten minutes later.

=== September ===
7 September match against Naftovyk-Psel Hadiach was postponed due to Kremin junior team participation in national competition. Instead a home friendly was played against Vorskla Poltava. Almost fifteen hundred people came to watch the match. Vorskla opened the score through Serhii Motuz in the thirty-fourth minute. Two minutes later visitors doubled their lead through Lucky Idahor. Kremin pulled one back through Ruslan Roztorhuiev with one minute remaining in first half. Visitors scored the last goal in the game, twelve minutes after restart. A week later Kremin faced PZMS in Poltava. Match ended in a 1–0 loss through a goal from Igor Kislov. On 24 September Kremin hosted league leaders Molod-PedUniversytet. Vitalii Havrenkov gave Kremin the lead in the forty-fourth minute. Serhii Shvets scored an own goal to give Kremin a 2–0 win. Kremin finished the month with a huge 12–0 win against Hazovyk Mashivka in first leg of 1/8 of Poltava Oblast Cup.

=== October ===
On 5 October Kremin faced Hazovyk Mashivka in return leg of 1/8 of Poltava Oblast Cup. This time Kremin won 3–0. On 12 October Kremin traveled to Hrebinka to face Locomotyv. Kremin won 3–1. Yurii Kuchuk scored in the twentieth minute to give hosts the lead. Kremin equalized through Ruslan Roztorhuiev eighteen minutes later. Five minutes after the break Oleksandr Solnyshkin gave Kremin the lead. In the sixty-second minute Roztorhuiev scored his second goal of the game. On 18 October Kremin hosted defending champions FC ZemliaK Myrhorod. Match ended in a 2–0 loss. Oleksandr Ovdiienko scored seventeen minutes into the match. Five minutes later Oleh Blokhin doubled the visitors lead. Kremin had a chance to equalize when they were awarded a penalty kick. Anton Dyndikov missed goal and a chance to bring his side back into the game. Kremin finished first half of championship with a 3–0 home win against Psel Hadiach. With the first attack Oleksandr Myslavskyi gave Kremin the lead in the second minute. It took until the eighty-first minute to double the lead through Yevhenii Rozka. Kostiantyn Khyzhniak scored the games third goal. Kremenchuk City council officially registered Municipal Football Club Kremin on 23 October. Kremin was drawn with another team from Kremenchuk in the quarterfinal of the Poltava Oblast Cup. First leg was played on 29 October and finished with a 2–0 win for Kremin. Kostiantyn Khyzhniak and Vitalii Havrenkov were the goalscorers.

=== November ===
Return leg for the cup quarterfinal was played on 7 November. Kremin scored first in the nineteenth minute through Oleksandr Myslavskyi. He scored again in the sixty-first minute before Oleh Spitsyn converted the penalty kick to score first goal for Hirnyk. Oleksandr Chernyshov and Vasyl Kryvoruchko scored within three minutes to give Kremin a convincing 6–1 aggregate win. After Kremin was officially resisted as a municipal club Dmytro Oleksiienko was appointed as a club director. Beginning from 2004 finances to run the club would come from the city budget. Club leadership set goals to win the championship and cup.

=== March ===
In preparation for the spring part of season Kremin played a number of friendly matches. Kremin drew 3–3 with FC Oleksandriya in Oleksandriia, won 3–0 against Ikar from Kirovohrad and drew with Elektron Romny.

=== April ===
On 10 April second half of Poltava Oblast championship began. Kremin hosted Pyriatyn. This game finished 13–0 and was the biggest win ever by the club. Oleksandr Myronenko, Vitalii Havrenkov, Oleh Horyslavets and Serhii Zub each scored one goal, Oleksandr Myslavskyi, Roman Semuka, Vasyl Kryvoruchko each scored twice. Oleksandr Solnyshkin scored a hat-trick. Four days later Kremin played away in Myrhorod. Match with ZemliaK ended in a 1–1 draw. Oleksandr Solnyshkin failed to convert his penalty kick in the twentieth minute. Kremin took the lead three minutes into the second half through Serhii Vynnyk. Seven minutes later they conceded a goal from Oleksandr Tsybulko and were unable to find the winner. This result meant the Kremin was third before facing the league leaders on Sunday. Match against leaders PZMS was played at home. Kremin had an early opportunity to take the lead when Anton Dyndikov had a chance to score a penalty kick. Oleksandr Solnyshkin was the first to reach the ball after the penalty kick and give his team the lead in the tenth minute. He doubled the lead in the thirty-sixth and scored his third goal six minutes into the second half. On 21 April Kremin hosted Vorskla youth football school team. Match ended in a 7–0 win for Kremin. Oleksandr Yankovskyi scored the opening goal in the sixth minute. Oleksandr Solnyshkin doubled the lead from the penalty spot with five minutes remaining in the first half. Oleh Horyslavets, Yevhenii Rozka, Andrii Rusantsev all scored in the second half and Vasyl Kryvoruchko scored two.

=== May ===
2 May match against Lokomotyv did not happen as Locomotyv withdrew from competition. Kremin like all other teams was awarded a walkover. On 5 May Kremin took part in first match of the 2004 Ukrainian Football Amateur League. They were drawn into group 6. First match was a 2–1 win against Metalurh Komsomolske. Serhii Zavialov scored in the third minute, however the visitors equalized four minutes later. Andrii Rusantsev scored in the eighty-fourth minute to give Kremin its first victory in the competition. During the next match in Amateur league Dnipro scored twice in the first half. However due to a great game from Hirnyk Kryvyi Rih leader Yevhenii Rymshyn who scored twice, Hirnyk was able to draw the game. On 19 May Kremin returned to Poltava Oblast Championship where they played with one of the leaders Lubny. Roman Semuka with his fifty-eight minute penalty kick gave Kremin much win and took away all hope from Lubny. On the 26th Kremin lost 1–0 to Real Odesa in the third match of Amateur league. Four days later Kremin won a very difficult 1–0 victory against Psel Hadiach in the first leg of semi-finals of the cup.

=== June ===
On 2 June Kremin played a goalless draw with Metalurh Komsomolske in Amateur league. Kremin players playing only part time could not train as was required and had a low level of physical condition. Away matches did not feature all players. A week later Kremin played Molod-PedUniversytet in Dykanka. All five of Kremin's goals were scored in the second half. Oleksandr Solnyshkin was the first to score in the fifty-eights minute, followed by a goal from Serhii Zavialov two minutes later. Oleksandr Myslavskyi scored eight minutes later. In the seventy-first Zavialov scored another and nine minutes later Solnyshkin also scored his second goal in the game. On 13 June Kremin played its last game in the league against Psel Hadiach. Roman Semuka gave Kremin the lead in the twenty-fifth minute. In the sixty-first minute Oleksandr Solnyshkin doubled that lead. Seven minutes later Artem Stryzhak scored the third goal. In the seventy-ninth minute Psel player Oleh Nehrieiev pulled one back for the hosts. In the last minute Vasyl Kryvoruchko scored the last goal in the league for Kremin. With this win Kremin was crowned champions of the 2003–04 Football Championship of Poltava Oblast. Three days later Kremin played in a 3–2 loss to Hirnyk Kryvyi Rih in Amateur league. Hirnyk took an early lead through Serhii Storozhev. Oleksandr Solnyshkin was able to find the equalizer in the thirty-third minute. Hirnyk again took the lead with one minute remaining in the first half. Dmytro Holovko equalized in the sixty-second minute. However the hosts took the lead for the third time with thirteen minutes remaining. On 20 June Kremin hosted Psel Hadiach in the second match of the Poltava Oblast Cup semifinal. Serhii Zavialov gave Kremin the lead in the fourteenth minute. Oleksandr Myslavskyi doubled the lead in the twenty-ninth minute. Oleksandr Solnyshkin scored a hat-trick in the second half to give Kremin a 6–0 aggregate win. Three days later Kremin played the last game in Amateur league. Kremin lost 2–1 in a home game to Real Odesa. The visitors scored first in the twenty-first minute and Oleksandr Myslavskyi equalized five minutes later. Visitors scored again in the seventieth minute. Kremin finished last in the group. On 27 June Cup final was played in Poltava. Kremin kept FC ZemliaK Myrhorod in their half for good part of the game. A defensive mistake allowed Serhii Zavialov to give Kremin the lead in sixty-eight minute. Oleksandr Solnyshkin doubled the lead in the eighty-second minute to win Kremin the Cup. After winning the Poltava Oblast Championship and Cup the team was still unprepared for the Second League. It was decided that the team would remain in the Championship for another year. The team still did not own a team bus, most players worked in factories and only played football in their free time.

== Management team ==
Position	Name	Year appointed	Last club/team	References
Manager	(Ukraine) Serhii Svystun	July 2003	(Ukraine) Atlant Kremenchuk	
Coach	(Ukraine) Leonid Dyndikov	July 2003		
Nachalnik Komandy/Administrator	(Ukraine) Andrii Nediak	July 2003		
Director	(Ukraine) Dmytro Oleksiienko	23 October 2003		

== Pre-season and friendlies ==
Win Draw Loss Fixtures

Results list Kremin's goal tally first.

Date	Opponent	Venue	Result	Kremin scorers	Referee
5 August 2003	Vorskla-2 Poltava		1–2	Unknown goalscorer	
7 September 2003 – 15:00	Vorskla Poltava	Home	1–3	Roztorhuiev 44'	
March 2004	Oleksandriia	Away	3–3	Unknown goalscorers	
March 2004	Ikar Kirovohrad		3–0	Unknown goalscorer	
March 2004	Elektron Romny	Away	?–?	Unknown goalscorers	

== Competitions ==
=== Overall record ===
Competition	First match	Last match	Starting round	Final position	Record							
Competition	First match	Last match	Starting round	Final position	Pld	W	D	L	GF	GA	GD	Win %
2003–04 Football Championship of Poltava Oblast	17 August 2003	13 June 2004	Matchday 1	Winners	16	12	2	2	53	7	+46	75.00
Poltava Oblast Cup	28 September 2003	31 October 2004	1/8 Final	Winners	7	7	0	0	29	1	+28	100.00
2004 Ukrainian Football Amateur League	5 May 2004	23 June 2004	Group stage	4th	6	1	2	3	7	9	−2	16.67
Total					29	20	4	5	89	17	+72	68.97

Source: Competitions

=== Championship of Poltava Oblast ===
==== Results summary ====
Overall								Home						Away					
Pld	W	D	L	GF	GA	GD	Pts	W	D	L	GF	GA	GD	W	D	L	GF	GA	GD
16	12	2	2	53	7	+46	38	6	1	1	28	2	+26	6	1	1	25	5	+20

==== League table ====
Pos	Team	Pld	W	D	L	GF	GA	GD	Pts	
1	Kremin Kremenchuk (C)	16	12	2	2	53	7	+46	38	Champion
2	ZemliaK Myrhorod	16	10	5	1	33	11	+22	35	Silver Medals
3	PZMS Poltava	16	10	5	1	27	14	+13	35	Bronze Medals
4	Lubny	16	7	7	2	39	18	+21	28	
5	Psel Hadiach	16	5	2	9	18	32	−14	17	

Source: fcvorskla.com.ua
(C) Champions

==== Matches ====
Win Draw Loss Fixtures

Results list Kremin's goal tally first.

Date	Opponent	Venue	Result	Kremin scorers	Referee	Attendance
17 August 2003 – 16:30	Lubny	Home	0–0		Vasyl Horats	750
24 August 2003 – 16:30	Pyriatyn	Away	4–1	Horyslavets 33', Irodovskyi 44' (o.g.), Myslavskyi 55', Havrenkov 66'	Oleksandr Matiash	300
30 August 2003 – 16:30	DYuFSh Vorskla Poltava	Away	7–0	Roztorhuiev 17', Kryvoruchko 30', Havrenkov 44', Rozka 55', Myslavskyi (3) 74', 75', 85'	Viktor Kharchenko	100
14 September 2003 – 15:00	PZMS Poltava	Away	0–1		Viktor Kharchenko	150
24 September 2003 – 15:00	Molod-PedUniversytet Poltava	Home	2–0	Havrenkov 44', Shvets 67' (o.g.)	Volodymyr Oleksiienko	
12 October 2003 – 15:00	Lokomotyv	Away	3–1	Roztorhuiev (2) 38', 62', Solnyshkin 50'	Volodymyr Oleksiienko	200
18 October 2003 – 14:30	ZemliaK Myrhorod	Home	0–2		Oleksandr Matiash	500
22 October 2003 – 15:00	Psel Hadiach	Home	3–0	Myslavskyi 2', Rozka 81', Khyzhniak 90'	Yurii Levchuk	250
10 April 2004 – 15:00	Pyriatyn	Home	13–0	Solnyshkin (3) 15', 76', 87', Zub 20', Myslavskyi (2) 37', 44', Myronenko 60', Havrenkov 62', Horyslavets 64', Semuka (2) 67', 85', Kryvoruchko (2) 69', 82'	Oleksii Bilichenko	150
14 April 2004 – 15:00	ZemliaK Myrhorod	Away	1–1	Vynnyk 48'	Oleksandr Hornostaiev	
18 April 2004 – 15:00	PZMS Poltava	Home	3–0	Solnyshkin (3) 10', 36', 51'	Oleksandr Korniiko	600
21 April 2004 – 15:00	DYuFSh Vorskla Poltava	Home	7–0	Yankovskyi 6', Solnyshkin 40' (pen.), Horyslavets 49', Rozka 62', Kryvoruchko (2) 70', 71', Rusantsev 85'	Viktor Kharchenko	150
2 May 2004	Lokomotyv	Home	w/o			
19 May 2004 – 15:00	Lubny	Away	1–0	Semuka 58' (pen.)	Oleksandr Hornostaiev	344
9 June 2004 – 17:00	Molod-PedUniversytet Poltava	Away	5–0	Solnyshkin (2) 58', 80', Zavialov 60', 71', Myslavskyi 68'	Viktor Kharchenko	80
13 June 2004 – 17:00	Psel Hadiach	Away	4–1	Semuka 25', Solnyshkin 61', Stryzhak 68', Kryvoruchko 90'	Oleksandr Matiash	

=== Poltava Oblast Cup ===
Win Draw Loss Fixtures

Results list Kremin's goal tally first.

Date	Opponent	Venue	Result	Kremin scorers	Referee	Attendance
28 September 2003 – 14:20	Hazovyk Mashivka	Home	12–0	Dyndikov 11' (pen.), 90', Rozka (2) 14', 67', Horyslavets 26', Vynnyk 39', Solnyshkin (2) 46', 47', Myslavskyi (2) 73', 77', Kryvoruchko (2) 79', 86'	Oleksandr Hornostaiev	200
5 October 2003 – 14:00	Hazovyk Mashivka	Away	3–0	Dyndikov (2) 32', 53', Solnyshkin 81'	Mykola Myhulia	40
29 October 2003 – 14:00	Hirnyk-Metalurh	Home	2–0	Khyzhniak 24', Havrenkov 45'	Anatolii Kharakhalchuk	500
2 November 2003 – 14:00	Hirnyk-Metalurh	Away	4–1	Myslavskyi (2) 19', 61', Chernyshov 81', Kryvoruchko 84'	Pavlo Briukhov	300
30 May 2004 – 15:00	Psel Hadiach	Away	1–0	Solnyshkin 70'	Oksana Yermakova	500
20 June 2004 – 14:00	Psel Hadiach	Home	5–0	Zavialov 14', Myslavskyi 29', Solnyshkin (3) 65', 70', 78' (pen.)	Roman Bukhurynskyi	
27 June 2004 – 14:00	FC ZemliaK Myrhorod	Neutral	2–0	Zavialov 68', Solnyshkin 82'	Ihor Pokydko	150

=== Amateur League ===
==== Results summary ====
Overall								Home						Away					
Pld	W	D	L	GF	GA	GD	Pts	W	D	L	GF	GA	GD	W	D	L	GF	GA	GD
6	1	2	3	7	9	−2	5	0	2	1	3	4	−1	1	0	2	4	5	−1

==== League table ====
Pos	Team	Pld	W	D	L	GF	GA	GD	Pts	Qualification
1	Hirnyk Kryvyi Rih	6	3	1	2	11	11	0	10	
2	Real Odesa	6	3	1	2	6	6	0	10	
3	Metalurh Komsomolske	6	2	2	2	6	4	+2	8	Second Stage
4	Kremin Kremenchuk	6	1	2	3	7	9	−2	5	

==== Group 6 ====
Win Draw Loss Fixtures

Results list Kremin's goal tally first.

Date	Opponent	Venue	Result	Kremin scorers	Referee	Attendance
5 May 2004 – 17:00	Metalurh Komsomolske	Away	2–1	Zavialov 3', Rusantsev 84'	Serhii Hatsenko	200
12 May 2004 – 17:00	Hirnyk Kryvyi Rih	Home	2–2	Havrenkov (2) 5', 38'	Ihor Sobolenko	380
26 May 2004 – 18:00	Real Odesa	Away	0–1		Maksym Chertoplias	150
2 June 2004 – 18:00	Metalurh Komsomolske	Home	0–0		Oleksandr Ochkurenko	500
16 June 2004 – 17:00	Hirnyk Kryvyi Rih	Away	2–3	Solnyshkin 33', Holovko 62'	Andrii Naboichenko	300
23 June 2004 – 18:00	Real Odesa	Home	1–2	Myslavskyi 26'	Artem Nozdrachov	200

== Statistics ==
=== Appearances and goals ===
The plus (+) symbol denotes an appearance as a substitute, hence 2+1 indicates two appearances in the starting XI and one appearance as a substitute.

No.	Pos	Nat	Player	Total		League		Amateur League		Cup	
No.	Pos	Nat	Player	Apps	Goals	Apps	Goals	Apps	Goals	Apps	Goals
1	GK	(Ukraine) UKR	Serhii Prykhozhyi	26	0	15	0	6	0	5	0
	GK	(Ukraine) UKR	Oleksandr Petko	1	0	0	0	0	0	0+1	0
12	GK	(Ukraine) UKR	Andrii Oliinyk	7	0	0+2	0	0+1	0	1+3	0
2	DF	(Ukraine) UKR	Oleh Horyslavets	26	4	15	3	6	0	5	1
3	DF	(Ukraine) UKR	Serhii Vynnyk	27	2	10+5	1	5	0	7	1
4	DF	(Ukraine) UKR	Yevhenii Rozka	26	7	14	5	5	0	7	2
14	DF	(Ukraine) UKR	Oleksandr Myronenko	27	1	13+2	1	5	0	7	0
	DF	(Ukraine) UKR	Serhii Koval	1	0	0	0	0	0	0+1	0
5	MF	(Ukraine) UKR	Artem Stryzhak	24	0	12+1	0	4+1	0	6	0
17	MF	(Ukraine) UKR	Vasyl Kryvoruchko	20	9	6+8	6	0+2	0	1+3	3
7	MF	(Ukraine) UKR	Anton Dyndikov	30	4	13+5	0	5+1	0	5+1	4
6	MF	(Ukraine) UKR	Oleh Halata	26	0	9+5	0	5+1	0	5+1	0
15	MF	(Ukraine) UKR	Serhii Zub	18	1	14	1	2	0	2	0
10	MF	(Ukraine) UKR	Vitalii Havrenkov	22	8	11+1	4	4+1	2	5	2
9	MF	(Ukraine) UKR	Pavel Pashayev	2	0	0+1	0	0	0	1	0
	MF	(Ukraine) UKR	Maksym Pashayev	1	0	0+1	0	-	-	-	-
	MF	(Ukraine) UKR	Oleksandr Chernyshov	15	1	0+5	0	0+4	0	1+5	1
13	MF	(Ukraine) UKR	Oleksandr Yankovskyi	4	1	2+2	1	-	-	-	-
	MF	(Ukraine) UKR	Denys Vakulchuk	1	0	0+1	0	-	-	-	-
	MF	(Ukraine) UKR	Volodymyr Kovalov	4	0	0+2	0	0	0	1+1	0
18(19)	MF	(Ukraine) UKR	Andrii Rusantsev	18	2	0+5	1	0+6	1	2+5	0
	MF	(Ukraine) UKR	Dmytro Holovko	1	1	0	0	1	1	0	0
	MF	(Ukraine) UKR	Viktor Kovalevskyi	1	0	0	0	1	0	-	-
8	FW	(Ukraine) UKR	Oleksandr Solnyshkin	20	20	11	11	4	1	5	8
11	FW	(Ukraine) UKR	Serhii Zavialov	14	5	2+5	2	5	1	2	2
16	FW	(Ukraine) UKR	Oleksandr Myslavskyi	24	14	3+11	8	2+3	1	2+3	5
	FW	(Ukraine) UKR	Ruslan Roztorhuiev	11	3	8	3	0	0	2+1	0
17	FW	(Ukraine) UKR	Maksym Myroshnychenko	3	0	0	0	2+1	0	-	-
9	FW	(Ukraine) UKR	Roman Semuka	12	4	7	4	4+1	0	-	-
	FW	(Ukraine) UKR	Kostiantyn Khyzhniak	10	2	0+6	1	0	0	4	1

== Transfers ==
=== In ===
Date	Pos.	Name	From	Fee
July 2003	MF	(Ukraine) Anton Dyndikov	(Ukraine) Kremez	Undisclosed
July 2003	MF	(Ukraine) Oleh Halata	(Ukraine) Kremez	Undisclosed
July 2003	MF	(Ukraine) Vasyl Kryvoruchko	(Ukraine) Kremez	Undisclosed
July 2003	DF	(Ukraine) Denys Vakulchuk	(Ukraine) Kremez	Undisclosed
July 2003	DF	(Ukraine) Serhii Vynnyk	(Ukraine) Kremez	Undisclosed
July 2003	MF	(Ukraine) Oleksandr Chernyshov	(Ukraine) Atlant Kremenchuk	Undisclosed
July 2003	MF	(Ukraine) Dmytro Holovko	(Ukraine) Atlant Kremenchuk	Undisclosed
July 2003	MF	(Ukraine) Volodymyr Kovalov	(Ukraine) Atlant Kremenchuk	Undisclosed
July 2003	GK	(Ukraine) Andrii Oliinyk	(Ukraine) Atlant Kremenchuk	Undisclosed
July 2003	MF	(Ukraine) Maksym Pashayev	(Ukraine) Atlant Kremenchuk	Undisclosed
July 2003	MF	(Ukraine) Pavel Pashayev	(Ukraine) Atlant Kremenchuk	Undisclosed
July 2003	MF	(Ukraine) Andrii Rusantsev	(Ukraine) Atlant Kremenchuk	Undisclosed
July 2003	MF	(Ukraine) Artem Stryzhak	(Ukraine) Atlant Kremenchuk	Undisclosed
July 2003	MF	(Ukraine) Dmytro Holovko	(Ukraine) Kremenchukmiaso	Undisclosed
July 2003	GK	(Ukraine) Serhii Prykhozhyi	(Ukraine) Kremenchukmiaso	Undisclosed
July 2003	MF	(Ukraine) Volodymyr Kovalov	(Ukraine) Hirnyk-Sport Komsomolsk	Undisclosed
July 2003	FW	(Ukraine) Oleksandr Myslavskyi	(Ukraine) Hirnyk-Sport Komsomolsk	Undisclosed
July 2003	FW	(Ukraine) Oleksandr Solnyshkin	(Ukraine) Hirnyk-Sport Komsomolsk	Undisclosed
July 2003	DF	(Ukraine) Oleh Horyslavets	(Russia) Sokol Saratov	Undisclosed
July 2003	FW	(Ukraine) Kostiantyn Khyzhniak	(Ukraine) Palmira Odesa	Undisclosed
July 2003	FW	(Ukraine) Maksym Myroshnychenko	(Kazakhstan) Ordabasy	Undisclosed
July 2003	FW	(Ukraine) Ruslan Roztorhuiev	(Czech Republic) Český Brod	Undisclosed
July 2003	FW	(Ukraine) Roman Semuka	(Ukraine) Uholiok Myrnohrad	Undisclosed
July 2003	MF	(Ukraine) Oleksandr Yankovskyi	(Ukraine) Zirka Kirovohrad	Undisclosed
July 2003	FW	(Ukraine) Serhii Zavialov	(Ukraine) Ikar-MAKBO Kirovohrad	Undisclosed
July 2003	MF	(Ukraine) Serhii Zub	(Ukraine) Vorskla-2 Poltava	Undisclosed
July 2003	DF	(Ukraine) Oleksandr Myronenko	Unknown	Undisclosed
July 2003	DF	(Ukraine) Yevhenii Rozka	Unknown	Undisclosed

== Sources ==
- Pyrukhin, Yurii (n.d.), МФК "Кремень" Кременчуг 2003-2005 [MFC "Kremin" Kremenchuk 2003-2005] (in Russian), Kremenchuk
- Lomov, Anatolii; Stadnychenko, Oleksandr (2009), 100 Років Полтавському Футболу [100 Years of Poltava Football] (in Ukrainian), Poltava: Poltava, ISBN 978-966-97035-0-7
- Lomov, Anatolii; Kryvorotko, Serhii (2010), Энциклопедия Полтавского Футбола (1909-2010) [Encyclopedia of Poltava Football (1909-2010)] (in Russian), Poltava: OOO "ASMI", ISBN 978-966-182-118-6
- Klykovskyi, Serhii (2010), Лубенському футболу 90 років [90 Years of Football in Lubny] (in Ukrainian), Lubny
- Lander, Yurii (2008), Футбол в Украине 2007-2008 статистический ежигодник выпуск 17 [Football in Ukraine 2007-2008 statistical yearbook issue 17] (in Russian)
