= 2005–06 FC Kremin Kremenchuk season =

Kremin
2005–06 season
- President: Oleh Babaev
- Head coach: Serhiy Svystun
- Second League Group C: 9th
- Ukrainian Cup: Preliminary round

The 2005–06 season was FC Kremin Kremenchuk's 3rd overall and 1st consecutive season in the Second League.

== Team kit ==
The team kits are produced by Puma AG and the shirt sponsor is KremenchukMiaso «Кременчукм’ясо». The home and away kit was retained from previous seasons.

Home	Away

== Statistics ==
=== Top scorers ===
Includes all competitive matches. The list is sorted by shirt number when total goals are equal.

Position	Number	Name	Second League	Cup	Total
1		Kykot	4	0	1
2		Pryma	3	0	3
2		Rusantsev	3	0	3
2		Semuka	3 (2)	0	3
5		Kozliuk	2	0	2
5		Larionov	2	0	2
7		Slipchenko	1	0	1
7		Lysytskyi	0	1	1
7		Myronenko	1	0	1
7		Horyslavets	1	0	1
7		Rozka	1	0	1
/	/	/	21	1	22
1		Mironov	1	0	1
1		Myronenko	1	0	1
/	/	Own Goals	2	0	2
		TOTALS	23	1	24

Last updated on 20 October 2009

=== Disciplinary record ===
N	Pos.	Nat.	Name	Yellow card	Second yellow card	Red card	Notes
		(Ukraine)	Mironov]	1	0	0	
		(Ukraine)	Rozka	4	0	0	
		(Ukraine)	Borodin	3	0	0	
		(Ukraine)	Myronchenko	2	1	0	
		(Ukraine)	Kovalevskyi	3	0	0	
	GK	(Ukraine)	Oliynyk	3	0	0	
		(Ukraine)	Bashakov	2	0	0	
		(Ukraine)	Larionov	4	0	0	
		(Ukraine)	Rusantsev	2	0	0	
		(Ukraine)	Semuka	3	0	0	
		(Ukraine)	Lilyk	3	0	0	
		(Ukraine)	Vynnyk	2	0	0	
		(Ukraine)	Zhenylenko	2	0	0	
	FW	(Ukraine)	Pryma	1	0	0	
		(Ukraine)	Bohynia	1	0	0	
		(Ukraine)	Horyslavets	1	0	0	
		(Ukraine)	SZavialov	3	0	0	
		(Ukraine)	Kykot	1	0	0	
		(Ukraine)	Huviy	1	0	0	

Last updated: 20 October 2009
Source: Competitive matches
Only competitive matches
(yellow card) = Number of bookings; (second yellow card) = Number of sending offs after a second yellow card; (red card) = Number of sending offs by a direct red card.

=== Captains ===
Includes all competitive matches.

Position	Number	Name	Second League	Cup	Total
1	3	Vynnyk	23	1	24

Last updated on 20 October 2009

== Club ==
=== Coaching staff ===
Position	Staff
Manager	(Ukraine) Serhiy Svystun
Assistant manager	(Ukraine) Leonid Dubdikov
Assistant manager	(Ukraine) Volodymyr Malovanets
Club doctor	(Ukraine) Vitaliy Stepanenko

Last updated: 9 October 2009

=== Other information ===
President	(Ukraine) Oleh Babaev
Director	(Ukraine) Andriy Nediak
Ground (capacity and dimensions)	Polytechnic (11,400 / )

Updated to match played 9 October 2009
Source: Directors

== Competitions ==
=== Overall ===
Competition	Started round	Current position / round	Final position / round	First match	Last match
Ukrainian Second League	1	—	9/24	6 August 2005	24 June 2006
Ukrainian Cup	Preliminary round	—	Preliminary round	1 August 2005	1 August 2005

Updated to match played 9 October 2009
Source: Competitions

== Ukrainian Second League ==
Kremin's third overall and first consecutive season in Druha Liha began on 6 August 2005 and ended on 24 June 2006.

=== Classification ===
Pos	Team	Pld	W	D	L	GF	GA	GD	Pts
7	FC Hazovyk-KhGV Kharkiv	24	10	7	7	41	34	+7	37
8	FC Hirnyk-Sport Komsomolsk	24	10	4	10	30	31	−1	34
9	FC Kremin Kremenchuk	24	9	6	9	22	34	−12	33
10	FC Arsenal Kharkiv	24	9	3	12	35	44	−9	30
11	FC Shakhtar-3 Donetsk	24	8	2	14	32	38	−6	26

=== Matches ===
All kickoff times are in EEST.

6 August 2008	Olimpik	2–3	Kremin	Olimpik, Donetsk
18:00	Kovaliov 20' (yellow card) 86'; Khomutov (yellow card) 90+2'	(Report)	Pryma 28'; Rusantsev 57'; Mironov 80' (o.g.); Semuka 87' (pen.)	Attendance: 300; Referee: Artem Nozdrachov (Kharkiv)

20 August 2005	Kremin	2–2	Yavir	Polytechnic, Kremenchuk
17:00	Kozliuk 66'; Mironov (yellow card) 90'; Rozka (yellow card) 90+3'	(Report)	Myhal 8'; Buzyla 40' (o.g.) (yellow card) 90+2'; Ostrivnyi 52' (yellow card) 29'; Patsiuk (yellow card) 62'	Attendance: 3,800; Referee: Anatoliy Abdula (Kharkiv)

27 August 2008	Hazovyk-KhGV	2–0	Kremin	Hazovyk, Krasnokutsk
17:00	Chekh 31'; Ivleev 51'	(Report)		Attendance: 950; Referee: Mykhailo Rodionenko (Luhansk)

4 September 2005	Kremin	1–1	Shakhtar-3	Polytechnic, Kremenchuk
17:00	Rozka (yellow card) 18'; Semuka 62' (pen.)	(Report)	Kurylov (yellow card) 61'; Malchenko (yellow card) 62'; Hendou (yellow card) 71'; Lutsenko 85'	Attendance: 6,000; Referee: Volodymyr Topikha (Kyiv)

17 September 2005	Kremin	2–1	Nafkom	Polytechnic, Kremenchuk
16:00	Myronchenko (yellow card) 27'; Slipchenko 37'; Borodin (yellow card) 79'; Pryma 82'	(Report)	Myrona (yellow card) 32'; Kovalevskyi 58'	Attendance: 6,000; Referee: Oleksandr Latosha (Dnipropetrovsk)

23 September 2008	Illichivets-2	4–0	Kremin	Zakhidnyi, Mariupol
15:30	Kilikevych (yellow card) 10' (goal) 21'; Antonenko 13' (pen.), 14'; Lilyk (yellow card) 47'; Kolesnyk 75' (pen.)	(Report)	Oliynyk (yellow card) 12'; Kovalevskyi (yellow card) 24'	Attendance: 500; Referee: Oleh Parashchenko (Sumy)

2 October 2005	Kremin	0–2	Dnipro	Polytechnic, Kremenchuk
16:00	Borodin (yellow card) 12'; Rozka (yellow card) 27'; Bashakov (yellow card) 30'; Kovalevskyi (yellow card) 58'	(Report)	Lambrionov (red card) 20'; Varyvoda 37'; Polishchuk 52' (pen.); Tarasenko (yellow card) 70'; Onopko 90+3'	Attendance: 5,800; Referee: Anatoliy Abdula (Kharkiv)

9 October 2008	Metalurh-2	6–1	Kremin	Titan, Zaporizhzhia
16:00	Akchurin 6' (yellow card) 47'; Patiak 21'; Lazarovych (yellow card) 79'; Kryvyi 86'; Sereda 90'	(Report)	Myronenko 4' (o.g.); Borodin (yellow card) 43'; Semuka 63'	Attendance: 200; Referee: Serhiy Skrypak (Kyiv)

15 October 2005	Kremin	2–0	Kharkiv-2	Polytechnic, Kremenchuk
15:30	Pryma 30'; Myronchenko 64'	(Report)	Kyrychenko (yellow card) 44'	Attendance: 2,000; Referee: Mykhailo Rodionenko (Luhansk)

22 October 2008	MFC Oleksandria	0–1	Kremin	Nika, Oleksandriia
15:00	Chernyshenko (yellow card) 67'; Vdovichenkov (yellow card) 78'	(Report)	Larionov (yellow card) 8'; Kozliuk 51'; Rusantsev (yellow card) 82'; Bashakov (yellow card) 90'; Semuka 90+4'	Attendance: 300; Referee: Artem Nozdrachov (Kharkiv)

29 October 2005	Kremin	0–0	Arsenal	Polytechnic, Kremenchuk
14:00	Lilyk (yellow card) 47'; Kovalevskyi (yellow card) 68'; Oliynyk (yellow card) 83'; Rusantsev (yellow card) 85'	(Report)	Frolov (yellow card) 35'; Vazhynskyi (yellow card) 81'	Attendance: 1,500; Referee: Vitaliy Shamych (Kyiv)

5 November 2008	Hirnyk-Sport	2–2	Kremin	Yunist, Komsomolsk
14:00	Berezhnyi (yellow card) 16'; Maksakov 47' (yellow card) 50'; Rotan 70' (pen.)	(Report)	Myronchenko (yellow card) 19' (yellow-red card) 42'; Larionov 22'; Vynnuk (yellow card) 69'; Rusantsev 87'	Attendance: 2,000; Referee: Serhiy Skrypak (Kyiv)

8 April 2006	Kremin	2–1	Olimpik	Polytechnic, Kremenchuk
17:00	Horyslavets 36'; Zhenylenko (yellow card) 76'; Kykot 85'; Pryma (yellow card) 89'	(Report)	Arefiev 10'; Filipov (yellow card) 79'; Ostrovskyi (yellow card) 84'	Attendance: 6,000; Referee: Oleh Parashchenko (Sumy)

13 April 2006	Yavir	2–0	Kremin	Kolos, Sumy
15:00	Patsiuk 15'; Savchenko 59'	(Report)	Zhenylenko (yellow card) 80'	Attendance: 400; Referee: Anton Baklanov (Kryvyi Rih)

19 April 2006	Kremin	0–0	Hazovyk-KhGV	Polytechnic, Kremenchuk
17:00		(Report)	Masiuk (yellow card) 37'; Kozak (yellow card) 53'; Shapovalov (yellow card) 63'; Zarubin (yellow card) 90+2'	Attendance: 6,000; Referee: Vitaliy Shamych (Kyiv)

27 April 2006	Shakhtar-3	2–0	Kremin	Avanhard, Makiivka
17:00	Kaika 37'; Puhovkin (yellow card) 44'; Mykytsei (yellow card) 58'; Kozhanov 73'	(Report)	Lilyk (yellow card) 80'	Attendance: 200; Referee: Volodymyr Bondar (Kharkiv)

13 May 2006	Nafkom	0–0	Kremin	Spartak KOSHSM #2, Brovary
17:00	Koliada (yellow card) 4'; Rasiuk (yellow card) 78'	(Report)	Lilyk (yellow card) 19'; Bohynia (yellow card) 32'; Vynnuk (yellow card) 90+2'	Attendance: 300; Referee: Volodymyr Holovko (Dnipropetrovsk)

20 May 2006	Kremin	1–0	Hazovyk-KhGV	Polytechnic, Kremenchuk
17:00	Semuka (penalty missed); Horyslavets (yellow card) 57'; Kykot 90+4'	(Report)		Attendance: 4,500; Referee: Volodymyr Bondar (Kharkiv)

24 May 2006	Dnipro	2–0	Kremin	Central, Cherkasy
18:00	Polishchuk 17'; Pakholiuk 33' (pen.); Lytovchak (yellow card) 38'; Tarasenko (yellow card) 58'	(Report)	Zavialov (yellow card) 26'; Semuka (yellow card) 30'	Attendance: 2,000; Referee: Dmytro Zhukov (Donetsk)

28 May 2006	Kremin	1–2	Metalurh-2	Polytechnic, Kremenchuk
17:00	Zavialov (yellow card) 43'; Rozka 74'	(Report)	Vernydub 9' (yellow card) 62'; Khrienko (yellow card) 9'; Maliuk (yellow card) 55'; Mykhailov (yellow card) 83'; Skorokhodov (yellow card) 90+3'	Attendance: 6,000; Referee: Artem Nozdrachov (Kharkiv)

3 June 2006	Kharkiv-2	1–2	Kremin	Olimpik, Kharkiv
16:00	Kyzmenko (yellow card) 14'; Taranukha (yellow card) 16'; Syvukha 23'	(Report)	Semuka (yellow card) 55'; Larionov (yellow card) 69'; Kykot 71'	Attendance: 150; Referee: Mykhailo Rodionenko (Luhansk)

11 June 2006	Kremin	w/o	MFC Oleksandria	Polytechnic, Kremenchuk
		(Report)

17 June 2006	Arsenal	2–0	Kremin	Arsenal-Bavaria, Kharkiv
18:00	Sumtsov 25' (yellow card) 50'; Diachenko (yellow card) 61'; Andrianov 69'	(Report)	Larionov (yellow card) 39'; Zavialov (yellow card) 60'	Attendance: 700; Referee: Vitaliy Diadenko (Kirovohrad)

24 June 2006	Kremin	2–0	Hirnyk-Sport	Polytechnic, Kremenchuk
18:00	Kykot 28'; Oliynyk (yellow card) 30'; Rusantsev 45+1'; Hubiy (yellow card) 60'	(Report)	Malynochka (yellow card) 24'; Kondrashov (yellow card) 26'; Rotan (yellow card) 36' (yellow-red card) 70'; Alifanov (yellow card) 45'; Berezhnyi (yellow card) 68'; Mysyaylo (yellow card) 81'; Maksakov (yellow card) 90+1'	Attendance: 3,500; Referee: Oleh Parashchenko (Sumy)

Win Tie Loss

== Ukrainian Cup ==
=== Preliminary round ===
1 August 2005	Hirnyk-Sport	2–1	Kremin	Yunist, Komsomolsk
18:00	Cherkasov 20'; Rotan (penalty missed) (yellow card) 57'; Leonov 90+2'	(Report)	Vynnyk (yellow card) 69'; Lysytskyi (yellow card) 88' (goal) 88'	Attendance: 1,500; Referee: Mykola Danylenko (Berdyansk)

=== Disciplinary record ===
N	Pos.	Nat.	Name	Yellow card	Second yellow card	Red card	Notes
		(Ukraine)	Vynnyk	1	0	0	
		(Ukraine)	Lysytskyi	1	0	0	

Last updated: 9 October 2009
Source: Competitive matches
Only competitive matches
(yellow card) = Number of bookings; (second yellow card) = Number of sending offs after a second yellow card; (red card) = Number of sending offs by a direct red card.
