= List of FC Kremin Kremenchuk seasons =

This is a record of all seasons played by Kremin Kremenchuk since their foundation in 1959.

- 1st team - Dnipro Kremenchuk - 1959-1962
- 2nd team - Dnipro Kremenchuk - 1963–1969
- 3rd team - Kremin Kremenchuk - 1986-2000
- 4th team - Kremin Kremenchuk - 2003–present

== Seasons ==
Season	Div	League record								Ukrainian Cup	Other	Top scorer	
		P	W	D	L	F	A	Pts	Pos				
1960											PO Cup W		
1963	B UZ1	38	8	6	25	32	82	14	20th				
1964	B UZ2	30	7	5	18	24	54	19	16th				
1965	B UZ1	30	9	13	8	21	21	31	5th				
1966	B UZ2	38	19	12	7	44	26	50	3rd				
1967	B UZ1	40	22	6	12	51	33	50	3rd		UF 3rd		
1968	A2 SG2	40	7	14	19	23	46	28	18th			Henadiy Erofeev/Anatoliy Tahidin	5
1969	B UZ1	40	17	15	8	45	27	49	5th				
No competitive football was played since the club ceased to exist
1987											PO Cup SF		
1988											U KFK W		
1989	S3rd Z6	52	21	18	13	59	50	60	6th			Serhiy Muradian	12
1990	S3rd WB	42	16	11	15	49	45	43	10th			Serhiy Shevchenko	10
1991	S3rd WB	42	16	9	17	56	50	41	13th			Serhiy Muradian	14
Club began playing games in Ukrainian Premier League
1992	1st	18	4	8	6	17	23	16	7th	1/8		Ivan Korponay	7
1992-93	1st	30	8	11	11	23	40	27	9th	1/8			
1993-94	1st	34	9	8	17	26	39	26	15th	QF			
1994-95	1st	34	12	6	16	42	54	42	10th	1/8		Andriy Fedkov	12
1995-96	1st	34	14	4	16	46	56	46	9th	SF		Ivan Korponay	11
1996-97	1st	30	7	3	20	28	57	24	15th	1/8			
1997-98	2nd	42	16	7	19	55	53	45	14th	1/32			
1998-99	2nd	38	11	7	20	34	63	40	17th	1/16			
1999-00	3rd	26	17	1	7	44	22	55	2nd	1/8			
2000-01	3rd	30	7	7	16	24	38	28	14th	1/8			
No competitive football was played since the club ceased to exist
2003-04	PO	16	12	2	2	53	7	38	1st		PO Cup W	Oleksiy Solnyshkin	11
2004-05	PO	16	15	0	1	40	10	45	1st		PO Cup QF	Yuri Bohynia	9
2005-06	3rd C	24	9	6	9	22	34	33	9th	PR1		Sergiy Kikot	4
2006-07	3rd B	28	6	7	15	20	35	25	14th	1/32		Dmytro Pryma	4
2007-08	3rd B	34	14	8	12	49	46	50	8th	PR2		Roman Loktionov	18

== Key ==
Key to league record:

- P – games played
- W – games won
- D – games drawn
- L – games lost
- F – goals for
- A – goals against
- Pts – points
- Pos – final position

Key to rounds:

- PR1 – 1st Preliminary Round
- PR2 – 2nd Preliminary Round
- QF - Quarter-finals
- W - Winners

Key to divisions:

- SU Cup - Soviet Cup
- S3rd - Soviet Second League
- Z - Zone in the Soviet Second League
- WB - Western Buffer Zone in the Soviet Second League
- UZ - Ukrainian Zone in the Soviet Second League
- B - Class B in Soviet Championship
- A2 SG2 - Class B, Second Subgroup in Soviet Championship
- UF - Ukrainian Soviet competitions
- U KFK - Ukrainian championship among collectives of physical culture
- 1st - Ukrainian Premier League
- 2nd - Ukrainian First League
- 3rd - Ukrainian Second League
- PO - Poltava Oblast Cup

Promoted	Relegated	Winners	Runners up

- Bold text indicates a competition won.
- Top scorer shown **in bold** when he was also top scorer for the division.
- Division shown **in bold** when it changes due to promotion, relegation or reorganization.
- Where fields are left blank, the club did not participate in a competition that season.
