= Vasyl Kryvoruchko =

Ukrainian footballer and journalist (born 1980)

Personal information
- Full name: Vasyl Oleksandrovych Kryvoruchko
- Date of birth: 1 December 1980 (age 45)
- Place of birth: Svitlovodsk, Ukrainian SSR
- Position: Midfielder

Senior career*
Years	Team	Apps	(Gls)
1997–1998	Zirka-2 Kirovohrad	6	(0)
1999–2002	Kremez Kremenchuk	8	(0)
2003–2004	Kremin Kremenchuk	20	(7)
- * Club domestic league appearances and goals

Vasyl Oleksandrovych Kryvoruchko (Ukrainian: Василь Олександрович Криворучко; born 1 December 1980) is a retired Ukrainian professional footballer who played as a midfielder, a well-known Kremenchuk sports journalist and current head of public relations for Kolos Kovalivka.

== Early life ==
Vasyl Kryvoruchko was born on 12 January 1980 in Svitlovodsk, Ukraine. Between 1988 and 2000 he attended Gymnasium #4 and School #10. Kryvoruchko began playing football when he was six years old.

== Playing career ==
Kryvoruchko played for Zirka-2 Kirovohrad in 1997–1998. He later played for Kremez. During the 2003–2004 he played for Kremin Kremenchuk where he scored ten goals in twenty-five appearances. He continues to play at local level.

== After retirement ==
Kryvoruchko became a sports journalist and wrote for various newspapers including Kremenchuk Sportyvnyi, Kremenchuk Telegraf,

He worked for Kremin Kremenchuk as head of press service, HC Kremenchuk and BK Kremenchuk. He also managed amateur club FC Lukas. From 2015 Kryvoruchko became a Kremin commentator while also covering hockey matches. He also worked as a sports commentator in Kremenchuk Hromadske. He also worked as a director for Kremin TV from 2015 to 2019. In July of 2019 he joined Kolos Kovalivka as head of their press service.

== Personal life ==
Kryvoruchko has a son Oleh Kryvoruchko (born 10 November 2004) who is a professional footballer for Kolos Kovalivka.

== Honours ==
Kremin

- Poltava Oblast Championship: 2003–04, 2004–05
- Poltava Oblast Cup: 2003–04

== Sources ==
- Pyrukhin, Yurii (n.d.), МФК "Кремень" Кременчуг 2003-2005 [MFC "Kremin" Kremenchuk 2003-2005] (in Russian), Kremenchuk
- Lomov, Anatolii; Stadnychenko, Oleksandr (2009), 100 Років Полтавському Футболу [100 Years of Poltava Football] (in Ukrainian), Poltava: Poltava, ISBN 978-966-97035-0-7
