= Polytechnic Stadium =

Polytechnic Stadium may refer to:

- Polytechnic Stadium (Kremenchuk)
- Polytechnic Stadium (London)
