= Pryma =

Pryma is a surname. Notable people with the surname include:

- Artem Pryma (born 1987), Ukrainian biathlete
- Dmytro Pryma (born 1985), Ukrainian footballer
- Roma Pryma-Bohachevsky (1927–2004), Ukrainian ballerina
- Roman Pryma (born 1981), Ukrainian biathlete
