= Ihor Lahoyda =

Ukrainian footballer and coach

Personal information
- Full name: Ihor Yaroslavovych Lahoyda
- Date of birth: 23 August 1978 (age 48)
- Height: 1.70 m (5 ft 7 in)
- Positions: Defender; midfielder

Youth career
- LGUVK Lviv

Senior career*
Years	Team	Apps	(Gls)
1994–1997	FC Lviv (1992)	54	(3)
1996–1997	FC Dynamo-2 Kyiv	3	(0)
1996–1997	→ FC Dynamo-3 Kyiv (loan)	6	(1)
1997	FC Verkhovyna Uzhhorod	5	(1)
1997–1999	FC Dynamo-2 Kyiv	25	(0)
1997–1999	→ FC Dynamo-3 Kyiv (loans)	32	(4)
1999	FC Uralan Elista	23	(0)
2000	FC Zirka Kirovohrad	1	(0)
2000	→ FC Zirka-2 Kirovohrad (loan)	8	(0)
2000	FC Zakarpattya Uzhhorod	14	(0)
2001	FC Polissya Zhytomyr	31	(1)
2002–2004	FC Podillya Khmelnytskyi	55	(5)
2004–2005	FC Osvita Borodianka	17	(3)
2005–2006	FC Yednist' Plysky	23	(2)
2007–2009	FC Yednist-2 Plysky	27	(14)
2010	FC Zirka Kyiv		
2012–2013	FC Favoryt Brovary Raion		

Managerial career
- 2012–2013: FC Favoryt Brovary Raion (assistant)
- * Club domestic league appearances and goals

Ihor Yaroslavovych Lahoyda (Ukrainian: Ігор Ярославович Лагойда; born 23 August 1978) is a Ukrainian football coach and a former player.
