= 1999–2000 Ukrainian Second League =

Ukrainian Second League
- Season: 1999–2000
- Champions: Bukovyna Chernivtsi (A); Borysfen Boryspil (B); Dnipro-2 Dnipropetrovsk (C)
- Relegated: Nyva Vinnytsia (A); Viktor Zaporizhzhia (B); Obolon-PPO-2 Kyiv (B); Myrhorod (C); Shakhtar Horlivka (C)
- Top goalscorer: 21 - Vasyl Shved (Hazovyk Komarno)

The 1999–2000 Ukrainian Second League was the ninth season of 3rd level professional football in Ukraine. The competitions were divided into three groups – A, B, and C.

The groups were won respectively by FC Bukovyna Chernivtsi, FC Borysfen Boryspil and FC Dnipro-2 Dnipropetrovsk.

== Team changes ==
=== Promoted ===
The following team were promoted from the 1998–99 Ukrainian Football Amateur League:

- FC Dynamo Lviv – (debut)
- FC Arsenal Kharkiv – (debut)
- FC Obolon-Zmina-2 Kyiv – (debut)

Also, four more clubs were admitted additionally:

- FC Nyva Vinnytsia – (debut)
- FC Prykarpattia-2 Ivano-Frankivsk – (debut)
- FC ADOMS Kremenchuk– (debut)
- FC Mashynobudivnyk Druzhkivka – (debut)

=== Relegated ===
The following team were relegated from the 1998–99 Ukrainian First League:

- FC Podillya Khmelnytskyi – (returning after an absence of a season)
- FC Kremin Kremenchuk – (returning after an absence of 8 seasons, previously in the 1991 Soviet tier–3 competitions)
- FC Bukovyna Chernivtsi – (returning after an absence of 9 seasons, previously in the 1990 Soviet tier–3 competitions)
- FC Desna Chernihiv – (returning after an absence of 2 seasons)

== Group A ==
New clubs: Bukovyna Chernivtsi, Podillya Khmelnytskyi, Dynamo Lviv, Nyva Vinnytsia (the farm team of FC Vinnytsia), Prykarpattia-2 Ivano-Frankivsk.

=== Location map ===
Locations of team home grounds in Ukrainian Second League 1992-93

=== Standings ===
Pos	Team	Pld	W	D	L	GF	GA	GD	Pts	Promotion or relegation
1	Bukovyna Chernivtsi	30	22	7	1	65	13	+52	73	Promoted to First League
2	Podillya Khmelnytskyi	30	21	5	4	67	27	+40	68	
3	Enerhetyk Burshtyn	30	16	5	9	38	27	+11	53	
4	Tsementnyk-Khorda Mykolaiv	30	14	8	8	38	24	+14	50	
5	Systema-Boreks Borodyanka	30	12	11	7	32	17	+15	47	
6	Dynamo Lviv	30	13	6	11	35	33	+2	45	
7	Hazovyk Komarno	30	12	7	11	43	40	+3	43	
8	Karpaty-2 Lviv	30	12	6	12	43	43	0	42	
9	Dynamo-3 Kyiv	30	10	11	9	38	26	+12	41	
10	Naftovyk Dolyna	30	8	12	10	26	32	−6	36	
11	Papirnyk Malyn	30	8	9	13	29	40	−11	33	Withdrew
12	Prykarpattia-2 Ivano-Frankivsk	30	9	4	17	22	45	−23	31	
13	Halychyna Drohobych	30	8	7	15	27	41	−14	31	
14	Veres Rivne	30	7	7	16	32	51	−19	28	
15	Kalush	30	6	6	18	19	51	−32	24	
16	Nyva Vinnytsia	30	3	7	20	22	66	−44	16	Relegated to Amateurs

Source: RSSSF

== Results ==
Home \ Away	BUC	POD	EBU	MYK	IBO	DLV	HZV	K3L	D3K	NDO	PMA	P2IF	HDR	VER	KAL	N2V
Bukovyna Chernivtsi	—	3–1	4–0	3–1	0–0	2–2	3–0	2–0	0–0	2–0	2–0	2–0	2–0	2–1	2–0	1–0
Podillya Khmelnytskyi	1–0	—	1–2	2–0	2–1	1–0	4–0	4–1	1–2	4–0	5–0	2–1	6–2	2–0	0–0	5–2
Enerhetyk Burshtyn	0–3	1–1	—	3–1	2–0	1–0	1–2	1–0	2–1	1–0	3–1	2–0	2–0	1–0	3–0	0–1
Tsementnyk-Khorda Mykolaiv	1–2	0–1	2–0	—	0–0	1–1	1–1	0–1	1–0	2–1	2–1	4–0	1–0	3–1	4–1	3–0
Systema-Boreks Borodyanka	1–1	0–0	1–0	1–1	—	1–2	3–1	0–1	1–0	0–0	1–0	4–1	0–0	2–0	1–0	3–0
Dynamo Lviv	1–6	2–0	1–0	0–2	1–1	—	2–0	0–1	0–0	1–0	0–0	1–0	3–1	3–1	4–0	2–0
Hazovyk Komarno	0–0	0–1	1–0	1–3	1–0	4–0	—	4–2	2–1	3–1	0–0	5–0	0–1	4–1	1–1	4–1
Karpaty-2 Lviv	1–2	1–3	0–0	0–1	1–0	3–1	6–2	—	0–0	2–3	3–1	1–1	3–1	2–0	1–1	3–0
Dynamo-3 Kyiv	0–1	1–1	3–0	0–0	1–1	2–0	1–1	3–3	—	1–1	3–0	1–0	3–0	2–1	1–2	4–1
Naftovyk Dolyna	0–1	0–2	1–1	1–1	0–1	2–1	1–1	1–0	0–0	—	3–1	1–1	1–0	0–0	2–1	1–1
Papirnyk Malyn	1–1	3–3	0–3	1–0	0–0	0–2	0–0	1–1	1–0	1–0	—	1–0	-/+	3–3	4–0	3–0
Prykarpattia-2 Ivano-Frankivsk	1–4	2–4	0–1	2–0	0–3	1–0	0–1	4–0	0–3	0–1	1–0	—	2–1	1–1	1–0	+/-
Halychyna Drohobych	1–1	1–2	1–1	0–0	0–3	0–0	1–0	0–3	3–1	0–0	3–1	0–0	—	3–1	1–0	6–0
Veres Rivne	0–3	1–4	1–4	0–2	1–0	2–1	2–1	4–0	0–3	0–0	0–0	0–1	3–1	—	3–0	1–1
Kalush	0–4	1–2	0–2	0–1	0–2	0–1	1–0	2–1	1–1	1–3	0–2	2–1	1–0	1–1	—	1–0
Nyva Vinnytsia	0–6	0–2	1–1	0–0	1–1	1–3	2–3	1–2	2–0	2–2	1–3	0–1	1–0	1–3	2–2	—

Source: uafootball.net.ua
Legend: Blue = home team win; Yellow = draw; Red = away team win.

== Group B ==
New club: Obolon-Zmina-2 Kyiv

=== Location map ===
Locations of team home grounds in Ukrainian Second League 1992-93

=== Standings ===
Pos	Team	Pld	W	D	L	GF	GA	GD	Pts	Promotion or relegation
1	Borysfen Boryspil	26	19	3	4	57	9	+48	60	Promoted to First League
2	Obolon-PPO-2 Kyiv	26	18	5	3	44	15	+29	59	Relegated to Amateurs
3	Kryvbas-2 Kryvyi Rih	26	16	3	7	55	28	+27	51	
4	Portovyk Illichivsk	26	13	3	10	39	37	+2	42	
5	Kherson (Note: During the winter break Krystal Kherson changed its name to Kherson, while Torpedo Melitopol became OLKOM Melitopol.)	26	12	5	9	40	30	+10	41	
6	Tytan Armiansk	26	11	4	11	30	34	−4	37	
7	Hirnyk-Sport Komsomolsk	26	10	5	11	33	41	−8	35	
8	OLKOM Melitopol	26	10	4	12	26	30	−4	34	
9	Zirka-2 Kirovohrad	26	8	8	10	23	36	−13	32	Withdrew
10	Ryhonda Bila Tserkva	26	10	2	14	33	47	−14	32	
11	Chornomorets Sevastopol	26	10	2	14	22	33	−11	32	Withdrew
12	Metalurh-2 Zaporizhzhia	26	6	7	13	26	39	−13	25	
13	Olimpia Pivdenoukrainsk	26	5	5	16	19	34	−15	20	
14	Viktor Zaporizhzhia	26	3	6	17	15	49	−34	15	Relegated to Amateurs

Source: RSSSF

== Results ==
Home \ Away	BOR	OB2	K2K	PIL	KRK	TAR	HIS	OLM	Z2K	ROS	SEV	M2Z	YZH	VZA
Borysfen Boryspil	—	0–2	4–0	4–0	2–0	1–2	4–0	2–0	0–0	5–0	4–0	3–0	0–0	4–0
Obolon-PPO-2 Kyiv	1–0	—	3–3	3–1	4–1	2–0	1–0	2–1	5–0	2–0	1–0	2–0	2–0	1–0
Kryvbas-2 Kryvyi Rih	0–2	1–2	—	3–0	3–1	4–1	2–0	5–0	4–0	3–1	0–1	3–2	1–0	4–0
Portovyk Illichivsk	0–1	3–0	2–2	—	1–0	2–1	1–1	2–1	3–1	4–2	0–2	1–1	2–0	4–1
Kherson	1–0	0–0	2–2	1–0	—	0–1	5–2	1–1	2–0	2–2	6–0	1–4	1–0	3–0
Tytan Armiansk	0–3	0–0	0–1	2–1	2–1	—	1–4	2–0	1–1	1–0	1–0	1–0	1–1	3–0
Hirnyk-Sport Komsomolsk	0–4	0–0	0–2	3–0	1–0	0–3	—	0–0	4–1	1–0	2–0	3–1	3–2	2–2
OLKOM Melitopol	0–2	1–0	0–2	2–4	0–2	1–0	2–0	—	4–0	2–0	1–2	2–0	1–0	0–0
Zirka-2 Kirovohrad	1–2	0–1	1–0	2–1	0–0	2–1	1–0	0–0	—	5–0	+/-	1–1	1–4	4–0
Ryhonda Bila Tserkva	1–3	0–5	3–2	0–2	0–1	2–1	3–1	2–0	2–0	—	3–1	1–1	1–0	0–0
Chornomorets Sevastopol	0–0	1–2	0–1	0–1	3–2	2–1	1–2	0–1	0–0	2–0	—	2–0	2–1	2–1
Metalurh-2 Zaporizhzhia	1–3	2–1	0–4	1–2	1–2	4–1	3–0	0–4	0–0	1–0	2–0	—	0–0	1–1
Olimpia Pivdenoukrainsk	0–3	0–1	1–2	0–1	1–2	2–2	1–3	1–0	1–1	1–3	1–0	1–0	—	1–0
Viktor Zaporizhzhia	0–1	1–1	2–1	3–1	0–3	0–1	1–1	1–2	0–1	1–3	0–1	0–0	1–0	—

Source: uafootball.net.ua
Legend: Blue = home team win; Yellow = draw; Red = away team win.

== Group C ==
New clubs: Desna Chernihiv, Kremin Kremenchuk, ADOMS Kremenchuk, Mashynobudivnyk Druzhkivka, Arsenal Kharkiv.

=== Location map ===
Locations of team home grounds in Ukrainian Second League 1992-93

=== Standings ===
Pos	Team	Pld	W	D	L	GF	GA	GD	Pts	Promotion or relegation
1	Dnipro-2 Dnipropetrovsk	26	17	6	3	44	15	+29	57	Promoted to First League
2	ADOMS Kremenchuk	26	18	1	7	44	22	+22	55	
3	Zorya Luhansk	26	17	2	7	42	21	+21	53	
4	Arsenal Kharkiv	26	15	4	7	24	13	+11	49	
5	Elektron Romny	26	12	9	5	28	19	+9	45	
6	Kremin Kremenchuk	26	14	1	11	37	39	−2	43	Withdrew
7	Oskil Kupyansk	26	12	6	8	29	17	+12	42	
8	Mashbud Druzhkivka	26	11	5	10	22	31	−9	38	
9	Desna Chernihiv	26	11	5	10	27	32	−5	38	
10	Avanhard Rovenky	26	10	1	15	25	46	−21	31	
11	Metalist-2 Kharkiv	26	8	5	13	21	31	−10	29	
12	Vorskla-2 Poltava	26	4	5	17	25	60	−35	17	
13	Shakhtar Horlivka	26	2	5	19	11	13	−2	11	Withdrew (Note: Myrhorod and Shakhtar Horlivka folded during the first half and withdrew from competition.)
14	Myrhorod	26	1	3	22	8	28	−20	6	Withdrew

Source: RSSSF

== Results ==
Home \ Away	D2D	AKR	ZOR	KHA	ERO	KRE	OKU	MDR	DES	AVR	M2K	V2P	SHO	MRH
Dnipro-2 Dnipropetrovsk	—	2–1	3–0	1–0	+/-	5–1	0–0	0–0	0–1	5–0	3–0	6–0	1–1	+/-
ADOMS Kremenchuk	2–3	—	1–0	1–0	2–2	4–0	3–0	4–2	1–0	2–0	4–0	2–1	+/-	2–0
Zorya Luhansk	1–1	2–0	—	0–2	2–0	1–2	1–0	1–0	3–1	6–0	2–0	4–1	3–1	+/-
Arsenal Kharkiv	2–0	1–0	3–0	—	0–0	+/-	1–0	1–0	1–1	1–0	0–0	5–1	1–0	3–0
Elektron Romny	0–1	0–3	1–1	1–0	—	2–1	1–1	1–0	0–0	3–1	4–1	1–1	1–0	+/-
Kremin Kremenchuk	2–4	0–2	0–2	0–1	2–0	—	1–1	2–1	4–0	3–1	2–1	4–0	2–1	+/-
Oskil Kupyansk	0–1	3–1	0–1	1–0	0–0	3–1	—	6–0	1–0	2–0	2–1	1–0	+/-	4–1
Mashbud Druzhkivka	1–0	0–2	2–1	2–0	0–0	1–2	1–0	—	2–1	1–0	2–1	1–0	+/-	0–0
Desna Chernihiv	2–2	2–1	0–3	0–0	0–1	5–1	1–0	1–1	—	2–0	1–2	3–1	+/-	2–1
Avanhard Rovenky	0–1	0–2	1–0	0–2	1–3	3–0	1–0	3–1	4–0	—	2–1	4–1	+/-	2–2
Metalist-2 Kharkiv	0–1	2–0	2–0	2–0	0–0	0–1	1–1	0–1	0–1	3–0	—	1–1	0–0	+/-
Vorskla-2 Poltava	1–1	2–3	0–2	3–0	1–5	0–4	0–3	1–1	2–3	1–2	2–3	—	+/-	4–0
Shakhtar Horlivka	-/+	0–1	-/+	-/+	-/+	-/+	0–0	1–2	1–0	4–0	-/+	1–1	—	-/-
Myrhorod	0–3	-/+	0–3	-/+	1–2	1–2	-/+	-/+	-/+	-/+	1–0	-/+	1–1	—

Source: uafootball.net.ua
Legend: Blue = home team win; Yellow = draw; Red = away team win.

== See also ==
- 1999–2000 Ukrainian Premier League
- 1999–2000 Ukrainian First League
- 1999 Ukrainian Football Amateur League
- 2000 Ukrainian Football Amateur League
