= 1993–94 FC Kremin Kremenchuk season =

Kremin
1993–94 season
- Head coach: (Ukraine) Evhen Rudakov
- Ukrainian Premier League: 15th
- Ukrainian Cup: Quarter-final

The 1993-94 season was FC Kremin Kremenchuk's 3rd consecutive season in the Ukrainian Premier League.

== Events ==
- October 1993 - after 8 games head coach Boris Streltsov is replaced with Tyberiy Korponay.
- November 1993 at the end of first half of the season head coach Tyberiy Korponay leaves the team.
- March 1994 - July 1994 - Yevhen Rudakov is the head coach for the team.

== Players ==
=== Squad information ===
Note: Flags indicate national team as defined under FIFA eligibility rules; some limited exceptions apply. Players may hold more than one non-FIFA nationality.

No.	Pos.	Nation	Player
—	GK	(Ukraine) UKR	Yuriy Chumak
—	GK	(Ukraine) UKR	Pavlo Sirotin
—	DF	(Ukraine) UKR	Viacheslav Zhenylenko
—	DF	(Kyrgyzstan) KGZ	Aleksandr Korzanov
—	DF	(Ukraine) UKR	Serhii Lukash
—	DF	(Ukraine) UKR	Oleh Ratiy
—	DF	(Russia) RUS	Sergei Troitskiy (captain)
—	DF	(Ukraine) UKR	Volodymyr Khlan

No.	Pos.	Nation	Player
—	MF	(Russia) RUS	Valery Alistarov
—	MF	(Ukraine) UKR	Ihor Humeniuk
—	MF	(Ukraine) UKR	Volodymyr Dychko
—	MF	(Kyrgyzstan) KGZ	Oleg Kazmirchuk
—	MF	(Ukraine) UKR	Volodymyr Konovalchuk
—	MF	(Ukraine) UKR	Adalbert Korponay
—	MF	(Russia) RUS	Yevgeni Kryachik
—	MF	(Ukraine) UKR	Yurii Len
—	MF	(Ukraine) UKR	Ramis Mansurov
—	MF	(Ukraine) UKR	Serhii Sherabokov
—	MF	(Ukraine) UKR	Oleksandr Yankovskyi
—	FW	(Ukraine) UKR	Oleksandr Pindeyev
—	FW	(Russia) RUS	Andrei Fedkov

== Ukrainian Premier League ==
=== League table ===
Pos	Team	Pld	W	D	L	GF	GA	GD	Pts	Qualification or relegation
13	Torpedo Zaporizhzhia	34	9	10	15	27	39	−12	28	
14	Zorya-MALS Luhansk	34	10	6	18	24	46	−22	26	
15	Kremin Kremenchuk	34	9	8	17	26	39	−13	26	
16	Metalurh Zaporizhzhia	34	9	6	19	26	49	−23	24	
17	Bukovyna Chernivtsi (R)	34	7	6	21	25	51	−26	20	Relegated to Ukrainian First League

Source: uafootball.net.ua
Rules for classification: 1st points; 2nd wins; 3rd goal difference
(R) Relegated
