= Oleksandr Yankovskyi =

Ukrainian footballer (born 1969)

Personal information
- Full name: Oleksandr Leonidovych Yankovskyi
- Date of birth: 10 November 1969 (age 56)
- Place of birth: Belovodskoye, Kirghiz SSR, Soviet Union
- Height: 1.82 m (6 ft 0 in)
- Position: Midfielder

Youth career
- 1980–: DYuSSh Belovodskoye
- –1986: Republican School of Olympic Reserve Frunze

Senior career*
Years	Team	Apps	(Gls)
1986–1992	Alga Frunze	150	(33)
1992	Naftokhimik Kremenchuk	2	(1)
1992–1994	Kremin Kremenchuk	51	(8)
1994–1995	CSKA–Borysfen Kyiv	8	(1)
1995–1996	Vorskla Poltava	51	(5)
1996–1997	Kremin Kremenchuk	28	(4)
1997	→ Hirnyk-Sport Komsomolsk (loan)	2	(0)
1997–1998	Metalurh Zaporizhzhia	5	(2)
1999	Kremin Kremenchuk	28	(6)
1999	→ Dnipro Cherkasy (loan)	4	(0)
2000	Adoms Kremenchuk	22	(5)
2001–2002	Zirka Kirovohrad	52	(6)
2003–2004	Kremin Kremenchuk	4	(1)

Managerial career
- 2010–2016: Kolos Kobeliaky
- * Club domestic league appearances and goals

Oleksandr Yankovskyi (Ukrainian: Олександр Леонідович Янковський; born 10 November 1969) is a retired Soviet and Ukrainian professional footballer who played as a midfielder and current coach for Kremin Academy in Kremenchuk.

== Early life ==
Oleksandr Yankovskyi was born on 10 November 1969 in Belovodskoye, Kirghiz SSR, Soviet Union. When he was eleven years old a DYuSSh Belovodskoye sports school opened in his village. He began training there under coach Vasyl Chmyr. Because of close proximity to Frunze he continuously received invitations to train in the Republican School of Olympic Reserve. After his mother's death, his father agreed to send him to that school. He played in many positions before settling in midfield.

== Playing career ==
=== Alga ===
While he was studying at the Republican School of Olympic Reserve he began playing for local club Alga Frunze. He made his debut in the 1986 Soviet Second League Zone VII (Central Asia) when he was sixteen years old. In 1992 the first season of the Kyrgyz Premier League was played. Yankovskyi scored ten goals in ten games and won the league. Club had financial difficulties and had not paid the players regularly. Semen Osynovskyi who also played in the team convinced Yankovskyi to leave Alga and move to Ukraine.

=== Naftokhimik ===
During 1992 he played for Ukrainian Transitional League club Naftokhimik Kremenchuk. Yankovskyi made his debut on 5 September in a 2:0 win against Andezyt Khust. He scored a week later in a match against Promin Volia-Baranetska.

=== Kremin ===
Yankovskyi joined Kremin Kremenchuk in September 1992. He played wearing number eight jersey. His debut was on 13 September replacing Yaroslav Bobyliak on seventy-eight minute. By April 1993 he was becoming one of the clubs leaders.

=== CSKA–Borysfen ===
In July 1994 Ivan Terletskyi persuaded Yankovskyi to join him at CSKA–Borysfen Kyiv. During his early days with the club he received an injury to Achilles tendon. When a new manager Mykhaylo Fomenko joined the club, Yankovskyi fell out of favor and left the club at the end of season. He made eight appearances for the club and scored one goal.

=== Vorskla Poltava ===
Vorskla Poltava manager Viktor Pozhechevskyi invited Yankovskyi to join the club in 1995. He played at the club for two seasons, winning the league in his second year. In his second year at the club Yankovskyi played as a defensive midfielder and featured in thirty-nine matches, scoring three goals. After winning the league in 1996 he was awarded with the title Master of Sports of Ukraine.

=== Return to Kremin ===
Yankovskyi rejoined Kremin in July 1996. He played in twenty-eight matches scoring four times. He also played in two cup games. On 27 June 1997 it was reported that Yankovskyi was leaving the club and joining Metalurh Zaporizhzhia.

=== Hirnyk-Sport ===
During 1997 Yankovskyi played in two matches for Kremin farm club Hirnyk-Sport Komsomolsk.

=== Metalurh ===
Yankovskyi only featured in five matches during the 1997–98 season. He scored twice. He received a back injury that prevented him from playing for a year.

=== Return to Kremin ===
Since Yankovskyi was injured he was loaned to Kremin. By January 1999 he began individual training. He became Kremin captain during the season.

=== Dnipro Cherkasy ===
Yankovskyi joined first league club Dnipro Cherkasy for four matches in October and November 1999.

=== Adoms ===
As Kremin was having financial difficulties, Yankovskyi began training with another Kremenchuk club Adoms Kremenchuk on 3 February 2000. He made his debut on 1 April 2000 in a 3:2 win against Vorskla-2 Poltava. He scored his first goal for Adoms from the penalty spot on 21 April 2000. He played in twenty-two matches and scored five goals for the club.

=== Zirka ===
Yankovskyi left Adoms and joined Zirka Kirovohrad before the start Spring part of championship. he spent three years with the club. In 2002–03 season he helped Zirka win the league and gain promotion to Premier League.

=== Return to Kremin ===
In 2003 Kremin was recreated as a city owned football club. Yankovskyi joined the club and played in four matches in the Poltava Oblast Championship scoring one goal.

== International career ==
He was called up to a Kirghiz SDYuShOR and took part in an all-union competition. He was the top goalscorer and was chosen as best player.

Boris Ignatyev manager of the USSR U19 team called Yankovskyi to the training camp at Leselidze. Before the start of camp Yankovskyi scratched his leg, which led to became swollen and he was sent home by the team doctor. His next call-up came to the Novogorsk training center for a friendly match with a West Germany U19 team. Yankovskyi fell and injured himself while receiving a ball. He never received another call-up.

== Coaching career ==
After retiring from playing president of Zirka Kirovohrad proposed to him that he would remain at the club and begin coaching children. Yankovskyi chose to remain in Kremenchuk and begin coaching there. He has been kids coach with Kremin for over twenty years. His first group were players born in 1995. After those players graduated he took on players born in 2005. His next class were players born in 2015.

=== Kolos Kobeliaky ===
From 2010 to 2016 Yankovskyi managed FC Kolos Kobeliaky participating in Poltava Oblast Championship.

=== Kremin-2 ===
On 7 April 2021 it was announced that Kremin-2 declared that it entered Poltava Oblast Championship. It was clubs intention to play with footballers born in 2004 and 2005 in the Vyshcha Liha (Major League) of the championship. Kremin Academy U-17 coach Yevhen Marynych was appointed as manager and academy U-16 coach Yankovskyi was appointed as an assistant.

== Career statistics ==
Appearances and goals by club, season and competition
Club	Season	League			Cup		Other		Total	
Club	Season	Division	Apps	Goals	Apps	Goals	Apps	Goals	Apps	Goals
Alga Frunze	1986	Soviet Second League	13	0	—		—		13	0
Alga Frunze	1987	Soviet Second League	28	3	—		—		28	3
Alga Frunze	1988	Soviet Second League	13	3	—		—		13	3
Alga Frunze	1989	Soviet Second League	2	1	—		—		2	1
Alga Frunze	1990	Soviet Second League	42	8	—		—		48	8
Alga Frunze	1991	Soviet Second League	42	8	—		—		42	8
Alga Frunze	1992	Kyrgyz Premier League	10	10	—		—		10	10
Alga Frunze	Total		150	33	0	0	—		150	33
Naftokhimik Kremenchuk	1992–93	Ukrainian Transitional League	2	1	—		—		2	1
Kremin Kremenchuk	1992–93	Vyshcha Liha	23	4	3	0	—		26	3
Kremin Kremenchuk	1993–94	Vyshcha Liha	28	4	5	2	—		33	6
Kremin Kremenchuk	Total		51	8	8	2	—		59	10
CSKA–Borysfen Kyiv	1994–95	Ukrainian First League	8	1	—		—		8	1
Vorskla Poltava	1994–95	Ukrainian First League	12	2	—		—		12	2
Vorskla Poltava	1995–96	Ukrainian First League	39	3	1	0	—		40	3
Vorskla Poltava	Total		51	5	1	0	—		52	5
Kremin Kremenchuk	1996–97	Vyshcha Liha	28	4	2	0	—		30	4
Hirnyk-Sport Komsomolsk	1996–97	Ukrainian Second League	2	0	—		—		2	0
Metalurh Zaporizhzhia	1997–98	Vyshcha Liha	5	2	2	0	—		7	2
Kremin Kremenchuk	1998–99	Ukrainian First League	16	3	—		—		16	3
Kremin Kremenchuk	1999–2000	Ukrainian Second League	12	3	3	2	—		15	5
Kremin Kremenchuk	Total		28	6	3	2	—		31	8
Dnipro Cherkasy	1999–2000	Ukrainian First League	4	0	—		—		4	0
Adoms Kremenchuk	1999–2000	Ukrainian Second League	10	1	—		—		10	1
Adoms Kremenchuk	2000–01	Ukrainian Second League	12	4	1	0	—		13	4
Adoms Kremenchuk	Total		22	5	1	0	—		23	5
Zirka Kirovohrad	2000–01	Ukrainian First League	15	2	—		—		15	2
Zirka Kirovohrad	2001–02	Ukrainian First League	22	1	1	0	—		23	1
Zirka Kirovohrad	2002–03	Ukrainian First League	15	3	2	0	—		17	3
Zirka Kirovohrad	Total		52	6	3	0	—		55	6
Kremin Kremenchuk	2003–04	Poltava Oblast Championship	4	1	—		—		4	1
Kremin Kremenchuk	Kremin total		111	19	13	4	—		124	23
Career total			407	72	20	4	—		427	76

== Honours ==
Alga

- Kyrgyz Premier League: 1992

Vorskla

- Ukrainian First League: 1995–96

Zirka

- Ukrainian First League: 2002–03

== Sources ==
- Lomov, Anatolii (2015), "Ворскла" (Полтава) в лицах, событиях, фактах. 1955-2015 ["Vorskla" (Poltava) in faces, events, facts. 1955-2015] (in Russian), Poltava: Dyvosvit, ISBN 978-617-633-116-2
