= 1985 KFK competitions (Ukraine) =

KFK competitions
- Season: 1985
- Champions: Naftovyk Okhtyrka

The 1985 KFK competitions in Ukraine were part of the 1985 Soviet KFK competitions that were conducted in the Soviet Union. It was 21st season of the KFK in Ukraine since its introduction in 1964. The winner eventually qualified to the 1986 Soviet Second League.

== First stage ==
=== Group 1 ===
Pos	Team	Pld	W	D	L	GF	GA	GD	Pts
1	Naftovyk Dolyna	14	11	1	2	36	12	+24	23
2	Nyva Berezhany	14	7	4	3	24	10	+14	18
3	Burevisnyk Kamianets-Podilskyi	14	6	2	6	16	14	+2	14
4	Keramik Mukachevo	14	8	3	3	17	11	+6	19
5	Karpaty Dubove	14	6	3	5	24	21	+3	15
6	Elektron Ivano-Frankivsk	14	6	2	6	21	18	+3	14
7	Lehmash Chernivtsi	14	2	2	10	9	24	−15	6
8	Avtomobilist Kopychentsi	14	0	3	11	8	41	−33	3

Source: ukr-football.org.ua

=== Group 2 ===
Pos	Team	Pld	W	D	L	GF	GA	GD	Pts
1	Spartak Sambir	12	8	2	2	26	9	+17	18
2	Prohres Berdychiv	12	5	4	3	17	14	+3	14
3	Sokil Haisyn	12	5	3	4	8	10	−2	13
4	LVVPU Lviv	12	3	5	4	18	17	+1	11
5	Silmash Kovel	12	3	5	4	13	17	−4	11
6	Temp Vinnytsia	12	2	4	6	12	16	−4	8
7	Papirnyk Malyn	12	2	3	7	10	23	−13	7

Source: ukr-football.org.ua

=== Group 3 ===
Pos	Team	Pld	W	D	L	GF	GA	GD	Pts
1	Naftovyk Okhtyrka	14	11	2	1	27	5	+22	24
2	Budivelnyk Prypiat	14	8	4	2	35	11	+24	20
3	Voskhod Kyiv	14	7	4	3	14	8	+6	18
4	Yavir Krasnopillia	14	6	1	7	9	15	−6	13
5	Bilshovyk Kyiv	14	5	1	8	13	29	−16	11
6	Silmash Bila Tserkva	14	4	2	8	11	13	−2	10
7	Lokomotyv Znamianka	14	4	0	10	14	31	−17	8
8	Shakhtar Oleksandriya	14	0	6	8	7	22	−15	6

Source: ukr-football.org.ua

=== Group 4 ===
Pos	Team	Pld	W	D	L	GF	GA	GD	Pts
1	Vorskla Poltava	14	11	2	1	37	10	+27	24
2	Shakhtar Dzerzhynsk	14	11	0	3	36	13	+23	22
3	Sula Lubny	14	5	6	3	17	17	0	16
4	Avanhard Lozova	14	5	5	4	28	15	+13	15
5	Dnipro Cherkasy	14	3	5	6	11	29	−18	11
6	Trudovi Rezervy Kharkiv	14	2	5	7	10	23	−13	9
7	Metalurh Yenakiieve	14	1	5	8	13	21	−8	7
8	Tiasmyn Smila	14	2	3	9	7	31	−24	7

Source: ukr-football.org.ua

=== Group 5 ===
Pos	Team	Pld	W	D	L	GF	GA	GD	Pts
1	Enerhiya Nova Kakhovka	18	13	3	2	35	11	+24	29
2	Illichivets Illichivsk	18	11	1	6	20	12	+8	23
3	Tytan Armyansk	18	9	3	6	36	19	+17	21
4	Frehat Pervomaisk	18	7	5	6	23	17	+6	19
5	Torpedo Melitopol	18	7	5	6	16	26	−10	19
6	Transformator Zaporizhia	18	6	4	8	19	19	0	16
7	Zavod imeni Ordzhonikidze Odesa	18	5	5	8	27	41	−14	15
8	Kolos Osokorivka	18	5	4	9	10	20	−10	14
9	Kolos Vasylkivka	0	-	-	-	-	-	—	0
10	Sudnobudivnyk Mykolaiv	0	-	-	-	-	-	—	0

Source: ukr-football.org.ua

=== Group 6 ===
Pos	Team	Pld	W	D	L	GF	GA	GD	Pts
1	Sokil Rovenky	14	8	5	1	25	9	+16	21
2	Bliuminh Kramatorsk	14	6	4	4	20	14	+6	16
3	Shakhtar Donetsk	14	6	4	4	12	11	+1	16
4	Hirnyk Pavlohrad	14	5	5	4	19	15	+4	15
5	Kirovets Makiivka	14	3	8	3	9	9	0	14
6	Shakhtar Sverdlovsk	14	4	3	7	16	24	−8	11
7	Komunarets Komunarsk	14	4	3	7	11	24	−13	11
8	Metalurh Kupiansk	14	3	4	7	8	12	−4	10

Source: ukr-football.org.ua

== Final ==
The finals took place in Krasnoperekopsk and Armyansk, both in Crimean Oblast.

Pos	Team	Pld	W	D	L	GF	GA	GD	Pts	Promotion
1	Naftovyk Okhtyrka	5	4	0	1	13	7	+6	8	Promoted to Second League
2	Spartak Sambir	5	3	1	1	10	5	+5	7	
3	Vorskla Poltava	5	3	1	1	8	3	+5	7	
4	Naftovyk Dolyna	5	2	1	2	7	9	−2	5	
5	Sokil Rovenky	5	1	0	4	6	9	−3	2	
6	Enerhiya Nova Kakhovka	5	0	1	4	4	15	−11	1	

Source: ukr-football.org.ua
