= 2000 Ukrainian Football Amateur League =

Ukrainian Football Amateur League
- Season: 2000
- Champions: HPZ Varva (1st title) FC Nizhyn (losing finalist)

2000 Amateur championship of Ukraine was the ninth amateur championship of Ukraine and the 37th since the establishment of championship among fitness clubs (KFK) in 1964.

There was introduced one more stage.

== Teams ==
=== Location map ===
Locations of team home grounds in the 1994-95 Ukrainian Championship among amateur teams

== First stage ==
=== Group 1 ===
Pos	Team	Pld	W	D	L	GF	GA	GD	Pts	Qualification
1	Tekhno-Tsentr Rohatyn	6	3	3	0	11	1	+10	12	joined Druha Liha
2	Kirovets Mohyliv-Podilsky	6	2	3	1	1	2	−1	9	Second stage
3	Naftovyk Boryslav	6	1	3	2	1	7	−6	6	Second stage
4	Dynamo-Orbita Kamianets-Podilsky	6	1	1	4	3	6	−3	4	

=== Group 2 ===
Pos	Team	Pld	W	D	L	GF	GA	GD	Pts	Qualification
1	Kovel	6	5	1	0	11	3	+8	16	Second stage
2	Metalist Zdolbuniv	6	4	0	2	12	10	+2	12	Second stage
3	Sokil Radyvyliv	6	1	1	4	1	11	−10	4	
4	Sokil Velyki Hayi	6	1	0	5	6	6	0	3	

=== Group 3 ===
Pos	Team	Pld	W	D	L	GF	GA	GD	Pts	Qualification
1	Systema-KKhP Cherniakhiv	8	3	5	0	9	6	+3	14	Second stage
2	Akademia Irpin	8	3	3	2	9	6	+3	12	Second stage
3	Dnipro Kyiv	8	3	2	3	10	10	0	11	
4	CSKA-3 Kyiv	8	2	3	3	9	12	−3	9	
5	Dinaz Vyshhorod	8	1	3	4	5	8	−3	6	

=== Group 4 ===
Pos	Team	Pld	W	D	L	GF	GA	GD	Pts	Qualification
1	KhPZ Varva	6	4	2	0	15	2	+13	14	Second stage
2	Nizhyn	6	3	1	2	11	7	+4	10	Second stage
3	Frunzenets-Liha-99 Sumy	6	3	1	2	11	10	+1	10	
4	Kremez	6	0	0	6	3	21	−18	0	

=== Group 5 ===
Pos	Team	Pld	W	D	L	GF	GA	GD	Pts	Qualification
1	Myrhorod	6	4	1	1	9	6	+3	13	Second stage
2	Artemida Kirovohrad	6	4	1	1	12	6	+6	13	Second stage
3	Arsenal-2 Kharkiv	6	3	0	3	7	7	0	9	
4	Kolos Chornobai	6	0	0	6	3	12	−9	0	

=== Group 6 ===
Pos	Team	Pld	W	D	L	GF	GA	GD	Pts	Qualification
1	Dnister Ovidiopol	6	6	0	0	14	4	+10	18	Second stage
2	Kolos Stepove	6	3	1	2	6	5	+1	10	Second stage
3	Batkivshchyna-KHZhRK Kryvyi Rih	6	2	1	3	11	11	0	7	
4	Herkules Novoukrayinka	6	0	0	6	6	17	−11	0	

=== Group 7 ===
Pos	Team	Pld	W	D	L	GF	GA	GD	Pts	Qualification
1	ZAlK Zaporizhia	6	4	2	0	10	4	+6	14	Second stage
2	SVKh-Danyka Simferopol	6	3	1	2	10	7	+3	10	Second stage
3	Dynamo Tsyurupinsk	6	0	4	2	2	6	−4	4	
4	Metalurh Komsomolske	6	0	3	3	2	17	−15	3	

=== Group 8 ===
Pos	Team	Pld	W	D	L	GF	GA	GD	Pts	Qualification
1	Monolit Kostiantynivka	8	5	2	1	15	9	+6	17	Second stage
2	Shakhta Ukrayina Ukrayinsk	8	4	3	1	20	12	+8	15	Second stage
3	Shakhtar Luhansk	8	2	3	3	14	19	−5	9	
4	Fortuna Shakhtarsk	8	2	1	5	13	16	−3	7	
5	Fahot-Vuhleremont Krasnyi Luch	8	2	1	5	10	16	−6	7	

== Second stage ==
=== Group 9 ===
Pos	Team	Pld	W	D	L	GF	GA	GD	Pts	Qualification
1	Naftovyk-SKA-Orbita Boryslav	6	5	0	1	12	2	+10	15	Final stage
2	Kovel	6	3	2	1	14	12	+2	11	Final stage
3	Systema-KKhP Cherniakhiv	6	1	2	3	8	10	−2	5	
4	Metalist Zdolbuniv	6	1	0	5	11	21	−10	3	

=== Group 10 ===
Pos	Team	Pld	W	D	L	GF	GA	GD	Pts	Qualification
1	Nizhyn	6	5	0	1	16	7	+9	15	Final stage
2	Kirovets Mohyliv-Podilsky	6	4	0	2	9	6	+3	12	Final stage
3	Myrhorod	6	2	1	3	9	5	+4	7	
4	Akademia Irpin	6	0	1	5	3	19	−16	1	

=== Group 11 ===
Pos	Team	Pld	W	D	L	GF	GA	GD	Pts	Qualification
1	KhPZ Varva	6	4	1	1	10	6	+4	13	Final stage
2	Kolos Stepove	6	3	0	3	11	13	−2	9	Final stage
3	Monolit Kostiantynivka	6	2	1	3	9	10	−1	7	
4	ZAlK Zaporizhia	6	1	2	3	7	8	−1	5	

=== Group 12 ===
Pos	Team	Pld	W	D	L	GF	GA	GD	Pts	Qualification
1	Dnister Ovidiopol	4	3	0	1	9	4	+5	9	Final stage
2	Artemida Kirovohrad	4	2	0	2	8	9	−1	6	Final stage
3	SVKh-Danyka Simferopol	4	1	0	3	6	10	−4	3	

== Final stage ==
The second stage was finals that took place in Nizhyn and Varva, Chernihiv Oblast on September 12–17, 2000.

=== Group A ===
Pos	Team	Pld	W	D	L	GF	GA	GD	Pts	Qualification
1	KhPZ Varva	3	2	1	0	7	3	+4	7	Final game
2	Naftovyk-SKA-Orbita Lviv	3	1	1	1	5	5	0	4	3rd place game
3	Artemida Kirovohrad	3	1	0	2	8	7	+1	3	5th place game
3	Kirovets Mohyliv-Podilsky	3	1	0	2	1	6	−5	3	

=== Group B ===
Pos	Team	Pld	W	D	L	GF	GA	GD	Pts	Qualification
1	Nizhyn	3	2	1	0	7	1	+6	7	Final game
2	Kovel	3	2	0	1	5	4	+1	6	3rd place game
3	Dnister Ovidiopol	3	1	1	1	5	4	+1	4	5th place game
3	Kolos Stepove	3	0	0	3	5	13	−8	0	

== Number of teams by region ==
Number	Region	Team(s)
4	Donetsk Oblast	Fortuna Shakhtarsk, Metalurh Komsomolske, Monolit Kostiantynivka, Shakhtar Ukraina Ukrainsk
2	Chernihiv Oblast	HPZ Varva, FC Nizhyn
2	Kirovohrad Oblast	Artemida Kirovohrad, Herkules Novoukrainka
2	Kyiv	CSKA-3, Dnipro
2	Kyiv Oblast	Dinaz Vyshhorod, UFEI Irpin
2	Luhansk Oblast	Fahot-Vuhleremont Krasnyi Luch, Shakhtar Luhansk
2	Poltava Oblast	Kremez Kremenchuk, FC Myrhorod
2	Rivne Oblast	Metalist Zdolbuniv, Sokil Radyvyliv
1	Autonomous Republic of Crimea	SVKh-Danyka Simferopol
1	Cherkasy Oblast	Kolos Chornobai
1	Dnipropetrovsk Oblast	Rodina-KZRK Kryvyi Rih
1	Ivano-Frankivsk Oblast	Tekhno-Tsentr Rohatyn
1	Kharkiv Oblast	Arsenal-2 Kharkiv
1	Kherson Oblast	Dynamo Tsyurupinsk
1	Khmelnytskyi Oblast	Dynamo-Orbita Kamianets-Podilskyi
1	Lviv Oblast	Naftovyk Boryslav
1	Mykolaiv Oblast	Kolos Stepove
1	Odesa Oblast	Dnister Ovidiopol
1	Sumy Oblast	Frunzenets Sumy
1	Ternopil Oblast	Sokil Velyki Hayi
1	Vinnytsia Oblast	Kirovets Mohyliv-Podilskyi
1	Volyn Oblast	FC Kovel
1	Zaporizhia Oblast	ZAlK Zaporizhia
1	Zhytomyr Oblast	KKhP Chernyakhiv
