= FC Kremez Kremenchuk =

Defunct professional football club based in Kremenchuk, Ukraine

Kremez Kremenchuk
- Founded: 2000
- Dissolved: 2003
- Ground: Polytechnic Stadium, Kremenchuk
- Capacity: 11,300
- Chairman: Volodymyr Popov

Football Club Kremez Kremenchuk (Ukrainian: ФК Кремез Кременчук; was a Ukrainian football team based in Kremenchuk, Ukraine.

== History ==
Team was formed on 20 June 2000. Volodymyr Popov, director of Kremenchuk City Milk Plant initiated the club creation and became clubs President. Stanislav Turchenko was appointed first manager. He signed players who he coached in youth leagues prior to his appointment.

In 2000 the club participated in Ukrainian Football Amateur League finishing last in their group. This forced the Club leadership to replace Turchenko with Anatoliy Skurskyi and Ihor Humeniuk. In March 2001 Club signed a contract with local sporting school 2 to train local players for the club. Players were also replaced. During the 2002 season, club finished forth in group B and advanced to second stage of the competition. Kremez failed to advance, finishing last in group three.

Kremez also participated in Poltava Oblast championship and Cup. During the 2000–01 season they finished third. For the next two seasons they finished second, while also losing in the Cup final in 2002–03.

After Volodymyr Popov left the Kremenchuk City Milk Plant in 2003, the team was disbanded. Club ceased to exist in 2008 as a legal entity.

== League and cup history ==
Season	Div.	Pos.	Pl.	W	D	L	GS	GA	P	Domestic Cup	Notes
2000	4th	4	6	0	0	6	3	21	0		Group 4
2002	4th	4	8	3	2	3	8	7	11		Group 4 (First Stage)
2002	4th	5	8	0	1	7	1	6	1		Group 3 (Second Stage)

== Managers ==
- (Ukraine) Stanislav Turchenko (2000–2001)
- (Ukraine) Anatolii Skurskyi (2001–2003)

== Honours ==
Poltava Oblast Champions

Runners-up (2): 2001-02, 2002-03

Poltava Oblast Cup

Runners-up (1): 2002-03

== Sources ==
- Lomov, Anatolii; Stadnychenko, Oleksandr (2009), 100 Років Полтавському Футболу [100 Years of Poltava Football] (in Ukrainian), Poltava: Poltava, ISBN 978-966-97035-0-7
