= Maksym Pashayev =

Ukrainian footballer (1988–2008)

Personal information
- Full name: Maksym Vahifovych Pashayev
- Date of birth: 4 January 1988
- Place of birth: Krasnyi Luch, Ukrainian SSR
- Date of death: 12 December 2008 (aged 20)
- Place of death: Hradyzk, Ukraine
- Height: 1.82 m (6 ft 0 in)
- Position: Defender

Youth career
- 2001–2004: Atlant Kremenchuk

Senior career*
Years	Team	Apps	(Gls)
2004–2008	Dnipro Dnipropetrovsk	17	(0)
2007–2008	→ Kryvbas Kryvyi Rih (loan)	29	(1)

International career
2003	Ukraine U15	5	(0)
2003–2004	Ukraine U16	16	(2)
2004–2005	Ukraine U17	17	(1)
2005–2006	Ukraine U18	17	(2)
2005–2006	Ukraine U19	14	(0)
2006–2008	Ukraine U21	22	(0)
- * Club domestic league appearances and goals

Maksym Vahifovych Pashayev (Ukrainian: Максим Вагіфович Пашаєв; 4 January 1988 – 12 December 2008) was a professional Ukrainian football defender of Azerbaijani origin who played for Dnipro Dnipropetrovsk in the Ukrainian Premier League. He died in a car accident in Hradyzk, Poltava Oblast, Ukraine.

== Career ==
He was born in Krasnyi Luch, Luhansk Oblast, Ukraine. He was the product of the Dnipro Dnipropetrovsk Youth school system. With new Dnipro head coach Volodymyr Bezsonov, Pashaiv established himself in the starting lineup of the main team.

When he died in a car accident, he was the captain of the Ukraine national under-21 football team captain. His twin brother Pavlo Pashayev is also a football player and plays for Azerbaijan national football team.
