= Andrii Nediak =

Ukrainian football defender (born 1963)

Personal information
- Full name: Andrii Dmytrovych Nediak
- Date of birth: 27 March 1963 (age 63)
- Place of birth: Kremenchuk, Ukrainian SSR
- Height: 1.86 m (6 ft 1 in)
- Position: Defender

Team information
- Current team: Kremin Kremenchuk

Youth career
- –1980: DYuSSh #2 Kremenchuk
- CYSS Kolos

Senior career*
Years	Team	Apps	(Gls)
1980	Naftovyk Kremenchuk	11	(0)
1980	Kolos Poltava	8	(0)
1981–1984	Metalist Kharkiv	4	(0)
1984	Mayak Kharkiv	0	(0)
1985	Vorskla Poltava	0	(0)
1989	Dynamo Bila Tserkva	27	(0)
1991	Kremin Kremenchuk	32	(0)
1992–1994	Naftokhimik Kremenchuk	73	(5)
- * Club domestic league appearances and goals

Andrii Nediak (Ukrainian: Андрій Дмитрович Недяк; born 27 March 1963) is a Ukrainian professional football defender who played for Vorskla and Naftokhimik Kremenchuk. Since 2005 he is the director for Ukrainian Second League club Kremin Kremenchuk.

== Early life ==
Nediak was born in Kremenchuk on 27 March 1963. From 1970 to 1980 he attended Kremenchuk school #25. He started playing football when he turned nine years old. During winter break in 1980, Nediak was selected as best defender during all soviet youth football tournament held in Dolyna. He was part of Kremenchuk youth football school #2 team. In 1984 Nediak began his conscription service in the Soviet Army. In 1991 he graduated from Kharkiv State Academy of Physical Culture as a Physical education teacher and a football coach.

== Club history ==
Nediak played for Naftovyk Kremenchuk in the KFK competition of Ukrainian SSR in 1980. He made his debut in a 2–0 home victory against Lokomotyv Smila on May 2. He played in eleven matches during the season. While playing for Naftovyk, Nediak also began playing for Kolos Poltava. He made his debut in a 1–1 home draw against SKA Kyiv on May 2. He took part in eight matches. Nediak played for Metalist during 1981–1984. Part of 1984 he spent in Maiak where he managed to play in four matches. In March 1985 he rejoined Vorskla Poltava. Next season he moved to Kremin Kremenchuk playing in the KFK competition of Ukrainian SSR. He played an unknown number of games while scoring two goals. He remained with the club and earned silver medals for finishing second during the 1987 KFK season. He also played in Poltava Oblast competition where his team earned silver medals. His performance was rewarded by being named in team of the season. During the next season Nediak won the gold medals for the 1988 KFK season. He left Kremin in early part of 1989. Kremin coaches didn't want to use him and Nediak expressed interest in joining Vorskla Poltava, however V. Mankovskyi the head of Kremenchuk city football and sports committee prevented that move. He joined Dynamo Bila Tserkva and played for twenty-seven matches. In 1991 Nediak returned to play for Kremin. He played in thirty matches. Nediak left Kremin to join Naftokhimik in early part of 1992. In his first season he won the Poltava Oblast Championship, Cup and Kremenchuk city cup. He also played and won gold medals in the Ukrainian First futsal League. He was a team captain during his time with the club. In the 1992–93 Ukrainian Transitional League he became a champion and helped his team gain promotion to the Second League. During his three years at the club Nediak played in seventy-three league matches and scored five league goals. During the 1994–95 season Nediak played for KrAZ Kremenchuk where he earned silver medals and was included in the team of the season. At age thirty one Nediak retired from playing football.

== Career statistics ==
As of 30 September 2009

Club	Season	League		Cup		Total	
Club	Season	Apps	Goals	Apps	Goals	Apps	Goals
Naftovyk Kremenchuk	1980	11	0	0	0	11	0
Naftovyk Kremenchuk	Total	11	0	0	0	11	0
Kolos Poltava	1980	8	0	0	0	8	0
Kolos Poltava	Total	8	0	0	0	8	0
Metalist Kharkiv	1981	0	0	0	0	0	0
Metalist Kharkiv	1982	4	0	3	0	7	0
Metalist Kharkiv	1983	0	0	0	0	0	0
Metalist Kharkiv	1984	0	0	0	0	0	0
Metalist Kharkiv	Total	4	0	3	0	7	0
Mayak Kharkiv	1984	0	0	0	0	0	0
Mayak Kharkiv	Total	0	0	0	0	0	0
Vorskla Poltava	1985	0	0	0	0	0	0
Vorskla Poltava	Total	0	0	0	0	0	0
Dynamo Bila Tserkva	1989	27	0	0	0	27	0
Dynamo Bila Tserkva	Total	27	0	0	0	27	0
Kremin Kremenchuk	1991						
Kremin Kremenchuk	Total	32	0	0	0	32	0
Naftokhimik Kremenchuk	1992–93	27	0	1	0	28	0
Naftokhimik Kremenchuk	1993–94	34	5	4	0	39	5
Naftokhimik Kremenchuk	1994–95	12	0	3	0	15	0
Naftokhimik Kremenchuk	Total	73	5	8	0	81	5
Career	Total	144	5	11	0	155	5

== Honours ==
Kremin Kremenchuk

- KFK competition of Ukrainian SSR winners: 1988
- KFK competition of Ukrainian SSR runner-up: 1987
- Poltava Oblast Championship runner-up: 1987

KrAZ Kremenchuk

- Poltava Oblast Championship runner-up: 1994–95

== Sources ==
- Pyrukhin, Yurii (n.d.a), 1971-1982 Вторая лига "Колос" ("Строитель") Полтава Футбол [1971-1982 Second League "Kolos" ("Builder") Poltava Football] (in Russian), Kremenchuk
- Pyrukhin, Yurii (n.d.b), Энциклопедия кременчугского футбола [Encyclopedia of Kremenchuk football] (in Russian), Kremenchuk
- Pyrukhin, Yurii (n.d.c), Кремень Кременчуг 1986 [Kremin Kremenchuk 1986] (in Ukrainian), Kremenchuk
- Pyrukhin, Yurii (n.d.d), Кремень Кременчуг 1987 [Kremin Kremenchuk 1987] (in Ukrainian), Kremenchuk
- Pyrukhin, Yurii (n.d.e), Кремень Кременчуг 1988 [Kremin Kremenchuk 1988] (in Ukrainian), Kremenchuk
- Lomov, Anatolii; Kryvorotko, Serhii (2010), Энциклопедия Полтавского Футбола (1909-2010) [Encyclopedia of Poltava Football (1909-2010)] (in Russian), Poltava: OOO "ASMI", ISBN 978-966-182-118-6
- Pyrukhin, Yurii (n.d.f), Нефтехимик Кременчуг 1992-1996 [Naftokhimik Kremenchuk 1992-1996] (in Ukrainian), Kremenchuk
