= Ruslan Zarubin =

Ukrainian footballer

Personal information
- Full name: Ruslan Oleksandrovych Zarubin
- Date of birth: 21 March 1983 (age 43)
- Place of birth: Kharkiv, Ukrainian SSR, Soviet Union
- Height: 1.86 m (6 ft 1 in)
- Position: Goalkeeper

Youth career
- 1999-2000: Arsenal Kharkiv

Senior career*
Years	Team	Apps	(Gls)
2000	Arsenal 2 Kharkiv	0	(0)
2002	Fakel-Voronezh-2	?	(?)
2003–2006	Hazovyk-KhGV Kharkiv	35	(0)
2006–2007	Knyazha Shchaslyve	12	(0)
2007–2008	Arsenal Kharkiv	34	(0)
2008–2010	Poltava	55	(0)
2010–2012	Helios Kharkiv	47	(0)
2012–2014	Oleksandriya	39	(0)
2014–2015	Hirnyk Kryvyi Rih	13	(0)
2015–2016	Helios Kharkiv	14	(0)
2017	Vorkuta	?	(?)
2018	Metalist 1925 Kharkiv	0	(0)
2018–2021	Viktoriya Mykolaivka	47	(0)
- * Club domestic league appearances and goals as of 15 July 2021

Ruslan Zarubin (born March 21, 1983) is a Ukrainian retired footballer.

== Career ==
Zarubin began his career in 2003 in the Ukrainian Second League with FC Hazovyk-KhGV Kharkiv. Throughout his time in the Second League he played with FC Knyazha Shchaslyve, FC Arsenal Kharkiv, and FC Poltava. In 2010, he played in the Ukrainian First League with FC Helios Kharkiv. He also had stints with FC Hirnyk Kryvyi Rih, and FC Oleksandriya.In 2015, he returned to play with Helios Kharkiv. He went abroad in 2017 to play in the Canadian Soccer League with FC Vorkuta. In his debut season he assisted in securing the regular season title.

== Military career ==
He enlisted in the Ukrainian National Guard during the 2022 Russian invasion of Ukraine.
