= Oleg Kazmirchuk =

Kyrgyzstani and Ukrainian footballer

Oleh Kazmyrchuk
Personal information
- Full name: Oleh Vasylyovych Kazmyrchuk
- Date of birth: 4 December 1968 (age 57)
- Place of birth: Kyrgyz SSR
- Height: 1.81 m (5 ft 11 1/2 in)
- Position: Midfielder

Senior career*
| Years | Team | Apps | (Gls) |
| 1985–1986 | FC Tselinnik Tselinograd | 32 | (1) |
| 1987–1992 | FC Alga Frunze | 137 | (15) |
| 1992–1993 | PFC Haskovo | 4 | (0) |
| 1993–1995 | FC Kremin Kremenchuk | 57 | (3) |
| 1996 | FC Naftokhimik Kremenchuk | 13 | (0) |
| 1996–1997 | FC Nyva Ternopil | 14 | (0) |
| 1997 | FC Cherkasy | 1 | (0) |
| 2002 | FC Akzhayik Astana | 0 | (0) |

International career^{‡}
| 1992 | Kyrgyzstan | 2 | (1) |
- * Club domestic league appearances and goals as of 15 May 2010 ‡ National team caps and goals as of 15 May 2010

Oleh Vasylyovych Kazmyrchuk (Ukrainian: Олег Васильович Казьмирчук) (born on 4 December 1968) was a Kyrgyzstani and Ukrainian footballer who was a midfielder for FC Akzhayik Astana. He was a member of the Kyrgyzstan national football team, earning two caps in 1992.
