= FC PZMS Poltava =

Defunct professional football club based in Poltava, Ukraine

PZMS Poltava
- Founded: 1999
- Dissolved: 2006
- Ground: Lokomotyv Stadium, Poltava
- Owner: Poltava Medical Glass Factory
- Chairman: Oleksandr Kudatskyi
- Manager: Serhii Lukash

Football Club PZMS Poltava (Ukrainian: ФК ПМЗС Полтава) was a Ukrainian football team based in Poltava, Ukraine.

== History ==
In mid 1980s a football team Krystal was created at the Poltava Medical Glass Factory on Kostiantyn Opalenko initiative. It played in Poltava city championship until 1992 without any success. That season they finished seventh in second group.

In 1999 when the factory was a public joint-stock company, one of its directors wanted to recreate a football team. Oleksandr Kudatskyi began the work to create the team in time for the Poltava Oblast championship. The club took part in Second League Second Zone (South). They advanced to the final part of the competition where they finished third. Club also took part in Kolos sport society cup "Zolotyi Kolos" where they advanced to quarter finals after defeating Plemservis Lubny. Next year they finished first in Second League First Zone (North) and advanced to the final part. The club again finished third. In the city championship they finished tenth. During the 2001–02 season, the club finished fifth in the city competition. They again fished top of the Second League North Zone and won promotion to First league. During the 2002–03 season in the new league, the club finished fourth. In the city championship they finished fifth. In the city cup, the club finished second in group B. They lost in the semifinal to SKA Polimpeks. Before the start of 2003–04 season the club leased Lokomotyv Stadium in Poltava for six years. They took part in "Spring-2003" cup completion in Poltava. The club won all their group games and advanced to the final which they won. During the season the club earned bronze medals in the championship. They finished second in the city competition and won the city cup. During 2004 the club in twenty-three official matches lost only once scoring ninety-nine goals. They won the futsal cup and "Spring-2004" cup. They won the city championship and cup. In the championship they finished second and won the cup. They also won the 2005 city cup championship, where they also fielded their second team that finished fourth. During the 2005–06 championship the club finished third. In the Oblast cup, they lost to Lubny in the final. They won the city cup in 2006. The club did not take part in the city championship. At the end of the 2006 the club was dissolved.

== Honours ==
Poltava Oblast Championship 'First League'

Runners-up (1): 2004–05
Third place (2): 2003–04, 2005–06

'Second League (North Zone)'

Winners (2): 2000–01, 2001–02
Third place (1): 1999–2000

Poltava Oblast Cup

Winners (1): 2005
Runners-up (1): 2006

Poltava Championship

Winners (2): 2004, 2005
Runners-up (2): 2003

Poltava Cup

Winners (1): 2003, 2004, 2005, 2006

== Managers ==
- Iraklii Petrov (2001–2002)
- Serhii Lukash (2003–2006)

== Sources ==
- Lomov, Anatolii; Stadnychenko, Oleksandr (2009), 100 Років Полтавському Футболу [100 Years of Poltava Football] (in Ukrainian), Poltava: Poltava, ISBN 978-966-97035-0-7
- Lomov, Anatolii; Kryvorotko, Serhii (2010), Энциклопедия Полтавского Футбола (1909-2010) [Encyclopedia of Poltava Football (1909-2010)] (in Russian), Poltava: OOO "ASMI", ISBN 978-966-182-118-6
- Lomov, Anatolii; Kryvyi, Anatolii (2013), Полтава футбольная от А до Я ( 1909 - 2013) [Poltava football club from A to Z (1909 - 2013)] (in Russian), Poltava: PP Dyvosvit, ISBN 978-617-633-067-7
- Klykovskyi, Serhii (2010), Лубенському футболу 90 років [90 Years of Football in Lubny] (in Ukrainian), Lubny
