= Andrii Oliinyk =

Ukrainian footballer

Personal information
- Full name: Andrii Olehovych Oliinyk
- Date of birth: 16 January 1986 (age 40)
- Place of birth: Bila Tserkva, Ukraine
- Height: 1.83 m (6 ft 0 in)
- Position: Goalkeeper

Youth career
- 2000–2001: Borysfen Schaslyve
- 2001–2003: Atlant-Kremez Kremenchuk

Senior career*
Years	Team	Apps	(Gls)
2004–2020	Kremin Kremenchuk	207	(0)
Total		207	(0)
- * Club domestic league appearances and goals

Andrii Oliinyk (Ukrainian: Андрій Олегович Олійник; born 16 January 1986) is a Ukrainian football goalkeeper currently playing for Ukrainian Second League club Kremin.

== Club history ==
Andrii Oliinyk signed with FC Kremin Kremenchuk during 2004 summer transfer window.

== Career statistics ==
As of 17 September 2009

Club	Season	League		Cup		Total	
Club	Season	Apps	Goals	Apps	Goals	Apps	Goals
Kremin	2005–06	22	1	0	0	23	0
Kremin	2006–07	12	1	0	0	13	0
Kremin	2007–08	2	0	0	0	2	0
Kremin	2008–09	14	1	0	0	15	0
Kremin	2009–10	1	0	0	0	1	0
Kremin	Total	51	3	0	0	54	0
Career	Total	51	3	0	0	54	0
