= 2003–04 Football Championship of Poltava Oblast =

Football Championship of Poltava Oblast
- Season: 2003–04
- Dates: 17 August 2003 – 18 June 2004
- Champions: Kremin Kremenchuk
- Top goalscorer: Oleksandr Solnyshin (11)

The 2003–04 Football Championship of Poltava Oblast began on 17 August 2003 and ended on 18 June 2004. FC ZemliaK Myrhorod were the defending champions. Kremin Kremenchuk won their second League title.

== Summary ==
The Championship was divided into two leagues with thirty-two teams. Two teams from first league were relegated to the second league. Two teams from each group of second league played in play-off matches for promotion. Poltava was represented by five teams, Kremenchuk, Lubny, Zinkiv Raion, Chutove Raion, Kotelva Raion, Kobeliaky Raion and Shyshaky Raion were represented by two or three. Last season Second League champion SKA-Bydivelnyk from Poltava withdrew due to lack of finances. Before the season began, three teams announced their aim was to move up to the professional league. They were FC ZemliaK Myrhorod, Kremin Kremenchuk and Lubny. After the first half of championship league leaders were PZMS Poltava who represented Poltava Medical Glass Factory. Both Kremin and ZemliaK were four points behind. Kremin played very well in the second half and won the championship. ZemliaK Myrhorod finished with a better goal difference and were awarded silver medals while PZMS Poltava were awarded bronze.

== First League ==
=== Table ===
Pos	Team	Pld	W	D	L	GF	GA	GD	Pts	
1	Kremin Kremenchuk (C)	16	12	2	2	53	7	+46	38	Champion
2	ZemliaK Myrhorod	16	10	5	1	33	11	+22	35	Silver Medals
3	PZMS Poltava	16	10	5	1	27	14	+13	35	Bronze Medals
4	Lubny	16	7	7	2	39	18	+21	28	
5	Psel Hadiach	16	5	2	9	18	32	−14	17	
6	Molod-PedUniversytet	16	4	4	8	27	32	−5	16	
7	Pyriatyn	16	5	0	11	21	44	−23	15	
8	Lokomotyv Hrebinka (Note: Second round matches against Locomotyv were awarded as a technical win, as they withdrew from competition.) (W)	16	3	1	12	15	18	−3	10	Withdrawn
9	DYuFSh Vorskla Poltava	16	3	0	13	6	63	−57	9	

Source: fcvorskla.com.ua
(C) Champions; (W) Withdrawn

=== Goalscorers ===
Oleksandr Solnyshin was the top scorer in the First League with eleven goals.

== Second League ==
=== Group A ===
Group was composed of Zoria Hoholeve, Metalist Khorol, Hirnyk-Metalurh Kremenchuk, Olimpia Orzhytsia, Nika Lubny, FC Hlobyne, Budivelnyk Shyshaky, Avanhard Yaresky, Vorskla-Hazovyk Opishne and Kolos Zinkiv. Hirnyk-Metalurh Kremenchuk won the promotion to First League.

=== Group B ===
Group was composed of Standart Novi Sanzhary, Kolos Kobeliaky, Arsenal Kobeliaky, Promin Karlivka, Kolos Kotelva, Kharchovyk Artemivka, Nyva Filenkove and Hazovyk Bazylevshvhyna.

== Sources ==
- Lomov, Anatolii; Stadnychenko, Oleksandr (2009), 100 Років Полтавському Футболу [100 Years of Poltava Football] (in Ukrainian), Poltava: Poltava, ISBN 978-966-97035-0-7
- Lomov, Anatolii; Kryvorotko, Serhii (2010), Энциклопедия Полтавского Футбола (1909-2010) [Encyclopedia of Poltava Football (1909-2010)] (in Russian), Poltava: OOO "ASMI", ISBN 978-966-182-118-6
