= 1986 Soviet Second League =

Second League
- Season: 1986

1986 Soviet Second League was a Soviet competition in the Soviet Second League.

== Zonal tournament ==
=== Zone I [Russian Federation] ===
Pos	Team	Pld	W	D	L	GF	GA	GD	Pts
1	Krasnaya Presnya Moskva	30	19	7	4	62	19	+43	45
2	Arsenal Tula	30	17	7	6	39	19	+20	41
3	Zarya Kaluga	30	16	8	6	51	24	+27	40
4	Znamya Truda Orekhovo-Zuyevo	30	17	5	8	52	30	+22	39
5	Zorkiy Krasnogorsk	30	17	5	8	51	34	+17	39
6	Textilshchik Ivanovo	30	15	9	6	41	23	+18	39
7	Spartak Kostroma	30	13	10	7	45	34	+11	36
8	Dinamo Vologda	30	11	9	10	35	32	+3	31
9	Volzhanin Kineshma	30	11	8	11	35	33	+2	30
10	FSM Moskva	30	11	3	16	34	49	−15	25
11	Saturn Rybinsk	30	8	8	14	22	38	−16	24
12	Torpedo Vladimir	30	7	9	14	30	39	−9	23
13	Volga Kalinin	30	6	10	14	22	34	−12	22
14	Spartak Ryazan	30	8	4	18	23	45	−22	20
15	CSKA-2 Moskva	30	4	7	19	24	53	−29	15
16	Dinamo-2 Moskva	30	4	3	23	14	74	−60	11

=== Zone II [Russian Federation] ===
Pos	Team	Pld	W	D	L	GF	GA	GD	Pts
1	Krylya Sovetov Kuibyshev	32	21	4	7	55	27	+28	46
2	Zenit Izhevsk	32	18	10	4	49	22	+27	46
3	Zvezda Perm	32	17	8	7	47	23	+24	42
4	UralMash Sverdlovsk	32	15	11	6	55	38	+17	41
5	Rubin Kazan	32	16	8	8	50	33	+17	40
6	Khimik Dzerzhinsk	32	15	10	7	36	22	+14	40
7	Torpedo Togliatti	32	14	4	14	43	43	0	32
8	Dinamo Kirov	32	9	12	11	37	39	−2	30
9	Torpedo Kurgan	32	11	6	15	20	32	−12	28
10	Uralets Nizhniy Tagil	32	9	10	13	34	43	−9	28
11	Metallurg Magnitogorsk	32	11	5	16	41	50	−9	27
12	Svetotekhnika Saransk	32	11	5	16	30	44	−14	27
13	Stal Cheboksary	32	8	10	14	31	44	−13	26
14	Lokomotiv Chelyabinsk	32	8	9	15	31	43	−12	25
15	Gastello Ufa	32	7	11	14	28	37	−9	25
16	Turbina Naberezhnyye Chelny	32	8	6	18	27	45	−18	22
17	Druzhba Yoshkar-Ola	32	6	7	19	28	57	−29	19

Notes:

Match for 1st place [Oct 19, Novorossiysk]

Krylya Sovetov Kuibyshev  0-0 Zenit Izhevsk  [pen 5-4]

=== Zone III [Russian Federation] ===
Pos	Team	Pld	W	D	L	GF	GA	GD	Pts
1	Sokol Saratov	32	20	8	4	67	28	+39	48
2	Druzhba Maykop	32	20	3	9	59	36	+23	43
3	Uralan Elista	32	19	4	9	51	36	+15	42
4	Atommash Volgodonsk	32	19	3	10	83	43	+40	41
5	Terek Grozny	32	17	6	9	49	21	+28	40
6	Torpedo Taganrog	32	18	3	11	54	33	+21	39
7	Spartak Nalchik	32	15	8	9	44	27	+17	38
8	Lokomotiv Mineralnyye Vody	32	14	8	10	41	45	−4	36
9	Mashuk Pyatigorsk	32	14	5	13	59	45	+14	33
10	Cement Novorossiysk	32	11	10	11	38	41	−3	32
11	Nart Cherkessk	32	11	10	11	51	49	+2	32
12	Torpedo Volzhskiy	32	11	6	15	39	44	−5	28
13	Volgar Astrakhan	32	7	9	16	37	59	−22	23
14	Dinamo Makhachkala	32	9	4	19	36	74	−38	22
15	Salyut Belgorod	32	5	9	18	28	61	−33	19
16	Start Ulyanovsk	32	2	11	19	22	66	−44	15
17	Atom Novovoronezh	32	5	3	24	18	68	−50	13

=== Zone IV [Russian Federation] ===
Pos	Team	Pld	W	D	L	GF	GA	GD	Pts
1	Geolog Tyumen	26	16	9	1	47	20	+27	41
2	Irtysh Omsk	26	16	8	2	51	20	+31	40
3	Dinamo Barnaul	26	14	6	6	53	26	+27	34
4	Zvezda Irkutsk	26	13	5	8	39	31	+8	31
5	Okean Nakhodka	26	8	11	7	23	21	+2	27
6	Amur Blagoveshchensk	26	8	9	9	16	20	−4	25
7	Torpedo Rubtsovsk	26	8	8	10	31	38	−7	24
8	Metallurg Novokuznetsk	26	10	3	13	32	39	−7	23
9	Lokomotiv Chita	26	6	10	10	16	29	−13	22
10	Selenga Ulan-Ude	26	8	5	13	22	34	−12	21
11	Amur Komsomolsk-na-Amure	26	6	8	12	29	38	−9	20
12	Manometr Tomsk	26	6	7	13	20	27	−7	19
13	Luch Vladivostok	26	4	11	11	15	32	−17	19
14	Avtomobilist Krasnoyarsk	26	5	8	13	21	40	−19	18

=== Zone V (Soviet Republics) ===
Pos	Rep	Team	Pld	W	D	L	GF	GA	GD	Pts
1	RUS	Metallurg Lipetsk	30	19	5	6	48	19	+29	43
2	MDA	Textilshchik Tiraspol (Note: Avtomobilist Tiraspol changed name to Textilshchik.)	30	17	5	8	47	29	+18	39
3	RUS	Avangard Kursk	30	16	7	7	36	29	+7	39
4	RUS	Spartak Tambov	30	15	7	8	41	28	+13	37
5	BLR	Dnepr Mogilyov	30	15	5	10	56	31	+25	35
6	BLR	Khimik Grodno	30	14	7	9	37	30	+7	35
7	BLR	Dinamo Brest	30	15	3	12	41	31	+10	33
8	BLR	GomSelMash Gomel	30	11	9	10	36	39	−3	31
9	RUS	Spartak Oryol	30	11	8	11	32	32	0	30
10	EST	Sport Tallinn	30	10	9	11	33	32	+1	29
11	LVA	Zvejnieks Liepaja	30	7	14	9	42	46	−4	28
12	RUS	Dinamo Bryansk	30	8	9	13	37	43	−6	25
13	RUS	Baltika Kaliningrad	30	9	6	15	34	45	−11	24
14	MDA	Zarya Beltsy	30	7	10	13	20	35	−15	24
15	RUS	Dinamo Leningrad	30	7	4	19	26	59	−33	18
16	BLR	Vityaz Vitebsk	30	2	6	22	19	57	−38	10

=== Zone VI [Ukraine] ===
For places 1-14 

Pos	Team	Pld	W	D	L	GF	GA	GD	Pts	Qualification
1	Zorya Voroshylovhrad(C) (Q)	40	25	10	5	69	35	+34	60	Qualified for interzonal competitions among other Zone winners
2	Tavriya Simferopol	40	22	15	3	102	46	+56	59	
3	SKA Kyiv	40	20	9	11	65	42	+23	49	
4	Nyva Ternopil	40	17	14	9	53	38	+15	48	
5	Torpedo Lutsk	40	19	9	12	50	39	+11	47	
6	Kryvbas Kryvyi Rih	40	16	13	11	58	48	+10	45	
7	Nyva Vinnytsia	40	17	9	14	44	44	0	43	
8	Podillya Khmelnytskyi	40	16	11	13	64	50	+14	43	
9	Torpedo Zaporizhzhia	40	17	7	16	49	47	+2	41	
10	Zakarpattia Uzhhorod	40	16	9	15	50	49	+1	41	
11	Avanhard Rivne	40	16	9	15	46	44	+2	41	
12	Sudobudivnyk Mykolaiv	40	14	13	13	49	39	+10	41	
13	SKA Odesa	40	14	9	17	39	44	−5	37	
14	Okean Kerch	40	14	4	22	46	63	−17	32	

=== Zone VII (Central Asia) ===
Pos	Rep	Team	Pld	W	D	L	GF	GA	GD	Pts
1	UZB	Sohibkor Halkabad	36	23	4	9	62	32	+30	50
2	UZB	Neftyanik Fergana	36	20	9	7	66	31	+35	49
3	UZB	Dinamo Samarkand	36	20	9	7	63	31	+32	49
4	UZB	Pahtakor Andizhan	36	22	4	10	55	29	+26	48
5	UZB	Avtomobilist Namangan	36	17	10	9	51	35	+16	44
6	UZB	Kasansayets Kasansay	36	19	5	12	57	42	+15	43
7	UZB	Hiva	36	16	8	12	47	42	+5	40
8	TJK	Hojent Leninabad	36	15	8	13	60	64	−4	38
9	UZB	Horezm Yangiaryk	36	13	10	13	36	35	+1	36
10	UZB	Tselinnik Turtkul	36	14	7	15	38	45	−7	35
11	UZB	Surhan Termez	36	14	5	17	43	48	−5	33
12	UZB	Zarafshan Navoi	36	12	7	17	37	43	−6	31
13	KGZ	Alay Osh	36	12	7	17	43	53	−10	31
14	UZB	Yeshlik Jizak (Note: Zvezda Jizak changed name to Yeshlik.)	36	10	10	16	38	50	−12	30
15	KGZ	Alga Frunze	36	9	10	17	42	55	−13	28
16	TJK	Vakhsh Kurgan-Tyube	36	10	7	19	38	57	−19	27
17	UZB	Shakhtyor Angren	36	10	7	19	38	59	−21	27
18	UZB	Yangiyer	36	10	4	22	38	69	−31	24
19	UZB	Geolog Karshi	36	8	5	23	32	64	−32	21

=== Zone VIII [Kazakhstan] ===
Pos	Team	Pld	W	D	L	GF	GA	GD	Pts
1	Meliorator Chimkent	28	19	5	4	63	28	+35	43
2	Khimik Jambul	28	18	2	8	46	22	+24	38
3	Tselinnik Tselinograd	28	17	4	7	40	23	+17	38
4	Energetik Kustanay	28	14	9	5	43	29	+14	37
5	Shakhtyor Karaganda	28	16	4	8	45	29	+16	36
6	Spartak Semipalatinsk	28	14	5	9	48	34	+14	33
7	Aktyubinets Aktyubinsk	28	13	4	11	28	29	−1	30
8	Traktor Pavlodar	28	10	6	12	34	35	−1	26
9	Zhetysu Taldy-Kurgan	28	10	3	15	49	62	−13	23
10	Vostok Ust-Kamenogorsk	28	8	6	14	40	48	−8	22
11	Meliorator Kzil-Orda	28	8	6	14	32	38	−6	22
12	Ekibastuzets Ekibastuz	28	8	6	14	37	46	−9	22
13	Torpedo Kokchetav	28	10	1	17	30	56	−26	21
14	Jezkazganets Jezkazgan	28	6	4	18	35	56	−21	16
15	SKIF Alma-Ata	28	5	3	20	30	65	−35	13

=== Zone IX (Caucasus) ===
Pos	Rep	Team	Pld	W	D	L	GF	GA	GD	Pts
1	AZE	Kyapaz Kirovabad	30	21	4	5	68	26	+42	46
2	GEO	Dinamo Sukhumi	30	18	3	9	52	33	+19	39
3	GEO	Dila Gori	30	16	4	10	44	37	+7	36
4	GEO	Kolkheti Poti	30	16	2	12	53	48	+5	34
5	ARM	Spartak Oktemberyan	30	14	5	11	39	37	+2	33
6	AZE	Gyanjlik Baku	30	14	5	11	44	29	+15	33
7	GEO	Lokomotiv Samtredia	30	13	6	11	43	40	+3	32
8	AZE	Avtomobilist Mingechaur	30	14	3	13	58	41	+17	31
9	AZE	Karabakh Stepanakert	30	14	2	14	56	48	+8	30
10	GEO	Metallurg Rustavi	30	13	4	13	47	44	+3	30
11	AZE	Araz Nahichevan	30	12	6	12	33	47	−14	30
12	GEO	Meshakhte Tkibuli	30	11	6	13	34	42	−8	28
13	TKM	Kolhozchi Ashkhabad	30	10	3	17	29	42	−13	23
14	GEO	Lokomotiv Tbilisi	30	9	5	16	25	44	−19	23
15	ARM	Shirak Leninakan	30	9	3	18	25	40	−15	21
16	ARM	Olimpia Artashat	30	4	3	23	21	73	−52	11

== Zone Finals ==
=== Group 1 ===
Pos	Rep	Team	Pld	W	D	L	GF	GA	GD	Pts	Promotion
1	RUS	Krylya Sovetov Kuibyshev	4	3	1	0	4	1	+3	7	Promoted
2	AZE	Kyapaz Kirovabad	4	1	1	2	4	11	−7	3	
3	RUS	Krasnaya Presnya Moskva	4	1	0	3	9	5	+4	2	

=== Group 2 ===
Pos	Rep	Team	Pld	W	D	L	GF	GA	GD	Pts	Promotion
1	RUS	Geolog Tyumen	4	3	0	1	4	1	+3	6	Promoted
2	RUS	Metallurg Lipetsk	4	2	0	2	6	3	+3	4	
3	KAZ	Meliorator Chimkent	4	1	0	3	2	8	−6	2	

=== Group 3 ===
Pos	Rep	Team	Pld	W	D	L	GF	GA	GD	Pts	Promotion
1	UKR	Zarya Voroshilovgrad	4	3	0	1	8	5	+3	6	Promoted
2	UZB	Sohibkor Halkabad	4	2	0	2	6	9	−3	4	
3	RUS	Sokol Saratov	4	1	0	3	8	8	0	2	

Source: rsssf.com
