= Oleh Horyslavets =

Ukrainian footballer

Oleh Horyslavets Олег Гориславець
Personal information
- Full name: Oleh Mykhaylovych Horyslavets
- Date of birth: 15 May 1983 (age 43)
- Place of birth: Kremenchuk, Soviet Union
- Height: 1.86 m (6 ft 1 in)
- Position: Defender

Team information
- Current team: FC Kremin Kremenchuk
- Number: 2

Senior career*
Years	Team	Apps	(Gls)
1999–2004	FC Kremin Kremenchuk		
2004–2006	MFC Olexandria		
2006–	FC Kremin Kremenchuk		
- * Club domestic league appearances and goals

Oleh Horyslavets (Ukrainian: Олег Гориславець) was born on 15 May 1983 in Kremenchuk, Ukraine) and is a Ukrainian football defender. He is 1.86 m (6 ft 1 in) tall. He weighs 75 kg (165 lb).

== Club history ==
He has played for FC Kremin Kremenchuk franchise since 1999. In 2004, he transferred to MFC Olexandria. In 2006, he came back to play for Kremin again.
