= Dmytro Pryma =

Ukrainian footballer

Personal information
- Full name: Dmytro Anatoliovych Pryma
- Date of birth: 13 March 1985 (age 41)
- Place of birth: Kiev, Soviet Union
- Position: Forward

Youth career
- 1998–2002: Dynamo Youth / Dynamo-2 Kyiv

Senior career*
Years	Team	Apps	(Gls)
2002	Dynamo-3 Kyiv	2	(0)
2003	Borysfen-2 Boryspil	4	(0)
2003–2005	Vorskla-2 Poltava	29	(3)
2005–2007	Kremin Kremenchuk	50	(7)
2007	Poltava	16	(2)
2008	CSKA Kyiv	5	(1)
2009	Stal Dniprodzerzhynsk	24	(7)
2010	Yednist Plysky	15	(4)
2011–2012	Dinaz Vyshhorod (amateur)	9	(0)
2016–2017	Desna Pohreby (amateur)	12	(3)
2018–2019	Dinaz Vyshhorod (amateur)	16	(3)
2019	Dinaz Vyshhorod	2	(0)
- * Club domestic league appearances and goals

Dmytro Anatoliovych Pryma (Ukrainian: Дмитро Анатолійович Прима; born 13 March 1985) is a Ukrainian former football forward.

== Club history ==
Dmytro Pryma began his football career in Dynamo Youth in Kiev.
