= FC Zirka-2 Kropyvnytskyi =

FC Zirka-2 Kropyvnytskyi was a Ukrainian football team based in Kropyvnytskyi, Ukraine. The club has been featured regularly in the Ukrainian Second Division it serves as a junior team for the FC Zirka Kropyvnytskyi franchise. Like most tributary teams, the best players are sent up to the senior team, meanwhile developing other players for further call-ups. The Zirka Kropyvnytskyi U21 club played during 2018 and won the Group II championship.
