= FC Myrhorod =

FC Myrhorod is a Ukrainian amateur football club from Myrhorod.

The club was established in 1990s and until 1997 it was known as FC Petrivtsi. In 1996 the club was admitted to the 1996–97 Ukrainian Second League. In 1997, the club moved to Myrhorod.

It plays in the Poltava Oblast Championship (second tier) and regional cup competition.

== League and cup history ==
| Season | Div. | Pos. | Pl. | W | D | L | GS | GA | P | Domestic Cup | Europe | Notes |
