= Polytechnic Stadium (Kremenchuk) =

Multi-purpose stadium in Kremenchuk, Ukraine

- Polytechnic
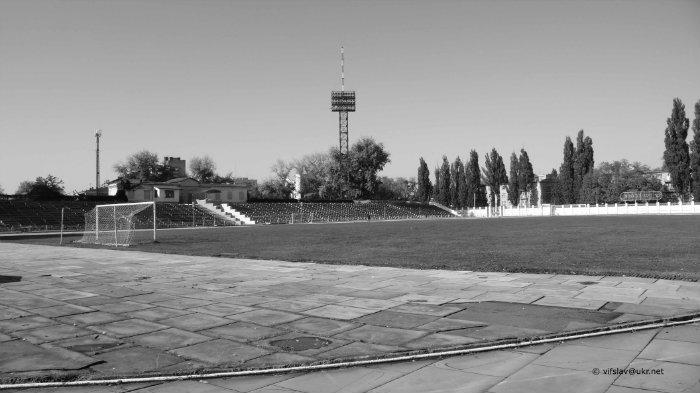
- Interactive map of Polytechnic Stadium
- Former names: Dnipro, KrAZ
- Location: Kremenchuk, Ukraine
- Coordinates: 49°5′23.11″N 33°25′50.93″E
- Owner: Kremenchuk State Polytechnic University
- Capacity: 11,300 (football)
- Surface: Grass
- Field size: 105 m × 68 m (344 ft × 223 ft)

Construction
- Opened: 1962

Polytechnic Stadium is a multi-purpose stadium that is part of the Polytechnic Sport Complex owned by Kremenchuk State University in Kremenchuk, Ukraine. It has historically served as the primary arena for Kremin Kremenchuk, until the club built its own stadium, Kremin-Arena.

The stadium is primarily used for football matches and was the home of FC Kremin Kremenchuk. The stadium holds 12,000–13,000 spectators. Until 1999, it was known as Dnipro Stadium, named after the club's former name.

During 2009 the University spent ₴ 435,000 to do renovations and refurbish the track.

== Gallery ==
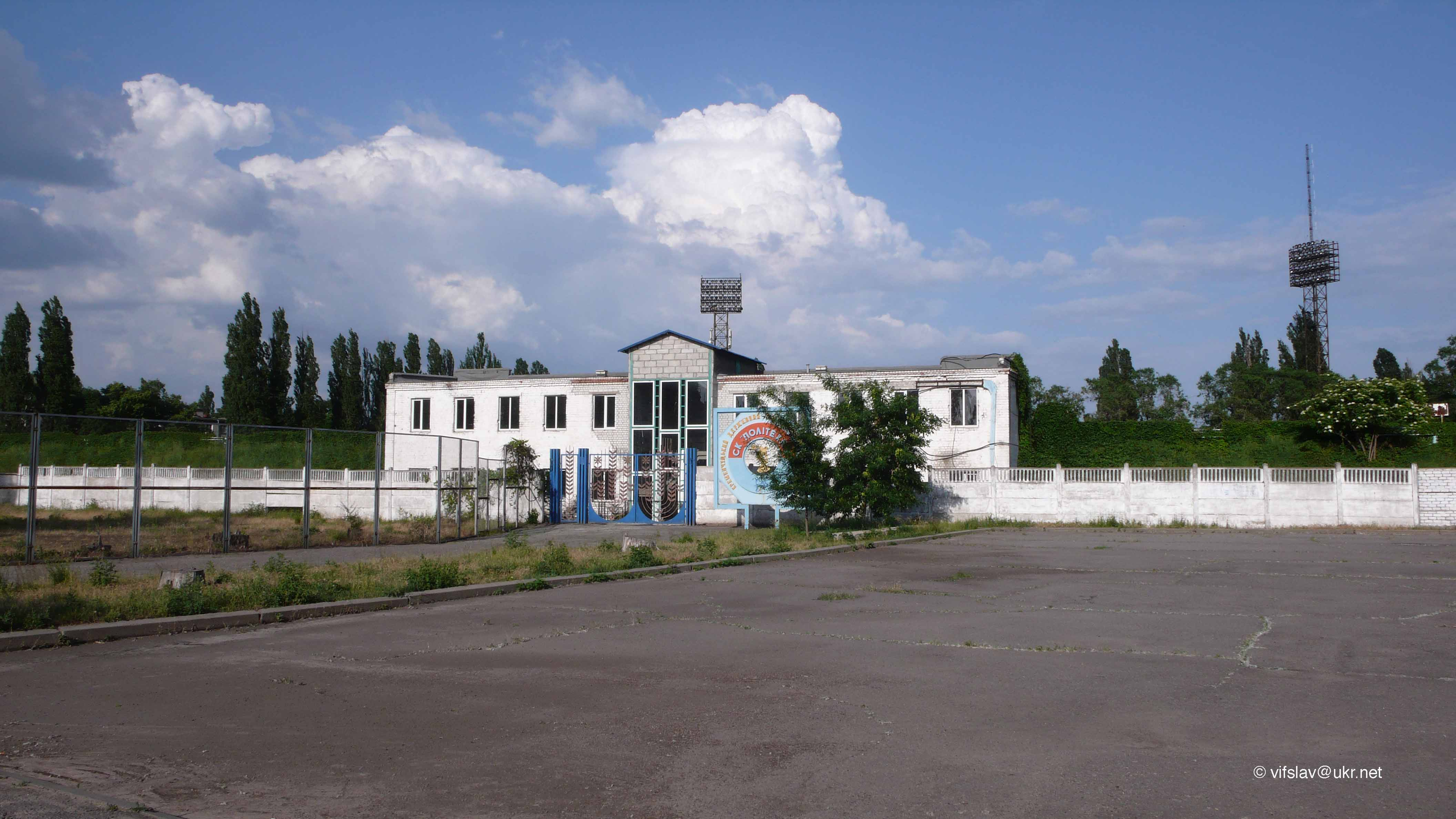
Panorama of entrance

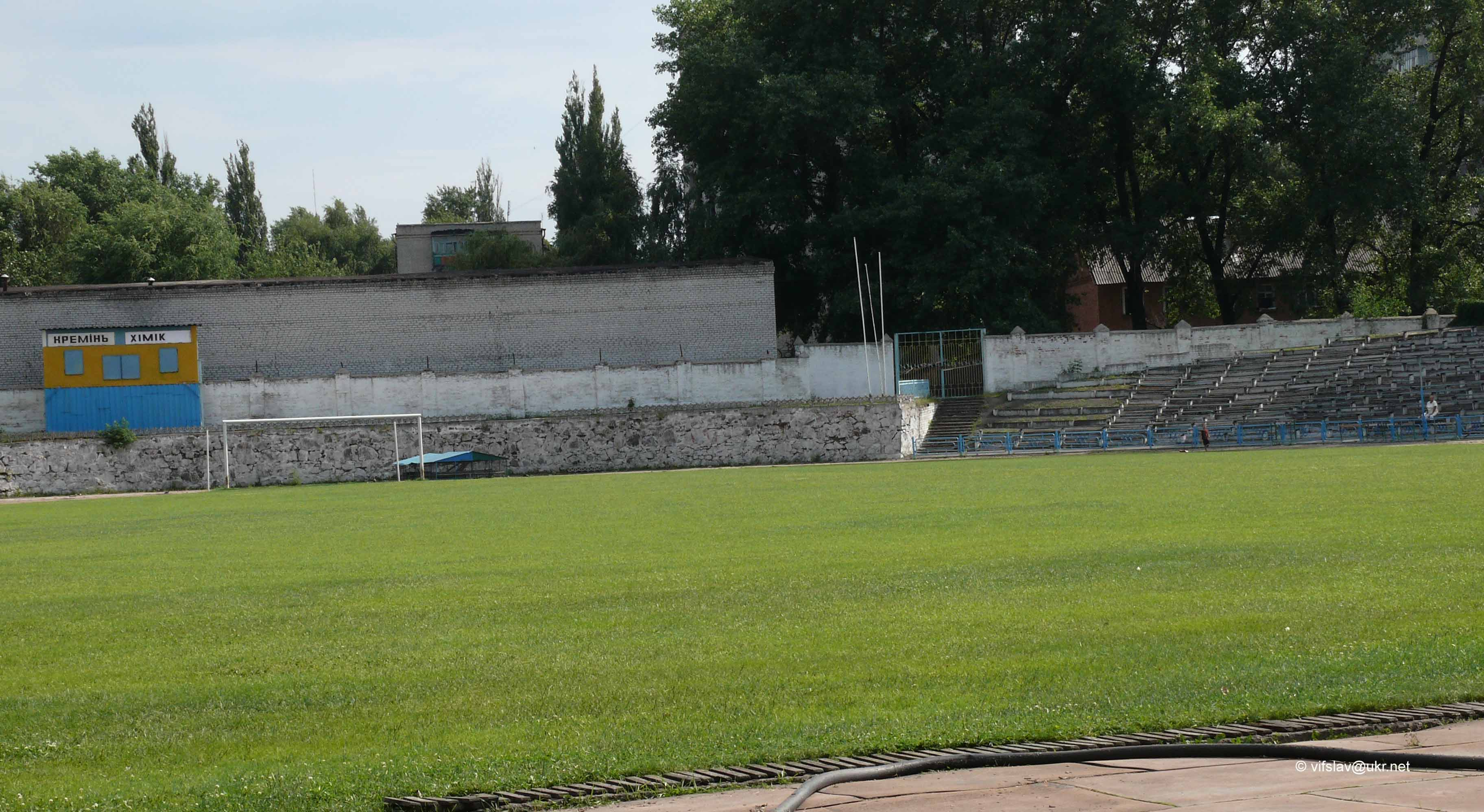
Panorama of stands
