= 2002–03 Ukrainian Second League =

Football league season

Ukrainian Second League
- Season: 2002–03
- Champions: FC LUKOR Kalush; FC Nafkom-Academia Irpin; FC Zorya Luhansk
- Relegated: FC Halychyna Drohobych; FC Torpedo Zaporizhzhia; ~~Kovel-Volyn~~ (withdrew); ~~Systema-KKhP Cherniakhiv~~ (withdrew); ~~Shakhtar Luhansk~~ (withdrew); ~~Stal-2 Alchevsk~~ (withdrew)
- Top goalscorer: (30) - Serhiy Levchenko (Nafkom-Academia Irpin)

The 2002–03 Ukrainian Second League was the 12th season of 3rd level professional football in Ukraine.

The competitions were divided into three groups according to geographical location in the country – A is western Ukraine, B is southern Ukraine and Crimea, and C is eastern Ukraine.

The groups were won respectively by FC LUKOR Kalush, FC Nafkom-Academia Irpin and FC Zorya Luhansk.

== Team changes ==
=== Promoted ===
The following team was promoted from the 2002 Ukrainian Football Amateur League:

- FC Systema KKhP Chernyakhiv – (debut)
- FC Shakhtar Luhansk – (debut)
- FC Yavir Krasnopilya – (debut, reinstated in 2000 in place of FC Yavir–Sumy)

The 2001 Ukrainian Football Amateur League participant:

- FC Vuhlyk Dymytrov – (debut)

Also, one more club was admitted additionally:

- PFC Sevastopol – (debut, last season Sevastopol was represented by FC Chayka-VMS Sevastopol)

=== Relegated ===
- FC Nyva Ternopil – (debut, previously (11 seasons ago) played in the 1991 Soviet Second League as Nyva Ternopil)
- FC Elektrometalurh-NZF Nikopol – (debut, previously (13 seasons ago) played in the 1989 Soviet Second League as Kolos Nikopol)
- FC Dnipro-2 Dnipropetrovsk – (returning after an absence of 2 seasons)

=== Withdrew ===
- FC Dynamo Lviv
- FC SKA-Orbita Lviv
- FC Zakarpattia-2 Uzhhorod
- FC Cherkasy
- FC Portovyk Illichivsk
- FC Mashynobudivnyk Druzhkivka
- FC Stal-2 Alchevsk

=== Renamed ===
- FC Krystal Kherson changed its name to SC Kherson.
- FC Metalurh-2 Mariupol changed its name to FC Illichivets-2 Mariupol.

=== Changed groups ===
- FC Dynamo-3 Kyiv moved from B to A
- FC Torpedo Zaporizhzhia moved from C to B

== Group A ==
=== Location map ===
Locations of team home grounds in Ukrainian Second League 2002–03 (Group A)

=== Final standings ===
Pos	Team	Pld	W	D	L	GF	GA	GD	Pts	Promotion or relegation
1	LUKOR Kalush (C)	28	21	2	5	56	25	+31	65	
2	Enerhetyk Burshtyn	28	19	2	7	44	23	+21	59	
3	Podillya Khmelnytskyi	28	18	4	6	45	16	+29	58	
4	Naftovyk Dolyna	28	16	6	6	35	16	+19	54	
5	Dynamo-3 Kyiv	28	14	8	6	30	22	+8	50	
6	Kovel-Volyn-2 Kovel (W)	28	11	6	11	29	31	−2	39	Withdrew
7	Veres Rivne	28	11	3	14	28	39	−11	36	
8	Nyva Ternopil	28	10	5	13	29	36	−7	35	
9	Hazovyk-Skala Stryi	28	8	9	11	15	23	−8	33	
10	Karpaty-3 Lviv	28	8	8	12	24	33	−9	32	
11	Tekhno-Centre Rohatyn	28	7	7	14	23	35	−12	28	
12	Systema-KKhP Cherniakhiv (W)	28	7	6	15	24	34	−10	27	Withdrew
13	Bukovyna Chernivtsi	28	6	6	16	20	39	−19	24	
14	Chornohora Ivano-Frankivsk	28	4	11	13	19	32	−13	23	
15	Halychyna Drohobych (R)	28	5	7	16	22	39	−17	22	Relegated

(C) Champions; (R) Relegated; (W) Withdrew

=== Top goalscorers ===
	Scorer	Goals (Pen.)	Team
1	Serhiy Sernetskyi	21	Nyva Ternopil
2	Bohdan Pavliuk	16	Enerhetyk Burshtyn
3	Serhiy Ruzhytskyi	11	Podillya Khmelnytskyi
3	Ihor Stasyuk	11	Podillya Khmelnytskyi
5	Denys Poida	10	LUKOR Kalush

== Group B ==
=== Location map ===
Locations of team home grounds in Ukrainian Second League 1992-93

=== Final standings ===
Pos	Team	Pld	W	D	L	GF	GA	GD	Pts	Promotion or relegation
1	Nafkom-Academia Irpin (C, P)	30	20	7	3	69	20	+49	67	Promoted
2	Dynamo Simferopol	30	18	7	5	53	27	+26	61	
3	Elektrometalurh-NZF Nikopol	30	18	7	5	37	20	+17	61	
4	Olkom Melitopol	30	18	5	7	45	27	+18	59	
5	Dnister Ovidiopol	30	14	5	11	27	23	+4	47	
6	Chornomorets-2 Odesa	30	11	13	6	42	25	+17	46	
7	Krystal Kherson	30	12	6	12	35	38	−3	42	
8	Olimpia AES Yuzhnoukrainsk	30	12	4	14	41	41	0	40	
9	Sevastopol	30	12	4	14	31	36	−5	40	
10	Ros Bila Tserkva	30	11	6	13	24	32	−8	39	
11	Obolon-2 Kyiv	30	10	7	13	41	45	−4	37	
12	Tytan Armyansk	30	8	5	17	30	48	−18	29	
13	Metalurh-2 Zaporizhzhia	30	7	8	15	33	44	−11	29	
14	Borysfen-2 Boryspil	30	9	1	20	23	51	−28	28	
15	Hirnyk-Sport Komsomolsk	30	7	6	17	27	48	−21	27	
16	Torpedo Zaporizhzhia (R)	30	4	7	19	19	52	−33	19	Relegated

(C) Champions; (P) Promoted; (R) Relegated

=== Top goalscorers ===
	Scorer	Goals (Pen.)	Team
1	Serhiy Levchenko	30	Naftovyk-Akademia Irpin
2	Oleksiy Hryshchenko	15	Dynamo Simferopol
3	Volodymyr Skrypka	13	Olimpiya AES Yuzhnoukrayinsk
4	Serhiy Mamonov	12	Dynamo Simferopol
4	Yevhen Sopyanychenko	12	Krystal Kherson

== Group C ==
=== Location map ===
Locations of team home grounds in Ukrainian Second League 1992-93

=== Final standings ===
Pos	Team	Pld	W	D	L	GF	GA	GD	Pts	Promotion or relegation
1	Zorya Luhansk (C, P)	28	23	2	3	62	17	+45	71	Promoted
2	Shakhtar Luhansk (W)	28	20	5	3	49	15	+34	65	Withdrew
3	Desna Chernihiv	28	19	1	8	36	25	+11	58	
4	Shakhtar-3 Donetsk	28	17	6	5	37	20	+17	57	
5	Stal Dniprodzerzhynsk	28	16	4	8	35	22	+13	52	
6	Metalurh-2 Donetsk	28	13	4	11	37	38	−1	43	
7	Metalist-2 Kharkiv	28	9	10	9	32	24	+8	37	
8	Dnipro-2 Dnipropetrovsk	28	10	4	14	28	34	−6	34	
9	Avanhard Rovenky	28	9	5	14	26	39	−13	32	
10	Yavir Krasnopillia	28	8	8	12	27	41	−14	32	
11	Illichivets-2 Mariupol	28	9	3	16	24	42	−18	30	
12	Vorskla-2 Poltava	28	7	6	15	30	44	−14	27	
13	Elektron Romny	28	7	2	19	17	41	−24	23	
14	Vuhlyk Dymytrov	28	5	8	15	12	37	−25	23	
15	Stal-2 Alchevsk (R, W)	28	3	2	23	9	22	−13	11	Relegated

(C) Champions; (P) Promoted; (R) Relegated; (W) Withdrew

=== Top goalscorers ===
	Scorer	Goals (Pen.)	Team
1	Kostyantyn Bublyk	13	Yavir Krasnopillia
2	Kostyantyn Pinchuk	12	Shakhtar Luhansk
3	Ihor Lytvynov	11	Zorya Luhansk
3	Dmytro Mashchenko	11	Zorya Luhansk
5	Vladyslav Havrylov	10	Stal Dniprodzerzhynsk

Druha Liha 2002-03 winners
FC LUKOR Kalush
1st title

Druha Liha 2002-03 winners
Nafkom-Academia Irpin
1st title

Druha Liha 2002-03 winners
Zorya Luhansk
1st title
