= 1999 Ukrainian Football Amateur League =

Ukrainian Football Amateur League
- Season: 1999
- Champions: Dnister Ovidiopol (1st title) Tekhno-Tsentr Rohatyn (losing finalist)

1999 Amateur championship of Ukraine was the eighth amateur championship of Ukraine and the 36th since the establishment of championship among fitness clubs (KFK) in 1964.

== Teams ==
=== Location map ===
Locations of team home grounds in the 1994-95 Ukrainian Championship among amateur teams

== First stage ==
=== Group 1 ===
Pos	Team	Pld	W	D	L	GF	GA	GD	Pts	Qualification
1	Tekhno-Tsentr Rohatyn	8	6	2	0	22	7	+15	20	Final stage
2	Sokil-Orion Velyki Hayi	8	5	1	2	12	8	+4	16	
3	Metalist Zdolbuniv	8	3	0	5	15	22	−7	9	
4	Khimik Rivne	8	2	1	5	5	16	−11	7	
5	Kirovets Mohyliv-Podilsky	8	2	0	6	14	15	−1	6	
6	Nyva-Tekstylnyk Dunayivtsi	0	-	-	-	0	0	0	0	withdrew

=== Group 2 ===
Pos	Team	Pld	W	D	L	GF	GA	GD	Pts	Qualification
1	KhPZ Varva	10	7	1	2	16	6	+10	22	Final stage
2	KKhP Cherniakiv	10	6	3	1	14	8	+6	21	Final stage
3	Nizhyn	10	5	3	2	14	6	+8	18	
4	Dnipro Kyiv	10	2	3	5	6	16	−10	9	
5	Refryzhyrator Fastiv	10	0	6	4	7	12	−5	6	
6	UFEI Irpin	10	1	2	7	5	14	−9	5	

=== Group 3 ===
Pos	Team	Pld	W	D	L	GF	GA	GD	Pts	Qualification
1	Krystal Parkhomivka	10	8	1	1	24	7	+17	25	Final stage
2	Frunzenets-Liha-99 Sumy	10	6	1	3	10	8	+2	19	Final stage
3	Shakhtar Luhansk	10	5	1	4	18	13	+5	16	
4	ETM-Merkuriy Kharkiv	10	4	1	5	11	13	−2	13	
5	Arsenal-2 Kharkiv	10	3	0	7	8	17	−9	9	
6	Metalurh Komsomolske	10	1	2	7	11	24	−13	5	

=== Group 4 ===
Pos	Team	Pld	W	D	L	GF	GA	GD	Pts	Qualification
1	Dnister Ovidiopol	10	8	2	0	24	5	+19	26	Final stage
2	Kolos Stepove	10	6	2	2	19	11	+8	20	Final stage
3	CSKA-3 Kyiv	10	4	1	5	10	18	−8	13	
4	Metalist-3 Kharkiv	10	3	3	4	4	9	−5	12	
5	Pervomaisk	10	3	1	6	9	13	−4	10	
6	Kremin-2 Kremenchuk	10	1	1	8	5	15	−10	4	

== Final stage ==
The finals took place in Ovidiopol, Odesa Oblast on October 20–24, 1999.

Pos	Team	Pld	W	D	L	GF	GA	GD	Pts	Qualification
1	Dnister Ovidiopol	2	2	0	0	5	1	+4	6	joined Tretia Liha
2	Frunzenets-Liha-99 Sumy	2	1	0	1	3	2	+1	3	joined Tretia Liha
3	KhPZ Varva	2	0	0	2	0	5	−5	0	

Pos	Team	Pld	W	D	L	GF	GA	GD	Pts	Qualification
1	Tekhno-Tsentr Rohatyn	3	2	1	0	4	2	+2	7	joined Tretia Liha
2	Krystal Parkhomivka	3	1	2	0	7	3	+4	5	joined Tretia Liha
3	Kolos Stepove	3	0	2	1	4	5	−1	2	
4	KKhP Cherniakhiv	3	0	1	2	3	8	−5	1	

== Post season playoffs ==
=== Final game ===
Dnister Ovidiopol	4–3 (a.e.t.)	Tekhno-Tsentr Rohatyn
	[ Report]

== Number of teams by region ==
Number	Region	Team(s)
4	Kharkiv Oblast	Arsenal-2 Kharkiv, ETM-Merkuriy Kharkiv, Krystal Parkhomivka, Metalist-3 Kharkiv
2	Chernihiv Oblast	HPZ Varva, FC Nizhyn
2	Kyiv	CSKA-3, Dnipro
2	Kyiv Oblast	Refryzherator Fastiv, UFEI Irpin
2	Mykolaiv Oblast	SC Pervomaisk, Kolos Stepove
2	Rivne Oblast	Khimik Rivne, Metalist Zdolbuniv
1	Donetsk Oblast	Metalurh Komsomolske
1	Ivano-Frankivsk Oblast	Tekhno-Tsentr Rohatyn
1	Khmelnytskyi Oblast	Nyva-Tekstylnyk Dunaivtsi
1	Luhansk Oblast	Shakhtar Luhansk
1	Odesa Oblast	Dnister Ovidiopol
1	Poltava Oblast	Kremin-2 Kremenchuk
1	Sumy Oblast	Frunzenets Sumy
1	Ternopil Oblast	Sokil-Orion Velyki Hayi
1	Vinnytsia Oblast	Kirovets Mohyliv-Podilskyi
1	Zhytomyr Oblast	KKhP Chernyakhiv

== See also ==
- 1999 Ukrainian Amateur Cup
