= 1998–99 Ukrainian Amateur Cup =

1998-99 Ukrainian Cup among amateurs
Tournament details
- Country: Ukraine

Final positions
- Champions: HPZ Varva
- Runners-up: Troyanda-Ekspres Hirka Polonka

The 1998–99 Ukrainian Amateur Cup was the third annual season of Ukraine's football knockout competition for amateur football teams. The competition started on 25 October 1998 and concluded on 17 June 1999.

This also was the first season of amateur cup football competitions that was administered by newly created (in 1998) Ukrainian Football Amateur Association.

The cup holders FC Zorya Khorostkiv did not enter.

== Participated clubs ==
In bold are clubs that are active at the same season AAFU championship (parallel round-robin competition).

- Chernihiv Oblast (1): **HPZ Varva**
- Chernivtsi Oblast (1): **Dnister Novodnistrovsk**
- Dnipropetrovsk Oblast (1): Druzhba-Khlib Ukrainy Mahdalynivka
- Donetsk Oblast (1): **Shakhta Ukraina Ukrainsk**
- Ivano-Frankivsk Oblast (1): **Beskyd Nadvirna**
- Kharkiv Oblast (2): **Arsenal Kharkiv**, **Krystal Parkhomivka**
- Khmelnytskyi Oblast (1): **Nyva-Tekstylnyk Dunaivtsi**
- Kyiv Oblast (1): Chaika Vyshhorod
- Kirovohrad Oblast (1): **Herkules Novoukrainka**
- Lviv Oblast (2): SC Truskavets, **Dynamo Lviv**
- Luhansk Oblast (1): Ekina Almazna
- Mykolaiv Oblast (1): **SC Pervomaisk**
- Odesa Oblast (1): **Dnister Ovidiopol**
- Poltava Oblast (1): **Sula Lubny**
- Sumy Oblast (1): **Kharchovyk Popivka**
- Ternopil Oblast (2): Lysonia Berezhany, Nyva Terebovlia
- Vinnytsia Oblast (1): **Kirovets Mohyliv-Podilskyi**
- Volyn Oblast (2): **Yavir Tsuman**, **Troyanda-Ekspres Hirka Polonka**
- Zakarpattia Oblast (1): Palanok Mukacheve
- Zaporizhia Oblast (1): ZAlK Zaporizhia
- Zhytomyr Oblast (1): **KKhP Cherniakhiv**

Notes

- Five regions did not provide any teams for the tournament, among which were Crimea, the oblasts of Cherkasy, Kherson, Rivne, and Kyiv City.

== Bracket ==
The following is the bracket that demonstrates the last four rounds of the Ukrainian Cup, including the final match. Numbers in parentheses next to the match score represent the results of a penalty shoot-out.

Round of 16
SC Pervomaisk	0	0	0
Dnister Ovidiopol	0	6	6
Arsenal Kharkiv	1	0	1
HPZ Varva (a)	1	0	1
ZAlK Zaporizhia	1	0	1
Shakhta Ukraina Ukrainsk	0	2	2
Kharchovyk Popivka	-	-	-
Druzhba-Khlib Ukrayiny Mahdalynivka	+	+	+
Kirovets Mohyliv-Podilsky	0	0	0
Troyanda-Ekspres Hirka Polonka	0	4	4
Lysonya Berezhany	-	-	-
Nyva Terebovlya	+	+	+
Yavir Tsuman	-	-	-
Dynamo Lviv	+	+	+
Palanok Mukacheve	-	-	-
KKhP Chernyakhiv	+	+	+

Quarter-finals
Dnister Ovidiopol	0	0	0
HPZ Varva	0	2	2
Druzhba-Khlib Ukrayiny Mahdalynivka	2	1	3
Shakhta Ukraina Ukrainsk (a.e.t.)	1	3	4
Troyanda-Ekspres Hirka Polonka	2	0	2
Nyva Terebovlya	0	0	0
Dynamo Lviv	5	1	6
KKhP Chernyakhiv	1	1	2

Semi-finals
Shakhta Ukraina Ukrainsk	2	0	2
HPZ Varva	2	1	3
Dynamo Lviv	3	0	3
Troyanda-Ekspres Hirka Polonka (a)	2	1	3

Final
HPZ Varva	4	3	7
Troyanda-Ekspres Hirka Polonka	0	3	3

== Competition schedule ==
=== First qualification round ===
Team 1	Agg.	Team 2	1st leg	2nd leg
Shakhta Ukraina Ukrainsk	4–3	Ekina Almazna	1–0	3–3
Herkules Novoukrayinka	-:+	ZAlK Zaporizhia	0–2	-:+
Krystal Parkhomivka	1–2	Druzhba-Khlib Ukrayiny Mahdalynivka	1–0	0–2
Kharchovyk Popivka	+:-	Sula Lubny	+:-	+:-
Troyanda-Ekspres Hirka Polonka	+:-	SC Truskavets	+:-	+:-
Chaika Vyshhorod	2–5	Nyva Terebovlya	0–0	2–5
Lusonya Berezhany	+:-	Nyva-Tekstylnyk Dunayivtsi	+:-	+:-
Dnister Novodnistrovsk	0–7	Kirovets Mohyliv-Podilsky	0–3	0–4
Palanok Mukacheve	+:-	Beskyd Nadvirna	+:-	+:-

=== Second qualification round ===
Team 1	Agg.	Team 2	1st leg	2nd leg
SC Pervomaisk	0–6	Dnister Ovidiopol	0–0	0–6
Arsenal Kharkiv	1–1 (a)	HPZ Varva	1–1	0–0
ZAlK Zaporizhia	1–2	Shakhta Ukraina Ukrainsk	1–0	0–2
Kharchovyk Popivka	-:+	Druzhba-Khlib Ukrayiny Mahdalynivka	-:+	-:+
Kirovets Mohyliv-Podilsky	0–4	Troyanda-Ekspres Hirka Polonka	0–0	0–4
Lysonya Berezhany	-:+	Nyva Terebovlya	-:+	-:+
Yavir Tsuman	-:+	Dynamo Lviv	-:+	-:+
Palanok Mukacheve	-:+	KKhP Chernyakhiv	-:+	-:+

=== Quarterfinals (1/4) ===
Team 1	Agg.	Team 2	1st leg	2nd leg
Dnister Ovidiopol	0–2	HPZ Varva	0–0	0–2
Troyanda-Ekspres Hirka Polonka	2–0	Nyva Terebovlya	2–0	0–0
Dynamo Lviv	6–2	KKhP Chernyakhiv	5–1	1–1
Druzhba-Khlib Ukrayiny Mahdalynivka	3–4	Shakhta Ukraina Ukrainsk	2–1	1–3 (a.e.t.)

=== Semifinals (1/2) ===
Team 1	Agg.	Team 2	1st leg	2nd leg
Shakhta Ukraina Ukrainsk	2–3	HPZ Varva	2–2	0–1
Dynamo Lviv	3–3 (a)	Troyanda-Ekspres Hirka Polonka	3–2	0–1

=== Final ===
Team 1	Agg.	Team 2	1st leg	2nd leg
HPZ Varva	7–3	Troyanda-Ekspres Hirka Polonka	4–0	3–3

Winner of the 1998–99 Ukrainian Football Cup among amateur teams
No emblem for HPZ Varva	Chernihiv Oblast
HPZ Varva (Chernihiv Oblast); 1st time

== See also ==
- 1998–99 Ukrainian Football Amateur League
- 1998–99 Ukrainian Cup
