= 1998–99 Ukrainian Football Amateur League =

Ukrainian Football Amateur League
- Season: 1998–99
- Champions: Dynamo Lviv (1st title) Krystal Parkhomivka (losing finalist)

1998–99 Ukrainian Football Amateur League was the seventh amateur championship of Ukraine and the 35th since the establishment of championship among fitness clubs (KFK) in 1964.

== Teams ==
=== Location map ===
Locations of team home grounds in the 1994-95 Ukrainian Championship among amateur teams

== First stage ==
=== Group 1 ===
Pos	Team	Pld	W	D	L	GF	GA	GD	Pts	Qualification
1	Troyanda-Ekspres Hirka Polonka	16	10	4	2	23	11	+12	34	Finals
2	Dynamo Lviv	16	9	5	2	31	11	+20	32	Finals
3	Yavir Tsuman	16	9	5	2	34	16	+18	32	
4	Nyva-Tekstylnyk Dunaivtsi	16	8	1	7	24	19	+5	25	
5	Kirovets Mohyliv-Podilsky	16	7	3	6	21	18	+3	24	
6	Beskyd Nadvirna	16	5	2	9	16	20	−4	17	withdrew
7	Opillia Rohatyn	16	5	2	9	14	20	−6	17	
8	Metalist Zdolbuniv	16	4	1	11	18	45	−27	13	
9	Dnister Novodnistrovsk	16	1	3	12	7	28	−21	6	

=== Group 2 ===
Pos	Team	Pld	W	D	L	GF	GA	GD	Pts	Qualification
1	KhPZ Varva	14	12	2	0	36	7	+29	38	Finals
2	KKhP Cherniakiv	14	8	1	5	19	16	+3	25	Finals
3	Refryzhyrator Fastiv	14	7	2	5	20	16	+4	23	
4	Obolon-Zmina-2 Kyiv	14	7	1	6	20	16	+4	22	
5	UFEI Irpin	14	6	4	4	12	12	0	22	
6	Domobudivnyk Chernihiv	14	5	0	9	16	15	+1	15	
7	Khimik Rivne	14	3	1	10	10	31	−21	10	
8	Interkas Kyiv	14	2	1	11	7	27	−20	7	
9	Slavutych	0	0	0	0	0	0	0	0	withdrew

=== Group 3 ===
Pos	Team	Pld	W	D	L	GF	GA	GD	Pts	Qualification
1	Arsenal Kharkiv	18	15	1	2	19	6	+13	46	Finals
2	Krystal Parkhomivka	18	14	4	0	16	5	+11	46	Finals
3	Enerhetyk Komsomolske	18	11	3	4	19	12	+7	36	
4	Metalurh Komsomolske	18	9	4	5	16	14	+2	31	
5	Zolote-Almaz Pervomaisk	18	4	2	12	6	14	−8	14	withdrew
6	Kharchovyk Popivka	18	3	3	12	10	10	0	12	withdrew
7	Slovianets Konotop	18	4	0	14	9	9	0	12	withdrew
8	Shakhta Ukraina Ukrainsk	18	2	5	11	9	12	−3	11	withdrew
9	Pivdenstal Yenakiieve	18	2	0	16	3	17	−14	6	withdrew
10	Sula Lubny	18	1	2	15	6	14	−8	5	withdrew

=== Group 4 ===
Pos	Team	Pld	W	D	L	GF	GA	GD	Pts	Qualification
1	Dnister Ovidiopol	12	9	2	1	26	4	+22	29	Finals
2	SVKh-Danyka Simferopol	12	9	0	3	19	5	+14	27	Finals
3	Hirnyk Balaklava	12	5	3	4	11	10	+1	18	
4	Pervomaisk	12	5	3	4	8	10	−2	18	
5	Herkules Novoukrayinka	12	5	0	7	4	31	−27	15	
6	Lokomotyv Znamianka	12	3	3	6	8	5	+3	12	withdrew
7	Ikar-MAKBO-94 Kirovohrad	12	0	1	11	3	14	−11	1	withdrew

== Finals ==
The second stage was finals that took place in Lutsk, Volyn Oblast on June 2–6, 1999.

=== Group A ===
Pos	Team	Pld	W	D	L	GF	GA	GD	Pts	Qualification
1	Krystal Parkhomivka	3	1	2	0	5	4	+1	5	Final game
2	Troyanda-Ekspres Hirka Polonka	3	1	2	0	3	2	+1	5	
3	Dnister Ovidiopol	3	1	1	1	4	3	+1	4	
4	KKhP Cherniakhiv	3	0	1	2	0	3	−3	1	

=== Group B ===
Pos	Team	Pld	W	D	L	GF	GA	GD	Pts	Qualification
1	Dynamo Lviv	3	2	1	0	6	2	+4	7	Final game
2	KhPZ Varva	3	2	0	1	4	2	+2	6	
3	SVKh-Danyka Simferopol	3	1	0	2	4	5	−1	3	
4	Arsenal Kharkiv	3	0	1	2	0	5	−5	1	

== Number of teams by region ==
Number	Region	Team(s)
3	Donetsk Oblast	Metalurh Komsomolske, Pivdenstal Yenakieve, Shakhta Ukraina Ukrainsk
3	Kharkiv Oblast	Arsenal Kharkiv, Enerhetyk Komsomolske, Krystal Parkhomivka
3	Kirovohrad Oblast	Herkules Novoukrainka, Ikar-MAKBO-94 Kirovohrad, Lokomotyv Znamianka
3	Kyiv Oblast	Refryzherator Fastiv, UFEI Irpin, FC Slavutych
2	Autonomous Republic of Crimea	Hirnyk Balaklava, SVKh-Danyka Simferopol
2	Ivano-Frankivsk Oblast	Beskyd Nadvirna, Opillia Rohatyn
2	Kyiv	Inkeras, Obolon-Zmina-2
2	Rivne Oblast	Khimik Rivne, Metalist Zdolbuniv
2	Sumy Oblast	Kharchovyk Popivka, Slovianets Konotop
2	Volyn Oblast	Troyanda-Ekspres Hirka Polonka, Yavir Tsuman
1	Chernihiv Oblast	Domobudivnyk Chernihiv
1	Chernivtsi Oblast	Dnister Novodnistrovsk
1	Khmelnytskyi Oblast	Kolos-Tekstylnyk Dunaivtsi
1	Luhansk Oblast	Zolote-Almaz Pervomaisk
1	Lviv Oblast	Dynamo Lviv
1	Mykolaiv Oblast	SC Pervomaisk
1	Odesa Oblast	Dnister Ovidiopol
1	Poltava Oblast	Sula Lubny
1	Vinnytsia Oblast	Kirovets Mohyliv-Podilskyi
1	Zhytomyr Oblast	KKhP Chernyakhiv
