= 2002 Ukrainian Football Amateur League =

Ukrainian Football Amateur League
- Season: 2002
- Champions: KZEZO Kakhovka (1st title) Fakel-HPZ Varva (runner-up)
- UEFA Regions' Cup: FC KZEZO Kakhovka

Following are the results of the Ukrainian Football Amateur League 2002 season. Participation is restricted to the regional (Oblast) champions and/or the most regarded team by the respective regional association.

This season's competition consisted of four stages as the previous. First two stages were organized in regional principal in groups of four or five and were played in two rounds where each team could play another at its home ground. The semifinals and finals, on the other hand, were played in one round and this year were organized in the city of Kakhovka. On the first stage each group winners and their immediate runners-up were to advance to the next part of the competition. Due to few teams joining the professional competition the format was adjusted and to the second stage only eleven teams advanced. The second stage was split in four groups where first two places were advancing to the semifinals. The semifinals, in their turn, were split in two groups where first two teams were advancing to the winners final of four.

Note: ZALK stands for the Zaporzhian Aliuminum Plant (Kombinat in Ukrainian).
KZEZO stands for the Kakhovkan Factory (Zavod) of Electro-Welding Equipment (Elektro-Zvariuvalnoho Obladnannia).

== Teams ==
=== Location map ===
Locations of team home grounds in the 1994-95 Ukrainian Championship among amateur teams

== First stage ==
Note: Some records are not full.

=== Group A ===
Pos	Team	Pld	W	D	L	GF	GA	GD	Pts	Qualification
1	Luzhany	8	5	2	1	15	5	+10	17	Second Stage
2	Systema-KKhP Cherniakhiv	8	4	2	2	6	0	+6	14	joined Druha Liha
3	Ikva Mlyniv	8	3	2	3	5	10	−5	11	Second Stage
4	Lysonia Berezhany	8	3	1	4	11	8	+3	10	
5	Lokomotyv Zdolbuniv	8	1	1	6	3	17	−14	4	Second Stage

=== Group B ===
Pos	Team	Pld	W	D	L	GF	GA	GD	Pts	Qualification
1	Fakel Varva	8	4	3	1	13	8	+5	15	Second Stage
2	Ikar MAKBO 94 Kirovohrad	8	4	1	3	7	9	−2	13	Second Stage
3	Dnipro Eurobis Kyiv	8	3	2	3	9	8	+1	11	Second Stage
4	Kremez	8	3	2	3	8	7	+1	11	Second Stage
5	Kolos Chornobai	8	1	2	5	6	11	−5	5	

=== Group C ===
Pos	Team	Pld	W	D	L	GF	GA	GD	Pts	Qualification
1	Naftovyk-Psel Hadiach	8	3	5	0	10	3	+7	14	Second Stage
2	Evropa Pryliuky	8	4	2	2	9	5	+4	14	Second Stage
3	Nizhyn	8	3	3	2	11	8	+3	12	Second Stage
4	Naftovyk-2 Okhtyrka	8	2	2	4	4	10	−6	8	
5	Yavir Krasnopillia	8	1	2	5	3	11	−8	5	joined Druha Liha

=== Group D ===
Pos	Team	Pld	W	D	L	GF	GA	GD	Pts	Qualification
1	KZEZO Kakhovka	6	6	0	0	13	1	+12	18	Second Stage
2	Kolos Stepove	6	3	1	2	7	6	+1	10	Second Stage
3	Vodnyk Mykolaiv	6	2	1	3	7	8	−1	7	Second Stage
4	VAVK Volodymyrivka	6	0	0	6	2	14	−12	0	

=== Group E ===
Pos	Team	Pld	W	D	L	GF	GA	GD	Pts	Qualification
1	SlovKhlib Sloviansk	6	5	0	1	14	6	+8	15	
2	Dynamo Stakhanov	6	3	1	2	12	8	+4	10	Second Stage
3	Batkivschyna Kryvyi Rih	6	3	0	3	6	9	−3	9	
4	Monolit Konstantynivka	6	0	1	5	2	11	−9	1	

=== Group F ===
Pos	Team	Pld	W	D	L	GF	GA	GD	Pts	Qualification
1	ZALK Zaporizhia	6	6	0	0	16	5	+11	18	Second Stage
2	Shakhtar Luhansk	6	4	0	2	13	7	+6	12	joined Druha Liha
3	PivdenStal Enakieve	6	1	1	4	2	9	−7	4	
4	Shakhtar Rodynske	6	0	1	5	3	13	−10	1	

== Second stage ==
=== Group 1 ===
Pos	Team	Pld	W	D	L	GF	GA	GD	Pts	Qualification
1	Luzhany	4	2	1	1	10	7	+3	7	Semifinals
2	Lokomotyv Zdolbuniv	4	2	0	2	8	8	0	6	Semifinals
3	Ikva Mlyniv	4	1	1	2	4	7	−3	4	

Note: Mukacheve withdrew.

=== Group 2 ===
Pos	Team	Pld	W	D	L	GF	GA	GD	Pts	Qualification
1	Nizhyn	6	5	0	1	15	6	+9	15	withdrew
2	Vodnyk Mykolaiv	6	3	1	2	7	7	0	10	Semifinals
3	Fakel Varva	6	2	0	4	7	12	−5	6	Semifinals
4	Dnipro Eurobis Kyiv	6	1	1	4	7	11	−4	4	

=== Group 3 ===
Pos	Team	Pld	W	D	L	GF	GA	GD	Pts	Qualification
1	KZEZO Kakhovka	8	6	0	2	18	8	+10	18	Semifinals
2	Evropa Pryliuky	8	5	2	1	8	5	+3	17	Semifinals
3	Ikar MAKBO 94 Kirovohrad	8	5	1	2	11	8	+3	16	
4	Kolos Stepove	8	1	2	5	3	14	−11	5	
5	Kremez	8	0	1	7	1	6	−5	1	

=== Group 4 ===
Pos	Team	Pld	W	D	L	GF	GA	GD	Pts	Qualification
1	Naftovyk-Psel Hadiach	6	4	2	0	9	3	+6	14	Semifinals
2	ZALK Zaporizhia	6	3	3	0	12	5	+7	12	Semifinals
3	Dynamo Stakhanov	6	2	1	3	3	9	−6	7	
4	Shakhtar Konotop	6	0	0	6	3	10	−7	0	

== Semifinals ==
=== Group 1 ===
Pos	Team	Pld	W	D	L	GF	GA	GD	Pts	Qualification
1	KZEZO Kakhovka	3	2	1	0	8	4	+4	7	Final
2	Fakel Varva	3	2	0	1	8	4	+4	6	Final
3	ZALK Zaporizhia	3	1	1	1	3	2	+1	4	
4	Lokomotyv Zdolbuniv	3	0	0	3	0	9	−9	0	

=== Group 2 ===
Pos	Team	Pld	W	D	L	GF	GA	GD	Pts	Qualification
1	Vodnyk Mykolaiv	3	1	2	0	3	2	+1	5	Final
2	Evropa Pryliuky	3	1	2	0	1	0	+1	5	Final
3	Luzhany	3	0	2	1	1	2	−1	2	
4	Naftovyk-Psel Hadiach	3	0	2	1	1	2	−1	2	

== Final Group ==
Pos	Team	Pld	W	D	L	GF	GA	GD	Pts	Qualification
1	KZEZO Kakhovka	3	2	1	0	8	5	+3	7	Champion
2	Fakel Varva	3	1	1	1	6	5	+1	4	
3	Vodnyk Mykolaiv	3	0	3	0	3	3	0	3	
4	Evropa Pryliuky	3	0	1	2	0	4	−4	1	

== Number of teams by region ==
Number	Region	Team(s)
5	Donetsk Oblast	Monolit Kostiantynivka, Pivdenstal Yenakieve, Shakhtar Rodynske, Slovkhlib Sloviansk, VAVK Volodymyrivka
3	Chernihiv Oblast	Fakel Varva, FC Nizhyn, Yevropa Pryluky
2	Luhansk Oblast	Dynamo Stakhanov, Shakhtar Luhansk
2	Mykolaiv Oblast	Kolos Stepove, Vodnyk Mykolaiv
2	Poltava Oblast	Kremez Kremenchuk, Naftovyk-Psel Hadiach
2	Rivne Oblast	Ikva Mlyniv, Lokomotyv Zdolbuniv
2	Sumy Oblast	Naftovyk-2 Okhtyrka, Yavir Krasnopillia
1	Cherkasy Oblast	Kolos Chornobai
1	Chernivtsi Oblast	FC Luzhany
1	Dnipropetrovsk Oblast	Rodina Kryvyi Rih
1	Kherson Oblast	KZEZO Kakhovka
1	Kirovohrad Oblast	Ikar-MAKBO Kirovohrad
1	Kyiv	Dnipro
1	Ternopil Oblast	Lysonia Berezhany
1	Zaporizhia Oblast	ZAlK Zaporizhia
1	Zhytomyr Oblast	KKhP Chernyakhiv
