= FC SKA-Orbita Lviv =

SKA-Orbita Lviv
- Full name: FC SKA-Orbita Lviv
- Founded: 2000
- Dissolved: 2003
- Ground: SKA Stadium, Lviv
- Chairman: Anatoliy Tyshchenko
- Manager: Roman Derkach

FC SKA-Orbita Lviv was a Ukrainian football club from Lviv, Lviv Oblast. Oleksandr Svishchov was the club's president.

The club did not play at any single elimination tournaments (cup competitions) at national level (amateur or professional).

During its professional period, SKA-Orbita played its home games at SKA Stadium.

== Overview ==
The club was created in 2000 by a former Soviet and later Ukrainian football functionary Anatoliy Tyshchenko at that time when there were discussions for the merger of FC Lviv with FC Karpaty Lviv. The club was created in 2000 to replace struggling Naftovyk Boryslav that accidentally qualified to the second stage. Naftovyk-SKA also included players from Dynamo-Orbita Kamianets-Podilskyi which was composed of players from Nyva Dunaivtsi. At the first stage of 2000, Naftovyk Boryslav gained its only win by administrative decision and qualified to the next stage because Tekhno-Tsentr Rohatyn was admitted to Druha Liha (Ukrainian Second League). The new club Naftovyk-SKA-Orbita Lviv at the Second stage placed first among four participants with big goal margin and one loss, which made it qualified to final stage in Chernihiv Oblast. During the final stage Naftovyk-SKA yielded first place to hosting Fakel Varva and for the third place play-off match it lost to Kovel 1:2.

The 2001 the club competed as SKA-Orbita Lviv and started out at amateur level among Kovel, Yavir Tsuman, Tytan Irshansk and Sokil Radyvyliv. It managed to place third behind Kovel and qualify for the second stage, but instead was admitted to Second League and continued its season at professional level.

In 2001 the club was admitted to the Ukrainian Second League (Druha Liha). Its first game it played away against Dynamo Lviv at Sokil Stadium in Lviv on 22 July 2001 tying it at 0. Its first home game the club played on 30 July 2001 against Tsementnyk-Khorda Mykolaiv at SKA stadium in Lviv and lost 1:2. The first goal at professional level was scored by Bohdan Kostyk. The first win the club gained in Round 5 (22 August) in an away game against Enerhetyk Burshtyn 1:0, when Katrevych scored the only goal. Yuriy Krevskyi who came to the club from Kovel became the club's all-time top goal scorer with 7 goals.

On 18 January 2002 Tyshchenko as the club's president participated in a conference of professional football clubs in Lviv Oblast which discussed a possibility of cooperation.

After the club's bankruptcy in 2002, several players joined FC Rava Rava-Ruska.

== League and cup history ==
Season	Div.	Pos.	Pl.	W	D	L	GS	GA	P	Domestic Cup	Europe	Notes
Naftovyk Boryslav
2000	4th	3/_{4}	6	1	3	2	1	7	6			Qualified to Second stage
2000	4th	Naftovyk-SKA-Orbita Lviv										
2000	4th	1/_{4}	6	5	0	1	12	2	15			Qualified to Final stage
2000	4th	2/_{4}	3	1	1	1	5	5	4			lost the game for third to Kovel (1:2)
SKA-Orbita Lviv
2001	4th	3/_{5}	8	3	2	3	10	5	11			Admitted to Second League after First stage
2001-02	3rd "A"	13/_{19}	36	8	15	13	30	40	39			

== Head coaches ==
- Roman Derkach

== Players ==
- Andriy Boiko (3 September 1979) – 7, - (Volyn Lutsk)
- Vasyl Buchko (14 December 1981) – -, - (Lysonia Berezhany)
- Mykola Voitsekhovskyi (19 December 1982) – 17, 1
- Stanislav Doludenko (18 March 1983) – -, -
- Serhiy Dudarenko (7 December 1976) – 17, 3
- Valentyn Dyachuk (17 January 1973) – 11, - (Troyanda-Ekspres)
- Ivan Kazymyrskyi (7 July 1981) – -, - (Karpaty-2)
- Ivan Katrevych (7 January 1978) – 33, 4 (Nyva-Tekstylnyk Dunaivtsi)
- Bohdan Kostyk (22 January 1983) – 33, 5 (Ukraina Lviv)
- Lyubomyr Kostyuk (18 April 1982) – 32, - (Lviv)
- Volodymyr Kotovych (15 March 1983) – -, -
- Yuriy Krevskyi (26 September 1976) – 29, 7 (Kovel)
- Yuriy Kupetskyi (17 November 1981) – 6, - (Hazovyk Komarno)
- Maksym Levchenko (30 January 1981) – 27, - (Lysonia Berezhany)
- Volodymyr Levchuk (3 February 1982) – 3, - (Premier-Group)
- Oleksiy Lytvynchuk (24 May 1975) – 31, -37 (Kovel)
- Volodymyr Lukiv (23 May 1978) – 19, - (Nyva-Tekstylnyk Dunaivtsi)
- Vasyl Mavdryk (14 April 1976) – 16, 1 (Halychyna Drohobych)
- Mykhailo Marko (20 November 1980) – 30, - (Karpaty-2)
- Ihor Melnyk (2 June 1982) – 3, - (SC Odesa)
- Mykola Oliynyk (31 May 1984) – 4, -
- Andriy Panchuk (8 January 1981) – 30, - (Halychyna Drohobych)
- (Georgia (country)) Tengiz Pataraya (11 February 1974) – 13, 2 (Guria Lachkhuti)
- Roman Pauchok (27 June 1978) – 33, 2 (Dynamo Lviv)
- Oleksandr Pyvko (25 December 1983) – 4, - (Metalist Zdolbuniv)
- Ihor Polishchuk (29 September 1977) – 16, 1 (Kovel)
- Zakhar Sabadash (19 October 1981) – 31, 1 (Dynamo Lviv)
- Ruslan Tymofiyev (17 November 1980) – 31, 1 (Nyva-Tekstylnyk Dunaivtsi)
- Serhiy Tyshchenko (17 May 1982) – 20, - (Karpaty-2)
- Andriy Fedyuk (3 July 1981) – 17, 2 (Dynamo Lviv)
- Leonid Chaban (13 September 1972) – 21, - (Volyn Lutsk)
- Yevhen Yushchyshyn (8 September 1974) – 8, -3 (Halychyna Drohobych)
