= Oleksandr Svishchov =

Ukrainian sports functionary

Oleksandr Yuriyovych Svishchov
- Олександр Юрійович Свіщов
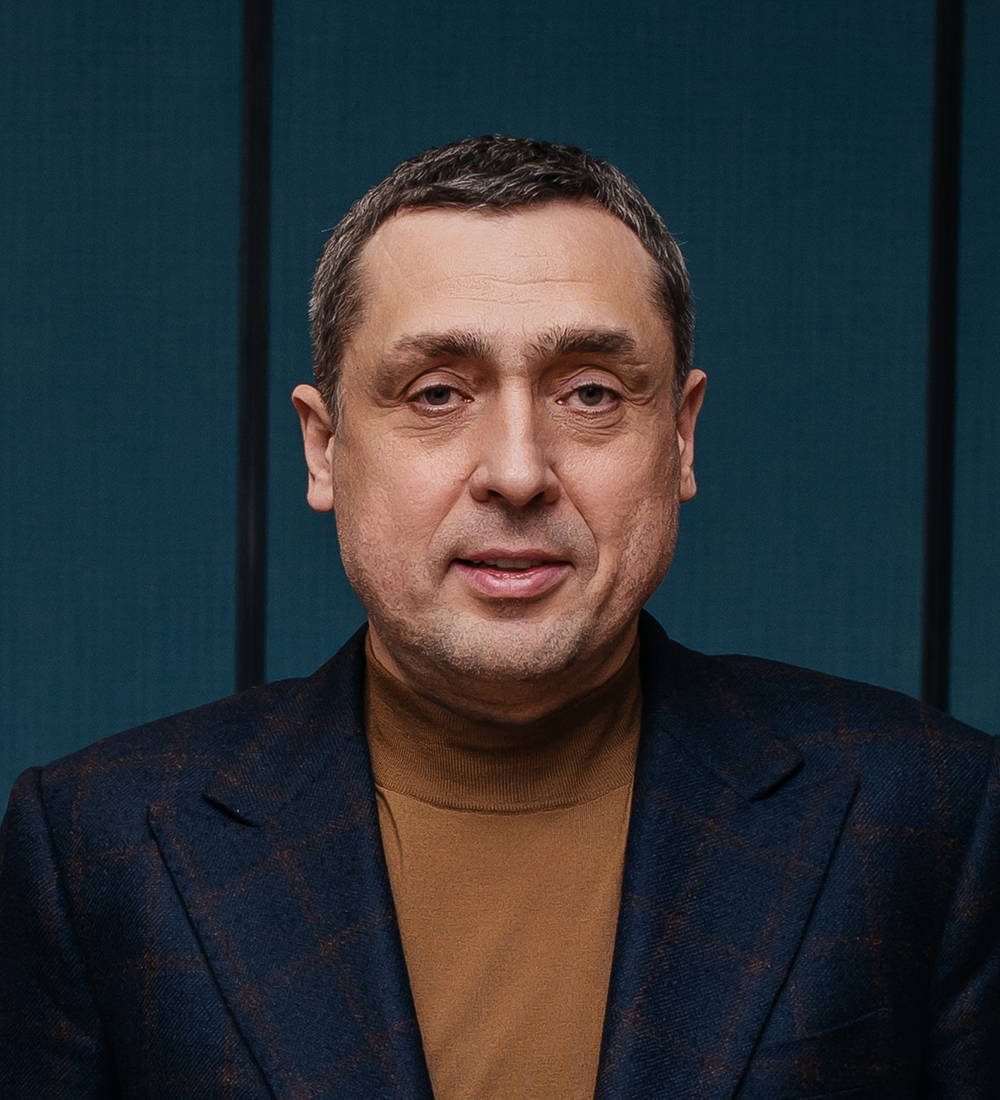

President of the Ukrainian Water Polo Federation
- Incumbent
- Assumed office 17 June 2021
- Preceded by: Oleksandr Kucherenko

Personal details
- Born: 22 September 1970 (age 56) Lviv, Lviv Oblast, Ukrainian SSR
- Education: Lviv University of Business and Law
- Profession: Sports executive, Sports administrator
- Website: svishchov.com.ua

Oleksandr Yuriyovych Svishchov (Ukrainian: Олександр Юрійович Свіщов; born 22 September 1970 in Lviv, Lviv Oblast, Ukrainian SSR) is a Ukrainian sports executive and entrepreneur.

Svishchov has been the President of the Ukrainian Water Polo Federation since June 17, 2021 and served as its Vice-President from 2014 to 2021. He has been the President of the Dynamo (Lviv) water polo club since 2012.

== Biography ==
=== Early life ===
Oleksandr Svishchov was born on September 22, 1970, in the city of Lviv, Ukraine. In 1987, he finished secondary school and enrolled in Lviv Professional Technical School No. 22, where he graduated in 1989 with a degree of «horologist».

From 1989 to 1994, he worked as a watch repair master. Then, he became a sales manager at LLC Kamaz-Lviv and in 1997 was promoted to deputy sales director, where he worked until 2006.

=== Entrepreneurial career ===
In 1999, Oleksandr Svishchov began producing spare parts and components for heavy machinery. In 2000, he invested in LLC Automat shares and became one of the shareholders and co-owners of the company.

In 2002, he acquired shares in the Sambir Experimental Machine-Building Plant and became its co-owner. In 2006, Oleksandr Svishchov became a shareholder of the «Lyvarniy Zavod» and was its commercial director until 2011.

From 2011 to 2012, he held the position of Chairman of the Supervisory Board of JSC «Automat». In 2012, he sold his company's shares and invested in retail trade of tobacco products.

In 2019, he became a co-founder of the Lviv Tobacco Factory.

In 2021, he graduated from Lviv University of Business and Law with a degree in «International Relations, Public Communications and Regional Stages».

Since 2021, he has been Lviv Regional Council Chairman's advisor.

=== Sports career ===
From 2001 to 2003, he was the Head of the SKA-Orbita Ukrainian football club (Lviv).

In 2012, he became the president of «Dynamo Lviv» water polo club. Over the next few years, the club became the champion of Ukraine, the winner of the Ukrainian Cup and a three-time winner of the Ukrainian Super Cup.

In 2014, he was elected as Vice President of the Ukrainian Water Polo Federation. On June 17, 2021, Oleksandr Svishchov was elected as President of the Ukrainian Water Polo Federation for a 4-year term as the result of the reporting-and-election conference.

== Awards ==
- The «30 years of Independence of Ukraine» distinction sign — for the development of sports potential and physical culture of Ukraine.
- The «sign of respect» award from the Ministry of Defense of Ukraine — for volunteer support of the Armed Forces of Ukraine and humanitarian & financial assistance.
