= 2001 Ukrainian Football Amateur League =

Ukrainian Football Amateur League
- Season: 2001
- Champions: Shakhtar Luhansk (1st title) Monolit Kostiantynivka (runner-up)
- Runner up: FC Monolit Konstantynivka, FC Vuhlyk Dymytrov
- Top goalscorer: K. Pinchuk (FC Shakhtar Luhansk)

Ukrainian Football Amateur League 2001 was the sixth season of the national amateur football competition in Ukraine since their reorganization in 1997.

== Overview and format ==
This season competition consisted of four stages with 35 teams participating. First two stages were organized in regional principal in groups of four or five and were played in two rounds where each team could play another at its home ground. The semifinals and finals, on the other hand, were played in one round. During the season several teams withdrew, while others successfully applied for a professional status.

On the first stage each group winners and their immediate runners-up were to advance to the next part of the competition. Due to few teams joining the professional competition the format was adjusted and to the second stage only eleven teams advanced. The second stage was split in four groups where first two places were advancing to the semifinals. The semifinals, in their turn, were split in two groups where first two teams were advancing to the winners final of four and the last two teams—to the losers final of four. The finals were cut short as Shakhtar Luhansk earned the maximum points after just two games and thus securing the season's title with the.

Note: ZALK stands for the Zaporzhian Aliuminum Plant (Kombinat in Ukrainian).
KZEZO stands for the Kakhovkan Factory (Zavod) of Electro-Welding Equipment (Elektro-Zvariuvalnoho Obladnannia).

== Teams ==
=== Location map ===
Locations of team home grounds in the 1994-95 Ukrainian Championship among amateur teams

== First stage ==
Teams that applied to the 2001-02 Second League discontinuing their further participation in the competition: SKA-Orbita Lviv, Stal Dniprodzerzhynsk, and Dnister Ovidiopol.

=== Group A ===
| Pos | Team | Pld | W | D | L | GF | GA | GD | Pts | Qualification |
|---|---|---|---|---|---|---|---|---|---|---|
| 1 | Luzhany | 6 | 4 | 2 | 0 | 20 | 3 | +17 | 14 | Second Stage |
| 2 | Lysonia Berezhany | 6 | 2 | 2 | 2 | 6 | 6 | 0 | 8 | Second Stage |
| 3 | Nyva-Tekstylnyk Dunaivtsi | 6 | 2 | 1 | 3 | 3 | 12 | −9 | 7 | Second Stage |
| 4 | Bukovyna-2 Chernivtsi | 6 | 1 | 1 | 4 | 6 | 14 | −8 | 4 | |

Source: RSSSF

=== Group B ===
| Pos | Team | Pld | W | D | L | GF | GA | GD | Pts | Qualification |
|---|---|---|---|---|---|---|---|---|---|---|
| 1 | Yavir VolynLis Tsuman | 8 | 5 | 3 | 0 | 10 | 4 | +6 | 18 | Second Stage |
| 2 | Kovel-Volyn Kovel | 8 | 3 | 4 | 1 | 7 | 6 | +1 | 13 | Second Stage |
| 3 | SKA-Orbita Lviv | 8 | 3 | 2 | 3 | 10 | 5 | +5 | 11 | joined Druha Liha |
| 4 | Tytan Irshansk | 8 | 3 | 2 | 3 | 3 | 8 | −5 | 11 | Second Stage |
| 5 | Sokil Radyvyliv | 8 | 0 | 1 | 7 | 4 | 11 | −7 | 1 | withdrew |

Source: RSSSF

Note: SKA-Orbita Lviv decided to join Druha Liha.
Sokil Radyvyliv withdrew.

=== Group C ===
| Pos | Team | Pld | W | D | L | GF | GA | GD | Pts | Qualification |
|---|---|---|---|---|---|---|---|---|---|---|
| 1 | Systema-KKhP Cherniakhiv | 6 | 4 | 1 | 1 | 20 | 5 | +15 | 13 | Second Stage |
| 2 | Nizhyn | 6 | 4 | 0 | 2 | 11 | 3 | +8 | 12 | Second Stage |
| 3 | Budivelnyk-Nyva Hnivan | 6 | 2 | 1 | 3 | 6 | 6 | 0 | 7 | Second Stage |
| 4 | Metalist Zdolbuniv | 6 | 1 | 0 | 5 | 4 | 27 | −23 | 3 | |

Source: RSSSF

=== Group D ===
| Pos | Team | Pld | W | D | L | GF | GA | GD | Pts | Qualification |
|---|---|---|---|---|---|---|---|---|---|---|
| 1 | Fakel Varva | 8 | 5 | 3 | 0 | 10 | 4 | +6 | 18 | Second Stage |
| 2 | Evropa Pryliuky | 8 | 3 | 4 | 1 | 7 | 6 | +1 | 13 | Second Stage |
| 3 | Dnipro Kyiv | 8 | 3 | 2 | 3 | 10 | 5 | +5 | 11 | Second Stage |
| 4 | Drabiv | 8 | 3 | 2 | 3 | 3 | 8 | −5 | 11 | |
| 4 | Yavir Krasnopillia | 8 | 0 | 1 | 7 | 4 | 11 | −7 | 1 | |

Source: RSSSF

=== Group E ===
| Pos | Team | Pld | W | D | L | GF | GA | GD | Pts | Qualification |
|---|---|---|---|---|---|---|---|---|---|---|
| 1 | ZALK Zaporizhia | 4 | 3 | 1 | 0 | 5 | 3 | +2 | 10 | Second Stage |
| 2 | Stal Dniprodzerzhynsk | 4 | 2 | 1 | 1 | 5 | 4 | +1 | 7 | joined Druha Liha |
| 3 | SVKh Danika Simferopol | 4 | 0 | 0 | 4 | 2 | 5 | −3 | 0 | withdrew |

Source: RSSSF

Note: Stal Dniprodzerzhynsk decided to join Druha Liha.
SVKh Danika Simferopol and KDPU Mekhanizator Komyshuvate withdrew. KDPU Mekhanizator Komyshuvate results were annulled.

=== Group F ===
| Pos | Team | Pld | W | D | L | GF | GA | GD | Pts | Qualification |
|---|---|---|---|---|---|---|---|---|---|---|
| 1 | Shakhtar Luhansk | 6 | 4 | 1 | 1 | 20 | 5 | +15 | 13 | Second Stage |
| 2 | VAVK Volodymyrivka | 6 | 4 | 0 | 2 | 11 | 3 | +8 | 12 | Second Stage |
| 3 | Batkivschyna Kryvyi Rih | 6 | 2 | 1 | 3 | 6 | 6 | 0 | 7 | Second Stage |
| 4 | Metalurh Komsomolske | 6 | 1 | 0 | 5 | 4 | 27 | −23 | 3 | |

Source: RSSSF

Note: Olympik Kharkiv withdrew and its results were annulled.
Batkivschyna Kryvyi Rih qualified for the Second Stage, but later withdrew.

=== Group G ===
| Pos | Team | Pld | W | D | L | GF | GA | GD | Pts | Qualification |
|---|---|---|---|---|---|---|---|---|---|---|
| 1 | Vuhlyk Dymytrov | 4 | 3 | 1 | 0 | 8 | 3 | +5 | 10 | Second Stage |
| 2 | Orion Dnipropetrovsk | 4 | 0 | 3 | 1 | 1 | 4 | −3 | 3 | Second Stage |
| 3 | Monolit Konstantynivka | 4 | 0 | 2 | 2 | 2 | 4 | −2 | 2 | Second Stage |

Source: RSSSF

Note: Ekina Almazna withdrew and its results were annulled.

=== Group H ===
| Pos | Team | Pld | W | D | L | GF | GA | GD | Pts | Qualification |
|---|---|---|---|---|---|---|---|---|---|---|
| 1 | Dnister Ovidiopol | 6 | 4 | 1 | 1 | 9 | 3 | +6 | 13 | joined Druha Liha |
| 2 | Kolos Stepove | 6 | 4 | 0 | 2 | 7 | 7 | 0 | 12 | Second Stage |
| 3 | Tyras-2500 Bilhorod-Dnistrovskyi | 6 | 3 | 0 | 3 | 9 | 7 | +2 | 9 | Second Stage |
| 3 | Herkules Novoukrainka | 6 | 0 | 1 | 5 | 1 | 9 | −8 | 1 | |

Source: RSSSF

== Second stage ==
=== Group 1 ===
| Pos | Team | Pld | W | D | L | GF | GA | GD | Pts | Qualification |
|---|---|---|---|---|---|---|---|---|---|---|
| 1 | Luzhany | 10 | 8 | 0 | 2 | 21 | 9 | +12 | 24 | Semifinals |
| 2 | Kovel-Volyn Kovel | 10 | 7 | 0 | 3 | 17 | 10 | +7 | 21 | Semifinals |
| 3 | Fakel Varva | 10 | 5 | 2 | 3 | 12 | 11 | +1 | 17 | |
| 4 | Budivelnyk-Nyva Hnivan | 10 | 5 | 0 | 5 | 12 | 22 | −10 | 15 | |
| 5 | Nyva-Tekstylnyk Dunaivtsi | 10 | 2 | 2 | 6 | 5 | 7 | −2 | 8 | |
| 6 | Lysonia Berezhany | 10 | 0 | 2 | 8 | 2 | 10 | −8 | 2 | |

Source: RSSSF

=== Group 2 ===
| Pos | Team | Pld | W | D | L | GF | GA | GD | Pts | Qualification |
|---|---|---|---|---|---|---|---|---|---|---|
| 1 | Evropa Pryliuky | 8 | 5 | 2 | 1 | 11 | 4 | +7 | 17 | Semifinals |
| 2 | Systema-KKhP Cherniakhiv | 8 | 5 | 2 | 1 | 8 | 3 | +5 | 17 | Semifinals |
| 3 | Nizhyn | 8 | 3 | 4 | 1 | 9 | 3 | +6 | 13 | |
| 4 | Titan Irshansk | 8 | 2 | 2 | 4 | 5 | 8 | −3 | 8 | |
| 5 | Dnipro Kyiv | 8 | 0 | 0 | 8 | 4 | 19 | −15 | 0 | |

Source: RSSSF

Note: Yavir VolynLis Tsuman withdrew and its results were annulled.

=== Group 3 ===
| Pos | Team | Pld | W | D | L | GF | GA | GD | Pts | Qualification |
|---|---|---|---|---|---|---|---|---|---|---|
| 1 | Shakhtar Luhansk | 8 | 7 | 0 | 1 | 18 | 4 | +14 | 21 | Semifinals |
| 2 | Monolit Kostyantynivka | 8 | 4 | 2 | 2 | 11 | 10 | +1 | 14 | Semifinals |
| 3 | Zemliak Myrhorod | 8 | 3 | 3 | 2 | 6 | 7 | −1 | 12 | |
| 4 | Orion Dnipropetrovsk | 8 | 1 | 1 | 6 | 2 | 12 | −10 | 4 | |
| 5 | VAVK Volodymyrivka | 8 | 0 | 4 | 4 | 2 | 6 | −4 | 4 | |

Source: RSSSF

Note: Zemliak Myrhorod replaced Batkivschyna Kryvyi Rih.

=== Group 4 ===
| Pos | Team | Pld | W | D | L | GF | GA | GD | Pts | Qualification |
|---|---|---|---|---|---|---|---|---|---|---|
| 1 | ZALK Zaporizhia | 6 | 4 | 0 | 2 | 14 | 8 | +6 | 12 | Semifinals |
| 2 | Vuhlyk Dymytrov | 6 | 3 | 0 | 3 | 4 | 6 | −2 | 9 | Semifinals |
| 3 | Tyras-2500 Bilhorod-Dnistrovskyi | 6 | 3 | 0 | 3 | 10 | 5 | +5 | 9 | withdrew |
| 4 | Kolos Stepove | 6 | 2 | 0 | 4 | 8 | 17 | −9 | 6 | |

Source: RSSSF

Note: Tyras-2500 Bilhorod-Dnistrovskyi withdrew.

== Semifinals ==
=== Group 1 ===
| Pos | Team | Pld | W | D | L | GF | GA | GD | Pts | Qualification |
|---|---|---|---|---|---|---|---|---|---|---|
| 1 | Monolit Konstantinivka | 3 | 2 | 1 | 0 | 7 | 4 | +3 | 7 | Final |
| 2 | Luzhany | 3 | 1 | 2 | 0 | 5 | 4 | +1 | 5 | Final |
| 3 | ZALK Zaporizhia | 3 | 0 | 2 | 1 | 2 | 4 | −2 | 2 | |
| 4 | Systema-KKhP Cherniakhiv | 3 | 0 | 1 | 2 | 0 | 2 | −2 | 1 | |

Source: RSSSF

=== Group 2 ===
| Pos | Team | Pld | W | D | L | GF | GA | GD | Pts | Qualification |
|---|---|---|---|---|---|---|---|---|---|---|
| 1 | Shakhtar Luhansk | 3 | 3 | 0 | 0 | 8 | 1 | +7 | 9 | Final |
| 2 | Vuhlyk Dymytrov | 3 | 1 | 1 | 1 | 2 | 3 | −1 | 4 | Final |
| 3 | Kovel-Volyn Kovel | 3 | 1 | 0 | 2 | 4 | 5 | −1 | 3 | |
| 4 | Evropa Pryliuky | 3 | 0 | 1 | 2 | 0 | 5 | −5 | 1 | |

Source: RSSSF

== Final Group ==
| Pos | Team | Pld | W | D | L | GF | GA | GD | Pts | Qualification |
|---|---|---|---|---|---|---|---|---|---|---|
| 1 | Shakhtar Luhansk | 2 | 2 | 0 | 0 | 10 | 1 | +9 | 6 | Champion |
| 2 | Monolit Kostyantynivka | 2 | 0 | 2 | 0 | 3 | 3 | 0 | 2 | |
| 3 | Vuhlyk Dymytrov | 2 | 0 | 1 | 1 | 1 | 3 | −2 | 1 | |
| 4 | Luzhany | 2 | 0 | 1 | 1 | 3 | 10 | −7 | 1 | |

Source: RSSSF

Note: No further games were necessary as the champion was identified.

A permission to apply for the Second League for the next 2002-03 season was granted to Shakhtar Luhansk, Vuhlyk Dymytrov, and Systema-KKhP Cherniakhiv.

== Number of teams by region ==
| Number | Region | Team(s) |
|---|---|---|
| 4 | Donetsk Oblast | Metalurh Komsomolske, Monolit Kostiantynivka, VAVK Volodymyrivka, Vuhlyk Dymytrov |
| 3 | Chernihiv Oblast | Fakel Varva, FC Nizhyn, Yevropa Pryluky |
| 3 | Dnipropetrovsk Oblast | Orion Dnipropetrovsk, Rodina Kryvyi Rih, Stal Dniprodzerzhynsk |
| 2 | Chernivtsi Oblast | FC Luzhany, Bukovyna-2 Chernivtsi |
| 2 | Kirovohrad Oblast | Herkules Novoukrainka, KDPU-Mekhanizator Kamyshuvate |
| 2 | Luhansk Oblast | Ekina Almazna, Shakhtar Luhansk |
| 2 | Odesa Oblast | Dnister Ovidiopol, Tyras-2500 Bilhorod-Dnistrovskyi |
| 2 | Rivne Oblast | Metalist Zdolbuniv, Sokil Radyvyliv |
| 2 | Volyn Oblast | FC Kovel, Yavir-Volynlis Tsuman |
| 2 | Zhytomyr Oblast | KKhP Chernyakhiv, Tytan Irshansk |
| 1 | Autonomous Republic of Crimea | SVKh-Danyka Simferopol |
| 1 | Cherkasy Oblast | FC Drabiv |
| 1 | Kharkiv Oblast | Olimpik Kharkiv |
| 1 | Khmelnytskyi Oblast | Nyva-Tekstylnyk Dunaivtsi |
| 1 | Kyiv | Dnipro |
| 1 | Lviv Oblast | SKA-Orbita Lviv |
| 1 | Mykolaiv Oblast | Kolos Stepove |
| 1 | Sumy Oblast | Yavir Krasnopillia |
| 1 | Ternopil Oblast | Lysonia Berezhany |
| 1 | Vinnytsia Oblast | Budivelnyk-Nyva Hnivan |
| 1 | Zaporizhia Oblast | ZAlK Zaporizhia |
