= Vasyl Sachko =

Ukrainian footballer (born 1975)

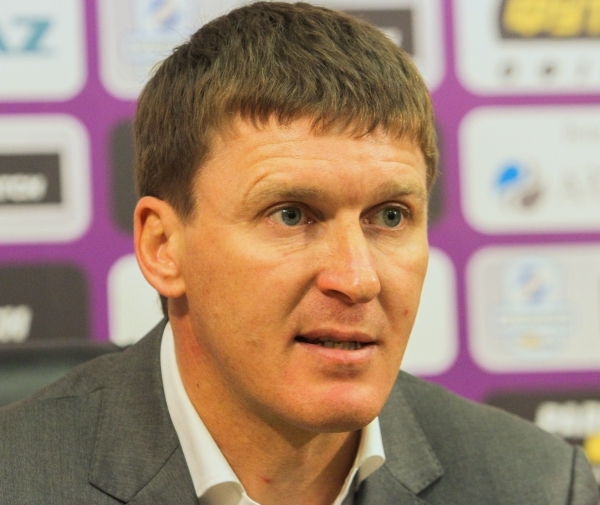

Personal information
- Full name: Vasyl Viktorovych Sachko
- Date of birth: 3 May 1975 (age 51)
- Place of birth: Staromlynivka, Ukrainian SSR
- Height: 1.90 m (6 ft 3 in)
- Position: Forward

Senior career*
Years	Team	Apps	(Gls)
1997–1998	Shakhta Ukraina Ukrainsk		
1998	Tavriya Simferopol	5	(0)
1999–2000	Shakhta Ukraina Ukrainsk		
2000	Monolit Kostiantynivka		
2000–2001	Oskil Kupiansk	28	(13)
2001–2006	Volyn Lutsk	148	(57)
2006–2008	Kryvbas Kryvyi Rih	58	(10)
2008–2012	Vorskla Poltava	83	(18)
Total		322	(98)

Managerial career
- 2012–2014: Vorskla Poltava (assistant)
- 2014–2019: Vorskla Poltava
- 2020–2021: Volyn Lutsk
- * Club domestic league appearances and goals

Vasyl Viktorovych Sachko (Ukrainian: Василь Вікторович Сачко; born 3 May 1975) is a Ukrainian football manager and former player. He played as a forward.

== Career ==
A native of Eastern Ukraine, Sachko started to play football in a local sports school of Velyka Novosilka Raion. His first coach was Volodymyr Lypovyi. After finishing the obligatory military service in Simferopol, Sachko was not certain about his future and ended up in the city of Ukrainsk which is part of Selydove.

Until 2000 Sachko played primarily in amateur competitions for several clubs from Donetsk Oblast except for a short stint in 1998 when he defended colors of SC Tavriya Simferopol in the Vyshcha Liha. After Tavriya he returned to Shakhta Ukraina. While playing in Ukrainsk, Sachko also worked in local militsiya since amateur clubs do not pay their players. With Shakhta Ukraina coached by Viktor Hrachov, Sachko managed to win the Ukrainian Amateur Cup by beating Volhynian team "Troianda-Ekspres".

In 2000 he joined the Second League Oskil Kupiansk and after a season received several offers from other professional clubs such as Naftovyk Okhtyrka, but chose to play for Volyn Lutsk.

While playing in Kryvbas Kryvyi Rih, Sachko carried the captain's badge 22 times. Unable to find a regular spot in the starting squad, Sachko, with the approval of the Kryvbas officials, received a free agent status and on Wednesday, 20 August 2008 he moved to Vorskla Poltava.

Since 2014 till 2019, he worked as manager of Vorskla Poltava.
