= Valentyn Kryachko =

Ukrainian footballer (born 1958)

Personal information
- Full name: Valentyn Mykolayovych Kryachko
- Date of birth: 27 January 1958 (age 68)
- Place of birth: Komsomolske, Ukrainian SSR
- Height: 1.73 m (5 ft 8 in)
- Position: Defender

Youth career
- KhOSShISP Kharkiv

Senior career*
Years	Team	Apps	(Gls)
1975–1981	FC Metalist Kharkiv	193	(1)
1982	SKA Kiev	36	(1)
1983	FC Metalist Kharkiv	3	(0)
1984	FC Mayak Kharkiv	36	(0)
1985–1986	FC Metalist Kharkiv	27	(0)
1987	FC Start Kharkiv		
1988	FC Tsementnik Balakliia		
1989	FC Luch Kharkiv		
1989	FC Metallurg Stary Oskol (amateur)		
1990	FC Ritm Belgorod (amateur)		
1991–1992	FC Ritm Belgorod	82	(0)
1993	FC Salyut Belgorod	30	(0)
1993	FC Donbaskraft Kramatorsk	2	(0)
1994	FC Metalist Kharkiv	2	(0)
1996	FC Enerhetyk Komsomolske		
1997–1998	FC Salyut-YuKOS Belgorod	43	(0)

Managerial career
- 1986–1989: FC Metalist Kharkiv (academy)
- 1993–1994: FC Metalist Kharkiv (assistant)
- 1994–1995: FC Temp Shepetivka (assistant)
- 1995: FC Temp-Advis Khmelnytskyi
- 1998–2001: FC Arsenal Kharkiv
- 2001–2002: FC Metalist Kharkiv (assistant)
- 2002–2003: FC Metalist Kharkiv
- 2003: FC Helios Kharkiv
- 2016–2017: WFC Zhytlobud-1 Kharkiv
Medal record
Men's football
Representing Soviet Union
FIFA U-20 World Cup
Winner	1977 Tunisia
- * Club domestic league appearances and goals

Valentyn Mykolayovych Kryachko (Ukrainian: Валентин Миколайович Крячко; born 27 January 1958) is a Ukrainian football coach and a former player.

== Honours ==
- 1977 FIFA World Youth Championship winner with the Soviet Union.
