= FC Uholyok Myrnohrad =

- Full name: Football Club Uholyok Myrnohrad
- Founded: 1992
- Dissolved: 2010
- Ground: Shakhtar Stadion, Myrnohrad
- Capacity: ~6,000
- League: Ukrainian Second League
- 2004–05: 8th

FC Uholyok Myrnohrad (Ukrainian: Угольок Мирноград), formerly FC Uholyok Dymytov (Ukrainian: Угольок Димитров) was a professional football club based in Myrnohrad, Donetsk Oblast, Ukraine.

== History ==
The club was formed in 1992 as Vuhlyk Dymytrov (Ukrainian: Вуглик Димитров) and initially competed in the Donetsk Oblast competition including the Oblast Cup.

The team also participated in 2001 in the Ukrainian Football Amateur League.

The club was granted a professional license and debuted in the 2002–03 Ukrainian Second League competition. The team struggled for two seasons. Prior to the start of 2004–05 Ukrainian Second League season the club renamed themselves to Uholyok.

The club withdrew their licence from the PFL before the start of the 2005–06 season citing financial difficulties.

Uholyok continued to participate in the amateur competitions winning the Krasnoarmieyskiy Krayy Kubok in 2009 but the team disappear from the football map after 2010.

== League and cup history ==
Season	Div.	Pos.	Pl.	W	D	L	GS	GA	P	Domestic Cup	Europe	Notes
2002–03	3rd "C"	14	28	5	8	15	12	37	23	1/32 finals		as Vuhlyk Dymytrov
2003–04	3rd "C"	14	30	5	4	21	18	61	19	1/32 finals		as Vuhlyk Dymytrov
2004–05	3rd "C"	8	28	8	7	13	36	47	31	1/32 finals		as Uholyok Dymytrov
