= Water Polo Federation of Ukraine =

The Water Polo Federation of Ukraine (Ukrainian: Федерація водного поло України (FVPU), "Ukrainian Water Polo Federation of Ukraine") is a Ukrainian public organization whose goal is to develop water polo in Ukraine. The Federation organizes official water polo competitions and is an affiliated member of FINA and LEN – the International Swimming Federation and the European Swimming Federation. It cooperates with the National Olympic Committee, as well as other Ukrainian and international sports organizations. The activities of the Federation is guided by the Charter, the new version of which was approved on March 13, 2020.

The Water Polo Federation of Ukraine was officially registered by the Ministry of Justice of Ukraine on July 8, 2005.

Since June 17, 2021, the president of the Federation has been Oleksandr Yuriyovych Svishchov, president of the water polo club, Dynamo, which is in Lviv. Oleksandr Kucherenko, who headed the Federation since 2000, was elected honorary president of the organization.

== History ==
Water polo, as an independent sport, had been developing in Ukraine for more than 100 years. It has been believed that Kharkov was the first center for the development of water polo in Ukraine - it is said that already in 1908, Kharkov athletes took part in all-Russian competitions, but there is no documentary evidence of this.

On July 26, 1914, in Lviv, on Pelchinsky Ponds, water polo competitions were held with the participation of athletes from the Lviv sports club "Погонь" - an article about this match was published in the newspaper "Курьер Львовский" on July 27, 1914. However, the further development of water polo in Lviv was delayed due to the outbreak of the First World War.

During the period between World War I and World War II, in the Ukrainian SSR, the development of water polo resumed in Kharkov. One proponent of the sport was the teacher Ivan Viktorovich Vrzhesnevsky, who became the rector of the institute after the end of the war. In the last pre-war championship of the Soviet Union, Kharkov water polo players won in the 2nd group. At the same time, 34 water polo teams participated in the championship of Kiev. After 1938, the Kiev club "Vodnik" participated in the Water polo championships of the USSR.

In the post-war years, the main centers for the development of water polo in Ukraine were Kiev, Kharkov, Lvov, Sevastopol, and Uzhhorod. In particular, teams were restored in Kiev (Nauka, Vodnik, Dynamo, Spartak, Bolshevik, SKIF), in Lvov (Dynamo, Spartak), and in Kharkov (Dynamo). Since 1945, teams from Kyiv and Lvov have taken part in the USSR championships. In the 1970s, Kiev's Dynamo team won the silver and bronze medals of the championship of the USSR several times. In 1974 and 1975, Ukrainian teams won bronze medals of the USSR Championship - silver in 1976 and bronze in 1977. During this period was the victory of Dynamo Kyiv in the USSR Cup in 1980. Dynamo Lviv in 1989 and 1991 won bronze medals in the USSR championship, and was also twice a finalist in the USSR Cup.

In 1991, Ukrainian clubs interrupted their performances in the last USSR championship, held in Kyiv. In the spring of 1992, a short transitional championship of Ukraine took place with the participation of seven teams: Kyiv and Lviv Dynamo, Lokomotiv Kharkiv, Azov-Mariupol, Polygraphist Lvov, the team of the Black Sea Fleet of Sevastopol. In the autumn of 1992, the 2nd Water polo Championship of Ukraine began, which was held according to the autumn-spring system. Also in 1992, the championships of Ukraine among women, youths of all ages, and cup competitions started. At the same time, the Water Polo Federation of Ukraine was created, which until 2005 operated without legal registration.

On November 28, 2021, the Ukrainian national team became the winner of the League of Nations international tournament held in the Czech Republic for the first time in the team's history.

== Notable Ukrainian water polo players ==
- Avdeev, Mikhail Mikhailovich (born 1931), Honored Coach of the USSR
- Boyko, Alexander Yuryevich (born 1942), Honored Coach of the USSR, in 1981 and 1985 led the youth team of the USSR, which won the World and European Championships
- Gaydayenko, Yuriy Mikhailovich (November 29, 1949 - September 6, 2018), Honored Coach of Ukraine.
- Martynchik, Vadim (January 10, 1934 - September 1, 2010), Dynamo Lviv, Honored Coach of the Ukrainian SSR, Honored Worker of Physical Culture and Sports of Ukraine
- Pinsky, Gennady Naumovich (1932–2017), Dynamo Lviv, Honored Coach of the USSR

== Books ==
- Рыжак, Михаил, ed. (2002). Водное поло. История развития игры в СССР и в России [Water polo. The history of the development of the game in the USSR and in Russia] (in Russian). Vol. 1. Moscow: ЗАО «Олимпийская панорама».
