= Nova Bavaria Stadium =

Football stadium in Kharkiv, Ukraine

Nova Bavaria
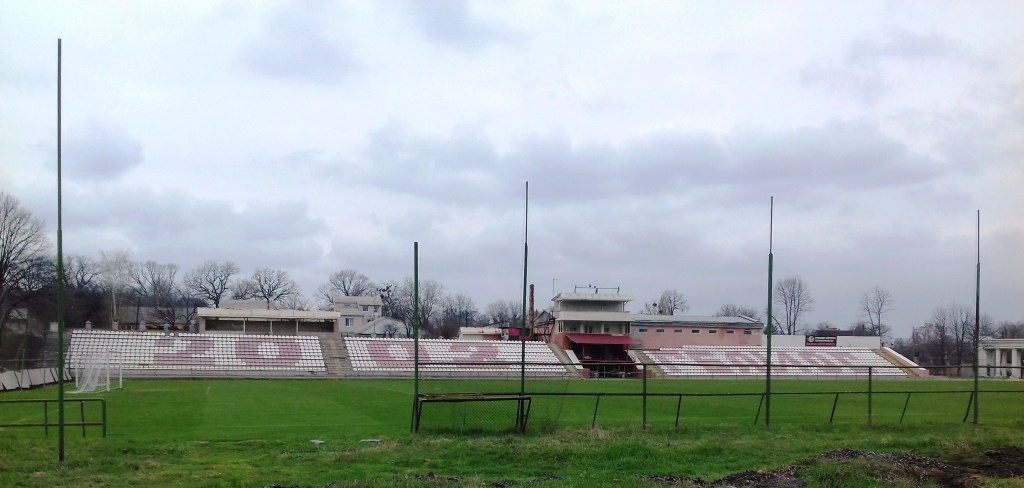
- Interactive map of Nova Bavaria
- Former names: Helios Arena; Arsenal–Bavaria Stadium; Rope Factory Stadium
- Location: Novobavarskyi District, Kharkiv, Ukraine
- Coordinates: 49°57′00″N 36°10′48″E
- Owner: Rope Factory ( –1991); FC Arsenal Kharkiv ( –2009); FC Helios Kharkiv (2009–2018); Nova Bavaria sports school
- Capacity: 2,057
- Surface: Grass
- Field size: 105 m × 68 m (115 yd × 74 yd)

Construction
- Renovated: 2004

Tenants
- FC Arsenal Kharkiv (2004–2009); FC Helios Kharkiv (2009–2018); WFC Zhytlobud-2 Kharkiv

Nova Bavaria is a small football stadium in the city of Kharkiv, Ukraine. Until 2020, it was known as Helios Arena.

== History ==
The stadium is among the oldest in the city and initially was called Stadion Kanatnoho Zavodu (Rope Factory Stadium). It is located in a historic neighborhood Nova Bavaria. In 1982-1991 it was used by the Soviet club FC Mayak Kharkiv.

Later around 2000 belonged to FC Arsenal Kharkiv which in 2004 updated the stadium that by that time was falling apart. It was renamed as Arsenal–Bavaria stadium. In 2004-2009 the stadium was used as a home field of Arsenal Kharkiv.

In 2009 it was acquired by FC Helios Kharkiv and was renamed as Helios–Arena. In 2009-2012 it was used by Helios as a home turf. After Helios moved to the newly built Sonyachnyi stadium located up north of the city, since 2012 the stadium was used for training. Since 2017 Helios Arena once again became a home to Helios.

== Gallery ==
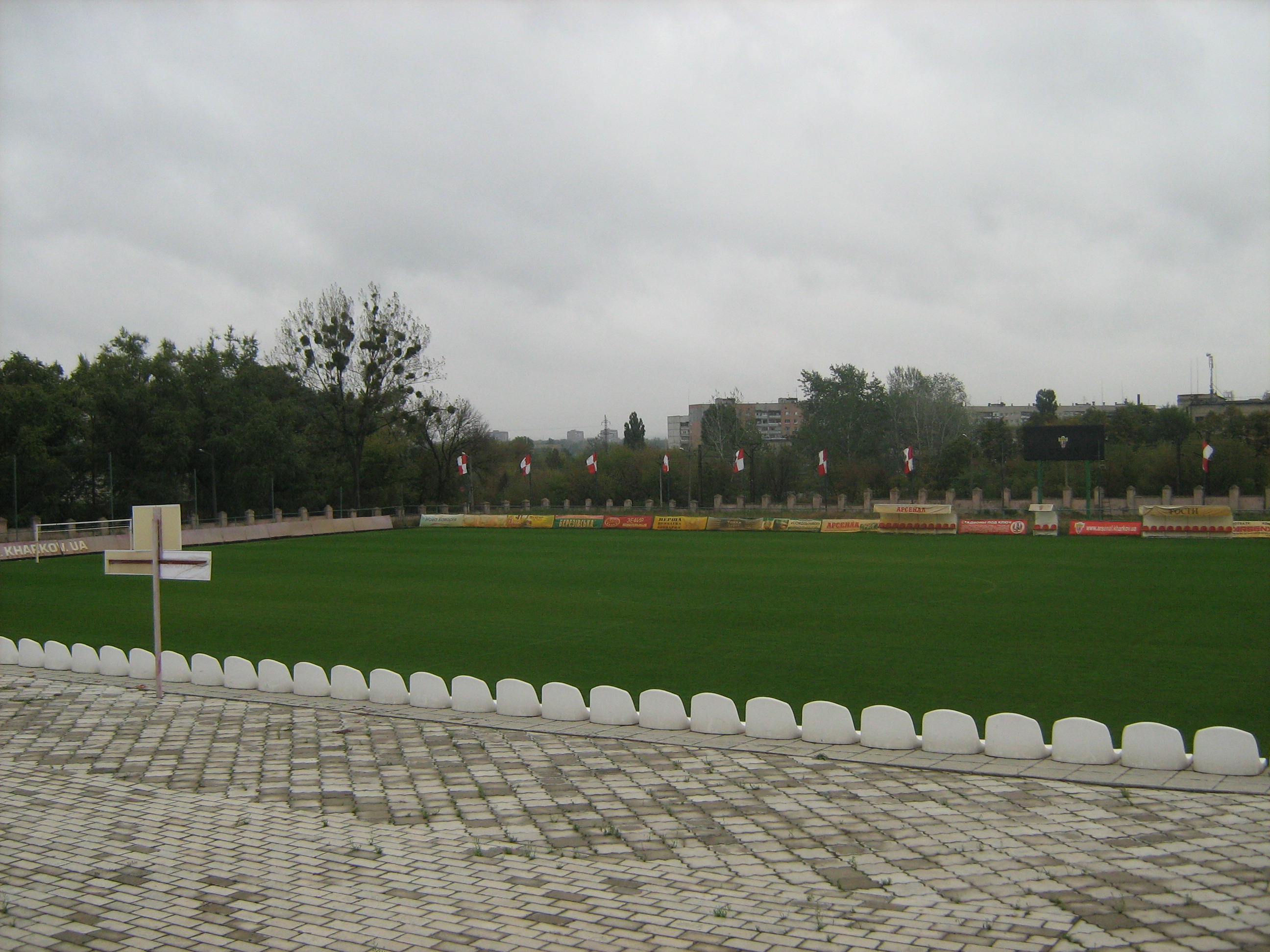
Over the stand

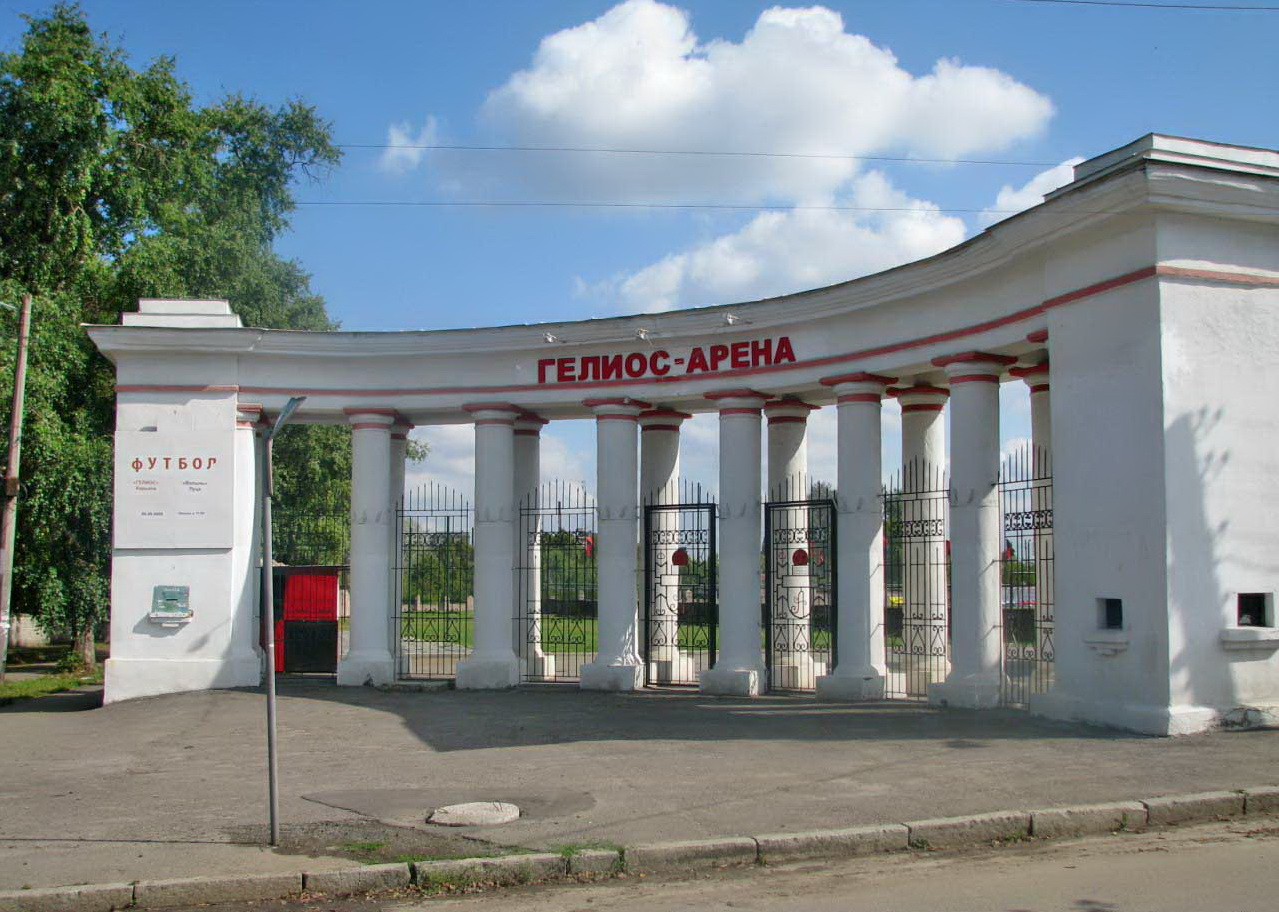
Entrance with columns

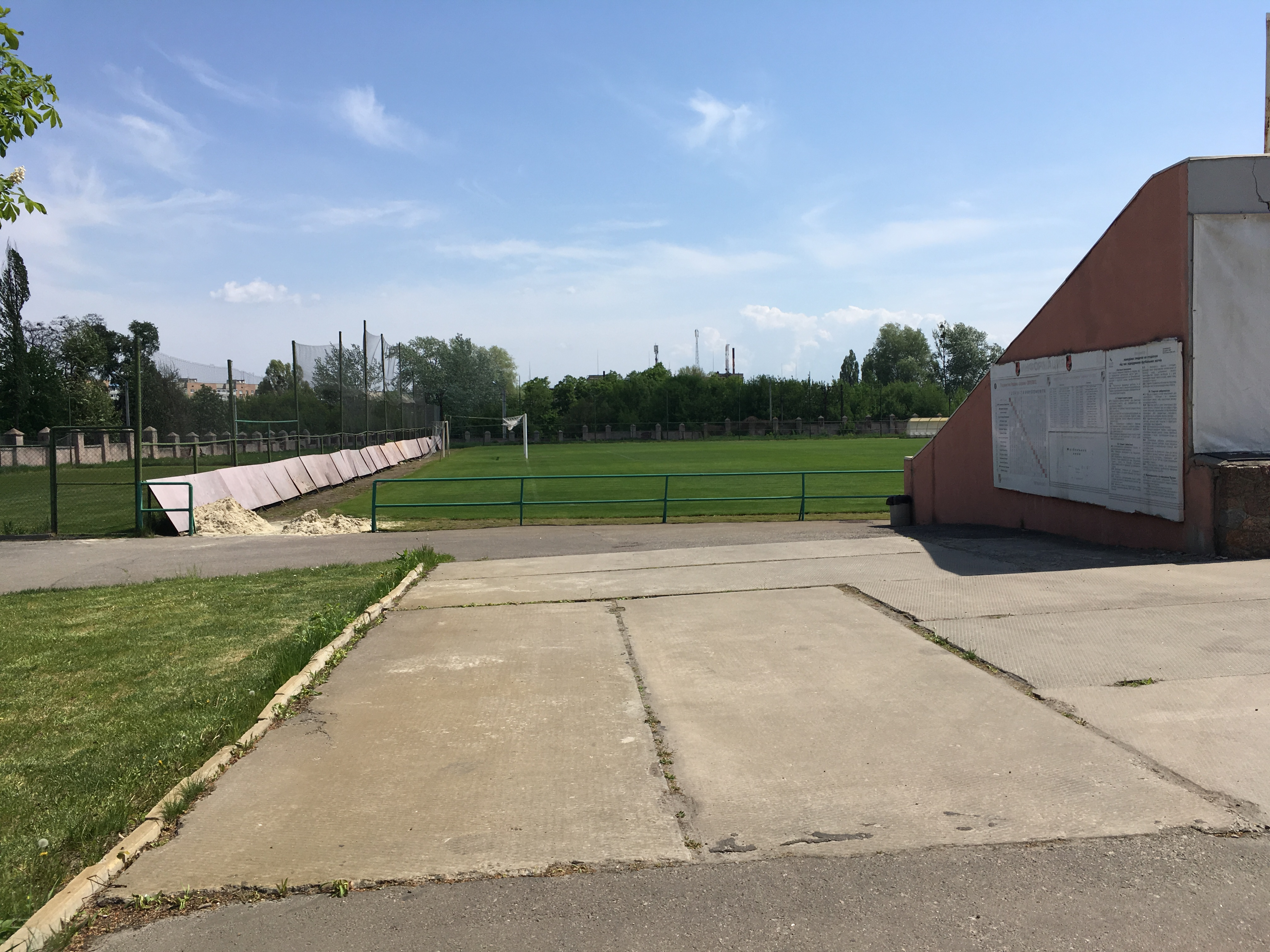
Sideview
