= 1999 Ukrainian Amateur Cup =

1999 Ukrainian Cup among amateurs
Tournament details
- Country: Ukraine

Final positions
- Champions: Shakhta Ukraina Ukrainsk
- Runners-up: Troyanda-Ekspres Hirka Polonka

The 1999 Ukrainian Amateur Cup was the fourth annual season of Ukraine's football knockout competition for amateur football teams. The competition started on 6 September 1999 and concluded on 16 October 1999.

The competition shifted to spring-fall system (within a single calendar year) along with competition in championship.

The cup holders HPZ Varva were defeated at semifinals by Shakhta Ukraina Ukrainsk.

== Participated clubs ==
In bold are clubs that are active at the same season AAFU championship (parallel round-robin competition).

- Chernihiv Oblast (1): **HPZ Varva**
- Donetsk Oblast (1): Shakhta Ukraina Ukrainsk
- Ivano-Frankivsk Oblast (1): Korona Ivano-Frankivsk
- Kharkiv Oblast (1): **Krystal Parkhomivka**
- Khmelnytskyi Oblast (1): Dynamo-Orbita Kamianets-Podilskyi
- Kyiv Oblast (1): Chaika Vyshhorod
- Lviv Oblast (1): Rochyn Sosnivka
- Luhansk Oblast (1): Ekina Almazna
- Odesa Oblast (1): Syhnal Odesa
- Poltava Oblast (1): Psel Hadiach
- Sumy Oblast (1): Naftovyk-2 Okhtyrka
- Ternopil Oblast (1): **Sokil-Orion Velyki Hayi**
- Volyn Oblast (1): Troyanda-Ekspres Hirka Polonka

Notes

- Thirteen regions did not provide any teams for the tournament, among which were Crimea, the oblasts of Cherkasy, Chernivtsi, Dnipropetrovsk, Kherson, Kirovohrad, Mykolaiv, Rivne, Vinnytsia, Zakarpattia, Zaporizhia, Zhytomyr, and Kyiv City.

== Bracket ==
The following is the bracket that demonstrates the last four rounds of the Ukrainian Cup, including the final match. Numbers in parentheses next to the match score represent the results of a penalty shoot-out.

First round
Korona Ivano-Frankivsk	**1**	1	2
**Dynamo-Orbita Kamianets-Podilsky**	0	**4**	**4**
**Rochyn Sosnivka**	+
Sokil-Orion Velyki Hayi	-
Psyol Hadiach	1	0	1
**Naftovyk-2 Okhtyrka**	1	**2**	**3**
**HPZ Varva**	**2**	0	**2**
Krystal Parkhomivka	0	0	0
Ekina Almazna	1	0	1
**Shakhta Ukraina Ukrainsk**	1	**1**	**2**

Quarter-finals
Chaika Vyshhorod	**1**	1	2
**Troyanda-Ekspres Hirka Polonka**	0	**4**	**4**
**Dynamo-Orbita Kamianets-Podilskyi**	+
Rochyn Sosnivka	-
Naftovyk-2 Okhtyrka	2	1	3
**HPZ Varva** (a)	2	1	3
**Shakhta Ukraina Ukrainsk**	**2**	**4**	**6**
Syhnal Odesa	1	3	4

Semi-finals
Dynamo-Orbita Kamianets-Podilskyi	3	0	3
**Troyanda-Ekspres Hirka Polonka**	3	**2**	**5**
HPZ Varva	**1**	0	1
**Shakhta Ukraina Ukrainsk**	0	**2**	**2**

Final
**Shakhta Ukraina Ukrainsk**	**2**	1	**3**
Troyanda-Ekspres Hirka Polonka	0	**2**	2

== Competition schedule ==
=== First qualification round ===
Team 1	Agg.	Team 2	1st leg	2nd leg
Korona Ivano-Frankivsk	2–4	**Dynamo-Orbita Kamianets-Podilsky**	1–0	1–4
Psyol Hadiach	1–3	**Naftovyk-2 Okhtyrka**	1–1	0–2
**HPZ Varva**	2–0	Krystal Parkhomivka	2–0	0–0
Ekina Almazna	1–2	**Shakhta Ukraina Ukrainsk**	1–1	0–1
**Rochyn Sosnivka**	w/o	Sokil-Orion Velyki Hayi	—	—

- Chaika Vyshhorod, Syhnal Odesa, and Troyanda-Ekspres Hirka Polonka received a bye to the next round.

=== Quarterfinals (1/4) ===
Team 1	Agg.	Team 2	1st leg	2nd leg
Chaika Vyshhorod	2–4	**Troyanda-Ekspres Hirka Polonka**	1–0	1–4
**Dynamo-Orbita Kamianets-Podilskyi**	w/o	Rochyn Sosnivka	—	—
Naftovyk-2 Okhtyrka	3–3 (a)	**HPZ Varva**	2–2	1–1
**Shakhta Ukraina Ukrainsk**	6–4	Syhnal Odesa	2–1	4–3

=== Semifinals (1/2) ===
Team 1	Agg.	Team 2	1st leg	2nd leg
Dynamo-Orbita Kamianets-Podilskyi	3–5	**Troyanda-Ekspres Hirka Polonka**	3–3	0–2
HPZ Varva	1–2	**Shakhta Ukraina Ukrainsk**	1–0	0–2

=== Final ===
Team 1	Agg.	Team 2	1st leg	2nd leg
**Shakhta Ukraina Ukrainsk**	3–2	Troyanda-Ekspres Hirka Polonka	2–0	1–2

Winner of the 1999 Ukrainian Football Cup among amateur teams
**Shakhta Ukraina Ukrainsk (Donetsk Oblast)**; **1st time**

== See also ==
- 1999 Ukrainian Football Amateur League
- 1999–2000 Ukrainian Cup
- 1999–2000 Ukrainian Second League Cup
