= FC Psel Hadiach =

Ukrainian football club from Hadiach, Ukraine

Psel
- Full name: Football Club Psel Hadiach
- Founded: 1988
- Ground: Kolos Stadium, Hadiach
- President: Vasyl Vanda

Football Club Psel Hadiach (Ukrainian: Футбольний клуб Псел (Гадяч); is a Ukrainian football team based in Hadiach, Ukraine.

== History ==
Club was formed in 1988 by Poltavanaftohaz Nhvu, PoltavaGasVydobuvannia Gas Production Division and Kachanivskyi Hazopererobnyi Zavod Vat "Ukrnafta". Psel won the Poltava Oblast Championship in 1991.

== Name change ==
- 1988 – February 2002 Psel Hadiach
- February 2002 – 2004 Naftovyk-Psel Hadiach
- 2004 – 2013 Psel Hadiach
- 2013 – 2014 Psel-Raiz Hadiach
- 2014 – present Psel Hadiach

== League and cup history ==
Season	Div.	Pos.	Pl.	W	D	L	GS	GA	P	Domestic Cup	Notes
1990	Regional	5	28	15	4	9	70	49	34		Group 1
1991	Regional	1	22	19	1	2	-	-	39		Group 1
1992	Regional	1	14	10	2	2	50	25	22		Group 1 (Northern Zone)
1992	Regional	3	3	1	0	2	4	4	2		Group 1 (Final Tournament)
1992–93	Regional	2	26	18	4	4	-	-	40		Group 1
1993–94	Regional	4	22	14	2	6	-	-	30		Group 1
1994–95	Regional	4	32	20	6	6	-	-	78		Group 1
1995–96	Regional	3	18	-	-	-	-	-	43		Group 2 (Northern Zone)
1995–96	Regional	3	2	0	0	2	2	10	0		Group 1 (Final Tournament)
1996–97	Regional	1	26	19	3	4	74	21	67		Group 1
1997–98	Regional	1	22	15	5	2	52	15	57		League 1
1998–99	Regional	1	24	20	3	1	60	18	67		League 1
1999–2000	Regional	1	19	14	1	4	36	13	43		League 1
2000–01	Regional	2	18	12	1	5	30	18	37		League 1
2001–02	Regional	3	16	10	3	3	37	12	33		League 1
2002	4th	1	8	3	5	0	10	3	14		Group 3 (First Stage)
2002	4th	1	8	4	2	0	6	3	14		Group 4 (Second Stage)
2002	4th	4	3	0	2	1	1	2	2		Group 2 (Semifinal Stage)
2002	4th	5	Walkover								5th place match

== Honours ==
Poltava Oblast Champions

- Winners (5): 1991, 1996–97, 1997–98, 1998–99, 1999–2000
- Runners-up (2): 1992–93, 2000–01
- Third Place (4): 1992, 2001–02, 2002–03, 2004–05

Poltava Oblast Cup

- Winners (3): 1998–99, 1999–2000, 2002–03
- Runners-up (2): 1996–97, 2001–02

== Sources ==
- Lomov, Anatolii; Stadnychenko, Oleksandr (2009), 100 Років Полтавському Футболу [100 Years of Poltava Football] (in Ukrainian), Poltava: Poltava, ISBN 978-966-97035-0-7
