= 1998–99 Football Championship of Poltava Oblast =

Football Championship of Poltava Oblast
- Season: 1998-99
- Champions: Psel Hadiach

The 1998–99 Football Championship of Poltava Oblast was won by two-time defending champions Psel Hadiach, who successfully defended the title, earning their fourth title.

Points were awarded as follows: 3 for a win, 2 for a draw and 1 for a loss. Kremin-2 Kremenchuk replaced another team from Kremenchuk Naftotrans-Polo during first half of season. However the team withdrew 7 rounds before the end of the season. Also, in second half of season Adoms Kremenchuk replaced Budivelnyk Shyshaky which withdrew after first half.

== Second League ==
Eighteen teams took part in Second League group stage. They were split into two zones, with two top teams from each group advancing into the play-off stage. Both winners of the play-off matches gained promotion to the next years First league. The promoted teams were Semenivka and Start from Stasi.

== League table ==
Pos	Team	Pld	W	D	L	GF	GA	GD	Pts	
1	Psel Hadiach (C)	24	20	3	1	60	18	+42	67	Champion
2	Pyriatyn	24	16	3	5	30	20	+10	59	
3	Lokomotyv Hrebinka	24	14	6	4	36	20	+16	58	
4	Sula Lubny	24	13	7	4	44	24	+20	57	
5	Kharchovyk Chervonozavodske	24	11	3	10	38	42	−4	49	
6	Kombi Poltava	24	10	3	11	27	24	+3	47	
7	Maiak Rokyta	24	9	4	11	29	29	0	46	
8	Vorskla Opishne (Note: Match against Kolos was awarded as a technical win, as Kolos fielded ineligible player.)	24	7	2	15	29	28	+1	40	
9	Myrhorod (Note: Did not show for 3 matches)	21	6	4	11	20	32	−12	37	
10	Temp Hradyzk (Note: Match against Psel was awarded as a technical win, as Psel fielded ineligible player.)	24	4	4	16	19	70	−51	36	
11	Adoms Kremenchuk	12	11	1	0	32	1	+31	35	
12	Kremin-2 Kremenchuk (Note: Did not show for 7 matches) (W)	17	7	4	6	22	17	+5	35	Withdrawn
13	Kolos Kobeliaky (Note: Did not show for 2 matches. Match against Locomotyv was awarded as a technical win, as Locomotyv fielded ineligible player.)	22	4	4	14	16	44	−28	34	
14	Budivelnyk Shyshaky (Note: Did not show for 4 matches) (W)	8	0	0	8	2	40	−38	8	Withdrawn

Source: fcvorskla.com.ua
(C) Champions; (W) Withdrawn

== Goalscorers ==
Top goalscorer was Vladyslav Nemeshkalo with sixteen goals. Oleksandr Solnyshin from Adoms came in second having only played in second half of the competition.

Rank	Scorer	Team	Goals
1	(Ukraine) Vladyslav Nemeshkalo	Psel Hadiach	16
2	(Ukraine) Oleksandr Solnyshin	Adoms Kremenchuk	14
3	(Ukraine) Ihor Kyiko	Psel Hadiach	10
3	(Ukraine) Anatolii Siryk	Sula Lubny	10

== Sources ==
- Lomov, Anatolii; Stadnychenko, Oleksandr (2009), 100 Років Полтавському Футболу [100 Years of Poltava Football] (in Ukrainian), Poltava: Poltava, ISBN 978-966-97035-0-7
- Lomov, Anatolii; Kryvorotko, Serhii (2010), Энциклопедия Полтавского Футбола (1909-2010) [Encyclopedia of Poltava Football (1909-2010)] (in Russian), Poltava: OOO "ASMI", ISBN 978-966-182-118-6
