= 1995–96 Ukrainian Football Amateur League =

Ukrainian Football Amateur League
- Season: 1995–96
- Champions: None (6 group winners): Pokuttia Kolomyia (Group 1); Zoria Khorostkiv (Group 2); Papirnyk Malyn (Group 3); Fakel Varva (Group 4); Avanhard Kramatorsk (Group 5); Portovyk Kerch (Group 6)

1995–96 Amateur championship of Ukraine was the fourth amateur championship of Ukraine and the 32nd since the establishment of championship among fitness clubs (KFK) in 1964. The format of competitions was preserved as in the Soviet competitions where there was six independent groups split by regional principal. Compare to the last season competitions, number of participating teams were cut about trifold from 91 to 26.

== Teams ==
=== Location map ===
Locations of team home grounds in the 1994-95 Ukrainian Championship among amateur teams

== Group 1 ==
Pos	Team	Pld	W	D	L	GF	GA	GD	Pts	Promotion
1	Pokuttia Kolomyya (C)	6	3	3	0	9	5	+4	12	Promoted
2	Meblevyk Chernivtsi	6	2	3	1	7	7	0	9	
3	Karpaty Rakhiv	6	1	5	0	8	8	0	8	
4	Yavir Yavoriv	6	0	1	5	0	4	−4	1	withdrew

(C) Champions

== Group 2 ==
Pos	Team	Pld	W	D	L	GF	GA	GD	Pts	Promotion
1	Zoria Khorostkiv (C)	4	3	0	1	15	4	+11	9	
2	ENKO Lutsk	4	3	0	1	11	7	+4	9	
3	Sokil Radyvyliv	4	0	0	4	2	17	−15	0	
4	Svitanok Vinnytsia	0	0	0	0	0	0	0	0	withdrew
5	Tekstylnyk Dunayivtsi	0	0	0	0	0	0	0	0	withdrew

(C) Champions

Notes:

- Games ENKO-Svitanok 1:2 and Svitanok-Zoria 1:1 were annulled.

== Group 3 ==
Pos	Team	Pld	W	D	L	GF	GA	GD	Pts	Promotion
1	Papirnyk Malyn (C)	6	3	3	0	8	2	+6	12	Promoted
2	Lokomotyv Smila	6	3	2	1	5	5	0	11	Promoted
3	Budivelnyk Brovary	6	1	4	1	5	1	+4	7	
4	CSKA-2 Kyiv	6	0	1	5	1	11	−10	1	withdrew

(C) Champions

== Group 4 ==
Pos	Team	Pld	W	D	L	GF	GA	GD	Pts	Promotion
1	Fakel Varva (C)	6	5	0	1	15	4	+11	15	Promoted
2	Elektron Romny	6	3	0	3	8	8	0	9	
3	Avanhard Merefa	6	2	1	3	3	9	−6	7	Promoted
4	Lokomotyv Hrebinka	6	1	1	4	8	13	−5	4	

(C) Champions

== Group 5 ==
Pos	Team	Pld	W	D	L	GF	GA	GD	Pts	Promotion
1	Avanhard Kramatorsk (C)	4	2	2	0	8	2	+6	8	
2	Shakhtar Rovenky	4	2	1	1	7	5	+2	7	
3	Budivelnyk Kryvyi Rih	4	0	1	3	2	10	−8	1	
4	Enerhiya Berdiansk	0	0	0	0	0	0	0	0	withdrew

(C) Champions

== Group 6 ==
Pos	Team	Pld	W	D	L	GF	GA	GD	Pts	Promotion
1	Portovyk Kerch (C)	6	5	0	1	6	3	+3	15	Promoted
2	Kolos Osokorivka	6	4	0	2	11	6	+5	12	
3	Blaho Blahoyeve	6	2	0	4	4	7	−3	6	
4	Lokomotyv Znamianka	6	1	0	5	1	6	−5	3	
5	Pervomaisk	0	0	0	0	0	0	0	0	withdrew

(C) Champions

== Number of teams by region ==
Number	Region	Team(s)
1	Autonomous Republic of Crimea	Portovyk Kerch
1	Cherkasy Oblast	Lokomotyv Smila
1	Chernihiv Oblast	Fakel Varva
1	Chernivtsi Oblast	Meblevyk Chernivtsi
1	Dnipropetrovsk Oblast	Budivelnyk Kryvyi Rih
1	Donetsk Oblast	Avanhard Kramatorsk
1	Ivano-Frankivsk Oblast	Pokuttia Kolomyia
1	Kharkiv Oblast	Avanhard Merefa
1	Kherson Oblast	Kolos Osokorivka
1	Khmelnytskyi Oblast	Tekstylnyk Dunaivtsi
1	Kirovohrad Oblast	Lokomotyv Znamianka
1	Kyiv	CSKA-2
1	Kyiv Oblast	Budivelnyk Brovary
1	Luhansk Oblast	Shakhtar Rovenky
1	Lviv Oblast	Yavir Yavoriv
1	Mykolaiv Oblast	SC Pervomaisk
1	Odesa Oblast	Blaho Blahoyeve
1	Poltava Oblast	Lokomotyv Hrebinka
1	Rivne Oblast	Sokil Radyvyliv
1	Sumy Oblast	Elektron Romny
1	Ternopil Oblast	Zorya Khorostkiv
1	Vinnytsia Oblast	Svitanok Vinnytsia
1	Volyn Oblast	ENKO Lutsk
1	Zakarpattia Oblast	Karpaty Rakhiv
1	Zaporizhia Oblast	Enerhia Berdiansk
1	Zhytomyr Oblast	Papirnyk Malyn
