= Anatoliy Shakun =

Soviet footballer and coach

Personal information
- Date of birth: 2 January 1948
- Place of birth: Constanța, Romania
- Date of death: 27 February 2020 (aged 72)
- Height: 1.74 m (5 ft 8 1/2 in)
- Position: Midfielder

Senior career*
Years	Team	Apps	(Gls)
1965–1971	Zorya Voroshilovgrad	101	(18)
1972	SK Chernihiv	28	(10)
1973	Shakhtar Kadiyivka	18	(2)
1973–1975	Zorya Voroshilovgrad	18	(1)

Managerial career
- 1978–1979: Zorya Voroshilovgrad (assistant)
- 1981: Zorya Voroshilovgrad (assistant)
- 1990–1993: Zorya-MALS Luhansk (assistant)
- 1993–1994: Zorya-MALS Luhansk
- 1994–1995: Dynamo Luhansk (assistant)
- 1997–1998: Avanhard Rovenky
- 2001: Shakhtar Luhansk
- * Club domestic league appearances and goals

Anatoliy Shakun (Ukrainian: Анатолій Дмитрович Шакун; 2 January 1948 – 27 February 2020) was a Soviet football midfielder and coach.
