= FC Arsenal Kharkiv =

- Full name: FC Arsenal Kharkiv
- Founded: 1998 (Note: The club refers to its date of origin to the initial date of 1998 when Arsenal Kharkiv began participating. The club was renamed to FC Kharkiv (2005) when they were promoted to the Ukrainian Premier League in 2005. Arsenal continued to exist but formed a new club around where the ground and sports structure already existed.)
- Ground: Arsenal-Spartak, Kharkiv
- Capacity: 2,300
- Chairman: Volodymyr Chumak
- Manager: Vladislav Kisel
- League: Druha Liha B
- 2008–2009: 12th (withdrew)

FC Arsenal Kharkiv is a football club based in Kharkiv, Ukraine. Arsenal Kharkiv currently plays in the Kharkiv city competitions. In 2005, based on the club, another club FC Kharkiv (2005) was formed. FC Arsenal has a well-established infrastructure with a series of stadiums and sports schools.

Arsenal Kharkiv withdrew from the Professional Football League of Ukraine after the 2008–09 season, while its youth teams continue to compete in national youth competitions.

== Overview ==
The club was formed on 30 January 1998 at the Kharkiv Aviation Institute sports court. Its initial home stadium was "Spartak" and the first head coach – Valentyn Kryachko. The club's first game at the professional level took place on 2 August 1999 in Kremenchuk against the local FC Kremin Kremenchuk, which Arsenal won 1:0. The club's first goal was scored by Viktor Hryhorov.

In 2005, the club was reorganized after a successful season in the 2004–05 Ukrainian First League. After obtaining promotion to the Ukrainian Top League, the club yielded the opportunity to a newly established club FC Kharkiv which was led by the former coach of Arsenal Hennadiy Lytovchenko. Several Arsenal's leading footballers also joined the new club.

In 2005, FC Arsenal Kharkiv started again from the Ukrainian Second League.

== Stadiums ==
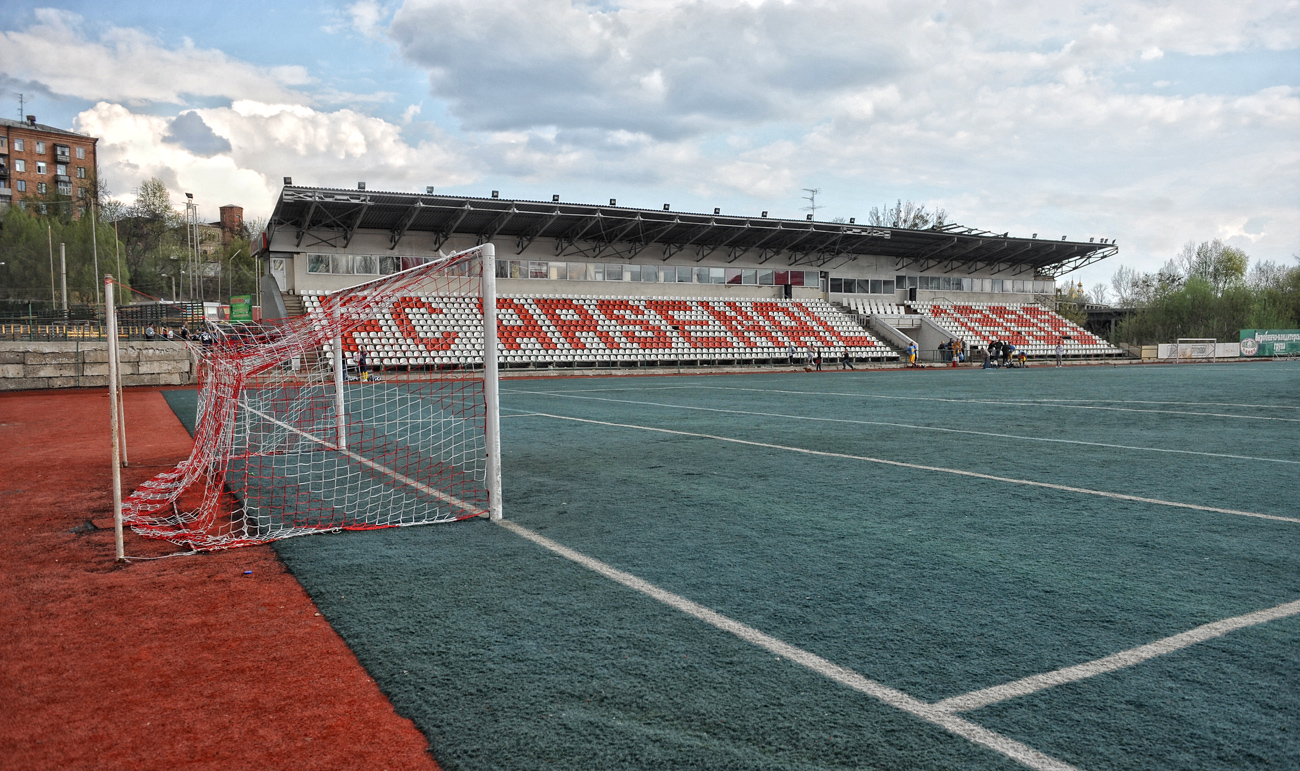
Arsenal-Spartak Stadium (stand view)

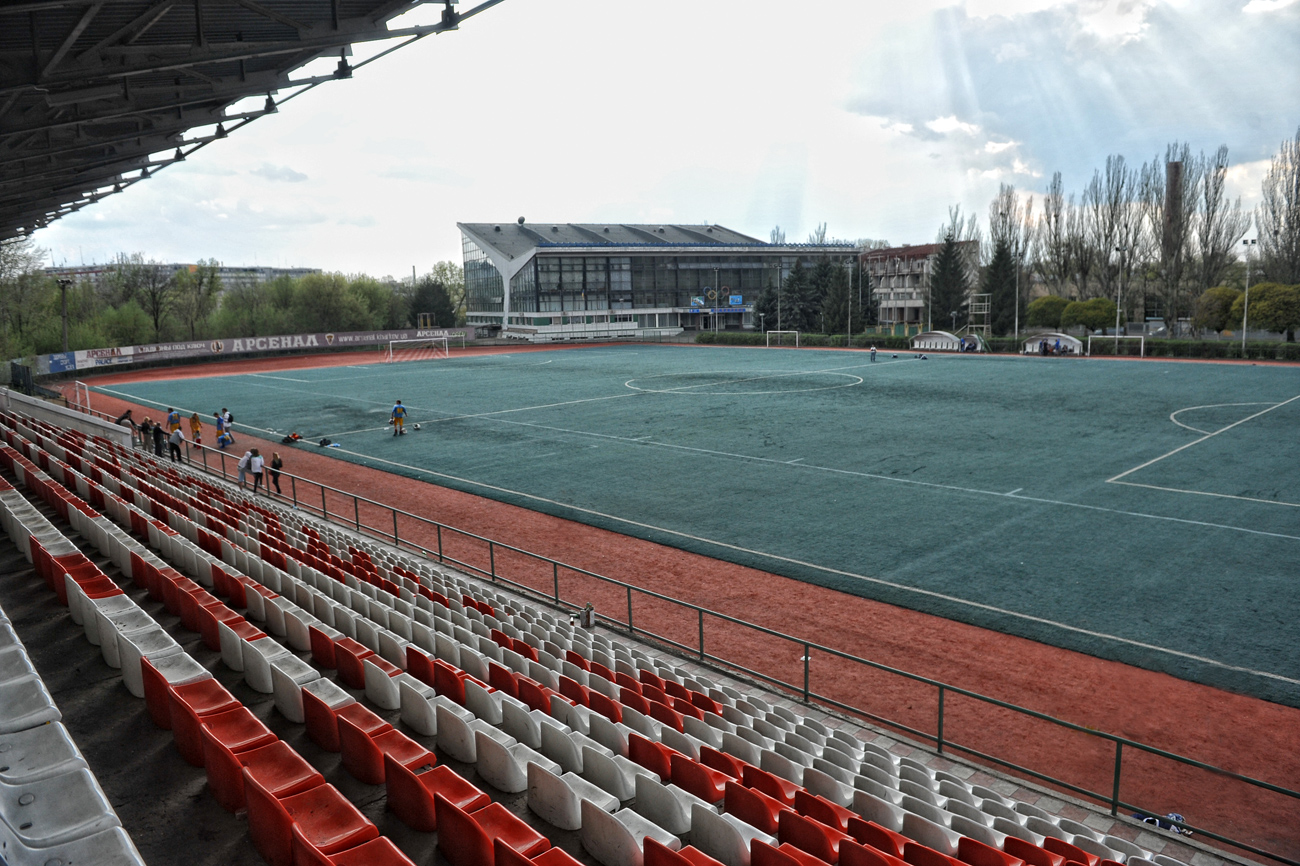
Arsenal-Spartak Stadium (field view)

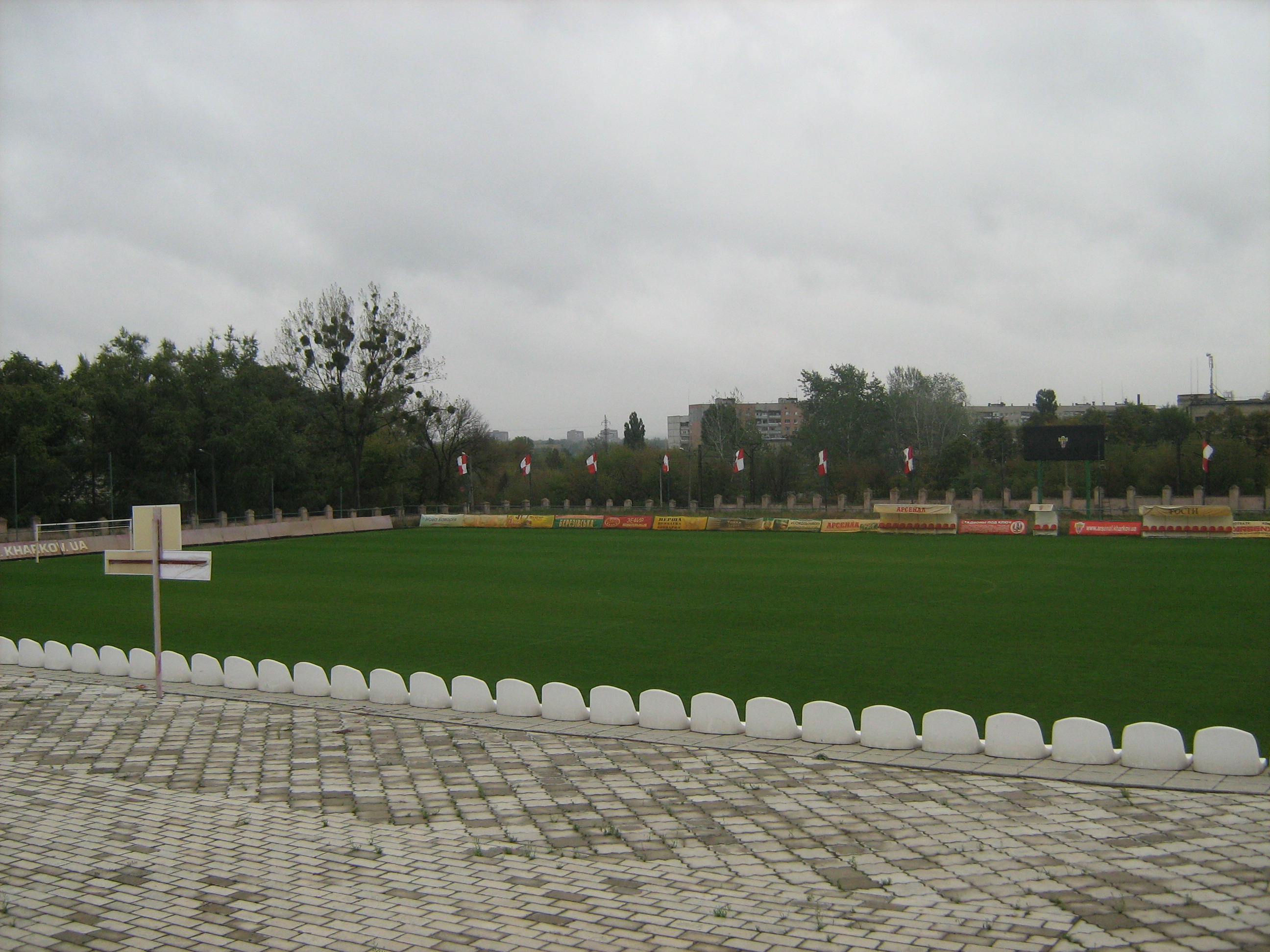
former Arsenal-Bavaria, now Helios Arena

The club has a possession of two stadiums Arsenal-Spartak Stadium (former Spartak) and Arsenal-Bavaria Stadium (former stadium of local rope factory). Also the club has a complex of four fields with a synthetic surface called Arsenal-OPEN. Arsenal-Spartak has capacity of 1500 people, but it's planned to enlarge it to 8000 by 2010; Arsenal-Bavaria has a capacity to accommodate 2300 spectators. In July 2010 Arsenal-Bavaria was given away to FC Helios Kharkiv and was renamed into Helios Arena.

== Coaches ==
=== Original club ===
- 1998–2001 Valentyn Kryachko
- 2001–2002 Ivan Panchyshyn
- 2002–2005 Ihor Rakhayev
- 2005 Hennadiy Lytovchenko

=== After reorganization ===
- 2005 Ihor Rakhayev
- 2005–2007 Viktor Kamarzayev
- 2007 Serhiy Kandaurov
- 2007–2008 Adel bin Ahmed Sassi
- 2008 Serhiy Kandaurov
- 2008–2009 Vladyslav Kysel
- 2009 Mykola Trubachov

== Notable players ==
- Anderson Ribeiro, first foreign footballer, first Brazilian footballer in Kharkiv
- Serhiy Rybalka, Ukrainian international player
- Gegham Kadymyan, Armenian international player who started out in Arsenal
- Oleksandr Kucher, Ukrainian international player, participant of the UEFA Euro 2012

== League and cup history ==
=== Arsenal Kharkiv (1999–2005) ===
Season	Div.	Pos.	Pl.	W	D	L	GS	GA	P	Domestic Cup	Europe	Notes
1998–99	4th	1	18	15	1	2	19	6	46	Amateur Cup		
1998–99	4th	4	3	0	1	2	0	5	1	Amateur Cup		
1999–00	3rd "C"	4	26	15	4	7	24	13	49	1/4 Finals 2nd League Cup		
2000–01	3rd "C"	4	30	15	7	8	55	27	52	1/4 Finals 2nd League Cup		
2001–02	3rd "C"	2	34	22	6	6	52	23	72	2nd round		Promoted
2002–03	2nd	9	34	13	7	14	38	42	46	1/8 finals		
2003–04	2nd	7	34	15	7	12	41	40	52	1/32 finals		
2004–05	2nd	2	34	23	4	7	47	24	73	1/32 finals		Promoted (Note: Club is promoted to the Ukrainian Premier League and its rights are bought out by businessmen from the city of Kharkiv. The team is renamed to FC Kharkiv.)
2005–06	refer to FC Kharkiv											

=== Arsenal Kharkiv (2005–2009) ===
Season	Div.	Pos.	Pl.	W	D	L	GS	GA	P	Domestic Cup	Europe	Notes
2005–06	3rd "B"	10	24	9	3	12	35	44	30	1/64 finals		(Note: The club reforms with the original name and enters the Druha Liha B)
2006–07	3rd "B"	9	28	10	4	14	35	42	35	1/32 finals		
2007–08	3rd "B"	3	34	21	8	5	62	20	71	1/32 finals		
2008–09	3rd "B"	12	34	11	10	13	36	47	40	1/64 finals		–3 (Note: Deducted three (3) points for non-paying the participation fees. The decision was officially declared by the Disciplinary Committee of PFL on 28 May 2009.) – Withdraw
2009–11	participation in regional competitions of Kharkiv Oblast as Arsenal-Politekhnik											
2012	4th	3	6	2	0	4	5	12	6			

== See also ==
- WFC Arsenal Kharkiv
