= FC Fakel Varva =

Druzhba-Nova Varva
- Full name: Druzhba-Nova Varva
- Founded: 1963 (as Fakel Varva)
- Ground: Yunist Stadium
- Capacity: 5,000
- League: Currently – Amateurs (Chernihiv Oblast First League)

FC Fakel Varva is an amateur Ukrainian football team based in Varva, Chernihiv Oblast. The club competes in the Chernihiv oblast competition as Druzhba-Nova Varva. The club was sponsored by the Hnidytsi Gas Refining Factory located in a village of Hnidytsi, Pryluky Raion. The factory is part of the Ukrnafta state corporation.

== History ==
The club was formed in 1963 as Fakel Varva.

The team spent a short stint in the Ukrainian Second Division. After several successful seasons, the team's administration decided to withdraw from the professional league and return to the Chernihiv oblast competitions.

The club is also well known as a competitive amateur club. The club has won the Amateur Cup and the Championship the next season.

The club plays its home games in the Yunist Stadium in Varva.

== Name ==
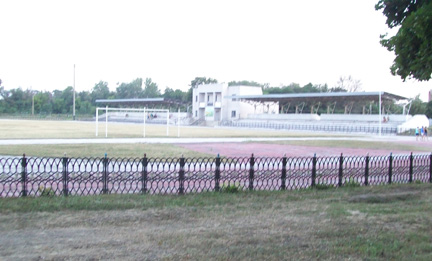
Yunist Stadium, Varva

- 1963–1969 – Fakel Varva
- 1970–1993 – Naftovyk Varva
- 1994–1996 – Fakel Varva
- 1997–2000 – Fakel-NFZ Varva
- 2001–2004 – Fakel Varva
- 2005 onwards – Druzhba-Nova Varva

== Honours ==
Ukrainian Amateur Football Championship

- Winners (2): 1995–96, 2000

Ukrainian Amateur Cup

- Winners (1): 1998–99

Chernihiv Oblast Football Championship

- Winners (5): 1994, 1995, 1999, 2001, 2002

Chernihiv Oblast Football Cup

- Winners (1): 1995

== League and cup history ==
| Season | Div. | Pos. | Pl. | W | D | L | GS | GA | P | Domestic Cup | Europe | Notes |
|---|---|---|---|---|---|---|---|---|---|---|---|---|
| 1992–93 | 4th | 10 | 26 | 10 | 3 | 13 | 23 | 36 | 23 | | | withdrew |
| 1995–96 | 4th | 1 | 6 | 5 | 0 | 1 | 15 | 4 | 15 | | | promoted |
| 1996–97 | 3rd "A" | 2 | 30 | 18 | 7 | 5 | 40 | 20 | 61 | 1/64 finals | | |
| 1997–98 | 3rd "A" | 2 | 30 | 18 | 6 | 6 | 48 | 23 | 60 | 1/64 finals | | withdrew |
| 1998–99 | 4th | 1 | 14 | 12 | 2 | 0 | 36 | 7 | 38 | Winner | | qualified to finals |
| 1998–99 | 4th | 2 | 3 | 2 | 0 | 1 | 4 | 2 | 6 | Winner | | won 3rd place game |
| 1999 | 4th | 1 | 10 | 7 | 1 | 2 | 16 | 6 | 22 | 1/2 finals | | qualified to finals |
| 1999 | 4th | 3 | 2 | 0 | 0 | 2 | 0 | 5 | 0 | 1/2 finals | | |
| 2000 | 4th | 1 | 6 | 4 | 2 | 0 | 15 | 2 | 14 | 1/2 finals | | qualified to 2nd stage |
| 2000 | 4th | 1 | 6 | 4 | 1 | 1 | 10 | 6 | 13 | 1/2 finals | | qualified to finals |
| 2000 | 4th | 1 | 3 | 2 | 1 | 0 | 7 | 3 | 7 | 1/2 finals | | won 1st place game |
| 2001 | 4th | 1 | 8 | 6 | 1 | 1 | 20 | 6 | 19 | | | qualified to 2nd stage |
| 2001 | 4th | 3 | 10 | 5 | 2 | 3 | 12 | 11 | 17 | | | missed finals |
| 2002 | 4th | 1 | 8 | 4 | 3 | 1 | 13 | 8 | 15 | | | qualified to 2nd stage |
| 2002 | 4th | 3 | 6 | 2 | 0 | 4 | 7 | 12 | 6 | | | qualified to 3rd stage |
| 2002 | 4th | 2 | 3 | 2 | 0 | 1 | 8 | 4 | 6 | | | qualified to finals |
| 2002 | 4th | 2 | 2 | 1 | 1 | 0 | 3 | 1 | 4 | | | |
| 2003 | 4th | 1 | 10 | 8 | 1 | 1 | 28 | 8 | 25 | | | qualified to 2nd stage |
| 2003 | 4th | 2 | 8 | 4 | 2 | 2 | 15 | 9 | 14 | | | withdrew |

== Notable players ==
- Oleh Volotyok
- Yuriy Hetman

== See also ==
- FC Naftovyk-Ukrnafta Okhtyrka
