= Serhiy Levchenko =

Ukrainian footballer

Personal information
- Full name: Serhiy Mykolayovych Levchenko
- Date of birth: 3 January 1981
- Place of birth: Kyiv, Ukrainian SSR, Soviet Union
- Date of death: 16 June 2007 (aged 26)
- Place of death: Kyiv, Ukraine
- Height: 1.77 m (5 ft 10 in)
- Position: Forward

Youth career
- Sports School Zmina Kyiv
- 1996–1999: Borussia Mönchengladbach

Senior career*
Years	Team	Apps	(Gls)
1999–2001	Borussia Mönchengladbach II	16	(4)
2002–2004	Nafkom-Akademia Irpin	72	(49)
2004–2005	Metalurh Zaporizhia	4	(0)
2006	Spartak Sumy	10	(0)
2007	Nafkom Brovary	10	(8)

International career
2003	Ukraine U-21	1	(0)
- * Club domestic league appearances and goals

Serhiy Levchenko (Ukrainian: Сергій Миколайович Левченко; 3 January 1981 – 16 June 2007) was a professional Ukrainian football forward.

== Career ==
In 2001 FC Nafkom-Akademia Irpin paid 100,000 DM to Borussia Mönchengladbach for Levchenko.

On 10 February 2003 he played one game against Egyptian youth team.

On 16 June 2007 Levchenko got killed in a car accident. On the Paton Bridge he was driving at high speeds on his Lexus and after losing control over it, Levchenko ran onto an oncoming traffic and hit a truck. He was survived by his wife and daughter.
