= FC Shakhtar Luhansk =

- Full name: FC Shakhtar Luhansk
- Founded: 1977
- Dissolved: 2003
- Ground: Shakhtar Stadium, Yuvileine
- Capacity: 3,000
- Chairman: Oleh Kotevych
- Manager: Yuriy Pohrebnyak
- League: defunct

Shakhtar Luhansk was a Ukrainian football club from the city of Luhansk.

== History ==
The football team was formed in 1977 when there was opened a new mine Luhanska No.1. At the team's beginning stood former players of FC Zorya Luhansk Volodymyr Abramov and Anatoliy Shulzhenko. The team competed in the Luhansk city championship hosting its games in a field next to the local Agricultural Institute.

In the early 1990s the team moved to the newly built stadium in the Luhansk's suburb Yuvileine. In 1993 out of Vahonobudivnyk Stakhanov was invited former Zorya goalkeeper Oleksandr Tkachenko who appointed the club's head coach (manager). Tkachenko became the first actual head coach of the club and the club fielded its senior team in oblast competitions.

As the club improved the club began taking part in the Ukrainian Amateur Competitions starting in 1999. In 2000 when the club was headed by Yuriy Pohrebnyak it brought along several better players and de facto uniting another local team Ellada-Enerhiya and Shakhtar. In 2001 the club won the Ukrainian Football Amateur League championship which earned them the right to enter the Professional leagues.

In the next season Shakhtar Luhansk entered the Druha Liha Group C and had a successful initial season finishing second. Unfortunately, prior to the start of the next season the club's administration withdrew the club from the PFL and the club subsequently dissolved.

== Honors ==
- Ukrainian Druha Liha:

Runners Up: 1

2002/03 Group C

- Ukrainian Football Amateur Association: 1

2001 Champions

== League and cup history ==
Season	Div.	Pos.	Pl.	W	D	L	GS	GA	P	Domestic Cup	Europe	Notes
2002–03	3rd "C"	2	28	25	5	3	49	15	65	1/32 finals		
2003–04	Prior to the start of season the club folds											

== Managers ==
- 1993 – 1998 Oleksandr Tkachenko
- 1998 – 1999 Yuriy Kolesnikov
- 2000 – 2000 Viktor Kuznetsov
- 2001 – 2001 Anatoliy Shakun
- 2001 – 2002 Yuriy Pohrebnyak
- 2002 – 2002 Vladimir Kuzovlyov
- 2002 – 2003 Yuriy Pohrebnyak
