= FC Shakhta Ukraina Ukrainsk =

FC Shakhta Ukraina Ukrainsk was a football team based in a small city of Ukrainsk, Ukraine.

== History ==
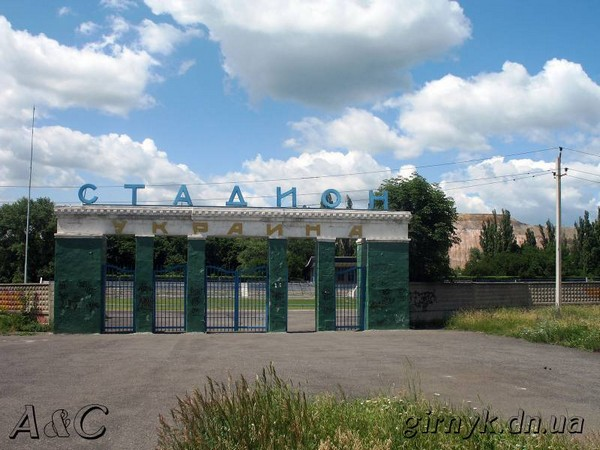
A local stadium where club hosted home games

The football team appeared in the 1990s and represented the Ukraine coal mine in Ukrainsk.

Led by Viktor Hrachov, the team has won the Ukrainian Amateur Cup and some four of its players, along with its manager, were called to form the Ukrainian amateur national team to make a debut at the 2001 UEFA Regions' Cup.

== Honors ==
Ukrainian Amateur Cup

- Holder (1): 1999,

Donetsk Oblast football championship

- Winners (1): 1998

== Coaches ==
- 1999–2000 Viktor Hrachov

== Notable players ==
- Vasyl Sachko
