= FC Dynamo Lviv =

Ukrainian football club

FC Dynamo Lviv is an amateur Ukrainian football club from Lviv, Lviv Oblast.

Created in 1940, the club for most of its history stayed amateur. In 1946 its best players joined FC Spartak Lviv. The club reached the semifinals in the 1998–99 Ukrainian Amateur Cup. In 1999-2002 the club played at the professional level in the Ukrainian Second League.

== Notable players ==
- Kazimierz Gorski

== League and cup history ==
Season	Div.	Pos.	Pl.	W	D	L	GS	GA	P	Domestic Cup	Europe	Notes
