= FC Systema-KKhP Cherniakhiv =

Ukrainian football club

FC Systema-KKhP Cherniakhiv was a Ukrainian football club from Cherniakhiv, Zhytomyr Oblast.

== League and cup history ==
Season	Div.	Pos.	Pl.	W	D	L	GS	GA	P	Domestic Cup	Europe	Notes
2002–03	2nd	12	28	7	6	15	24	34		2nd Round	N/A	Withdrew
