= Football Cup of the Ukrainian SSR =

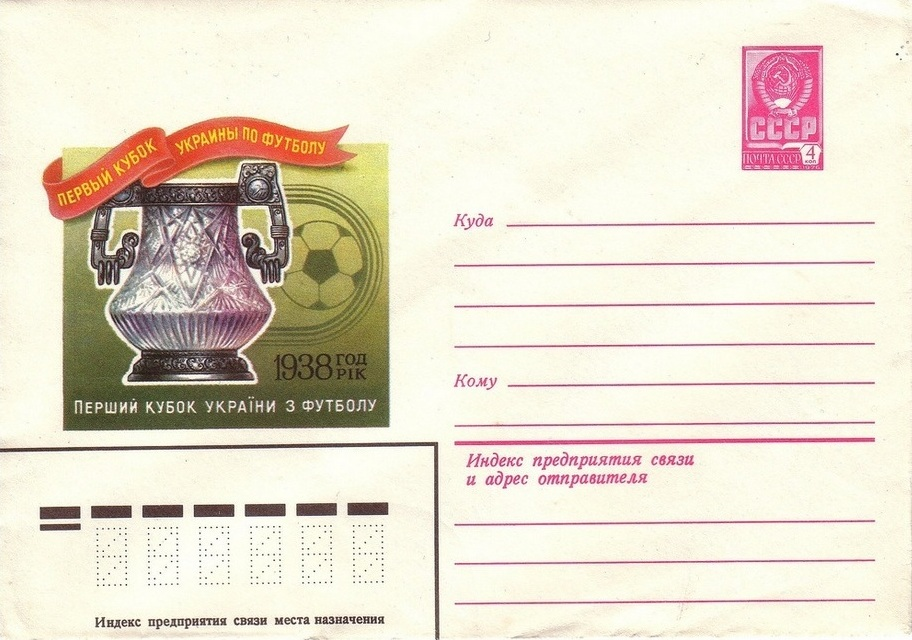
- An envelope picture with the first Ukrainian SSR Cup
- Organiser(s): Football Federation of the Ukrainian SSR
- Founded: 1936; 90 years ago (rebranded in 1938)
- Abolished: 1992 (reformed into the Ukrainian Football Cup)
- Region: Ukrainian SSR (Soviet Union)
- Teams: 26 (1991)
- Qualifier for: Soviet Cup
- Related competitions: Football Championship of the Ukrainian SSR
- Last champions: Prohres Berdychiv (1st title)
- Most championships: Dynamo Kyiv (7 titles)

Football Cup of the Ukrainian SSR (Ukrainian: Кубок УРСР з футболу, romanized: Kubok URSR z futbolu, Russian: Кубок УССР по футболу, romanized: Kubok USSR po futbolu) was a playoff republican competitions in association football that were taken place in Ukrainian SSR in 1936–1991 and were predecessors of the Ukrainian Cup. The competition was originally called a Football championship of UkrSSR for exhibition teams of sports societies in 1936 and 1937. The first cup trophy was awarded in 1937, and starting in 1938, the competition was renamed the Football Cup of the Ukrainian SSR as it was commemorated on the Soviet envelope.

== History ==
Participation was open to everyone, whether a team from the Soviet Top League or from an educational institution, as long as none of the players competed in the Soviet Cup simultaneously. Early seasons of the cup tournament were called a spring contest, which allowed them to be considered a championship title competition rather than a cup competition. However, older Ministry of Youth and Sports documents show that the spring contest competitions were indeed considered a football cup competition.

In 1938, the Ukrainian Cup qualification stage was included in the 1938 Soviet Cup qualification for the first time, while both later stages of the 1938 tournaments were conducted in parallel to each other. It was also the first time the Ukrainian Spring Contest was referred to as the Ukrainian Cup. Following that season, participation of the better Ukrainian teams in the Ukrainian Cup was disrupted, and the 1939 season of the Ukrainian Cup did not include teams of masters that competed only in the Soviet Cup. The 1940 season had a similar organization to the previous 1939, but the 1940 Soviet Cup failed to take place due to scheduling issues, and no Ukrainian teams of masters participated in any cup competition that season. The competition was interrupted in 1941–1943 due to World War II.

In 1944, the Ukrainian Cup was renewed and played after the 1944 Soviet Cup. It also included all three better Ukrainian teams (Kyiv, Kharkiv, Stalino) that competed in the Soviet Cup. In 1945, both the 1945 Ukrainian Cup and the 1945 Soviet Cup included better Ukrainian teams such as Dynamo Kyiv, Shakhtar Donetsk (Stakhanovets Stalino at that time), and others. Both tournaments were conducted in the same timeframe during the autumn of 1945. The 1946 Soviet Cup was shortened, and only two (2) teams from Ukraine competed in it (Dynamo Kyiv and Spartak Uzhhorod), while the 1946 Ukrainian Cup was conducted in full. In 1947, the 1947 Soviet Cup was conducted in the summer and included only teams from Pervaya Grouppa and Vtoraya Grouppa, involving all Ukrainian teams of those "Grouppas", while the 1947 Ukrainian Cup was conducted in the fall and also included all Ukrainian teams of those "Grouppas" as well as other teams. The 1948 Soviet Cup was once again shortened and only two (2) Ukrainian teams (Dynamo Kyiv and Lokomotyv Kharkiv) competed in it, while the 1948 Ukrainian Cup involved participation of most of the Ukrainian teams.

In 1949, there was a big reform of the Soviet Cup, all participants of the Soviet Pervaya and Vtoraya "Grouppas" were excused from participation in their republican cup tournaments and had to competed only in the Soviet Cup, while winners of the republican cup tournaments were awarded a guaranteed place in the 1949 Soviet Cup. It revived the tournament organization of the 1939 Soviet Cup. Since then, the Ukrainian Cup was completely degraded as a regional-level qualification stage of the Soviet Cup.

In 1957, all republican level cup competitions were removed from qualification for the Soviet Cup, and winners (later better teams) of them qualified for the Soviet Amateur Cup, while the Soviet Cup was made exclusive predominantly for the league teams. Since then, the Ukrainian Cup was officially regarded as the competition of the collective of physical culture (KFK), a Soviet term for amateur sports.

In 1972, for the next five seasons, there was established Ukrainian Cup for the Ukrainian teams of the Pervaya and Vtoraya leagues as the award of the "Radianska Ukrayina" newspaper. It was revived once more in 1990. The last winner FC Temp Shepetivka of the Soviet Ukrainian Cup among the Second League teams was allowed to join the Ukrainian Premier League in 1991.

Following the dissolution of the Soviet Union, the Ukrainian Cup was re-established as a normal competition which involves participation of all professional football clubs. Later in 1996, the Football Federation of Ukraine reorganized the Ukrainian Cup by introducing the Ukrainian Amateur Cup and limiting participation of the non-League clubs in the national cup competition.

During the World War II, the crystal trophy, cup of the Ukrainian SSR, was not evacuated and was stolen by one of employees of the All-Ukrainian Council of Physical Culture. During the Nazi occupation of Kiev, the trophy appeared in a store of random things at Velyka Vasylkivska street and was spotted by Kiev footballers who stayed behind and played for a local team Rukh Kyiv. The athletes informed the municipal department of education and culture which in turn on 19 May 1942 wrote a letter to the administration of the antique store with a request to return them the Cup and inform the name of individual who pawned it in the store. It is unknown if the person who stole the trophy was ever found, but the Cup was returned. In this way, the athletes who were later labeled as "traitors" by the Soviet regime saved the trophy for Ukrainian football of the post-war period.

== List of finals ==
=== Springtime Contest ===
The competition was known as the Springtime Contest. It was conducted in spring, unlike the regular round-robin championship, was taking place in the fall.

Year	Venue	Winner	Score	Runner-up
1936; Final	24 June 1936 18:00 (MST); Kiev – Balytskyi Stadium; Attendance: 35,000	Dynamo Kyiv; Viktor Shylovsky 7', 23', 53'; Konstantin Shchegotsky 56'; Mykola Korotkykh (?)	6 – 0 (2 – 0)	Dynamo Odessa; Volodymyr Tokar (?)
1937; Final	18 May 1937 18:00 (MST); Kiev – Balytskyi Stadium; Attendance: 25,000	Dynamo Kyiv; Oleksiy Klymenko 35' (own); Makar Honcharenko 53'; Viktor Shylovsky 68'; Mykola Makhynia 94', 103'	4 – 2 (0 – 1)	Dynamo Odessa; Leonid Oriekhov 65' (pen.)

=== Ukrainian Cup ===
The competition was integrated into the Soviet Cup. In 1938, both competitions ran in parallel; the 1938 season was partially used as the preliminary stage. Ten teams that qualified from 5 regional zones joined with 6 teams of masters. These 16 teams qualified for both the Soviet Cup and the Football Cup of Ukraine, which ran separately. In 1939 and 1940, only the winner of the Ukrainian Cup would qualify for the Soviet Cup. Following World War II, the Ukrainian Cup was once again conducted as a separate competition among all teams, including the "teams of masters". Starting from 1949, the competition was finally integrated into the Soviet Cup as its preliminary stage for good.

Year	Venue	Winner	Score	Runner-up
1938; Final	15 October 1938 16:00 (MST); Kiev – Yezhov Stadium; Attendance: 15,000	Dynamo Kyiv; Petro Laiko 27', 76'; Viktor Shylovsky 84'	3 – 1 (1 – 0)	Lokomotyv Kyiv; Oleksandr Shatskyi 73'
1944; Final	Kiev	Dynamo Kyiv won the Final Group		
1945; Final	8 November 1945 ?:? (MST); Kiev – Dynamo Stadium; Attendance: ?	Lokomotyv Kharkiv; Anatoliy Horokhov (?)	1 – 0 (0 – 0)	Dynamo Kyiv
1946; Final	12 November 1946 14:30 (MST); Kiev – Dynamo Stadium; Attendance: 20,000	Dynamo Kyiv; Pavlo Vinkovatyi 42', 45'	2 – 0 (2 – 0)	Lokomotyv Kharkiv
1947; Final	9 November 1947 14:00 (MST); Kiev – Dynamo Stadium; Attendance: 12,000	Dynamo Kyiv; Mykhailo Chaplyhin 7', 10'; Fedir Dashkov 20'; Pavlo Vinkovatyi 47'; Pyotr Dementiev 49'	5 – 1 (3 – 1)	Kharchovyk Odesa; Mykola Potapov 34'
1948; Final	26 October 1948 15:00 (MST); Kiev – Dynamo Stadium; Attendance: 7,000	Dynamo Kyiv; Viktor Zhylin 16', 44'; Heorhiy Ponomariov 46'; Pavlo Vinkovatyi 78'	4 – 1 (2 – 0)	Bilshovyk Mukacheve; József Egervári 83' (pen.)

=== Ukrainian Cup (Soviet Cup qualification) ===
Year	Winner		Runner-up		Score	Soviet Cup
1939	Avanhard Kramatorsk	(Donetsk Oblast)	(Odesa Oblast)	Kharchovyk Odessa	2 – 0	Avanhard Kramatorsk
1940	Dynamo Dnipropetrovsk	(Dnipropetrovsk Oblast)	(Odesa Oblast)	Lokomotyv Odessa	2 – 2 (6 – 2 replay)	Dynamo Dnipropetrovsk; Zenit Kharkiv (see Soviet Amateur Cup)
1949	VPS Kharkiv	(Kharkiv Oblast)	(Odesa Oblast)	Vodnyk Odessa	5 – 1	Zenit Kharkiv (as Kharkiv city team)
1950	Spartak Uzhhorod	(Zakarpattia Oblast)	(Zaporizhzhia Oblast)	Metalurh Zaporizhia	4 – 2	Spartak Uzhhorod; Metalurh Zaporizhia
1951	Metalurh Zaporizhia	(Zaporizhzhia Oblast)	(Lviv Oblast)	BO Lviv	4 – 0	Metalurh Zaporizhia
1952	Metalurh Zaporizhia	(Zaporizhzhia Oblast)	(Lviv Oblast)	BO Lviv	6 – 3	Metalurh Zaporizhia
1953	Torpedo Kirovohrad	(Kirovohrad Oblast)	(Poltava Oblast)	Lokomotyv Poltava	3 – 1	Torpedo Kirovohrad
1954	Mashbud Kyiv	(Kyiv)	(Kyiv)	OBO Kyiv	1 – 0, 3 – 1	Mashynobudivnyk Kyiv
1955	Mashbud Kyiv	(Kyiv)	(Donetsk Oblast)	Lokomotyv Artemivsk	2 – 1	Mashynobudivnyk Kyiv
1956	Kolhospnyk Poltava	(Poltava Oblast)	(Zaporizhzhia Oblast)	Mashbud Zaporizhia	4 – 0	no competition
The competition transformed into a feeder of the Soviet Amateur Cup.

== List of finals (after 1957) ==
Since 1957, the Ukrainian Cup, as the prize of the "Radyanska Ukrayina" newspaper, became a preliminary competition for the Soviet Amateur Cup. In 1970s, there was an attempt to organize a parallel competition for the "teams of masters" (Soviet professional status) which did not last for long.

Starting from 1960, all quarterfinalists (there were 5 of them) qualified to the Soviet Amateur Cup beside the finalists.

Year	Winner		Runner-up		Score	Soviet Amateur Cup
1957	SKVO Odesa	(Odesa Oblast)	(Rivne Oblast)	Kolhospnyk Rivne	2 – 0 (a.e.t.)	SKVO Odesa
1958	Torpedo Kharkiv	(Kharkiv Oblast)	(Ternopil Oblast)	Avanhard Ternopil	2 – 1 (a.e.t.)	Torpedo Kharkiv
1959	Shakhtar Korostyshiv	(Zhytomyr Oblast)	(Dnipropetrovsk Oblast)	Avanhard Zhovti Vody	2 – 1	Shakhtar Korostyshiv
1960	Start Chuhuiv	(Kharkiv Oblast)	(Sumy Oblast)	Avanhard Shostka	0 – 0, 3 – 1	Start Chuhuiv; Avanhard Shostka; Bilshovyk Kyiv; Metalurh Nikopol; Khimik Kalush
1961	Start Chuhuiv	(Kharkiv Oblast)	(Donetsk Oblast)	Shakhtar Smolianka	1 – 0	Start Chuhuiv (2); Shakhta No.11 Stalino; Avanhard Ordzhonikidze; Shakhtar Korostyshiv (2); Avanhard Chernivtsi
1962	Avanhard Dnipropetrovsk	(Dnipropetrovsk Oblast)	(Sumy Oblast)	Ekran Shostka	2 – 0	Avanhard Dnipropetrovsk; Ekran Shostka (2); Burevisnyk Melitopol; Kolhospnyk Berezhany; Temp Kyiv
1963	Meteor Dnipropetrovsk	(Dnipropetrovsk Oblast)	(Mykolaiv Oblast)	Torpedo Mykolaiv	2 – 1 (a.e.t.)	Meteor Dnipropetrovsk; Torpedo Mykolaiv; Start Chuhuiv (3); Taksomotor Odesa; Bilshovyk Kyiv (2)
1964	Bilshovyk Kyiv	(Kyiv)	(Dnipropetrovsk Oblast)	Avanhard Dnipropetrovsk	1 – 0	Bilshovyk Kyiv (3); Avanhard Dnipropetrovsk (2); Zirka Kotovsk; Tytan Zaporizhia; Avanhard Kremenchuk (Kryukiv)
1965	Tytan Zaporizhzhia	(Zaporizhzhia Oblast)	(Lviv Oblast)	VPU Lviv	2 – 1	Tytan Zaporizhzhia (2); Avanhard Ordzhonikidze (2); LVVPU Lviv; Start Chuhuiv (4); Avanhard Rovenky
1966	VPU Lviv	(Lviv Oblast)	(Poltava Oblast)	Suputnyk Poltava	2 – 0	LVVPU Lviv (2); Suputnyk Poltava; Bilshovyk Kyiv (4); Metalist Sevastopol; Shakhtar Donetsk (reserves)
1967	Bilshovyk Kyiv	(Kyiv)	(Dnipropetrovsk Oblast)	Avanhard Vilnohirsk	2 – 1	Bilshovyk Kyiv (5); Avanhard Vilnohirsk; Sokil Lviv; Gorlovuglestroi Horlivka; Donets Izyum
1968	VPU Lviv	(Lviv Oblast)	(Donetsk Oblast)	Zoria Artemivsk	3 – 0	LVVPU Lviv (3); Zoria Artemivsk; Avanhard Vilnohirsk (2); Donets Izyum (2); Bilshovyk Kyiv (6)
1969	Shakhtar Makiivka	(Donetsk Oblast)	(Lviv Oblast)	Sokil Lviv	1 – 0	Shakhtar Makiivka; Sokil Lviv (2); Zirka Poltava; Tytan Zaporizhia (3); Mebelnyk Berehove
1970	Avanhard Simferopol	(Autonomous Republic of Crimea)	(Dnipropetrovsk Oblast)	Avanhard Kryvyi Rih	2 – 0 (a.e.t.)	Avanhard Simferopol; Avanhard Kryvyi Rih; Bilshovyk Kyiv (7); Shakhtar Makiivka (2); Tsementnyk Mykolaiv
1971	Kolormet Artemivsk	(Donetsk Oblast)	(Dnipropetrovsk Oblast)	Metal Dnipropetrovsk	2 – 0	Tsvetmet Artemivsk; ZKL Dnipropetrovsk; Bilshovyk Kyiv (8); Khimik Novyi Rozdil; Prohres Berdychiv
1972	Hirnyk Dniprorudne	(Zaporizhzhia Oblast)	(Ivano-Frankivsk Oblast)	Khimik Kalush	2 – 0	Hirnyk Dniprorudne; Khimik Kalush (2); Bilshovyk Kyiv (9); Enerhia Nova Kakhovka; Avtomobilist Chernihiv
1973	Sokil Lviv	(Lviv Oblast)	(Luhansk Oblast)	Shakhtar Sverdlovsk	2 – 0	Sokil Lviv (3); Shakhtar Sverdlovsk; Shakhtar Oleksandria; Hranyt Cherkasy; Hirnyk Dniprorudne (2)
1974	Sokil Lviv	(Lviv Oblast)	(Kirovohrad Oblast)	Shakhtar Oleksandria	0 – 0, 1 – 0 (a.e.t.)	Sokil Lviv (4); Shakhtar Oleksandria (2); Zirka Lviv; Monolit Donetsk; Promin Poltava
1975	Vykhor Dnipropetrovsk	(Dnipropetrovsk Oblast)	(Cherkasy Oblast)	Lokomotyv Smila	0 – 0, 1 – 1 (pen. 7 – 6)	Lokomotyv Smila; Vykhor Dnipropetrovsk (3); Zirka Lviv (2); Hvardiyets Odesa; Sokil Lviv (5)
1976	Elektron Ivano-Frankivsk	(Ivano-Frankivsk Oblast)	(Autonomous Republic of Crimea)	Tytan Armyansk	2 – 1	Elektron Ivano-Frankivsk; Tytan Armyansk; Bilshovyk Kyiv (10); Vykhor Dnipropetrovsk (4); Sokil Lviv (6)
1977	Tytan Armyansk	(Autonomous Republic of Crimea)	(Ivano-Frankivsk Oblast)	Elektron Ivano-Frankivsk	1 – 0	Tytan Armyansk (2); Elektron Ivano-Frankivsk (2); Bilshovyk Kyiv (11); Kirovets Makiivka; Sokil Lviv (7)
1978	Bilshovyk Kyiv	(Kyiv)	(Kharkiv Oblast)	Mayak Kharkiv	2 – 0	Bilshovyk Kyiv (12); Mayak Kharkiv; Sokil Lviv (8); Enerhia Nova Kakhovka (2); Transformator Zaporizhia
1979	Enerhiya Nova Kakhovka	(Kherson Oblast)	(Lviv Oblast)	Tsementnyk Mykolaiv	3 – 1, 0 – 0	Enerhia Nova Kakhovka (3); Tsementnyk Mykolaiv (2); Voskhod Kyiv; Shakhtar Stakhanov; Bilshovyk Kyiv (13)
1980	Nyva Pidhaitsi	(Ternopil Oblast)	(Kherson Oblast)	Enerhiya Nova Kakhovka	3 – 0	no competition
1981	Sluch Berezne	(Rivne Oblast)	(Donetsk Oblast)	Shakhtar Dzerzhynsk	0 – 0, 1 – 1	no competition
1982	Enerhiya Nova Kakhovka	(Kherson Oblast)	(Rivne Oblast)	Sluch Berezne	2 – 0, 2 – 1	no competition
1983	Skhid Kyiv	(Kyiv Oblast)	(Kherson Oblast)	Enerhiya Nova Kakhovka	1 – 0, 2 – 2	no competition
1984	Torpedo Zaporizhzhia	(Zaporizhzhia Oblast)	(Zakarpattia Oblast)	Karpaty Dubove	5 – 1, 0 – 0	no competition
1985	Avtomobilist Lviv	(Lviv Oblast)	(Autonomous Republic of Crimea)	Tytan Armyansk	2 – 0, 3 – 3	no competition
1986	Mashbud Borodianka	(Kyiv Oblast)	(Zhytomyr Oblast)	Zirka Berdychiv	1 – 1, 2 – 1 (a.e.t.)	no competition
1987	Pivdenstal Yenakieve	(Donetsk Oblast)	(Lviv Oblast)	Avanhard Drohobych	0 – 2, 3 – 0 (a.e.t.)	no competition
1988	Avanhard Lozova	(Kharkiv Oblast)	(Zhytomyr Oblast)	Zirka Berdychiv	1 – 1, 2 – 2	no competition
1989	Prohres Berdychiv	(Zhytomyr Oblast)	(Kharkiv Oblast)	Avanhard Lozova	4 – 2, 0 – 0	Avanhard Lozova; Stakhanovets Stakhanov (2); Dynamo Odesa; SKA Kyiv
1990	—					Prohres Berdychiv (2); Avanhard Lozova (2); Mayak Ochakiv; Krystal Chortkiv
1991	—					Hirnyk Khartsyzk; Avanhard Lozova (3); Myrhorod; Orbita Zaporizhia

== Performances ==
=== Before 1957 ===
Team	Winners	Winning years	Runners-up	Runner-up years	Finals
Dynamo Kyiv	7	1936, 1937, 1938, 1944, 1946, 1947, 1948	1	1945	8
Metalurh Zaporizhia	2	1951, 1952	1	1950	3
Mashynobudivnyk Kyiv	2	1954, 1955	0	–	2
Lokomotyv Kharkiv	1	1945	2	1944, 1946	3
Dynamo Dnipropetrovsk	1	1940	1	1935	2
Avanhard Kramatorsk	1	1939	0	–	1
VPS Kharkiv	1	1949	0	–	1
Spartak Uzhhorod	1	1950	0	–	1
Torpedo Kirovohrad	1	1953	0	–	1
Kolhospnyk Poltava	1	1956	0	–	1
Dynamo Odesa	0	–	2	1936, 1937	2
Kharchovyk Odesa	0	–	2	1939, 1947	2
DO Lviv	0	–	2	1951, 1952	2
Lokomotyv Kyiv	0	–	1	1938	1
Lokomotyv Odessa	0	–	1	1940	1
Bilshovyk Mukacheve	0	–	1	1948	1
Vodnyk Odessa	0	–	1	1949	1
Lokomotyv Poltava	0	–	1	1953	1
SKA Kyiv	0	–	1	1954	1
Lokomotyv Artemivsk	0	–	1	1955	1
Mashynobudivnyk (Komunar) Zaporizhia	0	–	1	1956	1

=== After 1957 ===
Team	Winners	Winning years	Runners-up	Runner-up years	Finals
Bilshovyk Kyiv	3	1964, 1967, 1978	0	–	3
LVVPU Lviv	2	1966, 1968	1	1965	3
Sokil Lviv	2	1973, 1974	1	1969	3
Avanhard (Vykhor) Dnipropetrovsk	2	1962, 1975	1	1964	3
Start Chuhuyiv	2	1960, 1961	0	–	2
Enerhiya Nova Kakhovka	1	1979	2	1980, 1983	3
Tytan Armyansk	1	1977	2	1976, 1985	3
Elektron Ivano-Frankivsk	1	1976	1	1977	2
Sluch Berezne	1	1981	1	1982	2
Avanhard Lozova	1	1988	1	1989	2
SKVO Odessa	1	1957	0	–	1
Torpedo Kharkiv	1	1958	0	–	1
Shakhtar Korostyshiv	1	1959	0	–	1
Meteor Dnipropetrovsk	1	1963	0	–	1
Tytan Zaporizhia	1	1965	0	–	1
Shakhtar (Kholodna Balka) Makiivka	1	1969	0	–	1
Avanhard Simferopol	1	1970	0	–	1
Kolormet Artemivsk	1	1971	0	–	1
Hirnyk Dniprorudne	1	1972	0	–	1
Nyva Pidhaitsi	1	1980	0	–	1
Skhid Kyiv	1	1983	0	–	1
Torpedo Zaporizhia	1	1984	0	–	1
Avtomobilist Lviv	1	1985	0	–	1
Mashynobudivnyk Borodianka	1	1986	0	–	1
Pivdenstal Yenakieve	1	1987	0	–	1
Prohres Berdychiv	1	1989	0	–	1
Avanhard (Ekran) Shostka	0	–	2	1960, 1962	2
Zirka Berdychiv	0	–	2	1986, 1988	2
Kolhospnyk Rivne	0	–	1	1957	1
Avanhard Ternopil	0	–	1	1958	1
Avanhard Zhovti Vody	0	–	1	1959	1
Shakhtar Smolianka	0	–	1	1961	1
Torpedo Mykolaiv	0	–	1	1963	1
Suputnyk Poltava	0	–	1	1966	1
Avanhard Vilnohirsk	0	–	1	1967	1
Zorya Artemivsk	0	–	1	1968	1
Avanhard Kryvyi Rih	0	–	1	1970	1
Metal (ZKL) Dnipropetrovsk	0	–	1	1971	1
Khimik Kalush	0	–	1	1972	1
Shakhtar Sverdlovsk	0	–	1	1973	1
Shakhtar Oleksandriya	0	–	1	1974	1
Lokomotyv Smila	0	–	1	1975	1
Mayak Kharkiv	0	–	1	1978	1
Tsementnyk Mykolaiv	0	–	1	1979	1
Shakhtar Dzerzhynsk	0	–	1	1981	1
Karpaty Dubove	0	–	1	1984	1
Avanhard Drohobych	0	–	1	1987	1

== Football Cup of the Ukrainian SSR participants ==
In 1936 to 1950

Region	Teams
Cherkasy (3)	Rot-Front Smila (1939), DO Cherkasy (1947), Lokomotyv Smila (1950)
Chernihiv (6)	Dynamo Chernihiv (1937, 1947), komuna imeni Balytskoho Pryluki (1937), Spartak Chernihiv (1938–1940, 1949), Vympel Chernihiv (1950), Mashynobudivnyk Pryluky (1950), Chernihiv (1950)
Chernivtsi (3)	Dynamo Chernivtsi (1944, 1945, 1950), Spartak Chernivtsi (1946, 1949), Chervonyi Prapor Chernivtsi (1950)
Dnipropetrovsk (18)	Dynamo Dnipropetrovsk (1936–1938, 1940, 1944), zavod imeni Lenina Dnipropetrovsk (1936), Dynamo Kryvyi Rih (1937), Lokomotyv [Pivdnia] Dnipropetrovsk (1937–1939), zavod imeni Liebknechta Dnipropetrovsk (1937, 1938, 1944), Stal [zavod imeni Petrovskoho] Dnipropetrovsk (1937–1940, 1944–1948), Metalurh [Stal] Dniprodzerzhynsk (1937–1940, 1944–1950), Burevisnyk Kryvyi Rih (1938), Ruda Kryvyi Rih (1938), Budivelnyk Kryvyi Rih (1938, 1945), Stal Kryvyi Rih (1938, 1944), Tekhnikum Fizkultury Dnipropetrovsk (1938), Spartak Dnipropetrovsk (1938, 1944, 1946), Budivelnyk Dniprodzerzhynsk (1938), zavod imeni Kominterna Dnipropetrovsk (1938), Lokomotyv Synelnykove (1938), Spartak Kryvyi Rih (1947), Torpedo [Traktor] Dnipropetrovsk (1947, 1950)
Donetsk (26)	Stakhanovets Horlivka (1936, 1938), Shakhtar [Stakhanovets] Donetsk [Stalino] (1937, 1938, 1944–1948), Lokomotyv Yasynuvata (1937, 1938, 1944, 1945, 1947), Avanhard [zavod imeni Ordzhonikidze] Kramatorsk (1937–1940, 1945–1948), Zenit Stalino (1937–1940, 1944), Metalurh [zavod imeni Frunze, Stal] Kostiantynivka (1937–1939, 1944, 1945, 1947–1949), Avanhard Horlivka (1938, 1940), Azot Nova Horlivka (1938), Burevisnyk Stalino (1938), zavod imeni Lenina Krasnohorivka (1938), Stakhanovets Chystiakove (1938), Avanhard Druzhkivka (1938, 1939, 1944), Lokomotyv Sloviansk (1938), Avanhard [zavod imeni Stalina] Kramatorsk (1938), Stakhanovets Krasnoarmiysk (1938), Avanhard Stalino (1938), Shakhta No.30 Rutchenkove (1938), Stal Makiivka (1938, 1944, 1946), Stal Stalino (1938), Koksokhimichnyi zavod Makiivka (1938), Stakhanovets Yenakieve [Ordzhonikidze] (1938–1940), Stal Mariupol (1939, 1944–1947), Lokomotyv Artemivsk (1944), Shakhtar [Chervonohvardiyskyi Raion, Makiivvuhillia] Makiivka (1947), Stalino Oblast (1950), Shakhtar-Smolianka Donetsk (1950)
Ivano-Frankivsk (3)	Dynamo Stanislav (1940, 1947), Spartak [Stanislav] Ivano-Frankivsk (1940, 1949, 1950), Stanislav (1945)
Kharkiv (21)	Dzerzhynets [KhPZ] Kharkiv (1936, 1946, 1947), Dynamo Kharkiv (1936–1938, 1940, 1944–1946), Stalinets Kharkiv (1937, 1938), Kanatnyi zavod imeni Petrovskoho Kharkiv (1937, 1938), Zdorovia Kharkiv (1937, 1938), Lokomotyv [Pivdnia] Kharkiv (1937–1940, 1944–1947), Torpedo [KhTZ, Traktor] Kharkiv (1937–1940, 1944–1948), Silmash Kharkiv (1937, 1938, 1946), Spartak Kharkiv (1937, 1938), zavod imeni Konminterna Kharkiv (1937), Silmash-2 Kharkiv (1938), Avtomotor Kharkiv (1938), Blyskavka Kharkiv (1938, 1939), Avanhard Kharkiv (1938), Zenit Kharkiv (1938–1940), Metalist Kharkiv (1938), Lokomotyv Lozova (1938–1940) VVS Kharkiv (1949), Urozhai Kharkiv (1950), Kahanovytskyi Raion Kharkiv (1950), Dzerzhynskyi Raion Kharkiv (1950)
Kherson (6)	Kharchovyk Kherson (1938), Znannia Kherson (1938, 1940), Vodnyk Kherson (1938, 1944), Spartak Kherson (1945–1950), Dynamo Kherson (1946, 1947), Avanhard Kherson (1947)
Khmelnytskyi (3)	Dynamo Kamianets-Podilskyi (1939, 1940, 1950), Kamianets-Podilskyi (1945), Dynamo Khmelnytskyi [Prokuriv] (1947, 1949, 1950)
Kirovohrad (3)	Traktor [Silmash] [Kirovo] Kirovohrad (1938–1940, 1944, 1945, 1949, 1950), Dynamo Kirovohrad (1946, 1947), Kirovohrad Oblast (1950)
Kyiv (3)	Avanhard Fastiv (1940), Fastiv (1946), Urozhai Boryspil (1949)
Kyiv city (16)	Lokomotyv [Pivdnia] (1936–1940, 1946), Dynamo (1936–1938, 1944–1948), Vympel (1937), Zenit (1937, 1938), ODO [UDKA] (1937, 1947–1949), Spartak (1937, 1938, 1944, 1946), Lokomotyv-2 (1938), Rot-Front (1938, 1939), Tekhnikum Fizkultury (1938), Vodnyk (1938), Dynamo-2 (1938, 1939), Nauka (1940), Dynamo [6th rairada] (1944–1947), VVS KVO (1945), Molniya (1947), v/c 25750 (1948)
Luhansk (13)	Metalurh [zavod imeni Voroshylova, Stal] Alchevsk [Voroshylovsk] (1937–1939, 1944, 1946, 1947, 1950), Stakhanovets Stakhanov [Sergo, Kadiivka] (1937, 1938, 1946–1948), Dzerzhynets Luhansk [Voroshylovhrad] (1937, 1938, 1947), Stakhanovets Lysychansk (1938), Spartak Starobilsk (1938), Burevisnyk Krasnyi Luch (1938), Stakhanovets Krasnyi Luch (1938), Lokomotyv (imeni Kahanovycha) Popasna (1939), Zenit Voroshylovhrad (1940), Azot Rovenky (1940), Dynamo Voroshylovhrad (1944–1946, 1948), VCh Voroshylovhrad (1944), Shakhtar Krasnodon (1949)
Lviv (9)	Zolochiv (1940), Spartak Lviv (1940, 1944–1948), Spartak Drohobych (1940, 1945–1947), Dynamo Lviv (1944–1946, 1949), Burevisnyk Lviv (1947), Dynamo Drohobych (1949), Naftovyk Stryi (1950), ODO Lviv (1950), Naftovyk Drohobych (1950)
Moldavian ASSR (1)	Spartak Tiraspol (1938, 1939)
Mykolaiv (6)	Sudnobudivnyk [zavod imeni Marti] Mykolaiv (1937–1940, 1944–1948), Dynamo Mykolaiv (1938, 1950), Lokomotyv [Pivdnia] Voznesensk (1938–1940), Sudnobudivnyk [zavod imeni 61 Komunara] Mykolaiv (1946, 1947), Dynamo Voznesensk (1948), v/c 10756 Mykolaiv (1949)
Odesa (15)	Dynamo Odesa (1936–1938, 1944), Lokomotyv Odesa (1937, 1938, 1940), zavod KinAp Odesa (1937), Lokomotyv Kotovsk (1938, 1940), Kharchovyk Odesa (1938, 1939, 1945–1948), Snaiper Odesa (1939), Spartak Odesa (1940), Portovyk Odesa (1946), Spartak Izmail (1946), VVS Odesa (1946), Odesa (1947), Torpedo Odesa (1948), Vodnyk Odesa (1949), Dynamo Izmail (1949), Izmail (1950)
Poltava (7)	Lokomotyv Poltava (1938, 1949, 1950), Tsukrovyk Karlivka (1938), Rot-Front Poltava (1938), Dynamo Poltava (1938, 1947), Spartak Poltava (1938, 1940, 1944, 1946), Dzerzhynets Kremenchuk [Kryukiv] (1938, 1950), Dynamo Kremenchuk (1939)
Rivne (4)	Spartak Rivne (1940), Dynamo Rivne (1946), Lokomotyv Rivne (1947), DO Rivne (1949)
Sumy (9)	Spartak Sumy (1938), Avanhard Sumy (1938), Tsukrovyk Sumy (1938–1940), Lokomotyv Konotop (1938), Azot Shostka (1938), Dynamo Sumy (1944, 1946–1948), Sumy (1945), Mashynobudivnyk Sumy (1949), Zirka Konotop (1950)
Ternopil (2)	Lokomotyv Ternopil (1940, 1945, 1949), Ternopil (1945)
Vinnytsia (7)	Spartak Vinnytsia (1937), Dynamo Mohyliv-Podilskyi (1937, 1938), Temp Vinnytsia (1938), Dynamo Vinnytsia (1938, 1939, 1948–1950), Znannia Vinnytsia (1940), Vinnytsia (1945, 1946), Lokomotyv Vinnytsia (1948)
Volyn (2)	Spartak Lutsk (1940), Dynamo Lutsk (1945–1947, 1949, 1950)
Zakarpattia (6)	Uzhhorod (1945), Dynamo Mukachevo (1946, 1949), Spartak Uzhhorod (1946–1948, 1950), Dynamo Uzhhorod (1947, 1948), Bilshovyk Mukachevo (1947, 1948), Iskra Mukachevo (1950)
Zaporizhia (9)	Kryla Rad Zaporizhia (1937, 1938), Lokomotyv [zavodiv] Zaporizhia (1937–1940, 1944–1946, 1948), Silmash Zaporizhia (1938), Kryla Rad Berdyansk (1938), Kolyormet Zaporizhia (1938), zavod imeni Baranova Zaporizhia (1940), Bilshovyk Zaporizhia (1946, 1947), Traktor Osypenko (1947, 1950), Metalurh Zaporizhia (1949, 1950)
Zhytomyr (7)	DKA Korosten (1938), Spartak Korosten (1938), Dynamo Zhytomyr (1938), Avanhard Berdychiv (1939, 1940), Spartak Zhytomyr (1944), Zhytomyr (1945, 1947, 1950), DO Zhytomyr (1946, 1949)

== Ukrainian Clubs in the Soviet Cup ==
The number of participants per season and a comprehensive list per region. Until 1938, the teams from the Crimean ASSR represented the Russian Federation.

Region	Teams
Sevastopol (2)	SKCF Sevastopol (1954, 1955, 1957, 1958, 1960–1965, 1966/67, 1967/68), Chaika Sevastopol (1964, 1965, 1966/67, 1989/90)
Crimea Oblast (2)	Tavriya [Avanhard] Simferopol (1958, 1960–1970, 1974–1991/92), Okean [Metalurh, Avanhard] Kerch (1963–1965, 1966/67, 1967/68, 1988/89, 1989/90)
Cherkasy Oblast (2)	Kolkhoz imeni Chapaeva Blahodatne (1936), Dnipro [Kolhospnyk] Cherkasy (1958, 1960–1965, 1966/67, 1967/68)
Chernihiv Oblast (2)	Spartak Chernihiv (1938), Desna Chernihiv (1961–1970)
Chernivtsi Oblast (2)	Dynamo Chernivtsi (1949), Bukovyna [Avanhard] Chernivtsi (1961–1965, 1966/67–1970, 1988/89–1991/92)
Dnipropetrovsk Oblast (23)	Dynamo Dnipro (1936–1938), Lokomotyv Dnipro (1936–1938), Stal Dnipro (1936, 1937), Dnipro [Zavod imeni Petrovskoho, Stal, Metalurh] (1936–1939, 1947, 1949, 1953–1955, 1957, 1958, 1960–1991/92), Spartak Dnipro (1937, 1938), Dynamo Kryvyi Rih (1936), Hirnyk Kryvyi Rih (1936), Budivelnyk Kryvyi Rih (1937, 1938), Stal [Zavod imeni Dzerzhynskoho] Kamianske (1936, 1938), Burevisnyk Kryvyi Rih (1938), Stal Kryvyi Rih (1938), Ruda Kryvyi Rih (1938), Zavod imeni Libknekhta Dnipro (1938), Tekhnikum FK Dnipro (1938), Lokomotyv Synelnykove (1938), Budivelnyk Kamianske (1938), Zavod imeni Kominterna Dnipro (1938), Prometei [Khimik, Dniprovets] Kamianske (1957, 1958, 1960–1965, 1966/67, 1967/68), Kryvbas [Avanhard, Hirnyk] Kryvyi Rih (1960–1965, 1966/67–1970, 1972, 1976, 1977, 1987/88, 1989/90), Avanhard Zhovti Vody (1961–1965, 1966/67, 1967/68), Trubnyk Nikopol (1962–1965, 1966/67, 1967/68), Kolos Nikopol (1978–1989/90), Kolos Pavlohrad (1985/86)
Donetsk Oblast (23)	Shakhtar [Ugolschiki, Stakhanovets] Donetsk (1936–1939, 1944, 1945, 1947, 1949–1955, 1957, 1958, 1960–1991/92), Sitall [Stal] Kostiantynivka (1936–1938, 1967/68), Avanhard [Zavod imeni Kirova, Stal] Makiivka (1936, 1938, 1966/67, 1967/68), Azovets [Zavod imeni Lenina, Azovstal] Mariupol (1936, 1961–1964, 1966/67, 1969, 1970), Avanhard Kramatorsk (1937–1939, 1949, 1961–1965, 1966/67), Zavod imeni Stalina Kramatorsk (1937, 1938), Lokomotyv Yasynuvata (1937, 1938), Zenit [Zavod imeni Kovalia] Donetsk (1938), Burevisnyk Donetsk (1938), Shakhta-30 Rutchenkove (1938), Zavod imeni Lenina Krasnohorivka (1938), Shakhtar [Stakhanovets] Yenakieve [Ordzhonikidze] (1938, 1965, 1966/67), Stakhanovets Bakhmut (1938), Azot N Horlivka (1938), Avanhard Donesk (1938), Lokomotyv Sloviansk (1938), Avanhard Druzhkivka (1938), Avanhard Horlivka (1938), Stal Donetsk (1938), Stakhanovets Krasnoarmiysk (1938), Lokomotyv Donetsk (1958, 1960–1965, 1966/67, 1967/68), Shakhtar Horlivka (1960–1965, 1966/67, 1970), Metalurh [Industriya] Yenakieve (1963, 1964), Shakhtar Torez (1965, 1966/67), Start Dzerzhinsk (1966/67, 1967/68)
Ivano-Frankivsk Oblast (1)	Prykarpattia [Spartak] Ivano-Frankivsk (1957, 1958, 1960–1965, 1966/67, 1967/68, 1970, 1973–1981, 1988/89)
Kharkiv Oblast (17)	Dynamo Kharkiv (1936–1939), Stalinets [Zavod ElektroMash] Kharkiv (1936–1938), Metalist [KhPZ, Dzerzhynets, Avanhard] Kharkiv (1936, 1947, 1949, 1957, 1958, 1960–1973, 1975, 1977, 1979–1991/92), Lokomotyv Kharkiv (1936–1938, 1944, 1945, 1947–1955), Silmash [Serp i Molot] Kharkiv (1936–1939), Spartak Kharkiv (1936–1939), Torpedo [Traktornyi Zavod, Traktor] Kharkiv (1936–1938, 1949, 1961–1965, 1966/67, 1967/68), Zdorovya Kharkiv (1937, 1938), Lokomotyv Lozova (1938), Zenit Kharkiv (1938), Avtomotor Kharkiv (1938), Avanhard Kharkiv (1938), Molniya Kharkiv (1938), Kanatny Zavod Kharkiv (1938), Silmash-2 Kharkiv (1938), Metalist Kharkiv (1938), VPS Kharkiv (1949)
Kherson Oblast (5)	Kharchovyk Kherson (1938), Znannia Kherson (1938), Vodnyk Kherson (1938), Spartak Kherson (1947, 1949, 1958, 1960), Lokomotyv [Mayak, Budivelnyk] Kherson (1961–1970), Enerhiya Nova Kakhovka (1967/68)
Khmelnytskyi Oblast (1)	Podillia [Dynamo] Khmelnytskyi (1961–1965, 1966/67–1969, 1988/89, 1989/90)
Kirovohrad Oblast (3)	Zirka [Silmash, Torpedo] Kropyvnytskyi (1938, 1953, 1958, 1960, 1961, 1963–1970), Dynamo Kropyvnytskyi (1962), Shakhtar Oleksandriya (1962–1965, 1966/67)
Kyiv City (13)	Arsenal [Mashinobudivnyk] (1936, 1954, 1955, 1960–1963), Bilshovyk (1936), Dynamo (1936–1939, 1944–1955, 1957, 1958, 1960–1991/92), Lokomotyv (1936–1939), Spartak (1936–1938, 1949), Vympel (1936), Zenit (1938), Vodnyk (1938), RVUFK [Tekhnikum FK] (1938), Rot Front (1938), Lokomotyv-2 (1938), Dynamo-2 (1938, 1965), SKA (1947, 1949, 1952, 1954, 1955, 1957, 1958, 1961–1970, 1977, 1978, 1981, 1982, 1984, 1986/87, 1987/88), Temp (1964)
Kyiv Oblast (0)	
Luhansk Oblast (9)	Stakhanovets Kadiivka (1936, 1938, 1949, 1957, 1958, 1960–1965, 1966/67–1970), Zorya [Dzerzhinets] Luhansk (1937–1939, 1964–1991/92), Stakhanovets Lysychansk (1938), Burevisnyk Krasnyi Luch (1938), Shakhtar [Stakhanovets] Krasnyi Luch (1938, 1965, 1966/67), Spartak Starobilsk (1938), Stal [Komunarets] Alchevsk (1938, 1963–1965, 1966/67), Dynamo Luhansk (1947, 1949), Trudovi Rezervy Luhansk (1949, 1957, 1958, 1960, 1962, 1963), Khimik Severodonetsk (1961–1965, 1966/67–1969), Avanhard Rovenky (1967/68), Shakhtar Sverdlovsk (1967/68)
Lviv Oblast (6)	Spartak Lviv (1947, 1949), SKA Lviv [SKA Karpaty] (1949, 1954, 1955, 1957, 1958, 1960–1970, 1982–1989/90), SFC [Naftovyk] Drohobych (1961–1965, 1966/67, 1967/68, 1990/91), Karpaty Lviv (1963–1981, 1990/91, 1991/92), Shakhtar Chervonohrad (1967/68), Shakhtar Novovolynsk (1967/68)
MASSR (1)	Spartak Tiraspol (1938)
Mykolaiv Oblast (3)	Sudnobudivnyk [Zavod imeni Marti, Avanhard] Mykolaiv (1936–1939, 1947, 1949, 1957, 1958, 1960–1970, 1984/85–1986/87), Lokomotyv Voznesensk (1938), Dynamo Mykolaiv (1938)
Odesa Oblast (9)	Dynamo Odesa (1936–1939), KinAp Odesa (1936), Lokomotyv Odesa (1938), Lokomotyv Kotovsk (1938), Chornomorets [Kharchovyk] Odesa (1938, 1945, 1947, 1949, 1950, 1955, 1957, 1958, 1960–1991/92), Metalurh Odesa (1953, 1954), SKA Odesa (1958, 1960–1970, 1978–1982, 1986/87, 1988/89–1991/92), Dunayets Izmail (1964, 1965, 1966/67), Avtomobilist Odesa (1965, 1966/67)
Poltava Oblast (7)	Dzerzhynets Kremenchuk (1938), Rot Front Poltava (1938), Dynamo Poltava (1938), Spartak Poltava (1938), Lokomtyv Poltava (1938), Tsukrovyky Karlivka (1938), Vorskla [Kolhospnyk, Kolos, Silbud, Budivelnyk] Poltava (1957, 1958, 1960–1965, 1966/67–1970, 1989/90–1991/92), Kremin [Dnipro] Kremenchuk (1963–1965, 1966/67, 1967/68, 1990/91)
Rivne Oblast (1)	Horyn [Kolhospnyk] Rivne (1958, 1960–1965, 1966/67, 1967/68)
Sumy Oblast (7)	Lokomotyv Konotop (1938), Azot Shostka (1938), Tsukrovyky Sumy (1938), Spartak Sumy (1938), Avanhard Sumy (1938), Spartak [Avanhard] Sumy (1961–1965, 1966/67, 1967/68, 1970), Naftovyk Okhtyrka (1988/89, 1991/92)
Ternopil Oblast (2)	Avanhard Ternopil (1960–1970), Nyva Ternopil (1986/87–1988/89, 1990/91, 1991/92)
Vinnytsia Oblast (4)	Dynamo Mohyliv-Podilskyi (1938), Dynamo Vinnytsia (1938), Temp Vinnytsia (1938), Nyva [Lokomotyv] Vinnytsia (1958, 1960–1969, 1984/85–1987/88, 1990/91, 1991/92)
Volyn Oblast (1)	Volyn [Torpedo] Lutsk (1961–1965, 1966/67, 1967/68, 1987/88, 1990/91)
Zakarpattia Oblast (2)	Spartak [Verkhovyna] Uzhhorod (1946, 1947, 1949–1951, 1954, 1955, 1957, 1958, 1960–1965, 1966/67, 1967/68, 1986/87), Karpaty [Bilshovyk] Mukachevo (1949, 1967/68)
Zaporizhzhia Oblast (7)	Kryla Rad Zaporizhia (1936–1938), Tsvetmet Zaporizhia (1938), Silmash Zaporizhia (1938), Kryla Rad Berdyansk (1938), Lokomotyv Zaporizhia (1938, 1949), Bilshovyk Zaporizhia (1947), Metalurh Zaporizhia (1950–1955, 1957, 1958, 1960–1991/92), Spartak [Burevisnyk] Melitopol (1963–1965, 1966/67), Torpedo Berdyansk (1966/67, 1967/68), Kolos Yakymivka (1967/68)
Zhytomyr Oblast (6)	Portselianovyi Zavod Baranivka (1936), Dynamo Zhytomyr (1938), DKA Korosten (1938), Spartak Korosten (1938), Polissia [Avanhard, Avtomobilist] Zhytomyr (1960–1965, 1966/67–1970, 1991/92), Prohres Berdychiv (1967/68)

- 1936 [31] (A–1, B–2, V–4, G–2, others–22)
- 1937 [25] (A–1, B–1, V–5, G–4, others–14)
- 1938 [93] (A–6, others–87)
- 1939 [11] (A–3, B–7, others–1)
- 1940–1943 no tournament
- 1944 [3] (random pick)
- 1945 [4] (A–1, B–3)
- 1946 [2] (A–1, others–1)
- 1947 [13] (A–1, B–12)
- 1948 [2] (A–1, B–1)
- 1949 [22] (A–3, B–18, others–1)
- 1950 [6] (A–3, B–1, others–2)
- 1951 [5] (A–2, B–2, others–1)
- 1952 [5] (A–2, B–2, others–1)
- 1953 [7] (A–2, B–4, others–1)
- 1954 [11] (A–2, B–8, others–1)
- 1955 [11] (A–2, B–8, others–1)
- 1956 no tournament
- 1957 [16] (A–2, B–14)
- 1958 [24] (A–2, B–22)
- 1959 no tournament
- 1959-1960 [28] (A–2, B–26)
- 1961 [39] (A–3, B–36)
- 1962 [42] (A–3, B–39)
- 1963 [48] (A–3, B–5, V-40)
- 1964 [50] (A–2, B–7, V-41)
- 1965 [52] (A–4, B–6, V-42)
- 1965-1966 [18] (A–4, B–11, V-3)
- 1966-1967 [55] (A–4, B–12, V-39)
- 1967-1968 [52] (A–4, B–19, V-29)
- 1969 [26] (A–4, B–22)
- 1970 [26] (A–4, B–4, V–18)
- 1971 [8] (A–4, B–4)
- 1972 [9] (A–4, B–5)
- 1973 [9] (A–5, B–4)
- 1974 [9] (A–6, B–3)
- 1975 [10] (A–6, B–4)
- 1976 [10] (A–6, B–3, V–1)
- 1977 [12] (A–6, B–4, V–2)
- 1978 [12] (A–5, B–5, V–2)
- 1979 [12] (A–4, B–7, V–1)
- 1980 [12] (A–4, B–8)
- 1981 [13] (A–5, B–8)
- 1982 [12] (A–5, B–7)
- 1983 [10] (A–5, B–5)
- 1984 [11] (A–5, B–5, V–1)
- 1984/85 [12] (A–5, B–5, V–2)
- 1985/86 [13] (A–5, B–3, V–5)
- 1986/87 [15] (A–5, B–3, V–7)
- 1987/88 [15] (A–4, B–5, V–6)
- 1988/89 [17] (A–5, B–5, V–7)
- 1989/90 [17] (A–5, B–3, V–9)
- 1990/91 [17] (A–5, B–2, V–10)
- 1991/92 [16] (A–6, B–2, V–8)

== Dynamo Proletarian Sports Society championship ==
Parallel to the championship of cities there also existed separate tournament that was played among teams of Dynamo society (Proletarian Sports Society (PST) Dynamo) located throughout the Ukrainian SSR. The first tournament was conducted as part of the All-Ukrainian Dynamo Festival which was organized on the orders of the top OGPU official in Ukraine Vsevolod Balitsky.

Season	Champion	Runner-up	3rd Position
1929 (Note: officially named as the All-Ukrainian Dynamo Festival)	Dynamo Kharkiv	Dynamo Kyiv	Dynamo Dnipropetrovsk; Dynamo Stalino
1931 (Note: officially named as the Cup of the All-Ukrainian PST Dynamo)	Dynamo Kyiv	Dynamo Kharkiv	Dynamo Odesa; Dynamo Stalino
1932 (Note: officially named as the Challenge of the All-Ukrainian PST Dynamo)	Dynamo Kharkiv	Dynamo Kyiv	Dynamo Odesa; Dynamo Stalino
1933 (Note: officially named as the All-Ukrainian Spartakiade of Dynamo)	Dynamo Kyiv	Dynamo Kharkiv	Dynamo Odesa; Dynamo Stalino
1934	Dynamo Kharkiv	Dynamo Kyiv	Dynamo Stalino; Dynamo Dnipropetrovsk
1935	Dynamo Kyiv	Dynamo Dnipropetrovsk	Dynamo Kharkiv

=== List of finals ===
Year	Venue	Winner	Score	Runner-up
1929; Final	7 July 1929 17:30 (MST); Kiev – Chervonyi Stadium; Attendance: ?	Dynamo Kharkiv; Petro Mishchenko 58'; Oleksandr Shpakovsky 82', 87'	3 – 1 (0 – 1)	Dynamo Kyiv; Oleksandr Serdyuk 14'
1931; Final	12 June 1931 ?:? (MST); Kiev – Chervonyi Stadium; Attendance: 12,000	Dynamo Kyiv; Kazimierz Piontkowski (?)	3 – 0 (? – 0)	Dynamo Kharkiv
1932; Final	26 June 1932 ?:? (MST); Kharkiv – Metalist Stadium; Attendance: ?	Dynamo Kharkiv; Oleksandr Shpakovsky (?)	1 – 0 (1 – 0)	Dynamo Kyiv
1933; Final	12 June 1933 ?:? (MST); Kyiv – Balytskyi Dynamo Stadium; Attendance: 18,000	Dynamo Kyiv; Mykola Makhynia 67'; Konstantin Schegotsky 88'	2 – 1 (0 – 0)	Dynamo Kharkiv; Ivan Privalov 69'
1934; Final	8 September 1934 ?:? (MST); Kyiv – Balytskyi Dynamo Stadium; Attendance: 10,000	Dynamo Kharkiv; Volodymyr Kulykov 12'; Kostyantyn Fomin 17'; Mykola Fomin 34'; Yan Yakubovych 65'; Volodymyr Fomin 67'	5 – 0 (3 – 0)	Dynamo Kyiv
1935; Final	26 October 1935 13:00 (MST); Kyiv – Balytskyi Dynamo Stadium; Attendance: 40,000	Dynamo Kyiv; Mykola Makhynia 1'; Ivan Kuzmenko 55', 66'	3 – 1 (1 – 1)	Dynamo Dnipropetrovsk; Petro Laiko 22'

=== Performances ===
Team	Winners	Winning years	Runners-up	Runner-up years	Finals
Dynamo Kyiv	3	1931, 1933, 1935	3	1929, 1932, 1934	6
Dynamo Kharkiv	3	1929, 1932, 1934	2	1931, 1933	5
Dynamo Dnipropetrovsk	0	–	1	1935	1

== Football Cup of the Ukrainian SSR (teams of masters) ==
Year	Venue	Winner	Score	Runner-up
In 1972 there was established a competition for Ukrainian teams of masters.
1972	Kiev	Avtomobilist Zhytomyr	1 – 0, aet	Shakhtar Donetsk
1973	Kiev	Zirka Kirovohrad	1 – 0	Spartak Ivano-Frankivsk
1974	home/away basis	Tavriya Simferopol	2 – 0, 2 – 1	Avtomobilist Zhytomyr
1975	home/away basis	Zirka Kirovohrad	2 – 0, 1 – 2	Tavriya Simferopol
1976	Horlivka	SKA Kyiv	2 – 0	Shakhtar Horlivka
There were no competitions from 1977 till 1989.
1990	home/away basis	Polissya Zhytomyr	4 – 0, 1 – 3	Naftovyk Okhtyrka
1991	home/away basis	Temp Shepetivka	1 – 1, 2 – 1	Veres Rivne

=== Performances ===
Team	Winners	Winning years	Runners-up	Runner-up years	Finals
Polissya Zhytomyr	2	1972, 1990	1	1974	3
Zirka Kirovohrad	2	1973, 1975	0	–	2
Tavriya Simferopol	1	1974	1	1975	2
SKA Kiev	1	1976	0	–	1
Temp Shepetivka	1	1991	0	–	1
Shakhtar Donetsk	0	–	1	1972	1
Spartak Ivano-Frankivsk	0	–	1	1973	1
Shakhtar Horlivka	0	–	1	1976	1
Naftovyk Okhtyrka	0	–	1	1990	1
Veres Rivne	0	–	1	1991	1

== See also ==
- Football Championship of the Ukrainian SSR
