= 1975 Football Cup of Ukrainian SSR among KFK =

1975 Ukrainian Amateur Cup
Tournament details
- Country: Soviet Union (Ukrainian SSR)

Final positions
- Champions: FC Lokomotyv Smila
- Runners-up: FC Vikhr Dnipropetrovsk

The 1975 Football Cup of Ukrainian SSR among KFK was the annual season of Ukraine's football knockout competition for amateur football teams.

== Competition schedule ==
=== First qualification round ===
Team 1	Score	Team 2
FC Lokomotyv Smila	2–0	FC Bilshovyk Kyiv
FC Voskhod Kyiv	3–2	FC Avanhard Novohrad-Volynskyi
FC Sluch Berezne	2–0	FC Bukovyna Chernivtsi (reserves)
FC Khimik Kalush	2–0	FC Sluch Krasyliv
FC Vodnyk Mykolaiv	3–1	FC Shakhtar Oleksandriya
FC Enerhiya Nova Kakhovka	2–1	FC Khvylia Sevastopol
FC Mayak Kharkiv	2–0	FC Suputnyk Poltava
FC Hvardiyets Odesa	(3–0)	FC Metalist Sevastopol
FC Zirka Lviv	6–2	FC Fermmash Rozhyshche
FC Strila Zaporizhia	4–0	FC Monolit Donetsk

Notes:

- The match Hvardiyets – Metalist was awarded 3–0 as a technical result.

=== Second qualification round ===
Team 1	Score	Team 2
FC Vodnyk Mykolaiv	1–0	FC Strila Zaporizhia
FC Kolos Novo Davydkovo	1–0	FC Khimik Kalush
FC Mayak Kharkiv	5–0	FC Frunzenets Sumy
FC Hvardiyets Odesa	1–1	FC Enerhiya Nova Kakhovka
FC Lokomotyv Smila	7–2	FC Avanhard Ladan
FC Sokil Lviv	1–1	FC Voskhod Kyiv
FC Sluch Berezne	0–2	FC Zirka Lviv

Replay

Team 1	Score	Team 2
FC Sokil Lviv	0–1	FC Voskhod Kyiv
FC Hvardiyets Odesa	2–0	FC Enerhiya Nova Kakhovka

=== Quarterfinals (1/4) ===
Team 1	Score	Team 2
FC Kolos Novo Davydkovo	1–4	FC Zirka Lviv
FC Voskhod Kyiv	2–3	FC Lokomotyv Smila
FC Vodnyk Mykolaiv	1–2	FC Hvardiyets Odesa
FC Mayak Kharkiv	0–5	FC Vikhr Dnipropetrovsk

=== Semifinals (1/2) ===
Team 1	Score	Team 2
FC Vikhr Dnipropetrovsk	0–0	FC Hvadiyets Odesa
FC Zirka Lviv	1–2	FC Lokomotyv Smila

=== Final ===
November 23

Team 1	Score	Team 2
FC Lokomotyv Smila	0–0	FC Vikhr Dnipropetrovsk

Replay (November 24)

Team 1	Score	Team 2
FC Lokomotyv Smila	1–1 (7–6 p)	FC Vikhr Dnipropetrovsk

== See also ==
- 1975 KFK competitions (Ukraine)
