= 1976 Football Cup of Ukrainian SSR among KFK =

Football tournament season

1976 Ukrainian Amateur Cup
Tournament details
- Country: Soviet Union (Ukrainian SSR)

Final positions
- Champions: FC Elektron Ivano-Frankivsk
- Runners-up: FC Tytan Armyansk

The 1976 Football Cup of Ukrainian SSR among KFK was the annual season of Ukraine's football knockout competition for amateur football teams.

== Competition schedule ==
=== First qualification round ===
Team 1	Score	Team 2
FC Avanhard Volodarsk	2–4	FC Monolit Donetsk
FC Vikhr Dnipropetrovsk	(3–0)	FC Komunarets Komunarsk
FC Prohres Berdychiv	0–1	FC DVRZ Kyiv
FC Radyst Kirovohrad	1–0	FC Khvylia Mykolaiv
FC Tytan Armyansk	8–3	FC Kolos Tatarbunary
FC Bilshovyk Kyiv	2–1	FC Lokomotyv Smila
FC Avanhard Dzhankoy	(3–0)	FC Kolos Skadovsk
FC Suputnyk Poltava	0–1	FC Budivelnyk Zolochiv
FC Silmash Kovel	0–4	SKA Lviv
FC Metalurh Starokostiantyniv	1–2	FC Elektron Ivano-Frankivsk
FC Khimik Sloviansk	0–1	FC Start Zaporizhia
FC Kolos Borodinka	1–1	FC Khimik Chernihiv
FC Kolos Novo Davydkovo	3–2	FC Burevisnyk Ternopil
FC Kolhospnyk Storozhnytsia	2–0	FC Vodnyk Rivne
FC Avanhard Merefa	2–1	FC Svema Shostka
FC Sokil Lviv	2–0	FC Avanhard Vinnytsia

Replay

Team 1	Score	Team 2
FC Kolos Borodianka	2–1	FC Khimik Chernihiv

Notes:

- The match Avanhard – Kolos was awarded 3–0 as a technical result.
- The match Vikhr – Komunarets was awarded 3–0 as a technical result.

=== Second qualification round ===
Team 1	Score	Team 2
FC Start Zaporizhia	(3–0)	FC Radyst Kirovohrad
FC Budivelnyk Zolochiv	0–1	FC Avanhard Merefa
FC Kolos Borodianka	2–3	FC Bilshovyk Kyiv
FC Monolit Donetsk	1–2	FC Vikhr Dnipropetrovsk
FC Elektron Ivano-Frankivsk	2–1	FC Kolos Novo Davydkovo
FC Avanhard Dzankoy	0–7	FC Tytan Armyansk
SKA Lviv	1–0	FC Kolhospnyk Storozhnytsia
FC DVRZ Kyiv	0–0	FC Sokil Lviv

Replay

Team 1	Score	Team 2
FC DVRZ Kyiv	0–2	FC Sokil Lviv

Notes:

- The match Start – Radyst was awarded 3–0 as a technical result.

=== Quarterfinals (1/4) ===
Team 1	Score	Team 2
FC Avanhard Merefa	1–2	FC Vikhr Dnipropetrovsk
FC Elektron Ivano-Frankivsk	2–0	SKA Lviv
FC Bilshovyk Kyiv	2–2	FC Sokil Lviv
FC Tytan Armyansk	1–0	FC Start Zaporizhia

Replay

Team 1	Score	Team 2
FC Bilshovyk Kyiv	2–1	FC Sokil Lviv

=== Semifinals (1/2) ===
Team 1	Score	Team 2
FC Elektron Ivano-Frankivsk	2–1	FC Bilshovyk Kyiv
FC Vikhr Dnipropetrovsk	1–1	FC Tytan Armyansk

Replay

Team 1	Score	Team 2
FC Vikhr Dnipropetrovsk	0–1	FC Tytan Armyansk

=== Final ===
November 6

Team 1	Score	Team 2
FC Elektron Ivano-Frankivsk	2–1	FC Tytan Armyansk

== See also ==
- 1976 KFK competitions (Ukraine)
