= 1977 Football Cup of Ukrainian SSR among KFK =

1977 Ukrainian Amateur Cup
Tournament details
- Country: Soviet Union (Ukrainian SSR)

Final positions
- Champions: FC Tytan Armyansk
- Runners-up: FC Elektron Ivano-Frankivsk

The 1976 Football Cup of Ukrainian SSR among KFK was the annual season of Ukraine's football knockout competition for amateur football teams.

== Competition schedule ==
=== First qualification round ===
Team 1	Score	Team 2
FC Kolos Pavlohrad	4–1	FC Azovets Berdiansk
FC Prylad Lutsk	0–3	FC Elektron Ivano-Frankivsk
FC Elektron Zbarazh	3–3	FC Sluch Krasyliv
FC Promin Chernihiv	(3–0)	FC Frunzenets Sumy
FC Sokil Lviv	2–1	FC Chervonyi Ekskavator Kyiv
FC Avanhard Dzhankoy	3–2	FC ZOR Odesa
FC Shakhtobudivnyk Donetsk	1–0	FC Suputnyk Poltava
FC Kirovets Makiivka	1–0	FC Khimik Rubizhne
FC Shakhtar Lutuhine	2–1	FC Budivelnyk Zolochiv
FC Bilshovyk Kyiv	2–0	FC Lokomotyv Koziatyn
FC Radyst Kirovohrad	2–0	FC Komunarovets Mykolaiv
FC Enerhiya Nova Kakhovka	0–1	FC Tytan Armyansk
FC Mayak Kharkiv	1–0	FC Fotoprylad Cherkasy
FC Vodnyk Rivne	3–1	LVVPU Lviv
FC Khimik Velykyi Bychkiv	2–1	FC Cheremosh Vyzhnytsia

Replay

Team 1	Score	Team 2
FC Elektron Zbarazh	1–2	FC Sluch Krasyliv

Notes:

- The match Promin – Frunzenets was awarded 3–0 as a technical result.

=== Second qualification round ===
Team 1	Score	Team 2
FC Kolos Pavlohrad	2–0	FC Shakhtar Lutuhine
FC Sluch Krasyliv	2–0	FC Khimik Velykyi Bychkiv
FC Elektrovymiriuvach Zhytomyr	1–2	FC Tytan Armyansk
FC Radyst Kirovohrad	0–1	FC Shakhtobudivnyk Donetsk
FC Tytan Armyansk	(3–0)	FC Avanhard Dzankoy
FC Kirovets Makiivka	1–1 (4–3 p)	FC Mayak Kharkiv
FC Elektron Ivano-Frankivsk	2–1	FC Vodnyk Rivne
FC Promin Chernihiv	0–3	FC Sokil Lviv

Notes:

- The match Tytan – Avanhard was awarded 3–0 as a technical result.
- In the match Elektrovymiriuvach – Tytan possible has to be Bilshovyk instead of Tytan.

=== Quarterfinals (1/4) ===
Team 1	Score	Team 2
FC Sluch Krasyliv	1–2	FC Elektron Ivano-Frankivsk
FC Kirovets Makiivka	1–0	FC Kolos Pavlohrad
FC Bilshovyk Kyiv	1–0	FC Sokil Lviv
FC Tytan Armyansk	4–1	FC Shakhtobudivnyk Donetsk

=== Semifinals (1/2) ===
Team 1	Score	Team 2
FC Elektron Ivano-Frankivsk	3–2	FC Bilshovyk Kyiv
FC Tytan Armyansk	4–0	FC Kirovets Makiivka

=== Final ===
November 12

Team 1	Score	Team 2
FC Tytan Armyansk	1–0	FC Elektron Ivano-Frankivsk

== See also ==
- 1977 KFK competitions (Ukraine)
