= 1978 Football Cup of Ukrainian SSR among KFK =

1978 Ukrainian Amateur Cup
Tournament details
- Country: Soviet Union (Ukrainian SSR)

Final positions
- Champions: FC Bilshovyk Kyiv
- Runners-up: FC Mayak Kharkiv

The 1978 Football Cup of Ukrainian SSR among KFK was the annual season of Ukraine's football knockout competition for amateur football teams.

== Competition schedule ==
=== First qualification round ===
| Team 1 | Score | Team 2 |
|---|---|---|
| FC Bilshovyk Kyiv | 2–0 | FC Promin Chernihiv |
| FC Mayak Kharkiv | 5–1 | FC Suputnyk Stepanivka |
| FC Sokil Lviv | 1–0 | FC Kolos Kitsman |
| FC Enerhiya Nova Kakhovka | 3–1 | FC Shtorm Odesa |
| FC Arsenal Kyiv | 1–0 | FC Intehral Vinnytsia |
| FC Transformator Zaporizhia | 3–0 | FC Tytan Vilnohirsk |
| FC Nyva Pidhaitsi | 4–2 | FC Silmash Kovel |
| FC Shakhtar Stakhanov | 3–0 | FC Khimik Horlivka |
| FC Krystal Yahotyn | 1–0 | FC Khimik Cherkasy |
| FC Avanhard Lozova | 6–1 | FC Zorya Poltava |
| FC Keramik Mukachevo | 2–1 | FC Torpedo Drohobych |
| FC Radyst Kirovohrad | +/- | FC Burevisnyk Simferopol |
| FC Torpedo Rivne | 3–2 | FC Torpedo Zhytomyr |
| FC Zarevo Makiivka | 4–0 | FC Shakhtar Lysychansk |
| FC Elektron Ivano-Frankivsk | 9–0 | FC Metalist Starokostiantyniv |
| FC Tytan Armyansk | 2–1 | FC Sudnobudivnyk Mykolaiv |

=== Second qualification round ===
| Team 1 | Score | Team 2 |
|---|---|---|
| FC Bilshovyk Kyiv | 4–0 | FC Krystal Yahotyn |
| FC Mayak Kharkiv | 2–1 | FC Avanhard Lozova |
| FC Sokil Lviv | 3–1 | FC Keramik Mukachevo |
| FC Enerhiya Nova Kakhovka | 4–0 | FC Radyst Kirovohrad |
| FC Arsenal Kyiv | 2–0 | FC Torpedo Rivne |
| FC Transformator Zaporizhia | 1–0 | FC Zarevo Makiivka |
| FC Nyva Pidhaitsi | 1–0 | FC Elektron Ivano-Frankivsk |
| FC Shakhtar Stakhanov | 4–0 | FC Tytan Armyansk |

=== Quarterfinals (1/4) ===
| Team 1 | Score | Team 2 |
|---|---|---|
| FC Bilshovyk Kyiv | 1–0 | FC Arsenal Kyiv |
| FC Mayak Kharkiv | 1–0 | FC Transformator Zaporizhia |
| FC Sokil Lviv | 2–0 | FC Nyva Pidhaitsi |
| FC Enerhiya Nova Kakhovka | 5–0 | FC Shakhtar Stakhanov |

=== Semifinals (1/2) ===
| Team 1 | Score | Team 2 |
|---|---|---|
| FC Bilshovyk Kyiv | 2–0 | FC Sokil Lviv |
| FC Mayak Kharkiv | 1–0 | FC Enerhiya Nova Kakhovka |

=== Final ===
| Team 1 | Score | Team 2 |
|---|---|---|
| FC Bilshovyk Kyiv | 2–0 | FC Mayak Kharkiv |

== See also ==
- 1978 KFK competitions (Ukraine)
