= 1966 Football Cup of Ukrainian SSR among KFK =

1966 Ukrainian Amateur Cup
Tournament details
- Country: Soviet Union (Ukrainian SSR)

Final positions
- Champions: LVVPU Lviv
- Runners-up: FC Suputnyk Poltava

The 1966 Football Cup of Ukrainian SSR among KFK was the annual season of Ukraine's football knockout competition for amateur football teams.

== Competition schedule ==
=== Preliminary round ===
Team 1	Score	Team 2
FC Mashynobudivnyk Chernivtsi	3–2	FC Tytan Zaporizhia
FC Lokomotyv Kovel	3–2	FC Tekstylnyk Rivno
FC Elektrovymiryuvach Zytomyr	3–0	FC Enerhiya Khmelnytskyi
FC Spartak Tulchyn	2–0	FC Lokomotyv Kolomyia
FC Avanhard KremHES	1–2	FC Temp Bila Tserkva
FC Khimik Chernihiv	3–2	FC Torpedo Sumy
FC Shakhtar Vatutine	1–0	FC Khimik Krasnyi Luch

=== First qualification round ===
Team 1	Score	Team 2
FC Pryladyst Mukachevo	4–2	FC Lokomotyv Kovel
FC Elektrovymiryuvach Zhytomyr	+/-	FC Vosstaniye Tatarbunary
FC Spartak Tulchyn	1–3	FC Bilshovyk Kyiv
FC Temp Bila Tserkva	1–2	FC Shakhtar Budyonivka
FC Khimik Chernihiv	3–2	FC Avanhard Dnipropetrovsk
FC Shakhtar Vatutine	x–x	?
FC Promin Bohodukhiv	x–x	?
FC Suputnyk Poltava	x–x	?
LVVPU Lviv	x–x	?FC Mashynobudivnyk Chernivtsi
FC Metalist Sevastopol	x–x	?

=== Second qualification round ===
Team 1	Score	Team 2
FC Bilshovyk Kyiv	0–0	FC Elektrovymiryuvach Zhytomyr
FC Shakhtar Budyonivka	1–0	FC Shakhtar Vatutine
FC Suputnyk Poltava	2–1	FC Promin Bohodukhiv
FC Pryladyst Mukachevo?	x–x	LVVPU Lviv
FC Metalist Sevastopol	x–x	?FC Khimik Chernihiv

Replay

Team 1	Score	Team 2
FC Bilshovyk Kyiv	3–0	FC Elektrovymiryuvach Zhytomyr

=== Quarterfinals (1/4) ===
Team 1	Score	Team 2
FC Suputnyk Poltava	1–1	FC Shakhtar Budyonivka

Replay

Team 1	Score	Team 2
FC Suputnyk Poltava	4–3	FC Shakhtar Budyonivka

=== Semifinals (1/2) ===
Team 1	Score	Team 2
FC Bilshovyk Kyiv	x–x	LVVPU Lviv
FC Suputnyk Poltava	x–x	FC Metalist Sevastopol

=== Final ===
Team 1	Score	Team 2
LVVPU Lviv	2–0	FC Suputnyk Poltava

== See also ==
- 1966 KFK competitions (Ukraine)
