= 1962 Football Cup of Ukrainian SSR among KFK =

1962 Ukrainian Amateur Cup
Tournament details
- Country: Soviet Union (Ukrainian SSR)

Final positions
- Champions: FC Avanhard Dnipropetrovsk
- Runners-up: FC Ekran Shostka

The 1962 Football Cup of Ukrainian SSR among KFK was the annual season of Ukraine's football knockout competition for amateur football teams.

== Competition schedule ==
=== Preliminary round ===
Team 1	Score	Team 2
FC Kolhospnyk Berehovo Raion	6–0	FC Spartak Khmelnyk
FC Avanhard Mykolaiv	2–1	FC Shakhtar Dmytrovo
FC Zirka Chernihiv	0–8	FC Start Chuhuiv
FC Zirka Shepetivka	2–10	FC Temp Kyiv
FC Spartak Rivno	1–2	FC Silmash Lviv
FC YASK Makiivka	4–0	FC Kolkhoz Rossiya Novotroitske Raion

=== First qualification round ===
Team 1	Score	Team 2
FC Kolhospnyk Berezhany	5–2	FC Naftovyk Dolyna
FC Zenit Volodymyr-Volynskyi	4–0	FC Kolhospnyk Berehovo Raion
FC Avanhard Dnipropetrovsk	2–1	FC Dunayets Izmail
FC Hvardiyets Bila Tserkva	3–1	FC Avanhard Mykolaiv
FC Avanhard Kryukiv	0–1	FC Ekran Shostka
FC Start Chuhuiv	2–3	FC Shaktar Vatutine
FC Temp Kyiv	6–1	FC Prohres Berdychiv
FC Silmash Lviv	2–1	FC Mashynobudivnyk Chernivtsi
FC Burevisnyk Melitopol	3–1	FC YASK Makiivka
FC Metalurh-ZRK Kerch	5–4	FC Metalurh Komunarsk

=== Second qualification round ===
Team 1	Score	Team 2
FC Kolhospnyk Berezhany	1–0	FC Zenit Volodymyr-Volynskyi
FC Avanhard Dnipropetrovsk	3–0	FC Hvardiyets Bila Tserkva
FC Shakhtar Vatutine	1–3	FC Ekran Shostka
FC Silmash Lviv	1–2	FC Temp Kyiv
FC Burevisnyk Melitopol	2–0	FC Metalurh-ZRK Kerch

=== Quarterfinals (1/4) ===
Team 1	Score	Team 2
FC Ekran Shostka	2–0	FC Temp Kyiv

=== Semifinals (1/2) ===
Team 1	Score	Team 2
FC Kolhospnyk Berezhany	2–4	FC Avanhard Dnipropetrovsk
FC Ekran Shostka	1–0	FC Burevisnyk Melitopol

=== Final ===
Team 1	Score	Team 2
FC Avanhard Dnipropetrovsk	2–0	FC Ekran Shostka
