= 1986 KFK competitions (Ukraine) =

KFK competitions
- Season: 1986
- Champions: Vorskla Poltava

The 1986 KFK competitions in Ukraine were part of the 1986 Soviet KFK competitions that were conducted in the Soviet Union. It was 22nd season of the KFK in Ukraine since its introduction in 1964. The winner eventually qualified to the 1987 Soviet Second League.

== First stage ==
=== Group 1 ===
Pos	Team	Pld	W	D	L	GF	GA	GD	Pts
1	Nyva Berezhany	16	10	3	3	23	11	+12	23
2	Silmash Kolomyia	16	9	5	2	24	9	+15	23
3	Zirka Zhytomyr	16	9	4	3	32	13	+19	22
4	Tsukrovyk Chortkiv	16	8	3	5	12	12	0	19
5	Keramik Mukachevo	16	5	2	9	16	26	−10	12
6	Burevisnyk Kamianets-Podilskyi	16	5	2	9	13	18	−5	12
7	Kolos Serebria	16	5	2	9	15	28	−13	12
8	Kolos Zastavne	16	4	4	8	25	30	−5	12
9	Lehmash Chernivtsi	16	2	5	9	17	30	−13	9

Source: ukr-football.org.ua

=== Group 2 ===
Pos	Team	Pld	W	D	L	GF	GA	GD	Pts
1	Spartak Sambir	16	10	4	2	24	9	+15	24
2	Prohres Berdychiv	16	10	2	4	31	21	+10	22
3	Sokil Haisyn	16	9	3	4	21	15	+6	21
4	Pidshypnyk Lutsk	16	9	3	4	30	21	+9	21
5	Naftovyk Dolyna	16	9	3	4	41	22	+19	21
6	Izotop Kuznetsovsk	16	4	5	7	16	24	−8	13
7	LVVPU Lviv	16	3	6	7	23	27	−4	12
8	Dnister Zalishchyky	16	1	3	12	16	40	−24	5
9	Elektron Ivano-Frankivsk	16	1	3	12	11	34	−23	5

Source: ukr-football.org.ua

=== Group 3 ===
Pos	Team	Pld	W	D	L	GF	GA	GD	Pts
1	Vorskla Poltava	16	13	1	2	45	13	+32	27
2	Yavir Krasnopillia	16	9	3	4	23	23	0	21
3	Mashynobudivnyk Borodianka	16	8	4	4	33	16	+17	20
4	Frunzenets Sumy	16	8	2	6	26	26	0	18
5	Paperovyk Malyn	16	7	4	5	23	15	+8	18
6	Voskhod Kyiv	16	6	2	8	24	21	+3	14
7	Metalist Kyiv	16	4	3	9	21	46	−25	11
8	Dnipro Cherkasy	16	3	3	10	14	30	−16	9
9	Kolos Heronymivka	16	2	2	12	9	28	−19	6

Source: ukr-football.org.ua

=== Group 4 ===
Pos	Team	Pld	W	D	L	GF	GA	GD	Pts
1	Shakhtar Dzerzhynsk	14	10	2	2	26	10	+16	22
2	Avanhard Ordzhonikidze	14	10	1	3	31	14	+17	21
3	Kremin Kremenchuk	14	7	4	3	23	11	+12	18
4	Avanhard Lozova	14	5	4	5	19	21	−2	14
5	Radyst Kirovohrad	14	5	2	7	16	26	−10	12
6	Bazhanovets Makiivka	14	3	4	7	16	23	−7	10
7	Lokomotyv Znamianka	14	3	2	9	12	25	−13	8
8	Radyst Dniprodzerzhynsk	14	2	3	9	18	31	−13	7

Source: ukr-football.org.ua

=== Group 5 ===
Pos	Team	Pld	W	D	L	GF	GA	GD	Pts
1	Enerhiya Nova Kakhovka	16	12	2	2	33	14	+19	26
2	Tytan Armiansk	16	10	3	3	43	18	+25	23
3	Krystal Zaporizhia	16	7	5	4	18	16	+2	19
4	Vodnyk Mykolaiv	16	6	4	6	19	26	−7	16
5	Frehat Pervomaisk	16	5	4	7	25	24	+1	14
6	Kolos Osokorivka	16	5	4	7	19	23	−4	14
7	Dynamo Odesa	16	3	7	6	21	21	0	13
8	Portovyk Izmail	16	3	4	9	18	31	−13	10
9	Torpedo Melitopol	16	2	5	9	15	38	−23	9

Source: ukr-football.org.ua

=== Group 6 ===
Pos	Team	Pld	W	D	L	GF	GA	GD	Pts
1	Metalurh Kupiansk	14	9	3	2	21	11	+10	21
2	Komunarets Komunarsk	14	9	2	3	31	15	+16	20
3	Shakhtar Sverdlovsk	14	8	1	5	20	14	+6	17
4	Shakhtar Donetsk	14	5	4	5	16	15	+1	14
5	Tsvetmet Artemivsk	14	6	1	7	11	15	−4	13
6	Sokil Rovenky	14	5	1	8	18	19	−1	11
7	Tsementnyk Balaklia	14	4	1	9	12	21	−9	9
8	Udarnyk Snizhne	14	2	3	9	15	23	−8	7

Source: ukr-football.org.ua

== Final ==
The finals took place in Mukacheve, Zakarpattia Oblast.

Pos	Team	Pld	W	D	L	GF	GA	GD	Pts	Promotion
1	Vorskla Poltava	5	4	1	0	11	1	+10	9	Promoted to Second League
2	Metalurh Kupiansk	5	2	3	0	6	2	+4	7	
3	Spartak Sambir	5	2	2	1	4	3	+1	6	
4	Nyva Berezhany	5	2	0	3	5	8	−3	4	
5	Enerhiya Nova Kakhovka	5	1	2	2	5	7	−2	4	
6	Shakhtar Dzerzhynsk	5	0	0	5	0	10	−10	0	

Source: ukr-football.org.ua
