= 1971 Football Cup of Ukrainian SSR among KFK =

1971 Ukrainian Amateur Cup
Tournament details
- Country: Soviet Union (Ukrainian SSR)

Final positions
- Champions: FC Tsvetmet Artemivsk
- Runners-up: FC ZKL Dnipropetrovsk

The 1971 Football Cup of Ukrainian SSR among KFK was the annual season of Ukraine's football knockout competition for amateur football teams.

== Competition schedule ==
=== Preliminary round ===
Team 1	Score	Team 2
FC Torpedo Rivne	0–1	FC Prohres Berdychiv
FC Avanhard Vatutine	1–0	FC Khimik Vinnytsia
FC Spartak Pervomaisk	3–0	FC Metalist Sevastopol
FC ZKL Dnipropetrovsk	2–0	FC Avanhard Svitlovodsk
FC Enerhiya Nova Kakhovka	1–2	FC Avanhard Simferopol (reserves)
FC Kolos Borodianka	3–1	FC Sluch Krasyliv
FC Svema Shostka	1–0	FC Lokomotyv Poltava

=== First qualification round ===
August 19

Team 1	Score	Team 2
FC Bilshovyk Kyiv	5–0	FC Avanhard Vatutine
FC Khimik Chernihiv	0–3	FC Mayak Kharkiv
FC Spartak Kovel	1–2	FC Zbruch Pidvolochysk
FC Shakhtar Dniprorudne	8–0	FC Svema Shostka
FC Khimik Novyi Rozdol	2–1	FC Kolos Borodianka
DOK Chernivtsi	3–2	FC Khimik Kalush
FC Avanhard Simferopol (reserves)	w/o	FC Vosstanie Tatarbunary
FC Tsvetmet Artemivsk	4–2	FC Spartak Pervomaisk
FC Prohres Berdychiv	3–2	FC Mebelnyk Berehove
FC Shakhtar Sverdlovsk	1–2	FC ZKL Dnipropetrovsk

=== Second qualification round ===
Team 1	Score	Team 2
FC ZKL Dnipropetrovsk	1–0	FC Shakhtar Dniprorudne
FC Mayak Kharkiv	0–1	FC Bilshovyk Kyiv
FC Prohres Berdychiv	2–0	DOK Chernivtsi
FC Khimik Novyi Rozdol	w/o	FC Zbruch Pidvolochysk
FC Avanhard Simferopol (reserves)	1–2	FC Tsvetmet Artemivsk

=== Quarterfinals (1/4) ===
Team 1	Score	Team 2
FC Khimik Novyi Rozdol	1–0	FC Prohres Berdychiv

=== Semifinals (1/2) ===
Team 1	Score	Team 2
FC Tsvetmet Artemivsk	1–0	FC Khimik Novyi Rozdol
FC Bilshovyk Kyiv	1–2	FC ZKL Dnipropetrovsk

=== Final ===
October 31

Team 1	Score	Team 2
FC Tsvetmet Artemivsk	2–0	FC ZKL Dnipropetrovsk

== See also ==
- 1971 KFK competitions (Ukraine)
