= 1969 Football Cup of Ukrainian SSR among KFK =

1969 Ukrainian Amateur Cup
Tournament details
- Country: Soviet Union (Ukrainian SSR)

Final positions
- Champions: Shakhtar Makiivka
- Runners-up: FC Sokil Lviv

The 1969 Football Cup of Ukrainian SSR among KFK was the annual season of Ukraine's football knockout competition for amateur football teams.

== Competition schedule ==
=== Preliminary round ===
| Team 1 | Score | Team 2 |
|---|---|---|
| FC Horyn Izyaslav | 2–1 | FC Kholodylnyk Vasylkiv |
| ? | x–x | ? |
| ? | x–x | ? |
| ? | x–x | ? |
| ? | x–x | ? |
| ? | x–x | ? |

=== First qualification round ===
| Team 1 | Score | Team 2 |
|---|---|---|
| FC Khimik Kalush | 2–1 | FC Mayak Berezhany |
| FC Mebelnyk Berehovo | 6–4 | FC Avanhard Korosten |
| FC Zirka Poltava | 2–0 | FC Lokomotyv Smila |
| FC Avanhard Kryvyi Rih | x–x | FC Horyn Izyaslav |
| FC Shakhtar Krasnodon | 2–1 | FC Khimik Chernihiv |
| Shakhtar Makiivka | 1–0 | FC Start Chuhuiv |
| FC Temp Kyiv | x–x | ? |
| FC Sokil Lviv | x–x | ? |
| FC Tytan Zaporizhia | x–x | ? |
| ? | x–x | ? |

=== Second qualification round ===
| Team 1 | Score | Team 2 |
|---|---|---|
| FC Zirka Poltava | 2–0 | FC Temp Kyiv |
| FC Mebelnyk Berehovo | 2–1 | FC Avanhard Kryvyi Rih |
| Shakhtar Makiivka | 2–0 | FC Shakhtar Krasnodon |
| FC Tytan Zaporizhia | x–x | ? |
| FC Sokil Lviv | x–x | ?FC Khimik Kalush |

=== Quarterfinals (1/4) ===
| Team 1 | Score | Team 2 |
|---|---|---|
| FC Zirka Poltava | 3–2 | FC Mebelnyk Berehovo |

=== Semifinals (1/2) ===
| Team 1 | Score | Team 2 |
|---|---|---|
| Shakhtar Makiivka | 1–0 | FC Tytan Zaporizhia |
| FC Sokil Lviv | 4–2 | FC Zirka Poltava |

=== Final ===
| Team 1 | Score | Team 2 |
|---|---|---|
| Shakhtar Makiivka | 1–0 | FC Sokil Lviv |

== See also ==
- 1969 KFK competitions (Ukraine)
