= 1963 Football Cup of Ukrainian SSR among KFK =

1963 Ukrainian Amateur Cup
Tournament details
- Country: Soviet Union (Ukrainian SSR)

Final positions
- Champions: FC Meteor Dnipropetrovsk
- Runners-up: FC Torpedo Mykolaiv

The 1963 Football Cup of Ukrainian SSR among KFK was the annual season of Ukraine's football knockout competition for amateur football teams.

== Competition schedule ==
=== Preliminary round ===
Team 1	Score	Team 2
FC Temp Bila Tserkva	5–0	FC Avanhard Smila
FC Hvardiya Romny	4–2	FC Zirka Chernihiv
FC Lokomotyv Haivoron	3–3	FC Avanhard Kryukiv
FC Zenit Volodymyr-Volynskyi	3–0	FC Burevisnyk-IIVKh Rivno
FC Strila Zaporizhia	1–2	FC Avanhard Sevastopol
FC Khimik Kalush	3–0	FC Blyskavka Chernivtsi

Replay

Team 1	Score	Team 2
FC Lokomtyv Haivoron	3–1	FC Avanhard Kryukiv

=== First qualification round ===
Team 1	Score	Team 2
FC Meteor Dnipropetrovsk	5–0	FC Temp Bila Tserkva
FC Vostok Mohyliv-Podilskyi	0–1	FC Motor Novohrad-Volynskyi
FC Start Chuhuiv	2–1	FC Hvardiya Romny
FC Avanhard Rovenky	2–1	FC Lokomotyv Haivoron
FC Bilshovyk Kyiv	1–1	FC Zenit Volodymyr-Volynskyi
FC Kolhospnyk Berezhany	0–0	FC Podillia Kamianets-Podilskyi
FC Avanhard Kherson	0–3	FC Torpedo Mykolaiv
FC Avanhard Sevastopol	3–0	FC Enerhiya Slovyansk
FC Mukachevprylad Mukachevo	3–1	FC Zirka Yavoriv
FC Taksomotornyi Park Odesa	3–1	FC Khimik Kalush

Replay

Team 1	Score	Team 2
FC Bilshovyk Kyiv	2–0	FC Zenit Volodymyr-Volynskyi
FC Kolhospnyk Berezhany	3–1	FC Podillia Kamianets-Podilskyi

=== Second qualification round ===
Team 1	Score	Team 2
FC Motor Novohrad-Volynskyi	0–1	FC Meteor Dnipropetrovsk
FC Start Chuhuiv	3–1	FC Avanhard Rovenky
FC Bilshovyk Kyiv	1–0	FC Kolhospnyk Berezhany
FC Torpedo Mykolaiv	2–1	FC Avanhard Sevastopol
FC Mukachevprylad Mukachevo	2–4	FC Taksomotornyi Park Odesa

=== Quarterfinals (1/4) ===
Team 1	Score	Team 2
FC Start Chuhuiv	1–0	FC Bilshovyk Kyiv

=== Semifinals (1/2) ===
Team 1	Score	Team 2
FC Meteor Dnipropetrovsk	4–1	FC Start Chuhuiv
FC Torpedo Mykolaiv	3–1	FC Taksomotornyi Park Odesa

=== Final ===
Team 1	Score	Team 2
FC Torpedo Mykolaiv	1–2 (a.e.t.)	FC Meteor Dnipropetrovsk
