= 1968 Football Cup of Ukrainian SSR among KFK =

1968 Ukrainian Amateur Cup
Tournament details
- Country: Soviet Union (Ukrainian SSR)

Final positions
- Champions: LVVPU Lviv
- Runners-up: FC Zorya Artemivsk

The 1968 Football Cup of Ukrainian SSR among KFK was the annual season of Ukraine's football knockout competition for amateur football teams.

== Competition schedule ==
=== Preliminary round ===
Team 1	Score	Team 2
FC Plasmasovyk Vynohradiv	2–0	FC Voskhod Chernivtsi
FC Spartak Bila Tserkva	1–2	FC Avanhard Ladan
?	x–x	?
?	x–x	?
?	x–x	?
?	x–x	?

=== First qualification round ===
Team 1	Score	Team 2
FC Avanhard Malyn	0–2	FC Plasmasovyk Vynohradiv
FC Avanhard Ladan	4–2	FC Avanhard Krasnodon
FC Donets Izyum	2–0	FC Ekran Shostka
FC Avanhard Vilnohirsk	x–x	?
FC Zorya Artemivsk	x–x	?
FC Avanhard Melitopol	x–x	?
FC Bilshovyk Kyiv	x–x	?
LVVPU Lviv	x–x	?
?	x–x	?
?	x–x	?

=== Second qualification round ===
Team 1	Score	Team 2
FC Plasmasovyk Vynohradiv	x–x	FC Avanhard Vilnohirsk
FC Avanhard Ladan	0–1	FC Donets Izyum
FC Zorya Artemivsk	2–1	FC Avanhard Melitopol
FC Bilshovyk Kyiv	x–x	?
LVVPU Lviv	x–x	?

=== Quarterfinals (1/4) ===
Team 1	Score	Team 2
FC Donets Izyum	1–0	FC Bilshovyk Kyiv

=== Semifinals (1/2) ===
Team 1	Score	Team 2
LVVPU Lviv	1–0	FC Donets Izyum
FC Zorya Artemivsk	3–1	FC Avanhard Vilnohirsk

=== Final ===
Team 1	Score	Team 2
LVVPU Lviv	3–0	FC Zorya Artemivsk

== See also ==
- 1968 KFK competitions (Ukraine)
