= 1967 Football Cup of Ukrainian SSR among KFK =

1967 Ukrainian Amateur Cup
Tournament details
- Country: Soviet Union (Ukrainian SSR)

Final positions
- Champions: FC Bilshovyk Kyiv
- Runners-up: FC Avanhard Vilnohirsk

The 1967 Football Cup of Ukrainian SSR among KFK was the annual season of Ukraine's football knockout competition for amateur football teams.

== Competition schedule ==
=== Preliminary round ===
| Team 1 | Score | Team 2 |
|---|---|---|
| FC Zbruch Pidvolochysk | 2–1 | FC Plasmasovyk Vynohradiv |
| FC Zirka Zhytomyr | 2–1 | FC Pedinstytut Vinnytsia |
| FC Avtomobilist Ivano-Frankivsk | 5–1 | FC Voskhod Chernivtsi |
| FC Kolos Tatarbunary | 1–2 | FC Zenit Mykolaiv |
| FC Khimik Chernihiv | 2–1 | FC Spartak Kirovohrad |
| FC Donets Izyum | 5–0 | FC Spartak Uman |

Notes:

- Winner of the match Avtomobilist 5–1 Voskhod was Voskhod, possibly due to some administrative decision or other sanctions

=== First qualification round ===
| Team 1 | Score | Team 2 |
|---|---|---|
| FC Zbruch Pidvolochysk | 0–2 | FC Bilshovyk Kyiv |
| FC Shakhtar Bryanka | 2–0 | FC Zirka Zhytomyr |
| FC Horyn-2 Dubrovytsia | 1–3 | FC Sokil Lviv |
| FC Voskhod Chernivtsi | 3–0 | FC Shakhtar Novovolynsk |
| FC Avanhard Vilnohirsk | 1–0 | FC Zenit Mykolaiv |
| FC Spartak Henichesk | 0–3 | FC Strila Zaporizhia |
| FC Lokomotyv Fastiv | x–x | FC Khimik Chernihiv |
| FC Horlovuhlebud Horlivka | 2–1 | FC Metalist Sevastopol |
| FC Hvardiya Romny | 0–2 | FC Donets Izyum |
| FC Horyn Izyaslav | 1–2 | FC Avanhard Kremenchuk |

Replay

| Team 1 | Score | Team 2 |
|---|---|---|
| FC Lokomotyv Fastiv | 2–3 | FC Khimik Chernihiv |

=== Second qualification round ===
| Team 1 | Score | Team 2 |
|---|---|---|
| FC Bilshovyk Kyiv | 2–1 | FC Shakhtar Bryanka |
| FC Sokil Lviv | 1–0 | FC Voskhod Chernivtsi |
| FC Avanhard Vilnohirsk | 3–2 | FC Strila Zaporizhia |
| FC Khimik Chernihiv | 1–5 | FC Horlovuhlebud Horlivka |
| FC Donets Izyum | 1–0 | FC Avanhard Kremenchuk |

=== Quarterfinals (1/4) ===
| Team 1 | Score | Team 2 |
|---|---|---|
| FC Bilshovyk Kyiv | 2–0 | FC Donets Izyum |

=== Semifinals (1/2) ===
| Team 1 | Score | Team 2 |
|---|---|---|
| FC Sokil Lviv | 0–1 | FC Bilshovyk Kyiv |
| FC Horlovuhlebud Horlivka | x–x | FC Avanhard Vilnohirsk |

=== Final ===
| Team 1 | Score | Team 2 |
|---|---|---|
| FC Bilshovyk Kyiv | 2–1 | FC Avanhard Vilnohirsk |

== See also ==
- 1967 KFK competitions (Ukraine)
