= 1984 Football Cup of Ukrainian SSR among KFK =

1984 Ukrainian Amateur Cup
Tournament details
- Country: Soviet Union (Ukrainian SSR)
- Teams: 18

Final positions
- Champions: FC Torpedo Zaporizhia
- Runners-up: FC Karpaty Dubove

The 1984 Football Cup of Ukrainian SSR among KFK was the annual season of Ukraine's football knockout competition for amateur football teams.

== Competition schedule ==
=== First qualification round ===
Team 1	Score	Team 2
FC Maiak Bohorodchany	4–1	FC Sluch Krasyliv
FC Lehmash Chernivtsi	2–3	FC Spartak Sambir
FC Sokil Radyvyliv	1–2	FC Karpaty Dubove
FC Budzhak Artsyz	2–1	FC Khvylia Mykolaiv
FC Torpedo Zaporizhia	6–0	FC Tiasmyn Smila
FC Hirnyk Pavlohrad	1–0	FC Naftovyk Okhtyrka
FC Torpedo Lutsk (reserves)	1–0	FC Sokil Haisyn
FC Enerhiya Nova Kakhovka	5–1	FC Avanhard Dzhankoy
FC Vatra Ternopil	2–0	FC Silmash Bila Tserkva
FC Shakhtar Donetsk (reserves)	3–0	FC Sokil Rovenky

=== Second qualification round ===
Team 1	Score	Team 2
FC Hirnyk Pavlohrad	2–0	FC Torpedo Lutsk (reserves)
FC Motor Poltava	0–2	FC Mayak Kharkiv
FC Radyst Kirovohrad	7–1	FC Budzhak Artsyz
FC Torpedo Zaporizhia	w/o	FC Vatra Ternopil
FC Karpaty Dubove	0–0 ?	FC Maiak Bohorodchany
FC Voskhod Kyiv	3–0	FC Tekstylnyk Chernihiv
FC Spartak Sambir	5–2	FC Prohres Berdychiv
FC Shakhtar Donetsk (reserves)	4–1	FC Enerhiya Nova Kakhovka

=== Quarterfinals (1/4) ===
Team 1	Score	Team 2
FC Spartak Sambir	1–0	FC Voskhod Kyiv
FC Karpaty Dubove	2–1	FC Hirnyk Pavlohrad
FC Mayak Kharkiv	3–1	FC Radyst Kirovohrad
FC Torpedo Zaporizhia	8–1	FC Shakhtar Donetsk (reserves)

=== Semifinals (1/2) ===
Team 1	Score	Team 2
FC Karpaty Dubove	2–1	FC Spartak Sambir
FC Mayak Kharkiv	0–1	FC Torpedo Zaporizhia

=== Final ===
Team 1	Agg.	Team 2	1st leg	2nd leg
FC Karpaty Dubove	1–5	FC Torpedo Zaporizhia	0–0	1–5

== See also ==
- 1984 KFK competitions (Ukraine)
