= Andriy Ponyedyelnik =

Ukrainian footballer

Personal information
- Full name: Andriy Valeriyovych Ponyedyelnik
- Date of birth: 28 February 1997 (age 29)
- Place of birth: Kamin-Kashyrskyi, Ukraine
- Height: 1.81 m (5 ft 11 in)
- Position: Right winger

Team information
- Current team: Kolos Kovalivka
- Number: 77

Youth career
- 2013: Sluch Berezne
- 2013–2014: BLISP-KDYuSSh Berezne
- 2014: Sluch Berezne

Senior career*
Years	Team	Apps	(Gls)
2014	Sluch Berezne	1	(0)
2015	Sokil Krupets	0	(0)
2015	Burevisnyk Kremenets	1	(0)
2016–2017	Nyva Ternopil	56	(5)
2018	Krystal Chortkiv	11	(1)
2018–2019	Bukovyna Chernivtsi	42	(1)
2020	Kalush	0	(0)
2020–2021	Polissya Zhytomyr	28	(2)
2021–2022	Hirnyk-Sport Horishni Plavni	19	(2)
2022–2025	Kryvbas Kryvyi Rih	78	(5)
2025–	Kolos Kovalivka	30	(0)
- * Club domestic league appearances and goals as of 3 June 2026

Andriy Valeriyovych Ponyedyelnik (Ukrainian: Андрій Валерійович Понєдєльнік; born 28 February 1997) is a Ukrainian professional footballer who plays as a right winger for Ukrainian club Kolos Kovalivka.
