= 1960 Football Cup of Ukrainian SSR among KFK =

1960 Ukrainian Amateur Cup
Tournament details
- Country: Soviet Union (Ukrainian SSR)

Final positions
- Champions: FC Start Chuhuiv
- Runners-up: FC Avanhard Shostka

The 1960 Football Cup of Ukrainian SSR among KFK was the annual season of Ukraine's football knockout competition for amateur football teams.

== Competition schedule ==
=== Preliminary round ===
Team 1	Score	Team 2
FC Avanhard Shostka	3–0	FC Oster
FC Avanhard Kerch (reserves)	0–0	FC Avanhard Kakhovka
FC Spartak Ternopil	2–1	FC Spartak Chernivtsi
FC Shakhtar Oleksandriya	2–1	FC Torpedo Mykolaiv
FC Shakhtar Novovolynsk	4–1	FC Spartak Rivne

Replay

Team 1	Score	Team 2
FC Avanhard Kerch (reserves)	0–2	FC Avanhard Kakhovka

=== First qualification round ===
Team 1	Score	Team 2
FC Metalurh Voroshylovsk	3–0	FC Avanhard Kriukiv
FC Avanhard Kakhovka	3–2	FC Lokomotyv Odesa
FC Avanhard Kamianets-Podilskyi	2–0	FC Avanhard Novohrad-Volynskyi
FC Avanhard Uzhhorod	1–0	FC Zirka Yavoriv
FC Bilshovyk Kyiv	4–0	FC Shakhtar Novovolynsk
FC Khimik Kalush	2–1	FC Spartak Ternopil
FC Spartak Bila Tserkva	2–2	FC Avanhard Shostka
FC Avanhard Yenakieve	(3–0)	FC Garrison Cherkasy
FC Shakhtar Oleksandriya	0–0	FC Start Chuhuiv
FC Metalurh Nikopol	1–0	FC Burevisnyk Melitopol

Replay

Team 1	Score	Team 2
FC Shakhtar Oleksandriya	0–3	FC Start Chuhuiv
FC Spartak Bila Tserkva	2–6	FC Avanhard Shostka

Notes:

- The match Avanhard – Garrison was awarded 3–0 as a technical result.

=== Second qualification round ===
Team 1	Score	Team 2
FC Start Chuhuiv	2–1	FC Metalurh Voroshylovsk
FC Avanhard Shostka	2–0	FC Avanhard Yenakieve
FC Bilshovyk Kyiv	3–2	FC Avanhard Kamianets-Podilskyi
FC Khimik Kalush	2–2	FC Avanhard Uzhhorod
FC Metalurh Nikopol	7–0	FC Avanhard Kakhovka

Replay

Team 1	Score	Team 2
FC Khimik Kalush	5–1	FC Avanhard Uzhhorod

=== Quarterfinals (1/4) ===
Team 1	Score	Team 2
FC Bilshovyk Kyiv	5–1	FC Khimik Kalush

=== Semifinals (1/2) ===
Team 1	Score	Team 2
FC Start Chuhuiv	2–1	FC Metalurh Nikopol
FC Bilshovyk Kyiv	0–1	FC Avanhard Shostka

=== Final ===
September 3

Team 1	Score	Team 2
FC Start Chuhuiv	0–0	FC Avanhard Shostka

Replay

Team 1	Score	Team 2
FC Start Chuhuiv	3–1	FC Avanhard Shostka
