= 1961 Football Cup of Ukrainian SSR among KFK =

1961 Ukrainian Amateur Cup
Tournament details
- Country: Soviet Union (Ukrainian SSR)

Final positions
- Champions: FC Start Chuhuiv
- Runners-up: FC Shakhtar Smolianka

The 1961 Football Cup of Ukrainian SSR among KFK was the annual season of Ukraine's football knockout competition for amateur football teams.

== Competition schedule ==
=== Preliminary round ===
Team 1	Score	Team 2
FC Enerhiya Nova Kakhovka	6–0	FC Lokomotyv Odesa
FC Shakhtar Krasnyi Luch	1–4	FC Shakhtar Oleksandriya
FC Khimik Kalush	5–0	FC Avanhard Berehovo
FC Shakhtar Korostyshiv	6–0	FC Spartak Tulchyn
FC Avanhard Kamianets-Podilskyi	2–0	FC Spartak Rivno
FC Avanhard Rivno	1–0	FC Avanhard Smila

=== First qualification round ===
Team 1	Score	Team 2
FC Burevisnyk Melitopol	3–0	FC Avanhard Sevastopol
FC Avanhard Ordzhonikidze	2–1	FC Enerhiya Nova Kakhovka
FC Start Chuhuiv	7–0	FC Zirka Pervomaisk
FC Shakhtar Oleksandriya	3–1	FC Avanhard Kryukiv
FC Khimik Kalush	0–1	FC Avanhard Chernivtsi
FC Shakhtar Sokal	4–0	FC Avanhard Kopychentsi
FC Bilshovyk Kyiv	0–1	FC Shakhtar Korostyshiv
FC Avanhard Kamianets-Podilskyi	8–0	FC Shakhtar Novovolynsk
FC Shakhtar Smolianka	10–0	FC Avanhard Shostka
FC Avanhard Fastiv	1–5	FC Zirka Chernihiv

=== Second qualification round ===
Team 1	Score	Team 2
FC Burevisnyk Melitopol	1–2	FC Avanhard Ordzhonikidze
FC Shakhtar Oleksandriya	1–4	FC Start Chuhuiv
FC Avanhard Chernivtsi	5–2	FC Shakhtar Sokal
FC Shakhtar Korostyshiv	4–1	FC Avanhard Kamianets-Podilskyi
FC Zirka Chernihiv	1–3	FC Shakhtar Smolianka

=== Quarterfinals (1/4) ===
Team 1	Score	Team 2
FC Avanhard Chernivtsi	1–3	FC Shakhtar Korostyshiv
FC Start Chuhuiv	x–x	
FC Avanhard Ordzhonikidze	x–x	
FC Shakhtar Smolianka	x–x	

=== Semifinals (1/2) ===
Team 1	Score	Team 2
FC Start Chuhuiv	2–0	FC Avanhard Ordzhonikidze
FC Shakhtar Smolianka	4–1	FC Shakhtar Korostyshiv

=== Final ===
Team 1	Score	Team 2
FC Start Chuhuiv	1–0	FC Shakhtar Smolianka
