= Zoltan Miles =

Soviet football player (1944–1997)

Personal information
- Full name: Zoltan Zoltanovich Miles
- Date of birth: 18 March 1944
- Place of birth: Munkács, Hungary (now Ukraine)
- Date of death: 30 August 1997 (aged 53)
- Place of death: Moscow, Russia
- Height: 1.75 m (5 ft 9 in)
- Position: Goalkeeper

Senior career*
Years	Team	Apps	(Gls)
1961	FC Spartak Ivano-Frankivsk	2	(0)
1962	FC Avanhard Ternopil	1	(0)
1963	FC Dynamo Kyiv	0	(0)
1964–1966	LVVPU Soviet Army and Navy		(0)
1966–1968	FC Chayka-VMS Sevastopol		(0)
1968–1969	FC Lokomotiv Kherson	58	(0)
1969–1976	FC Lokomotiv Moscow	222	(0)
1977	FC Zimbru Chișinău	34	(0)
- * Club domestic league appearances and goals

Zoltan Zoltanovich Miles (Russian: Золтан Золтанович Милес; 1944 — 1997) was a Soviet footballer of Hungarian origin who played as a goalkeeper. He had 64 top-flight appearances with FC Lokomotiv Moscow captaining the team for years, having gained fame as a penalty killer during his spell in Moscow and also kept 89 clean sheets, a club record later beaten by Sergei Ovchinnikov. Zoltan had a younger brother, Vasily (born 1946), who enjoyed a lengthy career as a striker and earned 8 top-flight appearances at FC Shakhtar Donetsk.
