= 1950 Cup of the Ukrainian SSR =

The 1950 Ukrainian Cup was a football knockout competition conducting by the Football Federation of the Ukrainian SSR and was known as the Ukrainian Cup.

== Competition schedule ==
=== First elimination round ===
Urozhai Kharkiv	1:2	Lokomotyv Poltava
Dzerzhynets Kriukiv	1:3	Torpedo Dnipropetrovsk
Spartak Uzhhorod	2:0	Iskra Mukachevo
Vympel Chernihiv	4:1	Lokomotyv Smila
Spartak Kherson	14:2	Kirovohrad Oblast
Metalurh Zaporizhia	+/-	Stalino Oblast	(no show)

=== Second elimination round ===
Spartak Uzhhorod	+/-	Chervonyi Prapor Chernivtsi	(no show)
Spartak Stanislav	1:2	Naftovyk Stryi
Dynamo Proskuriv	1:3	Izmail team
Dynamo Kamianets-Podilskyi	4:0	ODO Lvov
Naftovyk Drohobych	2:1	Dynamo Lutsk
Shakhtar Smolianka	1:2	Metalurh Dniprodzerzhynsk
Metalurh Voroshylovsk	3:2	Kahanovytskyi Raion Kharkiv
Lokomotyv Poltava	1:2	Metalurh Zaporizhia	1:1 (replay)
Traktor Osypenko	1:0	Torpedo Dnipropetrovsk
Mashynobudivnyk Pryluky	2:1	Chernihiv team
Zirka Konotop	+/-	Dynamo Vinnytsia	(no show)
Traktor Kirovohrad	2:1	Spartak Kherson

=== Third elimination round ===
Spartak Uzhhorod	5:0	Dzerzhynskyi Raion Kharkiv
Naftovyk Stryi	0:1	Dynamo Chernivtsi
Dynamo Mykolaiv	1:0	Izmail team
Dynamo Kamianets-Podilskyi	1:3	Naftovyk Drohobych
Metalurh Dniprodzerzhynsk	3:4	Metalurh Voroshylovsk
Metalurh Zaporizhia	5:1	Traktor Osypenko
Mashynobudivnyk Pryluky	0:1	Zirka Konotop
Traktor Kirovohrad	9:1	Zhytomyr team

=== Quarterfinals ===
Spartak Uzhhorod	2:0	Dynamo Chernivtsi
Dynamo Mykolaiv	2:0	Naftovyk Drohobych
Metalurh Voroshylovsk	1:2	Metalurh Zaporizhia
Zirka Konotop	5:0	Traktor Kirovohrad

=== Semifinals ===
Spartak Uzhhorod	2:1	Dynamo Mykolaiv
Metalurh Zaporizhia	7:1	Zirka Konotop

=== Final ===
The final was held in Kyiv.

10 September 1950

Spartak Uzhhorod	4–2	Metalurh Zaporizhia

Kyiv

== Top goalscorers ==
Scorer	Goals	Team
(Ukrainian Soviet Socialist Republic)	?	

Ukrainian Cup 1950 Winners

FC Mashynobudivnyk Kyiv
Second title

== See also ==
- Soviet Cup
- Ukrainian Cup
