= 1986 Football Cup of Ukrainian SSR among KFK =

1986 Ukrainian Amateur Cup
Tournament details
- Country: Soviet Union (Ukrainian SSR)

Final positions
- Champions: FC Mashynobudivnyk Borodianka
- Runners-up: FC Zirka Berdychiv

The 1986 Football Cup of Ukrainian SSR among KFK was the annual season of Ukraine's football knockout competition for amateur football teams.

== Competition schedule ==
=== Qualification round ===
Team 1	Score	Team 2
FC Khvylia Mykolaiv	2–2	FC Avanhard Dzhankoy
FC InGOK Inhulets	1–0	FC Kolos Chornobai
FC Nyva Berezhany	6–1	FC Pidshypnyk Lutsk
FC Mashynobudivnyk Borodianka	w/o	FC Motor Poltava

=== Quarterfinals (1/4) ===
Team 1	Score	Team 2
TBD	x–x	TBD
TBD	x–x	FC Avanhard Dzhankoy
FC Zirka Berdychiv	x–x	TBD
FC Mashynobudivnyk Borodianka	0–0	FC Avtomobilist Sumy

=== Semifinals (1/2) ===
Team 1	Score	Team 2
TBD	x–x	FC Zirka Berdychiv
FC Mashynobudivnyk Borodianka	3–2	FC Avanhard Dzhankoy

=== Final ===
Team 1	Agg.	Team 2	1st leg	2nd leg
FC Zirka Berdychiv	2–3	FC Mashynobudivnyk Borodianka	1–1	1–2 (a.e.t.)

== See also ==
- 1986 KFK competitions (Ukraine)
