= 1974 Cup of the Ukrainian SSR =

Tournament details
- Country: Ukrainian SSR
- Teams: 20

Final positions
- Champions: SC Tavriya Simferopol
- Runners-up: FC Avtomobilist Zhytomyr

The 1974 Ukrainian Cup was the 22nd edition of the Ukrainian SSR football knockout competition, known as the Ukrainian Cup. The competition started on May 24, and its final took place on November 16, 1974.

The last year cup holder FC Zirka Kirovohrad was defeated in the first round by SC Lutsk.

This year involved participation of three teams out of the Soviet First League as well. They entered the competition at quarterfinals.

== Teams ==
=== Tournament distribution ===
The competition was conducted among all 18 Ukrainian clubs of the 1974 Soviet Second League, Zone 6 and all 3 Ukrainian clubs of the 1974 Soviet First League.

First round (18 teams)	18 entrants from the Second League (Zone 6)	
Second round (8 teams)		8 winners from the First round
Quarterfinals (8 teams)	3 entrants from the First League	4 winners from the Second round; Lokomotyv Kherson received bye for the Second round

=== Other professional teams ===
The six Ukrainian professional teams in the Soviet Top League did not take part in the competition.

- 1974 Soviet Top League (6): FC Chornomorets Odesa, FC Dnipro Dnipropetrovsk, FC Dynamo Kyiv, FC Karpaty Lviv, FC Shakhtar Donetsk, FC Zorya Voroshylovhrad

== Competition schedule ==
=== First round (1/16) ===
The first legs were played on 24 May, and the second legs were played on 12 June 1974.

Team 1	Agg.	Team 2	1st leg	2nd leg
Budivelnyk Ternopil	2–3	FC Lokomotyv Kherson	2–1	0–2
FC Lokomotyv Vinnytsia	2–3	FC Avanhard Sevastopol	1–0	1–3
FC Bukovyna Chernivtsi	2–4	FC Kolos Poltava	0–0	2–4
FC Avtomobilist Zhytomyr	2–1	FC Frunzenets Sumy	2–0	0–1
FC Dynamo Khmelnytskyi	0–3	FC Sudnobudivnyk Mykolaiv	0–0	0–3
FC Zirka Kirovohrad	0–2	SC Lutsk	0–0	0–2
FC Hranyt Cherkasy	3–3 (a)	FC Avanhard Rivno	3–1	0–2
FC Hoverla Uzhhorod	3–0	FC Metalist Kharkiv	2–0	1–0
SC Chernigov	2–1	FC Kryvbas Kryvyi Rih	2–0	0–1

=== Second round ===
The first legs were played on 20 July, and the second legs were played on 21 August 1974.

Team 1	Agg.	Team 2	1st leg	2nd leg
FC Kolos Poltava	2–2 (4–3 p)	FC Avanhard Sevastopol	1–1	1–1
FC Avtomobilist Zhytomyr	(a) 5–5	FC Sudnobudivnyk Mykolaiv	0–2	5–3
FC Avanhard Rivno	3–7	FC Hoverla Uzhhorod	2–1	1–6
SC Lutsk	4–5	SC Chernigov	3–2	1–3

=== Quarterfinals ===
The first legs were played on 23 September, and the second legs were played on 14 October 1974. Also, three clubs of the Soviet First League entered the competition FC Spartak Ivano-Frankivsk, SC Tavriya Simferopol, FC Metalurh Zaporizhia.

Team 1	Agg.	Team 2	1st leg	2nd leg
FC Spartak Ivano-Frankivsk	4–6	FC Lokomotyv Kherson	3–1	1–5
FC Kolos Poltava	0–2	FC Avtomobilist Zhytomyr	0–0	0–2
SC Tavriya Simferopol	4–1	FC Hoverla Uzhhorod	3–1	1–0
FC Metalurh Zaporizhia	5–5 (a)	SC Chernigov	4–2	1–3

=== Semifinals ===
The first legs were played on 4 November, and the second legs were played on 10 November 1974.

Team 1	Agg.	Team 2	1st leg	2nd leg
FC Lokomotyv Kherson	4–5	FC Avtomobilist Zhytomyr	4–1	0–4
SC Tavriya Simferopol	3–2	SC Chernigov	0–1	3–1

=== Final ===
The first leg was played on 12 November, and the second leg was played on 16 November 1974.

Team 1	Agg.	Team 2	1st leg	2nd leg
FC Avtomobilist Zhytomyr	1–4	SC Tavriya Simferopol	1–2	0–2

==== First leg ====
12 November 1974

FC Avtomobilist Zhytomyr	1–2	SC Tavriya Simferopol
Shyshkov 60'		Klymov 52'; Cheremysin 55'

Lenin's Komsomol Stadium, Zhytomyr
Referee: Yuriy Serhiyenko (Kharkiv)

==== Second leg ====
16 November 1974

SC Tavriya Simferopol	2–0	FC Avtomobilist Zhytomyr
Klymov 4', 70'

Lokomotiv Stadium, Simferopol
Referee: Kostiantyn Vikhrov (Kiev)

Tavriya won 4–1 on aggregate
