= 1980 Football Cup of Ukrainian SSR among KFK =

1980 Ukrainian Amateur Cup
Tournament details
- Country: Soviet Union (Ukrainian SSR)

Final positions
- Champions: Nyva Pidhaitsi
- Runners-up: Avanhard Derhachi

The 1980 Football Cup of Ukrainian SSR among KFK was the annual season of Ukraine's football knockout competition for amateur football teams.

== Competition schedule ==
=== First qualification round ===
Team 1	Score	Team 2
Burevisnyk Khmelnytskyi	1–5	Naftovyk Dolyna
Lokomotyv Kivertsi	0–5	Nyva Pidhaitsi
Shakhtar Chervonohrad	3–1	Keramik Mukachevo
Sokil Lviv	1–0	Lehmash Chernivtsi
Elektrovymiriuvach Zhytomyr	3–1	Spartak Dubno
Bilshovyk Kyiv	2–0	Kolos Tulchyn
Arsenal Kyiv	5–3	Torpedo Nizhyn
Khimik Cherkasy	0–2	Refryzherator Fastiv
Avanhard Derhachi	3–0	Lyvarnyk Sumy
Sokil Rovenky	3–2	Shakhtobudivnyk Donetsk
Transformator Zaporizhia	4–2	ZKL Dnipropetrovsk
Khvylia Mykolaiv	1–4	Meteor Simferopol
Chornomorets Yalta	0–1	Radyst Kirovohrad
Tatarbunary	-/+ (Note: Original score 1–0 was scratched due to the infringement of the regulation)	Enerhiya Nova Kakhovka
Mayak Kharkiv		team of Poltava Oblast
Kirovets Makivka		team of Luhansk Oblast

=== Second qualification round ===
Team 1	Score	Team 2
Nyva Pidhaitsi	1–0	Naftovyk Dolyna
Shakhtar Chervonohrad	1–2	Sokil Lviv
Refryzherator Fastiv	1–2	Arsenal Kyiv
Elektrovymiriuvach Zhytomyr	2–1	Bilshovyk Kyiv
Sokil Rovenky	2–2 (4–3 p)	Transformator Zaporizhia
Avanhard Derhachi	1–0	Mayak Kharkiv
Meteor Simferopol	1–2	Kirovets Makiivka
Enerhiya Nova Kakhovka	3–2	Radyst Kirovohrad

=== Quarterfinals (1/4) ===
Team 1	Score	Team 2
Nyva Pidhaitsi	1–0	Sokil Lviv
Arsenal Kyiv	1–1 (3–2 p)	Elektrovymiriuvach Zhytomyr
Sokil Rovenky	1–1 (3–5 p)	Avanhard Derhachi
Enerhiya Nova Kakhovka	2–1	Kirovets Makiivka

=== Semifinals (1/2) ===
Team 1	Score	Team 2
Nyva Pidhaitsi	3–1	Arsenal Kyiv
Enerhiya Nova Kakhovka	4–0	Avanhard Derhachi

=== Final ===
Team 1	Score	Team 2
Nyva Pidhaitsi	3–0	Avanhard Derhachi

== See also ==
- 1980 KFK competitions (Ukraine)
