= 1975 Cup of the Ukrainian SSR =

Tournament details
- Country: Ukrainian SSR
- Teams: 20

Final positions
- Champions: FC Zirka Kirovohrad
- Runners-up: SC Tavriya Simferopol

The 1975 Ukrainian Cup was the 23rd edition of the Ukrainian SSR football knockout competition, known as the Ukrainian Cup. The competition started on May 10, and its final took place on November 9, 1975.

The last year cup holder SC Tavriya Simferopol was defeated in the finals by FC Zirka Kirovohrad.

This year involved participation of four teams out of the Soviet First League as well. They entered the competition at quarterfinals.

== Teams ==
=== Tournament distribution ===
The competition was conducted among all 16 Ukrainian clubs of the 1975 Soviet Second League, Zone 6 and all 4 Ukrainian clubs of the 1975 Soviet First League.

First round (16 teams)	16 entrants from the Second League (Zone 6)	
Second round (8 teams)		8 winners from the First round
Quarterfinals (8 teams)	4 entrants from the First League	4 winners from the Second round

=== Other professional teams ===
The six Ukrainian professional teams in the Soviet Top League did not take part in the competition.

- 1975 Soviet Top League (6): FC Chornomorets Odesa, FC Dnipro Dnipropetrovsk, FC Dynamo Kyiv, FC Karpaty Lviv, FC Shakhtar Donetsk, FC Zorya Voroshylovhrad

== Competition schedule ==
=== First round (1/16) ===
The first legs were played on 10 June, and the second legs were played on 25 June 1975.

Team 1	Agg.	Team 2	1st leg	2nd leg
SC Lutsk	2–3	FC Avanhard Rivno	2–1	0–2
FC Zirka Kirovohrad	6–2	FC Lokomotyv Zhdanov	4–0	2–2
FC Sudnobudivnyk Mykolaiv	2–2 (a)	FC Bukovyna Chernivtsi	2–1	0–1
FC Hoverla Uzhhorod	2–3	FC Lokomotyv Vinnytsia	2–0	0–3
FC Lokomotyv Kherson	5–2	FC Khvylia Sevastopol	4–0	1–2
FC Kryvbas Kryvyi Rih	5–3	SC Chernigov	4–2	1–1
FC Avtomobilist Zhytomyr	1–2	FC Frunzenets Sumy	1–0	0–2
FC Kolos Poltava	3–5	FC Dynamo Khmelnytskyi	2–1	1–3

=== Second round ===
The first legs were played on 9 July, and the second legs were played on 24 July 1975.

Team 1	Agg.	Team 2	1st leg	2nd leg
FC Avanhard Rivno	0–2	FC Zirka Kirovohrad	0–0	0–2
FC Bukovyna Chernivtsi	1–1 (a)	FC Lokomotyv Vinnytsia	0–0	1–1
FC Frunzenets Sumy	2–1	FC Dynamo Khmelnytskyi	1–0	1–1
FC Lokomotyv Kherson	2–3	FC Kryvbas Kryvyi Rih	1–0	1–3

=== Quarterfinals ===
The first legs were played on 1 August, and the second legs were played on 22 August 1975. Also, four clubs of the Soviet First League entered the competition FC Spartak Ivano-Frankivsk, SC Tavriya Simferopol, FC Metalist Kharkiv, FC Metalurh Zaporizhia.

Team 1	Agg.	Team 2	1st leg	2nd leg
FC Bukovyna Chernivtsi	3–6	FC Spartak Ivano-Frankivsk	2–1	1–5
FC Kryvbas Kryvyi Rih	3–5	SC Tavriya Simferopol	1–2	2–3
FC Frunzenets Sumy	4–2	FC Metalist Kharkiv	4–1	0–1
FC Zirka Kirovohrad	6–4	FC Metalurh Zaporizhia	3–2	3–2

=== Semifinals ===
The first legs were played on 12 September, and the second legs were played on 13 October 1975.

Team 1	Agg.	Team 2	1st leg	2nd leg
FC Spartak Ivano-Frankivsk	0–1	FC Zirka Kirovohrad	0–1	0–0
SC Tavriya Simferopol	5–2	FC Frunzenets Sumy	5–1	0–1

=== Final ===
The first leg was played on 4 November, and the second leg was played on 9 November 1975.

Team 1	Agg.	Team 2	1st leg	2nd leg
FC Zirka Kirovohrad	3–2	SC Tavriya Simferopol	2–0	1–2

==== First leg ====
4 November 1975

FC Zirka Kirovohrad	2–0	SC Tavriya Simferopol
Zhuravlyov 6'; Snitko 12'

Zirka Stadium, Kirovohrad

==== Second leg ====
9 November 1975

SC Tavriya Simferopol	2–1	FC Zirka Kirovohrad
Prylepskyi; Cheremysin; Adzhem (penalty missed)		Moroz

Lokomotiv Stadium, Simferopol

Zirka won 3–2 on aggregate
