= FC VPS Kharkiv =

Ukrainian football club

FC VPS Kharkiv (Ukrainian: ВПС Харків) was a football club from Kharkiv that represented the Kharkiv Institute of the Air Force. The abbreviation stands for Air Force (Ukrainian: Військово повітряні сили, romanized: Viyskovo-povitryani syly).

In 1949 the club won the Cup of the Ukrainian SSR.
