= Kazimierz Piontkowski =

Personal information
- Date of birth: 4 March 1903
- Place of birth: Warsaw, Congress Poland, Russian Empire
- Date of death: 10 August 1938 (aged 35)
- Place of death: Khabarovsk, Far Eastern Krai, Soviet Union
- Height: 1.77 m (5 ft 9 1/2 in)
- Position: Midfielder

Youth career
- 1916: Kulykovo pole

Senior career*
Years	Team	Apps	(Gls)
1921–1922	FC Vega Odessa		
1923–1924	OGF Odessa		
1925–1928	FC Shkirtrest Odessa		
1928–1935	FC Dynamo Kyiv		
1933–1934	→ FC Trudkommuna Bolshevo (penal sentence)		
1936	FC Vympel Kyiv		
1937	FC Dynamo Khabarovsk		

International career
1924–1928	Odessa city	8	(6)
1928–1932	Kiev city	5	(0)
1924–1932	Ukraine XI	4	(0)
1932	Soviet Union XI	1	(0)
- * Club domestic league appearances and goals

Kazimierz Piontkowski (Ukrainian: Казимир Антонович Піонтковський, Kazymyr Piontkovskyi; b. 4 March [O.S. 19 February] 1903 — d. 10 August 1938) was a former Soviet and Ukrainian football player, central midfielder.

Piontkowski was a friend of Sergei Barminskiy who is considered one of the founders of Dynamo Kyiv. Both of them were executed in 1938.

According to journalist Borys Halynskyi, at the end of 1920s the Kiev newspaper "Verchirniy Kyiv" called Piontkowski the "soul of the team".

In 1932 Piontkowski debuted for the Soviet Union national football team in a home game against the Germany Workers' Team winning 3:2.

On 14 October 1937 Piontkowski was arrested by UGB UNKVD (KGB) in Khabarovsk. On 18 July 1938 he was convicted by the USSR NKVD according to the Article 58-1a of the Russian SFSR Penal Code ("treason of the Motherland"). Piontkowski was executed by a firing squad a month later on 10 August 1938 in Khabarovsk.

On 30 June 1989 Piontkowski was rehabilitated on a conclusion of the Military Prosecutor's Office of the Red Banner Far Eastern Military District (KDVO) according to the Supreme Soviet Presidium of the Soviet Union (PVS USSR) ukase of 16 January 1989.

== Honours ==
- Odessa Championship
  - Winners (1): 1925
- Soviet Union Dynamiade
  - Runners-up (1): 1929
- Ukraine Dynamiade
  - Winners (1): 1931
  - Runners-up (2): 1929, 1932
- Ukraine championship among cities
  - Winners (1): 1931
  - Runners-up (1): 1934
