= 1949 Cup of the Ukrainian SSR =

The 1949 Ukrainian Cup was a football knockout competition conducting by the Football Federation of the Ukrainian SSR and was known as the Ukrainian Cup.

== Competition schedule ==
=== First elimination round ===
Metalurh Dniprodzerzhynsk	5:1	Metalurh Zaporizhia
VVS Kharkiv	5:0	Lokomotyv Poltava
Dynamo Proskuriv	3:4	Dynamo Vinnytsia
Dynamo Lutsk	2:1	DO Rovne
DO Zhitomir	+/-	Urozhai Boryspil	(no show)
Mashynobudivnyk Sumy	+/-	Spartak Chernihiv	(no show)
Traktor Kirovohrad	3:0	Spartak Kherson
Dynamo Drohobych	3:1	Dynamo Mukachevo
Spartak Chernivtsi	0:1	Spartak Stanislav
Lokomotyv Ternopil	4:2	Dynamo Lviv

=== Second elimination round ===
Metalurh Dniprodzerzhynsk	1:2	VVS Kharkiv
Metalurh Kostiantynivka	+/-	Shakhtar Krasnodon	(no show)
Dynamo Vinnytsia	5:0	Dynamo Lutsk
DO Zhitomir	7:1	Mashynobudivnyk Sumy
Vodnyk Odessa	2:0	Dynamo Izmail
m/u 10756 Mykolaiv	?:?	ODO Kiev
Traktor Kirovohrad	3:1	Dynamo Drohobych
Spartak Stanislav	4:2	Lokomotyv Ternopil

=== Quarterfinals ===
VVS Kharkiv	5:2	Metalurh Kostiantynivka
Dynamo Vinnytsia	?:?	DO Zhitomir
m/u 10756 Mykolaiv	1:4	Vodnyk Odessa
Spartak Stanislav	0:1	Traktor Kirovohrad

=== Semifinals ===
VVS Kharkiv	+/-	Dynamo Vinnytsia
Vodnyk Odessa	3:0	Traktor Kirovohrad	1:1 (replay)

=== Final ===
The final was held in Kharkiv.

20 September 1949

VVS Kharkiv	5–1	Vodnyk Odessa

Kharkiv

== Top goalscorers ==
Scorer	Goals	Team
(Ukrainian Soviet Socialist Republic)	?	

Ukrainian Cup 1949 Winners

FC Mashynobudivnyk Kyiv
Second title

== See also ==
- Soviet Cup
- Ukrainian Cup
