= 1980 KFK competitions (Ukraine) =

KFK competitions
- Season: 1980
- Champions: Kolos Pavlohrad

The 1980 KFK competitions in Ukraine were part of the 1980 Soviet KFK competitions that were conducted in the Soviet Union. It was 16th season of the KFK in Ukraine since its introduction in 1964. The winner eventually qualified to the 1981 Soviet Second League.

== First stage ==
=== Group 1 ===
Pos	Team	Pld	W	D	L	GF	GA	GD	Pts
1	Nyva Pidhaitsi	22	17	3	2	56	13	+43	37
2	Karpaty Bushtyna	22	14	0	8	44	34	+10	28
3	Khimik Kalush	22	11	6	5	35	18	+17	28
4	Intehral Vinnytsia	22	11	6	5	31	26	+5	28
5	Vatra Ternopil	22	10	6	6	34	29	+5	26
6	Kolos Velyki Luky	22	10	4	8	28	29	−1	24
7	Shakhtar Chervonohrad	22	9	3	10	32	23	+9	21
8	Tsementnyk Mykolaiv	22	6	7	9	15	26	−11	19
9	Kolos Kamianets-Podilskyi	22	6	6	10	11	17	−6	18
10	Karpaty Kuty	22	3	10	9	15	32	−17	16
11	Budivelnyk Kuznetsovsk	22	4	4	14	19	41	−22	12
12	Budivelnyk Storozhynets	22	2	3	17	9	41	−32	7

Source: ukr-football.org.ua

=== Group 2 ===
Pos	Team	Pld	W	D	L	GF	GA	GD	Pts
1	Khimik Drohobych	22	15	3	4	41	18	+23	33
2	Zorya Khorostkiv	22	13	6	3	48	20	+28	32
3	Urozhai Kolchyno	22	11	6	5	38	25	+13	28
4	Naftovyk Dolyna	22	11	5	6	28	22	+6	27
5	Sluch Berezne	22	10	5	7	32	26	+6	25
6	Vostok Kyiv	22	7	8	7	23	19	+4	22
7	Silmash Kovel	22	8	5	9	19	33	−14	21
8	Refryzherator Fastiv	22	6	8	8	18	11	+7	20
9	Sokil Lviv	22	7	5	10	23	23	0	19
10	Elektron Ivano-Frankivsk	22	5	9	8	22	27	−5	19
11	Shkirianyk Berdychiv	22	3	5	14	10	28	−18	11
12	DOK Chernivtsi	22	2	3	17	13	53	−40	7

Source: ukr-football.org.ua

=== Group 3 ===
Pos	Team	Pld	W	D	L	GF	GA	GD	Pts
1	Frehat Pervomaisk	22	14	5	3	36	19	+17	33
2	Bilshovyk Kyiv	22	12	6	4	40	20	+20	30
3	Radyst Kirovohrad	22	10	8	4	34	13	+21	28
4	Promin Chernihiv	22	10	7	5	24	21	+3	27
5	Pres Dnipropetrovsk	22	9	6	7	22	18	+4	24
6	Mayak Kharkiv	22	8	6	8	23	29	−6	22
7	Frunzenets Sumy	22	7	8	7	20	19	+1	22
8	Okean Mykolaiv	22	7	7	8	18	19	−1	21
9	Avanhard Derhachi	22	5	9	8	16	22	−6	19
10	Sputnik Poltava	22	3	10	9	24	33	−9	16
11	Start Kharkiv	22	4	4	14	14	35	−21	12
12	Yatran Kirovohrad	22	4	2	16	17	40	−23	10

Source: ukr-football.org.ua

=== Group 4 ===
Pos	Team	Pld	W	D	L	GF	GA	GD	Pts
1	Kolos Pavlohrad	22	13	9	0	32	8	+24	35
2	Avanhard Vilnohirsk	22	14	5	3	48	15	+33	33
3	Lokomotyv Kyiv	22	10	6	6	28	23	+5	26
4	Lokomotyv Smila	22	10	3	9	30	22	+8	23
5	Avanhard Lozova	22	10	2	10	25	32	−7	22
6	Shakhtar Oleksandriya	22	10	2	10	31	30	+1	22
7	Rubin Piskivka	22	9	3	10	23	28	−5	21
8	Arsenal Kyiv	22	7	7	8	16	20	−4	21
9	Naftovyk Kremenchuk	22	9	1	12	24	23	+1	19
10	Lokomotyv Znamianka	22	8	3	11	15	22	−7	19
11	Temp Cherkasy	22	6	2	14	25	48	−23	14
12	Krystal Yahotyn	22	3	3	16	20	47	−27	9

Source: ukr-football.org.ua

=== Group 5 ===
Pos	Team	Pld	W	D	L	GF	GA	GD	Pts
1	Enerhiya Nova Kakhovka	22	17	4	1	28	15	+13	38
2	Tytan Armyansk	22	14	4	4	51	25	+26	32
3	ZKL Dnipropetrovsk	22	10	6	6	35	33	+2	26
4	Meteor Simferopol	22	8	9	5	42	28	+14	25
5	Khvylia Mykolaiv	22	9	5	8	32	25	+7	23
6	Transformator Zaporizhia	22	7	6	9	17	24	−7	20
7	Sudnoremontnyk Illichivsk	22	5	10	7	33	32	+1	20
8	Enerhiya Kurakhove	22	6	6	10	32	48	−16	18
9	Budivelnyk Yalta	22	6	6	10	21	39	−18	18
10	Kolos Skadovsk	22	5	6	11	29	44	−15	16
11	Naftovyk Kherson	22	5	4	13	21	42	−21	14
12	Enerhiya Berdiansk	22	3	8	11	26	42	−16	14

Source: ukr-football.org.ua

=== Group 6 ===
Pos	Team	Pld	W	D	L	GF	GA	GD	Pts
1	Kirovets Makiivka	22	13	6	3	36	14	+22	32
2	Sokil Rovenky	22	12	8	2	36	19	+17	32
3	Metalurh Kupiansk	22	12	5	5	38	15	+23	29
4	Azovstal Zhdanov	22	9	9	4	33	25	+8	27
5	Shakhtobudivnyk Donetsk	22	10	6	6	36	18	+18	26
6	Shakhtar Dzerzhynsk	22	11	3	8	45	20	+25	25
7	Khimik Rubizhne	22	10	4	8	30	28	+2	24
8	Shakhtar Sverdlovsk	22	7	7	8	29	21	+8	21
9	Avtomobilist Zaporizhia	22	7	3	12	33	37	−4	17
10	Avanhard Kryvyi Rih	22	7	2	13	29	32	−3	16
11	Khimik Severodonetsk	22	5	4	13	28	60	−32	14
12	Shakhtar Lysychansk	22	0	1	21	10	94	−84	1

Source: ukr-football.org.ua

== Final ==
Pos	Team	Pld	W	D	L	GF	GA	GD	Pts
1	Kolos Pavlohrad	5	3	2	0	6	3	+3	8
2	Nyva Pidhaitsi	5	3	1	1	10	3	+7	7
3	Enerhiya Nova Kakhovka	5	3	1	1	9	5	+4	7
4	Kirovets Makiivka	5	3	0	2	7	2	+5	6
5	Khimik Drohobych	5	1	0	4	4	11	−7	2
6	Frehat Pervomaisk	5	0	0	5	3	15	−12	0

Source: www.footbook.ru
