= FC Vodnyk Mykolaiv =

Ukrainian football club

FC Vodnyk Mykolaiv was a Ukrainian football club from Mykolaiv, Mykolaiv Oblast. They played in the Ukrainian First League, and were disbanded in 2004.

Notably, in the 1992–93 Ukrainian Football Amateur League, they won none of their 26 matches, with 4 ties and 22 losses.
