= FC Sluch Berezne =

FC Sluch Berezne, is a football team based in Berezne, Ukraine.

== History ==
The club appeared sometime in the 1970s.

== Honors ==
Ukrainian Cup for collective teams of physical culture

- Holders: (1): 1981
- Finalists: (1): 1982

Rivne Oblast football championship

- Winners (2): 1996, 1998
- Runners-up (4): 1983, 1987, 1997, 2009
