= LVVPU =

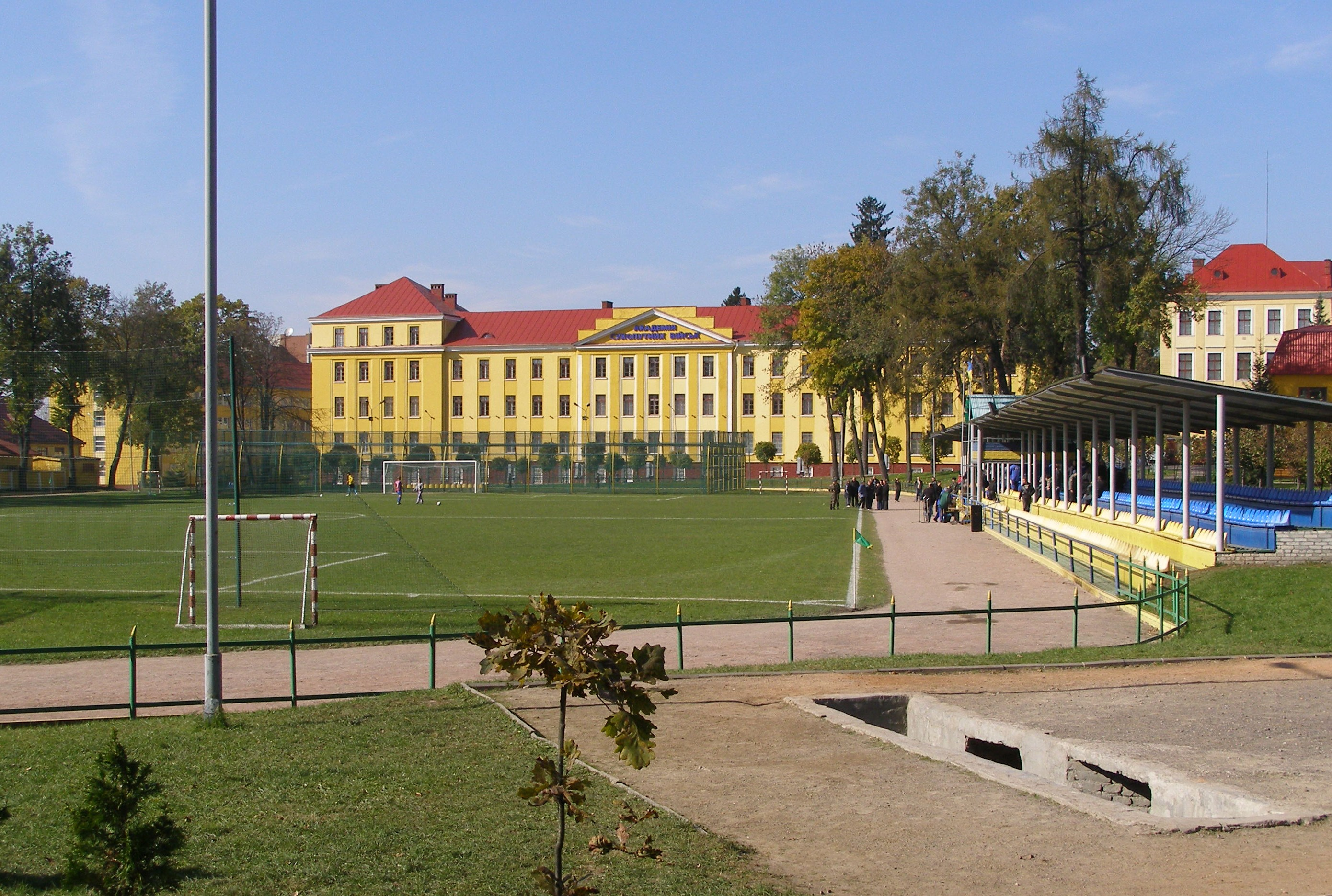
Lehion Arena, football field at the academy

LVVPU (Russian: Львовское высшее военно-политическое училище СА и ВМФ, ЛВВПУ СА и ВМФ), was a football team based in Lviv, Ukrainian SSR.

== History ==
The club was founded sometime in 1960s and originally called a team of Lviv Higher Military-Political School (LVVPU) and belonging to the Soviet Lviv Military-Political College (today the Sahaidachny Academy of Land Forces).

Among notable players were Zoltan Miles, Viktor Pasulko, Yuriy Vernydub.

== Honors ==
Soviet Cup for collective teams of physical culture

- Holders (1): 1966
- Finalists (1): 1965

Ukrainian Cup for collective teams of physical culture

- Holders: (2): 1966, 1968
- Finalists (1): 1965

Lviv Oblast football championship

- Winners (1): 1963,
- Runners-up (2): 1971, 1973,

Lviv Oblast Cup

- Holders (1): 1965,

== Coaches ==
- 1966–1966 Mikhail Khodukin
- 1971–1971 Ernest Kesler

== See also ==
- FC Sokil Lviv
