= FC Lokomotyv Smila =

Ukrainian football club

FC Lokomotyv Smila was a Ukrainian football club from Smila.

== History ==
It was one of the best football clubs from Cherkasy Oblast and it still holds the record for the number of wins in the regional championship and cup competitions. The club became a successor of FC Kharchovyk Smila that participated in the regional championship of Kiev Oblast (Note: Cherkasy Oblast was created in 1954). Lokomotyv holds a record of being the champion 10 times, while its closest pursuer Temp Cherkasy (4 wins) does not exist any longer.

Sometime in the beginning of 2000s the club was dissolved, but in 2005 it was revived at first as a farm club FC Dnipro Cherkasy under the name Dnipro-2 Smila. In 2006 it was reorganized into an independent club as FC Yavir Smila and continues to compete in the regional championships.

== League and cup history ==
Season	Div.	Pos.	Pl.	W	D	L	GS	GA	P	Domestic Cup	Europe	Notes
1995–96	4th	2	6	3	2	1	5	5	11	1/128		Zone 3, Promoted
1996–97	3rd	13	32	9	10	13	29	37	37	1/64		Group B
1997–98	3rd	11	32	10	9	13	34	40	39	1/128		Group B
1998–99	3rd	x	7	–	–	–	0	0	–	1/64		Group B, withdrew

== Honours ==
- Cherkasy Oblast Football Championship
  - Winners (11): 1964, 1965, 1966, 1967, 1968, 1969, 1970, 1971, 1973, 1974, 1995
