= FC Vykhor Dnipro =

Ukrainian football team

FC Vykhor Dnipro, is a football team based in Dnipro, Ukraine.

== History ==
The club appeared around 1960 as Avanhard Dnipropetrovsk. In 1968 the club was renamed as Vykhor.

The team was created by the newly built Dnipro Machine-Building (Engineering) Factory which was one of the most important factories of the Soviet Defense Industry. For the Soviet citizens it was better known for its production of refrigerators "Dnepr". Following the dissolution of the Soviet Union, financial situation and its production strategy at the factory was changed and with time the factory lost its potential. Since 2017 value of the factory fell in four times and was finally sold in February 2019.

The football club still competes in local competitions and in 2014 it became a champion of the city of Dnipro.

== Honors ==
Ukrainian Cup for collective teams of physical culture

- Holders: (2): 1962, 1975
- Finalists: (1): 1964

Dnipropetrovsk Oblast football championship

- Winners (4): 1962, 1974, 1980, 1981
- Runners-up (2): 1977, 1983

Dnipropetrovsk Oblast Cup

- Holders (6): 1962, 1964, 1966, 1975, 1976, 1979
- Finalists (3): 1971, 1977, 1980

== Coaches ==
- 1962 Volodymyr Mushta
- 1969–1976 Tsalik Tsadikov
- 1982–1984 Oleksiy Alekseyev
