= FC Elektron Ivano-Frankivsk =

FC Elektron Ivano-Frankivsk was a football team based in Ivano-Frankivsk, Ukrainian SSR.

== History ==
The club was founded sometime before 1972.

== Honors ==
Ukrainian Cup for collective teams of physical culture

- Holders: (1): 1976
- Finalists (1): 1977

Ivano-Frankivsk Oblast football championship

- Winners (6): 1972, 1973, 1974, 1976,1977, 1985
- Runners-up (2): 1979, 1984

Ivano-Frankivsk Oblast Cup

- Holders (5): 1973, 1974, 1976, 1977, 1983

== Coaches ==
- 1969–1972 Myroslav Dumanskyi
- 1976–1985 Roman Mazur
