= FC Start Chuhuiv =

FC Start Chuhuiv emblem

FC Start Chuhuiv, is a football team based in Chuhuiv, Ukraine.

== History ==
The club appeared sometime in 1954 and in the short period of time became the most titled football team in Kharkiv Oblast winning its regional championship 9 times. Later the record was superseded only by two other clubs both from Kupiansk, Metalurh and Lokomotyv. In 1960s Start Chuhuiv was among the most successful teams in Ukraine that did not carry the status of a "team of masters" when the team won Ukrainian and Soviet cup competitions among KFK teams.

By 1980 the teams has disappeared, but was revived once again in 2011.

== Honors ==
Soviet Cup for collective teams of physical culture

- Holders (1): 1961
- Finalists (1): 1960

Ukrainian Cup for collective teams of physical culture

- Holders: (2): 1960, 1961

Kharkiv Oblast football championship

- Winners (9): 1956, 1957, 1958, 1959, 1960, 1961, 1962, 1963, 1965
- Runners-up (1): 1964

Kharkiv Oblast Cup

- Holders (1): 1969

== Coaches ==
- 1952–1962 Oleksandr Butenko
- 1974–1974 Leonid Ostrovsky
- 2011–2012 Oleksandr Lushpenko
