= FC Mayak Valky =

Amateur football club from Valky, Ukraine

FC Olimpik Kharkiv is a former Ukrainian professional football club and a Soviet team of masters from Kharkiv.

== History ==
The football team was established in 1958 as Mayak (Lighthouse) and a factory team of the Shevchenko Kharkiv Instrument Factory. Mayak competed in the Soviet Second League and Soviet Second League B. For some period, Mayak served as a feeder team for the Soviet Top League team of masters Metalist Kharkiv. During that period, several players, before playing for Metalist, were beginning their football career playing for Mayak, such as Vitaliy Pushkutsa, Oleksandr Pryzetko, Vali Gasimov, Vladyslav Prudius, Oleksandr Horyainov, and many others. After the fall of the Soviet Union, the club was transferred to the local school of Olympic Reserve and therefore changed its name accordingly. Entering the Ukrainian competitions, Olympik was relegated out of the professional level competitions and dissolved.

In 2016, it was reorganized as a sports school (school of physical culture, UFC).

=== Names ===
- 1958 – 1990 Mayak Kharkiv
- 1991 – 1995 Olympik Kharkiv
- 2016 – UFC Olympik Kharkiv

== Honours ==
- Kharkiv Oblast Football Championship
  - Winners (4): 1967, 1968, 1969, 1970 (all as Mayak Kharkiv)

== League and cup history ==
Season	Div.	Pos.	Pl.	W	D	L	GS	GA	P	Domestic Cup	Europe	Notes
1992	3rd	6	16	5	5	6	23	26	15			Relegated
1992–93	4th	15	34	7	10	17	35	56	24			Relegated

== See also ==
- FC Metalist Kharkiv
- FC Helios Kharkiv
- FC Kharkiv
- Kharkiv State College of Physical Culture 1
