= FC Prohres Berdychiv =

Ukrainian football club from Berdychiv

Prohres
- Full name: Prohres Berdychiv
- Founded: 1946
- Dissolved: 2008
- Chairman: (Ukraine)
- Head coach: (Ukraine)

FC Prohres Berdychiv (Ukrainian: Футбольний клуб «Прогрес» (Бердичів)) was an amateur Ukrainian football club from Berdychiv.

== History ==
The club appeared sometime after 1945 as Mashynobudivnyk Berdychiv representing a local equipment manufacturer.

In 1950s for the club played Anatoliy Puzach.

In 1961 it was renamed as Prohres.

In 1968 and 1969 the club played in the Soviet Class B as the "team of masters" (professional club) and was forced into relegation due to reorganization of the competitions.

== Honours ==
- Ukrainian Amateur Cup
  - Winners (1): 1989
- Zhytomyr Oblast Championship
  - Winners (12): 1952, 1962, 1963, 1964, 1965, 1977, 1982, 1984, 1985, 1986, 1987, 1988
  - Runners-up (9): 1948, 1950, 1951, 1959, 1971, 1974, 1975, 1980, 1989
- Zhytomyr Oblast Cup
  - Winners (6): 1962, 1970, 1978, 1984, 1987, 1989
  - Runners-up (8): 1948, 1967, 1974, 1975, 1979, 1988, 1991, 1992
