= FC Sokil Lviv =

Ukrainian football club

FC Sokil Lviv was a football club based in Lviv, Lvivska Oblast, Ukraine.

== History ==
The club was founded in 1960s and disappeared sometime after 1990s. Following the fall of the Soviet Union, the club was revived as Sokil-LORTA (LORTA is the Lviv defence company).

== Honors ==
Soviet Cup for collective teams of physical culture

- Holders (1): 1967

Ukrainian football championship among amateurs

- Winners (1): 1970
- Runners-up (1): 1973

Ukrainian Cup for collective teams of physical culture

- Holders: (2): 1973, 1974
- Finalists (1): 1969

Lviv Oblast football championship

- Winners (5): 1966, 1970, 1971, 1973, 1978
- Runners-up (3): 1972, 1974, 1976 (won or runner-up)

Lviv Oblast Cup

- Holders (2): 1978, 1992
- Finalists (1): 1965

== See also ==
- LVVPU
