= FC Bilshovyk Kyiv =

Former football club based in Kyiv

FC Bilshovyk Kyiv or Bolshevik Kiev was an amateur Soviet Ukrainian football club from Kyiv.

== Overview ==
First mentioning of the team could be found for 1936 as a participant of the Soviet Cup. The team belonged to the Kyiv factory "Bilshovyk". After that it was not until after the World War II when the club consistently competes in Ukrainian republican competitions and later Ukrainian competitions among KFK (amateur level). In 1950s soon after the death of Stalin, in 1954–57 the club carried name of Torpedo Kyiv.

In 1978 Bolshevik lost final of the Soviet Cup among KFK teams to Zaria Kaluga on penalties 0–0 (2–4 p).

== Honours ==
- Soviet Cup among KFK teams
  - Runners-up (1): 1978
- Ukrainian championship among KFK teams
  - Runners-up (1): 1978
- Ukrainian Cup among KFK teams
  - Winners (3): 1964, 1967, 1978

== League and cup history ==
Season	Div.	Pos.	Pl.	W	D	L	GS	GA	P	Ukrainian Cup	Europe	Notes
1985	4th "3"	5	14	5	1	8	13	29	11			
in 1986 no record
1987	4th "4"	6	16	3	4	9	14	27	10			
1988	4th "4"	10	20	4	6	10	31	40	14			
1989	4th "4"	13	24	1	2	21	13	74	4			
1990	4th "3"	16	30	2	4	24	21	66	8			

== Coaches ==
- 1952–1952 Aleksandr Prints
- 1954–1957 Konstantin Shchegodskiy
- 1970–1971 Lazar Koval
