= Ukrainian Amateur Football Championship =

- Founded: 1964; 62 years ago (as KFK) / 1997; 29 years ago (as AAFU)
- Country: Ukraine (AAFU)
- Confederation: UEFA
- Divisions: 1
- Number of clubs: varies
- Level on pyramid: 4
- Promotion to: Ukrainian Second League (selective)
- Relegation to: none
- Domestic cup: Ukrainian Amateur Cup
- International cup: none (in 1999-2015 – UEFA Regions' Cup)
- Current champions: Ahrotekh Tyshkivka (2nd title) (2025–26)
- Most championships: 10 clubs (2 titles)
- Website: www.aafu.org.ua
- Current: 2026–27 Ukrainian Football Amateur League

The Ukrainian Amateur Football Championship (Ukrainian: Чемпіонат України з футболу серед аматорів) is an annual association football open competition in Ukraine among amateur teams. The competition is administered by the Ukrainian Association of Amateur Football (AAFU). The tournament is an open competition allowing any amateur team to participate. Although not the ultimate, it is one of the feeders of the Ukrainian football league system.

The championship replaced the Soviet competitions among collectives of physical culture (KFK). Since its introduction in 1964, the tier has been organized as a multi-group competition with regional grouping. During the Soviet period, the number of participants fluctuated between 18 in 1967 and 94 in 1990 and 1991 seasons. Following the independence, the number of participants also fluctuated between 14 in 2010 and 91 in 1994-95.

== Competition organization ==
Location of teams in the 2026-27 Ukrainian Amateur League
— Group A — Group B

=== Qualification ===
There are no requirements or restrictions on the number of representatives from each region, and participation is voluntary and/or by invitation. There is no relegation. The pool of teams, competition organization, and season regulations are reviewed on an annual basis.

The majority of teams participating in the Ukrainian Amateur football championship also compete in their respective regional (oblast) football championships. The number of groups was reduced, and their size was increased, yet to the point where the participating teams were still able to compete in their respective regional competitions.

=== Current format ===
As part of the effort to reintegrate the competition into the national league system, the competitions changed back again to a fall-spring calendar in 2016, synchronizing the competition's calendar with professional-level championships. Since the recent reorganization in 2016, the competition format has still preserved its 2 phases:

- The first being several multi-group stages divided by geographic principle,
- The second is a play-off among the group leaders to identify the season champion.

The group stage is formed of a pool of teams that play one another in a standard double-round-robin tournament, which spans from fall to spring. The playoffs, usually played in June, consist of two match legs, except for the final.

=== Promotion to the Druha Liha (PFL League 2) ===
All participating teams may apply to be admitted to Druha Liha (third tier), regardless of their placement in a given season of the amateur championship. The Druha Liha is the lowest tier of the professional three-tier league pyramid structure.

=== Previous format ===
Before 2016, the format also consisted of multiple stages: the early stages being a multi-group stage with smaller groups, and the final stage was a two-group tournament of four teams in each group. The first group stage was played in a double round-robin tournament, while the second group stage was played in a single round-robin tournament on the stadiums of one of the second stage participants. The top two winners of each group played one another in the final. The tournament was played from spring to fall.

== Historical overview ==
=== Competitions in Soviet Ukraine (competitions among KFK teams) ===
In 1964, two different championships were established: one among teams of masters (Soviet analog for professional teams) and another among collectives of physical culture (Soviet acronym KFK as representatives of "mass sports", fizkulturniks). The very first championship among KFK included 26 participants and originally consisted of 5 to 6 groups based on geographic principle. Each group consisted of 8 to 10 teams and later grew to around 16. All teams within their own groups played each other home and away games as per the round robin principle. Each group's winners advanced to the finals, which were conducted at a predesignated location with a single round robin tournament.

The original (first) members represented each region in Ukraine (oblast):

- Enerhiya Nova Kakhovka
- Strila Zaporizhzhia
- Kolhospnyk Ukrayina
- Torpedo Mykolaiv
- Shakhtar Krasnyi Luch
- Suputnyk Poltava
- Start Chuhuyiv
- Elektron Romny
- Avanhard Ordzhonikidze
- Mashynobudivnyk Druzhkivka
- Shakhtar Vatutine
- Dnipro KremHES (Svitlovodsk)
- Burevisnyk Vinnytsia
- Podillia Kamianets-Podilskyi
- Torpedo Odesa
- Kolhospnyk Kitsman
- Avanhard Pryluky
- Prohres Berdychiv
- Spartak Bila Tserkva
- Voskhod Kyiv
- Tekstylnyk Rivne
- LVVPU SA I VMF
- Budivelnyk Khust
- Khimik Kalush
- Druzhba Chortkiv
- Lokomotyv Kovel

Since 1970 the number of participants in each group was about 4–5 teams. Since then it grew to a full-pledged league-like pool of participants.

=== Competitions in independent Ukraine ===
The Soviet format stayed until 1997, when there was created the Association of Amateur Football of Ukraine (AAFU).

Following the dissolution of the Soviet Union, amateur competitions were shifted to the fall/spring calendar. The group winners, however instead of continuing to the final pool as before, were actually promoted to intermediate level, so called "Transitional League" which existed for just several years as a semi-professional tournament.

In 1996 and 1997 there took place a reorganization of all competitions under auspices of the Football Federation of Ukraine. Clubs that were competing at professional level, in 1996 organized the Professional Football League of Ukraine. The national amateur competitions were reorganized as AAFU. In 1997 the competition format also changed and there was reintroduced the final pool to identified the national winner of the amateur competition. The new format basically consisted of two stages with a final tournament chosen in the preselected city as previously in the Soviet competition. The size of groups was reduced as the number of teams decreased. In 1999, the competition calendar changed back to spring-fall competition so called all-summer event from the "european" fall/spring calendar.

In 2000 the league competitions changed again introducing extra stage (third) to avoid sudden withdrawals and eliminate financially suffering teams. In 2005 it was decided to eliminate the final game while still continue with the final tournament. In 2008 another change followed, which reduced the format back to two stages, however that did not solve the problem to increase the number of teams in the competition.

In 2010 there was an idea to incorporate the Amateur Association into the PFL as the Third League, eliminating the national amateur competition. The 2010 season also saw a record low number of participants in the competition, a pattern that might eliminate the association naturally in any case, due to poor management.

In 2016 it was decided to change back to fall-spring calendar with intention to reincorporate the amateur tier back to the Ukrainian football league structure. The competition in 2016 was shortened and later that year there started new season 2016–17. Number of groups has been reduced and number of teams in each group was increased, thus turning competitions into a true league competitions. Also the PFL announced that all clubs will be required to participate in the amateur tier before being admitted to professional level. Yet the declaration was left to be as empty and some teams were allowed to skip the amateur tier on various dubious excuses. Another declaration of the PFL stating that the league will expunge the last placed teams has been consistent, yet more than often teams relegated from professional level were simply liquidated by owners.

=== Notable clubs ===
There are former amateur and KFK teams that eventually made it to the Ukrainian Premier League.

FC Mariupol (former Lokomotyv Zhdanov), Stal Kamianske (former Metalurh Dniprodzerzhynsk), Nyva Ternopil (former Nyva Berezhany), Torpedo Zaporizhzhia, Naftovyk Okhtyrka, Vorskla Poltava, Kremin Kremenchuk, Stal Alchevsk (former Stal Komunarsk), Kolos Kovalivka, FC Mynai, Inhulets–Pyatykhatska Petrove, Rukh Lviv–Vynnyky

There are several clubs that competed at competitions for physical culture teams and later the AAFU amateur league for over 15 seasons.

Shakhtar Sverdlovsk (23 seasons), Lokomotyv Znamyanka (22), Metalurh Kupyansk (22), Avanhard Lozova (18), ODEK Orzhiv (18), Shakhtar Oleksandriya (18), Bilshovyk Kyiv (17), Khimik Kalush (17), Naftovyk Dolyna (16), Sokil Lviv (16), Tytan Armyansk (16), Refryzherator Fastiv (15), Sokil Berezhany/Pidhaitsi (15).

=== The season's final match stadiums ===
Starting from 2001, the season of the AAFU league competition ends with the season's final. Sometime after the 2015 season Bannikov Stadium became more traditional stadium of choice for the match. The first stadium where the first final match was played in 2001 is Avanhard Stadium in Luhansk.

- Bannikov Stadium, 2011, 2015, 2018, 2019, 2020, 2021, ~~2022~~, 2023, 2024
- Umanfermash Sports Complex (Illichivets Stadium), 2009, 2016
- Avanhard Stadium (Luhansk), 2001
- Olimpiyskiy Stadium (Kakhovka), 2002
- Enerhetyk Stadium (Severodonetsk), 2003
- Khimik Stadium (Slovyansk), 2004
- Ivan Stadium, 2005
- Lubny Tsentralnyi Stadion, 2006
- Mizhshkilnyi Stadium, 2007
- Kitsman Miskyi Stadion, 2008
- Zatys Stadium, 2010
- Yunist Stadium (Kolomyia), 2012
- Dinaz Stadium, 2013
- Vinnytsia Tsentralnyi Stadion, 2014
- Olimpiyskiy National Sports Complex, 2017

== Winners ==
- In **bold** are identified clubs that were granted professional status and were promoted to the Ukrainian Second League.
- ‡ – winners of the Ukrainian Amateur Cup

=== Association of Amateur Football of Ukraine (AAFU) ===
Season	Champion	Runner-up	Third (semifinalists)	Teams
2025–26	Ahrotekh Tyshkivka	Kormil Yavoriv	**Avanhard Lozova** ‡ Ahron Velyki Hayi	19
2024–25	Dnister Zalishchyky	**Atlet Kyiv**	Ahrotekh Tyshkivka ‡ **Rebel Kyiv**	20
2023–24	Ahrotekh Tyshkivka	**Probiy Horodenka**	Olimpiya Savyntsi Podoliany Ternopil	20
2022–23	**Druzhba Myrivka** ‡	Shturm Ivankiv	Olimpiya Savyntsi **Skala 1911 Stryi**	15

Season	Zone	1st place	2nd place	3rd place	Teams	
2021–22 unfinished	**1**	Ahron Velyki Hayi	Yunist Verkhnia Bilka	Urahan Cherniiv	10	29
2021–22 unfinished	**2**	**Nyva Buzova**	FC Kudrivka	Olimpiya Savyntsi	10	29
2021–22 unfinished	**3**	Motor Zaporizhzhia	**Metalurh-2 Zaporizhzhia**	Khliborob Nyzhni Torhayi	9	29

Season	Champion	Runner-up	Third (semifinalists)	Teams
2020–21	**LNZ Cherkasy** ‡	**Viktoriya Mykolaivka**	**Vovchansk** Motor Zaporizhzhia	32
2019–20	Viktoriya Mykolaivka	**Epitsentr Dunaivtsi**	LNZ-Lebedyn ODEK Orzhiv	33
2018–19	**VPK-Ahro Shevchenkivka**	Viktoriya Mykolaivka	LNZ-Lebedyn FC Malynsk	35
2017–18	Viktoriya Mykolaivka	Tavriya-Skif Rozdol	Rochyn Sosnivka ODEK Orzhiv	26
2016–17	**Ahrobiznes Volochysk**	**Metalist 1925 Kharkiv**	Chaika Petropavlivska Borshchahivka ‡ Tavriya-Skif Rozdol	24
2016	**Balkany Zoria**	Ahrobiznes Volochysk	ODEK Orzhiv FC Vradiyivka	24
2015	Balkany Zoria	**Rukh Vynnyky**	ODEK Orzhiv Kolos Zachepylivka	16
2014	Rukh Vynnyky	**AF Pyatykhatska** ‡	Zoria Bilozirya Kolos Kovalivka	21
2013	ODEK Orzhiv	Rukh Vynnyky	Zoria Bilozirya Lokomotyv Kupiansk	23
2012	Karpaty Kolomyia	Lokomotyv Kupiansk	Hvardiyets Hvardiyske Sovinyon Tayirove	18
2011	Nove Zhyttya	Putrivka	FC Sambir Torpedo Mykolaiv	24
2010	**Myr Novotroitsk Raion**	Zvyahel-750 Novohrad-Volynskyi	ODEK Orzhiv Yednist-2 Plysky	14
2009	Yednist-2	Torpedo Mykolaiv	Slovkhlib Slovyansk Irpin Horenychi	18
2008	FC Luzhany	Torpedo Mykolaiv	Lokomotyv Kupiansk Yednist-2 Plysky	25
2007	**Bastion Illichivsk**	Yednist-2 Plysky ‡	FC Luzhany	24
2006	**Shakhtar Sverdlovsk**	Hran Buzova	Khodak Cherkasy	20
2005	Ivan Odesa	**Feniks-Illychivets Kalynine**	ODEK Orzhiv	16
2004	KZEZO Kakhovka ‡	Slovkhlib Slovyansk	**Yednist Plysky**	25
2003	**Molniya Sieverodonetsk**	KZEZO Kakhovka	**Hirnyk Kryvyi Rih**	31
2002	KZEZO Kakhovka	Fakel-HPZ Varva	**Vodnyk Mykolaiv**	28
2001	**Shakhtar Luhansk**	Monolit Kostiantynivka	**Vuhlyk Dymytrov**	35
2000	HPZ Varva	Nizhyn	**Kovel-Volyn Kovel**	34
1999	**Dnister Ovidiopol**	**Tekhno-Centre Rohatyn**	Krystal Parkhomivka	24
1998–99	**Dynamo Lviv**	Krystal Parkhomivka	HPZ Varva ‡	35
1997–98	**Enerhetyk Burshtyn**	Dalis Kamyshevakha	Krystal Parkhomivka	30

=== FFU Amateur Football League ===
Decrease in number of participants trifold in 1995 and introduction of final tournament instead of simple single final group in 1996.

Season	Zone	Champion	Runner-up	Third place	Teams	
1996–97		Elektron Romny	**Cementnyk-Khorda Mykolaiv**	**Naftovyk Dolyna**	33	
1995–96	1	Pokuttia Kolomyia	Mebilnyk Chernivtsi	Karpaty Rakhiv	4	26
1995–96	2	Zoria Khorostkiv	ENKO Lutsk	Sokil Radyvyliv	5	26
1995–96	3	Paperovyk Malyn	**Lokomotyv Smila**	Budivelnyk Brovary	4	26
1995–96	4	Fakel Varva	Elektron Romny	**Avanhard Merefa**	4	26
1995–96	5	Avanhard Kramatorsk	Shakhtar Rovenky	Budivelnyk Kryvyi Rih	4	26
1995–96	6	Portovyk Kerch	Kolos Osokorivka	Blaho Blahoyeve	5	26
1994–95	1	Khimik Kalush	Yalynka Velykyi Bychkiv	Pokuttia Kolomyia	13	91
1994–95	2	Haray Zhovkva	Zoria Khorostkiv	Probiy Horodenka	13	91
1994–95	3	Obolon-Zmina Kyiv	Dynamo-3 Kyiv	Ahroservis Bakhmach	16	91
1994–95	4	Sportinvest Kryvyi Rih	Avanhard Merefa	Silur Khartsyzk	16	91
1994–95	5	Dynamo Slovyansk	Shakhtar Sverdlovsk	Metalurh Kupiansk	16	91
1994–95	6	Portovyk Illichivsk	Olimpia FC AES Yuzhnoukrainsk	Mercury Pervomaysk	17	91
1993–94	1	LAZ Lviv	**Lada Chernivtsi**	Pokuttia Kolomyia	14	87
1993–94	2	Advis Khmelnytskyi	**Keramik Baranivka**	Obolon-Zmina Kyiv	12	87
1993–94	3	Transimpeks Vyshneve	**Sula Lubny**	Ahroservis Bakhmach	15	87
1993–94	4	Avanhard Rovenky	**Vahbud Kremenchuk**	Krystal Torez	15	87
1993–94	5	Metalurh Novomoskovsk	**Shakhtar Horlivka**	Shakhtar Sverdlovsk	14	87
1993–94	6	Tavriya Novotroitsk	**Dnistrovets Bilhorod-Dnistrovsky**	Blaho Blahoyeve	17	87

=== KFK competitions of Ukraine ===
Competitions shifted to fall–spring system instead of spring-fall (summer) system and missed half of the season. There was no final group of six group winners as in previous season and all group winners were announced as champions.

Season	Zone	Champion	Runner-up	Third place	Teams	
1992–93	1	Beskyd Nadvirna	Khimik Kalush	Lada Chernivtsi	13	82
1992–93	2	Khutrovyk Tysmenytsia	Advis Khmelnytskyi	Lokomotyv Rivne	13	82
1992–93	3	Hart Borodianka	Keramik Baranivka	Dynamo-3 Kyiv	14	82
1992–93	4	Sirius Zhovti Vody	Avanhard Rovenky	Vahonobudivnyk Kremenchuk	14	82
1992–93	5	Oskil Kupiansk	Shakhtar Sverdlovsk	Shakhtar Snizhne	14	82
1992–93	6	Surozh Sudak	Tavria Novotroitsk	Blaho Blahoyeve	14	82

=== KFK competition of Ukrainian SSR ===
In bold identified teams that were admitted to professional level (became teams of masters) the following season.
‡ – winners of the Ukrainian football cup among KFK

Season	Champion	Runner-up	Third place	Teams	Groups
1991	**Novator Mariupol**	**Krystal Chortkiv**	**Polihraftekhnika Oleksandria**	94	6
1990	**Avtomobilist Sumy**	**Mayak Ochakiv**	**Stal Komunarsk**	94	6
1989	**SKA Kyiv**	Mayak Ochakiv	Krystal Chortkiv	77	6
1988	**Kremin Kremenchuk**	Stakhanovets Stakhanov	Dynamo Odesa	66	6
1987	**Dnipro Heronymivka**	Kremin Kremenchuk	Metalurh Kupiansk	54	6
1986	**Vorskla Poltava**	Metalurh Kupiansk	Spartak Sambir	52	6
1985	**Naftovyk Okhtyrka**	Spartak Sambir	Vorskla Poltava	47	6
1984	**Torpedo Zaporizhzhia** ‡	Enerhiya Nova Kakhovka	Skhid Kyiv	49	6
1983	**Dynamo Irpin**	Torpedo Zaporizhzhia	Avtomobilist Lviv	49	6
1982	**Nyva Berezhany**	Suvorovets Izmail	Skhid Kyiv	48	6
1981	**Mayak Kharkiv**	Nyva Pidhaitsi	Refryzherator Fastiv	71	6
1980	**Kolos Pavlohrad**	Nyva Pidhaitsi ‡	Enerhiya Nova Kakhovka	72	6
1979	**Shakhtar Stakhanov**	Enerhiya Nova Kakhovka ‡	Khimik Drohobych	66	6
1978	**Metalurh Dniprodzerzhynsk**	Bilshovyk Kyiv ‡	**Okean Kerch**	59	6
1977	Pryladyst Mukacheve	Tytan Armyansk ‡	Burevisnyk Ternopil	60	5
1976	Khimik Chernihiv (Note: In place of Khimik, there was revived FC Desna Chernihiv and admitted to the Second League.)	Tytan Armyansk	Elektron Ivano-Frankivsk ‡	52	5
1975	**Kolos Nikopol**	Metalurh Kupiansk	Khimik Chernihiv	46	6
1974	**Lokomotyv Zhdanov**	Kolos Nikopol	Sokil Lviv ‡	44	6
1973	**Hranyt Cherkasy**	Sokil Lviv ‡	Hirnyk Dniprorudne	44	6
1972	Enerhiya Nova Kakhovka	Avanhard Stryi	Sokil Lviv	48	6
1971	**Shakhtar Makiivka**	Karpaty Mukacheve	**Mayak Kharkiv**	48	8
1970	Sokil Lviv	Avanhard Ordzhonikidze	Khimik Chernihiv	41	5
1969	**Shakhtar Kirovsk**	Mayak Kharkiv	Meteor Zaporizhzhia	27	6
1968	Druzhba Buchach	GUS (Horlvuhlebud) Horlivka	Temp Kyiv	21	5
1967	**Avanhard Rovenky**	Avanhard Vilnohirsk	Temp Kyiv	18	4
1966	Metalist Sevastopol	Kolhospnyk Buchach	Avanhard Kryukiv	27	6
1965	Metalist Sevastopol	Avtoshklo Kostiantynivka	Budivelnyk Khust	28	6
1964	Enerhiya Nova Kakhovka	**Shakhtar Krasnyi Luch**	LVVPU Lviv	26	6

=== Top scorers ===
Season	Top scorer	Goals
2023–24	Taras Hromyak (Ahron Velyki Hayi)	15
2022–23	Yuriy Cherepushchak (Skala 1911 Stryi)	8
2021–22	Nazar Voloshyn (FC Kudrivka)	9
2020–21	Vadym Shavrin (FC Sumy)	22
2019–20	Kostiantyn Bezyazychnyi (Viktoriya Mykolaivka)	15
2018–19	Mykhailo Kolomoyets (VPK-Ahro Shevchenkivka)	21
2017–18	Robert Hehedosh (FC Minaj)	14
2016–17	Mykola Temnyuk (Ahrobiznes Volochysk)	18
2016	Andriy Donets (Ahrobiznes Volochysk)	6
2015	Oleksandr Bondarenko (Kolos Kovalivka)	11
2014	Oleh Sheptytskyi (Rukh Vynnyky)	7
2014	Valentyn Poltavets (Balkany Zorya)	7
2013	Oleh Sheptytskyi (Rukh Vynnyky)	6
2013	Oleksandr Melashchenko (Nove Zhyttia Andriyivka)	6
2012	Denys Kovalenko (Sovinyon Tayirove)	14
2012	Roman Tormozov (Torpedo Mykolaiv)	14
2011	Roman Tormozov (Torpedo Mykolaiv)	13
2010	Yuriy Perin (Zvyahel-750 Novohrad-Volynskyi)	13
2009	Serhiy Zhyhalov (Myr Hornostayivka)	7

Season	Top scorer	Goals
2008	Yevhen Ryabchuk (Zirka Kyiv)	8
2008	Volodymyr Baranovskyi (Sokil Zolochiv)	8
2007	Irakliy Burdzhanadze (Bastion Illichivsk)	9
2006	Ihor Yatsenkiv (Sokil Sukhovolya)	8
2005	Oleksiy Antyukhin (Feniks-Illichovets Kalinine)	8
2004	Volodymyr Lebid (KZEZO Khakhovka)	16
2003	Oleksiy Ananichev (KZEZO Khakhovka)	11
2002	Oleksiy Ananichev (KZEZO Khakhovka)	13
2001	Kostiantyn Pinchuk (Shakhtar Luhansk)	20
2000	Hocha Hohokhia (FC Nizhyn)	14
1999	Volodymyr Kress (Dnister Ovidiopol)	10
1998–99	Valeriy Kornyev (HPZ Varva)	11
1997–98	Vasyl Kostyuk (Enerhetyk Burshtyn)	9
1996–97	Hennadiy Strilyanyi (Lokomotyv / Elektron)	7
1995–96	Andriy Chachkin (Zoria Khorostkiv)	7
1994–95	Vasyl Lomaka (Shakhtar Sverdlovsk)	30
1993–94	Oleksandr Dovhalets (Advis Khmelnytskyi)	27
1992–93	Serhiy Akymenko (Shakhtar Snizhne)	23

== Statistics ==
=== Winners by region ===
- Statistics as of 2026

Region	CoA	Winners	Winning clubs
Luhansk Oblast		7	Avanhard Rovenky (twice), Shakhtar Sverdlovsk, Shakhtar Stakhanov, Molniya Sieverodonetsk, Shakhtar Luhansk, Shakhtar Kirovsk
Dnipropetrovsk Oblast		7	Kolos Nikopol, Sportinvest Kryvyi Rih, Metalurh Novomoskovsk, Sirius Zhovti Vody, Kolos Pavlohrad, Metalurh Dniprodzerzhynsk, VPK-Ahro Shevchenkivka
Kherson Oblast		6	Enerhiya Nova Kakhovka (twice), KZEZO Kakhovka (twice), Tavriya Novotroitsk, Myr Hornostayivka
Ivano-Frankivsk Oblast		6	Khimik Kalush, Pokuttia Kolomyia, Karpaty Kolomyia, Enerhetyk Burshtyn, Beskyd Nadvirna, Khutrovyk Tysmenytsia
Odesa Oblast		6	Balkany Zoria (twice), Bastion Illichivsk, Ivan Odesa, Dniester Ovidiopol, Portovyk Illichivsk
Lviv Oblast		5	Rukh Vynnyky, Sokil Lviv, Dynamo Lviv, Haray Zhovkva, LAZ Lviv
Sumy Oblast		5	Viktoriya Mykolaivka (twice), Elektron Romny, Avtomobilist Sumy, Naftovyk Okhtyrka
Donetsk Oblast		5	Novator Mariupol (twice), Avanhard Kramatorsk, Dynamo Sloviansk, Shakhtar Makiivka
Chernihiv Oblast		4	HPZ Varva (twice), Yednist-2 Plysky, Khimik Chernihiv
Kyiv Oblast		4	Transimpeks Vyshneve, Hart Borodianka, Dynamo Irpin, (Nyva Buzova), Druzhba Myrivka
Ternopil Oblast		4	Nyva Berezhany, Druzhba Buchach, Zoria Khorostkiv, (Ahron Velyki Hayi), Dnister Zalishchyky
Poltava Oblast		3	Kremin Kremenchuk, Vorskla Poltava, Nove Zhyttia Andriyivka
Cherkasy Oblast		3	Dnipro Heronymivka (twice), LNZ Cherkasy
Kharkiv Oblast		2	Mayak Kharkiv, Oskil Kupiansk
Khmelnytskyi Oblast		2	Advis Khmelnytskyi, Ahrobiznes Volochysk
AR Crimea		2	Okean Kerch, Surozh Sudak
Kyiv		2	Obolon-Zmina Kyiv, SKA Kyiv
Sevastopol		2	Metalist Sevastopol (twice)
Kirovohrad Oblast		2	Ahrotekh Tyshkivka (twice)
Zaporizhzhia Oblast		1	Torpedo Zaporizhzhia, (Motor Zaporizhzhia)
Zakarpattia Oblast		1	Karpaty Mukacheve
Rivne Oblast		1	ODEK Orzhiv
Chernivtsi Oblast		1	Luzhany
Zhytomyr Oblast		1	Paperovyk Malyn

=== Teams with the biggest number of seasons ("Most loyal teams") ===
In parentheses seasons in the Football Federation of the Ukrainian SSR before 1959 and year the first appearance

- 23 – Shakhtar Sverdlovsk (1957, 3)
- 22 – Metalurh Kupiansk, Lokomotyv Znamianka (1948, 2)
- 18 – Shakhtar Oleksandria (1948, 6), ODEK Orzhiv, Avanhard Lozova
- 17 – Khimik Kalush (1956, 3), Bilshovyk Kyiv (1952, 1)
- 16 – Tytan Armyansk, Naftovyk Dolyna, Sokil Lviv
- 15 – Refryzherator Fastiv, Sokil Berezhany
- 14 – Vostok Kyiv, Radyst Kirovohrad
- 13 – Lokomotyv Smila, Kirovets Makiivka, Avanhard Rovenky, Frehat Pervomaisk, Silmash Kovel, Prohres Berdychiv
- 12 – Pivdenstal Yenakiieve, Pokuttia Kolomyia (including Silmash), Lokomotyv Kupiansk (1949, 1), Naftovyk Okhtyrka (including Naftovyk-2)
- 11 – Yednist Plysky (including Yednist-2 Plysky), Avanhard Kramatorsk (including Bliuminh in 1936, 16), Shakhtar Dzerzhynsk, SC Kakhovka, Torpedo Mykolaiv (1958, 1)

== Teams that skipped the tier ==
The following clubs/teams skipped the amateur competitions or competitions among collectives of physical culture and were admitted to professional competitions. A lot of times some second teams of professional clubs that were already competing were allowed to enter professional ranks and without participation in amateur competitions. The AAFU competitions over time became more of an option rather than a mandatory tier in a football league pyramid hierarchy.

- 1992 (spring): none (15 promoted)
- 1992: FC Dynamo Luhansk, FC Avanhard Zhydachiv, FC Borysfen Boryspil (6 promoted)
- 1993: FC Medyk Morshyn, FC Viktor Zaporizhzhia, FC Lviv (1992) (6 promoted)
- 1994: Ros-2 → FC Slavutych (12 promoted)
- 1995: Temp-2 Khmelnytskyi [Ratusha Kamianets-Podilskyi], FC Metalurh Donetsk, FC Metalurh Mariupol (12 promoted)
- 1996: FC Petrivtsi, FC Nyva Bershad (6 promoted)
- 1997: FC Karpaty-2 Lviv, FC Borysfen Boryspil, FC SKA-Lotto Odesa, FC Dynamo Odesa, FC Dnipro-2 Dnipropetrovsk, FC Fortuna Sharhorod, FC Zirka-2 Kirovohrad, FC Vorskla-2 Poltava, FC Metalurh-2 Donetsk, FC Hirnyk Pavlohrad (10 promoted)
- 1998: FC VPS Kramatorsk, FC Metalurh-2 Zaporizhzhia, FC Kryvbas-2 Kryvyi Rih
- 1999: FC Prykarpattia-2 Ivano-Frankivsk, FC Nyva Vinnytsia, FC Obolon-2 Kyiv, FC ADOMS Kremenchuk, FC Mashynobudivnyk Druzhkivka
- 2000: FC Ternopil-Nyva-2, FC Dnipro-3 Dnipropetrovsk, FC Cherkasy-2, FC Shakhtar-3 Donetsk, FC Metalurh-2 Mariupol, SSSOR-Metalurh Zaporizhzhia, FC Stal-2 Alchevsk, FC Krasyliv, FC Sokil Zolochiv (2 promoted)
- 2001: FC Zakarpattia-2 Uzhhorod, FC Borysfen-2 Boryspil, FC Obolon-2 Kyiv, FC Metalurh-2 Donetsk, FC Chornohora Ivano-Frankivsk, FC Chaika-VMS Sevastopol, FC Torpedo Zaporizhzhia, FC Dynamo Simferopol (5 promoted)
- 2002: none (4 promoted)
- 2003: FC Arsenal-2 Kyiv, FC Kryvbas-2 Kryvyi Rih, FC Palmira Odesa (7 promoted)
- 2004: PFC Oleksandriya, MFC Oleksandriya, FC Fakel Ivano-Frankivsk (5 promoted)
- 2005: MFC Zhytomyr, FC Kryvbas-2 Kryvyi Rih, FC Kharkiv-2, FC Knyazha Shchaslyve, FC Arsenal Kharkiv (5 promoted)
- 2006: none (2 promoted)
- 2007: FC Korosten, FC Komunalnyk Luhansk, FC Poltava, FC Tytan Donetsk (5 promoted)
- 2008: FC Knyazha-2 Schaslyve, PFC Sevastopol-2 (3 promoted)
- 2009: FC Lviv-2 (1 promoted)
- 2010: FC Chornomorets-2 Odesa, FC Dnipro-2 Dnipropetrovsk (1 promoted)
- 2011: PFC Sevastopol-2 (8 promoted)
- 2012: FC Obolon-2 Kyiv, FC Poltava-2 Karlivka (3 promoted)
- 2013: none (2 promoted)
- 2014: no teams were admitted at all
- 2015: NK Veres Rivne, FC Arsenal–Kyiv (4 promoted)
- 2016: FC Illichivets-2 Mariupol (9 promoted)
- 2017–18: MFC Mykolaiv-2, SC Dnipro-1 (6 promoted)
- 2018–19: none (6 promoted)
- 2019–20: FC Obolon-Brovar-2 Bucha, FC Chornomorets-2 Odesa, FC Avanhard-2 Kramatorsk (4 promoted)
- 2020–21: Volyn-2 Lutsk, Metal Kharkiv
- 2021–22: none
- 2022–23: FC Khust
- 2023–24: Rukh-2 Lviv, Karpaty-2 Lviv (5 promoted)

== Regions and teams ==
=== 1992–2016 ===
Season	92/93	93/94	94/95	95/96	96/97	97/98	98/99	1999	2000	2001	2002	2003	2004	2005	2006	2007	2008	2009	2010	2011	2012	2013	2014	2015	2016
Teams	82	87	91	26	33	30	35	24	34	35	28	31	25	16	20	24	25	18	14	24	18	23	21	16	24
AR Crimea	1	2	2	1	1	1	2		1	1		1	1	2			1				4	2			
Cherkasy	2	1	2	1		3			1	1	1	2		1	2	1	2	1		1	1	2	2		
Chernihiv	3	2	2	1	1	1	2	2	2	3	3	3	4	2		1	2	1	1	1		2	2	2	1
Chernivtsi	1	1		1			1			2	1	2				1	1	1				1			1
Dnipropetrovsk	4	7	9	1	3				1	3	1	1	1		1		1		1				1	1	1
Donetsk	8	12	15	1	4	5	3	1	4	4	5	1	3	1	1	1		1		2		1	1		
Ivano-Frankivsk	5	5	7	1	1	1	2	1	1			1	1		1	1	1	1			1				1
Kharkiv	4	4	5	1	2	2	3	4	1	1		2	1	1	2	1	1	1	1	1	2	1	1	1	
Kherson	3	4	3	1					1		1	2	2	1		1	1	1	2	2		1	1	2	2
Khmelnytskyi	3	3	2	1		1	1	1	1	1			1		1	2	1	2	1	1		1	1		2
Kyiv	4	7	6	2	3	3	5	4	4	1	1	2		1	1	2	2	3		2	1	2	1	1	1
Kirovohrad	3	1	2	1	2	1	3		2	2	1	1				2	1	1	2	2	1	1	3	1	1
Lviv	3	4	6	1	3	1	1		1	1		1	1		1	1	1	1		1		1	1	2	1
Luhansk	5	4	3	1	1	1	1	1	2	2	2	2			1					2					
Mykolaiv	4	3	3	1	1	1	1	2	1	1	2	2		1			1	1	1	1	1	2	2		2
Odesa	5	6	7	1			1	1	1	2		2	2	1	3	3	1	1		2	3	1	1	2	2
Poltava	3	4	2	1			1	1	2		2		1		1	1				1	1	1			
Rivne	1	1	1	1	1	2	2	2	2	2	2	2	3	2	1	2	2	1	1	1	1	1	2	1	2
Sumy	4	4	4	1	3	1	2	1	1	1	2	1			1					1		1			
Ternopil	3	2	1	1	1	2		1	1	1	1		1	1		1	1		2		1				1
Vinnytsia	3	1	2	1			1	1	1	1		1	1		1	2	1	1				1	1	1	2
Volyn	3	2	3	1	1	1	2		1	2		1					1								1
Zakarpattia	2	3	3	1	1	1																			
Zaporizhzhia	2	2	1	1	2	1			1	1	1	1	1	2			1							1	2
Zhytomyr	3	2		1	2	1	1	1	1	2	1		1		2	1	2		2	4	1	1	1	1	1
Season	92/93	93/94	94/95	95/96	96/97	97/98	98/99	1999	2000	2001	2002	2003	2004	2005	2006	2007	2008	2009	2010	2011	2012	2013	2014	2015	2016
Teams	82	87	91	26	33	30	35	24	34	35	28	31	25	16	20	24	25	18	14	24	18	23	21	16	24

=== 2016–present ===
Season	16/17	17/18	18/19	19/20	20/21	21/22	22/23	23/24	24/25	25/26	26/27
Teams	24	26	35	33	32	29	15	20	20	19	17
AR Crimea	1*										
Cherkasy			1	2	1					1	
Chernihiv	2	3	2	3	1	1					
Chernivtsi					1	1					
Dnipropetrovsk		1	5	3	4	2		1	1		
Donetsk		1	1	1							
Ivano-Frankivsk	1	2	2	2	1	2	1	2			
Kharkiv	3		1	1	1			1	1	1	
Kherson		3	4	2	1	2					
Khmelnytskyi	1	1	1	1			1	1	1	1	1
Kyiv	1	2	4	3	6	7	4	3	5		
Kirovohrad	1	1	1	2	1	1	1	2	2	1	1
Lviv	2	1	1		2	2	2	2	2	2	2
Luhansk											
Mykolaiv	2	1	1	1	1	1					
Odesa								1	1	1	1
Poltava				1	2	1	1	1	2	3	3
Rivne	2	2	3	2	1	2				2	2
Sumy	1	2	2	2	3	1	1	1	1	1	1
Ternopil	3	2	3	2	2	2	1	2	3	2	2
Vinnytsia		1	1	1			1			1	
Volyn	2			3	1		1			1	2
Zakarpattia		1	1		1			2			
Zaporizhzhia	1	2	1	1	2	3	1				1
Zhytomyr	1					1		1	1	2	1
Season	16/17	17/18	18/19	19/20	20/21	21/22	22/23	23/24	24/25	25/26	26/27
Teams	24	26	35	33	32	29	15	20	20	19	17

== Participated teams by regions ==
In bold are teams that played at least 10 seasons. In brackets is a number of seasons.

Region	Teams
Crimea	Kolhospnyk Ukrayina Yarkoe Pole (1964 {1}), Metalist Sevastopol (1965, 1966, 1970, 1971, 1978 {5}), Avanhard Kerch (1966 {1}), Molot Yevpatoria (1968 {1}), Avanhard Simferopol (1969 – 1973, 1975 {6}), Koktebel Shchebetivka (1970 {1}), Chornomorets Sevastopol (1972, 1973, 1996/97 {3}), Atlantyka Sevastopol (1974 {1}), **Tytan Armyansk** (1974 – 1982, 1985 – 1991 {16}), Budivelnyk Yalta (1976, 1979, 1980, 1982 {4}), Avanhard Dzhankoy (1977, 1978, 1981, 1984, 1988 {5}), Okean Kerch (1977, 1978 {2}), Meteor Simferopol (1979 – 1981 {3}), Chornomorets Yalta (1981 {1}), Vynohradar Alushta (1983 {1}), SKCF Sevastopol (1988 – 1990 {3}), More Feodosia (1989 – 1991, 1993/94 {4}), Dynamo Saky (1990, 1991, 1997/98 {3}), Surozh Sudak (1991, 1992/93, 1994/95 {3}), Syvash Ishun (1991 {1}), Chaika Okhotnykove (1993/94, 1994/95 {2}), Portovyk Kerch (1995/96 {1}), SVKh-Danika Simferopol (1998/99, 2000, 2001 {3}), Hirnyk Balaklava (1998/99 {1}), Krymteplytsia Molodizhne (2003 {1}), Khimik Krasnoperekopsk (2004 {1}), Feniks-Illichovets Kalinine (2005 {1}), Yalos Yalta (2005 {1}), Chornomornaftohaz Simferopol (2008 {1}), Hvardiets Hvardiiske (2012, 2013 {2}), ITV Simferopol (2012, 2013 {2}), Zhemchuzhyna Yalta (2012 {1}), Foros Yalta (2012 {1}), Tavria Simferopol (2016/17 {1})
Cherkasy Oblast	Shakhtar Vatutine (1964, 1969 {2}), **Lokomotyv Smila** (1965 – 1968, 1971, 1972, 1975 – 1980, 1995/96 {13}), Avanhard Uman (1970 {1}), Fotoprylad Cherkasy (1972, 1975, 1977 {3}), Hranyt Cherkasy (1973 {1}), Zorya Uman (1976, 1997/98 {2}), Dnipro Cherkasy (1976, 1985, 1986, 2003, 2019/20 {5}), Temp Cherkasy (1980, 1987, 1988 {3}), Tsukrovyk Horodyshche (1981 {1}), Mashynobudivnyk Smila (1981 {1}), Prapor Chyhyryn (1982 {1}), Khimik Cherkasy (1983 {1}), Tiasmyn Smila (1984, 1985, 1989, 1990 {4}), Kolos/Dnipro Heronymivka (1986, 1987* {2}), Avanhard Smila (1988 {1}), Kolos Chornobai (1988, 2000, 2002 {3}), Rotor Cherkasy (1989 – 1992/93 {4}), Yatran Uman (1990, 1993/94, 1994/95 {3}), Nyva-Naftovyk Korsun-Shevchenkivskyi (1990, 1994/95 {2}), Spartak Zolotonosha (1991, 1992/93 {2}), Zirka Smila (1997/98 {1}), Rybka Cherkasy (1997/98 {1}), FC Drabiv (2001 {1}), DPA-TETs Cherkasy (2003 {1}), Illichivets Uman (2005, 2006 {2}), Khodak Cherkasy (2006 – 2009 {4}), Kholodnyi Yar Kamianka (2008 {1}), Slavutych Cherkasy (2011 {1}), Retro Vatutine (2012 – 2014 {3}), Zoria Biloziria (2013, 2014 {2}), LNZ Lebedyn (2018/19 – 2020/21 {3}), Karbon Cherkasy (2025/26 {1})
Chernihiv Oblast	Budivelnyk Chernihiv (1965 {1}), Mashzavod Nizhyn (1966 {1}), Khimik Chernihiv (1968, 1970 – 1976 {8}), Promin Chernihiv (1976 – 1980 {5}), Prohres Nizhyn (1981, 1982 {2}), Tekstylnyk Chernihiv (1984, 1992/93 – 1994/95 {4}), Hidrotekhnik Chernihiv (1989 {1}), Politekhnik Chernihiv (1990 {1}), Avers Bakhmach (1992/93 – 1994/95, 1996/97 {4}), Fakel Varva (1992/93, 1995/96, 1998/99 – 2003 {8}), Domobudivnyk Chernihiv (1997/98, 1998/99 {2}), FC Nizhyn (1999 – 2005 {7}), Yevropa Pryliuky (2001 – 2005 {5}), **Yednist/Yednist-2 Plysky** (2004, 2007 – 2011, 2014 – 2017/18 {11}), Interahrosystema Mena (2004 {1}), Desna-2 Chernihiv (2008 {1}), Avanhard Koriukivka (2013 – 2015, 2016/17 – 2019/20 {7}), Chernihiv (2013, 2017/18, 2019/20 {3}), Ahrodim Bakhmach (2018/19, 2019/20 {2}), FC Kudrivka (2020/21, 2021/22 {2})
Chernivtsi Oblast	Kolhospnyk Kitsman (1964 {1}), Vostok Chernivtsi (1965, 1969, 1970, 1974, 1975 {5}), Mashzavod Chernivtsi (1966 {1}), Lehmash Chernivtsi (1971, 1982, 1985, 1986 {4}), DOK Chernivtsi (1972, 1980 {2}), Avtomobilist Kitsman (1973 {1}), FC Luzhany (1976, 1977, 2001 – 2003, 2007 – 2009 {8}), Bukovyna/Bukovyna-2 Chernivtsi (1977, 2001, 2013 {3}), Budivelnyk Storozhynets (1977 – 1980 {4}), Meteor Chernivtsi (1981 {1}), HVZ Chernivtsi (1983 {1}), Karpaty Storozhynets (1984, 1987 {2}), Emalposud Chernivtsi (1988 {1}), Karpaty Chernivtsi (1989 {1}), Lada Chernivtsi (1992/93, 1993/94 {2}), Meblevyk Chernivtsi (1995/96 {1}), Dnister Novodnistrovsk (1998/99 {1}), ChTEI Chernivtsi (2003 {1}), FC Voloka (2016 {1}), Dovbush Chernivtsi (2020/21, 2021/22 {2})
Dnipropetrovsk Oblast	Avanhard Ordzhonikidze (1964, 1970 – 1972, 1986, 1987, 1990 {7}), Avanhard Terny (1965, 1966 {2}), Avanhard Vilnohirsk (1967 – 1969, 1971, 1972, 1974, 1978 – 1980 {9}), ZKL Dnipropetrovsk (1970, 1977 – 1981 {6}), Avanhard Kryvyi Rih (1971 – 1973, 1979 – 1981 {6}), Vikhr Dnipropetrovsk (1971, 1975, 1976 {3}), Kolos/Elektrometalurh Nikopol (1972, 1974, 1975, 2006, 2010 {5}), Metalurh Dniprodzerzhynsk (1977, 1978, 1989, 1992/93, 2001 {5}), Pres Dnipropetrovsk (1977 – 1980 {4}), Kolos Pavlohrad (1977 – 1980 {4}), Avtomobilist Ordzhonikidze (1982 {1}), Lokomotyv Synelnykove (1982 {1}), **Hirnyk Pavlohrad** (1983 – 1985, 1988 – 1994/95 {10}), Kolos Vasylkivka (1985 {1}), Prometei Dniprodzerzhynsk (1986, 1990, 1991, 1993/94, 1994/95 {5}), Inhulets Kryvyi Rih (1987, 1988 {2}), Olimpia Pokrovske (1989, 1990 {2}), Avanhard Zhovti Vody (1990 – 1992/93 {3}), Shakhtar Ordzhonikidze (1991 {1}), Metalurh Kryvyi Rih (1991 {1}), Budivelnyk Kryvyi Rih (1992/93 – 1995/96 {4}), Metalurh Novomoskovsk (1993/94 {1}), Shakhtar Marhanets (1993/94, 1994/95 {2}), Kolos Chkalove (1993/94 {1}), Kryvbas/Kryvbas-2 Kryvyi Rih (1993/94, 1994/95, 2016, 2020/21H {4}), SportInvest Kryvyi Rih (1994/95 {1}), Era Nikopol (1994/95 {1}), Kryvbas-Ruda Kryvyi Rih (1994/95, 1996/97 {2}), Druzhba Mahdalynivka (1994/95 {1}), Lokomotyv Dnipropetrovsk (1996/97 {1}), Obriy Nikopol (1996/97 {1}), Hirnyk Kryvyi Rih (2000 – 2004, 2017/18 {6}), Orion Dnipropetrovsk (2001 {1}), Dnipro-75 Dnipropetrovsk (2008 {1}), VPK-Ahro Shevchenkivka (2014, 2015, 2018/19 {3}), Peremoha Dnipro (2018/19, 2019/20 {2}), FC Dnipro (2018/19 {1}), FC Kryvyi Rih (2018/19 {1}), Skoruk Tomakivka (2018/19, 2020/21 {2}), Borysfen Dnipro (2019/20, 2020/21 {2}), Lehioner Dnipro (2019/20 – 2021/22 {3}), Olimp Kamianske (2021/22 {1})), Penuel Kryvyi Rih (2023/24, 2024/25 {2})
Donetsk Oblast	Mashynobudivnyk Druzhkivka (1964, 1975, 1988, 1990 {4}), Avtosklo Kostiantynivka (1965, 1971 – 1973 {4}), Khimik Sloviansk (1966, 1976, 1978 {3}), Shakhtar Donetsk (1967, 1984 – 1986 {4}), GUS Horlivka (1968 {1}), Shakhtar Makiivka (1969 – 1971, 1984, 1986, 1987, 1989, 1991, 1994/95 {9}), **Pivdenstal Yenakieve** (1970, 1985, 1987 – 1990, 1992/93 – 1994/95, 1996/97, 1998/99, 2002 {12}), Dzerzhynets Dzerzhynsk (1970 {1}), Tsvetmet Artemivsk (1970 – 1974, 1986, 1988, 1991 {8}), Sitall Kostiantynivka (1970 {1}), Vuhlyk Kramatorsk (1970 {1}), Vuhlyk Donetsk (1971, 1992/93, 1993/94 {3}), Khimik Horlivka (1971 – 1973 {3}), Shakhtar Snizhne (1971, 1989 – 1994/95 {7}), Shakhtar Torez (1972, 1996/97, 1997/98 {3}), Prometei Shakhtarsk (1972, 1989 – 1991 {4}), Vuhlyk Krasnoarmiysk (1973, 1991 {2}), **Kirovets Makiivka** (1973, 1976, 1977, 1979 – 1985, 1988, 1990, 1993/94 {13}), **Bliuminh/Avanhard Kramatorsk** (1974 – 1976, 1979, 1984, 1985, 1992/93 – 1995/96, 2011 {11}), Vohnetryvnyk Chasiv Yar (1974, 1975 {2}), Shakhtar Horlivka (1974, 1989 – 1991, 1993/94, 1997/98 {6}), Lokomotyv Zhdanov (1974 {1}), Monolit Donetsk (1974, 1975, 1977 – 1979 {5}), Metalurh Artemivsk (1976, 1977 {2}), Shakhtobudivnyk Donetsk (1977 – 1982, 1989 {7}), Enerhia Kurakhove (1980, 1981 {2}), Azovstal Zhdanov (1980, 1982, 1987 {3}), **Shakhtar Dzerzhynsk** (1980 – 1990 {11}), Shakhtar Ukrainsk (1981 {1}), Tekstylnyk Donetsk (1981, 1983, 1987 {3}), Mashynobudivnyk Artemivsk (1983 {1}), Udarnyk Snizhne (1986 {1}), Sotsdonbasovets Donetsk (1988 – 1991 {4}), Antratsyt Kirovske (1990, 1991 {2}), Novator Mariupol (1990, 1991 {2}), Krystal Torez (1991 – 1994/95 {4}), FC Khartsyzk (1991, 1994/95, 1996/97, 1997/98 {4}), Vuhlyk Dymytriv (1992/93 – 1994/95, 2001 {4}), Azovmash Mariupol (1992/93, 1993/94 {2}), Harant Donetsk (1992/93, 1993/94 {2}), Lidiyevka Donetsk (1993/94, 1994/95 {2}), Kholodna Balka Makiivka (1993/94 {1}), Shakhtar Selydove (1994/95 {1}), Hirnyk Makiivka (1994/95 {1}), Dynamo Sloviansk (1994/95 {1}), AFK-UOR Mariupol (1994/95 {1}), Aton Donetsk (1994/95 {1}), Metalurh Komsomolske (1994/95, 1996/97, 1998/99 – 2001, 2004 – 2006 {9}), Butovska Makiivka (1994/95 {1}), Hirnyk Torez (1997/98 {1}), Shakhta Ukraina Ukrainsk (1997/98, 1998/99, 2000 {3}), Fortuna Shakhtarsk (2000 {1}), Monolit Kostiantynivka (2000 – 2002 {3}), VAVK Volodymyrivka (2001, 2002 {2}), Slovkhlib Sloviansk (2002, 2004, 2009 {3}), Shakhtar Rodynske (2002 {1}), FC Torez (2003 {1}), Olimpik Donetsk (2004 {1}), Donbas-Krym Donetsk (2007 {1}), Makiivvuhillia Makiivka (2011 {1}), USC-Rubin Donetsk (2013, 2014 {2}), Yarud Mariupol (2017/18 – 2019/20 {3})
Ivano-Frankivsk Oblast	**Khimik Kalush** (1964, 1965, 1967, 1968, 1970, 1976, 1977, 1979 – 1983, 1991 – 1994/95, 2017/18 {17}), Naftovyk/Bystrytsia/Beskyd Nadvirna (1965, 1988, 1989, 1992/93, 1994/95, 1998/99 {6}), **Naftovyk Dolyna** (1966, 1978 – 1981, 1983 – 1991, 1994/95, 1996/97 {16}), Karpaty Kolomyia (1969, 2012 {2}), Budivelnyk Kalush (1971, 1972 {2}), Prylad Ivano-Frankivsk (1972, 1973 {2}), Elektron Ivano-Frankivsk (1974 – 1978, 1980, 1981, 1985, 1986 {9}), **Silmash/Pokuttia Kolomyia** (1976, 1978, 1984, 1986 1990, 1992/93 – 1995/96, 2017/18 – 2019/20 {12}), imeni Rudnieva Ivano-Frankivsk (1977 {1}), Karpaty Kuty (1979 – 1981 {3}), Lokomotyv Ivano-Frankivsk (1982, 1983 {2}), Mayak Bohorodchany (1987 {1}), Kolos Kalush (1987, 1988 {2}), Kolos Holyn (1989 {1}), Halychyna Kalush (1990 {1}), Enerhetyk Burshtyn (1990, 1991 {2}), Halychyna Broshniv (1991 – 1993/94 {3}), Khutrovyk Tysmenytsia (1992/93 {1}), Domobudivnyk Burshtyn (1993/94, 1994/95 {2}), Limnytsia Perehinske (1993/94, 1994/95 {2}), Probiy Horodenka (1994/95, 2023/24 {2}), Enerhetyk Burshtyn (1997/98 {1}), Tekhno-Tsentr Rohatyn (1998/99 – 2000 {3}), Prykarpattia-Teplovyk Ivano-Frankivsk (2003, 2016, 2021/22 {3}), Karpaty Yaremche (2004, 2008 {2}), Tsementnyk Yamnytsia (2006, 2007 {2}), Kniahynyn Pidhaichyky (2009 {1}), Oskar Pidhiria (2016/17 {1}), Karpaty Halych (2018/19, 2019/20 {2}), Varatyk Kolomyia (2020/21, 2022/23 {2}), Urahan Cherniiv (2021/22 {1}), FAPF Ivano-Frankivsk (2023/24 {1})
Kharkiv Oblast	Start Chuhuiv (1964, 1966 {2}), **Lokomotyv Kupiansk** (1965, 1967, 2004 – 2013 {12}), Yupiter Kharkiv (1968 – 1971, 1979 – 1981, 1993/94, 1994/95 {9}), Donets Izium (1970 {1}), Lokomotyv Paniutyne (1972 {1}), **Metalurh Kupiansk** (1973 – 1994/95 {22}), Mashynobudivnyk Zmiiv (1973 {1}), Lokomotyv Lyubotyn (1974 {1}), Hazovyk Shebelynka (1975 {1}), Spartak Kharkiv (1975 {1}), **Avanhard Lozova** (1976 – 1981, 1984 – 1994/95, 2023/24 – 2025/26 {20}), Kolos Zolochiv (1978, 1979 {2}), Avanhard Derhachi (1979 – 1982, 1984 {5}), Start Kharkiv (1980, 1987 {2}), ShVSM Kharkiv (1983 {1}), Trudovi Rezervy Kharkiv (1985 {1}), Tsementnyk Balakliya (1986, 1988 – 1990, 1992/93 {5}), Kolos Krasnohrad (1989 {1}), Kolos Kirova Kolomak (1990, 1991 {2}), Fakel Krasnohrad (1990, 1991 {2}), Oskil Kupiansk (1992/93 {1}), Avanhard Merefa (1993/94 – 1995/96 {3}), Vlasko Hlyboke (1994/95 {1}), Krystal Parkhomivka (1996/97 – 1999 {4}), Enerhetyk Komsomolske (1996/97 – 1998/99 {3}), FC Kharkiv (1998/99 {1}), Arsenal/Arsenal-2 Kharkiv (1999, 2000, 2012 {2}), Metalist-3 Kharkiv (1999 {1}), Solli Plius Kharkiv (1999, 2014, 2016/17 {3}), Olimpik Kharkiv (2001 {1}), Helios Kharkiv (2003 {1}), Hazovyk Kharkiv (2003 {1}), Lokomotyv Dvorichna (2006 {1}), Kolos Zachepylivka (2015 {1}), Metalist 1925 Kharkiv (2016/17 {1}), Kvadro Pervomaiskyi (2016/17 {1}), Kobra Kharkiv (2018/19 {1}), FC Vovchansk (2019/20, 2020/21 {2})
Kherson Oblast	**Enerhia Nova Kakhovka** (1964 – 1966, 1971 – 1994/95, 2010 {28}), Krystal/Lokomotyv Kherson (1965, 2011, 2017/18 {3}), Budivelnyk Henichesk (1969, 1970, 1975 – 1977 {5}), Tekstylnyk Kherson (1971 {1}), Spartak Kherson (1973 {1}), Krystal Kherson (1974 {1}), Naftovyk Kherson (1977, 1979, 1980 {3}), Kolos Skadovsk (1978 – 1981 {4}), **Kolos Osokorivka** (1981, 1983 – 1993/94, 1995/96 {12}), Shliakhovyk Kherson (1982, 1988 {2}), Meliorator/KZESO Kakhovka (1989 – 1991, 2002 – 2005 {7}), Tavria Novotroitske (1990 – 1993/94, 2018/19, 2019/20 {6}), Slavuta Novovorontsovka (1993/94 {1}), Kharchovyk Bilozerka (1994/95 {1}), Dzharylhach Skadovsk (1994/95 {1}), Dynamo Tsyurupinsk (2000 {1}), Ukrrichflot Kherson (2003, 2004 {2}), Syhma Kherson (2007 {1}), Myr Hornostaivka (2008 – 2011, 2014, 2015 {6}), Kolos Khlibodarivka (2013, 2016, 2018/19 {3}), Avanhard Kakhovka (2015, 2016 {2}), SC Kakhovka (2017/18 – 2021/22 {5}), Druzhba Novomykolaivka (2017/18, 2018/19 {2}), Khliborob Nyzhni Torhayi (2021/22 {1})
Khmelnytskyi Oblast	Podillia Kamianets-Podilskyi (1964, 1965, 1967, 1991 {4}), Burevisnyk Kamianets-Podilskyi (1966, 1976, 1978, 1985 – 1989 {8}), Avanhard Khmelnytskyi (1969 {1}), Enerhia Khmelnytskyi (1970 {1}), Sluch Krasyliv (1971 – 1976, 1979, 1992/93, 1993/94 {9}), Elektroprylad Kamianets-Podilskyi (1972 {1}), Tsementnyk Kamianets-Podilskyi (1977, 1993/94 {2}), Metalurh Starokostiantyniv (1979 {1}), Kolos Kamianets-Podilskyi (1980, 1982 {2}), Podillia Khmelnytskyi (1981, 2007, 2014, 2016 {4}), Kation Khmelnytskyi (1983 {1}), Korchahinets Shepetivka (1984 {1}), Iskra Teofipol (1989 – 1992/93, 2004, 2006 {6}), Smotrych Kamianets-Podilskyi (1990 {1}), Temp Shepetivka (1990 {1}), Advis Khmelnytskyi (1990 – 1993/94 {4}), Enerhetyk Netishyn (1994/95 {1}), Petridava Kamianets-Podilskyi (1994/95 {1}), Epitsentr Dunaivtsi (1995/96, 1997/98 – 1999, 2001, 2008 – 2010, 2019/20 {9}), Dynamo Kamianets-Podilskyi (2000 {1}), Budfarfor Slavuta (2007 {1}), Zbruch Volochysk (2009, 2011, 2013 {3}), Ahrobiznes Volochysk (2016, 2016/17 {2}), SC Khmelnytskyi (2017/18, 2018/19 {2}), Kolos Polonne (2022/23–2026/27 {5})
Kyiv City	**Vostok** (1964, 1977 – 1980, 1982 – 1990 {14}), Temp (1965, 1968, 1969 {3}), Khimik (1966 {1}), Avtomobilist (1971 {1}), Arsenal (1972 – 1977, 1979, 1980 {8}), **Bilshovyk** (1973 – 1985, 1987 – 1990 {17}), Chervonyi Ekskavator (1978 {1}), Lokomotyv (1980, 1981, 2021/22, 2022/23 {4}), Olimpiets (1981 {1}), Metalist (1986, 2005 {2}), SKA/CSKA-2/3 (1988, 1989, 1995/96, 1999, 2000 {5}), Dynamo-3 (1992/93 – 1994/95, 1996/97 {4}), Krai (1992/93, 1993/94 {2}), Obolon-Zmina/Obolon-2 (1993/94, 1994/95, 1998/99, 2013 {4}), Olimpik (1993/94, 1994/95 {2}), Interkas (1997/98, 1998/99 {2}), Dnipro (1999 – 2003 {5}), Zirka (2008 {1}), KNTEU (2009 {1}), Rubikon (2017/18 – 2019/20 {3}), Atlet (2019/20 – 2024/25 {6}), Yednist (2020/21, 2021/22 {2}), Livyi Bereh (2020/21 {1}), Akademia Futbolu (2020/21 {1}), OC imeni Piddubnoho (2021/22 {1}), UCSA (2021/22 {1}), Rebel (2024/25 {1})
Kyiv Oblast	Spartak Bila Tserkva (1964 {1}), Avtotraktordetal Bila Tserkva (1965 {1}), Lokomotyv Fastiv (1966, 1982 {2}), Avtomobilist Bila Tserkva (1967, 1969, 1970 {3}), Avanhard Bila Tserkva (1968 {1}), FC Irpin (1971, 1972 {2}), **Refryzherator Fastiv** (1974 – 1981, 1987 – 1989, 1991, 1997/98 – 1999 {15}), Shynnyk Bila Tserkva (1976 {1}), Kolos Borodianka (1977 {1}), Budivelnyk Borodianka (1978 {1}), Rubin Piskivka (1978 – 1980 {3}), Krystal Yahotyn (1979 – 1981 {3}), Mashynobudivnyk/Hart Borodianka (1981, 1983, 1984, 1986, 1988 – 1992/93 {9}), Budivelnyk Prypiat/Slavutych (1981 – 1985, 1987, 1988, 1994/95, 1998/99 {9}), Dynamo Irpin (1983 {1}), Silmash Bila Tserkva (1985 {1}), Zoria Obukhiv (1987 {1}), Nyva Myronivka (1989 – 1991, 1996/97 {4}), Ahro-Blyskavka Baryshivka (1990, 1991, 1993/94 {3}), Fakel Fastiv (1990 {1}), Budivelnyk Ivankiv (1991, 1992/93 {2}), Promin Bila Tserkva (1991 {1}), Budivelnyk Brovary (1993/94 – 1996/97 {4}), Transimpeks Vyshneve (1993/94 {1}), Katekh Irpin (1994/95 {1}), UFEI Irpin (1997/98 – 2000 {4}), Dinaz Vyshhorod (2000, 2011, 2018/19 {3}), KLO Bucha (2003 {1}), Hran Buzova (2006 {1}), Antares Obukhiv (2007 {1}), Arsenal Bila Tserkva (2007 {1}), Zenit Boyarka (2008, 2009 {2}), Irpin Horenychi (2009 {1}), FC Putrivka (2011 {1}), FC Volodarka (2012 {1}), LKT Slavutych (2013 {1}), Kolos Kovalivka (2014, 2015 {2}), Chaika Petropavlivska-Borshchahivka (2016 – 2017/18 {3}), Chaika Vyshhorod (2018/19 {1}), Avanhard Bziv (2018/19 {1}), FC Bila Tserkva (2019/20 – 2021/22 {3}), Liubomyr Stavyshche (2020/21 {1}), Nyva Buzova (2021/22 {1}), Druzhba Myrivka (2022/23 {1}), Shturm Ivankiv (2022/23, 2023/24 {2}), Sokil Mykhailivka-Rubezhivka (2023/24, 2024/25 {2}), FC Lisne (2024/25 {1}), Mriya Hostomel (2024/25 {1})
Kirovohrad Oblast	Dnipro KremHES (1964 {1}), Spartak Kirovohrad (1965, 1967, 1968, 1974 {4}), Aviator Kirovohrad (1966 {1}), **Lokomotyv Znamianka** (1969, 1970, 1973, 1974, 1976, 1978 – 1983, 1985 – 1988, 1992/93 – 1998/99 {22}), **Shakhtar Oleksandria** (1971 – 1985, 1988 – 1990 {18}), Avanhard Svitlovodsk (1971 – 1973 {3}), **Radyst Kirovohrad** (1975 – 1984, 1986 – 1988, 1990 {14}), Yatran Kirovohrad (1979, 1980 {2}), Khimik Kirovohrad (1989 {1}), Polihraftekhnika/Polihraftekhnika-2/Krystal Oleksandria (1991, 1992/93, 1994/95 {3}), Kolos Oleksandrivka (1991 {1}), Krasnobudivnyk Oleksandria (1992/93 {1}), Sotel Kirovohrad (1996/97 {1}), Herkules Novoukrainka (1998/99, 2000, 2001 {3}), Ikar Kirovohrad (1998/99, 2002, 2003 {3}), Artemida Kirovohrad (2000 {1}), Mekhanizator Kamyshuvate (2001 {1}), Zirka Kirovohrad (2007, 2019/20 – 2024/25 {7}), Olimpik Kirovohrad (2007, 2009 – 2012, 2014, 2017/18 – 2019/20 {9}), Ametyst Oleksandria (2008 {1}), UkrAhroKom Holovkivka (2010, 2011 {2}), Burevisnyk Petrove (2013, 2014 {2}), Inhulets/Inhulets-2/Inhulets-3 Petrove (2014, 2015, 2016, 2016/17 {4}), Ahrotekh Tyshkivka (2023/24 – 2026/27 {4})
Lviv Oblast	**LVVPU Lviv** (1964, 1965, 1969, 1971, 1972, 1977 – 1979, 1985, 1986 {10}), Khimik Novyi Rozdil (1966, 1977, 1978 {3}), Vymiriuvach Lviv (1967 {1}), Avanhard Boryslav (1968 {1}), **Sokil Lviv** (1970 – 1982, 1992/93 – 1994/95 {16}), [Tsementnyk] Mykolaiv (1970, 1971, 1973, 1974, 1980, 1984, 1987, 1996/97 {8}), Avanhard/Skala 1911 Stryi (1971 – 1973, 2022/23 {4}), Dolotnyk Drohobych (1972 {1}), SKA Lviv (1973 – 1976 {4}), Torpedo Drohobych (1973 {1}), Kolos Khodoriv (1975 {1}), Shakhtar Chervonohrad (1977 – 1980, 1982, 1990, 1992/93 – 1994/95 {9}), Khimik Drohobych (1979 – 1981 {3}), Khimik Sokal (1981 {1}), Zoria Kernytsia (1981 {1}), Spartak Sambir (1983, 1985, 1986, 1989 – 1991 {6}), Avtomobilist Lviv (1983, 1984, 1988, 1989 {4}), Kolos Zastavne (1986, 1987 {2}), Zirka Lviv (1987 {1}), Avanhard Drohobych (1988 {1}), Avanhard Zhydachiv (1988, 1989 {2}), Karpaty Kamianka-Buzka (1989, 1990 {2}), Hirnyk Novoyavorivsk (1990, 1992/93 – 1994/95 {4}), Hazovyk Komarno (1991 {1}), Promin Sambir (1991, 1994/95, 1996/97, 1997/98, 2011 {5}), LAZ Lviv (1993/94 {1}), Medyk Morshyn (1994/95, 1996/97 {2}), Haray Zhovkva (1994/95 {1}), Yavir Yavoriv (1995/96 {1}), Dynamo Lviv (1998/99 {1}), Naftovyk Boryslav (2000 {1}), SKA-Orbita Lviv (2001 {1}), Rava Rava-Ruska (2003 {1}), Rozdillia Novyi Rozdil (2004 {1}), Sokil Sukhovolia (2006 {1}), Halychyna Lviv (2007 {1}), Sokil Zolochiv (2008 {1}), FC Morshyn (2009 {1}), Rukh Vynnyky (2013 – 2015 {3}), Opir Lviv (2015 {1}), Rochyn Sosnivka (2016 – 2018/19 {4}), FC Lviv (2016/17 {1}), Karpaty Lviv (2020/21 {1}), Yunist Verkhnia Bilka (2020/21, 2021/22 {2}), Feniks Pidmonastyr (2021/22, 2023/24, 2024/25 {3}), Kulykiv-Bilka (2022/23, 2023/24 {2}), FC Mykolaiv (2024/25 – 2026/27 {3}), Kormil Yavoriv (2025/26, 2026/27 {2})
Luhansk Oblast	Shakhtar Krasnyi Luch (1964, 1981, 1991, 1996/97 {4}), Shakhtar Lysychansk (1965, 1970 – 1972, 1980 {5}), **Avanhard Rovenky** (1966, 1967, 1980 – 1986, 1990 – 1993/94 {13}), Shakhtar Kirovsk (1968, 1969 {2}), Shakhtar Krasnodon (1970, 1971, 1997/98 {3}), Avanhard Volodarsk (1971 {1}), Shakhtar Brianka (1971, 1972 {2}), Avanhard Antratsyt (1971 – 1973 {3}), **Shakhtar Sverdlovsk** (1971 – 1973, 1977 – 1994/95, 2003, 2006 {23}), **Komunarets Komunarsk** (1972, 1976 – 1979, 1981, 1985 – 1988 {10}), Impuls Severodonetsk (1974 {1}), Shakhtar Stakhanov (1975, 1977 – 1979, 1987 – 1990 {8}), Khimik Rubizhne (1975, 1976, 1980 – 1982 {5}), Khimik Severodonetsk (1979, 1980, 1988 – 1990 {5}), Shakhtar Lutuhine (1987 – 1990 {4}), Stal Alchevsk (1989, 1990 {2}), FC Antratsyt (1991, 1992/93 {2}), Metalurh Lutuhine (1991 – 1993/94 {3}), Aiaks Krasnyi Luch (1992/93 – 1994/95 {3}), Hirnyk Bryanka (1994/95 {1}), Shakhtar Rovenky (1995/96 {1}), Zolote-Almaz Pervomaisk (1998/99 {1}), Shakhtar Luhansk (1999 – 2002 {4}), Fahot Krasnyi Luch (2000 {1}), Ekina Almazna (2001 {1}), Dynamo Stakhanov (2002 {1}), Molnia Severodonetsk (2003 {1}), FC Lysychansk (2011 {1}), FC Popasna (2011 {1})
Mykolaiv Oblast	**Torpedo Mykolaiv** (1964 – 1966, 1974, 2008 – 2014 {11}), Zenit Mykolaiv (1968 {1}), Spartak Mykolaiv (1969, 1970 {2}), Komunarovets Mykolaiv (1970 {1}), Khvylia Mykolaiv (1971, 1973 – 1976, 1978, 1980, 1983, 1984 {9}), Spartak Pervomaisk (1972, 1973 {2}), Okean Mykolaiv (1974 – 1977, 1979 – 1981 {7}), **Vodnyk Mykolaiv** (1976, 1986 – 1992/93, 2002, 2003 {10}), Sudnobudivnyk/Mykolaiv-2 Mykolaiv (1977, 1978, 1985, 1996/97, {4}), **Frehat Pervomaisk** (1977 – 1986, 1989 – 1991 {13}), Iskra Voznesensk (1978 {1}), Budivelnyk Pervomaisk (1981 {1}), Zirka Mykolaiv (1982, 1987ZH {2}), Pervomayets Pervomaisk (1983, 1984 {2}), Iskra Pervomaisk (1988 {1}), Mayak Ochakiv (1989, 1990 {2}), Olimpia AES Yuzhnoukrainsk (1991 – 1994/95 {4}), Kolos Novokrasne (1991, 1992/93 {2}), Nyva Nechaiane (1991, 1993/94, 1994/95 {3}), Kooperator Novyi Buh (1992/93 {1}), Merkuriy Pervomaisk (1993/94, 1994/95 {2}), SC Pervomaisk (1995/96, 1997/98 – 1999 {4}), Sudnobudivnyk Mykolaiv (2016 {1}), Kolos Stepove (1999 – 2003, 2005 {6}), Enerhia Mykolaiv (2013 {1}), Varvarivka Mykolaiv (2014 {1}), FC Vradiivka (2016, 2016/17 {2}), MFC Pervomaisk (2016/17 – 2020/21 {5}), VAST Mykolaiv (2021/22 {1})
Odesa Oblast	Torpedo Odesa (1964, 1966, 1991 – 1994/95 {6}), Syhnal Kotovsk (1965 {1}), Vostannie Tatarbunary (1968, 1970 {2}), Taksomotor Odesa (1969 {1}), Portovyk Illichivsk (1971 – 1978 {8}), Hvardiets Odesa (1974 {1}), Shtorm Odesa (1975 {1}), Kolos Tatarbunary (1977 {1}), Zavod Oktiabrskoy Revoliutsii Odesa (1979, 1985 {2}), Sudnoremontnyk Illichivsk (1979 – 1982, 1984, 1987 – 1989 {8}), Suvorovets Izmail (1981 – 1983 {3}), Kotovsk (1983 {1}), Zirka Odesa (1984 {1}), Illichivets Illichivsk (1985 {1}), Dynamo Odesa (1986 – 1991, 1994/95 {7}), Portovyk Izmail (1986 {1}), Dunaets Izmail (1989 {1}), Vodnyk Illichivsk (1990 {1}), Khvylia Illichivsk (1991 {1}), Blaho Blahoyeve (1992/93 – 1995/96 {4}), Enerhia Illichivsk (1992/93 – 1994/95 {3}), Dnistrovets Bilhorod-Dnistrovskyi (1991 – 1993/94, 2001 {4}), Bryz Izmail (1992/93 – 1994/95, 2006, 2007 {5}), Birzula Kotovsk (1993/94, 1994/95 {2}), Ren Reni (1994/95 {1}), Dnister Ovidiopol (1998/99 – 2001 {4}), Ivan Odesa (2003 – 2007 {5}), Real Odesa (2003, 2004 {2}), FC Biliaivka (2006 {1}), Bastion/Bastion-2 Illichivsk (2007, 2008, 2009, 2013 {4}), Real Pharma Odesa (2011, 2026/27 {2}), SKAD Bolhrad (2011 {1}), SKA Odesa (2012 {1}), Savinion Tairove (2012 {1}), FC Tarutyne (2012 {1}), Balkany Zoria (2014 – 2016 {3}), Zhemchuzhyna Odesa (2015, 2016 {2}), Tytan Odesa (2023/24, 2024/25 {2}), To4ka Odesa (2025/26 {1})
Poltava Oblast	Sputnik Poltava (1964, 1967, 1969, 1970, 1978 – 1980 {7}), Avanhard Pryluky (1964, 1967, 1969, 1974 {4}), Avanhard Kremenchuk (1965 {1}), Vahonobudivnyk Kremenchuk (1966, 1968, 1970, 1971, 1992/93, 1993/94 {6}), Promin Poltava (1972 – 1977 {6}), Dnipro Kremenchuk (1976 {1}), Burevisnyk Poltava (1977, 1978 {2}), Naftovyk Kremenchuk (1980 – 1982, 1989 – 1991 {6}), Lokomotyv Poltava (1981, 1982, 1993/94 {3}), Kooperator Poltava (1983 {1}), Avtomobilist Poltava (1983 {1}), Vorskla Poltava (1984 – 1986 {3}), Naftovyk Karlivka (1984 {1}), Sula Lubny (1985, 1987 – 1993/94, 1998/99 {9}), Kremin/Kremin-Yuniors Kremenchuk (1986 – 1988, 1999, 2004, 2019/20 {6}), Naftovyk Pyriatyn (1987 – 1990 {4}), Trud Karlivka (1989 {1}), Zoria Karlivka (1990, 1991 {2}), Hirnyk Komsomolsk (1991 – 1994/95 {4}), Lokomotyv Hrebinka (1994/95, 1995/96 {2}), Kremez Kremenchuk (2000, 2002 {2}), FC Myrhorod (2000 {1}), Naftovyk Hadiach (2002 {1}), FC Velyka Bahachka (2006, 2007 {2}), Nove Zhyttia Andriivka (2011 – 2013 {3}), Olimpia Savyntsi (2020/21 – 2026/27 {7}), SC Poltava (2020/21 {1}), Standart Novi Sanzhary (2024/25, 2025/26 {2}), FC Rokyta (2025/26, 2026/27 {2}), Budivelnyk Kremenchuk (2026/27 {1})
Rivne Oblast	Tekstylnyk Rivne (1964 – 1966 {3}), Horyn Dubrovytsia (1969 {1}), Torpedo Rivne (1970 – 1976, 1978 {8}), Sluch Berezne (1976, 1979, 1980, 1989, 1990 {5}), Vodnyk Rivne (1979 {1}), Budivelnyk Kuznetsovsk (1980 – 1983 {4}), Maiak Sarny (1981, 1982, 2014, 2021/22, 2025/26, 2026/27 {6}), Horyn Rivne (1984 {1}), Izotop Kuznetsovsk (1986 – 1989, 1993/94, 1994/95, 1996/97 {7}), Spartak Dubne (1988 {1}), Zoria Rivne (1990, 1991 {2}), Bofik Karpylivka (1990 {1}), Ikva Mlyniv (1991, 2002, 2003 {3}), Lokomotyv Rivne (1992/93 {1}), Sokil Radyvyliv (1995/96, 1997/98, 2000, 2001 {4}), Khimik Rivne (1997/98 – 1999 {3}), Metalist Zdolbuniv (1998/99 – 2001 {4}), Lokomotyv Zdolbuniv (2002, 2003 {2}), Volyn-Tsement Zdolbuniv (2004 – 2008 {5}), **ODEK Orzhiv** (2004, 2005, 2007 – 2021/22 {18}), Torpedo Kostopil (2004 {1}), FC Malynsk (2016 – 2019/20 {5}), Kobra Ostroh (2018/19 {1}), FC Kostopil (2025/26, 2026/27 {2})
Sumy Oblast	Elektron Romny (1964, 1988 – 1991, 1995/96, 1996/97 {7}), Shakhtar Konotop (1965, 1969 {2}), Spartak Krolevets (1966 {1}), Kharchovyk Sumy (1967 {1}), Sumy Oblast (1968 {1}), Khimik Shostka (1970, 1977 {2}), **Frunzenets Sumy** (1971 – 1974, 1979, 1980, 1986, 1988, 1999, 2000 {10}), Svema Shostka (1974, 1975, 1978, 1994/95 {4}), **Naftovyk/Naftovyk-2 Okhtyrka** (1982 – 1985, 1992/93 – 1994/95, 2002, 2003, 2021/22 – 2023/24, 2025/26, 2026/27 {14}), Lyvarnyk Sumy (1983, 1984 {2}), Yavir Krasnopillia (1985 – 1987, 1989 – 1991, 2001, 2002 {8}), Avtomobilist Sumy (1987, 1990 {2}), Khimik Bezdryk (1988, 1989 {2}), Mayak Sumy (1989 {1}), Khimik Sumy (1990, 1991 {2}), Spartak Hlukhiv (1990 {1}), Viktoria Lebedyn (1991 {1}), Budivelnyk Sumy (1991 – 1994/95 {4}), Esman Hlukhiv (1992/93 {1}), Slovianets Konotop (1992/93, 1993/94, 1996/97, 1998/99, 2006 {5}), Kharchovyk Popivka (1993/94, 1994/95, 1996/97 – 1998/99 {5}), Barsa Sumy (2013 {1}), Viktoria Mykolaivka (2016/17 – 2020/21 {5}), Ahrobiznes Romny (2017/18 {1}), Alians Lypova Dolyna (2018/19 {1}), FC Trostianets (2019/20, 2020/21 {2}), FC Sumy (2020/21 {1})
Ternopil Oblast	Druzhba Chortkiv (1964 {1}), Kolhospnyk Berezhany (1965 {1}), Kolos Buchach (1966 – 1973 {8}), Mayak Berezhany (1969 {1}), Avtomobilist Kopychentsi (1974, 1985 {2}), Dnister Zalishchyky (1975, 1976, 1986, 1991, 2024/25, 2025/26 {6}), Burevisnyk Ternopil (1975 – 1978 {4}), Kombainobudivnyk Ternopil (1976, 1977, 1981 {3}), Budivelnyk Monastyryska (1977 {1}), Elektron Zbarazh (1978, 1979 {2}), Vatra Ternopil (1978 – 1980, 1982, 1983 {5}), Nyva Berezhany/Pidhaitsi (1979 – 1982 {4}), **Sokil Berezhany/Pidhaitsi** (1984 – 1991, 1993/94, 2001, 2002, 2004, 2005, 2007, 2008 {15}), Zoria Khorostkiv (1980, 1981, 1992/93 – 1997/98 {8}), Druzhba Zbarazh (1981, 1984 {2}), Krystal Chortkiv (1986 – 1991, 2016/17 – 2018/19 {9}), Kolos Zboriv (1990, 1991 {2}), Zbruch Borshchiv (1991 {1}), Start Kozova (1992/93 {1}), Medobory Husiatyn (1992/93 {1}), Nyva Terebovlia (1997/98, 2016/17, 2017/18, 2019/20 – 2021/22 {6}), Sokil Velyki Hayi (1999, 2000 {2}), FC Ternopil (2010, 2012, 2018/19 {3}), Topilche Ternopil (2010 {1}), Nyva Ternopil (2016, 2016/17 {2}), Ahron Velyki Hayi (2018/19 – 2026/27 {9}), Podoliany Ternopil (2023/24 {1}), Halych Zbarazh (2024/25 {1}), FC Borshchiv (2026/27 {1})
Vinnytsia Oblast	Burevisnyk Vinnytsia (1964, 1966 {2}), Vostok Mohyliv-Podilskyi (1965 {1}), Kolos Bar (1968 {1}), Avtomonilist Khmilnyk (1970 {1}), Kharchovyk Vinnytsia (1971, 1973 {2}), Avanhard Vinnytsia (1974 – 1977 {4}), Intehral Vinnytsia (1978 – 1981, 1983, 1988, 1991, 1992/93 {8}), **Sokil Haisyn** (1981 – 1990 {10}), Temp Vinnytsia (1982, 1984, 1985 {3}), Kolos Serbria (1986, 1987 {2}), OLKAR Sharhorod (1989 – 1992/93, 2007 {5}), Podillia Kyrnasivka (1990, 1992/93, 1994/95 {3}), Avanhard Ladyzhyn (1991 {1}), Santa-Maria Kryzhopil (1993/94 {1}), Avanhard Kryzhopil (1994/95 {1}), Svitanok Vinnytsia (1995/96 {1}), Kirovets Mohyliv-Podilskyi (1998/99 – 2000 {3}), Nyva Hnivan (2001 {1}), Dovira-Nyva Vinnytsia (2003 {1}), FC Bershad (2004 {1}), Nyva Vinnytsia (2006, 2016 {2}), Avanhard Sutysky (2007 {1}), Horyzont Koziatyn (2008, 2009 {2}), FC Vinnytsia (2013 – 2016 {4}), Fakel Lypovets (2017/18, 2018/19, 2022/23 {3}), Svitanok-Ahrosvit Shliakhova (2019/20 {1}), FC Bratslav (2025/26 {1})
Volyn Oblast	Lokomotyv Kovel (1964, 1967, 1969, 1972 {4}), Shakhtar Novovolynsk (1965, 1966, 1972, 1977, 1992/93 – 1994/95 {7}), Elektryk Lutsk (1968 {1}), Mekhanizator Rozhyshche (1970 {1}), Torpedo Lutsk (1971 {1}), **Silmash Kovel** (1973 – 1976, 1980 – 1985, 1992/93 – 1994/95 {13}), Prylad Lutsk (1978, 1979 {2}), Spetstekhobl Novovolynsk (1981 {1}), Kolos Kivertsi (1982, 1983 {2}), Pidshypnyk Lutsk (1986 – 1992/93, 1994/95 {8}), ENKO Lutsk (1995/96 {1}), Dynamo Manevychi (1996/97 {1}), Volyn-2 Lutsk (1997/98 {1}), Troianda-Ekspres Hirka Polonka (1998/99 {1}), Yavir Tsuman (1998/99, 2001 {2}), FC Kovel (2000, 2001, 2016/17, 2019/20 {4}), LDPU Lutsk (2003 {1}), BRW-WIK Volodymyr-Volynskyi (2008 {1}), FC Lutsk (2016, 2016/17 {2}), Votrans Lutsk (2019/20, 2020/21 {2}), LSTM 536 Lutsk (2019/20, 2022/23, 2026/27 {3}), FC Trostianets (2025/26, 2026/27 {2})
Zakarpattia Oblast	Budivelnyk Khust (1964, 1965, 1969, 1970 {4}), Meblevyk Khust (1966 {1}), Pryladyst Mukachevo (1967, 1971, 1972, 1975 – 1977, 1988 – 1990 {9}), Kooperator Berehovo (1970 – 1973 {4}), Latorytsia Mukachevo (1971 – 1973 {3}), Shakhtar Ilnytsia (1973 {1}), DOK Vylok (1974 {1}), Raduvanka Uzhhorod (1976 {1}), Dynamo Uzhhorod (1976 {1}), Urozhai Kolchyno (1977 – 1981, 1984 {6}), Plastyk Vynohradovo (1977 {1}), Karpaty Bushtyno (1979 – 1981 {3}), Kolos Velyki Luchky (1980 {1}), Fetrovyk Khust (1981, 1983, 1988 – 1991 {6}), Metalist Irshava (1982 {1}), Avanhard Svaliava (1984 {1}), Karpaty Dubove (1984 {1}), Keramik Mukachevo (1985, 1986 {2}), Keramik Vynohradovo (1991 {1}), Aval Dovhe (1992/93, 1993/94 {2}), Yalynka Velykyi Bychkiv (1992/93 – 1994/95 {3}), Elektron Volovets (1993/94, 1994/95 {2}), Lokomotyv Chop (1994/95 {1}), Karpaty Rakhiv (1995/96 {1}), Berkut Bedevlia (1996/97 {1}), Verkhovyna Mizhhiria (1997/98 {1}), FC Mynai (2017/18 {1}), FC Uzhhorod (2018/19 {1}), MFA Mukachevo (2020/21 {1}), Vilkhivtsi (2023/24 {1}), Maramuresh Nyzhnia Apsha (2023/24 {1})
Zaporizhzhia Oblast	Strila Zaporizhzhia (1964 – 1966, 1972, 1974, 1975 {6}), Tytan Zaporizhzhia (1967, 1968, 1970, 1971 {4}), Meteor Zaporizhzhia (1969 {1}), Torpedo Melitopol (1970, 1985 – 1991 {8}), Torpedo Berdiansk (1971, 1988, 1990 {3}), Hirnyk Dniprorudne (1972, 1973 {2}), Iskra Zaporizhzhia (1973 {1}), Komunar Zaporizhzhia (1975 {1}), Azovets Berdiansk (1975, 1977, 1978 {3}), Transformator Zaporizhzhia (1976 – 1983, 1985, 1987, 1990 {9}), Enerhia Berdiansk (1979, 1980, 1989, 1991 – 1993/94, 1995/96 {7}), Spartak Melitopol (1979 {1}), Avtomobilist Zaporizhzhia (1980, 1981, 1983 {3}), Azovkabel Berdiansk (1981 {1}), Avanhard Zaporizhzhia (1982 {1}), Torpedo Zaporizhzhia (1983, 1984 {2}), Khimik Zaporizhzhia (1984 {1}), Krystal Zaporizhzhia (1986 {1}), Olimpiets Prymorsk (1988 – 1991 {4}), Druzhba Osypenko (1991 {1}), Dyzelist Tokmak (1991, 1992/93 {2}), Nyva-Viktor Novomykolaivka (1993/94 {1}), Zirka Zaporizhzhia (1994/95 {1}), Blyskavka Berdiansk (1996/97 {1}), Tavria-Metalurh Prymorsk (1996/97 {1}), Dalis Kamyshuvakha (1997/98 {1}), ZAlK Zaporizhzhia (2000 – 2003, 2005 {5}), ZIDMU Zaporizhzhia (2004, 2005 {2}), Illich Osypenko (2008 {1}), Tavria-Skif Rozdol (2015 – 2017/18 {4}), Metalurh Zaporizhzhia (2016 {1}), Metalurh Zaporizhzhia/Metalurh-2 (2017/18, 2020/21, 2021/22 {3}), Motor Zaporizhzhia (2018/19 – 2022/23 {5}), OSDYuShOR Zaporizhzhia (2021/22 {1}), IRON Zaporizhia (2026/27 {1})
Zhytomyr Oblast	**Prohres Berdychiv** (1964 – 1966, 1978, 1979, 1983, 1985 – 1991 {13}), Avanhard Novohrad-Volynskyi (1967, 2011, 2013 {3}), Enerhetyk Zhytomyr (1968 {1}), Avanhard Malyn (1969 {1}), Shkirianyk Berdychiv (1970, 1977, 1978, 1980, 1992/93 {5}), Elektrovymiriuvach Zhytomyr (1970 – 1972, 1974 – 1976, 1979, 1981, 1982 {9}), Lokomotyv Korosten (1973 {1}), Torpedo Zhytomyr (1977 {1}), Papirnyk Malyn (1983 – 1987, 1990, 1995/96 {7}), Zirka Zhytomyr (1986 – 1988 {3}), Zirka Chudniv (1989 {1}), Khimmash Korosten (1989, 2006, 2010 {3}), Khimik-Krok Zhytomyr (1990, 1991 {2}), Keramik Baranivka (1990 – 1993/94 {4}), Fortuna Andrushivka (1992/93 {1}), Polissia Korosten (1993/94 {1}), Budivelnyk Zhytomyr (1996/97 {1}), Berd Berdychiv (1996/97 {1}), KKhP Cherniakhiv (1997/98 – 2002 {6}), Tytan Irshansk (2001 {1}), SC Korosten (2004, 2011 {2}), Metalurh Malyn (2006 – 2008, 2011 {4}), Polissia-2 Zhytomyr (2008 {1}), Zviahel-750 Novohrad-Volynskyi (2010 {1}), Arsenal Zhytomyr (2011 {1}), Lehion Zhytomyr (2012, 2014 {2}), Mal Korosten (2015 {1}), MFC Zhytomyr (2016, 2016/17 {2}), Zviahel Novohrad-Volynskyi (2021/22 {1}), Vivad Romaniv (2023/24 – 2026/27 {4}), Korosten/Ahro-Nyva (2025/26 {1})

== See also ==
- Ukrainian Amateur Cup
- Football Championship of the Ukrainian SSR
