= 1965 Football Cup of Ukrainian SSR among KFK =

1965 Ukrainian Amateur Cup
Tournament details
- Country: Soviet Union (Ukrainian SSR)

Final positions
- Champions: FC Tytan Zaporizhia
- Runners-up: LVVPU Lviv

The 1965 Football Cup of Ukrainian SSR among KFK was the annual season of Ukraine's football knockout competition for amateur football teams.

== Competition schedule ==
=== Preliminary round ===
Team 1	Score	Team 2
FC Tekstylnyk Dunaivtsi	2–1	FC Shakhtar Korostyshiv
m/u Ostroh	2–6	FC Spartak Lutsk
FC Sokol Uman	2–1	FC Avanhard Kryukiv
FC Enerhiya Nova Kakhovka	0–1	FC Torpedo Mykolaiv
FC Kolhospnyk Buchach	-/+	FC Karpaty Broshniv
FC Voskhod Chernivtsi	0–0	FC Plasmasovyk Vynohradiv

Replay

Team 1	Score	Team 2
FC Voskhod Chernivtsi	2–3	FC Plasmasovyk Vynohradiv

Notes:

- The match between Kolhospnyk Buchach and Karpaty Borshniv ended in 2–0 win by Buchach.

=== First qualification round ===
Team 1	Score	Team 2
FC Start Chuhuiv	2–1	FC Shakhtar Konotop
FC Tekstylnyk Dunaivtsi	+/-	"no show" (Odesa Oblast)
FC Spartak Lutsk	1–2	FC Tytan Zaporizhia
FC Bilshovyk Kyiv	1–3	FC Spartak Kirovohrad
FC Temp Bila Tserkva	1–3	FC Avanhard Ordzhonikidze
FC Torpedo Mykolaiv	1–0	FC Avanhard Kerch
LVVPU Lviv	10–2	FC Karpaty Broshniv
FC Plasmasovyk Vynohradiv	1–2	FC Zirka Oster
FC Avanhard Rovenky	2–1	FC Vostok Mohyliv-Podilskyi
FC Start Dzerzhynsk	4–1	FC Sokol Uman

=== Second qualification round ===
Team 1	Score	Team 2
FC Start Chuhuiv	2–1	FC Tekstylnyk Dunaivtsi
FC Tytan Zaporizhia	2–1	FC Spartak Kirovohrad
FC Avanhard Ordzhonikidze	1–0	FC Torpedo Mykolaiv
FC Zirka Oster	1–6	LVVPU Lviv
FC Avanhard Rovenky	3–1	FC Start Dzerzhynsk

=== Quarterfinals (1/4) ===
Team 1	Score	Team 2
LVVPU Lviv	1–0	FC Avanhard Rovenky

=== Semifinals (1/2) ===
Team 1	Score	Team 2
FC Start Chuhuiv	3–3	LVVPU Lviv
FC Tytan Zaporizhia	1–0	FC Avanhard Ordzhonikidze

Replay

Team 1	Score	Team 2
FC Start Chuhuiv	0–3	LVVPU Lviv

=== Final ===
Team 1	Score	Team 2
FC Tytan Zaporizhia	2–1	LVVPU Lviv

== See also ==
- 1965 KFK competitions (Ukraine)
