= 1966 KFK competitions (Ukraine) =

KFK competitions
- Season: 1966
- Champions: Metalist Sevastopol

The 1966 KFK competitions in Ukraine were part of the 1966 Soviet KFK competitions that were conducted in the Soviet Union. It was third season of the KFK in Ukraine since its introduction in 1964.

== First stage ==
=== Group 1 ===
Pos	Team	Pld	W	D	L	GF	GA	GD	Pts	Qualification
1	Metalurh Sevastopol	8	7	1	0	11	6	+5	15	Advanced to Final
2	Enerhiya Nova Kakhovka	8	6	1	1	16	4	+12	13	
3	Avanhard Kerch	8	2	0	6	4	7	−3	4	
4	Strila Zaporizhia	8	2	0	6	1	6	−5	4	
5	Torpedo Mykolaiv	8	2	0	6	1	10	−9	4	

Source: ukr-football.org.ua

=== Group 2 ===
Pos	Team	Pld	W	D	L	GF	GA	GD	Pts	Qualification
1	Prohres Berdychiv	8	4	2	2	16	8	+8	10	Advanced to Final
2	Mashzavod Nizhyn	8	3	3	2	17	14	+3	9	
3	Burevisnyk Kamianets-Podilskyi	8	2	3	3	9	6	+3	7	
4	Tekstylnyk Rivne	8	1	5	2	7	11	−4	7	
5	Lokomotyv Fastiv	8	2	3	3	7	17	−10	7	

Source: ukr-football.org.ua

=== Group 3 ===
Pos	Team	Pld	W	D	L	GF	GA	GD	Pts	Qualification
1	Kolhospnyk Buchach	8	6	1	1	13	5	+8	13	Advanced to Final
2	Khimik Novyi Rozdil	8	5	2	1	13	5	+8	12	
3	Meblevyk Khust	8	2	2	4	8	7	+1	6	
4	Naftovyk Dolyna	8	3	0	5	5	8	−3	6	
5	Shakhtar Novovolynsk	8	1	1	6	3	17	−14	3	

Source: ukr-football.org.ua

Notes:

- Meblevyk Khust replaced last season Budivelnyk Khust

=== Group 4 ===
Pos	Team	Pld	W	D	L	GF	GA	GD	Pts	Qualification
1	Khimik Sloviansk	6	3	2	1	14	11	+3	8	Advanced to Final
2	Aviator Kirovohrad	6	2	3	1	11	8	+3	7	
3	Avanhard Terny	6	2	2	2	11	11	0	6	
4	Lokomotyv Smila	6	0	3	3	10	16	−6	3	

Source: ukr-football.org.ua

Notes:

- Aviator Kirovohrad replaced last season Spartak Kirovohrad

=== Group 5 ===
Pos	Team	Pld	W	D	L	GF	GA	GD	Pts	Qualification
1	Avanhard Kryukiv	6	3	3	0	12	5	+7	9	Advanced to Final
2	Avanhard Rovenky	6	3	3	0	8	5	+3	9	
3	Start Chuhuiv	6	1	2	3	9	10	−1	4	
4	Spartak Krolevets	6	1	0	5	7	16	−9	2	

Source: ukr-football.org.ua

Notes:

- Last season Avanhard Kryukiv played as Avanhard Kremenchuk

=== Group 6 ===
Pos	Team	Pld	W	D	L	GF	GA	GD	Pts	Qualification
1	Burevisnyk Vinnytsia	6	3	3	0	10	2	+8	9	Advanced to Final
2	Torpedo Odesa	6	2	4	0	3	1	+2	8	
3	Mashzavod Chernivtsi	6	2	3	1	8	5	+3	7	
4	Khimik Kyiv	6	0	0	6	4	17	−13	0	

Source: ukr-football.org.ua

== Final ==
Final stage was taking place on 29 October – 4 November 1966 in city of Buchach.

Pos	Team	Pld	W	D	L	GF	GA	GD	Pts
1	Metalist Sevastopol	5	5	0	0	12	3	+9	10
2	Kolhospnyk Buchach	5	4	0	1	12	4	+8	8
3	Avanhard Kryukiv	5	2	1	2	5	6	−1	5
4	Khimik Slovyansk	5	2	0	3	4	6	−2	4
5	Prohres Berdychiv	5	1	1	3	6	12	−6	3
6	Burevisnyk Vinnytsia	5	0	0	5	3	11	−8	0

Source: regional-football.ru

== Promotion ==
None of KFK teams were promoted to the 1967 Ukrainian Class B.

- None

However, to the Class B were promoted following teams that did not participate in the KFK competitions:

- FC Stal Dnipropetrovsk
- FC Sitall Kostiantynivka
