= FC Shakhtar Kirovsk =

FC Shakhtar Kirovsk was a football team based in Holubivka (Kirovsk), Ukrainian SSR.

== History ==
The club appeared sometime in 1962. In 1970 Shakhtar was admitted to the Class B competitions.

== Honors ==
Ukrainian championship for collective teams of physical culture

- Winners (1): 1969

Luhansk Oblast football championship

- Winners (1): 1968

== Coaches ==
- 1968–1969 Leonid Porosenkov

== League and cup history ==
Season	Div.	Pos.	Pl.	W	D	L	GS	GA	P	Domestic Cup	Europe	Notes
1968	Rep	2/_{4}										
1969	Rep	1/_{4}	6	5	1	0	7	2	11			Finals
1969	Rep	1/_{6}	5	3	2	0	8	1	8			Admitted
1970	3rd (lower)	19/_{27}	40	15	11	14	34	47	41			tier disbanded
