= FC Shakhtar Konotop =

Ukrainian amateur football club

FC Shakhtar Konotop is a Ukrainian amateur football club from Konotop, Sumy Oblast.

The club was formed back in 1953 and competed mostly at regional competitions. The team originally represented the Konotop Engineering Factory "Chervonyi Metalist" that manufactured the mining equipment, hence the name for the club "Shakhtar" - Miner. In 1968 they became the champion of Sumy Oblast for the first time. In 1965 and 1969 Shakhtar were winners of the Sumy Oblast cup competitions (single elimination tournament). On couple of occasions Shakhtar appeared in the Ukrainian Amateur Football Championship in 1965 and 1969 and earlier in the Football Championship of the Ukrainian SSR in 1958 and 1959. In 1977 they were dissolved.

In 2000 the team was revived back again and became the regional champion in 2001. In 2012 Shakhtar became regional champions for the 7th time.

It continues to play in the Sumy Oblast Championship.

== See also ==
- Football Federation of Sumshchyna
