= Yarchuk =

Yarchuk is a Ukrainian surname. Notable people with this surname include:

- Artem Yarchuk (1990–2011), Russian professional ice hockey winger
- Dmytro Yarchuk (born 1994), Ukrainian amateur footballer
- Efim Yarchuk (1882–1937) Ukrainian-Jewish anarcho-syndicalist
