= FC Metalist Sevastopol =

Ukrainian football team

FC Metalist Sevastopol (Futbol′nyy klub Metalist Sevastopol) was a football team based in Sevastopol, Ukrainian SSR.

== History ==
The club appeared sometime after 1954 and existed until mid 1980s. The club represented the ship repair yard "Metalist" located in Balaklava.

== Honors ==
Ukrainian championship for collective teams of physical culture (Soviet Lower League Tier)

1965, 1966

Crimean Oblast football championship (Soviet Lower League Tier)

1961, 1965, 1966, 1982

== League and cup history (Soviet Union) ==
Season	Div.	Pos.	Pl.	W	D	L	GS	GA	P	Domestic Cup	Europe	Notes
1965	4th KFK Ukrainian SSR Gr. 1	1_{/5}	8	6	0	2	15	6	12			Final (1st, Winners)
1966	4th KFK Ukrainian SSR Gr. 1	1_{/5}	8	7	1	0	11	6	15			Final (1st, Winners)
1967	4th KFK Ukrainian SSR Gr. ?	...										Final (6th)
...
1970	5th KFK Ukrainian SSR Gr. 3	3_{/8}	14	7	1	6	12	12	15			

== Coaches ==
- 1962–1963 Pavel Sklyarov
- 1965–1966 Anatoliy Zakharov
- 1975–1978 Anatoliy Dyomin
- 1979–1982 Vladimir Golubev

== See also ==
- FC Sudnostroitel Sevastopol
