= 1967 KFK competitions (Ukraine) =

KFK competitions
- Season: 1967
- Champions: Avanhard Rovenky

The 1967 KFK competitions in Ukraine were part of the 1967 Soviet KFK competitions that were conducted in the Soviet Union. It was 4th season of the KFK in Ukraine since its introduction in 1964.

== First stage ==
=== Group 1 ===
- Metalist Sevastopol
- Tekstylnyk Kherson
- Zenit Mykolaiv
- Avanhard Kerch
- Molot Yevpatoria

=== Group 2 ===
- Pryladyst Mukacheve
- Khimik Kalush
- Lokomotyv Kovel
- Vymiryuvach Lviv

=== Group 3 ===
- Avanhard Rovenky
- Kharchovyk Sumy
- Lokomotyv Kupyansk
- Suputnyk Poltava

=== Group 4 ===
- Kolhospnyk Buchach
- Avanhard Pryluky
- Podillia Kamianets-Podilskyi
- Avtomobilist Bila Tserkva
- Avanhard Novohrad-Volynskyi

=== Group 5 ===
- Avanhard Vilnohirsk
- Tytan Zaporizhia
- Lokomotyv Smila
- Shakhtar Donetsk (amateurs)
- Spartak Kirovohrad

=== Group 6 ===
- Temp Kyiv
- Kolhospnyk Hayeve (Vinnytsia Oblast)
- Taksomotor Odesa
- Tekstylnyk Rivne
- Vostok Chernivtsi

== Final ==
Final stage was taking place on 24 October – 1 November 1967 in cities of Rovenky and Sverdlovsk.

Pos	Team	Pld	W	D	L	GF	GA	GD	Pts
1	Avanhard Rovenky	5	3	1	1	5	1	+4	7
2	Avanhard Vilnohirsk	5	3	1	1	5	2	+3	7
3	Temp Kyiv	5	2	1	2	7	2	+5	5
4	Kolhospnyk Buchach	5	2	1	2	3	3	0	5
5	Prylad Mukacheve	5	2	1	2	3	8	−5	5
6	Metalist Sevastopol	5	0	1	4	1	8	−7	1

Source: ukr-football.org.ua

First place match: Avanhard Rovenky – Avanhard Vilnohirsk 2–0

== Promotion ==
Three of KFK teams were promoted to the 1968 Ukrainian Class B.

- FC Avanhard Rovenky
- FC Prylad Mukacheve as FC Karpaty Mukachevo
- FC Podillia Kamianets-Podilskyi

Also, to the Class B were promoted following teams that did not participate in the KFK competitions:

- FC Prohres Berdychiv (last season KFK participant)
- FC Shakhtar Chervonohrad
- FC Shakhtar Novovolynsk (last season KFK participant)
- FC Ugolyok Krasnoarmiysk
- FC Shakhtar Sverdlovsk
