= 1970 Ukrainian Class B =

Football Championship of Ukrainian SSR
- Season: 1970
- Champions: Khimik Severodonetsk
- Promoted: 8 clubs
- Relegated: 20 clubs

The 1970 Football Championship of Ukrainian SSR (Class B) was the 40th season of association football competition of the Ukrainian SSR, which was part of the Ukrainian Class B. It was the twentieth and last season in the Soviet Class B and the eighth season of the Ukrainian Class B.

The 1970 Football Championship of Ukrainian SSR (Class B) was won by FC Khimik Severodonetsk.

== Reorganization ==
In 1970–1971 the Soviet football league structure went through reformation. The Soviet Class A introduced an extra tier expanding from two to three in total. To the previous First and Second groups, there was introduced Higher (or Top) group. With this, many clubs that previously competed at the second tier (Second Group) were relegated to lower third tier (Second Group). Because of that, many clubs also moved two tiers either up the league's ladder.

The 1970 Ukrainian Class B season was the last and the Soviet Class B competition were disbanded.

== Teams ==
=== Location map ===
Locations of teams in Class B (Luhansk Oblast only)
Locations of teams in Class B (except Luhansk Oblast)

=== Relegated teams ===
Three clubs were relegated from the 1969 Second Group (Class A).

- FC Lokomotyv Vinnytsia
- FC Khimik Severodonetsk
- FC Dynamo Khmelnytskyi

=== Promoted teams ===
- FC Shakhtar Kirovsk

=== Relocated and renamed teams ===
- none

== Qualification stage ==
=== Zone 1 ===
| Pos | Team | Pld | W | D | L | GF | GA | GD | Pts | Qualification |
|---|---|---|---|---|---|---|---|---|---|---|
| 1 | FC Lokomotyv Vinnytsia | 26 | 15 | 8 | 3 | 36 | 10 | +26 | 38 | Qualified for final stage |
| 2 | FC Dynamo Khmelnytskyi | 26 | 12 | 10 | 4 | 26 | 12 | +14 | 34 | Qualified for final stage |
| 3 | FC Verkhovyna Uzhhorod | 26 | 14 | 6 | 6 | 24 | 13 | +11 | 34 | Qualified for final stage |
| 4 | FC Lokomotyv Donetsk | 26 | 12 | 7 | 7 | 37 | 18 | +19 | 31 | Qualified for final stage |
| 5 | FC Shakhtar Sverdlovsk | 26 | 11 | 9 | 6 | 27 | 17 | +10 | 31 | Qualified for final stage |
| 6 | FC Karpaty Mukacheve | 26 | 11 | 7 | 8 | 30 | 26 | +4 | 29 | Qualified for final stage |
| 7 | FC Avanhard Antratsyt | 26 | 9 | 10 | 7 | 18 | 24 | −6 | 28 | Qualified for final stage |
| 8 | FC Dnipro Cherkasy | 26 | 9 | 8 | 9 | 33 | 32 | +1 | 26 | |
| 9 | FC Torpedo Berdyansk | 26 | 7 | 9 | 10 | 16 | 26 | −10 | 23 | |
| 10 | FC Shakhtar Oleksandriya | 26 | 7 | 8 | 11 | 18 | 29 | −11 | 22 | |
| 11 | FC Podillya Kamianets-Podilskyi | 26 | 7 | 7 | 12 | 19 | 27 | −8 | 21 | |
| 12 | FC Shakhtar Krasnyi Luch | 26 | 7 | 7 | 12 | 13 | 40 | −27 | 21 | |
| 13 | FC Shakhtar Torez | 26 | 5 | 8 | 13 | 9 | 26 | −17 | 18 | |
| 14 | SC Prometei Dniprodzerzhynsk | 26 | 2 | 4 | 20 | 8 | 14 | −6 | 0 (Note: Prometei withdrew after the first half, the rest of its games were counted as technical losses.) | Withdrew |

=== Zone 2 ===
| Pos | Team | Pld | W | D | L | GF | GA | GD | Pts | Qualification |
|---|---|---|---|---|---|---|---|---|---|---|
| 1 | FC Khimik Severodonetsk | 26 | 18 | 8 | 0 | 48 | 10 | +38 | 44 | Qualified for final stage |
| 2 | FC Torpedo Lutsk | 26 | 12 | 9 | 5 | 27 | 17 | +10 | 33 | Qualified for final stage |
| 3 | FC Avanhard Makiivka | 26 | 10 | 10 | 6 | 29 | 26 | +3 | 30 | Qualified for final stage |
| 4 | FC Horyn Rovno | 26 | 8 | 12 | 6 | 30 | 21 | +9 | 28 | Qualified for final stage |
| 5 | FC Avanhard Kramatorsk | 26 | 10 | 7 | 9 | 32 | 34 | −2 | 27 | Qualified for final stage |
| 6 | FC Komunarets Komunarsk | 26 | 10 | 6 | 10 | 24 | 21 | +3 | 26 | Qualified for final stage |
| 7 | FC Avanhard Rovenky | 26 | 9 | 8 | 9 | 25 | 29 | −4 | 26 | Qualified for final stage |
| 8 | FC Shakhtar Chervonohrad | 26 | 8 | 7 | 11 | 23 | 24 | −1 | 23 | |
| 9 | FC Enerhiya Nova Kakhovka | 26 | 9 | 5 | 12 | 29 | 32 | −3 | 23 | |
| 10 | FC Naftovyk Drohobych | 26 | 8 | 6 | 12 | 22 | 34 | −12 | 22 | |
| 11 | FC Avanhard Zhovti Vody | 26 | 7 | 7 | 12 | 19 | 22 | −3 | 21 | |
| 12 | FC Trubnyk Nikopol | 26 | 5 | 11 | 10 | 17 | 25 | −8 | 21 | |
| 13 | FC Shakhtar Kirovsk | 26 | 7 | 7 | 12 | 21 | 38 | −17 | 21 | |
| 14 | SKCF Sevastopol | 26 | 6 | 7 | 13 | 21 | 34 | −13 | 19 | |

== Final stage ==
All points earn by each team were carried over to the final stage.

=== For 1–14 places ===
| Pos | Team | Pld | W | D | L | GF | GA | GD | Pts | Promotion |
|---|---|---|---|---|---|---|---|---|---|---|
| 1 | FC Khimik Severodonetsk (C, P) | 40 | 23 | 15 | 2 | 66 | 20 | +46 | 61 | Promoted |
| 2 | FC Lokomotyv Vinnytsia (P) | 40 | 22 | 15 | 3 | 60 | 17 | +43 | 59 | Promoted |
| 3 | FC Lokomotyv Donetsk (P) | 40 | 23 | 9 | 8 | 66 | 30 | +36 | 55 | Promoted |
| 4 | FC Dynamo Khmelnytskyi (P) | 40 | 19 | 13 | 8 | 49 | 24 | +25 | 51 | Promoted |
| 5 | FC Karpaty Mukacheve | 40 | 19 | 13 | 8 | 51 | 36 | +15 | 51 | |
| 6 | FC Avanhard Antratsyt | 40 | 16 | 14 | 10 | 30 | 33 | −3 | 46 | |
| 7 | FC Verkhovyna Uzhhorod (P) | 40 | 19 | 7 | 14 | 36 | 29 | +7 | 45 | Promoted |
| 8 | FC Torpedo Lutsk (P) | 40 | 15 | 14 | 11 | 35 | 32 | +3 | 44 | Promoted |
| 9 | FC Horyn Rovno (P) | 40 | 14 | 14 | 12 | 48 | 41 | +7 | 42 | Promoted |
| 10 | FC Shakhtar Sverdlovsk | 40 | 13 | 13 | 14 | 35 | 34 | +1 | 39 | |
| 11 | FC Avanhard Makiivka | 40 | 12 | 13 | 15 | 33 | 41 | −8 | 37 | |
| 12 | FC Avanhard Kramatorsk | 40 | 13 | 11 | 16 | 43 | 54 | −11 | 37 | |
| 13 | FC Komunarets Komunarsk | 40 | 13 | 10 | 17 | 38 | 42 | −4 | 36 | |
| 14 | FC Avanhard Rovenky | 40 | 11 | 10 | 19 | 35 | 57 | −22 | 32 | |

(C) Champions; (P) Promoted

=== For 15–27 places ===
| Pos | Team | Pld | W | D | L | GF | GA | GD | Pts | Promotion |
|---|---|---|---|---|---|---|---|---|---|---|
| 15 | FC Dnipro Cherkasy (P) | 40 | 15 | 14 | 11 | 49 | 42 | +7 | 44 | Promoted |
| 16 | FC Avanhard Zhovti Vody | 40 | 15 | 12 | 13 | 34 | 26 | +8 | 42 | |
| 17 | FC Shakhtar Chervonohrad | 40 | 15 | 11 | 14 | 35 | 33 | +2 | 41 | |
| 18 | FC Enerhiya Nova Kakhovka | 40 | 16 | 9 | 15 | 43 | 43 | 0 | 41 | |
| 19 | FC Shakhtar Kirovsk | 40 | 15 | 11 | 14 | 34 | 47 | −13 | 41 | |
| 20 | FC Naftovyk Drohobych | 40 | 15 | 8 | 17 | 40 | 51 | −11 | 38 | |
| 21 | FC Trubnyk Nikopol | 40 | 11 | 15 | 14 | 26 | 32 | −6 | 37 | |
| 22 | FC Torpedo Berdyansk | 40 | 13 | 11 | 16 | 28 | 41 | −13 | 37 | |
| 23 | SKCF Sevastopol | 40 | 13 | 9 | 18 | 33 | 43 | −10 | 35 | |
| 24 | FC Shakhtar Oleksandriya | 40 | 11 | 12 | 17 | 33 | 46 | −13 | 34 | |
| 25 | FC Shakhtar Krasnyi Luch | 40 | 9 | 13 | 18 | 19 | 52 | −33 | 31 | |
| 26 | FC Podillya Kamianets-Podilskyi | 40 | 10 | 10 | 20 | 29 | 48 | −19 | 30 | |
| 27 | FC Shakhtar Torez | 40 | 7 | 12 | 21 | 16 | 44 | −28 | 26 | |

(P) Promoted

== See also ==
- Soviet Second League
