= 1968 KFK competitions (Ukraine) =

KFK competitions
- Season: 1968
- Champions: Druzhba Buchach

The 1968 KFK competitions in Ukraine were part of the 1968 Soviet KFK competitions that were conducted in the Soviet Union. It was 5th season of the KFK in Ukraine since its introduction in 1964.

== First stage ==
=== Group 1 ===
- GUS Horlivka
- Shakhtar Kirovsk
- Avanhard Vilnohirsk
- Mayak Kharkiv

=== Group 2 ===
- Temp Kyiv
- Spartak Kirovohrad
- Vahonobudivnyk Kremenchuk
- Sumy Oblast

=== Group 3 ===
- Kolhospnyk Buchach
- Avanhard Bila Tserkva
- Elektryk Lutsk
- Kolos Bar

=== Group 4 ===
- Khimik Kalush
- Khimik Chernihiv
- Enerhetyk Zhytomyr
- Lokomotyv Smila

=== Group 5 ===
- Tytan Zaporizhia
- Avanhard Boryslav
- Vostannie Tatarbunary
- Molot Yevpatoria
- Zenit Mykolaiv

== Final ==
Final stage was taking place on 24 October – 1 November 1968 in cities of Kalush and Broshniv-Osada.

Pos	Team	Pld	W	D	L	GF	GA	GD	Pts
1	Druzhba Buchach	5	4	0	1	9	2	+7	8
2	GUS Horlivka	5	3	0	2	11	6	+5	6
3	Temp Kyiv	5	3	0	2	4	4	0	6
4	Tytan Zaporizhia	5	2	0	3	4	5	−1	4
5	VPU Lviv	5	2	0	3	3	7	−4	4
6	Khimik Kalush	5	1	0	4	2	8	−6	2

Source: ukr-football.org.ua

== Promotion ==
None of KFK teams were promoted to the 1969 Ukrainian Class B.

- none

However, to the Class B were promoted following teams that did not participate in the KFK competitions:

- FC Budivelnyk Pervomaisk
- FC Avanhard Antratsyt
