= 1965 KFK competitions (Ukraine) =

KFK competitions in Ukraine

KFK competitions
- Season: 1965
- Champions: Metalist Sevastopol

The 1965 KFK competitions in Ukraine (Ukrainian: Чемпіонат УРСР з футболу серед КФК 1965) were part of the 1965 Soviet KFK competitions that were conducted in the Soviet Union. It was the second season of KFK in Ukraine. The winner was not admitted to the 1966 Soviet Second League (1966 Ukrainian Class B).

== Teams ==
From last season 26 teams, 15 of them ceased their participation in the competition, while the total number of participants increased by 2 to 28. There were one relegated team and 17 teams that were debuting at republican level.

- Relegation from 1964 Ukrainian Class B (1): Temp Kyiv
- Debut (17): Metalurh Sevastopol, Lokomotyv Kherson (reserves), Avanhard Kremenchuk, Shakhtar Lysychansk, Lokomotyv Kupiansk, Shakhtar Konotop, Avtoshklo Kostiantynivka, Spartak Kirovohrad, Avanhard Terny, Lokomotyv Smila, Voskhod Chernivtsi, Syhnal Kotovsk, Vostok Mohyliv-Podilsky, Budivelnyk Chernihiv, Naftovyk Nadvirna, Shakhtar Novovolynsk, Kolhospnyk Berezhany

== Group stage ==
=== Group 1 ===
Pos	Team	Pld	W	D	L	GF	GA	GD	Pts	Qualification
1	Metalurh Sevastopol	8	6	0	2	15	6	+9	12	Advanced to Final
2	Strila Zaporizhia	8	4	2	2	7	4	+3	10	
3	Enerhiya Nova Kakhovka	8	2	3	3	9	10	−1	7	
4	Torpedo Mykolaiv	8	3	1	4	6	9	−3	7	
5	Lokomotyv Kherson (reserves)	8	1	2	5	5	13	−8	4	withdrew

Source: ukr-football.org.ua

Notes:

- Lokomotyv Kherson that played in the 1965 Ukrainian Class B was fielding its reserve team

=== Group 2 ===
Pos	Team	Pld	W	D	L	GF	GA	GD	Pts	Qualification
1	Avanhard Kremenchuk	6	4	1	1	10	9	+1	9	Advanced to Final
2	Shakhtar Lysychansk	6	3	2	1	10	4	+6	8	withdrew
3	Lokomotyv Kupyansk	6	1	4	1	5	5	0	6	withdrew
4	Shakhtar Konotop	6	0	1	5	2	9	−7	1	withdrew

Source: ukr-football.org.ua

=== Group 3 ===
Pos	Team	Pld	W	D	L	GF	GA	GD	Pts	Qualification
1	Avtosklo Kostyantynivka	6	5	1	0	11	1	+10	11	Advanced to Final
2	Spartak Kirovohrad	6	3	1	2	7	5	+2	7	
3	Avanhard Terny	6	2	1	3	9	10	−1	5	
4	Lokomotyv Smila	6	0	1	5	6	17	−11	1	

Source: ukr-football.org.ua

=== Group 4 ===
Pos	Team	Pld	W	D	L	GF	GA	GD	Pts	Qualification
1	Voskhod Chernivtsi	4	3	0	1	3	3	0	6	Advanced to Final
2	Syhnal Kotovsk	4	2	1	1	4	2	+2	5	withdrew
3	Vostok Mohyliv-Podilskyi	4	0	1	3	0	2	−2	1	withdrew
4	Podillya Kamianets-Podilskyi	0	-	-	-	0	0	0	0	withdrew

Source: ukr-football.org.ua

=== Group 5 ===
Pos	Team	Pld	W	D	L	GF	GA	GD	Pts	Qualification
1	Temp Kyiv	8	7	1	0	11	1	+10	15	Advanced to Final
2	Prohres Berdychiv	8	5	1	2	13	14	−1	11	
3	Tekstylshchyk Rivne	8	3	1	4	9	12	−3	7	
4	Avtotraktordetal Bila Tserkva	8	2	2	4	11	13	−2	6	
5	Budivelnyk Chernihiv	8	0	1	7	2	6	−4	1	

Source: ukr-football.org.ua

=== Group 6 ===
Pos	Team	Pld	W	D	L	GF	GA	GD	Pts	Qualification
1	Budivelnyk Khust	8	4	3	1	14	10	+4	11	Advanced to Final
2	Naftovyk Nadvirna	8	3	3	2	11	10	+1	9	withdrew
3	Khimik Kalush	8	3	2	3	12	12	0	8	withdrew
4	Shakhtar Novovolynsk	8	2	3	3	14	14	0	7	
5	Kolhospnyk Berezhany	8	1	3	4	12	17	−5	5	withdrew
6	LVVPU SA I VMF	0	-	-	-	0	0	0	0	withdrew

Source: ukr-football.org.ua

== Final ==
Final stage was taking place on 30 October – 5 November 1965 in city of Khust.

Pos	Team	Pld	W	D	L	GF	GA	GD	Pts	Promotion
1	Metalurh Sevastopol	5	4	1	0	9	1	+8	9	
2	Avtosklo Kostiantynivka	5	3	2	0	8	4	+4	8	withdrew
3	Budivelnyk Khust	5	1	2	2	6	7	−1	4	
4	Temp Kyiv	5	0	4	1	5	6	−1	4	
5	Avanhard Kremenchuk	5	1	1	3	7	14	−7	3	
6	Voskhod Chernivtsi	5	0	2	3	2	5	−3	2	

Source: ukr-football.org.ua

== Promotion ==
None of KFK teams were promoted to the 1966 Ukrainian Class B.

- None

However, to the Class B were promoted following teams that did not participate in the KFK competitions:

- FC Torpedo Berdyansk
- FC Azovets Zhdanov
- FC Avanhard Makiivka
- FC Start Dzerzhynsk

== See also ==
- 1965 Ukrainian Class B
- 1965 Football Cup of Ukrainian SSR among KFK
