= Dmytro Yarchuk =

Ukrainian footballer

Personal information
- Full name: Dmytro Vadymovych Yarchuk
- Date of birth: 23 March 1994 (age 32)
- Place of birth: Mykolaiv, Ukraine
- Height: 1.85 m (6 ft 1 in)
- Position: Midfielder

Team information
- Current team: Tytan Odesa

Youth career
- 2007–2008: Youth Sportive School Mykolaiv
- 2008–2011: Torpedo Mykolaiv

Senior career*
Years	Team	Apps	(Gls)
2010–2012	Torpedo Mykolaiv	6	(0)
2012–2014	Tavriya Simferopol	16	(0)
2014	Torpedo Mykolaiv	1	(0)
2015–2016	1461 Trabzon	0	(0)
2016	Hirnyk-Sport Komsomolsk	12	(0)
2016–2018	Estoril Praia	7	(0)
2017	→ Leixões (loan)	0	(0)
2017	→ Vilafranquense (loan)	3	(0)
2018–2021	Pervomaisk	64	(24)
2021–2023	Vast Mykolaiv	19	(7)
2023–	Tytan Odesa	3	(1)
- * Club domestic league appearances and goals as of 28 December 2023

Dmytro Vadymovych Yarchuk (Ukrainian: Дмитро Вадимович Ярчук; born 23 March 1994) is a Ukrainian amateur footballer who plays as a midfielder for Tytan Odesa.

== Career ==
Yarchuk made his debut for SC Tavriya Simferopol played in the main-squad team against FC Sevastopol on 3 August 2013 in Ukrainian Premier League.
