= 1969 KFK competitions (Ukraine) =

KFK competitions
- Season: 1969
- Champions: Shakhtar Kirovsk

The 1969 KFK competitions in Ukraine were part of the 1969 Soviet KFK competitions that were conducted in the Soviet Union. It was 6th season of the KFK in Ukraine since its introduction in 1964.

== First stage ==
=== Group 1 ===
Pos	Team	Pld	W	D	L	GF	GA	GD	Pts
1	Shakhtar Kirovsk	6	5	1	0	7	2	+5	11
2	Avanhard Vilnohirsk	6	3	1	2	6	3	+3	7
3	Shakhtar Makiivka	6	3	0	3	5	6	−1	6
4	Shakhtar Konotop	6	0	0	6	3	10	−7	0

Source: ukr-football.org.ua

=== Group 2 ===
Pos	Team	Pld	W	D	L	GF	GA	GD	Pts
1	Mayak Kharkiv	6	5	0	1	17	8	+9	10
2	Temp Kyiv	6	2	1	3	7	8	−1	5
3	Lokomotyv Znamianka	6	2	1	3	5	8	−3	5
4	Sputnik Poltava	6	1	2	3	7	12	−5	4

Source: ukr-football.org.ua

=== Group 3 ===
Pos	Team	Pld	W	D	L	GF	GA	GD	Pts
1	Karpaty Kolomyia	4	2	2	0	7	5	+2	6
2	LVVPU Lviv	4	2	1	1	12	6	+6	5
3	Horyn Dubrovytsia	4	0	1	3	6	14	−8	1
4	Kolos Bar	0	-	-	-	-	-	—	0

Source: ukr-football.org.ua

=== Group 4 ===
Pos	Team	Pld	W	D	L	GF	GA	GD	Pts
1	Voskhod Chernivtsi	8	5	1	2	13	9	+4	11
2	Budivelnyk Khust	8	4	1	3	11	7	+4	9
3	Lokomotyv Kovel	8	2	4	2	7	9	−2	8
4	Mayak Berezhany	8	1	4	3	9	8	+1	6
5	Avanhard Khmelnytskyi	8	2	2	4	6	13	−7	6

Source: ukr-football.org.ua

=== Group 5 ===
Pos	Team	Pld	W	D	L	GF	GA	GD	Pts
1	Kolos Buchach	8	7	0	1	19	3	+16	14
2	Shakhtar Vatutine	8	4	0	4	10	9	+1	8
3	Avanhard Malyn	8	3	2	3	6	11	−5	8
4	Avtomobilist Bila Tserkva	8	2	1	5	10	15	−5	5
5	Avanhard Pryluky	8	1	3	4	7	14	−7	5

Source: ukr-football.org.ua

=== Group 6 ===
Pos	Team	Pld	W	D	L	GF	GA	GD	Pts
1	Meteor Zaporizhia	8	7	0	1	12	1	+11	14
2	Avanhard Simferopil	8	7	0	1	11	7	+4	14
3	Spartak Mykolaiv	8	2	2	4	7	8	−1	6
4	Budivelnyk Henichesk	8	1	2	5	4	10	−6	4
5	Taksomotor Odesa	8	1	0	7	1	9	−8	2

Source: ukr-football.org.ua

== Final ==
Final stage was taking place on 18 October – 26 October 1969 in cities of Kirovsk, Kadiivka, and Bryanka.

Pos	Team	Pld	W	D	L	GF	GA	GD	Pts
1	Shakhtar Kirovsk	5	3	2	0	8	1	+7	8
2	Mayak Kharkiv	5	2	2	1	8	5	+3	6
3	Meteor Zaporizhia	5	2	2	1	6	4	+2	6
4	Kolos Buchach	5	1	3	1	7	5	+2	5
5	Voskhod Chernivtsi	5	0	3	2	5	7	−2	3
6	Karpaty Kolomyia	5	0	2	3	3	15	−12	2

Source: ukr-football.org.ua

== Promotion ==
None of KFK teams were promoted to the 1970 Ukrainian Class B.

- FC Shakhtar Kirovsk

However, to the Class B were promoted following teams that did not participate in the KFK competitions:

- none
