= FC Torpedo Mykolaiv =

Football club from Mykolaiv, Ukraine

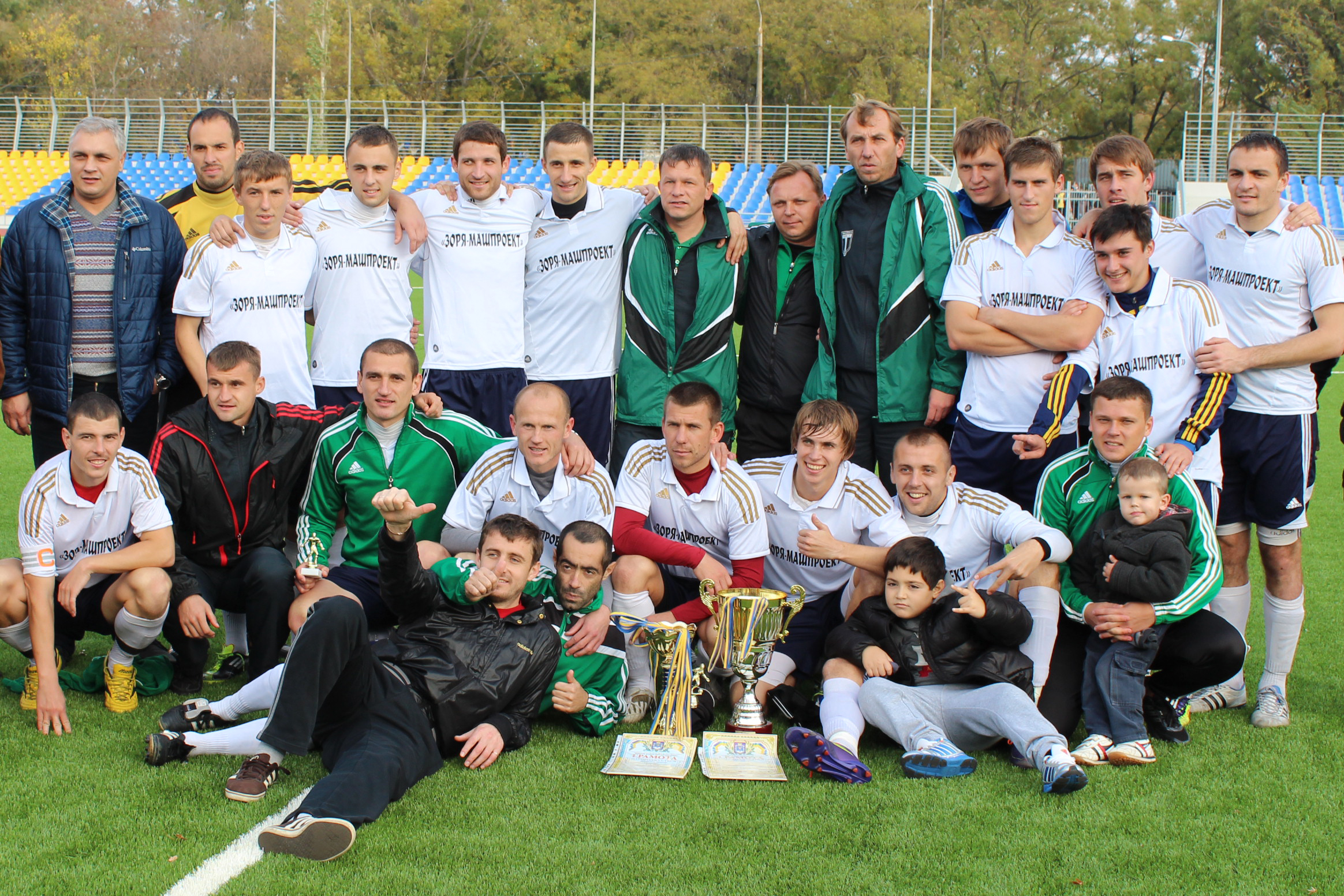
Torpedo Mykolaiv, October 2013

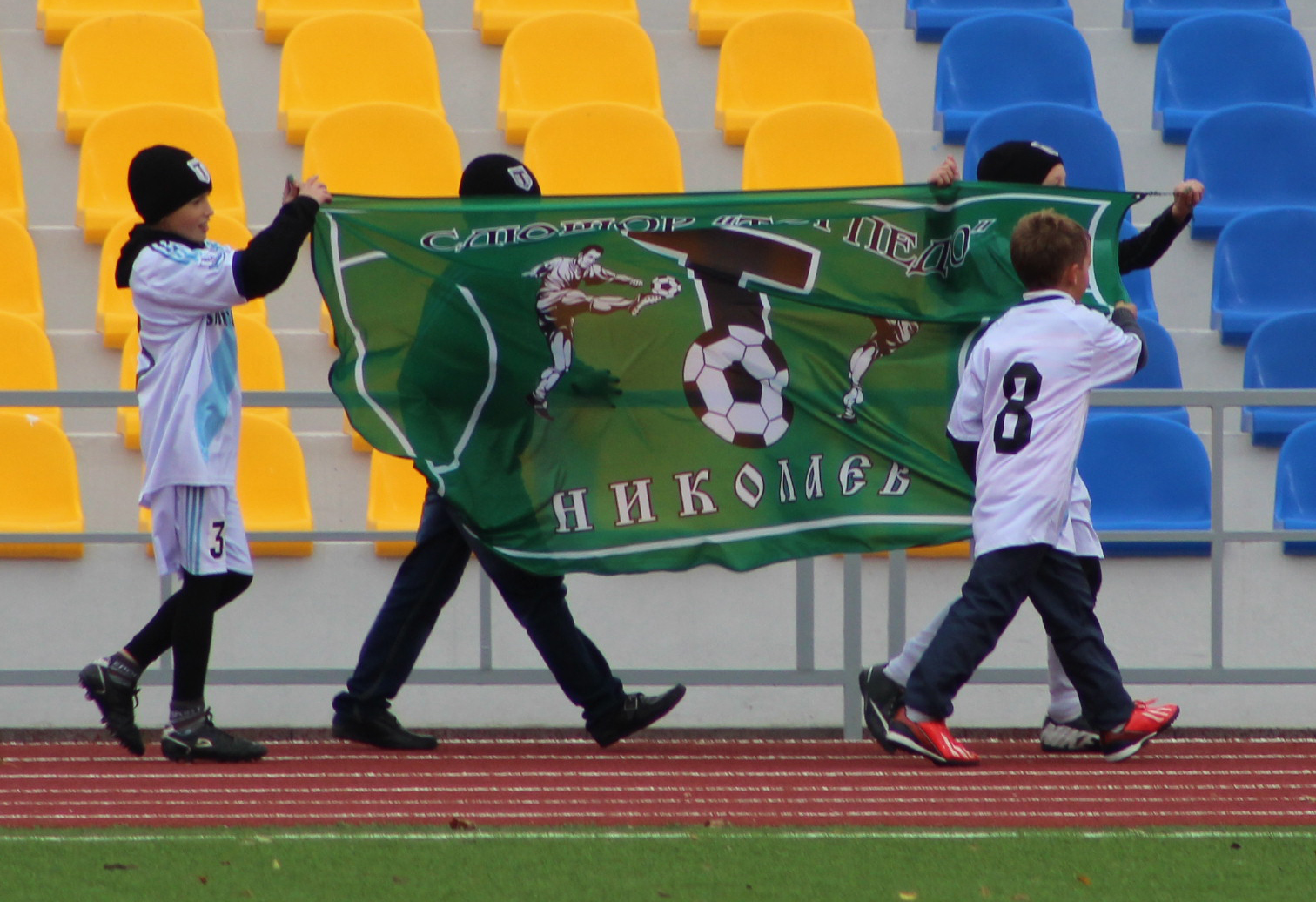
Students of the Specialized sports school of Olympic Reserve Torpedo Mykolaiv carrying a flag of the organization

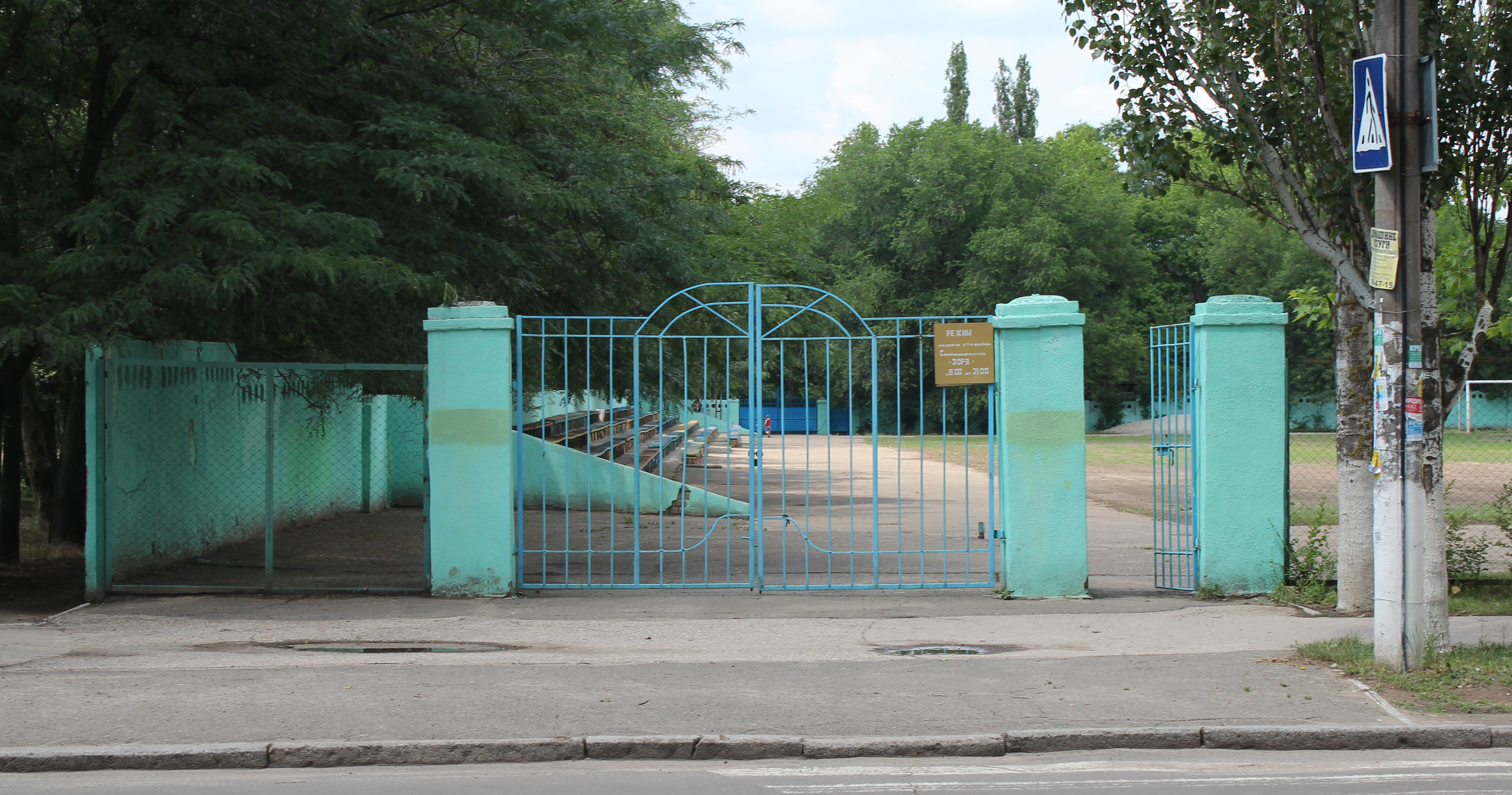
Entrance to the Zoria Stadium, Mykolaiv (2013)

FC Torpedo Mykolaiv is an amateur football club from Mykolaiv, Ukraine competing at the regional competitions of Mykolaiv Oblast. The club plays its games at the stadium of the Zoria-Mashproekt Factory.

== Overview ==
The club was founded in 1955 by the Zoria-Mashproekt Factory as Avanhard Mykolaiv. In 1957, it changed its name to Torpedo Mykolaiv. Sometime in the 1980s, the club ceased its operations.

It was revived once again in 2001 as Zoria-Mashproekt by Zoria-Mashproekt. In 2005, it changed its name again to Torpedo Mykolaiv.

Since 1987, the specialized sports school of Olympic Reserve Torpedo Mykolaiv has existed in Mykolaiv, providing younger footballers with training support.

== Honours ==
- Football Cup of the Ukrainian SSR
  - Finalist: 1963 (qualified for the Soviet Amateur Cup)
- Ukrainian football championship among amateurs
  - Runners-up (2): 2008, 2009
- Ukrainian Amateur Cup
  - Finalist (1): 2007
- Football championship of Mykolaiv Oblast
  - Winners (12): 1958–1961, 1963, 1965, 1982, 2005, 2006, 2008, 2010, 2011
  - Runners-up (5): 1964, 1973, 1979, 2007, 2012
- Mykolaiv Oblast Football Cup
  - Holders (8): 1955, 1959, 1960, 1963, 1965, 1974, 2008, 2011, 2012
  - Finalists (7): 1966, 1969, 1971, 1979, 2006, 2007, 2008, 2010
- Mykolaiv City Cup
  - Holders: 2002, 2004

== Notable players ==
- (Ukraine) Dmytro Yarchuk
- (Australia) Nikita Rukavytsya (youth)
- (Ukraine) Vadym Sapay (youth)
- (Ukraine) Oleh Kozhushko (youth)
- (Ukraine) Ihor Snurnitsyn (youth)
- (Ukraine) Illya Hulko (youth)
- (Ukraine) Artem Umanets (youth)

== Gallery ==
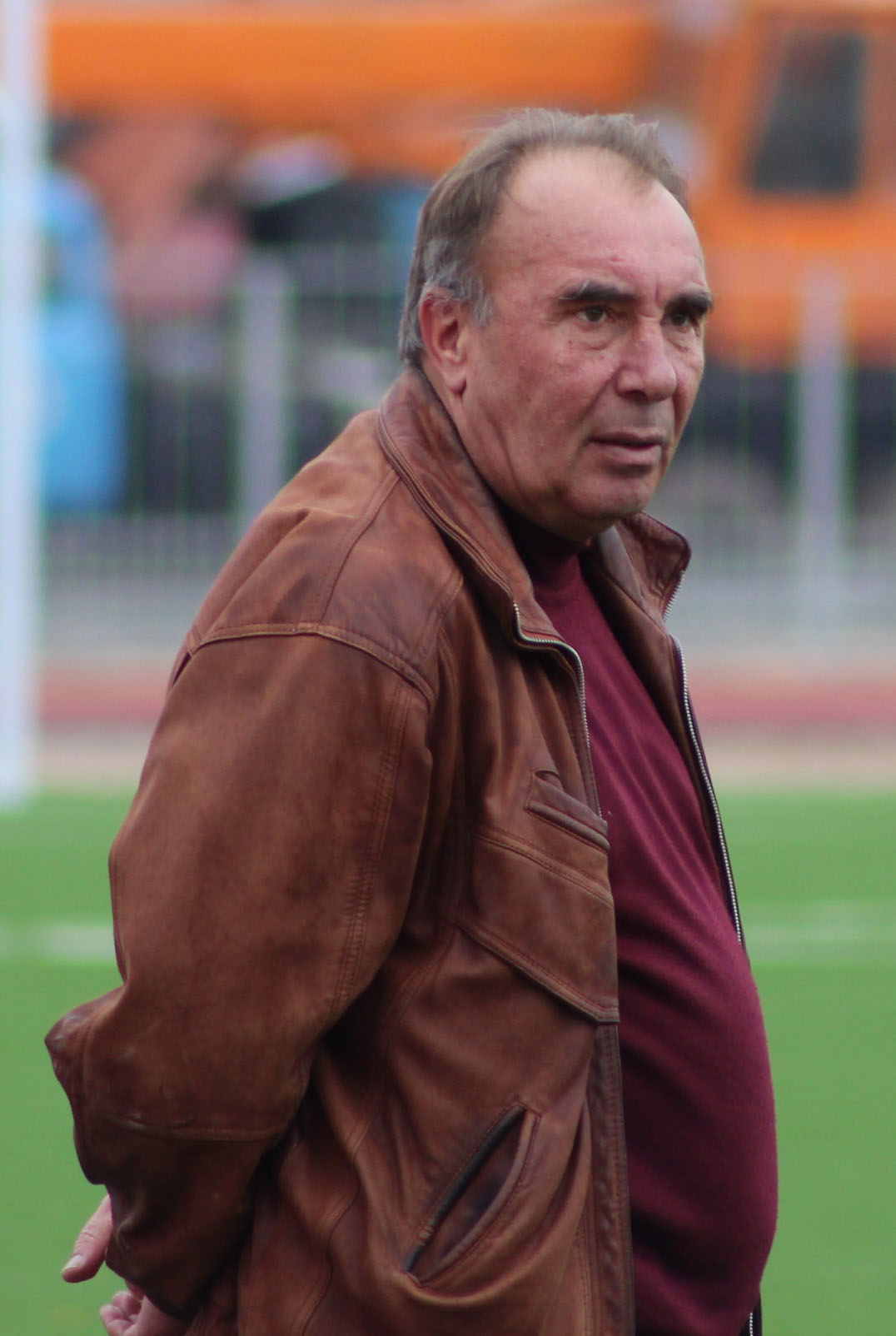
Volodymyr Kozenko who coached the senior team in 2004–2013

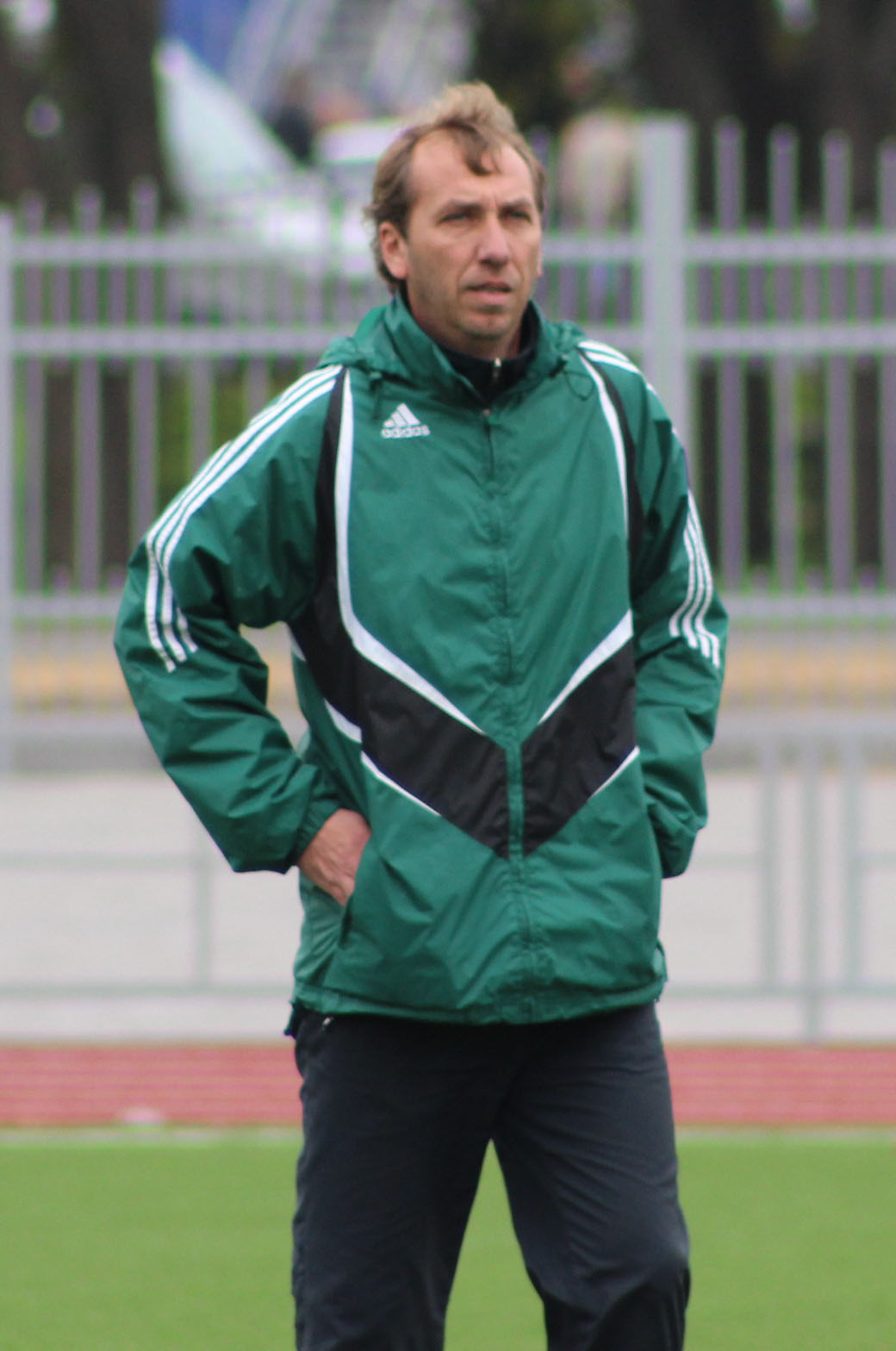
Vitaliy Kotov, a Torpedo's coach since 2013
