= FC Kolos Buchach =

Amateur football team in Ukraine

FC Kolos Buchach is an amateur football team based in a small city of Buchach, Ukraine. It plays in the Ternopil Championship (season 2018–19).

== History ==
Notable the club became after 1965 when head coach of another amateur club Karpaty Broshniv-Osada (Ivano-Frankivsk Oblast), Petro Savchuk was invited to lead Kolos Buchach. Along with the coach, number of Karpaty's footballers moved to Kolos as well.

== Honors ==
Ukrainian championship for collective teams of physical culture

- Winners (1): 1968
- Runners-up (1): 1966

Ternopil Oblast football championship

- Winners (8): 1966, 1967, 1968, 1969, 1970, 1971, 1972, 1973
- Runners-up (1): 2006

== Coaches ==
- 1965–1973 Petro Savchuk
