= FC Hirnyk Rovenky =

Hirnyk Rovenky
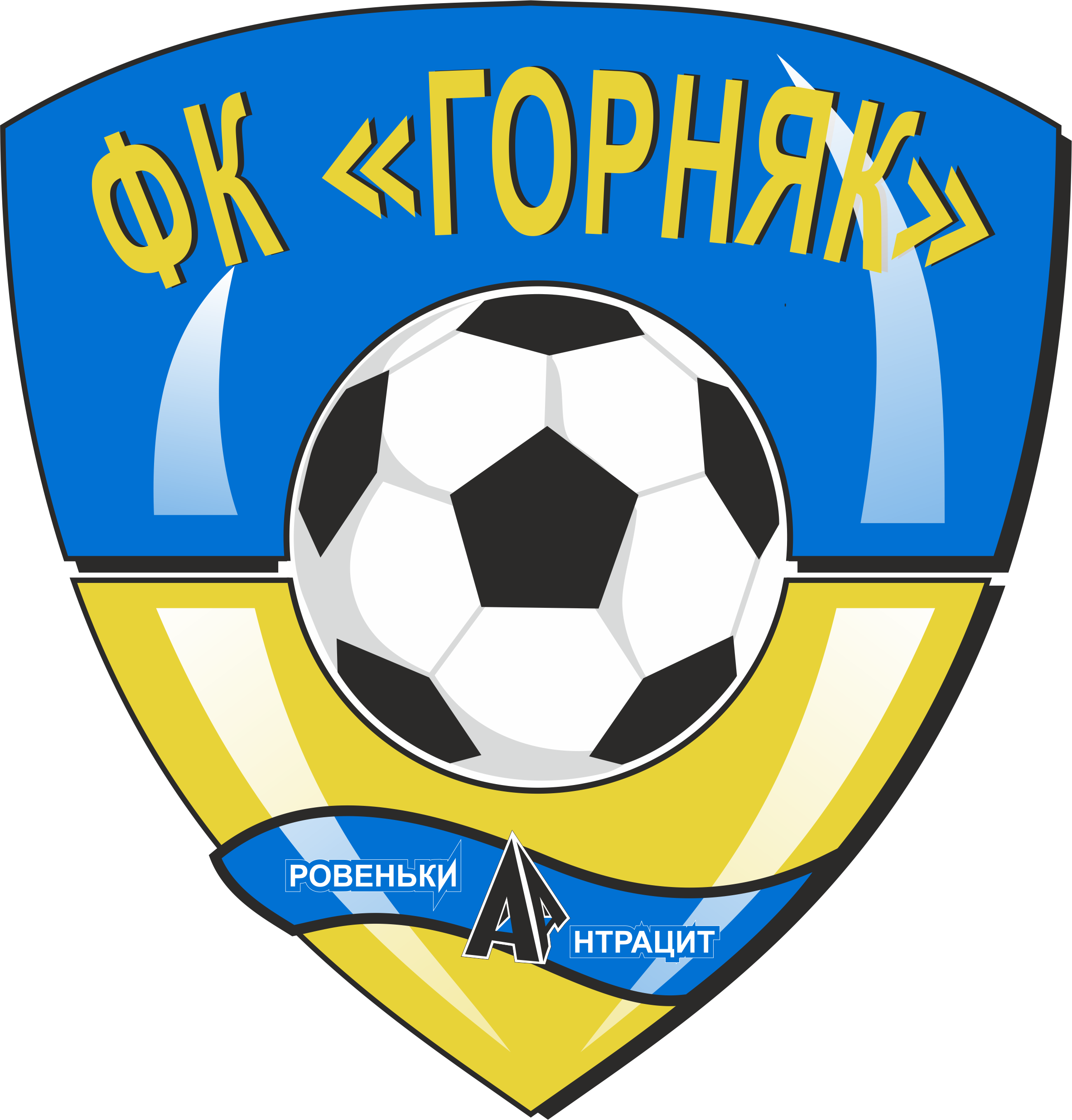
- Full name: FC Hirnyk Rovenky
- Founded: 1924
- Dissolved: 2014
- League: Donbas Football Championship
- 2013: 2nd

FC Hirnyk Rovenky (Ukrainian: Футбольний клуб «Гірник») was a Ukrainian football club from Rovenky, Luhansk Oblast. The club was formerly known as FC Avanhard Rovenky.

== History ==
=== Main club ===
Some trace its history back to 1924 when there was created the first football club in the city as the 1.RFC "Krasny Gornyak". However, Avanhard is better known since 1946 when the team started to compete under the flag of Voluntary Sports Society (VSS) Shakhter. In 1957 Several such societies in Ukraine were merged as the VSS Avanhard. In Soviet Union Avanhard Rovenky mostly competed in regional competitions or competitions among the society's members. In 1968 the club was included in competitions of masters category which is today referred to professionals.

The club once again appeared in the Ukrainian professional competitions after the fall of Soviet Union where it competed for some 10 years. At the end of 2003 Avahard Rovenky went through some financial difficulties and merged with another amateur club FC Inter Luhansk into FC Avanhard-Inter Luhansk, but soon it merged again with FC Molnia Sieverodonetsk. Since then FC Avanhard-Inter Luhansk was playing in Sieverodonetsk, while most of its squad were players of Molnia. After the 2003–2004 season, Molnia recovered its name replacing FC Avanhard-Inter Luhansk in the league.

=== Shakhtar Rovenky ===
On 2 March 1995 at the Frunze Mine of Rovenky-Antratsyt was organized another team Shakhtar Rovenky that in 1995 became a champion of the Luhansk Oblast Championship and participated in national amateur competitions. Out of Luhansk on the post of head coach was invited Yevhen Kotylevskyi who previously worked at the Luhansk School of Olympic Reserve (UOR Luhansk). Most of players were from Luhansk except for couple of local footballers.

The team did not exist long and after playing 10 games in the 1996 Luhansk Oblast Championship withdrew from all competitions and was dissolved.

== Honours ==
- Ukrainian Second League
  - Winners: 1996–97 (group)
- Football Championship of Ukrainian SSR/Ukraine among KFK/amateurs
  - Winners (2): 1967, 1993–94 (group)
  - Runners-up: 1992–93
- Donbas Football Championship (Donetsk and Luhansk oblasts)
  - Runners-up: 2013
- Luhansk Oblast Football Championship
  - Winners (6): 1964, 1966, 1967, 1983, 1989, 2012
  - Runners-up (3): 1949, 1980, 1992

== League and cup history ==
Season	Div.	Pos.	Pl.	W	D	L	GS	GA	P	Domestic Cup	Europe	Notes

== See also ==
- Rovenky-Antratsyt
