= 1974 Football Cup of Ukrainian SSR among KFK =

1974 Ukrainian Amateur Cup
Tournament details
- Country: Soviet Union (Ukrainian SSR)

Final positions
- Champions: FC Sokil Lviv
- Runners-up: FC Shakhtar Oleksandriya

The 1974 Football Cup of Ukrainian SSR among KFK was the annual season of Ukraine's football knockout competition for amateur football teams.

== Competition schedule ==
=== First qualification round ===
Team 1	Score	Team 2
FC Vohnetryvnyk Chasiv Yar	1–3	FC Strila Zaporizhia
FC Arsenal Kyiv	4–2	FC Fotoprylad Cherkasy
FC Shakhtar Oleksandriya	2–1	FC Torpedo Mykolaiv
FC Prohres Berdychiv	3–1	FC Lokomotyv Kyiv
FC Metalurh Kupyansk	3–0	FC Spartak Krolevets
FC Refryzherator Fastiv	3–0	FC Tsukrovyk Bobrovytsia
FC Sokil Lviv	5–0	FC Avanhard Mohyliv-Podilskyi
FC Fiolent Simferopol	3–1	FC Hvardiyets Odesa
FC Urozhai Kolchyno	2–0	FC Motor Chortkiv
FC Sluch Krasyliv	3–0	FC Khimik Kalush
FC Promin Poltava	3–1	FC Avanhard Lozova
FC Atlantyka Sevastopol (reserves)	1–0	FC Enerhiya Nova Kakhovka
FC Torpedo Lutsk (reserves)	1–3	FC Zirka Lviv
FC Karpaty Vyzhnitsa	1–1	FC Torpedo Rivne
FC Shakhtar Zorynsk	0–2	FC Monolit Donetsk
FC ZKL Dnipropetrovsk	5–1	FC Tekstylnyk Voroshilovgrad

Replay

Team 1	Score	Team 2
FC Karpaty Vyzhnitsa	0–1	FC Torpedo Rivne

=== Second qualification round ===
Team 1	Score	Team 2
FC Fiolent Simferopol	w/o	FC Atlantyka Sevastopol (reserves)
FC Urozhai Kolchyno	0–1	FC Sluch Krasyliv
FC Monolit Donetsk	5–2	FC ZKL Dnipropetrovsk
FC Sokil Lviv	5–0	FC Prohres Berdychiv
FC Zirka Lviv	3–0	FC Torpedo Rivne
FC Metalurh Kupyansk	0–2	FC Promin Poltava
FC Shakhtar Oleksandriya	1–0	FC Strila Zaporizhia
FC Arsenal Kyiv	3–2	FC Refryzherator Fastiv

=== Quarterfinals (1/4) ===
Team 1	Score	Team 2
FC Arsenal Kyiv	1–2	FC Sokil Lviv
FC Shakhtar Oleksandriya	1–0	FC Fiolent Simferopol
FC Zirka Lviv	2–1	FC Sluch Krasyliv
FC Monolit Donetsk	2–1	FC Promin Poltava

=== Semifinals (1/2) ===
Team 1	Score	Team 2
FC Sokil Lviv	2–1	FC Zirka Lviv
FC Shakhtar Oleksandriya	1–0	FC Monolit Donetsk

=== Final ===
Team 1	Score	Team 2
FC Sokil Lviv	0–0	FC Shakhtar Oleksandriya

Replay

Team 1	Score	Team 2
FC Sokil Lviv	1–0	FC Shakhtar Oleksandriya

== See also ==
- 1974 KFK competitions (Ukraine)
