= 1972 Football Cup of Ukrainian SSR among KFK =

1972 Ukrainian Amateur Cup
Tournament details
- Country: Soviet Union (Ukrainian SSR)

Final positions
- Champions: FC Hirnyk Dniprorudne
- Runners-up: FC Khimik Kalush

The 1972 Football Cup of Ukrainian SSR among KFK was the annual season of Ukraine's football knockout competition for amateur football teams.

== Competition schedule ==
=== Preliminary round ===
Team 1	Score	Team 2
FC Sluch Krasyliv	3–1	FC Dnister Zalishchyky
FC Frunzenets Sumy (reserves)	5–0	FC Avanhard Uman
FC Start Chuhuiv	7–1	FC Suputnyk Poltava
FC Avanhard Mohyliv-Podilskyi	0–2	FC Bilshovyk Kyiv
FC Metalist Sevastopol	0–1	FC Hirnyk Dniprorudne
FC Lehmash Chernivtsi	1–2	FC Khimik Kalush
FC Enerhiya Nova Kakhovka	4–0	FC Komunarovets Mykolaiv

=== First qualification round ===
August 19

Team 1	Score	Team 2
FC Khimik Kalush	2–1	FC Khimik Perechyn
FC Torpedo Lutsk (reserves)	3–0	FC Burevisnyk Rivne
FC Hirnyk Dniprorudne	4–1	FC Shakhtar Krasnodon
FC Sluch Krasyliv	1–0	FC Sokil Lviv
FC Start Chuhuiv	5–0	FC Avanhard Vilnohirsk
FC Avanhard Simferopol (reserves)	0–2	FC Enerhiya Nova Kakhovka
FC Bilshovyk Kyiv	3–0	FC Kolos Borodianka
FC Tsvetmet Artemivsk	2–0	FC Frunzenets Sumy (reserves)
FC Avanhard Novohrad-Volynskyi	1–2	FC Avtomobilist Chernihiv
FC Shakhtar Oleksandriya	3–2	FC Avtomobiist Odesa

=== Second qualification round ===
August 26

Team 1	Score	Team 2
FC Khimik Kalush	4–0	FC Torpedo Lutsk (reserves)
FC Avtomobilist Chernihiv	w/o	FC Sluch Krasyliv
FC Enerhiya Nova Kakhovka	4–0	FC Tsvetmet Artemivsk
FC Bilshovyk Kyiv	1–0	FC Start Chuhuiv
FC Hirnyk Dniprorudne	2–0	FC Shakhtar Oleksandriya

=== Quarterfinals (1/4) ===
September 24

Team 1	Score	Team 2
FC Khimik Kalush	2–0	FC Avtomobilist Chernihiv

=== Semifinals (1/2) ===
Team 1	Score	Team 2
FC Khimik Kalush	w/o	FC Enerhiya Nova Kakhovka
FC Bilshovyk Kyiv	0–1	FC Hirnyk Dniprorudne

=== Final ===
October 15

Team 1	Score	Team 2
FC Hirnyk Dniprorudne	2–0	FC Khimik Kalush

== See also ==
- 1972 KFK competitions (Ukraine)
- 1972 Cup of the Ukrainian SSR
