= 1988 Football Cup of Ukrainian SSR among KFK =

1988 Ukrainian Amateur Cup
Tournament details
- Country: Soviet Union (Ukrainian SSR)

Final positions
- Champions: FC Avanhard Lozova
- Runners-up: FC Zirka Berdychiv

The 1988 Football Cup of Ukrainian SSR among KFK was the annual season of Ukraine's football knockout competition. It was a republican-level competition; therefore, teams of masters that competed at the All-Union level did not participate.

== Competition schedule ==
=== First qualification round ===
Team 1	Score	Team 2
FC Enerhiya Nova Kakhovka	4–4 (5–3 p)	FC Meteor Simferopol
FC Dnister Zalishchyky	5–0	FC Plastyk Vynohradove
FC Karpaty Kamianka-Buzka	5–0	FC Khimik Rivne
FC Voskhod Kiev	2–1	FC Hranit Sharhorod
FC Avanhard Smila	0–2	FC Hirnyk Pavlohrad
FC Radyst Kirovohrad	0–1	FC Avanhard Lozova
FC Pivdenstal Yenakieve	1–1 (4–2 p)	FC Khimik Severodonetsk
FC Olimpiyets Prymorsk	1–0	FC Shakhtar Snizhne
FC Naftovyk Pyriatyn	2–0	FC Nyva Myronivka
FC Naftovyk Dolyna	5–3	FC Pidshypnyk Lutsk
FC Sudnoremontnyk Illichivsk	w/o	Mykolaiv Oblast

=== Second qualification round ===
Team 1	Score	Team 2
FC Enerhiya Nova Kakhovka	w/o	FC Sudnoremontnyk Illichivsk
FC Khimik Chernihiv	0–2	FC Khimik Bezdryk
FC Hirnyk Pavlohrad	2–1	FC Voskhod Kiev
FC Naftovyk Dolyna	3–1	FC Dnister Zalishchyky
FC Naftovyk Pyriatyn	1–1 (4–5 p)	FC Olimpiyets Prymorsk
FC Iskra Teofipol	0–0 (4–2 p)	FC Emalposud Sadhora
FC Zirka Berdychiv	3–0	FC Karpaty Kamianka-Buzka
FC Avanhard Lozova	2–1	FC Pivdenstal Yenakieve

=== Quarterfinals (1/4) ===
Team 1	Score	Team 2
FC Khimik Bezdryk	4–0	FC Olimpiyets Prymorsk
FC Hirnyk Pavlohrad	0–1	FC Naftovyk Dolyna
FC Zirka Berdychiv	2–0	FC Iskra Teofipol
FC Avanhard Lozova	1–1 (5–4 p)	FC Enerhiya Nova Kakhovka

=== Semifinals (1/2) ===
Team 1	Score	Team 2
FC Naftovyk Dolyna	1–2	FC Zirka Berdychiv
FC Avanhard Lozova	2–0	FC Khimik Bezdryk

=== Final ===
Team 1	Agg.	Team 2	1st leg	2nd leg
FC Avanhard Lozova	3–3 (6–5 p)	FC Zirka Berdychiv	1–1	2–2

== See also ==
- 1988 KFK competitions (Ukraine)
