= 1954 Cup of the Ukrainian SSR =

The 1954 Ukrainian Cup was a football knockout competition conducting by the Football Federation of the Ukrainian SSR and was known as the Ukrainian Cup.

== Teams ==
=== Non-participating teams ===
The Ukrainian teams of masters did not take part in the competition.

- 1954 Soviet Class A (2): FC Dynamo Kyiv, FC Lokomotyv Kharkiv
- 1954 Soviet Class B (7): FC Shakhtar Stalino, FC Metalurh Zaporizhia, FC Metalurh Dnipropetrovsk, FC Spartak Uzhhorod, FC Metalurh Odesa, ODO Lvov, ODO Kiev

== Competition schedule ==
=== First elimination round ===
FC Shakhtar Stalino (Rep)	13:2	FC Khimik Pavlohrad	in Stalino
FC Spartak Kiev (Rep)	2:1	FC Dynamo Zhytomyr
FC Trud Vinnytsia (Rep)	8:2	FC Urozhai Rivno
FC Zenit Kyiv (Rep)	4:2	(Rep) FC Dynamo Khmelnytskyi
FC Iskra Vynohradiv	2:4	FC Dynamo Lviv
FC Dynamo Ternopil (Rep)	+:–	(Rep) FC Spartak Stanislav	(did not appear)
FC Naftovyk Drohobych (Rep)	+:–	(Rep) FC Dynamo Lutsk	(did not appear)
FC Dynamo Chernivtsi (Rep)	+:–	(Rep) FC Spartak Kherson	(did not appear)
ODO Odessa (Rep)	2:1	(Rep) FC Enerhiya Kharkiv
FC Torpedo Fastiv	0:3	(Rep) FC Budivelnyk Mykolaiv
Yevpatoria team	2:0	FC Khimik Rubizhne
Sevastopol team	4:0	(Rep) FC Mashynobudivnyk Dnipropetrovsk
FC Torpedo Kharkiv (Rep)	4:1	(Rep) FC Torpedo Kirovohrad
FC Mashynobudivnyk Zaporizhia (Rep)	0:2	FC Khimik Slovyansk
FC Torpedo Sumy (Rep)	1:0	(Rep) FC Lokomotyv Poltava
FC Kharchovyk Cherkasy	0:1	(Rep) Chernihiv team

=== Second elimination round ===
FC Budivelnyk Mykolaiv (Rep)	6:0	(Rep) FC Shakhtar Stalino
Chernihiv team (Rep)	2:0	(Rep) FC Spartak Kiev

=== Quarterfinals ===
FC Zenit Kyiv (Rep)	5:1	(Rep) FC Naftovyk Drohobych
FC Torpedo Sumy (Rep)	2:1	(Rep) Chernihiv team
FC Torpedo Kharkiv (Rep)	2:0	Sevastopol team
FC Budivelnyk Mykolaiv (Rep)	1:1	(Rep) ODO Odessa	1:3 (replay)

=== Semifinals ===
FC Zenit Kyiv (Rep)	2:0	(Rep) FC Torpedo Sumy
ODO Odessa (Rep)	1:0	(Rep) FC Torpedo Kharkiv

=== Final ===
The final was held in Kiev.

2 August 1954

FC Zenit Kyiv (Rep)	1–0	(Rep) ODO Odessa

Kiev
3 August 1954

FC Zenit Kyiv (Rep)	3–1	(Rep) ODO Odessa

Kiev

== Top goalscorers ==
Scorer	Goals	Team
(Ukrainian Soviet Socialist Republic)	?	

Ukrainian Cup 1954 Winners

FC Mashynobudivnyk Kyiv
First title

== See also ==
- 1954 Football Championship of the Ukrainian SSR
- Ukrainian Cup
