= Kharkiv Oblast Football Association =

Kharkiv Oblast Football Association is a football governing body in the region of Kharkiv Oblast, Ukraine. The association is a member of the Regional Council of UAF and the collective member of the UAF itself.

Until creation of Poltava Oblast in fall of 1937, Poltava Oblast teams played in competitions of Kharkiv Oblast.

== Presidents ==
- 1996 – 2000 Serhiy Storozhenko
- 2018 – Viktor Kovalenko

== Previous Champions ==
- 1926 Lozova / Derhachi
- 1927 Derhachi (2)
- 1928 Derhachi (3)
- 1936 Kupiansk / Poltava
- 1937 FC Lokomotyv Lozova
- 1938 FC Lokomotyv Lozova (1)
- 1939 FC Lokomotyv Lozova (2)
- 1940 FC Lokomotyv Lozova (3)
- 1941-1946 no competitions
- 1947 FC Lokomotyv Kupiansk
- 1948 FC Kharchovyk Kupiansk
- 1949 FC Lokomotyv Kupiansk (2)
- 1950 FC Budivelnyk Budy
- 1951 FC Lokomotyv Lozova (4)
- 1952 FC Lokomotyv Lozova (5)
- 1953 FC Torpedo Kharkiv
- 1954 FC Lokomotyv Lozova (6)
- 1955 FC Lokomotyv Lozova (7)
- 1956 FC Start Chuhuiv
- 1957 FC Lokomotyv Panyutyne
- 1958 FC Lokomotyv Lozova (8)
- 1959 FC Start Chuhuiv (2)
- 1960 FC Start Chuhuiv (3)
- 1961 FC Start Chuhuiv (4)
- 1962 FC Start Chuhuiv (5)
- 1963 FC Start Chuhuiv (6)
- 1964 FC Kolhospnyk Derhachi
- 1965 FC Start Chuhuiv (7)
- 1966 FC Lokomotyv Kupiansk (3)
- 1967 FC Mayak Kharkiv
- 1968 FC Mayak Kharkiv (2)
- 1969 FC Mayak Kharkiv (3)
- 1970 FC Mayak Kharkiv (4)
- 1971 FC Lokomotyv Panyutyne (2)
- 1972 FC Mashynobudivnyk Zmiiv
- 1973 FC Metalurh Kupiansk
- 1974 FC Lokomotyv Lyubotyn
- 1975 FC Metalurh Kupiansk (2)
- 1976 FC Metalurh Kupiansk (3)
- 1977 FC Metalurh Kupiansk (4)
- 1978 FC Metalurh Kupiansk (5)
- 1979 FC Metalurh Kupiansk (6)
- 1980 FC Metalurh Kupiansk (7)
- 1981 FC Metalurh Kupiansk (8)
- 1982 FC Avanhard Lozova
- 1983 FC Avanhard Lozova (2)
- 1984 FC Tsementnyk Balakliya
- 1985 FC Tsementnyk Balakliya (2)
- 1986 FC Metalurh Kupiansk (9)
- 1987 FC Metalurh Kupiansk (10)
- 1988 FC Avanhard Lozova (3)
- 1989 FC Metalurh Kupiansk (11)
- 1990 FC Kolos Barvinkove
- 1991 FC Metalurh Kupiansk (12)
- =independence of Ukraine=
- 1992 FC Avanhard Lozova (4)
- 1993 FC Avanhard Merefa
- 1994 FC Avanhard Merefa (2)
- 1995 FC Avanhard Merefa (3)
- 1996 FC Avanhard Merefa (4)
- 1996-97 FC Enerhetyk Komsomolske
- 1998 FC Krystal Parkhomivka
- 1999 FC Krystal Parkhomivka (2)
- 2000 FC Krystal Parkhomivka (3)
- 2001 FC Lokomotyv Kupiansk (4)
- 2002 FC Hazovyk-KhGV Kharkiv
- 2003 FC Lokomotyv Kupiansk (5)
- 2004 FC Enerhetyk Solonytsivka
- 2005 FC Lokomotyv Kupiansk (6)
- 2006 FC Lokomotyv Kupiansk (7)
- 2007 FC Lokomotyv Kupiansk (8)
- 2008 FC Lokomotyv Kupiansk (9)
- 2009 FC Lokomotyv Kupiansk (10)
- 2010 FC Lokomotyv Kupiansk (11)
- 2011 FC Lokomotyv Kupiansk (12)
- 2012 FC Lokomotyv Kupiansk (13)
- 2013 FC Kolos Zachepylivka
- =Russo-Ukrainian War=
- 2014 FC ETM Kharkiv
- 2015 FC ETM Kharkiv (2)
- 2016 FC Solli Plyus Kharkiv (3)
- 2017 FC Kolos Zachepylivka (2)
- 2018 FC Vovchansk
- 2019 FC Vovchansk (2)
- 2020 FC Univer-Dynamo Kharkiv
- 2021 FC Univer-Dynamo Kharkiv
- =full-scale Russian invasion=

=== Top winners ===
- 13 - FC Lokomotyv Kupiansk
- 12 - FC Metalurh Kupiansk
- 9 - FC Start Chuhuiv
- 8 - FC Lokomotyv Lozova
- 4 - 3 clubs (Olympik, Avanhard L., Avanhard M.)
- 3 - 3 clubs (Derhachi, Krystal, Solli Plyus (ETM))
- 2 - 5 clubs (Tsementnyk, Lokomotyv P., Kolos Z., Vovchansk, Univer-Dynamo)
- 1 - 10 clubs (Kupiansk, Kharchovyk K., Budivelnyk B., Torpedo, Kolhospnyk, Mashynobudivnyk, Kolos B., Lokomotyv Lyubotyn, Enerhetyk K., Enerhetyk S.)

== Professional clubs ==
locations of all professional clubs and "teams of maters"
- FC Dynamo Kharkiv, 1936-1937, 1939, 1940 (5 seasons)
- FC Spartak Kharkiv, 1936-1939, 1941 (6 seasons)
- FC Torpedo Kharkiv (KhTZ, Traktor), 1936-1937, 1949, 1960-1969 (14 seasons)
- FC Selmash Kharkiv (Serp i Molot), 1936f-1940 (5 seasons)
- FC Lokomotyv Kharkiv, 1945-1955 (11 seasons)
- FC Metalist Kharkiv (Dzerzhinets, Avangard, Metal), 1947-1949, 1956-2016, 2020- (69 seasons)
  - Metalist-2 (based on Avanhard Merefa), 1996-2005 (19 seasons)
- FC Olimpik Kharkiv (Mayak), 1972, 1982-1993 (13 seasons)

- FC Oskil Kupiansk, 1993-2002 (9 seasons)
- FC Arsenal Kharkiv, 1999-2009 (10 seasons)
- FC Helios Kharkiv (Helios-Kobra), 2003-2018 (15 seasons)
- FC Hazovyk-KhGV Kharkiv, 2003-2008 (5 seasons)
- FC Kharkiv, 2005-2010 (5 seasons)
  - Kharkiv-2, 2005-2006 (a season)
- FC Lokomotyv Dvorichna, 2006-2007 (a season)
- FC Metalist 1925 Kharkiv, 2017- (8 seasons)
  - Metalist 1925-b), 2024- (a season)
- FC Vovchansk, 2021 (a season)

== Other clubs at national/republican level ==
Note: the list includes clubs that played at republican competitions before 1959 and the amateur or KFK competitions after 1964.

- Stalinets Kharkiv (KhEMZ), 1936, 1937
- Kupiansk, 1936–1938
- Lokomotyv Kharkiv, 1938, 1939
- Lokomotyv Lozova, 1938, 1956, 1958, 1959
- Zenit Kharkiv, 1940
- Dzerzhynets Kharkiv, 1946, 1951, 1952
- Silmash Kharkiv, 1946
- Zdorovia Kharkiv, 1946
- Traktor Kharkiv, 1947, 1951
- Torpedo Kharkiv, 1948, 1950, 1952–1959
- Spartak Kharkiv, 1948, 1957, 1959, 1975
- Dynamo Kharkiv, 1948, 1957
- Kharchovyk Kupyansk, 1948
- Lokomotyv Izyum, 1948, 1949
- Chervonyi Prapor Kharkiv, 1949
- Lokomotyv Kupyansk, 1949, 1965, 1967, 2004 – 2013
- Spartak Kupyansk, 1949
- Dzerzhynskyi Raion Kharkiv, 1950
- Kahanovych Raion Kharkiv, 1950
- Iskra Kharkiv, 1951
- Enerhia Kharkiv, 1954–1956
- Chuhuiv, 1957–1959
- Donetsk Izyum, 1957, 1970
- Avanhard Kharkiv, 1958
- Start Chuhuiv, 1964, 1966
- Yupiter Kharkiv, 1968 – 1971, 1979 – 1981, 1993/94, 1994/95
- Lokomotyv Paniutyne, 1972
- Metalurh Kupiansk, 1973 – 1994/95
- Mashynobudivnyk Zmiiv, 1973
- Lokomotyv Lyubotyn, 1974
- Hazovyk Shebelynka, 1975
- Avanhard Lozova, 1976 – 1981, 1984 – 1994/95, 2023/24, 2024/25
- Kolos Zolochiv, 1978, 1979
- Avanhard Derhachi, 1979 – 1982, 1984
- Start Kharkiv, 1980, 1987
- ShVSM Kharkiv, 1983
- Trudovi Rezervy Kharkiv, 1985
- Tsementnyk Balakliya, 1986, 1988 – 1990, 1992/93
- Kolos Krasnohrad, 1989
- Kolos Kirova Kolomak, 1990, 1991
- Fakel Krasnohrad, 1990, 1991
- Oskil Kupiansk, 1992/93
- Avanhard Merefa, 1993/94 – 1995/96
- Vlasko Hlyboke, 1994/95
- Krystal Parkhomivka, 1996/97 – 1999
- Enerhetyk Komsomolske, 1996/97 – 1998/99
- FC Kharkiv, 1998/99
- Arsenal/Arsenal-2 Kharkiv, 1999, 2000, 2012
- Metalist/Metalist-3 Kharkiv, 1999
- Solli Plius Kharkiv, 1999, 2014, 2016/17
- Olimpik Kharkiv, 2001
- Helios Kharkiv, 2003
- Hazovyk Kharkiv, 2003
- Lokomotyv Dvorichna, 2006
- Kolos Zachepylivka, 2015
- Metalist 1925 Kharkiv, 2016/17
- Kvadro Pervomaiskyi, 2016/17
- Kobra Kharkiv, 2018/19
- FC Vovchansk, 2019/20, 2020/21

== Notable footballers ==
=== Soviet Union national football team ===
- Volodymyr Bezsonov
- Yuriy Istomin
- Eduard Dubinskiy
- Yuriy Susloparov
- Oleksandr Tkachenko

=== Ukraine national football team ===
- Maksym Kalynychenko
- Artem Byesyedin
- Andriy Lunin
- Serhiy Shyshchenko
- Ivan Kalyuzhnyi
- Oleksandr Hladkyi
- Andriy Dykan
- Valeriy Bondar
- Ihor Kutyepov
- Oleksandr Pomazun
- Dmytro Kryskiv
- Oleksandr Horyainov
- Denys Kulakov
- Serhiy Symonenko
- Artem Putivtsev

== See also ==
- FFU Council of Regions
