= Oleksandr Zozulia (footballer, born 1960) =

Ukrainian footballer (born 1960)

Personal information
- Full name: Oleksandr Andriiovych Zozulia
- Date of birth: 7 March 1960 (age 66)
- Place of birth: Khrustalnyi, Ukrainian SSR, Soviet Union
- Position: Midfielder

Team information
- Current team: Kremin-2 Kremenchuk (coach)

Senior career*
Years	Team	Apps	(Gls)
1977	Zaria Voroshilovgrad		
1978	Sever Murmansk	11	(0)
1981	Sokil Rovenky	19	(4)
1982	Stakhanov	35	(6)
1983	Atlantyka Sevastopol	34	(0)
1985	Kolos Pavlohrad	25	(7)
1986	Sudnobudivnyk Mykolaiv	6	(0)
1986	Luch Krasnyi Luch		
1986	Nistru Chisinau	18	(0)
1987	Sudnobudivnyk Mykolaiv	27	(0)
1988	Baltika Kaliningrad	25	(7)
1990	Shakhtar Krasnyi Luch	23	(14)
1992	Hirnyk Hirne	3	(0)
1992–1994	Koral Krasnyi Luch	16	(0)
1995–1996	Vodeiar Kremenchuk (futsal)	2	(0)
1995	Hirnyk-Sport Komsomolsk	1	(0)
1996–1997	Shakhtar Krasnyi Luch	16	(3)
- * Club domestic league appearances and goals

Oleksandr Zozulia (Ukrainian: Олександр Андрійович Зозуля; born 7 March 1960) is a Ukrainian professional football coach and former player who played as a midfielder. He is current coach of a Second League club Kremin-2 Kremenchuk.

== Early life ==
Oleksandr Zozulia was born on 7 March 1960 in Khrustalnyi, Ukrainian SSR, Soviet Union.

== Playing career ==
Zozulia played for Stakhanov in 1982, Atlantyka Sevastopol in 1983, Kolos Pavlohrad in 1985, Nistru Chișinău in 1986, Sudnobudivnyk Mykolaiv in 1987 and others. In 1996 he won Luhansk Oblast Championship while playing for Shakhtar Krasnyi Luch.

== Coaching career ==
Zozulia coached with Atlank Kremenchuk, Kremin Academy and Dnipro Academy.

=== Kremenchuk Academy ===
When Kremin Kremenchuk was formed again on 23 October 2003, Zozulia became one of the academy coaches. He began training group of players born in 1992. Andriy Batsula and Artem Kozlov were first players who Zozulia trained.

By May 2017 he returned to Kremin Academy. There he began coaching Academy group Kremin 2006. He continued to coach them until 2022. With Russian invasion of Ukraine some of his players moved to academies in Poland and Slovakia while others who remained in the academy began training with and playing for Kremin Kremenchuk. In October 2021 Zozulia began working with a new group of players born in 2016.

=== Dnipro ===
Zozulia joined Dnipro Academy in 2010 and was in charge of the U15 team.

=== Kremin-2 ===
Zozulia began working with Kremin-2 Kremenchuk in mid January 2023. On 15 February 2023 Kremin owner appointed Yaroslav Zdyrko to become a manager of the team, Zozulia remained an assistant coach with the team. Most of the players came from the Kremin Academy and were coached by Zozulia from early age.

== Honours ==
Shakhtar Krasnyi Luch

- Luhansk Oblast Championship: 1996
