= 1973 Football Cup of Ukrainian SSR among KFK =

1973 Ukrainian Amateur Cup
Tournament details
- Country: Soviet Union (Ukrainian SSR)

Final positions
- Champions: FC Sokil Lviv
- Runners-up: FC Shakhtar Sverdlovsk

The 1973 Football Cup of Ukrainian SSR among KFK was the annual season of Ukraine's football knockout competition for amateur football teams.

== Competition schedule ==
=== First qualification round ===
Team 1	Score	Team 2
FC Silmash Nizhyn	5–6	FC Promin Poltava
FC Portovyk Illichivsk	0–1	FC Avanhard Simferopol (reserves)
FC Hranit Cherkasy	9–0	FC Refryzherator Fastiv
FC Shakhtar Sverdlovsk	2–1	FC Hirnyk Dniprorudne
FC Bilshovyk Kyiv	1–2	FC Elektrovymiriuvach Zhytomyr
FC Kirovets Makiivka	1–0	FC Atlantyka Sevastopol (reserves)
FC Sluch Krasyliv	5–1	FC Karpaty Kuty
FC Donets Izyum	2–0	FC Chervona Strila Kyiv
FC Torpedo Rivne	4–2	FC Budivelnyk Chernivtsi
FC Svema Shostka	2–0	FC Avanhard Derhachi
FC Khvylia Mykolaiv	3–1	FC Khimik Horlivka
FC Motor Chortkiv	1–0	FC Lokomotyv Mukachevo
FC Avtomobilist Tulchyn	3–2	FC Tsementnyk Mykolaiv
FC Silbud Henichesk	1–5	FC Shakhtar Oleksandriya
FC Sokil Lviv	2–0	FC Silmash Kovel

=== Second qualification round ===
Team 1	Score	Team 2
FC Avtomobilist Tulchyn	1–4	FC Elektrovymiriuvach Zhytomyr
FC Promin Poltava	0–1	FC Avanhard Kryvyi Rih (reserves)
FC Sluch Krasyliv	2–0	FC Motor Chortkiv
FC Avanhard Simferopol (reserves)	0–2	FC Kirovets Makiivka
FC Shakhtar Sverdlovsk	2–1	FC Svema Shostka
FC Shakhtar Oleksandriya	4–0	FC Khvylia Mykolaiv
FC Hranit Cherkasy	2–1	FC Donets Izyum
FC Sokil Lviv	2–0	FC Torpedo Rivne

=== Quarterfinals (1/4) ===
Team 1	Score	Team 2
FC Sluch Krasyliv	1–2	FC Sokil Lviv
FC Shakhtar Sverdlovsk	3–1	FC Avanhard Kryvyi Rih (reserves)
FC Shakhtar Oleksandriya	3–2	FC Kirovets Makiivka
FC Hranit Cherkasy	5–1	FC Elektrovymiriuvach Zhytomyr

=== Semifinals (1/2) ===
Team 1	Score	Team 2
FC Sokil Lviv	2–0	FC Hranit Cherkasy
FC Shakhtar Sverdlovsk	1–1	FC Shakhtar Oleksandriya

Replay

Team 1	Score	Team 2
FC Shakhtar Sverdlovsk	2–1	FC Shakhtar Oleksandriya

=== Final ===
October 20

Team 1	Score	Team 2
FC Sokil Lviv	2–0	FC Shakhtar Sverdlovsk

== See also ==
- 1973 KFK competitions (Ukraine)
