= FC Avanhard Lozova =

Avanhard
- Full name: FC Avanhard Lozova
- Founded: 1969; 2021
- Dissolved: 2008
- Ground: Stadium Molodizhnyi
- Capacity: 680
- Chairman: (Ukraine) Vasyl Levchenko
- Head coach: (Ukraine) Ihor Rakhayev
- League: Ukrainian Second League
- 2025–26: Ukrainian Football Amateur League, Quarterfinals
Home colours	Away colours

FC Avanhard Lozova (Ukrainian: Футбольний клуб «Авангард» (Лозова)) is a Ukrainian football from Lozova. Due to the Russo-Ukrainian War, they play their home matches in Yuriivka, Dnipropetrovsk Oblast and compete in the Dnipropetrovsk Oblast football championship.

Created in 1969, they, for most of their history, played at amateur level (or KFK competitions) until 2026. Just before the dissolution of the Soviet Union, Avanhard were among the better KFK teams from Ukraine, qualifying for 3 Soviet Cups for KFK teams.

In 2026, FC Avanhard was admitted to the 2026–27 Ukrainian Second League.

== History ==
The club appeared sometime after 1969. They made their first appearance in the Ukrainian Cup (Football Cup of the Ukrainian SSR) in 1974, when they were defeated by Promin Poltava 1:3, in the first round of the competition. In 1976, Avanhard made their debut at the all-Republican competitions, 1976 Ukrainian championship for KFK. They placed fourth in their group among 10 participants, yielding the third place to Kirovets Makiivka on a goal difference.

The first success came to the club (at that time the KFK team) in 1988, when they defeated Zirka Berdychiv on penalties in the Ukrainian Cup final. The win earned them qualification for the Soviet Cups for KFK teams for the first time. They also placed 2nd in their group during the 1988 Ukrainian KFK competitions, being their highest achievement in the competition. The next year, 1989, they once again reached the Ukrainian Cup final, yet this time were defeated by another team from Berdychiv, Prohres. Along with Prohres, they qualified for the Soviet Cups for KFK teams again.

On 1 August 1992, Avanhard took part in the 1992–93 Ukrainian Cup, a reformed Ukrainian cup competition. They lost their first game at home against Naftovyk Okhtyrka 0:1. Next year on 1 August, Avanhard took part in the 1993–94 Ukrainian Cup and, in the Round 1 match against Avtomobilist Sumy, they lost it 0:2 at home. After the 1994–95 season, Avanhard stopped participating in the All-Ukrainian competitions and played at the regional level until they folded in 2006.

The club was revived in 2021. Before the full-scale Russian invasion of Ukraine, the club had intentions to apply for the Ukrainian Second League (professional level), but had to postpone and were forced to relocate to Dnipropetrovsk Oblast. On 22 May 2023, the club signed Ihor Rakhayev as a head coach, who previously coached several clubs from Kharkiv. In 2023, Avanhard Lozova resumed their participation in the All-Ukrainian football competitions. In the winter of 2024, Oleksandr Hladkyi became the club's playing sports director. In their first season after the return, they placed 8th in their group among 9 participants. However, in the next season, they placed 3rd, ahead of Rebel Kyiv, and qualified for the post-season play-offs. In summer 2025, Yevhen Selin and Denys Oliynyk moved to the club.

== League and cup history ==
Season	Div.	Pos.	Pl.	W	D	L	GS	GA	P	Domestic Cup	Europe		Notes
2023–24	4th (Amateur League:Group 2)	8_{/9}	16	3	3	10	20	35	12	-	-	-	
2024–25	4th (Amateur League:Group 2)	3_{/10}	18	11	3	4	30	17	36	-	-	-	Final stage:Quarterfinals-Dnister Zalishchyky 2-1 0-2 (2-3)
2025–26	4th (Amateur League:Group 2)	1_{/9}	16	11	3	2	44	18	36	-	-	-	Final stage:Quarterfinals-FC Mykolaiv 3-1; Semifinals-Kormil Yavoriv 2-1 (3-4p) Admission to Ukrainian Second League
2026–27	3th (Second League:Group B)	4_{/9}	11	5	1	5	11	13	16	Round of 64 (1/32)	-	-	TBD

== Honours ==
- Ukrainian Amateur Cup
  - Winners (1): 2025–26
- Football Cup of the Ukrainian SSR
  - Winners (1): 1988
  - Runners-up (1): 1989
- Kharkiv Oblast Championship
  - Winners (4): 1982, 1983, 1988, 1992
  - Runners-up (9): 1975, 1976, 1979, 1986, 1987, 1989, 1997, 2002, 2003
- Kharkiv Oblast Cup
  - Winners (6): 1983, 1986, 1987, 1988, 1990, 1991
  - Finalist (5): 1978, 1982, 1995–96, 1999, 2005
