= 1964 KFK competitions (Ukraine) =

Ukrainian SSR football tournament for the KFK teams' primacy
- Season: 1964
- Dates: 6 September – 18 October (first stage); 29 October – 5 November (final group)
- Teams: 26
- Champions: Enerhiya Nova Kakhovka
- Promoted: Shakhtar Krasnyi Luch

The 1964 Ukrainian SSR football tournament for the KFK teams (Russian: Первенство УССР среди КФК) was the inaugural football competition for physical culture collectives that was held in the Ukrainian SSR (Ukraine). Each region of Ukraine delegated one team to the competition.

The winner of the competition, Enerhiya Nova Kakhovka, was not promoted to the 1965 Ukrainian Class B (Soviet Class B, III tier). Instead of them, to Class B were promoted the 2nd-place runner-up, Shakhtar Krasnyi Luch.

== Teams ==
In total, 26 participants took part in this season's competition. Many former participants (10) of the 1959 Football Championship of the Ukrainian SSR joined this season's competition. Besides them, several (16) new teams made their debut this season.

- Debut: Strila Zaporizhia, Kolhosp Ukrayina Yarke Pole, Shakhtar Krasnyi Luch, Suputnyk Poltava, Elektron Romny, Start Chuhuiv, Burevisnyk Vinnytsia, Podillia Kamianets-Podilskyi, Torpedo Odesa, Kolhospnyk Kitsman, Prohres Berdychiv, Voskhod Kyiv, Tekstylnyk Rivno, LVVPU, Budivelnyk Khust, Lokomotyv Kovel
- Renamed: Avanhard Mykolaiv → Torpedo Mykolaiv, Avanhard Druzhkivka → Mashynobudivnyk Druzhkivka, KremHESbud → Dnipro KremHES
  - Avanhard Pryluky competed as Avanhard Ladan

=== Location of teams ===
Locations of teams

== Group stage ==
=== Group 1 ===
Pos	Team	Pld	W	D	L	GF	GA	GD	Pts	Qualification
1	Enerhiya Nova Kakhovka	6	4	1	1	8	3	+5	9	Advanced to Final
2	Strila Zaporizhia	6	3	1	2	7	4	+3	7	
3	Kolhosp Ukrayina Yarke Pole	6	2	1	3	5	7	−2	5	withdrew
4	Torpedo Mykolaiv	6	1	1	4	3	9	−6	3	

Source: ukr-football.org.ua

=== Group 2 ===
Pos	Team	Pld	W	D	L	GF	GA	GD	Pts	Qualification
1	Shakhtar Krasnyi Luch	6	4	2	0	5	0	+5	10	Advanced to Final
2	Suputnyk Poltava	6	3	1	2	6	5	+1	7	withdrew
3	Start Chuhuyiv	6	2	2	2	6	4	+2	6	withdrew
4	Elektron Romny	6	0	1	5	1	9	−8	1	withdrew

Source: ukr-football.org.ua

=== Group 3 ===
Pos	Team	Pld	W	D	L	GF	GA	GD	Pts	Qualification
1	Avanhard Ordzhonikidze	6	5	1	0	11	3	+8	11	Advanced to Final
2	Mashynobudivnyk Druzhkivka	6	2	3	1	8	8	0	7	withdrew
3	Shakhtar Vatutine	6	1	2	3	8	8	0	4	withdrew
4	Dnipro KremHES (Note: In 1962-1969 Svitlovodsk carried the name KremHES.)	6	0	2	4	1	9	−8	2	withdrew

Source: ukr-football.org.ua

=== Group 4 ===
Pos	Team	Pld	W	D	L	GF	GA	GD	Pts	Qualification
1	Burevisnyk Vinnytsia	6	6	0	0	14	1	+13	12	Advanced to Final
2	Podillya Kamianets-Podilskyi	6	2	2	2	8	10	−2	6	
3	Torpedo Odessa	6	2	1	3	15	9	+6	5	withdrew
4	Kolhospnyk Kitsman	6	0	1	5	2	19	−17	1	withdrew

Source: ukr-football.org.ua

=== Group 5 ===
Pos	Team	Pld	W	D	L	GF	GA	GD	Pts	Qualification
1	Avanhard Ladan	8	6	0	2	22	9	+13	12	Advanced to Final
2	Prohres Berdychiv	8	5	1	2	13	13	0	11	
3	Spartak Bila Tserkva	8	4	1	3	13	11	+2	9	
4	Voskhod Kyiv	8	2	1	5	9	14	−5	5	withdrew
5	Tekstylshchyk Rivne	8	1	1	6	9	19	−10	3	

Source: ukr-football.org.ua

=== Group 6 ===
Pos	Team	Pld	W	D	L	GF	GA	GD	Pts	Qualification
1	LVVPU SA I VMF	8	5	2	1	13	3	+10	12	Advanced to Final
2	Budivelnyk Khust	8	3	3	2	14	8	+6	9	
3	Khimik Kalush	8	2	3	3	10	10	0	7	
4	Druzhba Chortkiv	8	2	2	4	10	6	+4	6	withdrew
5	Lokomotyv Kovel	8	2	2	4	7	27	−20	6	withdrew

Source: ukr-football.org.ua

== Final ==
Final stage was taking place on 29 October – 5 November 1964 in cities of Kakhovka and Nova Kakhovka.

Pos	Team	Pld	W	D	L	GF	GA	GD	Pts	Promotion
1	Enerhiya Nova Kakhovka (C)	5	4	0	1	8	3	+5	8	
2	Shakhtar Krasnyi Luch	5	2	3	0	5	3	+2	7	Promoted to the Ukrainian Class B
3	LVVPU SA and VMF	5	2	1	2	9	6	+3	5	
4	Avanhard Ordzhonikidze	5	2	1	2	9	8	+1	5	withdrew
5	Burevisnyk Vinnytsia	5	1	1	3	2	10	−8	3	withdrew
6	Avanhard Ladan	5	1	0	4	4	7	−3	2	withdrew

Source: ukr-football.org.ua
(C) Champions

=== Results ===
Home \ Away	ENK	SKL	LVP	AVN	BUR	AVL
Enerhiya Nova Kakhovka		0–2	1–0	2–1	1–0	4–0
Shakhtar Krasnyi Luch			2–2	1–1	0–0	+/-
LVVPU Lviv				0–2	4–0	3–1
Avanhard Ordzhonikidze					5–2	0–3
Burevisnyk Vinnytsia						+/-
Avanhard Ladan						

Source: Calendar (in Russian)
Legend: Blue = home team win; Yellow = draw; Red = away team win.

== Post-season events ==
=== Promotion playoffs ===
The following teams qualified for the promotion playoffs against the 1964 Class B teams: Lokomotyv Smila, Bilshovyk Kyiv, Taksomotor Odesa, Enerhiya Nova Kakhovka, Strila Zaporizhia, Naftovyk Dolyna, SGUR [RDUR] Dymytrov, Elektron Romny, Shakhtar Novovolynsk, Vympel Mykolaiv, Kolhospnyk Derhachi, Podillia Kamianets-Podilskyi.

=== Promotion ===
Only one team was promoted to the 1965 Ukrainian Class B.

- Shakhtar Krasnyi Luch

Besides Shakhtar, the following teams promoted to Class B were those that did not participate in the KFK competitions:

- Avtomobilist Odesa
- Shakhtar Torez

== See also ==
- 1964 Ukrainian Class B
- 1964 Football Cup of Ukrainian SSR among KFK
- 1959 Football Championship of the Ukrainian SSR
