= 1955 Cup of the Ukrainian SSR =

The 1955 Ukrainian Cup was a football knockout competition conducting by the Football Federation of the Ukrainian SSR and was known as the Ukrainian Cup.

== Teams ==
=== Non-participating teams ===
The Ukrainian teams of masters did not take part in the competition.

- 1955 Soviet Class A (2): FC Dynamo Kyiv, FC Shakhtar Stalino
- 1955 Soviet Class B (7): ODO Kiev, ODO Lvov, FC Metalurh Zaporizhia, FC Lokomotyv Kharkiv, FC Metalurh Dnipropetrovsk, FC Kharchovyk Odesa, FC Spartak Uzhhorod

== Competition schedule ==
=== First elimination round ===
Mashynobudivnyk Kyiv (Rep)	2:1	(Rep) Dynamo Ternopil
Dynamo Khmelnytskyi (Rep)	0:0	Stanislav team (Note: In 1955 Football Championship of the Ukrainian SSR, Group 6 played Spartak Stanislav that won republican competitions that year. The team was then promoted to competitions among teams of masters for the 1956 Class B season.)	1:0 (replay)
Kolhospnyk Poltava (Rep)	2:0	Kharchovyk Smila
Lokomotyv Kyiv (Rep)	3:1	(Rep) Chernihiv team
FC Torpedo Sumy (Rep)	3:1	Vinnytsia team (Note: In 1955 Football Championship of the Ukrainian SSR, Group 1 played Burevisnyk Vinnytsia.)
FC Dynamo Zhytomyr (Rep)	4:0	FC Dynamo Rivno (Note: In 1955 Football Championship of the Ukrainian SSR, Group 1 played Urozhai Rovno.)
FC Naftovyk Drohobych (Rep)	3:2	(Rep) FC Dynamo Chernivtsi
FC Chervona Zirka Uzhhorod	4:2	(Rep) FC Torpedo Lviv
FC Lokomotyv Artemivsk (Rep)	7:0	FC Urozhai Kirovohrad (Note: In 1955 Football Championship of the Ukrainian SSR, Group 2 played Torpedo Kirovohrad.)	in Stalino
FC Enerhiya Kharkiv (Rep)	0:1	(Rep) Zaporizhia team
FC Shakhtar Kadiivka (Rep)	2:0	Sevastopol team (Note: In 1955 Football Championship of the Ukrainian SSR, Group 4 played Avanhard Sevastopol.)
FC Mashynobudivnyk Dnipropetrovsk (Note: In 1955 Football Championship of the Ukrainian SSR, Group 2 played Dnipropetrovsk team.)	4:3	Yevpatoria team
FC Metalurh Odessa (Note: Last season as a team of masters, Metalurh Odesa competed in the 1954 Soviet Class B. In 1955 it competed only in cup competitions.)	+:–	(Rep) FC Dynamo Lutsk	(did not appear)
FC Torpedo Kharkiv (Rep)	0:2	FC Avanhard Kherson (Note: In 1955 Football Championship of the Ukrainian SSR, Group 4 played Spartak Kherson.)
FC Torpedo Fastiv	0:1	(Rep) FC Metalurh Horlivka
FC Chervonyi Styah Mykolaiv (Note: In 1955 Football Championship of the Ukrainian SSR, Group 2 played Budivelnyk Mykolaiv and in Group 4 played Avanhard Mykolaiv.)	3:4	(Rep) FC Khimik Dniprodzerzhynsk

=== Second elimination round ===
FC Kolhospnyk Poltava (Rep)	3:0	(Rep) FC Lokomotyv Kyiv	0:1 (replay)
FC Torpedo Sumy (Rep)	2:1	(Rep) FC Dynamo Zhytomyr
FC Mashynobudivnyk Kyiv (Rep)	2:1	(Rep) FC Dynamo Khmelnytskyi
FC Naftovyk Drohobych (Rep)	1:3	FC Chervona Zirka Uzhhorod	(Naftovyk advances)
Zaporizhia team (Rep)	2:5	(Rep) FC Lokomotyv Artemivsk
FC Shakhtar Kadiivka (Rep)	3:0	FC Mashynobudivnyk Dnipropetrovsk
FC Metalurh Odessa	0:0	FC Avanhard Kherson	4:3 (replay)
FC Metalurh Horlivka (Rep)	2:0	(Rep) FC Khimik Dniprodzerzhynsk

=== Quarterfinals ===
FC Kolhospnyk Poltava (Rep)	0:2	(Rep) FC Torpedo Sumy
FC Mashynobudivnyk Kyiv (Rep)	4:1	(Rep) FC Naftovyk Drohobych
FC Lokomotyv Artemivsk (Rep)	7:1	(Rep) FC Shakhtar Kadiivka	in Stalino
FC Metalurh Odessa	2:1	(Rep) FC Metalurh Horlivka

=== Semifinals ===
FC Torpedo Sumy (Rep)	0:1	(Rep) FC Mashynobudivnyk Kyiv
FC Lokomotyv Artemivsk (Rep)	3:2	FC Metalurh Odessa	in Stalino

=== Final ===
The final was held in Kiev.

19 June 1955

FC Mashynobudivnyk Kyiv (Rep)	2–1	(Rep) FC Lokomotyv Artemivsk

Kiev

== Top goalscorers ==
Scorer	Goals	Team
(Ukrainian Soviet Socialist Republic)	?	

Ukrainian Cup 1955 Winners

FC Mashynobudivnyk Kyiv
Second title

== See also ==
- Soviet Cup
- Ukrainian Cup
