= Yuriy Rudynskyi =

Ukrainian association football player

Personal information
- Full name: Yuriy Mykolayovych Rudynskyi
- Date of birth: 14 January 1962 (age 64)
- Place of birth: Ukrainian SSR
- Height: 1.79 m (5 ft 10 1/2 in)
- Positions: Midfielder; forward

Youth career
- Voroshylovhrad sports boarding school

Senior career*
Years	Team	Apps	(Gls)
1980	Metalist Kharkiv	1	(0)
1981	Atlantyka Sevastopol	23	(1)
1982–1985	Mayak Kharkiv	159	(20)
1986–1987	Kryvbas Kryvyi Rih	77	(4)
1988	Kremin Kremenchuk	?	(2)
1989	Metalurh Kupiansk	?	(?)
1990	Mayak Kharkiv	35	(7)
1991	Torpedo Zaporizhzhia	12	(2)
1991–1992	Energomash Belgorod	25	(2)
1993–1995	Avanhard Merefa (amateur)		

Managerial career
- 2009–2012: Metalist Kharkiv academy (coach)
- 2012–2015: Metalist Kharkiv double/U-19
- 2015–2016: Metalist Kharkiv U-21 (assistant)
- 2016: SK Metalist Kharkiv
- 2018: FC Kobra Kharkiv
- * Club domestic league appearances and goals

Yuriy Rudynskyi (Ukrainian: Юрій Миколайович Рудинський; born 14 January 1962) is a former football player and current manager.

He played for FC Mayak Kharkiv, FC Kryvbas Kryvyi Rih, FC Energomash Belgorod and FC Atlantyka Sevastopol, and he coached several junior teams of FC Metalist Kharkiv.
