= 1964 Football Cup of Ukrainian SSR among KFK =

1964 Football Cup of the Ukrainian SSR
Russian: Кубок УССР (Note: Яцына Ю.А., стр. 52)

Tournament details
- Country: Soviet Union (Ukrainian SSR)
- Dates: 1 August – 13 September
- Teams: 26

Final positions
- Champions: Bilshovyk Kyiv
- Runners-up: Avanhard Dnipropetrovsk

The 1964 Football Cup of the Ukrainian SSR (Ukrainian: Кубок УРСР з футболу) was the 26th annual season of Ukraine's republican football knockout competition.

Since 1957, the competition has fed into the Soviet Amateur Cup. All quarterfinalists qualified for the Soviet Amateur Cup: Bilshovyk Kyiv, Avanhard Dnipropetrovsk, Zirka Kotovsk, Tytan Zaporizhia, Avanhard Kremenchuk (Kryukiv).

== Competition schedule ==
=== Round One (1 круг) ===
Team 1	Score	Team 2
Druzhba Chortkiv	+/-	Volodymyr-Volynskyi
Shakhtar Vatutine	0–5	FC Enerhiya Nova Kakhovka
Dynamo Rivno	6–3	Strila Izyaslav
Prylad Mukachevo	1–1	Lisokombinat Broshniv
FC Spartak Chernihiv	2–1	Hvardiya Romny
Elektrovymiryuvach Zhytomyr	2–1	Vostok Mohyliv-Podilskyi

Replay

Team 1	Score	Team 2
Prylad Mukachevo	1–1	Lisokombinat Broshniv
Prylad Mukachevo	1–0	Lisokombinat Broshniv

=== Round Two (2 круг) ===
Team 1	Score	Team 2
FC Avanhard Dnipropetrovsk	5–0	FC Torpedo Feodosia
FC Enerhiya Nova Kakhovka	2–0	FC Temp Bila Tserkva
FC Shakhtar Torez	2–0	FC Dnipro KremHES
FC Dynamo Rivno	0–1	FC Tytan Zaporizhia
FC Prylad Mukachevo	1–3	FC Bilshovyk Kyiv
FC Druzhba Chortkiv	4–1	FC Promin Lviv
FC Spartak Chernihiv	0–3	FC Avanhard Kryukiv
FC Shakhtar Krasnodon	4–1	FC Mayak Kharkiv
FC Elektrovymiryuvach Zhytomyr	0–2	FC Zirka Kotovsk
FC Mashynobudivnyk Chernivtsi	0–2	FC Vympel Mykolaiv

=== Round Three (3 круг) ===
Team 1	Score	Team 2
FC Enerhiya Nova Kakhovka	0–3	FC Avanhard Dnipropetrovsk
FC Tytan Zaporizhia	2–1	FC Shakhtar Torez
FC Bilshovyk Kyiv	2–0	FC Druzhba Chortkiv
FC Avanhard Kryukiv	3–0	FC Shakhtar Krasnodon
FC Vympel Mykolaiv	0–1	FC Zirka Kotovsk

=== Quarterfinals (1/4 финала) ===
Team 1	Score	Team 2
FC Bilshovyk Kyiv	4–0	FC Avanhard Kryukiv

=== Semifinals (1/2 финала) ===
Team 1	Score	Team 2
FC Avanhard Dnipropetrovsk	3–2	FC Tytan Zaporizhzhia
FC Zirka Kotovsk	0–4	FC Bilshovyk Kyiv

=== Final (Финал) ===
Team 1	Score	Team 2
FC Avanhard Dnipropetrovsk	0–1	FC Bilshovyk Kyiv

=== Champions' roster (Bilshovyk Kyiv) ===
- Players: Evdokimov, Denisov, Rudevskiy, Polischuk, Bondarenko, Shinkarenko, Kabanets, Syadosyan, Lyusin, Primak, Dneprov, Sobolevskiy, Trubitsyn, Kudryavkin, Zaika, Chichkin.
- Head coach: L. D. Koval.

== See also ==
- 1964 KFK competitions (Ukraine)
