= 1959 Football Championship of the Ukrainian SSR =

Football Championship of UkrSSR
- Season: 1959
- Dates: July 5 – October 31
- Champions: Avanhard Zhovti Vody

The 1959 Football Championship of UkrSSR were part of the 1959 Soviet republican football competitions in the Soviet Ukraine. This was the last time such competitions were conducted at this level. The next season competitions were merged with Class B competitions.

Some 80 teams participated this season and were originally split into 10 groups of eight teams each. The first stage lasted from July 5 to October 4. Winners of all qualification groups formed two semifinal groups which were taking place in Kharkiv and Drohobych on October 17-24. Top two team of semifinal groups proceeded to the final group which was taking place in Kyiv on October 28-31. All final group participants were admitted to the 1960 Ukrainian Class B except for SKVO Odesa, a team of which already competed at team of master's at the level. In addition, eight more teams were admitted to the Class B including six teams from qualification groups.

Following this season, there were established such teams of masters in Ukraine such as FC Mariupol, FC Volyn Lutsk, FC Podillya Khmelnytskyi, FC Avanhard Sumy, FC Desna Chernihiv.

There also were some clone teams that competed at republican level as well as the All-Union level, among which are Avanhard Mykolaiv, SKVO Odesa, Avanhard Simferopol, Chervona Zirka Kirovohrad.

== Teams ==
- Debut: Khimik Makiivka, Avanhard Dniprodzerzhynsk, Komintern Q/A Kryvyi Rih, KremHESbud, Chervona Zirka Kirovohrad, Avanhard Voznesensk, Avanhard Uman, Avanhard Sumy, Kolhospnyk-2 Poltava, Avanhard Malyn, Chervonohvardiyets Odesa
- Returning: Enerhiya Nova Kakhovka (one season), Shakhtar Rutchenkove (seven seasons), Avanhard Simferopol (one season), Spartak Kharkiv (one season), Avanhard Druzhkivka (19 seasons), Avanhard Pryluky (one season), Vodnyk Izmail (six seasons)
- Renamed: Ordzhonikidze Factory Chasiv Yar → Avanhard Chasiv Yar, Avanhard Chernihiv → Chernihiv, Avanhard Mohyliv-Podilskyi → Mohyliv-Podilskyi, Vinnytsia → Avanhard Vinnytsia

=== Location map ===
Locations of teams in Ukrainian Championship

== Qualification groups ==
=== Group 1 ===
| Pos | Team | Pld | W | D | L | GF | GA | GD | Pts | Qualification |
|---|---|---|---|---|---|---|---|---|---|---|
| 1 | Budivelnyk Zaporizhia | 14 | 10 | 1 | 3 | 35 | 11 | +24 | 21 | Advanced to Semifinals |
| 2 | Avanhard Zhdanov | 14 | 10 | 1 | 3 | 24 | 9 | +15 | 21 | Admitted to Class B |
| 3 | Avanhard Mykolaiv (klubnaya) | 14 | 7 | 2 | 5 | 31 | 20 | +11 | 16 | |
| 4 | Metalurh Nikopol | 14 | 7 | 2 | 5 | 19 | 13 | +6 | 16 | |
| 5 | Avanhard Velykyi Tokmak | 14 | 6 | 2 | 6 | 22 | 27 | −5 | 14 | |
| 6 | Enerhiya Nova Kakhovka | 14 | 4 | 5 | 5 | 19 | 29 | −10 | 13 | |
| 7 | Avanhard Kherson | 14 | 3 | 2 | 9 | 9 | 23 | −14 | 8 | |
| 8 | Avanhard Sevastopol | 14 | 0 | 3 | 11 | 14 | 41 | −27 | 3 | |

Last season: Budivelnyk Zaporizhia, Avanhard Velykyi Tokmak, Avanhard Kherson

=== Group 2 ===
| Pos | Team | Pld | W | D | L | GF | GA | GD | Pts | Qualification |
|---|---|---|---|---|---|---|---|---|---|---|
| 1 | Burevisnyk Melitopol | 14 | 11 | 1 | 2 | 28 | 7 | +21 | 23 | Advanced to Semifinals |
| 2 | Metalurh Kerch | 14 | 7 | 3 | 4 | 29 | 18 | +11 | 17 | |
| 3 | Mashynobudivnyk Zaporizhia | 14 | 7 | 2 | 5 | 26 | 23 | +3 | 16 | |
| 4 | Mashynobudivnyk Dnipropetrovsk | 14 | 5 | 6 | 3 | 15 | 14 | +1 | 16 | |
| 5 | Shakhtar Rutchenkove | 14 | 6 | 3 | 5 | 18 | 15 | +3 | 15 | |
| 6 | Avanhard Ordzhonikidze | 14 | 6 | 2 | 6 | 23 | 16 | +7 | 14 | |
| 7 | Avanhard Berdyansk | 14 | 4 | 3 | 7 | 16 | 29 | −13 | 11 | |
| 8 | Avanhard Simferopol (klubnaya) | 14 | 0 | 3 | 11 | 14 | 41 | −27 | 3 | |

Last season: Burevisnyk Melitopol, Mashynobudivnyk Zaporizhia, Mashynobudivnyk Dnipropetrovsk, Shakhtar Rutchenkove, Avanhard Berdiansk

=== Group 3 ===
| Pos | Team | Pld | W | D | L | GF | GA | GD | Pts | Qualification |
|---|---|---|---|---|---|---|---|---|---|---|
| 1 | Spartak Kharkiv | 14 | 9 | 4 | 1 | 26 | 14 | +12 | 22 | Advanced to Semifinals |
| 2 | Avanhard Chasiv Yar | 14 | 8 | 2 | 4 | 18 | 8 | +10 | 18 | |
| 3 | Metalurh Voroshylovsk | 14 | 6 | 5 | 3 | 26 | 20 | +6 | 17 | |
| 4 | Shakhtar Bryanka | 14 | 6 | 3 | 5 | 20 | 13 | +7 | 15 | |
| 5 | Khimik Rubizhne | 14 | 5 | 4 | 5 | 18 | 19 | −1 | 14 | |
| 6 | Lokomotyv Lozova | 14 | 3 | 4 | 7 | 15 | 22 | −7 | 10 | |
| 7 | Avanhard Yenakieve | 14 | 3 | 3 | 8 | 16 | 28 | −12 | 9 | |
| 8 | Avanhard Kramatorsk | 14 | 2 | 3 | 9 | 16 | 31 | −15 | 7 | Admitted to Class B |

=== Group 4 ===
| Pos | Team | Pld | W | D | L | GF | GA | GD | Pts | Qualification |
|---|---|---|---|---|---|---|---|---|---|---|
| 1 | Torpedo Kharkiv | 14 | 9 | 4 | 1 | 30 | 7 | +23 | 22 | Advanced to Semifinals |
| 2 | Khimik Severodonetsk | 14 | 10 | 2 | 2 | 41 | 15 | +26 | 22 | Admitted to Class B |
| 3 | Avanhard Druzhkivka | 14 | 9 | 2 | 3 | 36 | 22 | +14 | 20 | |
| 4 | Chuhuyiv city | 14 | 8 | 3 | 3 | 26 | 8 | +18 | 19 | |
| 5 | Avanhard Luhansk | 14 | 5 | 1 | 8 | 16 | 29 | −13 | 11 | |
| 6 | Shakhtar Chystyakove | 14 | 3 | 2 | 9 | 16 | 33 | −17 | 8 | |
| 7 | Shakhtar Sverdlovsk | 14 | 3 | 1 | 10 | 12 | 31 | −19 | 7 | |
| 8 | Khimik Makiivka | 14 | 1 | 1 | 12 | 6 | 38 | −32 | 3 | |

=== Group 5 ===
| Pos | Team | Pld | W | D | L | GF | GA | GD | Pts | Qualification |
|---|---|---|---|---|---|---|---|---|---|---|
| 1 | Avanhard Zhovti Vody | 14 | 11 | 2 | 1 | 44 | 11 | +33 | 24 | Advanced to Semifinals |
| 2 | Avanhard Dniprodzerzhynsk | 14 | 7 | 2 | 5 | 36 | 25 | +11 | 16 | |
| 3 | Shakhtar Oleksandriya | 14 | 7 | 2 | 5 | 27 | 22 | +5 | 16 | |
| 4 | Komintern Q/A Kryvyi Rih | 14 | 5 | 5 | 4 | 23 | 23 | 0 | 15 | |
| 5 | KremHESbud | 14 | 4 | 6 | 4 | 19 | 21 | −2 | 14 | |
| 6 | Pervomaisk | 14 | 3 | 6 | 5 | 19 | 26 | −7 | 12 | |
| 7 | Chervona Zirka Kirovohrad | 14 | 4 | 3 | 7 | 23 | 27 | −4 | 11 | |
| 8 | Avanhard Voznesensk | 14 | 1 | 2 | 11 | 14 | 50 | −36 | 4 | |

=== Group 6 ===
| Pos | Team | Pld | W | D | L | GF | GA | GD | Pts | Qualification |
|---|---|---|---|---|---|---|---|---|---|---|
| 1 | Zhovtnevyi Raion Kyiv | 14 | 11 | 2 | 1 | 44 | 11 | +33 | 24 | Advanced to Semifinals |
| 2 | Lokomotyv Poltava | 14 | 7 | 2 | 5 | 36 | 25 | +11 | 16 | |
| 3 | Shakhtar Konotop | 14 | 7 | 2 | 5 | 27 | 22 | +5 | 16 | |
| 4 | Torpedo Sumy | 14 | 5 | 5 | 4 | 23 | 23 | 0 | 15 | |
| 5 | Shakhtar Korostyshiv | 14 | 4 | 6 | 4 | 19 | 21 | −2 | 14 | |
| 6 | Avanhard Uman | 14 | 3 | 6 | 5 | 19 | 26 | −7 | 12 | |
| 7 | Shakhtar Vatutine | 14 | 4 | 3 | 7 | 23 | 27 | −4 | 11 | |
| 8 | Spartak Bila Tserkva | 14 | 1 | 2 | 11 | 14 | 50 | −36 | 4 | |

=== Group 7 ===
| Pos | Team | Pld | W | D | L | GF | GA | GD | Pts | Qualification |
|---|---|---|---|---|---|---|---|---|---|---|
| 1 | Torpedo Kyiv | 14 | 11 | 2 | 1 | 44 | 11 | +33 | 24 | Advanced to Semifinals |
| 2 | Avanhard Sumy | 14 | 7 | 2 | 5 | 36 | 25 | +11 | 16 | Admitted to Class B |
| 3 | Avanhard Kriukiv | 14 | 7 | 2 | 5 | 27 | 22 | +5 | 16 | |
| 4 | Kolhospnyk-2 Poltava | 14 | 5 | 5 | 4 | 23 | 23 | 0 | 15 | |
| 5 | Avanhard Malyn | 14 | 4 | 6 | 4 | 19 | 21 | −2 | 14 | |
| 6 | Avanhard Pryluky | 14 | 3 | 6 | 5 | 19 | 26 | −7 | 12 | |
| 7 | Avanhard Shostka | 14 | 4 | 3 | 7 | 23 | 27 | −4 | 11 | |
| 8 | Chernihiv | 14 | 1 | 2 | 11 | 14 | 50 | −36 | 4 | Admitted to Class B |

=== Group 8 ===
| Pos | Team | Pld | W | D | L | GF | GA | GD | Pts | Qualification |
|---|---|---|---|---|---|---|---|---|---|---|
| 1 | SKVO Odesa | 14 | 11 | 2 | 1 | 44 | 11 | +33 | 24 | Advanced to Semifinals |
| 2 | Chervonohvardiyets Odesa | 14 | 7 | 2 | 5 | 36 | 25 | +11 | 16 | |
| 3 | Mohylyov-Podilskyi | 14 | 7 | 2 | 5 | 27 | 22 | +5 | 16 | |
| 4 | DRVZ Kyiv | 14 | 5 | 5 | 4 | 23 | 23 | 0 | 15 | |
| 5 | Burevisnyk Kamianets-Podilskyi | 14 | 4 | 6 | 4 | 19 | 21 | −2 | 14 | |
| 6 | Avanhard Vinnytsia | 14 | 3 | 6 | 5 | 19 | 26 | −7 | 12 | |
| 7 | FC Dynamo Khmelnytskyi | 14 | 4 | 3 | 7 | 23 | 27 | −4 | 11 | Admitted to Class B |
| 8 | Vodnyk Izmail | 14 | 1 | 2 | 11 | 14 | 50 | −36 | 4 | |

=== Group 9 ===
| Pos | Team | Pld | W | D | L | GF | GA | GD | Pts | Qualification |
|---|---|---|---|---|---|---|---|---|---|---|
| 1 | GDO Lutsk | 14 | 8 | 3 | 3 | 25 | 9 | +16 | 19 | Advanced to Semifinals |
| 2 | Avanhard Berezynka | 14 | 8 | 3 | 3 | 24 | 11 | +13 | 19 | |
| 3 | Avanhard Chernivtsi | 14 | 9 | 1 | 4 | 27 | 20 | +7 | 19 | Admitted to Class B |
| 4 | Avanhard Uzhhorod | 14 | 5 | 4 | 5 | 30 | 26 | +4 | 14 | |
| 5 | Shakhtar Novovolynsk | 14 | 6 | 1 | 7 | 29 | 25 | +4 | 13 | |
| 6 | Avanhard Kolomyia | 14 | 4 | 5 | 5 | 18 | 23 | −5 | 13 | |
| 7 | Avanhard Lviv | 14 | 5 | 1 | 8 | 25 | 31 | −6 | 11 | |
| 8 | Kharchovyk Stanislav | 14 | 1 | 2 | 11 | 14 | 47 | −33 | 4 | |

=== Group 10 ===
| Pos | Team | Pld | W | D | L | GF | GA | GD | Pts | Qualification |
|---|---|---|---|---|---|---|---|---|---|---|
| 1 | Naftovyk Drohobych | 14 | 10 | 2 | 2 | 34 | 9 | +25 | 22 | Advanced to Semifinals |
| 2 | Khimik Kalush | 14 | 8 | 3 | 3 | 27 | 11 | +16 | 19 | |
| 3 | Kolhospnyk Berehovo | 14 | 6 | 3 | 5 | 27 | 21 | +6 | 15 | |
| 4 | Avanhard Vynohradiv | 14 | 7 | 1 | 6 | 22 | 27 | −5 | 15 | |
| 5 | Avanhard Rivno | 14 | 6 | 0 | 8 | 19 | 18 | +1 | 12 | |
| 6 | Volodymyr-Volynskyi | 14 | 4 | 4 | 6 | 17 | 31 | −14 | 12 | |
| 7 | Chortkiv | 14 | 4 | 3 | 7 | 16 | 25 | −9 | 11 | |
| 8 | Mashynobudivnyk Chernivtsi | 14 | 2 | 2 | 10 | 19 | 39 | −20 | 6 | |

== Semifinal groups ==
=== Group 1 ===
| Pos | Team | Pld | W | D | L | GF | GA | GD | Pts |
|---|---|---|---|---|---|---|---|---|---|
| 1 | SKVO Odesa | 4 | 2 | 1 | 1 | 5 | 3 | +2 | 5 |
| 2 | Torpedo Kharkiv | 4 | 2 | 1 | 1 | 5 | 3 | +2 | 5 |
| 3 | Budivelnyk Zaporizhia | 4 | 2 | 0 | 2 | 6 | 5 | +1 | 4 |
| 4 | GDO Lutsk | 4 | 2 | 0 | 2 | 4 | 7 | −3 | 4 |
| 5 | Torpedo Kyiv | 4 | 0 | 2 | 2 | 2 | 4 | −2 | 2 |

=== Group 2 ===
| Pos | Team | Pld | W | D | L | GF | GA | GD | Pts |
|---|---|---|---|---|---|---|---|---|---|
| 1 | Avanhard Zhovti Vody | 4 | 2 | 2 | 0 | 11 | 3 | +8 | 6 |
| 2 | Naftovyk Drohobych | 4 | 1 | 3 | 0 | 3 | 2 | +1 | 5 |
| 3 | Burevisnyk Melitopol | 4 | 1 | 2 | 1 | 6 | 5 | +1 | 4 |
| 4 | Zhovtnevyi Raion Kyiv | 4 | 2 | 0 | 2 | 3 | 4 | −1 | 4 |
| 5 | Spartak Kharkiv | 4 | 0 | 1 | 3 | 3 | 12 | −9 | 1 |

== Final ==
| Pos | Team | Pld | W | D | L | GF | GA | GD | Pts | Promotion |
|---|---|---|---|---|---|---|---|---|---|---|
| 1 | Avanhard Zhovti Vody | 3 | 2 | 1 | 0 | 9 | 3 | +6 | 5 | Promoted to Class B |
| 2 | Torpedo-KhTZ Kharkiv | 3 | 2 | 0 | 1 | 6 | 4 | +2 | 4 | Promoted to Class B |
| 3 | SKVO Odessa | 3 | 1 | 1 | 1 | 3 | 3 | 0 | 3 | Cannot be promoted |
| 4 | Naftovyk Drohobych | 3 | 0 | 0 | 3 | 2 | 10 | −8 | 0 | Promoted to Class B |

=== Champions ===
Avanhard Zhovti Vody: Yuriy Zinchenko (goalie), Anatoliy Kokhanov (goalie), Leonid Trypolskyi, Aleksandr Lunin (RUS), Anatoliy Havryuk, Leontiy Dobrov, Vladimir Tupichev (RUS), Viktor Stryzhak, Hennadiy Kyrylov, Viktor Sukovitsyn (RUS), Boris Fisher (EST), Borys Tiahai, Viktor Frolov, Yuliy Dmitriyev (RUS).

Coach: Matviy Cherkaskyi

== Promoted teams ==
- Final group (3): Avanhard Zhovti Vody, Torpedo-KhTZ Kharkiv, Naftovyk Drohobych
- Other participants (6): Dynamo Khmelnytskyi (7th in group 8), Avanhard Chernivtsi (3rd in group 9), Khimik Severodonetsk (2nd in group 4), Avanhard Sumy (2nd in group 7), Avanhard Kramatorsk (8th in group 3), Avanhard Zhdanov (2nd in group 1)
- Other teams that did not participate (2): Avanhard Chernihiv, Avanhard Lutsk

=== Other notes ===
- FC Shakhtar Rutchenkove (5th in group 2) merged with FC Avanhard Zhdanov
- SKVO Odessa was fielding in tournament its reserve squad having its master team already in Class B competitions

== Ukrainian clubs at the All-Union level ==
The Ukrainian SSR was presented with 28 teams of masters (exhibition teams) at the All-Union level:

- Group A: Dynamo Kyiv, Shakhtar Stalino
- Group B: Avanhard Mykolaiv, Metalurh Dnipropetrovsk, Metalurh Zaporizhia, Spartak Kherson, Khimik Dniprodzerzhynsk // Avanhard Kharkiv, Kolhospnyk Cherkasy, Arsenal Kyiv, Zirka Kirovohrad, Avanhard Zhytomyr, Avanhard Kryvyi Rih, Kolhospnyk Poltava // – // Lokomotyv Vinnytsia, SKVO Odesa, Chornomorets Odesa, SKVO Lviv, Spartak Uzhhorod, Kolhospnyk Rivno, SCCF Sevastopol, Avanhard Simferopol, Spartak Stanislav, Avanhard Ternopil // Trudovi Rezervy Luhansk, Lokomotyv Stalino, Shakhtar Kadiivka, Shakhtar Horlivka

== Number of teams by region ==
| Number | Region | Team(s) | |
| Number | Region | Ukrainian SSR | All-Union |
|---|---|---|---|
| 8 (3) | Donetsk Oblast | Avanhard Zhdanov, Shakhtar Rutchenkove, Avanhard Chasiv Yar, Avanhard Yenakieve, Avanhard Kramatorsk, Avanhard Druzhkivka, Shakhtar Chystiakove, Khimik Makiivka | Shakhtar Stalino, Lokomotyv Stalino, Shakhtar Horilvka |
| 6 (3) | Dnipropetrovsk Oblast | Metalurh Nikopol, Mashynobudivnyk Dnipropetrovsk, Avanhard Ordzhonikidze, Avanhard Zhovti Vody, Avanhard Dniprodzerzhynsk, r/u imeni Kominterna Kryvyi Rih | Metalurh Dnipropetrovsk, Khimik Dniprodzerzhynsk, Avanhard Kryvyi Rih |
| 6 (2) | Luhansk Oblast | Metalurh Voroshylovsk, Shakhtar Bryanka, Khimik Rubizhne, Khimik Severodonetsk, Avanhard Luhansk, Shakhtar Sverdlovsk | Trudovi Rezervy Luhansk, Shakhtar Kadiivka |
| 5 (1) | Zaporizhia Oblast | Budivelnyk Zaporizhia, Avanhard Velykyi Tokmak, Budivelnyk Melitopol, Mashynobudivnyk Zaporizhia, Avanhard Berdiansk | Metalurh Zaporizhia |
| 4 (2) | Kyiv Oblast | Zhovtnevyi Raion (Temp) Kyiv, Spartak Bila Tserkva, Torpedo Kyiv, DRVZ Kyiv | Dynamo Kyiv, Arsenal Kyiv |
| 4 (1) | Kharkiv Oblast | Spartak Kharkiv, Lokomotyv Lozova, Torpedo Kharkiv, Chuhuiv | Avanhard Kharkiv |
| 4 (1) | Zakarpattia Oblast | Avanhard Berezynka (Mukachevo), Avanhard Uzhhorod, Kolhospnyk Berehove, Avanhard Vynohradove | Spartak Uzhhorod |
| 4 (0) | Sumy Oblast | Shakhtar Konotop, Torpedo Sumy, Avanhard Sumy, Avanhard Shostka | – |
| 3 (2) | Odesa Oblast | SKVO Odesa (klubnaya), Chervonohvardiyets Odesa, Vodnyk Izmail | Chornomorets Odesa, SKVO Odesa |
| 3 (2) | Crimea | Avanhard Sevastopol, Metalurh Kerch, Avanhard Simferopol (klubnaya) | SKCF Sevastopol, Avanhard Simferopol |
| 3 (1) | Mykolaiv Oblast | Avanhard Mykolaiv (klubnaya), Pervomaisk, Avanhard Voznesensk | Avanhard Mykolaiv |
| 3 (1) | Kirovohrad Oblast | Shakhtar Oleksandriya, Kremhesbud, Chervona Zirka Kirovohrad | Zirka Kirovohrad |
| 3 (1) | Poltava Oblast | Lokomotyv Poltava, Avanhard Kryukiv, Kolhospnyk-2 Poltava | Kolhospnyk Poltava |
| 3 (1) | Ivano-Frankivsk Oblast | Avanhard Kolomyia, Kharchovyk Stanislav, Khimik Kalush | Spartak Stanislav |
| 3 (0) | Volyn Oblast | GDO Lutsk, Shakhtar Novovolynsk, Volodymyr-Volynskyi | – |
| 2 (1) | Kherson Oblast | Enerhiya Nova Kakhovka, Avanhard Kherson | Spartak Kherson |
| 2 (1) | Cherkasy Oblast | Avanhard Uman, Shakhtar Vatutine | Kolhospnyk Cherkasy |
| 2 (1) | Zhytomyr Oblast | Shakhtar Korostyshiv, Avanhard Malyn | Avanhard Zhytomyr |
| 2 (1) | Vinnytsia Oblast | Mohiliv-Podilskyi, Avanhard Vinnytsia | Lokomotyv Vinnytsia |
| 2 (0) | Chernihiv Oblast | Avanhard Pryluky, Chernihiv | – |
| 2 (0) | Khmelnytskyi Oblast | Burevisnyk Kamianets-Podilskyi, Dynamo Khmelnytskyi | – |
| 1 (1) | Lviv Oblast | Avanhard Lviv | SKVO Lviv |
| 1 (1) | Rivne Oblast | Avanhard Rivno | Kolhospnyk Rivne |
| 1 (1) | Ternopil Oblast | Chortkiv | Avanhard Ternopil |
| 1 (0) | Chernivtsi Oblast | Avanhard Chernivtsi, Mashynobudivnyk Chernivtsi | – |
| 1 (0) | (Soviet Union) Drohobych Oblast | Naftovyk Drohobych | – |

== See also ==
- 1964 KFK competitions (Ukraine)
- 1959 Football Cup of Ukrainian SSR among KFK
