= 1972 Cup of the Ukrainian SSR =

1972 Football Cup of the Ukrainian SSR
Football Cup among teams of masters

Tournament details
- Host country: Soviet Union, Ukrainian SSR
- Dates: 4 November – 19 November
- Teams: 27

Final positions
- Champions: Avtomobilist Zhytomyr (1st title)
- Runners-up: Shakhtar Donetsk

Tournament statistics
- Matches played: 28
- Goals scored: 91 (3.25 per match)

The Ukrainian Cup 1972 was a football knockout competition conducting by the Football Federation of Ukrainian SSR and was known as the Ukrainian Cup.

The Football Cup started with the preliminary round on November 4, 1972, and involved the republican level non-amateur clubs. The competition started soon after the conclusion of the 1972 Soviet Second League, Zone 1 on 31 October 1972. The Round of 16 that started on November 8, 1972 had several Soviet First League teams joining the competition, among which were Shakhtar, Chornomorets, Metalist, and others. Some of them were represented by their second (reserve) squads. Teams from the Soviet Top League did not participate.

The competition concluded in just over two weeks in Kyiv on November 19.

== Teams ==
=== Tournament distribution ===
The competition was conducted among 21 Ukrainian clubs of the 1972 Soviet Second League, Zone 1 and all 5 Ukrainian clubs of the 1972 Soviet First League and FC Khimik Zhytomyr. Three more Ukrainian clubs of the Second League Lokomotyv Donetsk, Khimik Severodonetsk and Mayak Kharkiv did not participate.

First round (22 teams)	21 entrants from the Second League (Zone 1); FC Khimik Zhytomyr	
Second round (16 teams)	5 entrants from the First League	11 winners from the first round

=== Other professional teams ===
The four Ukrainian professional teams in the Soviet Top League did not take part in the competition.

- 1972 Soviet Top League (4): FC Dnipro Dnipropetrovsk, FC Dynamo Kyiv, FC Karpaty Lviv, FC Zorya Voroshylovhrad

== Competition schedule ==
=== First elimination round ===
November 4, 1972

Team 1	Score	Team 2
Spartak Ivano-Frankivsk	2–2 (a.e.t.)	Lokomotyv Vinnytsia
Bukovyna Chernivtsi	3–1	Hoverla Uzhhorod
SC Lutsk	0–1	Tavriya Simferopol
Avanhard Sevastopol	2–1	Sudnobudivnyk Mykolaiv
Shakhtar Horlivka	5–3	Shakhtar Makiivka
Dynamo Khmelnytsky	1–3	Budivelnyk Ternopil
Zirka Kirovohrad	1–2	Metalurh Zhdanov
Frunzenets Sumy	3–1	Shakhtar Kadiivka
Budivelnyk Poltava	1–0	Khimik Zhytomyr
SC Chernihiv	4–3	Lokomotyv Kherson
Avanhard Rivne	1–3	Avtomobilist Zhytomyr

Replay (November 5)

Team 1	Score	Team 2
Spartak Ivano-Frankivsk	0–1	Lokomotyv Vinnytsia

=== Second elimination round ===
November 8, 1972

Team 1	Score	Team 2
Lokomotyv Vinnytsia	3–0	Bukovyna Chernivtsi
Tavriya Simferopol	2–0	Avanhard Sevastopol
Shakhtar Horlivka	3–4	Shakhtar Donetsk
Budivelnyk Ternopil	0–3	Kryvbas Kryvyi Rih
Frunzenets Sumy	5–0	Metalist Kharkiv
Budivelnyk Poltava	2–0	Metalurh Zaporizhia
Avtomobilist Zhytomyr	2–1 (a.e.t.)	SC Chernihiv
Metalurh Zhdanov	0–1	Chornomorets Odessa

8 November 1972

Avtomobilist Zhytomyr	2–1 (a.e.t.)	SC Chernihiv
Nesmiyan 94'; Vasyutin 104'	Report	Shakun 110'

Stadion imeni Leninskoho komsomolu, Vinnytsia
Attendance: 1,000
Referee: Kachar (Kyiv)

=== Quarterfinals ===
November 12, 1972

Team 1	Score	Team 2
Shakhtar Donetsk	5–2	Tavriya Simferopol
Kryvbas Kryvyi Rih	0–1	Lokomotyv Vinnytsia
Avtomobilist Zhytomyr	1–0	Budivelnyk Poltava
Chornomorets Odessa	1–1 (a.e.t.)	Frunzenets Sumy

Replay (November 13)

Team 1	Score	Team 2
Chornomorets Odessa	2–1	Frunzenets Sumy

12 November 1972

Avtomobilist Zhytomyr	1–0	Budivelnyk Poltava
Zelenskyi 55'	Report	Naydenov (red card)

Stadion imeni Leninskoho komsomolu, Vinnytsia
Attendance: 1,000
Referee: Muturdumov (Kyiv)

=== Semifinals ===
Team 1	Score	Team 2
Lokomotyv Vinnytsia	0–3	Shakhtar Donetsk
Chornomorets Odessa	1–2	Avtomobilist Zhytomyr

16 November 1972

Lokomotyv Vinnytsia	0–3	Shakhtar Donetsk
	[ Report]	Prokopenko 10'; Kashchey 30'; Safonov

16 November 1972

Chornomorets Odesa	1–2	Avtomobilist Zhytomyr
Tomashevskyi 75'	Report	Pinchuk 25'; Nesmiyan 40'

Stadion ChMP, Odesa
Attendance: 3,000
Referee: Shvetsov

=== Final ===
Team 1	Score	Team 2
Avtomobilist Zhytomyr	1–0 (a.e.t.)	Shakhtar Donetsk

19 November 1972

Avtomobilist Zhytomyr	1–0 (a.e.t.)	Shakhtar Donetsk
Kotov 91'	Report

Republican Stadium, Kyiv
Attendance: 5,000
Referee: Kachar (Kyiv)

Avtomobilist: Zhurba, Kozynets, Bilyi, Kravchuk, Horbach, Pestrykov, Pinchuk, Sladkovskyi (Solovyov, 55), Vasiutyn, Nesmiyan (Kotov, 73), Zelenskyi
Head coach: Lifshits
Shakhtar: Chanov, Yaremchenko, Kurhanov (Horbunov, 74), Belousov, Hubych, Kashchey, Vasin, Konkov, Prokopenko (Shevchuk, 68), Dudynskyi (Kliuchyk, 70), Safonov
Head coach: Bazylevych

== Top goalscorers ==
Scorer	Goals	Team
(Ukrainian Soviet Socialist Republic)	?	

Ukrainian Cup 1972 Winners

FC Avtomobilist Zhytomyr
First title

== See also ==
- Soviet Cup
- Ukrainian Cup
- 1972 Football Cup of Ukrainian SSR among KFK
