= 1989 Football Cup of Ukrainian SSR among KFK =

1989 Ukrainian Amateur Cup
Tournament details
- Country: Soviet Union (Ukrainian SSR)

Final positions
- Champions: FC Prohres Berdychiv
- Runners-up: FC Avanhard Lozova

The 1989 Football Cup of Ukrainian SSR among KFK was the annual season of Ukraine's football knockout competition for amateur football teams. The winner of the competition was awarded a prize from the newspaper "Radyanska Ukraina".

== Competition schedule ==
=== First qualification round ===
Team 1	Score	Team 2
FC Metalist Zdolbuniv	2–1	FC Pidshypnyk Lutsk
FC Tiasmyn Smila	0–2	FC Meliorator Kakhovka
FC Mayak Ochakiv	2–1	FC Tytan Armyansk

=== Second qualification round ===
Team 1	Score	Team 2
FC Mayak Ochakiv	1–0	FC Blyskavka Baryshivka
FC Metalist Zdolbuniv	1–0	FC Nyva Berezhany
FC Meliorator Kakhovka	x–x	TBD
FC Hranit Sharhorod	x–x	TBD
FC Prohres Berdychiv	x–x	TBD
FC Avanhard Lozova	x–x	TBD

=== Quarterfinals (1/4) ===
Team 1	Score	Team 2
FC Hranit Sharhorod	2–0	FC Metalist Zdolbuniv
FC Meliorator Kakhovka	2–0	FC Mayak Ochakiv
FC Prohres Berdychiv	x–x	TBD
FC Avanhard Lozova	x–x	TBD

=== Semifinals (1/2) ===
Team 1	Score	Team 2
FC Prohres Berdychiv	x–x	FC Hranit Sharhorod
FC Avanhard Lozova	x–x	FC Meliorator Kakhovka

=== Final ===
Team 1	Agg.	Team 2	1st leg	2nd leg
FC Avanhard Lozova	2–4	FC Prohres Berdychiv	0–0	2–4

== See also ==
- 1989 KFK competitions (Ukraine)
