= 1959 Football Cup of Ukrainian SSR among KFK =

1959 Ukrainian Amateur Cup
Tournament details
- Country: Soviet Union (Ukrainian SSR)

Final positions
- Champions: FC Shakhtar Korostyshiv
- Runners-up: FC Avanhard Zhovti Vody
- Soviet Amateur Cup: FC Shakhtar Korostyshiv

The 1959 Football Cup of Ukrainian SSR among KFK was the annual season of Ukraine's football knockout competition for amateur football teams.

== Competition schedule ==
=== First qualification round ===
Team 1	Score	Team 2
FC Avanhard Kherson	1–1	FC Spartak Kharkiv
FC Shakhtar Budyonivka	1–1	FC Mashynobudivnyk Zaporizhia
FC Avanhard Horodok	3–2	UIC 33138 Kozyatyn
SKA Odessa (reserves)	w/o	FC Boryspil
FC Chervona Zirka Kirovohrad	2–3	FC Avanhard Zhovti Vody
FC Avanhard Uzhhorod	4–2	FC Khimik Kalush
FC Avanhard Mykolaiv (reserves)	2–1	GDO Simferopol
FC Shakhtar Korostyshiv	4–1	FC Dynamo Khmelnytskyi
FC Shakhtar Konotop	w/o	Garrison FC Cherkasy
FC Avanhard Chernihiv	0–5	FC Bilshovyk Kyiv

Replays

Team 1	Score	Team 2
FC Avanhard Kherson	2–1	FC Spartak Kharkiv
FC Shakhtar Budyonivka	2–1	FC Mashynobudivnyk Zaporizhia

=== Second qualification round ===
Team 1	Score	Team 2
FC Kolhospnyk Novoselytsia	1–0	FC Avanhard Kremenets
FC Avanhard Horodok	4–1	FC Avanhard Uzhhorod
FC Avanhard Mykolaiv (reserves)	3–0	FC Avanhard Kherson
FC Shakhtar Korostyshiv	1–0	FC Bilshovyk Kyiv
GDO Lutsk	6–0	UIC 06874 Ostroh
FC Shakhtar Budyonivka	2–0	FC Shakhtar Konotop
FC Avanhard Zhovti Vody	2–0	SKA Odessa (reserves)
FC Metalurh Voroshylovsk	3–1	FC Lokomotyv Poltava

=== Quarterfinals (1/4) ===
August 19

Team 1	Score	Team 2
FC Shakhtar Korostyshiv	7–0	FC Avanhard Horodok

August 20

Team 1	Score	Team 2
FC Avanhard Zhovti Vody	4–0	FC Metalurh Voroshylovsk
FC Shakhtar Budyonivka	0–1	FC Avanhard Mykolaiv (reserves)
FC Kolhospnyk Novoselytsia	4–2	GDO Lutsk

=== Semifinals (1/2) ===
September 2

Team 1	Score	Team 2
FC Avanhard Zhovti Vody	5–0	FC Avanhard Mykolaiv (reserves)
FC Shakhtar Korostyshiv	2–1	FC Kolhospnyk Novoselytsia

=== Final ===
September 9

Team 1	Score	Team 2
FC Avanhard Zhovti Vody	1–2	FC Shakhtar Korostyshiv

== See also ==
- 1959 Football Championship of the Ukrainian SSR
