= Ihor Rakhayev =

Ukrainian footballer (born 1973)

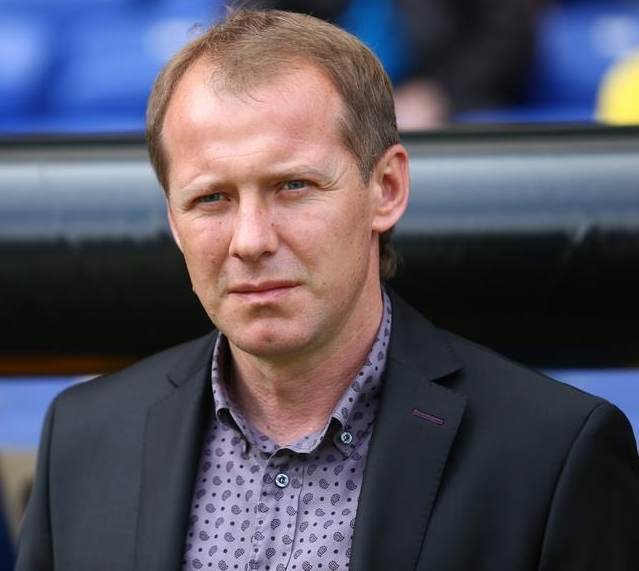
- Rakhayev in 2015

Personal information
- Full name: Ihor Volodymyrovych Rakhayev
- Date of birth: 26 May 1973 (age 53)
- Place of birth: Kharkiv, Ukrainian SSR
- Height: 1.75 m (5 ft 9 in)
- Position: Midfielder

Senior career*
Years	Team	Apps	(Gls)
1990–1992	Olympik Kharkiv	57	(3)
1992–1994	Torpedo Zaporizhzhia	17	(0)
1995	FC Avanhard Merefa	10	(0)
1995–1997	Metalist Kharkiv	31	(3)
1997	Metalist-2 Kharkiv	9	(2)
1998	Arsenal Kharkiv	8	(1)
Total		132	(9)

Managerial career
- 2002–2005: Arsenal Kharkiv
- 2005: Arsenal Kharkiv
- 2006–2011: Metalist Kharkiv (reserves)
- 2011–2014: Metalist Kharkiv (assistant)
- 2014: Metalist Kharkiv (interim)
- 2014–2015: Metalist Kharkiv
- 2016: Zaria Bălți
- 2016–2017: Aktobe
- 2017–2018: Helios Kharkiv
- 2020–2021: Bălți
- 2023–: Avanhard Lozova
- * Club domestic league appearances and goals

Ihor Rakhayev (Ukrainian: Ігор Володимирович Рахаєв; born 26 May 1973) is a Ukrainian professional football coach and a former player.

== Career ==
From June 2011, Rakhayev was an assistant coach with Metalist Kharkiv. And on 24 February 2014, after Myron Markevych's resignation he became the head coach of this club.

On 13 May 2017, he left his position as manager of FC Aktobe.

In March 2020, he was appointed head coach of Moldovan "A" Division club FC Bălți. He left the club by mutual consent in December 2021.
