= 2020 Football Championship of Kharkiv Oblast =

2020 Football Championship won in Ukraine by FC Univer-Dynamo Kharkiv

Football Championship of Kharkiv Oblast
- Season: 2020
- Champions: FC Univer-Dynamo Kharkiv

The 2020 Football Championship of Kharkiv Oblast was won by FC Univer-Dynamo Kharkiv.

== League table ==
Pos	Team	Pld	W	D	L	GF	GA	GD	Pts
1	Univer-Dynamo Kharkiv (C)	18	15	1	2	57	14	+43	46
2	Avanhard Kharkiv	18	10	2	6	36	25	+11	32
3	FC Zmiiv	18	9	4	5	42	34	+8	31
4	FC Lozova-Paniutyne	18	8	5	5	39	34	+5	29
5	Kvadro Pervomaiskyi	18	7	7	4	42	30	+12	28
6	FC Bohodukhiv	18	8	2	8	27	34	−7	26
7	Mayak Valky	18	7	3	8	28	32	−4	24
8	Enerhetyk Solonytsivka	18	5	5	8	22	39	−17	20
9	FC Pervomaiskyi	18	4	2	12	18	35	−17	14
10	Arena Kharkiv	18	1	1	16	20	54	−34	4

Source: "Таблиці чемпіонату області 2020". Kharkiv Oblast Association of Football. Archived from the original on 2020-11-18.
(C) Champions
