= 2019 Football Championship of Kharkiv Oblast =

Football Championship of Kharkiv Oblast
- Season: 2019
- Champions: FC Vovchansk

The 2019 Football Championship of Kharkiv Oblast was won by FC Vovchansk.

== League table ==
| Pos | Team | Pld | W | D | L | GF | GA | GD | Pts |
|---|---|---|---|---|---|---|---|---|---|
| 1 | Vovchansk (C) | 18 | 13 | 5 | 0 | 48 | 7 | +41 | 44 |
| 2 | Univer-Dynamo Kharkiv | 18 | 12 | 5 | 1 | 46 | 10 | +36 | 41 |
| 3 | FC Zmiiv | 18 | 10 | 2 | 6 | 38 | 37 | +1 | 32 |
| 4 | FC Lozova-Paniutyne | 18 | 6 | 9 | 3 | 34 | 25 | +9 | 27 |
| 5 | FC Pervomaiskyi | 18 | 7 | 4 | 7 | 29 | 35 | −6 | 25 |
| 6 | Enerhetyk Solonytsivka | 18 | 6 | 5 | 7 | 32 | 33 | −1 | 23 |
| 7 | Mayak Valky | 18 | 5 | 4 | 9 | 33 | 29 | +4 | 19 |
| 8 | Kvadro Pervomaiskyi | 18 | 4 | 4 | 10 | 20 | 32 | −12 | 16 |
| 9 | Arena Kharkiv | 18 | 4 | 3 | 11 | 20 | 49 | −29 | 15 |
| 10 | Solidarnist Zolochiv | 18 | 2 | 1 | 15 | 12 | 55 | −43 | 7 |

Source: "Чемпіонат Харківської області 2019". Footboom. Archived from the original on 2020-06-20.
(C) Champions
- FC Vovchansk played in the 2019–20 Ukrainian Football Amateur League.
