= 1970 Football Cup of Ukrainian SSR among KFK =

1970 Ukrainian Amateur Cup
Tournament details
- Country: Soviet Union (Ukrainian SSR)

Final positions
- Champions: Avanhard Simferopol
- Runners-up: Avanhard Kryvyi Rih

The 1970 Football Cup of Ukrainian SSR among KFK was the annual season of Ukraine's football knockout competition for amateur football teams.

== Competition schedule ==
=== Preliminary round ===
Team 1	Score	Team 2
FC Chaika Sevastopol	4–1	FC Sudnobudivnyk-2 Mykolaiv
FC Portovyk Illichivsk	2–0	FC Avanhard Cherkasy
FC Avanhard Svitlovodsk	4–1	FC Promin Poltava
FC Myasokombinat Vinnytsia	1–0	FC Sluch Krasyliv
FC Lokomotyv Kovel	4–1	FC Budivelnyk Zhytomyr
FC Kolos Rakytne	4–3	DOK Chernivtsi
FC Torpedo Nizhyn	2–1	FC Zenit Sumy

=== First qualification round ===
Team 1	Score	Team 2
FC Avanhard Simferopol	1–0	FC Krystal Kherson
FC Chaika Sevastopol	x–x	FC Hirnyk Dniprorudne
FC Shakhtar Makiivka	4–1	FC Avanhard Svitlovodsk
FC Kholodylnyk Vasylkiv	x–x	FC Portovyk Illichivsk
FC Avanhard Kryvyi Rih	1–0	FC Myasokombinat Vinnytsia
FC Lokomotyv Kovel	3–0	FC Avtomobilist Uzhhorod
FC Karpaty Kolomyia	2–1	FC Kolos Zalishchyky
FC Tsementnyk Mykolaiv	x–x	FC Kolos Rakytne
FC Torpedo Nizhyn	1–2	FC Bilshovyk Kyiv
FC Mayak Kharkiv	3–0	FC Shakhtar Hirske

=== Second qualification round ===
Team 1	Score	Team 2
FC Avanhard Simferopol	3–1	FC Chaika Sevastopol
FC Shakhtar Makiivka	2–0	FC Kholodylnyk Vasylkiv
FC Avanhard Kryvyi Rih	3–1	FC Lokomotyv Kovel
FC Karpaty Kolomyia	-/+	FC Tsementnyk Mykolaiv
FC Bilshovyk Kyiv	1–0	FC Mayak Kharkiv

Notes:

- The match Karpaty – Tsementnyk originally ended in victory of Kolomyia team, but its result was scratched, and victory was awarded to Mykolaiv.

=== Quarterfinals (1/4) ===
Team 1	Score	Team 2
FC Avanhard Kryvyi Rih	2–0	FC Tsementnyk Mykolaiv

=== Semifinals (1/2) ===
Team 1	Score	Team 2
FC Avanhard Simferopol	3–2	FC Shakhtar Makiivka
FC Avanhard Kryvyi Rih	4–2	FC Bilshovyk Kyiv

=== Final ===
Team 1	Score	Team 2
FC Avanhard Simferopol	2–0	FC Avanhard Kryvyi Rih

== See also ==
- 1970 KFK competitions (Ukraine)
