= FC Enerhiya Nova Kakhovka =

Enerhiya Nova Kakhovka
- Full name: Enerhiya Nova Kakhovka
- Founded: 1952
- Dissolved: 2022
- Ground: Enerhiya Stadium, Nova Kakhovka
- Capacity: 2,878
- League: Ukrainian Second League
- 2021–22: 13th of 16, Group B
- Website: http://fcenergiya.com.ua/
Home colours	Away colours

Enerhiya Nova Kakhovka was a Ukrainian professional football team from Nova Kakhovka in Kherson oblast. The club competed in the Ukrainian Second League since 2010.

== History ==
The club was founded in 1952 on the basis of worker's collective on the hydroelectrical station that is on the Dnipro River (Kakhovka Hydroelectric Power Plant). Between 1957-1991, the club was administered by the local Electrical Machine Works.

As club has won the regional oblast championship of Kherson 17 times and 15 times were Oblast Cup champions.

From 1967 to 1971, the club participated in the Soviet professional competitions in the Ukrainian Class B Division until they were phased away.

In their debut as professionals in the season of 2010–11 the club was amongst the leaders.

In April 2022 interview Enerhiya manager Eduard Khavrov announced the dissolution of the club since 1 April 2022 due to Russian occupation of Nova Kakhovka during 2022 Russian invasion of Ukraine.

=== Honours ===
- Ukrainian Amateur Football competitions (Soviet/Ukrainian Lower Tier)

1964, 1972
1979, 1984

- Ukrainian Amateur Cup

1979, 1982
1980, 1983

== Players ==
As of 4 August 2023 Note: Flags indicate national team as defined under FIFA eligibility rules; some limited exceptions apply. Players may hold more than one non-FIFA nationality.

No.	Pos.	Nation	Player
2	DF	UKR	Oleksandr Nesteruk
4	DF	UKR	Ivan Kiriyenko
5	DF	UKR	Dmytro Mamich
6	MF	UKR	Vadym Rossokhatyi
7	MF	UKR	Serhiy Tsoy
8	MF	UKR	Yaroslav Terekhov
10	FW	UKR	Serhiy Fedorov
12	GK	UKR	Dmytro Kachan
13	MF	UKR	Yevhen Androshchuk
14	DF	UKR	Yuriy Hezelo
15	DF	UKR	Pavlo Besarab

No.	Pos.	Nation	Player
16	FW	UKR	Mykola Khymenyuk
17	MF	UKR	Andriy Havrylenko
18	MF	UKR	Vladyslav Bondar
19	DF	UKR	Volodymyr Bizhko
20	MF	UKR	Andriy Hapisov
21	MF	UKR	Vladyslav Skala
22	MF	UKR	Denys Shved
23	MF	UKR	Vadym Shovkovyi
33	DF	UKR	Vladyslav Boroday
—	MF	UKR	Viktor Okatyi
—	FW	UKR	Vladyslav Zhavko

== League and cup history ==
=== Soviet Union ===
Season	Div.	Pos.	Pl.	W	D	L	GS	GA	P	Domestic Cup	Europe	Notes
1954	Rep	4/_{6}	10	4	1	5	14	16	9			
1955	Rep	4/_{8}	14	7	1	6	20	24	15			as Enerhiya Kakhovka
1956	Rep	7/_{8}	14	3	2	9	11	48	8			
1957	Rep	6/_{6}	10	0	1	9	4	34	1			
1958												
1959	Rep	6/_{8}	14	4	5	5	19	29	13			
1960–1963	regional competitions											
1964	4th	1/_{4}	6	4	1	1	8	3	9			
1964	4th	1/_{6}	5	4	0	1	8	3	8			
1965	4th	3/_{5}	8	2	3	3	9	10	7			
1966	4th	2/_{5}	8	6	1	1	16	4	13			Admitted
1967	3rd	18/_{21}	40	9	14	17	24	41	32			
1968	3rd	15/_{22}	42	12	14	16	32	39	38			
1969	3rd	16/_{21}	40	9	16	15	27	33	34			
1970	3rd (lower)	18/_{27}	40	16	9	15	43	43	41			tier disbanded
1971	4th	2/_{6}	10	6	3	1	23	5	15			
1972	4th	1/_{8}	14	9	3	2	27	10	21			
1972	4th	1/_{6}	5	3	1	1	9	3	7			
1973	4th	4/_{8}	14	6	3	5	24	20	15			
1974	4th	7/_{8}	14	2	3	9	14	26	7			

=== Ukraine ===
Season	Div.	Pos.	Pl.	W	D	L	GS	GA	P	Domestic Cup	Europe	Notes
2010	4th	3/_{5}	8	3	2	3	10	9	11			Admitted
2010–11	3rd "A"	3/_{12}	22	13	5	4	38	17	44	1/32 finals		
2011–12	3rd "A"	4/_{14}	26	15	7	4	50	17	52	1/32 finals		
2012–13	3rd "B"	10/_{13}	24	5	6	13	25	50	21	1/32 finals		
2012–13	3rd "3"	1/_{4}	6	6	0	0	14	3	18	1/32 finals		Stage 2
2013–14	3rd	16/_{19}	36	9	4	23	38	85	31	1/32 finals		
2014–15	3rd "B"	10/_{10}	27	4	3	20	25	69	15	1/32 finals		
2015–16	3rd "B"	9/_{14}	26	10	3	13	31	38	33	1/32 finals		
2016–17	3rd "B"	8/_{17}	32	14	6	12	62	46	48	1/32 finals		
2017–18	3rd "B"	3/_{12}	33	19	4	10	67	32	61	1/32 finals		
2018–19	3rd "B"	6/_{10}	27	8	7	12	26	31	31	1/64 finals		
2019–20	3rd "B"	5/_{11}	20	6	7	7	25	26	25	1/64 finals		
2020–21	3rd "B"	5/_{12}	22	9	3	10	34	35	30	1/64 finals		
2021–22	3rd "B"	13/_{16}	20	5	2	13	20	40	17	1/64 finals		Withdrew
