= 1955 Football Championship of the Ukrainian SSR =

Football Championship of UkrSSR
- Season: 1955
- Champions: Spartak Stanislav
- Runner up: Spartak Kherson

The 1955 Football Championship of UkrSSR were part of the 1955 Soviet republican football competitions in the Soviet Ukraine.

== Qualification group stage ==
=== Group 1 ===
Pos	Team	Pld	W	D	L	GF	GA	GD	Pts
1	Mashynobudivnyk Kyiv	14	13	0	1	41	6	+35	26
2	Shakhtar Odesa	14	9	3	2	25	16	+9	21
3	Kolhospnyk Poltava	14	8	2	4	25	13	+12	18
4	Dynamo Zhytomyr	14	4	4	6	21	27	−6	12
5	Burevisnyk Vinnytsia	14	2	6	6	14	21	−7	10
6	Chernihiv	14	3	3	8	10	30	−20	9
7	Urozhai Rivne	14	2	4	8	14	21	−7	8
8	Dynamo Khmelnytskyi	14	2	4	8	15	31	−16	8

=== Group 2 ===
Pos	Team	Pld	W	D	L	GF	GA	GD	Pts
1	Torpedo Kirovohrad	14	10	3	1	30	13	+17	23
2	Budivelnyk Mykolaiv	14	9	2	3	35	15	+20	20
3	Lokomotyv Kyiv	14	6	5	3	31	19	+12	17
4	Lokomotyv Poltava	14	7	3	4	28	22	+6	17
5	Torpedo Kharkiv	14	7	1	6	31	23	+8	15
6	Dnipropetrovsk	14	2	6	6	18	33	−15	10
7	Spartak Bila Tserkva	14	0	5	9	15	44	−29	5
8	Burevisnyk Cherkasy	14	0	5	9	12	43	−31	5

=== Group 3 ===
Pos	Team	Pld	W	D	L	GF	GA	GD	Pts
1	Lokomotyv Artemivsk	14	9	3	2	31	13	+18	21
2	Metalurh Nikopol	14	8	3	3	27	16	+11	19
3	Shakhtar Staline	14	6	4	4	26	17	+9	16
4	Shakhtar Kadiivka	14	5	5	4	17	14	+3	15
5	Enerhiya Kharkiv	14	6	1	7	20	19	+1	13
6	Avanhard Voroshylovhrad	14	3	5	6	18	33	−15	11
7	Torpedo Kyiv	14	3	3	8	11	20	−9	9
8	Torpedo Sumy	14	2	4	8	12	29	−17	8

=== Group 4 ===
Pos	Team	Pld	W	D	L	GF	GA	GD	Pts
1	Spartak Kherson	14	8	3	3	42	20	+22	19
2	Metalurh Zhdanov	14	7	4	3	31	23	+8	18
3	ODO Odesa	14	6	4	4	32	17	+15	16
4	Avanhard Mykolaiv	14	7	2	5	28	29	−1	16
5	Zaporizhia	14	6	3	5	30	19	+11	15
6	Metalurh Kryvyi Rih	14	4	4	6	27	42	−15	12
7	Avanhard Sevastopol	14	3	3	8	16	38	−22	9
8	Metalurh Kerch	14	3	1	10	17	35	−18	7

=== Group 5 ===
Pos	Team	Pld	W	D	L	GF	GA	GD	Pts
1	Khimik Dniprodzerzhynsk	14	12	1	1	37	11	+26	25
2	Khimik Zaporizhia	14	11	1	2	37	11	+26	23
3	Enerhiya Osypenko	14	7	3	4	29	25	+4	17
4	Enerhiya Kakhovka (Note: Possibly FC Enerhiya Nova Kakhovka rather than Enerhiya Kakhovka; Enerhiya Nova Kakhovka participated in 1954 and 1956, Enerhiya Kakhovka recorded only for this 1955 season.)	14	7	1	6	20	24	−4	15
5	Burevisnyk Simferopol	14	3	4	7	12	24	−12	10
6	Metalurh Horlivka	14	3	3	8	12	21	−9	9
7	Shakhtar Yenakieve	14	2	4	8	16	27	−11	8
8	Metalurh Voroshylovsk	14	1	3	10	15	35	−20	5

Source: ukr-footbal.org.ua

=== Group 6 ===
Pos	Team	Pld	W	D	L	GF	GA	GD	Pts
1	Burevisnyk Mukacheve	14	8	4	2	31	13	+18	20
2	Spartak Stanislav	14	7	6	1	26	11	+15	20
3	Dynamo Chernivtsi	14	5	6	3	34	23	+11	16
4	Dynamo Ternopil	14	5	4	5	27	18	+9	14
5	Dynamo Lutsk	14	4	6	4	27	28	−1	14
6	Naftovyk Drohobych	14	5	3	6	26	29	−3	13
7	Kolhospnyk Berehove	14	2	4	8	21	44	−23	8
8	Torpedo Lviv	14	2	3	9	13	39	−26	7

== Final ==
Pos	Team	Pld	W	D	L	GF	GA	GD	Pts	Qualification
1	FC Spartak Stanislav	7	6	1	0	19	6	+13	13	Play-off
2	FC Spartak Kherson	7	5	1	1	23	9	+14	11	
3	FC Torpedo Kirovohrad	7	3	2	2	11	8	+3	8	
4	FC Burevisnyk Mukacheve	7	2	4	1	16	20	−4	8	
5	FC Khimik Dniprodzerzhynsk	7	2	2	3	11	15	−4	6	
6	FC Mashynobudivnyk Kyiv	7	0	4	3	10	14	−4	4	
7	FC Lokomotyv Artemivsk	7	1	2	4	11	20	−9	4	
8	FC Kolhospnyk Poltava	7	0	2	5	15	24	−9	2	

== Promotion play-off ==
- DOF Sevastopol – FC Spartak Stanislav 2:0 0:2 0:2

== Ukrainian clubs at the All-Union level ==
- Class A (2): Dynamo Kyiv, Shakhtar Stalino
- Class B (8): Lokomotyv Kharkiv, Metalurh Zaporizhia, Metalurh Dnipropetrovsk, Spartak Uzhhorod, ODO Lviv, DOF Sevastopol, ODO Kyiv, Kharchovyk Odesa

== Number of teams by region ==
Number	Region	Team(s)	
Number	Region	Ukrainian SSR	All-Union
5 (1)	Donetsk Oblast	Lokomotyv Artemivsk, Shakhtar Stalino (klubnaya), Metalurh Zhdanov, Metalurh Horlivka, Shakhtar Yenakieve	Shakhtar Stalino
4 (2)	Kyiv Oblast	Mashynobudivnyk Kyiv, Lokomotyv Kyiv, Spartak Bila Tserkva, Torpedo Kyiv	Dynamo Kyiv, ODO Kyiv
4 (1)	Dnipropetrovsk Oblast	Dnipropetrovsk, Metalurh Nikopol, Metalurh Kryvyi Rih, Khimik Dniprodzerzhynsk	Metalurh Dnipropetrovsk
3 (1)	Crimea	Avanhard Sevastopol, Metalurh Kerch, Burevisnyk Simferopol	DOF Sevastopol
3 (1)	Zaporizhia Oblast	Zaporizhia, Khimik Zaporizhia, Enerhiya Osypenko	Metalurh Zaporizhia
3 (0)	Luhansk Oblast	Shakhtar Kadiivka, Avanhard Voroshylovhrad, Metalurh Voroshylovsk	–
2 (1)	Zakarpattia Oblast	Burevisnyk Mukachevo, Kolhospnyk Berehove	Spartak Uzhhorod
2 (1)	Odesa Oblast	Shakhtar Odesa, ODO Odesa	Kharchovyk Odesa
2 (1)	Kharkiv Oblast	Torpedo Kharkiv, Enerhiya Kharkiv	Lokomotyv Kharkiv
2 (0)	Mykolaiv Oblast	Budivelnyk Mykolaiv, Avanhard Mykolaiv	–
2 (0)	Kherson Oblast	Spartak Kherson, Enerhiya Nova Kakhovka	–
2 (0)	Poltava Oblast	Kolhospnyk Poltava, Lokomotyv Poltava	–
1 (1)	Lviv Oblast	Torpedo Lviv, Trud Lviv	ODO Lviv
1 (0)	Sumy Oblast	Torpedo Sumy	–
1 (0)	Chernihiv Oblast	Chernihiv	–
1 (0)	Kirovohrad Oblast	Torpedo Kirovohrad	–
1 (0)	(Soviet Union) Drohobych Oblast	Naftovyk Drohobych	–
1 (0)	Vinnytsia Oblast	Burevisnyk Vinnytsia	–
1 (0)	Ivano-Frankivsk Oblast	Spartak Stanislav	–
1 (0)	Zhytomyr Oblast	Dynamo Zhytomyr	–
1 (0)	Chernivtsi Oblast	Dynamo Chernivtsi	–
1 (0)	Rivne Oblast	Urozhai Rivne	–
1 (0)	Volyn Oblast	Dynamo Lutsk	–
1 (0)	Khmelnytskyi Oblast	Dynamo Khmelnytskyi	–
1 (0)	Ternopil Oblast	Dynamo Ternopil	–
1 (0)	Cherkasy Oblast	Burevisnyk Cherkasy	–

== Relegation play-offs ==
- Lokomotyv Poltava - Avanhard Kremenchuk 4:4 3:3 1:4
