= FC Promin Poltava =

Defunct football club based in Poltava, Ukraine

Promin Poltava
- Founded: 1964
- Dissolved: 1979
- Ground: Poltava

Football Club Promin Poltava (Ukrainian: ФК Промінь Полтава, Russian: ФК Луч Полтава); was a Ukrainian Soviet football team based in Poltava, Ukraine.

== History ==
Football club was formed in Poltava in 1964 at the Gas discharge lamps factory in Poltava. Oleh Leshchenko was the first captain and one the creators of the team. In 1968 Borys Maslov became the captain. Anatolii Shtryhol was the manager from 1966 to 1972. Vasyl Salkov replaced him.

The club played in Second Group for two years before being admitted to First Group in 1966 after two teams withdrew. They finished fourth. Club also won the Poltava City championship in 1965 and 1966. In 1967 championship Promin finished third earning their first bronze medals. They won the bronze again in 1968. In the cup Promin reached the final. The match ended in a 1–1 draw. In a replay a day later Promin won 1–0. In 1969 the club won city championship. In the championship they finished second. In 1970 Promin again finished second. On 28 June the club won its second cup. They also won Poltava city championship and cup. They lost in the first qualifying match of the 1970 Football Cup of Ukrainian SSR among KFK. Promin won its first championship in 1971. They lost in the cup final against Lokomotyv Poltava. During 1972 the club took part in 1972 KFK competition finishing sixth in their group. Promin also won the city cup. Next year the club won city cup, city championship and Oblast cup. In 1973 KFK competition they finished last in their group. In 1973 Football Cup of Ukrainian SSR among KFK they reached second qualifying round. In 1974 they won the cup and in 1974 KFK competition they finished third and reached the quarterfinals of 1974 Football Cup of Ukrainian SSR among KFK. In April 1975 club won silver medals in a six team tournament "Snowdrop". They lost in cup final to Suputnyk. Promin won that years city cup. In 1975 KFK competition they finished in fourth place in Zone 5. During 1976 city cup final, Promin lost to Suputnyk. In 1976 KFK competition they finished sixth. Next year they again finished sixth in 1977 KFK competition. They won the oblast cup and the city cup. Next season they returned to Poltava Oblast championship where they finished fifth and reached semifinal of the city cup. During 1979 season the club began playing in the first stage of the championship but did not finish. Soon the club was dissolved.

== Honours ==
Poltava Oblast Championship

Winners (1): 1971
Runners-up (2): 1969, 1970
Third place (2): 1967, 1968

Poltava Oblast Cup

Winners (5): 1968, 1970, 1973, 1974, 1977
Runners-up (2): 1971, 1975

Poltava Championship

Winners (5): 1965, 1966, 1969, 1970, 1973

Poltava Cup

Winners (5): 1970, 1972, 1973, 1975, 1977
Runners-up (1): 1976

== Sources ==
- Lomov, Anatolii; Stadnychenko, Oleksandr (2009), 100 Років Полтавському Футболу [100 Years of Poltava Football] (in Ukrainian), Poltava: Poltava, ISBN 978-966-97035-0-7
- Lomov, Anatolii; Kryvorotko, Serhii (2010), Энциклопеди Полтавского Футбола (1909-2010) [Encyclopedia of Poltava Football (1909-2010)] (in Russian), Poltava: OOO "ASMI", ISBN 978-966-182-118-6
