= 1971 KFK competitions (Ukraine) =

1971 sporting event

KFK competitions
- Season: 1971
- Champions: Shakhtar Makiivka

The 1971 KFK competitions in Ukraine were part of the 1971 Soviet KFK competitions that were conducted in the Soviet Union. It was the 8th season of the KFK in Ukraine since its introduction in 1964.

== First stage ==
=== Group 1 ===
Pos	Team	Pld	W	D	L	GF	GA	GD	Pts
1	Sokil Lviv	10	7	2	1	21	8	+13	16
2	LVVPU Lviv	10	6	3	1	12	4	+8	15
3	Kooperator Berehovo	10	4	3	3	11	10	+1	11
4	Latorytsia Mukachevo	10	3	2	5	13	15	−2	8
5	Budivelnyk Kalush	10	2	2	6	9	18	−9	6
6	Lehmash Chernivtsi	10	1	2	7	12	23	−11	4

Source: ukr-football.org.ua

=== Group 2 ===
Pos	Team	Pld	W	D	L	GF	GA	GD	Pts
1	Karpaty Mukachevo	10	8	2	0	18	2	+16	18
2	Sluch Krasyliv	10	5	2	3	11	6	+5	12
3	Elektrovymiriuvach Zhytomyr	10	4	2	4	10	13	−3	10
4	Torpedo Lutsk (amateur)	10	4	1	5	14	18	−4	9
5	Tsementnyk Mykolaiv	10	3	1	6	11	10	+1	7
6	Torpedo Rivne	10	1	2	7	1	16	−15	4

Source: ukr-football.org.ua

=== Group 3 ===
Pos	Team	Pld	W	D	L	GF	GA	GD	Pts
1	Khimik Chernihiv	10	7	3	0	19	6	+13	17
2	Kolos Buchach	0	-	-	-	-	-	—	0
3	Kharchovyk Vinnytsia	0	-	-	-	-	-	—	0
4	Avanhard Stryi	0	-	-	-	-	-	—	0
5	Avtomobilist Kyiv	0	-	-	-	-	-	—	0
6	Irpin	0	-	-	-	-	-	—	0

Source: ukr-football.org.ua

=== Group 4 ===
Pos	Team	Pld	W	D	L	GF	GA	GD	Pts
1	Avanhard Orzhonikidze	10	5	3	2	14	6	+8	13
2	Tytan Zaporizhia	10	5	3	2	11	7	+4	13
3	Avanhard Kryvyi Rih	10	1	8	1	8	7	+1	10
4	Shakhtar Oleksandriya	10	2	6	2	8	10	−2	10
5	Avanhard Svitlovodsk	10	2	5	3	10	14	−4	9
6	Lokomotyv Smila	10	1	3	6	5	12	−7	5

Source: ukr-football.org.ua

=== Group 5 ===
Pos	Team	Pld	W	D	L	GF	GA	GD	Pts
1	Mayak Kharkiv	10	6	3	1	16	2	+14	15
2	Vikhr Dnipropetrovsk	10	6	2	2	17	8	+9	14
3	Frunzenets Sumy	10	3	4	3	8	11	−3	10
4	Vahonobudivnyk Kremenchuk	10	3	2	5	16	20	−4	8
5	Avanhard Vilnohirsk	10	1	5	4	9	15	−6	7
6	Torpedo Berlinsk	10	1	4	5	5	15	−10	6

Source: ukr-football.org.ua

=== Group 6 ===
Pos	Team	Pld	W	D	L	GF	GA	GD	Pts
1	Avanhard Simferopil	10	7	3	0	28	1	+27	17
2	Enerhiya Nova Kakhovka	10	6	3	1	23	5	+18	15
3	Portovyk Odesa	10	4	4	2	17	11	+6	12
4	Metalist Sevastopol	0	-	-	-	-	-	—	0
5	Volha Mykolaiv	0	-	-	-	-	-	—	0
6	Tekstylnyk Kherson	10	0	2	8	6	16	−10	2

Source: ukr-football.org.ua

=== Group 7 ===
Pos	Team	Pld	W	D	L	GF	GA	GD	Pts
1	Shakhtar Makiivka	10	10	0	0	34	4	+30	20
2	Vuhlyk Donetsk	10	4	2	4	9	9	0	10
3	Shakhtar Krasnodon	10	4	2	4	13	17	−4	10
4	Khimik Horlivka	10	4	1	5	12	15	−3	9
5	Avanhard Volodarsk	10	1	4	5	3	18	−15	6
6	Shakhtar Brianka	10	0	5	5	6	14	−8	5

Source: ukr-football.org.ua

=== Group 8 ===
Pos	Team	Pld	W	D	L	GF	GA	GD	Pts
1	Shakhtar Lysychansk	0	-	-	-	-	-	—	0
2	Tsvetmet Artemivsk	0	-	-	-	-	-	—	0
3	Avanhard Antratsyt	0	-	-	-	-	-	—	0
4	Shakhtar Sverdlovsk	0	-	-	-	-	-	—	0
5	Avtosklo Kostiantynivka	0	-	-	-	-	-	—	0
6	Shakhtar Snizhne	0	-	-	-	-	-	—	0

Source: ukr-football.org.ua

== Semifinal ==
=== Group 1 ===
Pos	Team	Pld	W	D	L	GF	GA	GD	Pts
1	Karpaty Mukachevo	3	2	1	0	4	1	+3	5
2	Sokil Lviv	3	1	2	0	4	2	+2	4
3	Avanhard Ordzhinikidze	3	0	2	1	0	2	−2	2
4	Khimik Chernihiv	3	0	1	2	1	4	−3	1

Source: ukr-football.org.ua

=== Group 2 ===
Pos	Team	Pld	W	D	L	GF	GA	GD	Pts
1	Shakhtar Makiivka	3	2	1	0	11	4	+7	5
2	Mayak Kharkiv	3	1	2	0	7	6	+1	4
3	Shakhtar Lysychansk	3	1	0	2	7	9	−2	2
4	Avanhard Simferopil	3	0	1	2	4	10	−6	1

Source: ukr-football.org.ua

== Final ==
Pos	Team	Pld	W	D	L	GF	GA	GD	Pts
1	Shakhtar Makiivka	3	3	0	0	8	1	+7	6
2	Karpaty Mukacheve	3	1	1	1	3	3	0	3
3	Mayak Kharkiv	3	1	0	2	3	4	−1	2
4	Sokil Lviv	3	0	1	2	4	10	−6	1

Source: ukr-football.org.ua

== Promotion ==
None of KFK teams were promoted to the 1972 Soviet Second League, Zone 1.

- FC Shakhtar Makiivka
- FC Mayak Kharkiv

However, to the Class B were promoted following teams that did not participate in the KFK competitions:

- none
