= 1954 Football Championship of the Ukrainian SSR =

Football Championship of UkrSSR
- Season: 1954
- Champions: Zenit Kyiv

The 1954 Football Championship of UkrSSR were part of the 1954 Soviet republican football competitions in the Soviet Ukraine.

== Qualification group stage ==
=== Group 1 ===
Pos	Team	Pld	W	D	L	GF	GA	GD	Pts
1	Zenit Kyiv	10	7	2	1	45	9	+36	16
2	Shakhtar Odesa	10	8	0	2	33	7	+26	16
3	Chernihiv	10	4	4	2	12	7	+5	12
4	Zhytomyr	10	3	3	4	14	23	−9	9
5	Spartak Bila Tserkva	10	1	2	7	12	41	−29	4
6	Torpedo Cherkasy	10	1	1	8	6	35	−29	3

=== Group 2 ===
Pos	Team	Pld	W	D	L	GF	GA	GD	Pts
1	Lokomotyv Poltava	10	8	0	2	17	12	+5	16
2	Lokomotyv Artemivsk	10	6	1	3	26	11	+15	13
3	Khimik Dniprodzerzhynsk	10	4	4	2	19	13	+6	12
4	Spartak Kyiv	10	3	2	5	14	20	−6	8
5	Enerhiya Kharkiv	10	3	0	7	11	24	−13	6
6	Torpedo Sumy	10	2	1	7	9	16	−7	5

=== Group 3 ===
Pos	Team	Pld	W	D	L	GF	GA	GD	Pts
1	ODO Odesa	10	8	1	1	22	8	+14	17
2	Spartak Kherson	10	5	2	3	27	11	+16	12
3	Torpedo Kirovohrad	10	4	4	2	21	14	+7	12
4	Avanhard Mykolaiv	10	3	2	5	19	17	+2	8
5	Mashynobudivnyk Dnipropetrovsk	10	3	2	5	14	22	−8	8
6	Avanhard Sevastopol	10	1	1	8	12	43	−31	3

=== Group 4 ===
Pos	Team	Pld	W	D	L	GF	GA	GD	Pts
1	Metalurh Zhdanov	10	7	1	2	19	6	+13	15
2	Shakhtar Kadiivka	10	7	0	3	18	8	+10	14
3	Torpedo Kharkiv	10	6	1	3	15	11	+4	13
4	Shakhtar Staline	10	4	1	5	14	18	−4	9
5	Mashynobudivnyk Zaporizhia	10	3	2	5	14	19	−5	8
6	Trud Simferopol	10	0	1	9	5	23	−18	1

=== Group 5 ===
Pos	Team	Pld	W	D	L	GF	GA	GD	Pts
1	Spartak Stanislav	10	6	3	1	16	8	+8	15
2	Kolhospnyk Berehove	10	4	5	1	17	12	+5	13
3	Iskra Mukacheve	10	3	6	1	17	13	+4	12
4	Naftovyk Drohobych	10	2	4	4	11	17	−6	8
5	Trud Lviv	10	2	2	6	13	18	−5	6
6	Dynamo Chernivtsi	10	2	2	6	9	15	−6	6

=== Group 6 ===
Pos	Team	Pld	W	D	L	GF	GA	GD	Pts
1	Dynamo Ternopil	10	8	1	1	22	5	+17	17
2	Lokomotyv Kyiv	10	7	1	2	19	8	+11	15
3	Dynamo Khmelnytskyi	10	5	1	4	19	13	+6	11
4	Trud Vinnytsia	10	2	3	5	14	17	−3	7
5	Dynamo Rivne	10	2	2	6	7	20	−13	6
6	Dynamo Lutsk	10	0	4	6	6	24	−18	4

=== Group 7 ===
Pos	Team	Pld	W	D	L	GF	GA	GD	Pts
1	Budivelnyk Mykolaiv	10	8	1	1	30	9	+21	17
2	Metalurh Horlivka	10	6	1	3	20	16	+4	13
3	Metalurh Nikopol	10	5	1	4	23	14	+9	11
4	Enerhiya Nova Kakhovka	10	4	1	5	14	16	−2	9
5	Avanhard Voroshylovhrad	10	3	1	6	13	21	−8	7
6	Metalurh Kerch	10	1	1	8	12	36	−24	3

== Final ==
Pos	Team	Pld	W	D	L	GF	GA	GD	Pts	Qualification
1	FC Zenit Kyiv	6	5	0	1	10	2	+8	10	Play-off
2	FC Spartak Stanislav	6	3	2	1	12	3	+9	8	
3	FC Budivelnyk Mykolaiv	6	3	1	2	5	4	+1	7	
4	ODO Odessa	6	3	1	2	4	4	0	7	
5	FC Lokomotyv Poltava	6	3	0	3	9	8	+1	6	
6	FC Metalurh Zhdanov	6	1	1	4	3	14	−11	3	
7	FC Dynamo Ternopil	6	0	1	5	1	9	−8	1	

== Promotion play-off ==
- ODO Kiev – FC Zenit Kyiv 2:0 3:2

== Ukrainian clubs at the All-Union level ==
- Class A (2): Dynamo Kyiv, Lokomotyv Kharkiv
- Class B (8): Shakhtar Stalino, Metalurh Odesa, Metalurh Zaporizhia, Metalurh Dnipropetrovsk, Spartak Uzhhorod, ODO Lviv, DOF Sevastopol, ODO Kyiv

== Number of teams by region ==
Number	Region	Team(s)	
Number	Region	Ukrainian SSR	All-Union
4 (2)	Kyiv Oblast	Zenit Kyiv, Spartak Bila Tserkva, Spartak Kyiv, Lokomotyv Kyiv	Dynamo Kyiv, ODO Kyiv
4 (1)	Donetsk Oblast	Lokomotyv Artemivsk, Metalurh Zhdanov, Shakhtar Stalino (klubnaya), Metalurh Horlivka	Shakhtar Stalino
3 (1)	Dnipropetrovsk Oblast	Khimik Dniprodzerzhynsk, Mashynobudivnyk Dnipropetrovsk, Metalurh Nikopol	Metalurh Dnipropetrovsk
3 (1)	Crimea	Avanhard Sevastopol, Trud Simferopol, Metalurh Kerch	DOF Sevastopol
2 (1)	Zakarpattia Oblast	Kolhospnyk Berehove, Iskra Mukachevo	Spartak Uzhhorod
2 (1)	Odesa Oblast	Shakhtar Odesa, ODO Odesa	Metalurh Odesa
2 (1)	Kharkiv Oblast	Enerhiya Kharkiv, Torpedo Kharkiv	Lokomotyv Kharkiv
2 (0)	Luhansk Oblast	Shakhtar Kadiivka, Avanhard Voroshylovhrad	–
2 (0)	Mykolaiv Oblast	Avanhard Mykolaiv, Budivelnyk Mykolaiv	–
2 (0)	Kherson Oblast	Spartak Kherson, Enerhiya Nova Kakhovka	–
1 (1)	Zaporizhia Oblast	Mashynobudivnyk Zaporizhia	Metalurh Zaporizhia
1 (1)	Lviv Oblast	Trud Lviv	ODO Lviv
1 (0)	Sumy Oblast	Torpedo Sumy	–
1 (0)	Chernihiv Oblast	Chernihiv	–
1 (0)	Kirovohrad Oblast	Torpedo Kirovohrad	–
1 (0)	(Soviet Union) Drohobych Oblast	Naftovyk Drohobych	–
1 (0)	Poltava Oblast	Lokomotyv Poltava	–
1 (0)	Vinnytsia Oblast	Trud Vinnytsia	–
1 (0)	Ivano-Frankivsk Oblast	Spartak Stanislav	–
1 (0)	Zhytomyr Oblast	Zhytomyr	–
1 (0)	Chernivtsi Oblast	Dynamo Chernivtsi	–
1 (0)	Rivne Oblast	Dynamo Rivne	–
1 (0)	Volyn Oblast	Dynamo Lutsk	–
1 (0)	Khmelnytskyi Oblast	Dynamo Khmelnytskyi	–
1 (0)	Ternopil Oblast	Dynamo Ternopil	–
1 (0)	Cherkasy Oblast	Torpedo Cherkasy	–
