= 1972 KFK competitions (Ukraine) =

KFK competitions
- Season: 1972
- Champions: Enerhiya Nova Kakhovka

The 1972 KFK competitions in Ukraine were part of the 1972 Soviet KFK competitions that were conducted in the Soviet Union. It was 9th season of the KFK in Ukraine since its introduction in 1964.

== First stage ==
=== Group 1 ===
| Pos | Team | Pld | W | D | L | GF | GA | GD | Pts |
|---|---|---|---|---|---|---|---|---|---|
| 1 | Sokil Lviv | 14 | 12 | 1 | 1 | 23 | 7 | +16 | 25 |
| 2 | Kolos Buchach | 14 | 12 | 0 | 2 | 28 | 8 | +20 | 24 |
| 3 | LVVPU Lviv | 14 | 7 | 1 | 6 | 29 | 17 | +12 | 15 |
| 4 | Latorytsia Mukachevo | 14 | 4 | 3 | 7 | 11 | 12 | −1 | 11 |
| 5 | Prylad Ivano-Frankivsk | 14 | 4 | 3 | 7 | 16 | 18 | −2 | 11 |
| 6 | Kooperator Berehovo | 14 | 5 | 1 | 8 | 15 | 19 | −4 | 11 |
| 7 | DOK Chernivtsi | 14 | 4 | 0 | 10 | 14 | 36 | −22 | 8 |
| 8 | Torpedo Rivne | 14 | 3 | 1 | 10 | 9 | 28 | −19 | 7 |

Source: ukr-football.org.ua

=== Group 2 ===
| Pos | Team | Pld | W | D | L | GF | GA | GD | Pts |
|---|---|---|---|---|---|---|---|---|---|
| 1 | Avanhard Stryi | 14 | 10 | 2 | 2 | 27 | 6 | +21 | 22 |
| 2 | Karpaty Mukachevo | 14 | 7 | 5 | 2 | 26 | 9 | +17 | 19 |
| 3 | Sluch Krasyliv | 14 | 7 | 5 | 2 | 26 | 12 | +14 | 19 |
| 4 | Elektroprylad Kamianets-Podilskyi | 14 | 7 | 2 | 5 | 21 | 16 | +5 | 16 |
| 5 | Dolotnyk Drohobych | 14 | 5 | 2 | 7 | 20 | 27 | −7 | 12 |
| 6 | Budivelnyk Kalush | 14 | 5 | 1 | 8 | 22 | 23 | −1 | 11 |
| 7 | Shakhtar Novovolynsk | 14 | 4 | 3 | 7 | 17 | 33 | −16 | 11 |
| 8 | Lokomotyv Kovel | 14 | 0 | 2 | 12 | 5 | 38 | −33 | 2 |

Source: ukr-football.org.ua

=== Group 3 ===
| Pos | Team | Pld | W | D | L | GF | GA | GD | Pts |
|---|---|---|---|---|---|---|---|---|---|
| 1 | Khimik Chernihiv | 14 | 8 | 4 | 2 | 25 | 12 | +13 | 20 |
| 2 | Irpin | 14 | 5 | 7 | 2 | 16 | 12 | +4 | 17 |
| 3 | Lokomotyv Paniutyne | 14 | 5 | 5 | 4 | 9 | 15 | −6 | 15 |
| 4 | Lokomotyv Smila | 14 | 5 | 4 | 5 | 23 | 21 | +2 | 14 |
| 5 | Elektrovymiriuvach Zhytomyr | 14 | 5 | 3 | 6 | 18 | 14 | +4 | 13 |
| 6 | Promin Poltava | 14 | 2 | 8 | 4 | 14 | 16 | −2 | 12 |
| 7 | Arsenal Kyiv | 14 | 3 | 5 | 6 | 10 | 14 | −4 | 11 |
| 8 | Frunzenets Sumy | 14 | 4 | 2 | 8 | 12 | 23 | −11 | 10 |

Source: ukr-football.org.ua

=== Group 4 ===
| Pos | Team | Pld | W | D | L | GF | GA | GD | Pts |
|---|---|---|---|---|---|---|---|---|---|
| 1 | Enerhiya Nova Kakhovka | 14 | 9 | 3 | 2 | 27 | 10 | +17 | 21 |
| 2 | Chornomorets Sevastopol | 14 | 6 | 5 | 3 | 15 | 14 | +1 | 17 |
| 3 | Shakhtar Oleksandriya | 14 | 5 | 6 | 3 | 16 | 13 | +3 | 16 |
| 4 | Spartak Pervomaisk | 14 | 5 | 5 | 4 | 17 | 12 | +5 | 15 |
| 5 | Avanhard Svitlovodsk | 14 | 5 | 4 | 5 | 16 | 20 | −4 | 14 |
| 6 | Fotoprylad Cherkasy | 14 | 4 | 3 | 7 | 9 | 15 | −6 | 11 |
| 7 | Avanhard Simferopil | 14 | 4 | 3 | 7 | 20 | 27 | −7 | 11 |
| 8 | Portovyk Odesa | 14 | 2 | 3 | 9 | 9 | 18 | −9 | 7 |

Source: ukr-football.org.ua

=== Group 5 ===
| Pos | Team | Pld | W | D | L | GF | GA | GD | Pts |
|---|---|---|---|---|---|---|---|---|---|
| 1 | Shakhtar Sverdlovsk | 14 | 11 | 2 | 1 | 31 | 15 | +16 | 24 |
| 2 | Avanhard Antratsyt | 14 | 11 | 1 | 2 | 30 | 11 | +19 | 23 |
| 3 | Kolos Nikopol | 14 | 9 | 1 | 4 | 30 | 15 | +15 | 19 |
| 4 | Tsvetmet Artemivsk | 14 | 5 | 4 | 5 | 11 | 10 | +1 | 14 |
| 5 | Avanhard Vilnohirsk | 14 | 4 | 2 | 8 | 18 | 28 | −10 | 10 |
| 6 | Hirnyk Dniprorudnyi | 14 | 3 | 3 | 8 | 20 | 27 | −7 | 9 |
| 7 | Avtosklo Kostiantynivka | 14 | 2 | 3 | 9 | 15 | 31 | −16 | 7 |
| 8 | Shakhtar Torez | 14 | 3 | 0 | 11 | 15 | 33 | −18 | 6 |

Source: ukr-football.org.ua

=== Group 6 ===
| Pos | Team | Pld | W | D | L | GF | GA | GD | Pts |
|---|---|---|---|---|---|---|---|---|---|
| 1 | Shakhtar Lysychansk | 14 | 10 | 3 | 1 | 33 | 12 | +21 | 23 |
| 2 | Avanhard Kryvyi Rih | 14 | 9 | 4 | 1 | 21 | 5 | +16 | 22 |
| 3 | Avanhard Ordzhonikidze | 14 | 7 | 4 | 3 | 17 | 11 | +6 | 18 |
| 4 | Strila Zaporizhia | 14 | 5 | 4 | 5 | 14 | 14 | 0 | 14 |
| 5 | Komunarets Komunarsk | 14 | 4 | 5 | 5 | 12 | 21 | −9 | 13 |
| 6 | Khimik Horlivka | 14 | 4 | 3 | 7 | 10 | 14 | −4 | 11 |
| 7 | Shakhtar Shakhtarsk | 14 | 3 | 2 | 9 | 17 | 25 | −8 | 8 |
| 8 | Shakhtar Brianka | 14 | 1 | 1 | 12 | 9 | 31 | −22 | 3 |

Source: ukr-football.org.ua

== Final ==
| Pos | Team | Pld | W | D | L | GF | GA | GD | Pts |
|---|---|---|---|---|---|---|---|---|---|
| 1 | Enerhiya Nova Kakhovka | 5 | 3 | 1 | 1 | 9 | 3 | +6 | 7 |
| 2 | Avanhard Stryi | 5 | 3 | 1 | 1 | 8 | 3 | +5 | 7 |
| 3 | Sokil Lviv | 5 | 2 | 3 | 0 | 4 | 1 | +3 | 7 |
| 4 | Shakhtar Sverdlovsk | 5 | 1 | 2 | 2 | 2 | 6 | −4 | 4 |
| 5 | Khimik Chernihiv | 5 | 1 | 1 | 3 | 3 | 7 | −4 | 3 |
| 5 | Shakhtar Lysychansk | 5 | 1 | 0 | 4 | 4 | 10 | −6 | 2 |

Source: ukr-football.org.ua

== Promotion ==
None of KFK teams were promoted to the 1973 Soviet Second League, Zone 1.

- none

However, to the Class B were promoted following teams that did not participate in the KFK competitions:

- none
