= FC Shakhtar Krasnyi Luch =

Shakhtar
- Full name: FC Shakhtar Krasnyi Luch
- Founded: 1948; 77 years ago
- Ground: Shakhtar Stadium
- League: LNR League

FC Shakhtar Krasnyi Luch (Ukrainian: «Шахтар» (Красний Луч)) was a professional Ukrainian and Soviet football club. It currently competes at amateur level playing in occupied area. The club is based in Krasnyi Luch (Khrustalny), Ukraine.

== Brief history ==
The earliest mentioning of football team from Krasnyi Luch could be traced to 1923 which was found in Luhansk city archive.

The club was founded in 1936 as Stakhanovets and kept the name until 1946 when it changed to Shakhtar.

In June 2015, it was announced that in LNR started separated competitions with Shakhtar Krasnyi Luch listed among those that participated.

=== Stadium ===
The Shakhtar Stadium was officially opened on the October Revolution Day November 7, 1933.
