= 1974 KFK competitions (Ukraine) =

KFK competitions
- Season: 1974
- Champions: Lokomotyv Zhdanov

The 1974 KFK competitions in Ukraine were part of the 1974 Soviet KFK competitions that were conducted in the Soviet Union. It was 10th season of the KFK in Ukraine since its introduction in 1964.

== First stage ==
=== Group 1 ===
Pos	Team	Pld	W	D	L	GF	GA	GD	Pts
1	Sokil Lviv	10	8	1	1	28	4	+24	17
2	DOK Vylok	10	6	1	3	12	9	+3	13
3	Elektron Ivano-Frankivsk	10	4	4	2	13	8	+5	12
4	Avtomobilist Konychentsi	10	2	3	5	14	14	0	7
5	Voskhod Chernivtsi	10	2	2	6	8	23	−15	6
6	Tsementnyk Mykolaiv	10	2	1	7	10	27	−17	5

Source: ukr-football.org.ua

=== Group 2 ===
Pos	Team	Pld	W	D	L	GF	GA	GD	Pts
1	SKA Lviv	12	7	3	2	18	9	+9	17
2	Refryzherator Fastiv	12	6	4	2	16	10	+6	16
3	Torpedo Rivne	12	5	2	5	13	17	−4	12
4	Sluch Krasyliv	12	4	3	5	18	17	+1	11
5	Elektrovymiriuvach Zhytomyr	12	4	3	5	16	18	−2	11
6	Silmash Kovel	12	4	2	6	18	23	−5	10
7	Avanhard Vinnytsia	12	2	3	7	11	16	−5	7

Source: ukr-football.org.ua

=== Group 3 ===
Pos	Team	Pld	W	D	L	GF	GA	GD	Pts
1	Bilshovyk Kyiv	14	9	4	1	27	7	+20	22
2	Shakhtar Oleksandriya	14	10	1	3	23	13	+10	21
3	Avanhard Vilnohirsk	14	7	2	5	26	13	+13	16
4	Torpedo Mykolaiv	14	5	5	4	28	17	+11	15
5	Okean Mykolaiv	14	5	2	7	18	24	−6	12
6	Arsenal Kyiv	14	5	1	8	15	25	−10	11
7	Lokomotyv Znamianka	14	3	2	9	10	29	−19	8
8	Spartak Kirovohrad	14	3	1	10	15	34	−19	7

Source: ukr-football.org.ua

=== Group 4 ===
Pos	Team	Pld	W	D	L	GF	GA	GD	Pts
1	Kolos Nikopol	14	11	1	2	34	9	+25	23
2	Portovyk Illichivsk	14	9	3	2	28	13	+15	21
3	Khvylia Mykolaiv	14	8	2	4	25	15	+10	18
4	Krystal Kherson	14	4	6	4	19	28	−9	14
5	Hvardiets Odesa	14	3	7	4	30	24	+6	13
6	Atlantyka Sevastopol	14	2	5	7	12	28	−16	9
7	Enerhiya Nova Kakhovka	14	2	3	9	14	26	−12	7
8	Tytan Armyansk	14	2	3	9	13	32	−19	7

Source: ukr-football.org.ua

=== Group 5 ===
Pos	Team	Pld	W	D	L	GF	GA	GD	Pts
1	Bliuminh Kramatorsk	14	8	5	1	28	12	+16	21
2	Khimik Chernihiv	14	7	6	1	23	10	+13	20
3	Promin Poltava	14	6	3	5	20	16	+4	15
4	Frunzenets Sumy	14	5	4	5	18	20	−2	14
5	Svema Shostka	14	5	4	5	19	22	−3	14
6	Vohnetryvnyk Chasiv Yar	14	5	3	6	14	15	−1	13
7	Avanhard Pryluky	14	2	4	8	18	29	−11	8
8	Shakhtar Horlivka	14	1	5	8	11	27	−16	7

Source: ukr-football.org.ua

=== Group 6 ===
Pos	Team	Pld	W	D	L	GF	GA	GD	Pts
1	Lokomotyv Zhdanov	12	7	2	3	29	17	+12	16
2	Monolit Donetsk	12	6	3	3	18	10	+8	15
3	Lokomotyv Liubotych	12	6	2	4	21	11	+10	14
4	Tsvetmet Artemivsk	12	6	2	4	13	15	−2	14
5	Metalurh Kupiansk	12	5	3	4	12	12	0	13
6	Strila Zaporizhia	12	3	6	3	13	14	−1	12
7	Impuls Severodonetsk	7	0	0	7	0	27	−27	0

Source: ukr-football.org.ua

== Final ==
Pos	Team	Pld	W	D	L	GF	GA	GD	Pts	Promotion
1	Lokomotyv Zhdanov	5	3	2	0	5	2	+3	8	Promoted to Second League
2	Kolos Nikopol	5	3	1	1	9	2	+7	7	
3	Sokil Lviv	5	1	4	0	5	3	+2	6	
4	SKA Lviv	5	1	3	1	6	6	0	5	
5	Bilshovyk Kyiv	5	1	1	3	4	7	−3	3	
6	Blyuminh Kramatorsk	5	0	1	4	3	12	−9	1	

Source: ukr-football.org.ua
