= 1973 KFK competitions (Ukraine) =

KFK competitions
- Season: 1973
- Champions: Hranyt Cherkasy

The 1973 KFK competitions in Ukraine were part of the 1973 Soviet KFK competitions that were conducted in the Soviet Union. It was 10th season of the KFK in Ukraine since its introduction in 1964.

== First stage ==
=== Group 1 ===
Pos	Team	Pld	W	D	L	GF	GA	GD	Pts
1	Sokil Lviv	14	9	5	0	18	8	+10	23
2	Shakhtar Ilnytsia	14	6	5	3	11	10	+1	17
3	SKA Lviv	14	6	5	3	9	11	−2	17
4	Silmash Kovel	14	5	6	3	14	14	0	16
5	Prylad Ivano-Frankivsk	14	4	5	5	19	10	+9	13
6	Kolos Buchach	14	5	2	7	12	5	+7	12
7	Kooperator Berehovo	14	3	4	7	13	19	−6	10
8	Avtomobilist Kitsman	14	1	2	11	6	25	−19	4

Source: ukr-football.org.ua

=== Group 2 ===
Pos	Team	Pld	W	D	L	GF	GA	GD	Pts
1	Avanhard Stryi	14	9	4	1	22	8	+14	22
2	Sluch Krasyliv	14	6	7	1	17	11	+6	19
3	Tsementnyk Mykolaiv	14	7	3	4	9	10	−1	17
4	Lokomotyv Korosten	14	5	3	6	11	16	−5	13
5	Kharchovyk Vinnytsia	14	5	1	8	16	14	+2	11
6	Latorytsia Mukachevo	14	3	5	6	11	11	0	11
7	Torpedo Rivne	14	3	5	6	10	17	−7	11
8	Torpedo Drohobych	14	2	4	8	10	19	−9	8

Source: ukr-football.org.ua

=== Group 3 ===
Pos	Team	Pld	W	D	L	GF	GA	GD	Pts
1	Khimik Chernihiv	12	8	4	0	22	7	+15	20
2	Spartak Pervomaisk	12	7	4	1	13	5	+8	18
3	Avanhard Svitlovodsk	12	3	6	3	12	11	+1	12
4	Arsenal Kyiv	12	4	3	5	19	14	+5	11
5	Frunzenets Sumy	12	3	4	5	9	12	−3	10
6	Bilshovyk Kyiv	12	3	2	7	14	22	−8	8
7	Promin Poltava	12	1	3	8	8	26	−18	5

Source: ukr-football.org.ua

=== Group 4 ===
Pos	Team	Pld	W	D	L	GF	GA	GD	Pts
1	Hranyt Cherkasy	14	11	2	1	27	7	+20	24
2	Shakhtar Oleksandriya	14	9	3	2	21	14	+7	21
3	Portovyk Illichivsk	14	6	5	3	28	16	+12	17
4	Enerhiya Nova Kakhovka	14	6	3	5	24	20	+4	15
5	Khvylia Mykolaiv	14	6	1	7	19	20	−1	13
6	Chornomorets Sevastopol	14	3	2	9	13	28	−15	8
7	Spartak Kherson	14	2	3	9	12	19	−7	7
8	Avanhard Simferopil	14	2	3	9	14	34	−20	7

Source: ukr-football.org.ua

=== Group 5 ===
Pos	Team	Pld	W	D	L	GF	GA	GD	Pts
1	Hirnyk Dniprorudnyi	10	9	1	0	25	10	+15	19
2	Avanhard Antratsyt	10	6	0	4	16	9	+7	12
3	Khimik Horlivka	10	4	2	4	7	9	−2	10
4	Avanhard Kryvyi Rih	10	3	3	4	15	10	+5	9
5	Vuhlyk Chervonoarmiysk	10	3	2	5	9	14	−5	8
6	Avtosklo Kostiantynivka	10	0	2	8	6	26	−20	2

Source: ukr-football.org.ua

=== Group 6 ===
Pos	Team	Pld	W	D	L	GF	GA	GD	Pts
1	Shakhtar Sverdlovsk	12	7	3	2	22	11	+11	17
2	Tsvetmet Artemivsk	12	6	3	3	12	11	+1	15
3	Iskra Zaporizhia	12	4	5	3	12	9	+3	13
4	Metalurh Kupiansk	12	5	3	4	13	13	0	13
5	Kirovets Makiivka	11	5	1	5	11	15	−4	11
6	Mashynobudivnyk Zmiev	12	2	3	7	14	17	−3	7
7	Lokomotyv Znamianka	12	3	1	8	11	19	−8	7

Source: ukr-football.org.ua

== Final ==
Pos	Team	Pld	W	D	L	GF	GA	GD	Pts	Promotion
1	Hranyt Cherkasy	4	3	1	0	8	3	+5	7	Promoted to Second League
2	Sokil Lviv	4	1	2	1	4	2	+2	4	
3	Hirnyk Dniprorudny	4	2	0	2	3	5	−2	4	
4	Avanhard Stryi	4	2	0	2	3	5	−2	4	
5	Khimik Chernihiv	4	0	1	3	2	5	−3	1	

Source: ukr-football.org.ua

Notes
FC Shakhtar Sverdlovsk withdrew before the final stage.

== Promotion ==
None of KFK teams were promoted to the 1974 Soviet Second League, Zone 6.

- FC Hranyt Cherkasy

However, to the Class B were promoted following teams that did not participate in the KFK competitions:

- none
