= FC Metalurh Kupiansk =

Ukrainian amateur football club

FC Metalurh Kupiansk is an amateur club from Kupiansk competing at the regional competitions of Kharkiv Oblast.

The club was founded in 1971 by the Kupiansk Foundry. The club is one of the most dedicated clubs that competed at national (republican) amateur competitions (Ukrainian football championship among amateurs) being one of the three that spent there over 20 seasons and yielding only to FC Shakhtar Sverdlovsk.

== Honours ==
Ukrainian football championship among amateurs

- Runners-up (3): 1975, 1977, 1986

Football championship of Kharkiv Oblast

- Winners (12): 1973, 1975–1981, 1986, 1987, 1989, 1991
- Runners-up (1): 1972

Kharkiv Oblast Football Cup

- Holders (2): 1984, 1988
