= List of football clubs in Ukraine =

This is a list of football (soccer) clubs in Ukraine. Below is a list of football clubs in Ukraine.

The list contains all clubs:

Ukraininan competitions (since 1992)

- Ukrainian Championship participants in the Premier League, First, Second and former Third league;
- Ukrainian Cup participants;
- Ukrainian Amateur Championships medalists;
- Ukrainian Amateur Cup finalists;

Soviet competitions (before 1992)

- USSR Championship participants in the Top, First, and former Group D;
- USSR Cup participants.
- Football Championship of the Ukrainian SSR participants in the Soviet Second league and Soviet Second lower league;
- Football Cup of the Ukrainian SSR finalists;
- Ukrainian Amateur Championships (Soviet period) medalists;
- Ukrainian Amateur Cup (Soviet period) finalists;

It also contains the best clubs that participated in the Championship of Poland, Czechoslovakia, Hungary, Romania, the Russian Empire and the Soviet Union championship cities in the years 1918-1935, which are now cities on the territory of Ukraine.

The second and third club team was not added to the list.

== By league ==
Ukrainian period

- Premier Liha (Level 1)
- Persha Liha (Level 2)
- Druha Liha (Level 3)
- Amatorska Liha (Level 4)

Soviet period

- Vysshaya Liga (Level 1, all-Union)
- Pervaya Liga (Level 2, all-Union)
- Vtoraya Liga (Level 3, republican)

== Alphabetically ==
Notes: Status

- P - professional club
- A - amateur club
- D - defunct club

Name	Status	Level	City	Region	Founded	Dissolved	Former name(s)
Adoms Kremenchuk	D		Kremenchuk	Poltava	1998	2001	
Advis-Khutrovyk Khmelnytskyi	D		Khmelnytskyi	Khmelnytskyi	1990s	1990s	
Ahrobiznes Volochysk	P	2	Volochysk	Khmelnytskyi	2015		
Ahrotekhservis Sumy	D		Sumy	Sumy	1965	1996	Avtomobilist, SBTS, FC Sumy
Antratsyt Kirovske	A		Kirovske	Donetsk	1950s		Hirnyk (Hirny)
Arsenal-Kyivshchyna	A	4	Bila Tserkva	Kyiv	2006		
Arsenal Kharkiv	D		Kharkiv	Kharkiv	1998	2009	
Arsenal Kyiv	P	1	Kyiv	Kyiv	2001	2013	Nyva-Borysfen, FC Boryspil, CSKA-Borysfen, CSKA Kyiv
Artaniya Ochakiv	D		Ochakiv	Mykolaiv	1950s	1995	
Askon Yakymivka	A		Yakymivka	Zaporizhzhia	1950s		Kolos, Dorozhnyk, Rotor
Avanhard Antratsyt	A		Antratsyt	Luhansk	1950s		DP Antratsyt
Avanhard Dnipropetrovsk	D		Dnipropetrovsk	Dnipropetrovsk	1950s		
Avanhard Kramatorsk	P	2	Kramatorsk	Donetsk	1912		KSO, KGMMZ, SKMZ, Zavod im. Ordzhonikidze, Donbaskraft, VPS, Avanhard-TETs, Avanhard-SKMZ, FC Kramatorsk
Shakhtar Shakhtarsk	A		Shakhtarsk	Donetsk	1984		Prometey, Medita, Shakhtar, Fortuna
Avanhard Stalino	D		Donetsk	Donetsk	1930s		
Avanhard Zhydachiv	A		Zhydachiv	Lviv	1950s		Papirnyk, FC Zhydachiv
Avtomobilist Lviv	D		Lviv	Lviv	1950s		
Avtomobilist Odesa	D		Odesa	Odesa	1950s		
Avtomotor Kharkiv	D		Kharkiv	Kharkiv	1930s		
Azot Nyzhnya Horlivka	D		Horlivka	Donetsk	1930s		
Bakhmach	A		Bakhmach	Chernihiv	1950s		Ahroservis, Avers
FC Bakhmut	A		Bakhmut	Donetsk	1940s		Lokomotyv, Zorya, Kolormet
BASK Czernowitz	D		Chernivtsi	Chernivtsi	1910	1928	
Bastion Chornomorsk	A		Chornomorsk	Odesa	2005		Illichivets
BChA Korosten	D		Korosten	Zhytomyr	1930s	1941	
Berdiansk	A		Berdiansk	Zaporizhzhia	1930s		Kryla Rad, Torpedo, Druzhba Osypenko, Druzhba
Beregvidék Berehove	A		Berehove	Zakarpattia	1930		
Berkut Bedevlya	A		Bedevlya	Zakarpattia	1950s		
Beskyd Nadvirna	A		Nadvirna	Ivano-Frankivsk	1927		Naftovyk, Bystrytsya
Bilshovyk Kyiv	D		Kyiv	Kyiv	1930s		
Blaho Blahoyeve	D		Blahoyeve	Odesa	1980s		
Borysfen Boryspil	D		Boryspil	Kyiv	1993	2007	
Bryz Izmail	D		Izmail	Odesa	1946		Spartak, Vodnyk, Dunayets, Dunay, Dorozhnyk
Bucha	A		Bucha	Kyiv	1999		
Budivelnyk Brovary	D		Brovary	Kyiv	1990s	1996	
Budivelnyk Kamianske	D		Kamianske	Dnipropetrovsk	1933		Dzerzhynbud
Budivelnyk Kryvyi Rih	D		Kryvyi Rih	Dnipropetrovsk	1930s		
Avanhard Ternopil	D		Ternopil	Ternopil	1959	1974	Budivelnyk
Bukovyna Chernivtsi	P	3	Chernivtsi	Chernivtsi	1952		Burevisnyk, Avanhard
Burevisnyk Kryvyi Rih	D		Kryvyi Rih	Dnipropetrovsk	1930s		
Burevisnyk Stalino	D		Donetsk	Donetsk	1930s		
Chayka-VMS Sevastopol	D		Sevastopol	Crimea	1923	2002	Chayka (Balaklava), Chayka, Avanhard, Khvylya, Atlantyka, Chornomorets
Cherniakhiv	A		Cherniakhiv	Zhytomyr	1980s		KKhP-Krok, KKhP, Systema-KKhP
Chornohora Ivano-Frankivsk	A		Ivano-Frankivsk	Ivano-Frankivsk	2001		Chornohora-Nika
Chornomorets Odesa	P	2	Odesa	Odesa	1936		Kharchovyk, Spartak, Metalurh
Chortkiv	A		Chortkiv	Ternopil	1946		Dynamo, Krystal
CSKA Kyiv	D		Kyiv	Kyiv	1934	2009	UVO, UBChA, BO, OBO, OSK, SKVO, SKA, SC Chernihiv, ZS-Oriyana, CSK ZSU, FC CSKA-2 Kyiv
Czarni Lwów	D		Lviv	Lviv	1903	1939	
Dalis Komyshuvakha	D		Komyshuvakha	Zaporizhzhia	1990s		
Danubia Czernowitz	D		Chernivtsi	Chernivtsi	1909	1910	
Desna Chernihiv	P	1	Chernihiv	Chernihiv	1960		Avanhard
Dnipro Cherkasy	D		Cherkasy	Cherkasy	1955	2009	
FC Dnipro	A	4	Dnipro	Dnipropetrovsk	1918		BRIT, Zavod im. Petrovskoho, Petrovets, Stal, Metalurh
Dnipro-75 Dnipropetrovsk	D		Dnipropetrovsk	Dnipropetrovsk	2007	2010	
Dnister Zalischyky	A		Zalischyky	Ternopil	1950s		
Domobudivnyk Chernihiv	D		Chernihiv	Chernihiv	1990s		
Dovbush Chernivtsi	D		Chernivtsi	Chernivtsi	1920	1940	
Dragoș Vodă Cernăuți	D		Chernivtsi	Chernivtsi	1909	1944	RFC Cernăuţi
Dynamo Chernihiv	D		Chernihiv	Chernihiv	1930s		
Dynamo Chernivtsi	D		Chernivtsi	Chernivtsi	1940		
Dynamo Dnipropetrovsk	D		Dnipropetrovsk	Dnipropetrovsk	1929	1947	
Dynamo Kharkiv	D		Kharkiv	Kharkiv	1928	1940	
Dynamo Khmelnytskyi	D		Khmelnytskyi	Khmelnytskyi	2009		
Dynamo Kryvyi Rih	D		Kryvyi Rih	Dnipropetrovsk	1930s		
Dynamo Kyiv	P	1	Kyiv	Kyiv	1927		
Dynamo Luhansk	D		Luhansk	Luhansk	1930	1995	
Dynamo Lutsk	D		Lutsk	Lutsk	1940	1956	
Dynamo Lviv	D		Lviv	Lviv	1940		
Dynamo Mohyliv-Podilskyi	D		Mohyliv-Podilskyi	Vinnytsia	1930s		
Dynamo Mukachevo	D		Mukachevo	Zakarpattia	1945	1956	
Dynamo Mykolaiv	D		Mykolaiv	Mykolaiv	1930s		
Dynamo Odesa	D		Odesa	Odesa	1923		Sparta, Dynamo, Dynamo-Dagma, Dynamo-Flesh, Dynamo-Zmina (Yuzhne), Zmina (Yuzhne), Dynamo-SKA
Dynamo Poltava	D		Poltava	Poltava	1930s		
Dynamo Rivne	D		Rivne	Rivne	1940	1956	
Dynamo Saky	D		Saky	Crimea	1950s		Khimik, Frunzenets (Frunze), Frunzenets, FC Saki, Lider, Lider-Sport
Dynamo Slovyansk	D		Sloviansk	Donetsk	1937		Lokomotyv
Dynamo Stanislav	D		Ivano-Frankivsk	Ivano-Frankivsk	1940	1950s	
Dynamo Sumy	D		Sumy	Sumy	1930s		
Dynamo Ternopil	D		Ternopil	Ternopil	1940		
Dynamo Vinnytsia	D		Vinnytsia	Vinnytsia	1930s		
Dynamo Zhytomyr	D		Zhytomyr	Zhytomyr	1928	1956	
Ekran Shostka	D		Shostka	Sumy	1930s		Azot, Avanhard
Elektrometalurh-NZF Nikopol	A		Nikopol	Dnipropetrovsk	1950		Trubovyk, Kolos, Metalurh, Elektrometalurh
Elektron Ivano-Frankivsk	D		Ivano-Frankivsk	Ivano-Frankivsk	1950s		Prylad
Elektron Romny	D		Romny	Sumy	1950s		
Enerhetyk Burshtyn	A		Burshtyn	Ivano-Frankivsk	1948		Burshtyn, Kolhospnyk, DRES, Enerhomontazhnyk, Enerhiya, Avanhard, Henerator, Domobudivnyk
Enerhiya Nova Kakhovka	P	3	Nova Kakhovka	Kherson	1952		
Enerhiya Pivdennoukrainsk	A		Pivdennoukrainsk	Mykolaiv	1994		Olimpiya FC AES, Teplovyk
ENKO Lutsk	D		Lutsk	Lutsk	1950s		
Fakel Varva	D		Varva	Chernihiv	1992	2009	Naftovyk, Fakel, HPZ, Fakel-HPZ, Druzhba-Nova Varva
Feniks Kharkiv	D		Kharkiv	Kharkiv	1911		
Feniks-Illichovets Kalinine	D		Kalinine	Crimea	2000	2011	Feniks
Frunzenets-Liha-99 Sumy	D		Sumy	Sumy	1960	2002	Avanhard, Spartak, Frunzenets
Hakoah Cernăuți	D		Chernivtsi	Chernivtsi	1920	1932	
Hakoah Stanisławów	D		Ivano-Frankivsk	Ivano-Frankivsk	1920s	1939	
Hallerczyk Równe	D		Rivne	Rivne	1910s	1939	
Halychyna Drohobych	A	6	Drohobych	Lviv	1946		SKA Lviv, SKA-Karpaty Lviv
Halychyna Lviv	A		Lviv	Lviv	2001		Karpaty-3, Halychyna-Karpaty
Haray Zhovkva	A		Zhovkva	Lviv	1992		
Hasmonea Lwów	D		Lviv	Lviv	1908	1939	
Hasmonea Łuck	D		Lutsk	Lutsk	1920s	1939	
Hasmonea Równe	D		Rivne	Rivne	1923	1939	
Hazovyk-KhGV Kharkiv	D		Kharkiv	Kharkiv	2001	2008	
Hazovyk-Khurtovyna Komarno	A		Komarno	Lviv	1925		Khurtovyna, Hazovyk
Helferich-Sade Kharkiv	D		Kharkiv	Kharkiv	1910	1919	Sade-Futbol-Klub
Helios Kharkiv	D		Kharkiv	Kharkiv	2002	2018	
Hirnyk Dniprorudne	D		Dniprorudne	Zaporizhzhia	1960s		
Hirnyk Kryvyi Rih	P	3	Kryvyi Rih	Dnipropetrovsk	1925		Ruda
Hirnyk Pavlohrad	A		Pavlohrad	Dnipropetrovsk	1950s		
Hirnyk Rovenky	A		Rovenky	Luhansk	1924		Avanhard, Sokil, Avanhard-Industriya, Avanhard-Inter, Hirnyk-DYuSSz
Hirnyk-Illichivets Komsomolske	A		Komsomolske	Donetsk	1950s		Metalurh
Hirnyk-Sport Horishni Plavni	P	2	Horishni Plavni	Poltava	1989		Lokomotyv, Hirnyk
Hoverla Uzhhorod	D		Uzhhorod	Zakarpattia	1925		Rus, Spartak, Verkhovyna, Zakarpattia
Hran Buzova	A		Buzova	Kyiv	1990s		
Hvardiyets Hvardiyske	A		Hvardiiske	Crimea	1960s		
IFC Czernowitz	D		Chernivtsi	Chernivtsi	1909	1910	
Ihroservice Simferopol	D		Simferopol	Crimea	1936	2009	Dynamo
Mariupol	P	1	Mariupol	Donetsk	1936		Zavod im. Illicha, Stal, Metalurh, Avanhard, Azovstal, Azovets, Lokomotyv, Novator
Impuls Kamyanets-Podilskyi	D		Kamianets-Podilskyi	Khmelnytskyi	1963	1990s	Pryładobudivnyk
Irpin Horenychi	A		Horenychi	Kyiv	2008		
Ivan Odesa	D		Odesa	Odesa	1998		
Jahn Czernowitz	D		Chernivtsi	Chernivtsi	1903	1940	TSV, DFC
Janina Złoczów	D		Zolochiv	Lviv	1910s	1939	
Jehuda Tarnopol	D		Ternopil	Ternopil	1910	1939	
Junak Drohobycz	A		Drohobych	Lviv	1931		
Kafa-Goleador Feodosiya	A		Feodosiya	Crimea	1950s		Avanhard, More, Kafa, Arsenal-Kafa
Kakhovka	A	4	Kakhovka	Kherson	1950s		Avanhard, Meliorator, FC Kakhovka, Chumak, KZEZO
Kalush	P	3	Kalush	Ivano-Frankivsk	1940s		Khimik, Lukor, Prykarpattia, Spartak-2
Kanatnyi Zavod Kharkiv	D		Kharkiv	Kharkiv	1930s		
KAPO Pervomayske	D		Bolharka	Odesa	1950s		Pervomayets, Prestyzh-Pervomayets (Pivdenne)
Karlivka	A		Karlivka	Poltava	1950s		Tsukrovyky
Karpaty Dubove	D		Dubove	Zakarpattia	1950s		
Karpaty Kamianka-Buzka	A		Kamianka-Buzka	Lviv	1988		
Karpaty Kolomyia	A		Kolomyia	Ivano-Frankivsk	2006		Karpaty Pechenizhyn
Karpaty Lviv	P	1	Lviv	Lviv	1963		SKA-Karpaty
Karpaty Rakhiv	A		Rakhiv	Zakarpattia	1950s		
Karpaty Yaremche	A		Yaremche	Ivano-Frankivsk	1976		Kurorttorh, Spartak
Keramik Baranivka	A		Baranivka	Zhytomyr	1950s		BFZ
Kharchovyk Kerch	D		Kerch	Crimea	1930s		855,11
Kharchovyk Kherson	D		Kherson	Kherson	1930s		
Kharchovyk Odesa	D		Odesa	Odesa	1920s		Kinap
Kharchovyk Simferopol	D		Simferopol	Crimea	1930s		163,72
Kharkiv	D		Kharkiv	Kharkiv	2005	2010	
Khartsyzk	A		Khartsyzk	Donetsk	1950s		Hirnyk, Kanatnyk, Silur, Prometei, Silur-Trubnyk, Silur-Dynamo
Khimik Chernihiv	D		Chernihiv	Chernihiv	1950s		
Khimik Krasnoperekopsk	A		Krasnoperekopsk	Crimea	1951		
Khimik Sieverodonetsk	A		Sieverodonetsk	Luhansk	1934		
Khimmash Korosten	A		Korosten	Zhytomyr	2001		
Khodak Cherkasy	A		Cherkasy	Cherkasy	2004		
Khutrovyk Tysmenytsia	A		Tysmenytsia	Ivano-Frankivsk	1958		FC Tysmenytsia
KLS Kyiv	D		Kyiv	Kyiv	1907	1910s	
Knyazha Shchaslyve	D		Shchaslyve	Kyiv	2005		
Koksokhimichnyi Zavod Makiyivka	D		Makiivka	Donetsk	1930s		
Kolhosp im. Chapayeva	D		Chapayevka	Cherkasy	1936		
Kolormet Zaporizhzhia	D		Zaporizhzhia	Zaporizhzhia	1930s		
FC Kolos Kovalivka	P	2	Kovalivka	Kyiv	2012		
Kolos Buchach	A		Buchach	Ternopil	1950s		Druzhba
Kolos Osokorivka	A		Osokorivka	Kherson	1950s		
Komunalnyk Luhansk	D		Luhansk	Luhansk	2007	2008	
Komunarets Komunarsk	D		Alchevsk	Luhansk	1945	1988	Metalurh (Voroshylovsk), Metalurh
Konti Kostyantynivka	A		Kostiantynivka	Donetsk	1930s		Zavod im. Frunze, Stal, Sital, Monolit, Kyiv-Konti
Korona Sambor	D		Sambir	Lviv	1910s	1939	
Korosten	A		Korosten	Zhytomyr	2001		Lokomotyv
Kosmos Pavlohrad	A		Pavlohrad	Dnipropetrovsk	1950s	1995	Kolos, Shakhtar
Kovel-Volyn Kovel	A	5	Kovel	Volyn	1950s		Silmash, Silmash-Lyon, FC Kovel, Kovel-Volyn-2
Krasyliv	A		Krasyliv	Khmelnytskyi	2000		Krasyliv-Obolon, Podillya Khmelnytskyi, Podillya
Kremin Kremenchuk	P	3	Kremenchuk	Poltava	1959		Dzerzhynets, Torpedo, Dnipro
Kresy Tarnopol	D		Ternopil	Ternopil	1907	1939	
Kryla Rad Zaporizhzhia	D		Zaporizhzhia	Zaporizhzhia	1930s		
Krymteplytsia Molodizhne	D		Molodizhne	Crimea	1999		
Krystal Kherson	P	3	Kherson	Kherson	1961		Vodnyk, Spartak, Mayak, Budivelnyk, Lokomotyv, Tavriya, SC Kherson
Krystal Oleksandria	D		Oleksandriya	Kirovohrad	1930s		MFC Oleksandriya
Krystal Parkhomivka	D		Parkhomivka	Kharkiv	1950s		
Kryvbas Kryvyi Rih	A	5	Kryvyi Rih	Dnipropetrovsk	1959		Komanda Kryvoho Rohu, Avanhard, hirnyk
KSZN Rypne	D		Ripne	Ivano-Frankivsk	1930s	1939	
Lada Chernivtsi	D		Chernivtsi	Chernivtsi	1980s		
Lechia Lwów	D		Lviv	Lviv	1903	1939	
Lokomotyv Dnipropetrovsk	D		Dnipropetrovsk	Dnipropetrovsk	1930s		
Lokomotyv Donetsk	D		Donetsk	Donetsk	1958		
Lokomotyv Dvorichna	D		Dvorichna	Kharkiv	1950s	2006	Respublika
Lokomotyv Kharkiv	D		Kharkiv	Kharkiv	1925		
Lokomotyv Kotovsk	D		Podilsk	Odesa	1930s		Birzula, Lokomotyv-Birzula
Lokomotyv Kupiansk	A		Kupiansk	Kharkiv	1923		
Lokomotyv Kyiv	A		Kyiv	Kyiv	1919		Zheldor, Lokomotyv Pivdnya
Lokomotyv Odesa	D		Odesa	Odesa	1930s		
Lokomotyv Poltava	D		Poltava	Poltava	1930		
Lokomotyv Rivne	D		Rivne	Rivne	1940s		
Lokomotyv Synelnykove	D		Synelnykove	Dnipropetrovsk	1930s		
Lokomotyv Yasynuvata	D		Yasynuvata	Donetsk	1930s		
Lokomotyv Zaporizhzhia	D		Zaporizhzhia	Zaporizhzhia	1930s		Bilshovyk
Lozova	A		Lozova	Kharkiv	1930s		Lokomotyv, Avanhard
Luzhany	A		Luzhany	Chernivtsi	1947		Kolhospnyk, Kolos
Lviv	D	1	Lviv	Lviv	2006	2023	
LVVPU Lviv	D		Lviv	Lviv	1950s		
Lysychansk	A		Lysychansk	Luhansk	1930s		Stakhanovets, Donsoda, Shakhtar, Donets, Lysychansk-Proletariy
Maccabi Cernăuți	D		Chernivtsi	Chernivtsi	1909	1940	Blau-Weiß, Hakoah
Maccabi Kyiv	D		Kyiv	Kyiv	1919s		
Makkabi Równe	D		Rivne	Rivne	1918	1923	
Mashynobudivnyk Druzhkivka	D		Druzhkivka	Donetsk	1930s		Avanhard
Mashynobudivnyk Kyiv	D		Kyiv	Kyiv	1950s		
Mebelnyk Chernivtsi	D		Chernivtsi	Chernivtsi	1950s		
Metal Dnipropetrovsk	D		Dnipropetrovsk	Dnipropetrovsk	1950s		
Metalist Kharkiv	D		Kharkiv	Kharkiv	1925	2016	KhPZ, Dzerzhynets, Avanhard
Metalist 1925	P	2	Kharkiv	Kharkiv	2016		
Metalist Sevastopol	D		Sevastopol	Crimea	1950		
Metalurh Donetsk	D		Donetsk	Donetsk	1996	2015	
Metalurh Kupiansk	A		Kupiansk	Kharkiv	1950s		
Metalurh Novomoskovsk	A		Novomoskovsk	Dnipropetrovsk	1950s		
Metalurh Zaporizhzhia	D		Zaporizhzhia	Zaporizhzhia	1935		Stal
MFC Metalurh Zaporizhzhia	P	3	Zaporizhzhia	Zaporizhzhia	2017		
Meteor Dnipropetrovsk	D		Dnipropetrovsk	Dnipropetrovsk	1950s		
MHK Voznesensk	A		Voznesensk	Mykolaiv	1930s		Lokomotyv
Mistran Odesa	D		Odesa	Odesa	1911	1935	Vega
MlynKov Mlyniv	A		Mlyniv	Rivne	1950s		Ikva
Molniya Kharkiv	D		Kharkiv	Kharkiv	1930s		
Molniya Sieverodonetsk	D		Sieverodonetsk	Luhansk	2000	2005	
Mukacheve	A		Mukachevo	Zakarpattia	1948		Karpaty
Muncitorul Cernăuţi	D		Chernivtsi	Chernivtsi	1920s	1940	
Mykolaiv	P	2	Mykolaiv	Mykolaiv	1920		Zavod Naval, Marti-Badina, Raikom Metalistiv, Sudnobudivnyk, Dynamo, Avanhard, Budivelnyk, Evis, SC Mykolaiv
Mykolaiv	A	5	Mykolaiv	Lviv	1950s		Tsementnyk, Tsementnyk-Khorda, Tsementnyk-Lafarzh
Myr Hornostayivka	P	3	Hornostaivka	Kherson	1994		
Myrhorod	A		Myrhorod	Poltava	1950s		FC Petrivtsi, ZemlyaK
Nafkom Brovary	A		Brovary	Kyiv	1990s	2009	UFEI (Irpin), Akademiya (Irpin), Nafkom-Akademiya (Irpin)
Naftokhimik Kremenchuk	D		Kremenchuk	Poltava	1991	1996	
Naftovyk Dolyna	A		Dolyna	Ivano-Frankivsk	1955		
Naftovyk-Ukrnafta Okhtyrka	D		Okhtyrka	Sumy	1980		Naftovyk
Nikopol	P	3	Nikopol	Dnipropetrovsk	2009		Makiyivvuhillya
Nizhyn	A		Nizhyn	Chernihiv	1950s		Krystal
Nove Zhyttia Andriivka	A		Andriivka	Poltava	2008		
Nyva Bershad	A		Bershad	Vinnytsia	1950s		
Nyva Ternopil	P	3	Ternopil	Ternopil	1978		Nyva (Pidhaytsi), Nyva Berezhany
Nyva Vinnytsia	P	3	Vinnytsia	Vinnytsia	1958		Lokomotyv, FC Vinnytsia, Nyva-Svitanok
Nyva-Kosmos Myronivka	D		Myronivka	Kyiv	1950s		Nyva, Nyva-Borysfen
OBAK Odesa	D		Odesa	Odesa	1878	1917	
Obolon-Brovar	P	2	Kyiv	Kyiv	1992		Zmina, Zmina-Obolon, Obolon-PPO
ODEK Orzhiv	A	4	Orzhiv	Rivne	1972		Derevoobrobnyk, Fakel
Odeskyi HF Odesa	D		Odesa	Odesa	1909	1930s	
Odesa	D		Odesa	Odesa	1944	1999	OBO, SKVO, SKA, Zirka (Tiraspol)
Odesa	D		Odesa	Odesa	1947	2013	Dzerzhynets Ovidiopol, Dnister Ovidiopol
Okean Kerch	A		Kerch	Crimea	1930s		Stal, Metalurh, Avanhard, Voykovets, Portovyk, FC Kerch
Oleksandriya	P	1	Oleksandriya	Kirovohrad	1948		Shakhtar, Polihraftekhnika
Olimp Starobilsk	A		Starobilsk	Luhansk	1930s		Spartak, Start
Olimpik Donetsk	P	1	Donetsk	Donetsk	2001		
Olimpik Kharkiv	A		Kharkiv	Kharkiv	1958		Mayak
Olimpik Kirovohrad	A		Kropyvnytskyi	Kirovohrad	2000		
Olkom Melitopol	A		Melitopol	Zaporizhzhia	1991	2011	Torpedo
Oskil Kupiansk	D		Kupiansk	Kharkiv	1992	2003	
Palmira Odesa	D		Odesa	Odesa	1999	2005	Chornomorets-Lasunia, Lasunia, Lasunia-Transservis
Papirnyk Malyn	A		Malyn	Zhytomyr	1923		Chervona Zirka, Avanhard
Perechyn	A		Perechyn	Zakarpattia	1950s		
Pervomaysk	A		Pervomaisk	Mykolaiv	1950s		Budivelnyk, Merkuriy
Pivdenstal Yenakiieve	A		Yenakiieve	Donetsk	1930s		Stackanovets Ordzhonikidze, Metalurh, Industriya, Shakhtar
PKS Łuck	D		Lutsk	Lutsk	1920s	1939	
Podillia Tarnopil	D		Ternopil	Ternopil	1908	1939	
Podillya Kamyanets-Podilskyi	D		Kamianets-Podilskyi	Khmelnytskyi	1960	1980s	Elektron
Podillya Khmelnytskyi	P	3	Khmelnytskyi	Khmelnytskyi	1948		Dynamo Proskuriv, Dynamo, Khvylya, Nord-AM-Podillya
Pogoń Lwów	A	5	Lviv	Lviv	2009		
Pogoń Równe	D		Rivne	Rivne	1920s	1939	
Pogoń Stryj	D		Stryi	Lviv	1906	1939	
Pokuttia Kolomyia	A	4	Kolomyia	Ivano-Frankivsk	1982		Budivelnyk, Elektroosnastka
Polissia Zhytomyr	D		Zhytomyr	Zhytomyr	1959	2005	Avanhard, Avtomobilist, Spartak, Khimik
Polissia	P	3	Zhytomyr	Zhytomyr	2016		MFC Zhytomyr
Politekhniky Kyiv	D		Kyiv	Kyiv	1906		
Poltava	P	2	Poltava	Poltava	2007		
Portovyk Illichivsk	D		Chornomorsk	Odesa	1962		Enerhiya, Neptun-Portovyk
Probiy Horodenka	A		Horodenka	Ivano-Frankivsk	1924		Tsukrovyk, Kolos, Dnister
Prohres Berdychiv	D		Berdychiv	Zhytomyr	1940s		
Prołom Stanisławów	D		Ivano-Frankivsk	Ivano-Frankivsk	1929	1939	
Prometei Dniprodzerzhynsk	D		Kamianske	Dnipropetrovsk	1947	1970	Traktor, Khimik, Dniprovets
Prometei Dniprodzerzhynsk	D		Kamianske	Dnipropetrovsk	1991	1996	Radyst
Prykarpattya Ivano-Frankivsk	D		Ivano-Frankivsk	Ivano-Frankivsk	2004	2011	Fakel
Prykarpattia Ivano-Frankivsk	P	2	Ivano-Frankivsk	Ivano-Frankivsk	2016		Teplovyk, Teplovzk-Prykarpattia
Putrivka	A		Putrivka	Kyiv	2002		
RadTorhSluzhbovtsi Kyiv	D		Kyiv	Kyiv	1920s	1930s	
Ratusha Kamyanets-Podilskyi	A		Kamianets-Podilskyi	Khmelnytskyi	1950s		Burevisnyk, Tsementnyk, Petridava, Dynamo-Orbita, Obolon-Universytet, Enerhiya, Olimp, Olimp-Universytet
Rava Rava-Ruska	A		Rava-Ruska	Lviv	2001		Lokomotyv
Real Odesa	A		Odesa	Odesa	2002	2005	
Real Pharma Odesa	P	3	Pivdenne	Odesa	2000		Limed Pokrovske, Real Pokrovske-Liliya, Real Pokrovske
Rewera Stanisławów	D		Ivano-Frankivsk	Ivano-Frankivsk	1908	1939	
RKS Lwów	D		Lviv	Lviv	1921	1939	
Rohatyn	D		Rohatyn	Ivano-Frankivsk	1920s		Polonia-Strzelec, Kolos, Roksolana, Opillya, Tekhno-Center
Ros Bila Tserkva	A		Bila Tserkva	Kyiv	1983		Dynamo (Irpin), Dynamo, Transimpeks-Ros, Domobudivnyk, Rihonda
Rot-Front Kyiv	D		Kyiv	Kyiv	1930s		
Rot-Front Poltava	D		Poltava	Poltava	1930s		
Rud Zhytomyr	D		Zhytomyr	Zhytomyr	1990s	2000s	
Rukh Kyiv	D		Kyiv	Kyiv	1942	1942	
Rus Khust	A		Khust	Zakarpattia	1934		Andezyt, Fetrovyk
Rybak-Dorozhnyk Odesa	D		Odesa	Odesa	1993	1999	Rybak
Sambir	A		Sambir	Lviv	1931		Dnister, Lokomotyv, Bilshovyk, Spartak, Promin (Volya-Baranetska), Promin
SDYuShOR-Metalurh Zaporizhzhia	A		Zaporizhzhia	Zaporizhzhia	1951		
Shakhta Ukraina Ukrainsk	A		Ukrainsk	Donetsk	1950s		
Shakhtar Chervonohrad	A		Chervonohrad	Lviv	1957		
Shakhtar Donetsk	P	1	Donetsk	Donetsk	1936		Vuhilnyky, Stakhanovets
Shakhtar Dzerzhynsk	A		Toretsk	Donetsk	1950s		Start, Dzerzhynets
Shakhtar Horlivka	A		Horlivka	Donetsk	1913		FOGAZ, Metalist, Dynamo, Vuhilnyky, Avanhard, Vuhlyk
Shakhtar Kirovsk	A		Kirovsk	Luhansk	1950s		Iskra, Tsentrostal
Shakhtar Konotop	A		Konotop	Sumy	1930s		Lokomotyv, Slovyanets
Shakhtar Korostyshiv	A		Korostyshiv	Zhytomyr	1947		
Shakhtar Krasnyi Luch	A		Krasnyi Luch	Luhansk	1930s		Stakhanovets, Burevisnyk, DonbasAntratsyt
Shakhtar Luhansk	D		Luhansk	Luhansk	1977	2003	
Shakhtar Makiyivka	D		Makiivka	Donetsk	1930s	2005	Zavod im. Kirova, Stal, Avanhard, Kirovets, Bazhanovets
Shakhtar Novovolynsk	A		Novovolynsk	Volyn	1958		Shakhta N9
Shakhtar Rowenky	D		Rovenky	Luhansk	1995	1996	
Shakhtar Rutchenkove	D		Donetsk	Donetsk	1930s	1960	Shakhta N30, Stakhanovets
Shakhtar Smolyanka	D		Donetsk	Donetsk	1950s		
Shakhtar Snizhne	D		Snizhne	Donetsk	1920s		
Shakhtar Sverdlovsk	D		Sverdlovsk	Luhansk	1939	2014	Avanhard
Sharhorod	A		Sharhorod	Vinnytsia	1950s		Fortuna, O.L.KAR.
Sheremetyevskyi HS Odesa	D		Odesa	Odesa	1908	1921	
Shkirtrest Odesa	D		Odesa	Odesa	1924	1930s	
Shturm Kharkiv	D		Kharkiv	Kharkiv	1912	1925	Tsap-Tsarap
Silmash Kharkiv	D		Kharkiv	Kharkiv	1930s		Serp i Molot
Sirius Kryvyi Rih	D		Kryvyi Rih	Dnipropetrovsk	1959	1995	Avanhard (Zhovti Vody), Sirius (Zhovti Vody)
SKA Lviv	D		Lviv	Lviv	1949	2001	OBO, OSK, SKVO, SKA-Karpaty, SKA-Orbita
SKA Odesa	D		Odesa	Odesa	2011	2013	
SKAD-Yalpuh Bolhrad	A		Bolhrad	Odesa	1950s		Temp, Yalpuh, Olimp, SKAD-BSZ, Budzhak
Skala Stryi	D		Stryi	Lviv	1911	2009	
Skala Stryi (2004)	P	3	Stryi	Lviv	2004		FC Morshyn
SKA-Lotto Odesa	D		Odesa	Odesa	1995	1998	Lotto-GMC
SKChF Sevastopol	D		Sevastopol	Crimea	1954	1970s	BOF, SKF
Skhid Kyiv	A		Kyiv	Kyiv	1950s		
SKIF Kyiv	D		Kyiv	Kyiv	1930s		Tekhnikum Fizkultury, FShM
Skify Lviv	D		Lviv	Lviv	1950s		LAZ, Skify-LAZ
Slavutych	A		Slavutych	Kyiv	1950s		Transimpeks (Vyshneve), Transimpeks-Ros-2 Terezyne, Skhid, Nerafa, Slavutych ChAES
Cherkaskyi Dnipro	P	2	Cherkasy	Cherkasy	2010		
Slovkhlib Slovyansk	D		Sloviansk	Donetsk	1999	2012	
Sluch Berezne	A		Berezne	Rivne	1950s		
Sokal	A		Sokal	Lviv	1950s		Buh, Khimik
Sokil Berezhany	A		Berezhany	Ternopil	1982		Nyva, Lysonya, Sokil-Enerhetyk
Sokil Lviv	D		Lviv	Lviv	1950s		Sokil-Lorta
Sokil Radyvyliv	A		Radyvyliv	Rivne	1950s		
Sokil Zolochiv	A		Zolochiv	Lviv	1950s		Iskra, Burevisnyk
Sokół Równe	D		Rivne	Rivne	1910s	1939	
Sovignon Tayirove	A		Tairove	Odesa	1950s		Nyva
Sparta Lwów	D		Lviv	Lviv	1910	1939	
Spartak Chernihiv	D		Chernihiv	Chernihiv	1930s		
Spartak Chernivtsi	D		Chernivtsi	Chernivtsi	1929		
Spartak Dnipropetrovsk	D		Dnipropetrovsk	Dnipropetrovsk	1930s		
Spartak Ivano-Frankivsk	D		Ivano-Frankivsk	Ivano-Frankivsk	1940	2007	Prykarpattya
Spartak Kharkiv	D		Kharkiv	Kharkiv	1936		
Spartak Korosten	D		Korosten	Zhytomyr	1930s		
Spartak Kyiv	D		Kyiv	Kyiv	1930s		
Spartak Lviv	D		Lviv	Lviv	1939	1949	
Spartak Poltava	D		Poltava	Poltava	1930s		
Spartak Sumy	D		Sumy	Sumy	1982	2006	Yavir (Krasnopillia), Yavir-Sumy, Spartak, FC Sumy, Spartak-Horobyna
Spartak Vinnytsia	A		Vinnytsia	Vinnytsia	1930s		
Sport Kyiv	D		Kyiv	Kyiv	1907	1920s	
Sporting-Klub Odesa	D		Odesa	Odesa	1911	1919	Stad de Odesa
Sportinvest Kryvyi Rih	D		Kryvyi Rih	Dnipropetrovsk	1990s	1996	
Stakhanov	D		Kadiivka	Luhansk	1936		Stakhanovets, Shakhtar, Vahonobudivnyk, Dynamo
Stal Alchevsk	D		Alchevsk	Luhansk	1936	2015	Budivelnyk
Stal Kamianske	P	2	Kamianske	Dnipropetrovsk	1926		Metalist, Dzierzhynka, Zavod im. Dzerhynskogo, Metalurh
Stal Dnipropetrovsk	D		Dnipropetrovsk	Dnipropetrovsk	1936		Zavod im. Petrovskogo
Stal Kryvyi Rih	D		Kryvyi Rih	Dnipropetrovsk	1930s		
Stalinets Kharkiv	D		Kharkiv	Kharkiv	1930s		Elektromashynobudivnyi Zavod
Stanisławowia Stanisławów	D		Ivano-Frankivsk	Ivano-Frankivsk	1920s	1939	
Start Chuhuiv	A		Chuhuiv	Kharkiv	1950s		
Start Kyiv	D		Kyiv	Kyiv	1942	1942	Khlibzavod
Stroitel Pripyat	D		Pripyat	Kyiv	1970s	1988	
Strzelec Borysław	D		Boryslav	Lviv	1920s	1939	
Strzelec Broszniów	D		Broshniv-Osada	Ivano-Frankivsk	1920s	1939	
Strzelec Górka Stanisławów	D		Ivano-Frankivsk	Ivano-Frankivsk	1922	1939	
Strzelec Janowa Dolina	D		Bazaltove	Rivne	1920s	1939	
Strzelec Kowel	D		Kovel	Volyn	1920s	1939	
Strzelec Raz Dwa Trzy Stanisławów	D		Ivano-Frankivsk	Ivano-Frankivsk	1920s	1939	
Sula Lubny	A		Lubny	Poltava	1985		Zirka, FC Lubny
Sumy	P	2	Sumy	Sumy	1999		Yavir (Krasnopillia)
Suputnyk Poltava	D		Poltava	Poltava	1950s		
Surozh Sudak	D		Sudak	Crimea	1950s		
Tavriya Novotroitske	A		Novotroitske	Kherson	1950s		
Tavriya Simferopol	P	3	Simferopol	Crimea	1958		Avanhard
Tekhnikum Fizkultury Dnipropetrovsk	D		Dnipropetrovsk	Dnipropetrovsk	1930s		
Temp Kyiv	D		Kyiv	Kyiv	1925		Arsenal
Temp Shepetivka	A		Shepetivka	Khmelnytskyi	1990		Temp-Advis-2, FC Shepetivka
Temp Vinnytsia	D		Vinnytsia	Vinnytsia	1930s		
Ternopil	P	3	Ternopil	Ternopil	2000		
TESP Kałusz	D		Kalush	Ivano-Frankivsk	1920s	1939	
Torez	A		Torez	Donetsk	1930s		Stakhanovets Chystiakovo, Shakhtar, Krystal, Shakhtar-Prohres
Torpedo Kharkiv	D		Kharkiv	Kharkiv	1930s		Traktornyi Zavod, Traktor
Torpedo Mykolaiv	A		Mykolaiv	Mykolaiv	1954		Avanhard
Torpedo Odesa	D		Odesa	Odesa	1930s		
Torpedo Zaporizhzhia	D		Zaporizhzhia	Zaporizhzhia	1923		Metalist, Silmash, Mashynobudivnyk
Troyanda-Ekspres Hirka Polonka	D		Hirka Polonka	Volyn	1950s		
Tsukrovyky Sumy	D		Sumy	Sumy	1930s		
Tyras-2500 Bilhorod-Dnistrovskyi	A		Bilhorod-Dnistrovskyi	Odesa	1930s		Tyras Cetatea Albă, Portovyk, Polimer, Zenit, Dnister, Budivelnyk, Dnistrovets
Tytan Armyansk	D		Armyansk	Crimea	1969	2014	Budivelnyk
Tytan Donetsk	A		Donetsk	Donetsk	2002		
Tytan Vilnohirsk	A		Vilnohirsk	Dnipropetrovsk	1950s		Avanhard
Tytan Zaporizhzhia	D		Zaporizhzhia	Zaporizhzhia	1950s		
Uholyok Myrnohrad	D		Myrnohrad	Donetsk	1950s		
Uholyok Krasnoarmiysk	D		Pokrovsk	Donetsk	1930s		Stakhanovets
UkrAhroKom Holovkivka	D		Holovkivka	Kirovohrad	2008	2014	
Ukraina Lviv	D		Lviv	Lviv	1911	1944	
Vahonobudivnyk Kremenchuk	A		Kremenchuk	Poltava	1950		
Vatra Drohobych	D		Drohobych	Lviv	1930s	1944	
Veres Rivne	P	3	Rivne	Rivne	1957		Kolhospnyk, Horyn, Avanhard
Viktor Zaporizhzhia	D		Zaporizhzhia	Zaporizhzhia	1990s		
Vodnyk Kyiv	D		Kyiv	Kyiv	1930s		
Vodnyk Mykolaiv	D		Mykolaiv	Mykolaiv	1946		
Vodnyk Odesa	D		Odesa	Odesa	1930s		
Volyn Lutsk	P	2	Lutsk	Lutsk	1960		Torpedo, SC Lutsk, Volyn-1
Vorskla Poltava	P	1	Poltava	Poltava	1955		Kolhospnyk, Kolos, Silbud, Budivelnyk, Vorskla-Naftohaz
VPS Kharkiv	D		Kharkiv	Kharkiv	1940s		
Vykhor Dnipropetrovsk	D		Dnipropetrovsk	Dnipropetrovsk	1950s		
Vympel Kyiv	D		Kyiv	Kyiv	1930s		
Wawel Cernăuţi	D		Chernivtsi	Chernivtsi	1907	1940	Sarmatia, Dorost Sokoły, Viktoria, Polonia
WKS Dubno	D		Dubno	Rivne	1920s	1939	
WKS Łuck	D		Lutsk	Lutsk	1920s	1939	
Yalos Yalta	D		Yalta	Crimea	2005	2006	
Yalynka Velykyi Bychkiv	A		Velykyi Bychkiv	Zakarpattia	1950s		Khimik
Yavir Smila	A		Smila	Cherkasy	1950s		Lokomotyv, Tyasmyn, FC Smila, Dnipro-2
Yednist' Plysky	А	4	Plysky	Chernihiv	2001		
Zavod im. K.Libknechta Dnipropetrovsk	D		Dnipropetrovsk	Dnipropetrovsk	1930s		
Zavod im. Kominternu Dnipropetrovsk	D		Dnipropetrovsk	Dnipropetrovsk	1930s		
Zavod im. Lenina Krasnohorivka	D		Krasnohorivka	Donetsk	1930s		
Zdorovya Kharkiv	D		Kharkiv	Kharkiv	1930s		
Zenit Boyarka	D		Boyarka	Kyiv	1950s		Boyarka-2006, Inter
Zenit Kharkiv	D		Kharkiv	Kharkiv	1930s		
Zenit Kyiv	D		Kyiv	Kyiv	1930s		
Zenit Stalino	D		Donetsk	Donetsk	1930s		
FC Zhemchuzhyna Odesa	D		Odesa	Odesa	2013	2018	
Zhemchuzhyna Yalta	P		Yalta	Crimea	2010	2014	
Zhytomyr	D		Zhytomyr	Zhytomyr	2005	2006	
Zhytychi Zhytomyr	D		Zhytomyr	Zhytomyr	2005	2006	
Zirka Berdychiv	D		Berdychiv	Zhytomyr	1980s		
Zirka Kropyvnytskyi	P	2	Kropyvnytskyi	Kirovohrad	1911		Elvorti, Chervona Zirka, Metalist, Silmash, Traktor, Torpedo, Dynamo, Zirka-NIBAS
Znannya Kherson	D		Kherson	Kherson	1930s		
Zorya Khorostkiv	D		Khorostkiv	Ternopil	1950s	2006	
Zorya Luhansk	P	1	Luhansk	Luhansk	1923		Metalist, Dzerzhynets, Trudovi Rezervy, Avanhard, Zorya-MALS
Zvyahel-750 Novohrad-Volynskyi	A		Novohrad-Volynskyi	Zhytomyr	2007		Avanhard

== List of Ukrainian professional football clubs (teams of masters) ==
- 1936 (sp) (9 teams): Dynamo Kyiv, Dynamo Dnipropetrovsk, Dynamo Kharkiv, Dynamo Odesa, Spartak Kharkiv, Ugolschiki Stalino, Lokomotyv Kyiv, Traktornyi Zavod Kharkiv, Stal Dnipropetrovsk
- 1936 (fl) (1 team): Serp i Molot Kharkiv
- 1937 (1 team): Zavod im. Frunze Kostiantynivka
- 1939 (2 teams): Sudnobudivnyk Mykolaiv, Dzerzhynets Voroshylovhrad
- 1940 (1 team): Kharchovyk Odesa
- 1946 (3 teams): Spartak Uzhhorod, DO Kyiv, Bilshovyk Zaporizhzhia
- 1947 (5 teams): Lokomotyv Kharkiv, Spartak Lviv, Spartak Kherson, Dzerzhynets Kharkiv, Dynamo Voroshylovhrad
- 1948 (4 teams): Lokomotyv Zaporizhzhia, Avanhard Kramatorsk, Shakhtar Kadiivka, Bilshovyk Mukachevo
- 1949 (3 teams): Spartak Kyiv, Dynamo Chernivtsi, Trudovi Rezervy Voroshylovhrad
- 1953 (2 teams): Metalurh Odesa, Metalurh Zaporizhzhia
- 1954 (2 teams): ODO Lviv, DOF Sevastopol
- 1955 (1 team): DOF Odesa
- 1956 (1 team): Spartak Ivano-Frankivsk
- 1957 (2 teams): Kolhospnyk Poltava, Khimik Dniprodzerzhynsk
- 1958 (7 teams): Zirka Kirovohrad, Kolhospnyk Cherkasy, Avanhard Simferopol, Lokomotyv Vinnytsia, Kolhospnyk Rivne, Lokomotyv Donetsk, SKVO Odesa
- 1959 (5 teams): Arsenal Kyiv, Avanhard Zhytomyr, Kryvyi Rih, Avanhard Ternopil, Shakhtar Horlivka
- 1960 (9 teams): Avanhard Zhovti Vody, Avanhard Chernivtsi, Volyn Lutsk, Naftovyk Drohobych, Desna Chernihiv, Dynamo Khmelnytskyi, Azovstal Zhdanov, Khimik Severodonetsk, Avanhard Sumy
- 1962 (2 teams): Trubnyk Nikopol, Shakhtar Oleksandria
- 1963 (6 teams): Karpaty Lviv, Dnipro Kremenchuk, Burevisnyk Melitopol, Metalurh Komunarsk, Metalurh Yenakieve, Metalurh Kerch
- 1964 (3 teams): Temp Kyiv, Chaika Balaklava, Dunayets Izmail
- 1965 (4 teams): Dynamo-2 Kyiv, Avtomobilist Odesa, Shakhtar Torez, Shakhtar Krasnyi Luch
- 1966 (3 teams): Avanhard Makiivka, Start Dzerzhynsk, Torpedo Berdiansk
- 1967 (3 teams): Enerhia Nova Kakhovka, Stal Dnipropetrovsk, Sitall Kostiantynivka
- 1968 (9 teams): Shakhtar Chervonohrad, Kolos Yakymivka, Prohres Berdychiv, Podillia Kamianets-Podilskyi, Shakhtar Novovolynsk, Ugolyok Krasnoarmiisk, Avanhard Rovenky, Shakhtar Sverdlovsk, Lokomotyv Dnipropetrovsk
- 1969 (2 teams): Budivelnyk Pervomaisk, Avanhard Antratsyt
- 1970 (1 team): Shakhtar Kirovsk
- 1972 (2 teams): Mayak Kharkiv, Shakhtar Makiivka
- 1976 (1 team): Kolos Nikopol
- 1979 (1 team): Metalurh Dniprodzerzhynsk
- 1981 (1 team): Kolos Mezhyrich
- 1983 (1 team): Nyva Berezhany
- 1984 (1 team): Dynamo Irpin
- 1985 (1 team): Torpedo Zaporizhzhia
- 1986 (1 team): Naftovyk Okhtyrka
- 1991 (4 teams): Avtomobilist Sumy, Mayak Ochakiv, Temp Shepetivka, Karpaty Kamianka-Buzka

== List of second teams ==
The very first second team in Ukraine that entered league competitions was established by the predecessor of MFC Mykolaiv, Sudnobudivnyk (Sudostroitel). Sudnobudivnyk-2 started to play back in 1937. Participation of second teams during the Soviet period was sporadic and rare particularly at republican and the All-Union levels. Some "teams of masters" also used alternative teams known as "klubnaya" teams, particularly Dynamo Kyiv and Shakhtar Donetsk.

- Sudnobudivnyk-2 Mykolaiv (1937, 1939, 1940, 1946–1949, 1977, 1978, 1985, 1996/97, 2017/18 – 2020/21)
- Dynamo-2 Kyiv (1938, 1939, 1965, 1992–2015/16)
  - Dynamo Kyiv (klubnaya, 1948, 1950, 1951, 1956)
  - Dynamo-3 Kyiv (+ 1992/93 – 1994/95, 1996/97– 2007/08)
- Lokomotyv-2 Kyiv (1938)
- Vorskla-2 (Kolhospnyk-2) Poltava (1959, 1997/98 – 2004/05, 2024/25)
- Shakhtar-2 Donetsk (+ 1992 – 2005/06)
  - Shakhtar Donetsk (klubnaya, 1967, 1984 – 1986)
  - Shakhtar-3 Donetsk (+ 2000/01 – 2014/15)
- Lokomotyv Kherson (klubnaya, 1965)
- Chornomorets-2 Odesa (+ 1992 – 1994/95, 1999/2000 – 2003/04, 2010/11, 2011/12, 2019/20)
- Karpaty-2 Lviv (+ 1997/98 – 2009/10)
  - Karpaty-3 Lviv (+ 2001/02 – 2003/04)
- Dnipro-2 Dnipropetrovsk (+ 1997/98 – 2003/04, 2010/11, 2011/12)
  - Dnipro-3 Dnipropetrovsk (+ 2000/01, 2001/02)
- Metalist-2 Kharkiv (+ 1997/98 – 2004/05)
  - Metalist-3 Kharkiv (+ 1999)
- Zirka-2 Kirovohrad (+ 1997/98 – 1999/2000)
- Metalurh-2 Donetsk (+ 1997/98, 2001/02 – 2003/04)
- Desna-2 Chernihiv (+ 2008)
- Polissya-2 Zhytomyr (+ 2008)
- Borysfen-2 Shchaslyve (+ 2008)
- Yednist-2 Plysky (+)
- Bukovyna-2 Chernivtsi (+)
- Kryvbas-2 Kryvyi Rih (+)
- Arsenal-2 Kharkiv (+)
- CSKA-3 Kyiv (+)
- Obolon-2 Kyiv (+)
- Polihraftekhnika-2 Oleksandriya (+)
- Inhulets-2 Petrove (+)
  - Inhulets-3 Petrove (+)
- Bastion-2 Illichivsk (+)
- Kremin-2 Kremenchuk (+ 2019/20)
- Naftovyk-2 Okhtyrka (+)
- Metalurh-2 Zaporizhia (+)
- Borysfen Dnipro (+ 2019/20, 2020/21)

== List of football clubs admitted to professional by skipping the league's tier ==
This list includes association football clubs that were admitted to professional competitions without playing at the Ukrainian national amateur level (formerly KFK competitions). The list includes clubs that were admitted to professional tiers under any circumstances other than following the league's pyramid structure. Almost every year there was at least one club that was promoted without playing at the national amateur competitions with various types of excuses.

1992 season

- second teams: FC Dynamo-2 Kyiv, FC Shakhtar-2 Donetsk, FC Chornomorets-2 Odesa

1992–93 season

- FC Avanhard Zhydachiv (dissolved in 1996)
- FC Dynamo Luhansk (merged with FC Metalurh Mariupol in 1995)

1993–94 season

- FC Medyk Morshyn (relegated in 1994)
- FC Viktor Zaporizhzhia (dissolved in 2000)
- FC Lviv (1992) (merged with FC Karpaty Lviv in 2001)
- FC Boryspil (dissolved in 2014)

1994–95 season

- none (but with the ongoing season FC Slavutych while playing at amateurs replaced professional FC Transimpeks Vyshneve)

1995–96 season

- FC Ratusha Kamianets-Podilskyi (random team to finish the season for FC Temp Shepetivka)
- FC Metalurh Donetsk (merged with FC Stal Kamianske in 2015, due to the Russian aggression against Ukraine)

1996–97 season

- FC Petrivtsi (dissolved in 2000)
- FC Nyva Bershad

1997–98 season

- FC Berkut Bedevlya (dissolved in 1998)
- FC SKA-Lotto Odesa (dissolved in 1998)
- FC Hirnyk Pavlohrad (dissolved in 1998)
- FC Borysfen Boryspil (dissolved in 2007)
- second teams: FC Karpaty-2 (later FC Karpaty-3 Lviv), FC Dnipro-2 Dnipropetrovsk, FC Zirka-2 Kirovohrad, FC Vorskla-2 Poltava, FC Metalurh-2 Donetsk, FC Metalist-2 Kharkiv (by replacing FC Avanhard Merefa)

1998–99 season

- FC VPS Kramatorsk (dissolved in 1999)
- second teams: FC Kryvbas-2 Kryvyi Rih, FC Metalurh-2 Zaporizhzhia

Note: after this season amateur competitions were transitioned back to the Soviet competition calendar spring–fall

1999–00 season

- FC ADOMS Kremenchuk (dissolved in 2001)
- FC Mashynobudivnyk Druzhkivka (dissolved in 2002)
- second teams: FC Prykarpattia-2 Ivano-Frankivsk, FC Nyva Vinnytsia (second team of FC Vinnytsia), FC Chornomorets-2 Odesa (in place of SC Odesa)

2000–01 season

- FC Krasyliv (dissolved in 2007)
- FC Sokil Zolochiv (dissolved in 2003)
- second teams: Ternopil-Nyva-2, FC Dnipro-3 Dnipropetrovsk, FC Cherkasy-2, FC Metalurh-2 Mariupol, FC Stal-2 Alchevsk, FC Shakhtar-3 Donetsk, SSSOR-Metalurh Zaporizhzhia

2001–02 season

- FC Chornohora Ivano-Frankivsk (dissolved in 2006)
- FC Chaika Sevastopol (dissolved in 2002)
- FC Dynamo Simferopol (dissolved in 2009)
- FC Torpedo Zaporizhzhia (relegated in 2003)
- second teams: FC Zakarpattia-2 Uzhhorod, FC Borysfen-2 Boryspil, FC Obolon-2 Kyiv, FC Metalurh-2 Donetsk, FC Karpaty-2 Lviv replaced FC Lviv (1992) and at the same time FC Karpaty-3 Lviv replaced FC Karpaty-2 Lviv (also there was admitted FC Kovel-Volyn-2 in place of FC Kovel)

2002–03 season

- PFC Sevastopol (dissolved in 2014, due to the Russian aggression against Ukraine)
- second teams: none (introduction of the Ukrainian junior competitions among professional teams)

2003–04 season

- FC Palmira Odesa (dissolved in 2005)
- second teams: FC Kryvbas-2 Kryvyi Rih, FC Arsenal-2 Kyiv (FC Spartak-2 Kalush replaced promotable FC LUKOR Kalush to avoid relegation of FC Spartak Ivano-Frankivsk)

2004–05 season

- FC Fakel Ivano-Frankivsk (dissolved in 2012)
- PFC Oleksandriya
- MFC Oleksandriya
- second teams: none (introduction of Ukrainian junior competitions among top league teams)

2005–06 season

- FC Kharkiv (promoted to the top league instead of FC Arsenal Kharkiv)
- FC Knyazha Shchaslyve
- MFC Zhytomyr (FC Polissya Zhytomyr withdrew and its place were created MFC Zhytomyr and OFC Zhytychi Zhytomyr)
- FC Yalos Yalta
- second teams: FC Kryvbas-2 Kryvyi Rih, FC Nyva-2 Vinnytsia, FC Kharkiv-2

2006–07 season

Second League reduced to two groups

- none

2007–08 season

- FC Korosten
- FC Komunalnyk Luhansk
- FC Poltava
- FC Titan Donetsk
- FC Olimpik Kirovohrad
- second teams: none

2008–09 season

- second teams: FC Desna-2 Chernihiv, FC Knyazha-2 Shchaslyve, PFC Sevastopol-2

2009–10 season

- FC Morshyn (later changed to FC Skala Stryi (2004))
- second teams: FC Lviv-2

2010–11 season

- second teams: FC Chornomorets-2 Odesa, FC Dnipro-2 Dnipropetrovsk

2011–12 season

- second teams: FC Sevastopol-2

2012–13 season

- second teams: FC Poltava-2-Karlivka (later FC Karlivka), FC Obolon-2 Kyiv

2013–14 season

Second League reduced to a single group

- none

2014–15 season

- none (no promotions whatsoever)

2015–16 season

- FC Veres Rivne
- FC Arsenal-Kyiv
- FC Barsa Sumy
- second teams: none

2016–17 season

- second teams: FC Illichivets-2 Mariupol

2017–18 season

Second League returned to two groups

- SC Dnipro-1
- second teams: MFC Mykolaiv-2

2018–19 season

- none, the newly promoted FC Lviv has swapped places with the Premier League club FC Veres Rivne

== List of clubs that were merged (split) ==
- FC Arsenal Kyiv (originally as FC Boryspil)
  - FC Nyva Myronivka (1993–94)
  - FC CSKA Kyiv (1995–2001)
- FC Mariupol
  - FC Dynamo Luhansk
- FC Spartak Ivano-Frankivsk
  - FC Kalush
- FC Karpaty Lviv
  - FC Lviv (1992)
- FC Temp Shepetivka
  - FC Advis Khmelnytskyi
- FC Poltava
  - FC Karlivka
- FC Ros Bila Tserkva
  - FC Transimpeks Vyshneve
- FC Enerhiya Yuzhnoukrainsk
  - FC Artania Ochakiv
- FC Krasyliv
  - FC Obolon Kyiv
  - FC Podillya Khmelnytskyi
- FC Metalist Kharkiv
  - FC Avanhard Merefa
- FC Stal Kamianske
  - FC Metalurh Donetsk
- FC Volyn Lutsk
  - FC Kovel
- FC Chornomorets Odesa
  - SC Odesa
- FC Borysfen Boryspil
  - FC Systema-Boreks Borodyanka
- FC Oleksandriya
  - FC UkrAhroKom Holovkivka
- FC Slavutych Cherkasy
  - FC Zorya Biloziria

=== List of clubs successors after relocation ===
- FC Boryspil → FC CSKA-Borysfen Kyiv (eventually FC Arsenal Kyiv)
- FC Systema-Boreks Borodyanka → FC Inter Boyarka
- FC Transimpeks Vyshneve → FC Slavutych
- FC Makiyivvuhillya Makiivka → FC Nikopol
- FC Temp Shepetivka → FC Ratusha Kamianets-Podilskyi
- FC Stal Kamianske → FC Feniks Bucha
- FC Hazovyk Komarno → FC Hazovyk-Skala Stryi → FC Lviv
- FC Karpaty Kamianka-Buzka → FC Skala Stryi
- FC Morshyn → FC Skala Stryi (2004)
- FC Karpaty Kamianka-Buzka → FC Halychyna Lviv
- FC Yavir Krasnopillia → FC Spartak Sumy
- FC Yavir Krasnopillia → PFC Sumy
- SKA Lviv → FC Halychyna Drohobych
- FC Dnister Ovidiopol → FC Odesa
- FC Avanhard Zhovti Vody → FC Sirius Kryvyi Rih
- FC Petrivtsi → FC Myrhorod

== List of clubs that were split (revival of original club) ==
- FC CSKA-Borysfen Kyiv → FC CSKA Kyiv → FC Arsenal Kyiv
  - FC Borysfen Boryspil (revival of original)
- FC Zorya Luhansk
  - FC Komunalnyk Luhansk
- FC Nyva Ternopil
  - FC Ternopil
- FC Arsenal Kharkiv
  - FC Kharkiv
- FC Spartak Sumy
  - FC Yavir Krasnopillia (revival of original) → PFC Sumy
- FC Skala Stryi
  - FC Karpaty Kamianka-Buzka (revival of original) → FC Halychyna Lviv
- FC Shakhtar Shakhtarsk
  - FC Metalurh Donetsk
- FC Polissya Zhytomyr
  - MFC Zhytomyr
  - OFC Zhytychi Zhytomyr
- FC Oleksandriya
  - FC UkrAhroKom Holovkivka (revival of original)

== List of clubs that were "swapped" ==
- FC Zirka Kirovohrad ←→ FC Olimpik Kirovohrad
- FC Spartak Ivano-Frankivsk ←→ FC Kalush (concealed by merger)
- FC Veres Rivne ←→ FC Lviv
