= 1993–94 Ukrainian Football Amateur League =

Ukrainian Football Amateur League
- Season: 1993-1994
- Champions: None (6 group winners): LAZ Lviv (Group 1); Advis Khmelnytskyi (Group 2); Transimpeks Vyshneve (Group 3); Avanhard Rovenky (Group 4); Metalurh Novomoskovsk (Group 5); Tavriya Novotroitsk (Group 6)
- Runner up: FC Lada Chernivtsi, FC Keramik Baranivka, FC Sula Lubny, FC Vahbud Kremenchuk, FC Shakhtar Horlivka, FC Dnistrovets B.-Dnistrovskyi
- Top goalscorer: Oleksandr Dovhalets (FC Advis Khmelnytskyi) 27

The 1993–94 Football championship of Ukraine among amateurs was the second season of the nationwide amateur competitions in the independent Ukraine and was known as the football competitions of fitness collectives or KFK for short. The tournament was conducted under auspices of the Football Federation of Ukraine before creation of the Ukrainian Football Amateur Association.

As last year, the competition consisted of six groups that were divided by regional principal. The number of teams that competed has increased to 87 teams.

The top two of each group were allowed to enter the transitional league next season.

== Teams ==
=== Location map ===
Locations of team home grounds in the 1993-94 Ukrainian Championship among amateur teams

=== Composition ===
Group 1		Group 2		Group 3	
Region	Teams	Region	Teams	Region	Teams
Volyn Oblast (2)	Silmash Kovel	Ivano-Frankivsk Oblast (1)	Domobudivnyk Burshtyn	Kyiv (2)	Dynamo-3 Kyiv
Volyn Oblast (2)	Shakhta 9 Novovolynsk	Rivne Oblast (1)	Izotop Kuznetsovsk	Kyiv (2)	Olimpik Kyiv
Lviv Oblast (4)	Shakhtar Chervonohrad	Ternopil Oblast (2)	Sokil Berezhany	Kyiv Oblast (3)	Budivelnyk Brovary
Lviv Oblast (4)	LAZ Lviv	Ternopil Oblast (2)	Zoria Khorostkiv	Kyiv Oblast (3)	Transimpeks Vyshneve
Lviv Oblast (4)	Sokil Lviv	Khmelnytskyi Oblast (3)	Tsementnyk Kamianets-Podliskyi	Kyiv Oblast (3)	Ahro-Blyskavka Baryshivka
Lviv Oblast (4)	Hirnyk Novoyavorivsk	Khmelnytskyi Oblast (3)	Sluch Krasyliv	Cherkasy Oblast (1)	Yatran Uman
Lviv Oblast (4)	Hirnyk Novoyavorivsk	Khmelnytskyi Oblast (3)	Advis Khmelnytskyi	Kirovohrad Oblast (1)	Lokomotyv Znamianka
Zakarpattia Oblast (3)	Aval Dovhe	Zhytomyr Oblast (2)	Keramik Baranivka	Chernihiv Oblast (2)	Tekstylnyk Chernihiv
Zakarpattia Oblast (3)	Elektron Volovets	Zhytomyr Oblast (2)	Polissya Korosten	Chernihiv Oblast (2)	Ahroservis Bakhmach
Zakarpattia Oblast (3)	Yalynka Velykyi Bychkiv	Kyiv (2)	Obolon-Zmina Kyiv	Sumy Oblast (4)	Kharchovyk Popivka
Ivano-Frankivsk Oblast (4)	Khimik Kalush	Kyiv (2)	Obolon-Zmina Kyiv	Sumy Oblast (4)	Lokomotyv Konotop
Ivano-Frankivsk Oblast (4)	Halychyna Broshniv	Kyiv (2)	Kray Kyiv	Sumy Oblast (4)	Budivelnyk Sumy
Ivano-Frankivsk Oblast (4)	Limnytsia Perehinske	Kyiv (2)	Kray Kyiv	Sumy Oblast (4)	Spartak Okhtyrka
Ivano-Frankivsk Oblast (4)	Pokuttia Kolomyia	Vinnytsia Oblast (1)	Santa-Maria Kryzhopil	Poltava Oblast (2)	Sula Lubny
Chernivtsi Oblast (1)	Lada Chernivtsi	Vinnytsia Oblast (1)	Santa-Maria Kryzhopil	Poltava Oblast (2)	Hirnyk Komsomolsk

Group 4		Group 5		Group 6	
Region	Teams	Region	Teams	Region	Teams
Poltava Oblast (2)	Lokomotyv Poltava	Kharkiv Oblast (2)	Avanhard Lozova	Crimea (2)	More Feodosiya
Poltava Oblast (2)	Vahonobudivnyk Kremenchuk	Kharkiv Oblast (2)	Avanhard Lozova	Crimea (2)	Chaika Okhotnykove
Kharkiv Oblast (2)	Avanhard Merefa	Kharkiv Oblast (2)	Metalurh Kupiansk	Odesa Oblast (6)	Dunay Izmail
Kharkiv Oblast (2)	Avanhard Merefa	Kharkiv Oblast (2)	Metalurh Kupiansk	Odesa Oblast (6)	Blaho Blahoyeve
Kharkiv Oblast (2)	Yupiter-Skif Kharkiv	Zaporizhzhia Oblast (1)	Nyva-Viktor Novomykolaivka	Odesa Oblast (6)	Torpedo Odesa
Kharkiv Oblast (2)	Yupiter-Skif Kharkiv	Zaporizhzhia Oblast (1)	Nyva-Viktor Novomykolaivka	Odesa Oblast (6)	Enerhiya Illichivsk
Dnipropetrovsk Oblast (1)	Prometei Dniprodzerzhynsk	Dnipropetrovsk Oblast (4)	Metalurh Novomoskovsk	Odesa Oblast (6)	Dnistrovets Bilhorod-Dnistr.
Zaporizhzhia Oblast (1)	Enerhiya Berdiansk	Dnipropetrovsk Oblast (4)	Shakhtar Marhanets	Odesa Oblast (6)	Birzula Kotovsk
Donetsk Oblast (6)	Koral Torez	Dnipropetrovsk Oblast (4)	Hirnyk Pavlohrad	Dnipropetrovsk Oblast (2)	Kolos Chkalove
Donetsk Oblast (6)	Shakhtar Snizhne	Dnipropetrovsk Oblast (4)	Budivelnyk Kryvyi Rih	Dnipropetrovsk Oblast (2)	Kryvbas-2 Kryvyi Rih
Donetsk Oblast (6)	Harant Donetsk	Donetsk Oblast (6)	Shakhtar Horlivka	Mykolaiv Oblast (3)	Merkuriy Pervomaisk
Donetsk Oblast (6)	Kirovets Makiivka	Donetsk Oblast (6)	Vuhlyk Donetsk	Mykolaiv Oblast (3)	Olimpiya Yuzhnoukrainsk
Donetsk Oblast (6)	Azovmash Mariupol	Donetsk Oblast (6)	Donbaskraft Kramatorsk	Mykolaiv Oblast (3)	Nyva Nechayane
Donetsk Oblast (6)	Vuhlyk Dymytriv	Donetsk Oblast (6)	Kholodna Balka Makiivka	Kherson Oblast (4)	Kolos Osokorivka
Luhansk Oblast (3)	Avanhard Rovenky	Donetsk Oblast (6)	Pivdenstal Yenakieve	Kherson Oblast (4)	Slavuta Novovorontsovka
Luhansk Oblast (3)	Ayaks Krasnyi Luch	Donetsk Oblast (6)	Shakhtar Donetsk	Kherson Oblast (4)	Enerhiya Nova Kakhovka
Luhansk Oblast (3)	Metalurh Lutyhine	Luhansk Oblast (1)	Shakhtar Sverdlovsk	Kherson Oblast (4)	Tavriya Novotroitske

== Group 1 ==
Pos	Team	Pld	W	D	L	GF	GA	GD	Pts	Promotion
1	LAZ Lviv (C)	26	20	0	6	62	24	+38	40	Promoted; (+) new
2	Lada Chernivtsi	26	17	5	4	47	17	+30	39	Promoted
3	Pokuttia Kolomyya	26	17	4	5	46	19	+27	38	
4	Limnytsia Perehinsk	26	15	2	9	33	25	+8	32	(+) new
5	Yalynka Rakhiv Raion	26	13	1	12	49	40	+9	27	
6	Khimik Kalush	26	11	4	11	34	32	+2	26	
7	Aval Dovhe	26	12	1	13	35	46	−11	25	
8	Silmash-Len Kovel	26	10	5	11	30	31	−1	25	
9	Elektron Volovets	26	10	3	13	34	46	−12	23	(+) new
10	Halychyna Broshniv	26	9	5	12	39	38	+1	23	
11	Sokil-LORTA Lviv	26	8	7	11	32	43	−11	23	
12	Shakhta 9 Novovolynsk	26	8	3	15	28	42	−14	19	
13	Shakhtar Chervonohrad	26	7	4	15	16	37	−21	18	
14	Hirnyk Novoyavorivsk	26	2	2	22	21	66	−45	6	

Source: Season's results at FootPass. Football Federation of Ukraine.
(C) Champions

== Group 2 ==
Pos	Team	Pld	W	D	L	GF	GA	GD	Pts	Promotion
1	Advis Khmelnytskyi (C)	22	18	2	2	66	13	+53	38	Promoted
2	Keramik Baranivka	22	14	5	3	43	19	+24	33	Promoted
3	Obolon-Zmina Kyiv	22	14	5	3	32	17	+15	33	(+) new
4	Zoria Khorostkiv	22	12	6	4	30	15	+15	30	
5	Domobudivnyk Burshtyn	22	9	6	7	25	28	−3	24	(+) new
6	Polissia Korosten	22	9	6	7	23	27	−4	24	(+) new
7	Sluch Krasyliv	22	7	3	12	25	41	−16	17	
8	Kray Kyiv	22	7	3	12	25	43	−18	17	
9	Santa-Maria Kryzhopil	22	5	6	11	16	33	−17	16	(+) new
10	Sokil Berezhany	22	5	6	11	12	29	−17	16	(−) new
11	Izotop Kuznetsovsk	22	3	7	12	16	34	−18	13	(+) new
12	Tsementnyk K.-Podilskyi	22	0	3	19	2	16	−14	3	(+) new; withdrew

Source: Season's results at FootPass. Football Federation of Ukraine
(C) Champions

== Group 3 ==
Relocated

- Budivelnyk Ivankiv to Brovary

Pos	Team	Pld	W	D	L	GF	GA	GD	Pts	Promotion
1	Transimpeks Vysheneve (C)	28	20	1	7	66	20	+46	41	Promoted; (+) new
2	Sula Lubny	28	15	9	4	43	27	+16	39	Promoted
3	Ahroservis Bakhmach	28	16	5	7	60	31	+29	37	
4	FC Cheksyl Chernihiv	28	16	4	8	40	28	+12	36	
5	Hirnyk Komsomolsk	28	15	5	8	33	26	+7	35	
6	Kharchovyk Popivka	28	14	5	9	52	36	+16	33	(+) new
7	Lokomotyv Konotop	28	13	7	8	59	40	+19	33	
8	Budivelnyk Sumy	28	13	5	10	52	36	+16	31	
9	Dynamo-3 Kyiv	28	11	8	9	39	33	+6	30	
10	Spartak Okhtyrka	28	10	7	11	35	39	−4	27	
11	Lokomotyv Znamyanka	28	10	3	15	33	48	−15	23	
12	Olimpik Kyiv	28	5	9	14	25	41	−16	19	(+) new
13	Budivelnyk Brovary	28	5	6	17	29	47	−18	16	
14	Yatran Uman	28	5	6	17	28	54	−26	16	(+) new
15	Ahro-Blyskavka Baryshivka	28	1	2	25	15	103	−88	4	(+) new

Source: Season's results at FootPass. Football Federation of Ukraine
(C) Champions

== Group 4 ==
Renamed

- Ayaks Krasnyi Luch was called Koral
- Metalurh Lutuhine was called MALS

Pos	Team	Pld	W	D	L	GF	GA	GD	Pts	Promotion
1	Avanhard Rovenky (C)	28	24	4	0	72	19	+53	52	Promoted
2	Vahbud Kremenchuk	28	23	2	3	56	16	+40	48	Promoted
3	Krystal Torez	28	18	5	5	61	27	+34	41	
4	Shakhtar Snizhne	28	16	2	10	36	33	+3	34	
5	Prometei Dniprodzerzhynsk	28	15	4	9	26	28	−2	34	(−) new
6	Harant Donetsk	28	14	4	10	43	46	−3	32	
7	Avanhard Merefa	28	13	4	11	32	22	+10	30	(+) new
8	Kirovets Makiivka	28	10	9	9	39	36	+3	29	(+) new
9	Ayaks Krasnyi Luch	28	12	3	13	32	47	−15	27	
10	Azovmash Mariupol	28	12	2	14	40	37	+3	26	
11	Enerhiya Berdiansk	28	8	6	14	19	41	−22	22	
12	Vuhlyk Dymytriv	28	6	5	17	27	57	−30	17	
13	Yupiter-SKIF Kharkiv	28	4	4	20	15	62	−47	12	(+) new
14	Lokomotyv Poltava	28	3	4	21	10	23	−13	10	(+) new; withdrew
15	Metalurh Lutyhine	28	2	0	26	12	26	−14	4	withdrew

Source: Season's results at FootPass. Football Federation of Ukraine
(C) Champions

== Group 5 ==
Pos	Team	Pld	W	D	L	GF	GA	GD	Pts	Promotion
1	Metalurh Novomoskovsk (C)	26	18	3	5	50	23	+27	39	Promoted; (+) new
2	Shakhtar Horlivka	26	17	5	4	36	18	+18	39	Promoted; (−) new
3	Shakhtar Sverdlovsk	26	14	6	6	54	26	+28	34	
4	Nyva-Viktor Novomykolaivka	26	13	5	8	43	19	+24	31	(+) new
5	Metalurh Kupiansk	26	10	7	9	32	24	+8	27	
6	Vuhlyk Donetsk	26	10	7	9	29	24	+5	27	
7	Shakhtar Marhanets	26	13	0	13	30	42	−12	26	(+) new
8	Donbaskraft Kramatorsk	26	10	4	12	45	42	+3	24	
9	Hirnyk Pavlohrad	26	8	8	10	30	27	+3	24	
10	Avanhard Lozova	26	9	5	12	24	36	−12	23	
11	Kholodna Balka Makiivka	26	9	3	14	24	39	−15	21	(+) new
12	Pivdenstal Yenakiyeve	26	9	3	14	32	51	−19	21	
13	Shakhtar Donetsk-Lidiyevka	26	8	5	13	30	49	−19	21	(+) new
14	Budivelnyk Kryvyi Rih	26	3	1	22	14	53	−39	7	

Source: Season's results at FootPass. Football Federation of Ukraine
(C) Champions

== Group 6 ==
Pos	Team	Pld	W	D	L	GF	GA	GD	Pts	Promotion
1	Tavria Novotroitsk (C)	32	20	6	6	58	30	+28	46	Promoted
2	Dnistrovets B.-Dnistrovskyi	32	20	4	8	59	44	+15	44	Promoted
3	Blaho Ivanivsky Raion	32	17	8	7	48	29	+19	42	
4	Enerhiya Illichivsk	32	17	6	9	50	36	+14	40	
5	Chaika Saky Raion	32	17	5	10	36	34	+2	39	(+) new
6	Olimpiya Yuzhnoukrainsk	32	16	7	9	46	40	+6	39	
7	Dunay Izmail	32	15	9	8	41	30	+11	39	
8	Birzula Kotovsk	32	15	7	10	49	38	+11	37	(+) new
9	Kolos Nikopol Raion	32	14	4	14	43	43	0	32	(+) new
10	Torpedo Odesa	32	14	4	14	32	35	−3	32	
11	Nyva Mykolaiv Raion	32	13	5	14	33	34	−1	31	(+) new
12	Kryvbas-2 Kryvyi Rih	32	10	6	16	29	46	−17	26	(+) new
13	Enerhiya Nova Kakhovka	32	8	8	16	26	51	−25	24	
14	Slavuta Novovorontsovka	32	10	3	19	34	67	−33	23	(+) new
15	More Feodosia	32	10	2	20	26	14	+12	22	(−) new; withdrew
16	Merkuriy Pervomaisk	32	8	6	18	28	48	−20	22	(+) new
17	Kolos Osokorivka	32	1	2	29	12	31	−19	4	disqualified

(C) Champions

== Promotion ==
To the 1994–95 Ukrainian Third League were promoted all six group winners and their six runners-up (total 12 teams) FC LAZ Lviv, FC Lada Chernivtsi, FC Advis Khmelnytskyi, FC Keramik Baranivka, FC Transimpeks Vyshneve, FC Sula Lubny, FC Avanhard Rovenky, FC Vahonobudivnyk Kremenchuk, FC Metalurh Novomoskovsk, FC Shakhtar Horlivka, FC Tavria Novotroitske, FC Dnistrovets Bilhorod-Dnistrovskyi.

== Number of teams by region ==
Number	Region	Team(s)
12	Donetsk Oblast	Azovmash Mariupol, Donbaskraft Kramatorsk, Harant Donetsk, Kholodna Balka Makiivka, Kirovets Makiivka, Koral Torez, Pivdenstal Yenakieve, Shakhta Lidievka Donetsk, Shakhtar Horlivka, Shakhtar Snizhne, Vuhlyk Donetsk, Vuhlyk Dymytrov
7	Dnipropetrovsk Oblast	Budivelnyk Kryvyi Rih, Hirnyk Pavlohrad, Kolos Chkalove, Kryvbas-2 Kryvyi Rih, Metalurh Novomoskovsk, Prometei Dniprodzerzhynsk, Shakhtar Marhanets
6	Odesa Oblast	Birzula Kotovsk, Blaho Blahoyeve, Dnistrovets Bilhorod-Dnistrovskyi, Dunai Izmail, Enerhia Illichivsk, Torpedo Odesa
5	Ivano-Frankivsk Oblast	Domobudivnyk Burshtyn, Halychyna Broshniv, Khimik Kalush, Limnytsia Perehinske, Pokuttia Kolomyia
4	Lviv Oblast	Shakhtar Chervonohrad, Hirnyk Novoyavorivsk, LAZ Lviv, Sokil-LORTA Lviv
4	Kharkiv Oblast	Avanhard Lozova, Avanhard Merefa, Metalurh Kupiansk, Yupiter Kharkiv
4	Kherson Oblast	Enerhia Nova Kakhovka, Kolos Osokorivka, Tavria Novotriotske, Slavuta Novovorontsovka
4	Kyiv	Dynamo-3, Krai, Obolon-Zmina, Olimpik
4	Luhansk Oblast	Avanhard Rovenky, Ayaks Krasnyi Luch, Metalurh Lutuhine, Shakhtar Sverdlovsk
4	Poltava Oblast	Hirnyk Komsomolsk, Lokomotyv Poltava, Sula Lubny, Vahonobudivnyk Kremenchuk
4	Sumy Oblast	Budivelnyk Sumy, Kharchovyk Popivka, Lokomotyv Konotop, Spartak Okhtyrka
3	Khmelnytskyi Oblast	Advis Khmelnytskyi, Sluch Krasyliv, Tsementnyk Kamianets-Podilskyi
3	Kyiv Oblast	Budivelnyk Brovary, Transimpeks Vyshneve, Ahro-Blyskavka Baryshivka
3	Mykolaiv Oblast	Merkuriy Pervomaisk, Olimpia AES Yuzhnoukrainsk, Nyva Nechayane
3	Zakarpattia Oblast	Aval Dovhe, Elektron Volovets, Yalynka Velykyi Bychkiv
2	Autonomous Republic of Crimea	Chaika Okhotnykove, More Feodosia
2	Chernihiv Oblast	Ahroservis Bakhmach, Tekstylnyk Chernihiv
2	Ternopil Oblast	Sokil Berezhany, Zorya Khorostkiv
2	Volyn Oblast	Silmash Kovel, Shakhta 9 Novovolynsk
2	Zaporizhia Oblast	Enerhia Berdiansk, Nyva-Viktor Novomykolaivka
1	Cherkasy Oblast	Yatran Uman
1	Kirovohrad Oblast	Lokomotyv Znamianka
1	Rivne Oblast	Izotop Kuznetsovsk
1	Vinnytsia Oblast	Santa-Maria Kryzhopil
