= Zhytomyr Oblast Football Association =

The Oblast's coat of arms

Zhytomyr Oblast Football Association is a football governing body in the region of Zhytomyr Oblast, Ukraine. The association is a member of the Regional Council of UAF and the collective member of the UAF itself.

Football competitions take place since 1945.

== Presidents ==
- 2007–2011 Oleksandr Chernyavskyi
- 2011–2016 Oleksandr Kotsyubko
  - 2011–2013 Yuriy Opanashchuk
- 2016–present Ruslan Pavlyuk

== Previous champions ==
- 1945 Dynamo Zhytomyr (1)
- 1946 Dynamo Zhytomyr (2)
- 1947 Dynamo Zhytomyr (3)
- 1948 Dynamo Zhytomyr (4)
- 1949 Dynamo Zhytomyr (5)
- 1950 Dynamo Zhytomyr (6)
- 1951 Dynamo Zhytomyr (7)
- 1952 Dynamo Zhytomyr (8)
- 1953 Dynamo Zhytomyr (9)
- 1954 Dynamo Zhytomyr (10)
- 1955 Baranivka Porcelain Factory (1)
- 1956 Kolhospnyk Zhytomyr (1)
- 1957 Burevisnyk Novohrad-Volynskyi (1)
- 1958 Avanhard Zhytomyr (1)
- 1959 Shakhtar Korostyshiv (1)
- 1960 Shakhtar Korostyshiv (2)
- 1961 Prohres Berdychiv (1)
- 1962 Prohres Berdychiv (2)
- 1963 Prohres Berdychiv (3)
- 1964 Elektrovymiryuvach Zhytomyr (1)
- 1965 Elektrovymiryuvach Zhytomyr (2)
- 1966 Elektrovymiryuvach Zhytomyr (3)
- 1967 Elektrovymiryuvach Zhytomyr (4)
- 1968 Elektrovymiryuvach Zhytomyr (5)
- 1969 Elektrovymiryuvach Zhytomyr (6)
- 1970 Elektrovymiryuvach Zhytomyr (7)
- 1971 Elektrovymiryuvach Zhytomyr (8)
- 1972 Elektrovymiryuvach Zhytomyr (9)
- 1973 Elektrovymiryuvach Zhytomyr (10)
- 1974 Elektrovymiryuvach Zhytomyr (11)
- 1975 Elektrovymiryuvach Zhytomyr (12)
- 1976 Torpedo Zhytomyr (1)
- 1977 Prohres Berdychiv (4)
- 1978 Elektrovymiryuvach Zhytomyr (13)
- 1979 Shkiryanyk Berdychiv (1)
- 1980 Elektrovymiryuvach Zhytomyr (14)
- 1981 Elektrovymiryuvach Zhytomyr (15)
- 1982 Prohres Berdychiv (5)
- 1983 Torpedo Zhytomyr (2)
- 1984 Prohres Berdychiv (6)
- 1985 Prohres Berdychiv (7)
- 1986 Prohres Berdychiv (8)
- 1987 Prohres Berdychiv (9)
- 1988 Prohres Berdychiv (10)
- 1989 Papirnyk Malyn (1)
- 1990 Keramik Baranivka (2)
- 1991 Papirnyk Malyn (2)
- =independence of Ukraine=
- 1992 Keramik Baranivka (3)
- 1993 Keramik Baranivka (4)
- 1994 Krok Zhytomyr (1)
- 1995 Papirnyk Malyn (3)
- 1996 Budivelnyk Zhytomyr (1)
- 1997 Systema-KKhP Cherniakhiv (1)
- 1998 Systema-KKhP Cherniakhiv (2)
- 1999 Systema-KKhP Cherniakhiv (3)
- 2000 Rud Zhytomyr (1)
- 2001 Rud Zhytomyr (2)
- 2002 Systema-KKhP Cherniakhiv (4)
- 2003 Khimmash Korosten (1)
- 2004 Khimmash Korosten (2)
- 2005 Khimmash Korosten (3)
- 2006 FC Berdychiv (1)
- 2007 Lehion Zhytomyr (1)
- 2008 Metalurh Malyn (1)
- 2009 Khimmash Korosten (4)
- 2010 Zvyahel-750 Novohrad-Volynskyi (1)
- 2011 (spring) Lehion Zhytomyr (2)
- 2011 (autumn) FC Barashi (1)
- 2012 SC Korosten (1)
- 2013 Polissya Horodnytsia (1)
- =Russo-Ukrainian War=
- 2014 SC Korosten (2)
- 2015 SC Korosten (3)
- 2016 SC Korosten (4)
- 2017 Polissya Horodnytsia (2)
- 2018 Polissya Stavky (1)
- 2019 Zvyahel Novohrad-Volynskyi (2)
- 2020 Zvyahel Novohrad-Volynskyi (3)
- 2021 Polissya Stavky (2)
- =full-scale Russian invasion=

=== Top winners ===
- 15 – Elektrovymiryuvach Zhytomyr
- 10 – Dynamo Zhytomyr
- 10 – Prohres Berdychiv
- 4 – 4 clubs (Korosten, Khimmash, Systema-KKhP, Keramik)
- 3 – 2 clubs (Papirnyk Malyn, Zviahel)
- 2 – 6 clubs (Polissia H., Lehion, Rud, Shakhtar, Torpedo, Polissia S.)
- 1 – 9 clubs

== Professional clubs ==
- FC Polissya Zhytomyr (Avangard, Spartak, Avtomobilist), 1959–2005, 2017– (55 seasons)
  - Polissya-2, 2024– (a season)
- FC Prohres Berdychiv, 1968, 1969 (2 seasons)

- FC Keramik Baranivka, 1994–1997 (3 seasons)
- FC Papirnyk Malyn, 1996–2000 (4 seasons)
- FC Systema-KKhP Cherniakhiv, 1996–1997 (a season)
- FC Zhytychi Zhytomyr, 2005–2006 (a season)
- MFC Zhytomyr, 2005–2006 (a season)
- SC Korosten, 2007–2009 (2 seasons)
- PFC Zviahel, 2022–2024 (2 seasons)

== Other clubs at national/republican level ==
Note: the list includes clubs that played at republican competitions before 1959 and the amateur or KFK competitions after 1964.

- Zhytomyr, 1936–1938, 1954, 1956
- Berdychiv, 1936–1938
- Korosten, 1936–1938
- Novohrad-Volynskyi, 1937, 1938
- Voskhod Zhytomyr, 1939
- Dynamo Zhytomyr, 1940, 1946–1950, 1952, 1953, 1955
- Spartak Zhytomyr, 1948, 1949, 1951
- DO Zhytomyr, 1948, 1949
- Mashynobudivnyk Berdychiv, 1948, 1949
- v/c Berdychiv, 1948
- Chervona Prapor Malyn, 1949
- Chervona Zirka Malyn, 1957
- Kolhospnyk Zhytomyr, 1957
- Shakhtar Korostyshiv, 1958, 1959
- Avanhard Zhytomyr, 1958
- Avanhard Malyn, 1959, 1969
- Prohres Berdychiv, 1964 – 1966, 1978, 1979, 1983, 1985 – 1991
- Avanhard Novohrad-Volynskyi, 1967, 2011, 2013
- Enerhetyk Zhytomyr, 1968
- Shkirianyk Berdychiv, 1970, 1977, 1978, 1980, 1992/93
- Elektrovymiriuvach Zhytomyr, 1970 – 1972, 1974 – 1976, 1979, 1981, 1982
- Lokomotyv Korosten, 1973
- Torpedo Zhytomyr, 1977
- Papirnyk Malyn, 1983 – 1987, 1990, 1995/96
- Zirka Zhytomyr, 1986 – 1988
- Zirka Chudniv, 1989
- Khimmash Korosten, 1989, 2006, 2010
- Khimik-Krok Zhytomyr, 1990, 1991
- Keramik Baranivka, 1990 – 1993/94
- Fortuna Andrushivka, 1992/93
- Polissia Korosten, 1993/94
- Budivelnyk Zhytomyr, 1996/97
- Berd Berdychiv, 1996/97
- KKhP Cherniakhiv, 1997/98 – 2002
- Tytan Irshansk, 2001
- SC Korosten, 2004, 2011
- Metalurh Malyn, 2006 – 2008, 2011
- Polissia-2 Zhytomyr, 2008
- Zviahel-750 Novohrad-Volynskyi, 2010
- Arsenal Zhytomyr, 2011
- Lehion Zhytomyr, 2012, 2014
- Mal Korosten, 2015
- MFC Zhytomyr, 2016, 2016/17
- Zviahel Novohrad-Volynskyi, 2021/22
- Vivad Romaniv, 2023/24, 2024/25

== See also ==
- FFU Council of Regions
