= 1994–95 Ukrainian Third League =

Ukrainian Third League
- Season: 1995–96
- Champions: CSKA Kyiv
- Relegated: Tavriya Novotroitsk; Shakhtar Horlivka; Sula Lubny; Lada Chernivtsi; Fetrovyk Khust; Dnister Zalischyky
- Top goalscorer: 24 – M.Kovalchuk (CSKA); V.Pobehayev (Systema)

1994–95 Ukrainian Third League was the last season of the experimental Third League. For the following year the league was consolidated into the Druha Liha. All the teams that placed above 17th place were welcome to apply for participation in the Druha Liha along with any successful amateur teams.

The season started on August 14, 1994, with the final round being played on July 2, 1995. The newly reformed CSKA won the top awards. However, those medals were snatched from under the nose of the leading Nyva Myronivka who were in the lead with only two rounds to go. Those, together with the Tysmenytsia men, were the main challengers for the gold by the end of the season. This was the last year that the relegated clubs left the league and if Shakhtar Stakhanov was showing some determination for a victory, Zalishchyky were pretty much forced out of the league by various circumstances, such as poor performance.

== Team change ==
=== Relegated team ===
Two teams were relegated from the 1993–94 Ukrainian Second League.

- FC Dnister Zalishchyky – 21st place (debut)
- FC Shakhtar Stakhanov – 22nd (last) place (debut)

=== Promoted teams ===
Six group winners and six runners-up of 1993–94 Ukrainian Football Amateur League

- FC LAZ Lviv – winner of the Group 1 (debut)
- FC Lada Chernivtsi – runner-up of the Group 1 (debut)
- FC Advis Khmelnytskyi – winner of the Group 2 (debut)
- FC Keramik Baranivka – runner-up of the Group 2 (debut)
- FC Transimpeks Vyshneve – winner of the Group 3 (debut)
- FC Sula Lubny – runner-up of the Group 3 (debut)
- FC Avanhard Rovenky – winner of the Group 4 (debut)
- FC Vahonobudivnyk Kremenchuk – runner-up of the Group 4 (debut)
- FC Metalurh Novomoskovsk – winner of the Group 5 (debut)
- FC Shakhtar Horlivka – runner-up of the Group 5 (returning after 1 season, last competed in the 1992-93 season)
- FC Tavria Novotroitske – winner of the Group 6 (debut)
- FC Dnistrovets Bilhorod-Dnistrovskyi – runner-up of the Group 6 (debut)

== Final standings ==
Pos	Team	Pld	W	D	L	GF	GA	GD	Pts	Promotion or relegation
1	CSKA Kyiv (P)	42	32	5	5	81	28	+53	101	Promoted to Second League
2	Nyva Myronivka (P)	42	30	8	4	65	17	+48	98	Promoted to Second League
3	Khutrovyk Tysmenytsia (P)	42	29	8	5	73	26	+47	95	Promoted to Second League
4	Torpedo Melitopol (P)	42	24	11	7	51	31	+20	83	Promoted to Second League
5	Oskil Kupiansk (P)	42	25	5	12	50	32	+18	80	Promoted to Second League
6	Systema-Borex Borodianka (P)	42	23	6	13	61	31	+30	75	Promoted to Second League
7	Avanhard-Industria Rovenky (P)	42	23	4	15	59	50	+9	73	Promoted to Second League
8	Metalurh Novomoskovsk (P)	42	21	2	19	59	60	−1	65	Promoted to Second League
9	Skify-LAZ Lviv (P)	42	20	5	17	51	52	−1	65	Promoted to Second League
10	Keramik Baranivka (P)	42	20	5	17	46	52	−6	65	Promoted to Second League
11	Advis Khmelnytsyi (P)	42	18	7	17	56	55	+1	61	Promoted to Second League
12	Shakhtar Stakhanov (P)	42	18	6	18	56	62	−6	60	Promoted to Second League
13	Dnistrovets Bilhorod Dnistrovskyi (P)	42	15	11	16	39	51	−12	56	Promoted to Second League
14	Vahonobudivnyk Kremenchuk (P)	42	14	9	19	38	54	−16	51	Promoted to Second League
15	Skhid Slavutych (P)	42	14	9	19	35	51	−16	51	Promoted to Second League
16	Avanhard Zhydachiv (P)	42	14	9	19	42	65	−23	51	Promoted to Second League
17	Tavriya Novotroitske (R)	42	14	4	24	37	79	−42	46	Relegated to amateur league
18	Shakhtar Horlivka (R)	42	11	3	28	29	73	−44	36	Relegated to amateur league
19	Sula Lubny (R)	42	7	7	28	24	33	−9	28	Relegated to amateur league
20	Lada Chernivtsi (R)	42	7	5	30	21	32	−11	26	Relegated to amateur league
21	Fetrovyk Khust (R)	42	6	3	33	18	35	−17	21	Relegated to amateur league
22	Dnister Zalischyky (R)	42	5	4	33	18	40	−22	19	Relegated to amateur league

(P) Promoted; (R) Relegated

Notes

- Dnister, Fetrovyk, Lada, and Sula withdrew from the league.
- Hart changed its name to Systema-Borex
- CSK ZSU changed its name to CSKA
- Avanhard-Industiya was known simply as Avanhard
- Skify-LAZ was known as LAZ

Ukrainian Third League 1994-95 winners

First title

== Top scorers ==
- Mykola Kovalchuk (CSKA) - 24
- Viktor Pobehayev (Systema) - 24 (3)
- Vadym Vus (CSKA) - 17

== Transimpeks-Slavutych situation ==
The recently promoted Transimpeks was based in Vyshneve, then the club moved to Trezine where it changed its name to Transimpeks-Ros-2 (as a second team for FC Ros Bila Tserkva). Both clubs went through some financial difficulties and Transimpeks ended up with the greater impact. The administration of Ros could not afford another team and replaced it with amateurs from Kyiv Oblast. Skhid Slavutych this season was competing in the amateur competitions, at first being situated in Yahotyn and later relocating all the way to Slavutych. By the end of the season Skhid Slavutych was promoted to the Third League to replace the "purged" Transimpeks, forfeiting all its games in the amateur competitions. Skhid, however, managed not to get relegated and was allowed to be promoted to the Second League becoming a professional club. In four of its games Skhid earned four points by winning one home game in Slavutych and earning a draw in Bilhorod.

== See also ==
- Ukrainian Second League 1994-95
- Ukrainian First League 1994–95
- Amateur championship 1994-1995
- 1994–95 Ukrainian Cup
