= 2019 Football Championship of Zhytomyr Oblast =

Football Championship of Zhytomyr Oblast
- Season: 2019
- Champions: Zviahel Novohrad-Volynskyi

The 2019 Football Championship of Zhytomyr Oblast was won by Zviahel Novohrad-Volynskyi.

== League table ==
Pos	Team	Pld	W	D	L	GF	GA	GD	Pts
1	Zviahel Novohrad Volynskyi (C)	15	11	4	0	58	11	+47	37
2	Mal Korosten	15	11	2	2	46	19	+27	35
3	Polissia Stavky	15	10	2	3	39	22	+17	32
4	Polissia Horodnytsia	15	8	3	4	29	15	+14	27
5	FC Berdychiv	15	7	2	6	33	28	+5	23
6	Ahrolaif Popilnia Raion	15	5	2	8	22	37	−15	17
7	Arsenal-DLH Ovruch	15	3	1	11	18	41	−23	10
8	Budivelnyk Hranitne	15	1	0	14	18	54	−36	3
9	Keramik Baranivka (W)	8	0	0	8	7	43	−36	0

Source: "Підсумкова турнірна таблиця. Сезон-2019". Zhytomyr Oblast Association of Football. Archived from the original on 2019-12-16.
(C) Champions; (W) Withdrew
