= Oleksandr Lebedynets =

Ukrainian footballer

Personal information
- Date of birth: 8 August 1984 (age 42)
- Place of birth: Zolochiv, Kharkiv Oblast, Soviet Union
- Height: 1.90 m (6 ft 3 in)
- Position: Defender

Senior career*
| Years | Team | Apps | (Gls) |
| 2001–2002 | FC Metalist-2 Kharkiv | 24 | (1) |
| 2003–2009 | FC Helios Kharkiv | 184 | (24) |
| 2010 | FC Prykarpattya Ivano-Frankivsk | 11 | (1) |
| 2010–2013 | FC Arsenal Bila Tserkva | 86 | (9) |
- * Club domestic league appearances and goals as of 31 December 2013

Oleksandr Lebedynets (Ukrainian: Олександр Лебединець (born on 8 August 1984 in Zolochiv, Kharkiv Oblast) is a professional Ukrainian football player. He started his career for Metalist Kharkiv-2 and played there from 2001 to 2002. During that period he occasionally played for the semi-professional team FC Lokomotyv Liubotyn. In 2003–2009 he played for FC Helios Kharkiv.

== See also ==
- Football in Ukraine
- List of football clubs in Ukraine
