= SC Skify Lviv =

Ukrainian football club

SC Skify Lviv (Ukrainian: Спортивний клуб «Скіфи» Львів, romanized: Sportyvnyi klub «Skify» Lviv; Russian: Спортивный клуб «Скифы» Львов, romanized: Sportivnyj klub «Skify» L'vov) was a historical Ukrainian football club from Lviv.

FC LAZ Lviv used to represent the Lviv Bus Factory (LAZ).

In the 1993-94 season, FC LAZ Lviv won Zone 1 of the Ukrainian Amateur League (Любительська ліга України). This earned them promotion into the professional pyramid for the 1994/95 Ukrainian Third League. The club competed as FC LAZ for nearly the entire 1994-95 season and changed its name to Skify LAZ just weeks before the season ended.

In summer 1995, the Third League was abolished and merged into the Ukrainian Second League (Group A). At that point, the club dropped the "LAZ" and registered as SC Skify Lviv.

After completing first half of the season in autumn 1995, SC Skify officially withdrew from the league when the factory cut its financial support, resulting in technical losses for the remaining games.

The club was permanently dissolved in 1996.

== See also ==
- List of football clubs in Ukraine
- Football in Ukraine
- 1994–95 Ukrainian Third League
- 1995–96 Ukrainian Second League
