= Hirka Polonka =

Hirka Polonka Гірка Полонка
- Village
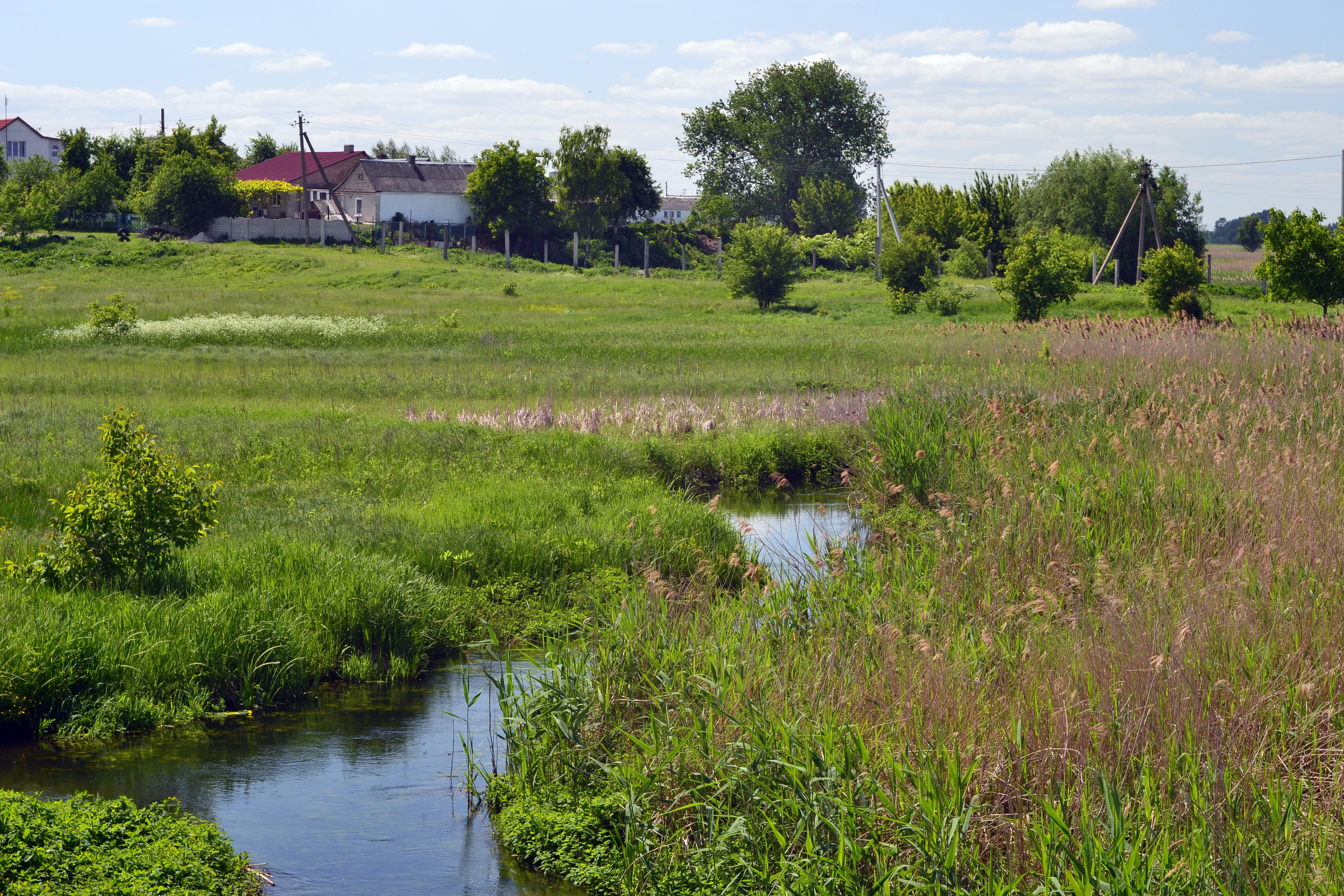
- Chornoguzka hydrological reserve on the outskirts of Hirka Polonka

- Location in Ukraine
- Coordinates: 50°41′N 25°15′E
- Country: Ukraine
- Oblast: Volyn Oblast
- Raion: Lutsk Raion
- Village founded: 1545

Area
  - Total: 2.177 km^{2} (0.841 sq mi)
- Elevation: 181 m (594 ft)

Population (2024)
  - Total: 3,000
  - Density: 1,220.95/km^{2} (3,162.2/sq mi)
- Time zone: UTC+2 (EET)
  - Summer (DST): UTC+3 (EEST)
- Postal code: 45607
- Area code: +380 332

Hirka Polonka (Ukrainian: Гірка Полонка) is a village in the Lutsk Raion, Volyn Oblast, Ukraine. The village has a population of 3,000.
