= FC Lada Chernivtsi =

FC Lada Chernivtsi was a Ukrainian football club from Chernivtsi, Chernivtsi Oblast.

== League and cup history ==
Season	Div.	Pos.	Pl.	W	D	L	GS	GA	P	Domestic Cup	Europe	Notes
1992–93	4th	3	24	15	2	7	43	24	32			Zone 1
1993–94	4th	2	26	17	5	4	47	17	39			Zone 1, Promoted
1994–95	3rd (lower)	20	42	7	5	30	21	32	26			withdrew
