= FC Transimpeks Vyshneve =

Ukrainian football club from Vyshneve, Kyiv Oblast

FC Transimpeks Vyshneve was a Ukrainian football club from Vyshneve, Kyiv Oblast.

== History ==
The club entered Ukrainian national competitions in 1993. It started at the 1993–94 Ukrainian Football Amateur League where the club won its group 3 and was promoted to the 1994–95 Ukrainian Third League. While playing in the Third League during a winter break merged with FC Ros Bila Tserkva and was renamed FC Transimpeks-Ros-2 Vyshneve. The main team moved to village of Trezyne located in Bila Tserkva Raion. However, the Bila Tservka club was not able to maintain its new second team and Transimpeks was withdrawn near the end of season. In its place was put a club from amateur league Nerefa Slavutych which forfeited the rest of its games in amateur league. The Football Federation of Ukraine later awarded the Transimpeks record to FC Nerefa Slavutych.

== League and cup history ==
Season	Div.	Pos.	Pl.	W	D	L	GS	GA	P	Domestic Cup	Europe	Notes
1993–94	4th	1	28	20	1	7	66	20	41			promoted
1994–95	3rd (lower)	–	38	13	8	17	31	45	47			withdrew
