= FC Advis Khmelnytskyi =

Ukraine football club

FC Advis Khmelnytskyi was a Ukrainian football club from Khmelnytskyi. Originally, the team competed under the name of Traktor.

The club was formed out of a factory football team of the Khmelnytskyi Engine Assembly Plant. In 1990, the Plant was renamed ADVIS, an acronym (Aggregate, DVyhuny, Instrument, Service).

In 1992, ADVIS competed in the 1992–93 Ukrainian Football Amateur League and was a favorite in their group 2. ADVIS, however, finished second, 4 points behind FC Khutrovyk Tysmenytsia. Among notable players, 30-year-old forward Oleksandr Dovhalets played for ADVIS that season. The next season, ADVIS won their group 2 with 5 points ahead of FC Keramik Baranivka and FC Obolon-Zmina Kyiv. Oleksandr Dovhalets became the top scorer in the group. ADVIS received promotion to the Ukrainian Transitional League.

ADVIS began their 1994–95 Ukrainian Third League season under Hryhoriy Ishchenko's management. They played their first game on 14 August 1994, hosting FC Metalurh Novomoskovsk. The game ended in a 1:1 draw. Their first win came in the next round. On 17 August 1994, when hosting FC Torpedo Melitopol, they won 2:1 with Dovhalets scoring the game-winning goal. That season, ADVIS finished 11th among 22 participants, while Dovhalets was among the best goalscorers that season. It was the last season of the league, and the top 16 teams were admitted to the Second League, while the rest were relegated to amateurs.

Soon, in the 1990s, the Khmelnytskyi ADVIS Plant went bankrupt. In 1995, the club merged with another Khmelnytskyi Oblast football club FC Temp Shepetivka that was recently relegated from the 1994–95 Vyshcha Liha (Level 1). After which, in place of Temp in the 1995–96 Ukrainian First League, appeared Temp-Advis playing in Khmelnytskyi, while in place of Advis, playing in the 1995–96 Ukrainian Second League, appeared Temp-Advis-2 playing in Shepetivka. Thus, FC Advis Khmelnytskyi became the second squad of the new Temp-Advis club. However, after playing only seven games in a new season, Temp-Advis-2 withdrew, and their results were annulled. Temp-Advis did not last long either and withdrew during the 1995–1996 winter break.

== League and cup history ==
Season	Div.	Pos.	Pl.	W	D	L	GS	GA	P	Domestic Cup	Europe	Notes
