= SC Korosten =

FC Korosten
- Full name: FC Korosten
- Founded: 2001
- Ground: "Spartak"
- Capacity: 2,500
- League: Zhytomyr Oblast League
- 2014–15: N/A

FC Korosten (Ukrainian: ФК Коростень) is a Ukrainian amateur football club based in the town of Korosten in Zhytomyrska oblast. The club was participating in Ukrainian Second League. It was founded in 2001 on the base of sports school Lokomotyv that is part of the Physical Culture and Sports Association Ukrayina.

After not arriving for their 22nd-round game against Veres Rivne in the 2008–09 season the PFL expelled FC Korosten from the professional leagues. The club became the first one to be expelled officially. In 2009 the club was dissolved. In 2010 it was recreated on the base of own youth football club Korosten as Sports Club Korosten.

== League and cup history ==
Season	Div.	Pos.	Pl.	W	D	L	GS	GA	P	Domestic Cup	Europe	Notes
2007–08	3rd "A"	8	30	11	11	8	26	22	44	Did not enter		
2008–09	3rd "A"	15	32	8	2	22	24	42	23	1/32 finals		Expelled
2011	4th	6	12	3	2	7	14	20	11			as SC Korosten
