= FC Dnistrovets Bilhorod-Dnistrovskyi =

Ukrainian amateur football club

FC Dnistrovets Bilhorod-Dnistrovskyi is a Ukrainian amateur football club from Bilhorod-Dnistrovskyi. It was formerly known as Tyras-2500 Bilhorod-Dnistrovskyi. It plays in the Vyscha League Odessa Region, and in the Odesa Oblast Championship (season 2019–20).

== League and cup history ==
Season	Div.	Pos.	Pl.	W	D	L	GS	GA	P	Domestic Cup	Europe	Notes
