= FC Keramik Baranivka =

Football team based in Baranivka, Ukraine

FC Keramik Baranivka is a football team based in a small city of Baranivka, Ukraine.

== History ==
It is one of the oldest clubs in Ukraine which represents the local porcelain factory. The factory fields its football team since 1930s. Until 1958 it carried the name Baranivskyi Farforovyi Zavod before changing to its current name. For short period of time, it was also used to be known as FC Baranivka.

In the beginning of 1990s, no one was better than Keramik among football teams of Zhytomyr Oblast.

== Honors ==
Ukrainian championship for collective teams of physical culture

- Group Runners-up (2): 1992–93, 1993–94

Zhytomyr Oblast football championship

- Winners (4): 1955, 1990, 1992, 1993
- Runners-up (1): 1991

Zhytomyr Oblast football cup

- Holders (1): 1992
- Finalists (2): 1998, 1999

== Coaches ==
- 1992–1993 Volodymyr Sus
- 1994–1995 Volodymyr Spiridonov
- 1995 Miletiy Balchos
- 1995–1996 Ihor Levytskyi
- 1998–2000 Oleksandr Drahan
