= 1992–93 in Ukrainian football =

Football in Ukraine
- Season: 1992–93

Men's football
- Vyshcha Liha: Dynamo Kyiv
- Persha Liha: Nyva Vinnytsia
- Druha Liha: Dnipro Cherkasy
- Perekhidna Liha: Naftokhimik Kremenchuk
- KFK Championship: Beskyd Nadvirna; Khutrovyk Tysmenytsia; Hart Borodianka; Sirius Zhovti Vody; Oskil Kupiansk; Surozh Sudak
- Ukrainian Cup: Dynamo Kyiv

Women's football
- Vyshcha Liha (1993): Arena Kyiv
- Persha Liha (1993): Stymul-ZDU Zaporizhzhia
- Ukrainian Cup (1993): Arena Kyiv

The 1992–93 season was the second season of competitive football in Ukraine.

== National team ==
=== Ukraine national football team ===
Ukraine finished their first year of international competition with a loss versus Hungary and a draw in Belarus. The side's first ever victory came in May of the following year with a win away at Lithuania.

==== Friendlies ====
26 August 1992
friendly match

Hungary	2 – 1	Ukraine
Kovács 82'; Nagy 89'		Hudymenko 35'

Városi Stadion, Nyíregyháza
Attendance: 8,000
Referee: Schtreng (ROM)

28 October 1992
friendly match

Belarus	1 – 1	Ukraine
Gotsmanov 49'		Maksymov 79'

Dinamo Stadium, Minsk
Attendance: 15,000
Referee: Spirin (RUS)

27 April 1993
friendly match

Ukraine	1 – 1	Israel
Konovalov 78'		Harazi 55'

Chornomorets, Odesa
Attendance: ?
Referee: Levnikov (RUS)

18 May 1993
friendly match

Lithuania	1 – 2	Ukraine
Zdančius 4'		Leonenko 18'; Mykhaylenko 22'

Žalgiris Stadium, Vilnius
Attendance: 1,200
Referee: Dubinskas (LTU)

25 June 1993
friendly match

Croatia	3 – 1	Ukraine
Šuker 13'; Adžić 47'; Bičanić 73'		Husin 57'

Maksimir Stadium, Zagreb
Attendance: 25,000
Referee: Jamsek (SLO)

== UEFA Competitions ==
=== UEFA Champions League ===
After finishing at the top of the Premier League table during the previous season, Tavriya Simferopol entered the qualifying stages of the first season of the rebranded UEFA Champions League. They were the first club to represent Ukraine on the European stage, progressed in the Preliminary round by defeating Irish champions Shelbourne on aggregate and eventually lost to Swiss side Sion on aggregate in the First round.

==== Preliminary round ====
Team 1	Agg.	Team 2	1st leg	2nd leg
Shelbourne (Republic of Ireland)	1–2	(Ukraine) Tavriya Simferopol	0–0	1–2

19 August 1992 Preliminary round	Shelbourne (Republic of Ireland)	0–0	(Ukraine) Tavriya Simferopol	Dublin, Ireland
18:30 UTC+1		Report		Stadium: Tolka Park; Attendance: 3,500; Referee: Anders Frisk (Sweden)

2 September 1992 Preliminary round	Tavriya Simferopol (Ukraine)	2–1	(Republic of Ireland) Shelbourne	Simferopol, Ukraine
19:00 UTC+1	Shevchenko 10'; Sheykhametov 15'	Report	Dully 42'	Stadium: Lokomotyv Stadium; Attendance: 10,500; Referee: Gerd Grabher (Switzerland)

==== First round ====
Team 1	Agg.	Team 2	1st leg	2nd leg
Sion (Switzerland)	7–2	(Ukraine) Tavriya Simferopol	4–1	3–1

16 September 1992 First round	Sion (Switzerland)	4–1	(Ukraine) Tavriya Simferopol	Sion, Switzerland
20:00	Hottiger 18'; Túlio 35', 74'; Roberto Assis 78'	Report	Shevchenko 85' (pen.)	Stadium: Stade Tourbillon; Attendance: 5,500; Referee: Léon Schelings (Belgium)

30 September 1992 First round	Tavriya Simferopol (Ukraine)	1–3	(Switzerland) Sion	Simferopol, Ukraine
19:00	Shevchenko 69' (pen.)	Report	Túlio 67', 77'; Herr 89'	Stadium: Lokomotyv Stadium; Attendance: 9,600; Referee: Christer Fällström (Sweden)

=== Cup Winners' Cup ===
Chornomorets Odesa, winners of the previous season's Cup, started in the Qualifying round of the UEFA Cup Winners' Cup with progressing against FC Vaduz, winning in both legs with aggregate 12–1, and lost in the First round to Greece representative Olympiacos with winning 1–0 away and losing 0–3 at home.

==== Qualifying round ====
Team 1	Agg.	Team 2	1st leg	2nd leg
Vaduz (Liechtenstein)	1–12	(Ukraine) Chornomorets Odesa	0–5	1–7

19 August 1992 Qualifying round	Vaduz (Liechtenstein)	0–5	(Ukraine) Chornomorets Odesa	Vaduz, Liechtenstein
18:30		Report	Tsymbalar 44'; Lebed 47'; Sak 53'; Husyev 81', 82'	Stadium: Gemeindesportplatz; Attendance: 1,650; Referee: Erny Kesseler (Luxembourg)

2 September 1992 Qualifying round	Chornomorets Odesa (Ukraine)	7–1	(Liechtenstein) Vaduz	Odesa, Ukraine
19:00	Nikiforov 9', 49' (pen.), 78', 90'; Yablonskyi 23'; Tsymbalar 27'; Lebed 77'	Report	Stöber 87'	Stadium: Central Stadium of ChMP; Attendance: 4,600; Referee: Jozef Marko (Czechoslovakia)

==== First round ====
Team 1	Agg.	Team 2	1st leg	2nd leg
Olympiacos (Greece)	3–1	(Ukraine) Chornomorets Odesa	0–1	3–0

17 September 1992 First round	Olympiacos (Greece)	0–1	(Ukraine) Chornomorets Odesa	Piraeus, Greece
21:30		Report	Sak 4'	Stadium: Karaiskakis Stadium; Attendance: 25,000; Referee: Brian Hill (England)

30 September 1992 First round	Chornomorets Odesa (Ukraine)	0–3	(Greece) Olympiacos	Odesa, Ukraine
19:00		Report	Vaitsis 15'; Lytovchenko 27'; Protasov 80'	Stadium: Central Stadium of ChMP; Attendance: 22,500; Referee: Gianni Beschin (Italy)

=== UEFA Cup ===
Dynamo Kyiv represented Ukraine in the UEFA Cup for the first time as runners-up of the previous Vyshcha Liha season, where they started in the First round with eliminating Rapid Wien on away goals and reached the second round before losing decidedly to Belgian side R.S.C. Anderlecht.

==== First round ====
Team 1	Agg.	Team 2	1st leg	2nd leg
Dynamo Kyiv (Ukraine)	3–3 (a)	(Austria) Rapid Wien	1–0	2–3

16 September 1992 First round	Dynamo Kyiv (Ukraine)	1–0	(Austria) Rapid Wien	Kyiv, Ukraine
19:00	Yakovenko 46'	Report		Stadium: Republican Stadium; Attendance: 18,000; Referee: Antonio Martin Navarrete (Spain)

30 September 1992 First round	Rapid Wien (Austria)	3–2	(Ukraine) Dynamo Kyiv	Vienna, Austria
20:35	Mandreko 8'; Fjørtoft 16', 38'	Report	Leonenko 44' (pen.) 87'	Stadium: Gerhard Hanappi Stadium; Attendance: 16,000; Referee: Piero Ceccarini (Italy)

==== Second round ====
Team 1	Agg.	Team 2	1st leg	2nd leg
Anderlecht (Belgium)	7–2	(Ukraine) Dynamo Kyiv	4–2	3–0

21 October 1992 Second round	Anderlecht (Belgium)	4–2	(Ukraine) Dynamo Kyiv	Brussels, Belgium
20:45	Nilis 23'; Degryse 38'; Versavel 51'; Van Vossen 59'	Report	Shkapenko 20'; Leonenko 54'	Stadium: Constant Vanden Stock Stadium; Attendance: 15,000; Referee: Frederick McKnight (Northern Ireland)

4 November 1992 Second round	Dynamo Kyiv (Ukraine)	0–3	(Belgium) Anderlecht	Kyiv, Ukraine
19:00		Report	Van Vossen 21'; Nilis 61', 69'	Stadium: Republican Stadium; Attendance: 40,000; Referee: Rune Pedersen (Norway)

== Men's club football ==
Pre-season promotion and relegation

League	Promoted to league	Relegated from league
Higher League	Veres Rivne; Kryvbas Kryvyi Rih	Nyva Vinnytsia; Naftovyk Okhtyrka; Prykarpattia Ivano-Frankivsk; Evis Mykolaiv; Temp Shepetivka; SC Odesa
First League	None	Azovets Mariupol; Vahonobudivnyk Stakhanov; Halychyna Drohobych; Dnipro Cherkasy; SKA Kyiv; Krystal Kherson; Polissya Zhytomyr; Chaika Sevastopol; Chornomorets-2 Odesa; Shakhtar-2 Donetsk
Second League	None	Andezyt Khust; Olympik Kharkiv; Elektron Romny; Lysonia Berezhany; Promin Sambir Raion; Prometei Shakhtarsk; Okean Kerch; Hirnyk Khartsyzk; Antratsyt Kirovske; More Feodosia
Transitional League	Avanhard Zhydachiv; Dynamo Luhansk; Frunzenets Saky; Naftokhimik Kremenchuk; Nyva Myronivka/Borysfen Boryspil; Prometei Dniprodzerzhynsk; Shakhtar Horlivka; Torpedo Melitopol	None (new tier)

Note: For all scratched clubs, see section Clubs removed for more details

=== Vyshcha Liha (Top League) ===
Pos	Team	Pld	W	D	L	GF	GA	GD	Pts	Qualification
1	Dynamo Kyiv (Note: Participant of the 1993 Ukrainian Cup Final) (C)	30	18	8	4	59	14	+45	44	Qualification to Champions League first round
2	Dnipro Dnipropetrovsk	30	18	8	4	51	20	+31	44	Qualification to UEFA Cup first round
3	Chornomorets Odesa	30	17	4	9	43	31	+12	38	
4	Shakhtar Donetsk	30	11	12	7	44	32	+12	34	
5	Metalist Kharkiv	30	12	7	11	37	34	+3	31	
6	Karpaty Lviv	30	10	10	10	37	38	−1	30	Qualification to Cup Winners' Cup qualifying round
7	Metalurh Zaporizhzhia	30	10	9	11	38	35	+3	29	
8	Kryvbas Kryvyi Rih	30	8	11	11	27	40	−13	27	
9	Kremin Kremenchuk	30	8	11	11	23	40	−17	27	
10	Tavriya Simferopol	30	11	4	15	30	39	−9	26	
11	Volyn Lutsk	30	10	6	14	37	54	−17	26	
12	Bukovyna Chernivtsi	30	9	8	13	27	32	−5	26	
13	Torpedo Zaporizhzhia	30	9	7	14	32	40	−8	25	
14	Nyva Ternopil	30	8	9	13	22	25	−3	25	
15	Zorya-MALS Luhansk	30	10	4	16	26	46	−20	24	
16	Veres Rivne	30	9	6	15	29	42	−13	24	

Source: uafootball.net.ua
Rules for classification: 1) Points; 2) Matches won; 3) Goal difference; 4) Goals scored; 5) Head-to-head points; 6) Head-to-head matches won; 7) Head-to-head goal difference; 8) Head-to-head goals scored.
(C) Champions

=== Persha Liha (First League) ===
Pos	Team	Pld	W	D	L	GF	GA	GD	Pts	Promotion or relegation
1	Nyva Vinnytsia (C, P)	42	24	14	4	73	26	+47	62	Promoted to Vyshcha Liha
2	Temp Shepetivka (P)	42	25	8	9	68	48	+20	58	Promoted to Vyshcha Liha
3	Naftovyk Okhtyrka	42	22	10	10	73	41	+32	54	
4	Vorskla Poltava	42	21	9	12	57	46	+11	51	
5	Prykarpattia Ivano-Frankivsk	42	18	14	10	53	35	+18	50	
6	Polihraftekhnika Oleksandria	42	19	10	13	69	39	+30	48	
7	Evis Mykolaiv	42	18	11	13	60	39	+21	47	
8	Nord-Am-Podillia Khmelnytskyi	42	15	16	11	45	39	+6	46	
9	Khimik Siverodonetsk	42	17	9	16	66	65	+1	43	
10	Stal Alchevsk	42	16	10	16	40	37	+3	42	
11	Skala Stryi	42	15	11	16	49	58	−9	41	
12	SC Odesa	42	15	10	17	54	61	−7	40	
13	Metalurh Nikopol	42	13	14	15	43	50	−7	40	
14	Krystal Chortkiv	42	14	9	19	37	61	−24	37	
15	Dynamo-2 Kyiv	42	10	17	15	48	39	+9	37	
16	Zakarpattia Uzhhorod	42	13	10	19	45	56	−11	36	
17	Avtomobilist Sumy	42	13	10	19	39	61	−22	36	
18	Artania Ochakiv	42	15	5	22	42	73	−31	35	
19	Desna Chernihiv	42	13	9	20	42	49	−7	35	
20	Pryladyst Mukacheve	42	12	11	19	38	53	−15	35	
21	Ros Bila Tserkva (R)	42	10	15	17	40	48	−8	35	Relegated to Second League
22	Shakhtar Pavlohrad (R)	42	6	4	32	35	92	−57	16	Relegated to Second League

Source: uafootball.net.ua
(C) Champions; (P) Promoted; (R) Relegated

=== Druha Liha (Second League) ===
Pos	Team	Pld	W	D	L	GF	GA	GD	Pts	Promotion or relegation
1	Dnipro Cherkasy (C, P)	34	20	9	5	59	33	+26	49	Promoted to First League
2	Khimik Zhytomyr (P)	34	20	9	5	53	29	+24	49	Promoted to First League
3	Yavir Krasnopillia	34	17	7	10	42	27	+15	41	
4	Zirka Kirovohrad	34	16	9	9	50	33	+17	41	
5	Meliorator Kakhovka	34	16	9	9	45	37	+8	41	
6	Chaika Sevastopol	34	13	10	11	57	45	+12	36	
7	Hazovyk Komarne	34	13	8	13	37	47	−10	34	
8	Bazhanovets Makiivka	34	11	11	12	38	45	−7	33	
9	Halychyna Drohobych	34	13	6	15	42	40	+2	32	
10	Tavriya Kherson	34	12	8	14	33	29	+4	32	
11	Shakhtar-2 Donetsk	34	10	12	12	33	30	+3	32	
12	Vahonobudivnyk Stakhanov	34	11	8	15	39	34	+5	30	
13	Azovets Mariupol	34	9	11	14	34	47	−13	29	
14	Druzhba Berdiansk	34	8	12	14	30	49	−19	28	
15	Dnister Zalischyky	34	11	5	18	30	45	−15	27	
16	Chornomorets-2 Odesa	34	8	11	15	36	43	−7	27	
17	Tytan Armyansk	34	10	6	18	42	54	−12	26	
18	CSK ZSU Kyiv (R)	34	9	7	18	27	50	−23	25	Relegated to Third League

Source: uafootball.net.ua
(C) Champions; (P) Promoted; (R) Relegated

=== Perekhidna Liha (Transitional League) ===
Pos	Team	Pld	W	D	L	GF	GA	GD	Pts	Promotion or relegation
1	Naftokhimik Kremenchuk (Note: Promoted from the amateurs)	34	21	10	3	56	26	+30	52	Promoted to Second League
2	Dynamo Luhansk	34	19	12	3	65	32	+33	50	Promoted to Second League
3	Antratsyt Kirovske (Note: Demoted from the Second League)	34	22	5	7	46	32	+14	49	Withdrew
4	Nyva-Borysfen Myronivka	34	19	7	8	45	28	+17	45	Promoted to Second League
5	Voykovets Kerch	34	17	8	9	47	32	+15	42	Promoted to Second League
6	Prometei Shakhtarsk	34	12	16	6	43	21	+22	40	Promoted to Second League
7	Frunzenets Saky rayon	34	13	11	10	48	29	+19	37	
8	Avanhard Zhydachiv	34	13	10	11	41	32	+9	36	
9	Elektron Romny	34	12	10	12	37	36	+1	34	
10	Promin Volia Baranetska	34	14	4	16	46	43	+3	32	
11	Torpedo Melitopol	34	12	6	16	39	41	−2	30	
12	Fetrovyk Khust	34	13	2	19	29	35	−6	28	Excluded / Later reinstated
13	Shakhtar Horlivka	34	9	8	17	33	44	−11	26	Relegated to amateur leagues
14	Olympik Kharkiv	34	7	10	17	35	56	−21	24	Relegated to amateur leagues
15	Silur Khartsyzk	34	8	7	19	25	54	−29	23	Avoided relegation
16	Lysonia Berezhany	34	7	9	18	20	53	−33	23	Relegated to amateur leagues
17	More Feodosia	34	7	8	19	19	39	−20	22	Relegated to amateur leagues
18	Prometei Dniprodzerzhynsk	34	4	9	21	26	68	−42	17	Relegated to amateur leagues

=== Ukrainian Cup ===
Round of 32
Polihraftekhnika	1	0	1
Metalist Kharkiv	2	5	7
Temp Shepetivka	2	3	5(a)
Bukovyna Chernivtsi	1	4	5
Lokomotyv Rivne	0	1	1
Nyva Ternopil	0	2	2
Hazovyk Komarne	2	-	-
Dnipro	3	+	+
Sokil-LORTA Lviv	0	0	0
Dynamo Kyiv	7	3	10
Prykarpattia	x	x	+
Kryvbas Kryvyi Rih	x	x	-
Khimik Zhytomyr	1	1	2
Volyn Lutsk	1	3	4
Nyva Vinnytsia	2	0	2
Zorya-MALS	1	2	3
Naftovyk Okhtyrka	1	0	1
Torpedo Zaporizhzhia	0	2	2
Dynamo-2 Kyiv	2	1	3
Veres Rivne	2	1	3(a)
Khimik Sieverodonetsk	4	1	5
Shakhtar Donetsk	3	1	4
Yavir Krasnopilya	0	1	1
Kremin Kremenchuk	3	2	5
Shakhtar-2 Donetsk	0	2	2
Metalurh Zaporizhya	0	5	5
Shakhtar Pavlohrad	1	0	1
Tavriya Simferopol	1	3	4
Odesa	0	3	3(a)
Chornomorets Odesa	1	2	3
Evis Mykolaiv	1	0	1
Karpaty Lviv	0	3	3

Round of 16
Metalist Kharkiv	1	0	1
Temp Shepetivka	0	0	0
Nyva Ternopil	3	0	3
Dnipro	0	2	2
Prykarpattia	0	1	1
Dynamo Kyiv	2	4	6
Zorya-MALS	3	0	3
Volyn Lutsk	0	5	5
Torpedo Zaporizhzhia	3	1	4
Veres Rivne	1	2	3
Kremin Kremenchuk	2	0	2
Khimik Sieverodonetsk	1	1	2(a)
Tavriya Simferopol	1	0	1
Metalurh Zaporizhya	1	3	4
Odesa	0	2	2
Karpaty Lviv	0	3	3

Quarter-finals
Metalist Kharkiv	1	1	2(a)
Nyva Ternopil	0	2	2
Dynamo Kyiv	5	2	7
Volyn Lutsk	1	2	3
Khimik Sieverodonetsk	0	0	0
Torpedo Zaporizhzhia	0	1	1
Metalurh Zaporizhya	0	1	1
Karpaty Lviv	1	2	3

Semi-finals
Metalist Kharkiv	1	0	1
Dynamo Kyiv	1	3	4
Torpedo Zaporizhzhia	0	1	1
Karpaty Lviv	1	2	3

Final
Dynamo Kyiv	2
Karpaty Lviv	1

==== Final ====
30 May 1993
?:?

Dynamo Kyiv (PL)	2–1	(PL) Karpaty Lviv
Leonenko 23'; Topchiyev 64'	Report	Plotko 89' (pen.)

Republican Stadium, Kyiv
Attendance: 47,000
Referee: Volodymyr Pyanykh (Donetsk)
