= 1989 KFK competitions (Ukraine) =

KFK competitions
- Season: 1989
- Champions: SKA Kyiv

The 1989 KFK competitions in Ukraine were part of the 1989 Soviet KFK competitions that were conducted in the Soviet Union. It was 25th season of the KFK in Ukraine since its introduction in 1964. The winner eventually qualified to the 1990 Soviet Second League B.

== Group 1 ==
Pos	Team	Pld	W	D	L	GF	GA	GD	Pts	Qualification
1	Tsukrovyk Chortkiv (Q)	22	16	3	3	33	13	+20	35	Final pool
2	Nyva Berezhany	22	15	4	3	37	13	+24	34	
3	Spartak Sambir	22	14	2	6	28	22	+6	30	
4	Pidshypnyk Lutsk	22	10	6	6	36	22	+14	26	
5	Kooperator Khust	22	10	5	7	41	28	+13	25	
6	Hranit Sharhorod	22	10	4	8	27	31	−4	24	
7	Prohres Berdychiv	22	9	4	9	29	24	+5	22	
8	Avanhard Zhydachiv	22	7	4	11	25	30	−5	18	
9	Burevisnyk Kamianets-Podilskyi	22	4	8	10	21	30	−9	16	
10	Refryzherator Fastiv	22	5	5	12	22	29	−7	15	
11	Karpaty Chernivtsi	22	4	2	16	22	52	−30	10	
12	Bystrytsia Nadvirna	22	2	5	15	20	38	−18	9	

Source: ukr-footbal.org.ua
(Q) Qualified for the phase indicated

== Group 2 ==
Pos	Team	Pld	W	D	L	GF	GA	GD	Pts	Qualification
1	Pryladyst Mukacheve (Q)	24	18	4	2	49	15	+34	40	Final pool
2	Karpaty Kamianka-Buzka	24	15	6	3	45	19	+26	36	
3	Naftovyk Dolyna	24	14	5	5	38	20	+18	33	
4	Mashynobudivnyk Borodianka	24	11	7	6	32	32	0	29	
5	Kolos Holyn	24	10	5	9	36	28	+8	25	
6	Iskra Teofipol	24	10	5	9	35	35	0	25	
7	Sluch Berezne	24	10	4	10	30	26	+4	24	
8	Nyva Myronivka	24	5	9	10	22	30	−8	19	
9	Sokil Haisyn	24	6	6	12	22	36	−14	18	
10	Avtomobilist Lviv	24	6	5	13	14	28	−14	17	
11	Zirka Chudniv	24	5	6	13	19	36	−17	16	
12	Khimmash Korosten	24	5	6	13	23	42	−19	16	
13	Isotop Kuznetsovsk	24	3	8	13	20	39	−19	14	

Source: ukr-footbal.org.ua
(Q) Qualified for the phase indicated

== Group 3 ==
Pos	Team	Pld	W	D	L	GF	GA	GD	Pts	Qualification
1	SKA Kiev (Q)	24	18	4	2	56	15	+41	40	Final pool
2	Khimik Severodonetsk	24	13	9	2	34	14	+20	35	
3	Metalurh Kupyansk	24	12	8	4	37	22	+15	32	
4	Vostok Kiev	24	9	10	5	28	18	+10	28	
5	Elektron Romny	24	9	7	8	34	29	+5	25	
6	Rotor Cherkasy	24	9	7	8	40	46	−6	25	
7	Shakhtar Sverdlovsk	24	9	5	10	32	32	0	23	
8	Trud Karlivka	24	8	6	10	31	31	0	22	
9	Naftovyk Kremenchuk	24	7	8	9	33	34	−1	22	
10	Hidrotekhnik Chernihiv	24	5	9	10	26	40	−14	19	
11	Frehat Pervomaisk	24	6	5	13	29	38	−9	17	
12	Tiasmyn Smila	24	4	7	13	21	44	−23	15	
13	Khimik Kirovohrad	24	3	3	18	8	49	−41	9	

Source: ukr-footbal.org.ua
(Q) Qualified for the phase indicated

== Group 4 ==
Pos	Team	Pld	W	D	L	GF	GA	GD	Pts	Qualification
1	Sula Lubny (Q)	24	19	3	2	59	17	+42	41	Final pool
2	Shakhtar Oleksandria	24	16	3	5	47	19	+28	35	
3	Stal Komunarsk	24	13	8	3	47	22	+25	34	
4	Khimik Bezdryk	24	16	1	7	45	23	+22	33	
5	Pivdenstal Yenakiyeve	24	13	4	7	37	26	+11	30	
6	Avanhard Lozova	24	12	3	9	35	25	+10	27	
7	Yavir Krasnopillia	24	9	9	6	32	20	+12	27	
8	Khliborob Chornobai	24	9	2	13	34	35	−1	20	
9	Naftovyk Pyriatyn	24	7	5	12	20	36	−16	19	
10	Shakhtar Dzerzhynsk	24	8	1	15	32	48	−16	17	
11	Kolos Chervonohrad	24	7	3	14	23	45	−22	17	
12	Maiak Sumy	24	2	4	18	14	44	−30	8	
13	Bilshovyk Kyiv	24	1	2	21	13	74	−61	4	

Source: ukr-footbal.org.ua
(Q) Qualified for the phase indicated

== Group 5 ==
Pos	Team	Pld	W	D	L	GF	GA	GD	Pts	Qualification
1	Maiak Ochakiv (Q)	24	20	2	2	51	14	+37	42	Final pool
2	Dynamo Odesa	24	15	6	3	37	16	+21	36	
3	Meliorator Kakhovka	24	14	4	6	43	19	+24	32	
4	More Feodosia	24	13	5	6	30	15	+15	31	
5	Enerhiya Nova Kakhovka	24	10	11	3	32	19	+13	31	
6	Tytan Armyansk	24	9	6	9	29	21	+8	24	
7	Kolos Osokorivka	24	5	11	8	34	38	−4	21	
8	Sudnoremontnyk Illichivsk	24	9	2	13	35	28	+7	20	
9	SKCF Sevastopol	24	6	8	10	22	37	−15	20	
10	Vodnyk Mykolaiv	24	5	7	12	14	28	−14	17	
11	Olimpiets Prymorsk	24	5	7	12	25	45	−20	17	
12	Torpedo Melitopol	24	4	5	15	24	44	−20	13	
13	Dunaiets Izmail	24	2	4	18	14	46	−32	8	

Source: ukr-footbal.org.ua
(Q) Qualified for the phase indicated

== Group 6 ==
Pos	Team	Pld	W	D	L	GF	GA	GD	Pts	Qualification
1	Stakhanovets Stakhanov (Q)	24	20	3	1	68	13	+55	43	Final pool
2	Shakhtar Snizhne	24	20	3	1	55	9	+46	43	
3	Sotsdonbasivets Donetsk	24	13	5	6	44	34	+10	31	
4	Shakhtar Shakhtarsk	24	12	3	9	41	30	+11	27	
5	Shakhtar Horlivka	24	12	3	9	28	24	+4	27	
6	Shakhtar Lutuhine	24	10	6	8	27	24	+3	26	
7	Metalurh Dniprodzerzhynsk	24	9	7	8	34	32	+2	25	
8	Tsementnyk Balakleia	24	8	6	10	24	30	−6	22	
9	Hirnyk Pavlohrad	24	7	5	12	21	22	−1	19	
10	Bazhanovets Makiivka	24	7	4	13	19	38	−19	18	
11	Shakhtobudivnyk SBU-4	24	4	7	13	18	35	−17	15	
12	Olimpia Pokrovsk Raion	24	4	5	15	13	40	−27	13	
13	Enerhiya Berdiansk	17	0	3	14	13	48	−35	3	

Source: ukr-footbal.org.ua
(Q) Qualified for the phase indicated

== Final ==
Pos	Team	Pld	W	D	L	GF	GA	GD	Pts	Promotion
1	SKA Kiev	5	3	1	1	13	6	+7	7	Promoted to Second League B
2	Mayak Ochakiv	5	3	0	2	7	7	0	6	
3	Tsukrovyk Chortkiv	5	2	2	1	10	7	+3	6	
4	Stakhanovets Stakhanov	5	1	2	2	7	9	−2	4	
5	Sula Lubny	5	1	2	2	6	8	−2	4	
6	Pryladyst Mukacheve	5	0	3	2	7	13	−6	3	

Source: ukr-football.org.ua
