= 1990 KFK competitions (Ukraine) =

KFK competitions
- Season: 1990
- Champions: Avtomobilist Sumy

The 1990 KFK competitions in Ukraine were part of the 1990 Soviet KFK competitions that were conducted in the Soviet Union. It was 26th season of the KFK in Ukraine since its introduction in 1964. The winner eventually qualified to the 1991 Soviet Second League B.

== Group 1 ==
Pos	Team	Pld	W	D	L	GF	GA	GD	Pts	Qualification
1	Karpaty Kamianka-Buzka (Q)	28	24	1	3	57	12	+45	49	Final pool
2	Krystal Chortkiv	28	22	3	3	62	13	+49	47	
3	Spartak Sambir	28	17	6	5	41	18	+23	40	
4	Smotrych Kamianets-Podilskyi	28	13	9	6	32	31	+1	35	
5	Andezyt Khust	28	14	6	8	53	36	+17	34	
6	Halychyna Kalush	28	11	8	9	39	26	+13	30	
7	Pokuttia Kolomyia	28	12	5	11	33	35	−2	29	
8	Zorya Rivne	28	8	10	10	29	34	−5	26	
9	Hranit Sharhorod	28	9	5	14	27	49	−22	23	
10	Papirnyk Malyn	28	8	6	14	35	39	−4	22	
11	Iskra Teofipol	28	7	7	14	25	34	−9	21	
12	Khimik Zhytomyr	28	7	4	17	20	45	−25	18	
13	Blyskivka Baryshivka	28	3	10	15	20	43	−23	16	
14	Sokil Haisyn	28	5	5	18	16	49	−33	15	
15	Nyva Myronivka	28	3	9	16	15	40	−25	15	

Source: ukr-footbal.org.ua
(Q) Qualified for the phase indicated

Notes

- FC Druzhba Kyseliv withdrew after the first half, all its results were annulled.

== Group 2 ==
Pos	Team	Pld	W	D	L	GF	GA	GD	Pts	Qualification
1	Temp Shepetivka (Q)	30	24	4	2	69	20	+49	52	Final pool
2	Pryladyst Mukacheve	30	22	3	5	71	29	+42	47	
3	Nyva Berezhany	30	16	8	6	47	23	+24	40	
4	Pidshypnyk Lutsk	30	16	4	10	53	34	+19	36	
5	Kolos Zboriv	30	14	8	8	47	30	+17	36	
6	Naftovyk Dolyna	30	14	6	10	46	29	+17	34	
7	Keramik Baranivka	30	14	6	10	41	34	+7	34	
8	Hirnyk Novoyavorivsk	30	13	6	11	45	38	+7	32	
9	Shakhtar Chervonohrad	30	13	6	11	40	42	−2	32	
10	Prohres Berdychiv	30	13	5	12	43	41	+2	31	
11	Bofik Kaprylivka	30	10	4	16	33	56	−23	24	
12	Mashynobudivnyk Borodyanka	30	9	6	15	27	45	−18	24	
13	Enerhetyk Burshtyn	30	7	7	16	27	42	−15	21	
14	Sluch Berezne	30	6	5	19	33	49	−16	17	
15	Traktor Khmelnytskyi	30	5	3	22	25	64	−39	13	
16	Yatran Uman	30	1	5	24	26	97	−71	7	

Source: ukr-footbal.org.ua
(Q) Qualified for the phase indicated

== Group 3 ==
Pos	Team	Pld	W	D	L	GF	GA	GD	Pts	Qualification
1	Avtomobilist Sumy (Q)	30	20	7	3	57	21	+36	47	Final pool
2	Zorya Karlivka	30	19	6	5	54	27	+27	44	
3	Metalurh Kupyansk	30	18	8	4	42	17	+25	44	
4	Khimik Severodonetsk	30	16	11	3	49	21	+28	43	
5	Khliborob Chornobai	30	17	6	7	47	29	+18	40	
6	Podillya Kyrnasivka	30	15	9	6	60	29	+31	39	
7	Yavir Krasnopillya	30	14	9	7	48	34	+14	37	
8	Naftovyk Kremenchuk	30	14	8	8	36	28	+8	36	
9	Spartak Hlukhiv	30	12	5	13	33	32	+1	29	
10	Fakel Fastiv	30	9	6	15	36	48	−12	24	
11	Kolos Kirov Kolhosp	30	9	4	17	40	49	−9	22	
12	Rotor Cherkasy	30	9	3	18	40	49	−9	21	
13	Frehat Pervomaisk	30	8	5	17	29	49	−20	21	
14	Politekhnik Chernihiv	30	5	6	19	23	57	−34	16	
15	Radyst Kirovohrad	30	3	3	24	14	73	−59	9	
16	Bilshovyk Kyiv	30	2	4	24	21	66	−45	8	

Source: ukr-footbal.org.ua
(Q) Qualified for the phase indicated

== Group 4 ==
Pos	Team	Pld	W	D	L	GF	GA	GD	Pts	Qualification
1	Stal Komunarsk (Q)	30	23	5	2	69	17	+52	51	Final pool
2	Sula Lubny	30	22	5	3	61	15	+46	49	
3	Elektron Romny	30	19	3	8	48	30	+18	41	
4	Shakhtar Oleksandriya	30	17	6	7	53	23	+30	40	
5	Khimik Sumy	30	16	8	6	37	24	+13	40	
6	Antratsyt Kirovske	30	15	6	9	34	30	+4	36	
7	Shakhtar Dzerzhynsk	30	12	11	7	36	31	+5	35	
8	Vostok Kyiv	30	9	11	10	38	34	+4	29	
9	Temp Korsun-Shevchenkivskyi	30	11	6	13	23	31	−8	28	
10	Shakhtar Sverdlovsk	30	8	7	15	39	53	−14	23	
11	Kolos Osokorivka	30	8	6	16	30	43	−13	22	
12	Avanhard Lozova	30	7	8	15	42	46	−4	22	
13	Fakel Chervonohrad	30	8	5	17	29	43	−14	21	
14	Avanhard Ordzhonikidze	30	5	7	18	19	47	−28	17	
15	Naftovyk Pyriatyn	30	7	2	21	26	58	−32	16	
16	Tiasmyn Smila	30	0	5	25	27	84	−57	5	

Source: ukr-footbal.org.ua
(Q) Qualified for the phase indicated

== Group 5 ==
Pos	Team	Pld	W	D	L	GF	GA	GD	Pts	Qualification
1	Mayak Ochakiv (Q)	30	20	8	2	66	18	+48	48	Final pool
2	Meliorator Kakhovka	30	21	5	4	61	18	+43	47	
3	More Feodosia	30	20	7	3	43	12	+31	47	
4	Vodnyk Illichivsk	30	16	5	9	36	12	+24	37	
5	Frunzenets Saky	30	13	11	6	44	25	+19	37	
6	Tavria Novotroitske	30	15	6	9	38	32	+6	36	
7	Dynamo Odessa	30	13	7	10	29	29	0	33	
8	Tytan Armyansk	30	13	5	12	39	24	+15	31	
9	Enerhiya Nova Kakhovka	30	11	7	12	33	31	+2	29	
10	SKChF Sevastopol	30	10	3	17	35	43	−8	23	
11	Olimpiyets Prymorsk	30	9	5	16	38	51	−13	23	
12	Torpedo Melitopol	30	8	6	16	21	45	−24	22	
13	Torpedo Berdyansk	30	6	9	15	15	32	−17	21	
14	Transformator Zaporizhia	30	6	8	16	26	48	−22	20	
15	Olimpiya Pokrovske	30	5	5	20	25	67	−42	15	
16	Vodnyk Mykolaiv	30	2	7	21	11	53	−42	11	

Source: ukr-footbal.org.ua
(Q) Qualified for the phase indicated

== Group 6 ==
Pos	Team	Pld	W	D	L	GF	GA	GD	Pts	Qualification
1	Stakhanovets Stakhanov (Q)	28	20	7	1	66	19	+47	47	Final pool
2	Prometei Shakhtarsk	28	18	6	4	52	27	+25	42	
3	Sotsdonbasivets Donetsk	28	17	5	6	44	22	+22	39	
4	Shakhtar Snizhne	28	16	7	5	52	32	+20	39	
5	Novator Mariupol	28	15	6	7	55	25	+30	36	
6	Sokil Rovenky	28	11	8	9	39	40	−1	30	
7	Shakhtar Horlivka	28	11	7	10	30	23	+7	29	
8	Pivdenstal Yenakieve	28	8	11	9	26	31	−5	27	
9	Radyst Dniprodzerzhynsk	28	7	11	10	36	50	−14	25	
10	Hirnyk Pavlohrad	28	8	8	12	29	46	−17	24	
11	Shakhtar Lutuhyne	28	9	5	14	25	39	−14	23	
12	Mashynobudivnyk Druzhkivka	28	5	8	15	20	38	−18	18	
13	Avanhard Zhovti Vody	28	7	3	18	24	43	−19	17	
14	Tsementnyk Balakliya	28	3	9	16	24	46	−22	15	
15	Kirovets Makiivka	28	1	7	20	20	61	−41	9	

Source: ukr-footbal.org.ua
(Q) Qualified for the phase indicated

== Final ==
Pos	Team	Pld	W	D	L	GF	GA	GD	Pts	Promotion
1	Ahrotekhservis Sumy	5	3	2	0	10	4	+6	8	Promoted to Second League B
2	Mayak Ochakiv	5	3	0	2	7	5	+2	6	Promoted to Second League B
3	Stal Komunarsk	5	2	2	1	10	6	+4	6	Promoted to Second League B
4	Temp Shepetivka	5	2	1	2	7	8	−1	5	Promoted to Second League B
5	Stakhanovets Stakhanov	5	1	1	3	5	8	−3	3	Promoted to Second League B
6	Karpaty Kamianka-Buzka	5	1	0	4	3	11	−8	2	Promoted to Second League B

Source: ukr-football.org.ua
