= 1992–93 Ukrainian Transitional League =

Ukrainian Transitional League
- Season: 1992–93
- Dates: 15 August 1992 – 3 July 1993
- Champions: Naftokhimik Kremenchuk
- Promoted: Naftokhimik Kremenchuk; Dynamo Luhansk; Nyva-Borysfen Myronivka; Voikovetsk Kerch; Prometei Shakhtarsk
- Relegated: Shakhtar Horlivka; Olympik Kharkiv; Lysonia Berezhany; More Feodosia; Prometei Dniprodzerzhynsk
- Top goalscorer: 16 – Z.Selimov (Frunzenets)
- Biggest home win: Dynamo - Prometei Dz 7:0 (Round 32)
- Biggest away win: Kanatnyk - Frunzenets 1:6 (Round 7)
- Highest scoring: Voikovets - Prometei Dz 7:1 (Round 30); Dynamo - Torpedo 6:2 (Round 13)

The 1992–93 Ukrainian Transitional League season was the first season of the fourth tier which existed for the next three years. The League was organized after the split of the 1992 Transfer League into the Second League and the Transitional League.

A total of eighteen teams participated in the competition, ten of which contested the 1992 season in the Ukrainian Second League and the remaining eight were promoted from the KFK competition (Amateurs). The competition began on August 15, 1992, with eight games. After the 17th round (November 17, 1992) the competition was retired for a winter break until April 3, 1993. The competition concluded on July 3, 1993.

== Teams ==
=== Location ===
Locations of team home grounds in Ukrainian Third League 1992–93

=== Stadiums and managers ===
Team	Location	Venue	League and position in 1992		Coach	Replaced coach
Fetrovyk	Khust	Avanhard Stadium	1992 Ukrainian Transitional League (Group A)	A.5	(Ukraine) Karlo Soikov	
Olympik	Kharkiv	KhTZ Stadium	1992 Ukrainian Transitional League (Group A)	A.6	(Ukraine) Mykola Koltsov	
Elektron	Romny	Elektron Stadium	1992 Ukrainian Transitional League (Group A)	A.7	(Ukraine) Oleksandr Kvasha	
Lysonia	Berezhany	Nyva Stadium	1992 Ukrainian Transitional League (Group A)	A.8	(Ukraine) Yaroslav Pavlyskyi	
Promin Volia Baranetska	Sambir Raion	Kolos Stadium	1992 Ukrainian Transitional League (Group A)	A.9	(Ukraine) Yaroslav Khomyn	
Prometei S.	Shakhtarsk	Shakhtar Stadium	1992 Ukrainian Transitional League (Group B)	B.5	(Ukraine) Yuriy Vankevych	(Ukraine) Anatoliy Poliakov
Voikovets	Kerch	50ty-richia Zhovtnia Stadium	1992 Ukrainian Transitional League (Group B)	B.6	(Russia) Aleksei Yakimovich	
Silur	Khartsyzk	Stalekanatchyk Stadium	1992 Ukrainian Transitional League (Group B)	B.7	(Ukraine) Mykhaylo Sokolovsky	(Ukraine) Oleksandr Sliusarenko
Antratsyt	Kirovske	Yuvileiny Stadium	1992 Ukrainian Transitional League (Group B)	B.8	(Ukraine) Oleksiy Varnavskiy	(Ukraine) Anatoliy Molotai
More	Feodosiya	Albatross Stadium	1992 Ukrainian Transitional League (Group B)	B.9	(Russia) Yuriy Naurzokov	
Avanhard	Zhydachiv	Avanhard	uncertain origin		(Ukraine) Valentyn Khodukin	
Dynamo	Luhansk	Avanhard Stadium	uncertain origin		(Ukraine) Yuriy Pohrebniak	
Borysfen	Boryspil	Kolos Stadium	uncertain origin		during season merged w/Nyva Myronivka	
Frunzenets	Saky	Kolos Stadium	1991 Ukrainian KFK competitions		(Ukraine) Mamed Isayev (Note: Isayev was born in a family of deported Chechen people. He was a head coach and president of Frunzenets. In 1995 he was killed in Crimea.)	
Naftokhimik	Kremenchuk	Naftokhimik Stadium	1991 Ukrainian KFK competitions		(Ukraine) Mykhailo Byelykh	
Nyva	Myronivka	Nyva Stadium	1991 Ukrainian KFK competitions		(Ukraine) Volodymyr Kolomiets	
Prometei D.	Dniprodzerzhynsk	Peremoha Stadium	1991 Ukrainian KFK competitions		(Ukraine) Volordymyr Derun	
Shakhtar	Horlivka	Stadium of Kalinin Mine	1991 Ukrainian KFK competitions		(Ukraine) Volodymyr Nepomnyashchyi	
Torpedo	Melitopol	Avanhard Stadium	1991 Ukrainian KFK competitions		(Ukraine) Yuriy Rozenko	

=== Renamed teams ===
- Prior to the season Andezyt Khust changed its name to Fetrovyk Khust
- Prior to the season Hirnyk Khartsyzk changed its name to Kanatchyk Khartsyzk and later to Silur Khartsyzk
- During the season Nyva Myronivka changed its name to Nyva-Borysfen Myronivka
- During the season Okean Kerch changed its name to Voykovets Kerch
- During the season Sokil Berezhany changed its name to Lysonia Berezhany
- During the season Hirnyk Hirne changed its name to Antratsyt Kirovske

=== Change of stadiums ===
- Nyva since May 15, 1993, played its games in Kyiv at the CSKA Stadium
- Promin in the second half played its games in Rudky at the Motor Stadiuim and Kolos Stadium.
- More played all its games in Prymorskyi
- Naftokhimik played several games at the Lokomotyv Stadium in Komsomolsk and Dnipro Stadium in Kremenchuk
- Prometei Dz played several games at the Burevisnyk Stadium
- Prometei Sh played several games at the Olimp Stadium
- Lysonia played some of its games at the Sokil Stadium
- Olimpik played several games at the Serp i Molot Stadium
- Avanhard Stadium in Khust changed its name to Fetrovyk
- The game against Avanhard, Prometei Sh played in Torez at the Komsomolets Stadium
- The game against Nyva, Promin played in Staryi Sambir at the Prykarpattia Stadium, against Avanhard - in Rudky at the Motor Stadium
- The game against Dynamo, Antratsyt played in Hirne at the Hirnyk Stadium, against Torpedo in Zuhres at the ZMS Stadium
- The game against Torpedo, Naftokhimik played at the Dormash Stadium, against Prometei Sh - Syntez Stadium, against Olimpik - in Komsomolsk at the Lokomotyv Stadium
- The game against More, Elektron played in Sumy at the Krystal Stadium
- The game against Torpedo, Lysonia played at the Sokil Stadium

== Final standings ==
Pos	Team	Pld	W	D	L	GF	GA	GD	Pts	Promotion or relegation
1	Naftokhimik Kremenchuk (Note: Promoted from the amateurs)	34	21	10	3	56	26	+30	52	Promoted to Second League
2	Dynamo Luhansk	34	19	12	3	65	32	+33	50	Promoted to Second League
3	Antratsyt Kirovske (Note: Demoted from the Second League)	34	22	5	7	46	32	+14	49	Withdrew
4	Nyva-Borysfen Myronivka	34	19	7	8	45	28	+17	45	Promoted to Second League
5	Voykovets Kerch	34	17	8	9	47	32	+15	42	Promoted to Second League
6	Prometei Shakhtarsk	34	12	16	6	43	21	+22	40	Promoted to Second League
7	Frunzenets Saky rayon	34	13	11	10	48	29	+19	37	
8	Avanhard Zhydachiv	34	13	10	11	41	32	+9	36	
9	Elektron Romny	34	12	10	12	37	36	+1	34	
10	Promin Volia Baranetska	34	14	4	16	46	43	+3	32	
11	Torpedo Melitopol	34	12	6	16	39	41	−2	30	
12	Fetrovyk Khust	34	13	2	19	29	35	−6	28	Excluded / Later reinstated
13	Shakhtar Horlivka	34	9	8	17	33	44	−11	26	Relegated to amateur leagues
14	Olympik Kharkiv	34	7	10	17	35	56	−21	24	Relegated to amateur leagues
15	Silur Khartsyzk	34	8	7	19	25	54	−29	23	Avoided relegation
16	Lysonia Berezhany	34	7	9	18	20	53	−33	23	Relegated to amateur leagues
17	More Feodosia	34	7	8	19	19	39	−20	22	Relegated to amateur leagues
18	Prometei Dniprodzerzhynsk	34	4	9	21	26	68	−42	17	Relegated to amateur leagues

=== Volodymyr Suprunenko case ===
FC Silur Khartsyzk had several games changed into a technical loss (-:+) as the club used a player from Shakhtar Horlivka (Suprunenko). Several opponents of Silur Khartsyzk received a technical victory (+:-) (Antratsyt - Round 18 on April 3, Shakhtar - Round 22 on April 24)

=== Fetrovyk scandal ===
On May 22, 1993 Fetrovyk Khust did not arrive for the game of the Round 27 with Prometei Shakhtarsk and it was awarded a technical loss (-:+). On June 5, 1993, during the game of the Round 29 against Frunzenets Frunze, the team of Fetrovyk Khust walked of the pitch on the 25th minute in the protest of a referee's decision.

== Top scorers ==
- Oleh Holubev (Antratsyt Kirovske) - 14
- Kostiantyn Pinchuk (Dynamo Luhansk) - 14
- Zamir Selimov (Frunzenets Frunze) - 14 (3)
- Andriy Zolotaryov (Shakhtar Horlivka) - 12 (1)
- Mykhailo Pysko (Promin Sambir) - 11
- Volodymyr Malyovanets (Naftokhimik Kremenchuk) - 11 (3)

== See also ==
- Ukrainian Second League 1992–93
- Ukrainian First League 1992–93
- Amateur championship 1992-1993
- 1992-93 Ukrainian Cup
