= 1991 KFK competitions (Ukraine) =

KFK competitions
- Season: 1991
- Champions: Novator Mariupol (among 6 group winners): Krystal Chortkiv (Group 1); Nyva Berezhany (Group 2); Polihraftekhnika Oleksandriya (Group 3); Tytan Armyansk (Group 4); Antratsyt Kirovske (Group 5); Novator Mariupol (Group 6)

The 1991 KFK competitions in Ukraine were republican level competitions conducted by the Football Federation of the Ukrainian SSR. It was 27th season of the KFK in Ukraine since its introduction in 1964 and the last season of the Soviet football competitions. The format established before the season was preserved and the top three teams eventually qualified to the 1992 Ukrainian First League, the other top performers from each group qualified for the 1992 Ukrainian Transfer League.

== Composition ==
Group 1		Group 2		Group 3	
Region	Teams	Region	Teams	Region	Teams
Ternopil Oblast (3)	Krystal Chortkiv	Ternopil Oblast (2)	Nyva Berezhany	Kirovohrad Oblast (1)	Polihraftekhnika Oleksandria
Ternopil Oblast (3)	Zbruch Borshchiv	Ternopil Oblast (2)	Dnister Zalishchyky	Sumy Oblast (1)	Yavir Krasnopillia
Ternopil Oblast (3)	Kolos Zboriv	Zhytomyr Oblast (2)	Keramik Baranivka	Zaporizhia Oblast (2)	Druzhba Osypenko
Zhytomyr Oblast (1)	Khimik Zhytomyr	Zhytomyr Oblast (2)	Prohres Berdychiv	Zaporizhia Oblast (2)	Torpedo Melitopol
Lviv Oblast (2)	Hazovyk Komarno	Lviv Oblast (1)	Promin Volia-Baranetska	Poltava Oblast (3)	Naftovyk Kremenchuk
Lviv Oblast (2)	Spartak Sambir	Khmelnytskyi Oblast (1)	Traktor Khmelnytskyi	Poltava Oblast (3)	Sula Lubny
Ivano-Frankivsk Oblast (2)	Halychyna Broshniv	Ivano-Frankivsk Oblast (2)	Enerhetyk Burshtyn	Poltava Oblast (3)	Lokomotyv Komsomolsk
Ivano-Frankivsk Oblast (2)	Khimik Kalush	Ivano-Frankivsk Oblast (2)	Naftovyk Dolyna	Mykolaiv Oblast (1)	Olimpia Yuzhnoukrainsk
Zakarpattia Oblast (1)	Andezyt Khust	Zakarpattia Oblast (1)	Keramik Vynohradiv	Odesa Oblast (3)	Dynamo Odesa
Rivne Oblast (1)	Ikva Mlyniv	Rivne Oblast (1)	Zoria Rivne	Odesa Oblast (3)	Dnister Bilhorod-Dnistrovsky
Vinnytsia Oblast (3)	Iskra Teofipol	Volyn Oblast (1)	Pidshypnyk Lutsk	Odesa Oblast (3)	Torpedo Odesa
Vinnytsia Oblast (3)	Hranyt Sharhorod	Vinnytsia Oblast (1)	Podillia Kyrnasivka	Vinnytsia Oblast (1)	Intehral Vinnytsia
Vinnytsia Oblast (3)	Avanhard Ladyzhyn	Kyiv Oblast (3)	Refryzherator Fastiv	Cherkasy Oblast (3)	Rotor Cherkasy
Kyiv Oblast (3)	Mashynobudivnyk Borodyanka	Kyiv Oblast (3)	Nyva Myronivka	Cherkasy Oblast (3)	Spartak Zolotonosha
Kyiv Oblast (3)	Blyskavka Baryshivka	Kyiv Oblast (3)	Promin Bila Tserkva	Cherkasy Oblast (3)	Khliborob Chornobai
Kyiv Oblast (3)	Budivelnyk Ivankiv	Kyiv Oblast (3)	Promin Bila Tserkva	Cherkasy Oblast (3)	Khliborob Chornobai

Group 4		Group 5		Group 6	
Region	Teams	Region	Teams	Region	Teams
AR Crimea (5)	Tytan Armyansk	Donetsk Oblast (6)	Novator Mariupol	Donetsk Oblast (6)	Antratsyt Kirovske
AR Crimea (5)	More Feodosia	Donetsk Oblast (6)	Hirnyk Khartsyzk	Donetsk Oblast (6)	Prometei Shakhtarsk
AR Crimea (5)	Frunzenets Frunze	Donetsk Oblast (6)	Shakhtar Horlivka	Donetsk Oblast (6)	Bazhanovets Makiivka
AR Crimea (5)	Surozh Sudak	Donetsk Oblast (6)	Tsvetmet Artemivsk	Donetsk Oblast (6)	Shakhtar Snizhne
AR Crimea (5)	Syvash Ishun	Donetsk Oblast (6)	Sotsdonbasovets Donetsk	Donetsk Oblast (6)	Krystal Torez
Kherson Oblast (4)	Meliorator Kakhovka	Donetsk Oblast (6)	Kolos Oleksandrivka	Donetsk Oblast (6)	Vuhlyk Krasnoarmiysk
Kherson Oblast (4)	Enerhia Nova Kakhovka	Sumy Oblast (2)	Elektron Romny	Luhansk Oblast (3)	Shakhtar Sverdlovsk
Kherson Oblast (4)	Kolos Osokorivka	Sumy Oblast (2)	Budivelnyk Sumy	Luhansk Oblast (3)	Antratsyt
Kherson Oblast (4)	Tavria Novotroitske	Dnipropetrovsk Oblast (2)	Radyst Dniprodzerzhynsk	Luhansk Oblast (3)	Sokil Rovenky
Dnipropetrovsk Oblast (2)	Shakhtar Ordzhonikidze	Dnipropetrovsk Oblast (2)	Hirnyk Pavlohrad	Kharkiv Oblast (2)	Avanhard Lozova
Dnipropetrovsk Oblast (2)	Avanhard Zhovti Vody	Poltava Oblast (1)	Zoria Karlivka	Kharkiv Oblast (2)	Fakel Krasnohrad
Mykolaiv Oblast (4)	Frehat Pervomaisk	Kharkiv Oblast (2)	Metalurh Kupiansk	Sumy Oblast (2)	Khimik Sumy
Mykolaiv Oblast (4)	Kolos Novokrasne	Kharkiv Oblast (2)	Kolos Kolomak	Sumy Oblast (2)	Viktoria Lebedyn
Mykolaiv Oblast (4)	Vodnyk Mykolaiv	Luhansk Oblast (2)	MALS Lutuhine	Zaporizhia Oblast (2)	Dizelyst Tokmak
Mykolaiv Oblast (4)	Nyva Nechayane	Luhansk Oblast (2)	Shakhtar Krasnyi Luch	Zaporizhia Oblast (2)	Olimpiets Prymorsk
Odesa Oblast (1)	Khvylia Illichivsk	Zaporizhia Oblast (1)	Enerhia Berdiansk	Dnipropetrovsk Oblast (1)	Metalurh Kryvyi Rih

The information on the competition is incomplete.

== Group 1 ==
Pos	Team	Pld	W	D	L	GF	GA	GD	Pts	Promotion or relegation
1	Krystal Chortkiv (Q)	30	24	5	1	85	12	+73	53	Final pool
2	Andezyt Khust	30	18	6	6	64	32	+32	42	Promoted to 1992 Transitional League
3	Hazovyk Komarno	30	18	5	7	63	35	+28	41	Promoted to 1992 Transitional League
4	Spartak Sambir	30	17	6	7	70	33	+37	40	
5	Halychyna Broshniv	30	14	8	8	47	24	+23	36	
6	Khimik Zhytomyr	30	15	3	12	40	35	+5	33	
7	Zbruch Borshchiv	30	15	3	12	44	46	−2	33	
8	Khimik Kalush	30	11	10	9	48	40	+8	32	
9	Iskra Teofipil	30	11	6	13	35	29	+6	28	
10	Ikva Mlyniv	30	9	8	13	30	43	−13	26	
11	Hranyt Sharhorod	30	10	4	16	35	61	−26	24	
12	Mashinobudivnyk Borodianka	30	9	6	15	31	40	−9	24	
13	Blyskivka Baryshivka	30	10	2	18	37	55	−18	22	
14	Budivelnyk Ivankiv	30	9	3	18	34	53	−19	21	
15	Avanhard Ladyzhyn	30	8	3	19	23	67	−44	19	
16	Kolos Zboriv	30	2	2	26	16	97	−81	6	

Source: ukr-football.org.ua, footbook.ru
(Q) Qualified for the phase indicated

== Group 2 ==
Pos	Team	Pld	W	D	L	GF	GA	GD	Pts	Promotion or relegation
1	Nyva Berezhany (Q)	28	20	7	1	47	11	+36	47	Final pool
2	Dnister Zalishchyky	28	17	4	7	48	24	+24	38	Promoted to 1992 Transitional League
3	Promin Volia-Baranetska	28	16	5	7	40	24	+16	37	Promoted to 1992 Transitional League
4	Refryzherator Fastiv	28	16	2	10	44	26	+18	34	
5	Pidshypnyk Lutsk	28	15	2	11	53	32	+21	32	
6	Keramik Baranivka	28	14	4	10	47	31	+16	32	
7	Nyva Myronivka	27	13	5	9	45	36	+9	31 (Note: In the source for this table, the total number of games played, 28, is not equal to the sum of the number of games won, drawn, and lost.)	Promoted to 1992–93 Transitional League
8	Podillia Kamianets-Podilsky	28	11	5	12	36	44	−8	27	
9	Promin Bila Tserkva	28	8	7	13	26	33	−7	23	
10	Prohres Berdychiv	28	7	8	13	26	50	−24	22	
11	Enerhetyk Burshtyn	28	9	3	16	34	45	−11	21	
12	Zoria Rivne	28	8	3	17	32	52	−20	19	
13	Naftovyk Dolyna	28	7	4	17	33	53	−20	18	
14	Traktor Khmelnytsky	28	7	4	17	33	53	−20	18	
15	Keramik Vynohradove	27	6	3	18	24	55	−31	15	

Source: ukr-football.org.ua, footbook.ru
(Q) Qualified for the phase indicated

== Group 3 ==
Pos	Team	Pld	W	D	L	GF	GA	GD	Pts	Promotion or relegation
1	Polihraftekhnika Oleksandriya (Q)	28	23	1	4	55	15	+40	47	Final pool
2	Yavir Krasnopillia	28	19	5	4	54	21	+33	43	Promoted to 1992 Transitional League
3	Druzhba Osypenko	28	17	4	7	45	23	+22	38	Promoted to 1992 Transitional League
4	Naftovyk Kremenchuk	28	16	6	6	43	20	+23	38	Promoted to 1992–93 Transitional League
5	Sula Lubny	28	16	4	8	45	25	+20	36	
6	Intehral Vinnytsia	28	14	4	10	32	25	+7	32	
7	Lokomotyv Komsomolsk	28	13	2	13	32	40	−8	28	
8	Dynamo Odesa	28	11	4	13	40	35	+5	26	
9	Dnister Bilhorod-Dnistrovsky	28	8	10	10	32	33	−1	26	
10	Rotor Cherkasy	28	7	8	13	29	42	−13	22	
11	Torpedo Melitopil	28	7	7	14	24	32	−8	21	Promoted to 1992–93 Transitional League
12	Spartak Zolotonosha	28	7	6	15	31	49	−18	20	
13	Olimpiya Yuzhnoukrainsk	28	7	5	16	23	49	−26	19	
14	Torpedo Odesa	28	3	8	17	22	47	−25	14	
15	Khliborob Chornobai	28	4	2	22	12	63	−51	10	

Source: ukr-football.org.ua, footbook.ru
(Q) Qualified for the phase indicated

Notes

- Temp Korsun-Shevchenkivskyi withdrew and its results were annulled.

== Group 4 ==
Pos	Team	Pld	W	D	L	GF	GA	GD	Pts	Promotion or relegation
1	Tytan Armyansk (Q)	30	22	8	0	69	15	+54	52	Final pool
2	Meliorator Kakhovka	30	21	5	4	73	27	+46	47	Promoted to 1992 Transitional League
3	More Feodosia	30	18	8	4	53	20	+33	44	Promoted to 1992 Transitional League
4	Frunzenets Frunze	30	17	7	6	48	18	+30	41	Promoted to 1992–93 Transitional League
5	Surozh Sudak	30	14	11	5	65	20	+45	39	
6	Enerhiya Nova Kakhovka	30	16	4	10	50	33	+17	36	
7	Kolos Osokorivka	30	15	5	10	37	29	+8	35	
8	Shakhtar Ordzhonikidze	30	15	5	10	39	41	−2	35	
9	Frehat Pervomaisk	30	16	2	12	40	31	+9	34	
10	Tavriya Novotroitsk	30	10	5	15	46	53	−7	25	
11	Syvash Ishun	30	8	8	14	31	38	−7	24	
12	Kolos Novokrasne	30	7	7	16	32	46	−14	21	
13	Avanhard Zhovti Vody	30	6	2	22	18	63	−45	14	withdrew
14	Vodnyk Mykolaiv	30	3	6	21	22	74	−52	12	
15	Nyva Nechayane	30	4	4	22	16	74	−58	12	
16	Khvylya Illichivsk	30	3	3	24	16	73	−57	9	

Source: ukr-football.org.ua, footbook.ru
(Q) Qualified for the phase indicated

== Group 5 ==
Pos	Team	Pld	W	D	L	GF	GA	GD	Pts	Promotion or relegation
1	Antratsyt Kirovske (Q)	30	24	5	1	64	20	+44	53	Final pool
2	Prometei Shakhtarsk	30	22	4	4	69	17	+52	48	Promoted to 1992 Transitional League
3	Bazhanovets Makiivka	30	17	6	7	50	28	+22	40	Promoted to 1992 Transitional League
4	Shakhtar Sverdlovsk	30	18	3	9	56	30	+26	39	
5	Shakhtar Snizhne	30	17	5	8	61	36	+25	39	
6	Krystal Torez	30	13	9	8	47	36	+11	35	
7	Avanhard Lozova	30	12	7	11	34	31	+3	31	
8	Khimik Sumy	30	11	7	12	42	41	+1	29	
9	Viktoriya Lebedyn	30	10	8	12	38	45	−7	28	
10	Dyzelist Tokmak	30	10	5	15	38	50	−12	25	
11	Fakel Krasnohrad	30	9	5	16	29	50	−21	23	
12	Antratsyt	30	10	1	19	42	74	−32	21	
13	Metalurh Kryvyi Rih	30	9	3	18	29	45	−16	21	
14	Sokil Rovenky	30	8	4	18	28	43	−15	20	
14	Vuhlyk Krasnoarmiysk	30	6	6	18	35	60	−25	18	
14	Olimpiets Prymorsk	30	4	2	24	26	82	−56	10	

Source: ukr-football.org.ua, footbook.ru
(Q) Qualified for the phase indicated

== Group 6 ==
Pos	Team	Pld	W	D	L	GF	GA	GD	Pts	Promotion or relegation
1	Novator Mariupil (Q)	30	20	10	0	65	19	+46	50	Final pool
2	Hirnyk Khartsyzk	30	17	10	3	65	35	+30	44	Promoted to 1992 Transitional League
3	Elektron Romny	30	14	12	4	55	25	+30	40	Promoted to 1992 Transitional League
4	Shakhtar Horlivka	30	13	8	9	41	31	+10	34	Promoted to 1992–93 Transitional League
5	Budivelnyk Sumy	30	12	10	8	46	38	+8	34	
6	Prometei Dniprodzerzhynsk (Note: In the first half, FC Prometei Dniprodzerzhynsk was called Radyst.)	30	13	7	10	47	40	+7	33	Promoted to 1992–93 Transitional League
7	Zoria Karlivka	30	11	11	8	23	22	+1	33	
8	Metalurh Kupyansk	30	9	15	6	40	28	+12	33	
9	Kolormet Artemivsk	30	12	7	11	39	38	+1	31	
10	MALS Lutuhine	30	7	13	10	32	45	−13	27	
11	Kolos Kolomak	30	8	8	14	35	55	−20	24	
12	Sotsdonbasivets Donetsk	30	10	3	17	39	53	−14	23	
13	Shakhtar Krasny Luch	30	5	11	14	28	48	−20	21	
14	Hirnyk Pavlohrad	30	6	8	16	24	40	−16	20	withdrew
14	Kolos Oleksandrivka	30	7	4	19	27	50	−23	18	withdrew
14	Enerhiya Berdyansk	30	5	5	20	18	57	−39	15	withdrew

Source: ukr-football.org.ua, footbook.ru
(Q) Qualified for the phase indicated

== Final ==
Pos	Team	Pld	W	D	L	GF	GA	GD	Pts	Promotion or relegation
1	Novator Mariupil (H)	5	4	1	0	9	3	+6	9	Promoted to First League
2	Krystal Chortkiv	5	3	2	0	8	4	+4	8	Promoted to First League
3	Polihraftekhnika Oleksandirya	5	2	2	1	5	3	+2	6	Promoted to First League
4	Nyva Berezhany	5	2	0	3	4	6	−2	4	Promoted to Transitional League
5	Tytan Armyansk	5	1	1	3	3	7	−4	3	Promoted to Transitional League
6	Antratsyt Kirovske	5	0	0	5	4	10	−6	0	Promoted to Transitional League

Source: ukr-football.org.ua, footbook.ru
(H) Hosts
