= 1988 KFK competitions (Ukraine) =

KFK competitions
- Season: 1988
- Champions: Kremin Kremenchuk

The 1988 KFK competitions in Ukraine were part of the 1988 Soviet KFK competitions that were conducted in the Soviet Union. It was 24th season of the KFK in Ukraine since its introduction in 1964. The winner eventually qualified to the 1989 Soviet Second League.

== Group 1 ==
Pos	Team	Pld	W	D	L	GF	GA	GD	Pts	Qualification
1	Nyva Berezhany	18	12	4	2	29	16	+13	28	Qualified
2	Pidshypnyk Lutsk	18	11	4	3	35	10	+25	26	
3	Prylad Mukacheve	18	8	6	4	22	18	+4	22	
4	Zirka Zhytomyr	18	8	3	7	21	24	−3	19	
5	Tsukrovyk Chortkiv	18	8	2	8	24	26	−2	18	
6	Burevisnyk Kamianets-Podilskyi	18	7	4	7	19	22	−3	18	
7	Intehral Vinnytsia	18	7	1	10	27	30	−3	15	
8	Bystrytsia Nadvirna	18	4	5	9	15	24	−9	13	
9	Emalposud Chernivtsi	18	5	2	11	21	34	−13	12	
10	Avanhard Drohobych	18	5	0	13	15	24	−9	10	

Source: ukr-footbal.org.ua, footbook.ru

== Group 2 ==
Pos	Team	Pld	W	D	L	GF	GA	GD	Pts	Qualification
1	Avanhard Zhydachiv	18	13	2	3	40	11	+29	28	Qualified
2	Kooperator Khust	18	11	2	5	27	23	+4	24	
3	Naftovyk Dolyna	18	10	3	5	27	15	+12	23	
4	Prohres Berdychiv	18	9	5	4	27	15	+12	23	
5	Kolos Kalush	18	7	5	6	14	11	+3	19	
6	Izotop Kuznietsovsk	18	7	2	9	11	19	−8	16	
7	Refryzherator Fastiv	18	5	6	7	11	14	−3	16	
8	Avtomobilist Lviv	18	3	9	6	19	19	0	15	
9	Sokil Haisyn	18	3	3	12	17	37	−20	9	
10	Spartak Dubno	18	3	1	14	11	41	−30	7	

Source: ukr-footbal.org.ua, footbook.ru

== Group 3 ==
Pos	Team	Pld	W	D	L	GF	GA	GD	Pts	Qualification
1	SKA Kiev	22	15	4	3	55	16	+39	34	Qualified
2	Metalurh Kupyansk	22	15	4	3	44	12	+32	34	
3	Mashynobudivnyk Borodyanka	22	16	1	5	52	20	+32	33	
4	Khimik Bezdryk	22	13	4	5	40	22	+18	30	
5	Skhid Kyiv	22	10	6	6	44	24	+20	26	
6	Sula Lubny	22	9	4	9	39	27	+12	22	
7	Tsementnyk Balakleya	22	7	5	10	28	30	−2	19	
8	Budivelnyk Slavutych	22	7	4	11	28	36	−8	18	
9	Temp Cherkasy	22	6	6	10	28	38	−10	18	
10	Avanhard Smila	22	5	0	17	31	44	−13	10	
11	Inhulets Kryvyi Rih	22	3	2	17	29	72	−43	8	
12	Lokomotyv Znamyanka	22	0	2	20	7	79	−72	2	

Source: sports.ru, ukr-footbal.org.ua, footbook.ru

== Group 4 ==
Pos	Team	Pld	W	D	L	GF	GA	GD	Pts	Qualification
1	Kremin Kremenchuk	20	14	4	2	46	14	+32	32	Qualified
2	Avanhard Lozova	20	11	5	4	30	13	+17	27	
3	Khliborob Chornobai	20	9	5	6	36	30	+6	23	
4	Naftovyk Pyriatyn	20	9	5	6	19	21	−2	23	
5	Frunzenets Sumy	20	8	5	7	30	24	+6	21	
6	Elektron Romny	18	8	4	6	37	37	0	20	
7	Shakhtar Dzerzhynsk	20	6	8	6	20	27	−7	20	
8	Radyst Kirovohrad	20	5	5	10	27	26	+1	15	
9	Kolormet Artemivsk	20	7	0	13	17	37	−20	14	
10	Bilshovyk Kyiv	20	4	6	10	31	40	−9	14	
11	Shakhtar Oleksandria	20	2	5	13	13	46	−33	9	

Source: ukr-footbal.org.ua, footbook.ru

== Group 5 ==
Pos	Team	Pld	W	D	L	GF	GA	GD	Pts	Qualification
1	Dynamo Odessa	20	15	4	1	34	9	+25	34	Qualified
2	Enerhiya Nova Kakhovka	20	16	1	3	39	14	+25	33	
3	SKCF Sevastopol	20	13	3	4	37	14	+23	29	
4	Tytan Armiansk	20	10	2	8	31	21	+10	22	
5	Torpedo Berdiansk	20	7	5	8	19	23	−4	19	
6	Torpedo Melitopol	20	6	6	8	19	34	−15	18	
7	Iskra Pervomaisk	20	7	3	10	27	35	−8	17	
8	Avanhard Dzhankoy	20	7	2	11	22	24	−2	16	
9	Sudnoremontnyk Illichivsk	20	6	1	13	20	35	−15	13	
10	Shliakhovyk Kherson	20	4	3	13	21	35	−14	11	
11	Vodnyk Mykolaiv	20	1	6	13	11	35	−24	8	

Source: ukr-footbal.org.ua, footbook.ru

== Group 6 ==
Pos	Team	Pld	W	D	L	GF	GA	GD	Pts	Qualification
1	Stakhanovets Stakhanov	22	16	5	1	48	10	+38	37	Qualified
2	Pivdenstal Yenakieve	22	15	1	6	46	26	+20	31	
3	Sotsdonbas Donetsk	22	14	3	5	33	19	+14	31	
4	Khimik Severodonetsk	22	12	4	6	47	31	+16	28	
5	Kirovets Makiivka	22	9	7	6	32	26	+6	25	
6	Shakhtar Lutuhine	22	10	3	9	49	33	+16	23	
7	Olimpiets Prymorske	22	9	1	12	36	41	−5	19	
8	Mashynobudivnyk Druzhkivka	22	7	5	10	16	32	−16	19	
9	Shakhtar Sverdlovsk	22	7	4	11	31	28	+3	18	
10	Kolos Osokorivka	22	5	8	9	29	38	−9	18	
11	Hirnyk Pavlohrad	22	5	5	12	22	29	−7	15	
12	Komunarets Komunarsk	22	1	1	20	15	91	−76	3	

Source: ukr-footbal.org.ua, footbook.ru

== Final ==
Pos	Team	Pld	W	D	L	GF	GA	GD	Pts	Promotion
1	Kremin Kremenchuk	5	4	0	1	12	7	+5	8	Promoted to Second League
2	Stakhanovets Stakhanov	5	2	2	1	5	4	+1	6	
3	Dynamo Odessa	5	2	2	1	4	5	−1	6	
4	SKA Kiev	5	1	2	2	10	8	+2	4	
5	Avanhard Zhydachiv	5	1	1	3	4	8	−4	3	
6	Nyva Berezhany	5	0	3	2	3	6	−3	3	

Source: ukr-football.org.ua
