= 1992 Ukrainian First League =

Ukrainian football season

Ukrainian First League
- Season: 1992
- Champions: Veres (Group A); Kryvbas (Group B)
- Promoted: Veres, Kryvbas
- Relegated: 10 teams
- Matches: 364
- Goals: 845 (2.32 per match)
- Top goalscorer: (16) D.Filimonov (Kryvbas)
- Biggest home win: Shakhtar (Pvl) - Azovets 6:0 (Round 28, Gr.B)
- Biggest away win: Zakarpattia - Skala 0:4 (Round 29, Gr.B)
- Highest scoring: Vorskla - Shakhtar (Pvl) 4:3 (Round 17, Gr.B)

1992 Ukrainian First League was the first Ukrainian First League (second tier) season with the record number of teams participating in the league at 28, divided into groups. The season started on March 14 and finished on July 5, 1992.

At the end of the season, the five worst teams from each of the two groups were relegated to the Ukrainian Second League (the third tier). The winners of each group qualified for the top league for the next season. There was no title game scheduled between the group winners.

== Teams ==
In the 1992 season, the Ukrainian First League consisted mostly of clubs that had competed in the Soviet Second League (Ukrainian Zone). The league was split into two groups A (mostly western and central Ukraine) and B (mostly eastern and southern Ukraine).

=== Map ===
Locations of teams in First League

=== Pre-season organization ===
Team	Location	Venue	Capacity	League and position in 1991		Coach	Replaced coach
Halychyna	Drohobych	Kranovyk Stadium		Soviet Second League	18	Borys Rassykhin	
Vorskla	Poltava	Vorskla Stadium		Soviet Second League	19	(Uzbekistan) Sergei Dotsenko	
Kolos	Nikopol	Metalurh Stadium		Soviet Second League "B" (Championship of the Ukrainian SSR)	3	Volodymyr Nechayev	
Veres	Rivne	Avanhard Stadium		Soviet Second League "B" (Championship of the Ukrainian SSR)	4	Viktor Nosov	
Pryladyst	Mukachevo	October 50th Anniversary Stadium		Soviet Second League "B" (Championship of the Ukrainian SSR)	5	Vilmos Telinger	
Krystal	Kherson	Krystal Stadium		Soviet Second League "B" (Championship of the Ukrainian SSR)	6	Anatoliy Lebid	Igor Gamula
Ros	Bila Tserkva	Trudovi Rezervy Stadium		Soviet Second League "B" (Championship of the Ukrainian SSR)	7	Stanislav Honcharenko	
Avtomobilist	Sumy	Kolos Stadium		Soviet Second League "B" (Championship of the Ukrainian SSR)	8	Mykhailo Fomenko	
Polissya	Zhytomyr	LKSMU Stadium		Soviet Second League "B" (Championship of the Ukrainian SSR)	10	Zaya Avdysh	
Kryvbas	Kryvyi Rih	Metalurh Stadium		Soviet Second League "B" (Championship of the Ukrainian SSR)	11	Volodymyr Sryzhevskyi	
Shakhtar	Pavlohrad	Shakhtar Stadium		Soviet Second League "B" (Championship of the Ukrainian SSR)	12	Anatoliy Keskyula	
Desna	Chernihiv	Gagarin Stadium		Soviet Second League "B" (Championship of the Ukrainian SSR)	13	Yuriy Hruznov	
Podillya	Khmelnytskyi	Podillya Stadium		Soviet Second League "B" (Championship of the Ukrainian SSR)	14	Hryhoriy Ishchenko	
Zakarpattia	Uzhhorod	Avanhard Stadium		Soviet Second League "B" (Championship of the Ukrainian SSR)	15	Stepan Voitko	
Skala	Stryi	Sokil Stadium		Soviet Second League "B" (Championship of the Ukrainian SSR)	16	Mykhailo Vilkhovyi	
Stal	Alchevsk	Stal Stadium		Soviet Second League "B" (Championship of the Ukrainian SSR)	17	Anatoliy Volobuyev	
Dnipro	Cherkasy	Central Stadium		Soviet Second League "B" (Championship of the Ukrainian SSR)	18	Viktor Zhylin	
Khimik	Severodonetsk	Khimik Stadium		Soviet Second League "B" (Championship of the Ukrainian SSR)	19	Vadym Dobizha	
Vahonobudivnyk	Kadiivka	Peremoha Stadium		Soviet Second League "B" (Championship of the Ukrainian SSR)	20	Oleksandr Tkachenko	
SKA	Kyiv	SKA Stadium		Soviet Second League "B" (Championship of the Ukrainian SSR)	21	Oleh Feshchukov	
Chaika	Sevastopol	Chaika Stadium		Soviet Second League "B" (Championship of the Ukrainian SSR)	22	Oleksiy Rudyka	
Artania	Ochakiv	Sokil Stadium		Soviet Second League "B" (Championship of the Ukrainian SSR)	23	Valeriy Zhuravko	
Chornomorets-2	Odesa	SKA Stadium		Soviet Top League Reserves	6	Vitaliy Sidnyov	
Dynamo-2	Kyiv	Dynamo Stadium		Soviet Top League Reserves	12	Volodymyr Onyshchenko	
Shakhtar-2	Kostyantynivka	Avtosteklo Stadium		Soviet Top League Reserves	14	Yevhen Korol	
Novator	Mariupol	Sport Complex Azovstal		Ukrainian KFK competitions	1	Yuriy Kerman	
Krystal	Chortkiv	Kharchovyk Stadium		Ukrainian KFK competitions	2	(Russia) Boris Streltsov	
Polihraftekhnika	Oleksandriya	Shakhtar Stadium		Ukrainian KFK competitions	3	Yuriy Koval	Oleksandr Ishchenko

- Games of Chornomorets-2 were conducted at various stadiums such as Chornomorets Stadium, OSPO Stadium, ZRSS Stadium, Stankozavod Stadium, SRZ Stadium.
- Some games of Ros were conducted at the Kolos Stadium in Terezyne (Bila Tserkva Raion).
- Some games of Pryladyst were conducted at Spartak Stadium.
- Some games of Dnipro were conducted at Avanhard Stadium in Smila

=== Name changes before season ===
- The city of Kommunarsk changed back to Alchevsk
- Karpaty Kamyanka-Buzka was swapped with Skala Stryi, which was a runner of the Lviv Oblast football competitions
- Mayak Ochakiv changed its name to Artania Ochakiv
- Dynamo Bila Tserkva to Ros Bila Terkva
- Novator Mariupol to Azovets Mariupol
- Kolos Nikopol to Metalurh Nikopol

== Group A ==
=== Group A standings ===
Pos	Team	Pld	W	D	L	GF	GA	GD	Pts	Promotion or relegation
1	Veres Rivne (C, P)	26	14	8	4	38	15	+23	36	Promoted to Vyshcha Liha
2	Pryladyst Mukacheve	26	14	5	7	27	15	+12	33	
3	Polihraftekhnika Oleksandriya	26	11	8	7	25	27	−2	30	
4	Podillia Khmelnytsky	26	10	10	6	29	21	+8	30	
5	Krystal Chortkiv	26	11	7	8	34	26	+8	29	
6	Desna Chernihiv	26	11	7	8	23	24	−1	29	
7	Dynamo-2 Kyiv	26	9	10	7	33	23	+10	28	
8	Avtomobilist Sumy	26	11	4	11	29	29	0	26	
9	Stal Alchevsk	26	9	8	9	28	22	+6	26	
10	Polissia Zhytomyr (R)	26	10	5	11	30	31	−1	25	Relegated to Second League
11	Halychyna Drohobych (R)	26	9	5	12	25	32	−7	23	Relegated to Second League
12	Dnipro Cherkasy (R)	26	9	4	13	22	27	−5	22	Relegated to Second League
13	Chaika Sevastopol (R)	26	7	4	15	19	39	−20	18	Relegated to Second League
14	SKA Kyiv (R)	26	3	3	20	14	45	−31	9	Relegated to Second League

(C) Champions; (P) Promoted; (R) Relegated

=== Goalscorers ===
- (Russia) Aleksei Snigiryov (FC Veres Rivne) 10
- Valeriy Kinashenko (FC Pryladyst Mukacheve) 10

=== Hat-tricks ===
Player	For	Against	Result	Date
Valeriy Kinashenko	Pryladyst Mukacheve	Avtomobilist Sumy	3–0 (A)	3 April 1992
(Kyrgyzstan) Tagir Fasakhov	Krystal Chortkiv	Chaika Sevastopol	4–0 (H)	8 April 1992

=== Clean sheets ===
Rank	Player	Club	Clean sheets
1	Serhiy Kvasnikov	Pryladyst Mukachevo	17
2	(Russia) Viktor Derbunov	Veres Rivne	15
3	Yuriy Melashenko	Desna Chernihiv	14
4	Oleh Dibrova	Polihraftekhnika Oleksandriya	12
5	Arkadiy Batalov	Podillya Khmelnytskyi	11

== Group B ==
=== Group B standings ===
Pos	Team	Pld	W	D	L	GF	GA	GD	Pts	Promotion or relegation
1	Kryvbas Kryvyi Rih (C, P)	26	15	10	1	46	23	+23	40	Promoted to Vyshcha Liha
2	Metalurh Nikopol	26	15	7	4	45	19	+26	37	
3	Artania Ochakiv	26	13	6	7	27	24	+3	32	
4	Ros Bila Tserkva	26	13	5	8	40	32	+8	31	
5	Zakarpattia Uzhhorod	26	13	5	8	28	25	+3	31	
6	Skala Stryi	26	11	9	6	39	24	+15	31	
7	Shakhtar Pavlohrad	26	13	4	9	46	33	+13	30	
8	Vorskla Poltava	26	12	5	9	33	25	+8	29	
9	Khimik Severodonetsk	26	10	7	9	28	28	0	27	
10	Krystal Kherson (R)	26	10	5	11	36	36	0	25	Relegated to Second League
11	Azovets Mariupol (R)	26	10	4	12	36	39	−3	24	Relegated to Second League
12	Shakhtar-2 Donetsk (R)	26	5	2	19	25	48	−23	12	Relegated to Second League
13	Vahonobudivnyk Stakhanov (R)	26	4	3	19	16	48	−32	11	Relegated to Second League
14	Chornomorets-2 Odesa (R)	26	0	4	22	14	55	−41	4	Relegated to Second League

(C) Champions; (P) Promoted; (R) Relegated

=== Goalscorers ===
- Denys Filimonov (FC Kryvbas Kryvyi Rih) 16
- Viktor Hromov (FC Shakhtar Pavlohrad) 14
- Oleksandr Haiduk (FC Ros Bila Tserkva) 11
- Vadym Oliynyk (FC Metalurh Nikopol) 10
- Hennadiy Moroz (FC Kryvbas Kryvyi Rih) 9
- Hennadiy Zamriy (FC Zakarpattia Uzhhorod) 9
- Oleksandr Pindeyev (FC Vorskla Poltava/FC Chornomorets-2 Odesa) 9
- Ihor Nichenko (FC Krystal Kherson/FC Metalist Kharkiv) 9

=== Hat-tricks ===
Player	For	Against	Result	Date
Valeriy Yefremov	Azovets Mariupol	Vahonobudivnyk Stakhanov	4–1 (H)	14 May 1992
Volodymyr Trubnykov	Shakhtar Pavlohrad	Azovets Mariupol	6–0 (H)	29 June 1992

=== Clean sheets ===
Rank	Player	Club	Clean sheets
1	Serhiy Kiriyenko	Metalurh Nikopol	12
2	Volodymyr Vasiutyk	Zakarpattia Uzhhorod	11

== See also ==
- Ukrainian Premier League 1992
- Ukrainian Second League 1992
