= 1992 Ukrainian Transitional League =

Ukrainian Transitional League
- Season: 1992
- Dates: April 4, 1992 – July 4, 1992
- Champions: Dnister Zalischyky (Group 1); Bazhanovets Makiivka (Group 2)
- Runner up: Hazovyk Komarne; Titan Armyansk
- Top goalscorer: 11 - Oleh Vetrov (Bazhanovets) and Vitaliy Pushkutsa (Olympik)

The 1992 Ukrainian Transitional League was the first season of the 3rd level professional football in Ukraine. The season stretched from April 4, 1992, through July 4, 1992. The competition was divided into two groups according to geographical location in the country – 1 is western Ukraine and northeastern Ukraine, while 2 is eastern Ukraine and southern Ukraine. After this season the Transitional League has split into the Second League (3rd tier) and the Transitional League (4th tier).

== Organization ==
After the fall of the Soviet Union on January 1, 1992, most of the Ukrainian clubs that participated in the top three tiers of the All-Soviet League system, composed the 1992 Vyshcha Liha (Higher League). At the same time, the Ukrainian clubs that participated in the Soviet 4th tier, which was recently revived in 1990, had formed the new 1992 Persha Liha (First League). The participants of those two leagues were also included in the 1992 Ukrainian Cup competition.

The worst three teams that competed in the Soviet 4th tier (Buffer League or Soviet Second League "B"), which featured the Ukrainian republican football competition, along with other republican competitions, were conditionally relegated and joined the pool of former KFK teams to compete in the 1992 Perekhidna Liha (Transitional League). This new competition was composed of 18 teams, which were split geographically into two groups: Group 1 - West and North, Group 2 - East and South. Also, the clubs of this competition did not participate in the Ukrainian Cup. Upon the conclusion of the season, the league was split into the 3rd-tier Second League and the 4th-tier Transitional League. The top four clubs from each group entered the Second League competition, while the bottom five from each group entered the Transitional League competition.

=== Composition ===
Team	Location	Stadium	League and position in 1991		Coach	Replaced coach
Okean	Kerch	50ti-richia Zhovtnia	Soviet Second League "B"	24	Oleksiy Yakymovych	
Zirka	Kirovohrad	Zirka	Soviet Second League "B"	25	Mykola Fedorenko	
Mayak	Kharkiv	KhTZ Serp i Molot	Soviet Second League "B"	26	Mykola Machula	
Lysonya	Berezhany	Nyva Tsukrovyk, Khodoriv, Lviv Oblast	Ukrainian KFK competitions	2.1	Anatoliy Venhrynovych	
Tytan	Armyansk	Khimik	Ukrainian KFK competitions	4.1	Eduard Fedin	
Antratsyt	Kirovske	Yuvileinyi	Ukrainian KFK competitions	5.1	Yuriy Klokov	
Andezyt	Khust	Avanhard	Ukrainian KFK competitions	1.2	Karlo Soikov	
Dnister	Zalishchyky	Dnister	Ukrainian KFK competitions	2.2	Petro Chervin	
Yavir	Krasnopillya	Kolos	Ukrainian KFK competitions	3.2	Volodymyr Bohach; Mykola Astafiev	
Meliorator	Kakhovka	Avanhard	Ukrainian KFK competitions	4.2	Volodymyr Spiridonov	
Prometei	Shakhtarsk	Shakhtar	Ukrainian KFK competitions	5.2	Yuriy Vankevych	
Hirnyk	Khartsyzk	Kanatchyk	Ukrainian KFK competitions	6.2	Oleksandr Slyusarenko	
Hazovyk	Komarno	Hazovyk	Ukrainian KFK competitions	1.3	Volodymyr Zhuravchak	
Promin	Volia Baranetska	Spartak, Sambir, Lviv Oblast Kolos	Ukrainian KFK competitions	2.3	Yaroslav Khomyn	
Druzhba	Osypenko	Torpedo, Berdyansk, Zaporizhia Oblast	Ukrainian KFK competitions	3.3	Mykola Lyutyi	
More	Feodosiya	Albatross, Prymorskyi, AR Crimea	Ukrainian KFK competitions	4.3	Yuriy Naurzokov	
Bazhanovets	Makiivka	Bazhanovets Avanhard	Ukrainian KFK competitions	5.3	Viktor Pyshchov	
Elektron	Romny	Elektron	Ukrainian KFK competitions	6.3	Oleksandr Kvasha	

Notes:

- Positions in the table for KFK competitions are shown in format #.# where the first digit represents a group # and the second digit is the actual final position in the 1991 KFK competitions that consisted of six groups.
- Mayak changed its name to Olympik

=== Location map ===
Locations of team home grounds in the 1992 Ukrainian Second League
— Group 1 — Group 2

== Group 1 ==
Pos	Team	Pld	W	D	L	GF	GA	GD	Pts	Promotion or relegation
1	Dnister Zalishchyky	16	8	5	3	15	13	+2	21	Second League
2	Hazovyk Komarne	16	8	4	4	24	17	+7	20	Second League
3	Yavir Krasnopillia	16	8	4	4	21	19	+2	20	Second League
4	Zirka Kirovohrad	16	8	3	5	35	24	+11	19	Second League
5	Andezyt Khust	16	7	4	5	23	22	+1	18	Transitional League
6	Olympik Kharkiv	16	5	5	6	23	26	−3	15	Transitional League
7	Elektron Romny	16	5	2	9	22	29	−7	12	Transitional League
8	Lysonia Berezhany	16	2	6	8	14	21	−7	10	Transitional League
9	Promin Sambir Raion	16	1	7	8	22	28	−6	9	Transitional League

Source: uafootball.net.ua

=== Top goalscorers ===
	Scorer	Goals (Pen.)	Team
1	Vitaliy Pushkutsa	11 (3)	Olympik Kharkiv
2	Volodymyr Snylyk	9 (5)	Hazovyk Komarno

== Group 2 ==
Pos	Team	Pld	W	D	L	GF	GA	GD	Pts	Promotion or relegation
1	Bazhanovets Makiivka	16	10	3	3	25	8	+17	23	Second League
2	Titan Armyansk	16	8	5	3	19	10	+9	21	Second League
3	Meliorator Kakhovka	16	8	5	3	21	16	+5	21	Second League
4	Druzhba Osypenko	16	5	11	0	17	8	+9	21	Second League
5	Prometei Shakhtarsk	16	8	4	4	27	10	+17	20	Transitional League
6	Okean Kerch	16	6	5	5	16	10	+6	17	Transitional League
7	Hirnyk Khartsyzk	16	4	1	11	10	33	−23	9	Transitional League
8	Antratsyt Kirovske	16	2	3	11	15	32	−17	7	Transitional League
9	More Feodosia	16	1	3	12	2	25	−23	5	Transitional League

Source: uafootball.net.ua

=== Top goalscorers ===
	Scorer	Goals (Pen.)	Team
1	Oleh Vietrov	11 (4)	Bazhanovets Makiivka

== Number of teams by region ==
Number	Region	Team(s)
4	Donetsk Oblast	Hirnyk Khartsyzk, FC Antratsyt, Bazhanovets Makiivka, Prometei Shakhtarsk
3	Crimea	Tytan Armyansk, More Feodosia, Okean Kerch
2	Lviv Oblast	Hazovyk Komarno, Promin Volia Baranetska
2	Sumy Oblast	Yavir Krasnopillia, Elektron Romny
2	Ternopil Oblast	Dnister Zalishchyky, Lysonia Berezhany
1	Kharkiv Oblast	Olimpik Kharkiv
1	Kherson Oblast	Meliorator Kakhovka
1	Kirovohrad Oblast	Zirka Kirovohrad
1	Zakarpattia Oblast	Andezyt Khust
1	Zaporizhia Oblast	Druzhba Osypenko

== See also ==
- 1992 Ukrainian Higher League
- 1992 Ukrainian First League
- 1992 Ukrainian Cup
