= Oleh Ptachyk =

Ukrainian footballer

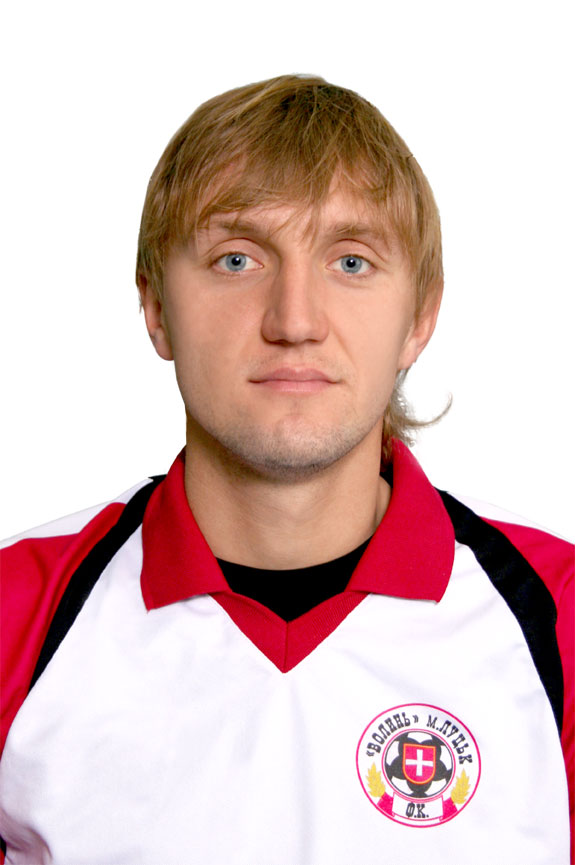

Personal information
- Full name: Oleh Ivanovych Ptachyk
- Date of birth: 14 November 1981 (age 44)
- Place of birth: Kharkiv, Ukrainian SSR, Soviet Union
- Height: 1.85 m (6 ft 1 in)
- Position: Defender

Youth career
- 1998–1999: Olimpik Kharkiv

Senior career*
Years	Team	Apps	(Gls)
2001–2003	Dnepr-Transmash Mogilev	31	(0)
2004	Spartak Sumy	28	(1)
2005	Nyva Vinnytsia	11	(0)
2005–2006	Chornomorets Odesa	4	(0)
2006–2007	Volyn Lutsk	27	(0)
2007–2008	Naftovyk Okhtyrka	8	(1)
- * Club domestic league appearances and goals as of 17 June 2010

Oleh Ivanovych Ptachyk (born 14 November 1981) is a retired Ukrainian football defender who last played for Naftovyk in the Ukrainian Premier League.
