= Tagir =

Tagir is a given name. Notable people with the name include:

- Tagir Fasakhov (1964–1996), Kyrgyzstani footballer
- Tagir Gadzhiev (born 1994), Dagestani rugby union player
- Tagir Khaybulaev (born 1984), Russian judoka
- Tagir Kusimov (1909–1986), Soviet military leader
- Tagir Musalov (born 1994), Russian-Azeri footballer
- Tagir Ulanbekov (born 1991), Russian mixed martial artist
- Ravil Tagir (born 2003), Kazakhstani footballer
