= Yuriy Vankevych =

Soviet footballer and coach

Personal information
- Full name: Yuriy Ivanovych Vankevych
- Date of birth: 26 January 1946 (age 80)
- Place of birth: Kiev, Ukrainian SSR, Soviet Union
- Height: 1.74 m (5 ft 8 1/2 in)
- Position: Defender

Youth career
- FC Dynamo Kyiv

Senior career*
Years	Team	Apps	(Gls)
1965–1970	FC Dynamo Kyiv	28	(0)
1965	→ FC Dynamo-2 Kyiv (loan)	28	(1)
1971	FC Metalist Kharkiv	35	(0)
1972	FC Avtomobilist Zhytomyr	15	(0)
1973–1977	FC Shakhtar Donetsk	85	(4)

Managerial career
- 1981: FC Ugolyok Horlivka (ass't)
- 1982–1985: FC Shakhtar Horlivka
- 1992: FC Prometei Shakhtarsk
- 1992: FC Khimik Severodonetsk
- 1993: FC Medita Shakhtarsk
- 1994–1995: FC Khimik Severodonetsk
- 1996–1997: FC Khimik Severodonetsk
- 2000–2003: FC Molniya Severodonetsk
- * Club domestic league appearances and goals

Yuriy Vankevych (Ukrainian: Юрій Іванович Ванкевич; 26 January 1946) is a former professional Soviet football defender and coach.
