= Valery Zhuravko =

Ukrainian footballer (1947–2020)

Valeriy Zhuravko
Personal information
- Full name: Valeriy Viktorovych Zhuravko
- Date of birth: 5 September 1947
- Place of birth: Ochakiv, Ukrainian SSR
- Date of death: 23 March 2020 (aged 72)
- Position: Forward

Senior career*
Years	Team	Apps	(Gls)
1966	Avanhard Zhovti Vody	38	(12)
1967–1969	Sudnobudivnyk Mykolaiv	63	(8)
1969–1970	Avanhard Zhovti Vody	?	(8)
1971	Sudnobudivnyk Mykolaiv	5	(0)
1971	Avanhard Ternopil		(2)
1972	Zvezda Tiraspol		(2)
1973–1975	Lokomotyv Kherson		(7)
1976–1979	Tiraspol		
1980	Khvylia Mykolaiv		

Managerial career
- 1986: Pakhtakor Andijan (staff)
- 1987–1994: FC Artania Ochakiv
- 1994: FC Evis Mykolaiv
- 1998: SC Mykolaiv (assistant)
- 1998–2000: FC Vorskla Poltava (assistant)
- 2004–2006: Inter Baku PIK (assistant)
- * Club domestic league appearances and goals

Valeriy Viktorovych Zhuravko (Ukrainian: Валерій Вікторович Журавко; 5 September 1947 – 23 March 2020) was a Soviet football player and a Ukrainian football coach. A forward during his playing career, he was known as a creator and coach of FC Artania Ochakiv. Valeriy Zhuravko had a younger brother, Oleh, who also used to play and was a coaching staff of FC Artania Ochakiv.
