= Tagir Fasakhov =

Kyrgyzstani footballer

Personal information
- Full name: Tagir Fasakhov
- Date of birth: 16 January 1964
- Place of birth: Frunze, Kyrgyz SSR
- Date of death: 29 March 1996 (aged 32)
- Height: 1.78 m (5 ft 10 in)
- Position: Striker

Senior career*
Years	Team	Apps	(Gls)
1988–1990	Alga Frunze	90	(22)
1991	Alay Osh	17	(7)
1991	APK Azov	14	(5)
1992	Krystal Chortkiv	11	(6)
1992	Nyva Ternopil	16	(1)
1993–1995	Prykarpattya Ivano-Frankivsk	76	(8)
1995	DAG-Liepaya	4	(0)
- * Club domestic league appearances and goals as of 15 May 2010

Tagir Fasakhov (Russian: Тагир Ривкатович Фасахов) (16 January 1964 – 29 March 1996) was a Kyrgyzstani footballer who was a striker for Alga Frunze, Alay Osh, Nyva Ternopil, Prykarpattya Ivano-Frankivsk and DAG-Liepaya. He was killed in road accident in Kazakhstan together with Kyrgyzstani players Ashilbek Momunov and Kanatbek Ishenbaev.
