= Oleksandr Haiduk =

Ukrainian footballer

Oleksandr Haiduk Олександр Гайдук
Personal information
- Full name: Oleksandr Volodymyrovych Haiduk
- Date of birth: 11 May 1972 (age 54)
- Place of birth: Ukrainian SSR, Soviet Union
- Height: 1.80 m (5 ft 11 in)
- Position: Striker

Senior career*
Years	Team	Apps	(Gls)
1990	FC Shakhtar Oleksandriya		
1990–1992	FC Ros Bila Tserkva	108	(19)
1992	→ CSK ZSU Kyiv (loan)		
1993	FC Khimik Severodonetsk	38	(9)
1994	FC Nyva Vinnytsia	16	(4)
1994	FC Obolon-Zmina Kyiv	9	(0)
1995–1996	Maccabi Petah Tikva F.C.	27	(7)
1996–1998	Maccabi Netanya F.C.	52	(24)
1998–1999	Maccabi Ahi Nazareth F.C.		(4)
1999	Al-Rayyan SC		(0)
2000	SV Elversberg	2	(0)
2006	FC Hran Buzova	1	(0)
- * Club domestic league appearances and goals

Oleksandr Haiduk (Ukrainian: Олександр Володимирович Гайдук; born 11 May 1972) is a Ukrainian retired football forward.
