= Hirne, Horlivka Raion, Donetsk Oblast =

Hirne Гірне
- Village
- Location within Donetsk Oblast Location within Ukraine
- Coordinates: 48°02′14″N 38°33′00″E
- Country: Ukraine
- Oblast: Donetsk Oblast
- Municipality: Horlivka Raion

Population
  - Total: 1,409
- Website: Ukrainian Parliament website

Hirne (Ukrainian: Гірне) is a settlement in eastern Ukraine. It is located in the Horlivka Raion of Donetsk Oblast. While de facto in Ukraine, since 2014, the village has been controlled by the unrecognized Donetsk People's Republic.
