= FC Shakhtar Horlivka =

- Full name: FC Shakhtar Horlivka
- Founded: 1913
- Dissolved: 2014
Home colours	Away colours

FC Shakhtar Horlivka (Ukrainian: Шахтар (Горлівка)) was a Ukrainian football club from Horlivka, Donetsk Oblast. Since its relegation from professional leagues in 2000, the club participated in the regional competitions of Donetsk Oblast until the War in Donbas. The club is associated with the coal mining company Artemvuhillya (Artemugol) out of Horlivka.

During the Soviet times, the club participated mostly in the republican competitions of the Soviet Ukraine including the competitions of the Soviet Second League.

== Brief history ==
The club was created back in 1913 as the Football Association of the Gorlovka Artillery Works (FOGAZ). After the World War I and the Russian Civil War, the club was revived and until 1926 competed under its original name. In 1926 it was renamed into FC Metalist Horlivka. In 1928 the club was merged with another club from Horlivka, FC Hirnyk Horlivka, as FC Metalist Horlivka. The same year the club won its regional championship and qualified for the Ukrainian finals that took place in Kharkiv. In the finals FC Metalist placed second after the newly created FC Dynamo Kharkiv (descendant of FC Shturm and FC RabIs).

In 1934-1936 the club played as FC Dynamo Horlivka when 1936 it was merged with Dynamo Stalino into FC Vuhilnyky Horlivka (better known as FC Ugolshchiki Gorlovka) and later participated in the Soviet competitions as Stakhanovets Stalino. In 1938 FC Vuhilnyky Horlivka was revived and participated in the Ukrainian republican competitions until 1959. Sometime after the World War II the club was renamed from FC Avanhard Horlivka to FC Shakhtar Horlivka.

== League and cup history ==
=== Soviet Union ===
Season	Div.	Pos.	Pl.	W	D	L	GS	GA	P	Domestic Cup	Europe	Notes
1987	3rd	10	52	22	13	17	67	58	57			Zone 6
1988	3rd	26	50	8	8	34	37	91	24			Zone 6, Relegated
1989	4th	5	24	12	3	9	28	24	27			Group 6
1990	4th	7	28	11	7	10	30	23	29			Group 6
1991	4th	4	30	13	8	9	41	31	34			Group 6

=== Ukraine ===
Season	Div.	Pos.	Pl.	W	D	L	GS	GA	P	Domestic Cup	Europe	Notes
1992–93	3rd (lower)	13	34	9	8	17	33	44	26			Relegated
1993–94	4th	2	26	17	5	4	36	18	39			Zone 5, Promoted
1994–95	3rd (lower)	18	42	11	3	28	29	73	36			Relegated
1997–98	4th	3	14	9	1	4	20	14	28			Group 4
1997–98	4th	2	4	2	0	2	3	4	6			Group B
1997–98	4th	1	2	2	0	0	2	1	6			Play-off, Promoted
1998–99	3rd	11	26	8	3	15	18	39	27			Group B
1999–00	3rd	13	26	2	5	19	11	13	11			Group B, Relegated

== Honours ==
- Championship of Ukraine
  - Runners-up (3): 1928, 1932 (as Donbas), 1969
- Ukrainian Cup
  - Runner up (1): 1976
