= FC Khartsyzk =

- Founded: unknown
- Dissolved: 1997
- Ground: Stalekanatnyk Stadium, Khartsyzk, Ukraine

FC Khartsyzk, was a Ukrainian football club from Khartsyzk, Donetsk Oblast.

== History ==
The club was founded under the name Hirnyk in the early 20th century as a factory team of the local Steel Wire and Rope Factory. In 1991 the team made its debut at the republican level in the Ukrainian KFK competitions. Following fall of the Soviet Union, it participated in football competitions in Ukraine.

As Hirnyk, it debuted in the Ukrainian third tier on 4 April 1992, visiting More Feodosiya at their home stadium Albatros in Prymorskyi, Crimea. Hirnyk won that game 1:0 and the winning goal was scored by Lytvynov at 33rd minute. Despite the impressive start of two wins in the first two games, Hirnyk hit a streak of 5 losses following it. At the season's finish, Hirnyk placed 7th among 9 teams in its group.

For the next season, the third tier was split, and an extra 4th tier was created. Since Hirnyk finished in the bottom half of the competition table, it was moved to the newly created 4th tier.

== Honours ==
- Druha Liha (3rd tier):
  - 7th place: 1992
- Ukrainian Cup:
  - 1/64 finals: 1993/94
- Ukrainian Amateur League:
  - 3rd place in Group 4: 1994/95
- Ukrainian Amateur Cup:
  - 1/4 finals: 1996/97

== Notable players ==
- Oleksandr Zotov
- Ihor Korol
- Oleksandr Spivak
