= FC Spartak Sumy =

- Full name: FC Spartak Sumy
- Founded: 1999 (1982 as Yavir)
- Dissolved: 2007
- Ground: Yuvileiny Stadium, Sumy
- Capacity: 25,830
Home colours	Away colours

FC Spartak Sumy was a Ukrainian football club based in Sumy.

== History ==
Yavir was established on January 12, 1982, at the village forestry Krasnopillya. In Ukrainian Yavir (Ukrainian: Явір) means Sycamore (Acer pseudoplatanus). The team started playing in the regional championship and after couple of years became the regional champion. The following year it won the regional cup.

In the first national championship of Ukraine Yavir Krasnopillya became involved in the professional leagues, first in the Ukrainian Second League, then in the 1992. In 1995, Yavir Krasnopillya won the second league

Around that time, the established local teams in Sumy – FC Frunzenets Sumy and FC Avtomobilist Sumy suddenly folded and disappeared altogether. As a result of this, the regional leaders decided to revive football in Sumy. With this purpose in 1998, Yavir was transferred to the regional center and renamed Yavir-Sumy. As such, the club lasted half the season, then transformed into FC Sumy, and once more into Spartak Sumy. From 2003, the team was called Spartak-Horobyna Sumy.

In the 2006–07 season they played in the Ukrainian First League. However, the club was withdrawn from the league (and subsequently folded) after missing two Ukrainian First League matches due to financial difficulties.

== Previous names of the club ==
- 1982–1998 – Football Club Yavir Krasnopillya (Ukrainian: Футбольний Клуб «Явір» Краснопілля)
- 1999–2000 – Football Club Yavir-Sumy (Ukrainian: Футбольний Клуб «Явір-Суми»)
- 2000–2001 – Football Club Spartak Sumy (Ukrainian: Футбольний Клуб «Спартак» Суми)
- 2002 – Football Club Sumy (Ukrainian: Футбольний Клуб «Суми»)
- 2003 – Football Club Spartak Sumy (Ukrainian: Футбольний Клуб «Спартак» Суми)
- 2004 – 2005 – Football Club Spartak-Horobyna Sumy (Ukrainian: Футбольний Клуб «Спартак-Горобина» Суми)
- 2005–2006 – Football Club Spartak Sumy (Ukrainian: Футбольний Клуб «Спартак» Суми)

== Stadium ==
Former

Yuvileiny Stadium

Former

Kolos Stadium (3,000)

== Honors ==
- Ukrainian Druha Liha
  - Winners (2): 1994–95, 2001–02 (as FC Sumy)
- Sumy Oblast Football Championship
  - Winners (1): 1984

== League and cup history ==
Season	Div.	Pos.	Pl.	W	D	L	GS	GA	P	Domestic Cup	Europe	Notes
Yavir Krasnopillia
1985	4th	4	14	6	1	7	9	15	13			
1986	4th	2	16	9	3	4	23	23	21			
1987	4th	9	16	3	3	10	17	32	9			
1988	regional competitions											
1989	4th	7	24	9	9	6	35	20	27			
1990	4th	7	30	14	9	7	48	34	37			
1991	4th	2	28	19	5	4	54	21	43			Promoted
1992	3rd "A"	3	16	8	4	4	21	19	20	Domestic Cup		
1992	3rd "A"	3	16	8	4	4	21	19	20	Did not enter		
1992–93	3rd	3	34	17	7	10	42	27	41	1/16 finals		
1993–94	3rd	5	42	22	10	10	63	35	54	1/32 finals		
1994–95	3rd	1	42	29	6	7	71	30	93	1/16 finals		Promoted
1995–96	2nd	13	42	17	9	16	53	43	60	1/8 finals		
1996–97	2nd	13	46	18	7	21	61	61	61	1/16 finals		
1997–98	2nd	10	42	19	5	18	52	48	62	1/16 finals		
Yavir-Sumy
1998–99	2nd	13	38	15	7	16	36	42	52	1/32 finals		
1999–2000	2nd	9	34	14	6	14	42	45	48	1/16 finals		
FC Sumy
2000–2001	2nd	17	34	8	7	19	20	46	31	1/4 finals		Relegated
2001–2002	3rd "C"	1	34	24	5	5	68	34	77	2nd round		Promoted
Spartak Sumy
2002–03	2nd	10	34	13	6	15	34	40	45	1/16 finals		
Spartak-Horobyna
2003–04	2nd	9	34	11	13	10	40	41	46	1/16 finals		
2004–05	2nd	15	34	9	12	13	34	41	39	1/16 finals		
Spartak Sumy
2005–06	2nd	17	34	5	5	23	28	68	20	1/16 finals		Avoided Relegation
2006–07	2nd	20	19	1	0	18	4	49	0	1/32 finals		Withdrawn

== See also ==
- FC Yavir Krasnopilya
- FC Avtomobilist Sumy
- FC Frunzenets Sumy
