= FC Antratsyt Kirovske =

Football club from Kirovske, Ukraine

FC Antratsyt Kirovske (Ukrainian: ФК Антрацит Кіровське) was a football club from Kirovske, Ukraine. In 1992 and 1992–93 it participated in professional competitions of lower leagues. After 1993 Antratsyt withdrew from competitions.

== Brief overview ==
The team was created in 1988 and entered football competitions of Donetsk Oblast as one of football teams of the Oktyabrugol Mining Association. The team was created on initiative of the mining association general director V. Khamulyak and the president of the local Mining Industry Trade Union V. Moskalenko. The team made its debut in regional competitions at second tier (the lowest) competing against 19 other teams and won it. The next season in 1989 it competed at the top tier and placed third behind Kirovets Makiivka and Shakhtar Selidove.

In 1990 and 1991 Antratsyt played at the Ukrainian republican competitions. In 1991 the team won its group but placed last at the final stage.

In 1992 the team was admitted to the Ukrainian Transitional League where it played 2 seasons. In 1993 the team was dissolved.

In 2008 the club was revived and played at regional level only.

== League and cup history ==
Soviet Union (Ukrainian SSR)

| Season | Div. | Pos. | Pl. | W | D | L | GS | GA | P | Domestic Cup | Europe | Notes |
|---|---|---|---|---|---|---|---|---|---|---|---|---|
| 1990 | 4th | 6 | 30 | 15 | 6 | 9 | 34 | 30 | 36 | N/A | | |
| 1991 | 4th | 1 | 30 | 24 | 5 | 1 | 64 | 20 | 53 | N/A | | |
| 1991 | 4th | 6 | 5 | 0 | 0 | 5 | 4 | 10 | 0 | N/A | | |

Ukraine

| Season | Div. | Pos. | Pl. | W | D | L | GS | GA | P | Domestic Cup | Europe | Notes |
|---|---|---|---|---|---|---|---|---|---|---|---|---|
| 1992 | 3rd "B" | 8 | 16 | 2 | 3 | 11 | 15 | 32 | 7 | N/A | | Relegated |
| 1992–93 | 3rd (lower) | 3 | 34 | 22 | 5 | 7 | 46 | 32 | 49 | N/A | | Withdrew as Hirnyk Hirne (first half) |

== Managers ==
- 1992 Anatoliy Molotay
- 1993 Oleksiy Varnavsky
