= FC More Feodosia =

FC More Feodosia (Ukrainian: ФК Море Феодосія; Futbol′nyy klub More Feodosia) was a football club from Feodosia, Ukraine.

The club existed before transfer of Crimea as FC More Yuzhnaya Tochka. Sometimes in 1952 it moved to a town of Prymorskyi where it played until 1989. Just before dissolution of the Soviet Union, it moved to the main city of Feodosia in 1989 and in 1992 was admitted to the 1992 Ukrainian Transitional League. The club was not successful and soon was relegated to regional competitions in 1993. Sometimes after that it was dissolved.

In 1992 and 1992–93 it participated in semi-professional competitions of Ukrainian league competitions. After 1993 More withdrew from competitions. Its games the club played in Prymorsky, Feodosia municipal commune.

The club was overshadowed after 1995 by another club FC Kafa that existed in 1995-2008 and competed at the Crimea regional competitions.

== League and cup history ==
=== Soviet Union ===
Season	Div.	Pos.	Pl.	W	D	L	GS	GA	P	Domestic Cup	Europe	Notes
1989	4th KFK Ukrainian SSR Gr. 4	4_{/13}	24	13	5	6	30	15	31			Reorganization of competitions
1990	5th KFK Ukrainian SSR Gr. 5	3_{/16}	30	20	7	3	43	12	47			
1991	5th KFK Ukrainian SSR Gr. 4	3_{/16}	30	18	8	4	53	20	44			Reorganization of competitions

=== Ukraine ===
Season	Div.	Pos.	Pl.	W	D	L	GS	GA	P	Domestic Cup	Europe	Notes
1992	3rd Transitional League Gr. B	9_{/9}	16	1	3	12	2	25	5			Reorganization of competitions
1992-93	4th Transitional League	17_{/18}	34	7	8	19	19	39	22			Relegated
1993-94	5th Amateur League Gr. 6	15_{/17}	32	10	2	20	26	14	22			Withdrew
