= FC Krystal Chortkiv =

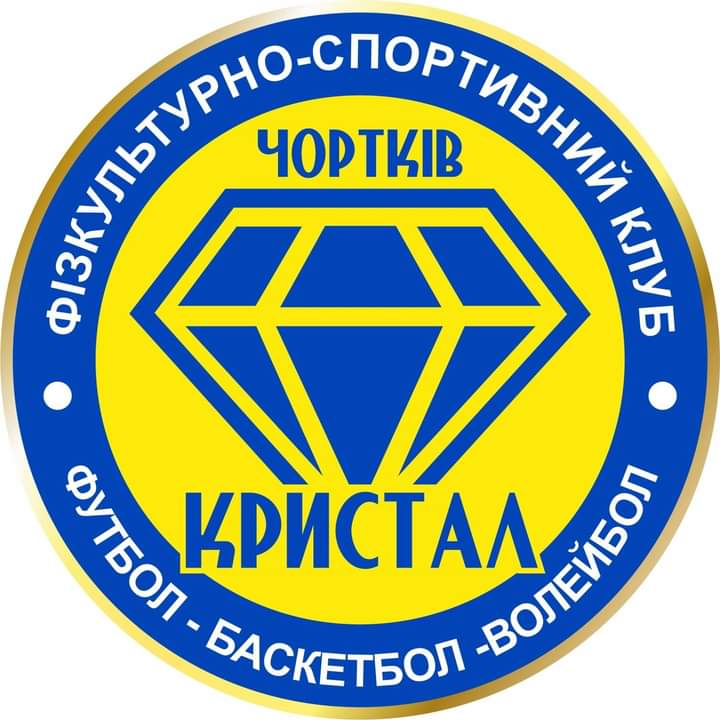
- Full name: FC Krystal Chortkiv
- Founded: 1946 (as Dynamo); 1980s (as Tsukrovyk); 2016 (as Chortkiv-Peduniversytet)
- Dissolved: 19?? 1998
- Ground: Kharchovyk Stadium
- 1998–99: 14th
Home colours	Away colours

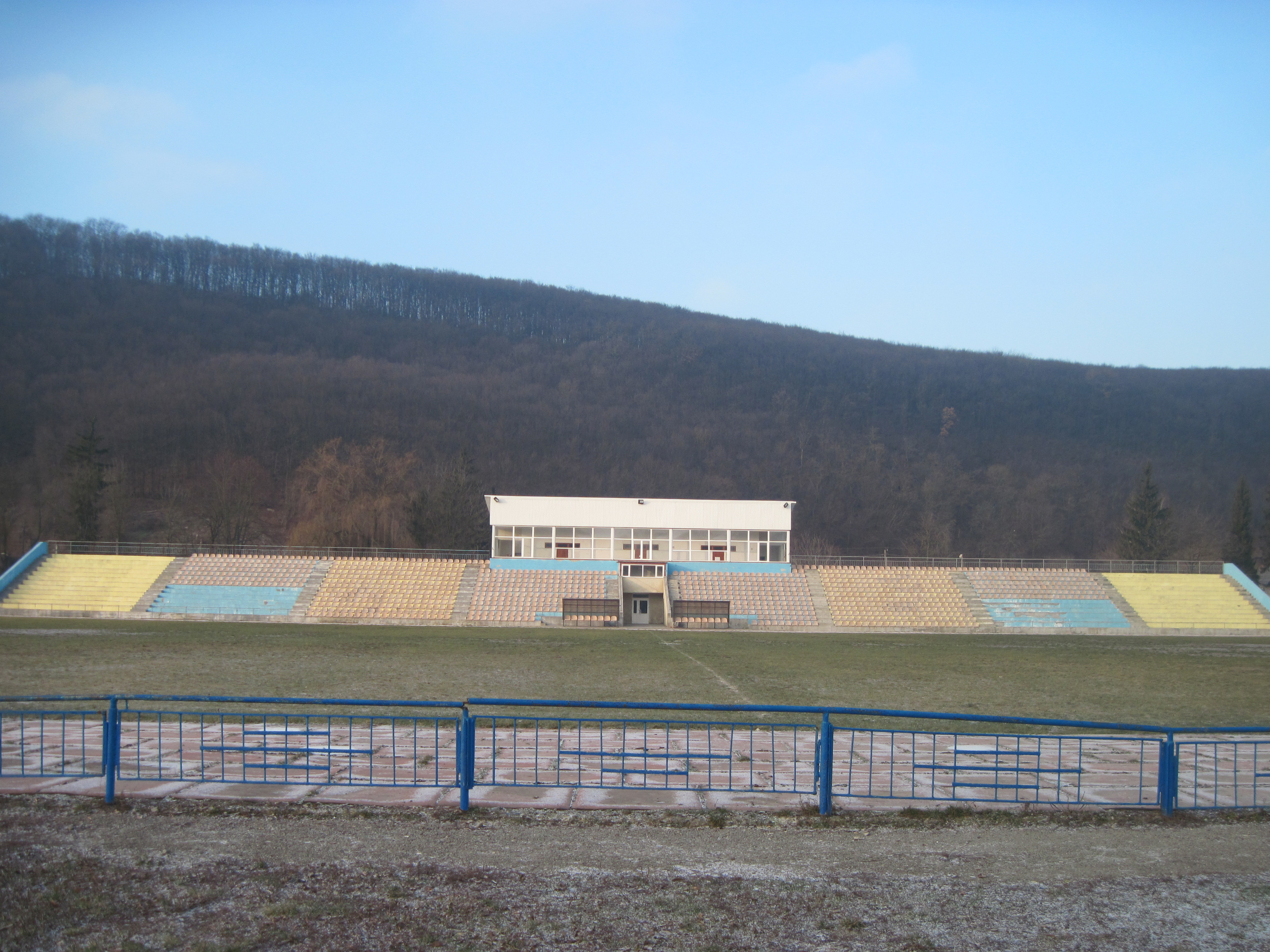
Stadion Kharchovyk in Chortkiv

FC Krystal Chortkiv is a Ukrainian football team. The team is located in Chortkiv, Ukraine. It participates in the regional championships in Ternopil Oblast.

In 2016 it merged with a student team FC Ternopil-Peduniversytet into FC Chortkiv-Peduniversytet.

== History ==
- 1946: Founded as FC Dynamo Chortkiv
- 1986: Renamed FC Tsukrovyk Chortkiv
- 1990: Renamed FC Krystal Chortkiv
- 1999: Renamed FC Avianosets Chortkiv
- 2005: Renamed FC Chortkiv
- 2016: Renamed FC Chortkiv-Peduniversytet
- 2017: Renamed FSC Krystal Chortkiv'

== Honours ==
- Football Championship of Ternopil Oblast
  - Winners (7): 1955, 1959 (both as FC Chortkiv), 1964 (Druzhba), 1989 (Tsukrovyk), 2002, 2003 (both as Avianosets), 2013 (FC Chortkiv)

== League and cup history ==
Season	Division	Pos	P	W	D	L	F	A	Pts	Domestic Cup	Others	Notes
Tsukrovyk Chortkiv
1986	4th "1"	4	16	8	3	5	12	12	19			
1987	4th "2"	2	14	7	3	4	22	16	17			
1988	4th "1"	5	18	8	2	8	24	26	18			
1989	4th "1"	1	22	16	3	3	33	13	35			
1989	4th "1"	3	5	2	2	1	10	7	6			
Krystal Chortkiv
1990	4th "1"	2	28	22	3	3	62	13	47			
1991	4th "1"	1	30	24	5	1	85	12	53			Final group
1991	4th "1"	2	5	3	2	0	8	4	8			Joined Ukrainian championship
1992	2nd "A"	5	26	11	7	8	34	26	29			
1992–93	2nd	14	42	14	9	19	37	61	37			
1993–94	2nd	17	38	10	9	19	29	41	29			
1994–95	2nd	18	42	12	9	21	35	67	45			
1995–96	2nd	10	42	19	6	17	70	54	63			
1996–97	2nd	24	46	9	6	31	31	77	33			Relegated
1997–98	3rd "A"	5	34	13	12	9	48	38	51			
1998–99	3rd "A"	14	28	5	1	22	14	18	10			–6; withdrew
1999–2016	regional competitions											
Chortkiv-Peduniversytet
2016–17	4th "1"	11	20	3	3	14	17	54	12			
Krystal Chortkiv
2017–18	4th "1"	9	16	2	2	12	9	43	8			
2018–19	4th "1"											

== See also ==
- FC Nyva Ternopil
- FC Ternopil
