= FC Avanhard Zhydachiv =

FC Avanhard Zhydachiv was an amateur Ukrainian football club from Zhydachiv, Lviv Oblast.

== League and cup history ==
Season	Div.	Pos.	Pl.	W	D	L	GS	GA	P	Domestic Cup	Europe	Notes
1992–93	3rd "lower"	8	34	13	10	11	41	32	36			
1993–94	3rd "lower"	10	34	12	9	13	38	44	33			
1994–95	3rd "lower"	16	42	14	9	19	42	65	51			
1995–96	3rd	11	40	18	8	14	44	44	62			withdrew

== See also ==
- FC Medyk Morshyn
- FC Skala Morshyn
