= Prymorskyi =

Coordinates: 45°07′00″N 35°28′50″E

- Flag Coat of arms
- Interactive map of Prymorskyi
- Republic: Crimea
- Municipality: Feodosia Municipality

Population (2014)
  - Total: 12,560
- Time zone: UTC+4 (MSK)
- Climate: Cfa

Prymorskyi (Crimean Tatar: Hafuz; Russian: Приморский; Ukrainian: Приморський) is an urban-type settlement in the Feodosia Municipality, a territory recognized by the majority of countries as part of Ukraine (as the Autonomous Republic of Crimea), but in control of and annexed into Russia since 2014. Population: 12,560 (2014 Census).

It is located at the easternmost part of the Crimean Southern coast, before a shoreline transitions into the Kerch Peninsula. It is also near the narrowest place in Crimea between the Black Sea and the Sea of Azov. At Prymorskyi, the shoreline curves, creating a bay-like feature between the Elijah Cape in Feodosia and the Salar Cape on the southern side of the Kerch peninsula.

== History ==
In 1938, near the villages of Dalni Komyshi (Uzaq Qamış) and Hafuz, construction of a shipyard began, and a new populated place, Yuzhnaya Tochka (PO More Shipyard), was established for the shipyard builders.

After World War II, in 1952, Hafuz and Yuzhnaya Tochka were merged into a single populated place, the urban-type settlement Prymorskyi. Sometime before 1954, Dalni Komyshi was also merged into the newly formed place.

== Shipyard "More" ==
A government-owned manufacturer of small watercraft. It is part of a bigger naval repair and manufacturing complex, some facilities of which are located in Feodosia.

== Sports and culture ==
- The settlement has a stadium, where the local shipyard football team used to play. The stadium also houses a local sports school.
- The settlement has a cultural center, Palace of Culture Bryz (Breeze).
- At least since 1955, there has been a vocational school for seacraft mechanics.
- In 2001, the Feodosia Politechnical Institute was established.

== Notable people ==
- Serhiy Siminin (born 1987), Ukrainian football player

== Gallery ==
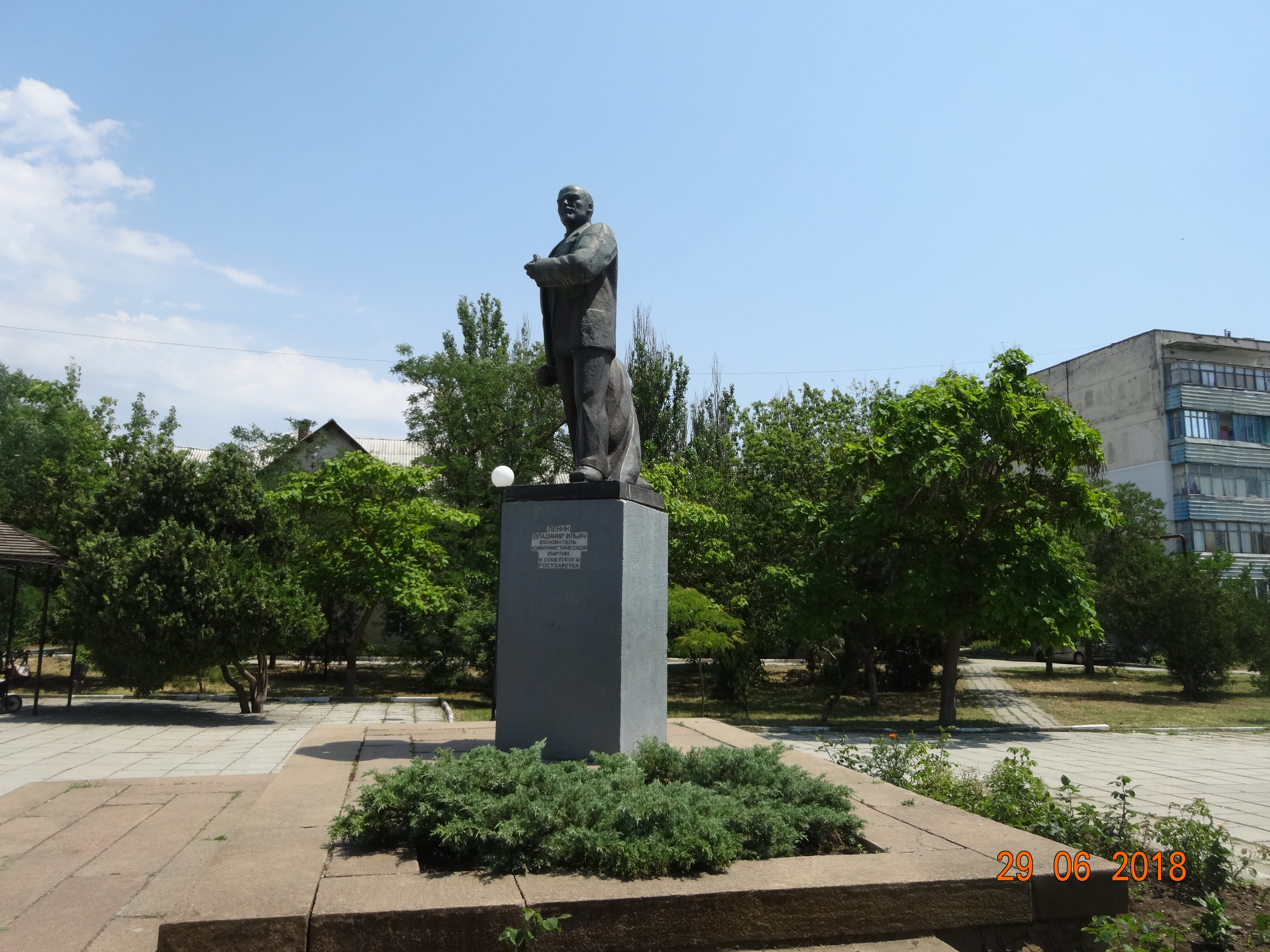
The main monument created in 1966

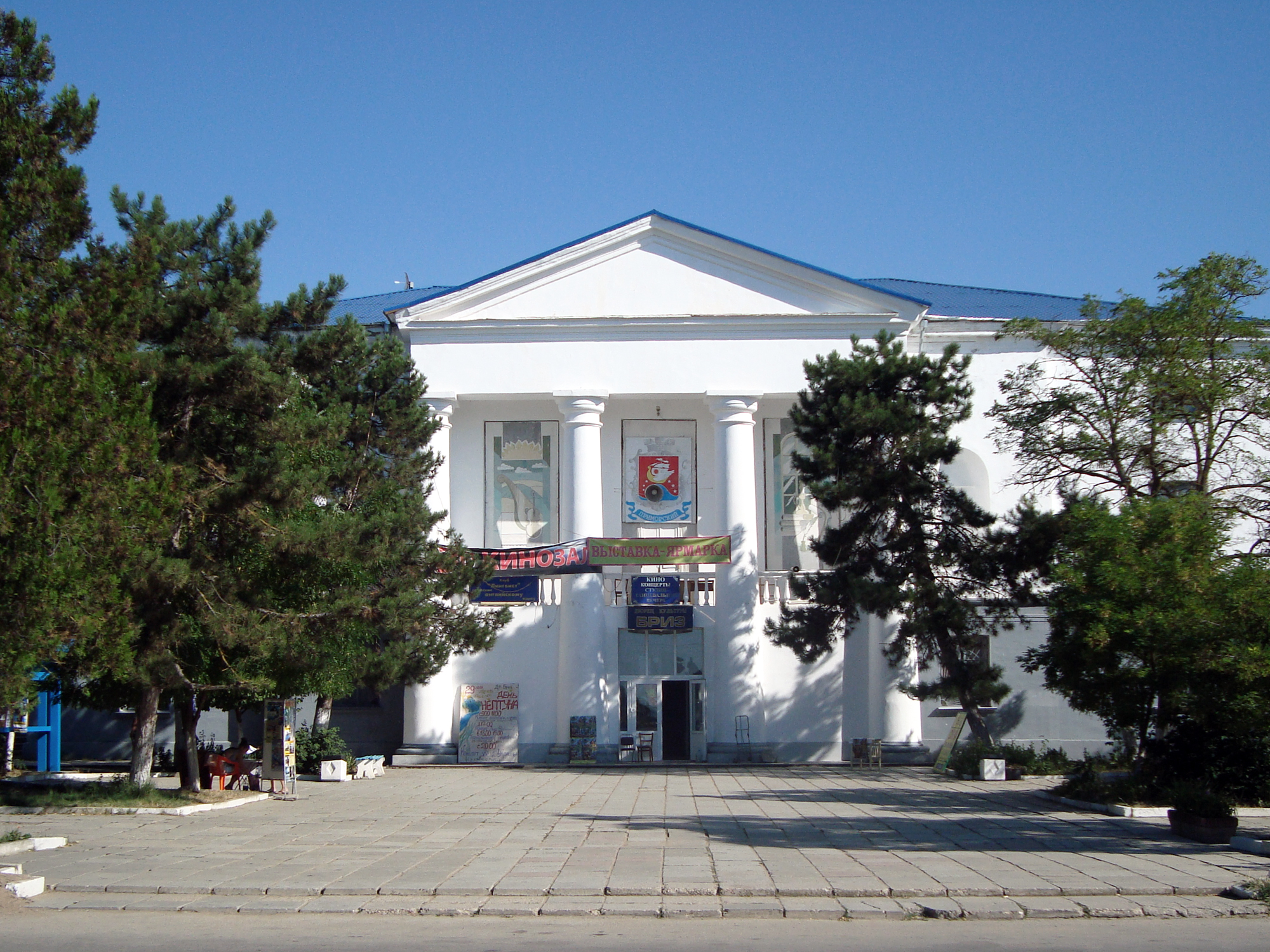
Bryz Palace of Culture

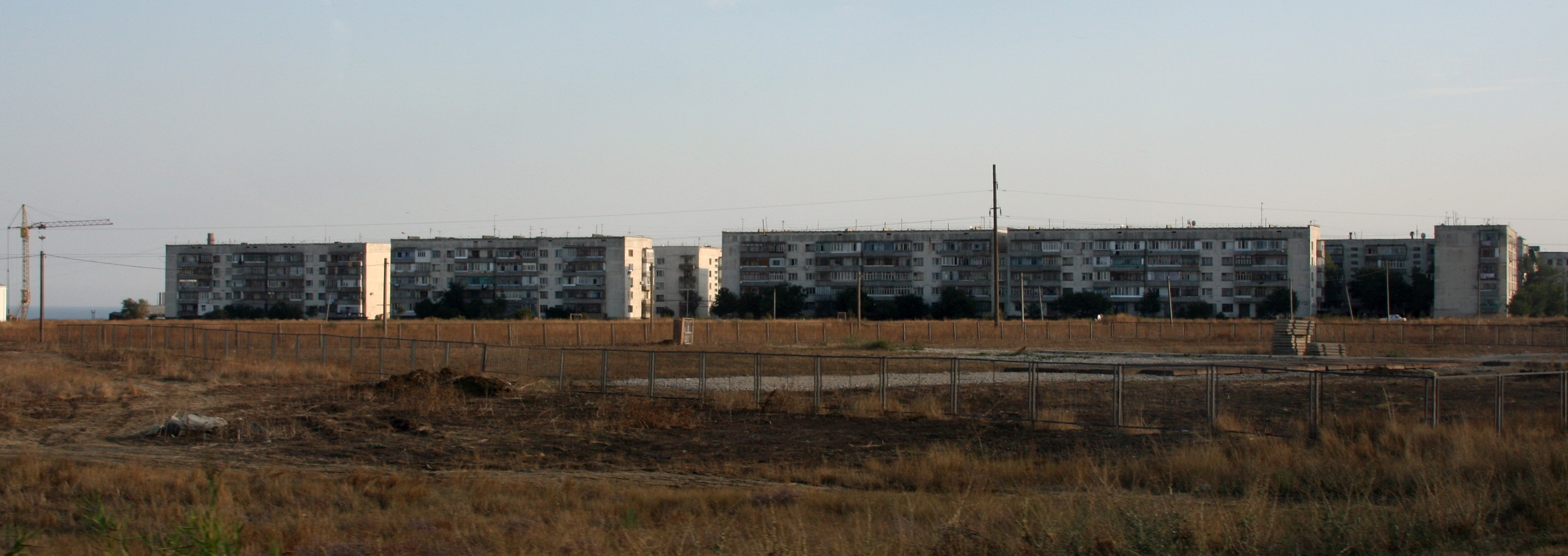
Apartment blocks seen from the main highway, near a shoreline

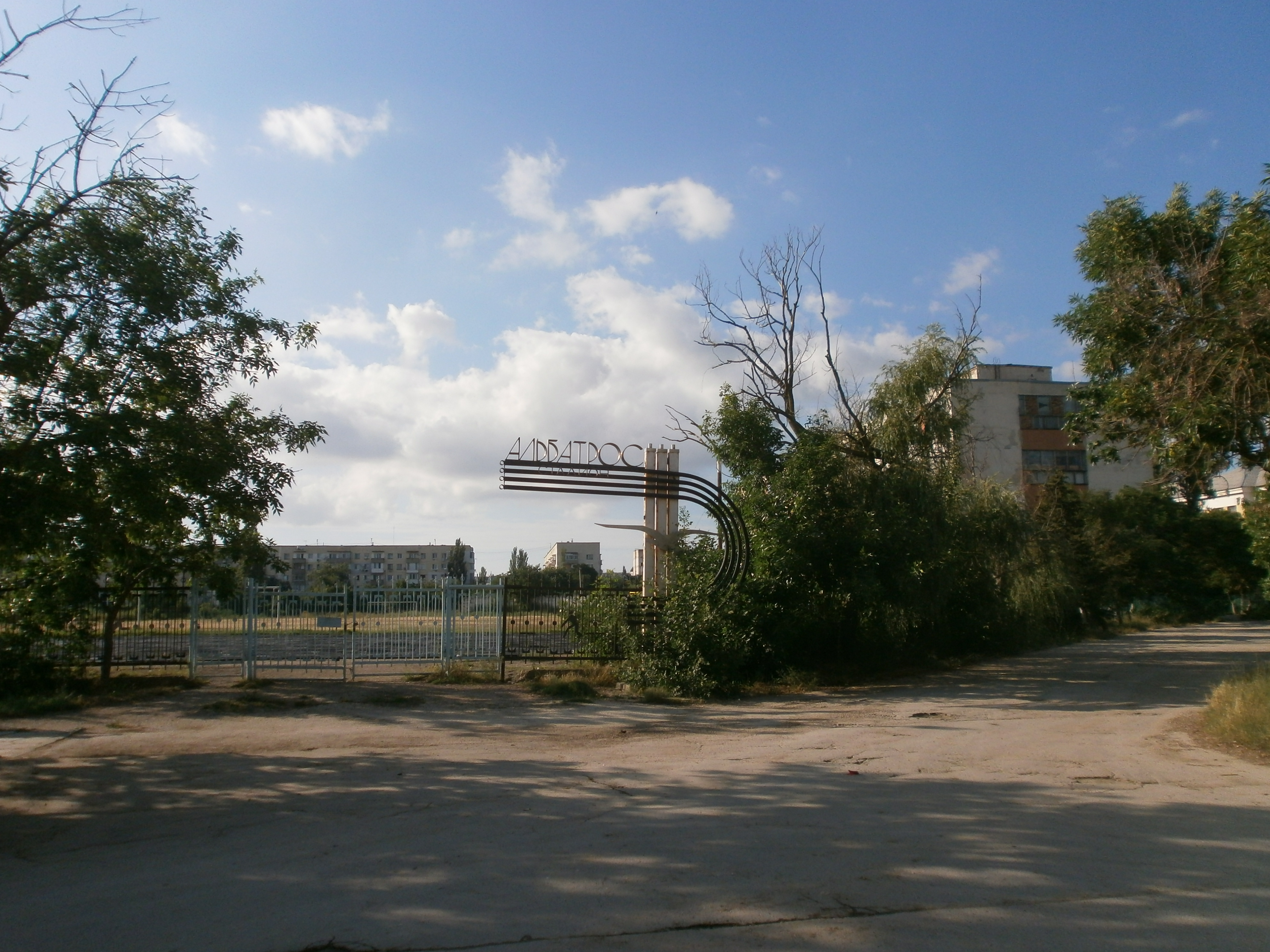
Albatros Stadium

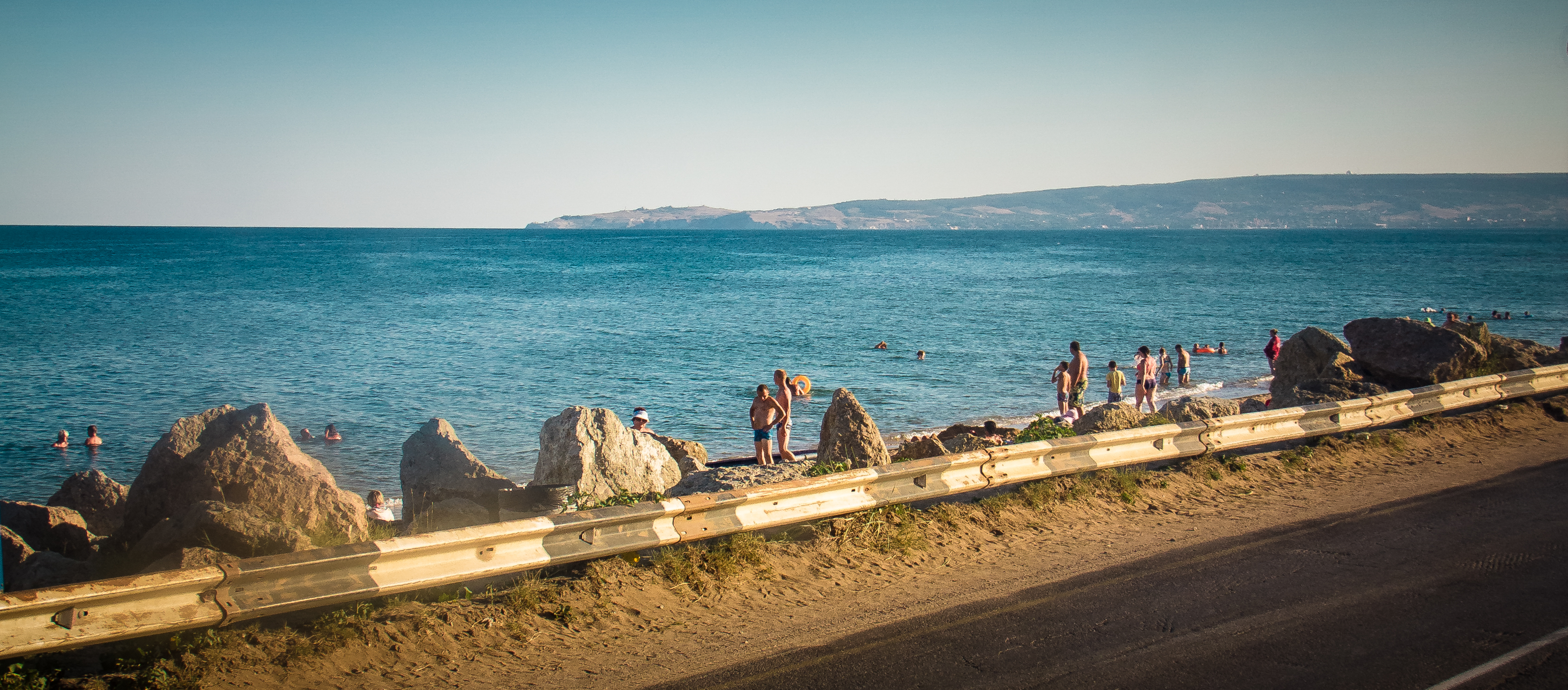
Beaches in Prymorskyi
