= FC Shakhtar Shakhtarsk =

Shakhtar Shakhtarsk
- Full name: FC Shakhtar Shakhtarsk
- Founded: 1984/1996
- League: Ukrainian Amateur League
| Home colours | Away colours |

FC Shakhtar Shakhtarsk is a Ukrainian amateur football club from Shakhtarsk, Ukraine. In 1996, the main squad was transformed to FC Metalurh Donetsk and moved to Donetsk. After that, the club continued to play at an amateur level.

== History ==
Initially, FC Shakhtar Shakhtarsk was founded in 1984 at the State Production Association "Shakhtarskantratsyt" from the local miners' football teams of Vinnytska Mine and Postnykivska Mine. Until 1989, it competed at regional competitions, and then, after changing its name to Prometei, it entered the Ukrainian amateur competitions, where it competed until 1991. Prometei Shakhtarsk placed second in their group. In 1992, the club was admitted to the Ukrainian Transitional League (third division) from which it was relegated after the first season. In December of 1992, it was registered as the Khozraschet Football Club Prometei belonging to the Shakhtarskvuhillia mining company. In 1992–93, Prometei, despite finishing sixth, earned promotion to the Second League after FC Antratsyt Kirovske withdrew from competitions. In 1994, the club changed its name to Medita Shakhtarsk after its main sponsor, "Medita" (a local private clinic). In 1995, the club changed its name again to Shakhtar after it was returned under the sponsorship of the Shakhtarskantratsyt.

=== Reorganization ===
In 1996, based on the senior squad of Shakhtar, a new club,Metalurh Donetsk was created, which became based in Donetsk. The youth squad of Shakhtar Shakhtarsk joined the youth academy of Shakhtar Donetsk, while other players who were not suited for the club formed a new team, FC Fortuna Shakhtarsk and until 1999 were playing in Kontarne, a suburban urban-type settlement of Shakhtarsk.

=== Amateur period ===
In 2000, Fortuna competed in Ukrainian amateur competitions. Next year, the club changed its name again to FC Avanhard Shakhtarsk under which it competed until 2011. From 2012, the team competes under the name Ajax.

== Honours ==
- Druha Liha:
  - 7th place: 1994/95
- Ukrainian Cup:
  - 1/16 finals: 1994/95

== Naming History ==
- 1984—1989: Shakhtar Shakhtarsk (ukr. «Шахтар» Шахтарськ)
- 1990—1993: Prometei Shakhtarsk (ukr. «Прометей» Шахтарськ)
- 1993—1995: Medita Shakhtarsk (ukr. «Медіта» Шахтарськ)
- 1995—1996: Shakhtar Shakhtarsk (ukr. «Шахтар» Шахтарськ), in its base was created FC Metalurh Donetsk
- 1997—2001: Fortuna Kontarne (ukr. «Фортуна» Контарне), in 1999 returned to Shakhtarsk
- 2001—2009: Avanhard Stizhkivske (ukr. «Авангард» Стiжкiвське), in 2009 returned to Shakhtarsk
- 2011—2012: FC Shakhtarsk (ukr. ФК «Шахтарськ»)
- 2012—present: Ayaks Shakhtarsk (ukr. «Аякс» Шахтарськ)

Notes;

- Both Kontarne and Stizhkivske are part of Shakhtarsk city municipality.

== League and cup history ==
| Season | Div. | Pos. | Pl. | W | D | L | GS | GA | P | Domestic Cup | Europe | Notes |
|---|---|---|---|---|---|---|---|---|---|---|---|---|
| 1991 | 4th | 2 | 30 | 22 | 4 | 4 | 69 | 17 | 48 | N/A | | as Prometei Shakhtarsk |
| 1992 | 3rd | 8 | 16 | 8 | 4 | 4 | 27 | 10 | 20 | N/A | | Relegated as Prometei Shakhtarsk |
| 1992–93 | 3rd "B" | 6 | 34 | 13 | 16 | 5 | 43 | 21 | 42 | N/A | | Promoted as Prometei Shakhtarsk |
| 1993–94 | 3rd | 8 | 42 | 18 | 6 | 18 | 50 | 41 | 42 | N/A | | as Medita Shakhtarsk |
| 1994–95 | 3rd | 7 | 42 | 22 | 8 | 12 | 57 | 36 | 74 | 1/16 finals | | as Medita Shakhtarsk |
| 1995–96 | 3rd | 2 | 38 | 24 | 7 | 7 | 53 | 27 | 94 | Q2 round | | (in second half as Metalurh Donetsk) |
| 2000 | 4th | 4 | 8 | 2 | 1 | 5 | 13 | 16 | 7 | N/A | | Group 8 as Fortuna Shakhtarsk |
