= FC Prometei Dniprodzerzhynsk =

FC Prometei Dniprodzerzhynsk was a Ukrainian football club from Kamianske, Dnipropetrovsk Oblast. The club founded in 1991. In 1947–70 there was another city club SC Prometei Dniprodzerzhynsk.

The club was founded in March 1991 by the city authorities and the Kamianske Industrial Institute. The club was based on the youth team "Burevisnyk" of the city sports school. The new club replaced another Kamianske club "Radyst". After few seasons in the Ukrainian competitions the club went bankrupt and folded in 1996.

== League and cup history ==
=== Soviet Union ===
Season	Div.	Pos.	Pl.	W	D	L	GS	GA	P	Soviet Cup	Europe	Notes
1991	5	6										

=== Ukraine ===
Season	Div.	Pos.	Pl.	W	D	L	GS	GA	P	Domestic Cup	Europe	Notes
1992–93	4	18	34	4	9	21	26	68	17	not played		Relegated
1993–94	5	5	28	15	4	9	26	28	34	not played		Group 4
1994–95	5	11	30	12	4	14	39	48	40	not played		Group 5 – Promoted
1995–96	3	20	38	1	1	38	10	81	4	preliminary		Group B – Withdrew

== See also ==
- SC Prometei Dniprodzerzhynsk
- FC Stal Kamianske
