= FC Karpaty Mukacheve =

- Full name: Football Club Karpaty Mukacheve
- Founded: 1946
- Dissolved: 2003
- Ground: Avanhard
- Capacity: 3,000
Home colours	Away colours

FC Karpaty Mukacheve (Ukrainian: ФК «Карпати» Мукачеве) was a Ukrainian football team from Mukacheve, Zakarpattia Oblast. The club was formed in 1946 as FC Bilshovyk.

== History ==
Looking back throughout the history, in the city existed several football clubs that preceded current club. After the Second World War in 1945 in Mukacheve, were formed three football teams "Spartak" (represented a local tobacco factory), "Bilshovyk" (brewery), and "Dynamo" (law enforcement and border guards). On 13 May 1945, the local newspaper "Zakarpatska Pravda" was reporting its readers that the local Mukacheve Dynamo had hosted "Spartak-URSO" from Uzhhorod and beat it 10–1. Sometime a week later, the same Dynamo Mukacheve beat Dynamo Berehove at home 5–2. Soon the chairman of the People's Council of Transcarpathian Ukraine Ivan Turyanytsia received an official invitation to send an athletic team of Zakarpattia of about 150 athletes to the Ukrainian Spartakiad that had been scheduled to take place 23 August to 6 September 1945.

In 1947, all three football teams were merged into one and named as Bilshovyk Mukacheve.

In Soviet competitions, it participated rarely and with extensive pauses: 1948, 1949, 1968–1970, 1990. Based out of Mukacheve, Zakarpattia took part in the Ukrainian First League from its first championship in 1992. They were later sent down to Druha Liha after the 1996–97 season, and in couple of years folded.

In 1999 and 2000, a team named FC Mukachevo takes part in the regional championship. In 2001, the club takes part in the regional cup. In 2002, FC Mukachevo took part in the Ukrainian Football Cup among amateurs. After a two-year break, in 2003, already as Karpaty, the club started for the last time in the championship of the Transcarpathian region.

== Team Names ==
- 1946–1951: Bilshovyk
- 1951: Iskra
- 1955: Burevisnyk
- 1962: Tochprylad
- 1963: Mukachevprylad
- 1964: Prylad
- 1965–1966: Pryladyst
- 1967: Prylad
- 1968–1970: Karpaty
- 1971–1993: Pryladyst
- 1994–1998: Karpaty
- 1999–2002: FK Mukacheve
- 2003: Karpaty

== Honors ==
=== Soviet Union ===
- Football Championship of the Ukrainian SSR
- Winners (1): 1947 (Bilshovyk)
- Ukrainian republican championship among KFK
- Winners (1): 1977 (Pryladyst)
- Runners-up (1): 1971 (Karpaty)
- Zakarpattia Oblast championship
- Winners (2): 1962, 1988
- Runners-up (2): 1966, 1967
- Zakarpattia Oblast Cup
- Winners (2): 1963, 1964, 1966

=== Ukraine ===
- Ukrainian First League
- Runners-up (1): 1992 (group)
- Zakarpattia Oblast championship

== League and cup history ==
Soviet Union (Zone "Ukraine", Group 1, or Group 4)

Season	Div.	Pos.	Pl.	W	D	L	GS	GA	P	Domestic Cup	Europe	Notes
1948	2nd "Group B"	1	14	10	2	2	35	16	22			quilified for the Republican finals
1948	Playoff	4	3	0	0	3	1	6	0			
1949	2nd	5	34	21	5	8	72	38	47	3rd round		withdrew to regional competition
1968	3rd	14	42	14	11	17	36	47	39	Fifth round (1/256)		four games in the Soviet Cup record +2=1–1 3–2
1969	3rd	3	40	18	15	7	50	23	51	?		qualified for finals in Ivano-Frankivsk
1969	Playoff	4	5	2	1	2	6	5	5	?		
1970	4th	5	40	19	13	8	51	36	51			withdrew to regional competition
1991	4th	5	50	24	14	12	67	42	62	?		placed in the Ukrainian First League

Ukraine

Season	Div.	Pos.	Pl.	W	D	L	GS	GA	P	Domestic Cup	Europe	Notes
1992	2nd "Group 1"	2	26	14	5	7	27	15	33	First round (1/32)		
1992–93	2nd	20	42	12	11	19	38	53	35	?		
1993–94	2nd	15	38	12	7	19	41	57	31			
1994–95	2nd	21	42	12	5	25	39	74	41	?		Relegated
1995–96	3rd	5	30	15	7	8	43	24	52	?		
1996–97	3rd	5	34	14	9	11	40	32	51	?		Folded

== Coaches ==
- 1968–1968 Vasyl Zubak
- 1970–1970 Fedir Vanzel
- 1977–1977 Fedir Vanzel
- 1991–1991 Mykola Tellinher
- 1992–1992 Vilhelm Tellinher
- 1992–1993 Ishtvan Sekech
- 1993–1993 Hryhoriy Ishchenko
- 1994–1995 Gabor Kachur
- 1996–1997 Tiberiy Korponay
- 1997–1997 Stefan Voitko
- 1997–1997 Vasyl Turyanchyk
- 1997–1998 Roman Pokora

== See also ==
- FC Zakarpattia Uzhhorod
- FC Fetrovyk Khust
