= FC Rus Khust =

FC Fetrovyk Khust is a Ukrainian amateur football club from Khust, Zakarpattia Oblast. The club used to be named as Andezyt. The club used to be one of the three clubs of this region that entered the Ukrainian competitions at the time of their establishment. The club soon thereafter was relegated.

== Honours ==
- Zakarpattia Oblast Football Championship
  - Winners (7): 1959, 1960, 1964, 1965, 1968, 1982, 1987

== League and cup history ==
Season	Div.	Pos.	Pl.	W	D	L	GS	GA	P	Domestic Cup	Europe	Notes
1992	3rd	5	16	7	4	5	23	22	18			Relegated
1992–93	4th	12	34	13	2	19	29	35	28			
1993–94	4th	12	34	13	5	16	33	49	31			
1994–95	4th	21	42	6	3	33	18	35	21	Q3 round		Relegated

== See also ==
- FC Karpaty Mukacheve
