= FC Elektron Romny =

Ukrainian football club

FC Elektron Romny was a Ukrainian football club from Romny, Sumy Oblast.

The club played in the Ukrainian Second League from 1997 to 2004.

== Honours ==
- Sumy Oblast Football Championship
  - Winners (1): 1995–96

== League and cup history ==
| Season | Div. | Pos. | Pl. | W | D | L | GS | GA | P | Domestic Cup | Europe | Notes |
