= 1994–95 Ukrainian First League =

Ukrainian First League
- Season: 1994–95
- Champions: Zirka-NIBAS Kirovohrad
- Promoted: Zirka-NIBAS, CSKA-Borysfen
- Relegated: Karpaty, Sumy
- Top goalscorer: (21) Andriy Husyn (Dynamo-2 Kyiv)
- Biggest home win: (8:1) Metalurh Nk - Sumy
- Biggest away win: (0:6) Sumy - Khimik Zh
- Highest scoring: (8:1) Metalurh Nk - Sumy

1994–95 Ukrainian First League was the fourth season of the Ukrainian First League which was won by Zirka-NIBAS Kirovohrad. The season started on August 6, 1994, and finished on July 2, 1995. In the last round the Kyiv club was only a point away and was visiting Oleksandriya, while the leading Zirka was hosting the former Premier League participant Bukovyna. The Kirovohrad club has managed to prevail with goals from Borysenko and Oliynyk becoming the season champions.

== Promotion and relegation ==
=== Promoted teams ===
Four clubs promoted from the 1993–94 Ukrainian Second League.

- FC Boryspil – champion (debut)
- FC Bazhanovets Makaiivka – 2nd place (debut)
- FC Zirka-NIBAS Kirovohrad – 3rd place (debut)
- FC Naftokhimik Kremenchuk – 4th place (debut)

=== Relegated teams ===
Two clubs were relegated from the 1993-94 Ukrainian Top League:

- FC Bukovyna Chernivtsi – 17th place (debut)
- FC Metalist Kharkiv – 18th place (debut)

=== Renamed teams ===
- FC Nord-Am-Podillya Khmelnytskyi was renamed back to FC Podillya Khmelnytskyi at the start of season
- FC Boryspil was renamed to FC Borysfen Boryspil at the start of season
- FC SBTS Sumy was renamed to FC Sumy at winter break
- FC Borysfen Boryspil was renamed to FC CSKA-Borysfen Kyiv at winter break

=== Teams ===
In 1994-95 season, the Ukrainian First League consists of the following teams:

Locations of teams in First League

Club	City	Stadium	Coach	Replaced coach(es)
Metalist Kharkiv	Kharkiv	Metalist Stadium	Viktor Kamarzayev	
Pryladyst Mukacheve	Mukacheve	Pryladyst Stadium; Avanhard Stadium (13th and 2nd half); Spartak Stadium (25th and 26th)	Havrylo Kachur	
Polihraftekhnika Oleksandria	Oleksandriya	Olimp Stadium	Anatoliy Buznik	Yuriy Koval
Podillya Khmelnytskyi	Khmelnytskyi; Krasyliv	Podillya Stadium; Yunist Stadium (41st)	Volodymyr Stryzhevskyi	Mykhailo Dunets
Krystal Chortkiv	Chortkiv	Kharchovyk Stadium; Krystal Stadium (30th, 37th)	Ivan Hamaliy	
CSKA-Borysfen Kyiv	Boryspil; Kyiv	Kolos Stadium; CSKA Stadium (2nd half)	Mykhailo Fomenko	Volodymyr Bezsonov
Dynamo-2 Kyiv	Kyiv; Boryspil	Dynamo Stadium; Kolos Stadium (43rd, 44th)	Anatoliy Kroshchenko	Volodymyr Onyshchenko
FC Sumy	Sumy	Avanhard Stadium; Kolos Stadium (23rd, 24th, 27th, 28th, 31st, 32nd)	Sergei Dotsenko	Viktor Aristov
Stal Alchevsk	Alchevsk	Stal Stadium	Anatoliy Volobuyev	
Dnipro Cherkasy	Cherkasy	Central Stadium	Semen Osynovskyi	
Bazhanovets Makiivka	Makiivka	Avanhard Stadium; Shakhtar Stadium (23rd and 24th); SHP (26th, 29th, 30th)	Viktor Pyshchev	
Bukovyna Chernivtsi	Chernivtsi	Bukovyna Stadium	Yukhym Shkolnykov	Oleksandr Pavlenko; Yuriy Stasyshyn
Khimik Zhytomyr	Zhytomyr	Khimik Stadium	Andriy Cheremysin	Leonid Koltun
Naftovyk Okhtyrka	Okhtyrka	Naftovyk Stadium	Andriy Biba	
Metalurh Nikopol	Nikopol	Elektrometalurh Stadium	Pavlo Yakovenko	
Zirka-NIBAS Kirovohrad	Kirovohrad	Zirka Stadium; ARZ Stadium (43rd)	Oleksandr Ishchenko	
Zakarpattia Uzhhorod	Uzhhorod	Avanhard Stadium	Yuriy Chyrkov	Ernest Kesler; Ivan Lednei
FC Skala Stryi	Stryi	Sokil Stadium; Central Stadium (ppd)	Roman Pokora	Yuriy Smerdov
Vorskla Poltava	Poltava	Vorskla Stadium	Viktor Pozhechevskyi	
Khimik Severodonetsk	Sieverodonetsk	Khimik Stadium	Yuriy Vankevych	
Odesa	Odesa	SKA Stadium	Serhiy Marusyn	
Naftokhimik Kremenchuk	Kremenchuk	Dnipro Stadium; Vahonobudivnyk Stadium (11th); Naftokhimik Stadium (21st, 22nd and 2nd half)	Mykhailo Byelykh	

== Final table ==
Pos	Team	Pld	W	D	L	GF	GA	GD	Pts	Promotion or relegation
1	Zirka-NIBAS Kirovohrad (C, P)	42	27	10	5	68	26	+42	91	Promoted to Vyshcha Liha
2	CSKA-Borysfen Boryspil (P)	42	26	9	7	73	31	+42	87	Promoted to Vyshcha Liha
3	Metalurh Nikopol	42	24	7	11	66	42	+24	79	
4	Khimik Zhytomyr	42	20	15	7	61	37	+24	75	
5	Naftovyk Okhtyrka	42	23	3	16	69	51	+18	72	
6	Podillia Khmelnytskyi	42	20	11	11	48	39	+9	71	
7	Dynamo-2 Kyiv	42	19	8	15	65	40	+25	65	
8	Polihraftekhnika Oleksandria	42	18	8	16	59	37	+22	62	
9	Stal Alchevsk	42	19	5	18	57	50	+7	62	
10	Metalist Kharkiv	42	17	9	16	48	44	+4	60	
11	Vorskla Poltava	42	17	8	17	49	48	+1	59	
12	SC Odesa	42	16	8	18	51	51	0	56	
13	Bazhanovets Makiivka	42	16	7	19	52	57	−5	55	
14	Khimik Siverodonetsk	42	15	9	18	43	56	−13	54	
15	Bukovyna Chernivtsi	42	16	5	21	43	45	−2	53	
16	Naftokhimik Kremenchuk	42	14	10	18	50	50	0	52	
17	Zakarpattia Uzhhorod	42	12	10	20	40	62	−22	46	
18	Krystal Chortkiv	42	12	9	21	35	67	−32	45	
19	Skala Stryi	42	12	9	21	31	65	−34	45	
20	Dnipro Cherkasy	42	11	8	23	32	48	−16	41	
21	Karpaty Mukacheve (R)	42	12	5	25	39	74	−35	41	Relegated to Second League
22	FC Sumy (R)	42	8	3	31	22	81	−59	27	Relegated to Second League

(C) Champions; (P) Promoted; (R) Relegated

Persha Liha 1994-95 Winners
Zirka-NIBAS Kirovohrad
First title

== Top scorers ==
Statistics are taken from here.

	Scorer	Goals (Pen.)	Team
1	(Ukraine) Serhiy Chuichenko	27 (5)	Polihraftekhnika Oleksandriya
2	(Ukraine) Andriy Husin	21	Dynamo-2 Kyiv
3	(Ukraine) Oleksiy Hrachov	18 (2)	Naftovyk Okhtyrka
4	(Ukraine) Vyacheslav Suvorov	16 (1)	Metalist Kharkiv
5	(Ukraine) Valeriy Sofilkanych	14	Khimik Zhytomyr
5	(Ukraine) Viktor Diak	14 (1)	Bazhanovets Makiivka
5	(Ukraine) Vadym Plotnikov	14 (2)	Stal Alchevsk
8	(Ukraine) Viktor Oliynyk	13 (1)	Zirka-NIBAS Kirovohrad
9	(Ukraine) Kostyantyn Babych	12	Metalurh Nikopol
10	(Ukraine) Oleksandr Omelchuk	11 (8)	Metalurh Nikopol

== See also ==
- 1994–95 Ukrainian Premier League
- 1994–95 Ukrainian Second League
- 1994–95 Ukrainian Third League
- 1994–95 Ukrainian Cup
- 1994–95 Ukrainian Football Amateur League
