= 1995–96 Ukrainian First League =

Ukrainian First League
- Season: 1995–96
- Champions: Vorskla Poltava
- Promoted: Vorskla Poltava
- Relegated: (all withdrew) - Naftokhimik, Ratusha, Skala
- Top goalscorer: (36) Serhiy Chuychenko (Polihraftekhnika/Vorskla)
- Biggest home win: (8:0) Khimik S/d - Ratusha
- Biggest away win: (0:7) Ratusha - Lviv
- Highest scoring: (8:1) Polihraftekhnika - Zakarpattia

1995–96 Ukrainian First League was the fifth season of the Ukrainian First League which was easily won by Vorskla Poltava. The season started on August 4, 1995, and finished on July 1, 1996.

== Promotion and relegation ==
=== Promoted teams ===
Two clubs promoted from the 1994–95 Ukrainian Second League.

- FC Yavir Krasnopillia – champion (debut)
- FC Lviv – 2nd place (debut)

=== Relegated teams ===
Two clubs were relegated from the 1994-95 Ukrainian Top League:

- FC Temp Shepetivka – 18th place (returning after two seasons)
- FC Veres Rivne – 18th place (returning after three seasons)

=== Renamed teams ===
- FC Bazhanovets Makiivka was renamed to FC Shakhtar Makiivka before the season
- FC Temp Shepetivka merged with FC Advis Khmelnytskyi before the season and was renamed to FC Temp-Advis Khmelnytskyi

=== Teams ===
In 1995-96 season, the Ukrainian First League consists of the following teams:

Locations of teams in First League

Club	City	Stadium	Coach	Replaced coach(es)
Metalist Kharkiv	Kharkiv	Metalist Stadium	Viktor Udovenko	Viktor Kamarzayev
Veres Rivne	Rivne	Avanhard Stadium	Vyacheslav Kobeletskyi	Volodymyr Vusatyi
Polihraftekhnika Oleksandriya	Oleksandriya	Olimp Stadium	Anatoliy Buznyk	
Podillya Khmelnytskyi	Khmelnytskyi; Krasyliv	Podillya Stadium; Yunist Stadium	Volodymyr Bulhakov	Volodymyr Stryzhevskyi
Krystal Chortkiv	Chortkiv	Kharchovyk Stadium	Semen Osynovskyi	Ivan Hamaliy
FC Lviv	Lviv	Yunist Stadium	Stepan Yurchyshyn	
Dynamo-2 Kyiv	Kyiv	Dynamo Stadium	Volodymyr Onyshchenko	Anatoliy Kroshchenko
Yavir Krasnopillia	Krasnopillya	Kolos Stadium; Yavir Stadium	Valeriy Dushkov	Valeriy Bermudes
Stal Alchevsk	Alchevsk	Stal Stadium	Anatoliy Volobuyev	
Dnipro Cherkasy	Cherkasy	Central Stadium; Spartak Stadium	Ihor Chupryna	Semen Osynovskyi
Bazhanovets Makiivka	Makiivka	Avanhard Stadium	Viktor Pyshchev	
Bukovyna Chernivtsi	Chernivtsi	Bukovyna Stadium	Yukhym Shkolnykov	
Khimik Zhytomyr	Zhytomyr	City Stadium	Andriy Biba	Volodymyr Nechayev
Naftovyk Okhtyrka	Okhtyrka	Naftovyk Stadium	Oleksandr Dovbiy	Andriy Biba
Metalurh Nikopol	Nikopol	Elektrometalurh Stadium	Hryhoriy Verzhelenko	Pavlo Yakovenko
Temp-Advis Khmelnytskyi; Ratusha Kamianets-Podilskyi	Khmelnytskyi; Kamianets-Podilskyi	Podillya Stadium; Tonkocheyev CS	Oleksandr Petrov	Valeriy Dushkov
Zakarpattia Uzhhorod	Uzhhorod	Avanhard Stadium	Matviy Bobal	
FC Skala Stryj	Stryi	Sokil Stadium	Yuriy Shulyatytskyi	Roman Pokora
Vorskla Poltava	Poltava	Vorskla Stadium; Lokomotyv Stadium	Viktor Pozhechevskyi	
Khimik Severodonetsk	Sieverodonetsk	Khimik Stadium	Yuriy Koval	Yuriy Vankevych
SC Odesa	Odesa	SKA Stadium	Serhiy Marusyn	
Naftokhimik Kremenchuk	Kremenchuk	Naftokhimik Stadium; Dnipro Stadium	Mykhailo Byelykh	

== Final table ==
Pos	Team	Pld	W	D	L	GF	GA	GD	Pts	Promotion or relegation
1	Vorskla Poltava (C, P)	42	32	7	3	92	37	+55	103	Promoted to Vyshcha Liha
2	Bukovyna Chernivtsi	42	30	5	7	83	34	+49	95	
3	Stal Alchevsk	42	26	5	11	73	40	+33	83	
4	Polihraftekhnika Oleksandria	42	23	7	12	69	37	+32	76	
5	Metalurh Nikopol	42	23	5	14	59	40	+19	74	
6	Dynamo-2 Kyiv	42	20	12	10	64	42	+22	72	
7	Khimik Severodonetsk	42	20	11	11	68	32	+36	71	
8	Naftovyk Okhtyrka	42	18	12	12	52	37	+15	66	
9	Shakhtar Makiivka	42	19	7	16	63	55	+8	64	
10	Krystal Chortkiv	42	19	6	17	70	54	+16	63	
11	FC Lviv	42	18	8	16	55	42	+13	62	
12	Podillia Khmelnytskyi	42	17	11	14	57	50	+7	62	
13	Yavir Krasnopillia	42	17	9	16	53	43	+10	60	
14	Khimik Zhytomyr	42	16	10	16	55	57	−2	58	
15	Naftokhimik Kremenchuk (D)	42	16	7	19	43	45	−2	55	Withdrew
16	Veres Rivne	42	15	9	18	39	49	−10	54	
17	Zakarpattia Uzhhorod	42	14	8	20	49	67	−18	50	
18	SC Odesa	42	11	11	20	35	63	−28	44	
19	Metalist Kharkiv	42	10	9	23	40	54	−14	39	
20	Dnipro Cherkasy	42	6	4	32	26	91	−65	22	
21	Ratusha Kamyanets-Podilskyi (R)	42	6	2	34	14	103	−89	20	Relegation to Druha Liha
22	Skala Stryi (R)	42	2	3	37	21	108	−87	9	Relegation to Druha Liha

(C) Champions; (D) Withdrew; (P) Promoted; (R) Relegated

Note:
FC Temp Shepetivka at first united with FC Advis Khmelnytskyi. At winter break the club withdrew and was dissolved. To save the situation in the place of former Temp there was formed completely new team out of random amateur players based in Kamyanets-Podilskyi was given the name of Ratusha. The club folded at the end of the season.

Persha Liha 1995-96 Winners
FC Vorskla Poltava
First title

== Top scorers ==
Statistics are taken from here.

	Scorer	Goals (Pen.)	Team
1	(Ukraine) Serhiy Chuichenko	35 (9)	Polihraftekhnika / Vorskla
2	(Ukraine) Viktor Diak	21 (4)	Shakhtar Makiivka
3	(Ukraine) Borys Finkel	20 (1)	Bukovyna Chernivtsi
3	(Ukraine) Vadym Plotnikov	20 (5)	Stal Alchevsk
5	(Ukraine) Ivan Shariy	18 (2)	Vorskla Poltava
6	(Ukraine) Vitaliy Samoilov	17	Dynamo-2 Kyiv
7	(Ukraine) Oleksandr Prudkyi	15 (1)	Zakarpattia Uzhhorod
7	(Ukraine) Mykola Fedorko	15 (4)	Podillya Khmelnytskyi
9	(Ukraine) Serhiy Chernoshvets	14 (4)	Naftovyk Okhtyrka
9	(Kyrgyzstan) Oleksandr Agarin	14 (5)	Dnipro / Krystal
