= 1996–97 Ukrainian First League =

Ukrainian First League
- Season: 1996–97
- Champions: Metalurh Donetsk
- Promoted: Metalurh Mariupol
- Relegated: Odesa; Krystal Chortkiv; Podillya Khmelnytskyi; Veres Rivne
- Top goalscorer: (22) Oleksiy Antyukhin (Dynamo-2 Kyiv)

1996–97 Ukrainian First League was the sixth season of the Ukrainian First League which was won by Metalurh Donetsk. The season started on August 4, 1996, and finished on June 20, 1997.

== Promotion and relegation ==
=== Promoted teams ===
Three clubs promoted from the 1995–96 Ukrainian Second League.

Group A

- FC CSKA Kyiv – champion (returning after four seasons, previously in 1992 as SKA Kyiv)

Group B

- FC Metalurh Mariupol – champion (returning after four seasons, previously in 1992 as FC Azovets Mariupol)
- FC Metalurh Donetsk – promotion play-off (debut)

=== Relegated teams ===
Three clubs were relegated from the 1995-96 Ukrainian Top League:

- SC Mykolaiv – 16th place (returning after two seasons, previously in 1994-95 as FC Evis Mykolaiv)
- FC Volyn Lutsk – 17th place (debut)
- FC Zorya Luhansk – 18th place (debut)

=== Renamed teams ===
- FC Zakarpattia Uzhhorod changed its name to FC Verkhovyna Uzhhorod before the season.
- FC CSKA Kyiv changed its name to FC CSKA-2 Kyiv before the season since becoming the farm team of the Borysfen-CSKA merger.
- FC Dnipro Cherkasy changed its name to FC Cherkasy during the winter break.

=== Teams ===
In 1996-97 season, the Ukrainian First League consists of the following teams:

Locations of teams in First League

Club	City	Stadium	Coach	Replaced coach(es)
Metalist Kharkiv	Kharkiv	Metalist Stadium	Mykhailo Fomenko	Viktor Udovenko
Veres Rivne	Rivne	Avanhard Stadium	Viacheslav Kobeletsky	
Poligraftechnika Olexandria	Oleksandriya	Olimp Stadium	Yuriy Koval	Anatoliy Buznyk
Podillya Khmelnytskyi	Khmelnytskyi; Krasyliv	Podillya Stadium; Yunist Stadium	Vitaliy Kvartsyanyi	Volodymyr Bulhakov
Krystal Chortkiv	Chortkiv	Kharchovyk Stadium	V.Ivehesh	Ivan Hamaliy
Lviv	Lviv	Yunist Stadium	Stepan Yurchyshyn	
Dynamo-2 Kyiv	Kyiv	Dynamo Stadium	Volodymyr Onyshchenko	
Yavir Krasnopillia	Krasnopillya	Kolos Stadium; Yavir Stadium	Valeriy Dushkov	
Stal Alchevsk	Alchevsk	Stal Stadium	Anatoliy Volobuyev	
Dnipro Cherkasy	Cherkasy	Central Stadium; Spartak Stadium	Semen Osynovskyi	Ihor Chupryna
Bazhanovets Makiivka	Makiivka	Avanhard Stadium	Viktor Pyshchev	
Bukovyna Chernivtsi	Chernivtsi	Bukovyna Stadium	V.Bohuslavsky	Yukhym Shkolnykov
Khimik Zhytomyr	Zhytomyr	City Stadium	Hryhoriy Ishchenko	V.Veber
Naftovyk Okhtyrka	Okhtyrka	Naftovyk Stadium	Vasyl Yermak	Oleksandr Dovbiy
Metalurh Nikopol	Nikopol	Elektrometalurh Stadium	Hryhoriy Verzhelenko	
Volyn Lutsk	Lutsk	Avanhard Stadium	A.Radchenko	
Zakarpattia Uzhhorod	Uzhhorod	Avanhard Stadium	Oleksandr Holokolosov Sr.	Matviy Bobal
Zorya Luhansk	Luhansk	Avanhard Stadium	A.Shakun	Anatoliy Kuksov
CSKA-2 Kyiv	Kyiv	CSKA Stadium	A.Shtelin	A.Petrakov
Khimik Severodonetsk	Sieverodonetsk	Khimik Stadium	Yuriy Koval	Yuriy Vankevych
Odesa	Odesa	SKA Stadium	Serhiy Marusyn	
SC Mykolaiv	Mykolaiv	Central Stadium	Anatoliy Zayaev	Yevhen Kucherevsky
Metalurh Donetsk	Donetsk	Shakhtar Stadium	Yevhen Korol	
Metalurh Mariupol	Mariupol	Azovstal Stadium	Yuriy Pohrebnyak	

== Final table ==
Pos	Team	Pld	W	D	L	GF	GA	GD	Pts	Promotion or relegation
1	Metalurh Donetsk (C, P)	46	32	5	9	77	39	+38	101	Promoted to Vyshcha Liha
2	Dynamo-2 Kyiv	46	29	8	9	91	33	+58	95	
3	Metalurh Mariupol (P)	46	29	6	11	92	56	+36	93	Promoted to Vyshcha Liha
4	Volyn Lutsk	46	26	5	15	62	47	+15	83	
5	Naftovyk Okhtyrka	46	25	6	15	76	43	+33	81	
6	Stal Alchevsk	46	23	9	14	76	43	+33	78	
7	SC Mykolaiv	46	21	12	13	66	37	+29	75	
8	FC Lviv	46	20	9	17	56	43	+13	69	
9	Bukovyna Chernivtsi	46	19	10	17	64	51	+13	67	
10	Polihraftekhnika Oleksandria	46	17	14	15	55	51	+4	65	
11	Metalurh Nikopol	46	20	4	22	60	66	−6	64	
12	Metalist Kharkiv	46	18	9	19	55	53	+2	63	
13	Yavir Krasnopillia	46	18	7	21	61	61	0	61	
14	Khimik Severodonetsk	46	16	11	19	64	62	+2	59	
15	Verkhovyna Uzhhorod	46	17	7	22	56	78	−22	58	
16	Shakhtar Makiivka	46	15	11	20	55	62	−7	56	
17	FC Cherkasy	46	16	7	23	46	78	−32	55	
18	Khimik Zhytomyr	46	15	10	21	44	61	−17	55	
19	CSKA-2 Kyiv	46	15	9	22	37	56	−19	54	
20	Zoria Luhansk	46	16	5	25	58	84	−26	53	
21	SC Odesa (R)	46	14	8	24	47	79	−32	50	Relegated to Second League
22	Podillia Khmelnytskyi (R)	46	11	13	22	40	66	−26	46	Relegated to Second League
23	Veres Rivne (R)	46	11	9	26	36	79	−43	42	Relegated to Second League
24	Krystal Chortkiv (R)	46	9	6	31	31	77	−46	33	Relegated to Second League

(C) Champions; (P) Promoted; (R) Relegated

Persha Liha 1996-97 Winners
FC Metalurh Donetsk
First title

== Top scorers ==
Statistics are taken from here.

	Scorer	Goals (Pen.)	Team
1	(Ukraine) Oleksiy Antyukhin	22 (7)	Dynamo-2 Kyiv
2	(Ukraine) Yuriy Hetman	21 (1)	Metalurh Mariupol
3	(Ukraine) Oleksandr Sevidov	20	Metalurh Donetsk
4	(Ukraine) Viktor Dyak	18 (10)	Shakhtar Makiivka
5	(Ukraine) Kostyantyn Pinchuk	16 (12)	Metalurh Mariupol
6	(Ukraine) Yevhen Sonin	15 (3)	SC Mykolaiv
7	(Ukraine) Oleksandr Ostashov	14	Metalurh D. / Stal
7	(Ukraine) Oleh Babenko	14 (1)	Khimik Severodonetsk
9	(Ukraine) Oleksandr Karabuta	13	Metalist Kharkiv
9	(Ukraine) Borys Shurshyn	13 (2)	Yavir Krasnopillya

== See also ==
- Ukrainian Premier League 1996-97
- Ukrainian Second League 1996-97
