= Oleh Venhlinskyi =

Ukrainian footballer (born 1978)

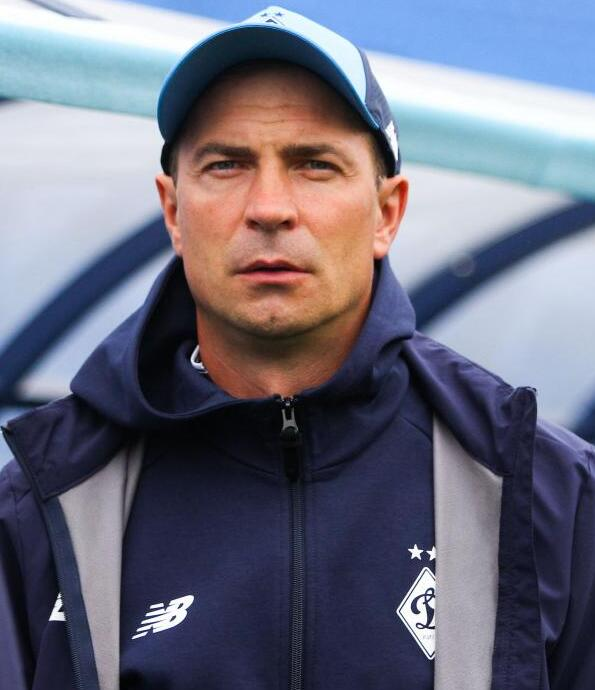
- Venhlinskyi in 2021

Personal information
- Full name: Oleh Mykolayovych Venhlinskyi
- Date of birth: 21 March 1978 (age 48)
- Place of birth: Kyiv, Ukrainian SSR
- Height: 1.79 m (5 ft 10 in)
- Position: Forward

Youth career
- Dynamo Kyiv

Senior career*
Years	Team	Apps	(Gls)
1995–2002	Dynamo Kyiv	25	(5)
1995–2000	→ Dynamo-3 Kyiv	17	(4)
1995–2001	→ Dynamo-2 Kyiv	169	(63)
2002–2005	Dnipro Dnipropetrovsk	57	(31)
2005–2006	AEK Athens	15	(3)
2006–2009	Chornomorets Odesa	46	(4)
Total		329	(110)

International career
1998	Ukraine U21	3	(2)
1998–2005	Ukraine	10	(1)
- * Club domestic league appearances and goals

Oleh Mykolayovych Venhlinskyi (Ukrainian: Олег Миколайович Венглінський; born 21 March 1978) is a Ukrainian former professional footballer who played as a forward. He most recently served as an assistant coach of Ukrainian Premier League club Dynamo Kyiv.

== Club career ==
Venhlinskyi began his career with the Ukrainian powerhouse Dynamo Kyiv, but made a name for himself after moving to Dnipro Dnipropetrovsk. He spent a long stint in the Dynamo's second team, but after transferring to Dnipropetrovsk he became a favorite scoring a couple of impressive and decisive goals in Ukrainian Premier League and UEFA Cup for Dnipro Dnipropetrovsk.

In 2003, he was promised by experts an overwhelming career after earning the Ukrainian Footballer of the Year award. However, Venhlynskyi is renowned for his numerous injuries that have hampered his career at certain points in his life. On 21 June 2005, Venhlinskyi was transferred to the Greek side, AEK Athens for a fee of €850,000. He was unable to solidify a first-place spot at the club. On 29 June 2006 Venhlinskyi terminated his contract and returned to Ukraine to sign for Chornomorets Odesa for three years. In 2009, he left as his contract expired.

== International career ==
Venhlinskyi played his first international game in a friendly game on 15 July 1998 against Poland at home.

== Career statistics ==
=== Club ===
Appearances and goals by club, season and competition
Club	Season	League			Cup		Europe		Other		Total	
Club	Season	Division	Apps	Goals	Apps	Goals	Apps	Goals	Apps	Goals	Apps	Goals
Dynamo-3 Kyiv	1994–95	Amateurs	7	0			–		–		7	0
Dynamo-3 Kyiv	1995–96	Amateurs			1	0	–		–		1	0
Dynamo-3 Kyiv	1997–98	Ukrainian Second League	3	2			–		–		3	2
Dynamo-3 Kyiv	1998–99	Ukrainian Second League	4	1			–		–		4	1
Dynamo-3 Kyiv	1999–2000	Ukrainian Second League	1	1			–		–		1	1
Dynamo-3 Kyiv	2000–01	Ukrainian Second League	1	0			–		–		1	0
Dynamo-3 Kyiv	2001–02	Ukrainian Second League	1	0			–		–		1	0
Dynamo-3 Kyiv	Total		17	4	1	0	0	0	0	0	18	4
Dynamo-2 Kyiv	1995–96	Ukrainian First League	16	3	2	0	–		–		18	3
Dynamo-2 Kyiv	1996–97	Ukrainian First League	27	7	2	0	–		–		29	7
Dynamo-2 Kyiv	1997–98	Ukrainian First League	32	12			–		–		32	12
Dynamo-2 Kyiv	1998–99	Ukrainian First League	28	16			–		–		28	16
Dynamo-2 Kyiv	1999–2000	Ukrainian First League	26	16			–		–		26	16
Dynamo-2 Kyiv	2000–01	Ukrainian First League	15	4			–		–		15	4
Dynamo-2 Kyiv	2001–02	Ukrainian First League	25	5			–		–		25	5
Dynamo-2 Kyiv	Total		169	63	4	0	0	0	0	0	173	63
Dynamo Kyiv	1997–98	Ukrainian Premier League	5	0	4	0					9	0
Dynamo Kyiv	1998–99	Ukrainian Premier League	8	4	2	1					10	5
Dynamo Kyiv	1999–2000	Ukrainian Premier League	6	1							6	1
Dynamo Kyiv	2000–01	Ukrainian Premier League	1	0							1	0
Dynamo Kyiv	2001–02	Ukrainian Premier League	5	0							5	0
Dynamo Kyiv	Total		25	5	6	1					31	6
Dnipro Dnipropetrovsk	2002–03	Ukrainian Premier League	23	19	3	1					26	20
Dnipro Dnipropetrovsk	2003–04	Ukrainian Premier League	19	9	5	2					24	11
Dnipro Dnipropetrovsk	2004–05	Ukrainian Premier League	15	3	2	1					17	4
Dnipro Dnipropetrovsk	Total		57	31	10	4					67	35
Dnipro Dnipropetrovsk B	2004–05	Reserve League	1	0			–		–		1	0
AEK Athens	2005–06	Super League Greece	15	3	4	0	2	0			21	3
Chornomorets Odesa	2006–07	Ukrainian Premier League	24	3							24	3
Chornomorets Odesa	2007–08	Ukrainian Premier League	21	1	2	0					23	1
Chornomorets Odesa	2008–09	Ukrainian Premier League	2	0							2	0
Chornomorets Odesa	Total		47	4	2	0					49	4
Chornomorets Odesa B	2006–07	Reserve League	1	0			–		–		1	0
Career total			332	110	27	5	2	0	0	0	361	115

=== International ===
Appearances and goals by national team and year
National team	Year	Apps	Goals
Ukraine	1998	1	0
Ukraine	2001	1	0
Ukraine	2003	2	0
Ukraine	2004	2	1
Ukraine	2005	4	0
Total		10	1

Scores and results list Ukraine's goal tally first, score column indicates score after each Venhlinskyi goal.

List of international goals scored by Oleh Venhlinskyi
No.	Date	Venue	Opponent	Score	Result	Competition
1	28 April 2004	Valeriy Lobanovskyi Dynamo Stadium, Kyiv, Ukraine	Slovakia	1–0	1–1	Friendly

== Honours ==
Individual

- Ukrainian Footballer of the Year: 2003
