= Ukrainian First League =

Association football league in Ukraine

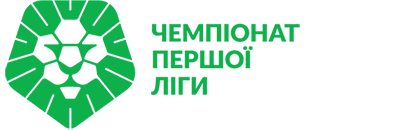
- Founded: 1992; 34 years ago
- Country: Ukraine
- Number of clubs: 16
- Level on pyramid: 2
- Promotion to: Ukrainian Premier League
- Relegation to: Ukrainian Second League
- Domestic cup: Ukrainian Cup
- Current champions: Epitsentr Kamianets-Podilskyi (2025–26)
- Most championships: 3 – Dynamo-2 Kyiv, Hoverla Uzhhorod, Zirka Kropyvnytskyi
- Top scorer: 116 – Vadym Plotnikov and Serhiy Chuichenko (2018)
- Sponsor: FavBet (2014–15)
- Website: pfl.ua
- Current: 2026–27 Ukrainian First League

The Persha Liha (Ukrainian: Перша ліга [ˈpɛrʃɐ ˈl⁽ʲ⁾iɦɐ]) or Ukrainian First League is a level of national football competitions (second tier) in Ukraine governed by the Professional Football League at the discretion of the Ukrainian Association of Football. Members of the league also participate in the Ukrainian Cup. The league is the intermediate level within the three-tiered "competition pyramid".

== History ==
The league was set up by the newly reorganized Football Federation of Ukraine (a successor of the Football Federation of the Ukrainian SSR) with the falling apart Soviet Union as a second tier, lower than Ukrainian Higher League (Vyshcha Liha) and higher that Ukrainian Transitional League (Perekhidna Liha).

The very first round of games that took place for this league was on 14 March 1992. The league itself was organised just a few months before that and consisted mostly of all the Ukrainian clubs that previously competed in the one of groups of the Soviet Lower Second League (4th tier, see Ukrainian Soviet competitions). To the league were also added some Soviet Top League reserve squads of the Soviet Top League reserve squads competition and the three best performers of the Ukrainian football championship among amateurs, KFK (Fitness clubs).

The Persha Liha (First League) is lower than the Vyshcha Liha (Higher League) (currently known as the Ukrainian Premier League) and is the second division of the Ukrainian professional football league system.

The First League was incorporated into the PFL organisation that combined all the football leagues of non-amateur clubs (Top, First, and Second). On 26 May 1996 the Constituent Conference of non-amateur clubs took place which created the professional league, and confirmed its statute as well as its administration. Most of the clubs that had previously participated in the Ukrainian football league competitions were reorganized as professional, a process that actually started in the late 1980s. On 17 July the professional league signed an agreement with several other national football organizations to organize competitions among the professional clubs (its members). According to the newspaper Halychyna (Ivano-Frankivsk) the annual budget of league's clubs varied between ₴6 million to ₴30 million in 2010.

The League officially became the top league of the Professional Football League (PFL) from 15 April 2008 when the Ukrainian Premier League reorganized itself into a self-governed entity. Usually the top two teams from the First League are promoted to the Premier League, while the two lowest teams from the Premier League are demoted to the First League. Because each club is only allowed to be represented with a single squad per each league, the second squad's promotion often is voided, thus, allowing the promotion of the third placed club during a season. One of the most successful second squads is of Dynamo Kyiv (FC Dynamo-2 Kyiv).

== Current composition ==
The following teams are competing in the 2025–26 season. Two teams were spared from relegation from the previous season due to other teams' withdrawal. In addition to each team's name, its home city and stadium are shown.

former Premier (Vyshcha) Liha clubs
recently relegated from Premier (Vyshcha) Liha
recently promoted from Second (Druha) Liha

| Team | Home city | Stadium | Capacity | Position in 2024–25 | First season in 1L | Seasons in 1L |
|---|---|---|---|---|---|---|
| Ahrobiznes | Volochysk, Khmelnytskyi Oblast | Yunist | 2,700 | 5th | 2018–19 | 6 |
| Bukovyna | Chernivtsi | Bukovyna | 12,076 | 7th | 1994–95 | 15 |
| Chernihiv | Chernihiv | Chernihiv Arena | 500 | 2L | 2022–23 | 2 |
| Chornomorets | Odesa | Chornomorets | 34,164 | PL | 1998–99 | 6 |
| Feniks-Mariupol | Lviv | SKIF | 3,742 | 13th | 2022–23 | 3 |
| Inhulets | Petrove, Kirovohrad Oblast | Inhulets | 1,720 | PL | 2016–17 | 5 |
| Livyi Bereh | Kyiv | Arena Livyi Bereh (Hnidyn) | 4,700 | PL | 2023–24 | 1 |
| Metalist | Kharkiv | Avanhard (Uzhhorod) | 10,383 | 6th | 1994–95 | 8 |
| Metalurh | Zaporizhia | Slavutych Arena | 11,883 | 14th | 2019–20 | 4 (Note: Without considering one season on the record for the previous Metalurh Zaporizhia) |
| Nyva Ternopil | Ternopil | Misky imeni Shukhevycha | 15,150 | 11th | 2001–02 | 10 |
| Podillya | Khmelnytskyi | Podillya | 6,800 | 15th | 1992 | 10 |
| Probiy | Horodenka, Ivano-Frankivsk | Probiy Arena | 2,500 | 2L | 2025–26 | debut |
| Prykarpattia | Ivano-Frankivsk | Rukh | 6,500 | 10th | 2018–19 | 7 |
| UCSA | Tarasivka, Kyiv Oblast | imeni Bannikova (Kyiv) | 1,678 | 8th | 2024–25 | 1 |
| Viktoriya | Sumy | Kolos (Boryspil) | 5,400 | 9th | 2023–24 | 2 |
| Vorskla | Poltava | Vorskla | 24,795 | PL | 1992 | 5 |

=== Location map ===
The following displays the location of teams.

Home venues of teams in the 2025–26 Ukrainian First League.

== Format of competition ==
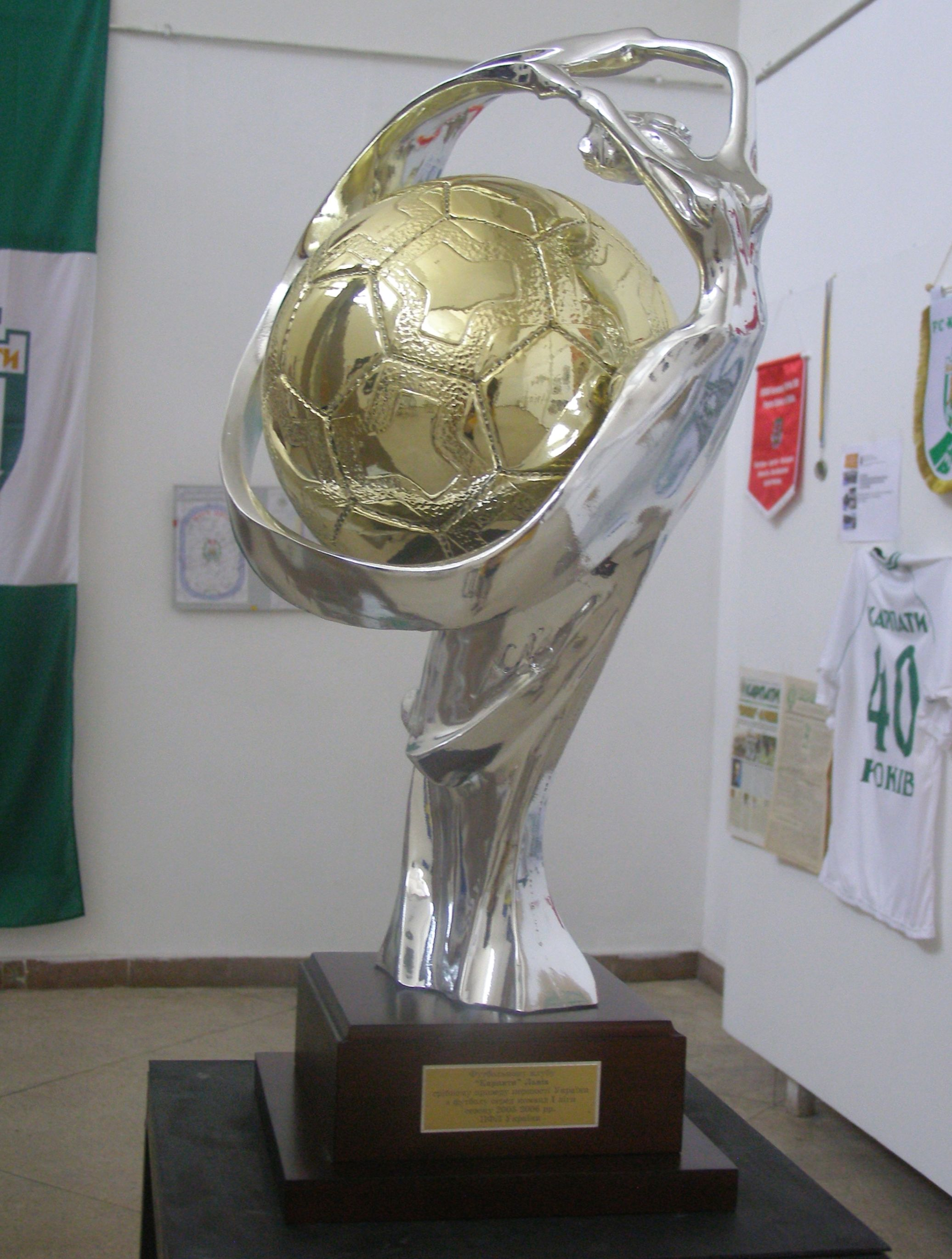
A runner-up trophy of the Ukrainian First League

=== General description ===
The league conducts its competition in a regular double round-robin format where each team plays with every other one twice. The league conducts its competitions from fall to spring, however due to climate conditions in Ukraine, a mid-season winter break is usually longer than the summer break between competition seasons. Since 1995 the league also follows the same system of points calculation that is adopted throughout the whole European continent, 3 points for win, one for draw, and none for loss.

=== Number of participants ===
During its history the number of members in the league has fluctuated. In its first years before 1999 the league consisted of 20 or more participants. Later there was an idea to decrease the number of members in all leagues in order to improve the quality of competition. Until 2013 the number of participants was reduced to 18 except for couple of seasons in 2006–2008. Recently since 2013 the number was reduced further to 16 where it remains since.

=== Relegation and promotion ===
Traditionally two better teams out of First League are being swapped for two worse teams out of Premier (Higher) League. On more rare occasions a third team gets a chance of promotion, but there were also seasons when only one team would get promoted. Only twice three teams were promoted to the top division, both times happening due to the top tier expansion. The league's winner and usually the second placed runner-up get accepted to the Premier League. However, due to the rule that a second team of the club cannot be promoted when its senior team plays in a higher tier, on few occasions when a second club team finished in top two places the third-placed team was admitted to the top division. In 2013 there was set a precedent when a club on its own will has refused to be promoted. In 2017 there was created another precedent when a club that earned promotion was denied it based on administrative decision.

With relegation, the league's policy is a bit different, although originally it also was two for two. In 1996 the Second League (lower tier) was converted into a de facto regional league with two (three) regional groups. The league has also decreased its number of participants from originally 22-24 to only 16-18. There were also number of withdrawals which triggered sometime additional number in rotation.

The relegation or promotion play-offs were previously usually organized under unforeseen circumstances such as a team's withdrawal from the league and often were not scheduled until after the season had concluded. Since 2011 relegation play-offs have become a well established tradition.

Since the turn of the millennium the frequency of withdrawals in the First League has increased among the competing clubs. In order to fight this, the league has been applying a stricter approach to every club's financial situation to avoid withdrawals during a season.

| Season | | 92/93 | 93/94 | 94/95 | 95/96 | 96/97 | 97/98 | 98/99 | 99/00 | 00/01 | 01/02 | 02/03 | 03/04 | 04/05 | 05/06 | 06/07 | 07/08 | 08/09 | 09/10 |
| League | P/R | 92/93 | 93/94 | 94/95 | 95/96 | 96/97 | 97/98 | 98/99 | 99/00 | 00/01 | 01/02 | 02/03 | 03/04 | 04/05 | 05/06 | 06/07 | 07/08 | 08/09 | 09/10 |
|---|---|---|---|---|---|---|---|---|---|---|---|---|---|---|---|---|---|---|---|
| Premier League | P | 2 | 2 | 2 | 2 | 1 | 2 | 2 | 2 | 1 | 2 | 3 | 2 | 2 | 2 | 2 | 2 | 2 | 2 |
| Premier League | R | 6 | | 2 | 2 | 3 | 2 | 2 | 1 | 3 | 2 | 1 | 1 | 1 | 2 | 2 | 2 | 2 | 2 |
| Second League | P | | 2 | 4 | 2 | 3 | 2 | 2 | 3 | 3 | 3 | 5 | 2 | 3 | 4 | 4 | 4 | 2 | 3 |
| Second League | R | 10 | 2 | 2 | 2 | 3x | 4 | 4* | 5* | 5* | 3 | 3 | 1x | 2 | 4* | 2x | 4x | 4 | 3x |

| Season | | 10/11 | 11/12 | 12/13 | 13/14 | 14/15 | 15/16 | 16/17 | 17/18 | 18/19 | 19/20 | 20/21 | 21/22 | 22/23 | 23/24 | 24/25 | 25/26 | 26/27 | 27/28 | 28/29 | 29/30 |
| League | P/R | 10/11 | 11/12 | 12/13 | 13/14 | 14/15 | 15/16 | 16/17 | 17/18 | 18/19 | 19/20 | 20/21 | 21/22 | 22/23 | 23/24 | 24/25 | 25/26 | 26/27 | 27/28 | 28/29 | 29/30 |
|---|---|---|---|---|---|---|---|---|---|---|---|---|---|---|---|---|---|---|---|---|---|
| Premier League | P | 2 | 2 | 2 | 1 | 1 | 2 | 1 | 2 | 2 | 2 | 3 | | | | | | | | | |
| Premier League | R | 2 | 2 | 2 | | | 1 | | 1 | 2 | 1 | | | | | | | | | | |
| Second League | P | 3 | 2 | 3 | 3 | 4 | 3* | 6 | 4 | 4 | 4 | 6 | | | | | | | | | |
| Second League | R | 3* | 2* | 3x | 4* | 3* | 2* | 3x | 3 | 5* | 3x | 3 | | | | | | | | | |

=== League's popularity ===
Since the 2009–10 season the First League has started to broadcast selected matches over the internet in order to increase its popularity.

The most successful clubs in the league are FC Dynamo-2 Kyiv, FC Hoverla Uzhhorod, and FC Zirka Kropyvnytskyi. All of those teams were either disbanded or went through some sort of reorganizations. In 2016 Dynamo Kyiv withdrew its second team from professional competitions, while FC Hoverla was refused in attestation. Previously in 2008 FC Zirka that went through reorganization was re-established based on a local youth football club FC Olimpik Kropyvnytskyi and in 2016 won its third championship in the league.

== Past winners and runners ==
Promoted teams are indicated in bold.

| Season | Group | Winner | Runner-up | Third place | No. of teams |
|---|---|---|---|---|---|
| 1992 | **A** | **Veres Rivne** | Pryladyst Mukacheve | Polihraftekhnika Oleksandria | 2 groups 14 each |
| 1992 | **B** | **Kryvbas Kryvyi Rih** | Metalurh Nikopol | Artania Ochakiv | 2 groups 14 each |
| 1992–93 | | **Nyva Vinnytsia** | **Temp Shepetivka** | Naftovyk Okhtyrka | 22 |
| 1993–94 | | **Prykarpattya Ivano-Frankivsk** | **Evis Mykolaiv** | Polihraftekhnika Oleksandria | 20 |
| 1994–95 | | **Zirka-NIBAS Kirovohrad** | **CSKA-Borysfen Boryspil** | Metalurh Nikopol | 22 |
| 1995–96 (Note: In 1995–96, the second team that was promoted was CSKA Kyiv. CSKA Kyiv was promoted from the 1995–96 Ukrainian Second League (third tier) by forcing Borysfen Boryspil to restart from the third tier.) | | **Vorskla Poltava** | Bukovyna Chernivtsi | Stal Alchevsk | 22 |
| 1996–97 | | **Metalurh Donetsk** | Dynamo-2 Kyiv | **Metalurh Mariupol** | 24 |
| 1997–98 | | **SC Mykolaiv** | Dynamo-2 Kyiv | **Metalist Kharkiv** | 22 |
| 1998–99 | | Dynamo-2 Kyiv | **Chornomorets Odesa** | Torpedo Zaporizhia | 20 |
| 1999–00 | | Dynamo-2 Kyiv | **Stal Alchevsk** | FC Cherkasy | 18 |
| 2000–01 | | Dynamo-2 Kyiv | **Zakarpattia Uzhhorod** | **Polihraftekhnika Oleksandria** | 18 |
| 2001–02 (Note: During the winter break of the 2001–02 Vyshcha Liha (top tier), out of nowhere to the league was admitted Arsenal Kyiv in place of CSKA Kyiv that was in heavy debts. In its turn CSKA Kyiv was "transferred" to Persha Liha (2nd tier) in place of its reserve team, CSKA-2.) | | **SC Volyn-1 Lutsk** | **Chornomorets Odesa** | **Obolon Kyiv** | 18 |
| 2002–03 | | **Zirka Kirovohrad** | **Borysfen Boryspil** | Dynamo-2 Kyiv | 18 |
| 2003–04 | | **Zakarpattia Uzhhorod** | **Metalist Kharkiv** | Naftovyk Okhtyrka | 18 |
| 2004–05 (Note: In 2004–05, instead of Arsenal Kharkiv, to the Vyshcha Liha was promoted a newly formed club FC Kharkiv (2005). Initially, it was intended that FC Kharkiv would be a "successor" of Arsenal, but Arsenal restarted in the third tier.) | | **Stal Alchevsk** | Arsenal Kharkiv | Zorya Luhansk | 18 |
| 2005–06 | | **Zorya Luhansk** | **Karpaty Lviv** | Obolon Kyiv | 18 |
| 2006–07 | | **Naftovyk-Ukrnafta Okhtyrka** | **Zakarpattia Uzhhorod** | Obolon Kyiv | 20 |
| 2007–08 | | **Illichivets Mariupol** | **FC Lviv** | Obolon Kyiv | 20 |
| 2008–09 | | **Zakarpattia Uzhhorod** | **Obolon Kyiv** | PFC Oleksandria | 18 |
| 2009–10 | | **PFC Sevastopol** | **Volyn Lutsk** | Stal Alchevsk | 18 |
| 2010–11 | | **PFC Oleksandria** | **Chornomorets Odesa** | Stal Alchevsk | 18 |
| 2011–12 | | **Hoverla-Zakarpattia Uzhhorod** | **Metalurh Zaporizhya** | FC Sevastopol | 18 |
| 2012–13 | | **FC Sevastopol** | Stal Alchevsk | PFC Oleksandria | 18 |
| 2013–14 | | **FC Olimpik Donetsk** | PFC Oleksandria | Stal Alchevsk | 16 |
| 2014–15 (Note: According to the season's regulations, only one club was expected to be promoted. However, due to the ongoing Russo-Ukrainian War, the Ukrainian company ISD from Eastern Ukraine that owned Metalurh Donetsk and Stal Dniprodzerzhynsk decided to merge both clubs; thus, Stal replaced Metalurh, while Metalurh was dissolved.) | | **FC Oleksandriya** | **Stal Dniprodzerzhynsk** | Hirnyk-Sport Komsomolsk | 16 |
| 2015–16 | | **Zirka Kirovohrad** | Cherkaskyi Dnipro | Obolon-Brovar Kyiv | 16 |
| 2016–17 (Note: Desna Chernihiv was denied promotion on the pretense that its stadium was not suitable for the Ukrainian Premier League. The promotion was passed down to the next club, Veres Rivne. Veres, at the same time, also did not have a suitable stadium and for the whole season in the Ukrainian Premier League played outside of its home city.) | | **Illichivets Mariupol** | Desna Chernihiv | **Veres Rivne** | 18 |
| 2017–18 (Note: In 2017–18, FC Lviv was admitted to the Premier League from the 2017–18 Ukrainian Second League replacing the recently promoted the "people's club" Veres Rivne. Veres restarted from the third tier next season.) | | **Arsenal Kyiv** | FC Poltava | **Desna Chernihiv** | 18 |
| 2018–19 | | **SC Dnipro-1** | **Kolos Kovalivka** | Volyn Lutsk | 16 |
| 2019–20 | | **FC Mynai** | **Rukh Lviv** | **Inhulets Petrove** | 16 |
| 2020–21 | | **Veres Rivne** | **Chornomorets Odesa** | **Metalist 1925 Kharkiv** | 16 |
| **2021–22** (Note: Although the season was not finished and no winner was declared, nonetheless the top two teams were promoted.) | | **Metalist Kharkiv** | **Kryvbas Kryvyi Rih** | Alians Lypova Dolyna | 16 |
| 2022–23 | | **Polissia Zhytomyr** | **Obolon Kyiv** | **LNZ Cherkasy** | 2 groups 8 each |
| 2023–24 | | **Inhulets Petrove** | **Karpaty Lviv** | **Livyi Bereh Kyiv** | 2 groups 10 each |
| 2024–25 (Note: For teams were promoted, the fourth one was FC Kudrivka (4th place).) | | **Epitsentr Kamianets-Podilskyi** | **SC Poltava** | **Metalist 1925 Kharkiv** | 2 groups 9 each |
| 2025–26 | | **Bukovyna Chernivtsi** | **Chornomorets Odesa** | **Livyi Bereh Kyiv** | 16 |
| 2026–27 | | | | | 16 |

== Post-season play-offs ==
Post-season play-offs are not common feature of the First League competition. Over the years there were several instances when clubs contested promotion or relegation berths. The first post-season feature consisted of a relegation mini tournament that took place in July 1998 in Kyiv and Boryspil. It involved three group winners of the Second League and Bukovyna that placed 18th place in the First League. The tournament identified clubs which would qualify for the 1998–99 Ukrainian First League. The next year the league featured its first promotion play-off.

=== Promotion play-offs ===
see Ukrainian Premier League#Relegation play-offs

=== Relegation play-offs ===
| Season | First League team | Score | Second League team | Place |
|---|---|---|---|---|
| 1997–98 | Four-team single round-robin tournament | | | |
| 2010–11 | Enerhetyk Burshtyn | 2–0 | PFC Sumy | in Uman |
| 2011–12 | MFC Mykolaiv | 4–3 | Avanhard Kramatorsk | in Khmelnytskyi |
| 2012–13 | FC Odesa | 0–2, 1–4 | Nyva Ternopil | home/away |
| 2012–13 | Dynamo-2 Kyiv | 1–1, 1–0 | Shakhtar Sverdlovsk | home/away |
| 2014–15 | MFC Mykolaiv | 0–0, 1–0 | Kremin Kremenchuk | home/away |
| 2015–16 | FC Ternopil | cancelled | Bukovyna Chernivtsi | home/away |
| 2016–17 | PFC Sumy | 2–0, 1–1 | Balkany Zoria | home/away |
| 2018–19 | PFC Sumy | 0–4, 1–3 | FC Cherkashchyna-Akademiya | home/away |
| 2018–19 | Ahrobiznes Volochysk | 0–1, 4–0 | Metalurh Zaporizhia | home/away |
| 2019–20 | Metalurh Zaporizhia | 0–2, 0–1 | Alians Lypova Dolyna | home/away |
| 2019–20 | Cherkashchyna Cherkasy | 1–1, 0–2 | Veres Rivne | home/away |
In 2021–2022 play-offs were not held due to the expansion of the Ukrainian Premier League and later the Russian invasion of Ukraine
| 2022–23 | FSC Mariupol | 0–1, 1–1 | FC Khust | home/away |
| 2023–24 | FC Khust | 1–1, 0–1 | PFC Zviahel | home/away |
| 2023–24 | Metalurh Zaporizhia | 0–4, 1–3 | UCSA Tarasivka | home/away |
| 2024–25 | Metalurh Zaporizhia | 0–2, 0–3 | FC Chernihiv | home/away |
| 2024–25 | Podillya Khmelnytskyi | 1–0, 2–0 | Kolos-2 Kovalivka | home/away |
| 2025–26 | Canceled due to clubs' withdrawal | | | home/away |

== Statistics ==
=== Performance by club ===
| Team | Winners | Winning years | Runners-up | Runners years | Promotions |
|---|---|---|---|---|---|
| Hoverla-Zakarpattia Uzhhorod | 3 | 2003–04, 2008–09, 2011–12 | 2 | 2000–01, 2006–07 | 5 |
| Dynamo-2 Kyiv | 3 | 1998–99, 1999–00, 2000–01 | 2 | 1996–97, 1997–98 | 0 |
| Zirka Kirovohrad ‡ | 3 | 1994–95, 2002–03, 2015–16 | 0 | | 3 |
| FC Oleksandriya | 2 | 2010–11, 2014–15 | 1 | 2013–14 | 3 |
| Illichivets Mariupol | 2 | 2007–08, 2016–17 | 0 | | 3 |
| Veres Rivne ‡ | 2 | 1992 (group winner), 2020–21 | 0 | | 3 |
| FC Sevastopol | 2 | 2009–10, 2012–13 | 0 | | 2 |
| Stal Alchevsk | 1 | 2004–05 | 2 | 1999–00, 2012–13 | 2 |
| MFC Mykolaiv | 1 | 1997–98 | 1 | 1993–94 | 2 |
| Volyn Lutsk | 1 | 2001–02 | 1 | 2009–10 | 2 |
| Kryvbas Kryvyi Rih ‡ | 1 | 1992 (group winner) | 1 | (2021–22) | 2 |
| Bukovyna Chernivtsi | 1 | 2025–26 | 1 | 1995–96 | 1 |
| Arsenal Kyiv ‡ | 1 | 2017–18 | 0 | | 2 |
| Inhulets Petrove | 1 | 2023–24 | 0 | | 2 |
| Nyva Vinnytsia ‡ | 1 | 1992–93 | 0 | | 1 |
| Prykarpattia Ivano-Frankivsk | 1 | 1993–94 | 0 | | 1 |
| Vorskla Poltava | 1 | 1995–96 | 0 | | 1 |
| Metalurh Donetsk | 1 | 1996–97 | 0 | | 1 |
| Zorya Luhansk | 1 | 2005–06 | 0 | | 1 |
| Naftovyk-Ukrnafta Okhtyrka | 1 | 2006–07 | 0 | | 1 |
| Olimpik Donetsk | 1 | 2013–14 | 0 | | 1 |
| SC Dnipro-1 | 1 | 2018–19 | 0 | | 1 |
| FC Mynai | 1 | 2019–20 | 0 | | 1 |
| Polissya Zhytomyr | 1 | 2022–23 | 0 | | 1 |
| Epitsentr Kamianets-Podilskyi | 1 | 2024–25 | 0 | | 1 |
| Metalist Kharkiv ‡ | 1 | (2021–22) | 1 | 2003–04 | 3 |
| Chornomorets Odesa | 0 | | 5 | 1998–99, 2001–02, 2010–11, 2020–21, 2025–26 | 5 |
| Borysfen Boryspil | 0 | | 2 | 1994–95, 2002–03 | 2 |
| Karpaty Lviv ‡ | 0 | | 2 | 2005–06, 2023–24 | 2 |
| FC Lviv ‡ | 0 | | 1 | 2007–08 | 2 |
| Obolon Kyiv | 0 | | 1 | 2008–09 | 2 |
| Temp Shepetivka | 0 | | 1 | 1992–93 | 1 |
| Metalurh Zaporizhia | 0 | | 1 | 2011–12 | 1 |
| Stal Dniprodzerzhynsk | 0 | | 1 | 2014–15 | 1 |
| Desna Chernihiv | 0 | | 1 | 2016–17 | 1 |
| Kolos Kovalivka | 0 | | 1 | 2018–19 | 1 |
| Rukh Lviv | 0 | | 1 | 2019–20 | 1 |
| Obolon Kyiv | 0 | | 1 | 2022–23 | 1 |
| SC Poltava | 0 | | 1 | 2024–25 | 1 |
| Pryladyst Mukacheve | 0 | | 1 | 1992 (group winner) | 0 |
| Metalurh Nikopol | 0 | | 1 | 1992 (group winner) | 0 |
| Arsenal Kharkiv | 0 | | 1 | 2004–05 | 0 |
| Cherkaskyi Dnipro | 0 | | 1 | 2015–16 | 0 |
| FC Poltava | 0 | | 1 | 2017–18 | 0 |
| Metalist 1925 Kharkiv | 0 | | 0 | | 2 |
| Livyi Bereh Kyiv | 0 | | 0 | | 2 |
| CSKA Kyiv | 0 | | 0 | | 1 |
| FC Kharkiv (2005) | 0 | | 0 | | 1 |
| LNZ Cherkasy | 0 | | 0 | | 1 |
| FC Kudrivka | 0 | | 0 | | 1 |

Notes:

- ‡ – indicates a phoenix club of the original

=== League winners by region ===
| Number | Region | Winners |
|---|---|---|
| 6 | Kirovohrad Oblast | Zirka Kropyvnytskyi (3), FC Oleksandriya (2), Inhulets Petrove |
| 4 | Donetsk Oblast | Illichivets Mariupol (2), Metalurh Donetsk, Olimpik Donetsk |
| 4 | Kyiv | Dynamo-2 Kyiv (3), Arsenal Kyiv |
| 4 | Zakarpattia Oblast | Hoverla Uzhhorod (3), FC Mynai (1) |
| 2 | Sevastopol | FC Sevastopol (2) |
| 2 | Luhansk Oblast | Stal Alchevsk, Zorya Luhansk |
| 2 | Dnipropetrovsk Oblast | Kryvbas Kryvyi Rih, SC Dnipro-1 |
| 2 | Rivne Oblast | Veres Rivne (2) |
| 1 | Ivano-Frankivsk Oblast | Prykarpattia Ivano-Frankivsk |
| 1 | Mykolaiv Oblast | Mykolaiv |
| 1 | Poltava Oblast | Vorskla Poltava |
| 1 | Sumy Oblast | Naftovyk-Ukrnafta Okhtyrka |
| 1 | Vinnytsia Oblast | Nyva Vinnytsia |
| 1 | Volyn Oblast | Volyn Lutsk |
| 1 | Zhytomyr Oblast | Polissya Zhytomyr |
| 1 | Khmelnytskyi Oblast | Epitsentr Kamianets-Podilskyi |
| 1 | Chernivtsi Oblast | Bukovyna Chernivtsi |
| 0 | Kharkiv Oblast | Metalist Kharkiv (war season) |

=== All-time table ===
Top-20. All figures are correct through the 2022–23 season. Club status is current of the 2023–24 season:

| 2023–24 Ukrainian Premier League |
| 2023–24 Ukrainian First League |
| 2023–24 Ukrainian Second League |
| 2023–24 Ukrainian Football Amateur League |
| 2023 Regional competitions |
| Club is defunct |

| PL | Team | Seasons | GP | W | D | L | GS | GA | Pts | Achievement | Prom | First | Last |
|---|---|---|---|---|---|---|---|---|---|---|---|---|---|
| 1 | Dynamo-2 Kyiv | 25 | 888 | 403 | 219 | 266 | 1312 | 882 | 1428 | Winner | – | 1992 | 2015–16 |
| 2 | Naftovyk-Ukrnafta Okhtyrka | 24 | 856 | 378 | 201 | 277 | 1131 | 891 | 1335 | Winner | 1 | 1992–93 | 2017–18 |
| 3 | Stal Alchevsk | 21 | 752 | 361 | 155 | 236 | 1082 | 786 | 1238 | Winner | 2 | 1992 | 2014–15 |
| 4 | Mykolaiv | 22 | 763 | 309 | 174 | 280 | 944 | 858 | 1101 | Winner | 2 | 1992–93 | 2020–21 |
| 5 | Oleksandriya | 18 | 652 | 312 | 164 | 176 | 903 | 595 | 1100 | Winner | 3 | 1992 | 2014–15 |
| 6 | Hoverla Uzhhorod | 15 | 550 | 246 | 107 | 197 | 678 | 666 | 845 | Winner | 5 | 1992 | 2011–12 |
| 7 | Volyn Lutsk | 15 | 509 | 242 | 91 | 176 | 712 | 575 | 817 | Winner | 2 | 1996–97 | 2021–22 |
| 8 | Obolon Kyiv | 15 | 469 | 213 | 102 | 154 | 608 | 469 | 741 | Runner-up | 3 | 1999–00 | 2022–23 |
| 9 | Desna Chernihiv | 14 | 484 | 189 | 112 | 183 | 581 | 536 | 679 | Runner-up | 1 | 1992 | 2017–18 |
| 10 | Polissya Zhytomyr | 15 | 513 | 187 | 107 | 219 | 562 | 645 | 668 | Winner | 1 | 1992 | 2022–23 |
| 11 | Elektrometalurh-NZF Nikopol | 11 | 418 | 183 | 71 | 164 | 498 | 506 | 620 | Runner-up | – | 1992 | 2001–02 |
| 12 | Bukovyna Chernivtsi | 12 | 464 | 167 | 101 | 196 | 506 | 566 | 602 | Runner-up | – | 1994–95 | 2022–23 |
| 13 | Helios Kharkiv (Kobra) | 13 | 437 | 162 | 116 | 159 | 449 | 471 | 602 | 4th | – | 2005–06 | 2017–18 |
| 14 | Zirka Kropyvnytskyi | 12 | 398 | 167 | 94 | 137 | 486 | 412 | 595 | Winner | 3 | 1994–95 | 2018–19 |
| 15 | Nyva Vinnytsia | 11 | 394 | 157 | 98 | 139 | 441 | 405 | 569 | Winner | 1 | 1992–93 | 2011–12 |
| 16 | CSKA Kyiv | 13 | 464 | 153 | 88 | 223 | 433 | 586 | 547 | 5th | – | 1992 | 2007–08 |
| 17 | Dnipro Cherkasy | 11 | 416 | 148 | 86 | 182 | 459 | 540 | 530 | Runner-up | – | 1992 | 2007–08 |
| 18 | Spartak Sumy | 11 | 372 | 129 | 77 | 166 | 400 | 475 | 464 | 9th | – | 1995–96 | 2006–07 |
| 19 | Spartak Ivano-Frankivsk | 9 | 320 | 128 | 76 | 116 | 369 | 348 | 460 | Winner | 1 | 1992–93 | 2006–07 |
| 20 | Krymteplytsia Molodizhne | 8 | 276 | 121 | 68 | 87 | 353 | 294 | 431 | 4th | – | 2005–06 | 2012–13 |

== People ==
=== Players ===
Among notable players of the league are its top scorers. The title of the league's top scorer earned on multiple occasions the following players, Serhiy Chuichenko (4 times, Polihraftekhnika Oleksandriya), Oleh Hrytsai (2 times, FC Cherkasy), Oleksandr Aliyev (2 times, Dynamo-2 Kyiv), Matviy Bobal (2 times, Ihroservis Simferopol), Oleksandr Akymenko (2 times, Stal A. / Inhulets), Stanislav Kulish (2 times, Stal D. / Dnipro-1). Once among top scorers became a foreign player during the 2021–22 war season, Matheus Peixoto (Brazil, playing for Metalist Kharkiv).

All-time First League appearance leaders
| **Player** | **Games** | **Years** |
| (Ukraine) Andriy Tsvik | 429 | 1992–2005 |
| (Ukraine) Bohdan Yesyp | 400 | 1996–2014 |
| (Ukraine) Volodymyr Melnychenko | 384 | 1994–2007 |
| (Ukraine) Vadym Oliynyk | 383 | 1992–2002 |
| (Ukraine) Yevhen Manko | 380 | 1993–2005 |
| (Ukraine) Oleksandr Aharin | 373 | 1994–2010 |
| (Ukraine) Oleksandr Kohutych | 352 | 1992–2004 |
| (Ukraine) Serhiy Polushyn | 343 | 1992–2005 |
| (Ukraine) Oleksiy Tarhonskyi | 336 | 1992–2003 |
| (Ukraine) Vitaliy Vizaver | 325 | 1997–2014 |
Players **in bold** are still playing in First League; Data as of 4 December 2023

All-time First League scorers
| **Player** | **Goals** | **Games** | **Years** |
| (Ukraine) Vadym Plotnikov | 116 | 306 | 1992–2000 |
| (Ukraine) / (Turkmenistan) Serhiy Chuichenko | 116 | 177 | 1993–2001 |
| (Ukraine) Oleksandr Akymenko | 106 | 283 | 2007–2021 |
| (Ukraine) Bohdan Yesyp | 101 | 400 | 1996–2013 |
| (Ukraine) Pavlo Onysko | 91 | 206 | 2001–2012 |
| (Ukraine) Pavlo Parshyn | 85 | 305 | 1992–2005 |
| (Ukraine) Matviy Bobal | 79 | 202 | 2000–2012 |
| (Ukraine) **Oleksandr Batalskyi** | 75 | 278 | 2009– |
| (Ukraine) Oleksandr Kosyrin | 74 | 166 | 1996–2012 |
| (Ukraine) Viktor Arefyev | 71 | 275 | 1993–2006 |
Players **in bold** are still playing in First League; Data accurate as of 3 December 2023

=== Managers ===
All-time top-10 managers with league games
| **Rank** | **Coach** | **Games** | **First** | **Last** |
| 1 | (Ukraine) Anatoliy Volobuyev | 571 | 1992 | 2013 |
| 2 | (Ukraine) Volodymyr Onyshchenko | 448 | 1992 | 2007 |
| 3 | (Ukraine) Yuriy Koval | 436 | 1992 | 2010 |
| 4 | (Ukraine) Oleksandr Ryabokon | 391 | 2001 | 2018 |
| 5 | (Ukraine) Serhiy Shevchenko | 269 | 2002 | 2010 |
| 6 | (Ukraine) Andriy Parkhomenko | 238 | 2009 | 2020 |
| 7 | (Ukraine) Mykola Fedorenko | 228 | 2001 | 2014 |
| 8 | (Ukraine) Ihor Zhabchenko | 228 | 2010 | 2023 |
| 9 | (Ukraine) Mykola Prystai | 227 | 2001 | 2011 |
| 10 | (Ukraine) Stepan Yurchyshyn | 223 | 1996 | 2008 |
Coaches **in bold** are still active in the League; Data as of 23 December 2023

**Winning managers**
| Season | Nationality | Winning manager | Club | Ref |
|---|---|---|---|---|
| 1992 | UKR | Viktor Nosov | Veres Rivne | |
| 1992 | UKR | Volodymyr Stryzhevskyi | Kryvbas Kryvyi Rih | |
| 1992–93 | UKR | Yukhym Shkolnykov | Nyva Vinnytsia | |
| 1993–94 | UKR | Ihor Yurchenko | Prykarpattia | |
| 1994–95 | UKR | Oleksandr Ishchenko | Zirka-NIBAS Kirovohrad | |
| 1995–96 | UKR | Viktor Pozhechevskyi | Vorskla Poltava | |
| 1996–97 | UKR | Yevhen Korol | Metalurh Donetsk | |
| 1997–98 | UKR | Anatoliy Zayaev | SC Mykolaiv | |
| 1998–99 | UKR | Valeriy Zuyev (2) | Dynamo-2 Kyiv | |
| 1999–00 | UKR | Valeriy Zuyev (2) | Dynamo-2 Kyiv | |
| 2000–01 | UKR | Volodymyr Onyshchenko | Dynamo-2 Kyiv | |
| 2001–02 | UKR | Vitaliy Kvartsyanyi | Volyn-1 Lutsk | |
| 2002–03 | UKR | Yuriy Koval | Zirka Kirovohrad | |
| 2003–04 | UKR | Viktor Ryashko | Zakarpattia Uzhhorod | |
| 2004–05 | UKR | Anatoliy Volobuyev | Stal Alchevsk | |
| 2005–06 | UKR | Yuriy Koval (2) | Zorya Luhansk | |
| 2006–07 | UKR | Serhiy Shevchenko | Naftovyk-Ukrnafta Okhtyrka | |
| 2007–08 | UKR | Oleksandr Ishchenko (2) | Illichivets Mariupol | |

**Winning managers (cont.)**
| Season | Nationality | Winning manager | Club | Ref |
|---|---|---|---|---|
| 2008–09 | UKR | Mykhailo Ivanytsia | Zakarpattia Uzhhorod | |
| 2009–10 | UKR | Oleh Leschynskyi | PFC Sevastopol | |
| 2010–11 | UKR | Volodymyr Sharan | PFC Oleksandriya | |
| 2011–12 | UKR | Oleksandr Sevidov | Hoverla-Zakarpattia Uzhhorod | |
| 2012–13 | RUS | Oleg Kononov | PFC Sevastopol | |
| 2013–14 | UKR | Roman Sanzhar | Olimpik Donetsk | |
| 2014–15 | UKR | Volodymyr Sharan (2) | FC Oleksandriya | |
| 2015–16 | UKR | Serhiy Lavrynenko | Zirka Kirovohrad | |
| 2016–17 | UKR | Oleksandr Sevidov (2) | Illichivets Mariupol | |
| 2017–18 | UKR | Serhiy Litovchenko | Arsenal Kyiv | |
| 2018–19 | UKR | Dmytro Mykhaylenko | SC Dnipro-1 | |
| 2019–20 | UKR | Vasyl Kobin | FC Mynai | |
| 2020–21 | UKR | Yuriy Virt | Veres Rivne | |
| 2021–22 | UKR | Oleksandr Kucher | Metalist Kharkiv | |
| 2022–23 | UKR | Yuriy Kalitvintsev | Polissia Zhytomyr | |
| 2023–24 | UKR | Vladyslav Lupashko | Inhulets Petrove | |
| 2024–25 | UKR | Serhiy Nahornyak | Epitsentr Kamianets-Podilskyi | |

No manager has won the league more than two times. With 2 league titles there are Valeriy Zuyev (both Dynamo-2 Kyiv), Oleksandr Ishchenko (Zirka and Illichivets), Yuriy Koval (Zirka and Zorya), Oleksandr Sevidov (Hoverla and Illichivets), Volodymyr Sharan (both Oleksandriya).

Best managers
| Season | Nationality | Winning manager | Club | Ref |
|---|---|---|---|---|
| 2017 | UKR | Oleksandr Ryabokon | Desna Chernihiv | |
| 2018 | UKR | Ruslan Kostyshyn | Kolos Kovalivka | |
| 2019 | UKR | Serhiy Kovalets | Obolon Kyiv | |
| 2020 | UKR | Oleksandr Chyzhevskyi | Ahrobiznes Volochysk | |
| 2021 | UKR | Yuriy Virt | Veres Rivne | |

== Stadiums ==
Considered to be as second tier competitions, the league has number of big stadiums with capacity of 20,000+, among which the most notable are Metalist Stadium in Kharkiv, Dnipro-Arena in Dnipro, Ukraina Stadium in Lviv, Yuvileiny Stadium in Sumy and Shakhtar Stadium in Donetsk. Just before the Euro 2012, the First League clubs also played at the RSC Olimpiyskiy also located in Donetsk. Among smaller stadiums (10,000 – 20,000) are Central Stadium in Mykolaiv, Dynamo Stadium in Kyiv, Avanhard Stadium in Lutsk, Chernihiv Stadium in Chernihiv and Central Stadium in Cherkasy.

=== Attendance ===
Most attended games in the league (1992-2017) recorded at Yuvileiny Stadium (Sumy).

| # | Season | Attendance | Home team | Score | Visiting team | Stadium | Ref |
|---|---|---|---|---|---|---|---|
| 1 | 2002–03 | 29,300 | Spartak Sumy | 1:0 | Naftovyk Okhtyrka | Yuvileiny Stadium | |
| 2 | 1997–98 | 27,000 | Mykolaiv | 1:0 | Dynamo-2 Kyiv | Tsentralnyi Stadion | |
| 3 | 2002–03 | 25,200 | Spartak Sumy | 2:1 | Shakhtar-2 Donetsk | Yuvileiny Stadium | |
| 4 | 2002–03 | 23,000 | Spartak Sumy | 1:0 | Zirka Kropyvnytskyi | Yuvileiny Stadium | |
| 5 | 2018–19 | 22,362 | Metalist 1925 Kharkiv | 1:2 | Dnipro-1 | OSC Metalist | |
| 6 | 2005–06 | 21,000 | Zorya Luhansk | 1:0 | Karpaty Lviv | Avanhard Stadium | |

The most attended seasons were in the beginning of the 1990s and the beginning of the 2000s.
