= 1999–2000 Ukrainian First League =

Ukrainian First League
- Season: 1999–2000
- Champions: Dynamo-2 Kyiv
- Promoted: Stal Alchevsk
- Relegated: Naftovyk Okhtyrka, Polissya Zhytomyr, Obolon-PPO Kyiv, Chornomorets-2 Odesa, Torpedo Zaporizhia
- Top goalscorer: (17) Pavlo Parshyn (Polissya Zhytomyr)

1999–2000 Ukrainian First League was the ninth season of the Ukrainian First League which was won by FC Dynamo-2 Kyiv. The season started on July 25, 1999, and finished on June 19, 2000.

== Promotion and relegation ==
=== Promoted teams ===
Two clubs promoted from the 1998-99 Ukrainian Second League.

Group A

- FC Zakarpattia Uzhhorod – champion (returning after a season)

Group B

- SC Odesa – champion (returning after two seasons)

Group C

- FC Obolon-PPO Kyiv – champion (debut)

=== Relegated teams ===
One club was relegated from the 1998-99 Ukrainian Top League:

- SC Mykolaiv – 16th place (returning after a season)

=== Reorganized clubs ===
- SC Odesa was merged with Chornomorets and replaced with FC Chornomorets-2 Odesa (returning after seven seasons).

=== Teams ===
In 1999–00 season, the Ukrainian First League consists of the following teams:

Locations of teams in First League

== Standings ==
Pos	Team	Pld	W	D	L	GF	GA	GD	Pts	Promotion or relegation
1	FC Dynamo-2 Kyiv (C)	34	22	7	5	75	21	+54	73	
2	FC Stal Alchevsk (P)	34	21	7	6	58	36	+22	70	Promoted to Vyshcha Liha
3	FC Cherkasy	34	17	8	9	48	34	+14	59	
4	FC Shakhtar-2 Donetsk	34	16	8	10	47	38	+9	56	
5	FC CSKA-2 Kyiv	34	16	6	12	38	26	+12	54	
6	SC Mykolaiv	34	15	7	12	40	38	+2	52	
7	FC Lviv	34	13	12	9	34	31	+3	51	
8	FC Polihraftekhnika Oleksandria	34	13	10	11	34	34	0	49	
9	FC Yavir Sumy	34	14	6	14	42	45	−3	48	
10	FC Volyn Lutsk	34	13	9	12	42	41	+1	48	
11	FC Vinnytsia	34	14	6	14	29	39	−10	48	
12	FC Metalurh Nikopol	34	14	6	14	31	34	−3	48	
13	FC Zakarpattia Uzhhorod	34	14	6	14	36	49	−13	48	
14	FC Naftovyk Okhtyrka (R)	34	13	5	16	42	51	−9	44	Relegated to Second League
15	FC Polissya Zhytomyr (R)	34	11	7	16	36	51	−15	40	Relegated to Second League
16	FC Obolon-PPO Kyiv (R)	34	5	12	17	23	52	−29	27	Relegated to Second League
17	FC Chornomorets-2 Odesa (R)	34	6	5	23	25	49	−24	23	Relegated to Second League
18	FC Torpedo Zaporizhia (R)	34	5	1	28	21	32	−11	16	Relegated to Second League – withdrew (Note: FC Torpedo Zaporizhia was reinstated in the First League after its bankruptcy last season, but after the first half of this season it withdrew out of the competition. It was awarded technical losses throughout the whole second half.)

(C) Champions; (P) Promoted; (R) Relegated

== Top scorers ==
Statistics are taken from here.

	Scorer	Goals (Pen.)	Team
1	(Ukraine) Pavlo Parshyn	17 (5)	Polissya Zhytomyr
2	(Ukraine) Oleh Venhlinskyi	16 (1)	Dynamo-2 Kyiv
3	(Ukraine) Myroslav Bundash	15 (5)	Zakarpattia Uzhhorod
4	(Ukraine) Vadym Plotnykov	14 (3)	Stal Alchevsk
5	(Ukraine) Oleh Hrytsay	13 (2)	Cherkasy
6	(Ukraine) Ovik Halstyan	12 (3)	Torpedo Zaporizhzhia / Chornomorets-2 Odesa
7	(Ukraine) Viktor Arefyev	11 (2)	Stal Alchevsk / CSKA-2 Kyiv
7	(Ukraine) Samir Hasanov	11 (6)	Metalurh Nikopol
9	(Ukraine) Serhiy Babiychuk	10 (6)	Yavir-Sumy
9	(Ukraine) Vadym Chernyshenko	10 (6)	Polihraftekhnika Oleksandriya

== See also ==
- 1999–2000 Ukrainian Second League
- 1999–2000 Ukrainian Premier League
