= Udovenko =

Udovenko (Ukrainian: Удовенко) is a Ukrainian surname. Notable people with the surname include:

- Hennadiy Udovenko (1931–2013), Ukrainian politician and diplomat
- Platon Udovenko (1940–2026), Russian cleric
- Viktor Udovenko (born 1947), Ukrainian footballer
