= Volodymyr Melnychenko (footballer) =

Ukrainian footballer

Personal information
- Full name: Volodymyr Vasylyovych Melnychenko
- Date of birth: 5 September 1973 (age 53)
- Place of birth: Odesa, Ukrainian SSR
- Height: 1.76 m (5 ft 9 1/2 in)
- Position: Midfielder

Youth career
- DYuSSh SKA Odesa

Senior career*
| Years | Team | Apps | (Gls) |
| 1991 | Frehat Pervomaisk | | |
| 1994–1997 | SC Odesa | 88 | (18) |
| 1994–1995 | Dnistrovets Bilhorod-Dnistrovskyi | 25 | (6) |
| 1997–2000 | Polihraftekhnika Oleksandriya | 118 | (21) |
| 2001–2007 | Naftovyk Okhtyrka | 179 | (29) |
| 2008 | FC Poltava | 11 | (3) |
| 2008 | Gornyak Stroitel | 16 | (8) |
| 2009 | Bastion Illichivsk | 0 | (0) |
| 2009 | → Bastion-2 Illichivsk | 5 | (1) |
| 2009 | SotsKomBank Odesa (indoor team) | | |
- * Club domestic league appearances and goals

Volodymyr Vasylyovych Melnychenko (Ukrainian: Володимир Васильович Мельниченко; born 5 September 1973) is a Ukrainian former footballer. Melnychenko became one of footballers who played the most matches in the Ukrainian First League.

Melnychenko started out his football career just before the dissolution of the Soviet Union and is a product of the Soviet Armed Forces team of masters SKA Odesa's academy. His first coach was Serhiy Krulykovskyi.
