= FC Lviv (1992) =

Lviv
- Full name: Football Club Lviv
- Founded: 1992
- Dissolved: 2001
- Stadium: Yunist Stadium
- Chairman: Oleksandr Didenko
- Head Coach: Volodymyr Zhuravchak
- League: Ukrainian First League
- 2000–01: 5th

FC Lviv (Ukrainian: ФК «Львів») was a Ukrainian football club from the city of Lviv. It was initially founded in 1992.

== History ==
The idea about a new city's club was initiated by a Ukrainian coach Mykhailo Vilkhovyi. The club was established in 1992 as an amateur team that won the Lviv Oblast Cup and the oblast second tier competitions.

In 1993 the club entered the Ukrainian Transitional League and in two seasons progressed two tiers reaching the Ukrainian First League where it stayed until 2001. It was one of three teams that were admitted to the 1993–94 Ukrainian Transitional League and did not play in the previous 1992–93 Ukrainian Football Amateur League.

In 2001 the club was dissolved and merged with FC Karpaty Lviv as its second team.

This club held a record for being the only team from outside the Ukrainian Premier League that has progressed twice to the quarterfinals of the Ukrainian Cup competition.

== League and Cup history ==
Season	Div.	Pos.	Pl.	W	D	L	GS	GA	P	Domestic Cup	Europe	Notes
1993–94	4th	4	34	20	8	6	57	33	48	1/16 finals		Promoted
1994–95	3rd	2	42	30	3	9	73	39	93	1/64 finals		Promoted
1995–96	2nd	11	42	18	8	16	55	42	62	1/32 finals		
1996–97	2nd	8	46	20	9	17	56	43	22	1/16 finals		
1997–98	2nd	15	42	16	6	20	65	54	54	1/32 finals		
1998–99	2nd	7	38	15	12	11	58	43	57	1/16 finals		
1999–00	2nd	7	34	13	12	9	34	31	51	1/4 finals		
2000–01	2nd	5	34	17	7	10	40	31	58	1/4 finals		
Since 2001	refer to FC Karpaty-2 Lviv											

== Coaches ==
- 1993–1994 Mykhailo Vilkhovyi
- 1994–1998 Stepan Yurchyshyn
- 1999–2001 Volodymyr Zhuravchak
