= Viktor Dyak =

Ukrainian footballer and futsal player

Personal information
- Full name: Viktor Ivanovych Dyak
- Date of birth: 4 June 1971 (age 55)
- Place of birth: Soviet Union
- Position: Forward

Senior career*
Years	Team	Apps	(Gls)
1992–1998	Shakhtar Makiivka	237	(84)
1998–2000	Metalurh Donetsk	5	(0)
2000	ZTS Dubnica	15	(2)
2000	Fortuna Shakhtarsk	1	(0)
2001–2003	Elektrometalurh-NZF Nikopol	38	(6)
- * Club domestic league appearances and goals

Viktor Ivanovych Dyak (Ukrainian: Віктор Іванович Дяк; born 4 June 1971) is a former professional Ukrainian football and futsal forward who currently works as a coach in the academy of Shakhtar Donetsk.

Supposedly, in 2000 Diak also played for the Russian club FC Nemkom Krasnodar in the Russian Second League.

Diak became the second highest scorer after Serhiy Chuichenko when he scored 21 goals for FC Shakhtar Makiivka during the 1995–96 Ukrainian First League season.

In 2000–07 Diak also participated in futsal competitions playing for several futsal teams out of the Donbas region.
