= 2000–01 Ukrainian First League =

Ukrainian First League
- Season: 2000–01
- Champions: Dynamo-2 Kyiv
- Promoted: Zakarpattia Uzhhorod, Polihraftekhnika Oleksandria
- Relegated: FC Cherkasy, Spartak Sumy, Bukovyna Chernivtsi
- Top goalscorer: (20) Serhiy Chuichenko (Polihraftekhnika Oleksandria)

The 2000–01 Ukrainian First League was the tenth season of the Ukrainian First League which was won by FC Dynamo-2 Kyiv. The season started on July 23, 2000, and finished on June 28, 2001.

== Promotion and relegation ==
=== Promoted teams ===
Three clubs promoted from the 1999-2000 Ukrainian Second League.

Group A

- FC Bukovyna Chernivtsi – champion (returning after a season)

Group B

- FC Borysfen Boryspil – champion (debut)

Group C

- FC Dnipro-2 Dnipropetrovsk – champion (debut)

=== Relegated teams ===
Three clubs were relegated from the 1999-00 Ukrainian Top League:

- FC Prykarpattia Ivano-Frankivsk – 14th place (returning after six seasons)
- FC Chornomorets Odesa – 15th place (returning after a season)
- FC Zirka Kirovohrad – 16th place (returning after five seasons)

=== Renamed teams ===
- FC Yavir-Sumy changed its name to FC Spartak Sumy before start of the season.
- On May 25, 2001 FC Volyn Lutsk changed its name to SC Volyn-1 Lutsk.

=== Teams ===
In 2000-01 season, the Ukrainian First League consists of the following teams:

Locations of teams in First League

== Final standings ==
Pos	Team	Pld	W	D	L	GF	GA	GD	Pts	Promotion or relegation
1	FC Dynamo-2 Kyiv (C)	34	18	14	2	61	25	+36	68	
2	FC Zakarpattia Uzhhorod (P)	34	19	7	8	50	38	+12	64	Promoted to Vyshcha Liha
3	FC Polihraftekhnika Oleksandria (P)	34	18	9	7	50	22	+28	63	Promoted to Vyshcha Liha
4	SC Mykolaiv	34	17	8	9	41	30	+11	59	
5	FC Lviv	34	17	7	10	40	31	+9	58	
6	FC Chornomorets Odesa	34	17	6	11	44	28	+16	57	
7	FC Metalurh Nikopol	34	14	8	12	30	34	−4	50	
8	FC CSKA-2 Kyiv	34	15	1	18	36	43	−7	46	
9	SC Volyn-1 Lutsk	34	13	5	16	41	38	+3	44	
10	FC Vinnytsia	34	12	8	14	35	41	−6	44	
11	FC Dnipro-2 Dnipropetrovsk	34	13	4	17	41	43	−2	43	
12	FC Borysfen Boryspil	34	12	7	15	28	34	−6	43	
13	FC Shakhtar-2 Donetsk	34	13	4	17	31	39	−8	43	
14	FC Prykarpattia Ivano-Frankivsk	34	12	6	16	36	46	−10	42	
15	FC Zirka Kirovohrad	34	10	10	14	27	34	−7	40	
16	FC Cherkasy (R)	34	9	7	18	35	51	−16	34	Relegated to Second League
17	FC Spartak Sumy (R)	34	8	7	19	20	46	−26	31	Relegated to Second League
18	FC Bukovyna Chernivtsi (R)	34	6	8	20	18	41	−23	26	Relegated to Second League

(C) Champions; (P) Promoted; (R) Relegated

== Top scorers ==
Statistics are taken from here.

	Scorer	Goals (Pen.)	Team
1	(Ukraine) Serhiy Chuychenko	20 (8)	Polihraftekhnika Oleksandriya
2	(Ukraine) Serhiy Bohatyryov	13 (7)	Zakarpattia Uzhhorod
3	(Ukraine) Oleksiy Ivanov	11	Polihraftekhnika Oleksandriya
4	(Ukraine) Vadym Oliynyk	10 (7)	Metalurh Nikopol
5	(Ukraine) Myroslav Bundash	8	Zakarpattia Uzhhorod
5	(Ukraine) Valentyn Hrehul	8 (5)	Prykarpattia Ivano-Frankivsk
7	(Ukraine) Mykola Kovalchuk	7	CSKA-2 / Vinnytsia
7	(Ukraine) Serhiy Shubin	7	FC Vinnytsia
7	(Ukraine) Serhiy Dranytskyi	7 (3)	Chornomorets Odesa
7	(Ukraine) Oleh Mazurenko	7 (4)	SC Mykolaiv

== See also ==
- 2000–01 Ukrainian Second League
- Ukrainian Premier League 2000-01
