= Oleksandr Aharin =

Kyrgyzstani and Ukrainian footballer

Personal information
- Full name: Oleksandr Mykolayovych Aharin
- Date of birth: 24 June 1973 (age 53)
- Place of birth: Kara-Balta, Kyrgyz SSR
- Height: 1.78 m (5 ft 10 in)
- Position: Defender

Team information
- Current team: FC Naftovyk-Ukrnafta Okhtyrka

Senior career*
Years	Team	Apps	(Gls)
1990–1993	FC Alga Frunze	80	(35)
1993–2002	FC Dnipro Cherkasy	196	(28)
1995–1996	→ FC Krystal Chortkiv (loan)	29	(14)
1996	→ FC Vorskla Poltava (loan)	9	(0)
2001–2002	→ FC Volyn Lutsk (loan)	9	(0)
2002–2007	FC Naftovyk-Ukrnafta Okhtyrka	117	(18)
2007–2009	FC Ihroservice Simferopol	27	(1)
2009–	FC Naftovyk-Ukrnafta Okhtyrka	6	(0)

International career^{‡}
1992	Kyrgyzstan	4	(0)
- * Club domestic league appearances and goals as of 15 May 2010 ‡ National team caps and goals as of 15 May 2010

Oleksandr Mykolayovych Aharin (Ukrainian: Олександр Миколайович Агарін) (born on 24 June 1973) is a Kyrgyzstani and Ukrainian footballer who is a defender for FC Naftovyk-Ukrnafta Okhtyrka. He is a member of the Kyrgyzstan national football team.
