= Cherkasy Arena =

Multi-purpose stadium in Cherkasy, Ukraine

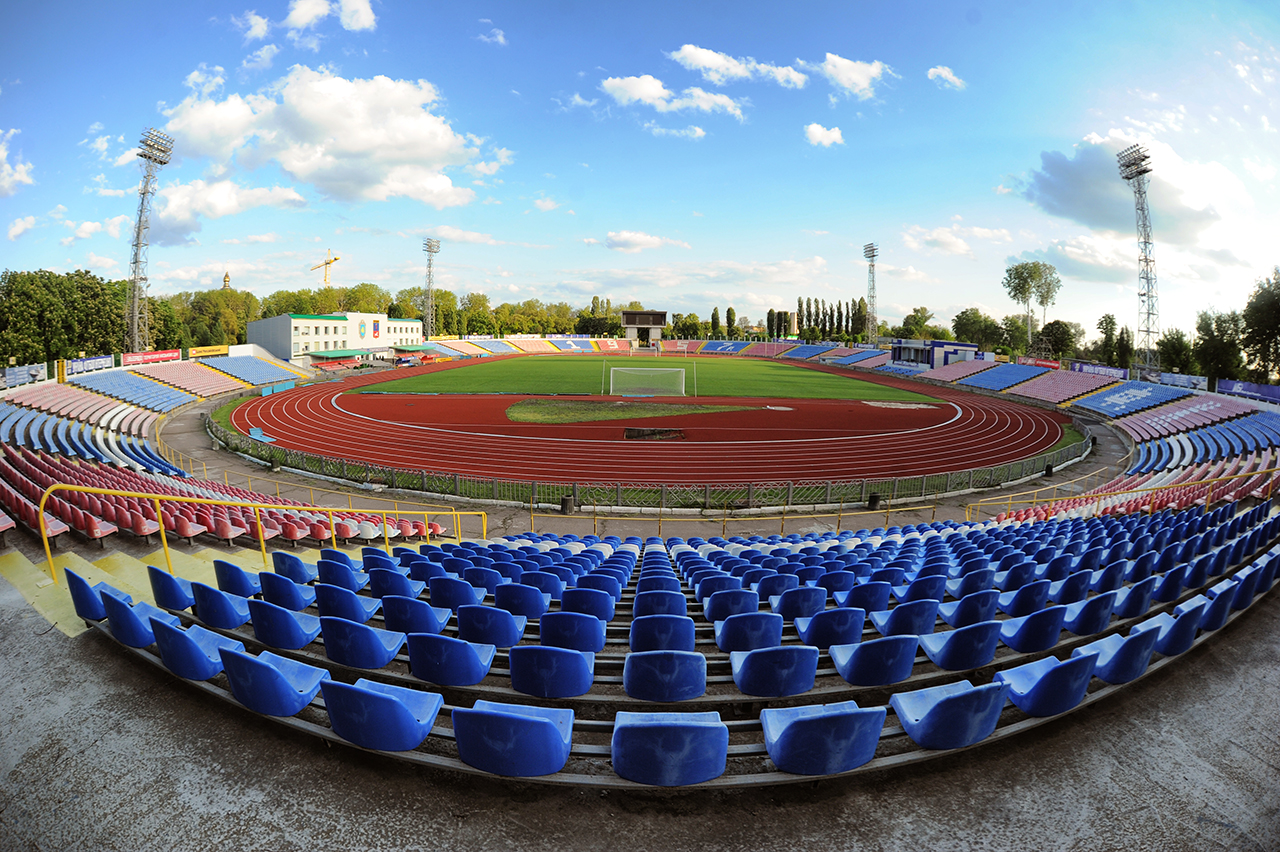
- September 2011
- Interactive map of Cherkasy Arena
- Former names: Kolhospnyk (1957–1958) imeni Leninskoho Komsomolu (1958–1992); Tsentralnyi stadion (1992–2020)
- Location: Cherkasy, Ukraine
- Coordinates: 49.4361°N 32.0547°E
- Owner: VSS "Kolhospnyk" (1957–1958); City of Cherkasy (1958–present)
- Capacity: 10,321 (football)
- Surface: Grass

Construction
- Groundbreaking: 1957
- Opened: 9 November 1957
- Renovated: 2011
- Cost: 4,386,650 Soviet rubles

Tenants
- FC Dnipro Cherkasy; FC Cherkashchyna (Slavutych Cherkasy); LNZ Cherkasy

The Cherkasy Arena (Ukrainian: Черкаси Арена) is a multi-purpose stadium in Cherkasy, Ukraine. Until 2020 it was known as the Central Stadium, Cherkasy. It is currently used mostly for football matches, and was the home of FC Dnipro Cherkasy and now the home of FC Cherkaskyi Dnipro. The stadium holds 10,321 people.

The stadium is located near the city centre next to big city park known as "Sobornyi Park" (United Park). Located on vulytsia Smilianska, the city block where stadium is located at its corner has a monument to the 100th Anniversary of Football.

== Historical overview ==
=== Older Cherkasy stadiums ===
Before 1957 in Cherkasy were about 10 stadiums with football fields. Among the biggest were "Kharchovyk" (5,000 spectators), "Trud / Avanhard" (2,500), and "Vodnyk" (1,500). The most popular among Cherkasy residents were considered "Vodnyk" and "Kharchovyk" that were built sometime between the 1920s – 1930s. At the place where now the Central Bazaar (Tsentralnyi bazaar) the stadium, that before the World War II carried the name of City (Miskyi), in late 1940s was renamed as "Vodnyk". Built by a sugar refinery, "Kharchovyk" stadium location was not changed being located at the 700th Anniversary Square. Today the stadium is called "Spartak" and belongs to infrastructure of the Cherkasy Technological University.

Before the World War II, the most important games were held at "Kharchovyk", but during the turbulent times the Sugar Refinery stadium was ruined. Therefore the main place for football clashes until early 1950s became "Vodnyk". With time, again to the epicenter of sports attention returned the rebuilt "Kharchovyk".

=== The Central Stadium ===
In 1952 after the Soviet Union national team debuted at the Helsinki Olympics and with start of the Khrushchev thaw, the Communist Party made emphasis at mass involvement in sports. It is understood that for it necessary bigger sports facilities. Those that were built mainly back in 1920s through 1930s only continued to be renovated and had low capacity. It is worth to note first persons of the newly created (Cherkasy Oblast was established in 1954) regional center on banks of Dnieper who quickly responded to the party's call. According to archival materials on 15 September 1955 due to necessity in construction of a city stadium executive committee (so called ispolkom) of the Cherkasy city council of working people allotted a plot to the regional sports society "Kolhospnyk" (today Kolos) a total area of 6 ha (15 acres) in place of park administration area and regional naturalist station and ordered draft work. Almost a year later on 20 August 1957 the regional council gave its agreement to an allotment of 4,386,650 Soviet rubles for construction of a stadium at vulytsia Komsomolska (today vulytsia Smilianska) and approved the work schedule.

On 9 November 1957 at the new stadium took place the first in its history game where in a friendly met Kolhospnyk Cherkasy and Dynamo Kyiv. Couple of days later a local newspaper printed the following article.

In the days of celebration of the Great October 40th Anniversary in Cherkasy was opened a new stadium of VSS "Kolhospnyk". There was completed the first stage of this sports facility, football field with seats for spectators, cinder track, office building, ticket offices towards vulytsia Komsomolska. Construction of the stadium's second stage will be completed in October of 1958.
On 9 November thousands of Cherkasy residents filled stands of the new stadium. Here took place the first friendly in football between the Class A team Dynamo Kyiv and Kolhospnyk Cherkasy. The Cherkasy players showed a great will to victory, to full exertion of their force. But they yet lack coherence, mastery, ability to complete plays with a shot on goal. The encounter with the score of 3:1 was won by more experienced ball masters, the Kiev players. — "The New Stadium is opened", Cherkaska Pravda, 11 November 1957

In December 1957 according to decision of the Committee of Physical Culture and Sports of the USSR Council the football team "Kolhospnyk" Cherkasy was included in the national championship competitions of the Class B teams of masters. The unprecedented at that time decision was made due to the fact that in Cherkasy in November 1957 entered in operation a new stadium, stands of which had 27 sectors for almost 15,000 spectators, and since 1 January 1958 it was placed on the city's balance. Since the initiator of the stadium construction was a regional sports council of "Kolhospnyk", from November 1957 to May 1958 the sports facility had the same name with that sports society. On 9 May 1958 (the Soviet Victory Day) on decision of regional council the newly built stadium was awarded in name of the Lenin's Komsomol. It had connections to the fact that an active role in its construction took Komsomol activists and the Soviet youth. In 1992 as Ukraine received its independence there arose a question about renaming of the stadium. It was decided collegially, that it will have the name of Central Stadium.

=== Reconstruction and recent activities ===
In 2011 the stadium was renovated as in Cherkasy was established a new football club Slavutych Cherkasy (today FC Cherkashchyna) on initiative of Cherkasy Oblast "governor" Serhiy Tulub. It should be reminded that at that time Ukraine was also preparing to host the UEFA Euro 2012 and many of stadiums throughout the country were renovated. For renovation of the main Cherkasy stadium, the regional council allocated ₴800,000, and the city council allocated almost ₴2.8 million. another ₴2 million came from the state budget, bringing a total of ~₴5.6 million. The vice-president of Slavutych Volodymyr Khodak noted that at stadium were increased areas of administrative building by doubling their size. It included locker rooms, showers and toilets. The locker rooms furniture was replaced with new. Also at the stadium were replaced water and heat supplies as well as electric wiring. There also was replaced irrigation system that was not in service for the last couple of years. In immediate future place was reconstruction of running track and lighting. Among other plans there were expansion of parking lot by some 500 spaces, toilets for fans, and availability of video broadcasting at the stadium's scoreboard.

Due to the Russian invasion and War in Donbas, the stadium was temporarily used by FC Shakhtar Donetsk that in 2014 played three games, two of which as part of the Ukrainian Premier League.

== Gallery ==
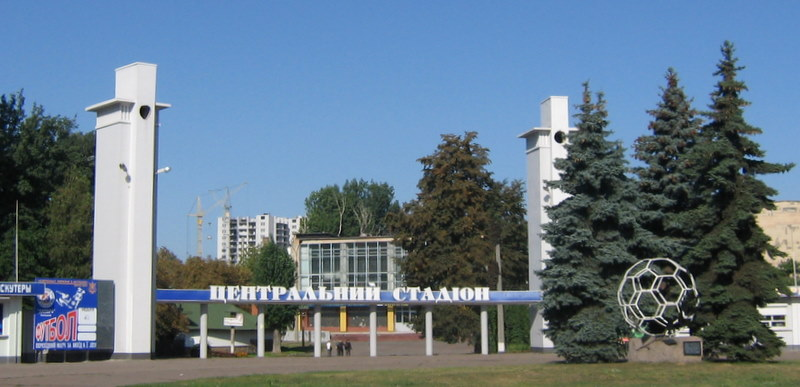
Entrance (2009)

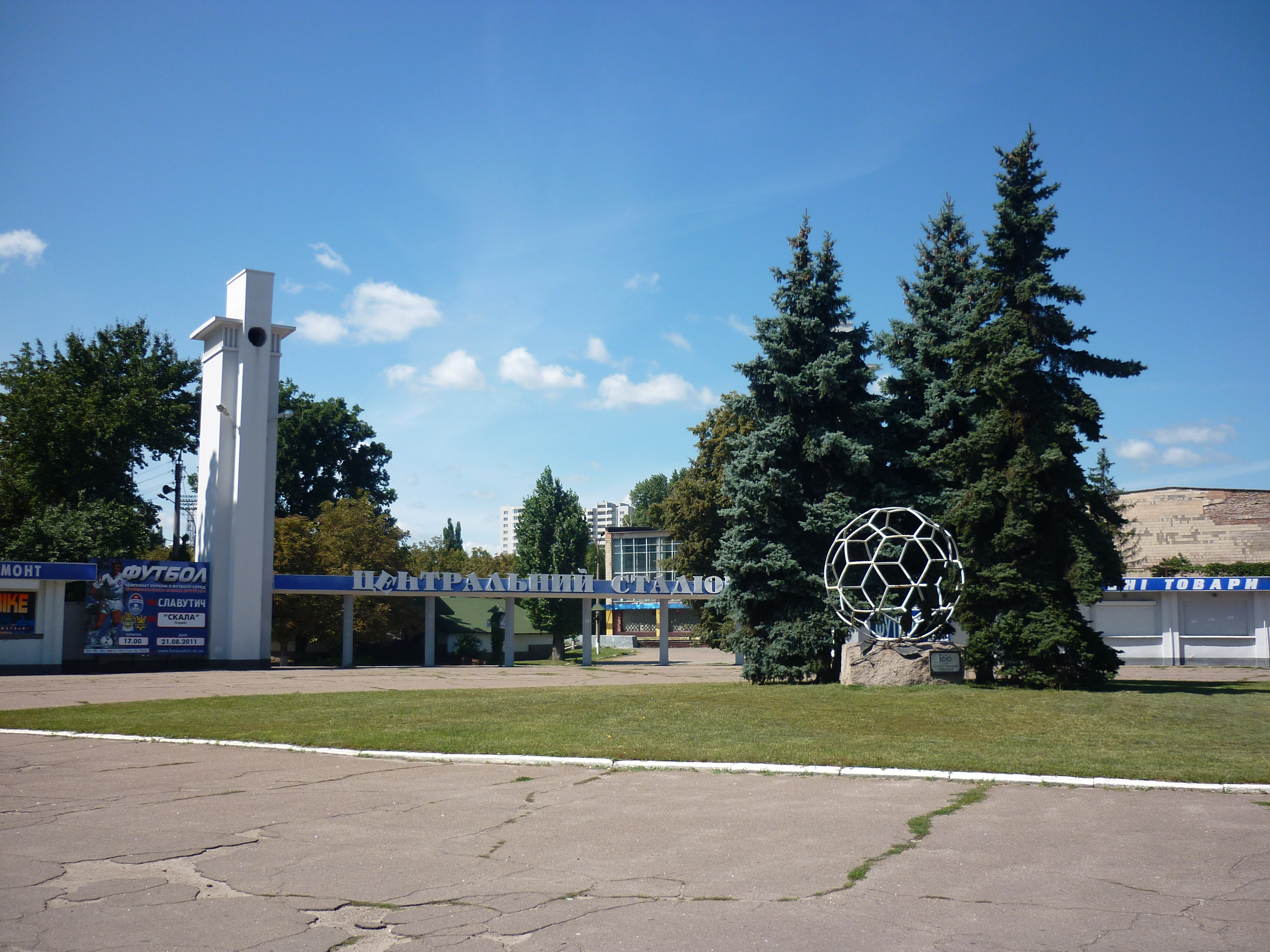
Entrance (2011)

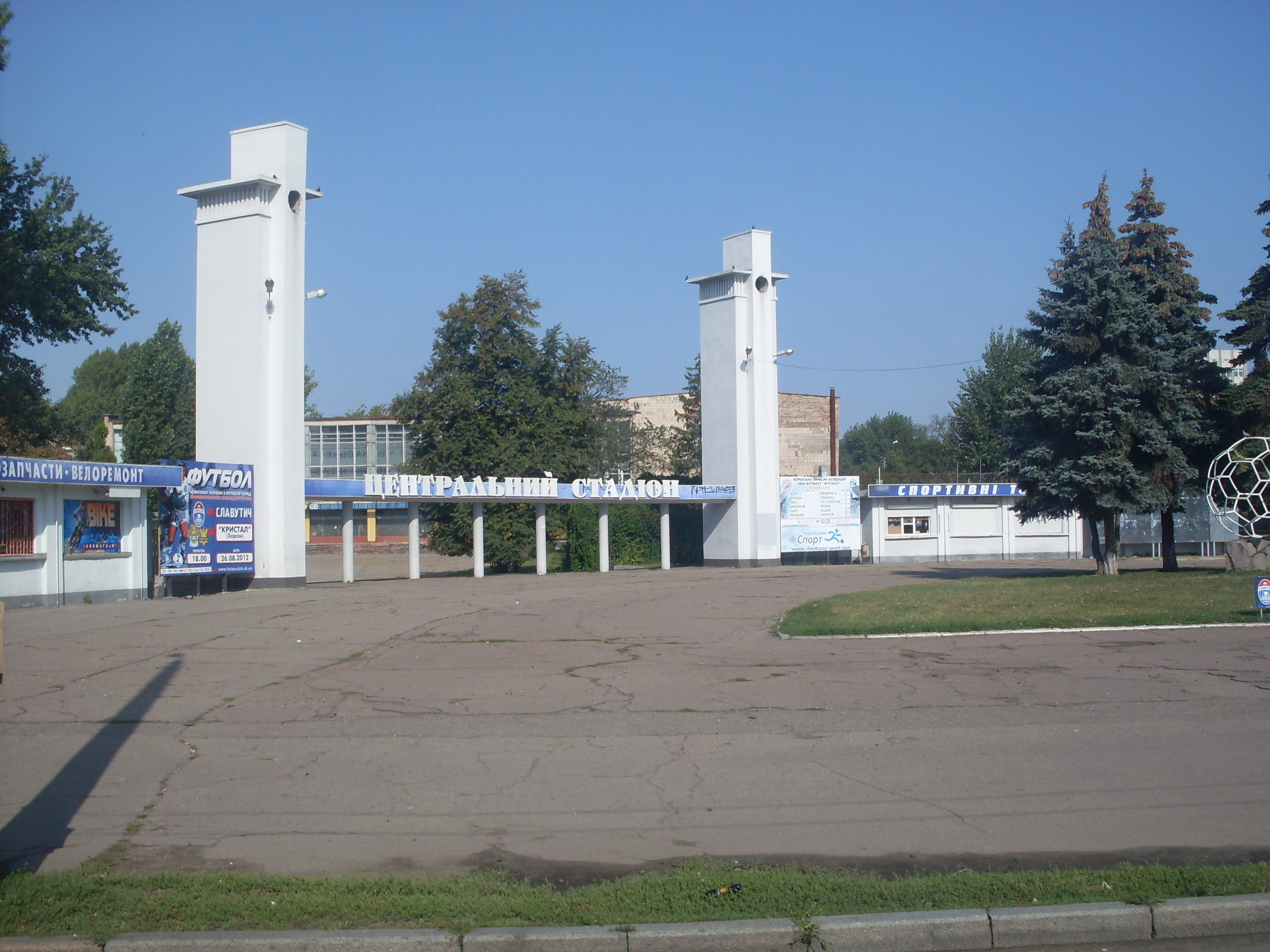
Entrance (2013)

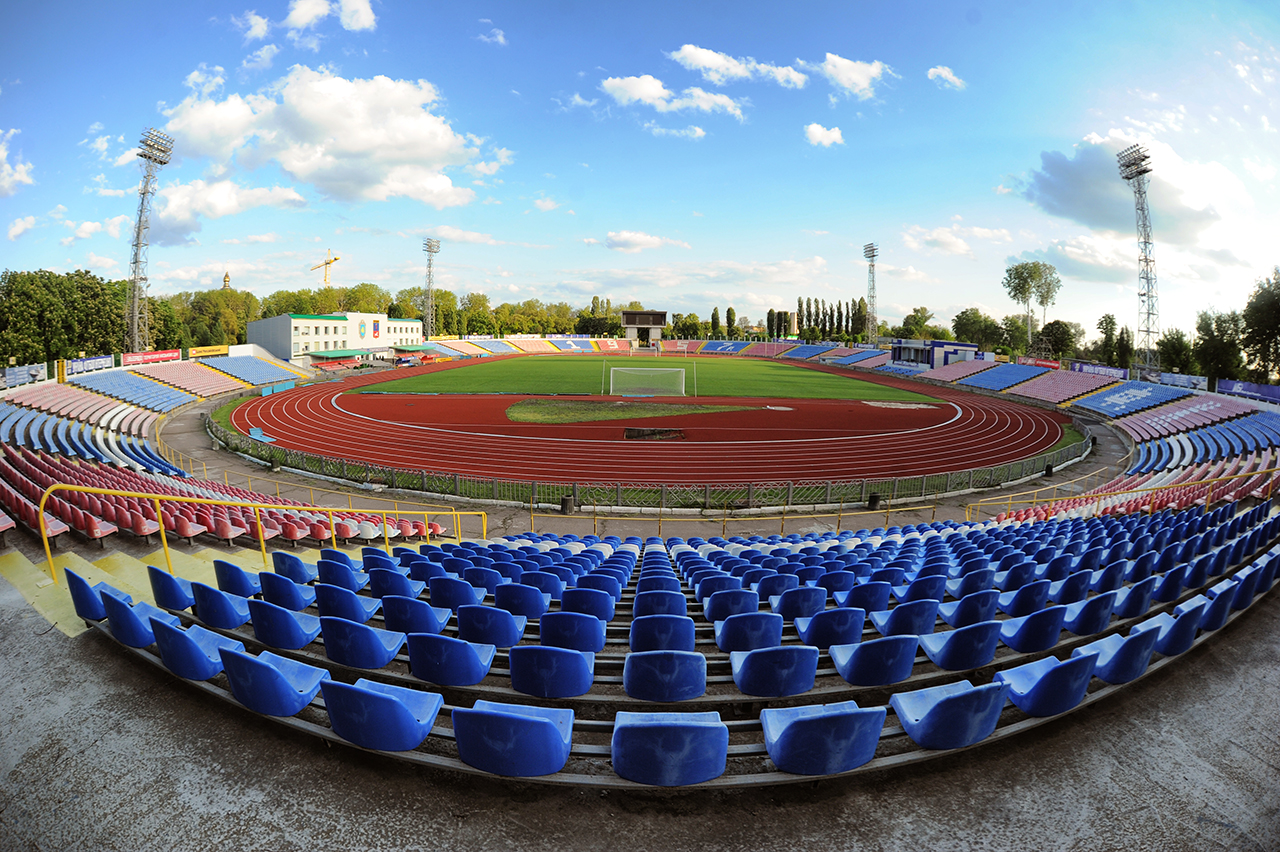
Panoramic view (2011)
