= Yevhen Sonin =

Ukrainian footballer and manager

Personal information
- Full name: Yevhen Yuriyovych Sonin
- Date of birth: 16 June 1974 (age 52)
- Place of birth: Dnipropetrovsk, Ukrainian SSR
- Height: 1.78 m (5 ft 10 in)
- Position: Forward

Youth career
- Dnipro-75 Dnipropetrovsk

Senior career*
Years	Team	Apps	(Gls)
1992	Obuvshchik Lida	27	(2)
1993	APK Azov	10	(1)
1994	Krylia Sovetov Samara	2	(0)
1994	Shakhtar Pavlohrad	12	(0)
1994	Metalurh Novomoskovsk	16	(2)
1995	Krylia Sovetov Samara	3	(1)
1996–1997	Mykolaiv	45	(15)
1997	Kryvbas Kryvyi Rih	7	(0)
1998	Dnipro Dnipropetrovsk	4	(0)
1998	→ Dnipro-2 Dnipropetrovsk	3	(0)
1998–1999	Torpedo Zaporizhzhia	16	(3)
2000	Zhemchuzhina Sochi	15	(5)
2002	Kristall Smolensk	15	(2)
2003	Hirnyk Kryvyi Rih	5	(2)
2003	Ordabasy	12	(1)
2005	Dynamo Makhachkala	19	(3)

Managerial career
- 2014: FC Dnipropetrovsk (amateur)
- * Club domestic league appearances and goals

Yevhen Yuriyovych Sonin (Ukrainian: Євген Юрійович Сонін; born 16 June 1974) is a former Ukrainian football player. In 2014, he managed an amateur club FC Dnipropetrovsk.
