= Havrylo Kachur =

Soviet footballer

Gabor Kachur
Personal information
- Full name: Havrylo Vasylyovych Kachur
- Date of birth: 11 March 1954 (age 72)
- Place of birth: Nove Davydkovo, Mukachevo Raion, Ukrainian SSR, Soviet Union
- Position: Defender

Youth career
- Meteor Mukacheve

Senior career*
Years	Team	Apps	(Gls)
1972	SKA Rostov-na-Donu		
1973	SKA Lviv		
1974	SC Lutsk		(0)
1975	FC Karpaty Lviv		
1975–1976	FC Bukovyna Chernivtsi	36	(2)
1977–1979	FC Chornomorets Odesa	54	(3)
1980	PFC Neftchi Baku	10	(0)
1980	FC Urozhai Kolchyno	2	(1)
1980–1981	FC Podillya Khmelnytskyi	51	(4)
1982	SKA Karpaty Lviv	32	(0)
1985–1988	FC Karpaty Mukacheve		
1988	FC Urozhai Kolchyno		

Managerial career
- 1992–1993: FC Karpaty Mukacheve (ass't)
- 1994–1995: FC Karpaty Mukacheve
- * Club domestic league appearances and goals

Havrylo Kachur (Ukrainian: Гаврило (Габор) Васильович Качур; 11 March 1954) is a former professional Soviet football defender and coach.

== Career ==
Havrylo Kachur began his adult football career in 1972 with the backup team of SKA (Rostov-on-Don), in which he scored 1 goal.

From 1973 to 1976, he played in the clubs SKA Lviv, SC Lutsk, FSC Bukovyna Chernivtsi and FC Karpaty Lviv.

In 1977, he joined the representative of the Soviet Top League FC Chornomorets Odesa. During his stay in Odesa in the USSR championship he played 54 matches and scored 3 goals, played 3 more matches in the USSR Cup.

In 1980, he moved to another representative of the Soviet Top League, Baku's Neftchi.

From 1980 to 1982, he played in the second league FC Podillya Khmelnytskyi (51 matches, 4 goals) and amateur club "Harvest" (Kolchyno).

In 1982, he moved to Lviv SKA-Karpaty, which played in the first league of the USSR championship.

From 1992 he worked as a coach, and from 1994 to 1995 he was a head coach of the club "Karpaty" (Mukachevo).
