= Viktor Udovenko =

Personal information
- Full name: Viktor Mykhailovych Udovenko
- Date of birth: 8 February 1947 (age 79)
- Place of birth: Kiev, Ukrainian SSR, Soviet Union
- Position: Goalkeeper

Youth career
- 1959–1964: FC Dynamo Kyiv

Senior career*
Years	Team	Apps	(Gls)
1965	FC Dynamo Kyiv	0	(0)
1965	→ FC Dynamo-2 Kyiv (loan)	4	(0)
1966	FC Torpedo Berdiansk	3	(0)
1967–1969	FC Dynamo Khmelnytskyi	36	(0)
1970–1972	FC Metalist Kharkiv	64	(0)
1973	FC Dnipro Dnipropetrovsk	0	(0)
1974–1976	FC Metalist Kharkiv	56	(0)

Managerial career
- 1977–1978: FC Metalist Kharkiv (team chief)
- 1987–1995: FC Metalist Kharkiv (ass't)
- 1996: FC Metalist Kharkiv
- 1996–2001: FC Metalist Kharkiv (goalie coach, vice-president)
- 2001: FC Metalist Kharkiv
- 2001–2004: FC Metalist Kharkiv (team chief)
- 2005–2010: FC Kharkiv (tech. director)
- * Club domestic league appearances and goals

Viktor Udovenko (Ukrainian: Виктор Михайлович Удовенко; 8 February 1947) is a former professional Soviet football goalkeeper and coach.

In 2011 he served as one of the Ukrainian Premier League officials.
