= Ivan Hamaliy =

Ukrainian footballer and coach (1956–2022)

Personal information
- Full name: Ivan Pavlovych Hamaliy
- Date of birth: 20 October 1956
- Place of birth: Hamaliivka, Pustomyty Raion, Ukrainian SSR, USSR
- Date of death: 18 December 2022 (aged 66)
- Place of death: Portugal
- Height: 1.76 m (5 ft 9 in)
- Position: Midfielder

Senior career*
Years	Team	Apps	(Gls)
1974	SC Lutsk		(0)
1977–1981	SKA Lviv	202	(63)
1982–1989	SKA Karpaty Lviv	301	(44)
1989	Karpaty Lviv	9	(0)
1990–1991	Miedź Legnica		
1991	Halychyna Drohobych	21	(5)
1991–1993	Stal Sanok		
1993	Krystal Chortkiv	21	(7)
1993	FC Lviv	11	(1)
1993–1994	Karpaty Lviv	20	(1)
1994–1995	Krystal Chortkiv	13	(0)
1995	Skify Lviv	8	(1)
1998	FC Sambir	6	(0)
1998	Halychyna Drohobych	5	(0)
1999	FC Etanol Storonybaby	9	(6)

Managerial career
- 1994–1995: Krystal Chortkiv (player-manager)
- 1997–1998: Karpaty Kamianka-Buzka
- * Club domestic league appearances and goals

Ivan Hamaliy (Ukrainian: Іван Павлович Гамалій; 20 October 1956 – 18 December 2022) was a Ukrainian professional football player and coach who played as a midfielder.

Hamaliy died in Portugal on 18 December 2022, at the age of 66.
