= Oleksandr Ishchenko =

Ukrainian football player and manager

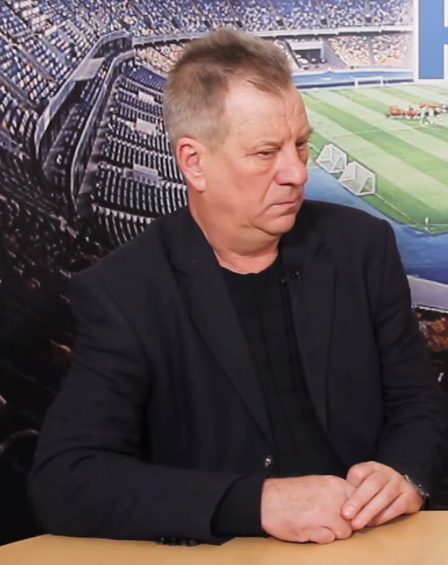

Personal information
- Full name: Oleksandr Oleksiyovych Ishchenko
- Date of birth: 3 September 1953 (age 73)
- Place of birth: Kremenchuk, Ukrainian SSR
- Height: 1.86 m (6 ft 1 in)
- Position: Defender

Team information
- Current team: Dynamo football school

Youth career
- Metalurh Zaporizhzhia

Senior career*
Years	Team	Apps	(Gls)
1970–1971	Metalurh Zaporizhzhia		
1971–1973	SKA Odesa/Zvezda Tiraspol		
1973–1975	Zirka Kirovohrad	49	(4)
1976–1980	Spartak Zhytomyr	163	(0)
1981–1984	Papirnyk Malyn		

Managerial career
- 1981–1984: Papirnyk Malyn (player-manager)
- 1985: Spartak Zhytomyr
- 1987–1989: Polissya Zhytomyr
- 1990–1991: Khimik Zhytomyr
- 1992: Polihraftekhnika Oleksandriya
- 1992–1993: Khimik Zhytomyr
- 1993–1997: Zirka-NIBAS Kirovohrad
- 1996–1997: Ukraine U21
- 1997–1998: Nyva Vinnytsia
- 1998–2000: Zirka Kirovohrad
- 2000–2001: Tavriya Simferopol
- 2001–2002: Prykarpattia Ivano-Frankivsk
- 2002–2003: Kryvbas Kryvyi Rih
- 2003–2004: Aktobe
- 2006–2007: Karpaty Lviv
- 2007: Karpaty Lviv
- 2007–2008: Illichivets Mariupol
- 2011–: Dynamo Kyiv (youth)
- * Club domestic league appearances and goals

Oleksandr Ishchenko (Ukrainian: Олександр Олексійович Іщенко, born 3 September 1953) is a former Ukrainian football player and manager who is currently the head coach of the Dynamo football school.

He played for SKA Odesa and FC Zirka Kirovohrad, and he coached the Ukraine national under-21 football team, FC Karpaty Lviv and FC Illichivets Mariupol.

== Honours ==
=== Player ===
- Cup of the Ukrainian SSR
  - Winner (2): 1973, 1975 (both Zirka Kirovohrad)

=== Coach ===
- UEFA European Under-21 Championship
  - Runner-up (1): 2006 (Ukraine)
