= Semen Osynovskyi =

Soviet footballer and coach

Personal information
- Full name: Semen Mendeleyevych Osynovskyi
- Date of birth: 25 September 1960 (age 66)
- Place of birth: Kara-Balta, Kyrgyz SSR, Soviet Union
- Position: Midfielder

Youth career
- Kara-Balta sports school
- Frunze sports school

Senior career*
Years	Team	Apps	(Gls)
1977–1983	FC Alga Frunze		
1984	JK Dünamo Tallinn		
1985–1987	SC Tavriya Simferopol	109	(26)
1988–1990	FC Alga Frunze	71	(11)
1991	FC Dostuk Sokuluk	2	(1)
1991	FC APK Rostov	4	(0)
1995	FC Dnipro Cherkasy	2	(0)

Managerial career
- 1992–1995: FC Dnipro Cherkasy
- 1995–1996: FC Krystal Chortkiv
- 1996: FC Prykarpattia Ivano-Frankivsk (ass't)
- 1997–1998: FC Cherkasy
- 1998: Al-Ittihad Club Tripoli
- 1999–2000: FC Kremin Kremenchuk
- 2001–2002: FC Vorskla-2 Poltava
- 2002: FC Polissya Zhytomyr
- * Club domestic league appearances and goals

Semen Osynovskyi (Ukrainian: Семен Менделеєвич Осиновський; 25 September 1960) is a former professional Soviet football midfielder and coach.
