= FC Dnipro Cherkasy =

- Full name: City Sports Club Dnipro Cherkasy
- Founded: 1955; 71 years ago 2018; 8 years ago
- Dissolved: 2009; 17 years ago 2023; 3 years ago
- Ground: Tsentralnyi Stadion, Cherkasy
- Capacity: 10,321
- Chairman: Ihor Kolomoyets
- League: none
- 2021–22: Ukrainian Second League, Group A, 11th of 15 (withdrew)
- Website: http://mskdnipro.com/
Home colours	Away colours

City Sports Club Dnipro Cherkasy (Ukrainian: Міський спортивний клуб Дніпро Черкаси) was a Ukrainian football team based in Cherkasy. Over its history the club has been dissolved and revived several times. The original club that existed 1955-1974 was dissolved following a financial scandal. After that the club again was dissolved and revived couple of more times.

In the fall of 2018 the administration of Cherkasy Tsentralny Stadion revived the club as MSC Dnipro Cherkasy.

On 21 June 2023 the 31st PFL Conference excluded several clubs that did not compete in the 2022–23 season and did not renew their membership.

== Team names ==
- 1955–1974: first club (18 seasons)
  - 1955–1956: FC Dynamo/Burevisnyk Cherkasy
  - 1956–1966: FC Kolhospnyk Cherkasy
  - 1967–1972: FC Dnipro Cherkasy
  - 1973–1974: FC Hranit Cherkasy
- 1975–2002: second club (26 seasons)
  - 1975–1997: FC Dnipro Cherkasy
  - 1997–2002: FC Cherkasy
- 2003–2009: third club (5 seasons)
  - 2003–2004: FC Cherkasy
  - 2004–2009: FC Dnipro Cherkasy
- 2018–2023: fourth club (4 seasons)
  - 2018–2023: FC Dnipro Cherkasy

== History overview ==
The Cherkasy city football club traces its heritage to 1947, when Cherkasy FC (ChFC) represented the city at republican football competitions (as part of Kyiv Oblast). The next year, the city was represented by an army team, Dom Ofitserov (DO). Upon the creation of the Cherkasy Oblast in 1954, the city of Cherkasy was represented in republican competitions by Torpedo.

In 1955, the city was represented in republican competitions by the local branch of Dynamo sports society, but in mid-season was replaced with another team member of Burevisnyk sports society. Burevisnyk is considered a direct predecessor of the latter, FC Dnipro. The club was established on 9 May 1955, the 10th anniversary of Victory Day. The original team kept its professional status for 44 years since acquiring it in 1958 and reacquired it in 2003 after the short-term disruption for the 2002/03 season. Over its history, Dnipro has already many times revived and dissolved. As a "team of masters" Kolhospnyk (predecessor of Kolos sports society), the club was admitted to the Soviet Class B competitions in 1958. In 1960, football competitions in Class B were organized, and Ukrainian clubs, as "teams of masters," played in their republican tournament known as Class B of the Ukrainian SSR.

In December 1957, after a series of friendlies, the football team Kolhospnyk Cherkasy was included in national competitions among teams of Class B. Such an unprecedented decision about inclusion of the Cherkasian football club in the championship was connected with the construction of the stadium, stands of which contained 27 sectors and a capacity of 15,000 spectators. Already in 1959, Kolhospnyk inscribed in its history its first feat when it became a winner of the IV International games among rural teams of socialist countries that took place in Bulgaria.

In 1967, the main Cherkasy team switched its name to Dnipro after the river on the banks of which the city of Cherkasy sits. Following another reorganization of the Soviet football competitions in 1970, republican Class B competitions were phased away, and the Soviet Class A was expanded to three divisions. Many teams of the former Ukrainian Class B were admitted to the Soviet Class A Second Group, which next year, in 1971, was renamed the Soviet Second League. Among those teams was Dnipro. However, in 1972, Dnipro was relegated to amateurs (republican competitions) where it was renamed to Hranyt and coached by former Dynamo player Vitaliy Khmelnytskyi in two seasons and returned to the Second League. Yet it did not stay there for too long, as the club was embroiled in a corruption scandal in 1974. This corruption case reached to be dealt at a level of the Central Committee of the Communist Party of Ukraine and feuilleton at the Muscovite newspaper "Pravda" under an eloquent title "Gild the leg".

Following the 1991 season, the team of masters "Dnipro" became bankrupt. The team's owner, local "Fotoprylad", became unable to keep the team. In place of the Dnipro team of masters was created FC Dnipro by the "Cherkaskyi biznes-tsentr" headed by Hryhoriy Kolomiyets. The reestablished club was also sponsored by the "Italiano in Ukraine".

The club was expelled from the PFL in the second half of the 2008–09 season due to failing to arrive at a scheduled fixture for the second time.

In 2017, there took place the transformation of the Sokil sports complex, which belonged to the defense industry company Fotoprylad and included the central stadium, into a city community company "Tsentralnyi Stadion". On 31 August 2018, based on the city community company "Tsentralnyi Stadion", there was established the municipal sports club "Dnipro". Among the first teams there was established football team which entered Ukrainian football under-19 competitions. Following the Russian aggression against Ukraine, number of MSC Dnipro members joined the Armed Forces of Ukraine among which were a head coach of rugby team, an assistant coach of female football team, and several others.

== Stadium ==
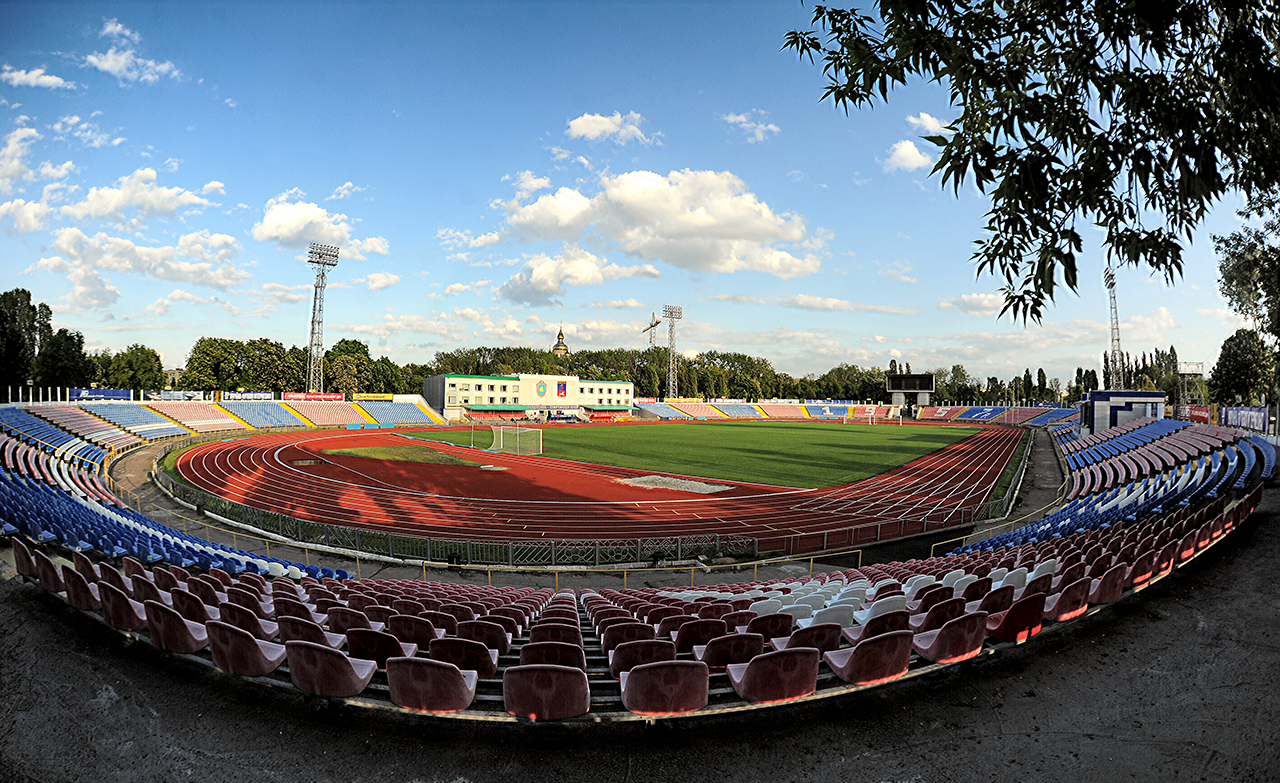
Tsentralnyi Stadion in Cherkasy

History of the club is closely entwined with history of central stadium in Cherkasy. Before 1957 in Cherkasy existed 10 stadiums with football fields the bigger being "Kharchovyk" (5,000), "Avanhard/Trud" (2,500), "Vodnyk" (1,500). Before the World War II on territory of Ukraine, all important football games in Cherkasy used to take place at Kharchovyk ("Food-provider") Stadium, however due to combat actions the stadium of Cherkasy Refined Sugar Factory was destroyed. Following the war and until early 1950s, the main city stadium became Vodnyk. In 1952 after debut of the Soviet Olympic team at the Olympics in Helsinki, the Communist Party of the Soviet Union made emphasis on mass involvement in sports. The archive documents show that on 15 September 1955 there were allocated 6 ha (15 acres) to local sports society "Kolhospnyk" in connection of building a local central stadium in place of Vodnyk and in two years the city authorities majestically opened a fine football arena of VSS "Kolhospnyk" with capacity of 15,000 spectators. On 9 November 1957 the new stadium hosted a first exhibition game between Dinamo (from Kyiv) and local Kolhospnyk.

On 9 November thousands of Cherkasy residents filled stands of the new stadium. Here took place first exhibition game between Kyivan Dinamo and Kolhospnyk Cherkasy. Cherkasy players demonstrated strong will to victory, played with full dedication. Yet they still lack teamwork, technique, and skill to finish their combinations with a shot on goal. The game, with the score 3:1, was won by more experienced masters of the ball, the Kyivans.

— Cherkaska Pravda, 11 November 1957

== Colours ==
Traditionally the club colours are white, red and blue.

Former logo

== Honors ==
- Ukrainian Druha Liha
  - Winners (2): 1992–93, 2005–06 Group B
- Ukrainian football championship among amateurs
  - Winners (2): 1973, 1987
- Cherkasy Oblast Football Championship
  - Winners (2): 1956, 1957

== Players ==
As of 18 July 2023 Note: Flags indicate national team as defined under FIFA eligibility rules; some limited exceptions apply. Players may hold more than one non-FIFA nationality.

No.	Pos.	Nation	Player
2	DF	UKR	Yehor Pinchuk
3	DF	UKR	Pavlo Shostka
4	DF	UKR	Vladyslav Barskyi
5	DF	UKR	Yevheniy Onyshchenko
8	MF	UKR	Maksym Ivakhno (on loan from Oleksandriya)
9	MF	UKR	Kyrylo Bystrytskyi
10	FW	UKR	Yaroslav Savisko
11	MF	UKR	Yuriy Ivanochko (on loan from LNZ Cherkasy)
15	MF	UKR	Bohdan Vinichenko
17	MF	UKR	Danylo Chyzhyk
18	MF	UKR	Oleh Ratushnyi

No.	Pos.	Nation	Player
20	MF	UKR	Ihor Duvnyak
22	DF	UKR	Bohdan Mykhalchenko
23	MF	UKR	Maksym Chernenko
24	FW	UKR	Viktor Martyan
30	MF	UKR	Serhiy Bida
31	GK	UKR	Dmytro Panchenko
33	GK	UKR	Andriy Lyenchikov
44	MF	UKR	Markiyan Pyrih
69	DF	UKR	Anatoliy Klyus
77	MF	UKR	Vladyslav Pasechnyuk
79	GK	UKR	Artem Deneha

== League and cup history ==
=== Soviet Union ===
Season	Div.	Pos.	Pl.	W	D	L	GS	GA	P	Domestic Cup	Other	Notes
FC Torpedo Cherkasy
1954	4th	6	10	1	1	8	6	35	3			
FC Burevisnyk Cherkasy
1955	4th	8	14	0	5	9	12	43	5			(Note: Adopted results of Dynamo that competed in the first half)
1956	4th	2	14	10	1	3	24	13	21			
FC Kolhospnyk Cherkasy
1957	4th	2	10	2	6	2	17	14	10			Promoted
1958	2nd	13	30	5	11	14	22	35	21			
1959	2nd	4	28	14	8	6	36	24	36			
1960	2nd	12	32	8	10	14	31	46	26			
1961	2nd	16	34	9	10	15	25	47	28			
1962	2nd	6	24	8	12	4	27	21	28			to finals
1962	2nd	8	10	5	3	2	19	13	13			Relegated
1963	3rd	6	38	19	8	11	50	35	46			to finals
1963	3rd	12	2	1	0	1	2	3	2			
1964	3rd	5	30	11	12	7	32	24	34			to finals
1964	3rd	15	10	4	3	3	8	6	11			
1965	3rd	8	30	10	10	10	30	30	30			to finals
1965	3rd	19	10	7	2	1	14	8	16			
1966	3rd	12	38	11	14	13	24	31	36			to finals
1966	3rd	23	withdrew									
FC Dnipro Cherkasy
1967	3rd	2	40	19	12	9	46	22	50			to finals
1967	3rd	6	5	1	0	4	4	10	2			
1968	3rd	16	40	10	15	15	33	41	35			
1969	3rd	19	40	8	13	19	21	36	29			
1970	3rd	15	40	15	14	11	49	42	44			
1971	3rd	24	50	9	15	26	28	69	33			Relegated
1972	4th	6	14	4	3	7	9	15	11			
FC Hranyt Cherkasy
1973	4th	1	14	11	2	1	27	7	24			to finals
1973	4th	1	4	3	1	0	8	3	7			Promoted
1974	3rd	16	38	9	10	13	32	49	34			Expelled
FC Dnipro Cherkasy
1975	4th	7	12	0	2	10	9	25	2			
1976	4th	9	20	4	4	12	20	37	12			Promoted
1977	3rd	23	44	8	10	26	26	69	26			
1978	3rd	18	44	11	12	21	29	53	34			
1979	3rd	14	46	14	13	19	38	49	41			
1980	3rd	17	44	13	9	22	43	50	35			
1981	3rd	20	44	13	11	20	44	55	37			
1982	3rd	8	46	21	12	13	54	42	54			
1983	3rd	25	50	13	13	24	35	61	39			
1984	3rd	26	38	3	9	26	11	55	15			Relegated
1985	4th	5	14	3	5	6	11	29	11			
1986	4th	8	16	3	3	10	14	30	9			
1987	4th	1	16	12	1	3	35	10	25			to finals
1987	4th	1	5	4	1	0	10	2	9			Promoted
1988	3rd	22	50	16	9	25	57	77	41			
1989	3rd	17	52	15	16	21	64	79	46			Relegated
1990	3rd (lower)	16	36	8	7	21	26	48	23			
1991	3rd (lower)	18	50	17	10	23	47	59	44			

=== Ukraine ===
Dnipro joined the Ukrainian competitions upon finishing the 1991 Soviet Lower Second League, Zone 1 season.

Season	Div.	Pos.	Pl.	W	D	L	GS	GA	P	Domestic Cup	Europe	Notes
FC Dnipro Cherkasy
1992	2nd "A"	12	26	9	4	13	22	27	22	1/32 finals		Relegated
1992–93	3rd	1	34	20	9	5	59	33	49	1/64 finals		Promoted
1993–94	2nd	5	38	19	7	12	56	39	45	1/32 finals		
1994–95	2nd	20	42	11	8	23	33	48	41	1/64 finals		
1995–96	2nd	20	42	6	4	32	26	91	22	1/32 finals		
1996–97	2nd	17	46	16	7	23	46	78	55	1/64 finals		
FC Cherkasy
1997–98	2nd	7	42	19	11	12	51	41	68	1/64 finals		
1998–99	2nd	4	38	24	4	10	68	42	76	1/16 finals		
1999–00	2nd	3	34	17	8	9	48	34	39	1/16 finals		
2000–01	2nd	16	34	19	7	18	35	5'	34	1/16 finals		Relegated
2001–02	3rd "B"	11	34	13	7	14	49	36	16	1/32 finals		dissolved
revived as FC Cherkasy
2003	4th	2	8	6	1	1	17	6	19			
2003–04	3rd "C"	8	30	11	7	12	40	40	40	1/32 finals		
FC Dnipro Cherkasy
2004–05	3rd "B"	3	28	20	5	3	48	15	65	1/8 finals		
2005–06	3rd "B"	1	24	18	3	3	49	22	57	1/16 finals		Promoted
2006–07	2nd	15	36	10	9	17	31	46	39	1/16 finals		
2007–08	2nd	18	38	8	17	13	43	43	35	1/32 finals		Relegated
2008–09	3rd "A"	7	32	17	5	10	37	20	50	1/64 finals		Expelled
club idle 2009–2019
2019–20	4th "B"	9_{/12}	22	6	3	13	22	48	21			Admitted to Second League
2020–21	3rd "B"											
2021–22	3rd "A"											Suspended due to war

== Head coaches ==
- (Ukraine) Volodymyr Muntyan (1998–2000)
- (Ukraine) Anatoliy Zayayev (2001)
- (Ukraine) Oleksandr Shcherbakov (2004–2005)
- (Ukraine) Serhiy Morozov (2005–2007)
- (Ukraine) Oleksandr Ryabokon (2007–2008)
- (Ukraine) Anatoliy Bezsmertnyi (2008–2009)

== Head coaches ==
- Ihor Kolomoyets
- Albert Zalyalutdinov

== Reserves and academy ==
=== Cherkasy-2 ===
Cherkasy-2 was a Ukrainian football team based in Cherkasy, Ukraine. The team played only in the 2000–01 Ukrainian Second League season before being disbanded. It served as a junior team for the FC Dnipro Cherkasy franchise.

== See also ==
- FC Cherkaskyi Dnipro – formation of new club in 2010 which entered the professional ranks in 2011 and has historically tied itself to this former club.
