= Serhiy Marusyn =

Ukrainian footballer (born 1958)

Personal information
- Full name: Serhiy Viktorovych Marusyn
- Date of birth: April 1, 1958 (age 68)
- Place of birth: Kanadei, Ulyanovsk Oblast, Russia SFSR, Soviet Union
- Position: Midfielder

Youth career
- 1977/76: Dnipro Dnipropetrovsk

Senior career*
Years	Team	Apps	(Gls)
1977–1986	SKA Odesa		
- FC Metallurg Aldan

Managerial career
- 1987–1992: SKA Odesa
- 1994–97: SC Odesa
- 1997/98: FC Polihraftekhnika
- amateur level
- * Club domestic league appearances and goals

Serhiy Marusyn (born April 1, 1958, in Kanadei, Ulyanovsk Oblast, Soviet Union) is a Ukrainian coach and a former Soviet footballer the best known for his participation with the Odesa Army Club.

Born in the Volga region, Marusyn was growing up in Dnipropetrovsk.
