= Vadym Plotnykov =

Ukrainian footballer

Personal information
- Full name: Vadym Vyacheslavovych Plotnykov
- Date of birth: 12 April 1968 (age 58)
- Place of birth: Kirovsk, Ukrainian SSR
- Height: 1.70 m (5 ft 7 in)
- Position: Forward

Senior career*
Years	Team	Apps	(Gls)
1991–1992	Stakhanovets Stakhanov	73	(19)
1992–2001	Stal Alchevsk	311	(109)

Managerial career
- 2000–2008: Stal Alchevsk (assistant)
- 2008–2009: Stal Alchevsk (caretaker)
- 2009: Stal Alchevsk
- 2009–2013: Stal Alchevsk (assistant)
- 2013–2014: Stal Alchevsk
- * Club domestic league appearances and goals

Vadym Vyacheslavovych Plotnykov (Ukrainian: Вадим Вячеславович Плотников; born 12 April 1968) is a Ukrainian former footballer. He worked as a head coach of FC Stal Alchevsk in the Ukrainian First League.

There are argument whether he is the best top scorer of Ukrainian First League. With 118 goals Plotnykov is listed on top of the all-time list, however some statistics trackers insist that some goals were added to him without confirmation and he should be sharing his title with Serhiy Chuichenko.
