= Anatoliy Volobuyev =

Ukrainian footballer (born 1953)

Personal information
- Full name: Anatoliy Ivanovych Volobuyev
- Date of birth: 16 June 1953 (age 73)
- Place of birth: Voroshylovsk, Ukrainian SSR, Soviet Union
- Position: Forward

Youth career
- 1969: Komunarets Komunarsk

Senior career*
Years	Team	Apps	(Gls)
1970	Komunarets Komunarsk	18	(0)
1971	Shakhtar Kadiivka		
1972	Horyn Rivne		
1973	Shakhtar Kadiivka	5	(0)
1973–1975	SKA Kyiv		
1976–1979	Kolos Mezhyrich		
1980–1981	Mziuri Gali		
1981–1982	Dinamo Zugdidi		

Managerial career
- 1985–1988: Budivelnyk Komunarsk
- 1989–1998: Stal Alchevsk
- 2002–2006: Stal Alchevsk
- 2007: Zorya Luhansk (vice-president)
- 2008–2009: Zorya Luhansk
- 2009–2013: Stal Alchevsk
- * Club domestic league appearances and goals

Anatoliy Ivanovych Volobuyev (Ukrainian: Анатолій Іванович Волобуєв; born 16 June 1953) is a Ukrainian former football player, and a head-coach of couple Ukrainian teams in the Premier and First leagues. He holds a record for the most games managed a club in Persha Liha (Ukrainian First League).

== Playing career ==
Volobyuev started to play football back in 1964. His first coach was Mykola Haribov. His playing career began in 1969 when he was training with the main city team (Kommunarets). It was until the next year when he was actively involved in the team playing for it in Class B (Soviet Second League) competitions. In 1971 when Class B was phasing away, Volobuyev moved to Shakhtar Kadiyivka. His military obligation, he served by playing in SKA Kiev in 1973–1975.

In 1976 Volobuyev joined the newly formed football team Kolos Mezhyrich (near Pavlohrad) which represented the local collective farm named after the 22nd Party Congress. After few seasons he moved to the Georgian SSR where he played for teams from western Georgia. In 1983 at age of 30, Volobuyev was forced to retire due to his injury of meniscus.

== Coaching career ==
Soon after his retirement Volobuyev became physical fitness (physical culture) instructor at the "Kommunarskstroy" (a Soviet "trust" company). In 1983, in Alchevsk (at that time Kommunarsk) was created second football team (after Kommunarets) Budivelnyk (Stroitel). In 1986 Volobuyev graduated the University of Luhansk as a teacher of physical fitness. In 1989 the original factory team Kommunarets of Alchevsk Metallurgical Complex was disbanded and the factory adopted Stroitel which changed its name to Stal. For most of his career, Volobuyev was involved with Stal Alchevsk from 1988. He led the team from city competitions to a professional football club which reached the Ukrainian Premier League.

Before spending a season as manager of Zorya Luhansk in the Ukrainian Premier League Volobuyev held the position of Vice-President of the Professional Football League of Ukraine in 2005.

He was hired back as head coach of Stal Alchevsk in November 2009.

== Political career ==
In 2010 Volobuyev was elected to the Luhansk Oblast Council (from the Alchevsk electoral district).
