= Serhiy Chuichenko =

Ukrainian footballer (born 1968)

Personal information
- Date of birth: 25 October 1968 (age 58)
- Place of birth: Kharkiv, Soviet Union
- Height: 1.80 m (5 ft 11 in)
- Position: Forward

Senior career*
Years	Team	Apps	(Gls)
1991	Druzhba Budyonnovsk	27	(0)
1992	Chementnik Balakliya		
1993	APK Azov	3	(0)
1993–1994	Polihraftechnika Oleksandria	57	(39)
1995	Dnipro Dnipropetrovsk	4	(0)
1995	Polihraftechnika Oleksandria	36	(26)
1996–1998	Vorskla Poltava	70	(42)
1997–1998	→ Vorskla-2 Poltava	12	(7)
1998	→ Köpetdag Aşgabat (loan)	0	(0)
1999	Metallurg Lipetsk	18	(3)
2000	Naftovyk Okhtyrka	14	(2)
2000	→ Elektron Romny (loan)	1	(1)
2000–2002	Polihraftechnika Oleksandria	71	(31)
2003	Metalist Kharkiv	28	(5)

Managerial career
- FC Kharkiv (administrator)
- * Club domestic league appearances and goals

Serhiy Chuichenko (Ukrainian: Сергій Чуйченко; born 25 October 1968) is the Soviet and Ukrainian professional footballer.

== Career ==
Chuichenko is a record holder together with Vadym Plotnikov (FC Stal Alchevsk) for goals scored in the Ukrainian First League with 117 goals. Chuichenko has another record for goals scored in a single season 36 (1995–96). Around that time he was a leading scorer in the First League for couple of seasons.

In 1998, Chuichenko was loaned to Turkmenistan club Köpetdag Aşgabat as a reinforcement for Asian Cup Winners' Cup. He was drafted into the Turkmenistan national team after becoming naturalized, but was not capped for the team.
