= Yuriy Koval =

Ukrainian association football coach

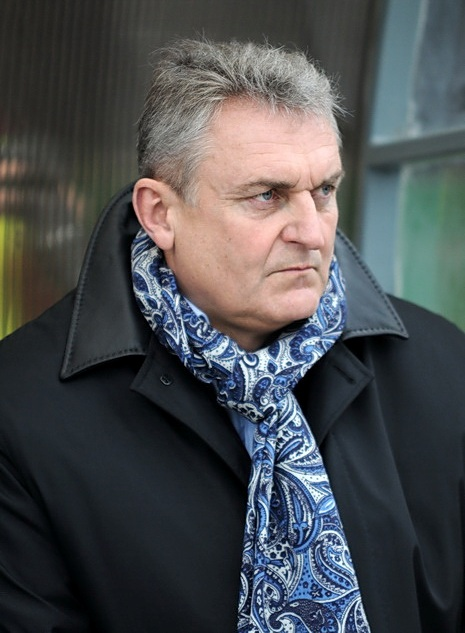
- Koval in 2009

Personal information
- Full name: Yuriy Hryhorovych Koval
- Date of birth: 29 April 1958 (age 68)
- Place of birth: Dilijan, Armenian SSR
- Position: Midfielder

Team information
- Current team: Zorya Luhansk (sporting director)

Senior career*
Years	Team	Apps	(Gls)
1980–1989	Shakhtar Oleksandriya		

Managerial career
- 1980–1990: DYuSSh-2 Oleksandriya
- 1991–1992: Polihraftekhnika Oleksandriya (assistant)
- 1992–1994: Polihraftekhnika Oleksandriya
- 1995: Nyva Vinnytsia (assistant)
- 1995: Kryvbas Kryvyi Rih
- 1996: Khimik Sievierodonetsk
- 1996–1997: Polihraftekhnika Oleksandriya
- 1998: Kremin Kremenchuk
- 2000–2004: Zirka Kirovohrad
- 2004–2006: Zorya Luhansk
- 2007–2008: Nyva Ternopil
- 2008–2009: Oleksandriya
- 2009: Zorya Luhansk
- 2010–: Zorya Luhansk (sporting director)
- 2011–2017: Zorya Luhansk (assistant)
- * Club domestic league appearances and goals

Yuriy Hryhorovych Koval (Ukrainian: Юрій Григорович Коваль; born 29 April 1958) is a Ukrainian professional football coach and former player.

On 21 January 2010, Koval was appointed as new the Director of sport for club Zorya Luhansk in Ukrainian Premier League.
