= FC Shakhtar Makiivka =

Ukrainian football club

FC Shakhtar Makiivka was a Ukrainian football club from Makiivka, Donetsk Oblast.

== History ==
The club was established in 1981 Bazhanovets Makiivka representing the Bazhanov coal mine of the State mining enterprise Makiyivvuhol (Makeyevugol). From 1992 until 1999 participated in professional competitions in Ukraine.

In 1995 it was renamed Shakhtar Makiivka after another club with the same name, but which represented another mine "Kholodna Balka" also belonging to Makiyivvuhol. Also, the Makiivka Metallurgical Plant had its football club Kirovets Makiivka which during the Soviet period competed at professional level.

== Honours ==
- Ukrainian Second League
  - Winners (1): 1992 (shared; Transition League)
- Donetsk Oblast Football Championship
  - Winners (3): 1982, 1985, 1986

== League and cup history ==
| Season | Div. | Pos. | Pl. | W | D | L | GS | GA | P | Domestic Cup | Europe | | Notes |
|---|---|---|---|---|---|---|---|---|---|---|---|---|---|
| 1992 | 3rd | 1st | 16 | 10 | 3 | 3 | 25 | 8 | 23 | – | – | – | Bazhanovets |

== See also ==
- Bazhanov coal mine
- FC Makiyivvuhillya Makiyivka
