= 2006–07 Ukrainian Cup =

Kubok Ukrainy

Tournament details
- Country: Ukraine
- Dates: 11 August 2006 – 27 May 2007
- Teams: 59

Final positions
- Champions: Dynamo Kyiv (9th title)
- Runners-up: Shakhtar Donetsk

The 2006–07 Ukrainian Cup was the 16th annual edition of Ukraine's football knockout competition, the Ukrainian Cup. The winner of this competition was Dynamo Kyiv which also was defending its title.

This season saw return of amateur teams to participate in the competition for the first time since 1995.

== Team allocation ==
Fifty-nine teams entered the competition

=== Distribution ===
	Teams entering in this round	Teams advancing from previous round
Round of 64 (54 teams)	11 participants of the Supreme League (lower seeded); 19 participants of the First League; 23 participants of the Second League; 1 participant of the Amateur Cup finalist (Khimmash Korosten)	
Tournament proper (32 teams)	5 participants of the Premier League (higher seeded)	27 winners from the second qualifying round

Note: Winner of the 2005 Amateur Cup of Ukraine FC Pivdenstal Yenakieve was replaced by FC Khimmash Korosten

=== Round and draw dates ===
All draws held at FFU headquarters (Building of Football) in Kyiv unless stated otherwise.

Round	Draw date	Game date	
Round	Draw date	First leg	Second leg
Round of 64	?	11–12 August 2006	
Round of 32	?	19–20 September 2006	
Round of 16	?	25 October 2006	
Quarter-finals	?	1–2 December 2006	9–10 December 2006
Semi-finals	?	18 March 2007	9 May 2007
Final	27 May 2007 at NSC Olimpiyskyi, Kyiv		

== Competition Schedule ==
=== Round of 64 (1/32) ===
The First Round took place on August 11, 2006. However, the match between Dniester Ovidiopol and Metalurh Donetsk took place on August 12. All clubs have participated except Dynamo, Shakhtar, Chornomorets, Dnipro, and Metalurh Z. that received a bye in this round.

11 August 2006
17:00 LST

Hirnik Kryvyi Rih (2L)	2–5 (a.e.t.)	(PL) Illychivets Mariupol
Chudak 45' (pen.); Pashkovsky 87'; Pashkovsky (yellow card) 49' (yellow-red card) 88'	Report	Mazurenko 23'; Tsykhmeistruk 68'; Levyha 93', 98'; Pukanych 95'

Zhovtneva Mine Stadium, Kryvyi Rih
Attendance: 800
Referee: Ihor Podushkin (Kharkiv)
11 August 2006
18:00 LST

Hirnyk-Sport Komsomolsk (2L)	1–2	(PL) Metalist Kharkiv
Malinochka 11'	Report	Rykun 59'; Davydov 78'

Yunist Stadium, Komsomolsk
Attendance: 2,500
Referee: Yevhen Venher (Kyiv)
11 August 2006
18:00 LST

Bukovyna Chernivtsi (2L)	0–3	(PL) Tavriya Simferopol
	Report	Junior Godoi 2' (pen.); Ljubenović 30'; Kovpak 45'

Bukovyna Stadium, Chernivtsi
Attendance: 1,200
Referee: Yevhen Herenda (Kalush)
11 August 2006
18:00 LST

Oleksandriya (1L)	0–2	(PL) Vorskla Poltava
	Report	Kondratyuk 18'; Grumić 90+2'

Nika Stadium, Oleksandriya
Attendance: 1,500
Referee: Oleh Zubaryev (Donetsk)
11 August 2006
17:00 LST

Nafkom Brovary (2L)	0–2	(PL) Stal Alchevsk
	Report	Hrybanov 51'; Gómez 63'

Spartak Stadium, Brovary
Attendance: 130
Referee: Oleksandr Tsyhankov (Ternopil)
11 August 2006
17:00 LST

Khimik Krasnoperekopsk (2L)	2–1 (a.e.t.)	(PL) Arsenal Kyiv
Sharpar 3'; Shakhov 100'	Report	Holovko 14'

Khimik Stadium, Krasnoperekopsk
Attendance: 2,500
Referee: Viktor Shvetsov (Odesa)
11 August 2006
17:00 LST

Lokomotiv Dvorichna (2L)	0–2	(PL) Kharkiv
	Report	Ibrahimov 57'; Sytnyk 80'

Lokomotyv Stadium, Kupiansk
Attendance: 800
Referee: Vyacheslav Zhukov (Donetsk)
11 August 2006
18:00 LST

Mykolaiv (1L)	0–1	(PL) Kryvbas Kryvyi Rih
	Report	Epureanu 7'

Central Stadium, Mykolaiv
Attendance: 700
Referee: Yevhen Abrosymov (Bilhorod-Dnistrovskyi Raion)
11 August 2006
17:30 LST

Yednist Plysky (2L)	0–1	(PL) Zorya Luhansk
	Report	Kyrylov 88'

Yednist Stadium, Plysky
Attendance: 1,500
Referee: Serhiy Berezka (Kyiv)
11 August 2006
18:00 LST

Knyazha Shchaslyve (2L)	0–2	(PL) Karpaty Lviv
	Report	Batista 4', 63'

Kolos Stadium, Boryspil
Attendance: 650
Referee: Volodymyr Sirenko (Simferopol)
11 August 2006
18:00 LST

Naftovyk Dolyna (2L)	0–1	(PL) Volyn Lutsk
	Report	Stepanov 31'; Alozie (penalty missed)

Naftovyk Stadium, Dolyna
Attendance: 1,000
Referee: Serhiy Zadiran (Dnipropetrovsk)
11 August 2006
17:30 LST

Khimmash Korosten (AM)	1–3	(PL) Zakarpattia Uzhhorod
Denysyuk 44' (pen.); Horbachenko (yellow card) 17' (yellow-red card) 65'	Report	Kopolovets 31'; Podrobakha 58'; Danayev 76'

Spartak Stadium, Korosten
Attendance: 2,000
Referee: Yevhen Aranovsky (Kyiv Oblast)
11 August 2006
17:00 LST

Fakel Ivano-Frankivsk (2L)	0–1	(PL) Obolon Kyiv
	Report	Slobodyan (penalty missed) 5'; Malysh 62'

Stadium of Institute of Oil and Gas, Ivano-Frankivsk
Attendance: 500
Referee: Ihor Pokydko (Poltava)
11 August 2006
17:00 LST

PFC Sevastopol (2L)	2–0	(PL) Naftovyk Okhtyrka
Mazurenko 61'; Horbanyov 77'	Report

Sports Complex Sevastopol, Sevastopol
Attendance: 2,000
Referee: Viktor Denysyuk (Fastiv)
11 August 2006
17:00 LST

Veres Rivne (2L)	0–2	(PL) Lviv
	Report	Baranets 6'; Voytovych 79' (pen.)

Avanhard Stadium, Orzhiv
Attendance: 300
Referee: Anton Tyutyun (Kyiv Oblast)
11 August 2006
17:00 LST

Olimpik Donetsk (2L)	4–2 (a.e.t.)	(1L) Podillya Khmelnytskyi
Ulanov 29'; Solodkyi 86', 103'; Khomutov 93'	Report	Kovalenko 45+2'; Mandzyuk 72'

Olimp Stadium, Donetsk
Attendance: 300
Referee: Yuriy Vaks (Simferopol)
11 August 2006
18:00 LST

Inter Boyarka (2L)	0–5	(1L) Stal Dniprodzerzhynsk
	Report	Kovalevsky 7'; Vizyonok 48' (pen.); Sytnik 57'; Ilyashov 82'; Liluashvili 89'

SC Obukhiv Stadium, Obukhiv
Attendance: 150
Referee: Yuriy Hrysyo (Lviv)
11 August 2006
16:30 LST

Arsenal Kharkiv (2L)	1–2 (a.e.t.)	(1L) Krymteplitsia Molodizhne
Shayenko 43'	Report	Hryshchenko 34'; Monakhov 94'

Arsenal-Bavaria Stadium, Kharkiv
Attendance: 1,500
Referee: Yuriy Mozharovsky (Lviv)
11 August 2006
18:00 LST

Dnipro Cherkasy (1L)	1–0	(1L) Spartak Ivano-Frankivsk
Pakholyuk 75'	Report

Central Stadium, Cherkasy
Attendance: 1,500
Referee: Orest Shmyhelsky (Lviv)
11 August 2006
17:00 LST

Tytan Armyansk (2L)	2–1	(1L) Helios Kharkiv
Zahorodniy 11'; Stolyarchuk 78'	Report	Danchenko 53'

Khimik Stadium, Armyansk
Attendance: 3,000
Referee: Oleksandr Derdo (Odesa)
11 August 2006
17:00 LST

Hazovyk-KhGV Kharkiv (2L)	3–5 (a.e.t.)	(1L) Dynamo-IhroServis Simferopol
Bobrov 22'; Syvukha 48', 66'; Shulha (penalty missed) 108'	Report	Melnyk 3'; Bobal 40', 111' (pen.); Morozov 78', 103'

Hazovyk Stadium, Krasnokutsk
Attendance: 700
Referee: Volodymyr Holovko (Dnipropetrovsk)
11 August 2006
17:00 LST

Kremin Kreminchuk (2L)	0–2	(1L) Enerhetyk Burstyn
	Report	Veretynsky 68', 74'

Politekhnyk Stadium, Kremenchuk
Attendance: 800
Referee: Yevhen Kotenko (Sumy)

11 August 2006	Yavir Krasnopillya (2L)	1–0	(1L) CSKA Kyiv	Krasnopillia, Sumy Oblast
17:00 LST	Buhayov 72'	[ Report]		Stadium: Kolos Stadium; Attendance: 700; Referee: Vadym Nesterenko (Donetsk)

11 August 2006	Feniks-Illichovets Kalinine (2L)	1–2	(1L) Borysfen Boryspil	Kalinino, Crimea
18:00 LST	Kozhemiakin 23'	[ Report]	Zavorotniuk 87'; Mostovyi 90' (pen.)	Stadium: Feniks Stadium; Attendance: 500; Referee: Mykola Danylenko (Berdiansk)

11 August 2006	Olkom Melitopol (2L)	4–1 (a.e.t.)	(1L) Spartak Sumy	Melitopol
17:30 LST	Kapusta 18', 104' (pen.), 106', 118'	[ Report]	Krivoshey 52'; Shevchenko (yellow card) 38' (yellow-red card) 59'	Stadium: Spartak Stadium; Attendance: 3,000; Referee: Oleksandr Shmalun (Kyiv)

11 August 2006	Nyva Ternopil (2L)	0–2	(1L) Desna Chernihiv	Ternopil
17:00 LST		[ Report]	Kolodin 24' (pen.); Alayev 69'	Stadium: City Stadium; Attendance: 2,000; Referee: Oleh Shtyka (Bila Tserkva)

12 August 2006	Dniester Ovidiopol (2L)	1–3	(PL) Metalurh Donetsk	Ovidiopol, Odesa Oblast
15:00 LST	Starodubovskyi 34'	[ Report]	Sérgio 32'; Zé Leandro 41'; Polyanskyi (yellow card) 47' (yellow-red card) 53'; Vogt 66'	Stadium: Dnister Stadium; Attendance: 88; Referee: Yuriy Moseichuk (Chernivtsi)

=== Round of 32 (1/16) ===
The First Round took place on September 20, 2006. However, the match between Titan Armyansk and Vorskla Poltava took place on September 19, and Khimik Krasnoperekopsk vs. Metalurh Donetsk was played on October 4, 2006.

19 September 2006	Tytan Armyansk (2L)	2–1	(PL) Vorskla Poltava	Armyansk
16:00 LST	Batrachenko 22'; Dovzhyk 56'	Report	Grumić 45+1'	Stadium: Khimik Stadium; Attendance: 2,500; Referee: Vyacheslav Zhukov (Donetsk)

20 September 2006	Yavir Krasnopillya (2L)	1–6	(PL) Shakhtar Donetsk	Sumy
18:00 LST	Myhal 57'	Report	Vukić 9', 82'; Okoduwa 16', 45'; Jádson 21'; Brandão 50'	Stadium: Yuvileiny Stadium; Attendance: 9,800; Referee: Ihor Pokydko (Poltava)

20 September 2006	Olkom Melitopol (2L)	0–4	(PL) Dynamo Kyiv	Melitopol
16:00 LST		[ Report]	Mandzyuk 10', 45+2'; Oliynyk 72'; Vashchuk 85'	Stadium: Spartak Stadium; Attendance: 9,500; Referee: Viktor Shvetsov (Odesa)

20 September 2006	Borysfen Boryspil (1L)	4–2	(PL) Chornomorets Odesa	Boryspil
16:30 LST	Klymenko 25'; Mostovyi 42', 89'; Yatsyk 64'	[ Report]	Skoropad 52'; Zgura 68' (pen.)	Stadium: Kolos Stadium; Attendance: 1,200; Referee: Orest Shmyhelskyi (Lviv)

20 September 2006	Dynamo-Ihroservis Simferopol (1L)	2–4	(PL) Illichivets Mariupol	Simferopol
16:00 LST	Hadi 56'; Morozov 86'	[ Report]	Levyha 23', 25', 38', 53'	Stadium: Fiolent Stadium; Attendance: 1,500; Referee: Oleh Derevinskyi (Kyiv)

20 September 2006	Enerhetyk Burshtyn (1L)	0–2	(PL) Metalist Kharkiv	Burshtyn
16:00 LST		[ Report]	Davydov 58', 67'	Stadium: Enerhetyk Stadium; Attendance: 3,000; Referee: Yuriy Hrysyo (Lviv)

20 September 2006	Dnipro Cherkasy (1L)	0–1	(PL) Dnipro Dnipropetrovsk	Cherkasy
16:00 LST	Pakholyuk (penalty missed) 85' (pen.)	[ Report]	Nazarenko 62'	Stadium: Tsentralnyi Stadion; Attendance: 4,800; Referee: Ihor Podushkin (Kharkiv)

20 September 2006	Zakarpattia Uzhhorod (1L)	2–3	(PL) Tavriya Simferopol	Uzhhorod
16:00 LST	Kornutyak 15'; Bundash 89' (pen.)	[ Report]	Davydov 27'; Vishnevskiy 49'; Perić 55'	Stadium: Avanhard Stadium; Attendance: 1,300; Referee: Yuriy Moseichuk (Chernivtsi)

20 September 2006	Krymteplitsia Molodizhne (1L)	2–2 (4–2 p)	(PL) Metalurh Zaporizhhia	Molodizhne, Crimea
16:00 LST	Onysko 19', 75'; Hryshchenko (penalty missed) 34'	[ Report]	Trusevych 36'; Lazarovych 82'	Stadium: Krymteplytsia Stadium; Attendance: 2,000; Referee: Anatoliy Zhosan (Kherson)
	Penalties
	Leonov (penalty scored); Karmalita (penalty scored); Saranchukov (penalty scored); Starhorodskyi (penalty scored)		(penalty scored) Demchenko; (penalty scored) Lozynskyi; (penalty missed) Arzhanov; (penalty missed) Karamushka

20 September 2006	Obolon Kyiv (1L)	0–1	(PL) Stal Alchevsk	Kyiv
16:00 LST		[ Report]	Hakobyan 34'	Stadium: Obolon Arena; Attendance: 750; Referee: Yevhen Abrosymov (Serhiivka)

20 September 2006	Desna Chernihiv (1L)	0–2	(PL) FC Kharkiv	Chernihiv
18:00 LST	Kolodin (yellow card) 7' (red card) 79'	[ Report]	Maksymov 4'; Kitsuta 36'	Stadium: Stadion imeni Yuria Gagarina; Attendance: 7,000; Referee: Oleh Oryekhov (Kyiv)

20 September 2006	Olimpik Donetsk (2L)	1–2	(PL) Kryvbas Kryvyi Rih	Donetsk
16:00 LST	Khomutov 76'	[ Report]	Popovici 49'; Ivashchenko 60' (pen.)	Stadium: Olimpik Stadium; Attendance: 570; Referee: Eduard Mykhailyuk (Fastiv)

20 September 2006	Stal Dniprodzerzhynsk (1L)	1–0 (a.e.t.)	(PL) Zorya Luhansk	Dniprodzerzhynsk
16:00 LST	Romanenko 93'	[ Report]	Miterev (yellow card) 41' (yellow-red card) 69'	Stadium: Metalurh Stadium; Attendance: 2,500; Referee: Volodymyr Sirenko (Simferopol)

20 September 2006	FC Lviv (1L)	1–1 (a.e.t.) (3–0 p)	(PL) Karpaty Lviv	Lviv
15:00 LST	Hrytsenko 110'	Report	Batista (penalty missed) 29', 100'; Raspopov (red card) 109'	Stadium: SKA Stadium; Attendance: 8,000; Referee: Vitaliy Hodulyan (Odesa)
	Penalties
	Voitovych (penalty scored); Hrytsenko (penalty scored); Bahlay (penalty scored)		(penalty missed) Suchkow; (penalty missed) Platon; (penalty missed) Batista

20 September 2006	FC Sevastopol (2L)	3–0	(1L) Volyn Lutsk	Sevastopol
16:00 LST	Shyshkin 16' (pen.); Mazurenko 56'; Zhabokrytskyi 78'	[ Report]		Stadium: SC Sevastopol; Attendance: 3,500; Referee: Ihor Ishchenko (Kyiv)

4 October 2006	Khimik Krasnoperekopsk (2L)	2–3	(PL) Metalurh Donetsk	Krasnoperekopsk
15:00 LST	Shakhov 2'; Ivashko 8'	[ Report]	Melnyk 57'; Mendoza 77', 86'	Stadium: Khimik Stadium; Attendance: 4,500; Referee: Serhiy Zadyran (Dnipropetrovsk)

=== Round of 16 (1/8) ===
The second round matches took place on October 25, 2006.

25 October 2006	Borysfen Boryspil (1L)	0–2	(PL) Shakhtar Donetsk	Boryspil
15:00 LST		[ Report]	Tymoshchuk 59'; Vorobey 75'	Stadium: Kolos Stadium; Attendance: 22,000; Referee: Andriy Shandor (Lviv)

25 October 2006	FC Kharkiv (PL)	0–2	(PL) Dynamo Kyiv	Kharkiv
16:00 LST	Ribeiro (yellow card) 14' (red card) 24'	[ Report]	Mykhalyk 34'; Cernat 53'; Milevskyi (yellow card) 28' (red card) 60'	Stadium: Metalist Stadium; Attendance: 7,000; Referee: Yevhen Abrosymov (Serhiivka)

25 October 2006	Kryvbas Kryvyi Rih (PL)	0–2	(PL) Illichivets Mariupol	Kryvyi Rih
18:00 LST		[ Report]	Platonov 71'; Yesin 87'	Stadium: Metalurh Stadium; Attendance: 1,500; Referee: Anatoliy Zhosan (Kherson)

25 October 2006	FC Lviv (1L)	2–2 (a.e.t.) (6–7 p)	(PL) Metalist Kharkiv	Lviv
15:00 LST	Derevlyov 23'; Voytovych 63' (pen.)	[ Report]	Didenko 12'; Rykun 18'	Stadium: SKA Stadium; Attendance: 5,000; Referee: Yevhen Venher (Kyiv)
	Penalties
	Bahlay (penalty scored); Teplyi (penalty scored); Ryabovol (penalty scored); Baranets (penalty scored); Voytovych (penalty scored); Derevlyov (penalty scored); Hrytsenko (penalty missed); Shchaslyvyi (penalty missed)		(penalty scored) Papa Gueye; (penalty scored) Rykun; (penalty scored) Didenko; (penalty scored) Oliynyk; (penalty scored) Kuznyatsow; (penalty scored) Svitlychnyi; (penalty scored) Jader; (penalty missed) Davydov

25 October 2006	Tytan Armyansk (2L)	0–2	(PL) Dnipro Dnipropetrovsk	Armyansk
14:30 LST		[ Report]	Bartulović 63'; Glavina 86'	Stadium: Khimik Stadium; Attendance: 3,500; Referee: Ihor Ishchenko (Kyiv)

25 October 2006	Krymteplytsia Molodizhne (1L)	1–2	(PL) Tavriya Simferopol	Molodizhne, Simferopol Raion
15:00 LST	Onysko 90+3' (pen.)	[ Report]	Ljubenović 44'; Homenyuk 54'	Stadium: Krymteplytsia Stadium; Attendance: 3,000; Referee: Oleh Zubarev (Donetsk)

25 October 2006	PFC Sevastopol (2L)	4–1	(PL) Metalurh Donetsk	Sevastopol
15:00 LST	Shevchuk 8', 84'; Mazurenko 28', 34'	[ Report]	Mendoza 48'	Stadium: SC Sevastopol; Attendance: 6,000; Referee: Serhiy Berezka (Kyiv)

25 October 2006	Stal Dniprodzerzhynsk (1L)	1–1 (a.e.t.) (5–4 p)	(PL) Stal Alchevsk	Dniprodzerzhynsk
14:00 LST	Vizyonok 24'	[ Report]	Selin 70'	Stadium: Metalurh Stadium; Attendance: 2,400; Referee: Yevhen Herenda (Kalush)
	Penalties
	Bilyk (penalty scored); Borhun (penalty scored); Izvekov (penalty scored); Vizyonok (penalty scored); Romanenko (penalty scored)		(penalty scored) Grubelić; (penalty scored) Havryushov; (penalty scored) Tsimakuridze; (penalty scored) Voynarovskyi; (penalty missed) Polovkov

=== Quarter-finals ===
The matches took place from December 1, 2006 to December 10, 2006.

Team 1	Agg.	Team 2	1st leg	2nd leg
FC Sevastopol	1–7	FC Shakhtar Donetsk	0–1	1–6
FC Dynamo Kyiv	3–2	FC Dnipro Dnipropetrovsk	1–1	2–1 (a.e.t.)
FC Illichivets Mariupol	0–2	FC Metalist Kharkiv	0–0	0–2
FC Stal Dniprodzerzhynsk	1–5	SC Tavriya Simferopol	1–4	0–1

==== First leg ====
1 December 2006	PFC Sevastopol (2L)	0–1	(PL) Shakhtar Donetsk	Sevastopol
13:00 LST		Report	Okoduwa 28'	Stadium: SC Sevastopol; Attendance: 5,000; Referee: Ihor Pokydko (Poltava)

1 December 2006	Dynamo Kyiv (PL)	1–1	(PL) Dnipro Dnipropetrovsk	Kyiv
18:00 LST	Shatskikh 61'	Report	Kornilenko 67'	Stadium: Lobanovsky Dynamo Stadium; Attendance: 12,500; Referee: Vladimír Hriňák (Slovakia)

2 December 2006	Illichivets Mariupol (PL)	0–0	(PL) Metalist Kharkiv	Mariupol
16:00 LST		Report		Stadium: Illichivets Stadium; Attendance: 6,000; Referee: Andriy Shandor (Lviv)

2 December 2006	Stal Dniprodzerzhynsk (1L)	1–4	(PL) Tavriya Simferopol	Dniprodzerzhynsk
13:00 LST	Iliashov 67'	Report	Homenyuk 47'; Snytko 58'; Ljubenović 62'; Solyanyk 78'	Stadium: Metalurh Stadium; Attendance: 3,000; Referee: Ihor Ishchenko (Kyiv)

==== Second leg ====
9 December 2006	Shakhtar Donetsk (PL)	6–1	(2L) PFC Sevastopol	Donetsk
14:00 LST	Byelik 7', 59', 79'; Okoduwa 31'; Kucher 41'; Vorobey (penalty missed) 61'	Report	Shevchuk 28'; Kaika 35' (o.g.)	Stadium: RSC Olimpiyskiy; Attendance: 9,000; Referee: Serhiy Berezka (Kyiv)
Note: Shakhtar Donetsk won 7–1 on aggregate.

9 December 2006	Metalist Kharkiv (PL)	2–0	(PL) Illichivets Mariupol	Kharkiv
16:00 LST	Fomin 45+2'; Rykun 55' (pen.)	Report		Stadium: Metalist Stadium; Attendance: 10,000; Referee: Viktor Shvetsov (Odesa)
Note: Metalist Kharkiv won 2–0 on aggregate.

9 December 2006	Tavriya Simferopol (PL)	1–0	(1L) Stal Dniprodzerzhynsk	Simferopol
13:00 LST	Pershyn 31'	Report		Stadium: RSC Lokomotiv; Attendance: 2,554; Referee: Serhiy Shebek (Kyiv)
Note: Tavriya Simferopol won 5–1 on aggregate.

10 December 2006	Dnipro Dnipropetrovsk (PL)	1–2 (a.e.t.)	(PL) Dynamo Kyiv	Dnipropetrovsk
16:00 LST	Melashchenko 75'; Yezerskiy (red card) 77'	Report	Shatskikh 64'; Yussuf 94'	Stadium: Meteor Stadium; Attendance: 12,500; Referee: Peter Vervecken (Belgium)
Note: Dynamo Kyiv won 3–2 on aggregate.

=== Semi-finals ===
The semifinals took place on April 18, 2007 and May 9, 2007.

Team 1	Agg.	Team 2	1st leg	2nd leg
FC Metalist Kharkiv	2–5	FC Dynamo Kyiv	0–1	2–4
FC Shakhtar Donetsk	(a) 2–2	SC Tavriya Simferopol	0–0	2–2

==== First leg ====
18 April 2007	Metalist Kharkiv (PL)	0–1	(PL) Dynamo Kyiv	Kharkiv
19:00 LST		Report	Milevskyi 77'	Stadium: Metalist Stadium; Attendance: 20,500; Referee: Vitaliy Hodulian

18 April 2007	Shakhtar Donetsk (PL)	0–0	(PL) Tavriya Simferopol	Donetsk
19:00 LST		Report		Stadium: RSC Olimpiyskiy; Attendance: 21,000; Referee: Andriy Shandor

==== Second leg ====
9 May 2007	Dynamo Kyiv (PL)	4–2	(PL) Metalist Kharkiv	Kyiv
18:00 LST	Kléber 17'; Rodrigo 23'; Rincón 83'; Husyev 86'	Report	Fomin 15'; Rykun 49' (pen.)	Stadium: Lobanovsky Dynamo Stadium; Attendance: 10,700; Referee: Anatoliy Zhosan
Note: Dynamo Kyiv won 5–2 on aggregate.

9 May 2007	Tavriya Simferopol (PL)	2–2	(PL) Shakhtar Donetsk	Simferopol
18:00 LST	Homenyuk 3'; Zelmikas 6'	Report	Chyhrynskyi 23'; Matuzalém 26'	Stadium: Lokomotiv RSC; Attendance: 17,000; Referee: Serhiy Zadiran
Note: 2–2 on aggregate; Shakhtar Donetsk won on away goals.

=== Final ===
27 May 2007
19:00 LST

Dynamo Kyiv	2–1	Shakhtar Donetsk
Kléber 58'; Rodrigo (yellow card) 27' (yellow-red card) 71'; Husyev 80'	Report	Elano 89'

Olympic Stadium, Kyiv
Attendance: 64,500
Referee: Andriy Shandor (Lviv)

== Top goalscorers ==
Rank	Scorer	Team	Goals (Pen.)

== See also ==
- 2006–07 Ukrainian Premier League
- 2006–07 Ukrainian First League
- 2006–07 Ukrainian Second League
