= 2006–07 in Ukrainian football =

Football in Ukraine
- Season: 2006–07

Men's football
- Premier League: Dynamo Kyiv
- League 1: Naftovyk-Ukrnafta Okhtyrka
- League 2: Dnister Ovidiopol (Group A); PFC Sevastopol (Group B)
- Amateur League: Bastion Illichivsk (2007); Shakhtar Sverdlovsk (2006)
- Cup: Dynamo Kyiv
- Amateur Cup: Yednist-2 Plysky (2007); Karpaty Kamianka-Buzka (2006)
- Super Cup: Dynamo Kyiv

Women's football
- League High: Naftokhimik Kalush (2007); Zhytlobud-1 Kharkiv (2006)
- Women's Cup: Zhytlobud-1 Kharkiv (2007); Zhytlobud-1 Kharkiv (2006)

The 2006–07 season was the 16th season of competitive association football in Ukraine since dissolution of the Soviet Union.

== Men's club football ==
League	Promoted to league	Relegated from league
Premier League	Zorya Luhansk; Karpaty Lviv	Volyn Lutsk; Zakarpattya Uzhhorod
League One	Desna Chernihiv; MFC Mykolaiv; PFC Oleksandriya; Dnipro Cherkasy	~~Shakhtar-2 Donetsk~~; ~~FC Bershad~~
League Two	Lokomotyv Dvorichna; Feniks-Illichivets Kalinine	~~Rava Rava-Ruska~~; ~~Sokil Berezhany~~; ~~Chornohora Ivano-Frankivsk~~; ~~Zhytychi Zhytomyr~~; ~~MFC Zhytomyr~~; ~~Yalos Yalta~~; ~~Kryvbas-2 Kryvyi Rih~~; ~~Zirka Kirovohrad~~; ~~Krystal Kherson~~; ~~MFC Oleksandriya~~; ~~FC Kharkiv-2~~

Note: For all scratched clubs, see section Clubs removed for more details

=== Premier League ===
Pos	Team	Pld	W	D	L	GF	GA	GD	Pts	Qualification or relegation
1	Dynamo Kyiv (C)	30	22	8	0	67	23	+44	74	Qualification to Champions League third qualifying round
2	Shakhtar Donetsk	30	19	6	5	57	20	+37	63	Qualification to Champions League second qualifying round
3	Metalist Kharkiv	30	18	7	5	40	20	+20	61	Qualification to UEFA Cup first round
4	Dnipro Dnipropetrovsk	30	11	14	5	32	24	+8	47	Qualification to UEFA Cup second qualifying round
5	Tavriya Simferopol	30	12	6	12	32	30	+2	42	
6	Chornomorets Odesa	30	11	8	11	36	33	+3	41	Qualification to Intertoto Cup second round
7	Metalurh Zaporizhzhya	30	10	10	10	25	32	−7	40	
8	Karpaty Lviv	30	9	10	11	26	32	−6	37	
9	Metalurh Donetsk	30	9	9	12	26	35	−9	36	
10	Kryvbas Kryvyi Rih	30	7	14	9	29	36	−7	35	
11	Zorya Luhansk	30	9	7	14	23	43	−20	34	
12	FC Kharkiv	30	8	9	13	26	38	−12	33	
13	Vorskla Poltava	30	7	10	13	23	28	−5	31	
14	Arsenal Kyiv	30	7	9	14	28	44	−16	30	
15	Illichivets Mariupol (R)	30	6	7	17	23	39	−16	25	Relegated to Ukrainian First League
16	Stal Alchevsk (R)	30	5	6	19	22	38	−16	21	Relegated to Ukrainian First League

Source: uafootball.net.ua
(C) Champions; (R) Relegated

=== League 1 ===
Pos	Team	Pld	W	D	L	GF	GA	GD	Pts	Promotion or relegation
1	Naftovyk-Ukrnafta Okhtyrka (C, P)	36	27	2	7	58	29	+29	83	Promoted to Vyshcha Liha
2	Zakarpattia Uzhhorod (P)	36	25	5	6	50	22	+28	80	Promoted to Vyshcha Liha
3	Obolon Kyiv	36	23	4	9	47	27	+20	73	
4	Krymteplitsia Molodizhne	36	21	7	8	53	37	+16	70	
5	Olexandria	35	18	4	13	37	27	+10	58	
6	Dynamo-2 Kyiv	36	17	8	11	53	37	+16	59	No promotion
7	Helios Kharkiv	36	17	7	12	45	36	+9	58	
8	Enerhetyk Burshtyn	36	15	11	10	44	33	+11	56	
9	Stal Dniprodzerzhynsk	36	15	8	13	42	37	+5	53	
10	Ihroservice Simferopol	36	14	9	13	46	44	+2	51	
11	FC Lviv	36	13	8	15	45	45	0	47	
12	Volyn Lutsk	36	13	7	16	40	48	−8	46	
13	MFK Mykolaiv	36	12	10	14	33	40	−7	46	
14	Desna Chernihiv	36	11	8	17	51	58	−7	41	
15	Dnipro Cherkasy	36	10	9	17	31	46	−15	39	
16	CSKA Kyiv	36	10	8	18	24	44	−20	38	
17	Spartak Ivano-Frankivsk (D)	36	10	3	23	24	51	−27	33	Withdrew
18	Podillya Khmelnytskyi (Note: Podillia Khmelnytskyi had taken 3 points off in accordance with decision of the FFU Disciplinary Committee of May 25, 2007; 3 points off in accordance with decision of the PFL Bureau of Ukraine of June 5, 2007; and 6 points off in accordance with decision of the FFU Appellation Committee of June 22, 2007.) (D)	36	5	6	25	20	63	−43	9	Withdrew
19	Borysfen Boryspil (Note: Borysfen Boryspil had taken 6 points off in accordance with decision of the PFL Bureau of Ukraine of February 6, 2007.) (D)	36	1	4	31	10	29	−19	1	Excluded
–	Spartak Sumy (D)	0	1	0	18	4	49	—	0	Withdrew

Source: Professional Football League of Ukraine
Rules for classification: 1st points; 2nd goal difference; 3rd goals scored; 4th head-to-head points; 5th head-to-head goal difference; 6th head-to-head goals scored; 7th fair play; 8th draw
(C) Champions; (D) Disqualified; (P) Promoted

=== League 2 ===
Pos	Team	Pld	W	D	L	GF	GA	GD	Pts	Promotion or relegation
1	FC Dnister Ovidiopol (C, P)	28	18	8	2	44	12	+32	62	Promoted to First League
2	FC Fakel Ivano-Frankivsk (P)	28	18	5	5	39	18	+21	59	Promoted to First League
3	FC Yednist Plysky	28	16	6	6	50	24	+26	54	
4	FC Nyva Ternopil	28	15	8	5	33	15	+18	53	
5	FC Kniazha Schaslyve	28	14	9	5	34	24	+10	51	
6	FC Nafkom Brovary	28	13	7	8	40	30	+10	46	
7	FC Ros Bila Tserkva	28	13	4	11	36	32	+4	43	
8	FC Karpaty-2 Lviv	28	10	9	9	41	35	+6	39	
9	FC Enerhiya Pivdenoukrainsk	28	10	7	11	33	30	+3	37	
10	FC Bukovyna Chernivtsi	28	5	12	11	22	40	−18	27	
11	FC Dynamo-3 Kyiv	28	5	10	13	29	32	−3	25	
12	FC Obolon-2 Kyiv	28	5	9	14	26	45	−19	24	
13	FC Veres Rivne	28	5	7	16	24	44	−20	22	
14	FC Naftovyk Dolyna	28	3	7	18	14	40	−26	16	
15	FC Inter Boyarka	28	3	6	19	17	61	−44	15	Withdrew (Note: FC Inter Boyarka completed the season but failed to submit a license for the following season.)

(C) Champions; (P) Promoted
Notes:

Pos	Team	Pld	W	D	L	GF	GA	GD	Pts	Promotion or relegation
1	PFC Sevastopol (C, P)	28	21	1	6	58	21	+37	64	Promoted to First League
2	FC Feniks-Illichivets Kalinine (P)	28	17	6	5	42	22	+20	57	Promoted to First League
3	FC Titan Armyansk	28	16	8	4	48	21	+27	56	
4	FC Illichivets-2 Mariupol	28	17	3	8	36	35	+1	54	
5	FC Khimik Krasnoperekopsk	28	13	7	8	35	28	+7	46	
6	FC Hirnik Kryvyi Rih	28	13	5	10	46	41	+5	44	
7	FC Olkom Melitopol	28	10	8	10	35	29	+6	38	
8	FC Shakhtar-3 Donetsk	28	10	6	12	42	50	−8	36	
9	FC Arsenal Kharkiv	28	10	4	14	35	42	−7	34	
10	FC Olimpik Donetsk	28	8	8	12	35	41	−6	32	
11	FC Hazovyk-KhGV Kharkiv	28	8	7	13	20	36	−16	31	
12	FC Metalurh-2 Zaporizhzhia	28	9	3	16	26	40	−14	30	
13	FC Yavir Krasnopilya	28	6	7	15	18	30	−12	25	
14	FC Kremin Kremenchuk	28	6	7	15	20	35	−15	25	
15	FC Hirnyk-Sport Komsomolsk	28	5	2	21	23	48	−25	17	
-	FC Lokomotyv Dvorichna	0	-	-	-	-	-	—	0	Results expunged (Note: FC Lokomotyv Dvorichna obtained a professional license and entered the PFL, played 4 games before going bankrupt and were expelled. Their record was one win and 3 losses with 3 goals scored and 6 goals against. Their results were officially removed from the competition. (August 29th, 2006))

(C) Champions; (P) Promoted

=== Cup competitions ===
==== Ukrainian Cup ====
2007-05-27
19:00 LST

Dynamo Kyiv	2 – 1	Shakhtar Donetsk
Kléber 58'; Husyev 80'	Report	Elano 89'

NSC Olimpiyskiy, Kyiv
Attendance: 64,500
Referee: Andriy Shandor (Lviv)

==== Super Cup ====
16 July 2006
20:30 EEST

Dynamo Kyiv	2–0	Shakhtar Donetsk
Marković 10'; Milevskyi 88'	Report

Central Stadium "Chornomorets", Odesa
Attendance: 34,000
Referee: Vitalii Hodulian (Odesa)

== Women's club football ==
League	Promoted to league	Relegated from league
Higher League	Voskhod Stara Maiachka	~~Lehenda-ShVSM Chernihiv~~; Ateks SDIuShOR-16 Kyiv

Note: For all scratched clubs, see section Clubs removed for more details

=== Higher League ===
2007 Vyshcha Liha (women)
