= 2005–06 Ukrainian Cup =

2005—06 Ukrainian Cup
Kubok Ukrainy
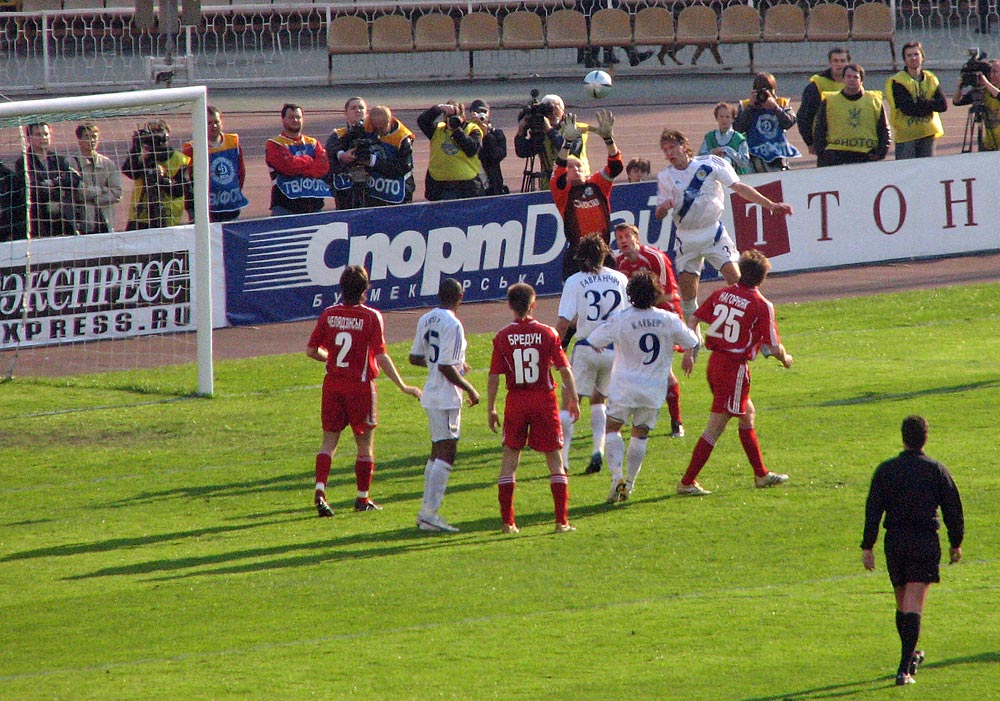
- FC Dynamo Kyiv and FC Metalurh Zaporizhya in the Ukrainian Cup final in Kyiv on 2 May 2006.

Tournament details
- Country: Ukraine
- Dates: 1 August 2005 – 2 May 2006; 1 August 2005 (qualification round); 13 August 2005 – 2 May 2006 (main event)
- Teams: 69

Final positions
- Champions: Dynamo Kyiv (8th title)
- Runners-up: Metalurh Zaporizhzhia

The 2005–06 Ukrainian Cup was the 15th annual edition of Ukraine's football knockout competition, known as the Ukrainian Cup. The winner of this competition was Dynamo Kyiv.

== Team allocation ==
Seventy teams entered the competition

=== Distribution ===
	Teams entering in this round	Teams advancing from previous round
Qualifying round (12 teams)	12 participants of the Second League (lower seeded)	
Tournament proper (64 teams)	16 participants of the Premier League; 16 participants of the First League; 28 participants of the Second League (higher seeded)	6 winners from the second qualifying round

=== Round and draw dates ===
All draws held at FFU headquarters (Building of Football) in Kyiv unless stated otherwise.

Phase	Round	Draw date	Game date	
Phase	Round	Draw date	First leg	Second leg
Qualifying round		?	1 August 2005	
Main event	Round of 64	?	13–14 August 2005	
Main event	Round of 32	?	21 September 2005	
Main event	Round of 16	?	26 October 2005	
Main event	Quarter-finals	?	End of 2005	
Main event	Semi-finals	?	22 March 2006	12 April 2006
Main event	Final	2 May 2006 at NSC "Olimpiyskiy", Kyiv		

== Competition Schedule ==
=== Preliminary round ===
The Preliminary Round took place on August 8, 2005.

FC Sokil Berezhany (2L)	0:0	(2L) FC Naftovyk Dolyna	(pk: 6:7)
FC Zhytychi Zhytomyr (2L)	1:0	(2L) MFC Zhytomyr
FC Knyazha Schaslyve (2L)	1:3	(2L) FC Yednist Plysky	(a.e.t.)
FC Yalos Yalta (2L)	3:0	(2L) PFC Sevastopol
FC Arsenal Kharkiv (2L)	0:2	(2L) FC Yavir Krasnopillia
FC Hirnyk-Sport Komsomolsk (2L)	2:1	(2L) FC Kremin Kremenchuk

=== Round of 64 ===
The First Round took place on August 13, 2005. However, the match between PFC Olexandria and Dnipro Dnipropetrovsk took place on August 14.

FC Rava Rava-Ruska (2L)	1:0	(1L) FC Helios Kharkiv
FC Desna Chernihiv (2L)	2:5	(PL) FC Shakhtar Donetsk
FC Fakel Ivano-Frankivsk (2L)	0:1	(1L) FC Spartak Sumy
FC Nyva Ternopil (2L)	1:3	(PL) FC Chornomorets Odesa
FC Osvita Kyiv (2L)	0:3	(PL) FC Kharkiv
FC Veres Rivne (2L)	2:1	(1L) FC Enerhetyk Burshtyn
FC Chornohora Ivano-Frankivsk (2L)	1:4	(PL) FC Volyn Lutsk
FC Naftovyk Dolyna (2L)	1:0	(1L) FC Borysfen Boryspil
FC Zhytychi Zhytomyr (2L)	0:1	(1L) FC Stal Dniprodzerzhynsk
MFC Mykolaiv (2L)	1:2	(PL) FC Metalurh Zaporizhia
FC Krystal Kherson (2L)	0:5	(PL) FC Dynamo Kyiv
FC Hirnyk Kryvyi Rih (2L)	2:3	(1L) FC Karpaty Lviv
FC Tytan Armyansk (2L)	1:2	(PL) FC Illichivets Mariupol
FC Ros Bila Tserkva (2L)	0:2	(PL) FC Kryvbas Kryvyi Rih
FC Olkom Melitopol (2L)	0:1	(PL) FC Zakarpattia Uzhhorod
FC Dnister Ovidiopol (2L)	2:3	(PL) FC Metalist Kharkiv
FC Zirka Kirovohrad (2L)	0:2	(1L) FC Spartak Ivano-Frankivsk
FC Enerhiya Yuzhnoukrainsk (2L)	1:5	(PL) FC Stal Alchevsk
FC Yednist Plysky (2L)	0:3	(PL) FC Vorskla Poltava
FC Khimik Krasnoperekopsk (2L)	3:2	(1L) FC Bershad
FC Yalos Yalta (2L)	1:0	(1L) FC Podillia Khmelnytskyi
FC Nafkom Brovary (2L)	3:3	(1L) FC Naftovyk Okhtyrka	(pk: 2:4)
FC Dnipro Cherkasy (2L)	0:0	(1L) FC Obolon Kyiv	(pk: 4:2)
FC Hazovyk Kharkiv (2L)	0:4	(PL) SC Tavriya Simferopol
MFC Oleksandria (2L)	0:6	(PL) FC Arsenal Kyiv
FC Hirnyk-Sport Komsomolsk (2L)	2:1	(1L) FC Dynamo-IhroService Simferopol
FC Yavir Krasnopillia (2L)	0:3	(1L) FC Hazovyk-Skala Stryi
FC Olimpik Donetsk (2L)	2:3	(1L) FC Krymteplytsia Molodizhne
PFC Olexandria (2L)	1:2	(PL) FC Dnipro Dnipropetrovsk

=== Round of 32 (1/16) ===
The Second Round took place on September 21, 2005.

FC Karpaty Lviv (1L)	1:0	(PL) FC Chornomorets Odesa
FC CSKA Kyiv (1L)	0:1	(PL) FC Metalurh Donetsk
FC Spartak Ivano-Frankivsk (1L)	0:7	(PL) FC Dynamo Kyiv
FC Naftovyk Okhtyrka (1L)	2:3	(PL) FC Stal Alchevsk
FC Spartak Sumy (1L)	1:4	(PL) FC Metalurh Zaporizhia
FC Krymteplitsia Molodizhne (1L)	1:3	(PL) FC Shakhtar Donetsk
FC Rava Rava-Ruska (2L)	0:2	(PL) FC Dnipro Dnipropetrovsk
FC Dnipro Cherkasy (2L)	1:2	(PL) FC Metalist Kharkiv
FC Veres Rivne (2L)	2:2	(PL) FC Zakarpattia Uzhhorod	(pk: 5:3)
FC Hirnyk-Sport Komsomolsk (2L)	0:2	(PL) FC Vorskla Poltava
FC Khimik Krasnoperekopsk (2L)	2:3	(PL) FC Kryvbas Kryvyi Rih

21 September 2005	Naftovyk Dolyna (2L)	0–4	(PL) Tavriya Simferopol	Dolyna
?:? LST		[ Report]	19' Karmalita; 70' Homenyuk; 80' Postolatyev; 82' Sybyryakov	Stadium: Naftovyk; Attendance: 4,000; Referee: Moseichuk

21 September 2005	Hazovyk-Skala Stryi (1L)	2–0	(PL) FC Kharkiv	Stryi
?:? LST	Ilchyshyn 59'; Pitsur 80'	[ Report]		Stadium: Sokil Stadium; Attendance: 4,000; Referee: Tsyhankov

21 September 2005	Yalos Yalta (2L)	0–1 (a.e.t.)	(PL) Illichivets Mariupol	Yalta
?:? LST		[ Report]	118' Hai	Stadium: Avanhard; Attendance: 3,000; Referee: Holovko

21 September 2005	Stal Dniprodzerzhynsk (1L)	3–1	(PL) Volyn Lutsk	Dniprodzerzhynsk
?:? LST	Sytnik 51'; Vizyonok 58'; Mazyar 86'	[ Report]	42' Božić	Stadium: Metalurh Stadium; Attendance: 3,000; Referee: Shebek

21 September 2005	Bukovyna Chernivtsi (1L)	0–1	(PL) Arsenal Kyiv	Chernivtsi
?:? LST		[ Report]	90+2' Pershyn	Stadium: Bukovyna Stadium; Attendance: 8,500; Referee: Vl. Levko

=== Round of 16 (1/8) ===
The third round matches took place on October 26, 2005.

26 October 2005	Karpaty Lviv (1L)	1–0	(PL) Shakhtar Donetsk	Lviv
?:? LST	Batista 75'	[ Report]		Stadium: Ukraina Stadium; Attendance: 28,000; Referee: Yarmenchuk

26 October 2005	Dynamo Kyiv (PL)	1–0	(PL) Metalist Kharkiv	Kyiv
?:? LST	Milevskyi 68'	[ Report]		Stadium: Olimpiyskiy National Sports Complex; Attendance: 6,500; Referee: Melnychuk

26 October 2005	Vorskla Poltava (PL)	1–0	(PL) Dnipro Dnipropetrovsk	Poltava
?:? LST	Epureanu 90' (pen.)	[ Report]		Stadium: Vorskla Stadium; Attendance: 3,600; Referee: Berezka

26 October 2005	Stal Alchevsk (PL)	1–2	(PL) Metalurh Donetsk	Alchevsk
?:? LST	Pârvu 6', 86' (o.g.)	[ Report]	4' Kosyrin	Stadium: Stal Stadium; Attendance: 4,000; Referee: Moseichuk

26 October 2005	Veres Rivne (2L)	2–4	(PL) Metalurh Zaporizhia	Rivne
?:? LST	Deva 62', 71'	[ Report]	36' Aristarkhov; 42' Shkëmbi; 55' Nevmyvaka; 59' Anđelković	Stadium: Avanhard Stadium; Attendance: 8,000; Referee: Venher

26 October 2005	Hazovyk-Skala Stryi (1L)	0–1	(PL) Illichivets Mariupol	Stryi
?:? LST		[ Report]	39' Tsykhmeistruk	Stadium: Sokil Stadium; Attendance: 5,500; Referee: Denysyuk

26 October 2005	Kryvbas Kryvyi Rih (PL)	2–0	(PL) Tavriya Simferopol	Kryvyi Rih
?:? LST	12' Gigiadze; 60' Korabļovs	[ Report]		Stadium: Metalurh Stadium; Attendance: 8,000; Referee: Herenda

26 October 2005	Stal Dniprodzerzhynsk (1L)	0–2	(PL) Arsenal Kyiv	Dniprodzerzhynsk
?:? LST		[ Report]	38' Okoduwa; 55' Mizin	Stadium: Metalurh Stadium; Attendance: 2,900; Referee: Pokydko

=== Quarterfinals ===
In the quarterfinals, there were four pairs of teams, and each pair plays a single match. The match schedule stretched from November 13, 2005 to December 14, 2005.

13 November 2005	Dynamo Kyiv (PL)	2–0	(PL) Metalurh Donetsk	Kyiv
17:00 LST	Rotan 18'; Husyev 34'	[ Report]		Stadium: NSC Olimpiyskiy; Attendance: 5,000; Referee: Ihor Pokydko (Poltava)

23 November 2005	Karpaty Lviv (1L)	1–0	(PL) Vorskla Poltava	Lviv
19:00 LST	Batista 25'	[ Report]		Stadium: Ukraina Stadium; Attendance: 28,000; Referee: Ihor Ishchenko (Kyiv)

13 December 2005	Illichivets Mariupol (PL)	2–0	(PL) Arsenal Kyiv	Mariupol
16:00 LST	Hai 7', 47'	[ Report]		Stadium: Illichivets Stadium; Attendance: 10,000; Referee: Vitaliy Hodulyan (Odesa)

14 December 2005	Metalurh Zaporizhia (PL)	2–0	(PL) Kryvbas Kryvyi Rih	Zaporizhia
15:00 LST	Kutarba 11'; Polyovyi 50'; Nahornyak 84'	[ Report]		Stadium: Auto ZAZ Stadium; Attendance: 4,000; Referee: Ihor Podushkin (Kharkiv)

=== Semifinals ===
The semifinals took place on March 22, 2006 and April 12, 2006.

Team 1	Agg.	Team 2	1st leg	2nd leg
FC Metalurh Zaporizhia (PL)	3–2	(PL) FC Illichivets Mariupol	2–1	1–1
FC Karpaty Lviv (1L)	0–3	(PL) FC Dynamo Kyiv	0–2	0–1

==== First leg ====
22 March 2006	Metalurh Zaporizhia (PL)	2–1	(PL) Illichivets Mariupol	Zaporizhia
18:00 LST	Aliev 61'; Lyubarskyi 73'	[ Report]	Konyushenko 53'	Stadium: AutoZAZ Stadium; Attendance: 5,900; Referee: Yevhen Abrosymov (Odesa)

22 March 2006	Karpaty Lviv (1L)	0–2	(PL) Dynamo Kyiv	Lviv
19:00 LST		[ Report]	Husyev 32'; Milevskyi 57'	Stadium: Ukraina Stadium; Attendance: 28,000; Referee: Yuriy Moseichuk (Chernivtsi)

==== Second leg ====
12 April 2006	Illichivets Mariupol (PL)	1–1	(PL) Metalurh Zaporizhia	Mariupol
17:00 LST	Hai 68'	[ Report]	Modebadze 31'	Stadium: Illichivets Stadium; Attendance: 12,500; Referee: Serhiy Berezka (Kyiv)

12 April 2006	Dynamo Kyiv (PL)	1–0	(1L) Karpaty Lviv	Kyiv
18:00 LST	Kléber 6'	[ Report]		Stadium: NSC Olimpiyskyi; Attendance: 8,000; Referee: Vitaliy Hodulyan (Odesa)

=== Final ===
2 May 2006
17:00 LST

Dynamo Kyiv (PL)	1–0	(PL) Metalurh Zaporizhia
Kléber 46'	Report

NSC Olimpiyskiy, Kyiv
Attendance: 25,000
Referee: Lucílio Batista
