= 2006–07 Ukrainian First League =

Ukrainian First League
- Season: 2006–07
- Champions: Naftovyk-Ukrnafta Okhtyrka
- Promoted: Naftovyk-Ukrnafta Okhtyrka; Zakarpattia Uzhhorod
- Relegated: (all withdrew); Spartak Ivano-Frankivsk; Podillya Khmelnytskyi; Borysfen Boryspil; Spartak Sumy
- Top goalscorer: 16 - Matviy Bobal (Ihroservice Simferopol)

The 2006–07 Ukrainian First League was the sixteenth since its establishment. There were 20 teams competing. Two teams were relegated from the Ukrainian Premier League 2005-06. Four teams were promoted from the 2005–06 Ukrainian Second League.

== Promotion and relegation ==
=== Promoted teams ===
These four teams were promoted from Druha Liha at the start of the season:

==== Group A ====
- FC Desna Chernihiv : Druha Liha champion (Returning after seven seasons)

==== Group B ====
- MFK Mykolaiv : Druha Liha champion (Returning after a seasons)
- PFC Olexandria : Druha Liha runner-up (Returning after five seasons)

==== Group C ====
- FC Dnipro Cherkasy : Druha Liha champion (Returning after five seasons)

=== Relegated teams ===
Two teams were relegated from the Ukrainian Premier League 2005–06 season after finishing on the bottom of the competition:

- FC Volyn Lutsk : 15th place (Returning after four seasons)
- FC Zakarpattia Uzhhorod : 16th place (Returning after two seasons)

=== Renamed/relocated teams ===
- On May 23, 2006, the PFL Bureau of Ukraine acknowledged that FC Lviv will replace FC Hazovyk-Skala Stryi as its successor. The club was moved from Stryi to Lviv.
- On December 19, 2006 FC Dynamo-Ihroservis Simferopol changed to FC Ihroservis Simferopol.

== Teams ==
In 2006–07 season, the Ukrainian First League consists of the following teams:

Locations of teams in First League

== Managers ==
Club	Coach	Replaced coach
Desna Chernihiv	(Ukraine) Serhiy Kucherenko	(Ukraine) Oleksandr Tomakh (Ukraine) Serhiy Bakun (caretaker)
Dynamo-2 Kyiv	(Ukraine) Henadiy Lytovchenko	
Enerhetyk Burshtyn	(Ukraine) Mykola Prystay	
Helios Kharkiv	(Ukraine) Oleksandr Sevidov	
Ihroservice Simferopol	(Ukraine) Rostyslav Lysenko	(Ukraine) Oleh Lutkov
Krymteplitsia Molodizhne	(Ukraine) Oleksandr Haydash	
Obolon Kyiv	(Ukraine) Petro Slobodyan	
PFC Oleksandria	(Ukraine) Ihor Bohatyr	
Spartak Ivano-Frankivsk	(Ukraine) Mykola Vasylkiv (caretaker)	(Ukraine) Yuriy Shulyatytskyi (caretaker) (Ukraine) Serhiy Kucherenko
Volyn Lutsk	(Ukraine) Vitaliy Kvartsyanyi	
FC Lviv	(Ukraine) Stepan Yurchyshyn	(Ukraine) Bohdan Bandura
MFC Mykolaiv	(Ukraine) Leonid Haidarzhy	
CSKA Kyiv	(Ukraine) Serhiy Revut	(Ukraine) Yuriy Maksymov
Dnipro Cherkasy	(Ukraine) Serhiy Morozov	
Stal Dniprodzerzhynsk	(Ukraine) Serhiy Diryavka	(Ukraine) Viktor Maslov (Ukraine) Yuriy Pohrebnyak
Naftovyk-Ukrnafta Okhtyrka	(Ukraine) Viktor Ishchenko (caretaker)	(Ukraine) Serhiy Shevchenko
Zakarpattia Uzhhorod	(Ukraine) Petro Kushlyk	
Spartak Sumy	(Ukraine) Serhiy Strashnenko	
Podillya Khmelnytskyi	(Ukraine) Zyhmund Vysotskyi	(Ukraine) Serhiy Kucherenko
Borysfen Boryspil	(Ukraine) Oleksandr Ryabokon	(Ukraine) Oleksandr Prykhodko (caretaker)

== Final standings ==
Pos	Team	Pld	W	D	L	GF	GA	GD	Pts	Promotion or relegation
1	Naftovyk-Ukrnafta Okhtyrka (C, P)	36	27	2	7	58	29	+29	83	Promoted to Vyshcha Liha
2	Zakarpattia Uzhhorod (P)	36	25	5	6	50	22	+28	80	Promoted to Vyshcha Liha
3	Obolon Kyiv	36	23	4	9	47	27	+20	73	
4	Krymteplitsia Molodizhne	36	21	7	8	53	37	+16	70	
5	Olexandria	36	19	4	13	37	27	+10	61	
6	Dynamo-2 Kyiv	36	17	8	11	53	37	+16	59	No promotion
7	Helios Kharkiv	36	17	7	12	45	36	+9	58	
8	Enerhetyk Burshtyn	36	15	11	10	44	33	+11	56	
9	Stal Dniprodzerzhynsk	36	15	8	13	42	37	+5	53	
10	Ihroservice Simferopol	36	14	9	13	46	44	+2	51	
11	FC Lviv	36	13	8	15	45	45	0	47	
12	Volyn Lutsk	36	13	7	16	40	48	−8	46	
13	MFK Mykolaiv	36	12	10	14	33	40	−7	46	
14	Desna Chernihiv	36	11	8	17	51	58	−7	41	
15	Dnipro Cherkasy	36	10	9	17	31	46	−15	39	
16	CSKA Kyiv	36	10	8	18	24	44	−20	38	
17	Spartak Ivano-Frankivsk (D)	36	10	3	23	24	51	−27	33	Withdrew
18	Podillya Khmelnytskyi (Note: Podillia Khmelnytskyi had taken 3 points off in accordance with decision of the FFU Disciplinary Committee of May 25, 2007; 3 points off in accordance with decision of the PFL Bureau of Ukraine of June 5, 2007; and 6 points off in accordance with decision of the FFU Appellation Committee of June 22, 2007.) (D)	36	5	6	25	20	63	−43	9	Withdrew
19	Borysfen Boryspil (Note: Borysfen Boryspil had taken 6 points off in accordance with decision of the PFL Bureau of Ukraine of February 6, 2007.) (D)	36	1	4	31	10	29	−19	1	Excluded
–	Spartak Sumy (D)	0	1	0	18	4	49	—	0	Withdrew

Source: Professional Football League of Ukraine
Rules for classification: 1st points; 2nd goal difference; 3rd goals scored; 4th head-to-head points; 5th head-to-head goal difference; 6th head-to-head goals scored; 7th fair play; 8th draw
(C) Champions; (D) Disqualified; (P) Promoted

== Top scorers ==
Statistics are taken from here.

Scorer	Goals (pen.)	Team
(Ukraine) Matviy Bobal	16	Ihroservice Simferopol
(Ukraine) Bohdan Yesyp	15 (1)	Naftovyk-Ukrnafta Okhtyrka
(Ukraine) Oleksandr Sytnik	14 (1)	Stal Dniprodzerzhynsk
(Ukraine) Valentyn Krukovets	13 (1)	Desna Chernihiv
(Nigeria) Alozi Chidi	13 (3)	Volyn Lutsk
(Ukraine) Myroslav Bundash	13 (9)	Zakarpattia Uzhhorod
(Ukraine) Pavlo Onysko	12 (3)	Krymteplytsia Molodizhne; Obolon Kyiv
(Ukraine) Ruslan Zeinalov	12 (8)	Naftovyk-Ukrnafta Okhtyrka
(Ukraine) Oleksandr Hrebinyuk	11	PFC Olexandria
(Ukraine) Roman Polishchuk	11 (5)	Dnipro Cherkasy
(Ukraine) Andriy Yarmolenko	7	Desna Chernihiv / Dynamo-2 Kyiv

== Teams withdrawn during and after season ==
=== Spartak Sumy ===
On November 28, 2006 PFL Bureau has excluded FC Spartak Sumy from competitions for the second no show. Due to the fact that team has physically played less than 50% of calendar games (17 games), all its season record was stripped. Upon withdrawal it had 1-0-18 record and 4-49 goals difference.

=== Borysfen Boryspil ===
On March 16, 2007 FC Borysfen Boryspil was excluded from competitions for systematic violation of statute and regulations of FFU and PFL, failure to comply with their organs of administration and implementation football justice as well as failure to fulfill terms of contracts with players and financial obligations to FFU and PFL. In the rest of games were nominated technical losses to the team and its opponents - technical victory.

=== Podillia Khmelnytskyi ===
In the second half of the season Podillia Khmelnytskyi moved from Khmelnytskyi to Krasyliv. At the same time for the amateur championship registered a new club from Khmelnytskyi, FC Podillia-Khmelnytskyi Khmelnytskyi. So, since spring 2007 there were two clubs Podillia, one at professional level playing in Krasyliv and other - amateur playing in Khmelnytskyi. One of the reasons was the prior merger of Podillia with FC Krasyliv back in 2004. At the end of 2006–07 season Podillia Krasyliv changed back to FC Krasyliv and was scheduled to play in the 2007-08 Ukrainian Second League, but withdrew just before the start of season.

Instead of Krasyliv to the Ukrainian Second League applied the newly revived FC Podillia-Khmelnytskyi Khmelnytskyi. In such manner there was created a club's continium.

=== Spartak Ivano-Frankivsk ===
FC Spartak Ivano-Frankivsk was relegated to the Ukrainian Second League, while another team form local university FC Fakel Ivano-Frankivsk obtain promotion to the Ukrainian First League. The city municipality on whose balance ended up both clubs decided to keep one and dissolve another one. So, in the 2007-08 Ukrainian Second League season there were no clubs playing from Ivano-Frankivsk, while a new team FSC Prykarpattia Ivano-Frankivsk was created in place of Fakel to participate in the 2007-08 Ukrainian First League season.

== See also ==
- 2006–07 Ukrainian Premier League
- 2006–07 Ukrainian Second League
- 2006–07 Ukrainian Cup
