= 2005–06 Ukrainian First League =

Ukrainian First League
- Season: 2005–06
- Champions: Zorya Luhansk
- Promoted: Zorya Luhansk; Karpaty Lviv
- Relegated: (all withdrew); Shakhtar-2 Donetsk; FC Bershad
- Top goalscorer: 19 - Bohdan Yesyp (Naftovyk-Ukrnafta)

The 2005–06 Ukrainian First League was the fifteenth since its establishment. There were 20 teams competing. Two teams were relegated from the 2004–05 Vyshcha Liha. Four teams were promoted from the 2004–05 Ukrainian Second League.

== Teams ==
In 2005-06 season, the Ukrainian First League consisted of the following teams:

=== Promoted teams ===
These four teams were promoted from Druha Liha at the start of the season:

==== Group A ====
- FC Enerhetyk Burshtyn – runner up (debut, promoted ahead of the winner FC Rava Rava-Ruska)
- FC Bershad – 5th place (debut, last minute swap for the withdrawn FC Nyva Vinnytsia)

==== Group B ====
- FC Krymteplytsia Molodizhne – winners (debut)

==== Group C ====
- FC Helios Kharkiv – winners (debut)

=== Relegated teams ===
Two teams were relegated from the Vyshcha Liha season:

- FC Obolon Kyiv – 15th placed (returning after three seasons)
- FC Borysfen Boryspil – 16th placed (returning after two seasons)

=== Withdrawn teams ===
- FC Nyva Vinnytsia announced that it withdraws from the league just before the season's start.

=== Location ===
Locations of teams in First League

== Managers ==
Club	Coach	Replaced coach
FC Bershad	(Ukraine) Serhiy Shevchenko	(Ukraine) Anatoliy Murakhovskyi (Ukraine) Vitaliy Sklyarenko
Borysfen Boryspil	(Ukraine) Oleksandr Prykhodko	(Ukraine) Stepan Matviyiv (Ukraine) Pavlo Irichuk
CSKA Kyiv	(Ukraine) Yuriy Maksymov	(Ukraine) Vasyl Yevseyev
Dynamo-2 Kyiv	(Ukraine) Volodymyr Onyshchenko	
Dynamo-Ihroservice Simferopol	(Ukraine) Oleh Lutkov	(Ukraine) Serhiy Lezhentsev
Enerhetyk Burshtyn	(Ukraine) Mykola Prystai	(Ukraine) Mykhaylo Savka
Hazovyk-Skala Stryi	(Ukraine) Bohdan Bandura	
Helios Kharkiv	(Ukraine) Kostiantyn Pakhomov	(Ukraine) Volodymyr Shekhovtsov (Ukraine) Rostyslav Lysenko
Karpaty Lviv	(Ukraine) Yuriy Dyachuk-Stavytskyi	
Krymteplitsia Molodizhne	(Ukraine) Oleh Fedorchuk	(Ukraine) Oleh Lutkov (Ukraine) Anvar Suleimanov
Naftovyk-Ukrnafta Okhtyrka	(Ukraine) Serhiy Shevchenko	
Obolon Kyiv	(Ukraine) Petro Slobodyan	(Ukraine) Bohdan Blavatskyi
Podillya Khmelnytskyi	(Ukraine) Serhiy Kucherenko	
Shakhtar-2 Donetsk	(Ukraine) Mykola Fedorenko	
Spartak Ivano-Frankivsk	(Ukraine) Ihor Yurchenko	(Ukraine) Mykola Prystai
Spartak Sumy	(Ukraine) Serhiy Strashnenko	(Ukraine) Volodymyr Parkhomenko (Ukraine) Valeriy Dushkov (Ukraine) Valeriy Bermudes (Ukraine) Viktor Ivanenko
Stal Dniprodzerzhynsk	(Ukraine) Viktor Maslov	
Zorya Luhansk	(Ukraine) Yuriy Koval	

== Final table ==
Pos	Team	Pld	W	D	L	GF	GA	GD	Pts	Promotion or relegation
1	Zorya Luhansk (C, P)	34	27	6	1	74	13	+61	87	Promoted to Vyshcha Liha
2	Karpaty Lviv (P)	34	25	5	4	53	14	+39	80	Promoted to Vyshcha Liha
3	Obolon Kyiv	34	22	6	6	51	19	+32	72	
4	Naftovyk-Ukrnafta Okhtyrka	34	17	7	10	50	35	+15	58	
5	Dynamo-2 Kyiv	34	15	7	12	51	36	+15	52	
6	Hazovyk-Skala Stryi	34	14	10	10	35	33	+2	52	
7	Podillya Khmelnytskyi	34	14	7	13	39	37	+2	49	
8	Stal Dniprodzerzhynsk	34	13	9	12	34	29	+5	48	
9	Krymteplitsia Molodizhne	34	12	11	11	35	34	+1	47	
10	Spartak Ivano-Frankivsk	34	10	15	9	33	31	+2	45	
11	Shakhtar-2 Donetsk (D)	34	12	8	14	37	42	−5	44	Withdrew
12	Helios Kharkiv	34	12	8	14	26	35	−9	44	
13	Dynamo-Ihroservis Simferopol	34	10	8	16	40	51	−11	38	
14	Enerhetyk Burshtyn	34	8	12	14	31	44	−13	36	
15	CSKA Kyiv	34	8	8	18	25	52	−27	32	
16	Borysfen Boryspil	34	3	14	17	23	46	−23	23	
17	Spartak Sumy	34	5	5	24	28	68	−40	20	Avoided relegation
18	FC Bershad (D)	34	3	4	27	14	60	−46	4	Withdrew

Source: www.uafootball.net.ua
(C) Champions; (D) Disqualified; (P) Promoted
- FC Nyva Vinnytsia (5th Persha Liha 2004-05) merged its operations with FC Bershad' (5th Druha Liha Hrupa A 2004-05) and moved to Bershad' and renamed the club prior to the start of the season. Three points deducted from FC Bershad for failure to comply with Federation directives (12/16/2005) and another 6 points (9 total) deducted for continual nonconformance of League directives (2/24/2006) Informed the UFF that the team is dissolved and will not play any more matches. (May 19, 2006)
- The game between Karpaty and Spartak Sumy (2:1) on March 18, 2006, was annulled by the PFL Bureau (decision of April 26) and both teams were awarded a defeat.

Persha Liha 2005-06 Winners
FC Zorya Luhansk
First title

== Top scorers ==
Statistics are taken from here.

Scorer	Goals (pen.)	Team
(Ukraine) Bohdan Yesyp	19	Naftovyk-Ukrnafta Okhtyrka
(Ukraine) Mykola Bahlay	15 (2)	Hazovyk-Skala
(Moldova) Vadym Kyrylov	14	Zoria Luhansk
(Ukraine) Pavlo Onysko	14 (1)	Krymteplytsia Molodizhne
(Ukraine) Maksym Feshchuk	12	Karpaty Lviv
(Ukraine) Valeriy Ivashchenko	12	Obolon Kyiv
(Ukraine) Kostyantyn Vizyonok	12 (2)	Zoria Luhansk
(Ukraine) Yevhen Seleznyov	11	Shakhtar-2 Donetsk
(Ukraine) Serhiy Kucherenko	11 (3)	Podillya Khmelnytskyi
(Ukraine) Bohdan Smishko	10	Zoria Luhansk
