= 2006 Ukrainian Cup final =

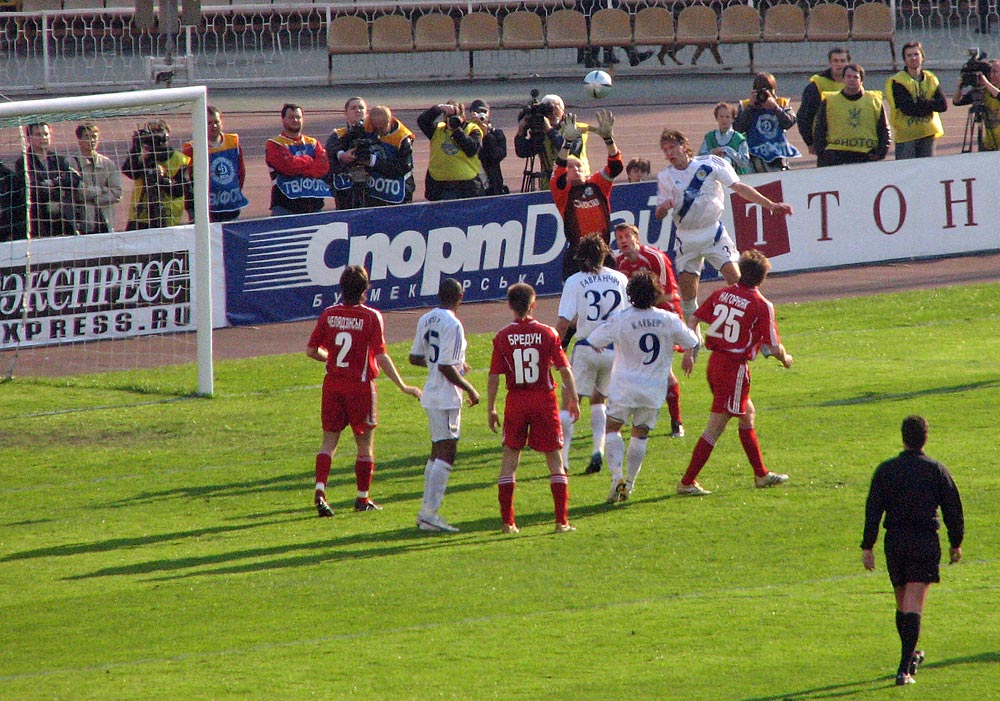
- Event: 2005–06 Ukrainian Cup
Dynamo Kyiv	Metalurh Zaporizhzhia
1	0
- Date: 2 May 2006
- Venue: NSC Olimpiyskiy, Kyiv
- Attendance: 25,000
- Weather: 16 °C

The 2006 Ukrainian Cup final was a football match that took place at the Olympic NSC on 2 May 2006. The match was the 15th Ukrainian Cup final, and it was contested by Metalurh Zaporizhzhia and Dynamo Kyiv. The Olympic stadium is the traditional arena for the Cup final.

== Road to Kyiv ==
All 16 Ukrainian Premier League clubs do not have to go through qualification to get into the competition, so Dynamo and Metalurh Zaporizhzhia both qualified for the competition automatically.

== Match details ==
2 May 2006
17:00 LST

Dynamo Kyiv	1–0	Metalurh Zaporizhzhia
Kléber 47'	Report

NSC Olimpiyskiy, Kyiv
Attendance: 25,000
Referee: Lucílio Batista (Portugal)

Dynamo Kyiv	FC Metalurh Zaporizhzhia

Dynamo Kyiv:
GK	1	(Ukraine) Oleksandr Shovkovskyi
DF	3	(Ukraine) Serhiy Fedorov
MF	5	(Ukraine) Serhii Rebrov
MF	8	(Belarus) Valiatsin Bialkevich (c)	(substituted off) 82'
FW	9	(Brazil) Kléber	(yellow card) 29'	47'
MF	15	(Brazil) Diogo Rincón	(substituted off) 86'
FW	16	(Uzbekistan) Maxim Shatskikh	(substituted off) 89'
DF	20	(Ukraine) Oleh Husyev
DF	26	(Ukraine) Andriy Nesmachny
DF	27	(Ukraine) Vladyslav Vashchuk
MF	36	(Serbia and Montenegro) Goran Gavrančić
Substitutes:
GK	55	(Ukraine) Oleksandr Rybka
DF	4	(Brazil) Rodolfo	(substituted in) 82'
MF	14	(Ukraine) Ruslan Rotan	(substituted in) 89'
FW	25	(Ukraine) Artem Milevskyi	(substituted in) 86'
FW	16	(Georgia (country)) Otar Martsvaladze
DF	30	(Morocco) Badr El Kaddouri
DF	12	(Russia) Andrei Yeshchenko
Manager:
(Ukraine) Anatoliy Demyanenko

Metalurh Zaporizhzhia:
GK	1	(Ukraine) Andriy Hlushchenko (c)
DF	2	(Belarus) Artsiom Cheliadzinski	(yellow card) 77'
DF	5	(Belarus) Syarhey Shtanyuk
MF	8	(Ukraine) Serhiy Shyshchenko	(substituted off) 69'
DF	13	(Ukraine) Yevhen Bredun	(substituted off) 62'
MF	15	(Georgia (country)) Irakli Modebadze	(substituted off) 78'
MF	16	(Georgia (country)) Dato Kvirkvelia
FW	25	(Ukraine) Serhiy Nahornyak
MF	28	(Russia) German Kutarba
FW	30	(Belarus) Wladzimir Karytska
MF	33	(Ukraine) Ruslan Liubarsky
Substitutes:
GK	12	(Ukraine) Vitaliy Postransky
MF	7	(North Macedonia) Darko Tasevski
MF	9	(Ukraine) Oleksandr Aliev	(substituted in) 69'
FW	10	(Russia) Maxim Aristarkhov	(substituted in) 78'
DF	14	(Ukraine) Volodymyr Poliovy	(substituted in) 62'
DF	20	(Ukraine) Yevhen Lozinsky
DF	23	(Ukraine) Oleh Karamushka
Manager:
(Ukraine) Vyacheslav Hrozny

MATCH OFFICIALS

- Assistant referees:
  - José Cardinal (Portugal)
  - Bertino Miranda (Portugal)
- Fourth official: Bruno Duarte (Portugal)

MATCH RULES

- 90 minutes.
- 30 minutes of extra-time if necessary.
- Penalty shoot-out if scores still level.
- Seven named substitutes
- Maximum of 3 substitutions.

Ukrainian Cup 2006 Winners

Dynamo Kyiv
Eighth title

== See also ==
- Ukrainian Cup 2005-06
- Ukrainian Premier League 2005-06
