= Serhiy Silyuk =

Ukrainian footballer

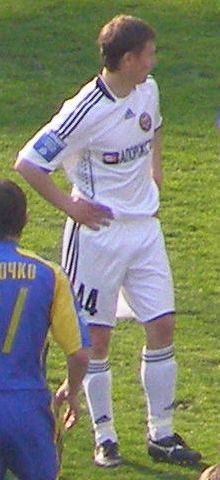

Personal information
- Full name: Serhiy Volodimirovich Silyuk
- Date of birth: 5 June 1985 (age 41)
- Place of birth: Zaporizhzhia, Ukrainian SSR, Soviet Union
- Height: 1.72 m (5 ft 8 in)
- Positions: Forward; left winger

Youth career
- 1998–2001: Metalurh Zaporizhzhia

Senior career*
Years	Team	Apps	(Gls)
2001–2009	Metalurh Zaporizhzhia	114	(18)
2001–2004	→ Metalurh-2 Zaporizhzhia	51	(10)
2010–2012	Zorya Luhansk	53	(7)
2013	Vorskla Poltava	12	(0)
2014	Araz Naxçıvan	3	(0)
2015	Spartaks Jūrmala	10	(1)
2016	Arsenal Kyiv	8	(1)
2016–2018	Tavria-Skif Rozdol		

International career
2005	Ukraine U20	2	(0)
2006	Ukraine U21	1	(0)
- * Club domestic league appearances and goals

Serhiy Silyuk (born 5 June 1985) is a Ukrainian former football forward.

== Honours ==
- Ukrainian Cup runner-up: 2006
- Participant in the 2005 FIFA World Youth Championship
- Metalurh Zaporizhzhia top scorer: 2007, 2008

== See also ==
- 2005 FIFA World Youth Championship squads#Ukraine
