= 2007–08 Ukrainian First League =

Ukrainian First League
- Season: 2007–08
- Champions: Illichivets Mariupol
- Promoted: Illichivets Mariupol; FC Lviv
- Relegated: MFK Mykolaiv (withdrew); Dnipro Cherkasy; CSKA Kyiv; Stal Dniprodzerzhynsk
- Top goalscorer: 22 - Matviy Bobal (Ihroservice Simferopol)

The 2007–08 Ukrainian First League was the seventeenth since its establishment. There were 20 teams competing. Two teams were relegated from the Ukrainian Premier League 2006-07. Four teams were promoted from the Ukrainian Second League 2006-07.

== Promotion and relegation ==
=== Promoted teams ===
These four teams were promoted from Druha Liha at the start of the season:

==== Group A ====
- FC Dnister Ovidiopil : Druha Liha champion (Debut)
- FC Prykarpattya Ivano-Frankivsk : Druha Liha runner-up (Debut)

==== Group B ====
- FC Sevastopol : Druha Liha champion (Debut)
- FC Feniks-Illichovets Kalinine : Druha Liha runner-up (Debut)

=== Relegated teams ===
Two teams were relegated from the Ukrainian Premier League 2006–07 season after finishing on the bottom of the competition:

- FC Illichivets Mariupol : 15th place (Returning after 10 seasons)
- FC Stal Alchevsk : 16th place (Returning after two seasons)

=== Renamed teams ===
- On July 24, 2007 the team of "Fakel" changed its name to "Prykarpattia".

== Teams ==
Locations of teams in First League
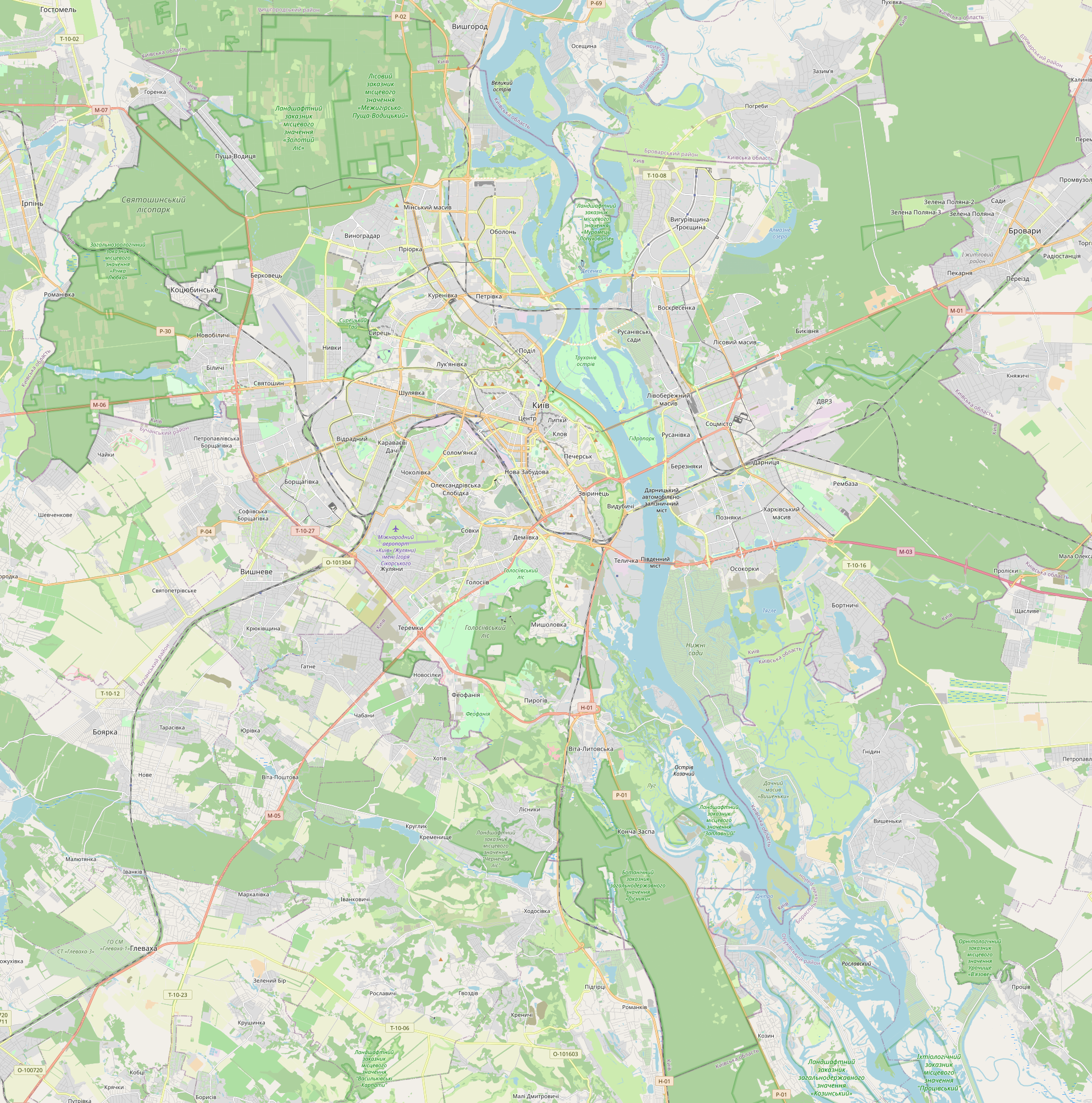
Kyiv city home venues of teams in the League

=== Stadia ===
Rank	Stadium	Capacity	Club	Region
1	Lobanovsky Dynamo Stadium	16873	FC Dynamo-2 Kyiv	Kyiv
2	MCS Rukh	16000	FSC Prykarpattya Ivano-Frankivsk	Ivano-Frankivsk
3	Illychivets	12680	FC Illichivets Mariupol	Donetsk
4	Youri Haharyn	12000	FC Desna Chernihiv	Chernihiv
5	CSK ZSU	12000	CSCA Kyiv	Kyiv
6	Avanhard	11574	FC Volyn Lutsk	Lutsk
7	Central	10321	FC Dnipro Cherkasy	Cherkasy
8	Stal	9200	FC Stal Alchevsk	Luhansk
9	SK Sevastopol	6500	PFC Sevastopol	Crimea
10	Dynamo	6000	FC Helios Kharkiv	Kharkiv
11	KSC Nika	5640	PFC Oleksandria	Kirovohrad
12	Fiolent	5000	FC Ihroservice Simferopol	Crimea
13	Enerhetyk Stadium	4000	FC Enerhetyk Burshtyn	Ivano-Frankivsk
14	Kniazha Arena	3220	FC Lviv	Lviv
15	STC Krymteplitsia	3000	FC Krymteplitsia Molodizhne	Crimea
16	Metalurh	2900	FC Stal Dniprodzerzhynsk	Dnipropetrovsk
17	Central City Stadium	1500	MFK Mykolaiv	Mykolaiv
18	Dukov Dniester Stadium	1500	FC Dniester Ovidiopol	Odesa
19	Obolon	4300	FC Obolon Kyiv	Kyiv
20	Kalinino	1050	FC Feniks-Illichovets Kalinine	Crimea

== Managers ==
Club	Coach	Replaced coach
Desna Chernihiv	(Ukraine) Oleksandr Ryabokon	(Ukraine) Serhiy Kucherenko
Dniester Ovidiopol	(Ukraine) Ihor Nehara	
Dynamo-2 Kyiv	(Ukraine) Henadiy Lytovchenko	
Enerhetyk Burshtyn	(Ukraine) Mykhaylo Savka	(Ukraine) Mykola Prystay
Feniks-Illichovets Kalinine	(Ukraine) Oleksandr Haidash	(Ukraine) Oleksiy Antyukhin
Helios Kharkiv	(Ukraine) Yuriy Pohrebnyak	(Ukraine) Ihor Nadein
Ihroservice Simferopol	(Ukraine) Serhiy Shevchenko	
Krymteplitsia Molodizhne	(Ukraine) Mykhailo Dunets	
Obolon Kyiv	(Ukraine) Ihor Artymovych (caretaker)	(Ukraine) Petro Slobodyan
PFC Oleksandria	(Ukraine) Ihor Bohatyr	
Prykarpattya Ivano-Frankivsk	(Ukraine) Serhiy Ptashnyk	
PFC Sevastopol	(Ukraine) Serhiy Puchkov	
Stal Alchevsk	(Ukraine) Vadym Plotnikov	(Ukraine) Oleh Smolyaninov (Ukraine) Hennadiy Batkayev
Volyn Lutsk	(Ukraine) Vitaliy Kvartsyanyi	
Illichivets Mariupol	(Ukraine) Oleksandr Ishchenko	(Ukraine) Semen Altman (Ukraine) Ivan Balan (caretaker)
FC Lviv	(Ukraine) Stepan Yurchyshyn	
MFC Mykolaiv	(Ukraine) Vyacheslav Mazarati	(Ukraine) Oleksandr Spitsyn (caretaker)
CSKA Kyiv	(Ukraine) Serhiy Revut	
Dnipro Cherkasy	(Ukraine) Anatoliy Bezsmertnyi	(Ukraine) Oleksandr Ryabokon
Stal Dniprodzerzhynsk	(Ukraine) Vadym Lazorenko	(Ukraine) Viktor Maslov (Ukraine) Oleksandr Shcherbakov

== Final standings ==
Pos	Team	Pld	W	D	L	GF	GA	GD	Pts	Promotion or relegation
1	Illichivets Mariupol (C, P)	38	26	7	5	65	26	+39	85	Promoted to Ukrainian Premier League
2	FC Lviv (P)	38	23	5	10	58	29	+29	74	Promoted to Ukrainian Premier League
3	Obolon Kyiv	38	22	6	10	67	42	+25	72	
4	Desna Chernihiv	38	20	7	11	61	44	+17	67	
5	Dynamo-2 Kyiv	38	19	6	13	64	52	+12	63	
6	Ihroservice Simferopol	38	18	6	14	50	45	+5	60	
7	Stal Alchevsk	38	15	13	10	52	44	+8	58	
8	PFC Oleksandria	38	14	15	9	41	32	+9	57	
9	Volyn Lutsk (Note: FC Volyn Lutsk was docked three tournament points in accordance with the decision of the Bureau of PFL of 15 April 2008.)	38	16	8	14	61	55	+6	53	
10	MFK Mykolaiv (R)	38	13	13	12	33	27	+6	52	Relegated to Ukrainian Second League (Note: MFK Mykolaiv informed the PFL season on 26 June 2008 that the City Administration of Mykolaiv will not be financing the team in the 2008/09 season. On 1 July 2008 the team was dissolved. On 17 July 2008 the club reapplies to the PFL and are readmitted into Druha Liha Group A for the 2008-09 season.)
11	Krymteplitsia Molodizhne	38	13	11	14	49	43	+6	50	
12	FC Dniester Ovidiopol	38	12	13	13	33	39	−6	49	
13	Enerhetyk Burshtyn	38	13	9	16	39	44	−5	48	
14	Helios Kharkiv	38	13	8	17	31	41	−10	47	
15	PFC Sevastopol	38	12	7	19	38	55	−17	43	
16	FC Feniks-Illichovets Kalinine	38	11	8	19	35	56	−21	41	
17	Prykarpattia Ivano-Frankivsk	38	11	6	21	37	67	−30	39	Avoided relegation (Note: Prykarpattia Ivano-Frankivsk remains in the Persha Liha after MFK Mykolaiv dissolved and relegated.)
18	Dnipro Cherkasy (Note: FC Dnipro Cherkasy docked six tournament points in accordance with the decision of the Bureau of PFL of 19 June 2008 and 3 July 2008.) (R)	38	8	17	13	43	43	0	35	Relegated to Ukrainian Second League
19	CSCA Kyiv (R)	38	7	6	25	36	74	−38	27	Relegated to Ukrainian Second League
20	Stal Dniprodzerzhynsk (R)	38	3	11	24	23	58	−35	20	Relegated to Ukrainian Second League

(C) Champions; (P) Promoted; (R) Relegated

== Top goalscorers ==
Scorer	Goals (pen.)	Team
(Ukraine) Matviy Bobal	23 (6)	Ihroservice Simferopol
(Ukraine) Pavlo Onysko	21 (1)	Obolon Kyiv
(Ukraine) Dmytro Hordienko	18 (1)	Enerhetyk Burshtyn
(Nigeria) Michael Chidi Alozi	15 (1)	FC Volyn Lutsk
(Ukraine) Oleksandr Pyschur	14 (1)	FC Volyn Lutsk
(Ukraine) Oleksandr Savanchuk	14 (7)	FC Krymteplitsia Molodizhne
(Ukraine) Oleksandr Akymenko	13 (3)	FC Stal Alchevsk
(Ukraine) Hryhoriy Baranets	12 (2)	FC Lviv
(Ukraine) Andriy Shevchuk	11	PFC Sevastopol
(Ukraine) Oleksandr Zghura	11 (5)	FC Dnister Ovidiopol

== Post-season withdrawn teams ==
On June 26, 2008 MFC Mykolaiv was withdrawn from competitions. On July 1, 2008 the club was announced about the official disbandment. Due to the public pressure and with help of Hryhoriy Surkis, it became possible to preserve the club in professional competitions. MFK Mykolaiv was admitted to the 2008-09 Ukrainian Second League instead of the third team of Dynamo, FC Dynamo-3 Kyiv.

== See also ==
- Ukrainian Second League 2007-08
- Ukrainian Premier League 2007-08
