= Metalurh Stadium =

Metalurh Stadium may refer to several stadiums in Ukraine:

- Metalurh Stadium (Kryvyi Rih)
- Metalurh Stadium (Donetsk)
- Metalurh Stadium (Kamianske)
- Metalurh Stadium, a stadium in Yenakieve
- Metalurh Stadium, a former name of Slavutych-Arena, Zaporizhia
- Metalurh Stadium, a former name of Elektrometalurh Stadium, Nikopol, Ukraine
- Metalurh Stadium, a former name of Dnipro Arena, Dnipro
