= 2005 Ukrainian Super Cup =

Dynamo Kyiv	Shakhtar Donetsk
1	1
- Shakhtar Donetsk won 4–3 on penalties
- Date: 9 July 2005
- Venue: Central Stadium "Chornomorets", Odesa
- Referee: Ihor Podushkin (Kharkiv)
- Attendance: 34,400
- Weather: 27 °C (81 °F)

The 2005 Ukrainian Super Cup became the second edition of Ukrainian Super Cup, an annual football match contested by the winners of the previous season's Ukrainian Top League and Ukrainian Cup competitions.

The match was played at the Central Stadium "Chornomorets", Odesa, on 9 July 2005, and contested by league winner Shakhtar Donetsk and cup winner Dynamo Kyiv. Shakhtar won on penalties 4–3 after the regular time ended in 1-1 draw.

== Match ==
=== Details ===
9 July 2005
20:45 EEST

Dynamo Kyiv	1–1	Shakhtar Donetsk
Byalkevich 32'	Report	Elano 5'
Penalties
Aliyev (penalty scored); Sablić (penalty missed); Gavrančić (penalty scored); Husiev (penalty scored); Shatskikh (penalty missed)	3–4	(penalty scored) Jádson; (penalty scored) Raț; (penalty scored) Tymoshchuk; (penalty scored) Stoican; (penalty missed) Srna

Central Stadium "Chornomorets", Odesa
Attendance: 34,400
Referee: Ihor Podushkin (Kharkiv)

Dynamo Kyiv	Shakhtar Donetsk

GK	1	(Ukraine) Oleksandr Shovkovskyi
DF	32	(Serbia and Montenegro) Goran Gavrančić
DF	3	(Ukraine) Serhii Fedorov
DF	13	(Croatia) Goran Sablić	(yellow card) 45'
DF	26	(Ukraine) Andrii Nesmachnyi
MF	37	(Nigeria) Ayila Yussuf
MF	14	(Ukraine) Ruslan Rotan		(substituted off) 77'
CF	5	(Ukraine) Serhii Rebrov	(yellow card) 10'	(substituted off) 39'
MF	8	(Belarus) Valyantsin Byalkevich (c)		(substituted off) 68'
MF	20	(Ukraine) Oleh Husiev	(yellow card) 33'
CF	16	(Uzbekistan) Maksim Shatskikh
Substitutes:
GK	21	(Ukraine) Taras Lutsenko
MF	88	(Ukraine) Oleksandr Aliyev		(substituted in) 68'
DF	4	(Brazil) Rodolfo
MF	11	(Bulgaria) Georgi Peev		(substituted in) 77'
CF	25	(Ukraine) Artem Milevskyi
DF	30	(Morocco) Badr El Kaddouri
MF	84	(Lithuania) Edgaras Česnauskis		(substituted in) 39'
Manager:
(Ukraine) Leonid Buriak

GK	16	(Czech Republic) Jan Laštůvka
DF	3	(Czech Republic) Tomáš Hübschman
DF	26	(Romania) Răzvan Raț
MF	21	(Serbia and Montenegro) Igor Duljaj		(substituted off) 79'
MF	38	(Brazil) Jádson
DF	33	(Croatia) Darijo Srna
MF	4	(Ukraine) Anatolii Tymoshchuk (c)
MF	18	(Poland) Mariusz Lewandowski
MF	36	(Brazil) Elano	(yellow card) 5'	(substituted off) 58'
CF	11	(Ukraine) Andrii Vorobei		(substituted off) 69'
CF	20	(Ukraine) Oleksii Bielik
Substitutes:
GK	1	(Croatia) Stipe Pletikosa
DF	5	(Ukraine) Oleh Karamushka
MF	10	(Serbia and Montenegro) Zvonimir Vukić
DF	13	(Ukraine) Viacheslav Shevchuk		(substituted in) 58'
DF	14	(Romania) Flavius Stoican		(substituted in) 79'
DF	28	(Turkey) Tolga Seyhan
CF	29	(Romania) Ciprian Marica		(substituted in) 69'
Manager:
(Romania) Mircea Lucescu

Assistant referees:
Olshanetskyi (Ivano-Frankivsk)
Skoreiko (Chernivtsi)

Match rules

- 90 minutes of regulation.
- No extra time of regulation if score is level.
- Penalty shoot-out if scores still level.
- Seven named substitutes, of which up to three may be used.

=== Statistics ===
First half
Statistic	Dynamo Kyiv	Shakhtar Donetsk
Goals scored	1	1
Total shots	7	5
Shots on target	2	3
Saves	2	1
Ball possession		
Corner kicks	0	2
Fouls committed		
Offsides	0	1
Yellow cards	3	1
Red cards	0	0

Overall
Statistic	Dynamo Kyiv	Shakhtar Donetsk
Goals scored	1	1
Total shots	10	12
Shots on target	5	3
Saves	2	4
Ball possession		
Corner kicks	3	6
Fouls committed		
Offsides	2	1
Yellow cards	3	1
Red cards	0	0
