= Kyrylo Davydov =

Ukrainian football defender

Personal information
- Full name: Kyrylo Yuriyovych Davydov
- Date of birth: 6 November 1988 (age 37)
- Place of birth: Ukrainian SSR, Soviet Union
- Height: 1.77 m (5 ft 9 1/2 in)
- Position: Midfielder

Youth career
- 2002–2005: SC Tavriya Simferopol

Senior career*
Years	Team	Apps	(Gls)
2006–2011	SC Tavriya Simferopol	2	(0)
2007	→FC Khimik Krasnoperekopsk	6	(0)

International career^{‡}
2008	Ukraine-21	2	(0)
- * Club domestic league appearances and goals as of 5 June 2011 ‡ National team caps and goals as of 5 June 2011

Kyrylo Davydov (Ukrainian: Кирилo Юрійович Давидов; born 6 November 1988) is a Ukrainian football defender who played for SC Tavriya Simferopol in the Ukrainian Premier League.

Davydov began his playing career with SC Tavriya Simferopol's youth team. He made his first team debut in the Premier League match against FC Illychivets Mariupol on 15 November 2008, but was substituted in first time.

== International career ==
He made his debut in the Ukraine national under-21 football team in a match against Netherlands-21 on 10 October 2008.
