= 2006–07 Ukrainian Second League =

Ukrainian Second League
- Season: 2006–07
- Champions: Dniester; PFC Sevastopol
- Promoted: Fakel; Feniks-Illichivets
- Top goalscorer: 21 - Oleh Hubsky (Feniks-Illichivets)
- Biggest home win: 7–0 - Dynamo-3 – Inter (Round 23)
- Biggest away win: 0–6 - Inter – Nafkom (Round 26)
- Highest scoring: 6–2 - Sevastopol – Shakhtar-3 (Round 12); 4–4 - Hirnik – Olimipik (Round 29)
- Highest attendance: 6,000 - Kremin–Arsenal (Round 23); Kremin–Olimipik (Round 27)

The 2006–07 Ukrainian Second League was the 16th season of 3rd level professional football in Ukraine. The competitions were divided into two groups – A and B. This was a consolidation of the Second League from three groups in the previous season to two, due to the number of team withdrawal.

== Team changes ==
=== Newly admitted ===
The following team was promoted from the 2006 Ukrainian Football Amateur League:

- FC Lokomotyv Dvorichna – (debut)

The 2005 Ukrainian Football Amateur League participant:

- FC Feniks-Illichivets Kalinine – (debut)

=== Relegated from the First League ===
- none

=== Renamed ===
- FC Inter Boyarka before the start of the season changed its name from FC Boyarka-2006

=== Location map ===
Locations of team home grounds in Ukrainian Second League 2008–09

== Group A ==
| Pos | Team | Pld | W | D | L | GF | GA | GD | Pts | Promotion or relegation |
|---|---|---|---|---|---|---|---|---|---|---|
| 1 | FC Dnister Ovidiopol (C, P) | 28 | 18 | 8 | 2 | 44 | 12 | +32 | 62 | Promoted to First League |
| 2 | FC Fakel Ivano-Frankivsk (P) | 28 | 18 | 5 | 5 | 39 | 18 | +21 | 59 | Promoted to First League |
| 3 | FC Yednist Plysky | 28 | 16 | 6 | 6 | 50 | 24 | +26 | 54 | |
| 4 | FC Nyva Ternopil | 28 | 15 | 8 | 5 | 33 | 15 | +18 | 53 | |
| 5 | FC Kniazha Schaslyve | 28 | 14 | 9 | 5 | 34 | 24 | +10 | 51 | |
| 6 | FC Nafkom Brovary | 28 | 13 | 7 | 8 | 40 | 30 | +10 | 46 | |
| 7 | FC Ros Bila Tserkva | 28 | 13 | 4 | 11 | 36 | 32 | +4 | 43 | |
| 8 | FC Karpaty-2 Lviv | 28 | 10 | 9 | 9 | 41 | 35 | +6 | 39 | |
| 9 | FC Enerhiya Pivdenoukrainsk | 28 | 10 | 7 | 11 | 33 | 30 | +3 | 37 | |
| 10 | FC Bukovyna Chernivtsi | 28 | 5 | 12 | 11 | 22 | 40 | −18 | 27 | |
| 11 | FC Dynamo-3 Kyiv | 28 | 5 | 10 | 13 | 29 | 32 | −3 | 25 | |
| 12 | FC Obolon-2 Kyiv | 28 | 5 | 9 | 14 | 26 | 45 | −19 | 24 | |
| 13 | FC Veres Rivne | 28 | 5 | 7 | 16 | 24 | 44 | −20 | 22 | |
| 14 | FC Naftovyk Dolyna | 28 | 3 | 7 | 18 | 14 | 40 | −26 | 16 | |
| 15 | FC Inter Boyarka | 28 | 3 | 6 | 19 | 17 | 61 | −44 | 15 | Withdrew (Note: FC Inter Boyarka completed the season but failed to submit a license for the following season.) |

(C) Champions; (P) Promoted

=== Top goalscorers ===
| Scorer | Goals | Team |
|---|---|---|
| (Ukraine) Oleksiy Oleshko | 17 (7) | FC Yednist' Plysky |
| (Ukraine) Artem Miroshnychenko | 15 | FC Yednist' Plysky |
| (Ukraine) Oleksandr Semenyuk | 12 (3) | FC Nyva Ternopil |
| (Ukraine) Dmytro Hordiyenko | 12 (4) | FC Ros Bila Tserkva |
| (Ukraine) Ihor Melnyk | 10 (1) | FC Karpaty-2 Lviv |
| (Ukraine) Oleksandr Mykulyak | 10 (3) | FC Fakel Ivano-Frankivsk |
| (Ukraine) Oleksandr Misko | 10 (9) | FC Ros Bila Tserkva |

== Group B ==
=== Standings ===
| Pos | Team | Pld | W | D | L | GF | GA | GD | Pts | Promotion or relegation |
|---|---|---|---|---|---|---|---|---|---|---|
| 1 | PFC Sevastopol (C, P) | 28 | 21 | 1 | 6 | 58 | 21 | +37 | 64 | Promoted to First League |
| 2 | FC Feniks-Illichivets Kalinine (P) | 28 | 17 | 6 | 5 | 42 | 22 | +20 | 57 | Promoted to First League |
| 3 | FC Titan Armyansk | 28 | 16 | 8 | 4 | 48 | 21 | +27 | 56 | |
| 4 | FC Illichivets-2 Mariupol | 28 | 17 | 3 | 8 | 36 | 35 | +1 | 54 | |
| 5 | FC Khimik Krasnoperekopsk | 28 | 13 | 7 | 8 | 35 | 28 | +7 | 46 | |
| 6 | FC Hirnik Kryvyi Rih | 28 | 13 | 5 | 10 | 46 | 41 | +5 | 44 | |
| 7 | FC Olkom Melitopol | 28 | 10 | 8 | 10 | 35 | 29 | +6 | 38 | |
| 8 | FC Shakhtar-3 Donetsk | 28 | 10 | 6 | 12 | 42 | 50 | −8 | 36 | |
| 9 | FC Arsenal Kharkiv | 28 | 10 | 4 | 14 | 35 | 42 | −7 | 34 | |
| 10 | FC Olimpik Donetsk | 28 | 8 | 8 | 12 | 35 | 41 | −6 | 32 | |
| 11 | FC Hazovyk-KhGV Kharkiv | 28 | 8 | 7 | 13 | 20 | 36 | −16 | 31 | |
| 12 | FC Metalurh-2 Zaporizhzhia | 28 | 9 | 3 | 16 | 26 | 40 | −14 | 30 | |
| 13 | FC Yavir Krasnopilya | 28 | 6 | 7 | 15 | 18 | 30 | −12 | 25 | |
| 14 | FC Kremin Kremenchuk | 28 | 6 | 7 | 15 | 20 | 35 | −15 | 25 | |
| 15 | FC Hirnyk-Sport Komsomolsk | 28 | 5 | 2 | 21 | 23 | 48 | −25 | 17 | |
| - | FC Lokomotyv Dvorichna | 0 | - | - | - | - | - | — | 0 | Results expunged (Note: FC Lokomotyv Dvorichna obtained a professional license and entered the PFL, played 4 games before going bankrupt and were expelled. Their record was one win and 3 losses with 3 goals scored and 6 goals against. Their results were officially removed from the competition. (August 29th, 2006)) |

(C) Champions; (P) Promoted

=== Top goalscorers ===
| Scorer | Goals | Team |
|---|---|---|
| (Ukraine) Oleh Hubsky | 21 (8) | FC Feniks-Illichivets Kalinine |
| (Ukraine) Vitaliy Prokopchenko | 18 (4) | FC Titan Armyansk |
| (Ukraine) Andriy Shevchuk | 12 | PFC Sevastopol |
| (Ukraine) Oleksiy Mazurenko | 11 | PFC Sevastopol |
| (Ukraine) Vyacheslav Shaenko | 11 (2) | FC Arsenal Kharkiv |

== See also ==
- 2006–07 Ukrainian Premier League
- 2006–07 Ukrainian First League
- 2006–07 Ukrainian Cup
