= Volodymyr Kornutyak =

Ukrainian footballer

Personal information
- Full name: Volodymyr Petrovych Kornutyak
- Date of birth: 24 July 1983 (age 43)
- Place of birth: Chop, Ukrainian SSR, Soviet Union
- Height: 1.80 m (5 ft 11 in)
- Position: Defender

Senior career*
Years	Team	Apps	(Gls)
2002–2007	Zakarpattia Uzhhorod	11	(0)
2002	→ Zakarpattia-2 Uzhhorod	11	(0)
2008	Prykarpattya Ivano-Frankivsk	12	(0)
2009	Kharkiv	4	(0)
2010–2012	Beregvidek Berehove		
2013	Várda	13	(0)
2013	F. Medvidya Nove Davydkovo		
2013–2016	Kisvárda	62	(1)
2016–2017	Nyírbátor	27	(0)
2017–2020	Mynai	22	(3)
2020–2021	Khust		
- * Club domestic league appearances and goals

Volodymyr Petrovych Kornutyak (Ukrainian: Володимир Петрович Корнутяк; born 24 July 1983) is a Ukrainian former football defender.
