= FC Lokomotyv Dvorichna =

Association football club

FC Lokomotiv Dvorichna was a Ukrainian football club based in Dvorichna.

== History ==
It applied for a licence in the Professional Football League of Ukraine in 2006, and was placed in the Druha Liha Group B. However, after only four games, the club became defunct due to loss of financial support. The four games it played (lost to Olimpik Donetsk, beat Yavir Krasnopilya, lost to Khimik Krasnoperekopsk, lost to Hazovyk-KhGV Kharkiv) were stricken from the records. It also played in the Ukrainian Cup 2006-07, where it was eliminated in its first match by FC Kharkiv.

== Selected players ==
- Andriy Kiva
