= Irakli Liluashvili =

Georgian footballer

Personal information
- Full name: Irakli Liluashvili
- Date of birth: 13 October 1984 (age 42)
- Place of birth: Tbilisi, Georgian SSR, Soviet Union
- Height: 1.80 m (5 ft 11 in)
- Position: Forward

Senior career*
Years	Team	Apps	(Gls)
2003	Zorya Luhansk	5	(0)
2004–2006	Tbilisi	23	(8)
2006	Stal Dniprodzerzhynsk	14	(1)
2006–2007	Zemplín Michalovce	11	(4)
2007–2010	Nitra	5	(2)
2010	Dinamo Tbilisi	7	(1)
2011–2012	Chikhura Sachkhere	12	(3)
Total		77	(19)
- * Club domestic league appearances and goals as of 12 October 2011 ‡ National team caps and goals as of 5 April 2012

Irakli Liluashvili (born 13 October 1984) is a Georgian footballer who recently played for Umaglesi Liga club Chikhura Sachkhere.

== Career ==
He played for Nitra in the 2008 UEFA Intertoto Cup.
