= Artem Miroshnychenko =

Ukrainian footballer

Personal information
- Full name: Artem Volodymyrovych Miroshnychenko
- Date of birth: 9 November 1978 (age 47)
- Place of birth: Ukrainian SSR, Soviet Union
- Height: 1.80 m (5 ft 11 in)
- Position: Midfielder

Senior career*
Years	Team	Apps	(Gls)
1998–2001	Obolon Kyiv	2	(0)
1998–2001	→ Obolon-2 Kyiv	25	(1)
2003–2004	Yevropa Pryluky	19	(3)
2005	Metalist-UHMK Kyiv	4	(0)
2005–2007	Yednist Plysky	42	(18)
2007–2011	Obolon Kyiv	78	(18)
2007	→ Obolon-2 Kyiv	1	(2)
- * Club domestic league appearances and goals

Artem Volodymyrovych Miroshnychenko (Ukrainian: Артем Володимирович Мірошниченко; born 9 November 1978) is a Ukrainian former professional football midfielder.

== Career ==
Miroshnychenko started his football career at amateur level playing for the second team of FC Obolon Kyiv.
