= Ivan Shyshkin =

Ukrainian footballer (born 1983)

Personal information
- Date of birth: 16 September 1983 (age 43)
- Place of birth: Magdeburg, East Germany
- Height: 1.83 m (6 ft 0 in)
- Position: Midfielder

Senior career*
Years	Team	Apps	(Gls)
1999–2002	Chayka-VMS Sevastopol	38	(0)
2002–2011	Sevastopol	152	(4)
2008	→ Sevastopol-2	9	(0)
2011	Nyva Ternopil	10	(0)
2013–2014	Slavutych Cherkasy	30	(3)
2015	SKChF Sevastopol	24	(3)
2016–2019	KAMO Sevastopol		
- * Club domestic league appearances and goals

Ivan Shyshkin (born 16 September 1983) is a former Ukrainian football midfielder.
