= Mykola Bahlay =

Ukrainian footballer (born 1976)

Personal information
- Full name: Mykola Ivanovych Bahlay
- Date of birth: 29 October 1976 (age 50)
- Place of birth: Deviatyr, Nesterov Raion, Ukrainian SSR
- Position: Forward

Youth career
- 1993: SSSOR Lviv

Senior career*
Years	Team	Apps	(Gls)
1995–1996	FC Skala Stryi	34	(0)
1997–1998	FC Karpaty-2 Lviv	17	(0)
1998–1999	FC Dynamo Lviv	27	(12)
2000–2001	FC Lviv	45	(6)
2001	FC Prykarpattia Ivano-Frankivsk	17	(0)
2001	FC Enerhetyk Burshtyn	1	(0)
2002	FC Sokil Zolochiv	21	(3)
2003–2006	FC Hazovyk-Skala Stryi	79	(18)
2006–2007	FC Lviv	25	(4)
2012	FC Halychyna Bibrka	3	(3)
- * Club domestic league appearances and goals

Mykola Ivanovych Bahlay (Ukrainian: Микола Іванович Баглай; born 29 October 1976, Deviatyr, Lviv Oblast) is a Ukrainian former football forward who mostly played for Lviv-based clubs.
