= 2006–07 Vyshcha Liha =

16th season of top-tier football league in Vyshcha Liha

Vyshcha Liha
- Season: 2006–07
- Champions: Dynamo Kyiv; 12th title
- Runner up: Shakhtar Donetsk
- Relegated: Illichivets Mariupol, Stal Alchevsk
- Champions League: Dynamo Kyiv (3rd Qualifying Round); Shakhtar Donetsk (2nd Qualifying Round)
- UEFA Cup: Metalist Kharkiv (1st Round); Dnipro Dnipropetrovsk (2nd Qualifying Round)
- Intertoto Cup: Chornomorets Odesa (2nd Round)
- Matches: 240
- Goals: 515 (2.15 per match)
- Top goalscorer: Oleksandr Hladky (13) (FC Kharkiv)
- Biggest home win: (5:0) - Shakhtar-Metalist; Shakhtar-Kyvbas
- Biggest away win: (0:5) - Metalurh Z.-Dynamo
- Highest scoring: (5:2) - Dynamo-Arsenal
- Highest attendance: 28,880 - Metalist-Dynamo
- Lowest attendance: 500 - Arsenal-Metalurh D. Metalurh D.-Illichivets
- Average attendance: 9,266

The 2006–07 Vyshcha Liha season was the sixteenth since its establishment. Shakhtar Donetsk were the defending champions. Soyuz-Viktan became the first title sponsor in the League's history.

The season started on 21 July 2006, with the game in Kyiv, Dynamo - Chornomorets 4–1. The last day of the competition was 17 June 2007. The winner of the championship was declared Dynamo Kyiv acquiring their record-extending 12th title defeating the reigning champion Shakhtar Donetsk, who were the two-time defending champions.

Illichivets was forced into relegation for the first time since entering the League 10 years ago. Stal was relegated as well. It was the second time for that club.

The game Karpaty-Metalist finished with a technical loss awarded to Lviv's club for no appearance.

== Teams ==
=== Promoted ===
- FC Zorya Luhansk, champion of the 2005-06 Ukrainian First League – (returning after absence of 10 seasons)
- FC Karpaty Lviv, runner-up of the 2005-06 Ukrainian First League – (returning after absence of 2 seasons)

=== Location map ===
Locations of team home grounds in Ukrainian Premier League 2006–07

== Managers ==
Club	Coach	Replaced coach
Arsenal Kyiv	(Ukraine) Oleksandr Zavarov	
Chornomorets Odesa	(Ukraine) Semen Altman	
Dnipro Dnipropetrovsk	(Ukraine) Oleh Protasov	
Dynamo Kyiv	(Ukraine) Anatoliy Demyanenko	
Karpaty Lviv	(Ukraine) Oleksandr Ischenko	
Kharkiv	(Ukraine) Volodymyr Bezsonov	(Ukraine) Volodymyr Kulayev (Ukraine) Mykhaylo Stelmakh
Kryvbas Kryvyi Rih	(Ukraine) Oleh Taran	(Ukraine) Oleksandr Kosevych
Metalist Kharkiv	(Ukraine) Myron Markevych	
Metalurh Donetsk	(Belgium) Jos Daerden	(Spain) Pichi Alonso (Netherlands) Co Adriaanse
Metalurh Zaporizhzhia	(Ukraine) Anatoliy Chantsev	(Ukraine) Serhiy Yashchenko
Illichivets Mariupol	(Ukraine) Yuriy Kerman	(Ukraine) Ivan Balan
Shakhtar Donetsk	(Romania) Mircea Lucescu	
Tavriya Simferopol	(Ukraine) Mykhaylo Fomenko	
Vorskla Poltava	(Ukraine) Viktor Nosov	
Stal Alchevsk	(Netherlands) Ton Caanen	
Zorya Luhansk	(Ukraine) Oleksandr Kosevych	(Ukraine) Yuriy Koval (Ukraine) Volodymyr Bezsonov (Ukraine) Volodymyr Malyhin

== League table ==
Pos	Team	Pld	W	D	L	GF	GA	GD	Pts	Qualification or relegation
1	Dynamo Kyiv (C)	30	22	8	0	67	23	+44	74	Qualification to Champions League third qualifying round
2	Shakhtar Donetsk	30	19	6	5	57	20	+37	63	Qualification to Champions League second qualifying round
3	Metalist Kharkiv	30	18	7	5	40	20	+20	61	Qualification to UEFA Cup first round
4	Dnipro Dnipropetrovsk	30	11	14	5	32	24	+8	47	Qualification to UEFA Cup second qualifying round
5	Tavriya Simferopol	30	12	6	12	32	30	+2	42	
6	Chornomorets Odesa	30	11	8	11	36	33	+3	41	Qualification to Intertoto Cup second round
7	Metalurh Zaporizhzhya	30	10	10	10	25	32	−7	40	
8	Karpaty Lviv	30	9	10	11	26	32	−6	37	
9	Metalurh Donetsk	30	9	9	12	26	35	−9	36	
10	Kryvbas Kryvyi Rih	30	7	14	9	29	36	−7	35	
11	Zorya Luhansk	30	9	7	14	23	43	−20	34	
12	FC Kharkiv	30	8	9	13	26	38	−12	33	
13	Vorskla Poltava	30	7	10	13	23	28	−5	31	
14	Arsenal Kyiv	30	7	9	14	28	44	−16	30	
15	Illichivets Mariupol (R)	30	6	7	17	23	39	−16	25	Relegated to Ukrainian First League
16	Stal Alchevsk (R)	30	5	6	19	22	38	−16	21	Relegated to Ukrainian First League

Source: uafootball.net.ua
(C) Champions; (R) Relegated

== Results ==
Home \ Away	ARK	CHO	DNI	DYN	ILL	KAR	KHA	KRY	MET	MDO	MZA	SHA	STA	TAV	VOR	ZOR
Arsenal Kyiv	—	1–1	1–1	0–1	2–0	1–0	1–1	1–1	0–0	0–2	1–0	1–2	1–3	0–1	1–0	2–2
Chornomorets Odesa	2–0	—	0–1	2–3	2–1	1–0	4–2	2–3	1–3	2–0	1–1	0–0	3–0	0–0	2–0	2–0
Dnipro	1–1	1–0	—	0–2	1–1	2–2	1–0	1–1	0–2	2–0	1–1	1–1	0–0	2–0	1–0	3–0
Dynamo Kyiv	5–2	4–1	2–0	—	1–0	3–1	2–0	3–1	2–0	0–0	3–1	1–0	3–1	2–1	1–1	4–0
Illichivets Mariupol	4–1	0–0	1–1	2–3	—	1–2	2–1	0–1	0–3	0–2	1–0	1–1	0–0	1–0	2–0	0–1
Karpaty Lviv	1–1	0–1	0–1	1–0	1–0	—	1–0	1–1	-:+	0–0	0–0	0–0	3–1	0–2	1–2	1–0
FC Kharkiv	2–0	0–1	0–0	0–2	2–0	0–0	—	2–0	0–0	0–0	0–0	0–3	0–0	1–1	3–2	2–2
Kryvbas Kryvyi Rih	1–0	2–2	1–1	1–1	0–0	3–0	3–1	—	0–3	1–1	1–1	0–1	1–0	0–0	0–0	2–0
Metalist Kharkiv	5–1	4–0	1–0	0–2	2–0	1–1	2–0	0–0	—	1–0	1–0	0–1	1–0	1–0	2–1	1–0
Metalurh Donetsk	2–1	1–0	1–1	1–1	2–1	3–3	1–2	2–1	0–2	—	1–0	0–0	2–1	1–2	0–0	3–2
Metalurh Zaporizhzhya	2–1	1–0	1–1	0–5	2–1	1–2	3–1	1–1	0–0	2–0	—	0–3	1–0	1–0	0–0	1–0
Shakhtar Donetsk	0–1	2–0	2–3	2–2	3–1	4–1	1–2	5–0	5–0	2–1	0–2	—	3–1	3–0	2–1	3–0
Stal Alchevsk	1–1	2–1	3–1	1–1	0–2	0–1	4–2	0–0	0–1	3–0	0–1	0–2	—	0–1	0–1	0–1
Tavriya Simferopol	1–3	1–1	0–0	2–4	1–0	0–1	2–0	3–1	2–0	2–0	5–1	1–3	2–1	—	1–0	1–2
Vorskla Poltava	0–1	0–0	0–1	1–1	3–0	1–2	0–1	2–1	2–2	2–0	2–1	0–1	1–0	0–0	—	1–1
Zorya Luhansk	2–1	0–4	0–3	1–2	1–1	1–0	0–1	2–1	2–2	1–0	0–0	0–2	1–0	1–0	0–0	—

Source: uafootball.net.ua
Legend: Blue = home team win; Yellow = draw; Red = away team win.

== Top goal scorers ==
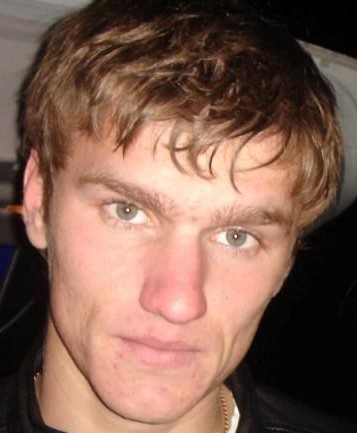
Hladkyi

(Ukraine) Oleksandr Hladky	Kharkiv	13 (3)
(Georgia (country)) Vasil Gigiadze	Kryvbas Kryvyi Rih	11 (4)
(Belarus) Siarhey Karnilenka	Dnipro Dnipropetrovsk	10
(Brazil) William Batista	Karpaty Lviv	10 (2)
(Ukraine) Serhiy Nazarenko	Dnipro Dnipropetrovsk	10 (2)
(Uzbekistan) Maksim Shatskikh	Dynamo Kyiv	9
(Brazil) Brandão	Shakhtar Donetsk	9 (1)
(Ukraine) Serhiy Danylovskyi	Chornomorets Odesa	8
(Brazil) Kleber	Dynamo Kyiv	8
(Brazil) Diogo Rincon	Dynamo Kyiv	8 (2)

== Stadia ==
The locations of the 16 teams participating in Vyscha Liha season 2006-07.

Rank	Stadium	Capacity	Club	High att.	Opponent
1	Chornomorets Stadium	34,362	Chornomorets Odesa	14800	Dnipro Dniporpetrovsk
2	Shakhtar Stadium	31,718	Metalurh Donetsk	22000	Shakhtar Donetsk
3	Avanhard Stadium	31,243	Zorya Luhansk	20000	Dynamo Kyiv; Shakhtar Donetsk
4	Metalist Stadium	30,133	Metalist Kharkiv; FC Kharkiv	28800; 14000	Dynamo Kyiv; Metalist Kharkiv
5	Metalurh Stadium	29,782	Kryvbas Kryvyi Rih	18000	Dynamo Kyiv
6	Ukraina Stadium	28,051	Karpaty Lviv	28180	Shakhtar Donetsk
7	RSK Olimpiyskiy	25,831	Shakhtar Donetsk	26100	Dynamo Kyiv
8	Vorskla Stadium	25,000	Vorskla Poltava	17000	Dynamo Kyiv
9	Stadium Meteor	24,381	Dnipro Dnipropetrovsk	20500	Shakhtar Donetsk
10	Lokomotiv Stadium	19,978	Tavriya Simferopol	20000	Dynamo Kyiv
11	Lobanovsky Dynamo Stadium	16,873	Dynamo Kyiv; Arsenal Kyiv	18000; 4700	Dnipro Dniporpetrovsk; Dynamo Kyiv
12	Illychivets Stadium	12,680	Illychivets Mariupol	12500	Shakhtar Donetsk
13	Slavutych Arena	11,983	Metalurh Zaporizhzhya	11500	Dynamo Kyiv
14	Stal Stadium	9,200	Stal Alchevsk	9000	Shakhtar Donetsk

=== Auxiliary or former home stadiums ===
Rank	Stadium	Capacity	Club	High att.	Opponent	Notes
1	NSC Olimpiysky	83,450	Arsenal Kyiv	2100	Illichivets Mariupol	8 games
2	Kolos Stadium	5,654	Arsenal Kyiv	1100	FC Kharkiv	Only game

== See also ==
- 2006–07 Ukrainian First League
- 2006–07 Ukrainian Second League
- 2006–07 Ukrainian Cup
