= Yevheniy Lozinskyi =

Ukrainian footballer

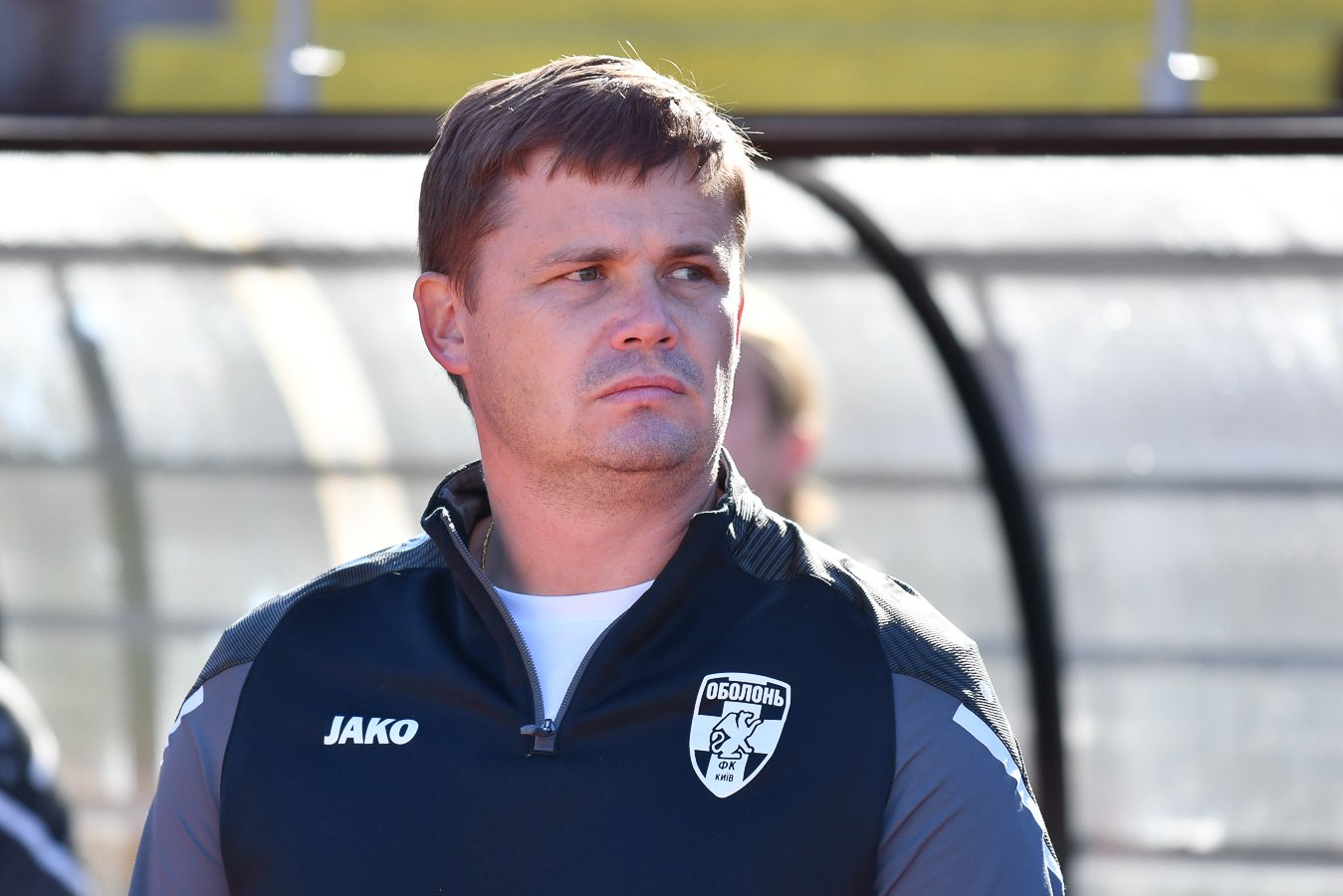

Personal information
- Full name: Yevheniy Petrovych Lozinskyi
- Date of birth: 7 February 1982 (age 44)
- Place of birth: Lviv, Ukrainian SSR, Soviet Union
- Height: 1.86 m (6 ft 1 in)
- Position: Defender

Team information
- Current team: Obolon Kyiv U19 (head coach)

Senior career*
Years	Team	Apps	(Gls)
1999–2004	FC Dynamo Kyiv	0	(0)
1999–2004	FC Dynamo-3 Kyiv	53	(2)
1999–2001	FC Dynamo-2 Kyiv	23	(3)
2002	→ FC Zakarpattia Uzhhorod (loan)	13	(0)
2004–2005	FC Zakarpattia Uzhhorod	26	(0)
2006	FC Metalurh Zaporizhya	9	(0)
2007–2011	FC Obolon Kyiv	83	(5)
2011–2012	FC Zorya Luhansk	4	(0)
2012–	FC Poltava	5	(0)
- * Club domestic league appearances and goals as of 10 May 2013

Yevheniy Petrovych Lozinskyi (Ukrainian: Євген Петрович Лозинський; born 7 February 1982) is a Ukrainian retired professional football defender and current head coach of Obolon Kyiv U19.

== Career ==
Lozinskyi began his playing career with FC Dynamo Kyiv's third team. Than he joined different Ukrainian teams, and in 2008 he signed a contract with FC Obolon Kyiv until 30 June 2012.
