= FC Nyva Bershad =

Nyva Bershad
- Full name: FC Nyva Bershad
- League: Vinnytsia Oblast Football League
- 2013–14: 2nd, Group B

Nyva Bershad is a Ukrainian football club and currently competes in the Vinnytsia Oblast Football League is from Bershad, Vinnytsia Oblast.

== History ==
From 1996 the team competed in the Vinnytsia Oblast Football League replacing FC Sportinvest Kryvyi Rih. In the 1996–97 the club entered the Ukrainian Second League and during this period becomes a farm club for Nyva Vinnytsia. However, by the start of the 1998–99 plays only 4 matches and removes itself from the competition and returns to the amateur competition.

The club returns to the Ukrainian Second League for the 2004–05 season. In the next season the club takes over the place of Nyva Vinnytsia in 2005–06 season. The club competes until the 29th Round and then it withdraws.

The club reorganized itself and return to the Vinnytsia Oblast Football League where it competes now.

Year	Name
1996–2004	Nyva Bershad
2004–2006	FC Bershad
2006–current	Nyva Bershad

== League and cup history ==
Season	Div.	Pos.	Pl.	W	D	L	GS	GA	P	Domestic Cup	Europe	Notes
1996–97	3rd "A"	9	30	11	6	13	31	36	39	1/64 finals		
1997–98	3rd "B"	13	32	9	8	15	39	46	35	1/128 finals		
1998–99	3rd "B"	16	0	0	0	0	0	0	0			Withdrew
1999–2004	Club competes in the Oblast League											
2004–05	3rd "A"	5	28	14	7	7	33	21	49	1/32 finals		Promoted
2005–06	2nd	18	34	3	4	27	14	60	4	1/32 finals		−9 – Withdraw
