= Bohdan Bandura =

Soviet and Ukrainian footballer

Personal information
- Full name: Bohdan Romanovych Bandura
- Date of birth: 30 January 1960 (age 66)
- Place of birth: Kiselyovsk, Russian SFSR, Soviet Union
- Height: 1.80 m (5 ft 11 in)
- Position: Forward

Senior career*
Years	Team	Apps	(Gls)
1980	FC Avanhard Rivne	17	(1)
1981	SKA Lviv	21	(0)
1982–1987	SKA-Karpaty Lviv	182	(42)
1987–1988	FC Avanhard Rivne	63	(16)
1989	FC Karpaty Lviv	16	(6)
1991	FC Karpaty Kamianka-Buzka	25	(7)
1992–1993	FC Skala Stryi	16	(4)
1993–1995	FC Lviv	61	(36)

Managerial career
- 1992: FC Skala Stryi (assistant)
- 2001–2002: FC Karpaty-2 Lviv
- 2003–2006: FC Hazovyk-Skala Stryi
- 2006–2007: FC Lviv
- 2016–2017: FC Lviv (assistant)
- 2017: NK Veres Rivne (U-21)
- 2018: FC Lviv (assistant)
- * Club domestic league appearances and goals

Bohdan Bandura (Ukrainian: Богдан Романович Бандура; born 30 January 1960) is a former Soviet and Ukrainian professional football midfielder and current Ukrainian coach.

== Career ==
Bandura is better known for obtaining promotion for Hazovyk-Skala Stryi to the First League and later becoming the first coach of a new FC Lviv.
