= Myroslav Bundash =

Ukrainian footballer

Personal information
- Full name: Myroslav Omelyanovych Bundash
- Date of birth: 22 December 1976 (age 49)
- Place of birth: Ukrainian SSR, Soviet Union
- Height: 1.67 m (5 ft 6 in)
- Position: Forward

Team information
- Current team: FC Uzhhorod (manager assistant)

Senior career*
Years	Team	Apps	(Gls)
1995	FC Karpaty Mukacheve	4	(0)
1998–2005	FC Zakarpattia Uzhhorod	225	(81)
2001–2002	→ FC Zakarpattia-2 Uzhhorod (loan)	3	(1)
2005	FK Riga	11	(0)
2006–2008	FC Zakarpattia Uzhhorod		
2008	FC Atyrau	10	(0)
2009	FC Zirka Kirovohrad	16	(5)
2010	FC Mukacheve		
2010	PFC Sumy	1	(0)
2011–2012	FC Mukacheve		
2013	FC Meteor Petrialove		
2014	FC Artos Hat Hat		
2015–2016	FC Uzhhorod		
2017–2018	FC Serednie		

International career
2001	Ukraine (students)		

Managerial career
- 2012–2016: FC Hoverla Uzhhorod (assistant)
- 2019–: FC Uzhhorod (assistant)
Medal record
Men's football
Representing Ukraine
Summer Universiade
Silver medal – second place	2001 Beijing	Team competition
- * Club domestic league appearances and goals

Myroslav Omelyanovych Bundash (Ukrainian: Мирослав Омелянович Бундаш; born 22 December 1976) is a former Ukrainian footballer. Since 2012 he coaches professional clubs as an assistant coach.
