= Ihor Podushkin =

Ukrainian football referee

- Born: 1 November 1963 (age 62)

Domestic
Years	League	Role
1993–2009	Ukrainian Premier League	Referee

Ihor Podushkin (born 1 November 1963) is a former football referee.
