= Metalurh Stadium (Kamianske) =

Football stadium in Kamianske, Ukraine

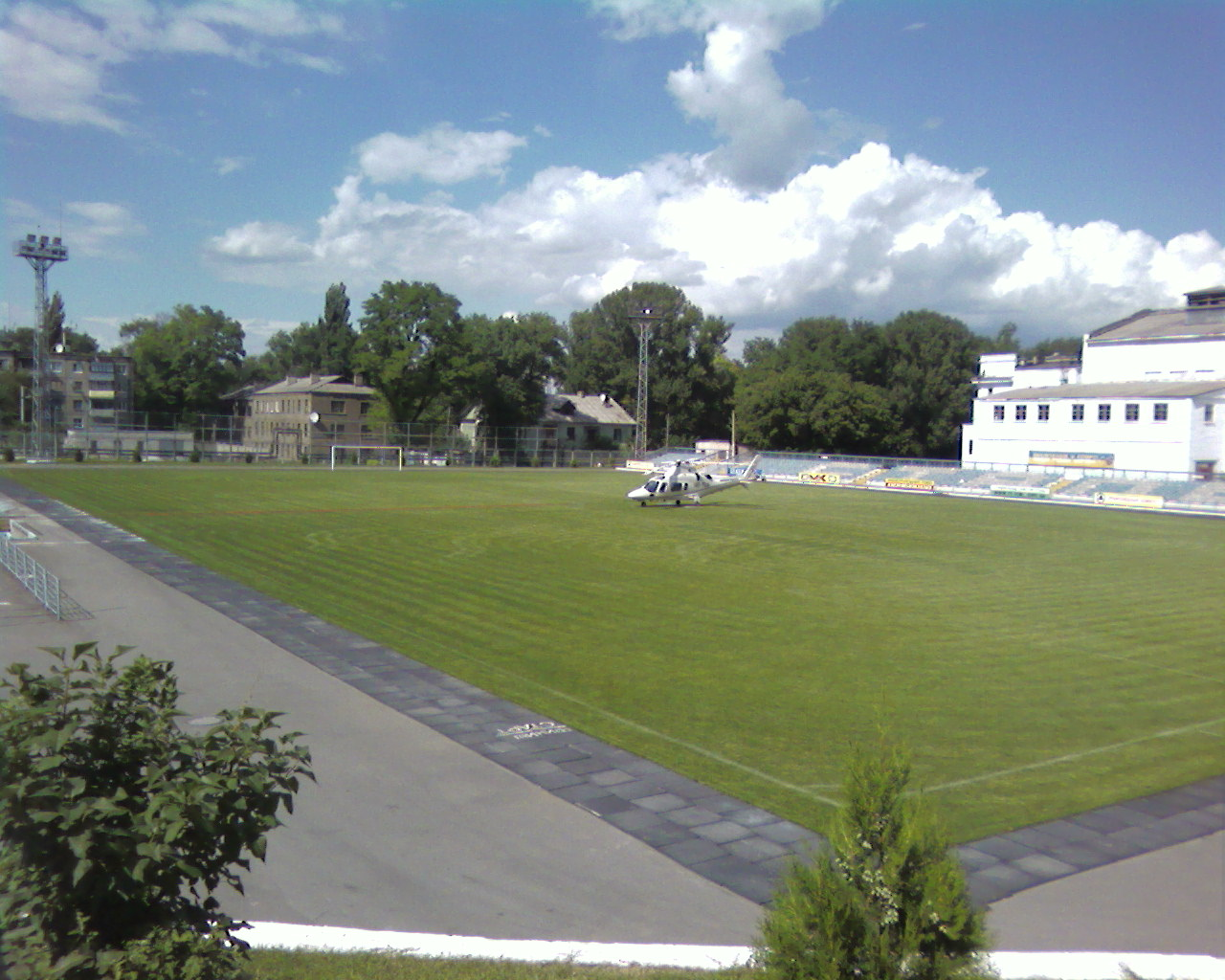
- Interactive map of Metalurh Stadium
- Location: Kamianske, Ukraine
- Coordinates: 48.517616°N 34.597351°E
- Owner: Stal Kamianske
- Capacity: 2,900 (football)
- Surface: Grass
- Field size: 104 m × 68 m (114 yd × 74 yd)

Construction
- Opened: 1933
- Renovated: 2003

Tenant
- Stal Kamianske (until 2015)

Metalurh Stadium is a football-only stadium in Kamianske, Ukraine. It is currently used for football matches, and is the home of Stal Kamianske. The stadium's official maximum capacity is 2,900.

== History ==
The stadium was built 1933, and was called "Metalurh". However at times the stadium was called different names such as "Playground Palace of Culture" and "Stal Stadium".

== Reconstruction ==
In 2003, the stadium was reconstructed. Heating was installed so that the pitch would not freeze. Also were installed new plastic seats, an irrigation system and an electronic scoreboard.
