= Viktor Maslov (footballer, born 1949) =

Ukrainian footballer and referee (born 1949)

Personal information
- Full name: Viktor Borysovych Maslov
- Date of birth: 31 March 1949 (age 77)
- Place of birth: Petropavlovsk-Kamchatsky, Khabarovsk Krai, Russian SFSR
- Height: 1.79 m (5 ft 10 in)
- Position: Midfielder

Senior career*
Years	Team	Apps	(Gls)
1966–1969	Silbud Poltava	63	(8)
1969–1973	FC Chornomorets Odesa	99	(9)
1973	FC Dnipro Dnipropetrovsk	22	(2)
1974	FC Dynamo Kyiv	16	(0)
1975–1978	FC Dnipro Dnipropetrovsk	72	(5)
1978–1979	FC Kolos Nikopol	21	(1)

Managerial career
- 1986–1990: FC Dnipro Dnipropetrovsk (administrator)
- 1991: FC Dnipro Dnipropetrovsk (nachalnik komandy)
- 1992: FC Temp Shepetivka (assistant)
- 1993: FC Tavria Kherson
- 1993: FC Vorskla Poltava
- 1994: FC Torpedo Zaporizhia
- 1999–2005: Dnipromain sports school Dnipropetrovsk (director)
- 2002: FC Dnipro-2 Dnipropetrovsk
- 2005–2006: FC Stal Dniprodzerzhynsk
- 2006–2010: FC Stal Dniprodzerzhynsk (sports director)
- 2007–2008: FC Stal Dniprodzerzhynsk
- 2010–2012: FC Stal Dniprodzerzhynsk
- * Club domestic league appearances and goals

Viktor Borysovych Maslov (Ukrainian: Віктор Борисович Маслов, born 31 March 1949 in Petropavlovsk-Kamchatskiy, Kamchatka Oblast) is a former Ukrainian footballer and football referee.
