= Kostyantyn Vizyonok =

Ukrainian footballer

Kostyantyn Vizyonok Костянтин Петрович Візьонок
Personal information
- Full name: Kostyantyn Petrovych Vizyonok
- Date of birth: 27 March 1976 (age 50)
- Place of birth: Armyansk, Ukrainian SSR
- Height: 1.77 m (5 ft 9 1/2 in)
- Position: Forward

Youth career
- UOR Simferopol

Senior career*
Years	Team	Apps	(Gls)
1992–1997	FC Tytan Armyansk	62	(22)
1997	FC Sportakademklub Moscow	7	(1)
1998	FC Baltika Kaliningrad	16	(1)
1998–1999	FC Tytan Armyansk	11	(3)
1999–2000	Maccabi Ironi Kiryat Ata F.C.		(1)
2000–2002	Hapoel Ironi Rishon leZion	48	(11)
2003	FC Helios Kharkiv		
2004	FC Tytan Armyansk	7	(0)
2005–2006	FC Stal Dniprodzerzhynsk	60	(27)
2007–2008	FC Helios Kharkiv	41	(9)
2009	FC Komunalnyk Luhansk		
2009–2012	FC Tytan Armyansk	78	(27)
- * Club domestic league appearances and goals

Kostyantyn Petrovych Vizyonok (Ukrainian: Костянтин Петрович Візьонок; born 27 March 1976) is a former Ukrainian football player.

He scored 3 goals for FC Baltika Kaliningrad in the 1998 UEFA Intertoto Cup, helping them to advance to the third round on the only occasion Baltika participated in the European competition.
