= Michael Chidi Alozie =

Nigerian footballer (born 1986)

Chidi Alozi
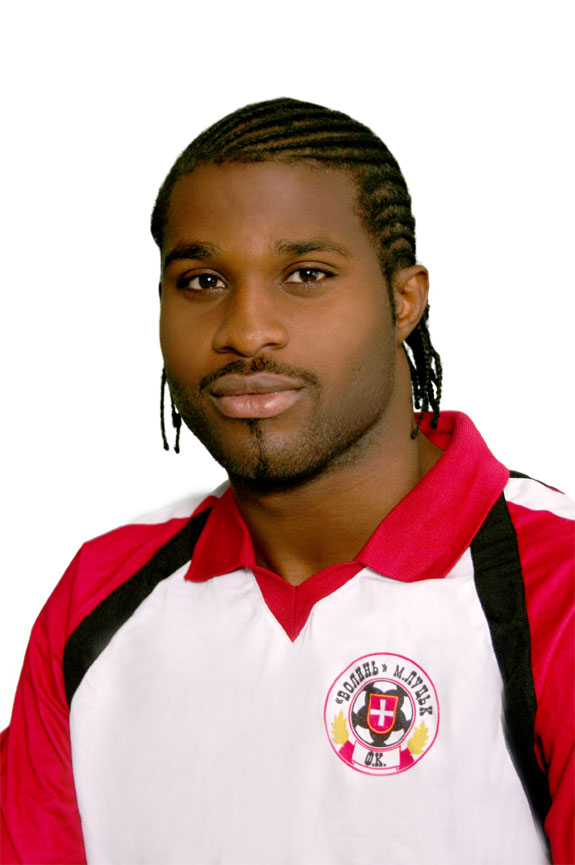
- Chidi Alozi in FC Volyn Lutsk colours

Personal information
- Full name: Michael Chidi Alozie
- Date of birth: October 16, 1986 (age 40)
- Place of birth: Lagos, Nigeria
- Height: 1.85 m (6 ft 1 in)
- Position: Striker

Youth career
- Swift Eagles

Senior career*
Years	Team	Apps	(Gls)
2003	Swift Eagles		
2004	Beroe Stara Zagora	5	(3)
2005–2008	Volyn Lutsk	93	(31)
2008–2010	Metalurh Zaporizhzhia	56	(10)
2011–2014	Sevastopol	25	(1)
2015	Sereď	1	(0)
- * Club domestic league appearances and goals

Michael Chidi Alozie (born 16 October 1986) is a Nigerian professional footballer who last played for Sereď.

== Career ==
The striker began his career with Swift Eagles in his native Nigeria and signed than in February 2004 for Beroe Stara Zagora in Bulgaria.

=== Ukraine ===
Chidi Alozie spent almost 10 years in Ukraine. He was signed by FC Metalurh Zaporizhya of the Ukrainian Premier League, played previously successful three-years with Volyn Lutsk. On 29 January 2011 left FC Metalurh Zaporizhya and signed with PFK Sevastopol. In 2014 left PFK Sevastopol.

=== Slovakia ===
In 2015 Alozie signed with Slovak ŠKF Sereď.

== International career ==
On 29 December 2007 Alozie was called up to the Nigeria national football team, but never played a single game.
