= Pavlo Onysko =

Ukrainian footballer (born 1979)

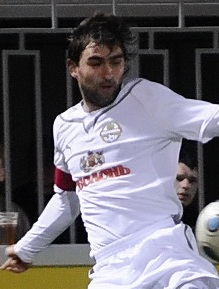

Personal information
- Full name: Pavlo Stepanovych Onysko
- Date of birth: 12 July 1979 (age 47)
- Place of birth: Lviv, Ukrainian SSR, Soviet Union
- Height: 1.83 m (6 ft 0 in)
- Position: Forward

Youth career
- Karpaty Lviv

Senior career*
Years	Team	Apps	(Gls)
1997–2002	Karpaty Lviv	16	(0)
1997–2002	→ Karpaty-2 Lviv	95	(43)
2001	→ Lviv (loan)	14	(4)
2002	→ Karpaty-3 Lviv	3	(0)
2002	→ Obolon Kyiv (loan)	1	(0)
2002	→ Obolon-2 Kyiv (loan)	1	(0)
2003	Illichivets Mariupol	11	(0)
2003	→ Illichivets-2 Mariupol	4	(2)
2004–2005	Hazovyk-Skala Stryi	40	(20)
2004	→ Vorskla Poltava (loan)	6	(0)
2004	→ Vorskla-2 Poltava (loan)	4	(3)
2006	Krymteplytsia Molodizhne	35	(17)
2007–2010	Obolon Kyiv	85	(37)
2010	Prykarpattya Ivano-Frankivsk	12	(5)
2011	Nyva Ternopil	12	(3)
2012	Lviv	8	(0)
- * Club domestic league appearances and goals

Pavlo Onysko (Ukrainian: Павло Степанович Онисько; born 12 July 1979) is a Ukrainian former professional football player.

Onysko became a professional football player with FC Karpaty Lviv, and after going on loan to FC Obolon Kyiv to seek more first team football, he was acquired by Illichivets in early 2003. He played sparingly for Illichivets' first team and suffered a long-term injury which led the club to release him in early 2004.
