= FC Enerhetyk Burshtyn =

Enerhetyk
- Full name: FC Enerhetyk Burshtyn
- Founded: 1948
- Dissolved: 2012 (withdrew to regional competitions); 2019 (merged with Karpaty Halych)
- Ground: Enerhetyk Stadium
- Capacity: 4000
- Chairman: Myroslav Lototskyi
- Head Coach: Volodymyr Kovalyuk
- League: Ukrainian First League
- 2010–11: 16th
Home colours	Away colours

FC Enerhetyk Burshtyn was a professional Ukrainian football club based in Burshtyn, Ivano-Frankivsk Oblast.

== History ==
The club was formed in 1948 and was previously called Kolhospnyk (Collective] farmer), Avanhard (Vanguard) and Henerator (Generator).

The club played in the Ivano-Frankivs'k oblast league and in the 1990s and after steadily improving they won the Oblast Championship in 1998. They also entered the Ukrainian Amateur Championships and were undefeated champions in that season. The club was granted entry into the Ukrainian Professional Leagues in the next season (1998–99) in the Ukrainian Second League.

They competed in the Ukrainian First League struggling most of the time. With 2 games to play in the 2011–12 Ukrainian First League season the club president announced that due to insufficient funds the club would withdraw from the PFL.

They had a farm-club FC Enerhetyk-Halychyna-2 Halych which plays in Ivano-Frankivsk Oblast championship.

The colors of the team were red and black.

== Honors ==
- Ukrainian Druha Liha:

Runners Up: 2

2002/03 Group A
2004/05 Group A

== Coaches ==
- (Ukraine) Mykola Prystay (2002–03), (2005–08), (2009–10)
- (Ukraine) Mykhaylo Savka (2008–09), (2010)
- (Ukraine) Roman Pokora (2010)
- (Ukraine) Serhiy Ptashnyk (2010–2011)
- (Ukraine) Bohdan Blavatskyi (2011)
- (Ukraine) Mykola Vitovskyi (caretaker) (2011–2012)
- (Ukraine) Volodymyr Kovalyuk (2012)

== League and cup history ==
Season	Div.	Pos.	Pl.	W	D	L	GS	GA	P	Domestic Cup	Europe	Notes
1990	4th (Group 2)	13	30	7	7	16	27	42	21	–		
1991	4th (Group 2)	11	28	9	3	16	34	45	21	–		
1997–98	4th	1	8	6	2	0	10	3	20	Ukrainian Amateur Cup		
1997–98	4th	1	4	4	0	0	8	1	12	1/2 finals		
1998–99	3rd "A"	11	28	9	7	12	23	30	34	Ukrainian Cup		
1998–99	3rd "A"	11	28	9	7	12	23	30	34	Did not enter		
1999–00	3rd "A"	3	30	16	5	9	38	27	53	1/16 finals Second League Cup		
2000–01	3rd "A"	9	30	11	8	11	34	34	41	1/4 finals Second League Cup		
2001–02	3rd "A"	12	36	11	8	17	49	54	41	3rd round		
2002–03	3rd "A"	2	28	19	2	7	44	23	59	1/32 finals		
2003–04	3rd "A"	5	30	14	7	9	41	28	46	1/32 finals		
2004–05	3rd "A"	2	28	15	6	7	43	29	51	1/32 finals		Promoted
2005–06	2nd	14	34	8	12	14	31	44	36	1/32 finals		
2006–07	2nd	15	36	10	9	17	31	46	39	1/16 finals		
2007–08	2nd	13	38	13	9	16	39	44	48	1/16 finals		
2008–09	2nd	14	32	8	7	17	29	43	31	1/32 finals		
2009–10	2nd	15	34	8	11	15	32	49	35	1/16 finals		
2010–11	2nd	16	34	10	6	18	29	49	36	1/32 finals		
2011–12	2nd	18	34	5	4	25	26	72	19	1/16 finals		withdrew

== See also ==
- Burshtyn TES
- FC Karpaty Halych
