= FC Khimik Krasnoperekopsk =

- Full name: Futbol′nyy klub Khimik Krasnoperekopsk
- Founded: 1951
- Dissolved: 2012
- Ground: "Khimik", Krasnoperekopsk
- League: Championship of AR Crimea
- 2012: 2nd (withdrew)

FC Khimik Krasnoperekopsk was an amateur Ukrainian football club based in Krasnoperekopsk, Crimea. The club was founded in 1951. They competed in the Ukrainian Second League for 3 seasons. After the 2007–08 season the club didn't submit a license and elected to remove themselves from the PFL.

== League and cup history (Ukraine) ==
Season	Div.	Pos.	Pl.	W	D	L	GS	GA	P	Domestic Cup	Europe	Notes
2002	5th Crimean Championship	6_{/18}	34	19	6	9	63	50	63			
2003	5th Crimean Championship	7_{/15}	28	12	2	14	35	43	51			
2004	5th Crimean Championship	1_{/15}	28	25	1	2	78	14	76			Admitted to Amateur League
2004	4th Amateur League Gr. E	4_{/4}	4	1	1	2	2	3	4			
2005	5th Crimean Championship	7_{/14}	26	11	4	11	46	62	37			Admitted
2005–06	3rd Second League Gr. B	6_{/15}	28	11	5	12	24	30	38	1/16 finals		
2006–07	3rd Second League Gr. B	5_{/15}	28	13	7	8	35	28	46	1/16 finals		
2007–08	3rd Second League Gr. B	4_{/18}	34	21	6	7	54	28	69	1/64 finals		Withdrew
2008	5th Crimean Championship	7_{/13}	11	8	3	1	37	15	27			
2009	5th Crimean Championship	3_{/12}	21	14	1	6	68	24	43			
2010	5th Crimean Championship	1_{/12}	22	17	4	1	73	21	55			
2011	5th Crimean Championship	7_{/13}	22	10	4	8	38	27	34			
2012	5th Crimean Championship	2_{/12}	22	16	4	2	75	21	52			Withdrew

== Honours ==
- Crimea championship (Ukrainian Lower League Tier)

2004, 2010
