= Ukrainian Third League =

- Founded: 1992
- Folded: 1995
- Country: Ukraine
- Number of clubs: 22 (last season)
- Level on pyramid: 4
- Promotion to: Ukrainian Second League
- Relegation to: KFK competitions
- Domestic cup: Ukrainian Cup
- Most championships: 1 – Naftokhimik Kremenchuk, Sirius Zhovti Vody, CSKA Kyiv
- Website: Official site

The Ukrainian Third League (Ukrainian: Третя ліга, Tretia Liha), until 1994 known as the Transitional League (Ukrainian: Перехідна ліга), was part of the Ukrainian semi-professional football clubs competitions. In 1994, it was renamed as Third League and granted the status of professionals, but during a winter break of 1995 it was decided to discontinue it and merge back with the Ukrainian Second League.

== History ==
The League as the fourth tier (or third smaller tier) was created after the reorganization once the first championship was completed in 1993. In 1992, original Transitional League was created, which later was transformed into the Ukrainian Second League. The league was created from the pool of clubs of the third tier that did not perform well in the previous season as well as the best new amateur clubs that had won their respective regional competitions.

Throughout its history the League yielded at least four promotions each year. That in turn fueled the rise of the Ukrainian new football clubs, FC Arsenal Kyiv and FC Metalurh Donetsk. At the end of the 1995 season, the League was incorporated back into the Second League and the teams of both Leagues were then split into two groups.

Each season the league was admitting about 10 new clubs from the KFK competitions (8 in 1993, 10 in 1994, and 12 in 1995).

In 1992–93 Ukrainian Transitional League took place several strange nuances. The third placed team withdrew after being granted promotion, the fourth place which in mid-season was forcefully merged with another entity gave away its promotion in favor of the newly acquired entity, another club which was excluded from competitions due to sportsmanship conduct sanctions was reinstated for the next season, out of the last six team, the third from the bottom of the season's standing table was allowed to stay for the next season.

== Third League winners ==
| Season | Champion | Runner-up | Third place |
|---|---|---|---|
| 1992–93 (Note: The fourth and fifth teams in the competition, Nyva-Borysfen Myronivka and Voikovets Kerch, were promoted as well to the 1993–94 Ukrainian Second League.) | Naftokhimik Kremenchuk | Dynamo Luhansk | Antratsyt Kirovske |
| 1993–94 (Note: The 4th team in the competition, FC Lviv, was also promoted to the 1994–95 Ukrainian Second League.) | Sirius Zhovti Vody | Frunzenets Saky | Viktor Zaporizhzhia |
| 1994–95 (Note: All teams from league were promoted to the 1995–96 Ukrainian Second League after merging of two leagues.) | CSKA Kyiv | Nyva Myronivka | Khutrovyk Tysmenytsia |

=== All-time table ===
Top-20. All names are shown as at the time of the last participation.

| 2020–21 Ukrainian Premier League |
| 2020–21 Ukrainian First League |
| 2020–21 Ukrainian Second League |
| 2020–21 Ukrainian Football Amateur League |
| 2020 Regional competitions |
| Club is defunct |

| PL | Team | Seasons | GP | W | D | L | GS | GA | Pts | Achievement | Prom | First | Last |
|---|---|---|---|---|---|---|---|---|---|---|---|---|---|
| 1 | Torpedo Melitopol | 3 | 110 | 48 | 29 | 33 | 125 | 106 | 173 | 4th | 1 | 1992–93 | 1994–95 |
| 2 | CSKA Kyiv | 2 | 76 | 46 | 9 | 21 | 126 | 70 | 147 | champion | 1 | 1993–94 | 1994–95 |
| 3 | Nyva-Kosmos Myronivka | 3 | 76 | 43 | 18 | 15 | 99 | 43 | 147 | vice-champion | 2 | 1992–93 | 1994–95 |
| 4 | Avanhard Zhydachiv | 3 | 110 | 39 | 28 | 43 | 121 | 141 | 145 | 8th | 1 | 1992–93 | 1994–95 |
| 5 | Khutrovyk Tysmenytsia | 2 | 76 | 42 | 15 | 19 | 116 | 67 | 141 | third place | 1 | 1993–94 | 1994–95 |
| 6 | Systema-Boreks Borodianka | 2 | 76 | 41 | 17 | 18 | 113 | 47 | 140 | 5th | 1 | 1993–94 | 1994–95 |
| 7 | Oskil Kupiansk | 2 | 76 | 40 | 11 | 25 | 102 | 84 | 131 | 5th | 1 | 1993–94 | 1994–95 |
| 8 | Frunzenets Saky | 2 | 68 | 34 | 17 | 17 | 99 | 57 | 119 | vice-champion | 1 | 1992–93 | 1993–94 |
| 9 | Fetrovyk Khust | 3 | 107 | 32 | 10 | 65 | 80 | 119 | 106 | 12th | – | 1992–93 | 1994–95 |
| 10 | Promin Sambir | 2 | 68 | 26 | 8 | 34 | 78 | 91 | 86 | 10th | – | 1992–93 | 1993–94 |
| 11 | Avanhard Rovenky | 1 | 42 | 23 | 4 | 15 | 59 | 50 | 73 | 7th | 1 | 1994–95 | 1994–95 |
| 12 | Naftokhimik Kremenchuk | 1 | 34 | 21 | 10 | 3 | 56 | 26 | 73 | champion | 1 | 1992–93 | 1992–93 |
| 13 | Antratsyt Kirovske | 1 | 34 | 22 | 5 | 7 | 46 | 32 | 71 | third place | 1 | 1992–93 | 1992–93 |
| 14 | Sirius Zhovti Vody | 1 | 34 | 20 | 11 | 3 | 56 | 25 | 71 | champion | 1 | 1993–94 | 1993–94 |
| 15 | Shakhtar Horlivka | 2 | 76 | 20 | 11 | 45 | 62 | 117 | 71 | 13th | – | 1992–93 | 1994–95 |
| 16 | Silur Khartsyzk | 2 | 68 | 18 | 16 | 34 | 57 | 105 | 70 | 13th | – | 1992–93 | 1993–94 |
| 17 | Dynamo Luhansk | 1 | 34 | 19 | 12 | 3 | 66 | 32 | 69 | vice-champion | 1 | 1992–93 | 1992–93 |
| 18 | Viktor Zaporizhzhia | 1 | 34 | 20 | 8 | 6 | 65 | 25 | 68 | third place | 1 | 1993–94 | 1993–94 |
| 19 | FC Lviv | 1 | 34 | 20 | 8 | 6 | 57 | 33 | 68 | 4th | 1 | 1993–94 | 1993–94 |
| 20 | Metalurh Novomoskovsk | 1 | 42 | 21 | 2 | 19 | 59 | 60 | 65 | 8th | 1 | 1994–95 | 1994–95 |

== Participated teams by regions ==
In bold are teams that played at least 10 seasons. In brackets is a number of seasons.

| Region | Teams |
|---|---|
| Crimea | Frunzenets Saky (1992/93, 1993/94 {2}), More Feodosia (1992/93 {1}), Voikovets Kerch (1992/93 {1}), Surozh Sudak (1993/94 {1}) |
| Cherkasy Oblast | |
| Chernihiv Oblast | |
| Chernivtsi Oblast | Lada Chernivtsi (1994/95 {1}) |
| Dnipropetrovsk Oblast | Prometei Dniprodzerzhynsk (1992/93 {1}), Sirius Zhovti Vody (1993/94 {1}), Metalurh Novomoskovsk (1994/95 {1}) |
| Donetsk Oblast | Silur Khartsyzk (1992/93, 1993/94 {2}), Shakhtar Horlivka (1992/93, 1994/95 {2}), Antratsyt Kirovske (1992/93 {1}), Prometei Shakhtarsk (1992/93 {1}) |
| Ivano-Frankivsk Oblast | Khutrovyk Tysmenytsia (1993/94, 1994/95 {2}), Beskyd Nadvirna (1993/94 {1}) |
| Kharkiv Oblast | Olimpik Kharkiv (1992/93 {1}), Oskil Kupiansk (1993/94, 1994/95 {2}) |
| Kherson Oblast | Tavriya Novotroitske (1994/95 {1}) |
| Khmelnytskyi Oblast | Advis Khmelnytskyi (1994/95 {1}) |
| Kyiv City | CSKA (ZSU) (1993/94, 1994/95 {2}) |
| Kyiv Oblast | Nyva(-Borysfen) Myronivka (1992/93 – 1994/95 {3}), Systema-Boreks (Hart) Borodianka (1993/94, 1994/95 {2}), Skhid Slavutych (1994/95 {1}) |
| Kirovohrad Oblast | |
| Lviv Oblast | Promin Volia Baranetska (1992/93, 1993/94 {2}), Avanhard Zhydachiv (1992/93 – 1994/95 {3}), FC Lviv (1993/94 {1}), Medyk Morshyn (1993/94 {1}), Skify-LAZ Lviv (1994/95 {1}) |
| Luhansk Oblast | Dynamo Luhansk (1992/93 {1}), Avanhard-Industriya Rovenky (1994/95 {1}), FC Shakhtar Stakhanov (1994/95 {1}) |
| Mykolaiv Oblast | |
| Odesa Oblast | Dnistrovets Bilhorod-Dnistrovskyi (1994/95 {1}) |
| Poltava Oblast | Naftokhimik Kremenchuk (1992/93 {1}), Vahonobudivnyk Kremenchuk (1994/95 {1}), Sula Lubny (1994/95 {1}) |
| Rivne Oblast | |
| Sumy Oblast | Elektron Romny (1992/93, 1993/94 {2}) |
| Ternopil Oblast | Lysonia Berezhany (1992/93 {1}), Dnister Zalishchyky (1994/95 {1}) |
| Vinnytsia Oblast | |
| Volyn Oblast | |
| Zakarpattia Oblast | Fetrovyk Khust (1992/93 – 1994/95 {3}) |
| Zaporizhzhia Oblast | Torpedo Melitopol (1992/93 – 1994/95 {3}), Viktor Zaporizhia (1993/94 {1}) |
| Zhytomyr Oblast | Keramik Baranivka (1994/95 {1}) |
