= Ukrainian football league system =

- Country: Ukraine
- Sport: Association football
- Promotion and relegation: Yes

National system
- Federation: Football Association
- Confederation: UEFA
- Top division: Premier Liha (men); Vyshcha Liha (women)
- Second division: Persha Liha (men); Persha Liha (women)
- Cup competition: Men: Ukrainian Cup; Ukrainian Super Cup; Women: Ukrainian Women's Cup

The Ukrainian football league system has developed over the years.

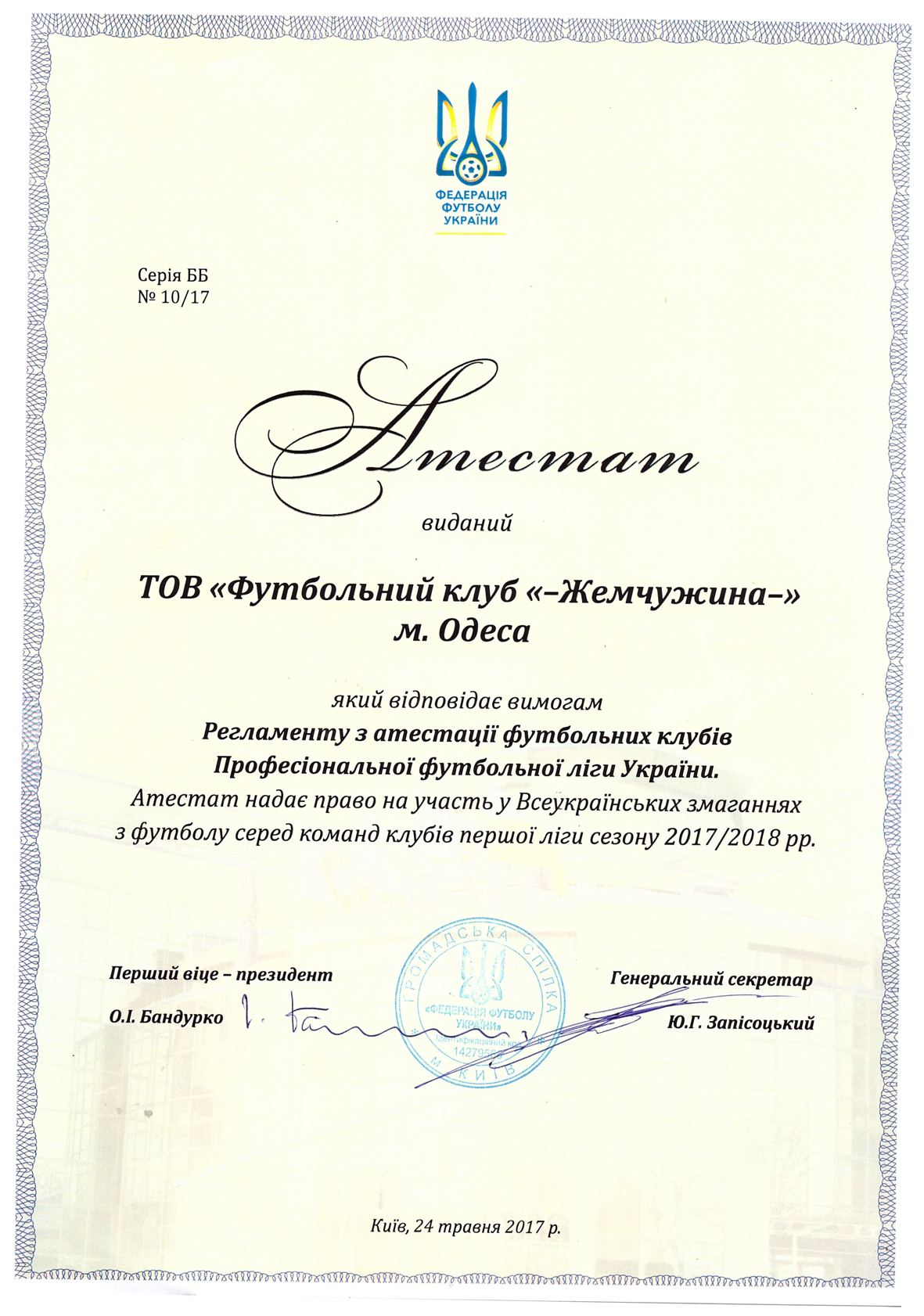
The Ukrainian Association of Football Certificate of Attestation for a club in 2017

Since the fall of the Soviet Union, all professional clubs from Ukraine have joined their own national football competitions as the Soviet competitions transitioned to Russian. The amateur-level clubs/teams always played in Ukrainian republican competitions. The top two tiers traditionally have a single group with a double round-robin system. The third tier, while having the same type of competition organization, usually has two groups organized geographically. The depth of the national league competitions is about four levels. Regional competitions in oblasts and the autonomous republic usually have one or two tiers, while selected regions have had up to five tiers sometimes.

Parallel to the senior team, there are also junior team competitions, a separate student league, female competitions, and other types of football (indoor, beach, others). Female association football, which was struggling after the fall of the Soviet Union, has shaped into a more stable competition with its own two-tier league competition and junior team tournament.

The promotion and relegation as a rotational process of clubs' exchange between tiers is not set completely and may vary from season to season. The promotion and relegation process exists among the top three tiers (Premier, Persha, and Druha leagues). The exchange between the third and the fourth tiers is carried out in the form of clubs' evaluations on their stability and relative sustainability, including financial, administrative, commercial, and communal development, among others. Below the fourth tier, the promotion and relegation process is completely void, and clubs sometimes participate in competitions of their regional federations along with the AAFU competitions (the fourth tier).

== League system (senior teams, male) ==
Note: In the column P/R, the numbers in parentheses indicate teams that qualify for promotion/relegation through inter-league play-offs.

Level	League(s)/Division(s)		P/R
1	Ukrainian Premier League; Premier Liha; 16 teams		▼2 (2)
2	Ukrainian First League; Persha Liha; 16 teams		▲2 (2) ▼3 (2)
3	Ukrainian Second League; Druha Liha; Number of teams changes every season		▲1 (2)
4	Ukrainian Amateur League (before 1998 – KFK competitions); Amatorska Liha; 35 teams		
5	Regional championships (first level); ~25 leagues		
6	Regional championships (second level); ~20 leagues	District (city) championships (first level); Multiple leagues	
7	Regional championships (third level); ~5 leagues	District (city) championships (second level); Multiple leagues	
8	Regional championships (fourth level); ~5 leagues	District (city) championships (third level); Multiple leagues	

Ukrainian Premier League (UPL)
Professional Football League (PFL)
Ukrainian Football Amateur Association (AAFU)
Regional competitions

=== Evolution of the Ukrainian football league system ===
Tier\Years	1992	1992–1993	1993–1994	1994–1995	1995–1997	1997–2008	2008–present
1	Vyshcha Liha				Vyshcha Liha		Premier Liha
2	Persha Liha				Persha Liha		
3	Perekhidna Liha	Druha Liha			Druha Liha		
3 (lower)	Perekhidna Liha	Perekhidna Liha		Tretia Liha	Druha Liha		
4	no competitions	KFK	Amatorska Liha			Amatorska Liha	
5+	Regional championships						

Soviet Union period

Tier\Years	1963–1969		1970		1971–1989	1990–1991
1	Class A	Pervaya Gruppa (selected clubs)	Class A	Vysshaya Gruppa (selected clubs)	Vysshaya Liga (selected clubs)	
2	Class A	Vtoraya Gruppa (selected clubs)	Class A	Pervaya Gruppa (selected clubs)	Pervaya Liga (selected clubs)	
3	Class B (Ukrainian Group)		Class A	Vtoraya Gruppa (Ukrainian Group)	Vtoraya Liga (Ukrainian Group)	Vtoraya Liga (selected club, Group West)
3 (lower)	Class B (Ukrainian Group)		Class B (Ukrainian Group)		Vtoraya Liga (Ukrainian Group)	Vtoraya Nizshaya Liga (Group 1)
4	KFK					
5+	Regional championships					

== League system (senior teams, female) ==
Unlike male club sport that has multiple organizations, female football is administered by a one "All-Ukrainian Association of Women Football" that until 2012 did not have full membership within the Ukrainian Association of Football (at that time FFU). Only the Higher League has a status of professional.

Level	League(s)/Division(s)	P/R
1	Higher League; Vyshcha Liha; 12 teams	
2	First League; Persha Liha multiple groups	
3	Regional championships (first level)	

== League system (youth teams) ==
The league system is more based on age. All for levels are national leagues. Regional leagues organize own youth competitions along with adults. In independent Ukraine the first youth competition were established in 1998 and had two categories senior and junior.

In 2001 those competitions were transformed into the FFU Youth League which conducts competitions in four categories based on age. The league also has two divisions for each category between each takes place rotation of teams. Following that, in 2002 there were established youth competitions of the Professional Football League of Ukraine which were conducted among players under 19 of age.

=== Lads (boys) ===
Age	League(s)/Division(s)	
U-21	UPL U-21 Championship / Reserve championship 12 teams	
U-19	UPL U-19 Championship; 14 teams	PFL U-19 Championship; 24 teams
U-17	Youth Football League; Multiple groups, 100+ teams	
U-16	Youth Football League; Multiple groups, 100+ teams	
U-15	Youth Football League; Multiple groups, 100+ teams	
U-14	Youth Football League; Multiple groups, 100+ teams	
U-13	Leather Ball Cup (unisex competitions); Shkiryanyi myach	

=== Gals (girls) ===
Age	League(s)/Division(s)
U-17	Youth competitions Multiple groups
U-16	Youth competitions Multiple groups
U-15	Youth competitions Multiple groups
U-14	Youth competitions Multiple groups
U-13	Leather Ball Cup (unisex competitions); Shkiryanyi myach

== Organization ==
=== National competitions ===
==== Professional status ====
The first three levels of the football League system in Ukraine are the professional level competitions, the rest are the amateur and sometimes inconsistent. The first four levels are the national type competitions and divided among three independent football organizations:

- Premier League of Ukraine regulates Ukrainian Premier League and its Under-21 and Under-19 League;
- Professional Football League of Ukraine regulates the First League and the Second League;

==== Amateur status ====
- Ukrainian Football Amateur Association regulates the Amateur Championships and Amateur Cup.

There is also national youth competition that consists of the youth teams from all of the professional clubs as well as some of the amateurs and schools of Olympic Reserve. The competitions are divided among several age group of participants between ages of 14 and 17. Each professional club is obliged to be represented with at least one team in those competitions.

=== Regional ===
The regional competitions are considered amateur and primarily organized by the football organizations of their respective regions. For some period there existed the FFU Council of Regions that was providing some degree of uniformity between the competitions of different regions and answering to the executive committee of FFU. There are 27 members of the council including representatives from the cities of Kyiv and Sevastopol. Similar to the national, each regional organization also have a leagues system, but usually do not exceed two levels. There are also cup competitions of each region. The regional youth competitions are organized consequently with the senior competitions and each round of those takes place usually a day prior. Each regional football association has the right upon conclusion of a season recommends the best club or clubs of their choice to the Ukrainian Football Amateur Association.

=== Student ===
There also is the Student Football League, which is less notable and it is NOT a part of the league system. The players of the league represent Ukraine in Universiadas as a national team. There were some discussions to spread a similar type of competition through Europe. The national student team sometimes is composed of professional-level players and can be considered as a type of B-team.

== Number of professional clubs ==
With asterisk (*) identified leagues which in certain season carried transitional (semi-professional) status.

Season \ Tier	Premier League (Tier 1)	First League (Tier 2)	Second League (Tier 3)	Third League (Tier 4)	Total
1992	20	28	18*	–	66
1992–93	16	22	18	18*	74
1993–94	18	20	22	18*	78
1994–95	18	22	22	22	84
1995–96	18	22	43	–	83
1996–97	16	24	33	–	73
1997–98	16	22	51	–	89
1998–99	16	20	46	–	82
1999–00	16	18	44	–	78
2000–01	14	18	48	–	80
2001–02	14	18	55	–	87
2002–03	16	18	46	–	80
2003–04	16	18	48	–	82
2004–05	16	18	44	–	78
2005–06	16	18	43	–	77
2006–07	16	20	30	–	66
2007–08	16	20	34	–	70
2008–09	16	18	36	–	70
2009–10	16	18	26	–	60
2010–11	16	18	24	–	58
2011–12	16	18	28	–	62
2012–13	16	18	24	–	58
2013–14	16	16	19	–	51
2014–15	14	16	10	–	40
2015–16	14	16	14	–	44
2016–17	12	18	17	–	47
2017–18	12	18	23	–	53
2018–19	12	16	20	–	48
2019–20	12	16	22	–	50
2020–21	14	16	27	–	57
2021–22	16	16	31	–	63
2022–23	16	16	10	–	42
2023–24	16	20	15	–	51
2024–25	16	18	20	–	54
2025–26	16	16	22	–	54
2026–27	16	16	18	–	50
