= 1987 Football Cup of Ukrainian SSR among KFK =

1987 Ukrainian Amateur Cup
Tournament details
- Country: Soviet Union (Ukrainian SSR)
- Teams: 9

Final positions
- Champions: FC Pivdenstal Yenakiive
- Runners-up: FC Avanhard Drohobych

Tournament statistics
- Matches played: 17
- Goals scored: 48 (2.82 per match)

The 1987 Football Cup of Ukrainian SSR among KFK was the annual season of Ukraine's football knockout competition for amateur football teams.

== Competition schedule ==
=== First qualification round ===
Avanhard Drohobych	+/-	Lehmash Chernivtsi
Avtomobilist Sumy	1–2	Avanhard Lozova

=== Second qualification round ===
Team 1	Score	Team 2
FC Mashynobudivnyk Borodianka	0–0 (4–3 p)	FC Tsukrovyk Chortkiv
FC Keramik Vynohradiv	2–3	FC Bystrytsia Nadvirna
FC Avanhard Drohobych	0–0 (4–3 p)	FC Korchahinets Shepetivka
FC Zirka Mykolaiv	2–1	FC Temp Cherkasy
FC Stakhanovets Stakhanov	1–3	FC Pivdenstal Yenakiieve
FC Transformator Zaporizhia	4–3	FC ZOR Odesa
FC Bilshovyk Kyiv	1–0	FC Prohres Nizhyn
FC Avanhard Lozova	1–0	FC Sula Lubny

=== Quarterfinals (1/4) ===
Team 1	Score	Team 2
FC Avanhard Drohobych	3–1	FC Bystrytsia Nadvirna
FC Pivdenstal Yenakiieve	2–1	FC Transformator Zaporizhia
FC Bilshovyk Kyiv	2–1	FC Mashynobudivnyk Borodianka
FC Avanhard Lozova	2–2 (4–2 p)	FC Korchahinets Shepetivka

=== Semifinals (1/2) ===
Team 1	Score	Team 2
FC Avanhard Drohobych	2–1	FC Bilshovyk Kyiv
FC Avanhard Lozova	1–3	FC Pivdenstal Yenakiieve

=== Final ===
Team 1	Agg.	Team 2	1st leg	2nd leg
FC Pivdenstal Yenakiieve	3–2	FC Avanhard Drohobych	0–2	3–0 (a.e.t.)

== See also ==
- 1987 KFK competitions (Ukraine)
