= 1992–93 Ukrainian Football Amateur League =

Competitions of KFK
- Season: 1992-1993
- Teams: 82 (27/27 federations)
- Champions: None (6 group winners): Beskyd Nadvirna (Group 1); Khutrovyk Tysmenytsia (Group 2); Hart Borodianka (Group 3); Sirius Zhovti Vody (Group 4); Oskil Kupiansk (Group 5); Surozh Sudak (Group 6)
- Relegated: unknown (multiple withdrawals)
- Top goalscorer: Serhiy Akymenko (FC Shakhtar Snizhne) 23

The 1992–93 Football championship of Ukraine among amateurs was the first season of the nationwide amateur competitions in the independent Ukraine and was known as the football competitions of fitness collectives or KFK for short. The tournament was conducted under auspices of the Football Federation of Ukraine before creation of the Ukrainian Football Amateur Association.

Unlike the professional football competitions that started in late February 1992 changing to fall-spring calendar, the amateur competitions started somewhat late due to the same shift in competitions. Beside that factor the format, provided by the Football Federation of Ukrainian SSR, was left unchanged leaving all six groups that were divided by regional principal. There competed total of 82 teams representing all 27 regional football federations.

All group winners (six of them) were allowed to enter the transitional league next season.

== Teams ==
=== Location map ===
Locations of team home grounds in the 1992-93 Ukrainian Championship among amateur teams

=== Composition ===
Group 1		Group 2		Group 3	
Region	Teams	Region	Teams	Region	Teams
Volyn Oblast (3)	Silmash Kovel	Ivano-Frankivsk Oblast (1)	Khutrovyk Tysmenytsia	Zhytomyr Oblast (1)	Keramik Baranivka
Volyn Oblast (3)	Shakhta 9 Novovolynsk	Rivne Oblast (1)	Lokomotyv Rivne	Kyiv (2)	Dynamo-3 Kyiv
Volyn Oblast (3)	Pidshypnyk Lutsk	Ternopil Oblast (3)	Start Kozova	Kyiv (2)	Kray Kyiv
Lviv Oblast (3)	Shakhtar Chervonohrad	Ternopil Oblast (3)	Zoria Khorostkiv	Kyiv Oblast (2)	Budivelnyk Ivankiv
Lviv Oblast (3)	Sokil Lviv	Ternopil Oblast (3)	Medobory Husiatyn	Kyiv Oblast (2)	Hart Borodianka
Lviv Oblast (3)	Hirnyk Novoyavorivsk	Khmelnytskyi Oblast (3)	Iskra Teofipol	Cherkasy Oblast (2)	Rotor Cherkasy
Zakarpattia Oblast (2)	Aval Dovhe	Khmelnytskyi Oblast (3)	Sluch Krasyliv	Cherkasy Oblast (2)	Spartak Zolotonosha
Zakarpattia Oblast (2)	Yalynka Velykyi Bychkiv	Khmelnytskyi Oblast (3)	Advis Khmelnytskyi	Chernihiv Oblast (3)	Tekstylnyk Chernihiv
Ivano-Frankivsk Oblast (4)	Khimik Kalush	Zhytomyr Oblast (2)	Fortuna Andrushivka	Chernihiv Oblast (3)	Ahroservis Bakhmach
Ivano-Frankivsk Oblast (4)	Halychyna Broshniv	Zhytomyr Oblast (2)	Shkirianyk Berdychiv	Chernihiv Oblast (3)	Naftovyk Varva
Ivano-Frankivsk Oblast (4)	Beskid Nadvirna	Vinnytsia Oblast (3)	Intehral Vinnytsia	Sumy Oblast (4)	Esman Hlukhiv
Ivano-Frankivsk Oblast (4)	Pokuttia Kolomyia	Vinnytsia Oblast (3)	Hranyt Sharhorod	Sumy Oblast (4)	Lokomotyv Konotop
Chernivtsi Oblast (1)	Lada Chernivtsi	Vinnytsia Oblast (3)	Podillia Kyrnasivka	Sumy Oblast (4)	Budivelnyk Sumy
Chernivtsi Oblast (1)	Lada Chernivtsi	Vinnytsia Oblast (3)	Podillia Kyrnasivka	Sumy Oblast (4)	Spartak Okhtyrka

Group 4		Group 5		Group 6	
Region	Teams	Region	Teams	Region	Teams
Poltava Oblast (3)	Sula Lubny	Kharkiv Oblast (2)	Avanhard Lozova	Crimea (1)	Surozh Sudak
Poltava Oblast (3)	Vahonobudivnyk Kremenchuk	Kharkiv Oblast (2)	Oskil Kupiansk	Odesa Oblast (5)	Dunay Izmail
Poltava Oblast (3)	Lokomotyv Komsomolsk	Dnipropetrovsk Oblast (1)	Metalurh Dniprodzerzhynsk	Odesa Oblast (5)	Blaho Blahoyeve
Kharkiv Oblast (2)	Tsementnyk Balakleya	Zaporizhzhia Oblast (2)	Dyzelist Tokmak	Odesa Oblast (5)	Torpedo Odesa
Kharkiv Oblast (2)	Metalurh Kupiansk	Zaporizhzhia Oblast (2)	Enerhiya Berdiansk	Odesa Oblast (5)	Enerhiya Illichivsk
Kirovohrad Oblast (3)	Lokomotyv Znamianka	Luhansk Oblast (4)	Shakhtar Sverdlovsk	Odesa Oblast (5)	Dnistrovets Bilhorod-Dnistr.
Kirovohrad Oblast (3)	Krasnobudivnyk Oleksandria	Luhansk Oblast (4)	MALS Lutyhine	Dnipropetrovsk Oblast (1)	Budivelnyk Kryvyi Rih
Kirovohrad Oblast (3)	Polihraftekhnika-2 Oleksandria	Luhansk Oblast (4)	Koral Krasnyi Luch	Mykolaiv Oblast (4)	Kolos Novokrasne
Dnipropetrovsk Oblast (2)	Hirnyk Pavlohrad	Luhansk Oblast (4)	Antratsyt	Mykolaiv Oblast (4)	Olimpiya Yuzhnoukrainsk
Dnipropetrovsk Oblast (2)	Sirius Zhovti Vody	Donetsk Oblast (5)	Shakhtar Snizhne	Mykolaiv Oblast (4)	Vodnyk Mykolaiv
Donetsk Oblast (3)	Donbaskraft Kramatorsk	Donetsk Oblast (5)	Vuhlyk Dymytriv	Mykolaiv Oblast (4)	Kooperator Novyi Buh
Donetsk Oblast (3)	Azovmash Mariupol	Donetsk Oblast (5)	Krystal Torez	Kherson Oblast (3)	Kolos Osokorivka
Donetsk Oblast (3)	Vuhlyk Donetsk	Donetsk Oblast (5)	Harant Donetsk	Kherson Oblast (3)	Enerhiya Nova Kakhovka
Luhansk Oblast (1)	Avanhard Rovenky	Donetsk Oblast (5)	Pivdenstal Yenakieve	Kherson Oblast (3)	Tavriya Novotroitske

== Group 1 (Far West) ==
The group covered the following regions: Lviv Oblast, Zakarpattia Oblast, Volyn Oblast, Ivano-Frankivsk Oblast, Chernivtsi Oblast.

Pos	Team	Pld	W	D	L	GF	GA	GD	Pts	Notes
1	Beskyd Nadvirna (C, P)	24	18	5	1	48	15	+33	41	Promoted new
2	Khimik Kalush	24	15	3	6	50	30	+20	33	
3	Lada Chernivtsi	24	15	2	7	43	24	+19	32	new
4	Pidshypnyk Lutsk	24	11	8	5	34	21	+13	30	withdrew
5	Hirnyk Yavoriv Raion	24	11	5	8	39	30	+9	27	new
6	Halychyna Rozhniativ Raion	24	11	5	8	25	24	+1	27	
7	Aval Dovhe	24	9	7	8	33	24	+9	25	new
8	Yalynka Rakhiv Raion	24	11	2	11	32	33	−1	24	new
9	Pokuttia Kolomyya	24	6	7	11	20	24	−4	19	new
10	Shakhta 9 Novovolynsk	24	6	4	14	8	41	−33	16	new
11	Sokil-LORTA Lviv	24	6	3	15	23	35	−12	15	new
12	Shakhtar Chervonohrad	24	4	4	16	12	29	−17	12	new
13	Silmash Kovel	24	2	7	15	19	56	−37	11	new

Source: aafu website
(C) Champions; (P) Promoted

Notes

- The game Pokuttia-Halychyna took place in the village of Zabolotiv.
- Initially games Shakhtar-Lada 0:0 and Sokil-Shakhta 9 3:0 were all changed to -:+.
- The best scorer in group: V.Tsyvchyk (Pidshybnyk Lutsk) - 17.

== Group 2 (Near West) ==
The group covered following regions: Ivano-Frankivsk Oblast, Ternopil Oblast, Rivne Oblast, Khmelnytskyi Oblast, Vinnytsia Oblast, Zhytomyr Oblast.

Pos	Team	Pld	W	D	L	GF	GA	GD	Pts	Notes
1	Khutrovyk Tysmenytsia (C, P)	24	19	3	2	47	10	+37	41	Promoted new
2	Advis Khmelnytskyi	24	17	3	4	38	13	+25	37	new
3	Lokomotyv Rivne	24	10	9	5	22	15	+7	29	withdrew new
4	Zoria Husiatyn Raion	24	13	1	10	31	20	+11	27	new
5	Shkirianyk Berdychiv	24	12	3	9	30	33	−3	27	withdrew
6	Intehral Vinnytsia	24	11	2	11	34	34	0	24	withdrew
7	Podillia Tulchyn Raion	24	10	4	10	28	30	−2	24	withdrew
8	Medobory Husiatyn	24	10	4	10	22	32	−10	24	withdrew
9	Sluch Krasyliv	24	9	5	10	22	28	−6	23	
10	Hranyt Sharhorod	24	8	5	11	20	36	−16	21	withdrew
11	Fortuna Andrushivka	24	9	2	13	25	45	−20	20	withdrew
12	Iskra Teofipol	24	3	6	15	6	9	−3	12	withdrew
13	Start Kozova	24	0	1	23	4	24	−20	1	withdrew

Source: aafu website
(C) Champions; (P) Promoted

Notes

- Start and Iskra withdrew in the second half.
- Initially the game Zoria-Khutrovyk 0:0 was changed to -:+.
- The game Shkiryanyk-Sluch was conducted in the village of Myroslavka.
- Lokomotyv Rivne all its games played in Zdolbuniv, therefore in some records it's known as Lokomotyv Zdolbuniv. The games against Podillya Reshutsk (?) and Integral Rivne (?) were conducted in Rivne.
- The best scorer for the group was Serhiy Turyansky (Khutrovyk) - 12.

== Group 3 (Center) ==
The group covered the following regions: Zhytomyr Oblast, Kyiv Oblast, Kyiv-City, Cherkasy Oblast, Chernihiv Oblast, Sumy Oblast.

Pos	Team	Pld	W	D	L	GF	GA	GD	Pts	Promotion
1	Hart Borodianka (C)	26	19	4	3	58	16	+42	42	Promoted
2	Keramik Baranivka	26	17	7	2	50	20	+30	41	
3	Dynamo-3 Kyiv	26	17	6	3	44	13	+31	40	
4	Ahroservis Bakhmach	26	14	4	8	41	33	+8	32	
5	FC Cheksyl Chernihiv	26	10	9	7	34	27	+7	29	
6	Budivelnyk Ivankiv	26	12	4	10	27	29	−2	28	
7	Lokomotyv Konotop	26	9	7	10	25	33	−8	25	
8	Budivelnyk Sumy	26	8	9	9	29	34	−5	25	
9	Spartak Okhtyrka	26	7	10	9	30	34	−4	24	
10	Naftovyk Varva	26	10	3	13	23	36	−13	23	withdrew
11	Kray Kyiv	26	6	8	12	23	33	−10	20	
12	Esman Hlukhiv	26	6	7	13	26	40	−14	19	withdrew
13	Rotor Cherkasy	26	4	3	19	19	19	0	11	withdrew
14	Spartak Zolotonosha	26	2	1	23	11	73	−62	5	withdrew

Source: aafu website
(C) Champions

Notes

- Rotor and Spartak Zolotonosha withdrew in the second half.
- Spartak Okhtyrka played its games in Trostyanets (first half) and Kyrylivka (second half).
- The best scorer in the group P.Nesterchuk (Dynamo-3) - 14.

== Group 4 (Near East) ==
The group covered the following regions: Dnipropetrovsk Oblast, Luhansk Oblast, Poltava Oblast, Donetsk Oblast, Kharkiv Oblast, Kirovohrad Oblast.

Pos	Team	Pld	W	D	L	GF	GA	GD	Pts	Promotion
1	Sirius Zhovti Vody (C)	26	18	6	2	59	10	+49	42	Promoted
2	Avanhard Rovenky	26	19	3	4	49	18	+31	41	
3	Vahbud Kremenchuk	26	15	7	4	46	23	+23	37	
4	Vuhlyk Donetsk	26	14	5	7	35	19	+16	33	
5	Tsementnyk Balakleya	26	11	9	6	37	27	+10	31	withdrew
6	Hirnyk Pavlohrad	26	9	13	4	31	22	+9	31	
7	Metalurh Kupiansk	26	11	5	10	32	24	+8	27	
8	Sula Lubny	26	9	7	10	27	32	−5	25	
9	Krasbud Oleksandria	26	9	5	12	24	29	−5	23	withdrew
10	Azovmash Mariupol	26	8	4	14	24	44	−20	20	
11	Hirnyk Komsomolsk	26	7	6	13	25	38	−13	20	
12	Donbaskraft Kramatorsk	26	7	3	16	23	57	−34	17	
13	Polihraftekhnika-2 Oleksandria	26	4	1	21	12	24	−12	9	withdrew
14	Lokomotyv Znamianka	26	2	4	20	12	69	−57	8	

Source: aafu
(C) Champions

Notes

- Initially the game Hirnyk Komsomolsk-Avanhard Rovenky 2:2 was later changed to -:+.
- Polihraftekhnika-2 withdrew during the winter-break.
- The best scorer in the group were Yu.Hatilov (Vuhlyk Donetsk) and Serhiy Chuichenko (Tsementnyk Balaklea) - 14.
- For unknown reasons Azovmash placed ahead of Hirnyk even though even their head-to-head meetings finished in favor of Komsomolsk players.

== Group 5 (Far East) ==
The group covered the following regions: Dnipropetrovsk Oblast, Luhansk Oblast, Donetsk Oblast, Kharkiv Oblast, Zaporizhzhia Oblast.

Pos	Team	Pld	W	D	L	GF	GA	GD	Pts	Promotion
1	Oskil Kupiansk (C)	26	16	8	2	52	19	+33	40	Promoted
2	Shakhtar Sverdlovsk	26	17	4	5	53	23	+30	38	
3	Shakhtar Snizhne	26	15	5	6	52	41	+11	35	
4	Krystal Torez	26	14	5	7	45	26	+19	33	
5	Pivdenstal Yenakiyeve	26	11	7	8	35	34	+1	29	
6	Vuhlyk Dymytriv	26	11	6	9	51	33	+18	28	
7	Harant Donetsk	26	11	5	10	33	30	+3	27	
8	MALS Lutyhine	26	11	5	10	32	32	0	27	
9	Avanhard Lozova	26	10	4	12	35	37	−2	24	
10	Metalurh Dniprodzerzhynsk	26	6	11	9	30	30	0	23	withdrew
11	Enerhiya Berdiansk	26	6	5	15	30	63	−33	17	
12	Koral Krasnyi Luch	26	6	4	16	25	46	−21	16	
13	Dyzelist Tokmak	26	6	3	17	26	48	−22	15	withdrew
14	Antratsyt	26	5	2	19	30	67	−37	12	withdrew

Source: aafu
(C) Champions

Notes

- The best scorer: Serhiy Akymenko (Shakhtar Snizhne) - 23. He became the best out of all groups.

== Group 6 (South) ==
The group covered the following regions: Crimea, Kherson Oblast, Odesa Oblast, Mykolaiv Oblast, Dnipropetrovsk Oblast.

Pos	Team	Pld	W	D	L	GF	GA	GD	Pts	Promotion
1	Surozh Sudak (C)	26	20	4	2	56	13	+43	44	Promoted
2	Tavria Novotroitsk	26	20	3	3	59	17	+42	43	
3	Blaho Ivaniv Raion	26	15	7	4	40	25	+15	37	
4	Olimpiya Yuzhnoukrainsk	26	15	6	5	40	24	+16	36	
5	Enerhiya Nova Kakhovka	26	12	4	10	44	37	+7	28	
6	Torpedo Odesa	26	12	4	10	39	37	+2	28	
7	Enerhiya Illichivsk	26	11	5	10	37	27	+10	27	
8	Dnistrovets B.-Dnistrovskyi	26	11	3	12	34	29	+5	25	
9	Kooperator Novyi Buh	26	10	3	13	28	28	0	23	withdrew
10	Kolos Novokrasne	26	8	6	12	36	52	−16	22	withdrew
11	Dunay Izmail	26	6	9	11	20	37	−17	21	
12	Kolos Osokorivka	26	6	7	13	23	43	−20	19	
13	Budivelnyk Kryvyi Rih	26	2	3	21	13	73	−60	7	
14	Vodnyk Mykolaiv	26	0	4	22	7	34	−27	4	withdrew

Source: aafu
(C) Champions

Notes

- Surozh Sudak played all its games in Zolote Pole.
- Vodnyk Mykoaliv withdrew during the winter break.
- Initially the games Enerhiya Illichivsk - Olimpiya Yuzhnoukrainsk 3:1, Dnistrovets - Surozh 4:1, and Dnistrovets - Blaho 3:0 later were all changed to -:+.
- The best group scorer: I.Shtykhar (Enerhiya Nova Kakhovka) - 16.

== Promotion ==
To the 1993–94 Ukrainian Transitional League were promoted all six group winners FC Beskyd Nadvirna, FC Khutrovyk Tysmenytsia, FC Hart Borodianka, FC Sirius Zhovti Vody, FC Oskil Kupiansk, FC Surozh Sudak. Beside the winners of amateur competitions to the Transitional League were also admitted other amateur teams passing the tournament.

== Number of teams by region ==
Number	Region	Team(s)
8	Donetsk Oblast	Azovmash Mariupol, Donbaskraft Kramatorsk, Harant Donetsk, Krystal Torez, Pivdenstal Yenakieve, Shakhtar Snizhne, Vuhlyk Donetsk, Vuhlyk Dymytrov
5	Ivano-Frankivsk Oblast	Beskyd Nadvirna, Halychyna Broshniv, Khimik Kalush, Khutrovyk Tysmenytsia, Pokuttia Kolomyia
5	Luhansk Oblast	FC Antratsyt, Avanhard Rovenky, Koral Krasnyi Luch, MALS Lutyhine, Shakhtar Sverdlovsk
5	Odesa Oblast	Blaho Blahoyeve, Dnistrovets Bilhorod-Dnistrovskyi, Dunai Izmail, Enerhia Illichivsk, Torpedo Odesa
4	Dnipropetrovsk Oblast	Budivelnyk Kryvyi Rih, Hirnyk Pavlohrad, Metalurh Dniprodzerzhynsk, Sirius Zhovti Vody
4	Kharkiv Oblast	Avanhard Lozova, Metalurh Kupiansk, Oskil Kupiansk, Tsementnyk Balakleya
4	Mykolaiv Oblast	Kolos Novokrasne, Kooperator Novyi Buh, Olimpia AES Yuzhnoukrainsk, Vodnyk Mykolaiv
4	Sumy Oblast	Budivelnyk Sumy, Esman Hlukhiv, Lokomotyv Konotop, Spartak Okhtyrka
3	Kherson Oblast	Enerhia Nova Kakhovka, Kolos Osokorivka, Tavria Novotriotske
3	Khmelnytskyi Oblast	Advis Khmelnytskyi, Iskra Teofipol, Sluch Krasyliv
3	Kirovohrad Oblast	Kranobudivnyk Oleksandria, Lokomotyv Znamianka, Polihraftekhnika-2 Oleksandria
3	Lviv Oblast	Shakhtar Chervonohrad, Hirnyk Novoyavorivsk, Sokil-LORTA Lviv
3	Poltava Oblast	Lokomotyv Komsomolsk, Sula Lubny, Vahonobudivnyk Kremenchuk
3	Ternopil Oblast	Medobory Husiatyn, Start Kozova, Zorya Khorostkiv
3	Vinnytsia Oblast	Hranyt Sharhorod, Intehral Vinnytsia, Podillia Kyrnasivka
3	Volyn Oblast	Pidshypnyk Lutsk, Silmash Kovel, Shakhta 9 Novovolynsk
2	Cherkasy Oblast	Rotor Cherkasy, Spartak Zolotonosha
2	Chernihiv Oblast	Ahroservis Bakhmach, Tekstylnyk Chernihiv
2	Kyiv	Dynamo-3, Krai
2	Kyiv Oblast	Budivelnyk Ivankiv, Hart Borodianka
2	Zakarpattia Oblast	Aval Dovhe, Yalynka Velykyi Bychkiv
2	Zaporizhia Oblast	Dyzelist Tokmak, Enerhia Berdiansk
1	Autonomous Republic of Crimea	Surozh Sudak
1	Rivne Oblast	Lokomotyv Rivne

== See also ==
- Ukrainian Third League 1992–93
- Ukrainian Cup 1992-93
