= 1994–95 Ukrainian Second League =

Ukrainian Second League
- Season: 1994–95
- Champions: Yavir Krasnopillia
- Relegated: none
- Top goalscorer: 23 - Anatoliy Borysenko (Tytan Armyansk); Volodymyr Kukhlevsky (Hazovyk Komarno)

The 1994–95 Ukrainian Second League was the fourth season of 3rd level professional football in Ukraine.

== Teams ==
=== Relegated teams ===
- Desna Chernihiv - (debut)
- Artania Ochakiv - (debut)

=== Promoted teams ===
- Sirius Kryvyi Rih - winner of the Third League (debut)
- Dynamo Saky - runner-up of the Third League (debut)
- Viktor Zaporizhzhia - placed third in the Third League (debut)
- FC Lviv - placed fourth in the Third League (debut)

=== Renamed teams ===
- During the season Ros Bila Tserkva changed its name to Transimpeks-Ros Bila Tserkva
- During the season Tavriya Kherson changed its name to Vodnyk Kherson
- During the season Metalurh Kerch changed its name to Okean Kerch
- During the season Garant Donetsk changed its name to Shakhtar-2 Donetsk

=== Location map ===
Locations of team home grounds in Ukrainian Second League 1992-93

== Stadiums ==
The following stadiums are considered home grounds for the teams in the competition.

Rank	Stadium	Capacity	Club
1	Kranivnyk Stadium	5,000	Halychyna Drohobych
2	Avanhard Stadium	5,000	Sirius Zhovti Vody
3	Lokomotyv Stadium	5,000	Viktor Zaporizhzhia
4	Avanhard Stadium	3,500	Dynamo Saky
5	Avanhard Stadium	3,000	Dynamo Luhansk
6	Kolos Stadium	3,000	Yavir Krasnopillia
7	Yunist Stadium	3,000	FC Lviv
8	Olimpiyskyi Stadium	3,000	Meliorator Kakhovka
9	Yuvileinyi Stadium	2,000	Medita Shakhtarsk
10	Artania Stadium	2,000	Artania Ochakiv
11	Chaika Stadium	2,000	Chaika Sevastopol
12	Tytan Stadium	2,000	Tytan Armyansk
13	Gagarin Stadium	1,500	Desna Chernihiv
14	Hazovyk Stadium	1,500	Hazovyk Komarno
15	Hirnyk Stadium	1,500	Shakhtar Pavlohrad
16	Azovstal Stadium	1,500	Azovets Mariupol
17	Khimik Stadium	1,500	Tytan Armyansk
18	Trudovi Rezervy Stadium	1,000	Ros Bila Tserkva
19	Druzhba Stadium	1,000	Druzhba Berdyansk
20	October 50th Anniversary Stadium	1,000	Metalurh Kerch
21	Donbass Stadium	500	Garant Donetsk
22	SKA Stadium	200	Chornomorets-2 Odesa

== Final standings ==
Pos	Team	Pld	W	D	L	GF	GA	GD	Pts	Promotion or relegation
1	Yavir Krasnopillia (C, P)	42	29	6	7	71	30	+41	93	Promoted to First League
2	FC Lviv (P)	42	30	3	9	73	39	+34	93	Promoted to First League
3	Dynamo Luhansk (D)	42	26	5	11	72	47	+25	83	Merged with Metalurh Mariupol
4	Dynamo Saky	42	25	5	12	62	33	+29	80	
5	Halychyna Drohobych	42	25	5	12	49	29	+20	80	
6	Titan Armyansk	42	22	10	10	68	36	+32	76	
7	Medita Shakhtarsk	42	22	8	12	57	36	+21	74	
8	Hazovyk Komarno	42	22	6	14	66	39	+27	72	
9	Meliorator Kakhovka	42	21	9	12	49	40	+9	72	
10	Druzhba Berdiansk	42	16	11	15	41	43	−2	59	
11	Desna Chernihiv	42	17	7	18	44	43	+1	58	
12	Azovets Mariupol	42	17	6	19	37	55	−18	57	
13	Chaika Sevastopol	42	16	8	18	42	45	−3	56	
14	Transimpeks-Ros Bila Tserkva	42	14	7	21	41	63	−22	49	
15	Artania Ochakiv (D)	42	13	8	21	30	58	−28	47	Merged with Olympiya FC
16	Sirius Kryvyi Rih (Note: Sirius Kryvyi Rih moved from Zhovti Vody in June 1995.) (D)	42	13	6	23	40	57	−17	45	Merged with Sportinvest Kryvyi Rih
17	Viktor Zaporizhzhia	42	12	6	24	54	60	−6	42	
18	Vodnyk Kherson	42	11	7	24	35	61	−26	40	
19	Okean Kerch (D)	42	11	5	26	42	67	−25	38	Withdrew
20	Shakhtar-2 Donetsk	42	10	7	25	37	71	−34	37	
21	Chornomorets-2 Odesa (D)	42	6	11	25	19	48	−29	29	Replaced with FC Dynamo-Dogma Odesa
22	Shakhtar Pavlohrad	42	5	12	25	33	62	−29	27	Avoided relegation

Source: uafootball.net.ua
(C) Champions; (D) Disqualified; (P) Promoted

=== Top goalscorers ===
	Scorer	Goals (Pen.)	Team
1	Anatoliy Borysenko	23 (1)	Bazhanovets Makiivka
1	Volodymyr Kukhlevsky	23 (8)	Hazovyk Komarno
3	Bohdan Bandura	21 (1)	Lviv
3	Kostyantyn Pinchuk	21 (11)	Dynamo Luhansk
5	Serhiy Dranov	14	Chaika / Shakhtar-2
5	Yuriy Hetman	14 (1)	Dynamo Luhansk
5	Ihor Koliada	14 (2)	Meliorator Kakhovka
5	Artyom Lopatkin	14 (3)	Dynamo Saky
5	Valeriy Samolyuk	14 (3)	Yavir Krasnopillia
5	Oleh Haras	14 (7)	Lviv

Druha Liha 1994-95 winners

1st title

== See also ==
- 1994–95 Ukrainian First League
- 1994–95 Ukrainian Premier League
- Ukrainian Third League 1994-95
