= 1995–96 Ukrainian Second League =

Ukrainian Second League
- Season: 1995–96
- Champions: (A) - CSKA Kyiv (B) - Metalurh Mariupol
- Promoted: CSKA Kyiv, Metalurh Mariupol, Metalurh Donetsk
- Relegated: 11 teams (9 withdrew)
- Top goalscorer: 18 - A.Heto (Avanhard Zh.); 15 - Yuriy Hetman (Metalurh M.), A.Kryvoruchko (Oskil)
- Biggest home win: Khutrovyk - Dynamo 8:0
- Biggest away win: Prometei - Chaika 0:11
- Highest scoring: Prometei - Chaika 0:11

The 1995–96 Ukrainian Second League was the fifth season of 3rd level professional football in Ukraine.

The league was reorganized and, since being split three seasons ago, merged with the lower league tier known as Ukrainian Third League. Most teams of the lower league were promoted, while the Second League was divided into two groups based geographical location of clubs. The total number of participants was 43.

== Teams ==
The league was merged with Ukrainian Third League bringing the top 16 teams of the 1994–95 league's season along with the newly promoted teams from amateurs.

=== Promoted teams ===
- FC Kalush - Group 1 winner of the Amateur League (debut)
- Haray Zhovkva - Group 2 winner of the Amateur League (debut)
- Obolon Kyiv - Group 3 winner of the Amateur League (debut)
- Sportinvest Kryvyi Rih - Group 4 winner of the Amateur League (debut)
- Dynamo Sloviansk - Group 5 winner of the Amateur League (debut)
- Portovyk Illichivsk - Group 6 winner of the Amateur League (debut)
- Hirnyk Komsomolsk - Group 3 fifth place of the Amateur League (debut)
- Shakhtar Sverdlovsk - Group 5 second place of the Amateur League (debut)
- Prometei Dniprodzerzhynsk - Group 5 eleventh place of the Amateur League (debut)

=== Relegated teams ===
- Karpaty Mukacheve – 21st place of the First League (debut)
- Ahrotekhservis Sumy – 22nd place of the First League (debut)

=== Replaced/merged teams ===
- Olimpiya Yuzhnoukrainsk (Amateur League Group 6) replaced withdrawn Artaniya Ochakiv
- Sportinvest Kryvyi Rih (Amateur League Group 4) merged and replaced Sirius Kryvyi Rih
- Dynamo-Dahma Odesa (Amateur League Group 6) replaced withdrawn Chornomorets-2 Odesa
- Metalurh Donetsk reorganized during the season in place of bankrupted Shakhtar Shakhtarsk
- Metalurh Mariupol, previously as Azovets, merged with and replace Dynamo Luhansk
- Temp-Advis-2 Khemlnytskyi before season was FC Advis Khmelnytskyi that merged with FC Temp Shepetivka becoming its reserve team

=== Withdrawn teams ===
- Okean Kerch withdrew before start of the season.
- Vahonobudivnyk Kremenchuk that was recently promoted from the Ukrainian Third League withdrew before start of the season.

=== Renamed teams ===
- Krystal Kherson was called Vodnyk Kherson
- Nyva-Kosmos Myronivka was called Nyva Myronivka
- FC Kalush was called Khimik Kalush
- Ros Bila Tserkva was called Transimpeks-Ros Bila Tserkva
- FC Kakhovka was called Meliorator Kakhovka
- Ahrotekhservis Sumy was called FC Sumy
- Skify Lviv was called Skify-LAZ Lviv
- Kosmos Pavlohrad was called Shakhtar Pavlohrad
- Shakhtar Shakhtarsk was called Medita Shakhtarsk
- Obolon Kyiv was called Obolon-Zmina Kyiv
- Dynamo-Flesh Odesa was called Dynamo-Dahma Odesa
- Metalurh Mariupol was called Azovets Mariupol

=== Location map ===
Locations of team home grounds in Ukrainian Second League 1992-93

== Group A ==
Pos	Team	Pld	W	D	L	GF	GA	GD	Pts	Promotion or relegation
1	CSKA Kyiv (C, P)	40	27	8	5	61	27	+34	89	Promoted to Persha Liha
2	Krystal Kherson	40	24	7	9	75	29	+46	79	Play off
3	Khutrovyk Tysmenytsia	40	24	3	13	66	33	+33	75	
4	Obolon Kyiv	40	22	9	9	60	35	+25	75	
5	Kalush	40	22	8	10	64	31	+33	74	
6	Nyva-Cosmos Myronivka	40	21	10	9	59	36	+23	73	
7	Desna Chernihiv	40	21	9	10	55	30	+25	72	
8	Haray Zhovkva	40	20	7	13	49	35	+14	67	
9	Systema-Boreks Borodianka	40	17	12	11	34	31	+3	63	
10	Hazovyk Komarno	40	18	8	14	47	38	+9	62	
11	Avanhard Zhydachiv	40	18	8	14	44	44	0	62	
12	Karpaty Mukacheve	40	17	8	15	39	35	+4	59	
13	Keramik Baranivka	40	18	5	17	38	41	−3	59	
14	Halychyna Drohobych	40	16	8	16	39	40	−1	56	
15	Skhid Slavutych	40	14	10	16	43	51	−8	52	
16	Olimpiya Yuzhnoukrainsk	40	12	7	21	34	67	−33	43	
17	Ros Bila Tserkva	40	10	9	21	28	61	−33	39	
18	Ahrotekhservis Sumy (D)	40	8	6	26	25	77	−52	30	Dissolved
19	Skify Lviv (Note: SC Skify Lviv and FC Kakhovka quit the League after the first half.) (D)	40	6	5	29	20	28	−8	23	Withdrew
20	Dynamo-Flesh Odesa (D)	40	3	6	31	12	85	−73	15	Dissolved
21	Kakhovka (D)	40	3	3	34	11	49	−38	12	Withdrew
22	Temp-Advis-2 Shepetivka (Note: FC Temp-Advis-2 Shepetivka stopped its participation after the 7th round (results were scratched).) (D)	7	0	0	7	2	15	−13	0	Withdrew

Source: uafootball.net.ua
(C) Champions; (D) Disqualified; (P) Promoted

=== Top goalscorers ===
	Scorer	Goals (Pen.)	Team
1	Andriy Heto	18	Avanhard Zhydachiv
2	Vasyl Fedoriv	16	Kalush
2	Andriy Pshenychnykov	16	Krystal Kherson
4	Petro Pylypeyko	15	Desna Chernihiv
5	Oleh Bychenko	12 (2)	Obolon Kyiv
5	Anatoliy Lukashenko	12 (3)	Keramik Baranivka

== Group B ==
Pos	Team	Pld	W	D	L	GF	GA	GD	Pts	Promotion or relegation
1	Metalurh Mariupol (C, P)	38	30	4	4	70	24	+46	94	Promoted to Persha Liha
2	Metalurh Donetsk (O, P)	38	24	7	7	53	27	+26	79	Play off
3	Metalurh Novomoskovsk	38	23	6	9	53	33	+20	75	
4	Oskil Kupiansk	38	21	7	10	45	28	+17	70	
5	Avanhard-Industria Rovenky	38	19	11	8	45	36	+9	68	
6	Tytan Armyansk	38	19	10	9	59	38	+21	67	
7	Shakhtar Stakhanov	38	19	9	10	41	33	+8	66	
8	Viktor Zaporizhzhia	38	19	5	14	54	34	+20	62	
9	Shakhtar-2 Donetsk	38	18	7	13	44	32	+12	61	
10	Dynamo Saky	38	17	8	13	42	36	+6	59	
11	Druzhba Berdiansk	38	17	8	13	41	38	+3	59	
12	Chaika Sevastopol	38	17	7	14	55	39	+16	58	
13	Torpedo Melitopol	38	12	14	12	44	35	+9	50	
14	Portovyk Illichivsk	38	14	5	19	30	56	−26	47	
15	Dnistrovets B.-Dnistrovskyi (D)	38	13	7	18	25	54	−29	46	Withdrew
16	Hirnyk Komsomolsk	38	10	8	20	33	71	−38	38	
17	Sportinvest Kryvyi Rih (Note: After the winter break three other teams stopped their participation: Prometey Dniprodzerzhynsk, Dynamo Slovyansk, Sportinvest Kryvyi Rih.) (D)	38	6	2	30	20	33	−13	20	Withdrew
18	Shakhtar Sverdlovsk (Note: Shakhtar Sverdlovsk withdrew after the 25th round.) (D)	38	5	4	29	24	37	−13	19	Withdrew
19	Dynamo Slovyansk (D)	38	1	8	29	13	36	−23	11	Withdrew
20	Prometey Dniprodzerzhynsk (D)	38	1	1	36	10	81	−71	4	Withdrew
21	Kosmos Pavlohrad (Note: Kosmos Pavlohrad quit competition after the 11th round. All its results were annulled.) (D)	11	0	6	5	10	20	−10	6	Withdrew

Source: uafootball.net.ua
(C) Champions; (D) Disqualified; (O) Play-off winners; (P) Promoted

=== Top goalscorers ===
	Scorer	Goals (Pen.)	Team
1	Yuriy Hetman	15	Metalurh Mariupol
1	Oleksandr Kryvoruchko	15	Oskil Kupiansk
3	Vasyl Herasymchuk	14 (5)	Chaika Sevastopol
3	Kostiantyn Pinchuk	14 (6)	Metalurh Mariupol
5	Vadym Vasiliev	13	Metalurh Donetsk

== Play off ==
Play off game was announced as soon as FC Naftokhimik Kremenchuk that competed in the First League decided to withdraw from competitions. The game was scheduled among two runners-up from each of two groups FC Krystal Kherson and FC Metalurh Donetsk.

2 August 1996

Metalurh Donetsk	3 : 1	Krystal Kherson
Androshchuk 20'; Korol 36'; Sevidov 74'	(Report)	Malchenko 86'

Olympiyskiy NSC, Kyiv
Attendance: 1,500
Referee: Serhiy Tatulian, Kyiv

Metalurh Donetsk won play off game and promoted to the 1996-97 Ukrainian First League.

== See also ==
- 1995–96 Ukrainian Premier League
- 1995–96 Ukrainian First League
- 1995–96 Ukrainian Cup
