= FC Systema-Boreks Borodianka =

Ukrainian football club

Systema-Boreks Borodianka
- Full name: Systema-Boreks Borodianka
- Founded: 1978
- Dissolved: 2003
- President: Vitaliy Pylypenko
- Manager: Viktor Zhylin

FC Systema-Boreks Borodianka (Ukrainian: Система-Борекс) was a Ukrainian football club of Bordianka excavation equipment factory (Ukrainian: Бородянський екскаваторний завод) from Borodianka, Kyiv Oblast.

The Borodianka club has a long history of participating in Ukrainian KFK competitions among "collectives of physical culture" (so-called amateur teams). A local heavy equipment manufacturer, Boreks (Borodianka), sponsored the Borodianka team. The name Boreks is a portmanteau of Borodianka and excavator. During the Soviet period, the team carried the name of Mashynobudivnyk.

The club was dissolved during the 2003-2004 winter break and temporarily merged with FC Borysfen Boryspil, becoming their reserve team. For the 2004–05 Ukrainian Second League season, the club was replaced by FC Osvita.

== History ==
In 1992, the club was originally known as Hart Borodianka, based on the Central Sports Club "Hart" of the Ministry of Education, competed at the Amateur level, and were champions in the 3rd Zone of the Ukrainian KFK competition. The next season they entered the semi-professional Ukrainian Transitional League.

In 1994 Ukrainian Transitional League was reorganized as the Third League and before the 1994–95 season the club renamed themselves to Systema-Boreks Borodianka for which they were better known while they competed in the professional leagues. With reasonable success, the club spent two seasons in the Ukrainian First League. In 2003, the club was de facto dissolved and became a farm team of FC Borysfen Boryspil, carrying the name of Boreks-Borysfen Borodianka.

=== FC Osvita ===
Before the 2004–05 season, the club was reformed and renamed Osvita Borodianka , becoming a base professional team for the All-Ukrainian Football Association of Students (Russian: Всеукраинская футбольная ассоциация студентов). In 2005, the club was struggling financially and eventually folded during the 2005–06 season. In 2006, it was replaced in the championship by another club from Boyarka, Boyarka-2006.

=== Honours ===
- Ukrainian Second League
  - Winners (1): 2001-02
  - Runners-up (1): 2000-01
- Ukrainian Football Amateur League (also as Ukrainian KFK competitions)
  - Winners (1): 1992-93
  - Runners-up (1): 1983
- Ukrainian Amateur Cup
  - Winners (1): 1986 (as Mashynobudivnyk)

== League and cup history ==
=== Soviet Union ===
Season	Div.	Pos.	Pl.	W	D	L	GS	GA	P	Domestic Cup	Europe	Notes
1985	4th (KFK)	no participation										
1986	4th (KFK)	3	16	8	4	4	33	16	20			
1987	4th (KFK)	no participation										
1988	4th (KFK)	3	22	16	1	5	52	20	33			
1989	4th (KFK)	4	24	11	7	6	32	32	29			
1990	4th (KFK)	12	30	9	6	15	27	45	24			
1991	4th (KFK)	12										

=== Ukraine ===
Season	Div.	Pos.	Pl.	W	D	L	GS	GA	P	Domestic Cup	Europe	Notes
1992–93	4th (KFK)	1	26	19	4	3	58	16	42			Promoted – as Hart Borodianka
1993–94	3rd (lower) (Perekhidna Liha)	5	34	18	11	5	52	16	47	Did not enter		
1994–95	3rd (lower) (Tretia Liha)	6	42	23	6	13	61	31	75	1/16 finals		Promoted
1995–96	3rd "A" (Druha Liha "A")	9	40	17	12	11	34	31	63	1/128 finals		
1996–97	3rd "A" (Druha Liha "A")	8	30	11	8	11	28	31	41	1/64 finals		
1997–98	3rd "A" (Druha Liha "A")	9	34	12	13	9	34	23	49	1/128 finals		
1998–99	3rd "A" (Druha Liha "A")	7	28	13	7	8	22	20	46	1/64 finals		
1999-00	3rd "A" (Druha Liha "A")	5	30	12	11	7	32	17	47	1/8 finals Second League Cup		
2000–01	3rd "B" (Druha Liha "B")	2	28	18	8	2	46	15	62	1/8 finals Second League Cup		
2001–02	3rd "B" (Druha Liha "B")	1	34	20	8	6	53	23	68	1st Round		Promoted
2002–03	2nd (Persha Liha)	15	34	9	13	12	28	28	40	1/32 finals		
2003–04	2nd (Persha Liha)	17	34	8	5	21	29	52	29	1/32 finals		Renamed — Relegated
2004–05	3rd "A" (Druha Liha "A")	7	28	12	10	6	34	22	46	1/32 finals		as Osvita Borodianka
2005–06	3rd "A" (Druha Liha "A")	initially moved to Kyiv, the club was replaced with Boyarka-2006 in mid-season										

== Managers ==
FC Mashynobudivnyk

- (Soviet Union) Viktor Zhylin (1980–1981)
- (Soviet Union) Viktor Zhylin (1985–1986)

FC Systema-Boreks

- (Ukraine) Viktor Zhylin (1993 – Jun, 1995)
- (Ukraine) Viktor Pobehayev (Jul, 1995 – Nov, 1996)
- (Ukraine) Vadym Lazorenko (1996 – 1997)
- (Ukraine) Viktor Zhylin (Jan, 1997 – Nov, 2002)

FC Boreks-Borysfen

- (Ukraine) Oleksandr Tomakh (Jan, 2003 – Nov, 2003)
- (Ukraine) Stepan Matviyiv (Jan, 2004 – Jun, 2004)

FC Osvita

- (Ukraine) Pavlo Matviychenko (Jul, 2004 – Jun, 2005)
- (Ukraine) Yuriy Moroz (Jul, 2005 – Nov, 2005)

== See also ==
- FC Inter Boyarka
- FC Borysfen Boryspil
