= Oleksiy Hetman =

Ukrainian footballer and coach

Personal information
- Full name: Oleksiy Oleksiyovych Hetman
- Date of birth: 16 August 1975 (age 51)
- Place of birth: Voroshilovgrad, Ukrainian SSR
- Height: 1.67 m (5 ft 5 1/2 in)
- Positions: Defender; midfielder

Team information
- Current team: FC Illichivets Mariupol (U21 asst manager)

Youth career
- LVUFK Luhansk

Senior career*
Years	Team	Apps	(Gls)
1992–1995	FC Dynamo Luhansk	84	(1)
1995–1998	FC Metalurh Mariupol	71	(0)
1999	FC Sintez	29	(3)
1999	FC Metalurh Donetsk	0	(0)
2000	FC Mashynobudivnyk Druzhkivka	6	(0)
2000	FC Zhemchuzhina Sochi	21	(3)
2001	FC Rostselmash Rostov-on-Don	12	(0)
2002	FC SKA Rostov-on-Don	2	(0)
2002–2003	FC Illich-Stal Mariupol		
2003	FC Volgar-Gazprom Astrakhan	6	(0)
2003–2004	FC Zorya Luhansk	4	(0)
2005	FC Portovyk Mariupol		
2006	FC Illich-Agro Mariupol		

Managerial career
- 2008–2010: FC Illichivets Mariupol (assistant)
- 2011–2012: FC Illichivets-2 Mariupol (assistant)
- 2012–: FC Illichivets Mariupol (U21 assistant)
- * Club domestic league appearances and goals

Oleksiy Oleksiyovych Hetman (Ukrainian: Олексій Олексійович Гетьман; born 16 August 1975) is a Ukrainian football coach and a former player. He works as an assistant manager with the U21 team of FC Illichivets Mariupol.

Hetman played for FC Zhemchuzhina Sochi in the 2000 Russian First Division.

He is the younger brother of Yuriy Hetman.
