= List of sports derbies in Ukraine =

This is a list of sports city derbies or other rivalries in Ukraine among professional teams. Those include games where rival teams met with each other more than one season.

== Association football ==
=== Premier League ===
- Klasychne derby or National rivalry Dynamo Kyiv vs. Shakhtar Donetsk
- Main Donbas rivalry Shakhtar Donetsk vs. Zorya Luhansk
- Galicia – Volhynia (West Ukrainian) rivalry Karpaty Lviv vs. Volyn Lviv
- Main Kyiv derby (Capital derby) Dynamo vs. Arsenal (CSKA)
- Kyiv derby Dynamo vs. Obolon
- Kyiv derby Arsenal vs. Obolon
- Donetsk derby Shakhtar vs. Metalurh
- Zaporizhzhia derby Metalurh vs. Torpedo
- Lviv derby Karpaty vs. Lviv
- Kharkiv derby Metalist vs. Kharkiv
- Odesa derby Chornomorets vs. Odesa
- Donetsk (Donbas) rivalry Shakhtar vs. Olimpik, conducted outside of Donetsk due to Russian aggression

=== Regional derbies ===
- Volhynian rivalry Volyn Lutsk vs. Veres Rivne
- Podillian rivalry Nyva Vn. vs. Podillia Khmelnytskyi
- Carpathian rivalry Hoverla (Zakarpattia) vs. Prykarpattia Ivano-Frankivsk
- Carpathian (West Ukrainian) rivalry Hoverla (Zakarpattia) vs. Karpaty Lviv
- [Great] Galician derby Karpaty Lviv vs. Prykarpattia Ivano-Frankivsk
- West Ukrainian derby Rukh Vynnyky vs. Prykarpattia Ivano-Frankivsk
- West Ukrainian derby Volyn Lutsk vs. Prykarpattia Ivano-Frankivsk
- Dnipro–Kharkiv rivalry FC Dnipro vs. Metalist Kharkiv (SC Dnipro-1 vs. Metalist 1925)

=== AR Crimea ===
- Main Crimean rivalry Tavriya Simferopol vs. FC Sevastopol (Top level)
- Crimean rivalry FC Sevastopol vs. Krymteplytsia Molodizhne (by Football Federation of Ukraine and Professional Football League)

=== Donetsk Oblast ===
- Donetsk Oblast (Donbas) rivalry Shakhtar Donetsk vs. [Illichivets] Mariupol (Top level) (by Segodnya)
- Donetsk Oblast (Donbas) rivalry Metalurh Donetsk vs. [Illichivets] Mariupol (Top level) (by Football Federation of Ukraine)
- Donetsk Oblast rivalry Illichivets Mariupol vs. Shakhtar-2 Donetsk
- Donetsk Oblast rivalry Olimpik Donetsk vs. Avanhard Kramatorsk

=== Dnipropetrovsk Oblast ===
- Main Dnipropetrovsk Oblast rivalry FC Dnipro vs. Kryvbas Kryvyi Rih (Top level)
- Dnipropetrovsk Oblast rivalry Dnipro vs. Stal Dniprodzerzhynsk (Top level)
- Dnipropetrovsk Oblast rivalry Metalurh Nikopol vs. Shakhtar Pavlohrad

=== Luhansk Oblast ===
- Main Luhansk Oblast rivalry Zorya Luhansk vs. Stal Alchevsk (Top level)
- Luhansk Oblast rivalry Stal Alchevsk vs. Khimik Severodonetsk
- Luhansk Oblast rivalry Zorya Luhansk vs. Khimik Severodonetsk

=== Sumy Oblast ===
- Main Sumy Oblast rivalry Naftovyk Okhtyrka vs. [Yavir]–Sumy
- Sumy Oblast rivalry Naftovyk Okhtyrka vs. SBTS Sumy
- Sumy Oblast rivalry Naftovyk Okhtyrka vs. FC Sumy

=== Poltava Oblast ===
- Main Poltava Oblast rivalry Vorskla Poltava vs. Neftekhimik Kremenchuk
- Poltava Oblast rivalry FC Poltava vs. Hirnyk-Sport

=== Ivano-Frankivsk Oblast ===
- Main Ivano-Frankivsk Oblast rivalry Prykarpattia Ivano-Frankivsk vs. Enerhetyk Burshtyn
- Ivano-Frankivsk Oblast rivalry Spartak Ivano-Frankivsk vs. Enerhetyk Burshtyn

=== Kirovohrad Oblast ===
- Kirovohrad Oblast rivalry Zirka Kropyvnytskyi vs. [Polihraftekhnika] Oleksandriya (Top level)

=== Zakarpattia Oblast ===
- Zakarpattia Oblast rivalry Zakarpattia Uzhhorod vs. Pryladyst Mukacheve

=== Mykolaiv Oblast ===
- Mykolaiv Oblast rivalry Evis Mykolaiv vs. Artania Ochakiv

=== Khmelnytskyi Oblast ===
- Khmelnytskyi Oblast rivalry Podillya Khmelnytskyi vs. Temp [Ratusha]

=== Lviv Oblast ===
- Lviv Oblast rivalry Karpary Lviv vs. Hazovyk-Skala

=== City derbies (professional league games) ===
==== Kharkiv ====
- Kharkiv derby: Spartak – Silmash (1937–1939) - Soviet Top League (Group A) (1:4, 0:2, 1:5)
- Kharkiv derby: Spartak – Dynamo (1936, 1937, 1939) (1:1, 2:1, 1:5)
- Kharkiv derby: Dynamo – Silmash (1937, 1939, 1940) (1:2, 0:5, 3:1, 5:2)
- Kharkiv derby: Dynamo – Traktor (1937) (3:0)
- Kharkiv derby: Spartak – Traktor (1937) (3:0)
- Kharkiv derby: Silmash – Traktor (1937) (1:3)
- Kharkiv derby: Lokomotyv – Dzerzhynets (1947, 1948) (1:0, 5:3, 2:0, 8:1)
- Kharkiv derby: Torpedo – Dzerzhynets (1949) (0:1, 1:4)
- Kharkiv derby: Arsenal – Metalist-2 (1999/0–2001/2) (0:2, 0:0, 2:0, 4:1, 1:0, 0:6)
- Kharkiv derby: Arsenal – Metalist (2003/4) (1:2, 1:1)
- Kharkiv derby: Helios – Metalist-2 (2003/4, 2004/5) (1:1, 0:1, 4:1, 2:2)
- Main Kharkiv derby: Kharkiv – Metalist (2005/6–2008/9) (1:0, 0:1, 2:0, 0:0, 0:2, 0:2, 1:1, 1:2)
- Kharkiv derby: Arsenal – Kharkiv-2 (2005/6) (4:0, 2:1)
- Kharkiv derby: Helios – Kharkiv (2009/10) (5:0, 0:1)

==== Kyiv ====
- Kyiv derby: Dynamo – Lokomotyv (1938) – Soviet Top League (Group A) (1:1)
- Kyiv derby: DO – Spartak (1949) (2:2, 2:0)
- Kyiv derby: Arsenal – Temp/Oktiabrsky Raion (1960–1962) (0:0, 2:0, 2:1, 3:1, 2:0, 2:3)
- Kyiv derby: Arsenal – SKA (1963) (1:0, 0:2)
- Kyiv derby: Dynamo-2 – SKA/CSKA[-2] (1992, 1996/7–2007/8) (1:0, 2:0, 3:0, 1:1, 3:1, 2:0, 1:0, 1:1, 2:0, 0:1, 3:0, 1:3, 2:2, 0:2, 2:0, 2:2, 4:1, 4:1, 0:1, 0:2, 4:0, 0:0, 1:1, 0:0, 5:1, 3:2)
- Kyiv derby: Dynamo-2 – CSKA-Borysfen (1994/5) (4:0, 1:3)
- Main Kyiv derby: Dynamo – CSKA/Arsenal (1995/6–2013/14, 2018/19) (2:1, 0:0, 1:0, 2:2, 1:0, 4:0, 4:0, 2:0, 3:0, 3:1, 5:1, 1:0, 1:0, 2:0, 1:0, 3:1, 6:1, 3:0, 0:0, 1:1, 2:0, 3:1, 1:0, 5:2, 1:0, 2:2, 3:0, 2:0, 3:1, 1:0, 3:2, 3:0, 1:0, 2:0, 4:0, 1:0, ~~2:0,~~ 4:0, 1:0)
- Kyiv derby: Obolon – CSKA[-2] (1995/6, 1999/0, 2001/2, 2005/6–2007/8) (0:0, 0:1, 2:1, 0:1, 3:1, 1:2, 2:1, 3:0, 3:2, 1:1, 1:1, 4:3)
- Kyiv derby: Dynamo-2 – Obolon (1999/0, 2001/2, 2005/6–2008/9, 2012/13, 2015/16) (4:1, 0:0, 1:2, 0:1, 1:3, 0:2, 2:0, 0:1, 1:0, 0:4, 1:0, 0:0, 2:1, +/-, 1:3, 0:2)
- Kyiv derby: Dynamo-3 – Obolon-2 (2001/2, 2003/4–2007/8) (3:2, 5:0, 1:2, 0:0, 3:1, 2:2, 1:1, 1:1, 3:0, 1:1, 2:1, 0:1)
- Kyiv derby: Dynamo – Obolon (2002/3–2004/5, 2009/10–2011/12) (1:1, 5:3, 4:0, 2:0, 7:0, 3:1, 4:0, 2:1, 2:2, 0:2, 4:0, 1:0)
- Kyiv derby: Arsenal – Obolon (2002/3–2004/5, 2009/10–2011/12, 2016/17, 2017/18) (2:0, 2:0, 2:1, 1:3, 1:0, 1:2, 4:1, 0:0, 1:0, 1:1, 4:1, 1:0, 2:1, 1:0, 1:1 (in Shchaslyve), 5:1)
- Kyiv derby: Obolon-2 – CSKA (2008/9) (0:2, -/+)

==== Lviv ====
- Lviv derby: DO – Spartak (1949) (1:3, 1:2)
- Lviv derby: SKA – Karpaty (1965–1969) (2:0, 3:0, 1:0, 0:1, 0:0, 1:2, 1:5, 1:4, 1:1, 1:2)
- Lviv derby: Dynamo – Karpaty-3[2] (1999/0–2001/2) (1:3, 0:1, 1:0, 3:0, 1:0, 0:1)
- Lviv derby: Dynamo – SKA-Orbita (2001/2) (4:0, 0:0)
- Lviv derby: Karpaty-3 – SKA-Orbita (2001/2) (1:1, 0:0)
- Main Lviv derby: Karpaty – Lviv (2008/9, 2018/19, 2019/20) (2:1, 4:2, 0:1, 1:1, 0:0, 0:0, 1:1, 1:1)
- Lviv derby: Karpaty-2 – Lviv-2 (2009/10) (2:0, 1:3)

(* Lviv derby: Karpaty – Shakhtar Donetsk (2014/15, 2015/16) (0:2, 2:2, 1:2, 0:3))

==== Luhansk ====
- Luhansk derby: Trudovi Rezervy – Dynamo (1949) (4:1, 2:1)
- Luhansk derby: Zoria – Shakhtar (2002/3) (2:1, 0:0)

==== Odesa ====
- Main Odesa derby: SKVO/SKA – Chornomorets (1959, 1961, 1962, 1964–1966) – Soviet Top League (Class A, Group 1) (1:0, 0:1, 0:0, 1:2, 0:2, 0:1, 2:1, 1:1, 0:2, 0:1, 1:0, 0:2)
- Odesa derby: Odesa – SKA-Lotto (1997/8) (2:0, 0:2)
- Odesa derby: Dynamo – SKA-Lotto (1997/8) (1:2, 0:1)
- Odesa derby: Odesa – Dynamo[-SKA] (1997/8, 1998/9) (3:0, 1:0, 8:0, +/-)
- Odesa derby: Palmira – Chornomorets-2 (2003/4) (1:2, 2:1)
- Odesa derby: Palmira – Real (2004/5) (1:1, 2:1)
- Odesa derby: Real Pharma – Zhemchuzhyna (2016/17) (1:1, 0:2)
- Odesa derby: Real Pharma – Chornomorets-2 (2019/20) (0:0, 0:3)

==== Poltava ====
- Poltava derby: Kolhospnyk – Lokomotyv (1960, 1961) (5:3, 1:3, 2:1, 2:0, 5:2)

==== Rivne ====
- Rivne derby: Kolhospnyk – Spartak (1960–1962) (1:0, 3:1, 2:1, 1:1, 6:0, 3:0)

==== Chernivtsi ====
- Chernivtsi derby: Avanhard – Spartak (1960) (3:0, 5:0)
- Chernivtsi derby: Avanhard – Mashynobudivnyk (1961) (1:0, 4:0)

==== Chernihiv ====
- Chernihiv derby: Desna – Zirka (1961) (6:0, 5:0)

==== Mykolaiv ====
- Mykolaiv derby: Sudnobudivnyk – Torpedo (1961) (1:1, 2:0)
- Mykolaiv derby: Sudnobudivnyk – Vympel (1962) (6:1, 2:0)
- Mykolaiv derby: Sudnobudivnyk – Mykolaiv-2 (2017/18) (2:2, 1:4, 1:3)

==== Ternopil ====
- Ternopil derby: Avanhard – Motor (1960) (1:1, 5:1)
- Main Ternopil derby: Nyva – Ternopil (2012/13, 2014/15, 2015/16) (1:0, 2:0, 1:0, 1:1, 2:2, 2:2, 0:1, -/+)

==== Vinnytsia ====
- Vinnytsia derby: Lokomotyv – Burevisnyk (1962) (4:0, 0:0)

==== Sumy ====
- Sumy derby: Avanhard – SVADKU (1962) (2:0, 3:1)
- Sumy derby: Sumy – Frunzenets-Liha (2001/2) (2:1, 2:1)

==== Zaporizhzhia ====
- Main Zaporizhzhia derby: Torpedo – Metalurh (1992-1997/8) (3:0, 1:0, 1:1, 1:3, 3:1, 0:4, 1:0, 0:2, 0:2, 0:4, 1:0, 1:1)
- Zaporizhzhia derby: Viktor – Metalurh-2 (1999/0) (1:1, 0:0)
- Zaporizhzhia derby: Torpedo – Metalurh-2 (2002/3) (1:1, 0:2)
- Zaporizhzhia derby: Metalurh – Zoria Luhansk (2014/15, 2015/16) (0:1, 0:3, 0:6, 1:4)

==== Donetsk ====
- Donetsk derby: Shakhtar-2 – Metalurh (1995/6) (2:0, 0:3)
- Main Donetsk derby: Shakhtar – Metalurh (1997/8–2013/14) (2:0, 2:1, 4:0, 4:2, 2:0, 3:2, 3:1, 3:0, 1:0, 3:1, 3:1, 2:0, 3:1, 2:0, 3:1, 3:0, 3:1, 2:0, 2:1, 0:0, 4:1, 1:0, 2:1, 1:1, 4:1, 1:0, 2:0, 2:0, 2:0, 2:0, 4:0, 4:0, 2:1, 2:2)
- Donetsk derby: Shakhtar-2 – Metalurh-2 (1997/8) (1:0, 1:2)
- Donetsk derby: Shakhtar-3 – Metalurh-2 (2001/2–2003/4) (3:1, 1:2, 1:0, 2:1, 4:2, 1:0)
- Donetsk derby: Shakhtar-3 – Olimpik (2004/5–2010/11) (2:0, 0:2, 0:2, 1:5, 3:1, 1:1, 1:2, 2:3, 1:1, 2:6, 0:0, 1:4, 1:3, 1:3)
- Donetsk derby: Titan – Olimpik (2007/8, 2008/9) (1:1, 0:3, 1:1, 0:2)
- Donetsk derby: Shakhtar-3 – Titan (2007/8, 2008/9) (2:2, 2:1, 3:2, 5:1)

==== Kremenchuk ====
- Kremenchuk derby: Kremin – Adoms (1999/0) (0:2, 0:4) (Second League Cup) (2:1, 1:0)

==== Ivano-Frankivsk ====
- Ivano-Frankivsk derby: Fakel – Chornohora (2004/5, 2005/6) (3:2, 1:1, 2:1, 1:0)

==== Zhytomyr ====
- Zhytomyr derby: Zhytychi – Zhytomyr (2005/6) (0:0, +/-)

==== Kryvyi Rih ====
- Kryvyi Rih derby: Hirnyk – Kryvbas-2 (2005/6) (2:0, 1:1)

==== Bila Tserkva ====
- Bila Tserkva derby: Arsenal – Ros (2008/9) (2:2, 1:1)

==== Crimea ====
- Crimea derby: Tavriya – Sevastopol (2010/11) (2:1, 1:0)

==== Oleksandria ====
- Oleksandria derby: Oleksandria – UkrAhroKom (2013/14) (2:1, 2:2)

==== Dnipro ====
- Dnipro derby: Dnipro – Dnipro-1 (2017/18) (2:0, 0:0, 1:2)
