= 2000 UEFA European Under-21 Championship qualification Group 4 =

Football tournament qualification stage

The teams competing in Group 4 of the 2000 UEFA European Under-21 Championship qualifying competition were France, Russia, Ukraine, Iceland and Armenia.

== Standings ==
Team	Pld	W	D	L	GF	GA	GD	Pts
France	8	6	1	1	18	4	+14	19
Russia	8	6	0	2	17	5	+12	18
Ukraine	8	3	2	3	16	12	+4	11
Iceland	8	2	0	6	9	18	−9	6
Armenia	8	1	1	6	6	27	−21	4

	(France)	(Russia)	(Ukraine)	(Iceland)	(Armenia)
France	—	2–0	4–0	2–0	3–1
Russia	2–1	—	2–0	3–0	6–0
Ukraine	0–0	1–0	—	5–1	8–0
Iceland	0–2	1–2	4–1	—	2–0
Armenia	1–4	0–2	1–1	3–1	—

== Matches ==
All times are CET.

4 September 1998
11:00

Ukraine	1 – 0	Russia
Dranov 23'	Report	(red card) 64' Temryukov

Stadion Dynamo im. Valeriy Lobanovskiy, Kyiv
5 September 1998
08:00

Iceland	0 – 2	France
	Report	Anelka 4'; Moreira 15'

Akranesvöllur, Akranes

10 October 1998
05:00

Armenia	3 – 1	Iceland
Tamoyan 2'; Hakobyan 8'; Amiryan 46'	Report	Guðjohnsen 62'

Gyumri City Stadium, Gyumri
10 October 1998
08:00

Russia	2 – 1	France
Tsaplin 64'; Laktionov 90'	Report	Cissé 21'

Lokomotiv Stadium, Moscow

13 October 1998
11:00

Ukraine	8 – 0	Armenia
Yashchuk 5'; Zubov 16', 81'; Venhlinskyi 42' (pen.); Vorobey 61'; Kotov 71'; Dranov 79'; Oliynyk 88'	Report

Stadion Dynamo im. Valeriy Lobanovskiy, Kyiv
14 October 1998
10:00

Iceland	1 – 2	Russia
Sigþórsson 75'	Report	Laktionov 9'; Gusev 61'

Kópavogsvöllur, Kópavogur

26 March 1999
14:30

France	4 – 0	Ukraine
Trezeguet 5', 43', 57', 65'	Report

Stade Charléty, Paris
27 March 1999
06:00

Armenia	0 – 2	Russia
	Report	Bezrodny 50'; Adiyev 82'

Gyumri City Stadium, Gyumri

30 March 1999
10:00

Ukraine	5 – 1	Iceland
Zubov 45'; Oliynyk 48'; Balytskyi 67'; Tymoshchuk 70'; Yashchuk 87'	Report	B. Guðjónsson 17'

Stadion Dynamo im. Valeriy Lobanovskiy, Kyiv
