= Yuriy Hetman =

Ukrainian footballer

Personal information
- Full name: Yuriy Oleksiyovych Hetman
- Date of birth: 27 January 1971 (age 55)
- Place of birth: Stepnoye, Russian SFSR
- Height: 1.68 m (5 ft 6 in)
- Position: Forward

Senior career*
Years	Team	Apps	(Gls)
1989	Zarya Voroshilovgrad	2	(0)
1991	SKA Kyiv	1	(0)
1992	Hirnyk Khartsyzk	16	(4)
1992	Metalurh Kostiantynivka	7	(0)
1992–1993	Nyva-Boryspil Myronivka	24	(9)
1993–1994	Nyva Myronivka	33	(4)
1994–1995	Dynamo Luhansk	39	(14)
1995–1997	Metalurh Mariupol	79	(37)
1999	Sintez Shymkent	19	(3)
2001	Yevropa Pryluky	3	(2)
2001	Shakhtar Luhansk	10	(4)
2001	Monolit Kostiantynivka	1	(1)
2002	Fakel Varva	3	(0)
2003	Cherkasy	15	(1)
- * Club domestic league appearances and goals

Yuriy Oleksiyovych Hetman (Ukrainian: Юрій Олексійович Гетьман; born 27 January 1971) is a former professional Ukrainian football forward.

== Career ==
Hetman and his brother, Oleksiy, played football for Ukrainian Second League side FC Dynamo Luhansk during the 1994–95 season.

Hetman became the second highest scorer after Oleksiy Antyukhin when he scored 21 goals for Metalurh Mariupol during the 1996–97 Ukrainian First League season.

He is the older brother of Oleksiy Hetman.
