= 1993–94 Ukrainian Transitional League =

Ukrainian Transitional League
- Season: 1993–94
- Champions: Sirius Zhovti Vody
- Relegated: Silur Shakhtarsk; Promin Sambor district Beskyd Nadvirna; Surozh Sudak; Elektron Romny; Medyk Morshyn
- Top goalscorer: 27 – V.Vanin (Sirius)

1993–94 Ukrainian Third League was the second season of the fourth level.

The season started on August 21, 1993, with the last games played on July 3, 1994. It was won by Sirius Zhovti Vody.

== Team change ==
For all relegated and promoted clubs it was a debuting season. FC Nyva Myronivka was officially another club from Karapyshi, Myronivka Raion that moved to Myronivka. Last season Nyva-Borysfen was reorganized and its promotion place was overtaken by a team of Boryspil which was originally sponsoring the Myronivka team.

=== Relegated team ===
Only one team was relegated from the 1992–93 Ukrainian Second League.

- CSK ZSU Kyiv – 18th (last) place (debut)

=== Promoted teams ===
Six group winners of 1992–93 Ukrainian Football Amateur League and three other teams

- Beskyd Nadvirna – winner of the Group 1 (debut)
- Khutrovyk Tysmenytsia – winner of the Group 2 (debut)
- Hart Borodianka – winner of the Group 3 (debut)
- Sirius Zhovti Vody – winner of the Group 4 (debut)
- Oskil Kupiansk – winner of the Group 5 (debut)
- Surozh Sudak – winner of the Group 6 (debut)
- Medyk Morshyn – admitted (debut)
- Viktor Zaporizhzhia – admitted (debut)
- FC Lviv – admitted (debut)

=== Reorganized teams ===
- Nyva Myronivka

== Final standings ==
| Pos | Team | Pld | W | D | L | GF | GA | GD | Pts | Promotion or relegation |
|---|---|---|---|---|---|---|---|---|---|---|
| 1 | Sirius Zhovti Vody (P) | 34 | 20 | 11 | 3 | 56 | 25 | +31 | 51 | Promoted to Second League |
| 2 | Frunzenets Saky (P) | 34 | 21 | 6 | 7 | 51 | 28 | +23 | 48 | Promoted to Second League |
| 3 | Viktor Zaporizhzhia (P) | 34 | 20 | 8 | 6 | 65 | 25 | +40 | 48 | Promoted to Second League |
| 4 | FC Lviv (P) | 34 | 20 | 8 | 6 | 57 | 33 | +24 | 48 | Promoted to Second League |
| 5 | Hart Borodianka | 34 | 18 | 11 | 5 | 52 | 16 | +36 | 47 | |
| 6 | Oskil Kupiansk | 34 | 15 | 6 | 13 | 52 | 52 | 0 | 36 | |
| 7 | Nyva Myronivka | 34 | 13 | 10 | 11 | 34 | 26 | +8 | 36 | |
| 8 | Torpedo Melitopol | 34 | 12 | 12 | 10 | 35 | 34 | +1 | 36 | |
| 9 | Khutrovyk Tysmenytsia | 34 | 13 | 7 | 14 | 43 | 41 | +2 | 33 | |
| 10 | Avanhard Zhydachiv | 34 | 12 | 9 | 13 | 38 | 44 | −6 | 33 | |
| 11 | CSK ZSU Kyiv | 34 | 14 | 4 | 16 | 45 | 42 | +3 | 32 | |
| 12 | Fetrovyk Khust | 34 | 13 | 5 | 16 | 33 | 49 | −16 | 31 | |
| 13 | Silur Khartsyzk (R) | 34 | 10 | 9 | 15 | 32 | 51 | −19 | 29 | Relegated to amateur league |
| 14 | Promin Sambor district (R) | 34 | 12 | 4 | 18 | 32 | 48 | −16 | 28 | Relegated to amateur league |
| 15 | Beskyd Nadvirna (R) | 34 | 12 | 3 | 19 | 32 | 59 | −27 | 27 | Relegated to amateur league |
| 16 | Surozh Sudak (R) | 34 | 9 | 8 | 17 | 38 | 51 | −13 | 26 | Relegated to amateur league |
| 17 | Elektron Romny (R) | 34 | 6 | 1 | 27 | 18 | 26 | −8 | 13 | Relegated to amateur league |
| 18 | Medyk Morshyn (R) | 34 | 3 | 4 | 27 | 14 | 77 | −63 | 10 | Relegated to amateur league |

(P) Promoted; (R) Relegated

Notes

- Frunzenets Saky moved to the district center (seat) Saky
- A club from the village of Karapyshi, Myronivka Raion moved to Myronivka and changed its name to Nyva
- Prometei Shakhtarsk changed its name to Silur Shakhtarsk
- Promin Sambor region is from the village of Volia Baranetska in Sambor district, Lviv region
- Electron withdrew from the league on May 5.

== Top scorers ==
- Volodymyr Vanin (Viktor) - 27 (8)
- Bohdan Bandura (Lviv) - 15
- Oleh Buhakov (Oskol) - 15
- Oleksandr Novikov (Surozh/Frunzenets) - 15 (4)
- Viktor Pobehayev (Hart) - 13 (3)
- Yuriy Martynov (Sirius) - 13 (4)
- Oleksandr Shemetyev (Frunzenets) - 13 (4)

== See also ==
- Ukrainian Second League 1993–94
- Ukrainian First League 1993–94
- Amateur championship 1993-1994
