= FC Medyk Morshyn =

Ukrainian football club

FC Medyk Morshyn was a Ukrainian football club from Morshyn, Lviv Oblast.

== League and cup history ==
| Season | Div. | Pos. | Pl. | W | D | L | GS | GA | P | Domestic Cup | Europe | | Notes |
|---|---|---|---|---|---|---|---|---|---|---|---|---|---|
| 1993–94 | 3rd (lower) | 18 | 34 | 3 | 4 | 27 | 15 | 78 | 11 | DNP | — | — | Relegated |
| 1994–95 | 4th | 6 | 26 | 9 | 4 | 11 | 28 | 40 | 31 | | — | — | |
| 1996–97 | 4th | 4 | 12 | 2 | 2 | 8 | 5 | 18 | 8 | | — | — | |

== See also ==
- FC Skala Morshyn
