= FC Dynamo Saky =

Ukrainian football club

FC Dynamo Saky (Futbol′nyy klub Dynamo Saky) was a Ukrainian football club from Saky, Crimea. The club was established in Saky raion under the name of Frunzenets.

== Team names ==
- until 1993: FC Frunzenets Frunze
- 1993–1994: FC Frunzenets Saky
- 1994–1997: FC Dynamo Saky

== League and cup history ==
=== Soviet Union ===
| Season | Div. | Pos. | Pl. | W | D | L | GS | GA | P | Domestic Cup | Europe | Notes |
|---|---|---|---|---|---|---|---|---|---|---|---|---|
| 1990 | 5th KFK Ukrainian SSR Gr. 5 | 5_{/16} | 30 | 13 | 11 | 6 | 44 | 25 | 37 | | | |
| 1991 | 5th KFK Ukrainian SSR Gr. 4 | 4_{/16} | 30 | 17 | 7 | 6 | 48 | 18 | 41 | | | Reorganization of competitions |

=== Ukraine ===
| Season | Div. | Pos. | Pl. | W | D | L | GS | GA | P | Domestic Cup | Europe | Notes |
|---|---|---|---|---|---|---|---|---|---|---|---|---|
| 1992–93 | 4th Transitional League | 7_{/18} | 34 | 13 | 11 | 10 | 48 | 29 | 37 | | | |
| 1993–94 | 4th Transitional League | 2_{/18} | 34 | 21 | 6 | 7 | 51 | 28 | 48 | 1/32 finals | | Promoted |
| 1994–95 | 3rd Second League | 4_{/22} | 42 | 25 | 5 | 12 | 62 | 33 | 80 | 1/32 finals | | |
| 1994–95 | 3rd Second League Gr. B | 10_{/21} | 38 | 17 | 8 | 13 | 42 | 36 | 59 | 1/32 finals | | |
| 1996–97 | 3rd Second League Gr. B | 16_{/17} | 32 | 8 | 8 | 16 | 23 | 43 | 32 | 1/16 finals | | Relegated |
| 1997–98 | 4th Amateur League Gr. 4 | 9_{/9} | 0 | 0 | 0 | 0 | 0 | 0 | 0 | | | Withdrew before seasons start |

== Honours ==
- Crimea championship (Soviet Lower League Tier)

1989
