= FC Ros Bila Tserkva =

Ros Bila Tserkva
- Full name: Football Club Ros Bila Tserkva
- Founded: 1983 (original club), 2015 (revived)
- Ground: Trudovi Rezervy
- Capacity: 13,500
- Chairman: Serhiy Chelnokov
- Manager: Ihor Khimanych
- League: Kyiv Oblast First League
- 2015: 4th

FC Ros Bila Tserkva is a Ukrainian amateur Association football club based in Bila Tserkva, Kyiv Oblast that was expelled from the professional league after the 2010–11 season.

The club was formed in 1983.

The club's best season was in the first year competing in independent Ukraine when they finished 4th in the Ukrainian First League Group A. Since then the club has been struggling and has had numerous name changes as they find sponsors to keep the club solvent and active.

The FC Ros Bila Tserkva home ground was Trudovi Rezervy.

Colours are white shirts, black shorts.

== Team names ==
Year	Name
1983–88	Dynamo Irpin
1988–92	Dynamo
1992–94	Ros
1994–95	Transimpleks-Ros
1996	Ros
1997	Domobudivnyk
1997–02	Rihonda
2002–	Ros

== League and cup history ==
Season	Div.	Pos.	Pl.	W	D	L	GS	GA	P	Domestic Cup	Europe	Notes
1992	2nd "B"	4	26	13	5	8	40	32	31	1/32 finals		
1992–93	2nd	21	42	10	15	17	40	48	35	1/32 finals		Relegated
1993–94	3rd	18	42	13	9	20	35	52	35	1/64 finals		
1994–95	3rd	14	42	14	7	21	41	63	49	1/64 finals		
1995–96	3rd	17	40	10	9	21	28	61	39	1/128 finals		
1996–97	3rd "A"	15	30	6	4	20	14	49	22	1/64 finals		
1997–98	3rd "B"	15	32	7	10	15	25	45	31	1/256 finals		
1998–99	3rd "B"	12	26	4	6	16	11	40	18	Did not enter		
1999-00	3rd "B"	10	26	10	2	14	33	47	32	1/16 finals Second League Cup		
2000–01	3rd "B"	5	28	16	2	10	34	27	50	1/32 finals Second League Cup		
2001–02	3rd "B"	8	34	15	6	13	39	45	51	1/128 finals		
2002–03	3rd "B"	10	30	11	6	13	24	32	39	1/32 finals		
2003–04	3rd "B"	13	30	9	9	12	26	38	36	1/32 finals		
2004–05	3rd "B"	6	26	12	3	11	28	33	39	1/32 finals		
2005–06	3rd "B"	15	28	5	7	16	26	45	22	1/32 finals		
2006–07	3rd "A"	7	28	13	4	11	36	32	43	Did not enter		
2007–08	3rd "A"	11	30	8	6	16	28	49	30	Did not enter		
2008–09	3rd "A"	10	32	12	8	12	38	38	44	1/64 finals		
2009–10	3rd "A"	7	20	6	3	11	18	30	21	1/64 finals		
2010–11	3rd "A"	11	22	3	2	17	20	58	8	1/64 finals		−3

== Managers ==
- Yevhen Zolotnytsky (1999) (playing coach)
- Vadym Lazorenko (1999-02)
- Ihor Khimanych (2002) (interim)
- Oleksandr Holokolosov (2002)
- Ihor Khimanych (2003–)
