= FC Nyva Myronivka =

FC Nyva Myronivka was a Ukrainian football club from Myronivka, Kyiv Oblast.

It entered the professional competitions for the 1992–93 Ukrainian Third League season as Nyva-Borysfen Myronivka. It was promoted as Borysfen to the 1993-94 Ukrainian Second League, changing its name to FC Boryspil. In the 1993–94 season, another Nyva Myronivka appeared and continued to play in lower leagues until the 1996–97 season.

== League and cup history ==
Season	Div.	Pos.	Pl.	W	D	L	GS	GA	P	Domestic cup	Europe	Notes
1991	4th	7	27	13	5	9	45	36	31			Group 2
mid-season 1992–93 merged with FC Borysfen Boryspil (created 9 March 1993)
1992–93	3rd (lower)	4	34	19	7	8	45	28	45			Promoted as FC Boryspil
club restarted as Nyva Karapyshi, later Nyva Myronivka
1993–94	3rd (lower)	7	34	13	10	11	34	26	36			
1994–95	3rd (lower)	2	42	30	8	4	65	17	98			
tier liquidated, club admitted to higher tier
1995–96	3rd	6	40	21	10	9	59	36	73			Relegated
1996–97	4th	5_{/6}	16	1	3	12	7	27	6			

== Managers ==
- 1992 – 1993: Volodymyr Kolomiets (Nyva-Borysfen Myronivka)
- 1994 – 1995: Pavlo Neverov (Nyva Karapyshi/Myronivka)
- 1995 – 1996: Volodymyr Spiridonov
- 1996: Viktor Ishchenko
- 1996 – 1997: Ivan Fliashko
