= 1987 KFK competitions (Ukraine) =

KFK competitions
- Season: 1987
- Champions: Dnipro Cherkasy

The 1987 KFK competitions in Ukraine were part of the 1987 Soviet KFK competitions that were conducted in the Soviet Union. It was 23rd season of the KFK in Ukraine since its introduction in 1964. The winner eventually qualified to the 1988 Soviet Second League.

== Group stage ==
=== Group 1 ===
Pos	Team	Pld	W	D	L	GF	GA	GD	Pts	Promotion
1	Prohres Berdychiv	14	9	2	3	27	13	+14	20	Qualified for Final
2	Naftovyk Dolyna	14	8	1	5	19	14	+5	17	
3	Sokil Haisyn	14	7	3	4	24	15	+9	17	
4	Burevisnyk Kamianets-Podilskyi	14	6	4	4	19	18	+1	16	
5	Nyva Berezhany	14	5	4	5	19	17	+2	14	
6	Zirka Lviv	14	4	4	6	17	12	+5	12	
7	Karpaty Storozhynets	14	3	3	8	8	29	−21	9	
8	Maiak Bohorodchany	14	1	3	10	11	26	−15	5	

Source: ukr-football.org.ua

=== Group 2 ===
Pos	Team	Pld	W	D	L	GF	GA	GD	Pts	Promotion
1	Pidshypnyk Lutsk	14	10	1	3	27	7	+20	21	Qualified for Final
2	Tsukrovyk Chortkiv	14	7	3	4	22	16	+6	17	
3	Kolos Kalush	14	7	2	5	17	11	+6	16	
4	Kolos Zastavne	14	7	1	6	16	16	0	15	
5	Tsementnyk Mykolaiv	14	6	2	6	15	17	−2	14	
6	Zirka Zhytomyr	14	5	4	5	21	21	0	14	
7	Izotop Kuznetsovsk	14	5	2	7	11	22	−11	12	
8	Kolos Serebria	14	1	1	12	14	35	−21	3	

Source: ukr-football.org.ua

=== Group 3 ===
Pos	Team	Pld	W	D	L	GF	GA	GD	Pts	Promotion
1	Dnipro Heronymivka	16	12	1	3	35	10	+25	25	Qualified for Final
2	Sula Lubny	16	9	4	3	18	13	+5	22	
3	Avtomobilist Sumy	16	9	2	5	30	18	+12	20	
4	Voskhod Kyiv	16	8	4	4	19	9	+10	20	
5	Papirnyk Malyn	16	6	4	6	15	13	+2	16	
6	Avanhard Lozova	16	5	2	9	14	23	−9	12	
7	Start Kharkiv	16	3	4	9	22	29	−7	10	
8	Refryzherator Fastiv	16	4	2	10	14	37	−23	10	
9	Yavir Krasnopillia	16	3	3	10	17	32	−15	9	

Source: ukr-football.org.ua

=== Group 4 ===
Pos	Team	Pld	W	D	L	GF	GA	GD	Pts	Promotion
1	Kremin Kremenchuk	16	13	2	1	47	13	+34	28	Qualified for Final
2	Radyst Kirovohrad	16	11	1	4	36	20	+16	23	
3	Budivelnyk Slavutych	16	9	3	4	31	20	+11	21	
4	Inhulets Kryvyi Rih	16	8	3	5	30	20	+10	19	
5	Naftovyk Pyriatyn	16	7	4	5	22	14	+8	18	
6	Bilshovyk Kyiv	16	3	4	9	14	27	−13	10	
7	Zorya Obukhiv	16	2	6	8	14	33	−19	10	
8	Temp Cherkasy	16	1	6	9	8	22	−14	8	
9	Lokomotyv Znamianka	16	2	3	11	9	42	−33	7	

Source: ukr-football.org.ua

=== Group 5 ===
Pos	Team	Pld	W	D	L	GF	GA	GD	Pts	Promotion
1	Dynamo Odesa	18	13	5	0	45	11	+34	31	Qualified for Final
2	Enerhiya Nova Kakhovka	18	12	2	4	43	22	+21	26	
3	Zirka Zhovtneve	18	11	1	6	41	24	+17	23	
4	Tytan Armyansk	18	8	5	5	21	13	+8	21	
5	Transformator Zaporizhia	18	6	4	8	18	23	−5	16	
6	Torpedo Melitopol	18	6	4	8	22	29	−7	16	
7	Kolos Osokorivka	18	6	4	8	20	36	−16	16	
8	Avanhard Ordzhonikidze	18	3	6	9	17	27	−10	12	
9	Sudnoremontnyk Illichivsk	18	3	6	9	17	31	−14	12	
10	Vodnyk Mykolaiv	18	3	1	14	17	45	−28	7	

Source: ukr-football.org.ua

=== Group 6 ===
Pos	Team	Pld	W	D	L	GF	GA	GD	Pts	Promotion
1	Metalurh Kupiansk	18	12	3	3	25	10	+15	27	Qualified for Final
2	Shakhtar Dzerzhynsk	18	11	4	3	28	9	+19	26	
3	Stakhanovets Stakhanov	18	12	1	5	27	16	+11	25	
4	Komunarets Komunarsk	18	9	1	8	22	22	0	19	
5	Pivdenstal Yenakiieve	18	8	3	7	19	25	−6	19	
6	Shakhtar Lutuhine	18	7	4	7	15	15	0	18	
7	Shakhtar Sverdlovsk	18	6	4	8	19	22	−3	16	
8	Tekstylnyk Donetsk	18	5	5	8	21	22	−1	15	
9	Azovstal Zhdanov	18	3	2	13	13	31	−18	8	
10	Bazhanovets Makiivka	18	1	5	12	9	36	−27	7	

Source: ukr-football.org.ua

== Final ==
The final was taking place in Zakarpattia Oblast (Khust and Vynohradiv).

Pos	Team	Pld	W	D	L	GF	GA	GD	Pts	Promotion
1	Dnipro Cherkasy	5	4	1	0	10	2	+8	9	Promoted (Second League)
2	Kremin Kremenchuk	5	4	0	1	12	4	+8	8	
3	Metalurh Kupyansk	5	2	1	2	6	7	−1	5	
4	Pidshypnyk Lutsk	5	1	2	2	2	4	−2	4	
5	Dynamo Odessa	5	1	1	3	4	9	−5	3	
6	Prohres Berdychiv	5	0	1	4	3	11	−8	1	

Source: ukr-football.org.ua

== See also ==
- 1987 Football Cup of Ukrainian SSR among KFK
