= FC Beskyd Nadvirna =

Ukrainian football club

FC Beskyd Nadvirna is amateur a Ukrainian football club from Nadvirna, Ivano-Frankivsk Oblast. The club played only one season on the non-amateur level. The name of the club is after one of the mountain ranges in the Eastern Carpathians.

== Overview ==
The club was created back in 1927 as Ukrainian club and played in lower leagues of the Lwow District League. Following the World War II and annexation of Western Ukraine (southern portion of the annexed Eastern Poland), the club was reestablished as a Soviet club Naftovyk Nadvirna.

In 1979 the club was renamed as Bystrytsia Nadvirna (under similar name in 1930s existed another Polish club). Following dissolution of the Soviet Union, the club returned to its historic name Beskyd.

== Honours ==
- Football championship of Ukraine among amateurs
  - Winners (1): 1992–93 (group 1)
- Ivano-Frankivsk Oblast Football Championship
  - Winners (3): 1963, 1965, 1988
  - Runners-up (7): 1952, 1962, 1964, 1966, 1967, 1970, 1999

== League and cup history ==
Season	Div.	Pos.	Pl.	W	D	L	GS	GA	P	Domestic Cup	Europe	Notes
1992–93	4th	1	24	18	5	1	48	15	41			Promoted
1993–94	3rd lower	15	34	12	3	19	32	59	27			Relegated
1994–95	4th	9	24	7	6	11	24	27	27			Withdrew
