= FC Halychyna Drohobych =

- Founded: 1989
- Ground: Stadion Halychyna
- Capacity: 8,000
- League: Lviv Oblast League
- 2021: 8th

FC Halychyna Drohobych (Ukrainian: Галичина (Дрогобич)) is an amateur football club from Drohobych, Ukraine. The club was created in place of SKA Karpaty Lviv and amateur club Avanhard Drohobych on December 2, 1989 as SFC Drohobych.

Drohobych appeared in the Ukrainian Cup in 1999-2000, when they made the 1/16 round, and 2000-01. In 2003 the club lost its professional status and competes in the Lviv Oblast Championship.

== History ==
The first Soviet clubs in Drohobych appeared soon after annexation of former Eastern Polish territories by the Soviet Union. As usual the best clubs that were established in the city like in many other cities were Dynamo and Spartak which dominated the football life until 1950.

In 1950 at the Oil Refinery Factory was established a team that eventually made its way to the all-Union level, Naftovyk Drohobych. With reorganization of the Soviet league and discontinuation of the Class B competitions, the team was disbanded. Sometime parallelly there existed another weaker team Dolotnyk Drohobych which represented another factory.

After Naftovyk was disbanded, in 1971 at the factory of road equipment cranes was established a new team which was named Avanhard at first and in 1972 renamed as Torpedo. With some breaks it existed until 1978.

In 1979 there was established yet another team Khimik Drohobych that in 1982 was renamed as Avanhard and existed until 1989.

The club was created earlier in 1989 as Naftovyk Drohobych on the decision of the Drohobych city municipality and its head coach was appointed Jose Turchyk, a native of Buenos-Aires, Argentina whose family moved to the Soviet Union in the 1950s.

== Competitions ==
=== Soviet Union ===
Season	Div.	Pos.	Pl.	W	D	L	GS	GA	P	Domestic Cup	Europe	Notes
1989	see SKA Karpaty Lviv											
1990	3rd "West"	14	50	18	13	19	54	55	49			
1991	3rd "West"	18	42	14	7	21	42	66	35			

=== Ukraine ===
Season	Div.	Pos.	Pl.	W	D	L	GS	GA	P	Domestic Cup	Europe	Notes
1992	2nd "A"	11	26	9	5	12	25	32	23	Q1 round		Relegated
1992–93	3rd	9	34	13	6	15	42	40	32	Q1 round		
1993–94	3rd	9	42	16	9	17	46	43	41	Q1 round		
1994–95	3rd	5	42	25	5	12	49	29	80	Q2 round		
1995–96	3rd "A"	14	40	16	8	16	39	40	56	2nd round		
1996–97	3rd "A"	6	30	12	10	8	34	27	46	Q3 round		
1997–98	3rd "A"	7	34	14	8	12	37	31	50	Q2 round		
1998–99	3rd "A"	10	28	9	7	12	29	37	34	Q1 round		
1999-00	3rd "A"	13	30	8	7	15	27	41	31	Second League		
2000–01	3rd "A"	14	30	6	6	18	29	48	24	Second League		
2001–02	3rd "A"	11	36	13	7	16	49	60	46	Q1 round		
2002–03	3rd "A"	15	28	5	7	16	22	39	46	1st round		Relegated
