= FC Oskil Kupiansk =

Ukrainian football club

Oskil Kupiansk was a Ukrainian football club from Kupiansk, Kharkiv Oblast.

== History ==
After winning the KFK 5th Zone (Eastern Ukraine) Amateur Championship in the 1992–93 season the club garnered the right to enter the Professional Leagues. The next season the club participated in the Ukrainian Third League. When the Ukrainian Third League was dissolved the club was promoted to the Ukrainian Second League Group B. Between 1995 and 2001 the club performed reasonably well, finishing in third place on three occasions.

In the 2001–02 the club fell on hard times financially and players left. The club was demoted to the amateur level but never recovered. The club ceased to exist in 2003.

== Seasons ==
Season	Div.	Pos.	Pl.	W	D	L	GS	GA	P	Domestic Cup	Europe	Notes
1993–94	4th	6	34	15	6	13	52	52	36	Did not enter		
1994–95	4th	5	42	25	5	12	50	32	80	1/128 finals		Promoted
1995–96	3rd "B"	4	38	21	7	10	45	28	70	1/32 finals		
1996–97	3rd "B"	3	32	15	10	7	38	23	55	1/16 finals		
1997–98	3rd "C"	4	30	16	5	9	35	28	53	1/32 finals		
1998–99	3rd "C"	3	26	14	7	5	38	20	49	1/128 finals		
1999-00	3rd "C"	7	26	12	6	8	29	17	42	1/32 finals Second League Cup		
2000–01	3rd "C"	3	30	16	8	6	40	24	56	1/16 finals Second League Cup		
2001–02	3rd "C"	18	34	6	7	21	28	54	25	2nd Round		Relegated
2003	Club is dissolved											
