= FC Surozh Sudak =

Association football club from Crimea

FC Surozh Sudak (Futbol′nyy klub Surozh Sudak) was an amateur football club from Sudak, Crimea.

== Description and history ==
The club's name is an obsolete version of the city in the Ruthenian language. As a club, it existed until 2007. After its liquidation, the club's academy still delegates junior teams in Ukrainian youth competitions. Before FC Surozh participated in Ukrainian competitions of lower leagues and among amateurs. The club was champion of the Crimea Football Championship at least twice in 1992 and 1996/97.

In 1992–93 as the only representative from Crimea, Surozh participated in the Ukrainian competitions among KFK (fitness clubs) and earned a promotion to the Transitional League (later the Third League). During that season the club played its home games in a settlement Zolote Pole that is located further inland in the Kirovske Raion.

Its first game at a professional level, the club played on 31 August 1992 in Kyiv against FC CSKA Kyiv (at that time CSK ZSU Kyiv). The first season at a professional level was not successful and the club was relegated to amateurs.

The 1994–95 season FC Surozh participated in the competition of KFK. After failing to obtain promotion, the club withdrew from national amateur competitions and concentrated on the regional competitions in Crimea.

== League and cup history ==
=== Soviet Union ===
Season	Div.	Pos.	Pl.	W	D	L	GS	GA	P	Domestic Cup	Europe	Notes
1991	5th KFK Ukrainian SSR Gr. 4	5_{/16}	30	14	11	5	65	20	39			Reorganization of competitions

=== Ukraine ===
Season	Div.	Pos.	Pl.	W	D	L	GS	GA	P	Domestic Cup	Europe	Notes
1992–93	5th Amateur League Gr. 6	1_{/14}	26	20	4	2	56	13	44			Promoted
1993–94	4th Transitional League	16_{/18}	34	9	8	17	38	51	26			Relegated
1994–95	5th Amateur League Gr. 6	4_{/17}	32	21	1	10	30	21	64			
...
2002	5th Crimean Championship	15_{/18}	34	8	6	20	36	58	30			
2003	5th Crimean Championship	15_{/15}	28	3	1	24	12	86	10			
...
2007	5th Crimean Championship	10_{/13}	24	5	3	16	25	52	18			

=== Crimea ===
Season	Div.	Pos.	Pl.	W	D	L	GS	GA	P	Domestic Cup	Europe	Notes
2015–16	2nd Open Championship	14_{/16}	22	1	0	21	10	86	3			Withdrew, defunct

== Notable players ==
- Yuriy Mikhaylus

== Honours ==
- Crimea championship (Ukrainian Lower League Tier)

1992, 1996/97
