= FC Enerhiya Pivdennoukrainsk =

- Full name: FC Enerhiya Pivdennoukrainsk
- Founded: 1994
- Dissolved: 2008
- League: Druha Liha A
- 2007–08: 12th

FC Enerhiya Pivdennoukrainsk was a Ukrainian football club based in Pivdennoukrainsk, Mykolaiv oblast. The former name for the club was "Olimpiya FC AES". The club was renamed prior to the 2005–06 season.

== History ==
The club gained its professional status in 1995 when it joined Druha Liha when it merged with FC Artania Ochakiv. The club stayed in Pivdennoukrainsk. The club's logo implies that it has some relation to the local nuclear power plant (South Ukraine Nuclear Power Plant).

After the 2007–2008 season, the club citing lack of funds from its sponsors did not submit a license and the PFL removed the club from the Professional Ranks. The club has indicated that they will reapply to the PFL for the 2009–10 season.

Colours are yellow shirts and shorts.

Original Emblem Olympia FC AEC

== League and cup history ==
Season	Div.	Pos.	Pl.	W	D	L	GS	GA	P	Domestic Cup	Europe	Notes
1995–96	3rd "A"	16	40	12	7	21	34	67	43	1/64 finals		
1996–97	3rd "B"	12	32	9	12	11	25	33	39	1/64 finals		
1997–98	3rd "B"	5	32	13	6	13	33	41	45	1/128 finals		
1998–99	3rd "B"	6	26	11	4	11	25	31	37	1/128 finals		
1999-00	3rd "B"	13	26	5	5	16	19	34	20	1/16 finals Second League Cup		
2000–01	3rd "B"	9	28	10	4	14	21	33	34	1/8 finals Second League Cup		
2001–02	3rd "B"	14	34	9	11	14	28	41	38	1st round		
2002–03	3rd "B"	8	30	12	4	14	41	41	40	1/32 finals		
2003–04	3rd "B"	7	30	12	5	13	34	41	41	1/32 finals		
2004–05	3rd "B"	14	26	1	8	17	7	32	11	1/32 finals		
2005–06	3rd "B"	12	28	6	8	14	29	45	26	1/32 finals		Renamed
2006–07	3rd "A"	9	28	10	7	11	33	30	37	Did not Enter		
2007–08	3rd "A"	12	30	7	9	14	22	47	30	1/64 finals		withdrew
