= FC HU ZIDMU-Spartak Zaporizhzhia =

Ukrainian football club from Zaporizhzhia

FC HU ZIDMU-Spartak Zaporizhzhia was a Ukrainian football club from Zaporizhzhia.

== Brief overview ==
Until 2000, the club was known as Viktor Zaporizhzhia. The club represents the Classic Private University that before 2007 was called the Humanitarian University of Zaporizhzhia State and Municipal Administration (HU ZIDMU).

Initially, the club carried the name of the university's rector Viktor Oharenko who became the club's main sponsor, hence Viktor Zaporizhzhia. The club was organized by a coach from Belarus Oleksandr Tomakh. The new team was formed out of players of Metalurh Zaporizhzhia academy. Viktor played its games at the older "Lokomotyv" stadium. Its first head coach of Vladyslav Ishchenko. After being admitted to the Transitional League in 1993, Ishchenko was replaced by Russian head coach Boris Stukalov. Its first game in the league the club played on 21 August 1993 in Borodianka.

In 1994 the main club of the region FC Metalurh Zaporizhzhia experienced crisis and to save situation Oleksandr Tomakh joined Metalurh at first as part of merger. It was planned to rename the club as FC Metalurh-Viktor Zaporizhzhia, but the merger fell through.

== League and cup history ==
=== Viktor Zaporizhzhia ===
Season	Div.	Pos.	Pl.	W	D	L	GS	GA	P	Domestic Cup	Europe	Notes
1993–94	3rd "lower"	3	34	20	8	6	65	25	48			promoted
1994–95	3rd	17	42	12	6	24	54	60	42			
1995–96	3rd	8	38	19	5	14	54	34	62			
1996–97	3rd	8	32	12	8	12	46	48	44			
1997–98	3rd	6	32	12	7	13	41	38	43			
1998–99	3rd	10	26	10	5	11	24	36	35			
1999–00	3rd	14	26	3	6	17	15	49	15			

=== HU ZIDMU-Spartak Zaporizhzhia ===
Season	Div.	Pos.	Pl.	W	D	L	GS	GA	P	Domestic Cup	Europe	Notes
2004	4th	3	6	1	2	3	8	12	5			
2004	4th	5	8	1	1	6	9	20	4			
2005	4th	3	8	3	3	2	9	13	12			
2005	4th	5	4	0	0	4	4	16	0			

== See also ==
- FC Torpedo Zaporizhzhia
