= 1998–99 Ukrainian Second League =

Ukrainian Second League
- Season: 1998–99
- Champions: Zakarpattia Uzhhorod (A); Odesa (B); Obolon-PPO Kyiv (C)
- Relegated: 9 withdrew, 10 refused
- Top goalscorer: 24 - Serhiy Shevtsov (Krystal Kherson)

The 1998–99 Ukrainian Second League was the eighth season of 3rd level professional football in Ukraine. The competitions were divided into three groups – A, B, and C.

== Group A ==
=== Promoted teams ===
- Enerhetyk Burshtyn - Winner of the Amateur League (debut)

=== Relegated teams ===
- Verkhovyna Uzhhorod - Placed 20th in the First League (returning, last time as Zakarpattia Uzhhorod in 1990 (Soviet Union))

=== Withdrawn teams ===
Before the season

- Berkut Bedevlya, Tysmenytsia, Karpaty Mukacheve refused to participate

During and after the season

- Krystal and Haray left the competition after the first half.

=== Renamed teams ===
- On November 7, 1998 Verkhovyna Uzhhorod had their name changed to Zakarpattia.

=== Location map ===
Locations of team home grounds in Ukrainian Second League 1992-93

=== Standings ===
Pos	Team	Pld	W	D	L	GF	GA	GD	Pts	Promotion or relegation
1	Zakarpattia Uzhhorod (C, P)	28	20	6	2	48	14	+34	66	Promoted to First League
2	Borysfen Boryspil	28	17	7	4	37	10	+27	58	
3	Tsementnyk-Khorda Mykolaiv	28	16	5	7	31	24	+7	53	
4	Hazovyk Komarno	28	15	5	8	41	25	+16	50	
5	Dynamo-3 Kyiv	28	13	7	8	30	26	+4	46	
6	Papirnyk Malyn	28	13	7	8	35	26	+9	46	
7	Systema-Boreks Borodianka (Note: The game Naftovyk - Systema-Boreks 2:1 was annulled and a technical loss (-:+) was awarded to the home team.)	28	13	7	8	22	20	+2	46	
8	Karpaty-2 Lviv	28	11	6	11	30	40	−10	39	
9	Naftovyk Dolyna	28	11	6	11	22	23	−1	39	
10	Halychyna Drohobych	28	9	7	12	29	37	−8	34	
11	Enerhetyk Burshtyn	28	9	7	12	23	30	−7	34	
12	Kalush	28	6	8	14	20	45	−25	26	
13	Veres Rivne (Note: Veres Rivne, Krystal Chortkiv and Haray Zhovkva were deducted six points as punishment for not paying their spring league fees on time.)	28	6	3	19	13	50	−37	15	
14	Krystal Chortkiv (D)	28	5	1	22	14	18	−4	10	Withdrew
15	Haray Zhovkva (D)	28	2	4	22	9	16	−7	4	Withdrew

Source: uafootball.net.ua
(C) Champions; (D) Disqualified; (P) Promoted

== Results ==
Home \ Away	ZAK	BOR	TKM	HZV	D3K	PMA	IBO	K3L	NDO	HDR	EBU	KAL	VER	KRY	HZH
Zakarpattia Uzhhorod	—	2–1	3–0	2–0	2–0	3–1	0–0	2–0	4–1	1–0	0–0	2–0	3–0	+/-	+/-
Borysfen Boryspil	0–0	—	5–0	2–1	0–0	2–1	0–1	6–0	0–0	2–0	1–0	2–0	4–0	3–0	+/-
Tsementnyk-Khorda Mykolaiv	2–1	1–0	—	1–0	3–0	3–0	1–2	2–0	0–0	1–0	2–0	2–0	3–0	+/-	1–0
Hazovyk Komarno	2–3	0–0	1–1	—	0–1	2–1	2–0	3–1	1–0	6–2	1–0	1–1	4–0	+/-	2–0
Dynamo-3 Kyiv	1–1	1–1	1–2	1–3	—	0–1	2–0	1–2	0–0	3–1	1–0	0–0	3–0	1–0	2–1
Papirnyk Malyn	2–0	0–1	4–1	2–1	0–3	—	0–0	2–0	1–0	2–0	0–0	3–1	4–0	3–1	+/-
Systema-Boreks Borodianka	1–1	0–1	1–0	0–2	1–2	0–0	—	1–1	2–0	0–0	3–1	2–0	1–0	+/-	1–0
Karpaty-2 Lviv	1–1	0–0	1–2	3–2	1–0	0–0	2–0	—	2–1	1–2	3–1	2–2	1–2	+/-	+/-
Naftovyk Dolyna	0–3	0–1	0–0	0–0	4–1	3–1	-/+	0–2	—	4–2	0–0	2–1	1–0	1–0	+/-
Halychyna Drohobych	1–2	0–1	0–0	3–1	0–2	2–2	1–1	2–1	1–0	—	5–0	2–1	0–0	1–1	+/-
Enerhetyk Burshtyn	0–1	2–0	0–0	1–3	1–1	0–0	2–0	4–1	1–0	3–0	—	2–3	1–0	+/-	2–3
Kalush	0–3	0–2	3–2	0–0	2–2	0–3	0–2	1–1	0–2	1–0	0–0	—	0–0	+/-	2–1
Veres Rivne	0–5	0–1	0–1	0–2	0–1	3–2	0–2	1–2	0–2	0–3	1–2	3–1	—	2–0	1–1
Krystal Chortkiv	1–2	-/+	2–0	0–1	-/+	-/+	2–1	2–1	-/+	-/+	1–0	4–1	-/+	—	-/-
Haray Zhovkva	0–1	1–1	-/+	-/+	-/+	0–0	-/+	0–1	0–1	1–1	-/+	-/+	-/+	1–0	—

Source: uafootball.net.ua
Legend: Blue = home team win; Yellow = draw; Red = away team win.

== Group B ==
=== Team changes ===
Kryvbas-2 Kryvyi Rih obtained the professional status and entered the Second League.

Slavutych-ChAES Slavutych, Fakel Varva refused to participate.

SKA-Lotto Odesa was replaced with Dynamo Odesa and renamed into Dynamo-SKA Odesa.

=== Location map ===
Locations of team home grounds in Ukrainian Second League 1992-93

=== Standings ===
Pos	Team	Pld	W	D	L	GF	GA	GD	Pts	Promotion or relegation
1	SC Odesa (C, P)	26	22	2	2	73	13	+60	68	Promoted to First League
2	Krystal Kherson	26	20	2	4	55	25	+30	62	
3	Kryvbas-2 Kryvyi Rih	26	17	4	5	46	16	+30	55	
4	Hirnyk-Sport Komsomolsk	26	13	6	7	36	31	+5	45	
5	Portovyk Illichivsk	26	11	8	7	33	31	+2	41	
6	Olimpia Yuzhnoukrainsk	26	11	4	11	25	31	−6	37	
7	Torpedo Melitopol	26	10	7	9	27	35	−8	37	
8	Chornomorets Sevastopol	26	9	9	8	27	25	+2	36 (Note: Chornomorets finished ahead of Tytan on head-to-head points: Tytan 1–1 Chornomorets, Chornomorets 4–0 Tytan.)	
9	Tytan Armiansk	26	10	6	10	31	38	−7	36	
10	Viktor Zaporizhzhia	26	10	5	11	24	36	−12	35	
11	Zirka-2 Kirovohrad	26	8	4	14	14	38	−24	28	
12	Ryhonda Bila Tserkva	26	4	6	16	11	40	−29	18	
13	Fortuna Sharhorod (Note: Fortuna Sharhorod was disqualified after first part of the season.) (D)	26	1	2	23	5	26	−21	5	Expelled
14	Dynamo-SKA Odesa (Note: Dynamo-SKA Odesa was deducted six points as punishment for not paying their spring league fees on time and was disqualified after first part of the season.) (D)	26	1	3	22	5	27	−22	0	Expelled
15	Lokomotyv Smila (Note: Lokomotyv Smila and Nyva Bershad withdrew during first part of the season (Round 7), their results were annulled.) (D)	0	0	0	0	0	0	0	0	Withdrew
16	Nyva Bershad (D)	0	0	0	0	0	0	0	0	Withdrew

Source: RSSSF
(C) Champions; (D) Disqualified; (P) Promoted
Notes:

The game Fortuna - Dynamo-SKA 3:3 was annulled and awarded a technical loss (-:+) to the home team for cheating.

== Results ==
Home \ Away	ODE	KRK	K2K	HIS	PIL	YZH	OLM	SEV	TAR	VZA	Z2K	ROS	FSH	DDO
SC Odesa	—	3–0	1–0	2–2	3–1	2–0	6–0	3–0	3–0	4–0	2–0	1–0	6–0	+/-
Krystal Kherson	2–1	—	4–0	3–2	5–1	3–0	3–0	2–1	4–2	6–0	1–0	2–1	2–0	3–0
Kryvbas-2 Kryvyi Rih	0–2	3–0	—	5–1	2–0	0–0	2–1	4–0	1–1	3–1	7–0	5–0	+/-	+/-
Hirnyk-Sport Komsomolsk	1–4	1–2	0–3	—	3–1	2–0	2–2	1–0	6–1	1–0	2–1	1–0	+/-	3–0
Portovyk Illichivsk	1–4	3–3	1–1	0–0	—	2–0	0–0	1–1	2–0	2–0	3–0	4–1	+/-	2–0
Olimpia Yuzhnoukrainsk	2–2	2–1	1–2	0–3	1–0	—	2–0	1–2	0–3	1–1	0–2	1–0	3–0	+/-
Torpedo Melitopol	1–4	3–0	2–0	1–1	1–2	2–0	—	1–1	1–0	1–2	4–0	0–0	+/-	1–0
Chornomorets Sevastopol	0–1	0–2	1–0	0–0	2–2	1–2	4–1	—	4–0	0–2	2–0	0–0	5–0	+/-
Tytan Armiansk	2–0	1–1	0–2	1–1	0–1	1–0	5–3	1–1	—	7–3	1–0	2–0	2–1	+/-
Viktor Zaporizhzhia	0–3	0–1	0–1	3–0	1–0	0–2	0–0	0–0	2–0	—	3–1	4–1	+/-	1–0
Zirka-2 Kirovohrad	0–3	0–1	0–1	1–0	2–2	0–3	0–0	0–0	1–0	1–0	—	1–2	2–0	1–0
Ryhonda Bila Tserkva	1–5	1–4	0–0	0–1	0–1	0–2	1–2	0–1	0–0	0–0	1–1	—	+/-	+/-
Fortuna Sharhorod	-/+	-/+	0–2	1–2	1–1	-/+	-/+	-/+	-/+	1–1	-/+	1–0	—	-/+
Dynamo-SKA Odesa	0–8	-/+	0–2	-/+	-/+	2–2	-/+	1–1	1–1	-/+	-/+	1–2	-/-	—

Source: uafootball.net.ua
Legend: Blue = home team win; Yellow = draw; Red = away team win.

== Group C ==
=== Team changes ===
Avanhard Rovenky, Zorya Luhansk, Khimik Severodonetsk participated previously in the First League.

VPS Kramatorsk, Metalurh-2 Zaporizhzhia, Shakhtar Horlivka, Dalis Komyshuvakha obtained the professional status and entered the Second League.

Khimik Severodonetsk, Dalis Komyshuvakha, Metalurh-2 Donetsk, Slovianets Konotop, Pivdenstal Yenakieve refused to participate.

=== Location map ===
Locations of team home grounds in Ukrainian Second League 1992-93

=== Standings ===
Pos	Team	Pld	W	D	L	GF	GA	GD	Pts	Promotion or relegation
1	Obolon-PPO Kyiv (C, P)	26	20	4	2	45	18	+27	64	Promoted to First League
2	Zorya Luhansk	26	18	2	6	55	17	+38	56	
3	Oskil Kupyansk	26	14	7	5	38	20	+18	49	
4	Metalist-2 Kharkiv	26	15	3	8	26	19	+7	48	
5	Vorskla-2 Poltava	26	15	2	9	33	34	−1	47 (Note: Vorskla-2 finished ahead of Elektron on head-to-head points: Elektron 3–2 Vorskla-2, Vorskla-2 3–0 Elektron.)	
6	Elektron Romny	26	14	5	7	22	23	−1	47	
7	Dnipro-2 Dnipropetrovsk	26	13	5	8	22	23	−1	44	
8	Metalurh-2 Zaporizhzhia	26	11	6	9	30	33	−3	39	
9	Avanhard Rovenky	26	11	2	13	17	39	−22	35	
10	Myrhorod	26	8	4	14	13	27	−14	28	
11	Shakhtar Horlivka (Note: Shakhtar Horlivka RSSSF show number of goals scored as 28, Ukrainian season page shows 18.)	26	8	3	15	18	39	−21	27	
12	Metalurh Novomoskovsk (Note: Metalurh Novomoskovsk, Shakhtar Stakhanov and VPS Kramatorsk were deducted six points as punishment for not paying their league fees.) (D)	26	5	2	19	26	17	+9	11	Withdrew
13	Shakhtar Stakhanov (D)	26	2	1	23	5	25	−20	1	Withdrew
14	VPS Kramatorsk (D)	26	1	2	23	4	20	−16	−1	Withdrew

Source: RSSSF
(C) Champions; (D) Disqualified; (P) Promoted

== Results ==
Home \ Away	OBK	ZOR	OKU	M2K	V2P	ERO	D2D	M2Z	AVR	MRH	SHO	MNO	SST	VKR
Obolon-PPO Kyiv	—	2–1	0–0	2–1	2–0	2–1	4–1	2–1	4–0	1–0	3–2	4–0	+/-	2–0
Zorya Luhansk	2–0	—	3–1	3–0	6–0	4–0	4–1	1–1	4–1	4–0	3–1	2–0	+/-	6–0
Oskil Kupyansk	1–2	0–1	—	3–0	2–0	1–1	1–2	5–2	2–1	1–0	6–2	+/-	4–0	+/-
Metalist-2 Kharkiv	1–1	1–0	0–0	—	2–0	3–1	1–0	1–0	4–0	1–0	4–2	2–1	+/-	+/-
Vorskla-2 Poltava	0–3	3–0	2–1	1–0	—	3–0	2–1	2–1	0–2	1–0	7–2	0–5	2–0	+/-
Elektron Romny	0–1	1–0	1–1	1–0	3–2	—	2–0	0–0	2–0	1–1	1–0	+/-	+/-	1–0
Dnipro-2 Dnipropetrovsk	0–0	0–0	1–1	1–0	1–2	1–0	—	2–0	1–0	2–1	1–0	3–1	+/-	+/-
Metalurh-2 Zaporizhzhia	6–2	3–1	1–1	1–1	1–3	2–1	0–2	—	4–2	1–0	0–0	+/-	1–0	+/-
Avanhard Rovenky	0–5	0–2	0–2	1–0	1–1	1–2	1–1	1–2	—	1–0	1–0	+/-	1–0	+/-
Myrhorod	1–1	1–0	0–0	0–1	0–1	1–2	2–0	2–0	0–1	—	2–1	+/-	1–2	1–0
Shakhtar Horlivka	0–1	0–2	0–1	0–2	1–0	0–0	1–0	3–0	0–1	0–0	—	+/-	1–0	2–0
Metalurh Novomoskovsk	-/+	-/+	1–3	-/+	-/+	-/+	-/+	1–1	3–0	5–0	4–0	—	4–1	-/-
Shakhtar Stakhanov	0–2	1–6	-/+	1–0	-/+	0–1	0–0	-/+	-/+	-/+	-/+	-/+	—	0–2
VPS Kramatorsk	-/+	-/+	0–1	0–1	1–1	-/+	0–1	0–2	0–1	-/+	-/+	1–1	-/-	—

Source: uafootball.net.ua
Legend: Blue = home team win; Yellow = draw; Red = away team win.

Druha Liha 1998-99 winners
Zakarpattia Uzhhorod
1st title

Druha Liha 1998-99 winners
SC Odesa
1st title

Druha Liha 1998-99 winners
Obolon-PPO Kyiv
1st title

== See also ==
- 1998–99 Ukrainian Premier League
- 1998–99 Ukrainian First League
- 1998–99 Ukrainian Football Amateur League
- 1999 Ukrainian Football Amateur League
