= Serhiy Dranov =

Ukrainian association football player

Personal information
- Full name: Serhiy Gennadyevich Dranov
- Date of birth: 1 September 1977 (age 49)
- Place of birth: Sevastopol, Crimean Oblast, Ukrainian SSR, Soviet Union
- Position: Striker

Senior career*
Years	Team	Apps	(Gls)
1993–1994	Chayka Sevastopol	46	(6)
1995–1999	Shakhtar Donetsk	15	(4)
1995–1998	→ Shakhtar-2 Donetsk	58	(43)
1998	→ Stal Alchevsk (loan)	1	(0)
1998	→ Mykolaiv (loan)	10	(2)
1999	→ Dnipro Dnipropetrovsk (loan)	6	(1)
1999–2003	Metalurh Donetsk	67	(14)
2001–2002	→ Metalurh-2 Donetsk	13	(4)
2004–2005	Kryvbas Kryvyi Rih	13	(6)
2005	→ Kryvbas-2 Kryvyi Rih	12	(5)
- * Club domestic league appearances and goals

Serhiy Gennadyevich Dranov (Russian: Сергей Дранов; born 1 September 1977) is a Ukrainian football manager and former footballer who manages the Crimea national football team.

== Early life ==
Dranov was born and raised in Sevastopol, Crimea, and started playing football at a young age with his father.

== Club career ==
In 1995, he signed for Ukrainian side Shakhtar Donetsk. After that, Ukrainian side Metalurh Donetsk, where he was regarded aș one of the club's most important players during the end of the 1990s and the early 2000s. Altogether, he made over 100 appearances in the Ukrainian Premier League.

== International career ==
Dranov represented Ukraine internationally at youth level and was regarded as a Ukraine prospect.

== Style of play ==
Dranov was regarded as having a reputation as a non-prolific striker.

== Managerial career ==
After retiring from professional football, Dranov worked as a manager.
