= 1993–94 Ukrainian Second League =

Ukrainian Second League
- Season: 1993–94
- Dates: 17 August 1993 to 2 July 1994
- Champions: Boryspil
- Runner up: Bazhanovets Makiivka
- Relegated: Dnister Zalischyky; Shakhtar Stakhanov
- Top goalscorer: 20 - Viktor D'iak (Bazhanovets Makiivka)

The 1993–94 Ukrainian Second League was the third season of 3rd level professional football in Ukraine.

== Teams ==
=== Relegated teams ===
- Ros Bila Tserkva - (debut)
- Shakhtar Pavlohrad - (debut)

=== Promoted teams ===
- Naftokhimik Kremenchuk - winner of the Third League (debut)
- Dynamo Luhansk - runner-up of the Third League (debut)
- Nyva-Borysfen Boryspil - fourth in the Third League (debut)
- Metalurh Kerch placed fifth in the Third League (returning after a year of absence)
- Shakhtar Shakhtarsk - sixth in the Third League (returning after a year of absence)

=== Renamed teams ===
- Prior to the season Nyva-Borysfen Myronivka was renamed into Borysfen Boryspil first and then simply Boryspil;
- During the season Zirka Kirovohrad was renamed into Zirka-NIBAS Kirovohrad
- During the season Shakhtar Shakhtarsk was renamed into Medita Shakhtarsk
- During the season Shakhtar-2 Donetsk was renamed into Metalurh Kostiantynivka
- During the season Voikovets Kerch was renamed into Metalurh Kerch
- During the season Vahonobudivnyk Stakhanov was renamed into Shakhtar Shtakhanov

=== Relocated teams ===
- Before the season Druzhba Berdyansk moved from the neighboring Osypenko, Berdyansk Raion to Berdyansk city.

=== Location map ===
Locations of team home grounds in Ukrainian Second League 1992-93

== Standing table ==
Pos	Team	Pld	W	D	L	GF	GA	GD	Pts	Promotion or relegation
1	Boryspil (C, P)	42	26	13	3	84	28	+56	65	Promoted to First League
2	Bazhanovets Makiivka (P)	42	25	7	10	83	44	+39	57	Promoted to First League
3	Zirka-NIBAS Kirovohrad (P)	42	25	7	10	60	41	+19	57	Promoted to First League
4	Naftokhimik Kremenchuk (P)	42	24	7	11	69	41	+28	55	Promoted to First League
5	Yavir Krasnopillia	42	22	10	10	63	35	+28	54	
6	Meliorator Kakhovka	42	18	12	12	56	37	+19	48	
7	Dynamo Luhansk	42	16	16	10	47	40	+7	48	
8	Medita Shakhtarsk	42	18	6	18	50	41	+9	42	
9	Halychyna Drohobych	42	16	9	17	46	43	+3	41	
10	Druzhba Berdiansk	42	14	12	16	42	60	−18	40	
11	Chornomorets-2 Odesa	42	16	7	19	42	55	−13	39	
12	Azovets Mariupol	42	16	7	19	43	58	−15	39	
13	Tavriya Kherson	42	13	13	16	44	49	−5	39	
14	Tytan Armyansk	42	13	12	17	47	38	+9	38	
15	Chaika Sevastopol	42	14	9	19	49	60	−11	37	
16	Hazovyk Komarne	42	13	11	18	43	46	−3	37	
17	Metalurh Kostiantynivka	42	13	9	20	41	58	−17	35	
18	Ros Bila Tserkva	42	13	9	20	35	52	−17	35	
19	Metalurh Kerch	42	12	11	19	50	69	−19	35	
20	Shakhtar Pavlohrad	42	9	12	21	29	58	−29	30	
21	Dnister Zalischyky (R)	42	10	9	23	29	62	−33	29	Relegated to Third League
22	Shakhtar Stakhanov (R)	42	9	6	27	33	70	−37	24	Relegated to Third League

Source: uafootball.net.ua
(C) Champions; (P) Promoted; (R) Relegated

=== Top goalscorers ===
	Scorer	Goals (Pen.)	Team
1	Viktor Dyak	21 (1)	Bazhanovets Makiivka
2	Vasyl Karpin	20 (1)	Halychyna Drohobych
3	Volodymyr Fedorov	18 (1)	Bazhanovets Makiivka
4	Oleksandr Barabash	15 (1)	Metalurh Kostiantynivka
5	Oleksandr Liskovets	14 (2)	Zirka-NIBAS Kirovohrad
5	Vasyl Shved	14 (2)	Hazovyk Komarno

Druha Liha 1993-94 winners
FC Boryspil
1st title

== Number of teams by region ==
Number	Region	Team(s)
4	Donetsk Oblast	Azovets Mariupol, Bazhanovets Makiivka, Medita Shakhtarsk, Metalurh Kostiantynivka
3	Autonomous Republic of Crimea	Chaika Sevastopol, Metalurh Kerch, Tytan Armyansk
2	Kherson Oblast	Krystal Kherson, Meliorator Kakhovka
2	Kyiv Oblast	FC Boryspil, Ros Bila Tserkva
2	Luhansk Oblast	Dynamo Luhansk, Shakhtar Stakhanov
2	Lviv Oblast	Halychyna Drohobych, Hazovyk Komarno
1	Dnipropetrovsk Oblast	Shakhtar Pavlohrad
1	Kirovohrad Oblast	Zirka Kirovohrad
1	Odesa Oblast	Chornomorets-2 Odesa
1	Poltava Oblast	Naftokhimik Kremenchuk
1	Sumy Oblast	Yavir Krasnopillia
1	Ternopil Oblast	Dnister Zalishchyky
1	Zaporizhia Oblast	Druzhba Berdiansk

== See also ==
- Ukrainian First League 1993-94
- Ukrainian Third League 1993-94
- 1993-94 Ukrainian Cup
