= FC Dynamo Luhansk =

Ukrainian football club

FC Dynamo Luhansk was a Ukrainian football team based in Luhansk.

== History ==
FC Dynamo Luhansk was founded between the 1920s–1930s. The club began its legacy in the Soviet football competitions and by the 1950s lost its professional status. Dozen years later it folded. The club played its games in the Lenin Memorial Stadium. In 1991 it was resurrected and with the independence of Ukraine, FC Dinamo Luhansk joined the Ukrainian football competitions. The club played its games in third and second leagues in the stadium of "Avantguard". In 1995 it merged with FC Metalurh Mariupol.

== League and cup history ==
Season	Div.	Pl.	G	W	D	L	Goals	Pts	Cup	Lost to	Notes
1992–93	4	2	34	19	12	3	65–32	50	1/32 finals	FC Khimik Severodonetsk (D-2) 3:4 (away)	joined League; promoted
1993–94	3	7	42	16	16	10	47–40	48			
1994–95	3	3	42	26	5	11	72–47	83	1/64 finals	FC Khimik Severodonetsk (D-2) 3:3 (p.k. 1–2) (home)	failed promotion; merged with FC Metalurh Mariupol
