= FC Avanhard Zhovti Vody =

Ukrainian football club

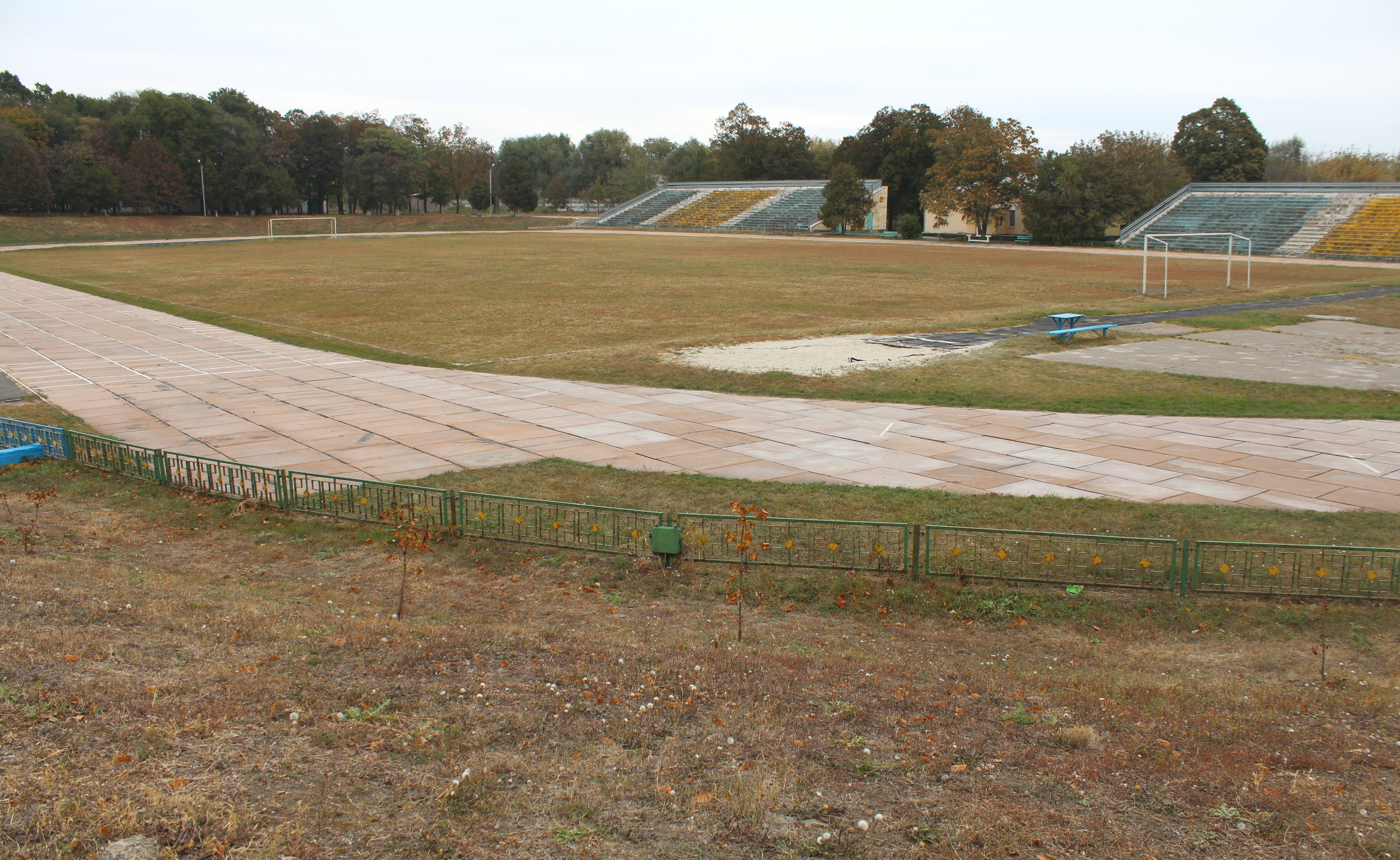
Avanhard Stadium

FC Avanhard Zhovti Vody is a Ukrainian amateur football club from Zhovti Vody, Dnipropetrovsk Oblast.

In 1959–70 as Avanhard the club participated in the championship of the Ukrainian SSR among teams of masters (professional). Since 1993 it was known as Sirius and in 1994 moved to Kryvyi Rih. In 1995 Sirius was merged with a local amateur team Sportinvest Kryvyi Rih which replaced Sirius in competition for year. In 1996 the club folded. It was replaced by Nyva Bershad. In 2010 was the club refounded.

== League and cup history ==
Season	Div.	Pos.	Pl.	W	D	L	GS	GA	P	Domestic Cup	Europe	Notes

== Coaches ==
- 1992–1993 Vladimir Spiridonov
- 1993 Mykola Fedorenko
- 1994–1995 Mykhailo Palamarchuk (interim, playing coach)
- 1995 Yuriy Ustynov
- 1995 Vladimir Brukhti

== See also ==
- FC Hirnyk Kryvyi Rih
- FC Nyva Bershad
