= 2019–20 Ukrainian Football Amateur League =

Ukrainian Amateur Football Championship
- Season: 2019–20
- Champions: Viktoriya Mykolaivka (2nd title) Epitsentr Dunaivtsi (losing finalist)
- Promoted: 7 – Chernihiv, Dnipro, Karpaty, Peremoha, Rubikon, Yarud, Epitsentr
- All statistics correct as of 16 August 2020.

The 2019–20 Ukrainian Amateur Football Championship season was the 24th since it replaced the competition of physical culture clubs.

On 1 July 2018, the AAFU published information about the upcoming season with a tentative composition which was finalized on 15 July 2019.

== Summary ==
Due to the COVID-19 pandemic, the spring half was suspended to summer. On 7 June 2020, there took place the AAFU conference which among other issues also discussed reorganization of the organization. A couple months before that on 31 March 2020 in car accident died the president of AAFU Fedir Shpyh.

On 17 June 2020, there appeared information that it is the final day for clubs to confirm their participation in continuation of the AAFU competitions, which could be resumed on 27 June 2020.

On 22 June 2020, there appeared information about that the season will be resumed on 27 June 2020 and finished with some changes to the regulations. Due to extensive pause in the competition, at least 10 teams withdrew.

== Teams ==
=== Relegated professional clubs ===
- Zirka Kropyvnytskyi – 15th place (withdrew) in the 2018–19 Ukrainian First League (returning, last played season in 2007)

=== Returning/reformed clubs ===
- FC Chernihiv (returning, last played season in 2017–18)
- Dnipro Cherkasy (returning, last played season in 2003 as FC Cherkasy)
- Epitsentr Dunayivtsi (returning, last played season in 2010 as Verest Dunayivtsi)
- Kovel-Volyn Kovel (returning, last played season in 2016–17)
- Nyva Terebovlia (returning, last played season in 2017–18)

=== Debut ===
List of teams that are debuting this season in the league.

- Atlet Kyiv
- Lehioner Dnipro
- Votrans Lutsk
- Bila Tserkva
- LSTM No.536 Lutsk
- FC Vovchansk
- Dnipro-1-Borysfen
- Svitanok-Ahrosvit Shlyakhova
- Kremin-Yuniors Kremenchuk.
- FC Trostianets

=== Withdrawn teams ===
List of clubs that took part in last year competition, but chose not to participate in 2019–20 season:

- Avanhard Bziv
- Chaika Vyshhorod
- FC Dnipro
- Druzhba Kryvyi Rih
- Fakel Lypovets
- SC Khmelnytskyi
- Krystal Chortkiv
- FC Kryvyi Rih
- Skoruk Tomakivka
- FC Ternopil

Clubs that did not play last season in the league, but showed interest at first yet withdrew before the start of the season:

- Praid Tokmak
- Ahronyva Zavodske
- Tavria-Skif Rozdol

List of clubs that withdrew during the season:

- FC Malynsk

=== Merged teams / Name change ===
- On 2 March 2020 during midseason winter recession, it became known that FC Chernihiv is merging with FC Avanhard Koryukivka in order to participate next season in the Second League. The united team would be finishing the second half of the 2019–20 season in amateurs. The AAFU allowed the merged club to keep its second team without purging it.
- On 1 March 2020 FC Trostianets-2 change its name to FC Trostianets.
- On 19 June 2020 FC Rubikon-Vyshneve Kyiv change its name to FC Rubikon Kyiv.
- On 19 June 2020 FC Chernihiv change its name to FC Chernihiv-YuSB.
- On 19 June 2020 Avanhard Koriukivka change its name to FC Chernihiv-Avanhard Koriukivka.

=== Location map ===
The following displays the location of teams.

Location of prospective teams in the 2019–20 Ukrainian Amateur League

=== Stadiums ===
Group A

Team	Stadium	Position in 2018–19
~~Malynsk~~	~~Lion Stadium~~	Am1, 1st
Pokuttia	Yunist Stadium	Am1, 2nd
ODEK	ODEK Stadium	Am1, 3rd
Karpaty	Kolos Stadium Enerhetyk Stadium (Burshtyn)	Am1, 4th
Ahron	Velyki Hayi Stadium	Am1, 5th
Epitsentr	Tovtry Stadium (Chemerivtsi) Zernovyk Stadium Podillia Stadium (Vasylkivtsi)	Reg
Kovel-Volyn	Tsentralnyi Stadium	Reg
LSTM 536	Knyahynok Stadium	Reg
Nyva	Kolos Stadium	Reg
Svitanok-Ahrosvit	Shlyakhova Arena	Reg
Votrans	Pidhaitsi Stadium	Reg

Group B

Team	Stadium	Position in 2018–19
LNZ	LNZ-Arena	Am2, 1st
Viktoriya	Viktoriya Stadium	Am2, 2nd
Pervomaisk	Tsentralnyi Stadium	Am2, 6th
Ahrodim	Kolos Stadium	Am2, 8th
Avanhard K.	KFTP Stadium Chernihiv Arena	Am2, 9th
Rubikon	Miskyi Stadium (Vyshneve) Atlet Stadium	Am2, 10th
Olimpik	Zirka Stadium Zmina Stadium (Bila Tserkva) Shyshka Stadium (Oleksandrivka)	Am2, 11th
Atlet	DYuSSh Atlet Stadium	Reg
Bila Tserkva	Zmina Stadium	Reg
Chernihiv	Chernihiv Arena	Reg
Dnipro	Tsentralnyi Stadium	Reg
Trostianets	Kuts Stadium Naftovyk Stadium (Okhtyrka)	Reg

Group C

Team	Stadium	Position in 2018–19
Zirka	Zirka Stadium	1L, 15th w/d
Tavriya	Pulyayev Start Stadium Marianivskyi Stadium	Am3, 2nd
Motor	Motor Sich Stadium	Am3, 3rd
Kakhovka	Olimpiyskyi Stadium	Am3, 4th
Peremoha	Olimpiyski rezervy Stadium Molodizhnyi Park	Am3, 6th
Yarud	Azovets Stadium Zakhidnyi Stadium	Am3, 9th
Dnipro/Borysfen	Olimpiyski rezervy Stadium	Reg
Kremin-Yuniors	Kremin Arena Kredmash Stadium	Reg
Lehioner	Olimpiyski rezervy Stadium Molodizhnyi Park	Reg
Vovchansk	Sonyachnyi Stadium (Kharkiv) Aggregate Factory Stadium	Reg

Notes:

- Reg — regional championship (Regions of Ukraine)
- Am[#] — AAFU championship where sign (#) indicates Group number
- 1L — PFL First League championship

== Group stage ==
=== Group 1 ===
Pos	Team	Pld	W	D	L	GF	GA	GD	Pts	Promotion, qualification or relegation
1	ODEK Orzhiv (C)	18	15	2	1	45	15	+30	47	Qualification to second stage
2	Epitsentr Dunayivtsi (P)	18	12	3	3	36	20	+16	39	Qualification to second stage Admission to Ukrainian Second League
3	Ahron Velyki Hayi	18	8	7	3	19	22	−3	31	
4	Karpaty-Enerhetyk Halych (P)	18	6	4	8	15	31	−16	22	Admission to Ukrainian Second League
5	Svitanok-Ahrosvit Shlyakhova (X)	18	6	1	11	18	12	+6	19 (Note: Head-to-head points, goals difference and goals scored: Svitanok-Ahrosvit 6, +4, 6; LSTM 536 5, -2, 4; Votrans 5, -2, 2)	Withdrawn
6	LSTM 536 (X)	18	5	4	9	22	36	−14	19	Withdrawn before next season
7	Votrans Lutsk	18	5	4	9	12	20	−8	19	
8	Nyva Terebovlia	18	4	4	10	14	16	−2	16	Withdrawn, but returned for next season
9	Pokuttia Kolomyia (X)	18	4	1	13	14	17	−3	13 (Note: Head-to-head points: Pokuttia 3; Kovel 0)	Withdrawn
10	Kovel-Volyn Kovel (X)	18	3	4	11	8	14	−6	13	Withdrawn
–	FC Malynsk (X)	1	1	0	0	4	2	+2	3	Results annulled

Source: http://www.aafu.org.ua/
Rules for classification: 1) Points; 2) Head-to-head points; 3) Head-to-head goal difference; 4) Head-to-head higher number of goals scored; 5) Goal difference; 6) Higher number of goals scored; 9) draw of lots.
(C) Champions; (P) Admission to the 2020–21 Ukrainian Second League; (X) Withdrew
Notes:

=== Group 2 ===
Pos	Team	Pld	W	D	L	GF	GA	GD	Pts	Promotion, qualification or relegation
1	Viktoriya Mykolaivka (C)	22	18	3	1	59	12	+47	57	Qualification to second stage
2	FC LNZ-Lebedyn	22	17	4	1	54	13	+41	55	Qualification to second stage
3	Chernihiv-Avanhard Koryukivka (X)	22	14	3	5	32	17	+15	45	Qualification to second state withdrew before next season
4	FC Trostianets	22	11	4	7	30	30	0	37	
5	FC Chernihiv (P)	22	9	7	6	30	23	+7	34	Admission to Ukrainian Second League
6	Rubikon Kyiv (P)	22	8	7	7	25	36	−11	31	Admission to Ukrainian Second League
7	Atlet Kyiv	22	8	3	11	32	45	−13	27	
8	FC Bila Tserkva	22	5	6	11	18	32	−14	21 (Note: Head-to-head goal difference: Bila Tserkva +1; Dnipro -1)	
9	Dnipro Cherkasy (P)	22	6	3	13	22	48	−26	21	Admission to Ukrainian Second League
10	MFC Pervomaisk	22	5	2	15	26	31	−5	17	Withdrawn, but returned for next season
11	Ahrodim Bakhmach (X)	22	4	4	14	9	13	−4	16	Withdrawn
12	Olimpik Kropyvnytskyi (X)	22	2	0	20	19	56	−37	6	Withdrawn

Source: http://www.aafu.org.ua/
Rules for classification: 1) Points; 2) Head-to-head points; 3) Head-to-head goal difference; 4) Head-to-head higher number of goals scored; 5) Goal difference; 6) Higher number of goals scored; 9) draw of lots.
(C) Champions; (P) Admission to the 2020–21 Ukrainian Second League; (X) Withdrew
Notes:

=== Group 3 ===
Pos	Team	Pld	W	D	L	GF	GA	GD	Pts	Promotion, qualification or relegation
1	Tavriya Novotroitske (C, X)	18	14	0	4	29	13	+16	42 (Note: Head-to-head points: Tavriya 6 pts; Vovchansk 0 pts)	Qualification to second state withdrew before next season
2	FC Vovchansk	18	13	3	2	38	11	+27	42	Qualification to second stage
3	Motor Zaporizhzhia	18	13	1	4	27	9	+18	40	Qualification to second stage
4	Yarud Mariupol (P)	18	12	3	3	37	14	+23	39	Admission to Ukrainian Second League
5	SC Kakhovka	18	10	3	5	32	24	+8	33	
6	Zirka Kropyvnytskyi	18	9	3	6	30	19	+11	30	
7	Peremoha Dnipro (P)	18	3	2	13	9	42	−33	11	Admission to Ukrainian Second League
8	Lehioner Dnipro	18	2	1	15	15	31	−16	7	Withdrawn, but returned for next season
9	Dnipro-1 Borysfen	18	1	1	16	3	24	−21	4 (Note: Head-to-head points: Dnipro-1 3 pts; Kremin-Yuniors 0 pts)	Withdrawn, but returned for next season
10	Kremin-Yunior Kremenchuk (X)	18	1	1	16	9	42	−33	4	Withdrawn

Source: http://www.aafu.org.ua/
Rules for classification: 1) Points; 2) Head-to-head points; 3) Head-to-head goal difference; 4) Head-to-head higher number of goals scored; 5) Goal difference; 6) Higher number of goals scored; 9) draw of lots.
(C) Champions; (P) Admission to the 2020–21 Ukrainian Second League; (X) Withdrew
Notes:

Notes

- On 8 August 2019 the Ukrainian Association of Football announced that Peremoha was stripped of 9 tournament points in the 2019–20 season. However, the AAFU official standing did not reflect that fact and no mentioning about the decision either.
- The game between Dnipro-1-Borysfen and Motor on 28 September 2019 did not take place, possible due to fact that a team of medics did not arrive to the game. Later the standings were adjusted where it was reflected that Motor received technical victory (3:0) and Dnipro technical loss (0:3).
- During the weekend October 5–6, 2019 two more scheduled games failed to take place Vovchansk – Peremoha (5 October) and Motor – Zirka (6 October). Both games were granted on 7 October 2019 technical scores by AAFU with wins awarded to hosting teams in both games.
- Please, note that sum of wins in the table is lower than sum of losses because in games between withdrawn clubs that did not take place both received loss.

== Second stage ==
Following ease of quarantine restrictions, on 22 June 2020 it was announced that the competition will be resumed on 27 June 2020. It was decided to finish the first stage of competition consisting of three groups as planned, however for the second stage it was decided to replace play-off format with another group stage final mini-tournament consisting of two groups of 4 each and taking place in one place. The second stage is expected to take place in early August and will also include the final game. On 28 July 2020 the AAFU approved the format for the final (second) stage which would be as a single-elimination tournament with a single leg. The first games are expected to take place on 9 August 2020 with the draw for semifinals taking place the next day on 10 August. The final game will take place at the Viktor Bannikov Educational and Training Field in Kyiv.

On 6 August 2020 it was announced that the new season is expected to start on 29 August 2020, while registration to participate in competitions on 10 August 2020. The Ukrainian Amateur Cup is being planned to start on September 9–16, 2020.

=== Teams qualified ===
In parentheses are indicated number of times the club qualified for this phase.

- Group 1: ODEK Orzhiv (3), Epitsentr Dunayivtsi
- Group 2: Viktoriya Mykolaivka (3), LNZ-Lebedyn (2), Chernihiv-Avanhard
- Group 3: Tavriya Novotroitske (2), FC Vovchansk, Motor Zaporizhia (2)

=== Quarterfinals ===
Team 1	Score	Team 2
ODEK Orzhiv	6 – 0	Chernihiv-Avanhard
Viktoriya Mykolaivka	2 – 0	Motor Zaporizhzhia
Tavriya Novotroitske	0 – 1	LNZ-Lebedyn
FC Vovchansk	1 – 4	Epitsentr Dunaivtsi

9 August 2019	ODEK Orzhiv	6–0	Chernihiv-Avanhard	Orzhiv, Rivne Oblast
17:00	Hayduchyk 21' (pen.); Koshka 46'; Krasnomovets 54'; Bohdanov 84'; Tarhoniy 85'	Report		Stadium: ODEK Stadium; Referee: Ivan Mandziuk (Ternopil Oblast)

9 August 2019	Viktoriya Mykolaivka	2–0	Motor Zaporizhzhia	Mykolaivka, Sumy Oblast
17:00	Arzhanov (penalty missed) 45'; Cherednychenko 59'; Akimov 87'	Report		Stadium: Viktoriya Stadium; Referee: Andriy Fedoruk (Kyiv Oblast)

9 August 2019	Tavriya Novotroitske	0–1	LNZ-Lebedyn	Novotroyitske, Kherson Oblast
17:00		Report	Machulenko 67'	Stadium: Marianivskyi Stadium; Referee: Denys Fedan (Oleksandriya)

9 August 2019	FC Vovchansk	1–4	Epitsentr Dunaivtsi	Vysokyi, Kharkiv Oblast
17:00	Anwuli 45'; Pokosenko (yellow card) 51' (yellow-red card) 90+3'	Report	Claudinei 18'; Plis 50'; Ratsa 70'; Cherchenko 90+2'	Stadium: Metalist training base Referee: Andriy Zaitsev (Sloviansk)

- Notes: Vovchansk received home turf advantage earning 42 points in 18 games, while Epitsentr 39 points in 18 games (see the group stage standings above and the 2019–20 AAFU playoffs format).

=== Semifinals ===
The semifinal pairs will be drawn on 10 August 2020, participants of which are planned to meet on 13 August 2020.

Team 1	Score	Team 2
Viktoriya Mykolaivka	2 – 1	ODEK Orzhiv
Epitsentr Dunaivtsi	4 – 1	LNZ-Lebedyn

13 August 2019	Viktoriya Mykolaivka	2–1	ODEK Orzhiv	Mykolaivka, Sumy Oblast
	Arzhanov 6'; Akimov 90+5'	Report	Naumets 20'	Stadium: Viktoriya Stadium; Referee: Oleksandr Sadovyi (Kremenchuk)

13 August 2019	Epitsentr Dunaivtsi	4–1	LNZ-Lebedyn	Dunaivtsi, Khmelnytskyi Oblast
	Claudinei 57', 64'; Ratsa 61'; Ivashko 78'	Report	Lystopad 90+4'	Stadium: Kolos Stadium; Referee: Ihor Sadkovskyi (Terebovlia)

=== Finals ===
The final is planned to take place on 16 August 2020.

Team 1	Score	Team 2
Viktoriya Mykolaivka	4 – 4 (3–1 p)	Epitsentr Dunaivtsi

16 August 2019	Viktoriya Mykolaivka	4–4 (a.e.t.) (3–1 p)	Epitsentr Dunaivtsi	Kyiv
	Kuzmin 26', 64'; Mykhaylyuk 89'; Bezyazychnyi 105'	Report	Claudinei 5', 30'; Ratsa 90+1'; Ivashko 112'	Stadium: Viktor Bannikov Educational and Training Complex; Referee: Oleksandr Sakhno (Kyiv Oblast)

== Promotions to the Second League ==
In a preliminary list, there were 10 contenders for promotion to the Professional Football League competitions (announced on 12 November 2019): Zirka Kropyvnytskyi, Yarud Mariupol, Peremoha Dnipro, Trostianets-2, Dnipro Cherkasy, Rubikon Vyshneve, ODEK Orzhiv, Epitsentr Dunayivtsi, Munkach Mukacheve, Kovel-Volyn.

As of 24 December 2019, ten clubs have sent the applications for Second League license: FC Zirka Kropyvnytskyi, FC Yarud Mariupol, FC Peremoha Dnipro, FC Academiya Sportu Trostianets, MSC Dnipro Cherkasy, FC Vyshneve, FC Vovchansk, FC Avanhard Koryukivka, FC Karpaty Burshtyn, FC Bila Tserkva.

On 5 August 2020, there became publicized a list of ten main contenders to be promoted to the Second League, Dnipro Cherkasy, Yarud Mariupol, Chernihiv-Avanhard, FC Trostianets, FC Bila Tserkva, Peremoha Dnipro, Epitsentr Dunayivtsi, Rubikon Kyiv, Karpaty Halych, Metall Kharkiv.

== Number of teams by region ==
Number	Region	Team(s)
3	Chernihiv Oblast	FC Chernihiv, Avanhard Kryukivka, Ahrodim Bakhmach
3	Dnipropetrovsk Oblast	Dnirpo-1-Borysfen, Lehioner Dnipro, Peremoha Dnipro
3	Volyn Oblast	FC Kovel, LSTM Lutsk, Votrans Lutsk
2	Cherkasy Oblast	Dnipro Cherkasy, LNZ Lebedyn
2	Ivano-Frankivsk Oblast	Karpaty Halych, Pokuttia Kolomyia
2	Kherson Oblast	SC Kakhovka, Tavriya Novotroitske
2	Kirovohrad Oblast	Olimpik Kropyvnytskyi, Zirka Kropyvnytskyi
2	Kyiv	Atlet, Rubikon
2	Rivne Oblast	ODEK Orzhiv, FC Malynsk
2	Sumy Oblast	FC Trostianets, Viktoriya Mykolaivka
2	Ternopil Oblast	Ahron Velyki Hayi, Nyva Terebovlya
1	Donetsk Oblast	Yarud Mariupol
1	Kharkiv Oblast	FC Vovchansk
1	Khmelnytskyi Oblast	Epitsentr Dunaivtsi
1	Kyiv Oblast	FC Bila Tserkva
1	Mykolaiv Oblast	MFC Pervomaisk
1	Poltava Oblast	Kremin-Yunior Kremenchuk
1	Vinnytsia Oblast	Svitanok-Ahrosvit Shlyakhova
1	Zaporizhia Oblast	Motor Zaporizhia

== See also ==
- 2019–20 Ukrainian Amateur Cup
- 2019–20 Ukrainian Second League
- 2019–20 Ukrainian First League
- 2019–20 Ukrainian Premier League
