= 2018–19 Ukrainian Football Amateur League =

Ukrainian Football Amateur League
- Season: 2018–19
- Champions: VPK-Ahro Shevchenkivka (1st title) Viktoriya Mykolaivka (losing finalist)
- Promoted: 4 – VPK-Ahro, Alians, Dinaz, Uzhhorod
- Relegated: 12 teams (withdrawn)
- Top goalscorer: 21 – Mykhaylo Kolomoyets VPK-Ahro Shevchenkivka
- All statistics correct as of 12 June 2019.

The 2018–19 Ukrainian Football Amateur League season was the 23rd since it replaced the competition of physical culture clubs.

On 23 June 2018, the AAFU on its website published information about the conference in which theyAFU pnedans to adopt its decision about the upcoming season including championship and cup competitions. The AAFU also provided a preliminary list of clubs that expressed their interest in the 2018-19 competitions. The format of the upcoming season was adopted at a conference on 29 June 2018.

== Teams ==
=== Relegated professional clubs ===
- FC Dnipro – 8th place in the 2017–18 Ukrainian Second League Group B (returning for the first time since 1950)

=== Returning/reformed clubs ===
- Dinaz Vyshhorod (returning, last played season in 2011)
- SC Khmelnytskyi (reformed from last season during which was known as FC Khmelnytskyi)
- Kolos Askania-Nova (returning, last played season in 2016 as Kolos Khlibodarivka)
- VPK-Ahro Shevchenkivka (returning, last played season in 2015)

=== Debut ===
List of teams that are debuting this season in the league.

- Ahrodim Bakhmach
- Chaika Vyshhorod
- FC Kryvyi Rih
- Skoruk Tomakivka
- Ahron Velyki Hayi
- FC Halych
- LNZ-Lebedyn (Note: the club's administration announced that the club won't participate)
- FC Uzhhorod
- Alians Lypova Dolyna
- Kobra Kharkiv, (Note: a club with the same name already plays in the First League previously being merged with FC Helios Kharkiv)
- Motor Zaporizhzhia
- Avanhard Bziv
- Kobra Ostroh
- Peremoha Dnipro

=== Withdrawn teams ===
List of clubs that took part in last year competition, but chose not to participate in 2018–19 season:

- FC Chernihiv
- Tavria-Skif Rozdol
- Yednist Plysky

List of clubs that withdrew during the season:

- Kobra Ostroh, was withdrawn and its record annulled. Kobra played six games tying only once and losing the rest with goals record of one goal scored and 22 allowed.
- Kobra Kharkiv was excluded from the number of participants of the championship according with decision of AAFU CDC #10 of 16 November 2018. In games of spring portion of competition to all opponents of Kobra Kharkiv will be awarded technical victories +:–. Kobra Kharkiv withdrew in beginning of November 2018 and played 11 games, losing all of them and in three already were awarded technical losses.
- On 15 March 2019 Rochyn Sosnivka announced that it withdraws from competitions of the AAFU. At the moment of withdrawal Rochyn had following record +5=2–4 (19–12).
- After 3 May 2019 Kolos Askania-Nova withdrew from competitions.

=== Location map ===
The following displays the location of teams.

Location of prospective teams in the 2018–19 Ukrainian Amateur League

=== Stadiums ===
Group A

Team	Stadium	Position in 2017–18
Ternopil	Topilche Stadium	2L, w/d
Rochyn	Shkilnyi Stadium	Am1, 2nd
ODEK	ODEK Stadium	Am1, 3rd
Pokuttia	Yunist Stadium	Am1, 4th
Malynsk	Lion Stadium	Am1, 6th
Khmelnytskyi	Sport Complex Podillya	Am1, 8th
Krystal	Kharchovyk Stadium	Am1, 9th
Ahron	Stadium	Reg
Karpaty	Kolos Stadium	Reg
Kobra	Ostroh Academy Stadium	Reg
Uzhhorod	Avtomobilist Stadium	Reg

Group B

Team	Stadium	Position in 2017–18
Viktoriya	Viktoriya Stadium	Am2, 1st
Fakel	Kolos Stadium	Am2, 3rd
Avanhard K.	Paperovyk Stadium	Am2, 6th
Rubikon	Miskyi Stadium	Am2, 8th
Pervomaisk	Tsentralnyi Stadium	Am3, 8th
Olimpik	Zirka Stadium (training)	Am3, 9th
Ahrodim	Kolos Stadium	Reg
Alians	Okipnyi Stadium^{(1)}	Reg
Avanhard B.	Prohres Stadium^{(2)}	Reg
Chaika	Enerhetyk Stadium	Reg
Dinaz	Dinaz Stadium^{(3)}	Reg
LNZ	LNZ-Arena	Reg

Group C

Team	Stadium	Position in 2017–18
Dnipro	Dnipro Arena	2L, 8th
Druzhba	Hirnyk Stadium^{(3)}	Am3, 1st
Kakhovka	Olimpiyskyi Stadium	Am3, 6th
Yarud	Azovets Stadium	Am2, 7th
Kobra	Sonyachny Stadium	Reg
Kolos	Askania Arena	Reg
Kryvyi Rih	Budivelnyk Stadium	Reg
Motor	Motor Sich Stadium	Reg
Peremoha	Olimpiyski rezervy Stadium	Reg
Skoruk	Olimpiyski rezervy Stadium^{(5)}	Reg
Tavria	Pulyayev Start Stadium	Reg
VPK-Ahro	Kolos Arena	Reg

Notes:

- ^(1) Alians plays its games in Romny at the stadium of former Ahrobiznes.
- ^(1) The stadium is located in Baryshivka.
- ^(3) Dinaz has two small Dinaz Stadium both of which located in Vyshhorod Raion, one in Lyutizh, another in Demydiv.
- ^(4) Druzhba plays in Kryvyi Rih, while it is registered in Kherson Oblast.
- ^(5) Skoruk plays in Dnipro while is from a small village of Tomakivka near the administrative border with Zaporizhzhia Oblast.

== Group stage ==
=== Group 1 ===
Pos	Team	Pld	W	D	L	GF	GA	GD	Pts	Promotion, qualification or relegation
1	FC Malynsk (C)	18	12	5	1	40	12	+28	41	Qualification to playoffs
2	Pokuttia Kolomyia	18	13	1	4	47	13	+34	40	Qualification to playoffs
3	ODEK Orzhiv	18	11	6	1	42	11	+31	39	
4	Karpaty Halych	18	9	6	3	36	11	+25	33	
5	Ahron Velyki Hayi	18	9	6	3	28	16	+12	33	
6	FC Uzhhorod (P)	18	6	2	10	26	37	−11	20	Admission to Ukrainian Second League
7	Rochyn Sosnivka (X)	18	5	2	11	19	12	+7	17	Withdrawn
8	Krystal Chortkiv	18	5	2	11	15	27	−12	17	Withdrawn after the season
9	Ternopil-DYuSSh	18	2	1	15	11	55	−44	7	Withdrawn after the season
10	SC Khmelnytskyi	18	2	1	15	9	79	−70	7	Withdrawn after the season
–	Kobra Ostroh (X)	0	-	-	-	–	–	—	0	Results annulled

Updated to match(es) played on 2 June 2019. Source: http://www.aafu.org.ua/
Rules for classification: 1) points; 2) wins; 3) goals difference; 4) goals scored; 5) head-to-head points; 6) head-to-head wins; 7) head-to-head goals difference; 8) goals scored; 9) draw of lots.
(C) Champions; (P) Admission to the 2019–20 Ukrainian Second League; (X) Withdrew

Notes

- On 20 September 2018 Kobra Ostroh was excluded from the competition on decision of the AAFU commission in organizing competitions. Its record was scratched.
- On 18 May 2019 Rochyn Sosnivka was excluded from the competition on decision of the AAFU commission in organizing competitions.

=== Group 2 ===
Pos	Team	Pld	W	D	L	GF	GA	GD	Pts	Promotion, qualification or relegation
1	LNZ-Lebedyn (C)	22	18	3	1	67	15	+52	57	Qualification to playoffs
2	Viktoriya Mykolayivka	22	17	4	1	58	11	+47	55	Qualification to playoffs
3	Alians Lypova Dolyna (P)	22	14	4	4	54	22	+32	46	Admission to Ukrainian Second League; Qualification to playoffs
4	Avanhard Bziv	22	11	2	9	39	28	+11	35	Withdrawn after the season
5	Dinaz Vyshhorod (P)	22	10	5	7	47	38	+9	35	Admission to Ukrainian Second League
6	MFC Pervomaisk	22	10	1	11	42	41	+1	31	
7	Fakel Lypovets	22	9	1	12	36	46	−10	28	Withdrawn after the season
8	Ahrodim Bakhmach	22	8	3	11	23	34	−11	27	
9	Avanhard Koryukivka	22	7	6	9	31	38	−7	27	
10	Rubikon Vyshneve	22	7	5	10	27	29	−2	26	
11	Olimpik Kropyvnytskyi	22	2	1	19	19	95	−76	7	
12	Chayka Vyshhorod	22	0	3	19	13	59	−46	3	Withdrawn after the season

Updated to match(es) played on 1 June 2019. Source: http://www.aafu.org.ua/
Rules for classification: 1) points; 2) wins; 3) goals difference; 4) goals scored; 5) head-to-head points; 6) head-to-head wins; 7) head-to-head goals difference; 8) goals scored; 9) draw of lots.
(C) Champions; (P) Admission to the 2019–20 Ukrainian Second League

Notes

- On 29 September 2018 the game between Fakel and Ahrodim was interrupted on 35th minute. The outcome of the game was decided by the AAFU CDC. On 30 March 2019 the game was finished from the time at which it was stopped.

=== Group 3 ===
Pos	Team	Pld	W	D	L	GF	GA	GD	Pts	Promotion, qualification or relegation
1	VPK-Ahro Shevchenkivka (C, P)	22	16	5	1	60	12	+48	53	Admission to Ukrainian Second League; Qualification to playoffs
2	Tavria Novotroitske	22	16	4	2	42	12	+30	52	Qualification to playoffs
3	Motor Zaporizhzhia	22	13	6	3	45	20	+25	45	Qualification to playoffs
4	SC Kakhovka	22	10	7	5	32	18	+14	37	
5	Skoruk Tomakivka	22	8	7	7	19	25	−6	31	Withdrawn after the season
6	Peremoha Dnipro	22	7	8	7	28	28	0	29	
7	Druzhba Kryvyi Rih	22	7	4	11	23	33	−10	25	Withdrawn after the season
8	FC Dnipro (Note: FC Dnipro was stripped total of 9 tournament points including 3 points in accordance with the FIFA Disciplinary Committee decision of 1 September 2017, 3 more points on decision of 24 November 2017 and 3 more points on decision of 19 March 2019.)	22	10	3	9	35	27	+8	24	Withdrawn after the season
9	Yarud Mariupol	22	6	6	10	24	20	+4	24	
10	FC Kryvyi Rih	22	5	8	9	28	35	−7	23	Withdrawn after the season
11	Kolos Askania Nova (X)	22	4	2	16	18	32	−14	14	Withdrawn
12	Kobra Kharkiv (Note: Kobra Kharkiv is the amateur squad of FC Kobra Kharkiv that also fielded professional squad in the Ukrainian First League. The team competes among amateurs in the 2018–19 season as Kobra Kharkiv, not as Kobra-2 Kharkiv.) (X)	22	0	0	22	8	100	−92	0	Withdrawn

Updated to match(es) played on 1 June 2019. Source: http://www.aafu.org.ua/
Rules for classification: 1) points; 2) wins; 3) goals difference; 4) goals scored; 5) head-to-head points; 6) head-to-head wins; 7) head-to-head goals difference; 8) goals scored; 9) draw of lots.
(C) Champions; (P) Admission to the 2019–20 Ukrainian Second League; (X) Withdrew

Notes

- Kobra Kharkiv was excluded from the number of participants of the championship according to the decision #10 of the AAFU CDC of 16 November 2018. In games of spring portion of competition to all opponents of Kobra Kharkiv will be awarded technical victories +:–. Kobra Kharkiv withdrew in beginning of November 2018 and played 11 games, losing all of them and in three already were awarded technical losses.
- Druzhba Kryvyi Rih originally from Novomykolaivka after a winter break (24 April 2019) has changed its name (on decision of the AAFU Commission in organizing competitions) as it had played for the last couple of years in Kryvyi Rih.
- Kolos Askania Nova was excluded from the number of participants of the championship according to decision of the AAFU commission in organizing competitions of 30 April 2019. In games of spring portion of competition to all opponents of Kolos Askania Nova will be awarded technical victories +:–.

== Play-offs ==
The first couple of stages (quarterfinals and semifinals) were conducted home and away, and the final took place on a neutral field. The quarterfinals games took place on 8 and 12 June 2019.

=== Teams qualified ===
In parentheses are indicated number of times the club qualified for this phase.

- Group 1: FC Malynsk, Pokuttia Kolomyia
- Group 2: LNZ-Lebedyn, Viktoriya Mykolaivka (2), Alians Lypova Dolyna
- Group 3: VPK-Ahro Shevchenkivka, Tavriya Novotroitske, Motor Zaporizhia

=== Quarterfinals ===
Team 1	Agg.	Team 2	1st leg	2nd leg
FC Motor Zaporizhzhia	0 – 3	FC LNZ-Lebedyn	0 – 3	0 – 0
FC Alyans Lypova Dolyna	3 – 5	FC VPK-Ahro Shevchenkivka	0 – 4	3 – 1
FC Tavria Novotroitske	1 – 3	FC Malynsk	1 – 1	0 – 2
FC Viktoriya Mykolayivka	7 – 3	FC Pokuttia Kolomyia	7 – 1	0 – 2

8 June 2019	Motor Zaporizhzhia	0–3	LNZ-Lebedyn	Zaporizhzhia
15:00 LST		Report	Dyedov 17'; Hrytsai 21'; Kolos 25'	Stadium: SC Motor Sich; Attendance: 200; Referee: Vladyslav Bakulin (Nova Kakhovka)

8 June 2019	Viktoriya Mykolaivka	7–1	Pokuttia Kolomyia	Mykolaivka, Sumy Oblast
17:00 LST	Nelin 11'; Cherednychenko 17'; Akimov 27', 63'; Kuzmin 45' (pen.); Kasianov 61'; Shevchenko 90'	Report	Svyrydov 19'	Stadium: Viktoriya; Attendance: 300; Referee: Artem Mykhailyuk (Kyiv)

8 June 2019	Alyans Lypova Dolyna	0–4	VPK-Ahro Shevchenkivka	Bairak, Sumy Oblast
18:00 LST	Pikul (red card) 80'	Report	Sokolyanskyi 5'; Krasov 42'; Sharko 47', 90+1'	Stadium: Alyans Arena; Attendance: 422; Referee: Andriy Fedoruk (Kyiv Oblast)

8 June 2019	Tavria Novotroitske	1–1	FC Malynsk	Novotroitske, Kherson Oblast
18:00 LST	Komyahin 73'	Report	Onyshchuk 66'	Stadium: Start imeni Pulyayeva; Attendance: 200; Referee: Maksym Ponomarenko (Odesa)

12 June 2019	LNZ-Lebedyn	0–0	Motor Zaporizhzhia	Lebedyn, Cherkasy Oblast
18:00 LST	Kondratyuk (red card) 62'	Report	Pavelko (yellow card) 32' (yellow-red card) 77'	Stadium: LNZ Arena; Attendance: 500; Referee: Pavlo Detsyuk (Chernihiv)

12 June 2019	Pokuttia Kolomyia	2–0	Viktoriya Mykolaivka	Kolomyia, Ivano-Frankivsk Oblast
17:00 LST	Uhrak 20'; Kushetskyi (penalty missed) 23'; Havrylyuk 86'	Report		Stadium: Yunist; Attendance: 600; Referee: Yaroslav Leskiv (Lviv Oblast)

12 June 2019	VPK-Ahro Shevchenkivka	1–3	Alyans Lypova Dolyna	Mahdalynivka, Dnipropetrovsk Oblast
18:00 LST	Shmyhelskyi 17'; Kolomoyets (penalty missed) 59'	Report	Havras 19'; Krasov 45+1' (o.g.); V.Sharai 47'	Stadium: Kolos Arena; Attendance: 300; Referee: Viktor Bondarenko (Mariupol)

12 June 2019	FC Malynsk	2–0	Tavria Novotroitske	Mlyniv, Rivne Oblast
18:00 LST	Datsyuk 5'; Vorobey 18'	Report		Stadium: Kolos; Attendance: 200; Referee: Serhiy Podryhulia (Lutsk)

=== Semifinals ===
The draw for the semifinal round took place on 13 June 2019. Games took place on 17 and 23 June 2019.

Team 1	Agg.	Team 2	1st leg	2nd leg
FC Viktoriya Mykolayivka	4 – 4 (3–1 p)	FC Malynsk	2 – 2	2 – 2
FC VPK-Ahro Shevchenkivka	3 – 3 (a)	FC LNZ-Lebedyn	2 – 0	1 – 3

17 June 2019	Viktoriya Mykolaivka	2–2	FC Malynsk	Mykolaivka, Sumy Oblast
17:00 LST	Chernikov 49'; Shevchenko 83'	Report	Yeremenko 21'; Korolchuk 38'; Lutsyuk (red card) 59'	Stadium: Viktoriya; Attendance: 300; Referee: Vladyslav Dorosh (Kyiv)

17 June 2019	VPK-Ahro Shevchenkivka	2–0	LNZ-Lebedyn	Mahdalynivka, Dnipropetrovsk Oblast
18:00 LST	Kolomoyets 51'; Sokolyanskyi 53'	Report		Stadium: Kolos Arena; Attendance: 300; Referee: Dmytro Kubryak (Odesa)

23 June 2019	FC Malynsk	2–2 (a.e.t.) (1–3 p)	Viktoriya Mykolaivka	Malynsk, Rivne Oblast
17:00 LST	Onyshchuk 50'; Korolchuk 67'	Report	Kasianov 6'; Mykhailyuk 89'	Stadium: Lion; Attendance: 500; Referee: Stepan Lapko (Lviv)
	Penalties
	Herhelyuk (penalty missed); Bryksa (penalty missed); Pronevych (penalty missed); Vorobey (penalty scored)		(penalty scored) Romanenko; (penalty missed) Mykhailyuk; (penalty scored) Kuzmin; (penalty scored) Akimov

23 June 2019	LNZ-Lebedyn	3–1	VPK-Ahro Shevchenkivka	Lebedyn, Cherkasy Oblast
18:00 LST	Diedov 18'; Kolos 30'; Hrytsai 32' (pen.)	Report	Sharko 55'	Stadium: LNZ Arena; Attendance: 700; Referee: Artem Mykhailyuk (Kyiv)

=== Final ===
The final took place on 29 June 2019.

Team 1	Score	Team 2
FC VPK-Ahro Shevchenkivka	1 – 0	FC Viktoriya Mykolaivka

29 June 2019	VPK-Ahro Shevchenkivka	1–0	Viktoriya Mykolaivka	Kyiv
17:00 LST	Marharian 89'	Report; Brief overlook		Stadium: NTK im. Bannikova; Attendance: 600; Referee: Klym Zabroda (Kyiv)

== Number of teams by region ==
Number	Region	Team(s)
5	Dnipropetrovsk Oblast	FC Dnirpo, FC Kryvyi Rih, Peremoha Dnipro, Skoruk Tomakivka, VPK-Ahro Shevchenkivka
4	Kherson Oblast	Druzhba Novomykolaivka, SC Kakhovka, Kolos Askania Nova, Tavriya Novotroitske
3	Kyiv Oblast	Avanhard Bziv, Chaika Vyshhorod, Dinaz Vyshhorod
3	Rivne Oblast	Kobra Ostroh, FC Malynsk, ODEK Orzhiv
3	Ternopil Oblast	Ahron Velyki Hayi, Krystal Chortkiv, Nyva Terebovlya
2	Chernihiv Oblast	Ahrodim Bakhmach, Avanhard Kryukivka
2	Ivano-Frankivsk Oblast	Karpaty Halych, Pokuttia Kolomyia
2	Sumy Oblast	Alians Lypova Dolyna, Viktoriya Mykolaivka
1	Cherkasy Oblast	LNZ Lebedyn
1	Donetsk Oblast	Yarud Mariupol
1	Kharkiv Oblast	Kobra Kharkiv
1	Khmelnytskyi Oblast	SC Khmelnytskyi
1	Kirovohrad Oblast	Olimpik Kropyvnytskyi
1	Kyiv	Rubikon
1	Lviv Oblast	Rochyn Sosnivka
1	Mykolaiv Oblast	MFC Pervomaisk
1	Vinnytsia Oblast	Fakel Lypovets
1	Zakarpattia Oblast	FC Uzhhorod
1	Zaporizhia Oblast	Motor Zaporizhia

== See also ==
- 2018–19 Ukrainian Amateur Cup
- 2019 UEFA Regions' Cup
- 2018–19 Ukrainian Second League
- 2018–19 Ukrainian First League
- 2018–19 Ukrainian Premier League
