= 2014 Ukrainian Football Amateur League =

Ukrainian Football Amateur League
- Season: 2014
- Dates: 30 April – 17 October 2014
- Champions: Rukh Vynnyky (1st title) AF-Pyatykhatska Volodymyrivka (losing finalist)
- Promoted: none
- Relegated: 11 teams (withdrawn)
- UEFA Regions' Cup: AF-Pyatykhatska Volodymyrivka

The 2014 Ukrainian Football Amateur League season was played from 30 April to 17 October 2014.

== Teams ==
=== Returning/reformed clubs ===
- Yednist Plysky (returning, last played season in 2004)
- Podillya Khmelnytskyi (returning, last played season in 2007)
- Myr Hornostayivka (returning, last played season in 2011)
- Lehion Zhytomyr (returning, last played season in 2012)

=== Debut ===
List of teams that are debuting this season in the league.

- Balkany Zorya
- Mayak Sarny
- Elektrovazhmash Kharkiv
- Varvarivka Mykolaiv
- AF Piatykhatska Volodymyrivka
- VPK-Ahro Shevchenkivka
- Kolos Kovalivka

=== Withdrawn ===
List of clubs that took part in last year's competition but chose not to participate in the 2014 season.

- Avanhard Novohrad-Volynskyi
- YSB Chernihiv
- Lokomotyv Kupiansk
- Barsa Sumy
- Hvardiyets Hvardiyske
- Nove Zhyttya Andriivka
- Bastion Illichivsk
- Kolos Khlibodarivka
- ITV Simferopol
- Bukovyna-2-LS Chernivtsi
- LKT Slavutych
- Zbruch Volochysk

List of clubs that withdrew during the season or right after it:

- USC-Rubin Donetsk

=== Locations ===
Location of participating teams of the 2014 Ukrainian amateur championship

== First stage ==
=== Group 1 ===
Pos	Team	Pld	W	D	L	GF	GA	GD	Pts	Qualification
1	Rukh Vynnyky	8	5	1	2	17	8	+9	16	Second Stage
2	ODEK Orzhiv	8	4	2	2	13	9	+4	14	Second Stage
3	Vinnytsia	8	4	2	2	10	6	+4	14	
4	Mayak Sarny	8	2	3	3	8	11	−3	9	
5	Podillya Khmelnytskyi	8	0	2	6	4	18	−14	2	

=== Group 2 ===
Pos	Team	Pld	W	D	L	GF	GA	GD	Pts	Qualification
1	Zoria Biloziria	10	8	2	0	14	4	+10	26	Second Stage
2	Kolos Kovalivka	10	6	3	1	19	5	+14	21	Second Stage
3	Avanhard Koryukivka	10	5	1	4	9	8	+1	16	
4	Yednist Plysky	10	2	2	6	7	16	−9	8	
5	Retro Vatutine	10	2	2	6	4	16	−12	8	
6	Lehion Zhytomyr	10	2	0	8	6	10	−4	6	withdrew

=== Group 3 ===
Pos	Team	Pld	W	D	L	GF	GA	GD	Pts	Qualification
1	AF-Pyatykhatska Volodymyrivka	6	4	1	1	27	8	+19	13	Second Stage
2	Elektrovazhmash Kharkiv	6	4	1	1	13	4	+9	13	Second Stage
3	VPK-Ahro Shevchenkivka	6	2	2	2	5	8	−3	8	
4	Olimpik Kirovohrad	6	0	0	6	4	29	−25	0	

Notes:

- FC USK-Rubin Donetsk was included in the group, yet because of the war in Donbas it was forced to withdraw. The club played only one game tying it with AF-Pyatykhatska 3:3. All its results were annulled.

=== Group 4 ===
Pos	Team	Pld	W	D	L	GF	GA	GD	Pts	Qualification
1	Balkany Zoria	8	4	1	3	14	9	+5	13	Second Stage
2	Burevisnyk Petrove	8	4	0	4	10	13	−3	12	Second Stage
3	Myr Hornostayivka	8	3	2	3	9	9	0	11	
4	Torpedo Mykolaiv	8	3	2	3	14	15	−1	11	
5	Varvarivka Mykolaiv	8	3	1	4	11	12	−1	10	

== Second stage ==
The games in the group took place on September 17 through 20 in Holovkivka and Petrove (both in Kirovohrad Oblast).

=== Group 1 ===
Pos	Team	Pld	W	D	L	GF	GA	GD	Pts	Qualification	APV	ODK	ZBI	BPE
1	AF-Pyatykhatska Volodymyrivka (H)	3	2	1	0	5	2	+3	7	Final game	—	1–0	1–1	3–1
2	ODEK Orzhiv	3	2	0	1	4	1	+3	6			—	1–0	3–0
3	Zoria Biloziria	3	1	1	1	4	3	+1	4				—	3–1
4	Burevisnyk Petrove	3	0	0	3	2	9	−7	0					—

(H) Hosts

=== Group 2 ===
The games in the group took place on September 17 through 20 in Vynnyky and Dubliany (both suburbs of Lviv).

Pos	Team	Pld	W	D	L	GF	GA	GD	Pts	Qualification	RVY	KKO	EKH	BZO
1	Rukh Vynnyky (H)	3	2	1	0	4	2	+2	7	Final game	—	0–0	3–2	1–0
2	Kolos Kovalivka	3	1	1	1	2	4	−2	4			—	1–0	1–4
3	Elektrovazhmash Kharkiv	3	1	0	2	4	4	0	3				—	2–0
4	Balkany Zoria	3	1	0	2	4	4	0	3					—

(H) Hosts

== Final ==
17 October 2014	Rukh Vynnyky	1–0	AF-Pyatykhatska Volodymyrivka	Central Stadium, Vinnytsia
	Sheptytsky 19'	Report		Attendance: 700; Referee: S. Boyko (Kyiv Oblast)

== Number of teams by region ==
Number	Region	Team(s)
3	Kirovohrad Oblast	AF Piatykhatska, Burevisnyk Petrove, Olimpik Kirovohrad
2	Cherkasy Oblast	Retro Vatutine, Zorya Bilozirya
2	Chernihiv Oblast	Avanhard Koryukivka, Yednist Plysky
2	Mykolaiv Oblast	Torpedo Mykolaiv, FC Varvarivka
2	Rivne Oblast	Mayak Sarny, ODEK Orzhiv
1	Dnipropetrovsk Oblast	VPK-Ahro Shevchenkivka
1	Donetsk Oblast	USC-Rubin Donetsk
1	Kharkiv Oblast	Elektrovazhmash Kharkiv
1	Kherson Oblast	Myr Hornostaivka
1	Khmelnytskyi Oblast	Podillia Khmelnytskyi
1	Kyiv Oblast	Kolos Kovalivka
1	Lviv Oblast	Rukh Vynnyky
1	Odesa Oblast	Balkany Zorya
1	Vinnytsia Oblast	FC Vinnytsia
1	Volyn Oblast	FC Lutsk
1	Zhytomyr Oblast	Lehion Zhytomyr

== See also ==
- 2014 Ukrainian Amateur Cup
