= 2019 Football Championship of Kherson Oblast =

Football Championship of Kherson Oblast
- Season: 2019
- Champions: FC Tavriya Novotroitske

The 2019 Football Championship of Kherson Oblast was won by FC Tavriya Novotroitske.

== League table ==
Pos	Team	Pld	W	D	L	GF	GA	GD	Pts
1	Tavria Novotroitske (C)	12	10	1	1	34	11	+23	31
2	SC Kakhovka	12	3	5	4	16	16	0	14
3	Khliborob Nyzhni Torhayi	12	4	2	6	19	22	−3	14
4	Kronau Vysokopillia	12	1	4	7	17	37	−20	7

Source: "Чемпіонат Херсонської області 2019". Footboom. Archived from the original on 2020-06-20.
(C) Champions
- FC Tavria Novotroitske and SC Kakhovka played in the 2018–19 Ukrainian Football Amateur League and the 2019–20 Ukrainian Football Amateur League.
