= 2009 Ukrainian Football Amateur League =

Ukrainian Football Amateur League
- Season: 2009
- Champions: Yednist-2 Plysky (1st title) Torpedo Mykolaiv (losing finalist)
- Promoted: 1 – FC Morshyn

Following are the results of the Ukrainian Football Amateur League 2009 season. Participation is restricted to the regional (Oblast) champions and/or the most regarded team by the respective regional association.

== Teams ==
=== Returning ===
- Olimpik Kirovohrad (returning, last played season in 2007)

=== Debut ===
List of teams that are debuting this season in the league.

- Bastion-2 Illichivsk
- FC Morshyn
- Irpin Horenychi
- Zbruch Volochysk
- Kniahynyn Pidhaichyky
- KNTEU

=== Withdrawn ===
List of clubs that took part in last year competition, but chose not to participate in 2009 season:

- Ametyst Oleksandriya
- Karpaty Yaremche
- Sokil Berezhany
- BRB-VIK Volodymyr-Volynskyi
- Kholodnyi Yar Kamianka
- Sokil Zolochiv
- Chornomornaftohaz Simferopol
- Metalurh Malyn
- Volyn-Tsement Zdolbuniv
- Illich Osypenko
- Polissia-2 Zhytomyr
- Zirka Kyiv

=== Location map ===
Location of participating teams in the 2009 Ukrainian amateur championship

== First stage ==
=== Group 1 ===
| Pos | Team | Pld | W | D | L | GF | GA | GD | Pts | Qualification |
|---|---|---|---|---|---|---|---|---|---|---|
| 1 | Zbruch Volochysk | 8 | 7 | 1 | 0 | 16 | 4 | +12 | 22 | Second Stage |
| 2 | Luzhany | 8 | 4 | 3 | 1 | 18 | 4 | +14 | 15 | Second Stage |
| 3 | Kniahynyn Pidhaichyky | 8 | 4 | 2 | 2 | 15 | 9 | +6 | 14 | |
| 4 | Morshyn | 8 | 1 | 1 | 6 | 12 | 23 | −11 | 4 | Second League |
| 5 | Verest Dunaivtsi | 8 | 0 | 1 | 7 | 4 | 25 | −21 | 1 | |

=== Group 2 ===
| Pos | Team | Pld | W | D | L | GF | GA | GD | Pts | Qualification |
|---|---|---|---|---|---|---|---|---|---|---|
| 1 | Yednist-2 Plysky | 6 | 5 | 0 | 1 | 15 | 5 | +10 | 15 | Second Stage |
| 2 | Irpin Horenychi | 6 | 4 | 1 | 1 | 11 | 6 | +5 | 13 | Second Stage |
| 3 | ODEK Orzhiv | 6 | 1 | 2 | 3 | 5 | 8 | −3 | 5 | |
| 4 | Zenit Boyarka | 6 | 0 | 1 | 5 | 4 | 16 | −12 | 1 | |
| 5 | Horysont Koziatyn | 0 | 0 | 0 | 0 | 0 | 0 | 0 | 0 | withdrew |

=== Group 3 ===
| Pos | Team | Pld | W | D | L | GF | GA | GD | Pts | Qualification |
|---|---|---|---|---|---|---|---|---|---|---|
| 1 | Myr Hornostaivka | 6 | 4 | 1 | 1 | 14 | 6 | +8 | 13 | |
| 2 | Toprpedo Mykolaiv | 6 | 4 | 1 | 1 | 10 | 6 | +4 | 13 | Second Stage |
| 3 | Bastion-2 Illychivsk | 6 | 3 | 0 | 3 | 10 | 10 | 0 | 9 | Second Stage |
| 4 | Olympic Kirovohrad | 6 | 0 | 0 | 6 | 3 | 15 | −12 | 0 | |

=== Group 4 ===
| Pos | Team | Pld | W | D | L | GF | GA | GD | Pts | Qualification |
|---|---|---|---|---|---|---|---|---|---|---|
| 1 | Slovkhlib Slovyansk | 6 | 4 | 0 | 2 | 8 | 5 | +3 | 12 | Second Stage |
| 2 | Lokomotyv Kupiansk | 6 | 3 | 1 | 2 | 7 | 7 | 0 | 10 | Second Stage |
| 3 | KNTEU Kyiv | 6 | 2 | 1 | 3 | 4 | 6 | −2 | 7 | |
| 4 | Khodak Cherkasy | 6 | 2 | 0 | 4 | 4 | 5 | −1 | 6 | |

== Second stage ==
The games in the group took place on September 11 through 15th in Mykolaiv and Ochakiv.

=== Group 1 ===
| Pos | Team | Pld | W | D | L | GF | GA | GD | Pts | Qualification | TMY | IHO | ZAV | LUZ |
|---|---|---|---|---|---|---|---|---|---|---|---|---|---|---|
| 1 | Toprpedo Mykolaiv (H) | 3 | 3 | 0 | 0 | 8 | 0 | +8 | 9 | Final game | — | 2–0 | 4–0 | 2–0 |
| 2 | Irpin Horenychi | 3 | 1 | 1 | 1 | 3 | 5 | −2 | 4 | | | — | 2–0 | 1–1 |
| 3 | Zbruch Volochysk | 3 | 1 | 0 | 2 | 2 | 6 | −4 | 3 | | | | — | 2–0 |
| 4 | Luzhany | 3 | 0 | 1 | 2 | 1 | 5 | −4 | 1 | | | | | — |

(H) Hosts

=== Group 2 ===
The games in the group took place on September 17 through 20 in Slovyansk.

| Pos | Team | Pld | W | D | L | GF | GA | GD | Pts | Qualification | Y2P | SSL | LKU | B2I |
|---|---|---|---|---|---|---|---|---|---|---|---|---|---|---|
| 1 | Yednist-2 Plysky | 3 | 2 | 1 | 0 | 5 | 2 | +3 | 7 | Final game | — | 1–1 | 2–1 | 2–0 |
| 2 | Slovkhlib Slovyansk (H) | 3 | 2 | 1 | 0 | 4 | 2 | +2 | 7 | | | — | 1–0 | 2–1 |
| 3 | Lokomotyv Kupiansk | 3 | 1 | 0 | 2 | 2 | 3 | −1 | 3 | | | | — | 1–0 |
| 4 | Bastion-2 Illychivsk | 3 | 0 | 0 | 3 | 1 | 5 | −4 | 0 | | | | | — |

(H) Hosts

== Championship match ==
3 October 2009
15:00

| Yednist-2 Plysky | 2 – 1 | Torpedo Mykolaiv |
|---|---|---|
| Tarykin 60', 69' | Report | Tormozov 33' |

Illichivets Stadium, Uman
Attendance: 1,000
Referee: Anatoliy Abdula

== Number of teams by region ==
| Number | Region | Team(s) |
|---|---|---|
| 2 | Khmelnytskyi Oblast | Verest Dunaivtsi, Zbruch Volochysk |
| 2 | Kyiv Oblast | Irpin Horenychi, Zenit Boyarka |
| 1 | Cherkasy Oblast | Khodak Cherkasy |
| 1 | Chernihiv Oblast | Yednist-2 Plysky |
| 1 | Chernivtsi Oblast | FC Luzhany |
| 1 | Donetsk Oblast | Slovkhlib Slovyansk |
| 1 | Ivano-Frankivsk Oblast | Knyahynyn Pidhaichyky |
| 1 | Kharkiv Oblast | Lokomotyv Kupiansk |
| 1 | Kherson Oblast | Myr Hornostaivka |
| 1 | Kirovohrad Oblast | Olimpik Kirovohrad |
| 1 | Kyiv | KNTEU |
| 1 | Lviv Oblast | FC Morshyn |
| 1 | Mykolaiv Oblast | Torpedo Mykolaiv |
| 1 | Odesa Oblast | Bastion-2 Illichivsk |
| 1 | Rivne Oblast | ODEK Orzhiv |
| 1 | Vinnytsia Oblast | Horyzont Koziatyn |
