= Kherson Oblast Football Association =

Kherson Oblast Football Association is a football governing body in the region of Kherson Oblast, Ukraine. The association is a member of the Regional Council of FFU and the collective member of the FFU itself.

== Previous Champions ==
- 1947 Skadovsk
- 1948 FC Avanhard Kherson
- 1949
- 1950 FC Spartak Kherson
- 1951
- 1952 FC Spartak Henichesk
- 1953 FC Spartak Kherson (2)
- 1954 FC Spartak Kherson (3)
- 1955 FC Avanhard Kherson (2)
- 1956 FC Avanhard Kherson (3)
- 1957 FC Avanhard Kherson (4)
- 1958 FC Avanhard Kherson (5)
- 1959 FC Avanhard Henichesk
- 1960 FC Enerhiya Nova Kakhovka
- 1961 FC Enerhiya Nova Kakhovka (2)
- 1962 FC Enerhiya Nova Kakhovka (3)
- 1963 FC Lokomotyv Kherson
- 1964 FC Enerhiya Nova Kakhovka (4)
- 1965 FC Lokomotyv Kherson (2)
- 1966 FC Enerhiya Nova Kakhovka (5)
- 1967 FC Naftovyk Kherson
- 1968 FC Budivelnyk Henichesk
- 1969 FC Budivelnyk Henichesk (2)
- 1970 FC Tekstylnyk Kherson
- 1971 FC Enerhiya Nova Kakhovka (6)
- 1972 FC Spartak Kherson (4)
- 1973 FC Enerhiya Nova Kakhovka (7)
- 1974 FC Enerhiya Nova Kakhovka (8)
- 1975 FC Krystal Kherson
- 1976 FC Enerhiya Nova Kakhovka (9)
- 1977 FC Enerhiya Nova Kakhovka (10)
- 1978 FC Kolos Novomykolayivka
- 1979 FC Kolos Skadovsk
- 1980 FC Enerhiya Nova Kakhovka (11)
- 1981 FC Enerhiya Nova Kakhovka (12)
- 1982 FC Kolos Osokorivka
- 1983 FC Kolos Osokorivka (2)
- 1984 FC Kolos Osokorivka (3)
- 1985 FC Kolos Osokorivka (4)
- 1986 FC Enerhiya Nova Kakhovka (13)
- 1987 FC Enerhiya Nova Kakhovka (14)
- 1988 FC Meliorator Kakhovka
- 1989 FC Meliorator Kakhovka (2)
- 1990 FC Tavria Novotroitske
- 1991 FC Meliorator Kakhovka (3)
- =independence of Ukraine=
- 1992 FC Tavria Novotroitske (2)
- 1993 FC Tavria Novotroitske (3)
- 1994 FC Tavria Novotroitske (4)
- 1995 FC Kolos Osokorivka (5)
- 1996 FC Tavria Novotroitske (5)
- 1997 FC Myr Hornostayivka
- 1998 FC Dynamo Tsyurupinsk
- 1999 FC Dynamo Tsyurupinsk (2)
- 2000 FC KZESO Kakhovka (4)
- 2001 FC KZESO Kakhovka (5)
- 2002 FC KZESO Kakhovka (6)
- 2003 FC KZESO Kakhovka (7)
- 2003 FC Dynamo Tsyurupinsk (3)
- 2004 FC Enerhiya Nova Kakhovka (15)
- 2005 FC Myr Hornostayivka (2)
- 2006 FC Myr Hornostayivka (3)
- 2007 FC Myr Hornostayivka (4)
- 2008 FC Syhma Kherson
- 2009 FC Enerhiya Nova Kakhovka (16)
- 2010 FC Krystal Kherson (2)
- 2011 FC Tavria Novotroitske (6)
- 2012 FC Temp Mykilske
- 2013 FC Tavria Novotroitske (7)
- Russo-Ukrainian War, partial occupation
- 2014 FC Viktoriya Bekhtery
- 2015 FC Kolos Khlibodarivka
- 2016 FC Kolos Khlibodarivka (2)
- 2017 FC Druzhba Novomykolaivka
- 2018 SC Kakhovka (8)
- 2019 FC Tavria Novotroitske (8)
- =full-scale Russian invasion=

=== Top winners ===
- 16 - FC Enerhiya Nova Kakhovka
- 8 - FC KZESO (Meliorator) Kakhovka
- 8 - FC Tavria Novotroitske
- 5 - FC Avanhard Kherson
- 5 - FC Kolos Osokorivka
- 4 - FC Spartak Kherson
- 4 - FC Myr Hornostayivka
- 3 - FC Dynamo Tsyurupinsk
- 2 - 4 clubs (Kolos Khl., Krystal, Budivelnyk, Lokomotyv)
- 1 - 11 clubs

== Professional clubs ==
locations of all professional clubs and "teams of maters"
- FC Spartak Kherson, 1947-1949, 1958-1960 (6 seasons)
- FC Krystal Kherson (Mayak, Stroitel, Lokomotiv, Vodnyk, Tavria), 1961-2006, 2011-2017, 2018-2022 (56 seasons)
- FC Enerhiya Nova Kakhovka, 1967-1970, 2010-2022 (16 seasons)

- FC Kakhovka (Meliorator), 1992-1996 (5 seasons)
- FC Tavria Novotroitske, 1994-1995 (a season)
- FC Myr Hornostayivka, 2011-2014, 2015-2019 (7 seasons)
- (SC Tavria Simferopol out of Beryslav), 2017-2022 (5 seasons)

== Other clubs at national/republican level ==
Note: the list includes clubs that played at republican competitions before 1959 and the amateur or KFK competitions after 1964. Until 1944, Kherson Oblast was part of Mykolaiv and Zaporizhia oblasts.

- Kherson, 1936, 1937
- Znannia Kherson, 1938
- Spartak Kherson, 1946, 1950–1957, 1973
- Dynamo Kherson, 1947
- Avanhard Kherson, 1948, 1949, 1958, 1959
- Torpedo Henichesk, 1949
- Enerhia Nova Kakhovka, 1954, 1956, 1957, 1959, 1964 – 1966, 1971 – 1994/95, 2010
- Enerhia Kakhovka, 1955
- Krystal Kherson (Krystal (klubnaya), Lokomotyv (klubnaya)), 1965, 1974, 2011, 2017/18
- Budivelnyk Henichesk, 1969, 1970, 1975 – 1977
- Tekstylnyk Kherson, 1971
- Naftovyk Kherson, 1977, 1979, 1980
- Kolos Skadovsk, 1978 – 1981
- Kolos Osokorivka, 1981, 1983 – 1993/94, 1995/96
- Shliakhovyk Kherson, 1982, 1988
- SC Kakhovka (Meliorator), 1989 – 1991, 2002 – 2005, 2015, 2016, 2017/18 – 2021/22
- Tavria Novotroitske, 1990 – 1993/94, 2018/19, 2019/20
- Slavuta Novovorontsovka, 1993/94
- Kharchovyk Bilozerka, 1994/95
- Dzharylhach Skadovsk, 1994/95
- Dynamo Tsyurupinsk, 2000
- Ukrrichflot Kherson, 2003, 2004
- Syhma Kherson, 2007
- Myr Hornostaivka, 2008 – 2011, 2014, 2015
- Kolos Khlibodarivka, 2013, 2016, 2018/19
- Druzhba Novomykolaivka, 2017/18, 2018/19
- Khliborob Nyzhni Torhayi, 2021/22

== See also ==
- FFU Council of Regions
