= 2007 Ukrainian Football Amateur League =

Ukrainian Football Amateur League
- Season: 2007
- Champions: Bastion Illichivsk (1st title) Yednist-2 Plysky (losing finalist)
- Promoted: 3 – Podillia, Arsenal, Olimpik

Following are the results of the Ukrainian Football Amateur League 2007 season. Participation was restricted to the regional (Oblast) champions and/or the most regarded team by the respective regional association.

This season competition consisted of three stages. The first stage was organized in regional principal and was played in two rounds where each team could play another at its home ground. The second stage was played in three different places to identify the best six (Luzhany, Plysky, and Illichivsk). The games were organized in one round. The two best out of each group advanced to the semifinals where teams were split into two groups. The semifinals and the final were played in Illichivsk. The winners of the groups advanced to the finals and runners-up matched up in the game for the third place.

== Teams ==
- Newly admitted former professional club: Podillia Khmelnytskyi (1959 as Dynamo)
  - The club last played at an amateur level when the Football Championship of the Ukrainian SSR was held among manufacturing teams before 1959.

=== Returning ===
- ODEK Orzhiv (returning, last played season in 2005)
- Sokil Berezhany (returning, last played season in 2005)

=== Debut ===
List of teams that are debuting this season in the league.

- Antares Obukhiv
- Budfarfor Slavuta
- Olimpik Kirovohrad
- Zirka Kirovohrad
- Arsenal Bila Tserkva
- Donbas-Krym Donetsk
- OLKAR Sharhorod
- Avanhard Sutysky
- Halychyna Lviv
- Syhma Kherson
- Bastion Illichivsk
- FC Luzhany
- Yednist-2 Plysky

=== Withdrawn ===
List of clubs that took part in last year competition, but chose not to participate in 2007 season:

- FC Bilyayivka
- Illichivets Uman
- Elektrometalurh-NZF Nikopol
- Iskra-Podillia Teofipol
- Hirnyk Komsomolske
- Shakhtar Konotop
- Hran Buzova
- Sokil Sukhovolia

=== Location map ===
Location of participating teams in the 2009 Ukrainian amateur championship

== First stage ==
=== Group A ===
Pos	Team	Pld	W	D	L	GF	GA	GD	Pts	Qualification
1	Halychyna Lviv	8	5	2	1	13	11	+2	17	Second Stage
2	Podillya Khmelnytskyi	8	5	1	2	21	6	+15	16	joined Druha Liha
3	Luzhany	8	5	1	2	16	7	+9	16	Second Stage
4	Tsementnyk Yamnytsia	8	2	0	6	7	13	−6	6	
5	Volyn-Tsement Zdolbuniv	8	0	2	6	6	26	−20	2	

=== Group B ===
Pos	Team	Pld	W	D	L	GF	GA	GD	Pts	Qualification
1	Metalurh Malyn	8	5	2	1	17	9	+8	17	Second Stage
2	Avanhard Sutysky	8	5	1	2	8	5	+3	16	Second Stage
3	Budfarfor Slavuta	8	3	1	4	10	9	+1	10	
4	ODEK Orzhiv	8	2	3	3	10	11	−1	9	
5	Sokil Berezhany	8	0	3	5	4	15	−11	3	

=== Group C ===
Pos	Team	Pld	W	D	L	GF	GA	GD	Pts	Qualification
1	Yednist-2 Plysky	8	4	1	3	16	15	+1	13	Second Stage
2	Zirka Kirovohrad	8	4	1	3	12	12	0	13	joined Druha Liha
3	Khodak Cherkasy	8	3	3	2	15	10	+5	12	
4	Arsenal Bila Tserkva	8	2	3	3	8	6	+2	9	joined Druha Liha
5	Antares Obukhiv	8	1	2	5	9	17	−8	5	

=== Group D ===
Pos	Team	Pld	W	D	L	GF	GA	GD	Pts	Qualification
1	Bastion Illichivsk	8	6	1	1	17	9	+8	19	Second Stage
2	OLKAR Sharhorod	8	3	3	2	9	10	−1	12	Second Stage
3	Ivan Odesa	8	3	2	3	12	8	+4	11	Second Stage
4	Sigma Kherson	8	3	1	4	9	11	−2	10	
5	Bryz Izmail	8	1	1	6	7	16	−9	4	

=== Group E ===
Pos	Team	Pld	W	D	L	GF	GA	GD	Pts	Qualification
1	Lokomotyv Kupiansk	6	5	1	0	14	3	+11	16	Second Stage
2	Velyka Bahachka	6	4	1	1	17	16	+1	13	
3	Donbas-Krym Donetsk	6	1	0	5	6	9	−3	3	
4	Olimpik Kirovohrad	6	1	0	5	3	22	−19	3	

== Second stage ==
(in Luzhany)

=== Group 1 ===
Pos	Team	Pld	W	D	L	GF	GA	GD	Pts	Qualification	LUZ	OSH	HLV	MMA
1	Luzhany (H)	3	3	0	0	7	1	+6	9	Semifinals	—	1–0	1–0	5–1
2	OLKAR Sharhorod	3	2	0	1	6	1	+5	6	Semifinals		—	1–0	5–0
3	Halychyna Lviv	3	1	0	2	7	4	+3	3				—	7–2
3	Metalurh Malyn	3	0	0	3	3	17	−14	0					—

(H) Hosts

(in Plysky)

=== Group 2 ===
FC Yednist-2 Plysky - FC Lokomotyv Kupiansk 2:0 All participants of the group advanced farther.

(in Illichivsk)

=== Group 3 ===
Pos	Team	Pld	W	D	L	GF	GA	GD	Pts	Qualification	BIL	ASU	IOD
1	Bastion Illichivsk (H)	2	2	0	0	9	4	+5	6	Semifinals	—	5–1	4–3
2	Avanhard Sutysky	2	1	0	1	3	6	−3	3	Semifinals		—	2–1
3	Ivan Odesa	2	0	0	2	4	6	−2	0				—

(H) Hosts

== Semifinals ==
(in Illichivsk)

=== Group A ===
Pos	Team	Pld	W	D	L	GF	GA	GD	Pts	Qualification	BIL	LKU	OSH
1	Bastion Illichivsk (H)	2	2	0	0	4	0	+4	6	Final game	—	1–0	3–0
2	Lokomotyv Kupiansk	2	1	0	1	1	1	0	3	Third place		—	1–0
3	OLKAR Sharhorod	2	0	0	2	0	4	−4	0				—

(H) Hosts

=== Group B ===
Pos	Team	Pld	W	D	L	GF	GA	GD	Pts	Qualification	Y2P	LUZ	ASU
1	Yednist-2 Plysky	2	2	0	0	4	2	+2	6	Final game	—	2–1	2–1
2	Luzhany	2	1	0	1	3	3	0	3	Third place		—	2–1
3	Avanhard Sutysky	2	0	0	2	2	4	−2	0				—

== Final ==
The game took place in Illichivsk, Odesa Oblast. September 29, 2007.

Bastion Illichivsk - Yednist-2 Plysky 4:0 (1:0)

Match for the 3rd place
Luzhany - Lokomotyv Kupiansk 3:2 (1:1)

== Number of teams by region ==
Number	Region	Team(s)
3	Odesa Oblast	Bastion Illichivsk, Bryz Izmail, Ivan Odesa
2	Khmelnytskyi Oblast	Budfarfor Slavuta, Podillia Khmelnytskyi
2	Kirovohrad Oblast	Olimpik Kirovohrad, Zirka Kirovohrad
2	Kyiv Oblast	Antares Obukhiv, Arsenal Bila Tserkva
2	Rivne Oblast	ODEK Orzhiv, Volyn-Tsement Zdolbuniv
2	Vinnytsia Oblast	Avanhard Sutysky, OLKAR Sharhorod
1	Cherkasy Oblast	Khodak Cherkasy
1	Chernihiv Oblast	Yednist-2 Plysky
1	Chernivtsi Oblast	FC Luzhany
1	Donetsk Oblast	Donbas-Krym Donetsk
1	Ivano-Frankivsk Oblast	Tsementnyk Yamnytsia
1	Kharkiv Oblast	Lokomotyv Kupiansk
1	Kherson Oblast	Syhma Kherson
1	Lviv Oblast	Halychyna Lviv
1	Poltava Oblast	FC Velyka Bahachka
1	Ternopil Oblast	Sokil Berezhany
1	Zhytomyr Oblast	Metalurh Malyn
