= 2005 Ukrainian Football Amateur League =

Ukrainian Football Amateur League
- Season: 2005
- Champions: Ivan Odesa (1st title) Feniks-Illichovets Kalinine (runner-up)
- Promoted: 3 – Sokil, Yalos, Feniks-Illichovets*

The 2005 Ukrainian Football Amateur League season.

== Teams ==
=== Returning ===
- ZAlK Zaporizhia

=== Debut ===
List of teams that are debuting this season in the league.

Metalist-UHMK Kyiv, Illichivets Uman, Kolos Stepove, Yalos Yalta, Feniks-Illichovets Kalinine

=== Withdrawn ===
List of clubs that took part in last year competition, but chose not to participate in 2005 season:

- Rozdillia Novyi Rozdil
- Iskra Teofipol
- Ukrrichflot Kherson
- Karpaty Yaremche
- FC Korosten
- Slovkhlib Slovyansk
- Torpedo Kostopil
- Interahrosystema Mena

=== Location map ===
Location of participating teams in the 2009 Ukrainian amateur championship

== First stage ==
=== Group 1 ===
Pos	Team	Pld	W	D	L	GF	GA	GD	Pts	Qualification
1	Nizhyn	10	6	3	1	15	4	+11	21	withdrew
2	Yevropa Pryluky	10	5	3	2	12	4	+8	18	Second Stage
3	ODEK Orzhiv	10	4	3	3	13	14	−1	15	Second Stage
4	Sokil Berezhany	10	4	2	4	10	7	+3	14	withdrew
5	Metalist-UHMK Kyiv	10	2	5	3	8	14	−6	11	
36	Volyn-Tsement Zdolbuniv	10	1	0	9	8	23	−15	3	

Note: Sokil Berezhany decided to join 2005–06 Ukrainian Second League. Nizhyn withdrew after first stage.

=== Group 2 ===
Pos	Team	Pld	W	D	L	GF	GA	GD	Pts	Qualification
1	KZEZO Kakhovka	8	7	0	1	17	5	+12	21	withdrew
2	Feniks-Illichovets Kalinine	8	5	0	3	10	10	0	15	Second Stage
3	Ivan Odesa	8	3	1	4	10	9	+1	10	Second Stage
4	Kolos Stepove	8	2	1	5	5	10	−5	7	
5	Illichivets Uman	8	2	0	6	8	16	−8	6	

Note: KZEZO Kakhovka withdrew after first stage.

=== Group 3 ===
Pos	Team	Pld	W	D	L	GF	GA	GD	Pts	Qualification
1	ZAlK Zaporizhzhia	8	6	2	0	20	7	+13	20	withdrew
2	Yalos Yalta	8	4	2	2	9	11	−2	14	withdrew
3	HU ZIDMU-Spartak Zaporizhzhia	8	3	3	2	9	13	−4	12	
4	Metalurh Komsomolske	8	2	2	4	9	12	−3	8	Second Stage
5	Lokomotyv Kupiansk	8	0	1	7	5	9	−4	1	withdrew

Note: Yalos Yalta decided to join 2005–06 Ukrainian Second League. ZAlK Zaporizhzhia withdrew after first stage. Lokomotyv Kupiansk withdrew during first stage.

== Second stage ==
The games in the group took place on September 10 through 16th in Odesa.

Pos	Team	Pld	W	D	L	GF	GA	GD	Pts	Qualification
1	Ivan Odesa	4	4	0	0	11	2	+9	12	Champion
2	Feniks-Illichovets Kalinine	4	3	0	1	10	5	+5	9	Silver Medals
3	ODEK Orzhiv	4	1	1	2	8	9	−1	4	Bronze Medals
3	Yevropa Pryluky	4	1	1	2	6	7	−1	4	
5	HU ZIDMU-Spartak Zaporizhzhia	4	0	0	4	4	16	−12	0	

== Number of teams by region ==
Number	Region	Team(s)
2	Autonomous Republic of Crimea	Feniks-Illichovets Kalinine, Yalos Yalta
2	Chernihiv Oblast	FC Nizhyn, Yevropa Pryluky
2	Rivne Oblast	ODEK Orzhiv, Volyn-Tsement Zdolbuniv
2	Zaporizhia Oblast	ZAlK Zaporizhia, ZIDMU-Spartak Zaporizhia
1	Cherkasy Oblast	Illichivets Uman
1	Donetsk Oblast	Metalurh Komsomolske
1	Kharkiv Oblast	Lokomotyv Kupiansk
1	Kherson Oblast	KZEZO Kakhovka
1	Kyiv	Metalist-UHMK
1	Mykolaiv Oblast	Kolos Stepove
1	Odesa Oblast	Ivan Odesa
1	Ternopil Oblast	Sokil Berezhany

== Sources ==
- Lander, Yurii (2008), Футбол в Украине 2007-2008 статистический ежигодник выпуск 17 [Football in Ukraine 2007-2008 statistical yearbook issue 17] (in Russian)
