= 2017–18 Ukrainian Football Amateur League =

Ukrainian Football Amateur League
- Season: 2017–18
- Dates: 5 August 2017 – 30 June 2018
- Champions: Viktoriya Mykolaivka (1st title) Tavria-Skif Rozdol (losing finalist)
- Promoted: 6 – Minaj, Kalush, Chaika, Krystal, Metalurh, Hirnyk
- Relegated: 4 teams

The 2017–18 Ukrainian Football Amateur League season was the 22nd since it replaced the competition of physical culture clubs. The competition started on 5 August 2017.

On 1 August 2017, the AAFU at its website announced the "season's contours". In explanation, AAFU disclosed that it has intention to conduct the competition in three groups that are split based on geographic principle and start it at the end of that week, while the composition of only two groups was confirmed.

== Teams ==
=== Relegated professional clubs ===
- Krystal Kherson – 13th place in the 2016–17 Ukrainian Second League (returning, last played season in 2011)

=== Returning/reformed clubs ===
- FC Chernihiv (returning, last played season in 2013 as YSB Chernihiv)
- Hirnyk Kryvyi Rih (returning, last played season in 2004)
- FC Kalush (returning, last played season in 1994–95)
- Olimpik Kropyvnytskyi (returning, last played season in 2014)
- Pokuttia Kolomyia (returning, last played season in 1995–96)

=== Debut ===
List of teams that are debuting this season in the league.

- Ahrobiznes TSK Romny
- FC Khmelnytskyi
- Yarud Mariupol
- Druzhba Novomykolaivka
- Metalurh Zaporizhzhia
- Fakel Lypovets
- FC Mynai
- SC Kakhovka
- Rubikon Kyiv

=== Withdrawn teams ===
List of clubs that took part in last year competition, but chose not to participate in 2017–18 season:

- Kovel-Volyn Kovel
- Oskar Pidhiria
- FC Vradiyivka

=== Location map ===
The following displays the location of teams. Group 1 teams marked in red. Group 2 teams marked in green. Group 3 teams marked in blue.

Home venues of teams in the 2017–18 Ukrainian Amateur League.

== Group stage ==
=== Group 1 ===
Pos	Team	Pld	W	D	L	GF	GA	GD	Pts	Comments
1	FC Mynai (P, C)	16	11	4	1	34	9	+25	37	Qualification to play-offs Admission to the 2018–19 Ukrainian Second League
2	Rochyn Sosnivka	16	11	3	2	25	8	+17	36	Qualification to play-offs
3	ODEK Orzhiv	16	10	4	2	33	14	+19	34	Qualification to play-offs
4	Pokuttia Kolomyia	16	7	4	5	20	22	−2	25	
5	FC Kalush (P)	16	7	3	6	16	14	+2	24	Admission to the 2018–19 Ukrainian Second League
6	FC Malynsk	16	5	4	7	26	24	+2	19	
7	Nyva Terebovlya (X)	16	3	2	11	16	19	−3	11	Withdrawn
8	FC Khmelnytskyi	16	2	2	12	15	41	−26	8	
9	Krystal Chortkiv	16	2	2	12	9	43	−34	8	

Updated to match(es) played on 3 June 2018. Source: http://www.aafu.org.ua/
Rules for classification: 1) points; 2) wins; 3) goals difference; 4) goals scored; 5) head-to-head points; 6) head-to-head wins; 7) head-to-head goals difference; 8) goals scored; 9) draw of lots.
(C) Champions; (P) Promotion to the 2018–19 Ukrainian Second League; (X) Withdrew

Notes

- On 7 May 2018, Nyva Terebovlya announced that it withdrew from the competition due to financial issues. The team's record at time of withdrawal was 12 games played, +3=2–7 with goals 16–19.
- On 26 May 2018, FC Khmelnytskyi announced that it won't travel to its scheduled game with FC Mynai.

=== Group 2 ===
Pos	Team	Pld	W	D	L	GF	GA	GD	Pts	Comments
1	Viktoriya Mykolayivka (C)	14	11	3	0	31	10	+21	36	Qualification to play-offs
2	Ahrobiznes TSK Romny	14	10	2	2	30	11	+19	32	Qualification to play-offs
3	Fakel Lypovets	14	6	5	3	28	15	+13	23	
4	Yednist Plysky	14	7	1	6	20	27	−7	22	Withdrawn after the season
5	Chaika P. Borshchahivka (P)	14	4	5	5	14	19	−5	17	Admission to the 2018–19 Ukrainian Second League
6	Avanhard Koryukivka	14	4	2	8	17	19	−2	14	
7	FC Chernihiv	14	2	3	9	10	26	−16	9	Withdrawn after the season
8	Rubikon Kyiv	14	1	1	12	9	32	−23	4	

Updated to match(es) played on 2 June 2018. Source: http://www.aafu.org.ua/
Rules for classification: 1) points; 2) wins; 3) goals difference; 4) goals scored; 5) head-to-head points; 6) head-to-head wins; 7) head-to-head goals difference; 8) goals scored; 9) draw of lots.
(C) Champions; (P) Admission to the 2018–19 Ukrainian Second League

Notes

- Just before the start, there was anticipated participation of FC Zoria-Akademia Biloziria (a farm team of FC Cherkaskyi Dnipro).
- In the winter break, FC Rubikon moved out to Vyshneve, Kyiv Oblast.

=== Group 3 ===
Pos	Team	Pld	W	D	L	GF	GA	GD	Pts	Comments
1	Druzhba Novomykolaivka (C)	16	12	1	3	32	14	+18	37	Qualification to play-offs
2	Krystal Kherson (P)	16	9	4	3	41	15	+26	31	Qualification to play-offs Admission to the 2018–19 Ukrainian Second League
3	Tavria-Skif Rozdol	16	9	4	3	26	14	+12	31	Qualification to play-offs Withdrew after the season
4	MFC Metalurh Zaporizhzhia (P)	16	9	4	3	39	18	+21	31	Admission to the 2018–19 Ukrainian Second League
5	Hirnyk Kryvyi Rih (P)	16	6	2	8	44	35	+9	20	Admission to the 2018–19 Ukrainian Second League
6	SC Kakhovka	16	5	4	7	23	29	−6	19	
7	Yarud Mariupol	16	4	5	7	20	19	+1	17	
8	MFC Pervomaisk	16	3	4	9	16	27	−11	13	
9	Olimpik–SDYuShOR-2 Kropyvnytskyi	16	0	2	14	11	81	−70	2	

Updated to match(es) played on 3 June 2018. Source: http://www.aafu.org.ua/
Rules for classification: 1) points; 2) wins; 3) goals difference; 4) goals scored; 5) head-to-head points; 6) head-to-head wins; 7) head-to-head goals difference; 8) goals scored; 9) draw of lots.
(C) Champions; (P) Promotion to the 2018–19 Ukrainian Second League

Notes

- Just before the start, there was anticipated participation of FC Kolos Askania-Nova (former Kolos Khlibodarivka).
- On 19 May 2018, game between SC Kakhovka and Krystal Kherson was interrupted on the 60th minute due to fans violence.
- MFC Metalurh Zaporizhzhia could not made the play-offs due to worst head-to-head record against Krystal and Tavria-Skif.
  - Krystal H2H rec: 2–1–1
  - Tavria-Skif H2H rec: 1–2–1
  - Metalurh H2H rec: 1–1–2

== Play-off stage ==
Originally post-season competition structure was acknowledged to be defined by the AAFU Commission in conducting competitions at the end of group stage. On 29 May 2018, AAFU published information about its post-season tournament. According to the information published, the tournament will consist of three stages (quarterfinals, semifinals, and final) and all will consist of a single game. A draw will be conducted to identify semifinal pairs.

=== Teams qualified ===
In parentheses are indicated the number of times the club qualified for this phase.

- Group 1: FC Mynai, Rochyn Sosnivka, ODEK Orzhiv (2)
- Group 2: Viktoriya Mykolaivka, Ahrobiznes TSK Romny
- Group 3: Druzhba Novomykolaivka, Krystal Kherson, Tavriya-Skif Rozdol (2)

=== Bracket ===
Quarter-finals
FC Mynai	0 (3)
Tavria-Skif Rozdol (p)	0 (4)
Druzhba Novomykolaivka	1
ODEK Orzhiv (a.e.t.)	2
Viktoriya Mykolaivka	4
Krystal Kherson	0
Ahrobiznes TSK Romny	0
Rochyn Sosnivka	2

Semi-finals
ODEK Orzhiv	0
Tavria-Skif Rozdol (a.e.t.)	1
Viktoriya Mykolaivka	1
Rochyn Sosnivka	0

Final
29 June – Kyiv
Viktoriya Mykolaivka	1
Tavria-Skif Rozdol	0

=== Quarterfinals ===
- Dates: 9, 16, 17 June 2018

Team 1	Score	Team 2
FC Mynai	0–0 (3–4 p)	Tavria-Skif Rozdol
Druzhba Novomykolaivka	1–2 (a.e.t.)	ODEK Orzhiv
Viktoriya Mykolaivka	4–0	Krystal Kherson
Ahrobiznes TSK Romny	0–2	Rochyn Sosnivka

Notes:

- Less than a week later after its quarterfinal game, on 15 June 2018 Ahrobiznes TSK Romny announced that it has been dissolved after it was created back in 2014.
- Eliminated in quarterfinals, both FC Minaj and FC Krystal Kherson also admitted 2018–19 Ukrainian Second League by the PFL at the organization's conference on 27 June 2018.

9 June 2018	Ahrobiznes TSK Romny	0–2	Rochyn Sosnivka	Romny, Sumy Oblast
18:00 LST			Kashuba 1'; Deva 80'; Deva (red card) 90+1'	Stadium: imeni Okipnoho; Attendance: 1,000; Referee: Serhiy Zadiran (Kyiv Oblast)

16 June 2018	Druzhba Novomykolaivka	1–2 (a.e.t.)	ODEK Orzhiv	Kryvyi Rih, Dnipropetrovsk Oblast
18:00 LST	Sokil 74'		Hazytskyi 62'; Tarhoniy 102'	Stadium: Hirnyk; Attendance: 200; Referee: Dmytro Kuzovlyev (Zaporizhzhia)

16 June 2018	Viktoriya Mykolaivka	4–0	Krystal Kherson	Mykolaivka, Sumy Oblast
18:00 LST	Nelin 21' (pen.); Akimov 58' (pen.); Kuzmin 61' (pen.); Ryabtsev 87'		Malysh (yellow card) 19' (yellow-red card) 90'	Stadium: Viktoriya; Attendance: 500; Referee: Ihor Stashuk (Chernihiv)

17 June 2018	FC Minaj	0–0 (a.e.t.) (3–4 p)	Tavria-Skif Rozdol	Mynai, Zakarpattia Oblast
18:00 LST				Stadium: Minaj; Attendance: 700; Referee: Borys Trach (Ternopil)
	Penalties
	Obraztsov (penalty scored); Dopilka (penalty scored); Vahin (penalty missed); Shpak (penalty scored); Kopolovets (penalty missed)		(penalty missed) Koryeshkov; (penalty scored) Sylyuk; (penalty scored) Khomutov; (penalty scored) Nevmyvaka; (penalty scored) Semenenko

All games details by Artur Valerko on SportArena.

=== Semifinals ===
The draw for the round is scheduled to be held on 19 June 2018 in the House of Football, Kyiv. Game date: 24 June 2018.

Team 1	Score	Team 2
ODEK Orzhiv	0–1 (a.e.t.)	Tavria-Skif Rozdol
Viktoriya Mykolaivka	1–0	Rochyn Sosnivka

Notes:

24 June 2018	ODEK Orzhiv	0–1 (a.e.t.)	Tavria-Skif Rozdol	Orzhiv, Rivne Oblast
16:00 LST			Khomutov 95' (pen.)	Stadium: ODEK; Attendance: 500; Referee: Dmytro Kubryak (Odesa)

24 June 2018	Viktoriya Mykolaivka	1–0	Rochyn Sosnivka	Mykolaivka, Sumy Oblast
17:00 LST	Mykhailyuk 50'			Stadium: Viktoriya; Attendance: 300; Referee: Klym Zabroda (Kyiv)

=== Final ===
- Date: 29 June 2018

29 June 2018	Viktoriya Mykolaivka	1–0	Tavria-Skif Rozdol	Kyiv
17:00 LST	Romanenko 1'; Yatsenko (red card) 90+2'; Kiriyenko (red card) 90+2'	Report (footboom); Report (sport arena)	Akopyan (yellow card) 77' (red card) 90+2'; Semenenko (yellow card) 74' (red card) 90+3'	Stadium: imeni Bannikova; Attendance: 500; Referee: Ivan Salash

Notes:

- At the end of the game a shoving between players occurred and the referee ejected several players as well as a head coach of Tavria-Skif Maksym Skorokhodov.

== Number of teams by region ==
Number	Region	Team(s)
3	Chernihiv Oblast	Avanhard Kryukivka, FC Chernihiv, Yednist Plysky
3	Kherson Oblast	Druzhba Novomykolaivka, SC Kakhovka, Krystal Kherson
2	Ivano-Frankivsk Oblast	FC Kalush, Pokuttia Kolomyia
2	Rivne Oblast	FC Malynsk, ODEK Orzhiv
2	Sumy Oblast	Ahrobiznes-TSK Romny, Viktoriya Mykolaivka
2	Ternopil Oblast	Krystal Chortkiv, Nyva Terebovlya
2	Zaporizhia Oblast	Motor Zaporizhia, Tavria-Skif Rozdol
1	Dnipropetrovsk Oblast	Hirnyk Kryvyi Rih
1	Donetsk Oblast	Yarud Mariupol
1	Khmelnytskyi Oblast	FC Khmelnytskyi
1	Kirovohrad Oblast	Olimpik Kropyvnytskyi
1	Kyiv	Rubikon
1	Kyiv Oblast	Chaika Petropavlivska Borshchahivka
1	Lviv Oblast	Rochyn Sosnivka
1	Mykolaiv Oblast	MFC Pervomaisk
1	Vinnytsia Oblast	Fakel Lypovets
1	Zakarpattia Oblast	FC Mynai

== See also ==
- 2017–18 Ukrainian Amateur Cup
- 2017–18 Ukrainian Second League
- 2017–18 Ukrainian First League
- 2017–18 Ukrainian Premier League
