= 2003 Ukrainian Amateur Cup =

2002 Ukrainian Cup among amateurs
Tournament details
- Country: Ukraine

Final positions
- Champions: Yednist Plysky
- Runners-up: ODEK Orzhiv

The 2003 Ukrainian Amateur Cup was the eighth annual season of Ukraine's football knockout competition for amateur football teams. The competition started on 9 August 2003 and concluded on 19 October 2003.

The cup holders Haray Zhovkva were defeated at semifinals by ODEK Orzhiv.

== Participated clubs ==
In bold are clubs that were active at the same season AAFU championship (parallel round-robin competition).

- Autonomous Republic of Crimea: Akademia-IKS Kuybesheve
- Cherkasy Oblast: Yatran Uman
- Chernihiv Oblast: Yednist Plysky
- Donetsk Oblast (3): Pivdenstal Yenakieve, Shakhtar Dzerzhynsk, Shakhtar Rodynske
- Khmelnytskyi Oblast: SC Starokostiantyniv
- Kyiv: **Dnipro Kyiv**
- Luhansk Oblast: Inter Luhansk
- Lviv Oblast: Haray Zhovkva
- Rivne Oblast: ODEK Orzhiv
- Volyn Oblast: **Prylad-LDPU Lutsk**
- Zakarpattia Oblast: Zdorovya Uzhhorod
- Zhytomyr Oblast (2): FC Korosten, Khimmash Korosten

== Bracket ==
The following is the bracket that demonstrates the last four rounds of the Ukrainian Cup, including the final match. Numbers in parentheses next to the match score represent the results of a penalty shoot-out.

Round of 16
Zdorovya Uzhhorod	0	0	0
**Haray Zhovkva**	0	**3**	**3**
SC Starokostiantyniv	**1**	1	2
**FC Korosten**	0	**4**	**4**
Prylad-LDPU Lutsk	1	0	1
**ODEK Orzhiv**	**5**	**2**	**7**
**Khimmash Korosten**	**1**	**1**	**2**
Yatran Uman	0	0	0
Dnipro Kyiv	**1**	0	1
**Yednist Plysky**	0	**4**	**4**
Shakhtar Dzerzhynsk	**1**	0	1
**Inter Luhansk**	0	**2**	**2**
**Akademia-IKS Kuybesheve**	**1**	0	**1 (4)**
Shakhtar Rodynske	0	**1**	1 (3)

Quarter-finals
**Haray Zhovkva**	**1**	0	**1**
FC Korosten	0	0	0
**ODEK Orzhiv**	**2**	**1**	**3**
Khimmash Korosten	0	0	0
**Yednist Plysky**	**1**	0	**1**
Inter Luhansk	0	0	0
Akademia-IKS Kuybesheve	2	0	2
**Pivdenstal Yenakieve**	**3**	**3**	**6**

Semi-finals
Haray Zhovkva	**2**	0	2
**ODEK Orzhiv** (a)	1	**1**	**2**
**Yednist Plysky**	**3**	**3**	**6**
Pivdenstal Yenakieve	0	2	2

Final
ODEK Orzhiv	0	0	0
**Yednist Plysky**	0	**2**	**2**

== Competition schedule ==
=== First round (1/8) ===
Team 1	Agg.	Team 2	1st leg	2nd leg
Zdorovya Uzhhorod	0 – 3	**Haray Zhovkva**	0–0	0–3
SC Starokostiantyniv	2 – 4	**FC Korosten**	1–0	1–4
Prylad-LDPU Lutsk	1 – 7	**ODEK Orzhiv**	1–5	0–2
**Khimmash Korosten**	2 – 0	Yatran Uman	1–0	1–0
Dnipro Kyiv	1 – 4	**Yednist Plysky**	1–0	0–4
Shakhtar Dzerzhynsk	1 – 2	**Inter Luhansk**	1–0	0–2
**Academy-X Kuybesheve**	1 – 1 (4–3 p)	Shakhtar Rodynske	1–0	0–1 (a.e.t.)

=== Quarterfinals (1/4) ===
This year only Pivdenstal Yenakieve received a bye to quarterfinals.

Team 1	Agg.	Team 2	1st leg	2nd leg
**Haray Zhovkva**	1 – 0	FC Korosten	1–0	0–0
**ODEK Orzhiv**	3 – 0	Khimmash Korosten	2–0	1–0
**Yednist Plysky**	1 – 0	Inter Luhansk	1–0	0–0
Academy-X Kuybesheve	2 – 6	**Pivdenstal Yenakieve**	2–3	0–3

=== Semifinals (1/2) ===
Team 1	Agg.	Team 2	1st leg	2nd leg
Haray Zhovkva	2 – 2 (a)	**ODEK Orzhiv**	2–1	0–1
**Yednist Plysky**	6 – 2	Pivdenstal Yenakieve	3–0	3–2

=== Final ===
Team 1	Agg.	Team 2	1st leg	2nd leg
ODEK Orzhiv	0 – 2	**Yednist Plysky**	0–0	0–2

Winner of the 2003 Ukrainian Football Cup among amateur teams
**Yednist Plysky (Chernihiv Oblast)**; **1st time**

== See also ==
- 2003 Ukrainian Football Amateur League
- 2003–04 Ukrainian Cup
