= 2012 Ukrainian Amateur Cup =

2012 Ukrainian Cup among amateurs
Tournament details
- Country: Ukraine
- Teams: 18

Final positions
- Champions: Nove Zhyttia Andriyivka
- Runners-up: ODEK Orzhiv

The 2012 Ukrainian Amateur Cup marked the seventeenth annual season of Ukraine's football knockout competition for amateur teams. It began on August 15, 2012, and concluded on November 4, 2012.

The defending champions, FC Bucha, did not participate.

== Participated clubs ==
In bold are clubs that were active at the same season AAFU championship (parallel round-robin competition).

- AR Crimea: **Hvardiyets Hvardiyske**
- Cherkasy Oblast (2): **Retro Vatutine**, Zorya Biloziria
- Chernihiv Oblast: LKT Chernihiv
- Chernivtsi Oblast: Pidhiria Storozhynets
- Ivano-Frankivsk Oblast: Karpaty Yaremche
- Kherson Oblast: Kolos Khlibodarivka
- Khmelnytskyi Oblast: Zbruch Volochysk
- Kirovohrad Oblast: Burevisnyk Petrove
- Kyiv Oblast (2): Dinaz Vyshhorod, Dynamo Fastiv
- Mykolaiv Oblast: **Torpedo Mykolaiv**
- Odesa Oblast (2): **Sovinyon Tairove**, **Tarutyne**
- Poltava Oblast: **Nove Zhyttia Andriivka**
- Rivne Oblast: **ODEK Orzhiv**
- Zhytomyr Oblast (2): Avanhard Novohrad-Volynskyi, Zorya-Enerhia Romaniv

== Bracket ==
The following is the bracket that demonstrates the last four rounds of the Ukrainian Cup, including the final match. Numbers in parentheses next to the match score represent the results of a penalty shoot-out.

Round of 16
Pidhiria Storozhynets	1	0	1
**ODEK Orzhiv**	**2**	**1**	**3**
**Karpaty Yaremche**	**3**	0	**3**
Zbruch Volochysk	1	**1**	2
**LKT Chernihiv**	**2**	1	**3**
Dinaz Vyshhorod	0	1	1
Zorya-Enerhiya Romaniv	1	1	2
**Zoria Biloziria**	1	**4**	**5**
Dynamo-Fastiv	0	0	0
**Retro Vatutine**	**3**	0	**3**
**Nove Zhyttia Andriyivka**	**4**	1	**5**
Kolos Khlibodarivka	0	1	1
**Hvardiyets Hvardiyske**	**5**	**3**	**8**
Torpedo Mykolaiv	0	1	1
FC Tarutyne	**3**	1	4
**Savinyon Tayirove** (a)	2	**2**	**4**

Quarter-finals
**ODEK Orzhiv** (a)	0	2	**2**
Karpaty Yaremche	0	2	2
**LKT Chernihiv**	1	**2**	**3**
Zorya Biloziria	1	1	2
Retro Vatutine	1	-	-
**Nove Zhyttia Andriyivka**	**5**	+	+
**Hvardiyets Hvardiyske**	2	**1**	**3**
Savinyon Tayirove	2	0	2

Semi-finals
**ODEK Orzhiv**	**2**	**2**	**4**
LKT Chernihiv	1	0	1
**Nove Zhyttia Andriyivka**	**1**	0	**1**
Hvardiyets Hvardiyske	0	0	0

Final
ODEK Orzhiv	1	1	2
**Nove Zhyttia Andriyivka**	1	**2**	**3**

== Competition schedule ==
=== First qualification round ===
Team 1	Agg.	Team 2	1st leg	2nd leg
**LKT Chernihiv**	4 – 1	Avanhard Novohrad-Volynsky	3–1	1–0
**Kolos Khlibodarivka**	3 – 0	Burevisnyk Petrove	2–0	1–0

=== Second qualification round ===
Team 1	Agg.	Team 2	1st leg	2nd leg
Pidhiria Storozhynets	1 – 3	**ODEK Orzhiv**	1–2	0–1
**Karpaty Yaremche**	3 – 2	Zbruch Volochysk	3–1	0–1
**LKT Chernihiv**	3 – 1	Dinaz Vyshhorod	2–0	1–1
Zorya-Enerhiya Romaniv	2 – 5	**Zoria Biloziria**	1–1	1–4
Dynamo-Fastiv	0 – 3	**Retro Vatutine**	0–3	0–0
**Nove Zhyttia Andriyivka**	5 – 1	Kolos Khlibodarivka	4–0	1–1
**Hvardiyets Hvardiyske**	8 – 1	Torpedo Mykolaiv	5–0	3–1
Tarutyne	4 – 4 (a)	**Savinyon Tayirove**	3–2	1–2

=== Quarterfinals (1/4) ===
Team 1	Agg.	Team 2	1st leg	2nd leg
**ODEK Orzhiv**	2 – 2 (a)	Karpaty Yaremche	0–0	2–2
**LKT Chernihiv**	3 – 2	Zorya Biloziria	1–1	2–1
Retro Vatutine	w / o	**Nove Zhyttia Andriyivka**	1–5	-/+
**Hvardiyets Hvardiyske**	3 – 2	Savinyon Tayirove	2–2	1–0

=== Semifinals (1/2) ===
Team 1	Agg.	Team 2	1st leg	2nd leg
**ODEK Orzhiv**	4 – 1	LKT Chernihiv	2–1	2–0
**Nove Zhyttia Andriyivka**	1 – 0	Hvardiyets Hvardiyske	1–0	0–0

=== Final ===
Team 1	Agg.	Team 2	1st leg	2nd leg
ODEK Orzhiv	2 – 3	**Nove Zhyttia Andriyivka**	1–1	1–2 (a.e.t.)

Winner of the 2012 Ukrainian Football Cup among amateur teams
**Nove Zhyttia Andriyivka (Poltava Oblast)**; **1st time**

== See also ==
- 2012 Ukrainian Football Amateur League
- 2012–13 Ukrainian Cup
