= FC Yednist Plysky =

- Full name: FC Yednist Plysky
- Founded: 2001
- Ground: Yednist Stadium
- Capacity: 1,050
- Chairman: Oleksandr Vasyliovych Popovych
- Manager: Vacant
- League: Ukrainian Amateur Championship (4th level)

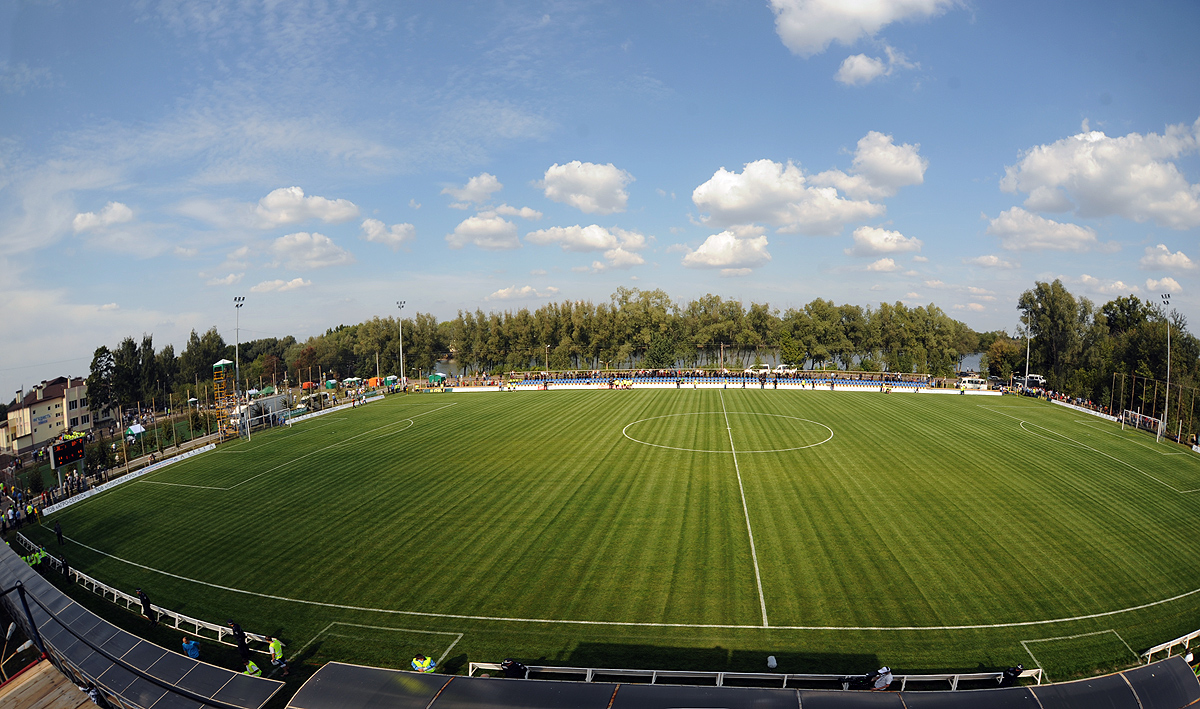
Yednist Stadium (no later than 2014)

FC Yednist Plysky was a Ukrainian professional football team from the village of Plysky in Nizhyn Raion of Chernihiv Oblast. The club continues to play in the Chernihiv Oblast football competition.

== Club history ==
The club was founded in 2001 and is sponsored by a local farming company Ahroservis.

Yednist began participating in the Ukrainian Second League from 2005. The club took the move of entering the professional competition after several years of successfully competing in the Amateur competitions (Fourth Level of competition in Ukraine) including winning the Ukrainian Amateur Cup in 2003.

The reserve club, FC Yednist-2 Plysky, competes in the Chernihivska oblast football competition proved the strength of the club by winning the Ukrainian Amateur Cup in 2007. The PFL has allowed FC Yednist-2 Plysky to compete in the Ukrainian Cup 2008-09 even though Reserves or 2nd teams have not been allowed to compete in the competition since 2001.

After the completion of the First Stage of the 2012–13 Ukrainian Second League season the club withdrew from the Professional Football League. The Vice President of the club informed that the club would return to the amateur leagues citing that there was no financial incentive to play in the second stage of the competition.

The club currently competes in the Chernihivska oblast football competition and also continues to compete in the Ukrainian Amateur championships since leaving the professional leagues.

== First squad honours ==
Ukrainian Amateur Football Championship

- Winners (1): 2004

Ukrainian Amateur Cup

- Winners (1): 2003
- Runner-Up (1): 2013

Chernihiv Oblast Football Championship

- Winners (5): 2005, 2014, 2015

Chernihiv Oblast Football Cup

- Winners (1): 2005, 2014, 2015

Chernihiv Oblast Super Cup:

- Winners (1): 2014

== League and cup history ==
Season	Div.	Pos.	Pl.	W	D	L	GS	GA	P	Domestic Cup	Europe	Notes
2004	4th	1	8	6	1	1	27	8	19			
2004	4th	1	4	3	1	0	17	6	10			
2004	4th	2	3	2	1	0	6	1	7			Third place
2005–06	3rd "B"	7	28	10	8	10	38	36	38	1/32 finals		
2006–07	3rd "A"	3	28	16	6	6	50	24	54	1/32 finals		
2007–08	3rd "A"	5	30	15	6	9	50	36	51	1/16 finals		
2008–09	3rd "A"	12	32	12	4	16	30	40	40	1/32 finals		
2009–10	3rd "A"	6	20	8	5	7	22	11	29	1/8 finals		
2010–11	3rd "A"	8	22	10	2	10	39	26	32	1/16 finals		
2011–12	3rd "A"	13	26	3	6	17	19	57	15	Did not enter		
2012–13	3rd "A"	7	20	5	5	10	17	30	20	1/64 finals		Withdrew
2014	4th	4	10	2	2	6	7	16	8			
2015	4th	2	6	3	0	3	12	7	9			
2015	4th	4	10	3	2	5	15	17	11			
2015	4th	3	3	1	1	1	2	4	4			
2016	4th	1	6	4	1	1	14	6	13			
2016	4th	QF	2	0	1	1	2	3	1			
2016–17	4th	3	20	9	6	5	22	22	33			
2017–18	4th											

== Reserves and the academy ==
=== Yednist-2 Plysky ===
Yednist-2 Plysky
- Full name: Yednist-2 Plysky
- Chairman: Oleksandr Popovych
- Manager: Serhiy Bakun
- League: Amateur Association

Yednist-2 was a second (reserve) squad of Yednist Plysky playing at the amateur level and regional competitions. It entered the Ukrainian Cup competition in 2008, which was a major exclusion to the Ukrainian football regulations that state that no club can enter the Cup competition with multiple teams. The FFU has made the exclusion as the team has won the Amateur Cup in the previous year does not hold the professional license. They were permitted to participate in the Ukrainian Cup as the autonomous entity of the Yednist Plysky. In the 2007 and 2008 seasons, the team has been one of the runners behind Bastion and Luzhany, respectively.

Season	Div.	Pos.	Pl.	W	D	L	GS	GA	P	Domestic Cup	Europe		Notes
2007	4th	1	8	4	1	3	16	15	13				
2007	4th	1	1	1	0	0	2	0	3				
2007	4th	1	2	2	0	0	4	2	6				Lost final
2008	4th	2	8	5	2	1	17	11	17	1/32 finals			
2008	4th	2	3	1	2	0	2	1	5	1/32 finals			
2009	4th	1	6	5	0	1	15	5	15				
2009	4th	1	3	2	1	0	5	2	7				Champions
2010	4th	2	6	3	0	3	12	7	9				
2010	4th	2	3	2	0	1	10	4	6				
2011	4th	3	10	5	1	4	14	17	16		RC	Final Group stage	Lost playoffs

=== Yednist Plysky (women) ===
Yednist Plysky was a women's football team of Yednist Plysky. In 2016, Spartak Chernihiv became a champion of the First League, but instead of receiving promotion, the football team was adopted by FC Yednist Plysky and entered the 2017 Ukrainian Women's Top League.

In 2018, the women's team of Yednist Plysky changed its name to Yednist ShVSM after the withdrawal of another Ukrainian women's football club Lehenda Chernihiv. The regional school of higher sports mastery (ShVSM), which is part of the Chernihiv Oblast department of education, signed a new cooperation agreement with another football club in Chernihiv Oblast after the withdrawal of Lehenda. In 2020, FC Yednist Plysky ceased its operation, and for the ShVSM, a new club was created based on the Chernihiv sports school Yunist under the name of Yunist-ShVSM Chernihiv.

== Managers ==
=== Yednist Plysky ===
- 2005 Viktor Hryshchenko
- 2006–2007 Anatoliy Murakhovskyi
- 2008 Vadym Dyord
- 2009–2011 Vadym Lazorenko
  - 2010 Vadym Mandriyevskyi (interim)
- 2011 Volodymyr Stetsyuk
- 2012 Vitaly Levchenko
- 2012–2013 Anatoliy Murakhovskyi
- 2014–2015 Kostyantyn Sakharov
- 2015–2016 Vitaliy Belokon
- 2016–2017 Yuriy Len
- 2017 Illya Blyznyuk
- 2017–2018 Ihor Prodan

=== Yednist-2 Plysky ===
- 2009–2011 Serhiy Bakun
- 2011 Volodymyr Stetsyuk
- 2012 Vadym Shelmenko

=== Yednist Plysky (women) ===
- 2017–2018 Nataliya Ihnatovych
- 2018 Roman Zayev
- 2019 Volodymyr Kulyk
- 2019 Oleksandr Babor
- 2020 Maksym Rakhayev
