= Bairak, Romny Raion, Sumy Oblast =

Bairak Байрак
- Village
- Location within Ukraine Location within Sumy Oblast
- Coordinates: 50°36′05″N 33°40′53″E
- Country: Ukraine
- Oblast: Sumy Oblast
- Raion: Romny Raion
- Established: first half of 19th century

Population
  - Total: 734
- Time zone: UTC+02:00 (EET)
  - Summer (DST): UTC+03:00 (EEST)
- Postal index: 42540
- Area code: +380 5452

Bairak (Ukrainian: Байрак) is a village in Sumy Oblast (province) of eastern Ukraine with a population of 734.

== Gallery ==
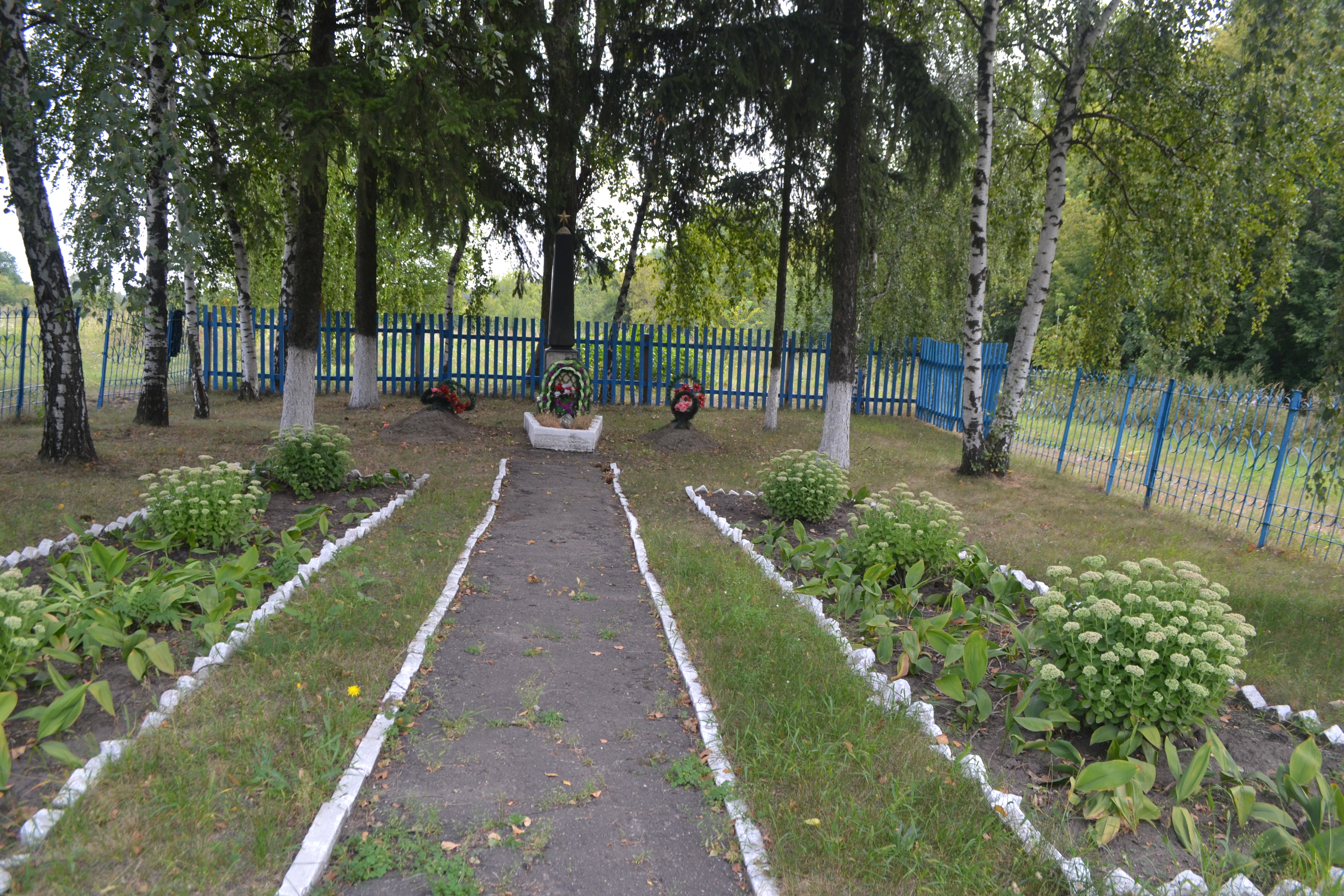
Mass (fraternal) burial of Soviet warriors near Bairak
