= FC Olimpik Kropyvnytskyi =

Ukrainian football club

- Full name: FC Olimpik Kropyvnytskyi
- Founded: 2000
- Ground: Zirka Stadium
- Manager: Yuriy Kevlich
- League: Regional championship of Kirovohrad Oblast
Home colours

Old logo

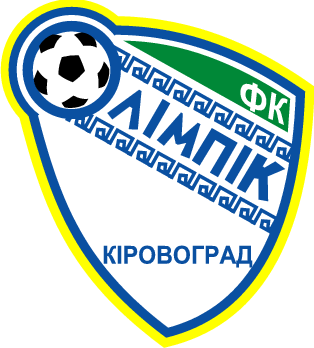
another version

FC Olimpik Kropyvnytskyi (Ukrainian: Олімпік) is an amateur football club based in Kropyvnytskyi, Ukraine. Before 2015 it was known as FC Olimpik Kirovohrad. The club regularly participates in the Kirovohrad Oblast Football Championship. In 2007–08 it played at the Ukrainian Second League.

== History ==
Olimpik Kropyvnytskyi entered the profession ranks in 2007 competing in the Druha Liha B. Their games were played at Zirka Stadium which used to be the property of the once famous club FC Zirka Kropyvnytskyi. The president and the head coach is Yuriy Kevlich.

On July 16, 2008, the club made swap with FC Zirka Kropyvnytskyi and continued on the amateur level.

== League and cup history ==
Season	Div.	Pos.	Pl.	W	D	L	GS	GA	P	Domestic Cup	Other		Notes
2007	4th	4	6	1	0	5	3	22	3				
2007–08	3rd "B"	17	34	6	7	21	33	66	25	1/64 finals			
2008	refer to FC Zirka Kirovohrad										UAC	1st Qual Round	
2009	4th	4	6	0	0	6	3	15	0		UAC	1st Qual Round	
2010	4th	5	8	2	0	6	7	21	6		UAC	1st Qual Round	
2011	4th	6	10	0	3	7	3	22	3		UAC	1st Qual Round	
2012	4th	5	3	0	0	3	1	10	0				withdrew, annulled
2013	regional competitions												
2014	4th	4	6	0	0	6	4	29	0				
2015–17 in regional competitions
2017–18	4th	9	16	0	2	14	11	81	2				
2018–19	4th	11	13	1	1	11	9	52	4				

== Notable players ==
- Ihor Zahalskyi
- Oleksandr Kochura
- Yevhen Konoplyanka (youth)

== See also ==
- FC Zirka Kropyvnytskyi
- Kirovohrad Oblast Football Federation
