= FC ODEK Orzhiv =

ODEK Orzhiv
- Full name: Football Club ODEK Orzhiv
- Ground: ODEK-Ukraina, Orzhiv
- Capacity: 850
- Chairman: Myron Chernetskyi
- Manager: Oleh Shandruk
- League: Ukrainian Amateur League
- 2020–21: Ukrainian Amateur League, Group 1, 2nd of 9
- Website: https://www.fcodek.org/

Football Club ODEK Orzhiv (Ukrainian: ОДЕК Оржів) is a Ukrainian amateur football team from Orzhiv, Rivne Raion. In 2013 the team won the National amateur football championship.

Previously in 1972–1994 Orzhiv was represented by another football team Fakel that before 1983 was known as Derevoobrobnyk. In 2001 the local Orhziv Wood Processing Factory (abbreviated as ODEK) revived its team.

== Honours ==
- Ukrainian football championship among amateurs
  - Winner(s) (1): 2013
  - Third(s) (5): 2005, 2010 (shared), 2014 (shared), 2015 (shared), 2016 (shared),
- Ukrainian Amateur Cup
  - Runner(s)-up (2): 2003, 2012
- Rivne Oblast championship
  - Winner(s) (8): 2002, 2003, 2004, 2006, 2007, 2008, 2011, 2013
- Rivne Oblast cup
  - Winner(s) (8): 2001, 2003, 2004, 2006, 2007, 2009, 2010, 2014

== Players ==
=== Current squad ===
As of 30 October 2021

Note: Flags indicate national team as defined under FIFA eligibility rules; some limited exceptions apply. Players may hold more than one non-FIFA nationality.

| No. / Pos. / Nation / Player; 17 / FW / UKR / Vitaliy Bohdanov | No. / Pos. / Nation / Player |

== League and cup history ==
| Season | Div. | Pos. | Pl. | W | D | L | GS | GA | P | Amateur Cup | Europe | | Notes |
|---|---|---|---|---|---|---|---|---|---|---|---|---|---|
| 2004 | 4th | 3 | 8 | 4 | 1 | 3 | 12 | 9 | 13 | | | | |
| 2005 | 4th | 3 | 10 | 4 | 3 | 3 | 13 | 14 | 15 | | | | |
| 2005 | 4th | 3 | 4 | 1 | 1 | 2 | 8 | 9 | 4 | | | | |
| 2006 | did not participate | | | | | | | | | | | | |
| 2007 | 4th | 4 | 8 | 2 | 3 | 3 | 10 | 11 | 9 | | | | |
| 2008 | 4th | 1 | 8 | 4 | 4 | 0 | 11 | 6 | 16 | | | | |
| 2008 | 4th | 7 | 3 | 0 | 1 | 2 | 3 | 7 | 1 | | | | |
| 2009 | 4th | 3 | 6 | 1 | 2 | 3 | 5 | 8 | 5 | | | | |
| 2010 | 4th | 3 | 8 | 4 | 2 | 2 | 14 | 11 | 14 | | | | |
| 2010 | 4th | 3/4 | 2 | 1 | 1 | 0 | 5 | 2 | 4 | | | | |
| 2011 | 4th | 3 | 13 | 7 | 2 | 4 | 27 | 14 | 23 | | | | |
| 2011 | 4th | 5/6 | 3 | 0 | 2 | 1 | 3 | 6 | 2 | | | | |
| 2012 | 4th | 1 | 10 | 9 | 0 | 1 | 20 | 5 | 27 | | | | |
| 2012 | 4th | 5/6 | 3 | 1 | 0 | 2 | 3 | 3 | 3 | | | | |
| 2013 | 4th | 2 | 10 | 7 | 1 | 2 | 15 | 10 | 22 | | | | |
| 2013 | 4th | 1 | 4 | 2 | 1 | 1 | 6 | 2 | 7 | | | | |
| 2014 | 4th | 2 | 8 | 4 | 2 | 2 | 13 | 9 | 14 | | | | |
| 2014 | 4th | 3/4 | 3 | 2 | 0 | 1 | 4 | 1 | 6 | | | | |
| 2015 | 4th | 3 | 6 | 2 | 2 | 2 | 7 | 6 | 8 | | | | |
| 2015 | 4th | 5 | 10 | 2 | 4 | 4 | 10 | 17 | 10 | | | | |
| 2015 | 4th | 3/4 | 3 | 1 | 1 | 1 | 2 | 1 | 4 | | | | |
| 2016 | 4th | 1 | 6 | 5 | 1 | 0 | 18 | 1 | 16 | | AL | Semifinalist | |
| 2016–17 | 4th | 4 | 20 | 12 | 1 | 7 | 34 | 18 | 37 | | | | |
| 2017–18 | 4th | | | | | | | | | | | | |
