= FC Solli Plyus Kharkiv =

- Founded: 1966
- Owner: Solli+

FC Solli Plyus Kharkiv (Ukrainian: Соллі Плюс) is an amateur club from Kharkiv competing at the regional competitions of Kharkiv Oblast.

The club originally was founded in 1966 as Elektrotyazhmash Kharkiv at the Eletrotyazhmash Factory, but eventually the team was dissolved. In 2010, it was revived again.

In 2016, the club lost its original sponsor and was bought by another company Solli+. The club renamed as FC Solli Plyus Kharkiv.

== Honours ==
Ukrainian football championship among amateurs

Football championship of Kharkiv Oblast

- Winners (1): 2016
- Runners-up (0):

Holder of the Kharkiv Oblast Football Cup

- Winners (0):
