= Fedir Shpyh =

Ukrainian politician (1956–2020)

Fedir Shpyh Федір Шпиг
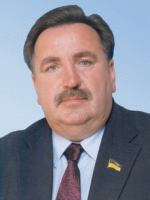
- Sphyh in 2006

People's Deputy of Ukraine
- In office 12 May 1998 – 14 May 2002
- Preceded by: reorganized
- Succeeded by: himself
- In office 14 May 2002 – 25 May 2006
- Preceded by: himself
- Succeeded by: reorganized
- In office 25 May 2006 – 15 June 2007

Personal details
- Born: Fedir Ivanovych Shpyh; 30 January 1956 Kobyzhcha, Bobrovytsia Raion, Chernihiv Oblast, Ukrainian SSR, Soviet Union
- Died: 31 March 2020 (aged 64) Romanivka, Zviahel Raion, Zhytomyr Oblast, Ukraine
- Party: Our Ukraine
- Education: Kyiv Shipbuilding Vocational School; Kyiv Institute of National Economy
- Occupation: banker politician

Fedir Ivanovych Shpyh (Ukrainian: Федір Іванович Шпиг; born 30 January 1956 - 31 March 2020) was a Ukrainian banker, football functionary, and politician.

== Biography ==
Shpyh started his career as designer-technician at the Leninska Kuznia (today Kuznya na Rybalskomu) central design bureau in 1972, while studying at the Kyiv Shipbuilding Vocational School. After his service in the Soviet army (1976–78), he returned to LK working as technology engineer. In 1979–82 Shpyh worked as a senior technology engineer at furniture association "Brovarymebli". In 1982–91 he was a Komsomol activist working in particular as a head of affairs for the Central Committee of the Lenin's Youth Communist League of Ukraine (LKSMU). During this time in 1984 Shpyh also graduated the Kyiv Institute of National Economy as economist and defended his candidate dissertation "Management of a commercial bank operation".

Following dissolution of the Soviet Union, in 1991 Shpyh became a head of credit resources department in one of the first commercial banks in Ukraine "INKO". In March 1992 he established own bank known as "Aval" which since 2005 is a regional branch of the Austrian bank giant Raiffeisen. In 1999–2007 Shpyh was a member of the National Bank of Ukraine (NBU) council. In 1997 he was awarded the official title of Merited Economist of Ukraine.

In 1998 Shpyh was appointed the president of the newly organized football organization Ukrainian Football Amateur Association (AAFU), which created by the Football Federation of Ukraine organizes national amateur football competitions. He also was awarded the state order "of Merit", the 3rd degree.

In 1998 Shpyh ran for the national parliament at the 1998 Ukrainian parliamentary election as an independent politician at the 210 electoral district in Chernihiv Oblast and won it. At the time of elections he still was a director of bank "Aval". In the parliament he first joined the pro-presidential parliamentary faction of People's Democratic Party, but soon in 1999 switched to parliamentary group Labour Ukraine. As parliamentarian in 1998–2002 Shpyh also was a member of parliamentary committee on matters of finances and bank operations. In 2001 he was awarded the state order "of Merit", the 2nd degree.

In 2002 Shpyh again ran for parliament in the 2002 Ukrainian parliamentary election as an independent politician in the 210th electoral district in Chernihiv Oblast and won.
