= FC Ivan Odesa =

FC Ivan Odesa is an amateur Ukrainian football club from Odesa. Ivan plays at the Ivan Stadium.

The club was founded in 1998 and at first was representing the village of Nerubaiske, Biliaivka Raion. Between 2003–2007 it played at the national amateur competitions and the 2007 UEFA Regions' Cup.

== Honours ==
- Ukrainian football championship among amateurs
  - Winner(s) (1): 2005
- Odesa Oblast cup
  - Winner(s) (1): 2004
