= SC Kakhovka =

Kakhovka
- Full name: Sports Club Kakhovka
- Founded: 1980 (original); 2006 (current)
- Ground: Olympic Stadium, Kakhovka
- Capacity: 1 540
- Chairman: Yuriy Pasichnychenko
- Manager: Dmytro Kuznyetsov
- League: Ukrainian Amateur League
- 2021–22: Ukrainian Amateur League, Group 3, 7th of 9

Sports Club Kakhovka (Ukrainian: Спортивний клуб «Каховка») is a Ukrainian amateur football club from Kakhovka, Kherson Oblast. The club currently plays at the Askaniyske Experimental Facility Stadium. Throughout its history the club is better known for its names as Meliorator and Kzeso.

== Brief history ==
The club was established sometime in 1980 as Avanhard Kakhovka. In 1988 after winning a prize of the local newspaper "Robitnycha Hazeta" (Worker's Gazette), it received a sponsor Agro-Industrial Complex "Krasa Khersonshchyny" (Beauty of the Kherson Region) and was renamed as Meliorator Kakhovka (Land cultivator). The club joined the Ukrainian competitions in 1992. In 1995 it lost its main sponsor and changed to FC Kakhovka. However that season was the most terrible and after the first half, the club withdrew from competitions as the city authorities could find means to continue funding the team.

Later in 1999 the club returned to regional competitions as Chumak Kakhovka being sponsored by the Swedish-Ukrainian company Chumak. In 2001 the club was sold to the Kakhovka Factory of Electrical Welding Equipment (KZEZO or Kzeso in Russian interpretation) and in 2002 it joined the amateur competitions. From 2002 to 2005 KZEZO quite successfully competed at the amateur league winning the league twice and qualified to the UEFA Regions Cup where it earned the third place. In 2006 the club was dissolved and reformed again as SC Kakhovka.

== Previous names ==
First club (1980–2006):

- 1980–1988: Avanhard Kakhovka (Ukrainian: «Авангард» Каховка)
- 1988–1995: Meliorator Kakhovka (Ukrainian: «Меліоратор» Каховка)
- 1995–1999: FC Kakhovka (Ukrainian: ФК «Каховка»)
- 1999–2001: Chumak Kakhovka (Ukrainian: «Чумак» Каховка)
- 2001–2006: KZEZO Kakhovka (Ukrainian: «КЗЕЗО» Каховка)

Second club (since 2006):

- 2006–2011: SC Kakhovka (Ukrainian: СК «Каховка»)
- 2017–present: SC Kakhovka (Ukrainian: СК «Каховка»)

== Honours ==
- UEFA Regions' Cup

2005

- Ukrainian football championship among amateurs (Ukrainian 4th Tier)

2002, 2004
2003

- Kherson Oblast football championship (Ukrainian Lower Tier)

1988, 1999, 2001, 2002, 2004

== League and cup history ==
=== Soviet Union ===
Season	Div.	Pos.	Pl.	W	D	L	GS	GA	P	Domestic Cup	Europe	Notes
Meliorator Kakhovka
1989	4th KFK Ukrainian SSR Gr. 4	3_{/13}	24	14	4	6	43	19	32			Reorganization of competitions
1990	5th KFK Ukrainian SSR Gr. 5	2_{/16}	30	21	5	4	61	18	47			
1991	5th KFK Ukrainian SSR Gr. 4	2_{/16}	30	21	5	4	73	27	47			Reorganization of competitions

=== Ukraine ===
Season	Div.	Pos.	Pl.	W	D	L	GS	GA	P	Domestic Cup	Europe	Notes
1992	3rd Transitional League Gr. B	3_{/9}	16	8	5	3	21	16	21			
1992–93	3rd Second League	5_{/18}	34	16	9	9	45	37	41	1/32 finals		
1993–94	3rd Second League	6_{/22}	42	18	12	12	56	37	48	1/32 finals		
1994–95	3rd Second League	9_{/22}	42	21	9	12	49	40	72	1/32 finals		
FC Kakhovka
1995–96	3rd Second League Gr. A	21_{/22}	40	3	3	34	11	49	12	1/128 finals		Withdrew
...
KZEZO (KZESO) Kakhovka
2002	4th Amateur League Gr. D	1_{/4}	6	6	0	0	13	1	18			Final group (1_{/4})
2003	4th Amateur League Gr. E	1_{/5}	8	6	1	1	18	11	19			Final group (2_{/4})
2004	4th Amateur League Gr. E	1_{/4}	4	2	1	1	8	2	7			Final (Winners)
2005	4th Amateur League Gr. 3	2_{/5}	6	3	0	3	10	10	9			
...
SC Kakhovka
2017–18	4th Amateur League Gr. 3	6_{/9}	16	5	4	7	23	29	19			
2018–19	4th Amateur League Gr. 3	4_{/12}	22	10	7	5	32	18	37			
2019–20	4th Amateur League Gr. 3	5_{/10}	18	10	3	5	32	24	33			
2020–21	4th Amateur League Gr. 3	7_{/12}	22	9	3	10	35	26	30			
2021–22	4th Amateur League Gr. 3	7_{/9}	8	2	1	5	8	23	7			
