= FC Sokil Berezhany =

FC Sokil Berezhany (formerly FC Lysonya) is a Ukrainian football club based in Berezhany, Ternopil Oblast that was active from 1980s to late 2000s predominantly at the amateur level. The club was established as a spin-off after Nyva Berezhany moved to Ternopil, becoming Nyva Ternopil, while Berezhany was left with another team competing among "collectives of physical culture" (KFK).

== History ==
The football team from Berezhany competed at the national (republican) level since 1965, when Kolhospnyk Berezhany debuted at the football championship of the Ukrainian SSR among the KFK teams.

In 1983, Nyva Berezhany was admitted to the Soviet competitions and later in 1985 moved to Ternopil, becoming FC Nyva Ternopil. Right away, another Nyva Pidhaitsi was created and entered competitions once again in 1984. Next season, this team moved to Berezhany, becoming Nyva Berezhany once again.

In 1992, the club played in the Ukrainian Transfer League under the name "Lysonya" (named so after the mountain near Berezhany), but after two seasons the club was renamed to Sokil (Ukrainian for "Falcon") and returned to amateur football.

In 1998, the team won the Cup of Ternopil Oblast. Sokil played two matches in Ukrainian Second League of 2005–06 season, but withdrew.

The team were the champions of Ternopil Oblast in 2000 and 2001, while they finished second in 2009.

== Honours ==
- Ternopil Oblast Football Championship
  - Winners (3): 2000, 2001, 2012

== League and cup history ==
Season	Div.	Pos.	Pl.	W	D	L	GS	GA	P	Domestic Cup	Europe	Notes
Nyva Pidhaitsi
1984	4	2	14	8	1	5	12	22	17			moved to Berezhany
Nyva Berezhany
1985	4	2	14	7	4	3	24	10	18			
1986	4	1	16	10	3	3	23	11	23			Qualified for the final group
1986	4	4	5	2	0	3	5	8	4			
1987	4	5	14	5	4	5	19	17	14			
1988	4	1	18	12	4	2	29	16	28			Qualified for the final group
1988	4	6	5	0	3	2	3	6	3			
1989	4	2	22	15	4	3	37	13	34			
1990	4	3	30	16	8	6	47	23	40			
1991	4	1	28	20	7	1	47	11	47			Qualified for the final group
1991	4	4	5	2	0	3	4	6	4			Admitted to Transitional League
Lysonia Berezhany (transitioned to national competitions)
1992	3	8	16	2	6	8	14	21	10			Relegated to lower tier
1992–93	3 (lower)	16	34	7	9	18	20	53	23			Relegated
Sokil Berezhany
1993–94	4	10	22	5	6	11	12	29	16			
Lysonia Berezhany
2001	4	2	6	2	2	2	6	6	8			to Second Stage
2001	4	6	10	0	2	8	2	10	2			eliminated
2002	4	4	8	3	1	4	11	8	10			eliminated
Sokil Berezhany
2004	4	2	8	4	2	2	14	8	14			refused next stage
2005	4	4	10	4	2	4	10	7	14			applied for Second League
2005–06	3	X	2	0	1	1	1	8	1	Q1 round		withdrew, results annulled
2008	4	5	8	1	1	6	7	8	4			withdrew

== See also ==
- FC Nyva Ternopil, formerly as Nyva Berezhany
