= FC Motor Zaporizhzhia =

Association football club in Zaporizhzhia, Ukraine

Motor
- Full name: FC Motor Zaporizhzhia
- Founded: 1950
- Ground: SK Motor Sich
- Capacity: 4,000
- Owner: Motor Sich
- Chairman: (Ukraine) Viktor Lunin
- Head coach: (Ukraine) Anatoliy Chantsev
- League: Ukrainian Amateur Football Championship
- 2022–23: 7th, Group 2

FC Motor Zaporizhzhia (Ukrainian: Футбольний Клуб Мотор (Запоріжжя)) is an amateur Ukrainian football team from Zaporizhzhia. The club is owned by an aircraft engine manufacturer Motor Sich.

== History ==
The club was created in 1950. For many years it participated in Zaporizhzhia Oblast Championship and Cup competition. Also team took part in Zaporizhzhia City Championship. In 2018 team began participating in Ukrainian Amateur Football Championship. With the Russian invasion of Ukraine club owner Motor Sich decided to focus on the war effort and ceased funding of the club beginning January 2023.

== Honours ==
- Zaporizhzhia Oblast Championship
  - Winners (11): 1951, 1963, 1964, 1965, 1966, 2010, 2012, 2018, 2019, 2020, 2021
- Zaporizhzhia Oblast Cup
  - Winners (4): 1963, 1697, 1974, 1975

== See also ==
- HC Motor Zaporizhzhia, a handball club that was adopted by Motor Sich in 2009
