= Zirka Stadium =

Stadium in Kropyvnytskyi, Ukraine

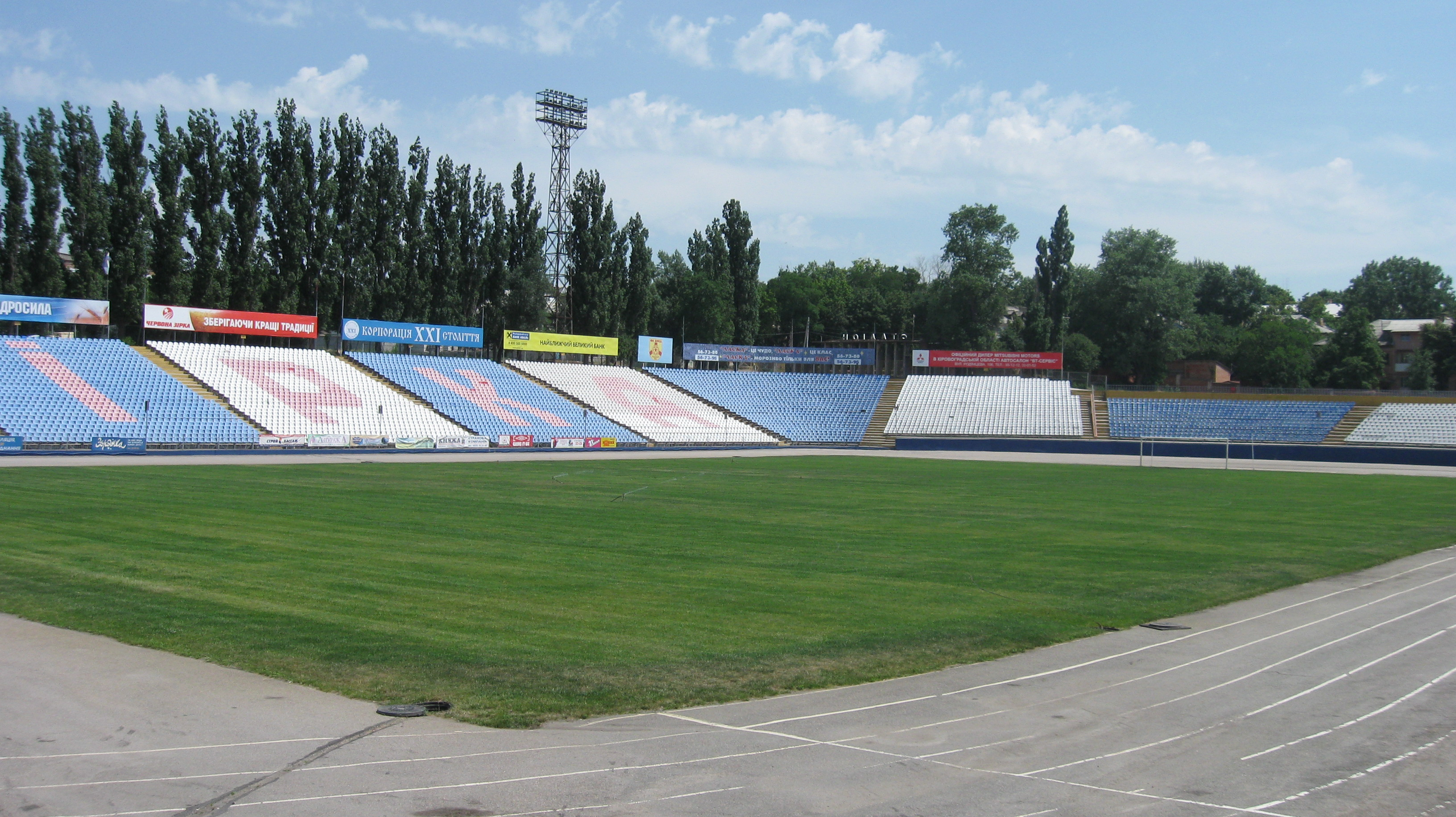
- Interactive map of Zirka Stadium
- Location: Kropyvnytskyi, Ukraine
- Coordinates: 48°30′57″N 32°16′0″E
- Capacity: 14,628 (since 2014)
- Surface: Grass

Tenant
- FC Zirka Kropyvnytskyi

Zirka Stadium is a multifunctional facility, primarily used for football located in Kropyvnytskyi, Ukraine. The stadium is the biggest one in Kirovohrad Oblast.

Currently the professional football club FC Zirka Kropyvnytskyi plays their home games at the stadium. The stadium has a capacity of 14,628.

== Football usage ==
Some other clubs of Kropyvnytskyi (Kirovohrad) also used this facility among which are Olimpik Kirovohrad, Nova Politsiya Kropyvnytskyi and others.
