= Mykolaivka, Sumy Raion, Sumy Oblast =

Rural locality in Sumy Oblast, Ukraine

Mykolaivka Миколаївка
- Rural settlement
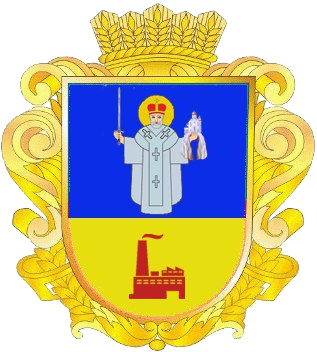
- Coat of arms

- Location within Sumy Oblast Location within Ukraine
- Coordinates: 50°56′29″N 34°22′43″E
- Country: Ukraine
- Oblast: Sumy Oblast
- Raion: Sumy Raion
- Hromada: Mykolaivka settlement hromada
- Established: 1650s

Area
  - Total: 6.4 km^{2} (2.5 sq mi)

Population (2022)
  - Total: 4,147 ▼
  - Density: 650/km^{2} (1,700/sq mi)
- Time zone: UTC+02:00 (EET)
  - Summer (DST): UTC+03:00 (EEST)
- Postal index: 41854
- Area code: +380 5443

Mykolaivka (Ukrainian: Миколаївка), previously Mykolaivka-Vyrivska (until 1957) and later Zhovtneve (1957–2016) is a rural settlement in Sumy Raion, Sumy Oblast, northeastern Ukraine. Population: 4,147 (2022 estimate).

== History ==
During World War II it was under German occupation.

Urban-type settlement since 1957.

In January 1989 the population was 4768 people.

In January 2013 the population was 4350 people.

The settlement was called Zhovtneve, to commemorate the October Revolution, until 2016. On 19 May 2016, Verkhovna Rada adopted decision to rename Chervone to Esman according to the law prohibiting names of Communist origin.

Until 26 January 2024, Mykolaivka was designated urban-type settlement. On this day, a new law entered into force which abolished this status, and Mykolaivka became a rural settlement.
