= FC Bastion Illichivsk =

FSC Bastion Illichivsk
- Full name: Football Club Bastion Illichivsk
- Founded: 2005
- Dissolved: 2014
- Ground: Shkilnyi Stadium, Chornomorsk
- Manager: Oleksandr Krasnyanskyi
- 2010–11: 4th

FSC Bastion Illichivsk was a Ukrainian football team from Chornomorsk (formerly Illichivsk) in Odesa oblast. They entered the professional leagues for the first time in 2008. After the 2010–11 season, the club withdrew from the Professional Football League of Ukraine and lost its professional status. In 2012, they had their status revived, but they withdrew right at the start of the season (a day before).

== History ==
The Football Sports Club Bastion was created in October 2005 from an existing group of companies, "Bastion", which had operated in Illichivsk since 1998. FSC Bastion began by establishing its football academy and its own football infrastructure. Bastion formed their adult squad only in November of 2006.

Their first tournament was the 2006–07 Odesa City Winter Challenge, where they placed fourth, losing the bronze medal match to Real-Pharm. In 2007, Bastion became the champions of the Odesa city championship. The same year Bastion took part in the 2007 AAFU league championship, which they won. Parallel to the league championship, Bastion participated in the 2007 AAFU Cup, but were less fortunate, being eliminated at the very first round by Khodak Cherkasy.

In September 2008, Bastion played in the 2009 UEFA Regions' Cup intermediate round, but were unable to qualify for the finals, placing second after the group host Romania's Oltenia.

At the same time, Bastion entered the professional leagues for the first time in 2008.

After three seasons, Bastion withdrew from professional competitions due to lack of financing and switched to concentrating on their football academy. However, few months later, the Professional Football League announced that Bastion was among clubs that applied for professional status for the next season (2012–13). Bastion had their professional status renewed for the 2012–13, but withdrew right before the start. They forfeited their 2012–13 Ukrainian Cup game against Hvardiyets Hvardiyske.

In 2013, Bastion revived their adult squad for a season.

== League and cup history ==
Season	Div.	Pos.	Pl.	W	D	L	GS	GA	P	Domestic Cup	Europe		Notes
2007	4th	1	8	6	1	1	17	9	19				
2007	4th	1	2	2	0	0	9	4	6				
2007	4th	1	2	2	0	0	4	0	6				Champion
2008	4th	3	8	4	1	3	23	13	13				
2008–09	3rd "A"	6	32	16	4	12	36	40	52	1/32 finals	RC	Group stage	
2009–10	3rd "A"	3	20	11	7	2	44	20	40	1/32 finals			
2010–11	3rd "A"	4	22	13	4	5	38	16	43	1/32 finals			Withdrew
2011–12	Idle												
2012–13	withdrew												
2013	4th	1	10	7	0	3	15	14	21				
2013	4th	3	3	1	0	2	2	8	3				

=== Bastion-2 Illichivsk ===
Season	Div.	Pos.	Pl.	W	D	L	GS	GA	P	Domestic Cup	Europe	Notes
2009	4th	3	6	3	0	3	10	10	9			
2009	4th	4	3	0	0	3	1	5	0			

== Coaches ==
- Oleksandr Krasnyanskyi
