= Ukrainian Association of Amateur Football =

Sports organization

- Founded: 2 March 1998; 28 years ago
- Country: Ukraine
- Confederation: UEFA
- Divisions: Ukrainian football championship among amateurs
- Number of clubs: 19
- Level on pyramid: 4
- Promotion to: Professional Football League of Ukraine (PFL)
- Relegation to: none
- League cup: Ukrainian Amateur Cup
- Current champions: Dnister Zalishchyky
- Website: www.aafu.org.ua

Association of Amateur Football of Ukraine
- Асоціація аматорського футболу України
- Abbreviation: AAFU
- Predecessor: UAF (FFU) committee of amateur football
- Formation: 2 March 1998; 28 years ago
- Founder: Ukrainian Association of Football (Football Federation of Ukraine)
- Founded at: Kyiv, Ukraine
- Type: sports organization (association football)
- Legal status: national
- Purpose: Organization of amateur football competitions
- Headquarters: FFU House of Football
- Location: Laboratornyi provulok 7a, Kyiv, Ukraine
- Region served: Ukraine
- Services: Ukrainian football championship among amateurs; Ukrainian Amateur Cup; Ukrainian Amateur Super Cup; "Leather Ball" competitions
- Official language: Ukrainian
- Owner: public
- Head of AAFU: Oleksandr Kadenko
- Deputy head: Myron Chernetskyi
- Deputy head: Andriy Biba
- Deputy head: Taras Klym
- Board of directors: Executive Committee
- Main organ: Conference (once in four years)
- Affiliations: Ukrainian Association of Football
- Website: www.aafu.org.ua

The Association of Amateur Football of Ukraine (Ukrainian: Асоціація аматорського футболу України, AAFU) is a sports organization that administers national competitions of association football among amateur and children teams. AAFU is a collective member of the Football Federation of Ukraine.

== Historic outlook ==
It was established on 2 March 1998 and, under the association agreement between the Football Federation of Ukraine and the Association, it is authorized to organize the All-Ukrainian National Football Championship and Cup tournaments amongst amateur football teams. The football championship is considered the fourth level of national competition and is the premier competition for amateur clubs (professionally non-licensed). The current head (formerly presidential post) of the AAFU is Oleksandr Kadenko.

In April of 2026, it was announced that starting from the 2027–28 season, the AAFU competitions would be reorganized, and along with the Professional Football League of Ukraine, the Second League would form the third tier of football competitions.

== Amateur Championship ==
The competitions have taken place since 1964 as part of the broader Soviet "KFK competitions", which were republican level championships for all union republics of the Soviet Union. After the dissolution of the Soviet Union, for a short period, competitions continued under a familiar format. Eventually, it was decided to form a separate administrative entity. Previously, the competitions were administered directly by one of the Football Federation of Ukraine committees. Since 1998, the championship has been organized by the Ukrainian Amateur Football Association.

== The AAFU teams at the UEFA Regions' Cup ==
In 1999–2015, AAFU used to provide a team for UEFA Regions' Cup. It was usually a champion of the championship, but there were some exclusions to the rule. The teams did not represent any region in Ukraine, but rather represented Ukrainian amateur football in general.

Teams that represented Ukraine at the Regions Cup:

- 1999 – National amateur team (UFEI Kyiv)
- 2001 – Dnister Ovidiopol
- 2003 – Pivdenstal Yenakiive
- 2005 – KZEZO Kakhovka as Kakhovka-Kzeso (the Russian-like spelling)
- 2007 – Ivan Odesa
- 2009 – Bastion Illichivsk, was in fact Bastion-2 Illichivsk as the first team was playing at professional level
- 2011 – Yednist-2 Plysky, the first team FC Yednist Plysky at that time played at professional level
- 2013 – Nove Zhyttia - Putrivka, a united team of both finalists that represent two different regions
- 2015 – AF-Pyatykhatska Volodymyrivka

In 2016, Football Federation of Ukraine introduced a new separate tournament called FFU Regions' Cup among Ukrainian regions and not related to AAFU. First season, 2015–16 FFU Regions' Cup, was won by the team of Kirovohrad Oblast based on FC Inhulets-2 Petrove, but to the 2017 UEFA Regions' Cup was sent a team "Ingulee, Kirovograd Region" (in reality represented by FC Inhulets-3 Petrove).

== Amateur Cup ==
The Cup is organized between the Cup holders of the regional tournaments. Every play-off round consists of two legs including the final. The winner of the tournament is qualified for the Ukrainian Cup.

== Leather Ball Club ==
All-Ukrainian competitions in association football for the prize of the Leather Ball Club in three age groups (among under-11, under-12, and under-13) for young footballers.

The main competition is known as the Coca-Cola Cup. The organizational committee is headed by a former Soviet footballer from Ukraine Andriy Biba.

The winners of competitions qualify for the Danone Nations Cup.

== National amateur football team ==
In 1999, Ukraine was represented at the UEFA Regions' Cup by its national team. It was led by coaches Yuriy Koval (first stage) and Pavlo Yakovenko (final stage).

== Heads / Presidents ==
- 1998 — 2020 Fedir Shpyh
- 2020 Oleksandr Kadenko
- 2020 — 2026 Serhiy Zahoruiko (executive director, acting)
- 2026 — present Oleksandr Kadenko

== See also ==
- Regional football federations of Ukraine
- FFU Regions' Cup
