= FC Lokomotyv Kupiansk =

FC Lokomotyv Kupiansk was an amateur club from Kupiansk competing at the regional competitions of Kharkiv Oblast.

The club was one of the oldest in the country being founded in 1923. With the fall of the Soviet Union, the club was dissolved.

In 1997 Lokomotyv Kupiansk was revived, but on 2 March 2016 it was announced that the club is closed.

== Honours ==
Ukrainian football championship among amateurs

- Runners-up (1): 2012

Football championship of Kharkiv Oblast

- Winners (13): 1947, 1952, 1966, 2001, 2003, 2005–2012
- Runners-up (7): 1948, 1965, 1967, 1968, 1998, 2002, 2004

Kharkiv Oblast Football Cup

- Holders (7): 2003–2005, 2007–2009, 2011
- Finalists (1): 2014
