= FC Tavriya Novotroitske =

Ukrainian football club

FC Tavriya Novotroitske is a Ukrainian football club from Novotroitske, Kherson Oblast.

The clubs exists since 1936. Beside football competitions in Kherson Oblast, the club also participates in friendly competition organized by SC Tavriya Simferopol, the Open Cup of AR Crimea Football Federation. Prior to the start of the 2020–21 Ukrainian Second League the club merged with SC Tavriya Simferopol, this fusion continued to play under the original name of SC Tavriya Simferopol (in the 2020–21 Ukrainian Second League season).

== Honours ==
- Football championship of Kherson Oblast
  - Winners (7): 1990, 1992, 1993, 1994, 1996, 2011, 2013
- Football cup of Kherson Oblast
  - Winners (9): 1951, 1962, 1992, 1994, 1997, 1998, 2001, 2010, 2013

== League and cup history ==
Season	Div.	Pos.	Pl.	W	D	L	GS	GA	P	Domestic Cup	Europe	Notes

== Coaches ==
- Igor Gamula (2000)
