= 2013–14 Ukrainian First League =

Ukrainian First League
- Season: 2013–14
- Champions: Olimpik Donetsk
- Promoted: Olimpik Donetsk; ~~Oleksandriya~~
- Relegated: Avanhard (suspended); ~~Tytan~~ (withdrew); ~~UkrAhroKom~~ (withdrew)
- Matches: 221
- Goals: 542 (2.45 per match)
- Top goalscorer: 13 – Oleksandr Akymenko (Stal)
- Biggest home win: 6 – Dynamo-2 6–0 Tytan (Round 23)
- Biggest away win: 4 – Sumy 0–4 Dynamo-2 (Round 28)
- Highest scoring: 7 – Oleksandriya 4–3 Naftovyk-Ukrnafta (Round 1); Tytan 4–3 Mykolaiv (Round 6)
- Longest winning run: 4 – Naftovyk-Ukrnafta (Round 12–15)
- Longest unbeaten run: 20 – Olimpik (Round 4–23)
- Longest winless run: 13 – Dynamo-2 (Round 1–8, 10–13, 15)
- Longest losing run: 5 – Desna (Round 6–10)
- Highest attendance: 8,300 – Mykolaiv–Avanhard (Round 5); Mykolaiv–Helios (Round 7)
- Lowest attendance: 0 – 5 matches (Round 27)

The 2013–14 Ukrainian First League was the 23rd since its establishment. The competition commenced on 14 July 2013. Due to sponsorship reasons the league was called Favbet League 1. The competition had a winter break that started on 30 November 2013 and resumed on 28 March 2014. The completion concluded on 31 May 2014.

== Promotion and relegation ==
=== Promoted teams ===
Group 1

- Desna Chernihiv – Second League champion (returning after an absence of 3 seasons)
- Nyva Ternopil – Promotion/relegation play-off winner (returning after an absence of 3 seasons)

Group 2

- UkrAhroKom Holovkivka – Second League (debut)

=== Relegated teams ===
No teams were relegated from the 2012–13 Ukrainian Premier League.

Originally Hoverla Uzhhorod and Metalurh Zaporizhzhia were to be relegated from the Ukrainian Premier League after finishing in 15th and 16th places. However, Kryvbas Kryvyi Rih failed attestation and their license was withdrawn by the Ukrainian Premier League. Number of clubs refused promotion leaving two vacant positions in the 2013–14 Ukrainian Premier League which were awarded to the relegating clubs.

=== Team reduction ===
The competition was reduced by two teams to sixteen at the PFL Conference on 26 June 2013. Krymteplytsia Molodizhne withdrew from the PFL after the previous season and Shakhtar Sverdlovsk bid for promotion was refused.

== Location map ==
The following displays the location of teams.

Location of teams in the 2013–14 Ukrainian First League

=== Stadiums ===
The following stadiums are considered home grounds for the teams in the competition.

Rank	Stadium	Capacity	Club	Notes
1	Yuvileiny Stadium, Sumy	25,800	FC Sumy	
2	Central City Stadium, Mykolaiv	16,700	MFC Mykolaiv	
3	Zirka Stadium, Kirovohrad	13,667	Zirka Kirovohrad	
4	City Stadium, Ternopil	12,750	Nyva Ternopil	
5	Yuri Gagarin Stadium, Chernihiv	12,060	Desna Chernihiv	
6	Bukovyna Stadium, Chernivtsi	12,000	Bukovyna Chernivtsi	
7	Stal Stadium, Alchevsk	9,200	Stal Alchevsk	
8	CSC Nika Stadium, Oleksandria	7,000	PFC Oleksandriya	
8	CSC Nika Stadium, Oleksandria	7,000	UkrAhroKom Holovkivka (Note: UkrAhroKom Holovkivka to play their home games at CSC Nika Stadium due to limited capacity and lighting at their traditional home ground, Holovkivskiy Stadium, Holovkivka. (28 June 2013))	
8	CSC Nika Stadium, Oleksandria	7,000	Zirka Kirovohrad	Used as home ground in Round 29
9	Naftovyk Stadium, Okhtyrka	5,256	Naftovyk-Ukrnafta Okhtyrka	
10	Sonyachny Stadium, Kharkiv	4,924	Helios Kharkiv	
11	Prapor Stadium, Kramatorsk	4,000	Avanhard Kramatorsk	
12	Khimik Stadium, Armyansk	3,450	Tytan Armyansk	
13	Sports Complex Olimpik, Donetsk	3,000	Olimpik Donetsk	
14	Lokomotiv Stadium, Poltava	2,500	FC Poltava	
14	Lokomotiv Stadium, Poltava	2,500	Avanhard Kramatorsk	Used as home ground in Round 27
15	Helios Arena, Kharkiv	2,057	Helios Kharkiv	
16	Stadium Educational Training Base Center FC Poltava, Kopyly Poltava Oblast	1,500	FC Poltava	Used as home ground Round 24 & 26
17	Mashynobudivnyk Stadium, Karlivka	1,300	FC Poltava	Used as home ground in Round 14
17	Mashynobudivnyk Stadium, Karlivka	1,300	Helios Kharkiv	Used as home ground in Round 27
17	Mashynobudivnyk Stadium, Karlivka	1,300	Stal Alchevsk	Used as home ground in Round 28
18	Dynamo Training Center, Kyiv	1,200	Dynamo-2 Kyiv	
19	Enerhiya Stadium, Berdyansk	700	Olimpik Donetsk	Used as home ground Round 30
20	Holovkivskyy Stadium, Holovkivka	580	UkrAhroKom Holovkivka	
20	Holovkivskyy Stadium, Holovkivka	580	Zirka Kirovohrad (Note: Zirka Kirovohrad to play their spring session home games at Holovkivskyy Stadium, Holovkivka due to reconstruction of their home ground, Zirka Stadium. (29 December 2013))	Used as home ground in spring session

== Managers ==
Club	Coach	Replaced coach
Avanhard Kramatorsk	(Ukraine) Yakiv Kripak	(Ukraine) Serhiy Shevchenko
Bukovyna Chernivtsi	(Ukraine) Yuriy Hiy	(Ukraine) Vadym Zayats
Desna Chernihiv	(Ukraine) Oleksandr Ryabokon	
Dynamo-2 Kyiv	(Belarus) Alyaksandr Khatskevich	
Helios Kharkiv	(Ukraine) Serhiy Yesin	
PFC Oleksandriya	(Ukraine) Volodymyr Sharan	
MFC Mykolaiv	(Ukraine) Vyacheslav Mazarati	(Ukraine) Volodymyr Ponomarenko (Ukraine) Oleh Fedorchuk
Naftovyk-Ukrnafta Okhtyrka	(Ukraine) Vadym Kolesnyk	(Ukraine) Yevhen Yarovenko
Nyva Ternopil	(Ukraine) Bohdan Samardak	(Ukraine) Ihor Yavorskyi
Olimpik Donetsk	(Ukraine) Roman Sanzhar	
FC Poltava	(Ukraine) Ilya Blyznyuk	
Stal Alchevsk	(Ukraine) Vadym Plotnikov	
FC Sumy	(Ukraine) Serhiy Strashnenko	(Ukraine) Andriy Kononenko
Tytan Armyansk	(Ukraine) Serhiy Kozlov	(Ukraine) Oleh Lutkov
UkrAhroKom Holovkivka	(Ukraine) Yuriy Hura	
Zirka Kirovohrad	(Ukraine) Anatoliy Buznyk	(Ukraine) Mykola Fedorenko

=== Managerial changes ===
Team	Outgoing head coach	Manner of departure	Date of vacancy	Table	Incoming head coach	Date of appointment
PFC Oleksandriya	(Ukraine) Vitaliy Pervak	End caretaker	7 June	Pre season	(Ukraine) Volodymyr Sharan	8 June
Stal Alchevsk	(Ukraine) Anatoliy Volobuyev	Sporting Director in Club	13 June	Pre season	(Ukraine) Vadym Plotnikov	21 June
Tytan Armyansk	(Ukraine) Oleh Leshchynskyi	Resigned	21 June	Pre season	(Ukraine) Oleh Lutkov	21 June
FC Poltava	(Ukraine) Anatoliy Bezsmertnyi	Moves to Club Administration	21 June	Pre season	(Ukraine) Ilya Blyznyuk	21 June
Zirka Kirovohrad	(Ukraine) Samir Hasanov	End caretaker	21 June	Pre season	(Ukraine) Mykola Fedorenko	21 June
Dynamo-2 Kyiv	(Ukraine) Andriy Husin	Replaced	2 July	Pre season	(Belarus) Alyaksandr Khatskevich	2 July
Bukovyna Chernivtsi	(Ukraine) Vadym Zayats	Resigned	31 August	9th	(Ukraine) Yuriy Hiy	5 September
MFC Mykolaiv	(Ukraine) Oleh Fedorchuk	Resigned	4 November	15th	(Ukraine) Volodymyr Ponomarenko (interim)	4 November
Naftovyk-Ukrnafta Okhtyrka	(Ukraine) Yevhen Yarovenko	Resigned	27 November	4th	(Ukraine) Vadym Kolesnyk	9 December
Avanhard Kramatorsk	(Ukraine) Serhiy Shevchenko	Resigned	27 November	11th	(Ukraine) Yakiv Kripak	3 December
MFC Mykolaiv	(Ukraine) Volodymyr Ponomarenko (interim)	End as interim	11 March	15th	(Ukraine) Vyacheslav Mazarati	11 March
Nyva Ternopil	(Ukraine) Ihor Yavorskyi	Resigned	17 March	5th	(Ukraine) Bohdan Samardak	26 March
Zirka Kirovohrad	(Ukraine) Mykola Fedorenko	Resigned	7 April	11th	(Ukraine) Anatoliy Buznyk	9 April
Tytan Armyansk	(Ukraine) Oleh Lutkov	Resigned	13 April	15th	(Ukraine) Serhiy Kozlov (interim)	13 April
FC Sumy	(Ukraine) Andriy Kononenko	Sacked	13 May	10th	(Ukraine) Serhiy Strashnenko (interim)	13 May

== League table ==
As of 31 May 2014

Pos	Team	Pld	W	D	L	GF	GA	GD	Pts	Promotion or relegation
1	Olimpik Donetsk (C, P)	30	16	7	7	45	33	+12	55	Promoted to Ukrainian Premier League
2	PFC Oleksandriya	30	14	10	6	47	28	+19	52	Refused promotion (Note: PFC Oleksandriya were to be promoted after finishing second but the president of the club refused promotion citing instability in the country and business reasons with the cost of keeping a team in the Premier League.)
3	Stal Alchevsk	30	16	3	11	41	33	+8	51	
4	FC Poltava	30	14	4	12	36	34	+2	46	
5	Desna Chernihiv	30	14	2	14	33	27	+6	44	
6	Zirka Kirovohrad	30	12	8	10	36	34	+2	44	
7	Naftovyk-Ukrnafta Okhtyrka	30	12	7	11	40	35	+5	43	
8	UkrAhroKom Holovkivka (D)	30	11	9	10	27	27	0	42	Merged after season
9	Helios Kharkiv	30	10	11	9	29	35	−6	41	
10	Nyva Ternopil	30	10	9	11	33	32	+1	39	
11	FC Sumy	30	11	6	13	29	39	−10	39	
12	Tytan Armyansk (D)	30	10	8	12	32	41	−9	38	Withdrew after season (Note: FC Tytan Armyansk completed the season but the team was dissolved due to the annexation of Crimea by the Russian Federation.)
13	Bukovyna Chernivtsi	30	10	6	14	26	36	−10	36	
14	Dynamo-2 Kyiv	30	8	8	14	29	30	−1	32	
15	Avanhard Kramatorsk (D)	30	7	10	13	23	27	−4	31	Suspended after season (Note: FC Avanhard Kramatorsk completed the season but the team's participation in competitions was suspended due to the war in Donbas.)
16	MFC Mykolaiv	30	9	4	17	34	49	−15	31	Avoided relegation (Note: Relegation to the Ukrainian Second League for the next season was canceled. The Central Council of Professional Football League of Ukraine considered the force majeure circumstances that were created due to war conditions in Kramatorsk as the reason for the cancellation. With the goal to preserve the maximum integrity of the League, considering that a direct threat to the life of footballers, coaching staff, and club's administration, those games, that were to be conducted with participation of Avanhard Kramatorsk to the end of the season, were recognized that they were not going to take place because of those unforeseen events. (21 May 2014))

Source: Professional Football League of Ukraine
Rules for classification: 1st points; 2nd goal difference; 3rd goals scored; 4th head-to-head points;
5th head-to-head goal difference; 6th head-to-head goals scored; 7th head-to-head fair play (all games); 8th draw or playoff
(C) Champions; (D) Disqualified; (P) Promoted

=== Results ===
As of 31 May 2014

Home \ Away	AVK	BUK	DES	DK2	HEL	MYK	NAF	NVT	OLK	OLD	POL	STA	SUM	TYA	UAP	ZIR
Avanhard Kramatorsk (Note: Initially the PFL ruled that matches involving Avanhard Kramatorsk were abandoned as a technical loss for both teams due to war conditions. Next day it was changed to a technical loss to Avanhard Kramatorsk in all games. (22 May 2014))		0–1	2–1	0–1	-:+ (Note: Round 25 match between Avanhard Kramatorsk and Helios Kharkiv is postponed due to unrest in the region. The game was to be played after Round 29 but was abandoned as a technical loss for Avanhard due to war conditions. (22 May 2014))	3–1	2–0	0–0	2–2	0–2	-:+ (Note: Round 27 match between Avanhard Kramatorsk and FC Poltava is rescheduled due to blocked access to the city of Kramatorsk following unrest in the region. The match was to be played at Karlivka but was abandoned as a technical loss for Avanhard due to war conditions. (22 May 2014))	0–2	-:+	1–0	0–1	2–1
Bukovyna Chernivtsi	0–0		1–0	0–1	1–1	2–0	0–1	0–0 (Note: Bukovyna Chernivtsi postpones their Round 9 match home match against Nyva Ternopil due to their financial situation. Match was played after Round 19.)	1–3	1–1	2–0	2–0	2–1	2–0	2–0	0–1
Desna Chernihiv	1–0	2–0		0–0	1–0	1–0	0–1	1–0	2–0	1–2	1–2	0–2	4–0	3–1	3–0	2–4
Dynamo-2 Kyiv	1–1	1–2	0–1		3–0 (Note: Dynamo-2 Kyiv postpones their Round 9 match at home against Helios Kharkiv since five players were called for international duty. The match was rescheduled after Round 15.)	1–2	1–0	0–1	0–0	2–1	1–2	1–1	0–2	6–0	1–1	1–0
Helios Kharkiv	1–0	0–0	1–0	3–1		2–1	3–2	3–0 (Note: Round 27 match between Helios Kharkiv and Nyva Ternopil is moved due to decisions made by the FFU of not conducting matches in Donetsk, Kharkiv, Luhansk and Odesa oblasts because of unrest in the region. The match was played at Karlivka. Match was not completed. Nyva Ternopil players walked off the pitch as a protest to a penalty awarded against them in 90+5' of the game. Score was 1–1 at the time. Control Disciplinary Committee of the Football Federation of Ukraine award a 3–0 technical victory to Helios .)	0–0	1–1	0–0	0–2	1–1	0–0	0–0	2–4
MFC Mykolaiv	0–0	1–2	0–1	3–0 (Note: PFL reschedules the Round 19 match between MFC Mykolaiv and Dynamo-2 Kyiv to after Round 20, since several Dynamo-2 Kyiv players were called for international duty.)	4–1		1–1	1–4	1–2	1–1	1–2	0–2 (Note: Round 27 match between MFC Mykolaiv and Stal Alchevsk rescheduled until after Round 29 due to unrest in the region.)	1–1	2–1	2–1	2–1
Naftovyk-Ukrnafta Okhtyrka	0–0	2–0	2–1	0–0	0–1	1–2		1–2	1–1	2–2	1–2	3–0	1–0	2–1	1–0	4–0
Nyva Ternopil	1–2	1–0	0–1	0–0	1–1	2–3	2–2		2–4	0–1	3–0 (Note: Administration of FC Poltava informed that the club would not travel to their Round 16 match against Nyva Ternopil as a protest against unobjective decisions by referees against the team. Control Disciplinary Committee of the Football Federation of Ukraine award a 3–0 technical victory to Nyva.)	2–0	2–0	2–2	2–0	2–2
PFC Oleksandriya	3–0	2–1	0–1	1–0	2–0	5–0	4–3	1–1		0–1	1–0	3–0	1–2	2–0	2–1	0–0
Olimpik Donetsk	1–3	3–2	1–0	3–1	1–3 (Note: Round 30 match between Olimpik Donetsk and Helios Kharkiv is moved due to decisions made by the FFU of not conducting matches in Donetsk, Kharkiv, Luhansk and Odesa oblasts because of unrest in the region. The match to be played at Enerhiya Stadium in Berdyansk, Zaporizhzhia Oblast.)	1–0	1–0	0–1	2–2		3–1	1–0	3–0	1–1	4–2	1–2
FC Poltava	1–1	2–0	3–1	2–1	0–1	2–0 (Note: FC Poltava play their Round 22 and 24 matches at their Educational Sport Training Base Stadium in Kopyly, Poltava Oblast due to construction of their Lokomotiv Stadium in Poltava.)	1–2	1–2	1–0	2–1		3–0	1–1	3–1	0–1	0–0
Stal Alchevsk	+:-	3–0 (Note: Administration of Bukovyna Chernivtsi informed that the club would not travel to their Round 8 match against Stal Alchevsk due to financial issues. Control Disciplinary Committee of the Football Federation of Ukraine award a 3–0 technical victory to Stal.)	3–2	1–0 (Note: Dynamo-2 Kyiv postpones their Round 14 away match against Stal Alchevsk since several players were called for international duty. Match was played after Round 25.)	3–1	1–0	2–2 (Note: Round 28 match between Stal Alchevsk and Naftovyk-Ukrnafta Okhtyrka is moved due to decisions made by the FFU of not conducting matches in Donetsk, Kharkiv, Luhansk and Odesa oblasts because of unrest in the region. The match to be played at Karlivka.)	1–0	1–3	1–1	2–1		5–0	2–0	2–2	1–2
PFC Sumy	1–1	3–1	1–0	0–4	2–0	0–1	0–2	3–0	2–0	0–1	3–1	1–3		2–2	0–1	2–0
Tytan Armyansk	4–2	1–0	0–1	1–0	2–2	4–3	0–2	1–0	0–0	3–0 (Note: Administration of Olimpik Donetsk informed their opponent Tytan Armyansk that the club would not travel to their Round 29 match due to instability in the region. Later the PFL administration awarded a technical win (3:0) to Tytan Armyansk and a technical loss (3:0) to Olimpik Donetsk.)	0–1	2–0	1–0		1–0	1–0
UkrAhroKom Holovkivka	0–0	0–0	1–0	1–1	3–1	2–0	3–0	0–0	2–2	0–1	2–1	2–1	0–0	0–0		1–0
Zirka Kirovohrad	1–1	5–1	0–0	1–0	0–0	2–1	2–1	1–0	1–1	1–3	2–0	1–0	0–1	2–2	0–2	

Source: Calendar (in Ukrainian)
Legend: Blue = home team win; Yellow = draw; Red = away team win.

=== Positions by round ===
The following table represents the teams position after each round in the competition.

Team ╲ Round	1	2	3	4	5	6	7	8	9	10	11	12	13	14	15	16	17	18	19	20	21	22	23	24	25	26	27	28	29	30
Olimpik Donetsk	1	6	10	7	6	4	3	4	3	1	3	2	1	1	1	1	1	1	1	1	1	1	1	1	1	1	1	1	1	1
PFC Oleksandriya	4	3	2	2	1	2	2	1	4	2	1	3	3	4	4	3	2	2	2	2	2	2	2	3	2	2	2	2	2	2
Stal Alchevsk	2	1	1	1	3	1	1	2	1	3	2	1	2	3	3	4	3	3	3	3	3	3	3	2	3	3	3	3	3	3
FC Poltava	13	9	11	8	12	7	10	9	6	7	7	7	6	6	7	9	11	10	11	12	8	7	8	7	5	4	5	4	4	4
Desna Chernihiv	7	13	7	11	7	11	13	14	14	15	14	11	11	9	12	10	8	6	5	5	7	9	7	10	6	5	4	6	5	5
Zirka Kirovohrad	6	11	5	9	9	6	7	8	10	11	8	8	8	8	6	6	6	8	8	10	10	11	9	9	11	7	6	5	6	6
Naftovyk-Ukrnafta Okhtyrka	11	5	6	10	10	12	8	10	7	6	6	5	5	2	2	2	4	4	4	4	4	4	5	5	9	10	8	9	7	7
UkrAhroKom Holovkivka	14	15	15	16	16	16	14	12	12	12	10	10	10	13	11	12	10	9	9	8	9	8	10	8	8	8	9	7	8	8
Helios Kharkiv	15	16	16	12	14	15	16	15	15	13	13	14	13	10	13	13	13	13	14	14	15	15	14	12	12	13	14	15	12	9
Nyva Ternopil	5	8	4	4	8	10	12	13	13	14	15	15	15	14	14	15	14	15	13	7	5	5	4	4	4	6	7	8	9	10
PFC Sumy	3	2	3	5	2	5	6	5	5	4	4	4	4	5	5	5	5	5	7	9	12	10	11	11	7	9	10	11	10	11
Bukovyna Chernivtsi	10	14	13	14	11	13	9	11	11	8	12	13	9	11	9	8	7	7	6	6	6	6	6	6	10	11	12	10	11	12
Tytan Armyansk	16	10	12	13	13	9	11	7	9	9	9	9	12	12	10	7	9	11	12	13	14	14	15	15	13	14	11	12	13	13
Dynamo-2 Kyiv	8	12	14	15	15	14	15	16	16	16	16	16	16	16	16	16	16	16	16	16	16	16	16	16	16	16	16	16	16	14
Avanhard Kramatorsk	9	4	9	6	5	3	4	3	2	5	5	6	7	7	8	11	12	12	10	11	11	12	13	14	15	15	15	13	14	15
MFC Mykolaiv	12	7	8	3	4	8	5	6	8	10	11	12	14	15	15	14	15	14	15	15	13	13	12	13	14	12	13	14	15	16

Updated to match(es) played on 27 May 2014. Source: pfl.ua

== Top goalscorers ==
As of 31 May 2014

#	Scorer	Goals (Pen.)	Team
1	(Ukraine) Oleksandr Akymenko	13 (2)	Stal Alchevsk
3	(Ukraine) Serhiy Starenkyi	11	PFC Oleksandriya
3	(Ukraine) Ruslan Kachur	11 (2)	Helios Kharkiv
4	(Ukraine) Mykhaylo Serhiychuk (Note: Ukrainian Premier League club Karpaty Lviv signed Mykhaylo Serhiychuk during the winter break.)	10 (2)	MFC Mykolaiv
4	(Moldova) Serhei Nudnii	10 (7)	Tytan Armyansk
6	(Nigeria) Sheriff Isa	8	Olimpik Donetsk
6	(Ukraine) Vladyslav Nasibulin	8	FC Poltava
6	(Ukraine) Vasyl Palahniuk	8	Bukovyna Chernivtsi
6	(Ukraine) Vitaliy Ponomar	8	UkrAhroKom Holovkivka
6	(Ukraine) Oleksandr Sytnik	8	Olimpik Donetsk
6	(Ukraine) Vasyl Hrytsuk	8 (2)	PFC Oleksandriya

== See also ==
- 2013–14 Ukrainian Premier League
- 2013–14 Ukrainian Second League
- 2013–14 Ukrainian Cup
