= 2012–13 Ukrainian First League =

Ukrainian First League
- Season: 2012–13
- Champions: FC Sevastopol
- Promoted: FC Sevastopol; ~~Stal Alchevsk~~; ~~PFC Oleksandria~~
- Relegated: Arsenal Bila Tserkva; ~~FC Odesa~~ (withdrew); ~~Krymteplitsia~~ (withdrew); ~~Obolon~~ (withdrew)
- Matches: 290
- Goals: 689 (2.38 per match)
- Top goalscorer: 18 goals – Serhiy Kuznetsov (FC Sevastopol)
- Biggest home win: Mykolaiv 8–0 Arsenal (Round 34)
- Biggest away win: Krymteplitsia 0–4 Sevastopol (Round 4); Olimpik 0–4 Odesa (Round 18); Arsenal 0–4 Avanhard (ppd. Round 22); Arsenal 1–5 Naftovyk-Ukrnafta (Round 32)
- Highest scoring: Zirka 6–2 Arsenal (Round 29); Mykolaiv 8–0 Arsenal (Round 34)
- Longest winning run: 7 – Sevastopol (Round 19–21, Round 23–26)
- Longest unbeaten run: 11 – Naftovyk-Ukrnafta (Round 12–22)
- Longest losing run: 10 – Odesa (Round 14–23)
- Highest attendance: 12,000 Mykolaiv–Dynamo-2 (Round 32)
- Lowest attendance: 0 (Note: See results) Sevastopol–Naftovyk-Ukrnafta (Round 1)

The 2012–13 Ukrainian First League was the 22nd since its establishment. The competition commenced on 13 July 2012 when Obolon Kyiv visited Sumy and played a goalless draw against FC Sumy. The competition had a winter break that started 25 November 2012 and resumed on 23 March 2013.

== Promotion and relegation ==
=== Promoted teams ===
Three teams were promoted from the 2011–12 Ukrainian Second League

Group A

- FC Sumy – champion (debut, however in the 2006–07 Ukrainian First League season Spartak represented the city of Sumy)

Group B

- FC Poltava – champion (debut)
- Avanhard Kramatorsk – promotion/relegation playoff finalist (debut)

=== Relegated teams ===
Two teams were relegated from the 2011–12 Ukrainian Premier League

- Obolon Kyiv – 15th place (returning after three seasons)
- PFC Oleksandria – 16th place (returning after one season)

=== Withdrawn teams ===
Prior to the season starting Nyva Vinnytsia withdrew from the PFL.

== Team locations ==
=== Map ===
The following displays the location of teams.

Location of teams in Ukrainian First League 2012–13
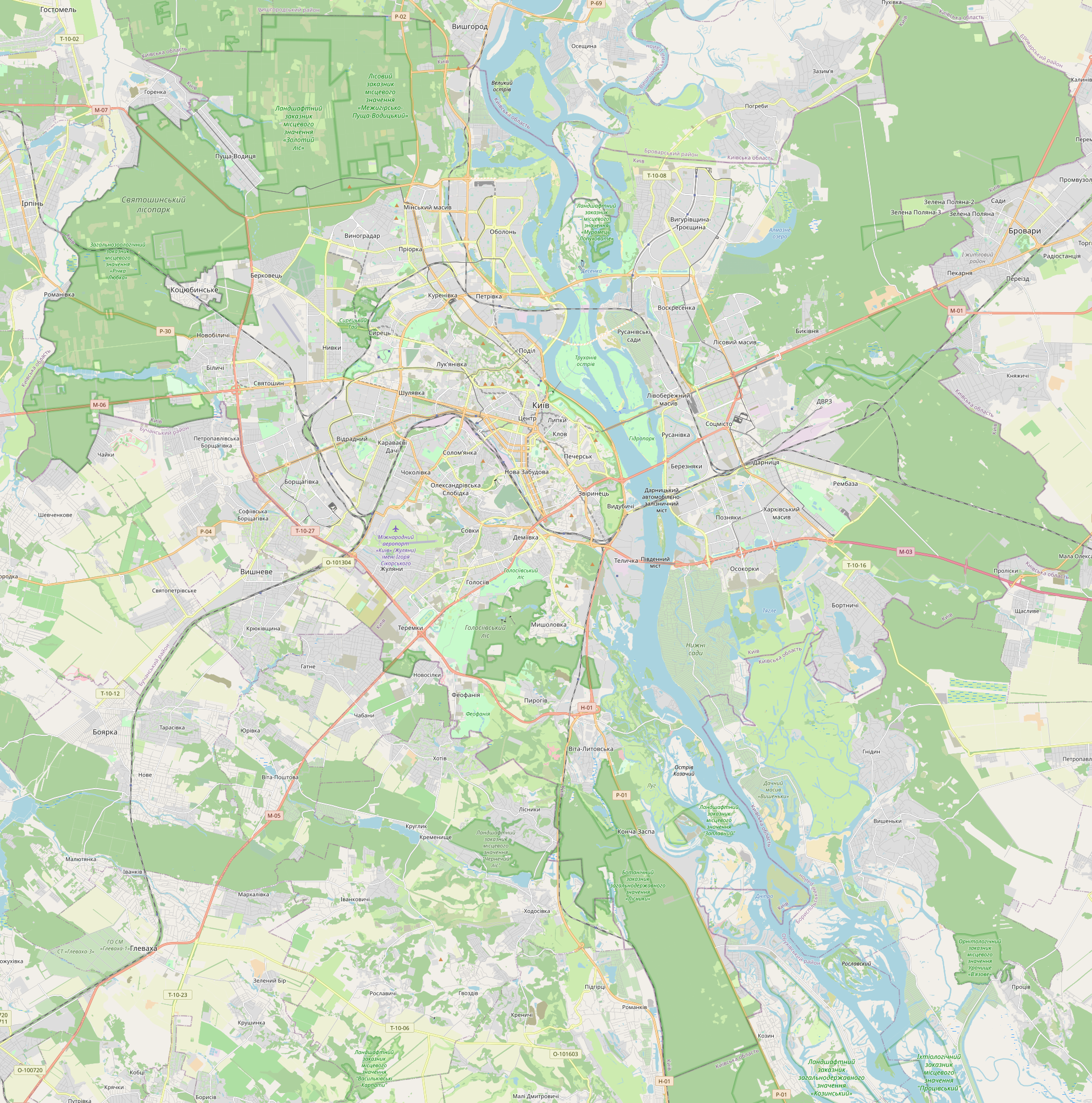
Kyiv city home venues of teams in the League

=== Stadiums ===
The following stadiums are considered home grounds for the teams in the competition.

Rank	Stadium	Capacity	Club	Notes
1	Yuvileiny Stadium, Sumy	25,800	FC Sumy	
2	Lobanovskyi Dynamo Stadium, Kyiv	16,873	Dynamo-2 Kyiv	
3	Central Stadium, Mykolaiv	16,700	MFK Mykolaiv	
4	Zirka Stadium, Kirovohrad	13,667	Zirka Kirovohrad	
5	Labor Reserve, Bila Tserkva	13,500	Arsenal Bila Tserkva	
6	Bukovyna Stadium, Chernivtsi	12,000	Bukovyna Chernivtsi	
7	Stal Stadium, Alchevsk	9,200	Stal Alchevsk	
8	CSC Nika Stadium, Oleksandria	7,000	PFC Oleksandria	
9	SK Sevastopol, Sevastopol, Crimea	5,563	FC Sevastopol	
10	Naftovyk Stadium, Okhtyrka	5,256	Naftovyk-Ukrnafta Okhtyrka	
11	Obolon Arena, Kyiv	5,100	Obolon Kyiv	
12	Sonyachny Stadium, Kharkiv	4,924	Helios Kharkiv	Used from Round 4 as home ground
13	Spartak Stadium, Odesa	4,610	FC Odesa	
14	Avanhard Stadium, Kramatorsk	4,000	Avanhard Kramatorsk	
15	Khimik Stadium, Armyansk, Crimea	3,450	Tytan Armyansk	
16	ST Sport Arena, Ahrarne, Crimea	3,250	Krymteplitsia Molodizhne	
17	Lokomotiv Stadium, Poltava	2,500	FC Poltava	
18	Helios Arena, Kharkiv	2,057	Helios Kharkiv	
19	Mashynobudivnyk Stadium, Karlivka	1,300	FC Poltava	Completion of Round 33 suspended match
20	Dynamo Club Stadium, Chapayevka	1,250	Dynamo-2 Kyiv	Used from Round 6 onwards as home ground
21	Training Base Knyazha, Schaslyve, Kyiv Oblast	1,000	Arsenal Bila Tserkva	Used in Round 24 & 26 as home ground
22	Sports Complex Olimpik, Donetsk	680	Olimpik Donetsk	

== Managers ==
Club	Coach	Replaced coach
Arsenal Bila Tserkva	(Ukraine) Yevhen Feschenko (caretaker)	(Ukraine) Oleh Lutkov (Ukraine) Oleh Sokyrko (caretaker) (Ukraine) Ihor Artymovych
Avanhard Kramatorsk	(Ukraine) Serhiy Shevchenko	
Bukovyna Chernivtsi	(Ukraine) Vadym Zayats	
Dynamo-2 Kyiv	(Ukraine) Andriy Husin	
Helios Kharkiv	(Ukraine) Serhiy Yesin (caretaker)	(Ukraine) Anatoliy Chantsev (Ukraine) Serhiy Yesin (caretaker) (Ukraine) Volodymyr Shekhovtsov (caretaker)
Krymteplytsia Molodizhne	(Ukraine) Serhiy Shevtsov	
PFC Oleksandria	(Ukraine) Vitaliy Pervak (caretaker)	(Ukraine) Andriy Kuptsov (caretaker)
MFC Mykolaiv	(Ukraine) Ruslan Zabranskyi	
Naftovyk-Ukrnafta Okhtyrka	(Ukraine) Yevhen Yarovenko	
Obolon Kyiv	(Ukraine) Serhiy Konyushenko	
FC Odesa	(Ukraine) Andriy Parkhomenko	
Olimpik Donetsk	(Ukraine) Roman Sanzhar (caretaker)	(Ukraine) Roman Pylypchuk (Ukraine) Ihor Petrov
FC Poltava	(Ukraine) Anatoliy Bezsmertnyi	
FC Sevastopol	(Belarus) Aleh Konanaw	
Stal Alchevsk	(Ukraine) Anatoliy Volobuyev	
FC Sumy	(Ukraine) Andriy Kononenko (caretaker)	(Ukraine) Serhiy Strashnenko (caretaker) (Ukraine) Ihor Zakharyak
Tytan Armyansk	(Ukraine) Oleh Leshchynskyi	(Ukraine) Oleksandr Haydash
Zirka Kirovohrad	(Ukraine) Samir Hasanov	(Ukraine) Ilya Blyznyuk

=== Managerial changes ===
Team	Outgoing head coach	Manner of departure	Date of vacancy	Table	Incoming head coach	Date of appointment
Zirka Kirovohrad	(Ukraine) Vadym Yevtushenko	Leaves for Vorskla Poltava	6 June	Pre-season	(Ukraine) Ilya Blyznyuk	7 June
PFC Sevastopol	(Ukraine) Serhiy Puchkov	Replaced	12 June	Pre-season	(Belarus) Aleh Konanaw	12 June
Krymteplytsia Molodizhne	(Ukraine) Mykola Fedorko (caretaker)	Replaced	15 June	Pre-season	(Ukraine) Serhiy Shevtsov	15 June
Tytan Armyansk	(Ukraine) Oleksandr Haydash	Resigned	7 September	18th	(Ukraine) Oleh Leshchynskyi	7 September
Olimpik Donetsk	(Ukraine) Ihor Petrov	Resigned	7 September	8th	(Ukraine) Roman Pylypchuk	7 September
Arsenal Bila Tserkva	(Ukraine) Ihor Artymovych	Resigned	29 September	16th	(Ukraine) Oleh Sokyrko (caretaker)	29 September
Helios Kharkiv	(Ukraine) Volodymyr Shekhovtsov (interim)	Resigned	10 November	11th	(Ukraine) Serhiy Yesin (interim)	10 November
Krymteplytsia Molodizhne	(Ukraine) Serhiy Shevtsov	Replaced	3 December	14th	(Ukraine) Mykhailo Sachko	5 January
Helios Kharkiv	(Ukraine) Serhiy Yesin (interim)	End of interim	9 January	9th	(Ukraine) Anatoliy Chantsev	9 January
Arsenal Bila Tserkva	(Ukraine) Oleh Sokyrko (caretaker)	End of interim	15 January	16th	(Ukraine) Oleh Lutkov	16 January
Sumy	(Ukraine) Ihor Zakharyak	Sacked	11 April	14th	(Ukraine) Serhiy Strashnenko (caretaker)	11 April
Sumy	(Ukraine) Serhiy Strashnenko (caretaker)	End as interim	18 April	11th	(Ukraine) Andriy Kononenko (caretaker)	18 April
Olimpik Donetsk	(Ukraine) Serhiy Pylypchuk	Sacked	17 April	12th	(Ukraine) Roman Sanzhar (caretaker)	17 April
Arsenal Bila Tserkva	(Ukraine) Oleh Lutkov	Sacked	21 April	17th	(Ukraine) Yevhen Feschenko (caretaker)	26 April
Helios Kharkiv	(Ukraine) Anatoliy Chantsev	Resigned	27 April	12th	(Ukraine) Serhiy Yesin (caretaker)	29 April
Oleksandria	(Ukraine) Andriy Kuptsov (caretaker)	Resigned	13 May	4th	(Ukraine) Vitaliy Pervak (caretaker)	13 May
Zirka Kirovohrad	(Ukraine) Ilya Blyznyuk	Sacked	4 June	5th	(Ukraine) Samir Hasanov	4 June

== Final standings ==
Pos	Team	Pld	W	D	L	GF	GA	GD	Pts	Promotion or relegation
1	Sevastopol (C, P)	34	22	8	4	71	22	+49	74	Promoted to Ukrainian Premier League
2	Stal Alchevsk	34	20	6	8	58	35	+23	66	Refused promotion (Note: Stal Alchevsk finished in second place were to be promoted to the Ukrainian Premier League but their club administration refused promotion indicating that they did not have adequate resources and infrastructure and would have to play to their games away from Alchevsk. PFC Oleksandria that placed third also refused promotion to the Ukrainian Premier League. The reason is that the club did not earn the promotion on the sports principle. Bukovyna Chernivtsi submitted all required documentation to the Football Federation of Ukraine and the Ukrainian Premier League on June 13, 2013. On June 14, 2013 the Attestation Committee of FFU refused to issue attestation for Bukovyna. The reason is that the club never applied for the Premier League attestation. On June 18, 2013 the Executive Committee of FFU allowed both Hoverla Uzhhorod and Metalurh Zaporizhzhia to stay in the Premier League.)
3	Oleksandriya	34	17	9	8	48	35	+13	60	Refused promotion
4	Bukovyna Chernivtsi	34	16	10	8	49	33	+16	58	Not allowed for promotion
5	Naftovyk-Ukrnafta Okhtyrka	34	15	9	10	39	31	+8	54	
6	Mykolaiv (Note: MFK Mykolaiv was given one month by the PFL to pay their league dues. The club failed to pay the dues in time and were deducted 3 points. (21 August 2012))	34	16	9	9	45	41	+4	54	
7	Avanhard Kramatorsk	34	15	8	11	37	26	+11	53	
8	Zirka Kirovohrad	34	14	10	10	46	37	+9	52	
9	Sumy	34	14	8	12	32	35	−3	50	
10	Helios Kharkiv	34	12	13	9	33	21	+12	49	
11	Olimpik Donetsk	34	15	4	15	34	37	−3	49	
12	Tytan Armyansk	34	13	9	12	44	40	+4	48	
13	Poltava	34	11	12	11	35	35	0	45	
14	Krymteplytsia Molodizhne (D)	34	9	8	17	30	45	−15	35	Withdrew from PFL (Note: Krymteplitsia Molodizhne completed the season but withdrew from the PFL. The team's administration informed the PFL that their club will exist only with a youth sports program. (11 June 2013))
15	Dynamo-2 Kyiv (O)	34	8	6	20	31	55	−24	30	Qualification for relegation play-off
16	Odesa (D)	34	7	3	24	21	63	−42	24	Relegation play-off – Withdrew from PFL
17	Obolon Kyiv (D)	34	5	7	22	19	28	−9	22	Withdrew from PFL (Note: Obolon Kyiv withdrew from the PFL during the attestion meeting held in the winter break. The team's administration informed the PFL that they lack sufficient funds to continue participating in the league. (21 February 2013))
18	Arsenal Bila Tserkva (R)	34	5	5	24	23	76	−53	20	Relegated to Ukrainian Second League

Source: Professional Football League of Ukraine
Rules for classification: 1st points; 2nd goal difference; 3rd goals scored; 4th head-to-head points; 5th head-to-head goal difference; 6th head-to-head goals scored; 7th fair play; 8th draw
(C) Champions; (D) Disqualified; (O) Play-off winners; (P) Promoted; (R) Relegated

=== Results ===
As of 8 June 2013

Home \ Away	ABT	AVK	BUK	DK2	HEL	KRM	MYK	NAF	OBO	ODS	OLK	OLD	POL	SEV	STA	SUM	TYA	ZIR
Arsenal Bila Tserkva		0–4 (Note: Match initially scheduled for Round 22 matches postponed due to the frigid weather. Match played after Round 30. (15 May 2013))	3–4 (Note: Round 24 and 26 fixture played at Training Base Knyazha in Schaslyve, Kyivska Oblast.)	1–0	0–3	1–3	1–3	1–5	+:-	1–3	1–4	2–0	1–4	2–1	0–3	1–2	1–1	1–2
Avanhard Kramatorsk	2–1		1–0	2–0	1–0	1–0	0–1 (Note: Matchеs initially scheduled for Round 22 was postponed due to the frigid weather. Two matches were played after Round 26. (23 April 2013))	0–0	+:-	4–0	0–0	1–0	0–1	0–1	0–2	1–1	1–0	0–2
Bukovyna Chernivtsi	2–0	1–1		0–2	1–1	2–1	4–0	2–1 (Note: Match initially scheduled for Round 23 matches postponed due to the inclement weather. Match played after Round 30. (16 May 2013))	3–0 (Note: The President of Obolon Kyiv indicated that the team is to withdraw from the PFL and that they would not be playing their Round 19 match against Bukovyna Chernivtsi since the sponsorship of the club was withdrawn. However, several days later the President of the PFL informed that the club will pay their players and will continue to play. Control-Disciplinary Committee of the FFU awards a 3–0 technical victory to Bukovyna Chernivtsi. (15 November 2012))	1–0	1–1	0–1	2–0	1–1	3–0	1–0	5–2	1–0
Dynamo-2 Kyiv	1–0	0–2	1–1 (Note: Match initially scheduled for Round 22 was postponed due to the frigid weather. Match played after Round 24. (9 April 2013))		0–2	2–1	1–2	0–2	+:-	3–0	1–2	1–2	1–3	2–4	0–0	1–3	1–3	1–2
Helios Kharkiv	0–0	2–2	0–2	2–0		2–0	2–2	0–1	2–1	3–0	2–0	1–2	0–0	1–0 (Note: Round 22 match postponed because players from FC Sevastopol were participating for the Ukraine national under-21 football team in UEFA U21 qualification matches. Match played after Round 30. (16 May 2013))	1–1	0–1	2–0	0–0
Krymteplytsia Molodizhne	1–0	0–1	0–0	3–1	1–0		2–0	1–2	+:-	1–1	0–0	0–1	1–1	0–4	1–3	2–0	0–3	0–2
MFC Mykolaiv	8–0	2–0	0–0	2–0	0–2	1–1		0–2	1–1	4–2	1–0	2–0 (Note: Match initially scheduled for Round 22 matches postponed due to the frigid weather. Match played after Round 30. (15 May 2013))	0–0	0–3 (Note: Players from MFC Mykolaiv boycotted the Round 20 match due to not being paid. Control-Disciplinary Committee of the FFU awards a 3–0 technical victory to FC Sevastopol. (22 November 2012))	3–2	1–0	0–2	2–2
Naftovyk-Ukrnafta Okhtyrka	0–0	0–3	2–1	0–1	0–2	1–0	3–1		0–0	1–0	2–3	3–0	2–2	2–1	1–2	1–0 (Note: Match initially scheduled for Round 22 was postponed due to the frigid weather. Match played after Round 23. (31 March 2013))	0–0	0–1
Obolon Kyiv	1–0	1–1	1–1	1–2 (Note: Round 9 match postponed because players from both teams were participating for the Ukraine national under-21 football team in UEFA U21 qualification matches. The fixture was played after Round 17 on 31 October.)	-:+	1–1	-:+	-:+		-:+	1–3	-:+	-:+	-:+	2–3	1–0	1–2	2–1
FC Odesa	1–0	1–1	0–0	1–0	3–2	0–2	1–2	0–1	1–3		0–1	0–4	1–0	0–1	1–2	1–3	1–0	0–3
PFC Oleksandriya	0–0	2–1	0–1	3–1	0–0	1–0	1–1	1–1	+:-	4–1		2–1	2–1	1–4	1–0	2–0	0–3	1–1
Olimpik Donetsk	4–1	0–2	2–0	1–0	0–0	0–3	2–0	0–0	1–1	1–0	1–4		3–0	1–3	0–1	1–0	0–2	4–0
FC Poltava	0–0	1–0 (Note: Round 33 match was suspended in the 14th minute with the score 0–0 due to torrential rain. Both clubs agreed to continue the match the next day starting at the 15th minute at Karlivka. (1 June 2013))	2–3	1–1	0–0	1–1	5–0	0–0	0–1	2–1	1–0	1–0		1–2	0–2	1–1	0–1	1–0
Sevastopol	3–0	1–0	3–0	0–0	0–0	5–2	0–0	2–2 (Note: Match was played in an empty stadium after the PFL imposed sanctions due to fan violence that occurred in the 2011–12 season in a match against Metalurh Zaporizhzhia.)	+:-	6–0	3–0	3–0	3–0		2–0	5–1	2–1	2–0
Stal Alchevsk	2–0	2–1	1–1	4–0	1–1	4–0	0–1	3–1	1–0	1–0	2–4	1–0	3–3	2–2		3–1	2–0	3–1
PFC Sumy	3–1 (Note: Match initially scheduled for Round 23 was postponed due to the frigid weather. Match played after Round 25. (17 April 2013))	2–0	2–1	1–1	0–0	1–0	0–2	0–1	0–0	1–0	2–1	0–0	1–0	1–0	2–0		0–0	1–0
Tytan Armyansk	0–1	1–3	1–3	2–4	1–0	2–1	2–2	3–2	3–0	1–0	0–0	2–0	1–2	1–1 (Note: Match initially scheduled for Round 29 was postponed due to FC Sevastopol's Ukrainian Cup semi final match on 8 May was played after Round 32. (29 May 2013))	1–2	2–2		0–0
Zirka Kirovohrad	6–2	1–1	3–1	2–2	1–0	1–1	0–1	1–0	+:-	4–1	1–4	1–2	1–1	1–1	1–0	4–0	1–1 (Note: Match initially scheduled for Round 22 was postponed due to the frigid weather. Match played after Round 25. (17 April 2013))	

Updated to match(es) played on 8 June 2013. Source: Calendar
Legend: Blue = home team win; Yellow = draw; Red = away team win.

=== Top goalscorers ===
The following were the top ten goalscorers.

#	Scorer	Goals (Pen.)	Team
1	(Ukraine) Serhiy Kuznetsov	18 (3)	FC Sevastopol
2	(Ukraine) Ruslan Platon	16 (4)	Bukovyna Chernivtsi
3	(Ukraine) Vyacheslav Shevchenko	15	PFC Oleksandria
4	(Ukraine) Vitaliy Prokopchenko	13 (5)	Tytan Armyansk
5	(Ukraine) Yaroslav Halenko	12	Zirka Kirovohrad
5	(Ukraine) Ruslan Ivashko	12 (2)	FC Poltava
7	(Ukraine) Ruslan Stepanyuk	11	Stal Alchevsk
8	(Ukraine) Dmytro Leonov	10 (1)	Arsenal Bila Tserkva/Stal Alchevsk (Note: Stal Alchevsk signed Dmytro Leonov during the winter break.)
8	(Ukraine) Roman Loktionov	10 (1)	Stal Alchevsk
10	(Ukraine) Oleksandr Akymenko	9	Stal Alchevsk
10	(Republic of the Congo) Burnel Okana-Stazi	9 (2)	Stal Alchevsk

=== Promotion/relegation play-off ===
A promotion/relegation home and away play-off were played by the 2nd team in Group 1 and 2 of 2012–13 Ukrainian Second League against the 15th and 16th placed teams of the 2012–13 Ukrainian First League competition. The draw for the play-off matches was held on 7 June.

Nyva Ternopil qualified from Ukrainian Second League.

Team 1	Agg.	Team 2	1st leg	2nd leg
FC Odesa	1–6	FC Nyva Ternopil	0–2	1–4
FC Shakhtar Sverdlovsk	1–2	FC Dynamo-2 Kyiv	1–1	0–1

=== Match #1 ===
==== First leg ====
12 June 2013
18:00 EEST

FC Odesa	0 – 2	Nyva Ternopil
	Report (uk)	H. Baranets 17'; Melnyk 60'

Spartak Stadium, Odesa
Referee: Serhiy Skyrda (Kharkiv)

==== Second leg ====
16 June 2013
19:30 EEST

Nyva Ternopil	4 – 1	FC Odesa
Kikot 22'; Yavorskyi 45+2'; Danyshchuk 62'; Tovkatskyi 86'	Report (uk)	Balabanov 64' (pen.)

City Stadium, Ternopil
Referee: Vitaliy Dyadenko (Kirovohrad)

6–1 on aggregate. FC Odesa after being relegated to Second League withdrew.

=== Match #2 ===
==== First leg ====
12 June 2013
17:00 EEST

Shakhtar Sverdlovsk	1 – 1	Dynamo-2 Kyiv
Korobkin 57' (pen.)	Report (uk)	Morozenko 77'

Avanhard Stadium, Rovenky
Referee: Roman Bozhyk (Sevastopol)

==== Second leg ====
16 June 2013
19:00 EEST

Dynamo-2 Kyiv	1 – 0	Shakhtar Sverdlovsk
Morozenko 44'	Report (uk)

Lobanovsky Dynamo Stadium, Kyiv
Referee: Andriy Lisakovskyi (Odesa)

2–1 on aggregate. Dynamo-2 Kyiv remain in First League.

== See also ==
- 2012–13 Ukrainian Premier League
- 2012–13 Ukrainian Second League
- 2012–13 Ukrainian Cup
