= Yuriy Hura =

Ukrainian footballer and coach

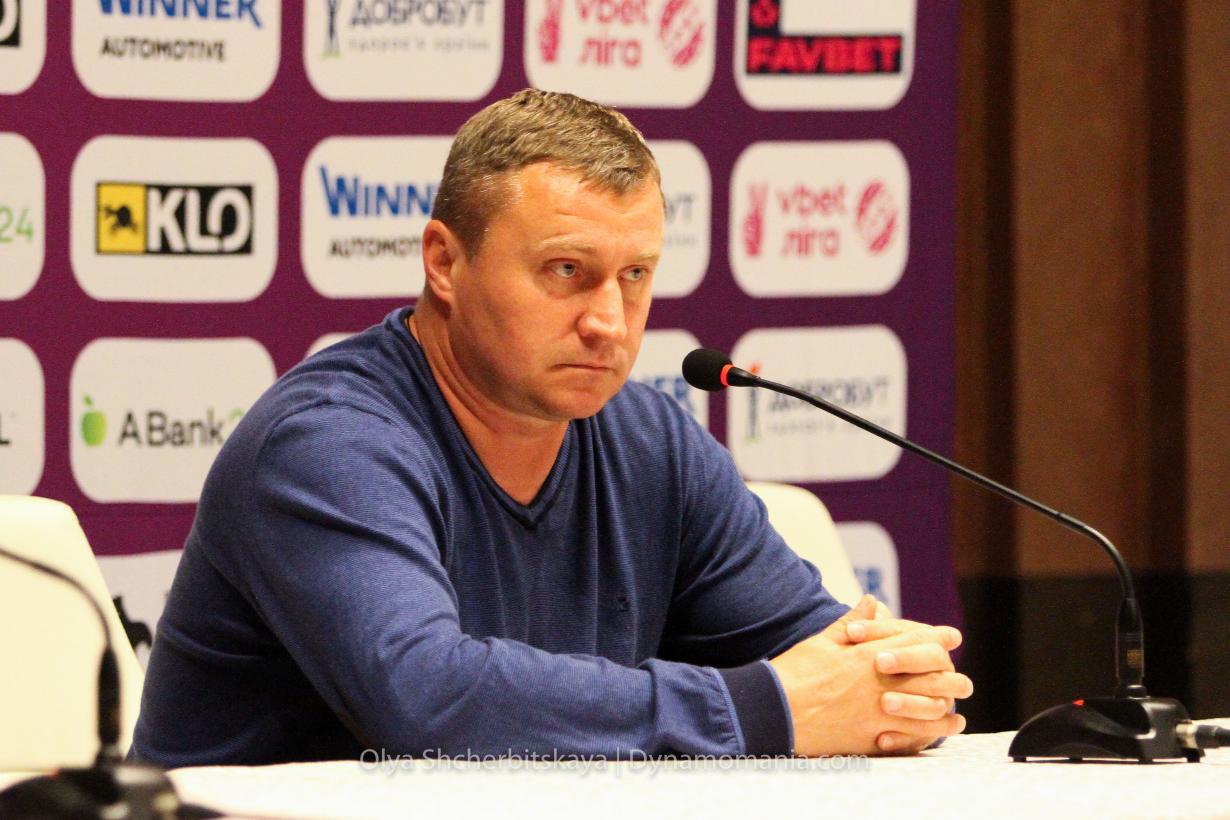
- Hura in 2021

Personal information
- Full name: Yuriy Volodymyrovych Hura
- Date of birth: 8 August 1976 (age 50)
- Place of birth: Oleksandriia, Ukrainian SSR
- Height: 1.83 m (6 ft 0 in)
- Position: Midfielder

Youth career
- Krystal Oleksandriya
- DYuSSh-2 Oleksandriya

Senior career*
Years	Team	Apps	(Gls)
1994–2000	Polihraftekhnika Oleksandriya	183	(17)
1994	→ Lokomotyv Znamyanka (loan)	5	(0)
1995	→ Polihraftekhnika-Krystal (loan)	11	(0)
1995	→ Olimpiya FC AES (loan)	7	(2)
2001	Zhenis Astana	5	(1)
2001	Dostyk Shymkent	16	(5)
2002	Urengoygasprom Anapa		
2003	Fakel Varva	8	(7)
2004	Yassi-Sairam Shymkent	27	(0)
2005–2007	Atyrau	58	(6)
2007	Vostok Oskemen	7	(0)
2008	Kholodnyi Yar Kamyanka	8	(0)
2009–2010	UkrAhroKom Holovkivka	12	(7)
2010	→ UkrAhroKom-2 Holovkivka	11	(10)

Managerial career
- 2011–2014: UkrAhroKom Holovkivka
- 2014–2021: Oleksandriya (assistant)
- 2021–2022: Oleksandriya
- 2024: Sheriff Tiraspol
- 2026: Bratslav Vinnytsia
- * Club domestic league appearances and goals

Yuriy Volodymyrovych Hura (Ukrainian: Юрій Володимирович Гура; born 8 August 1976) is a Ukrainian former professional football midfielder and manager.

== Playing career ==
=== Polihraftekhnika Oleksandriya ===
Hura started out playing in youth clubs of Oleksandriya in Central Ukraine and later joined city's main club Polihraftekhnika.

=== Kazakhstan ===
In 2000s he moved to Kazakhstan and for almost a decade disappeared from the Ukrainian football.

=== Return to Ukraine ===
In 2008 he returned to his home country playing in amateur competitions and eventually joined the newly created club UkrAhroKom Holovkivka from Oleksandriya suburbs.

== Managerial career ==
=== UkrAhroKom Holovkivka ===
At the end of 2010, Hura announced his retirement from playing career and became the head coach of the amateur club UkrAhroKom Holovkivka where he finished his playing career. During his term as head coach of the small club Hura managed to bring them from amateurs to the second professional tier Ukrainian First League.

=== Oleksandriya ===
Following completion of the 2013–14 season, UkrAhroKom Holovkivka was merged with PFC Oleksandriya to form Oleksandriya and Hura joined the coaching staff of new club coaching youth reserve. After dismissal of Volodymyr Sharan in May 2021 Hura became the head coach of Oleksandriya.

== Honours ==
=== Player ===
==== Lokomotyv Znamianka ====
- Kirovohrad Oblast Championship: 1993–94

==== Zhenis Astana ====
- Kazakhstan Premier League: 2001
- Kazakhstan Cup: 2000–01

==== Urengoygasprom Anapa ====
- Krasnodar Krai Cup: 2002
- Krasnodar Krai Super Cup: 2002
- Krasnodar Krai Championship runner-up: 2002

==== Fakel Varva ====
- Chernihiv Oblast Cup runner-up: 2003

==== Kholodnyi Yar Kamyanka ====
- Cherkasy Oblast Cup: 2008
- Cherkasy Oblast Championship runner-up: 2008

==== UkrAhroKom Holovkivka ====
- Kirovohrad Oblast Cup: 2009
- Kirovohrad Oblast Championship runner-up: 2009

=== Manager ===
==== UkrAhroKom Holovkivka ====
- Ukrainian Second League runner-up: 2012–13
