= Zaychuk =

Zaychuk is an East Slavic surname. Notable people with the surname include:

- Boris Zaychuk (born 1947), Russian hammer thrower
- Vladyslav Zaychuk (born 1980), Ukrainian footballer
