= UkrAhroKom =

Ukrainian agricultural company group

Ukrahrokom
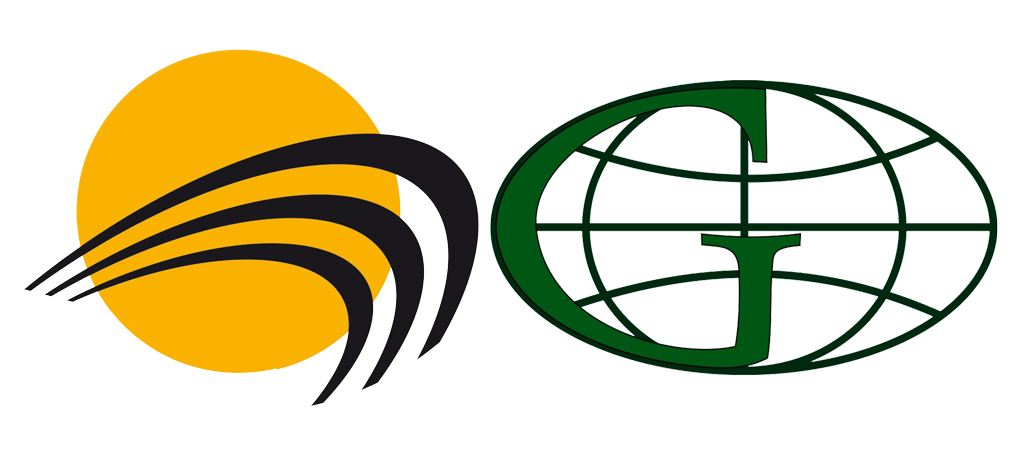
- Type: Private
- Industry: Agriculture
- Founded: 2000
- Headquarters: Ukraine
- Key people: Anatoliy Kuzmenko (General director), Yuriy Skychko (Director of "Hermes Treidynh")
- Website: Official website

UkrAhroKom (Ukrainian: УкрАгроКом) together with "Hermes-Treidynh" (Ukrainian: Гермес-Трейдинг) is a Ukrainian group of agriculture companies. It is headquartered in Oleksandriia Raion, Kirovohrad Oblast. In July 2018, the company was rebranded as AhroVista (Russian: АгроВиста).

The company is one of the largest agricultural companies in Ukraine.

== History ==
The company was founded in the village of Holovkivka. From 2008 to 2014, the holding owned the Football Club UkrAhroKom, and merged with FC Oleksandriya in 2014. Following the merger, the company became the title sponsor of FC Oleksandriya. Football matches would be held for the professional football club as well as other local teams.

In 2015, UkrAhroKom secured a long-term loan from the Export–Import Bank of the United States to purchase modern elevator systems.

== Infrastructure ==
- Svitlovodsk river terminal (grain elevator)
- Sharovka grain elevator
- UkrAhroKom grain elevator

== Charity activity ==
The company has been the title sponsor for various sports clubs throughout Europe and finances all events held by these sports organizations.

== See also ==
- FC UkrAhroKom Holovkivka
