= Kirovohrad Oblast Football Association =

Association football governing body in Ukraine

Kirovohrad Oblast Football Association is the governing body of Association football in the region of Kirovohrad Oblast, Ukraine. The association is a member of the Regional Council of UAF and the collective member of the UAF itself.

== Previous Champions ==
- 1960 FC Shakhtar Oleksandriya
- 1961 FC Shakhtar Oleksandriya (2)
- 1962 FC Shakhtar Dymytrove
- 1963 FC Shakhtar Dymytrove (2)
- 1964 FC Shakhtar Dymytrove (3)
- 1965 (no data)
- 1966 (no data)
- 1967 FC Spartak ShVLP TsA Kirovohrad
- 1968 (no data)
- 1969 FC Lokomotyv Znamianka
- 1970 FC Avanhard Svitlovodsk
- 1971 FC Avanhard Svitlovodsk (2)
- 1972 FC Lokomotyv Znamianka (2)
- 1973 (no data)
- 1974 FC Radyst Kirovohrad
- 1975 FC Radyst Kirovohrad (2)
- 1976 FC Spartak Kirovohrad (2)
- 1977 FC Radyst Kirovohrad (3)
- 1978 FC Lokomotyv Znamianka (3)
- 1979 FC Shakhtar Oleksandriya (3)
- 1980 (no data)
- 1981 FC Shakhtar Oleksandriya (4)
- 1982 (no data)
- 1983 FC Radyst Kirovohrad (4)
- 1984 FC Lokomotyv Znamianka (4)
- 1985 (no data)
- 1986 (no data)
- 1987 FC Khimik Kirovohrad
- 1988 (no data)
- 1989 FC Shakhtar Oleksandriya (5)
- 1990 FC Polihraftekhnika Oleksandriya
- 1991 FC Kranobudivnyk Oleksandriya
- =independence of Ukraine=
- 1992 FC Chervona Zirka Kirovohrad
- 1993 FC Chervona Zirka Kirovohrad (2)
- 1993-94 FC Lokomotyv Znamianka (5)
- 1994-95 FC Kooperator Novomyrhorod
- 1995-96 FC Lokomotyv Znamianka (6)
- 1996-97 FC Burevisnyk-Elbrus Kirovohrad
- 1997-98 FC Burevisnyk-Elbrus Kirovohrad (2)
- 1998-99 FC Yulia-Novator Bobrynets
- 1999 FC Polihraftekhnika-2 Oleksandriya
- 2000 FC Artemida Kirovohrad
- 2001 FC Ikar-MAKBO 94 Kirovohrad
- 2002 FC Ikar-MAKBO Kirovohrad (2)
- 2003 FC Ikar-MAKBO Kirovohrad (3)
- 2004 FC Ikar-MAKBO Kirovohrad (4)
- 2005 FC Zorya Haivoron
- 2006 FC Saturn Chervona Kamianka
- 2007 FC Oleksandriya-Ametyst
- 2008 FC Oleksandriya-Ametyst (2)
- 2009 FC Zorya Haivoron (2)
- 2010 FC UkrAhroKom Holovkivka
- 2011 FC Lokomotyv-Khlibodar Znamianka (7)
- 2012 FC Burevisnyk Petrove
- 2013 FC Burevisnyk Petrove (2)
- =Russo-Ukrainian War=
- 2014 FC AF Pyatykhatska Volodymyrivka
- 2015 FC Inhulets-2 Petrove (2)
- 2016 FC Nova Politsiya Kropyvnytskyi
- 2017 FC Vilshanka
- 2018 FC UkrAhroKom Holovkivka (2)
- 2019 FC Zirka Kropyvnytskyi
- 2020 FC Lokomotyv-SVT Pomichna
- 2021 FC Inhul-Ahro-Lend Berezivka
- =full-scale Russian invasion=
- 2023 FC SKIF Sokolivske

=== Top winners ===
- 7 - FC Lokomotyv-(Khlibodar) Znamianka
- 5 - FC Shakhtar Oleksandriya
- 4 - FC Radyst Kirovohrad
- 4 - FC Ikar-MAKBO (94) Kirovohrad
- 3 - FC Shakhtar Dymytrove
- 2 - 9 clubs (Spartak, Avanhard, UkrAhroKom, Inhulets-2, Burevisnyk, Zorya, Ametyst, Burevisnyk-Elbrus, Chervona Zirka)
- 1 - 11 clubs (Zirka, Vilshanka, Nova Politsiya, Saturn, Artemida, Polihraftekhnika-2, Yulia-Novator, Kooperator, Lokomotyv-SVT, Inhul-Ahro-Lend, SKIF)

== Professional clubs ==
locations of all professional clubs and "teams of maters"
- FC Zirka Kropyvnytskyi, 1958-1961, 1963-2006, 2008–2019 (59 seasons)
- FC Dynamo Kirovohrad, 1962 (a season)
- FC Shakhter Oleksandriya, 1962-1970 (9 seasons)

- FC Oleksandriya (Polihraftekhnika), 1992–2003, 2004– (32 seasons)
  - Oleksandriya-2, 2024– (a season)
- MFC Oleksandriya, 2004–2006 (2 seasons)
- FC Olimpik Kirovohrad, 2007–2008 (a season)
- FC UkrAhroKom Holovkivka, 2011–2014 (3 seasons)
- FC Inhulets Petrove, 2015– (10 seasons)
  - FC Inhulets-2 Petrove, 2016–2018 (2 seasons)

== Other clubs at national/republican level ==
Note: the list includes clubs that played at republican competitions before 1959 and the amateur or KFK competitions after 1964. Until September of 1939 Kirovohrad Oblast was part of Mykolaiv Oblast.

- Kirovohrad/Kirovo, 1936–1938
- Silmash Kirovohrad, 1939, 1940
- Dynamo Kirovohrad, 1946, 1947
- Shakhtar Oleksandria, 1948, 1949, 1956–1959, 1971 – 1985, 1988 – 1990
- Lokomotyv Znamianka, 1948, 1949, 1969, 1970, 1973, 1974, 1976, 1978 – 1983, 1985 – 1988, 1992/93 – 1998/99
- Traktor Kirovohrad, 1948–1952
- Lokomotyv Haivoron, 1949
- Urozhai Kirovohrad, 1949
- Torpedo Kirovohrad, 1953–1957
- Avanhard Kirovohrad, 1958
- Dnipro KremHES (KremHESbud), 1959, 1964, 1971 – 1973
- Chervona Zirka Kirovohrad, 1959
- Spartak Kirovohrad, 1965, 1967, 1968, 1974
- Aviator Kirovohrad, 1966
- Avanhard Svitlovodsk, 1971 – 1973
- Radyst Kirovohrad, 1975 – 1984, 1986 – 1988, 1990
- Yatran Kirovohrad, 1979, 1980
- Khimik Kirovohrad, 1989
- Polihraftekhnika Oleksandria (Polihraftekhnika-2/Krystal), 1991, 1992/93, 1994/95
- Kolos Oleksandrivka, 1991
- Krasnobudivnyk Oleksandria, 1992/93
- Sotel Kirovohrad, 1996/97
- Herkules Novoukrainka, 1998/99, 2000, 2001
- Ikar Kirovohrad, 1998/99, 2002, 2003
- Artemida Kirovohrad, 2000
- Mekhanizator Kamyshuvate, 2001
- Zirka Kirovohrad, 2007, 2019/20 – 2024/25
- Olimpik Kirovohrad, 2007, 2009 – 2012, 2014, 2017/18 – 2019/20
- Ametyst Oleksandria, 2008
- UkrAhroKom Holovkivka, 2010, 2011
- Burevisnyk Petrove, 2013, 2014
- Inhulets Petrove (Inhulets-2/Inhulets-3), 2014, 2015, 2016, 2016/17
- Ahrotekh Tyshkivka, 2023/24, 2024/25

== See also ==
- FFU Council of Regions
