= FC Helios Kharkiv =

Ukrainian football club

Helios Kharkiv
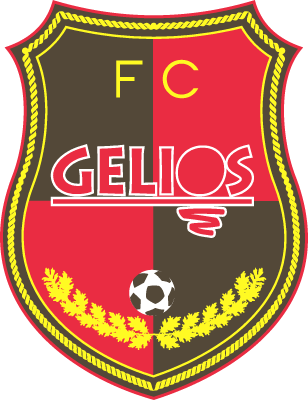
- Full name: FC Helios Kharkiv
- Founded: 2002
- Ground: Helios Arena, Kharkiv
- Capacity: 2,057
- Chairman: Oleksandr Hellstein
- League: Championship of Kharkiv
- 2019: 10th
Home colours	Away colours

FC Helios Kharkiv (FC Gelios) is a Ukrainian football club located in Kharkiv, Ukraine. From 2003 to 2018 the club competed at professional level. In 2018 it was expected to be succeeded by FC Kobra Kharkiv, but unsuccessfully. FC Helios dissolved its professional team, but kept its football academy which competes at regional level.

== History ==
=== Helios Kharkiv ===
FC Helios was founded in December 2002 by Oleksandr Hellstein. The club was named after Helios. The team quickly progressed through amateur competitions including the Kharkiv Aviation Institute tournament and Amateur Championship of Ukraine and in 2003 the club advanced to play in the Druha Liha C. After finishing the 2004–05 Druha Liha C season with a record of 25 wins, 2 ties, and only one loss, Helios advanced to the Persha Liha.

On 13 June 2018, FC Helios Kharkiv received license in participation of the 2018–19 Ukrainian First League.

=== Kobra Kharkiv ===
2018 logo, as FC Kobra Kharkiv.

On 5 July 2018, in news media it was announced that the place of FC Helios Kharkiv will play in the 2018–19 Ukrainian First League FC Kobra Kharkiv, while the new club's legal address will remain of Helios. The following replacement was initially intended to be as the "Veres Rivne – Lviv swap". On 9 July 2018, the PFL press service announced that Helios Kharkiv is finishing the process of changing its name to Kobra Kharkiv, under which it is going to compete in the First League and playing at the Helios Arena. Nonetheless on 18 July 2018, when the president of PFL Serhiy Makarov was asked about Kobra Kharkiv due to lack of information about the prospective project, he answered that the PFL is constantly in communication with the leadership of Helios and potential new owners. Makarov noted that agreement was not yet reached, but new leadership confirmed its intentions to develop the club.

On 28 July 2018, all of sudden the PFL press service announced that Kobra will play MFC Mykolaiv at Sonyachny Stadium instead of Helios Arena as the PFL informed before.

On 9 August 2018, in news media appeared information that the club would be withdrawing from competitions as the new prospective owners do not hurry to accept the ownership of the club, while there are rumors that all its administrative and playing staff has already left the club. Following that news statement, the Kobra club president Serhiy Vashchenko held a briefing at the House of Football where he refuted the information about the club's withdrawal stating that the club has not been, is not, and won't be withdrawing.

On 21 August 2018, more clarification about the whole Kobra Kharkiv affair in the First League was provided by the president of original Kobra Kharkiv Serhiy Vashchenko after de facto withdrawal who stated, "What depended on me, I did. The club was ready to go and host games. But I am not the owner of football club Kobra that earlier was Helios. I do not run the club. If someone was telling tales about the stadium in Kharkiv was inaccessible to us because we owe everybody, that is a lie. Let those people say it to my eyes. We were ready to host that Hirnyk-Sport at Sonyachnyi Stadium. The rent was already prepaid. But Helshtein gave a letter to the PFL that Kobra cannot host the game. Then he sent another letter that Kobra cannot leave for the game with Zirka. You understand better that if two times we do not appear for a game, we automatically being withdrawn." Vashchenko also noted that transition of the club was not yet finished due to disagreement on few issues (We with Helshtein have an agreement in financial field. Yet those issues we did not resolve. I think, we won't resolve them. He has own position, and I have mine).

After playing only three games in the First League, the newly renamed Helios (Kobra) finally withdrew completely by default, while the original Kobra Kharkiv continues to play in the Kharkiv Oblast championship and entered the 2018–19 Ukrainian Football Amateur League. Later in 2018 the amateur squad Kobra Kharkiv also withdrew from competitions.

In relations to withdrawal of Kobra (former Helios) from competitions of the First League, the Professional Football League of Ukraine filed documents against Serhiy Vashchenko to the Football Federation of Ukraine Control and Disciplinary Committee (FFU CDC). The FFU CDC adopted decision to close the case for the lack of requirements to review the case and passed the documents to the FFU Committee of Ethics and Fair play for further review.

=== Helios-Akademiya Kharkiv ===
In addition to all, the junior squad of Helios, Helios-Akademiya, that competes in regional competitions since 2011, changed its name to Helios Kharkiv in August 2018.

== Colors and badge ==
FC Helios Kharkiv's colors are red, black and white and gold.

== Stadiums ==
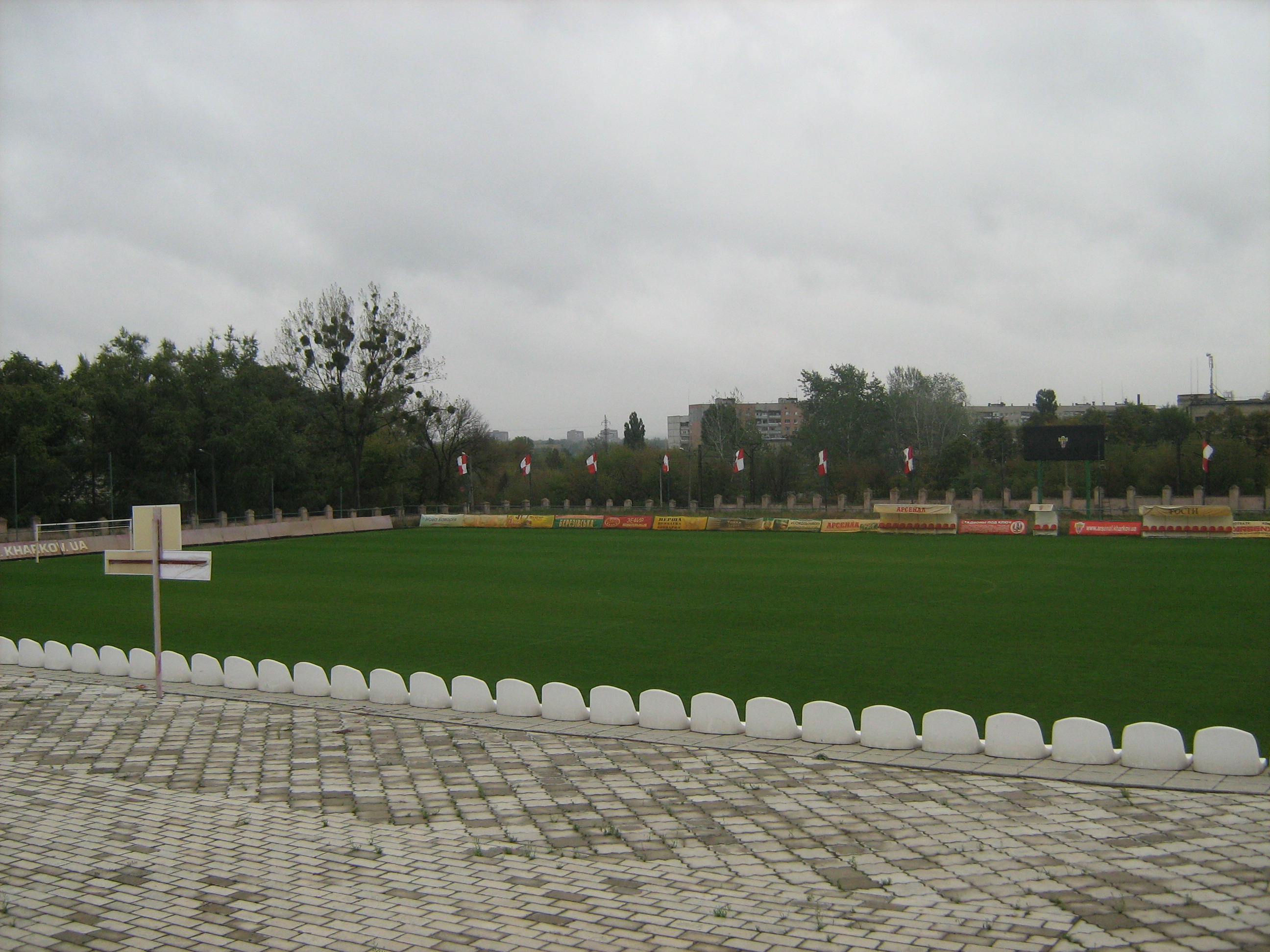
Helios-Arena, Kharkiv (formerly Arsenal-Bavaria Stadium)

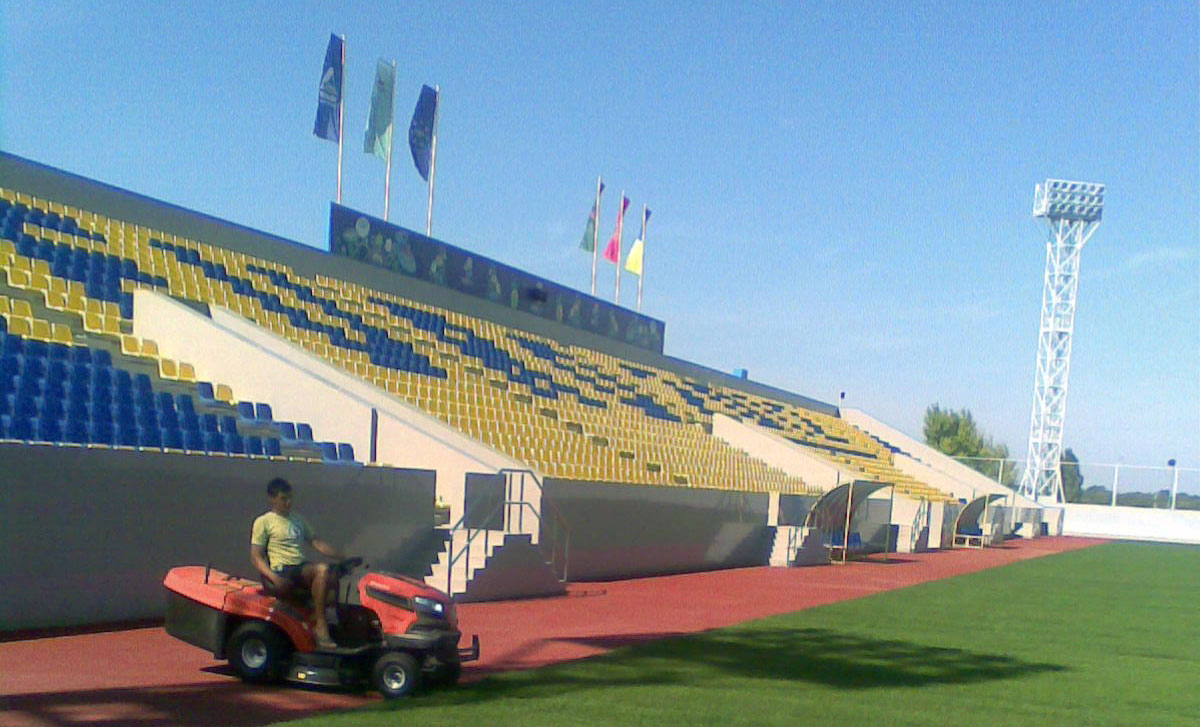
Sonyachny Stadium

From its foundation the club has been playing at the KhTZ Stadium and in 2006-2008 at the Dynamo Stadium.

In 2008 the club was temporarily relocated to the Hazovyk Stadium in Krasnokutsk when the Dynamo Stadium was contracted by FC Kharkiv and put for renovation. For the Ukrainian First League 2009-10 season Helios relocated back to Kharkiv and played at the Arsenal-Bavaria Stadium. The former owner of the facility, Arsenal Kharkiv moved to the Arsenal-Spartak Stadium. In July 2009 the Arsenal-Bavaria was renamed as Helios-Arena.

From 2012 to 2017 the home ground of Helios was Sonyachny Stadium.

In 2017 Helios moved back to the Helios-Arena and Sonyachny Stadium became a reserve home ground of the club. Located in a neighborhood Nova Bavaria, the Helios Arena is one of the oldest city's stadiums originally known as the Rope Factory Stadium.

== Last squad ==
As of 10 May 2022

Note: Flags indicate national team as defined under FIFA eligibility rules; some limited exceptions apply. Players may hold more than one non-FIFA nationality.

No.	Pos.	Nation	Player
1	GK	UKR	Denys Sydorenko
5	DF	UKR	Serhiy Loboyko (captain)
8	MF	UKR	Vitaliy Subochev
9	FW	UKR	Oleksandr Lebedenko
10	MF	UKR	Anton Kicha
11	FW	UKR	Denys Oliynyk
15	MF	UKR	Ivan Bykov
16	FW	UKR	Vadym Abelentsev
17	FW	UKR	Serhiy Kravchenko
18	MF	UKR	Dmytro Hrankin

No.	Pos.	Nation	Player
19	MF	UKR	Ihor Koshman
20	MF	UKR	Ihor Lutsenko
21	GK	UKR	Serhiy Pohorilyi
23	MF	UKR	Vladyslav Zaychuk
24	MF	UKR	Anton Kotlyar
27	MF	UKR	Volodymyr Shopin
29	DF	UKR	Illya Hlushytskyi (on loan from Shakhtar)
51	GK	UKR	Mykyta Ovcharov
71	GK	UKR	Maksym Yerokhin
99	MF	UKR	Artem Kozlov

== Honors ==
- Ukrainian Druha Liha
  - Champions (1) 2004/05 (Group C)

== League and cup history ==
Season	Div.	Pos.	Pl.	W	D	L	GS	GA	P	Domestic Cup	Europe	Notes
Founded as FC Helios Kharkiv
2003	4th	1	8	6	1	1	15	3	19			
2003–04	3rd "C"	6	30	15	7	8	41	31	52	1/32 finals		
2004–05	3rd "C"	1	28	25	2	1	64	18	77	1/32 finals		Promoted
2005–06	2nd	12	34	12	8	14	26	35	44	1/32 finals		
2006–07	2nd	7	36	17	7	12	45	36	58	1/32 finals		
2007–08	2nd	14	38	13	8	17	31	40	47	1/16 finals		
2008–09	2nd	15	32	8	6	18	28	44	30	1/16 finals		
2009–10	2nd	10	34	12	10	12	42	47	46	1/32 finals		
2010–11	2nd	15	34	10	10	14	31	44	40	1/32 finals		
2011–12	2nd	9	34	13	9	12	53	45	48	1/32 finals		
2012–13	2nd	10	34	12	13	9	33	21	49	1/16 finals		
2013–14	2nd	9	30	10	11	9	29	35	41	1/32 finals		
2014–15	2nd	7	30	12	8	10	30	25	44	1/16 finals		
2015–16	2nd	5	30	13	12	5	33	24	51	1/8 finals		
2016–17	2nd	4	34	16	10	8	31	22	58	1/32 finals		
2017–18	2nd	9	34	14	4	16	35	43	46	1/16 finals		
2018–19	2nd	Attempted to be reorganised as FC Kobra Kharkiv but was expelled										

== Coaches ==
- (Ukraine) Valentyn Kryachko (2003)
- (Ukraine) Rinat Morozov (2003–04)
- (Ukraine) Ihor Nadeyin (2004–05)
- (Ukraine) Volodymyr Shekhovtsov (2005)
- (Ukraine) Rostyslav Lysenko (2005–06)
- (Ukraine) Oleksandr Sevidov (2006–07)
- (Ukraine) Ihor Nadeyin (2007)
- (Ukraine) Yuriy Pohrebnyak (2007–08)
- (Ukraine) Volodymyr Shekhovtsov (2008–09)
- (Ukraine) Serhiy Kandaurov (2009–10)

- (Ukraine) Volodymyr Shekhovtsov (caretaker) (2010)
- (Ukraine) Roman Pokora (2010–11)
- (Ukraine) Volodymyr Shekhovtsov (caretaker) (2011)
- (Ukraine) Volodymyr Shekhovtsov (2011–12)
- (Ukraine) Serhiy Yesin (caretaker) (2012–13)
- (Ukraine) Serhiy Yesin (2013–15)
- (Ukraine) Serhiy Syzykhin (2015–2017)
- (Ukraine) Ihor Rakhayev (2017–2018)
- (Ukraine) Anatoliy Seryohin (2018)
