= Serhiy Ponomarenko =

Ukrainian footballer

Personal information
- Date of birth: 18 December 1983 (age 42)
- Place of birth: Vyshhorod, Ukrainian SSR
- Height: 1.76 m (5 ft 9 in)
- Position: Defender

Senior career*
Years	Team	Apps	(Gls)
2001	Dinaz Vyshhorod	17	(2)
2002–2004	Tiraspol	14	(0)
2006	Nafkom Brovary	2	(0)
2007–2008	Smorgon	47	(0)
2009	Shakhtyor Soligorsk	7	(0)
2010	Torpedo Zhodino	20	(0)
2011	Prykarpattya Ivano-Frankivsk	6	(0)
2011–2013	UkrAhroKom Holovkivka	49	(1)
2014	Bucha	16	(0)
2015	Dinaz Vyshhorod	18	(0)
2016	Sokil Mykhailivka-Rubezhivka (amateurs)		
2017–2019	Chaika Petropavlivska Borshchahivka	43	(3)
- * Club domestic league appearances and goals as of 31 December 2019

Serhiy Ponomarenko (Ukrainian: Сергій Пономаренко; born 18 December 1983) is a Ukrainian former professional footballer.
