= Nicolae Nemerenco =

Moldovan footballer

Personal information
- Full name: Nicolae Nemerenco
- Date of birth: 26 October 1992 (age 34)
- Place of birth: Chișinău, Moldova
- Height: 1.90 m (6 ft 3 in)
- Position: Forward

Team information
- Current team: Dacia Buiucani
- Number: 10

Senior career*
Years	Team	Apps	(Gls)
2012–2015	Dacia Chișinău	7	(0)
2016–2017	Codru Lozova		
2017–2018	Sfântul Gheorghe	7	(0)
2018	Codru Lozova		
2018–2019	Suwaiq Club		
2019	Foresta Suceava		
2020–	Dacia Buiucani	22	(2)
- * Club domestic league appearances and goals as of 14:08, 1 June 2021 (UTC)

Nicolae Nemerenco (born 26 October 1992), is a Moldovan footballer who plays as a forward for Dacia Buiucani.

== Club statistics ==
- Total matches played in Moldovan First League: 7 matches – 0 goals
