= 2012–13 Ukrainian Second League =

Ukrainian Second League
- Season: 2012–13
- Country: Ukraine
- Teams: 24
- Champions: Desna Chernihiv
- Promoted: Desna Chernihiv; UkrAhroKom Holovkivka; Nyva Ternopil
- Relegated: ~~Yednist Plysky~~ (withdrew); ~~Obolon-2 Kyiv~~ (withdrew); ~~SKA Odesa~~ (withdrew); ~~FC Sevastopol-2~~ (withdrew); ~~Zhemchuzhyna Yalta~~ (expelled)
- Matches: 323
- Goals: 831 (2.57 per match)
- Top goalscorer: 29 – Stanislav Kulish (Stal)
- Biggest home win: Shakhtar-3 9–0 Enerhiya (Round 22)
- Biggest away win: Sevastopol-2 2–7 Stal (Round 4)
- Highest scoring: Stal 8–2 Zhemchuzhyna (Round 26)
- Longest winning run: 7 – UkrAhroKom (Round 6–9, 11–13)
- Longest unbeaten run: 20 – Desna (First Stage)
- Longest losing run: 7 – Makiyivvuhillya (Round 6–12)
- Highest attendance: 6,000 Ternopil – Yednist' (Round 3)
- Lowest attendance: 20 SKA – Obolon-2 (Round 15)

The 2012–13 Ukrainian Second League was the 22nd season of 3rd level professional football in Ukraine. There are two groups of competition divided by region. The competition began on 13 July 2012 when Hirnyk-Sport Komsomolsk visited Sevastopol to play against FC Sevastopol-2 and lost 3–1.

== Competition information ==
=== Stage details ===
The competition for the 2012–13 season has been changed from previous seasons 2 stages.

The first stage will be a round robin competition similar to the previous seasons. The first stage of the competition will be played prior to the winter break. Each team will play with other teams two games (one home, one away).

The second stage will begin the spring of 2013. Teams will be divided into 4 groups. The first stage Groups A and B will be split into two pools one of teams playing for promotion to the First League, another of teams competing to remain in the Second League. Each team in a group will play with every other team two games in a round robin competition. The first two groups The top six teams of the first stage Groups A and B will advance. All points accumulated in the first stage will carry over. The champions of the Groups 1 and 2 will be directly promoted to the Ukrainian First League. The top teams of Groups 1 and 2 will also qualify for a championship play-off for the title of the Second League Champion as in the previous season.

The second place teams of both groups will qualify for a promotion/relegation play-off against the 15th and 16th placed teams of the 2012–13 Ukrainian First League. In the case of exclusion and/or withdrawal of teams from the First League during the season the format of the promotion/relegation play-off will change.

Teams will enter Groups 3 and 4 that are placed below the sixth place in Groups A and B in the first stage. Initially, These teams will play for the rights to remain in the Ukrainian Second League but due to the withdrawal for teams the competition was reformated for the second stage. (See Favbet tournament)

The Ukrainian Second League will be consolidated to twenty teams for the 2013–14 season.

=== Placing ===
The placing of teams in the table of all stages is done in the following order:

- number of accumulated points
- difference (GD) between goals for (GF) and goals allowed (GA)
- number of goals scored
- head-to-head results (points, goal difference, higher number of goals scored) among the teams that are tired after applying of the criteria above
- the League Fair-play ranking (based on all season matches)

The play-offs will consist of two games where each team will play one game at home and another away. The tiebreak rules will be based primarily on the record of the both games and secondarily on the goals scored in away game. In case when all the conditions will not identify a winner, the second game will go into an extra time and, if necessary, the penalty shootout.

== Team changes ==
=== Admitted teams ===
The following teams were admitted by the PFL after playing in the 2012 Ukrainian Football Amateur League and passing attestation.

- SKA Odesa – initial group stage (debut)
- Obolon-2 Kyiv – UPL youth competitions (returning after an absence of four seasons)
- Zhemchuzhyna Yalta – initial group stage (debut)
- FC Ternopil – initial group stage (returning after an absence of 11 seasons, previously as Ternopil-Nyva-2)

The teams admitted without playing at amateur league

- Poltava-2 Karlivka – (debut)
- Bastion Illichivsk – (returning after missing a season)

=== Relegated teams ===
The following teams were relegated from the 2011–12 Ukrainian First League:

- FC Lviv – 18th placed team (debut, successor of Hazovyk-Skala Stryi)
- Nyva Vinnytsia – withdrawn team petitioning to be reinstated (returning after an absence of two seasons)

=== Withdrawn/Omitted teams ===
- Prior to the season it was expected that FC Lviv (relegated from the 2011–12 Ukrainian First League), Nyva Vinnytsia (withdrew from PFL and then reapplied) and Bastion Illichivsk (license granted after absence of one year) would participate in the competition. All three teams informed that they would not enter the competition one day before the competition was to start.(13 July 2012)
- Prykarpattia Ivano-Frankivsk

=== Name changes ===
Last season FC UkrAhroKom Pryiutivka entered the PFL with the registered address of their parent company UkrAroKom in Pryiutivka. The club's home ground is located in Holovkivka. Prior to the start of the season the club changed its location with the PFL to Holovkivka.

=== Location map ===
Locations of team home grounds in Ukrainian Second League 2012–13

== First stage ==
=== Group A ===
Pos	Team	Pld	W	D	L	GF	GA	GD	Pts	Qualification
1	Desna Chernihiv	20	14	6	0	35	12	+23	48	Qualified for Second stage Group 1
2	Nyva Ternopil	20	11	5	4	29	17	+12	38	Qualified for Second stage Group 1
3	FC Ternopil	20	11	2	7	31	20	+11	35	Qualified for Second stage Group 1
4	Slavutych Cherkasy	20	10	4	6	26	18	+8	34	Qualified for Second stage Group 1
5	Skala Stryi	20	9	6	5	19	15	+4	33	Qualified for Second stage Group 1
6	Real Pharm Yuzhne	20	8	6	6	23	25	−2	30	Qualified for Second stage Group 1
7	Krystal Kherson	20	6	2	12	23	31	−8	20	Qualified for Second stage Group 3
8	Yednist' Plysky	20	5	5	10	17	30	−13	20	Withdrew (Note: Yednist' Plysky withdrew from the PFL after the first stage. The Vice President of the club informed that the club would return to the amateur leagues citing that there was no financial incentive to play in the second stage of the competition. (26 December 2012))
9	Obolon-2 Kyiv	20	5	3	12	21	30	−9	18	Withdrew (Note: Both Obolon-2 Kyiv and SCA Odesa withdrew from the PFL during the attestation meeting held in the winter break. Both teams' administration informed the PFL that they lacked sufficient funds to continue participating in the league. (21 February 2013))
10	Dynamo Khmelnytskyi	20	4	5	11	12	22	−10	17	Qualified for Second stage Group 3
11	SCA Odesa	20	4	2	14	17	33	−16	14	Withdrew

Source: Professional Football League of Ukraine
Rules for classification: 1st points; 2nd goal difference; 3rd goals scored; 4th fair play

==== Results ====
Home \ Away	DES	DKH	KRK	NVT	OB2	SCO	RPY	SKS	SLC	TNP	YEP
Desna Chernihiv		3–0	1–1	3–0	2–0	1–0	1–1	2–1	2–1	1–0	2–1
Dynamo Khmelnytskyi	2–3		1–0	0–1	0–0	1–0	1–1	0–1	0–1	0–1	1–0
Krystal Kherson	0–2	2–0		1–4	0–1	2–2	3–0	0–2	1–2	1–2	2–0
Nyva Ternopil	1–1	3–1	3–2		3–0 (Note: The Vice-President of Obolon Kyiv indicated that the team (Obolon-2 Kyiv) would not be playing their Round 20 match against Nyva Ternopil due to financial difficulties in the main club. Control-Disciplinary Committee of the FFU fines Obolon-2 Kyiv and awards a 3–0 technical victory to Nyva Ternopil. (29 November 2012))	1–0	0–1	1–0	0–0	2–0	0–0
Obolon-2 Kyiv (Note: Obolon-2 Kyiv play their home games at the club's home training base in Bucha, Kyiv Oblast.)	1–1	0–2	0–1	2–4		4–0	2–3	0–1	1–0	1–2	2–4
SCA Odesa	0–2	1–0	0–1	2–1	0–2		0–1	1–2	0–3	1–2	4–1
Real Pharm Yuzhne	0–3	0–0	3–2	2–0	2–1	1–3		1–1	0–1	2–1	3–0
Skala Stryi	1–1	1–1	1–0	1–1	1–0	2–0	0–0		1–0	0–2	2–0
Slavutych Cherkasy	0–0	1–0	3–1	1–1	2–3	3–2	2–0	2–1		3–0	0–1
FC Ternopil	1–2	1–1	4–0	0–1	1–0	1–1	3–1	3–0	3–0		0–2
Yednist' Plysky	1–2	2–1	0–2	0–2	1–1	2–0	1–1	0–0	1–1	0–4	

Updated to match(es) played on 24 November 2012. Source: PFL Druha League A calendar (in Ukrainian)
Legend: Blue = home team win; Yellow = draw; Red = away team win.

=== Group B ===
Pos	Team	Pld	W	D	L	GF	GA	GD	Pts	Qualification
1	UkrAhroKom Holovkivka	24	15	5	4	38	17	+21	50	Qualified for Second stage Group 2
2	Shakhtar-3 Donetsk	24	15	3	6	57	22	+35	48	Qualified for Second stage Group 2
3	Shakhtar Sverdlovsk	24	13	6	5	33	18	+15	45	Qualified for Second stage Group 2
4	Poltava-2 Karlivka	24	11	11	2	29	15	+14	44	Qualified for Second stage Group 2
5	Kremin Kremenchuk	24	12	7	5	39	21	+18	43	Qualified for Second stage Group 2
6	Myr Hornostayivka	24	13	3	8	37	33	+4	42	Qualified for Second stage Group 2
7	Hirnyk Kryvyi Rih	24	10	7	7	35	26	+9	37	Qualified for Second stage Group 4
8	Stal Dniprodzerzhynsk	24	10	3	11	47	30	+17	33	Qualified for Second stage Group 4
9	FC Sevastopol-2	24	7	2	15	25	44	−19	23	Qualified for Second stage Group 4
10	Enerhiya Nova Kakhovka	24	5	6	13	25	50	−25	21	Qualified for Second stage Group 4
11	Hirnyk-Sport Komsomolsk	24	5	3	16	25	50	−25	18	Qualified for Second stage Group 4
12	Makiyivvuhillya Makiyivka	24	5	2	17	21	58	−37	17	Qualified for Second stage Group 4
13	Zhemchuzhyna Yalta	24	4	4	16	21	48	−27	13 (Note: Zhemchuzhyna Yalta was given one month by the PFL to pay their league dues. The club failed to pay the dues in time and were docked 3 points. (21 August 2012))	Qualified for Second stage Group 4

Source: Professional Football League of Ukraine
Rules for classification: 1st points; 2nd goal difference; 3rd goals scored; 4th fair play

==== Results ====
Home \ Away	ENK	HIR	HIS	KRE	MKM	MYH	PO2	SE2	SHS	SH3	STD	UAP	ZHY
Enerhiya Nova Kakhovka		0–3	1–3	1–1	4–1	1–2	1–1	2–0	0–2	1–1	1–0	0–4	1–0
Hirnyk Kryvyi Rih	3–1		3–2	1–1	4–1	0–1	0–1	1–1	1–2	1–1	1–0	2–1	1–1
Hirnyk-Sport Komsomolsk	4–3	0–2		1–4	1–2	0–2	0–0	0–2	0–0	1–2	0–3	1–1	1–0
Kremin Kremenchuk	0–1	1–0	2–1		3–1	2–1	0–0	3–0	2–0	3–1	1–1	2–2	2–0
Makiyivvuhillya Makiyivka	2–2	1–4	0–3	2–1		1–2	0–2	0–1	1–2	0–2	3–2	0–2	3–2
Myr Hornostayivka	3–1	3–2	2–3	2–1	1–1		0–1	1–0	2–0	1–2	2–0	1–4	1–1
Poltava-2 Karlivka (Note: Poltava-2 Karlivka played their first six home games at Lokomotiv Stadium in Poltava. The club returned to their reconstructed home ground Mashynobudivnyk for the Round 15 fixture against Enerhiya.)	1–1	2–2	1–0	0–0	3–0	2–3		3–1	1–1	1–0	2–1	0–0	3–1
FC Sevastopol-2	3–0	1–1	3–1	1–2	1–2	1–2	0–1		0–1	1–4	2–7	1–0	2–1
Shakhtar Sverdlovsk	2–1	1–1	3–0	1–0	1–0	3–0 (Note: The President of Myr Hornostayivka indicated that the team would not be playing their Round 26 match against Shakhtar Sverdlovsk due to many of their players ill with flu. Control-Disciplinary Committee of the FFU fines Myr Hornostayivka and awards a 3–0 technical victory to Shakhtar Sverdlovsk. (29 November 2012))	0–0	1–0		3–1	2–2	1–1	0–1
Shakhtar-3 Donetsk	9–0	3–0	5–0	2–1	6–0	2–0	1–1	5–0	2–1		2–1	1–2	3–1
Stal Dniprodzerzhynsk	2–1	0–1	2–1	0–1	4–0	2–3	1–1	3–1	2–0	1–2		0–1	8–2
UkrAhroKom Holovkivka	2–0	1–0	3–0	1–1	2–0	2–1	2–0	3–1	0–3	1–0	0–2		1–0
Zhemchuzhyna Yalta (Note: Due to the reconstruction of the pitch at Avanhard Stadium, Yalta, starting on 1 October, Zhemchuzhyna Yalta moved their home games from Round 16 onwards to Fiolent Stadium in Simferopol.)	1–1	0–1	4–2	1–5	3–0	1–1	0–2	0–2	0–3	1–0	0–3 (Note: Players from Zhemchuzhyna Yalta boycotted their Round 13 match against Stal Dniprodzerzhinsk due to the club's failure of not paying their players in the last two months. Control-Disciplinary Committee of the FFU awards a 3–0 technical victory to Stal Dniprodzerzhynsk.)	0–2	

Updated to match(es) played on 25 November 2012. Source: PFL Druha Liha B Calendar
Legend: Blue = home team win; Yellow = draw; Red = away team win.

== Second stage ==
The draw for the second stage of season took place on 19 February 2013 and only for the top six teams of each group from the first stage. The second stage will commence 6 April 2013.

The Favbet tournament for Groups 3 and 4 was announced on 4 April 2013 for teams that did not qualify for Group 1 or Group 2.

=== Championship groups ===
==== Group 1 ====
Pos	Team	Pld	W	D	L	GF	GA	GD	Pts	Promotion or qualification
1	Desna Chernihiv	30	20	9	1	55	22	+33	69	Promoted to First League
2	Nyva Ternopil	30	16	9	5	47	22	+25	57	Qualified for Play-off game
3	Slavutych Cherkasy	30	15	7	8	47	28	+19	52	
4	FC Ternopil	30	15	4	11	43	34	+9	49	
5	Skala Stryi	30	10	7	13	25	41	−16	37	
6	Real Pharm Yuzhne	30	9	9	12	35	49	−14	36	

Source: Professional Football League of Ukraine
Rules for classification: 1st points; 2nd goal difference; 3rd goals scored; 4th fair play

===== Results =====
Home \ Away	DES	NVT	RPY	SKS	SLC	TNP
Desna Chernihiv		0–0	3–3	4–1	3–1	1–0
Nyva Ternopil	1–2		6–0	1–0	1–1	1–0 (Note: Round 1 matches postponed due to the condition of the pitches after the prolonged winter. Matches played after Round 6. (15 May 2013))
Real Pharm Yuzhne (Note: Real Pharm Yuzhne played all their Stage 2 matches at Viktor Dukov Stadium in Ovidiopol. (2 February 2013))	0–2	0–3		3–0	1–1	3–4
Skala Stryi	2–4	0–3	1–1		1–2	1–0
Slavutych Cherkasy	1–0	1–1	2–0	6–0		3–0
FC Ternopil	1–1	1–1	2–1	1–0	3–2	

Updated to match(es) played on 8 June 2013. Source: (in Ukrainian)
Legend: Blue = home team win; Yellow = draw; Red = away team win.

===== Top scorers =====
As of 8 June 2013

	Scorer	Goals (Pen.)	Team
1	(Ukraine) Bohdan Semenets	15 (3)	FC Ternopil
2	(Ukraine) Vasyl Prodan	11	Real Pharm Yuzhne
2	(Ukraine) Petro Kondratyuk	11 (7)	Desna Chernihiv
4	(Ukraine) Mykhaylo Serhiychuk	9	Slavutych Cherkasy
4	(Ukraine) Vasyl Tsyutsyura	9	Skala Stryi

==== Group 2 ====
Pos	Team	Pld	W	D	L	GF	GA	GD	Pts	Promotion or qualification
1	UkrAhroKom Holovkivka	34	20	7	7	51	25	+26	67	Promoted to First League
2	Shakhtar Sverdlovsk	34	19	9	6	47	26	+21	66	Qualified for Play-off game
3	Shakhtar-3 Donetsk	34	20	5	9	72	37	+35	65	
4	Poltava-2 Karlivka	34	13	16	5	41	27	+14	55	
5	Kremin Kremenchuk	34	12	14	8	46	31	+15	50	
6	Myr Hornostayivka	34	14	6	14	42	46	−4	48	

Source: Source: Professional Football League of Ukraine
Rules for classification: 1st points; 2nd goal difference; 3rd goals scored; 4th fair play

===== Results =====
Home \ Away	KRE	MYH	PO2	SHS	SH3	UAP
Kremin Kremenchuk		0–0	1–1	1–2	1–1	0–0
Myr Hornostayivka	1–0		0–0	1–1	0–3	0–2
Poltava-2 Karlivka	0–0	2–1		1–1	4–1	2–3
Shakhtar Sverdlovsk (Note: Shakhtar Sverdlovsk after 30 April played their Stage 2 matches at Avanhard Stadium in Rovenky. (30 April 2013))	2–2	2–1	2–1		2–0	1–0
Shakhtar-3 Donetsk	1–1	2–1	3–1	1–0		2–1
UkrAhroKom Holovkivka	2–1	3–0	0–0	0–1	2–0	

Updated to match(es) played on 8 June 2013. Source: PFL Druha Liha B Calendar
Legend: Blue = home team win; Yellow = draw; Red = away team win.

===== Top scorers =====
As of 8 June 2013

	Scorer	Goals (Pen.)	Team
1	(Ukraine) Vladyslav Korobkin	15 (3)	Shakhtar Sverdlovsk
1	(Ukraine) Andriy Draholyuk	15 (5)	Myr Hornostayivka
3	(Ukraine) Denys Bezborodko	13	Shakhtar-3 Donetsk
4	(Ukraine) Serhiy Bolbat	12	Shakhtar-3 Donetsk
5	(Ukraine) Vitaliy Ponomar	10	Shakhtar Sverdlovsk
5	(Ukraine) Yevhen Falkovskyi	10 (1)	UkrAhroKom Holovkivka

=== Championship final ===
The title of the Second League Champion was contested by the Group 1 and Group 2 winners at the end of the season. The matches were played in a home and away series. The draw for the matches was made on 6 June 2013.

Team 1	Agg.	Team 2	1st leg	2nd leg
Desna Chernihiv	3–3 (a)	UkrAhroKom Holovkivka	2–0	1–3

=== First leg ===
12 June 2013
18:00 EEST

Desna Chernihiv	2 – 0	UkrAhroKom Holovkivka
Ponomarenko 32' (o.g.); Chepurnenko 90+1'	Report (uk)

Yuri Gagarin Stadium, Chernihiv
Attendance: 1,200
Referee: Volodymyr Milanych (Mykolaiv)

=== Second leg ===
16 June 2013
18:00 EEST

UkrAhroKom Holovkivka	3 – 1	Desna Chernihiv
Lomko 11'; Hrishchenko 45+2'; Radevych 46'	Report (uk)	Bovtruk 40'

CSC Nika Stadium, Oleksandria (Note: UkrAhroKom Holovkivka moved their home match to the larger CSC Nika Stadium in Oleksandriya. (12 June 2013))
Attendance: 2,200
Referee: Mykola Kryvonosov (Kyiv)

3–3 on aggregate. Desna Chernihiv won on away goals.

=== Relegation groups ===
For sponsorship purposes the tournament titled as the Favbet Tournament and as previously planned is composed of two groups. Due to a number of withdrawals during the winter break the PFL had to make some adjustments in competition structure for the Second Stage for Groups 3 and 4 from the original plans. The changes were reviewed and accepted by the FFU Executive Committee on 3 April 2013. On 4 April 2013 a draw took place for clubs that placed at bottom halves after the autumn half of season. The four teams in Group 3 did not have their points transferred from the first stage of the competition, while the Group 4 teams have continued on with the points they gained in the first stage. In addition, relegation of teams from the Second League (Article 13, paragraph 17) was suspended. Games in both Groups (3 and 4) were scheduled to resume on 13 April 2013.

==== Group 3 ====
Pos	Team	Pld	W	D	L	GF	GA	GD	Pts	Status
1	Enerhia Nova Kakhovka	6	6	0	0	14	3	+11	18	
2	Krystal Kherson	6	4	0	2	13	7	+6	12	
3	Zhemchuzhyna Yalta	6	1	1	4	5	10	−5	4	Expelled (Note: Zhemchuzhyna Yalta were expelled from the PFL after they were denied attestation by league administration for the next season due to the club's financial situation.)
4	FC Dynamo Khmelnytskyi	6	0	1	5	1	13	−12	1	

Source: Professional Football League of Ukraine
Rules for classification: 1st points; 2nd goal difference; 3rd goals scored; 4th fair play

===== Results =====
Home \ Away	ENK	DKH	KRK	ZHY
Enerhiya Nova Kakhovka		2–0	3–1	2–1
Dynamo Khmelnytskyi	0–3		0–3	0–1
Krystal Kherson	1–2	0–3 (Note: The administration of Dynamo Khmelnytskyi indicated that the team would not be playing their Round 6 match against Krystal Kherson due to financial reasons. The Disciplinary Committee of the Football Federation of Ukraine award a 3–0 technical victory to Krystal Kherson. (11 June 2013))		2–1
Zhemchuzhyna Yalta	0–2	1–1	1–3	

Updated to match(es) played on May 25, 2013. Source: (in Ukrainian)
Legend: Blue = home team win; Yellow = draw; Red = away team win.

===== Top scorers =====
As of 25 May 2013

	Scorer	Goals (Pen.)	Team
1	Oleksandr Mukovozov	4	Enerhiya Nova Kakhovka
2	Vyacheslav Ozyum	3	Krystal Kherson
2	Artem Sitalo	3	Krystal Kherson

==== Group 4 ====
Pos	Team	Pld	W	D	L	GF	GA	GD	Pts	Status
1	Hirnyk Kryvyi Rih	32	14	8	10	49	37	+12	50	
2	Stal Dniprodzerzhynsk	32	15	4	13	63	40	+23	49	
3	Hirnyk-Sport Komsomolsk	32	10	4	18	39	57	−18	34	
4	Makiyivvuhillya Makiyivka	32	8	3	21	32	71	−39	27	
5	FC Sevastopol-2	32	7	4	21	30	63	−33	25	Withdrew (Note: The administration of FC Sevastopol withdrew their reserve team from the PFL after the main team was promoted to the Ukrainian Premier League. The reserves will compete in the Reserves competition.)

Source: Professional Football League of Ukraine
Rules for classification: 1st points; 2nd goal difference; 3rd goals scored; 4th fair play

===== Results =====
Home \ Away	HIR	STD	SE2	HIS	MKM
Hirnyk Kryvyi Rih		1–0	2–0	2–0	4–1
Stal Dniprodzerzhynsk	3–1		2–1	1–1	1–0
FC Sevastopol-2	2–2	2–5		0–4	0–0
Hirnyk-Sport Komsomolsk	2–1	2–0	2–0		2–1
Makiyivvuhillya Makiyivka	3–1	2–4	2–0	2–1	

Updated to match(es) played on 14 June 2013. Source: (in Ukrainian)
Legend: Blue = home team win; Yellow = draw; Red = away team win.

===== Top scorers =====
As of 8 June 2013

	Scorer	Goals (Pen.)	Team
1	(Ukraine) Stanislav Kulish	29 (3)	Stal Dniprodzerzhynsk
2	(Ukraine) Yuriy Kolomoyets (Note: First League club PFC Oleksandria signed Yuriy Kolomoyets during the winter break.)	16 (2)	Hirnyk Kryvyi Rih
3	(Ukraine) Hryhoriy Haranyan (Note: Hryhoriy Haranyan signed with Hirnyk Kryvyi Rih during the winter break.)	10	Stal/Hirnyk

== Promotion/relegation play-off ==
A promotion/relegation home and away play-off were played by the 2nd team in Group 1 and 2 of 2012–13 Ukrainian Second League against the 15th and 16th placed teams of the 2012–13 Ukrainian First League competition. Dynamo-2 Kyiv and FC Odesa qualified for the play-off. The draw for the play-off matches was held on 7 June.

=== Match #1 ===
==== First leg ====
12 June 2013
18:00 EEST

FC Odesa	0 – 2	Nyva Ternopil
	Report (uk)	H. Baranets 17'; Melnyk 60'

Spartak Stadium, Odesa
Attendance: 300
Referee: Serhiy Skyrda (Kharkiv)

==== Second leg ====
16 June 2013
19:30 EEST

Nyva Ternopil	4 – 1	FC Odesa
Kikot 22'; Yavorskyi 45+2'; Danyshchuk 62'; Tovkatskyi 86'	Report (uk)	Balabanov 64' (pen.)

City Stadium, Ternopil
Attendance: 5,500
Referee: Vitaliy Dyadenko (Kirovohrad)

6–1 on aggregate. Nyva Ternopil promoted to First League

=== Match #2 ===
==== First leg ====
12 June 2013
17:00 EEST

Shakhtar Sverdlovsk	1 – 1	Dynamo-2 Kyiv
Korobkin 57' (pen.)	Report (uk)	Morozenko 77'

Avanhard Stadium, Rovenky
Attendance: 500
Referee: Roman Bozhyk (Sevastopol)

==== Second leg ====
16 June 2013
19:00 EEST

Dynamo-2 Kyiv	1 – 0	Shakhtar Sverdlovsk
Morozenko 44'	Report (uk)

Lobanovsky Dynamo Stadium, Kyiv
Attendance: 2,300
Referee: Andriy Lisakovskyi (Odesa)

2–1 on aggregate. Shakhtar Sverdlovsk remain in Second League.

== See also ==
- 2012–13 Ukrainian Premier League
- 2012–13 Ukrainian First League
- 2012–13 Ukrainian Cup
