= 2019 Football Championship of Kirovohrad Oblast =

Football Championship of Kirovohrad Oblast
- Season: 2019
- Champions: FC Zirka Kropyvnytskyi

The 2019 Football Championship of Kirovohrad Oblast was won by FC Zirka Kropyvnytskyi.

== League table ==
Pos	Team	Pld	W	D	L	GF	GA	GD	Pts
1	Zirka Kropyvnytskyi (C)	8	5	2	1	31	8	+23	17
2	Shliakhovyk Oleksandriia	8	5	1	2	22	10	+12	16
3	FC Novoukrayinka	8	4	0	4	14	17	−3	12
4	Inhul-Ahro-Lend Berezivka	8	3	2	3	10	16	−6	11
5	Ahrotekh Tyshkivka	8	0	1	7	9	35	−26	1

Source: "Чемпіонат Кіровоградської області 2019". Footboom. Archived from the original on 2020-06-20.
(C) Champions
- FC Zirka Kropyvnytskyi played in the 2019–20 Ukrainian Football Amateur League.
