= Vladyslav Zaychuk =

Ukrainian footballer (born 1980)

Personal information
- Full name: Vladyslav Leonidovych Zaychuk
- Date of birth: 15 November 1980 (age 45)
- Place of birth: Makiivka, Ukrainian SSR, Soviet Union
- Height: 1.75 m (5 ft 9 in)
- Position: Midfielder

Team information
- Current team: Helios Kharkiv
- Number: 23

Senior career*
Years	Team	Apps	(Gls)
1997–1998	Shakhtar Makiivka	3	(0)
1999	Shakhtar-2 Donetsk	3	(0)
1999–2002	Mashynobudivnyk Druzhkivka	51	(4)
2002	Elektron Romny	14	(1)
2003–2005	Arsenal Kharkiv	53	(6)
2003–2004	→ Helios Kharkiv (loan)	5	(2)
2005	Kharkiv	2	(0)
2006–2017	Naftovyk-Ukrnafta Okhtyrka	242	(9)
2018–	Helios Kharkiv	0	(0)
- * Club domestic league appearances and goals as of 5 February 2018

Vladyslav Leonidovych Zaychuk (Ukrainian: Владислав Леонідович Зайчук; born 15 November 1980 in Makiivka, Donetsk Oblast, Ukrainian SSR) is a Ukrainian football midfielder who plays for Helios Kharkiv.
