= FC UkrAhroKom Holovkivka =

UkrAhroKom Holovkivka
- Full name: UkrAhroKom Holovkivka
- Founded: 2010
- Dissolved: 2014 (merged with Oleksandriya)
- Ground: Holovkivskyy Stadium
- Capacity: 628
- Chairman: Vitaliy Zmaha
- Manager: Yuriy Hura
- League: Ukrainian First League
- 2013–14: 8th

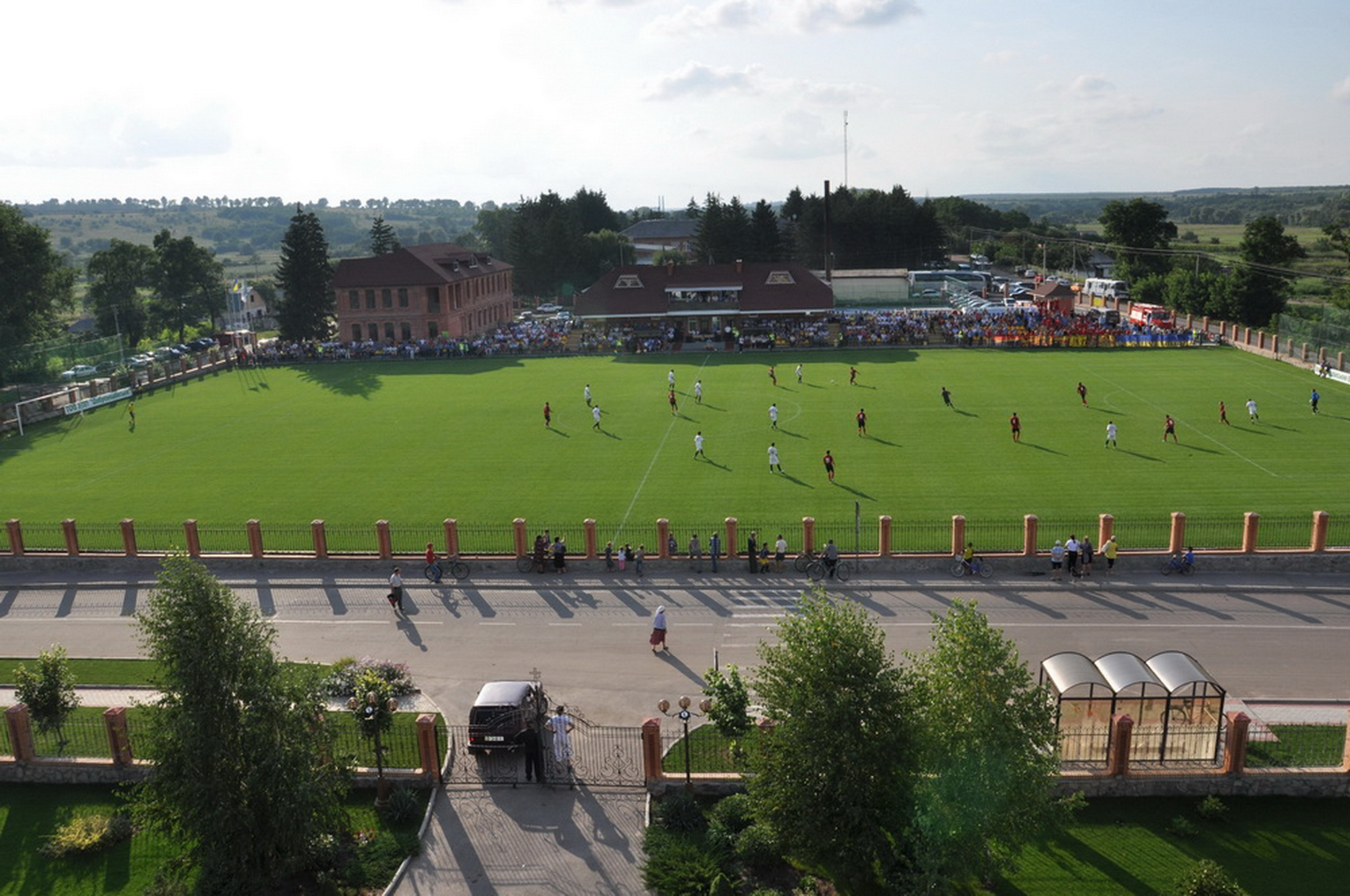
Holovkivsky Stadium, (view from a belfry in 2011) a week before the start of the Second League competitions

FC UkrAhroKom Holovkivka was a professional football club based in Holovkivka, Ukraine. The club was owned by UkrAhroKom, a Ukrainian agricultural company.

Prior to the start of 2014–15 Ukrainian First League season, UkrAhroKom Holovkivka was merged with PFC Oleksandriya, who were also competing in the Ukrainian First League into one club, and renamed themselves as FC Oleksandriya.

== History ==
The club was founded in 2010 and entered the second group of the Kirovograd Oblast championship.

In 2009, the club continued to compete in the Kirovohrad oblast championship. In May 2009, the team won the Kirovograd oblast Cup, and was granted the right to participate in the Ukrainian Amateur Cup, of where they reached the semifinals. In the 2009 Kirovohrad oblast championship, they finished second.

In 2010, the club won their second consecutive Kirovograd oblast Cup. The club announced its intention to become a professional one, and enter the Ukrainian Second League championship for the 2011–2012 season.

On June 20, 2011, the Central Council of the PFL team accepted the team's professional status. Originally, the club registered its address in the village of Pryiutivka in the Oleksandriya District, Kirovohrad oblast, which was around 40 kilometers away, for the 2012–13 Ukrainian Second League season, the club re-registered using the address in Holovkivka.
The club would be promoted to the Ukrainian First League in 2013.

=== Stadium ===
Home matches are held at the "Holovkivskyy" stadium, which has a capacity of 580 spectators and was opened on October 12, 2008.

== Honors ==
- Ukrainian Second League
  - Winners (1): 2012–13 (Group B)
- Kirovohrad Oblast Championship
  - Winners (1): 2010
  - Runners-up (1): 2009
- Kirovohrad Oblast Cup
  - Winners (3): 2009, 2010, 2011

== League and Cup history ==
| Season | Div. | Pos. | Pl. | W | D | L | GS | GA | P | Domestic Cup | Europe | Notes |
|---|---|---|---|---|---|---|---|---|---|---|---|---|
| 2010 | 4th Gr.2 | 3 | 6 | 2 | 1 | 3 | 7 | 14 | 7 | Amateur's Cup | | |
| 2011 | 4th Gr.2 | 4 | 10 | 5 | 0 | 5 | 20 | 12 | 15 | — | | |
| 2011–12 | 3rd "A" | 5 | 26 | 14 | 6 | 6 | 43 | 25 | 36 | 1/32 finals | | |
| 2012–13 | 3rd "B" | 1 | 24 | 15 | 5 | 4 | 38 | 17 | 50 | 1/8 finals | | |
| 2012–13 | 3rd "2" | 1 | 34 | 20 | 7 | 7 | 51 | 25 | 67 | 1/8 finals | | Promoted |
| 2013–14 | 2nd | 8 | 30 | 11 | 9 | 10 | 27 | 27 | 42 | 1/16 finals | | Merged with PFC Oleksandriya |
