= Ihor Zakharyak =

Ukrainian footballer (born 1964)

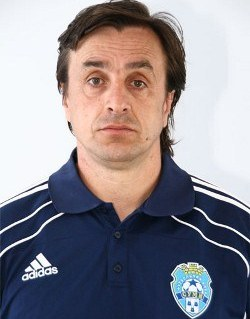

Personal information
- Full name: Ihor Volodymyrovych Zakharyak
- Date of birth: 9 May 1964 (age 62)
- Place of birth: Kerch, Ukrainian SSR
- Height: 1.89 m (6 ft 2 1/2 in)
- Position: Defender

Senior career*
Years	Team	Apps	(Gls)
1985	FC Ocean Kerch	18	(0)
1986	SC Tavriya Simferopol	1	(0)
1986–1989	FC Ocean Kerch	161	(9)
1990	FC Kuban Krasnodar	33	(0)
1991–1992	FC Avtomobilist Sumy	52	(2)
1993	FC Kolos Krasnodar	36	(0)
1994–1997	FC Yavir Krasnopilya	90	(7)

Managerial career
- 1998–1999: FC Yavir Sumy
- 1999–2002: FC Krasnodar-2000 (academy director)
- 2003–2004: FC Krasnodar-2000
- 2005–2006: FC Krasnodar-2000 (academy director)
- 2006–2007: FC Krasnodar-2000
- 2007: FC Kuban Krasnodar (reserves)
- 2008–2009: FC Baltika Kaliningrad (assistant)
- 2009: FC Krasnodar-2000
- 2010: FC Zhemchuzhina Sochi (assistant)
- 2011–2013: FC Sumy
- 2015: FC Shakhter Karagandy
- 2016–2017: FC Baltika Kaliningrad
- 2018–2020: FC Sokol Saratov
- 2020: FC Krasnodar (assistant)
- 2020–2022: FC Sokol Saratov
- * Club domestic league appearances and goals

Ihor Volodymyrovych Zakharyak (Ukrainian: Ігор Володимирович Захаряк; born 9 May 1964) is a Ukrainian football manager and a former player. He also holds Russian citizenship.

== Coaching career ==
On 5 December 2018, he was appointed manager of FC Sokol Saratov.
