= Serhei Nudnyi =

Moldovan footballer (born 1980)

Serhei Nudnyi Серге́й Нудный
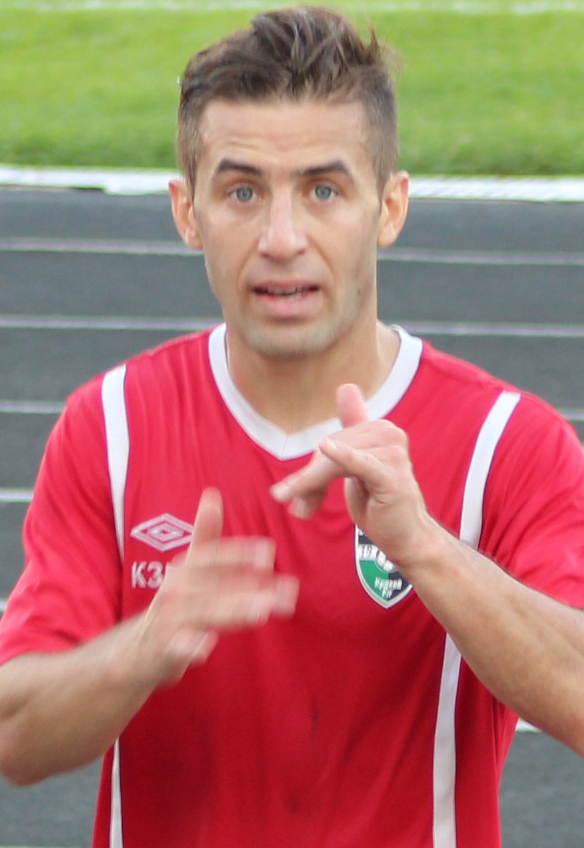
- Serhei Nudnii in 2014

Personal information
- Full name: Serhei Nudnyi
- Date of birth: 6 October 1980 (age 46)
- Place of birth: Rozdilna, Odesa Oblast, Ukrainian SSR
- Height: 1.70 m (5 ft 7 in)
- Position: Midfielder

Youth career
- 1998–2000: Sheriff Tiraspol

Senior career*
Years	Team	Apps	(Gls)
1999–2000	Sheriff Tiraspol	3	(0)
2000–2001	Haiduc-Sporting Chişinău	6	(0)
2001–2003	Agro-Goliador Chișinău	39	(4)
2004	Tiligul-Tiras Tiraspol	14	(0)
2004–2006	Zestafoni	49	(2)
2006–2007	Tiligul-Tiras Tiraspol	6	(0)
2007	→ Dinamo Minsk (loan)	1	(0)
2007–2008	Hapoel Rishon LeZion	4	(0)
2008	Tiligul-Tiras Tiraspol	9	(2)
2009	Chornomorets Odesa	15	(0)
2010	Feniks-Illichovets Kalinine	1	(0)
2010–2011	Sevastopol	5	(0)
2011–2012	Hoverla-Zakarpattia Uzhhorod	37	(2)
2012–2014	Tytan Armyansk	48	(14)
2014–2015	Hirnyk Kryvyi Rih	29	(8)
2020	Cahul-2005		
2021	Real Pharma Odesa	17	(2)
- * Club domestic league appearances and goals as of 24 November 2021

Serhei Nudnyi (Russian: Серге́й Нудный; born 6 October 1980) is a Moldovan former football midfielder.

== Career ==
Nudnyi is the product of the Tiraspol youth football school system. He signed a one-year contract with Ukrainian club Chornomorets in February 2009.
