= Volodymyr Ponomarenko =

Ukrainian footballer and coach

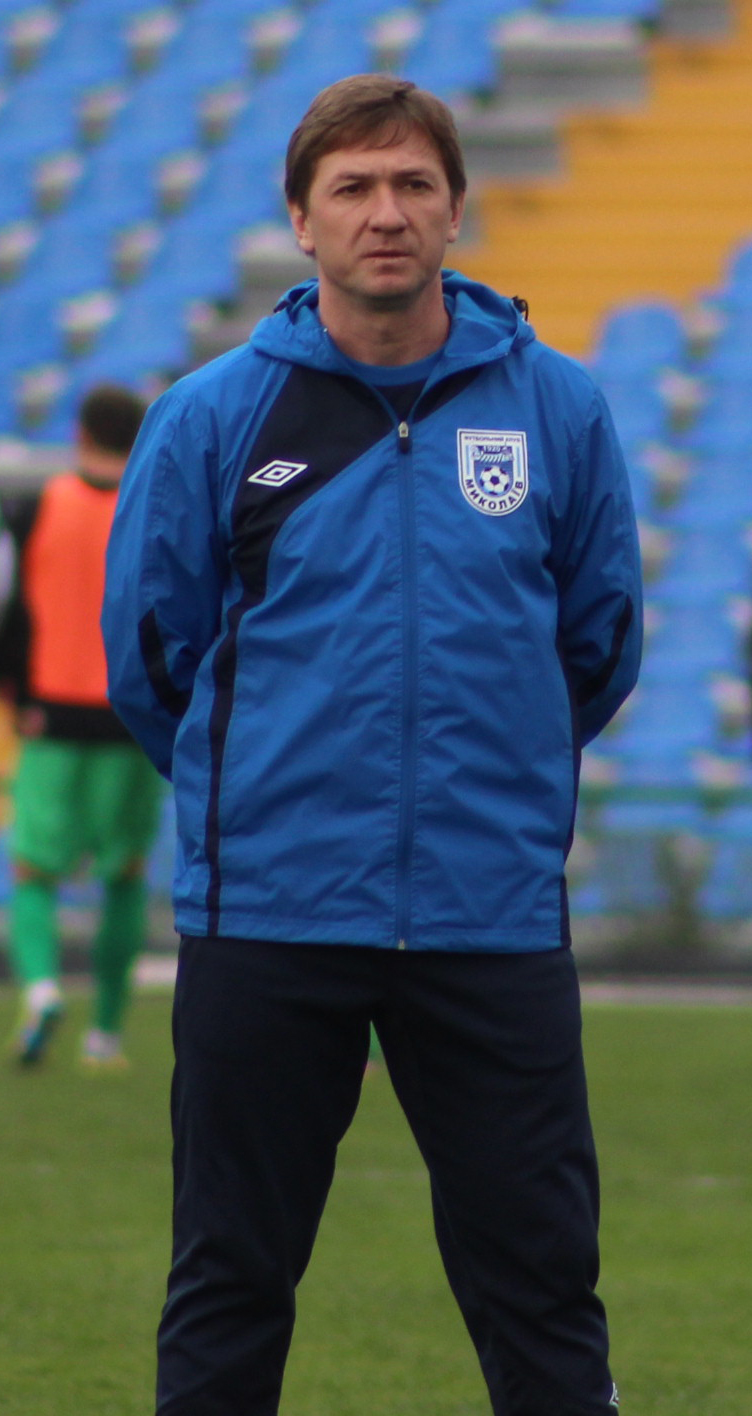

Personal information
- Full name: Volodymyr Mykolayovych Ponomarenko
- Date of birth: 29 October 1972 (age 54)
- Place of birth: Mykolaiv, Ukrainian SSR, Soviet Union
- Height: 1.74 m (5 ft 8 1/2 in)
- Position: Midfielder

Team information
- Current team: MFC Mykolaiv-2 (assistant)

Youth career
- Youth Sportive School #3 Mykolaiv
- Sudnobudivnyk Mykolaiv

Senior career*
Years	Team	Apps	(Gls)
1991–1992	Artania Ochakiv	70	(4)
1992–1998	Mykolaiv	221	(27)
1998–2001	Kryvbas Kryvyi Rih	85	(10)
2000	→ Kryvbas-2 Kryvyi Rih	1	(0)
2001–2003	Metalurh Donetsk	44	(2)
2002	→ Metalurh-2 Donetsk	1	(0)
2004–2006	Kryvbas Kryvyi Rih	17	(1)
2005	→ Tavriya Simferopol	8	(0)
2005–2006	→ Kryvbas-2 Kryvyi Rih	24	(1)
2006	Mykolaiv	13	(1)
Total		484	(46)

Managerial career
- 2005–2006: Kryvbas-2 Kryvyi Rih (ass't)
- 2007–2009: Mykolaiv (ass't)
- 2010–2013: Mykolaiv (ass't)
- 2013–2014: Mykolaiv (interim)
- 2014–2015: Mykolaiv (ass't)
- 2015–2018: Mykolaiv-2 (ass't)
- 2019: Mykolaiv-2
- 2019–: Mykolaiv-2 (ass't)
- * Club domestic league appearances and goals

Volodymyr Ponomarenko (Ukrainian: Володимир Миколайович Пономаренко; born 29 October 1972 in Mykolaiv, in the Ukrainian SSR of the Soviet Union – in present-day Ukraine) is a Ukrainian former footballer who played as a midfielder, and is currently the coach of MFC Mykolaiv-2 in the Ukrainian Second League.

Ponomarenko is the product of Mykolaiv's youth sportive school system. His first trainer was Viktor Shekhovtsev.

On 3 November 2013 he became the interim coach of MFC Mykolaiv in the Ukrainian First League. From 11 March 2014 he continues as assistant coach in the same club.
