= Volodymyr Shekhovtsov =

Ukrainian footballer and coach

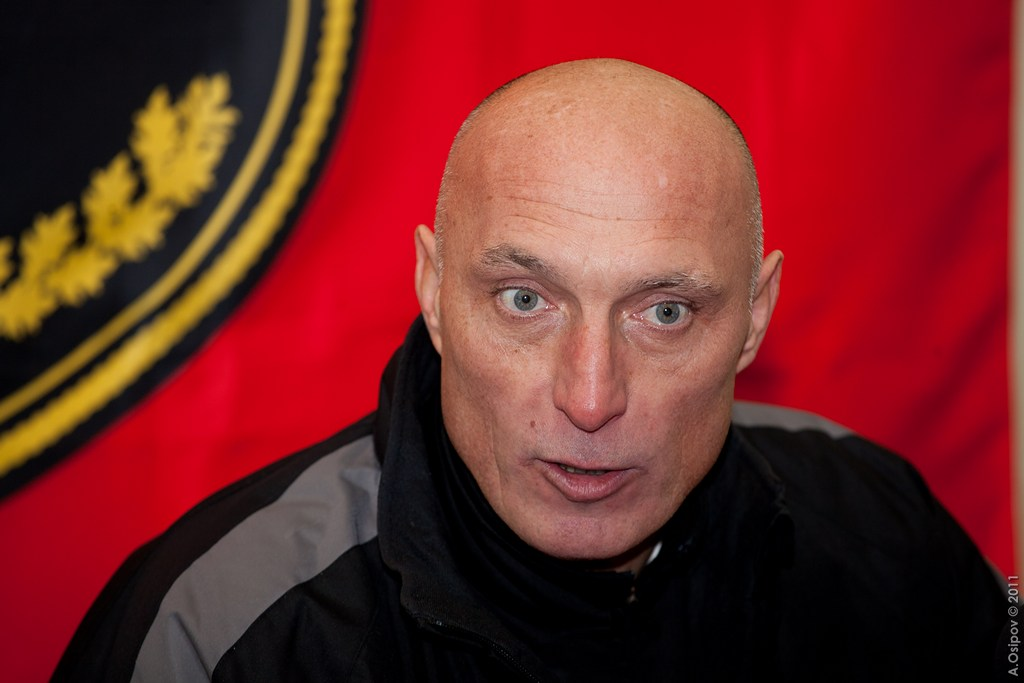

Personal information
- Full name: Volodymyr Viktorovych Shekhovtsov
- Date of birth: 3 December 1963 (age 62)
- Place of birth: Kharkiv, Ukrainian SSR
- Position: Defender

Senior career*
Years	Team	Apps	(Gls)
1990	FC Olympik Kharkiv	31	(0)
1992–1995	FC Oskil Kupiansk	27	(0)
1997	FC Zirka Smila	7	(0)

Managerial career
- FC Oskil Kupiansk
- FC Tselinnik Akmola
- 2005: FC Helios Kharkiv
- 2008–2009: FC Helios Kharkiv
- 2009: FC Helios Kharkiv (assistant)
- 2010: FC Helios Kharkiv (caretaker)
- 2011: FC Helios Kharkiv (caretaker)
- 2011–2013: FC Helios Kharkiv
- 2015–2017: FC Helios Kharkiv (assistant)
- * Club domestic league appearances and goals

Volodymyr Viktorovych Shekhovtsov (Ukrainian: Володи́мир Ві́кторович Шеховцо́в; born 3 December 1963 in Kharkiv) is a retired Ukrainian football (soccer) player and a current Ukrainian professional football coach.

On 12 September 2010, Shekovtsov was appointed for a third time as caretaker for club Helios Kharkiv in Ukrainian First League.
