= Serhiy Strashnenko =

Soviet footballer and coach (born 1953)

Personal information
- Full name: Serhiy Vasylyovych Strashnenko
- Date of birth: 8 September 1953 (age 73)
- Place of birth: Sumy, Ukrainian SSR, Soviet Union
- Position: Goalkeeper

Senior career*
Years	Team	Apps	(Gls)
1970–1975	FC Frunzenets Sumy		
1975	FC Chornomorets Odesa		
1976	FC Spartak Ivano-Frankivsk		
1976–1977	FC Hoverla Uzhhorod	67	(0)
1978–1979	FC Karpaty Lviv	18	(0)
1979–1980	Pakhtakor Tashkent FK	13	(0)
1981	FC Dnipro Dnipropetrovsk		
1981–1987	FC Zakarpattia Uzhhorod	171	(0)
1988–1990	FC Polissya Zhytomyr	105	(0)
1991–1992	FC Avtomobilist Sumy	55	(0)
1996	FC Ahrotekhservis Sumy	5	(0)

Managerial career
- 1993–1994: FC SBTS Sumy
- 1998: FC Zirka Kirovohrad (interim)
- 2003–2006: FC Spartak Sumy (ass't)
- 2005: FC Spartak Sumy (interim)
- 2006: FC Spartak Sumy (interim)
- 2012–: FC Barsa Sumy (academy)
- * Club domestic league appearances and goals

Serhiy Strashnenko (Ukrainian: Сергій Васильович Страшненко; born 8 September 1953) is a former professional Soviet football goalkeeper and coach.
