= Vadym Zayats =

Ukrainian footballer and manager

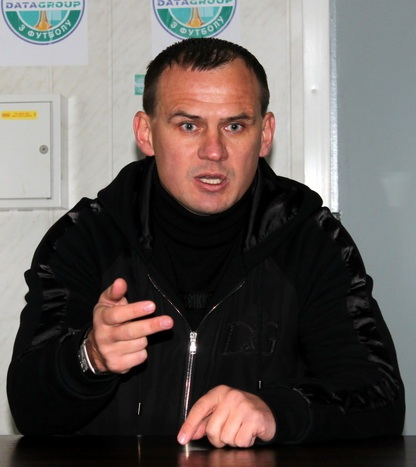

Personal information
- Full name: Vadym Hryhorovych Zayats
- Date of birth: 1 June 1974 (age 52)
- Place of birth: Chernivtsi, Ukrainian SSR
- Height: 1.82 m (5 ft 11 1/2 in)
- Position: Midfielder

Team information
- Current team: Bukovyna Chernivtsi (president)

Senior career*
Years	Team	Apps	(Gls)
1994–1998	Bukovyna Chernivtsi	125	(1)
1999–2000	Zirka-2 Kirovohrad	4	(0)
1999–2000	Zirka Kirovohrad	31	(1)
2000	Metalurh-2 Zaporizhzhia	5	(1)
2000–2001	Metalurh Zaporizhzhia	25	(2)
2002	Tavriya Simferopol	9	(0)
2002	Metalurh-2 Zaporizhzhia	1	(0)
2002–2004	Metalurh Zaporizhzhia	43	(1)
2005	Zakarpattia Uzhhorod	12	(0)
2007–2009	FC Luzhany	9	(1)
Total		264	(7)

Managerial career
- 2010: Bukovyna Chernivtsi (caretaker)
- 2010–2013: Bukovyna Chernivtsi
- * Club domestic league appearances and goals as of 10 October 2010

Vadym Zayats (Ukrainian: Вадим Григорович Заяць; born 1 June 1974) is a former Ukrainian professional football midfielder who played for different Ukrainian clubs in Ukrainian Premier League.

Until 31 August 2013 he was a manager in FC Bukovyna Chernivtsi in Ukrainian First League.
