= Sonyachny Stadium =

Stadium in Kharkiv Ukraine

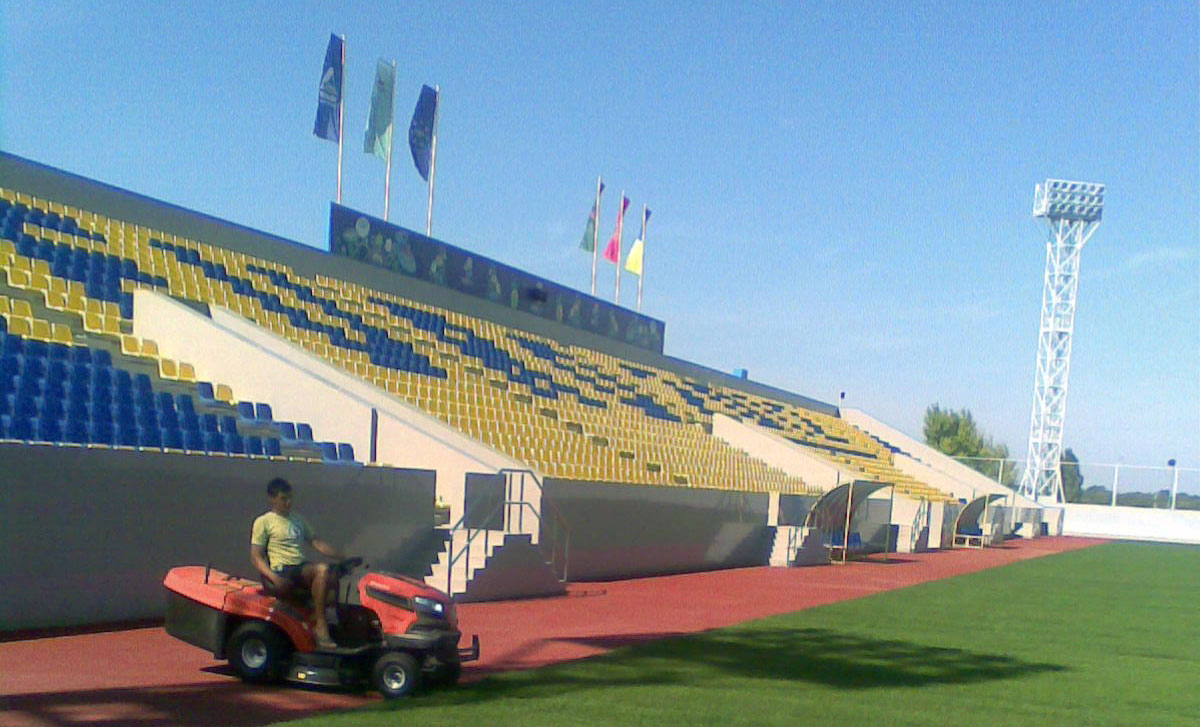

- Location within Kharkiv Oblast Location within Ukraine
- Location: Piatykhatky, Kharkiv, Ukraine
- Coordinates: 50.0978°N 36.2658°E
- Owner: Ukrainian Railways
- Capacity: 4,924
- Surface: Grass
- Field size: 105 m × 68 m (115 yd × 74 yd)

Construction
- Opened: September 7, 2011

Tenants
- FC Helios Kharkiv; FC Metalist 1925 Kharkiv

The Sonyachny Stadium is a football stadium in the city of Kharkiv, Ukraine. The stadium belongs to the local Children Healthcare Center "Sonyachny" which is a healthcare facility of the Ukrainian Railways (Southern Railway). The stadium is built on the northern outskirts of Kharkiv just beyond the administrative city limits.

The word "Sonyachny" means sunny in Ukrainian language and happened so that the first tenant of the stadium was the local FC Helios Kharkiv.

The stadium was built as a training center in 2011 as part of preparation to the Euro 2012. It was used by the Netherlands national football team for training purposes, which during the competition were based out of Kharkiv.

The stadium has a capacity of almost 5,000 spectators.

In 2012-2017 the stadium was the home ground of Ukrainian First League club FC Helios Kharkiv.

In 2017-2018 the stadium is the reserve home ground of FC Helios Kharkiv and FC Metalist 1925 Kharkiv.

On 21 May 2022 the stadium was severely damaged by a Russian shelling, which was a part of mass shelling of the northern side of Kharkiv including its residential Saltivka neighborhood.

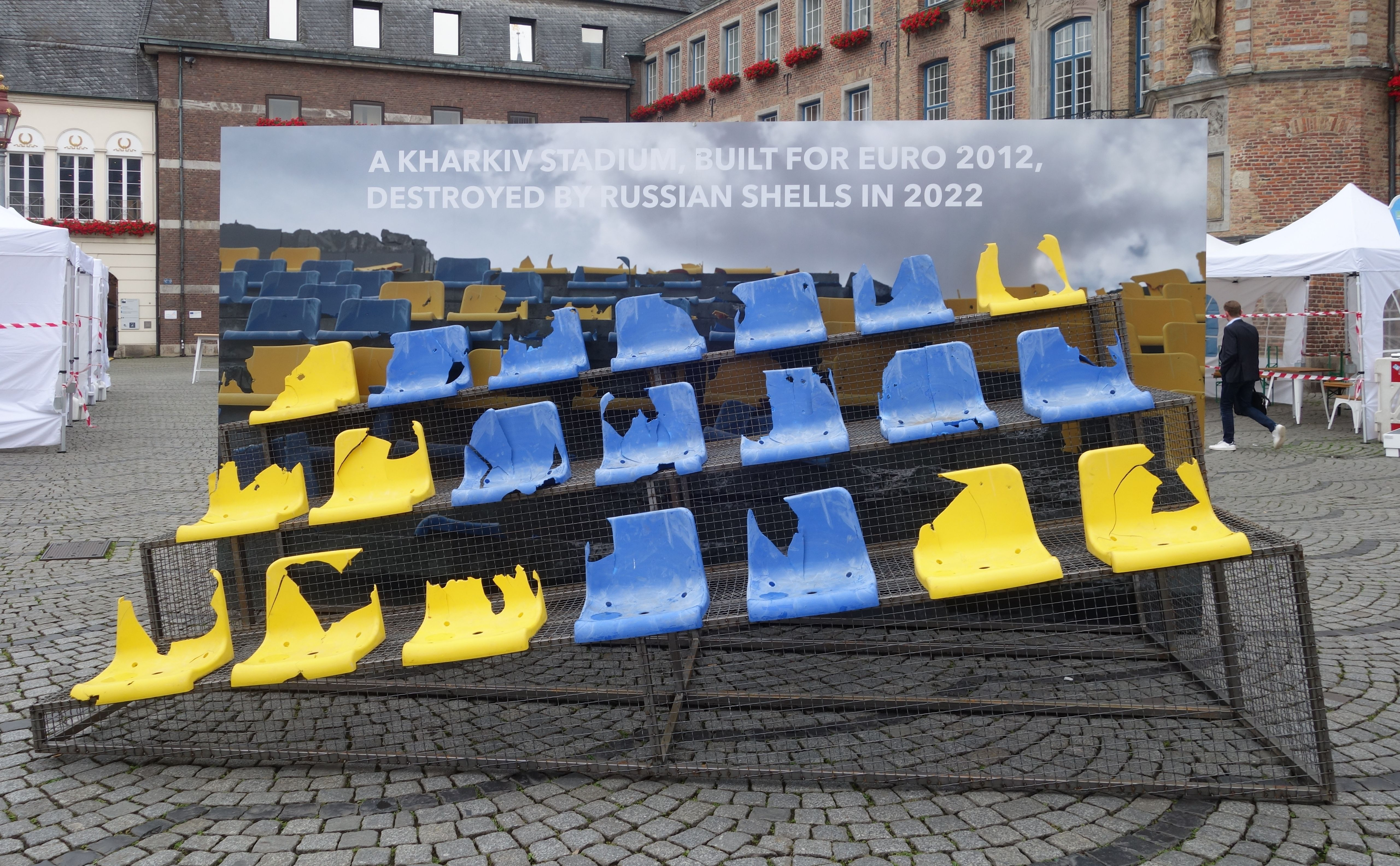
Description: 'Even if our stands are destroyed, we will never stop standing up – A Kharkiv stadium built for EURO 2012, destroyed by Russian shells in 2022.'. Ukrainian Association for Football. Displayed in Düsseldorf, during the European Championship 2024.
