= Holovkivka, Kirovohrad Oblast =

Rural locality in Kirovohrad Oblast, Ukraine

Holovkivka Головківка
- Village
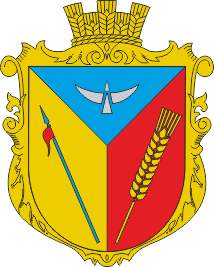
- Flag Coat of arms

- Location in Ukraine Holovkivka (Ukraine Kirovohrad Oblast)
- Coordinates: 48°34′N 33°04′E
- Country: Ukraine
- Oblast: Kirovohrad Oblast
- Raion: Oleksandriia Raion
- Hromada: Oleksandriia urban hromada
- Elevation: 86 m (282 ft)

Population (2001)
  - Total: 2,217
- Time zone: UTC+2 (EET)
  - Summer (DST): UTC+3 (EEST)
- Postal code: 28043
- Area code: +380 5235

Holovkivka (Ukrainian: Головківка) is a village in Oleksandriia Raion, Kirovohrad Oblast, Ukraine. The village has a population of 2,217. Holovkivka belongs to Oleksandriia urban hromada, one of the hromadas of Ukraine.
