= 2010–11 Ukrainian Cup =

Kubok Ukrainy

Tournament details
- Country: Ukraine
- Dates: 27 July 2010 – 25 May 2011; 27 July – 18 August 2010 (preliminary rounds); 21 September 2010 – 25 May 2011 (main event)
- Teams: 53

Final positions
- Champions: Shakhtar Donetsk (7th title)
- Runners-up: Dynamo Kyiv
- Semifinalists: Dnipro Dnipropetrovsk; Arsenal Kyiv

Tournament statistics
- Matches played: 51
- Goals scored: 139 (2.73 per match)
- Top goal scorer: 5 – Andriy Oliynyk (Karpaty Y.)

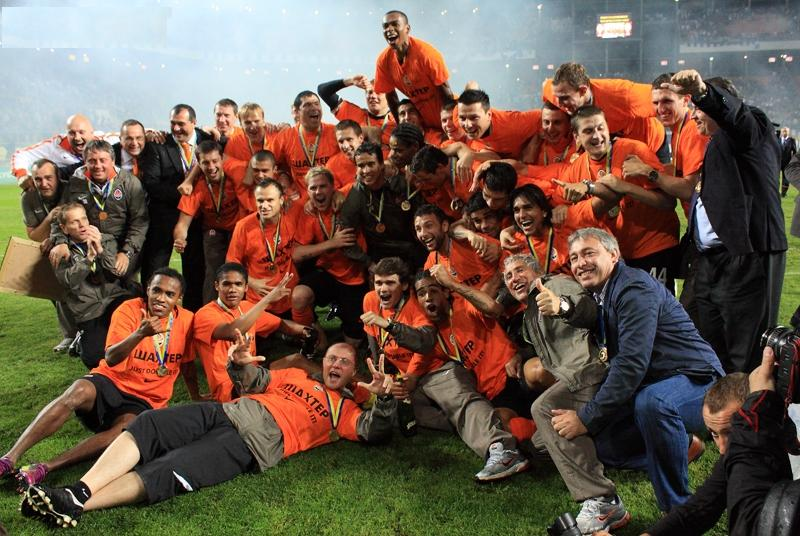
Shakhtar Donetsk, the 2011 Ukrainian Cup winners

The 2010–11 Ukrainian Cup was the 20th annual season of Ukraine's football knockout competition, and third under the name of DATAGROUP – Football Ukraine Cup.

The Cup begins with two preliminary rounds, before the first round proper involving the Premier League clubs. The draw for both the preliminary rounds was held on July 14, 2010. The First Preliminary Round consists of teams from Druha Liha and Amateur Cup champions and has only five fixtures. In the Second Preliminary Round teams of the Persha Liha enter the competition. Sixteen teams, winners of the 2nd preliminary round enter the first round or the round of 32 where the Premier League teams enter the competition for the first time.

Tavriya Simferopol was the defending champion and as a member of the Premier League enter the competition at the round of 32. Tavriya were eliminated in the round of 32 by Dnipro Dnipropetrovsk 1–4. This season's winner enters the play-off round of the UEFA Europa League 2011–12.

== Format ==
This season's format for the main event has changed again. The announcement of the format was given during the draw of the round 32 in the headquarters of the FFU. All matches consist of a single game and would include extra time and series of penalties if necessary to identify a winner. The broadcast of the draw was officially conducted for the first time by one of the sponsors of the Ukrainian Premier League (Footballua).

The draw was blind. All participants were ranked according to their table standings on September 8, 2010 and listed in that order for the draw. All seeds of pairs were numerated such as the first pair consisted of number 1 and number 2, the second pair of number 3 and number 4, the third – 5 and 6, and so on. Clubs of a lower league when seeded with one from a higher would receive a home advantage. However, in case for the same league seeded clubs, the hosting club was identified by an odd number that was drawn upon calling its name. A former Soviet player Vadym Yevtushenko was invited as a "special guest" to conduct the draw. For each announced club from the ranking list a ball with a number was drawn from a pot. According to the number, the announced club was placed into the seed with the corresponding number. The first club that was announced was FC Shakhtar Donetsk.

For the round of 16 draw, Viktor Leonenko was invited as the honorary visitor.

Fifty-eight teams entered the Ukrainian Cup competition.

=== Distribution ===
	Teams entering in this round	Teams advancing from previous round
First qualifying round (10 teams)	9 participants of the Second League (lower seeded); 1 participant of the Amateur Cup winner (Karpaty Yaremche)	
Second qualifying round (32 teams)	17 participants of the First League; 10 participants of the Second League (higher seeded)	5 winners from the first qualifying round
Tournament proper (32 teams)	16 participants of the Premier League	16 winners from the second qualifying round

=== Round and draw dates ===
All draws held at FFU headquarters (Building of Football) in Kyiv unless stated otherwise.

Phase	Round	Draw date	Game date
Qualifying	First qualifying round	14 July 2010	27–28 July 2010
Qualifying	Second qualifying round	14 July 2010	18 August 2010
Main event	Round of 32	8 September 2010	21–22 September 2010
Main event	Round of 16	1 October 2010	27 October 2010
Main event	Quarter-finals	28 October 2010	10 November 2010
Main event	Semi-finals	25 November 2010	11 May 2011
Main event	Final	25 May 2011 at Yuvileiny Stadium, Sumy	

=== Teams ===
Enter in First Round		Enter in Second Round		Enter in Round of 32
AAFU; 1 team	PFL League 2; 9/24 teams	PFL League 2; 10/24 teams	PFL League 1; 17/18 teams	UPL; 16/16 teams
Karpaty Yaremche	Desna Chernihiv; Enerhiya Nova Kakhovka*; Hirnyk Kryvyi Rih; Hirnyk-Sport Komsomolsk; Olkom Melitopol; Ros Bila Tserkva; Skala Morshyn; FC Sumy; Veres Rivne	Bastion Illichivsk; Dynamo Khmelnytskyi; Kremin Kremenchuk; MFC Mykolaiv; Nyva Ternopil; Olimpik Donetsk; FC Poltava; Shakhtar Sverdlovsk; Stal Dniprodzerzhynsk; Yednist Plysky	Arsenal Bila Tserkva; Bukovyna Chernivtsi; Chornomorets Odesa; Enerhetyk Burshtyn; Feniks-Illichovets Kalinino; Helios Kharkiv; Zakarpattia Uzhhorod; Krymteplytsia Molodizhne; FC Lviv; Naftovyk-Ukrnafta; Nyva Vinnytsia; Dnister Ovidiopol; FC Oleksandriya; Prykarpattya Ivano-Frankivsk; Stal Alchevsk; Tytan Armyansk; Zirka Kirovohrad	Arsenal Kyiv; Dnipro Dnipropetrovsk; Dynamo Kyiv; Illichivets Mariupol; Karpaty Lviv; Kryvbas Kryvyi Rih; Metalist Kharkiv; Metalurh Donetsk; Metalurh Zaporizhia; Obolon Kyiv; FC Sevastopol; Shakhtar Donetsk; Tavriya Simferopol; Volyn Lutsk; Vorskla Poltava; Zorya Luhansk

Notes:

- With the asterisk (*) are noted the Second League teams that were recently admitted to the league from amateurs and the AAFU (amateur) team(s) that qualified in place of the Amateur Cup finalist(s).
- Reserve teams from the Second League: Shakhtar-3, Chornomorets-2, Dnipro-2, Metalurh-2 (Zaporizhia), Illichivets-2; and Dynamo-2 from the First League were not included in the draw.

=== Bracket ===
The pairings for each round were not known from the incept.

Round 32
1L	Stal Alchevsk	3
1L	Arsenal Bila Tserkva	1
AM	Karpaty Yaremche	4
PL	Volyn Lutsk	5
1L	Tytan Armyansk	0
PL	PFC Sevastopol	3
1L	Krymteplytsia Molodizhne	0
PL	Dynamo Kyiv	1
2L	Hirnyk-Sport Komsomolsk	0
PL	Karpaty Lviv	5
1L	Chornomorets Odesa	1
PL	Vorskla Poltava (a.e.t.)	2
1L	PFC Oleksandria (p)	0 (5)
PL	Metalurh Donetsk	0 (3)
PL	Metalist Kharkiv	1
PL	Arsenal Kyiv	2
2L	FC Poltava (a.e.t.)	2
PL	Obolon Kyiv	1
PL	Shakhtar Donetsk	6
PL	Kryvbas Kryvyi Rih	0
2L	Stal Dniprodzerzhynsk	1 (5)
1L	Feniks-Illich. Kalinine (p)	1 (6)
PL	Metalurh Zaporizhya	1
PL	Illichivets Mariupol	0
2L	Yednist' Plysky	0
1L	Naftovyk-Ukrnafta	1
1L	Prykarpattya IF	0
PL	Zorya Luhansk	1
2L	Kremin Kremenchuk	1
2L	Shakhtar Sverdlovsk	0
PL	Dnipro Dnipropetrovsk	4
PL	Tavriya Simferopol	1

Round 16
1L	Stal Alchevsk	1
PL	Volyn Lutsk	0
PL	PFC Sevastopol	1
PL	Dynamo Kyiv	2
PL	Karpaty Lviv	3
PL	Vorskla Poltava	0
1L	PFC Oleksandria	1
PL	Arsenal Kyiv	2
2L	FC Poltava	0
PL	Shakhtar Donetsk	2
1L	Feniks-Illichivets Kalinine	1
PL	Metalurh Zaporizhya	2
1L	Naftovyk-Ukrnafta	0
PL	Zorya Luhansk	1
2L	Kremin Kremenchuk	0
PL	Dnipro Dnipropetrovsk	3

Quarterfinals
1L	Stal Alchevsk	2
PL	Dynamo Kyiv	3
PL	Karpaty Lviv	0
PL	Arsenal Kyiv	2
PL	Shakhtar Donetsk	1
PL	Metalurh Zaporizhya	0
PL	Zorya Luhansk	1 (4)
PL	Dnipro Dnipropetrovsk (p)	1 (5)

Semifinals
PL	Dynamo Kyiv	2
PL	Arsenal Kyiv	0
PL	Shakhtar Donetsk	2
PL	Dnipro Dnipropetrovsk	1

Final
PL	Dynamo Kyiv	0
PL	Shakhtar Donetsk	2

== Competition schedule ==
=== First Preliminary Round ===
In this round entered 8 clubs from the Druha Liha, the winner of the Ukrainian Amateur Cup, and the newly admitted club from Nova Kakhovka all seeded into five fixtures. The round matches are scheduled to be played July 28, 2010.

Desna Chernihiv (2L)	1 – 2	(2L) Enerhiya Nova Kakhovka
Ros Bila Tserkva (2L)	w/o^{(1)}	(2L) Hirnyk-Sport Komsomolsk
Karpaty Yaremche (AM)^{(2)}	3 – 0	(2L) Veres Rivne
Skala Morshyn (2L)	3 – 2^{(3)}	(2L) FC Sumy
Hirnyk Kryvyi Rih (2L)	1 – 1 aet, p. 6–7	(2L) Olkom Melitopol

Notes:

^(1) Match not played due to Ros Bila Tserkva's financial difficulties

^(3) The match was played on July 27, 2010

=== Second Preliminary Round ===
In this round entered all 17 clubs from Persha Liha (except Dynamo-2 Kyiv) and the higher seeded 10 clubs from the Druha Liha. They were drawn against the 5 winners of the First Preliminary Round. The round matches are scheduled were played August 18, 2010, unless otherwise noted.

18 August 2010	Karpaty Yaremche (AM)	1 – 0	(2L) MFK Mykolaiv	Yaremche, Ivano-Frankivsk Oblast
17:00 LST	Kavinskyi 23'	Report	Matkevych (penalty missed) 71	Stadium: Karpaty; Attendance: 1,500; Referee: Yuriy Suryak (Lviv)

Feniks-Illichivets Kalinine (1L)	4 – 3	(1L) Zirka Kirovohrad
Prykarpattia Ivano-Frankivsk (1L)	1 – 0	(1L) Enerhetyk Burshtyn
Dnister Ovidiopol (1L)	0 – 4	(1L) PFC Oleksandria
Dynamo Khmelnytsky (2L)	0 – 1	(1L) Chornomorets Odesa
Helios Kharkiv (1L)	0 – 1	(1L) Krymteplytsya Molodizhne
Naftovyk-Ukrnafta Okhtyrka (1L)	1 – 0	(1L) FC Lviv
Olkom Melitopol (2L)	1 – 2	(1L) Stal Alchevsk
Bastion Illichivsk (2L)	0 – 1	(2L) FC Poltava
Zakarpattia Uzhhorod (1L)	2 – 3	(1L) Tytan Armyansk
Olimpik Donetsk (2L)	1 – 3	(1L) Arsenal Bila Tserkva
Stal Dniprodzerzhynsk (2L)	1 – 0	(2L) Skala Morshyn
Kremin Kremenchuk (2L)	3 – 0	(2L) Nyva Ternopil
Enerhiya Nova Kakhovka (2L)	0 – 1	(2L) Yednist' Plysky
Hirnyk-Sport Komsomolsk (2L)	2 – 1 aet	(1L) Bukovyna Chernivtsi
Shakhtar Sverdlovsk (2L)	3 – 2	(1L) Nyva Vinnytsia

=== Round of 32 ===
In this round entered all 16 teams from the Premier League. They were drawn against the 16 winners from the previous round consisting of nine clubs from the First League, six clubs from the Second League, and one representative from the amateur league. The draw took place September 8, 2010.

21 September 2010	Karpaty Yaremche (AM)	4 – 5	(PL) Volyn Lutsk	Yaremche, Ivano-Frankivsk Oblast
16:00 LST	A. Oliynyk 19', 23', 84'; Kavinsky 33'	Report	Maicon 47', 52', 78'; Skoba 62', 76'	Stadium: Karpaty; Attendance: 3,000; Referee: Vitali Dyadenko (Kirovohrad)

22 September 2010	FC Kremin Kremenchuk (2L)	1 – 0	(2L) Shakhtar Sverdlovsk	Kremenchuk, Poltava Oblast
15:00 LST	Stepanchuk 46'	Report		Stadium: Politekhnik; Attendance: 2,200; Referee: Serhiy Skrypak

22 September 2010	FC Poltava (2L)	2 – 1 (a.e.t.)	(PL) Obolon Kyiv	Poltava
15:00 LST	Marchenko 52'; Kharchenko 93' (pen.)	Report	Kotenko 82'	Stadium: Lokomotyv; Attendance: 2,000; Referee: Oleksiy Lavriv

22 September 2010	Tytan Armyansk (1L)	0 – 3	(PL) PFC Sevastopol	Armyansk, AR Crimea
15:00 LST		Report	Neno 16'; Zhabokrytskyy 24'; Pleshakov 90+3'	Stadium: Khimik; Attendance: 1,350; Referee: Andriy Lisakovsky

22 September 2010	Yednist Plysky (2L)	0 – 1	(1L) Naftovyk-Ukrnafta Okhtyrka	Plysky, Chernihiv Oblast
16:00 LST		Report	Viter 73'	Stadium: Yednist; Attendance: 800; Referee: Andriy Hrysyo

22 September 2010	Hirnyk-Sport Komsomolsk (2L)	0 – 5	(PL) Karpaty Lviv	Komsomolsk, Poltava Oblast
16:00 LST		Report	Habovda 11', 67', 90+1'; H. Baranets 40'; Checher 56'	Stadium: Yunist; Attendance: 2,100; Referee: Oleksandr Ivanov

22 September 2010	Stal Alchevsk (1L)	3 – 1	(1L) Arsenal Bila Tserkva	Alchevsk, Luhansk Oblast
16:00 LST	Shevchenko 31', 90'; Odyntsov 56'	Report	Hordienko 37'	Stadium: Stal; Attendance: 2,500; Referee: Yaroslav Kozyk

22 September 2010	Stal Dniprodzerzhynsk (2L)	1 – 1 (a.e.t.) (5–6 p)	(1L) Feniks-Illichivets Kalinine	Dniprodzerzhynsk, Dnipropetrovsk Oblast
16:00 LST	Skarlosh 22'	Report	Shybko 52'	Stadium: Metalurh; Attendance: 2,500; Referee: Yuriy Foshchiy
	Penalties
	Obrevko (penalty missed); Leshko (penalty missed); Polunytskyi (penalty scored); Lomko (penalty scored); Peredystyi (penalty scored); Suspitsyn (penalty missed); Savchenko (penalty scored); Shutov (penalty missed); Apryshko (penalty scored)		(penalty scored) Artyomenko; (penalty missed) Lutsenko; (penalty missed) Bryl; (penalty scored) Kavatsiv; (penalty scored) Pavelko; (penalty scored) Shybko; (penalty scored) Leonov; (penalty scored) Ivashko; (penalty missed) Akchurin

22 September 2010	Prykarpattya Ivano-Frankivsk (1L)	0 – 1	(PL) Zorya Luhansk	Ivano-Frankivsk
17:00 LST		Report	Semenenko 37'	Stadium: Rukh; Attendance: 5,500; Referee: Andriy Kutakov

22 September 2010	Dnipro Dnipropetrovsk (PL)	4 – 1	(PL) Tavriya Simferopol	Dnipropetrovsk
18:00 LST	Seleznyov 25'; Homenyuk 33'; Kravchenko 47'; Hladkyy 88'	Report	Idahor 72' (pen.)	Stadium: Dnipro; Attendance: 10,127; Referee: Yuriy Mozharovsky

22 September 2010	Krymteplytsia Molodizhne (1L)	0 – 1	(PL) Dynamo Kyiv	Molodizhne, AR Crimea
18:00 LST		Report	Yussuf 90'	Stadium: Krymteplytsia; Attendance: 2,500; Referee: Andriy Yablonsky

22 September 2010	Chornomorets Odesa (1L)	1 – 2 (a.e.t.)	(PL) Vorskla Poltava	Odesa
18:00 LST	Didenko 4'	Report	Bezus 73'; Chesnakov 97'	Stadium: Spartak; Attendance: 4,000; Referee: Vitaliy Romanov

22 September 2010	Metalurh Zaporizhya (PL)	1 – 0	(PL) Illichivets Mariupol	Zaporizhia
18:00 LST	Tatanashvilli 60'	Report		Stadium: Slavutych Arena; Attendance: 2,500; Referee: Orest Shmyhelsky

22 September 2010	PFC Oleksandria (1L)	0 – 0 (a.e.t.) (5–3 p)	(PL) Metalurh Donetsk	Oleksandriya, Kirovohrad Oblast
18:30 LST		Report		Stadium: Nika; Attendance: 5,200; Referee: Anatoliy Zhabchenko
	Penalties
	Cherednichenko (penalty scored); Kazanyuk (penalty scored); Zaporozhan (penalty scored); Sydorenko (penalty scored); Kabanov (penalty scored)		(penalty scored) Mário Sérgio; (penalty missed) Hodin; (penalty scored) Morozyuk; (penalty scored) Dashyan

22 September 2010	Shakhtar Donetsk (PL)	6 – 0	(PL) Kryvbas Kryvyi Rih	Donetsk
19:00 LST	Moreno 12'; Mkhitaryan 35'; Luiz Adriano 65', 67', 89'; Eduardo 84'	Report		Stadium: Donbas Arena; Attendance: 23,808; Referee: Volodymyr Sirenko

22 September 2010	Metalist Kharkiv (PL)	1 – 2	(PL) Arsenal Kyiv	Kharkiv
20:00 LST	Shelayev 25'	Report	Samodin 62'; Matyukhin 76'	Stadium: Metalist; Attendance: 15,500; Referee: Yevhen Herenda

=== Round of 16 ===
In this round entered winners from the previous round. The Premier League is represented with 10 clubs, the First League – 4, and the Second League – 2. The draw for the round took place on October 1, 2010.

27 October 2010	FC Poltava (2L)	0–2	(PL) Shakhtar Donetsk	Poltava
14:00 LST		Report	Moreno 67'; Willian 72'	Stadium: Lokomotyv; Attendance: 2,500; Referee: Andriy Yablonsky

27 October 2010	Kremin Kremenchuk (2L)	0–3	(PL) Dnipro Dnipropetrovsk	Kremenchuk, Poltava Oblast
14:00 LST		Report	Kalynychenko 28'; O. Ferreyra 52'; Shakhov 90+4'	Stadium: Politekhnik; Attendance: 7,000; Referee: Artem Nozdarchiev

27 October 2010	Feniks-Illichivets Kalinine^{(4)} (1L)	1–2	(PL) Metalurh Zaporizhya	Kalinine, AR Crimea
14:00 LST	Riabtsev 43'	Report	Pisotskyi 32'; Sydorchuk 78'	Stadium: Yunist; Attendance: 150; Referee: Andriy Hrysyo

27 October 2010	Stal Alchevsk (1L)	1–0	(PL) Volyn Lutsk	Alchevsk, Luhansk Oblast
15:00 LST	Odyntsov 15'	Report		Stadium: Stal; Attendance: 3,000; Referee: Serhiy Berezka

27 October 2010	PFC Oleksandriya (1L)	1–2	(PL) Arsenal Kyiv	Oleksandriya, Kirovohrad Oblast
18:00 LST	Hrytsuk 33'; Cherednychenko 13' (o.g.)	Report	Samodin 63'	Stadium: Nika; Attendance: 3,800; Referee: Vitaliy Romanov

27 October 2010	Naftovyk-Ukrnafta Okhtyrka (1L)	0–1	(PL) Zorya Luhansk	Okhtyrka, Sumy Oblast
18:00 LST		Report	Fomin 74'	Stadium: Naftovyk; Attendance: 2,500; Referee: Anatoliy Zhabchenko

27 October 2010	PFC Sevastopol (PL)	1–2	(PL) Dynamo Kyiv	Simferopol
19:00 LST	Pleshakov 37'; Hololobov 45+1' (o.g.)	Report	Zozulya 69'; Ghioane (yellow card) 84' (yellow-red card) 87'	Stadium: Lokomotiv; Attendance: 1,000; Referee: Volodymyr Holovko

27 October 2010	Karpaty Lviv (PL)	3–0	(PL) Vorskla Poltava	Lviv
19:00 LST	Kuznetsov 54', 73'; Guruli 68'	Report		Stadium: Ukraina; Attendance: 7,000; Referee: Serhiy Lysenchuk

Notes:

^(4) Initially the management of Feniks-Illichivets Kalinine informed their opponents that the club has removed itself from further competitions. However, four days later the club informed the PFL that their financial state had stabilized and that they would play.

=== Quarter-finals ===
In this round entered winners from the previous round. The Premier League is represented with 7 clubs and the First League with 1 club. The draw for the round took place on October 28, 2010.

10 November 2010	Zorya Luhansk (PL)	1–1 (a.e.t.) (4 – 5 p)	(PL) Dnipro Dnipropetrovsk	Luhansk
13:00 LST	Polyanskiy 36'	Report	Cheberyachko (yellow card) 45' (yellow-red card) 71'; Hladkyy 75'	Stadium: Avanhard; Attendance: 17,000; Referee: Oleksandr Ivanov
	Penalties
	Polyanskiy (penalty scored); Kartushov (penalty scored); Chaykovskyi (penalty scored); Tesák (penalty scored); Bilyi (penalty missed)		(penalty scored) Ferreyra; (penalty scored) Rotan; (penalty scored) Seleznyov; (penalty scored) Konoplyanka; (penalty scored) Lobjanidze

10 November 2010	Stal Alchevsk (1L)	2–3	(PL) Dynamo Kyiv	Alchevsk, Luhansk Oblast
16:00 LST	Shevchenko 44'; Odyntsov 55' (o.g.); Loktionov 90+2'	Report	Milevskyi 49', 61'; Popov (yellow card) 25' (yellow-red card) 67'	Stadium: Stal; Attendance: 8,500; Referee: Vitaliy Romanov

10 November 2010	Karpaty Lviv (PL)	0–2	(PL) Arsenal Kyiv	Lviv
19:00 LST		Report	Samodin 8'; Gusev 82'	Stadium: Ukraina; Attendance: 27,000; Referee: Yaroslav Kozyk

10 November 2010	Shakhtar Donetsk (PL)	1–0	(PL) Metalurh Zaporizhya	Donetsk
19:00 LST		Report	Teikeu 14' (o.g.)	Stadium: Donbas Arena; Attendance: 22,326; Referee: Anatoliy Zhabchenko

=== Semi-finals ===
In this round, winners from the previous round were entered. The draw for the round took place on November 25, 2010.

11 May 2011	Shakhtar Donetsk (PL)	2–1	(PL) Dnipro Dnipropetrovsk	Donetsk
19:00 LST	Willian 15'; Teixeira 25'	Report	Hübschman 63' (o.g.); Seleznyov (yellow card) 22' (red card) 84'	Stadium: Donbas Arena; Attendance: 34,357; Referee: Oleksandr Derdo

11 May 2011	Dynamo Kyiv (PL)	2 – 0	(PL) Arsenal Kyiv	Kyiv
19:00 LST	Yarmolenko 10'; Shevchenko 51'	Report		Stadium: Dynamo imeni Lobanovskoho; Attendance: 10,000; Referee: Serhiy Boyko

=== Final ===
25 May 2011
20:15 EEST

Dynamo Kyiv	0–2	Shakhtar Donetsk
Betão (yellow card) 73' (yellow-red card) 86'	Report	Eduardo 64', (yellow card) 70' (yellow-red card) 77'; Luiz Adriano 87'

Yuvileiny Stadium, Sumy
Attendance: 27,800
Referee: Victor Svetsov (Odesa)

== Top goalscorers ==
Scorer	Goals	Team
(Ukraine) Andriy Oliynyk	5	Karpaty Yaremche
(Brazil) Luiz Adriano	4	Shakhtar Donetsk
(Russia) Sergei Samodin	3	Arsenal Kyiv
(Ukraine) Yuriy Habovda	3	Karpaty Lviv
(Brazil) Maicon	3	Volyn Lutsk
(Ukraine) Serhiy Stepanchuk	3	Kremin Kremenchuk
(Ukraine) Vyacheslav Shevchenko	3	Stal Alchevsk

== See also ==
- 2010-11 Ukrainian Premier League
- 2010-11 Ukrainian First League
- 2010–11 Ukrainian Second League
- UEFA Europa League 2010-11
