= 2004 Ukrainian Amateur Cup =

2004 Ukrainian Cup among amateurs
Tournament details
- Country: Ukraine

Final positions
- Champions: KZEZO Kakhovka
- Runners-up: Khimmash Korosten

The 2004 Ukrainian Amateur Cup was the ninth annual season of Ukraine's football knockout competition for amateur football teams. The competition started on 31 July 2004 and concluded on 2 October 2004.

The cup holders Yednist Plysky did not enter.

== Participated clubs ==
In bold are clubs that were active at the same season AAFU championship (parallel round-robin competition).

- Cherkasy Oblast: Nyva-Zlatokray Zolotonosha
- Chernihiv Oblast: Polissia Dobrianka
- Donetsk Oblast: Pivdenstal Yenakieve
- Ivano-Frankivsk Oblast: Teplovyk Ivano-Frankivsk
- Kharkiv Oblast: Pivdenkabel Kharkiv
- Kherson Oblast: **KZEZO Kakhovka**
- Kirovohrad Oblast: Zoria Hayvoron
- Luhansk Oblast: Shakhtar Sverdlovsk
- Lviv Oblast: Haray Zhovkva
- Rivne Oblast: **ODEK Orzhiv**
- Sumy Oblast: Shakhtar Konotop
- Zakarpattia Oblast: Avanhard Svaliava
- Zhytomyr Oblast: Khimmash Korosten

== Bracket ==
The following is the bracket that demonstrates the last four rounds of the Ukrainian Cup, including the final match. Numbers in parentheses next to the match score represent the results of a penalty shoot-out.

Round of 16
Teplovyk Ivano-Frankivsk	**5**	1	6
**Avanhard Svaliava**	2	**4**	**6**
Zoria Hayvoron	1	0	1
**Khimmash Korosten**	1	**7**	**8**
**Polissya Dobrianka**	**4**	0	**4**
Shakhtar Konotop	0	**2**	2
Nyva-Zlatokray Zolotonosha	1	2	3
**KZEZO Kakhovka**	**4**	**4**	**8**
Pivdenkabel Kharkiv	**1**	0	1
**Shakhtar Sverdlovsk**	0	**2**	**2**

Quarter-finals
Avanhard Svaliava	**3**	0	3
**Haray Zhovkva**	1	**3**	**4**
**Khimmash Korosten** (a)	1	2	**3**
ODEK Orzhiv	1	2	3
Polissya Dobrianka	0	0	0
**KZEZO Kakhovka**	**1**	**2**	**3**
Shakhtar Sverdlovsk	**1**	0	1
**Pivdenstal Yenakieve**	0	**2**	**2**

Semi-finals
Haray Zhovkva	**2**	0	2
**Khimmash Korosten**	1	**2**	**3**
Pivdenstal Yenakieve	0	1	1
**KZEZO Kakhovka**	**1**	1	**2**

Final
Khimmash Korosten	1	3	4
**KZEZO Kakhovka**	1	**5**	**6**

== Competition schedule ==
=== First round (1/8) ===
Team 1	Agg.	Team 2	1st leg	2nd leg
Teplovyk Ivano-Frankivsk	6 – 6 (a)	**Avanhard Svaliava**	5–2	1–4
Zoria Hayvoron	1 – 8	**Khimmash Korosten**	1–1	0–7
Pivdenkabel Kharkiv	1 – 2	**Shakhtar Sverdlovsk**	1–0	0–2
**Polissya Dobrianka**	4 – 2	Shakhtar Konotop	4–0	0–2
Nyva-Zlatokray Zolotonosha	3 – 8	**KZEZO Kakhovka**	1–4	2–4

=== Quarterfinals (1/4) ===
This year Haray Zhovkva, Pivdenstal Yenakieve, and ODEK Orzhiv received a bye to quarterfinals.

Team 1	Agg.	Team 2	1st leg	2nd leg
Avanhard Svaliava	3 – 4	**Haray Zhovkva**	3–1	0–3
**Khimmash Korosten**	3 – 3 (a)	ODEK Orzhiv	1–1	2–2
Shakhtar Sverdlovsk	1 – 2	**Pivdenstal Yenakieve**	1–0	0–2
Polissya Dobrianka	0 – 3	**KZEZO Kakhovka**	0–1	0–2

=== Semifinals (1/2) ===
Team 1	Agg.	Team 2	1st leg	2nd leg
Haray Zhovkva	2 – 3	**Khimmash Korosten**	2–1	0–2
Pivdenstal Yenakieve	1 – 2	**KZEZO Kakhovka**	0–1	1–1

=== Final ===
Team 1	Agg.	Team 2	1st leg	2nd leg
Khimmash Korosten	4 – 6	**KZEZO Kakhovka**	1–1	3–5

Winner of the 2004 Ukrainian Football Cup among amateur teams
**KZEZO Kakhovka (Kherson Oblast)**; **1st time**

== See also ==
- 2004 Ukrainian Football Amateur League
- 2004–05 Ukrainian Cup
