= Ukrainian Amateur Cup =

- Founded: 1996
- Region: Ukraine
- Qualifier for: Ukrainian Cup
- Current champions: Avanhard Lozova (1st title)
- Most championships: Pivdenstal Yenakieve; Chaika Borshchahivka; LNZ-Lebedyn (2 titles)
- Website: Official website
- 2026–27 Ukrainian Amateur Cup

The Ukrainian Football Cup for amateur teams (Ukrainian: Кубок України з футболу серед аматорських команд) or AAFU Cup (Ukrainian: Кубок ААФУ) is a national cup competition in Ukraine for amateur clubs.

The competition for amateur teams in cup format (knock-out format or Olympic system) was established in the 1996–97 season as part of the 1996 Ukrainian Cup reform. The reform limited winners of regional competitions from entering the main tournament, the Ukrainian Cup, but its better performers (winners and/or finalists) were granted a qualification spot for the next season.

Also, the creation of the competition was similar to establishing the Soviet Amateur Cup in 1957. The Ukrainian teams qualified for the tournament (Soviet Amateur Cup) through the Ukrainian Cup competition, which was completely downgraded in 1957 as one of 15 republican competitions of the Soviet Union (see Football Cup of the Ukrainian SSR).

Among the most notable clubs of the competition are LNZ-Lebedyn and AF Pyatykhatska, which eventually reached the Ukrainian top tier of the football league pyramid, the Ukrainian Premier League. Three clubs have managed to win the tournament twice. ODEK Orzhiv holds the record for the most seasons it has played.

== Format ==
The competition is an optional invitational tournament among teams that are delegated by selected regions (oblasts of Ukraine and autonomous republic of Crimea). Regions are not obligated to present their teams or fill their competition berths; there is no limitation on the number of teams from each region. All teams are applying for the competition once the AAFU provides its "registration window," and, if approved by the AAFU, then compete for the competition's trophy.

Traditionally, every play-off (match-up) round consists of two legs, including the final. The winner of the competition qualifies for the Ukrainian Cup. Most seasons consist of at least four rounds, usually starting with the Round of 16. Starting from the 2024-25 season, the final match consists of a single game.

An autumn-spring competition period was used until 1998–99, and since then, a spring-autumn system has been adopted over the calendar year. Since 2016, the competition once again follows the all-European season calendar, which lasts from autumn to spring.

In case of tie breakers, the competition followed the same recommendations set by UEFA and FIFA, including extra time, away goal rule, and penalty shoot-out, if needed. Starting from the 2024-25 season, the away goal rule practice was discontinued.

== Origins of the competition ==
The competition was introduced in 1996 during a big reform in Ukrainian football. This competition limited the participation of smaller clubs in the Ukrainian Cup competition. So, football clubs or teams that are outside of the national league structure and compete at regional competitions only would qualify for the Ukrainian Cup by winning this tournament.

The first season of the competition included 18 regional representatives out of 26 possible, with eight regions boycotting the competition. Two more teams withdrew from the competition following the draw. Nonetheless, at least four teams that previously competed in the 1995–96 Ukrainian Cup entered the new Ukrainian Amateur Cup competition. The first Ukrainian Amateur Cup final was played in the summer of 1997 with Domobudivnyk Chernihiv, which defeated Krystal Parkhomivka 3–1 on aggregate (results for the two-leg play-off were 1–1 and 2–0).

From March of 1998, the competition has been managed by the Ukrainian Football Amateur Association acting on behalf of the Ukrainian Football Federation. Since the 1998-99 season, the competition has undergone more changes due to difficulties involving some regions and their teams refusing to participate, and allowing other regions, which were willing to compete, to have more teams. In 1999, more changes took place when the competitions switched from their calendar from autumn-spring to spring-autumn, and winners, instead of qualifying to the Ukrainian Cup, would qualify to the UEFA Regions' Cup instead. Following the 2005 season, winners of the Ukrainian Amateur Cup were allowed to enter the Ukrainian Cup once again. After the 2010 season, both finalists or better participants, in case any finalists obtained professional status, received qualification to the Ukrainian main football cup competition.

== Finals ==
The club in bold is the winner.

Key
winning teams
teams that won both the Cup and the League (season's double)

Year	Venue	Finalist	Score	Finalist	Ukrainian Cup
2025–26	13 May 2026, Kyiv - Stadion imeni Bannikova, Attendance: 400	**Avanhard Lozova** (Kharkiv Oblast)	**2 - 0**	(Rivne Oblast) Mayak Sarny	Mayak Sarny (2); Olympiya Savyntsi (5); Ahrotekh Tyshkivka (2); Rokyta; Vilkhivtsi; To4ka Odesa
2024–25	7 May 2025, Kyiv - Stadion imeni Bannikova, Attendance:	**Ahrotekh Tyshkivka** (Kirovohrad Oblast)	**1 - 0**	(Rivne Oblast) Mayak Sarny	Ahrotekh Tyshkivka; Mayak Sarny; Denhoff Denykhivka; Kormil Yavoriv; Avanhard Lozova
2023–24	1 May 2024, Kyiv - Stadion Livyi Bereh training base, Attendance: 8 May 2024, Mykolaiv (Stryi Raion) - Stadion Miskyi, Attendance:	Shturm Ivankiv (Kyiv Oblast)	**2 - 2**; **1 - 1**	(Lviv Oblast) **FC Mykolaiv**	Mykolaiv (2); Olimpiya Savyntsi (4)
2022–23	24 May 2023, Myrhorod - Stadion Start, Attendance: 31 May 2023, Kaharlyk (Obukhiv Raion) - Stadion Kolos, Attendance:	Olimpiya Savyntsi (Poltava Oblast)	**0 - 1**; **1 - 1**	(Kyiv Oblast) **Druzhba Myrivka**	Olimpiya Savyntsi (3); Mykolaiv; Fazenda Chernivtsi; Shturm Ivankiv
2021–22	Competition was canceled at times of semi-finals due to the 2022 Russian invasion of Ukraine.				
2020–21	12 May 2021, Krutyi Bereh (Poltava) - Ltava Stadium, Attendance: 100 19 May 2021, Lebedyn (Shpola Raion) - LNZ Arena, Attendance: 160	Olimpiya Savyntsi (Poltava Oblast)	**0 - 4**; **0 - 2**	(Cherkasy Oblast) **LNZ-Lebedyn**	Olimpiya Savyntsi (2); Feniks Pidmonastyr
2019–20	22 July 2020, Poltava - Lokomotyv Stadium, Attendance: 0 29 July 2020, Mykolaivka (Bilopillia Raion) - Viktoriya Stadium, Attendance: 0	**Olimpiya Savyntsi** (Poltava Oblast)	**1 - 1**; **1 - 0**	(Sumy Oblast) Viktoriya Mykolaivka	Olimpiya Savyntsi; Viktoriya Mykolaivka (2)
2018-19	18 May 2019, Baryshivka - Prohres Stadium, Attendance: 550 8 June 2019, Vovchansk - Aggregate Factory Stadium, Attendance: 1,000	**Avanhard Bziv** (Kyiv Oblast)	**1 - 0**; **0 - 0**	(Kharkiv Oblast) FC Vovchansk	Avanhard Bziv; Vovchansk
2017-18	20 May 2018, Mykolaivka (Bilopillia Raion) - Viktoriya Stadium, Attendance: 500 10 June 2018, Lebedyn (Shpola Raion) - LNZ Arena, Attendance: 1,000	Viktoriya Mykolaivka (Sumy Oblast)	**0 - 3**; **2 - 0**	(Cherkasy Oblast) **LNZ-Lebedyn**	LNZ Lebedyn; Viktriya Mykolaivka
2016-17	18 June 2017, Petropavlivska-Borshchahivka (Kyiv-Sviatoshyn Raion) - Kozak-Arena, Attendance: 500 25 June 2017, Demnia (Mykolaiv Raion) - Kuziv Stadium, Attendance: 1,000	**Chaika Kyiv-Sviatoshyn Raion** (Kyiv Oblast)	**2 - 0**; **3 - 1**	(Lviv Oblast) Demnya	Demnya (2); Chaika Petropavlivska Borshchahivka (2)
2015	1 November 2015, Sosnivka (Chervonohrad) - Shkilnyi Stadium, Attendance: 1,500 8 November 2015, Zoria (Sarata Raion) - Tropanets Stadium, Attendance: 1,900	**Hirnyk Sosnivka** (Lviv Oblast)	**2 - 1**; **0 - 0**	(Odesa Oblast) Balkany Zoria	Ahrobiznes TSK Romny; Hirnyk Sosnivka
2014	2 November 2014, Petrove (Petrove Raion) - Inhulets Stadium, Attendance: 400 9 November 2014, Demnya (Mykolaiv Raion) - Kuziv Stadium, Attendance: 700	**AF Pyatykhatska Volodymyrivka** (Kirovohrad Oblast)	**1 - 0**; **2 - 1**	(Lviv Oblast) Demnya	Demnya; Balkany Zoria
2013	26 October 2013, Petropavlivska Borshchahivka (Kyiv-Sviatoshyn Raion) - Kozak-Arena (Sports School Stadium), Attendance: 300 2 November 2013, Plysky (Borzna Raion) - Yednist Stadium, Attendance: 1,000	**Chaika Kyiv-Sviatoshyn Raion** (Kyiv Oblast)	**3 - 0**; **2 - 3 (a.e.t.)**	(Chernihiv Oblast) Yednist Plysky	Yednist Plysky (2); Chaika Petropavlivska Borshchahivka
2012	28 October 2012 14:00 (LST), Mashivka - Kolos Stadium, Attendance: 500 4 November 2012 13:00 (LST), Orzhiv - ODEK Stadium, Attendance: 2,000	**Nove Zhyttia Andriyivka** (Poltava Oblast)	**1 - 1**; **2 - 1 (a.e.t.)**	(Rivne Oblast) ODEK Orzhiv	Nove Zhyttia Andriyivka; ODEK Orzhiv
2011	6 November 2011 13:00 (LST), Hvardiyske (Simferopol Raion) - Havardiyets Stadium, Attendance: 200 12 November 2011, Bucha - Yuvileinyi Stadium, Attendance: 500	Hvardiyets Hvardiyske (Autonomous Republic of Crimea)	**1 - 3**; **1 - 4**	(Kyiv Oblast) **FC Bucha**	Bucha; Hvardiyets Hvardiyske
2010	23 October 2010 15:00 (LST), Berehove - Druzhba Stadium, Attendance: 3,500 31 October 2010 13:00 (LST), Slov'yansk - Khimik Stadium, Attendance: 2,000	**Beregvideik Berehove** (Zakarpattia Oblast)	**2 - 0**; **2 - 2**	(Donetsk Oblast) Slobkhlib Slov'yansk	Beregvideik Berehove; Slobkhlib Sloviansk
2009	17 October 2009 15:00 (LST), Cherkasy - Central City Stadium, Attendance: 500 25 October 2009, Yaremche - Stadium "Karpaty", Attendance: 3,000	Khodak Cherkasy (Cherkasy Oblast)	**2 - 0**; **0 - 3**	(Ivano-Frankivsk Oblast) **Karpaty Yaremche**	Karpaty Yaremche
2008	2 November 2008 15:00 (LST), Kamyanka-Buzka - Nad Buhom Stadium, Attendance: 1,000 8 November 2008, Bucha - Yuvileyny Stadium, Attendance: 500	Halychyna Lviv (Lviv Oblast)	**0 - 0**; **1 - 3**	(Kyiv Oblast) **Irpin Horenychi**	Irpin Horenychi
2007	14 October 2007, Ochakiv - Artania Stadium, Attendance: 500 21 October 2007, Plysky - Yednist Stadium, Attendance: 500	Torpedo Mykolaiv (Mykolaiv Oblast)	**0 - 2**; **0 - 0**	(Chernihiv Oblast) **Yednist-2 Plysky**	Yednist-2 Plysky
2006	1 October 2006 16:00 (LST), Kamyanka-Buzka - Nad Buhom Stadium, Attendance: 1,000 8 October 2006 15:00 (LST), Chkalove (Nikopol Raion) - Kolos Stadium, Attendance: 400	**Karpaty Kamianka-Buzka** (Lviv Oblast)	**0 - 1**; **3 - 1**	(Dnipropetrovsk Oblast) Kolos Chkalove	Halychyna Lviv
2005	16 October 2005 15:00 (LST), Korosten - Spartak Stadium, Attendance: 3,000 22 October 2005 13:00 (LST), Yenakieve - Metalurh Stadium, Attendance: 1,000	Khimmash Korosten (Zhytomyr Oblast)	**1 - 4**; **1 - 1**	(Donetsk Oblast) **Pivdenstal Yenakieve**	Khimmash Korosten
2004	26 September 2004, Korosten - Lokomotyv Stadium, Attendance: 2,000 2 October 2004, Kakhovka - Olimpiysky Stadium, Attendance: 1,200	Khimmash Korosten (Zhytomyr Oblast)	**1 - 1**; **3 - 5**	(Kherson Oblast) **KZEZO Kakhovka**	
2003	12 October 2003, Rivne - Khimik Stadium, Attendance: 1,100; 19 October 2003 14:00 (LST), Plysky (Borzna Raion) - Yednist Stadium, Attendance: 3,000	ODEK Orzhiv (Rivne Oblast)	**0 - 0**; **0 - 2**	(Chernihiv Oblast) **Yednist Plysky**	
2002	29 September 2002, Zhytomyr - Central Stadium, Attendance: 1,000; 6 October 2002, Zhovkva - Roztochia Stadium, Attendance: 3,000	Rud Zhytomyr (Zhytomyr Oblast)	**0 - 1**; **2 - 4**	(Lviv Oblast) **Haray Zhovkva**	
2001	29 September 2001, Yenakieve - Metalurh Stadium, Attendance: 2,500; 6 October 2001, Perechyn - Perechyn Stadium, Attendance: 700	**Pivdenstal Yenakieve** (Donetsk Oblast)	**4 - 0**; **2 - 1**	(Zakarpattia Oblast) SC Perechyn	
2000	8 October 2000, Luzhany - Kolos Stadium, Attendance: 1,500; 15 October 2000, Parkhomivka - Kolos Stadium, Attendance: 1,500	**FC Luzhany** (Chernivtsi Oblast)	**5 - 1**; **4 - 4**	(Kharkiv Oblast) Krystal Parkhomivka	
1999	17 October 1999, Ukrainsk - Ukraina Stadium, Attendance: 5,000; 27 October 1999, Lutsk - Avanhard Stadium, Attendance: 180	**Shakhta Ukrayina Ukrainsk** (Donetsk Oblast)	**2 - 0**; **1 - 2**	(Volyn Oblast) Troyanda-Ekspres	
1998–99	13 June 1999, Varva - Yunist Stadium, Attendance: 2,000; 17 June 1999, Lutsk - Avanhard Stadium, Attendance: 400	**HPZ Varva** (Chernihiv Oblast)	**4 - 0**; **3 - 3**	(Volyn Oblast) Troyanda-Ekspres	
1997–98	24 May 1998, Zaporizhzhia - ZTZ Stadium, Attendance: 100; 30 May 1998, Khorostkiv - Kharchovyk Stadium, Attendance: 4,000	Dalis Kamyshuvakha (Zaporizhzhia Oblast)	**1 - 2**; **0 - 0**	(Ternopil Oblast) **Zoria Khorostkiv**	Zoria Khorostkiv
1996–97	1 June 1997, Chernihiv - Haharyn Stadium, Attendance: 400; 8 June 1997, Parkhomivka (Krasnokutsk Raion) - Kolos Stadium, Attendance: 6,200	**Domobudivnyk Chernihiv** (Chernihiv Oblast)	**1 - 1**; **2 - 0**	(Kharkiv Oblast) Krystal Parkhomivka	Domobudivnyk Chernihiv
1992	1992, ? - ?, Attendance:	**Hirnyk Pavlohrad** (Dnipropetrovsk Oblast)	**3 - 1**	(Volyn Oblast) Pidshypnyk Lutsk	

Notes:

- In 1992 there was conducted the Football Cup of the Ukrainian regions (oblasts) (Ukrainian: Кубок областей України).

=== Stadiums ===
List of stadiums with the biggest number of hosted finals

- 3 – Yednist Stadium, Plysky, Chernihiv Oblast
- 2 – Avanhard Stadium, Lutsk
- 2 – Kolos Stadium, Parkhomivka, Kharkiv Oblast
- 2 – Metalurh Stadium, Yenakieve, Donetsk Oblast
- 2 – Nad Buhom Stadium, Kamianka-Buzka, Lviv Oblast
- 2 – Stadion Yuvileinyi, Bucha, Kyiv Oblast
- 2 – Kozak Arena, Petropavlivska-Borshchahivka, Kyiv Oblast
- 2 – Kuziv Stadium, Demnia, Lviv Oblast
- 2 – Viktoriya Stadium, Mykolaivka, Sumy Oblast
- 2 – LNZ Arena, Lebedyn, Cherkasy Oblast

== List of finalists by regions ==
Region	Wins	Losses	Winning teams
Kyiv Oblast	6	1	Chaika Petropavlivska Borshchahivka (2), Irpin Horenychi, Bucha, Avanhard Bziv, Druzhba Myrivka
Lviv Oblast	4	3	Haray Zhovkva, Karpaty Kamianka-Buzka, Hirnyk Sosnivka, Mykolaiv
Chernihiv Oblast	4	1	Domobudivnyk Chernihiv, HPZ Varva, Yednist Plysky, Yednist-2 Plysky
Donetsk Oblast	3	1	Pivdenstal Yenakieve (2), Shakhta Ukrayina Ukrainsk
Poltava Oblast	2	2	Nove Zhyttia Andriyivka, Olimpiya Savyntsi
Cherkasy Oblast	2	1	LNZ-Lebedyn (2)
Kirovohrad Oblast	2	0	AF Pyatykhatska Volodymyrivka, Ahrotekh Tyshkivka
Kharkiv Oblast	1	3	Avanhard Lozova
Zakarpattia Oblast	1	1	Beregvideik Berehove
Ternopil Oblast	1	0	Zorya Khorostkiv
Chernivtsi Oblast	1	0	Luzhany
Kherson Oblast	1	0	KZEZO Kakhovka
Ivano-Frankivsk Oblast	1	0	Karpaty Yaremche
Rivne Oblast	0	4	
Zhytomyr Oblast	0	3	
Volyn Oblast	0	2	
Sumy Oblast	0	2	
Zaporizhia Oblast	0	1	
Dnipropetrovsk Oblast	0	1	
Mykolaiv Oblast	0	1	
Crimea	0	1	
Odesa Oblast	0	1	

== Regions and teams ==
=== 1997–2020 ===
Season	96/97	97/98	98/99	1999	2000	2001	2002	2003	2004	2005	2006	2007	2008	2009	2010	2011	2012	2013	2014	2015	16/17	17/18	18/19	19/20
Teams	18	20	25	13	15	14	14	15	13	19	15	18	21	22	24	22	19	27	23	32	27	40	40	28
AR Crimea							1	1		1					1	2	1							
Cherkasy		1			1	1	1	1	1	1	1	1	1	1		1	2	3	1	2		1	1	1
Chernihiv	1	1	1	1	2	1		1	1	2	2	2	2	2	1	1	1	2	1	1	3	2	3	~~1~~
Chernivtsi	1	1	1		1		1			1			1				1	1	1	2	1			
Dnipropetrovsk	1	1	1							1	1	2						1	2			3	3	2
Donetsk	1	1	1	1	1	1	1	3	1	1	1		1		1	1						3	2	3
Ivano-Frankivsk	1	1	1	1		1	1		1	1	1		1	1	1	1	1	1			1	2	3	1
Kharkiv	1	1	2	1	1	1			1			1		1	1	2		1	1		2		2	1
Kherson						1			1		1	2	1		2	2	1	1	1	2	1	5	3	1
Khmelnytskyi	1		1	1	1	1	1	1		1		1	1	1	1	1	1		1	2	1	1		
Kyiv	2	2	1	1	2	1	2	1		2	1		2	2	2	2	2	2	3	1	2	4	5	1
Kirovohrad	1	1	1		1				1			1	1	2	2	1	1	1	1	1	1		1	
Lviv	1	1	2	1	1		1	1	1	1	2	1	1	1	2	1		2	1	5	5	4	3	1
Luhansk			1	1	1			1	1				1	2	1	1						1	1	2
Mykolaiv	1	1	1									1	2	1	2	1	1	3	2	1	1			
Odesa	1		1	1						1		2	1	2		1	2	1	1	2				
Poltava			1	1		1	1						1		1	1	1	1		1		1	1	3
Rivne		1				1	1	1	1	1	1	1		1	1	1	1	3	3	3	2	3	3	2
Sumy	1	1	1	1		2	1		1	1								1		1	1	2	1	3
Ternopil	1	1	2	1							1	1	2	1	1					2	1	2	2	
Vinnytsia		1	1									1			1			1	1	3	3	3	2	1
Volyn	1	1	2	1	1			1			1		3	1				1					2	1
Zakarpattia	1	1	1		1	1	1	1	1	1	1		1	1	1			1				1	2	
Zaporizhzhia		1	1							1	1		1						1	1	1	2		1
Zhytomyr	1	1	1		1	1	1	2	1	2		1	2	2	2	2	2		2	2	1			3
Season	96/97	97/98	98/99	1999	2000	2001	2002	2003	2004	2005	2006	2007	2008	2009	2010	2011	2012	2013	2014	2015	16/17	17/18	18/19	19/20
Teams	18	20	25	13	15	14	14	15	13	19	15	18	21	22	24	22	18	27	23	32	27	40	40	28

=== 2020–present ===
Season	20/21	21/22	22/23	23/24	24/25	25/26	26/27
Teams	28	26	16	27	25	25	22
AR Crimea							
Cherkasy	1			1	1	1	
Chernihiv							
Chernivtsi			2			1	
Dnipropetrovsk	1	1	1	1	2	1	1
Donetsk		1					
Ivano-Frankivsk	1	2	1	2	2	1	
Kharkiv	2			2	1	1	
Kherson	1						
Khmelnytskyi			1			1	1
Kirovohrad		1	1	1	2	1	1
Kyiv	4	8	5	3	5	1	3
Luhansk	1	1					
Lviv	1	2	1	2	2	1	4
Mykolaiv						1	
Odesa	~~1~~			1		2	2
Poltava	1	1	1	2	4	5	3
Rivne	1	2			2	2	4
Sumy	5	~~1~~					
Ternopil			1	3		3	1
Vinnytsia		1					
Volyn	3	1		4	2	1	1
Zakarpattia	1	1		3	1	1	
Zaporizhzhia	1	2	1			1	
Zhytomyr	3	2	1	2	1		1
Season	20/21	21/22	22/23	23/24	24/25	25/26	26/27
Teams	28	26	16	27	25	25	22

== Participated teams by regions ==
Region	Teams
Sevastopol (0)	(none)
Crimea (6)	Krymteplytsia Molodizhne (2002), Akademia-X Kuibysheve (2003), Tavrika Simferopol (2005), Foros Yalta (2010), Hvardiiets Hvardiiske (2: 2011, 2012), Ahrokapital Suvorovske (2011)
Cherkasy Oblast (13)	KKhP Talne (1997/98), Kolos Chornobai (2000), Ikar Sobkivka (2001), Yatran Uman (2: 2002, 2003), [Nyva-]Zlatokrai Zolotonosha (3: 2004, 2005, 2023/24), Avanhard Monastyryshche (2006), Khodak Cherkasy (3: 2007–2009), Umanfermmash Uman (2011), Zoria Biloziria (4: 2012–2015), Retro Vatutine (3: 2012, 2013, 2015), Urahan Kryvonosivka (2013), LNZ-Lebedyn (4: 2017/18–2020/21), Karbon Cherkasy (2: 2024/25, 2025/26)
Chernihiv Oblast (14)	Domobudivnyk Chernihiv (1996/97), Cherksyl Chernihiv (1997/98), HPZ Varva (3: 1998/99–2000), Kolos Bobrovytsia (2000), Zirka Koriukivka (2001), **Yednist Plysky** (11: 2003, 2007–2011, 2013–2017/18), Polissia Dobrianka (4: 2004, 2005, 2008, 2009), Yevropa Pryluky (2005), Avanhard Koriukivka (5: 2006, 2016/17–2019/20), Nizhyn (2: 2006, 2007), LKT Chernihiv (2: 2012, 2013), Frunzivets Nizhyn (2016/17), Fortuna Komarivka (2018/19), FC Chernihiv (2018/19)
Chernivtsi Oblast (11)	FC Luzhany (4: 1996/97, 2000, 2005, 2008), Mytnyk Vadul-Siret (1997/98), Dnister Novodnistrovsk (1998/99), Kalynivskyi rynok Chernivtsi (2002), Pidhiria Storozhynets (2012), Mayak Velykyi Kuchuriv (2013), Zarinok Tysovets (2: 2014, 2015), FC Voloka (2: 2015, 2022/23), FSC Sloboda (2016/17), Fazenda Chernivtsi (2022/23), Dovbush Chernivtsi (2025/26)
Dnipropetrovsk Oblast (17)	Druzhba-Elevator Mahdalynivka (2: 1996/97, 1998/99), Ahrovest Novooleksandrivka (1997/98), Kolos Nikopol Raion (2: 2005, 2006), FC Nikopol (2007), Atlant Kryvyi Rih (2007), VPK-Ahro Shevchenkivka (4: 2013, 2014, 2017/18, 2018/19), Olimpik Petrykivka (2014), Hirnyk Kryvyi Rih (2017/18), FC Kryvyi Rih (2017/18), FC Dnipro (2018/19), Peremoha Dnipro (2: 2018/19, 2019/20), Skoruk Tomakivka (2019/20), FC Lozuvatka (2020/21), Lehioner Dnipro (2021/22), Penuel Kryvyi Rih (3: 2022/23–2024/25), OKKO (2024/25), Oril Tsarychanka (2: 2025/26, 2026/27)
Donetsk Oblast (14)	Silur-Trubnyk Khartsyzk (2: 1996/97, 1997/98), Shakhta Ukrayina Ukrainsk (2: 1998/99, 1999), Monolit Kostiantynivka (2000), Pivdenstal Yenakieve (5: 2001–2005), Shakhtar Dzerzhynsk (2003), Shakhtar Rodynske (2003), Illich-Ahro Mariupol (2006), Donbas-Krym Donetsk (2008), Slovkhlib Sloviansk (2: 2010, 2011), Sapfir Kramatorsk (3: 2017/18–2019/20), Forum-Avto Kramatorsk (2: 2017/18, 2018/19), Yarud Mariupol (2: 2017/18, 2019/20), FC Pokrovsk (2019/20), Portovyk Mariupol (2021/22)
Ivano-Frankivsk Oblast (21)	Probiy Horodenka (1996/97), Enerhetyk Burshtyn (1997/98), Beskyd Nadvirna (1998/99), Korona Ivano-Frankivsk (1999), Teplovyk Ivano-Frankivsk (4: 2001, 2004, 2005, 2011), Delta Hvizdets (2002), FC Tuzhyliv (2006), Tsementnyk Yamnytsia (2008), Karpaty Yaremche (2: 2009, 2012), Sniatyn-Yevromodul (2010), Hazovyk Bohorodchany (2013), Oskar Pidhiria (2016/17), Pokuttia Kolomyia (3: 2017/18, 2018/19, 2023/24), FC Kalush (2017/18), Naftovyk Dolyna (2018/19), Karpaty Halych (2: 2018/19, 2019/20), Karpaty Broshniv-Osada (2020/21), Harda Kalush (2021/22), Blaho-Yunist Verkhnia (3: 2021/22, 2023/24, 2024/25), Varatyk Kolomyia (2022/23), FC Vilkhivtsi (2: 2024/25, 2025/26)
Kharkiv Oblast (13)	Krystal Parkhomivka (4: 1996/97, 1998/99–2000), Enerhetyk Komsomolske (2: 1997/98, 2001), Arsenal Kharkiv (1998/99), Pivdenkabel Kharkiv (2004), Hazovyk Chervonyi Donets (2007), Lokomotyv Kupiansk (3: 2009–2011), Nika Kharkiv (2011), Kolos Zachepylivka (3: 2013, 2014, 2016/17), Kvadro Pervomaiskyi (2016/17), Univer-Dynamo Kharkiv (3: 2018/19–2020/21), FC Vovchansk (2: 2018/19, 2020/21), Avanhard Lozova (3: 2023/24–2025/26), Kolos Sakhnovshchyna (2023/24)
Kherson Oblast (9)	Tavriya Novotroitske (4: 2001, 2011, 2018/19, 2019/20), SC Kakhovka (5: 2004, 2008, 2015, 2017/18, 2020/21), Myr Hornostayivka (4: 2006, 2007, 2010, 2014), Sihma Kherson (2007), Krystal Kherson (2: 2010, 2017/18), Kolos Khlibodarivka/Askania-Nova (7: 2011–2013, 2015–2018/19), Druzhba Novomykolaivka (2017/18), Meliorator Kamianka (2017/18), Chornianka-Ahrosport (2018/19)
Khmelnytskyi Oblast (16)	Advis-Khutrovyk Khmelnytskyi (1996/97), Nyva-Tekstylnyk Dunaivtsi (1998/99), Dynamo-Orbita Kamianets-Podilskyi (1999), Tovtry Chemerivtsi (2000), Spoliyelast Slavuta (2001), Iskra Teofipol (2: 2002, 2022/23), SC Starokonstantyniv (2003), FC Khmelnytskyi (2005), Konfermat Khmelnytskyi (2007), Zbruch Volochysk (6: 2008, 2010–2012, 2014, 2015), Proskuriv Khmelnytskyi (2009), Hetman Khmelnytskyi (2015), Sluch Starokostiantyniv (2016/17), SC Khmelnytskyi (2017/18), Adrenalin-DYuSSh-1 Khmelnytskyi (2025/26), Kolos Polonne (2026/27)
Kirovohrad Oblast (12)	Burevisnyk Kirovohrad (1996/97), Lokomotyv Znamianka (1997/98), Herkules Novoukrainka (1998/99), Ikar-DLAU Kirovohrad (2: 2000, 2007), Zoria Haivoron (2004), Olimpik Kropyvnytskyi (4: 2008–2011), UkrAhroKom Holovkivka (3: 2009, 2010, 2018/19), Burevisnyk Petrove (2: 2012, 2013), Inhulets Petrove (2: 2014, 2015), Nova Politsia Kropyvnytskyi (2016/17), Zirka Kropyvnytskyi (4: 2021/22–2024/25), Ahrotekh Tyshkivka (3: 2024/25–2026/27),
Kyiv City (13)	Interkas (2: 1996/97, 1997/98), RFUVK/OKIP (2: 1997/98, 2021/22), Dnipro (3: 2000, 2001, 2003), Alians (3: 2002, 2005, 2006), Arsenal-Kyiv (2014), Yevrobis-Ahrobiznes (2014), Rubikon (3: 2017/18–2019/20), Atlet (3: 2018/19, 2021/22, 2024/25), AFSC (2020/21), UCSA (2: 2021/22, 2022/23), Lokomotyv (2022/23), Tytan (2: 2022/23, 2026/27), Rebel (2024/25)
Kyiv Oblast (24)	Refryzherator Fastiv (1996/97), Chaika Vyshhorod (2: 1998/99, 1999), Borysfen-2 Shchaslyve (2000), FC Brovary (2002), FC Putrivka (2: 2005, 2010), Irpin Horenychi (2008), Svitanok Kovalivka (2008), Liha Vyshneve (2: 2009, 2010), Zenit Boyarka (2: 2009, 2011), Bucha Fortuna {FC Bucha} (2: 2011, 2026/27), Dinaz Vyshhorod (2: 2012, 2013), Dynamo-Fastiv (2012), Chaika Petropavlivska Borshchahivka (3: 2013, 2016/17, 2017/18), Kolos Kovalivka (2014), FC Obukhiv (2015), Dzhuniors Shpytky (5: 2016/17–2018/19, 2020/21, 2021/22), DH Shevchenkivske Denykhivka (2: 2017/18, 2018/19), Avanhard Bziv (2018/19), Sokil Mykhailivka-Rubezhivka (6: 2020/21, 2021/22, 2023/24–2026/27), Nyva Buzova (2: 2020/21, 2021/22), [Ronin] Lisne (2: 2021/22, 2024/25), Druzhba Myrivka (2: 2021/22, 2022/23), Shturm Ivankiv (2: 2022/23, 2023/24), Denhoff Denykhivka (2: 2023/24, 2024/25)
Luhansk Oblast (10)	Ekina Almazna (2: 1998/99, 1999), Dynamo Stakhanov (2000), Inter Luhansk (2003), Shakhtar Sverdlovsk (2004), Khimik Severodonetsk (2008), Krasnodonvuhillia Krasnodon (2009), FC Popasna (3: 2009–2011), Zoria Rubizhne (2017/18), Skif Shulhynka (4: 2018/19–2021/22), Budivelnyk Lysychansk (2019/20)
Lviv Oblast (24)	Budivelnyk Pustomyty (1996/97), SC Truskavets (2: 1997/98, 1998/99), Dynamo Lviv (1998/99), Rochyn Sosnivka (5: 1999, 2015–2018/19), Sokil Zolochiv (2000), Harai Zhovkva (3: 2002–2004), Halychyna Drohobych (2005), Kniazha Dobromyl (2006), Halychyna Lviv (2: 2006, 2008), Rava Rava-Ruska (2007), Karpaty Kamianka-Buzka (2: 2009, 2010), FC Sambir (3: 2010, 2011, 2016/17), SCC Demnia (5: 2013–2017/18), Rukh Vynnyky (2: 2013, 2015), Opir Lviv (2015), FC Mykolaiv (7: 2015–2018/19, 2021/22, 2023/24, 2026/27), FC Lviv (2016/17), Yunist Verkhnia Bilka (3: 2017/18–2019/20), Feniks (Demnia)-Pidmonastyr (2020/21), FC Kulykiv (2021/22), Skala 1911 Stryi (2022/23), FC Pyatnychany (4: 2023/24–2026/27), Kormil Yavoriv (2: 2024/25, 2026/27), Mostyska (2026/27)
Mykolaiv Oblast (9)	Hidroliznyk Olshanske (1996/97), SC Pervomaisk (2: 1997/98, 1998/99), Torpedo Mykolaiv (5: 2007, 2008, 2012–2014), FC Voronivka (3: 2008–2010), Teplovyk Yuzhnoukrayinsk (2: 2010, 2011), MFC Pervomaisk (2: 2013, 2014), Varvarivka Mykolaiv (2013), FC Vradiivka (2: 2015, 2016/17), Mykolaiv 1920 (2025/26)
Odesa Oblast (15)	Monolit Illichivsk (1996/97), Dnister Ovidiopol (1998/99), Syhnal Odesa (1999), Ivan Odesa (2005), Bastion Illichivsk (2: 2007, 2009), Briz Izmail (3: 2007–2009), Savinyon Tayirove (2: 2011, 2012), FC Tarutyne (2012), Balkany Zoria (3: 2013–2015), Zhemchuzhyna Odesa (2015), Sehedka-Tarutyne (2020/21), Tytan Odesa (2023/24), To4ka Odesa (2: 2025/26, 2026/27), Enerhetyk Teplodar (2025/26), Real Pharma Odesa (2026/27)
Poltava Oblast (12)	[Sula] Lubny (2: 1998/99, 2025/26), Psel Hadiach (1999), ZemliaK Myrhorod (2: 2001, 2002), FC Velyka Bahachka (2008), Nove Zhyttia Andriivka (4: 2010–2013), **Olimpia Savyntsi** (11: 2015, 2017/18–2026/27), Lehion Poltava (2019/20), SC Poltava (2019/20), Standart Novi Sanzhary (3: 2023/24–2025/26), Kolos Velyki Sorochyntsi (2024/25), FC Rokyta (3: 2024/25–2026/27), Budivelnyk Kremenchuk (2: 2025/26, 2026/27)
Rivne Oblast (5)	Khimik Rivne (2: 1997/98, 2001), **ODEK Orzhiv** (19: 2002–2007, 2009–2021/22), FC Malynsk (3: 2013–2015), **Mayak Sarny** (10: 2013, 2015–2019/20, 2021/22, 2024/25–2026/27), Izotop-RAES Varash (3: 2014, 2017/18, 2018/19), Kostopil (3: 2024/25–2026/27), Novozhukiv (2026/27), Lehion Dubno (2026/27)
Sumy Oblast (11)	Slovianets Konotop (1996/97), Kharchovyk Popivka (2: 1997/98, 1998/99), Naftovyk-2/Naftovyk (4: 1999, 2001, 2005, 2020/21), Yavir Krasnopillia (2001), Shakhtar Konotop (2: 2002, 2004), Barsa Sumy (2013), Ahrobiznes-TSK Romny (2: 2015, 2017/18), Viktoriya Mykolayivka (5: 2016/17–2020/21), Veleten Hlukhiv (3: 2019/20–2021/22), LS Group/Sumy (2: 2019/20, 2020/21), Kolos Severynivka (2020/21)
Ternopil Oblast (17)	Nyva Terebovlia (4: 1996/97, 1998/99, 2015, 2017/18), Zorya Khorostkiv (1997/98), Lysonia Berezhany (1998/99), Sokil-Orion Velyki Hayi (1999), Brovar Mykulyntsi (2006), Halych Zbarazh (4: 2007, 2008, 2023/24, 2025/26), Lan Velyka Berezovytsia (2008), Tovtry Kozliv (2009), Marspyrt Nahiryanka (2010), Ahro Synkiv (2015), DSO-Podillya Ternopil Raion (3: 2016/17–2018/19), Zbruch-Ahrobiznes Pidvolochysk (2018/19), Ahron Velyki Hayi (2022/23), Dnister Zalishchyky (2: 2023/24, 2025/26), Medobory Zelene (2023/24), Borshchiv (2025/26), Buchach (2026/27)
Vinnytsia Oblast (12)	Horyzont Koziatyn (1997/98), Kirovets Mohyliv-Podilskyi (1998/99), Laris Kalynivka (2007), FC Sharhorod (2010), FC Vinnytsia (3: 2013–2015), 15 Hromada Rudanske (2015), Patriot Kukavka (2: 2015, 2016/17), Fakel Lypovets (3: 2016/17–2018/19), FC Bershad (2016/17), Ahro-Astra Nemyriv Raion (2017/18), Svitanok-Ahrosvit Shliakhova (3: 2017/18–2019/20), YaSKO Sharhorod (2021/22)
Volyn Oblast (14)	Dynamo Manevychi (1996/97), Yavir Tsuman (3: 1997/98, 1998/99, 2000), Troyanda-Ekspres Hirka Polonka (2: 1998/99, 1999), Prylad-LDPU Lutsk (2003), Votrans Lutsk (5: 2006, 2008, 2018/19–2020/21), FC Marianivka (2008), BRW-WIK Volodymyr-Volynskyi (2008), Shakhtar Novovolynsk (2009), Laska Boratyn (2013), LSTM 536 Lutsk (6: 2018/19, 2020/21, 2021/22, 2023/24–2025/26), Kovel-Volyn (2: 2020/21, 2023/24), FC Volodymyr (2023/24), FC Trostianets (2: 2023/24, 2024/25), Dukhche (2026/27)
Zakarpattia Oblast (16)	Vyzhybu/Beregvidek (2: 1996/97, 2010), Lisnyk Perechyn (3: 1997/98, 2000, 2001), Palanok Mukacheve (1998/99), FC Mukacheve (2: 2002, 2008), Zdorovia Uzhhorod (2003), Avanhard Svaliava (2: 2004, 2005), FC Badalove (2006), FC Poliana (2009), Petrovo Tiszapéterfalva (2013), Sevlyush Vynohradiv (3: 2017/18, 2018/19, 2024/25), SC Vilkhivtsi (2: 2018/19, 2023/24), MFA Mukacheve (2020/21), FC Khust (2021/22), Maramuresh Nyzhnia Apsha (2023/24), SKhI Uzhhorod (2023/24), Medeya-Nevytskyi Zamok Onykivtsi (2025/26)
Zaporizhzhia Oblast (8)	Dalis Komyshuvakha (1997/98), ZAlK Zaporizhzhia (2: 1998/99, 2005), FC Berdiansk (2006), Illich Osypenko (2008), Tavriya-Skif Rozdol (5: 2014–2017/18, 2019/20), Metalurh/Metalurh-2 (3: 2017/18, 2020/21, 2021/22), Motor Zaporizhzhia (2: 2021/22, 2022/23), Iron Zaporizhia (2025/26)
Zhytomyr Oblast (15)	Zviahel-93/Zviahel (5: 1996/97, 1997/98, 2019/20–2021/22), KKhP Cherniakhiv (2: 1998/99, 2001), FC Berdychiv (2: 2000, 2023/24), Rud Zhytomyr (2002), Korosten (4: 2003, 2005, 2014, 2015), Khimmash Korosten (4: 2003–2005, 2009), Metalurh Malyn (2: 2007, 2008), Arsenal Skrahlivka (2008), Zoria-Enerhiya Romaniv (2: 2010, 2012), Lehion Zhytomyr (2011), Zviahel-750/Avanhard Novohrad-Volynsky (5: 2009–2012, 2014), Mal Korosten (3: 2015, 2019/20, 2020/21), MFC Zhytomyr (2016/17), Polissia Stavky (5: 2019/20–2023/24), Korosten/Ahro-Nyva {Ahro-Nyva Narodychi/Lasky} (2: 2024/25, 2026/27)

- Underlined are current teams in the region with the most seasons played.
- In **bold** are teams that played at least 10 seasons in the competition.

=== Teams with most seasons ===
- 19 – ODEK Orzhiv (Rivne Oblast)
- 11 – Olimpiya Savyntsi (Poltava Oblast)
- 11 – Yednist Plysky (Chernihiv Oblast)
- 10 – Mayak Sarny (Rivne Oblast)
- 7 – FC Mykolaiv (Lviv Oblast)
- 7 – Kolos Khlibodarivka/Askania-Nova (Kherson Oblast)
- 6 – Zbruch Volochysk (Khmelnytskyi Oblast)

== See also ==
- Ukrainian football championship among amateurs
- Soviet Amateur Cup
- Football Cup of the Ukrainian SSR
