= 2005 Ukrainian Amateur Cup =

2005 Ukrainian Cup among amateurs
Tournament details
- Country: Ukraine

Final positions
- Champions: Pivdenstal Yenakieve
- Runners-up: Khimmash Korosten

The 2005 Ukrainian Amateur Cup was the tenth annual season of Ukraine's football knockout competition for amateur football teams. The competition started on 24 July 2005 and concluded on 22 October 2005.

The cup holders KZEZO Kakhovka did not enter.

== Participated clubs ==
In bold are clubs that were active at the same season AAFU championship (parallel round-robin competition).

- Autonomous Republic of Crimea: Tavrika Simferopol
- Chernivtsi Oblast: Zolotokray Zolotonosha Raion
- Chernihiv Oblast (2): Polissya Dobrianka, **Yevropa Pryluky**
- Chernivtsi Oblast: FC Luzhany
- Dnipropetrovsk Oblast: Kolos Nikopol Raion
- Donetsk Oblast: Pivdenstal Yenakieve
- Ivano-Frankivsk Oblast: Teplovyk Ivano-Frankivsk
- Khmelnytskyi Oblast: FC Khmelnytskyi
- Kyiv Oblast: FC Putrivka
- Kyiv: Alyans
- Lviv Oblast: Halychyna Drohobych
- Odesa Oblast: **Ivan Odesa**
- Rivne Oblast: **ODEK Orzhiv**
- Sumy Oblast: Naftovyk-2 Okhtyrka
- Zaporizhia Oblast: **ZAlK Zaporizhia**
- Zhytomyr Oblast (2): Khimmash Korosten, FC Korosten
- Zakarpattia Oblast: Avanhard Svaliava

== Bracket ==
The following is the bracket that demonstrates the last four rounds of the Ukrainian Cup, including the final match. Numbers in parentheses next to the match score represent the results of a penalty shoot-out.

Round of 16
Avanhard Svaliava	0	1	1
**Halychyna Drohobych**	**1**	1	**2**
FC Khmelnytskyi	2	1	3
**FC Luzhany**	**6**	**9**	**15**
FC Korosten	-
**ODEK Orzhiv**	+
**Khimmash Korosten**	**1**	1	**2**
FC Putrivka	0	1	1
Polissya Dobrianka	**2**	1	3
**Alyans Kyiv**	1	**3**	**4**
Zolotokray Zolotonosha Raion	2	-	-
**Ivan Odesa**	**3**	+	+
ZAlK Zaporizhia	**4**	0	4
**Pivdenstal Yenakieve**	1	**4**	**5**
Tavrika Simferopol	0	2	2
**Kolos Nikopol Raion**	**2**	2	**4**

Quarter-finals
Halychyna Drohobych	1	0	1
**FC Luzhany**	1	**3**	**4**
ODEK Orzhiv	1	1	2
**Khimmash Korosten**	**3**	**3**	**6**
Alyans Kyiv	0	0	0
**Ivan Odesa**	**2**	**4**	**6**
**Pivdenstal Yenakieve** (a)	0	2	**2**
Kolos Nikopol Raion	0	2	2

Semi-finals
FC Luzhany	**1**	1	2
**Khimmash Korosten**	0	**4**	**4**
Ivan Odesa	0	-	-
**Pivdenstal Yenakieve**	**2**	+	+

Final
Khimmash Korosten	1	1	2
**Pivdenstal Yenakieve**	**4**	1	**5**

== Competition schedule ==
This year, the cup started from the 1/8th finals, to which six teams had to qualify through the preliminary round.

=== First round ===
Team 1	Agg.	Team 2	1st leg	2nd leg
Teplovyk Ivano-Frankivsk	1 – 4	**Avanhard Svaliava**	0–0	1–4
**Khimmash Korosten**	1 – 0	Yevropa Pryliuky	1–0	0–0
Naftovyk-2 Okhtyrka	3 – 5	**Polissya Dobrianka**	3–2	0–3

=== Second round (1/8) ===
Team 1	Agg.	Team 2	1st leg	2nd leg
Avanhard Svaliava	1 – 2	**Halychyna Drohobych**	0–1	1–1
FC Khmelnytskyi	3 – 15	**FC Luzhany**	2–6	1–9
FC Korosten	w/o	**ODEK Orzhiv**	-:+	-:+
**Khimmash Korosten**	2 – 1	FC Putrivka	1–0	1–1
Polissya Dobrianka	3 – 4	**Alyans Kyiv**	2–1	1–3
Zolotokray Zolotonosha Raion	w/o	**Ivan Odesa**	2–3	-:+
ZAlK Zaporizhia	4 – 5	**Pivdenstal Yenakieve**	4–1	0–4
Tavrika Simferopol	2 – 4	**Kolos Nikopol Raion**	0–2	2–2

=== Quarterfinals (1/4) ===
Team 1	Agg.	Team 2	1st leg	2nd leg
Halychyna Drohobych	1 – 4	**FC Luzhany**	1–1	0–3
ODEK Orzhiv	2 – 6	**Khimmash Korosten**	1–3	1–3
Alyans Kyiv	0 – 6	**Ivan Odesa**	0–2	0–4
**Pivdenstal Yenakieve**	2 – 2 (a)	Kolos Nikopol Raion	0–0	2–2

=== Semifinals (1/2) ===
Team 1	Agg.	Team 2	1st leg	2nd leg
FC Luzhany	2 – 4	**Khimmash Korosten**	1–0	1–4
Ivan Odesa	w/o	**Pivdenstal Yenakieve**	0–2	-:+

=== Final ===
Team 1	Agg.	Team 2	1st leg	2nd leg
Khimmash Korosten	2 – 5	**Pivdenstal Yenakieve**	1–4	1–1

Winner of the 2005 Ukrainian Football Cup among amateur teams
**Pivdenstal Yenakieve (Donetsk Oblast)**; **2nd time**

== See also ==
- 2005 Ukrainian Football Amateur League
- 2005–06 Ukrainian Cup
