= Andriy Oliynyk (footballer, born 1983) =

Ukrainian footballer

Personal information
- Full name: Andriy Petrovych Oliynyk
- Date of birth: 5 August 1983 (age 43)
- Height: 1.75 m (5 ft 9 in)
- Position: Striker

Senior career*
Years	Team	Apps	(Gls)
2002–2003	FC Luzhany	3	(1)
2003–2007	Spartak Ivano-Frankivsk	28	(1)
2003–2004	→ FC Spartak-2 Kalush (loan)	17	(1)
2007–2008	FC Naftovyk Dolyna	2	(0)
2009	FC Luzhany	3	(0)
2011	FC Hvizdets	6	(3)
2011–2012	FC Prykarpattia Ivano-Frankivsk	15	(5)
2012	FC Karpaty Yaremche	34	(25)
2013	FC Hutsulshchyna Kosiv	11	(3)
2013–?	FC Karpaty Yaremche	27	(8)
- * Club domestic league appearances and goals

Andriy Petrovych Oliynyk (Ukrainian: Андрій Петрович Олійник, born 5 August 1983) is a Ukrainian former professional footballer played as striker. He became a top scorer of the 2010-11 Ukrainian Cup.
