= 2002 Ukrainian Amateur Cup =

2002 Ukrainian Cup among amateurs
Tournament details
- Country: Ukraine
- Dates: 14 July – 6 October 2002
- Teams: 14

Final positions
- Champions: Haray Zhovkva
- Runners-up: Rud Zhytomyr
- Ukrainian Cup qualifiers: none

The 2002 Ukrainian Amateur Cup was the seventh annual season of Ukraine's football knockout competition for amateur football teams. The competition started on 14 July 2002 and concluded on 6 October 2002.

The cup holders, Pivdenstal Yenakieve, were defeated at the quarterfinals by Alyans Kyiv. The final match, between Rub Zhytomyr and FC Haray Zhovkva, ended with Haray winning the cup.

== Participated clubs ==
In bold are clubs that were active at the same season AAFU championship (parallel round-robin competition).

- Autonomous Republic of Crimea: Krymteplytsia Molodizhne
- Cherkasy Oblast: Yatran Uman
- Chernivtsi Oblast: Kalynivskyi rynok Chernivtsi
- Donetsk Oblast: **Pivdenstal Yenakieve**
- Ivano-Frankivsk Oblast: Delta Hvizdets
- Khmelnytskyi Oblast: Iskra Teofipol
- Kyiv: Alyans
- Kyiv Oblast: FC Brovary
- Lviv Oblast: Haray Zhovkva
- Poltava Oblast: ZemliaK Myrhorod
- Rivne Oblast: ODEK-Ukraina Orzhiv
- Sumy Oblast: Shakhtar Konotop
- Zakarpattia Oblast: FC Mukacheve
- Zhytomyr Oblast: Rud Zhytomyr

== Bracket ==
The following is the bracket that demonstrates the last four rounds of the Ukrainian Cup, including the final match. Numbers in parentheses next to the match score represent the results of a penalty shoot-out.

Round of 16
**ODEK-Ukraina Orzhiv'**	+	1	+
Iskra Teofipol	-	1	-
**Delta Hvizdets**	**3**	1	**4**
Kalynivskyi rynok Chernivtsi	0	1	1
FC Brovary	0	0	0
**Rud Zhytomyr**	**4**	**8**	**12**
**ZemliaK Myrhorod**	+	0	+
Yatran Uman	-	0	-
**Alyans Kyiv**	**2**	1	**3 (6)**
Shakhtar Konotop	1	**2**	3 (5)
**Pivdenstal Yenakieve**	0	**2**	**2**
Krymteplytsia Molodizhne	0	0	0

Quarter-finals
ODEK-Ukraina Orzhiv	0	1	1
**Haray Zhovkva**	**1**	**3**	**4**
**Delta Hvizdets**	+	**2**	+
FC Mukacheve	-	1	-
**Rud Zhytomyr**	**1**	**2**	**3**
ZemliaK Myrhorod	0	1	1
**Alyans Kyiv** (a)	**2**	1	**3**
Pivdenstal Yenakieve	0	**3**	3

Semi-finals
**Haray Zhovkva**	**4**	0	**4**
Delta Hvizdets	1	**1**	2
**Rud Zhytomyr**	**1**	2	**3**
Alyans Kyiv	0	2	2

Final
**Haray Zhovkva**	**4**	**1**	**5**
Rud Zhytomyr	2	0	2

== Competition schedule ==
=== First round (1/8) ===
Team 1	Agg.	Team 2	1st leg	2nd leg
**ODEK-Ukraina Orzhiv**	w/o	Iskra Teofipol	+:-	1–1
**Delta Hvizdets**	4 – 1	Kalynivskyi rynok Chernivtsi	3–0	1–1
FC Brovary	0 – 12	**Rud Zhytomyr**	0–4	0–8
**ZemliaK Myrhorod**	w/o	Yatran Uman	+:-	0–0
**Alyans Kyiv**	3 – 3 (6–5 p)	Shakhtar Konotop	2–1	1–2 (a.e.t.)
**Pivdenstal Yenakieve**	2 – 0	Krymteplytsia Molodizhne	0–0	2–0

=== Quarterfinals (1/4) ===
Some teams, Haray Zhovkva and Mukacheve, started at quarterfinals.

Team 1	Agg.	Team 2	1st leg	2nd leg
ODEK-Ukraina Orzhiv	1 – 4	**Haray Zhovkva**	0–1	1–3
**Delta Hvizdets**	w/o	FC Mukacheve	+:-	2–1
**Rud Zhytomyr**	3 – 1	ZemliaK Myrhorod	1–0	2–1
**Alyans Kyiv**	3 – 3 (a)	Pivdenstal Yenakieve	2–0	1–3

=== Semifinals (1/2) ===
Team 1	Agg.	Team 2	1st leg	2nd leg
**Haray Zhovkva**	4 – 2	Delta Hvizdets	4–1	0–1
**Rud Zhytomyr**	3 – 2	Alyans Kyiv	1–0	2–2

=== Final ===
Team 1	Agg.	Team 2	1st leg	2nd leg
**Haray Zhovkva**	5 – 2	Rud Zhytomyr	4–2	1–0

Winner of the 2002 Ukrainian Football Cup among amateur teams
**Haray Zhovkva (Lviv Oblast)**; **1st time**

== See also ==
- 2002 Ukrainian Football Amateur League
- 2002–03 Ukrainian Cup
