= 2008 Ukrainian Amateur Cup =

2008 Ukrainian Cup among amateurs
Tournament details
- Country: Ukraine
- Teams: 26

Final positions
- Champions: Irpin Horenychi
- Runners-up: Halychyna Lviv

The 2008 Ukrainian Amateur Cup was the thirteenth annual season of Ukraine's football knockout competition for amateur football teams. The competition started on 6 August 2008 and concluded on 8 November 2008.

The cup holders FC Yednist-2 Plysky were defeated by FC Irpin Horenychi at quarterfinals.

== Participated clubs ==
In bold are clubs that were active at the same season AAFU championship (parallel round-robin competition).

- Cherkasy Oblast: **Khodak Cherkasy**
- Chernihiv Oblast (2): Polissia Dobrianka, **Yednist-2 Plysky**
- Chernivtsi Oblast: **Luzhany**
- Donetsk Oblast: Donbas-Krym Donetsk
- Ivano-Frankivsk Oblast: Tsementnyk Yamnytsia
- Kherson Oblast: Kakhovka
- Khmelnytskyi Oblast: Zbruch-Atrata Volochysk
- Kirovohrad Oblast: Olimpik Kirovohrad
- Kyiv Oblast (2): Irpin Horenychi, Svitanok Kovalivka
- Luhansk Oblast: Khimik Severodonetsk
- Lviv Oblast: Halychyna Lviv
- Mykolaiv Oblast (2): **Torpedo Mykolaiv**, Voronivka
- Odesa Oblast: Bryz Izmail
- Poltava Oblast: Velyka Bahachka
- Ternopil Oblast (2): Halych Zbarazh, Lan Velyka Berezovytsia
- Volyn Oblast (3): **BRV-VIK Volodymyr-Volynskyi**, Marianivka, Votrans Lutsk
- Zakarpattia Oblast: Mukachevo
- Zaporizhia Oblast: **Illich Osypenko**
- Zhytomyr Oblast (2): Arsenal Skrahlivka, **Metalurh Malyn**

== Bracket ==
The following is the bracket that demonstrates the last four rounds of the Ukrainian Cup, including the final match. Numbers in parentheses next to the match score represent the results of a penalty shoot-out.

Round of 16
Tsementnyk Yamnytsia	3	3	6
FC Luzhany	4	3	7
Lan Velyka Berezovytsia	0	1	1
Halychyna Lviv	1	6	7
Halych Zbarazh	3	3	6
BRV-VIK Volodymyr-Volynskyi	1	0	1
Svitanok Kovalivka	1	2	3
Polissya Dobrianka	3	0	3
Khodak Cherkasy	1	1	2
Irpin Horenychi	0	3	3
FC Velyka Bahachka	0	1	1
Yednist-2 Plysky	0	2	2
Donbas-Krym Donetsk	3	0	3
Torpedo Mykolaiv	6	2	8
FC Voronivka	2	0	2
Illich Osypenko	1	3	4

Quarter-finals
Halychyna Lviv	3	2	5
FC Luzhany	1	3	4
Halych Zbarazh	2	1	3
Polissya Dobrianka	0	3	3
Yednist-2 Plysky	2	0	2
Irpin Horenychi	1	4	4
Torpedo Mykolaiv	1	1	2
Illich Osypenko	2	1	3

Semi-finals
Halychyna Lviv	3	1	4
Halych Zbarazh	0	1	1
Illich Osypenko	0	0	0
Irpin Horenychi	0	2	2

Final
Halychyna Lviv	0	1	1
Irpin Horenychi	0	3	3

== Competition schedule ==
This year FC Luzhany, BRV-VIK Volodymyr-Volynskyi, Polissya Dobrianka, Irpin Horenychi, Yednist-2 Plysky, and Torpedo Mykolaiv received a bye to the second round (1/8 finals).

=== First round (1/16) ===
Team 1	Agg.	Team 2	1st leg	2nd leg
Tsementnyk Yamnytsia	4 – 2	FC Mukacheve	3–0	1–2
Zbruch-Astrata Volochysk	2 – 3	Lan Velyka Berezovytsia	0–1	2–2
Halychyna Lviv	9 – 4	Votrans Lutsk	5–0	4–4
Halych Zbarazh	14 – 2	FC Maryanivka	8–0	6–2
Arsenal Skrahlivka	1 – 4	Svitanok Kovalivka	1–0	0–4
Metalurh Malyn	1 – 4	Khodak Cherkasy	0–2	1–2
Olimpik Kirovohrad	1 – 5	FC Velyka Bahachka	1–1	0–4
Donbas-Krym Donetsk	4 – 3	Khimik Severodonetsk	1–2	3–1
FC Voronivka	3 – 0	Briz Izmail	2–0	1–0
SC Kakhovka	1 – 2	Illich Osypenko	1–0	0–2

=== Second round (1/8) ===
Team 1	Agg.	Team 2	1st leg	2nd leg
Tsementnyk Yamnytsia	6 – 7	FC Luzhany	3–4	3–3
Lan Velyka Berezovytsia	1 – 7	Halychyna Lviv	0–1	1–6
Halych Zbarazh	6 – 1	BRV-VIK Volodymyr-Volynskyi	3–1	3–0
Svitanok Kovalivka	3 – 3 (a)	Polissya Dobrianka	1–3	2–0
Khodak Cherkasy	2 – 3	Irpin Horenychi	1–0	1–3
FC Velyka Bahachka	1 – 2	Yednist-2 Plysky	0–0	1–2
Donbas-Krym Donetsk	3 – 8	Torpedo Mykolaiv	3–6	0–2
FC Voronivka	2 – 4	Illich Osypenko	2–1	0–3

=== Quarterfinals (1/4) ===
Team 1	Agg.	Team 2	1st leg	2nd leg
Halychyna Lviv	5 – 4	FC Luzhany	3–1	2–3
Halych Zbarazh	3 – 3 (a)	Polissya Dobrianka	2–0	1–3
Yednist-2 Plysky	2 – 5	Irpin Horenychi	2–1	0–4
Torpedo Mykolaiv	2 – 3	Illich Osypenko	1–2	1–1

=== Semifinals (1/2) ===
Team 1	Agg.	Team 2	1st leg	2nd leg
Halychyna Lviv	4 – 1	Halych Zbarazh	3–0	1–1
Illich Osypenko	0 – 2	Irpin Horenychi	0–0	0–2

=== Final ===
Team 1	Agg.	Team 2	1st leg	2nd leg
Halychyna Lviv	1 – 3	Irpin Horenychi	0–0	1–3

Winner of the 2008 Ukrainian Football Cup among amateur teams
Irpin Horenychi (Kyiv Oblast); 1st time

== See also ==
- 2008 Ukrainian Football Amateur League
- 2008–09 Ukrainian Cup
