= 2009 Ukrainian Amateur Cup =

2009 Ukrainian Cup among amateurs
Tournament details
- Country: Ukraine
- Teams: 22

Final positions
- Champions: Karpaty Yaremche
- Runners-up: Khodak Cherkasy

The 2009 Ukrainian Amateur Cup was the fourteenth annual season of Ukraine's football knockout competition for amateur football teams. The competition started on 12 August 2009 and concluded on 25 October 2009.

The cup holders FC Irpin Horenychi did not enter.

== Participated clubs ==
In bold are clubs that were active at the same season AAFU championship (parallel round-robin competition).

- Cherkasy Oblast: **Khodak Cherkasy**
- Chernihiv Oblast (2): Polissia Dobrianka, **Yednist-2 Plysky**
- Ivano-Frankivsk Oblast: Karpaty Yaremche
- Kharkiv Oblast: **Lokomotyv Kupiansk**
- Khmelnytskyi Oblast: Proskuriv Khmelnytskyi
- Kirovohrad Oblast (2): **Olimpik Kirovohrad**, UkrAhroKom Holovkivka
- Kyiv Oblast (2): Vyshneve, **Zenit Boyarka**
- Luhansk Oblast (2): Krasnodonvuhillia Krasnodon, Popasna
- Lviv Oblast: Karpaty Kamyanka-Buzka
- Mykolaiv Oblast: Voronivka
- Odesa Oblast (2): **Bastion-2 Illichivsk**, Bryz Izmail
- Rivne Oblast: **ODEK Orzhiv**
- Ternopil Oblast: Tovtry Kozliv
- Volyn Oblast: Shakhtar Novovolynsk
- Zakarpattia Oblast: Poliana
- Zhytomyr Oblast (2): Khimmash Korosten, Zviahel 750 Novohrad-Volynsky

== Bracket ==
The following is the bracket that demonstrates the last four rounds of the Ukrainian Cup, including the final match. Numbers in parentheses next to the match score represent the results of a penalty shoot-out.

Round of 16
Karpaty Kamyanka-Buzka	3	0	3
**Karpaty Yaremche**	3	**1**	**4**
ODEK Orzhiv	1	0	1
**FC Poliana**	**2**	**1**	**3**
Zviahel-750 Novohrad-Volynskyi	1	1	2
**Polissya Dobrianka**	**4**	**2**	**6**
Yednist-2 Plysky	3	0	3
**Khimmash Korosten**	3	**1**	**4**
**Bastion-2 Illichivsk**	**6**	**3**	**9**
Briz Izmail	0	0	0
**UkrAhroKom Holovkivka**	**3**	**2**	**5**
FC Vyshneve	2	1	3
**Krasnodonvuhillia Krasnodon**	**2**	**1**	**3**
FC Popasna	1	0	1

Quarter-finals
**Karpaty Yaremche**	**4**	0	**4**
FC Poliana	1	**2**	3
**Polissya Dobrianka**	**5**	**1**	**6**
Khimmash Korosten	1	0	1
**Khodak Cherkasy**	**2**	**3**	**5**
Bastion-2 Illichivsk	0	2	2
**UkrAhroKom Holovkivka**	**3**	2	**5**
Krasnodonvuhillia Krasnodon	1	2	3

Semi-finals
**Karpaty Yaremche**	**4**	0	**4**
Polissya Dobrianka	1	**2**	3
**Khodak Cherkasy**	**4**	**2**	**6**
UkrAhroKom Holovkivka	0	1	1

Final
Khodak Cherkasy	**2**	0	2
**Karpaty Yaremche**	0	**3**	**3**

== Competition schedule ==
=== Preliminary round ===
The matches were played on August 12 and 19, 2009.

Team 1	Agg.	Team 2	1st leg	2nd leg
Tovtry Kozliv	1 – 4	**FC Poliana**	1–1	0–3
Shakhtar Novovolynsk	2 – 7	**Zviahel-750 Novohrad-Volynskyi**	0–2	2–5
Proskuriv Khmelnytskyi	1 – 3	**Khimmash Korosten**	1–1	0–2
Olimpik Kirovohrad	0 – 6	**Khodak Cherkasy**	0–1	0–5
Zenit Boyarka	0 – 6	**Briz Izmail**	0–3	0–3
**UkrAhroKom Holovkivka**	2 – 2 (3–2 p)	FC Voronivka	1–1	1–1 (a.e.t.)
Lokomotyv Kupiansk	1 – 3	**FC Popasna**	1–0	0–3

Byes (8): Karpaty Kamyanka-Buzka, Karpaty Yaremche, ODEK Orzhiv, Polissya Dorbianka, Yednist-2 Plysky, Bastion-2 Illichivsk, FC Vyshneve, Krasnodonvuhillia Krasnodon

=== First round (1/8) ===
The matches were played on August 26 and September 2, 2009.

Team 1	Agg.	Team 2	1st leg	2nd leg
Karpaty Kamyanka-Buzka	3 – 4	**Karpaty Yaremche**	3–3	0–1
ODEK Orzhiv	1 – 3	**FC Poliana**	1–2	0–1
Zviahel-750 Novohrad-Volynskyi	2 – 6	**Polissya Dobrianka**	1–4	1–2
Yednist-2 Plysky	3 – 4	**Khimmash Korosten**	3–3	0–1
**Bastion-2 Illichivsk**	9 – 0	Briz Izmail	6–0	3–0
**UkrAhroKom Holovkivka**	5 – 3	FC Vyshneve	3–2	2–1
**Krasnodonvuhillia Krasnodon**	3 – 1	FC Popasna	2–1	1–0

Byes: Khodak Cherkasy

=== Quarterfinals (1/4) ===
The matches were played on September 9 and 23, 2009.

Team 1	Agg.	Team 2	1st leg	2nd leg
**Karpaty Yaremche**	4 – 3	FC Poliana	4–1	0–2
**Polissya Dobrianka**	6 – 1	Khimmash Korosten	5–1	1–0
**Khodak Cherkasy**	5 – 2	Bastion-2 Illichivsk	2–0	3–2
**UkrAhroKom Holovkivka**	5 – 3	Krasnodonvuhillia Krasnodon	3–1	2–2

=== Semifinals (1/2) ===
The matches were played on October 3-4, 10-11, 2009.

Team 1	Agg.	Team 2	1st leg	2nd leg
**Karpaty Yaremche**	4 – 3	Polissya Dobrianka	4–1	0–2
**Khodak Cherkasy**	6 – 1	UkrAhroKom Holovkivka	4–0	2–1

=== Final ===
The matches were played on October 17 and 25, 2009.

Team 1	Agg.	Team 2	1st leg	2nd leg
Khodak Cherkasy	2 – 3	**Karpaty Yaremche**	2–0	0–3

17 October 2009
15:00 LST

Khodak Cherkasy	2 – 0	Karpaty Yaremche
Hrishchenko 7' (pen.); Hopka 67'	Report

Municipal Central Stadium, Cherkasy
Attendance: 500
Referee: Viktor Chernyshov (Kremenchuk)

25 October 2009
14:00 LST

Karpaty Yaremche	3 – 0	Khodak Cherkasy
Tsyperdiuk 6', 90+3'; Ukrainets 85'	Report

Karpaty Stadium, Yaremche
Attendance: 3,000
Referee: Mykola Kryvonosov (Kyiv)

Winner of the 2009 Ukrainian Football Cup among amateur teams
**Karpaty Yaremche (Ivano-Frankivsk Oblast)**; **1st time**

== See also ==
- 2009 Ukrainian Football Amateur League
- 2009–10 Ukrainian Cup
