= 2006 Ukrainian Amateur Cup =

2006 Ukrainian Cup among amateurs
Tournament details
- Country: Ukraine

Final positions
- Champions: Karpaty Kamianka-Buzka
- Runners-up: Kolos Nikopol Raion

The 2006 Ukrainian Amateur Cup was the eleventh annual season of Ukraine's football knockout competition for amateur football teams. The competition started on 22 July 2006 and concluded on 8 October 2006.

The cup holders Pivdenstal Yenakieve did not enter.

== Participated clubs ==
In bold are clubs that were active at the same season AAFU championship (parallel round-robin competition).

- Chernihiv Oblast (2): FC Nizhyn, Avanhard Koryukivka
- Dnipropetrovsk Oblast: Kolos Nikopol Raion
- Donetsk Oblast: Illich-Ahro Mariupol
- Ivano-Frankivsk Oblast: FC Tuzhyliv
- Kherson Oblast: Myr Hornostaivka
- Kyiv: Alyans Kyiv
- Lviv Oblast (2): Knyazha Dobromyl, Karpaty Kamianka-Buzka
- Rivne Oblast: ODEK Orzhiv
- Ternopil Oblast (2): Brovar Mykulyntsi, Avanhard Monastyryshche
- Volyn Oblast: Votrans Lutsk
- Zaporizhia Oblast: FC Berdyansk
- Zakarpattia Oblast: FC Badalove

== Bracket ==
The following is the bracket that demonstrates the last four rounds of the Ukrainian Cup, including the final match. Numbers in parentheses next to the match score represent the results of a penalty shoot-out.

Round of 16
**Brovar Mykulyntsi**	**2**	0	**2**
Votrans Lutsk	0	0	0
**Knyazha Dobromyl**	**1**	**4**	**5**
FC Badalove	0	1	1
FC Tuzhyliv	0	1	1
**Karpaty Kamyanka-Buzka**	0	**5**	**5**
**FC Nizhyn**	**2**	1	**3**
Avanhard Koriukivka	0	1	1
**Alyans Kyiv**	2	**4**	**6**
Avanhard Monastyrysche	2	3	5
**Illich-Ahro Mariupol**	**5**	+	+
FC Berdiansk	0	-	-
Myr Hornostaivka	2	-	-
**Kolos Nikopol Raion**	**3**	+	+

Quarter-finals
Brovar Mykulyntsi	1	0	1
**ODEK Orzhiv**	1	**3**	**4**
Knyazha Dobromyl	0	0	0
**Karpaty Kamyanka-Buzka**	**1**	**1**	**2**
FC Nizhyn	0	2	2
**Alyans Kyiv**	**1**	2	**3**
Illich-Ahro Mariupol	1	0	1
**Kolos Nikopol Raion** (a)	1	0	**1**

Semi-finals
**Karpaty Kamyanka-Buzka**	**2**	**4**	**6**
ODEK Orzhiv	1	0	1
Alyans Kyiv	2	1	3
**Kolos Nikopol Raion**	2	**2**	**4**

Final
**Karpaty Kamyanka-Buzka**	0	**3**	**3**
Kolos Nikopol Raion	**1**	1	2

== Competition schedule ==
This year ODEK Orzhiv started from the quarterfinals. All the other teams started from the 1/8 finals.

=== First round (1/8) ===
Team 1	Agg.	Team 2	1st leg	2nd leg
**Knyazha Dobromyl**	5 – 1	FC Badalove	1–0	4–1
FC Tuzhyliv	1 – 5	**Karpaty Kamyanka-Buzka**	0–0	1–5
**Brovar Mykulyntsi**	2 – 0	Votrans Lutsk	2–0	0–0
**FC Nizhyn**	3 – 1	Avanhard Koriukivka	2–0	1–1
**Alyans Kyiv**	6 – 5	Avanhard Monastyrysche	2–2	4–3
**Illich-Ahro Mariupol**	w/o	FC Berdiansk	5–0	+:-
Myr Hornostaivka	w/o	**Kolos Nikopol Raion**	2–3	-:+

=== Quarterfinals (1/4) ===
Team 1	Agg.	Team 2	1st leg	2nd leg
Knyazha Dobromyl	0 – 2	**Karpaty Kamyanka-Buzka**	0–1	0–1
Brovar Mykulyntsi	1 – 4	**ODEK Orzhiv**	1–1	0–3
FC Nizhyn	2 – 3	**Alyans Kyiv**	0–1	2–2
Illich-Ahro Mariupol	1 – 1 (a)	**Kolos Nikopol Raion**	1–1	0–0

=== Semifinals (1/2) ===
Team 1	Agg.	Team 2	1st leg	2nd leg
**Karpaty Kamyanka-Buzka**	6 – 1	ODEK Orzhiv	2–1	4–0
Alyans Kyiv	3 – 4	**Kolos Nikopol Raion**	2–2	1–2

=== Final ===
Team 1	Agg.	Team 2	1st leg	2nd leg
**Karpaty Kamyanka-Buzka**	3 – 2	Kolos Nikopol Raion	0–1	3–1

Winner of the 2006 Ukrainian Football Cup among amateur teams
**Karpaty Kamyanka-Buzka (Lviv Oblast)**; **1st time**

== See also ==
- 2006 Ukrainian Football Amateur League
- 2006–07 Ukrainian Cup
