= 2007 Ukrainian Amateur Cup =

2007 Ukrainian Cup among amateurs
Tournament details
- Country: Ukraine
- Teams: 18

Final positions
- Champions: Yednist-2 Plysky
- Runners-up: Torpedo Mykolaiv

The 2007 Ukrainian Amateur Cup was the twelfth annual season of Ukraine's football knockout competition for amateur football teams. The competition started on 8 August 2007 and concluded on 21 October 2007.

The cup holders Karpaty Kamianka-Buzka did not enter.

== Participated clubs ==
In bold are clubs that were active at the same season AAFU championship (parallel round-robin competition).

- Cherkasy Oblast: **Khodak Cherkasy**
- Chernihiv Oblast (2): Nizhyn, **Yednist-2 Plysky**
- Dnipropetrovsk Oblast (2): Atlant Kryvyi Rih, Nikopol
- Kharkiv Oblast: Hazovyk Chervonyi Donets
- Kherson Oblast (2): Myr Hornostayivka, **Sihma Kherson**
- Khmelnytskyi Oblast: Konefermat Khmelnytskyi
- Kirovohrad Oblast: Ikar Kirovohrad
- Lviv Oblast: Rava Rava-Ruska
- Mykolaiv Oblast: Torpedo Mykolaiv
- Odesa Oblast (2): **Bastion Illichivsk**, **Briz Ismail**
- Rivne Oblast: **ODEK Orzhiv**
- Ternopil Oblast: Halych Zbarazh
- Vinnytsia Oblast: Laris Kalynivka
- Zhytomyr Oblast: **Metalurh Malyn**

== Bracket ==
The following is the bracket that demonstrates the last four rounds of the Ukrainian Cup, including the final match. Numbers in parentheses next to the match score represent the results of a penalty shoot-out.

Round of 16
Laris Kalynivka | 1 | 0 | 1
**ODEK Orzhiv** | **3** | **2** | **5**
Halych Zbarazh | 1 | 1 | 2
**Rava Rava-Rouska** | **2** | 1 | **3**
**FC Nizhyn** | **5** | 0 | **5**
Hazovyk Chervonyi Donets | 1 | 0 | 1
Metalurh Malyn | 0 | - | -
**Yednist-2 Plysky** | **1** | + | +
**Khodak Cherkasy** (a) | **2** | 1 | **3**
Bastion Illichivsk | 0 | **3** | 3
**Ikar Kirovohrad** | +'
Sihma Kherson | -
Myr Hornostaivka | 1 | 0 | 1
**Atlant Kryvyi Rih** | **2** | **2** | **4**
**Torpedo Mykolaiv** | **2** | **3** | **5**
Briz Izmail | 0 | 1 | 1

Quarter-finals
ODEK Orzhiv | **3** | 0 | 3
**Rava Rava-Rouska** | 2 | **2** | **4**
FC Nizhyn | 0 | 2 | 2
**Yednist-2 Plysky** | **1** | **3** | **4**
**Khodak Cherkasy** (a) | **1** | 2 | **3**
Ikar Kirovohrad | 0 | **3** | 3
Atlant Kryvyi Rih | 0 | 1 | 1
**Torpedo Mykolaiv** | **2** | 1 | **3**

Semi-finals
Rava Rava-Rouska | **2** | 0 | 2
**Yednist-2 Plysky** (a) | 1 | **1** | **2**
Khodak Cherkasy | 0 | 3 | 3
**Torpedo Mykolaiv** | **2** | 3 | **5**

Final
**Yednist-2 Plysky** | 0 | **2** | **2**
Torpedo Mykolaiv | 0 | 0 | 0

== Competition schedule ==
=== First round (1/16) ===
| Team 1 | Agg. | Team 2 | 1st leg | 2nd leg |
|---|---|---|---|---|
| Konfermat Khmelnytskyi | 1 – 7 | **Laris Kalynivka** | 0–1 | 1–6 |
| **Torpedo Mykolaiv** | 3 – 2 | FC Nikopol | 2–0 | 1–2 |

=== Second round (1/8) ===
| Team 1 | Agg. | Team 2 | 1st leg | 2nd leg |
|---|---|---|---|---|
| Laris Kalynivka | 1 – 5 | **ODEK Orzhiv** | 1–3 | 0–2 |
| Halych Zbarazh | 2 – 3 | **Rava Rava-Rouska** | 1–2 | 1–1 |
| **FC Nizhyn** | 5 – 1 | Hazovyk Chervonyi Donets | 5–1 | 0–0 |
| Metalurh Malyn | w/o | **Yednist-2 Plysky** | 0–1 | -:+ |
| **Khodak Cherkasy** | 3 – 3 (a) | Bastion Illichivsk | 2–0 | 1–3 |
| **Ikar Kirovohrad** | w/o | Sihma Kherson | +:- | +:- |
| Myr Hornostaivka | 1 – 4 | **Atlant Kryvyi Rih** | 1–2 | 0–2 |
| **Torpedo Mykolaiv** | 5 – 1 | Briz Izmail | 2–0 | 3–1 |

=== Quarterfinals (1/4) ===
| Team 1 | Agg. | Team 2 | 1st leg | 2nd leg |
|---|---|---|---|---|
| ODEK Orzhiv | 3 – 4 | **Rava Rava-Rouska** | 3–2 | 0–2 |
| FC Nizhyn | 2 – 4 | **Yednist-2 Plysky** | 0–1 | 2–3 |
| **Khodak Cherkasy** | 2 – 2 (a) | Ikar Kirovohrad | 1–0 | 2–3 |
| Atlant Kryvyi Rih | 1 – 3 | **Torpedo Mykolaiv** | 0–2 | 1–1 |

=== Semifinals (1/2) ===
| Team 1 | Agg. | Team 2 | 1st leg | 2nd leg |
|---|---|---|---|---|
| Rava Rava-Rouska | 2 – 2 (a) | **Yednist-2 Plysky** | 2–1 | 0–1 |
| Khodak Cherkasy | 3 – 5 | **Torpedo Mykolaiv** | 0–2 | 3–3 |

=== Final ===
| Team 1 | Agg. | Team 2 | 1st leg | 2nd leg |
|---|---|---|---|---|
| **Yednist-2 Plysky** | 2 – 0 | Torpedo Mykolaiv | 0–0 | 2–0 |

Winner of the 2007 Ukrainian Football Cup among amateur teams
**Yednist Plysky (Chernihiv Oblast)**; **2nd time**

== See also ==
- 2007 Ukrainian Football Amateur League
- 2007–08 Ukrainian Cup
