= Vitaliy Kobzar =

Kyrgyzstani and Ukrainian footballer

Personal information
- Full name: Vitaliy Yuriyovych Kobzar
- Date of birth: 9 May 1972 (age 54)
- Place of birth: Bishkek, Kyrgyz SSR
- Height: 1.71 m (5 ft 7 1/2 in)
- Position: Striker

Team information
- Current team: Cherkashchyna

Senior career*
Years	Team	Apps	(Gls)
1989–1993	FC Alga Frunze	127	(37)
1994–1995	FC Dnipro Cherkasy	66	(7)
1996	FC Krystal Chortkiv	30	(7)
1996–2002	FC Vorskla Poltava	157	(16)
1997–2002	→ FC Vorskla-2 Poltava	22	(11)
2003–2005	FC Obolon Kyiv	65	(4)
2005	FC Hirnyk Kryvyi Rih	1	(0)
2005–2006	FC Dnipro Cherkasy	21	(2)

International career
1992	Kyrgyzstan	5	(0)

Managerial career
- 2016: FC Cherkaskyi Dnipro (caretaker)
- 2017: FC Cherkaskyi Dnipro (caretaker)
- 2019: FC Cherkashchyna (caretaker)
- * Club domestic league appearances and goals

Vitaliy Yuriyovych Kobzar (Ukrainian: Віталій Юрійович Кобзар; born 9 May 1972) is a former Kyrgyzstani and Ukrainian footballer. He was a member of the Kyrgyzstan national football team.
