= 2001 Ukrainian Amateur Cup =

2001 Ukrainian Cup among amateurs
Tournament details
- Country: Ukraine

Final positions
- Champions: Pivdenstal Yenakieve
- Runners-up: SC Perechyn

The 2001 Ukrainian Amateur Cup was the sixth annual season of Ukraine's football knockout competition for amateur football teams. The competition started on 22 July 2001 and concluded on 6 October 2001.

The cup holders FC Luzhany did not enter.

== Participated clubs ==
In bold are clubs that are active at the same season AAFU championship (parallel round-robin competition).

- Cherkasy Oblast (1): Ikar Sobkivka
- Chernihiv Oblast (1): Zirka Koriukivka
- Donetsk Oblast (1): Pivdenstal Yenakieve
- Ivano-Frankivsk Oblast (1): Teplovyk Ivano-Frankivsk
- Kharkiv Oblast (1): Enerhetyk Komsomolske
- Kherson Oblast (1): Tavria Novotroitsk
- Khmelnytskyi Oblast (1): Spoliyelast Slavuta
- Kyiv (1): **Dnipro Kyiv**
- Poltava Oblast (1): ZemliaK Myrhorod
- Rivne Oblast (1): Khimik Rivne
- Sumy Oblast (2): Naftovyk-2 Okhtyrka, **Yavir Kranopillia**
- Zakarpattia Oblast (1): SC Perechyn
- Zhytomyr Oblast (1): **Systema-KKhP Cherniakhiv**

Notes

- Thirteen regions did not provide any teams for the tournament, among which were Crimea, the oblasts of Chernivtsi, Dnipropetrovsk, Kirovohrad, Kyiv, Luhansk, Lviv, Mykolaiv, Odesa, Ternopil, Vinnytsia, Volyn, and Zaporizhia.

== Bracket ==
The following is the bracket that demonstrates the last four rounds of the Ukrainian Cup, including the final match. Numbers in parentheses next to the match score represent the results of a penalty shoot-out.

Round of 16
Teplovyk Ivano-Frankivsk | 0 | - | -
**SC Perechyn** | **1** | + | +
Spoliyelast Slavuta | **1** | 0 | 1
**Khimik Rivne** | 0 | **3** | **3**
**Dnipro Kyiv** | **2** | 1 | **3**
Ikar Sobkivka | 1 | 1 | 2
**Enerhetyk Komsomolske** (a) | 1 | 2 | 3
Naftovyk-2 Okhtyrka | 1 | 2 | 3
**ZemliaK Myrhorod** | **4** | **2** | **6**
Yavir Krasnopilya | 1 | 0 | 1
**Pivdenstal Yenakieve** | **2** | **2** | **4**
Tavriya Novotroitske | 1 | 1 | 2

Quarter-finals
**SC Perechyn** | +
Khimik Rivne | -
Dnipro Kyiv | 1 | 1 | 2
**Systema-KKhP Cherniakhiv** | 1 | **3** | **4**
Enerhetyk Komsomolske | 1 | 0 | 1
**Zirka Koriukivka** | **2** | **1** | **3**
ZemliaK Myrhorod | 1 | 0 | 1
**Pivdenstal Yenakieve** | 1 | **2** | **3**

Semi-finals
**SC Perechyn** | **2** | 1 | **3**
Systema-KKhP Cherniakhiv | 1 | 1 | 2
Zirka Koriukivka | **1** | 0 | 1
**Pivdenstal Yenakieve** | 0 | **2** | **2**

Final
SC Perechyn | 1 | 0 | 1
**Pivdenstal Yenakieve** | **2** | **4** | **6**

== Competition schedule ==
=== First round (1/8) ===
| Team 1 | Agg. | Team 2 | 1st leg | 2nd leg |
|---|---|---|---|---|
| Teplovyk Ivano-Frankivsk | w/o | **SC Perechyn** | 0–1 | w/o |
| Spoliyelast Slavuta | 1–3 | **Khimik Rivne** | 1–0 | 0–3 |
| **Dnipro Kyiv** | 3–2 | Ikar Sobkivka | 2–1 | 1–1 |
| **Enerhetyk Komsomolske** | 3–3 (a) | Naftovyk-2 Okhtyrka | 1–1 | 2–2 |
| **ZemliaK Myrhorod** | 6–1 | Yavir Krasnopilya | 4–1 | 2–0 |
| **Pivdenstal Yenakieve** | 4–2 | Tavriya Novotroitsk | 2–1 | 2–1 |

=== Quarterfinals (1/4) ===
Some teams, Systema-KKhP Cherniakhiv and Zirka Koriukivka, started at quarterfinals.

| Team 1 | Agg. | Team 2 | 1st leg | 2nd leg |
|---|---|---|---|---|
| **SC Perechyn** | w/o | Khimik Rivne | — | — |
| Dnipro Kyiv | 2–4 | **Systema-KKhP Cherniakhiv** | 1–1 | 1–3 |
| Enerhetyk Komsomolske | 1–3 | **Zirka Koriukivka** | 1–2 | 0–1 |
| ZemliaK Myrhorod | 1–3 | **Pivdenstal Yenakieve** | 1–1 | 0–2 |

=== Semifinals (1/2) ===
| Team 1 | Agg. | Team 2 | 1st leg | 2nd leg |
|---|---|---|---|---|
| **SC Perechyn** | 3–2 | Systema-KKhP Cherniakhiv | 2–1 | 1–1 |
| Zirka Koriukivka | 1–2 | **Pivdenstal Yenakieve** | 1–0 | 0–2 |

=== Final ===
| Team 1 | Agg. | Team 2 | 1st leg | 2nd leg |
|---|---|---|---|---|
| SC Perechyn | 1–6 | **Pivdenstal Yenakieve** | 1–2 | 0–4 |

Winner of the 2001 Ukrainian Football Cup among amateur teams
**Pivdenstal Yenakieve (Donetsk Oblast)**; **1st time**

== See also ==
- 2001 Ukrainian Football Amateur League
- 2001–02 Ukrainian Cup
