= FC Cherkashchyna =

Professional football club based in Cherkasy, Ukraine

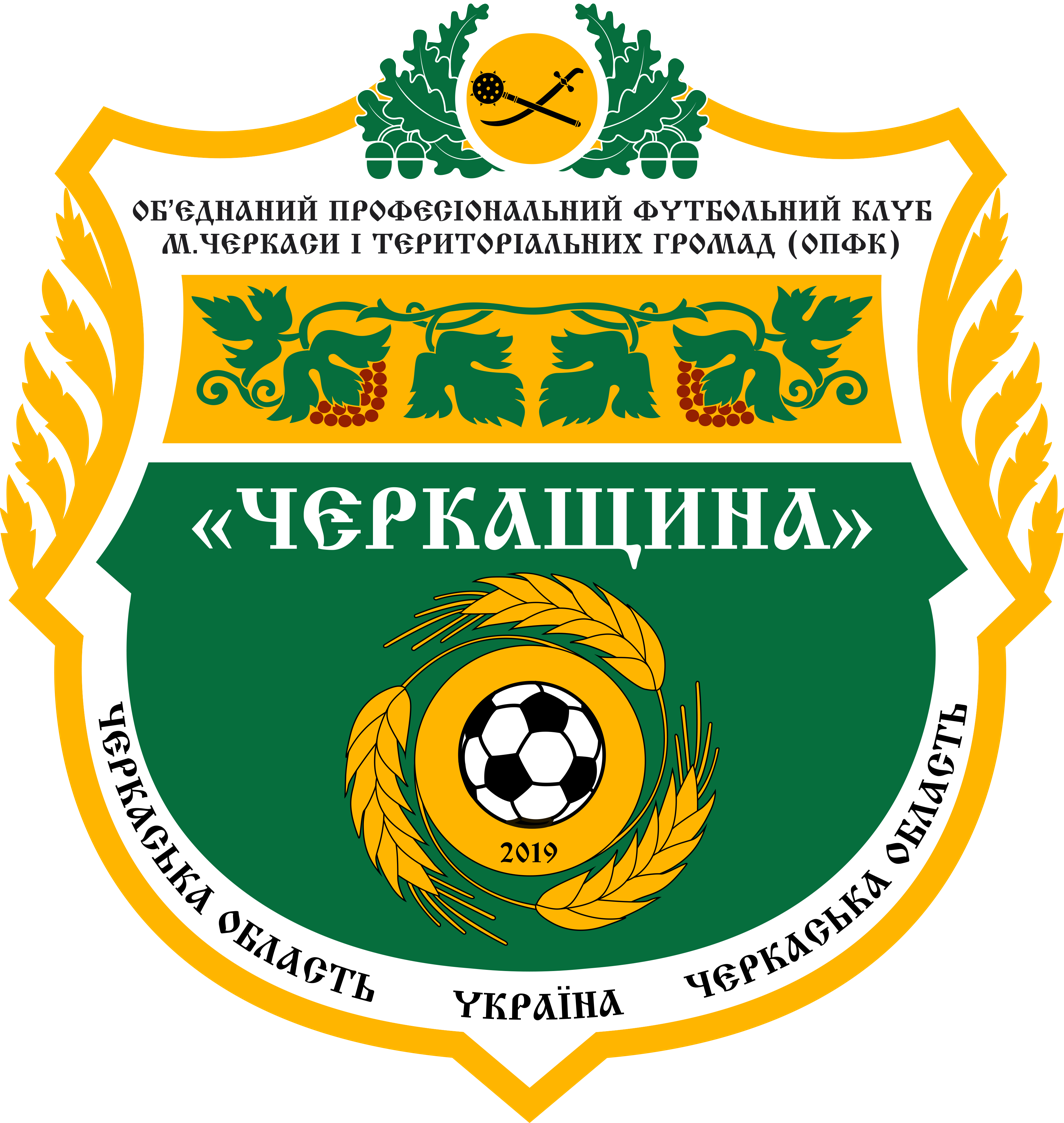
- Full name: FC Cherkashchyna
- Founded: 2010
- Dissolved: 2021
- Ground: Central Stadium, Cherkasy
- Capacity: 10,321
- Chairman: Henadiy Aldakymov
- Manager: Oleksandr Kyrylyuk
- League: Ukrainian Second League
- 2019–20: First League, 16th (relegated via play-offs)
- Website: https://черкащина.com/
Home colours	Away colours

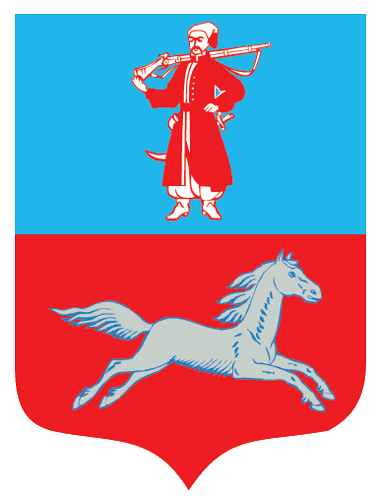
Cherkasy city coat of arms

Emblem Slavutych Cherkasy

FC Cherkashchyna (Ukrainian: ФК Черкащина) was a professional Ukrainian football club from the city of Cherkasy. The club's home ground was Central Stadium which was refurbished in 2003 and has a capacity of 10,321.

The club became the first that managed to reach semi-finals of the Ukrainian Cup in 2014, while playing in the Ukrainian Second League.

Established in 2010, the club was restructured in 2014. The club was dissolved in July 2018 and reformed as another new project based on its academy in Bilozirya.

== Team names ==
- 2004–2009 (first club)
  - 2004–2009: FC Khodak Cherkasy
- 2010–2018 (second club)
  - 2010–2014: FC Slavutych Cherkasy
  - 2014: FC Slavutych–Zorya Cherkasy
  - 2014–2018: FC Cherkaskyi Dnipro
- 2018–2021 (third club)
  - 2018–2019: FC Cherkashchyna-Akademiya Bilozirya
  - 2019–2021: FC Cherkashchyna

== History ==
=== Khodak Cherkasy ===
In 2004, there was registered club FC Khodak Cherkasy at a local food factory owned by Volodymyr Khodak. The factory team existed at least since 1998, but was registered as Khodak in 2004. Previously in 1983–1991, Volodymyr Khodak worked in field of sports in Cherkasy Oblast and headed the regional branch of Soviet DOSAAF. The new club played at regional competitions of Cherkasy Oblast. Beside own football team, the Khodak company also sponsored the city's professional basketball team Cherkaski Mavpy. In the late October 2009 Khodak lost to another amateur club Karpaty Yaremche at the Ukrainian Amateur Cup final consisted of two legs. After Ukrainian League Cup (2010) the club has disappeared.

=== Slavutych – Cherkaskyi Dnipro ===
In 2010, on initiative of the Cherkasy Oblast Governor Serhiy Tulub a new club was created under the name of Slavutych and supposedly without any relations to Dnipro. There is an idea that the new club was created based on former amateur club FC Khodak Cherkasy. In interview to regional sports newspaper "Cherkaskyi Sport" on 5 December 2019, the former player of Khodak acknowledged that the newly formed Slavutych was created based on Khodak. The club's vice-president became a leader of Party of Regions in Cherkasy Oblast Volodymyr Khodak.

In 2010, the new club applied for the Second League, but their application was denied. The deputy chairman of the Cherkasy Oblast said that the Football Federation has shown to much of their principle. The club started out in the 2011 Ukrainian Football Amateur League. The club submitted its license to the Professional Football League of Ukraine and was accepted into the Ukrainian Second League for the 2011–12 season. The June 20, 2011 decision of the Central Council of PFL team accepted the team's professional status. The new club received a new bus for transport as a gift and expansion for its sporting facilities. There were allocated funds on reconstruction of Tsentralnyi Stadion and Volodymyr Khodak confirmed that were expanded some of the stadium's facility, while others are expected to be completed in near future.

Soon after the establishment of the club (in 2011), the Dnipro ultras asked the club's leadership to return the city's club its original name of Dnipro instead of Slavutych and recognize the original club as a direct predecessor of Slavutych.

In 2013, the club was coached by former Ukrainian international footballer and the first captain of national team Ihor Petrov who in 2015 decided to develop football in the Russian occupied eastern Ukraine. In November 2013 on initiative of Serhiy Tulub, there was created the club's supervisory board headed by Valeriy Cherniak, while Volodymyr Lashkul, an owner of FC Zorya Bilozirya, became the club's general director. Serhiy Tulub was elected as an honorary president of the club. After Euromaidan in Kyiv, Serhiy Tulub ran (at night on 20–21 March 2014) and FC Cherkashchyna was taken under supervision of Lashkul.

With the ongoing Russian aggression against Ukraine, in March 2014 the club leadership was changed with a banker Ihor Doroshenko (Bank Mykhailivsky) replacing former Ukrainian statesman Serhiy Tulub.

The club known as FC Slavutych Cherkasy in July 2014 merged with neighbors FC Zorya Bilozirya and was initially renamed, Slavutych-Zorya Cherkasy. However the club decided to have input from their fans and the club was renamed to Cherkaskyi Dnipro. It placed the year of establishment of FC Dnipro Cherkasy 1955 on its club's shield.

On 30 October 2017, the club was reconstituted as United Football Club of the Cherkasy Region territorial communes "Cherkaskyi Dnipro – Bilozirya Academy", but renaming process was cancelled in December 2017.

=== Cherkashchyna-Akademiya ===
The club was dissolved in July 2018 and reorganized based on its academy in Bilozirya. FC Zorya-Akademia Bilozirya changed its name to FC Cherkashchyna-Akademiya-2 Bilozirya and continues to compete at regional level.

On 1 February 2019, the long-time head coach of Dnipro-Slavutych-Cherkashchyna Oleksandr Kyrylyuk expressed his expectations to get his club promoted to the First League approving the current format and composition of the Second League.

In September 2019, the former president of Cherkashchyna Volodymyr Lashkul announced that he withdraws financing of the club. Right away there surfaced talks about FC Cherkashchyna will dissolve. Lashkul pointed out to lack of interest to the club from local authorities and new MFC Dnipro Cherkasy that joined the Ukrainian Football Amateur League in 2019 with plans to join the Ukrainian Second League in 2020.

Soon after the Lushkul's state the club's general director Yuriy Kolesnyk stated that whoever spreads information about withdrawal of Cherkashchyna, he is the team's enemy number one.

During winter break 2019–20, the senior team was abandoned by its owners and taken over by Football Federation of Cherkasy Oblast to avoid withdrawal of the club mid season. The former owners reorganized based on their own club FC Zorya-Akademia Bilozirya.

At the end of February 2020, it was announced that the club has means to finish the season. Few days later it was announced that the club plans to appoint a new head coach, presumably Denys Marynchuk.

== Honours ==
=== Cherkaskyi Dnipro ===
- Ukrainian First League
  - Runners-up (1): 2015–16
- PFL U-19
  - Winners (1): 2016–17
  - Runners-up (1): 2017–18
- Ukrainian Second League
  - Winners (1): 2014–15

=== Khodak Cherkasy ===
- Ukrainian Amateur Cup
  - Runners-up (1): 2009
- Cherkasy Oblast Football Championship
  - Winners (3): 2005, 2006, 2008
  - Runners-up (1): 2004

== Players ==
=== Last squad ===
As of 10 July 2020

Note: Flags indicate national team as defined under FIFA eligibility rules; some limited exceptions apply. Players may hold more than one non-FIFA nationality.

No.	Pos.	Nation	Player
3	MF	(Senegal) SEN	Souleymane Diong
7	FW	(Ukraine) UKR	Maksym Tyshchenko
9	MF	(Ukraine) UKR	Anton Dolhyi
10	MF	(Ukraine) UKR	Yevhen Morozenko
11	MF	(Ukraine) UKR	Ihor Nechay
17	FW	(Ukraine) UKR	Kostyantyn Yatsyk
20	FW	(Ukraine) UKR	Rostyslav Taranukha
22	DF	(Ukraine) UKR	Andriy Nesterenko

No.	Pos.	Nation	Player
14	MF	(Ukraine) UKR	Yaroslav Zakharevych
29	MF	(Ukraine) UKR	Yuriy Malyei
33	DF	(Ukraine) UKR	Ivan Sklyarenko
44	MF	(Ukraine) UKR	Oleh Dmytrenko
70	FW	(Ukraine) UKR	Artem Tyshchenko
77	FW	(Ukraine) UKR	Maksym Skrypnyk
95	MF	(Ukraine) UKR	Tymur Pohranichnyi
90	FW	(Ukraine) UKR	Vladyslav Kabanyuk
—	GK	(Ukraine) UKR	Yevhen Stryzh

== League and cup history ==
Season	Div.	Pos.	Pl.	W	D	L	GS	GA	P	Domestic Cup	Other		Notes
FC Khodak Cherkasy
2006	4th	1	4	2	2	0	8	3	8				
2006	4th	2	6	2	3	1	7	4	9				
2006	4th	2	3	1	2	0	5	3	5		Play-off	3rd place	
2007	4th	3	8	3	3	2	15	10	12		AC	Semifinals	
2008	4th	4	8	2	1	5	10	13	7		AC	Round of 16	
2009	4th	4	6	2	0	4	4	5	6		AC	Final	
2009–10	4th	4	6	2	0	4	4	5	6		PFL LC	Group Stage	
FC Slavutych Cherkasy
2011	4th	5	10	4	0	6	8	17	12				
2011–12	3rd "A"	3	26	15	8	3	35	15	53	1/32 finals			
2012–13	3rd "A"	4	20	10	4	6	26	18	34	1/16 finals			
2012–13	3rd "1"	3	30	15	7	8	47	28	52	1/16 finals			Stage 2
2013–14	3rd	7	36	20	5	11	49	33	65	1/2 finals			
FC Cherkaskyi Dnipro
2014–15	3rd	1	27	20	5	2	54	12	65	1/16 finals			Promoted
2015–16	2nd	2	30	16	7	7	45	27	55	1/16 finals			
2016–17	2nd	8	34	12	12	10	30	29	48	1/16 finals			
2017–18	2nd	17	33	8	4	21	27	47	28	1/32 finals			Relegated
Reformed as FC Cherkashchyna-Akademiya Bilozirya
2018–19	3rd	2	27	14	6	7	43	23	48	1/8 finals			Promoted
FC Cherkashchyna
2019–20	2nd	16	30	1	4	25	23	74	7	1/32 finals			Lost playoffs; Relegated
2020–21	3rd	—	10	5	4	1	14	7	19	1/64 finals			Withdrew; Results annulled

== List of head coaches ==
- 2011–2012: Oleksandr Kyrylyuk
- 2012–2013: Anatoliy Deineko (caretaker)
- 2013: Serhiy Puchkov
- 2013: Ihor Petrov
- 2013–2014: Yuriy Bakalov
- 2014: Ihor Stolovytskyi (caretaker)
- 2014–2016: Ihor Stolovytskyi
- 2016: Oleksandr Kyrylyuk
- 2016: Vitaliy Kobzar (caretaker)
- 2016–2017: Vadym Yevtushenko
- 2017: Vitaliy Kobzar (caretaker)
- 2017: Oleksandr Kyrylyuk
- 2017–2018: Ihor Stolovytskyi
- 2018–: Oleksandr Kyrylyuk

== See also ==
- Dnipro Cherkasy
- Zorya Bilozirya
