= Anton Dolhyi =

Ukrainian football midfielder

Personal information
- Full name: Anton Serhiyovych Dolhyi
- Date of birth: 26 March 1992 (age 34)
- Place of birth: Kyiv, Ukraine
- Height: 1.83 m (6 ft 0 in)
- Position: Midfielder

Youth career
- 2005–2009: Dynamo Kyiv

Senior career*
Years	Team	Apps	(Gls)
2009–2011	Dynamo Kyiv	0	(0)
2009	→ Dynamo-2 Kyiv	2	(0)
2011–2013	Metalurh Donetsk	0	(0)
2012	→ Zirka Kirovohrad (loan)	11	(0)
2012–2013	→ Helios Kharkiv (loan)	26	(0)
2015–2016	Aves	8	(0)
2016	→ Tirsense (loan)	1	(0)
2016–2017	Ponte da Barca	24	(1)
2017–2018	Niki Volos	0	(0)
2019	Chaika	14	(1)
2020	Cherkashchyna	19	(1)

International career
2008–2009	Ukraine-17	9	(0)
2009	Ukraine-18	6	(0)
2010–2011	Ukraine-19	6	(0)
- * Club domestic league appearances and goals as of 17:34, 18 July 2021 (UTC)

Anton Dolhyi (Ukrainian: Антон Сергійович Долгий; born 26 March 1992) is a Ukrainian football midfielder.

Dolhyi is a product of FC Dynamo Kyiv youth sportive school system and spent some years in the different teams of the Ukrainian First League. In August 2015 he signed a two-year contract with Portuguese club Aves.
