= Ihor Cherednichenko =

Ukrainian professional footballer

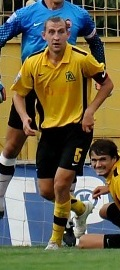
- Ihor Cherednichenko, defender of PFC Oleksandriya c. 2011

Personal information
- Date of birth: 9 May 1984 (age 42)
- Place of birth: Kharkiv, Ukrainian SSR
- Height: 1.81 m (5 ft 11 1/2 in)
- Position: Defender

Senior career*
| Years | Team | Apps | (Gls) |
| 2001–2005 | Metalist Kharkiv | 13 | (1) |
| 2001–2005 | → Metalist-2 Kharkiv | 69 | (1) |
| 2005–2012 | Oleksandriya | 202 | (18) |
| 2013 | Torpedo-BelAZ Zhodino | 25 | (0) |
| 2014 | Zirka Kirovohrad | 17 | (1) |
| 2015 | Hirnyk Kryvyi Rih | 10 | (0) |
| 2015–2017 | Helios Kharkiv | 51 | (1) |
| 2017–2018 | Metalist 1925 Kharkiv | 28 | (1) |
| 2018 | Polissya Zhytomyr | 17 | (0) |
| 2019–2021 | Viktoriya Mykolaivka (amateur) | | |
- * Club domestic league appearances and goals as of 31 December 2018

Ihor Cherednichenko (Ukrainian: Ігор Вікторович Чередніченко; born 9 May 1984) is a Ukrainian former professional footballer.

In 2016, he played for Helios Kharkiv.
