= FC Irpin Horenychi =

Football club from Horenychi, Ukraine

FC Irpin Horenychi was an amateur football club from Horenychi and participated in the regional competitions of Kyiv Oblast. The club became famous for fielding former Ukraine international footballers who were about to retire from professional sport.

The club was founded in 2005 and dissolved in 2009.

Horenychi previously had a football team that won several champion titles of Kyiv Oblast in the 1960s and 1970s.

== Honours ==
Ukrainian Amateur Cup

- Winners: 2008

== Former players ==
Andriy Kovtun, Mykola Volosyanko, Vladyslav Vashchuk, Anatoliy Bezsmertnyi, Yuriy Dmytrulin, Andriy Annenkov, Eduard Tsykhmeistruk, Serhiy Nahornyak, Vitaliy Kosovskyi, Serhiy Konovalov, Serhii Rebrov, Taras Lutsenko, Artem Yashkin, Vasyl Kardash, Valyantsin Byalkevich, Yuriy Hrytsyna, and Viktor Ulyanytsky, among others.
