= FC Karpaty Yaremche =

Ukrainian football club

FC Karpaty Yaremche is an amateur club from Yaremche and the regional competitions of Ivano-Frankivsk Oblast. The club plays at Karpaty Stadium that holds 1,000 spectators. The club participated in the 2010-11 Ukrainian Cup.

The club originally was founded in 1985 as Spartak Yaremche and in 1989 changed to Karpaty.

== Honours ==
Ukrainian Amateur Cup

- Winners (1): 2009
