= Yuriy Pleshakov =

Ukrainian-Russian footballer (1988–2020)

Personal information
- Full name: Yuriy Serhiyovych Pleshakov
- Date of birth: 29 August 1988
- Place of birth: Sevastopol, Ukrainian SSR, Soviet Union
- Date of death: 22 November 2020 (aged 32)
- Place of death: Sevastopol, Ukraine (Note: since 2014 Sevastopol is occupied by Russia.)
- Height: 1.87 m (6 ft 1 1/2 in)
- Position: Forward

Youth career
- 2002–2005: Sevastopol

Senior career*
Years	Team	Apps	(Gls)
2005–2006	Metalist Kharkiv	0	(0)
2006–2012	Sevastopol	61	(19)
2008–2012	→ Sevastopol-2	23	(5)
2011	→ Belshina Bobruisk (loan)	11	(0)
2013–2014	Desna Chernihiv	18	(5)
2014	Stal Dniprodzerzhynsk	15	(1)
2015–2018	SKChF Sevastopol	47	(13)
- * Club domestic league appearances and goals as of 30 June 2018

Yuriy Pleshakov (Ukrainian: Юрій Сергійович Плешаков, Russian: Юрий Сергеевич Плешаков; 29 August 1988 – 22 November 2020) was a Ukrainian (until 2014) and Russian football forward.
