= Yevhen Odyntsov =

Ukrainian footballer

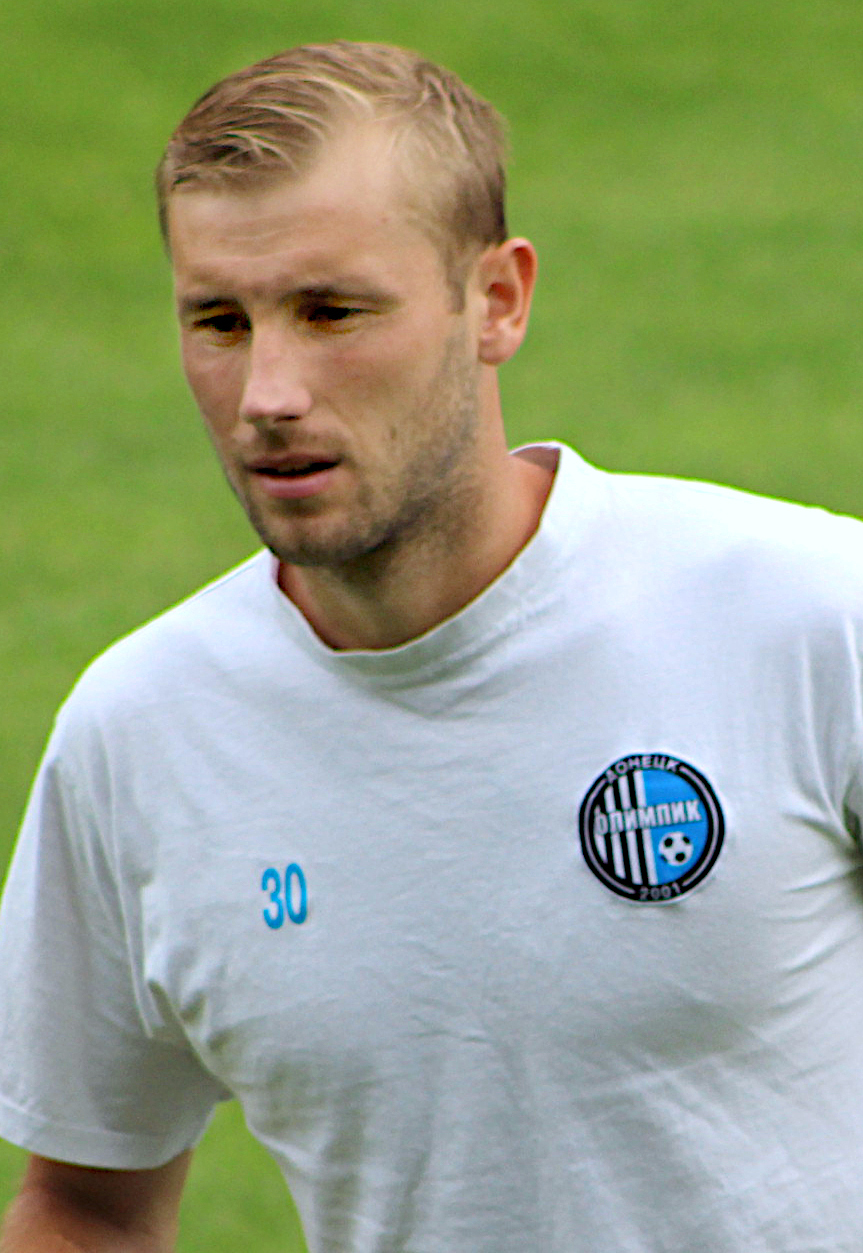

Personal information
- Full name: Yevhen Yuriyovych Odyntsov
- Date of birth: 23 August 1986 (age 40)
- Place of birth: Yevpatoria, Krym Oblast, Ukrainian SSR
- Height: 1.79 m (5 ft 10 1/2 in)
- Position: Midfielder

Team information
- Current team: TSK Simferopol
- Number: 30

Youth career
- 2000–2003: UOR Simferopol

Senior career*
Years	Team	Apps	(Gls)
2005–2006	Tavriya Simferopol	1	(1)
2006–2007	Khimik Krasnoperekopsk	24	(1)
2007–2008	Dnipro Cherkasy	34	(1)
2008–2010	Naftovyk-Ukrnafta Okhtyrka	56	(7)
2010–2012	Stal Alchevsk	50	(5)
2012–2013	Poltava	30	(2)
2013–2014	Olimpik Donetsk	10	(1)
2015–	TSK Simferopol	28	(15)
- * Club domestic league appearances and goals as of 25 May 2016

Yevhen Odyntsov (Ukrainian: Євген Юрійович Одинцов, Russian: Евгений Юрьевич Одинцов; born 23 August 1986) is a Ukrainian football midfielder who plays for TSK Simferopol.

Odyntsov is a product of the UOR Simferopol youth sportive school and spent time playing for different Ukrainian teams. In July 2013 he signed a contract with FC Olimpik Donetsk.
