= FC Halychyna Lviv =

Ukrainian football club

FC Halychyna Lviv is an amateur club from the regional competitions of Lviv Oblast. The club participated in the 2007-08 Ukrainian Cup.

The club originally was founded in 2005 as Karpaty Kamyanka-Buzka, but in 2007 moved to Lviv and changed its name to Halychyna Lviv. In 2008 the city authorities of Kamyanka-Buzka reestablished another team Karpaty Kamyanka Buzka.

The very first club was established back in 1988 and competed in the Soviet championship. With the fall of the Soviet Union the club moved to Stryi and renamed to Skala Stryi.

== Honours ==
Ukrainian Amateur Cup

- Winners (1): 2006 (as Karpaty Kamyanka-Buzka)
