= FC Haray Zhovkva =

Ukrainian football club

FC Haray Zhovkva is an amateur Ukrainian football team based in Zhovkva, Lviv Oblast.

The team spent several years in the Ukrainian Second Division before was relegated at the end of the 1998–99 season along with FC Krystal Chortkiv. On the amateur level Haray won the cup competition of the Amateur Association in 2002.

The club won the 1994 Lviv Oblast Championships. Currently, the club competes on the regional level in the Lviv Oblast competition with more modest results than in the past.

== League and cup history ==
Season	Div.	Pos.	Pl.	W	D	L	GS	GA	P	Domestic Cup	Europe	Notes
1995–96	3rd "A"	8	40	20	7	13	49	35	67			
1996–97	3rd "A"	10	30	10	7	13	29	28	37			
1997–98	3rd "A"	16	34	9	11	14	29	43	38			
1998–99	3rd "A"	15	28	2	4	22	9	16	4			Relegated; 6 pts deducted
