= FC Pivdenstal Yenakiieve =

Ukrainian football club

FC Pivdenstal Yenakiieve, also known by its Russian transcription as Yugostal (Russian: Футбольный клуб «Югосталь», Ukrainian: Футбольний клуб "Південьсталь") was a Ukrainian football club from Yenakiieve, Donetsk Oblast.

== History ==
In 1913, a football team was organized at the Petrovsky Metallurgical Plant. Workers' access to this team was limited by the charter, as well as large membership fees. Information about only two players of the first team of the plant has survived. Those were the full-back (defender), a French engineer De-Sev and the goalkeeper, an employee of the main office Apelchenko. The "metallurgists" played games on the football field in the area of the St.Nicholas Church (the area of the modern sintering plant) and on suitable wastelands of the workers' settlements of Zarudni, Zamkovka, Pivnovka and others.

The team played in the championship of Donetsk Oblast, rarely making it into the championship of the republic (Ukrainian SSR).

In 1957, after finishing his playing career, native of Yenakiieve Alexey Pshenichny, winner of the 1944 Soviet Cup as part of Zenit Leningrad, returned to his hometown. Pshenichny became the head coach of the local Metallurg and was able to very quickly improve the results of the factory team. In 1961, the team became the champion of Donetsk Oblast and received the right to contest for a place in Class B of the Soviet Football Championship. In the transition matches (play-offs), Avanhard from Kramatorsk was stronger (0:4, 2:1). The following season, Metallurg was again the champion of the region (Donetsk). This time, the opponent of the Yenakiyevo team in the transition matches was Shakhtar from Horlivka. The factory team, led by Alexey Pshenichny, defeated the Horlivka team (0:0, 1:0) and for the first time in history won the right to participate in the Soviet Football Championship in Class B.

Being newcomers in Class B, the Metallurg footballers took one of the last places in the republic championship - 36th out of 40. The defense line played very poorly, conceding 74 goals. Such a low place in the tournament meant that Metallurg had to prove its right to a place among the master teams in the transition matches with the regional champion. The Shakhtar team (Chystiakove) was beaten in both matches (1:0, 2:0). In 1964, the factory team slightly improved its results, becoming ninth in the zone.

From 1971 to 1983, Yenakiyevo metallurgists played in the championship of the Donetsk region. In 1984, with the arrival of coaches V. I. Nikitenko and V. I. Ivanov to Metallurg, the metallurgists became the winners of the final games of the best teams of the region. This allowed the factory footballers to gain the right to play in the championship of the Ukrainian SSR 15 years later. After an unsuccessful performance in 1985.

In December 1985, another local specialist, Yuri Klokov, returned to Yenakiieve. He began to create a new team, relying mainly on Yenakiieve football players. The work of the coach and players was crowned with double success. Metallurg reached the regional Cup final for the first time and, having won a prize place in the Donetsk regional championship, again won the right to play in the championship of the Ukrainian SSR among physical education teams. In 1987, the Yenakiieve Metallurgical Plant team was called Pivdenstal (Yugostal). In the same year, Pivdenstal won the M. Merzhanov Cup. Then - the Donetsk Cup. Having won the Cup, the charges of Y. Klokov and V. Fedorishchev joined the fight for the Ukrainian Cup. The opening match in Stakhanov - 3:1. The next game was held at home with Transformer (Zaporozhye). Again a victory with the same score. The only goal brought victory in the semi-final in Lozova. Then followed a two-match final with Avangard. The first match took place in Drohobych. The visitors lost 0:2. In the return match, 10 thousand fans of Yenakiyevo supported Pivdenstal. The Makeyevka team opened the scoring with a penalty kick. In the 90th minute, after a corner kick, the score became 2:0, and in the aggregate of the two matches - 2:2. The referee appointed extra time. The Yenakiyevites continued to attack, and in one of the episodes in the guests' penalty area, V. Gromov was knocked down. Another penalty and the winning goal. Pivdenstal received the Ukrainian Cup, and with it the prize of the republican newspaper "Radyanska Ukraina".

This success of the factory team did not go unnoticed. Players and coach Y. Klokov began to be invited to various teams. Coaches sometimes changed two or three times in one season, which did not contribute to the improvement of Pivdenstal's play. Despite this, in the period from 1988 to 2005, Pivdenstal almost every year participated in the championship of the Ukrainian SSR, and then of Ukraine. Yenakiyevites were able to repeat their greatest success twice, winning the Ukrainian Amateur Cup in 2001 and 2005.

In 2002, Pivdenstal, as the winner of the Ukrainian Cup, took part in the 2002/03 UEFA Regions' Cup. In the first match of the group tournament, Yenakiyevites lost to the Azerbaijani FC Goyazan (Football Club) Goyazan 0:1. The next two games against the Greek Imathia and Georgian Tbilisi teams were won 7:0 and 6:0, respectively, but the first place in the group, giving the right to continue playing in the tournament, was taken by the Azerbaijanis. Pivdenstal was content with the title of the most productive Ukrainian team in the history of the tournament.

The club won the 2001 Ukrainian Amateur Cup.
