= 2011–12 Ukrainian Cup =

Kubok Ukrainy

Tournament details
- Country: Ukraine
- Dates: 16 July 2011 – 6 May 2012; 16 July – 17 August 2011 (preliminary rounds); 21 September 2011 – 6 May 2012 (main event)
- Teams: 58

Final positions
- Champions: Shakhtar Donetsk (8th title)
- Runners-up: Metalurh Donetsk
- Semifinalists: Volyn Lutsk; Karpaty Lviv

Tournament statistics
- Matches played: 53
- Goals scored: 130 (2.45 per match)
- Top goal scorer: (Brazil) Maicon – 5

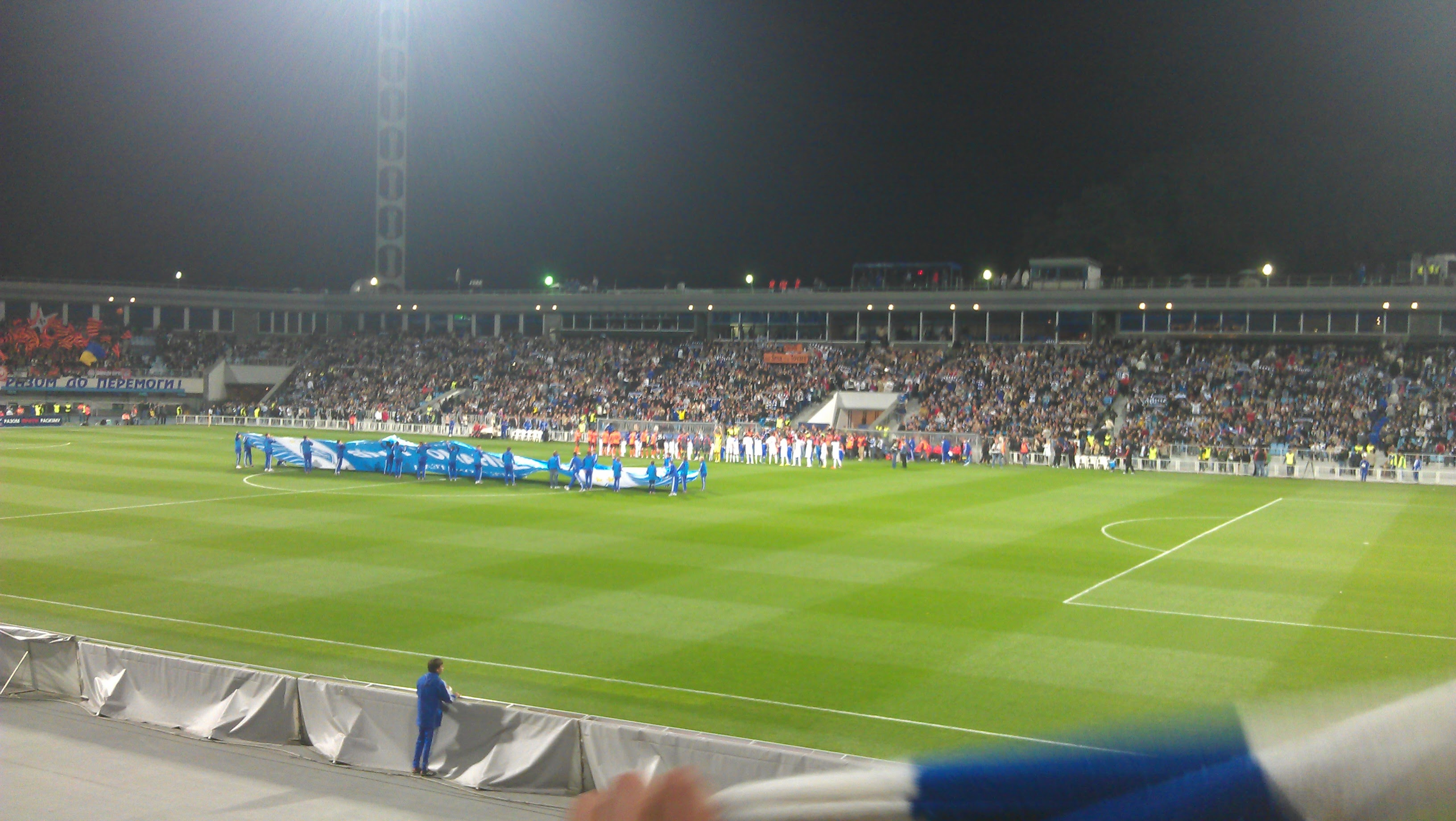
Round of 16 game Dynamo Kyiv - Shakhtar Donetsk

The 2011–12 Ukrainian Cup was the 21st annual season of Ukraine's football knockout competition, and fourth under the name of DATAGROUP – Football Ukraine Cup.

The Cup begins with two preliminary rounds, before the first round proper involving the Premier League clubs. The draw for both the preliminary rounds was held on July 7, 2011. The First Preliminary Round consists of teams from Druha Liha and Amateur Cup finalists. In the Second Preliminary Round teams of the Persha Liha enter the competition. Sixteen teams, the winners of the 2nd preliminary round, enter the First Round proper or the Round of 32 where the Premier League teams enter the competition for the first time. The winner of the competition qualifies for the play-off round of the 2012–13 UEFA Europa League.

Shakhtar Donetsk were the defending Ukrainian Cup champions and as a member of the Premier League enter the competition in the Round of 32. Shakhtar Donetsk retained the cup by defeating FC Metalurh Donetsk 2–1 in the final.

== Team allocation ==
Fifty eight teams entered the Ukrainian Cup competition.

=== Distribution ===
| | Teams entering in this round | Teams advancing from previous round |
|---|---|---|
| First qualifying round (20 teams) | 18 participants of the Second League; 2 participants of the Amateur Cup final | |
| Second qualifying round (32 teams) | 17 participants of the First League; 5 participants of the Second League | 10 winners from the first qualifying round |
| Tournament proper (32 teams) | 16 participants of the Premier League | 16 winners from the second qualifying round |

=== Round and draw dates ===
All draws held at FFU headquarters (Building of Football) in Kyiv unless stated otherwise.

| Phase | Round | Draw date | Game date |
|---|---|---|---|
| Qualifying | First qualifying round | 7 July 2011 | 16 July 2011 |
| Qualifying | Second qualifying round | 7 July 2011 | 16–17 August 2011 |
| Main event | Round of 32 | 8 September 2011 | 21 September 2011 |
| Main event | Round of 16 | 13 October 2011 | 26 October 2011 |
| Main event | Quarter-finals | 15 March 2012 | 11 April 2012 |
| Main event | Semi-finals | 12 April 2012 | 27–28 April 2012 |
| Main event | Final | 6 May 2012 at NSC "Olimpiyskiy", Kyiv | |

=== Teams ===
| Enter in First Round | | Enter in Second Round | | Enter in Round of 32 |
| AAFU; 2 teams | PFL League 2; 18/30 teams | PFL League 2; 5/30 teams | PFL League 1; 17/18 teams | UPL; 16/16 teams |
| Berehvydeyk Berehove; Slovkhlib Slovyansk | Avanhard Kramatorsk*; Bastion Illichivsk; Desna Chernihiv; Dynamo Khmelnytskyi; Hirnyk Kryvyi Rih; Hirnyk-Sport Komsomolsk; Krystal Kherson*; Makiyivvuhillya Makiyivka*; Myr Hornostayivka*; Nyva Ternopil; Real Pharma Yuzhne*; Shakhtar Sverdlovsk; SKAD-Yalpuh Bolhrad*; Skala Stryi; Slavutych Cherkasy*; Stal Dniprodzerzhynsk; UkrAhroKom Pryiutivka*; Zhytychi Zhytomyr* | Enerhiya Nova Kakhovka; Kremin Kremenchuk; FC Poltava; Prykarpattia Ivano-Frankivsk; PFC Sumy | Arsenal Bila Tserkva; Bukovyna Chernivtsi; Enerhetyk Burshtyn; Helios Kharkiv; Hoverla Uzhhorod; Krymteplytsia Molodizhne; FC Lviv; Metalurh Zaporizhia; MFC Mykolaiv; Naftovyk-Ukrnafta; Nyva Vinnytsia; FC Odesa; Olimpik Donetsk; PFC Sevastopol; Stal Alchevsk; Tytan Armyansk; Zirka Kirovohrad | Arsenal Kyiv; Chornomorets Odesa; Dnipro Dnipropetrovsk; Dynamo Kyiv; Illichivets Mariupol; Karpaty Lviv; Kryvbas Kryvyi Rih; Metalist Kharkiv; Metalurh Donetsk; Obolon Kyiv; FC Oleksandriya; Shakhtar Donetsk; Tavriya Simferopol; Volyn Lutsk; Vorskla Poltava; Zorya Luhansk |

Notes:

- With the asterisk (*) are noted the Second League teams that were recently admitted to the league from amateurs and the AAFU (amateur) team(s) that qualified in place of the Amateur Cup finalist(s).
- Reserve teams from the Second League: Shakhtar-3, Chornomorets-2, Dnipro-2, Sevastopol-2, Metalurh-2 (Zaporizhia), Illichivets-2; and Dynamo-2 from the First League were not included in the draw.
- Yednist Plysky (PFL League 2) did not enter the competition.

=== Bracket ===
The pairings for each round were not known from the incept.

Round 32
2L | FC Sumy (p) | 1 (3)
1L | Zirka Kirovohrad | 1 (2)
AM | Slovkhlib Slovyansk | 0
PL | Zorya Luhansk | 2
PL | Metalurh Donetsk | 2
PL | Tavriya Simferopol | 0
1L | Arsenal Bila Tserkva | 2
PL | Kryvbas Kryvyi Rih (a.e.t.) | 3
2L | FC Poltava | 0
PL | Karpaty Lviv | 1
AM | Berehvydeyk Berehove | 0
PL | Metalist Kharkiv | 3
2L | Stal Dniprodzerzhynsk | 2
1L | PFC Sevastopol | 1
1L | Enerhetyk Burshtyn | 0
PL | Chornomorets Odesa | 1
1L | Bukovyna Chernivtsi | 2
PL | Obolon Kyiv | 1
PL | Arsenal Kyiv | 5
PL | PFC Oleksandria | 0
PL | Volyn Lutsk | 7
PL | Illichivets Mariupol | 1
1L | Tytan Armyansk | 0
PL | Dnipro Dnipropetrovsk | 1
1L | Metalurh Zaporizhya | 1
1L | Hoverla-Zak. Uzhhorod | 0
1L | MFK Mykolaiv | 0
PL | Vorskla Poltava | 2
2L | Kremin Kremenchuk | 2
PL | Dynamo Kyiv | 3
2L | Shakhtar Sverdlovsk | 0
PL | Shakhtar Donetsk | 2

Round 16
2L | FC Sumy | 1
PL | Zorya Luhansk | 3
PL | Metalurh Donetsk | 4
PL | Kryvbas Kryvyi Rih | 0
PL | Karpaty Lviv | 1
PL | Metalist Kharkiv | 0
2L | Stal Dniprodzerzhynsk | 0
PL | Chornomorets Odesa | 4
1L | Bukovyna Chernivtsi | 0
PL | Arsenal Kyiv | 2
PL | Volyn Lutsk (a.e.t.) | 3
PL | Dnipro Dnipropetrovsk | 2
1L | Metalurh Zaporizhya | 3
PL | Vorskla Poltava | 0
PL | Dynamo Kyiv | 2
PL | Shakhtar Donetsk | 3

Quarterfinals
PL | Zorya Luhansk | 0
PL | Metalurh Donetsk (a.e.t.) | 1
PL | Karpaty Lviv | 2
PL | Chornomorets Odesa | 1
PL | Arsenal Kyiv | 0
PL | Volyn Lutsk (a.e.t.) | 1
1L | Metalurh Zaporizhya | 0
PL | Shakhtar Donetsk | 1

Semifinals
PL | Metalurh Donetsk (p) | 0 (7)
PL | Karpaty Lviv | 0 (6)
PL | Volyn Lutsk | 3
PL | Shakhtar Donetsk | 4

Final
PL | Metalurh Donetsk | 1
PL | Shakhtar Donetsk (a.e.t.) | 2

Notes:

- Result in parentheses is of penalty shootout.

== Competition schedule ==
=== First Preliminary Round (1/64) ===
In this round entered 18 clubs from the Druha Liha, the finalists of Ukrainian Amateur Cup. The round matches were played on July 16, 2011.

| 16 July 2011 | Dynamo Khmelnytskyi (2L) | 0 – 1 | (2L) Shakhtar Sverdlovsk | Khmelnytskyi |
| 18:00 LST | | Report | Korobkin 46' | Stadium: Podillia; Attendance: 700; Referee: Yaroslav Bits (Lviv) |

| 16 July 2011 | Real Pharm Yuzhne (2L) | 2 – 5 | (2L) Stal Dniprodzerzhynsk | Yuzhne, Odesa Oblast |
| 17:00 LST | Korolkov 49'; Kopko 50' | Report | Sakhniuk 2', 38'; Aliyev 17'; Shutov 75'; Savchenko 87' | Stadium: Shkilnyi; Attendance: 300; Referee: Oleksandr Moskalenko (Kyiv) |

| 16 July 2011 | Berehvydeyk Berehove (AM) | 1 – 0 | (2L) Krystal Kherson | Berehovo, Zakarpattia Oblast |
| 16:55 LST | Kalapach 31' | Report | | Stadium: Druzhba; Attendance: 3,000; Referee: Volodymyr Fedunets (Ternopil) |

| 16 July 2011 | Slavutych Cherkasy (2L) | 1 – 0 | (2L) Myr Hornostayivka | Cherkasy |
| 17:00 LST | Taran 57' | Report | | Stadium: Tsentralnyi; Attendance: 1,200; Referee: Dmytro Bondarenko (Odesa) |

| 16 July 2011 | UkrAhroKom Pryiutivka (2L) | 2 – 1 | (2L) Avanhard Kramatorsk | Holovkivka, Kirovohrad Oblast |
| 14:00 LST | Khrol 24', 88' (pen.) | Report | Shevchenko 62' (pen.) | Stadium: HOLovkivskyi; Attendance: 400; Referee: Anton Isayev (Zaporizhia) |

| 16 July 2011 | Hirnyk-Sport Komsomolsk (2L) | 1 – 1 (a.e.t.) (3–5 p) | (2L) Hirnyk Kryvyi Rih | Komsomolsk, Poltava Oblast |
| 17:00 LST | Sereda 18' | Report | Hryhoryk 84' | Stadium: Yunist; Attendance: 200; Referee: Dmytro Pikiner (Slovyansk) |
| | Penalties |
| | Rybka (penalty scored); Klekot (penalty missed); Lapa (penalty scored); Mishchenko (penalty scored) | | (penalty scored) Hurin; (penalty scored) Hvozdevych; (penalty scored) Sychov; (penalty scored) Chernik; (penalty scored) Davydenko |

| 16 July 2011 | SKAD-Yalpuh Bolhrad (2L) | 1 – 2 | (2L) Skala Stryi | Bahate, Odesa Oblast |
| 17:25 LST | Oliynyk 38' | Report | Skotskyi 8', 75' | Stadium: Dunai; Attendance: 500; Referee: Roman Kalyta (Kirovohrad) |

| 16 July 2011 | Bastion Illichivsk (2L) | bye^{(1)} | (2L) Makiyivvuhillya Makiyivka |
| | | Report |

| 16 July 2011 | Slovkhlib Slovyansk (AM) | bye^{(2)} | (2L) Zhytychi Zhytomyr |
| | | Report |

| 16 July 2011 | Desna Chernihiv (2L) | bye^{(3)} | (2L) Nyva Ternopil |
| | | Report |

Notes:

^(1) Makiyivvuhillya Makiyivka were drawn to play away against Bastion Illichivsk but they withdrew from the professional ranks prior to the start of the 2011–12 season. Makiyivvuhillya Makiyivka received a bye.

^(2) Slovkhlib Slovyansk were drawn to play at home against Zhytychi Zhytomyr but they failed attestation and were not admitted to the PFL. Slovkhlib Slovyansk received a bye.

^(3) Desna Chernihiv were drawn to play at home against Nyva Ternopil but they withdrew from the Cup competition having not completed attestation awaiting their status in the PFL. Desna Chernihiv received a bye.

=== Second Preliminary Round (1/32) ===
In this round entered all 17 clubs from Persha Liha (except Dynamo-2 Kyiv) and the higher seeded 5 clubs and those clubs which received byes from the Druha Liha. They were drawn against the 7 winners of the First Preliminary Round. The second round matches were played on August 17, 2011.

| 16 August 2011 | Bukovyna Chernivtsi (1L) | 3 – 2 | (1L) Olimpik Donetsk | Chernivtsi |
| 16:00 LST | Artemenko 12'; Hunchak 86', 88' | Report | Holovchenko 49', 78' | Stadium: Bukovyna; Attendance: 2,500; Referee: Oleksandr Bondar (Khmelnytskyi) |

| 17 August 2011 | Tytan Armyansk (1L) | +/- (3 – 0)^{(5)} | (1L) Nyva Vinnytsia |
| | | Report |

| 17 August 2011 | UkrAhroKom Pryiutivka (2L) | 0 – 1 (a.e.t.) | (1L) Metalurh Zaporizhya | Holovkivka, Kirovohrad Oblast |
| 17:00 LST | | Report | Tsurikov 92' | Stadium: HOLovkivskyi; Attendance: 650; Referee: Mykola Balakin (Kyiv) |

| 17 August 2011 | Shakhtar Sverdlovsk (2L) | 4 – 1 | (2L) Slavutych Cherkasy | Sverdlovsk, Luhansk Oblast |
| 17:00 LST | Korobkin 30'; Bermudes 36'; Skarlosh 67'; Perin 80' | Report | Tarasenko 46' | Stadium: imeni Horyushkina; Attendance: 2,500; Referee: Roman Kalyta (Kirovohrad) |

| 17 August 2011 | Stal Alchevsk (1L) | 0 – 1 | (1L) FC Sevastopol | Alchevsk, Luhansk Oblast |
| 19:00 LST | | Report | Tarasenko 46' | Stadium: Stal; Attendance: 1,425; Referee: Andriy Kuzmin (Mykolaiv) |

| 17 August 2011 | Slovkhlib Slovyansk (AM) | 1 – 0 | (1L) FC Odesa | Slovyansk, Donetsk Oblast |
| 17:00 LST | Fomych 90+1' | Report | | Stadium: Khimik; Attendance: 1,000; Referee: Volodymyr Novokhatniy (Kyiv) |

| 17 August 2011 | Prykarpattya Ivano-Frankivsk (2L) | 1 – 2 | (2L) FC Poltava | Ivano-Frankivsk |
| 18:00 LST | Boryshkevych 41' (pen.); Boryshkevych (yellow card) 52' (yellow-red card) 83' | Report | Skorokhod 13', 21' | Stadium: Rukh; Attendance: 1,000; Referee: Oleksiy Derevinskyi (Kyiv) |

| 17 August 2011 | Desna Chernihiv (2L) | 0 – 2 | (1L) Enerhetyk Burshtyn | Chernihiv |
| 18:00 LST | | Report | Semenyna 40'; Furta 79' | Stadium: imeni Haharyna; Attendance: 1,100; Referee: Andriy Kutakov (Brovary) |

| 17 August 2011 | Stal Dniprodzerzhynsk (2L) | 1 – 0 | (2L) Makiyivvuhillya Makiyivka | Dniprodzerzhynsk, Dnipropetrovsk Oblast |
| 17:00 LST | Aliyev 34' | Report | | Stadium: Metalurh; Attendance: 800; Referee: Volodymyr Milanych (Mykolaiv) |

| 17 August 2011 | Hoverla-Zakarpattya Uzhhorod (1L) | 1 – 0 | (1L) Helios Kharkiv | Uzhhorod |
| 16:30 LST | Kucherenko 90+1' | Report | Kikot (yellow card) 54' (yellow-red card) 90+2' | Stadium: Avanhard; Attendance: 800; Referee: Ivan Bondar (Kyiv) |

| 17 August 2011 | Kremin Kremenchuk (2L) | 2 – 0 | (2L) Hirnyk Kryvyi Rih | Kremenchuk, Poltava Oblast |
| 17:00 LST | Misyailo 29'; Vovchenko 36' | Report | | Stadium: Kremin Arena; Attendance: 1,500; Referee: Denys Shurman (Vyshneve) |

| 17 August 2011 | Skala Stryi (2L) | 0 – 2 | (1L) Arsenal Bila Tserkva | Stryi, Lviv Oblast |
| 17:00 LST | | Report | Kostyuk 23', 51' | Stadium: Sokil; Attendance: 800; Referee: Mykhailo Mytrovskyi (Uzhhorod) |

| 17 August 2011 | Berehvydeyk Berehove (AM) | 1 – 0 | (1L) Naftovyk-Ukrnafta Okhtyrka | Berehovo, Zakarpattia Oblast |
| 17:00 LST | Teplyi 15'; Azarov (red card) 74' | Report | | Stadium: Druzhba; Attendance: 2,000; Referee: Yuriy Suryak (Lviv) |

| 17 August 2011 | FC Sumy (2L) | 3 – 1 | (1L) Krymteplytsya Molodizhne | Sumy |
| 19:00 LST | Melnyk 39'; Shymko 53' (pen.); Kovalchuk 69' | Report | Falkovskyi 79' | Stadium: Yuvileinyi; Attendance: 5,200; Referee: Serhiy Skyrda (Kharkiv) |

| 17 August 2011 | FC Lviv (1L) | 1 – 3 | (1L) Zirka Kirovohrad | Dobromyl, Lviv Oblast |
| 17:00 LST | Chapko 66' | Report | Kochura 1' (pen.); Durai 59'; Gulordava 88' | Stadium: Lafort Arena; Attendance: 150; Referee: Andriy Yablonskyi (Ternopil) |

| 17 August 2011 | Enerhiya Nova Kakhovka (2L) | 0 – 4 | (1L) MFC Mykolaiv | Nova Kakhovka, Kherson Oblast |
| 17:00 LST | | Report | Hudzikevych 24'; Brovkin 49'; Lishchuk 70'; Tarasenko 81' | Stadium: Enerhiya; Attendance: 3,100; Referee: Pavlo Chyzhevskyi (Kyiv) |

Note: ^(5) Match not played. Nyva Vinnytsia informed the PFL that the club was having financial difficulties and would not arrive for the scheduled cup game against Tytan Armyansk.

=== Round of 32 ===
In this round all 16 teams from the Premier League enter the competition. They and the 16 winners from the previous round consisting of nine clubs from the First League, five clubs from the Second League, and both representatives from the amateur league are drawn in this round. The draw took place September 8, 2011 and was performed by Anatoliy Kon'kov who was invited as a guest by the Premier League. The matches were played September 21, 2011.

| 21 September 2011 | Tytan Armyansk (1L) | 0–1 | (PL) Dnipro Dnipropetrovsk | Armyansk, Crimea |
| 15:00 LST | | Report (uk) | Matheus 69' | Stadium: Khimik; Attendance: 2,100; Referee: Hennadiy Makhno |

| 21 September 2011 | FC Poltava (2L) | 0–1 | (PL) Karpaty Lviv | Poltava |
| 15:30 LST | | Report (uk) | Gómez 73' | Stadium: Lokomotyv; Attendance: 2,500; Referee: Ivan Bondar |

| 21 September 2011 | Shakhtar Sverdlovsk (2L) | 0–2 | (PL) Shakhtar Donetsk | Sverdlovsk, Luhansk Oblast |
| 15:30 LST | | Report (uk) | Alan 31'; Moreno 42' | Stadium: imeni Hariushkina; Attendance: 7,750; Referee: Serhiy Skrypak |

| 21 September 2011 | Kremin Kremenchuk (2L) | 2–3 | (PL) Dynamo Kyiv | Kremenchuk, Poltava Oblast |
| 16:00 LST | Sumtsov 60'; Vovchenko 88' | Report (uk) | Rybalka 14'; Adi 15'; Dudu 46' | Stadium: Kremin Arena; Attendance: 2,200; Referee: Konstiantyn Trukhanov |

| 21 September 2011 | Berehvydeyk Berehove (AM) | 0–3 | (PL) Metalist Kharkiv | Berehove, Zakarpattia Oblast |
| 16:00 LST | | Report (uk) | Cristaldo 44'; Tkachyov 45+1'; Budnik 74' | Stadium: Druzhba; Attendance: 5,000; Referee: Andriy Kuzmin |

| 21 September 2011 | Stal Dniprodzerzhynsk (2L) | 2–1 | (1L) PFC Sevastopol | Dniprodzerzhynsk, Dnipropetrovsk Oblast |
| 16:00 LST | Aliev 23'; Haranyan 44' | Report (uk) | Chepurnenko 13' | Stadium: Metalurh; Attendance: 2,200; Referee: Serhiy Skyrda |

| 21 September 2011 | Bukovyna Chernivtsi (1L) | 2–1 | (PL) Obolon Kyiv | Chernivtsi |
| 16:00 LST | Basov 23'; Semenyuk 52' | Report (uk) | Barylko 65' | Stadium: Bukovyna; Attendance: 9,125; Referee: Oleksandr Bilokur |

| 21 September 2011 | Slovkhlib Slovyansk (AM) | 0–2 | (PL) Zorya Luhansk | Sloviansk, Donetsk Oblast |
| 16:00 LST | | Report (uk) | Lipartia 16'; Bilyi 46' | Stadium: Khimik; Attendance: 4,800; Referee: Andriy Kutakov |

| 21 September 2011 | MFK Mykolaiv (1L) | 0–2 | (PL) Vorskla Poltava | Mykolaiv |
| 16:00 LST | | Report (uk) | Hromov 40'; Osypenko 56' | Stadium: Tsentralnyi; Attendance: 8,000; Referee: Andriy His'ko |

| 21 September 2011 | Enerhetyk Burshtyn (1L) | 0–1 | (PL) Chornomorets Odesa | Burshtyn, Ivano-Frankivsk Oblast |
| 16:30 LST | | Report (uk) | Fontanello 31' | Stadium: Enerhetyk; Attendance: 2,800; Referee: Oleksandr Bondar |

| 21 September 2011 | Arsenal Bila Tserkva (1L) | 2 – 3 (a.e.t.) | (PL) Kryvbas Kryvyi Rih | Bila Tserkva, Kyiv Oblast |
| 16:30 LST | Slavov 11'; Leonov 73' | Report (uk) | Valeyev 45+1'; Bartulović 83'; Fedorchuk 120' | Stadium: Trudovi Rezervy; Attendance: 5,000; Referee: Vitaliy Dyadenko |

| 21 September 2011 | Arsenal Kyiv (PL) | 5–0 | (PL) PFC Oleksandria | Kyiv^{(6)} |
| 17:00 LST | Maksymov 45', 52'; Homenyuk 66'; Mikoliūnas 85'; Shatskikh 90+3' | Report (uk) | | Stadium: Obolon Arena; Attendance: 3,446; Referee: Oleksandr Ivanov |

| 21 September 2011 | FC Sumy (2L) | 1 – 1 (a.e.t.) (3 – 2 p) | (1L) Zirka Kirovohrad | Sumy |
| 18:00 LST | Mel'nyk 82' | Report (uk) | Hololobov 54' | Stadium: Yuvileiny; Attendance: 5,100; Referee: Oleksiy Drachov |
| | Penalties |
| | Kotelyukh (penalty missed); Melnyk (penalty scored); Bohachov (penalty scored); Shymko (penalty scored); Pukas (penalty missed) | | (penalty missed) Kryzhanivskyi; (penalty scored) Rudnytskyi; (penalty scored) Batalskyi; (penalty missed) Shybko; (penalty missed) Sklyar |

| 21 September 2011 | Metalurh Donetsk (PL) | 2–0 | (PL) Tavriya Simferopol | Donetsk |
| 18:30 LST | Soares 14'; Mário Sérgio 40' | Report (uk) | | Stadium: Metalurh; Attendance: 2,000; Referee: Mykhailo Rodionenko |

| 21 September 2011 | Volyn Lutsk (PL) | 7–1 | (PL) Illichivets Mariupol | Lutsk |
| 19:00 LST | Skoba 19'; Maicon 41', 68'; Maslo 58'; Ramon 67', 74'; Sharpar 89' | Report (uk) | Okriashvili 62' | Stadium: Avanhard; Attendance: 3,200; Referee: Yaroslav Kozyk |

| 21 September 2011 | Metalurh Zaporizhya (1L) | 1–0 | (1L) Hoverla-Zakarpattia Uzhhorod | Zaporizhia |
| 19:00 LST | Matheus 64' | Report (uk) | | Stadium: Slavutych Arena; Attendance: 6,000; Referee: Andriy Lisakovskiy |

Note:

^(6) Arsenal Kyiv had been using Lobanovskyi Dynamo Stadium as a home ground during the season moved their cup game to Obolon Arena.

=== Round of 16 ===
In this round enter winners from the previous round. The Premier League is represented with 12 clubs, the First League – 2, and the Second League – 2. The draw took place October 13, 2011 and was performed by the former Metalist Kharkiv player Ihor Yakubovskiy, who was invited as a guest by the Premier League. The matches were played October 26, 2011. Last season's Cup final participants Dynamo Kyiv and Shakhtar Donets'k were drawn to play against each other in this round with the Cup holders prevailing.

| 26 October 2011 | Stal Dniprodzerzhynsk (2L) | 0–4 | (PL) Chornomorets Odesa | Dniprodzerzhynsk, Dnipropetrovsk Oblast |
| 11:00 LST | | Report (uk) | Ţîgîrlaş 11', 32'; Fontanello 35' de Matos 69' | Stadium: Metalurh Stadium; Attendance: 2,500; Referee: Konstiantyn Trukhanov |

| 26 October 2011 | Bukovyna Chernivtsi (1L) | 0–2 | (PL) Arsenal Kyiv | Chernivtsi |
| 14:00 LST | | Report (uk) | Mazilu 67', 90+1' | Stadium: Bukovyna Stadium; Attendance: 10,000; Referee: Vitaliy Dyadenko |

| 26 October 2011 | Metalurh Donetsk (PL) | 4–0 | (PL) Kryvbas Kryvyi Rih | Donetsk |
| 17:30 LST | Checher 12'; Mário Sérgio 42' (pen.); Traoré 55', 73' | Report (uk) | | Stadium: Metalurh Stadium; Attendance: 1,500; Referee: Yuriy Mozharovskiy |

| 26 October 2011 | Volyn Lutsk (PL) | 3 – 2 (a.e.t.) | (PL) Dnipro Dnipropetrovsk | Lutsk |
| 18:00 LST | Goeber 17'; Sharpar 82'; Ramon 92' (pen.) | Report (uk) | Konoplianka 36' (pen.); Zozulya 38' | Stadium: Avanhard Stadium; Attendance: 7,580; Referee: Serhiy Lysenchuk |

| 26 October 2011 | FC Sumy (2L) | 1–3 | (PL) Zorya Luhansk | Sumy |
| 19:00 LST | Hrachov 14' | Report (uk) | Lazarovych 36'; Silyuk 74'; Milko 90+4' | Stadium: Yuvileiny Stadium; Attendance: 8,750; Referee: Ivan Bodnar |

| 26 October 2011 | Metalurh Zaporizhya (1L) | 3–0 | (PL) Vorskla Poltava | Zaporizhia |
| 19:00 LST | Junior 26'; Rudyka 63'; Pisotskyi 85' | Report (uk) | | Stadium: Slavutych Arena; Attendance: 7,200; Referee: Andriy Kuz'min |

| 26 October 2011 | Karpaty Lviv (PL) | 1–0 | (PL) Metalist Kharkiv | Lviv |
| 20:00 LST | Milošević 59' | Report (uk) | | Stadium: Ukraina Stadium; Attendance: 27,000; Referee: Serhiy Dankovskiy |

| 26 October 2011 | Dynamo Kyiv (PL) | 2–3 | (PL) Shakhtar Donetsk | Kyiv |
| 20:15 LST | Yarmolenko 41'; Milevskyi 90+4' | Report (uk) | Eduardo 9', 88'; Teixeira 31' | Stadium: Lobanovsky Dynamo Stadium; Attendance: 16,000; Referee: Anatoliy Abdula |

=== Quarterfinals ===
In this round enter the winners from the previous round. The Premier League will be represented with 7 clubs and the First League with 1 club. The draw took place March 15, 2012 and was performed by former Dynamo and Ukraine national team coach Yozhef Sabo. The matches were played April 11, 2012.

| 11 April 2012 | Metalurh Zaporizhya (1L) | 0–1 | (PL) Shakhtar Donetsk | Zaporizhia |
| 17:00 LST | | Report | Mkhitaryan 79' | Stadium: Slavutych Arena; Attendance: 11,700; Referee: Andriy Kuzman |

| 11 April 2012 | Arsenal Kyiv (PL) | 0–1 (a.e.t.) | (PL) Volyn Lutsk | Kyiv |
| 18:00 LST | Shatskikh (penalty missed) 62'; Odibe (red card) 104' | Report | Maicon 103' | Stadium: Lobanovsky Dynamo Stadium; Attendance: 2,895; Referee: Dmytro Zhukov |

| 11 April 2012 | Zorya Luhansk (PL) | 0–1 (a.e.t.) | (PL) Metalurh Donetsk | Luhansk |
| 19:30 LST | | Report | Idahor 108' (o.g.) | Stadium: Avanhard Stadium; Attendance: 12,000; Referee: Kostyantyn Trukhanov |

| 11 April 2012 | Karpaty Lviv (PL) | 2–1 | (PL) Chornomorets Odesa | Lviv |
| 20:00 LST | Hladkyi 8'; Danilo Avelar 71' | Report | Kutas (yellow card) 44' (yellow-red card) 58'; Politylo (yellow card) 22' (red card) 73'; Bakaj 83' | Stadium: Ukraina Stadium; Attendance: 18,500; Referee: Oleksandr Ivanov |

=== Semifinals ===
In this round enter the winners from the previous round. All participants represent the Premier League. The draw took place April 12, 2012 and performed by the Ukrainian referee Viktor Derdo. The winner of the match Metalurh-Karpaty will host the final of the Ukrainian Cup.

| 27 April 2012 | Volyn Lutsk (PL) | 3–4 | (PL) Shakhtar Donetsk | Lutsk |
| 19:00 LST | Maicon 35' (pen.), 90+2'; Ramon 84' | Report | Teixeira 24'; Fernandinho 37' (pen.); Adriano 60' (pen.); Douglas Costa 90' | Stadium: Avanhard Stadium; Attendance: 12,080; Referee: Vitaliy Hodulyan |

| 28 April 2012 | Metalurh Donetsk (PL) | 0 – 0 (a.e.t.) (7 – 6 p) | (PL) Karpaty Lviv | Donetsk |
| 18:30 LST | Morozyuk (penalty missed) 119 | Report | Hirskyi (red card) 120' | Stadium: Metalurh Stadium; Attendance: 3,600; Referee: Yuriy Moseichuk |
| | Penalties |
| | Danilo (penalty scored); Ghazaryan (penalty scored); China (penalty scored); Mkrtchyan (penalty missed); Volovyk (penalty scored); Pryima (penalty scored); Morozyuk (penalty scored); Ivanko (penalty scored) | | (penalty scored) Kasyan; (penalty missed) Tkachuk; (penalty scored) Avelar; (penalty scored) Pérez; (penalty scored) Fedetskyi; (penalty scored) Khudobyak; (penalty scored) Kopolovets; (penalty missed) Milošević |

=== Final ===
In this round enter the winners from the previous round. All participants represent the Premier League. The Cup Final will be played May 6, 2012.

6 May 2012
19:30 EEST

| Metalurh Donetsk (PL) | 1 – 2 (a.e.t.) | (PL) Shakhtar Donetsk |
|---|---|---|
| Morozyuk 68' | Report | Teixeira 23'; Kucher 104' |

NSC Olimpiyskiy, Kyiv
Attendance: 47,314
Referee: Anatoliy Abdula (Kharkiv)

== Top goalscorers ==
The data includes goals scored in qualifying matches as well as the rounds since the Round of 32.

| Scorer | Goals | Team |
|---|---|---|
| (Brazil) Maicon Pereira | 5 (1) | Volyn Lutsk |
| (Brazil) Ramon Lopes | 4 (1) | Volyn Lutsk |
| (Ukraine) Seykhan Aliyev | 3 | Stal Dniprodzerzhynsk |
| (Ukraine) Hryhoriy Haranyan | 3 | Stal Dniprodzerzhynsk |
| (Brazil) Alex Teixeira | 3 | Shakhtar Donetsk |

== See also ==
- 2011–12 Ukrainian Premier League
- 2011–12 Ukrainian First League
- 2011–12 Ukrainian Second League
- 2011–12 UEFA Europa League
