= Dmytro Kara-Mustafa =

Ukrainian footballer

Personal information
- Full name: Dmytro Oleksiyovych Kara-Mustafa
- Date of birth: 30 October 1972 (age 53)
- Place of birth: Krasnodon, Soviet Union (now Ukraine)
- Height: 1.82 m (6 ft 0 in)
- Position: Midfielder

Team information
- Current team: Kryvbas Kryvyi Rih (assistant)

Senior career*
Years	Team	Apps	(Gls)
1990–1991	Zorya Luhansk	10	(0)
1990–1991	→ Shakhtar Sverdlovsk (loan)	8+	(2)
1992	Shakhtar Sverdlovsk	10	(1)
1992–1994	Zorya-MALS Luhansk	29	(2)
1994–1995	Dynamo Luhansk	29	(2)
1995–1996	Metalurh Mariupol	25	(6)
1996–1997	Zorya Luhansk	18	(0)
1997–1998	Metalurh Mariupol	6	(0)
1998	Shakhtyor Shakhty	12	(0)
1998–2004	Shakhtar Sverdlovsk	100	(26)

Managerial career
- 2003–2009: Shakhtar Sverdlovsk
- 2010: Olkom Melitopol
- 2011–2016: Zorya Luhansk (scout)
- 2016–2019: Zorya Luhansk (youth)
- 2019–2020: Shakhtyor Soligorsk (assistant)
- 2021–2022: Sheriff Tiraspol (assistant)
- 2022–: Kryvbas Kryvyi Rih (assistant)
- * Club domestic league appearances and goals as of 26 June 2022

Dmytro Oleksiyovych Kara-Mustafa (Ukrainian: Дмитро Олексійович Кара-Мустафа; born 30 October 1972) is a Ukrainian retired professional footballer who played as a midfielder and current assistant coach at Kryvbas Kryvyi Rih.

== Honours ==
=== Player ===
Metalurh Mariupol

- Ukrainian Second League, Group B: 1995–96

Shakhtar Sverdlovsk

- Luhansk Oblast Championship: 1998, 2002; runner-up: 2004
- Luhansk Oblast Cup: 2004

=== Manager ===
Shakhtar Sverdlovsk

- Ukrainian Amateur League: 2006
- Luhansk Oblast Championship: 2005, 2006; runner-up: 2004
- Luhansk Oblast Cup: 2005
