= 2011–12 Ukrainian Second League =

Ukrainian Second League
- Season: 2011–12
- Country: Ukraine
- Teams: 28
- Champions: FC Sumy
- Promoted: FC Sumy; FC Poltava; Avanhard Kramatorsk
- Relegated: ~~SKAD-Yalpuh Bolhrad~~ (withdrew); ~~Chornomorets-2 Odesa~~ (withdrew); ~~Metalurh-2 Zaporizhzhia~~ (withdrew); ~~Illichivets-2 Mariupol~~ (withdrew); ~~Dnipro-2 Dnipropetrovsk~~ (expelled); ~~Prykarpattia Ivano-Frankivsk~~ (expelled)
- Matches: 324
- Goals: 862 (2.66 per match)
- Top goalscorer: 12 goals Yuriy Kolomoyets (Hirnyk); Yevhen Radionov (FC Poltava)
- Biggest home win: Enerhiya 8–0 Real Pharm (Round 24)
- Biggest away win: 4 games – Makiyivvuhillya 0–5 FC Poltava (Round 3); Yednist' 1–6 Prykarpattya (Round 5); SKAD-Yalpuh 0–5 Skala (Round 7); SKAD-Yalpuh 1–6 Prykarpattya (Round 11)
- Highest scoring: Shakhtar-3 7–2 Sevastopol-2 (Round 2)
- Longest winning run: 8 – Kremin (Round 11–18), Desna (Round 15–22)
- Longest unbeaten run: 21 – Desna (Round 2–22)
- Longest losing run: 12 – Makiyivvuhillya (Round 2–3, 5–7, ppd. 1, 8–9, ppd. 4, 10–12)
- Highest attendance: 11,300 – FC Sumy–Real Pharm (Round 26)
- Lowest attendance: 20 – Shakhtar-3–Stal (Round 18)

The 2011–12 Ukrainian Second League was the 21st season of 3rd level professional football in Ukraine. There are two groups of competition divided by region. Both Group competitions began on 23 July 2011. The competition had a winter break from 6 November 2012 and until 2 April 2012. The group competitions completed on 28 May 2012. The championship game was played between the top teams of each group competition on 2 June 2012.

== Competition information ==
Note: Relegation from the League is not covered by the current regulations

The placing of teams in the table is done in the following order:

- number of accumulated points
- difference(GD) between goals for(GF) and goals allowed(GA)
- number of goals for
- The League Fair-play ranking

The next tie-break is a simple draw.

== Teams ==
=== Admitted teams ===
The following teams were admitted by the PFL after playing at the 2011 Ukrainian Football Amateur League and passing attestation.

- Krystal Kherson – initial group stage (returning after an absence of five seasons)
- FC Sevastopol-2 Sevastopol – UPL youth competitions (returning after an absence of three seasons)
- Makiyivvuhillya Makiyivka – initial group stage (debut)
- Myr Hornostayivka – initial group stage (debut)
- Real Pharm Yuzhne – initial group stage (debut)
- SKAD-Yalpuh Bolhrad – initial group stage (debut)
- UkrAhroKom Pryiutivka – initial group stage (debut)
- Slavutych Cherkasy – initial group stage (debut)
- Avanhard Kramatorsk – initial group stage (returning after an absence of 42 seasons, since 1969)

=== Relegated teams ===
- Prykarpattya Ivano-Frankivsk – (returning after an absence of four seasons)
  - FSC Prykarpattia Ivano-Frankivsk is regarded a successor of FC Fakel Ivano-Frankivsk.

=== Location map ===
Locations of team home grounds in Ukrainian Second League 2011–12

== Group A ==
Club	Stadium	Capacity
Desna Chernihiv	Gagarin Stadium	12,060
Dynamo Khmelnytsky	SC Podillia	8,000
Enerhiya Nova Kakhovka	Enerhiya Stadium	4,000
Yednist Plysky	Yednist Stadium	1,500
Krystal Kherson	Krystal Stadium	2,000
Nyva Ternopil	City Stadium	15,150
Prykarpattia Ivano-Frankivsk	Rukh Stadium	6,500
Real Farm Yuzhne	City Stadium	3,000
SKAD-Yalpuh Bolhrad	Dunai Stadium	?
Skala Stryi	Sokil Stadium	6,000
Slavutych Cherkasy	Central Stadium	10,321
Sumy	Yuvileiny Stadium	25,800
Ukrahrokom Pryiutivka	Holovkivsky Stadium	580
Chornomorets-2 Odesa	SC Lustdorf	500

=== Standings ===
Pos	Team	Pld	W	D	L	GF	GA	GD	Pts	Promotion or relegation
1	FC Sumy	26	21	3	2	51	13	+38	66	Promoted to First League
2	Desna Chernihiv	26	18	5	3	48	19	+29	59	Qualified for playoff
3	Slavutych Cherkasy	26	15	8	3	35	15	+20	53	
4	Enerhiya Nova Kakhovka	26	15	7	4	50	17	+33	52	
5	UkrAhroKom Pryiutivka	26	14	6	6	43	25	+18	48	
6	Prykarpattya Ivano-Frankivsk	26	11	6	9	40	32	+8	33 (Note: Prykarpattya Ivano-Frankivsk were docked a total of 6 points due to failure of payment to former team players. Initially the club were given 18 months to satisfy the PFL decision but failed to do so and had three points. (3 November 2011) The club was docked another three points at the end of the season for failure to resolve their financial obligations. (31 May 2012) The club attempted to pass attestation for the next season. (6 June 2012) However they were expelled from the PFL when they were not included in the draw for the first round of the next season. (10 July 2012))	Expelled
7	Real Pharm Yuzhne	26	9	6	11	28	41	−13	33	
8	Krystal Kherson	26	9	5	12	30	32	−2	32	
9	Skala Stryi	26	8	4	14	26	36	−10	28	
10	Dynamo Khmelnytskyi	26	6	4	16	23	50	−27	22	
11	Chornomorets-2 Odesa	26	5	5	16	19	20	−1	20	Withdrew (Note: Chornomorets-2 Odesa withdrew from the PFL during the mid-winter break. (11 January 2012))
12	Nyva Ternopil	26	9	6	11	30	41	−11	18 (Note: Nyva Ternopil were docked a total of 15 points due to failure of payment to former team players that played between 2007–10.(28 September 2011) An additional 6 points were deducted for continuing not to resolve the first issue by 15 November 2011.(27 October 2011) An additional 6 points were deducted for not resolving this issue by the Disciplinary Committee of the Ukrainian Football Federation.(15 December 2011))	
13	Yednist' Plysky	26	3	6	17	19	57	−38	15	
14	SKAD-Yalpuh Bolhrad	26	2	1	23	10	54	−44	7	Withdrew (Note: SKAD-Yalpuh Bolhrad withdrew from the PFL prior to the start of the spring session. (4 April 2012))

==== Withdrawn Teams ====
===== Chornomorets-2 Odesa =====
On 7 January the Football Club Chornomorets Odesa informed the PFL that they ceased operations of their third team Chornomorets-2 Odesa and withdrew it from the League during the mid-winter break (after Round 16). The PFL officially acknowledged the communication from the club on 11 January 2012. All of their spring fixtures are considered technical losses. The club played sixteen games in the League and had a record of 5 wins, 5 draws and 6 losses with 19 goals scored and 20 allowed.

===== SKAD-Yalpuh Bolhrad =====
On 4 April the PFL removed SKAD-Yalpuh Bolhrad from the competition due to deficient financial funding of the club. All of their spring fixtures are considered technical losses. The club played sixteen games in the League and had a record of 2 wins, 1 draws and 13 losses with 10 goals scored and 54 allowed.

=== Results ===
As of May 25, 2012

Home \ Away	CH2	DES	DKH	ENK	KRK	NVT	PIF	RPY	SYB	SKS	SLC	SUM	UAP	YEP
Chornomorets-2 Odesa		-:+	1–1	0–2	-:+	1–0	-:+	1–1	-:-	-:+	2–3	0–1	2–1	2–1
Desna Chernihiv	1–0		2–0	1–2	1–0	1–0	2–0	2–0	4–0	1–0	1–1	2–1	1–4	5–1
Dynamo Khmelnytskyi	+:-	0–2		0–1	0–2	2–3	0–1	2–0	1–0	1–1	0–2	1–1	1–3	5–1
Enerhiya Nova Kakhovka	1–1	0–1	3–2		4–0	4–0	3–1	8–0	3–0	2–1	2–2	0–0	1–2	3–0
Krystal Kherson	2–2	1–4	1–2	0–0		2–1	1–2	0–1	5–0	2–1	0–0	1–2	3–1	3–0
Nyva Ternopil	+:-	1–3	4–0	2–1	2–1		1–1	0–0	1–1	1–0	1–1	0–3 (Note: The Round 3 match was not played due to a flooded pitch cause by severe flooding in the region. (July 30, 2011) The Appellate Committee of the Football Federation of Ukraine ruled against rescheduling of the fixture as well as fining Nyva Ternopil 5,000 hrv. PFL Disciplinary committee awards a 3–0 technical victory to FC Sumy. (November 14, 2011))	1–0	0–0
Prykarpattya Ivano-Frankivsk	1–0	2–2	6–2	1–1	1–0	2–3		0–0	+:-	2–1	0–3	1–3	3–0	0–0
Real Pharm Yuzhne	+:-	1–2	2–1	1–4	1–0	4–2	1–0		5–0	3–1	0–1	2–2	0–1	1–4
SKAD-Yalpuh Bolhrad	0–3 (Note: PFL Disciplinary committee awards a 3–0 technical victory to Chornormorets-2 Odesa after it was found that SKAD-Yalpuh Bolhrad fielded V. Lebedynsky without the proper documentation. (September 7, 2011) Original Round 5 match was a 2–0 victory for SKAD-Yalpuh Bolhrad.)	0–4	-:+	-:+	-:+	1–4	1–6	2–1		0–5	0–1	-:+	-:+	3–1
Skala Stryi	0–1	0–3	0–0	0–2	3–3	4–3	1–0	2–2	+:-		0–1	0–1	1–0 (Note: One Round 2 fixture was postponed for a day due to the mining disaster at the Suhodolskaya-Vostochnaya coal mine when a day of mourning was announced by the President of Ukraine. (30 July 2011))	1–0
Slavutych Cherkasy	3–1	1–1	1–0	0–0	1–0	3–0	2–1	0–0	+:-	3–2		1–2	0–1	4–0
PFC Sumy	+:-	2–0	6–1	2–0	1–0	3–0 (Note: For the Round 15 fixture Nyva Ternopil did not arrive for the game. The PFL Disciplinary committee awards a 3–0 technical victory to FC Sumy. (November 3, 2011))	2–1	1–0 (Note: High attendance of 11,300 between FC Sumy–Real Pharm (Round 26))	6–0	3–0	1–0		0–1	3–1
UkrAhroKom Holovkivka	+:-	1–1	3–0	1–1	2–2	3–0	2–2	5–0	4–2	1–0	1–1	1–2		5–1
Yednist' Plysky	2–2	1–1	4–1	0–3	0–1	0–0	1–6	0–2	+:-	1–2	0–1	0–3	0–0 (Note: Round 17 fixture was moved to Bannikov Stadium in Kyiv due to flooding at Yednist's home ground.)	

Updated to match(es) played on 25 May 2012. Source: PFL Druha Liha A Calendar
Legend: Blue = home team win; Yellow = draw; Red = away team win.

=== Top scorers ===
As of May 25, 2012

	Scorer	Goals (Pen.)	Team
1	(Ukraine) Andriy Barladym	10	Krystal Kherson
2	(Ukraine) Ruslan Ivashko (Note: Ruslan Ivashko during the winter break signed a contract with Ukrainian First League club Enerhetyk Burshtyn)	9	Prykarpattya Ivano-Frankivsk
2	(Ukraine) Ihor Melnyk	9	FC Sumy
2	(Ukraine) Denys Ryzhenko	9 (1)	Enerhiya Nova Kakhovka
5	(Ukraine) Roman Poltavets	8	Desna Chernihiv
5	(Ukraine) Mykhaylo Serhiychuk	8	Slavutych Cherkasy
5	(Ukraine) Oleksiy Mazurenko	8 (4)	Krystal Kherson

== Group B ==
Stadium	Capacity	Club
RSC Olimpiysky	26,100	Avanhard / Shakhtar
Avanhard Stadium	4,000	Avanhard Kramatorsk
Avanhard Stadium	5,400	Makiyivvuhillia Makiivka
Zhovtneva Mine Stadium	2,500	Hirnyk Kryvyi Rih
Metalurh Stadium (Yenakieve)	5,500	Makiyivvuhillia Makiivka
Yunist Stadium	2,500	Hirnyk-Sport Komsomolsk
Meteor Stadium	24,321	Dnipro-2 Dnipropetrovsk
Azovets Stadium	1,660	Illichivets-2 Mariupol
SC Kremin	1,500	Kremin Kremenchuk
Shakhtar Academy	1,000	Makiyivvuhillia Makiivka
Tytan Stadium	2,000	Metalurh-2 Zaporizhzhia
Zatys Stadium	500	Myr Hornostayivka
Lokomotyv Stadium	2,500	Poltava
Kolos Stadium	1,000	Sevastopol-2
Metalurh Stadium	2,900	Stal Dniprodzerzhynsk
Kirsha Training Center	1,500	Shakhtar-3 Donetsk
Horiushkin Stadium	10,000	Shakhtar Sverdlovsk

=== Standings ===
Pos	Team	Pld	W	D	L	GF	GA	GD	Pts	Promotion or relegation
1	FC Poltava	26	18	5	3	50	18	+32	59	Promoted to First League
2	Avanhard Kramatorsk	26	19	1	6	41	15	+26	58	Qualified for playoff Promoted to First League
3	Shakhtar Sverdlovsk	26	15	6	5	49	23	+26	51	
4	Hirnyk Kryvyi Rih	26	16	3	7	44	22	+22	51	
5	Kremin Kremenchuk	26	16	3	7	34	23	+11	51	
6	Stal Dniprodzerzhynsk	26	15	3	8	34	19	+15	48	
7	Myr Hornostayivka	26	13	7	6	36	26	+10	46	
8	Shakhtar-3 Donetsk	26	10	1	15	45	56	−11	31	
9	Hirnyk-Sport Komsomolsk	26	6	8	12	28	39	−11	26	
10	FC Sevastopol-2	26	7	3	16	26	51	−25	24	
11	Dnipro-2 Dnipropetrovsk	26	6	5	15	24	42	−18	23	Expelled (Note: Dnipro-2 Dnipropetrovsk was expelled from the PFL after failing to play their Round 26 fixture against Makiyivvuhillya. (6 June 2012))
12	Metalurh-2 Zaporizhzhia	26	5	3	18	19	43	−24	18	Withdrew (Note: The main clubs of Illichivets-2 Mariupol and FC Metalurh-2 Zaporizhzhia withdrew their junior clubs from PFL due to the inaugural of Ukrainian Premier League Under-19 competition which is to start next season. (6 June 2012))
13	Illichivets-2 Mariupol	26	5	2	19	25	47	−22	17	Withdrew
14	Makiyivvuhillya Makiyivka	26	5	2	19	17	48	−31	17	

=== Results ===
As of May 28, 2012

Home \ Away	AVK	DD2	HIR	HIS	IL2	KRE	MKM	ME2	MYH	POL	SHS	SH3	STD	SE2
Avanhard Kramatorsk		0–2	2–1	1–0	2–0	3–0	4–1	1–0 (Note: Round 18 fixture was moved to RSK Olimpiyskiy due to the state of Avanhard Stadium in Kramatorsk after the winter break.)	0–1	2–1	2–0	1–2	1–0	3–0
Dnipro-2 Dnipropetrovsk	0–2		1–0	1–1	2–0	0–2	0–1	0–1	0–0	1–1	1–3	1–2	0–2	2–1
Hirnyk Kryvyi Rih	0–1	3–0		2–2	3–1	2–0	3–2	1–2	2–0	3–1	2–1	2–1	1–1	3–0 (Note: For the Round 25 fixture FC Sevastopol-2 did not travel for the game informing the PFL that fourteen of their players were unavailable. PFL awards a 3–0 technical victory to Hirnyk Kryvyi Rih. (24 May 2012))
Hirnyk-Sport Komsomolsk	0–3	2–0	0–2		4–2	3–1	1–0	1–0	1–2	1–2	2–3	1–1	0–0	2–0
Illichivets-2 Mariupol	1–2	1–4	0–3	1–1		0–1	0–2	3–0	2–2	0–2	0–1	3–0	0–2	0–1
Kremin Kremenchuk	0–1	3–0	2–1	2–1	0–1		1–0	2–0	1–0	1–1	1–0	2–0	1–0	1–0
Makiyivvuhillya Makiyivka (Note: Makiyivvuhillya Makiyivka played their home games in Metalurh Stadium, Yenakiieve in the spring session. They returned to their home stadium Avandard, for a Round 15 fixture. After the winter break they played their home games at Shakhtar Academy Stadium in Makiyivka.)	0–1	3–0 (Note: For the Round 26 fixture the administration of Dnipro-2 Dnipropetrovsk has indicated that the club will not play the match against Makiyivvuhillya. PFL awards a 3–0 technical victory to Makiyivvuhillya Makiyivka.)	0–1	2–1	2–5	0–1		1–0	1–2	0–5	0–4	3–5	0–3	1–2
Metalurh-2 Zaporizhzhia	0–4	2–2	0–2	1–1	2–1	0–1	1–0		0–1	0–2	1–2	0–3	2–3	2–3
Myr Hornostayivka	2–1	3–0 (Note: For the Round 22 fixture Dnipro-2 Dnipropetrovsk did not arrive for the game. PFL awards a 3–0 technical victory to Myr Hornostayivka. (17 May 2012))	0–1	3–0	1–0	2–2	0–0	1–1		2–3	2–2	2–1	1–1	2–0
FC Poltava	2–1	3–1	0–0	1–1	1–0	2–0	1–0	1–0	3–0		2–0	5–0	3–1	2–0
Shakhtar Sverdlovsk	0–0	1–1	2–1	3–0	4–0 (Note: Round 17 fixture was moved to RSK Olimpiyskiy due to the state of Shakhtar's home ground after the winter break.)	2–2	3–0	2–0	2–1	1–1		5–1	3–0	2–1
Shakhtar-3 Donetsk	0–1	4–1	1–3	3–1	2–1	2–5	2–0	3–2	2–3	0–2	0–2		1–3 (Note: Low attendance of 20 between Shakhtar-3–Stal in Round 18 (12 April 2012))	7–2
Stal Dniprodzerzhynsk	1–2	2–0	1–0	2–0	1–0	0–1	1–0	1–0	0–1	2–0	1–0	3–1		3–0
FC Sevastopol-2	1–0	2–4	1–2	1–1	2–3	2–1	1–1	1–2	0–2	1–3	1–1	2–1	1–0	

Updated to match(es) played on 28 May 2012. Source: PFL Druha Liha B Calendar
Legend: Blue = home team win; Yellow = draw; Red = away team win.

=== Top scorers ===
As of May 28, 2012

	Scorer	Goals (Pen.)	Team
1	(Ukraine) Yevhen Radionov	12	FC Poltava
1	(Ukraine) Yuriy Kolomoyets	12 (2)	Hirnyk Kryvyi Rih
3	(Ukraine) Ivan Dotsenko	11 (5)	Myr Hornostayivka
4	(Ukraine) Seykhan Aliyev	9	Stal Dniprodzerzhynsk
4	(Ukraine) Oleh Shevchenko	9 (8)	Avanhard Kramatorsk

=== Championship game ===
A championship game will be played between the top teams of each group competition.

2 June 2012
17:00 EEST

FC Poltava	0 – 2	FC Sumy
		Melnyk 14'; Ryabtsev 75'

Lokomotiv Stadium, Poltava
Attendance: 2,000
Referee: Ivan Bodnar (Kyiv)

FC Sumy were crowned as the Second League champions.

=== Playoff among second-placed teams (Third place playoff) ===
In addition to the championship playoff, an extra playoff between the two second-placed teams took place. The winner of the playoff qualified for the promotion/relegation matchup with the 16th-placed team of the First League for a place in the 2012–13 Ukrainian First League competition.

30 May 2012
18:00 EEST

Desna Chernihiv	0 – 1	Avanhard Kramatorsk
	Report	Kozban 65'

Podillya Stadium, Khmelnytskyi
Referee: Serhiy Skrypak (Kyiv oblast)

Avanhard Kramatorsk qualified for the promotion/relegation playoff.

==== Playoff bracket ====
Third-place playoff			Promotion/relegation playoff
			1L	MFC Mykolaiv	4
A2	Desna Chernihiv	0	2L	Avanhard Kramatorsk	3
B2	Avanhard Kramatorsk	1

- 1L – First League
- 2L – Second League
- A2 – second place in Group A
- B2 – second place in Group B

== See also ==
- 2011–12 Ukrainian Premier League
- 2011–12 Ukrainian First League
- 2011–12 Ukrainian Cup
