= 2020 Football Championship of Luhansk Oblast =

Football Championship of Luhansk Oblast
- Season: 2020
- Champions: Skif Shulhynka

The 2020 Football Championship of Luhansk Oblast was won by Skif Shulhynka.

As the last season, the competition also consisted of two stages, but in a different way. All participants were splint into two groups at the first stage with the best 3 from each qualifying for the First League, the second best 3 for the Second League.

== First stage ==
=== Group 1 ===
Pos	Team	Pld	W	D	L	GF	GA	GD	Pts	Notes
1	Skif Shulhynka	7	6	1	0	50	7	+43	19	Qualified to First League
2	Budivelnyk Lysychansk	7	6	1	0	39	7	+32	19	Qualified to First League
3	Nyva Markivka	7	4	0	3	29	14	+15	12	Qualified to First League
4	Stanychnyk Stanytsia Luhanska	7	3	0	4	14	31	-17	9	Qualified to Second League
5	FC Novopskov	7	3	0	4	15	22	-7	9	Qualified to Second League
6	FC Bilokurakyne	7	1	2	4	15	25	-10	5	Qualified to Second League
7	FC Bilovodsk	7	1	1	5	7	22	-15	4	Relegated
8	FC Milove	7	1	1	5	5	46	-41	4	Relegated

Source:"Календар Чемпіонату Луганської області з футболу 2020 року". Luhansk Oblast Association of Football. Archived from the original on 2020-11-25.

=== Group 2 ===
Pos	Team	Pld	W	D	L	GF	GA	GD	Pts	Notes
1	Shakhta Melnykova Lysychansk	6	4	1	1	14	2	+12	13	Qualified to First League
2	Olimp Starobilsk	6	3	2	1	11	7	+4	11	Qualified to First League
3	FC Kreminna	6	3	1	2	14	10	+4	10	Qualified to First League
4	Lokomotyv Popasna	6	2	4	0	11	8	+3	10	Qualified to Second League
5	Khimobladnannia Severodonetsk	6	2	1	3	5	6	-1	7	Qualified to Second League
6	Stozhary Svatove	6	0	3	3	11	18	-7	3	Qualified to Second League
7	Urozhai Severodonetsk	6	0	2	4	6	21	-15	2	Relegated

Source:"Календар Чемпіонату Луганської області з футболу 2020 року". Luhansk Oblast Association of Football. Archived from the original on 2020-11-25.

== First League ==
Pos	Team	Pld	W	D	L	GF	GA	GD	Pts	Qualification or relegation
1	Skif Shulhynka (C)	5	4	1	0	20	6	+14	13	Champion
2	Budivelnyk Lysychansk	5	4	1	0	15	3	+12	13	
3	Nyva Markivka	5	2	1	2	11	14	−3	7	
4	Shakhta Melnykova Lysychansk	5	1	1	3	8	13	−5	4	
5	FC Kreminna	5	1	0	4	5	12	−7	3	
6	Olimp Starobilsk	5	1	0	4	7	18	−11	3	

Source: "Чемпіонат Луганської області 2020". Footboom. Archived from the original on 2020-11-25.
(C) Champions
