= 2019 Football Championship of Luhansk Oblast =

Football Championship of Luhansk Oblast
- Season: 2019
- Champions: Skif Shulhynka

The 2019 Football Championship of Luhansk Oblast was won by Skif Shulhynka.

The competition consisted of two stages. After the first stage consisting of a single round-robin, all teams were split depending on the points earned with the best 8 qualifying for the First League and the rest 5 for the Second League. During the second stage the 8 First League teams played off for championship title another single round robin, while the 5 Second League teams played off for final ranking also their round-robin tournament.

== League table ==
Pos	Team	Pld	W	D	L	GF	GA	GD	Pts	Qualification or relegation
1	Skif Shulhynka (C)	19	17	2	0	91	3	+88	53	First League/Champion
2	Khimobladnannia Severodonetsk	19	12	4	3	48	21	+27	40	First League
3	Budivelnyk Lysychansk	19	12	3	4	53	12	+41	39	First League
4	Shakhta Melnykova Lysychansk	19	10	5	4	49	16	+33	35	First League
5	Olimp Starobilsk	19	10	1	8	50	32	+18	31	First League
6	FC Kreminna	19	9	3	7	48	36	+12	30	First League
7	Stozhary Svatove	19	6	1	12	29	47	−18	19	First League
8	Urozhai Severodonetsk	19	4	3	12	31	75	−44	15	First League
9	Stanychnyk Stanytsia Luhanska	16	8	1	7	49	41	+8	24	Second League
10	Nyva Markovka	16	6	0	10	40	45	−5	18	Second League
11	FC Novopskov	16	5	2	9	28	45	−17	17	Second League
12	FC Bilovodsk	16	3	1	12	17	65	−48	9	Second League
13	FC Milove	16	1	0	15	18	113	−95	2	Second League

Source: "Чемпіонат Луганської області 2019". Footboom. Archived from the original on 2019-07-17.; "Чемпионат Луганской области 2019". Footballfacts.ru.
(C) Champions
- Stanychnyk, Bilovodsk, Milove had one point deducted from them.
