= Hennadiy Sushko =

Ukrainian footballer (born 1970)

Personal information
- Full name: Hennadiy Mykolayovych Sushko
- Date of birth: 28 January 1970 (age 56)
- Place of birth: Popasna, Ukrainian SSR
- Height: 1.74 m (5 ft 9 in)
- Positions: Defender; forward; midfielder

Senior career*
Years	Team	Apps	(Gls)
1988	FC Stakhanovets Stakhanov		
1989–1991	FC Prykarpattya Ivano-Frankivsk	62	(4)
1991–1993	FC Shakhtar Stakhanov	92	(6)
1994–1997	FC Khimik Sieverodonetsk	142	(24)
1997–1998	FC Metalurh Mariupol	11	(0)
1998–1999	FC Zhemchuzhina Sochi	6	(0)
1998–1999	→ FC Zhemchuzhina-2 Sochi (loans)	9	(0)
2000	FC Fagot-Vugleremont Krasnyi Luch		
2001–2002	FC Zorya Luhansk	17	(5)
2002	FC Avanhard Rovenky	14	(3)
2003–2004	FC Zorya Luhansk	42	(4)
2004	PFC Shakhtar Sverdlovsk		
2004–2005	FC Molniya Sieverodonetsk	3	(0)
2005–2006	PFC Shakhtar Sverdlovsk (amateur)		
2007–2009	PFC Shakhtar Sverdlovsk	43	(3)

Managerial career
- 2009–2010: PFC Shakhtar Sverdlovsk (coach-administrator)
- 2010–2012: PFC Shakhtar Sverdlovsk (assistant)
- 2012–2014: PFC Shakhtar Sverdlovsk
- * Club domestic league appearances and goals

Hennadiy Mykolayovych Sushko (Ukrainian: Геннадій Миколайович Сушко; born 28 January 1970) is a Ukrainian football coach and a former player.
