= Holovkivka =

Holovkivka (Ukrainian: Головківка) may to the following places in Ukraine:

- Holovkivka, Cherkasy Oblast, village in Cherkasy Raion, Cherkasy Oblast
- Holovkivka, Kirovohrad Oblast, village in Oleksandriia Raion, Kirovohrad Oblast
