= Vladyslav Korobkin =

Ukrainian footballer (born 1983)

Personal information
- Full name: Vladyslav Volodymyrovych Korobkin
- Date of birth: 21 January 1983 (age 43)
- Place of birth: Kharkiv, Ukrainian SSR
- Height: 1.84 m (6 ft 1/2 in)
- Position: Striker

Team information
- Current team: FC Lyubotyn

Youth career
- 1999–2000: UFK Kharkiv

Senior career*
Years	Team	Apps	(Gls)
2000–2001	FC Metalist-2 Kharkiv	16	(2)
2002–2006	FC Obolon Kyiv	21	(2)
2002–2006	FC Obolon-2 Kyiv	63	(22)
2003–2004	→FC Podillya Khmelnytskyi	32	(11)
2006–2007	FC Spartak Ivano-Frankivsk	14	(4)
2007	PFC Sevastopol	4	(0)
2007	FC Komunalnyk Luhansk	15	(3)
2009	FC Arsenal Kharkiv	12	(3)
2009–2010	FC Bukovyna Chernivtsi	40	(17)
2011–2013	FC Shakhtar Sverdlovsk	87	(29)
2014–2016	FC Solli Plyus Kharkiv	62	(44)
2017–	FC Lyubotyn		
- * Club domestic league appearances and goals as of 2016-17 season

Vladyslav Korobkin (Ukrainian: Владислав Володимирович Коробкін, born 21 January 1983 in Kharkiv in the Ukrainian SSR of the Soviet Union) is a Ukrainian football striker who plays for FC Lyubotyn in the Kharkiv Oblast Football Championship.

Korobkin played for different clubs in three levels of Ukrainian Leagues. He made his first team debut in Premier League's match for Obolon Kyiv against FC Arsenal Kyiv on 18 May 2003, as was substituted in second time.
