= Oleh Tarasenko =

Ukrainian footballer

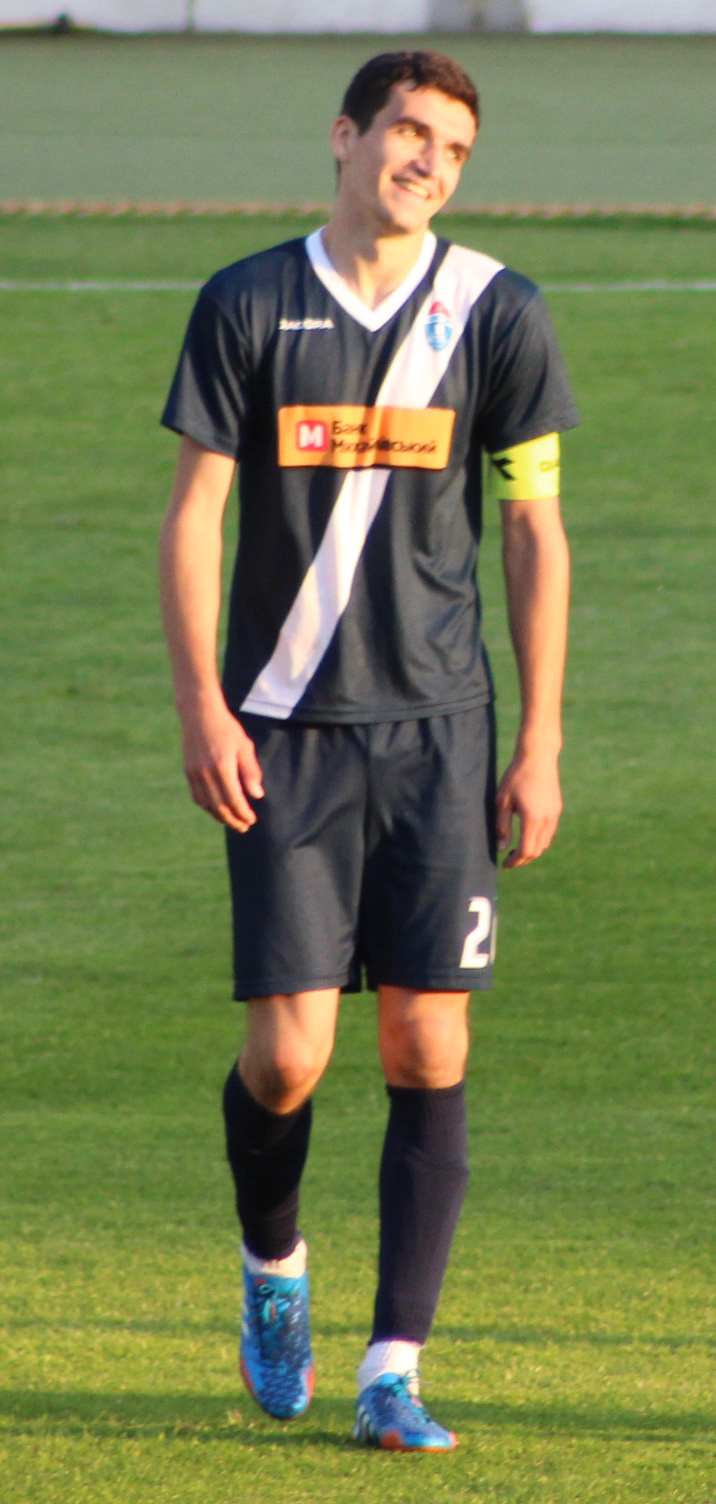
- Oleh Tarasenko in 2014.

Personal information
- Full name: Oleh Volodymyrovych Tarasenko
- Date of birth: 23 June 1990 (age 36)
- Place of birth: Cherkasy, Ukrainian SSR
- Height: 1.90 m (6 ft 3 in)
- Position: Centre-back

Team information
- Current team: LNZ Cherkasy
- Number: 90

Youth career
- 2003–2007: Slavutych Cherkasy

Senior career*
Years	Team	Apps	(Gls)
2008	FC Khodak Cherkasy	4	(2)
2008–2011	Karpaty Lviv	0	(0)
2011–2013	Slavutych Cherkasy	48	(11)
2013	Bukovyna Chernivtsi	6	(0)
2014–2019	Cherkashchyna-Akademiya	148	(27)
2019–2020	Stomil Olsztyn	10	(0)
2020	Tukums 2000	0	(0)
2021–	LNZ Cherkasy	35	(1)
2022	→ Wissa Szczuczyn (loan)	14	(0)
- * Club domestic league appearances and goals as of 23 June 2024

Oleh Tarasenko (Ukrainian: Олег Володимирович Тарасенко; born 23 June 1990) is a Ukrainian professional footballer who plays as a defender for FC LNZ Cherkasy.
