= 2006 Ukrainian Football Amateur League =

Ukrainian Football Amateur League
- Season: 2006
- Champions: Shakhtar Sverdlovsk (1st title) Hran Buzova (losing finalist)
- Promoted: 3 – Lokomotyv D., Shakhtar Sv.,* Nyva V.*

Following are the results of the Ukrainian Football Amateur League 2006 season. Participation is restricted to the regional (Oblast) champions and/or the most regarded team by the respective regional association.

This season competition consisted of three stages. All of the stages were organized in regional principal and was played in two rounds where each team could play another at its home ground except the last one. The third stage was played in the single round to identify the finalists and the third place contenders. There were six groups in the first stage and four - in the second. The third part, which was the final consisted of two groups. The winners of groups advance to the finals and runners-up match up in the game for the third place.

== Teams ==
=== Returning ===
- Elektrometalurh-NZF Nikopol
- Shakhtar Sverdlovsk

=== Debut ===
List of teams that are debuting this season in the league.

- FC Bilyayivka
- Khimmash Korosten
- Nyva-Svitanok Vinnytsia
- FC Velyka Bahachka
- Bryz Izmail
- Khodak Cherkasy
- Sokil Sukhovolia
- Hran Buzova
- Lokomotyv Dvorichna
- Shakhtar Konotop
- Iskra-Podillia Teofipol
- Metalurh Malyn
- Tsementnyk Yamnytsia

=== Withdrawn ===
List of clubs that took part in last year competition, but chose not to participate in 2006 season:

- HU ZIDMU-Spartak Zaporizhzhia
- FC Nizhyn
- KZEZO Kakhovka
- ODEK Orzhiv
- Kolos Stepove
- Yevropa Pryluky
- Metalist-UHMK Kyiv
- ZAlK Zaporizhia

=== Location map ===
Location of participating teams in the 2009 Ukrainian amateur championship

== First stage ==
=== Group A ===
Pos	Team	Pld	W	D	L	GF	GA	GD	Pts	Qualification
1	Sokil Sukhovolia	6	5	1	0	9	0	+9	16	Second Stage
2	Iskra Teofipol	6	4	0	2	12	4	+8	12	Second Stage
4	Tsementnyk Yamnytsia	6	1	1	4	4	10	−6	4	
5	Volyn Zdolbuniv	6	1	0	5	4	15	−11	3	Second Stage

=== Group B ===
Pos	Team	Pld	W	D	L	GF	GA	GD	Pts	Qualification
1	Khimmash Korosten	6	4	2	0	13	1	+12	14	Second Stage
2	Nyva Vinnytsia	6	2	3	1	7	3	+4	9	Second Stage
3	Hran Buzova	6	1	3	2	2	6	−4	6	Second Stage
4	Metalurh Malyn	6	0	2	4	3	15	−12	2	

=== Group C ===
Pos	Team	Pld	W	D	L	GF	GA	GD	Pts	Qualification
1	Velyka Bahachka	4	2	2	0	1	0	+1	8	Second Stage
2	Shakhtar Konotop	4	0	4	0	1	1	0	4	Second Stage
3	Lokomotyv Dvorichna	4	0	2	2	1	2	−1	2	joined Druha Liha

=== Group D ===
Pos	Team	Pld	W	D	L	GF	GA	GD	Pts	Qualification
1	Shakhtar Sverdlovsk	4	2	2	0	5	3	+2	8	Second Stage
2	Hirnyk Komsomolske	4	1	2	1	2	2	0	5	Second Stage
3	Lokomotyv Kupyansk	4	1	0	3	1	3	−2	3	Second Stage

=== Group E ===
Pos	Team	Pld	W	D	L	GF	GA	GD	Pts	Qualification
1	Ivan Odesa	4	2	1	1	8	2	+6	7	Second Stage
2	Bryz Izmail	4	2	0	2	3	8	−5	6	Second Stage
3	Illichivets Uman	4	1	1	2	2	3	−1	4	

=== Group F ===
Pos	Team	Pld	W	D	L	GF	GA	GD	Pts	Qualification
1	Khodak Cherkasy	4	2	2	0	8	3	+5	8	Second Stage
2	Elektrometalurh Nikopol	4	1	2	1	4	4	0	5	Second Stage
3	Biliaivka	4	1	0	3	3	8	−5	3	Second Stage

== Second stage ==
=== Group 1 ===
Pos	Team	Pld	W	D	L	GF	GA	GD	Pts	Qualification
1	Sokil Sukhovolia	6	4	1	1	11	5	+6	13	Third Stage
2	Nyva Vinnytsia	6	3	2	1	14	5	+9	11	Third Stage
3	Khimmash Korosten	6	2	1	3	13	10	+3	7	
3	Volyn Zdolbuniv	6	1	0	5	6	24	−18	3	

=== Group 2 ===
Pos	Team	Pld	W	D	L	GF	GA	GD	Pts	Qualification
1	Hran Buzova	6	2	4	0	7	2	+5	10	Third Stage
2	Lokomotyv Kupyansk	6	2	3	1	6	4	+2	9	Third Stage
3	Velyka Bahachka	6	1	3	2	2	4	−2	6	
3	Iskra Teofipol	6	1	2	3	3	8	−5	5	

=== Group 3 ===
Pos	Team	Pld	W	D	L	GF	GA	GD	Pts	Qualification
1	Biliaivka	6	3	3	0	8	4	+4	12	Third Stage
2	Khodak Cherkasy	6	2	3	1	7	4	+3	9	Third Stage
3	Ivan Odesa	6	2	3	1	3	2	+1	9	
3	Briz Izmail	6	0	1	5	3	11	−8	1	

=== Group 4 ===
Pos	Team	Pld	W	D	L	GF	GA	GD	Pts	Qualification
1	Shakhtar Sverdlovsk	6	4	1	1	9	3	+6	13	Third Stage
2	Elektrometalurh Nikopol	6	3	1	2	7	6	+1	10	Third Stage
3	Shakhtar Konotop	6	2	1	3	9	12	−3	7	
3	Hirnyk Komsomolske	6	1	1	4	8	12	−4	4	

== Third stage ==
(in Baryshivka)

=== Group A ===
Pos	Team	Pld	W	D	L	GF	GA	GD	Pts	Qualification
1	Hran Buzova (H)	3	2	1	0	5	2	+3	7	Final game
2	Sokil Sukhovolia	3	2	0	1	3	3	0	6	Third place
3	Biliaivka	3	1	1	1	1	2	−1	4	
3	Nyva Vinnytsia	3	0	0	3	0	2	−2	0	

(H) Hosts

(in Sverdlovsk)

=== Group B ===
Pos	Team	Pld	W	D	L	GF	GA	GD	Pts	Qualification
1	Shakhtar Sverdlovsk (H)	3	2	1	0	4	1	+3	7	Final game
2	Khodak Cherkasy	3	1	2	0	5	3	+2	5	Third place
3	Lokomotyv Kupyansk	3	1	1	1	8	7	+1	4	
3	Elektrometalurh Nikopol	3	0	0	3	2	8	−6	0	

(H) Hosts

== Final ==
The game took place in Lubny, Poltava Oblast. October 1, 2006.

Shakhtar Sverdlovsk - Hran Buzova 1:0 (1:0)

Match for the 3rd place
Khodak Cherkasy - Sokil Sukhovolia +:-

== Number of teams by region ==
Number	Region	Team(s)
3	Odesa Oblast	FC Bilyayivka, Bryz Izmail, Ivan Odesa
2	Cherkasy Oblast	Illichivets Uman, Khodak Cherkasy
2	Kharkiv Oblast	Lokomotyv Dvorichna, Lokomotyv Kupiansk
2	Zhytomyr Oblast	Khimmash Korosten, Metalurh Malyn
1	Dnipropetrovsk Oblast	Elektrometalurh-NZF Nikopol
1	Donetsk Oblast	Hirnyk Komsomolske
1	Ivano-Frankivsk Oblast	Tsementnyk Yamnytsia
1	Khmelnytskyi Oblast	Iskra-Podillia Teofipol
1	Kyiv Oblast	Hran Buzova
1	Luhansk Oblast	Shakhtar Sverdlovsk
1	Lviv Oblast	Sokil Sukhovolia
1	Poltava Oblast	FC Velyka Bahachka
1	Rivne Oblast	Volyn-Tsement Zdolbuniv
1	Sumy Oblast	Shakhtar Konotop
1	Vinnytsia Oblast	Nyva-Svitanok Vinnytsia
