= FC SKAD-Yalpuh Bolhrad =

- Full name: FC SKAD-Yalpuh Bolhrad
- Founded: 1950
- Dissolved: 2012
- Ground: Central Stadium UPD, Izmail (Temporary)
- Chairman: Volodymr Yusin
- Manager: Oleksandr Shcherbakov

FC SKAD-Yalpuh Bolhrad (Ukrainian: Спортивний клуб аеромобільної дивізії-Ялпуг («СКАД-Ялпуг»)) was a professional Ukrainian football club from the city of Bolhrad, Odesa Oblast. The club's acronym SKAD stands for Sport Club of Aeromobile Division, while Yalpuh is the name of a nearby river and a lake.

== History ==
The club has been playing in the regional league for fourteen years.

The club competed in the Ukrainian Amateur championship in 2011.

The club submitted a license to the Professional Football League of Ukraine and was accepted into the Ukrainian Second League for the 2011–12 season.

However, preparations for the 2012 spring session of the Druha Liha A competition were halted when the club informed the PFL that due to lack of financial backing the club was withdrawing from the competition.

== Future plans ==
The club plans to build a stadium in the village of Vynohradne, in the Bolhrad District, located on the route to Odesa – Bolhrad is about a distance of 40 km (25 mi) from the oblast seat. Also a modern hotel is planned to be built for visiting teams and two new training fields.

== League and cup history ==
Season	Div.	Pos.	Pl.	W	D	L	GS	GA	P	Domestic Cup	Europe	Notes
2011	4th	5	10	1	1	8	4	25	4			
2011–12	3rd "A"	14	26	2	1	23	10	54	7	1/64 finals		Withdrew
