= Oleh Kotelyukh =

Ukrainian footballer

Personal information
- Date of birth: 19 June 1979 (age 47)
- Place of birth: Boryspil, Soviet Union (now Ukraine)
- Height: 1.84 m (6 ft 1/2 in)
- Position: Defender

Senior career*
Years	Team	Apps	(Gls)
1996–1998	FC Veres Rivne	67	(0)
1999–2005	FC Borysfen Boryspil	181	(6)
2002	→ FC Borysfen-2 Boryspil	1	(0)
2005–2008	FC Kryvbas Kryvyi Rih	57	(0)
2009–2010	FC Zirka Kirovohrad	42	(4)
2010	FC Naftovyk-Ukrnafta Okhtyrka	14	(0)
2011–2015	PFC Sumy	129	(7)
2016	FC Arsenal-Kyiv	21	(0)
- * Club domestic league appearances and goals

Oleh Kotelyukh (Ukrainian: Олег Котелюх; born 19 June 1979 in Boryspil) is a Ukrainian professional football defender.

== Career ==
He played in the Ukrainian First League for FC Zirka Kirovohrad. He joined Kryvbas from Borysfen in 2005.

Kotelyukh was born on 19 June 1979 in the city of Boryspil, in the Ukrainian republic of the Soviet Union (in the Kyiv Oblast of present-day Ukraine).
