= 2011 Ukrainian Football Amateur League =

Ukrainian Football Amateur League
- Season: 2011
- Champions: Nove Zhyttia Andriyivka (1st title) FC Putrivka (losing finalist)
- Promoted: 8 – UkrAhroKom, Slavutych, Real Pharma, Myr, Krystal, SKAD-Yalpuh, Avanhard, Makiivvuhillia

The 2011 Ukrainian Football Amateur League season.

== Teams ==
=== Returning/reformed clubs ===
- Krystal Kherson (returning, last played season in 1965 as Lokomotyv [klubnaya])
- Avanhard Kramatorsk (returning, last played season in 1995–96)
- FC Sambir (returning, last played season in 1997–98)
- Dinaz Vyshhorod (returning, last played season in 2000)
- Metalurh Malyn (returning, last played season in 2008)
- Zbruch Volochysk (returning, last played season in 2009)

=== Debut ===
List of teams that are debuting this season in the league.

- Arsenal Zhytomyr
- Nove Zhyttya Andriivka
- SKAD-Yalpuh Bolhrad
- FC Korosten
- FC Popasna
- Slavutych Cherkasy
- FC Lysychansk
- FC Putrivka
- Makiyivvuhillya Makiivka
- Real Pharma Yuzhne

=== Withdrawn ===
List of clubs that took part in last year competition, but chose not to participate in 2011 season:

- Elektrometalurh-NZF Nikopol
- Verest Dunaivtsi
- Khimmash Korosten
- FC Ternopil
- Topilche Ternopil

=== Location map ===
Location of participating teams in the 2011 Ukrainian amateur championship

== First stage ==
=== Group 1 ===
Pos	Team	Pld	W	D	L	GF	GA	GD	Pts	Qualification
1	Sambir (Q)	12	8	3	1	24	5	+19	27	Second Stage
2	Zbruch Volochysk (Q)	12	8	1	3	20	12	+8	25	Second Stage
3	ODEK Orzhiv (Q)	12	7	1	4	27	14	+13	22	Play-off
4	Arsenal Zhytomyr	12	7	1	4	18	12	+6	22	
5	Avanhard Novohrad-Volynsky	12	4	0	8	17	26	−9	12	
6	Korosten	12	3	2	7	14	20	−6	11	
7	Metalurh Malyn	12	1	0	11	9	40	−31	3	

(Q) Qualified for the phase indicated

=== Group 2 ===
Pos	Team	Pld	W	D	L	GF	GA	GD	Pts	Qualification
1	Nove Zhyttia Andriyivka (Q)	10	9	0	1	25	8	+17	27	Second Stage
2	Putrivka (Q)	10	6	0	4	21	12	+9	18	Second Stage
3	Yednist-2 Plysky (Q)	10	5	1	4	14	17	−3	16	Play-off
4	UkrAhroKom Holovkivka (Q)	10	5	0	5	20	12	+8	15	Second League
5	Slavutych Cherkasy (Q)	10	4	0	6	8	17	−9	12	Second League
6	Dinaz Vyshhorod	10	0	1	9	3	25	−22	1	

(Q) Qualified for the phase indicated

=== Group 3 ===
Pos	Team	Pld	W	D	L	GF	GA	GD	Pts	Qualification
1	Torpedo Mykolaiv (Q)	10	7	2	1	25	10	+15	23	Second Stage
2	Real Pharm Yuzhne (Q)	10	7	1	2	21	11	+10	22	Second League
3	Myr Hornostayivka (Q)	10	5	2	3	17	7	+10	17	Second League
4	Krystal Kherson (Q)	10	5	1	4	19	14	+5	16	Second League
5	SKAD-Yalpuh Bolhrad (Q)	10	1	1	8	4	25	−21	4	Second League
6	Olimpik Kirovohrad	10	0	3	7	3	22	−19	3	

(Q) Qualified for the phase indicated

=== Group 4 ===
Pos	Team	Pld	W	D	L	GF	GA	GD	Pts	Qualification
1	Avanhard Kramatorsk (Q)	8	6	1	1	15	4	+11	19	Second League
2	Lokomotyv Kupiansk (Q)	8	5	2	1	12	4	+8	17	Second Stage
3	Lysychansk (Q)	8	3	1	4	6	9	−3	10	Second Stage
4	Makiyivvuhillya Makiivka (Q)	8	2	2	4	6	11	−5	8	Second League
5	Popasna	8	0	2	6	4	15	−11	2	

(Q) Qualified for the phase indicated

=== Play-off ===
ODEK Orzhiv – Yednist-2 Plysky 0:0 (aet) pen. 3:1

== Finals ==
=== Group A ===
Pos	Team	Pld	W	D	L	GF	GA	GD	Pts	Qualification	NZA	SMB	ODK	LSC
1	Nove Zhyttia Andriyivka (Q)	3	2	1	0	7	1	+6	7	Final game	—	1–1	3–1	3–0
2	Sambir (H)	3	1	2	0	3	2	+1	5			—	1–1	1–0
3	ODEK Orzhiv	3	0	2	1	3	6	−3	2				—	2–2
4	Lysychansk	3	0	1	2	2	6	−4	1					—

(H) Hosts; (Q) Qualified for the phase indicated

=== Group B ===
Pos	Team	Pld	W	D	L	GF	GA	GD	Pts	Qualification	PTR	TMY	LKU	ZVO
1	Putrivka (H, Q)	3	3	0	0	8	3	+5	9	Final game	—	2–1	3–1	3–1
2	Torpedo Mykolaiv	3	2	0	1	5	4	+1	6			—	2–1	2–1
3	Lokomotyv Kupiansk	3	1	0	2	5	6	−1	3				—	3–1
4	Zbruch Volochysk	3	0	0	3	3	8	−5	0					—

(H) Hosts; (Q) Qualified for the phase indicated

== Championship match ==
5 October 2011
16:00

Nove Zhyttia Andriivka	4 – 1	FC Putrivka
Melashchenko 21', 26'; Rotan 40', 76'	Report	Horyslavets 2' (o.g.)

Bannikov Stadium, Kyiv
Attendance: 400
Referee: Sapon

== Number of teams by region ==
Number	Region	Team(s)
4	Zhytomyr Oblast	Arsenal Zhytomyr, Avanhard Novohrad-Volynskyi, SC Korosten, Metalurh Malyn
2	Donetsk Oblast	Avanhard Kramatorsk, Makiivvuhillia Makiivka
2	Kherson Oblast	Krystal Kherson, Myr Hornostaivka
2	Kirovohrad Oblast	Olimpik Kirovohrad, UkrAhroKom Pryiutivka
2	Kyiv Oblast	Dinaz Vyshhorod, FC Putrivka
2	Luhansk Oblast	FC Lysychansk, FC Popasna
2	Odesa Oblast	Real Pharma Yuzhne, SKAD-Yalpuh Bolhrad
1	Cherkasy Oblast	Slavutych Cherkasy
1	Chernihiv Oblast	Yednist-2 Plysky
1	Kharkiv Oblast	Lokomotyv Kupiansk
1	Khmelnytskyi Oblast	Zbruch Volochysk
1	Lviv Oblast	FC Sambir
1	Mykolaiv Oblast	Torpedo Mykolaiv
1	Poltava Oblast	Nove Zhyttia Andriivka
1	Rivne Oblast	ODEK Orzhiv

== See also ==
- 2011 Ukrainian Amateur Cup
