= Holovkivka, Cherkasy Oblast =

Coordinates: 49.121°N 32.341°E

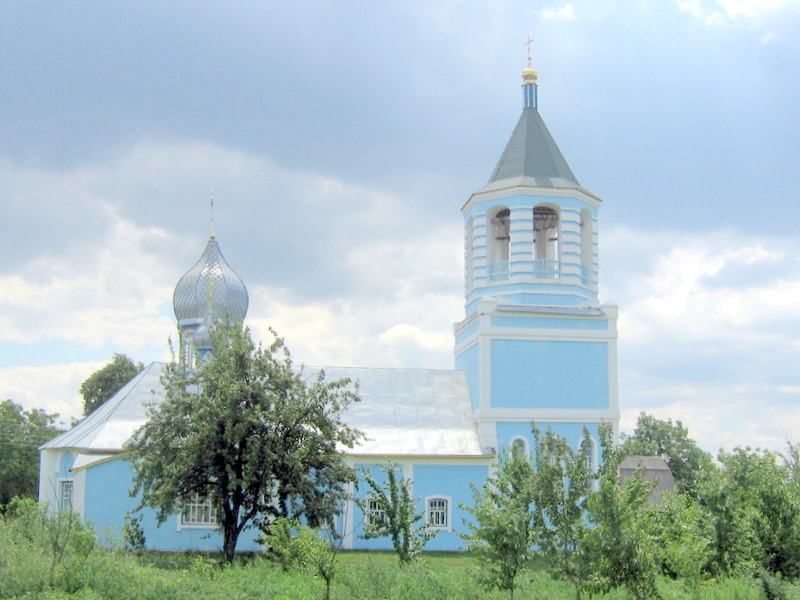
Church in Holovkivka

Holovkivka (Ukrainian: Головківка) is a village in Cherkasy Raion, Cherkasy Oblast, Ukraine. It is situated in a historical region called Kholodnyi Yar (Ukrainian: Холодний Яр), a big forest massif which has historical and environmental significance. Holovkivka belongs to Medvedivka rural hromada, one of the hromadas of Ukraine.

In the village there is a church named after Ivan Bohuslova and 2 chapels.

Until 18 July 2020, Holovkivka was in Chyhyryn Raion. The raion was abolished in July 2020 as part of the administrative reform of Ukraine, and its area was merged into Cherkasy Raion.

== Atamanskyi Park ==
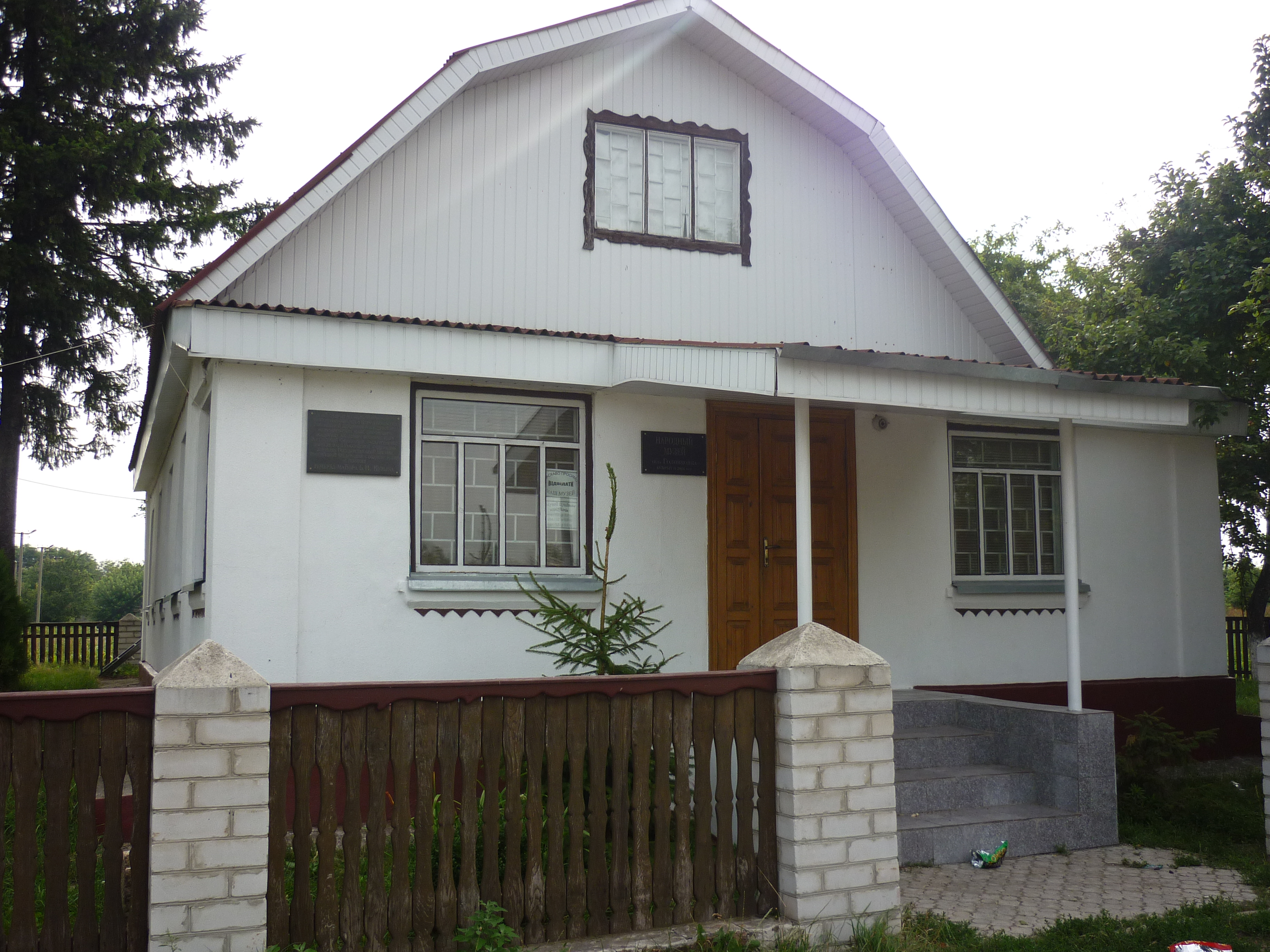
Holovkivka Museum

The Atamanskyi Park (Ukrainian: Атаманський парк) is another forest on the territory of Holovkivka. In 1972, it became a reservation due to historical events which took place in this forest. The whole area is 397 hectares big.

Inside the park there is a well called “Jhyvun”. People say it has healing features. Nowadays, the well, installed with benches, roof and stone paths leading towards it, attracts a lot of wanderers and locals from the region.

== Museum of Holovkivka ==
The museum is divided into several halls, each corresponds to a certain theme. The very first hall will tell you about the nature of the picturesque region. Among the expositions of other rooms there are thousands of unique things, historical documents and photographs. There are objects of antiquity, the Scythian era, the epoch of the Cossacks. Tourists can see local Ukrainian items of everyday usage, their decorations and national clothes, and they will discover the beauty of the ceramic pottery.
