= Bukovyna Stadium =

Stadium in Chernivtsi, Ukraine

- Стадіон «Буковина»
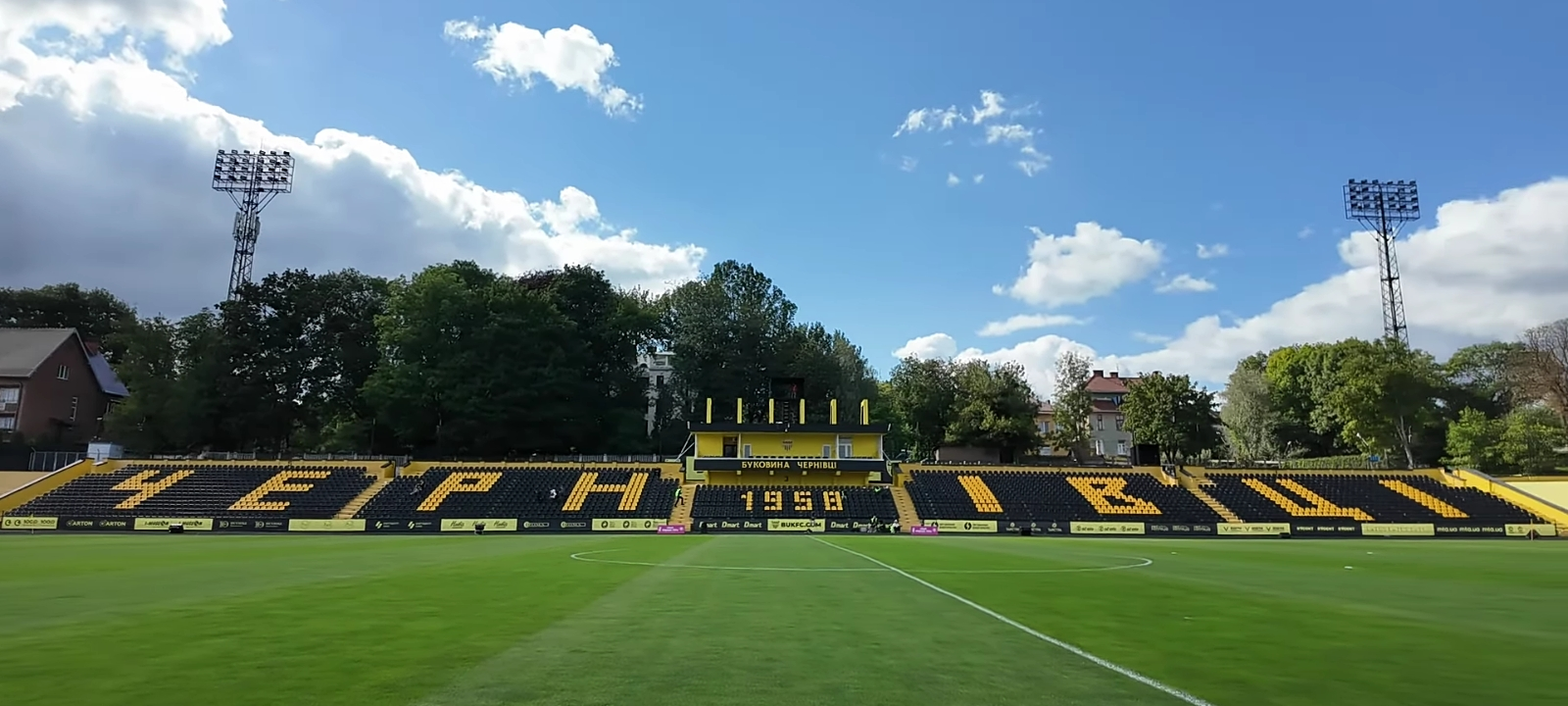
- Interactive map of Bukovyna Stadium
- Full name: Sports and recreation institution "Bukovyna"
- Former names: Dragoș Vodă, Dynamo, Avangard
- Address: 1, Olhy Huzar Street, Chernivtsi, Ukraine
- Coordinates: 48.275°N 25.942°E
- Owner: Chernivtsi City Council
- Capacity: 12,076 (football)
- Surface: Grass

Tenant
- FC Bukovyna Chernivtsi

Bukovyna Stadium is a multi-use stadium in Chernivtsi, Ukraine. It is used mostly for football matches, and is the home of FC Bukovyna Chernivtsi. The stadium hosts matches of the Ukrainian Championship and the Ukrainian Cup, as well as matches of the veteran championship, children's and youth tournaments, and the finals of the Chernivtsi Regional Cup. The stadium holds 12,000 spectators.

== History ==
The stadium was built on the basis of the post-war Dynamo stadium, which was used by the eponymous club. Until 1940, the stadium belonged to the Romanian club Dragoș Vodă, the stadium itself had the same name. Construction began in 1956 and the same year the stadium was opened. In 1957, a swimming pool began to operate on its territory. Factories and schools joined the construction, and many subbotniks were held.

In 1967, the stadium was completely reconstructed, with this year often being regarded as the year of the official opening. In 1968, in honor of the anniversary of this opening, a friendly match, between the local Bukovyna and the current USSR champion Dynamo Kyiv was held at the stadium.

In 2000, individual plastic seats were installed at the stadium, which reduced the capacity of the building from 17,000 to 12,000 seats. In 2015, the stadium was renovated, replacing the electronic 15 × 10 scoreboard with a digital information board.

In 2024, the stadium underwent a major renovation of the central facade and its under-stand areas, restrooms, food court, locker rooms, referee rooms, doping test rooms, and other cosmetic problems were fixed. A new coaching bridge (substitute bench) and a fan-shop were opened. The grandstand repairs are underway. It is planned to install field heating, replace lighting, and ensure the operation of the video assistant referee to prepare the stadium to the matches in the Ukrainian Premier League.

== Facilities ==
The stadium is located in the city center, near the Taras Shevchenko Culture and Recreation Park.

Part of the stadium complex includes a mini-football field with an artificial surface, a beach volleyball and tennis courts, where amateur competitions are held, in particular, the Chernivtsi mini-football championship between the various educational institutions of the region. The construction of a handball court is underway.

=== Musical venue ===
In 1989, the inaugural Chervona Ruta youth festival of Ukrainian contemporary music was held at the stadium. On 20 September 2009, an anniversary concert and the announcement of the winners of the 10th Chervona Ruta festival took place at the stadium. During the concert, President of Ukraine Viktor Yushchenko was present at the stadium.

On May 22, 2013, the stadium hosted a concert by the Ukrainian rock band Okean Elzy. The band performed at the stadium again on 2 October 2016 and 28 May 2017.

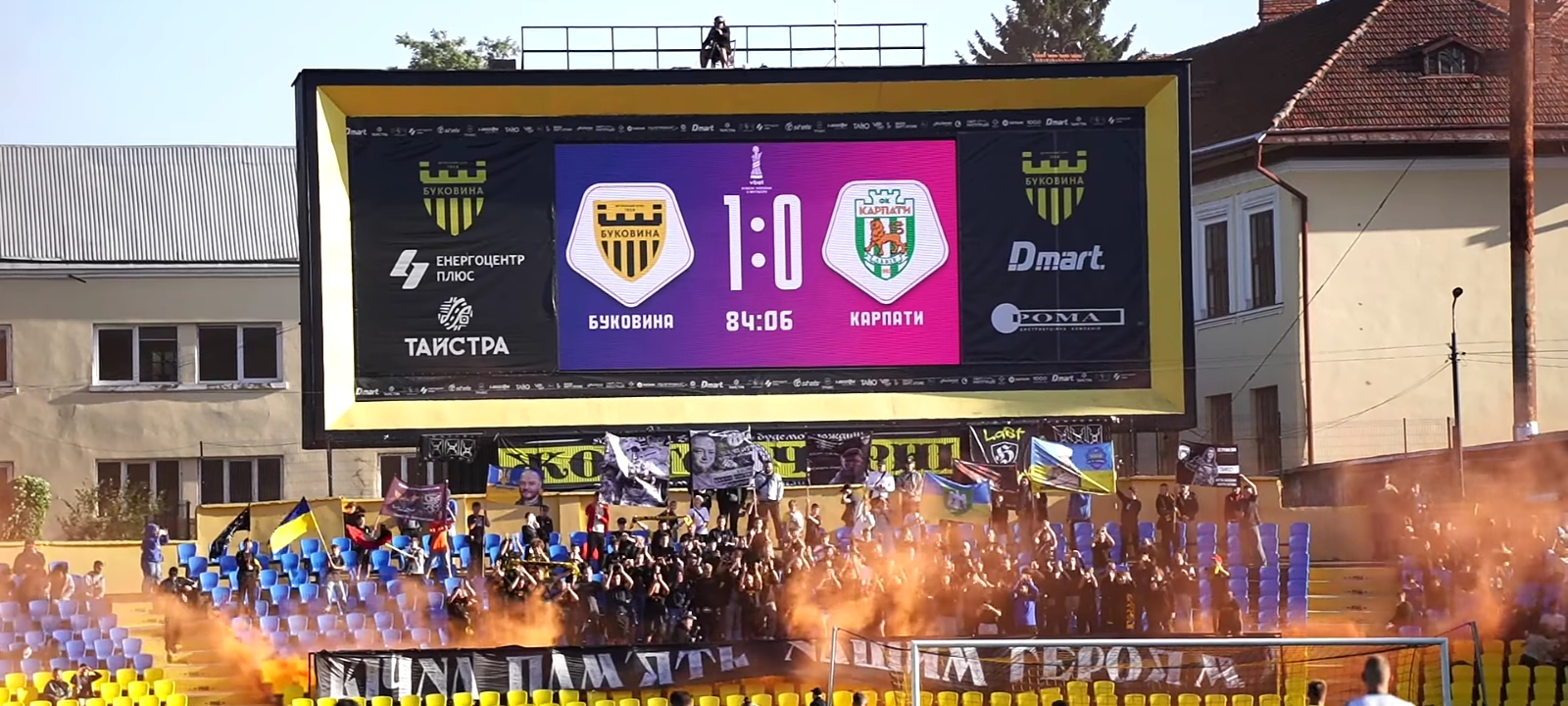
New information board

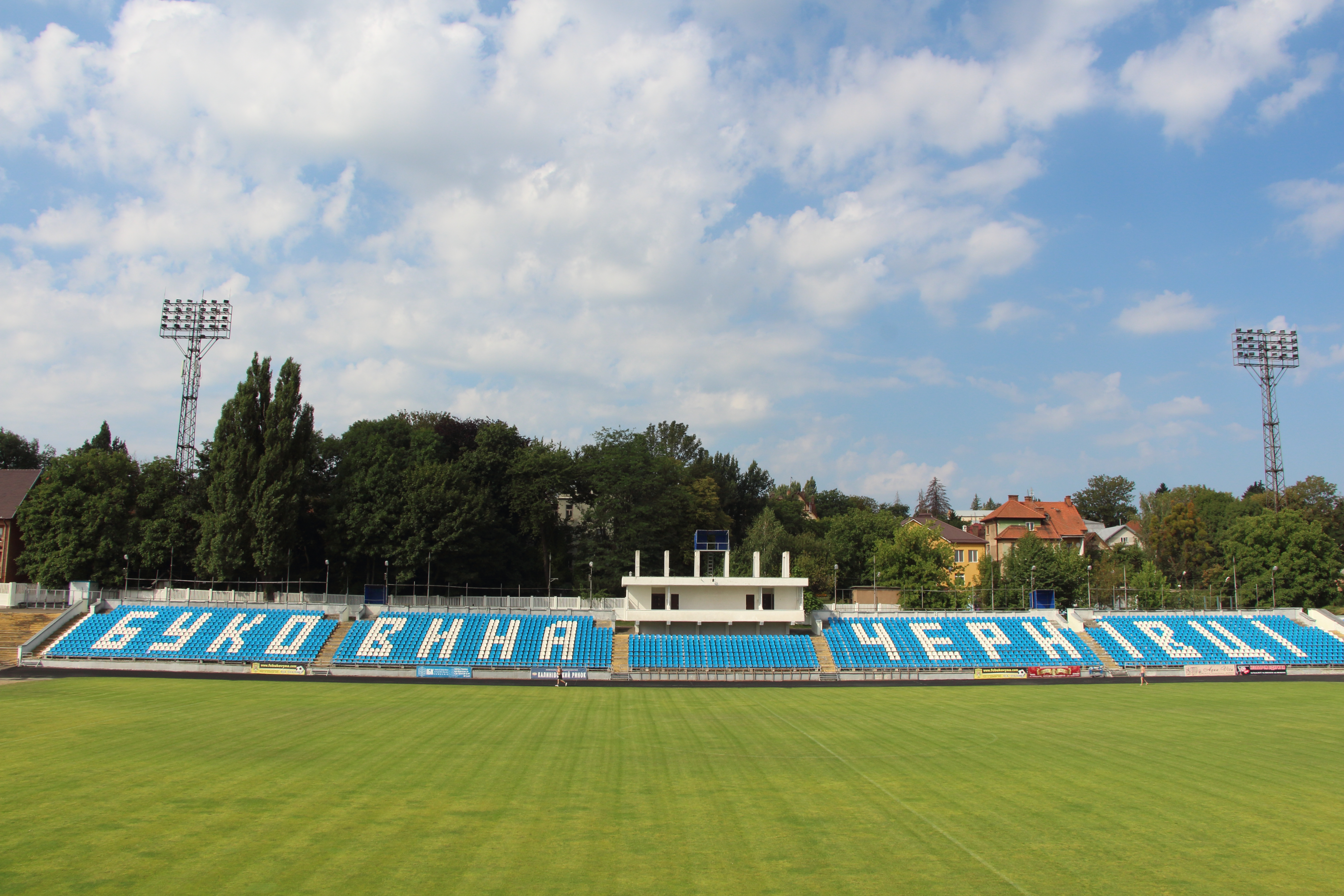
Stadium in 2013

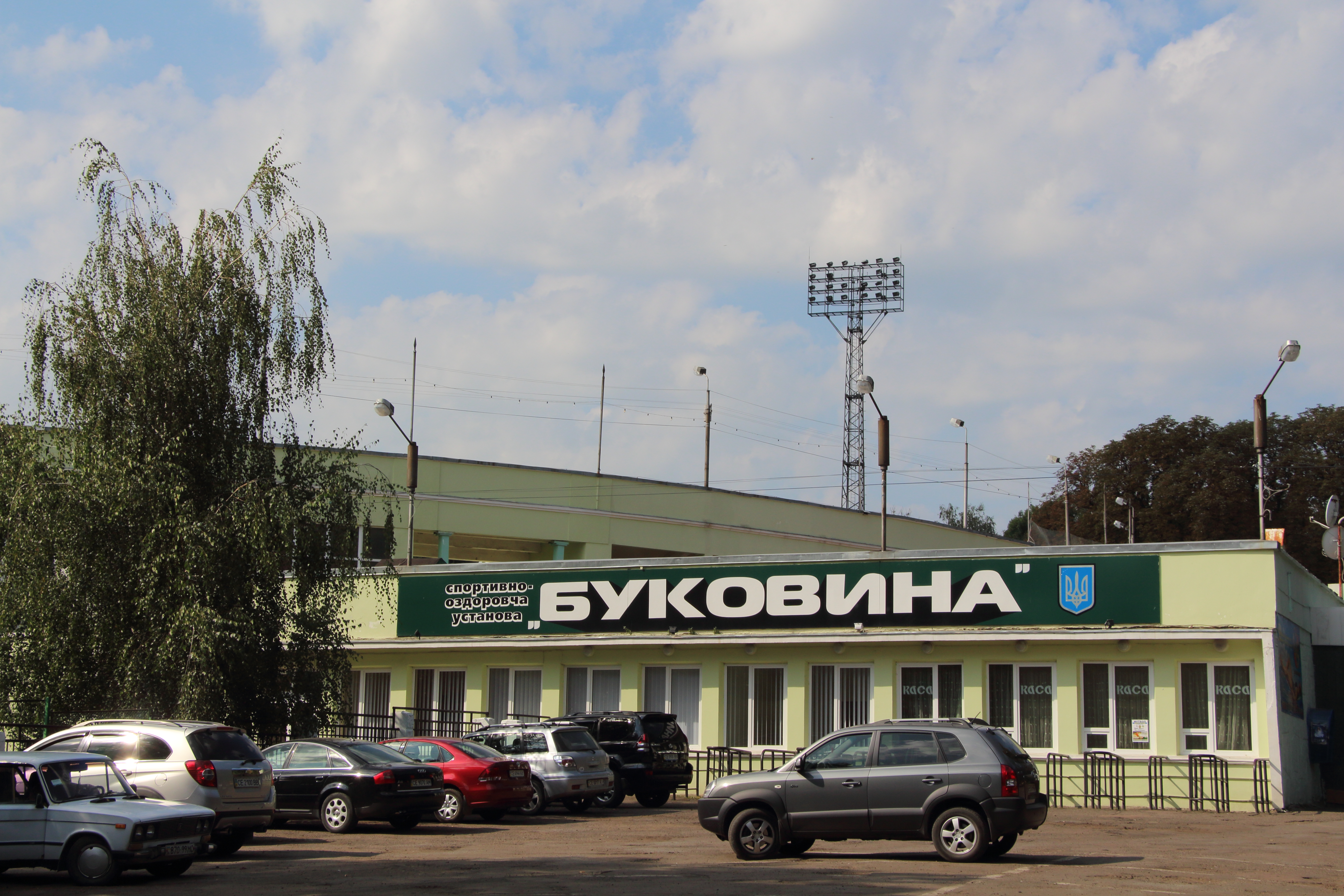
View from Holovna Street before renovation

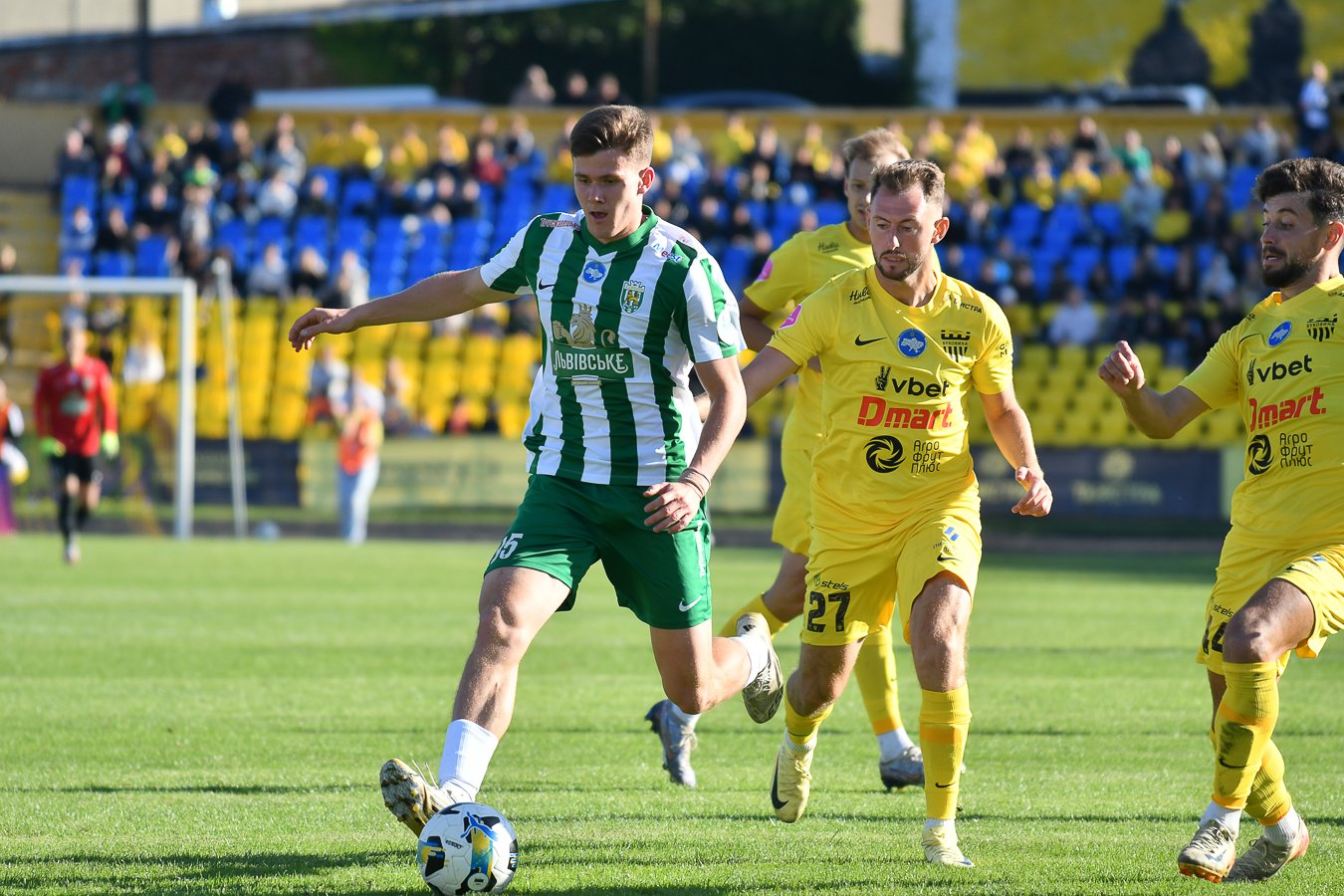
Ukrainian Cup. Bukovyna — Karpaty Lviv – 1-0
