= Seykhan Aliyev =

Ukrainian footballer (born 1991)

Personal information
- Full name: Seykhan Famalovych Aliyev
- Date of birth: 22 September 1991 (age 35)
- Place of birth: Urozhaine, Ukraine
- Height: 1.75 m (5 ft 9 in)
- Position: Midfielder

Youth career
- FC Avanhard Yevpatoria
- –2010: FC Stalker Zaozerne

Senior career*
Years	Team	Apps	(Gls)
2010–2015	Stal Dniprodzerzhynsk	98	(17)
2015–2020	FK Yevpatoriya		
- * Club domestic league appearances and goals as of 1 July 2020

Seykhan Famalovych Aliyev (Ukrainian: Сейхан Фамалович Алієв; born 22 September 1991) is a Ukrainian footballer who plays as a midfielder.

Aliyev was a product of the FC Avanhard Yevpatoria academy. In 2010, he signed a contract with FC Stal Dniprodzerzhynsk in the Ukrainian Second League, and made his debut in the Second League against FC Hirnyk Kryvyi Rih on 19 March 2010.
