= Luhansk Oblast Football Association =

The Luhansk Oblast Football Association is a football governing body in Luhansk Oblast, Ukraine. The association started as a member of the Regional Council of UAF and the collective member of the UAF itself.

== Championship ==
- 1939 Voroshylovsk
- 1940-43 World War II
- 1944 Voroshylovsk (2)
- 1946 Stal Voroshylovsk
- 1947 Stal Voroshylovsk (2)
- 1948 Stal Voroshylovsk (3)
- 1953 FC Shakhtar Kadiivka
- 1955 FC Shakhtar Sverdlovsk
- 1956 FC Shakhtar Sverdlovsk (2)
- 1957 FC Avanhard Voroshylovhrad
- 1958 FC Khimik Sieverodonetsk
- 1959 FC Donsoda Lysychansk
- 1960 FC Avanhard Luhansk (2)
- 1961 FC Avanhard Sverdlovsk (3)
- 1962 FC Metalurh Komunarsk
- 1963 FC Zorya Luhansk (3)
- 1964 FC Avanhard Rovenky
- 1965 Shakhtar Lysychansk
- 1966 FC Avanhard Rovenky (2)
- 1967 FC Avanhard Rovenky (3)
- 1968 Shakhtar Kirovsk
- 1969 Shakhtar Lysychansk
- 1970 Shakhtar Lysychansk (2)
- 1971 FC Shakhtar Sverdlovsk (4)
- 1978 FC Khimik Sieverodonetsk (2)
- 1979 FC Khimik Sieverodonetsk (3)
- 1980 Khimik Rubizhne
- 1982 FC Shakhtar Sverdlovsk (5)
- 1983 Sokil Rovenky
- 1984 Komunarets Komunarsk
- 1985 Nyva Svatove
- 1986 Metalurh Lutuhine
- 1987 FC Khimik Sieverodonetsk (4)
- 1988 FC Bidivelnyk Komunarsk
- 1989 Sokil Rovenky (2)
- 1990 FC Antratsyt
- 1991 FC Dynamo Luhansk
- =independence of Ukraine=
- 1992 (s) FC Dynamo Luhansk (2)
- 1992 (f) Urozhai Troitske
- 1993 (s) Metalurh Lutuhine (2)
- 1993 (f) Vahonobudivnyk-2 Stakhanov
- 1994 Hirnyk Bryanka
- 1995 Shakhtar Rovenky
- 1996 Shakhtar Krasnyi Luch
- 1997 Zolote-Almaz Pervomaisk
- 1998 FC Shakhtar Sverdlovsk (6)
- 1999 Ellada-Enerhiya Luhansk
- 2000 Ellada-Enerhiya Luhansk (2)
- 2001 FC Shakhtar Luhansk
- 2002 FC Shakhtar Sverdlovsk (7)
- 2003 FC Molniya Sieverodonetsk
- 2004 FC Ahata Luhansk
- 2005 FC Shakhtar Sverdlovsk (8)
- 2006 FC Shakhtar Sverdlovsk (9)
- 2007 FC Ahata Luhansk (2)
- 2008 FC Zolote-Almaz Pervomaisk (2)
- 2009 Lysychansk-Proletariy
- 2010 FC Popasna
- 2011 FC Zorya Luhansk
- 2012 FC Antratsyt (2)
- 2013 Shakhta Melnykova Lysychansk
- 2014 not held
- 2015 Shakhta Melnykova Lysychansk (2)
- 2016 Shakhta Melnykova Lysychansk (3)
- 2017 SC Zaria Rubizhne
- 2018 Skif Shulhynka
- 2019 Skif Shulhynka (2)
- 2020 Skif Shulhynka (3)
- 2021 Budivelnyk Lysychansk

=== Top winners ===
- 9 - FC Shakhtar (Avanhard) Sverdlovsk
- 4 - FC Khimik Sieverodonetsk
- 3 - 6 clubs (Stal V., Zorya L. (Avanhard V.), Avanhard R., Shakhtar L., Shakhta Melnykova, Skif)

== Cup winners ==
- 1969 Krasnodonvuhillia Krasnodon
- 2008 FC Stal-2 Alchevsk
- 2009 Krasnodonvuhillia Krasnodon
- 2011 FC Hirnyk Rovenky
- 2012 FC Zorya Luhansk
- 2013 FC Khimik Sieverodonetsk
- 2014 abandoned
- 2015 not held
- 2016 Melnikov Mine Lysychansk

== Donbas Championship ==
Along with the Luhansk Oblast football championship, better teams from Luhansk Oblast were taking part in united Donbas Championship since 2012. Despite a short interruption from 2015, selected Luhansk Oblast teams continued to play in the Donbas Championship.

- 2012 USK Rubin Donetsk
- 2013 USK Rubin Donetsk
- 2014 not held
- 2015 FC Slavkhlib Slovyansk
- 2016 FC Slavkhlib Slovyansk

== LNR ==
After the beginning of the War in Donbass, the local separatists conducted their own competition.

=== Championship ===
- 2015 Zaria-Stal Luhansk
- 2016 Dalevets Luhansk
- 2017 Dalevets Luhansk (2)
- 2018 Shakhter Sverdlovsk (based on FC Partizan Sverdlovsk)
- 2019 Zaria-Akademia Luhansk (2)
- 2020 Gornyak Rovenki
- 2021 Shakhter Sverdlovsk (2, based on FC Partizan Sverdlovsk)
- 2022 not held
- 2023 Dinamo Krasnodon

=== Cup winners ===
- 2015 Zaria-Stal Luhansk

Note: FC Shakhtar Sverdlovsk, according to the press center of the club, does not participate in the LNR competitions, while some media claimed it so.

== Professional clubs ==
- FC Zorya Luhansk (Dzerzhinets), 1939, 1964- (63 seasons)
- FC Dynamo Luhansk, 1947-1949 (3 seasons)
- FC Shakhtar Stakhanov (Stakhanovets, Vahonobudivnyk), 1948, 1949, 1957–1973, 1980–1986, 1991–1999 (35 seasons)
- Trudovye Rezervy Luhansk, 1949, 1957-1963 (8 seasons)
- FC Khimik Severodonetsk, 1960–1973, 1991–1998 (22 seasons)
- Komunarets Komunarsk (Metallurg), 1963-1970 (8 seasons)
- Shakhter Krasnyi Luch, 1965-1970 (6 seasons)
- FC Shakhtar Sverdlovsk, 1968–1970, 1995–1996, 2007–2014 (11 seasons)
- FC Avanhard Rovenky, 1968–1970 (3 seasons)
- FC Avanhard Antratsyt, 1969, 1970 (2 seasons)
- FC Shakhtar Kirovsk, 1970 (1 season)
- FC Stal Alchevsk, 1991–2015 (25 seasons)
- FC Molniya Severodonetsk, 2004–2005 (1 season)
- FC Komunalnyk Luhansk, 2007–2009 (2 seasons)

== Other clubs at national/republican level ==
Note: the list includes clubs that played at republican competitions before 1959 and the amateur or KFK competitions after 1964..

- Voroshilovgrad, 1936
- Starobilsk, 1936–1938
- Krasnyi Luch, 1936–1938
- Kadiivka, 1936, 1948
- Voroshylovsk, 1936, 1937
- Rubizhne, 1937
- Shakhtar Stakhanov/Kadiivka (Stakhanovets Serho), 1937, 1939, 1940, 1947, 1950–1956, 1975, 1977 – 1979, 1987 – 1990
- Dzerzhynets Voroshilovgrad, 1937, 1938, 1940, 1948, 1952
- Lenina Lysychansk/Verkhniy, 1938
- Shakhtar Lysychasnk (Stakhanovets), 1938, 1965, 1970 – 1972, 1980
- Metalurh Voroshylovsk (Stal), 1938–1940, 1948–1952, 1955, 1958, 1959
- Zenit Voroshilovgrad, 1939
- Khimik Rubizhne, 1948, 1949, 1958, 1959, 1975, 1976, 1980 – 1982
- Trudovi Rezervy Voroshilovgrad, 1950, 1951
- Avanhard Luhansk/Voroshilovgrad, 1954–1959
- Shakhtar Brianka, 1956–1959, 1971, 1972
- Khimik Severodonetsk, 1956–1959, 1979, 1980, 1988 – 1990
- Shakhtar Sverdlovsk, 1957–1959, 1971 – 1973, 1977 – 1994/95, 2003, 2006
- Dynamo Voroshilovgrad, 1946
- Shakhtar Krasnyi Luch, 1948, 1964, 1981, 1991, 1996/97
- Khimik Lysychansk/Verkhniy, 1949
- Shakhtar Krasnodon, 1958, 1970, 1971, 1997/98
- Avanhard Rovenky, 1966, 1967, 1980 – 1986, 1990 – 1993/94
- Shakhtar Kirovsk, 1968, 1969
- Avanhard Volodarsk, 1971
- Avanhard Antratsyt, 1971 – 1973
- Komunarets Komunarsk, 1972, 1976 – 1979, 1981, 1985 – 1988
- Impuls Severodonetsk, 1974
- Shakhtar Lutuhine, 1987 – 1990
- Stal Alchevsk, 1989, 1990
- FC Antratsyt, 1991, 1992/93
- Metalurh Lutuhine, 1991 – 1993/94
- Aiaks Krasnyi Luch, 1992/93 – 1994/95
- Hirnyk Bryanka, 1994/95
- Shakhtar Rovenky, 1995/96
- Zolote-Almaz Pervomaisk, 1998/99
- Shakhtar Luhansk, 1999 – 2002
- Fahot Krasnyi Luch, 2000
- Ekina Almazna, 2001
- Dynamo Stakhanov, 2002
- Molnia Severodonetsk, 2003
- FC Lysychansk, 2011
- FC Popasna, 2011

== Notable footballers ==
=== Soviet Union national football team ===
- Anatoliy Konkov
- Oleksandr Zavarov
- Sergey Andreyev
- Sergei Yuran
- Oleksandr Berezhnyi
- Eduard Mudrik
- Anatoliy Kuksov
- Yuriy Yeliseyev
- Viktor Onopko
- Volodymyr Malyhin
- Oleksandr Zhuravlyov
- Andriy Sidelnikov
- Anatoliy Shulzhenko

=== Ukraine national football team ===
- Oleh Shelayev
- Heorhiy Sudakov
- Denys Harmash
- Hennadiy Zubov
- Yevhen Selin
- Volodymyr Mykytin
- Oleh Suslov
- Oleksandr Horshkov
- Yuriy Dudnyk
- Dmytro Hrechyshkin
- Yuriy Hritsyna
- Pavel Pashayev
- Mykyta Kamenyuka
- Serhiy Pohodin

== See also ==
- FC Zarya Lugansk (2023)
- Luhansk People's Republic national football team
- Football Association of Donetsk Oblast
