= PFC Shakhtar Sverdlovsk =

Shakhtar Sverdlovsk
- Full name: Football Club Shakhtar Sverdlovsk
- Founded: 1939
- Dissolved: 2014
- Ground: Stadion Horyushkina, Sverdlovsk
- Capacity: 10,000
- Manager: Hennadiy Sushko
- League: Ukrainian Second League
- 2013–14: 5th

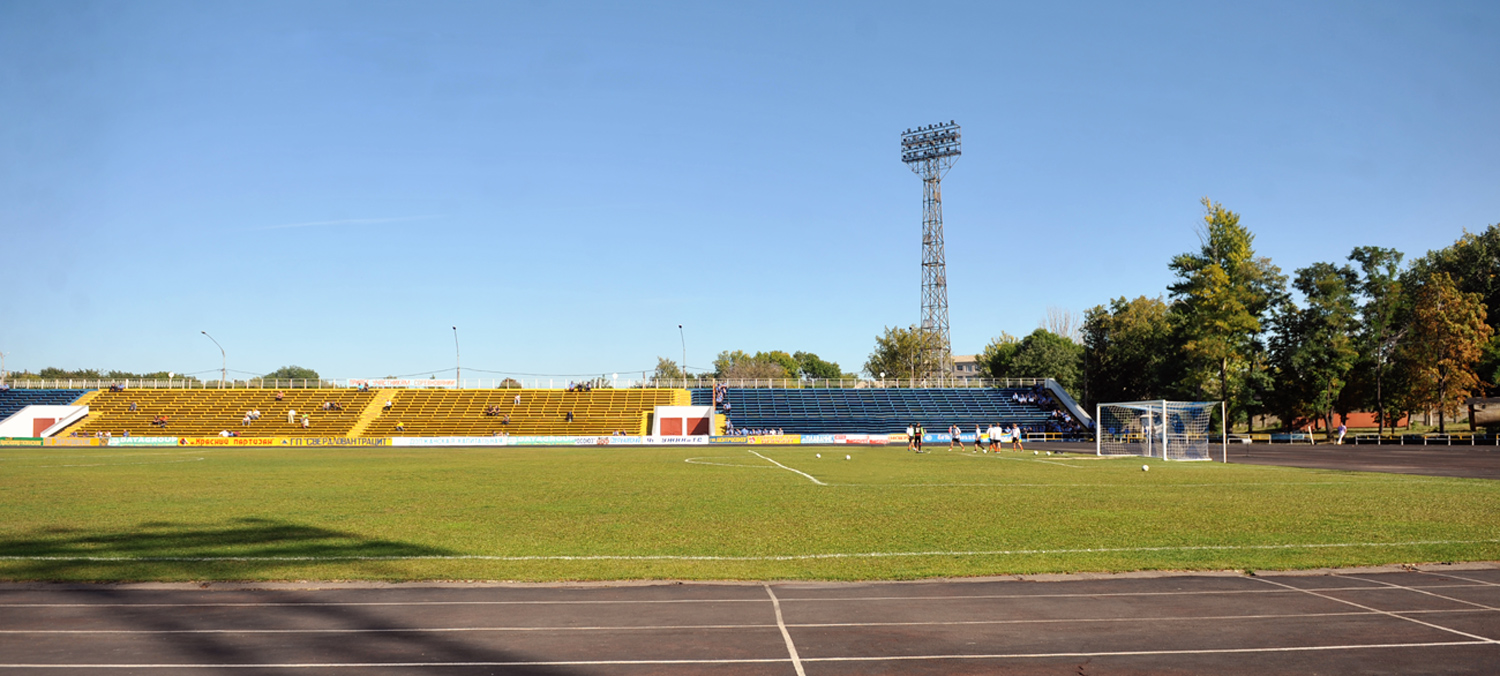
Stadion imeni Horyushkina

Shakhtar Sverdlovsk (Ukrainian: Шахтар Свердловськ) was a Ukrainian professional football club based in Luhansk oblast's Sverdlovsk city (Dovzhansk). The club competed in the Ukrainian Second League but was suspended after the 2013–14 amid the Russian aggression against Ukraine.

The club holds a record in number of seasons (23) fielding in national amateur competitions (Ukrainian Amateur Football Championship).

== History ==
Shakhtar Sverdlovsk was founded in 1939. The club represents State Mining Company "Sverdlovantratsyt" (Sverdlov Anthracite). After Ukrainian independence, the club competed in the Luhansk Oblast football competition. They performed well and decided to enter the professional ranks in 1995. This proved disastrous as the harsh economic conditions of the time took a toll and the club's administration decided that in the best interests of the club that they return to competing in the oblast league.

Between 1996 and 2006, while competing in the Luhansk Oblast league they won their 6th oblast championship. This improvement and an era of stability within the club gave them renewed interest in improving their classification level. After winning the Ukrainian Amateur Cup (Fourth level of Football in Ukraine) in 2006, the club decided to return to the professional ranks. Shakhtar Sverdlovsk was admitted to the Ukrainian Second League for the 2007–08 season.

Soon after the start of the Russo-Ukrainian War, the club suspended its operations. On the occupied territories in Dovzhansk, another Shakhtar Sverdlovsk was established based on the former amateur club Partizan. This club competes in the Commonwealth League since 2024. All matches are held outside the Luhansk Oblast, with matches being held in Crimea.

== Honors ==
- Ukrainian Druha Liha:
  - Runners up (1): 2012–13 (Group B)
- Ukrainian Amateur Football Championship
  - Winners (1): 2006
- Luhansk Oblast football championship
  - Winners (9): 1995, 1956, 1961, 1971, 1982, 1998, 2002, 2005, 2006

== League and cup history ==
Season	Div.	Pos.	Pl.	W	D	L	GS	GA	P	Domestic Cup	Europe		Notes
1979	4th	6	20	7	6	7	16	18	20				
1980	4th	8	22	7	7	8	29	21	21				
1981	4th	4	22	11	3	8	34	28	25				
1982	4th	2	14	8	4	2	29	9	20				
1983	4th	5	14	4	3	7	15	22	11				
1984	4th	6	14	4	4	6	14	19	12				
1985	4th	6	14	4	3	7	16	24	11				
1986	4th	3	14	8	1	5	20	14	17				
1987	4th	7	18	6	4	8	19	22	16				
1988	4th	9	22	7	4	11	31	28	18				
1989	4th	7	24	9	5	10	32	32	23				
1990	4th	10	30	8	7	15	39	53	23				
1991	4th	4	30	18	3	9	56	30	39				
1992–93	4th	2	26	17	4	5	53	23	38				
1993–94	4th	3	26	14	6	6	54	26	34				
1994–95	4th	2	30	20	3	7	69	32	63				
1995–96	3rd "B"	18	38	5	4	29	24	37	19	1/64 finals			Relegated
1997–2002	Shakhtar competes in the Luhansk Oblast competition												
2003	4th	3	8	2	1	5	6	12	7				
2003	4th	3	6	2	1	3	5	7	7				
2004–2005	Shakhtar competes in the Luhansk Oblast competition												
2006	4th	1	4	2	2	0	5	3	8		PL	Winner	
2006	4th	1	6	4	1	1	9	3	13		PL	Winner	
2006	4th	1	3	2	1	0	4	1	7		PL	Winner	
2007–08	3rd "B"	5	34	20	6	8	46	27	66	1/64 finals			
2008–09	3rd "B"	8	34	12	13	9	31	22	49	1/64 finals			
2009–10	3rd "B"	6	26	13	7	6	26	15	46	1/16 finals			
2010–11	3rd "B"	6	22	10	3	9	25	30	33	1/16 finals			
2011–12	3rd "B"	3	26	15	6	5	49	23	51	1/16 finals			
2012–13	3rd "B"	3	24	13	6	5	33	18	45	1/8 finals			
2012–13	3rd "2"	2	10	6	3	1	14	8	21	1/8 finals			Lost play-off
2013–14	3rd	5	36	19	10	7	48	29	67	1/8 finals			Suspended
Since 2014	Similar Shakhtar Sverdlovsk competes in football competitions of the Russian-occupied territories.												
