= Ivan Shariy =

Soviet and Ukrainian footballer (born 1957)

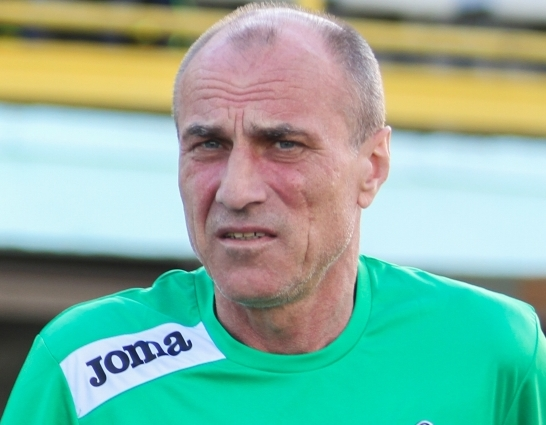
- Ivan Shariy, 2016

Personal information
- Full name: Ivan Hryhorovych Shariy
- Date of birth: 24 November 1957 (age 68)
- Place of birth: Poltava, Ukrainian SSR
- Height: 1.78 m (5 ft 10 in)
- Position: Forward

Youth career
- Poltava sports school

Senior career*
Years	Team	Apps	(Gls)
1974–1975	Kolos Poltava	33	(13)
1976–1978	Dynamo Kyiv	2	(0)
1978	→ Kolos Poltava	3	(1)
1978	Dinamo Minsk	19	(4)
1979	Metalurh Zaporizhia	43	(31)
1980	Dynamo Kyiv	0	(0)
1980	Metalurh Zaporizhia	32	(18)
1980–1985	Chornomorets Odesa	126	(25)
1986	Nistru Chisinau	33	(8)
1987–1989	Vorskla Poltava	137	(63)
1989–1990	Etar Veliko Tarnovo	12	(2)
1990	Vorskla Poltava	15	(9)
1991	Nyva Vinnytsia	38	(15)
1992	Hranyt Sharhorod	?	(3)
1993	Vorskla Poltava	4	(1)
1994	Birzula Kotovsk	13	(8)
1995–1999	Vorskla Poltava	82	(27)
1997	→ Vorskla-2 Poltava	4	(1)
1998	→ Kremin Kremenchuk (loan)	19	(10)
1998	→ Hirnyk-Sport Komsomolsk (loan)	2	(0)
1998	→ Vorskla-2 Poltava	8	(2)

Managerial career
- 1998: Vorskla Poltava (interim)
- 1998–2001: Vorskla-2 Poltava
- 2001–2003: Vorskla Poltava (assistant)
- 2006: Spartak Sumy
- 200?–2009: Horpynko sports school (director)
- 2009: Poltava (interim)
- * Club domestic league appearances and goals

Ivan Shariy (Ukrainian: Іван Григорович Шарій; born 24 November 1957) is a former Soviet and Ukrainian footballer and Ukrainian football manager.

== Biography ==
Native of Poltava, Shariy played football for almost a quarter of century. He started to play football at a local Poltava sports school. Viktor Nosov who at that time was a head coach of the Vorskla Poltava's predecessor Kolos invited Shariy to the team of masters (Note: a team of masters was an official status of professional clubs in the Soviet football due to specifics of the Soviet economic system) that played at the Soviet Second League when Shariy just turned 16. Shariy debuted coming out as a substitute during the game against Avtomobilist (later better known as FC Polissya Zhytomyr). Soon he was noticed by scouts of the Soviet Top League from Dynamo Kyiv and CSKA Moscow and in 1976 joined the Kyivan team.

Due to strong competition for a spot on the main team and the reserve squad, Shariy soon left Dynamo in Kiev for another in Minsk that was coached by Oleh Bazylevych helping the main Belarusian team with promotion to the Soviet Top League. Following promotion of Dinamo Minsk, Shariy decided to stay and continue to play at the Soviet First League joining FC Metalurh Zaporizhia for which he scored a notable number of goals. After couple of seasons Shariy tried to return to Kiev and played for Dynamo of Valeriy Lobanovsky few games in the Soviet Cup, but later joined another Soviet Top League team, Chornomorets Odesa, that was coached by Nikita Simonyan. In Chornomorets Shariy spent the next six seasons. During his stay in Odessa Shariy continued to receive offers from PFC CSKA Moscow, particularly from Sergei Shaposhnikov.

Following Chornomorets, the Shariy's career took a dive and in late 1980s he played for lower tier clubs Nistru Kishinev and the recently revived Vorskla Poltava (in place of Kolos) from native Poltava. In 1990 Shariy left for Bulgaria where he played for Etar Veliko Tarnovo which placed third in the national top league that season. During that season he played alongside such players like Krasimir Balakov, Ilian Kiriakov, and Tsanko Tsvetanov. Soon after return from Bulgaria, Shariy continued to play for few seasons in lower tiers before the dissolution of the Soviet Union and in 1992 decided to retire from professional football. He played at amateur level for Hranit Sharhorod, Birzuli Podilsk and Velta Poltava. He was a playing manager in Velta and won the Poltava Oblast championship and cup and was named in team of the year in 1995.

After almost three year break from professional football in 1995 the Vorskla head coach Viktor Pozhechevskyi invited Shariy who was 39 years old to the club where he contributed to Vorskla's win of the Persha Liha (tier 2). After few seasons he returned to amateurs where he continued to play until around 2015.

Shariy also played couple of games at continental club competitions, the UEFA Cup, at first in the 1985–86 UEFA Cup for Chornomorets Odesa that represented the Soviet Union and hosted German Werder Bremen when he came out to substitute Igor Savelyev on the 66th minute. The second his game Shariy played on August 12, 1997 for FC Vorskla Poltava which represented Ukraine in away game against Belgian Anderlecht coming on as a substitute for Serhiy Chuichenko on the 83rd minute.

On 18 May 1999, Shariy set a record during the Ukrainian Premier League game against SC Mykolaiv for coming out on the field at the age of 41. The Ukrainian First League top scorer Serhiy Chuichenko considered Shariy to be the best footballer in history of Poltava football.

On 5 June 2009, he was appointed as an interim head coach of FC Poltava, while Shariy was to be assisted by Oleh Morhun. Shariy who until his appointed was a director of the Ivan Horpynko sports school in Poltava replaced the FC Poltava head coach Oleksandr Omelchuk.

== Career statistics ==
=== Club ===
Appearances and goals by club, season and competition
Club	Season	League			Cup		Europe		Other		Total	
Club	Season	Division	Apps	Goals	Apps	Goals	Apps	Goals	Apps	Goals	Apps	Goals
Kolos Poltava	1974	Soviet Second League	17	2	–		–		–		17	2
Kolos Poltava	1975	Soviet Second League	16	11	–		–		–		16	11
Kolos Poltava	Total		33	13	0	0	0	0	0	0	33	13
Dinamo Kiev	1976 (sp)	Soviet Top League	2	0	–		–		–		2	0
Dinamo Kiev	1976 (au)	Soviet Top League	–		–		–		–		–	
Dinamo Kiev	1977	Soviet Top League	–		–		–		–		–	
Dinamo Kiev	Total		2	0	0	0	0	0	0	0	2	0
Kolos Poltava	1978	Soviet Second League	3	1	–		–		–		3	1
Dinamo Minsk	1978	Soviet First League	19	4	2	0	–		–		21	4
Metallurg Zaporozhie	1979	Soviet First League	43	31	5	1	–		–		48	32
Metallurg Zaporozhie	1980	Soviet First League	32	18	–		–		–		32	18
Metallurg Zaporozhie	Total		75	49	5	1	0	0	0	0	80	50
Dinamo Kiev	1980	Soviet Top League	–		4	0	–		–		4	0
Chernomorets Odessa	1980	Soviet Top League	3	0	–		–		–		3	0
Chernomorets Odessa	1981	Soviet Top League	24	7	7	4	–		–		31	11
Chernomorets Odessa	1982	Soviet Top League	30	6	2	0	–		–		32	6
Chernomorets Odessa	1983	Soviet Top League	24	3	–		–		–		24	3
Chernomorets Odessa	1984	Soviet Top League	26	6	4	2	–		–		30	8
Chernomorets Odessa	1985	Soviet Top League	9	3	–		1	0	–		10	3
Chernomorets Odessa	Total		116	25	13	6	1	0	0	0	130	31
Nistru Kishinev	1986	Soviet First League	33	8	2	0	–		–		35	8
Vorskla Poltava	1987	Soviet Second League	49	22	–		–		–		49	22
Vorskla Poltava	1988	Soviet Second League	45	20	–		–		–		45	20
Vorskla Poltava	1989	Soviet Second League	43	21	–		–		–		43	21
Vorskla Poltava	Total		137	63	0	0	0	0	0	0	137	63
Etar Veliko Tarnovo	1989–90	„А“ RFG	12	2	4	2	–		–		16	4
Vorskla Poltava	1990	Soviet Second League	15	9	–		–		–		15	9
Niva Vinnitsa	1991	Soviet Second League	38	15	2	1	–		–		40	16
Vorskla Poltava	1992–93	Ukrainian First League	4	1	–		–		–		4	1
Vorskla Poltava	1995–96	Ukrainian First League	36	18	2	2	–		–		38	20
Vorskla Poltava	Total		36	18	2	2	0	0	0	0	38	20
Vorskla Poltava	1996–97	Vyshcha Liha	29	8	4	2	–		–		33	10
Vorskla Poltava	1997–98	Vyshcha Liha	8	0	1	0	1	0	–		10	0
Vorskla Poltava	1998–99	Vyshcha Liha	9	1	2	0	–		–		11	1
Vorskla Poltava	Total		46	9	7	2	1	0	0	0	54	11
Kremin Kremenchuk (loan)	1997–98	Ukrainian First League	19	10	–		–		–		19	10
Hirnyk-Sport Komsomolsk (loan)	1997–98	Ukrainian Second League	2	0	–		–		–		2	0
Vorskla-2 Poltava	1997–98	Ukrainian Second League	5	1	–		–		–		5	1
Vorskla-2 Poltava	1998–99	Ukrainian Second League	8	2	–		–		–		8	2
Vorskla-2 Poltava	Total		13	3	0	0	0	0	0	0	13	3

== Sources ==
- Lomov, Anatolii; Stadnychenko, Oleksandr (2009), 100 Років Полтавському Футболу [100 Years of Poltava Football] (in Ukrainian), Poltava: Poltava, ISBN 978-966-97035-0-7
- Lomov, Anatolii; Kryvorotko, Serhii (2010), Энциклопедия Полтавского Футбола (1909-2010) [Encyclopedia of Poltava Football (1909-2010)] (in Russian), Poltava: OOO "ASMI", ISBN 978-966-182-118-6
