= Kremin-Arena =

Stadium in Kremenchuk, Ukraine

Kremin Arena
- Кремінь-Арена імені Олега Бабаєва
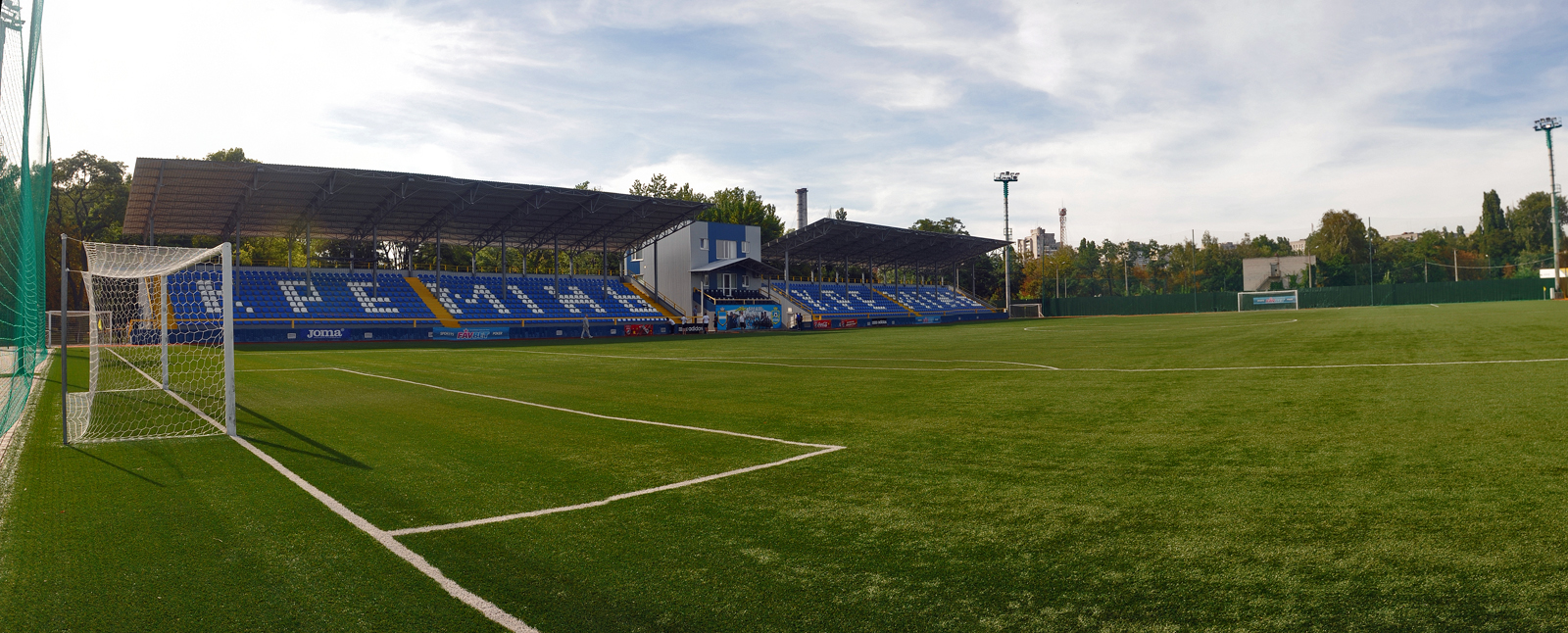
- Interactive map of Kremin Arena
- Full name: Oleh Babaiev Kremin Arena
- Location: Chkalova Street, 6-A Kremenchuk, Ukraine
- Coordinates: 49°4′38.09″N 33°25′43.06″E
- Owner: Kremenchuk
- Capacity: 1,566
- Surface: Artificial
- Record attendance: 2,200 vs. FC Dynamo Kyiv (21 September 2011, Ukrainian Cup)
- Field size: 105 m × 68 m (344 ft × 223 ft)

Construction
- Groundbreaking: 2007
- Built: 2007–2010
- Opened: 19 November 2010; 15 years ago
- Renovated: 2019
- Cost: ₴ 12,000,000
- Architect: Yehor Zymin

Tenants
- FC Kremin Kremenchuk (2011–present); FC Kremin-2 Kremenchuk (2019–2024); WFC Lider Kobeliaky (2022–2023)

Kremin-Arena (Ukrainian: Кремінь-Арена імені Олега Бабаєва) is a football stadium in Kremenchuk, Ukraine. It is the home stadium of FC Kremin Kremenchuk, its Second team, and is named after the club's former honorary president, Oleh Babaiev (1965–2014). The full name of the stadium is Oleh Babaiev Kremin-Arena.

== Construction and design ==
Polytechnic Stadium, home stadium to Kremin was not being repaired and the club could not hold its league matches in it. Kremin was forced to play at Yunist Stadium in Horishni Plavni. Kremenchuk State University, owner of Polytechnic Stadium, was unwilling to sell it to Kremin and did not have funds to repair it. In January 2007, these events prompted Oleh Babaiev President of FC Kremin and Chairman Kremenchukmyaso, which was also a sponsor of FC Kremin to plan for a new stadium for the club. He also managed to secure support from Kremenchuk mayor Mykola Hlukhov. Ehor Zymin was chosen as the architect. The location for the stadium was chosen in city park Miskyi sad. The stadium was designed to comply with requirements set by the Ukrainian Association of Football for Ukrainian Second League.

Construction on the stadium began in 2007, with the original plan to have it finished by the end of year. In January 2009, Babaiev stated that the stadium would be open in spring, while fully finished by the end of 2009. The proposed opening date was later set for fall 2009. There was a high-voltage cable running through site of the future stadium. In 2008 it was transferred, and construction could continue. Construction delays pushed the opening to 29 September 2009. However that date was not met, and the stadium opened on 19 November 2010. The original budget was estimated at ₴ 2,500,000. The cost for construction however, was ₴ 12,000,000. Part of the finances came from the Kremenchuk city budget, other parts came from the Poltava Oblast budget and from the Ministry of Finance. Also part of the funds, ₴ 3,000,000 came from sponsors. These included club sponsor Kremenchukmyaso, KrAZ who gave 550,000, Ukrtatnafta who gave 100,000, wheel plant, Kremenchug Plant of Road Machines ("Kredmash") and tannery. Kremenchuk mayor Mykola Hlukhov, in January 2010, stated that finances from the Government of Ukraine and from the Poltava Oblast budget never arrived. Later in the year funds from the Poltava Oblast budget were received and with additional money from the city, construction was completed.

== Opening ==
The opening ceremony was held on 19 November 2010. Professional Football League of Ukraine executive director Serhiy Makarov and Kremenchuk Mayor and Honorary President of Kremin Oleh Babaiev were the main officials to give speeches. An exhibition match between veterans of Kremin and FC Dynamo Kyiv was held. It finished with Dynamo winning 3:1.

Kremin's first match at the stadium was a 1–0 victory in a 2011–12 Ukrainian Second League fixture on 9 April 2011 against FC Shakhtar-3 Donetsk.

== Special events and information ==
During the 2011–12 Ukrainian Cup season, Kremin was drawn against FC Dynamo Kyiv. For the match to be held on 21 September 2011, stadium was temporary expanded by adding 700 extra seats. Unian citing interview with honorary president Oleh Babaiev, gave number of extra seats as 750. Reported attendance was 2,200.

Kremenchuk Mayor and Honorary President of Kremin Oleh Babaiev was shot dead in his car in front of his house on July 26, 2014. This led to City Council to adopt a resolution on 27 August 2014, renaming the city to Oleh Babaiev Kremin Arena.

Having an artificial surface, in the summer of 2017 the stadium was accepted by the Professional Football League to host games of the Ukrainian First League.

During the summer of 2019, the artificial surface was replaced in accordance with the Regional Program for the Development of Physical Culture and Sports for 2017–2020. The project was completed in October. Work was performed by TOV Global View. Poltava Oblast budget financed the ₴ 4, 500,000 repairs. This forces Kremin to hold its home games at Lokomotyv Stadium in Poltava. In 2020 there was of an outstanding debt of ₴ 287,678 that the Kremenchuk City Council had to cover.

== Russian invasion of Ukraine ==
On 27 June 2022, during the Kremenchuk shopping mall attack by the Russian Armed Forces, the Kremin-Arena infrastructure and club bus suffered some damage. All damage was repaired by the end of July 2022.

== Structure and facilities ==
Proposed seating was 1500. However there are varying numbers for current seating. 1500, 1529, and 1566.

The stadium has two blocks: the first is for spectators and includes ticket offices, toilets, buffet, press box, VIP stand. The second one is for players and holds dressing rooms, showers, first aid station and doping control rooms.

During the opening ceremony for the stadium on 19 November 2010, Babaiev promised that a second stand will be built for another 1,500 seats. A promise he repeated in 2012.

Expansion to stadium was planned in 2013. Kremenchuk City Council passed a bill on non-school educational institutions, which included a provision to build a second stand at the cost of ₴ 4,500,000.

Another expansion was announced by Kremenchuk City Council on 2 March 2017. Proposal included volleyball, basketball, tennis and Mini football.

It is a Ukrainian Association of Football Category 2 stadium. This category allows stadiums to hold matches in the First, Second leagues, and matches of the Ukrainian Cup for the Round of 32 and the Round of 16.

== Other uses ==
=== Football usage ===
Kremin has at least 12 youth groups that use the stadium. Also, various city-wide matches take place. The yearly Mayor's Cup amateur competition is held at the stadium. In 2018, a team from Svishtov, Bulgaria took part in the competition, the first international participant.

Kremenchuk city Cup in memory of Hryhorii Chychykov 2022 took place in the stadium. The final was held on 8 September 2022.

On 11 November 2011, a friendly match between city council members of Kremenchuk and Kharkiv was held as part of preparations and festivities for UEFA Euro 2012.

In honor of 20th anniversary of Ukrainian Armed Forces Day, on 6 December 2011, a match was held between city council members of Kremenchuk and soldiers from 107th Rocket Artillery Brigade. A year later the match was repeated.

A few finals for amateur competitions in Poltava Oblast were also held at the arena. Such as the Poltava Oblast Cup in 2020 and Super Cup in 2021. Annual winter amateur tournament Pozhechevskyi Cup featured some matches in the arena for seasons 2022 and 2023.

WFC Lider Kobeliaky a Ukrainian Women's League First League club from Kobeliaky, also plays their home games at the stadium starting 2022-23 season.

=== Non-football usage ===
It was proposed that Kremenchuk City Council cession on 23 April 2020, would take place in the stadium due to meeting restrictions caused by COVID-19 pandemic. However this idea was abandoned.

Aside from sporting uses, several concerts have been played at Kremin-Arena. Okean Elzy in 2016 and Kvartal 95 Studio in 2019.

== Records ==
Kremin did not lose a league match at Kremin-Arena during the 2018-19, 2019-20 and 2020-21 seasons. Kremin's longest unbeaten streak at home extended from 14 April 2018 to 29 July 2020, a period encompassing 23 games which lasted for 27 month. This did not include games played at Yunist and Locomotiv stadiums.

== Gallery ==
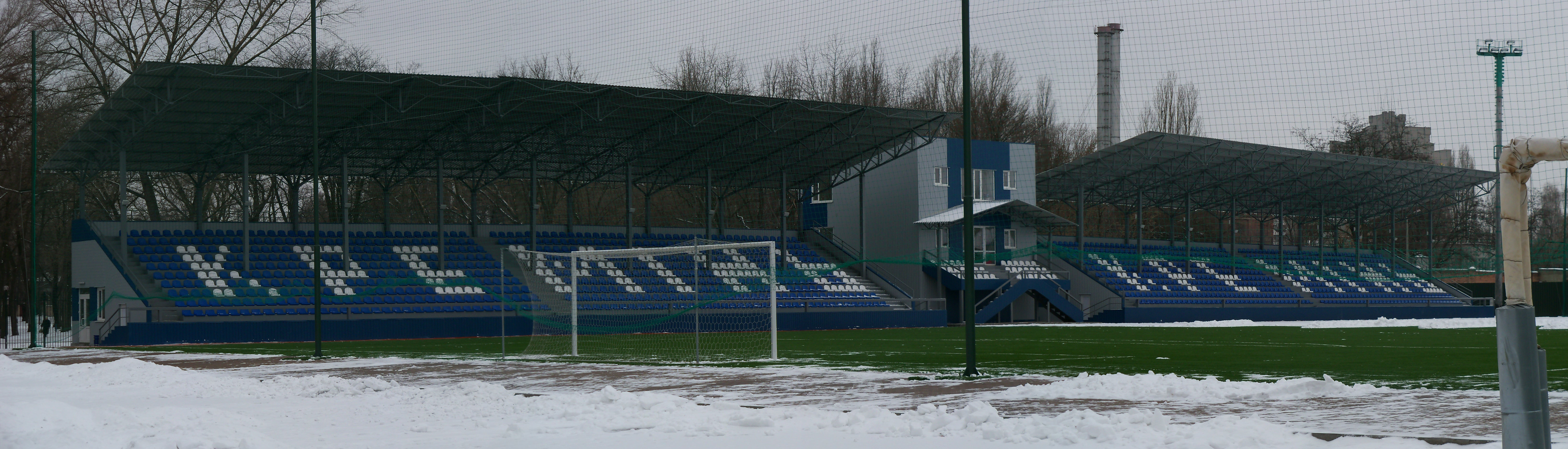
Panorama of stands

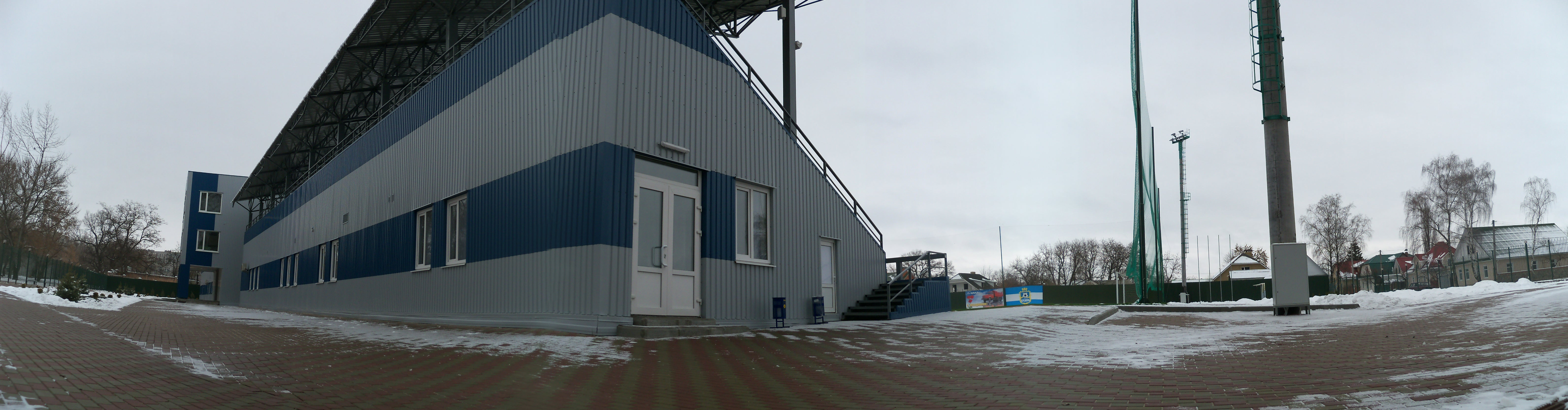
Panorama at the entrance to the stadium
