= Anatolii Momot =

Soviet and Ukrainian football manager

Anatoliy Momot
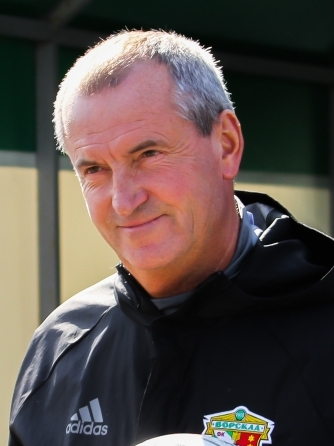

Personal information
- Full name: Anatoliy Yuriyovych Momot
- Date of birth: 12 April 1958 (age 68)
- Place of birth: Dykanka, Ukrainian SSR

Managerial career
- Years: Team
- 1987–????: Hrebinka Sports school
- 1994–1996: FC Lokomotyv Hrebinka
- 1996–2000: Fakel Varva
- 2000–2002: Pyryatyn
- 2002–2004: Vorskla-2 Poltava
- 2004–2005: Vorskla Poltava (coach of reserves)
- 2005–2007: Vorskla Poltava (assistant coach)
- 2007: Vorskla Poltava (caretaker)
- 2007–2013: Vorskla Poltava (assistant coach)
- 2013–2014: Vorskla Poltava (caretaker)
- 2014–2019: Vorskla Poltava (assistant coach)

Anatoliy Yuriyovych Momot (Ukrainian: Анатолій Юрійович Момот; born 12 April 1958 in Dykanka) is a Soviet and Ukrainian football coach.
