= 1967–68 Soviet Cup =

1967–68 Cup of USSR in Football
Кубок СССР

Tournament details
- Country: Soviet Union
- Dates: March 16, 1967 – November 8, 1968
- Teams: 107 (final stage)

Final positions
- Champions: Torpedo Moscow
- Runners-up: Pakhtakor Tashkent

The 1967–68 Soviet Cup was an association football cup competition of the Soviet Union. The winner of the competition, Torpedo Moscow qualified for the continental tournament.

== Participating teams ==
Enter in Final round		Enter in Qualification round		
Class A		Class B		
Group 1 20/20 teams ✓ Dinamo Kiev; ✓ Spartak Moscow; ✓ Torpedo Moscow; ✓ CSKA Moscow; ✓ Dinamo Moscow; ✓ Dinamo Minsk; ✓ Dinamo Tbilisi; ✓ Chernomorets Odessa; ✓ Neftchi Baku; ✓ Lokomotiv Moscow; ✓ Zenit Leningrad; ✓ SKA Rostov-na-Donu; ✓ Zaria Lugansk; ✓ Shakhter Donetsk; ✓ Kairat Alma-Ata; ✓ Ararat Yerevan; ✓ Pakhtakor Tashkent; ✓ Krylya Sovetov Kuibyshev; ✓ Torpedo Kutaisi; ✓ Dinamo Kirovabad	Group 2 78/84 teams ✓ Karpaty Lvov; ✓ SKA Kiev; ✓ SKA Odessa; ✓ Avtomobilist Zhitomir; ✓ Selstroi Poltava; ✓ Dinamo Leningrad; ✓ SKA Lvov; ✓ Daugava Riga; ✓ Moldova Kishinev; ✓ Lokomotiv Vinnitsa; ✗ Azovets Zhdanov; ✓ Khimik Severodonetsk; ✓ Lokomotiv Kaluga; ✓ Metallurg Tula; ✓ Volga Kalinin; ✓ Zhalgiris Vilnius; ✓ Krivbass Krivoi Rog; ✓ Baltika Kaliningrad; ✓ Neman Grodno; ✓ Dinamo Tallinn; ✓ Spartak Gomel ✓ Sudostoitel Nikolayev; ✓ Metallist Kharkov; ✓ Dnepr Dnepropetrovsk; ✓ Zvezda Kirovograd; ✓ Trud Voronezh; ✓ Tavriya Simferopol; ✓ Kuban Krasnodar; ✓ Sokol Saratov; ✓ Metallurg Zaporozhye; ✓ Shinnik Yaroslavl; ✓ Lokomotiv Kherson; ✓ Rostselmash Rostov-na-Donu; ✓ Tekstilschik Ivanovo; ✓ Dinamo Stavropol; ✓ Avangard Zheltye Vody; ✓ Spartak Nalchik; ✓ Metallurg Kuibyshev; ✓ Dnepr Kremenchuk; ✗ Metallurg Lipetsk; ✗ Zvezda Ryazan; ✓ SKCF Sevastopol ✓ Uralmash Sverdlovsk; ✓ Spartak Ordzhonikidze; ✓ Dinamo Makhachkala; ✓ Volga Gorkiy; ✓ Rubin Kazan; ✓ Lokomotiv Chelyabinsk; ✓ Dinamo Batumi; ✓ Lokomotiv Tbilisi; ✓ Volgar Astrakhan; ✗ Zenit Izhevsk; ✓ Polad Sumgait; ✓ Zvezda Perm; ✓ Traktor Volgograd; ✓ Spartak Yoshkar-Ola; ✗ Torpedo Taganrog; ✓ Volga Ulyanovsk; ✓ Stroitel Ufa; ✓ Meshakhte Tkibuli; ✓ Terek Grozny; ✓ Shirak Leninakan; ✓ Metallurg Magnitogorsk ✓ Irtysh Omsk; ✓ Kuzbass Kemerovo; ✓ SKA Khabarovsk; ✓ Politodel Tashkent Oblast; ✓ Stroitel Ashkhabad; ✓ Neftianik Fergana; ✓ Tomles Tomsk; ✓ SKA Chita; ✓ Energetik Dushanbe; ✓ Temp Barnaul; ✓ Zarafshan Navoi; ✓ Shakhter Karaganda; ✓ Luch Vladivostok; ✓ Aeroflot Irkutsk; ✓ Vostok Ust-Kamenogorsk; ✗ Selenga Ulan-Ude; ✓ Alga Frunze; ✓ Rassvet Krasnoyarsk; ✓ Metallurg Chimkent; ✓ SKA Novosibirsk; ✓ Pamir Leninabad	RSFSR I (1967 – 18/18) ✓ Dinamo Briansk; ✓ Neman Grodno; ✓ Zvezda Serpukhov; ✓ Spartak Brest; ✓ Znamia Truda Orekhovo-Zuyevo; ✓ Spartak Ryazan; ✓ Spartak Belgorod; ✓ Khimik Novomoskovsk; ✓ Iskra Smolensk; ✓ Granitas Klapeida; ✓ Znamia Noginsk; ✓ Trudovye Rezervy Kursk; ✓ Spartak Oryol; ✓ Avangard Kolomna; ✓ Zveiniyeks Liyepaya; ✓ Spartak Tambov; ✓ Dvina Vitebsk; ✓ Spartak Mogilyov	RSFSR II (1967 – 19/19) ✓ Volga Ulyanovsk; ✓ Spartak Kostroma; ✓ Metallurg Lipetsk; ✓ Metallurg Cherepovets; ✓ Khimik Dzerzhinsk; ✓ Torpedo Podolsk; ✓ Traktor Vladimir; ✓ Onezhets Petrozavodsk; ✓ Saturn Rybinsk; ✓ Sever Murmansk; ✓ Dinamo Vologda; ✓ Chaika Zelenodolsk; ✓ Mashinostroitel Balashikha; ✓ Torpedo Lyubertsy; ✓ Kovrovets Kovrov; ✓ Bolshevik Leningrad; ✓ Spartak Saransk; ✓ Torpedo Pavlovo; ✓ Energiya Cheboksary	RSFSR III (1967 – 19/20) ✓ Polad Sumgait; ✓ Volgar Astrakhan; ✓ Metallurg Kuibyshev; ✓ Torpedo Taganrog; ✓ Tekstilschik Mingechaur; ✓ Progress Kamensk-Shakhtinskiy; ✓ Tyazhmash Syzran; ✓ Shakhter Shakhty; ✓ Energiya Volzhskiy; ✗ Urozhai Slaviansk-na-Kubani; ✓ Energiya Novocherkassk; ✓ Urozhai Pavlovskaya; ✓ Torpedo Armavir; ✓ Khimmashavets Penza; ✓ Trud Toliatti; ✓ Kalitva Belaya Kalitva; ✓ Khimik Balakovo; ✓ Urozhai Svetlograd; ✓ Trud Engels; ✓ Uralan Elista
Group 1 20/20 teams ✓ Dinamo Kiev; ✓ Spartak Moscow; ✓ Torpedo Moscow; ✓ CSKA Moscow; ✓ Dinamo Moscow; ✓ Dinamo Minsk; ✓ Dinamo Tbilisi; ✓ Chernomorets Odessa; ✓ Neftchi Baku; ✓ Lokomotiv Moscow; ✓ Zenit Leningrad; ✓ SKA Rostov-na-Donu; ✓ Zaria Lugansk; ✓ Shakhter Donetsk; ✓ Kairat Alma-Ata; ✓ Ararat Yerevan; ✓ Pakhtakor Tashkent; ✓ Krylya Sovetov Kuibyshev; ✓ Torpedo Kutaisi; ✓ Dinamo Kirovabad		RSFSR IV (1967 – 20/20) ✓ Dinamo Makhachkala; ✓ Spartak Kislovodsk; ✓ Dila Gori; ✓ Lori Kirovakan; ✓ Mashinostroitel Pyatigorsk; ✓ Dinamo Sukhumi; ✓ Urozhai Krymsk; ✓ Araks Yerevan; ✓ Urozhai Maikop; ✓ Tsement Novorossiysk; ✓ Urozhai Derbent; ✓ Guria Lanchkhuti; ✓ Shukura Kobuleti; ✓ Metallurg Rustavi; ✓ Lernagorts Kafan; ✓ Sevan Oktemberyan; ✓ Magaroeli Chiatura; ✓ Inguri Zugdidi; ✓ Alazani Gurdzhaani; ✓ Kolkhida Poti	RSFSR V (1967 – 19/19) ✓ Zenit Izhevsk; ✓ Spartak Yoshkar-Ola; ✓ Metallurg Magnitogorsk; ✓ Metallurg Zlatoust; ✓ Kalininets Sverdlovsk; ✓ Dinamo Kirov; ✓ Khimik Salavat; ✓ Neftianik Bugulma; ✓ Neftianik Tyumen; ✓ Lokomotiv Orenburg; ✓ Kauchuk Sterlitamak; ✓ Zauralets Kurgan; ✓ Neftianik Oktyabrskiy; ✓ Khimik Berezniki; ✓ Aktyubenets Aktyubinsk; ✓ Burovik Almetyevsk; ✓ Torpedo Miass; ✓ Uralets Nizhniy Tagil; ✓ Avtomobilist Kustanay	RSFSR VI (1967 – 18/18) ✓ SKA Chita; ✓ Shakhter Kiselyovsk; ✓ Angara Irkutsk; ✓ Tsementnik Semipalatinsk; ✓ Selenga Ulan-Ude; ✓ Okean Vladivostok; ✓ Metallurg Novokuznetsk; ✓ Lokomotiv Krasnoyarsk; ✓ Shakhter Prokopyevsk; ✓ Rybak Nakhodka; ✓ Amur Blagoveschensk; ✓ Neftianik Omsk; ✓ Irtysh Pavlodar; ✓ Start Angarsk; ✓ Avangard Komsomolsk-na-Amure; ✓ Torpedo Rubtsovsk; ✓ Pursei Bratsk; ✓ Progress Biysk
Group 1 20/20 teams ✓ Dinamo Kiev; ✓ Spartak Moscow; ✓ Torpedo Moscow; ✓ CSKA Moscow; ✓ Dinamo Moscow; ✓ Dinamo Minsk; ✓ Dinamo Tbilisi; ✓ Chernomorets Odessa; ✓ Neftchi Baku; ✓ Lokomotiv Moscow; ✓ Zenit Leningrad; ✓ SKA Rostov-na-Donu; ✓ Zaria Lugansk; ✓ Shakhter Donetsk; ✓ Kairat Alma-Ata; ✓ Ararat Yerevan; ✓ Pakhtakor Tashkent; ✓ Krylya Sovetov Kuibyshev; ✓ Torpedo Kutaisi; ✓ Dinamo Kirovabad		Ukraine Zakarpatie (1968 – 16) ✓ Dinamo Khmelnitskiy; ✓ Karpaty Mukachevo; ✓ Energiya Novaya Kakhovka; ✓ Shakhter Kadiyevka; ✓ Spartak Ivano-Frankovsk; ✓ Bukovina Chernovtsy; ✓ Avangard Ternopol; ✓ Avangard Makeyeka; ✓ Dnepr Cherkassy; ✓ Start Dzerzhinsk; ✓ Verkhovina Uzhgorod; ✓ Shakhter Chervonograd; ✓ Goryn Rovno; ✓ Shakhter Novovolynsk; ✓ Torpedo Lutsk; ✓ Neftianik Drogobich Ukraine I (did not play 6) ✗ Shakhter Aleksandriya; ✗ Stroiindustriya Beltsy; ✗ Dnestr Tiraspol; ✗ Nistrul Bendery; ✗ Podolie Kamenets-Podolskiy; ✗ Dunayets Izmail	Ukraine Crimea (1968 – 13) ✓ Spartak Sumy; ✓ Desna Chernigov; ✓ Prometei Dneprodzerzhinsk; ✓ Kolos Akimovka; ✓ Avangard Rovenki; ✓ Avangard Kerch; ✓ Sitall Konstantinovka; ✓ Torpedo Kharkov; ✓ Lokomotiv Donetsk; ✓ Progress Berdichev; ✓ Torpedo Berdyansk; ✓ Trubnik Nikopol; ✓ Shakhter Sverdlovsk Ukraine II (did not play 8) ✗ Kommunarets Kommunarsk; ✗ Shakhter Gorlovka; ✗ Ugolek Krasnoarmeisk; ✗ Avangard Kramatorsk; ✗ Lokomotiv Dnepropetrovsk; ✗ Shakhter Krasny Luch; ✗ Industriya Yanakievo; ✗ Shakhter Torez	Central Asia and Kazakhstan (15/22) ✓ Sverdlovets Tashkent Oblast; ✓ Ok Oltyn Andizhan Oblast; ✓ Samarkand Samarkand Oblast; ✓ Irrigator Chardzhou; ✓ Tselinnik Yangiyer; ✗ Tashavtomash Tashkent; ✓ Alay Osh; ✓ Khimik Chirchik; ✓ Andizhan; ✓ Pakhtakor Kurgan-Tyube; ✓ Pakhtaaral Syrdarya Oblast; ✓ Akkurgan Tashkent Oblast; ✓ Metallurg Almalyk; ✓ Vakhsh Nurek; ✓ Fakel Bukhara; ✗ Abremchimchi Leninabad; ✗ Khimik Kalininskiy Raion; ✓ Kara-Kum Mary; ✗ Mekhnat Kokand; ✗ Kolkhoz Narimanova Narimanov; ✗ Bekabad; ✗ Chigarachi Termez

Source: []

Notes

- The underlined are marked teams that entered the competition in 1968 for the second time, but initially in 1967 they competed as part of the 1967 Soviet Class B qualification (preliminary) stage within the RSFSR Zone.
- Competitions within the Kazakhstan Zone with over 20 teams never took place. Teams from Moldavia in the Class B did not take part. Also, the RSFSR 7 Zone (Moscow) of the Class B did not take place.

== Competition schedule ==
=== Preliminary stage ===
==== Group 1 (Russian Federation) ====
===== Preliminary round =====
[Apr 23] 
SPARTAK Belgorod              1-0  Dinamo Bryansk 
TRUDOVIYE REZERVY Kursk       1-0  Iskra Smolensk

===== First round =====
[May 11] 
AVANGARD Kolomna              3-2  Zvezda Serpukhov 
Granitas Klaipeda             0-0  Neman Grodno 
KHIMIK Novomoskovsk           1-0  Trudoviye Rezervy Kursk 
SPARTAK Mogilyov              2-0  Spartak Brest 
SPARTAK Ryazan                2-0  Spartak Belgorod 
ZNAMYA Noginsk                1-0  Spartak Tambov 
Znamya Truda Orekhovo-Zuyevo  0-0  Spartak Oryol 
ZVEJNIEKS Liepaja             1-0  Dvina Vitebsk

====== First round replays ======
GRANITAS Klaipeda             3-0  Neman Grodno 
ZNAMYA TRUDA Orekhovo-Zuyevo  3-1  Spartak Oryol

===== Quarterfinals =====
[Jun 18] 
AVANGARD Kolomna              1-0  Znamya Noginsk 
SPARTAK Mogilyov              2-1  Spartak Ryazan              [aet] 
ZNAMYA TRUDA Orekhovo-Zuyevo  4-1  Khimik Novomoskovsk 
Zvejnieks Liepaja             0-1  GRANITAS Klaipeda

===== Semifinals =====
Granitas Klaipeda             0-1  SPARTAK Mogilyov 
Znamya Truda Orekhovo-Zuyevo  0-1  AVANGARD Kolomna

===== Final =====
SPARTAK Mogilyov              4-0  Avangard Kolomna

==== Group 2 (Russian Federation) ====
===== Preliminary round =====
KOVROVETS Kovrov              2-1  Sever Murmansk 
TORPEDO Lyubertsy             1-0  Traktor Vladimir 
VOLGA Ulyanovsk               1-0  Energiya Cheboksary

===== First round =====
DINAMO Vologda                1-0  Onezhets Petrozavodsk 
METALLURG Cherepovets         2-1  Bolshevik Leningrad 
METALLURG Lipetsk             2-1  Chaika Zelyonodolsk 
SATURN Rybinsk                2-0  Kovrovets Kovrov 
SPARTAK Saransk               3-1  Spartak Kostroma 
TORPEDO Lyubertsy             2-1  Mashinostroitel Balashikha 
Torpedo Pavlovo               1-1  Khimik Dzerzhinsk 
VOLGA Ulyanovsk               1-0  Torpedo Podolsk

====== First round replays ======
Torpedo Pavlovo               0-2  KHIMIK Dzerzhinsk

===== Quarterfinals =====
Dinamo Vologda                0-1  METALLURG Lipetsk 
SATURN Rybinsk                2-1  Metallurg Cherepovets 
TORPEDO Lyubertsy             1-0  Spartak Saransk 
VOLGA Ulyanovsk               1-0  Khimik Dzerzhinsk

===== Semifinals =====
METALLURG Lipetsk             2-0  Saturn Rybinsk 
VOLGA Ulyanovsk               1-0  Torpedo Lyubertsy

===== Final =====
METALLURG Lipetsk             3-1  Volga Ulyanovsk

==== Group 3 (Russian Federation) ====
===== Preliminary round =====
POLAD Sumgait                 2-1  Textilshchik Mingechaur 
UROZHAI Pavlovskaya           1-0  Urozhai Svetlograd 
VOLGAR Astrakhan              4-0  Khimik Balakovo

===== First round =====
ENERGIYA Novocherkassk        3-0  Kalitva Belaya Kalitva 
ENERGIYA Volzhskiy            1-0  Trud Engels 
PROGRESS Kamensk              3-0  Uralan Elista 
SHAKHTYOR Shakhty             3-2  Volgar Astrakhan 
TORPEDO Armavir               3-2  Polad Sumgait 
TORPEDO Taganrog              2-0  Urozhai Pavlovskaya 
TRUD Togliatti                2-1  Khimmashevets Penza 
TYAZHMASH Syzran              1-0  Metallurg Kuibyshev

===== Quarterfinals =====
ENERGIYA Novocherkassk        4-1  Torpedo Armavir 
SHAKHTYOR Shakhty             1-0  Progress Kamensk 
Trud Togliatti                3-4  ENERGIYA Volzhskiy 
TYAZHMASH Syzran              2-1  Torpedo Taganrog

===== Semifinals =====
Energiya Novocherkassk        2-2  Shakhtyor Shakhty 
Energiya Volzhskiy            1-2  TYAZHMASH Syzran

====== Semifinals replays ======
ENERGIYA Novocherkassk        3-2  Shakhtyor Shakhty

===== Final =====
ENERGIYA Novocherkassk        2-1  TyazhMash Syzran

==== Group 4 (Russian Federation) ====
===== Preliminary round =====
DINAMO Sukhumi                3-2  Shukura Kobuleti 
Guria Lanchkhuti              0-0  Kolkhida Poti 
LERNAGORTS Kafan              2-1  Sevan Oktemberyan 
LORI Kirovakan                1-0  Araks Yerevan

====== Preliminary round replays ======
GURIA Lanchkhuti              3-2  Kolkhida Poti

===== First round =====
CEMENT Novorossiysk           3-1  Dinamo Makhachkala 
Dinamo Sukhumi                2-4  GURIA Lanchkhuti 
INGURI Zugdidi                1-0  Magaroeli Chiatura 
Lernagorts Kafan              3-3  Alazani Gurjaani 
LORI Kirovakan                3-2  Dila Gori 
METALLURG Rustavi             2-0  Mashinostroitel Pyatigorsk 
SPARTAK Kislovodsk            2-0  Urozhai Maykop 
UROZHAI Krymsk                4-0  Urozhai Derbent

====== First round replays ======
LERNAGORTS Kafan              4-3  Alazani Gurjaani

===== Quarterfinals =====
Lernagorts Kafan              3-3  Inguri Zugdidi 
METALLURG Rustavi             1-0  Guria Lanchkhuti 
SPARTAK Kislovodsk            w/o  Lori Kirovakan 
UROZHAI Krymsk                2-1  Cement Novorossiysk

====== Quarterfinals replays ======
LERNAGORTS Kafan              1-0  Inguri Zugdidi

===== Semifinals =====
Metallurg Rustavi             0-2  UROZHAI Krymsk 
SPARTAK Kislovodsk            2-0  Lernagorts Kafan

===== Final =====
Urozhai Krymsk                0-1  SPARTAK Kislovodsk

==== Group 5 (Russian Federation) ====
===== Preliminary round =====
KALININETS Sverdlovsk         3-0  Metallurg Zlatoust 
LOKOMOTIV Orenburg            4-1  Torpedo Miass 
METALLURG Magnitogorsk        2-1  Neftyanik Bugulma

===== First round =====
AVTOMOBILIST Kustanay         2-1  Khimik Salavat 
DINAMO Kirov                  4-1  Neftyanik Tyumen 
KAUCHUK Sterlitamak           w/o  Aktyubinets Aktyubinsk 
KHIMIK Berezniki              2-0  Kalininets Sverdlovsk 
METALLURG Magnitogorsk        1-0  Zauralets Kurgan 
SPARTAK Yoshkar-Ola           4-0  Neftyanik Oktyabrskiy 
URALETS Nizhniy Tagil         1-0  Lokomotiv Orenburg 
ZENIT Izhevsk                 2-1  Burovik Almetyevsk

===== Quarterfinals =====
Avtomobilist Kustanay         0-2  METALLURG Magnitogorsk 
DINAMO Kirov                  3-2  Spartak Yoshkar-Ola         [aet] 
Uralets Nizhniy Tagil         1-2  KAUCHUK Sterlitamak 
ZENIT Izhevsk                 2-0  Khimik Berezniki

===== Semifinals =====
Dinamo Kirov                  0-1  ZENIT Izhevsk 
KAUCHUK Sterlitamak           1-0  Metallurg Magnitogorsk

===== Final =====
ZENIT Izhevsk                 5-0  Kauchuk Sterlitamak

==== Group 6 (Russian Federation) ====
===== Preliminary round =====
CEMENTNIK Semipalatinsk       2-1  Shakhtyor Kiselyovsk        [aet] 
PROGRESS Biysk                2-0  Shakhtyor Prokopyevsk

===== First round =====
AVANGARD Komsomolsk-na-Amure  2-1  Rybak Nakhodka 
Lokomotiv Krasnoyarsk         2-2  Progress Biysk 
METALLURG Novokuznetsk        2-0  Irtysh Pavlodar 
OKEAN Vladivostok             1-0  Amur Blagoveshchensk 
SELENGA Ulan-Ude              1-0  Pursei Bratsk 
SKA Chita                     3-2  Angara Irkutsk              [aet] 
START Angarsk                 2-0  Neftyanik Omsk 
Torpedo Rubtsovsk             0-1  CEMENTNIK Semipalatinsk

====== First round replays ======
LOKOMOTIV Krasnoyarsk         2-0  Progress Biysk

===== Quarterfinals =====
CEMENTNIK Semipalatinsk       1-0  Metallurg Novokuznetsk      [aet] 
LOKOMOTIV Krasnoyarsk         2-1  Start Angarsk 
OKEAN Vladivostok             1-0  Avangard Komsomolsk-na-Amure 
SELENGA Ulan-Ude              3-0  SKA Chita

===== Semifinals =====
CEMENTNIK Semipalatinsk       2-0  Lokomotiv Krasnoyarsk 
OKEAN Vladivostok             2-1  Selenga Ulan-Ude

===== Final =====
CEMENTNIK Semipalatinsk       5-2  Okean Vladivostok

==== Group Zakarpattia (Ukraine) ====
===== First round =====
AVANGARD Makeyevka            0-0  Shakhter Krasnograd        [pen] 
AVANGARD Ternopol             3-0  Verkhovina Uzhgorod 
BUKOVINA Chernovtsy           2-1  Shakhter Novovolynsk 
DINAMO Khmelnitskiy           2-1  Neftyanik Drogobych 
ENERGIA Novaya Kakhovka       1-0  Goryn Rovno 
KARPATY Mukachevo             1-0  Start Dzerzhinsk 
SHAKHTER Kadiyevka            2-0  Dnepr Cherkassy 
SPARTAK Ivano-Frankovsk       6-4  Torpedo Lutsk

===== Quarterfinals =====
DINAMO Khmelnitskiy           2-0  Spartak Ivano-Frankovsk 
ENERGIYA Novaya Kakhovka      1-0  Avangard Makeyevka 
KARPATY Mukachevo             2-1  Bukovina Chernovtsy 
SHAKHTYOR Kadiyevka           0-0  Avangard Ternopol           [pen]

===== Semifinals =====
DINAMO Khmelnitskiy           2-0  Shakhtyor Kadiyevka 
KARPATY Mukachevo             0-0  Energiya Novaya Kakhovka    [pen]

===== Final =====
Karpaty Mukachevo             0-1  DINAMO Khmelnitskiy

==== Group Crimea (Ukraine) ====
===== First round =====
AVANGARD Kerch                1-0  Torpedo Berdyansk 
KOLOS Akimovka                2-1  Progress Berdichev 
PROMETHEUS Dneprodzerzhinsk   1-0  Lokomotiv Donetsk 
SITALL Konstantinovka         2-0  Trubnik Nikopol 
TORPEDO Kharkov               1-0  Shakhtyor Sverdlovsk

===== Quarterfinals =====
Avangard Kerch                1-2  PROMETHEUS Dneprodzerzhinsk 
DESNA Chernigov               0-0  Avangard Rovenki            [pen 9-8] 
KOLOS Akimovka                2-1  Sitall Konstantinovka 
SPARTAK Sumy                  1-0  Torpedo Kharkov

===== Semifinals =====
DESNA Chernigov               3-1  Prometheus Dneprodzerzhinsk 
SPARTAK Sumy                  2-1  Kolos Akimovka

===== Final =====
SPARTAK Sumy                  1-0  Desna Chernigov

==== Group Asia ====
===== Subgroup 1 =====
1.Sverdlovets Tashkent Region    2   1  0  1  2-2   2   
-----------------------------------------------------
2.Tselinnik Yangiyer             2   1  0  1  3-3   2   
3.Metallurg Almalyk              2   1  0  1  3-3   2

Cross-Table:
                   1   2   3        
1.Sverdlovets      xxx 2-0 0-2  
2.Tselinnik        0-2 xxx 3-1  
3.Metallurg        2-0 1-3 xxx

===== Subgroup 2 =====
1.Irrigator Charjou              3   2  1  0  6-2   5   
-----------------------------------------------------
2.Samarkand                      3   1  1  1  4-4   3   
3.Fakel Buhara                   3   0  2  1  2-3   2  
4.Kara-Kum Mary                  3   0  2  1  3-6   2

Cross-Table:
                   1   2   3   4       
1.Irrigator        xxx 2-1 0-0 4-1   
2.Samarkand        1-2 xxx 2-1 1-1  
3.Fakel            0-0 1-2 xxx 1-1  
4.Kara-Kum         1-4 1-1 1-1 xxx

===== Subgroup 3 =====
1.Andizhan                       2   1  1  0  3-1   3   
-----------------------------------------------------
2.Pahtaaral Gulustan             2   0  2  0  2-2   2   
3.Akkurgan Tashkent Region       2   0  1  1  1-3   1

Cross-Table:
                   1   2   3        
1.Andizhan         xxx 1-1 2-0  
2.Pahtaaral        1-1 xxx 1-1  
3.Akkurgan         0-2 1-1 xxx

===== Subgroup 4 =====
1.Ok Oltyn Andizhan Region       2   1  1  0  4-1   3   
-----------------------------------------------------
2.Alay Osh                       2   0  2  0  2-2   2   
3.Pakhtakor Kurgan-Tyube          2   0  1  1  3-6   1

Cross-Table:
                   1   2   3        
1.Ok Oltyn         xxx 0-0 4-1  
2.Alay             0-0 xxx 2-2  
3.Pakhtakor         1-4 2-2 xxx

===== Semifinals =====
Andizhan                      1-4  SVERDLOVETS Tashkent Region 
IRRIGATOR Charjou             2-0  Ok Oltyn Andizhan Region

===== Final =====
SVERDLOVETS Tashkent Region   2-1  Irrigator Charjou           [aet]

=== Final stage ===
==== First round ====
[Apr 2] 
TEXTILSHCHIK Ivanovo          1-0  Energiya Novocherkassk 
  [Y.Pyanov 8] 
[Apr 3] 
KARPATY Lvov                  1-0  Spartak Mogilyov 
LUCH Vladivostok              2-1  SKA Khabarovsk 
  [V.Akimov, A.Kandalintsev – V.Ivkin] 
Metallurg Chimkent            2-2  SKA Chita 
METALLURG Zaporozhye          3-0  Dnepr Dnepropetrovsk 
  [V.Chaplygin-2, B.Baluyev] 
TEMP Barnaul                  1-0  Vostok Ust-Kamenogorsk 
  [B.Dolgov] 
[Apr 4] 
AVTOMOBILIST Zhitomir         2-0  Daugava Riga 
Baltika Kaliningrad           0-0  SKA Odessa 
CEMENTNIK Semipalatinsk       3-2  Sverdlovets Tashkent Region [aet] 
DINAMO Khmelnitskiy           1-0  Metallurg Tula 
DINAMO Stavropol              2-1  Lokomotiv Kherson 
  [Zhuravlyov, Solovyov – Drovetskiy] 
DNEPR Kremenchug              2-1  Spartak Nalchik             [aet] 
Energetik Dushanbe            0-1  SHAKHTYOR Karaganda 
IRTYSH Omsk                   1-0  Aeroflot Irkutsk 
KHIMIK Severodonetsk          5-1  Volga Kalinin 
Krivbass Krivoi Rog           2-3  SKA Kiev 
  [Y.Sprikut, V.Gladkikh - ?] 
KUBAN Krasnodar               3-0  Zvezda Kirovograd 
KUZBASS Kemerovo              2-1  SKA Novosibirsk             [aet] 
  [N.Golikov, N.Chernomyrdin – B.Smirnov] 
LOKOMOTIV Kaluga              1-0  Dinamo Tallinn 
LOKOMOTIV Tbilisi             1-0  Volga Ulyanovsk 
Lokomotiv Vinnitsa            2-2  Dinamo Leningrad 
METALLURG Lipetsk             2-1  Tavria Simferopol           [aet] 
MOLDOVA Kishinev              2-0  Neman Grodno 
  [I.Nadein 80, A.Teslev 88] 
NARZAN Kislovodsk             2-0  Meshakhte Tkibuli 
PAMIR Leninabad               1-0  Rassvet Krasnoyarsk 
POLITOTDEL Tashkent Region    2-0  Zarafshan Navoi 
ROSTSELMASH Rostov-na-Donu    1-0  Metallurg Kuibyshev 
  [Yermakov] 
SHIRAK Leninakan              6-1  Polad Sumgait 
SKA Lvov                      1-0  Spartak Gomel               [aet] 
  [V.Pinkovskiy 102] 
SKCF Sevastopol               1-0  Avangard Zholtyye Vody      [aet] 
Sokol Saratov                 1-1  Shinnik Yaroslavl 
  [Shpitalny – G.Shilin] 
SPARTAK Orjonikidze           4-0  Lokomotiv Chelyabinsk 
  [Y.Abayev-2, Y.Savidi, N.Papelishvili] 
STROITEL Ufa                  1-0  Zenit Izhevsk 
  [V.Starkov] 
SUDOSTROITEL Nikolayev        2-1  Trud Voronezh 
  [Petrov 12, Bildyuk 64 – Proskurin 7] 
TEREK Grozny                  2-1  Spartak Yoshkar-Ola 
TOMLES Tomsk                  w/o  Alga Frunze 
TRAKTOR Volgograd             1-0  Zvezda Perm                 [aet] 
URALMASH Sverdlovsk           1-0  Rubin Kazan 
Volga Gorkiy                  1-1  Volgar Astrakhan

===== First round replays =====
[Apr 4] 
Metallurg Chimkent            1-2  SKA Chita 
  [? – O.Semyonov, V.Yeryomin] 
[Apr 5] 
BALTIKA Kaliningrad           1-0  SKA Odessa 
  [V.Knyazev 3] 
Lokomotiv Vinnitsa            1-2  DINAMO Leningrad            [aet] 
SOKOL Saratov                 1-0  Shinnik Yaroslavl 
  [Zarubin] 
VOLGA Gorkiy                  3-0  Volgar Astrakhan

==== Second round ====
[Apr 7] 
Cementnik Semipalatinsk       0-1  STROITEL Ashkhabad          [aet] 
KUZBASS Kemerovo              1-0  SKA Chita 
  [V.Ryashin] 
NEFTYANIK Fergana             1-0  Temp Barnaul                [aet] 
PAMIR Leninabad               1-0  Irtysh Omsk 
[Apr 8] 
POLITOTDEL Tashkent Region    1-0  Luch Vladivostok 
Shakhtyor Karaganda           1-2  TOMLES Tomsk 
  [? – V.Mavrov (S) og, A.Makushin] 
[Apr 19] 
Avtomobilist Zhitomir         0-0  SelStroi Poltava 
DINAMO Batumi                 2-1  Volga Gorkiy                [aet] 
DINAMO Leningrad              6-2  Dinamo Khmelnitskiy 
Karpaty Lvov                  0-1  SKA Kiev                    [aet] 
KHIMIK Severodonetsk          1-0  Baltika Kaliningrad 
Lokomotiv Kaluga              1-2  MOLDOVA Kishinev 
METALLIST Kharkov             2-0  Metallurg Zaporozhye 
  [A.Kafaji, Y.Nemirovskiy] 
METALLURG Lipetsk             2-1  Dnepr Kremenchug 
Metallurg Magnitogorsk        0-0  Shirak Leninakan 
Narzan Kislovodsk             2-2  Dinamo Makhachkala 
SKCF Sevastopol               0-0  Kuban Krasnodar 
SOKOL Saratov                 3-0  RostSelMash Rostov-na-Donu 
  [Chernyshkov-2, Filipenko] 
Spartak Sumy                  1-1  Dinamo Stavropol 
STROITEL Ufa                  1-0  Terek Grozny 
  [N.Filatov] 
SUDOSTROITEL Nikolayev        1-0  Textilshchik Ivanovo 
  [I.Petrov 90] 
TRAKTOR Volgograd             2-0  Lokomotiv Tbilisi 
URALMASH Sverdlovsk           3-0  Spartak Orjonikidze 
ŽALGIRIS Vilnius              2-0  SKA Lvov

===== Second round replays =====
AVTOMOBILIST Zhitomir         1-0  SelStroi Poltava            [aet] 
  [Matveyev] 
METALLURG Magnitogorsk        1-0  Shirak Leninakan 
NARZAN Kislovodsk             1-0  Dinamo Makhachkala          [aet] 
SKCF Sevastopol               1-2  KUBAN Krasnodar             [aet] 
SPARTAK Sumy                  2-1  Dinamo Stavropol            [aet] 
  [? – Moiseyev]

==== Third round ====
[Apr 21] 
KUZBASS Kemerovo              4-2  TomLes Tomsk                [aet] 
  [V.Poluyanov-2, A.Zavyalkin, V.Cheremnov – I.Ishchenko-2] 
NEFTYANIK Fergana             1-0  Politotdel Tashkent Region 
STROITEL Ashkhabad            2-1  Pamir Leninabad 
[May 20] 
Avtomobilist Zhitomir         2-3  DINAMO Leningrad 
Metallist Kharkov             0-1  KUBAN Krasnodar             [aet] 
Metallurg Magnitogorsk        1-2  URALMASH Sverdlovsk 
MOLDOVA Kishinev              2-1  Khimik Severodonetsk        [aet] 
SKA Kiev                      3-1  Žalgiris Vilnius 
SPARTAK Sumy                  2-0  Metallurg Lipetsk 
STROITEL Ufa                  w/o  Narzan Kislovodsk 
Sudostroitel Nikolayev        1-2  SOKOL Saratov 
  [I.Petrov 88 – Zarubin 40, Demidov 90] 
Traktor Volgograd             0-1  DINAMO Batumi

==== Fourth round ====
[Jun 16] 
SOKOL Saratov                 2-1  Ararat Yerevan 
  [Filipenko-2 – Sergei Melkumov] 
[Jun 27] 
Dinamo Batumi                 0-2  PAHTAKOR Tashkent 
  [Gennadiy Krasnitskiy-2] 
KUZBASS Kemerovo              3-0  Zenit Leningrad 
  [N.Golikov 38, A.Lavrushchenko 60, V.Cheremnov 75] 
Moldova Kishinev              1-2  DINAMO Minsk                [aet] 
  [A.Teslev ? – Anatoliy Vasilyev 107, Mikhail Mustygin 108] 
SKA Kiev                      1-0  Dinamo Kirovabad 
  [Bogodelov 78] 
Stroitel Ufa                  1-3  NEFTCHI Baku 
  [B.Sokolovskiy – Valeriy Gajiyev, Anatoliy Banishevskiy, Eduard Markarov] 
URALMASH Sverdlovsk           3-0  Chernomorets Odessa 
  [G.Yepishin 27, V.Borodin 39, A.Zhos 43] 
[Jun 28] 
CSKA Moskva                   4-1  Lokomotiv Moskva 
  [Vladimir Fedotov 33, Vladimir Dudarenko 52, 75, Vladimir Polikarpov 60 – Boris Kokh 62] 
DINAMO Kiev                   3-0  Spartak Moskva 
  [Vitaliy Khmelnitskiy 22, Yozhef Sabo 62, 86] 
Dinamo Leningrad              1-4  SHAKHTYOR Donetsk 
  [O.Sakharov – Stanislav Yevseyenko-2, Valeriy Lobanovskiy, Anatoliy Ogirchuk] 
DINAMO Tbilisi                3-0  SKA Rostov-na-Donu 
  [Georgiy Gavasheli 15, Slava Metreveli ?, Kakhi Asatiani 80] 
Kuban Krasnodar               0-3  DINAMO Moskva 
  [Vadim Ivanov 40, Yuriy Avrutskiy 60, Vladimir Kozlov 87] 
Neftyanik Fergana             0-2  TORPEDO Moskva 
  [David Pais, Eduard Streltsov] 
Spartak Sumy                  1-3  KAYRAT Alma-Ata 
  [Kislyakov – Oleg Dolmatov, Valentin Dyshlenko, Kislenko] 
STROITEL Ashkhabad            3-0  Krylya Sovetov Kuibyshev 
  [Karnakhin-2, V.Kazakov] 
ZARYA Lugansk                 3-1  Torpedo Kutaisi 
  [Vladislav Prodanets 47, 79, Nikolai Pinchuk 61 – Otari Gadelia 84]

==== Fifth round ====
[Jul 23] 
Dinamo Minsk                  0-2  ZARYA Lugansk 
  [Nikolai Litvinov 29, Yuriy Meleshko 72] 
KAYRAT Alma-Ata               2-1  Dinamo Moskva 
  [Viktor Abgolts 26, Oleg Volokh 88 – Vladimir Larin 82] 
NEFTCHI Baku                  3-0  Stroitel Ashkhabad 
  [Eduard Markarov 26, 61, Yuriy Stekolnikov 31] 
PAHTAKOR Tashkent             1-0  Sokol Saratov 
  [G.Zhilenko 73] 
SHAKHTYOR Donetsk             1-0  Dinamo Kiev 
  [Valeriy Yaremchenko 4] 
SKA Kiev                      5-2  Kuzbass Kemerovo 
  [M.Stuller 33, 60, B.Verigin 37, P.Bogodelov 67, V.Pestrikov 75 – V.Poluyanov 26, 43] 
Torpedo Moskva                2-2  CSKA Moskva 
  [Eduard Streltsov 37, Alexandr Lenyov 58 – Pavel Adamov 62, Vladimir Polikarpov 83] 
URALMASH Sverdlovsk           1-0  Dinamo Tbilisi 
  [G.Yepishin 56]

===== Fifth round replay =====
[Jul 24] 
TORPEDO Moskva                2-1  CSKA Moskva 
  [Gennadiy Shalimov 5, Eduard Streltsov 58 – Vladimir Fedotov 11]

==== Quarterfinals ====
[Aug 6] 
Kayrat Alma-Ata         2-3  NEFTCHI Baku 
  [Sergei Kvochkin, Viktor Abgolts – Anatoliy Banishevskiy-2, Valentin Dyshlenko (K) og] 
SHAKHTYOR Donetsk       1-0  SKA Kiev 
  [Viktor Tlyarugov 80] 
TORPEDO Moskva          3-1  UralMash Sverdlovsk 
  [Mikhail Gershkovich 22, Vladimir Mikhailov 28, Grigoriy Yanets 30 – V.Borodin ?] 
Zarya Lugansk           1-2  PAHTAKOR Tashkent 
  [Nikolai Pinchuk 88 – Berador Abduraimov 60, Tulyagan Isakov 73]

==== Semifinals ====
[Aug 26] 
Neftchi Baku            0-2  TORPEDO Moskva 
  [Alexandr Lenyov 21, Adil Babayev (N) 61 og] 
PAHTAKOR Tashkent       3-1  Shakhtyor Donetsk 
  [Berador Abduraimov 1, 34, Bohadyr Ibragimov 53 – Yuriy Gubich 88]

==== Final ====
8 November 1968

Torpedo Moscow	1 – 0	Pakhtakor Tashkent
Savchenko 52'	Report

Lenin's Central Stadium, Moscow
Attendance: 52,000
Referee: Tofiq Bahramov (Baku)
