= 1987 Soviet Second League, Zone 6 =

Football Championship of Ukrainian SSR
- Season: 1987
- Champions: Tavriya Simferopol
- Promoted: Tavriya Simferopol (after playoffs)
- Relegated: SKA Kiev
- Top goalscorer: 30 - Viktor Oliynyk (Bukovyna Chernivtsi) and Volodymyr Shyshkov (Spartak Zhytomyr)

1987 Football Championship of Ukrainian SSR was the 57th season of association football competition of the Ukrainian SSR, which was part of the Soviet Second League.

The 1987 Football Championship of Ukrainian SSR was won for the second time by SC Tavriya Simferopol. Qualified for the interzonal playoffs, the team from Crimean Oblast managed to gain promotion by winning its group.

== Teams ==
=== Map ===
Locations of teams in Lower Second League, Zone 1

=== Promoted teams ===
- Vorskla Poltava – Champion of the Fitness clubs competitions (KFK) (debut)

=== Relegated teams ===
- None

=== Renamed teams ===
- Prior to the start of the season Atlantyka Sevastopol was renamed to Chaika Sevastopol.

== League standings ==
Pos	Team	Pld	W	D	L	GF	GA	GD	Pts	Qualification or relegation
1	Tavriya Simferopol (C)	52	34	12	6	125	48	+77	80	Qualified for promotional playoffs
2	Nyva Ternopil	52	28	16	8	85	38	+47	72	
3	Prykarpattia Ivano-Frankivsk	52	29	10	13	69	41	+28	68	
4	Bukovyna Chernivtsi	52	27	13	12	81	46	+35	67	
5	SKA Odesa	52	25	14	13	64	45	+19	64	
6	Naftovyk Okhtyrka	52	24	15	13	72	48	+24	63	
7	Podillya Khmelnytskyi	52	23	17	12	67	49	+18	63	
8	Okean Kerch	52	26	9	17	68	50	+18	61	
9	Vorskla Poltava	52	22	14	16	74	59	+15	58	
10	Shakhtar Horlivka	52	22	13	17	67	58	+9	57	
11	Kryvbas Kryvyi Rih	52	23	10	19	68	68	0	56	
12	Spartak Zhytomyr	52	22	12	18	72	59	+13	56	
13	Nyva Vinnytsia	52	20	13	19	54	47	+7	53	
14	Avanhard Rivne	52	19	14	19	50	53	−3	52	
15	Chayka Sevastopol	52	20	9	23	57	63	−6	49	
16	Torpedo Lutsk	52	18	10	24	55	63	−8	46	
17	Sudobudivnyk Mykolaiv	52	17	10	25	52	65	−13	44	
18	Krystal Kherson	52	16	10	26	54	79	−25	42	
19	Zakarpattia Uzhhorod	52	16	10	26	59	73	−14	42	
20	Torpedo Zaporizhzhia	52	12	16	24	54	81	−27	40	
21	Shakhtar Pavlohrad	52	11	18	23	40	59	−19	40	
22	Mayak Kharkiv	52	15	9	28	47	83	−36	39	
23	Zirka Kirovohrad	52	13	13	26	44	77	−33	39	
24	Desna Chernihiv	52	11	17	24	48	80	−32	39	
25	Dynamo Irpin	52	10	19	23	37	55	−18	39	
26	Novator Zhdanov	52	16	6	30	57	107	−50	38	
27	SKA Kyiv	52	11	15	26	41	6	+35	37	Relegation to the Fitness clubs competitions (KFK)

(C) Champions

=== Top goalscorers ===
The following were the top ten goalscorers.

#	Scorer	Goals (Pen.)	Team
1	Viktor Oliynyk	30	Bukovyna Chernivtsi
1	Volodymyr Shyshkov	30	Spartak Zhytomyr
3	Ihor Yavorsky	23	Nyva Ternopil
3	Serhiy Turyanskyi	23	Prykarpattia Ivano-Frankivsk
5	Ivan Shariy	22	Vorskla Poltava

== See also ==
- Soviet Second League
