= Rasim Kerimow =

Turkmenistan footballer

Personal information
- Date of birth: 13 July 1979 (age 47)
- Place of birth: Tejen, Turkmenistan SSR
- Height: 1.88 m (6 ft 2 in)
- Position: Defender

Senior career*
Years	Team	Apps	(Gls)
1996–2000	Nisa Aşgabat		
2001	Lokomotiv Chita	11	(0)
2002	Galkan Aşgabat		
2002–2003	Nisa Aşgabat		
2003–2005	Vorskla Poltava	16	(2)
2004	→ Vorskla-2 Poltava	1	(0)
2005–2010	Ahal		

International career
2004	Turkmenistan	3	(0)
- * Club domestic league appearances and goals

Rasim Kerimow is a Turkmenistan football defender who played for Turkmenistan in the 2004 Asian Cup. He also played for FC Chita, Nisa Asgabat, Vorskla Poltava, Ahal Annau.
