= Andriy Khomyn =

Andriy Khomyn may refer to:

- Andriy Khomyn (footballer born 1982), Ukrainian footballer
- Andriy Khomyn (footballer born 1968), Ukrainian footballer
