= Sergey Kostyuk =

Kazakhstani football midfielder (born 1978)

Personal information
- Full name: Sergey Anatolyvich Kostyuk
- Date of birth: 30 November 1978 (age 47)
- Place of birth: Odesa, Ukrainian SSR; Soviet Union
- Height: 1.77 m (5 ft 10 in)
- Position: Midfielder

Senior career*
Years	Team	Apps	(Gls)
1996–1997	SK Odesa	1	(0)
1997–1998	SKA-Lotto Odesa	27	(2)
1998	SK Odesa	13	(2)
1999–2000	Chornomorets Odesa	31	(1)
1999–2000	→ Chornomorets-2 Odesa	30	(0)
2001	Vorskla Poltava	1	(0)
2001	→ Vorskla-2 Poltava	28	(9)
2002	Polissya Zhytomyr	7	(0)
2002	Dnister Ovidiopol	1	(0)
2003–2006	Atyrau	108	(20)
2007	Shakhter Karagandy	24	(2)
2008	Vostok	10	(2)
2009	Shakhter Karagandy	25	(11)
2010	Zhetysu	23	(2)
2011–2012	Tobol	48	(5)
2013	Vostok	30	(5)
2017–2019	Real Pharma Odesa	63	(3)

International career
2004	Kazakhstan	1	(0)
- * Club domestic league appearances and goals

Sergey Kostyuk (Ukrainian: Сергій Костюк; born 30 November 1978) is a Kazakhstani retired footballer who played as a midfielder.

== Club statistics ==
Last update: 28 October 2012

Club	Season	League		Cup		Europe		Total	
Club	Season	Apps	Goals	Apps	Goals	Apps	Goals	Apps	Goals
SK Odesa	1996–97	1	0	?	?	-	-	1	0
SK Odesa	1997–98	27	2	?	?	-	-	27	2
SK Odesa	1998–99	13	2	?	?	-	-	13	2
Chornomorets Odesa	1998–99	18	1	?	?	-	-	18	1
Chornomorets Odesa	1999–00	10	0	?	?	-	-	10	0
Chornomorets Odesa	2000–01	3	0	?	?	-	-	3	0
Vorskla	2001–02	1	0	?	?	-	-	1	0
Polissya	2001–02	7	0	?	?	-	-	7	0
Dnister Ovidiopol	2002–03	1	0	?	?	-	-	1	0
Ukraine total		81	5	?	?	-	-	81	5
Atyrau	2003	30	6	?	0	2	0	32	6
Atyrau	2004	32	6	4	1	-	-	36	7
Atyrau	2005	25	7	6	0	-	-	31	7
Atyrau	2006	21	1	1	0	-	-	22	1
Shakhter Karagandy	2007	24	2	3	0	-	-	27	2
Vostok	2008	10	2	2	0	-	-	12	2
Shakhter Karagandy	2009	25	11	7	1	-	-	32	12
Zhetysu	2010	23	2	3	1	-	-	26	3
Tobol	2011	28	2	5	0	1	0	34	2
Tobol	2012	20	3	4	0	-	-	24	3
Kazakhstan total		228	40	35	3	3	0	266	43
Career Total		309	45	35	3	3	0	347	48
