= FC Vorskla Poltava =

Professional association football club based in Poltava, Ukraine

Vorskla Poltava
- Full name: Футбольний клуб «Во́рскла» Полта́ва; Football Club Vorskla Poltava
- Nickname: Zeleno-Bili (Green-Whites)
- Founded: 1955; 71 years ago
- Ground: Butovsky Vorskla Stadium
- Capacity: 24,795
- Owner: Eduard Shalayev via Ferrexpo
- Administrators: Roman Cherniak (president); Oleh Lysak (vice-president); Hennadiy Muzyka (vice-president)
- Manager: Valeriy Kutsenko (caretaker)
- League: Ukrainian First League
- 2025–26: Ukrainian First League, 14th of 16 (denied license)
- Website: vorskla.com.ua
Home colours	Away colours

FC Vorskla Poltava (Ukrainian: ФК «Во́рскла» Полта́ва [ˈwɔrsklɐ polˈtɑwɐ]) is a Ukrainian professional football club based in Poltava. The team competes in the Ukrainian First League, the second tier of Ukrainian football after relegation from the Ukrainian Premier League in 2024–25.

== History ==
=== Kolos Poltava ===
The club draws its history from 1955, when on the initiative of the first secretary of the regional party cell Mikhail Stakhursky in the city of Poltava was established a football club Kolhospnyk within the republican trade union sports society Kolhospnyk. The same year it entered the Football Championship of the Ukrainian SSR, where it was already played by one of the older clubs from Poltava, Lokomotyv Poltava. Besides Kolhospnyk and Lokomotyv, at the republican level, Poltava was represented by some other sports societies before the 1950s.

Rumors about the appearance of the new club in Poltava, based at the VSS "Kolhospnyk", started to circulate in the fall of 1954. Besides Mikhail Stakhursky, one of the others who initiated the creation of the club was a chairman of the regional committee of physical culture and sport Oleksandr Kobushko who until 1953 played for various Poltava teams including Dynamo and Spartak. On 21 December 1954 the Central Committee of the Communist Party of Ukraine and the Council of Ministers of the Ukrainian SSR published a resolution, according to which, in each region there must be created regional councils of the VSS "Kolhospnyk". Thus, the Kolhospnyk football team was created in the regional center. According to the decision of the party bodies, the future team was supposed to already have famous football players in its ranks. For this purpose, Kobushko traveled almost the entire USSR in search of players. In late autumn 1954, the newly formed team began training. The selection policy of the Kolhospnyk management was aimed at inviting football players from Moscow and Transcarpathia. The first coach was Konstantin Skrypchenko, well known to Poltava residents. It was with his name that the successes of Poltava Lokomotyv, which he then headed, were associated. The "nachalnik" of the team became Oleksandr Kobushko. When naming all those who contributed to the creation of the team, one cannot help but recall Petro Beznosenko, by that time deputy chairman of the Ukrainian Council of the Kolhospnyk VSS. Thanks to him, at the beginning of 1955, Anatoliy Zubrytsky came to Poltava, who, together with Skrypchenko, continued to “sculpt” the arriving players into the team. It’s not for nothing that Beznosenko is called the “godfather” of “Kolhospnyk”.

In the early days of 1955, the regional council of the Kolhospnyk VSS was finally officially formed. On January 5, by order No. 4, the executive committee of the Poltava Regional Council of Workers' Deputies formed the regional council of the voluntary rural sports society "Kolhospnyk". This document was signed by Deputy Chairman of the Executive Committee Snihurenko. This order, in essence, is the birthday of “Kolhospnyk”.

In March, the Committee on Physical Culture and Sports included “Kolhospnyk” among the participants in the Football Championship of the Ukrainian SSR. Poltavians ended up in Group 1, where, along with them, participated such famous teams as Mashynobudivnyk Kyiv - one of the most titled teams in the republic (Ukrainian SSR) - champion and winner of the Ukrainian Cup in 1951. The 1955 season in the amateur league began quite late, on May 2. Therefore, the Poltava team had to play friendly matches throughout the spring and take part in one-day blitz tournaments. And so, on May 2, 1955, the first official match was played. On this day, at the Poltava stadium "Urozhai" (today - Vorskla), "Kolhospnyk" hosted the team Shakhtar Odesa. And as they say, "the first pancake turned out to be lumpy". Either a great desire to play as best as possible got in the way, or it was a lack of experience, but be that as it may, the Poltava team lost the first game with a score of 0:2, conceding a goal in each half. However, the audience who gathered on this festive evening liked the new team.

On May 25, Kolhospnyk won its first trophy - the Poltava City Cup, beating its main competitors - Lokomotyv in the final with a score of 2:1, and the victory came only in extra time. At the beginning of June, "Kolhospnyk", as the winner of the Poltava City Cup, took part in the Ukrainian Cup. Having overcome two rounds, the Poltava team stumbled in the quarterfinals. They lost to the Torpedo team from Sumy - 0:2. The Poltava team also completed the first half of the championship quite well, beating the group stage leader Mashynobudivnyk Kyiv at home in the last match - 3:1 (by the way, the Kyiv team lost only once in the group stage, and that was to the Poltava team). Continuing to collect victories, the Poltava team became the best team of the Kolhospnyk society. At the final competition, which, by the way, took place in Poltava in July, the hosts did not lose a single match, having drawn one game. Thus, this victory, automatically, despite the performances in the zonal championship of Ukraine, brought “Kolhospnyk” to the finals. The final of the Football Championship of the Ukrainian SSR took place in Kyiv from October 16 to 29. All the strongest teams got there. For Kolhospnyk fans, the final tournament brought only disappointment. Having received only two draws with Mashynobudivnyk Kyiv and Torpedo Kirovohrad, the team eventually took the last 8th place.

Already in 1957, the club obtained its professional status (team of masters) and was included in the competitions of the Soviet third division (then "Class B"). However, in 1982, the club went into bankruptcy and was dissolved. In 1983, many players moved to play for an amateur football team Kooperator from Poltava that represented the Poltava Institute of Cooperation. During its history for a short period of time from 1968 to 1972, Kolos was also carrying names Silbud and Budivelnyk.

=== Vorskla Poltava ===
In 1984, the club was reanimated based on the Kolos academy (sports school) as Vorskla after the river Vorskla, which flows through Poltava. In 1986, Vorskla entered the Soviet professional ranks of the third division, where it participated until the collapse of the Soviet system.

Upon the establishment of the Ukrainian football competitions in 1992, the club was admitted to the Ukrainian First League (the second tier of Ukrainian football), which it won in 1996. At that time, Vorskla was sponsored by "Poltavagasprom". The team debuted in the Ukrainian Premier League in the 1996–97 season, finishing that season in 3rd place. Vorskla have remained in the Premier League since, and participated twice in the UEFA Cup.

In 2003–2005, the club was named Vorskla-Naftogaz due to sponsorship reasons.

Soon after, Vorskla lost its financial support from Naftogaz, and the club found a new sponsor locally, Ferrexpo.

In 2009, Vorskla met Shakhtar Donetsk in the 2009 Ukrainian Cup Final. Mykola Pavlov's men won the match 1–0 after Vasyl Sachko's goal in the 49th minute. As a Domestic Cup winner, Vorskla participated in the annual opening game of the season Ukrainian Super Cup, meeting the champions Dynamo Kyiv. After a 0–0 draw at full-time, Vorskla lost the cup to Dynamo on penalties.

One of the biggest successes of Vorskla in European competition was their qualification to the 2011–12 UEFA Europa League group phase.

On 26 July 2014, the club's president Oleh Babayev was shot dead, while police has opened a criminal cases under Article “premeditated murder".

In the 2017–18 season, the club finished third in the top division for the first time since the 1996–97 season.

On 1 June 2025, Vorskla were relegated to First League after drawing 2-2 against FC Kudrivka on aggregate and losing 4-3 on penalties, ending 29 years in the top flight.

Following the winter break of the 2025–26 season in the First League, there were rumors that Vorskla may not return to competitions.

On 31 March 2026, it was announced that Kostiantyn Zhevago and the club's leadership were removed from the club, including the club's president, Roman Cherniak. Earlier, in Paris, Zhevago received a notice of suspicion from Ukrainian law enforcement agents. The same day, the club presented its new management team headed by the new general director, Maksym Harus. Zhevago called the process as a corporate raid.

While playing in the 2025–26 season in the First League, the club came under strict sanctions from FIFA, restricting them from registering new players. In April of 2026, Vorskla hired Volodymyr Chesnakov as a sports director voluntarily (на громадських засадах) to ensure that the club would stay in the First League.

== Club's infrastructure and departments ==
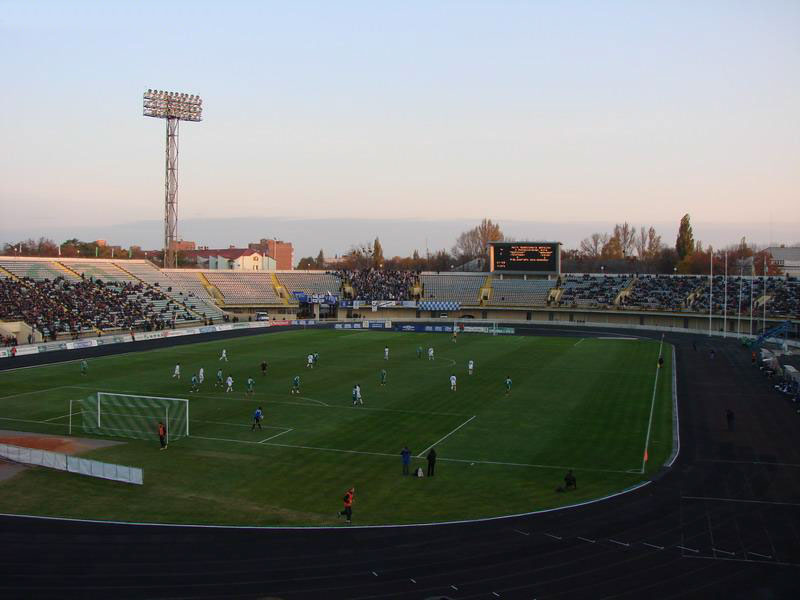
The stadium "Vorksla" ("Kolos") in the Poltava city's center

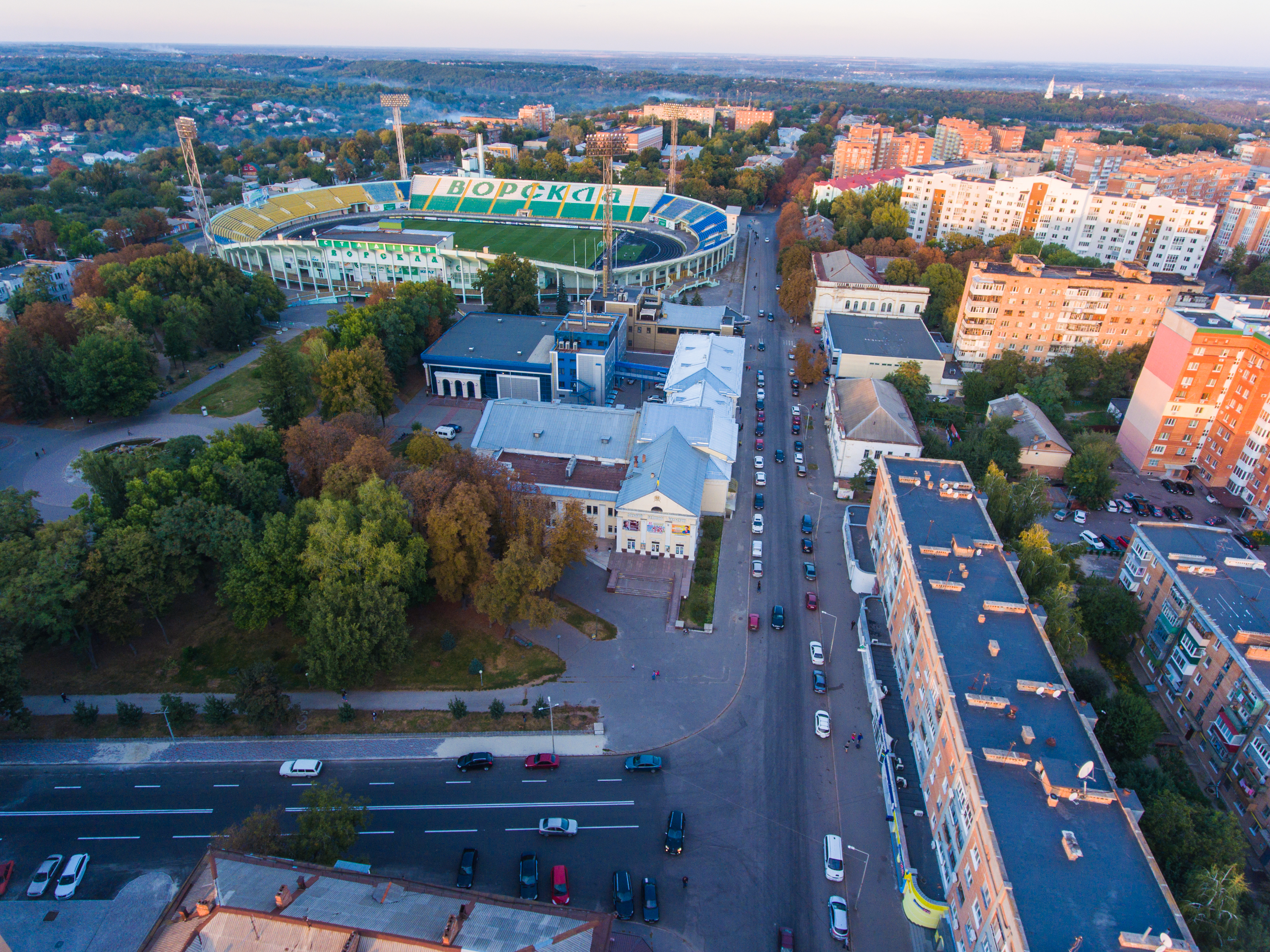
View of the stadium within the city

=== Stadiums and training facilities ===
The first team plays its home matches at Butovsky Memorial Vorskla Stadium, which is named after one of the founders of the modern Olympic Games and the International Olympic Committee in 1894, Oleksiy Butovskiy. Vorskla plays its games at Oleksiy Butovskyi Vorskla Stadium (Ukrainian: Стадіон «Ворскла» імені Олексія Бутовського). Vorskla has been playing there since 1955. The stadium underwent significant reconstruction between 1968 and 1975, and again between 1995 and 2000.

In 2021, on the northern outskirts of Poltava, a smaller stadium with an artificial turf "Molodizhnyi" was built. It was built in place of a smaller sports field belonging to the local bankrupt factory. Vorskla uses the stadium for its reserve teams.

=== Reserve teams, women teams, and farm-clubs ===
Vorskla has several reserve teams, among which are Vorskla U-19 and Vorskla U-21 that are playing in the Ukrainian Premier Reserve League.

There was also FC Vorskla-2 Poltava.

In 2021, Vorskla adopted WFC Zhytlobud-2 Kharkiv, which was gaining momentum. The team was integrated into the club, becoming Vorskla Poltava.

== Supporters & Rivalries ==
=== Fans and supporters ===
Due to censorship in the Soviet Union, development of fan movement in Poltava could be traced as far as 1985. Then on the stadium began to appear first green-white scarves and fan chants. In the 1990s, fans began to actively go abroad. In particular Vorskla fans were present at the legendary match between Ukraine and Russia October 9, 1999 in Moscow. European competition games with FC Daugava from Latvia and Anderlecht from Brussels in 1997 allowed fans try their hand on the European stage.

The largest fan club is known as the Crew of Golden Eagle.

Vorskla maintains friendly relations with Shakhtar Donetsk and Chornomorets Odesa fans. Strained relations with: Metalist Kharkiv, Karpaty Lviv, Dynamo Kyiv, Dnipro Dnipropetrovsk, Zorya Luhansk and Obolon Kyiv. Now all fans have declared a truce because of the war in Eastern Ukraine.

=== Rivalries ===
The club participates in regional rivalry with the main Kremenchuk city club Kremin at least since the Soviet period in the third tier (Second League).

== Honours ==
- Ukrainian Premier League
  - Third place (2): 1996–97, 2017–18
- Ukrainian Cup
  - Winner (1): 2008–09
  - Runners-up (1): 2019–20, 2023–24
- Ukrainian Persha Liha
  - Winner (1): 1995–96
- Football championship of the Ukrainian SSR (part of the Soviet Second League)
  - Runners-up (1): 1988
- Football Cup of the Ukrainian SSR
  - Winner (1): 1956
- Ukrainian KFK competitions (amateur competitions)
  - Winners (1): 1986

== Kit manufacturers and sponsors ==
Years	Football kit	Shirt sponsor
2000–01	Lotto/Adidas	–
2001–03	Adidas	–
2002–04	Puma	НАФТОГАЗ; України
2004–05	Puma/Lotto	НАФТОГАЗ; України
2005–06	Adidas/Puma	FERREXPO; Poltava Mining
2006–07	Adidas	FERREXPO; Poltava Mining
2006–07	Adidas	FERREXPO
2007–14	Adidas	FERREXPO
2019–	Nike	FERREXPO

== Players ==
=== Current squad ===
As of 1 March 2026

Note: Flags indicate national team as defined under FIFA eligibility rules; some limited exceptions apply. Players may hold more than one non-FIFA nationality.

No.	Pos.	Nation	Player
2	DF	UKR	Taras Dmytruk
5	MF	UKR	Dmytro Prikhna
7	FW	UKR	Vladyslav Voytsekhovskyi
8	MF	UKR	Vadym Horbunov
9	FW	UKR	Matviy Burenko
10	MF	UKR	Timofiy Mosiyenko
11	FW	UKR	Anton Baydal
14	DF	NGR	Prince Chisom Chibueze
15	MF	UKR	Ivan Piddubniy
17	MF	UKR	Vladyslav Semotyuk
20	FW	UKR	Maksym Andrushchenko

No.	Pos.	Nation	Player
21	DF	UKR	Vladyslav Dvorovenko
22	MF	GEO	Ivane Potskhveria
23	DF	UKR	Mykhaylo Shershen
29	DF	UKR	Vadym Chervak
32	DF	UKR	Daniil Romanenko
37	MF	UKR	Zakhar Karpus
43	DF	UKR	Eduard Romanets
51	GK	UKR	Danyil Hrechko
52	MF	UKR	Nikita Krokhmal
77	MF	UKR	Aleks Chidomere
99	FW	UKR	Artem Serdyuk

=== Out on loan ===
Note: Flags indicate national team as defined under FIFA eligibility rules; some limited exceptions apply. Players may hold more than one non-FIFA nationality.

No. / Pos. / Nation / Player	No. / Pos. / Nation / Player

== Notable players ==
Had international caps for their respective countries. Players whose name is listed in bold represented their countries while playing for Vorskla Poltava.

Soviet Union

- (Soviet Union) Vitaliy Starukhin
- (Soviet Union) Ivan Yaremchuk
- (Soviet Union) Evgeniy Yarovenko

Ukraine

- (Ukraine) Oleksiy Antyukhin
- (Ukraine) Serhiy Bezhenar
- (Ukraine) **Roman Bezus**
- (Ukraine) Stanislav Bohush
- (Ukraine) **Denys Dedechko**
- (Ukraine) **Artem Hromov**
- (Ukraine) (Turkmenistan) **Andriy Khomyn**
- (Ukraine) **Yuriy Kolomoyets**
- (Ukraine) Viktor Korniyenko
- (Ukraine) Ihor Kostyuk
- (Ukraine) Oleksandr Kovpak
- (Ukraine) Andriy Kovtun
- (Ukraine) **Oleh Krasnopyorov**
- (Ukraine) **Serhiy Kravchenko**
- (Ukraine) **Denys Kulakov**
- (Ukraine) Serhiy Lezhentsev
- (Ukraine) **Mykola Matviyenko**
- (Ukraine) Oleksandr Melashchenko
- (Ukraine) Yuriy Moroz
- (Ukraine) Volodymyr Musolitin
- (Ukraine) Serhiy Myakushko
- (Ukraine) Volodymyr Mykytin
- (Ukraine) Serhiy Nahornyak
- (Ukraine) Denys Oliynyk
- (Ukraine) Denys Onyshchenko
- (Ukraine) Hennadiy Orbu
- (Ukraine) Oleksandr Poklonskyi
- (Ukraine) Vladyslav Prudius
- (Ukraine) Adrian Pukanych
- (Ukraine) Andriy Pyatov
- (Ukraine) Andriy Pylyavskyi
- (Ukraine) **Dmytro Riznyk**
- (Ukraine) Oleksandr Romanchuk
- (Ukraine) Oleksandr Rykun
- (Ukraine) **Yevhen Selin**
- (Ukraine) Bohdan Shust
- (Ukraine) Anton Shynder
- (Ukraine) Oleksandr Svystunov
- (Ukraine) Eduard Tsykhmeystruk
- (Ukraine) Valeriy Vorobyov
- (Ukraine) **Hryhoriy Yarmash**
- (Ukraine) Serhiy Zakarlyuka
- (Ukraine) Oleksandr Zotov

Europe

- (Albania) **Debatik Curri**
- (Albania) **Armend Dallku**
- (Albania) **Ahmed Januzi**
- (Albania) (North Macedonia) **Taulant Seferi**
- (Albania) **Ardit Toli**
- (Armenia) **Gegham Kadimyan**
- (Azerbaijan) Elman Sultanov
- (Belarus) Mihail Makowski
- (Belarus) **Uladzimir Makowski**
- (Bulgaria) Yordan Petkov
- (Croatia) Mladen Bartulović
- (Estonia) **Joonas Tamm**
- (Estonia) Bogdan Vaštšuk
- (Georgia (country)) **Lasha Jakobia**
- (Georgia (country)) **Aleksandre Kobakhidze**
- (Georgia (country)) Giorgi Tsitaishvili
- (Greece) Panagiotis Lagos
- (Kazakhstan) Sergey Kostyuk
- (Kazakhstan) Dmytro Nepohodov
- (Kosovo) **Ardin Dallku**
- (Kosovo) Ismet Munishi
- (Lithuania) Andrius Jokšas
- (Luxembourg) **Olivier Thill**
- (Luxembourg) **Vincent Thill**
- (Moldova) **Sergiu Epureanu**
- (Moldova) Vladislav Lungu
- (Moldova) **Alexandru Onica**
- (Montenegro) Demir Škrijelj
- (North Macedonia) **Filip Despotovski**
- (North Macedonia) **Adis Jahović**
- (North Macedonia) Hristijan Kirovski
- (North Macedonia) Ennur Totre
- (North Macedonia) **Gjoko Zajkov**
- (Serbia and Montenegro) Jovan Markoski
- (Slovenia) Zoran Pavlović

Africa

- (Mali) **Ibrahim Kane**
- (Niger) **Najeeb Yakubu**
- (Nigeria) Lucky Idahor
- (Nigeria) **Chukwudi Nworgu**
- (Nigeria) Emmanuel Okoduwa
- (Nigeria) Harrison Omoko
- (Tanzania) Yohana Mkomola
- (Tunisia) **Sofiane Melliti**

Asia

- (Kyrgyzstan) Oleksandr Aharin
- (Kyrgyzstan) Vitaliy Kobzar
- (Tajikistan) Rustam Khaidaraliyev
- (Tajikistan) Vazgen Manasyan
- (Turkmenistan) **Nazar Baýramow**
- (Turkmenistan) **Rasim Kerimow**
- (Turkmenistan) Igor Kislov
- (Turkmenistan) **Guwançmuhammet Öwekow**
- (Uzbekistan) **Sanzhar Tursunov**

North America

- (Costa Rica) **Fernán Faerrón**

== Coaches and administration ==
Administration	Coaching (main team)	Coaching (U-19 team)
Honorary president – (Ukraine) Kostyantyn Zhevaho; President – (Ukraine) Roman Chernyak; Vice-president – (Ukraine) Oleh Lysak; Vice-president – (Ukraine) Hennadiy Muzyka; Advisor – (Ukraine) Hennadiy Slyusaryev; Sporting director – (Ukraine) Oleksandr Funderat	Head coach – (Ukraine) Valeriy Kutsenko (interim); Assistant coach – (Ukraine) Valeriy Kutsenko; Assistant coach – (Ukraine) Volodymyr Belakov; Goalkeeping coach – (Ukraine) Dmytro Stoyko; Fitness coach – (Ukraine) Serhiy Prykhodko	Head coach – vacant; Assistant coach – vacant; Assistant coach – (Ukraine) Pavlo Rebenok; Goalkeeping coach – (Ukraine) Oleh Morhun

== Presidents and owners ==
=== Owners ===
- 1955–1968 Agricultural trade unions, Kolos (Kolhospnyk) sports society
- 1969–1972 Poltava Oblast department of agricultural construction
- 1973–1982 Agricultural trade unions, Kolos sports society
- 2000–2004 Naftogaz
- 2005– Finance and Credit holding company

=== Presidents ===
- 2000–2004 Valentyn Ulyanov
- 2005–2014 Oleh Babayev (Kremenchukmyaso)
- 2016– Roman Chernyak (AvtoKrAZ)

Notes:

- Kremenchukmyaso, Finance and Credit bank, Ferrexpo, and AvtoKrAZ are part of a holding company Finance and Credit owned by Kostiantyn Zhevaho, who, since 2005, has been appointed as the "honorary" president.

== Managers ==
- (Soviet Union) Kostyantyn Skrypchenko (1955 – April 1955)
- (Soviet Union) Anatoliy Zubrytskyi (April 1955 – December 1956)
- (Soviet Union) Andriy Zhyhan (January 1957 – April 1957)
- (Soviet Union) Yosyp Lifshyts (April 1957 – December 1958)
- (Soviet Union) Oleksandr Zahretskyi (January 1959 – June 1959)
- (Soviet Union) Hennadiy Duhanov (July 1959 – July 1960)
- (Soviet Union) Viktor Zhyltsov (August 1960 – July 1964)
- (Soviet Union) Kostyantyn Skrypchenko (interim) (July 1964 – August 1964)
- (Soviet Union) Hryhoriy Balaba (August 1964 – July 1965)
- (Soviet Union) Kostyantyn Skrypchenko (July 1965 – October 1965)
- (Soviet Union) Viktor Zhyltsov (January 1966 – December 1966)
- (Soviet Union) Volodymyr Aksyonov (January 1967 – October 1967)
- (Soviet Union) Oleksandr Alpatov (December 1968 – August 1970)
- (Soviet Union) Yuriy Voynov (September 1970 – July 1972)
- (Soviet Union) Oleksandr Alpatov (July 1972 – July 1973)
- (Soviet Union) Viktor Nosov (July 1973 – November 1974)
- (Soviet Union) Anatoliy Vitkov (December 1974 – May 1976)
- (Soviet Union) Vasyl Salkov (May 1976 – December 1976)
- (Soviet Union) Stanislav Basyuk (January 1977 – May 1980)
- (Soviet Union) Volodymyr Aksyonov (May 1980 – May 1982)
- (Soviet Union) Hennadiy Putivskyi (May 1982 – November 1982)
- (Soviet Union) Viktor Pozhechevskyi (February 1984 – January 1990)
- (Soviet Union) Hennadiy Lysenchuk (January 1990 – August 1990)
- (Soviet Union) Viktor Pozhechevskyi (August 1990 – November 1990)
- (Soviet Union) Vladimir Khodus (January 1991 – August 1991)
- (Ukraine) Leonid Koltun (February 1992)
- (Ukraine) Serhiy Dotsenko (March 1992 – July 1992)
- (Ukraine) Volodymyr Bryukhtiy (July 1992 – July 1993)
- (Ukraine) Viktor Maslov (July 1993 – November 1993)
- (Ukraine) Viktor Pozhechevskyi (January 1994 – June 1998)
- (Ukraine) Oleksandr Dovbiy (June 1998 – August 1998)
- (Ukraine) Serhiy Sobetskyi and (Ukraine) Ivan Shariy
  (interim) (August 1998 – October 1998)
- (Ukraine) Anatoliy Konkov (October 1998 – August 2000)
- (Ukraine) Serhiy Morozov (August 2000 – June 2001)
- (Ukraine) Andriy Bal (1 July 2001 – 18 August 2003)
- (Ukraine) Oleh Morhun (interim) (August 2003)
- (Russia) Oleg Dolmatov (August 2003 – October 2003)
- (Ukraine) Oleh Morhun (interim) (October 2003 – December 2003)
- (Ukraine) Volodymyr Lozynskyi (December 2003 – July 2004)
- (Ukraine) Volodymyr Muntyan (1 July 2004 – 16 June 2005)
- (Ukraine) Viktor Nosov (17 June 2005 – 30 June 2007)
- (Ukraine) Anatoliy Momot (interim) (6 July 2007 – 27 December 2007)
- (Ukraine) Mykola Pavlov (27 December 2007 – 29 May 2012)
- (Ukraine) Vadym Yevtushenko (6 June 2012 – 15 August 2012)
- (Ukraine) Serhiy Svystun (interim) (15 August 2012 – 15 December 2012)
- (Ukraine) Serhiy Svystun (15 December 2012 – 10 June 2013)
- (Ukraine) Anatoliy Momot (interim) (4 July 2013 – 22 June 2014)
- (Ukraine) Vasyl Sachko (22 June 2014 – 27 March 2019)
- (Ukraine) Vitaliy Kosovskyi (interim) (28 March 2019 – 3 June 2019)
- (Ukraine) Vitaliy Kosovskyi (4 June 2019 – 14 November 2019)
- (Ukraine) Yuriy Maksymov (15 November 2019 – 31 May 2022)
- (Ukraine) Viktor Skrypnyk (1 July 2022 – 19 December 2023)
- (Ukraine) Serhiy Dolhanskyi (interim) (4 January 2024 – 30 June 2024)
- (Ukraine) Serhiy Dolhanskyi (1 July 2024 – 23 October 2024)
- (Ukraine) Yuriy Maksymov (24 October 2024 – 10 June 2025)
- (Serbia) Željko Ljubenović (24 June 2025 – 10 July 2025)
- (Ukraine) Oleksandr Babych (13 July 2025 – 9 October 2025)
- (Ukraine) Valeriy Kutsenko (interim) (10 October 2025 – present)

== League and Cup history ==
Tier	Years	Last	Promotions	Relegations
First League (tier 2)	8	1969	never	▼2 (1969)
Second League (tier 3)	23	1991	▲1 (1967)	never
31 years of professional football in Soviet Union since 1957

Tier	Years	Last	Promotions	Relegations
Premier League (tier 1)	29	2024–25	10 times to Europe	▼1 (2024–25)
First League (tier 2)	6	1995–96	▲1 (1995–96)	▼1 (2025–26)
34 years of professional national football in Ukraine since 1992

=== European record ===
Its first European competition participation occurred in 1997–98 season in UEFA Cup. Vorskla played its first game at this level away at Daugava Stadium in Riga on July 23, 1997, against the Latvian club Daugava Rīga.

Vorskla did not achieve any noticeable feats yet managed to qualify on couple of occasions to the Europe League group stage. Reaching the group stage of the UEFA Europe League in 2011, it has been the highest achievement in European competitions to this date.
