= Vyacheslav Nivinskyi =

Ukrainian footballer and coach

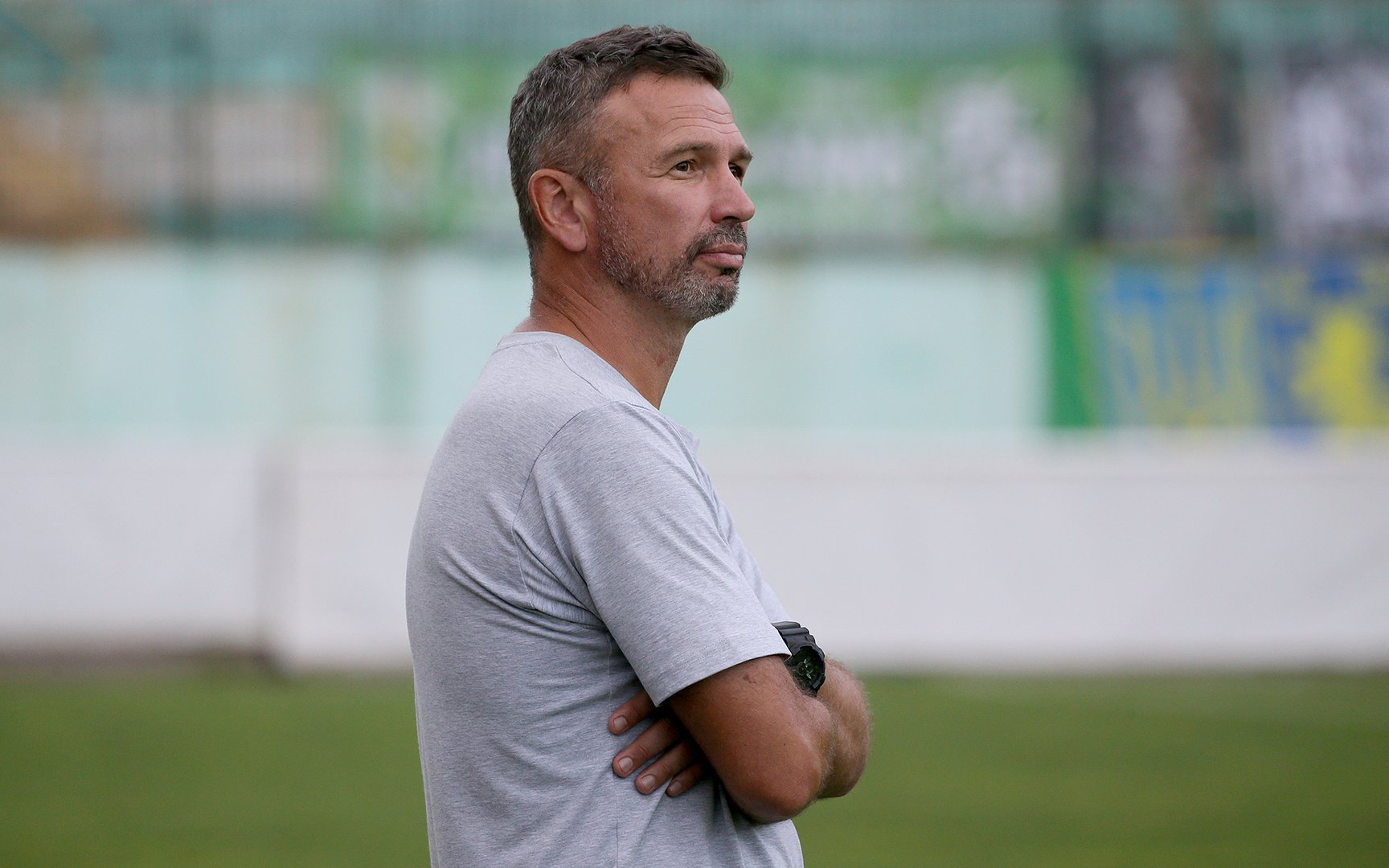

Personal information
- Full name: Vyacheslav Mykolayovych Nivinskyi
- Date of birth: 31 March 1974 (age 52)
- Place of birth: Kyiv, Ukrainian SSR
- Height: 1.82 m (6 ft 0 in)
- Position: Defender

Team information
- Current team: Tatran Prešov (assistant)

Senior career*
Years	Team	Apps	(Gls)
1992–1993	Nyva-Borysfen Myronivka	8	(0)
1993–1995	Nyva Myronivka	50	(0)
1995–2005	Obolon Kyiv	229	(12)
1998	→ Metalurh Zaporizhia (loan)	6	(0)
1999–2005	→ Obolon-2 Kyiv	13	(0)
2005–2006	Kryvbas Kryvyi Rih	19	(0)
2006–2007	Simurq PIK	20	(0)
2007–2009	Obolon Kyiv	37	(1)
2008	→ Obolon-2 Kyiv	8	(1)

Managerial career
- 2009–2010: Obolon Kyiv (youth assistant)
- 2010–2011: Obolon Kyiv (assistant)
- 2012: Obolon Kyiv (youth)
- 2012: Obolon-2 Kyiv
- 2012–2015: Ukraine U-21 (assistant)
- 2016: Trakai (assistant)
- 2017–2018: Tatran Prešov (assistant)
- 2019–2020: Obolon Kyiv (assistant)
- 2020–2021: Chornomorets Odesa (assistant)
- 2021–2022: AFSC Kyiv
- 2022–2023: Kryvbas Kryvyi Rih (youth assistant)
- 2025: Vorskla-2 Poltava
- 2025: Vorskla Poltava (youth)
- 2025–: Livyi Bereh-2 Kyiv
- 2025–: Livyi Bereh Kyiv (caretaker)
- * Club domestic league appearances and goals

Vyacheslav Nivinskyi (Ukrainian: В'ячеслав Миколайович Нівінський; born 31 March 1974) is a retired Ukrainian football player and current coach.

== Career ==
Nivinskyi started to play football in his native city Kyiv. His first professional team was FC Nyva-Borysfen Myronivka. From there he joined the team Nyva Myronivka in the Kyiv Oblast. In July 1995 he moved to Obolon Kyiv. As a member of the Kyiv club, she spent 14 years (with interruptions), where he finished his playing career in 2009. He also played in Azerbaijan for Simurq PIK.

By the number of matches for FC Obolon he ranks the first – 266 matches, in which 13 goals scored.

As a coach Nivinskyi very often co-operated together with Serhiy Kovalets, and in October 2017 he became an assistant manager to Tatran Prešov.

In 2019–2021 he again worked with Serhiy Kovalets in FC Obolon Kyiv and then FC Chornomorets Odesa. In 2021 Nivinskyi accepted an offer to manage the newly formed AFSC Kyiv.
