= Andriy Khomyn (footballer, born 1968) =

Ukrainian footballer

Personal information
- Full name: Andriy Romanovych Khomyn
- Date of birth: 24 May 1968
- Place of birth: Ivano-Frankivsk, Ukrainian SSR
- Date of death: 29 September 1999 (aged 31)
- Place of death: near Ivano-Frankivsk, Ukraine
- Height: 1.79 m (5 ft 10 1/2 in)
- Position: Defender

Senior career*
| Years | Team | Apps | (Gls) |
| 1988 | Prykarpattya Ivano-Frankivsk | 20 | (0) |
| 1989 | Metalist Kharkiv | 0 | (0) |
| 1989–1993 | Prykarpattya Ivano-Frankivsk | 191 | (13) |
| 1993–1996 | Dynamo Kyiv | 47 | (3) |
| 1995 | → Dynamo-2 Kyiv | 3 | (0) |
| 1996 | → Prykarpattya Ivano-Frankivsk (loan) | 14 | (4) |
| 1996–1999 | Vorskla Poltava | 74 | (9) |
| 1997 | → Vorskla-2 Poltava | 3 | (0) |
| 1998 | → Köpetdag Aşgabat (loan) | 0 | (0) |
| 1999 | Prykarpattya Ivano-Frankivsk | 4 | (0) |

International career
| 1993–1995 | Ukraine | 6 | (0) |
| 1998 | Turkmenistan | 2 | (1) |
- * Club domestic league appearances and goals

Andriy Romanovych Khomyn (24 May 1968 – 29 September 1999) was a professional footballer. He made his professional debut in the Soviet Second League in 1988 for FC Prykarpattya Ivano-Frankivsk. A former player for the Ukraine national team, he oped to play for the Turkmenistan national team.
