= Viktor Nosov (footballer) =

Soviet footballer and coach

Personal information
- Full name: Viktor Vasylyovych Nosov
- Date of birth: 19 July 1940
- Place of birth: Stalino, Ukrainian SSR
- Date of death: April 17, 2008 (aged 67)
- Place of death: Donetsk, Ukraine
- Height: 1.80 m (5 ft 11 in)
- Position: Defender

Youth career
- FC Shakhtar Stalino

Senior career*
Years	Team	Apps	(Gls)
1958–1960	FC Shakhtar Stalino	13	(0)
1960	FC CSKA Moscow	0	(0)
1961–1962	FC SKA Rostov-on-Don	28	(0)
1963–1964	FC Shakhtar Stalino	40	(0)
1965	FC Avanhard Kharkiv	36	(4)
1966	FC Shakhtar Donetsk	7	(0)
1967–1972	FC Budivelnyk Poltava	?	(?)

Managerial career
- 1972–1973: FC Shakhtar Makiivka (ass't)
- 1973–1974: FC Kolos Poltava
- 1975–1976: FC Kryvbas Kryvyi Rih (ass't)
- 1977–1978: FC Shakhtar Donetsk (ass't)
- 1979–1985: FC Shakhtar Donetsk
- 1986: Victory Sports Club
- 1989: FC Pakhtakor Tashkent
- 1990: FC Zorya Luhansk
- 1991: FC Dynamo Stavropol
- 1991–1992: FC Veres Rivne
- 1992: FC Temp Shepetivka (consultant)
- 1994–1996: FC Shakhtar-2 Donetsk
- 2003–2004: FC Vorskla-2 Poltava
- 2005–2007: FC Vorskla Poltava
- 2007: FC Vorskla Poltava (consultant)
- * Club domestic league appearances and goals

Viktor Nosov (Ukrainian: Віктор Васильович Носов; 19 July 1940 – 17 April 2008) was a Ukrainian footballer and coach. He is recognized as a Master of Sports of the Soviet Union and Merited Coach of Ukraine. While being led by Nosov, in 1979-1985 Shakhtar Donetsk won two Soviet Cups and became a runner-up of the Soviet Top League.

Nosov started out his playing career in 1958 in FC Shakhtar Donetsk. With Shakhtar and SKA Rostov-na-Donu, Nosov played some 88 games at the Soviet Top League.

He retired in 1972 with FC Budivelnyk Poltava. The same year he became a coach for FC Shakhtar Makiivka. Sometimes at the end of 1980s he coached Victory Sports Club from Maldives. With the fall of the Soviet Union, Nosov stayed in Ukraine and continued to coach Ukrainian teams.

In the beginning of April 2008 Nosov was hospitalized with abdominal angina at the Husak Institute of Urgent and Reconstructive Surgery in Donetsk. However soon after his surgery, he died.
