= Oleh Babaiev =

Ukrainian politician and businessman (1965–2014)

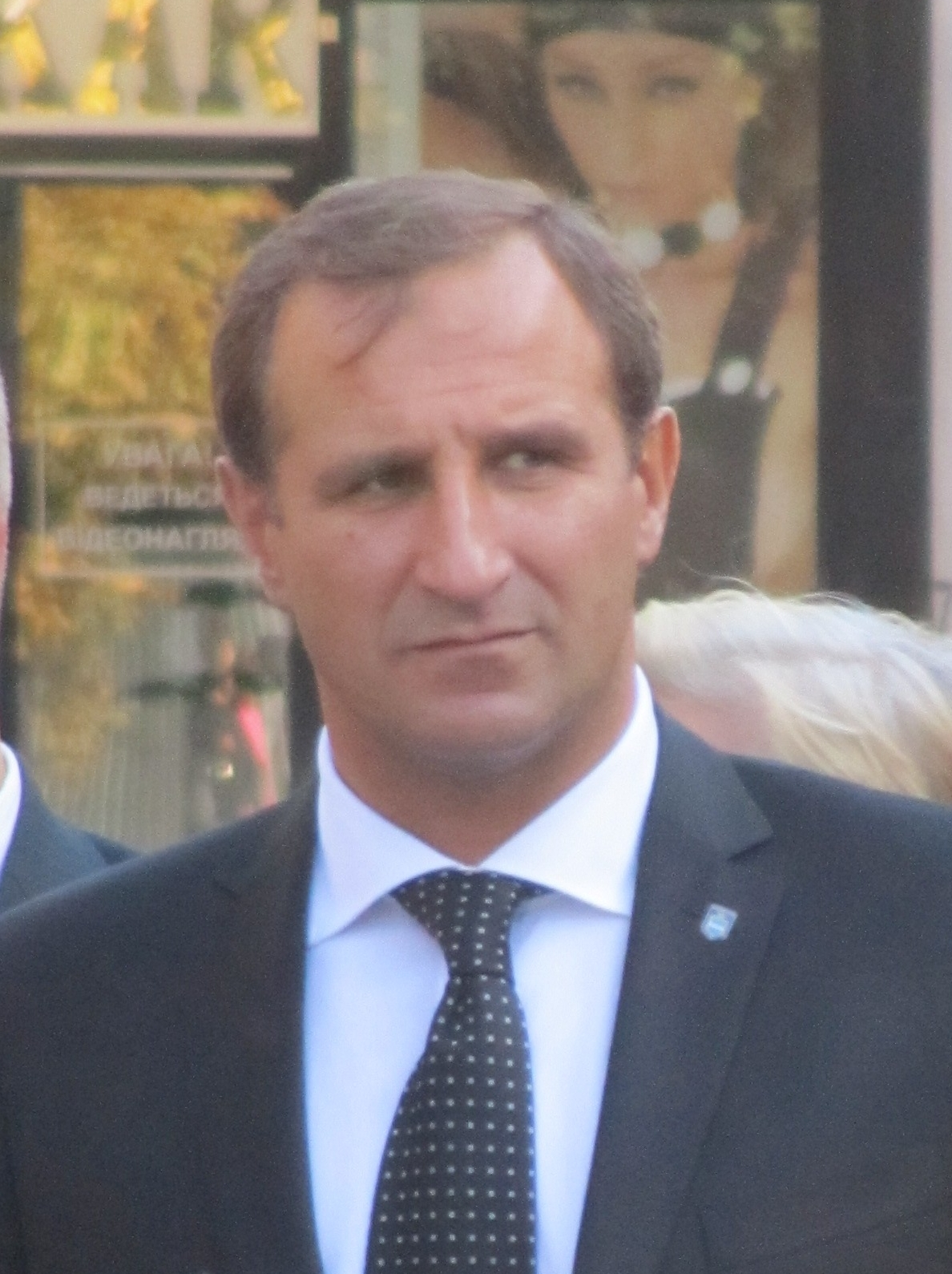

Mayor of Kremenchuk
- In office 2010–2014

Member of the Verkhovna Rada
- In office 2007–2010

Personal details
- Born: Oleh Meydanovych Babayev; October 21, 1965 Kursk, Russian SFSR, USSR
- Died: July 26, 2014 (aged 48) Kremenchuk, Ukraine
- Cause of death: Assassination by gunshots
- Party: All-Ukrainian Union "Fatherland" (until 2010)
- Education: Kyiv University

Oleh Meydanovych Babaiev (Ukrainian: Олег Мейданович Бабаєв; October 21, 1965 – July 26, 2014) was a Ukrainian politician and an owner of two professional football clubs in the Poltava Oblast. In 2010, he was elected Mayor of Kremenchuk. He was assassinated in his car in front of his house on July 26, 2014.

== Biography ==
Oleh Meydanovych Babaiev was born in 1965 in Kursk, Russian SFSR. He was of Azerbaijani descent. After completing high school in Kursk in 1982, he studied at the Higher Military-Political College in Minsk and graduated in 1986. He eventually moved to Ukraine, while his parents remained residents of Kursk. In 2000, he graduated from Kyiv University.

From 1986 to 1990 Babaiev served in the Soviet Army. He was stationed in the Soviet Union's Far East and later in Czechoslovakia. After the fall of communism in Eastern Europe, Babaiev's unit withdrew from Czechoslovakia and he was stationed in Kyiv. In 1990, he obtained Ukrainian citizenship. After the dissolution of the Soviet Union, Babaiev served as a reserve officer in the Ukrainian army until 1996, eventually reaching the rank of colonel. He became Chairman of JSC Kremenchukmyaso in 1998 and President of a football club, FC Vorskla Poltava, in 2005. He was also the honorary president of FC Kremin Kremenchuk (lower leagues).

Babaiev was elected to the Verkhovna Rada (Ukrainian Parliament) in the 2007 parliamentary election. He was a member of the All-Ukrainian Union "Fatherland", but left the party in late 2010 after he was elected Mayor of Kremenchuk (with 42.34% of the votes), stating that "The mayor should be apolitical". As mayor, Oleh Babaiev was perhaps best known for the recreational projects he promoted within the city. Being an avid sportsman, Babaiev invested heavily in rebuilding the aging Soviet-era parks and sports stadiums within the city. Some of the most notable parks to be restored under Babaiev's tenure as mayor of Kremenchuk were the October Square, later renamed Babaiev Square after his honor, and the 18-hectare (44-acre) Pridneprovsky Park in the city's center.

== Death ==
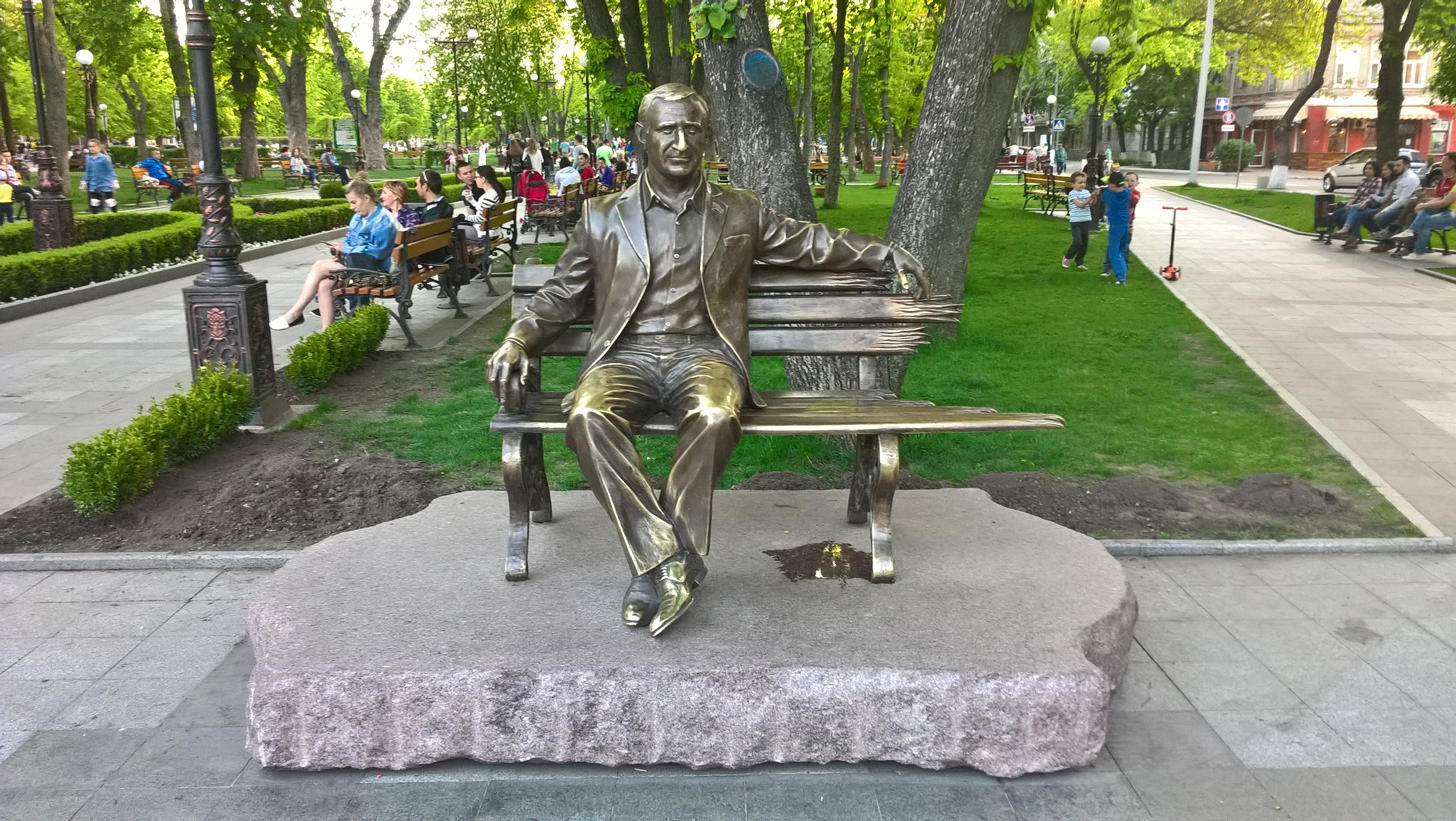
Memorial to Oleh Babaiev located in Kremenchuk

Babaiev was shot dead on July 26, 2014. According to the Ukrainian Interior Ministry, he was killed in his car in front of his house when an unidentified person fired three shots from a gun with a silencer from another car. 50,000 people attended his funeral, including Kyiv mayor Vitali Klitschko. On January 19, 2015, a memorial to Oleh Babaiev was unveiled in Kremenchuk; it had been financed by the slain mayor's friends, and was opened by Babaiev's parents. It is located in one of the city parks that the mayor was instrumental in restoring.
