= Aleksei Butovsky =

Russian general and Olympic founder (1838–1917)

- Алексей Дмитриевич Бутовский
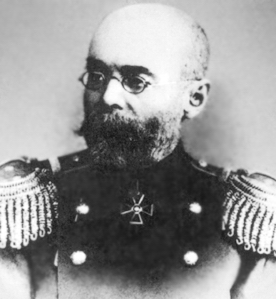
- Born: June 9, 1838; Pyatyhirtsi, Poltava Governorate, Russian Empire
- Died: February 25, 1917 (aged 78); Petrograd, Russian Empire
- Citizenship: Russian
- Occupations: Military officer, educator, sports functionary
- Known for: One of the founders of the IOC

Aleksei Dmitrievich Butovsky (Russian: Алексей Дмитриевич Бутовский; Ukrainian: Олексій Дмитрович Бутовський; June 9, 1838 – February 25, 1917) was a Russian general and one of the founders of the International Olympic Committee. He held the rank of lieutenant general in the Imperial Russian Army, taught at the Poltava Cadet Corps, and was a sports functionary.

== Biography ==
Butovsky was born on June 9, 1838, in the village of Pyatyhirtsi (near city of Lubny) to the family of Dmitri Butovsky, a retired military junior officer (stabskapitän) of Ukrainian (Cossack) origin that has been accepted into the Russian dvoryanstvo (nobility), and his wife Nadiya Reiser. In his youth he studied English, German and French, graduated from a special boarding school, served as a tutor of Military science at the Poltava Cadet Corps, and studied at the Nikolaevsky Engineering-Technical University.

This work, as well as service in the regular army what participated in combat, cooperation with the Main Directorate of Military Educational Institutions allowed Butovsky understand the importance of the physical education in preparing future officers. Along with performing regular duties education officer Aleksei was initiated in high school classes in gymnastics, fencing, outdoor games, read them developed a course on theory and techniques of gymnastics and physical exercises. In the late 80-s of the 19th century Aleksei Butovsky became one of the most popular experts in the field of physical education, his name was well known abroad. After one of the trips abroad, he noted with regret that in many countries the problem of physical education understood and supported in the power echelons, and in Russia, these issues have been neglected.

Aleksei Butovsky and Pierre de Coubertin periodically met and regular corresponded in French, a language Aleksei knew very well. They met in 1892 in France, where on orders of military departments of Russia, Butovsky studied the training of gymnasts and fencers. Convened de Coubertin Congress defined the timing and venue of the first two modern Olympics - Athens and Paris, 1896 and 1900 - and chose the first members of the IOC. Naturally, from Russia to it came General Butovsky.

In 1896 Aleksei Butovsky attended as a member of the IOC at the Olympic Games in Athens. Butovsky outlined details of the first modern Olympics in the book "Athens in the spring of 1896" - the first and the only one Russian-language publication devoted to this historic event.

He died in Petrograd in 1917 in the rank of General of the Infantry during the events of the February Revolution.
