= Mikhail Stakhursky =

Mikhail Mikhailovich Stakhursky (Russian: Михаил Михайлович Стахурский; 24 January [O.S. 11 January] 1903 – 10 April 1971) was a Soviet Lieutenant General and the head of several regional party committees in the Ukrainian SSR.

Born in the Podolian Governorate in 1903, he joined the Communist Party in 1921. He served in the Red Army from 1919 to 1923, and again from 1925 to 1927.

During World War II he served as a member of different military councils in the Red Army, including the 21st Army, the 24th Army, the Central Front, the 1st Belorussian Front, and the Second Ukrainian Front.

After the war, from 1945 to 1961, he served as the First Secretary of four regional party committees, including three in Ukraine (Vinnytsia Oblast from 1945–1951, Poltava Oblast from 1951–1955, and Zhytomyr Oblast from 1957–1961) and one in Russia (Khabarovsk Krai from 1955–1957).

He was also a member of the Central Committee of the Communist Party of the Ukrainian SSR from 1949–1956 and 1960–1961 and of the Central Committee of the Communist Party of the Soviet Union from 1956–1961.
