= Kremenchukmyaso =

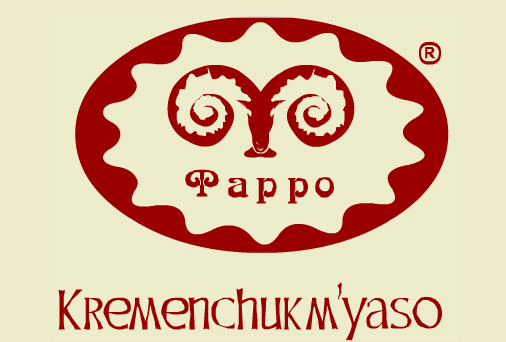
- Company type: Private Joint-stock Company
- Industry: meat packing industry
- Founded: 1913
- Headquarters: Kremenchuk, Ukraine
- Area served: Ukraine
- Owner: Oleh Babaiev
- Parent: Finances and Credit
- Website: https://farro.org.ua/en/

OJSC Kremenchukmyaso (Ukrainian: ПрАТ Кременчукм’ясо) is a Ukrainian Private Joint-stock Company that belongs to a Finances and Credit Group.

The company is located in Kremenchuk. It specializes in meat products and manufactures products under the Kremenchukmyaso brand.

== Sponsorship ==
Kremenchukmyaso currently sponsor football Kremin and Vorskla.

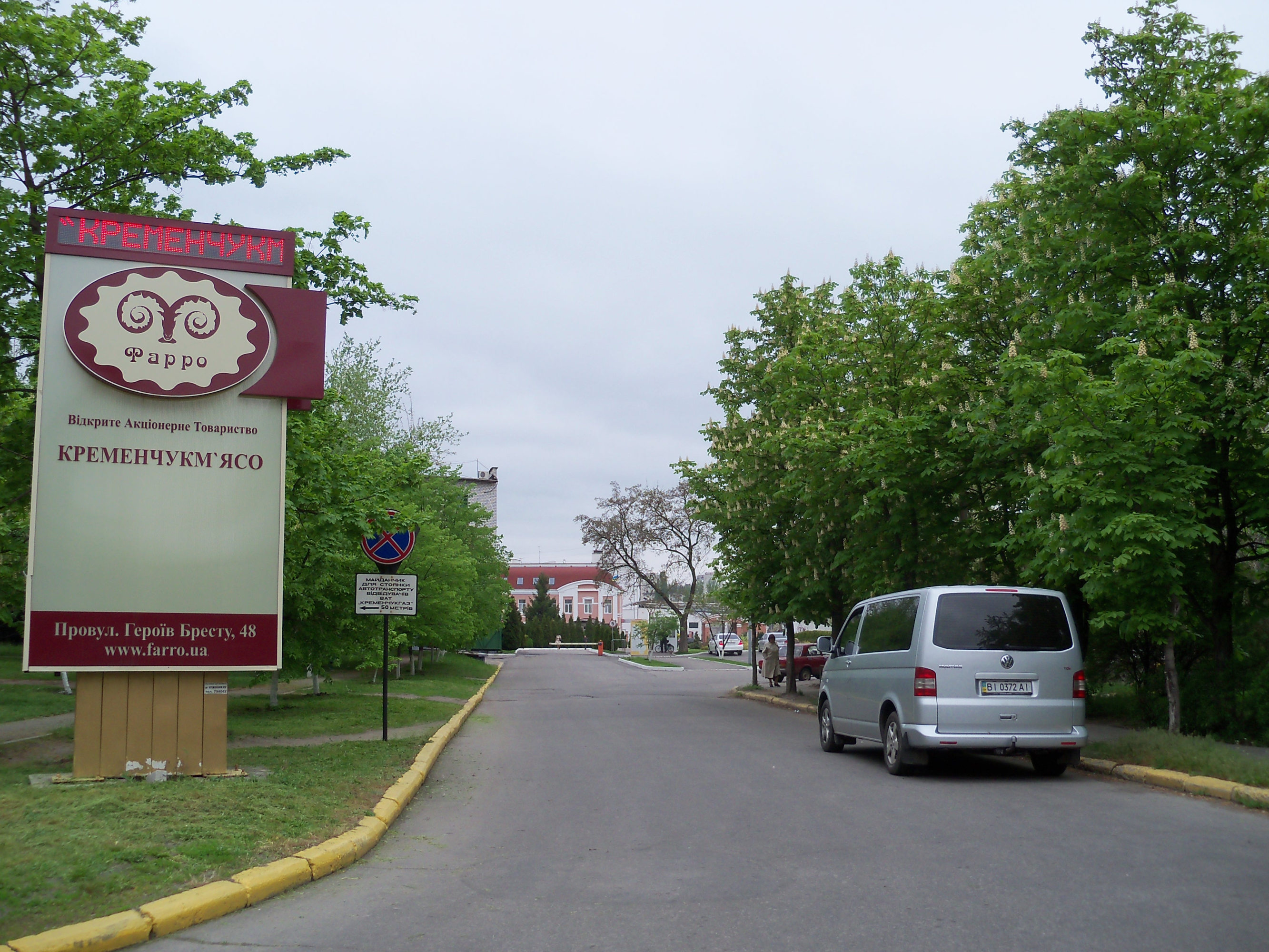
Entrance to company
