= Oleh Morhun =

Ukrainian football player (born 1965)

Personal information
- Full name: Oleh Anatoliyovych Morhun
- Date of birth: 10 January 1965 (age 61)
- Place of birth: Zaporizhzhia, Ukrainian SSR
- Height: 1.85 m (6 ft 1 in)
- Position: Goalkeeper

Team information
- Current team: Vorskla Poltava U-21 (assistant)

Youth career
- ????–1981: Kolos sports school Poltava

Senior career*
Years	Team	Apps	(Gls)
1981–1984	Tavriya Simferopol	45	(0)
1985	FShM Torpedo Moscow	19	(0)
1985–1986	CSKA Moscow	0	(0)
1986	→ CSKA-2 Moscow	11	(0)
1986	SKA Odesa	12	(0)
1987	Shakhtar Donetsk	0	(0)
1987–1991	Vorskla Poltava	155	(0)
1991–1993	Etar Veliko Tarnovo	47	(0)
1993–1995	Levski Sofia	7	(0)
1995–1999	Vorskla Poltava	29	(0)
1998–1999	→ Vorskla-2 Poltava	9	(0)

Managerial career
- 2002–2003: Vorskla-2 Poltava
- 2003: Vorskla Poltava
- 2007–2009: Poltava (assistant)
- 2010: Horpynka sports school Poltava (assistant)
- 2012–2013: Poltava (assistant)
- 2014–: Vorskla Poltava (U21 assistant)
- * Club domestic league appearances and goals

Oleh Anatoliyovych Morhun (Ukrainian: Олег Анатолійович Моргун; born 10 January 1965) is a former Soviet and Ukrainian footballer and Ukrainian football manager.

== Personal life ==
His son Valentyn Morhun is also a professional footballer for Dynamo Kyiv.
