= 1967 Soviet Class B =

Second League
- Season: 1967

1967 Soviet Class B was a Soviet football competition at the Soviet third tier.

The competition consisted of two stages and involved participation of 190 teams

- at the first stage 126 teams in seven groups of the Russian Federation identified the Russian Federation semifinal participants. In those groups also participated teams of Union republics other than Ukraine and Central Asia that identified participants of their semifinals. In two groups of Ukraine 42 teams identified participants of the Ukraine final tournament. Also, 22 more teams of the Central Asia and Kazakhstan played for their single berth to the Class A, Second Group.
- at the second stage participants of the Russian Federation and Union republics semifinals identified participants of the Russian Federation and Union republics finals. Then, teams from Ukraine, Russian Federation and Union republics in finals identified winners.

== Russian Federation ==
=== Semifinal Group 1 ===
[Astrakhan]

Pos	Team	Pld	W	D	L	GF	GA	GD	Pts
1	Volgar Astrakhan	4	2	2	0	5	3	+2	6
2	SKA Chita	4	1	3	0	3	2	+1	5
3	Metallurg Magnitogorsk	4	1	1	2	3	3	0	3
4	Dinamo-d Moskva	4	0	3	1	1	2	−1	3
5	Znamya Truda Orekhovo-Zuyevo	4	0	3	1	3	5	−2	3

=== Semifinal Group 2 ===
[Lipetsk]

Pos	Team	Pld	W	D	L	GF	GA	GD	Pts
1	Metallurg Lipetsk	4	3	1	0	8	2	+6	7
2	Zenit Izhevsk	4	2	2	0	6	4	+2	6
3	Metallurg Kuibyshev	4	0	3	1	1	2	−1	3
4	Molniya Moskva	4	1	1	2	2	4	−2	3
5	Mashinostroitel Pyatigorsk	4	0	1	3	2	7	−5	1

=== Semifinal Group 3 ===
[Makhachkala]

Pos	Team	Pld	W	D	L	GF	GA	GD	Pts
1	Dinamo Makhachkala	4	4	0	0	8	1	+7	8
2	Spartak Yoshkar-Ola	4	2	1	1	5	3	+2	5
3	Zvezda Serpukhov	4	1	1	2	2	6	−4	3
4	Spartak Kostroma	4	0	2	2	2	4	−2	2
5	Shakhtyor Kiselyovsk	4	1	0	3	1	4	−3	2

=== Semifinal Group 4 ===
[Ulyanovsk]

Pos	Team	Pld	W	D	L	GF	GA	GD	Pts
1	Volga Ulyanovsk	4	2	2	0	4	1	+3	6
2	Spartak Kislovodsk	4	2	1	1	4	2	+2	5
3	Angara Irkutsk	4	1	1	2	4	4	0	3
4	Torpedo Taganrog	4	0	3	1	2	4	−2	3
5	Dinamo Bryansk	4	1	1	2	3	6	−3	3

=== Final group ===
[Nov 5-25, Makhachkala, Astrakhan]

Pos	Team	Pld	W	D	L	GF	GA	GD	Pts
1	Dinamo Makhachkala	7	5	2	0	15	5	+10	12
2	Volga Ulyanovsk	7	4	1	2	11	7	+4	9
3	Volgar Astrakhan	7	4	1	2	8	7	+1	9
4	Spartak Yoshkar-Ola	7	4	1	2	6	6	0	9
5	Zenit Izhevsk	7	2	2	3	12	13	−1	6
6	Metallurg Lipetsk	7	1	4	2	7	8	−1	6
7	SKA Chita	7	1	1	5	8	12	−4	3
8	Spartak Kislovodsk	7	0	2	5	2	11	−9	2

== Ukraine ==
=== Final group ===
[Oct 24 – Nov 2, Severodonetsk, Kadiyevka]

Pos	Team	Pld	W	D	L	GF	GA	GD	Pts
1	Avtomobilist Zhitomir	5	4	1	0	7	2	+5	9
2	Khimik Severodonetsk	5	3	2	0	11	3	+8	8
3	Dnepr Kremenchug	5	2	1	2	2	2	0	5
4	Torpedo Kharkov	5	2	0	3	3	6	−3	4
5	Shakhtyor Kadiyevka	5	1	0	4	3	7	−4	2
6	Dnepr Cherkassy	5	1	0	4	4	10	−6	2

== Central Asia ==
Pos	Rep	Team	Pld	W	D	L	GF	GA	GD	Pts
1	UZB	Zarafshan Navoi	42	30	9	3	96	34	+62	69
2	UZB	Sverdlovets Tashkent Region	42	27	11	4	67	24	+43	65
3	KAZ	Metallurg Temirtau	42	20	14	8	51	31	+20	54
4	UZB	Sogdiana Samarkand (Note: Spartak Samarkand changed name to Sogdiana.)	42	17	17	8	40	32	+8	51
5	KAZ	Dinamo Tselinograd	42	17	14	11	57	46	+11	48
6	KAZ	ADK Alma-Ata	42	17	12	13	55	36	+19	46
7	KAZ	Metallurg Chimkent	42	16	14	12	51	44	+7	46
8	UZB	Pahtaaral Gulistan	42	18	10	14	45	43	+2	46
9	TJK	Vakhsh Nurek	42	18	9	15	51	47	+4	45
10	UZB	Ok-Oltyn Andizhan Region	42	17	11	14	44	50	−6	45
11	UZB	Spartak Andizhan	42	13	17	12	44	37	+7	43
12	KGZ	Alay Osh (Note: Shakhtyor Osh changed name to Alay.)	42	16	10	16	38	42	−4	42
13	UZB	Khimik Chirchik	42	13	12	17	41	36	+5	38
14	UZB	Akkurgan Tashkent Region (Note: Dimitrovets Tashkent Region changed name to Akkurgan.)	42	13	12	17	53	61	−8	38
15	UZB	Tselinnik Yangiyer	42	9	18	15	35	50	−15	36
16	TKM	Zahmet Charjou	42	12	11	19	40	49	−9	35
17	TJK	Pahtakor Kurgan-Tyube	42	11	13	18	32	54	−22	35
18	KAZ	Yenbek Jezkazgan	42	10	13	19	29	49	−20	33
19	UZB	Metallurg Almalyk	42	9	13	20	40	58	−18	31
20	KAZ	Voskhod Jambul (Note: Metallist Jambul changed name to Voskhod.)	42	9	11	22	36	57	−21	29
21	TKM	Murgab Mary	42	8	10	24	29	67	−38	26
22	UZB	Fakel Buhara (Note: Buhoro Buhara changed name to Fakel.)	42	9	7	26	29	56	−27	25

Source: rsssf.com

== Union republics ==
=== Final ===
[Nov 5, Chernigov]
Neman Grodno  1-0  Polad Sumgait
