= Viktor Pozhechevskyi =

Ukrainian footballer and manager (born 1951)

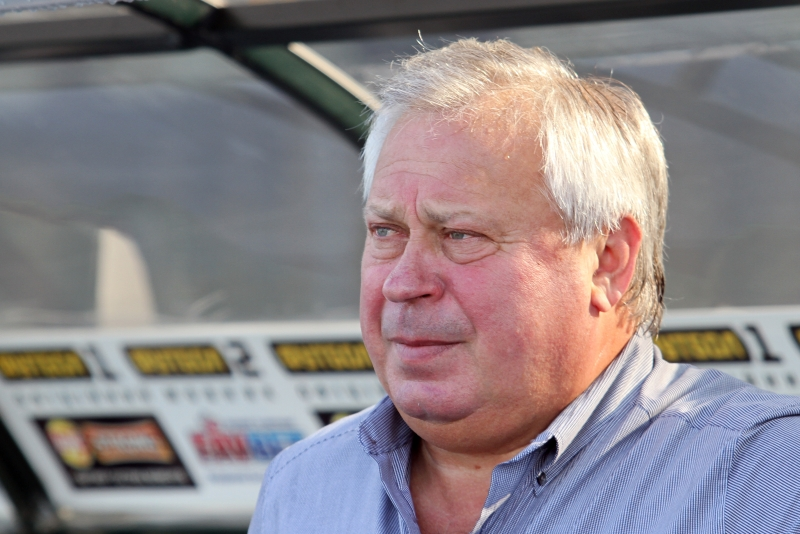

Personal information
- Full name: Viktor Oleksandrovych Pozhechevskyi
- Date of birth: 4 February 1951 (age 75)
- Place of birth: Poltava, USSR
- Height: 1.86 m (6 ft 1 in)
- Position: Defender

Senior career*
Years	Team	Apps	(Gls)
	Silbud Poltava	0	(0)
1974–1977	Sputnyk Poltava		

Managerial career
- 1981–1982: FC Kolos Poltava (administrator)
- 1986–1990: FC Vorskla Poltava
- 1994–1998: FC Vorskla Poltava
- 1998–1999: Köpetdag Aşgabat
- 1998–1999: Turkmenistan
- 1999–2000: FC Naftovyk-Ukrnafta Okhtyrka
- 2014: FC Poltava (director)
- 2015: FC Poltava (honorary president)
- * Club domestic league appearances and goals

Viktor Oleksandrovych Pozhechevskyi (Ukrainian: Віктор Олександрович Пожечевський; born 4 February 1951 in Poltava, USSR) is a Ukrainian professional football player and manager.

== Career ==
He was a footballer of the Silbud Poltava, but by high competition has not played any match.

In 1984, he started his coaching career in FC Vorskla Poltava. In 1998, he coached the Turkmenistan national football team. Also he was a coach of the Köpetdag Aşgabat. Later he coached FC Naftovyk-Ukrnafta Okhtyrka.
