= FC Vorskla-2 Poltava =

Vorksla-2 Poltava
- Full name: Футбольний клуб Ворскла-2 Полтава; Football Club Vorskla-2 Poltava
- Founded: 1997; 29 years ago 2024; 2 years ago
- Ground: Ltava Stadium
- Capacity: 650
- Owner: Eduard Shalayev via Ferrexpo
- Administrators: Roman Cherniak (president); Oleh Lysak (vice-president); Hennadiy Muzyka (vice-president)
- Manager: Vyacheslav Nivinskyi
- League: Ukrainian Second League
- Website: http://vorskla.com.ua/
Home colours	Away colours	Third colours

Vorskla-2 is a Ukrainian football reserve team of FC Vorskla Poltava based in Poltava, Ukraine. Unlike junior squads (U-21 or U-19) that compete in competitions for junior teams, Vorksla-2 competes in lower-level leagues of the national league pyramid structure.

== Brief overview ==
For the first time the Poltava's club was fielding its second team back in 1959 when the direct predecessor of Vorskla, Kolhospnyk, fielded its team in the 1959 Football Championship of the Ukrainian SSR.

In 1984, based on the second team and football academy of Kolos Poltava, there was established FC Vorskla Poltava.

The team has been featured regularly in the Ukrainian Second Division it served as a junior team for the FC Vorskla Poltava franchise in 1997 through 2005. Like most tributary teams, the best players are sent up to the senior team, meanwhile developing other players for further call-ups.

In 2024, the team was revived once again to participate in competitions of the Ukrainian Second League.

== Players ==
=== Current squad ===
As of 5 May 2025

Note: Flags indicate national team as defined under FIFA eligibility rules; some limited exceptions apply. Players may hold more than one non-FIFA nationality.

No.	Pos.	Nation	Player
16	DF	UKR	Valentyn Tkach
16	MF	UKR	Nikita Strilyanyi
19	DF	UKR	Danylo Izotov
26	FW	UKR	Stanislav Prus
31	GK	UKR	Ivan Shyryayev
37	MF	UKR	Zakhar Karpus
43	FW	UKR	Vladyslav Ostrovskyi
47	DF	UKR	Nikita Bahinskyi
48	FW	UKR	Artem Horobets

No.	Pos.	Nation	Player
50	MF	UKR	Nikita Krokhmal
54	MF	UKR	Dmytro Kretsul
55	DF	UKR	Denys Selin
58	MF	UKR	Mykyta Odentsov
61	GK	UKR	Oleksandr Domoleha
62	DF	UKR	Eduard Romanets
71	GK	UKR	Dmytro Yashchenko
86	DF	UKR	Oleksandr Kozintsev
99	FW	UKR	Artem Serdyuk

== Notable players ==
- Andriy Pyatov
- Petro Kondratyuk, all-time leading top scorer
- Oleksandr Bessarab, single season top scorer

== Coaches ==
- 1997–98 Serhiy Sobetskyi
- 1998–01 Ivan Shariy
- 2001–02 Semen Osynovskyi
- 2002–03 Oleh Morhun
- 2003–04 Viktor Nosov
- 2004–05 Oleksandr Omelchuk
- 2024–25
- 2025–present Vyacheslav Nivinskyi
