= Regional championships of Ukraine (football) =

Football competitions in Ukraine

Regional championships of Ukraine (football) are football competitions in Ukraine among amateurs that are organized by regional organizations. All regional football organizations are members of the FFU Council of Regions.

== Members ==
There are 26 members. In each region conducts its on championship, while most of them has the second and the third tiers of league competitions. Each region also conducts a regional cup competitions as well as some additional regional tournaments. Along with it each regional federation has several smaller regional federations of its own (raion and city federations).

Football Federation	Top league	Second level	Auxiliary league	District leagues	Links
Crimea and Sevastopol	none, due to the temporary Russian occupation				
Cherkasy Oblast	First League	Business League			Cherkasy Oblast Football Federation
Chernihiv Oblast	Supreme League	First League			Amateur site
Chernivtsi Oblast	Supreme League	First League	Second leagues		More info Bukovyna Sport-Portal; Chernivtsisport.com
Dnipropetrovsk Oblast	Supreme League	First League		Districts	Dnipropetrovsk Oblast Football Federation; Kryvyi Rih Football Federation
Donetsk Oblast	Donbass League	Oblast League			Donetsk Oblast Football Federation
Ivano-Frankivsk Oblast	First League	Second League		District / City championships	Informational portal Ivano-Frankivsk Oblast Football Federation
Kharkiv Oblast	First League				
Kherson Oblast	Supreme League	First League	Second leagues		Kherson Oblast Football Federation
Khmelnytskyi Oblast	First League				
Kirovohrad Oblast	First Group	Second Group		Districts	Kirovohrad Oblast Football Federation
Kyiv Oblast	First League	Second League		District leagues	Kyiv Oblast Sport-Portal; Kyiv Oblast Football Federation
Luhansk Oblast	Football Championship			unknown	
Lviv Oblast	Premier League	First League	Second leagues	Third League / Districts	Lviv Oblast Football Federation; General info
Mykolaiv Oblast	Supreme League	First League			Mykolaiv Oblast Football Federation
Odesa Oblast					Odesa Football-Portal
Poltava Oblast	Vyshcha Liha	First League		District / City championships	Football Association of Poltava Oblast
Rivne Oblast	First League	Second League			Rivne Oblast Football Federation; Ostroh Raion Football Federation
Sumy Oblast	Championship				Sumy Oblast Football Federation
Ternopil Oblast				Districts	
Vinnytsia Oblast	First League	Second League		Districts	Vinnytsia Oblast Football Federation
Volyn Oblast	Premier League	First League		Districts	Volyn Oblast Football Federation
Zakarpattia Oblast	Premier League	First League		Districts	Zakarpattia Oblast Football Federation
Zaporizhia Oblast					
Zhytomyr Oblast	Championship				Zhytomyr Oblast Football Federation; Football-Portal of Malyn
Kyiv	Premier League	First League	Second leagues	District in city league	Kyiv Football Federation
