= 2009 Ivano-Frankivsk Oblast Second League =

The Second League consisted of 12 participants.

== Participants ==
- FC Karpaty Bolekhiv;
- FC Koloc Pyadyky;
- FC Pidhirya;
- FC Prut Deliatyn;
- FC Karpaty Kuty;
- FC Krona-Karpaty Broshniv-Osada;
- FC Dnister Poberezhia;
- FC Meteor Zhykotyn (newly entered, plays in Korshev);
- FC Yunior Lysets (newly entered, reorganized of Enerhetyk Ivano-Frankivsk 30-years ago);
- FC Neptune Zabolotiv (newly entered, split from FC Pokuttia Sniatyn last year);
- FC Hutsulschyna Kosiv (newly entered from the Oblast Championship 2008);
- FC Yaspil Yaseniv-Pilnyi (newly entered);

Note:

- FC Karpaty Pechenizhyn and FC Cheremosh Verkhovyna did not reapply

== See also ==
- Ivano-Frankivsk Oblast Championship 2009
- Ivano-Frankivsk Oblast FF
