= 2019–20 Football Championship of Vinnytsia Oblast =

Football Championship of Vinnytsia Oblast
- Season: 2019–20
- Champions: FC Tomashpil

The 2019–20 Football Championship of Vinnytsia Oblast was won by FC Tomashpil.

== First League table ==
Pos	Team	Pld	W	D	L	GF	GA	GD	Pts	Qualification or relegation
1	FC Tomashpil (C)	15	9	4	2	31	18	+13	31	Champion
2	Fakel Lypovets	15	6	6	3	33	22	+11	24	
3	FC Orlivka	15	7	2	6	24	16	+8	23	
4	Monolit Koziatyn	15	6	3	6	29	17	+12	21	
5	Avanhard Ladyzhyn	16	2	1	13	13	57	−44	7	

Updated to match(es) played on 9 August 2020. Source: "Турнірна таблиця Чемпіонату області (вища ліга) сезону 2019-2020 рр". Vinnytsia Oblast Association of Football.
(C) Champions
