= Volodymyr Duran =

Ukrainian footballer

Personal information
- Full name: Volodymyr Ivanovych Duran
- Date of birth: 1 November 1998 (age 28)
- Place of birth: Ukraine
- Height: 1.80 m (5 ft 11 in)
- Position: Central midfielder

Youth career
- 2011–2015: SDYuSShOR Uzhhorod
- 2012–2013: → Serednye (loan)

Senior career*
Years	Team	Apps	(Gls)
2016	Serednye	7	(0)
2016	Spartakus Uzhhorod	12	(0)
2017–2022	Uzhhorod	100	(3)
- * Club domestic league appearances and goals as of 18 February 2025

Volodymyr Ivanovych Duran (Ukrainian: Володимир Іванович Дуран; born 1 November 1998) is a Ukrainian professional footballer who plays as a central midfielder.

== Personal life ==
Volodymyr is the son of Ukrainian politician from Zakarpattia Oblast and president of Uzhhorod Ivan Duran.
