= Ivan Duran =

Ivan Duran may refer to:

- Ivan Duran (musician)
- Ivan Duran (politician)
