= Wołyń District League =

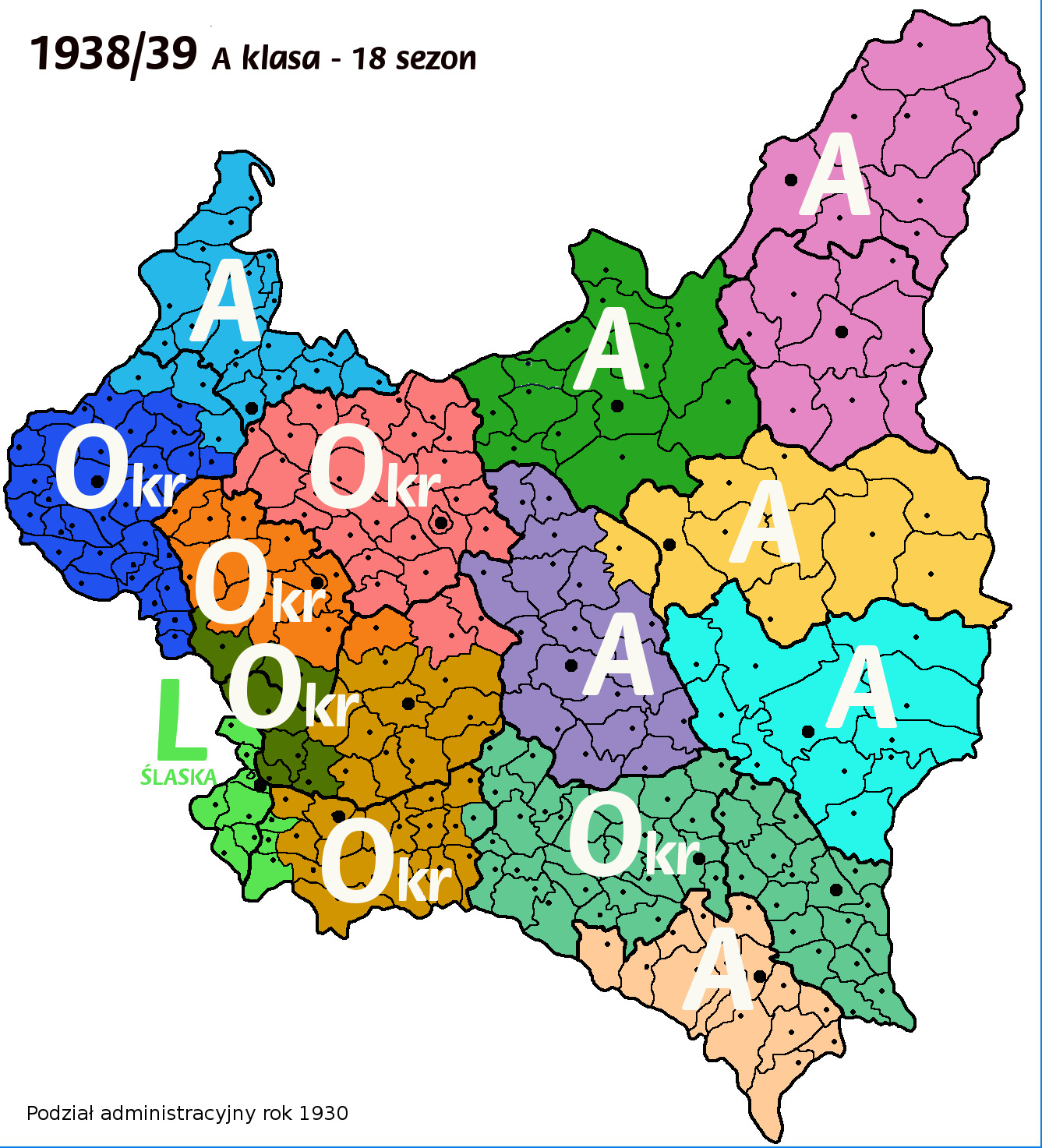
On the map identified in a teal color on the right side

Wołyń District League was a regional association football championship in the Wołyń Voivodeship, Poland (then Second Polish Republic) in 1930–1939.

The league was created in 1930 based on Volhynian competitions that in 1928–29 were under temporary administration of the Lwów District Football Union and teams that since 1922 competed in the Lublin District League.

The competitions were conducted on territory of modern West Ukraine which during the World War II was annexed by the Soviet Union and added to the Soviet Ukraine (Ukrainian Soviet Socialist Republic). The Wołyń District League is considered to be a football precursor of the Volyn Oblast Football Federation and Rivne Oblast Football Federation championships in the modern Ukraine.

Winners of the league qualified to regional play-offs, a winner of which was advancing to the newly formed National League.

== Lwów District League administration ==
Separate football competitions were established in 1928 in Wołyń Voivodeship under administration of the Lwów District Football Union (OZPN) as a separate subgroup out teams that previously competed in the Lublin District League. Hallerczyki Równe, Sokół Równe, WKS Kowel previously competed in the Lublin District League.

Winners of the newly established competitions were not allowed to the promotional play-offs.

Season	Champions	Runners-up	Third place	# teams	Notes
1928	Hallerczyki Równe	Sokół Równe	WKS Kowel	4	
1929	WKS Kowel	Hasmonea Równe	Hallerczyki Równe	5	

== Own administration ==
List of the top tier's winners of the district league

Season	Champions	Runners-up	Third place	# teams	Notes
1930	Sokół Równe	Sokół Kowel	WKS Dubno	6	
1931	Hallerczyki Równe	Hasmonea Równe	WKS Łuck	7	
1932	Hasmonea Równe	PKS Łuck	Hallerczyki Równe	8	relegation/promotion
1933	Hasmonea Równe	PKS Łuck	WKS Łuck	8	relegation/promotion
1934	PKS Łuck	Hallerczyki Równe	Hasmonea Kowel	8	
1935	PKS Łuck	Hasmonea Równe	Pogoń Równe	10	relegation/promotion
1936 (sp)	Hallerczyki Równe	PKS Łuck	Strzelec Janowa Dolina/WKS Łuck	10	relegation/promotion, two groups
1936–37	Strzelec Janowa Dolina	PKS Łuck	Hasmonea Łuck	8	
1937–38	PKS Łuck	Pogoń Równe	Hasmonea Równe	8	relegation/promotion
1938–39	PKS Łuck	WKS Dubno	Hasmonea Równe	8	relegation/promotion

=== Winners ===
- 4 – PKS Łuck
- 3 – Hallerczyki Równe
- 2 – Hasmonea Równe
- 1 – 3 clubs (WKS Kowel, Sokół Równe, Strzelec Janowa Dolina)

== See also ==
- Rivne Oblast Football Federation
- Football Federation of Volyn
