= 2019–20 Football Championship of Volyn Oblast =

Football Championship of Volyn Oblast
- Season: 2019–20
- Champions: Shakhtar Novovolynsk

The 2019–20 Football Championship of Volyn Oblast was won by Shakhtar Novovolynsk.

The season that started on 31 August 2019 was extended and ended on 11 November 2020.

== League table ==
Pos	Team	Pld	W	D	L	GF	GA	GD	Pts
1	Shakhtar Novovolynsk (C)	18	13	2	3	39	18	+21	41
2	LSTM No.536	18	12	4	2	54	27	+27	40
3	Votrans Lutsk	18	12	3	3	59	22	+37	39
4	Kovel-Volyn	18	11	5	2	32	15	+17	38
5	Boratyn	18	8	1	9	33	26	+7	25
6	Nadia Khoriv	18	7	2	9	30	43	−13	23
7	Zaborol	18	7	1	10	36	37	−1	22
8	Rozhyshche	18	3	1	14	30	58	−28	10
9	Feniks Lutsk (Note: Feniks Lutsk was stripped of a point according to regulations.)	18	3	2	13	20	53	−33	10
10	Kolos Ivanychi	18	3	1	14	16	50	−34	10

Source: "ТУРНІРНА ТАБЛИЦЯ". Volyn Association of Football. Archived from the original on 2020-11-17.
(C) Champions
