= 2020 Football Championship of Chernivtsi Oblast =

Football Championship of Chernivtsi Oblast
- Season: 2020
- Champions: Dovbush Chernivtsi

The 2020 Football Championship of Chernivtsi Oblast was won by USC Dovbush Chernivtsi.

== League table ==
Pos	Team	Pld	W	D	L	GF	GA	GD	Pts
1	Dovbush Chernivtsi (C)	18	14	3	1	45	11	+34	45
2	FC Nyzhni Stanivtsi	18	13	3	2	43	20	+23	42
3	FC Chahor	18	11	3	4	46	24	+22	36
4	FC Hlyboka	18	10	1	7	35	27	+8	31
5	TOM studio Chernivtsi	18	8	2	8	25	28	−3	26
6	FC Staryi Vovchynets	18	8	2	8	39	45	−6	26
7	Shkval Chornivka	18	6	2	10	17	28	−11	20
8	FC Nepolokivtsi	18	5	3	10	23	29	−6	18
9	Fazenda Chernivtsi	18	4	1	13	19	52	−33	13
10	Dnister Novodnistrovsk	18	0	2	16	13	40	−27	2

Source: "Переможець Суперліги-2020 – УСК "Довбуш" у рік свого 100-річного ювілею!". Chernivtsi Oblast Association of Football. Archived from the original on 2020-11-17.
(C) Champions
