= 2019 Football Championship of Odesa Oblast =

Football Championship of Odesa Oblast
- Season: 2019
- Champions: imeni V.Z.Tura Dmytrivka

The 2019 Football Championship of Odesa Oblast was won by imeni V.Z.Tura Dmytrivka.

== League table ==
Pos	Team	Pld	W	D	L	GF	GA	GD	Pts
1	imeni V.Z.Tura Dmytrivka (C)	14	12	1	1	52	22	+30	37
2	Khadzhybei Usatove	14	10	1	3	35	17	+18	31
3	Olimp Kirnychky	14	9	2	3	38	9	+29	29
4	Dnistrovets Bilhorod-Dnistrovskyi	14	5	2	7	20	26	−6	17
5	FC Zorya	14	4	3	7	15	24	−9	15
6	SC Izmayil	14	3	2	9	18	32	−14	11
7	FC Chornomorsk	14	2	4	8	17	35	−18	10
8	Lokomotyv Podilsk	14	3	1	10	17	47	−30	10

Source: "Чемпіонат Одеської області 2019". Footboom. Archived from the original on 2020-06-21.
(C) Champions
