= 2020 Football Championship of Khmelnytskyi Oblast =

Football Championship of Khmelnytskyi Oblast
- Season: 2020
- Champions: Ahrobiznes Nova Ushytsia

The 2020 Football Championship of Khmelnytskyi Oblast was won by Ahrobiznes Nova Ushytsia.

== First stage ==
=== Group 1 ===
Pos	Team	Pld	W	D	L	GF	GA	GD	Pts	Qualification or relegation
1	Perlyna Podillia Bilohiria	8	7	0	1	36	13	+23	21	Qualified to Final stage
2	Lisivnyk Shepetivka	8	6	0	2	22	9	+13	18	Qualified to Final stage
3	FC Antoniny	8	3	1	4	20	15	+5	10	
4	Tsukrovyk Starokostiantyniv	8	3	1	4	17	19	−2	10	
5	Iskra Teofipol	8	0	0	8	5	44	−39	0	

Source: "ЧЕМПІОНАТ ХО". Khmelnytskyi Oblast Association of Football. Archived from the original on 2020-11-24.

=== Group 2 ===
Pos	Team	Pld	W	D	L	GF	GA	GD	Pts	Qualification or relegation
1	OTH Stara Syniava	10	7	2	1	31	14	+17	23	Qualified to Final stage
2	Elita Pasichna	10	6	3	1	30	14	+16	21	Qualified to Final stage
3	Sluch Krasyliv	10	6	0	4	28	18	+10	18	
4	Nyva Letychiv	10	4	2	4	24	15	+9	14	
5	Olimp Derazhnia	10	2	1	7	12	22	−10	7	
6	FC Medzhybizh	10	1	0	9	15	57	−42	3	

Source: "ЧЕМПІОНАТ ХО". Khmelnytskyi Oblast Association of Football. Archived from the original on 2020-11-24.

=== Group 3 ===
Pos	Team	Pld	W	D	L	GF	GA	GD	Pts	Qualification or relegation
1	Ahrobiznes Nova Ushytsia	10	8	1	1	27	9	+18	25	Qualified to Final stage
2	LMD-Patrioty Derazhnia	10	6	2	2	36	13	+23	20	Qualified to Final stage
3	Viktoria Horodok	10	5	2	3	21	16	+5	17	
4	Sokil Sokolivka	10	3	3	4	20	17	+3	12	
5	Evelina Yarmolyntsi	10	3	2	5	11	26	−15	11	
6	Kolos-OTH Dunaivtsi	10	0	0	10	11	45	−34	0	

Source: "ЧЕМПІОНАТ ХО". Khmelnytskyi Oblast Association of Football. Archived from the original on 2020-11-24.

== Final stage ==
Pos	Team	Pld	W	D	L	GF	GA	GD	Pts	Qualification or relegation
1	Ahrobiznes Nova Ushytsia (C)	5	3	2	0	13	3	+10	11	Champions
2	OTH Stara Syniava	5	3	1	1	13	8	+5	10	
3	Perlyna Podillia Bilohiria	5	2	3	0	11	7	+4	9	
4	Lisivnyk Shepetivka	5	2	0	3	12	14	−2	6	
5	LMD-Patrioty Derazhnia	5	1	1	3	9	16	−7	4	
6	Elita Pasichna	5	0	1	4	5	15	−10	1	

Source: "ЧЕМПІОНАТ ХО". Khmelnytskyi Oblast Association of Football. Archived from the original on 2020-11-24.
(C) Champions
