= Oleksandr Pasichnyi =

Ukrainian politician

- Олександр Пасічний
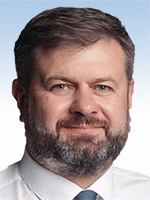
- Official portrait, 2019

People's Deputy of Ukraine
- Incumbent
- Assumed office 29 August 2019
- Preceded by: Borys Kozyr
- Constituency: Mykolaiv Oblast, No. 127

Personal details
- Born: 3 November 1972 (age 53) Mykolaiv, Ukrainian SSR, Soviet Union (now Ukraine)
- Party: Servant of the People
- Other political affiliations: Independent
- Education: Admiral Makarov National University of Shipbuilding

Oleksandr Stanislavovych Pasichnyi (Ukrainian: Олександр Станіславович Пасічний; born 3 November 1972) is a Ukrainian politician and football manager currently serving as a People's Deputy of Ukraine representing Ukraine's 127th electoral district as a member of Servant of the People since 2019. Previously, he worked as a salesman for The Coca-Cola Company and as manager of the Football Federation of Mykolaiv Oblast.

== Early life and career ==
Oleksandr Stanislavovych Pasichnyi was born on 3 November 1972 in the city of Mykolaiv in southern Ukraine. He is a graduate of the Admiral Makarov National University of Shipbuilding, specialising in welding technology and equipment. Prior to his election, Pasichnyi was a salesman for The Coca-Cola Company in Ukraine before becoming a private entrepreneur in 1998. In the latter capacity, he founded IMAGE-2014 and SNB11, both ice cream distribution companies. He was also manager of FC Varvarivka and the Football Federation of Mykolaiv Oblast.

== Political career ==
During the 2019 Ukrainian parliamentary election, Pasichnyi was the candidate of Servant of the People for People's Deputy of Ukraine in Ukraine's 127th electoral district. At the time of the election, he was an independent. He was successfully elected, winning with 38.22% of the vote; incumbent People's Deputy Borys Kozyr, running as an independent, placed third with 9.62% of the vote.

In the Verkhovna Rada (national parliament of Ukraine), Pasichnyi joined the Servant of the People faction, as well as the Verkhovna Rada Budget Committee and the South Ukraine inter-factional association. He was criticised by anti-corruption non-governmental organisation Chesno for his 2022 vote in favour of urban planning reform, which Chesno claimed would place reconstruction of Ukraine following the Russian invasion in the hands of developers, rather than the Ukrainian people.
