= 2019–20 Football Championship of Ivano-Frankivsk Oblast =

Football Championship of Ivano-Frankivsk Oblast
- Season: 2019–20
- Champions: Pokuttia Kolomyia

The 2019–20 Football Championship of Ivano-Frankivsk Oblast was won by Pokuttia Kolomyia.

== First League table ==
Pos	Team	Pld	W	D	L	GF	GA	GD	Pts	Qualification or relegation
1	Pokuttia Kolomyia (C)	18	13	3	2	42	19	+23	42	Champion
2	Naftovyk Dolyna	17	10	3	4	33	21	+12	33	
3	Karpaty Broshniv	18	10	3	5	30	20	+10	33	
4	Prykarpattia-Teplovyk	17	9	3	5	22	22	0	30	
5	FC Turka	17	6	4	7	23	26	−3	22	
6	Beskyd Nadvirna	17	7	1	9	18	23	−5	22	
7	Karpaty-Enerhetyk (X)	18	6	3	9	18	6	+12	21	Withdrew
8	Probiy Horodenka	17	5	3	9	13	25	−12	18	
9	Nika-Vovchynets	17	5	2	10	17	36	−19	17	
10	Vykhor Yamnytsia (X)	18	3	1	14	11	29	−18	10	Withdrew

Updated to match(es) played on 9 August 2020. Source: "Чемпіонат першої ліги 2019/2020". Ivano-Frankivsk Oblast Association of Football.
(C) Champions; (X) Withdrew
