= Yuriy Druchyk =

Ukrainian footballer

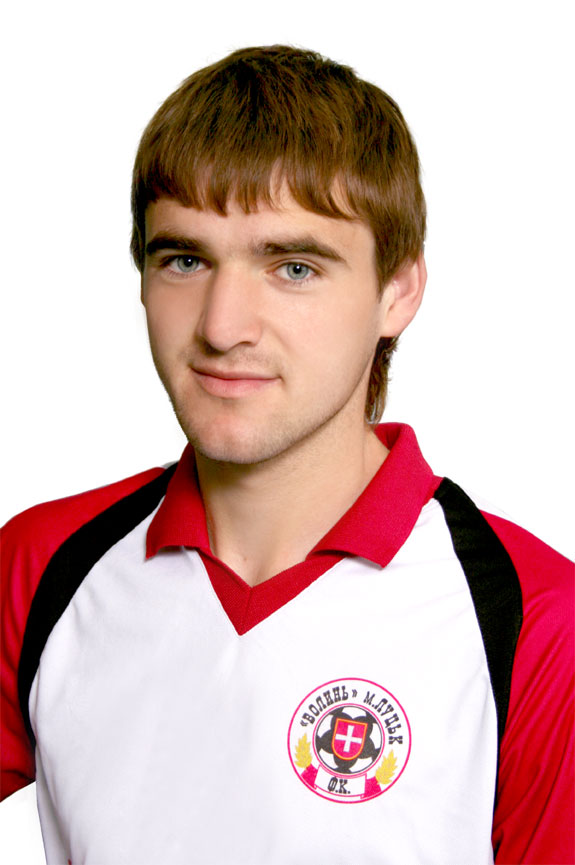

Personal information
- Full name: Yuriy Mykolayovych Druchyk
- Date of birth: 2 February 1987 (age 39)
- Place of birth: Kovel, Volyn Oblast, Ukrainian SSR
- Height: 1.90 m (6 ft 3 in)
- Position: Defender

Youth career
- 2003: Volyn Lutsk
- 2003–2004: MFK Kovel

Senior career*
Years	Team	Apps	(Gls)
2005–2010	Volyn Lutsk	60	(0)
2009	→ Nyva Ternopil	12	(0)
2010	→ Belshina Bobruisk (loan)	13	(1)
2010–2011	Belshina Bobruisk	29	(1)
2012–2013	Dinamo Brest	16	(0)
2014–2020	Kovel-Volyn Kovel		
- * Club domestic league appearances and goals as of 13 February 2014

Yuriy Druchyk (Ukrainian: Юрій Миколайович Дручик; born 2 February 1987) is a Ukrainian former professional football defender who plays in the amateur Volyn Oblast league.

== Career ==
Druchyk began his playing career with FC Volyn Lutsk's double team. Than he played on loan in FC Nyva Ternopil and in FC Belshina Bobruisk in Belarusian Premier League.
