= 2008 Ivano-Frankivsk Oblast Second League =

The Second League consisted of 12 participants.

== Final standings ==
- FC Karpaty Pechenizhyn
- FC Prydnistrovya Tlumach
- FC Karpaty Bolekhiv
- FC Koloc Pyadyky
- FC Pidhirya
- FC Prut Deliatyn
- FC Khutrovyk Tysmenytsia
- FC Karpaty Kuty
- FC Krona-Karpaty Broshniv-Osada
- FC Dnister Poberezhia
- FC Chornohora-Nika Ivano-Frankivsk
- FC Cheremosh Verkhovyna

== See also ==
- 2008 Ivano-Frankivsk Oblast Championship
- Ivano-Frankivsk Oblast FF
