= 2019 Football Championship of Chernivtsi Oblast =

Football Championship of Chernivtsi Oblast
- Season: 2019
- Champions: FC Voloka

The 2019 Football Championship of Chernivtsi Oblast was won by FC Voloka.

== League table ==
Pos	Team	Pld	W	D	L	GF	GA	GD	Pts
1	FC Voloka (C)	18	15	3	0	78	17	+61	48
2	FC Nepolokivtsi	18	13	3	2	47	15	+32	42
3	Shkval Chornivka	18	11	2	5	40	27	+13	35
4	Dnister Novodnistrovsk	18	10	1	7	45	28	+17	31
5	FC Mahala	18	9	3	6	33	26	+7	30
6	Zolotyi Kolos Stroyintsi	18	8	3	7	34	32	+2	27
7	FC Nyzhni Stanivtsi	18	5	3	10	17	38	−21	18
8	Universytet Chernivtsi	18	4	1	13	22	50	−28	13
9	RA-DENT Chernivtsi	18	4	0	14	15	46	−31	12
10	FC Novoselytsia-2017	18	1	1	16	12	64	−52	4

Source: "Чемпіонат Чернівецької області 2019". Footboom. Archived from the original on 2020-06-18.
(C) Champions
