= Lublin District League =

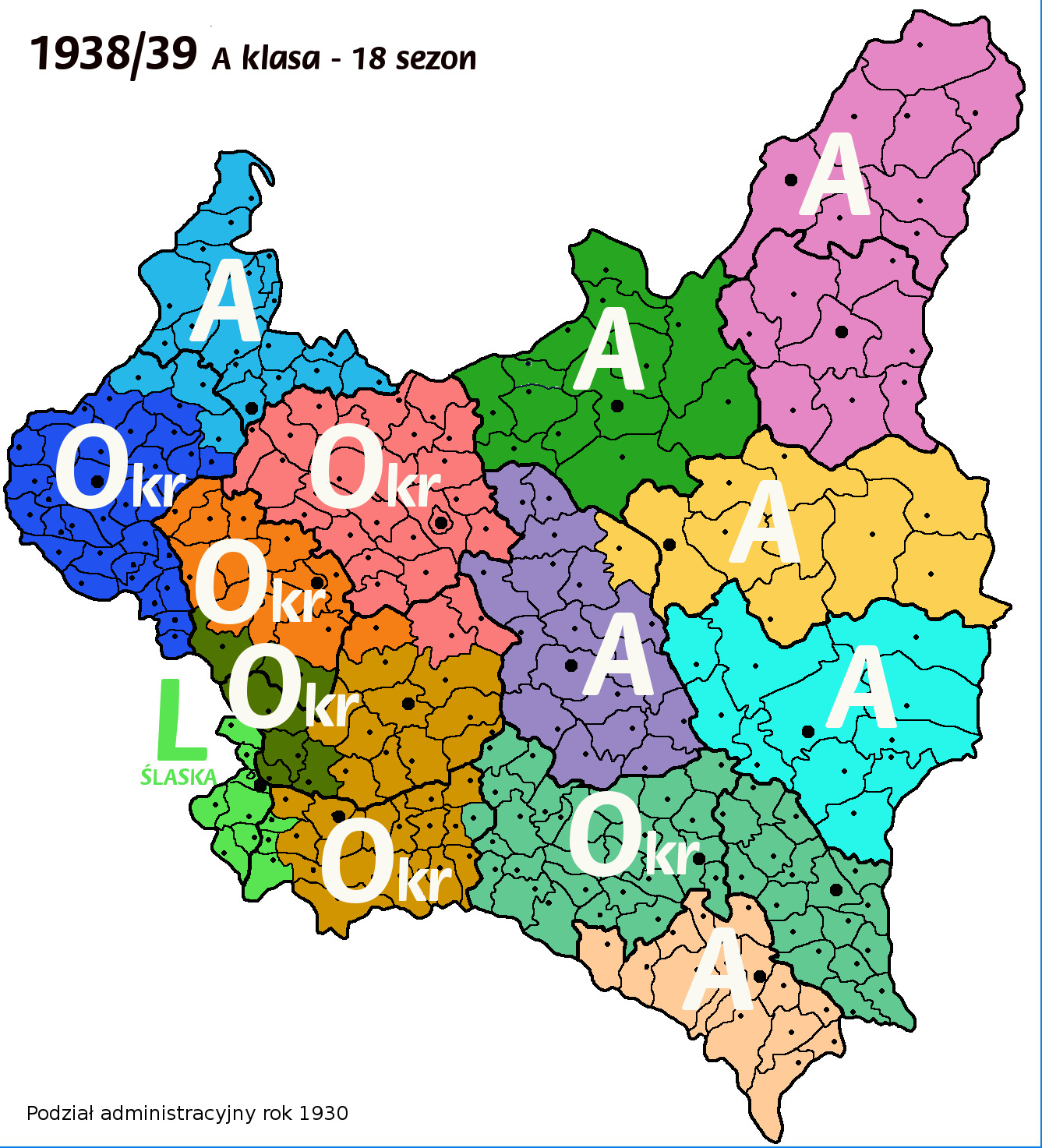
On the map identified in a violet color on the right side

Lublin District League was a regional association football championship in Lublin Voivodeship, Poland (then Second Polish Republic) in 1922–1939.

The league was created in 1922. Following 1927, the Wołyń District League was created and after 1928, Kielce District League was created. After 1929, the district split again and Polesie District League was formed.

The competitions were previously conducted on territory that is now part of three countries Poland, Belarus, and Ukraine.

Winners of the league qualified to regional play-offs and the winner then advanced to the newly formed National League.

== League's laureates ==
List of the top tier's winners of the district league

Season	Champions	Runners-up	Third place	# teams	Notes
1922	WKS Lublin	Hallerczyki Równe	WKS Chełm	4	
1923	WKS Lublin	WKS Chełm	WKS Kresy Brześć	4	
1924	Lublinianka Lublin	WKS Kowel	WKS Lublin	5	
1925					
1926	Lublinianka Lublin	Hallerczyki Równe	WKS Lublin	6	
1927	Unia Lublin	AZS Lublin	Sokół Równe	7	
1928	22 PP Siedlce	9 PAC Siedlce	Unia Lublin	9	
1929	9 PAC Siedlce	22 PP Siedlce	Unia Lublin	6	
1930	Unia Lublin	22 PP Siedlce	9 PAC Siedlce	6	
1931	22 PP Siedlce	9 PAC Siedlce	Unia Lublin	6	
1932	Unia Lublin	AZS Lublin	7 PP Chełm	4	Group Lublin
1932	9 PAC Siedlce	22 PP Siedlce II	Strzelec Siedlce	4	Group Siedlce
1933	Unia Lublin	AZS Lublin	7 PP Chełm	4	Group Lublin
1933	Strzelec Siedlce	9 PAC Siedlce	22 PP Siedlce II	3	Group Siedlce
1934	7 PP LEG Chełm	Unia Lublin	22 PP Strzelec Siedlce II	6	
1935	22 pp Strzelec Siedlce	WKS Dęblin	7 PP LEG Chełm	7	
1936 (sp)	Unia Lublin	LWS Lublin	7 PP Chełm	7	
1936–37	Unia Lublin	LWS Lublin	Hetman Zamość	6	
1937–38	Unia Lublin	LWS Lublin	7 PP Chełm	6	
1938–39	Unia Lublin	LWS Lublin	LOT Dęblin	5	

=== Winners ===
- 9 – Unia Lublin (including Lublinianka Lublin)
- 3 – 22 PP Siedlce (including 22 PP Strzelec Siedlce)
- 2 – WKS Lublin
- 1 – 9 PAC Siedlce
- 1 – Strzelec Siedlce
- 1 – 7 PP LEG Chełm

== See also ==
- IV liga Lublin
