= Regional football associations of Ukraine =

The Regional football associations in Ukraine (Note: Between 1992 and 2019, regional football organizations as well as the national Football Federation of Ukraine were called "federations". This naming followed the Soviet tradition. In 2019, the terminology was changed to align with the common European practice.) are sports organizations in regions of Ukraine (oblasts and other territories) with membership in the Ukrainian Association of Football.

In 2000, the Football Federation of Ukraine created the Council of Regions for the development of football in the regions throughout the country. It was dissolved in 2010. Later, it was redesigned as the Assembly of the UAF regions.

== Description ==
There are 24 active members, while the membership of the other 3 associations in occupied territories is suspended due to the 2014 Russian invasion of Ukraine. As of 2025, due to open hostilities by the Russian Federation, only 20 regions carry out their own competitions.

Each region conducts its own championship (top round-robin tournament), while most of them also host the second and third tiers of league competitions. Each region also conducts a regional cup competition (single elimination tournaments) as well as some additional regional tournaments. Along with it, each regional association has several smaller regional associations of its own (raion and city associations). Note that the Sevastopol City Football Federation cooperates with the Crimean Republican Football Federation and often teams from Sevastopol compete in the championship of the peninsula.

Due to the 2014 Russian invasion of Ukraine, several regions were forced to suspend all sports competition due to war conditions. Following the occupation and annexation of Crimea, the local Republican Crimean Football Federation was taken over by the Russian authorities and, under the UEFA Special Commission mediation, transferred to the Russian Football Union. Later, it was renamed the Crimean Football Union. In 2016 Football Federation of Ukraine revived its own Football Federation of Crimea in Kherson.

Following the occupation of the Eastern Ukraine by the Russian Armed Forces in 2014-2015 under pretense of a separatist movement, football competitions in Luhansk Oblast and Donetsk Oblast were conducted under the auspices of the pro-Russian administration (Luhansk People's Republic, Donetsk People's Republic), while in non-occupied territories of the same regions local competitions were resumed in a smaller scale.

Football Association	Year	Office	Members	Competitions	Links
Autonomous Republic of Crimea/Sevastopol	1993/1995	x	15+10/0+18		Republican FFK / Tavria fan's website
Cherkasy Oblast	1991/1997	Cherkasy	26+7	1954	FFCHO
Chernihiv Oblast	1999	Chernihiv	15+22	1947	CNOFF
Chernivtsi Oblast	1997	Chernivtsi	13+12	1941/1945	FFBUK; Bukovyna Sport-Portal
Dnipropetrovsk Oblast	1993	Dnipro	34+11		FFDO
Donetsk Oblast	1994	Sloviansk	39+55		suspended
Ivano-Frankivsk Oblast	1991	Ivano-Frankivsk	19+13		IFFF
Kharkiv Oblast	1993	Kharkiv	24+8		HOFF
Kherson Oblast	1996	Kherson	15+11		HOFF (new); Kherson Oblast Football Federation (old)
Khmelnytskyi Oblast	1998	Khmelnytskyi	26+6		no website
Kirovohrad Oblast	1995	Kropyvnytskyi	24+9		KOFF-FFU
Kyiv Oblast/Kyiv	1997	Kyiv	39+6/0+74		KOFF/FFK
Luhansk Oblast	1990	Severodonetsk	9+9		suspended
Lviv Oblast	1990	Lviv	26+15		DUFLL
Mykolaiv Oblast	1994	Mykolaiv	24+6		FFMO
Odesa Oblast	1991	Odesa	18+12		OOFA; Odesa Football Portal
Poltava Oblast	1998	Poltava	19+6		FFPO
Rivne Oblast		Rivne	20+34		ROFF
Sumy Oblast	1992	Sumy	16+11		FFSumy
Ternopil Oblast	1991	Ternopil	18+17		TOFF
Vinnytsia Oblast	1992	Vinnytsia	22+8		VOFF
Volyn Oblast	1997	Lutsk	20+16		FFV
Zakarpattia Oblast	1997	Mukacheve	16+10		FFZ
Zaporizhzhia Oblast	1999	Zaporizhzhia	10+16		ZOFF
Zhytomyr Oblast	1992	Zhytomyr	13+7		ZHOFF

== See also ==
- Ukrainian Association of Football
- AAFU
- Regional championships of Ukraine (football)
