= 2019 Football Championship of Zakarpattia Oblast =

Football Championship of Zakarpattia Oblast
- Season: 2019
- Champions: Sevliush Vynohradiv

The 2019 Football Championship of Zakarpattia Oblast was won by Sevliush Vynohradiv.

== League table ==
Pos	Team	Pld	W	D	L	GF	GA	GD	Pts
1	Sevliush Vynohradiv (C)	21	15	5	1	65	22	+43	50
2	FC Poliana	21	12	5	4	52	25	+27	41
3	Vytiaz Kontsovo	21	10	3	8	39	37	+2	33
4	FC Vilkhivtsi	21	11	0	10	40	39	+1	33
5	Munkach Mukachevo	21	9	5	7	34	24	+10	32
6	Karpaty Rakhiv	21	7	6	8	29	36	−7	27
7	FC Serednie	21	4	2	15	22	47	−25	14
8	Buzhora Irshava	21	1	4	16	13	64	−51	7

Source: "Вища ліга". Football Federation of Zakarpattia. Archived from the original on 2020-06-16.
(C) Champions
