= 2019 Football Championship of Mykolaiv Oblast =

Football Championship of Mykolaiv Oblast
- Season: 2019
- Champions: Varvarivka Mykolaiv

The 2019 Football Championship of Mykolaiv Oblast was won by Varvarivka Mykolaiv.

MFC Pervomaisk competed parallelly in the 2018–19 Ukrainian Football Amateur League and the 2019–20 Ukrainian Football Amateur League.

== First stage ==
=== Group North ===
| Pos | Team | Pld | W | D | L | GF | GA | GD | Pts |
|---|---|---|---|---|---|---|---|---|---|
| 1 | MFC Pervomaisk (A) | 6 | 6 | 0 | 0 | 33 | 10 | +23 | 18 |
| 2 | Sokil Voznesensk (A) | 6 | 3 | 1 | 2 | 12 | 16 | −4 | 10 |
| 3 | FC Semenivka | 6 | 1 | 1 | 4 | 7 | 16 | −9 | 4 |
| 4 | FC Mostove | 6 | 0 | 2 | 4 | 6 | 16 | −10 | 2 |

Source: "Чемпионат Николаевской области 2019 Высшая лига Группа «Север»". Footballfacts.ru.
(A) Advanced to the next stage

=== Group Center ===
| Pos | Team | Pld | W | D | L | GF | GA | GD | Pts |
|---|---|---|---|---|---|---|---|---|---|
| 1 | FC Voronivka (A) | 6 | 4 | 0 | 2 | 28 | 11 | +17 | 12 |
| 2 | FC Domanivka (A) | 6 | 4 | 0 | 2 | 26 | 20 | +6 | 12 |
| 3 | FC Ahrarnyk Veselynove | 6 | 2 | 1 | 3 | 13 | 21 | −8 | 7 |
| 4 | FC Zori nad Buhom Yasterbynove | 6 | 1 | 1 | 4 | 13 | 28 | −15 | 4 |

Source: "Чемпионат Николаевской области 2019 Высшая лига Группа «Центр»". Footballfacts.ru.
(A) Advanced to the next stage

=== Group South ===
| Pos | Team | Pld | W | D | L | GF | GA | GD | Pts |
|---|---|---|---|---|---|---|---|---|---|
| 1 | Varvarivka Mykolaiv (A) | 6 | 6 | 0 | 0 | 40 | 8 | +32 | 18 |
| 2 | Ahrolider Snihurivka (A) | 6 | 4 | 0 | 2 | 13 | 6 | +7 | 12 |
| 3 | Radsad Veselyi Sad | 6 | 1 | 1 | 4 | 8 | 24 | −16 | 4 |
| 4 | Ukr-Nyva-Brazil Berezanka | 6 | 0 | 1 | 5 | 10 | 33 | −23 | 1 |

Source: "Чемпионат Николаевской области 2019 Высшая лига Группа «Юг»". Footballfacts.ru.
(A) Advanced to the next stage

=== Group East ===
| Pos | Team | Pld | W | D | L | GF | GA | GD | Pts |
|---|---|---|---|---|---|---|---|---|---|
| 1 | FC Novyi Buh - Kamiane (A) | 6 | 5 | 1 | 0 | 13 | 2 | +11 | 16 |
| 2 | FC AgriGrein (A) | 6 | 3 | 0 | 3 | 15 | 11 | +4 | 9 |
| 3 | FC Kazanka | 6 | 2 | 1 | 3 | 8 | 10 | −2 | 7 |
| 4 | FC Olhopol | 6 | 1 | 0 | 5 | 5 | 18 | −13 | 3 |

Source: "Чемпионат Николаевской области 2019 Высшая лига Группа «Восток»". Footballfacts.ru.
(A) Advanced to the next stage

== Second stage ==
| Pos | Team | Pld | W | D | L | GF | GA | GD | Pts |
|---|---|---|---|---|---|---|---|---|---|
| 1 | Varvarivka Mykolaiv (C) | 14 | 12 | 1 | 1 | 55 | 14 | +41 | 37 |
| 2 | FC Voronivka | 14 | 10 | 2 | 2 | 40 | 22 | +18 | 32 |
| 3 | FC Novyi Buh - Kamiane | 12 | 8 | 1 | 3 | 23 | 9 | +14 | 25 |
| 4 | MFC Pervomaisk | 12 | 7 | 2 | 3 | 41 | 21 | +20 | 23 |
| 5 | Ahrolider Snihurivka | 14 | 5 | 3 | 6 | 23 | 23 | 0 | 18 |
| 6 | AgriGrein | 14 | 3 | 0 | 11 | 22 | 51 | −29 | 9 |
| 7 | FC Domanivka (W) | 14 | 2 | 3 | 9 | 11 | 38 | −27 | 9 |
| 8 | Sokil Voznesensk | 14 | 0 | 2 | 12 | 13 | 50 | −37 | 2 |

Source: "Чемпіонат Миколаївської області 2019". Footboom. Archived from the original on 2020-06-21.
(C) Champions; (W) Withdrew
