= 2019 Football Championship of Rivne Oblast =

Football Championship of Rivne Oblast
- Season: 2019
- Champions: FC Malynsk

The 2019 Football Championship of Rivne Oblast was won by FC Malynsk.

== League table ==
Pos	Team	Pld	W	D	L	GF	GA	GD	Pts
1	FC Malynsk (C)	20	18	1	1	96	12	+84	55
2	Maiak Sarny	20	15	2	3	65	16	+49	47
3	FC Rafalivka	20	12	2	6	53	29	+24	38
4	FC Sadove	20	10	3	7	40	29	+11	33
5	Ikva Mlyniv	20	8	2	10	22	43	−21	26
6	Kolyvan Klevan	20	7	4	9	24	33	−9	25
7	Sokil Radyvyliv	20	7	2	11	20	46	−26	23
8	Kalyna Buhryn	20	6	4	10	24	38	−14	22
9	Hoshcha-RITTER	20	6	4	10	17	42	−25	22
10	Izotop-RAES Varash	20	6	2	12	38	59	−21	20
11	Lokomotyv Zdolbuniv	20	0	4	16	16	68	−52	4

Source: "Чемпіонат Рівненської області 2019". Footboom. Archived from the original on 2019-07-18.
(C) Champions
