= 2019 Football Championship of Ternopil Oblast =

2019 Football Championship

Football Championship of Ternopil Oblast
- Season: 2019
- Champions: Ahron-OTH Velyki Haï

The 2019 Football Championship of Ternopil Oblast was won by Ahron-OTH Velyki Haï.

== League table ==
Pos	Team	Pld	W	D	L	GF	GA	GD	Pts
1	Ahron-OTH Velyki Haï (C)	14	9	5	0	29	8	+21	32
2	Nyva Terebovlia	14	7	5	2	25	14	+11	26
3	Ahronyva-TNPU Ternopil	14	7	4	3	28	15	+13	25
4	Zbruch-Ahrobiznes Pidvolochysk	14	6	4	4	28	21	+7	22
5	Krystal Chortkiv	14	6	3	5	22	17	+5	21
6	FC Berezhany	14	2	6	6	16	26	−10	12
7	FC Kopychyntsi	14	3	2	9	12	28	−16	11
8	DYuSSh-Ternopil	14	1	1	12	12	43	−31	4

Source: "Вища ліга". Ternopilshchyna Association of Football. Archived from the original on 2019-07-17.
(C) Champions
