= 2019 Football Championship of Khmelnytskyi Oblast =

Football Championship of Khmelnytskyi Oblast
- Season: 2019
- Champions: Epitsentr Dunayivtsi

The 2019 Football Championship of Khmelnytskyi Oblast was won by Epitsentr Dunayivtsi.

== League table ==
Pos	Team	Pld	W	D	L	GF	GA	GD	Pts
1	Epitsentr Dunayivtsi (C)	15	13	2	0	56	6	+50	41
2	Sluch Krasyliv	15	10	3	2	45	18	+27	33
3	Sluch Starokostiantyniv	15	8	2	5	33	17	+16	26
4	Iskra Teofipol	15	5	1	9	25	24	+1	16
5	SC Khmelnytskyi	15	3	2	10	17	55	−38	11
6	Fortetsiya Kamianets-Podilskyi	15	0	2	13	7	63	−56	2

Source: "Чемпіонат Хмельницької області 2019". Footboom. Archived from the original on 2020-06-20.
(C) Champions
- SC Khmelnytskyi played in the 2018–19 Ukrainian Football Amateur League.
- FC Epitsentr Dunayivtsi played in the 2019–20 Ukrainian Football Amateur League.
