= 2009 Ivano-Frankivsk Oblast Championship =

The 2009 Ivan-Frankivsk Oblast Championship consisted of two leagues. The First League contained 16 participating teams, the Second League contained 12.

FC Karpaty Yaremche won the First League, and FC Yuniory Lysets won the Second League.

== Participants ==
- FC Karpaty Yaremche
- FC Delta Hvizdets
- FC Teplovyk Ivano-Frankivsk
- FC Halychyna Halych
- FC Beskyd Nadvirna
- FC Tuzhyliv
- FC Kniahynyn Pidhaytsi
- FC Sokil Uhryniv
- FC Probiy Horodenka
- FC Hazovyk Bohorodchany
- FC Kalush
- FC Spartak Sniatyn
- FC Chornohora-Nika Ivano-Frankivsk (newly entered, Second League 2008)
- FC Prydnistrovya Tlumach (newly entered, Second League 2008 runner-up)
- FC Khutrovyk Tysmenytsia (newly entered, Second League 2008)
- FC Naftovyk Dolyna (newly entered, relegated from the Ukrainian Second League)

Note:

- FC Cementnyk Yamnytsia withdrew after 2008 championship
- FC Prykarpattia-2 Ivano-Frankivsk was taken out of competition upon conclusion of 2008 championship
- FC Hutsulschyna Kosiv withdrew to the Oblast Second League
- FC Kolomyia never reapplied
- FC Pokuttia-Neptune Sniatyn was renamed into Spartak once FC Neptune Zabolotiv reentered the Oblast Second League once again
- FC Enerhetyk-Halychyna-2 Halych became simply FC Halychyna Halych

== See also ==
- Ivano-Frankivsk Oblast Second League 2009
- Ivano-Frankivsk Oblast FF
