= Football Association of Ternopil Oblast =

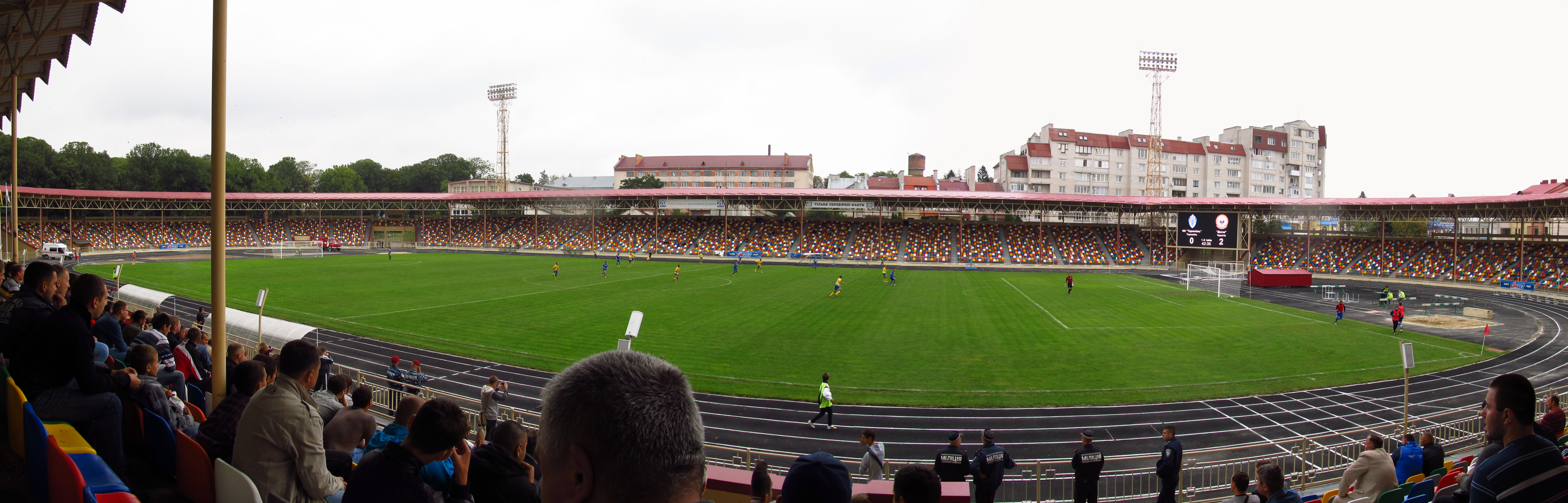
Ternopilsky Misky Stadion is the main football arena in the region

Football Association of Ternopil Oblast is a football governing body in the region of Ternopil Oblast, Ukraine. The association is a member of the Ukrainian Association of Football.

== Presidents ==
- ????–???? Volodymyr Proshkin
- 1991–1995 Volodymyr Avramenko
- 1995–???? Viktor Veres
- ????–???? Viktor Lytvynchuk
- 2001–???? Volodymyr Marynovskyi

== Previous Champions ==
- 1947 Lokomotyv Ternopil (1)
- 1948 Spartak Terebovlya (1)
- 1949 Lokomotyv Ternopil (2)
- 1950 Spartak Terebovlya (2)
- 1951 Shakhtar Kremenets (1)
- 1952 Lokomotyv Ternopil (3)
- 1953 ????
- 1954 ????
- 1955 Chortkiv (1)
- 1956 Dynamo Ternopil (1)
- 1957 Dynamo Ternopil (2)
- 1958 ATP Ternopil (1)
- 1959 Chortkiv (2)
- 1960 Motor Ternopil (1)
- 1961 Burevisnyk Kremenets (1)
- 1962 Burevisnyk Kremenets (2)
- 1963 Kolhospnyk Berezhany (1)
- 1964 Druzhba Chortkiv (1)
- 1965 Kolhospnyk Berezhany (2)
- 1966 Kolhospnyk Buchach (1)
- 1967 Kolhospnyk Buchach (2)
- 1968 Kolhospnyk Buchach (3)
- 1969 Kolos Buchach (4)
- 1970 Kolos Buchach (5)
- 1971 Kolos Buchach (6)
- 1972 Kolos Buchach (7)
- 1973 Kolos Buchach (8)
- 1974 Dnister Zalishchyky (1)
- 1975 Kombainobudivnyk Ternopil (1)
- 1976 Budivelnyk Monastyryska (1)
- 1977 Vatra Ternopil (1)
- 1978 Kombainobudivnyk Ternopil (2)
- 1979 Kombainobudivnyk Ternopil (3)
- 1980 Nyva Pidhaitsi (1)
- 1981 Vatra Ternopil (2)
- 1982 Zoria Khorostkiv (1)
- 1983 Vatra Ternopil (3)
- 1984 Avtomobilist Kopychyntsi (1)
- 1985 Dnister Zalishchyky (2)
- 1986 Nyva Berezhany (2)
- 1987 Nyva Berezhany (3)
- 1988 Nyva Berezhany (4)
- 1989 Tsukrovyk Chortkiv (1)
- 1990 Dnister Zalishchyky (3)
- 1991 Kolos Novosilka (1)
- =independence of Ukraine=
- 1992 Kolos Monastyryska (1)
- 1992-93 Kolos Monastyryska (2)
- 1993-94 Kolos Zboriv (1)
- 1994-95 Nyva Terebovlya (1)
- 1995-96 Zoria Khorostkiv (2)
- 1996-97 Zoria Khorostkiv (3)
- 1997-98 Zoria Khorostkiv (4)
- 1998-99 Sokil Velyki Hayi (1)
- 1999 Sokil Velyki Hayi (2)
- 2000 Lysonya Berezhany (5)
- 2001 Lysonya Berezhany (6)
- 2002 Avianosets Chortkiv (1)
- 2003 Avianosets Chortkiv (2)
- 2004 Dnister Zalishchyky (4)
- 2005 Brovar Mykulyntsi (1)
- 2006 Brovar Mykulyntsi (2)
- 2007 Ternopil-Burevisnyk (1)
- 2008 Halych Zbarazh (1)
- 2009 FC Ternopil (2)
- 2010 FC Ternopil (3)
- 2011 Ternopil-Peduniversytet (4)
- 2012 FC Berezhany (7)
- 2013 FC Chortkiv (2)
- =Russo-Ukrainian War=
- 2014 Nyva Terebovlya (2)
- 2015 Nyva Terebovlya (3)
- 2016 Nyva Terebovlya (4)
- 2017 Ahron-OTH Velyki Hayi (1)
- 2018 Ahron-OTH Velyki Hayi (2)
- 2019 Ahron-OTH Velyki Hayi (3)
- 2020 Nyva Terebovlya (5)
- 2021 Ahron-OTH Velyki Hayi (4)
- =full-scale Russian invasion=
- 2022 Ahron-OTH Velyki Hayi (5)
- 2023 Ahron-OTH Velyki Hayi (6)
- 2024 Ahron-OTH Velyki Hayi (7)

=== Top winners ===
- 8 – Kolos (Kolhospnyk) Buchach
- 7 – 2 clubs (Lysonya (Nyva) Berezhany, Ahron-OTH Velyki Hayi)
- 5 – Nyva Terebovlya
- 4 – 3 clubs (Dnister, Zoria, Ternopil)
- 3 – 3 clubs (Lokomotyv, Kombainobudivnyk, Vatra)
- 2 – 10 clubs
- 1 – 9 clubs

== Professional clubs ==
- FC Stroitel Ternopil (Avagard), 1959–1974 (16 seasons)
- FC Nyva Ternopil (Berezhany), 1983– (43 seasons)
  - Nyva-2, 2024– (a season)

- FC Dnister Zalishchyky, 1992–1995 (4 seasons)
- FC Sokil Berezhany (Lysonia), 1992–1993, 2005–2006 (3 seasons)
- FC Krystal Chortkiv, 1992–1999 (8 seasons)
- FC Ternopil (Ternopil-Nyva-2), 2000–2002, 2012–2017 (7 seasons)

== Other clubs at national/republican level ==
Note: the list includes clubs that played at republican competitions before 1959 and the amateur or KFK competitions after 1964.

- Lokomotyv Ternopil, 1946–1950
- Bilshovyk Kremenets, 1948
- Dynamo Ternopil, 1952–1957
- Avanhard Ternopil, 1958
- Chortkiv, 1959
- Druzhba Chortkiv, 1964
- Kolhospnyk Berezhany, 1965
- Kolos Buchach, 1966 – 1973
- Mayak Berezhany, 1969
- Avtomobilist Kopychentsi, 1974, 1985
- Dnister Zalishchyky, 1975, 1976, 1986, 1991, 2024/25
- Burevisnyk Ternopil, 1975 – 1978
- Kombainobudivnyk Ternopil, 1976, 1977, 1981
- Budivelnyk Monastyryska, 1977
- Elektron Zbarazh, 1978, 1979
- Vatra Ternopil, 1978 – 1980, 1982, 1983
- Nyva Berezhany/Pidhaitsi, 1979 – 1982
- Sokil Berezhany/Pidhaitsi, 1984 – 1991, 1993/94, 2001, 2002, 2004, 2005, 2007, 2008
- Zoria Khorostkiv, 1980, 1981, 1992/93 – 1997/98
- Halych Zbarazh (Druzhba), 1981, 1984, 2024/25
- Krystal Chortkiv, 1986 – 1991, 2016/17 – 2018/19
- Kolos Zboriv, 1990, 1991
- Zbruch Borshchiv, 1991
- Start Kozova, 1992/93
- Medobory Husiatyn, 1992/93
- Nyva Terebovlia, 1997/98, 2016/17, 2017/18, 2019/20 – 2021/22
- Sokil Velyki Hayi, 1999, 2000
- FC Ternopil, 2010, 2012, 2018/19
- Topilche Ternopil, 2010
- Nyva Ternopil, 2016, 2016/17
- Ahron Velyki Hayi, 2018/19 – 2024/25
- Podoliany Ternopil, 2023/24

== See also ==
- FFU Council of Regions
