= FC Kovel-Volyn Kovel =

Ukrainian football club

Football Center Kovel-Volyn Kovel is a Ukrainian football team based in Kovel, Ukraine. The club used to play in the Ukrainian Second Division and also served as a reserve team for the FC Volyn Lutsk franchise.

The club was established in 1986 as Silmash Kovel.

The club fields senior, junior and female teams.

== Honours ==
- Football Federation of Volyn
  - Winners (8): 1995, 2003, 2004, 2005, 2008, 2009, 2010, 2013
  - Runners-up (1): 2011
- Volyn Cup
  - Winners (2): 2011, 2018
