= Zakarpattia Football Association =

Zakarpattia Football Association is a football governing body in the region of Zakarpattia Oblast, Ukraine. The association is a member of the Regional Council of UAF and the collective member of the UAF itself.

== Presidents ==
- 1945–???? Ivan Bachynskyi
- 1955–???? Petro Kraynianytsia
- 1970s Dezső Tóth (non-Hungarian full name format)
- 1977–1983 Mykhaylo Mykhalyna
- ????–???? ?
- 1991–1995 Mykhaylo Mykhalyna
- 1995–2005 Andriy Havashi
- 2006–2015 Mykhailo Lanyo
- 2015–???? Ivan Duran
- ????–present?

== Previous Champions ==
- 1945 Spartak Uzhhorod (1)
- 1946 Dynamo Mukacheve (1)
- 1947 Dynamo Mukacheve (2)
- 1948 Dynamo Mukacheve (3)
- 1949 Dynamo Mukacheve (4)
- 1950 Dynamo Mukacheve (5)
- 1951 Dynamo Mukacheve (6)
- 1952 Chervona Zirka Chynadiyovo (1)
- 1953 sp Spartak Uzhhorod (2)
- 1953 fa Misktorh Mukacheve (1)
- 1954 Iskra Vynohradiv (1)
- 1955 sp Chervona Zirka Bushtyno (1)
- 1955 fa Burevisnyk Vynohradiv (1)
- 1956 Chervona Zirka Uzhhorod (1)
- 1957 Burevisnyk Solotvyno (1)
- 1958 Avanhard Dovhe (1)
- 1959 Avanhard Khust (1)
- 1960 Avanhard Khust (2)
- 1961 Kolhospnyk Berehove (1)
- 1962 Pryladyst Mukacheve (1)
- 1963 Chervona Zirka Uzhhorod (2)
- 1964 Avanhard Khust (3)
- 1965 Avanhard Khust (4)
- 1966 Kolhospnyk Storozhnytsia (1)
- 1967 Khimik Perechyn (1)
- 1968 Meblevyk Khust (1)
- 1969 Kooperator Berehove (2)
- 1970 Latorytsia Mukacheve (1)
- 1971 Latorytsia Mukacheve (2)
- 1972 Shakhtar Ilnytsia (1)
- 1973 Derevoobrobnyk Vylok (1)
- 1974 Plastmasovyk Vynohradiv (1)
- 1975 Radvanka Uzhhorod (1)
- 1976 Plastmasovyk Vynohradiv (2)
- 1977 Urozhai Kolchyno (1)
- 1978 Karpaty Bushtyno (1)
- 1979 Urozhai Kolchyno (2)
- 1980 Kolos Nove Davydkovo (1)
- 1981 Kolos Nove Davydkovo (2)
- 1982 Kooperator Khust (1)
- 1983 Avanhard Svalyava (1)
- 1984 Keramik Vynohradiv (1)
- 1985 Kolos Zastavne (1)
- 1986 Kolos Vyshkovo (1)
- 1987 Kooperator Khust (2)
- 1988 Keramik Vynohradiv (2)
- 1989 Keramik Vynohradiv (3)
- 1990 Keramik Vynohradiv (4)
- 1991 Tysa Petrovo (1)
- =independence of Ukraine=
- 1992 Aval Dovhe (1)
- 1993 sp Skala Kolchyno (1)
- 1993-94 Aval Dovhe (2)
- 1994-95 Buzhora Irshava (1)
- 1995-96 Karpaty Rakhiv (1)
- 1996-97 Vizhybu Berehove (3)
- 1997-98 Linet Berehove (4)
- 1998 fa Linet Berehove (5)
- 1999 SKA-Palanok Mukacheve (1)
- 2000 SC Perechyn (1)
- 2001 Avanhard Svalyava (2)
- 2002 Avanhard Svalyava (3)
- 2003 Avanhard Svalyava (4)
- 2004 Avanhard Svalyava (5)
- 2005 Avanhard Svalyava (6)
- 2006 Avanhard Svalyava (7)
- 2007 FC Mukacheve (2)
- 2008 FC Mukacheve (3)
- 2009 Beregvidek Berehove (6)
- 2010 Beregvidek Berehove (7)
- 2011 Beregvidek Berehove (8)
- 2012 FC Mukacheve (4)
- 2013 Meteor Pistryalovo (1)
- =Russo-Ukrainian War=
- 2014 FC Polyana (1)
- 2015 FC Uzhhorod (1)
- 2016 FC Uzhhorod (2)
- 2017 FC Mynai (1)
- 2018 Sevlyush Vynohradiv (1)
- 2019 Sevlyush Vynohradiv (2)
- 2020 Buzhora Irshava (1)
- 2021 FC Khust (1)
- =full-scale Russian invasion=
- 2022 FC Vilkhivtsi (1)
- 2023 Sevlyush Vynohradiv (3)

=== Top winners ===
- 8 – Beregvidek Berehove
- 7 – Avanhard Svalyava
- 6 – Dynamo Mukacheve
- 4 – 3 clubs (Mukacheve, Keramik, Avanhard Kh.)
- 3 – 1 club (Sevlyush)
- 2 – 9 clubs
- 1 – 27 clubs

== Professional clubs ==
Before the World War II, on territory of the region existed at least on professional football club SC Rusj Uzhorod which until 1938 played in Czechoslovakia and during the war in 1939–1944 in Hungary.

- FC Hoverla Uzhhorod (Spartak, Verkhovyna, Zakarpattia) 1946–1949, 1951-2016 (70 seasons)
  - FC Zakarpattia-2 Uzhhorod 2001–2002 (a season)
- FC Karpaty Mukacheve (Bolshevik, Pryladyst) 1948–1949, 1968–1970, 1991–1997 (12 seasons)

- FC Fetrovyk Khust 1992–1995 (4 seasons)
- FC Berkut Bedevlia 1997–1998 (a season)
- FC Mynai, 2018– (7 seasons)
- FC Uzhhorod, 2019–2022, 2024– (4 seasons)
- MFA Mukachevo, 2021–2022 (a season)
- FC Khust, 2022– (3 seasons)
- SC Vilkhivtsi, 2024– (a season)

== Other clubs at national/republican level ==
Note: the list includes clubs that played at republican competitions before 1959 and the amateur or KFK competitions after 1964.

- Spartak Uzhhorod, 1946, 1950, 1952, 1953
- Pryladyst Mukachevo (Bilshovyk), 1947, 1950, 1967, 1971, 1972, 1975 – 1977, 1988 – 1990
- Dynamo Uzhhorod, 1948, 1949, 1976
- Bilshovyk Solotvyno, 1948
- Dynamo Mukachevo, 1949
- Bilshovyk Berehovo, 1949
- Kolhospnyk Berehovo, 1951, 1952, 1954–1959
- Iskra Mukachevo, 1951–1954
- Burevisnyk Mukachevo, 1955, 1956
- Burevisnyk Vynohradiv, 1956
- Avanhard Uzhhorod, 1958, 1959
- Avanhard Vynohradiv, 1958, 1959
- Avanhard Mukachevo, 1958, 1959
- Budivelnyk Khust, 1964, 1965, 1969, 1970
- Meblevyk Khust, 1966
- Kooperator Berehovo, 1970 – 1973
- Latorytsia Mukachevo, 1971 – 1973
- Shakhtar Ilnytsia, 1973
- DOK Vylok, 1974
- Raduvanka Uzhhorod, 1976
- Urozhai Kolchyno, 1977 – 1981, 1984
- Plastyk Vynohradovo, 1977
- Karpaty Bushtyno, 1979 – 1981
- Kolos Velyki Luchky, 1980
- Fetrovyk Khust, 1981, 1983, 1988 – 1991
- Metalist Irshava, 1982
- Avanhard Svaliava, 1984
- Karpaty Dubove, 1984
- Keramik Mukachevo, 1985, 1986
- Keramik Vynohradovo, 1991
- Aval Dovhe, 1992/93, 1993/94
- Yalynka Velykyi Bychkiv, 1992/93 – 1994/95
- Elektron Volovets, 1993/94, 1994/95
- Lokomotyv Chop, 1994/95
- Karpaty Rakhiv, 1995/96
- Berkut Bedevlia, 1996/97
- Verkhovyna Mizhhiria, 1997/98
- FC Mynai, 2017/18
- FC Uzhhorod, 2018/19
- MFA Mukachevo, 2020/21
- Vilkhivtsi, 2023/24
- Maramuresh Nyzhnia Apsha, 2023/24

== See also ==
- FFU Council of Regions
