= 2008 Ivano-Frankivsk Oblast Championship =

The Championship consisted of 12 participants.

== Final standings ==
- FC Karpaty Yaremcha
- FC Cementnyk Yamnytsia
- FC Delta Hvizdets
- FC Teplovyk Ivano-Frankivsk
- FC Enerhetyk-Halychyna-2 Halych
- FC Beskyd Nadvirna
- FC Tuzhyliv
- FC Kniahynyn Pidhaytsi
- FC Sokil Uhryniv
- FC Prykarpattia-2 Ivano-Frankivsk
- FC Probiy Horodenka
- FC Hazovyk Bohorodchany
- FC Hutsulschyna Kosiv
- FC Kalush
- FC Pokuttia Sniatyn
- FC Kolomyia (withdrew after couple of games)

== See also ==
- 2008 Ivano-Frankivsk Oblast Second League
- Ivano-Frankivsk Oblast FF
