= Football Association of Mykolaiv Oblast =

Football Association of Mykolaiv Oblast is a football governing body in the region of Mykolaiv Oblast, Ukraine. The association is a member of the Regional Council of UAF and the collective member of the UAF itself.

== History ==
The association was established on 30 November 1994.

== Presidents ==
- Mykola Yeropunov

== Previous Champions ==
- 1938 FC Sudnobudivnyk Mykolaiv (Marti Factory)
- 1945 FC Sudnobudivnyk Mykolaiv (Marti Factory) (2)
- 1946 FC Sudnobudivnyk Mykolaiv (Factory of 61 Communards)
- 1947 FC Dynamo Voznesensk
- 1948 FC Mashynobudivnyk Mykolaiv
- 1950 FC Avanhard Mykolaiv
- 1951 FC Kharchovyk Mykolaiv
- 1952 FC Varvarivka
- 1952 FC Kharchovyk Mykolaiv (2)
- 1953 FC Vodnyk Mykolaiv (Shipyard)
- 1954 FC Avanhard Mykolaiv (3)
- 1955 FC Budivelnyk Mykolaiv (Novyi Vodopiy)
- 1956 FC Avanhard Mykolaiv (Nosenko Factory) (4)
- 1957 FC Budivelnyk Mykolaiv
- 1958 FC Torpedo Mykolaiv
- 1959 FC Torpedo Mykolaiv (2)
- 1960 FC Torpedo Mykolaiv (3)
- 1961 FC Torpedo Mykolaiv (4)
- 1962 FC Vympel Mykolaiv
- 1963 FC Torpedo Mykolaiv (5)
- 1964 FC Vympel Mykolaiv (2)
- 1965 FC Torpedo Mykolaiv (6)
- 1966 FC Avanhard Mykolaiv (Leninskyi Raion)
- 1967 FC Avanhard Mykolaiv (Leninskyi Raion) (2)
- 1968 FC Budivelnyk Pervomaisk
- 1969 FC Spartak Mykolaiv
- 1970 FC Khvylia Mykolaiv
- 1971 FC Spartak Pervomaisk
- 1972 FC Khvylia Mykolaiv (2)
- 1973 FC Sudnobudivnyk Mykolaiv (6)
- 1974 FC Khvylia Mykolaiv (3)
- 1975 FC Khvylia Mykolaiv (4)
- 1976 FC Okean Mykolaiv
- 1977 FC Frehat Pervomaisk
- 1978 FC Khvylia Mykolaiv (5)
- 1979 FC Khvylia Mykolaiv (6)
- 1980 FC Okean Mykolaiv (2)
- 1981 FC Khvylia Mykolaiv (7)
- 1982 FC Torpedo Mykolaiv (7)
- 1983 FC Khvylia Mykolaiv (8)
- 1984 FC Sudnobudivnyk Mykolaiv (7)
- 1985 FC Vodnyk Mykolaiv
- 1986 FC Khvylia Mykolaiv (9)
- 1987 FC Vodnyk Mykolaiv (2)
- 1988 FC Vodnyk Mykolaiv (3)
- 1989 FC Mayak Ochakiv
- 1990 FC Vodnyk Mykolaiv (4)
- 1991 FC Olimpiya FC AES Yuzhnoukrainsk
- =independence of Ukraine=
- 1992-93 FC Olimpiya FC AES Yuzhnoukrainsk (2)
- 1993-94 FC Nyva Nechayane
- 1994-95 FC Merkuriy Pervomaisk
- 1995-96 FC Kolos Stepove
- 1996-97 FC Kolos Stepove (2)
- 1997-98 FC Hidroliznyk Olshanske
- 1998-99 FC Kolos Stepove (3)
- 1999 FC Kolos Stepove (4)
- 2000 FC Kolos Stepove (5)
- 2001 FC Vodnyk Mykolaiv (5)
- 2002 FC Vodnyk Mykolaiv (6)
- 2003 FC Kolos Stepove (6)
- 2004 FC Slavia Bashtanka
- 2005 FC Torpedo Mykolaiv (8)
- 2006 FC Torpedo Mykolaiv (9)
- 2007 FC Voronivka
- 2008 FC Torpedo Mykolaiv (10)
- 2009 FC Kazanka
- 2010 FC Torpedo Mykolaiv (11)
- 2011 FC Torpedo Mykolaiv (12)
- 2012 FC Enerhiya Mykolaiv
- 2013 FC Torpedo Mykolaiv (13)
- =Russo-Ukrainian War=
- 2014 FC Stepove (7)
- 2015 FC Vradiivka
- 2016 FC Vradiivka (2)
- 2017 MFC Pervomaisk
- 2018 MFC Pervomaisk (2)
- 2019 FC Varvarivka Mykolaiv
- 2020-21 FC Khliborob Nyzhni Torhayi
- 2021-22 FC Kazanka (2, incomplete)
- =full-scale Russian invasion=

=== Top winners ===
- 13 - FC Torpedo Mykolaiv
- 9 - FC Khvylia Mykolaiv
- 7 - FC Sudnobudivnyk (Avanhard) Mykolaiv
- 7 - FC Kolos (Stepove)
- 6 - FC Vodnyk Mykolaiv
- 2 - 8 clubs
- 1 - 21 clubs

== Professional clubs ==
- MFC Mykolaiv (Sudostroitel, Avangard), 1937, 1939-1940, 1946-1949, 1957-2022 (73 seasons)
  - MFC Mykolaiv-2, 2017–2021 (4 seasons)
- FC Stroitel Pervomaisk, 1969 (a season)
- FC Artania Ochakiv (Mayak), 1991–1995 (5 season)

- FC Enerhiya Yuzhnoukrainsk (Olimpiya FC AES), 1995–2008 (13 seasons)
- FC Vodnyk Mykolaiv, 2003–2004 (a season)
- SC Enerhiya Mykolaiv, 2013–2014 (a season)
- FC Sudnobudivnyk Mykolaiv, 2016–2018 (2 seasons)
- FC Vast Mykolaiv, 2022–2023 (2 seasons)

== Other clubs at national/republican level ==
Note: the list includes clubs that played at republican competitions before 1959 and the amateur or KFK competitions after 1964..

- Mykolaiv, 1936, 1952
- Voznesensk, 1937, 1938
- Mykolaiv-2 (Sudnobudivnyk-2/Sudnobudivnyk (klubnaya)), 1937, 1939, 1940, 1946–1949, 1977, 1978, 1985, 1996/97
- Dynamo Mykolaiv, 1938, 1950
- Dynamo Voznesensk, 1948, 1949
- Budivelnyk Mykolaiv, 1948, 1949, 1954–1957
- Mashynobudivnyk Mykolaiv, 1948
- DO Mykolaiv, 1949
- Chervonyi Prapor Mykolaiv, 1951, 1952
- Vodnyk Mykolaiv, 1953, 1976, 1986 – 1992/93, 2002, 2003
- Avanhard Mykolaiv, 1954–1956, 1958, 1959
- Pervomaisk, 1958, 1959
- Torpedo Mykolaiv, 1958, 1964 – 1966, 1974, 2008 – 2014
- Avanhard Voznesensk, 1959
- Zenit Mykolaiv, 1968
- Spartak Mykolaiv, 1969, 1970
- Komunarovets Mykolaiv, 1970
- Khvylia Mykolaiv, 1971, 1973 – 1976, 1978, 1980, 1983, 1984
- Spartak Pervomaisk, 1972, 1973
- Okean Mykolaiv, 1974 – 1977, 1979 – 1981
- Frehat Pervomaisk, 1977 – 1986, 1989 – 1991
- Iskra Voznesensk, 1978
- Budivelnyk Pervomaisk, 1981
- Zirka Mykolaiv, 1982, 1987ZH
- Pervomayets Pervomaisk, 1983, 1984
- Iskra Pervomaisk, 1988
- Mayak Ochakiv, 1989, 1990
- Olimpia AES Yuzhnoukrainsk, 1991 – 1994/95
- Kolos Novokrasne, 1991, 1992/93
- Nyva Nechaiane, 1991, 1993/94, 1994/95
- Kooperator Novyi Buh, 1992/93
- Merkuriy Pervomaisk, 1993/94, 1994/95
- SC Pervomaisk, 1995/96, 1997/98 – 1999
- Sudnobudivnyk Mykolaiv, 2016
- Kolos Stepove, 1999 – 2003, 2005
- Enerhia Mykolaiv, 2013
- Varvarivka Mykolaiv, 2014
- FC Vradiivka, 2016, 2016/17
- MFC Pervomaisk, 2016/17 – 2020/21
- VAST Mykolaiv, 2021/22

== See also ==
- FFU Council of Regions
