= Rivne Oblast Football Association =

Governing body of association football in Rivne Oblast

Rivne Oblast Football Association is a football governing body in the region of Rivne Oblast, Ukraine. The association is a member of the Regional Council of UAF and the collective member of the UAF itself.

Until the World War II, the territory of Rivne Oblast was part of the Polish Wołyń Voivodeship and since 1928 there existed own regional competition known as Wołyń District League (1928–1939). The first local created in Rivne was WKS Hallerczyki Równe in 1922. Following the Soviet occupation of the territory, all Polish sports organizations were liquidated and what remained from football clubs was united into Spartak Rivne in 1940. The team took part in the 1940 Football Cup of the Ukrainian SSR.

== Members ==
- Demydiv Raion Football Association
- Zarichne Raion Football Association
- Kostopil Raion Football Association
- Dubrovytsia Raion Football Association
- Rivne Municipal Football Association
- Berezne Raion Football Association
- Dubno Municipal Football Association
- Rokytne Raion Football Association
- Hoshcha Raion Football Association
- Sarny Raion Football Association
- Dubno Raion Football Association
- Football Association of Varash
- Ostroh Municipal Football Association

Associative

- Zdolbuniv Municipal Football Association
- Futsal Association of Rivne Oblast

== Presidents ==
- ????–???? Volodymyr Shmorhun
- 2001–2013 Volodymyr Polishchuk
- 2012–2015 Mykhailo Kryvko
- 2015–2023 Oleksiy Khakhlyov
- 2023–present Oleh Kucher

== Previous Champions ==
- 1948 Lokomotyv Rivne (1)
- 1949 Dynamo Rivne (1)
- 1950 ???
- 1951 ???
- 1952 Dynamo Rivne (2)
- 1953 Dynamo Rivne (3)
- 1954 Dynamo Rivne (4)
- 1955 Kolhospnyk Hoshcha (1)
- 1956 Kolhospnyk Hoshcha (2)
- 1957 Kolhospnyk Hoshcha (3)
- 1958 Kolhospnyk Hoshcha (4)
- 1959 Avanhard Kostopil (1)
- 1960 Spartak Rivne (1)
- 1961 Spartak Rivne (2)
- 1962 Horyn Dubrovytsia (1)
- 1963 Tekstylnyk Rivne (1)
- 1964 Avanhard Rivne (1)
- 1965 Tekstylnyk Rivne (2)
- 1966 Tekstylnyk Rivne (3)
- 1967 RZTZ Rivne (1)
- 1968 Horyn Dubrovytsia (2)
- 1969 Torpedo Rivne (1)
- 1970 Torpedo Rivne (2)
- 1971 Torpedo Rivne (3)
- 1972 Torpedo Rivne (4)
- 1973 Torpedo Rivne (5)
- 1974 Torpedo Rivne (6)
- 1975 Torpedo Rivne (7)
- 1976 Torpedo Rivne (8)
- 1977 Torpedo Rivne (9)
- 1978 Vodnyk Rivne (1)
- 1979 Budivelnyk Kuznetsovsk (1)
- 1980 Metalist Sarny (1)
- 1981 Mayak Sarny (1)
- 1982 Sluch Berezne (1)
- 1983 Sokil Chervonoarmiysk (1)
- 1984 Sluch Berezne (2)
- 1985 Sokil Chervonoarmiysk (2)
- 1986 Sluch Berezne (3)
- 1987 Spartak Dubno (1)
- 1988 Sluch Berezne (4)
- 1989 Khimik Rivne (1)
- 1990 ???
- 1991 ???
- =independence of Ukraine=
- 1992 ???
- 1992-93 Izotop Kuznetsovsk (1)
- 1994 ???
- 1995 Sokil Radyvyliv (3)
- 1996 Sokil Radyvyliv (4)
- 1997 Sluch Berezne (5)
- 1998 Sluch Berezne (6)
- 1999 Sokil Radyvyliv (5)
- 2000 Metalist Zdolbuniv (1)
- 2001 Sokil Radyvyliv (6)
- 2002 ODEK Orzhiv (1)
- 2003 ODEK Orzhiv (2)
- 2004 ODEK Orzhiv (3)
- 2005 Mayak Sarny (2)
- 2006 ODEK Orzhiv (4)
- 2007 ODEK Orzhiv (5)
- 2008 ODEK Orzhiv (6)
- 2009 Slavia Rivne (1)
- 2010 Khimik Rivne (2)
- 2011 ODEK Orzhiv (7)
- 2012 Slavia Rivne (2)
- 2013 ODEK Orzhiv (8)
- =Russo-Ukrainian War=
- 2014 ODEK Orzhiv (9)
- 2015 Mayak Sarny (3)
- 2016 ODEK Orzhiv (10)
- 2017 ODEK Orzhiv (11)
- 2018 Mayak Sarny (4)
- 2019 FC Malynsk
- 2020 ODEK Orzhiv (12)
- 2021 Mayak Sarny (5)
- =full-scale Russian invasion=
- 2022 Sokil Sadove (1)
- 2023 Mayak Sarny (6)
- 2024 Mayak Sarny (7)

=== Top winners ===
- 12 – ODEK Orzhiv
- 9 – Torpedo Rivne
- 7 – Mayak Sarny
- 6 – 2 clubs (Sluch Berezne, Sokil Radyvyliv)
- 4 – 2 clubs (Dynamo Rivne, Kolhospnyk Hoshcha)
- 3 – Tekstylnyk Rivne
- 2 – 4 clubs (Spartak, Horyn, Khimik, Slavia)
- 1 – 12 clubs

== Professional clubs ==
- NK Veres Rivne (Kolhospnyk, Horyn, Avangard), 1958–2011, 2015– (64 seasons)

- FC Ikva Mlyniv, 2003–2004 (single season)

== Other clubs at national/republican level ==
Note: the list includes clubs that played at republican competitions before 1959 and the amateur or KFK competitions after 1964.

- Dynamo Rivne, 1946, 1953, 1954
- Rivne, 1947
- Lokomotyv Rivne, 1948–1952, 1992/93
- Bilshovyk Zdolbuniv, 1949
- Urozhai Rivne, 1955
- Kolhospnyk Rivne, 1956, 1957
- Avanhard Zdolbuniv, 1958
- Kolhospnyk Hoshcha, 1958
- Spartak Dubno, 1958, 1988
- Avanhard Rivne, 1959
- Tekstylnyk Rivne, 1964 – 1966
- Horyn Dubrovytsia, 1969
- Torpedo Rivne, 1970 – 1976, 1978
- Sluch Berezne, 1976, 1979, 1980, 1989, 1990
- Vodnyk Rivne, 1979
- Budivelnyk Kuznetsovsk, 1980 – 1983
- Maiak Sarny, 1981, 1982, 2014, 2021/22
- Horyn Rivne, 1984
- Izotop Kuznetsovsk, 1986 – 1989, 1993/94, 1994/95, 1996/97
- Zoria Rivne, 1990, 1991
- Bofik Karpylivka, 1990
- Ikva Mlyniv, 1991, 2002, 2003
- Sokil Radyvyliv, 1995/96, 1997/98, 2000, 2001
- Khimik Rivne, 1997/98 – 1999
- Metalist Zdolbuniv, 1998/99 – 2001
- Lokomotyv Zdolbuniv, 2002, 2003
- Volyn-Tsement Zdolbuniv, 2004 – 2008
- ODEK Orzhiv, 2004, 2005, 2007 – 2021/22
- Torpedo Kostopil, 2004
- Malynsk, 2016 – 2019/20
- Kobra Ostroh, 2018/19

== See also ==
- FFU Council of Regions
