= Vinnytsia Oblast Football Association =

Football governing body in Vinnytsia, Ukraine

The Vinnytsia Oblast Football Association (formerly Vinnytsia Oblast Football Federation) (Note: Between 1992 and 2019, regional football organizations as well as the national Football Federation of Ukraine were called "federations". This naming followed the Soviet tradition. In 2019, the terminology was changed to align with the common European practice.) is a football governing body in the region of Vinnytsia Oblast, Ukraine. The association is a member of the Regional Council of UAF and the collective member of the UAF itself.

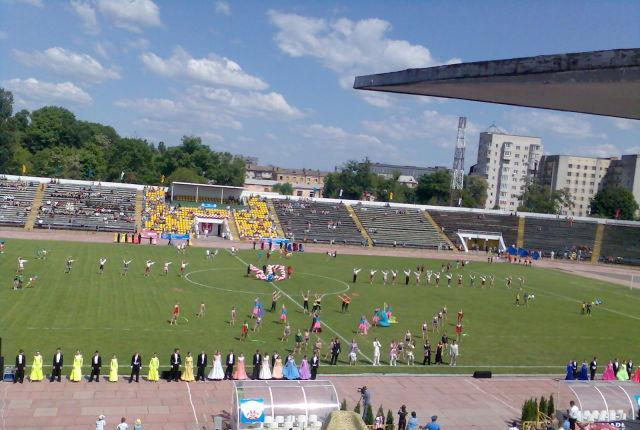
Tsentralnyi Miskyi Stadion is the main football arena in the region

The organization was established on 29 February 1992 at the constituent assembly of the organization on initiative of the Kolos sports society Vinnytsia Oblast Council leader Serhiy Tatusyak and with facilitation of the Vinnytsia Oblast districts (raions) representatives. The organization's founders became Oleksandr Visker, a referee of the Republican class, Viktor Kovalenko, a referee of the 1st class, and Vyacheslav Andryushchenko, a referee of the 1st class.

== Presidents ==
- 1992–1994 Oleksandr Visker
- 1994–2007 Volodymyr Dzyuba
- 2007–present Irek Gataullin

== Previous Champions ==
- 1932 Dynamo Proskuriv
- 1933 ?
- 1934 Dynamo Proskuriv (2)
- 1935 ?
- 1936 Dynamo Mohyliv-Podilskyi
- 1937 Vinnytsia
- 1938 Dynamo Mohyliv-Podilskyi (2)
- =World War II=
- 1939 Vinnytsia (2)
- 1940 Spartak Vinnytsia
- =end of World War II=
- 1945 Spartak Vinnytsia (2)
- 1946 Spartak Vinnytsia (3)
- 1947 (sp) Dynamo Vinnytsia
- 1947 (au) Dynamo Vinnytsia (2)
- 1948 Dynamo Vinnytsia (3)
- 1949 Dynamo Vinnytsia (4)
- 1950 Dynamo Vinnytsia (5)
- 1951 Kharchovyk Vinnytsia
- 1952 Trud Vinnytsia
- 1953 Trud Vinnytsia (2)
- 1954 Trud Vinnytsia (3)
- 1955 Lokomotyv Koziatyn
- 1956 Burevisnyk Vinnytsia
- 1957 ?
- 1958 GBO Vinnytsia
- 1959 Burevisnyk Vinnytsia (2)
- 1960 Lokomotyv Zhmerynka
- 1961 GBO Haisyn
- 1962 Burevisnyk Vinnytsia (3)
- 1963 Vzuttieva Fabryka Vinnytsia
- 1964 Burevisnyk Vinnytsia (4)
- 1965 Vostok Mohyliv-Podilskyi
- 1966 Zavod AEA Sutysky (Kolhospnyk Bar)
- 1967 Kolhospnyk Hayove
- 1968 Avtomobilist Tulchyn
- 1969 Avtomobilist Khmilnyk
- 1970 Budivelnyk Vinnytsia
- 1971 Kharchovyk Vinnytsia (2)
- 1972 Kharchovyk Vinnytsia (3)
- 1973 Kharchovyk Vinnytsia (4)
- 1974 18 GPZ Vinnytsia
- 1975 Budivelnyk Vinnytsia (2)
- 1976 Budivelnyk Vinnytsia (3)
- 1977 Intehral Vinnytsia
- 1978 Intehral Vinnytsia (2)
- 1979 Intehral Vinnytsia (3)
- 1980 Intehral Vinnytsia (4)
- 1981 Haisyn
- 1982 Intehral Vinnytsia (5)
- 1983 Temp Vinnytsia
- 1984 Hranit Sharhorod
- 1985 Kolos Serebriya
- 1986 Temp Vinnytsia (2)
- 1987 Intehral Vinnytsia (6)
- 1988 Hranit Sharhorod (2)
- 1989 Hranit Sharhorod (3)
- 1990 Podillya Kyrnasivka
- 1991 Podillya Kyrnasivka (2)
- =independence of Ukraine=
- 1992(sp) Podillya Kyrnasivka (3)
- 1992-93 Intehral Vinnytsia (7)
- 1993-94 Podillya Kyrnasivka (4)
- 1994-95 Podillya Kyrnasivka (5)
- 1995-96 Khimik Vinnytsia
- 1996-97 Fortuna Sharhorod
- 1997-98 Kirovets Mohyliv-Podilskyi
- 1998-99 Podillya Kyrnasivka (6)
- 1999-00 Podillya Kyrnasivka (7)
- 2000-01 Podillya Kyrnasivka (8)
- 2001-02 Kirovets Mohyliv-Podilskyi (2)
- 2002-03 Podillya–ML Kyrnasivka (9)
- 2003-04 Podillya–ML Tulchyn (10)
- 2004-05 Podillya–Lis Kyrnasivka (11)
- 2005-06 Lisovyk–Podillya Tulchyn (12)
- 2006-07 Avanhard Sutysky
- 2007-08 OLKAR Sharhorod (2)
- 2008-09 Avanhard Sutysky (2)
- 2009-10 Vylam Khmilnyk
- 2010-11 Tiras Yampil
- 2011-12 Derzhsluzhbovets-KFKS Vinnytsia
- 2012-13 FC Vinnytsia (2)
- =Russo-Ukrainian War=
- 2013-14 Shlyakhovyk Pohrebyshche
- 2014-15 Patriot Kukavka
- 2015-16 Fakel Lypovets
- 2016-17 EMS–Podillya Vinnytsia
- 2017-18 Svitanok–Ahrosvit Shlyakhova
- 2018-19 Svitanok–Ahrosvit Shlyakhova (2)
- 2019-20 Tomashpil
- 2020-21 Fakel Lypovets (2)
- 2021-22 =full-scale Russian invasion=
- 2022-23 YaSKO Vinnytsia
- 2023-24 Podillya Kyrnasivka (13)
- 2024-25 Univer-Dynamo Kharkiv

=== Top winners ===
- 13 – Podillya Kyrnasivka (Tulchyn)
- 7 – Intehral Vinnytsia
- 3 – 2 clubs (Budivelnyk, Kharchovyk)
- 2 – 7 clubs (Burevisnyk, Kirovets, Avanhard, Svitanok-Ahrosvit, FC Vinnytsia, Fakel, Fortuna)
- 1 – 21 clubs

== Professional clubs ==
- FC Nyva Vinnytsia (Vinnytsia, Lokomotiv), 1958-2005, 2007–2012, 2016– (62 seasons)

- FC Bershad (Nyva), 1996–1999, 2004–2006 (5 seasons)
- FC Fortuna Sharhorod, 1997–1999 (2 seasons)

== Other clubs at national/republican level ==
Note: the list includes clubs that played at republican competitions before 1959 and the amateur or KFK competitions after 1964.

- Vinnytsia, 1936, 1956–1958
- Mohyliv-Podilskyi, 1936–1938
- Spartak Vinnytsia, 1937, 1940, 1946
- Koziatyn, 1937, 1938
- Temp Vinnytsia, 1938, 1982, 1984, 1985
- Dynamo Vinnytsia, 1947–1952
- DO Vinnytsia, 1948, 1949
- Lokomotyv Zhmerynka, 1949, 1958
- Kolhospnyk Mohyliv-Podilskyi, 1951
- Trud Vinnytsia, 1953, 1954
- Burevisnyk Vinnytsia, 1955, 1964, 1966
- Avanhard Mohyliv-Podilskyi, 1958, 1959
- Avanhard Vinnytsia, 1959, 1974 – 1977
- Vostok Mohyliv-Podilskyi, 1965
- Kolos Bar, 1968
- Avtomobilist Khmilnyk, 1970
- Kharchovyk Vinnytsia, 1971, 1973
- Intehral Vinnytsia, 1978 – 1981, 1983, 1988, 1991, 1992/93
- Sokil Haisyn, 1981 – 1990
- Kolos Serbria, 1986, 1987
- OLKAR Sharhorod, 1989 – 1992/93, 2007
- Podillia Kyrnasivka, 1990, 1992/93, 1994/95
- Avanhard Ladyzhyn, 1991
- Santa-Maria Kryzhopil, 1993/94
- Avanhard Kryzhopil, 1994/95
- Svitanok Vinnytsia, 1995/96
- Kirovets Mohyliv-Podilskyi, 1998/99 – 2000
- Nyva Hnivan, 2001
- Dovira-Nyva Vinnytsia, 2003
- FC Bershad, 2004
- Nyva Vinnytsia, 2006, 2016
- Avanhard Sutysky, 2007
- Horyzont Koziatyn, 2008, 2009
- FC Vinnytsia, 2013 – 2016
- Fakel Lypovets, 2017/18, 2018/19, 2022/23
- Svitanok-Ahrosvit Shliakhova, 2019/20

== See also ==
- FFU Council of Regions
