= Football Association of Volyn =

The Oblast's coat of arms

Football Association of Volyn is a football governing body in the region of Volyn Oblast, Ukraine.The association is a member of the Regional Council of UAF and the collective member of the UAF itself.

== Presidents ==
- 1988–2009 Ihor Bezuhlyi
- 2009–2013 Vasyl Stolyar
- 2013–present Vitaliy Kvartsyanyi

== Previous champions ==
- 1948 Spartak Lutsk (1)
- 1949 Lokomotyv Kivertsi (1)
- 1950 Lokomotyv Kovel (1)
- 1951 Dynamo Kovel (1)
- 1952 Dynamo Lyuboml (1)
- 1953 Dynamo Lutsk (1)
- 1954 Dynamo Lyuboml (2)
- 1955 Kolhospnyk Horokhiv (1)
- 1956 Volodymyr-Volynskyi (1)
- 1957 Volodymyr-Volynskyi (2)
- 1958 Lutsk (1)
- 1959 GDO Lutsk (1)
- 1960 Shakhtar Novovolynsk (1)
- 1961 Zenit Volodymyr-Volynskyi (1)
- 1962 Zenit Volodymyr-Volynskyi (2)
- 1963 Zenit Volodymyr-Volynskyi (3)
- 1964 Shakhtar Novovolynsk (2)
- 1965 Shakhtar Novovolynsk (3)
- 1966 Lokomotyv Kovel (2)
- 1967 Elektryk Lutsk (1)
- 1968 Rubin Kovel (1)
- 1969 Shakhtar Novovolynsk (4)
- 1970 Spartak Kovel (1)
- 1971 Lokomotyv Kovel (3)
- 1972 Silmash Kovel (1)
- 1973 Silmash Kovel (2)
- 1974 Shakhtar Novovolynsk (5)
- 1975 Silmash Kovel (3)
- 1976 Shakhtar Novovolynsk (6)
- 1977 Prylad Lutsk (1)
- 1978 Prylad Lutsk (2)
- 1979 Prylad Lutsk (3)
- 1980 Silmash Kovel (4)
- 1981 Pidshypnyk Lutsk (1)
- 1982 Silmash Kovel (5)
- 1983 Silmash Kovel (6)
- 1984 Silmash Kovel (7)
- 1985 Pidshypnyk Lutsk (2)
- 1986 Pidshypnyk Lutsk (3)
- 1987 Pidshypnyk Lutsk (4)
- 1988 Pidshypnyk Lutsk (5)
- 1989 Pidshypnyk Lutsk (6)
- 1990 Pidshypnyk Lutsk (7)
- 1991 Pidshypnyk Lutsk (8)
- =independence of Ukraine=
- 1992 Pidshypnyk Lutsk (9)
- 1992–93 Pidshypnyk Lutsk (10)
- 1993–94 Pidshypnyk Lutsk (11)
- 1994–95 FC Kovel (1)
- 1995–96 ENKO Lutsk (1)
- 1996–97 Yavir Tsuman (1)
- 1997–98 ENKO Lutsk (2)
- 1998–99 Yavir Tsuman (2)
- 1999 Pidshypnyk Lutsk (12)
- 2000 Yavir-Volynlis Tsuman (3)
- 2001 Yavir-Volynlis Tsuman (4)
- 2002 Svityaz Shatsk (1)
- 2003 FC Kovel (2)
- 2004 FC Kovel (3)
- 2005 FC Kovel (4)
- 2006 Votrans-LSTM Lutsk (1)
- 2007 Votrans-LSTM Lutsk (2)
- 2008 MFC Kovel (5)
- 2009 MFC Kovel-Volyn (6)
- 2010 MFC Kovel-Volyn (7)
- 2011 Votrans-LSTM Lutsk (3)
- 2012–13 MFC Kovel-Volyn (8)
- =Russo-Ukrainian War=
- 2013–14 Laska Boratyn (1)
- 2014–15 Lutsksantekhmontazh-536 (1)
- 2015–16 Lutsksantekhmontazh-536 (2)
- 2016–17 Lutsksantekhmontazh-536 (3)
- 2017–18 Lutsksantekhmontazh-536 (4)
- 2018–19 Votrans Lutsk (4)
- 2019–20 Shakhtar Novovolynsk (7)
- 2020–21 Lutsksantekhmontazh-536 (5)
- =full-scale Russian invasion=
- 2022 Shakhtar Novovolynsk (8)
- 2023 Lutsksantekhmontazh-536 (6)

=== Top winners ===
- 12 – Pidshypnyk Lutsk
- 8 – MFC Kovel-Volyn and Shakhtar Novovolynsk
- 7 – Silmash Kovel
- 6 – 1 club (LSTM-536)
- 4 – 2 clubs (Yavir-Volynlis, Votrans)
- 3 – 3 clubs (Prylad, Lokomotyv Kovel, Zenit)
- 2 – 3 clubs
- 1 – 12 clubs

== Professional clubs ==
- FC Volyn Lutsk (Torpedo), 1960–1971, 1977–2022 (58 seasons)
- FC Shakher Novovolynsk, 1968 (a season)

- FC Kovel-Volyn Kovel, 2001–2003 (2 seasons)

Note:

- In 1972–1976 there existed SC Lutsk as the team of the Carpathian Military District as a merger of Torpedo Lutsk and SKA Lvov.

== Other clubs at national/republican level ==
Note: the list includes clubs that played at republican competitions before 1959 and the amateur or KFK competitions after 1964.

- Dynamo Lutsk, 1946–1956
- DO Volodymyr-Volynskyi, 1948
- GDO Lutsk, 1957–1959
- Shakhtar Novovolynsk, 1957–1959, 1965, 1966, 1972, 1977, 1992/93 – 1994/95
- Volodymyr-Volynskyi, 1959
- Lokomotyv Kovel, 1964, 1967, 1969, 1972
- Elektryk Lutsk, 1968
- Mekhanizator Rozhyshche, 1970
- Torpedo Lutsk, 1971
- Silmash Kovel, 1973 – 1976, 1980 – 1985, 1992/93 – 1994/95
- Prylad Lutsk, 1978, 1979
- Spetstekhobl Novovolynsk, 1981
- Kolos Kivertsi, 1982, 1983
- Pidshypnyk Lutsk, 1986 – 1992/93, 1994/95
- ENKO Lutsk, 1995/96
- Dynamo Manevychi, 1996/97
- Volyn-2 Lutsk, 1997/98
- Troianda-Ekspres Hirka Polonka, 1998/99
- Yavir Tsuman, 1998/99, 2001
- FC Kovel, 2000, 2001, 2016/17, 2019/20
- LDPU Lutsk, 2003
- BRW-WIK Volodymyr-Volynskyi, 2008
- FC Lutsk, 2016, 2016/17
- Votrans Lutsk, 2019/20, 2020/21
- LSTM Lutsk, 2019/20, 2022/23

== See also ==
- FFU Council of Regions
