= Odesa Oblast Football Association =

Odesa Oblast Football Association is a football governing body in the region of Odesa Oblast, Ukraine. The association is a member of the Regional Council of UAF and a collective member of the UAF itself.

The football regional championship in Odesa Oblast was held for the first time in 1951.

== Presidents ==
- 1961 – 1991 Serhiy Razdorozhnyuk
- 1991 – 1997 Heorhiy Horodenko
- 1997 – 2002 Valeriy Balukh
- 2002 – 2012 Petro Naida
- 2012 – 2018 Petro Chilibi

== Previous champions ==
- 1951 Zhovtnevyi Raion
- 1952 Chervonyi Prapor Odesa
- 1953 Shakhtar Odesa
- 1954 Shakhtar Odesa (2)
- 1955 Metalurh Odesa
- 1956 Metalurh Odesa (2)
- 1957 Vodnyk Kiliya
- 1958 Vodnyk Kiliya (2)
- 1959 Lokomotyv Kotovsk
- 1960 Dunayets Izmail
- 1961 SKA Odesa
- 1962 SKA Odesa (2)
- 1963 Torpedo Odesa
- 1964 Avtomobilist Odesa
- 1965 Torpedo Odesa (2)
- 1966 Spartak (Avtomobilist) Odesa
- 1967 Povstannia Tatarbunary
- 1968 Povstannia Tatarbunary (2)
- 1969 Povstannia Tatarbunary (3)
- 1970 Povstannia Tatarbunary (4)
- 1971 Portovyk Illichivsk
- 1972 Portovyk Illichivsk (2)
- 1973 Portovyk Illichivsk (3)
- 1974 Torpedo Odesa (3)
- 1975 Portovyk Illichivsk (4)
- 1976 Povstannia Tatarbunary (5)
- 1977 Portovyk Illichivsk (5)
- 1978 Factory of October Revolution Odesa
- 1979 Portovyk Illichivsk (6)
- 1980 Dzerzhynets Ovidiopol
- 1981 Dzerzhynets Ovidiopol (2)
- 1982 Taksi Odesa
- 1983 Sudnoremontnyk Illichivsk
- 1984 Factory of October Revolution Odesa (2)
- 1985 Dynamo Odesa
- 1986 Dynamo Odesa (2)
- 1987 Factory of October Revolution Odesa (3)
- 1988 Sudnoremontnyk Illichivsk
- 1989 Sudnoremontnyk Illichivsk (2)
- 1990 Torpedo Odesa (4)
- 1991 Dnister Ovidiopol (3)
- =independence of Ukraine=
- 1992 Blaho Blahoyeve
- 1992-93 Blaho Blahoyeve (2)
- 1993-94 Ren Reni
- 1994-95 Pervomayets Pershotravneve
- 1995-96 Blaho Blahoyeve (3)
- 1996-97 FC Lotto-GCM Odesa
- 1997-98 Dnister Ovidiopol (4)
- 1998-99 Dnister Ovidiopol (5)
- 1999-00 Dnister Ovidiopol (6)
- 2000 Dnister Ovidiopol (7)
- 2001 Tyras-2500 Bilhorod-Dnistrovskyi
- 2002 Tyras-2500 Bilhorod-Dnistrovskyi (2)
- 2003 FC Bilyayivka
- 2004 Tyras-2500 Bilhorod-Dnistrovskyi (3)
- 2005 Tyras-2500 Bilhorod-Dnistrovskyi (4)
- 2006 Tyras-2500 Bilhorod-Dnistrovskyi (5)
- 2007 Bryz (Dunayets) Izmail
- 2008 FC Bilyayivka (2)
- 2009 FC Tarutyne
- 2010 FC Tarutyne (2)
- 2011 Sovignon Tayirove
- 2012 Bessarabia Odesa
- 2013 Balkany Zorya
- =Russo-Ukrainian War=
- 2014 FC Yeremiivka
- 2015 FC Yeremiivka (2)
- 2016 Khadzhybei Usatove
- 2017 Olimp Lyukseon Krynychky
- 2018 Imeni V.Z.Tura Dmytrivka
- 2019 Imeni V.Z.Tura Dmytrivka (2)
- 2020 Khadzhybei Usatove (2)
- 2021 Imeni V.Z.Tura Dmytrivka (3)
- =full-scale Russian invasion=
- 2022 Tytan Odesa
- 2023 Tytan Odesa (2)
- 2023 Pivdenna Palmira Odesa

=== Top winners ===
- 7 – Dnister (Dzerzhynets) Ovidiopol
- 6 – Portovyk Illichivsk
- 5 – Povstannia Tatarbunary
- 5 – Tyras-2500 Bilhorod-Dnistrovskyi
- 4 – Torpedo Odesa
- 3 – 4 clubs (Factory of October Revolution, Sudnoremontnyk, Blaho, imeni V.Z.Tura)
- 2 – 12 clubs
- 1 – 12 clubs

== Professional clubs ==
- FC Dynamo Odesa, 1936–1939, 1995–1996, 1997–1999 (8 seasons)
- FC Chornomorets Odesa (Pischevik), 1940, 1945–1950, 1955– (78 seasons)
  - FC Chornomorets-2 Odesa, 1992-1995, 1999-2004, 2010-2012 (11 seasons)
- Spartak Odesa, 1941 (single season)
- Metallurg Odesa, 1953, 1954 (two seasons)
- SC Odesa (SKVO, SKA, Zvezda Tiraspol), 1958-1999 (42 seasons) → FC Chornomorets-2 Odesa
- Dunayets Izmail, 1964-1969 (6 seasons)
- Avtomobilist Odesa, 1965, 1966 (two seasons)

- FC Dnistrovets Bilhorod-Dnistrovskyi, 1994–1996 (two seasons)
- FC Portovyk Illichivsk, 1995–2002 (7 seasons)
- FC SKA-Lotto Odesa, 1997–1998 (single season)
- FC Odesa (Dnister Ovidiopol), 2001–2013 (12 seasons)
- FC Palmira Odesa, 2003–2005 (two seasons)
- FC Real Odesa, 2004–2005 (single season)
- FC Bastion Illichivsk, 2008–2011 (3 seasons)
- FC SKAD-Yalpuh Bolhrad, 2011–2012 (single season)
- FC SKA Odesa, 2012–2013 (single season)
- FC Real Pharma Odesa, 2011– (14 seasons)
- FC Zhemchuzhyna Odesa, 2016–2018 (2 seasons)
- FC Balkany Zorya, 2016–2022 (6 seasons)

== Other clubs at national/republican level ==
Note: the list includes clubs that played at republican competitions before 1959 and the amateur or KFK competitions after 1964..

- z-d KinAp Odesa 1936
- Kharchovyk Odesa, 1938, 1939
- Spartak Izmail, 1946–1949
- Dynamo Odesa, 1946, 1949, 1950, 1986 – 1991, 1994/95
- Vodnyk Odesa, 1947, 1949
- Torpedo Odesa, 1948, 1949, 1964, 1966, 1991 – 1994/95
- Bilshovyk Odesa, 1948
- Lokomotyv Kotovsk, 1948, 1949
- Lokomotyv Rozdilna, 1949
- DO Izmail, 1949
- Lokomotyv Odesa, 1950
- Metalurh Odesa, 1951, 1952, 1956
- Spartak Odesa, 1951, 1952
- Kolhospnyk Ulyanovka, 1951
- Vodnyk Izmail, 1951, 1952, 1959
- SKVO (SKA, ODO, DO) Odessa, 1952, 1954–1959
- Shakhtar Odesa, 1953–1955
- Dynamo Izmail, 1953
- Avanhard Odesa, 1958
- Chervonohvardiets Odesa, 1959
- Syhnal Kotovsk, 1965
- Vostannie Tatarbunary, 1968, 1970
- Taksomotor Odesa, 1969
- Portovyk Illichivsk, 1971 – 1978
- Hvardiets Odesa, 1974
- Shtorm Odesa, 1975
- Kolos Tatarbunary, 1977
- Zavod Oktiabrskoy Revoliutsii Odesa, 1979, 1985
- Sudnoremontnyk Illichivsk, 1979 – 1982, 1984, 1987 – 1989
- Suvorovets Izmail, 1981 – 1983
- Kotovsk, 1983
- Zirka Odesa, 1984
- Illichivets Illichivsk, 1985
- Portovyk Izmail, 1986
- Dunaets Izmail, 1989
- Vodnyk Illichivsk, 1990
- Khvylia Illichivsk, 1991
- Blaho Blahoyeve, 1992/93 – 1995/96
- Enerhia Illichivsk, 1992/93 – 1994/95
- Dnistrovets Bilhorod-Dnistrovskyi, 1991 – 1993/94, 2001
- Bryz Izmail, 1992/93 – 1994/95, 2006, 2007
- Birzula Kotovsk, 1993/94, 1994/95
- Ren Reni, 1994/95
- Dnister Ovidiopol, 1998/99 – 2001
- Ivan Odesa, 2003 – 2007
- Real Odesa, 2003, 2004
- Biliaivka, 2006
- Bastion/Bastion-2 Illichivsk, 2007, 2008, 2009, 2013
- Real Pharma Odesa, 2011
- SKAD Bolhrad, 2011
- SKA Odesa, 2012
- Savinion Tairove, 2012
- Tarutyne, 2012
- Balkany Zoria, 2014 – 2016
- Zhemchuzhyna Odesa, 2015, 2016
- Tytan Odesa, 2023/24, 2024/25

== Notable footballers ==
=== Soviet Union national football team ===
- Volodymyr Muntyan
- Leonid Buryak
- Ihor Belanov
- Igor Dobrovolskiy
- Yuriy Nikiforov
- Serhiy Shmatovalenko
- Leonard Adamov
- Vyacheslav Leshchuk

=== Ukraine national football team ===
- Andriy Voronin
- Heorhiy Bushchan
- Dmytro Parfyonov
- Serhiy Shmatovalenko
- Yuriy Bukel
- Volodymyr Shepelyev
- Serhiy Husyev
- Oleksandr Pryzetko
- Kyrylo Kovalchuk
- Serhiy Tkachenko
- Volodymyr Musolitin
- Oleksandr Hranovskyi
- Vladyslav Kabayev
- Yuriy Nikiforov
- Andriy Telesnenko
- Ilya Tsymbalar
- Kostyantyn Balabanov
- Vladyslav Kocherhin

== See also ==
- FFU Council of Regions
