= Khmelnytskyi Oblast Football Association =

Khmelnytskyi Oblast Football Association is a football governing body in the region of Khmelnytskyi Oblast, Ukraine. The association is a member of the Regional Council of UAF and the collective member of the UAF itself.

== Previous Champions ==
- 1939 FC Dynamo Kamianets-Podilskyi
- 1940 FC Dynamo Kamianets-Podilskyi (2)
- 1953 FC Dynamo Proskuriv
- 1954 FC Burevisnyk Kamianets-Podilskyi
- 1955 FC Burevisnyk Kamianets-Podilskyi (2)
- 1956 FC Burevisnyk Kamianets-Podilskyi (3)
- 1957 FC Burevisnyk Kamianets-Podilskyi (4)
- 1958 FC Burevisnyk Kamianets-Podilskyi (5)
- 1959 FC Burevisnyk Kamianets-Podilskyi (6)
- 1960 FC Podillya Kamianets-Podilskyi
- 1961 FC Podillya Kamianets-Podilskyi (2)
- 1962 FC Podillya Kamianets-Podilskyi (3)
- 1963 FC Podillya Kamianets-Podilskyi (4)
- 1964 FC Podillya Kamianets-Podilskyi (5)
- 1965 FC Burevisnyk Kamianets-Podilskyi (7)
- 1966 FC Podillya Kamianets-Podilskyi (6)
- 1967 FC Podillya Kamianets-Podilskyi (7)
- 1968 FC Enerhiya Khmelnytskyi
- 1969 FC Mebelnyk Khmelnytskyi
- 1970 FC Sluch Krasyliv
- 1971 FC Elektron (Podillya) Kamianets-Podilskyi (8)
- 1972 FC Elektron (Podillya) Kamianets-Podilskyi (9)
- 1973 FC Sluch Krasyliv (2)
- 1974 FC Sluch Krasyliv (3)
- 1975 FC Burevisnyk Kamianets-Podilskyi (8)
- 1976 FC Enerhiya Khmelnytskyi (2)
- 1977 FC Burevisnyk Kamianets-Podilskyi (9)
- 1978 Khmelnytskyi National University
- 1979 Khmelnytskyi National University (2)
- 1980 FC Sluch Krasyliv (4)
- 1981 FC Sluch Krasyliv (5)
- 1982 FC Kation Khmelnytskyi
- 1983 FC Korchahinets Shepetivka
- 1984
- 1985
- 1986 FC Traktor Khmelnytskyi
- 1987 FC Proton Netishyn
- 1988 FC Traktor Khmelnytskyi (2)
- 1989 FC Strila Volochysk
- 1990 FC Iskra Teofipol
- 1991 FC Zbruch Volochysk (2)
- =independence of Ukraine=
- 1992 FC Advis Khmelnytskyi (3)
- 1992-93 FC Advis Khmelnytskyi (4)
- 1993 FC Advis Khmelnytskyi (5)
- 1994 FC Nyva-Tekstylnyk Dunayivtsi
- 1995 FC Impuls Kamianets-Podilskyi
- 1996 FC Enerhetyk Netishyn (2)
- 1997 FC Advis Khmelnytskyi (6)
- 1998 FC Advis Khmelnytskyi (7)
- 1999 FC Dynamo-Orbita Kamianets-Podilskyi (3)
- 2000 FC Zbruch Volochysk (3)
- 2001 FC Podillya-2 Khmelnytskyi (2)
- 2002 FC Iskra Teofipol (2)
- 2003 FC Iskra Teofipol (3)
- 2004 FC Nyva-Tekstylnyk Dunayivtsi (2)
- 2005 FC Zbruch Volochysk (4)
- 2006 FC Budfarfor Slavuta
- 2007 FC Iskra Teofipol (4)
- 2008 FC Zbruch-Astarta Volochysk (5)
- 2009 FC Zbruch-Ahro Volochysk (6)
- 2010 FC Podillya Khmelnytskyi (3)
- 2011 FC Zbruch Volochysk (7)
- 2012 FC Zbruch Volochysk (8)
- 2013 FC Sluch Starokostiantyniv
- =Russo-Ukrainian War=
- 2014 FC Zbruch Volochysk (9)
- 2015 FC Zbruch Volochysk (10)
- 2016 FC Ahrobiznes Volochysk
- 2017 FC Ahrobiznes-2 Volochysk (2)
- 2018 FC Sluch Krasyliv (6)
- 2019 FC Epitsentr Dunayivtsi (3)
- 2020 FC Ahrobiznes Nova Ushytsia
- 2021 FC Kolos Polonne
- =full-scale Russian invasion=
- 2022 FC Iskra Teofipol (5)
- 2023 FC Kolos Polonne (2)

=== Top winners ===
- 10 - FC Zbruch (Strila) Volochysk
- 9 - FC Elektron (Podillya) Kamianets-Podilskyi
- 9 - FC Burevisnyk Kamianets-Podilskyi
- 7 - FC Advis (Traktor) Khmelnytskyi
- 6 - FC Sluch Krasyliv
- 5 - FC Iskra Teofipol
- 3 - 3 clubs (Podillia, Dynamo K-P, Epitsentr)
- 2 - 5 clubs (Enerhetyk N., KhNU, Enerhiya Kh., Ahrobiznes (Ahrobiznes-2), Kolos)
- 1 - 8 clubs
- Notes:
  - Officially Ahrobiznes Volochysk and Zbruch Volochysk is not one and the same club. For more details, see the article on FC Ahrobiznes Volochysk.

== Professional clubs ==
locations of all professional clubs and "teams of maters"
- FC Podillya Khmelnytskyi (Dynamo), 1960–2004, 2007–2014, 2016-2022, 2023- (60 seasons)
- FC Podillia Kamianets-Podilskyi, 1968-1970 (3 seasons)
- FC Temp Shepetivka, 1991-1995 (5 seasons)

- FC Advis Khmelnytskyi, 1994-1995 (a season)
- Ratusha Kamianets-Podilskyi, 1996 (half a season)
- FC Krasyliv, 2000-2007 (7 seasons)
- FC Ahrobiznes Volochysk, 2017-2022, 2023- (7 seasons)
- FC Epitsentr Kamianets-Podilskyi (Dunaivtsi), 2020- (5 seasons)

== Other clubs at national/republican level ==
Note: the list includes clubs that played at republican competitions before 1959 and the amateur or KFK competitions after 1964. Until September of 1937 Khmelnytskyi Oblast was part of Vinnytsia Oblast.

- Kamianets-Podilsk, 1936–1938
- Dynamo Kamianets-Podilskyi, 1939, 1948, 1949, 2000
- Podillia Khmelnytskyi/Proskuriv (Dynamo), 1940, 1946–1949, 1951–1956, 1958, 1959, 1981, 2007, 2014, 2016
- Lokomotyv Shepetivka, 1948, 1949
- Burevisnyk Kamianets-Podilskyi, 1957–1959, 1966, 1976, 1978, 1985 – 1989
- Podillia Kamianets-Podilskyi, 1964, 1965, 1967, 1991
- Avanhard Khmelnytskyi, 1969
- Enerhia Khmelnytskyi, 1970
- Sluch Krasyliv, 1971 – 1976, 1979, 1992/93, 1993/94
- Elektroprylad Kamianets-Podilskyi, 1972
- Tsementnyk Kamianets-Podilskyi, 1977, 1993/94
- Metalurh Starokostiantyniv, 1979
- Kolos Kamianets-Podilskyi, 1980, 1982
- Kation Khmelnytskyi, 1983
- Korchahinets Shepetivka, 1984
- Iskra Teofipol, 1989 – 1992/93, 2004, 2006
- Smotrych Kamianets-Podilskyi, 1990
- Temp Shepetivka, 1990
- Advis Khmelnytskyi, 1990 – 1993/94
- Enerhetyk Netishyn, 1994/95
- Petridava Kamianets-Podilskyi, 1994/95
- Epitsentr Dunaivtsi, 1995/96, 1997/98 – 1999, 2001, 2008 – 2010, 2019/20
- Budfarfor Slavuta, 2007
- Zbruch Volochysk, 2009, 2011, 2013
- Ahrobiznes Volochysk, 2016, 2016/17
- SC Khmelnytskyi, 2017/18, 2018/19
- Kolos Polonne, 2022/23–2024/25

== Notable footballers ==
=== Soviet Union national football team ===
- Volodymyr Kaplychnyi

=== Ukraine national football team ===
- Dmytro Chyhrynskyi
- Vladyslav Vanat
- Oleksiy Hutsulyak
- Bohdan Shershun

== See also ==
- FFU Council of Regions
