= Ivan Duran (politician) =

- Іван Дуран
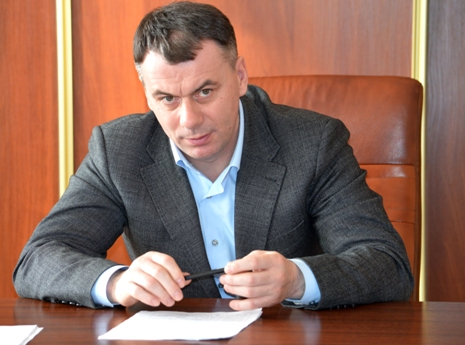

Governor of Zakarpattia Oblast (acting)
- In office 11 June 2019 – 5 July 2019
- Preceded by: Hennadiy Moskal
- Succeeded by: Ihor Bondarenko

Deputy Governor of Zakarpattia Oblast
- In office January 2016 – 11 June 2019

Personal details
- Born: Ivan Petrovych Duran; 24 August 1971 (age 54) Shchaslyve, Ukraine, Soviet Union

Ivan Petrovych Duran (Ukrainian: Іван Петрович Дуран; born on 24 August 1971), is a Ukrainian politician and activist who had served as the acting Governor of Zakarpattia Oblast in 2019.

== Biography ==
Ivan Duran was born on 24 August 1971 in the village of Schaslyve, now Mukachevo district, Zakarpattia Oblast.

He has two higher educations: in 1995 he graduated from the Lviv Commercial Academy with a degree in enterprise economics, in 2008 he received a degree in law at the Uzhgorod National University.

He had worked in the Security Service of Ukraine.

Since 2015, he was one of the directors of the Zakarpattia Oblast Football Federation. He is the president of FC Uzhhorod.

In January 2016, Duran served as first deputy chairman of the Zakarpattian Regional State Administration.

On 11 June 2019, Duran became the acting Governor of Zakarpattia Oblast. He was replace by Ihor Bondarenko on 5 July.
