= Football Association of Chernivtsi Oblast =

Football governing body in Ukraine

Football Association of Chernivtsi Oblast is a football governing body in the region of Chernivtsi Oblast, Ukraine. It is unofficially known as the Football Federation of Bukovyna. The association is a collective member of the Ukrainian Association of Football.

== Previous Champions ==
- 1941 FC Spartak Chernivtsi
- 1942–1944 World War II
- 1945 m/u 224374 Chernivtsi
- 1946 FC Spartak Chernivtsi (2)
- 1947 FC Aviagarnizon Chernivtsi
- 1948 FC Dynamo Chernivtsi
- 1949 FC Kolhospnyk Lenkivtsi
- 1950 FC Kolhospnyk Lenkivtsi (2)
- 1951 FC Dynamo Chernivtsi (2)
- 1952 ODO Chernivtsi
- 1953 FC Dynamo Chernivtsi (3)
- 1954 FC Dynamo Chernivtsi (4)
- 1955 FC Burevisnyk Chernivtsi
- 1956 FC Dynamo Chernivtsi (5)
- 1957 FC Burevisnyk Chernivtsi (2)
- 1958 (sp) FC Dynamo Chernivtsi (6)
- 1958 (fl) ODO Chernivtsi (2)
- 1959 FC Avanhard Chernivtsi
- 1960 FC Avanhard Chernivtsi (2)
- 1961 FC Bukovyna Chernivtsi (3)
- 1962 FC Kolhospnyk Kitsman
- 1963 ODO Chernivtsi (3)
- 1964 FC Kolhospnyk Kitsman (2)
- 1965 FC Bukovyna Chernivtsi (4)
- 1966 FC Bukovyna Chernivtsi (5)
- 1967 FC Kolhospnyk Zastavna
- 1968 FC Voskhod Chernivtsi
- 1969 FC Voskhod Chernivtsi (2)
- 1970 FC Lehmash Chernivtsi
- 1971 DOK Chernivtsi
- 1972 FC Kolhospnyk Kitsman
- 1973 FC Voskhod Chernivtsi
- 1974 FC Voskhod Chernivtsi (2)
- 1975 FC Kolos Luzhany
- 1976 FC Bukovyna Chernivtsi (6)
- 1977 FC Siret Storozhynets
- 1978 FC Siret Storozhynets (2)
- 1979 DOK Chernivtsi (2)
- 1980 FC Meteor Chernivtsi
- 1981 FC Lehmash Chernivtsi (2)
- 1982 FC HVZ Chernivtsi
- 1983 FC Karpaty Storozhynets
- 1984 FC Lehmash Chernivtsi (3)
- 1985 FC Lehmash Chernivtsi (4)
- 1986 FC Lehmash Chernivtsi (5)
- 1987 FC Emalposud Sadhora
- 1988 FC Emalposud Sadhora (2)
- 1989 FC Emalposud Sadhora (3)
- 1990 FC Lehmash Chernivtsi (6)
- 1991 FC Lada Chernivtsi
- =independence of Ukraine=
- 1992 FC Lada Chernivtsi (2)
- 1992–93 FC Lada Chernivtsi (3)
- 1993–94 FC Lehmash Chernivtsi (7)
- 1994–95 FC Meblevyk-Rozvytok Chernivtsi
- 1995–96 FC Meblevyk Chernivtsi (2)
- 1996–97 FC Kolos Novoselytsia
- 1997–98 FC Cheremosh Vyzhnytsia
- 1998–99 FC Kalynivsky Rynok Sadhora
- 1999–2000 FC Mytnyk Vadul-Siret
- 2000 (fl) FC Luzhany (2)
- 2001 FC Mytnyk Vadul-Siret (2)
- 2002 FC Luzhany (3)
- 2003 FC Mytnyk Vadul-Siret (3)
- 2004 FC Luzhany (4)
- 2005 FC Luzhany (5)
- 2006 FC Malyk Doroshivtsi
- 2007 FC Kitsman
- 2008 FC Luzhany (6)
- 2009 FC Dnister Doroshivtsi
- 2010 FC Banyliv
- 2011 FC Banyliv (2)
- 2012 FC Hlyboka
- 2013 FC Mayak Velykyi Kuchuriv
- =Russo-Ukrainian War=
- 2014 FC Pidhiria Storozhynets
- 2015 FC Voloka
- 2016 FC Voloka (2)
- 2017 FC Universytet Chernivtsi
- 2018 FC Nepolokivtsi
- 2019 FC Voloka (3)
- 2020 USC Dovbush Chernivtsi
- 2021 USC Dovbush Chernivtsi (2)
- 2022 full-scale Russian invasion
- 2022–23 FC Fazenda Chernivtsi

=== Top winners ===
- 7 – FC Lehmash Chernivtsi
- 6 – 3 clubs (Dynamo Ch., Bukovyna (Avanhard), (Kolos) Luzhany)
- 5 – DOK (ODO) Chernivtsi
- 4 – FC Voskhod Chernivtsi
- 3 – 6 clubs (Kolhospnyk K., Emalposud, Lada, Mytnyk, Pidhiria (Siret), Voloka)
- 2 – 6 clubs
- 1 – 17 clubs

== Cup winners ==
- 1940–41 FC Dynamo Chernivtsi
- 1941–1944 World War II
- 1945 m/u 21247 Chernivtsi
- 1946 ODO Chernivtsi
- 1947 FC Aviagarnizon Chernivtsi
- 1948 FC Aviagarnizon Chernivtsi
- 1949 Franko Kolkhoz Lenkivtsi
- 1950 FC Dynamo Chernivtsi
- 1951 FC HVZ Chernivtsi
- 1952 ODO Chernivtsi
- 1953 FC Dynamo Chernivtsi
- 1954 FC Dynamo Chernivtsi
- 1955 FC Burevisnyk Chernivtsi
- 1956 m/u 29917 Chernivtsi
- 1957 FC Burevisnyk Chernivtsi
- 1958 FC Dynamo Chernivtsi
- 1959 FC Kolhospnyk Novoselytsia
- 1960 FC Avanhard Chernivtsi
- 1961 FC Voskhod Chernivtsi
- 1962 FC Mashynobudivnyk Chernivtsi
- 1963 FC Voskhod Chernivtsi
- 1964 FC Mashynobudivnyk Chernivtsi
- 1965 FC Voskhod Chernivtsi
- 1966 FC Mashynobudivnyk Chernivtsi
- 1967 FC Voskhod Chernivtsi
- 1968 FC Voskhod Chernivtsi
- 1969 FC Voskhod Chernivtsi
- 1970 FC Lehmash Chernivtsi
- 1970 DOK Chernivtsi
- 1971 DOK Chernivtsi
- 1972 FC Lehmash Chernivtsi
- 1973 FC Voskhod Chernivtsi
- 1974 FC Voskhod Chernivtsi
- 1975 SC Bukovyna Chernivtsi
- 1976 FC Siret Storozhynets
- 1977 FC Cheremosh Vyzhnytsia
- 1978 FC Siret Storozhynets
- 1979 FC Meteor Chernivtsi
- 1980 FC Lehmash Chernivtsi
- 1981 FC Meteor Chernivtsi
- 1982 SC Bukovyna Chernivtsi
- 1983 FC HVZ Chernivtsi
- 1984 FC Lehmash Chernivtsi
- 1984 FC Karpaty Storozhynets
- 1985 FC Druzhba Kyseliv
- 1986 FC Emalposud Sadhora
- 1987 FC Lehmash Chernivtsi
- 1988 FC Emalposud Sadhora
- 1989 FC Emalposud Sadhora
- 1990 FC Metalist Chernivtsi
- 1991 FC Lehmash Chernivtsi
- 1992 FC Lehmash Chernivtsi
- 1993 FC Karpaty Sadhora
- 1993–94 FC Karpaty Sadhora
- 1994–95 FC Pidhiria Storozhynets
- 1995–96 FC Meblevyk Chernivtsi
- 1995–96 FC Karpaty Sadhora
- 1996–97 FC Mytnyk Vadul-Siret
- 1997–98 FC Luzhany
- 1998–99 FC Universytet Chernivtsi
- 1999–2000 FC Luzhany
- 2001 FC Luzhany
- 2002 FC Kalynivsky Rynok Sadhora
- 2003 FC Luzhany
- 2004 FC Mytnyk Vadul-Siret
- 2005 FC Pidhiria Storozhynets
- 2006 FC Mytnyk Vadul-Siret
- 2007 FC Luzhany
- 2008 FC Kitsman
- 2009 FC Luzhany
- 2010 FC Dnister Doroshivtsi
- 2011 FC Kolos-Maya Novoselytsia
- 2012 FC Banyliv
- 2013 FC Novoselytsia
- 2014 FC Pidhiria Storozhynets
- 2015 FC Mayak Velykyi Kuchuriv
- 2016 FC Voloka
- 2017
- 2018

== Professional clubs ==
locations of all professional clubs and "teams of maters"
- Dynamo Chernivtsi, 1949 (a season)
- FC Bukovyna Chernivtsi (Avangard), 1960– (65 seasons)

- FC Lada Chernivtsi, 1994–1995 (a season)

== Other clubs at national/republican level ==
Note: the list includes clubs that played at republican competitions before 1959 and the amateur or KFK competitions after 1964.

- Spartak Chernivtsi, 1946, 1947, 1949
- Dynamo Chernivtsi, 1948, 1950–1955, 1958
- Lokomotyv Chernivtsi, 1949
- Avanhard Chernivtsi, 1958, 1959
- Burevisnyk Chernivtsi, 1956
- Mashynobudivnyk Chernivtsi, 1959
- Kolhospnyk Kitsman, 1964
- Vostok Chernivtsi, 1965, 1969, 1970, 1974, 1975
- Mashzavod Chernivtsi, 1966
- Lehmash Chernivtsi, 1971, 1982, 1985, 1986
- DOK Chernivtsi, 1972, 1980
- Avtomobilist Kitsman, 1973
- FC Luzhany, 1976, 1977, 2001–2003, 2007–2009
- Bukovyna/Bukovyna-2 Chernivtsi, 1977, 2001, 2013
- Budivelnyk Storozhynets, 1977–1980
- Meteor Chernivtsi, 1981
- HVZ Chernivtsi, 1983
- Karpaty Storozhynets, 1984, 1987
- Emalposud Chernivtsi, 1988
- Karpaty Chernivtsi, 1989
- Lada Chernivtsi, 1992–93, 1993–94
- Meblevyk Chernivtsi, 1995–96
- Dnister Novodnistrovsk, 1998–99
- ChTEI Chernivtsi, 2003
- FC Voloka, 2016
- Dovbush Chernivtsi, 2020–21, 2021–22

== See also ==
- FFU Council of Regions
