= Ivano-Frankivsk Oblast Football Association =

Ivano-Frankivsk Oblast Football Association (IFOFA) is a football governing body in the region of Ivano-Frankivsk Oblast, Ukraine. The association is a member of the Regional Council of UAF and the collective member of the UAF itself.

== History ==
The association (then federation) (Note: Between 1992 and 2019, regional football organizations as well as the national Football Federation of Ukraine were called "federations". This naming followed the Soviet tradition. In 2019, the terminology was changed to align with the common European practice.) was established on January 23, 1991, although is listed on the official web-site of the Football Federation of Ukraine as of February 29, 1992. Previously during the World War II, local teams participated in championship of Galicia (Halychyna) that was conducted by both Soviet and Nazi authorities, while in 1934-39 it was part of the Polish football as the Stanislawow District of the Polish Football Association.

== Presidents ==
- 1990 – 1998 Taras Klym
- 1998 – 2006 Zinoviy Shkutiak
- 2006 – 2013 Viktor Anushkevichius
- 2013 – 2017 Taras Klym
- 2017 – Andriy Bondarenko

== Previous champions ==
- 1945 FC Blyskavka Kolomyia
- 1946 FC Spartak Stanislav
- 1947 FC Kalush
- 1948 FC Dynamo Stanislav
- 1949 FC Spartak Stanislav (2)
- 1950 DTSRM Stanislav
- 1951 FC Spartak Stanislav (3)
- 1952 FC Khimik Kalush (2)
- 1953 FC Spartak Stanislav (4)
- 1954 FC Iskra Kolomyia
- 1955 FC Khimik Kalush (3)
- 1956 FC Burevisnyk Kolomyia
- 1957 FC Khimik Kalush (4)
- 1958 FC Khimik Kalush (5)
- 1959 FC Khimik Kalush (6)
- 1960 FC Khimik Kalush (7)
- 1961 FC Khimik Kalush (8)
- 1962 AC Osmoloda Perehinske
- 1963 FC Naftovyk Nadvirna
- 1964 FC Naftovyk Dolyna
- 1965 FC Naftovyk Nadvirna (2)
- 1966 FC Khimik Kalush (9)
- 1967 FC Khimik Kalush (10)
- 1968 FC Karpaty Kolomyia
- 1969 FC Khimik Kalush (11)
- 1970 FC Budivelnyk Kalush
- 1971 FC Prylad Ivano-Frankivsk
- 1972 FC Elektron Ivano-Frankivsk
- 1973 FC Elektron Ivano-Frankivsk (2)
- 1974 FC Elektron Ivano-Frankivsk (3)
- 1975 FC Khimik Kalush (12)
- 1976 FC Elektron Ivano-Frankivsk (4)
- 1977 FC Elektron Ivano-Frankivsk (5)
- 1978 FC Khimik Kalush (13)
- 1979 FC Naftovyk Dolyna (2)
- 1980 FC Naftovyk Dolyna (3)
- 1981 FC Lokomotyv Ivano-Frankivsk
- 1982 FC Lokomotyv Ivano-Frankivsk (2)
- 1983 FC Naftovyk Dolyna (4)
- 1984 FC Naftovyk Dolyna (5)
- 1985 FC Elektron Ivano-Frankivsk (6)
- 1986 FC Kolos Holyn
- 1987 FC Kolos Holyn (2)
- 1988 FC Bystrytsia Nadvirna (3)
- 1989 FC Naftovyk Dolyna (6)
- 1990 FC Naftovyk Dolyna (7)
- 1991 FC Pokuttia Kolomyia
- =independence of Ukraine=
- 1992 FC Khutrovyk Tysmenytsia
- 1992-93 FC Limnytsia Perehinske
- 1993-94 FC Naftovyk Dolyna (8)
- 1994-95 FC Khimik Kalush (14)
- 1995-96 FC Avtolyvmas Ivano-Frankivsk
- 1996-97 FC Naftovyk Dolyna (9)
- 1997-98 FC Enerhetyk Burshtyn
- 1998-99 FC Probiy Horodenka
- 1999 FC Tekhno-Tsentr Rohatyn
- 2000 FC Korolivka
- 2001 FC Probiy Horodenka
- 2002 FC Teplovyk Ivano-Frankivsk
- 2003 FC Delta Hvizdets
- 2004 FC Delta Hvizdets (2)
- 2005 FC Delta Hvizdets (3)
- 2006 FC Tsementnyk Yamnytsia
- 2007 FC Karpaty Yaremche
- 2008 FC Karpaty Yaremche (2)
- 2009 FC Karpaty Yaremche (3)
- 2010 FC Karpaty Pechenizhyn
- 2011 FC Karpaty Kolomyia
- 2012 FC Karpaty Yaremche (4)
- 2013 FC Karpaty Kolomyia (2)
- =Russo-Ukrainian War=
- 2014 FC Karpaty Broshniv
- 2015 FC Oskar Pidhirya
- 2016 FC Oskar Pidhirya (2)
- 2016-17 FC Karpaty Kolomyia (3)
- 2017-18 FC Halych
- 2018-19 FC Naftovyk Dolyna (10)
- 2019-20 FC Pokuttia Kolomyia (2)
- 2020-21 FC Urahan Cherniiv
- 2021-22 full-scale Russian invasion
- 2022-23 FC Vilkhivtsi

Note: In 1993-99 the championship was organized by fall-spring calendar. In 1999 the main competition was shifted back to the summer calendar. Therefore, there are two champions in 1999.

=== Winners ===
- 13 - FC Kalush
- 10 - FC Naftovyk Dolyna
- 7 - FC Elektron Ivano-Frankivsk
- 4 - 4 clubs (Spartak, Silmash K., Karpaty Ya., Karpaty (Pechenizhyn))
- 3 - FC Bystrytsia Nadvirna (also Naftovyk)
- 3 - FC Delta Hvizdets
- 2 - 6 clubs
- 1 - 15 clubs

=== Cup winners ===
- 1940 FC Dynamo Stanislav
- 1941-45 WWII
- 1946 FC Hvardiyets Stanislav
- 1947 FC Khimik Kalush
- 1948 FC Dynamo Stanislav
- 1949 FC Spartak Stanislav
- 1950 FC Dynamo Stanislav
- 1951 FC Iskra Stanislav
- 1952 FC Spartak Stanislav
- 1953 FC Spartak Stanislav
- 1954 FC Spartak Stanislav
- 1955 FC Spartak Stanislav
- 1956 FC Khimik Kalush
- 1957 FC Khimik Kalush
- 1958 FC Khimik Kalush
- 1959 FC Khimik Kalush
- 1960 FC Khimik Kalush
- 1961 FC Khimik Kalush
- 1962 FC Naftovyk Dolyna
- 1963 FC Khimik Kalush
- 1964 FC Karpaty Broshniv
- 1965 FC Karpaty Broshniv
- 1966 FC Karpaty Kolomyia
- 1967 FC Avtomobilist Ivano-Frankivsk
- 1968 FC Naftovyk Dolyna
- 1969 FC Khimik Kalush
- 1970 FC Karpaty Kolomyia
- 1971 FC Khimik Kalush
- 1972 FC Khimik Kalush
- 1973 FC Elektron Ivano-Frankivsk
- 1974 FC Elektron Ivano-Frankivsk
- 1975 FC Khimik Kalush
- 1976 FC Elektron Ivano-Frankivsk
- 1977 FC Elektron Ivano-Frankivsk
- 1978 FC Elektron Ivano-Frankivsk
- 1979 FC Bystrytsia Nadvirna
- 1980 FC Naftovyk Dolyna
- 1981 FC Lokomotyv Ivano-Frankivsk
- 1982 FC Khimik Kalush
- 1983 FC Elektron Ivano-Frankivsk
- 1984 FC Mayak Pidhirya
- 1985 FC Silmash Kolomyia
- 1986 FC Kolos Holyn
- 1987 FC Bystrytsia Nadvirna
- 1988 FC Naftovyk Dolyna
- 1989 FC Naftovyk Dolyna
- 1990 FC Mashbud Ivano-Frankivsk
- 1991 FC Khimik Kalush
- 1992 no competition
- 1993 FC Pokuttia Kolomyia
- 1994 FC Beskyd Nadvirna
- 1995 FC Pokuttia Kolomyia
- 1996 FC Probiy Horodenka
- 1997 FC Enerhetyk Burshtyn
- 1998 FC Beskyd Nadvirna
- 1999 FC Korona Ivano-Frankivsk
- 2000 FC Korolivka
- 2001 FC Delta Hvizdets
- 2002 FC Delta Hvizdets
- 2003 FC Teplovyk Ivano-Frankivsk
- 2004 FC Teplovyk Ivano-Frankivsk
- 2005 FC Tuzhyliv
- 2006 FC Tsementnyk Yamnytsia
- 2007 FC Karpaty Yaremche
- 2008 FC Karpaty Yaremche
- 2009 FC Karpaty Yaremche
- 2010 FC Karpaty Yaremche
- 2011 FC Karpaty Kolomyia
- 2012 FC Karpaty Kolomyia
- 2013 FC Hazovyk Bohorodchany
- 2014

== Professional clubs ==
locations of all professional clubs and "teams of maters"
- FC Spartak Ivano-Frankivsk (Prykarpattia Ivano-Frankivsk), 1956–2007 (52 seasons)
  - FC Chornohora Ivano-Frankivsk (Prykarpattia-2 Ivano-Frankivsk), 1999–2006 (7 seasons)

- FC Beskyd Nadvirna, 1993–1994 (a season)
- FC Khutrovyk Tysmenytsia, 1993–1998 (5 seasons)
- FC Kalush, 1995–2005, 2018–2020 (12 seasons)
- FC Pokuttia Kolomyia, 1996–1998 (2 seasons)
- FC Naftovyk Dolyna, 1997–2008 (11 seasons)
- FC Enerhetyk Burshtyn, 1998–2012 (14 seasons)
- FC Tekhno-Tsentr Rohatyn, 2000–2005 (5 seasons)
- FC Prykarpattya Ivano-Frankivsk (Fakel Ivano-Frankivsk), 2004–2012 (8 seasons)
- FC Prykarpattia Ivano-Frankivsk (Teplovyk Ivano-Frankivsk), 2016– (9 seasons)
- FC Karpaty Halych, 2020–2021 (a season)
- FC Probiy Horodenka, 2024– (a season)
- FC Revera 1908 Ivano-Frankivsk, 2024– (a season)

== Other clubs at national/republican level ==
Note: the list includes clubs that played at republican competitions before 1959 and the amateur or KFK competitions after 1964.

- Spartak Stanislav, 1946, 1949–1955
- Dynamo Stanislav, 1947–1949
- Medyk Stanislav, 1948
- Stanislav, 1951
- Khimik Kalush, 1956, 1958, 1959, 1964, 1965, 1967, 1968, 1970, 1976, 1977, 1979 – 1983, 1991 – 1994/95, 2017/18
- Avanhard Kolomyia, 1958, 1959
- Avanhard Stanislav, 1958
- Kharchovyk Stanislav, 1959
- Beskyd (Naftovyk/Bystrytsia) Nadvirna, 1965, 1988, 1989, 1992/93, 1994/95, 1998/99
- Naftovyk Dolyna, 1966, 1978 – 1981, 1983 – 1991, 1994/95, 1996/97
- Karpaty Kolomyia, 1969, 2012
- Budivelnyk Kalush, 1971, 1972
- Prylad Ivano-Frankivsk, 1972, 1973
- Elektron Ivano-Frankivsk, 1974 – 1978, 1980, 1981, 1985, 1986
- Silmash/Pokuttia Kolomyia, 1976, 1978, 1984, 1986 1990, 1992/93 – 1995/96, 2017/18 – 2019/20
- imeni Rudnieva Ivano-Frankivsk, 1977
- Karpaty Kuty, 1979 – 1981
- Lokomotyv Ivano-Frankivsk, 1982, 1983
- Mayak Bohorodchany, 1987
- Kolos Kalush, 1987, 1988
- Kolos Holyn, 1989
- Halychyna Kalush, 1990
- Enerhetyk Burshtyn, 1990, 1991, 1997/98
- Halychyna Broshniv, 1991 – 1993/94
- Khutrovyk Tysmenytsia, 1992/93
- Domobudivnyk Burshtyn, 1993/94, 1994/95
- Limnytsia Perehinske, 1993/94, 1994/95
- Probiy Horodenka, 1994/95, 2023/24
- Tekhno-Tsentr Rohatyn, 1998/99 – 2000
- Prykarpattia-Teplovyk (Teplovyk) Ivano-Frankivsk, 2003, 2016, 2021/22
- Karpaty Yaremche, 2004, 2008
- Tsementnyk Yamnytsia, 2006, 2007
- Kniahynyn Pidhaichyky, 2009
- Oskar Pidhiria, 2016/17
- Karpaty Halych, 2018/19, 2019/20
- Varatyk Kolomyia, 2020/21, 2022/23
- Urahan Cherniiv, 2021/22
- FA Prykarpattia Ivano-Frankivsk, 2023/24

== See also ==
- Regional football associations of Ukraine
