= Hryhorii Chychykov =

Ukrainian footballer and manager (1955–2020)

Personal information
- Full name: Hryhorii Hryhorovych Chychykov; Григорій Григорович Чичиков
- Date of birth: January 30, 1955
- Place of birth: Kremenchuk, Ukrainian SSR, Soviet Union (now Ukraine)
- Date of death: September 2020 (aged 65)
- Position: Defender

Senior career*
Years	Team	Apps	(Gls)
1972	KrAZ Kremenchuk		
1976	Dnipro		
1977–1981	Kolos	123	
1981	KrAZ Kremenchuk		
1983	Kooperator		
1983-1985	Naftovyk Kremenchuk		
1986-1987	Kremin Kremenchuk		
1987	Naftovyk Kremenchuk		
1990	Sintez Kremenchuk		
1990	Dorozhnyk Hlobyne		
1993-1996	Vodeiar Kremenchuk	21	

Managerial career
- 1984: Naftovyk Kremenchuk
- 1990: Dorozhnyk Hlobyne
- 1998-1999: FC Adoms Kremenchuk
- 2008-2011: Hirnyk Kremenchuk
- 2015-2016: Vilter
- * Club domestic league appearances and goals

Hryhorii Chychykov (Ukrainian: Григорій Григорович Чичиков; born 30 January 1955 – September 2020) was a Soviet and Ukrainian football and futsal coach and former player who played as a defender. He spent most of his life playing and coaching in Kremenchuk.

== Early life ==
Hryhorii Chychykov was born on 30 January 1955 in Kremenchuk. His first team was "Zoria" a local team led by Yakiv Zilberberg. In 1970 he took part in republican final tournament for leather ball in Kharkiv. His team finished second. He continued to play for youth teams in Kremenchuk.

== Playing career ==
All his life he wanted to be a striker, however Hryhorii played as a defender during his career. In 1974 Chychykov began playing for Burevisnyk Poltava, a team of the student sports society. In their debut year, they finished second in their group in the Poltava Oblast Championship. Two years later, he won the tournament with his team.

=== Kolos ===
Chychykov signed for Kolos in 1977. In his first season, he made five appearances. During the next season, he played in 32 matches. In season 79, Hryhorii played in 45 matches, missing one. During the 80 season, he made 41 appearances. On 25 January 1981, it was reported that Chychykov left Kolos. Kolos manager Volodymyr Aksonov stated that Chychykov had to leave the club due to a rule preventing second league class "A" clubs from having only four player over the age of twenty-five.

=== Kooperator ===
After Kolos seized to exist, the core of its footballers including Hryhorii formed Kooperator. Team won its group in 1983 KFK competition.

=== Kremin ===
Chychykov moved to Kremin in 1986. The team played in 1986 KFK competition among collectives of physical culture. During February, Kremin took part in "Winter-87" tournament, during which Hryhorii was recognized as the best defender of the tournament. Next season Kremin finished second, failing to win promotion to the Soviet Second League.

=== Syntez ===
Hryhorii played for Kremenchuk futsal team Syntez. In 1990 his team participated in Soviet futsal championships. Syntez finished third, and Hryhorii was awarded a medal and a diploma from Soviet football federation.

== Coaching career ==
After his playing career ended, Hryhorii became a youth teams coach. He trained his son Oleksiy Chychykov for six years in Kremenchuk. In 2005 he had 3 football fields in Kremenchuk which were used for training.

Hryhorii became a manager of Naftovyk Kremenchuk in 1984. In 1990 he managed Dorozhnyk from Hlobyne.

=== Adoms ===
Kostiantyn Turkin formed FC Adoms Kremenchuk in the early part of 1999. Hryhorii Chychykov was appointed as the first coach. For its first season the team participated in second round of Poltava Oblast Championship replacing Budivelnyk Shyshaky. They finished 11th out of 13 teams. Matchday announcement flyer ("programmka") by Avanhard Rovenky stated that Adoms only drew with Psel Hadiach and won all their matches, while not conceding any goals. Team also took part in Poltava Oblast cup, where they lost in final against Psel Hadiach. Club began its first season in Ukrainian Second League with a team of mostly local players. Club owners planned on promotion during the first season in the league. However, the team lost its first three matches and was 13th out of 14. This forced the owners to dismiss Hryhorii Chychykov before the match with Avanhard Rovenky held on 22 August 1999. Serhiy Svystun was appointed the new manager before the game. The Avanhard matchday announcement flyer listed Chychykov as a manager.

During 2006, when his son Oleksiy Chychykov joined the Russian side Lokomotiv Moscow, Hryhorii became his agent and personal trainer. Oleksiy later recalled that his father influenced him more than anyone else to move to Lokomotiv.

=== Hirnyk ===
Hryhorii became a manager of amateur and futsal club Hirnyk in Kremenchuk in spring of 2008. During 2008 season team finished third in Poltava Oblast First League. They were also second in Kremenchuk City championship. Next season his team had a very good chance to become champions. They finished level on points with Velyka Bahachka and lost due to goal difference, with both teams conceding 8 goals. Velyka Bahachka scored 50 goals and became champions, Hirnyk scored 49 and finished second. Team also won Kremenchuk City championship and Cup. During winter of 2009–10 season Hirnyk won the Kremenchuk city Futsal First League. For his third season with Hirnyk, Hryhorii led the team to third place in Poltava Oblast First League and second in Kremenchuk City championship. On 25 December 2010 Hirnyk lost a third place match in a Kremenchuk Mayors Cup.

Hirnyk did not take part in Poltava Oblast First League 2011 season. Team took part in futsal championship where they finished third. They did participate in Kremenchuk City championship. Hryhorii was replaced before start of season with Oleksandr Nazarenko who was promoted from managing Hirnyk-2.

=== Vilter ===
During 2015 and 2016 he coached FC Vilter from village Vilna Tereshkivka. On 16 April 2016 Hryhorii along with other coaches was awarded a diploma by Kremenchuk City Council.

== Personal life ==
He is father to Oleksiy Chychykov.

== Legacy ==
During his career Hryhorii trained the following Ukrainian Premier League players: Oleh Chuvayev, Oleh Krasnopyorov and Oleksiy Chychykov.

To honor what Hryhorii did for football in Kremenchuk as a player and coach, a yearly cup for amateur local clubs was started. It is organized by his son Oleksiy Chychykov and Kremenchuk city Football association. First final was held on 25 August 2021. In August and September 2022 second edition of cup was played.

== Sources ==
- Pyrukhin, Yurii, 1971-1982 Вторая лига "Колос" ("Строитель") Полтава Футбол [1971-1982 Second League "Kolos" ("Builder") Poltava Football] (in Russian), Kremenchuk
- Lomov, Anatolii; Kryvorotko, Serhii (2010), Энциклопедия Полтавского Футбола (1909-2010) [Encyclopedia of Poltava Football (1909-2010)] (in Russian), Poltava: OOO "ASMI", ISBN 978-966-182-118-6
- Lomov, Anatolii (2015), "Ворскла" (Полтава) в лицах, событиях, фактах. 1955-2015 ["Vorskla" (Poltava) in faces, events, facts. 1955-2015] (in Russian), Poltava: Dyvosvit, ISBN 978-617-633-116-2
