= 1953 Cup of the Ukrainian SSR =

The 1953 Ukrainian Cup was a football knockout competition conducting by the Football Federation of the Ukrainian SSR and was known as the Ukrainian Cup.

== Teams ==
=== Non-participating teams ===
The Ukrainian teams of masters did not take part in the competition.

- 1953 Soviet Class A (2): FC Dynamo Kyiv, FC Lokomotyv Kharkiv
- 1953 Soviet Class B (4): FC Metalurh Odesa, FC Shakhtar Stalino, FC Metalurh Zaporizhia, FC Metalurh Dnipropetrovsk

== Competition schedule ==
=== First elimination round ===
FC Dynamo Zhytomyr (Rep)	2:1	Pecherskyi District team
FC Lokomotyv Poltava (Rep)	2:1	FC Bilshovyk Kyiv
FC Kharchovyk Smila	3:1	(Rep) FC Torpedo Sumy
FC Dzerzhynets Voroshylovhrad	4:1	FC Lokomotyv Lozova
FC Trud Chernihiv	1:6	(Rep) FC Trud Vinnytsia
FC Dynamo Lviv (Rep)	4:1	(Rep) FC Dynamo Lutsk
FC Dynamo Ternopil (Rep)	0:1	(Rep) FC Dynamo Chernivtsi
FC Avanhard Mykolaiv	1:3	(Rep) FC Torpedo Kirovohrad
FC Naftovyk Drohobych (Rep)	2:2	(Rep) FC Spartak Stanislav	+:– (did not appear for replay)
FC Dynamo Rivno (Rep)	+:–	(Rep) FC Shakhtar Odessa	(did not appear)
FC Spartak Uzhhorod (Rep)	8:0	FC Styah Vynnyky
FC Dynamo Izmail (Rep)	2:1	(Rep) FC Dynamo Proskuriv
FC Metalurh Zhdanov (Rep)	2:0	FC Metalurh Nikopol
FC Torpedo Dnipropetrovsk	5:1	Zaporizhia team
FC Dzerzhynets Kharkiv	3:0	FC Shakhtar Druzhkivka
Odessa team	2:1	(Rep) FC Spartak Kherson

=== Second elimination round ===
FC Torpedo Dnipropetrovsk	4:0	(Rep) FC Metalurh Zhdanov
FC Spartak Uzhhorod (Rep)	4:10	(Rep) FC Dynamo Chernivtsi
FC Lokomotyv Poltava (Rep)	3:0	FC Kharchovyk Smila
FC Torpedo Kirovohrad (Rep)	1:0	Odessa team
FC Dynamo Rivno (Rep)	3:0	(Rep) FC Dynamo Izmail
FC Naftovyk Drohobych (Rep)	2:1	(Rep) FC Dynamo Lviv
FC Trud Vinnytsia (Rep)	0:1	(Rep) FC Dynamo Zhytomyr
FC Dzerzhynets Voroshylovhrad	?:?	FC Dzerzhynets Kharkiv

=== Quarterfinals ===
FC Dynamo Zhytomyr (Rep)	5:1	(Rep) FC Lokomotyv Poltava
FC Torpedo Kirovohrad (Rep)	7:2	(Rep) FC Dynamo Rivno
FC Spartak Uzhhorod (Rep)	4:1	(Rep) FC Naftovyk Drohobych

=== Semifinals ===
FC Torpedo Dnipropetrovsk	2:3	(Rep) FC Lokomotyv Poltava
FC Torpedo Kirovohrad (Rep)	4:3	(Rep) FC Spartak Uzhhorod

=== Final ===
2 August 1953

FC Torpedo Kirovohrad (Rep)	3–1	(Rep) FC Lokomotyv Poltava
Unknown scorer 15'; Unknown scorer ?'; Unknown scorer 21'		Reiznik 38'

Republican Stadium, Kyiv

== Top goalscorers ==
Scorer	Goals	Team
(Ukrainian Soviet Socialist Republic)	?	

Ukrainian Cup 1953 Winners

FC Torpedo Kirovohrad
First title

== See also ==
- Soviet Cup
- Ukrainian Cup

== Sources ==
- Lomov, Anatolii; Stadnychenko, Oleksandr (2009), 100 Років Полтавському Футболу [100 Years of Poltava Football] (in Ukrainian), Poltava: Poltava, ISBN 978-966-97035-0-7
