= 1954 Soviet Class B =

Soviet Class B
- Season: 1954
- Champions: Shakhter Stalino (Final) Spartak Yerevan (Group 1); Zenit Kaliningrad (Group 2); Shakhter Stalino (Group 3)

The 1954 Class B Soviet Football Championship was the 5th season in the Soviet second tier competitions since its reorganization in 1950 and the 14th season since the establishment of the tier in 1936.

FC Shakhter Stalino won the championship by placing 1st in the 6 teams final group and a home turf advantage.

== Teams ==
=== Relegated teams ===
One team was relegated from the 1953 Soviet Class A (top tier).

- Spartak Vilnius – (return after a year absence)

=== Promoted teams ===
- Spartak Uzhgorod – return after a two-year absence, Champion of the 1953 Football Championship of the Ukrainian SSR
- ODO Lvov – return after a four-year absence
- DOF Sevastopol – debut
- Energia Saratov – return after a four-year absence (previously as Dinamo Saratov)
- Neftianik Krasnodar – return after a four-year absence (previously as Dinamo Krasnodar)
- Krylia Sovetov Voronezh – debut, Runner-up of the 1953 Football Championship of the Russian SFSR
- Shakhter Mosbass – debut
- Pischevik Minsk – debut

=== Reinstated teams ===
- ODO Kiev
- ODO Tbilisi
- ODO Sverdlovsk

=== Renamed teams ===
- Dinamo Yerevan → Spartak Yerevan
- Voronezh → Krylia Sovetov Voronezh

== First stage ==
=== Zone I ===
Pos	Rep	Team	Pld	W	D	L	GF	GA	GD	Pts
1	ARM	Spartak Yerevan	22	13	9	0	34	9	+25	35
2	AZE	Neftyanik Baku	22	13	8	1	59	23	+36	34
3	GEO	ODO Tbilisi	22	12	5	5	47	22	+25	29
4	KAZ	Lokomotiv Alma-Ata (Note: Lokomotiv Alma-Ata was called Dinamo)	22	11	7	4	25	13	+12	29
5	TJK	Gornyak Leninabad	22	10	5	7	27	27	0	25
6	RUS	Avangard Chelyabinsk	22	7	7	8	31	37	−6	21
7	RUS	Avangard Sverdlovsk	22	8	5	9	24	30	−6	21
8	TKM	Spartak Ashkhabad	22	6	6	10	22	29	−7	18
9	UZB	Spartak Tashkent	22	4	6	12	17	32	−15	14
10	RUS	ODO Sverdlovsk	22	5	3	14	20	34	−14	13
11	KGZ	Iskra Frunze	22	4	5	13	20	39	−19	13
12	RUS	Krylya Sovetov Molotov	22	5	2	15	16	47	−31	12

Source: rsssf.com

=== Number of teams by republics ===
Number	Union republics	Team(s)
4	Russian SFSR	FC Avangard Chelyabinsk, FC Avangard Sverdlovsk, ODO Sverdlovsk, FC Krylia Sovetov Molotov
1	Armenian SSR	FC Spartak Yerevan
1	Azerbaijan SSR	FC Neftianik Baku
1	Georgian SSR	ODO Tbilisi
1	Kazakh SSR	FC Lokomotiv Alma-Ata
1	Tajik SSR	FC Gornyak Leninabad
1	Turkmen SSR	FC Spartak Asgabat
1	Uzbek SSR	FC Spartak Tashkent
1	Kyrgyz SSR	FC Iskra Frunze

=== Zone II ===
Pos	Rep	Team	Pld	W	D	L	GF	GA	GD	Pts
1	RUS	Zenit Kaliningrad (M.R.)	22	14	5	3	31	14	+17	33
2	LTU	Spartak Vilnius	22	13	6	3	33	13	+20	32
3	RUS	Khimik Moskva	22	12	5	5	36	21	+15	29
4	RUS	Krasnoye Znamya Ivanovo	22	7	10	5	20	15	+5	24
5	RUS	Spartak Kalinin	22	8	8	6	32	27	+5	24
6	BLR	Pishchevik Minsk	22	6	9	7	17	16	+1	21
7	LVA	Daugava Riga	22	9	3	10	20	24	−4	21
8	RUS	Energiya Saratov	22	8	5	9	21	30	−9	21
9	RUS	Krylya Sovetov Voronezh	22	7	3	12	21	29	−8	17
10	RUS	Shakhtyor Mosbass	22	6	3	13	22	31	−9	15
11	EST	Kalev Tallinn	22	6	3	13	18	33	−15	15
12	KAR	Krasnaya Zvezda Petrozavodsk	22	2	8	12	11	29	−18	12

Source: rsssf.com

=== Number of teams by republics ===
Number	Union republics	Team(s)
7	Russian SFSR	FC Zenit Kaliningrad, FC Khimik Moscow, FC Krasnoye Znamya Ivanovo, FC Spartak Kalinin, FC Energia Saratov, FC Krylia Sovetov Voronezh, FC Shakhter Mosbass
1	Lithuanian SSR	FC Spartak Vilnius
1	Belarusian SSR	FC Pischevik Minsk
1	Latvian SSR	FC Daugava Riga
1	Estonian SSR	FC Kalev Tallinn
1	Karelo-Finnish SSR	FC Krasnaya Zvezda Petrozavodsk

=== Zone III ===
Pos	Rep	Team	Pld	W	D	L	GF	GA	GD	Pts
1	UKR	Shakhtyor Stalino	22	17	4	1	56	16	+40	38
2	RUS	Torpedo Rostov-na-Donu	22	11	7	4	35	20	+15	29
3	UKR	Metallurg Zaporozhye	22	11	5	6	34	24	+10	27
4	UKR	Metallurg Dnepropetrovsk	22	8	9	5	30	27	+3	25
5	UKR	Spartak Uzhgorod	22	9	5	8	37	35	+2	23
6	UKR	Metallurg Odessa	22	8	4	10	37	42	−5	20
7	UKR	ODO Lvov	22	7	6	9	24	32	−8	20
8	RUS	Torpedo Stalingrad	22	7	5	10	31	39	−8	19
9	UKR	DOF Sevastopol	22	5	8	9	19	31	−12	18
10	RUS	Neftyanik Krasnodar	22	6	5	11	29	41	−12	17
11	UKR	ODO Kiev	22	6	4	12	34	45	−11	16
12	MDA	Burevestnik Kishinev	22	2	8	12	26	40	−14	12

Source: rsssf.com

=== Number of teams by republics ===
Number	Union republics	Team(s)
8	Ukrainian SSR	FC Shakhter Stalino, FC Metallurg Zaporozhye, FC Metallurg Dnepropetrovsk, FC Spartak Uzhgorod, FC Metallurg Odessa, ODO Lvov, DOF Sevastopol, ODO Kiev
3	Russian SFSR	FC Torpedo Rostov-na-Donu, FC Torpedo Stalingrad, FC Neftianik Krasnodar
1	Moldavian SSR	FC Burevestnik Kishinev

== Final stage ==
Pos	Rep	Team	Pld	W	D	L	GF	GA	GD	Pts	Promotion
1	UKR	Shakhtyor Stalino	5	4	1	0	10	1	+9	9	Promoted
2	LTU	Spartak Vilnius	5	2	3	0	4	2	+2	7	
3	AZE	Neftyanik Baku	5	2	1	2	7	7	0	5	
4	RUS	Zenit Kaliningrad (M.R.)	5	2	1	2	4	5	−1	5	
5	ARM	Spartak Yerevan	5	0	2	3	3	7	−4	2	
6	RUS	Torpedo Rostov-na-Donu	5	0	2	3	3	9	−6	2	

Source: rsssf.com
Notes:

Played in Stalino

== See also ==
- 1954 Soviet Class A
- 1954 Soviet Cup
