= 2000–01 Ukrainian Second League Cup =

Tournament details
- Country: Ukraine

Final positions
- Champions: Polissya Zhytomyr
- Runners-up: Tytan Armyansk

The Ukrainian Second League Cup 2000–01 was the second edition of Second League Cup competition designated exclusively for clubs of the Second League. It was organized as a qualification tournament for the Ukrainian Cup with only the finalist advancing to the national cup competition.

The Cup started with a qualification round on July 29, 2000 and consisted of 12 pairs. The previous year's winner Borysfen Boryspil did not compete, while the finalist Kherson was eliminated in the qualification round by Tytan Armyansk. Unlike the previous year's edition all rounds consisted of a single match. The first round started on August 6. The best four teams qualified for the main event and later continued with this tournament from the semi-final stage. In the Ukrainian Cup the qualified teams Sokil and Polissya managed to make it to the second round, while Mashynobudivnyk was eliminated in the first. Tytan chose not to participate in the main event.

The quarter finals of this competition were played in August 2000, the Cup was resumed only in May of the next year. The final game took place at the CSKA Stadium in Kyiv where Polissya ran over Tytan, figuratively speaking, earning itself the first trophy of the competition. This was the last edition of the Cup. It also was the last season for the second and third teams in cup competitions. Later in 2009-10 a similar tournament was organized for the Second League clubs called The League Cup where junior teams of the First League clubs and amateur clubs were allowed as well.

== Competition schedule ==
=== Qualification round ===
Portovyk Illichivsk	0:2	Olimpiya AES Yuzhnoukrainsk
Desna Chernihiv	3:1	Ryhonda Bila Tserkva
Karpaty-2 Lviv	2:1	Halychyna Drohobych
SC Kherson	0:1	Tytan Armyansk
Ternopil Nyva-2	0:3	Krasyliv	in Velyki Hai
Prykarpattia-2 Ivano-Frankivsk	0:0	Techno-Center Rohatyn	aet, pk 4:2
Stal-2 Alchevsk	1:0	Avanhard Rovenky
Cherkasy-2	2:1	Hirnyk-Sport Komsomolsk
Dnipro-3 Dnipropetrovsk	1:2	Frunzenets Liha-99 Sumy	in Novomoskovsk
Metalurh-2 Zaporizhzhia	3:1	Olkom Melitopol
Sokil Zolochiv	4:0	Kalush
Dynamo-3 Kyiv	+:–	Veres Rivne	Veres forfeited this tournament as in the last season

=== First round (of 32) ===
Olimpiya AES Yuzhnoukrainsk	2:0	Chornomorets-2 Odesa
Sokil Zolochiv	1:0	Hazovyk Komarne
Mashbud Druzhkivka	2:0	Metalurh-2 Mariupol
Enerhetyk Burshtyn	5:0	Dynamo Lviv
Metalurh-2 Zaporizhzhia	1:0	Torpedo Zaporizhzhia
Prykarpattia-2 Ivano-Frankivsk	1:5	Polissya Zhytomyr
Zoria Luhansk	6:2	Stal-2 Alchevsk
Tytan Armyansk	3:1	Kryvbas-2 Kryvyi Rih
Shakhtar-3 Donetsk	2:0	Metalist-2 Kharkiv
Vorskla-2 Poltava	0:2	Arsenal Kharkiv
Desna Chernihiv	1:1	Obolon-PVO Kyiv	aet, pk 5:6
Krasyliv	2:3	Naftovyk Dolyna
Dynamo-3 Kyiv	1:1	Systema-Boreks Borodianka	aet, pk 2:3
Cementnyk-Khorda Mykolaiv	1:0	Karpaty-2 Lviv
Frunzenets Liha-99 Sumy	2:1	Oskil Kupyansk
Adoms Kremenchuk	2:0	Cherkasy-2

=== Second Round (of 16) ===
Naftovyk Dolyna	1:2	Sokil Zolochiv
Mashbud Druzhkivka	4:1	Zoria Luhansk
Metalurh-2 Zaporizhzhia	2:1	Olimpiya AES Yuzhnoukrainsk
Systema-Boreks Borodianka	0:1	Polissya Zhytomyr
Arsenal Kharkiv	1:0	Shakhtar-3 Donetsk	aet
Obolon-PVO Kyiv	2:0	Adoms Kremenchuk
Cementnyk-Khorda Mykolaiv	0:1	Enerhetyk Burshtyn
Frunzenets Liha-99 Sumy	0:2	Tytan Armyansk

=== Quarterfinals (1/4) ===
Mashbud Druzhkivka	3:2	Arsenal Kharkiv	aet
Tytan Armyansk	1:0	Metalurh-2 Zaporizhzhia
Polissya Zhytomyr	4:0	Obolon-PVO Kyiv
Sokil Zolochiv	1:0	Enerhetyk Burshtyn

=== Semifinals (1/2) ===
Tytan Armyansk	3:0	Mashbud Druzhkivka
Sokil Zolochiv	0:2	Polissya Zhytomyr

=== Final ===
The final was held at the CSKA Stadium on May 9, 2001 in Kyiv.

Polissya Zhytomyr	4:0	Tytan Armyansk

== Top goalscorers ==
Scorer	Goals	Team
(Ukraine)	?	

Ukrainian Second League Cup 2000-01 Winners

FC Polissya Zhytomyr
First title

== See also ==
- Ukrainian Cup 2000-01
- Ukrainian Second League 2000–01
