= 1999–2000 Ukrainian Cup =

1999—2000 Ukrainian Cup
Kubok Ukrainy

Tournament details
- Country: Ukraine
- Dates: 11 March – 27 May 2000
- Teams: 32

Final positions
- Champions: Dynamo Kyiv (5th title)
- Runners-up: Kryvbas Kryvyi Rih

Tournament statistics
- Top goal scorer: Maksim Shatskikh (4)

The 1999–2000 Ukrainian Cup was the ninth annual edition of Ukraine's football knockout competition, known as the Ukrainian Cup. The winner of this competition was Dynamo Kyiv, beating FC Kryvbas Kryvyi Rih in the final.

The format of competition was completely changed. The competition itself started on March 11, 2000 with 32 teams: 16 from the Premier League, 14 from the First League, and both finalists of the Second League cup. The Second League Cup took place in the late 1999 involving some 44 teams out which two finalists qualified for the Ukrainian Cup. Those finalists later also played a final game for the competition's trophy in May 2000.

== Round and draw dates ==
All draws held at FFU headquarters (Building of Football) in Kyiv unless stated otherwise.

Round	Draw date	Game date
Round of 32	?	11 March 2000
Round of 16	?	29–30 March 2000
Quarter-finals	?	12 April 2000
Semi-finals	?	10 May 2000
Final	27 May 2000 at NSC "Olimpiyskiy", Kyiv	

== Competition schedule ==
=== First round ===
Torpedo Zaporizhzhia	– : +	Dynamo Kyiv	Torpedo withdrew
Kherson	1 – 0	Chornomorets Odesa
Stal Alchevsk	0 – 2	CSKA Kyiv	played in Stakhanov
Zakarpattia Uzhhorod	1 – 2	Metalurh Donetsk	played on snow
Polissya Zhytomyr	2 – 5	Vorskla Poltava
Polihraftekhnika Oleksandriya	0 – 1	Kryvbas Kryvyi Rih
FC Lviv	4 – 0	Metalurh Mariupol	played on Yunist Stadium in Lviv
Metalurh Nikopol	1 – 1	Zirka Kirovohrad	penalty kicks 1:3
Volyn Lutsk	1 – 3	Dnipro Dnipropetrovsk
SC Mykolaiv	1 – 2	Shakhtar Donetsk
Yavir-Sumy	1 – 2	Tavriya Simferopol	played in Krasnopillya
FC Vinnytsia	2 – 2	Metalist Kharkiv	penalty kicks 4:2
Obolon Kyiv	0 – 1	Nyva Ternopil	played in Nova Kakhovka
Borysfen Boryspil	0 – 0	Prykarpattia Ivano-Frankivsk	penalty kicks 3:1
FC Cherkasy	1 – 2	Karpaty Lviv
Naftovyk Okhtyrka	0 – 2	Metalurh Zaporizhzhia

=== Second round ===
CSKA Kyiv	2 – 1	Vorskla Poltava	played on Olympic Stadium in Kyiv
Dynamo Kyiv	4 – 0	Kherson	played at the Dynamo's training grounds (Koncha-Zaspa) in Kyiv
Metalurh Donetsk	2 – 3	Kryvbas Kryvyi Rih	played in Druzhkivka
FC Nyva Ternopil	1 – 2	Karpaty Lviv	in extra time
Metalurh Zaporizhzhia	3 – 0	Tavriya Simferopol
Shakhtar Donetsk	5 – 0	Borysfen Boryspil	played on Avanhard Stadium in Makiivka
Zirka Kirovohrad	2 – 0	FC Vinnytsia
FC Lviv	1 – 0	Dnipro Dnipropetrovsk	played on Yunist Stadium in Lviv

=== Quarterfinals ===
Metalurh Zaporizhzhia	3 – 0	Karpaty Lviv
Zirka Kirovohrad	0 – 0	Shakhtar Donetsk	penalty kicks 6:5
FC Lviv	1 – 4	Dynamo Kyiv	played on Ukraina Stadium in Lviv
Kryvbas Kryvyi Rih	1 – 0	CSKA Kyiv

=== Semifinals ===
Dynamo Kyiv	6 – 1	Metalurh Zaporizhzhia	played on Dynamo Stadium in Kyiv
Kryvbas Kryvyi Rih	2 – 1	Zirka Kirovohrad

10 May 2000
18:00 LST

Dynamo Kyiv (PL)	6–1	(PL) Metalurh Zaporizhzhia
Rebrov 9'; Shatskikh 18', 89'; Byalkevich 60'; Demetradze 66' (pen.), 82'	Report	Smirnov 61'

Dynamo Stadium, Kyiv
Attendance: 10,000
Referee: Anatoliy Zhosan
10 May 2000
19:00 LST

Kryvbas Kryvyi Rih (PL)	2–1	(PL) Zirka Kirovohrad
Hetsko 44'; Palianytsia 59'	Report	Kyslov 24'; Kudinov (yellow card) 58' (yellow-red card) 67'

Metalurh Stadium, Kryvyi Rih
Attendance: 22,000
Referee: Serhiy Tatulyan

=== Final ===
27 May 2000
17:00 LST

Dynamo Kyiv (PL)	1–0	(PL) Kryvbas Kryvyi Rih
Khatskevich 44'	Report

NSC Olimpiyskiy, Kyiv
Attendance: 45,500
Referee: Valeriy Onufer

== See also ==
- 1999–2000 Ukrainian Second League Cup
