= 1999–2000 Ukrainian Second League Cup =

1999–00 Ukrainian Second League Cup
Tournament details
- Country: Ukraine

Final positions
- Champions: Borysfen Boryspil
- Runners-up: Krystal Kherson

The Ukrainian Second League Cup 1999–00 was the first edition of Second League Cup competition designated exclusively for clubs of the Second League. It was organized as a qualification tournament for the Ukrainian Cup with only the finalist advancing to the national cup competition.

The Cup started with a qualification round on August 18, 1999, and consisted of 11 pairs. The winner of that round was identified by a single game and advancing to the first round of competition. The first round started on September 1. From the first round and all the way to the final teams played a home-away elimination type tournament. The best two teams faced off after qualifying for the main event. Both Borysfen and Kherson were eliminated in the second round of the Ukrainian Cup with a big margin on March 29, 2000. Later they met each other for the final of the Second League Cup on May 6, 2000, although the last semifinal game of that tournament took place on November 16, 1999. In the final that took place at the Dinamo Stadium in Kyiv Borysfen beat Kherson earning itself the first trophy of the competition.

== Competition schedule ==
=== Qualification round ===
Karpaty-2 (Lviv)	0:1	Dynamo (Lviv)	in Yavoriv
Nyva (Vinnytsia)	+:–	Veres (Rivne)	Veres did not appear
Enerhetyk (Burshtyn)	1:0	Kalush
Halychyna (Drohobych)	1:0	Prykarpattia-2
Ryhonda (Bila Tserkva)	0:0	Obolon-PVO-2 (Kyiv)	aet, pk 3:1
Zirka-2 (Kirovohrad)	0:1	Olimpiya AES
Tytan (Armyansk)	+:–	Chornomorets (Sevastopol)	Chornomorets quit
Viktor (Zaporizhzhia)	4:1	Torpedo (Melitopol)
Metalurh-2 (Zaporizhzhia)	–:+	Dnipro-2 (Dnipropetrovsk)	Metalurh Zaporizhzhia decided not to field its second team
Arsenal (Kharkiv)	1:0	Mashbud (Druzhkivka)
Adoms (Kremenchuk)	5:1	Myrhorod	aet
Shakhtar (Horlivka)	2:0	Avanhard (Rovenky)	aet

=== First round (of 32) ===
Team 1	Agg.	Team 2	1st leg	2nd leg
FC Portovyk Illichivsk	w/o	FC Tytan Armyansk	–:+	w/d
FC Podillya Khmelnytskyi	7–4	FC Tsementnyk-Khorda Mykolaiv	3–2	4–2
FC Hazovyk Komarno	1–1 (a)	FC Dynamo Lviv	1–1	0–0
FC Nyva Vinnytsia	1–2	FC Papirnyk Malyn	0–0	1–2
FC Enerhetyk Burshtyn	2–3	FC Bukovyna Chernivtsi	2–2	0–1
FC Naftovyk Dolyna	3–2	FC Halychyna Drohobych	3–2	0–0
FC Systema-Boreks Borodianka	2–1	FC Ryhonda Bila Tserkva	1–1	1–0
Olimpia FC AES Yuzhnoukrainsk	w/o	FC Borysfen Boryspil	0–5	w/d
FC Desna Chernihiv	2–5	FC Dynamo-3 Kyiv	2–4	0–1
FC Vorskla-2 Poltava	1–5	FC Hirnyk-Sport Komsomolsk	0–3	1–2
FC Krystal Kherson	6–1	FC Viktor Zaporizhzhia	4–1	2–0
FC Dnipro-2 Dnipropetrovsk	3–2	FC Kryvbas-2 Kryvyi Rih	1–1	2–1
FC Elektron Romny	w/o	FC Arsenal Kharkiv	2–0	w/d
FC Kremin Kremenchuk	3–1	FC Adoms Kremenchuk	2–1	1–0
FC Shakhtar Horlivka	1–3	FC Zorya Luhansk	0–0	1–3
FC Oskil Kupyansk	0–3	FC Metalist-2 Kharkiv	0–1	0–2

=== Second round (of 16) ===
Team 1	Agg.	Team 2	1st leg	2nd leg
FC Dynamo Lviv	1–1 (a)	FC Podillya Khmelnytskyi	1–1	0–0
FC Papirnyk Malyn	3–5	FC Bukovyna Chernivtsi	3–2	0–3
FC Systema-Boreks Borodianka	0–3	FC Naftovyk Dolyna	0–0	0–3
FC Borysfen Boryspil	6–0	FC Dynamo-3 Kyiv	4–0	2–0
FC Tytan Armyansk	2–2 (a)	FC Hirnyk-Sport Komsomolsk	1–2	1–0
FC Dnipro-2 Dnipropetrovsk	1–1 (a)	FC Krystal Kherson	1–1	0–0
FC Arsenal Kharkiv	2–1	FC Kremin Kremenchuk	1–0	1–1
FC Zorya Luhansk	2–2 (a)	FC Metalist-2 Kharkiv	2–2	0–0

=== Quarterfinals (1/4) ===
Team 1	Agg.	Team 2	1st leg	2nd leg
FC Podillya Khmelnytskyi	5–3	FC Bukovyna Chernivtsi	2–0	3–3
FC Borysfen Boryspil	7–1	FC Naftovyk Dolyna	2–0	5–1
FC Krystal Kherson	2–1	FC Hirnyk-Sport Komsomolsk	1–1	1–0
FC Metalist-2 Kharkiv	2–1	FC Arsenal Kharkiv	1–0	1–1

=== Semifinals (1/2) ===
Team 1	Agg.	Team 2	1st leg	2nd leg
FC Borysfen Boryspil	6–2	FC Podillya Khmelnytskyi	2–0	4–2 (a.e.t.)
FC Metalist-2 Kharkiv	0–2	FC Krystal Kherson	0–1	0–1

=== Final ===
The final was held at the Dynamo Stadium on May 6, 2000, in Kyiv.

FC Borysfen Boryspil	2:0; Report	SC Kherson

== Top goalscorers ==
Scorer	Goals	Team
(Ukraine)	?	

Ukrainian Second League Cup 1999-00 Winners

FC Borysfen Boryspil
First title

== See also ==
- Ukrainian Cup 1999-2000
