= FC Adoms Kremenchuk =

Former Ukrainian football club from Kremenchuk, Ukraine

Adoms
- Full name: Football Club Adoms Kremenchuk
- Founded: 1999
- Dissolved: 2001
- Ground: Polytechnic, Kremenchuk
- Capacity: 12,000
- President: Ivan Drobot
- Head coach: Serhiy Svystun
- Final season; 2000–01: 14th (Withdrawn)

FC ADOMS Kremenchuk was a Ukrainian football club formed in Kremenchuk, Poltava Oblast in 1999 and based at Polytechnic Stadium from 1998 to 2001. Team competed in two seasons of Ukrainian Second League before dissolving in 2001.

== History ==
The club was formed in early part of 1999 by owner a local company "Adoms" Kostiantyn Turkin and Dmytro Oleksiinko. Turkin became the club's first President. Hryhoriy Chychykov was appointed as first coach. Club colors were blue and white. For its first season the team participated in second round of Poltava Oblast Championship replacing Budivelnyk Shyshaky. They finished 11th out of 13 teams. Matchday programme by Avanhard Rovenky stated that Adoms only drew with Psel Hadiach and won all their matches, while not conceding any goals. Season table showed them conceding 1 goal and scoring 32 in 12 matches. Oleksandr Solnyshkin was the top goalscorer with 10 goals. Team also took part in Poltava Oblast cup, where they lost in final against Psel Hadiach.

Club began its first season in Ukrainian Second League with a team of mostly local players. Club owners planned on promotion during first season in the league. However the team lost its first three matches and was 13th out of 14 teams. This forced the owners to dismiss Hryhoriy Chychykov before the match with Avanhard Rovenky held on 22 August 1999. Serhiy Svystun was appointed a new manager before the game. Avanhard matchday programme listed Chychykov as a manager. This had a positive effect on team who went on a six match winning streak. With few games remaining Adoms was top of the league. For the important match Dnipro-2 was reinforced with players from first team, and won promotion to First league, with Adoms finishing second. The team's top goalscorer was Oleh Krasnopyorov with 9 goals in 23 matches. Club President Kostiantyn Turkin also made 2 appearances as a substitute, playing for 12 minutes in league and cup. Serhiy Svystun before becoming a manager also played for Adoms in one match against FC Arsenal Kharkiv on 8 August 1999. In April 2000 first vice-mayor of Kremenchuk Anatolii Byshenko was charged with corruption for giving Adoms clause of the contract that guaranteed them certain benefits.

During second season, club faced financial difficulties due to its owners overestimating its abilities. During winter break main footballers left club, which left team battling for relegation. Also towards the end of season Club President Kostiantyn Turkin was replaced with Ivan Drobot. Team finished the season 14th.

2001–02 Ukrainian Cup scheduled match against Spartak Sumy was given as a walkover for Spartak.

On 28 March 2003 Ukrainian government sanctioned "Newport Management LTD" of British Virgin Islands for not paying $100,000 to Adoms. Those sanctions were lifted on 12 May 2003. On 23 October 2003, the Kremenchuk city council created a city football team MFC Kremin Kremenchuk. Players from Adoms and another local team Atlant became its main players. Dmytro Oleksiinko became its first President. Serhiy Svystun was appointed its manager.

== Stadium ==
The team played at the Polytechnic Stadium all their Second League home games sharing the ground with FC Kremin Kremenchuk.

Other smaller stadiums in Kremenchuk were also used by the club. Such as Professional technical school #16 and #22, Dormash and Kredmash stadiums. They were used during the Poltava Oblast Championship, Cup and Kremenchuk City Cup

== Rivalries ==
During 1999–00 season Adoms played with city rivals 4 times. Team won two league matches 2:0 and 4:0 and lost two Second League Cup matches 1:2 and 0:1.

== Managers ==
- (Ukraine) Hryhorii Chychykov (14 March 1999 – 14 August 1999)
- (Ukraine) Andriy Nediak (14 August 1999 – 27 August 1999)
- (Ukraine) Serhiy Svystun (27 August 1999 – 24 June 2001)

== League and cup history ==
Season	Div.	Pos.	Pl.	W	D	L	GS	GA	P	Second League Cup	Notes
1998–99	Regional	11	12	11	1	0	32	1	35	Runner-up (Note: Poltava Oblast Cup)	Poltava Oblast Championship and Cup
1999–00	3rd "C"	2	26	18	1	7	44	22	55	1/32 finals	
2000–01	3rd "C"	14	30	7	7	16	24	38	28	1/16 finals	Withdrawn

== Honours ==
Ukrainian Second League

Runners-up (1): 1999–2000 (Group C)

Poltava Oblast Cup

Runners-up (1): 1999

Kremenchuk City Cup

Winners (1): 1999
