= Berezhna =

Berezhna (Ukrainian: Бережна) is a Ukrainian surname. It is the feminine form of Berezhnyi (Ukrainian: Бережний). Notable people with the surname include:

- Milena Berezhna (born 2008), young Ukrainian artist
- Alina Berezhna (born 1991), Ukrainian wrestler
- Irina Berezhna (1980–2017), Ukrainian politician
- Larysa Berezhna (born 1961), Ukrainian long jumper
- Tetyana Berezhna (born 1982), Ukrainian archer
- Yana Berezhna (born 1997), Ukrainian Paralympic swimmer
- Zoya Berezhna (born 1967), Ukrainian politician

== See also ==
- Oleksandr Berezhnyi (1957–2025), Soviet-Ukrainian football player
- Viktor Berezhniy (or Viktor Berezhnyi ?) (born 1961), Ukrainian basketball player
