= Ukrainian Second League Cup =

- Founded: 1999; 27 years ago
- Abolished: 2001; 25 years ago
- Region: Ukraine
- Website: Football Federation of Ukraine

The Ukrainian Second League Cup (Ukrainian: Кубок Ліги) was a knockout cup competition in Ukrainian football, run by the Professional Football League of Ukraine.

Created in 1999 to qualify its winner and finalist for the national cup (Ukrainian Cup), after the 2000-01 season it was discontinued.

== Format ==
The format of this competition fluctuated insignificantly. It consisted of a qualification round that was followed by the first round, 1/16 of final. Initially all rounds from the first to semi-finals consisted of two games, home-away basis, later it changed with only one game played from the randomly chosen field of the participated clubs. Mainly the competition was limited to clubs that were competing in the Second League. Also later semifinalists were allowed to enter the Ukrainian Cup also. The winner and runner-up of the competition were awarded a qualification to the Ukrainian Cup in 2000 and 2001.

== History ==
The competition with name Cup of the Second League began in 1999/2000 season by the PFL, but after the second season 2000/2001 decided to abandon them. The competition was discontinued as it showed to be lacking the true strive for victory from the clubs that participated. It was lacking popularization and was also considered to be more costly as almost no spectators were attending the games of that competition.

== Finals ==
Year	Venue	Winner	Score	Runner-up
1999–00	Dynamo Stadium, Kyiv	Borysfen Boryspil	2 – 0	SC Kherson
2000–01	CSK ZSU Stadium, Kyiv	Polissya Zhytomyr	4 – 0	Tytan Armyansk

== Performance by club ==
Club	Winners	Runner-up	Semifinalists	Winning years
Borysfen Boryspil	1	0	0	1999–00
Polissya Zhytomyr	1	0	0	2000–01
Kherson	0	1	0	
Tytan Armyansk	0	1	0	
Podillya Khmelnytskyi	0	0	1	
Metalist-2 Kharkiv	0	0	1	
Sokil Zolochiv	0	0	1	
Mashbud Druzhkivka	0	0	1	
Myr Hornostayivka	0	0	1	
Illichivets-2 Mariupol	0	0	1	

== See also ==
- Football in Ukraine
- Ukrainian Premier League
