= Serhii Svystun =

Ukrainian footballer (born 1962)

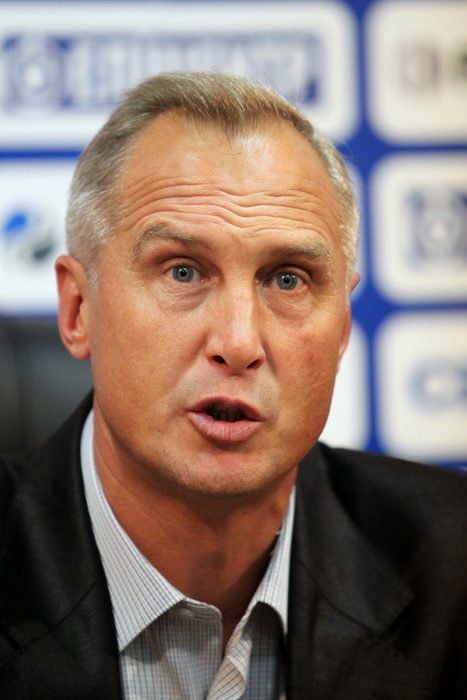
- Svystun in 2012

Personal information
- Full name: Serhii Volodymyrovych Svystun
- Date of birth: 14 March 1962 (age 64)
- Place of birth: Dushanbe, Soviet Union
- Height: 1.72 m (5 ft 8 in)
- Position: Forward

Senior career*
Years	Team	Apps	(Gls)
1980–1985	Metalist Kharkiv	28	(3)
1982	→ Mayak Kharkiv (loan)	45	(4)
1986	SKA Kyiv	35	(14)
1987–1990	Shakhtar Donetsk	61	(7)
1990–1991	Lokomotiv Nizhny Novgorod	19	(1)
1990	Pryladyst Mukacheve	4	(2)
1991–1993	Diósgyőri VTK	69	(14)
1993–1994	Nyíregyháza Spartacus	27	(7)
1994–1996	Naftokhimik Kremenchuk	74	(10)
1996–1998	Avanhard-Industriya Rovenky	45	(9)
1998–2000	Hirnyk-Sport Komsomolsk	36	(10)
1998	→ Kremin Kremenchuk (loan)	5	(1)
1999	Adoms Kremenchuk	1	(0)

Managerial career
- 1999–2001: Adoms Kremenchuk
- 2002–2004: Atlant Kremenchuk
- 2004–2008: Kremin Kremenchuk
- 2012–2013: Vorskla Poltava (interim)
- 2013–2015: Kremin Kremenchuk
- 2020: Kremin Kremenchuk
- * Club domestic league appearances and goals

Serhii Svystun (Ukrainian: Сергій Володимирович Свистун; born 14 March 1962) is a Ukrainian football coach and former professional player who played as a forward.

== Early life ==
Serhii Svystun was born on 14 March 1962 in Dushanbe. He began his football education in a Kremenchuk youth football school. His first coach was Yevhen Leontovych. He received his higher education at the Kharkiv State Academy of Physical Culture in 1985.

== Playing career ==
Svystun began laying professionally in 1980 for Metalist Kharkiv and Maiak Kharkiv. later he moved on to SKA Kyiv. From 1987 to 89 Svystun made sixty one appearance and scored ten goals for Shakhtar Donetsk. Next year he spent at Lokomotiv Nizhny Novgorod. In 1990 he spent a short time with Pryladyst Mukacheve before moving to Hungary. During the next four years Svystun played for First and Second League clubs Diósgyőri VTK and Nyíregyháza Spartacus. He returned to Kremenchuk to play for Naftokhimik Kremenchuk. During the 1994–96 seasons he featured in seventy-four matches scoring ten goals. Next season he moved on to Avanhard-Industriya Rovenky, then to Hirnyk-Sport Komsomolsk. During the first half of the 1998–99 season he played five matches on loan to Kremin Kremenchuk and scored one goal. Next season he began with Adoms Kremenchuk. He finished his playing career in 1999 and moved on to coaching.

== Coaching career ==
Svystun was manager of Adoms Kremenchuk, Atlant Kremenchuk. Svystyn joined Kremin Kremenchuk in 2003. The team played in Poltava oblast championship. When team was promoted to Second league, he had to build a new squad. He managed Kremin until 31 October 2008. He then became joined Vorskla Poltava where he was a coach of the reserve team in 2009. From 15 August 2012 to 10 June 2013 he was an interim manager of Vorskla. During the 2013-14 season, he returned to manage Kremin. After he was replaced with Serhiy Yashchenko in 2015, Svystun remained in the club as an assistant. On 10 February 2020 he was appointed as a manager of Kremin for the third time.

== Honours ==
=== Manager ===
Kremin

- Poltava Oblast Championship: 2003–04, 2004–05
- Poltava Oblast Cup: 2003–04

== Sources ==
- Lomov, Anatolii; Kryvorotko, Serhii (2010), Энциклопедия Полтавского Футбола (1909-2010) [Encyclopedia of Poltava Football (1909-2010)] (in Russian), Poltava: OOO "ASMI", ISBN 978-966-182-118-6
