= FC Burevisnyk Poltava =

Defunct football club based in Poltava, Ukraine

Burevisnyk Poltava
- Founded: 1973
- Dissolved: 1984
- Ground: Poltava

The Burevisnyk Poltava (Ukrainian: ФК Буревісник Полтава) was a Ukrainian Soviet football team based in Poltava, Ukraine. It was a local organizational cell of the All-Union Burevisnyk sports society and represented the Poltava Institute of Cooperation (today Poltava University of Economics and Trade).

== History ==
Anatolii Shtryhol began working in the physical education section of Poltava Institute of Cooperation at the end of 1972. Almost immediately, he began to form a football club. In 1973, the club won bronze medals in the Ukrainian University football competition. The students' sports society's club made its debut in the 1974 Poltava Oblast Championship season. Most of the players came from the Poltava Institute of Cooperation, reinforced by veteran players. The club finished in second place and won silver medals. In April 1975, the club participated in a six-club tournament "Podsnezhnik" (Snowdrop), where they finished third. In the championship, the club won its first trophy. Burevisnyk retained the trophy during 1976. During 1977, the club lost on penalties to Suputnyk in the final of the nine-club tournament "Podsnezhnik". In the cup, Burevisnyk lost in the final to Promin. They also lost in extra time to Promin in the Poltava city cup. The club took part in 1977 KFK competition where they finished fourth in their group. During 1978, Burevisnyk reached the cup final on 30 June in 1978 KFK competition where they finished sixth. In 1979, Burevisnyk took part in the Ukrainian University football competition, where they lost in the final to RVUFK (Kyiv State Institute of Physical Education). In 1980, they lost to the same team in the final played in Chernivtsi. In the next years, the club only played in University competitions. In August 1982 Shtrykol transferred the club under Kolos sports society. When Vorskla Poltava then Kolos folded in 1982, the leadership of the university and Kolos sports society decided to restore the Kolos football team. On 29 December, a decision was made to take part in 1983 KFK competition. The club won their group and advanced to the final part, where they finished last. Next season the team became Vorskla Poltava.

== Name change ==
- Burevisnyk Poltava (1973–1982)
- Kooperator Poltava (1983)

== Honours ==
Poltava Oblast Championship

Winners (2): 1975, 1976
Runners-up (2): 1974

Poltava Oblast Cup

Winners (1): 1978
Runners-up (1): 1977

Poltava Cup

Runners-up (1): 1977

== Sources ==
- Lomov, Anatolii; Stadnychenko, Oleksandr (2009), 100 Років Полтавському Футболу [100 Years of Poltava Football] (in Ukrainian), Poltava: Poltava, ISBN 978-966-97035-0-7
- Lomov, Anatolii; Kryvorotko, Serhii (2010), Энциклопедия Полтавского Футбола (1909-2010) [Encyclopedia of Poltava Football (1909-2010)] (in Russian), Poltava: OOO "ASMI", ISBN 978-966-182-118-6
- Lomov, Anatolii (2019), Полтавщина спортивна в обличчях і фактах. [Sport in Poltava region in faces and facts.] (in Ukrainian), Poltava: PP Dyvosvit, ISBN 978-617-633-252-7
