= Volodymyr Mykolaienko =

Ukrainian politician

- Володимир Миколаєнко
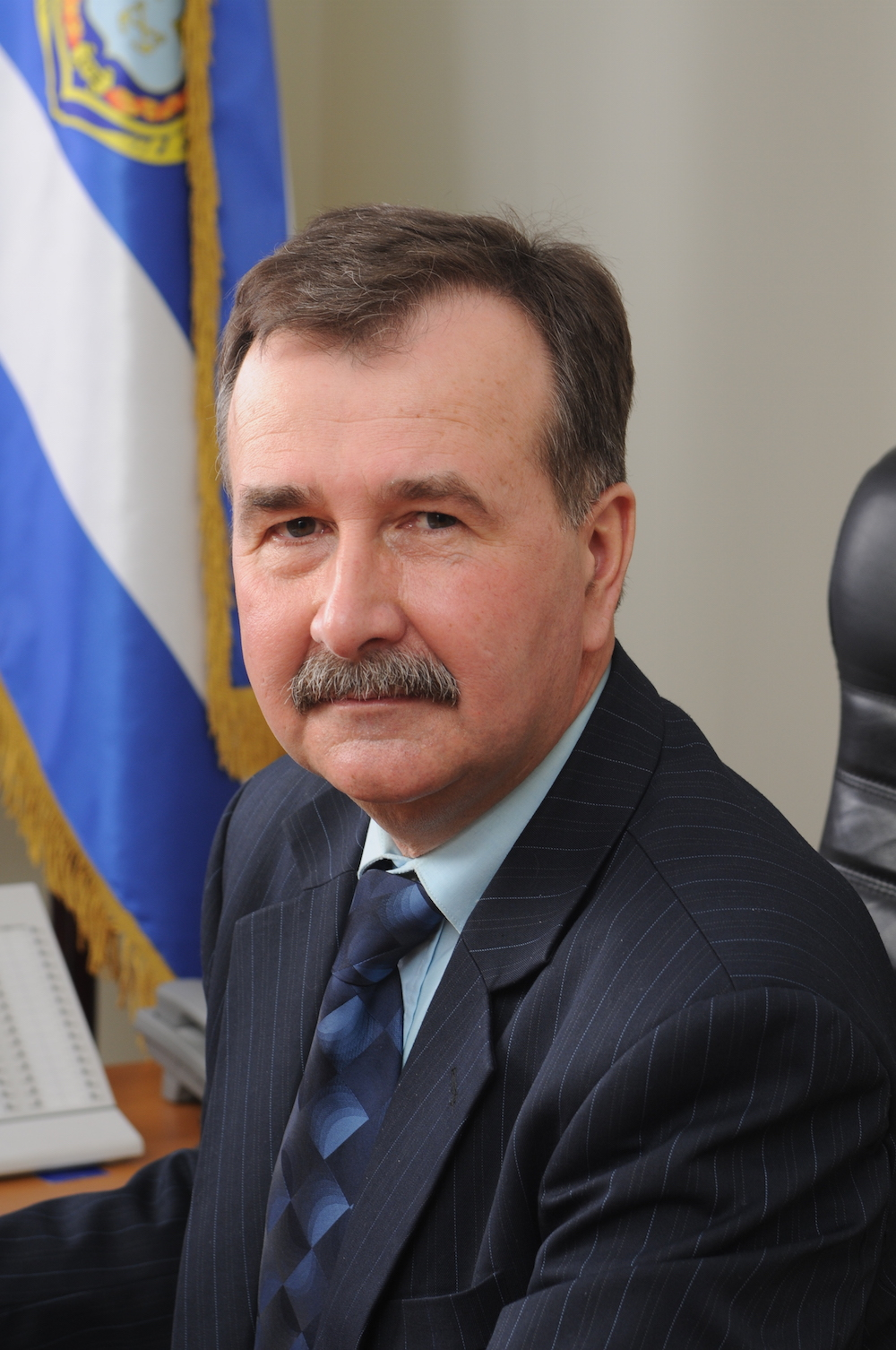
- Mykolaienko in 2014

Mayor of Kherson
- In office 25 May 2014 – 27 November 2020
- Preceded by: Zoya Berezhna (acting)
- Succeeded by: Ihor Kolykhaiev

Member of the Kherson City Council
- In office June 2006 – 25 May 2014

Personal details
- Born: 8 April 1960 (age 66) Kherson, Ukrainian SSR, Soviet Union
- Party: Independent
- Other political affiliations: Batkivshchyna

Volodymyr Vasyliovych Mykolaienko (Ukrainian: Володимир Васильович Миколаєнко; born 8 April 1960) is a Ukrainian politician who served as the mayor of Kherson from 2015 to 2020.

On 25 May 2014, at the extraordinary elections, Mykolaienko was elected the mayor of Kherson. He was re-elected as the mayor of Kherson in the next local elections after two rounds (25 October and 15 November 2015, respectively). On 18 April 2022, Mykolaienko was abducted by Russian after refusing to work with Russian-collaborators, who threatened to have his legs broken if he did not assume the role of Mayor of Kherson under the Russian occupation of Kherson Oblast. After spending three and a half years in captivity, Mykolayenko was released on 24 August 2025 in a prisoner exchange during the Independence Day of Ukraine.

== Biography ==
We will not meet with bread and salt either local separatists or visiting actors of the separate genre. If necessary, we will shoot to kill. Everyone has been warned and understands the gravity of the situation.

— Mykolaienko, as Mayor of Kherson, expressing his tough position regarding the prevention of provocations in Kherson and the impossibility of the city being seized by terrorist groups (2015)

He is a participant of the Euromaidan, after which on 28 May 2014, he was elected mayor of Kherson. In 2017, Mykolaienko submitted an electronic declaration for 2016.

During the events related to the annexation of Crimea and military aggression in the East of Ukraine, Kherson became a strategic temporary border city. During the protests in the East of Ukraine, he expressed his tough position on preventing provocations in Kherson and the impossibility of seizing the city by separatist groups.

In 2015, he was elected mayor, gaining 24.81% of the votes in the 1st round (20,903 votes), in the second round - 67.78% of the votes (37,532 votes). His successor is Ihor Kolykhaiev, who took office in 2020.

On 24 February 2022, the first day of the Russian invasion of Ukraine, Mykolaienko joined a crowd of hundreds of Kherson residents outside the military enlistment office demanding to be given weapons.

== Captivity and release ==
On 18 April 2022, Mykolaienko was abducted by Russia after refusing to collaborate with Russian-sympathizers, who wanted him to assume the role of Mayor of Kherson under the Russian occupation of Kherson Oblast. Mykolaienko roughly told his niece, Hanna Korshun-Samchuk, that he would rather be imprisoned in a basement than work with Russia, even after being threatened with the breaking of both of his legs. Mykolaienko's wife stated that he had been abducted by Russian occupiers in Kherson and his current whereabouts are unknown. After his abduction, Mykolaienko was taken to Crimea, and then to correctional colony No. 7 in Pakino, Russia. According to his niece, Hanna Korshun-Samchuk, sometime in 2022 after being abducted, Mykolaienko refused to be included in a prisoner exchange as to trade places with another prisoner who had gangrene in his leg.

On 24 August 2025, Mykolayenko was freed in a prisoner exchange during the Independence Day of Ukraine. According to his wife who Mykolayenko talked on the phone with shortly after his release, his first words back were "Glory to Ukraine". In addition to wishing the people of Kherson a happy Independence day, Mykolayenko further stated that during his time in captivity, Russia's intention was to break down captured Ukrainians both physically and morally, and that "they are doing it quite successfully". The release was made while the current Mayor of Kherson Ihor Kolykhaiev remained in captivity.
