= Heorhiy Borzenko =

Soviet footballer

Heorhiy Frolovych Borzenko (born 1927) is a former Soviet footballer, a forward.

Borzenko spent most of his playing career with FC Lokomotyv Kharkiv in 1947-55. After the team was taken out of competition, he played for a season with Avanhard Kharkiv and then Khimik Dniprodzerzhynsk. In 1953 Borzenko was recognized as the Ukrainian player of the year.

== Career statistics ==
=== Club ===
Season	Club	League	League		Cup		Europe.		Other		Total	
Season	Club	League	Apps	Goals	Apps	Goals	Apps	Goals	Apps	Goals	Apps	Goals
1947	Lokomotiv	Soviet II Group	16	4	1	-	-	-	-	-	17	4
1948	Lokomotiv	Soviet II Group	12	10	2	-	-	-	-	-	14	10
1949	Lokomotiv	Soviet I Group	34	13	1	1	-	-	-	-	35	14
1950	Lokomotiv	Soviet Class A	24	2	-	-	-	-	-	-	24	2
1951	Lokomotiv	Soviet Class B	34	13	2	1	-	-	-	-	36	14
1952	Lokomotiv	Soviet Class B	10	2	3	1	-	-	-	-	13	3
1953	Lokomotiv	Soviet Class A	21	8	1	-	-	-	-	-	22	8
1954	Lokomotiv	Soviet Class A	19	4	1	-	-	-	-	-	20	4
1955	Lokomotiv	Soviet Class B	26	12	1	-	-	-	-	-	27	12
1956	Avanhard	Soviet Class B	8	2	-	-	-	-	-	-	8	2
1957	Khimik	Soviet Class B	4	-	-	-	-	-	-	-	4	-
Total for Lokomotiv			196	68	12	3	-	-	-	-	208	71
Career totals			210	70	12	3	-	-	-	-	222	73
