= Mykhailo Byelykh =

Soviet football and Ukrainian coach

Personal information
- Full name: Mykhailo Arkadiyovych Byelykh
- Date of birth: 23 December 1958
- Place of birth: Krasnyi Luch, Luhansk Oblast, Ukrainian SSR
- Date of death: 29 July 1997 (aged 38)
- Place of death: Hradyzk, Poltava Oblast, Ukraine
- Position: Midfielder

Senior career*
Years	Team	Apps	(Gls)
1981–1986	Stakhanovets Stakhanov	189	(14)
1987	Sudnobudivnyk Mykolaiv	9	(0)
1989	FC Kremin Kremenchuk	33	(2)

Managerial career
- 1992–1996: FC Naftokhimik Kremenchuk
- 1996–1997: FC Kremin Kremenchuk
- * Club domestic league appearances and goals

Mykhailo Arkadiyovych Byelykh (Ukrainian: Михайло Аркадійович Бєлих; born 23 December 1958 – 29 July 1997) was a former Soviet footballer and a Ukrainian coach as well as a futsal player.
