= 1977 KFK competitions (Ukraine) =

KFK competitions
- Season: 1977
- Champions: Prylad Mukacheve

The 1977 KFK competitions in Ukraine were part of the 1977 Soviet KFK competitions that were conducted in the Soviet Union. It was 13th season of the KFK in Ukraine since its introduction in 1964.

== First stage ==
=== Group 1 ===
| Pos | Team | Pld | W | D | L | GF | GA | GD | Pts |
|---|---|---|---|---|---|---|---|---|---|
| 1 | Burevisnyk Ternopil | 22 | 13 | 8 | 1 | 31 | 11 | +20 | 34 |
| 2 | Sokil Lviv | 22 | 14 | 3 | 5 | 27 | 11 | +16 | 31 |
| 3 | Khimik Kalush | 22 | 12 | 4 | 6 | 35 | 18 | +17 | 28 |
| 4 | Bukovyna Chernivtsi | 22 | 12 | 3 | 7 | 33 | 22 | +11 | 27 |
| 5 | Urozhai Kolchyno | 22 | 11 | 5 | 6 | 21 | 16 | +5 | 27 |
| 6 | Torpedo Zhytomyr | 22 | 10 | 5 | 7 | 33 | 16 | +17 | 25 |
| 7 | Khimik Novyi Rozdol | 22 | 9 | 6 | 7 | 21 | 21 | 0 | 24 |
| 8 | Shakhtar Novovolynsk | 22 | 9 | 2 | 11 | 24 | 33 | −9 | 20 |
| 9 | Siret Storozhynets | 22 | 7 | 6 | 9 | 18 | 30 | −12 | 20 |
| 10 | Budivelnyk Monastyrsk | 22 | 6 | 5 | 11 | 31 | 40 | −9 | 17 |
| 11 | imeni Rudnieva Ivano-Frankivsk | 22 | 2 | 2 | 18 | 8 | 36 | −28 | 6 |
| 12 | Kolos Luzhany | 22 | 2 | 1 | 19 | 9 | 37 | −28 | 5 |

Source: ukr-football.org.ua

=== Group 2 ===
| Pos | Team | Pld | W | D | L | GF | GA | GD | Pts |
|---|---|---|---|---|---|---|---|---|---|
| 1 | Pryladyst Mukachevo | 22 | 17 | 2 | 3 | 36 | 12 | +24 | 36 |
| 2 | Shkirianyk Berdychiv | 22 | 12 | 7 | 3 | 35 | 15 | +20 | 31 |
| 3 | Elektron Ivano-Frankivsk | 22 | 12 | 6 | 4 | 35 | 15 | +20 | 30 |
| 4 | LVVPU Lviv | 22 | 12 | 4 | 6 | 27 | 18 | +9 | 28 |
| 5 | Refryzherator Fastiv | 22 | 10 | 6 | 6 | 31 | 16 | +15 | 26 |
| 6 | Shakhtar Chervonohrad | 22 | 8 | 8 | 6 | 33 | 23 | +10 | 24 |
| 7 | Kombainobudivnyk Ternopil | 22 | 9 | 4 | 9 | 36 | 33 | +3 | 22 |
| 8 | Arsenal Kyiv | 22 | 6 | 8 | 8 | 21 | 29 | −8 | 20 |
| 9 | Plastyk Vynohradove | 22 | 6 | 5 | 11 | 26 | 20 | +6 | 17 |
| 10 | Kolos Borodianka | 22 | 6 | 2 | 14 | 19 | 42 | −23 | 14 |
| 11 | Tsementnyk Kamianets-Podilskyi | 22 | 3 | 5 | 14 | 11 | 49 | −38 | 11 |
| 12 | Avanhard Vinnytsia | 22 | 2 | 1 | 19 | 4 | 42 | −38 | 5 |

Source: ukr-football.org.ua

=== Group 3 ===
| Pos | Team | Pld | W | D | L | GF | GA | GD | Pts |
|---|---|---|---|---|---|---|---|---|---|
| 1 | Vostok Kyiv | 22 | 14 | 7 | 1 | 45 | 12 | +33 | 35 |
| 2 | Bilshovyk Kyiv | 22 | 12 | 7 | 3 | 32 | 15 | +17 | 31 |
| 3 | Radyst Kirovohrad | 22 | 12 | 5 | 5 | 30 | 24 | +6 | 29 |
| 4 | Burevisnyk Poltava | 22 | 9 | 9 | 4 | 40 | 26 | +14 | 27 |
| 5 | Avanhard Lozova | 22 | 9 | 8 | 5 | 31 | 24 | +7 | 26 |
| 6 | Promin Poltava | 22 | 9 | 7 | 6 | 27 | 25 | +2 | 25 |
| 7 | Okean Mykolaiv | 22 | 7 | 6 | 9 | 30 | 34 | −4 | 20 |
| 8 | Shakhtar Oleksandriya | 22 | 4 | 9 | 9 | 23 | 37 | −14 | 17 |
| 9 | Lokomotyv Smila | 22 | 6 | 4 | 12 | 29 | 31 | −2 | 16 |
| 10 | Fotoprylad Cherkasy | 22 | 4 | 7 | 11 | 19 | 37 | −18 | 15 |
| 11 | Promin Chernihiv | 22 | 5 | 4 | 13 | 19 | 35 | −16 | 14 |
| 12 | Khimik Shostka | 22 | 3 | 3 | 16 | 13 | 38 | −25 | 9 |

Source: ukr-football.org.ua

=== Group 4 ===
| Pos | Team | Pld | W | D | L | GF | GA | GD | Pts |
|---|---|---|---|---|---|---|---|---|---|
| 1 | Tytan Armyansk | 22 | 16 | 3 | 3 | 60 | 20 | +40 | 35 |
| 2 | ZKL Dnipropetrovsk | 22 | 11 | 7 | 4 | 31 | 18 | +13 | 29 |
| 3 | Enerhiya Nova Kakhovka | 22 | 11 | 5 | 6 | 39 | 19 | +20 | 27 |
| 4 | Transformator Zaporizhia | 22 | 10 | 7 | 5 | 39 | 30 | +9 | 27 |
| 5 | Naftovyk Kherson | 22 | 11 | 4 | 7 | 41 | 38 | +3 | 26 |
| 6 | Metalurh Dniprodzerzhynsk | 22 | 8 | 7 | 7 | 25 | 21 | +4 | 23 |
| 7 | Portovyk Illichivsk | 22 | 10 | 3 | 9 | 12 | 23 | −11 | 23 |
| 8 | Azovets Berdiansk | 22 | 7 | 5 | 10 | 21 | 32 | −11 | 19 |
| 9 | Budivelnyk Henichesk | 22 | 7 | 4 | 11 | 33 | 49 | −16 | 18 |
| 10 | Avanhard Dzhankoy | 22 | 6 | 4 | 12 | 20 | 45 | −25 | 16 |
| 11 | Sudnobudivnyk Mykolaiv | 22 | 6 | 3 | 13 | 24 | 37 | −13 | 15 |
| 12 | Kolos Tatarbunary | 22 | 2 | 2 | 18 | 13 | 26 | −13 | 6 |

Source: ukr-football.org.ua

=== Group 5 ===
| Pos | Team | Pld | W | D | L | GF | GA | GD | Pts |
|---|---|---|---|---|---|---|---|---|---|
| 1 | Shakhtobudivnyk Donetsk | 22 | 12 | 6 | 4 | 43 | 21 | +22 | 30 |
| 2 | Metalurh Kupiansk | 22 | 13 | 3 | 6 | 26 | 16 | +10 | 29 |
| 3 | Okean Kerch | 22 | 13 | 2 | 7 | 36 | 20 | +16 | 28 |
| 4 | Press Dnipropetrovsk | 22 | 12 | 3 | 7 | 37 | 19 | +18 | 27 |
| 5 | Monolit Donetsk | 22 | 11 | 4 | 7 | 29 | 26 | +3 | 26 |
| 6 | Kirovets Makiivka | 22 | 11 | 3 | 8 | 27 | 26 | +1 | 25 |
| 7 | Kolos Pavlohrad | 22 | 8 | 6 | 8 | 28 | 23 | +5 | 22 |
| 8 | Frehat Pervomaisk | 22 | 9 | 3 | 10 | 34 | 30 | +4 | 21 |
| 9 | Shakhtar Kadiivka | 22 | 5 | 10 | 7 | 27 | 21 | +6 | 20 |
| 10 | Shakhtar Sverdlovsk | 22 | 8 | 3 | 11 | 20 | 35 | −15 | 19 |
| 11 | Komunarets Komunarsk | 22 | 3 | 3 | 16 | 12 | 37 | −25 | 9 |
| 12 | Metalurh Artemivsk | 22 | 3 | 2 | 17 | 16 | 60 | −44 | 8 |

Source: ukr-football.org.ua

== Final ==
| Pos | Team | Pld | W | D | L | GF | GA | GD | Pts |
|---|---|---|---|---|---|---|---|---|---|
| 1 | Prylad Mukacheve | 4 | 3 | 1 | 0 | 7 | 1 | +6 | 7 |
| 2 | Tytan Armyansk | 4 | 2 | 2 | 0 | 5 | 3 | +2 | 6 |
| 3 | Burevisnyk Ternopil | 4 | 2 | 1 | 1 | 7 | 3 | +4 | 5 |
| 4 | Shakhtobudivnyk Donetsk | 4 | 0 | 1 | 3 | 3 | 8 | −5 | 1 |
| 5 | Skhid Kyiv | 4 | 0 | 1 | 3 | 2 | 3 | −1 | 1 |

Source: ukr-football.org.ua
