= 1983 KFK competitions (Ukraine) =

KFK competitions
- Season: 1983
- Champions: Dynamo Irpin

The 1983 KFK competitions in Ukraine were part of the 1983 Soviet KFK competitions that were conducted in the Soviet Union. It was 19th season of the KFK in Ukraine since its introduction in 1964. The winner eventually qualified to the 1984 Soviet Second League.

== First stage ==
=== Group 1 ===
Pos	Team	Pld	W	D	L	GF	GA	GD	Pts
1	Spartak Sambir	14	9	4	1	20	9	+11	22
2	Naftovyk Dolyna	14	10	0	4	31	17	+14	20
3	Lokomotyv Ivano-Frankivsk	14	7	3	4	18	10	+8	17
4	Intehral Vinnytsia	14	6	3	5	13	16	−3	15
5	Kation Khmelnytskyi	14	5	3	6	18	24	−6	13
6	Kooperator Khust	14	4	3	7	15	14	+1	11
7	HVZ Chernivtsi	14	3	3	8	11	18	−7	9
8	Kolos Kivertsi	14	2	1	11	9	27	−18	5

Source: ukr-football.org.ua

=== Group 2 ===
Pos	Team	Pld	W	D	L	GF	GA	GD	Pts
1	Avtomobilist Lviv	14	10	1	3	21	8	+13	21
2	Sokil Haisyn	14	9	1	4	15	10	+5	19
3	Silmash Kovel	14	8	1	5	19	7	+12	17
4	Prohres Berdychiv	14	6	2	6	11	22	−11	14
5	Vatra Ternopil	14	6	2	6	22	15	+7	14
6	Papirnyk Malyn	14	6	1	7	16	18	−2	13
7	Khimik Kalush	14	4	3	7	9	13	−4	11
8	Budivelnyk Kuznetsovsk	14	1	1	12	3	23	−20	3

Source: ukr-football.org.ua

=== Group 3 ===
Pos	Team	Pld	W	D	L	GF	GA	GD	Pts
1	Dynamo Irpin	14	9	1	4	31	20	+11	19
2	Mashynobudivnyk Borodianka	14	8	2	4	25	12	+13	18
3	Naftovyk Okhtyrka	14	8	1	5	15	12	+3	17
4	Lyvarnyk Sumy	14	6	4	4	15	13	+2	16
5	Shakhtar Oleksandriia	14	6	2	6	17	14	+3	14
6	Budivelnyk Prypiat	14	5	3	6	15	16	−1	13
7	Bilshovyk Kyiv	14	3	2	9	13	23	−10	8
8	Khimik Cherkasy	14	2	3	9	8	29	−21	7

Source: ukr-football.org.ua

=== Group 4 ===
Pos	Team	Pld	W	D	L	GF	GA	GD	Pts
1	Kooperator Poltava	16	12	2	2	33	13	+20	26
2	Voskhod Kyiv	16	9	5	2	35	12	+23	23
3	Hirnyk Pavlohrad	16	8	3	5	23	18	+5	19
4	Metalurh Kupiansk	16	7	2	7	19	13	+6	16
5	Frehat Pervomaisk	16	7	2	7	27	33	−6	16
6	Shakhtar Dzerzhynsk	16	6	3	7	16	20	−4	15
7	Lokomotyv Znamianka	16	4	3	9	21	31	−10	11
8	Transformator Zaporizhia	16	3	3	10	10	25	−15	9
9	Avtomobilist Poltava	16	3	3	10	16	35	−19	9

Source: ukr-football.org.ua

=== Group 5 ===
Pos	Team	Pld	W	D	L	GF	GA	GD	Pts
1	Enerhiia Nova Kakhovka	14	12	1	1	46	11	+35	25
2	Khvylia Mykolaiv	14	11	1	2	35	14	+21	23
3	Suvorovets Izmail	14	7	2	5	17	21	−4	16
4	Radyst Kirovohrad	14	6	4	4	25	11	+14	16
5	Kolos Osokorivka	14	5	4	5	23	16	+7	14
6	Avtomobilist Zaporizhzhia	14	3	2	9	13	36	−23	8
7	Lokomotyv Kotovsk	14	3	0	11	10	38	−28	6
8	Vynohradar Alushta	14	2	0	12	14	36	−22	4

Source: ukr-football.org.ua

=== Group 6 ===
Pos	Team	Pld	W	D	L	GF	GA	GD	Pts
1	Torpedo Zaporizhzhia	14	10	4	0	37	7	+30	24
2	Sokil Rovenky	14	9	3	2	21	6	+15	21
3	Kirovets Makiivka	14	5	5	4	15	13	+2	15
4	ShVSM Kharkiv	14	4	5	5	11	20	−9	13
5	Shakhtar Sverdlovsk	14	4	3	7	15	22	−7	11
6	Mashynobudivnyk Artemivsk	14	3	4	7	12	21	−9	10
7	Pervomayets Pervomaisk	14	3	3	8	12	18	−6	9
8	Tesktylnyk Donetsk	14	2	5	7	9	25	−16	9

Source: ukr-football.org.ua

== Final ==
Final tournament took place in Kyiv and Irpin.

Pos	Team	Pld	W	D	L	GF	GA	GD	Pts	Promotion
1	Dynamo Irpin	5	3	2	0	9	4	+5	8	Promoted to Second League
2	Torpedo Zaporizhzhia	5	3	2	0	7	4	+3	8	
3	Avtomobilist Lviv	5	2	2	1	4	3	+1	6	
4	Spartak Sambir	5	1	1	3	4	7	−3	3	
5	Enerhiia Nova Kakhovka	5	1	1	3	3	5	−2	3	
6	Kooperator Poltava (Note: FC Kooperator Poltava was a Soviet amateur university club that existed for a short while and represented the Kooperative Institute (see Poltava University of Economics and Trade). The club was based on the sports academy of the dissolved FC Kolos Poltava.)	5	0	2	3	2	6	−4	2	

Source: ukr-football.org.ua
