= Poltava University of Economics and Trade =

Public university in Poltava, Ukraine

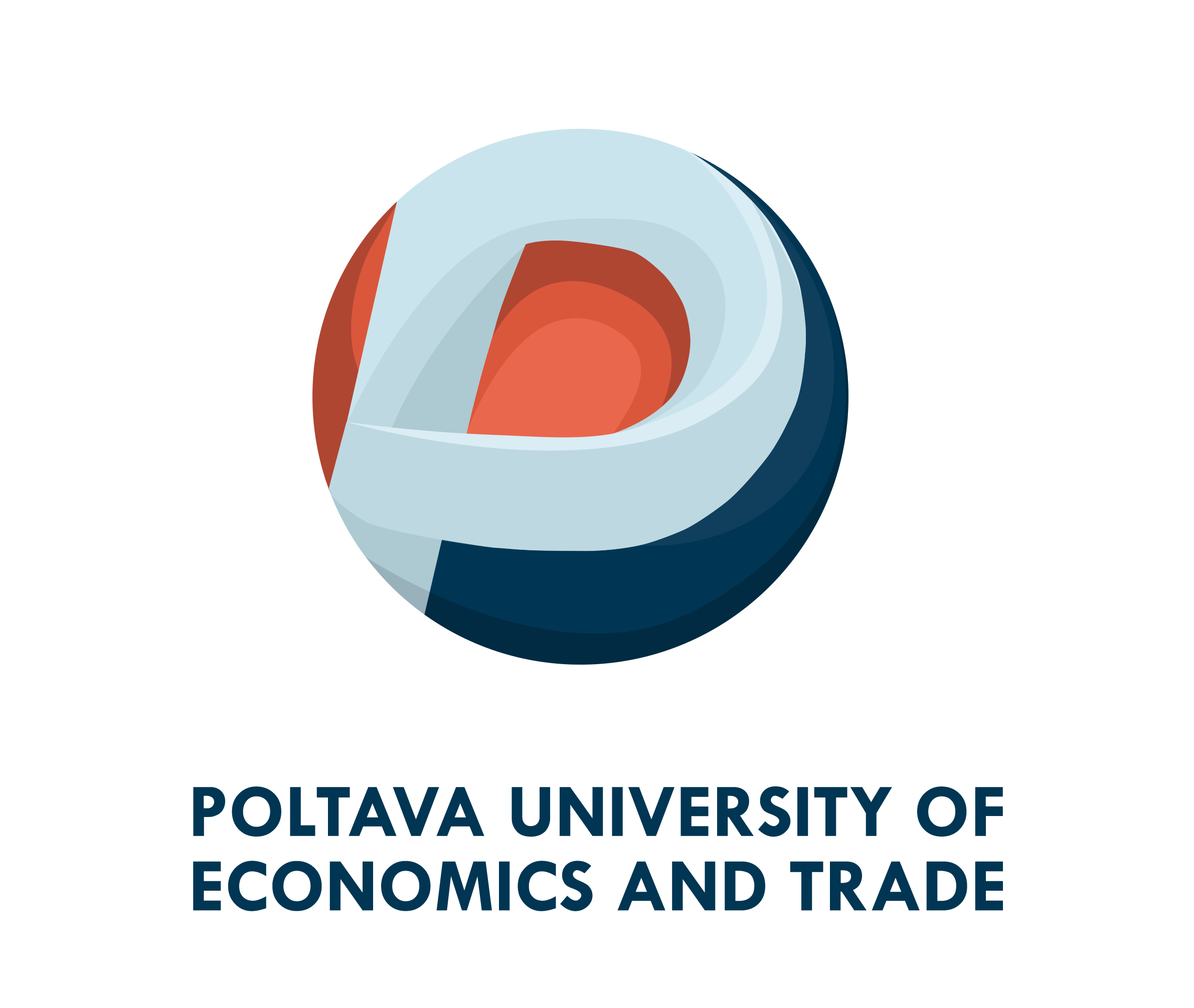
- Motto in English: Dream Big!
- Established: 1961
- Affiliations: Ministry of Education and Science of Ukraine
- President: Alexey Nestulia
- Location: Poltava, Ukraine; 49.595°N 34.543°E
- Website: puet.edu.ua
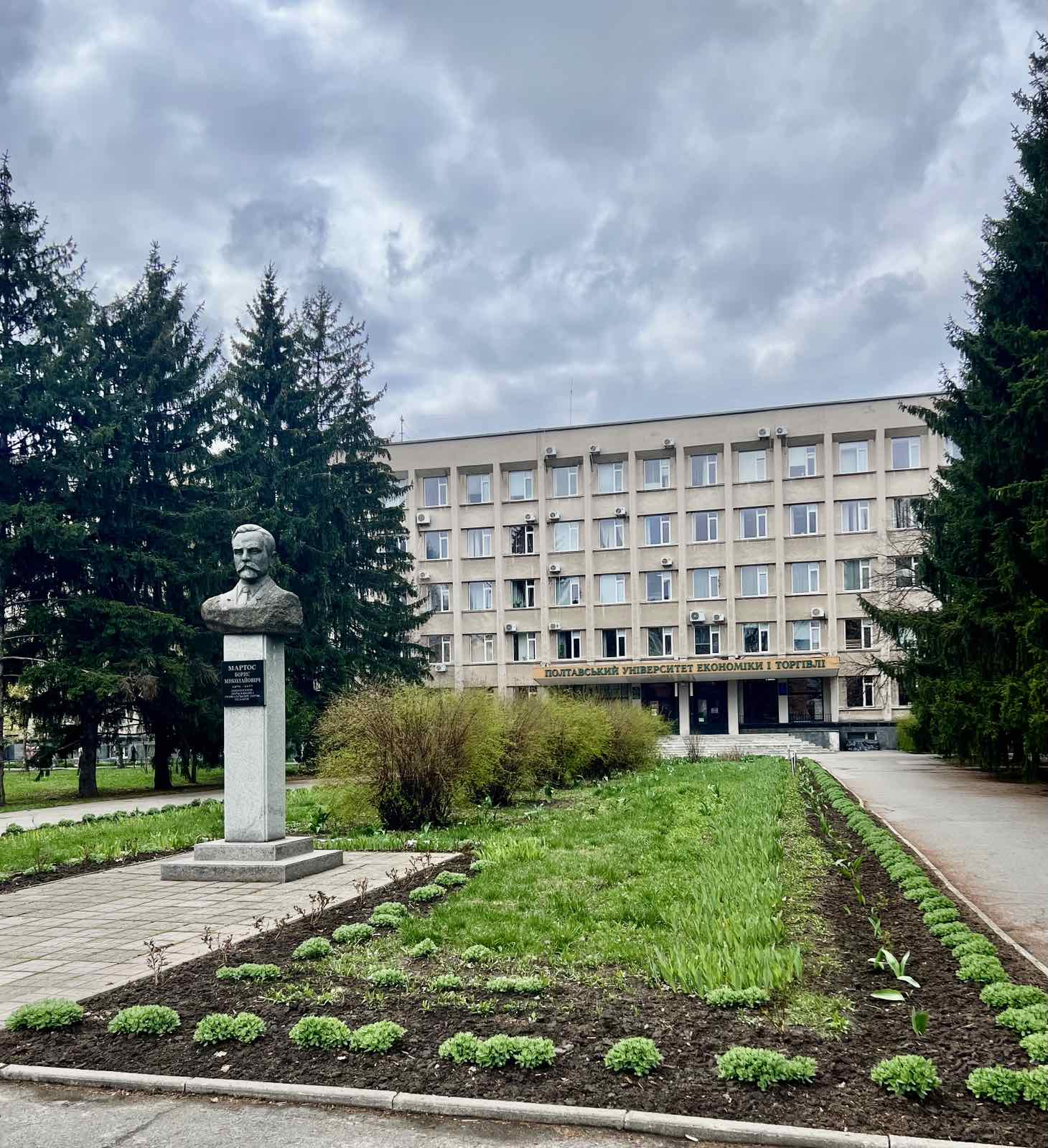

The Poltava University of Economics and Trade (abbr. PUET; Ukrainian: Полтавський університет економіки і торгівлі, ПУЕТ) is one of the biggest universities in Poltava Oblast, Ukraine.

== History ==
The university started in 1961 as a teaching and consultation center. In 1968, it became a department and soon – in 1970 a branch of Lviv Trade and Economics Institute.

In 1974 Poltava Cooperative Institute was established.

The first president Dianich M. M. (1970–1987).

The second president Victor A. Dorokhin (1987–2003).

in 1996 the institute introduced a training program for Bachelors in the following fields: Economics and Entrepreneurship, Management, Trade, Food Technology and Engineering.

In the early 90s, institute started postgraduate education. For this purpose, Interdisciplinary Institute for advanced training of specialists of Consumer Cooperatives was opened in Poltava Cooperative Institute. In 1997, the institute has been accredited by the Accreditation level 3. Ministry of Education of Ukraine during 1998 awarded the institute with appropriate licenses and certificates.

May 21, 2001 was created Poltava University of Consumer Cooperatives in Ukraine.

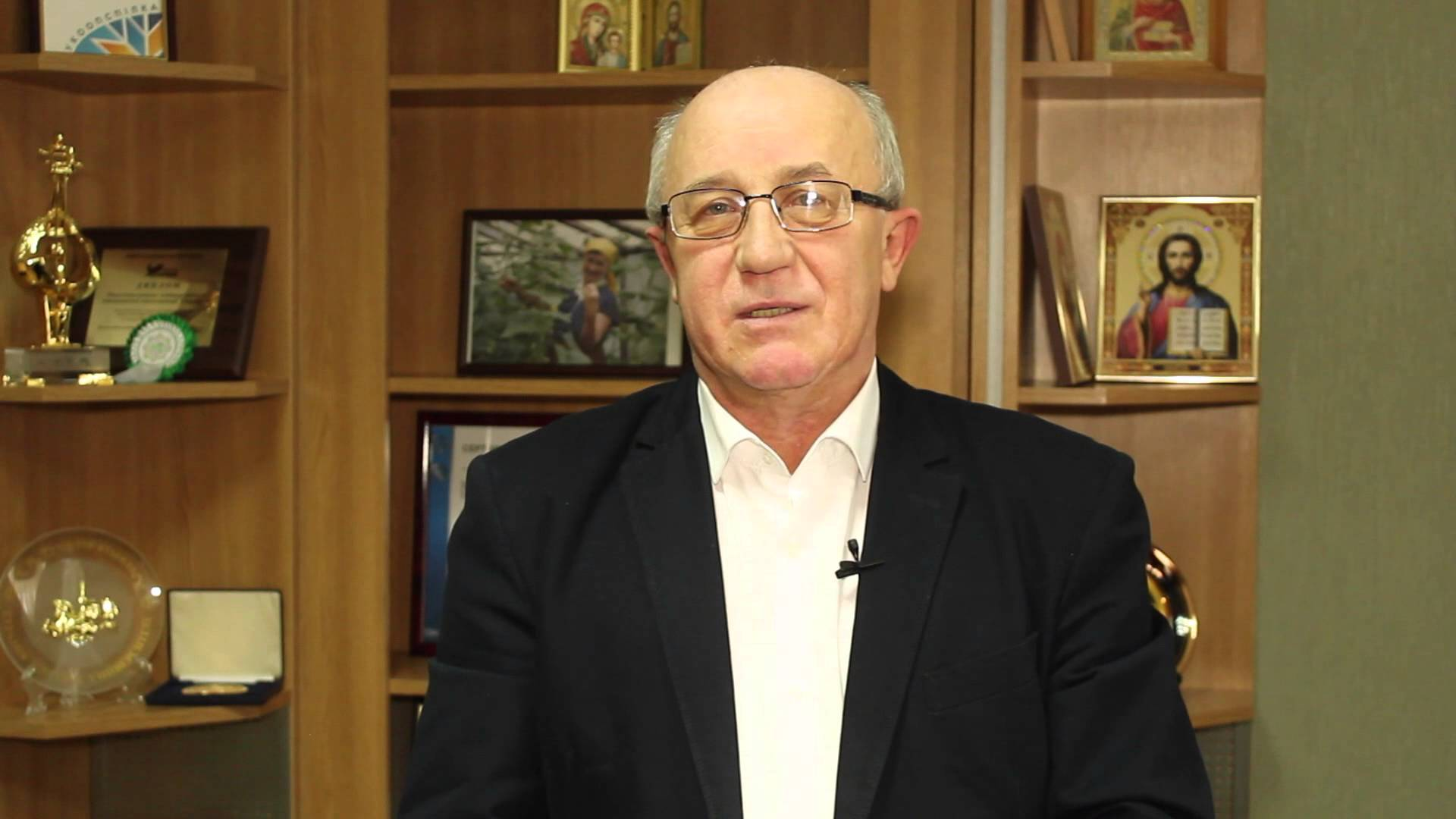
President Poltava University of Economics and Trade

In 2003 Alexey A. Nestulya became the president.

During this period, the university began to grow rapidly and enhance its reputation. In the same year the university started training professionals in the fields — Economic Cybernetics, Banking and Social Informatics. In 2006 — Personnel Management and Labour Economics and in 2007 — Hotel and Restaurant Business.

In 2009 the university was accredited again and it was awarded the fourth — the highest level. Licensed numbers of students in all majors are: for full-time studies — up to 2700 people and for correspondence studies - up to 6100 people.

In April 2010 university changed its name to Poltava University of Economics and Trade.

In 2012 the university was included in the top ten economic university in Ukraine.

In 2013 opened Distance Education Center.

In 2022 Poltava University of Economics and Trade was listed among top 200 Ukraine 2022 ranking of Ukrainian universities.

== Faculty ==
- Economics, Management and Information Technology
- Commodities, Trade and Marketing
- Food Technology, Hotel, Restaurant and Tourism Business

== Schools ==
- International Economics
- Banking
- Biotechnology
- Documentation and Information Activities
- Informatics
- Marketing
- Management of Organizations
- Hotel and Restaurant Business
- Food Technology
- Law
- Commodity and Commercial Activities
- Commodity and Expertise in Customs
- Tourism
- Personnel Management and Labour Economics
- Accounting and Auditing
- Philology
- Finance and Credit
- Enterprise Economics
- Economic Cybernetics

== University today ==
More than 300 students arrived from 20 countries to choose PUET as the foundation of their future career.

- The university has students from many different countries: Ukraine, Azerbaijan, Moldova, Turkmenistan, Turkey, China, Nigeria, India

== Sports ==
In 1983 the football team of the university participated in the 1983 KFK Ukrainian competitions as Kooperator Poltava.

== See also ==
- Kyiv National University of Trade and Economics
- List of universities in Ukraine
