= Pakino =

Pakino Пакино
- Settlement
- Location within Vladimir Oblast Location within Russia
- Coordinates: 56°21′N 41°14′E
- Country: Russia
- Region: Vladimir Oblast
- District: Kovrovsky District
- Time zone: UTC+3:00

Pakino (Russian: Пакино) is a rural locality (a settlement) in Malyginskoye Rural Settlement, Kovrovsky District, Vladimir Oblast, Russia. The population was 4,605 as of 2010. There are 6 streets.

== Geography ==
Pakino is located 12 km west of Kovrov (the district's administrative centre) by road. Kovrov is the nearest rural locality.
