= FC Krystal Kherson =

Professional association football club based in Kherson, Ukraine

Krystal Kherson
- Full name: Municipal Football Club Krystal Kherson
- Founded: 1961; 65 years ago
- Dissolved: 2022; 4 years ago
- Ground: Krystal Stadium, Kherson
- Capacity: 3,400
- President: Serhiy Shevtsov
- Manager: Yuriy Kulish
- 2020–21: Ukrainian First League, 16th of 16 (relegated)
Home colours	Away colours

Krystal Kherson was a professional football club from Kherson in Ukraine that has a long history in the Soviet and then the Ukrainian Leagues. As of the 2020–21 season, it will play in the Ukrainian First League, the second tier of Ukrainian football, following promotion from the 2019–20 Ukrainian Second League.

== History ==
=== Predecessors (Spartak Kherson) ===
The modern Kherson Oblast was established in 1944. In 1937–1941 Kherson was part of Mykolaiv Oblast.

The first Kherson team made its random appearance in the so called Ukrainian Championship of cities in 1921, yet it was not until 1936 the Kherson city team competed regularly by debuting in the 1936 Football Championship of the Ukrainian SSR at Tretia Hrupa (Ukrainian tier 3). It continued its participation until 1938 when it was renamed as "Znannia". Further participation of the team was interrupted by the World War II.

The Kherson teams renewed their participation in 1946 when the city team representing the Spartak sports society took part in the 1946 Football Championship of the Ukrainian SSR. In Ukraine after World War II, Spartak sports teams represented a regional government. That season of republican competitions conditionally is called as the "Soviet Third Group" (Tretya Gruppa). Spartak placed only second in its group behind Bilshovyk Zaporizhia, but were admitted next year to the All-Union competitions, nonetheless. It made its debut in the 1947 Vtoraya Gruppa (tier 2), Ukrainian Conference (Zone). The first season Spartak finished 7th among 13 teams. The team remained in the competitions until 1949 when it was relegated due to competition reorganization (establishment of Class A and Class B) back to republican championship.

After admission of Spartak to the All-Union competitions in 1947, at republican competition Kherson was represented by Dynamo Kherson which in the 1947 Football Championship of the Ukrainian SSR qualified for the final group placing 4th. In the next couple of seasons Kherson at republican level was represented by Avanhard Kherson until return of Spartak. Performance of Avanhard in those seasons was weak finishing at the bottom of tables.

In 1957, Spartak played for the last time at republican level. In 1958, Spartak Kherson was admitted to the Soviet Class B.

Following promotion of Spartak again to the All-Union competitions, in 1958 and 1959, Kherson was represented by Avanhard in Ukrainian republican competitions, while Spartak continued to play in Class B.

=== Club's history ===
==== Names ====
Year	Name	Year	Name
1961—1962	Majak Kherson	1992—1994	Tavriya Kherson
1963—1964	Budivelnyk Kherson	1995	Vodnyk Kherson
1965—1975	Lokomotiv Kherson	1996—1999	Krystal Kherson
1975—1992	Krystal Kherson	2000—2003	SC Kherson
		2003—present	Krystal Kherson

==== Original club ====
The club was formed in 1961 at the Kherson Semiconductor Factory as Mayak (English: Lighthouse). The club replaced the previous city team of masters Spartak Kherson that represented Kherson since 1958.

In 1963, the club was renamed as Stroitel (Budivelnyk). Due to reforms in Soviet football, the division where Stroitel played was demoted the third tier.

In 1965, the club was renamed again as Lokomotyv. The very same year another Lokomotyv Kherson also played in the newly formed competitions among physical fitness clubs. In 1968, the Kherson club was promoted and for couple of seasons played at Class A until 1970 reform when it was admitted to the newly formed Soviet Second League (again as the third tier).

In 1976, the club was renamed for the third time as Krystal.

When Ukraine became independent, the club entered the Persha Liha. Unfortunately, the club was relegated to the Druha Liha where it competed until the club's administration dissolved the club in 2006 and for the first time since 1958 the city did not have own professional club.

==== Second edition ====
The club was revived and entered into Ukrainian Amateur competition (Fourth level) in 2011. After a five-year absence from the professional leagues Krystal Kherson applied for readmittance to the Professional Football League of Ukraine and was admitted. The club will compete in the Ukrainian Second League for the 2011–12 season.

In 2017, the club was reorganized and started out again from afresh as the city's club from the Amateurs.

=== Other clubs ===
In 1982 and 1988, there also existed club Shlyakhovyk that played in competitions among physical culture clubs (KFK).

== Honors ==
- Ukrainian Second League (Druha Liha)
  - Winners (1): 1997–98 (B)
  - Runners-up (3): 1995–96 (B), 1998–99 (B), 2004–05 (B)
- Ukrainian Amateur Football Championship (Chempionat z futbolu sered amatoriv)
  - Runners-up (1): 2017–18 (Group 3)
- Ukrainian Second League Cup (Kubok Druhoi Lihy)
  - Runners-up (1): 1999-00
- Ukrainian Second League

Fair Play award 2019-20 season

== League and cup history ==
=== Soviet Union ===
Season	Div.	Pos.	Pl.	W	D	L	GS	GA	P	Domestic Cup	Europe	Notes
Mayak Kherson
1961	2nd "Ukr.1"	26	36	10	11	15	35	43	31			Two stages
1962	2nd "Ukr.2"	27	34	8	9	17	44	62	25			Two stages/Relegated
Budivelnyk Kherson
1963	3rd "Ukr.1"	16	40	15	13	12	51	51	43			Two stages
1964	3rd "Ukr.2"	22										Two stages
Lokomotyv Kherson
1965	3rd "Ukr.3"	23	42	13	17	12	41	37	43			Two stages
1966	3rd "Ukr.2"	3	40	21	11	8	57	30	53			Two stages
1967	3rd "Ukr.2"	5	40	22	9	9	74	32	53			Promoted
1968	2nd "2"	11	40	15	11	14	42	32	41			
1969	2nd "3"	11	42	13	15	14	42	38	41			Relegated
1970	3rd "1"	10	42	16	12	14	60	50	44			
1971	3rd "1"	13	50	18	14	18	46	53	50			
1972	3rd "1"	20	46	15	7	24	55	82	37			
1973	3rd "1"	10	44	17	5/10	12	49	33	39			no draws
1974	3rd "6"	10	38	13	13	12	49	48	39			
1975	3rd "6"	17	32	3	11	18	24	65	17			Avoided relegation
Krystal Kherson
1976	3rd "6"	5	38	14	15	9	36	24	43			
1977	3rd "2"	7	44	20	12	12	54	40	52			
1978	3rd "2"	6	44	20	14	10	46	28	54			
1979	3rd "2"	7	46	21	10	15	63	45	52			
1980	3rd "5"	11	44	15	16	13	37	37	46			
1981	3rd "5"	15	44	15	9	20	62	73	39			
1982	3rd "6"	19	46	12	12	22	41	64	36			
1983	3rd "6"	16	50	17	10	23	45	55	44			
1984	3rd "6"	7	36	16	8	12	45	47	40			Two stages
1985	3rd "6"	17	40	12	16	12	41	46	40			Two stages
1986	3rd "6"	25	40	9	14	17	51	72	32			Two stages
1987	3rd "6"	18	52	16	10	26	54	79	42			
1988	3rd "6"	18	50	16	15	19	48	52	47			
1989	3rd "6"	25	52	13	10	29	63	84	36			
1990	3rd (lower, 1)	5	36	18	9	9	61	44	45			
1991	3rd (lower, 1)	6	50	23	15	12	82	60	61			

=== Ukraine ===
Season	Div.	Pos.	Pl.	W	D	L	GS	GA	P	Domestic Cup	Europe	Notes
1992	2nd "B"	10	26	10	5	11	36	36	25	1/32 finals		Relegated
Krystal Kherson → Tavriya Kherson
1992–93	3rd	10	34	12	8	14	33	29	32	1/64 finals		
1993–94	3rd	13	42	13	13	16	44	49	39	1/32 finals		
Tavriya Kherson → Vodnyk Kherson
1994–95	3rd "B"	18	42	11	7	24	35	61	40	1/64 finals		
Krystal Kherson
1995–96	3rd "B"	2	40	24	7	9	75	29	79	1/32 finals		
1996–97	3rd "B"	6	32	13	8	11	44	34	47	1/32 finals 2nd stage		
1997–98	3rd "B"	1	32	28	2	2	74	20	88	1/16 finals		(Note: Krystal failed to win the playoffs for promotion to the Ukrainian First League. Playoffs between the 3 group champions, Krystal, Podillya Khmelnytskyi, Shakhtar-2 Donetsk and the 18th place team in Persha Liha in the 1997-98 season, FC Bukovyna Chernivtsi were held and Krystal were eliminated for promotion.)
1998–99	3rd "B"	2	26	20	2	4	55	25	62	1/64 finals		
1999–00	3rd "B"	5	26	12	5	9	40	30	41	1/8 finals (Note: Finalist of the Second League Cup)		
SC Kherson
2000–01	3rd "B"	7	28	12	6	10	26	33	42	USLC: 1/32 finals		
2001–02	3rd "B"	9	34	14	7	13	39	39	49	1/256 finals		
SC Kherson → Krystal Kherson
2002–03	3rd "B"	7	30	12	6	12	35	38	42	1/32 finals		
2003–04	3rd "B"	15	30	7	7	16	26	37	28	1/32 finals		
2004–05	3rd "B"	2	26	13	7	6	34	17	46	1/32 finals		
2005–06	3rd "B"	13	28	7	4	17	29	51	25	1/32 finals		
2006-10	Club reforms and competes in the Kherson Oblast Championship											
2010	regional competitions									UAC: 1/4 finals		
2011	4th	4	10	5	1	4	19	14	16			Admitted to SL
2011–12	3rd "A"	8	26	9	5	12	30	32	32	1/64 finals		
2012–13	3rd "A"	7	20	6	2	12	23	31	20	1/32 finals		
2012–13	3rd "3"	2	6	4	0	2	13	7	12	1/32 finals		Stage 2 (Note: Competition held in two stages. Points from Stage One not carried over. Відбулося жеребкування груп «3» та «4» другої ліги [Draw for the Groups 3 and 4 of Second League]. ua-football.com (in Ukrainian). PFL. 5 April 2013. Archived from the original on 2013-08-29.)
2013–14	3rd	9	36	15	8	13	51	48	53	1/32 finals		
2014–15	3rd	6	27	10	6	11	39	37	36	1/32 finals		
2015–16	3rd	10	26	9	1	16	31	47	28	1/16 finals		
2016–17	3rd	13	32	7	5	20	31	24	26	1/32 finals		Withdrew (Note: Withdrew from the competition after the winter break due to the club's economic and political situation. "Кристал" знімається зі змагань [Krystal withdrawing from competition]. PFL (in Ukrainian). 30 March 2017. Archived from the original on 11 February 2018. (30 March 2017))
2017	Club reforms as municipal club											
2017–18	4th "3"	2	16	9	4	3	41	15	31			Play-offs – QF
2017–18	4th "3"	2	16	9	4	3	41	15	31			Admitted to SL
2018–19	3rd "B"	4	27	15	2	10	43	29	47	1/16 finals		
2019–20	3rd "B"	2	20	15	2	3	47	17	47	1/64 finals		Promoted
2020–21	2nd	16	30	3	4	23	21	61	13	1/32 finals		Relegated

== Presidents ==
- –2013 Oleksiy Krucher
- 2017–2022 Kherson city mayor Volodymyr Mykolayenko
  - Serhiy Shvetsov (club's director)

== Managers ==
- (Russia) Vladimir Lebed – (June 2006)

== Notable players ==
- (Ukraine) Viktor Prokopenko
