= 1953 Soviet Top League =

15th season of top-tier football league in Soviet Union

Soviet Top League
- Season: 1953

11 teams took part in the league with FC Spartak Moscow winning the championship.

== League standings ==
Pos	Team	Pld	W	D	L	GF	GA	GR	Pts	Qualification
1	(Russian Soviet Federative Socialist Republic) Spartak Moscow (C)	20	11	7	2	47	15	3.133	29	League champions
2	(Georgian Soviet Socialist Republic) Dynamo Tbilisi	20	11	5	4	39	24	1.625	27	
3	(Russian Soviet Federative Socialist Republic) Torpedo Moscow	20	11	3	6	34	34	1.000	25	
4	(Russian Soviet Federative Socialist Republic) Dynamo Moscow	20	8	7	5	34	19	1.789	23	
5	(Russian Soviet Federative Socialist Republic) Zenit Leningrad	20	11	1	8	25	21	1.190	23	
6	(Russian Soviet Federative Socialist Republic) Lokomotiv Moscow	20	6	6	8	21	28	0.750	18	
7	(Russian Soviet Federative Socialist Republic) Krylia Sovetov Kuybyshev	20	6	5	9	22	25	0.880	17	
8	(Ukrainian Soviet Socialist Republic) Dynamo Kiev	20	6	5	9	21	26	0.808	17	
9	(Ukrainian Soviet Socialist Republic) Lokomotiv Kharkov	20	6	4	10	19	34	0.559	16	
10	(Russian Soviet Federative Socialist Republic) Dynamo Leningrad (W)	20	5	4	11	20	33	0.606	14	Replaced with Trudovye Rezervy Leningrad
11	(Lithuanian Soviet Socialist Republic) Spartak Vilnius (R)	20	2	7	11	10	33	0.303	11	Relegation to Class B

Source: rsssf.com
(C) Champions; (R) Relegated; (W) ?

== Results ==
Home \ Away	DYK	DLE	DYN	DTB	KRY	LKH	LOK	SPA	SVL	TOR	ZEN
Dynamo Kiev		3–3	1–0	0–1	0–1	3–0	0–1	0–2	1–1	3–1	1–0
Dynamo Leningrad	1–1		1–3	0–0	0–1	2–1	0–0	1–3	1–0	1–2	0–1
Dynamo Moscow	2–0	2–0		2–2	1–1	0–0	3–1	2–2	0–0	0–1	2–0
Dynamo Tbilisi	3–0	5–0	3–2		2–1	2–0	3–0	0–0	2–1	4–0	3–1
Krylia Sovetov Kuybyshev	0–1	1–3	1–0	1–2		5–0	2–0	0–0	3–0	0–2	1–2
Lokomotiv Kharkov	1–1	2–0	0–2	1–1	5–2		1–0	1–0	2–0	0–0	0–2
Lokomotiv Moscow	1–2	2–1	0–3	4–2	1–1	4–1		3–3	2–0	1–0	0–4
Spartak Moscow	3–1	2–0	1–1	4–1	1–0	3–0	1–1		7–0	7–1	3–0
Spartak Vilnius	0–0	1–3	1–1	1–1	0–0	0–2	0–0	1–4		3–1	1–0
Torpedo Moscow	3–2	2–1	3–8	4–1	5–1	2–0	0–0	1–1	2–0		2–1
Zenit Leningrad	2–1	1–2	1–0	2–1	0–0	5–2	1–0	1–0	1–0	0–2	

Legend: Blue = home team win; Yellow = draw; Red = away team win.

== Top scorers ==
14 goals

- Nikita Simonyan (Spartak Moscow)
- Avtandil Gogoberidze (Dinamo Tbilisi)

9 goals

- Vitali Vatskevich (Torpedo Moscow)

8 goals

- Georgi Borzenko (Lokomotiv Kharkov)
- Pyotr Katrovsky (Zenit Leningrad)
- Boris Tatushin (Spartak Moscow)

7 goals

- Aleksandr Gulevsky (Zenit Kuybyshev)
- Zaur Kaloyev (Dinamo Tbilisi)
- Mykhaylo Koman (Dynamo Kiev)
- Vladimir Savdunin (Dynamo Moscow)
