= FC Naftokhimik Kremenchuk =

Ukrainian football club based in Kremenchuk, Ukraine

FC Naftokhimik Kremenchuk is a Ukrainian amateur football club from Kremenchuk, Poltava Oblast.

The football team belonged to the Kremenchuk Oil Refinery and originally was called Naftovyk.

In 1985, there was created Kremin Kremenchuk which was based partially on the Naftovyk team and the football team of SC KrAZ.

In 1992 the club changed its name to Naftokhimik and was admitted to the 1992–93 Ukrainian Transitional League.

During 1996 due to lack of finances professional club was disbanded.

== League and cup history ==
Season	Div.	Pos.	Pl.	W	D	L	GS	GA	P	Domestic Cup	Europe	Notes
1989	Ukraine KFK "3"	9	24	7	8	9	33	34	22			
1990	Ukraine KFK "3"	8	30	14	8	8	36	28	36			
1991	Ukraine KFK "3"	4	28	16	6	6	43	20	38			Admitted to Transitional League
1992–93	4th	1	34	21	10	3	56	26	52	1/64 finals		Promoted
1993–94	3rd	4	42	24	7	11	69	41	55	1/16 finals		Promoted
1994–95	2nd	16	42	14	10	18	50	50	52	1/32 finals		
1995–96	2nd	15	42	16	7	19	43	45	55	1/16 finals		Folded

== Honours ==
Poltava Oblast Championship

Winners (1): 1992,

Poltava Oblast Cup

Winners (2): 1992, 1993
Runners-up (1): 1991

== Head coaches ==
- 1980 Viktor Berest
- 1984 Hryhorii Chychykov (playing head coach)
- 1985 Leonid Dyndikov
- 1986–1987 Ivan Shepelenko
- 1989–1991 Oleh Bystrytskyi
- 1992–1996 Mykhailo Byelykh
- Oleh Smolyaninov

== See also ==
- Mykhailo Byelykh

== Sources ==
- Lomov, Anatolii; Stadnychenko, Oleksandr (2009), 100 Років Полтавському Футболу [100 Years of Poltava Football] (in Ukrainian), Poltava: Poltava, ISBN 978-966-97035-0-7
