= Denys Smirnov =

Ukrainian footballer

Personal information
- Full name: Denys Smirnov
- Date of birth: 18 June 1975 (age 51)
- Place of birth: Ukraine, Soviet Union
- Height: 1.74 m (5 ft 8 1/2 in)
- Position: Midfielder

Youth career
- Metalurh Zaporizhzhia Youth

Senior career*
| Years | Team | Apps | (Gls) |
| 1994–1997 | Torpedo Zaporizhzhia | 95 | (12) |
| 1998–2002 | Metalurh Zaporizhzhia | 72 | (5) |
| 1998–2002 | → Metalurh-2 Zaporizhzhia | 15 | (6) |
| 2003 | Tavriya Simferopol | 27 | (2) |
| 2004 | Metalurh Zaporizhzhia | 4 | (0) |
| 2004 | Tavriya Simferopol | 11 | (0) |
| 2005 | Zakarpattia Uzhhorod | 27 | (2) |
| 2006–2009 | Metalurh Zaporizhzhia | 7 | (0) |
| 2006–2009 | → Metalurh-2 Zaporizhzhia | 6 | (1) |
| 2011 | Dynamo Khmelnytskyi | 7 | (1) |
- * Club domestic league appearances and goals

Denys Smirnov (born 18 June 1975) is a Ukrainian former professional football midfielder.

== Career ==
Denys Smirnov is a product of Metalurh Zaporizhzhia Youth school system, where he was trained by V. Ischenko. Smirnov gave his debut for the Metalurh Zaporizhzhia senior team on 13 March 1998 during a match versus rivals Nyva Ternopil during the Soviet Cup. Denys later moved to play for Tavriya Simferopol and Zakarpattia Uzhhorod, and during the 2008 season summer transfer moved back to play for Metalurh Zaporizhzhia during the month of July. For Metalurh Zaporizhzhia, Smirnov played 82 matches and scored 5 goals in addition to scoring 2 goals in 7 matches for the Ukrainian Cup.
