= 1954 Soviet Cup =

1954 Cup of USSR in Football
Кубок СССР

Tournament details
- Country: Soviet Union
- Dates: August 15 – October 20
- Teams: 67

Final positions
- Champions: Dinamo Kiev
- Runners-up: Spartak Yerevan

The 1954 Soviet Cup was an association football cup competition of the Soviet Union.

== Participating teams ==
Enter in First round
| Class A 13/13 teams | Class B 36/36 teams | | Republican 18 teams |
| ✓ Dinamo Moscow; ✓ Spartak Moscow; ✓ Spartak Minsk; ✓ Trudovye Rezervy Leningrad; ✓ Dinamo Kiev; ✓ CDSA Moscow; ✓ Zenit Leningrad; ✓ Dinamo Tbilisi; ✓ Torpedo Moscow; ✓ Lokomotiv Moscow; ✓ Krylia Sovetov Kuibyshev; ✓ Lokomotiv Kharkov; ✓ Torpedo Gorkiy | ✓ Spartak Yerevan; ✓ Neftianik Baku; ✓ ODO Tbilisi; ✓ Lokomotiv Alma-Ata; ✓ Leninabad; ✓ Avangard (Dzerzhinets) Chelyabinsk; ✓ Avangard Sverdlovsk; ✓ Spartak Ashkhabad; ✓ Spartak Tashkent; ✓ ODO Sverdlovsk; ✓ Iskra Frunze; ✓ Molotov; ✓ Zenit Moscow; ✓ Spartak Vilnius; ✓ Khimik Moscow; ✓ Krasnoye Znamia Ivanovo; ✓ Spartak Kalinin; ✓ Pischevik Minsk | ✓ Daugava Riga; ✓ Energiya Saratov; ✓ Voronezh; ✓ Shakhter Mosbass; ✓ Kalev Tallinn; ✓ Krasnaya Zvezda Petrozavodsk; ✓ Shakhter Stalino; ✓ Torpedo Rostov-na-Donu; ✓ Metallurg Zaporozhye; ✓ Metallurg Dnepropetrovsk; ✓ Spartak Uzhgorod; ✓ Metallurg Odessa; ✓ ODO Lvov; ✓ Torpedo Stalingrad; ✓ DOF Sevastopol; ✓ Neftianik Krasnodar; ✓ ODO Kiev; ✓ Burevestnik Kishenev | ✓ Dinamo Petrozavodsk (Karelia); ✓ Sokol Tallinn (Estonia); ✓ Krasny Metallurg Liyepaya (Latvia); ✓ Inkaras Kaunas (Lithuania); ✓ Torpedo Vitebsk (Belarus); ✓ Mashinostroitel Kiev (Ukraine); ✓ Lokomotiv Ungheni (Moldova); ✓ TTU Tbilisi (Georgia); ✓ Kirovakan (Armenia); ✓ Zavod im.Budennogo Baku (Azerbaijan); ✓ Dinamo Alma-Ata (Kazakhstan); ✓ ODO Tashkent (Uzbekistan); ✓ Profsoyuzy Kalininskoye (Kirgizia); ✓ Profsoyuzy Leninabad (Tajikistan); ✓ Urozhai Ashkhabad (Turkmenia); ✓ ODO Khabarovsk (RSFSR); ✓ Dinamo-2 Moscow; ✓ ODO Leningrad |

Source: []

== Competition schedule ==
=== First round ===
[Aug 15]
ISKRA Frunze                 11-1  ProfSoyuzy Frunze 
  [Churikov-3, Malyarenko-3, Zykov-3, Boikov-2 – Kolomiytsev] 
PROFSOYUZY Leninabad          4-3  Gornyak Leninabad 
SPARTAK Ashkhabad            12-1  Urozhai Ashkhabad 
  [Moroz-3, Yepikhin-3, Oganov-2, Maduntsev-2, Borkin-2 – Vorobyov] 
SPARTAK Tashkent              5-0  ODO Tashkent 
  [Tazetdinov-2, Vitkalov-2, Zhigalkin] 
[Aug 18] 
BUREVESTNIK Kishinev          3-2  Lokomotiv Ungeny 
  [Popov-2, Fomin – Petrov-2] 
Inkaras Kaunas                0-2  SPARTAK Vilnius 
  [Raimondas Beinoravicius, Romualdas Lutkevicius] 
KALEV Tallinn                 4-0  Sokol Tallinn 
  [Kuller-2, Ivanov, Kornev] 
KRASNAYA ZVEZDA Petrozavodsk  3-0  Dinamo Petrozavodsk 
  [Kornilov-2, Shelekhov] 
Krasny Metallurg Liepaja      0-1  DAUGAVA Riga 
  [Pavlovich 9] 
NEFTYANIK Baku                2-1  ZiB Baku 
  [Batashov-2 – Kevorkov] 
Neftyanik Krasnodar           1-2  SHAKHTYOR Mosbass 
  [? – I.Yakushkin, M.Petrov] 
[Aug 20] 
MASHINOSTROITEL Kiev          1-0  Krylya Sovetov Voronezh 
  [Romanovskiy] 
[Aug 25] 
LOKOMOTIV Alma-Ata            2-1  Dinamo Alma-Ata 
ODO Kiev                      w/o  ODO Sverdlovsk  
ODO Tbilisi                   2-0  TTU Tbilisi 
  [B.Koverznev, A.Norakidze] 
SPARTAK Yerevan               3-0  Kirovakan 
  [Boyajan, Beglaryan, Abramyan]

=== Second round ===
[Aug 17] 
METALLURG Dnepropetrovsk      6-0  Avangard Sverdlovsk 
  [Kolosov 19, Beletskiy 34, Didevich 42, 69, ?, Gurkin 56] 
Zenit Kaliningrad (M.R.)      1-4  SPARTAK Uzhgorod 
  [Stepanov – Kalinov, Preznanskiy] 
[Aug 18] 
DINAMO-2 Moskva               3-2  DOF Sevastopol 
  [Trofimov-2, Tsaritsyn – Muhamadeyev, Makhov] 
Krasnoye Znamya Ivanovo       1-3  SHAKHTYOR Stalino    [aet]  [in Moskva] 
  [E.Kapanakov – Alexandr Alpatov, A.Motin, Y.Zaitsev] 
TORPEDO Rostov-na-Donu        3-1  Spartak Kalinin 
  [A.Grigorov, V.Kruglov, Y.Zakharov – Klimakov] 
[Aug 20] 
ProfSoyuzy Leninabad          2-3  SPARTAK Tashkent        [aet] 
  [Chistov, Ivlev – Vitkalov, Breslavets, Tazetdinov] 
[Aug 22] 
ISKRA Frunze                  3-1  Spartak Ashkhabad 
  [Boikov-2, Churikov – Borkin] 
KRYLYA SOVETOV Molotov        2-1  Energiya Saratov 
  [Ratushny, Shavshunov – Larin] 
Neftyanik Baku                1-4  ODO Kiev 
  [Mikuchadze – Bondarenko-2, Fursov, A.Bogdanovich] 
[Aug 25] 
ODO Leningrad                 4-0  Avangard Chelyabinsk 
  [Salahadinov-2, Nell, Kulikov] 
[Aug 28] 
PISHCHEVIK Minsk              2-0  Torpedo Vitebsk 
  [V.Stadnikov, B.Gritsuk] 
SPARTAK Vilnius               2-0  Kalev Tallinn 
  [Raimondas Beinoravicius, Romualdas Lutkevicius] 
[Aug 29] 
Krasnaya Zvezda Petrozavodsk  1-2  BUREVESTNIK Kishinev 
  [Konstantinov – Mukhortov, Myndru] 
Mashinostroitel Kiev          0-0  Khimik Moskva 
ODO Lvov                      3-1  Metallurg Zaporozhye 
  [E.Tsitsei-2, Chepiga – Pavlov] 
ODO Tbilisi                   3-0  Daugava Riga 
  [A.Norakidze, D.Podlesny, B.Koverznev] 
[Sep 3] 
ODO Khabarovsk                w/o  Torpedo Stalingrad 
SHAKHTYOR Mosbass             2-0  Metallurg Odessa 
  [P.Smirnov, V.Uskov] 
SPARTAK Yerevan               w/o  Lokomotiv Alma-Ata

==== Second round replays ====
[Aug 30] 
Mashinostroitel Kiev          1-6  KHIMIK Moskva 
  [Kashlyk – Fyodorov-2, Papilov, Ryakhov, Rogov, Abramov]

=== Third round ===
[Aug 26] 
TORPEDO Gorkiy                4-2  Krylya Sovetov Molotov 
  [Vladimir Lazarev-2, Nikolai Matveyev, Nikolai Yefimov – Nikiforov, Viktor Belov (T) og] 
[Aug 27] 
LOKOMOTIV Moskva              4-0  Spartak Tashkent 
  [Ivan Larin, Alexandr Filyayev, Yuriy Korotkov, Zverinskiy (S) og] 
[Aug 29] 
ODO Leningrad                 3-2  Trudoviye Rezervy Leningrad 
  [Petsyunevich, Salahadinov, Vikhenskiy – Kolobov, Sochnev] 
[Aug 30] 
SPARTAK Moskva                3-1  Dinamo Moskva 
  [Nikolai Parshin 25, 64, Nikolai Dementyev 59 – Vladimir Ilyin 32] 
[Sep 5] 
Lokomotiv Kharkov             1-3  SPARTAK Uzhgorod 
  [P.Ponomarenko – Preznanskiy-2, D.Tovt] 
SPARTAK Minsk                 4-0  ODO Kiev 
  [Boris Kurnev 15, Vladilen Golubev 58 pen, Igor Bachurin 72, ?] 
[Sep 6] 
Pishchevik Minsk              0-3  KHIMIK Moskva                [aet] 
  [I.Abramov-2, G.Borisov] 
[Sep 7] 
BUREVESTNIK Kishinev          1-0  ODO Tbilisi                  [aet] 
  [Mikhail Mukhortov] 
Dinamo-2 Moskva               1-2  ZENIT Leningrad 
  [M.Shlyonov 30 – Yuriy Volodin 19, 63] 
[Sep 12] 
Shakhtyor Stalino             2-2  Dinamo Tbilisi 
  [Ivan Fedosov 9, Ivan Boboshko 48 – Boris Khasaia 46, Avtandil Gogoberidze 63] 
[Sep 15] 
Torpedo Rostov-na-Donu        0-4  CDSA Moskva 
  [Valentin Yemyshev-2, Anatoliy Savin, Vasiliy Buzunov] 
[Sep 16] 
DINAMO Kiev                   4-2  Spartak Vilnius 
  [Andrei Zazroyev 3, 9, 30, Georgiy Grammatikopulo 60 - Romualdas Lutkevicius 57, Raimondas Beinoravicius 70] 
[Sep 18] 
ODO Lvov                      3-2  Krylya Sovetov Kuibyshev 
  [E.Tsitsei, Pozdnyakov (K) og, Guzik (K) og – Viktor Voroshilov-2] 
[Sep 19] 
TORPEDO Moskva                3-0  ODO Khabarovsk 
  [Yuriy Zolotov-2, Anatoliy A.Ilyin] 
[Sep 23] 
METALLURG Dnepropetrovsk      w/o  Iskra Frunze 
Shakhtyor Mosbass             0-3  SPARTAK Yerevan 
  [Karajan-2, Abramyan]

==== Third round replays ====
[Sep 13] 
SHAKHTYOR Stalino             1-0  Dinamo Tbilisi 
  [Alexandr Alpatov]

=== Fourth round ===
[Sep 8] 
METALLURG Dnepropetrovsk      5-3  Torpedo Gorkiy 
  [Didevich 6, ?, Gurkin 9, Kozachenko 25, Gorovoi 90 – Nikolai Matveyev 31, Nikolai Yefimov ? pen, ? pen] 
[Sep 12] 
ODO Leningrad                 3-1  Burevestnik Kishinev 
  [Korolyov-2, Salahadinov – Danilov] 
[Sep 17] 
ZENIT Leningrad               2-0  Lokomotiv Moskva 
  [Vladimir Dobrikov ?, 71] 
[Sep 23] 
SHAKHTYOR Stalino             3-1  Spartak Uzhgorod 
  [Samoilov-2, Alexandr Alpatov – Tovt] 
[Sep 29] 
SPARTAK Yerevan               2-0  Spartak Minsk    
  [O.Abramyan, A.Boyajan] 
[Oct 1] 
ODO Lvov                      0-1  KHIMIK Moskva 
  [Fyodorov] 
[Oct 3] 
Spartak Moskva                1-3  DINAMO Kiev 
  [Anatoliy Isayev 26 – Mikhail Koman 41, 73, Andrei Zazroyev 51] 
[Oct 5] 
CDSA Moskva                   1-0  Torpedo Moskva               [aet] 
  [Boris Khrenov (T) 120 og]

=== Quarterfinals ===
[Sep 22] 
METALLURG Dnepropetrovsk      2-1  ODO Leningrad                [aet] 
  [Filatov ?, M.Gurkin 119 – Kulikov 87] 
[Oct 5] 
SPARTAK Yerevan               1-0  Shakhtyor Stalino 
  [A.Kegeyan 34] 
[Oct 6] 
ZENIT Leningrad               2-0  Khimik Moskva 
  [Pyotr Katrovskiy 12, Vladimir Dobrikov 65 pen] 
[Oct 12] 
DINAMO Kiev                   3-1  CDSA Moskva                  [aet] 
  [Mikhail Koman 1, 106, Viktor Fomin 120 – Valentin Yemyshev 75]

=== Semifinals ===
[Oct 11] 
SPARTAK Yerevan               4-0  Metallurg Dnepropetrovsk             [in Moskva] 
  [K.Vardanyan 1, 28, A.Kegeyan 31, Abramyan 57] 
[Oct 16] 
DINAMO Kiev                   1-0  Zenit Leningrad              [aet]   [in Moskva] 
  [Alexandr Koltsov 113]

=== Final ===
20 October 1954

| Dinamo Kiev | 2 – 1 | Spartak Yerevan |
|---|---|---|
| Terentyev 34'; Koman 67' | [ Report] | Merkulov 48' |

Moscow
