= Zoya Berezhna =

Ukrainian politician

- Зоя Бережна
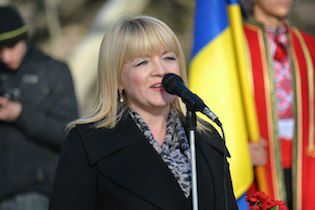
- Berezhna in 2013

Mayor of Kherson (acting)
- In office 12 December 2012 – 28 February 2014
- Preceded by: Vladimir Saldo
- Succeeded by: Volodymyr Mykolayenko

Secretary of the Kherson City Council
- In office 12 November 2010 – 28 February 2014
- Succeeded by: Volodymyr Mykolayenko

Personal details
- Born: Zoya Yakivna Berezhna; 3 October 1961 (age 64) Zalazko, Volyn Oblast, Ukrainian SSR, Soviet Union
- Party: Party of Regions

Zoya Yakivna Berezhna (Ukrainian: Зоя Яківна Бережна; born on 3 October 1961), is a Ukrainian politician who had served as the mayor of Kherson from 2012 to 2014. She also served as the secretary of the Kherson City Council from 2010 to 2014.

== Biography ==
Zoya Berezhna was born in the village of Zalazko in Volyn.

In 1983, she graduated from the Kherson Pedagogical Institute, majoring in Russian language and literature teacher. Until 1984, she worked as a teacher at the Tyagin school (Beryslav district).

From 1986 to 1998, she held the position of deputy director for educational work at secondary school No. 9 in Kherson. In parallel with this, from 1994 to 1998, she was a deputy of the Komsomol District Council in Kherson.

Since 1998, she has been a deputy of the Kherson City Council. From 1998 to 2002, she was the Chief Specialist of the Department for Coordination of Humanitarian Policy of the Ministry of Education and Culture.

On 12 November 2010, Berezhna was elected as the secretary of the Kherson City Council, and on 12 December 2012, after Mayor of Kherson Vladimir Saldo, became a people's deputy and resigned as mayor, Berezhna, in accordance with the law, temporarily performs the duties of the Kherson city mayor.

On 28 February 2014, Berzehna left the position of secretary of the city council, and acting Mayor of Kherson. The new secretary of the city council, Volodymyr Mykolayenko was elected mayor of Kherson.
