= Oleh Krasnopyorov =

Ukrainian footballer (born 1980)

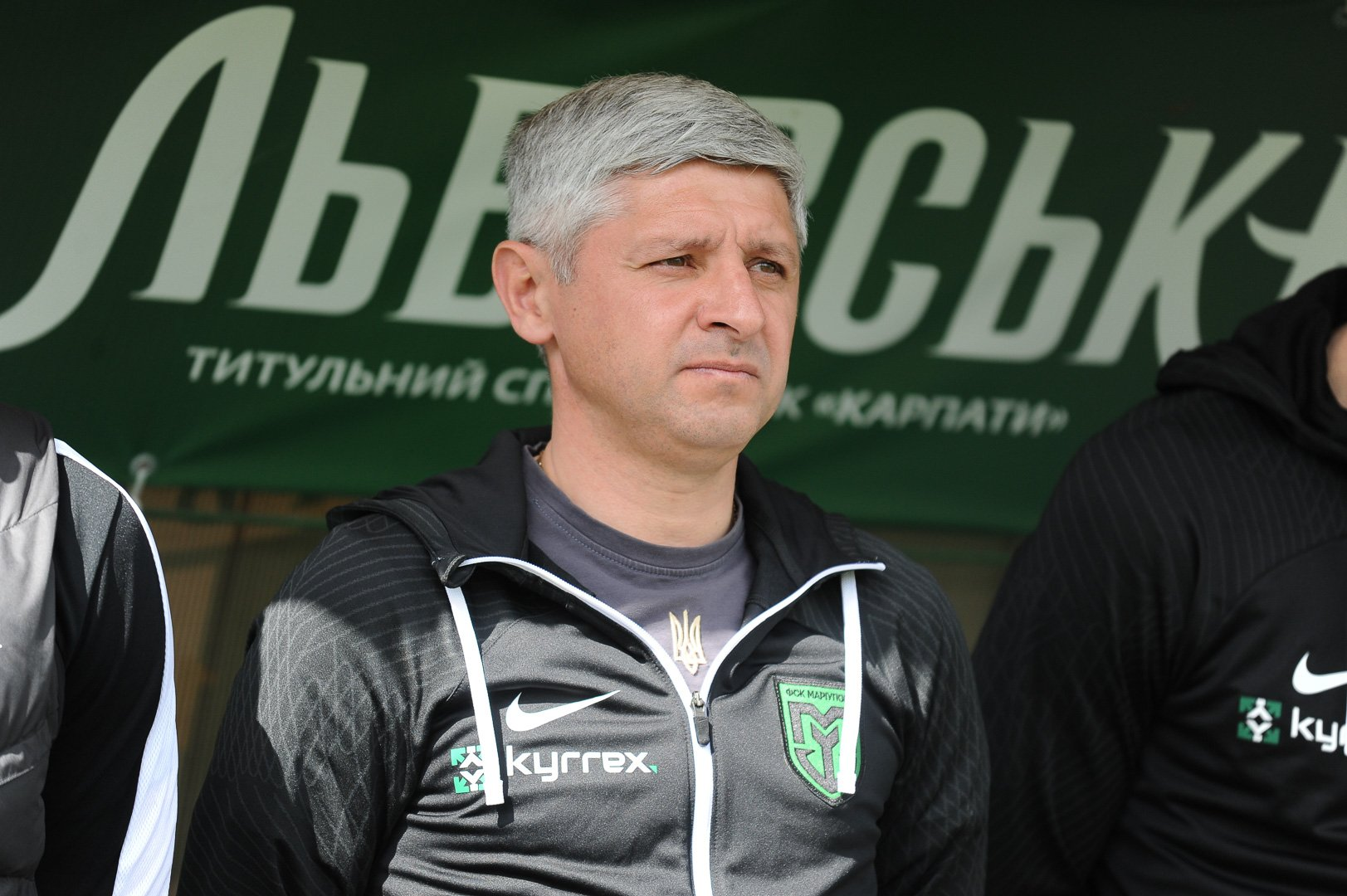

Personal information
- Full name: Oleh Volodymyrovych Krasnopyorov
- Date of birth: 25 July 1980 (age 46)
- Place of birth: Poltava, Ukrainian SSR
- Height: 1.72 m (5 ft 8 in)
- Positions: Defensive midfielder; right-back

Team information
- Current team: Dnister Zalishchyky (manager)

Youth career
- Vorskla Poltava

Senior career*
Years	Team	Apps	(Gls)
1998–2000	Vorskla Poltava	0	(0)
1998–1999	→ Vorskla-2 Poltava	19	(0)
1999–2000	→ Adoms Kremenchuk (loan)	23	(9)
2000–2002	Dynamo Kyiv	0	(0)
2000–2001	→ Dynamo-2 Kyiv	26	(1)
2000–2001	→ Dynamo-3 Kyiv	10	(2)
2001–2002	→ Zakarpattia Uzhhorod (loan)	25	(1)
2001–2002	→ Zakarpattia-2 Uzhhorod (loan)	1	(0)
2002–2008	Illichivets Mariupol	132	(3)
2004	→ Illichivets-2 Mariupol	3	(0)
2008–2013	Vorskla Poltava	124	(3)
2013–2015	Metalist Kharkiv	40	(0)
Total		403	(19)

International career
2008–2010	Ukraine	3	(0)

Managerial career
- 2018–2019: Vorskla Poltava (U19)
- 2019–2020: Vorskla Poltava (U21)
- 2020: Vorskla Poltava (U19)
- 2021–2025: Mariupol
- 2025–: Dnister Zalishchyky
- * Club domestic league appearances and goals

Oleh Volodymyrovych Krasnopyorov (Ukrainian: Олег Володимирович Краснопьоров; born 25 July 1980) is a Ukrainian football manager and former player

== Career ==
A defensive midfielder and right-back, Krasnopyorov played for Metalist Kharkiv in the Ukrainian Premier League. He moved to Metalist Kharkiv from Vorskla Poltava in January 2013 during the 2012–13 winter transfer season.

Krasnopyorov made one appearance for the Ukraine national team, in a friendly match against Norway on 19 November 2008.
