= 1953 Football Championship of the Ukrainian SSR =

Football Championship of UkrSSR
- Season: 1953
- Champions: Spartak Uzhhorod

The 1953 Football Championship of UkrSSR were part of the 1953 Soviet republican football competitions in the Soviet Ukraine.

== Qualification group stage ==
=== Group 1 ===
| Pos | Team | Pld | W | D | L | GF | GA | GD | Pts |
|---|---|---|---|---|---|---|---|---|---|
| 1 | Dynamo Proskuriv | 10 | 6 | 1 | 3 | 27 | 16 | +11 | 13 |
| 2 | Dynamo Zhytomyr | 10 | 5 | 3 | 2 | 18 | 16 | +2 | 13 |
| 3 | Dynamo Chernivtsi | 10 | 5 | 2 | 3 | 15 | 11 | +4 | 12 |
| 4 | Dynamo Rivne | 10 | 4 | 2 | 4 | 19 | 16 | +3 | 10 |
| 5 | Dynamo Ternopil | 10 | 4 | 2 | 4 | 12 | 18 | −6 | 10 |
| 6 | Torpedo Fastiv | 10 | 1 | 0 | 9 | 7 | 21 | −14 | 2 |

=== Group 2 ===
| Pos | Team | Pld | W | D | L | GF | GA | GD | Pts |
|---|---|---|---|---|---|---|---|---|---|
| 1 | Torpedo Kharkiv | 10 | 7 | 1 | 2 | 23 | 12 | +11 | 15 |
| 2 | Khimik Dniprodzerzhynsk | 10 | 6 | 2 | 2 | 21 | 9 | +12 | 14 |
| 3 | Lokomotyv Kyiv | 10 | 6 | 0 | 4 | 25 | 19 | +6 | 12 |
| 4 | Lokomotyv Poltava | 10 | 5 | 1 | 4 | 25 | 18 | +7 | 11 |
| 5 | Torpedo Sumy | 10 | 2 | 2 | 6 | 9 | 24 | −15 | 6 |
| 6 | Torpedo Pryluky | 10 | 0 | 2 | 8 | 6 | 27 | −21 | 2 |

=== Group 3 ===
| Pos | Team | Pld | W | D | L | GF | GA | GD | Pts |
|---|---|---|---|---|---|---|---|---|---|
| 1 | Metalurh Zhdanov | 10 | 5 | 4 | 1 | 14 | 7 | +7 | 14 |
| 2 | Mashynobudivnyk Dnipropetrovsk | 10 | 6 | 2 | 2 | 15 | 11 | +4 | 14 |
| 3 | Shakhtar Kadiivka | 10 | 3 | 5 | 2 | 18 | 16 | +2 | 11 |
| 4 | Torpedo Kirovohrad | 10 | 4 | 1 | 5 | 17 | 20 | −3 | 9 |
| 5 | Lokomotyv Artemivsk | 10 | 2 | 2 | 6 | 12 | 14 | −2 | 6 |
| 6 | Mashynobudivnyk Zaporizhia | 10 | 2 | 2 | 6 | 12 | 20 | −8 | 6 |

=== Group 4 ===
| Pos | Team | Pld | W | D | L | GF | GA | GD | Pts |
|---|---|---|---|---|---|---|---|---|---|
| 1 | Spartak Kherson | 10 | 9 | 0 | 1 | 32 | 9 | +23 | 18 |
| 2 | Mashynobudivnyk Kyiv | 10 | 8 | 0 | 2 | 22 | 8 | +14 | 16 |
| 3 | Vodnyk Mykolaiv | 10 | 4 | 0 | 6 | 12 | 6 | +6 | 8 |
| 4 | Shakhtar Odesa | 10 | 3 | 1 | 6 | 11 | 16 | −5 | 7 |
| 5 | Dynamo Izmail | 10 | 3 | 0 | 7 | 8 | 26 | −18 | 6 |
| 6 | Trud Vinnytsia | 10 | 2 | 1 | 7 | 3 | 23 | −20 | 5 |

=== Group 5 ===
| Pos | Team | Pld | W | D | L | GF | GA | GD | Pts |
|---|---|---|---|---|---|---|---|---|---|
| 1 | Spartak Uzhhorod | 10 | 7 | 1 | 2 | 43 | 12 | +31 | 15 |
| 2 | Spartak Stanislav | 10 | 5 | 3 | 2 | 14 | 15 | −1 | 13 |
| 3 | Dynamo Lviv | 10 | 4 | 2 | 4 | 18 | 21 | −3 | 10 |
| 4 | Iskra Mukacheve | 10 | 4 | 1 | 5 | 20 | 9 | +11 | 9 |
| 5 | Dynamo Lutsk | 10 | 3 | 2 | 5 | 10 | 31 | −21 | 8 |
| 6 | Naftovyk Drohobych | 10 | 2 | 1 | 7 | 11 | 28 | −17 | 5 |

== Final ==
| Pos | Team | Pld | W | D | L | GF | GA | GD | Pts | Promotion or relegation |
|---|---|---|---|---|---|---|---|---|---|---|
| 1 | FC Spartak Uzhhorod | 4 | 4 | 0 | 0 | 18 | 2 | +16 | 8 | Promoted |
| 2 | FC Spartak Kherson | 4 | 2 | 1 | 1 | 9 | 8 | +1 | 5 | |
| 3 | FC Torpedo Kharkiv | 4 | 2 | 0 | 2 | 7 | 13 | −6 | 4 | |
| 4 | FC Dynamo Proskuriv | 4 | 1 | 0 | 3 | 2 | 7 | −5 | 2 | |
| 5 | FC Metalurh Zhdanov | 4 | 0 | 1 | 3 | 2 | 8 | −6 | 1 | |

== Ukrainian clubs at the All-Union level ==
- Class A (2): Dynamo Kyiv, Lokomotyv Kharkiv
- Class B (4): Shakhtar Stalino, Metalurh Odesa, Metalurh Zaporizhia, Metalurh Dnipropetrovsk

== Number of teams by region ==
| Number | Region | Team(s) | |
| Number | Region | Ukrainian SSR | All-Union |
|---|---|---|---|
| 3 (1) | Kyiv Oblast | Torpedo Fastiv, Lokomotyv Kyiv, Mashynobudivnyk Kyiv | Dynamo Kyiv |
| 2 (1) | Donetsk Oblast | Metalurh Zhdanov, Lokomotyv Artemivsk | Stakhanovets Stalino |
| 2 (1) | Dnipropetrovsk Oblast | Khimik Dniprodzerzhynsk, Mashynobudivnyk Dnipropetrovsk | Metalurh Dnipropetrovsk |
| 2 (0) | Zakarpattia Oblast | Spartak Uzhhorod, Iskra Mukachevo | – |
| 1 (1) | Odesa Oblast | Shakhtar Odesa | Metalurh Odesa |
| 1 (1) | Kharkiv Oblast | Torpedo Kharkiv | Lokomotyv Kharkiv |
| 1 (1) | Zaporizhia Oblast | Mashynobudivnyk Zaporizhia | Metalurh Zaporizhia |
| 1 (0) | Luhansk Oblast | Shakhtar Kadiivka | – |
| 1 (0) | Lviv Oblast | Dynamo Lviv | – |
| 1 (0) | Mykolaiv Oblast | Vodnyk Mykolaiv | – |
| 1 (0) | Sumy Oblast | Torpedo Sumy | – |
| 1 (0) | Chernihiv Oblast | Torpedo Pryluky | – |
| 1 (0) | Kirovohrad Oblast | Torpedo Kirovohrad | – |
| 1 (0) | (Soviet Union) Drohobych Oblast | Naftovyk Drohobych | – |
| 1 (0) | Poltava Oblast | Lokomotyv Poltava | – |
| 1 (0) | Vinnytsia Oblast | Trud Vinnytsia | – |
| 1 (0) | Ivano-Frankivsk Oblast | Spartak Stanislav | – |
| 1 (0) | Zhytomyr Oblast | Dynamo Zhytomyr | – |
| 1 (0) | Kherson Oblast | Spartak Kherson | – |
| 1 (0) | Chernivtsi Oblast | Dynamo Chernivtsi | – |
| 1 (0) | Rivne Oblast | Dynamo Rivne | – |
| 1 (0) | Volyn Oblast | Dynamo Lutsk | – |
| 1 (0) | Khmelnytskyi Oblast | Dynamo Proskuriv | – |
| 1 (0) | (Soviet Union) Izmail Oblast | Dynamo Izmail | – |
| 1 (0) | Ternopil Oblast | Dynamo Ternopil | – |
