= FC Avtomobilist Lviv =

FC Avtomobilist Lviv was a football club based in Lviv, Ukraine.

== History ==
The club was founded in 1960s and disappeared with the fall of the Soviet Union.

== Honors ==
Ukrainian Cup for collective teams of physical culture

- Holders: (1): 1985,

Lviv Oblast football championship

- Winners (1): 1982,
- Runners-up (2): 1988, 1990,

== See also ==
- LVVPU
