= FC Mashynobudivnyk Druzhkivka =

Mashynobudivnyk Druzhkivka
- Founded: 1938
- Dissolved: 2002
- Ground: Mashynobudivnyk Stadium, Druzhkivka, Ukraine

FC Mashynobudivnyk Druzhkivka was a Ukrainian football club from Druzhkivka, Donetsk Oblast. They were playing in the Ukrainian Second League before they disbanded.
