= 1989 Soviet Second League =

Second League
- Season: 1989

1989 Soviet Second League was a Soviet competition in the Soviet Second League (III tier).

It was conducted in two stages and included 195 teams. At first stage all participants were divided in 9 groups by geographical principle across the whole Soviet Union. The winners of groups would qualify to the second and final stage where they were split in three groups of three. Winners of each group in the final stage received promotion to the 1990 Soviet First League.

In addition to that the league was expected to be reduced to only three groups next season while worse teams would be relegated to the newly revived IV tier.

== Zonal tournament ==
=== Zone I (Central) ===
Pos	Team	Pld	W	D	L	GF	GA	GD	Pts
1	Krylya Sovetov Kuibyshev	42	28	8	6	79	32	+47	64
2	Sokol Saratov	42	25	13	4	88	33	+55	63
3	Torpedo Ryazan	42	24	11	7	57	27	+30	59
4	Torpedo Vladimir	42	21	15	6	61	25	+36	57
5	Zarya Kaluga	42	21	14	7	52	26	+26	56
6	Iskra Smolensk	42	19	17	6	60	36	+24	55
7	Textilshchik Ivanovo	42	20	9	13	56	47	+9	49
8	Znamya Truda Orekhovo-Zuyevo	42	18	9	15	58	47	+11	45
9	Volga Kalinin	42	17	11	14	54	49	+5	45
10	Saturn Ramenskoye	42	15	15	12	57	51	+6	45
11	Dinamo Vologda	42	15	15	12	46	43	+3	45
12	Dinamo-2 Moskva	42	10	21	11	45	44	+1	41
13	Spartak Kostroma	42	13	13	16	50	52	−2	39
14	Volzhanin Kineshma	42	13	11	18	38	52	−14	37
15	Arsenal Tula	42	15	6	21	41	46	−5	36
16	Khimik Cherepovets	42	12	11	19	34	53	−19	35
17	Oka Kolomna	42	12	8	22	50	95	−45	32
18	Zorkiy Krasnogorsk	42	12	7	23	39	67	−28	31
19	Krasnaya Presnya Moskva	42	11	9	22	44	62	−18	31
20	Chaika-CSKA-2 Moskva	42	6	11	25	39	77	−38	23
21	SK ESVSM Moskva	42	7	5	30	38	73	−35	19
22	Saturn Rybinsk	42	4	9	29	28	77	−49	17

=== Zone II (Volga/Ural) ===
Pos	Team	Pld	W	D	L	GF	GA	GD	Pts	
1	Lokomotiv Gorkiy	42	31	7	4	84	20	+64	69	Qualified for promotional playoffs 1990 First League
2	UralMash Sverdlovsk	42	29	10	3	81	14	+67	68	
3	Zenit Izhevsk	42	26	11	5	73	22	+51	63	
4	Gastello Ufa	42	23	8	11	63	29	+34	54	
5	Zvezda Perm	42	22	6	14	63	35	+28	50	
6	Start Ulyanovsk	42	20	9	13	56	30	+26	49	
7	Torpedo Naberezhnyye Chelny	42	20	8	14	59	50	+9	48	
8	Torpedo Kurgan	42	20	8	14	49	38	+11	48	
9	Druzhba Yoshkar-Ola	42	19	9	14	60	44	+16	47	
10	Dinamo Kirov	42	19	8	15	50	40	+10	46	
11	Uralets Nizhniy Tagil	42	17	11	14	46	49	−3	45	
12	Rubin Kazan	42	18	4	20	42	41	+1	40	
13	Torpedo Miass	42	14	12	16	46	54	−8	40	
14	Lada Togliatti	42	14	12	16	46	42	+4	40	
15	Khimik Dzerzhinsk	42	14	10	18	40	58	−18	38	
16	Metallurg Magnitogorsk	42	13	11	18	40	59	−19	37	
17	Svetotekhnika Saransk	42	13	7	22	43	73	−30	33	
18	Stal Cheboksary	42	10	13	19	28	47	−19	33	
19	Strela Chelyabinsk	42	10	5	27	30	73	−43	25	
20	MCOP-Metallurg Sverdlovsk	42	5	10	27	23	65	−42	20	
21	Progress Orenburg	42	7	3	32	34	110	−76	17	
22	SVSM-SKA Kuibyshev	42	2	10	30	16	79	−63	14	

=== Zone III (South) ===
Pos	Rep	Team	Pld	W	D	L	GF	GA	GD	Pts	
1	RUS	Cement Novorossiysk	42	30	2	10	92	32	+60	62	Qualified for promotional playoffs 1990 Buffer League, Zone Center
2	RUS	Mashuk Pyatigorsk	42	26	4	12	67	40	+27	56	1990 Buffer League, Zone Center
3	RUS	Terek Grozny	42	23	8	11	76	41	+35	54	1990 Buffer League, Zone Center
4	RUS	Volgar Astrakhan	42	23	6	13	59	41	+18	52	1990 Buffer League, Zone Center
5	RUS	Druzhba Maykop	42	23	6	13	72	48	+24	52	1990 Buffer League, Zone Center
6	ARM	Lori Kirovakan	42	23	5	14	66	54	+12	51	1990 Buffer League, Zone West
7	RUS	Spartak Nalchik	42	21	7	14	69	40	+29	49	1990 Buffer League, Zone West
8	RUS	Torpedo Taganrog	42	18	10	14	52	43	+9	46	1990 Lower League
9	RUS	Spartak Oryol	42	18	9	15	49	44	+5	45	1990 Lower League
10	RUS	Spartak Anapa	42	16	12	14	48	37	+11	44	1990 Lower League
11	ARM	Shirak Leninakan	42	15	12	15	31	48	−17	42	1990 Buffer League, Zone West
12	ARM	Spitak	42	18	4	20	53	62	−9	40	1990 Lower League
13	RUS	Uralan Elista	42	13	12	17	58	61	−3	38	1990 Lower League
14	RUS	MCOP-Khimik Belorechensk	42	15	6	21	39	51	−12	36	1990 Lower League
15	RUS	Salyut Belgorod	42	12	11	19	40	55	−15	35	1990 Lower League
16	RUS	Signal Izobilny	42	13	8	21	41	69	−28	34	1990 Lower League
17	RUS	Avangard Kursk	42	12	10	20	40	61	−21	34	1990 Lower League
18	RUS	Shakhtyor Shakhty	42	13	7	22	39	61	−22	33	1990 Lower League
19	ARM	Prometheus Yerevan	42	13	7	22	48	57	−9	33	1990 Lower League
20	ARM	Spartak Oktemberyan	42	13	7	22	46	80	−34	33	1990 Lower League
21	RUS	Khimik Semiluki	42	8	15	19	42	55	−13	31	1990 Lower League
22	RUS	Luch Azov	42	6	12	24	27	74	−47	24	1990 Lower League

=== Zone IV (Far East) ===
Pos	Team	Pld	W	D	L	GF	GA	GD	Pts	
1	Irtysh Omsk	36	20	10	6	54	18	+36	50	Qualified for promotional playoffs 1990 Buffer League, Zone East
2	Zvezda Irkutsk	36	20	8	8	71	35	+36	48	1990 Buffer League, Zone East
3	Dinamo Barnaul	36	20	5	11	61	33	+28	45	1990 Buffer League, Zone East
4	Okean Nakhodka	36	17	10	9	50	30	+20	44	1990 Buffer League, Zone East
5	Amur Blagoveshchensk	36	17	9	10	55	39	+16	43	1990 Buffer League, Zone East
6	Luch Vladivostok	36	18	6	12	50	38	+12	42	1990 Lower League
7	Lokomotiv Chita	36	16	10	10	56	37	+19	42	1990 Lower League
8	Chkalovets Novosibirsk	36	17	6	13	47	38	+9	40	1990 Lower League
9	Metallurg Novokuznetsk	36	15	10	11	57	44	+13	40	1990 Lower League
10	Tom Tomsk	36	16	7	13	39	34	+5	39	1990 Lower League
11	Vulkan Petropavlovsk-Kamchatskiy	36	15	9	12	47	41	+6	39	1990 Lower League
12	SKA Khabarovsk	36	15	8	13	37	38	−1	38	1990 Lower League
13	Torpedo Rubtsovsk	36	13	7	16	38	53	−15	33	1990 Lower League
14	Avtomobilist Krasnoyarsk	36	12	8	16	36	51	−15	32	1990 Lower League
15	Amur Komsomolsk-na-Amure	36	10	11	15	41	58	−17	31	1990 Lower League
16	Progress Biysk	36	11	7	18	37	50	−13	29	1990 Lower League
17	Selenga Ulan-Ude	36	10	8	18	34	62	−28	28	1990 Lower League
18	Sakhalin Yuzhno-Sakhalinsk	36	5	8	23	22	70	−48	18	1990 Lower League
19	Sayany Abakan	36	0	3	33	8	71	−63	3	Withdrew

=== Zone V (Soviet Republics) ===
Pos	Rep	Team	Pld	W	D	L	GF	GA	GD	Pts	
1	MDA	Textilshchik Tiraspol	42	30	6	6	81	29	+52	66	Qualified for promotional playoffs 1990 First League
2	RUS	Dinamo Bryansk	42	25	10	7	89	48	+41	60	1990 Buffer League, Zone Center
3	UKR	Karpaty Lviv	42	24	10	8	63	34	+29	58	1990 Buffer League, Zone West
4	RUS	Baltika Kaliningrad	42	23	10	9	75	51	+24	56	1990 Buffer League, Zone West
5	RUS	Metallurg Lipetsk	42	20	12	10	46	22	+24	52	1990 Buffer League, Zone Center
6	AZE	Artsakh Stepanakert	42	20	8	14	74	49	+25	48	1990 Lower League
7	BLR	Dinamo Brest	42	19	10	13	53	51	+2	48	1990 Buffer League, Zone West
8	LTU	Atlantas Klaipeda	42	20	7	15	81	58	+23	47	Baltic League/Dissolved
9	BLR	Dnepr Mogilyov	42	19	7	16	52	47	+5	45	1990 Buffer League, Zone West
10	BLR	Khimik Grodno	42	18	8	16	46	41	+5	44	1990 Buffer League, Zone West
11	MDA	Zarya Beltsy	42	17	10	15	49	47	+2	44	1990 Buffer League, Zone West
12	RUS	Spartak Tambov	42	18	7	17	47	43	+4	43	1990 Lower League
13	BLR	KIM Vitebsk	42	17	8	17	41	47	−6	42	1990 Lower League
14	BLR	GomSelMash Gomel	42	17	7	18	39	46	−7	41	1990 Lower League
15	RUS	Kirovets Leningrad	42	14	13	15	40	40	0	41	1990 Lower League
16	MDA	Tigina-RSVSM Bendery	42	15	10	17	59	71	−12	40	1990 Lower League
17	UKR	Desna Chernihiv	42	14	8	20	39	54	−15	36	1990 Lower League
18	LVA	RSVSM-RAF Jelgava	42	10	9	23	38	62	−24	29	1990 Lower League
19	LVA	Zvejnieks Liepaja	42	5	16	21	28	59	−31	26	1990 Lower League
20	EST	Sport Tallinn	42	8	7	27	39	86	−47	23	Baltic League
21	RUS	Dinamo Leningrad	42	5	12	25	39	88	−49	22	1990 Lower League
22	LTU	SVSM-Inkaras Kaunas	42	4	5	33	23	68	−45	13	Baltic League

=== Zone VI (Ukraine) ===
Pos	Team	Pld	W	D	L	GF	GA	GD	Pts	Qualification or relegation
1	Volyn Lutsk (C)	52	32	14	6	84	38	+46	78	Qualified for promotional playoffs 1990 Buffer League, Zone West
2	Bukovyna Chernivtsi	52	29	18	5	71	26	+45	76	1990 Buffer League, Zone West
3	Nyva Ternopil	52	29	12	11	78	45	+33	70	1990 Buffer League, Zone West
4	Zorya Voroshylovhrad	52	27	14	11	94	59	+35	68	1990 Buffer League, Zone West
5	Nyva Vinnytsia	52	25	15	12	75	40	+35	65	1990 Buffer League, Zone West
6	Kremin Kremenchuk	52	21	18	13	59	50	+9	60	1990 Buffer League, Zone West
7	SKA Odesa	52	17	25	10	58	44	+14	59	1990 Buffer League, Zone West
8	Vorskla Poltava	52	24	10	18	62	55	+7	58	1990 Buffer League, Zone West
9	Zakarpattia Uzhhorod	52	25	7	20	59	64	−5	57	1990 Buffer League, Zone West
10	Kryvbas Kryvyi Rih	52	23	10	19	77	69	+8	56	1990 Lower League, Zone 1
11	Podillya Khmelnytskyi	52	24	7	21	64	57	+7	55	1990 Lower League, Zone 1
12	Kolos Nikopol	52	21	12	19	67	55	+12	54	1990 Lower League, Zone 1
13	Torpedo Zaporizhia	52	19	12	21	51	62	−11	50	1990 Lower League, Zone 1
14	Zirka Kirovohrad	52	16	17	19	44	52	−8	49	1990 Lower League, Zone 1
15	Polissya Zhytomyr	52	16	16	20	59	62	−3	48	1990 Lower League, Zone 1
16	Naftovyk Okhtyrka	52	16	16	20	56	60	−4	48	1990 Lower League, Zone 1
17	Dnipro Cherkasy	52	15	16	21	64	79	−15	46	1990 Lower League, Zone 1
18	Sudnobudivnyk Mykolaiv	52	15	16	21	61	66	−5	46	1990 Lower League, Zone 1
19	Avanhard Rivne	52	14	17	21	39	41	−2	45	1990 Lower League, Zone 1
20	Mayak Kharkiv	52	17	10	25	32	57	−25	44	1990 Lower League, Zone 1
21	Prykarpattia Ivano-Frankivsk	52	16	12	24	51	68	−17	44	1990 Lower League, Zone 1
22	Chaika Sevastopol	52	15	14	23	57	79	−22	44	1990 Lower League, Zone 1
23	Dynamo Bila Tserkva	52	15	13	24	56	72	−16	43	1990 Lower League, Zone 1
24	Okean Kerch	52	15	9	28	50	70	−20	39	1990 Lower League, Zone 1
25	Krystal Kherson	52	13	10	29	63	84	−21	36	1990 Lower League, Zone 1
26	Shakhtar Pavlohrad	52	13	7	32	57	105	−48	33	1990 Lower League, Zone 1
27	Novator Mariupol (R)	52	12	9	31	51	80	−29	33	Relegation to the Fitness clubs competitions (KFK)

(C) Champions; (R) Relegated

=== Zone VII (Central Asia) ===
Pos	Rep	Team	Pld	W	D	L	GF	GA	GD	Pts	
1	UZB	Neftyanik Fergana	40	26	7	7	89	28	+61	59	Qualified for promotional playoffs 1990 Buffer League, Zone East
2	UZB	Novbahor Namangan	40	24	7	9	69	39	+30	55	1990 Buffer League, Zone East
3	UZB	Yeshlik Jizak	40	21	8	11	62	39	+23	50	1990 Buffer League, Zone East
4	TJK	Vakhsh Kurgan-Tyube	40	20	9	11	62	38	+24	49	1990 Buffer League, Zone East
5	UZB	Avtomobilist Kokand	40	19	10	11	52	36	+16	48	1990 Buffer League, Zone East
6	UZB	Spartak Andizhan	40	21	5	14	79	53	+26	47	1990 Buffer League, Zone East
7	UZB	Surhan Termez	40	19	9	12	48	34	+14	47	1990 Buffer League, Zone East
8	TKM	Kopet-Dag Ashkhabad	40	19	9	12	65	37	+28	47	1990 Buffer League, Zone East
9	AZE	Araz Nahichevan	40	21	2	17	61	48	+13	44	1990 Lower League
10	UZB	Zarafshan Navoi	40	16	11	13	40	42	−2	43	1990 Buffer League, Zone East
11	UZB	Kasansayets Kasansay	40	17	7	16	63	56	+7	41	1990 Lower League
12	UZB	Traktor Tashkent	40	14	12	14	34	44	−10	40	1990 Lower League
13	UZB	Dinamo Samarkand	40	15	9	16	53	52	+1	39	1990 Lower League
14	UZB	Tselinnik Turtkul	40	15	8	17	49	60	−11	38	1990 Lower League
15	UZB	Yangiyer	40	15	7	18	42	68	−26	37	1990 Lower League
16	UZB	Jeyhun Urgench	40	15	7	18	42	59	−17	37	1990 Lower League
17	TKM	Ahal-COP Akdashayak	40	13	7	20	53	62	−9	33	1990 Lower League
18	TJK	Hojent Leninabad	40	10	8	22	41	69	−28	28	1990 Lower League
19	UZB	Selmashevets Chirchik	40	9	8	23	25	51	−26	26	1990 Lower League
20	UZB	SKA-RSVSM Tashkent Region	40	9	2	29	31	76	−45	20	1990 Lower League
21	UZB	Sohibkor Halkabad	40	4	4	32	25	94	−69	12	1990 Lower League

=== Zone VIII (Kazakhstan) ===
Pos	Rep	Team	Pld	W	D	L	GF	GA	GD	Pts	
1		Traktor Pavlodar	34	25	3	6	82	25	+57	53	Qualified for promotional playoffs 1990 Buffer League, Zone East
2	KGZ	Alga Frunze	34	23	6	5	87	26	+61	52	1990 Buffer League, Zone East
3		Tselinnik Tselinograd	34	23	6	5	49	21	+28	52	1990 Buffer League, Zone East
4		Meliorator Chimkent	34	21	7	6	52	27	+25	49	1990 Buffer League, Zone East
5		Shakhtyor Karaganda	34	20	3	11	46	35	+11	43	1990 Buffer League, Zone East
6		Khimik Jambul	34	18	5	11	59	44	+15	41	1990 Buffer League, Zone East
7		Meliorator Kzil-Orda	34	17	7	10	47	27	+20	41	1990 Buffer League, Zone East
8		Ekibastuzets Ekibastuz	34	16	9	9	50	35	+15	41	1990 Buffer League, Zone East
9		Spartak Semipalatinsk	34	15	6	13	49	43	+6	36	1990 Lower League
10		Aktyubinets Aktyubinsk	34	13	8	13	35	34	+1	34	1990 Lower League
11		Energetik Kustanay	34	13	7	14	33	38	−5	33	1990 Lower League
12		Vostok Ust-Kamenogorsk	34	14	4	16	60	49	+11	32	1990 Lower League
13	KGZ	Alay Osh	34	12	3	19	42	64	−22	27	1990 Lower League
14		Jezkazganets Jezkazgan	34	9	8	17	23	52	−29	26	1990 Lower League
15		Zhetysu Taldy-Kurgan	34	10	2	22	50	72	−22	22	1990 Lower League
16		Avangard Petropavlovsk	34	8	2	24	25	68	−43	18	1990 Lower League
17		Uralets Uralsk	34	2	4	28	16	72	−56	8	1990 Lower League
18		RSVSM Alma-Ata	34	1	2	31	23	96	−73	4	Withdrew

=== Zone IX (Caucasus) ===
Pos	Rep	Team	Pld	W	D	L	GF	GA	GD	Pts	
1	GEO	Dinamo Sukhumi	42	29	7	6	92	35	+57	65	Qualified for promotional playoffs 1990 First League
2	GEO	Kolkheti Poti	42	25	8	9	71	35	+36	58	Withdrew; Joined Georgian League
3	RUS	Textilshchik Kamyshin	42	24	9	9	83	32	+51	57	1990 Buffer League, Zone Center
4	GEO	Lokomotiv Samtredia	42	23	8	11	73	48	+25	54	Withdrew; Joined Georgian League
5	GEO	Kolkheti Khobi	42	22	9	11	66	51	+15	53	Withdrew; Joined Georgian League
6	GEO	Dila Gori	42	23	6	13	89	59	+30	52	Withdrew; Joined Georgian League
7	RUS	Nart Cherkessk	42	23	4	15	72	48	+24	50	1990 Buffer League, Zone Center
8	AZE	Goyazan Kazakh	42	22	4	16	63	49	+14	48	1990 Buffer League, Zone Center
9	AZE	Kyapaz Gyanja	42	21	6	15	70	54	+16	48	1990 Buffer League, Zone Center
10	RUS	Zvezda Gorodishche	42	19	5	18	66	69	−3	43	1990 Lower League
11	AZE	Karabakh Agdam	42	18	7	17	51	72	−21	43	1990 Lower League
12	GEO	Mertskhali Ozurgeti	42	18	6	18	68	61	+7	42	Withdrew; Joined Georgian League
13	GEO	Metallurg Rustavi	42	16	10	16	68	67	+1	42	Withdrew; Joined Georgian League
14	AZE	Hazar Sumgait	42	16	9	17	62	62	0	41	1990 Lower League
15	RUS	Torpedo Volzhskiy	42	16	8	18	63	41	+22	40	1990 Buffer League, Zone Center
16	RUS	Lokomotiv Mineralnyye Vody	42	14	8	20	50	63	−13	36	1990 Lower League
17	RUS	Dinamo Makhachkala	42	11	13	18	56	56	0	35	1990 Lower League
18	AZE	Hazar Lenkoran	42	14	4	24	34	75	−41	32	1990 Lower League
19	RUS	Atommash Volgodonsk	42	12	5	25	56	84	−28	29	1990 Lower League
20	GEO	Shevardeni Tbilisi	42	11	6	25	49	79	−30	28	Withdrew; Joined Georgian League
21	AZE	MCOP-Termist Baku	42	7	5	30	31	95	−64	19	Withdrew
22	GEO	MCOP Tbilisi	42	4	1	37	41	139	−98	9	Withdrew

== Zone Finals ==
The Zone Finals lasted from October 26 to November 13.

=== Group 1 ===
Pos	Rep	Team	Pld	W	D	L	GF	GA	GD	Pts	Promotion
1	RUS	Lokomotiv Gorkiy	4	2	1	1	6	3	+3	5	Promoted
2	RUS	Irtysh Omsk	4	2	0	2	4	3	+1	4	
3	RUS	Cement Novorossiysk	4	1	1	2	4	8	−4	3	

=== Group 2 ===
Pos	Rep	Team	Pld	W	D	L	GF	GA	GD	Pts	Promotion
1	MDA	Textilshchik Tiraspol	4	3	1	0	7	2	+5	7	Promoted
2	UKR	Volyn Lutsk	4	0	3	1	2	5	−3	3	
3	RUS	Krylya Sovetov Kuibyshev	4	0	2	2	4	6	−2	2	

=== Group 3 ===
Pos	Rep	Team	Pld	W	D	L	GF	GA	GD	Pts	Promotion
1	GEO	Dinamo Sukhumi	4	3	0	1	5	1	+4	6	Promoted
2	UZB	Neftyanik Fergana	4	2	0	2	2	5	−3	4	
3	KAZ	Traktor Pavlodar	4	1	0	3	3	4	−1	2	

Source: rsssf.com

== RSFSR Championship ==
The competition consisted of a single group which included the best Russian Federation based from each group (six groups). The competition took place in Maykop in October before the Zone Finals.

Pos	Team	Pld	W	D	L	GF	GA	GD	Pts	Promotion
1	Dinamo Bryansk	5	4	1	0	17	1	+16	9	Champion of the RSFSR
2	Cement Novorossiysk	5	4	1	0	16	2	+14	9	
3	Tekstilschik Kamyshin	5	3	0	2	9	6	+3	6	
4	Krylia Sovetov Kuibyshev	5	2	0	3	6	17	−11	4	
5	Lokomotiv Gorkiy	5	1	0	4	5	12	−7	2	
6	Irtysh Omsk	5	0	0	5	0	15	−15	0	

Source: footballfacts.ru
