= 1995–96 Vyshcha Liha =

5th season of top-tier football league in Vyshcha Liha

Vyshcha Liha
- Season: 1995–96
- Champions: Dynamo Kyiv; 4th title
- Relegated: Volyn Lutsk; Zorya Luhansk; SK Mykolaiv
- Champions League: Dynamo Kyiv
- Cup Winners' Cup: Nyva Vinnytsia
- UEFA Cup: Chornomorets Odesa
- Intertoto Cup: Shakhtar Donetsk
- Top goalscorer: (20) Timerlan Huseinov (Chornomorets)

The 1995–96 Vyshcha Liha season was the 5th since its establishment. FC Dynamo Kyiv were the defending champions.

== Teams ==
=== Promotions ===
- Zirka-NIBAS Kirovohrad, the champion of the 1994–95 Ukrainian First League – (debut)
- CSKA-Borysfen Kyiv, the runner-up of the 1994–95 Ukrainian First League – (debut)

=== Renamed ===
- Before the start of the season Zorya-MALS Luhansk changed its name to Zorya Luhansk.

=== Location ===
Locations of teams home grounds in Ukrainian Premier League 1995-96
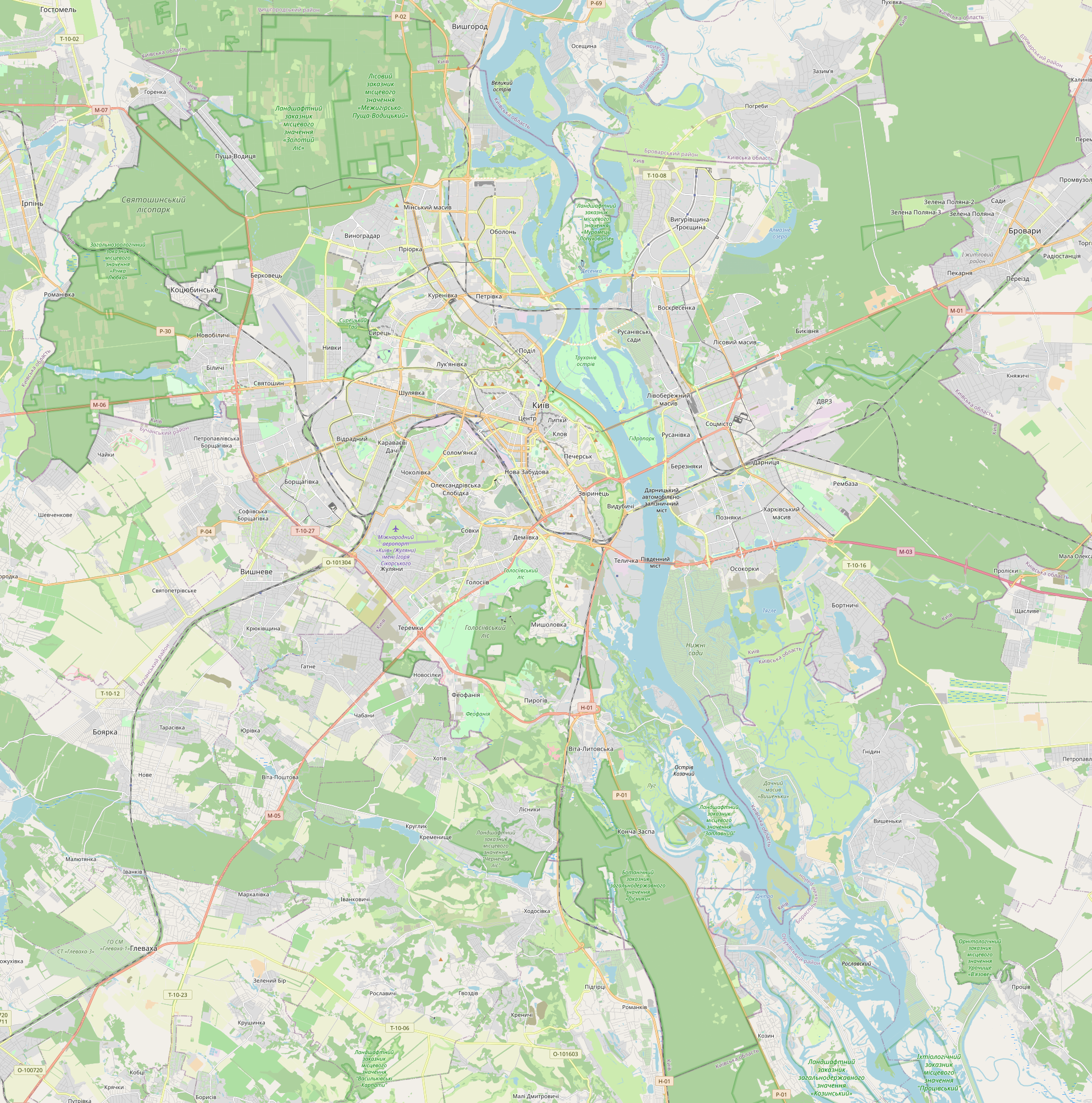
Kyiv city home venues of teams in the League

== Managers ==
| Club | Coach | Replaced Coach | Home stadium |
|---|---|---|---|
| FC Dynamo Kyiv | (Ukraine) Yozhef Sabo | | Republican Stadium; Dynamo Stadium |
| FC Chornomorets Odesa | (Ukraine) Leonid Buriak | | Black Sea Shipping Stadium |
| FC Dnipro Dnipropetrovsk | (Germany) Bernd Stange | | Meteor Stadium |
| FC CSKA-Borysfen Kyiv | (Ukraine) Viktor Chanov | (Ukraine) Mykhailo Fomenko 29 games | CSK ZSU Stadium |
| FC Metalurh Zaporizhzhia | (Ukraine) Oleksandr Tomakh | | Metalurh Stadium |
| FC Zirka-NIBAS Kirovohrad | (Ukraine) Oleksandr Ischenko | | Zirka Stadium |
| FC Torpedo Zaporizhzhia | (Ukraine) Ihor Nadein | | AvtoZAZ Stadium |
| FC Karpaty Lviv | (Ukraine) Volodymyr Zhuravchak | | Ukraina Stadium |
| FC Kremin Kremenchuk | (Ukraine) Valery Yaremchenko | (Ukraine) Tiberiy Korponay 13 games (Ukraine) Anatoliy Skurskyi 4 games | Dnipro Stadium |
| FC Shakhtar Donetsk | (Ukraine) Valeriy Rudakov | (Russia) Vladimir Salkov 6 games | Shakhtar Stadium |
| FC Prykarpattia Ivano-Frankivsk | (Ukraine) Ihor Yurchenko | | Elektron Stadium |
| SC Tavriya Simferopol | (Ukraine) Anatoliy Zayaev | (Ukraine) Yuriy Kerman 17 games | Lokomotyv Stadium |
| FC Nyva Ternopil | (Ukraine) Ihor Yavorskyi | | City Stadium |
| FC Kryvbas Kryvyi Rih | (Ukraine) Myron Markevych | (Ukraine) Yuriy Koval 12 games (Ukraine) Yuriy Hruznov 3 games | Metalurh Stadium |
| FC Nyva Vinnytsia | (Ukraine) Serhiy Morozov | | Central City Stadium |
| SC Mykolaiv | (Ukraine) Yevhen Kucherevskyi | | Central City Stadium |
| FC Volyn Lutsk | (Ukraine) Yuriy Dyachuk-Stavytskyi | (Ukraine) Vitaliy Kvartsyanyi 22 games (Ukraine) Oleksiy Yeschenko 1 game | Avanhard Stadium |
| FC Zorya-MALS | (Ukraine) Viktor Aristov | (Ukraine) Oleksandr Zhuravliov 14 games (Ukraine) Anatoliy Korshykov 3 games | Avanhard Stadium |

=== Changes ===
| Team | Outgoing head coach | Manner of departure | Date of vacancy | Table | Incoming head coach | Date of appointment | Table |
|---|---|---|---|---|---|---|---|
| FC Dynamo Kyiv | (Ukraine) Mykola Pavlov | | | pre-season | (Ukraine) Yozhef Szabo | | pre-season |
| SC Tavriya Simferopol | (Ukraine) Pavlo Kostin | | | pre-season | (Ukraine) Yuriy Kerman | | pre-season |
| CSKA-Borysfen Kyiv | (Ukraine) ? | | | pre-season | (Ukraine) Mykhailo Fomenko | | pre-season |
| FC Karpaty Lviv | (Ukraine) Myron Markevych | | | pre-season | (Ukraine) Volodymyr Zhuravchak | | pre-season |

== League table ==
| Pos | Team | Pld | W | D | L | GF | GA | GD | Pts | Qualification or relegation |
|---|---|---|---|---|---|---|---|---|---|---|
| 1 | Dynamo Kyiv (Note: Participant of the 1996 Ukrainian Cup Final) (C) | 34 | 24 | 7 | 3 | 65 | 17 | +48 | 79 | Qualification to Champions League qualifying round |
| 2 | Chornomorets Odesa | 34 | 22 | 7 | 5 | 56 | 25 | +31 | 73 | Qualification to UEFA Cup second qualifying round |
| 3 | Dnipro Dnipropetrovsk | 34 | 19 | 6 | 9 | 65 | 34 | +31 | 63 | |
| 4 | CSKA-Borysfen Kyiv | 34 | 15 | 11 | 8 | 47 | 27 | +20 | 56 | |
| 5 | Metalurh Zaporizhzhia | 34 | 16 | 4 | 14 | 49 | 42 | +7 | 52 | |
| 6 | Zirka-NIBAS Kirovohrad | 34 | 14 | 8 | 12 | 37 | 33 | +4 | 50 | |
| 7 | Torpedo Zaporizhzhia | 34 | 15 | 3 | 16 | 40 | 46 | −6 | 48 | |
| 8 | Karpaty Lviv | 34 | 12 | 10 | 12 | 39 | 39 | 0 | 46 | |
| 9 | Kremin Kremenchuk | 34 | 14 | 4 | 16 | 46 | 56 | −10 | 46 | |
| 10 | Shakhtar Donetsk | 34 | 13 | 6 | 15 | 44 | 43 | +1 | 45 | Qualification to Intertoto Cup group stage |
| 11 | Prykarpattya Ivano-Frankivsk | 34 | 12 | 8 | 14 | 49 | 49 | 0 | 44 | |
| 12 | Tavriya Simferopol | 34 | 12 | 8 | 14 | 46 | 46 | 0 | 44 | |
| 13 | Nyva Ternopil | 34 | 13 | 3 | 18 | 37 | 42 | −5 | 42 | |
| 14 | Kryvbas Kryvyi Rih | 34 | 11 | 9 | 14 | 43 | 52 | −9 | 42 | |
| 15 | Nyva Vinnytsia | 34 | 11 | 7 | 16 | 28 | 36 | −8 | 40 | Qualification to Cup Winners' Cup qualifying round |
| 16 | SC Mykolaiv (R) | 34 | 10 | 8 | 16 | 37 | 53 | −16 | 38 | Relegated to Ukrainian First League |
| 17 | Volyn Lutsk (R) | 34 | 9 | 7 | 18 | 34 | 58 | −24 | 34 | Relegated to Ukrainian First League |
| 18 | Zorya Luhansk (R) | 34 | 4 | 4 | 26 | 16 | 80 | −64 | 16 | Relegated to Ukrainian First League |

Source: uafootball.net.ua
Rules for classification: 1st points; 2nd goal difference; 3rd goal scored
(C) Champions; (R) Relegated

== Results ==
| Home \ Away | CHO | CSK | DNI | DYN | KAR | KRE | KRY | MZA | MYK | NVT | NYV | PRY | SHA | TAV | TZA | VOL | ZIR | ZOR |
|---|---|---|---|---|---|---|---|---|---|---|---|---|---|---|---|---|---|---|
| Chornomorets Odesa | — | 1–0 | 2–1 | 1–0 | 1–0 | 6–1 | 2–0 | 4–3 | 1–0 | 2–0 | 2–0 | 0–0 | 2–1 | 4–3 | 3–1 | 4–1 | 1–1 | 2–0 |
| CSKA-Borysfen Kyiv | 1–0 | — | 0–0 | 1–2 | 2–1 | 1–1 | 2–0 | 0–2 | 0–0 | 1–1 | 1–0 | 3–0 | 4–0 | 2–0 | 2–0 | 3–1 | 0–1 | 4–0 |
| Dnipro | 0–2 | 2–0 | — | 0–0 | 3–0 | 2–0 | 4–2 | 5–0 | 5–0 | 2–1 | 1–2 | 1–0 | 2–2 | 2–0 | 2–0 | 2–1 | 3–1 | 3–1 |
| Dynamo Kyiv | 3–0 | 0–0 | 5–1 | — | 2–0 | 2–0 | 3–0 | 2–0 | 3–0 | 2–0 | 1–0 | 1–1 | 3–1 | 2–0 | 2–0 | 4–0 | 5–1 | 1–0 |
| Karpaty Lviv | 3–2 | 1–1 | 2–1 | 1–1 | — | 2–0 | 2–2 | 1–0 | 3–0 | 3–0 | 3–0 | 0–0 | 1–0 | 1–1 | 1–2 | 2–1 | 2–0 | 2–1 |
| Kremin Kremenchuk | 0–1 | 1–1 | 0–3 | 0–1 | 6–1 | — | 1–1 | 1–0 | 3–2 | 3–0 | 0–1 | 4–2 | 3–2 | 1–0 | 3–2 | 3–1 | 2–1 | 1–0 |
| Kryvbas Kryvyi Rih | 0–0 | 2–0 | 1–0 | 2–2 | 1–3 | 2–1 | — | 2–1 | 1–1 | 1–0 | 1–1 | 2–1 | 1–0 | 2–0 | 2–3 | 5–1 | 5–4 | 2–0 |
| Metalurh Zaporizhzhia | 0–0 | 0–1 | 2–1 | 0–2 | 1–1 | 1–0 | 2–1 | — | 3–2 | 1–0 | 3–0 | 2–1 | 2–0 | 3–0 | 2–0 | 2–0 | 1–1 | 5–0 |
| SC Mykolaiv | 1–2 | 0–2 | 0–2 | 0–2 | 0–0 | 2–0 | 2–1 | 1–0 | — | 2–0 | 2–0 | 3–0 | 0–0 | 1–2 | 2–1 | 0–3 | 0–0 | 4–1 |
| Nyva Ternopil | 0–1 | 1–0 | 0–1 | 1–0 | 1–0 | 0–0 | 3–1 | 2–1 | 4–1 | — | 2–0 | 3–1 | 1–3 | 1–0 | 2–0 | 1–2 | 0–0 | 3–1 |
| Nyva Vinnytsia | 0–0 | 1–1 | 2–0 | 0–2 | 0–0 | 0–2 | 1–1 | 0–1 | 2–1 | 3–2 | — | 1–0 | 0–0 | 1–3 | 2–0 | 2–0 | 0–1 | 5–0 |
| Prykarpattya Ivano-Frankivsk | 1–1 | 3–2 | 1–1 | 2–3 | 1–0 | 5–2 | 1–0 | 4–1 | 2–2 | 3–1 | 2–1 | — | 2–0 | 4–3 | 4–0 | 3–0 | 0–0 | 4–0 |
| Shakhtar Donetsk | 2–0 | 2–3 | 1–0 | 2–3 | 2–0 | 4–1 | 4–0 | 1–2 | 0–1 | 2–4 | 1–2 | 1–0 | — | 0–0 | 2–1 | 1–1 | 1–0 | 3–0 |
| Tavriya Simferopol | 0–0 | 2–2 | 3–3 | 0–2 | 2–0 | 1–2 | 1–1 | 1–1 | 5–2 | 0–2 | 1–0 | 3–0 | 1–3 | — | 2–0 | +:- | 0–0 | 3–0 |
| Torpedo Zaporizhzhia | 2–1 | 0–1 | 1–3 | 1–1 | 1–1 | 3–1 | 3–1 | 1–0 | 2–1 | 1–0 | 1–0 | 2–0 | 3–0 | 2–3 | — | 1–1 | 1–0 | 3–0 |
| Volyn Lutsk | 0–3 | 1–1 | 1–5 | 0–2 | 1–0 | 2–0 | 0–0 | 2–1 | 3–3 | 3–1 | 0–0 | 2–0 | 0–0 | 0–3 | 0–1 | — | 1–0 | 3–1 |
| Zirka-NIBAS Kirovohrad | 0–2 | 0–0 | 1–1 | 2–1 | 2–1 | 3–0 | 2–0 | 4–1 | 0–1 | 1–0 | 1–0 | 3–0 | 0–1 | 2–1 | 1–0 | 1–0 | — | 2–0 |
| Zorya Luhansk | 0–3 | 1–5 | 0–3 | 0–0 | 1–1 | 1–3 | 1–0 | 1–5 | 0–0 | +:- | 0–1 | 1–1 | 0–2 | 0–2 | 0–1 | 3–2 | 2–1 | — |

Source: uafootball.net.ua
Legend: Blue = home team win; Yellow = draw; Red = away team win.

== Top goalscorers ==
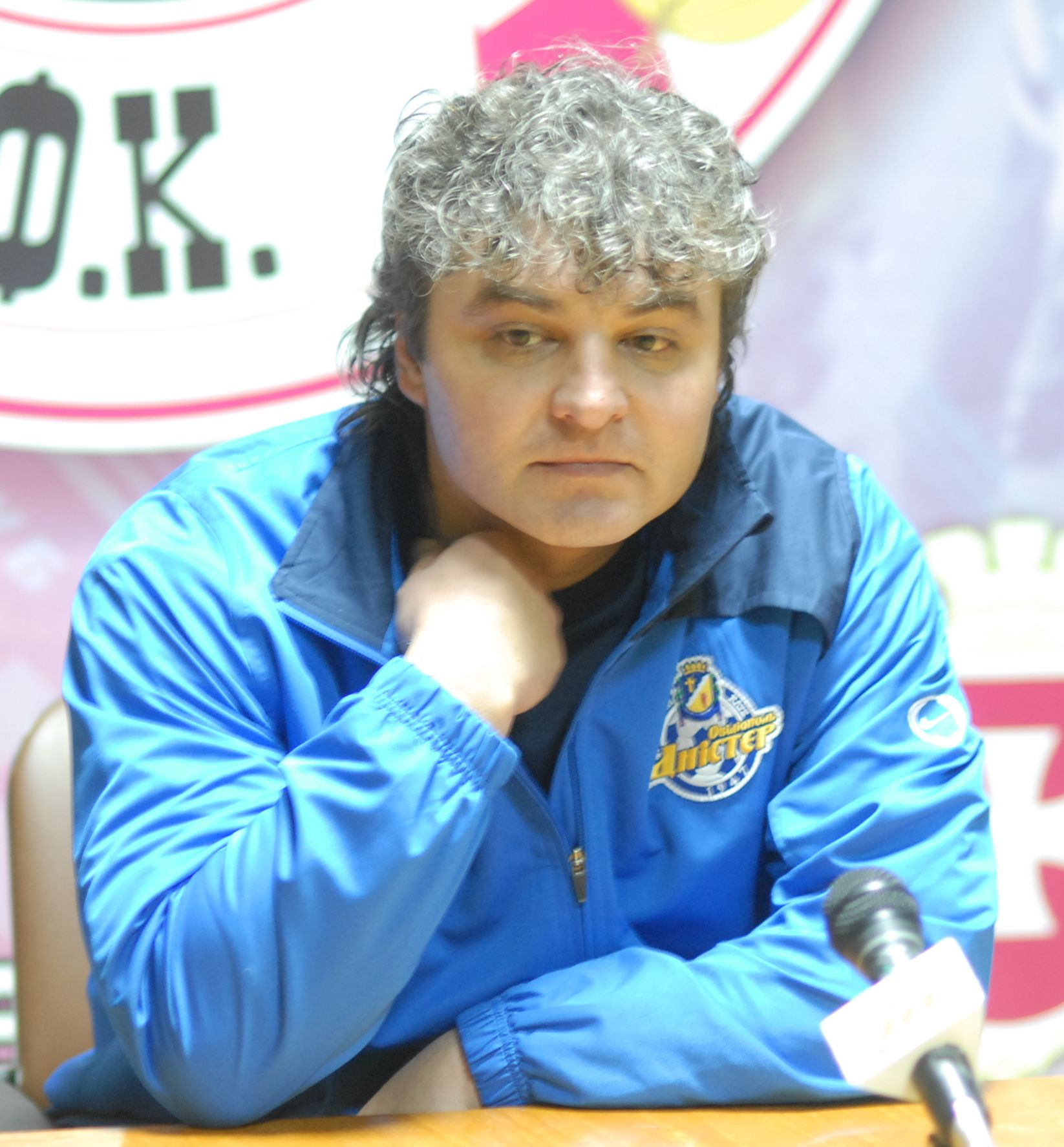
Timerlan Huseinov

| Rank | Player | Club | Goals (Pen.) |
|---|---|---|---|
| 1 | (Ukraine) Timerlan Huseinov | Chornomorets Odesa | 20 (1) |
| 2 | (Ukraine) Andriy Shevchenko | Dynamo Kyiv | 16 (2) |
| 3 | (Ukraine) Oleksandr Palyanytsia | Dnipro Dnipropetrovsk | 13 |
| 3 | (Ukraine) Andriy Pokladok | Karpaty Lviv | 13 (1) |
| 3 | (Ukraine) Oleh Matviiv | Shakhtar / Kremin | 13 (5) |
| 6 | (Ukraine) Volodymyr Mozolyuk | Volyn Lutsk | 12 (3) |
| 7 | (Ukraine) Volodymyr Sharan | Dnipro Dnipropetrovsk | 11 |
| 7 | (Ukraine) Ivan Korponay | Kremin Kremenchuk | 11 (1) |
| 9 | (Ukraine) Serhiy Borysenko | Zirka-NIBAS Kirovohrad | 10 |
| 9 | (Georgia (country)) Mikhail Potskhveria | Metalurh / Shakhtar | 10 |
| 9 | (Ukraine) Oleh Yaschuk | Nyva Ternopil | 10 |
| 9 | (Ukraine) Roman Hryhorchuk | Kryvbas Kryvyi Rih | 10 (6) |
| 9 | (Ukraine) Yuriy Vernydub | Torpedo Zaporizhzhia | 10 (8) |
