= Andriy Fedetskyi =

Ukrainian footballer (1958–2018)

Personal information
- Full name: Andriy Stefanovych Fedetskyi
- Date of birth: 5 August 1958
- Place of birth: Hamaliivka, Lviv Oblast, Ukrainian SSR
- Date of death: 23 August 2018 (aged 60)
- Place of death: Lavriv, Volyn Oblast, Ukraine
- Height: 1.68 m (5 ft 6 in)
- Positions: Defender; midfielder

Youth career
- 1974–1976: SKA Lviv
- 1976–1977: LUFK

Senior career*
Years	Team	Apps	(Gls)
1977	Torpedo Lutsk	14	(0)
1980–1982	Torpedo Lutsk	91	(24)
1983–1984	Metalist Kharkiv	11	(3)
1984–1990	Volyn Lutsk	283	(51)
1990–1991	Gwardia Chełm		
1991–1996	Volyn Lutsk	138	(14)

Managerial career
- 1995–1996: Volyn Lutsk (assistant)
- 2000–2001: Volyn Lutsk (assistant)
- * Club domestic league appearances and goals

Andriy Fedetskyi (Ukrainian: Андрій Стефанович Федецький; 5 August 1958 – 23 August 2018) was a Ukrainian professional footballer who played as defender and midfielder and manager.

== Career ==
Fedetskyi was a product of the two youth sportive schools in Lviv, but made his professional career mainly in the Volyn Lutsk and become it the best goalscorer (alongside with a teammate Volodymyr Dykyi) with 91 goals.

After his retirement Fedetskyi twice was an assistant coach to Volyn Lutsk.

== Personal life ==
His son Artem Fedetskyi is also a former professional football player.

== Death ==
Fedetskyi died on 23 August 2018 at the age of 60.

== Honours ==
Metalist Kharkiv

- Soviet Cup finalist: 1983

Individual

- Master of Sport of the USSR: 1983
