= Stolyar =

Stolyar (Ukrainian: Столяр) is a Russian and Ukrainian language occupational surname literally meaning "carpenter, cabinetmaker, joiner". Notable people with the surname include:

- Roman Stolyar (born 1967), Russian composer, piano improviser and educator
- Vasyl Stolyar (born 1962), Ukrainian businessman
