= 1989 Soviet Second League, Zone 6 =

Football Championship of Ukrainian SSR
- Season: 1989
- Champions: Volyn Lutsk
- Promoted: none (lost playoffs)
- Relegated: Novator Mariupol
- Top goalscorer: 35 - Ihor Yavorsky (Nyva Ternopil)

1989 Football Championship of Ukrainian SSR was the 59th season of association football competition of the Ukrainian SSR, which was part of the Soviet Second League. The Soviet Second League was split after the season and all national (republican) competitions were placed at the lower league (4th division), while the upper league (3rd division) was transformed into a buffer league.

The 1989 Football Championship of Ukrainian SSR was won for the first time by FC Volyn Lutsk. In the competition Volyn passed the 1988 Football Champion of Ukrainian SSR, FC Bukovyna Chernivtsi. Like the last season Bukovyna, Volyn also failed to earn promotion to the First League as it lost the inter-zonal playoffs.

== Teams ==
=== Map ===
Locations of teams in Lower Second League, Zone 1

=== Promoted teams ===
- Kremin Kremenchuk – Champion of the Fitness clubs competitions (KFK) (returning to professional level after an absence of 20 seasons)
  - Note: Unlike the previous team Dnipro Kremenchuk that represented the local factory Kredmash, the new team represented the Soviet factory of KrAZ and conditionally is considered as a successor of Dnipro.

=== Relegated teams ===
- Zorya Voroshylovhrad – (Returning after 2 seasons)
- Kolos Nikopol – (Returning after 10 seasons)

=== Moved outside of the Zone ===
- FC Desna Chernihiv was placed in the Zone 5
- FC Karpaty Lviv was revived and without participating in amateur competitions placed in the Zone 5

=== Renamed teams ===
- Prior to the start of the season Torpedo Lutsk was renamed to Volyn Lutsk.
- Prior to the start of the season Spartak Zhytomyr was renamed to Polissya Zhytomyr.
- Prior to the start of the season Novator Zhdanov was renamed to Novator Mariupol.

== League standings ==
Pos	Team	Pld	W	D	L	GF	GA	GD	Pts	Qualification or relegation
1	Volyn Lutsk (C)	52	32	14	6	84	38	+46	78	Qualified for promotional playoffs 1990 Buffer League, Zone West
2	Bukovyna Chernivtsi	52	29	18	5	71	26	+45	76	1990 Buffer League, Zone West
3	Nyva Ternopil	52	29	12	11	78	45	+33	70	1990 Buffer League, Zone West
4	Zorya Voroshylovhrad	52	27	14	11	94	59	+35	68	1990 Buffer League, Zone West
5	Nyva Vinnytsia	52	25	15	12	75	40	+35	65	1990 Buffer League, Zone West
6	Kremin Kremenchuk	52	21	18	13	59	50	+9	60	1990 Buffer League, Zone West
7	SKA Odesa	52	17	25	10	58	44	+14	59	1990 Buffer League, Zone West
8	Vorskla Poltava	52	24	10	18	62	55	+7	58	1990 Buffer League, Zone West
9	Zakarpattia Uzhhorod	52	25	7	20	59	64	−5	57	1990 Buffer League, Zone West
10	Kryvbas Kryvyi Rih	52	23	10	19	77	69	+8	56	1990 Lower League, Zone 1
11	Podillya Khmelnytskyi	52	24	7	21	64	57	+7	55	1990 Lower League, Zone 1
12	Kolos Nikopol	52	21	12	19	67	55	+12	54	1990 Lower League, Zone 1
13	Torpedo Zaporizhia	52	19	12	21	51	62	−11	50	1990 Lower League, Zone 1
14	Zirka Kirovohrad	52	16	17	19	44	52	−8	49	1990 Lower League, Zone 1
15	Polissya Zhytomyr	52	16	16	20	59	62	−3	48	1990 Lower League, Zone 1
16	Naftovyk Okhtyrka	52	16	16	20	56	60	−4	48	1990 Lower League, Zone 1
17	Dnipro Cherkasy	52	15	16	21	64	79	−15	46	1990 Lower League, Zone 1
18	Sudnobudivnyk Mykolaiv	52	15	16	21	61	66	−5	46	1990 Lower League, Zone 1
19	Avanhard Rivne	52	14	17	21	39	41	−2	45	1990 Lower League, Zone 1
20	Mayak Kharkiv	52	17	10	25	32	57	−25	44	1990 Lower League, Zone 1
21	Prykarpattia Ivano-Frankivsk	52	16	12	24	51	68	−17	44	1990 Lower League, Zone 1
22	Chaika Sevastopol	52	15	14	23	57	79	−22	44	1990 Lower League, Zone 1
23	Dynamo Bila Tserkva	52	15	13	24	56	72	−16	43	1990 Lower League, Zone 1
24	Okean Kerch	52	15	9	28	50	70	−20	39	1990 Lower League, Zone 1
25	Krystal Kherson	52	13	10	29	63	84	−21	36	1990 Lower League, Zone 1
26	Shakhtar Pavlohrad	52	13	7	32	57	105	−48	33	1990 Lower League, Zone 1
27	Novator Mariupol (R)	52	12	9	31	51	80	−29	33	Relegation to the Fitness clubs competitions (KFK)

(C) Champions; (R) Relegated

=== Top goalscorers ===
The following were the top ten goalscorers.

#	Scorer	Goals (Pen.)	Team
1	Ihor Yavorsky	35	Nyva Ternopil
2	Viktor Karachun	28	Zorya Voroshylovhrad
3	Volodymyr Dykyi	22	Volyn Lutsk
3	Eduard Valenko	22	Krystal Kherson
5	Oleksandr Malyshenko	21	Zorya Voroshylovhrad
5	Oleksandr Usatyi	21	Kryvbas Kryvyi Rih
5	Ivan Shariy	21	Vorskla Poltava
5	Volodymyr Shyshkov	21	Polissya Zhytomyr

== See also ==
- Soviet Second League
