= Artem Fedetskyi =

Ukrainian footballer

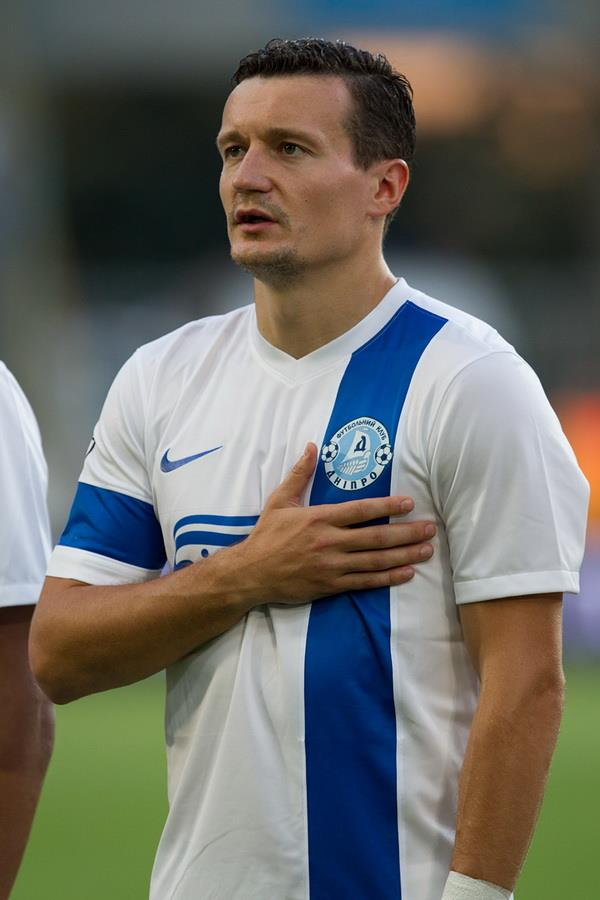
- Fedetskyi in 2015

Personal information
- Full name: Artem Andriyovych Fedetskyi
- Date of birth: 26 April 1985 (age 41)
- Place of birth: Novovolynsk, Ukrainian SSR, Soviet Union
- Height: 1.84 m (6 ft 0 in)
- Position: Right-back

Youth career
- –1998: Volyn Lutsk
- 2001–2003: Shakhtar Donetsk

Senior career*
Years	Team	Apps	(Gls)
2002–2012	Shakhtar Donetsk	5	(1)
2002–2006	→ Shakhtar-3 Donetsk	31	(3)
2003–2006	→ Shakhtar-2 Donetsk	56	(6)
2007	→ Arsenal Kyiv (loan)	12	(0)
2007–2008	→ Kharkiv (loan)	24	(5)
2009–2012	→ Karpaty Lviv (loan)	75	(12)
2012–2016	Dnipro Dnipropetrovsk	69	(3)
2016–2017	Darmstadt 98	16	(0)
2017–2019	Karpaty Lviv	39	(20)

International career
2010–2016	Ukraine	53	(2)
- * Club domestic league appearances and goals

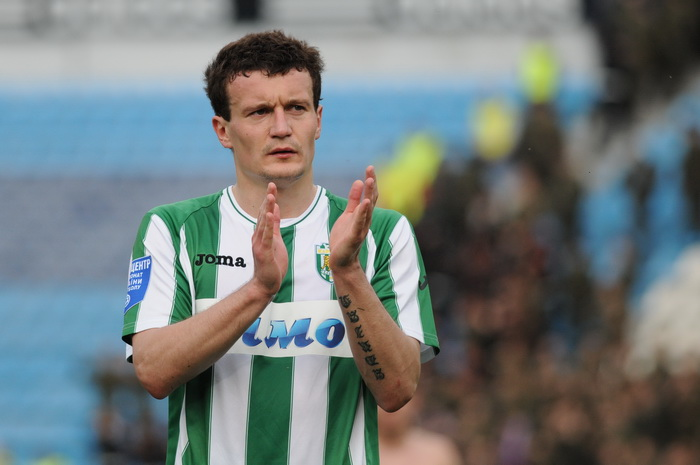
In 2012 on loan in Karpaty

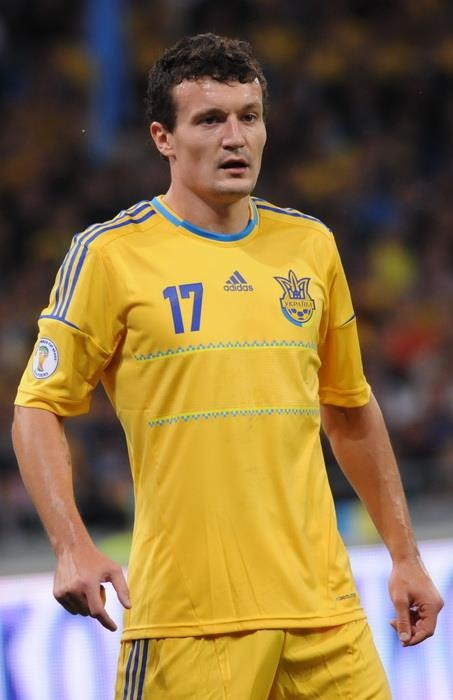
During the 2013 match Ukraine – England

Artem Andriyovych Fedetskyi (Ukrainian: Артем Андрійович Федецький; born 26 April 1985) is a Ukrainian former professional footballer who played as a right-back.

== Early life ==
Fedetskyi was born in a mining city of Novovolynsk, near the border with Poland, in a footballer family.

He finished his 10th grade of high school in Lutsk, and to graduate he was forced to end his final year in Donetsk due to his transfer to the Shakhtar football academy. Later Fedetskyi graduated from the Lutsk Institute of Human Development with a degree in marketing. In 2018 he defended his dissertation at Volyn University on the subject "Methods of training football students using information models" and received the academic degree of Candidate of Pedagogical Sciences.

== Football career ==
Fedetskyi was a pupil of the Volyn Lutsk sports school. When he was 8, his father signed him up for football section in the local sports school. His first coach was Andriy Fedetskyi. In the Ukrainian Youth Football League he played for Shakhtar Donetsk. Also, early in his career Fedetskyi played for the amateur club ENKO Lutsk in the local Volyn Regional Football League.

Fedetskyi started his professional football career in Donetsk for Shakhtar. His first professional match took place on 15 September 2002 when Shakhtar-3 was hosting Stal-2 Alchevsk at Shakhtar Stadium in Makiivka. Fedetskyi came out on substitution at the end of the match, by which time Shakhtar was already ahead of Stal. He replaced Dmytro Kononchenko at the 87th minute.

Fedetskyi remained with Shakhtar until 2006 without playing a single match for the first squad and staying with reserves where for a short while he was wearing the captain's band. In 2007 he was loaned to Arsenal Kyiv. With Arsenal Fedetskyi made his debut in the Ukrainian Premier League on 4 March 2007 when Arsenal was visiting Chornomorets Odesa. He played the full match, but the Kyivans lost 0:2. After the spring half, for the 2007–08 season he moved to play for FC Kharkiv. Before going on loan to Kharkiv, the new owner Vadim Rabinovich wanted to buy off Fedetskyi contract, but Shakhtar was agreeing only on loan. To Kharkiv, Fedetskyi went with Oleh Karamushka. While playing for Kharkiv, Fedetskyi scored a hat-trick on 6 April 2008 in an away match against Naftovyk Okhtyrka which Kharkiv won 4:1. It so happened that during that match Fedetskyi was placed by Volodymyr Bezsonov closer to attack while experimenting with good position for him.

In the 2008–09 season, he played for FC Shakhtar Donetsk, returning to Shakhtar from in the 2008 summer transfer season. He barely played any games with 5 matches in UPL, 3 matches in Ukrainian Cup (early stages), and a single match in UEFA Champions League. He also scored once in a home match against Tavriya Simferopol as part of league competitions. Fedetskyi, nonetheless, was still honored as a member of the Shakhtar's winning squad in UEFA Cup and given a state award.

For the three seasons Fedetskyi was loaned out to Karpaty Lviv where he received a regular playtime. The offer came from Oleg Kononov. As a Karpaty player, he also finally made a debut for the Ukraine national football team. In 2010 he also scored his first goals at the continental club's competitions, UEFA Europa League, on 22 July 2010 in home match against KR Reykjavík.

In 2012 Fedetskyi was transferred out to FC Dnipro where he spent another 4 seasons. In 2015 with Dnipro he reached the 2015 UEFA Europa League final where the club lost to Sevilla FC. Following the 2015–16 Ukrainian Premier League Dnipro was barred from European competitions for refusing to pay on its contracts due to situation with the club's owner (Ihor Kolomoyskyi) and the Russo-Ukrainian War in general.

In 2016 Fedetskyi signed with the German club Darmstadt 98 that recently returned to Bundesliga (after 33 year break) and was struggling to stay at the top tier. With only 7 wins, Darmstadt placed dead last in the 2016–17 Bundesliga and Fedetskyi played in less than half of the matches for the club's senior squad. After the season, he returned to Ukraine signing with Karpaty.

Being 32 years of age, Fedetskyi signed a two-year contract with Karpaty and stayed with them for the next couple of seasons before retiring from professional football. Starting from February 2018 and until 2019 he served as the team's captain of senior squad on a regular basis. In 2019 he almost did not play recording only one match in the UPL and the two-leg relegation play-off. In 2019 one of Muscovite clubs offered him a contract with a salary of €2 million per year, but Fedetskyi declined. One of Russian sports reporters Vasily Utkin commented that Fedetskyi was lying about his €2 million contract offer.

For the 2020–21 season Fedetskyi signed with amateur club Votrans Lutsk.

In August 2023, it was announced that Fedetskyi would play for FC Kovel in Ukrainian Amateur Cup. FC Kovel was eliminated by FC Trostianets in the first round by a significant margin, and Fedetskyi was not on the club's team roster for both matches of the two-leg play-off.

== Political career ==
Fedetskyi ran in the July 2019 Ukrainian parliamentary election in electoral district 118, Lviv Oblast. As a non-partisan candidate he was running from the party Servant of the People. The seat was won by Halyna Vasylchenko.

== Filmography ==
As extras along with Artem Milevskyi, Fedetskyi appeared in the 2023 Ukrainian film "Dovbush" by Oles Sanin.

== Personal life ==
His father Andriy Fedetskyi was also a football player.

Fedetskyi is married and has a son, Adrian (2009).

Artem Fedetskyi acknowledged that the one who helped him to adapt in Shakhtar was Anatoliy Tymoshchuk. In 2021 in interview to some Ukrainian internet media, Fedetskyi expressed his thought that Tymoshchuk is being overcriticized in Ukraine as well as the Russian Federation.

== Career statistics ==
Scores and results list Ukraine's goal tally first.

No	Date	Venue	Opponent	Score	Result	Competition
1.	7 June 2013	Podgorica City Stadium, Podgorica, Montenegro	Montenegro	3–0	4–0	2014 FIFA World Cup qualification
2.	6 September 2013	Arena Lviv, Lviv, Ukraine	San Marino	8–0	9–0	2014 FIFA World Cup qualification

== Honours ==
After playing a home match on Sunday, 17 August 2008, against rivals Metalist Kharkiv which Shaktar tied 2:2, Fedetskiy was named by UA-Football as the best right midfielder of the fifth round in the Ukrainian Premier League. He also scored one goal against Galatasaray SK and after that goal Karpaty reached UEFA Europe League Group Stage.

FC Shakhtar Donetsk

- UEFA Cup (1): 2009
- Ukrainian Premier League (1): runner-up 2008–09

FC Dnipro Dnipropetrovsk

- UEFA Europa League (1): runner-up 2015
- Ukrainian Premier League (1): runner-up 2013–14
