= Volodymyr Dykyi =

Soviet and Ukrainian footballer (1962–2021)

Personal information
- Full name: Volodymyr Petrovych Dykyi
- Date of birth: 15 February 1962
- Place of birth: Chervonohrad, Ukrainian SSR, Soviet Union
- Date of death: 28 July 2021 (aged 59)
- Place of death: Lutsk, Ukraine
- Height: 1.70 m (5 ft 7 in)
- Position: Forward

Senior career*
Years	Team	Apps	(Gls)
1979–1981	Karpaty Lviv	88	(10)
1982	Metalist Kharkiv	6	(2)
1983–1985	SKA Karpaty Lviv	74	(10)
1985	FC Nyva Ternopil	19	(1)
1986	Naftovyk Okhtyrka	9	(0)
1988–1996	FC Volyn Lutsk	284	(84)
1996–1997	FC Veres Rivne	36	(1)

International career
1979–1980	Soviet Union U-18	7	(1)

Managerial career
- 2000–2011: Volyn Lutsk (assistant)
- 2012–2013: Volyn Lutsk (youth school)
- 2013–2014: Volyn Lutsk U-19
- 2014–2021: Volyn Lutsk (assistant)
- * Club domestic league appearances and goals

Volodymyr Petrovych Dykyi (15 February 1962 – 28 July 2021) was a Soviet and Ukrainian professional football player and coach.

== Career ==
Native of mining city of Chervonohrad, Lviv Oblast, Volodymyr Dykyi is the all-time goalscoring leader of FC Volyn Lutsk.

His professional career Dykyi started out in FC Karpaty Lviv in 1979. It was the season when Karpaty led by Ishtvan Sekech won the Soviet First League and were promoted to premiers. Around that time Dykyi was invited to the Soviet Union youth team and participated in the 1979 Friendship Games (international annual multi-sport games among socialist countries) – 5 games, 1 goal as well as the 1980 UEFA Youth (U-18) tournament (Soviet Union was eliminated by Yugoslavia) – 2 games.

After the Lviv team was merged with local army team, in 1982 Dykyi moved to Kharkiv where he spent a season before returning back to the united SKA-Karpaty, with which stayed until 1985.

In mid 1980s Dykyi hoped couple of teams before ending up in FC Volyn Lutsk, with which he stayed until 1996 and playing almost 300 matches at professional level.

== Career statistics ==
=== Club ===
Appearances and goals by club, season and competition
Club	Season	League			Cup		Europe		Other		Total	
Club	Season	Division	Apps	Goals	Apps	Goals	Apps	Goals	Apps	Goals	Apps	Goals
Karpaty Lviv	1979	Soviet First League	20	1	–		–		–		20	1
Karpaty Lviv	1980	Soviet Top League	27	0	1	0	–		–		28	0
Karpaty Lviv	1981	Soviet First League	41	9	4	0	–		–		45	9
Karpaty Lviv	Total		88	10	5	0	0	0	0	0	93	10
Metalist Kharkiv	1982	Soviet Top League	6	2	2	0	–		–		8	2
SKA-Karpaty Lviv	1983	Soviet First League	33	4	1	0	–		–		34	4
SKA-Karpaty Lviv	1984	Soviet First League	36	6	2	0	–		–		38	6
SKA-Karpaty Lviv	1985	Soviet First League	5	0	–		–		–		5	0
SKA-Karpaty Lviv	Total		74	10	3	0	0	0	0	0	77	10
Nyva Ternopil	1985	Soviet Second League	19	1	–		–		–		19	1
Naftovyk Okhtyrka	1986	Soviet Second League	9	0	–		–		–		9	0
Volyn Lutsk	1988	Soviet Second League	48	16	–		–		–		48	16
Volyn Lutsk	1989	Soviet Second League	45	22	–		–		–		45	22
Volyn Lutsk	1990	Soviet Second League	33	13	–		–		–		33	13
Volyn Lutsk	1991	Soviet Second League	36	13	–		–		–		36	13
Volyn Lutsk	1992	Ukrainian Top League	15	2	1	1	–		–		16	3
Volyn Lutsk	1992–93	Ukrainian Top League	27	9	5	2	–		–		32	11
Volyn Lutsk	1993–94	Ukrainian Top League	23	3	6	1	–		–		29	4
Volyn Lutsk	1994–95	Ukrainian Top League	28	4	2	1	–		–		30	5
Volyn Lutsk	1995–96	Ukrainian Top League	26	4	1	0	–		–		27	4
Volyn Lutsk	Total		281	86	15	5	0	0	0	0	296	91
Veres Rivne	1996–97	Ukrainian First League	36	1	2	0	–		–		38	1
Career Total			513	110	27	5	0	0	0	0	540	115
