= 1990 Soviet Second League, Zone West =

Second League
- Season: 1990
- Champions: Bukovina Chernovtsy
- Promoted: Bukovina Chernovtsy, Daugava Riga
- Relegated: 5 teams

1990 Soviet Second League, Zone West was part of the season of association football competition of the Soviet Second League. The Zone West of the Second League was established as part of reorganization of the whole Second League when it was split into upper Second League (with three zones) and lower Second League (with ten zones). The competition was won by Bukovina Chernovtsy.

The games in the group started on April 7, 1990 with 8 match ups and finished on November 8, 1990 with final 11 matches.

== Teams ==
The Second League was restructured reducing number of zones from 9 to 3.

=== Admitted teams ===
- 1989 Zone 6 - top nine teams (Volyn Lutsk, Bukovina Chernovtsy, Niva Ternopol, Zaria Lugansk, Niva Vinnitsa, Kremen Kremenchug, SKA Odessa, Vorskla Poltava, Zakarpatie Uzhgorod)
- 1989 Zone 5 - six teams (Karpaty Lvov, Baltika Kaliningrad, Dinamo Brest, Dnepr Mogilev, Khimir Grodno, Zaria Beltsy)
- 1989 Zone 3 - three teams (Lori Kirovokan, Spartak Nalchik, Shirak Leninakan)
- 1989 Zone 2 - a team (Start Ulyanovsk)
- 1989 Zone 1 - a team (Iskra Smolensk)

=== Promoted teams ===
None

=== Relegated teams ===
- FC Daugava Riga, 1944
- FC Galichina Drogobich

=== Renamed teams ===
- Prior to the start of the season SKA-Karpaty Lvov was renamed to Galichina and moved to city of Drogobich (Drohobych).

== Final standings ==
Pos	Team	Pld	W	D	L	GF	GA	GD	Pts	Promotion or relegation
1	Bukovina Chernovtsy (C, P)	42	23	12	7	69	27	+42	58	Promoted
2	Daugava Riga (P)	42	22	12	8	67	37	+30	56	Promoted
3	Karpaty Lvov	42	23	9	10	61	36	+25	55	
4	Niva Ternopol	42	22	11	9	70	51	+19	55	
5	Niva Vinnitsa	42	17	16	9	56	29	+27	50	
6	SKA Odessa	42	21	7	14	59	32	+27	49	
7	Zaria Lugansk (Note: The city of Voroshylovgrad was renamed into Lugansk (Luhansk).)	42	20	9	13	72	44	+28	49	
8	Spartak Nalchik	42	20	7	15	55	46	+9	47	
9	Dinamo Brest	42	15	15	12	49	39	+10	45	
10	Kremen Kremenchug	42	16	11	15	49	45	+4	43	
11	Zaria Beltsy	42	15	12	15	52	52	0	42	
12	Vorskla Poltava	42	15	11	16	47	51	−4	41	
13	Dnepr Mogilev	42	17	6	19	58	54	+4	40	
14	Galichina Drogobich	42	12	15	15	52	50	+2	39	
15	Khimik Grodno	42	16	6	20	46	52	−6	38	
16	Start Ulyanovsk	42	12	13	17	34	45	−11	37	transferred to Zone Center
17	Volyn Lutsk	42	14	7	21	42	61	−19	35	
18	Lori Kirovokan	42	15	4	23	42	79	−37	34	transferred to Zone Center
19	Iskra Smolensk (R)	42	11	10	21	46	66	−20	32	Relegated
20	Zakarpatie Uzhgorod (R)	42	12	7	23	42	70	−28	31	Relegated
21	Baltika Kaliningrad (R)	42	7	13	22	32	64	−32	27	Relegated
22	Shirak Leninakan (R)	42	9	3	30	33	104	−71	21	Relegated

(C) Champions; (P) Promoted; (R) Relegated

=== Representation by Republic ===
- Ukrainian SSR: 11
- Russian SFSR 4
- Byelorussian SSR: 3
- Armenian SSR 2
- Latvian SSR: 1
- Moldavian SSR 1

== Top goalscorers ==
The following were the top ten goalscorers.

#	Scorer	Goals (Pen.)	Team
