= Mykhaylo Burch =

Ukrainian footballer (born 1960)

Personal information
- Full name: Mykhaylo Vasylyovych Burch
- Date of birth: 15 April 1960 (age 66)
- Place of birth: Kokshetau, Kazakh SSR
- Height: 1.80 m (5 ft 11 in)
- Position: Goalkeeper

Senior career*
| Years | Team | Apps | (Gls) |
| 1977–1979 | FC Torpedo Lutsk | 83 | (0) |
| 1980 | FC Spartak Ivano-Frankivsk | 7 | (0) |
| 1981–1982 | FC Torpedo Lutsk | 88 | (0) |
| 1983 | SKA Karpaty Lviv | 0 | (0) |
| 1984–1990 | FC Volyn Lutsk | 220 | (12) |
| 1990–1991 | Petrochemia Płock | ? | (0) |
| 1991–1993 | FC Volyn Lutsk | 27 | (5) |
| 1993 | Petrochemia Płock | ? | (0) |
| 1993–1994 | Hutnik Warsaw | 5 | (0) |
| 1994 | ŠK Chemlon Humenné | 1 | (0) |
| 1994–1995 | FC Veres Rivne | 17 | (0) |
| 1995–1999 | FC Volyn Lutsk | 30 | (1) |
| 2000 | FC Veres Rivne | 14 | (4) |
| 2000–2001 | FC Sokil Zolochiv | 27 | (3) |
| 2001 | FC LUKOR Kalush | 9 | (0) |
- * Club domestic league appearances and goals

Mykhaylo Vasylyovych Burch (Ukrainian: Михайло Васильович Бурч; born 15 April 1960) is a former Ukrainian football player. Besides Ukraine, he played in Poland and Slovakia.

== See also ==
- List of goalscoring goalkeepers
