= Volodymyr Hashchyn =

Personal information
- Full name: Volodymyr Volodymyrovych Hashchyn
- Date of birth: 2 January 1972 (age 54)
- Place of birth: Novovolynsk, Ukrainian SSR
- Position: Midfielder

Youth career
- Kiev sports boarding school

Senior career*
Years	Team	Apps	(Gls)
1988–1989	FC Volyn Lutsk	30	(3)
1991	SKA Kiev	25	(1)
1992–1993	FC Volyn Lutsk	25	(8)
1993–1996	KSZO Ostrowiec Świętokrzyski		
1996–1997	FC Volyn Lutsk	37	(5)
1997–1998	FC Dnipro Dnipropetrovsk	10	(0)
1997	→ FC Metalurh Novomoskovsk (loan)	1	(2)
1997–1998	→ FC Nyva Vinnytsia (loan)	18	(8)
1999	FC Kryvbas Kryvyi Rih	24	(11)
1999	FC Zirka Kirovohrad	11	(2)
1999	→ FC Zirka-2 Kirovohrad (loan)	3	(3)
2000	FC Polihraftekhnika Oleksandriya	22	(1)
2001–2007	FC Volyn Lutsk	145	(23)
2001–2002	→ FC Kovel-Volyn-2 Kovel (loan)	1	(0)
2003–2004	→ FC Ikva Mlyniv (loan)	2	(0)
2007	FC ODEK Orzhiv		

Managerial career
- 2013–2015: Volyn Lutsk (academy staff)
- 2015–: Marado Lutsk
- * Club domestic league appearances and goals

Volodymyr Volodymyrovych Hashchyn (born 2 January 1972) is a retired Soviet and Ukrainian professional footballer.
