= Yuriy Kerman =

Soviet and Ukrainian footballer and coach

Personal information
- Full name: Yuriy Serhiyovych Kerman
- Date of birth: 2 August 1955 (age 71)
- Place of birth: Soviet Union
- Position: Midfielder

Senior career*
| Years | Team | Apps | (Gls) |
| 1975–1977 | Lokomotiv Kaluga | | |
| 1978 | Dynamo Stavropol | 36 | (9) |
| 1979–1985 | SC Novator | 295 | (61) |
| 1986 | Tavriya Simferopol | 19 | (1) |
| 1987–1988 | SC Novator | 65 | (4) |
| 1992–1994 | Azovets Mariupol | 16 | (0) |

Managerial career
- 1989–1994: Novator Mariupol
- 1995: SC Tavriya Simferopol (assistant)
- 1996: SC Tavriya Simferopol
- 2000–2007: FC Illichivets-2 Mariupol
- 2007: FC Illichivets Mariupol
- 2007–2012: FC Illichivets-2 Mariupol
- * Club domestic league appearances and goals

Yuriy Serhiyovych Kerman (Ukrainian: Юрій Сергійович Керман; born on 2 August 1955) is a Soviet and Ukrainian professional footballer and coach.
