= Vitaliy Kvartsyanyi =

Ukrainian football manager (born 1953)

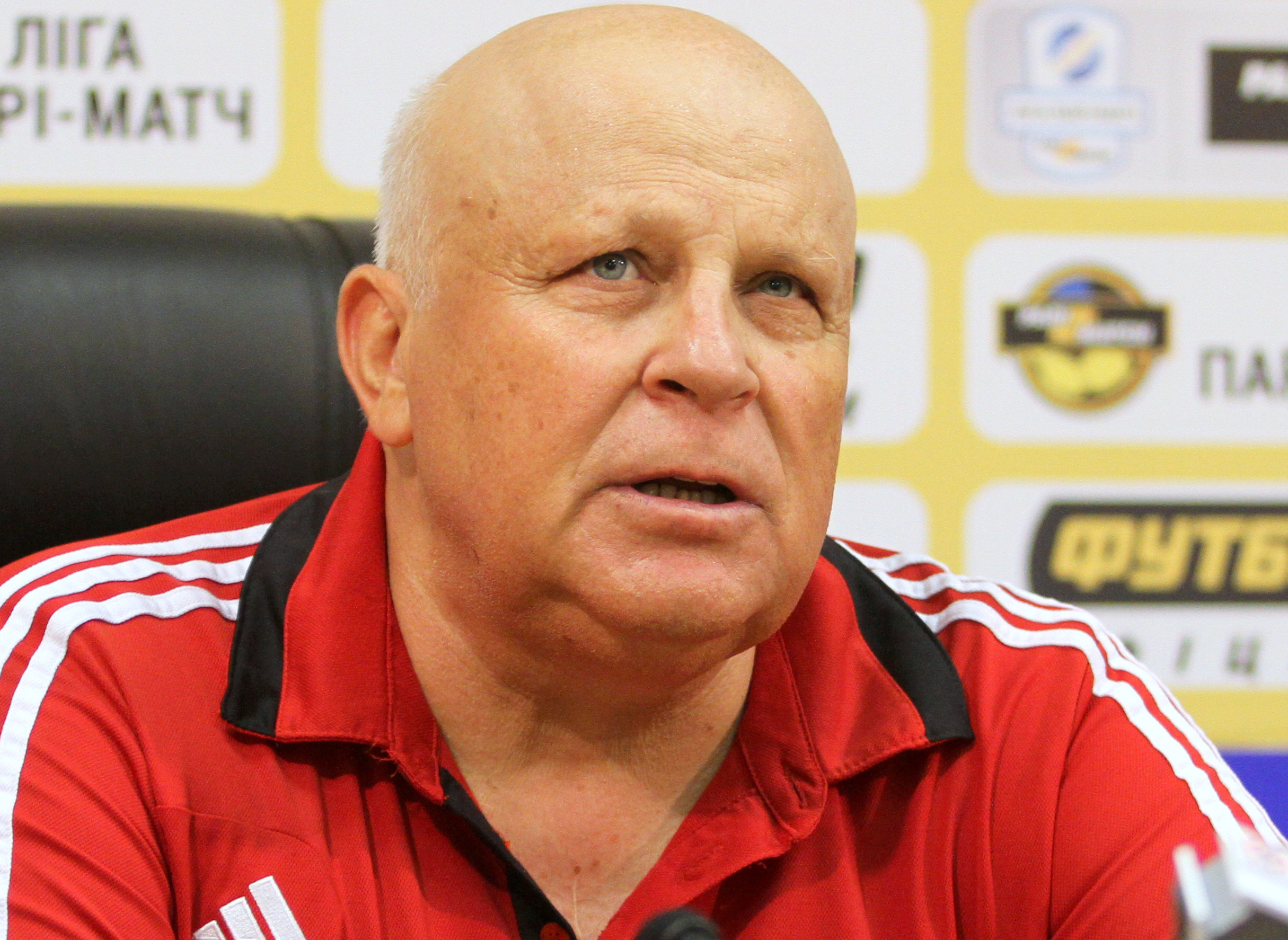

Personal information
- Full name: Vitaliy Volodymyrovych Kvartsyanyi
- Date of birth: 19 July 1953 (age 73)
- Place of birth: Lutsk, Soviet Union (now Ukraine)
- Position: Midfielder

Team information
- Current team: Tavria-Skif Rozdol (amateurs manager)

Senior career*
Years	Team	Apps	(Gls)
1969–1971	Torpedo Lutsk	0	(0)
1974–1976	Elektryk Lutsk		
1977–1978	Torpedo Lutsk	4	(0)
1978–1984	Prylad Lutsk		

Managerial career
- 1978–1984: Prylad Lutsk
- 1984–1988: Torpedo Lutsk (assistant)
- 1988–1990: Volyn Lutsk
- 1990–1994: KSZO Ostrowiec Świętokrzyski
- 1994: Volyn Lutsk (assistant)
- 1994–1996: Volyn Lutsk
- 1997: Podillya Khmelnytskyi
- 1999–2000: Pidshypnyk Lutsk
- 2000: Podillya Khmelnytskyi
- 2001–2011: Volyn Lutsk
- 2012: Kryvbas Kryvyi Rih
- 2012: Metalurh Zaporizhzhia
- 2013: Volyn Lutsk (interim)
- 2013–2017: Volyn Lutsk
- 2013–2017: Volyn Lutsk (president)
- 2018–: Tavria-Skif Rozdol (amateurs)
- * Club domestic league appearances and goals

Vitaliy Volodymyrovych Kvartsyanyi (Ukrainian: Віталій Володимирович Кварцяний, born 19 July 1953) is a Ukrainian football manager and former player. Throughout his career he was mainly associated with Volyn Lutsk.

Preceded by Vasyl Stolyar	Football Federation of Volyn; 2013–present	Succeeded by incumbent
