= Vasyl Stolyar =

Ukrainian businessman

Vasyl Stolyar Василь Столяр
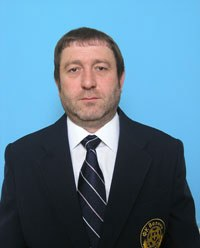
- Born: April 11, 1962 (age 63); Lutsk, Ukrainian SSR
- Occupations: Chairman, FC Volyn Lutsk
- Children: 3

Vasyl Stolyar (Ukrainian: Василь Столяр) (born April 11, 1962) is a Ukrainian businessman and politician. he served as a member of the Volyn Oblast council from 2006 to 2020. He was also previously chairman of FC Volyn Lutsk from 2003 to 2013, when he was replaced by Vitaliy Kvartsyanyi.

== Early life ==
Stolyar was born on 11 April 1962 in the city of Lutsk, which was then part of the Ukrainian SSR in the Soviet Union. After attending Secondary School No. 5 in Lutsk, he completed his compulsory military service in the Soviet Armed Forces in 1982. Afterwords, he studied at Donetsk National University of Economics and Trade named after M. Tugan-Baranovsky within the Faculty of Technology, graduating in 1988. He later graduated from Lesya Ukrainka Volyn National University within the Faculty of Law.

== Business activities and FC Volyn Lutsk ==
In March 2000, Vasyl Stolyar founded the Junior Football School "Femida-Inter" (Lutsk), presently Junior Football School "Volyn". Since January 2001 – FC Volyn Lutsk vice-president. Holds the position of FC Volyn Lutsk president since 2003.

As of 2025, Stolyar remains the co-owner of more than 10 companies, including plastic manufacturing firm SK-Budplast and berry cultivation company Flora-Pivnich. He was also formerly director of the municipal enterprise "Volynpryrodresurs" from 2017 to 2020.

== Political activities ==
Stolyar is a member of the Volyn Oblast council (the parliament of Volyn Oblast) since 2006; during the 2006 Ukrainian local elections he was elected on the list of Our Ukraine and during the 2010 Ukrainian local elections he was elected for Front of Changes. As a member of Front of Changes. On 15 June 2013 his Front for Change (party) merged into "Fatherland". He was re-elected again in 2015 from Batkivshchyna, but was not re-elected during the 2020 elections when he ran as a Servant of the People candidate.

== Family ==
Stolyar is divorced and has three sons.

== Legal issues ==
Stolyar has been the subject of a local investigation for his long-running land-lease dispute with the village of Pidhaitsi in Lutsk. In 2025, it was reported by the village council that he had accumulated more than ₴900,000 in unpaid rent on several land parcels he has originally leased in 2005 for fish farming, despite continuing to use the plots after ending his registration as the proprietor in 2014. The council subsequently sought legal action to recover the debt and terminate the lease, with the courts ruling that the case could proceed.

Preceded by Ihor Bezuhlyi	Football Federation of Volyn; 2009–2013	Succeeded by Vitaliy Kvartsianyi
