= Volodymyr Mozolyuk =

Ukrainian footballer

Volodymyr Mozolyuk Володимир Мозолюк
Personal information
- Full name: Volodymyr Danylovych Mozolyuk
- Date of birth: 28 January 1964 (age 62)
- Place of birth: Lutsk, Ukrainian SSR
- Height: 1.82 m (5 ft 11 1/2 in)
- Position: Striker

Youth career
- Volyn Lutsk academy

Senior career*
Years	Team	Apps	(Gls)
1981–1985	FC Torpedo Lutsk	151	(24)
1985	Dnipro	1	(0)
1986–1988	FC Kolos Nikopol	74	(10)
1989–1994	Volyn Lutsk	184	(33)
1994–1995	Karpaty Lviv	7	(0)
1995	RKS Motor Lublin	4	(0)
1995–1996	Volyn Lutsk	33	(12)
1996–1997	Maccabi Kafr Kanna	10	(1)
1997–2000	Volyn Lutsk	111	(16)

Managerial career
- Volyn Lutsk (academy staff)
- * Club domestic league appearances and goals

Volodymyr Danylovych Mozolyuk (Ukrainian: Володимир Данилович Мозолюк; born 28 January 1964 in Lutsk) is a Ukrainian retired professional footballer who used to play as a forward.
