= 1990 Soviet Second League =

Second League
- Season: 1990
- Champions: Bukovyna Chernivtsi, Uralmash Sverdlovsk, Neftyanik Fergana
- Promoted: 6 teams
- Relegated: 12 teams

The Second League was restructured reducing number of zones from 9 to 3 due to withdrawals by clubs from Estonia, Georgia, Latvia (except Pardaugava Riga, a majority-Russian club) and Lithuania as they declared independence from the Soviet Union.

== Representatives ==
Distribution by Zone
| Republic | West | Center | East | Total |
|---|---|---|---|---|
| Russian | 4 | 20 | 5 | 29 |
| Armenian | 2 | —N/a | | 2 |
| Azerbaijan | —N/a | 2 | —N/a | 2 |
| Byelorussian | 3 | —N/a | | 3 |
| Kazakh | —N/a | | 7 | 7 |
| Kyrgyz | —N/a | | 1 | 1 |
| Latvian | 1 | —N/a | | 1 |
| Moldavian | 1 | —N/a | | 1 |
| Tajik | —N/a | | 1 | 1 |
| Turkmen | —N/a | | 1 | 1 |
| Ukrainian | 11 | —N/a | | 11 |
| Uzbek | —N/a | | 7 | 7 |

== Final standings ==
=== West ===
| Pos | Rep | Team | Pld | W | D | L | GF | GA | GD | Pts | Promotion or relegation |
|---|---|---|---|---|---|---|---|---|---|---|---|
| 1 | (Ukrainian Soviet Socialist Republic) | Bukovyna Chernivtsi | 50 | 29 | 17 | 4 | 87 | 34 | +53 | 75 | Promoted to First Liga |
| 2 | (Latvia) | Daugava Riga | 50 | 31 | 9 | 10 | 86 | 43 | +43 | 71 | Promoted to First Liga |
| 3 | (Ukrainian Soviet Socialist Republic) | Karpaty Lviv | 50 | 28 | 13 | 9 | 86 | 45 | +41 | 69 | |
| 4 | (Ukrainian Soviet Socialist Republic) | Nyva Ternopil | 50 | 28 | 13 | 9 | 67 | 38 | +29 | 69 | |
| 5 | (Ukrainian Soviet Socialist Republic) | Nyva Vinnytsia | 50 | 24 | 14 | 12 | 67 | 42 | +25 | 62 | |
| 6 | (Ukrainian Soviet Socialist Republic) | SKA Odesa | 50 | 23 | 15 | 12 | 82 | 60 | +22 | 61 | |
| 7 | (Ukrainian Soviet Socialist Republic) | Zorya Luhansk | 50 | 25 | 9 | 16 | 69 | 50 | +19 | 59 | |
| 8 | (Russian Soviet Federative Socialist Republic) | Spartak Nalchik | 50 | 20 | 14 | 16 | 51 | 40 | +11 | 54 | |
| 9 | (Byelorussian Soviet Socialist Republic) | Dinamo Brest | 50 | 19 | 15 | 16 | 64 | 53 | +11 | 53 | |
| 10 | (Ukrainian Soviet Socialist Republic) | Kremin Kremenchuk | 50 | 22 | 7 | 21 | 64 | 66 | −2 | 51 | |
| 11 | (Moldavian Soviet Socialist Republic) | Zaria Bălţi | 50 | 19 | 13 | 18 | 75 | 64 | +11 | 51 | |
| 12 | (Ukrainian Soviet Socialist Republic) | Vorskla Poltava | 50 | 19 | 12 | 19 | 84 | 66 | +18 | 50 | |
| 13 | (Byelorussian Soviet Socialist Republic) | Dnepr Mogilev | 50 | 20 | 9 | 21 | 59 | 59 | 0 | 49 | |
| 14 | (Ukrainian Soviet Socialist Republic) | Halychyna Drohobych | 50 | 18 | 13 | 19 | 54 | 55 | −1 | 49 | |
| 15 | (Byelorussian Soviet Socialist Republic) | Khimik Grodno | 50 | 20 | 8 | 22 | 59 | 64 | −5 | 48 | |
| 16 | (Russian Soviet Federative Socialist Republic) | Start Ulyanovsk | 50 | 15 | 15 | 20 | 48 | 55 | −7 | 45 | |
| 17 | (Ukrainian Soviet Socialist Republic) | Volyn Lutsk | 50 | 15 | 15 | 20 | 58 | 73 | −15 | 45 | |
| 18 | (Armenian Soviet Socialist Republic) | Lori Kirovokan | 50 | 17 | 10 | 23 | 47 | 59 | −12 | 44 | |
| 19 | (Russian Soviet Federative Socialist Republic) | Iskra Smolensk | 50 | 15 | 13 | 22 | 52 | 70 | −18 | 43 | Relegated |
| 20 | (Ukrainian Soviet Socialist Republic) | Zakarpattia Uzhhorod | 50 | 17 | 8 | 25 | 56 | 75 | −19 | 42 | Relegated |
| 21 | (Russian Soviet Federative Socialist Republic) | Baltika Kaliningrad | 50 | 11 | 20 | 19 | 48 | 60 | −12 | 42 | Relegated |
| 22 | (Armenian Soviet Socialist Republic) | Shirak Leninakan | 50 | 13 | 15 | 22 | 58 | 77 | −19 | 41 | Relegated |

=== Center ===
| Pos | Rep | Team | Pld | W | D | L | GF | GA | GD | Pts | Promotion or relegation |
|---|---|---|---|---|---|---|---|---|---|---|---|
| 1 | (Russian Soviet Federative Socialist Republic) | Uralmash Sverdlovsk | 42 | 23 | 13 | 6 | 62 | 21 | +41 | 59 | Promoted to First Liga |
| 2 | (Russian Soviet Federative Socialist Republic) | Tekstilshchik Kamyshin | 42 | 22 | 8 | 12 | 73 | 49 | +24 | 52 | Promoted to First Liga |
| 3 | (Russian Soviet Federative Socialist Republic) | Krylia Sovetov Samara | 42 | 19 | 11 | 12 | 53 | 35 | +18 | 49 | |
| 4 | (Russian Soviet Federative Socialist Republic) | Metallurg Lipetsk | 42 | 18 | 13 | 11 | 56 | 43 | +13 | 49 | |
| 5 | (Azerbaijan Soviet Socialist Republic) | Kyapaz Gyanja | 42 | 21 | 5 | 16 | 66 | 65 | +1 | 47 | |
| 6 | (Russian Soviet Federative Socialist Republic) | Tsement Novorossiysk | 42 | 19 | 9 | 14 | 65 | 54 | +11 | 47 | |
| 7 | (Russian Soviet Federative Socialist Republic) | Druzhba Maykop | 42 | 19 | 7 | 16 | 56 | 56 | 0 | 45 | |
| 8 | (Russian Soviet Federative Socialist Republic) | Torpedo Ryazan | 42 | 15 | 15 | 12 | 41 | 44 | −3 | 45 | |
| 9 | (Russian Soviet Federative Socialist Republic) | Dynamo Bryansk | 42 | 18 | 8 | 16 | 59 | 53 | +6 | 44 | |
| 10 | (Russian Soviet Federative Socialist Republic) | Zvezda Perm | 42 | 15 | 14 | 13 | 68 | 45 | +23 | 44 | |
| 11 | (Azerbaijan Soviet Socialist Republic) | Goyazan Gazakh | 42 | 19 | 4 | 19 | 56 | 56 | 0 | 42 | |
| 12 | (Russian Soviet Federative Socialist Republic) | Torpedo Vladimir | 50 | 19 | 12 | 19 | 84 | 66 | +18 | 50 | |
| 13 | (Russian Soviet Federative Socialist Republic) | Terek Grozny | 50 | 20 | 9 | 21 | 59 | 59 | 0 | 49 | |
| 14 | (Russian Soviet Federative Socialist Republic) | Gastello Ufa | 50 | 18 | 13 | 19 | 54 | 55 | −1 | 49 | |
| 15 | (Russian Soviet Federative Socialist Republic) | Zenit Izhevsk | 50 | 20 | 8 | 22 | 59 | 64 | −5 | 48 | |
| 16 | (Russian Soviet Federative Socialist Republic) | Nart Cherkessk | 50 | 15 | 15 | 20 | 48 | 55 | −7 | 45 | |
| 17 | (Russian Soviet Federative Socialist Republic) | Torpedo Volzhskiy | 50 | 15 | 15 | 20 | 58 | 73 | −15 | 45 | |
| 18 | (Russian Soviet Federative Socialist Republic) | Sokol Saratov | 50 | 17 | 10 | 23 | 47 | 59 | −12 | 44 | |
| 19 | (Russian Soviet Federative Socialist Republic) | Mashuk Pyatigorsk | 50 | 15 | 13 | 22 | 52 | 70 | −18 | 43 | Relegated |
| 20 | (Russian Soviet Federative Socialist Republic) | SKA Rostov-na-Donu | 50 | 17 | 8 | 25 | 56 | 75 | −19 | 42 | Relegated |
| 21 | (Russian Soviet Federative Socialist Republic) | Zarya Kaluga | 50 | 11 | 20 | 19 | 48 | 60 | −12 | 42 | Relegated |
| 22 | (Russian Soviet Federative Socialist Republic) | Volgar Astrakhan | 50 | 13 | 15 | 22 | 58 | 77 | −19 | 41 | Relegated |

=== East ===
| Pos | Rep | Team | Pld | W | D | L | GF | GA | GD | Pts | Promotion or relegation |
|---|---|---|---|---|---|---|---|---|---|---|---|
| 1 | (Uzbek Soviet Socialist Republic) | Neftyanik Fergana | 42 | 23 | 13 | 6 | 62 | 21 | +41 | 59 | Promoted to First Liga |
| 2 | (Uzbek Soviet Socialist Republic) | Novbakhor Namangan | 42 | 22 | 8 | 12 | 73 | 49 | +24 | 52 | Promoted to First Liga |
| 3 | (Russian Soviet Federative Socialist Republic) | Okean Nakhodka | 42 | 19 | 11 | 12 | 53 | 35 | +18 | 49 | |
| 4 | (Russian Soviet Federative Socialist Republic) | Amur Blagoveshchensk | 42 | 18 | 13 | 11 | 56 | 43 | +13 | 49 | |
| 5 | (Kazakh Soviet Socialist Republic) | Meliorator Chimkent | 42 | 21 | 5 | 16 | 66 | 65 | +1 | 47 | |
| 6 | (Kazakh Soviet Socialist Republic) | Khimik Jambul | 42 | 19 | 9 | 14 | 65 | 54 | +11 | 47 | |
| 7 | (Uzbek Soviet Socialist Republic) | Avtomobilist Kokand | 42 | 19 | 7 | 16 | 56 | 56 | 0 | 45 | |
| 8 | (Turkmen Soviet Socialist Republic) | Kopet-Dag Ashkhabad | 42 | 15 | 15 | 12 | 41 | 44 | −3 | 45 | |
| 9 | (Kirghiz Soviet Socialist Republic) | Alga Frunze | 42 | 18 | 8 | 16 | 59 | 53 | +6 | 44 | |
| 10 | (Kazakh Soviet Socialist Republic) | Traktor Pavlodar | 42 | 15 | 14 | 13 | 68 | 45 | +23 | 44 | |
| 11 | (Russian Soviet Federative Socialist Republic) | Zvezda Irkutsk | 42 | 19 | 4 | 19 | 56 | 56 | 0 | 42 | |
| 12 | (Uzbek Soviet Socialist Republic) | Sogdiana Jizak | 50 | 19 | 12 | 19 | 84 | 66 | +18 | 50 | |
| 13 | (Russian Soviet Federative Socialist Republic) | Dinamo Barnaul | 50 | 20 | 9 | 21 | 59 | 59 | 0 | 49 | |
| 14 | (Kazakh Soviet Socialist Republic) | Shakhter Karaganda | 50 | 18 | 13 | 19 | 54 | 55 | −1 | 49 | |
| 15 | (Tajik Soviet Socialist Republic) | Vakhsh Kurgan-Tyube | 50 | 20 | 8 | 22 | 59 | 64 | −5 | 48 | |
| 16 | (Kazakh Soviet Socialist Republic) | Tselinnik Tselinograd | 50 | 15 | 15 | 20 | 48 | 55 | −7 | 45 | |
| 17 | (Kazakh Soviet Socialist Republic) | Ekibastuzets Ekibastuz | 50 | 15 | 15 | 20 | 58 | 73 | −15 | 45 | |
| 18 | (Uzbek Soviet Socialist Republic) | Surkhan Termez | 50 | 17 | 10 | 23 | 47 | 59 | −12 | 44 | |
| 19 | (Kazakh Soviet Socialist Republic) | Kaysar Kzil-Orda | 50 | 15 | 13 | 22 | 52 | 70 | −18 | 43 | Relegated |
| 20 | (Russian Soviet Federative Socialist Republic) | Irtysh Omsk | 50 | 17 | 8 | 25 | 56 | 75 | −19 | 42 | Relegated |
| 21 | (Uzbek Soviet Socialist Republic) | Zarafshan Navoi | 50 | 11 | 20 | 19 | 48 | 60 | −12 | 42 | Relegated |
| 22 | (Uzbek Soviet Socialist Republic) | Spartak Andizhan | 50 | 13 | 15 | 22 | 58 | 77 | −19 | 41 | Relegated |
