= FC Volyn Lutsk =

Ukrainian association football club

- Full name: FC Volyn Lutsk
- Nickname: The Crusaders
- Founded: 1960; 66 years ago
- Dissolved: 2022
- Ground: "Avanhard" Stadium, Lutsk
- Capacity: 12,080
- 2021–22: Ukrainian First League, 10th of 16 (withdrew)
- Website: fcvolyn.net.
Home colours	Away colours

FC Volyn Lutsk (Ukrainian: ФК «Волинь» Луцьк [woˈlɪnʲ ˈlutsʲk]) was a Ukrainian football club based in Lutsk.

On 21 June 2023 the 31st PFL Conference excluded several clubs that did not compete in the 2022–23 season and did not renew their membership.

Their home stadium is Avanhard Stadium.

Colours are (Home) light red shirt, deep red shorts; (Away) white shirt with light red collar and upper sleeve, white shorts.

== History ==
Traceable evidence of football in Volyn Oblast takes its roots from the Polish Wołyń District League that was liquidated during the World War II in 1939. The best city's team Policejski Klub Sportowy (PKS) Lutsk competed along with other clubs of the region with many clubs of the today's neighboring Rivne Oblast. Before establishing of FC Volyn, the best clubs of the region were Dynamo Lutsk (1940-1956) and army club GDO (Garrison Officers' Club, 1957-1959). Both clubs competed at Republican competitions that until 1959 were considered to be amateur.

=== Soviet period ===
In the beginning of 1960 in connection with expanding of the second tier (2nd) of the Soviet football (Soviet Class B) to Lutsk city was granted a place among "teams of masters". Since the strongest team of the city and region GDO Lutsk was part of the Armed Forces society, it was decided to create absolutely new team under auspices of the regional organization of the Volunteer Sports Society "Avanhard". Its actual name the team received on April 3, 1960 when it was time to apply for the competitions. According to one of the players of that time Mykhailo Kuzmin, at the gathering of players and the team's staff it was debated for long time what name the team will have. Among variations there were "Dynamo" (as the leading regional team in 1946–1956) or more patriotic "Styr" until one of the players did not say "Volyn"... After a brief pause, everyone caused a noise and unanimously determined that it is what needed to be.

Its opening match Volyn played in Kirovohrad (today Kropyvnytskyi) on 10 April 1960. It was when the team earned its first victory with the score 3–1 with the first goal scored by Volodymyr Boichenko. He was the first player who made a hat-trick in that match. Its debuting match at the Avanhard Stadium in Lutsk took place on 2 May 1960 with Sudobudivnyk Mykolaiv. That match ended in goalless draw. Its first home victory Volyn gained on 7 May 1960 over Avanhard Chernivtsi 2–1. The first goal at home was scored by Viktor Pyasetskyi. Its first season Volyn finished 13th among 17 teams, while throughout the season being among the best 10 teams with misfortunes at the final rounds moved the team to the bottom of the table. The next two seasons for Volyn were disastrous, twice in the row the team was placing dead last. In 1963 there were some reforms in the Soviet football and Class B was downgraded to third tier. It was the season when the Volyn's crisis was ending and it rose to 17th place out of 20 teams. But during the relegation play-off matches of that season against the regional champion, the Lutsk team lost to the Volodymyr team "Zenit" 1–0 and 3–3. Nonetheless, it was "Volyn" that the regional leadership decided to keep in class "B".

In the following, the team's results improved, but its weakness was instability. A great start to the 1964 season was marred by continuous failures in the second half. The Volhynians demonstrated a rather bright game in 1966, when they were among the leading five for 30 rounds. But again - a series of defeats and goalless draws pushed the team down to 12th place, although it was mere 4 points away from the same fifth place. In the following seasons, the team performed with disruptions, jumping from twelfth to nineteenth place in the table.

In 1968, the club was placed under the care of a new "sponsor" - Mashzavod (later - Lutsk Automobile Plant, LuAZ) and renamed Torpedo. The last season in class "B" was the best for the team. At the winter pre-season preparations in Transcarpathia, "Torpedo" won the "Podsnezhnik" Cup of the Ukrainian SSR Football Federation, which was quite prestigious at the time. And in the 1970 championship, the team confidently held zonal competitions and finished in second place. There was not enough strength for the final and the Lutsk team fell to the 8th place in the table. The 1970 season was the last season for Class B competition which for that season was considered to be at the fourth tier.

In 1971, Class "B" was disbanded, and its best teams were included in the newly created Soviet Second League. Lutsk "Torpedo" was among them. However, the first season in the Second League was unsuccessful - the second-to-last 25th place. But behind us was our most principled opponent - "Horyn" Rivne. According to the regulations, both teams were supposed to leave the Second League, but the Football Federation of the Ukrainian SSR, taking into account the loss of master teams in two adjacent regions of Western Ukraine, decided to leave the teams of both cities in the Second League. However, in 1972, on the basis of the team out of the city of Lutsk, a team of masters of the Carpathian Military District was formed and SC Lutsk was established based on SKA Lviv.

In 1977 the club was revived as Torpedo and re-entered the Soviet third division and until 1980 remained at the bottom of the league's table. Although, for example, in 1979, "Torpedo" had quite a good first half, constantly being in the top ten. But a single victory in 23 matches of the second half pushed the Torpedo team to the bottom again. Another surge took place in 1981, when head coach Vyacheslav Pershin by attracting talented youth and experienced veterans to the team managed to create a true fighting collective. From 20th place in 1980, "Torpedo" rose to 8th place. The highlight of the season were two victories over "Kolos" Poltava - 5–0 each in Lutsk and Poltava.

In the following seasons, "Torpedo" moved into the category of strong middling teams and constantly finished in the middle of the tournament table. The team was equipped with a backbone of experienced players, the seasonal rotation of the team decreased, etc. In 1986, managed by Myron Markevych, "Torpedo" confidently finished the tournament calendar and was among the contenders for "bronze". Its fate was decided in the match of the last round between SKA Kyiv and "Torpedo" - both teams had an equal number of points. Unfortunately, the Lutsk team conceded 2–0 and finished fifth, because "Nyva" Ternopil also passed Lutsk. In the same year, "Torpedo" received the "Mark of Quality" (Znak Yakosti) prize for teams of the Second League, which was awarded to the team that trained the most players for the teams of the First and Top leagues and gathered the most spectators. Taking into account the fact that during the season only Oleh Fedyukov, Oleh Benko and Vasyl Storchak joined the Top League from the Lutsk team, winning this prize became natural. The 1987 season was marked by the team reaching the 1/16 finals of the Soviet Cup, where the Torpedo team lost to CSKA Moscow 1–0 and 0–0. Unsuccessful performances in the championship led to the resignation of Myron Markevich, and in his place came another coach of the team - Vitaliy Kvartsyanyi, who raised the team from 16th to 8th place.

Taking into account the political and economic changes in the life of the country, on January 30, 1989, at a meeting of public organizations of the city, a self-supporting (khozrasschyot) football club was created, which was given back its initial name - "Volyn". In the same season, from the very first rounds, the players of Lutsk entered the fight for the highest awards and, having confidently passed the intense competition of 52 matches (32 wins with 6 losses), won the title of champions of Ukraine. The club's record was set by striker Volodymyr Dykyi, who scored 22 goals during the season. Unfortunately, again Volyn came short to win the promotional tournament for entry into the First League. The Football Federation of the Soviet Union also jammed a pole into wheels by forbidding re-signing of players for promotional matches, and canceling this decision before the very start of them, warning only Volyn's competitors about it. A large number of injured players led to the fact that even goalkeeper Mykhailo Burch had to be released on the field as a field player. Therefore, the Volhynians could not compete on an equal footing with their rivals and settled for second place.

The gold medals of the 1989 Champions of Ukraine were awarded to: goalkeepers - Raimonds Laizāns, Mykhailo Burch; defenders - Volodymyr Antonyuk, Oleh Fedyukov, Ivan Polnyi, Hennadiy Shukhman, Roman Kryshchyshyn; midfielders - Anatoliy Radenko, Mykola Sluka, Andriy Fedetskyi, Serhiy Kovalyov, Volodymyr Hashchyn, Volodymyr Martyniuk; attackers - Armands Zeiberliņš, Volodymyr Dykyi, Pavlo Filonyuk, Volodymyr Mozolyuk. The head of the team - Anatoliy Barabasevych, head coach - Vitaliy Kvartsyanyi, coach - Oleksiy Yeshchenko.

=== Ukrainian period ===
After the championship season, there was a certain decline, however, Volyn finished the 1991 season in 8th place in the Western Buffer Group of the Second League. This made it possible to enter the first national championship of Ukraine as a team of Vyshcha Liha. The first season turned out to be successful for Volyn - 5th place in the group. Although during the season the team was among the leaders for some time. However, in the summer, the head coach of "Volyn" Myron Markevych left the team without warning and went to Lviv, taking with him two key players - Plotko and Topchiyev. The financial and organizational problems that began at that time in most Ukrainian clubs also affected Volyn. During the third and fourth championships of Ukraine, the team performed well, twice taking 11th place in the table, and twice reaching the quarterfinals of the Cup of Ukraine.

The team was "pulled" by experienced veterans, and there was no young replacement worthy of them. So when Antonyuk, Polnyi, Fedetskyi, Burch were unable to play, the team went into decline. After a series of bleak matches at the beginning of the 1994–95 season, the fans forced Roman Pokora to leave the coaching post. Vitaliy Kvartsyanyi took over the team again. "Volyn" managed to keep its place in the top league that season. But... The lack of effective support from sponsors and authorities did not contribute to the improvement of results. However, at the beginning of the second half, the local authorities helped dismiss Kvartsyanyi from the position of head coach, and Yuriy Dyachuk-Stavytskyi took his place. He failed to find mutual understanding with the players and Volyn was relegated to the First League (Persha Liha).

Its former player Anatoliy Radenko was called to elevate the team in class. And at first he succeeded. In the 1996–97 season, a 90% changed team, in which many young players appeared, showed a super game. After the first half, the Lutsk players secured second place. But financial problems remained unresolved - key players had to be sold. As a result, in the second half, the "Luchans" could not stand the competition with more powerful rivals and settled for fourth place.

Hopes rested on the next season. But after four rounds, Anatoliy Radenko left the team, in the winter, Volodymyr Hapon and Anatoliy Tymoshchuk were sold to replenish the club's coffers. Thus, "Volyn" established itself in the status of strong middle peasants of the first league. But the championship of 1998–99 could have ended in a disaster - having suffered seven defeats in a row in the second half, the Luchans came close to the relegation zone. Everything was decided in the last match of the season against Shakhtar-2 Donetsk. To the credit of the Luchans, losing 2–0 in the 20th minute and having a suspended player, they managed to gather themselves and save the match - 5–2. After a certain rise in the ninth championship, in the 2000–01 season "Volyn" went into an uncontrolled freefall. Only Oleh Fedyukov remained from the previous season's lineup. A bleak play during the first half barely allowed the Luchans to go to the break in 15th place, behind which was the Second League (Druha Liha).

In this difficult moment, a well-known businessman who became the new president of the club - Vasyl Stolyar and head coach Vitaliy Kvartsyanyi - came to the team's aid, who set the goal of reaching the top league. In the second half, "Volyn" rose to the ninth position in the table, having won an enchanting victory over CSKA-2 Kyiv - 7–0 in the last match. And in the 2001–02 championship, Vitaliy Kvartsyanyi led "Volyn" to gold medals for the second time.

Even before the start of the season, experts noted "Volyn" as one of the main contenders for entry to the top league, because the team gathered many qualified and experienced players. And so it happened - the team passed the season in one breath. One hundred percent result was recorded in home matches. And from September 20, 2001 to April 8, 2002, the team went on a 13-game winning streak. With seven rounds to go, the players of Luchan secured a place in the top league, and in three - they ahead of time became champions. Volyn striker Vasyl Sachko became the top scorer of the league with 17 goals.

The gold medals of the Champions of the 2001–02 Ukrainian First League were awarded to: goalkeepers - Yuriy Nikitenko, Roman Nesterenko; defenders - Oleh Fedyukov, Yuriy Kondakov, Vitaliy Rozghon, Lyubomyr Halchuk, Yaroslav Komzyuk; midfielders - Volodymyr Hashchyn, Yuriy Dudnyk, Serhiy Honcharenko, Andriy Pisnyi, Volodymyr Hapon, Dmytro Topchiyev, Oleksandr Aharin; attackers - Vasyl Sachko, Serhiy Kryvyi, Oleksandr Hrebenozhko, Volodymyr Lutsenko, Viktor Matsyuk, Serhiy Hordun, Vadym Solodkyi, Oleksandr Stolyarchuk. Club president - Vasyl Stolyar, head coach - Vitaliy Kvartsyanyi, coach - Petro Kushlyk.

The 2002–03 season also turned out to be successful - "Volyn" performed impressively for a newcomer. There twice was beaten 2–0 and 3–1 the champion - Shakhtar Donetsk, the Volyn team defeated the new champion - Dynamo Kyiv 1–0 at home, and the team reached the semi-finals of the Cup of Ukraine. The sixth place was a reward for such successes. But things went badly in the future - in the championship of 2003–04 during the first eight rounds, the Luchans did not win a single victory. The team managed to leave the relegation zone at the end of the first half at the cost of superpowers... However, the high-quality additional staffing of "Volyn" in the off-season allowed the team to feel confident in the second half and solve the main task - a berth place in the top league was preserved. The next championship was ambiguous for "Volyn" - starting from the start of the season, the Luchans entered the struggle for a place in the "UEFA competitions qualification zone", but in the middle of the second half, the team suffered a decline - draws were followed by defeats, and in the end - only eighth place, although during the 25 rounds, the Volyn team confidently stayed in the top four. The 2005–06 season also followed a similar scenario. Despite some instability, "Volyn" came in third place at the finish of the first half. However, the catastrophic situation with the club's finances led to the outflow of the "core" players and a slow fall to the bottom of the tournament table. Something happened that no one believed in - after the last round, the Luchans had to part with the elite division of Ukrainian football.

In the Persha Liha, joined with young players the team played rather unstable and, despite regular victories over the leaders, managed to lose points in matches against unambitious opponents. The start in the 2007–08 season was not bad, but after unsuccessfully holding the second half, the Luchan team finished only ninth. "Volyn" got a chance to compete for promotion in the next season, but in the winter the coaching staff carried out a significant revamp of the team with youth, getting rid of a number of leading performers. Despite the fears of the fans, the team, whose average age was about twenty years old, managed to win the fifth place in the final standings "on nerves". In the same year, Oleksandr Pyshchur repeated the record of 1989, scoring 22 goals during the season, and became the top scorer of the Persha Liha, and also received the title of the best player of the League by the PFL.

Before the start of the 2009–10 championship, the club management hinted that the team was ready to finally compete for promotion. In the off-season, "Volyn" carried out a solid personnel reinforcement and from the first rounds joined the fight to enter the Ukrainian Premier League. At the same time, the Volyn players performed quite successfully in the Ukrainian Cup competitions, defeating "Kryvbas" and "Metalurh" from Zaporizhia, and reached the semi-finals of the National Cup. The team had to fight on "two fronts" and went to the winter break with a noticeable lag behind the leading three. However, the spring part of the season, despite the defeat in the cup semi-final, turned out to be more than successful for "Volyn". Defeating opponents at home and away, having won eleven consecutive victories at the finish line, "Volyn" eliminated more than a ten-point gap from first place and only by coincidence finished second and returned to the elite of Ukrainian football.

The first season after returning to the Premier League became unsettling for "Volyn". The team started very badly. During the summer and the beginning of autumn, the team had a very hard time gaining points, but in October–November it "discharged" so much that at the beginning of December everyone was praying for the end of each match, because a little more and "Volyn" had a chance to break into the top five teams of the Ukrainian Premier League. But the spring part of the 2010–11 championship was a failure, and in 11 matches, the Luchans took only 7 points. As a result - 11th place at the end of the season.

The start of the 2011–12 season was remembered for the victory of Luchans over "Dnipro" on the road - 2–1 and confident performances in August. Later, the team slowed down and further things in the championship did not stick together again, but in the Ukrainian Cup "Volyn" once again made a great "run": at the Round of 32, there was completely defeated "Illichivets" - 7–1, and in the Round of 16 - "Dnipro" - 3–2, considering that Luchans were losing 2–0 and remained with ten players after goalkeeper Vitaliy Nedilko was sent off in the middle of the first half. In January 2012, "Volyn" unexpectedly received a new head coach - Anatoliy Demyanenko. However, the new coach failed to achieve anything significant. Only Maicon, the striker of "Volyn" - became the top scorer of the 2011–12 Ukrainian Premier League with 14 goals, and the team once again did not pass the semi-final stage of the Ukrainian Cup. The following season was a year of disappointments, and when "Volyn" was on the verge of relegation from the Premier League, Vitaliy Kvartsyanyi was again invited to the helm of the team, who successfully coped with the task of keeping the team's place in the league.

After his return, Kvartsyanyi had to create a new team - the composition of "Volyn" changed by 80-90%. However, the team spent the first half of the season very decently, as it drew with "Dynamo" in Kyiv (1–1), victory over "Shakhtar" (2–0) and drew with "Chornomorets" in Odessa (0–0). But the youth of the new team showed itself and the game of "Volyn" was not stable. The second part of the 2013–14 championship, which was postponed for 2 weeks due to the political situation in the country and the Russian aggression against Ukraine, was more of a failure. After scoring seven points in the first three matches of spring 2014 (including a 1–0 victory over "Karpaty" in Lviv), the team of Luchans lost eight matches in a row.

In the 2014–15 season, "Volyn" entered with newcomers loaned from "Dnipro" - Kobakhidze, Politylo, Polyovyi. After the first round, experienced Shust and Sharpar joined the team. This is how the main composition of the team gradually crystallized, which gained good momentum at the end of the first and second stages of the tournament distance. "Volyn" did very well in November–December 2014 and May 2015. Almost until the end of the tournament distance, the team fought for 5-6 places in the tournament table, which could not be achieved due to purely organizational problems, more precisely - financial ones. "Volyn" had 38 goals scored in the season, a victory in the Ukrainian Cup over the finalist of the Europa League "Dnipro" (1–0), a draw with "Shakhtar" at home (0–0), six matches in which the team managed to score three and more goals and an individual victory of Eric Bicfalvi, who, finishing his performances for Volyn, became the top scorer of the championship together with Shakhtar player Alex Teixeira (17 goals).

== Team names ==
Over the course of its history, the club carried two names Volyn which is a Ukrainian spelling of historical region of Volhynia and Torpedo which in the Soviet Union was a generic name of those clubs that represented some automobile makers.

Year	Name
1960–67	Volyn
1968–71	Torpedo
1972–76	SC Lutsk
1977–88	Torpedo
1989-01	Volyn
2001–02	SC Volyn-1
2002–	Volyn

=== Football kits and sponsors ===
Years	Football kit	Shirt sponsor
2002–2004	lotto	-
2004–2005	korn	-
2005–2006	adidas	-
2010–2012	puma	-
2012–2014	adidas	-
2014–present	kappa	vodafone

== Rivalry ==
Volyn's biggest rival today is Karpaty Lviv. The match between is called the Galician-Volhynian rivalry. The stadiums in Lutsk and Lviv are nearly full for matches between the two teams. This derbys are the main football events in western Ukraine.

All time rival of Volyn Lutsk is FC Veres Rivne. The rivalry exists since the creation of club in 1960 and is known as Volhynian rivalry.

=== Galician-Volhynian rivalry ===
Year	Tournament	Home	Away	Score
1990	Soviet Second League	FC Volyn Lutsk	FC Karpaty Lviv	2–2
1990	Soviet Second League	FC Karpaty Lviv	FC Volyn Lutsk	1–0
1991	Soviet Second League	FC Volyn Lutsk	FC Karpaty Lviv	0–1
1991	Soviet Second League	FC Karpaty Lviv	FC Volyn Lutsk	0–1
13.09.1992	Ukrainian Top League	FC Volyn Lutsk	FC Karpaty Lviv	3–2
23.05.1993	Ukrainian Top League	FC Karpaty Lviv	FC Volyn Lutsk	2–1
05.09.1993	Ukrainian Top League	FC Volyn Lutsk	FC Karpaty Lviv	1–0
28.05.1994	Ukrainian Top League	FC Karpaty Lviv	FC Volyn Lutsk	1–2
22.07.1994	Ukrainian Top League	FC Karpaty Lviv	FC Volyn Lutsk	1–0
19.06.1995	Ukrainian Top League	FC Volyn Lutsk	FC Karpaty Lviv	3–0
05.11.1995	Ukrainian Top League	FC Karpaty Lviv	FC Volyn Lutsk	2–1
13.03.1996	Ukrainian Top League	FC Volyn Lutsk	FC Karpaty Lviv	1–0
01.09.2002	Ukrainian Top League	FC Karpaty Lviv	FC Volyn Lutsk	0–2
04.05.2003	Ukrainian Top League	FC Volyn Lutsk	FC Karpaty Lviv	0–1
25.10.2003	Ukrainian Top League	FC Volyn Lutsk	FC Karpaty Lviv	1–0
27.03.2004	Ukrainian Top League	FC Karpaty Lviv	FC Volyn Lutsk	0–1
30.08.2010	Ukrainian Premier League	FC Karpaty Lviv	FC Volyn Lutsk	1–0
03.04.2011	Ukrainian Premier League	FC Volyn Lutsk	FC Karpaty Lviv	0–3
01.10.2011	Ukrainian Premier League	FC Volyn Lutsk	FC Karpaty Lviv	0–2
16.04.2012	Ukrainian Premier League	FC Karpaty Lviv	FC Volyn Lutsk	1–0
13.07.2012	Ukrainian Premier League	FC Volyn Lutsk	FC Karpaty Lviv	1–1
18.11.2012	Ukrainian Premier League	FC Karpaty Lviv	FC Volyn Lutsk	2–0
19.08.2013	Ukrainian Premier League	FC Volyn Lutsk	FC Karpaty Lviv	1–1
15.03.2014	Ukrainian Premier League	FC Karpaty Lviv	FC Volyn Lutsk	0–1
17.08.2014	Ukrainian Premier League	FC Volyn Lutsk	FC Karpaty Lviv	0–2
13.03.2015	Ukrainian Premier League	FC Karpaty Lviv	FC Volyn Lutsk	0–2
27.09.2015	Ukrainian Premier League	FC Karpaty Lviv	FC Volyn Lutsk	0–2
17.04.2016	Ukrainian Premier League	FC Volyn Lutsk	FC Karpaty Lviv	0–0
02.10.2016	Ukrainian Premier League	FC Volyn Lutsk	FC Karpaty Lviv	1–1
11.03.2017	Ukrainian Premier League	FC Karpaty Lviv	FC Volyn Lutsk	

=== Volhynian rivalry ===
The regional rivalry includes games between Avanhard Rovno and SC Lutsk (last one being represented by the Carpathian Military District).

Year	Tournament	Home	Away	Score
1960	Class B	FC Volyn Lutsk	FC Kolhospnyk Rivne	0–1
1960	Class B	FC Kolhospnyk Rivne	FC Volyn Lutsk	3–2
1961	Class B	FC Volyn Lutsk	FC Kolhospnyk Rivne	4–1
1961	Class B	FC Kolhospnyk Rivne	FC Volyn Lutsk	3–1
1962	Class B	FC Volyn Lutsk	FC Kolhospnyk Rivne	2–1
1962	Class B	FC Kolhospnyk Rivne	FC Volyn Lutsk	4–0
1963	Class B	FC Volyn Lutsk	FC Kolhospnyk Rivne	0–1
1963	Class B	FC Kolhospnyk Rivne	FC Volyn Lutsk	0–2
1964	Class B	FC Volyn Lutsk	FC Kolhospnyk Rivne	1–0
1964	Class B	FC Kolhospnyk Rivne	FC Volyn Lutsk	2–0
1965	Class B	FC Volyn Lutsk	FC Kolhospnyk Rivne	1–0
1965	Class B	FC Kolhospnyk Rivne	FC Volyn Lutsk	2–2
1966	Class B	FC Volyn Lutsk	FC Kolhospnyk Rivne	2–1
1966	Class B	FC Kolhospnyk Rivne	FC Volyn Lutsk	2–0
1967	Class B	FC Volyn Lutsk	FC Horyn Rivne	1–0
1967	Class B	FC Horyn Rivne	FC Volyn Lutsk	3–1
1968	Class B	FC Torpedo Lutsk	FC Horyn Rivne	0–0
1968	Class B	FC Horyn Rivne	FC Torpedo Lutsk	1–1
1969	Class B	FC Torpedo Lutsk	FC Horyn Rivne	1–3
1969	Class B	FC Horyn Rivne	FC Torpedo Lutsk	2–0
1970	Class B	FC Torpedo Lutsk	FC Horyn Rivne	0–0
1970	Class B	FC Horyn Rivne	FC Torpedo Lutsk	0–1
1971	Soviet Second League	FC Torpedo Lutsk	FC Horyn Rivne	1–0
1971	Soviet Second League	FC Horyn Rivne	FC Torpedo Lutsk	1–0
1972	Soviet Second League	SC Lutsk	FC Avanhard Rivne	0–0
1972	Soviet Second League	FC Avanhard Rivne	SC Lutsk	1–1
1973	Soviet Second League	SC Lutsk	FC Avanhard Rivne	1–1
1973	Soviet Second League	FC Avanhard Rivne	SC Lutsk	1–1
1974	Soviet Second League	SC Lutsk	FC Avanhard Rivne	2–1
1974	Soviet Second League	FC Avanhard Rivne	SC Lutsk	1–0
1975	Soviet Second League	SC Lutsk	FC Avanhard Rivne	2–0
1975	Soviet Second League	FC Avanhard Rivne	SC Lutsk	0–2
1976	Soviet Second League	SC Lutsk	FC Avanhard Rivne	1–0
1976	Soviet Second League	FC Avanhard Rivne	SC Lutsk	1–0
1977	Soviet Second League	FC Torpedo Lutsk	FC Avanhard Rivne	3–1
1977	Soviet Second League	FC Avanhard Rivne	FC Torpedo Lutsk	4–0
1978	Soviet Second League	FC Torpedo Lutsk	FC Avanhard Rivne	1–0
1978	Soviet Second League	FC Avanhard Rivne	FC Torpedo Lutsk	5–1
1979	Soviet Second League	FC Torpedo Lutsk	FC Avanhard Rivne	1–1
1979	Soviet Second League	FC Avanhard Rivne	FC Torpedo Lutsk	3–0
1980	Soviet Second League	FC Torpedo Lutsk	FC Avanhard Rivne	1–1
1980	Soviet Second League	FC Avanhard Rivne	FC Torpedo Lutsk	2–1
1981	Soviet Second League	FC Torpedo Lutsk	FC Avanhard Rivne	0–0
1981	Soviet Second League	FC Avanhard Rivne	FC Torpedo Lutsk	1–0
1982	Soviet Second League	FC Torpedo Lutsk	FC Avanhard Rivne	1–1
1982	Soviet Second League	FC Avanhard Rivne	FC Torpedo Lutsk	3–1
1983	Soviet Second League	FC Torpedo Lutsk	FC Avanhard Rivne	2–0
1983	Soviet Second League	FC Avanhard Rivne	FC Torpedo Lutsk	3–2
1984	Soviet Second League	FC Torpedo Lutsk	FC Avanhard Rivne	3–1
1984	Soviet Second League	FC Avanhard Rivne	FC Torpedo Lutsk	1–0
1985	Soviet Second League	FC Torpedo Lutsk	FC Avanhard Rivne	4–0
1985	Soviet Second League	FC Avanhard Rivne	FC Torpedo Lutsk	1–1
1986	Soviet Second League	FC Torpedo Lutsk	FC Avanhard Rivne	2–0
1986	Soviet Second League	FC Avanhard Rivne	FC Torpedo Lutsk	1–2
1987	Soviet Second League	FC Torpedo Lutsk	FC Avanhard Rivne	1–0
1987	Soviet Second League	FC Avanhard Rivne	FC Torpedo Lutsk	0–1
1988	Soviet Second League	FC Torpedo Lutsk	FC Avanhard Rivne	3–2
1988	Soviet Second League	FC Avanhard Rivne	FC Torpedo Lutsk	3–2
1989	Soviet Second League	FC Volyn Lutsk	FC Avanhard Rivne	2–0
1989	Soviet Second League	FC Avanhard Rivne	FC Volyn Lutsk	0–0
01.11.1992	Ukrainian Top League	FC Veres Rivne	FC Volyn Lutsk	2–1
02.04.1993	Ukrainian Top League	FC Volyn Lutsk	FC Veres Rivne	1–0
08.10.1993	Ukrainian Top League	FC Veres Rivne	FC Volyn Lutsk	0–0
22.04.1994	Ukrainian Top League	FC Volyn Lutsk	FC Veres Rivne	1–1
31.07.1994	Ukrainian Top League	FC Veres Rivne	FC Volyn Lutsk	2–1
05.06.1995	Ukrainian Top League	FC Volyn Lutsk	FC Veres Rivne	2–1
04.08.1996	Ukrainian First League	FC Volyn Lutsk	FC Veres Rivne	1–0
20.06.1997	Ukrainian First League	FC Veres Rivne	FC Volyn Lutsk	0–1

== Officials ==
- 1992 Anatoliy Banasevych (president)
- 2006 – 2000 Anatoliy Banasevych (president)
- 2002 – 2013 Vasyl Stolyar (president)
- 2013 – 2017 Vitaliy Kvartsyanyi (president)
  - 2017 – Vitaliy Kvartsyanyi (honorary president)
- Ihor Palytsia

== Head coaches ==
- (Soviet Union) Borys Nyemets (1960)
- (Soviet Union) Mykola Havrylyuk (1960)
- (Soviet Union) Yevhen Horbunov (1961)
- (Soviet Union) Volodymyr Yeremeyev (1962–64)
- (Soviet Union) Dmytro Alimov (1965)
- (Soviet Union) Yuriy Holovey (1965–68)
- (Soviet Union) Borys Voloschuk (1968–69)
- (Soviet Union) Yuriy Avanesov (1970–71)
- (Soviet Union) Mykhaylo Rybak (1972–73)
- (Soviet Union) Ernest Kesler (1974–76)
- (Soviet Union) Volodymyr Baysarovych (1977–78)
- (Soviet Union) Yevhen Pyestov (1979)
- (Soviet Union) Vyacheslav Pershyn (1980–83)

- (Soviet Union) Myron Markevych (1984–87)
- (Soviet Union) Vitaliy Kvartsyanyi (1988–91)
- (Ukraine) Myron Markevych (Jan 1992 – June 92)
- (Ukraine) Roman Pokora (Aug 1992 – Sept 94)
- (Ukraine) Leonid Bakay (interim) (Sept 1994)
- (Ukraine) Vitaliy Kvartsyanyi (Sept 1994 – April 1996)
- (Ukraine) Oleksiy Yeschenko (interim) (April 1996)
- (Ukraine) Yuriy Dyachuk-Stavytskyi (April 1996 – June 1996)
- (Ukraine) Anatoliy Radenko (July 1996 – June 1997)
- (Ukraine) Oleksiy Yeschenko (July 1997 – Nov 1997)
- (Ukraine) Yuriy Shulyatytskyi (Jan 1998 – May 1999)
- (Ukraine) Oleksiy Yeschenko (May 1999 – Nov 2000)
- (Ukraine) Vitaliy Kvartsyanyi (Jan 2001 – June 2003)

- (Ukraine) Stepan Pavlov (interim) (June 2003)
- (Ukraine) Vitaliy Kvartsyanyi (July 2003 – Dec 27, 2011)
- (Ukraine) Anatoliy Demyanenko (Jan 5, 2012 – April 25, 2013)
- (Ukraine) Anatoliy Piskovets (interim) (April 25, 2013 – May 6, 2013)
- (Ukraine) Vitaliy Kvartsyanyi (interim) (May 7, 2013 – June 2013)
- (Ukraine) Vitaliy Kvartsyanyi (June 2013 – July 2017)
- (Ukraine) Yaroslav Komziuk (July 2017 – August 2017)
- (Ukraine) Albert Shakhov (interim) (August 2017 – November 2017)
- (Ukraine) Viktor Bohatyr (December 2017 – May 2018)
- (Ukraine) Andriy Tlumak (1 June 2018 – 14 August 2020)
- (Ukraine) Vasyl Sachko (19 August 2020 – 26 June 2021)
- (Ukraine) Albert Shakhov (27 June 2021 – 2022)

== Club's top scorers and appearance leaders ==
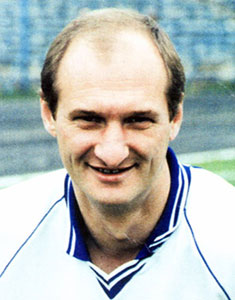
Oleh Fedyukov

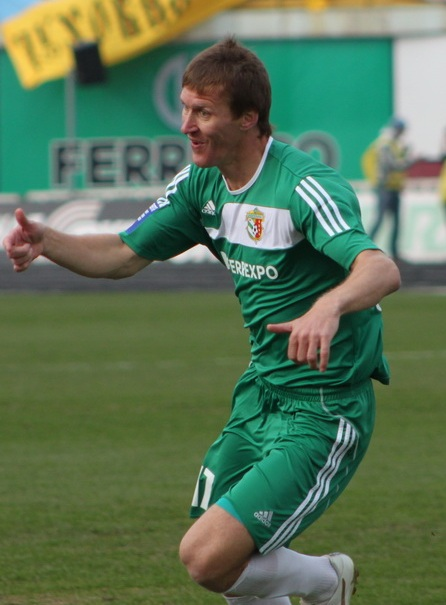
Vasyl Sachko

All-time club's appearance leaders
Rank	Player	Games
1	(Soviet Union) / (Ukraine) Oleh Fedyukov	563
2	(Soviet Union) / (Ukraine) Andriy Fedetskyi	545
3	(Soviet Union) / (Ukraine) Volodymyr Mozolyuk	502
4	(Soviet Union) / (Ukraine) Mykhailo Burch	456
5	(Soviet Union) / (Ukraine) Ivan Polnyi	341
6	(Soviet Union) Volodymyr Berdovskyi	324
7	(Soviet Union) / (Ukraine) Pavlo Filonyuk	323
8	(Soviet Union) / (Ukraine) Volodymyr Antonyuk	321
9	(Soviet Union) / (Ukraine) Volodymyr Dykyi	300
10	(Soviet Union) Ihor Polnyi	284

All-time club's scorers
Rank	Player	Goals	Games
1	(Soviet Union) / (Ukraine) Andriy Fedetskyi	91	545
1	(Soviet Union) / (Ukraine) Volodymyr Dykyi	91	300
3	(Soviet Union) / (Ukraine) Volodymyr Mozolyuk	89	502
4	(Ukraine) Vasyl Sachko	63	171
5	(Soviet Union) / (Ukraine) Pavlo Filonyuk	60	323
6	(Soviet Union) Volodymyr Berdovskyi	54	324
7	(Ukraine) Oleksandr Pyschur	52	110
8	(Soviet Union) / (Ukraine) Volodymyr Hashchyn	42	248
9	(Brazil) Maicon	39	57
9	(Ukraine) Serhiy Dranytskyi	39	154

== Honors ==
- Ukrainian First League
  - Winners (1): 2001–02
- Football Championship of the Ukrainian SSR
  - Winner (1): 1989

== League and cup history ==
=== Soviet Union ===
Season	Div.	Pos.	Pl.	W	D	L	GS	GA	P	Soviet Cup	Other	Notes
Torpedo
1985	3rd (Vtoraya Liga)	8	26	10	9	7	30	23	29			Ukrainian Championship
1985	3rd (Vtoraya Liga)	15	14	6	6	2	21	12	18			Ukrainian Championship
1986	3rd (Vtoraya Liga)	4	26	13	6	7	27	20	32			Ukrainian Championship
1986	3rd (Vtoraya Liga)	5	14	6	3	5	23	19	15			Ukrainian Championship
1987	3rd (Vtoraya Liga)	16	52	18	10	24	55	63	46			Ukrainian Championship
1988	3rd (Vtoraya Liga)	8	50	21	13	16	60	64	55	1/16 finals		Ukrainian Championship
Volyn
1989	3rd (Vtoraya Liga)	1	52	32	14	6	84	38	78			Ukrainian Championship
1989	3rd (Vtoraya Liga)	2	4	0	3	1	2	5	3			
1990	3rd (Vtoraya Liga)	17	42	14	7	21	42	61	35			
1991	3rd (Vtoraya Liga)	8	42	19	7	16	46	33	45	1/64 finals		

=== Ukraine ===
Season	Div.	Pos.	Pl.	W	D	L	GS	GA	P	Domestic Cup	Europe	Notes
1992	1st (Vyshcha Liha)	5	18	8	2	8	24	21	18	1/32 finals		
1992–93	1st (Vyshcha Liha)	11	30	10	6	14	37	54	26	1/4 finals		
1993–94	1st (Vyshcha Liha)	11	34	10	12	12	27	30	32	1/4 finals		
1994–95	1st (Vyshcha Liha)	15	34	11	3	20	29	58	36	1/16 finals		
1995–96	1st (Vyshcha Liha)	17	34	9	7	18	34	58	34	1/8 finals		Relegated
1996–97	2nd (Persha Liha)	4	46	26	5	15	62	47	57	1/8 finals		
1997–98	2nd (Persha Liha)	9	42	19	8	15	56	45	65	1/16 finals		
1998–99	2nd (Persha Liha)	14	38	16	3	19	36	43	51	1/64 finals		
1999-00	2nd (Persha Liha)	10	34	13	9	12	42	41	48	1/16 finals		
2000–01	2nd (Persha Liha)	9	34	13	5	16	41	38	44	1/16 finals		
2001–02	2nd (Persha Liha)	1	34	25	3	6	56	24	78	1/16 finals		Promoted
2002–03	1st (Vyshcha Liha)	6	30	12	5	13	37	44	41	1/2 finals		
2003–04	1st (Vyshcha Liha)	13	30	7	8	15	25	44	29	1/8 finals		
2004–05	1st (Vyshcha Liha)	8	30	11	7	12	35	37	40	1/4 finals		
2005–06	1st (Vyshcha Liha)	15	30	9	6	15	31	45	33	1/16 finals		Relegated
2006–07	2nd (Persha Liha)	12	36	13	7	16	40	48	46	1/16 finals		
2007–08	2nd (Persha Liha)	9	38	16	8	14	61	55	53	1/32 finals		–3
2008–09	2nd (Persha Liha)	5	32	15	5	12	48	46	50	1/32 finals		
2009–10	2nd (Persha Liha)	2	34	22	8	4	71	30	74	1/2 finals		Promoted
2010–11	1st (Vyshcha Liha)	11	30	9	7	14	27	49	34	1/8 finals		
2011–12	1st (Vyshcha Liha)	12	30	7	6	17	25	43	27	1/2 finals		
2012–13	1st (Vyshcha Liha)	13	30	7	8	15	26	45	29	1/4 finals		
2013–14	1st (Vyshcha Liha)	13	28	7	6	15	25	51	24	1/16 finals		−3
2014–15	1st (Vyshcha Liha)	9	26	9	7	10	38	44	25	1/8 finals		–9
2015–16	1st (Vyshcha Liha)	12	26	10	8	8	36	36	20	1/4 finals		–18
2016–17	1st (Vyshcha Liha)	12	32	4	4	24	17	51	10	1/8 finals		Relegated; −6
2017–18	2nd (Persha Liha)	13	34	11	3	20	31	44	36	1/32 finals		
2018–19	2nd (Persha Liha)	3	28	17	7	4	55	30	52	1/16 finals		Promotion playoff lost; –6 (Note: Volyn Lutsk was deducted six points according to a decision by FIFA Disciplinary Committee for a debt to a Serbian club FK Rad related to the transfer of Ivan Rogac.)
2019–20	2nd (Persha Liha)	5	30	17	6	7	57	36	57	1/16 finals		
2020–21	2nd (Persha Liha)	7	30	13	7	10	39	28	46	1/32 finals		
2021–22	2nd (Persha Liha)	10	19	6	7	6	17	20	25	1/16 finals		Withdrew due to war

== Volyn-2 Lutsk ==
Volyn-2 Lutsk was a reserve squad of FC Volyn Lutsk that competed in the AAFU competitions in 1997–98. It was fielded once again for the 2020–21 Ukrainian Second League season.

Season	Div.	Pos.	Pl.	W	D	L	GS	GA	P	Domestic Cup	Europe	Notes
1997–98	4th (Amatory)	7	14	4	1	9	6	15	13			
at regional level
2020–21	3rd (Druha Liha)	12	24	3	4	17	16	43	13	N / A		Withdrew

Between 2001 and 2003 for two seasons there also existed Kovel-Volyn-2 as the farm team of Volyn Lutsk, but based on a separate club out of Kovel. That team played at the third tier (Druha Liha).

== See also ==
FC Kovel-Volyn Kovel
