= 2017–18 Ukrainian Second League =

Ukrainian Second League
- Season: 2017–18
- Dates: 14 July 2017 – 19 May 2018
- Champions: Ahrobiznes Volochysk
- Promoted: Ahrobiznes Volochysk; SC Dnipro-1; Prykarpattia Ivano-Frankivsk; Metalist 1925 Kharkiv
- Relegated: FC Dnipro; ~~Arsenal-Kyivshchyna~~ (withdrew); ~~Ternopil~~ (withdrew); ~~Skala~~ (withdrew); ~~Inhulets-2~~ (withdrew); ~~Metalurh (Rosso-Nero)~~ (withdrew); ~~Sudnobudivnyk~~ (withdrew)
- Matches: 326
- Goals: 913 (2.8 per match)
- Top goalscorer: 23 – Serhiy Davydov (Metalist)
- Biggest home win: 9 – Tavriya 9–0 Metalurh (Round 33)
- Biggest away win: 11 – Metalurh 0–11 Enerhiya (Round 21)
- Highest scoring: 11 – Metalurh 0–11 Enerhiya (Round 21)
- Longest winning run: 10 – SC Dnipro-1 (Round 17–26)
- Longest unbeaten run: 18 – Metalist (Round 3–20)
- Longest winless run: 18 – Metalurh (Round 16–33)
- Longest losing run: 13 – Metalurh (Round 21–33)
- Highest attendance: 14,521 - Metalist – SC Dnipro-1 (Round 12)
- Lowest attendance: 0 (Note: Round 22 game was played in Obukhiv) - Bukovyna – Skala (Round 2); Bukovyna – Polissya (ppd. Round 7); Prykarpattia – Podillya (Round 19); FC Dnipro – Sudnobudivnyk (Round 22)
- All statistics correct as of 2 June 2018.

The 2017–18 Ukrainian Second League was the 27th season since its establishment. The competition commenced on 14 July 2017. The league returned to the multiple group competition format after it was abandoned in 2013. Final composition of the league was approved at the PFL Conference on 21 June 2017.

The current season competition is in a triple round robin format for each group.

Group A commenced their winter break after the Round 7 postponed match was played on 12 November 2017. Group B will begin their winter break after the completion of Round 22 on 19 November 2017. Group B competitions resumed the spring session on 30 March 2018 and Group A on 31 March 2018.

== Teams ==
On 21 June 2017, it was announced that 25 teams will play in two divisions, but later FC Balkany Zorya was transferred to the 2017–18 Ukrainian First League and FC Cherkaskyi Dnipro-2 withdrew from the competition, leaving 23 teams in the field.

=== Promoted teams ===
The following six teams were promoted from the 2016–17 Ukrainian Football Amateur League:

- Ahrobiznes Volochysk – group 1 winners, amateur champions (debut)
- Metalist 1925 Kharkiv – group 2 winners (debut)
- Polissya Zhytomyr – 6th place in group 2 (debut; a club with the same name competed in the 2000–01 season)
- Nyva Ternopil – 7th place in group 1 (returning after an absence of four seasons)
- Tavriya Simferopol – 9th place in group 2 (debut)
- FC Lviv – 10th place in group 1 (debut)

Also, one newly created team was admitted:

- SC Dnipro-1 – (debut)

Also, one reserve team was admitted:

- MFC Mykolaiv-2 – (debut)

=== Relegated teams ===
One team was relegated from the 2016–17 Ukrainian Premier League, according to the FIFA sanctions:

- FC Dnipro – 11th place (debut)

The following teams were relegated from the 2016–17 Ukrainian First League.

- Bukovyna Chernivtsi – 16th place (returning after one season)
- Skala Stryi – 17th place (returning after one season)
- FC Ternopil – 18th place (returning after an absence of three seasons)

=== Renamed teams ===
- Teplovyk-Prykarpattia Ivano-Frankivsk – prior to the start of the season the club was renamed to FC Prykarpattia Ivano-Frankivsk.

=== Withdrawn teams ===
- Illichivets-2 Mariupol – before the start of the season, the club chose to compete in the Under-21 league.
- Cherkaskyi Dnipro-2 – initially, the team passed attestation and was admitted to the PFL, but before the start of the season general director of FC Cherkaskyi Dnipro announced that the club's second team won't take part in professional competitions. The President of the PFL expressed a hope that the league would find a replacement. but no other teams entered the competition.
- FC Ternopil – After competing in four matches on 15 August 2017 the club informed the PFL that they are withdrawing from the competition. PFL annulled all their matches.

=== Location map ===
The following map displays the location of teams. Group A teams marked in red. Group B teams marked in green.

Home venues of teams in the 2017–18 Ukrainian Second League. SC Tavriya played the home games in Nova Kakhovka.

=== Stadiums ===
Group A
Team	Stadium	Position in 2016–17
Ahrobiznes Volochysk	Yunist Stadium	Am1, 1st
Ahrobiznes Volochysk	Sport Complex Podillya (Note: Due to the reconstruction of the home ground in 2018 Ahrobiznes moved their games to Khmelnytskyi)	Am1, 1st
Arsenal-Kyivshchyna Bila Tserkva	Volodymyr Melnyk Stadium (Note: Arsenal-Kyivshchyna Bila Tserkva originally played at Trudovi Reservy Stadium in Bila Tserkva, but prior to Round 10 announced that their administration is moving the club to Obukhiv.)	15th
Arsenal-Kyivshchyna Bila Tserkva	Arsenal–Kyiv Training Base	15th
Bukovyna Chernivtsi	Bukovyna Stadium	FL, 16th
FC Lviv	Skif Stadium	Am1, 10th
FC Lviv	Sokil Stadium	Am1, 10th
Nyva Ternopil	Vyshnyvets United Community Stadium (Note: Nyva Ternopil plays their home matches at the newly built Vyshnyvets United Community Stadium in a town of Vyshnivets)	Am1, 7th
Nyva-V Vinnytsia	Sports Complex Nyva	7th
Nyva-V Vinnytsia	Central City Stadium (Note: Round 23 game against Bukovyna was played at main city arena.)	7th
Podillya Khmelnytskyi	Sport Complex Podillya	14th
Polissya Zhytomyr	Spartak Stadium (Note: Polissya Zhytomyr play their home matches at Spartak Stadium in Korosten while their home stadium is under renovation.)	Am2, 6th
Polissya Zhytomyr	Volodymyr Melnyk Stadium	Am2, 6th
Polissya Zhytomyr	Avanhard Stadium (Note: Polissya moved their home games in the spring session to Novohrad-Volynskyi due to the construction of both the Central Stadium and the Spartak Stadium)	Am2, 6th
Prykarpattia Ivano-Frankivsk	MCS Rukh	10th
Prykarpattia Ivano-Frankivsk	Khet-Tryk Stadium (Note: The game Podillya-Prykarpattia was moved to Ivano-Frankivsk and the hosting team was switched)	10th
Skala Stryi	Medyk Stadium (Note: Skala Stryi play their home matches at Medyk Stadium in Morshyn due to the inability to reach an agreement for the lease of Sokil Stadium in Stryi.)	FL, 17th
Skala Stryi	Skala Training Base	FL, 17th
~~FC Ternopil~~	Ternopil City Stadium	FL, 18th

Group B
Team	Stadium	Position in 2016–17
FC Dnipro	Dnipro-Arena	PL, 11th
FC Dnipro	Indoor Arena Dnipro-1 Training Base	PL, 11th
FC Dnipro	Metalurh Stadium (Note: Round 28 match moved to Novomoskovsk due to home ground used by SC Dnipro-1)	PL, 11th
SC Dnipro-1	Dnipro-Arena	–
SC Dnipro-1	Indoor Arena at Dnipro-1 Training Base	–
Enerhiya Nova Kakhovka	Enerhiya Stadium	8th
Inhulets-2 Petrove	Povoroznyuk Stadium (Note: Located in the village of Volodymyrivka, Petrove Raion, Kirovohrad Oblast)	6th
Metalist 1925 Kharkiv	Metalist Stadium	Am2, 1st
Metalurh Zaporizhzhia	Metalurh Training Base	16th
MFC Mykolaiv-2	Central City Stadium	– (Note: MFC Mykolaiv-2 participated in football competitions of Mykolaiv Oblast)
MFC Mykolaiv-2	Park Peremohy Stadium	–
Myr Hornostayivka	Zatys Stadium	9th
Myr Hornostayivka	Start Stadium, Novotroitske, Kherson Oblast	9th
FC Nikopol	Elektrometalurh Stadium	11th
Real Pharma Odesa	Ivan Stadium	5th
Sudnobudivnyk Mykolaiv	Central City Stadium	17th
Sudnobudivnyk Mykolaiv	Park Peremohy Stadium	17th
Sudnobudivnyk Mykolaiv	Mashynobudivnyk Stadium (Note: Round 26 game was played at Mashynobudivnyk Stadium, Beryslav)	17th
Tavriya Simferopol	Mashynobudivnyk Stadium	Am2, 9th
Tavriya Simferopol	Enerhiya Stadium (Note: Tavriya Simferopol play their home matches in Beryslav due to the Annexation of Crimea by the Russian Federation At the start of the season the stadium did not qualify for professional competitions and the club played their first few home matches at Enerhiya Stadium in Nova Kakhovka.)	Am2, 9th

== Managers ==
Club	Head coach	Replaced coach
Ahrobiznes Volochysk	(Ukraine) Andriy Donets	
Arsenal-Kyivshchyna Bila Tserkva	(Ukraine) Oleksandr Akimov	
Bukovyna Chernivtsi	(Ukraine) Viktor Mhlynets	(Ukraine) Yuriy Kraft (caretaker) (Ukraine) Vitaliy Kunytsia (caretaker)
FC Dnipro	(Ukraine) Oleksandr Poklonskyi	
SC Dnipro-1	(Ukraine) Dmytro Mykhaylenko	
Enerhiya Nova Kakhovka	(Ukraine) Oleh Fedorchuk	
Inhulets-2 Petrove	(Ukraine) Mykola Fedorko	(Ukraine) Eduard Pavlov (Ukraine) Serhiy Taran (caretaker) (Ukraine) Andriy Kononenko
FC Lviv	(Ukraine) Andriy Khanas	(Ukraine) Andriy Chikh
Metalist 1925 Kharkiv	(Ukraine) Serhiy Valyayev	(Ukraine) Oleksandr Pryzetko (Ukraine) Vyacheslav Khruslov (caretaker) (Ukraine) Oleksandr Ivanov (Ukraine) Serhiy Ralyuchenko (caretaker)
Metalurh Zaporizhzhia	(Ukraine) Viktor Zhuk (caretaker)	
MFC Mykolaiv-2	(Ukraine) Vyacheslav Mazarati	
Myr Hornostayivka	(Ukraine) Oleksandr Sapelnyak	(Ukraine) Viktor Bohatyr
FC Nikopol	(Ukraine) Hryhoriy Varzhelenko	
Nyva Ternopil	(Ukraine) Vitaliy Shumskyi	(Ukraine) Vadym Bozhenko (caretaker) (Ukraine) Serhiy Zadorozhnyi
Nyva-V Vinnytsia	(Ukraine) Denys Kolchin	(Ukraine) Volodymyr Horilyi
Podillya Khmelnytskyi	(Ukraine) Vitaliy Kostyshyn	(Ukraine) Arkadiy Batalov
Polissya Zhytomyr	(Ukraine) Oleksandr Pryzetko	(Ukraine) Ihor Levytskyi (Ukraine) Eduard Khavrov (Ukraine) Volodymyr Mazyar
Prykarpattia Ivano-Frankivsk	(Ukraine) Volodymyr Kovalyuk	
Real Pharma Odesa	(Ukraine) Andriy Kovalenko (interim)	
Skala Stryi	(Ukraine) Roman Hnativ	
Sudnobudivnyk Mykolaiv	(United States) Dennis Lukens	(Ukraine) Viktor Zhurov
Tavriya Simferopol	(Ukraine) Serhiy Shevchenko	
FC Ternopil	(Kazakhstan) Petro Badlo	

=== Managerial changes ===
Team	Outgoing head coach	Manner of departure	Date of vacancy	Table	Incoming head coach	Date of appointment	Table
Bukovyna Chernivtsi	(Ukraine) Oleh Ratiy	Resigned	4 June 2017	Pre-season	(Ukraine) Yuriy Kraft (caretaker) (Ukraine) Vitaliy Kunytsia (caretaker)	2 July 2017	Pre-season
FC Dnipro	(Ukraine) Dmytro Mykhaylenko	Resigned	21 June 2017	Pre-season	(Ukraine) Oleksandr Poklonskyi	21 June 2017	Pre-season
SC Dnipro-1	new club			Pre-season	(Ukraine) Dmytro Mykhaylenko	21 June 2017	Pre-season
Sudnobudivnyk Mykolaiv	(United States) Dennis Lukens	Change of contract	25 June 2017	Pre-season	(Ukraine) Viktor Zhurov	25 June 2017	Pre-season
MFC Mykolaiv-2	new club			Pre-season	(Ukraine) Vyacheslav Mazarati	26 June 2017	Pre-season
Sudnobudivnyk Mykolaiv	(Ukraine) Viktor Zhurov	Resigned	23 July 2017	10th	(United States) Dennis Lukens	23 July 2017	10th
Podillya Khmelnytskyi	(Ukraine) Arkadiy Batalov	Released	31 July 2017	8th	(Ukraine) Vitaliy Kostyshyn (interim)	31 July 2017	8th
Polissya Zhytomyr	(Ukraine) Ihor Levytskyi	Resigned	12 August 2017	11th	(Ukraine) Eduard Khavrov	28 August 2017	11th
Bukovyna Chernivtsi	(Ukraine) Yuriy Kraft (caretaker) (Ukraine) Vitaliy Kunytsia (caretaker)	End of interim term	25 August 2017	8th	(Ukraine) Viktor Mhlynets	25 August 2017	8th
Myr Hornostayivka	(Ukraine) Viktor Bohatyr	Mutual consent	29 August 2017	4th	(Ukraine) Oleksandr Sapelnyak (Note: Until 18 September 2018 Oleksandr Sapelnyak served as a caretaker.)	29 August 2017	4th
Inhulets-2 Petrove	(Ukraine) Andriy Kononenko	Fired	15 September 2017	11th	(Ukraine) Serhiy Taran (assistant head coach)	25 September 2017	11th
Nyva-V Vinnytsia	(Ukraine) Volodymyr Horilyi	Fired	18 September 2017	5th	(Ukraine) Denys Kolchin	22 September 2017	5th
Metalist 1925 Kharkiv	(Ukraine) Oleksandr Pryzetko	Mutual consent (Note: Initial reports were that Oleksandr Pryzetko resigned but later it was reported that he was dismissed without reason)	26 September 2017	1st	(Ukraine) Vyacheslav Khruslov (caretaker)	26 September 2017	1st
Metalist 1925 Kharkiv	(Ukraine) Vyacheslav Khruslov (caretaker)	End of interim spell	28 September 2017	1st	(Ukraine) Oleksandr Ivanov	28 September 2017	1st
Inhulets-2 Petrove	(Ukraine) Serhiy Taran	Interim	30 September 2017	11th	(Ukraine) Eduard Pavlov	30 September 2017	11th
Polissya Zhytomyr	(Ukraine) Eduard Khavrov	Sacked	20 November 2017	8th	(Ukraine) Volodymyr Mazyar	22 November 2017	8th
Inhulets-2 Petrove	(Ukraine) Eduard Pavlov	Undisclosed	15 December 2017	11th	(Ukraine) Mykola Fedorko	27 December 2017	11th
Polissya Zhytomyr	(Ukraine) Volodymyr Mazyar	Gentlemen's agreement	15 December 2017	8th	(Ukraine) Oleksandr Pryzetko	27 December 2017	8th
Nyva Ternopil	(Ukraine) Serhiy Zadorozhnyi	Fired	16 April 2018	5th	(Ukraine) Vadym Bozhenko (caretaker)	16 April 2018	5th
Metalist 1925 Kharkiv	(Ukraine) Oleksandr Ivanov	Resigned	3 May 2018	2nd	(Ukraine) Serhiy Ralyuchenko (caretaker)	3 May 2018	2nd
FC Lviv	(Ukraine) Andriy Chikh	Sacked	6 May 2018	4th	(Ukraine) Andriy Khanas (caretaker)	8 May 2018	4th
Metalist 1925 Kharkiv	(Ukraine) Serhiy Ralyuchenko (caretaker)	End of interim spell	8 May 2018	2nd	(Ukraine) Serhiy Valyayev	8 May 2018	2nd
Podillia Khmelnytskyi	(Ukraine) Vitaliy Kostyshyn (caretaker)	Made permanent	May 2018	9th	(Ukraine) Vitaliy Kostyshyn	May 2018	9th
Nyva Ternopil	(Ukraine) Vadym Bozhenko (caretaker)	Interim	28 May 2018	6th	(Ukraine) Vitaliy Shumskyi	28 May 2018	6th

== Group A ==
=== League table ===
Pos	Team	Pld	W	D	L	GF	GA	GD	Pts	Promotion, qualification or relegation
1	Ahrobiznes Volochysk (Note: On 7 April 2018 Ahrobiznes Volochysk secured its promotion to the First League with 8 rounds before the end of season.) (C, P)	27	23	1	3	70	19	+51	70	Promotion to Ukrainian First League
2	Prykarpattia Ivano-Frankivsk (Note: On 21 April 2018 Prykarpattia Ivano-Frankivsk secured its promotion to the First League with 6 rounds before the end of season.) (P)	27	20	2	5	58	28	+30	62	Promotion to Ukrainian First League
3	Nyva-V Vinnytsia	27	13	6	8	34	21	+13	45	
4	Skala Stryi	27	12	4	11	29	29	0	40	Withdrew after the season
5	FC Lviv (Note: After completing the season, FC Lviv was promoted to the Ukrainian Premier League on pretence of merging with Veres Rivne and made a swap of their league membership. On 5 June 2018 the club was admitted to the 2018–19 Ukrainian Premier League while Veres Rivne would be in the 2018–19 Ukrainian Second League competition. In addition, the club's female team was admitted to the Ukrainian Women's League without participating in competitions of the first league which was required for promotion.) (P)	27	10	6	11	28	29	−1	36	Promotion to Ukrainian Premier League
6	Bukovyna Chernivtsi	27	9	7	11	32	40	−8	34	
7	Nyva Ternopil (Note: After completing most of the season (23 games), Nyva Ternopil on 8 May 2018 the club informed the PFL that they are withdrawing from the competition due to the league's refereeing. However, after the Club's Directors met with PFL president Makarov it was announced that they will return to the competition, subsequently only missing one match against Podillya with technical defeat "-:+".)	27	9	6	12	25	29	−4	33	
8	Polissya Zhytomyr	27	9	3	15	31	44	−13	30	
9	Podillya Khmelnytskyi	27	6	4	17	20	44	−24	22	
10	Arsenal-Kyivshchyna Bila Tserkva (Note: Arsenal-Kyivshchyna Bila Tserkva – failed attestation for the next season and was removed from the league) (R)	27	4	1	22	18	62	−44	13	Withdrew after the season
-	FC Ternopil (Note: FC Ternopil after failing to arrive for their Round 6 away match against Polissya Zhytomyr, several days later informed the PFL that they are withdrawing from the competition. The club played four matches in the competition with a record of 4 losses scoring two goals and allowing nine goals scored against them. The PFL annulled their results as per league regulations and removed them from the official standings on the decision of the FFU Control and Disciplinary Committee of 7 September 2017.)	0	-	-	-	-	-	—	0	Results annulled

Updated to match(es) played on 2 June 2018. Source: PFL.ua
Rules for classification: 1) Points; 2) Goal difference; 3) Goals scored; 4) Head-to-head points; 5) Head-to-head goal difference; 6) Head-to-head goals scored; 7) Fair play; 8) Draw or play-off.
(C) Champions; (P) Promoted; (R) Relegated

=== Results ===
Due to withdrawal of FC Ternopil, after the first full round the season calendar for Group A was redrawn on 7 September.

Home \ Away	AHR	AKB	BUC	LVI	NVT	NYV	POK	PZH	PIF	SKS	AHR	AKB	BUC	LVI	NVT	NYV	POK	PZH	PIF	SKS
Ahrobiznes Volochysk			3–1	1–0	0–1	1–0	2–1					4–0	5–0	2–0	5–1	2–1	2–1	3–2	3–0	1–2
Arsenal-Kyivschyna Bila Tserkva	0–3 (Note: Arsenal-Kyivshchyna asked the PFL to postpone their Round 1 against match Polissya Zhytomyr and their Round 6 against FC Lviv due to the poor financial situation in the club and the lack of support from local and regional authorities. Initially, the club also informed the PFL that they will be withdrawing from the competition, but found support in nearby Obukhiv where they played their Round 10 home fixture. Fixtures were rescheduled after Round 17 and Round 19.)			0–1		0–1		2–3			0–5		2–2	3–0	0–2	2–3	2–1	0–4	1–4	0–1
Bukovyna Chernivtsi		4–0						2–1 (Note: Polissya Zhytomyr asked the PFL to postpone their Round 7 (20 August) away match against Bukovyna Chernivtsi due to financial hardship. Match rescheduled after Round 19.)	1–2	1–3 (Note: Round 2 was played without spectators as part of sanctions administered by the Control Disciplinary Committee of the Football Federation of Ukraine due to fan behavior during Bukovyna's home match last season against FC Poltava.)	1–2	3–1		0–0	1–0	3–0	1–0	2–0	1–0	0–3
FC Lviv			4–3		0–0	1–1	4–0			1–0	0–2	3–0	0–0		2–0	0–3	0–0	3–0 (Note: Polissya Zhytomyr was adjudged a technical loss against FC Lviv in the away game of Round 13 for fielding a disqualified player. The FFU Control and Disciplinary Committee annulled the original score of 3–3 with the 3–0 technical win for FC Lviv.)	1–3	1–1
Nyva Ternopil		2–0	0–0				3–2		0–1	2–0	1–2	1–2	0–0	1–2		1–0	2–0	2–1	3–3	0–1
Nyva-V Vinnytsia			1–1		1–1		0–0		0–0	1–1	2–0	1–0	0–1	1–2	1–0		1–0	2–1	0–1	3–1
Podillya Khmelnytskyi		1–0	0–0					0–2	1–3	0–2	0–4	2–0	3–0	2–0	+:- (Note: Nyva Ternopil did not arrive for their Round 25 match due to their announcement of leaving the PFL.)	1–4		2–3	0–3	1–0
Polissya Zhytomyr	0–5			0–3	3–0	0–4					0–0	2–0	2–1	2–0	0–2	0–2	0–0		2–0	0–1
Prykarpattia Ivano-Frankivsk	2–5	4–0		1–0				2–0			1–4	2–0	5–2	1–0	2–0	1–0	5–2	3–2		2–0
Skala Stryi	0–1	3–0 (Note: Arsenal-Kyivshchyna Bila Tserkva was awarded a technical loss against Skala Stryi due to their failure to appear at their Round 7 match, according to decision of the FFU Control and Disciplinary Committee of 14 September 2017.)						2–0	0–4		1–3	0–3	3–1	2–0	0–0	0–1	1–0	1–1	0–2	

Updated to match(es) played on 2 June 2018. Source: (in Ukrainian)
Legend: Blue = home team win; Yellow = draw; Red = away team win.

=== Position by round ===
Team ╲ Round	1	2	3	4	5	6	7	8	9	10	11	12	13	14	15	16	17	18	19	20	21	22	23	24	25	26	27	28	29
Ahrobiznes Volochysk	1	2	1	1	1	1	1	1	1	1	1	1	1	1	1	1	1	1	1	1	1	1	1	1	1	1	1	1	1
Prykarpattia Ivano-Frankivsk	10	6	4	4	3	2	2	2	2	2	2	2	2	2	2	2	2	2	2	2	2	2	2	2	2	2	2	2	2
Nyva-V Vinnytsia	4	3	5	5	5	5	5	5	6	6	5	5	5	5	4	4	4	4	5	5	4	3	3	3	3	3	3	3	3
Skala Stryi	2	1	3	3	2	3	3	3	3	5	6	6	6	6	7	7	7	7	6	6	8	8	7	8	7	4	4	4	4
FC Lviv	3	5	2	2	4	4	4	4	5	4	4	4	4	4	5	5	5	5	4	3	3	4	4	4	4	5	5	5	5
Bukovyna Chernivtsi	9	9	7	7	8	8	8	7	7	7	7	8	8	7	6	6	6	8	7	7	7	7	6	7	6	7	6	7	6
Nyva Ternopil	7	4	6	6	6	6	6	6	4	3	3	3	3	3	3	3	3	3	3	4	5	5	5	5	5	6	7	6	7
Polissya Zhytomyr	8	11	11	11	11	11	11	11	9	9	8	7	7	8	8	8	8	6	8	8	6	6	8	6	8	8	8	8	8
Podillya Khmelnytskyi	5	7	8	8	7	7	7	8	8	8	9	9	9	9	9	9	9	9	9	9	9	9	9	9	9	9	9	9	9
Arsenal-Kyivschyna Bila Tserkva	6	8	9	9	10	10	10	10	11	11	10	10	10	10	10	10	10	10	10	10	10	10	10	10	10	10	10	10	10
FC Ternopil	~~11~~	~~10~~	~~10~~	~~10~~	~~9~~	~~9~~	~~9~~	~~9~~	~~10~~	~~10~~																			

Updated to match(es) played on 2 June 2018. Source: pfl.ua

=== Top goalscorers ===
As of 2 June 2018

Rank	Scorer	Team	Goals (Pen.)
1	(Ukraine) Ihor Khudobyak	Prykarpattia Ivano-Frankivsk	19
1	(Ukraine) Bohdan Semenets	Ahrobiznes Volochysk	19 (2)
3	(Ukraine) Vitaliy Hrusha	Ahrobiznes Volochysk	15 (3)

== Group B ==
=== League table ===
Pos	Team	Pld	W	D	L	GF	GA	GD	Pts	Promotion, qualification or relegation
1	SC Dnipro-1 (Note: On 2 May 2018 SC Dnipro-1 secured its promotion to the First League with 5 rounds before the end of season.) (C, P)	33	26	3	4	87	15	+72	81	Promotion to Ukrainian First League
2	Metalist 1925 Kharkiv (Note: On 26 May 2018 Metalist 1925 Kharkiv secured its promotion to the First League with one round before the end of season.) (P)	33	21	4	8	77	27	+50	67	Promotion to Ukrainian First League
3	Enerhiya Nova Kakhovka	33	19	4	10	67	32	+35	61	
4	Tavriya Simferopol	33	18	7	8	59	33	+26	61	
5	Myr Hornostayivka	33	14	11	8	47	30	+17	53	
6	Real Pharma Odesa	33	15	7	11	54	40	+14	52	
7	FC Nikopol	33	11	12	10	36	34	+2	45	
8	FC Dnipro (R)	33	16	7	10	57	34	+23	37 (Note: FC Dnipro were deducted 18 points. Initially 3 points were deducted for failing to comply with a decision of the FIFA's Disciplinary Committee of 29 August 2017 Later on 16 January 2018, the PFL implemented FIFA's Disciplinary Committee findings which were originally informed to the FFU on 16 August 2017 about its decision to deduct the club 6 points. On 6 March 2018, Dnipro was deducted additional 9 points including 3 for breaking its contract with Egídio Pereira Júnior and 6 for other debts. On 2 May 2018 the President of Professional Football League Serhiy Makarov stated that he does not exclude a possibility of further relegation of Dnipro due to unpaid old debts.)	Relegation to Ukrainian Football Amateur League (Note: After completing the season, FC Dnipro failed attestation for the 2018–19 Ukrainian Second League season and were approved by the FIFA Disciplinary Committee to be relegated to a lower classification level due to unpaid old debts. There are speculations that the club will be dissolved. FC Dnipro tried, but failed attestation for the season and were approved by the FIFA Disciplinary Committee to be relegated to a lower classification level due to unpaid old debts)
9	MFC Mykolaiv-2	33	10	7	16	41	58	−17	37	
10	Inhulets-2 Petrove (Note: After completing the season, the administration of Inhulets Petrove decided to dissolve its reserve club Inhulets-2 Petrove citing that the club would concentrate their funds on the main club and infrastructure.)	33	4	7	22	29	70	−41	19	Withdrew after the season
11	Sudnobudivnyk Mykolaiv (Note: Sudnobudivnyk Mykolaiv – failed attestation for the next season and was removed from the league) (R)	33	5	4	24	33	95	−62	19	Withdrew after the season
12	Metalurh Zaporizhzhia (Note: After completing the season, Metalurh Zaporizhzhia intended to stay in the league for the next season, but they failed attestation for the 2018–19 Ukrainian Second League season and the club's administration decided to dissolve the team. Prior to attestation, the club merged with FC Spartak-KPU Zaporizhzhia (a team of local university, KPU), but on 6 June 2018, the club failed attestation for the season and the club's administration decided to dissolve the team)	33	2	1	30	14	133	−119	7 (Note: On 2 June 2018 Metalurh Zaporizhzhia, after losing their last game of the season away against Tavriya 0–9, established a new league record for goals conceded with 133 goals.)	Withdrew after the season

Updated to match(es) played on 2 June 2018. Source: PFL.ua
Rules for classification: 1) Points; 2) Goal difference; 3) Goals scored; 4) Head-to-head points; 5) Head-to-head goal difference; 6) Head-to-head goals scored; 7) Fair play; 8) Draw or play-off.
(C) Champions; (P) Promoted; (R) Relegated

=== Results ===
Home \ Away	DNI	DN1	ENK	IP2	M25	MZA	MK2	MYH	NIK	RPO	SBM	TAV	DNI	DN1	ENK	IP2	M25	MZA	MK2	MYH	NIK	RPO	SBM	TAV
Dnipro		2–0	2–2	2–0	2–3	5–0	1–0	1–1	2–0	3–1	5–0	1–0		1–2	0–1			2–1			1–1		2–0	1–2
SC Dnipro-1	0–0		2–0	3–0	1–0	3–0	3–0	0–1	2–1	4–1	3–0	4–0			1–0		1–0	3–0			1–0		8–0	4–2
Enerhiya Nova Kakhovka	1–2	0–1		2–0	1–2	2–0	3–2	2–3	2–0	2–0	1–0	2–2				2–1	1–0	7–0	0–1	2–0		1–1		
Inhulets-2 Petrove	3–3	0–5	1–3		0–0	6–1	0–0	1–0	1–1	1–1	0–0	0–2	1–3	0–6					0–1	1–1		0–1		
Metalist 1925 Kharkiv	1–0	1–1 (Note: Record attendance for a Second League match beating the 1993–94 Ukrainian Second League season high of 14,000 between Zirka-NIBAS and FC Borispil.)	4–1	2–1		4–0	0–1	0–0	4–0	5–0	5–1	3–2	3–0			4–0		3–0	4–0	1–4		1–1		
Metalurh Zaporizhya	0–5	0–8	0–11	2–1	0–5		2–3	2–0	0–4	0–2	0–5	0–1				2–4			0–8		0–4	0–4	1–2	
MFC Mykolaiv-2	2–4	0–3	1–4	1–0	2–6	3–0		0–0	0–0	0–3	4–1	1–2	1–2	0–5						0–0		1–1	3–1	
Myr Hornostayivka	0–0	1–4	1–1	4–0	2–1	3–0	1–0		2–0	2–4	1–2	0–0	3–1	1–1				3–1			0–0		5–0	0–1
Nikopol	0–0	2–0	1–0	2–0	0–4	1–0	3–0	0–0		0–0	2–2	1–1			1–2	2–1	1–0		2–2					0–0
Real Pharma Odesa	2–1	0–3	0–1	5–0	1–2	1–1	2–0	0–2	1–0		4–0	0–0	1–0	1–0						3–4	2–0		4–1	
Sudnobudivnyk Mykolaiv	0–2	0–3 (Note: The Round 4 fixture between Sudnobudivnyk and Dnipro-1 was abandoned after the first half due to inclement weather. Match completed 22 October after Round 18.)	1–5	4–2	0–1	3–1	2–2	0–1	0–2	1–6		0–0			1–3	1–2	1–5				2–4			0–4
Tavriya Simferopol	2–1	1–2	0–2 (Note: Tavriya played their Round 11 home match in Beryslav at the Mashynobudivnyk Stadium.)	3–2	0–3	8–0	1–2	1–0	1–1	3–1	4–2				1–0	1–0	2–0	9–0	2–0			1–0		

Updated to match(es) played on 2 June 2018. Source: (in Ukrainian)
Legend: Blue = home team win; Yellow = draw; Red = away team win.

=== Position by round ===
Team ╲ Round	1	2	3	4	5	6	7	8	9	10	11	12	13	14	15	16	17	18	19	20	21	22	23	24	25	26	27	28	29	30	31	32	33
SC Dnipro-1	5	1	1	3	2	4	4	2	2	2	2	4	3	3	2	3	2	2	2	2	1	1	1	1	1	1	1	1	1	1	1	1	1
Metalist 1925 Kharkiv	11	11	8	5	4	3	2	1	1	1	1	1	1	1	1	1	1	1	1	1	2	2	2	2	2	2	2	2	2	2	2	2	2
Enerhiya Nova Kakhovka	4	3	2	2	3	2	1	3	4	3	3	2	4	4	4	4	4	4	4	4	4	4	3	3	3	3	3	3	3	3	3	3	3
Tavriya Simferopol	2	2	4	6	5	6	5	6	6	6	7	7	7	7	8	7	7	7	6	6	6	6	4	4	4	4	4	4	4	4	4	4	4
Myr Hornostayivka	6	5	3	1	1	1	3	4	5	5	5	5	5	6	6	6	6	6	5	5	5	5	5	5	5	5	6	5	5	6	6	6	5
Real Pharma Odesa	3	4	7	9	7	5	7	8	7	7	6	6	6	5	5	5	5	5	7	7	7	7	6	6	6	6	5	6	6	5	5	5	6
Nikopol	7	7	10	7	8	7	8	7	8	8	8	8	8	8	7	8	8	8	8	8	8	8	7	7	7	7	7	7	7	7	7	7	7
Dnipro	9	9	6	4	6	8	6	5	3	4	4	3	2	2	3	2	3	3	3	3	3	3	8	8	8	8	8	8	9	9	9	9	8
MFC Mykolaiv-2	8	8	11	11	11	11	11	11	11	11	11	9	9	9	9	9	10	10	9	9	9	9	9	9	9	9	9	9	8	8	8	8	9
Inhulets-2 Petrove	1	6	5	8	9	9	9	10	9	10	10	11	11	11	11	11	11	11	11	11	11	11	11	11	11	11	11	11	11	11	11	10	10
Sudnobudivnyk Mykolaiv	10	10	9	10	10	10	10	9	10	9	9	10	10	10	10	10	9	9	10	10	10	10	10	10	10	10	10	10	10	10	10	11	11
Metalurh Zaporizhya	12	12	12	12	12	12	12	12	12	12	12	12	12	12	12	12	12	12	12	12	12	12	12	12	12	12	12	12	12	12	12	12	12

Updated to match(es) played on 2 June 2018. Source: pfl.ua

=== Top goalscorers ===
As of 2 June 2018

Rank	Scorer	Team	Goals (Pen.)
1	(Ukraine) Serhiy Davydov	Metalist 1925 Kharkiv	23 (1)
2	(Ukraine) Vadym Voronchenko	Tavriya Simferopol	18 (1)
3	(Ukraine) Ihor Kohut	SC Dnipro-1	15

== Championship game ==
On 1 December 2017, at a session of the PFL council of leagues a decision was made to conduct a Championship game between winners of Group A and Group B. The championship game was played as a single game held on a neutral field. Ahrobiznes won the Second League Group A and qualified for the Championship game on 12 May 2018. On the same day, Dnipro-1 secured the Group B champion title after a win over FC Nikopol.

9 June 2018
20:00 UTC+3

SC Dnipro-1	0–1	Ahrobiznes Volochysk
	Report	Semenets 34'

NSC Olimpiyskiy, (Note: The Championship match was originally scheduled to be played in Cherkasy at the Central Stadium, the game was transferred to Kyiv. The president of Professional Football League commented on the transfer at NV radio that one of the reasons that influence it was a recent fans violence in Cherkasy.) Kyiv
Attendance: 5,000
Referee: Dmytro Kryvushkin (Kharkiv)

Ahrobiznes Volochysk are crowned Champions of the Ukrainian Second League for the 2017–18 season

== Awards ==
=== Round awards ===
Round	Player			Coach		
Round	Player	Club	Reference	Coach	Club	Reference
Round 1	(Ukraine) Vitaliy Hrusha	Ahrobiznes Volochysk		(Ukraine) Andriy Donets'	Ahrobiznes Volochysk	
Round 2	(Ukraine) Volodymyr Hladkyi	Skala Stryi		(Ukraine) Roman Hnativ	Skala Stryi	
Round 3	(Ukraine) Serhiy Davydov	Metalist 1925 Kharkiv		(Ukraine) Dmytro Mykhaylenko	SC Dnipro-1	
Round 4	(Ukraine) Roman Voronin	FC Nikopol		(Ukraine) Oleh Fedorchuk	Enerhiya Nova Kakhovka	
Round 5	(Ukraine) Bohdan Semenets	Ahrobiznes Volochysk		(Ukraine) Andriy Donets'	Ahrobiznes Volochysk	
Round 6	(Ukraine) Serhiy Davydov	Metalist 1925 Kharkiv		(Ukraine) Hryhoriy Varzhelenko	FC Nikopol	
Round 7	(Ukraine) Oleksandr Snizhko	SC Dnipro-1		(Ukraine) Oleh Fedorchuk	Enerhiya Nova Kakhovka	
Round 8	(Ukraine) Ivan Mykhailenko	FC Dnipro		(Ukraine) Volodymyr Kovalyuk	Prykarpattia Ivano-Frankivsk	
Round 9	(Ukraine) Oleksiy Bondarenko	Real Pharma Odesa		(Ukraine) Oleksandr Pryzetko	Metalist 1925 Kharkiv	
Round 10	(Ukraine) Oleksandr Apanchuk	Nyva Ternopil		(Ukraine) Andriy Chikh	FC Lviv	
Round 11	(Ukraine) Viktor Korovikov	Polissya Zhytomyr		(Ukraine) Eduard Khavrov	Polissya Zhytomyr	
Round 12	(Ukraine) Ihor Khudobyak	Prykarpattia Ivano-Frankivsk		(Ukraine) Oleksandr Poklonskyi	FC Dnipro	
Round 13	(Ukraine) Artem Dovbyk	FC Dnipro		(Ukraine) Andriy Donets'	Ahrobiznes Volochysk	
Round 14	(Ukraine) Yevhen Hahulin	Sudnobudivnyk Mykolaiv		(Ukraine) Viktor Mhlynets	Bukovyna Chernivtsi	
Round 15	(Ukraine) Yevhen Nemtinov	Bukovyna Chernivtsi		(Ukraine) Oleh Fedorchuk	Enerhiya Nova Kakhovka	
Round 16	(Ukraine) Ihor Khudobyak	Prykarpattia Ivano-Frankivsk		(Ukraine) Oleksandr Poklonskyi	FC Dnipro	
Round 17	(Ukraine) Vitaliy Kolesnykov	Polissya Zhytomyr		(Ukraine) Dmytro Mykhaylenko	SC Dnipro-1	
Round 18	(Ukraine) Oleksandr Yurchak	Ahrobiznes Volochysk		(Ukraine) Vitaliy Kostyshyn	Podillya Khmelnytskyi	
Round 19	(Iran) Siavash Hagh Nazari	Skala Stryi		(Ukraine) Oleksandr Akimov	Arsenal-Kyivshchyna Bila Tserkva	
Round 20	(Ukraine) Roman Bochak	Enerhiya Nova Kakhovka		(Ukraine) Vyacheslav Mazarati	MFC Mykolaiv-2	
Round 21	(Ukraine) Vladyslav Supryaha	SC Dnipro-1		(Ukraine) Dmytro Mykhaylenko	SC Dnipro-1	
winter break
Round 22	(Ukraine) Vitaliy Hrusha	Ahrobiznes Volochysk		(Ukraine) Andriy Chikh	FC Lviv	
Round 21/24	(Ukraine) Vadym Shavrin	Polissya Zhytomyr		(Ukraine) Dmytro Mykhailenko	SC Dnipro-1	
Round 22/25	(Ukraine) Volodymyr Savoshko	Nyva-V Vinnytsia		(Ukraine) Roman Hnativ	Skala Stryi	
Round 23/26	(Ukraine) Ihor Khudobyak	Prykarpattia Ivano-Frankivsk		(Ukraine) Volodymyr Kovalyuk	Prykarpattia Ivano-Frankivsk	
Round 24/27	(Ukraine) Yaroslav Zakharchenko	Real Pharma Odesa		(Ukraine) Oleh Fedorchuk	Enerhiya Nova Kakhovka	
Round 25/28	(Ukraine) Yevhen Sokolan	Tavriya Simferopol		(Ukraine) Oleksandr Sapelnyak	Myr Hornostayivka	
Round 26/29	(Ukraine) Bohdan Semenets	Ahrobiznes Volochysk		(Ukraine) Serhiy Shevchenko	Tavriya Simferopol	
Round 27/30	(Ukraine) Andriy Porokhnya	Inhulets-2 Petrove		(Ukraine) Hryhoriy Varzhelenko	FC Nikopol	
Round 28/31	(Ukraine) Oleh Synytsia	Metalist 1925 Kharkiv		(Ukraine) Denys Kolchin	Nyva-V Vinnytsia	
Round 29/32	(Ukraine) Maksym Yermolenko	Metalist 1925 Kharkiv		(Ukraine) Oleh Fedorchuk	Enerhiya Nova Kakhovka	

=== The 2017 annual coaching laureates ===
The best coaches were identified by the All-Ukrainian Football Coaches Association.

1st place		2nd place		3rd place	
Coach	Team	Coach	Team	Coach	Team
Oleh Fedorchuk	Enerhiya Nova Kakhovka	Volodymyr Kovalyuk	Prykarpattia Ivano-Frankivsk	Dmytro Mykhailenko	SC Dnipro-1

=== Season awards ===
The laureates of the 2017–18 season were:

- Best player: (Ukraine) Ihor Khudobyak (Prykarpattia Ivano-Frankivsk)
- Best coach: (Ukraine) Dmytro Mykhaylenko (SC Dnipro-1)
- Top goalscorer: (Ukraine) Serhiy Davydov (Metalist 1925 Kharkiv)
- Fair Play award: Ahrobiznes Volochysk

== See also ==
- 2017–18 Ukrainian Premier League
- 2017–18 Ukrainian First League
- 2017–18 Ukrainian Cup
