= 2016–17 in Ukrainian football =

Football in Ukraine
- Season: 2016–17

Men's football
- Premier League: Shakhtar Donetsk
- League 1: Illichivets Mariupol
- League 2: Zhemchuzhyna Odesa
- Amateur League: Ahrobiznes Volochysk (2016–17); Balkany Zorya (2016)
- Cup: Shakhtar Donetsk
- Amateur Cup: Chaika Petropavlivska Borshchahivka
- Super Cup: Dynamo Kyiv

Women's football
- League High: Zhytlobud-2 Kharkiv
- League 1: Spartak Chernihiv (Group A); Zlahoda-Dnipro-1 (Group B)
- Women's Cup: Zhytlobud-1 Kharkiv

The 2016–17 season was the 26th season of competitive association football in Ukraine since dissolution of the Soviet Union.

== Men's club football ==
League	Promoted to league	Relegated from league
Premier League	Zirka Kropyvnytskyi	~~Metalist Kharkiv~~; ~~Hoverla Uzhhorod~~; ~~Metalurh Zaporizhzhia~~
League One	Kolos Kovalivka; Veres Rivne; Inhulets Petrove; Bukovyna Chernivtsi; Skala Stryi; Arsenal-Kyiv	~~Hirnyk Kryvyi Rih~~; ~~Dynamo-2 Kyiv~~; ~~Nyva Ternopil~~
League Two	Balkany Zorya; Rukh Vynnyky; Zhemchuzhyna Odesa; Inhulets-2 Petrove; Metalurh Zaporizhya; Nyva-V Vinnytsia; Podillya Khmelnytskyi; Sudnobudivnyk Mykolaiv; Teplovyk Ivano-Frankivsk; Illichivets-2 Mariupol	~~Barsa Sumy~~

Note: For all scratched clubs, see section Clubs removed for more details

=== Premier League ===
Pos	Team	Pld	W	D	L	GF	GA	GD	Pts	Qualification or relegation
1	Shakhtar Donetsk	22	19	3	0	47	14	+33	60	Qualification for the Championship round
2	Dynamo Kyiv	22	14	4	4	43	23	+20	46	Qualification for the Championship round
3	Zorya Luhansk	22	12	4	6	34	21	+13	40	Qualification for the Championship round
4	Olimpik Donetsk	22	9	7	6	28	30	−2	34	Qualification for the Championship round
5	FC Oleksandriya	22	9	6	7	37	28	+9	33	Qualification for the Championship round
6	Chornomorets Odesa	22	7	6	9	17	23	−6	27	Qualification for the Championship round
7	Vorskla Poltava	22	6	6	10	24	28	−4	24	Qualification for the Relegation round
8	Stal Kamianske	22	6	6	10	20	25	−5	24	Qualification for the Relegation round
9	Zirka Kropyvnytskyi	22	6	5	11	20	33	−13	23	Qualification for the Relegation round
10	Karpaty Lviv (Note: Karpaty Lviv was deducted six points according to a decision by FIFA Disciplinary Committee on 4 March 2016.)	22	4	7	11	21	30	−9	13	Qualification for the Relegation round
11	FC Dnipro (Note: FC Dnipro was deducted a total of 12 points (six points by the FIFA Disciplinary Committee for failing to clear their debts with former coach Juande Ramos and his assistants, and six points by the Ukrainian Premier League for failing to comply with the decision of FIFA Disciplinary Committee to pay debts to former player Danilo Sousa Campos).)	22	4	10	8	21	30	−9	10	Qualification for the Relegation round
12	Volyn Lutsk	22	2	4	16	13	40	−27	10	Qualification for the Relegation round

Source: UEFA, Ukrainian Premier League, Soccerway
Rules for classification: 1) Points; 2) Goal difference; 3) Goals scored; 4) Head-to-head points; 5) Head-to-head goal difference; 6) Head-to-head goals scored; 7) Draw.
Notes:

Pos	Team	Pld	W	D	L	GF	GA	GD	Pts	Qualification or relegation
1	Shakhtar Donetsk (C)	32	25	5	2	66	24	+42	80	Qualification for the Champions League group stage
2	Dynamo Kyiv	32	21	4	7	69	33	+36	67	Qualification for the Champions League third qualifying round
3	Zorya Luhansk	32	16	6	10	45	31	+14	54	Qualification for the Europa League group stage (Note: Since winners of 2016–17 Ukrainian Cup, Shakhtar Donetsk, qualified for European competition based on their league position, the spot awarded to the cup winner (Europa League group stage) was passed to the third-placed team and the spot for the third-placed team (Europa League third qualifying round) was passed to the fifth-placed team.)
4	Olimpik Donetsk	32	11	11	10	33	44	−11	44	Qualification for the Europa League third qualifying round
5	FC Oleksandriya	32	10	10	12	41	43	−2	40	Qualification for the Europa League third qualifying round
6	Chornomorets Odesa	32	10	8	14	25	37	−12	38	

Source: UEFA, Ukrainian Premier League, Soccerway
Rules for classification: 1) Points; 2) Goal difference; 3) Goals scored; 4) Head-to-head points; 5) Head-to-head goal difference; 6) Head-to-head goals scored; 7) Draw.
(C) Champions
Notes:

Pos	Team	Pld	W	D	L	GF	GA	GD	Pts	Qualification or relegation
7	Vorskla Poltava (Note: Vorskla Poltava was awarded the UPL Prestige Trophy for winning the consolation tournament.)	32	11	9	12	32	32	0	42	
8	Stal Kamianske	32	11	8	13	27	31	−4	41	
9	Zirka Kropyvnytskyi	32	9	7	16	29	43	−14	34	
10	Karpaty Lviv (Note: Karpaty Lviv was deducted six points according to a decision by FIFA Disciplinary Committee on 4 March 2016.)	32	9	9	14	35	41	−6	30	
11	FC Dnipro (Note: FC Dnipro was deducted a total of 24 points (six points by the FIFA Disciplinary Committee for failing to clear their debts with former coach Juande Ramos and his assistants, six points by the Ukrainian Premier League for failing to comply with the decision of FIFA Disciplinary Committee to pay debts to former player Danilo Sousa Campos, three more points by the FFU Control and Disciplinary Committee for failing execute one of the decisions of the committee, and 9 more points on 9 June 2017, after the end of the tournament.). On the decision of FIFA, FFU enforced relegation of FC Dnipro straight to the Second League, skipping the First League. In a near future FFU will adopt a decision which team will be replacing Dnipro in the First League.) (R)	32	8	13	11	31	40	−9	13	Relegation to Ukrainian Second League
12	Volyn Lutsk (Note: Volyn Lutsk was deducted six points on the request of Football Federation of Ukraine which received a letter from the FIFA Disciplinary Committee on 11 May 2017 urging to implement its decision of 15 March 2017, due to debts with former player Saša Stević.) (R)	32	4	4	24	17	51	−34	10	Relegation to Ukrainian First League

Source: UEFA, Ukrainian Premier League, Soccerway
Rules for classification: 1) Points; 2) Goal difference; 3) Goals scored; 4) Head-to-head points; 5) Head-to-head goal difference; 6) Head-to-head goals scored; 7) Draw.
(R) Relegated

=== League 1 ===
Pos	Team	Pld	W	D	L	GF	GA	GD	Pts	Promotion, qualification or relegation
1	Illichivets Mariupol (C, P)	34	25	6	3	61	21	+40	81	Promotion to Ukrainian Premier League
2	Desna Chernihiv (Note: The Ukrainian Premier League did not grant Desna Chernihiv a licence to participate in the league, indicating that the club is not able to guarantee for an adequate financing of their infrastructure.)	34	22	8	4	55	23	+32	74	
3	Veres Rivne (P)	34	20	7	7	62	32	+30	67	Promotion to Ukrainian Premier League
4	Helios Kharkiv	34	16	10	8	31	22	+9	58	
5	Kolos Kovalivka	34	16	9	9	52	38	+14	57	
6	Naftovyk-Ukrnafta Okhtyrka	34	15	9	10	47	29	+18	54	
7	Avanhard Kramatorsk	34	14	10	10	32	28	+4	52	
8	Cherkaskyi Dnipro	34	12	12	10	30	29	+1	48	
9	Obolon-Brovar Kyiv	34	12	9	13	37	37	0	45	
10	Arsenal Kyiv	34	12	9	13	38	39	−1	45	
11	Hirnyk-Sport Horishni Plavni	34	12	7	15	47	54	−7	43	
12	FC Poltava (Note: On 12 January 2017, FC Poltava were deducted a total of 3 points in accordance with the FFU Control and Disciplinary Committee.)	34	13	4	17	33	43	−10	40	
13	Inhulets Petrove	34	10	8	16	33	45	−12	38	
14	MFC Mykolaiv	34	11	4	19	35	44	−9	37	
15	PFC Sumy (O)	34	8	12	14	34	44	−10	36	Qualification to relegation play-offs
16	Bukovyna Chernivtsi (R)	34	8	9	17	27	40	−13	33	Relegation to Ukrainian Second League
17	Skala Stryi (R)	34	5	5	24	25	58	−33	20	Relegation to Ukrainian Second League
18	FC Ternopil (R)	34	3	6	25	17	70	−53	15	Relegation to Ukrainian Second League

Source: PFL.ua
Rules for classification: 1) Points; 2) Goal difference; 3) Goals scored; 4) Head-to-head points; 5) Head-to-head goal difference; 6) Head-to-head away goals scored; 7) Draw or "golden match" (if tied for first).
(C) Champions; (O) Play-off winners; (P) Promoted; (R) Relegated
Notes:

Team 1	Agg.	Team 2	1st leg	2nd leg
PFC Sumy	3–1	FC Balkany Zorya	2–0	1–1

=== League 2 ===
Pos	Team	Pld	W	D	L	GF	GA	GD	Pts	Promotion, qualification or relegation
1	Zhemchuzhyna Odesa (C, P)	32	24	4	4	75	22	+53	76	Promotion to Ukrainian First League
2	Rukh Vynnyky (P)	32	23	5	4	68	24	+44	74	Promotion to Ukrainian First League
3	Kremin Kremenchuk (P)	32	21	5	6	67	29	+38	68	Promotion to Ukrainian First League
4	Balkany Zorya (P)	32	16	9	7	54	32	+22	57	Qualification to promotion play-offs
5	Real Pharma Odesa	32	16	9	7	50	31	+19	57	
6	Inhulets-2 Petrove (Note: Ineligible for promotion.)	32	14	8	10	50	33	+17	50	
7	Nyva-V Vinnytsia	32	14	8	10	42	33	+9	50	
8	Enerhiya Nova Kakhovka	32	14	6	12	62	46	+16	48	
9	Myr Hornostayivka	32	13	9	10	39	31	+8	48	
10	Teplovyk-Prykarpattia Ivano-Frankivsk (Note: During the winter break the club renamed themselves from Teplovyk Ivano-Frankivsk to Teplovyk-Prykarpattia Ivano-Frankivsk.)	32	14	4	14	51	35	+16	46	
11	FC Nikopol (Note: During the winter break the club renamed themselves from FC Nikopol-NPHU to FC Nikopol.)	32	12	5	15	40	49	−9	41	
12	Illichivets-2 Mariupol (Note: FC Illichivets announced that their second team, Illichivets-2, will not complete in the 2017–18 Ukrainian Second League, instead they will play in the Ukrainian Premier League Reserves competition.)	32	11	1	20	42	56	−14	34	Withdrawn after the season
13	Krystal Kherson (Note: On 30 March 2017, Krystal Kherson informed the PFL that they are withdrawing from the competition due to the club's economic and political situation. On 10 April 2017, the FFU formally expelled the club, and awarded technical victories to their opponents.) (D)	32	7	5	20	31	24	+7	26	Withdrawn during the season
14	Podillya Khmelnytskyi	32	7	4	21	29	68	−39	25	
15	Arsenal-Kyivshchyna Bila Tserkva	32	7	4	21	29	82	−53	25	
16	Metalurh Zaporizhzhia	32	7	2	23	35	104	−69	23	
17	Sudnobudivnyk Mykolaiv	32	6	4	22	19	84	−65	22	

Source: PFL.ua
Rules for classification: 1) Points; 2) Goal difference; 3) Goals scored; 4) Head-to-head points; 5) Head-to-head goal difference; 6) Head-to-head away goals scored; 7) Fair play; 8) Draw or play-off.
(C) Champions; (D) Disqualified; (P) Promoted

=== Cup competitions ===
==== Ukrainian Cup ====
17 May 2017
21:00

Shakhtar Donetsk	1–0	Dynamo Kyiv
Marlos 81'	Report

Metalist Stadium, Kharkiv
Attendance: 25,000
Referee: Kostiantyn Trukhanov

==== Super Cup ====
16 July 2016

Dynamo Kyiv	1–1	Shakhtar Donetsk
Vida 80'	Report	Fred 58'
Penalties
Antunes (penalty scored); Morozyuk (penalty scored); Harmash (penalty missed); Khacheridi (penalty scored); Moraes (penalty scored)	4–3	(penalty scored) Srna; (penalty missed) Bernard; (penalty scored) Ismaily; (penalty scored) Fred; (penalty missed) Seleznyov

Chornomorets Stadium, Odesa
Attendance: 26,109
Referee: Anatoliy Abdula

== Women's club football ==
League	Promoted to league	Relegated from league
Higher League	Voskhod Stara Maiachka	~~Lehenda-ShVSM Chernihiv~~; Ateks SDIuShOR-16 Kyiv

Note: For all scratched clubs, see section Clubs removed for more details

=== Higher League ===
2016–17 Vyshcha Liha (women)

== Clubs removed ==
=== Before the season ===
- Stal Kamianske, 12th place of the 2017–18 Ukrainian Premier League, was originally relegated, but later withdraw from the First League. The same day the PFL president confirmed that the league will consist of 16 teams. Originally, FC Stal Kamianske that were located in Kamianske played its games of the 2017–18 Ukrainian Premier League season in Kyiv. After relegation the club was admitted to the First League representing Bucha, Kyiv Oblast. Prior to the season commencing the club was renamed to FC Feniks Bucha.
- Naftovyk-Ukrnafta Okhtyrka, the Professional Football League allowed the club to keep its berth in the second tier even after its main sponsor announced that it will discontinue to fund the club. After the season completed, Ukrnafta (related to the Privat Group) who sponsored Naftovyk-Ukrnafta Okhtyrka decided to liquidate the club since it was a tax liability.
- Zhemchuzhyna Odesa withdrew after Round 31 during 2017–18 season. Technical losses were adjudged against the team in the last three matches. At time of withdrawal, Zhemchuzhyna's had played 31 matches, with a record of 7 wins, 6 draws and 18 losses, scoring 33 goals and having conceded 54 goals.
- Arsenal-Kyivshchyna Bila Tserkva failed attestation for the season and was removed from the league
- FC Ternopil after failing to arrive for their Round 6 away match against Polissya Zhytomyr, several days later informed the PFL that they are withdrawing from the competition. The club played four matches in the competition with a record of 4 losses scoring two goals and allowing nine goals scored against them. The PFL annulled their results as per league regulations and removed them from the official standings on the decision of the FFU Control and Disciplinary Committee of 7 September 2017.
- FC Metalurh Zaporizhzhia – prior to attestation, the club merged with FC Spartak-KPU Zaporizhzhia (a team of local university, KPU), but on 6 June 2018, the club failed attestation for the season and the club's administration decided to dissolve the team
- Inhulets-2 Petrove – the main club's administration of Inhulets Petrove decided to dissolve the second team
- Sudnobudivnyk Mykolaiv – failed attestation
- Skala Stryi – passed attestation, but dissolved its senior team protesting the FFU accusations in gambling. On 14 June 2018, there appeared information that the club will merge its academy with FC Volyn Lutsk.

=== During or after the season ===
- Arsenal–Kyiv withdrew from professional competitions after being relegated from the Premier League.
- PFC Sumy received new ownership during winter break in the face of Serhiy Vashchenko who earlier this season was supposed to become the owner of Kobra Kharkiv. The new head coach of the Sumy club who had been announced was also former head coach of Kobra, Oleksandr Oliynyk. At the same time according to the former club's director Anatoliy Boiko, on 1 December 2018 PFC Sumy did not have any players on contract. On 11 April 2019, the FFU Control and Disciplinary Committee adopted its decision to strip the club of professional status and exclude the club from any competitions that it is participating currently or in the future. However the club has a right to file an appeal. Additional separate sanctions were to be also applied against the club's playing and administrative personnel. On 14 April 2019, the chairman of the FFU committee of ethics and fair play Francesco Baranka noted in regards to additional sanctions that PFC Sumy has earned some 10 million euros in match fixing. More to it, Ukrainian coach Oleksandr Sevidov who held post of head coach consultant in PFC Sumy and previously managed FC Illichivets Mariupol received a lifetime disqualification.
- On 17 February 2019, president of FC Zirka Kropyvnytskyi commented on his club's withdrawal from further participation in competitions of the Ukrainian First League. The president accused the newly formed NABU and law enforcement authorities in pressure against him. The president of the league expressed his surprise claiming that there seemed no real reason why the club had to withdraw. On 5 April 2019, the PFL council of leagues adopted its decision to remove FC Zirka Kropyvnytskyi from the League as it officially withdrew on 14 March 2019. On 22 April 2019, the club's vice-president announced that the club will restart from regional competitions with intention to return the club's pro-status in the future.
- Helios Kharkiv, the club reorganized under new management under a new name as FC Kobra Kharkiv. The club merged with another amateur club called the Kobra Football Academy which was playing in the Kharkiv Oblast Football Championship. On 15 August 2018 the club informed the Professional Football League of Ukraine about withdrawal from professional competitions, and were later officially expelled from the league.
- FC Myr Hornostayivka withdrew from competitions in protest.
- Zlahoda-Dnipro-1 (dissolved)
- WFC Lviv (dissolved)
