= 2016 Ukrainian Football Amateur League =

Ukrainian Football Amateur League
- Season: 2016
- Dates: 16 April 2016 – 8 July 2016
- Champions: Balkany Zorya (2nd title) Ahrobiznes Volochysk (losing finalist)
- Promoted: 8 – Balkany, Nyva-V, Podillya, Zhemchuzhyna, Teplovyk, Sudnobudivnyk, Inhulets-2, Metalurh
- Relegated: 5 teams (withdrawn)

The 2016 Ukrainian Football Amateur League season was the 20th since it replaced the competition of physical culture clubs. It started on 16 April 2016.

There were 24 teams competing during the season which consisted of two phases, the first phase was a group stage with six groups of four teams and the second phase was a final playoff stage. All group winners and two best second placed teams advanced to playoffs which started from quarterfinals.

The last season winner Balkany Zorya were the defending champions.

== Teams ==
- Newly admitted former professional clubs: Kryvbas Kryvyi Rih (1957 as Dzerzhynsky Mine Administration), Metalurh Zaporizhia (1952)
  - These clubs last played at an amateur level when the Football Championship of the Ukrainian SSR was held among manufacturing teams before 1959. In 2017, MFC Zhytomyr adopted the heritage of Polissya Zhytomyr, which also last played at an amateur level in 1958 as Avanhard.

=== Returning/reformed clubs ===
- Nyva Ternopil (returning, last played season in 1982 as Nyva Berezhany)
- Teplovyk Ivano-Frankivsk (returning, last played season in 2003)
- Nyva-V Vinnytsia (returning, last played season in 2006 as Nyva-Svitanok)
- Kolos Khlibodarivka (returning, last played season in 2013)
- Podillya Khmelnytskyi (returning, last played season in 2014)

=== Debut ===
List of teams that are debuting this season in the league.

- Ahrobiznes Volochysk
- FC Lutsk
- FC Vradiyivka
- Chaika Petropavlivska-Borshchahivka
- FC Malynsk
- MFC Zhytomyr
- Hirnyk Sosnivka
- Sudnobudivnyk Mykolaiv
- Inhulets-2 Petrove
- FC Voloka

=== Withdrawn ===
List of clubs that took part in last year competition, but chose not to participate in 2016 season.

- Kolos Zachepylivka
- VPK-Ahro Shevchenkivka
- Mal Korosten
- Opir Lviv
- Rukh Vynnyky

=== Locations ===
Location of participating teams of the 2016 Ukrainian amateur championship

== First stage ==
As of 6 June 2016

=== Group 1 ===
Pos	Team	Pld	W	D	L	GF	GA	GD	Pts	Qualification
1	FC Malynsk (Q)	6	4	1	1	13	8	+5	13	Qualification to play-offs
2	Hirnyk Sosnivka	6	3	2	1	12	4	+8	11	
3	MFC Zhytomyr	6	3	1	2	6	5	+1	10	
4	FC Lutsk	6	0	0	6	4	18	−14	0	

(Q) Qualified for the phase indicated

==== Top goalscorers ====
Rank	Player	Club	Goals (Pen.)
1	(Ukraine) Roman Husak	MFC Zhytomyr	4
2	(Ukraine) Vitaliy Bryksa	FC Malynsk	3
2	(Ukraine) Mykola Bui	Hirnyk Sosnivka	3

=== Group 2 ===
Pos	Team	Pld	W	D	L	GF	GA	GD	Pts	Qualification
1	ODEK Orzhiv (Q)	6	5	1	0	18	1	+17	16	Qualification to play-offs
2	Nyva-V Vinnytsia (P)	6	2	2	2	5	5	0	8	Admission to Second League
3	FC Voloka	6	2	0	4	4	10	−6	6	
4	Podillya Khmelnytskyi (P)	6	1	1	4	4	15	−11	4	Admission to Second League

(P) Promoted; (Q) Qualified for the phase indicated

Notes:

- Game ODEK-Voloka failed to take place, ODEK was awarded technical victory (3:0).

==== Top goalscorers ====
Rank	Player	Club	Goals (Pen.)
1	(Ukraine) Viktor Hazytskyi	ODEK Orzhiv	4
1	(Ukraine) Vitaliy Hrusha	ODEK Orzhiv	4
3	(Ukraine) Yan Morhovskyi	Podillya Khmelnytskyi	3

=== Group 3 ===
Pos	Team	Pld	W	D	L	GF	GA	GD	Pts	Qualification
1	Ahrobiznes Volochysk (Q)	6	3	2	1	10	3	+7	11	Qualification to play-offs
2	Nyva Ternopil	6	1	4	1	4	3	+1	7	
3	FC Vinnytsia	6	1	3	2	4	7	−3	6	
4	Teplovyk Ivano-Frankivsk (P)	6	1	3	2	7	12	−5	6	Admission to Second League

(P) Promoted; (Q) Qualified for the phase indicated

==== Top goalscorers ====
Rank	Player	Club	Goals (Pen.)
1	(Ukraine) Andriy Donets	Ahrobiznes Volochysk	5
2	(Ukraine) Bohdan Orynchak	Teplovyk Ivano-Frankivsk	3

=== Group 4 ===
Pos	Team	Pld	W	D	L	GF	GA	GD	Pts	Qualification
1	Yednist Plysky (Q)	6	4	1	1	14	6	+8	13	Qualification to play-offs
2	Zhemchuzhyna Odesa (Q)	6	4	1	1	12	8	+4	13	Qualification to play-offs
3	Chaika Kyiv-Sviatoshyn Raion	6	1	2	3	5	10	−5	5	
4	Sudnobudivnyk Mykolaiv (P)	6	0	2	4	3	10	−7	2	Admission to Second League

(P) Promoted; (Q) Qualified for the phase indicated

==== Top goalscorers ====
Rank	Player	Club	Goals (Pen.)
1	(Ukraine) Oleksandr Petruk	Yednist Plysky	6
2	(Ukraine) Ruslan Palamar	Zhemchuzhyna Odesa	4

=== Group 5 ===
Pos	Team	Pld	W	D	L	GF	GA	GD	Pts	Qualification
1	Tavriya-Skif Rozdol (Q)	6	5	0	1	10	3	+7	15	Qualification to play-offs
2	FC Vradiyivka (Q)	6	4	1	1	11	5	+6	13	Qualification to play-offs
3	Inhulets-2 Petrove (P)	6	1	1	4	4	11	−7	4	Admission to the Second League
4	Avanhard Kakhovka	6	1	0	5	4	10	−6	3	

(P) Promoted; (Q) Qualified for the phase indicated

Notes:

- Game Avanhard-Inhulets-2 failed to take place, Avanhard was awarded technical victory (3:0).

==== Top goalscorers ====
Rank	Player	Club	Goals (Pen.)
1	(Ukraine) Oleh Kramarenko	FC Vradiyivka	3
1	(Ukraine) Ihor Dudnyk	Tavria-Skif Rozdol	3

=== Group 6 ===
Pos	Team	Pld	W	D	L	GF	GA	GD	Pts	Qualification
1	Balkany Zorya (C, Q)	6	5	0	1	19	6	+13	15	Champion; Qualification to play-offs
2	Kolos Khlibodarivka	6	3	1	2	14	9	+5	10	
3	Metalurh Zaporizhia (P)	6	2	2	2	5	6	−1	8	Admission to the Second League
4	Kryvbas Kryvyi Rih	6	0	1	5	2	19	−17	1	

(C) Champions; (P) Promoted; (Q) Qualified for the phase indicated

==== Top goalscorers ====
Rank	Player	Club	Goals (Pen.)
1	(Ukraine) Serhiy Platunov	Balkany Zorya	4
1	(Ukraine) Mykola Zlatov	Balkany Zorya	4
3	(Ukraine) Kyrylo Kyryk	Kolos Khlibodarivka	3

== Playoffs ==
=== Teams qualified ===
Balkany Zorya (21 May), Yednist Plysky (28 May), Tavria-Skif Rozdol (28 May), FC Malynsk (29 May), ODEK Orzhiv (29 May), Ahrobiznes Volochysk (29 May), Zhemchuzhyna Odesa (29 May), FC Vradiyivka (29 May)

=== Bracket ===
Quarter-finals
FC Malynsk	1	1	2
Ahrobiznes Volochysk	4	0	4
ODEK Orzhiv	1	2	3
Yednist Plysky	0	2	2
Zhemchuzhyna Odesa	1	0	1
FC Vradiyivka (a)	1	0	1
Tavria-Skif Rozdol	0	1	1
Balkany Zorya	0	4	4

Semi-finals
ODEK Orzhiv	0	0	0
Ahrobiznes Volochysk	1	2	3
Balkany Zorya	1	2	3
FC Vradiyivka	1	0	1

Final
8 July – Uman
Balkany Zorya (a.e.t.)	1
Ahrobiznes Volochysk	0

=== Quarterfinals ===
The stage draw took place on 6 June 2016 in the FFU House of Football. Games were played on 11/12 and 15/18 June 2016.

Team 1	Agg.	Team 2	1st leg	2nd leg
FC Malynsk	2–4	Ahrobiznes Volochysk	1–4	1–0
ODEK Orzhiv	3–2	Yednist Plysky	1–0	2–2
Zhemchuzhyna Odesa	1–1 (a)	FC Vradiyivka	1–1	0–0
Tavria-Skif Rozdol	1–4	Balkany Zorya	0–0	1–4

11 June 2016	Tavria-Skif Rozdol	0–0	Balkany Zorya	Rozdol, Zaporizhia Oblast
17:00 LST		[ Report]		Stadium: Tavria-Skif; Attendance: 400

11 June 2016	Zhemchuzhyna Odesa	1–1	Vradiivka	Odesa
18:00 LST	Palamar 35'	[ Report]	Zyma 69'	Stadium: Spartak; Attendance: 300

12 June 2016	FC Malynsk	1–4	Ahrobiznes Volochysk	Malynsk, Rivne Oblast
17:00 LST	Bryksa 58'	[ Report]	Plis 15'; Temnyuk 57', 90+4'; Donets 80'	Stadium: Lion; Attendance: 400

12 June 2016	ODEK Orzhiv	1–0	Yednist Plysky	Orzhiv, Rivne Oblast
17:00 LST	Naumets 12'	[ Report]		Stadium: ODEK; Attendance: 600

15 June 2016	Vradiivka	0–0	Zhemchuzhyna Odesa	Vradiivka, Mykolaiv Oblast
17:30 LST		[ Report]		Stadium: Vradiivka; Attendance: 300

18 June 2016	Yednist Plysky	2–2	ODEK Orzhiv	Plysky, Chernihiv Oblast
17:00 LST	Petruk 14'; Postolatiev 45'	[ Report]	Hrusha 72'; Karashchenko 80'	Stadium: Yednist; Attendance: 300

18 June 2016	Balkany Zorya	4–1	Tavria-Skif Rozdol	Zorya, Odesa Oblast
17:00 LST	Ursulenko 4'; V.Kyrylov 32'; Salamakha 37'; Oprya 62'	[ Report]	Porublyov (penalty missed) 15'; Skorokhodov 54'	Stadium: imeni Tropantsia; Attendance: 1,000

18 June 2016	Ahrobiznes Volochysk	0–1	FC Malynsk	Volochysk, Khmelnytskyi Oblast
18:00 LST		[ Report]	Onishchuk 78'	Stadium: Yunist; Attendance: 400

=== Semifinals ===
Games were played on 25/26 June and 2/3 July 2016. The draw took place on 20 June 2016 in the House of Football.

Team 1	Agg.	Team 2	1st leg	2nd leg
ODEK Orzhiv	0–3	Ahrobiznes Volochysk	0–1	0–2
Balkany Zorya	3–1	FC Vradiyivka	1–1	2–0

26 June 2016	ODEK Orzhiv	0–1	Ahrobiznes Volochysk	Orzhiv, Rivne Oblast
18:00 LST		[ Report]	Temnyuk 25'	Stadium: ODEK; Attendance: 500

26 June 2016	Balkany Zorya	1–1	FC Vradiyivka	Zorya, Odesa Oblast
18:30 LST	Platunov 85' (pen.)	[ Report]	Kramarenko 45'	Stadium: imeni Tropantsia; Attendance: 450

2 July 2016	Ahrobiznes Volochysk	2–0	ODEK Orzhiv	Volochysk, Khmelnytskyi Oblast
18:30 LST	Atlasyuk 6'; Temnyuk 81'	[ Report]		Stadium: Yunist; Attendance: 1,000

2 July 2016	FC Vradiyivka	0–2	Balkany Zorya	Vradiivka, Mykolaiv Oblast
18:00 LST		[ Report]	V.Zlatov 7'; V.Kyrylov 69'	Stadium: Vradiyivka; Attendance: 400

=== Championship final ===
8 July 2016	Balkany Zorya	1–0 (a.e.t.)	Ahrobiznes Volochysk	Uman, Cherkasy Oblast
18:00 LST	Raichev 104'	Report		Stadium: Tsentralnyi Stadion; Attendance: 3,000; Referee: V.Dorosh (Kyiv)

==== Top goalscorers ====
Rank	Player	Club	Goals (Pen.)
1	(Ukraine) Mykola Temnyuk	FC Ahrobiznes Volochysk	4
2	(Ukraine) V.Kyrylov	FC Balkany Zorya	2

== Promotion ==
On 2 June 2016, FFU issued professional licenses to most of clubs of the Professional Football League of Ukraine, while some clubs were given additional time to apply. Among the clubs that received licenses were five former amateur clubs. Following amateur teams were awarded professional licenses for the 2016–17 Ukrainian Second League: FC Balkany Zorya, FC Nyva-V Vinnytsia, FC Podillya Khmelnytskyi, FC Rukh Vynnyky, and FC Zhemchuzhyna Odesa. On 17 June 2016, the Professional Football League of Ukraine (PFL) announced that FC Metalurh Zaporizhia also was allowed to compete at the Second League. After the PFL Conference on 24 June 2016, the Second League might be also able to accept FC Illichivets-2 Mariupol and FC Inhulets-2 Petrove. On 15 June 2016, three more clubs were given extension by the FFU Executive Committee to apply for professional licenses, among which are FC Sudnobudivnyk Mykolaiv, FC Teplovyk Ivano-Frankivsk, and FC Lutsk.

== Number of teams by region ==
Number	Region	Team(s)
2	Kherson Oblast	Avanhard Kakhovka, Kolos Khlibodarivka
2	Khmelnytskyi Oblast	Ahrobiznes Volochysk, Podillia Khmelnytskyi
2	Mykolaiv Oblast	Sudnobudivnyk Mykolaiv, FC Vradiivka
2	Odesa Oblast	Balkany Zorya, Zhemchuzhyna Odesa
2	Rivne Oblast	FC Malynsk, ODEK Orzhiv
2	Vinnytsia Oblast	Nyva-V Vinnytsia, FC Vinnytsia
2	Zaporizhia Oblast	Metalurh Zaporizhia, Tavria-Skif Rozdol
1	Chernihiv Oblast	Yednist Plysky
1	Chernivtsi Oblast	FC Voloka
1	Dnipropetrovsk Oblast	Kryvbas Kryvyi Rih
1	Ivano-Frankivsk Oblast	Teplovyk Ivano-Frankivsk
1	Kirovohrad Oblast	Inhulets-2 Petrove
1	Kyiv Oblast	Chaika Petropavlivska Borshchahivka
1	Lviv Oblast	Hirnyk Sosnivka
1	Ternopil Oblast	Nyva Ternopil
1	Volyn Oblast	FC Lutsk
1	Zhytomyr Oblast	MFC Zhytomyr
