= Yevhen Zaporozhets =

Ukrainian footballer (born 1994)

Personal information
- Full name: Yevhen Dmytrovych Zaporozhets
- Date of birth: 20 September 1994 (age 32)
- Place of birth: Dnipropetrovsk, Ukraine
- Height: 1.82 m (6 ft 0 in)
- Position: Midfielder

Team information
- Current team: Epitsentr Kamianets-Podilskyi
- Number: 5

Youth career
- 2008–2011: ISTA Dnipropetrovsk

Senior career*
Years	Team	Apps	(Gls)
2013–2014	Dnipropetrovsk	0	(0)
2014–2023	Inhulets Petrove	238	(7)
2015	→ Inhulets-3 Petrove	5	(2)
2017	→ Inhulets-2 Petrove	1	(0)
2024	Obolon Kyiv	4	(0)
2024–	Epitsentr Kamianets-Podilskyi	50	(1)
- * Club domestic league appearances and goals as of 3 June 2026

Yevhen Dmytrovych Zaporozhets (Ukrainian: Євген Дмитрович Запорожець; born 20 September 1994) is a Ukrainian professional footballer who plays as a midfielder for Epitsentr Kamianets-Podilskyi.

== Club career ==
He is a product of the youth system of ISTA from Dnipro. Zaporozhets made his debut for Dnipropetrovsk at regional competitions in Dnipropetrovsk Oblast in 2013. In 2014 he joined AF Pyatykhatska Volodymyrivka which later became Inhulets Petrove.

== Career statistics ==
As of match played 7 November 2021

Appearances and goals by club, season and competition
Club	Season	League			Cup		Continental		Other		Total	
Club	Season	Division	Apps	Goals	Apps	Goals	Apps	Goals	Apps	Goals	Apps	Goals
Inhulets Petrove	2014	Ukrainian Football Amateur League	10	1	9	0	0	0	5	0	23	1
Inhulets Petrove	2015	Ukrainian Football Amateur League	9	0	0	0	0	0	0	0	9	0
Inhulets Petrove	2015–16	Ukrainian Second League	23	1	0	0	0	0	0	0	23	1
Inhulets Petrove	2016–17	Ukrainian First League	30	1	0	0	0	0	0	0	30	1
Inhulets Petrove	2017–18	Ukrainian First League	31	2	0	0	0	0	0	0	31	2
Inhulets Petrove	2018–19	Ukrainian First League	25	0	3	1	0	0	0	0	28	1
Inhulets Petrove	2019–20	Ukrainian First League	28	1	3	0	0	0	0	0	31	1
Inhulets Petrove	2020–21	Ukrainian Premier League	24	0	1	0	0	0	0	0	25	0
Inhulets Petrove	2021–22	Ukrainian Premier League	13	0	0	0	0	0	0	0	13	0
Inhulets Petrove	Total		193	6	16	1	0	0	5	0	214	7
Inhulets-2 Petrove	2017–18	Ukrainian Second League	1	0	0	0	0	0	0	0	1	0
Career total			194	6	16	1	0	0	5	0	215	7
