= 2016–17 Ukrainian Football Amateur League =

Ukrainian Football Amateur League
- Season: 2016–17
- Dates: 13 August 2016 – 19 June 2017
- Champions: Ahrobiznes Volochysk (1st title) Metalist 1925 Kharkiv (losing finalist)
- Promoted: 6 – Ahrobiznes, Metalist 1925, Nyva Trp, Polissya, Lviv, Tavriya S.
- Relegated: 7 teams (withdrawn)

The 2016–17 Ukrainian Football Amateur League season was the 21st since it replaced the competition of physical culture clubs. The competition started on 13 August 2016.

There were two groups with 12 teams in Group A and 12 teams in Group B. The last season winner FC Balkany Zorya has participated in professional Second League.

On 29 August 2016, SC Tavriya Simferopol was admitted to the competition.

== Teams ==
=== Returning/reformed clubs ===
- Kovel-Volyn (returning, last played season in 2001 as FC Kovel)
- FC Chortkiv-Peduniversytet (returning, last played season in 1991 as Krystal Chortkiv)

=== Debut ===
List of teams that are debuting this season in the league.

- Avanhard Koryukivka
- Metalist 1925 Kharkiv
- Tavriya Simferopol
- Inhulets-3 Petrove
- Nyva Terebovlya
- Viktoriya Mykolayivka
- Kvadro Pervomaiskyi
- Oskar Pidhiria
- FC Lviv
- MFC Pervomaisk

=== Withdraw teams ===
List of clubs that took part in last year's competition, but chose not to participate in the 2016–17 season.

- Avanhard Kakhovka
- FC Voloka
- Kolos Khlibodarivka
- Kryvbas Kryvyi Rih
- FC Vinnytsia

=== Location map ===
Home venues of teams in the 2016–17 Ukrainian Amateur League.
Due to the Annexation of Crimea by the Russian Federation SC Tavriya Simferopol plays its games in Beryslav.

== Group 1 ==
Pos	Team	Pld	W	D	L	GF	GA	GD	Pts	Comments
1	Ahrobiznes Volochysk (C, P)	20	14	6	0	36	5	+31	48	Championship final (Note: Article 6, paragraph 3 of the season's regulations); Admission to Ukrainian Second League
2	Chaika Kyiv-Sviatoshyn Raion	20	12	3	5	28	16	+12	39	
3	Oskar Pidhiria	20	11	5	4	32	18	+14	38	
4	ODEK Orzhiv	20	12	1	7	34	18	+16	37	
5	Rochyn Sosnivka (Note: In the beginning of 2017 FC Hirnyk Sosnivka changed its name to FC Rochyn Sosnivka.)	20	10	7	3	24	10	+14	37	
6	Nyva Terebovlia	20	8	2	10	20	26	−6	26	
7	Nyva Ternopil (P)	20	5	6	9	15	24	−9	21	Admission to Ukrainian Second League
8	Kovel-Volyn Kovel	20	5	4	11	25	35	−10	19	
9	FC Malynsk	20	5	3	12	23	36	−13	18	
10	FC Lviv (P)	20	3	4	13	19	31	−12	13	Admission to Ukrainian Second League
11	Chortkiv-Peduniversytet	20	3	3	14	17	54	−37	12	
12	FC Lutsk (D)	2	0	0	2	2	4	−2	0	Withdrawn at the start, results annulled (Note: On 31 August 2016, FC Lutsk withdrew from competitions after playing only two games. FC Lutsk lost both games with the same result 1:2 to FC Lviv and FC Kovel-Volyn Kovel. All results were annulled.)

Updated to match(es) played on unknown. Source:
(C) Champions; (D) Disqualified; (P) Promoted

=== Top goalscorers ===
The top goalscorers are:

Rank	Player	Club	Games	Goals (Pen.)
1	(Ukraine) Mykola Temnyuk	Ahrobiznes Volochysk	17	15
2	(Ukraine) Vitaliy Bryksa	FC Malynsk	15	8
3	(Ukraine) Oleksandr Apanchuk	ODEK Orzhiv	19	7 (2)
4	(Ukraine) Ostap Mishchuk	FC Lviv	15	6
4	(Ukraine) Pavlo Dmytriv	Oskar Pidhiria	15	6

== Group 2 ==
Pos	Team	Pld	W	D	L	GF	GA	GD	Pts	Comments
1	Metalist 1925 Kharkiv (C, P)	20	13	4	3	46	18	+28	43	Championship final Admission to Ukrainian Second League
2	Tavria-Skif Rozdol	20	13	4	3	41	17	+24	43	
3	Yednist Plysky	20	9	6	5	22	22	0	33	
4	Viktoriya Mykolayivka	20	8	6	6	21	23	−2	30	
5	Solli Plyus Kharkiv	20	9	2	9	30	13	+17	29	Withdrawn during the season (Note: On 11 May 2017, it was announced that FC Solli-Plyus Kharkiv withdrew from competition and the next six remaining games will be counted as a technical loss.)
6	Polissya Zhytomyr (Note: In March 2017 MFC Zhytomyr renamed to FC Polissya Zhytomyr.) (P)	20	7	5	8	13	18	−5	26	Admission to Ukrainian Second League
7	Kvadro Pervomaisky	20	7	3	10	25	30	−5	24	Removed at the end of the season (Note: On 7 June 2017, FC Kvadro Pervomaiskyi was removed from the competition after it did not arrive for its second game of Round 20 against Tavriya-Skif.)
8	FC Vradiyivka	20	6	6	8	17	20	−3	24	
9	Tavriya Simferopol (P)	20	6	6	8	31	37	−6	24	Admission to Ukrainian Second League
10	MFC Pervomaisk	20	3	6	11	19	45	−26	15	
11	Avanhard Koryukivka	20	4	2	14	18	40	−22	14	
12	Inhulets-3 Petrove (Note: The regional team of Kirovohrad Oblast that composed predominantly out of FC Inhulets-3 Petrove recently won the first edition of FFU Regions' Cup and therefore will represent Ukraine at the UEFA Regions' Cup later in 2016. Some of Inhulets-3 games were postponed due to that.) (D)	4	0	1	3	6	12	−6	1	Withdrawn at the start; results annulled (Note: On 20 October 2016, it was announced that FC Inhulets-3 Petrove withdrew from competition and all its record was annulled.)

Updated to match(es) played on unknown. Source:
(C) Champions; (D) Disqualified; (P) Promoted

=== Top goalscorers ===
The top goalscorers are:

Rank	Player	Club	Games	Goals (Pen.)
1	(Ukraine) Denys Skotarenko	Kvadro / Metalist 1925	18	14
2	(Ukraine) Serhiy Zhyhalov	Tavria-Skif Rozdol	15	9
3	(Ukraine) Serhiy Davydov	Metalist 1925	20	8
4	(Ukraine) Yevhen Sokolan	Tavriya Simferopol	16	7
5	(Ukraine) Oleh Synytsia	Metalist 1925	19	7 (3)

== Championship final ==
Winners of groups have qualified for the championship final. According to the regulations, in case if the winner refuse to participate or was excluded, it will be replaced with a team that placed the next in the final standings tournament table.

19 June 2017
18:30 UTC+3

Metalist 1925 Kharkiv	0–4	Ahrobiznes Volochysk
	Report	Temnyuk 21', 41', 71'; Hrusha 57'

NSC Olimpiyskiy, Kyiv
Referee: Mykola Kryvonosov (Kyiv)
- The match was interrupted in the 84th minute after Kharkiv fans invaded the pitch and the referees and players walked off.

== Promotions to the Second League ==
Conditions to participate in the 2017–18 Ukrainian Second League:

- No less than one season spent in football competitions of a regional football federation;
- Participated the 2016–17 Ukrainian football championship among amateurs for the whole season and placed in the final standings table no lower than the eight;
- Club received required attestation.

On 18 November 2016, a representative of the FFU Executive Committee confirmed receiving applications from SC Tavriya Simferopol, FC Metalist 1925 Kharkiv, FC Hirnyk Sosnivka, FC Nyva Ternopil, FC Ahrobiznes Volochysk, FC Lviv, and MFC Zhytomyr.

On 21 June 2017, six teams have been promoted to the 2017–18 Ukrainian Second League, including all abovementioned besides renamed FC Rochyn Sosnivka which have decided to play again in the Amateur League in the next season.

== Number of teams by region ==
Number	Region	Team(s)
3	Kharkiv Oblast	Kvadro Pervomaiskyi, Metalist 1925 Kharkiv, Solli-Plyus Kharkiv
3	Ternopil Oblast	Nyva Terebovlya, Nyva Ternopil, Chortkiv-Peduniversytet
2	Chernihiv Oblast	Avanhard Kryukivka, Yednist Plysky
2	Lviv Oblast	Hirnyk Sosnivka, FC Lviv
2	Mykolaiv Oblast	MFC Pervomaisk, FC Vradiivka
2	Rivne Oblast	FC Malynsk, ODEK Orzhiv
2	Volyn Oblast	Kovel-Volyn, FC Lutsk
1	Ivano-Frankivsk Oblast	Oskar Pidhiria
1	Kherson Oblast	Tavriya Simferopol (Crimea)
1	Khmelnytskyi Oblast	Ahrobiznes Volochysk
1	Kirovohrad Oblast	Inhulets-3 Petrove
1	Kyiv Oblast	Chaika Petropavlivska Borshchahivka
1	Sumy Oblast	Viktoriya Mykolaivka
1	Zaporizhia Oblast	Tavria-Skif Rozdol
1	Zhytomyr Oblast	MFC Zhytomyr

== See also ==
- 2016–17 Ukrainian Amateur Cup
