= Yevhen Yemayev =

Ukrainian footballer

Personal information
- Full name: Yevhen Vitaliyovych Yemayev
- Date of birth: 25 July 1999 (age 27)
- Place of birth: Volochysk, Ukraine
- Height: 1.73 m (5 ft 8 in)
- Position: Left midfielder

Team information
- Current team: Ahrobiznes Volochysk
- Number: 12

Youth career
- 2012–2016: Skala Stryi

Senior career*
Years	Team	Apps	(Gls)
2016–2017	Skala Stryi	0	(0)
2017	Ahrobiznes Volochysk	4	(3)
2018	Zbruch-Ahrobiznes Pidvolochysk	11	(2)
2019	Naftovyk Boryslav	6	(1)
2020	Zbruch-Ahrobiznes Pidvolochysk	10	(0)
2021–	Ahrobiznes Volochysk	6	(0)
- * Club domestic league appearances and goals as of 16 October 2021

Yevhen Vitaliyovych Yemayev (Ukrainian: Євген Віталійович Ємаєв; born 25 July 1999) is a Ukrainian professional footballer who plays as a left midfielder for Ukrainian club Ahrobiznes Volochysk.
