= Ralyuchenko =

Ralyuchenko (Ukrainian: Ралюченко) is a Ukrainian surname. Notable people with the surname include:

- Andriy Ralyuchenko (born 1995), Ukrainian footballer
- Serhiy Ralyuchenko (1962–2024), Ukrainian footballer and coach
