= Volodymyr Rudyuk =

Ukrainian footballer

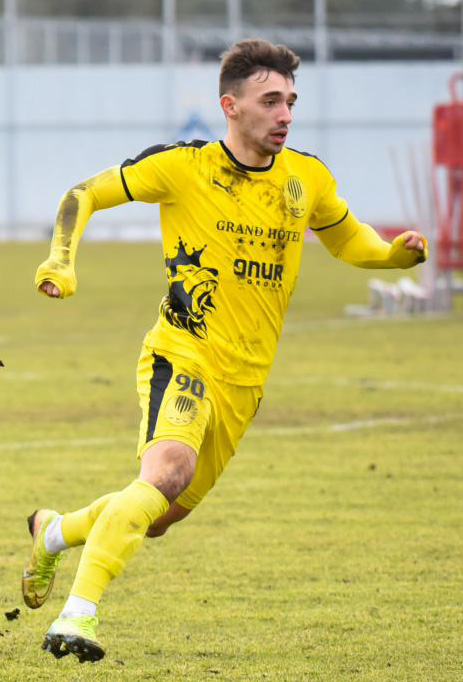
- Volodymyr Rudyuk playing for Rukh Lviv U-21 in 2021

Personal information
- Full name: Volodymyr Mykolayovych Rudyuk
- Date of birth: 22 April 2000 (age 26)
- Place of birth: Shmyrky, Khmelnytskyi Oblast, Ukraine
- Height: 1.68 m (5 ft 6 in)
- Position: Central midfielder

Team information
- Current team: Podillya Khmelnytskyi
- Number: 21

Youth career
- 2012–2013: Podillya Khmelnytskyi
- 2014–2017: UFK-Karpaty Lviv

Senior career*
Years	Team	Apps	(Gls)
2017–2020	Karpaty Lviv	0	(0)
2020–2024	Rukh Lviv	0	(0)
2021–2024	→ Prykarpattia Ivano-Frankivsk (loan)	61	(3)
2024–2025	Prykarpattia Ivano-Frankivsk	13	(0)
2025–26	Podillya Khmelnytskyi	29	(1)
2026-	FC Ahrobiznes Volochysk	11	(2)

International career
2016	Ukraine U17	1	(0)
- * Club domestic league appearances and goals as of 4 June 2026

Volodymyr Mykolayovych Rudyuk (Ukrainian: Володимир Миколайович Рудюк; born 22 April 2000) is a Ukrainian professional footballer who plays as a central midfielder for Ukrainian club Podillya Khmelnytskyi.
