= Bohdan Semenets =

Ukrainian footballer

Personal information
- Full name: Bohdan Ivanovych Semenets
- Date of birth: 27 November 1990 (age 35)
- Place of birth: Kotiv, Soviet Union (now Ukraine)
- Height: 1.75 m (5 ft 9 in)
- Position: Centre-forward

Team information
- Current team: Chaika Petropavlivska Borshchahivka
- Number: 16

Youth career
- 2003: Ternopil sports school
- 2004–2006: Inter-Hol Berezhany

Senior career*
Years	Team	Apps	(Gls)
2007–2008	Nyva Ternopil	23	(2)
2010–2015	Ternopil	99	(50)
2012	Shlyakhovyk Zapytiv (amateurs)	5	(5)
2015–2016	Poltava	28	(6)
2016–2017	Helios Kharkiv	32	(1)
2017–2022	Ahrobiznes Volochysk	116	(37)
2022–2023	Nyva Buzova	17	(4)
2023–	Chaika Petropavlivska Borshchahivka	25	(12)

International career
2013–2015	Ukraine (students)		
- * Club domestic league appearances and goals as of 15 June 2024

Bohdan Ivanovych Semenets (Ukrainian: Богдан Іванович Семенець; born 27 November 1990) is a Ukrainian professional footballer who plays as a centre-forward for Chaika Petropavlivska Borshchahivka in the Ukrainian Second League.

== Club career ==
=== Early years ===
Semenets is a product of the Ternopil regional youth system playing for the Ternopil city sports school and the youth club Inter-Hol Berezhany.

=== Ternopil ===
Semenets became the top scorer along with Vladyslav Korobkin and Andriy Draholyuk when he scored 15 goals for Ternopil during the 2012–13 Ukrainian Second League season.

== International career ==
Semenets was a member of Ukraine national student football team at the 2013 and 2015 Summer Universiades.

== Honours ==
Niva Buzova

- Ukrainian Second League: 2022–23
