= FC Sudnobudivnyk Mykolaiv (2016) =

Sudnobudivnyk Mykolaiv
- Full name: FC Sudnobudivnyk Mykolaiv
- Founded: 2016
- Dissolved: 2018
- Ground: Central Stadium, Mykolaiv
- Capacity: 16,700
- Chairman: (United States) Dennis Lukens
- Head coach: (United States) Dennis Lukens
- League: Ukrainian Second League
- 2016–17: 17th

FC Sudnobudivnyk Mykolaiv was a professional Ukrainian football from Mykolaiv. The club started to compete at professional level since the 2016–17 Ukrainian Second League.

== Head coaches ==
- (United States) Dennis Lukens (1 July 2016 – 25 June 2017)
- (Ukraine) Viktor Zhurov (25 June 2017 – 23 July 2017)
- (United States) Dennis Lukens (23 July 2017 – 2018)

== League and cup history ==
Season	Div.	Pos.	Pl.	W	D	L	GS	GA	P	Cup	Europe	Notes
2016	4th	4	6	0	2	4	3	10	2			
2016–17	3rd	17	32	6	4	22	19	84	22			
2017–18	3rd	11	33	5	4	24	33	95	19			Group B

== See also ==
- FC Enerhiya Mykolaiv, a single season club from Mykolaiv
- FC Vodnyk Mykolaiv, another single season club from Mykolaiv
