= 2015–16 FFU Regions' Cup =

Tournament details
- Country: Ukraine
- Dates: 20 September 2015 – 30 August 2016
- Teams: 25

Final positions
- Champions: Kirovohrad Oblast (1st title)
- Runners-up: Lviv Oblast
- Third place: Chernihiv Oblast
- Fourth place: Sumy Oblast
- 2017 UEFA Regions' Cup: Kirovohrad Oblast (Inhulets)

Tournament statistics
- Matches played: 42

2015–16 FFU Regions' Cup (Ukrainian: Кубок регіонів ФФУ, Kubok rehioniv FFU) was the first season of the Football Federation of Ukraine new competition at regional level. The competition is conducted among football teams of Oblasts (regions) composed of players who compete at oblast championships (regional competitions). The season kicked off on 20 September 2015 and all 25 participants were split into four divisions (Western, Central, Southern, and Eastern).

The winner of the competition was intended to represent Ukraine at the 2017 UEFA Regions' Cup. Before introduction of this competition, Ukraine was represented at the UEFA Regions' Cup usually by the winner of its amateur league (on some occasion the winner of amateur cup competition). The 2015–16 FFU Regions' Cup winner Kirovohrad Oblast consisted majorly out players of Inhulets-3 Petrove which as AF Pyatykhatska competed at the 2015 UEFA Regions' Cup.

== Team allocation ==
=== Distribution ===
Qualification round (18 teams)	18 entrants	
Main event (16 teams)	7 entrants	9 winners from the Qualification round

=== Round and draw dates ===
Phase	Round	Draw date	First leg	Second leg
Preliminary	Qualifying	3 September 2015	20 September 2015	27 September 2015
Main event	Round of 16	3 September 2015	4 October 2015	11 October 2015
Main event	Quarter-finals	TBA	TBD	TBD
Main event	Semi-finals	TBA	TBD	TBD
Main event	Final	TBA	30 August 2016	

== Competition schedule ==
=== Qualification round ===
==== Western Division ====
Team 1	Agg.	Team 2	1st leg	2nd leg
Chernivtsi Oblast	2–2 (a)	Ivano-Frankivsk Oblast	1–0	1–2
Rivne Oblast	1–0	Ternopil Oblast	1–0	0–0
Volyn Oblast	0–4	Lviv Oblast	0–2	0–2

==== Central Division ====
Team 1	Agg.	Team 2	1st leg	2nd leg
Kyiv Oblast	2–2 (4–5 p)	Chernihiv Oblast	1–1	1–1
Khmelnytskyi Oblast	1–1 (1–4 p)	Vinnytsia Oblast	1–0	0–1

==== Southern Division ====
Team 1	Agg.	Team 2	1st leg	2nd leg
Mykolaiv Oblast	2–6	Odesa Oblast	0–2	2–4
Kirovohrad Oblast	10–2	Kherson Oblast	7–0	3–2

==== Eastern Division ====
Team 1	Agg.	Team 2	1st leg	2nd leg
Donetsk Oblast	5–1	Dnipropetrovsk Oblast	2–0	3–1
Poltava Oblast	4–4 (a)	Luhansk Oblast	0–3	4–1

Notes

1. The team of Odesa Oblast was taken out of the competition for trespassing paragraph 1 of Article 33 of the Regulations and was replaced with the team of Mykolaiv Oblast.

=== Round of 16 ===
Most matches were played on 4 and 11 October.

==== Western Division ====
Team 1	Agg.	Team 2	1st leg	2nd leg
Rivne Oblast	2–4	Lviv Oblast	2–0	0–4
Chernivtsi Oblast		Zakarpattia Oblast	1–2	

==== Central Division ====
Team 1	Agg.	Team 2	1st leg	2nd leg
Kyiv City	2–5	Vinnytsia Oblast	0–2	2–3
Chernihiv Oblast	6–3	Zhytomyr Oblast	5–0	1–3

==== Southern Division ====
Team 1	Agg.	Team 2	1st leg	2nd leg
Zaporizhia Oblast (Zaporizhzhia Oblast)	6–3	Mykolaiv Oblast	5–0	1–3
Kirovohrad Oblast		Cherkasy Oblast	3–0	

==== Eastern Division ====
Team 1	Agg.	Team 2	1st leg	2nd leg
Kharkiv Oblast	3–2	Poltava Oblast	3–0	0–2
Donetsk Oblast	0–3	Sumy Oblast	0–0	0–3

Notes

1. Match postponed to 9 October.
2. Match was played on 1 November 2015.
3. Match was played on 11 and 18 October. Legs were reversed.
4. Matches were played on 14 and 21 October.

=== Quarter-finals ===
Matches were played on 13 and 20 April 2016.

Team 1	Agg.	Team 2	1st leg	2nd leg
Lviv Oblast	4–3	Zakarpattia Oblast	2–1	2–2
Chernihiv Oblast	3–2	Vinnytsia Oblast	1–0	2–2
Zaporizhia Oblast (Zaporizhzhia Oblast)	1–5	Kirovohrad Oblast	1–1	0–4
Sumy Oblast	w/o	Kharkiv Oblast	0–1	

Notes

1. The team of Kharkiv Oblast was excluded from competitions for breaching regulations.

=== Semi-finals ===
Matches were played on 15 and 22 May 2016.

Team 1	Agg.	Team 2	1st leg	2nd leg
Chernihiv Oblast	3–4	Lviv Oblast	3–2	0–2
Sumy Oblast	3–6	Kirovohrad Oblast	1–3	2–3

=== Final ===
Final was originally scheduled to be played on 23 August 2016 at the Bannikov Stadium (according to the Vynnyky Plyus web portal). On 23 August 2016 the FC Inhulets Petrove official website announced that the final would held on 30 August 2016 at the Melnyk Central Stadium in Obukhiv at 16:00.

30 August 2016	Lviv Oblast	0–2	Kirovohrad Oblast	Kolos Stadium, Boryspil
16:00 LST		Report	Sinchikov 18'; Korchynsky 37'; Markovets (red card) 82'

== Bracket ==
Round of 32
Kyiv Oblast	1	1	2(4)
Chernihiv Oblast (p)	1	1	2(5)
Zhytomyr Oblast
bye (no team)
Kyiv City
bye (no team)
Khmelnytskyi Oblast	1	0	1(1)
Vinnytsia Oblast (p)	0	1	1(4)
Rivne Oblast	1	0	1
Ternopil Oblast	0	0	0
Volyn Oblast	0	0	0
Lviv Oblast	2	2	4
Chernivtsi Oblast (away goal rule)	1	1	2
Ivano-Frankivsk Oblast	0	2	2
Zakarpattia Oblast
bye (no team)
Donetsk Oblast	2	3	5
Dnipropetrovsk Oblast	0	1	1
Sumy Oblast
bye (no team)
Kharkiv Oblast
bye (no team)
Poltava Oblast (away goal rule)	0	4	4
Luhansk Oblast	3	1	4
Zaporizhia Oblast
bye (no team)
Mykolaiv Oblast	0	2	+
Odesa Oblast	2	4	–
Kirovohrad Oblast	7	3	10
Kherson Oblast	0	2	2
Cherkasy Oblast
bye (no team)

Round of 16
Chernihiv Oblast	5	1	6
Zhytomyr Oblast	0	3	3
Kyiv City	0	2	2
Vinnytsia Oblast	2	3	5
Rivne Oblast	2	0	2
Lviv Oblast	0	4	4
Chernivtsi Oblast	1	?	?
Zakarpattia Oblast	2	?	?
Donetsk Oblast	0	0	0
Sumy Oblast	0	3	3
Kharkiv Oblast	3	0	3
Poltava Oblast	0	2	2
Zaporizhia Oblast	5	1	6
Mykolaiv Oblast	0	3	3
Kirovohrad Oblast	3	?	?
Cherkasy Oblast	0	?	?

Quarterfinals
Chernihiv Oblast	1	2	3
Vinnytsia Oblast	0	2	2
Lviv Oblast	2	2	4
Zakarpattia Oblast	1	2	3
Sumy Oblast	0	+	+
Kharkiv Oblast	1	–	–
Zaporizhia Oblast	1	0	1
Kirovohrad Oblast	1	4	5

Semifinals
Chernihiv Oblast	3	0	3
Lviv Oblast	2	2	4
Sumy Oblast	1	2	3
Kirovohrad Oblast	3	3	6

Final
Lviv Oblast	0
Kirovohrad Oblast	2

== See also ==
- FFU Council of Regions
