= Vyacheslav Khruslov =

Ukrainian football coach (born 1962)

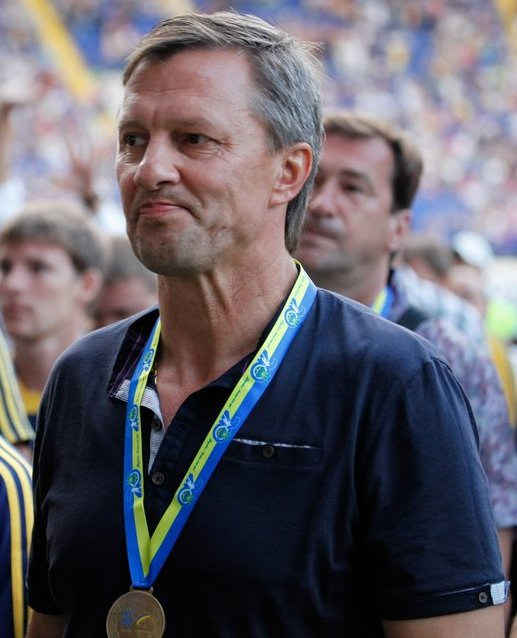

Personal information
- Full name: Vyacheslav Mykhaylovych Khruslov
- Date of birth: 18 September 1962 (age 64)
- Place of birth: Kharkiv, Ukrainian SSR
- Height: 1.84 m (6 ft 0 in)
- Positions: Defender; midfielder

Youth career
- KhGVUFK-1 Kharkiv
- Metalist Kharkiv

Senior career*
| Years | Team | Apps | (Gls) |
| 1983–1986 | Mayak Kharkiv | 114 | (0) |
| 1987 | FC Metalurh Kupyansk | | |
| 1988–1990 | Polissya Zhytomyr | 124 | (6) |
| 1991–1992 | Avtomobilist Sumy | 85 | (17) |
| 1993–1994 | Dynamo Kyiv | 21 | (2) |
| 1993–1994 | → Dynamo-2 Kyiv (loan) | 4 | (0) |
| 1994–1995 | Dynamo-Gazovik Tyumen | 32 | (0) |
| 1995–1998 | Metalist Kharkiv | 59 | (6) |
| 1997–1998 | → Metalist-2 Kharkiv (loan) | 4 | (0) |
| 1998–1999 | Arsenal Kharkiv | 3 | (0) |

Managerial career
- 1997–2003: Metalist-2 Kharkiv (assistant)
- 2003: Metalist-2 Kharkiv
- 2005–2011: Metalist Kharkiv (assistant)
- 2011: Metalist Kharkiv (scout)
- 2014–2016: Dnipro Dnipropetrovsk (assistant)
- 2017: Metalist 1925 Kharkiv (caretaker)
- 2020: Metalist 1925 Kharkiv (caretaker)
- * Club domestic league appearances and goals

Vyacheslav Mykhaylovych Khruslov (Ukrainian: Вячеслав Михайлович Хруслов; born 18 September 1962) is a Ukrainian football coach and a former player.

== Career ==
Khruslov was born in Kharkiv. He worked as an assistant coach for Dnipro Dnipropetrovsk.

== Honours ==
Dynamo Kyiv

- Ukrainian Premier League: 1992–93
- Ukrainian Cup: 1992–93
