= Oleksandr Poklonskyi =

Ukrainian footballer and manager

Personal information
- Full name: Oleksandr Volodymyrovych Poklonskyi
- Date of birth: 22 January 1975 (age 51)
- Place of birth: Dnipropetrovsk, Ukrainian SSR
- Height: 1.78 m (5 ft 10 in)
- Position: Defender

Team information
- Current team: Zimbru Chișinău (head coach)

Senior career*
Years	Team	Apps	(Gls)
1992	Prometei Dniprodzerzhynsk	10	(0)
1993	Tavriya Kherson	36	(2)
1993	Vorskla Poltava	13	(0)
1994	Tavriya Kherson	8	(0)
1995–1996	Podillya Khmelnytskyi	51	(3)
1996–2004	Dnipro Dnipropetrovsk	172	(9)
1997–2004	→ Dnipro-2 Dnipropetrovsk	14	(1)
2002	→ Dnipro-3 Dnipropetrovsk	1	(0)
2005	Tavriya Simferopol	21	(2)
2006	Kryvbas Kryvyi Rih	5	(0)
2007	Zorya Luhansk	10	(0)
2007	Simurq PIK	2	(0)
2007–2008	CSKA Kyiv	15	(2)
2008–2009	Kyzylzhar	13	(1)
2009	Naftovyk-Ukrnafta Okhtyrka	10	(0)
Total		381	(20)

International career
1996–1997	Ukraine U21	10	(0)
2002	Ukraine	1	(0)

Managerial career
- 2013–2017: Dnipro (assistant)
- 2017–2019: Dnipro
- 2019–2021: Dnipro-1 (U21)
- 2021: Nikopol
- 2021–2023: VPK-Ahro Shevchenkivka
- 2023: Samgurali Tsqaltubo
- 2025: Muras United
- 2025: Turan
- 2026–: Zimbru Chișinău
- * Club domestic league appearances and goals

Oleksandr Volodymyrovych Poklonskyi (Ukrainian: Олександр Володимирович Поклонський; born 22 January 1975) is a retired Ukrainian professional footballer and current manager. He is the current head coach of Moldovan Liga club Zimbru Chișinău.

== Hounors ==
Player

- Ukrainian Cup
  - Runners-up: 1997, 2004
