= Hryhoriy Varzhelenko =

Soviet footballer and coach (1950–2024)

Personal information
- Full name: Hryhoriy Tykhonovych Varzhelenko
- Date of birth: 8 March 1950
- Place of birth: Nikopol, Ukrainian SSR, USSR
- Date of death: 16 February 2024 (aged 73)
- Position: Second striker

Youth career
- –1967: SC Trubnik Nikopol

Senior career*
Years	Team	Apps	(Gls)
1967–1971	Trubnik Nikopol		
1972–1974	Kolos Nikopol		
1973	→ Avanhard Ordzhonikidze		

Managerial career
- 1990: Start Eisk (ass't)
- 1996–1999: Metalurh Nikopol
- 2000: Polissia Zhytomyr
- 2004–2005: Elektrometalurh-NZF Nikopol
- 2010: Nikopol-Dnipriany
- 2016–2020: FC Nikopol
- 2020–2021: FC Nikopol (team's chief)
- 2021–: Skoruk Tomakivka (ass't)
- * Club domestic league appearances and goals

Hryhoriy Varzhelenko (Ukrainian: Григорій Тихонович Варжеленко; 8 March 1950 – 16 February 2024) was a Soviet and Ukrainian football coach and player.

Varzhelenko started in 1960s being invited to play for a factory team of Trubnik Nikopol. He played for Nikopol professional clubs in 1960-1970s. He was forced to retire early at 24 due to knee injury.

In 1990s, Varzhelenko began to coach including his home teams FC Elektrometalurh-NZF Nikopol and FC Nikopol as well as FC Polissya Zhytomyr.

As a coach, Varzhelenko became a first coach for such players like Dmytro Topchiyev, Pavlo Yakovenko, Mykola Kudrytskyi, and others.

Varzhelenko died on 16 February 2024, at the age of 73.
