= Andriy Kononenko =

Ukrainian footballer and coach

Personal information
- Full name: Andriy Viktorovych Kononenko
- Date of birth: 7 March 1974 (age 52)
- Place of birth: Sumy, Ukrainian SSR, Soviet Union
- Position: Forward

Senior career*
Years	Team	Apps	(Gls)
1991	Mayak Kharkiv	1	(0)
1992–1993	Lokomotyv Konotop	6	(0)
1996	Hirnyk-Sport Komsomolsk	7	(1)
2002	Shakhtar Konotop		

Managerial career
- 2011–2013: Sumy (assistant)
- 2013: Sumy (caretaker)
- 2013–2014: Sumy
- 2015–2016: Barsa Sumy
- 2016–2017: Inhulets-2 Petrove
- 2019: Krystal Kherson (caretaker)
- 2019: Mykolaiv-2 (assistant)
- 2019: Mykolaiv (assistant)
- 2022: Unia Solec Kujawski
- 2023–2024: Zawisza Bydgoszcz II
- * Club domestic league appearances and goals

Andriy Kononenko (Ukrainian: Андрій Вікторович Кононенко; born 7 March 1974) is a Ukrainian professional football manager and former player, most recently in charge of Polish club Zawisza Bydgoszcz's reserve team.
