= Dennis Lukens =

American soccer coach (born 1952)

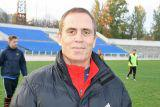

Personal information
- Date of birth: June 28, 1952 (age 74)

Youth career
- Springfield College

Senior career*
Years	Team	Apps	(Gls)
- Boston Storm

Managerial career
- 1988–1991: Bridgewater State College
- Boston Storm
- 2000: Bay Area Seals
- Saint Lucia U23
- 2012–2013: Krystal Kherson
- 2016–2017: Sudnobudivnyk Mykolaiv
- 2017–2018: Sudnobudivnyk Mykolaiv
- 2020–2021: Dublin County
- * Club domestic league appearances and goals

Dennis Lukens (born June 28, 1952) is an American professional soccer coach and former player.

== Playing career ==
Lukens played college soccer for Springfield College, and professionally for the Boston Storm. He was the founder of the Boston Storm.

== Coaching career ==
=== Early period ===
He began his career as a coach with Bridgewater State College between 1988 and 1991.

Lukens has been on the coaching staff of clubs such as the California Cougars (where he was Assistant Coach), and he was also Head Coach of both the Boston Storm, and the Bay Area Seals.

He has also been Head Coach of the Saint Lucia under-23 national team, as well as Krystal Kherson in the Ukrainian Second League. Lukens became the first American to coach soccer in the former Soviet Union, and the first to coach in Ukraine. In January 2014 he was one of six American coaches working professionally in Europe.

=== Career in Ukraine ===
Lukens was let go after the Olympic team of Saint Lucia failed to qualify for the 2008 Summer Olympics in Beijing (placed last in a group at preliminary stage) and he was looking for new opportunities. He decided to experiment with a career in Ukraine and the president of FC Sevastopol was one of few who help him with his efforts although Lukens tried out several other clubs before connecting with Sevastopol. In the football club "Sevastopol" Lukens was given a position of scouting department director. During his time in the club he was impressed with skills of the Polish footballer Mariusz Lewandowski, particularly his ball control and passing, and noted that players like Julius Aghahowa and Igor Duljaj deserved to be mentioned as well. Lukens left Sevastopol after Angel Chervenkov who arrived with his own coaching staff replaced Oleh Leshchynskyi in December 2010. In 2010-2012 when Lukens was in Sevastopol and Crimea, he never came across any conflict situations between Russians and Ukrainians as well no intentions to separate from Ukraine. After leaving FC Sevastopol, Lukens tried to get a coaching position in MFC Mykolaiv, but the president of the club refused to meet with him. Then, he contacted the president of Krystal Kherson Oleksiy Krucher who after few meeting gave him a position of a sports director. Lukens recalls that after his appointment he participated in training for about a week and after left for a month for the United States. Coached by Ruslan Novikov, during the 2012–13 season Krystal Kherson went on a losing streak gaining only a point in seven matches. President Krucher sacked the head coach and temporary acted as the club's manager before return of Lukens. Lukens who at that time already had the UEFA A coaching license allowing him to manage lower-tier clubs was appointed the new club's manager on 1 November 2012. At the end of the season Lukens left the club as it was sold to another businessman.

In 2016 he created own club in Ukraine and became its manager Sudnobudivnyk Mykolaiv (no connection to MFC Mykolaiv). He also works as the club's president. Lukens also acknowledged that at his club Sudnobudivnyk at some point was a problem with match fixing and he had to let go all of playing and coaching staff and hire team anew. He also mentioned that he considered Artem Sitalo as one of his perspective players.

Along with Oleksandr Petrakov, Anatoliy Tymoshchuk and Andriy Shevchenko, Lukens received his UEFA PRO license in Kyiv.

=== Later career ===
Lukens has also been Director of Coaching for the Massachusetts Youth Soccer Association, and he has worked with the United States Soccer Federation.

Later Lukens has been Technical Director for the Elite Development Academy out of Fullerton, California.

In 2020, Lukens became involved with Dublin County as team manager and chairman, in their bid to enter the League of Ireland First Division. Their bid was unsuccessful due to the club's issues in securing Morton Stadium for home games. Despite having two full-time staff and arranging 20 playing contracts, they lost out to Treaty United.

== Personal life ==
Dennis Lukens has a son who was born and grew up in Ukraine.
