= FC Nikopol =

- Full name: FC Nikopol
- Founded: 2009
- Dissolved: 2022
- Ground: Elektrometalurh Stadium, Nikopol, Dnipropetrovsk Oblast
- Capacity: 7,200
- 2021–22: Ukrainian Second League, Group B, 12th of 16 (withdrew)
Home colours	Away colours	Third colours

FC Nikopol was a Ukrainian football club from the city of Nikopol, Dnipropetrovsk oblast and Makiivka, Donetsk Oblast before 2015. Another FC Nikopol has existed in Nikopol prior to relocation of FC Makiivvuhillya.

On 21 June 2023 the 31st PFL Conference excluded several clubs that did not compete in the 2022–23 season and did not renew their membership.

== History ==
=== Makiyivvuhillya (Makeyevugol) ===
Emblem of Makiyivvuhillya (2009–2015)

It should be mentioned that previously Makiivvuhillya was represented by a team of the Bazhanov coal mine known as FC Shakhtar Makiivka.

The current club was formed in Makiivka in 2009 and became professional in 2011 entering the Professional Football League of Ukraine and was based in Makiivka under the name FC Makiyivvuhillya Makiyivka. The name of the club is associated Makiyivka's coal industry, since the city of Makiyivka is close proximity to the city of Donetsk. The football team was created out of the state mining enterprise Makiyivvuhillya in the summer of 2009 to participate in the Coal Industry Cup. In the finals of the Coal Industry Cup, a tournament which Makiyivka defeated SE "Dzerzhynskvuhillya."

After the event the company decided to continue supporting the football team, with general director Stanislav Tolchin becoming the honorary president of football club. The President of the club became Anatoly Akimochkin and head coach was Spartak Zhyhulin.

In the winter of 2009, Makiyivvuhillya won the city championship in Makiyivka and finished 3rd in the Donetsk oblast championship. In 2010 the team became a finalist of the Coal Industry Cup (losing to FC Shakhtar Sverdlovsk) and 3rd place again in the Donetsk oblast championship. In 2011, the team participated in the Ukrainian Amateur championship.

In the Second League the club played its home games at the Bazhanovets Stadium, which was also used by the former Soviet/Ukrainian club Shakhtar Makiyivka (also known as Bazhanovets) but the stadium was found lacking in facilities. Later the club played at Metalurh Stadium in Yenakiieve.

=== Nikopol-NPHU ===
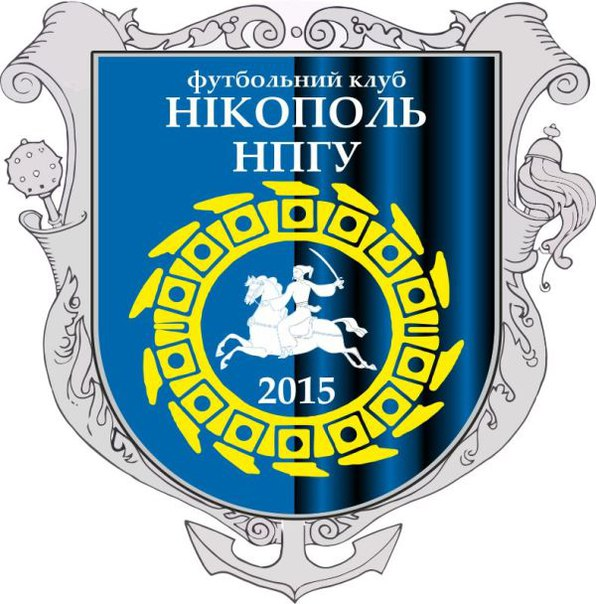
Logo used since 2015 till 2017.

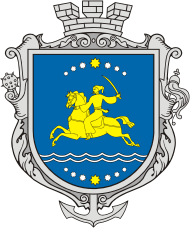
Nikopol city coat of arms

In 2014, the club was forced to relocate to Nikopol, Dnipropetrovsk Oblast, due to the 2014 Russian aggression against Ukraine. It also lost its main sponsor Makiyivvuhillya, but in Nikopol the club was taken under its wing the Independent Trade Union of Miners of Ukraine (NPHU) which added own abbreviation to the club's name as Makeyevugol-NPHU. After the 2014–15 season the club formally withdrew from the PFL and reentered under the name of FC Nikopol-NPHU.

The club plays at the stadium of FC Elektrometalurh-NZF Nikopol, while trains at the stadium of FC Kolos Chkalove from Chkalove.

=== FC Nikopol ===
During the winter break of the 2016–17 Ukrainian Second League season, the club renamed themselves to FC Nikopol.

== Other clubs in Nikopol ==
In Nikopol is another FC Nikopol that participated in the 2007 Ukrainian Amateur Cup and place third in football championships of Dnipropetrovsk Oblast in 2009 and 2013. Both FC Nikopol and FC Kolos Chkalove were withdrawn from the Dnipropetrovsk Oblast championship in 2015.

== Stadiums ==
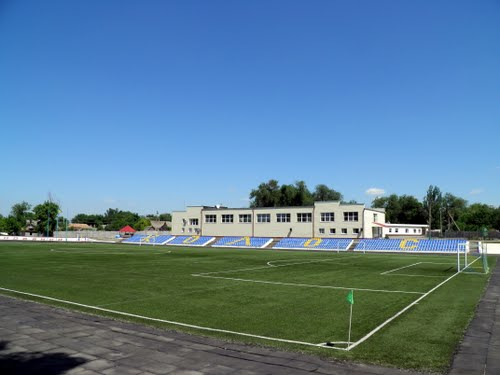
Kolos Stadium in Chkalove

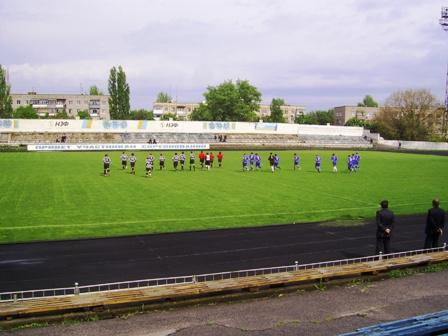
Elektrometalurh Stadium

== League and cup history ==
Season	Div.	Pos.	Pl.	W	D	L	GS	GA	P	Domestic Cup	Europe	Notes
Known as FC Makiyivvuhillya Makiivka
2011	4th	4	8	2	2	4	6	11	8			
2011–12	3rd "B"	14/14	26	5	2	19	17	8	17	1/32 finals		
2012–13	3rd "B"	12/13	24	5	2	17	21	58	17	1/64 finals		
2012–13	3rd "4"	4/5	32	8	3	21	32	71	27	1/64 finals		Relegation group
2013–14	3rd	13/19	36	13	6	17	33	47	45	1/64 finals		
2014–15	3rd	8/10	27	5	6	16	23	45	21			moved to Nikopol
reorganized as FC Nikopol-NPHU
2015–16	3rd	14/14	26	2	6	18	18	51	12	1/32 finals		
renamed as FC Nikopol
2016–17	3rd	11/17	32	12	5	15	40	49	41	1/64 finals		
2017–18	3rd "B"	7/12	33	11	12	10	36	34	45	1/32 finals		
2018–19	3rd "B"	10/10	27	3	4	20	15	54	13	1/64 finals		
2019–20	3rd "B"	6/11	20	6	6	8	22	24	24	1/64 finals		
2020–21	3rd "B"	11/12	22	3	5	14	18	46	14			
2021–22	3rd "B"	12/16	20	5	5	10	22	42	20			

== Coaches ==
Makiivvuhillya

- 2009-2009 Ihor Yefremenko
- 2009-2015 Spartak Zhyhulin

Nikopol-NHPU

- 2015-2016 Serhiy Zhytskyi
- 2016 Serhiy Valyayev
- 2016-2017 Hryhoriy Varzhelenko

Nikopol

- 2017-2020 Hryhoriy Varzhelenko
- 2021 Evgeny Yarovenko
- 2021 Serhiy Vorobey
- 2021 Oleksandr Poklonskyi

== See also ==
- FC Elektrometalurh Nikopol
- FC Shakhtar Makiivka
