= Park Peremohy Stadium =

Football stadium in Mykolaiv, Ukraine

Park Peremohy
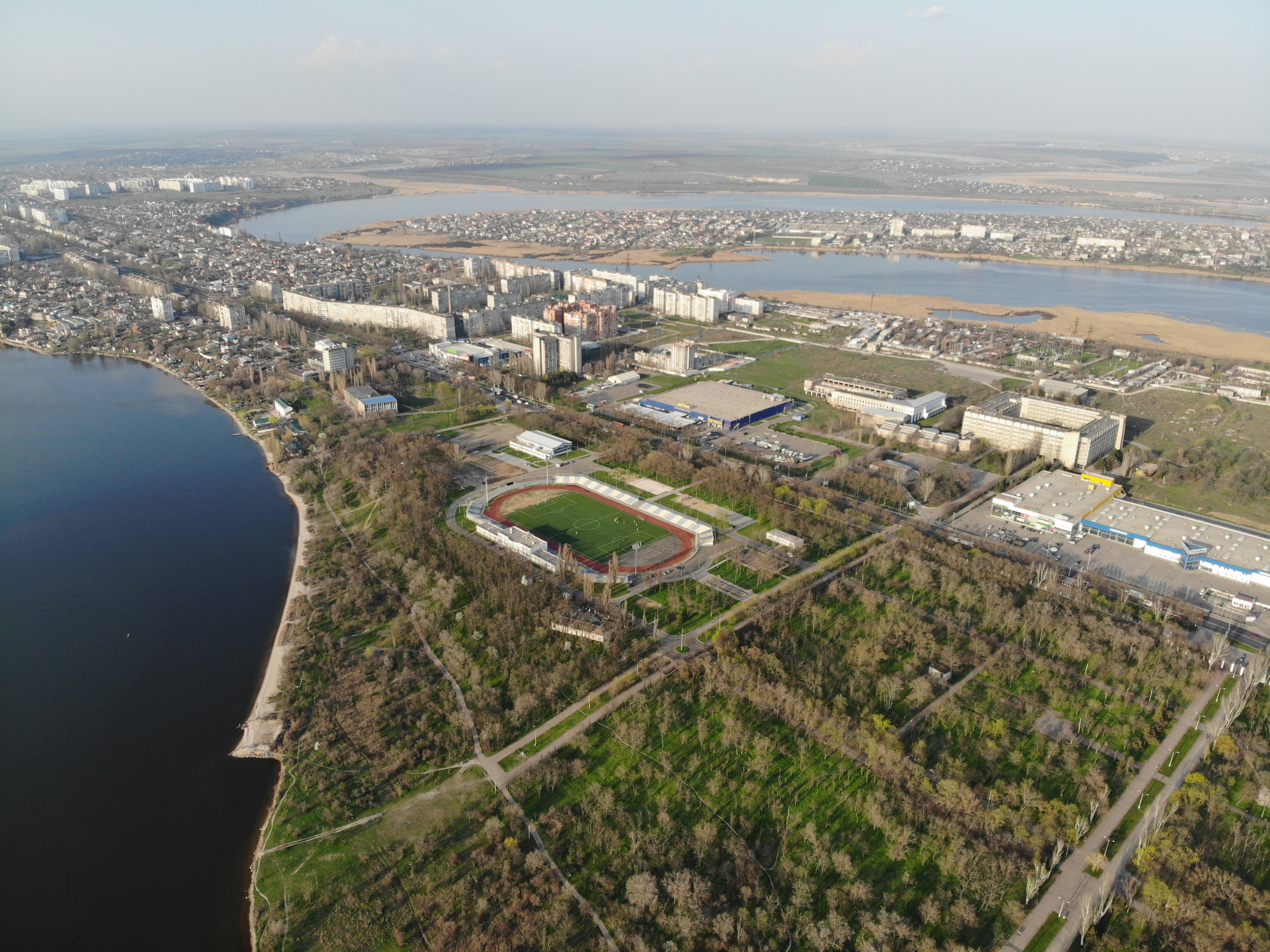
- in 2018, northward view
- Interactive map of Park Peremohy
- Location: Mykolaiv, Ukraine
- Coordinates: 46°59′19″N 31°59′45″E
- Owner: Mykolaiv Regional State Administration
- Capacity: 5,000
- Surface: Artificial

Construction
- Renovated: 2017

Tenant
- MFC Mykolaiv

Park Peremohy (Trudovi Rezervy) is a football stadium located in Mykolaiv, Southern Ukraine.

The seating capacity of the stadium is 5,000 seats.

The stadium is located in northern part of the city at the Victory Party (Park Peremohy).

The latest reconstruction of the stadium started in 2013 and was finally ended in 2017.
