= Oleksandr Apanchuk =

Ukrainian footballer

Personal information
- Full name: Oleksandr Viktorovych Apanchuk
- Date of birth: 2 November 1993 (age 33)
- Place of birth: Vilbivne, Rivne Oblast, Ukraine
- Height: 1.90 m (6 ft 3 in)
- Position: Centre-forward

Team information
- Current team: LKS Czaniec

Youth career
- 2008–2009: Velbivno
- 2010: KOLIPS Shturm Kostopil

Senior career*
Years	Team	Apps	(Gls)
2013	Burevisnyk Kremenets		
2014	Velbivno	14	(13)
2015–2017	ODEK Orzhiv	57	(14)
2017–2018	Nyva Ternopil	25	(5)
2018–2019	Juniors Shpytky	10	(10)
2020–2021	Dinaz Vyshhorod	39	(12)
2022	Ahrobiznes Volochysk	0	(0)
2022–	LKS Czaniec		
- * Club domestic league appearances and goals as of 13 July 2023

Oleksandr Viktorovych Apanchuk (Ukrainian: Олександр Вікторович Апанчук; born 2 November 1993) is a Ukrainian professional footballer who plays as a centre-forward for Polish IV liga club LKS Czaniec.
