= FC Inhulets-2 Petrove =

Inhulets-2 Petrove
- Full name: FC Inhulets-2 Petrove
- Founded: 2013
- Dissolved: 2018
- Ground: Povoroznyuk Stadium, Volodymyrivka
- Capacity: 1,720
- Chairman: Oleksandr Povoroznyuk
- League: Ukrainian Second League
- 2016–17: 6th
- Website: http://ingulec.com/
Home colours	Away colours

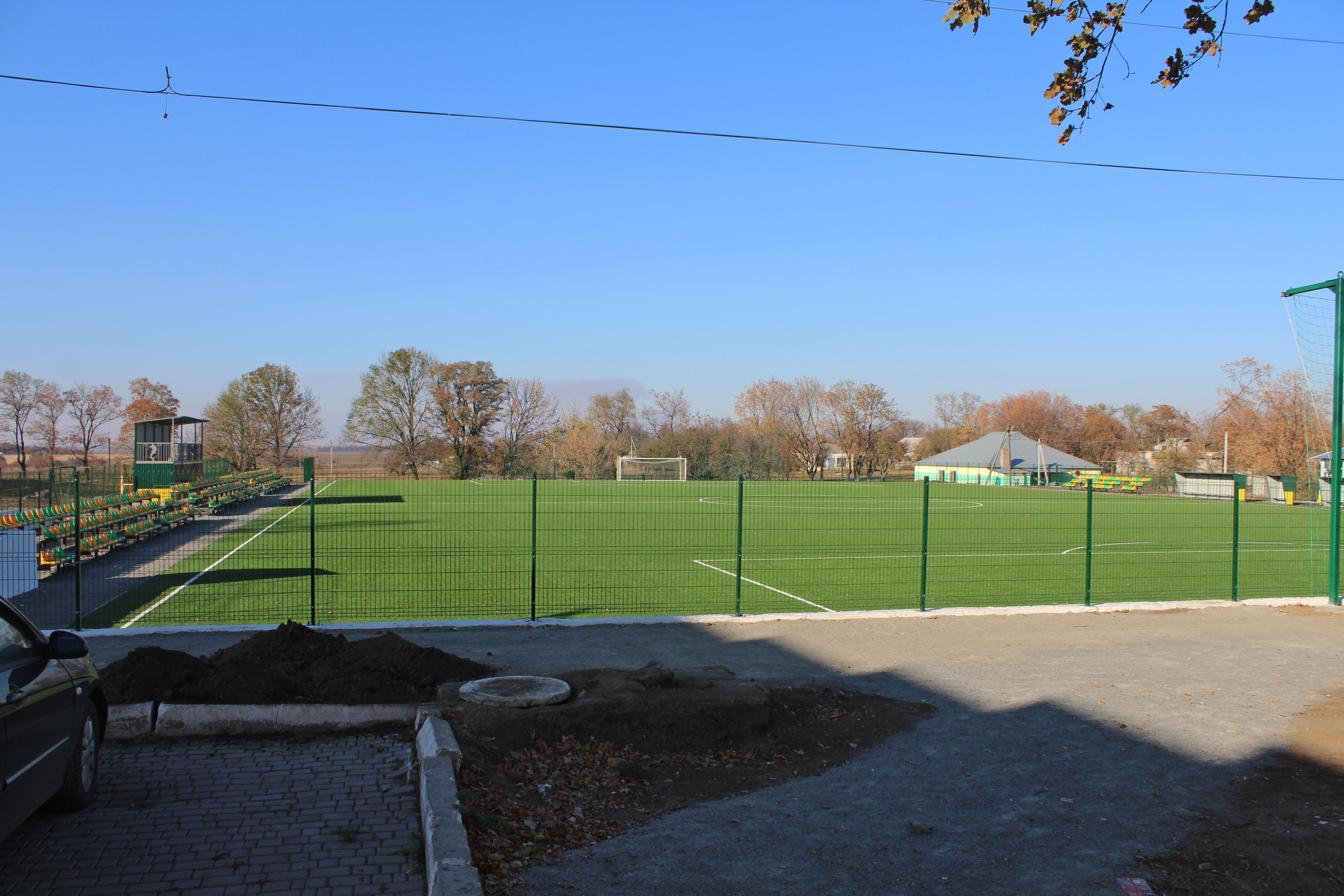
Povorozniuk Stadium in Volodymyrivka

FC Inhulets-2 Petrove was the reserve team of professional Ukrainian football club Inhulets Petrove from the town of Petrove, Kirovohrad Oblast.

== History ==
The first appearance of the club was in 2013 when they competed in the Kirovohrad oblast Premier League "West" competition. The club was called FC AF Pyatykhatska-2 Volodymyrivka. The team finished second in the competition to their senior squad.

The following season in 2015 the team won the Kirovohrad oblast Premier League "East" competition as FC Inhulets-2 Petrove, and followed that by winning the Kirovohrad oblast championship.

After the senior team was admitted to the 2015-16 Ukrainian Second League, Inhulets-2 Petrove continued the club's participation in the 2015 Ukrainian Football Amateur League with its second team Inhulets-2 reaching the second stage of the competition.

The club again competed in 2016 in the 2016 Amateur League finishing third in their group as well as participation in the 2016 Kirovohrad oblast Premier League "East" competition.
On promotion of the senior team to the Ukrainian First League in 2016 due to expansion of the competition, the club also applied that the reserve team enter the PFL.
The club successfully passed attestation and will compete in the 2016–17 Ukrainian Second League season.

== Honors ==
- FFU Regions' Cup (as Kirovohrad Oblast football team)
  - Winners (1): 2015-2016
- Kirovohrad Oblast Championship
  - Winner (1): 2015
  - Runner-up: 2014 ("East")

== League and cup history ==
Season	Div.	Pos.	Pl.	W	D	L	GS	GA	P	Cup	Europe	Notes
2015	4th	4	3	1	0	2	1	6	3	1/4 finals		Replaced FC Inhulets Petrove in finals
2016	4th	3	6	1	1	4	4	11	4			failed to qualify for finals
2016–17	3rd	6	32	14	8	10	50	33	50			
2017–18	3rd	10	33	4	7	22	29	70	19			dissolved after the season

== Coaches ==
- 2014–2016: Yevhen Proshenko
- 2016–2017: Andriy Kononenko (previously with FC Barsa Sumy)
- 2017–2018: Mykola Fedorko

== Inhulets-3 Petrove ==
After Inhulets-2 was promoted to the Ukrainian Second League in 2016, Inhulets entered its third team Inhulets-3 to the 2016-17 Ukrainian Football Amateur League.

Season	Div.	Pos.	Pl.	W	D	L	GS	GA	P	Cup	Europe		Notes
2016–17	4th	12	4	0	1	3	6	12	1		RC	Finals	withdrew

For the 2017 UEFA Regions' Cup where Ukraine was represented by a team of Kirovohrad Oblast (Kirovograd Region according to the UEFA), which was composed out of the Inhulets' reserve team, UEFA admitted the team under the name of "Ingulee, Kirovograd Region", later Ingulec.

Games of Ingulee in UEFA competitions
Season	Competition	Round	Club	Home	Away	Aggregate
2017	UEFA Regions' Cup	Group 1	Ligue Paris Ile-de-France	—	2–1	1st
2017	UEFA Regions' Cup	Group 1	East West Central Scotland	—	3–0	1st
2017	UEFA Regions' Cup	Group 1	(Malta) Gozo	—	3–1	1st
2017	UEFA Regions' Cup	Group A	(Turkey) Istanbul	—	0–3	4th
2017	UEFA Regions' Cup	Group A	(Portugal) Lisboa	—	3–3	4th
2017	UEFA Regions' Cup	Group A	(Croatia) Zagreb	—	1–4	4th
