= Andriy Donets =

Ukrainian former footballer

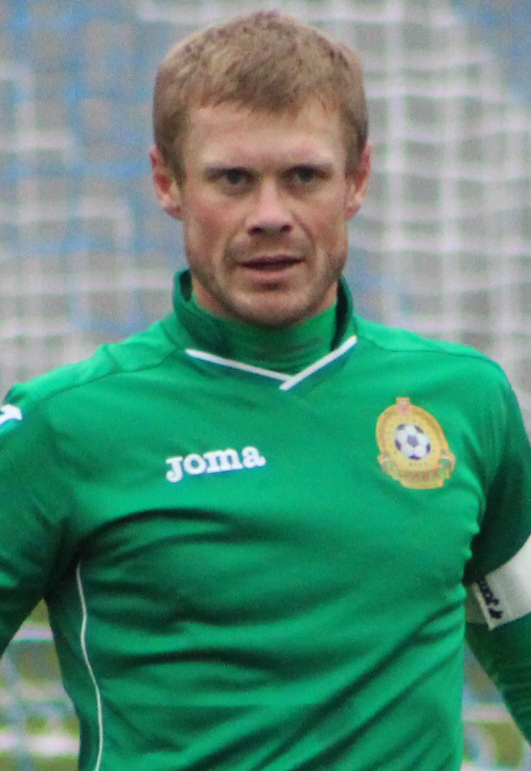

Personal information
- Full name: Andriy Anatolyiyovych Donets
- Date of birth: 3 January 1981 (age 45)
- Place of birth: Volochysk, Soviet Union, (now Ukraine)
- Height: 1.91 m (6 ft 3 in)
- Position: Midfielder

Team information
- Current team: Zbruch-Ahrobiznes Pidvolochysk; Ahrobiznes Volochysk (vice-president)

Senior career*
| Years | Team | Apps | (Gls) |
| 1998–1999 | Nyva-Tekstylnyk Dunaivtsi (amateurs) | 13 | (2) |
| 1999–2004 | Karpaty Lviv | 99 | (4) |
| 1999–2004 | → Karpaty-2 Lviv | 29 | (0) |
| 2001–2002 | → Karpaty-3 Lviv | 9 | (1) |
| 2005 | Volyn Lutsk | 13 | (0) |
| 2006 | UTA Arad | ? | (?) |
| 2006–2007 | Volyn Lutsk | 33 | (7) |
| 2007–2008 | Zakarpattia Uzhhorod | 19 | (1) |
| 2008–2011 | Tavriya Simferopol | 22 | (2) |
| 2009 | → Zakarpattia Uzhhorod (loan) | 14 | (0) |
| 2011–2012 | Chornomorets Odesa | 16 | (2) |
| 2012–2013 | Bukovyna Chernivtsi | 20 | (2) |
| 2013–2015 | Nyva Ternopil | 49 | (0) |
| 2015–2017 | Ahrobiznes Volochysk (amateurs) | 44 | (28) |
| 2018– | Zbruch-Ahrobiznes Pidvolochysk (amateurs) | 46 | (41) |

Managerial career
- 2016–2019: Ahrobiznes Volochysk
- 2019–: Ahrobiznes Volochysk (vice-president)
- * Club domestic league appearances and goals as of 22 January 2022

Andriy Anatolyiyovych Donets (born 3 January 1981) is a Ukrainian amateur and former professional footballer who currently plays for the Ukrainian amateur club Zbruch-Ahrobiznes Pidvolochysk and works as vice-president of the Ukrainian First League club Ahrobiznes Volochysk.

== Playing career ==
Donets moved to Chornomorets from Tavriya Simferopol in June 2011. To Tavriya, in turn, he moved from FC Zakarpattia Uzhhorod in the summer of 2008.
