= Serhiy Ralyuchenko =

Ukrainian footballer and coach (1962–2024)

Personal information
- Full name: Serhiy Petrovych Ralyuchenko
- Date of birth: 13 November 1962
- Place of birth: Kyiv, Ukrainian SSR, USSR
- Date of death: 10 December 2024 (aged 62)
- Height: 1.73 m (5 ft 8 in)
- Position: Midfielder

Senior career*
Years	Team	Apps	(Gls)
1980	Bilshovyk Kyiv	5	(?)
1980	Nyva Vinnytsia	1	(0)
1980–1985	Zirka Kirovohrad	186	(35)
1986	SKA Kyiv	36	(12)
1987	Shakhtar Donetsk	16	(0)
1988	Zirka Kirovohrad	12	(0)
1988–1991	Metalist Kharkiv	83	(8)
1991–1992	Stal Mielec	24	(4)
1992	Stilon Gorzów Wielkopolski	7	(2)
1993	Torpedo Zaporizhia	15	(6)
1993–1994	Temp Shepetivka	34	(3)
1994	Torpedo Zaporizhia	15	(4)
1995	Skala Stryi	11	(1)
1995–1996	Vorskla Poltava	36	(5)
1996–1997	Naftovyk Okhtyrka	30	(3)
1997–1998	Zirka Kirovohrad	16	(0)
1997–1998	→ Zirka-2 Kirovohrad (loan)	2	(0)
1999	Enerhetyk Komsomolske	3	(0)

Managerial career
- 1998–2004: Metalist-2 Kharkiv (assistant)
- 2004–2009: Metalist Kharkiv (assistant, doubles)
- 2009–2015: Metalist Kharkiv (scout)
- 2015–2016: Metalist Kharkiv (U-19)
- 2016–2019: Metalist 1925 Kharkiv (assistant)
- 2018: Metalist 1925 Kharkiv (interim)
- 2020: Metalist 1925 Kharkiv (assistant)
- * Club domestic league appearances and goals

Serhiy Ralyuchenko (Ukrainian: Сергій Петрович Ралюченко; 13 November 1962 – 10 December 2024) was a Ukrainian professional football coach and player.

Ralyuchenko died on 10 December 2024, at the age of 62. He was the father of Andriy Ralyuchenko.
