= Vitaliy Hrusha =

Ukrainian footballer

Personal information
- Full name: Vitaliy Volodymyrovych Hrusha
- Date of birth: 20 February 1994 (age 32)
- Place of birth: Vilbivne, Rivne Oblast, Ukraine
- Height: 1.78 m (5 ft 10 in)
- Position: Midfielder

Team information
- Current team: Bukovyna Chernivtsi
- Number: 25

Youth career
- 2006–2007: Enerhetyk Netishyn
- 2007–2008: UFK-Karpaty Lviv
- 2007–2011: Shturm Kostopil

Senior career*
Years	Team	Apps	(Gls)
2013	Burevisnyk Kremenets (amateurs)		
2014	Velbivno (amateurs)	14	(1)
2015–2016	ODEK Orzhiv (amateurs)	49	(11)
2017–2022	Ahrobiznes Volochysk	129	(28)
2022–2025	Obolon Kyiv	65	(8)
2025–	Bukovyna Chernivtsi	30	(6)
- * Club domestic league appearances and goals as of 3 June 2026

Vitaliy Volodymyrovych Hrusha (Ukrainian: Віталій Володимирович Груша; born 20 February 1994) is a Ukrainian professional footballer who plays as a midfielder for Bukovyna Chernivtsi.

== Career ==
=== Early years ===
Hrusha is a product of several sports schools throughout western Ukraine including UFK-Karpaty Lviv. His first coach was Volodymyr Matyuk.

=== Amateur years ===
In 2013 Hrusha started to play for the Burevisnyk Kremenets in the regional competitions of Ternopil Oblast, later joined a team from his native village that participated in competitions of Rivne Oblast and in 2015 – ODEK Orzhiv. With ODEK Orzhiv he also played in the national amateur competitions. In the spring of 2017 Hrusha joined Ahrobiznes Volochysk, with which he became national champion among amateurs.

=== Ahrobiznes Volochysk ===
He made his professional debut for Ahrobiznes Volochysk in the away match against Prykarpattia Ivano-Frankivsk on 14 July 2017 in the Ukrainian Second League scoring a hat-trick in a 5–2 win.
