= FC Ahrobiznes Volochysk =

Association football club in Ukraine

Ahrobiznes Volochysk
- Full name: FC Ahrobiznes Volochysk
- Founded: 2015; 11 years ago
- Ground: Yunist Stadium, Volochysk
- Capacity: 2,700
- Head coach: Oleksandr Chyzhevskyi
- League: Ukrainian First League
- 2024–25: Ukrainian First League, 5th
- Website: http://fcab.com.ua/
Home colours	Away colours

Former club crest

FC Ahrobiznes Volochysk is an association football club from Volochysk, Khmelnytskyi Oblast, competing in the Ukrainian First League.

== History ==
The club was founded in December 2015 in place of recently dissolved FC Zbruch.

In summer of 2014, former president of Zbruch Volochysk Yevhen Sinkov gave interview to UA-Football and told story about Zbruch and the Volochysk football. A football team in Volochysk existed since 1960s, but its active development started already in 1970s. In 1974 there was a team under name of Mashynobudivnyk Volochysk which sometime in 1976 won the Khmelnytskyi Oblast championship. Sometime in 1980s it was dissolved. In 1989, the city's team was revived as Strila Volochysk and also won another regional title (Khmelnytskyi Oblast Football Championship).

In 1990, the club was known as Zbruch Volochysk and in 1991 again won the regional championship. In 1994–2006 the team was financed by the city municipality (city council) which was presided by Ivan Rybachuk. After that for the next couple of years the team was sponsored by local company Ahrobiznes. In 2008 the president of Zbruch was elected the president of Volochysk Raion Football Federation Yevhen Sinkov. In 2008–2014 Ihor Shyshkin was a head coach of Zbruch Volochysk.

Sinkov also mentioned that Volochysk has couple of sports schools with football sections "Osvita" and "Kolos" which field several youth teams for various age categories in competitions of the Youth Football League of Ukraine (DUFLU). Those junior teams are coached by graduates of the Lviv School of Physical Culture (Lviv UFK). In 2014 Sinkov was mentioning that president of Ahrobiznes Oleh Sobutsky was one of several sponsors of Zbruch.

The new club Ahrobiznes does not lay any claims of being related to its predecessor. Sponsored by a company from the neighboring settlement of Pidvolochysk, Ternopil Oblast, it was officially created as soon as Zbruch was dissolved. The head coach of FC Ahrobiznes became a native of Volochysk and former professional footballer Andriy Donets, his assistant as senior coach became former head coach of Zbruch Ihor Shyshkin, the club's sports director became former president of Zbruch Yevhen Sinkov, the chief of squad became a director of local sports school Vitaliy Kerepko, executive director Vasyl Zabolotniy.

In 2016, the club entered the national amateur competitions of AAFU which was transitioning them from calendar year (spring-fall) to split calendar year (fall-spring). It was a half year competition and Ahrobiznes after winning a multi-group stage by placing first and qualifying for play-offs was able to reach the final but lost it in extra time to defending title champions FC Balkany Zorya from Odesa Oblast. The next season which was substantially restructured the Ahrobiznes first team once again placed first in group and qualified to play-offs. Among notable opponents during this period was the future Ukrainian Premier League member FC Lviv. In play-offs, Ahrobiznes reached finals and with a score 4:0 defeated FC Metalist 1925 Kharkiv which was created soon after bankruptcy of FC Metalist Kharkiv.

== Honours ==
=== Ahrobiznes (since 2016) ===
- Ukrainian Second League
  - Champions (1): 2017–18
- Ukrainian football championship among amateurs
  - Winners (1): 2016–17
  - Runners-up (1): 2016
- Football championship of Khmelnytskyi Oblast
  - Winners (1): 2016

=== Individual Player & Coach awards ===
Top Scorer of Ukrainian First League

- (Ukraine) Ruslan Chernenko: 2020–21 (15 goals)

=== Zbruch (1989–2015) ===
- Football championship of Khmelnytskyi Oblast
  - Winners (9): 1991, 2000, 2005, 2008, 2009, 2011, 2012, 2014, 2015
  - Runners-up (3): 2001, 2010, 2013
- Khmelnytskyi Oblast Football Cup
  - Winners (5): 2010, 2011, 2012, 2014, 2015

== Players ==
=== Current squad ===
As of 7 September 2026

Note: Flags indicate national team as defined under FIFA eligibility rules; some limited exceptions apply. Players may hold more than one non-FIFA nationality.

No.	Pos.	Nation	Player
2	DF	UKR	Vladyslav Krystin (on loan from Epitsentr)
3	DF	UKR	Andriy Zin
4	DF	UKR	Danylo Basovskyi
5	DF	UKR	Serhiy Palyukh
6	MF	UKR	Arsen Sheyko
8	MF	UKR	Vitaliy-Dmytro Teplyi
10	FW	UKR	Andriy Riznyk
11	FW	UKR	Vyacheslav Studenko
12	GK	UKR	Ihor Potimkov
15	FW	UKR	Nazariy Nych
17	DF	UKR	Roman Slyva
19	MF	UKR	Bohdan Kozak

No.	Pos.	Nation	Player
20	FW	UKR	Artem Syomka
21	MF	UKR	Volodymyr Rudyuk
23	MF	UKR	Stanislav Krystin (on loan from Epitsentr)
27	FW	UKR	Artem Nyzhnyk
28	DF	UKR	Oleh Len
30	FW	UKR	Ilya Bezkorovaynyi
33	DF	UKR	Danylo Sydorenko
69	FW	UKR	Oleksandr Starikov
71	GK	UKR	Danylo Khmelovskyi
77	GK	UKR	Roman Pidkivka
79	DF	UKR	Andriy Borovskyi

=== Out on loan ===
Note: Flags indicate national team as defined under FIFA eligibility rules; some limited exceptions apply. Players may hold more than one non-FIFA nationality.

No. / Pos. / Nation / Player	No. / Pos. / Nation / Player

== Seasons ==
Season	Div.	Pos.	Pl.	W	D	L	GS	GA	P	Ukrainian Cup	Other		Notes
FC Zbruch Volochysk
2009	4th (Ukrainian Football Amateur League)	1	8	7	1	0	16	4	22				
2009	4th (Ukrainian Football Amateur League)	3	3	1	0	2	2	6	3				
2010	club in regional competitions										AC	1/4 finals	
2011	4th (Ukrainian Football Amateur League)	2	12	8	1	3	20	12	25		AC	qual.	
2011	4th (Ukrainian Football Amateur League)	4	3	0	0	3	3	8	0		AC	qual.	
2012	club in regional competitions										AC	1/8 finals	
2013	4th (Ukrainian Football Amateur League)	3	10	4	3	3	11	13	15				
2014	club in regional competitions										AC	1/8 finals	
2015	club in regional competitions										AC	1/8 finals	
club reorganized as FC Ahrobiznes Volochysk
2016	4th (Ukrainian Football Amateur League)	1	6	3	2	1	10	3	11		AL	Finalist	
2016–17	4th (Ukrainian Football Amateur League)	1	20	14	6	0	36	5	48		AL	Winner	
2017–18	3rd (Ukrainian Second League)	1	27	23	1	3	70	19	70	1/16 finals	-	-	Promoted
2018–19	2nd (Ukrainian First League)	13	28	3	10	15	17	36	19	1/32 finals	-	-	Relegation play-off
2019–20	2nd (Ukrainian First League)	4	30	19	3	8	52	30	60	1/16 finals	-	-	-
2020–21	2nd (Ukrainian First League)	5	30	15	7	8	46	27	52	1/2 finals	-	-	-
2021–22	2nd (Ukrainian First League)	13	20	4	9	7	16	23	21	1/64 finals	-	-	-
missed 2022–23 season
2023–24	2nd"A" (Ukrainian First League)	2/10	18	8	5	5	20	15	29	1/16 finals	-	-	Admitted to Promotion Group
2023–24	2nd"Promotion" (Ukrainian First League)	8/10	28	10	8	10	27	29	38	1/16 finals	-	-	-
2023–24	2nd"Promotion" (Ukrainian First League)	8/10	28	10	8	10	27	29	38	1/16 finals	-	-	-
2024–25	2nd"A" (Ukrainian First League)	2/8	14	9	1	4	16	13	28	1/64 finals	-	-	Admitted to Promotion Group
2024–25	2nd"Promotion" (Ukrainian First League)	5/8	22	10	3	9	19	26	33	1/64 finals	-	-	-
2025–26	2nd (Ukrainian First League)	4/16	30	16	5	9	36	28	53	1/8 finals	-	-	Promoted to Relegation play-offs of 2025–26 Ukrainian Premier League:Kudrivka 0:0 2:2 (2:3 pen.)
2026–27	2nd (Ukrainian First League)	5/16	10	5	2	3	17	14	17	1/16 finals	-	-	TBD

== Coaches ==
- 2016–2019: Andriy Donets
- 2019: Ostap Markevych
- 2019: Oleksandr Ivanov (interim)
- 2019–present: Oleksandr Chyzhevskyi

=== Current staff ===
- Head coach – (Ukraine) Oleksandr Chyzhevskyi
- Assistant coach – (Ukraine) Andriy Kuptsov
- Coach – (Ukraine) Serhiy Vakolyuk
- Goalkeeping coach – (Ukraine) Taras Hrebenyuk
