= 2017–18 Ukrainian First League =

Ukrainian First League
- Season: 2017–18
- Dates: 14 July 2017 – 19 May 2018
- Champions: Arsenal–Kyiv Kyiv
- Promoted: Arsenal–Kyiv Kyiv; Desna Chernihiv
- Relegated: Kremin Kremenchuk; Cherkaskyi Dnipro; ~~Naftovyk-Ukrnafta~~ (withdrew); ~~Zhemchuzhyna~~ (withdrew); ~~Poltava~~ (withdrew)
- Matches: 294
- Goals: 659 (2.24 per match)
- Top goalscorer: 25 – Oleksandr Akymenko (Inhulets)
- Biggest home win: 5 – Balkany 5–0 Volyn (Round 19); Desna 5–0 Helios (Round 34)
- Biggest away win: 7 – Mykolaiv 1–8 Desna (Round 15)
- Highest scoring: 9 – Mykolaiv 1–8 Desna (Round 15)
- Longest winning run: 7 – Arsenal (Round 8–14) , Desna (Round 28–34)
- Longest unbeaten run: 19 – Arsenal (Round 1–19)
- Longest winless run: 11 – Mykolaiv (Round 7–17)
- Longest losing run: 8 – Helios (Round 27–34)
- Highest attendance: 4,836 – Desna – Arsenal (Round 26)
- Lowest attendance: 0 – Desna – Avanhard (Round 24)
- All statistics correct as of 19 May 2018.

The 2017–18 Ukrainian First League was the 27th since its establishment. The competition commenced on 14 July 2017 when Zhemchuzhyna Odesa hosted MFC Mykolaiv. After the completion of Round 22 on 18 November 2017, the competition entered a winter break and resumed the spring session on 18 March 2018 and complete the competition on 19 May 2018.

== Teams ==
On 21 June 2017, it was announced that 16 or 18 teams would play in the competition. This decision was dependent on the possible withdrawal of FC Stal Kamianske from the Premier League. Due to sanctions, FC Dnipro was relegated directly to the Second League which raised a discussion of a promotion possibly of another club to the First League. In addition in the case of the withdrawal of Stal, Desna had an opportunity to be accepted to the Ukrainian Premier League with another ongoing inter-season case (see Desna vs Veres promotion) leaving the First League with 16 participants. On 26 June 2017, FC Stal Kamianske chose to stay in the Premier League, while at same time FC Balkany Zorya was confirmed as the 18th participant of the First League season.

=== Promoted teams ===
The following teams have been promoted from the 2016–17 Ukrainian Second League:

- Zhemchuzhyna Odesa – winners (debut)
- Rukh Vynnyky – runners-up (debut)
- Kremin Kremenchuk – third place (returning for the first time since 1998–99 season)
- Balkany Zorya – fourth place (debut)

=== Relegated teams ===
The following team has been relegated from the 2016–17 Ukrainian Premier League:

- Volyn Lutsk – 12th place (returning for the first time since 2009–10 season)

=== Location map ===
The following displays the location of teams.

Home venues of teams in the 2017–18 Ukrainian First League.

== Stadiums ==
The following stadiums are considered home grounds for the teams in the competition.

Rank	Stadium	Capacity	Club	Notes
1	Ukraina Stadium, Lviv	28,051	Rukh Vynnyky	Used in Round 24
2	Yuvileiny Stadium, Sumy	25,800	PFC Sumy	
3	Central City Stadium, Mykolaiv	16,700	MFC Mykolaiv	
4	Avanhard Stadium, Lutsk	12,080	Volyn Lutsk	
4	Avanhard Stadium, Lutsk	12,080	PFC Sumy	Used in Round 25
5	Chernihiv Stadium, Chernihiv	12,060	Desna Chernihiv	
6	Central Stadion, Cherkasy	10,321	Cherkaskyi Dnipro	
7	Sport Complex Illichivets, Mariupol	5,500	Avanhard Kramatorsk	Used in Round 25
8	Naftovyk Stadium, Okhtyrka	5,256	Naftovyk-Ukrnafta Okhtyrka	
9	Obolon Arena, Kyiv	5,100	Obolon-Brovar Kyiv	
9	Obolon Arena, Kyiv	5,100	Arsenal Kyiv	Used in Round 23
9	Obolon Arena, Kyiv	5,100	Desna Chernihiv	Used in Round 1 and 3
10	Spartak Stadium, Odesa	5,000	Zhemchuzhyna Odesa	
11	Prapor Stadium, Kramatorsk	4,000	Avanhard Kramatorsk	
12	Skif Stadium, Lviv	3,742	Rukh Vynnyky	Used in Round 12
13	Lokomotyv Stadium, Poltava	2,500	FC Poltava	
14	Yunist Stadium, Horishni Plavni	2,500	Hirnyk-Sport Horishni Plavni	
15	Helios Arena, Kharkiv	2,057	Helios Kharkiv	
16	Boris Tropanets Stadium, Zorya, Sarata Raion	1,854	Balkany Zorya	
17	Kolos Stadium, Kovalivka, Vasylkiv Raion	1,850	Kolos Kovalivka	
18	Inhulets Stadium, Petrove	1,720	Inhulets Petrove	
19	Bannikov Stadium, Kyiv	1,678	Arsenal Kyiv	Used in round of 25
20	Oleh Babayev Kremin Arena, Kremenchuk	1,600	Kremin Kremenchuk	
20	Oleh Babayev Kremin Arena, Kremenchuk	1,600	Hirnyk-Sport Horishni Plavni	Used in Round 24
21	Park Peremohy Stadium, Mykolaiv	~1,500	MFC Mykolaiv	Used in Round 24 and 25
22	Arsenal-Arena Shchaslyve (Note: In Round 1 the official match summary listed the venue as Sports Complex "TsVSM".)	1,000	Arsenal Kyiv	
23	Dinaz Stadium, Lyutizh, Vyshhorod Raion	1,000 (Note: The ground has seating allocation for 1,000 and the pitch is artificial.)	Desna Chernihiv	Used in Round 24
23	Dinaz Stadium, Lyutizh, Vyshhorod Raion	1,000	Kolos Kovalivka	Used in Round 24
24	Zorya Stadium, Bilozirya	972 (Note: The ground has seating allocation for 972 spectators)	Cherkaskyi Dnipro	Round 21 match moved
25	Bohdan Markevych Stadium, Vynnyky	900	Rukh Vynnyky	
26	Education Training Base "FC Poltava", Kopyly	500 (Note: The ground has seating allocation for 500 and the pitch is artificial.)	Naftovyk-Ukrnafta Okhtyrka	Used in Round 23 and 25
26	Education Training Base "FC Poltava", Kopyly	500	FC Poltava	Used in Round 24 and 26
26	Education Training Base "FC Poltava", Kopyly	500	Helios Kharkiv	Used in Round 24
26	Education Training Base "FC Poltava", Kopyly	500	PFC Sumy	Used in Round 23
27	O.H.Povoroznyuk Stadium, Volodymyrivka, Petrove Raion	500	Inhulets Petrove	Used in Round 24 and 26

== Managers ==
Club	Head coach	Replaced coach
Arsenal Kyiv	(Ukraine) Serhiy Litovchenko	
Avanhard Kramatorsk	(Ukraine) Oleksandr Kosevych	
Balkany Zorya	(Ukraine) Andriy Parkhomenko	
Cherkaskyi Dnipro	(Ukraine) Ihor Stolovytskyi	(Ukraine) Oleksandr Kyrylyuk
Desna Chernihiv	(Ukraine) Oleksandr Ryabokon	
Helios Kharkiv	(Ukraine) Anatoliy Seryohin (temporary) (Ukraine) Vitaliy Komarnytsky (temporary)	(Ukraine) Serhiy Syzykhin (Ukraine) Ihor Rakhayev
Hirnyk-Sport Horishni Plavni	(Ukraine) Serhiy Puchkov	
Inhulets Petrove	(Ukraine) Serhiy Lavrynenko	
Kolos Kovalivka	(Ukraine) Ruslan Kostyshyn (Note: After Round 27 Ruslan Kostyshyn announced his resignation from the club but continues to manage the team.)	
Kremin Kremenchuk	(Ukraine) Serhiy Yashchenko	
MFC Mykolaiv	(Ukraine) Ruslan Zabranskyi	
Naftovyk-Ukrnafta Okhtyrka	(Ukraine) Volodymyr Knysh	
Obolon-Brovar Kyiv	(Ukraine) Volodymyr Pyatenko	(Ukraine) Oleh Mazurenko (Ukraine) Valeriy Ivashchenko (caretaker)
FC Poltava	(Ukraine) Anatoliy Bezsmertnyi	
Rukh Vynnyky	(Ukraine) Andriy Kikot	(Ukraine) Ruslan Mostovyi (Ukraine) Volodymyr Mazyar
PFC Sumy	(Ukraine) Serhiy Zolotnytskyi	(Ukraine) Illya Blyznyuk (Ukraine) Bohdan Yesyp
Volyn Lutsk	(Ukraine) Viktor Bohatyr	(Ukraine) Yaroslav Komzyuk (Ukraine) Albert Shakhov (caretaker)
Zhemchuzhyna Odesa	(Ukraine) Dmytro Horbatenko	(Ukraine) Denys Kolchin (Ukraine) Leonid Haidarzhy (caretaker)

=== Managerial changes ===
Team	Outgoing head coach	Manner of departure	Date of vacancy	Table	Incoming head coach	Date of appointment
FC Cherkaskyi Dnipro	(Ukraine) Vadym Yevtushenko	Terminated	8 June 2017	Pre-season	(Ukraine) Oleksandr Kyrylyuk	23 June 2017
PFC Sumy	(Ukraine) Anatoliy Bezsmertnyi	Transfer to FC Poltava	22 June 2017	Pre-season	(Ukraine) Illya Blyznyuk	26 June 2017
FC Poltava	(Ukraine) Volodymyr Prokopynenko	Resigned	4 July 2017	Pre-season	(Ukraine) Anatoliy Bezsmertnyi	4 July 2017
FC Volyn Lutsk	(Ukraine) Vitaliy Kvartsyanyi	Resigned	13 July 2017	Pre-season	(Ukraine) Yaroslav Komzyuk	13 July 2017
FC Rukh Vynnyky	(Ukraine) Ruslan Mostovyi	Fired	11 August 2017	16th	(Ukraine) Volodymyr Mazyar	11 August 2017
FC Zhemchuzhyna Odesa	(Ukraine) Denys Kolchin	Resigned	21 August 2017	12th	(Ukraine) Leonid Haidarzhy (caretaker)	24 August 2017
FC Volyn Lutsk	(Ukraine) Yaroslav Komzyuk	Filed for resignation (vacation)	21 August 2017	16th	(Ukraine) Albert Shakhov (caretaker)	21 August 2017
PFC Sumy	(Ukraine) Illya Blyznyuk	Resigned	31 August 2017	18th	(Ukraine) Bohdan Yesyp	31 August 2017
Obolon-Brovar Kyiv	(Ukraine) Oleh Mazurenko	Resigns	16 September 2017	10th	(Ukraine) Valeriy Ivashchenko (caretaker)	19 September 2017
Rukh Vynnyky	(Ukraine) Volodymyr Mazyar	Mutual consent	12 November 2017	11th	(Ukraine) Andriy Kikot	13 November 2017
FC Volyn Lutsk	(Ukraine) Albert Shakhov (caretaker)	End of interim	30 November	17th	(Ukraine) Viktor Bohatyr	30 November 2017
FC Cherkaskyi Dnipro	(Ukraine) Oleksandr Kyrylyuk	Terminated	1 December 2017	18th	(Ukraine) Ihor Stolovytskyi	1 December 2017
Helios Kharkiv	(Ukraine) Serhiy Syzykhin	Fired	4 December 2017	6th	(Ukraine) Ihor Rakhayev	27 December 2017
PFC Sumy	(Ukraine) Bohdan Yesyp	Resigned	10 January 2018	16th	(Ukraine) Serhiy Zolotnytskyi	28 February 2018
Obolon-Brovar Kyiv	(Ukraine) Valeriy Ivashchenko (caretaker)	End of interim	12 January 2018	10th	(Ukraine) Volodymyr Pyatenko	12 January 2018
FC Zhemchuzhyna Odesa	(Ukraine) Leonid Haidarzhy (caretaker)	Continue as sportive director	22 January 2018	13th	(Ukraine) Dmytro Horbatenko	22 January 2018
Helios Kharkiv	(Ukraine) Ihor Rakhayev	Fired	13 April 2018	6th	(Ukraine) Anatoliy Seryohin (temporary) (Ukraine) Vitaliy Komarnytskyi (temporary)	18 April 2018

== League table ==
Pos	Team	Pld	W	D	L	GF	GA	GD	Pts	Promotion, qualification or relegation
1	Arsenal Kyiv (C, P)	34	23	6	5	59	23	+36	75	Promotion to Ukrainian Premier League
2	FC Poltava (O, X)	34	23	3	8	56	26	+30	72	Qualification to promotion play-offs
3	Desna Chernihiv (O, P)	34	22	5	7	71	25	+46	71	Qualification to promotion play-offs
4	Inhulets Petrove	34	21	6	7	46	20	+26	69	
5	Kolos Kovalivka	34	19	4	11	39	30	+9	61	
6	Avanhard Kramatorsk	34	15	7	12	44	42	+2	52	
7	Rukh Vynnyky	34	14	9	11	36	30	+6	51	
8	Hirnyk-Sport Horishni Plavni	34	16	2	16	30	40	−10	50	
9	Helios Kharkiv (Note: After the season completed, Helios Kharkiv was merged into FC Kobra Kharkiv. Kobra in its turn withdrew its professional squad from the league after playing only three games next season. And the president of actual Kobra admitted that he does not control the team that plays in the First League.)	34	14	4	16	35	43	−8	46	
10	MFC Mykolaiv	34	12	8	14	39	50	−11	44	
11	PFC Sumy	34	12	6	16	30	37	−7	42	
12	Balkany Zorya	34	9	13	12	30	35	−5	40	
13	Volyn Lutsk	34	11	3	20	31	44	−13	36	
14	Obolon-Brovar Kyiv	34	9	8	17	24	37	−13	35	
15	Naftovyk-Ukrnafta Okhtyrka (Note: After the season completed, Ukrnafta (related to the Privat Group) who sponsored Naftovyk-Ukrnafta Okhtyrka decided to liquidate the club since it was a tax liability.) (R, X)	34	8	9	17	27	42	−15	33	Withdrew after the season
16	Kremin Kremenchuk (R)	34	9	5	20	25	54	−29	32	Relegation to Ukrainian Second League
17	Cherkaskyi Dnipro (R)	34	8	4	22	27	50	−23	28	Relegation to Ukrainian Second League
18	Zhemchuzhyna Odesa (Note: Zhemchuzhyna Odesa withdrew after Round 31. Technical losses were adjudged against the team in the last three matches. At time of withdrawal, Zhemchuzhyna's had played 31 matches, with a record of 7 wins, 6 draws and 18 losses, scoring 33 goals and having conceded 54 goals.) (X)	34	7	6	21	33	54	−21	27	Withdrew after Round 31

Updated to match(es) played on 19 May 2018. Source: PFL.ua
Rules for classification: 1) Points; 2) Goal difference; 3) Goals scored; 4) Head-to-head points; 5) Head-to-head goal difference; 6) Head-to-head goals scored; 7) Fair play; 8) Draw or "golden match" (if tied for first).
(C) Champions; (O) Play-off winners; (P) Promoted; (R) Relegated; (X) Withdrew

=== Results ===
Home \ Away	ARK	AVK	BAZ	CHD	DES	HEL	HIS	IHP	KOK	KRE	MYK	NAF	OBK	POL	RUV	SUM	VOL	ZEO
Arsenal Kyiv		2–0	1–0	1–0	1–0	3–1	0–1	3–1	2–1	2–0	3–0	2–1	1–1	3–1	0–0	3–1	2–0	2–0
Avanhard Kramatorsk	1–0		3–1	2–1	0–0	1–1	1–1 (Note: Round 23 matches postponed to a later date)	0–3	0–1	1–0	2–1	2–1	0–1	2–0	2–1	1–0	2–1	6–2
Balkany Zorya	1–3	0–1		1–0	1–2	0–2	1–0	0–1	1–0	1–1	0–0	1–1	0–0	1–1	1–1	1–1	4–0	1–1
Cherkaskyi Dnipro	1–0	2–1	0–0		2–1	1–2	0–1	0–2	0–1	3–2	0–2	0–0	0–2	2–3	2–2	0–3 (Note: Round 34 match (played on May 19) was abandoned after the 54th minute with a score of 2–2 after invasion of the pitch by Cherkaskyi Dnipro fans. According to decision of the FFU Control and Disciplinary Committee of 8 June 2018, for stopping the game due to intervention of fans, Cherkaskyi Dnipro is awarded with a technical loss, and the Sumy team received a technical victory.)	2–1 (Note: Round 23 fixture was rescheduled and played after Round 24)	1–0
Desna Chernihiv	3–3	3–1 (Note: Round 24 match was played without spectators as part of sanctions administered by the Control Disciplinary Committee of the Football Federation of Ukraine due to fan behavior during Desna's home match against Dynamo Kyiv in the Ukrainian Cup Quarterfinals.)	2–0	3–0		5–0	1–2	0–0	2–3	4–1	3–0	4–1	0–0	1–2	3–0	3–0	1–0	3–1
Helios Kharkiv	0–1	3–1	2–1	1–3	0–0		1–1	0–2	1–2	0–1	3–1	2–0	1–0	0–2	0–0	0–4	2–0	3–0
Hirnyk-Sport Horishni Plavni	1–3	1–2	1–0	1–0	0–2	0–1		2–0	0–1	1–0	1–0	0–0	3–2	0–1	0–4	1–0	0–2	1–3
Inhulets Petrove	1–0	0–0	1–0	2–0	1–3	4–0	2–0		4–0	2–0	3–0	2–0 (Note: Round 22 fixture was brought forward and played after Round 18 after Naftovyk-Ukrnafta agreed to move the fixture.)	0–0	1–2	1–0	2–1	1–0	1–0
Kolos Kovalivka	1–1	1–0	1–2	1–0	0–1	1–2	1–0	1–0		4–1	2–2	0–1	1–0	1–0	2–1	1–1	1–0	1–0
Kremin Kremenchuk	1–1	0–3	1–1	1–0	0–1	2–1	2–0	0–1	0–1		2–2	0–2	0–3	0–2	1–1	0–2	3–1	+:-
MFC Mykolaiv	2–3	2–2	0–1	3–0	1–8	1–0	1–0	1–2	1–0	2–0		2–1	1–0	2–1	1–1	0–0	1–1	4–1
Naftovyk-Ukrnafta Okhtyrka	0–0	1–2	1–1	2–1	1–3	0–1	2–1	1–1	2–1	1–2	1–0		0–0	1–2	0–2	0–1	1–0	1–0
Obolon-Brovar Kyiv	1–5	1–1	0–1	1–0	0–2	0–3	0–1	1–0	2–4	1–2	2–0	3–2		0–1	0–1	2–1	0–1	0–0
FC Poltava	0–1	3–0	4–0	2–1	2–1	1–0	4–0	2–0	1–1	2–0	2–0	2–2	2–1		1–0	1–2	1–0	3–0
Rukh Vynnyky	1–0	2–0	0–1	0–1	2–1	+:– (Note: Helios Kharkiv informed the PFL that they would not play their scheduled Round 32 match (scheduled to be played on May 6) against Rukh due to insufficient number of available players. No official decision was ever published in relation to the game, yet in mid of May the tournament table reflected standing as Rukh received an extra victory and Helios received an extra loss.)	2–3	1–1	1–0	1–0	3–3	2–0	1–0	1–0		0–1	1–0	2–2
PFC Sumy	0–1	2–1	1–1	3–2	0–2	1–1	0–1	0–1	0–2	0–1	0–1	1–0	0–0	0–4	1–0		1–0	2–3
Volyn Lutsk	1–3	2–1	0–0	3–2	0–2	2–0	0–1	1–1	0–1	3–0	0–1	1–0	2–0	2–0	2–1	1–0		1–3
Zhemchuzhyna Odesa	0–3	2–2	2–4	0–0	0–1	0–1	1–2	1–2 (Note: Match was postponed until after Round 21 due to Zhemchuzhyna's home ground Spartak Stadium being used for a scheduled rugby fixture.)	1–0	4–1	2–1	0–0	-:+	0–1	0–1	-:+	4–3	

Updated to match(es) played on 19 May 2018. Source: (in Ukrainian)
Legend: Blue = home team win; Yellow = draw; Red = away team win.

=== Position by round ===
Team ╲ Round	1	2	3	4	5	6	7	8	9	10	11	12	13	14	15	16	17	18	19	20	21	22	23	24	25	26	27	28	29	30	31	32	33	34
Arsenal Kyiv	9	4	2	2	1	1	1	1	1	1	1	1	1	1	1	1	1	1	1	1	1	1	1	1	1	1	1	1	1	1	2	2	1	1
FC Poltava	8	3	3	1	2	5	4	2	2	2	2	2	2	2	2	2	2	2	2	2	2	2	2	2	2	2	2	2	3	2	1	1	2	2
Desna Chernihiv	5	12	4	3	7	6	6	4	6	6	4	3	3	3	3	3	3	3	3	6	6	5	5	4	3	4	4	4	4	4	4	4	3	3
Inhulets Petrove	1	2	5	4	6	3	3	3	3	5	3	5	5	5	5	5	5	5	5	4	3	3	3	3	4	3	3	3	2	3	3	3	4	4
Kolos Kovalivka	16	13	8	7	5	4	7	7	5	4	6	6	7	7	7	6	6	6	6	5	4	4	4	5	5	5	5	5	5	5	5	5	5	5
Avanhard Kramatorsk	18	18	16	17	11	9	10	9	10	7	7	7	6	6	6	7	7	7	7	7	7	7	7	8	7	8	7	7	8	8	8	6	7	6
Rukh Vynnyky	6	10	15	14	16	14	15	18	14	15	16	12	12	12	11	11	11	12	11	11	11	9	8	7	8	7	8	8	7	7	7	9	9	7
Hirnyk-Sport Horishni Plavni	14	8	11	13	14	16	13	15	12	13	11	9	8	8	8	9	8	8	9	10	8	8	9	9	9	9	9	9	9	9	10	7	6	8
Helios Kharkiv	2	1	1	5	3	2	2	5	4	3	5	4	4	4	4	4	4	4	4	3	5	6	6	6	6	6	6	6	6	6	6	8	8	9
MFC Mykolaiv	12	16	10	8	8	7	8	8	9	10	10	11	11	11	13	13	14	11	12	12	12	12	12	11	10	10	10	10	10	10	9	10	10	10
Balkany Zorya	17	15	17	10	9	10	9	10	8	9	9	8	9	9	9	8	9	9	8	9	10	11	11	10	12	11	12	11	11	11	11	11	11	11
PFC Sumy	7	6	9	12	13	13	14	17	18	16	17	17	18	18	18	18	16	16	16	13	15	16	16	14	13	13	11	12	12	12	12	12	12	12
Volyn Lutsk	15	14	18	18	18	15	16	13	16	12	12	13	13	13	12	14	15	15	17	15	16	17	17	16	16	16	14	14	15	14	14	14	13	13
Obolon-Brovar Kyiv	10	5	6	6	4	8	5	6	7	8	8	10	10	10	10	10	10	10	10	8	9	10	10	12	11	12	13	13	13	13	13	13	14	14
Naftovyk-Ukrnafta Okhtyrka	13	7	7	11	12	12	11	11	11	11	13	14	14	14	15	15	13	14	15	17	14	15	15	17	17	17	17	17	17	18	17	17	15	15
Kremin Kremenchuk	11	17	14	16	17	18	18	16	13	14	15	16	17	16	16	17	17	17	14	16	17	14	13	15	14	14	16	16	14	15	15	15	16	16
Cherkaskyi Dnipro	3	9	13	15	15	17	17	14	17	18	18	18	15	17	17	16	18	18	18	18	18	18	18	18	18	18	18	18	18	17	16	16	17	17
Zhemchuzhyna Odesa	4	11	12	9	10	11	12	12	15	17	14	15	16	15	14	12	12	13	13	14	13	13	14	13	15	15	15	15	16	16	18	18	18	18

Updated to match(es) played on 12 May 2018. Source: pfl.ua

== Promotion play-offs ==
Apart from a break in 2014, the post-season play-offs in the First League have been actively conducted since 2011. However, the promotion play-offs were reintroduced for the first time since the 2001–02 season. Teams that placed 10th and 11th in the 2017–18 Ukrainian Premier League play two-leg play-offs with the second and third teams of the 2017–18 Ukrainian First League. On 11 May 2018, a draw for play-offs took place in the House of Football, Kyiv. The games were played on 23 May and 27 May 2018.

== Top goalscorers ==
As of 19 May 2018

Rank	Scorer	Team	Goals (Pen.)
1	(Ukraine) Oleksandr Akymenko	Inhulets Petrove	25 (11)
2	(Ukraine) Maksym Dehtyarev	FC Poltava	15 (1)
3	(Ukraine) Oleksandr Batalskyi	Arsenal Kyiv	14
3	(Ukraine) Denys Favorov	Desna Chernihiv	14 (3)
5	(Ukraine) Oleksandr Filippov	Desna Chernihiv	11 (2)
6	(Ukraine) Oleksandr Kovpak	FC Poltava	10
6	(Ukraine) Vitaliy Sobko	Avanhard Kramatorsk	10 (5)
8	(Ukraine) Denys Bezborodko	Desna Chernihiv	9
8	(Ukraine) Artem Kozlov	Helios Kharkiv	9
8	(Ukraine) Ihor Sikorskyi	MFC Mykolaiv	9 (1)
8	(Ukraine) Serhiy Kravchenko	Helios Kharkiv	9 (3)

== Awards ==
=== Round awards ===
Round	Player			Coach		
Round	Player	Club	Reference	Coach	Club	Reference
Round 1	(Ukraine) Levan Koshadze	Cherkaskyi Dnipro		(Ukraine) Ruslan Mostovyi	Rukh Vynnyky	
Round 2	(Ukraine) Oleksiy Moyseyenko	Hirnyk-Sport Horishni Plavni		(Ukraine) Serhiy Puchkov	Hirnyk-Sport Horishni Plavni	
Round 3	(Ukraine) Denys Favorov	Desna Chernihiv		(Ukraine) Serhiy Litovchenko	Arsenal-Kyiv	
Round 4	(Ukraine) Oleksandr Filippov	Desna Chernihiv		(Ukraine) Serhiy Litovchenko (2)	Arsenal-Kyiv	
Round 5	(Ukraine) Yevhen Zadoya	Kolos Kovalivka		(Ukraine) Oleh Mazurenko	Obolon-Brovar Kyiv	
Round 6	(Ukraine) Yehor Kartushov	Desna Chernihiv		(Ukraine) Ruslan Zabranskyi	MFC Mykolaiv	
Round 7	(Ukraine) Yevhen Troyanovskyi	FC Poltava		(Ukraine) Andriy Parkhomenko	Balkany Zorya	
Round 8	(Ukraine) Yevhen Chepurnenko	Desna Chernihiv		(Ukraine) Oleksandr Kyrylyuk	Cherkaskyi Dnipro	
Round 9	(Ukraine) Artem Kozlov	Helios Kharkiv		(Ukraine) Serhiy Syzykhin	Helios Kharkiv	
Round 10	(Ukraine) Yehor Demchenko	Avanhard Kramatorsk		(Ukraine) Oleksandr Kosevych	Avanhard Kramatorsk	
Round 11	(Ukraine) Oleksandr Akymenko	Inhulets Petrove		(Ukraine) Serhiy Lavrynenko	Inhulets Petrove	
Round 12	(Ukraine) Aderinsola Habib Eseola	Arsenal-Kyiv		(Ukraine) Serhiy Syzykhin (2)	Helios Kharkiv	
Round 13	(Ukraine) Oleksandr Kovpak	FC Poltava		(Ukraine) Anatoliy Bezsmertnyi	FC Poltava	
Round 14	(Ukraine) Hennadiy Hanyev	Inhulets Petrove		(Ukraine) Serhiy Puchkov (2)	Hirnyk-Sport Horishni Plavni	
Round 15	(Ukraine) Denys Favorov	Desna Chernihiv		(Ukraine) Oleksandr Ryabokon	Desna Chernihiv	
Round 16	(Ukraine) Kostiantyn Kovalenko	Obolon-Brovar Kyiv		(Ukraine) Valeriy Ivashchenko	Obolon-Brovar Kyiv	
Round 17	(Ukraine) Vasyl Tsyutsyura	Naftovyk-Ukrnafta Okhtyrka		(Ukraine) Volodymyr Knysh	Naftovyk-Ukrnafta Okhtyrka	
Round 18	(Ukraine) Oleksiy Maydanevych	Arsenal-Kyiv		(Ukraine) Serhiy Litovchenko (3)	Arsenal-Kyiv	
Round 19	(Ukraine) Mykola Buy	Rukh Vynnyky		(Ukraine) Anatoliy Bezsmertnyi (2)	FC Poltava	
Round 20	(Ukraine) Yuriy Bushman	PFC Sumy		(Ukraine) Serhiy Lavrynenko (2)	Inhulets Petrove	
Round 21	(Ukraine) Anatoliy Didenko	Zhemchuzhyna Odesa		(Ukraine) Serhiy Litovchenko (4)	Arsenal-Kyiv	
Round 22	(Ukraine) Viktor Khomchenko	Rukh Vynnyky		(Ukraine) Oleksandr Kyrylyuk (2)	Cherkaskyi Dnipro	
winter break
Round 23	(Argentina) Diego Ezequiel Aguirre	Arsenal-Kyiv		(Ukraine) Serhiy Litovchenko (5)	Arsenal-Kyiv	
Round 24	(Ukraine) Mykhailo Shestakov	Zhemchuzhyna Odesa		(Ukraine) Serhiy Zolotnytskyi	PFC Sumy	
Round 25	unpublished			(Ukraine) Volodymyr Pyatenko	Obolon-Brovar Kyiv	
Round 26	(Ukraine) Oleksandr Akymenko	Inhulets Petrove		(Ukraine) Viktor Bohatyr	Volyn Lutsk	
Round 27	unpublished			(Ukraine) Serhiy Lavrynenko (3)	Inhulets Petrove	
Round 28	(Ukraine) Maksym Dehtyarev	FC Poltava		(Ukraine) Oleksandr Kosevych (2)	Avanhard Kramatorsk	
Round 29	(Ukraine) Serhiy Herasymets	MFC Mykolaiv		(Ukraine) Ruslan Zabranskyi (2)	MFC Mykolaiv	
Round 30	(Ukraine) Andriy Yakovlyev	Volyn Lutsk		(Ukraine) Anatoliy Bezsmertnyi (3)	FC Poltava	
Round 31	(Ukraine) Oleksandr Kovpak	FC Poltava		(Ukraine) Ihor Stolovytskyi	Cherkaskyi Dnipro	
Round 32	(Ukraine) Denys Bezborodko	Desna Chernihiv		(Ukraine) Serhiy Puchkov (3)	Hirnyk-Sport Horishni Plavni	
Round 33	(Ukraine) Oleksandr Filippov	Desna Chernihiv		(Ukraine) Oleksandr Ryabokon (2)	Desna Chernihiv	
Round 34	(Ukraine) Denys Bezborodko	Desna Chernihiv		(Ukraine) Volodymyr Knysh (2)	Naftovyk-Ukrnafta Okhtyrka	

=== The 2017 annual coaching laureates ===
The best coaches were identified by the All-Ukrainian Football Coaches Association.

1st place		2nd place		3rd place	
Coach	Team	Coach	Team	Coach	Team
Oleksandr Ryabokon	Desna Chernihiv	Serhiy Lytovchenko	Arsenal-Kyiv	Serhiy Syzykhin	Helios Kharkiv

=== Season awards ===
The laureates of the 2017–18 season were:

- Best player: (Ukraine) Denys Favorov (Desna Chernihiv)
- Best coach: (Ukraine) Anatoliy Bezsmertnyi (FC Poltava)
- Top goalscorer: (Ukraine) Oleksandr Akymenko (Inhulets Petrove)
- Fair Play award: Desna Chernihiv

== See also ==
- 2017–18 Ukrainian First League Reserves
- 2017–18 Ukrainian Premier League
- 2017–18 Ukrainian Second League
- 2017–18 Ukrainian Cup
