= Dmytro Pospyelov =

Ukrainian footballer

Personal information
- Full name: Dmytro Oleksiyovych Pospyelov
- Date of birth: 19 October 1991 (age 35)
- Place of birth: Odesa, Ukraine
- Height: 1.87 m (6 ft 1 1/2 in)
- Position: Defender

Team information
- Current team: UTA Arad
- Number: 60

Youth career
- –2005: UFK Dnipropetrovsk
- 2005–2007: Spartak Odesa
- 2007–2008: Chornomorets Odesa
- 2009–2010: Dnister Ovidiopol

Senior career*
Years	Team	Apps	(Gls)
2010–2011	Dnister Ovidiopol	23	(0)
2011–2013	Odesa	45	(0)
2013	Turan-Tovuz	14	(0)
2014	Real Pharma Odesa	8	(0)
2015–2018	Zhemchuzhyna Odesa	63	(9)
2018–2020	Metalist 1925 Kharkiv	47	(10)
2020–2021	Chornomorets Odesa	20	(2)
2021–2023	Inhulets Petrove	28	(1)
2023–2025	Unirea Slobozia	55	(8)
2025–	UTA Arad	39	(7)
- * Club domestic league appearances and goals as of 6 November 2026

Dmytro Oleksiyovych Pospyelov (Ukrainian: Дмитро Олексійович Поспєлов; born 19 October 1991) is a Ukrainian professional footballer who plays as a defender for Liga I club UTA Arad.

== Career ==
Pospyelov started his senior career with Odesa in the Ukrainian First League, where he made seventy-one appearances and scored zero goals. After that, he played for Turan-Tovuz IK, Real Pharma Odesa, Zhemchuzhyna Odesa, Metalist 1925 Kharkiv, was free transferred to Chornomorets Odesa in August 2020, and was then free transferred to Inhulets Petrove in July 2021.

== Career statistics ==
=== Club ===
As of match played 6 November 2026

Appearances and goals by club, season and competition
Club	Season	League			National cup (Note: Includes Ukrainian Cup, Cupa României)		Europe		Other		Total	
Club	Season	Division	Apps	Goals	Apps	Goals	Apps	Goals	Apps	Goals	Apps	Goals
Dnister Ovidiopol	2009–10	Ukrainian First League	1	0	—		—		—		1	0
Dnister Ovidiopol	2010–11	Ukrainian First League	22	0	1	0	—		—		23	0
Dnister Ovidiopol	Total		23	0	1	0	—		—		24	0
Odesa	2011–12	Ukrainian First League	26	0	1	0	—		—		27	0
Odesa	2012–13	Ukrainian First League	19	0	2	0	—		—		21	0
Odesa	Total		45	0	3	0	—		—		48	0
Turan-Tovuz	2012–13	Azerbaijan Premier League	14	0	—		—		—		14	0
Real Pharma Odesa	2013–14	Ukrainian Second League	8	0	—		—		—		8	0
Zhemchuzhyna Odesa	2015	Ukrainian Football Amateur League	7	1	—		—		—		7	1
Zhemchuzhyna Odesa	2016	Ukrainian Football Amateur League	5	0	—		—		—		5	0
Zhemchuzhyna Odesa	2016–17	Ukrainian Second League	23	4	3	1	—		—		26	5
Zhemchuzhyna Odesa	2017–18	Ukrainian First League	28	4	2	0	—		—		30	4
Zhemchuzhyna Odesa	Total		63	9	5	1	—		—		68	10
Metalist 1925 Kharkiv	2018–19	Ukrainian First League	23	4	1	1	—		—		25	5
Metalist 1925 Kharkiv	2019–20	Ukrainian First League	24	6	1	0	—		—		25	6
Metalist 1925 Kharkiv	Total		47	10	2	1	—		—		49	11
Chornomorets Odesa	2020–21	Ukrainian First League	20	2	2	0	—		—		22	2
Inhulets Petrove	2021–22	Ukrainian Premier League	10	1	1	0	—		—		11	1
Inhulets Petrove	2022–23	Ukrainian Premier League	18	0	—		—		0	0	18	0
Inhulets Petrove	Total		28	1	1	0	—		0	0	29	1
Unirea Slobozia	2023–24	Liga II	28	0	0	0	—		—		28	0
Unirea Slobozia	2024–25	Liga I	27	8	0	0	—		2 (Note: Appearances in Liga I promotion/relegation play-offs)	0	18	0
Unirea Slobozia	Total		55	8	0	0	—		2	0	57	8
UTA Arad	2025–26	Liga I	31	7	1	0	—		—		32	7
UTA Arad	2026–27	Liga I	8	0	1	0	—		—		9	0
UTA Arad	Total		39	7	2	0	—		—		41	7
Career total			342	37	16	2	—		2	0	360	39

== Honours ==
Zhemchuzhyna Odesa

- Ukrainian Second League: 2016–17

Unirea Slobozia

- Liga II: 2023–24
