= 2015 Ukrainian Amateur Cup =

2015 Ukrainian Cup for amateur teams
Tournament details
- Country: Ukraine
- Teams: 32

Final positions
- Champions: FC Hirnyk Sosnivka
- Runners-up: FC Balkany Zorya

The 2015 Ukrainian Amateur Cup was the 20th season of the national football cup competition for amateur teams, which was scheduled to start on August 12, 2015.

The cup holders FC Inhulets-2 Petrove (AF Pyatykhatska) were defeated by FC Balkany Zorya in the quarterfinals.

== Participated clubs ==
In bold are clubs that were active at the same season AAFU championship (parallel round-robin competition).

- Cherkasy Oblast (2): Retro Vatutine, Zoria-Cherkaskyi Dnipro-2
- Chernihiv Oblast: **Yednist Plysky**
- Chernivtsi Oblast (2): Voloka, Zarinok Tysovets
- Khmelnytskyi Oblast (2): Hetman Khmelnytsky, Zbruch Volochysk
- Kherson Oblast (2): **Avanhard Kakhovka**, Kolos Khlibodarivka
- Kirovohrad Oblast: **Inhulets-2 Petrove**
- Kyiv Oblast: Obukhiv
- Lviv Oblast (5): Demnya, Hirnyk Sosnivka, Mykolaiv, **Opir Lviv**, **Rukh Vynnyky**
- Mykolaiv Oblast: Vradiyivka
- Odesa Oblast (2): **Balkany Zorya**, **Zhemchuzhyna Odesa**
- Poltava Oblast: Olimpia Savyntsi
- Rivne Oblast (3): Malynsk, Mayak Sarny, **ODEK Orzhiv**
- Sumy Oblast: Ahrobiznes TSC Romny
- Ternopil Oblast (2): Ahro Synkiv, Nyva Terebovlia
- Vinnytsia Oblast (3): 15 Hromada Rudanske, Patriot Kukavka, **Vinnytsia**
- Zhytomyr Oblast (2): Korosten, **Mal Korosten**
- Zaporizhia Oblast: **Tavriya-Skif Rozdol**

== Bracket ==
The following is the bracket that demonstrates the last four rounds of the Ukrainian Cup, including the final match. Numbers in parentheses next to the match score represent the results of a penalty shoot-out.

Round of 16
Nyva Terebovlya	1	1	2
Rukh Vynnyky	3	1	4
Zbruch Volochysk	1	1	2
FC Voloka	2	1	3
FC Vinnytsia	2	1	3
ODEK Orzhiv	0	1	1
SCC Demnya	0	0	0
Hirnyk Sosnivka	1	1	2
15 Hromada Rudanske	2	0	2
Yednist Plysky	1	3	4
Ahrobiznes TSC Romny	3	2	5
Patriot Kukavka	0	0	0
Kolos Khlibodarivka	1	1	2
Inhulets-2 Petrove	2	4	6
FC Vradiyivka	2	1	3
Balkany Zorya (a)	2	1	3

Quarter-finals
Rukh Vynnyky	1	0	1
FC Voloka	1	4	5
FC Vinnytsia	0	-	-
Hirnyk Sosnivka	1	+	+
Ahrobiznes-TSC Romny	0	2	2
Yednist Plysky	0	0	0
Inhulets-2 Petrove	2	1	3
Balkany Zorya	0	4	4

Semi-finals
Hirnyk Sosnivka	3	+	+
FC Voloka	2	-	-
Ahrobiznes-TSC Romny	1	0	1
Balkany Zorya	0	2	2

Final
Hirnyk Sosnivka	2	0	2
Balkany Zoria	1	0	1

== Competition schedule ==
=== Qualification round ===
Team 1	Agg.	Team 2	1st leg	2nd leg
FC Rukh Vynnyky	w/o	FC Hetman Khmelnytsky	4–0	+/–
FC Nyva Terebovlya	1–0	FC Zarinok Tysovets	0–0	1–0
FC Opir Lviv	1–8	FC Voloka	0–2	1–6
FC Mayak Sarny	w/o	FC Zbruch Volochysk	1–3	–/+
FC Malynsk	2–2 (a)	SCC Demnya	1–2	1–0
FC Hirnyk Sosnivka	4–3	FC Ahro Synkiv	2–1	2–2
FC Mykolaiv	2–3	FC ODEK Orzhiv	1–0	1–3
FC Vinnytsia	8–1	FC Mal Korosten	5–0	3–1
FC Retro Vatutine	3–4	FC 15 Hromada Rudanske	3–2	0–2
SC Korosten	w/o	FC Yednist Plysky	2–5	–/+
FC Obukhiv	2–3	FC Patriot Kukavka	1–0	1–3
FC Olimpia Savyntsi	2–6	FC Ahrobiznes TSC Romny	0–2	2–4
FC Inhulets-2 Petrove	4–2	FC Zoria-Cherkaskyi Dnipro-2	2–1	2–1
FC Tavriya-Skif Rozdol	2–3	FC Kolos Khlibodarivka	2–1	0–2
FC Vradiyivka	4–0	FC Zhemchuzhyna Odesa	1–0	3–0
FC Avanhard Kakhovka	0–4	FC Balkany Zorya	0–1	0–3

=== Round of 16 ===
All games were played on 2 and 9 September 2015, except for the second leg of Demnya-Hirnyk was played on 16 September.

Team 1	Agg.	Team 2	1st leg	2nd leg
FC Nyva Terebovlya	2–4	FC Rukh Vynnyky	1–3	1–1
FC Zbruch Volochysk	2–3	FC Voloka	1–2	1–1
FC Vinnytsia	3–1	FC ODEK Orzhiv	2–0	1–1
FC 15 Hromada Rudanske	2–4	FC Yednist Plysky	2–1	0–3
FC Ahrobiznes TSC Romny	5–0	FC Patriot Kukavka	3–0	2–0
FC Kolos Khlibodarivka	2–6	FC Inhulets-2 Petrove	1–2	1–4
FC Vradiyivka	3–3 (a)	FC Balkany Zorya	2–2	1–1
SCC Demnya	0–2	FC Hirnyk Sosnivka	0–1	0–1

=== Quarterfinals ===
Team 1	Agg.	Team 2	1st leg	2nd leg
FC Rukh Vynnyky	1–5	FC Voloka	1–1	0–4
FC Ahrobiznes-TSC Romny	2–0	FC Yednist Plysky	0–0	2–0
FC Inhulets-2 Petrove	3–4	FC Balkany Zorya	2–0	1–4
FC Vinnytsia	w/o	FC Hirnyk Sosnivka	0–1	—

=== Semifinals ===
Team 1	Agg.	Team 2	1st leg	2nd leg
FC Hirnyk Sosnivka	3–4 (Note: Voloka fielded ineligible player in the second leg and was disqualified.)	FC Voloka	3–2	0–2
FC Ahrobiznes-TSC Romny	1–2	FC Balkany Zorya	1–0	0–2

=== Final ===
Team 1	Agg.	Team 2	1st leg	2nd leg
FC Hirnyk Sosnivka	2–1	FC Balkany Zoria	2–1	0–0

Winner of the 2015 Ukrainian Football Cup among amateur teams
Hirnyk Sosnivka (Lviv Oblast); 1st time

== Ranking ==
Top-8

Pos	Team	Pld	W	D	L	GF	GA	GD	Pts	Final result
1	Hirnyk Sosnivka	10	7	2	1	12	8	4	23	Champions
2	Balkany Zorya	10	4	3	3	14	9	5	15	Runners-up
3	Ahrobiznes TSC Romny	8	6	1	1	14	4	10	19	Eliminated in semi-finals
4	Voloka	8	5	2	1	20	7	13	17	Eliminated in semi-finals
5	Inhulets-2 Petrove	6	5	0	1	13	8	5	15	Eliminated in quarter-finals
6	Rukh Vynnyky	6	3	2	1	9	7	2	11	Eliminated in quarter-finals
7	Vinnytsia	6	3	1	2	11	3	8	10	Eliminated in quarter-finals
8	Yednist Plysky	6	3	1	2	9	6	3	10	Eliminated in quarter-finals

== See also ==
- 2015 Ukrainian Football Amateur League
