= Yaroslav Vazhynskyi =

Ukrainian footballer

Personal information
- Full name: Yaroslav Volodymyrovych Vazhynskyi
- Date of birth: 21 March 1994 (age 32)
- Place of birth: Donetsk, Ukraine
- Height: 1.90 m (6 ft 3 in)
- Position: Goalkeeper

Team information
- Current team: Alians Lypova Dolyna

Youth career
- 2007–2008: Metalurh Donetsk
- 2008–2009: FC Monolit Illichivsk
- 2009: Metalurh Donetsk
- 2010: Shakhtar Donetsk
- 2010–2011: Illichivets Mariupol
- 2011: Shakhtar Donetsk

Senior career*
Years	Team	Apps	(Gls)
2011–2014	Shakhtar Donetsk	0	(0)
2011–2014	→ Shakhtar-3 Donetsk	25	(0)
2014–2015	Sumy	31	(0)
2016–2017	Illichivets Mariupol	0	(0)
2016–2017	→ Illichivets-2 Mariupol	13	(0)
2017	Mykolaiv	20	(0)
2018	Zhemchuzhyna Odesa	8	(0)
2019–	Alians Lypova Dolyna	31	(0)

International career
2011	Ukraine-17	1	(0)
- * Club domestic league appearances and goals as of 27 June 2021

Yaroslav Volodymyrovych Vazhynskyi (Ukrainian: Ярослав Володимирович Важинський; born 23 March 1994) is a Ukrainian football goalkeeper who plays for FC Alians Lypova Dolyna in the Ukrainian Second League.

== Career ==
Vazhynskyi played one match for the Ukrainian national youth football squad. He was called up as a member of the Ukraine national under-17 football team by coach Yuriy Moroz in February 2011, and played one game.

In February 2016 he signed a one-year contract with the Ukrainian First League's FC Illichivets Mariupol.
