= Pavlo Rybkovskyi =

Ukrainian footballer

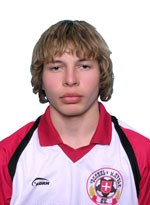

Personal information
- Full name: Pavlo Volodymyrovych Rybkovskyi
- Date of birth: 12 July 1989 (age 37)
- Place of birth: Lutsk, Ukrainian SSR
- Height: 1.86 m (6 ft 1 in)
- Position: Defender

Team information
- Current team: FC Sumy
- Number: 22

Youth career
- 2001–2004: FC Volyn Lutsk
- 2004: FC Dynamo Kyiv
- 2004–2005: FC Volyn Lutsk

Senior career*
Years	Team	Apps	(Gls)
2005–2008	FC Volyn Lutsk	62	(2)
2009	FC Zakarpattia Uzhhorod	4	(1)
2009	FC Spartak Molodizhne	1	(0)
2010–2013	FC Arsenal Bila Tserkva	91	(8)
2013	FC Sumy	10	(1)
2013	FC Bukovyna Chernivtsi	17	(1)
2014–	FC Sumy	0	(0)

International career^{‡}
2004–2005	Ukraine-16	18	(3)
2005–2006	Ukraine-17	13	(0)
2006–2007	Ukraine-18	6	(0)
- * Club domestic league appearances and goals as of 21 February 2014 ‡ National team caps and goals as of 21 February 2014

Pavlo Rybkovskyi (Ukrainian: Павло Володимирович Рибковський, born 12 July 1989 in the Ukrainian SSR of the Soviet Union) is a Ukrainian football defender who plays for FC Sumy in the Ukrainian First League.

Rybkovskyi began his playing career with FC Volyn Lutsk's youth team. Than he spent some years in other teams, but played only in the Ukrainian First League.

== International career ==
He played some matches for Ukraine national youth football teams of different ages.
