= Diego Aguirre (disambiguation) =

Diego Aguirre (born 1965) is an Uruguayan football manager and former forward.

Diego Aguirre may also refer to:

- Diego Aguirre (rugby union) (born 1974), Uruguayan rugby player
- Diego Aguirre (Spanish footballer) (born 1990), Spanish football left-back for Manchego
- Diego Aguirre (Argentine footballer) (born 1993), Argentine football striker for Deportivo Merlo
