= Serhiy Litovchenko =

Serhiy Litovchenko may refer to:

- Serhiy Litovchenko (footballer born 1979), Ukrainian footballer
- Serhiy Litovchenko (footballer born 1987), Ukrainian footballer
