= FC Rochyn Sosnivka =

Ukrainian amateur football club

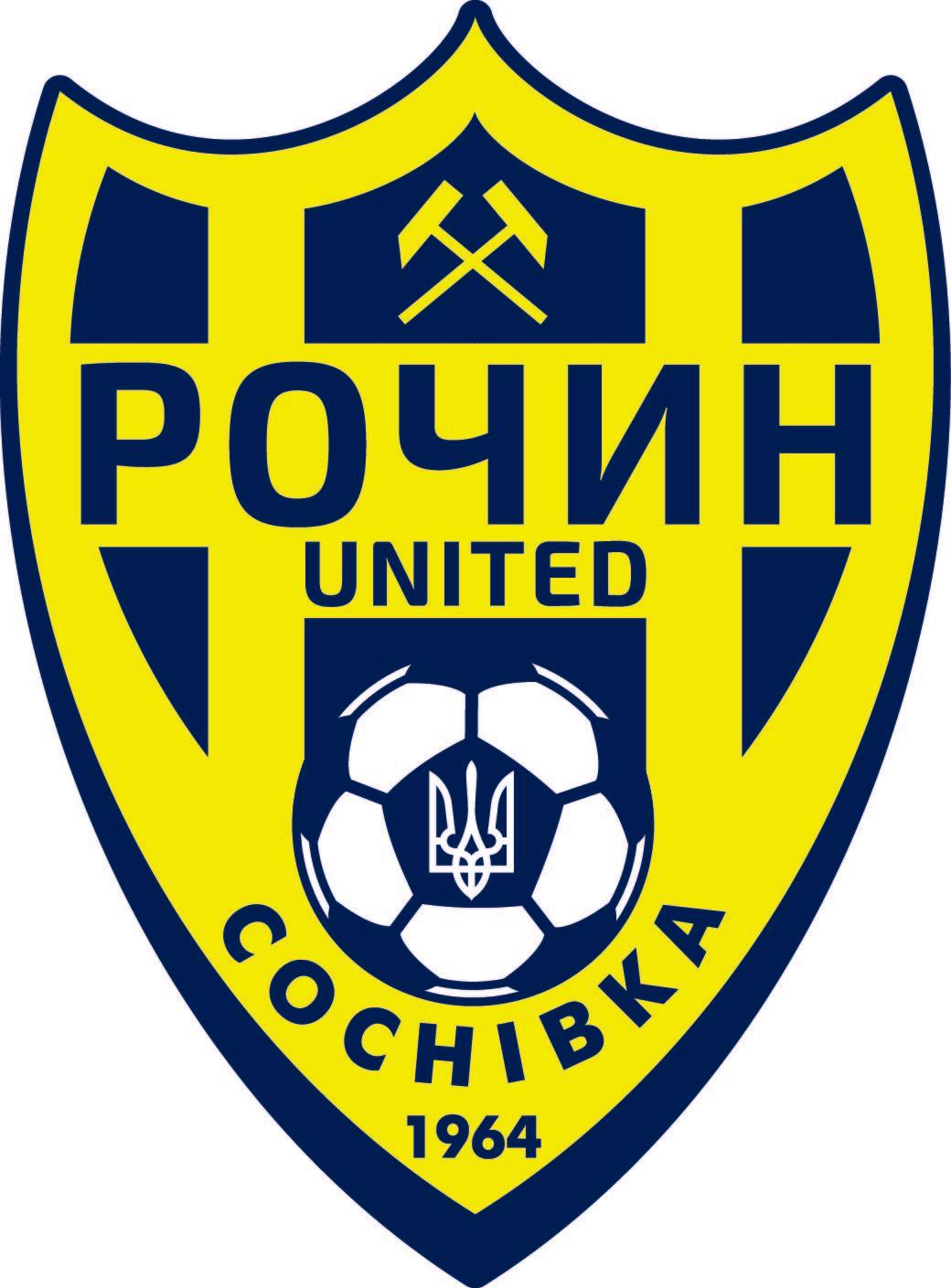
Rochyn Sosnivka

FC Rochyn Sosnivka is an amateur club from Sosnivka (a suburb of Chervonohrad) competing in the regional competitions of Lviv Oblast and Ukrainian amateur competitions.

== History ==
The club originally was founded in 1964 as FC Shakhtar Sosnivka and later couple of times carried the name of Rochyn. In 2003, FC Rochyn Sosnivka merged with former professional FC Shakhtar Chervonohrad (1957–2014).

In 2004, the club was revived as FC Nadiya Sosnivka and in 2006 changed its name to FC Hirnyk Sosnivka.

The club is a winner of the 2015 Ukrainian Amateur Cup.

In 2017, the club returned its old name of FC Rochyn Sosnivka.

== Honours ==
Ukrainian Amateur Cup

- Winners (1): 2015

Football championship of Lviv Oblast

- Winners (2): 2000, 2001
- Runners-up (4): 1998–99, 2014, 2016, 2017

Football cup of Lviv Oblast

- Winners (1): 1998–99
- Runners-up (2): 2014, 2016
