= FC Rukh Lviv =

Rukh Lviv
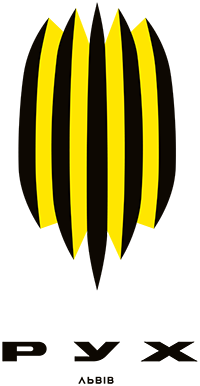
- Full name: Football Club Ruh Lviv
- Founded: 2003; 23 years ago
- Ground: Arena Lviv
- Capacity: 34,915
- President: Yuliya Dumanska (100%); Hryhoriy Kozlovskyi (honorary president)
- General Director
- Head coach: Bohdan Yesyp
- League: Ukrainian Second League
- 2025–26: Ukrainian Premier League, 14th of 16 (withdrawn)
- Website: fcruhlviv.com
Home colours	Away colours	Third colours

Club logo used since the summer of 2016 till the summer of 2017

Club logo used in 2017 – 2019

FC Rukh Lviv (Ukrainian: ФК «Рух» Львів) is a Ukrainian professional football club based in Lviv. The club competes in the Ukrainian Second League as of 2026-27.

== History ==
In 2003 under the initiative Myron Markevych, who was born in Vynnyky, and at the time was head coach of FC Karpaty Lviv established football club called FC Rukh Vynnyky. When asked why Ruhk, Markevych replied that "Movement" (Ukrainian: Рух, romanized: Rukh) is life. In June 2003, a children's football school Myron Markevych "Rukh" under directorship Yuriy Hdanskyi and trainers Roman Hdanskyi, Ihor Didyk, Markiyan Shkraba, Oleh Lehan was formed.

In 2009, the Rukh adult football team with President Hryhoriy Kozlovskyy and head trainer Roman Hdanskyi was formed. Since the team was located in Vynnyky which is a satellite town of the city of Lviv, so at a time teams participated separately in Lviv Oblast League Championship and in Lviv the teams participated in the championship of the city. The club holds matches at the stadium named after Bohdan Markevych (1925–2002, Myron Markevych's father), who was one of the main sponsors of the football club and the Youth Academy, who worked for many years as a junior's coach.

In 2014, the team won the National amateur football championship.

During the 2015 season, the club made sensations by signing former Dynamo Kyiv internationals Oleksandr Aliyev and Maksim Shatskikh.

The club has been admitted to the PFL and took second place in the 2016–17 Ukrainian Second League.

On 26 June 2017, the club presented a new emblem in golden and black colours.

The club were promoted to the Ukrainian Premier League after finishing 2nd in the 2019-20 Ukrainian First League. They spent six seasons in the top flight and withdrew in 2025-26. They will compete in the Ukrainian Second League for the 2026-27 season.

== Honors ==
- Ukrainian First League
  - Runners-up (1): 2019–20
- Ukrainian Second League
  - Runners-up (1): 2016–17
- Ukrainian Amateur League
  - Winners (1): 2014
  - Runners-up (2): 2013, 2015
- Lviv Oblast Championship
  - Winners (4): 2012, 2013, 2014, 2015
- Lviv Oblast Cup
  - Winners (3): 2012, 2014. 2015

== Squad ==
As of 7 September 2026

Note: Flags indicate national team as defined under FIFA eligibility rules; some limited exceptions apply. Players may hold more than one non-FIFA nationality.

No.	Pos.	Nation	Player
7	FW	BRA	Klayver
21	FW	BRA	Tutti
28	GK	UKR	Yehor Klymenko
—	DF	UKR	Bohdan Levytskyi (on loan from Karpaty Lviv)
—	DF	UKR	Volodymyr Yasinskyi

No.	Pos.	Nation	Player
—	DF	UKR	Arsen Zalypka
—	MF	UKR	Ivan Denysov
—	MF	UKR	Mukhammad Dzhurabayev
—	FW	UKR	Dmytro Sebro

=== Out on loan ===
Note: Flags indicate national team as defined under FIFA eligibility rules; some limited exceptions apply. Players may hold more than one non-FIFA nationality.

No. / Pos. / Nation / Player	No. / Pos. / Nation / Player

== International players ==
Had international caps for their respective countries. Players whose name is listed in bold represented their countries while playing for Ruh Lviv.

Ukraine

- (Ukraine) Oleksandr Aliyev
- (Ukraine) Andriy Boryachuk
- (Ukraine) Serhiy Danylovskyi
- (Ukraine) Ivan Kalyuzhnyi
- (Ukraine) **Oleksiy Sych**

Asia

- (Kyrgyzstan) Beknaz Almazbekov
- (Uzbekistan) Bobur Abdikholikov
- (Uzbekistan) Maksim Shatskikh

Europe

- (Iceland) Ragnar Sigurðsson
- (Moldova) **Vlad Răileanu**
- (Slovenia) David Zec

Africa

- (Senegal) Djibril Diaw
- (Uganda) Ibrahim Juma

North America

- (Guadeloupe) **Ange-Freddy Plumain**

South America

- (Guyana) Osaze De Rosario

== Coaches and administration ==
Administration	Coaching
President – Hryhoriy Kozlovskyi; General director – Rostyslav Puzanskyi; Vice-president – (Turkey) Emre Karaahmetoglu; Sporting director – Volodymyr Lapitskyi	Head coach – Bohdan Yesyp; Assistant coach – Serhiy Rybalka; Fitness coach – Oleksiy Dytyatyev; Analytics coach – Kyrylo Bohatyr

== League and cup history ==
Season	Div.	Pos.	Pl.	W	D	L	GS	GA	P	Cup	Other		Notes
2013	4th (Amatorska Liha)	**1**	10	7	2	1	20	6	**23**	-	AC	1/2 finals	
2013	4th (Amatorska Liha)	**1**	4	3	1	0	7	3	**10**	-	AC	1/2 finals	**Runners up**
2014	4th (Amatorska Liha)	**1**	8	5	1	2	17	8	**16**				
2014	4th (Amatorska Liha)	**1**	4	3	1	0	5	2	**10**				**Champions**
2015	4th (Amatorska Liha)	**1**	6	4	1	1	10	6	**13**		AC	1/4 finals	
2015	4th (Amatorska Liha)	**1**	10	8	2	0	15	4	**26**		AC	1/4 finals	
2015	4th (Amatorska Liha)	**1**	3	3	0	0	8	1	**9**		AC	1/4 finals	**Runners up**
2016–17	3rd (Druha Liha)	**2**_{/17}	32	23	5	4	68	24	**74**	1/32 finals	-	-	**Promoted**
2017–18	2nd (Persha Liha "A")	**7**_{/18}	34	14	9	11	36	30	**51**	1/32 finals	-	-	-
2018–19	2nd (Persha Liha "A")	**11**_{/15}	28	8	10	10	35	35	**34**	1/32 finals	-	-	-
2019–20	2nd (Persha Liha "A")	**2**_{/16}	30	18	7	5	51	21	**61**	1/16 finals	-	-	**Promoted**
2020–21	**1st** (Premier Liha)	**10**_{/14}	26	6	10	10	27	39	**28**	1/16 finals	-	-	-
2021–22 was terminated	**1st** (Premier Liha)	**11**_{/16}	17	4	6	7	16	21	**18**	1/8 finals	-	-	began on 24.02.2022 Russian invasion of Ukraine
2022–23	**1st** (Premier Liha)	**11**_{/16}	30	7	11	12	31	37	**32**	—	-	-	-
2023–24	**1st** (Premier Liha)	**6**_{/16}(Best result)	30	12	13	5	44	31	**49**	1/8 finals	-	-	-
2024–25	**1st** (Premier Liha)	**8**_{/16}	30	9	11	10	30	27	**38**	**1/4 finals**(Best result)	-	-	-
2025–26	**1st** (Premier Liha)	**14**_{/16}	30	6	3	21	20	51	**21**	1/8 finals	-	-	**Withdrew**
2026–27	**3rd** (Druha Liha "A")	5_{/9}	2	1	0	1	7	4	3	1/32 finals	-	-	TBD

== Coaches ==
- (Ukraine) Roman Hdanskyi (2009 – 10 Nov 2016)
- (Ukraine) Ruslan Mostovyi (10 Nov 2016 – 11 Aug 2017)
- (Ukraine) Volodymyr Mazyar (11 Aug 2017 – 12 Nov 2017)
- (Ukraine) Andriy Kikot (13 Nov 2017 – 9 Sep 2018)

- (Ukraine) Yuriy Virt (26 Sep 2018 – 13 Nov 2018)
- (Belarus) Leonid Kuchuk (1 Feb 2019 – 10 Dec 2019)
- (Ukraine) Yuriy Bakalov (14 Dec 2019 – 15 Jun 2020)
- (Ukraine) Ivan Fedyk (15 Jun 2020 – 4 Aug 2021)

- (Belarus) Leonid Kuchuk (5 Aug 2021 – 19 March 2023)
- (Ukraine) Vitaliy Ponomaryov (20 March 2023 – present)

== Rukh Lviv reserves ==
=== Rukh-2 Lviv ===
In 2023 Rukh created its second team and was admitted by the Professional Football League of Ukraine to play at the 2023–24 Ukrainian Second League.

Season	Div.	Pos.	Pl.	W	D	L	GS	GA	P	Cup	Other	Manager
2023–24	3rd	**9**_{/14}	26	9	7	10	29	36	**34**			Volodymyr Bezubyak
2024–25	3rd	**2**_{/10}	18	10	3	5	29	19	**33**			Ivan Fedyk

=== Ruh U-19 Lviv ===
In 2020 Ruh created its reserve teams including under-21 and under-19. In 2022 the Ruh under-19 team has qualified for the UEFA Youth League.

Season	Div.	Pos.	Pl.	W	D	L	GS	GA	P	Cup	Other	Notes
2020–21	U-19	**4**	26	13	7	6	49	25	**46**			
2021–22	U-19	**1**	18	15	2	1	49	11	**47**			canceled competition
2022–23	U-19	**1**	30	26	4	0	91	17	**82**			
2023–24	U-19	**8**	30	13	4	13	52	46	**43**			
2024–25	U-19											

=== Ruh U-21 Lviv ===
In 2020 Ruh created its reserve teams including under-21 and under-19. Following the 2020–21 season, the competition among under-21 teams was discontinued and both squads were merged.

Season	Div.	Pos.	Pl.	W	D	L	GS	GA	P	Cup	Other	Notes
2020–21	U-21	**3**	26	15	7	4	60	30	**52**			
