= Hryhoriy Kozlovskyi =

Ukrainian entrepreneur (born 1971)

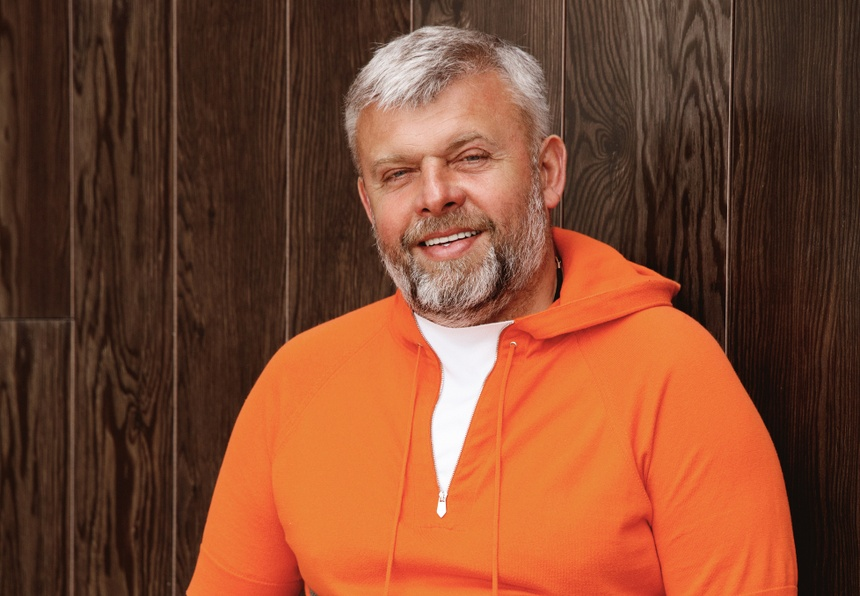
- Born: 1 February 1971 (age 55); Horodyslavychi, Lviv Oblast, Ukrainian SSR
- Education: Lviv Trade and Economic Institute
- Occupation: Businessman
- Website: kozlovskyy.com

Hryhoriy Petrovych Kozlovskyi (Ukrainian: Григорій Петрович Козловський; born 1 February 1971) is a Ukrainian sports functionary, honorary president of Rukh Lviv, entrepreneur and philanthropist.

== Biography ==
In 1994, he graduated from the Lviv Trade and Economic Institute, majoring in "accounting and analysis of economic activity". He immediately started working in the customs clearance department at the Lviv Tobacco Factory (1994-2000), which then belonged to the American corporation R.J. Reynolds Tobacco.

Hryhoriy Kozlovskyy recalls the peculiarities of those difficult times: "During the collapse of the Soviet Union, the corporation faced serious problems with customs clearance of goods. The turnover of goods was very idle, and the factory could lose about four billion (in coupons) because of this." In general, Kozlovskyy, according to him, managed to save more than 2 billion in a month. As a sign of gratitude, the then-director of the factory gave him a $100 bonus and appointed him head of the department of foreign economic activity.

In 2010, he became a co-owner of the company and the director of this same Lviv tobacco factory.

From 2000 to 2004, he worked as a commercial affairs manager at "Vynnyky Tobacco Factory". In the period from 2006 to 2010, he held the position of director of the construction company "Mega Eurobud" LLC.

In 2009, he founded the hotel and restaurant complex "Sviatoslav" in Vynnyky, and in 2013 he became a co-owner of the Lviv hotel "Grand Hotel".

Active public figure, philanthropist and volunteer.

During the Russian-Ukrainian war, he was actively involved in volunteer activities. In 2022, he founded the "House of Mercy" Charitable Foundation, which specializes in providing humanitarian aid to Ukrainians affected by Russia's hostilities in Ukraine. On the basis of the “Rukh” football club, a headquarters for internally displaced persons functioned, and during the days of the open invasion of Russia, Kozlovskyy organized a block post to protect against aggressors. Actively materially and financially helps the Armed Forces of Ukraine. In May 2022, he was awarded the "Badge of Honor" by the Ministry of Defense of Ukraine.

== Sport-related activities ==
Hryhoriy Kozlovskyy is the honorary president of FC "Rukh" Lviv.

In 2009, Hryhoriy Kozlovskyy took under his care the adult and youth teams of the "Rukh" football club in the city of Vynnyky, and actively sponsors and supports its development.

FC "Rukh" became a four-time champion of the Premier League of the Lviv region among amateurs (2012, 2013, 2014, 2015). "Rukh" also became the winner of the Cup of the Lviv Oblast three times (2012, 2014, 2015), the winner of the Super Cup of the region (2013), the winner of the memorial of the most successful coach in the history of the Lviv "Karpaty" Ernest Yust (2012, 2013, 2014). On October 17, 2014, the "Rukh" football club became the champion of Ukrainian football among amateur teams for the first time in its history.

In 2010-2014, Kozlovskyy played for "Rukh" as a football player in the Premier League of the Lviv region. In 2013, played 1 match in the amateur championship of Ukraine.

In July 2016, FC "Rukh" debuted in the second league of the Championship of Ukraine, took second place at the end of the season and immediately won a ticket to the First League of Ukrainian football.

FC "Rukh" played in the First League for the next three seasons, in 2019 the team moved to Lviv and changed its emblem. According to the results of the 2019/2020 season, "Rukh" took second place and won the right to play in the Ukrainian Premier League.

In the 2020/2021 season, FC "Rukh" took 10th place, having scored 28 points in 26 rounds. The following 2021/2022 season was interrupted due to Russia's military aggression against Ukraine, the team took 11th place.

In the 2021/22 season, the juniors of “Rukh” took first place in the Ukrainian U-19 Championship, earning the right to represent the club in the UEFA Youth League. The FC Rukh U-19 team reached the 1/8 finals of the UEFA Youth League, losing to FC Milan on February 28, 2023, with a score of 0:1.

Hryhoriy Kozlovskyy also created a unique phenomenon in Ukraine - FC Rukh Football Academy, the construction of a sports complex which was started in 2018 on the outskirts of Lviv around Lake Vynnykivsky.

The Football Academy of “Rukh” provides training fields of the latest generation: 3 fields with an artificial surface and 5 with a hybrid surface, as well as an indoor arena. It provides infrastructure for finding football players, and for their training and development, including food, training, recovery, and medicine.

Since February 24, 2022, there were about 350 children left in the academy because of the occupation of some cities who could not return home. Due to Hryhoriy Kozlowskyy’s insistence, the Academy took them under its patronage and provided the children with housing, food, education and everything they needed to live.

== Personal life ==
He is married to the Lviv singer Yulia Dumanska, with whom he is raising a daughter, Diana, and a son, Yarema. In total, he has 5 children. In particular, the son Svyatoslav, a professional football player who played in Lviv "Rukh".
