= Oleksandr Akymenko =

Ukrainian footballer (born 1985)

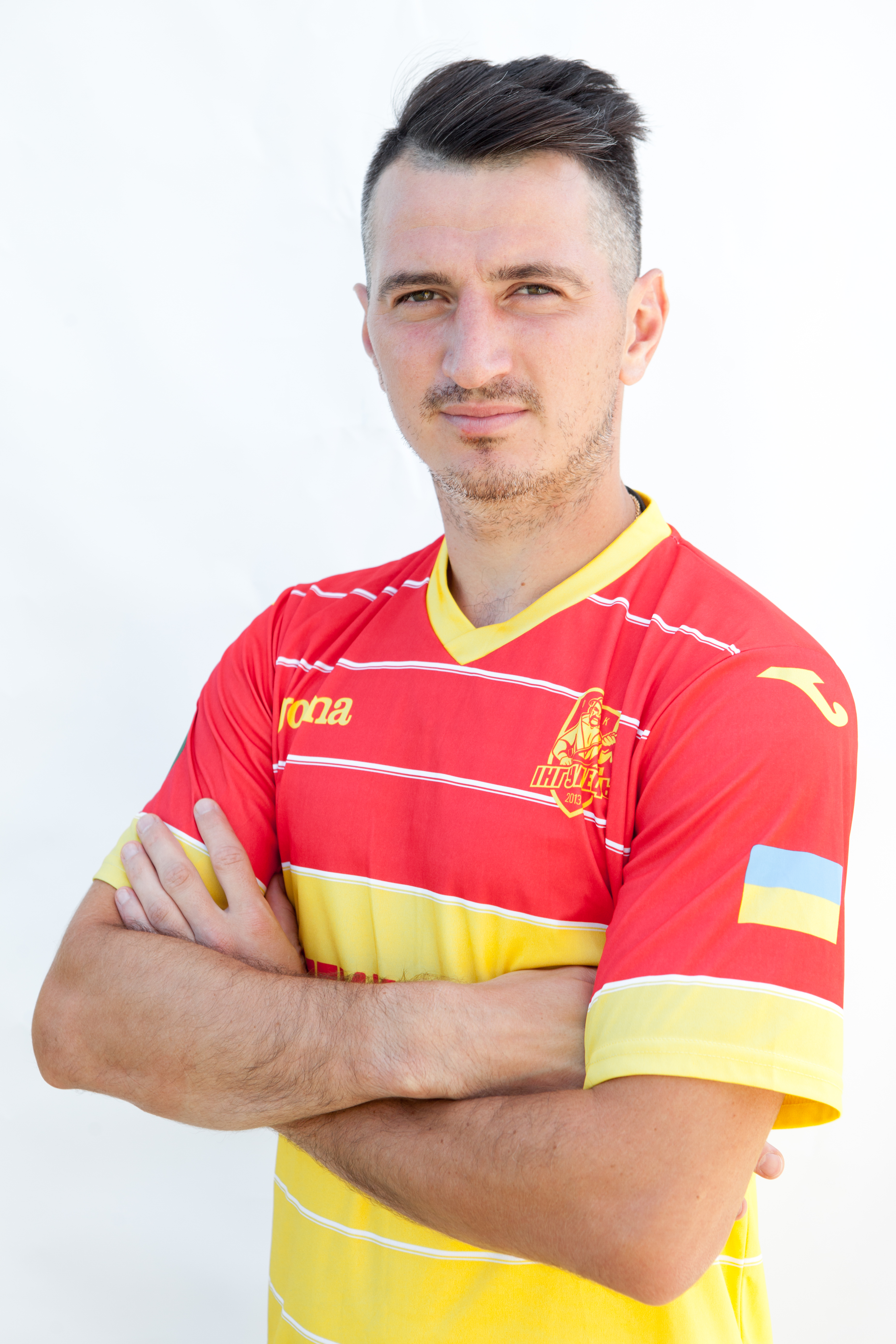

Personal information
- Full name: Oleksandr Oleksandrovych Akymenko
- Date of birth: 5 September 1985 (age 41)
- Place of birth: Antratsyt, Soviet Union (now Ukraine)
- Height: 1.80 m (5 ft 11 in)
- Position: Striker

Youth career
- 1993–1999: DYuSSh Antratsyt
- 2000–2002: LVUFK Luhansk

Senior career*
Years	Team	Apps	(Gls)
2003	Avanhard Rovenky	4	(0)
2005–2010	Stal Alchevsk	102	(29)
2010–2011	Helios Kharkiv	33	(4)
2011–2014	Stal Alchevsk	81	(30)
2014	Metalurh Donetsk	1	(0)
2014–2017	Zirka Kropyvnytskyi	57	(5)
2017–2020	Inhulets Petrove	66	(38)
2021	Livyi Bereh Kyiv	24	(2)
- * Club domestic league appearances and goals as of 9 December 2021

Oleksandr Oleksandrovych Akymenko (Ukrainian: Олександр Олександрович Акименко; born 5 September 1985) is a Ukrainian former professional footballer who played as a striker.

== Early career ==
Akymenko was born in Antratsyt, Soviet Union, and trained at the Luhansk College of Physical Culture football section.

== Career ==
=== Avanhard Rovenky ===
Akymenko began his playing career at Avanhard Rovenky.

=== Stal Alchevsk ===
Than he joined Stal Alchevsk and made his debut coming in as a second-half substitute against Shakhtar Donetsk on 18 September 2005 in the Ukrainian Premier League.

=== Return to Stal Alchevsk ===
In 2014, he became Ukrainian First League top scorer while playing for FC Stal Alchevsk.

=== Zirka Kirovohrad ===
In 2016, along with Zirka Kirovohrad he won the Ukrainian First League and Zirka was promoted to the Ukrainian Premier League.

=== Inhulets Petrove ===
In 2018, as a player of Inhulets Petrove, Akymenko became Ukrainian First League top goalscorer for the second time. On 5 September 2018 Akymenko was honored by PFL and UA-Football as the best players of August 2018 becoming the first player who received the award. On 30 September 2018, Akymenko became the fourth player to score 100 goals in the Ukrainian First League in the 1–0 away win against Sumy.
