= 2015 Ukrainian Football Amateur League =

Ukrainian Football Amateur League
- Season: 2015
- Dates: 29 April 2015 – 27 September 2015
- Champions: Balkany Zorya (1st title) Rukh Vynnyky (losing finalist)
- Promoted: 3 – Kolos K, Inhulets, Myr
- Relegated: 5 teams (withdrawn)

The 2015 Ukrainian Football Amateur League season was played from 29 April 2015 to 27 September 2015.

== Teams ==
=== Debut ===
List of teams that are debuting this season in the league.

- Avanhard Kakhovka
- Tavriya-Skif Rozdol
- Kolos Zachepylivka
- Zhemchuzhyna Odesa
- Mal Korosten
- Opir Lviv

=== Withdrawn ===
List of clubs that took part in last year's competition but chose not to participate in the 2015 season.

- Burevisnyk Petrove
- Olimpik Kirovohrad
- Varvarivka Mykolaiv
- Elektrovazhmash Kharkiv
- Podillya Khmelnytskyi
- Zoria Bilozirya
- Lehion Zhytomyr
- Retro Vatutine
- Mayak Sarny
- Torpedo Mykolaiv

=== Locations ===
Location of participating teams of the 2015 Ukrainian amateur championship

== First stage ==
=== Group 1 ===
| Pos | Team | Pld | W | D | L | GF | GA | GD | Pts | Qualification |
|---|---|---|---|---|---|---|---|---|---|---|
| 1 | Rukh Vynnyky (Q) | 6 | 4 | 1 | 1 | 10 | 6 | +4 | 13 | Second Stage |
| 3 | Vinnytsia (Q) | 6 | 2 | 2 | 2 | 9 | 7 | +2 | 8 | Second Stage |
| 2 | ODEK Orzhiv (Q) | 6 | 2 | 2 | 2 | 7 | 6 | +1 | 8 | Second Stage |
| 4 | Opir Lviv | 6 | 1 | 1 | 4 | 7 | 14 | −7 | 4 | |

(Q) Qualified for the phase indicated

==== Top goalscorers ====
| Rank | Player | Club | Goals (Pen.) |
|---|---|---|---|
| 1 | (Ukraine) Oleh Kalutskyi | Opir Lviv | 4 (2) |
| 2 | (Ukraine) Roman Ivanov | Rukh Vynnyky | 3 |
| 2 | (Ukraine) Viktor Karashchenko | ODEK Orzhiv | 3 |
| 2 | (Ukraine) Oleh Sheptytskyi | Rukh Vynnyky | 3 |

=== Group 2 ===
| Pos | Team | Pld | W | D | L | GF | GA | GD | Pts | Qualification |
|---|---|---|---|---|---|---|---|---|---|---|
| 1 | Kolos Kovalivka (Q) | 6 | 6 | 0 | 0 | 26 | 3 | +23 | 18 | Second Stage |
| 2 | Yednist Plysky (Q) | 6 | 3 | 0 | 3 | 12 | 7 | +5 | 9 | Second Stage |
| 3 | Avanhard Koryukivka (Q) | 6 | 2 | 1 | 3 | 9 | 12 | −3 | 4 | Second Stage |
| 4 | Mal Korosten | 6 | 0 | 1 | 5 | 2 | 27 | −25 | 1 | |

(Q) Qualified for the phase indicated

==== Top goalscorers ====
| Rank | Player | Club | Goals (Pen.) |
|---|---|---|---|
| 1 | (Ukraine) Oleksandr Bondarenko | Kolos Kovalivka | 8 |
| 2 | (Ukraine) Yevhen Shupik | Yednist Plysky | 5 (1) |
| 3 | (Ukraine) Oleksandr Shkolnyi | Yednist Plysky | 4 |

=== Group 3 ===
| Pos | Team | Pld | W | D | L | GF | GA | GD | Pts | Qualification |
|---|---|---|---|---|---|---|---|---|---|---|
| 1 | Inhulets Petrove (Q) | 6 | 4 | 0 | 2 | 9 | 4 | +5 | 12 | Second Stage |
| 2 | Kolos Zachepylivka (Q) | 6 | 3 | 1 | 2 | 11 | 6 | +5 | 10 | Second Stage |
| 3 | Tavria-Skif Rozdol (Q) | 6 | 2 | 2 | 2 | 5 | 7 | −2 | 8 | Second Stage |
| 4 | VPK-Ahro Shevchenkivka | 6 | 1 | 1 | 4 | 5 | 13 | −8 | 4 | |

(Q) Qualified for the phase indicated

==== Top goalscorers ====
| Rank | Player | Club | Goals (Pen.) |
|---|---|---|---|
| 1 | (Ukraine) Oleksandr Mishurenko | VPK-Ahro Shevchenkivka | 4 (2) |
| 1 | (Ukraine) Anton Sharko | Kolos Zachepylivka | 4 (2) |
| 3 | (Ukraine) Mykola Koliada | Inhulets Petrove | 3 |

=== Group 4 ===
| Pos | Team | Pld | W | D | L | GF | GA | GD | Pts | Qualification |
|---|---|---|---|---|---|---|---|---|---|---|
| 1 | Balkany Zoria (Q) | 6 | 4 | 2 | 0 | 11 | 6 | +5 | 14 | Second Stage |
| 2 | Zhemchuzhyna Odesa (Q) | 6 | 2 | 3 | 1 | 5 | 4 | +1 | 9 | Second Stage |
| 3 | Myr Hornostayivka (Q) | 6 | 1 | 3 | 2 | 6 | 6 | 0 | 6 | Second League |
| 4 | Avanhard Kakhovka (Q) | 6 | 0 | 2 | 4 | 5 | 11 | −6 | 1 | Second Stage |

(Q) Qualified for the phase indicated

==== Top goalscorers ====
| Rank | Player | Club | Goals (Pen.) |
|---|---|---|---|
| 1 | (Ukraine) Vadym Hostyev | Zhemchuzhyna Odesa | 2 |
| 1 | (Ukraine) Oleksandr Mukovozov | Myr Hornostayivka | 2 |
| 1 | (Ukraine) Anatoliy Oprya | Balkany Zorya | 2 |
| 1 | (Ukraine) Serhiy Ursulenko | Balkany Zorya | 2 |
| 1 | (Ukraine) Vadym Zlatov | Balkany Zorya | 2 |

== Second stage ==
=== Group A ===
| Pos | Team | Pld | W | D | L | GF | GA | GD | Pts | Qualification |
|---|---|---|---|---|---|---|---|---|---|---|
| 1 | Rukh Vynnyky | 10 | 8 | 2 | 0 | 15 | 4 | +11 | 26 | Finals |
| 2 | Kolos Kovalivka (Q) | 10 | 5 | 1 | 4 | 17 | 5 | +12 | 16 | Second League |
| 3 | Vinnytsia | 10 | 4 | 3 | 3 | 13 | 12 | +1 | 15 | Finals |
| 4 | Yednist Plysky | 10 | 3 | 2 | 5 | 15 | 17 | −2 | 11 | Finals |
| 5 | ODEK Orzhiv | 10 | 2 | 4 | 4 | 10 | 17 | −7 | 10 | Finals |
| 6 | Avanhard Koryukivka | 10 | 1 | 2 | 7 | 9 | 24 | −15 | 5 | |

(Q) Qualified for the phase indicated

==== Top goalscorers ====
| Rank | Player | Club | Goals (Pen.) |
|---|---|---|---|
| 1 | (Ukraine) Oleksandr Bondarenko | Kolos Kovalivka | 3 |
| 1 | (Ukraine) Yaroslav Braslavskyi | FC Vinnytsia | 3 |
| 1 | (Ukraine) Viktor Hazytskyi | ODEK Orzhiv | 3 (1) |

=== Group B ===
| Pos | Team | Pld | W | D | L | GF | GA | GD | Pts | Qualification |
|---|---|---|---|---|---|---|---|---|---|---|
| 1 | Balkany Zoria | 10 | 7 | 2 | 1 | 14 | 10 | +4 | 23 | Finals |
| 2 | Inhulets Petrove (Q) | 10 | 6 | 0 | 4 | 16 | 8 | +8 | 18 | Second League |
| 3 | Kolos Zachepylivka | 10 | 5 | 3 | 2 | 13 | 5 | +8 | 18 | Finals |
| 4 | Zhemchuzhyna Odesa | 10 | 4 | 3 | 3 | 12 | 10 | +2 | 15 | Finals |
| 5 | Tavria-Skif Rozdol | 10 | 3 | 1 | 6 | 15 | 15 | 0 | 10 | |
| 6 | Avanhard Kakhovka | 10 | 0 | 1 | 9 | 5 | 27 | −22 | 1 | |

(Q) Qualified for the phase indicated

==== Top goalscorers ====
| Rank | Player | Club | Goals (Pen.) |
|---|---|---|---|
| 1 | (Ukraine) Vitaliy Prokopchenko | Tavria-Skif Rozdol | 7 (1) |
| 2 | (Ukraine) Taras Lazarovych | Zhemchuzhyna Odesa | 6 |
| 3 | (Ukraine) Oleksandr Mishurenko | Inhulets Petrove | 4 |

Notes:

- On June 19 FC Myr Hornostayivka withdrew from the league after playing one game at the second stage. The Association of Amateur Football of Ukraine (AAFU) expressed its concern over such unconsidered step. The club was replaced with FC Avanhard Kakhovka.
- Inhulets Petrove will continue participate in the finals with its second team Inhulets-2 Petrove.

== Finals ==
The finals were decided to take place in the Odesa Oblast in September 13-19 with group stage matches in September 13-17 and the final on September 19. Teams of Group A played in the city of Odesa (Ivan Stadium and Chornomorets Training Base), while teams of Group B played in Sarata Raion, the village of Zorya (Tropanets Stadium) and the town of Sarata (Sport Complex). Later the final game was postponed and took place in Kyiv instead of Zorya village.

=== Group A ===
| Pos | Team | Pld | W | D | L | GF | GA | GD | Pts | Qualification | RVY | KOZ | ZOD | VNN |
|---|---|---|---|---|---|---|---|---|---|---|---|---|---|---|
| 1 | Rukh Vynnyky | 3 | 3 | 0 | 0 | 8 | 1 | +7 | 9 | Finals | — | 5–1 | 1–0 | 2–0 |
| 2 | Kolos Zachepylivka | 3 | 2 | 0 | 1 | 11 | 5 | +6 | 6 | | | — | 3–0 | 7–0 |
| 3 | Zhemchuzhyna Odesa (H) | 3 | 0 | 1 | 2 | 2 | 6 | −4 | 1 | | | | — | 2–2 |
| 4 | Vinnytsia | 3 | 0 | 1 | 2 | 2 | 11 | −9 | 1 | | | | | — |

(H) Hosts

==== Top goalscorers ====
| Rank | Player | Club | Goals (Pen.) |
|---|---|---|---|
| 1 | (Ukraine) Dmytro Viter | Kolos Zachepylivka | 4 |
| 2 | (Ukraine) Serhiy Zhyhalov | Kolos Zachepylivka | 3 (1) |

=== Group B ===
| Pos | Team | Pld | W | D | L | GF | GA | GD | Pts | Qualification | BZO | ODK | YEP | I2P |
|---|---|---|---|---|---|---|---|---|---|---|---|---|---|---|
| 1 | Balkany Zoria (H) | 3 | 2 | 0 | 1 | 9 | 3 | +6 | 6 | Finals | — | 1–2 | 4–0 | 4–1 |
| 2 | ODEK Orzhiv | 3 | 1 | 1 | 1 | 2 | 1 | +1 | 4 | | | — | 0–0 | 0–3 |
| 3 | Yednist Plysky | 3 | 1 | 1 | 1 | 2 | 4 | −2 | 4 | | | | — | 2–0 |
| 4 | Inhulets-2 Petrove | 3 | 1 | 0 | 2 | 1 | 6 | −5 | 3 | | | | | — |

(H) Hosts

==== Top goalscorers ====
| Rank | Player | Club | Goals (Pen.) |
|---|---|---|---|
| 1 | (Ukraine) Oleksandr Raichev | Balkany Zorya | 3 |
| 2 | (Ukraine) Kostiantyn Parkhomenko | Balkany Zorya | 2 |
| 2 | (Ukraine) Vadym Zlatov | Balkany Zorya | 2 |

Notes:

- Game ODEK – Inhulets-2 finished 1:0, however later the result was annulled and Inhulets received a technical victory as ODEK fielded a player who was not supposed to play due to the number of yellow cards he received.

=== Final game ===
| 27 September 2015 | Rukh Vynnyky | 1–2 | Balkany Zoria | Bannikov Stadium, Kyiv |
| 15:00 | Shatskikh 39' | Report | Zlatov 16' (pen.); Parkhomenko 55' | Referee: O. Derevinsky (Kyiv) |

== Promotion ==
On 11 November 2015 for licensing to play in the 2016–17 Ukrainian Second League applied 14 clubs including FC Balkany Zorya, FC Vinnytsia, FC Nyva Vinnytsia, FC Nika Ivano-Frankivsk, FC Ivano-Frankivsk, FC Kobra Sumy, FC Elektron Romny, FC Lviv, FC Rukh Vynnyky, FC Ahro Pidvolochysk, FC Kryvbas Kryvyi Rih, FC Polissya Zhytomyr, FC Rosso Nero Zaporizhia, FC Podillya Khmelnytskyi.

== Number of teams by region ==
| Number | Region | Team(s) |
|---|---|---|
| 2 | Chernihiv Oblast | Avanhard Koryukivka, Yednist Plysky |
| 2 | Kherson Oblast | Avanhard Kakhovka, Myr Hornostaivka |
| 2 | Lviv Oblast | Opir Lviv, Rukh Vynnyky |
| 2 | Odesa Oblast | Balkany Zorya, Zhemchuzhyna Odesa |
| 1 | Dnipropetrovsk Oblast | VPK-Ahro Shevchenkivka |
| 1 | Kharkiv Oblast | Kolos Zachepylivka |
| 1 | Kirovohrad Oblast | Inhulets Petrove |
| 1 | Kyiv Oblast | Kolos Kovalivka |
| 1 | Rivne Oblast | ODEK Orzhiv |
| 1 | Vinnytsia Oblast | FC Vinnytsia |
| 1 | Volyn Oblast | FC Lutsk |
| 1 | Zaporizhia Oblast | Tavria-Skif Rozdol |
| 1 | Zhytomyr Oblast | Mal Korosten |

== See also ==
- 2015 Ukrainian Amateur Cup
