= Mykhaylo Shestakov =

Ukrainian footballer

Personal information
- Full name: Mykhaylo Serhiyovych Shestakov
- Date of birth: 12 April 1990 (age 36)
- Place of birth: Ladyzhyn, Soviet Union (now Ukraine)
- Height: 1.75 m (5 ft 9 in)
- Position: Striker

Team information
- Current team: SC Vilkhivtsi
- Number: 99

Youth career
- DYuSSh Ladyzhyn

Senior career*
Years	Team	Apps	(Gls)
2010–2013	Avanhard-Enerhiya Ladyzhyn	32	(8)
2011	→ Bastion Illichivsk (loan)	0	(0)
2011	→ SKAD-Yalpuh Bolhrad (loan)	1	(0)
2012	→ Sovignon Tayirove (loan)	11	(7)
2013–2016	Real Pharma Odesa	54	(8)
2016–2017	Balkany Zorya	11	(1)
2017–2018	Zhemchuzhyna Odesa	38	(17)
2018–2019	Nyva Vinnytsia	17	(6)
2019–2024	Veres Rivne	114	(33)
2024–	SC Vilkhivtsi	37	(8)
- * Club domestic league appearances and goals as of 6 June 2026

Mykhaylo Serhiyovych Shestakov (Ukrainian: Михайло Сергійович Шестаков; born 12 April 1990) is a Ukrainian professional footballer who plays as a striker.

== Career ==
He played for several Ukrainian amateur football clubs and then spent time with some Ukrainian clubs that played in the Ukrainian Second League and Ukrainian First League. In the summer of 2021 he prolonged his contract for one year with Veres Rivne that was promoted to the Ukrainian Premier League. On 23 December 2022 he extended his contract with the club until July 2024.

== Personal life ==
He is the twin brother of Ukrainian football player Serhiy Shestakov.
