= Leonid Haidarzhy =

Ukrainian footballer (born 1959)

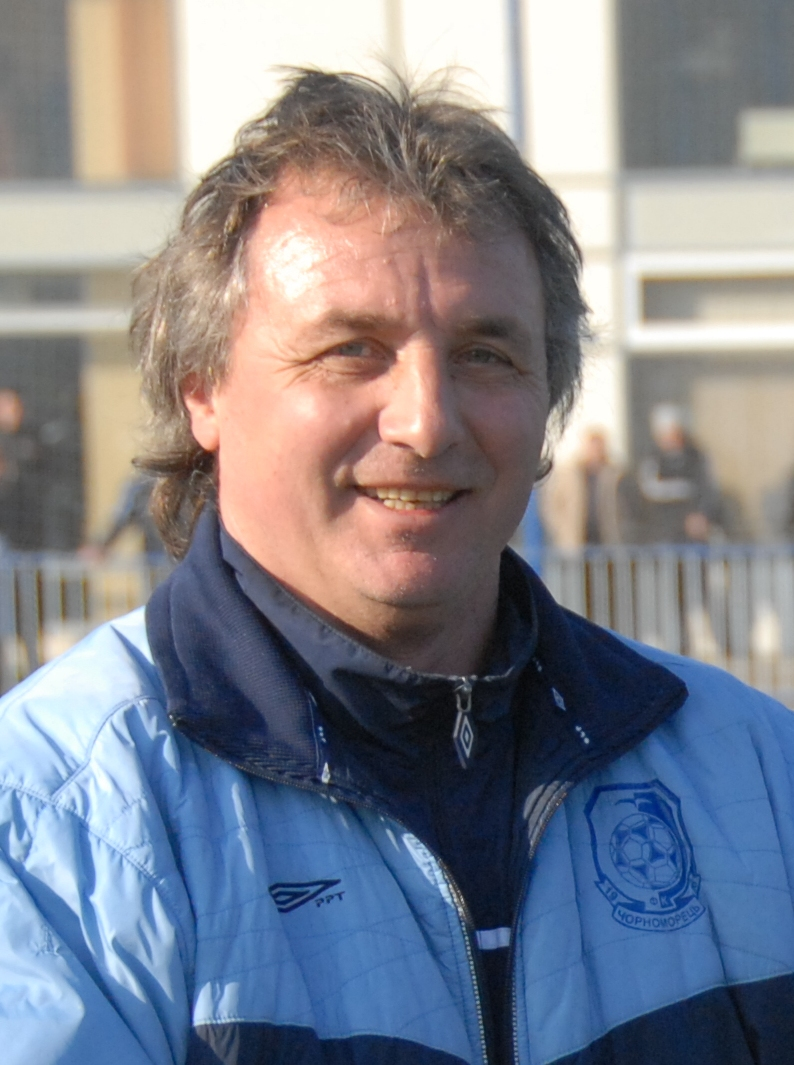
- Haidarzhy in 2011

Personal information
- Full name: Leonid Vasylyovych Haidarzhy
- Date of birth: 20 May 1959 (age 67)
- Place of birth: Dmytrivka, Bilhorod-Dnistrovskyi Raion, Ukrainian SSR
- Position: Defender

Youth career
- 1980–1983: Chornomorets Odesa

Senior career*
| Years | Team | Apps | (Gls) |
| 1982 | SKA Odesa | 6 | (0) |
| 1982–1985 | Krystal Kherson | 126 | (23) |
| 1986–1988 | Chornomorets Odesa | 45 | (0) |
| 1989 | Tavriya Simferopol | 36 | (0) |
| 1990–1992 | Krystal Kherson | 104 | (21) |
| 1993–1996 | Nyva Vinnytsia | 134 | (16) |
| 1997 | Metalurh Zaporizhzhia | 7 | (0) |
| 1997–1998 | Desna Chernihiv | 24 | (1) |

Managerial career
- 1992: Krystal Kherson (caretaker)
- 1992–1996: Nyva Vinnytsia (assistant)
- 1997–1998: Desna Chernihiv (assistant)
- 1998: Nyva Vinnytsia (caretaker)
- 1999–2000: Vinnytsia
- 2000–2001: Zirka Kirovohrad (assistant)
- 2001–2004: Chornomorets Odesa (assistant)
- 2002: Chornomorets Odesa
- 2005: Zorya Luhansk (assistant)
- 2005–2007: Mykolaiv
- 2008: Chornomorets Odesa (academy)
- 2008–2014: Chornomorets Odesa (academy director)
- 2014–2018: Zhemchuzhyna Odesa (sporting director)
- 2017–2018: Zhemchuzhyna Odesa (caretaker)
- * Club domestic league appearances and goals

Leonid Vasylyovych Haidarzhy (Ukrainian: Леонід Васильович Гайдаржи; born 20 May 1959) is a Ukrainian football manager and former player.
