= Andriy Kikot =

Ukrainian football player and manager

Personal information
- Full name: Andriy Yaroslavovych Kikot
- Date of birth: 17 June 1984 (age 42)
- Place of birth: Lviv, Ukrainian SSR, Soviet Union
- Height: 1.80 m (5 ft 11 in)
- Position: Midfielder

Team information
- Current team: Rukh Vynnyky (assistant)

Youth career
- 1999–2001: Karpaty Lviv
- 2001: Volyn Lutsk

Senior career*
Years	Team	Apps	(Gls)
2002–2005	Karpaty Lviv	6	(0)
2002–2005	→ Karpaty-2 Lviv	66	(6)
2002–2004	→ Halychyna-Karpaty Lviv	22	(2)
2005–2006	Enerhetyk Burshtyn	43	(10)
2007–2010	Naftovyk-Ukrnafta Okhtyrka	80	(6)
2010	Lviv	12	(3)
2011–2012	Helios Kharkiv	33	(2)
2012	Arsenal Bila Tserkva	12	(0)
2013	Nyva Ternopil	21	(1)
2014–2017	Rukh Vynnyky	88	(12)

Managerial career
- 2017: Rukh Vynnyky (assistant)
- 2017–2018: Rukh Vynnyky
- 2018–: Rukh Vynnyky (assistant)
- * Club domestic league appearances and goals as of 11 September 2018

Andriy Kikot (Ukrainian: Андрій Ярославович Кікоть; born 17 June 1984) is a retired Ukrainian football player and former manager of Rukh Vynnyky.
