= Bohdan Yesyp =

Ukrainian footballer

Personal information
- Full name: Bohdan Borysovych Yesyp
- Date of birth: 2 August 1978 (age 48)
- Place of birth: Drohobych, Ukrainian SSR, Soviet Union
- Height: 1.74 m (5 ft 9 in)
- Position: Forward

Youth career
- DYSSh Drohobych

Senior career*
| Years | Team | Apps | (Gls) |
| 1995–1996 | FC Dynamo-2 Kyiv | 17 | (2) |
| 1996 | FC Dynamo-3 Kyiv | 1 | (0) |
| 1996–1997 | FC Dynamo-2 Kyiv | 37 | (6) |
| 1997–1998 | FC Dynamo-3 Kyiv | 31 | (14) |
| 1998 | FC Dynamo-2 Kyiv | 15 | (3) |
| 1998–1999 | FC Zirka Kirovohrad | 14 | (2) |
| 1999 | → FC Zirka-2 Kirovohrad | 2 | (0) |
| 1999 | FC Rostselmash Rostov-on-Don | 1 | (0) |
| 1999 | → FC Rostselmash-2 Rostov-on-Don | 24 | (9) |
| 1999–2000 | FC Zirka Kirovohrad | 11 | (0) |
| 2000 | → FC Zirka-2 Kirovohrad | 2 | (1) |
| 2000 | FC Karpaty Lviv | 13 | (2) |
| 2000 | → FC Karpaty-2 Lviv | 4 | (2) |
| 2001 | FC Zakarpattia Uzhhorod | 24 | (6) |
| 2002–2011 | FC Naftovyk-Ukrnafta Okhtyrka | 162 | (61) |
| 2011–2012 | FC Krymteplytsia Molodizhne | 33 | (7) |
| 2012–2013 | FC Sumy | 25 | (6) |
| 2013 | FC Olimpik Donetsk | 15 | (1) |
| 2014 | FC Elektrovazhmash Kharkiv (amateurs) | 7 | (3) |
| 2015 | TSK Ahrobiznes Romny (amateurs) | 1 | (0) |
| 2015 | FC Chayka Deykalivka (amateurs) | 8 | (1) |

Managerial career
- 2016: Sumy (assistant)
- 2016–2017: Veres Rivne (assistant)
- 2017–2018: Sumy
- 2026–: Rukh Lviv
- * Club domestic league appearances and goals

Bohdan Borysovych Yesyp (Ukrainian: Богдан Борисович Єсип; born 2 August 1978) is a Ukrainian retired football forward and current football manager.
