= Serhiy Zolotnytskyi =

Ukrainian footballer (born 1962)

Personal information
- Full name: Serhiy Yuriyovych Zolotnytskyi
- Date of birth: 9 January 1962 (age 64)
- Place of birth: Donetsk, Ukrainian SSR
- Height: 1.82 m (6 ft 0 in)
- Position: Goalkeeper

Youth career
- 1977–1981: Shakhtar Donetsk

Senior career*
Years	Team	Apps	(Gls)
1982	Shakhtar Donetsk	9	(0)
1983–1984	SKA Kyiv	27	(0)
1985	Kolos Nikopol	29	(0)
1986–1988	Shakhtar Donetsk	50	(0)
1989–1990	Zorya Luhansk	94	(0)
1991	Nyva Vinnytsia	22	(0)
1992	Wisłoka Dębica	10	(0)
1992	Temp Shepetivka	0	(0)
1992	Kremin Kremenchuk	5	(0)
1993	Vorskla Poltava	10	(4)
1993	Etar Veliko Tarnovo	5	(0)
1994	Shakhtar Snizhne	11	(0)
1994	Bazhanovets Makiivka	18	(0)
1994	Shakhtar-2 Donetsk	12	(0)
1995–1996	Zirka-NIBAS Kirovohrad	15	(0)
1997–1998	Shakhtar Makiivka	28	(0)

Managerial career
- 1998: Shakhtar Makiivka (assistant)
- 1999–2003: Metalurh Donetsk (goalkeeping coach)
- 2004–2005: Stal Dniprodzerzhynsk (goalkeeping coach)
- 2005–2006: Metalurh Donetsk (goalkeeping coach)
- 2006–2007: Helios Kharkiv (goalkeeping coach)
- 2007–2008: Zimbru Chișinău (goalkeeping coach)
- 2009: Arsenal Kyiv (goalkeeping coach)
- 2009–2011: Krymteplytsia Molodizhne (goalkeeping coach)
- 2011–2012: Hoverla-Zakarpattia Uzhhorod (goalkeeping coach)
- 2013–2014: Karpaty Lviv (goalkeeping coach)
- 2015–2016: Metalist Kharkiv (goalkeeping coach)
- 2016–2017: Illichivets Mariupol (goalkeeping coach)
- 2018: Sumy
- * Club domestic league appearances and goals

Serhiy Yuriyovych Zolotnytskyi (Ukrainian: Сергій Юрійович Золотницький; born 9 January 1962) is a Ukrainian football coach and a former player. Last club he managed was PFC Sumy.

== Honours ==
Chornomorets Odessa

- Soviet Cup finals: 1985-86
