= Anatoliy Seryohin =

Ukrainian footballer and manager

Personal information
- Full name: Anatoliy Yuriyovych Seryohin
- Date of birth: 26 March 1972 (age 54)
- Place of birth: Kharkiv, Ukrainian SSR
- Position: Defender

Senior career*
Years	Team	Apps	(Gls)
1990	Tsementnyk Balakliia	?	(?)
1993–1994	Avanhard Merefa	15	(1)
1994–1996	Metalist Kharkiv	73	(2)
1994–1996	→ Avanhard Merefa (loan)	14	(0)
1997	Astana Akmola	7	(0)
1997	Shakhtyor Soligorsk	4	(0)
1998–1999	Arsenal Kharkiv	5	(0)
2015	Start Chuhuiv	21	(0)

Managerial career
- 2000s: Arsenal Kharkiv academy (coach)
- 2009–2014: Metalist Kharkiv academy (coach)
- 2014–2015: Metalist Kharkiv double/U-19
- 2016–: Helios–Akademiya Kharkiv
- 2018–: Helios Kharkiv
- * Club domestic league appearances and goals

Anatoliy Seryohin (Ukrainian: Анатолій Юрійович Серьогін; born 26 March 1972) is a football manager and former player.

He played for FC Metalist Kharkiv, FC Avanhard Merefa and FC Start Chuhuiv, and he coached several junior teams of FC Metalist Kharkiv, FC Arsenal Kharkiv, FC Helios Kharkiv.
