= Ruslan Mostovyi =

Ukrainian footballer and coach (1974–2021)

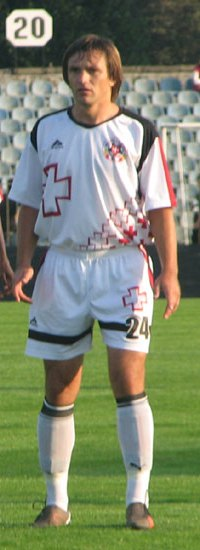
- Mostovyi in 2009

Personal information
- Date of birth: 2 June 1974
- Place of birth: Lviv, Ukrainian SSR, Soviet Union
- Date of death: 26 November 2021 (aged 47)
- Place of death: Stryi Raion, Lviv Oblast, Ukraine
- Height: 1.82 m (6 ft 0 in)
- Position: Defender

Youth career
- LGUFK Lviv

Senior career*
Years	Team	Apps	(Gls)
1991	Karpaty Kamianka-Buzka	10	(0)
1992–1993	Avanhard Zhydachiv	14	(1)
1993	Lviv	10	(0)
1994–1996	Avanhard Zhydachiv	69	(2)
1996–1998	Prykarpattya Ivano-Frankivsk	54	(1)
1997	→ Krystal Chortkiv (loan)	4	(1)
1997	→ Tysmenytsia (loan)	1	(0)
1999–2000	Podillya Khmelnytskyi	30	(0)
2000	Tekhno-Centre Rohatyn	20	(3)
2001–2006	Spartak Nalchik	196	(3)
2007	Tom Tomsk	22	(0)
2008–2009	Prykarpattya Ivano-Frankivsk	13	(2)
2009–2010	Volyn Lutsk	26	(2)
2010	Zakarpattia Uzhhorod	2	(0)
2010–2011	Enerhetyk Burshtyn	27	(3)
2011–2012	Lviv	12	(0)
2012	Rukh Vynnyky	6	(0)
2013	Zorya Horodyslavychi	19	(1)
2014	Avanhard Zhydachiv	17	(0)
Total		552	(19)

Managerial career
- 2014–2015: LGUFK Lviv
- 2015: Mykolaiv (assistant)
- 2016: Lviv (assistant)
- 2016–2017: Rukh Vynnyky
- 2017: Rukh Vynnyky (assistant)
- 2020–2021: Prykarpattia Ivano-Frankivsk
- * Club domestic league appearances and goals

Ruslan Mostovyi (Ukrainian: Руслан Іванович Мостовий; 2 June 1974 – 26 November 2021) was a Ukrainian professional football coach and player.

He was killed in a traffic accident in Stryi Raion.
