= Kostiantyn Kovalenko =

Ukrainian footballer (born 1986)

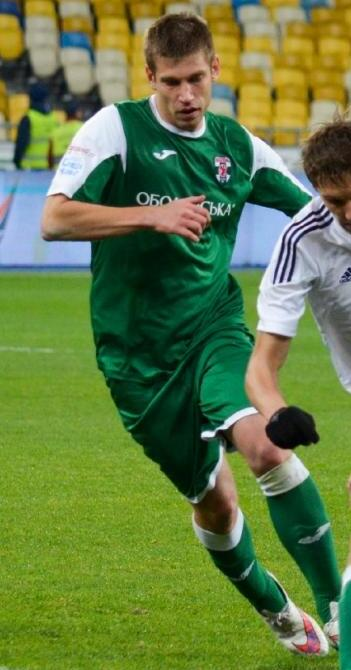
- Kostiantyn Kovalenko playing for Obolon-Brovar Kyiv in 2015

Personal information
- Full name: Kostiantyn Petrovych Kovalenko
- Date of birth: 5 December 1986 (age 39)
- Place of birth: Ukrainian SSR
- Height: 1.82 m (6 ft 0 in)
- Position: Defender

Team information
- Current team: Obolon-Brovar Kyiv

Youth career
- 2000–2003: Sports School Zmina Kyiv

Senior career*
Years	Team	Apps	(Gls)
2003–2009	Obolon Kyiv	67	(4)
2003–2009	→ Obolon-2 Kyiv (loan)	54	(1)
2009–2012	Arsenal Bila Tserkva	96	(1)
2013–2014	Stal Dniprodzerzhynsk	40	(11)
2014–	Obolon-Brovar Kyiv	84	(13)

International career
2003–2005	Ukraine U-19	12	(0)
- * Club domestic league appearances and goals as of 11 October 2017

Kostiantyn Kovalenko (Ukrainian: Костянтин Петрович Коваленко; born 5 December 1986) is a Ukrainian football defender who plays for FC Obolon-Brovar Kyiv.

== Career ==
Kovalenko is a product of the Obolon Kyiv sportive school systems "Zmina".

He spent his career as a player in a lower Ukrainian football leagues. In March 2014 he signed a contract with the Obolon's phoenix club FC Obolon-Brovar in the Ukrainian First League.
