= Yaroslav Komzyuk =

Ukrainian footballer

Personal information
- Full name: Yaroslav Vasylyovych Komzyuk
- Date of birth: 21 December 1970 (age 55)
- Place of birth: Lutsk, USSR
- Position: Midfielder

Youth career
- 1983?: Elektryk Lutsk

Senior career*
Years	Team	Apps	(Gls)
1994	Shakhta N9 Novovolynsk	5	(0)
1994	Pidshypnyk Lutsk	2	(0)
1994	Volyn Lutsk	7	(0)
1994–1997	Khimik Zhytomyr	103	(6)
1997–1999	Volyn Lutsk	85	(0)
2000	Liepājas Metalurgs	20	(1)
2001–2003	Volyn Lutsk	64	(1)
2007–2008	ODEK Orzhiv	29	(1)
2016	FC Lutsk	7	(0)

Managerial career
- 2013–2017: Volyn Lutsk (assistant)
- 2017: Volyn Lutsk
- 2018–2019: ODEK Orzhiv
- 2020–: Volyn Lutsk (assistant)
- * Club domestic league appearances and goals

Yaroslav Vasylyovych Komzyuk (Ukrainian: Ярослав Васильович Комзюк, born 21 December 1970 in Lutsk, Ukrainian SSR) is a professional Ukrainian football coach and a former midfielder. He is currently an assistant manager of Volyn Lutsk
