= FC Balkany Zorya =

FC Balkany
- Full name: Football Club Balkany
- Founded: 2007
- Dissolved: 2022
- Ground: Boris Tropanets Stadium
- Capacity: 1,600
- Chairman: Radoslav Zlatov
- Head Coach: Denys Kolchin
- League: Ukrainian Second League
- 2019–20: First League, 14th (relegated)
- Website: http://fcbalkans.com.ua
Home colours	Away colours

FC Balkany Zorya (Ukrainian: ФК Балкани Зоря, romanized: FK Balkany Zorya) is a professional Ukrainian football team that is based in the village of Zorya, Bilhorod-Dnistrovskyi Raion in the region of Budjak, Odesa Oblast.

== History ==
Old logo of FC Balkany

Old logo of FC Balkany

The club was founded in 2007 as FC Zorya in the ethnically Bulgarian village of Zorya that was founded in 1831 by resettlers from Bulgaria which is located on the Balkan Peninsula.

In the first year of the founding of the club managed to take second place in the championship of Sarata Raion. Between 2008–2011, Balkany became Champions of the Raion, also winning the cup and tournaments. In 2011, the team Odesa Oblast cup with the winning goal was scored by Oleksandr Raychev thereby winning the right to build a stadium in the urban-type settlement of Sarata. The following year began the construction of the stadium with two standard fields with grass. The ground is now named after former footballer from Zorya Boris Tropaneț as the Borys Tropanets Stadium.

In 2013, the team for the first time in its history, won the championship of Odesa Oblast Championship, and in 2014 made their debut in the Ukrainian Football Amateur League.

Two years later in 2015, became the fourth in the history of the club of Odesa region (after the FC Odesa, FC Ivan Odesa and FC Bastion Chornomorsk) to become amateur champions of Ukraine. Also the club was the runners-up in the 2015 Ukrainian Amateur Cup.

The club qualified for the domestic 2015–16 Ukrainian Cup. In the Preliminary Round, the club defeated Skala Stryi and in the next round lost 1–0 on a late goal to Ukrainian Premier League club FC Dnipro before a crowd of 10,000 spectators.

In 2016, Balkany repeated as Amateur Champions of Ukraine.

The club successfully passed attestation and will compete in the 2016–17 Ukrainian Second League season.

== Current squad ==
As of 28 August 2022

Note: Flags indicate national team as defined under FIFA eligibility rules; some limited exceptions apply. Players may hold more than one non-FIFA nationality.

No.	Pos.	Nation	Player
11	MF	UKR	Bohdan Prybluda
12	GK	UKR	Serhiy Lukash
19	MF	UKR	Mykhaylo Popov
21	MF	UKR	Serhiy Platunov
33	MF	UKR	Vadym Zlatov

No.	Pos.	Nation	Player
69	MF	UKR	Oleksandr Mykhaylichenko
71	GK	UKR	Mykhaylo Bilousov
77	MF	UKR	Ruslan Ivanchenko
80	DF	UKR	Serhiy Novikov
89	DF	UKR	Oleksandr Ilnytskyi

== Honors ==
Amateur Championship of Ukraine

- Winners (2): 2015, 2016

Ukrainian Amateur Cup

- Runners-up (1): 2015

Odesa Oblast Championship

- Winners (1): 2013

Trusevych Cup (Odesa Oblast Cup)

- Winners (2): 2014, 2015

Sarata Raion Championship

- Winners (6): 2008, 2009, 2010, 2011, 2013, 2014

Sarata Raion Cup

- Winners (4): 2008, 2010, 2011, 2012
- Governor's Cup of Odesa Oblast: 2011
- Cup Winners' Cup Odesa Oblast: 2015
- Super Cup Odesa Oblast: 2015

== League and cup history ==
Season	Div.	Pos.	Pl.	W	D	L	GS	GA	P	Domestic Cup	Other		Notes
2014	4th	1	8	4	1	3	14	9	13				
2014	4th	4	3	1	0	2	4	4	3				
2015	4th	1	6	4	2	0	11	6	14				
2015	4th	1	10	7	2	1	14	10	23	1/16 finals	UAC	Runners-up	Champions
2016	4th	1	6	5	0	1	19	6	15	1/16 finals			Champion
2016–17	3rd	4	32	16	9	7	54	32	57	1/32 finals			Promoted
2017–18	2nd	11	34	9	13	12	30	35	40	1/32 finals			
2018–19	2nd	8	28	10	8	10	28	31	38	1/32 finals			
2019–20	2nd	14	30	5	10	15	27	51	25	1/16 finals			Relegated
2020–21	3rd									1/64 finals			

== Managers ==
- 2013 Andriy Parkhomenko
- 2014-2015 Dmytro Holubev
- 2015-2020 Andriy Parkhomenko
- 2020- Denys Kolchin
