= Dmytro Horbatenko =

Ukrainian footballer (born 1973)

Personal information
- Full name: Dmytro Heorhiiovych Horbatenko
- Date of birth: 17 May 1973 (age 53)
- Height: 1.82 m (6 ft 0 in)
- Position: Midfielder

Youth career
- Chornomorets Odesa
- DYuSSh-6 Odesa

Senior career*
Years	Team	Apps	(Gls)
1990–1992	Chornomorets Odesa	0	(0)
1992	→ Chornomorets-2 Odesa (loan)	42	(1)
1993	Tavriya Kherson	38	(2)
1994	Vorskla Poltava	16	(0)
1994–1995	KAMAZ-Chally Naberezhnye Chelny	14	(0)
1994–1995	→ KAMAZ-d Naberezhnye Chelny (loans)	8	(2)
1995	Neftekhimik Nizhnekamsk	12	(0)
1996	Volgar-Gazprom Astrakhan	15	(0)
1996–1997	Portovyk Illichivsk	11	(2)
1997–1999	Zvezda Irkutsk	82	(4)
2000–2001	Lokomotiv Chita	55	(1)
2002	FC KAPO Pervomayske		
2002	FC Lokomotyv Odesa		
2002–2003	Mykolaiv	8	(0)
2003	FC Lokomotyv Odesa		
2003–2004	Cherkasy	2	(0)
2004	FC Bilyayivka		
2004	FC Ivan Odesa		
2005–2007	FC Druzhba Narodiv Odesa		
2012	FC Tarutyne		

Managerial career
- 2009: FC Tarutyne
- 2009–2010: Chornomorets Odesa (youth school)
- 2013–2017: Zhemchuzhyna Odesa (assistant)
- 2018: Zhemchuzhyna Odesa
- * Club domestic league appearances and goals

Dmytro Heorhiiovych Horbatenko (Ukrainian: Дмитро Георгійович Горбатенко; born 17 May 1973) is a Ukrainian football coach and a former player. He managed Zhemchuzhyna Odesa.

== Honours ==
Chornomorets Odesa

- Ukrainian Cup: 1992
