= FC Zhemchuzhyna Odesa =

Zhemchuzhyna Odesa
- Full name: FC Zhemchuzhyna Odesa
- Founded: 2013
- Dissolved: 2018
- Ground: Spartak Stadium
- Capacity: 4,800
- Chairman: Oleksandr Demenchuk
- League: not active
- 2017–18: First League, 18th (relegated)
- Website: http://fczhemchuzhina.od.ua/
| Home colours | Away colours |

FC Zhemchuzhyna Odesa was a professional Ukrainian football from Odesa. The club was founded in 2013, but dissolved in 2018.

The club was admitted to Ukrainian Second League in 2016–17 season. In its first season in it, the club became the champion and received promotion to the First League. Early May 2018 club president Oleksandr Demenchuk stated that the club would dissolve because of financial reasons.

The club's name is Zhemchuzhyna (Russian: Жемчужина) which is foreign in Ukraine and means a pearl.

== History ==
The club was created in August 2013 and formed from the graduates of the Odesa football school. Initially, the team consisted football veterans from Odesa, friends of the club president, Oleksandr Babych, Gennady Nizhegorodov and Vitaliy Rudenko. From the first days of creation head coach of the club was a former defender of Chornomorets Odesa and Kryvbas Kryvyi Rih Denys Kolchin.

In the 2014–15 season the team participated in the Odesa City winter championship and won the championship defeating FC Real Pharma Odesa.

In 2015, the club debuted in the Amateur League of Ukraine, finishing in the eight best teams of the tournament and in 2016 they repeated in reaching the quarterfinals of the tournament.

The club was admitted to the PFL in 2016 and won the 2016–17 Ukrainian Second League. gaining promotion to Ukrainian First League.

On 4 May 2018, three matchdays before the end of 2017–18 Ukrainian First League season, PFL informed that the club withdrew from the competition due to dissolution. President Oleksandr Demenchuk confirmed dissolution of the club because of financial reasons.

== Honors ==
- Ukrainian Second League
  - Winners (1): 2016–17
- Odesa City Winter Championships: 2014–15

== League and cup history ==
| Season | Div. | Pos. | Pl. | W | D | L | GS | GA | P | Cup | Europe | Notes |
|---|---|---|---|---|---|---|---|---|---|---|---|---|
| 2015 | 4th | 2 | 6 | 2 | 3 | 1 | 5 | 4 | 9 | | | |
| 2015 | 4th | 4 | 10 | 4 | 3 | 3 | 12 | 10 | 15 | | | |
| 2016 | 4th | 2 | 6 | 4 | 1 | 1 | 12 | 8 | 13 | | | 1/4 finals |
| 2016–17 | 3rd | 1 | 32 | 24 | 4 | 4 | 75 | 22 | 76 | 1/16 finals | | Promoted |
| 2017–18 | 2nd | 18 | 34 | 7 | 6 | 21 | 33 | 54 | 27 | 1/16 finals | | Withdrew |

== Last-known squad ==
As of 4 May 2018

Note: Flags indicate national team as defined under FIFA eligibility rules; some limited exceptions apply. Players may hold more than one non-FIFA nationality.

| No. | Pos. | Nation | Player |
|---|---|---|---|
| 4 | DF | UKR | Oleh Humenyuk |
| 7 | MF | UKR | Maksym Havrylenko |
| 8 | MF | UKR | Viktor Serdenyuk (on loan from Chornomorets Odesa) |
| 9 | DF | UKR | Danylo Spas |
| 10 | MF | UKR | Yevhen Terzi |
| 11 | FW | UKR | Taras Lazarovych |
| 13 | MF | UKR | Artem Seleznyov |
| 14 | MF | UKR | Mykhaylo Popov (on loan from Chornomorets Odesa) |
| 15 | DF | UKR | Petro Stasyuk |
| 16 | GK | UKR | Serhiy Kravchenko |
| 19 | MF | UKR | Denys Dolinskyi |

| No. | Pos. | Nation | Player |
|---|---|---|---|
| 20 | DF | UKR | Vladyslav Schetinin (on loan from Chornomorets Odesa) |
| 21 | GK | UKR | Yaroslav Vazhynskyi |
| 22 | MF | UKR | Ruslan Palamar |
| 23 | DF | UKR | Denys Norenkov |
| 24 | MF | UKR | Oleksiy Chernyshev (on loan from Chornomorets Odesa) |
| 27 | FW | UKR | Mykhaylo Shestakov |
| 60 | DF | UKR | Dmytro Pospelov |
| 77 | MF | UKR | Dmytro Klimakov |
| 97 | GK | UKR | Dmytro Starodubets |
| 99 | DF | UKR | Dmytro Demenchuk (on loan from Chornomorets Odesa) |

== Coaches ==
- Nov 2014 – 21 Aug 2017: Denys Kolchin
- 24 Aug 2017 – 22 Jan 2018: Leonid Haidarzhy (caretaker as sportive director)
- 22 Jan 2018 – May 2018: Dmytro Horbatenko
