= Illya Blyznyuk =

Ukrainian footballer and coach (born 1973)

Ilya Blyznyuk
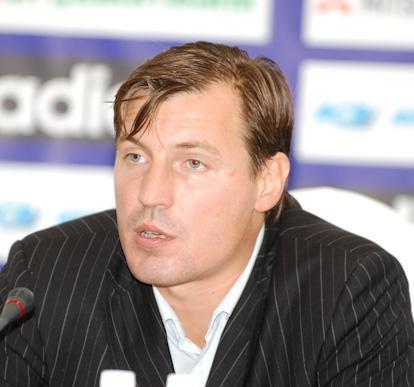

Personal information
- Full name: Ilya Vladyslavovych Blyznyuk
- Date of birth: 28 July 1973 (age 53)
- Place of birth: Zaporizhia, Ukrainian SSR
- Height: 6 ft 4 3/4 in (1.95 m)
- Position: Goalkeeper

Youth career
- –1992: Metalurh Zaporizhzhia

Senior career*
Years	Team	Apps	(Gls)
1992–1995	Metalurh Zaporizhzhia	41	(0)
1995–1996	Zirka Kirovohrad	33	(0)
1996–1999	Dnipro Dnipropetrovsk	54	(0)
1999–2000	Dynamo Kyiv	0	(0)
1999–2000	→ Dynamo-2 Kyiv	2	(0)
1999–2000	→ Dynamo-3 Kyiv	11	(0)
2000	Rostselmash	14	(0)
2000	Dynamo Kyiv	2	(0)
2000	→ Dynamo-2 Kyiv	3	(0)
2000	→ Dynamo-3 Kyiv	5	(0)
2001–2004	Rostov	73	(0)
2003	→ Spartak-Alania Vladikavkaz (loan)	5	(0)
2005	Tom Tomsk	13	(0)
2005–2006	Kryvbas Kryvyi Rih	6	(0)
2006	Shinnik Yaroslavl	11	(0)
2007	Rostov	7	(0)
Total		280	(0)

International career
1994–1995	Ukraine U-21	5	(0)
1996–1997	Ukraine	2	(0)

Managerial career
- 2008: Illichivets Mariupol (assistant)
- 2008–2009: Illichivets Mariupol (caretaker)
- 2009–2010: Illichivets Mariupol
- 2011: Rostov (assistant)
- 2012–2013: Zirka Kirovohrad
- 2013–2015: Poltava
- 2016: Metalurh Zaporizhzhia
- 2017: Yednist' Plysky
- 2017: Sumy
- 2019: Avanhard Kramatorsk (GK coach)
- 2020–2021: Mykolaiv
- * Club domestic league appearances and goals

Ilya Vladyslavovych Blyznyuk (Ukrainian: Ілля Владиславович Близнюк; born 28 July 1973 is a Ukrainian football coach and former goalkeeper.

== Career ==
Blyznyuk is a product of FC Metalurh Zaporizhia football academy (sports school). He made his debut in the Vyshcha Liha for his home team on 19 April 1992 in an away game against FC Nyva Vinnytsia when he came out on substitution for Yuriy Syvukha. The game was tied at 1 and Blyznyuk allowed the goal against. In his first professional season, Blyznyuk played 5 games and allowed 7 goals. For the next several seasons he was sharing the play time in the club with Syvukha. In 1994 with arrival of Taras Hrebenyuk, Blyznyuk played only 4 games in the league.

He remained with Metalurh until 1995 when he moved to the top league newcomer FC Zirka Kirovohrad where he became the main goalkeeper playing in 33 games out of 34. Zirka impressed many by its performance placing that season 6th among 18 teams. In 1996 he was invited to FC Dnipro Dnipropetrovsk and made a debut for the Ukrainian national football team on 13 August 1996. In 1996–1998 Blyznyuk was the first goalkeeper for Dnipro and in 1997–98 season appeared at clubs' continental level competitions.

In 1998 he was invited to FC Dynamo Kyiv but played only for the club's reserve teams at lower levels. In 2000 Blyznyuk was loaned away to FC Rostselmash Rostov-na-Donu. The time in Rostov did not earn him a place on the Dynamo's first team and in 2001 he left Dynamo for Rostov. In Rostov Blyznyuk remained until 2005 when he moved to the Russian Premier League newcomer FC Tom Tomsk. After a season in Tomsk, Blyznyuk returned briefly to Ukraine playing for FC Kryvbas Kryvyi Rih, but in 2006 he returned to Russia signing with FC Shinnik Yaroslavl. Blyznyuk finished his playing career following the 2007 season in Rostov.

== International career ==
He played for Ukraine national under-21 football team. He also was called up to Ukraine national football team for which played only 2 matches all friendlies. He made his debut for the national team on 13 August 1996 at the home game against Lithuania when on 68th minute he substituted Oleh Suslov. The game ended in 5:2 win for Ukraine, yet Blyznyuk yielded one of the goals which was from Eimantas Poderis. His second and the last match Blyznyuk played on 23 March 1997 as another home game against Moldova. He started out the game but was substituted in half-time by Oleksandr Shovkovskyi. The match ended in 1:0 win for Ukraine.

== Personal life ==
Blyznyuk is the father of 3 children, including Russian athlete Anastasia Bliznyuk who became 2012 Olympics and 2016 Olympics champion in group rhythmic gymnastics. His son Volodymyr Blyznyuk is a professional Ukrainian footballer.
