= Taras Lazarovych =

Ukrainian footballer

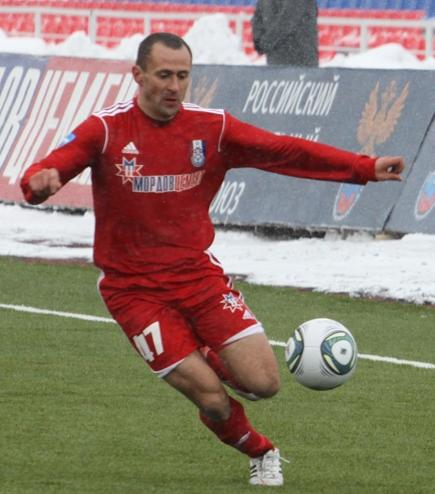
- With Mordovia Saransk in 2012

Personal information
- Full name: Taras Mykhaylovych Lazarovych
- Date of birth: 22 April 1982 (age 44)
- Place of birth: Chynadiiovo, Ukrainian SSR, Soviet Union
- Height: 1.75 m (5 ft 9 in)
- Position: Striker

Senior career*
Years	Team	Apps	(Gls)
2004	Zirka Kirovohrad	13	(2)
2005–2009	Metalurh Zaporizhzhia	43	(3)
2005–2006	→ Metalurh-2 Zaporizhzhia	8	(7)
2009–2011	Zorya Luhansk	71	(12)
2012	Mordovia Saransk	6	(0)
2012–2014	Metalurh Zaporizhzhia	24	(1)
2015–2018	Zhemchuzhyna Odesa	64	(20)
- * Club domestic league appearances and goals

Taras Mykhaylovych Lazarovych (Ukrainian: Тарас Михайлович Лазарович; born 22 April 1982) is a Ukrainian retired professional footballer who played as a forward.
