= Diego Aguirre (Argentine footballer) =

Argentine footballer

Personal information
- Full name: Diego Ezequiel Aguirre
- Date of birth: 11 January 1993 (age 33)
- Place of birth: Gregorio de Laferrère, Argentina
- Height: 1.87 m (6 ft 2 in)
- Position: Striker

Team information
- Current team: Defensores Unidos

Youth career
- –2011: Nueva Chicago

Senior career*
Years	Team	Apps	(Gls)
2011–2014	Nueva Chicago	11	(0)
2013–2014	→ Deportivo Español (loan)	30	(4)
2015	Deportivo Laferrere	6	(0)
2016	Unión Santiago	4	(0)
2016	Deportivo Armenio	11	(0)
2017	Deportes Valdivia	12	(2)
2017–2018	Arsenal Kyiv	12	(1)
2018	Spartaks Jūrmala	9	(0)
2019–2020	San Miguel	11	(1)
2020–2021	Cañuelas	29	(14)
2022	Unión San Felipe	14	(2)
2022–2023	Deportivo Merlo	37	(8)
2024	Acassuso	40	(18)
2025–	Defensores Unidos	22	(3)
- * Club domestic league appearances and goals as of 17:44, 30 July 2025 (UTC)

Diego Ezequiel Aguirre (born 11 January 1993) is an Argentine footballer who plays as a striker for Argentine club Defensores Unidos.

== Career ==
During his professional career, Aguirre mainly played for Argentinian lower league clubs. He also spent one season at Deportes Valdivia in the Chilean second tier, where he appeared in 12 matches and scored two goals.

In August 2017, he signed a contract with the Ukrainian First League side FC Arsenal Kyiv.

In the summer of 2018 he moved to Latvian club Spartaks Jūrmala.
