= Serhiy Litovchenko (footballer, born 1979) =

Ukrainian footballer and manager

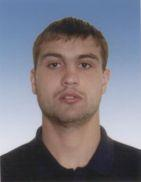

Personal information
- Date of birth: 30 January 1979 (age 47)
- Place of birth: Mykolaiv, Soviet Union (now Ukraine)
- Height: 1.85 m (6 ft 1 in)
- Position: Defender

Youth career
- Torpedo Mykolaiv

Senior career*
Years	Team	Apps	(Gls)
1996–1997	Hidroliznik Olshanske	10	(0)
1998–2000	LU/Daugava Rīga	52	(0)
2001	Cherkasy	9	(0)
2002–2004	Nafkom-Akademia Irpen	60	(4)
2004	Torpedo-SKA Minsk	21	(0)
2004–2006	Tavriya Simferopol	30	(2)
2006–2009	Arsenal Kyiv	38	(0)
2010	Volyn Lutsk	11	(0)
2011	Helios Kharkiv	3	(0)
2011	Mykolaiv	12	(0)
2015	Arsenal-Kyivshchyna	2	(0)
Total		248	(6)

Managerial career
- 2015: Arsenal Kyiv (assistant)
- 2015–2018: Arsenal Kyiv
- 2018: Dnepr Mogilev
- 2019–2020: Lokomotiv Yerevan
- 2020–2021: Rubikon Kyiv
- 2021–2022: Olimpik Donetsk
- * Club domestic league appearances and goals

Serhiy Litovchenko (Ukrainian: Сергій Вікторович Літовченко, born 30 January 1979) is a Ukrainian former professional football player and current manager of Olimpik Donetsk. Some depict his last name as Lytovchenko.
