= PFC Sumy =

FC Sumy
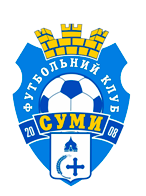
- Full name: Football Club Sumy
- Founded: 2008
- Dissolved: 2019
- Ground: Yuvileiny Stadium, Sumy
- Capacity: 25,830

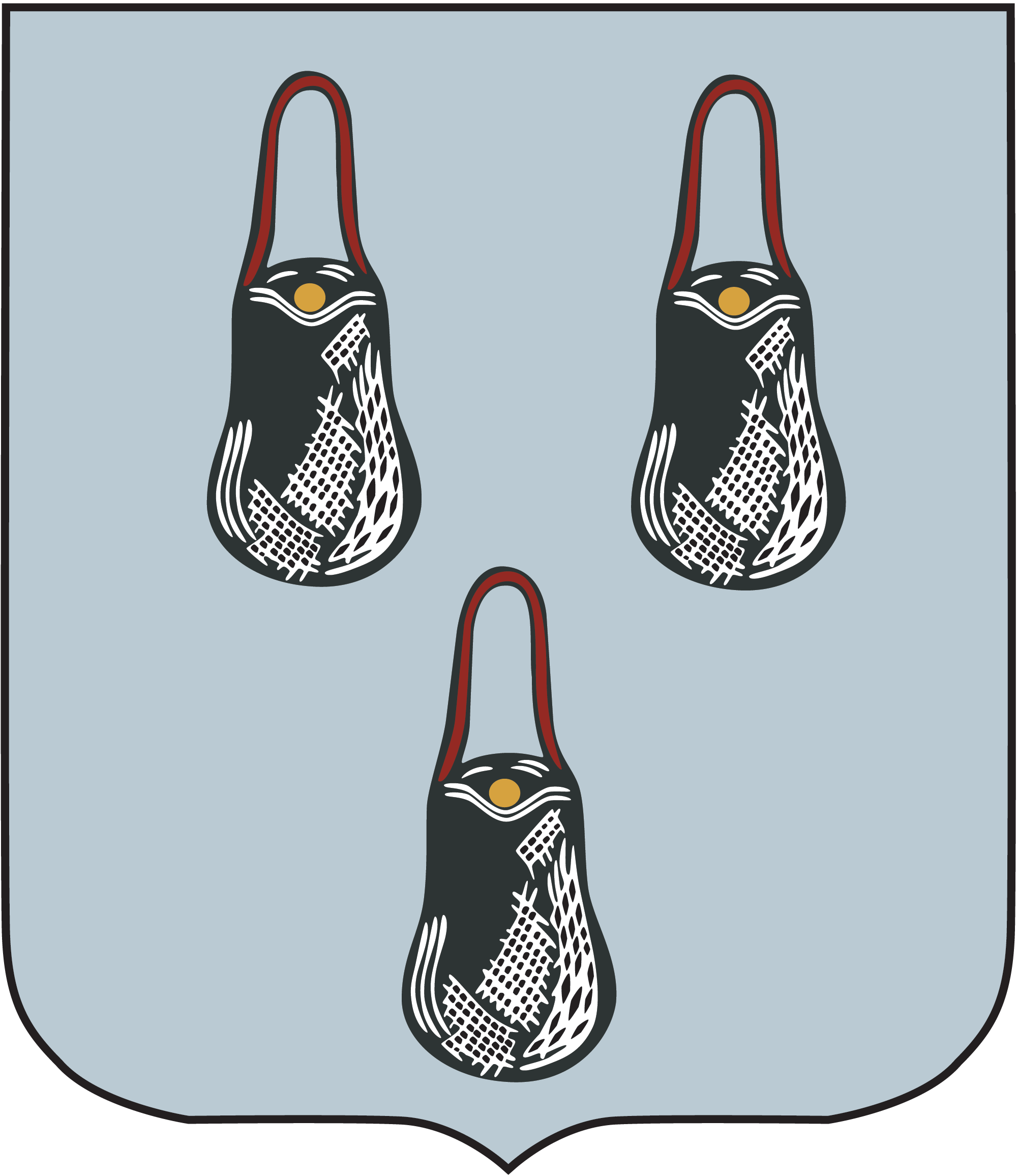
Sumy coat of arms

FC Sumy was a Ukrainian football team based in the city of Sumy, which used to play in the Persha Liha. In April 2019 the Ukrainian Football Federation deprived the club of its professional status.

Previously until 2008 FC Sumy name carried by two clubs as a provisional name. First it appeared in Ukraine in 1995 when FC SBTS Sumy was renamed and in 1996 changed its name again to Ahroservis Sumy folding after the season. In 1998 the Krasnopillia forestry Yavir was relocated to Sumy and at first named as Yavir-Sumy, but already in 1999 it was renamed again as Spartak Sumy. This club in 2002 carried name of FC Sumy after being merged with Frunzenets-Liha-99, but already next year it changed back to Spartak and in 2006 folded.

In 2008 the revived Krasnopillia forestry team Yavir was brought to Sumy again changing its name to FC Sumy. That team competed until 2019 and for its logo used a coat of arms of Sumy Oblast.

Football clubs known as FC Sumy
Club	as FC Sumy	original club
FC Ahrotekhservis Sumy	1995–1996	Avtomobilist Sumy (1965–1993)
FC Spartak Sumy	2002	Yavir Krasnopillia (1982–1998)
PFC Sumy	2008–2019	Yavir Krasnopillia (2001–2008)
FC Sumy	2020–	LS Group Verkhnya Syrovatka (2016–2020)

The club plays at the Sumy Oblast central stadium, Yuvileiny Stadium, that was completed in 2001 and has 25,830 spectator seats. It did cost the investors over 50 million euros to construct, making it the most expensive and largest stadium that any Ukrainian Second League club uses.

== Brief history ==
=== FC Yavir Krasnopillia ===
FC Sumy's predecessor, FC Yavir Krasnopillia, was established back in 1982 at the Krasnopillia Forestry and competed at regional competitions of Sumy Oblast. In 1991 the club entered the republican amateur competitions. After dissolution of the Soviet Union, the club was admitted to the Ukrainian Transitional League. Yavir Krasnopillia became a champion of the 1994–95 Ukrainian Second League and was promoted to the First League.

After the main team of the Sumy Oblast, FC Ahrotekhservis Sumy, was relegated out of the Second League in 1996, there were talks to revive football in Sumy. On the initiative of the regional government in 1998 Yavir was transferred to the regional center and renamed as Yavir-Sumy. Later it was transformed into FC Spartak Sumy. With that the main city stadium, formerly Spartak Stadium was finally finished and renamed as Yuvileinyi Stadium.

In 2000 Yavir Krasnopillia was revived in its home town and restarted its participation in regional competitions, while Spartak Sumy competed in the First League. In 2002 Yavir again was admitted to the Second League. In 2006 Spartak Sumy went bankrupt and was dissolved. Again there surfaced talks about bringing big football back to Sumy. In 2008 the new Yavir was again moved to Sumy.

=== FC Sumy / PFC Sumy ===
The city of Sumy for quite some time used to have its own football teams during the Soviet period, such as Spartak, Frunzenets, and others which eventually were disbanded. The "FC Sumy" football project was another attempt to reestablish the football tradition in the city.

FC Sumy played in the vastly superior Yuvileiny Stadium which can hold 25,830 spectators.

In the fall of 2008 they changed their name once again to FC Sumy. They play in the yellow and green colors of their former stadium Kolos, which can accommodate up to 3,000 spectators. After the 2009–10 Ukrainian Second League season the club again found itself in financial distress and failed attestation, which was followed by their license being withdrawn by the PFL. On 16 June 2010 it was announced that the club is being sponsored by the Russian billionaire Konstantin Grigorishin (through "Sumy Engineering"). In July 2010 FC Sumy were readmitted to the Ukrainian Second League – please refer to 2010–11 Ukrainian Second League for details.

In June 2017 it was announced that "Sumy Engineering" transferred its corporate rights on the club to the Romny-based company "Ahrobiznes TSK". Ahrobiznes TSK has its own football club since 2014 that was playing at amateur and regional levels.

In April 2018 the local news media announced a sudden death of director of Romny Ahrobiznes and a member of regional council. On 15 June 2018 FC Ahrobiznes TSK Romny announced that it is dissolved due to financial difficulties.

On 13 August 2018 head coach of PFC Sumy Zolotnytskyi announced that the club has salary debts to players and is forced to get relocated to Okhtyrka which team recently was dissolved. In October PFC Sumy acknowledged that it has problems with financing, in addition earlier this month it was accused in match-fixing.

On 9 January 2019 there appeared information that the club might not finish the 2018–19 Ukrainian First League. On 11 April 2019 the Ukrainian Football Federation indeed did deprived the club of its professional status. This was done due to match fixing by players of the club who were also banned from playing professional football (they were Serhiy Harashchenkov, Taras Duray and Ehor Luhovyi) in addition to president of the club Rostyslav Kozar.

PFC Sumy received new ownership during winter break of the 2018–19 season in the face of Serhiy Vashchenko who earlier that season was supposed to become the owner of Kobra Kharkiv. The new head coach was announced also former head coach of Kobra, Oleksandr Oliynyk. According to the former club's director Anatoliy Boiko, on 1 December 2018 PFC Sumy did not have any players on contract. On 11 April 2019, the FFU Control and Disciplinary Committee adopted its decision to strip the club of professional status and exclude the club from any competitions that it is participating currently or in the future. However the club has a right to file an appeal. Additional separate sanctions will be also applied against the club's playing and administrative personnel. On 14 April 2019, the chairman of the FFU committee of ethics and fair play Francesco Baranka noted that PFC Sumy has earned some €10 million in match fixing. More to it, Ukrainian coach Oleksandr Sevidov who held post of head coach consultant in PFC Sumy and previously managed FC Illichivets Mariupol received a lifetime disqualification.

On 1 October 2019 there appeared some information that the club has intentions to resume its participation in football competitions for the 2020–21 season.

On 10 October 2019 the chief editor of magazine "Futbol" Artem Frankov informed the UAF Committee of Appeals cancelled the decision of the UAF Control and Disciplinary Committee in regards to PFC Sumy.

== Club names and crests ==
- 1999–2008: Futbol'nyi Klub "Yavir" Krasnopillya (Ukrainian: Футбольний Клуб "Явір" Краснопілля) (Football Club Yavir Krasnopillya)
- 2008–2010: Futbol'nyi Klub "Sumy" (Ukrainian: Футбольний Клуб "Суми") (Football Club Sumy)
- 2010–2019: Profesiynyi Futbol'nyi Klub "Sumy" (Ukrainian: Професійний Футбольний Клуб "Суми") (Professional Football Club Sumy)
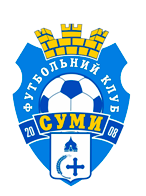
Logo of the 2008–2019 team

Sumy Oblast coat of arms

Yavir Krasnopillia

== Stadium ==
Current

- Yuvileiny Stadium
- Avanhard Stadium (reserve)

Former

- Kolos Stadium (3,000)

== Honors ==
- Ukrainian Druha Liha: 2
  - 1994–95, 2011–12

== League and cup history ==
=== FC Yavir Krasnopillya (2001–2008) ===
Season	Div.	Pos.	Pl.	W	D	L	GS	GA	P	Domestic Cup	Europe	Notes
2001	Regional Level (Sumy Oblast)											
2001	4th	5	8	1	1	6	2	25	4			
2002	4th	5	8	1	2	5	3	11	5			
2002–03	3rd "C"	10	28	8	8	12	27	41	32	1/8 finals		
2003–04	3rd "C"	10	30	10	7	13	20	28	37	1/32 finals		
2004–05	3rd "C"	10	28	8	5	15	24	40	29	1/32 finals		
2005–06	3rd "C"	6	24	11	5	8	25	26	38	1/32 finals		
2006–07	3rd "B"	13	28	6	7	15	18	30	25	1/16 finals		
2007–08	3rd "B"	13	34	10	7	17	36	62	37	Did not enter		
Since 2008 at Regional Level (Sumy Oblast)

=== FC Sumy (2008–2019) ===
Season	Div.	Pos.	Pl.	W	D	L	GS	GA	P	Domestic Cup	Europe	Notes
FC Sumy
2008–09	3rd "B"	17	34	6	10	18	27	60	22	1/64 finals		–6 – Name change
2009–10	3rd "B"	8	26	10	6	10	32	34	36	1/32 finals		
PFC Sumy
2010–11	3rd "A"	2	22	14	3	5	38	13	45	1/64 finals		
2011–12	3rd "A"	1	26	21	3	2	51	13	66	1/8 finals		Promoted
2012–13	2nd	9	34	14	8	12	32	35	50	1/32 finals		
2013–14	2nd	11	30	11	6	13	29	39	39	1/32 finals		
2014–15	2nd	8	30	12	7	11	35	41	43	1/16 finals		
2015–16	2nd	14	30	8	6	16	35	54	30	1/16 finals		
2016–17	2nd	15	34	8	12	14	34	44	36	1/32 finals		Relegation play-off winner
2017–18	2nd	12	33	11	6	16	27	37	39	1/32 finals		
2018–19	2nd	14	28	3	7	18	21	91	16	1/16 finals		Excluded

== Managers ==
=== PFC Sumy ===
- 2008 – 2009 Volodymyr Bohach
- 2009 – 2010 Valeriy Bermudes
- 2010 – 2011 Ihor Zhabchenko
- 2011 – 2013 Ihor Zakhariak
- 2013 Andriy Kononenko (interim)
- 2013 – 2014 Andriy Kononenko
- 2014 Serhiy Strashnenko (interim)
- 2014 – 2016 Yuriy Yaroshenko
- 2016 – 2017 Pavlo Kikot
- 2017 Volodymyr Lyutyi
- 2017 Anatoliy Bezsmertnyi
- 2017 Illya Blyznyuk
- 2017 – 2018 Bohdan Yesyp
- 2018 Serhiy Zolotnytskyi
- 2019 Oleksandr Oliynyk (interim)
- 2019 Oleh Lutkov

== See also ==
- FC Spartak Sumy
- FC Avtomobilist Sumy
- FC Frunzenets Sumy
