= 2016–17 Ukrainian Second League =

Ukrainian Second League
- Season: 2016–17
- Champions: Zhemchuzhyna
- Promoted: Zhemchuzhyna Odesa; Rukh Vynnyky; Kremin Kremenchuk; Balkany Zorya
- Relegated: ~~Illichivets-2~~ (withdrew); ~~Krystal~~ (withdrew)
- Matches: 257
- Goals: 788 (3.07 per match)
- Top goalscorer: 25 goals – Ihor Khudobyak (Teplovyk-Prykarpattia)
- Biggest home win: 8 – Zhemchuzhyna 8–0 Metalurh (Round 34)
- Biggest away win: 12 – Metalurh 1–13 Enerhiya NK (Round 27)
- Highest scoring: 14 – Metalurh 1–13 Enerhiya NK (Round 27)
- Longest winning run: 13 – Zhemchuzhyna (Round 6–18)
- Longest unbeaten run: 21 – Zhemchuzhyna (Round 5–19, 22–27)
- Longest losing run: 6 – Sudnobudivnyk (Round 28–32, 34)
- Highest attendance: 6,300 – Podillya–Metalurh (Round 3)
- Lowest attendance: 90 – Arsenal-Kyivshchyna–Zhemchuzhyna (Round 27)
- All statistics correct as of 2 June 2017.

The 2016–17 Ukrainian Second League was the 26th season of 3rd level professional football in Ukraine. The competition commenced on 23 July 2016 with one match from Round 1. The spring session started on 18 March 2017 with the competition ending on 2 June 2017. The fixtures were announced on 16 July 2016.

== Team changes ==
Prior to the season commencing at the Conference of the PFL in preparation for the season the committee decided to expand the competition to 17 teams.

=== Admitted teams ===
The following 10 teams were admitted by the PFL after participating in the 2016 Ukrainian Football Amateur League and passing attestation which continued until 15 July.

- Balkany Zorya – champion (debut)
- Illichivets-2 Mariupol – reserve competitions (returning after an absence of five seasons)
- Inhulets-2 Petrove – group stage (debut)
- Metalurh Zaporizhzhia – group stage (debut)
- Nyva-V Vinnytsia – group stage (returning after an absence of seven seasons)
- Podillya Khmelnytskyi – group stage (returning after an absence of eight seasons, however in the 2013–14 Ukrainian Second League season Dynamo represented the city of Khmelnytskyi)
- Rukh Vynnyky – finalist (previous season) (debut)
- Sudnobudivnyk Mykolaiv – group stage (debut)
- Teplovyk Ivano-Frankivsk – group stage (debut)
- Zhemchuzhyna Odesa – quarterfinals (debut)

=== Withdrawn teams ===
- Barsa Sumy withdrew from the PFL before the start of the 2016–17 season.

=== Relegated teams ===
No teams were relegated from the Ukrainian First League

=== Location map ===
The following displays the location of teams.

Home venues of teams in the 2016–17 Ukrainian Second League.

== Stadiums ==
The following stadiums are considered home grounds for the teams in the competition.

| Rank | Stadium | Capacity | Club |
|---|---|---|---|
| 1 | Arena Lviv (Note: Rukh Vynnyky played their Round 21 home match against Metalurh at Arena Lviv) | 34,915 | Rukh Vynnyky |
| 2 | Central Stadium | 14,623 | Sudnobudivnyk Mykolaiv |
| 3 | Slavutych-Arena | 12,000 | Metalurh Zaporizhzhia |
| 4 | SC Podillya | 10,031 | Podillya Khmelnytskyi |
| 5 | Trudovi Reservy Stadium | 10,000 | Arsenal-Kyivshchyna Bila Tserkva |
| 6 | MCS Rukh | 6,500 | Teplovyk-Prykarpattia Ivano-Frankivsk |
| 7 | Spartak Stadium | 5,000 | Zhemchuzhyna Odesa; Real Pharma Odesa |
| 8 | Krystal Stadium | 3,400 | Krystal Kherson |
| 9 | SC Nyva | 3,150 | Nyva-V Vinnytsia |
| 10 | Zakhidnyi Stadium | 3,206 | Illichivets-2 Mariupol |
| 11 | Enerhiya Stadium | 3,000 | Enerhiya Nova Kakhovka |
| 12 | Boris Tropaneț Stadium | 1,854 | Balkany Zorya |
| 13 | Inhulets Stadium | 1,720 | Inhulets-2 Petrove |
| 14 | Kremin-Arena | 1,566 | Kremin Kremenchuk |
| 15 | Elektrometalurh Stadium | 1,500 | FC Nikopol |
| 16 | Zatys | 1,250 | Myr Hornostayivka |
| 17 | Bohdan Markevych Stadium | 900 | Rukh Vynnyky |

== Managers ==
| Club | Head coach | Replaced coach |
|---|---|---|
| Arsenal-Kyivshchyna Bila Tserkva | (Ukraine) Oleksandr Akimov | (Ukraine) Mykola Lytvyn (caretaker) (Ukraine) Andriy Ushchapovskyi |
| Balkany Zorya | (Ukraine) Andriy Parkhomenko | |
| Enerhiya Nova Kakhovka | (Ukraine) Oleh Fedorchuk | |
| Illichivets-2 Mariupol | (Ukraine) Oleksandr Volkov | |
| Inhulets-2 Petrove | (Ukraine) Andriy Kononenko | |
| Kremin Kremenchuk | (Ukraine) Serhiy Yashchenko | |
| Krystal Kherson | (Ukraine) Oleksiy Yakymenko | (Ukraine) Serhiy Shevtsov |
| Metalurh Zaporizhzhia | (Ukraine) Viktor Zhuk (caretaker) | (Ukraine) Illya Blyznyuk |
| Myr Hornostayivka | (Ukraine) Viktor Bohatyr | |
| Nikopol | (Ukraine) Hryhoriy Varzhelenko | |
| Nyva-V Vinnytsia | (Ukraine) Volodymyr Horilyi | (Ukraine) Yuriy Solovyenko |
| Podillya Khmelnytskyi | (Ukraine) Arkadiy Batalov | (Ukraine) Vitaliy Balytskyi |
| Real Pharma Odesa | (Ukraine) Oleksandr Bondarenko | |
| Rukh Vynnyky | (Ukraine) Ruslan Mostovyi | (Ukraine) Roman Hdanskyi |
| Sudnobudivnyk Mykolaiv | (United States) Dennis Lukens | |
| Teplovyk-Prykarpattia Ivano-Frankivsk | (Ukraine) Volodymyr Kovalyuk | |
| Zhemchuzhyna Odesa | (Ukraine) Denys Kolchin | |

=== Managerial changes ===
| Team | Outgoing head coach | Manner of departure | Date of vacancy | Table | Incoming head coach | Date of appointment | Table |
|---|---|---|---|---|---|---|---|
| Podillya Khmelnytskyi | (Ukraine) Vitaliy Balytskyi | Sacked | 26 September 2016 | | (Ukraine) Arkadiy Batalov | 26 September 2016 | |
| Arsenal-Kyivshchyna Bila Tserkva | (Ukraine) Mykola Lytvyn | Sacked | 13 October 2016 | | (Ukraine) Andriy Ushchapovskyi | 13 October 2016 | |
| Krystal Kherson | (Ukraine) Serhiy Shevtsov | Resigned | 31 October 2016 | | (Ukraine) Oleksiy Yakymenko | 3 November 2016 | |
| Rukh Vynnyky | (Ukraine) Roman Hdanskyi | Health issues | 10 November 2016 | | (Ukraine) Ruslan Mostovyi | 10 November 2016 | |
| Metalurh Zaporizhzhia | (Ukraine) Illya Blyznyuk | Resigned | 11 February 2017 | | (Ukraine) Viktor Zhuk (caretaker) | 11 February 2017 | |
| Nyva-V Vinnytsia | (Ukraine) Yuriy Solovyenko | Sacked | 11 March 2017 | | (Ukraine) Volodymyr Horilyi | 11 March 2017 | |
| Arsenal-Kyivshchyna Bila Tserkva | (Ukraine) Andriy Ushchapovskyi | unknown | April 2017 | | (Ukraine) Oleksandr Akimov | April 2017 | |

== League table ==
| Pos | Team | Pld | W | D | L | GF | GA | GD | Pts | Promotion, qualification or relegation |
|---|---|---|---|---|---|---|---|---|---|---|
| 1 | Zhemchuzhyna Odesa (C, P) | 32 | 24 | 4 | 4 | 75 | 22 | +53 | 76 | Promotion to Ukrainian First League |
| 2 | Rukh Vynnyky (P) | 32 | 23 | 5 | 4 | 68 | 24 | +44 | 74 | Promotion to Ukrainian First League |
| 3 | Kremin Kremenchuk (P) | 32 | 21 | 5 | 6 | 67 | 29 | +38 | 68 | Promotion to Ukrainian First League |
| 4 | Balkany Zorya (P) | 32 | 16 | 9 | 7 | 54 | 32 | +22 | 57 | Qualification to promotion play-offs |
| 5 | Real Pharma Odesa | 32 | 16 | 9 | 7 | 50 | 31 | +19 | 57 | |
| 6 | Inhulets-2 Petrove (Note: Ineligible for promotion.) | 32 | 14 | 8 | 10 | 50 | 33 | +17 | 50 | |
| 7 | Nyva-V Vinnytsia | 32 | 14 | 8 | 10 | 42 | 33 | +9 | 50 | |
| 8 | Enerhiya Nova Kakhovka | 32 | 14 | 6 | 12 | 62 | 46 | +16 | 48 | |
| 9 | Myr Hornostayivka | 32 | 13 | 9 | 10 | 39 | 31 | +8 | 48 | |
| 10 | Teplovyk-Prykarpattia Ivano-Frankivsk (Note: During the winter break the club renamed themselves from Teplovyk Ivano-Frankivsk to Teplovyk-Prykarpattia Ivano-Frankivsk.) | 32 | 14 | 4 | 14 | 51 | 35 | +16 | 46 | |
| 11 | FC Nikopol (Note: During the winter break the club renamed themselves from FC Nikopol-NPHU to FC Nikopol.) | 32 | 12 | 5 | 15 | 40 | 49 | −9 | 41 | |
| 12 | Illichivets-2 Mariupol (Note: FC Illichivets announced that their second team, Illichivets-2, will not complete in the 2017–18 Ukrainian Second League, instead they will play in the Ukrainian Premier League Reserves competition.) | 32 | 11 | 1 | 20 | 42 | 56 | −14 | 34 | Withdrawn after the season |
| 13 | Krystal Kherson (Note: On 30 March 2017, Krystal Kherson informed the PFL that they are withdrawing from the competition due to the club's economic and political situation. On 10 April 2017, the FFU formally expelled the club, and awarded technical victories to their opponents.) (D) | 32 | 7 | 5 | 20 | 31 | 24 | +7 | 26 | Withdrawn during the season |
| 14 | Podillya Khmelnytskyi | 32 | 7 | 4 | 21 | 29 | 68 | −39 | 25 | |
| 15 | Arsenal-Kyivshchyna Bila Tserkva | 32 | 7 | 4 | 21 | 29 | 82 | −53 | 25 | |
| 16 | Metalurh Zaporizhzhia | 32 | 7 | 2 | 23 | 35 | 104 | −69 | 23 | |
| 17 | Sudnobudivnyk Mykolaiv | 32 | 6 | 4 | 22 | 19 | 84 | −65 | 22 | |

Source: PFL.ua
Rules for classification: 1) Points; 2) Goal difference; 3) Goals scored; 4) Head-to-head points; 5) Head-to-head goal difference; 6) Head-to-head away goals scored; 7) Fair play; 8) Draw or play-off.
(C) Champions; (D) Disqualified; (P) Promoted

=== Results ===
| Home \ Away | AKB | BAZ | ENK | IP2 | IL2 | KRE | KRK | MZA | MYH | NIK | NYV | POK | RPO | RUV | SBM | PIF | ZEO |
|---|---|---|---|---|---|---|---|---|---|---|---|---|---|---|---|---|---|
| Arsenal-Kyivschyna Bila Tserkva | | 0–0 | 0–5 | 1–0 | 0–2 | 2–6 | 0–7 | 1–0 | 3–1 | 0–2 | 2–1 | 3–0 | 0–2 | 0–2 | 4–1 | 0–6 | 1–1 |
| Balkany Zorya | 4–2 | | 2–4 | 5–0 | 1–1 | 1–0 | 2–2 | 1–0 | 1–0 | 1–0 | 1–0 | 5–1 | 1–1 | 1–1 | 5–0 | 1–1 | 0–1 |
| Enerhiya Nova Kakhovka | 4–0 | 1–2 | | 0–3 | 3–0 | 1–1 | +:- | 0–0 | 1–3 | 4–1 | 2–1 | 4–2 | 0–0 | 2–1 | 5–1 | 1–0 | 0–2 (Note: Round 13 match between Enerhiya and Zhemchuzhyna postponed due to torrential rain that flooded the pitch. Match was played after Round 15.) |
| Inhulets-2 Petrove | 3–0 | 3–1 | 3–1 | | 3–0 | 0–1 | +:- | 2–2 | 0–0 | 3–0 | 0–0 | 2–0 | 3–1 | 1–3 | 3–0 | 0–2 | 2–3 |
| Illichivets-2 Mariupol | 4–2 | 1–3 | 3–2 | 0–1 | | 1–2 | 1–2 | 4–1 | 1–3 | 1–2 | 1–2 | 3–2 | 3–1 | 1–2 | 4–0 | 2–0 | 0–2 |
| Kremin Kremenchuk | 1–1 | 1–1 | 1–0 | 3–2 | 2–0 | | 5–0 | 2–0 | 2–0 | 3–1 | 2–2 | 4–1 | 3–0 | 1–2 | 3–0 | 1–0 | 2–0 |
| Krystal Kherson | -:+ | -:+ | 1–1 | 1–2 | -:+ | 0–1 | | 2–1 | 0–1 | 0–1 | -:+ | -:+ | -:+ | 1–1 | 2–0 | 2–0 | -:+ (Note: Initially the PFL postponed the Round 21 match between Krystal and Zhemchuzhyna for a later date due to Krystal's economic instability at the club after the winter break giving the club two weeks to stabilize their situation. However, the club informed the PFL prior to their Round 23 match against Myr that they are withdrawing from the competition.) |
| Metalurh Zaporizhzhia | 3–2 | 2–6 | 1–13 (Note: Fourteen goals scored in the match created a new record surpassing the 12–0 victory by Desna Chernihiv over Boyarka-2006 Bojarka in the 2005–06 Ukrainian Second League season.) | 0–6 | 0–5 | 2–1 | 1–6 | | 0–1 | 1–3 | 0–4 | 2–1 | 1–4 | 3–4 | 3–0 | 0–3 | 0–1 |
| Myr Hornostayivka | 4–0 | 0–0 | 0–0 | 0–0 | 2–0 | 3–1 | +:- | 0–3 (Note: Owner of Myr decided to protect the team's pitch due to inclement weather and not allow his team to play the Round 19 match. Technical victory awarded to Metalurh.) | | 3–1 | 0–0 | 3–1 | 0–2 | 0–0 | 6–0 | 1–0 | 0–0 |
| Nikopol | 2–1 | 1–3 | 3–1 | 0–0 | 2–1 | 2–3 | 1–1 | 2–1 | 1–4 | | 0–1 | 3–0 | 2–2 | 1–1 | 4–1 | 2–1 | 1–2 |
| Nyva-V Vinnytsia | 1–1 | 0–2 | 2–2 | 2–1 | 3–1 (Note: Round 19 matches postponed due to heavy snowfalls that made the pitches unplayable. Matches were played in the spring session after Round 24.) | 0–2 | 1–0 | 4–2 | 2–0 | 2–0 | | 4–0 | 1–1 | 2–0 | 0–2 | 2–1 | 0–2 |
| Podillya Khmelnytskyi | 3–2 | 1–0 (Note: Round 19 match between Podillya and Zhemchuzhyna rescheduled for the next day due to heavy snowfall.) | 0–2 | 0–3 (Note: Round 12 match between Podillya and Inhulets-2 was not played due to construction of the running track at the Podillya's Stadium. Control-Disciplinary Committee of the FFU awards a 3–0 technical victory to Inhulets-2. (1 November 2016)) | 1–0 | 0–2 | 1–1 | 1–2 | 2–2 | 1–1 | 0–0 | | 3–0 | 0–2 (Note: Podillya played their Round 10 home fixture at Rukh's Bohdan Markevich Stadium due to construction of the running track at the Podillya's Stadium.) | 2–0 | 2–1 | 1–3 |
| Real Pharma Odesa | 4–0 | 0–0 | 4–1 | 1–1 | 2–0 | 0–1 | 2–0 | 3–1 | 1–0 | 2–0 | 2–1 | 2–0 | | 1–1 | 2–1 | 2–2 | 1–1 |
| Rukh Vynnyky | 5–1 | 2–1 | 5–0 | 3–2 | 6–0 | 4–1 | +:- | 6–1 (Note: Rukh Vynnyky played their Round 21 home match against Metalurh at Arena Lviv since their home ground Bohdan Markevych Stadium was not in ideal playing condition after the winter break.) | 1–0 | 1–0 | 3–0 | 3–1 | 1–0 | | 4–0 | 1–0 | 0–1 |
| Sudnobudivnyk Mykolaiv | 1–0 | 1–2 | 1–0 | 0–0 | 1–0 (Note: Sudnobudivnyk's Round 24 and Round 26 home match was moved to Ivan Stadium in Odesa due to the administration of the Municipal Stadium of Mykolaiv wanting to have the pitch in good order for the Ukrainian Cup semi final.) | 0–7 | +:- | 0–2 | 2–2 | 0–1 | 0–0 | 2–1 | 1–3 | 0–1 | | 2–2 | 1–2 |
| Prykarpattia Ivano-Frankivsk | 3–0 | 3–1 | 3–1 | 1–1 | 0–1 | 1–0 | +:- | 7–0 | 1–0 | 1–0 | 0–2 | 2–1 | 0–4 | 0–1 | 6–0 | | 3–4 |
| Zhemchuzhyna Odesa | 4–0 | 2–0 | 0–1 | 2–0 | 3–1 | 2–2 | 2–3 | 8–0 | 5–0 | 3–0 | 3–1 | 5–0 | 2–0 | 2–1 | 7–0 | 0–1 | |

Updated to match(es) played on 2 June 2017. Source: (in Ukrainian)
Legend: Blue = home team win; Yellow = draw; Red = away team win.

=== Position by round ===
| Team ╲ Round | 1 | 2 | 3 | 4 | 5 | 6 | 7 | 8 | 9 | 10 | 11 | 12 | 13 | 14 | 15 | 16 | 17 | 18 | 19 | 20 | 21 | 22 | 23 | 24 | 25 | 26 | 27 | 28 | 29 | 30 | 31 | 32 | 33 | 34 |
|---|---|---|---|---|---|---|---|---|---|---|---|---|---|---|---|---|---|---|---|---|---|---|---|---|---|---|---|---|---|---|---|---|---|---|
| Zhemchuzhyna Odesa | 3 | 10 | 11 | 13 | 12 | 8 | 5 | 5 | 4 | 4 | 4 | 3 | 3 | 3 | 3 | 3 | 2 | 1 | 1 | 2 | 3 | 3 | 2 | 1 | 1 | 1 | 1 | 1 | 1 | 2 | 2 | 1 | 1 | 1 |
| Rukh Vynnyky | 2 | 1 | 2 | 1 | 1 | 1 | 2 | 2 | 1 | 1 | 2 | 2 | 2 | 2 | 1 | 1 | 3 | 2 | 2 | 3 | 1 | 2 | 1 | 2 | 2 | 2 | 2 | 2 | 2 | 1 | 1 | 2 | 2 | 2 |
| Kremin Kremenchuk | 11 | 9 | 4 | 3 | 3 | 3 | 3 | 3 | 2 | 2 | 1 | 1 | 1 | 1 | 2 | 2 | 1 | 3 | 3 | 1 | 2 | 1 | 3 | 3 | 3 | 3 | 3 | 3 | 3 | 3 | 3 | 3 | 3 | 3 |
| Balkany Zorya | 10 | 3 | 6 | 4 | 6 | 5 | 8 | 8 | 8 | 7 | 5 | 6 | 5 | 4 | 4 | 4 | 5 | 5 | 6 | 6 | 5 | 5 | 5 | 6 | 6 | 6 | 6 | 5 | 6 | 5 | 5 | 5 | 5 | 4 |
| Real Pharma Odesa | 13 | 8 | 7 | 9 | 5 | 9 | 6 | 7 | 6 | 5 | 9 | 10 | 7 | 6 | 5 | 7 | 6 | 6 | 5 | 5 | 6 | 6 | 6 | 5 | 5 | 4 | 4 | 4 | 5 | 4 | 4 | 4 | 4 | 5 |
| Inhulets-2 Petrove | 4 | 2 | 1 | 2 | 2 | 2 | 1 | 1 | 3 | 3 | 3 | 4 | 4 | 5 | 6 | 5 | 4 | 4 | 4 | 4 | 4 | 4 | 4 | 4 | 4 | 5 | 5 | 6 | 4 | 6 | 6 | 6 | 6 | 6 |
| Nyva-V Vinnytsia | 7 | 4 | 9 | 10 | 7 | 6 | 9 | 10 | 9 | 9 | 6 | 7 | 9 | 7 | 8 | 8 | 9 | 10 | 10 | 10 | 11 | 9 | 8 | 8 | 8 | 8 | 7 | 7 | 7 | 7 | 7 | 7 | 7 | 7 |
| Enerhiya Nova Kakhovka | 8 | 12 | 8 | 5 | 9 | 10 | 7 | 9 | 11 | 11 | 11 | 12 | 12 | 12 | 13 | 10 | 10 | 9 | 9 | 8 | 8 | 8 | 9 | 10 | 10 | 9 | 8 | 9 | 9 | 8 | 8 | 8 | 8 | 8 |
| Prykarpattia Ivano-Frankivsk | 1 | 7 | 5 | 8 | 11 | 12 | 11 | 6 | 5 | 8 | 10 | 11 | 8 | 9 | 10 | 11 | 12 | 11 | 11 | 11 | 10 | 12 | 10 | 9 | 9 | 10 | 10 | 10 | 8 | 10 | 9 | 9 | 10 | 9 |
| Myr Hornostayivka | 9 | 6 | 3 | 7 | 4 | 4 | 4 | 4 | 7 | 6 | 8 | 5 | 6 | 8 | 7 | 6 | 7 | 8 | 8 | 7 | 7 | 7 | 7 | 7 | 7 | 7 | 9 | 8 | 10 | 9 | 10 | 10 | 9 | 10 |
| Nikopol | 15 | 13 | 15 | 11 | 13 | 14 | 15 | 14 | 14 | 14 | 13 | 13 | 13 | 13 | 11 | 12 | 13 | 13 | 12 | 12 | 13 | 13 | 13 | 13 | 13 | 11 | 11 | 11 | 11 | 11 | 11 | 11 | 11 | 11 |
| Illichivets-2 Mariupol | 17 | 16 | 16 | 16 | 10 | 7 | 10 | 12 | 10 | 10 | 7 | 8 | 10 | 11 | 12 | 13 | 11 | 12 | 13 | 13 | 12 | 11 | 12 | 11 | 11 | 12 | 12 | 12 | 12 | 12 | 12 | 12 | 12 | 12 |
| Krystal Kherson | 6 | 5 | 10 | 6 | 8 | 11 | 12 | 11 | 12 | 12 | 12 | 9 | 11 | 10 | 9 | 9 | 8 | 7 | 7 | 9 | 9 | 10 | 11 | 12 | 12 | 13 | 13 | 13 | 13 | 13 | 13 | 13 | 13 | 13 |
| Podillya Khmelnytskyi | 5 | 11 | 14 | 15 | 16 | 16 | 16 | 16 | 16 | 17 | 17 | 17 | 17 | 17 | 17 | 17 | 17 | 17 | 17 | 17 | 17 | 17 | 17 | 17 | 16 | 16 | 16 | 17 | 17 | 16 | 16 | 14 | 16 | 14 |
| Arsenal-Kyivschyna Bila Tserkva | 16 | 17 | 17 | 17 | 17 | 17 | 13 | 15 | 15 | 15 | 15 | 16 | 14 | 14 | 14 | 14 | 14 | 14 | 15 | 15 | 16 | 16 | 16 | 16 | 17 | 17 | 17 | 15 | 14 | 14 | 14 | 15 | 14 | 15 |
| Metalurh Zaporizhzhia | 12 | 14 | 12 | 14 | 15 | 15 | 17 | 17 | 17 | 16 | 16 | 15 | 16 | 16 | 16 | 16 | 16 | 16 | 16 | 16 | 15 | 15 | 15 | 14 | 14 | 15 | 15 | 16 | 15 | 15 | 15 | 16 | 15 | 16 |
| Sudnobudivnyk Mykolaiv | 14 | 15 | 13 | 12 | 14 | 13 | 14 | 13 | 13 | 13 | 14 | 14 | 15 | 15 | 15 | 15 | 15 | 15 | 14 | 14 | 14 | 14 | 14 | 15 | 15 | 14 | 14 | 14 | 16 | 17 | 17 | 17 | 17 | 17 |

Updated to match(es) played on 2 June 2017. Source: pfl.ua

== Promotion play-off ==
The draw for promotion play-off scheduling was held on 3 June 2017.

| Team 1 | Agg. | Team 2 | 1st leg | 2nd leg |
|---|---|---|---|---|
| PFC Sumy | 3–1 | FC Balkany Zorya | 2–0 | 1–1 |

=== First leg ===
6 June 2017
17:00 UTC+3

| PFC Sumy | 2–0 | FC Balkany Zorya |
|---|---|---|
| Oliynyk 36'; Yarovenko 60' (pen.) | Report |

Yuvileiny Stadium, Sumy
Referee: Serhiy Boyko (Kyiv Oblast)

=== Second leg ===
10 June 2017
17:00 UTC+3

| FC Balkany Zorya | 1–1 | PFC Sumy |
|---|---|---|
| Raichev 40' | Report | Bohachov 84' (pen.) |

Boris Tropaneț Stadium, Zorya, Sarata Raion, Odesa Oblast
Referee: Mykola Kryvonosov (Kyiv)

PFC Sumy wins 3–1 on aggregate and remains in First League. FC Balkany Zorya loses but later was promoted to the 2017–18 Ukrainian First League, due to sanctions against FC Dnipro.

== Top goalscorers ==
The season top goalscorers were:

| Rank | Scorer | Team | Goals (Pen.) |
|---|---|---|---|
| 1 | (Ukraine) Ihor Khudobyak | Teplovyk-Prykarpattya Ivano-Frankivsk | 25 (1) |
| 2 | (Ukraine) Roman Bochak | Enerhiya Nova Kakhovka | 22 |
| 2 | (Ukraine) Artem Kozlov | Kremin Kremenchuk | 22 (2) |

== Awards ==
=== Round awards ===
| Round | Player | | | Coach | | |
| Round | Player | Club | Reference | Coach | Club | Reference |
|---|---|---|---|---|---|---|
| Round 21 | (Ukraine) Yuriy Habovda | Rukh Vynnyky | | (Ukraine) Viktor Bohatyr | Myr Hornostayivka | |
| Round 22 | (Ukraine) Mykhailo Shestakov | Zhemchuzhyna Odesa | | (Ukraine) Hryhoriy Varzhelenko | FC Nikopol | |
| Round 23 | (Ukraine) Yevhen Bokhashvili | Rukh Vynnyky | | (Ukraine) Ruslan Mostovyi | Rukh Vynnyky | |
| Round 24 | (Ukraine) Artur Kaskov | Metalurh Zaporizhzhia | | (Ukraine) Denys Kolchin | Zhemchuzhyna Odesa | |
| Round 25 | (Ukraine) Ihor Khudobyak | Teplovyk-Prykarpattia Ivano-Frankivsk | | (Ukraine) Serhiy Yashchenko | Kremin Kremenchuk | |
| Round 26 | (Ukraine) Dmytro Shastal | Enerhiya Nova Kakhovka | | (Ukraine) Oleh Fedorchuk | Enerhiya Nova Kakhovka | |
| Round 27 | (Ukraine) Roman Bochak | Enerhiya Nova Kakhovka | | (Ukraine) Volodymyr Kovalyuk | Teplovyk-Prykarpattia Ivano-Frankivsk | |
| Round 28 | (Georgia (country)) Levan Koshadze | Kremin Kremenchuk | | (Ukraine) Volodymyr Kovalyuk | Teplovyk-Prykarpattia Ivano-Frankivsk | |
| Round 29 | (Ukraine) Ihor Malyarenko | Nyva-V Vinnytsia | | (Ukraine) Volodymyr Horilyi | Nyva-V Vinnytsia | |
| Round 30 | (Ukraine) Serhiy Ursulenko | Balkany Zorya | | (Ukraine) Oleh Fedorchuk | Enerhiya Nova Kakhovka | |
| Round 31 | (Ukraine) Volodymyr Boryshkevych | Teplovyk-Prykarpattia Ivano-Frankivsk | | (Ukraine) Andriy Parkhomenko | Balkany Zorya | |
| Round 32 | (Ukraine) Oleksandr Muzychuk | Podillya Khmelnytskyi | | (Ukraine) Arkadiy Batalov | Podillya Khmelnytskyi | |
| Round 33 | (Ukraine) Roman Bochak | Enerhiya Nova Kakhovka | | (Ukraine) Denys Kolchin | Zhemchuzhyna Odesa | |
| Round 34 | (Ukraine) Stanislav-Nuri Malysh | Zhemchuzhyna Odesa | | (Ukraine) Denys Kolchin | Zhemchuzhyna Odesa | |

=== Season awards ===
The laureates of the 2016–17 season were:

- Best player: (Ukraine) Ihor Khudobyak (Teplovyk-Prykarpattia Ivano-Frankivsk)
- Best coach: (Ukraine) Denys Kolchin (Zhemchuzhyna Odesa)
- Best goalscorer: (Ukraine) Ihor Khudobyak (Teplovyk-Prykarpattia Ivano-Frankivsk)

== See also ==
- 2016–17 Ukrainian Premier League
- 2016–17 Ukrainian First League
- 2016–17 Ukrainian Cup
