= 1966 in Soviet football =

Football in the Soviet Union
- Season: 1966

Men's football
- Class A 1. Group: Dinamo Kiev
- Class A 2. Group: Zaria Lugansk
- Class B: Lokomotiv Kaluga (Russia); Avangard Zheltye Vody (Ukraine); Meshakhte Tkibuli (Union republics); Pamir Leninabad (Central Asia)
- Soviet Cup: Dinamo Kiev

The 1966 Soviet football championship was the 34th seasons of competitive football in the Soviet Union and the 28th among teams of sports societies and factories. Dinamo Kiev won the championship becoming the Soviet domestic champions for the second time.

== Honours ==
Competition	Winner	Runner-up
Class A 1. Group	Dinamo Kiev (2)	SKA Rostov-na-Donu
Class A 2. Group	Zaria Lugansk (2)	Zhalgiris Vilnius
Class B	Lokomotiv Kaluga (Russia)	Spartak Ordzhonikidze (Russia)
Class B	Avangard Zheltye Vody (Ukraine)	Dinamo Khmelnitskiy (Ukraine)
Class B	Meshakhte Tkibuli (Union republics)	Polad Sumgait (Union republics)
Class B	Pamir Leninabad (Central Asia)	Metallurg Chimkent (Central Asia)
Soviet Cup	Dinamo Kiev (3)	Torpedo Moscow

Notes = Number in parentheses is the times that club has won that honour. * indicates new record for competition

== Soviet Union football championship ==
=== Class A First Group ===
Pos	Team	Pld	W	D	L	GF	GA	GD	Pts	Qualification or relegation
1	(Ukrainian Soviet Socialist Republic) Dynamo Kyiv (C)	36	23	10	3	66	17	+49	56	Qualification for European Cup first round
2	(Russian Soviet Federative Socialist Republic) SKA Rostov-on-Don	36	20	7	9	54	44	+10	47	
3	(Azerbaijan Soviet Socialist Republic) Neftyanik Baku	36	18	9	9	56	28	+28	45	
4	(Russian Soviet Federative Socialist Republic) Spartak Moscow	36	15	12	9	45	41	+4	42	
5	(Russian Soviet Federative Socialist Republic) CSKA Moscow	36	16	9	11	60	45	+15	41	
6	(Russian Soviet Federative Socialist Republic) Torpedo Moscow	36	15	10	11	55	39	+16	40	Qualification for Cup Winners' Cup first round
7	(Georgian Soviet Socialist Republic) Dinamo Tbilisi	36	13	14	9	47	34	+13	40	
8	(Russian Soviet Federative Socialist Republic) Dynamo Moscow	36	12	14	10	43	34	+9	38	
9	(Uzbek Soviet Socialist Republic) Pakhtakor Tashkent	36	10	18	8	36	32	+4	38	
10	(Ukrainian Soviet Socialist Republic) Shakhtar Donetsk	36	15	7	14	32	35	−3	37	
11	(Byelorussian Soviet Socialist Republic) Dinamo Minsk	36	11	13	12	36	39	−3	35	
12	(Kazakh Soviet Socialist Republic) Kairat Alma-Ata	36	12	11	13	30	39	−9	35	
13	(Armenian Soviet Socialist Republic) Ararat Yerevan	36	12	10	14	30	45	−15	34	
14	(Ukrainian Soviet Socialist Republic) Chornomorets Odessa	36	10	13	13	29	36	−7	33	
15	(Georgian Soviet Socialist Republic) Torpedo Kutaisi	36	9	10	17	44	59	−15	28	
16	(Russian Soviet Federative Socialist Republic) Zenit Leningrad	36	10	8	18	35	54	−19	28	
17	(Russian Soviet Federative Socialist Republic) Lokomotiv Moscow	36	11	5	20	34	49	−15	27	
18	(Russian Soviet Federative Socialist Republic) Krylya Sovetov Kuybyshev	36	4	17	15	18	40	−22	25	
19	(Ukrainian Soviet Socialist Republic) SKA Odessa (R)	36	1	13	22	16	56	−40	15	Relegation to Class A Second Group

Source: rsssf.com
(C) Champions; (R) Relegated

=== Class A Second Group finals ===
==== For places 1-3 ====
[Oct 25 – Nov 16]

Pos	Rep	Team	Pld	W	D	L	GF	GA	GD	Pts	Promotion
1	UKR	Zarya Lugansk	4	2	2	0	4	1	+3	6	Promoted
2	LTU	Žalgiris Vilnius	4	2	1	1	2	2	0	5	
3	UZB	Politotdel Tashkent Region	4	0	1	3	1	4	−3	1	

==== For places 4-6 ====
[Oct 29 – Nov 14]

Pos	Rep	Team	Pld	W	D	L	GF	GA	GD	Pts
4	KAZ	Shakhtyor Karaganda	4	1	3	0	3	2	+1	5
5	RUS	Textilshchik Ivanovo	4	1	2	1	1	4	−3	4
6	UKR	SKA Kiev	4	1	1	2	6	4	+2	3

Source: rsssf.com

=== Final group ===
[Nov 5–13, Orjonikidze]

Pos	Team	Pld	W	D	L	GF	GA	GD	Pts
1	Lokomotiv Kaluga	3	3	0	0	4	0	+4	6
2	Spartak Orjonikidze	3	2	0	1	5	2	+3	4
3	Metallurg Tula	3	1	0	2	4	5	−1	2
4	Cement Novorossiysk	3	0	0	3	1	7	−6	0

==== Ukraine (playoffs) ====
===== For places 1-2 =====
Dinamo Khmelnitskiy          0-0 1-1 Avangard Zholtyye Vody

Replay

[Nov 25, Kiev] 
Avangard Zholtyye Vody       2-1  Dinamo Khmelnitskiy

==== Union republics finals ====
[Oct 23–30, Tkibuli]

Pos	Rep	Team	Pld	W	D	L	GF	GA	GD	Pts
1	GEO	Meshakhte Tkibuli	3	1	2	0	1	0	+1	4
2	AZE	Polad Sumgait	3	1	1	1	3	2	+1	3
3	BLR	Neman Grodno	3	1	1	1	3	3	0	3
4	ARM	Lernagorts Kafan	3	0	2	1	1	3	−2	2

Source: rsssf.com

==== Central Asia and Kazakhstan ====
Pos	Rep	Team	Pld	W	D	L	GF	GA	GD	Pts
1	TJK	Pamir Leninabad	36	23	7	6	61	25	+36	53
2	KAZ	Metallurg Chimkent	36	19	13	4	60	30	+30	51
3	KAZ	Dinamo Tselinograd	36	19	11	6	57	26	+31	49
4	UZB	Zarafshan Navoi	36	19	8	9	75	40	+35	46
5	KAZ	Metallurg Temirtau	36	18	9	9	39	23	+16	45
6	UZB	Khimik Chirchik	36	18	8	10	51	32	+19	44
7	UZB	Sverdlovets Tashkent Region	36	17	9	10	58	38	+20	43
8	KAZ	ADK Alma-Ata	36	16	10	10	50	37	+13	42
9	UZB	Spartak Andizhan	36	16	9	11	43	32	+11	41
10	KAZ	Metallist Jambul	36	12	16	8	54	40	+14	40
11	KGZ	Shakhtyor Osh	36	13	11	12	28	37	−9	37
12	UZB	Pahtaaral Gulistan	36	12	10	14	37	49	−12	34
13	UZB	Dimitrovets Tashkent Region	36	9	11	16	32	43	−11	29
14	UZB	Spartak Samarkand	36	9	10	17	25	32	−7	28
15	TKM	Zahmet Charjou	36	7	11	18	41	71	−30	25
16	TJK	Pahtakor Kurgan-Tyube	36	7	9	20	30	63	−33	23
17	UZB	Metallurg Almalyk	36	6	10	20	29	57	−28	22
18	TJK	Vakhsh Nurek	36	6	6	24	19	73	−54	18
19	UZB	Buhoro Buhara	36	5	4	27	28	79	−51	14

=== Top goalscorers ===
Class A First Group

- Ilia Datunashvili (Dinamo Tbilisi) – 20 goals
