= 1966–67 Soviet Cup =

1966–67 Cup of USSR in Football
Кубок СССР

Tournament details
- Country: Soviet Union
- Dates: April 23, 1966 – November 8, 1967
- Teams: 85 (final stage)

Final positions
- Champions: Dinamo Moscow
- Runners-up: CSKA Moscow

The 1966–67 Soviet Cup was an association football cup competition of the Soviet Union. The winner of the competition, Dinamo Moscow qualified for the continental tournament.

== Participating teams ==
Enter in Final round		Enter in Qualification round		
Class A		Class B		
Group 1 19/19 teams ✓ Dinamo Kiev; ✓ Dinamo Moscow; ✓ Dinamo Tbilisi; ✓ Dinamo Minsk; ✓ Neftianik Baku; ✓ Shakhter Donetsk; ✓ Spartak Moscow; ✓ Ararat Yerevan; ✓ CSKA Moscow; ✓ SKA Rostov-na-Donu; ✓ Krylya Sovetov Kuibyshev; ✓ Torpedo Moscow; ✓ Torpedo Kutaisi; ✓ Kairat Alma-Ata; ✓ Pakhtakor Tashkent; ✓ Zaria Lugansk; ✓ Lokomotiv Moscow; ✓ Chernomorets Odessa; ✓ Zenit Leningrad	Group 2 57/59 teams ✓ Dinamo Kirovabad; ✓ Daugava Riga; ✓ Kuban Krasnodar; ✓ Rubin Kazan; ✓ Terek Grozny; ✓ Dinamo Leningrad; ✓ Spartak Gomel; ✓ Lokomotiv Tbilisi; ✓ Traktor Volgograd; ✓ Dinamo Stavropol; ✓ Meshakhte Tkibuli; ✓ Spartak Nalchik; ✓ Baltika Kaliningrad; ✓ Tekstilschik Ivanovo; ✓ Zhalgiris Vilnius; ✓ Spartak Ordzhonikidze; ✓ Rostselmash Rostov-na-Donu; ✓ Dinamo Batumi; ✓ Shirak Leninakan; ✓ Dinamo Tallinn ✓ SKA Kiev; ✓ Metallurg Zaporozhye; ✓ SKA Lvov; ✓ Dnepr Dnepropetrovsk; ✓ Moldova Kishinev; ✓ Trud Voronezh; ✓ Karpaty Lvov; ✓ Zvezda Kirovograd; ✓ Metallist Kharkov; ✓ Lokomotiv Vinnitsa; ✓ Shinnik Yaroslavl; ✓ Sudostoitel Nikolayev; ✗ Metallurg Tula; ✓ Sokol Saratov; ✓ Avangard Zheltye Vody; ✓ Volga Gorkiy; ✓ Tavriya Simferopol; ✓ Lokomotiv Kaluga; ✓ SKA Odessa; ✓ Volga Kalinin ✓ Shakhter Karaganda; ✓ Uralmash Sverdlovsk; ✗ Alga Frunze; ✓ Stroitel Ashkhabad; ✓ Luch Vladivostok; ✓ SKA Khabarovsk; ✓ Energetik Dushanbe; ✓ Politodel Tashkent Oblast; ✓ Temp Barnaul; ✓ Neftianik Fergana; ✓ Irtysh Omsk; ✓ Lokomotiv Chelyabinsk; ✓ SKA Novosibirsk; ✓ Torpedo Tomsk; ✓ Stroitel Ufa; ✓ Pamir Leninabad; ✓ Zvezda Perm; ✓ Vostok Ust-Kamenogorsk; ✓ Kuzbass Kemerovo	RSFSR I (1966 – 17/17) ✓ Lokomotiv Kaluga; ✓ Metallurg Tula; ✓ Spartak Oryol; ✓ Neman Grodno; ✓ Znamia Truda Orekhovo-Zuyevo; ✓ Zvezda Serpukhov; ✓ Granitas Klapeida; ✓ Khimik Novomoskovsk; ✓ Spartak Mogilyov; ✓ Avangard Kolomna; ✓ Spartak Brest; ✓ Zveiniyeks Liyepaya; ✓ Spartak Ryazan; ✓ Dinamo Briansk; ✓ Znamia Noginsk; ✓ Iskra Smolensk; ✓ Dvina Vitebsk	RSFSR II (1966 – 17/18) ✓ Traktor Vladimir; ✓ Tekmash Kostroma; ✓ Saturn Rybinsk; ✓ Avtomobilist Leningrad; ✓ Volga Ulyanovsk; ✓ Metallurg Lipetsk; ✓ Metallurg Cherepovets; ✓ Torpedo Lyubertsy; ✓ Onezhets Petrozavodsk; ✓ Torpedo Pavlovo; ✓ Kovrovets Kovrov; ✓ Sever Murmansk; ✓ Spartak Saransk; ✓ Dinamo Vologda; ✓ Khimik Dzerzhinsk; ✓ Torpedo Podolsk; ✓ Velozavodets Penza; ✗ Khimik Klin	RSFSR III (1966 – 18/18) ✓ Metallurg Kuibyshev; ✓ Torpedo Taganrog; ✓ Polad Sumgait; ✓ Volgar Astrakhan; ✓ Energiya Volzhskiy; ✓ Lokomotiv Baku; ✓ Trud Kursk; ✓ Torpedo Armavir; ✓ Progress Kamensk-Shakhtinskiy; ✓ Tyazhmash Syzran; ✓ Trud Toliatti; ✓ Kalitva Belaya Kalitva; ✓ Shakhter Shakhty; ✓ Spartak Belgorod; ✓ Energiya Novocherkassk; ✓ Spartak Tambov; ✓ Tekstilschik Mingechaur; ✓ Khimik Balakovo
Group 1 19/19 teams ✓ Dinamo Kiev; ✓ Dinamo Moscow; ✓ Dinamo Tbilisi; ✓ Dinamo Minsk; ✓ Neftianik Baku; ✓ Shakhter Donetsk; ✓ Spartak Moscow; ✓ Ararat Yerevan; ✓ CSKA Moscow; ✓ SKA Rostov-na-Donu; ✓ Krylya Sovetov Kuibyshev; ✓ Torpedo Moscow; ✓ Torpedo Kutaisi; ✓ Kairat Alma-Ata; ✓ Pakhtakor Tashkent; ✓ Zaria Lugansk; ✓ Lokomotiv Moscow; ✓ Chernomorets Odessa; ✓ Zenit Leningrad		RSFSR IV (1966 – 19/20) ✓ Spartak Ordzhonikidze; ✓ Lernagorts Kafan; ✓ Meshakhte Tkibuli; ✓ Tsement Novorossiysk; ✓ Metallurg Rustavi; ✗ Spartak Kislovodsk; ✓ Mashinostroitel Pyatigorsk; ✓ Alazani Gurdzhaani; ✓ Lori Kirovakan; ✓ Urozhai Maikop; ✓ Dila Gori; ✓ Urozhai Krymsk; ✓ Dinamo Sukhumi; ✓ Kolkhida Poti; ✓ Inguri Zugdidi; ✓ Dinamo Makhachkala; ✓ Sevan Oktemberyan; ✓ Araks Yerevan; ✓ Uralan Elista; ✓ Urozhai Derbent	RSFSR V (1966 – 17/17) ✓ Kalininets Sverdlovsk; ✓ Spartak Yoshkar-Ola; ✓ Metallurg Magnitogorsk; ✓ Neftianik Bugulma; ✓ Neftianik Tyumen; ✓ Metallurg Zlatoust; ✓ Zenit Izhevsk; ✓ Khimik Salavat; ✓ Lokomotiv Orenburg; ✓ Uralets Nizhniy Tagil; ✓ Dinamo Kirov; ✓ Chaika Zelenodolsk; ✓ Kauchuk Sterlitamak; ✓ Khimik Berezniki; ✓ Torpedo Miass; ✓ Energiya Cheboksary; ✓ Trud Kurgan	RSFSR VI (1966 – 16/16) ✓ Lokomotiv Krasnoyarsk; ✓ Selenga Ulan-Ude; ✓ Okean Vladivostok; ✓ Start Angarsk; ✓ Shakhter Prokopyevsk; ✓ Avangard Komsomolsk-na-Amure; ✓ Metallurg Novokuznetsk; ✓ Tsementnik Semipalatinsk; ✓ Rybak Nakhodka; ✓ Angara Irkutsk; ✓ Irtysh Pavlodar; ✓ Zabaikalets Chita; ✓ Torpedo Rubtsovsk; ✓ Amur Blagoveschensk; ✓ Progress Biysk; ✓ Shakhter Kiselyovsk
Group 1 19/19 teams ✓ Dinamo Kiev; ✓ Dinamo Moscow; ✓ Dinamo Tbilisi; ✓ Dinamo Minsk; ✓ Neftianik Baku; ✓ Shakhter Donetsk; ✓ Spartak Moscow; ✓ Ararat Yerevan; ✓ CSKA Moscow; ✓ SKA Rostov-na-Donu; ✓ Krylya Sovetov Kuibyshev; ✓ Torpedo Moscow; ✓ Torpedo Kutaisi; ✓ Kairat Alma-Ata; ✓ Pakhtakor Tashkent; ✓ Zaria Lugansk; ✓ Lokomotiv Moscow; ✓ Chernomorets Odessa; ✓ Zenit Leningrad		Ukraine I (1966 – 20/20) ✓ Dinamo Khmelnitskiy; ✓ Desna Chernigov; ✓ SKCF Sevastopol; ✓ Lokomotiv Donetsk; ✓ Kolos Poltava; ✓ Shakhter Kadiyevka; ✓ Krivbass Krivoi Rog; ✓ Shakhter Aleksandriya; ✓ Avangard Kramatorsk; ✓ Polissia Zhytomyr; ✓ Kolgospnik Rovno; ✓ Volyn Lutsk; ✓ Trubnik Nikopol; ✓ Dunayets Izmail; ✓ Avangard Makeyeka; ✓ Neftianik Drogobich; ✓ Spartak Melitopol; ✓ Kommunarets Kommunarsk; ✓ Avtomobilist Odessa; ✓ Start Dzerzhinsk	Ukraine II (1966 – 20/20) ✓ Avangard Zheltye Vody; ✓ Lokomotiv Kherson; ✓ Dnepr Kremenchuk; ✓ Spartak Ivano-Frankovsk; ✓ Chaika Sevastopol; ✓ Khimik Severodonetsk; ✓ Shakhter Gorlovka; ✓ Torpedo Kharkov; ✓ Spartak Sumy; ✓ Bukovina Chernovtsy; ✓ Avangard Kerch; ✓ Kolgospnik Cherkassy; ✓ Dneprovets Dneprodzerzhinsk; ✓ Avangard Ternopol; ✓ Torpedo Berdyansk; ✓ Azovets Zhdanov; ✓ Verkhovina Uzhgorod; ✓ Shakhter Torez; ✓ Shakhter Yanakievo; ✓ Shakhter Krasny Luch	Central Asia and Kazakhstan (22/22) ✓ Zarafshan Navoi; ✓ Sverdlovets Tashkent Oblast; ✓ Metallurg Temirtau; ✓ Sogdiana Samarkand; ✓ Dinamo Tselinograd; ✓ Metallurg Chimkent; ✓ Pakhtaaral Syrdarya Oblast; ✓ ADK Alma-Ata; ✓ Vakhsh Nurek; ✗ Ok Oltyn Andizhan Oblast; ✓ Alay Osh; ✓ Spartak Andizhan; ✓ Khimik Chirchik; ✓ Akkurgan Tashkent Oblast; ✗ Tselinnik Yangiyer; ✓ Zakhmed Chardzhou; ✓ Pakhtakor Kurgan-Tyube; ✗ Enbek Dzhezkazgan; ✓ Metallurg Almalyk; ✓ Voskhod Dzhambul; ✓ Fakel Bukhara; ✗ Murgab Mary

Source: []

Notes

- The underlined are marked teams that entered the competition in 1967 for the second time, but initially in 1966 they competed as part of the 1966 Soviet Class B qualification (preliminary) stage within the RSFSR or UkrSSR zones.

== Competition schedule ==
=== Preliminary stage ===
==== Group 1 (Russian Federation) ====
===== Preliminary round =====
SPARTAK Mogilyov              2-1  Spartak Oryol

===== First round =====
AVANGARD Kolomna              1-0  Znamya Noginsk 
DINAMO Bryansk                1-0  Spartak Mogilyov 
GRANITAS Klaipeda             2-0  Khimik Novomoskovsk 
LOKOMOTIV Kaluga              1-0  Spartak Brest 
METALLURG Tula                1-0  Neman Grodno 
Spartak Ryazan                1-2  ISKRA Smolensk 
ZNAMYA TRUDA Orekhovo-Zuyevo  3-1  Zvejnieks Liepaja 
ZVEZDA Serpukhov              4-0  Dvina Vitebsk

===== Quarterfinals =====
AVANGARD Kolomna              1-0  Zvezda Serpukhov 
LOKOMOTIV Kaluga              1-0  Dinamo Bryansk 
METALLURG Tula                2-0  Granitas Klaipeda 
ZNAMYA TRUDA Orekhovo-Zuyevo  2-1  Iskra Smolensk

===== Semifinals =====
LOKOMOTIV Kaluga              4-0  Metallurg Tula 
Znamya Truda Orekhovo-Zuyevo  1-1  Avangard Kolomna

====== Semifinals replays ======
ZNAMYA TRUDA Orekhovo-Zuyevo  3-1  Avangard Kolomna

===== Final =====
Lokomotiv Kaluga              0-2  ZNAMYA TRUDA Orekhovo-Zuyevo

==== Group 2 (Russian Federation) ====
===== Preliminary round =====
KOVROVETS Kovrov              1-0  Dinamo Vologda              [aet]

===== First round =====
Khimik Dzerzhinsk             1-2  METALLURG Lipetsk 
ONEZHETS Petrozavodsk         3-0  Velozavodets Penza 
SEVER Murmansk                4-2  Spartak Saransk 
TEKMASH Kostroma              1-0  Torpedo Lyubertsy 
Torpedo Pavlovo               0-0  Kovrovets Kovrov 
Torpedo Podolsk               0-1  SATURN Rybinsk 
TRAKTOR Vladimir              1-0  Metallurg Cherepovets 
Volga Ulyanovsk               1-1  Avtomobilist Leningrad

====== First round replays ======
TORPEDO Pavlovo               3-0  Kovrovets Kovrov 
VOLGA Ulyanovsk               2-1  Avtomobilist Leningrad

===== Quarterfinals =====
Metallurg Lipetsk             0-1  TRAKTOR Vladimir 
SATURN Rybinsk                2-1  TekMash Kostroma 
Sever Murmansk                1-2  ONEZHETS Petrozavodsk 
VOLGA Ulyanovsk               3-0  Torpedo Pavlovo

===== Semifinals =====
ONEZHETS Petrozavodsk         2-1  Volga Ulyanovsk 
SATURN Rybinsk                1-0  Traktor Vladimir

===== Final =====
ONEZHETS Petrozavodsk         2-0  Saturn Rybinsk

==== Group 3 (Russian Federation) ====
===== Preliminary round =====
Spartak Belgorod              1-2  KHIMIK Balakovo 
Textilshchik Mingechaur       0-1  TRUD Togliatti

===== First round =====
ENERGIYA Volzhskiy            1-0  Torpedo Taganrog 
KALITVA Belaya Kalitva        1-0  Trud Kursk 
LOKOMOTIV Baku                1-0  Trud Togliatti 
Polad Sumgait                 1-1  Metallurg Kuibyshev 
PROGRESS Kamensk              5-1  Khimik Balakovo 
Shakhtyor Shakhty             0-0  Spartak Tambov 
TORPEDO Armavir               2-0  TyazhMash Syzran 
VOLGAR Astrakhan              6-1  Energiya Novocherkassk

====== First round replays ======
POLAD Sumgait                 3-0  Metallurg Kuibyshev 
SHAKHTYOR Shakhty             3-2  Spartak Tambov

===== Quarterfinals =====
Polad Sumgait                 1-1  Lokomotiv Baku 
PROGRESS Kamensk              1-0  Kalitva Belaya Kalitva 
SHAKHTYOR Shakhty             1-0  Energiya Volzhskiy 
VOLGAR Astrakhan              2-1  Torpedo Armavir

====== Quarterfinals replays ======
POLAD Sumgait                 3-0  Lokomotiv Baku

===== Semifinals =====
SHAKHTYOR Shakhty             3-2  Progress Kamensk            [aet] 
VOLGAR Astrakhan              1-0  Polad Sumgait

===== Final =====
Volgar Astrakhan              1-2  SHAKHTYOR Shakhty

==== Group 4 (Russian Federation) ====
===== Preliminary round =====
LORI Kirovakan                1-0  Lernagorts Kafan 
MESHAKHTE Tkibuli             3-0  Dila Gori 
SEVAN Oktemberyan             2-0  Araks Yerevan

===== First round =====
Alazani Gurjaani              1-1  Meshakhte Tkibuli 
CEMENT Novorossiysk           3-1  Mashuk Pyatigorsk 
DINAMO Makhachkala            5-1  Urozhai Derbent 
DINAMO Sukhumi                6-0  Metallurg Rustavi 
INGURI Zugdidi                4-1  Kolkhida Poti 
LORI Kirovakan                3-1  Sevan Oktemberyan 
UROZHAI Krymsk                1-0  Spartak Orjonikidze 
UROZHAI Maykop                7-1  Uralan Elista

====== First round replays ======
ALAZANI Gurjaani              w/o  Meshakhte Tkibuli

===== Quarterfinals =====
CEMENT Novorossiysk           4-1  Urozhai Krymsk 
DINAMO Makhachkala            2-1  Urozhai Maykop 
DINAMO Sukhumi                2-1  Lori Kirovakan              [aet] 
INGURI Zugdidi                2-0  Alazani Gurjaani

===== Semifinals =====
DINAMO Makhachkala            2-1  Dinamo Sukhumi 
Inguri Zugdidi                1-2  CEMENT Novorossiysk

===== Final =====
CEMENT Novorossiysk           4-3  Dinamo Makhachkala

==== Group 5 (Russian Federation) ====
===== Preliminary round =====
KAUCHUK Sterlitamak 1-0 Dinamo Kirov

===== First round =====
CHAIKA Zelyonodolsk           3-2  Trud Kurgan 
ENERGIYA Cheboksary           3-0  Neftyanik Tyumen 
KHIMIK Berezniki              4-2  Metallurg Magnitogorsk      [aet] 
Khimik Salavat                0-0  Kauchuk Sterlitamak 
LOKOMOTIV Orenburg            3-1  Strela Sverdlovsk 
METALLURG Zlatoust            w/o  Zenit Izhevsk 
NEFTYANIK Bugulma             1-0  Spartak Yoshkar-Ola         [aet] 
URALETS Nizhniy Tagil         1-0  Torpedo Miass

====== First round replays ======
KHIMIK Salavat                1-0  Kauchuk Sterlitamak

===== Quarterfinals =====
CHAIKA Zelyonodolsk           3-1  Energiya Cheboksary 
Lokomotiv Orenburg            1-2  NEFTYANIK Bugulma           [aet] 
METALLURG Zlatoust            3-1  Khimik Salavat 
URALETS Nizhniy Tagil         7-0  Khimik Berezniki

===== Semifinals =====
CHAIKA Zelyonodolsk           w/o  Neftyanik Bugulma 
URALETS Nizhniy Tagil         1-0  Metallurg Zlatoust

===== Final =====
CHAIKA Zelyonodolsk           1-0  Uralets Nizhniy Tagil

==== Group 6 (Russian Federation) ====
===== Preliminary round =====
CEMENTNIK Semipalatinsk       2-1  Shakhtyor Kiselyovsk

===== First round =====
ANGARA Irkutsk                2-0  Progress Biysk 
AVANGARD Komsomolsk-na-Amure  1-0  Zabaikalets Chita 
IRTYSH Pavlodar               2-1  Cementnik Semipalatinsk 
LOKOMOTIV Krasnoyarsk         3-1  Metallurg Novokuznetsk 
Rybak Nakhodka                1-1  Amur Blagoveshchensk 
SELENGA Ulan-Ude              1-0  Okean Vladivostok 
SHAKHTYOR Prokopyevsk         1-0  Torpedo Rubtsovsk           [aet]

====== First round replays ======
RYBAK Nakhodka                3-1  Amur Blagoveshchensk

===== Quarterfinals =====
AVANGARD Komsomolsk-na-Amure  3-0  Angara Irkutsk 
SELENGA Ulan-Ude              3-1  Rybak Nakhodka 
Shakhtyor Prokopyevsk         1-2  IRTYSH Pavlodar 
Start Angarsk                 0-2  LOKOMOTIV Krasnoyarsk

===== Semifinals =====
IRTYSH Pavlodar               2-1  Lokomotiv Krasnoyarsk 
SELENGA Ulan-Ude              1-0  Avangard Komsomolsk-na-Amure

===== Final =====
Selenga Ulan-Ude              0-0  Irtysh Pavlodar

====== Replay ======
SELENGA Ulan-Ude              1-0  Irtysh Pavlodar             [aet]

==== Group 1 (Ukraine) ====
===== Preliminary round =====
DUNAYETS Izmail               4-3  Avtomobilist Odessa         [aet] 
Kolos Poltava                 1-2  KRIVBASS Krivoi Rog         [aet] 
SHAKHTYOR Alexandria          3-1  Trubnik Nikopol 
SPARTAK Melitopol             2-0  SKF Sevastopol

===== First round =====
Avangard Makeyevka            0-0  Avangard Kramatorsk 
Desna Chernigov               0-1  POLESYE Zhitomir 
DUNAYETS Izmail               2-0  Spartak Melitopol 
KRIVBASS Krivoi Rog           2-0  Shakhtyor Alexandria 
NEFTYANIK Drogobych           3-1  Dinamo Khmelnitskiy 
Shakhtyor Kadiyevka           2-3  KOMMUNARETS Kommunarsk 
START Dzerzhinsk              2-0  Lokomotiv Donetsk 
Volyn Lutsk                   1-2  KOLHOSPNIK Rovno

====== First round replays ======
Avangard Makeyevka            1-3  AVANGARD Kramatorsk         [aet]

===== Quarterfinals =====
AVANGARD Kramatorsk           3-2  Krivbass Krivoi Rog 
KOLHOSPNIK Rovno              3-1  Neftyanik Drogobych 
POLESYE Zhitomir              2-1  Dunayets Izmail 
Start Dzerzhinsk              1-2  KOMMUNARETS Kommunarsk

===== Semifinals =====
KOMMUNARETS Kommunarsk        4-3  Avangard Kramatorsk 
POLESYE Zhitomir              2-0  Kolhospnik Rovno

===== Final =====
POLESYE Zhitomir              2-0  Kommunarets Kommunarsk

==== Group 2 (Ukraine) ====
===== Preliminary round =====
Khimik Severodonetsk          2-3  SHAKHTYOR Krasny Luch 
Kolhospnik Cherkassy          0-1  DNEPR Kremenchug 
Lokomotiv Kherson             1-2  AVANGARD Zholtyye Vody 
Torpedo Berdyansk             0-3  AZOVETS Zhdanov

===== First round =====
Avangard Ternopol             0-1  VERKHOVINA Uzhgorod 
AVANGARD Zholtyye Vody        2-0  Azovets Zhdanov 
CHAIKA Sevastopol             4-1  Avangard Kerch              [aet] 
DNEPR Kremenchug              3-1  Shakhtyor Krasny Luch 
DNEPROVETS Dneprodzerzhinsk   1-0  Shakhtyor Gorlovka 
SHAKHTYOR Torez               2-1  Shakhtyor Yenakiyevo 
SPARTAK Ivano-Frankovsk       2-1  Bukovina Chernovtsy 
SPARTAK Sumy                  1-0  Torpedo Kharkov

===== Quarterfinals =====
AVANGARD Zholtyye Vody        4-0  Spartak Sumy 
CHAIKA Sevastopol             3-1  Dneprovets Dneprodzerzhinsk 
DNEPR Kremenchug              3-2  Shakhtyor Torez 
VERKHOVINA Uzhgorod           5-2  Spartak Ivano-Frankovsk

===== Semifinals =====
AVANGARD Zholtyye Vody        1-0  Verkhovina Uzhgorod 
Chaika Sevastopol             0-1  DNEPR Kremenchug

===== Final =====
DNEPR Kremenchug              2-1  Avangard Zholtyye Vody

==== Group Central Asia and Kazakhstan ====
===== Preliminary round =====
Pahtaaral Gulistan            0-1  KHIMIK Chirchik 
ZAHMET Charjou                3-1  Fakel Buhara

===== First round =====
ADK Alma-Ata                  1-2  SVERDLOVETS Tashkent Region 
Akkurgan Tashkent Region      1-2  SPARTAK Andizhan 
ALAY Osh                      3-2  Pahtakor Kurgan-Tyube 
Dinamo Tselinograd            1-1  Sogdiana Samarkand 
Khimik Chirchik               0-0  Zarafshan Navoi 
METALLURG Almalyk             2-0  Zahmet Charjou 
Metallurg Chimkent            1-2  METALLURG Temirtau 
Voskhod Jambul                0-3  VAKHSH Nurek

====== First round replays ======
DINAMO Tselinograd            1-0  Sogdiana Samarkand 
KHIMIK Chirchik               2-0  Zarafshan Navoi

===== Quarterfinals =====
Metallurg Almalyk             1-1  Dinamo Tselinograd 
METALLURG Temirtau            2-1  Sverdlovets Tashkent Region 
SPARTAK Andizhan              2-0  Alay Osh                    [aet] 
VAKHSH Nurek                  3-1  Khimik Chirchik

====== Quarterfinals replays ======
Metallurg Almalyk             0-1  DINAMO Tselinograd          [aet]

===== Semifinals =====
SPARTAK Andizhan              3-2  Dinamo Tselinograd          [aet] 
Vakhsh Nurek                  1-2  METALLURG Temirtau

===== Final =====
Spartak Andizhan              1-1  Metallurg Temirtau

====== Replay ======
SPARTAK Andizhan              1-0  Metallurg Temirtau

=== Final stage ===
==== Preliminary round ====
[Apr 9] 
AVTOMOBILIST Zhitomir         2-0  Vostok Ust-Kamenogorsk 
BALTIKA Kaliningrad           w/o  SKA Novosibirsk 
DNEPR Kremenchug              w/o  RostSelMash Rostov-na-Donu  
LUCH Vladivostok              w/o  Metallurg Zaporozhye 
METALLIST Kharkov             1-0  Spartak Andizhan 
SHAKHTYOR Shakhty             w/o  Stroitel Ashkhabad 
SHINNIK Yaroslavl             w/o  Energetik Dushanbe 
SPARTAK Nalchik               2-1  Neftyanik Fergana 
TAVRIA Simferopol             3-0  Kuban Krasnodar 
TEREK Grozny                  2-1  SKA Lvov 
TRUD Voronezh                 1-0  SKA Kiev 
UralMash Sverdlovsk           1-1  Žalgiris Vilnius 
Znamya Truda Orekhovo-Zuyevo  0-1  SPARTAK Gomel 
ZVEZDA Kirovograd             2-1  SKA Odessa                  [aet]

==== Preliminary round replays ====
[Apr 10] 
URALMASH Sverdlovsk           1-0  Žalgiris Vilnius

==== First round ====
[Apr 20] 
AVTOMOBILIST Zhitomir         4-1  Baltika Kaliningrad 
  [? – Richard Milevich] 
CEMENT Novorossiysk           2-1  Shakhtyor Karaganda         [aet] 
Chaika Zelyonodolsk           2-2  Daugava Riga 
  [? – Gunars Ulmanis-2] 
DINAMO Kirovabad              2-0  Torpedo Tomsk 
Dinamo Stavropol              0-2  SUDOSTROITEL Nikolayev 
  [Yevgeniy Derevyaga, Yevgeniy Dannecker] 
DINAMO Tallinn                w/o  Shirak Leninakan 
DNEPR Kremenchug              2-0  Volga Gorkiy 
KUZBASS Kemerovo              2-1  Politotdel Tashkent Region 
  [Nikolai Chernomyrdin-2 - ?] 
LOKOMOTIV Chelyabinsk         w/o  Avangard Zholtyye Vody 
Metallist Kharkov             0-1  TEREK Grozny 
MOLDOVA Kishinev              w/o  Irtysh Omsk 
Onezhets Petrozavodsk         1-2  LOKOMOTIV Vinnitsa 
PAMIR Leninabad               2-0  Dnepr Dnepropetrovsk 
RUBIN Kazan                   2-1  Lokomotiv Kaluga 
 [Nikolai Vorobyov, Vyacheslav Bulavin - ?] 
SELENGA Ulan-Ude              w/o  Meshakhte Tkibuli 
Shakhtyor Shakhty             0-0  Trud Voronezh 
Shinnik Yaroslavl             0-1  TAVRIA Simferopol 
SOKOL Saratov                 4-0  Spartak Orjonikidze 
Spartak Gomel                 1-1  SKA Khabarovsk 
  [Anatoliy Zhukov 16 – Boris Kopeikin 8] 
SPARTAK Nalchik               1-0  UralMash Sverdlovsk 
TEMP Barnaul                  3-1  Dinamo Batumi 
  [Vladimir Markin 6, Boris Brykin 34, 85 – ?] 
Textilshchik Ivanovo          0-1  KARPATY Lvov 
  [Vladimir Meshcheryakov 59] 
TRAKTOR Volgograd             3-2  Dinamo Leningrad 
VOLGA Kalinin                 2-1  Stroitel Ufa 
  [Lev Gorshkov, Yuriy Khromov – Vladimir Varbuzov] 
ZVEZDA Kirovograd             w/o  Luch Vladivostok 
ZVEZDA Perm                   w/o  Lokomotiv Tbilisi

===== First round replays =====
[Apr 21] 
CHAIKA Zelyonodolsk           1-0  Daugava Riga                [aet] 
Shakhtyor Shakhty             0-2  TRUD Voronezh 
SPARTAK Gomel                 1-0  SKA Khabarovsk 
  [Boris Vasilyev 17]

==== Second round ====
[May 11] 
Cement Novorossiysk           2-2  Dinamo Kirovabad 
DNEPR Kremenchug              2-1  Spartak Nalchik 
Karpaty Lvov                  0-1  LOKOMOTIV Chelyabinsk       [aet] 
LOKOMOTIV Vinnitsa            2-0  Moldova Kishinev 
Rubin Kazan                   0-0  Traktor Volgograd 
SOKOL Saratov                 5-0  Selenga Ulan-Ude 
Sudostroitel Nikolayev        0-1  KUZBASS Kemerovo 
  [Vladimir Razdayev] 
TAVRIA Simferopol             2-0  Avtomobilist Zhitomir 
TEMP Barnaul                  2-0  Dinamo Tallinn 
  [Vladimir Markin 3 pen, Viktor Sadovnikov 39] 
Terek Grozny                  2-2  Spartak Gomel 
  [? – Boris Vasilyev, Nikolai Mishin] 
TRUD Voronezh                 2-1  Zvezda Kirovograd 
VOLGA Kalinin                 4-1  Chaika Zelyonodolsk 
ZVEZDA Perm                   3-1  Pamir Leninabad

===== Second round replays =====
[May 12] 
Cement Novorossiysk           0-1  DINAMO Kirovabad            [aet] 
RUBIN Kazan                   3-0  Traktor Volgograd 
TEREK Grozny                  1-0  Spartak Gomel

==== Third round ====
[May 19] 
Dinamo Kirovabad              1-1  Chernomorets Odessa 
  [Valeriy Stupin – Ishtvan Sekech] 
Dnepr Kremenchug              0-2  DINAMO Kiev 
  [Vladimir Shchegolkov 20, Yozhef Sabo 83] 
Krylya Sovetov Kuibyshev      0-1  DINAMO Tbilisi              [aet] 
  [Slava Metreveli] 
KUZBASS Kemerovo              2-1  SKA Rostov-na-Donu 
  [Vladimir Akuzin, Vitaliy Razdayev – Nikolai Polshchikov] 
Lokomotiv Chelyabinsk         0-2  NEFTYANIK Baku 
  [Rafik Ali-zade, Ruslan Abdullayev] 
LOKOMOTIV Moskva              4-0  Torpedo Kutaisi 
  [Valeriy Sheludko-2, Vladimir Korotkov, Boris Petrov] 
Lokomotiv Vinnitsa            0-2  PAHTAKOR Tashkent 
  [Berador Abduraimov-2] 
RUBIN Kazan                   3-0  Zenit Leningrad 
  [Alexei Biryuchevskiy 9, Viktor Teterkin 11, Nikolai Vorobyov 43] 
Sokol Saratov                 1-1  Spartak Moskva 
  [Yuriy Smirnov 69 – Yuriy Falin 13] 
Tavria Simferopol             0-3  CSKA Moskva 
  [Nikolai Antonevich 20, Vladimir Polikarpov 41, Vladimir Fedotov 83] 
Temp Barnaul                  0-1  KAYRAT Alma-Ata 
  [Oleg Volokh] 
Terek Grozny                  0-1  SHAKHTYOR Donetsk 
  [Valeriy Lobanovskiy 67] 
Trud Voronezh                 0-0  Dinamo Moskva 
Volga Kalinin                 0-1  TORPEDO Moskva 
  [Alexandr Lenyov] 
Zarya Lugansk                 1-1  Dinamo Minsk 
  [Alexandr Bankovskiy 69 – Veniamin Arzamastsev 15] 
ZVEZDA Perm                   3-1  Ararat Yerevan 
  [? – Seiran Galstyan]

===== Third round replays =====
[May 20] 
Dinamo Kirovabad              0-1  CHERNOMORETS Odessa 
  [Viktor Miroshin 18] 
SOKOL Saratov                 1-0  Spartak Moskva 
  [Viktor Chernyshkov 58] 
Trud Voronezh                 1-4  DINAMO Moskva 
  [Vladimir Yanishevskiy 16 – Viktor Votolovskiy 14, 40, Yuriy Vshivtsev 44, Boris Kokh 69] 
Zarya Lugansk                 0-2  DINAMO Minsk 
  [Anatoliy Vasilyev 65, Mikhail Mustygin 85]

==== Fourth round ====
[Jul 7] 
CSKA Moskva             3-0  Dinamo Kiev 
  [Vladimir Kaplichny 21, Vladimir Polikarpov ?, 65] 
NEFTYANIK Baku          2-1  Dinamo Tbilisi 
  [? – Mikhail Meskhi] 
PAHTAKOR Tashkent       1-0  Dinamo Minsk 
  [Hamid Rahmatullayev 35] 
Shakhtyor Donetsk       2-3  DINAMO Moskva            [aet] 
  [Petras Glodenis 26, Oleg Bazilevich 91 – Gennadiy Gusarov 29, Viktor Anichkin 93, Valeriy Maslov 120] 
TORPEDO Moskva          4-0  Kuzbass Kemerovo 
  [Eduard Streltsov 17, Gennadiy Shalimov 27, Vladimir Shcherbakov 44, Alexandr Lenyov 83 pen] 
[Jul 8] 
CHERNOMORETS Odessa     3-1  Rubin Kazan 
  [Vladimir Sak 20, 62, Vasiliy Moskalenko 30 pen – Alexei Biryuchevskiy 82] 
Kayrat Alma-Ata         0-2  SOKOL Saratov 
  [Boris Filipenko 54, Vyacheslav Pashovkin 60] 
LOKOMOTIV Moskva        3-0  Zvezda Perm 
  [Boris Petrov 9, Vladimir Mikhailov 10, Vladimir Basalayev 16]

==== Quarterfinals ====
[Aug 18] 
CSKA Moskva             2-1  Lokomotiv Moskva 
  [Taras Shulyatitskiy 20 pen, Anatoliy Maslyayev 70 – Boris Petrov 45] 
NEFTYANIK Baku          3-2  Pahtakor Tashkent 
  [Eduard Markarov-2, Valeriy Gajiyev – Gennadiy Krasnitskiy-2] 
[Aug 19] 
SOKOL Saratov           3-1  Chernomorets Odessa      [aet] 
  [Vyacheslav Pashovkin 53, 112, Viktor Lipatov 94 – Viktor Zubkov 66] 
Torpedo Moskva          0-1  DINAMO Moskva 
  [Valeriy Maslov 90]

==== Semifinals ====
[Sep 15] 
CSKA Moskva             0-0  Neftyanik Baku 
[Sep 16] 
DINAMO Moskva           4-0  Sokol Saratov 
  [Vladimir Kozlov 4, Gennadiy Yevryuzhikhin 35, Viktor Votolovskiy 74, 77]

===== Semifinals replays =====
[Sep 16] 
CSKA Moskva             2-0  Neftyanik Baku 
  [Vladimir Fedotov, Vladimir Dudarenko]

==== Final ====
8 November 1967

Dinamo Moscow	3 – 0	CSKA Moscow
Gusarov 11'; Vshivtsev 43'; Anichkin 76'	Report

Lenin's Central Stadium, Moscow
Attendance: 80,000
Referee: Sergey Alimov (Moscow)
