= 1966 Soviet Class A Second Group =

Soviet Class A Second Group
- Season: 1966
- Champions: FK Žalgiris Vilnius FC Zaria Lugansk Politotdel Tashkent Region
- Promoted: FC Zaria Lugansk

The 1966 Soviet Class A Second Group was the fourth season of the Soviet Class A Second Group football competitions that was established in 1963. It was also the 26th season of the Soviet second-tier league competition. The competitions became again split completely by geographical principle as before the 1963 league's consolidation reform.

== First stage ==
=== First subgroup ===
Pos	Rep	Team	Pld	W	D	L	GF	GA	GD	Pts
1	LTU	Žalgiris Vilnius	32	18	7	7	45	23	+22	43
2	RUS	Textilshchik Ivanovo	32	13	15	4	52	26	+26	39 (Note: 2 points deducted?)
3	RUS	Kuban Krasnodar	32	15	9	8	46	19	+27	39
4	AZE	Dinamo Kirovabad	32	12	15	5	35	17	+18	39
5	RUS	Rubin Kazan	32	15	9	8	32	23	+9	39
6	LVA	Daugava Riga	32	13	10	9	43	32	+11	36
7	GEO	Lokomotiv Tbilisi	32	12	12	8	43	38	+5	36
8	RUS	Terek Grozny	32	11	11	10	26	28	−2	33
9	GEO	Dinamo Batumi	32	12	8	12	35	36	−1	32
10	RUS	Spartak Nalchik	32	12	8	12	26	33	−7	32
11	RUS	RostSelMash Rostov-na-Donu	32	8	13	11	37	42	−5	29
12	RUS	Traktor Volgograd	32	10	9	13	31	37	−6	29
13	RUS	Dinamo Stavropol	32	8	11	13	24	32	−8	27
14	RUS	Baltika Kaliningrad	32	8	10	14	20	32	−12	26
15	BLR	Spartak Gomel	32	7	12	13	16	29	−13	26
16	ARM	Shirak Leninakan	32	7	8	17	25	55	−30	22
17	EST	Dinamo Tallinn	32	4	7	21	16	50	−34	15

==== Top scorers ====
14 goals

- Zhak Suprikyan (Shirak Leninakan)

13 goals

- Bondo Giorgadze (Dinamo Batumi)
- Anatoliy Mironov (Kuban Krasnodar)

==== Number of teams by republics ====
Number	Union republics	Team(s)
9	Russian SFSR	FC Tekstilschik Ivanovo, FC Kuban Krasnodar, FC Rubin Kazan, FC Terek Grozny, FC Spartak Nalchik, FC Rostselmash Rostov-na-Donu, FC Traktor Volgograd, FC Dinamo Stavropol, FC Baltika Kaliningrad
2	Georgian SSR	FC Lokomotivi Tbilisi, FC Dinamo Batumi
1	Lithuanian SSR	FK Žalgiris Vilnius
1	Azerbaijan SSR	FC Dinamo Kirovabad
1	Latvian SSR	FC Daugava Riga
1	Belarusian SSR	FC Spartak Gomel
1	Armenian SSR	FC Shirak Leninakan
1	Estonian SSR	FC Dinamo Tallinn

=== Second subgroup ===
Pos	Rep	Team	Pld	W	D	L	GF	GA	GD	Pts
1	UKR	Zarya Lugansk	34	16	12	6	33	15	+18	44
2	UKR	SKA Kiev	34	17	7	10	42	36	+6	41
3	UKR	SKA Lvov	34	15	10	9	44	29	+15	40
4	UKR	Lokomotiv Vinnitsa	34	13	13	8	34	30	+4	39
5	RUS	Dinamo Leningrad	34	15	8	11	40	32	+8	38
6	RUS	Trud Voronezh	34	13	11	10	31	31	0	37
7	UKR	Metallurg Zaporozhye	34	12	12	10	35	28	+7	36
8	UKR	Dnepr Dnepropetrovsk	34	11	12	11	33	27	+6	34
9	RUS	Sokol Saratov	34	11	11	12	25	30	−5	33
10	UKR	Avangard Kharkov	34	6	20	8	22	23	−1	32
11	RUS	Volga Kalinin	34	11	10	13	32	46	−14	32
12	UKR	Tavria Simferopol	34	10	11	13	29	33	−4	31
13	MDA	Avyntul Kishinev (Note: Avyntul Kishinev was called Moldova.)	34	8	15	11	23	29	−6	31
14	UKR	Karpaty Lvov	34	8	14	12	23	23	0	30
15	UKR	Sudostroitel Nikolayev	34	8	14	12	27	31	−4	30
16	RUS	Shinnik Yaroslavl	34	7	16	11	36	42	−6	30
17	RUS	Volga Gorkiy	34	7	15	12	21	26	−5	29
18	UKR	Zvezda Kirovograd	34	5	15	14	18	37	−19	25

==== Top scorers ====
13 goals

- Volodymyr Dudarenko (SKA Lvov)

12 goals

- János Gabovda (Lokomotiv Vinnitsa)

11 goals

- Vladimir Voinov (Dinamo Leningrad)

==== Number of teams by republics ====
Number	Union republics	Team(s)
11	Ukrainian SSR	FC Zaria Lugansk, SKA Kiev, SKA Lvov, FC Lokomotiv Vinnitsa, FC Metallurg Zaporozhye, FC Dnepr Dnepropetrovsk, FC Avangard Kharkov, SC Tavria Simferopol, FC Karpaty Lvov, FC Sudostroitel Nikolayev, FC Zirka Kirovograd
6	Russian SFSR	FC Dinamo Leningrad, FC Trud Voronezh, FC Sokol Saratov, FC Volga Kalinin, FC Shinnik Yaroslavl, FC Volga Gorkiy
1	Moldavian SSR	FC Avyntul Kishinev

=== Third subgroup ===
Pos	Rep	Team	Pld	W	D	L	GF	GA	GD	Pts
1	UZB	Politotdel Tashkent Region	34	17	9	8	36	26	+10	43
2	KAZ	Shakhtyor Karaganda	34	18	6	10	43	26	+17	42
3	RUS	Stroitel Ufa	34	13	16	5	40	31	+9	42
4	KGZ	Alga Frunze	34	12	14	8	50	32	+18	38
5	RUS	Luch Vladivostok	34	16	6	12	40	27	+13	38
6	RUS	UralMash Sverdlovsk	34	14	10	10	44	33	+11	38
7	RUS	Lokomotiv Chelyabinsk	34	12	11	11	35	26	+9	35
8	TKM	Stroitel Ashkhabad	34	14	7	13	41	40	+1	35
9	TJK	Energetik Dushanbe	34	10	14	10	39	42	−3	34
10	RUS	Temp Barnaul	34	12	9	13	37	33	+4	33
11	RUS	Kuzbass Kemerovo (Note: Kuzbass Kemerovo was called Khimik.)	34	11	11	12	27	32	−5	33
12	RUS	SKA Khabarovsk	34	11	11	12	28	34	−6	33
13	RUS	SKA Novosibirsk	34	11	9	14	23	33	−10	31
14	RUS	Torpedo Tomsk	34	11	8	15	27	35	−8	30
15	RUS	Irtysh Omsk	34	9	10	15	26	38	−12	28
16	RUS	Zvezda Perm	34	7	13	14	25	37	−12	27
17	KAZ	Vostok Ust-Kamenogorsk	34	11	5	18	35	50	−15	27
18	UZB	Neftyanik Fergana	34	7	11	16	22	43	−21	25

==== Top scorers ====
16 goals

- Viktor Abgoltz (Shakhter Karaganda)

14 goals

- Bohdan Keslo (Politotdel Tashkent Oblast)

13 goals

- Yusup Musayev (Alga Frunze)
- Boris Brykin (Temp Barnaul)

==== Number of teams by republics ====
Number	Union republics	Team(s)
11	Russian SFSR	FC Stroitel Ufa, FC Luch Vladivostok, FC UralMash Sverdlovsk, FC Lokomotiv Chelyabinsk, FC Temp Barnaul, FC Kuzbass Kemerevo, SKA Khabarovsk, SKA Novosibirsk, FC Torpedo Tomsk, FC Irtysh Omsk, FC Zvezda Perm
2	Uzbek SSR	FC Politotdel Tashkent Oblast, FC Neftyanik Fergana
2	Kazakh SSR	FC Vostok Ust-Kamenogorsk, FC Shakhter Karaganda
1	Kyrgyz SSR	FC Alga Frunze
1	Turkmen SSR	FC Stroitel Ashkhabat
1	Tajik SSR	FC Energetik Dushanbe

== Final stage ==
=== For places 1-3 ===
[Oct 25 – Nov 16]

Pos	Rep	Team	Pld	W	D	L	GF	GA	GD	Pts	Promotion
1	UKR	Zarya Lugansk	4	2	2	0	4	1	+3	6	Promoted
2	LTU	Žalgiris Vilnius	4	2	1	1	2	2	0	5	
3	UZB	Politotdel Tashkent Region	4	0	1	3	1	4	−3	1	

=== For places 4-6 ===
[Oct 29 – Nov 14]

Pos	Rep	Team	Pld	W	D	L	GF	GA	GD	Pts
4	KAZ	Shakhtyor Karaganda	4	1	3	0	3	2	+1	5
5	RUS	Textilshchik Ivanovo	4	1	2	1	1	4	−3	4
6	UKR	SKA Kiev	4	1	1	2	6	4	+2	3

Source: rsssf.com

== See also ==
- Soviet First League
