= Vitaliy Balytskyi =

Ukrainian footballer and manager (1978–2018)

Personal information
- Full name: Vitaliy Viktorovych Balytskyi
- Date of birth: 22 August 1978
- Place of birth: Khmelnytskyi, Ukrainian SSR, Soviet Union
- Date of death: 23 July 2018 (aged 39)
- Place of death: Khmelnytskyi, Ukraine
- Height: 1.82 m (6 ft 0 in)
- Positions: Defender; midfielder

Senior career*
Years	Team	Apps	(Gls)
1995–1996	Temp-Advis-2 Shepetivka	4	(0)
1996	CSKA-2 Kyiv	4	(0)
1996–1997	Podillya Khmelnytskyi	22	(1)
1997–2002	CSKA Kyiv	90	(2)
1997–2001	→ CSKA-2 Kyiv (loans)	60	(0)
2002	Alania Vladikavkaz	10	(0)
2003	Volyn Lutsk	6	(0)
2004	Zirka Kirovohrad	7	(0)
2004	Nyva Vinnytsia	12	(1)
2005	CFR Cluj	2	(0)
2005–2006	Nafkom Brovary	10	(0)
2006–2007	Knyazha Shchaslyve	16	(0)
2007	Antares Obukhiv		
2007–2008	Podillya Khmelnytskyi	10	(1)
2009	→ Komunalnyk Luhansk (loan)	8	(0)
2009–2010	Dynamo Khmelnytskyi	36	(1)
Total		297	(6)

International career
1998–1999	Ukraine U21	12	(1)

Managerial career
- 2011–2015: Podillya Khmelnytskyi (youth school)
- 2016: Podillya Khmelnytskyi (interim)
- 2016–2018: Podillya Khmelnytskyi (assistant)
- * Club domestic league appearances and goals

Vitaliy Balytskyi (Ukrainian: Віталій Вікторович Балицький; 22 August 1978 – 23 July 2018) was a Ukrainian football player and manager.
