= Taras Horilyi =

Ukrainian footballer (born 2001)

Personal information
- Full name: Taras Volodymyrovych Horilyi
- Date of birth: 28 April 2001 (age 25)
- Place of birth: Dnipropetrovsk, Ukraine
- Height: 1.91 m (6 ft 3 in)
- Position: Centre-back

Youth career
- 2015–2018: Dnipro

Senior career*
Years	Team	Apps	(Gls)
2017–2019	Dnipro	9	(0)
2019	Khlibozavod Nº9 Dnipro	2	(0)
2019–2022	Dnipro-1	0	(0)
2021–2022	→ Nikopol (loan)	15	(1)
2022–2023	Epitsentr Kamianets-Podilskyi	3	(0)
- * Club domestic league appearances and goals as of 19 July 2023

Taras Volodymyrovych Horilyi (Ukrainian: Тарас Володимирович Горілий; born 28 April 2001) is a Ukrainian professional footballer who plays as a centre-back.

== Career ==
In summer 2022 he moved to Epitsentr Dunaivtsi. In February 2023 his contract with the club expired.

== Personal life ==
His father Volodymyr Horilyi is also a former footballer, who played for Tavriya Simferopol, Dynamo Kyiv, Zenit Saint Petersburg, Dnipro Dnipropetrovsk, and Ukraine national football team, and currently is a football manager.
