= Yuriy Solovyenko =

Ukrainian footballer and coach

Personal information
- Full name: Yuriy Leonidovych Solovyenko
- Date of birth: 20 January 1971 (age 55)
- Place of birth: Kyiv, Ukrainian SSR, Soviet Union
- Height: 1.79 m (5 ft 10 in)
- Position: Defender

Youth career
- RVUFK Kyiv

Senior career*
Years	Team	Apps	(Gls)
1989–1997	Nyva Vinnytsia	220	(4)
1997–1999	Metalurh Donetsk	50	(0)
1997–1998	→ Metalurh-2 Donetsk (loan)	6	(0)
1999–2000	Hapoel Jerusalem	15	(0)
2000	Vinnytsia	19	(0)
2001	Metalurh Mariupol	1	(0)
2001	→ Metalurh-2 Mariupol (loan)	18	(0)
Total		329	(4)

Managerial career
- 2002: Nyva Vinnytsia (assistant)
- 2006: Nyva Vinnytsia
- 2009: Nyva Vinnytsia
- 2010–2015: Tiraspol (assistant)
- 2015–2016: Nyva Vinnytsia (assistant)
- 2016–2017: Nyva Vinnytsia
- 2017–2018: Nyva Vinnytsia (assistant)
- * Club domestic league appearances and goals

Yuriy Leonidovych Solovyenko (Ukrainian: Юрій Леонідович Солов'єнко; born 20 January 1971) is a Ukrainian professional football coach and a former defender.

He was a head coach in FC Nyva Vinnytsia and assistant coach to Iurie Blonari and Vlad Goian in FC Tiraspol. In Nyva Vinnytsia Solovyenko often worked along with Volodymyr Reva.
