= FC Nyva Vinnytsia =

Nyva Vinnytsia
- Full name: FC Nyva Vinnytsia
- Founded: 1958
- Ground: Central City Stadium, Vinnytsia
- Capacity: 24,000
- Chairman: Artur Zahorulko
- Head coach: Yuriy Yaroshenko
- League: Ukrainian Second League
- 2024–25: Ukrainian Second League, 9th (Group B)
- Website: niva-v.com.ua
Home colours	Away colours

FC Nyva Vinnytsia is a Ukrainian professional football club based in the city of Vinnytsia. The name "Nyva" translates to "grain field". The club was created in 1958 in the Soviet Union and folded in 2005 and 2012, but was reformed again in 2015 as Nyva-V and renamed back to Nyva in 2018. Since 2021, the club has been owned by one of their players.

== History ==
=== Previous clubs ===
A football team in Vinnytsia existed before World War II as a local team of Vinnytsia city, which participated in championships among other cities. After the 1936 reorganization of football competition, the team continued to play in lower tiers.

Following World War II, in 1946 football in Vinnytsia was represented by the Spartak society. In 1947, the team played under Dynamo's colors, which for the next several years regularly won regional competitions and made final appearances.

The team's names include "Trud", "Burevisnyk", and City Team.

=== Lokomotyv → Nyva ===
In 1958, the current club was established as a Soviet team of the local locomotive factory as Lokomotyv Vinnytsia, which was established on the initiative of the director of Southwestern Railway Petro Kryvonos.

After Ukraine gained independence from the Soviet Union in 1991, Nyva was selected to play in the inaugural Ukrainian Premier League in 1992, due to being one of the top 9 (of 11) Ukrainian teams from the West Division of the Soviet Second League in 1991.

After being relegated in 1992, Nyva spent the 1993 season in the Ukrainian second division in the First League. Nyva was quickly promoted back to the top level next season after winning the competition.

Nyva Vinnytsia's best achievement in the Ukrainian Premier League was a 10th-place finish in the 1993–94 season. The club also surprisingly made the 1995–96 Ukrainian Cup finals, only to lose to Dynamo Kyiv. As a result, Nyva took part in the 1996–97 UEFA Cup Winners' Cup, even progressing to the first round after beating JK Tallinna Sadam on away goals (1:2 loss in Tallinn and 1:0 win in Vinnytsia). However, the Swiss side FC Sion beat the Ukrainian side with a 6:0 score on aggregate (2:0 in Sion and 4:0 in Vinnytsia), ending the dream run in Europe.

The club ceased to exist after it was relegated from the First League in 2006 because of financial difficulties. In 2006 it was replaced with FC Bershad from Bershad, Vinnytsia oblast (see FC Nyva Bershad).

=== Nyva-Svitanok ===
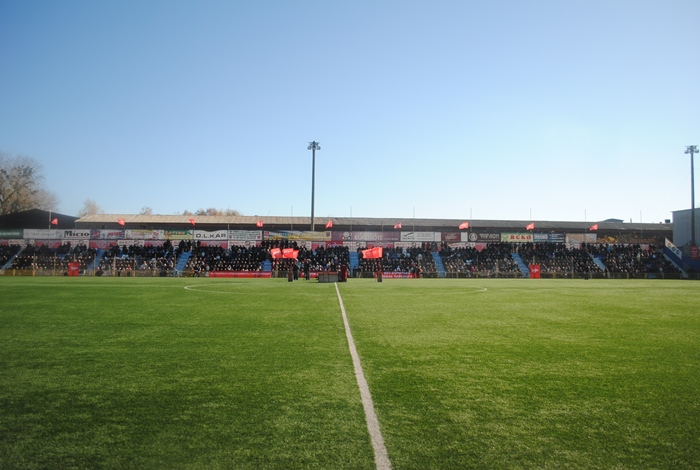
Sports Complex Nyva

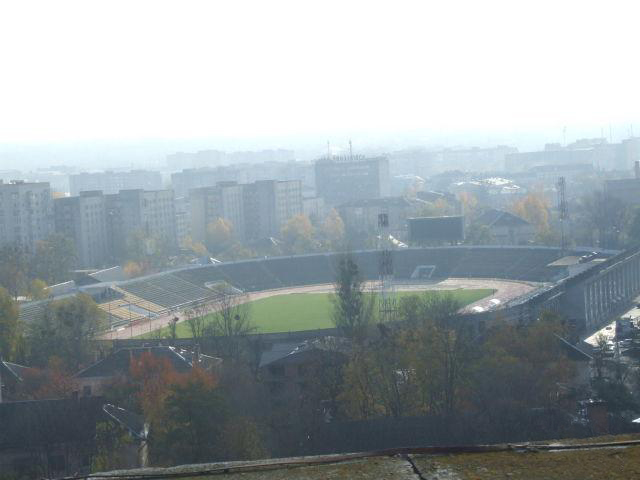
Central City Stadium

In the 2007–08 season, the club reentered professional league competition into the Second League as FC Nyva-Svitanok, the new part of its name meaning dawn, or new beginning. Also, Svitanok is the name of a city's flower market.

On 8 July 2008, the club changed their name from "FC Nyva-Svitanok Vinnytsia" to "PFC Nyva Vinnytsia".

=== Establishment of PFC Nyva-V ===
The club was again reformed and entered the Vinnytsia Oblast competition for 2015–16, finishing in fifth place. On 29 February 2016, there took place a conference, at which it was announced about the revival of the professional football club. It was expected that FC Vinnytsia would merge into the new PFC Nyva-V. The new owner became Vasyl Vovk. It was announced that the club is going through a licensing process to play in the Ukrainian Second League. In 2016, the club participated in the 2016 Ukrainian Football Amateur League, finishing second in their group. The club successfully passed attestation and competed in the 2016–17 Ukrainian Second League season finishing 7th place.

At the end of 2020, the club announced about financial hardship, and acting president of the club Vadym Kudiarov complained about lack of interest from local government and public.

== Infrastructure ==
=== Stadiums ===
The club had adopted a stadium that previously belonged to the Vinnytsia chemical factory. It became known as the Sports Complex Nyva, which has a capacity of 3,282 seats.

Also, the club plays some of their games at the Tsentralnyi Stadion (Central Stadium, previously Lokomotyv), which was expanded before the 1980 Summer Olympics and has a capacity of 24,000 spectators. The Central Stadium is usually used in "big" matches against famous opponents, while all the other matches are played at SC Nyva.

In addition, the club owns a small training base in Vinnytsia.

=== Reserves and the academy ===
In 1999, Nyva fielded its second squad in the Second League as Nyva Vinnytsia, while the first squad competed as FC Vinnytsia in the First League.

== Presidents ==
- 2016–2019 Vasyl Vovk
- 2019–? Dmytro Rohozyuk
- ?–? Vadym Kudiyarov
- 2021–present Artur Zahorulko

== Honors ==
- Ukrainian Cup
  - Runners-up (1): 1995–96
- Ukrainian First League
  - Winners (1): 1992–93
- Championship of the Ukrainian SSR
  - Winners (2): 1964, 1984
  - Runners-up (3): 1963, 1981, 1985
- Ukrainian Second League
  - Runners-up (1): 2009–10 (Group A)
- Ukrainian League Cup (among amateurs and lower leagues' clubs)
  - Winners (1): 2009–10

== Current squad ==
As of 20 March 2026

Note: Flags indicate national team as defined under FIFA eligibility rules; some limited exceptions apply. Players may hold more than one non-FIFA nationality.

No.	Pos.	Nation	Player
1	GK	UKR	Denys Zaychenko
3	DF	UKR	Kyryl Kudyna
5	MF	UKR	Yevgen Mezhenskyi
7	MF	UKR	Nikita Petruk (on loan from UCSA Tarasivka)
8	MF	UKR	Ivan Ryabyi
9	FW	UKR	Artem Petryk
10	DF	UKR	Artur Zahorulko
11	MF	UKR	Artur Petlenko
13	MF	UKR	Anton Vlasenko
16	MF	UKR	Mykyta Kostyukov
17	DF	UKR	Kostyantyn Kolchin
19	DF	UKR	Yevgeniy Moroz
21	FW	UKR	Vitaliy Hemeha

No.	Pos.	Nation	Player
22	MF	UKR	Yaroslav Yakymchuk
23	DF	UKR	Oleksandr Boryachuk
25	GK	UKR	Roman Zakharchuk
29	MF	UKR	Vladyslav Kondratyuk
33	DF	UKR	Maksym Vasin (on loan from UCSA Tarasivka)
35	GK	UKR	Dmytro Koshlyak
41	MF	BRA	Icaro Mendes (on loan from UCSA Tarasivka)
44	MF	UKR	Nazar Chuprynda
70	MF	UKR	Oleksandr Balokin
77	MF	UKR	Yaroslav Poberezhets
88	FW	UKR	Vladyslav Pogorilyi
99	FW	UKR	Dmytro Chygur
—	FW	UKR	Artem Yurchenko

== European record ==
Its first and the only European competition participation occurred in 1996–97 season in UEFA Cup Winners' Cup.

Season	Competition	Round	Opponent	Home	Away	Aggregate
1996–97	UEFA Cup Winners' Cup	Q	(Estonia) JK Tallinna Sadam	1–0	1–2	2–2 (a)
1996–97	UEFA Cup Winners' Cup	1R	(Switzerland) FC Sion	0–4	0–2	0–6

Notes

- 1R: First round
- Q: Qualifying round

== League and Cup history ==
=== Soviet Union / Ukrainian SSR (Dynamo) ===
Season	Div.	Pos.	Pl.	W	D	L	GS	GA	P	All-Union Cup	Republican Cup	Notes
In 1938 Dynamo Vinnytsia took part in the Soviet Cup.
World War II
Dynamo Vinnytsia
1947	3rd "2" (Republican)	1	3	2	1	0	8	4	5			first stage
1947	3rd "2" (Republican)	5	5	1	1	3	5	17	3			final group
1948	3rd "8" (Republican)	1										first stage
1948	3rd "8" (Republican)	3										semifinal groups
1949	3rd "8" (Republican)	1										first stage
1949	3rd "8" (Republican)	4	3	0	0	3	4	11	0			semifinal groups
1950	3rd "1" (Republican)	6	18	6	6	6	33	26	18			
1951	3rd "1" (Republican)	2	18	11	5	2	33	17	27			
1952	3rd "1" (Republican)	7	22	6	6	10	27	41	18			

=== Soviet Union / Ukrainian SSR (Lokomotyv / Nyva) ===
Season	Div.	Pos.	Pl.	W	D	L	GS	GA	P	All-Union Cup	Republican Cup	Notes
Lokomotyv Vinnytsia
1958	2nd "3" (Klass B)	3	30	14	7	9	42	37	35	Zonal Group		
1959	2nd "4" (Klass B)	1	28	17	7	4	59	30	41	Round of 32		
1960	2nd "1" (Klass B, UkrSSR)	2	32	18	8	6	51	25	44	Round of 32		
1961	2nd "1" (Klass B, UkrSSR)	2	34	21	8	5	56	27	50	Round of 64		Qualified to the 3rd place playoff
1961	2nd "1" (Klass B, UkrSSR)	3	2	1	1	0	2	0	3	Round of 64		
1962	2nd "3" (Klass B, UkrSSR)	3	24	13	4	7	40	25	30			Qualified to the competition for places 7–17
1962	2nd "3" (Klass B, UkrSSR)	16	10	2	2	6	10	13	6			Relegation playoffs won, (Note: Burevisnyk Vinnytsia 4:0, 0:0) Relegated (Note: league pyramid re-organization)
1963	3rd "1" (Klass B, UkrSSR)	1	38	25	10	3	58	22	60			Qualified to the 1st place playoff
1963	3rd "1" (Klass B, UkrSSR)	2	2	0	0	2	0	3	0			No promotion
1964	3rd "2" (Klass B, UkrSSR)	2	30	16	9	5	40	17	41			Qualified to the top six competition
1964	3rd "2" (Klass B, UkrSSR)	1	10	7	3	0	14	3	17			Promoted
1965	2nd (Klass A, Vtoraya Gruppa)	21	46	13	20	13	41	37	46			
1966	2nd "2" (Klass A, Vtoraya Gruppa)	4	34	13	13	8	34	30	39			
1967	2nd "2" (Klass A, Vtoraya Gruppa)	10	38	12	16	10	45	44	40			
1968	2nd "1" (Klass A, Vtoraya Gruppa)	10	40	14	13	13	46	33	41			
1969	2nd "3" (Klass A, Vtoraya Gruppa)	20	42	8	18	16	37	49	34			Relegated two tiers, due to reforms
1970	4th (Klass B)	2	40	22	15	3	60	17	59			Promoted
1971	3rd "1" (Vtoraya Liga)	7	50	17	22	11	47	35	56			
1972	3rd "1" (Vtoraya Liga)	7	46	19	16	11	49	36	54			
1973	3rd "1" (Vtoraya Liga)	5	44	18	11 (Note: all draws that were won on penalty kicks for which gained a point)	15 (Note: including 5 draws lost on penalty kicks for which gained 0 points)	64	33	47			
1974	3rd "6" (Vtoraya Liga)	7	38	14	14	10	48	33	42			
1975	3rd "6" (Vtoraya Liga)	8	32	11	11	10	41	36	33			
1976	3rd "6" (Vtoraya Liga)	12	38	12	11	15	38	47	35			
1977	3rd "2" (Vtoraya Liga)	15	44	14	8	22	47	70	36			
1978	3rd "2" (Vtoraya Liga)	12	44	14	16	14	30	31	44			
Nyva Vinnytsia
1979	3rd "2" (Vtoraya Liga)	21	46	11	13	22	36	44	35			
1980	3rd "5" (Vtoraya Liga)	13	44	17	8	19	50	46	42			
1981	3rd "5" (Vtoraya Liga)	2	44	23	11	10	60	34	57			
1982	3rd "6" (Vtoraya Liga)	5	46	23	13	10	69	36	59			
1983	3rd "6" (Vtoraya Liga)	3	50	29	11	10	86	44	69			
1984	3rd "6" (Vtoraya Liga)	1	36	21	10	5	58	18	52			Qualified to the promotion tournament (Note: There were 3 groups of three teams in each with only group winners obtaining promotion.)
1984	3rd "A" (Promotion tournament)	2	4	1	1	2	3	3	3			No promotion
1985	3rd "6" (Vtoraya Liga)	2	40	22	15	3	102	46	59			
1986	3rd "6" (Vtoraya Liga)	7	40	17	9	14	44	44	43			
1987	3rd "6" (Vtoraya Liga)	13	52	20	13	19	54	47	53			
1988	3rd "6" (Vtoraya Liga)	19	50	15	14	21	47	59	44			
1989	3rd "6" (Vtoraya Liga)	5	52	25	15	12	75	40	65			Qualified to the reformed Vtoraya Liga
1990	3rd "West" (Vtoraya Liga)	5	42	17	16	9	56	29	50			
1991	3rd "West" (Vtoraya Liga)	5	42	21	7	14	54	40	49			Admitted to Vyshcha Liha

=== Ukraine ===
Season	Div.	Pos.	Pl.	W	D	L	GS	GA	P	Domestic Cup	Europe		Notes
Nyva Vinnytsia
1992	1st "A" (Vyshcha Liha)	8	18	5	4	9	18	33	14	1/32 finals			Relegated
1992–93	2nd (Persha Liha)	1	42	24	14	4	73	26	62	1/16 finals			Promoted
1993–94	1st (Vyshcha Liha)	10	34	7	6	21	25	51	20	1/8 finals			
1994–95	1st (Vyshcha Liha)	14	34	10	7	17	38	51	37	1/4 finals			
1995–96	1st (Vyshcha Liha)	15	34	11	7	16	28	36	40	Runners-up			
1996–97	1st (Vyshcha Liha)	16	30	4	6	20	19	48	18	1/4 finals	CWC	1st round	Relegated
1997–98	2nd (Persha Liha)	5	42	22	7	13	58	34	73	1/8 finals			
1998–99	2nd (Persha Liha)	6	38	16	9	13	45	39	57	1/64 finals			
FC Vinnytsia
1999–00	2nd (Persha Liha)	11	34	14	6	14	29	39	48	1/8 finals			
2000–01	2nd (Persha Liha)	10	34	12	8	14	35	41	44	1/16 finals			
2001–02	2nd (Persha Liha)	15	34	10	8	16	35	52	38	1/16 finals			
2002–03	2nd (Persha Liha)	16	34	9	9	16	18	31	36	1/32 finals			
Nyva Vinnytsia
2003–04	2nd (Persha Liha)	8	34	14	10	10	34	24	52	1/16 finals			
2004–05	2nd (Persha Liha)	5	34	15	8	11	49	38	53	1/4 finals			Bankrupt
2005–06	Club Idle												
Nyva-Svitanok Vinnytsia
2006	4th (Amatory)	2	6	2	3	1	7	3	9				Stage 1
2006	4th (Amatory)	2	6	3	2	1	14	5	11				Stage 2
2006	4th (Amatory)	4	3	0	0	3	0	2	0				Stage 3
2007–08	3rd "A" (Druha Liha)	9	30	10	5	15	23	40	35	Did not enter			
Nyva Vinnytsia
2008–09	3rd "A" (Druha Liha)	3	32	18	7	7	40	29	61	1/16 finals			
2009–10	3rd "A" (Druha Liha)	2	20	12	4	4	43	16	40	1/32 finals			Promoted (Note: Won playoff game 0–2 over FC Kremin Kremenchuk after Desna Chernihiv failed attestation for the next season and withdrew)
2010–11	2nd (Persha Liha)	10	34	14	8	12	44	42	50	1/32 finals			
2011–12	2nd (Persha Liha)	13	34	7	11	16	21	39	32	1/32 finals (Note: The club informed the PFL that the club was having financial difficulties and would not arrive for the scheduled cup game against Tytan Armyansk.)			Relegated (Note: The club informed the PFL that they were to withdraw from the league prior to the start of the 2012–13 season due to insufficient funds. However, the city and the oblast administration informed the PFL guaranteeing sufficient funds for the next season. The Administration of the PFL presided at a special meeting and accepted the license. The club was relegated to the Ukrainian Second League for the next season. (10 July 2012))
2012–15	Club Idle												
2015–16	Club reforms and participates in oblast competition												
Nyva-V Vinnytsia
2016	4th (Amatory)	2	6	2	2	2	5	5	8				
2016–17	3rd (Druha Liha)	7	32	14	8	10	42	33	50	1/16 finals	-	-	-
2017–18	3rd "A" (Druha Liha)	3	27	13	6	8	34	21	45	1/32 finals	-	-	-
Nyva Vinnytsia
2018–19	3rd "A" (Druha Liha)	4	27	11	9	7	29	23	42	1/16 finals	-	-	-
2019–20	3rd "A" (Druha Liha)	9_{/11}	20	5	5	10	22	28	20	1/32 finals	-	-	-
2020–21	3rd "A" (Druha Liha)	6_{/13}	24	10	3	11	38	38	33	1/8 finals	-	-	-
2021–22	3rd "A" (Druha Liha)	8_{/15}	17	7	4	6	29	20	25	1/32 finals	-	-	-
2022–23	3rd (Druha Liha)	4_{/10}	18	10	5	3	29	16	35	None	-	-	-
2023–24	3rd (Druha Liha)	8_{/14}	26	9	9	8	36	35	36	1/64 finals	-	-	-
2024–25	3rd "B" (Druha Liha)	9_{/10}	18	5	1	12	14	26	16	1/64 finals	-	-	-
2025–26	3rd "A" (Druha Liha)	3_{/11}	30	15	6	9	42	32	51	1/8 finals	-	-	-
2026–27	3rd "A" (Druha Liha)	4_{/9}	3	1	1	1	5	5	4	1/16 finals	-	-	TBD

== Managers ==
- (Ukraine) Vyacheslav Hroznyi – 1990–92
- (Ukraine) Valeriy Petrov – 1992
- (Ukraine) Serhiy Morozov – 1995–96
- (Ukraine) Oleksandr Ishchenko – 1997–98
- (Ukraine) Volodymyr Atamanyuk (caretaker) – 1998
- (Ukraine) Volodymyr Bezsonov – 2004–05
- (Ukraine) Yuriy Solovyenko – 2006
- (Ukraine) Ivan Panchyshyn (July 2007 – April 2008)
- (Ukraine) Yuriy Solovyenko – 2008
- (Ukraine) Bohdan Blavatskyi – 2009
- (Ukraine) Oleh Fedorchuk – 2009–11
- (Ukraine) Oleh Ostapenko (caretaker) – 2011
- (Ukraine) Oleh Shumovytskyi (caretaker) – 2012
- (Ukraine) Oleh Ostapenko (caretaker) – 2012
- (Ukraine) Volodymyr Reva – 2015–16
- (Ukraine) Yuriy Solovyenko – 2016
- (Cameroon) Colince Ngaha Poungoue (caretaker) – 2016
- (Ukraine) Yuriy Solovyenko (caretaker) – 2016–17
- (Ukraine) Volodymyr Horilyi (11 March 2017 – 18 September 2017)
- (Ukraine) Denys Kolchin – 2017–18
- (Cameroon) Colince Ngaha Poungoue – 2019
- (Ukraine) Oleh Shumovytskyi – 2019–21
- (Ukraine) Volodymyr Tsytkin – 2021
- (Ukraine) Ihor Leonov (15 January 2022 – present)
