= Oleksiy Yakymenko =

Ukrainian footballer and manager (born 1974)

Personal information
- Full name: Oleksiy Volodymyrovych Yakymenko
- Date of birth: 22 October 1974 (age 52)
- Place of birth: Odesa, Ukrainian SSR, Soviet Union
- Height: 1.79 m (5 ft 10 in)
- Position: Midfielder

Senior career*
Years	Team	Apps	(Gls)
1992–1993	Krystal Kherson	27	(0)
1993	Vorskla Poltava	19	(0)
1994	Torpedo Zaporizhzhia	12	(0)
1994	Tavriya Kherson	4	(0)
1994–1995	Torpedo Zaporizhzhia	21	(1)
1995–1997	SC Mykolaiv	60	(7)
1998	Gazovik-Gazprom Izhevsk	10	(1)
1998–1999	Levski Sofia	6	(0)
1999–2001	Kryvbas Kryvyi Rih	37	(2)
1999–2000	Kryvbas-2 Kryvyi Rih	13	(4)
2001–2002	Frunzenets-Liha-99 Sumy	30	(17)
2002–2003	Stal Alchevsk	40	(9)
2004–2005	Zorya Luhansk	51	(18)
2006–2009	Ihroservice Simferopol	107	(25)

Managerial career
- 2016–2017: Krystal Kherson
- * Club domestic league appearances and goals

Oleksiy Volodymyrovych Yakymenko (Ukrainian: Олексій Володимирович Якименко; born 22 October 1974, in Odesa, in the Ukrainian SSR of the Soviet Union) is a Ukrainian football midfielder.

== Career ==
He played for Krystal Kherson, Vorskla Poltava, Torpedo Zaporizhzhia, Tavriya Kherson, SC Mykolaiv, Gazovik-Gazprom Izhevsk, Levski Sofia, Kryvbas Kryvyi Rih, Frunzenets-Liha-99 Sumy, Stal Alchevsk, Zorya Luhansk and Ihroservice Simferopol.

== Honours ==
champion: 1990.

- Ukrainian Premier League bronze medalist: 1998/1999, 1999/2000
- Ukrainian First League bronze medalist: 2004/2005
- Bulgarian A Professional Football Group runner-up: 1998
- Ukrainian Cup finalist: 1999
