= 1967 Soviet Class A Second Group =

Soviet Class A Second Group
- Season: 1967
- Champions: FC Dinamo Kirovabad SKA Kiev FC Shakhter Karaganda
- Promoted: FC Dinamo Kirovabad

The 1967 Soviet Class A Second Group was the fifth season of the Soviet Class A Second Group football competitions that was established in 1963. It was also the 27th season of the Soviet second-tier league competition.

== First stage ==
=== First subgroup ===
Pos	Rep	Team	Pld	W	D	L	GF	GA	GD	Pts
1	AZE	Dinamo Kirovabad	38	21	10	7	49	25	+24	52
2	LVA	Daugava Riga	38	20	12	6	44	22	+22	52
3	RUS	Kuban Krasnodar	38	20	9	9	39	17	+22	49
4	RUS	Rubin Kazan	38	16	12	10	36	26	+10	44
5	RUS	Terek Grozny	38	16	12	10	32	23	+9	44
6	RUS	Dinamo Leningrad	38	16	11	11	46	29	+17	43
7	BLR	Spartak Gomel	38	11	19	8	27	24	+3	41
8	GEO	Lokomotiv Tbilisi	38	15	9	14	39	36	+3	39
9	RUS	Traktor Volgograd	38	15	9	14	35	36	−1	39
10	RUS	Dinamo Stavropol	38	14	11	13	30	39	−9	39
11	GEO	Meshakhte Tkibuli	38	12	13	13	40	39	+1	37
12	RUS	Spartak Nalchik	38	13	11	14	36	36	0	37
13	RUS	Baltika Kaliningrad	38	13	11	14	30	35	−5	37
14	RUS	Textilshchik Ivanovo	38	10	16	12	32	40	−8	36
15	LTU	Žalgiris Vilnius	38	11	11	16	30	34	−4	33
16	RUS	Spartak Orjonikidze	38	10	11	17	34	45	−11	31
17	RUS	RostSelMash Rostov-na-Donu	38	9	9	20	37	46	−9	27
18	GEO	Dinamo Batumi	38	8	11	19	32	55	−23	27
19	ARM	Shirak Leninakan	38	8	11	19	32	56	−24	27
20	EST	Dinamo Tallinn	38	8	10	20	25	42	−17	26

==== Number of teams by republics ====
Number	Union republics	Team(s)
11	Russian SFSR	FC Kuban Krasnodar, FC Rubin Kazan, FC Terek Grozny, FC Dinamo Leningrad, FC Traktor Volgograd, FC Dinamo Stavropol, FC Spartak Nalchik, FC Baltika Kaliningrad, FC Tekstilschik Ivanovo, FC Spartak Ordzhonikidze, FC Rostselmash Rostov-na-Donu
3	Georgian SSR	FC Lokomotivi Tbilisi, FC Meshakhte Tkibuli, FC Dinamo Batumi
1	Azerbaijan SSR	FC Dinamo Kirovabad
1	Latvian SSR	FC Daugava Riga
1	Belarusian SSR	FC Spartak Gomel
1	Lithuanian SSR	FK Žalgiris Vilnius
1	Armenian SSR	FC Shirak Leninakan
1	Estonian SSR	FC Dinamo Tallinn

=== Second subgroup ===
Pos	Rep	Team	Pld	W	D	L	GF	GA	GD	Pts
1	UKR	SKA Kiev	38	20	11	7	47	27	+20	51
2	UKR	Metallurg Zaporozhye	38	18	14	6	50	24	+26	50
3	UKR	SKA Lvov	38	17	14	7	42	27	+15	48
4	UKR	Dnepr Dnepropetrovsk	38	18	10	10	49	36	+13	46
5	MDA	Moldova Kishinev (Note: Moldova Kishinev was called Avyntul.)	38	15	15	8	30	19	+11	45
6	RUS	Trud Voronezh	38	16	11	11	44	31	+13	43
7	UKR	Karpaty Lvov	38	17	8	13	50	38	+12	42
8	UKR	Zvezda Kirovograd	38	17	7	14	50	40	+10	41
9	UKR	Metallist Kharkov (Note: Metallist Kharkov was called Avangard.)	38	16	8	14	35	30	+5	40
10	UKR	Lokomotiv Vinnitsa	38	12	16	10	45	44	+1	40
11	RUS	Shinnik Yaroslavl	38	13	13	12	34	35	−1	39
12	UKR	Sudostroitel Nikolayev	38	8	20	10	31	30	+1	36
13	RUS	Metallurg Tula	38	9	18	11	26	35	−9	36
14	RUS	Sokol Saratov	38	10	15	13	33	30	+3	35
15	UKR	Avangard Zholtyye Vody	38	9	15	14	22	31	−9	33
16	RUS	Volga Gorkiy	38	7	17	14	22	35	−13	31
17	UKR	Tavria Simferopol	38	10	10	18	44	57	−13	30
18	RUS	Lokomotiv Kaluga	38	9	10	19	31	54	−23	28
19	UKR	SKA Odessa	38	6	16	16	21	44	−23	28
20	RUS	Volga Kalinin	38	4	10	24	23	62	−39	18

==== Number of teams by republics ====
Number	Union republics	Team(s)
12	Ukrainian SSR	SKA Odessa, SKA Kiev, FC Metallurg Zaporozhye, SKA Lvov, FC Dnepr Dnepropetrovsk, FC Karpaty Lvov, FC Zirka Kirovograd, FC Metallist Kharkov, FC Lokomotiv Vinnitsa, FC Sudostroitel Nikolayev, FC Avangard Zheltye Vody, SC Tavria Simferopol
7	Russian SFSR	FC Trud Voronezh, FC Shinnik Yaroslavl, FC Metallurg Tula, FC Sokol Saratov, FC Volga Gorkiy, FC Lokomotiv Kaluga, FC Volga Kalinin
1	Moldavian SSR	FC Moldova Kishinev

=== Third subgroup ===
Pos	Rep	Team	Pld	W	D	L	GF	GA	GD	Pts
1	KAZ	Shakhtyor Karaganda	36	21	9	6	44	23	+21	51
2	RUS	UralMash Sverdlovsk	36	20	9	7	53	24	+29	49
3	KGZ	Alga Frunze	36	18	10	8	52	26	+26	46
4	TKM	Stroitel Ashkhabad	36	17	12	7	43	29	+14	46
5	RUS	Luch Vladivostok	36	16	12	8	38	27	+11	44
6	RUS	SKA Khabarovsk	36	15	9	12	40	37	+3	39
7	TJK	Energetik Dushanbe	36	14	9	13	43	44	−1	37
8	UZB	Politotdel Tashkent Region	36	11	14	11	36	31	+5	36
9	RUS	Temp Barnaul	36	11	13	12	35	30	+5	35
10	UZB	Neftyanik Fergana	36	10	15	11	46	41	+5	35
11	RUS	Irtysh Omsk	36	6	21	9	27	33	−6	33
12	RUS	Lokomotiv Chelyabinsk	36	9	13	14	37	33	+4	31
13	RUS	SKA Novosibirsk	36	10	11	15	33	44	−11	31
14	RUS	Torpedo Tomsk	36	8	15	13	24	44	−20	31
15	RUS	Stroitel Ufa	36	10	10	16	40	48	−8	30
16	TJK	Pamir Leninabad	36	11	8	17	40	50	−10	30
17	RUS	Zvezda Perm	36	9	11	16	20	37	−17	29
18	KAZ	Vostok Ust-Kamenogorsk	36	8	12	16	24	41	−17	28
19	RUS	Kuzbass Kemerovo	36	7	9	20	24	57	−33	23

==== Number of teams by republics ====
Number	Union republics	Team(s)
11	Russian SFSR	FC UralMash Sverdlovsk, FC Luch Vladivostok, SKA Khabarovsk, FC Temp Barnaul, FC Irtysh Omsk, FC Lokomotiv Chelyabinsk, SKA Novosibirsk, FC Torpedo Tomsk, FC Stroitel Ufa, FC Zvezda Perm, FC Kuzbass Kemerevo
2	Kazakh SSR	FC Shakhter Karaganda, FC Vostok Ust-Kamenogorsk
2	Tajik SSR	FC Energetik Dushanbe, FC Pamir Leninabad
2	Uzbek SSR	FC Politotdel Tashkent Oblast, FC Neftyanik Fergana
1	Kyrgyz SSR	FC Alga Frunze
1	Turkmen SSR	FC Stroitel Ashkhabat

== Final stage ==
=== For places 1-3 ===
[Oct 27 – Nov 16]

Pos	Rep	Team	Pld	W	D	L	GF	GA	GD	Pts
1	AZE	Dinamo Kirovabad	4	2	1	1	4	3	+1	5
1	KAZ	Shakhtyor Karaganda	4	2	1	1	4	2	+2	5
3	UKR	SKA Kiev	4	0	2	2	3	6	−3	2

==== Additional Final ====
[Nov 21, Tashkent]

- Dinamo Kirovabad 1-0 Shakhtyor Karaganda
- Dinamo Kirovabad promoted.

=== For places 4-6 ===
[Oct 27 – Nov 16]

Pos	Rep	Team	Pld	W	D	L	GF	GA	GD	Pts
4	UKR	Metallurg Zaporozhye	4	1	3	0	3	2	+1	5
5	RUS	UralMash Sverdlovsk	4	1	2	1	1	4	−3	4
6	LVA	Daugava Riga	4	1	1	2	6	4	+2	3

Source: rsssf.com

== See also ==
- Soviet First League
