= Volodymyr Reva =

Ukrainian footballer and coach

Personal information
- Full name: Volodymyr Serhiyovych Reva
- Date of birth: 25 September 1958 (age 68)
- Place of birth: Zhmerynka, Ukrainian SSR, Soviet Union
- Height: 1.79 m (5 ft 10 1/2 in)
- Position: Defender

Team information
- Current team: FC Minsk (women) (manager)

Senior career*
Years	Team	Apps	(Gls)
- Frunzenets Sumy
- Dnipro Cherkasy

Managerial career
- 1997: Nyva Vinnytsia (caretaker)
- 1997: Nyva Vinnytsia (assistant)
- 2000: FC Vinnytsia
- 2001: FC Vinnytsia
- 2001: Kovel-Volyn-2
- 2002–2003: FC Vinnytsia
- 2006–2008: Tiraspol
- 2009: Dynamo Khmelnytskyi
- 2011–2013: Skala Stryi
- 2015–2016: Nyva Vinnytsia
- 2015: Ukraine U-15 (women)
- 2015–2018: Ukraine (women)
- 2019–: FC Minsk (women)
- * Club domestic league appearances and goals

Volodymyr Serhiyovych Reva (Ukrainian: Володимир Сергійович Рева; born 25 September 1958) is a professional Ukrainian football coach and a former defender.

During 2015–2018 he served as a head coach of the Ukraine women's national football team.
