= Oleksandr Muzychuk =

Ukrainian footballer

Personal information
- Full name: Oleksandr Ihorovych Muzychuk
- Date of birth: 1 October 1994 (age 32)
- Place of birth: Truskavets, Ukraine
- Position: Midfielder

Senior career*
Years	Team	Apps	(Gls)
2011–2013	Nistru Otaci	35	(1)
2013	Zbruch Volochysk	12	(0)
2013–2014	Costuleni	31	(1)
2016	Podillya Khmelnytskyi	4	(1)
2016	FC Ukraine United		
2016–2020	Podillya Khmelnytskyi	56	(13)
2017–2018	→Kolos Kovalivka (loan)	3	(0)
2019–2020	Polissya Zhytomyr	0	(0)
2020	Nyva Terebovlia		
2020–2021	SV Fortuna Trebendorf		
- * Club domestic league appearances and goals

Oleksandr Muzychuk (born January 10, 1994) is a Ukrainian former footballer who played as a midfielder.

== Club career ==
=== Early career ===
Muzychuk began his youth training as a pupil with Podillya Khmelnytskyi. In 2011, he joined the professional ranks by playing abroad in the Moldovan National Division with Nistru Otaci for two seasons. He returned to his native country in 2013 to play with Zbruch Volochysk in the Ukrainian Football Amateur League. After a season in Ukraine, he returned to the Moldovan top-tier league to play for Costuleni. Following his second stint in Moldova, he returned to his former club academy Podillya Khmelnytskyi in 2016 to compete in Ukraine's national amateur circuit.

=== Canada ===
Muzychuk spent the summer of 2016 abroad in the Canadian Soccer League with Ukraine United. In his debut season in the Canadian circuit, he helped the club secure a playoff berth by finishing second in the league's first division. He contributed a goal against the Brantford Galaxy in the opening round of the playoffs that advanced the Ukrainians to the next round. Their playoff campaign would conclude in the next round after a defeat by the Serbian White Eagles.

=== Ukraine ===
Following his Canadian stint, he returned to his former club Podillya Khmelnytskyi in the Ukrainian Second League. In his debut season in the Ukrainian third division, he played in 12 matches and recorded 3 goals. After the season's conclusion, his contract was extended for another three years. In his second year with Podillya, he was loaned to Kolos Kovalivka in the Ukrainian First League. Muzychuk returned to Podillya the following season after making a total of 4 appearances for Kolos.

After three years with Podillya in the professional ranks, he left the club to secure a deal with Polissya Zhytomyr. In 2020, he returned to the amateur level to play with Nyva Terebovlia.

=== Germany ===
Muzychuk played in the regional German level with SV Fortuna Trebendorf in 2021.
