= Volodymyr Dudarenko =

Ukrainian and Soviet football player and coach

Personal information
- Full name: Volodymyr Ivanovych Dudarenko
- Date of birth: 6 February 1946
- Place of birth: Rivne, USSR
- Date of death: 18 May 2017 (aged 71)
- Place of death: Rivne, Ukraine
- Height: 1.70 m (5 ft 7 in)
- Position: Striker

Senior career*
| Years | Team | Apps | (Gls) |
| 1964–1965 | Kolhospnyk Rivne | 48 | (14) |
| 1966 | SKA Lviv | 31 | (13) |
| 1967–1974 | CSKA Moscow | 114 | (27) |
| 1975 | SC Lutsk | | (15) |
| 1976–1977 | SKA Lviv | 63 | (8) |

International career
| 1971 | USSR | 2 | (0) |

Managerial career
- 1979: SKA Lviv
- 1982–1984: SKA Lviv (assistant)
- * Club domestic league appearances and goals

Volodymyr Ivanovych Dudarenko (Ukrainian: Володимир Іванович Дударенко; 6 February 1946 – 18 May 2017) was a Ukrainian and Soviet football player and coach.

Volodymyr Dudarenko was born in the city of Rivne, Ukrainian SSR right after World War II.

He died on 18 May 2017.

== Honours ==
Soviet Top League

Champion with CSKA Moscow: 1970.

== International career ==
Dudarenko made his debut for USSR on 19 February 1971 in a friendly against Mexico. Later the same year he played his other game with the El Salvador national football team.
