= Volodymyr Horilyi =

Ukrainian Football Player

Personal information
- Full name: Volodymyr Ivanovych Horilyi
- Date of birth: 11 October 1965 (age 61)
- Place of birth: Chernihivka, Ukrainian SSR, Soviet Union
- Height: 1.84 m (6 ft 0 in)
- Position: Defender

Senior career*
Years	Team	Apps	(Gls)
1982–1983	Tavriya Simferopol	30	(0)
1984–1989	Dynamo Kyiv	58	(1)
1990	Zenit Leningrad	6	(0)
1990–1992	Dnipro Dnipropetrovsk	39	(0)
1992–1993	Hapoel Haifa	24	(0)
1993–1996	Dnipro Dnipropetrovsk	65	(0)

International career
1983–1986	Ukrainian SSR		
1983–1984	Soviet Union U-18		
1985	Soviet Union U-20		
1985–1987	Soviet Union U-21	6	(0)
1995	Ukraine	3	(0)

Managerial career
- 1999–2002: Kryvbas-2 Kryvyi Rih (assistant)
- 2002–2004: Dnipro-2 Dnipropetrovsk
- 2004–2010: Dnipro Dnipropetrovsk (assistant)
- 2013–2014: Ukraine U20
- 2017: Nyva-V Vinnytsia
Medal record
Men's football
Representing Soviet Union
UEFA European U-18 Championships
Runner-up	1984 Soviet Union
- * Club domestic league appearances and goals

Volodymyr Ivanovych Horilyi (Ukrainian: Володимир Іванович Горілий; born 11 October 1965) is a Soviet and Ukrainian retired football defender and a football coach.

== Career ==
Horilyi played for several teams based in USSR including Tavriya Simferopol, Dynamo Kyiv, Zenit Leningrad and Dnipro Dnipropetrovsk, as well as for Israeli side Hapoel Haifa.

In 1983 and 1986 Horilyi took part in the Summer Spartakiads of the Peoples of the USSR in the team of Ukrainian SSR.

He was capped three times for Ukraine in 1995.

He managed Dnipro Dnipropetrovsk reserve team.

=== Honours ===
- Soviet Top League
  - Winners: 1986
- Soviet Cup:
  - Winners: 1987
- Football tournament at the Spartakiad of the Soviet Union people
  - Winners: 1986
- UEFA European Under-18 Championship
  - Runners-up: 1984

== Personal life ==
His son Taras Horilyi is also a professional footballer.
