= 1966 Soviet Class B =

Second League
- Season: 1966

1966 Soviet Class B was a Soviet football competition at the Soviet third tier.

== Russian Federation ==
=== Semifinal Group 1 ===
[Novorossiysk]

Pos	Team	Pld	W	D	L	GF	GA	GD	Pts
1	Cement Novorossiysk	4	2	2	0	2	0	+2	6
2	Torpedo Taganrog	4	1	1	2	2	3	−1	3
3	Traktor Vladimir	4	1	1	2	2	3	−1	3

=== Semifinal Group 2 ===
[Kaluga]

Pos	Team	Pld	W	D	L	GF	GA	GD	Pts
1	Lokomotiv Kaluga	4	3	1	0	9	2	+7	7
2	Metallurg Kuibyshev	4	2	1	1	3	1	+2	5
3	Spartak Yoshkar-Ola	4	0	0	4	2	11	−9	0

=== Semifinal Group 3 ===
[Tula]

Pos	Team	Pld	W	D	L	GF	GA	GD	Pts
1	Metallurg Tula	4	2	1	1	3	2	+1	5
2	Lokomotiv Krasnoyarsk	4	1	2	1	2	2	0	4
3	Tekmash Kostroma	4	0	3	1	0	1	−1	3

=== Semifinal Group 4 ===
[Orjonikidze]

Pos	Team	Pld	W	D	L	GF	GA	GD	Pts
1	Spartak Orjonikidze	4	2	1	1	4	2	+2	5
2	Selenga Ulan-Ude	4	1	2	1	4	4	0	4
3	Strela Sverdlovsk	4	1	1	2	3	5	−2	3

=== Final Group ===
[Nov 5–13, Orjonikidze]

Pos	Team	Pld	W	D	L	GF	GA	GD	Pts
1	Lokomotiv Kaluga	3	3	0	0	4	0	+4	6
2	Spartak Orjonikidze	3	2	0	1	5	2	+3	4
3	Metallurg Tula	3	1	0	2	4	5	−1	2
4	Cement Novorossiysk	3	0	0	3	1	7	−6	0

== Ukraine ==
=== Final playoff ===
Dinamo Khmelnitskiy          0-0 1-1 Avangard Zholtyye Vody

=== Additional Final ===
[Nov 25, Kiev] 
Avangard Zholtyye Vody       2-1  Dinamo Khmelnitskiy

=== For 3rd place ===
Desna Chernigov              0-0 0-2 Lokomotiv Kherson

== Central Asia ==
Pos	Rep	Team	Pld	W	D	L	GF	GA	GD	Pts
1	TJK	Pamir Leninabad	36	23	7	6	61	25	+36	53
2	KAZ	Metallurg Chimkent	36	19	13	4	60	30	+30	51
3	KAZ	Dinamo Tselinograd	36	19	11	6	57	26	+31	49
4	UZB	Zarafshan Navoi	36	19	8	9	75	40	+35	46
5	KAZ	Metallurg Temirtau	36	18	9	9	39	23	+16	45
6	UZB	Khimik Chirchik	36	18	8	10	51	32	+19	44
7	UZB	Sverdlovets Tashkent Region	36	17	9	10	58	38	+20	43
8	KAZ	ADK Alma-Ata	36	16	10	10	50	37	+13	42
9	UZB	Spartak Andizhan	36	16	9	11	43	32	+11	41
10	KAZ	Metallist Jambul	36	12	16	8	54	40	+14	40
11	KGZ	Shakhtyor Osh	36	13	11	12	28	37	−9	37
12	UZB	Pahtaaral Gulistan	36	12	10	14	37	49	−12	34
13	UZB	Dimitrovets Tashkent Region	36	9	11	16	32	43	−11	29
14	UZB	Spartak Samarkand	36	9	10	17	25	32	−7	28
15	TKM	Zahmet Charjou	36	7	11	18	41	71	−30	25
16	TJK	Pahtakor Kurgan-Tyube	36	7	9	20	30	63	−33	23
17	UZB	Metallurg Almalyk	36	6	10	20	29	57	−28	22
18	TJK	Vakhsh Nurek	36	6	6	24	19	73	−54	18
19	UZB	Buhoro Buhara	36	5	4	27	28	79	−51	14

== Union republics ==
[Oct 23–30, Tkibuli]

Pos	Rep	Team	Pld	W	D	L	GF	GA	GD	Pts
1	GEO	Meshakhte Tkibuli	3	1	2	0	1	0	+1	4
2	AZE	Polad Sumgait	3	1	1	1	3	2	+1	3
3	BLR	Neman Grodno	3	1	1	1	3	3	0	3
4	ARM	Lernagorts Kafan	3	0	2	1	1	3	−2	2

Source: rsssf.com
