= 2017–18 Ukrainian Cup =

Tournament details
- Country: Ukraine
- Dates: 9 July 2017 – 9 May 2018; 9 July 2017 – 26 July 2017 (preliminary rounds); 20 September 2017 – 9 May 2018 (main event)
- Teams: 52

Final positions
- Champions: Shakhtar Donetsk (12th title)
- Runners-up: Dynamo Kyiv
- Semifinalists: SC Dnipro-1; FC Mariupol
- UEFA Europa League: none (Note: both finalists qualified for the UEFA Champions League)

Tournament statistics
- Matches played: 51
- Goals scored: 147 (2.88 per match)
- Attendance: 141,451 (2,774 per match)
- Top goal scorer: 5 – Serhiy Kyslenko (FC Lviv)
- All statistics correct as of 9 May 2018.

The 2017–18 Ukrainian Cup was the 27th annual season of Ukraine's football knockout competition. The competition started on 9 July 2017 and concluded on 9 May 2018.

This season the competition's administration was passed on to the Football Federation of Ukraine that previously was conducted by both the Premier League and Professional Football League. The number of participants has increased to 52 and is the biggest in the last five years. The FFU also promised to introduce a system of bonuses for this season's competition, yet did not disclosed them.

All competition rounds consisted of a single game with a home field advantage granted to a team from lower league. Qualification for the competition is granted to all professional clubs and finalists of the Ukrainian Amateur Cup as long as those clubs were able to pass the season's attestation (licensing).

FC Shakhtar Donetsk was the defending winner for the last two seasons. The Donetsk club has reached the competition finals in the last seven years winning five of them. There were around 300 clubs over the history of competition and it is a debut season for seven of them, Dnipro-1, Ahrobiznes, Metalist 1925, Polissya, Tavriya Simferopol, Sudnobudivnyk, and Prykarpattia. Both qualified amateur clubs have already participated in the competition before. It should be mentioned that only 10 clubs participated in every season of the tournament.

== Team allocation and schedule ==
The competition included all professional first teams from the Premier League (12/12 teams of the league), First League (18/18), Second League (21/23) and two best teams from the previous year's Amateur Cup.

=== Distribution ===
First round (26 teams)	3 entrants from the First League; 21 entrants from the Second League; 2 entrants from the Amateur Cup	
Second round (28 teams)	15 entrants from the First League	13 winners from the First round
Round of 32 (20 teams)	6 entrants from the Premier League	14 winners from the Second round
Round of 16 (16 teams)	6 entrants from the Premier League	10 winners from the Round of 20

=== Rounds schedule ===
Phase	Round	Fractional	Draw date	Game date (Note: main date, when most of the games scheduled to play; an auxiliary date might be granted in case of emergencies)
Preliminary	Round 1	1/64 finals	30 June 2017	9 July 2017
Preliminary	Round 2	1/32 finals	13 July 2017	26 July 2017
Main event	Round of 32	1/16 finals	4 August 2017	20 September 2017
Main event	Round of 16	1/8 finals	27 September 2017	25 October 2017
Main event	Quarter-finals	1/4 finals	31 October 2017	29 November 2017
Main event	Semi-finals	1/2 finals	2 March 2018	18 April 2018
Main event	Final		9 May 2018	

=== Teams ===
Enter in First Round			Enter in Second Round	Enter in Round of 32	Enter in Round of 16
AAFU; 2 teams	PFL League 2; 21 teams	PFL League 1; 3 teams	PFL League 1; 15 teams	UPL; 6 teams	UPL; 6 teams
Chaika Petropavlivska Borshchahivka; SCC Demnya	Ahrobiznes Volochysk*; Arsenal-Kyivshchyna; Bukovyna Chernivtsi; FC Dnipro; SC Dnipro-1*; Enerhiya Nova Kakhovka; FC Lviv*; Metalist 1925 Kharkiv*; Metalurh Zaporizhia; Myr Hornostayivka; FC Nikopol; Nyva Ternopil*; Nyva-V Vinnytsia; Podillya Khmelnytskyi; Polissya Zhytomyr*; Prykarpattia Ivano-Frankivsk; Real Pharma Odesa; Skala Stryi; Sudnobudivnyk Mykolaiv; Tavriya Simferopol*; FC Ternopil	Balkany Zorya; Kremin Kremenchuk; Rukh Vynnyky	Arsenal Kyiv; Avanhard Kramatorsk; Cherkaskyi Dnipro; Desna Chernihiv; Helios Kharkiv; Hirnyk-Sport; Inhulets Petrove; Kolos Kovalivka; MFC Mykolaiv; Naftovyk-Ukrnafta; Obolon-Brovar Kyiv; FC Poltava; PFC Sumy; Volyn Lutsk; Zhemchuzhyna Odesa	Karpaty Lviv; FC Mariupol; Stal Kamianske; Veres Rivne; Vorskla Poltava; Zirka Kropyvnytskyi	Chornomorets Odesa; Dynamo Kyiv; FC Oleksandriya; Olimpik Donetsk; Shakhtar Donetsk; Zorya Luhansk

Notes

- With the asterisk (*) are noted the Second League teams that were recently admitted to the league from amateurs and the AAFU (amateur) team(s) that qualified in place of the Amateur Cup finalist(s).
- Due to the FIFA sanctions, FC Dnipro, that last season was representing the Premier League, was forced to start the season as a member of the Second League. At the same time to the Second League was admitted the newly created club SC Dnipro-1 that according to SC Dnipro-1 founders had no relationship to FC Dnipro although did inherit their football academy.
- Two reserve teams from the Second League did not compete: Mykolaiv-2, Inhulets-2.
- Only few days before the start of the competition, on 6 July 2017 number of clubs announced that they have various major issues in taking part of the competition, among which are FC Arsenal-Kyivshchyna Bila Tserkva, FC Metalurh Zaporizhia, FC Sudnobudivnyk Mykolaiv (the last two, because of problems with their stadiums). On the other hand, both FC Ternopil and FC Lviv confirmed that they are ready for the competition.
- FC Lviv announced that it will play its first game of Ukrainian Cup competition in Rava-Ruska. Earlier on 5 July 2017 it was announced that Metalist 1925 answered to the call of Nyva Ternopil to switch the draw arrangement and agreed to play the game in Kharkiv. Nyva was not able to find consensus to play at the Ternopil city stadium (Miskyi) as FC Ternopil was scheduled to play at the stadium that day as well. Related documents were sent up to the Football Federation of Ukraine. On 7 July 2017 the Football Federation of Ukraine approved to conduct the game between Metalurh and Polissya at Kolos Stadium in Chkalove, Nikopol Raion as well as the game between Sudnobudivnyk and Balkany that took place on 10 July 2017 at Ivan Stadium in Odesa. Also the match arrangements between Metalist 1925 and Nyva to play in Kharkiv instead of Ternopil was approved and Metalist 1925 hosted Nyva at Sonyachny Training Center.

== Bracket ==
The following is the bracket which the Ukrainian Cup resembled. Numbers in parentheses next to the match score represent the results of a penalty shoot-out.

Round of 32; 20 September 2017
Ahrobiznes Volochysk	1
Veres Rivne (a.e.t.)	2
Inhulets Petrove	0 (5)
Arsenal-Kyiv (p)	0 (6)
Tavriya Simferopol (a.e.t.)	3
Zirka Kropyvnytskyi	2
Kolos Kovalivka	1
FC Mariupol	2
Avanhard Kramatorsk	0
Vorskla Poltava	2
Prykarpattia Ivano-Frankivsk	2
Karpaty Lviv	1
Helios Kharkiv	1
Desna Chernihiv	2
SC Dnipro-1	1
Hirnyk-Sport Horishni Plavni	0
Zhemchuzhyna Odesa	1 (1)
Stal Kamianske (p)	1 (4)
SCC Demnya	1
FC Lviv	2

Round of 16; 25 October 2017
Arsenal–Kyiv	0
Veres Rivne	1
Zorya Luhansk	3
Shakhtar Donetsk (a.e.t.)	4
Tavriya Simferopol	0
FC Mariupol	5
Vorskla Poltava (a.e.t.)	2
Olimpik Donetsk	0
Prykarpattia Ivano-Frankivsk	0
Desna Chernihiv	2
FC Oleksandriya	2
Dynamo Kyiv (a.e.t.)	3
SC Dnipro-1 (p)	0 (8)
FC Chornomorets Odesa	0 (7)
FC Lviv (p)	1 (5)
Stal Kamianske	1 (3)

Quarter-finals; 29 November 2017
Shakhtar Donetsk	4
Veres Rivne	0
Vorskla Poltava	1
FC Mariupol	2
Desna Chernihiv	0
Dynamo Kyiv	2
FC Lviv	1
SC Dnipro-1 (a.e.t.)	2

Semi-finals; 18 April 2018
Shakhtar Donetsk	5
FC Mariupol	1
SC Dnipro-1	1
Dynamo Kyiv	4

Final; 9 May 2018
Dynamo Kyiv	0
Shakhtar Donetsk	2

== Competition schedule ==
Legends: AM – AAFU (amateur) competitions (IV tier), 2L – Second League (III tier), 1L – First League (II tier), PL – Premier League (I tier)

=== First Preliminary round (1/64) ===
In this round entered three representatives from the First League, 21 clubs from the Second League, two representatives from the Amateur Cup. The draw for this round that took place 30 June 2017 at the House of Football in Kyiv was announced on 27 June 2017. The round matches were played on 9 July 2017.

9 July 2017	Tavriya Simferopol (2L)	w/o (3–0)	(2L) Skala Stryi	Nova Kakhovka, Kherson Oblast
admin.		Report		Stadium: Enerhiya

9 July 2017	Chaika Kyiv-Sviatoshyn Raion (AM)	0 – 2	(1L) Rukh Vynnyky	Petropavlivska Borshchahivka, Kyiv Oblast
17:00		Report	Bilyi 9'; Duts 90'	Stadium: Kozak Arena; Attendance: 500; Referee: Dmytro Kryvushkin (Kharkiv)

9 July 2017	Podillya Khmelnytskyi (2L)	1 – 3	(2L) Nyva-V Vinnytsia	Khmelnytskyi
18:00	Makarchenko 71'	Report	Malyarenko 9'; Ovchar 14'; Andreyev 32'	Stadium: Podillia; Attendance: 6,200; Referee: Oleksandr Shandor (Lviv)

9 July 2017	FC Nikopol (2L)	1 – 0 (a.e.t.)	(2L) Myr Hornostayivka	Nikopol, Dnipropetrovsk Oblast
17:00	Shestipalov 109'	Report		Stadium: Elektrometalurh; Attendance: 1,000; Referee: Oleksiy Derevinskyi (Kyiv)

9 July 2017	SCC Demnya (AM)	2 – 1 (a.e.t.)	(2L) FC Dnipro	Demnya, Lviv Oblast
17:00	Barabash 34'; Demkiv 120'	Report	Poddubnyi 76'	Stadium: imeni Kuziva; Attendance: 1,200; Referee: Oleksandr Solovyan (Kyiv)

9 July 2017	Metalist 1925 Kharkiv (2L)	2 – 2 (a.e.t.) (3–4 p)	(2L) Nyva Ternopil	Kharkiv
17:00	Ralyuchenko 11'; Davydov 64'	Report	Ponyedyelnik 25'; Ilchyshyn 56'	Stadium: Sonyachnyi; Attendance: 2,734; Referee: Oleksandr Pavlyuk (Kyiv)
	Penalties
	Davydov (penalty scored); Nerubenko (penalty scored); Maslov (penalty scored); Skotarenko (penalty missed); Yemelyanov (penalty missed)		(penalty scored) Slonevskyi; (penalty scored) Apanchuk; (penalty scored) Huralskyi; (penalty missed) Shevchenko; (penalty scored) Muzychenko

9 July 2017	Real Pharma Odesa (2L)	1 – 3	(2L) Enerhiya Nova Kakhovka	Odesa
18:00	Polishchuk 15'	Report	Bochak 6' (pen.); Prokipchuk 43'; Kovalchuk 74'	Stadium: Ivan; Attendance: 100; Referee: Oleksandr Kalyonov (Lviv)

9 July 2017	FC Lviv (2L)	2 – 0	(1L) Kremin Kremenchuk	Rava-Ruska, Lviv Oblast
17:00	Yanchak 74'; Omelchenko 85'	Report		Stadium: Lokomotyv; Attendance: 400; Referee: Vadym Zaprutnyak (Uzhhorod)

9 July 2017	FC Ternopil (2L)	1 – 1 (a.e.t.) (3–5 p)	(2L) Ahrobiznes Volochysk	Ternopil
18:00	Vons 83'; Vons (yellow card) 52' (yellow-red card) 85'; Kurylo (yellow card) 90' (yellow-red card) 97'	Report	Temnyuk 90' (pen.); Kukharuk (yellow card) 77' (yellow-red card) 117'	Stadium: Miskyi; Attendance: 1,800; Referee: Volodymyr Novokhatniy (Kyiv)
	Penalties
	Stryieshyn (penalty scored); Kukharskyi (penalty missed); Sukhetskyi (penalty scored); Pryshnivskyi (penalty scored)		(penalty scored) Temnyuk; (penalty scored) Atlasyuk; (penalty scored) Dumanyuk; (penalty scored) Skakun; (penalty scored) Hahun

9 July 2017	Arsenal-Kyivshchyna Bila Tserkva (2L)	0 – 3	(2L) Prykarpattia Ivano-Frankivsk	Bila Tserkva, Kyiv Oblast
17:00	Hupalov 7' (o.g.); Syomka (yellow card) 40' (yellow-red card) 74'	Report	Khudobyak 43'; Boryshkevych 76' (pen.)	Stadium: Trudovi Rezervy; Attendance: 200; Referee: Yuriy Ivanov (Makiivka)

9 July 2017	Metalurh Zaporizhya (2L)	0 – 2	(2L) Polissya Zhytomyr	Chkalove, Dnipropetrovsk Oblast
14:30	Tyelyenkov (red card) 82'	Report	Halakhov 82'; Demchyk 90'	Stadium: Kolos; Attendance: 100; Referee: Oleksandr Omelchenko (Slovyansk)

9 July 2017	SC Dnipro-1 (2L)	5 – 0	(2L) Bukovyna Chernivtsi	Dnipro
17:00	Polyovyi 42'; Kozhushko 66'; Kravchenko 73'; Kohut 90+3' (pen.)	Report	Dobrovolskyi 3' (o.g.); Naiko (red card) 89'	Stadium: Dnipro Arena; Attendance: 1,920; Referee: Maksym Kozyryatskyi (Zaporizhia)

10 July 2017	Sudnobudivnyk Mykolaiv (2L)	0 – 2	(1L) Balkany Zorya	Odesa
18:00		Report	Ursulenko 45'; Parkhomenko 90' (pen.)	Stadium: Ivan; Attendance: 250; Referee: Viktor Aranovskyi (Kyiv Oblast)

Notes:

- On 5 July 2017 the club director of Skala Stryi confirmed that the club will not show up for the cup game against Tavriya as they pressed for time to gather a team. On 24 July 2017 it was announced that the FFU Control and Disciplinary Committee awarded a technical loss to Skala (0:3) and fined it for 5,000 hryvnias.

=== Second Preliminary round (1/32) ===
In this round will include 15 more representatives from the First League in addition to the two that advanced from the previous round as well as 10 clubs from the Second League and one representatives from the Amateur Cup. The draw for this round that took place on 13 July 2017 at the House of Football in Kyiv was announced on 11 July 2017. Later (21 July 2017) it was confirmed that the date for the game Tavriya – Nyva-V should be 27 July 2017.

26 July 2017	Avanhard Kramatorsk (1L)	1–0	(1L) MFC Mykolaiv	Kramatorsk, Donetsk Oblast
18:00	Daudov 43'; Demchenko (yellow card) 54' (yellow-red card) 65'	Report	Momot (yellow card) 52' (yellow-red card) 72'	Stadium: Prapor; Attendance: 1,480; Referee: Oleksiy Derevynskyi (Kyiv)

26 July 2017	Helios Kharkiv (1L)	0–0 (a.e.t.) (3–1 p)	(1L) Obolon-Brovar Kyiv	Kharkiv
17:00		Report		Stadium: Sonyachnyi; Attendance: 900; Referee: Maksym Kozyriatskyi (Zaporizhia)
	Penalties
	Semenyna (penalty missed); Lutsenko (penalty scored); Hrankin (penalty scored); Kicha (penalty scored)		Prodan (penalty scored); Yeremenko (penalty missed); Kozak (penalty missed); Kornev (penalty missed)

26 July 2017	Inhulets Petrove (1L)	3–1	(1L) FC Poltava	Petrove, Kirovohrad Oblast
18:00	Mishurenko 43'; Zhukov 63'; Kretov 84'	Report	Fomenko 52'	Stadium: Inhulets; Attendance: 850; Referee: Volodymyr Novokhatniy (Kyiv)

26 July 2017	Nyva Ternopil (2L)	0 – 2	(2L) Prykarpattia Ivano-Frankivsk	Vyshnivets, Ternopil Oblast
18:00		Report	Kuzmyn 80'; Khudobyak 87'	Stadium: Vyshnivets Sports Complex; Attendance: 1,200; Referee: Oleksandr Shandor (Lviv)

26 July 2017	Enerhiya Nova Kakhovka (2L)	1 – 4	(1L) Zhemchuzhyna Odesa	Nova Kakhovka, Kherson Oblast
17:00	Shastal 40'	Report	Lazarovych 26'; Shestakov 33'; Malysh 47'; Horbovskyi 72'	Stadium: Enerhiya; Attendance: 600; Referee: Oleksandr Afanasyev (Kharkiv)

26 July 2017	Rukh Vynnyky (1L)	1 – 3 (a.e.t.)	(1L) Hirnyk-Sport Horishni Plavni	Vynnyky, Lviv
17:00	Duts 28'; Baranets (yellow card) 3' (yellow-red card) 66'	Report	Shevchuk 45', 93'; Panasenko 118'	Stadium: imeni Markevycha; Attendance: 2,000; Referee: Oleksandr Pavlyuk (Kyiv)

26 July 2017	Desna Chernihiv (1L)	4 – 0	(1L) Balkany Zorya	Chernihiv
18:00	Chornomorets 8', 37'; Filippov 73'; Favorov 90'	Report		Stadium: imeni Gagarina; Attendance: 2,845; Referee: Oleksandr Sakhno (Kyiv)

26 July 2017	Ahrobiznes Volochysk (2L)	2 – 2 (a.e.t.) (5–4 p)	(1L) Naftovyk-Ukrnafta Okhtyrka	Volochysk, Khmelnytskyi Oblast
18:00	Atlasyuk 30'	Report	Katelin 6', 80' (o.g.); Antyukh 74'	Stadium: Yunist; Attendance: 3,000; Referee: Viktor Aranovskyi (Kyiv Oblast)
	Penalties
	Temnyuk (penalty scored); Atlasyuk (penalty scored); Dumanyuk (penalty scored); Hrusha (penalty scored); Yurchak (penalty scored)		(penalty scored) Bilyk; (penalty scored) Vlasyuk; (penalty scored) Sukhanov; (penalty scored) Katelin; (penalty missed) Tsyutsyura

26 July 2017	Kolos Kovalivka (1L)	3 – 2	(1L) Cherkaskyi Dnipro	Kovalivka, Kyiv Oblast
18:00	Maksymenko 14' (o.g.); Nekhtiy 33'; Koropetskyi 41'; Havrysh 77'	Report	Storchous 90'	Stadium: Kolos; Attendance: 200; Referee: Yuriy Ivanov (Makiivka)

26 July 2017	SCC Demnya (AM)	1 – 0	(2L) Polissya Zhytomyr	Demnya, Lviv Oblast
17:00	Pokladok 89'	Report	Zainchkovskyi (yellow card) 7' (yellow-red card) 90'	Stadium: imeni Kuziva; Attendance: 850; Referee: Dmytro Denysyuk (Fastiv)

26 July 2017	FC Nikopol (2L)	0 – 1	(1L) Arsenal Kyiv	Nikopol, Dnipropetrovsk Oblast
17:00		Report	Nasimi 59'	Stadium: Elektrometalurh; Attendance: 1,000; Referee: Yevhen Petrenko (Odesa)

26 July 2017	FC Lviv (2L)	3 – 0	(1L) Volyn Lutsk	Lviv
19:00	Kyslenko 41', 72'; Bukhal 70'	Report	Shapoval (yellow card) 34' (yellow-red card) 38'; Melinyshyn (red card) 79'; Petrov (red card) 79'	Stadium: SKIF; Attendance: 1,400; Referee: Oleksandr Solovyan (Kyiv)

26 July 2017	SC Dnipro-1 (2L)	2 – 0	(1L) PFC Sumy	Dnipro
19:00	Voitsekhovskyi 11'; Snizhko 76'	Report		Stadium: Dnipro Arena; Attendance: 1,574; Referee: Dmytro Panchyshyn (Kharkiv)

27 July 2017	Tavriya Simferopol (2L)	2 – 1 (a.e.t.)	(2L) Nyva-V Vinnytsia	Nova Kakhovka, Kherson Oblast
17:00	Zhavko 84'; Masyutkin 102'	Report	Malyarenko 60'; Ngaha (penalty missed) 74'; Duhiyenko (red card) 77'	Stadium: Enerhiya; Attendance: 300; Referee: Volodymyr Milanych (Mykolaiv)

=== Round of 32 (1/16) ===
In this round the first 6 representatives from the Premier League will enter the competition along with the 14 teams that advanced from the previous round including 8 clubs from the First League, 5 clubs from the Second League, and one representatives from the Amateur Cup. The draw for this round was held on 4 August 2017 at the House of Football in Kyiv and was announced on 1 August 2017. The round matches were played on 20 September 2017.

20 September 2017	Helios Kharkiv (1L)	1–2	(1L) Desna Chernihiv	Kharkiv
15:00	Abyelyentsev 13'	Report	Kartushov 11', 74'	Stadium: Helios Arena; Attendance: 200; Referee: Vitaliy Malyar

20 September 2017	FC Kolos Kovalivka (1L)	1–2	(PL) FC Mariupol	Kovalivka, Kyiv Oblast
16:00	Lysenko 50'	Report	Kozhanov 45'; Kisil 53'	Stadium: Kolos; Attendance: 800; Referee: Dmytro Panchyshyn

20 September 2017	Zhemchuzhyna Odesa (1L)	1–1 (a.e.t.) (1–4 p)	(PL) Stal Kamianske	Odesa
16:00	Dolynskyi 44'	Report	Mytsyk 65'	Stadium: Spartak; Attendance: 1,000; Referee: Oleksandr Pavlyuk
	Penalties
	Pospelov (penalty missed); Petko (penalty scored); Murashov (penalty missed)		Mysyk (penalty scored); Mykhailychenko (penalty scored); Obradović (penalty scored); Malakyan (penalty scored)

20 September 2017	SC Tavriya Simferopol (2L)	3–2 (a.e.t.)	(PL) Zirka Kropyvnytskyi	Beryslav, Kherson Oblast
16:00	Lohvynenko 7' (pen.); Yeloyev 15'; Voronchenko 108'	Report	Rassadkin 10'; Panfilov 18'	Stadium: Mashynobudivnyk; Attendance: 1,000; Referee: Yevhen Petrenko

20 September 2017	Ahrobiznes Volochysk (2L)	1–2 (a.e.t.)	(PL) Veres Rivne	Volochysk, Khmelnytskyi Oblast
16:00	Dumanyuk 118'	Report	Morozenko 101'; Skotarenko 111'	Stadium: Yunist; Attendance: 3,750; Referee: Yevhen Yakovlev

20 September 2017	Inhulets Petrove (1L)	0–0 (a.e.t.) (5–6 p)	(1L) Arsenal Kyiv	Petrove, Kirovohrad Oblast
17:30		Report		Stadium: Inhulets; Attendance: 500; Referee: Ihor Debenko
	Penalties
	Honcharenko (penalty scored); Ella (penalty scored); Svitlychnyi (penalty scored); Loktionov (penalty scored); Sichinava (penalty scored); Medvedyev (penalty missed)		Borovets (penalty scored); Pylypenko (penalty scored); Vechtomov (penalty scored); Chernenko (penalty scored); Starhorodskyi (penalty scored); Ivanov (penalty scored)

20 September 2017	Avanhard Kramatorsk (1L)	0–2	(PL) Vorskla Poltava	Kramatorsk, Donetsk Oblast
18:00		Report	Kadymyan 74'; Kolomoyets 89'	Stadium: Avanhard; Attendance: 3,600; Referee: Dmytro Kryvushkin

20 September 2017	Prykarpattia Ivano-Frankivsk (2L)	2 – 1 (Note: At the 65th minute of the game Karpaty fans became violent and referee was forced to suspend a game for about 30 minutes. More fans violence took place after the game which led to detention of several dozens of football hooligans.)	(PL) Karpaty Lviv	Ivano-Frankivsk
18:00	Boryshkevych 41'; Derbakh 65'	Report	Memeshev 90+3'	Stadium: Rukh; Attendance: 9,860; Referee: Oleksandr Solovyan

20 September 2017	SCC Demnya (AM)	1–2	(2L) FC Lviv	Lviv
19:00	Boryk 44'	Report	Kyslenko 40'; Omelchenko 90+2'	Stadium: SKIF; Attendance: 2,100; Referee: Vadym Zaprutnyak

20 September 2017	SC Dnipro-1 (2L)	1–0	(1L) Hirnyk-Sport Horishni Plavni	Dnipro
19:00	Sula 20'	Report		Stadium: Dnipro Arena; Attendance: 3,000; Referee: Oleksandr Afanasyev

=== Round of 16 (1/8) ===
In this round the final 6 representatives from the Premier League will enter the competition along with the 10 teams that advanced from the previous round including 4 teams from the Premier League, 2 teams from the First League and 4 teams from the Second League. The draw was without seeds and was held on 27 September 2017. The round matches were played on 25 October 2017.

25 October 2017	Arsenal Kyiv (1L)	0–1	(PL) Veres Rivne	Shchaslyve, Kyiv Oblast
13:00		Report	Morozenko 19'	Stadium: Arsenal-Arena; Attendance: 600; Referee: Yuriy Hrysyo (Lviv)

25 October 2017	Tavriya Simferopol (2L)	0–5	(PL) FC Mariupol	Beryslav, Kherson Oblast
14:00		Report	Boryachuk 36', 90'; Tankovskyi 53'; Korobenko 73', 83'	Stadium: Mashynobudivnyk; Attendance: 1,200; Referee: Maksym Kozyryatskyi (Zaporizhia)

25 October 2017	Vorskla Poltava (PL)	2–0 (a.e.t.)	(PL) Olimpik Donetsk	Poltava
17:00	Sharpar 104'; Kulach 109'	Report		Stadium: Vorskla; Attendance: 758; Referee: Oleksandr Derdo (Odesa)

25 October 2017	Prykarpattia Ivano-Frankivsk (2L)	0–2	(1L) Desna Chernihiv	Ivano-Frankivsk
18:00		Report	Oliynyk 16'; Volkov 24'	Stadium: Rukh; Attendance: 6,650; Referee: Volodymyr Milanych (Mykolaiv)

25 October 2017	SC Dnipro-1 (2L)	0–0 (a.e.t.) (8–7 p)	(PL) Chornomorets Odesa	Dnipro
19:00		Report		Stadium: Dnipro Arena; Attendance: 2,520; Referee: Oleksandr Shandor (Lviv)
	Penalties
	Kravchenko (penalty scored); Lohinov (penalty missed); Lyashenko (penalty scored); Supriaha (penalty scored); Lopyryonok (penalty scored); Voitsekhovskyi (penalty scored); Brovchenko (penalty scored); Polyovyi (penalty scored); Poplavka (penalty scored)		Vasin (penalty scored); Khoblenko (penalty scored); Martynenko (penalty missed); Politylo (penalty scored); Tatarkov (penalty scored); Žunić (penalty scored); Zubeiko (penalty scored); Musolitin (penalty scored); Lyulka (penalty missed)

25 October 2017	FC Lviv (2L)	1–1 (a.e.t.) (5–3 p)	(PL) Stal Kamianske	Lviv
19:00	Kyslenko 69'	Report	Klymchuk 11'	Stadium: SKIF; Attendance: 2,500; Referee: Volodymyr Novokhatniy (Kyiv)
	Penalties
	Bukhal (penalty scored); Orlovskyi (penalty scored); Zaichuk (penalty scored); Koblyuk (penalty scored); Oshchypko (penalty scored)		Mytsyk (penalty scored); Mykhailychenko (penalty missed); Obradović (penalty scored); Yakymiv (penalty scored)

25 October 2017	Zorya Luhansk (PL)	3–4 (a.e.t.)	(PL) Shakhtar Donetsk	Zaporizhia
19:00	Lunyov 12'; Hordiyenko 51'; Kharatin 106'	Report	Ferreyra 72', 90'; Kovalenko 99'; Blanco Leschuk 117'	Stadium: Slavutych-Arena; Attendance: 5,511; Referee: Anatoliy Abdula (Kharkiv)

25 October 2017	FC Oleksandriya (PL)	2–3 (a.e.t.)	(PL) Dynamo Kyiv	Oleksandriia, Kirovohrad Oblast
19:30	Starenkyi 77'; Hrytsuk 120' (pen.)	Report	Kravets 36', 116'; Besyedin 107'	Stadium: Nika; Attendance: 1,802; Referee: Yuriy Mozharovskyi (Lviv)

=== Quarterfinals (1/4) ===
In this round advanced 5 representatives from the Premier League, a team from the First League and 2 teams from the Second League. The draw was without seeds and was held on 31 October 2017 in the House of Football, Kyiv. The round matches were played on 29 November 2017.

29 November 2017	Vorskla Poltava (PL)	1–2	(PL) FC Mariupol	Poltava
17:00	Kulach 13'	Report	Boryachuk 24'; Totovytskyi 77'	Stadium: Vorskla; Attendance: 600; Referee: Anatoliy Abdula

29 November 2017	Desna Chernihiv (1L)	0–2	(PL) Dynamo Kyiv	Chernihiv
19:00		Report	Harmash 6'; Rusyn 90+3'	Stadium: imeni Yuriya Gagarina; Attendance: 11,467; Referee: Yuriy Mozharovskyi

29 November 2017	FC Lviv (2L)	1–2 (a.e.t.)	(2L) SC Dnipro-1	Lviv
19:00	Kyslenko 23'	Report	Snizhko 75'; Poplavka 119'	Stadium: SKIF; Attendance: 2,790; Referee: Mykola Kryvonosov

29 November 2017	Shakhtar Donetsk (PL)	4–0	(PL) Veres Rivne	Kharkiv
19:30	Ferreyra 7'; Bernard 45'; Marlos 63'; Leschuk 83'	Report		Stadium: Metalist; Attendance: 1,350; Referee: Vitaliy Romanov

=== Semifinals (1/2) ===
In this round advanced 3 representatives from the Premier League and a team from the Second League. The draw was without seeds and was held on 2 March 2018. SC Dnipro-1 will play its semifinal game at home as being from the lowest league. The round matches are scheduled to be played on 18 April 2018.

18 April 2018	SC Dnipro-1 (2L)	1–4	(PL) Dynamo Kyiv	Dnipro
19:00	Kravchenko 58'	Report	Tsyhankov 28' (pen.); Shepelyev 38'; Besyedin 44'; Verbič 66'	Stadium: Dnipro Arena; Attendance: 12,214; Referee: Yaroslav Kozyk (Mukacheve)

18 April 2018	Shakhtar Donetsk (PL)	5–1	(PL) FC Mariupol	Kharkiv
19:00	Taison 8', 45+2'; Marlos 38'; Kayode 74'; Petryak 81'	Report	Tyschenko 22'	Stadium: Metalist; Attendance: 2,671; Referee: Yevhen Aranovskyi (Kyiv)

=== Final ===
9 May 2018	Dynamo Kyiv	0–2	Shakhtar Donetsk	Dnipro Arena, Dnipro
		Report	Ferreyra 48'; Rakytskyi 61'	Attendance: 28,155; Referee: Yuriy Mozharovskyi

== Top goalscorers ==
The competition's top ten goalscorers including qualification rounds.
As of 9 May 2018

Rank	Scorer	Team	Goals (Pen.)
1	(Ukraine) Serhiy Kyslenko	FC Lviv	5
2	(Argentina) Facundo Ferreyra	Shakhtar Donetsk	4
3	(Ukraine) Andriy Boryachuk	FC Mariupol	3
3	(Ukraine) Andriy Shevchuk (Note: in 2016 Shevchuk played in Crimea)	Hirnyk-Sport Horishni Plavni	3
5	14 players		2
19	99 players		1

Notes:

- there were 2 own goals scored during the first round, 2 own goals during the second round, one in the third round.

== See also ==
- 2017–18 Ukrainian Premier League
- 2017–18 Ukrainian First League
- 2017–18 Ukrainian Second League
- 2017–18 UEFA Europa League
- 2017–18 Ukrainian Amateur Cup
