= Kolos Stadium =

Kolos Stadium may refer to any of several stadiums in Ukraine:

- Kolos Stadium (Bershad), hosted a match in 2004–05 Ukrainian Cup in Bershad, Vinnytsia Oblast
- Kolos Stadium (Borispil), in Boryspil, Kyiv Oblast
- Kolos Stadium (Chkalove), hosted 2006 finals of Ukrainian Amateur Cup in Chkalove, Dnipropetrovsk Oblast
- Kolos Stadium (Khlibodarivka), hosted a round of 2016–17 Ukrainian Amateur Cup in Khlibodarivka, Kherson Oblast
- Kolos Stadium (Kovalivka), home of FC Kolos Kovalivka in Kovalivka, Kyiv Oblast
- Kolos Stadium (Luzhany), hosted 2000 finals of Ukrainian Amateur Cup in Luzhany, Chernivtsi Oblast
- Kolos Stadium (Lypovets), hosted a round of 2016–17 Ukrainian Amateur Cup in Lypovets, Vinnytsia Oblast
- Kolos Stadium (Mashivka), hosted 2012 finals of Ukrainian Amateur Cup in Mashivka, Poltava Oblast
- Kolos Stadium (Parkhomivka), hosted 1996–97 finals of Ukrainian Amateur Cup in Parkhomivka, Kharkiv Oblast
- Kolos Stadium (Sumy), former stadium for FC Spartak Sumy in Sumy, Sumy Oblast
