= Momot =

Momot (Russian: Момот, Ukrainian: Момот) is a gender-neutral Slavic surname that may refer to

- Anatoliy Momot (born 1958), Ukrainian football coach
- Vitaliy Momot (born 1990), Ukrainian football defender
- Peter Momot (born 1977), SEPTA electrician
