= Mohamed Dhou =

Libyan footballer (born 1994)

Personal information
- Full name: Mohamed Sadeg Dhou
- Date of birth: 20 June 1994 (age 32)
- Place of birth: Libya
- Position: Midfielder

Team information
- Current team: Chaika
- Number: 6

Senior career*
Years	Team	Apps	(Gls)
–2017	Lokomotyv Kyiv		
2017–	Chaika	39	(0)
- * Club domestic league appearances and goals as of 10 July 2021

Mohamed Sadeg Dhou (Arabic: محمد صادق ذو; born 20 June 1994) is a Libyan professional footballer who plays as a midfielder for Ukrainian club Chaika.

== Personal life ==
Born in Libya, Dhou and his family moved to Ukraine for work. He studied in an Arab school, and played football in the playground with his classmates. In the meantime, his parents returned to Libya, and Dhou remained to study at the institute.

== Career ==
Dhou began playing football for amateur club Lokomotyv Kyiv; noticed at a winter tournament by Chaika, Dhou initially refused to take part in a try-out. The two teams met each other once again: this time Dhou agreed to a try-out, and joined the Chaika.

In 2016–17 Dhou played five games in the Ukrainian Amateur League, and won the Ukrainian Amateur Cup. The following season, he helped his team gain promotion to the Ukrainian Second League, making his debut in the 2018–19 season on 22 July 2018, in a 3–0 away win against Bukovyna.

== Honours ==
Chaika

- Ukrainian Amateur Cup: 2016–17
