= Serhiy Kyslenko =

Ukrainian footballer

Personal information
- Full name: Serhiy Vitaliyovych Kyslenko
- Date of birth: 30 June 1998 (age 28)
- Place of birth: Taranivka, Kharkiv Oblast, Ukraine
- Height: 1.88 m (6 ft 2 in)
- Position: Forward

Team information
- Current team: Feniks-Mariupol
- Number: 9

Youth career
- 2014–2015: Kharkiv sports school 9
- 2016–2017: UFC Olimpik Kharkiv

Senior career*
Years	Team	Apps	(Gls)
2016	Helios-Akademiya Kharkiv (amateurs)	7	(6)
2017–2018	Lviv	28	(9)
2019	Kalush	10	(2)
2019–2022	Nyva Ternopil	62	(24)
2022–2023	Polissya Zhytomyr	9	(1)
2023–2024	Zviahel	12	(2)
2024–2026	Inhulets Petrove	38	(7)
2026–	Feniks-Mariupol	11	(4)
- * Club domestic league appearances and goals as of 4 June 2026

Serhiy Vitaliyovych Kyslenko (Ukrainian: Сергій Віталійович Кисленко; born 30 June 1998) is a Ukrainian professional football forward who plays for Feniks-Mariupol in the Ukrainian First League.

== Career ==
Kyslenko is a product of several Kharkiv city sports schools including FC Helios Kharkiv, FC Olimpik Kharkiv, others. His first coach was Mykola Pilghui. He was noticed by the FC Lviv head coach at the 2016-17 Ukrainian First League under-19 final tournament that took place in Zakarpattia Oblast when Kyslenko played for UFC Olimpik Kharkiv and was among the tournament's top scorers.

In 2016 Kyslenko started to play for the FC Helios Kharkiv reserves in the regional competitions of Kharkiv Oblast, later joined FC Olimpik Kharkiv that fielded its team in youth competitions conducted jointly with the Professional Football League of Ukraine.

He made his professional debut for FC Lviv in the match against FC Bukovyna Chernivtsi on 15 July 2017 in the Ukrainian Second League scoring a hat-trick in 4-3 win. In 2017 Kyslenko became one of the competition's leading scorers of the 2017-18 Ukrainian Cup.
