= Holy Presentation Church =

- Church of the Presentation of the Blessed Virgin Mary
- Свято-Введенська церква
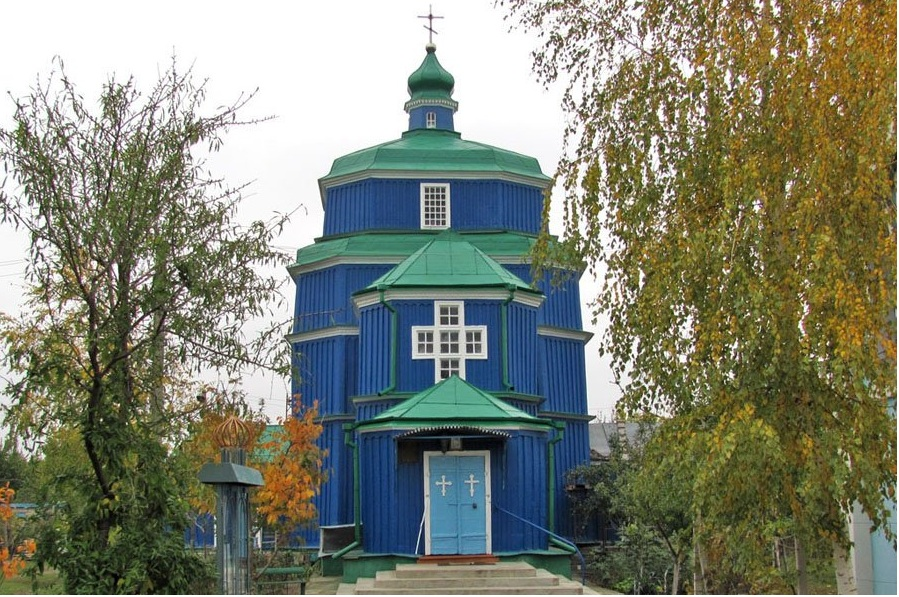
- Front view of Holy Presentation Church

- Location within Ukraine
- 46°50′55.5″N 33°26′27.2″E
- Location: Beryslav
- Country: Ukraine
- Denomination: UOC

History
- Status: Destroyed

Architecture
- Years built: 1726
- Demolished: 2026

Specifications
- Height: 17 m (56 ft)

Administration
- Diocese: Ukrainian Orthodox Church

Holy Presentation Church (Ukrainian: Свято-Введенська церква; Russian: Свято-Введенская церковь) was an Orthodox church in Beryslav, Ukraine. Its original name was the Resurrection Church. It is an 18th-century building constructed in 1725 of oak with an iron roof. In 1784, the church was transported by the Cossacks along the Dnipro River from the Zaporizhian Perevolochna fortress to Beryslav. From 1939 to 1941, the church was closed. It belonged to the Ukrainian Orthodox Church (Moscow Patriarchate) community. In 2026, the building burned down following a Russian drone strike.

== History ==
In 1726, the church was built as a military church in the Cossack fortress Perevolochna in Poltava Governorate (now Dnipropetrovsk Oblast), on the border of Zaporozhian Sich. It was located 350 kilometers from where it currently stands.

At the beginning of the 15th century, these lands (now Beryslav Raion) were the southern borders of the Grand Duchy of Lithuania. There was a custom known as Vitovtova. There was a Dnipro River ferry, Tavanskyi pereviz, which got its name from the Tavan Island. In the 16th century, these lands were captured by the Crimean Khanate, and instead of the customs the Kyzykermen fortress (Turkish: 'Maiden castle') was built, which became an obstacle for the Zaporizhian Cossacks' light ships (called chaika) in the lower reach of the Dnipro River and the Black Sea. In 1689, during the Crimean campaign, the Russian Army under the command of knyaz N. Golitsyn unsuccessfully tried to capture the fortress. Only in 1695, after a long siege by Russian troops, together with Zaporizhian Cossacks, was Kyzykermen captured and these lands passed to the Russian Empire.

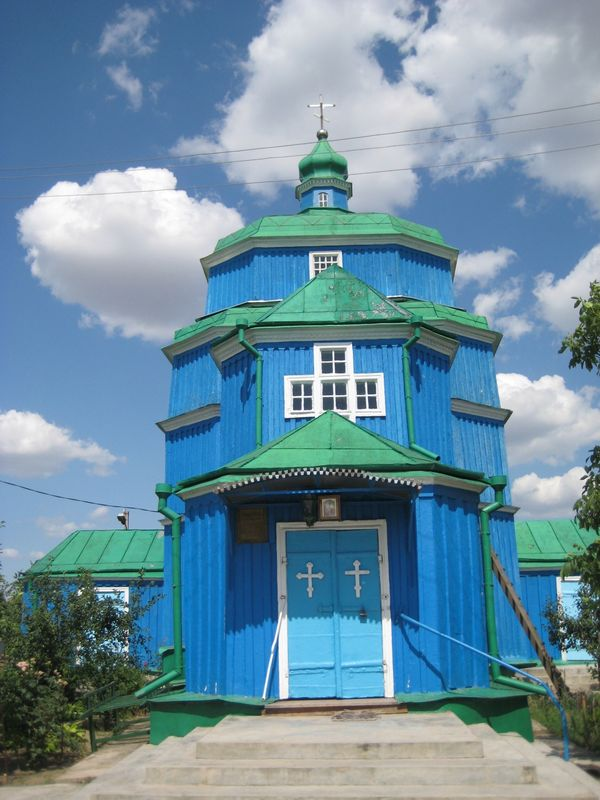
Front view

In 1784, the Cossacks rafted the church over the Dnipro River to Kyzykermen, which in the same year received the status of a city and was named Beryslav. According to legend, on the raft on which the Church was transported, there was an inscription: "take and glorify" (bery i slav). The name of the city comes from that phrase.

"At that time Empress Catherine II decreed the settlement of the South of Ukraine, and people from Poltava took with them this shrine - said priest Alexander. - There are two versions of its delivering. According to the first, the whole Church was rafted along the Dnipro River, but in that case only chips would have remained. Therefore, the second version is more reliable, according to which the Church was first taken apart, then all parts were numbered, rafted, and then they were reassembled without a single nail on a new place..."

There is a legend among the citizens of Beryslav that the Holy Presentation Church was washed away by spring flooding and sailed down the river straight to the city.

As a result, in a rare case in the history of Ukrainian architecture, the oldest building in the city is older than Beryslav itself by more than half a century.

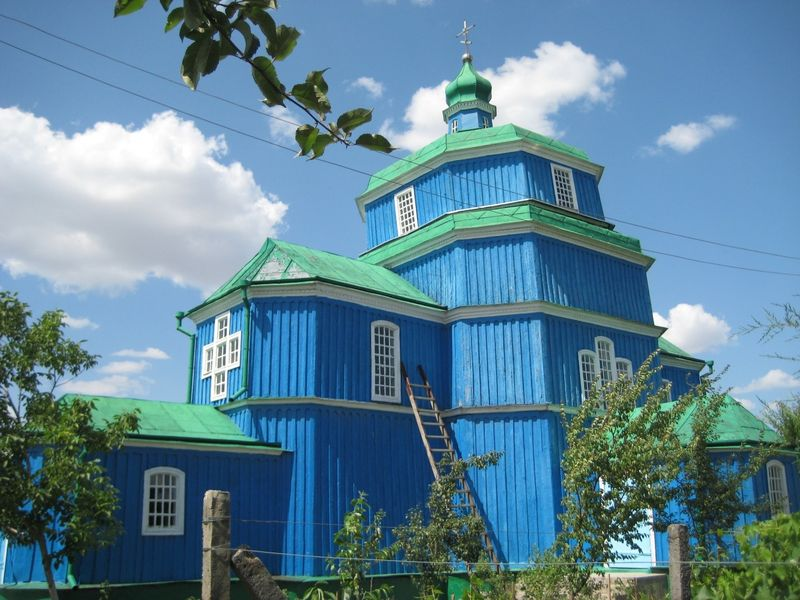
Back view

After delivery, the church was put in the historic center of the city, on the place of the current People's Hall (House of Culture), and consecrated in honor of the Resurrection of Christ (Easter). In 1853, in the midst of the Crimean War, for an unknown reason, the church was moved outside of Beryslav, to the place where the Presentation cemetery was founded. The church itself was re-consecrated in honor of the Presentation of the Blessed Virgin Mary. At the former place a majestic church was built, which was later demolished by the Soviet regime.

In the first half of the 20th century the Holy Presentation Church was closed, like all other Orthodox shrines. Right before the beginning of the Second World War, there was even a proposal to disassemble it for firewood and burn it: trees were very rare in the steppe areas.

Now Holy Presentation Church is a protected architectural monument from the 18th century.

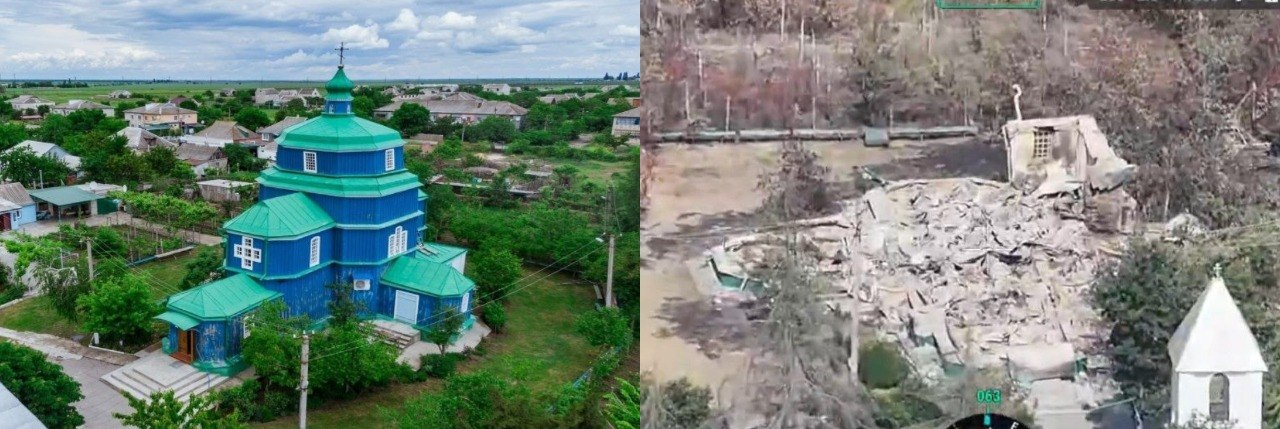
Before and after the strike

On August 2, 2026, the church burned down as a result of a strike by a Russian drone.

== Architecture ==
The church was built in a style typical for folk architecture. It was one of the few extant examples of Zaporizhian Cossack wooden architecture.

The church belonged to the cross-domed type, had a longitudinal-axial composition; with the main volume being octagonal and the apse pentagonal. To the main volume from the north, south and west were attached faceted porches.

The church was single-domed, crowned with an unusual – similar to Tatar – polygonal spherical dome with a small onion dome. The church was painted in bright blue with green accents. The material used came from oak logs, which were vertically covered with boards, set on a stone foundation, and covered with iron.

The central window above the main entrance had a cross-like shape. Concrete steps led to the main door. The entire height of the church was 17 meters.

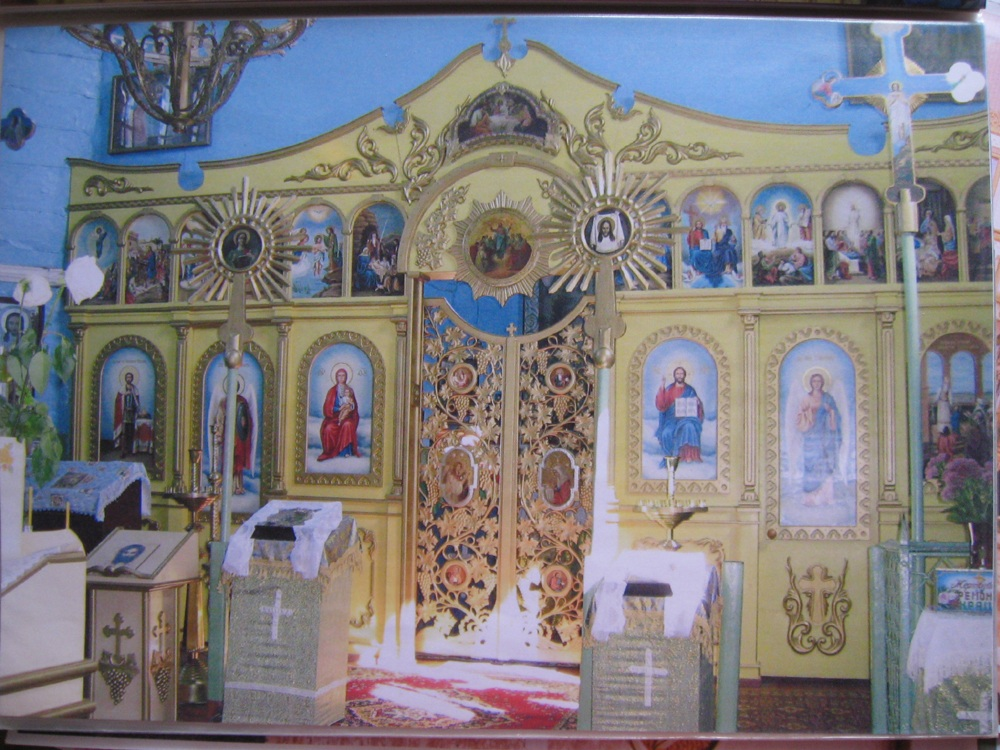
Interior
