= Oleksandr Snizhko =

Ukrainian footballer

Personal information
- Full name: Oleksandr Vadymovych Snizhko
- Date of birth: 20 August 1996 (age 30)
- Place of birth: Zaporizhzhia, Ukraine
- Height: 1.73 m (5 ft 8 in)
- Position: Midfielder

Team information
- Current team: Podillya Khmelnytskyi
- Number: 77

Youth career
- 2007–2011: Kryvbas Kryvyi Rih
- 2011–2013: Dnipro Dnipropetrovsk

Senior career*
Years	Team	Apps	(Gls)
2013–2015	Dnipro Dnipropetrovsk	0	(0)
2015–2016	Hirnyk Kryvyi Rih	0	(0)
2016	→ Hirnyk-2 Kryvbas Kryvyi Rih	3	(0)
2016–2017	Bukovyna Chernivtsi	24	(1)
2017–2020	Dnipro-1	68	(3)
2020–2021	Mynai	22	(0)
2021	LNZ Cherkasy	5	(1)
2022	Alians Lypova Dolyna	0	(0)
2022	AB Argir	2	(0)
2022–2023	Metalurh Zaporizhzhia	26	(0)
2024–	Podillya Khmelnytskyi	55	(3)
- * Club domestic league appearances and goals as of 4 June 2026

Oleksandr Vadymovych Snizhko (Ukrainian: Олександр Вадимович Сніжко; born 20 August 1996) is a Ukrainian professional footballer who plays for Podillya Khmelnytskyi.

== Career ==
Snizhko is a product of the Kryvbas and Dnipro Youth Sport Schools.

After playing for Ukrainian clubs in the different levels, in July 2017 he signed a contract with a new created SC Dnipro-1 from the Ukrainian Second League.
