= Beryslav =

City in Kherson Oblast, Ukraine

Beryslav Берислав
- City
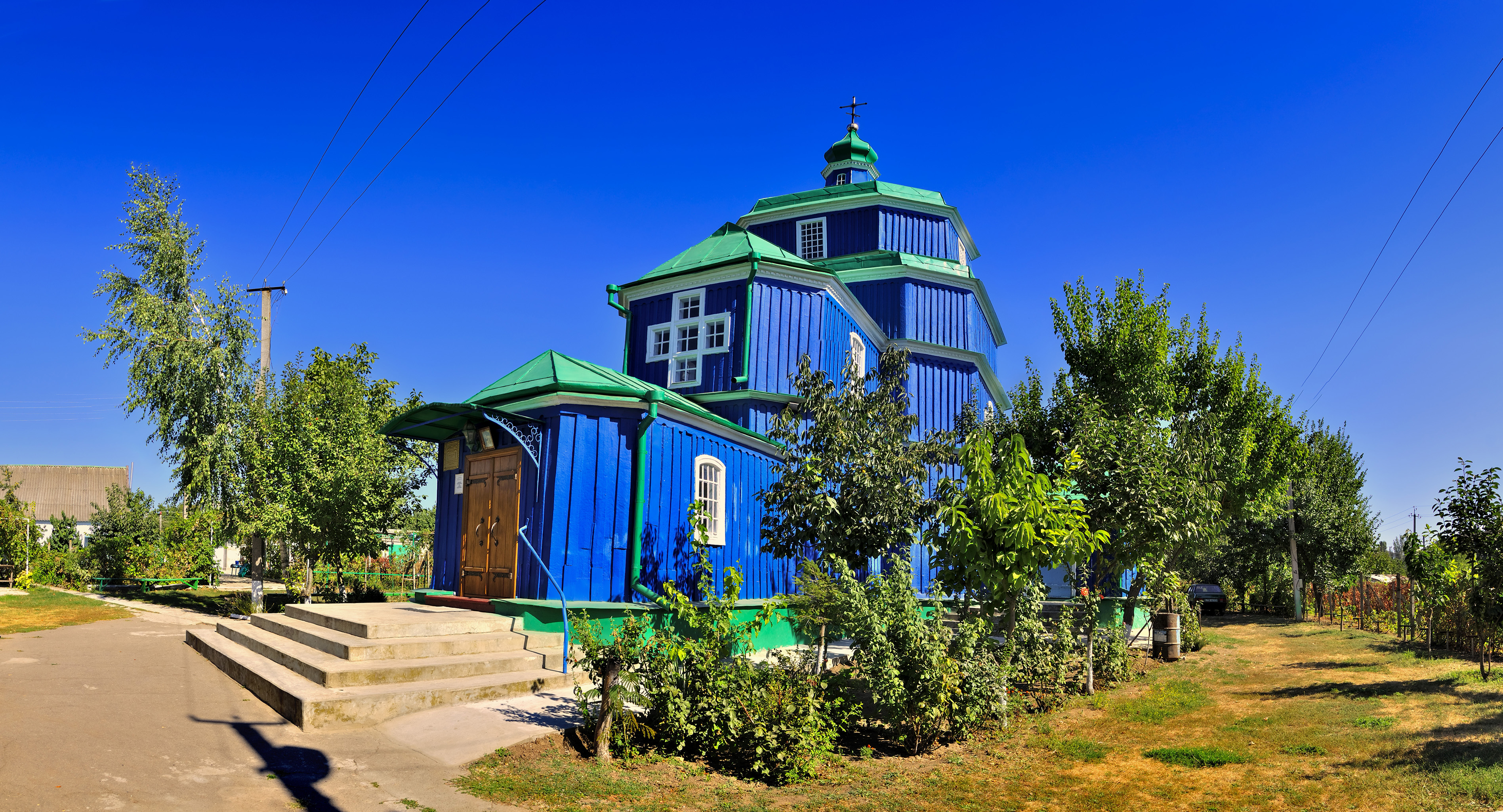
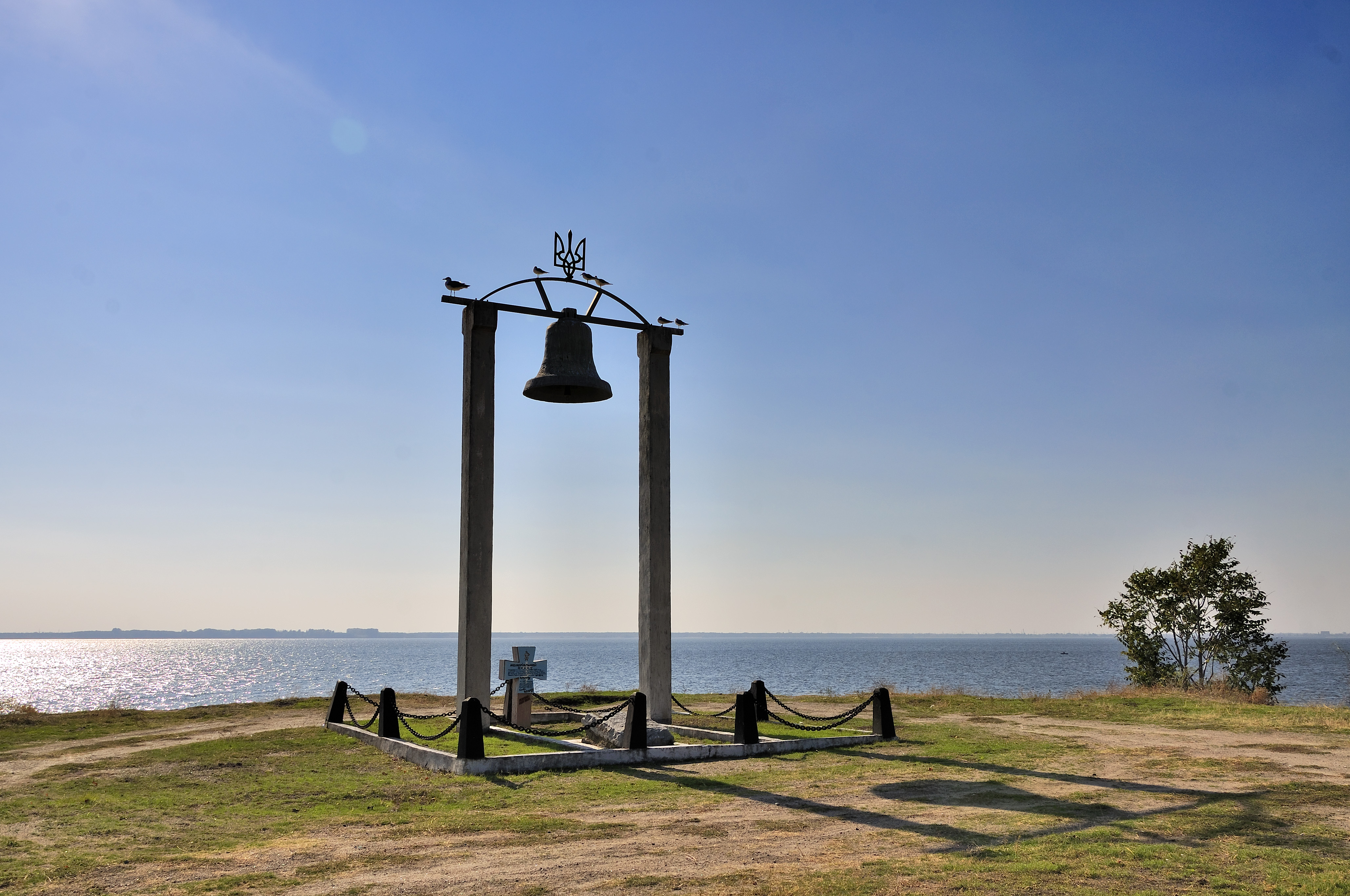
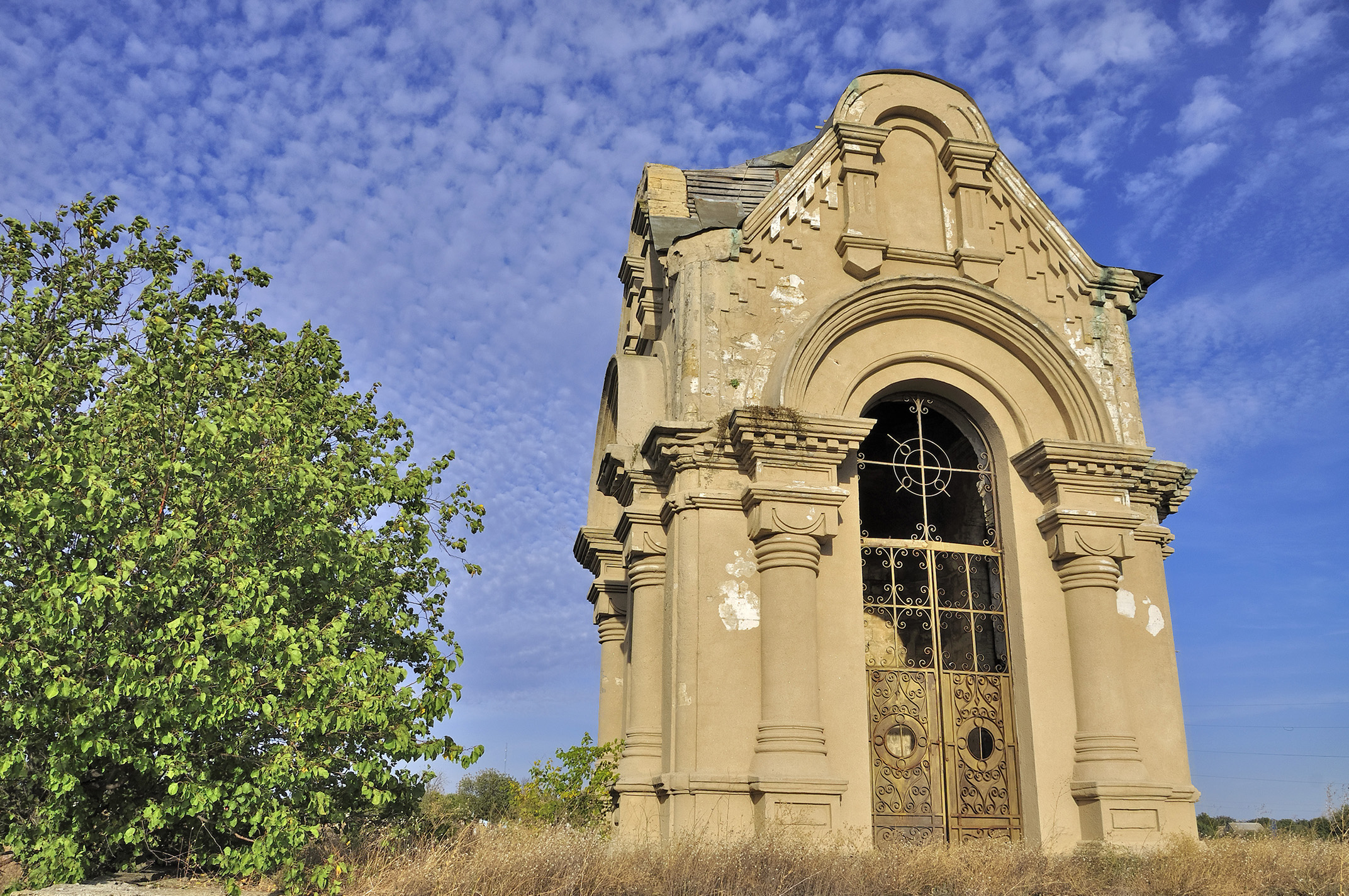
- Holy Presentation Church before its destruction in 2026 Beryslav Cossack memorial Cemetery chapel

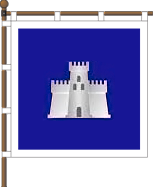
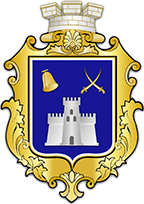
- Flag Coat of arms
- Interactive map of Beryslav
- Location within Kherson Oblast Location within Ukraine
- Coordinates: 46°50′N 33°25′E
- Country: Ukraine
- Oblast: Kherson Oblast
- Raion: Beryslav Raion
- Hromada: Beryslav urban hromada

Population (2022)
  - Total: ▼11,895
- Climate: Dfa

Beryslav (Ukrainian: Берислав, IPA: [berɪˈsɫɑu̯]) is a city in Kherson Oblast, southern Ukraine. It serves as the administrative center of Beryslav Raion, housing the district's local administration buildings. Beryslav hosts the administration of Beryslav urban hromada, one of the hromadas of Ukraine. Population: 11,895 (2022 estimate).

The city is located on the right-bank of the Dnieper River across from Kakhovka on the opposite bank. Until the creation of the Kakhovka Reservoir, the city contained one of a historical crossing over the Dnieper.

By the Resolution of the Cabinet of Ministers of Ukraine of July 26, 2001, No. 878, Beryslav was included in the List of Historical Populated Places of Ukraine as the oldest settlement in Kherson Oblast.

== History ==
=== Early history ===
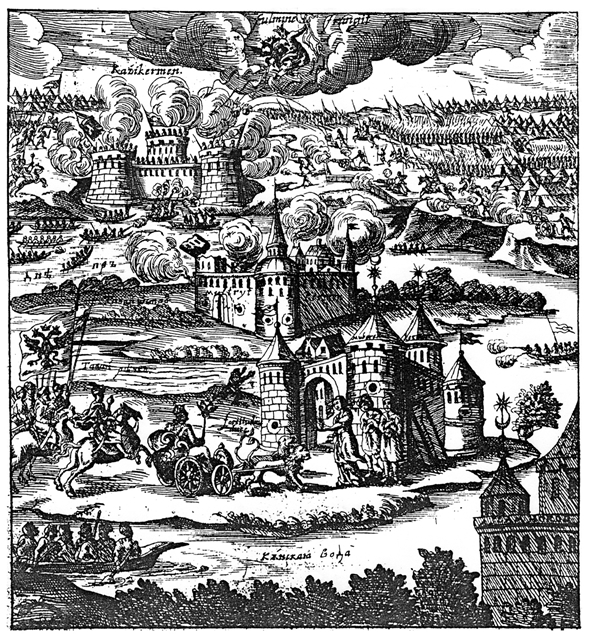
Siege of Kazikermen in 1695 by united forces of Ivan Mazepa and Boris Sheremetev, engraving by Tarasiewicz

One of the oldest settlements in the Kherson Oblast, in the late 14th century Beryslav was part of the Grand Duchy of Lithuania. It served as a Lithuanian customs point on the trade route between Caffa and Kyiv, as the lower Dnieper formed the Lithuanian border. It later served as a Polish and Cossack fortress.

Later on it was known as the Turkish fortress of Kizikermen or Kazikermen (Gazikermen). Kazikermen and Islamkermen and Sahinkermen nearby were primary fortifications in the lower Dnieper area starting in the 15th century. According to legend, chains were stretched across the Dnieper between the fortifications to control river traffic. Here was also one of the fords providing access across the Dnieper known as Tawan crossing. At the end of August of 1695, Kazikermen was sacked by the Zaporizhia Host Cossacks of Ivan Mazepa and the Sloboda Ukraine Cossacks of Boris Sheremetev during the so called Azov-Dnieper campaigns.

By the 1700 Treaty of Constantinople, the Ottomans disbanded the fortifications. Later in the 19th century, ruins of the Kazikermen fortress were completely cleared away. After its 1784 re-establishment, the settlement was renamed Beryslav.

=== 20th century ===
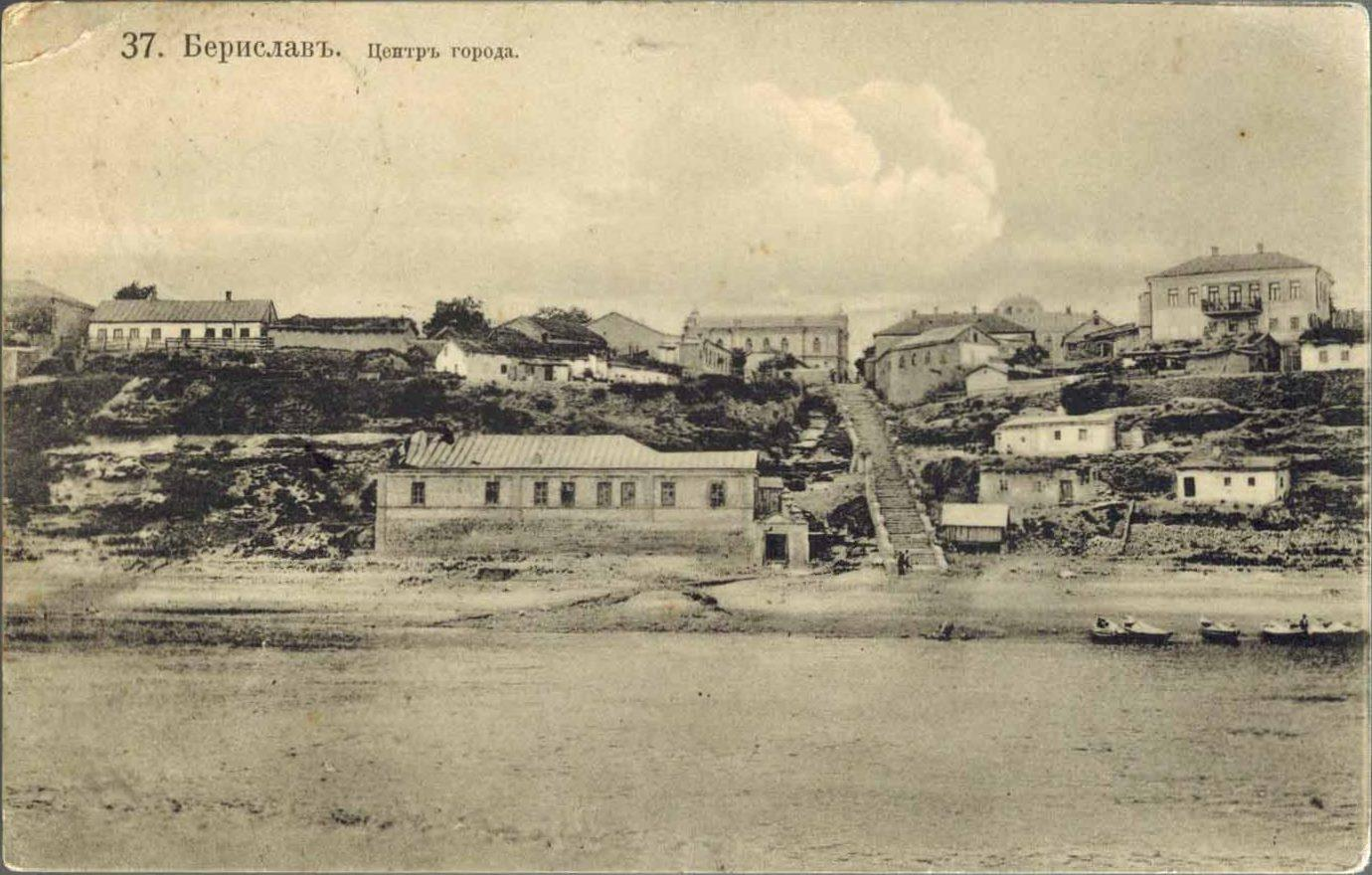
Early-20th-century view

On 16 December 1918, Hetman of Ukraine Pavlo Skoropadsky signed a telegram in Beryslav addressed to Kyiv where he officially resigned from his post.

During World War II, Beryslav was occupied by German forces on August 23, 1941. On September 22 about 400 Jews then living in Beryslav were murdered near the town by the members of Einsatzgruppe D. Another 35 Jews from Beryslav were shot in early October 1941. In September 1941, the Germans relocated the Dulag 123 transit prisoner-of-war camp from Varvarivka to Beryslav, and in November 1941, it was further relocated to Dzhankoi. Beryslav was recaptured by the Red Army on March 11, 1944.

=== Recent events ===
Since August 2016, the city has hosted the revived Ukrainian Premier League and UEFA Europa League football club, Tavriya Simferopol.

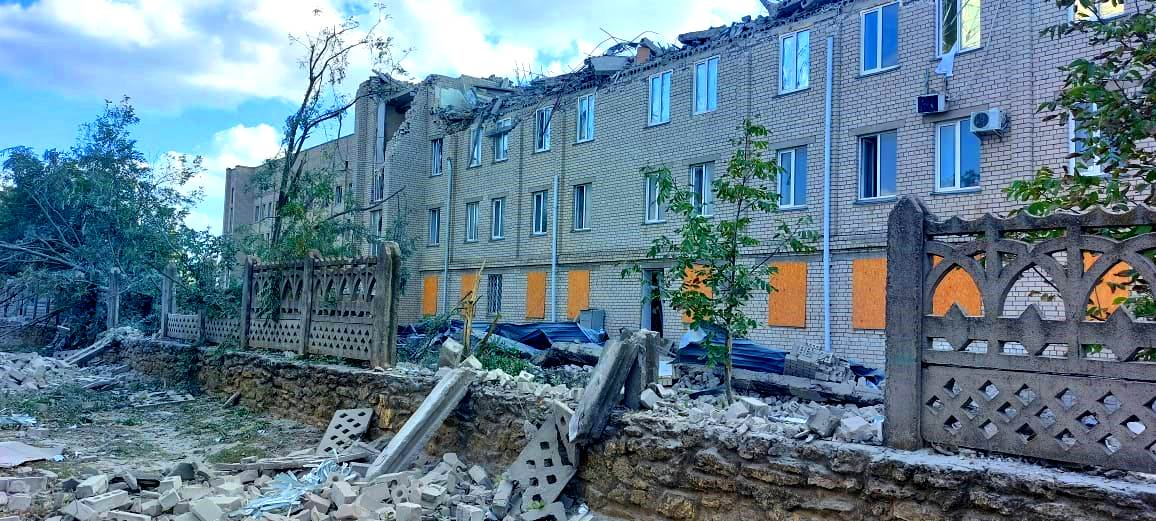
Hospital in Beryslav after Russian shelling, 2023

During the Russian invasion of Ukraine in 2022, Beryslav was one of many settlements occupied by the Russians, but was recaptured by the Ukrainian military during the southern counteroffensive on 11 November.

== Demographics ==
Ethnic makeup of the town according to the 2001 Ukrainian census:

Ethnic groups in Beryslav
| | percent |
| Ukrainians | 89.43% |
| Russians | 8.71% |
| Roma | 0.53% |
| Belarusians | 0.39% |
| Armenians | 0.20% |
| Moldovans | 0.19% |

Native language according to the 2001 Ukrainian census:

Languages in Beryslav
| Languages | percent |
| Ukrainian | 89.5% |
| Russian | 10.1% |
| Armenian | 0.1% |
| Belarusian | 0.1% |
| others | 0.2% |

== Sights ==
- Holy Presentation Church, a wooden church from the 18th century; burned down in August 2026 following a Russian drone strike.

== See also ==
- List of cities in Ukraine
