= Maksym Borovets =

Ukrainian footballer (born 1992)

Personal information
- Full name: Maksym Fedorovych Borovets
- Date of birth: 15 April 1992 (age 34)
- Place of birth: Khrystynivka, Ukraine
- Height: 1.75 m (5 ft 9 in)
- Position: Midfielder

Team information
- Current team: Kudrivka

Youth career
- 2005–2006: RVUFK Kyiv
- 2006–2009: Dynamo Kyiv

Senior career*
Years	Team	Apps	(Gls)
2009–2011	Dynamo Kyiv	0	(0)
2010–2011	→ Dynamo-2 Kyiv	10	(0)
2012	Tavriya Simferopol	0	(0)
2012–2013	Metalist Kharkiv	0	(0)
2013	→ Bukovyna Chernivtsi (loan)	8	(0)
2013–2014	Enosis Neon Paralimni	5	(0)
2014–2015	Poltava	31	(1)
2015–2017	Kolos Kovalivka	22	(3)
2017–2018	Arsenal Kyiv	19	(0)
2018	Veres Rivne	15	(0)
2019–2020	Polissya Zhytomyr	29	(2)
2020–2021	Bukovyna Chernivtsi	23	(0)
2021–	Kudrivka	10	(0)

International career
2007–2008	Ukraine-16	10	(1)
2010	Ukraine-18	2	(0)
- * Club domestic league appearances and goals as of 10 July 2021

Maksym Borovets (Ukrainian: Максим Федорович Боровець; born 15 April 1992) is a professional Ukrainian football midfielder.

Ilchysh is the product of the Sportive School of Dynamo Kyiv. He spent some years for playing in the different the Ukrainian First League clubs.

He signed deal with the Cypriot football club Enosis Neon Paralimni FC in July 2013, but in March of the next year returned in Ukraine.

== Honours ==
Kudrivka

- Chernihiv Oblast Football Cup 2021
- Kyiv Oblast Football Cup: 2021
