= Oleksandr Medvedyev =

Ukrainian footballer

Personal information
- Full name: Oleksandr Valeriyovych Medvedyev
- Date of birth: 7 July 1994 (age 32)
- Place of birth: Kramatorsk, Ukraine
- Height: 1.83 m (6 ft 0 in)
- Position: Centre-back

Youth career
- 2009–2010: Monolit Illichivsk
- 2010–2011: Illichivets Mariupol

Senior career*
Years	Team	Apps	(Gls)
2011–2012	Illichivets-2 Mariupol	9	(0)
2012–2013	Illichivets Mariupol	0	(0)
2013	Barsa Sumy	0	(0)
2014	Sumy	0	(0)
2014	Spartak-Sumbud Sumy	2	(0)
2015–2017	Sumy	54	(1)
2017–2018	Inhulets Petrove	16	(2)
2017	→ Inhulets-2 Petrove	10	(0)
2018–2021	Alians Lypova Dolyna	42	(0)
2021	Kramatorsk	7	(0)
- * Club domestic league appearances and goals as of 20 December 2021

Oleksandr Valeriyovych Medvedyev (Ukrainian: Олександр Валерійович Медведєв; born 7 July 1994) is a Ukrainian professional footballer who plays as a centre-back.
