= Oleksiy Omelchenko =

Ukrainian footballer

Personal information
- Date of birth: 20 June 1989 (age 37)
- Place of birth: Soviet Union
- Height: 1.87 m (6 ft 2 in)
- Position: Forward

Senior career*
Years	Team	Apps	(Gls)
2006–2011	Karpaty Lviv	1	(0)
2006–2008	→ Karpaty-2 Lviv	38	(5)
2011	→ Prykarpattya Ivano-Frankivsk (loan)	8	(1)
2013	Stal Dniprodzerzhynsk	10	(1)
2014	Líšeň	26	(10)
2015–2017	Rukh Vynnyky	25	(6)
2017–2018	Lviv	26	(6)
- * Club domestic league appearances and goals

Oleksiy Serhiyovych Omelchenko (born 20 June 1989) is a Ukrainian professional football striker.

== Career ==
He played for Ukrainian Premier League club FC Karpaty Lviv. He is the product of the Karpaty Lviv Youth School System.
