= Andriy Skakun =

Ukrainian footballer

Personal information
- Full name: Andriy Yuriyovych Skakun
- Date of birth: 13 September 1994 (age 32)
- Place of birth: Ternopil, Ukraine
- Height: 1.74 m (5 ft 9 in)
- Position: Left winger

Team information
- Current team: Ahron Velyki Hayi

Youth career
- 2007–2011: Ternopil

Senior career*
Years	Team	Apps	(Gls)
2012	Halych Zbarazh	0	(0)
2013–2019	Ahrobiznes Volochysk	138	(39)
2019–2021	Nyva Ternopil	46	(3)
2022–	Ahron Velyki Hayi		
- * Club domestic league appearances and goals

Andriy Yuriyovych Skakun (Ukrainian: Андрій Юрійович Скакун; born 13 September 1994) is a Ukrainian professional footballer who plays as a left winger.
