= Vitaliy Momot =

Ukrainian footballer

Personal information
- Full name: Vitaliy Anatoliyovych Momot
- Date of birth: 2 April 1990 (age 36)
- Place of birth: Ukrainian SSR
- Height: 1.86 m (6 ft 1 in)
- Position: Defender

Team information
- Current team: MFC Mykolaiv
- Number: 18

Youth career
- 2002: FC Molod Poltava
- 2003: DYSS im.I.Horpynka Poltava
- 2004–2006: FC Molod Poltava
- 2006: RVUFK Kyiv
- 2006–2007: FC Molod Poltava
- 2007–2008: Vorskla Poltava

Senior career*
| Years | Team | Apps | (Gls) |
| 2008–2010 | Vorskla Poltava | 0 | (0) |
| 2011 | Kremin Kremenchuk | 23 | (0) |
| 2012 | Poltava | 6 | (1) |
| 2012 | → Karlivka (loan) | 15 | (1) |
| 2013 | Nove Zhyttya Andriivka (amateurs) | 11 | (0) |
| 2014 | Zhemchuzhina Yalta | ? | (?) |
| 2014– | Mykolaiv | 86 | (1) |

International career^{‡}
| 2007–2008 | Ukraine-18 | 12 | (0) |
- * Club domestic league appearances and goals as of 30 November 2017 ‡ National team caps and goals as of 30 November 2017

Vitaliy Momot (Ukrainian: Віталій Анатолійович Момот; born 2 April 1990 in Ukrainian SSR) is a professional Ukrainian football defender.

After playing three seasons for the senior squad of FC Vorskla Poltava he was transferred to FC Kremin Kremenchuk in early 2011. On 30 March 2012 he joined FC Poltava.
