= 2016–17 Ukrainian Amateur Cup =

2016–17 Ukrainian Cup for amateur teams
Tournament details
- Country: Ukraine
- Teams: 26

Final positions
- Champions: SC Chaika Petropavlivska Borshchahivka
- Runners-up: SCC Demnya

The 2016-17 Ukrainian Amateur Cup was the 21st season of the national football cup competition for amateur teams, which was scheduled to start on August 31, 2016.

The cup holders FC Rochyn Sosnivka (Hirnyk) were defeated by FC ODEK Orzhiv in quarterfinals.

== Participated clubs ==
In bold are clubs that were active at the same season AAFU championship (parallel round-robin competition).

- Chernihiv Oblast (3): **Avanhard Koriukivka** , Frunzivets Nizhyn, **Yednist Plysky**
- Chernivtsi Oblast: Sloboda
- Ivano-Frankivsk Oblast: **Oskar Pidhiria**
- Kharkiv Oblast (2): Kolos Zachepylivka, **Kvadro Pervomaisky**
- Kherson Oblast: Kolos Khlibodarivka
- Khmelnytskyi Oblast: Sluch Starokostiantyniv
- Kyiv Oblast (2): **Chaika Petropavlivska Borshchahivka**, Dzhuniors Shpytky
- Kirovohrad Oblast: Nova Politsiya Kropyvnytskyi
- Lviv Oblast (5): Demnya, **Hirnyk Sosnivka**, **Lviv**, Mykolaiv, Sambir
- Mykolaiv Oblast: **Vradiyivka**
- Rivne Oblast: Mayak Sarny, **ODEK Orzhiv**
- Sumy Oblast: **Viktoriya Mykolayivka**
- Ternopil Oblast: DSO-Podillia Ternopil Raion
- Vinnytsia Oblast (3): Bershad, Fakel Lypovets, Patriot Kukavka
- Zaporizhia Oblast: **Tavria-Skif Rozdol**
- Zhytomyr Oblast: **Zhytomyr**

== Bracket ==
The following is the bracket that demonstrates the last four rounds of the Ukrainian Cup, including the final match. Numbers in parentheses next to the match score represent the results of a penalty shoot-out.

Round of 16
**Hirnyk Sosnivka**	**1**	**2**	**3**
FC Mykolaiv	0	1	1
Dzhuniors Shpytky	1	1	2
**ODEK Orzhiv**	**2**	1	**3**
**FC Lviv**	**2**	**2**	**4**
FC Sambir	0	0	0
**SCC Demnya**	**3**	**1**	**4**
Mayak Sarny	0	0	0
**Chaika Petropavlivska Borshchahivka**	2	**2**	**4**
Frunzivets Nizhyn	**3**	0	3
Tavria-Skif Rozdol	0	**1**	1 (2)
**Kolos Zachepylivka (p)**	**1**	0	**1 (4)**
**Viktoriya Mykolayivka**	**2**	**2**	**4**
Yednist Plysky	0	1	1
FC Vradiyivka	**1**	1	2
**Nova Politsiya Kropyvnytskyi**	0	**3**	**3**

Quarter-finals
**ODEK Orzhiv**	1	**2**	**3**
Rochyn Sosnivka	1	0	1
FC Lviv	1	1	2
**SCC Demnya**	**2**	1	**3**
**Chaika Petropavlivska Borshchahivka**	+
Kolos Zachepylivka	-
**Nova Politsiya Kropyvnytskyi**	**2**	**2**	**4**
Viktoriya Mykolayivka	1	1	2

Semi-finals
ODEK Orzhiv	0	1	1
**SCC Demnya**	**1**	1	**2**
**Chaika Petropavlivska Borshchahivka**	**3**	**1**	**4**
Nova Politsiya Kropyvnytskyi	0	0	0

Final
**Chaika Petropavlivska Borshchahivka**	**2**	**3**	**5**
SCC Demnya	0	1	1

== Competition schedule ==
=== Qualification round ===
Team 1	Agg.	Team 2	1st leg	2nd leg
FC Fakel Lypovets	0–2	**FC Frunzivets Nizhyn**	0–2	0–0
FC Kolos Khlibodarivka	w/o	**FC Kolos Zachepylivka**	0–5	
**FC Mykolaiv**	4–4 (a)	FC Sluch Starokostiantyniv	3–0	1–4
**FC Sambir**	2–1	FC DSO-Podillya Ternopil Raion	1–0	1–1
**FC Dzhuniors Shpytky**	3–1	FC Patriot Kukavka	2–0	1–1
FC Bershad	2–5	**FC Nova Politsiya Kropyvnytskyi**	1–1	1–4
**FC Mayak Sarny**	7–2	FSC Sloboda	5–0	2–2
**FC Viktoriya Mykolayivka**	w/o	FC Avanhard Koryukivka		
FC Kvadro Pervomaisky	2–8	**FC Tavria-Skif Rozdol**	0–2	2–6
**FC Lviv**	1–1 (a)	FC Oskar Pidhiria	0–0	1–1
**SCC Demnya**	2–1	MFC Zhytomyr	2–1	0–0

- Byes: FC Hirnyk Sosnivka, FC Yednist Plysky, FC Vradiyivka, FC ODEK Orzhiv, and FC Chaika Kyiv-Sviatoshyn Raion.

=== Round of 16 ===
Team 1	Agg.	Team 2	1st leg	2nd leg
**FC Chaika Kyiv-Sviatoshyn Raion**	4–3	FC Frunzivets Nizhyn	2–3	2–0
**FC Hirnyk Sosnivka**	3–1	FC Mykolaiv	1–0	2–1
FC Dzhuniors Shpytky	2–3	**FC ODEK Orzhiv**	1–2	1–1
**FC Lviv**	4–0	FC Sambir	2–0	2–0
**SCC Demnya**	4–0	FC Mayak Sarny	3–0	1–0
**FC Viktoriya Mykolayivka**	4–1	FC Yednist Plysky	2–0	2–1
FC Vradiyivka	2–3	**FC Nova Politsiya Kropyvnytskyi**	1–0	1–3
FC Tavria-Skif Rozdol	1–1 (2–4 p)	**FC Kolos Zachepylivka**	0–1	1–0

=== Quarterfinals ===
Team 1	Agg.	Team 2	1st leg	2nd leg
**FC Chaika Kyiv-Sviatoshyn Raion**	w/o	FC Kolos Zachepylivka		
**FC ODEK Orzhiv**	3–1	FC Rochyn Sosnivka	1–1	2–0
FC Lviv	2–3	**SCC Demnya**	1–2	1–1
**FC Nova Politsiya Kropyvnytskyi**	4–2	FC Viktoriya Mykolayivka	2–1	2–1

=== Semifinals ===
Team 1	Agg.	Team 2	1st leg	2nd leg
FC ODEK Orzhiv	1–2	**SCC Demnya**	0–1	1–1
**FC Chaika Kyiv-Sviatoshyn Raion**	4–0	FC Nova Politsiya Kropyvnytskyi	3–0	1–0

=== Final ===
Team 1	Agg.	Team 2	1st leg	2nd leg
**FC Chaika Kyiv-Sviatoshyn Raion**	5–1	SCC Demnya	2–0	3–1

Winner of the 2016–17 Ukrainian Football Cup among amateur teams
**Chaika Petropavlivska Borshchahivka (Kyiv Oblast)**; **2nd time**

== See also ==
- 2016–17 Ukrainian Football Amateur League
